= Houston Rockets draft history =

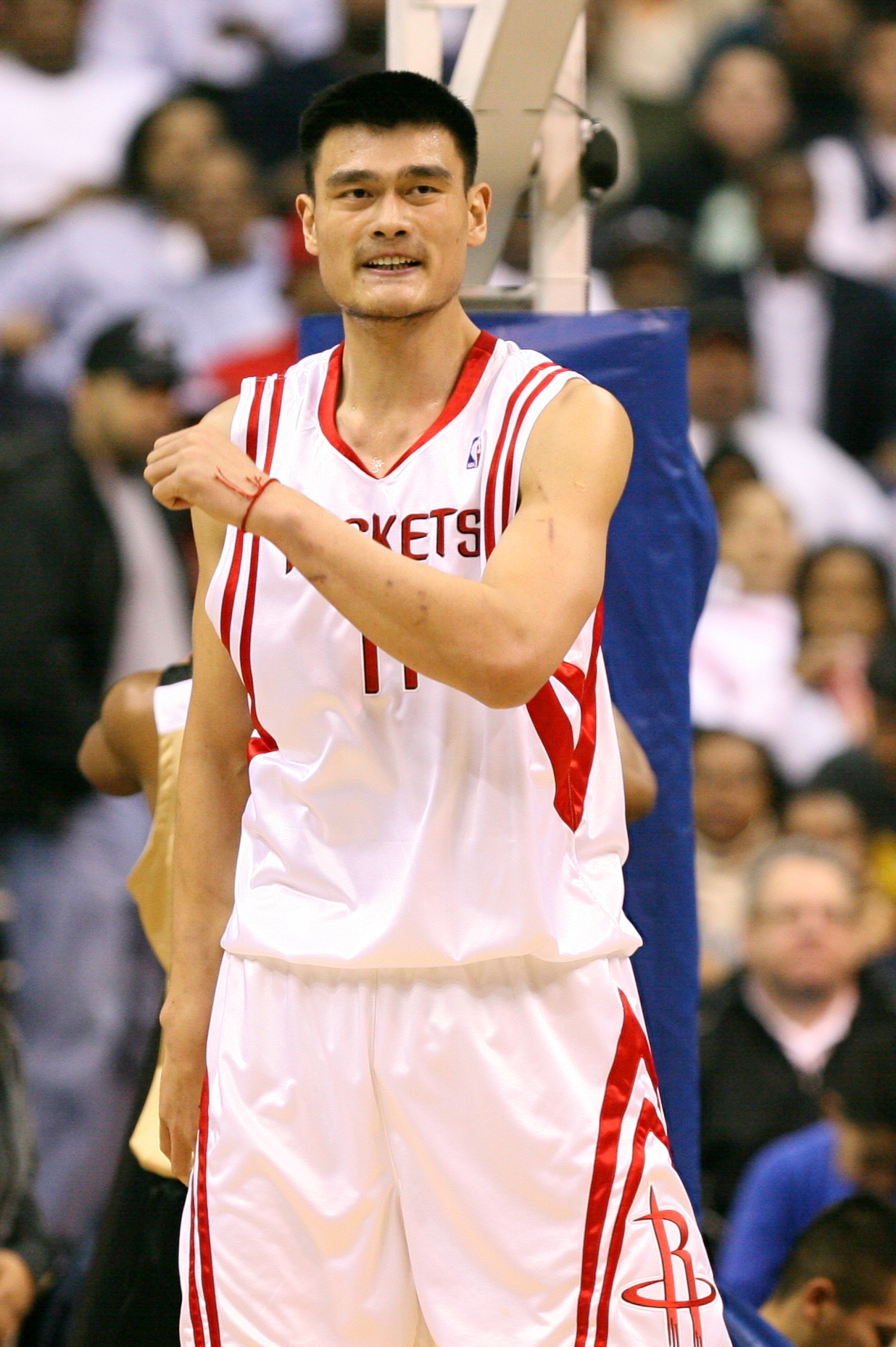
Six-time NBA All-Star Yao Ming was drafted by the Rockets in 2002 with the first overall pick of the draft.

The Houston Rockets joined the NBA in 1967 as the San Diego Rockets, and moved to Houston in 1971, where they have been located ever since.

In the first four drafts the Rockets participated in, each team had a total of 90 draft choices (14 in 1967, and 19 each from 1968 to 1971). For two drafts in 1972 and 1973, there were eight rounds, from 1974 to 1976 and 1978 to 1984, the draft was 10 rounds long. However, in 1985, the draft was shortened to seven rounds, and in 1989, the NBA agreed with the National Basketball Players' Association to limit drafts to two rounds, an arrangement that has remained the same up the present time. Before each draft, an NBA draft lottery determines the first round selection order for the teams that missed the playoffs during the prior season. Teams can also trade their picks, which means that in some drafts teams may have more or less than two draft picks, although they must have at least one first-round pick every other year.

In 1968, the Rockets selected Elvin Hayes, who became an eventual Hall of Famer and one of the NBA's 50 Greatest Players, with the first pick of the draft. The Rockets again had the first pick of the draft in 1984, after winning a coin flip for the first pick against the Portland Trail Blazers, and they used it to select Hakeem Olajuwon, who later led the Rockets to two consecutive NBA championships in 1994 and 1995. In 2002, the Rockets won the first pick of the 2002 NBA draft through the lottery, and they chose Yao Ming, who became a six-time All-Star before his career was prematurely ended by chronic foot and ankle injuries.

== Key ==
Abbreviation	Meaning
PG	Point guard
SG	Shooting guard
SF	Small forward
PF	Power forward
C	Center

Naismith Basketball Hall of Famer	First overall NBA draft pick	Selected for an NBA All-Star Game

== Selections ==
Year	Round	Pick	Player	Nationality	Position	College/High School/Club
1967	1	7	Pat Riley (Note: Riley has been inducted into the Hall of Fame as a coach.)	USA	SG	Kentucky
1967	2	18	Bob Netolicky	USA	PF	Drake
1968	1	1	Elvin Hayes	USA	PF/C	Houston
1968	2	15	John Trapp	USA	SF	Nevada Southern
1969	1	6	Bingo Smith	USA	SG	Tulsa
1969	2	21	Bernie Williams	USA	SG	La Salle
1970	1	2	Rudy Tomjanovich	USA	SF/PF	Michigan
1970	2	18	Calvin Murphy	USA	PG	Niagara
1971	1	7	Cliff Meely	USA	PF/C	Colorado
1971	2	24	Mike Newlin	USA	SG	Utah
1972	2	20	John Gianelli	USA	PF/C	Pacific
1973	1	6	Ed Ratleff	USA	SG/SF	Long Beach State
1974	1	5	Bobby Jones	USA	SF	North Carolina
1974	2	23	Gus Bailey	USA	SG/SF	UTEP
1975	1	11	Joe Meriweather	USA	C	Southern Illinois
1975	2	29	Jim Blanks	USA	SF/SG	Gardner–Webb
1976	1	1	John Lucas (from Atlanta)^{[a]}	USA	PG	Maryland
1976	2	27	Phil Hicks	USA	PF	Tulane
1977	2	34	Larry Moffett (from Boston)^{[b]}	USA	PF	UNLV
1977	2	40	Robert Reid	USA	PF	St. Mary's (Texas)
1978	2	28	Buster Matheney (from Boston)^{[b]}	USA	PF	Utah
1979	1	17	Lee Johnson	USA	C	East Texas State
1979	2	42	Paul Mokeski (from Seattle)^{[c]}	USA	C	Kansas
1980	2	27	John Stroud (from New Jersey)^{[d]}	USA	PF	Mississippi
1980	2	38	Terry Stotts	USA	PF	Oklahoma
1980	2	43	Billy Williams (from Seattle)^{[c]}	USA	PF	Clemson
1981	2	45	Ed Turner (from Boston)^{[e]}	USA	SF	Texas A&I
1982	1	16	Terry Teagle	USA	SG	Baylor
1982	2	42	Jeff Taylor	USA	SG	Texas Tech
1983	1	1	Ralph Sampson	USA	C	Virginia
1983	1	3	Rodney McCray	USA	SF	Louisville
1984	1	1	Hakeem Olajuwon	NGA	C	Houston
1985	1	19	Steve Harris	USA	SG	Tulsa
1986	1	20	Buck Johnson	USA	SF/PF	Alabama
1986	2	43	Dave Feitl	USA	C	UTEP
1987	2	35	Doug Lee	USA	SG/SF	Purdue
1988	1	16	Derrick Chievous	USA	SF	Missouri
1990	1	12	Alec Kessler (traded to Miami)^{[f]}	USA	C	Georgia
1991	1	20	John Turner	USA	PF	Phillips
1991	2	47	Keith Hughes (traded to Cleveland)^{[g]}	USA	PF	Rutgers
1991	2	51	Zan Tabak (from Cleveland)^{[h]}	CRO	C	Jugoplastika Split (Croatia)
1992	1	11	Robert Horry	USA	PF	Alabama
1992	2	41	Popeye Jones	USA	PF	Murray State
1992	2	53	Curtis Blair	USA	PF	Richmond
1993	1	24	Sam Cassell	USA	PG	Florida State
1993	2	46	Richard Petruska	SVK	PF	UCLA
1993	2	50	Marcelo Nicola	ARG	PF	Taugres (Spain)
1994	2	41	Albert Burditt	USA	PF	Texas
1995	2	41	Erik Meek (from Dallas)^{[i]}	USA	C	Duke
1996	2	30	Othella Harrington (from Vancouver)^{[j]}	USA	PF	Georgetown
1996	2	42	Randy Livingston (from Vancouver)^{[j]}	USA	SG	LSU
1996	2	50	Terrell Bell	USA	PF	Georgia
1997	1	24	Rodrick Rhodes	USA	SF	USC
1997	2	29	Serge Zwikker (from Vancouver)^{[j]}	NED	C	North Carolina
1998	1	14	Michael Dickerson	USA	SG	Arizona
1998	1	16	Bryce Drew	USA	PG	Valparaiso
1998	1	18	Mirsad Türkcan	TUR	PF	Efes Pilsen (Turkey)
1998	2	41	Cuttino Mobley	USA	SG	Rhode Island
1999	1	22	Kenny Thomas	USA	PF	New Mexico
1999	2	44	Tyrone Washington (from Phoenix)^{[k]}	USA	PF	Mississippi State
1999	2	50	Venson Hamilton	USA	PF	Nebraska
2000	1	9	Joel Przybilla (traded to Milwaukee)^{[l]}	USA	C	Minnesota
2000	2	38	Eduardo Najera (traded to Dallas)^{[m]}	MEX	SF	Oklahoma
2001	1	13	Richard Jefferson (traded to New Jersey)^{[n]}	USA	SF	Arizona
2001	1	18	Jason Collins (from Orlando,^{[o]}traded to New Jersey)^{[n]}	USA	C	Stanford
2001	1	23	Brandon Armstrong (from Orlando,^{[o]} traded to New Jersey)^{[n]}	USA	SG	Pepperdine
2002	1	1	Yao Ming	CHN	C	Shanghai Sharks (China)
2002	1	15	Boštjan Nachbar (from Toronto)^{[p]}	SVN	SF	Benetton Treviso (Italy)
2002	2	37	Tito Maddox (from Miami)^{[q]}	USA	PG	Fresno State
2003	2	44	Malick Badiane	SEN	C	Deutsche Bank Skyliners (Germany)
2004	2	55	Luis Flores	DOM	PG	Manhattan
2005	1	24	Luther Head	USA	SG	Illinois
2006	1	8	Rudy Gay (traded to Memphis)^{[r]}	USA	SF	Connecticut
2006	2	32	Steve Novak	USA	PF	Marquette
2007	1	26	Aaron Brooks	USA	PG	Oregon
2007	2	31	Carl Landry (from Seattle via Memphis)^{[s]}	USA	PF	Purdue
2007	2	54	Brad Newley	AUS	SG	Townsville Crocodiles (Australia)
2008	1	25	Nicolas Batum (traded to Portland)^{[u]}	FRA	SF	Le Mans (France)
2008	2	33	Joey Dorsey (from Portland via Memphis)^{[u]}	USA	PF	Memphis
2008	2	54	Maarty Leunen	USA	PF	Oregon
2009	2	32	Jermaine Taylor (from Washington)^{[v]}	USA	SG	UCF
2009	2	34	Sergio Llull (from Denver via Oklahoma City)^{[v]}	ESP	PG	Real Madrid (Spain)
2009	2	44	Chase Budinger (from Detroit)^{[v]}	USA	SG/SF	Arizona
2010	1	14	Patrick Patterson	USA	PF	Kentucky
2011	1	14	Marcus Morris	USA	PF	Kansas
2011	1	23	Nikola Mirotić^{[w]}	ESP	PF	Real Madrid (Spain)
2011	2	38	Chandler Parsons	USA	SF	Florida
2012	1	12	Jeremy Lamb	USA	SG	Connecticut
2012	1	16	Royce White	USA	PF	Iowa State
2012	1	18	Terrence Jones	USA	PF	Kentucky
2012	2	44	Furkan Aldemir (from Los Angeles Clippers)^{[x]}	TUR	SF/PF	Galatasaray (Turkey)
2013	2	34	Isaiah Canaan (from Phoenix Suns)^{[y]}	USA	PG	Murray State
2014	1	25	Clint Capela	SUI	PF	Élan Chalon (France)
2014	2	42	Nick Johnson (from New York Knicks)^{[z]}	USA	PG/SG	Arizona
2015	1	18	Sam Dekker (from New Orleans)^{[aa]}	USA	SF	Wisconsin
2015	2	32	Montrezl Harrell (from New York)^{[z]}	USA	PF	Louisville
2016	2	37	Chinanu Onuaku (from New York via Portland and Sacramento)^{[ab]}	USA	PF/C	Louisville
2016	2	43	Zhou Qi	CHN	C	Xinjiang Flying Tigers (China)
2017	2	43	Isaiah Hartenstein (from Denver)^{[ac]}	GER	PF/C	Žalgiris Kaunas (Lithuania)
2017	2	45	Dillon Brooks (from Portland,^{[ad]} traded to Memphis)^{[ae]}	CAN	SF	Oregon
2018	2	46	De’Anthony Melton (from Miami via Memphis)^{[af]}	USA	SG	USC
2021	1	2	Jalen Green	USA	SG	G League Ignite
2021	1	23	Usman Garuba (from Portland)^{[ag]}	ESP	PF/C	Real Madrid (Spain)
2021	1	24	Josh Christopher (from Milwaukee)^{[ah]}	USA	SG	Arizona
2022	1	3	Jabari Smith Jr.	USA	PF	Auburn
2022	1	17	Tari Eason (from Nets)^{[ai]}	USA	PF	LSU
2023	1	4	Amen Thompson	USA	PG	OTE
2023	1	20	Cam Whitmore	USA	PF	Villanova
2024	1	3	Reed Sheppard	USA	SG	Kentucky

== Footnotes ==
- ^{a} On June 7, 1976, the Rockets traded Joe Meriweather, Gus Bailey and their first round draft pick to the Atlanta Hawks for Atlanta's first-round draft pick.
- ^{b} On June 9, 1977, the Rockets traded John Johnson to the Boston Celtics for Boston's 1977 and 1978 second-round draft picks.
- ^{c} On October 22, 1977, the Rockets traded John Johnson to the Seattle SuperSonics for Seattle's 1979 and 1980 second-round draft picks.
- ^{d} On October 12, 1979, the Rockets traded Mike Newlin to the New Jersey Nets for cash and New Jersey's 1980 second-round draft pick.
- ^{e} On June 9, 1978, the Boston Celtics signed Kevin Kunnert, and in compensation, the Rockets received cash and the Celtics' 1981 second-round draft pick.
- ^{f} On 27 June 1990, Houston traded Alec Kessler to the Miami Heat for Dave Jamerson and Carl Herrera.
- ^{g} On 26 June 1991, Houston traded Keith Hughes to the Cleveland Cavaliers for a second round draft in 1996 and future considerations.
- ^{h} On February 27, 1990, Houston traded Derrick Chievous to the Cleveland Cavaliers for Cleveland's 1991, 1992, and 1993 second-round picks.
- ^{i} On February 23, 1995, Houston traded Scott Brooks to the Dallas Mavericks for Morlon Wiley and Dallas's second-round pick.
- ^{j} On June 19, 1996, Houston traded Pete Chilcutt, Tim Breaux, two 1996 draft picks, and a 1997 draft pick to the Vancouver Grizzlies for two 1996 draft picks and one 1997 draft pick.
- ^{k} In August 1996, Houston traded Chucky Brown, Mark Bryant, Sam Cassell, and Robert Horry to the Phoenix Suns in exchange for Charles Barkley and a 1999 second-round draft pick.
- ^{l} On June 28, 2008, Houston traded Joel Przybilla to the Milwaukee Bucks in exchange for Jason Collier and a future first-round draft pick.
- ^{m} On June 28, 2008, Houston traded Eduardo Nájera and a future second-round draft pick to the Dallas Mavericks in exchange for Dan Langhi.
- ^{n} On June 27, 2001, the Rockets traded Richard Jefferson, Jason Collins, and Brandon Armstrong to the New Jersey Nets for Eddie Griffin.
- ^{o} On June 2, 2002, the Rockets traded their 22nd first-round pick to the Orlando Magic for their 23rd first-round pick.
- ^{p} On August 2, 2001, the Rockets traded Hakeem Olajuwon to the Toronto Raptors for future first and second-round draft picks.
- ^{q} On June 18, 2002, the Rockets traded their second-round pick to the Miami Heat for the Heat's second-round pick.
- ^{r} On June 28, 2006, the Rockets traded Stromile Swift and the draft rights to Rudy Gay to the Memphis Grizzlies for Shane Battier.
- ^{s} On June 28, 2007, the Rockets traded cash considerations and a future second-round pick to the Seattle SuperSonics in exchange for the draft rights to Carl Landry.
- ^{t} On July 17, 2007, the Rockets traded Greek guard Vassilis Spanoulis and a 2009 second-round pick to the San Antonio Spurs in exchange for reserve center Jackie Butler and the draft rights to Luis Scola.
- ^{u} On June 26, 2008, the Rockets completed a three-way transaction that sent Nicolas Batum to the Portland Trail Blazers, Darrell Arthur to the Memphis Grizzlies and Donté Greene and Joey Dorsey and Memphis's 2009 second-round pick to the Rockets.
- ^{v} On June 25, 2009, the Rockets spent roughly $6 million to acquire the 32nd, 34th, and 44th picks in the second-round from the Washington Wizards, the Denver Nuggets, and the Detroit Pistons, respectively.
- ^{w} On June 23, 2011, the Rockets acquired point guard Jonny Flynn and Lithuanian big man (Minnesota's 20th pick) Donatas Motiejūnas in a trade with Minnesota Timberwolves during Thursday night's NBA draft and sent center Brad Miller and Houston's 23rd pick (Nikola Mirotić) to the Minnesota Timberwolves.
- ^{x} On June 30, 2012, the Rockets acquired the draft rights to Furkan Aldemir from the Los Angeles Clippers in a trade with three other teams: Los Angeles Clippers, Dallas Mavericks, and Utah Jazz.
- ^{y} On February 21, 2013, the Rockets acquired the Phoenix Suns' 2013 second round pick (the 34th pick) in exchange for Marcus Morris.
- ^{z} On July 11, 2012, the Rockets acquired the New York Knicks' 2014 second-round pick (the 42nd pick), along with three players and a 2015 second-round pick (the 32nd pick), in exchange for Marcus Camby.
- ^{aa} On July 15, 2014, the Houston Rockets acquired Alonzo Gee, Scotty Hopson and a conditional 2015 first-round pick (protected top 3 and 20–30 in 2015) from New Orleans and Trevor Ariza from Washington (sign and trade) in exchange for Ömer Aşık, Omri Casspi and cash considerations (to Houston), while Washington Wizards also acquired Melvin Ely from New Orleans.
- ^{ab} On September 17, 2014, the Rockets acquired Jason Terry, a 2015 second-round pick, and Portland's 2016 second-round pick from Sacramento in exchange for Alonzo Gee, Scotty Hopson, and a trade exception. Previously, on July 10, 2013, the Kings acquired a 2016 second round pick (with an option to swap selections with New Orleans) and a 2018 second round pick from Portland in a three-team trade with New Orleans Pelicans. Previously, on July 15, 2012, the Knicks acquired Raymond Felton and Kurt Thomas from the Portland Trail Blazers in exchange for Jared Jeffries, the rights to Dan Gadzuric, the future selections of Kostas Papanikolaou and Georgios Printezis, and their 2016 second round selection.
- ^{ac} On July 20, 2015, Houston acquired Ty Lawson and Denver's 2017 second-round pick for Joey Dorsey, Nick Johnson, Kostas Papanikolaou, Pablo Prigioni, Houston's 2016 lottery-protected first-round pick, and cash considerations.
- ^{ad} On July 10, 2013, Houston acquired draft rights to #45 Marko Todorović, draft rights to 2012 #48 Kostas Papanikolaou, and two future second-round picks from Portland for Thomas Robinson
- ^{ae} On June 22, 2017, Memphis acquired Houston's second-round pick (No. 45) for the Grizzlies' future second-round pick.
- ^{af} On June 22, 2017, Houston acquired the worst 2018 second-round pick between Charlotte, Memphis, and Miami from Memphis for the draft rights to Dillon Brooks. Previously, on February 16, 2016, Memphis acquired Chris Andersen, a 2018 second-round pick, and a top-55 protected 2019 second-round pick from Miami in a three-team trade with Charlotte.
- ^{ag} On November 22, 2020, Houston acquired a protected 2021 first round draft pick in exchange for Trevor Ariza and Isaiah Stewart
- ^{ah} On March 29, 2021, Houston acquired D. J. Augustin, D. J. Wilson, a 2023 first-round pick, and option to swap a 2021 second-round pick with Milwaukee's 2021 first-round pick
- ^{ai} On January 16, 2021, Houston acquired Victor Oladipo, Dante Exum, Rodions Kurucs, a 2022 first-round draft selection, 2024 first-round draft selection, 2026 first-round draft selection, rights to swap first-round draft selections in 2021, 2023, 2025, and 2027, and a 2022 first-round draft selection (from Milwaukee) for James Harden
