= Hank Williams (basketball) =

American basketball player

Personal information
- Born: April 28, 1952 (age 74) Norristown, Pennsylvania, U.S.
- Listed height: 6 ft 5 in (1.96 m)
- Listed weight: 210 lb (95 kg)

Career information
- High school: Eisenhower (Norristown, Pennsylvania)
- College: Jacksonville (1972–1974)
- NBA draft: 1975: 6th round, 100th overall pick
- Drafted by: New York Knicks
- Position: Small forward
- Number: 44

Career history
- 1974–1975: Utah Stars
- 1975–1978: Lancaster Red Roses
- Stats at Basketball Reference

Henry Williams (born April 28, 1952) is an American former professional basketball player. He played in 39 games for the Utah Stars in the American Basketball Association. Williams was declared ineligible by the NCAA to play his senior season at Jacksonville University in 1974–75 for accepting money from an organization that represented professional athletes. He is no relation to country singers Hank Williams III, Hank Williams Jr. and Hank Williams.

== Career statistics ==
Legend
| GP | Games played | GS | Games started | MPG | Minutes per game |
| FG% | Field goal percentage | 3P% | 3-point field goal percentage | FT% | Free throw percentage |
| RPG | Rebounds per game | APG | Assists per game | SPG | Steals per game |
| BPG | Blocks per game | PPG | Points per game | **Bold** | Career high |

=== ABA ===
==== Regular season ====
| Year | Team | GP | GS | MPG | FG% | 3P% | FT% | RPG | APG | SPG | BPG | PPG |
|---|---|---|---|---|---|---|---|---|---|---|---|---|
| 1974–75 | Utah | 39 | | 11.6 | .436 | .136 | .783 | 2.3 | .6 | .4 | .1 | 4.2 |

==== Playoffs ====
| Year | Team | GP | GS | MPG | FG% | 3P% | FT% | RPG | APG | SPG | BPG | PPG |
|---|---|---|---|---|---|---|---|---|---|---|---|---|
| 1974–75 | Utah | 2 | | 3.5 | .333 | – | – | 1.0 | .0 | .0 | .0 | 2.0 |
