= Moses Malone =

American basketball player (1955–2015)

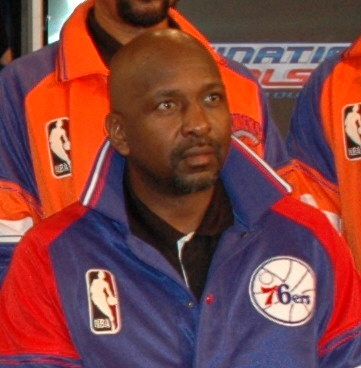
- Malone in 2005

Personal information
- Born: March 23, 1955 Petersburg, Virginia, U.S.
- Died: September 13, 2015 (aged 60) Norfolk, Virginia, U.S.
- Listed height: 6 ft 10 in (2.08 m)
- Listed weight: 260 lb (118 kg)

Career information
- High school: Petersburg (Petersburg, Virginia)
- ABA draft: 1974: 3rd round, 28th overall pick
- Drafted by: Utah Stars
- Playing career: 1974–1995
- Position: Center
- Number: 22, 13, 20, 21, 24, 2, 4, 8
- Coaching career: 2006–2009

Career history

Playing
- 1974–1975: Utah Stars
- 1975–1976: Spirits of St. Louis
- 1976: Buffalo Braves
- 1976–1982: Houston Rockets
- 1982–1986: Philadelphia 76ers
- 1986–1988: Washington Bullets
- 1988–1991: Atlanta Hawks
- 1991–1993: Milwaukee Bucks
- 1993–1994: Philadelphia 76ers
- 1994–1995: San Antonio Spurs

Coaching
- 2006–2009: Philadelphia 76ers (assistant)

Career highlights
- NBA champion (1983); NBA Finals MVP (1983); 3× NBA Most Valuable Player (1979, 1982, 1983); 12× NBA All-Star (1978–1989); ABA All-Star (1975); 4× All-NBA First Team (1979, 1982, 1983, 1985); 4× All-NBA Second Team (1980, 1981, 1984, 1987); NBA All-Defensive First Team (1983); NBA All-Defensive Second Team (1979); ABA All-Rookie Team (1975); 6× NBA rebounding leader (1979, 1981–1985); NBA anniversary team (50th, 75th); ABA All-Time Team; No. 2 retired by Philadelphia 76ers; No. 24 retired by Houston Rockets; National high school player of the year (1974); First-team Parade All-American (1974); Fourth-team Parade All-American (1973)

Career ABA and NBA statistics
- Points: 29,580 (20.3 ppg)
- Rebounds: 17,834 (12.3 rpg)
- Blocks: 1,889 (1.3 bpg)
- Stats at NBA.com
- Stats at Basketball Reference
- Basketball Hall of Fame

Moses Eugene Malone Sr. (March 23, 1955 – September 13, 2015) was an American professional basketball player who played in both the American Basketball Association (ABA) and the National Basketball Association (NBA) from 1974 through 1995. A center, he was named the NBA Most Valuable Player (MVP) three times, was a 12-time NBA All-Star and an eight-time All-NBA Team selection. Malone led the Philadelphia 76ers to an NBA championship in 1983, winning both the league and Finals MVP. He was inducted into the Naismith Memorial Basketball Hall of Fame in his first year of eligibility in 2001. Malone is widely regarded as one of the greatest centers and players of all time.

Malone began his professional career out of high school after he was selected in the third round of the 1974 ABA draft by the Utah Stars. He was named an ABA All-Star as a rookie and played two seasons in the league until it merged with the NBA in 1976. He landed in the NBA with the Buffalo Braves, who traded him after two games to the Houston Rockets. Malone became a five-time All-Star in six seasons with the Rockets. After leading the NBA in rebounding in 1979, he was named league MVP for the first time. He led the Rockets to the NBA Finals in 1981, and won his second MVP award in 1982. Traded to Philadelphia the following season, he repeated as MVP and led the 76ers to the 1983 championship. In his first of two stints with Philadelphia, he was an All-Star in each of his four seasons. Following another trade, Malone was an All-Star in his only two seasons with the then Washington Bullets (today's Wizards). He signed as a free agent with the Atlanta Hawks, earning his 12th straight and final NBA All-Star selection in his first season. In his later years, he played with the Milwaukee Bucks before returning to the 76ers and completing his career with the San Antonio Spurs.

Malone was a tireless and physical player who led the NBA in rebounding six times, including a then-record five straight seasons (1981–1985). Nicknamed the "Chairman of the Boards" for his rebounding prowess, he finished his career as the all-time leader in offensive rebounds after leading both the ABA and NBA in the category a combined nine times. Combining his ABA and NBA statistics, Malone ranks tenth all-time in career points (29,580) and third in total rebounds (17,834). He was named to the ABA All-Time Team along with the NBA's 50th and 75th anniversary teams.

== Early life ==
Malone was born in Petersburg, Virginia. He was an only child, raised primarily by his mother, Mary, who had dropped out of school after finishing the fifth grade. When Malone was two years old, Mary forced her husband to move out of their home due to his alcohol use. Malone's father then moved to Texas.

Malone attended Petersburg High School, where he played basketball for the school's Crimson Wave. The team went undefeated in his final two years, winning 50 games and back-to-back Virginia state championships. Malone signed a letter of intent to play college basketball for the University of Maryland under head coach Lefty Driesell.

== ABA career ==
=== Utah Stars (1974–1975) ===
After the Utah Stars of the American Basketball Association (ABA) selected him in the third round of the 1974 ABA Draft, Malone decided to become a professional, becoming the first player in modern professional basketball to enter directly from high school. He began his professional career with Utah in the 1974–75 season after signing a five-year contract worth $1 million. At 6 ft 10 in (2.08 m) and a somewhat skinny 215 pounds (98 kg) at the time, Malone began his pro career playing at forward until he bulked up enough to handle the rigors at center. As a rookie, he was named an ABA All-Star and earned ABA All-Rookie honors. In the 1975 ABA Playoffs, Malone averaged 22.7 points, 17.5 rebounds, and 1.5 blocks per game during a first round loss to the Denver Nuggets. After Malone's rookie season concluded, the Chicago Bulls would try and draft him in the tenth round of the 1975 NBA draft, but their selection of him was considered ineligible due to the NBA's four-year rule at the time.

=== Spirits of St. Louis (1975–1976) ===
Malone had been sidelined during all of the 1975–76 season for Utah with a leg injury when the Stars folded 16 games into the season. He was sold to the ABA's Spirits of St. Louis to help pay down the Stars' debts, alongside Utah teammates Ron Boone, Randy Denton, and Steve Green. He played for the Spirits for the remainder of the 1975–76 season, though they did not make the playoffs since they finished with a 35–49 record. In his two seasons with the ABA, Malone averaged 17.2 points and 12.9 rebounds per game.

== NBA career ==
=== Buffalo Braves (1976) ===
The ABA–NBA merger occurred after the 1975–76 season, but the Spirits of St. Louis were not among the ABA teams chosen to join the NBA. Malone had already been selected by the NBA's New Orleans Jazz in a December 1975 pre-merger draft for ABA players of undergraduate age. However, the NBA let them place Malone into the 1976 ABA Dispersal Draft pool in exchange for the return of their first-round draft pick in 1977, which they used to trade for Gail Goodrich. In the 1976 dispersal draft, which was held for the remaining ABA players whose teams did not join the NBA, Malone was selected by the Portland Trail Blazers with the fifth overall pick.

The Blazers, who had also acquired power forward Maurice Lucas in the draft, chose Malone for trading purposes. With a frontline of Lucas, Bill Walton and Lloyd Neal, Portland figured Malone would see little action. They traded him to the Buffalo Braves prior to the first game of the 1976–77 season for a first-round draft choice in the 1978 NBA draft and $232,000. Malone played in two games with Buffalo. Because they could not meet Malone's demands for playing time, they then traded him to the Houston Rockets in exchange for first-round draft picks in the 1977 and 1978 drafts.

=== Houston Rockets (1976–1982) ===
==== 1976–77 season ====
With the Houston Rockets, Malone played forward opposite Rudy Tomjanovich. He appeared in 82 games overall for both Buffalo and Houston and finished the season averaging 13.2 points per game (ppg) with 13.1 rebounds per game (rpg), ranking third in rpg. Malone set a then-NBA record with 437 offensive rebounds in a season, going on to surpass the mark two years later. Malone also blocked 2.21 shots per game, the seventh-most in the league. In the second game of the Eastern Conference Semifinals against the Washington Bullets, Malone recorded 15 offensive rebounds in the overtime win, setting an NBA playoff record. The Rockets reached the Eastern Conference Finals, where they lost 4–2 to the Philadelphia 76ers, his future team.

==== 1977–78 season: First All-Star selection ====
During his second season in the NBA, Malone was diagnosed with a stress fracture in his right foot, which caused him to miss the final 23 games. Despite the time missed to injury, Malone led the NBA with 380 total offensive rebounds and finished second with 15.0 rpg. His scoring improved to 19.4 ppg, and he made his first appearance in an NBA All-Star Game in 1978.

==== 1978–79 season: First MVP award ====
During the 1978–79 season, Malone emerged as one of the top centers in the league after gaining 15 pounds (6.8 kg) in the offseason. He averaged 24.8 points with a career-best .540 shooting percentage and established another career high with a league-leading 17.6 rpg while winning the NBA Most Valuable Player Award. He again led the league in offensive rebounds, setting an all-time single-season record with 587 offensive rebounds. He was voted to the All-NBA First Team and the All-Defensive Second Team. He was also voted by fans to start for the East at center in the 1979 NBA All-Star Game. On February 9, he grabbed a career-high 37 rebounds versus the New Orleans Jazz. Although the Rockets qualified for the playoffs, they were eliminated by the Atlanta Hawks in a first-round sweep. Malone averaged 24.5 points and 20.5 rebounds in the two games.

==== 1979–80 season ====
In 1979–80, Malone averaged 25.8 points, fifth-best in the NBA, and 14.5 rebounds, second-best in the league. He was named an All-Star for a third straight season and was also named to the All-NBA Second Team. In the opening round of the playoffs, Houston defeated the San Antonio Spurs in a best-of-three series. Malone registered 37 points and 20 rebounds in the deciding third game, leading the Rockets to a 141–120 victory. In the conference semifinals, the Rockets lost in a sweep to the Boston Celtics.

==== 1980–81 season: First NBA Finals appearance ====
In the 1980–81 season, Malone led the league with 14.8 rpg in 80 games and was again an All-Star as well as a member of the All-NBA Second Team. He finished second in scoring (28.8) to Adrian Dantley (30.7). On March 11, Malone scored 51 points against the Golden State Warriors. That postseason, Malone advanced the Rockets to the 1981 NBA Finals, by scoring 36 points and grabbing 11 rebounds in a decisive Game 5 Western Conference Finals win over the Kansas City Kings. In the finals, despite Malone averaging 22.3 points, 15.7 rebounds, and 2.2 blocks a game, he and the Rockets lost in six games to the Boston Celtics.

==== 1981–82 season: Second MVP award ====
In their first season in the Midwest Division, Houston and the Kansas City Kings tied for second place with identical 40–42 records. During the 1981-82 NBA season, Malone averaged 31.1 points with 14.7 rebounds and won his second MVP award. He repeated as the NBA leader in rebounds and was the runner-up for the league's scoring title to George Gervin (32.3). He was also the league leader in offensive rebounds (558) and minutes played (3,398, 42.0 per game). At the end of the season Malone earned his second placement on the All-NBA First Team. He set a career-high in scoring average and also set a single-game career-high with 53 points on February 2 against the San Diego Clippers. Nine days later, on February 11 against the Seattle SuperSonics, Malone eclipsed his own league record with 21 offensive rebounds. In Malone's last season in Houston the Rockets followed their NBA Finals appearance in 1981 with a first-round exit in the 1982 playoffs. Though he averaged 24.0 points with 17.0 rebounds, Seattle defeated Houston 2–1.

=== Philadelphia 76ers (1982–1986) ===
==== 1982–83 season: Championship season and Finals MVP ====
Malone became a restricted free agent after the 1981–82 season. He signed an offer sheet of six-years for $13.2 million with the Philadelphia 76ers on September 2, 1982. The 76ers were coming off a 4–2 loss in the Finals to the Los Angeles Lakers, whose center, Kareem Abdul-Jabbar, outplayed their big-man duo of Darryl Dawkins and Caldwell Jones. The Rockets franchise was sold, and the new owners decided that Malone's $2 million annual salary did not fit their plans. Houston matched the offer and agreed to trade Malone to the 76ers for Jones and their first-round pick in the 1983 NBA draft on September 15. With Julius Erving, Maurice Cheeks, Andrew Toney, and Bobby Jones, the Sixers ran away from the league en route to the NBA championship. Malone was named the league MVP for the second straight year, becoming the only NBA player ever to win the award in consecutive seasons with two different teams, a feat matched only by Barry Bonds (1992–1993) and Shohei Ohtani (2023–2024) in the four major American sports leagues.

That year, Malone averaged 15.3 rebounds per game, which led the league for the third consecutive year, and also averaged 24.5 points, which was fifth-best in the NBA. He was an All-Star for the sixth consecutive season and earned first-team honors on both the All-NBA and All-Defensive teams. The 76ers lost only one game in the postseason as they won the league championship, defeating the Lakers in a 4–0 sweep in the 1983 NBA Finals. In 13 playoff games, Malone averaged 26.0 points with 15.8 rebounds. He was named the Finals MVP, having outrebounded Abdul-Jabbar 72–30 in the series. It was also around this time that Malone began to tutor Hakeem Olajuwon, passing on the torch to the future Rockets superstar.

His head coach Billy Cunningham said, "Let's not make believe. The difference from last year was Moses." Before the playoffs began, Malone predicted in Southern vernacular that Philadelphia would go "fo, fo, fo", envisioning a four-game sweep in each of the playoffs' three rounds, playing the minimum 12 games. His prediction (and its formulation) became famous: The New York Times called it "an enduring quotation" and "an unforgettable line," and Comcast SportsNet called it "one of the greatest rallying cries ever uttered." As it transpired, the Sixers only lost one playoff game (Game 4 of the Eastern Conference Finals to the Milwaukee Bucks) en route to making Malone a world champion for the first time, sweeping the Knicks in the first round and the Lakers in the finals. This led to the inside of that year's championship ring being inscribed "fo' fi' fo (four, five, four)." The 76ers' 12–1 cruise through the 1983 playoffs was, at the time, the most dominant playoff run in NBA history.

==== 1983–84 season ====
In the 1983–84 season Malone led the league in rebounding with 13.4 rpg. He was limited to 71 games that season due to ankle injuries, his lowest since the 1977–78 season. Malone scored 22.7 ppg in his second season with Philadelphia and was named to the All-NBA Second Team. Malone was selected again for the All-Star Game but he was unable to play because of an ankle injury. During the season he averaged 21.4 points with 13.8 rebounds in five games in the playoffs, but Philadelphia lost in a first-round upset against the New Jersey Nets.

==== 1984–85 season ====
The Sixers selected Charles Barkley in the 1984 NBA draft. When he reported to training camp at 300 pounds (140 kg), Malone began to mentor him, encouraging him to get in better shape. Barkley got down to 255 pounds (116 kg) and made the NBA All-Rookie Team. In the 1984–85 season, Malone recorded 13.1 rpg, leading the NBA in rebounding for a record-setting fifth straight season (since surpassed by Dennis Rodman with seven consecutive seasons). He was voted by a fan ballot to the All-Star team for the eighth time and finished the season with 24.6 ppg, which ranked ninth-best in the league. He received his fourth All-NBA First Team honor and finished third in the NBA Most Valuable Player Award balloting; the award was won by Larry Bird. Malone scored his 15,000th NBA point on November 28, and grabbed his 10,000th NBA rebound on March 29. He scored 51 points against the Detroit Pistons on November 14. The 76ers reached the Eastern Conference Finals in 1985 but were defeated 4–1 by the Celtics.

==== 1985–86 season ====
Malone's 1985–86 season ended when he suffered an orbital fracture in his right eye in a March 28 game against the Bucks. Despite hopes that he might return during the playoffs, he was ruled out for the postseason. In the Eastern Conference Semifinals, Philadelphia lost 4–3 to the Bucks. Malone averaged 23.8 points with 11.8 rebounds in 74 appearances that season. He ranked seventh in the league in scoring and fourth in rebounding, ending his five-season streak as the NBA rebounding champion. Malone was named an All-Star, but he was not named to the All-NBA Team, the first time he was not selected since 1978.

=== Washington Bullets (1986–1988) ===
Shortly after the 1985–86 season, Philadelphia traded Malone, Terry Catledge, and two first-round draft picks to the Washington Bullets in exchange for Jeff Ruland and Clifford T. Robinson. Malone bounced back from an injury-shortened 1985–86 campaign, averaging 24.1 points with 11.3 rebounds. He was named to his 10th consecutive All-Star Game and again was named to the All-NBA Second Team. Malone was the only player to finish in the top 10 in both ppg and rpg; he placed ninth in both categories.

Malone scored his 20,000th NBA point on April 12 against the Detroit Pistons. He scored 50 points versus the New Jersey Nets on April 8, joining Earl Monroe (56) and Phil Chenier (52) as the only Bullets players ever to score 50 points in a game. Washington appeared in the postseason but was swept by the Pistons in the first round. Malone averaged 20.7 points and 12.7 rebounds in the series.

In his 12th NBA season, Malone ranked eighth in the NBA in rebounding (11.2) and 19th in scoring (20.3). Malone was named to his 11th consecutive All-Star Game in 1988. Malone scored in double figures in 76 of 79 games and recorded 55 double-doubles for the year. The Bullets reached the 1988 NBA Playoffs, but lost to Detroit 3–2 in their first-round series. Malone averaged 18.6 points with 11.2 rebounds in the series.

=== Atlanta Hawks (1988–1991) ===
==== 1988–89 season: Final All-Star selection ====
Before the 1988–89 season, Malone agreed to a three-year deal to play with the Atlanta Hawks. The Hawks, featuring Dominique Wilkins, had won at least 50 games in the prior three seasons, and believed the free-agent center was a missing piece to a potential championship team. During the season, Malone averaged 20.2 points with 11.8 rebounds, becoming the first and only player in professional history to average 20 points and 10 rebounds for four different teams. He was voted by a fan ballot to the 1989 NBA All-Star Game, which was his 12th straight and final appearance. Malone reached double figures in points in 75 of his 81 games and recorded double figures in rebounds 55 times. On February 4, 1989, he scored a season-high 37 points against the Phoenix Suns. The Hawks were eliminated in the first round of the playoffs by Milwaukee. In the series, Malone scored 21.0 ppg and had 12.0 rpg.

==== 1989–90 season ====
The following season, Malone finished with 18.9 ppg and 10.0 rpg, ending a string of 11 consecutive 20–10 campaigns. Malone led the NBA with 364 offensive rebounds and tied for eighth in rpg. In Mike Fratello's final year as head coach, Atlanta finished with a 41–41 record, failing to qualify for the playoffs. Malone began the 1990–91 season as the Hawks' starting center, but after 15 games, Atlanta's new coach, Bob Weiss, made Jon Koncak the starter and Malone his backup for the final 67 contests.

==== 1990–91 season ====
Coming off the bench for the first time in his career, Malone averaged 10.6 points with 8.1 rebounds in 23.3 minutes per game while starting just 18 of 82 games played during the 1990–91 season—all career lows at that point. On November 3, against the Indiana Pacers, Malone became the NBA career leader in free throws made with 7,695, besting the previous record set by Oscar Robertson. On November 21, against the Bucks, Malone scored his 25,000th career point. On March 15, he recorded his 15,000th career rebound against the Dallas Mavericks. Malone surpassed Wilt Chamberlain's mark of consecutive games without fouling out with his 1,046th straight game against the Detroit Pistons on April 19. The Hawks returned to the playoffs but were eliminated in the first round by Detroit, 3–2. In the series, Malone averaged just 4.2 points with 6.2 rebounds.

=== Milwaukee Bucks (1991–1993) ===
A free agent after the 1990–91 season, Malone signed a two-year contract with the Milwaukee Bucks. Malone was reported to earn $1.6 million in the first season and $2 million for the second season. Malone once again started at center during the 1991–92 season, averaging 15.6 points with 9.1 rebounds while playing in all 82 games. He led the Bucks in rebounding and finished second on the team in scoring. He scored a season-high 30 points twice and grabbed 19 rebounds against the Seattle SuperSonics on March 27. Milwaukee finished with a 31–51 record, tied for last place of the Central Division with the Charlotte Hornets.

After one practice in training camp in October 1992, Malone was sidelined due to a herniated disc in his back. After trying to play through the pain, he decided to have surgery in November. Recovery from the surgery caused Malone to miss the majority of the 1992–93 season. He returned to the Bucks on March 27, appearing in 11 games during the remainder of the season. Struggling with the younger players on their roster, the Bucks finished 28–54 and last in the Central Division.

=== Return to Philadelphia (1993–1994) ===
The Philadelphia 76ers signed Malone as a free agent in August, so that he could serve as a backup and mentor to 7-foot-6-inch (2.29 m) rookie Shawn Bradley. Malone appeared in 55 games as a reserve for the 76ers, averaging 5.3 points with 4.1 rebounds.

=== San Antonio Spurs (1994–1995) ===
In 1994, Malone signed with the San Antonio Spurs, where he was used as a back-up center to David Robinson. The 1994–95 NBA season was his last in the NBA, and at that time, he was the only remaining active former ABA player. During the final game of his NBA career, against the Charlotte Hornets, he hit a buzzer-beating three-point shot from the opposing free throw line, 74 feet (23 m) away from the basket. He played 17 games for the Spurs.

== Player profile ==
Malone stood 6 feet 10 inches (2.08 m) and weighed 260 pounds (120 kg). Described as "relentless" and "a force on the boards like no other," he pounded his opponents into submission with ferocious effort and physical play. Nicknamed "Chairman of the Boards" for his rebounding prowess, he was notable for rebounding and scoring off his own misses, possessing the strength, quickness, and zeal to recover the ball before his opponents. This led to some contending he intentionally missed shots to pad his rebounding statistics. He was not a very good passer. When Carroll Dawson, an assistant coach with the Rockets, suggested that Malone needed to improve his passing, he replied, "They ain't paying me to pass."

He finished his career with the most combined ABA and NBA offensive rebounds (7,382), 35 percent over runner-up Artis Gilmore. Nine times he led his respective league in offensive rebounds, and five other times he finished in the top three. He also holds NBA records for the most offensive rebounds in a career (6,731), season (587), and game (21). Malone was a 13-time All-Star, and earned eight All-NBA selections, ranking ninth all-time with 29,580 points, and third with 17,834 rebounds. He is one of three players to exceed 28,000 points and 17,000 rebounds. (Note: Along with Wilt Chamberlain and Kareem Abdul-Jabbar) He also ranks second all-time in free throws made (9,018) and attempted (11,864). Malone is one of just nine players who have been named NBA MVP three or more times. He led the league in rebounds six times, including five straight from 1980 through 1985. He was inducted into the Naismith Memorial Basketball Hall of Fame in his first year of eligibility in 2001. The Rockets retired his No. 24 jersey in 1998, and the 76ers retired his No. 2 on February 8, 2019. Although the 76ers had offered to retire Malone's jersey previously, Malone insisted that all of his teammates on the 76ers be included on the banner, a request that the team fulfilled when they did retire his number. In addition to retiring Malone's jersey number, the 76ers also unveiled a statue in front of the team's training facility in Camden, New Jersey. In 2022, to commemorate the NBA's 75th Anniversary The Athletic ranked their top 75 players of all time, and named Malone as the 18th greatest player in NBA history.

== Awards and honors ==
- NBA champion: 1983
- NBA Finals MVP: 1983
- 3× NBA Most Valuable Player: 1979, 1982, 1983
- 13× All-Star
  - 12× NBA All-Star: 1978–1989
  - ABA All-Star: 1975
- 8x All-NBA Team selections:
  - 4× First Team: 1979, 1982, 1983, 1985
  - 4× Second Team: 1980, 1981, 1984, 1987
- 2x NBA All-Defensive Team selections:
  - First Team: 1983
  - Second Team: 1979
- ABA All-Rookie Team: 1975
- 6× NBA rebounding leader: 1979, 1981–1985
- 3× NBA free throw scoring leaders: 1983, 1985, 1986
- 2× NBA minutes played leaders: 1979, 1982
- No. 2 retired by the Philadelphia 76ers
- No. 24 retired by the Houston Rockets
- NBA 50th Anniversary Team (1996)
- ABA All-Time Team (1997)
- NBA 75th Anniversary Team (2021)
- Naismith Memorial Basketball Hall of Fame (class of 2001)

== Personal life ==
Malone and his wife, Alfreda Gill, (married in 1982) had two sons, Moses Eugene Jr. and Michael Malone. Alfreda sued for divorce in September 1991, on the grounds of irreconcilable differences, cruelty, and adultery. She got a restraining order in June 1992, ordering Malone to refrain from contact with her during the course of the lawsuit. At that time, Malone denied allegations that he abused his wife or threatened to kill her. The divorce was granted in October 1992.

In January 1993, Malone was arrested driving in Galveston, Texas, across Galveston Bay from his former wife's home, for having violated a peace bond Alfreda had obtained. Her affidavit for its issuance alleged that Malone had stalked her, illegally entered her home in League City, Texas, damaged her property and threatened to kill her. Malone posted bail and was released.

Malone dated Leah Nash, whom he had met in 2006, though they did not marry nor live together. They had a son, Micah Francois Malone, who was six years old at the time of Malone's death.

=== Death ===
Malone died in his sleep from heart disease at the age of 60, on the morning of September 13, 2015, at a hotel in Norfolk, Virginia. He had been scheduled to play in a charity golf tournament that day and was found unresponsive in his room when he did not appear for breakfast or answer his phone. Malone had previously complained of an irregular heartbeat and was reported to have been wearing a heart monitor when he died.

== NBA/ABA career statistics ==
Legend
GP	Games played	GS	Games started	MPG	Minutes per game
FG%	Field goal percentage	3P%	3-point field goal percentage	FT%	Free throw percentage
RPG	Rebounds per game	APG	Assists per game	SPG	Steals per game
BPG	Blocks per game	PPG	Points per game	**Bold**	Career high
†	Won an NBA championship	*	Led the league

=== Regular season ===
Year	Team	GP	GS	MPG	FG%	3P%	FT%	RPG	APG	SPG	BPG	PPG
1974–75	Utah (ABA)	**83**	—	38.6	**.571**	.000	.635	14.6	1.0	1.0	1.5	18.8
1975–76	St. Louis (ABA)	43	—	27.2	.512	.000	.612	9.6	1.3	.6	.7	14.3
1976–77	Buffalo	2	—	3.0	—	—	—	.5	.0	.0	.0	.0
1976–77	Houston	80	—	31.3	.480	—	.693	13.4	1.1	.8	**2.3**	13.5
1977–78	Houston	59	—	35.7	.499	—	.718	15.0	.5	.8	1.3	19.4
1978–79	Houston	82*	—	41.3*	.540	—	.739	**17.6***	**1.8**	1.0	1.5	24.8
1979–80	Houston	82*	—	38.3	.502	.000	.719	14.5	**1.8**	1.0	1.3	25.8
1980–81	Houston	80	—	40.6	.522	.333	.757	14.8*	**1.8**	1.0	1.9	27.8
1981–82	Houston	81	**81**	**42.0***	.519	.000	.762	14.7*	**1.8**	.9	1.5	**31.1**
1982–83†	Philadelphia	78	78	37.5	.501	.000	.761	15.3*	1.3	**1.1**	2.0	24.5
1983–84	Philadelphia	71	71	36.8	.483	.000	.750	13.4*	1.4	1.0	1.5	22.7
1984–85	Philadelphia	79	79	37.4	.469	.000	.815	13.1*	1.6	.8	1.6	24.6
1985–86	Philadelphia	74	74	36.6	.458	.000	.787	11.8	1.2	.9	1.0	23.8
1986–87	Washington	73	70	34.1	.454	.000	.824	11.3	1.6	.8	1.3	24.1
1987–88	Washington	79	78	34.1	.487	.286	.788	11.2	1.4	.7	.9	20.3
1988–89	Atlanta	81	80	35.5	.491	.000	.789	11.8	1.4	1.0	1.2	20.2
1989–90	Atlanta	81	**81**	33.8	.480	.111	.781	10.0	1.6	.6	1.0	18.9
1990–91	Atlanta	82*	15	23.3	.468	.000	**.831**	8.1	.8	.4	.9	10.6
1991–92	Milwaukee	82	77	30.6	.474	**.375**	.786	9.1	1.1	.9	.8	15.6
1992–93	Milwaukee	11	0	9.5	.310	—	.774	4.2	.6	.1	.7	4.5
1993–94	Philadelphia	55	0	11.2	.440	.000	.769	4.1	.6	.2	.3	5.3
1994–95	San Antonio	17	0	8.8	.371	.500	.688	2.7	.4	.1	.2	2.9
Career		1,455	784	34.0	.495	.096	.760	12.3	1.3	.8	1.3	20.3
All-Star		12	8	24.3	.455	—	.583	9.8	1.3	.8	.6	11.2

=== Playoffs ===
Year	Team	GP	GS	MPG	FG%	3P%	FT%	RPG	APG	SPG	BPG	PPG
1975	Utah (ABA)	6	—	39.2	**.638**	—	.667	17.5	1.5	.0	1.5	22.7
1977	Houston	12	—	43.2	.500	—	.692	16.9	.6	1.1	1.8	18.8
1979	Houston	2	—	39.0	.528	—	.722	**20.5**	1.0	.5	**4.0**	24.5
1980	Houston	7	—	39.3	.536	.000	.767	13.9	1.0	.6	2.3	25.9
1981	Houston	**21**	—	**45.5**	.479	.000	.712	14.5	1.7	.6	1.6	**26.8**
1982	Houston	3	—	45.3	.433	—	.933	17.0	**3.3**	.7	.7	24.0
1983†	Philadelphia	13	—	40.3	.536	.000	.717	15.8	1.5	**1.5**	1.9	26.0
1984	Philadelphia	5	—	42.4	.458	—	**.969**	13.8	1.4	.6	2.2	21.4
1985	Philadelphia	13	**13**	38.8	.425	.000	.796	10.6	1.8	1.3	1.7	20.2
1987	Washington	3	3	38.0	.447	—	.952	12.7	1.7	.0	1.0	20.7
1988	Washington	5	5	39.6	.462	.000	.825	11.2	1.4	.6	.8	18.6
1989	Atlanta	5	5	39.4	.500	**1.000**	.784	12.0	1.8	1.4	.8	21.0
1991	Atlanta	5	0	16.8	.200	—	.929	6.2	.6	.4	.2	4.2
Career		100	26	40.3	.487	.143	.756	14.0	1.5	.8	1.6	22.1

== See also ==
- List of NBA career scoring leaders
- List of NBA career rebounding leaders
- List of NBA career blocks leaders
- List of NBA career turnovers leaders
- List of NBA career free throw scoring leaders
- List of NBA seasons played leaders
- List of NBA career games played leaders
- List of NBA career minutes played leaders
- List of NBA annual rebounding leaders
- List of NBA annual minutes leaders
- List of NBA single-season rebounding leaders
- List of NBA single-game rebounding leaders
