= List of NBA career turnovers leaders =

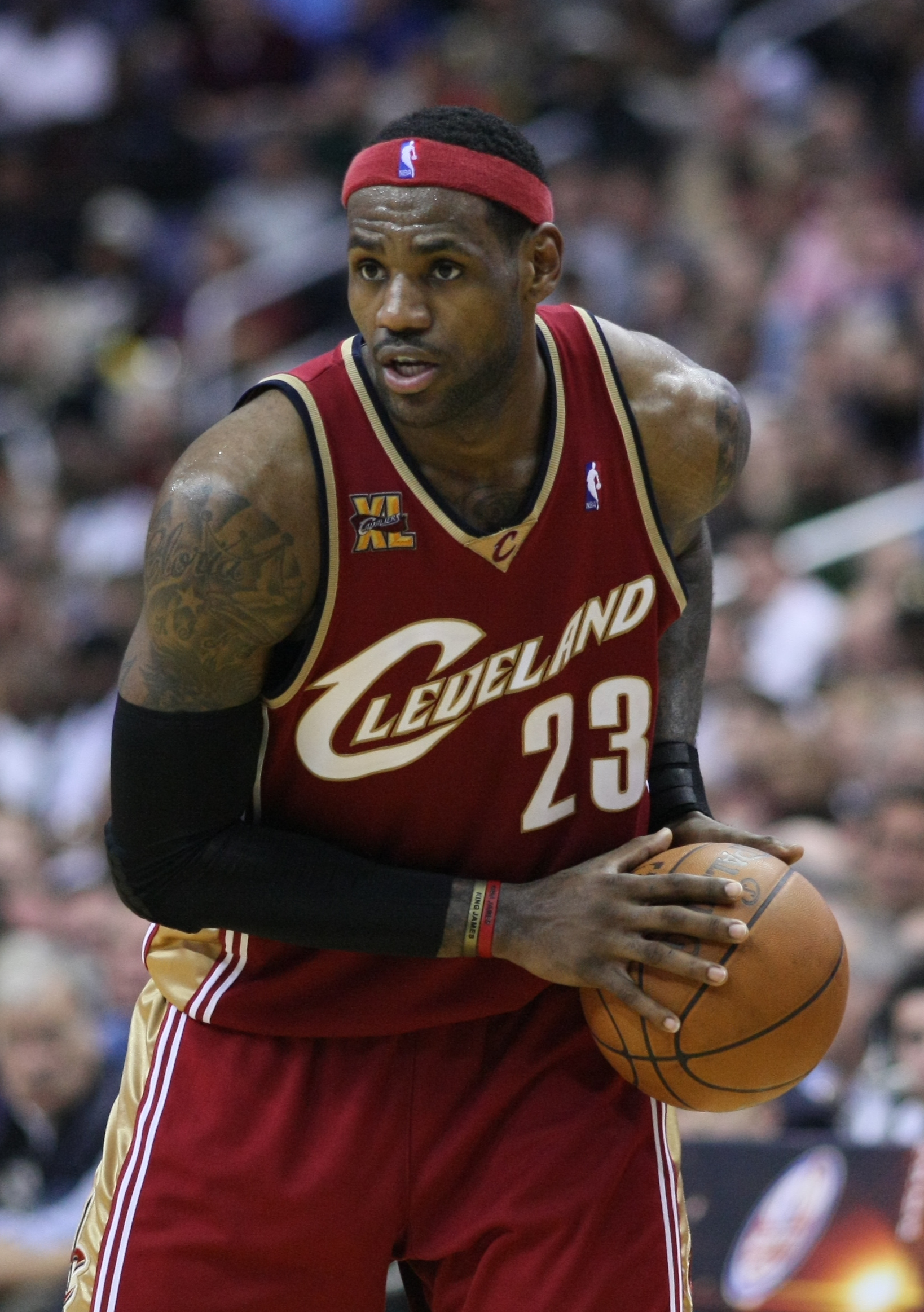
LeBron James has the most turnovers in NBA history.

This article provides two lists:

A list of National Basketball Association players by total career regular season turnovers recorded. (Note: The National Basketball Association did not record turnover statistics until the 1977–78 NBA season.)

A progressive list of turnover leaders showing how the record increased through the years.

== Turnovers leaders ==
This is a list of National Basketball Association players by total career regular season turnovers recorded.

Statistics accurate as of November 18, 2026.

^	Active NBA player
*	Inducted into the Naismith Memorial Basketball Hall of Fame
†	Not yet eligible for Hall of Fame consideration (Note: A player is not eligible for induction into the Naismith Memorial Basketball Hall of Fame until he has been fully retired for two calendar years.)

Rank	Player	Pos	Team(s) played for (years) (Note: American Basketball Association (ABA) teams other than those admitted into the NBA in 1976 are not included; each year is linked to an article about that particular NBA season.)	Total turnovers	Games played	Turnovers per game average (Note: Average is rounded to the nearest hundredth and its calculation does not include games played in seasons before turnovers were officially recorded.)
1	LeBron James^	SF	Cleveland Cavaliers (2003–2010, 2014–2018); Miami Heat (2010–2014); Los Angeles Lakers (2018–2026); Philadelphia 76ers (2026–present)	5,680	1,634	3.48
2	Russell Westbrook^{†}	PG	Oklahoma City Thunder (2008–2019); Houston Rockets (2019–2020); Washington Wizards (2020–2021); Los Angeles Lakers (2021–2023); Los Angeles Clippers (2023–2024); Denver Nuggets (2024–2025); Sacramento Kings (2025–2026)	5,038	1,301	3.87
3	James Harden^	SG/PG	Oklahoma City Thunder (2009–2012); Houston Rockets (2012–2021); Brooklyn Nets (2021–2022); Philadelphia 76ers (2022–2023); Los Angeles Clippers (2023–2026); Cleveland Cavaliers (2026–present)	4,547	1,236	3.68
4	Karl Malone*	PF	Utah Jazz (1985–2003); Los Angeles Lakers (2003–2004)	4,524	1,476	3.07
5	John Stockton*	PG	Utah Jazz (1984–2003)	4,244	1,504	2.82
6	Kobe Bryant*	SG	Los Angeles Lakers (1996–2016)	4,010	1,346	2.98
7	Jason Kidd*	PG	Dallas Mavericks (1994–1996, 2008–2012); Phoenix Suns (1996–2001); New Jersey Nets (2001–2008); New York Knicks (2012–2013)	4,003	1,391	2.88
8	Kevin Durant^	SF/PF	Seattle SuperSonics/Oklahoma City Thunder (2007–2016); Golden State Warriors (2016–2019); Brooklyn Nets (2019–2023); Phoenix Suns (2023–2025); Houston Rockets (2025–present)	3,846	1,217	3.16
9	Moses Malone*	C	Buffalo Braves (1976) (Note: Turnovers were not yet recorded during the player's tenure with this team and season(s).); Houston Rockets (1976–1977); Houston Rockets (1977–1982); Philadelphia 76ers (1982–1986, 1993–1994); Washington Bullets (1986–1988); Atlanta Hawks (1988–1991); Milwaukee Bucks (1991–1993); San Antonio Spurs (1994–1995)	3,804	1,247	3.05
10	Isiah Thomas*	PG	Detroit Pistons (1981–1994)	3,682	979	3.76
11	Hakeem Olajuwon*	C	Houston Rockets (1984–2001); Toronto Raptors (2001–2002)	3,667	1,238	2.96
12	Patrick Ewing*	C	New York Knicks (1985–2000); Seattle SuperSonics (2000–2001); Orlando Magic (2001–2002)	3,537	1,183	2.99
13	Paul Pierce*	SF	Boston Celtics (1998–2013); Brooklyn Nets (2013–2014); Washington Wizards (2014–2015); Los Angeles Clippers (2015–2017)	3,532	1,343	2.63
14	Magic Johnson*	PG	Los Angeles Lakers (1979–1991, 1996)	3,506	906	3.87
15	Reggie Theus	PG/SG	Chicago Bulls (1978–1984); Kansas City/Sacramento Kings (1984–1988); Atlanta Hawks (1988–1989); Orlando Magic (1989–1990); New Jersey Nets (1990–1991)	3,493	1,026	3.40
16	Steve Nash*	PG	Phoenix Suns (1996–1998, 2004–2012); Dallas Mavericks (1998–2004); Los Angeles Lakers (2012–2015)	3,478	1,217	2.86
17	Tim Duncan*	PF/C	San Antonio Spurs (1997–2016)	3,381	1,392	2.43
18	Charles Barkley*	PF	Philadelphia 76ers (1984–1992); Phoenix Suns (1992–1996); Houston Rockets (1996–2000)	3,376	1,073	3.15
19	Dwyane Wade*	SG	Miami Heat (2003–2016, 2018–2019); Chicago Bulls (2016–2017); Cleveland Cavaliers (2017–2018)	3,326	1,054	3.16
20	Stephen Curry^	PG	Golden State Warriors (2009–present)	3,325	1,079	3.08
21	Shaquille O'Neal*	C	Orlando Magic (1992–1996); Los Angeles Lakers (1996–2004); Miami Heat (2004–2008); Phoenix Suns (2008–2009); Cleveland Cavaliers (2009–2010); Boston Celtics (2010–2011)	3,310	1,207	2.74
22	Dwight Howard*	C	Orlando Magic (2004–2012); Los Angeles Lakers (2012–2013, 2019–2020, 2021–2022); Houston Rockets (2013–2016); Atlanta Hawks (2016–2017); Charlotte Hornets (2017–2018); Washington Wizards (2018–2019); Philadelphia 76ers (2020–2021)	3,302	1,242	2.66
23	Allen Iverson*	SG/PG	Philadelphia 76ers (1996–2006, 2009–2010); Denver Nuggets (2006–2008); Detroit Pistons (2008–2009); Memphis Grizzlies (2009)	3,262	914	3.57
24	Scottie Pippen*	SF	Chicago Bulls (1987–1998); Houston Rockets (1999); Portland Trail Blazers (1999–2003); Chicago Bulls (2003–2004)	3,257	1,178	2.76
25	Robert Parish*	C	Golden State Warriors (1976–1977); Golden State Warriors (1977–1980); Boston Celtics (1980–1994); Charlotte Hornets (1994–1996); Chicago Bulls (1996–1997)	3,183	1,534	2.07
26	Kevin Garnett*	PF	Minnesota Timberwolves (1995–2007, 2015–2016); Boston Celtics (2007–2013); Brooklyn Nets (2013–2015)	3,179	1,462	2.17
27	Mark Jackson	PG	New York Knicks (1987–1992); Los Angeles Clippers (1992–1994); Indiana Pacers (1994–1996, 1997–2000); Denver Nuggets (1996–1997); Toronto Raptors (2000–2001); New York Knicks (2001–2002); Utah Jazz (2002–2003); Houston Rockets (2004)	3,155	1,296	2.43
28	Andre Miller	PG	Cleveland Cavaliers (1999–2002); Los Angeles Clippers (2002–2003); Denver Nuggets (2003–2006, 2011–2014); Philadelphia 76ers (2006–2009); Portland Trail Blazers (2009–2011); Washington Wizards (2014–2015); Sacramento Kings (2015); Minnesota Timberwolves (2015–2016); San Antonio Spurs (2016)	3,121	1,304	2.39
29	Chris Paul^{†}	PG	New Orleans Hornets (2005–2011); Los Angeles Clippers (2011–2017, 2025–2026); Houston Rockets (2017–2019); Oklahoma City Thunder (2019–2020); Phoenix Suns (2020–2023); Golden State Warriors (2023–2024); San Antonio Spurs (2024–2025)	3,109	1,370	2.27
30	Carmelo Anthony*	SF	Denver Nuggets (2003–2011); New York Knicks (2011–2017); Oklahoma City Thunder (2017–2018); Houston Rockets (2018–2019); Portland Trail Blazers (2019–2021); Los Angeles Lakers (2021–2022)	3,052	1,260	2.42
31	Gary Payton*	PG	Seattle SuperSonics (1990–2003); Milwaukee Bucks (2003); Los Angeles Lakers (2003–2004); Boston Celtics (2004–2005); Miami Heat (2005–2007)	3,030	1,335	2.27
32	Clyde Drexler*	SG	Portland Trail Blazers (1983–1995); Houston Rockets (1995–1998)	2,977	1,086	2.74
33	Michael Jordan*	SG	Chicago Bulls (1984–1993, 1995–1998); Washington Wizards (2001–2003)	2,924	1,072	2.73
34	Tony Parker*	PG	San Antonio Spurs (2001–2018); Charlotte Hornets (2018–2019)	2,865	1,254	2.29
35	Rod Strickland	PG	New York Knicks (1988–1990); San Antonio Spurs (1990–1992); Portland Trail Blazers (1992–1996, 2001); Washington Bullets/Wizards (1996–2001); Miami Heat (2001–2002); Minnesota Timberwolves (2002–2003); Orlando Magic (2003–2004); Toronto Raptors (2004); Houston Rockets (2005)	2,862	1,094	2.62
36	Jrue Holiday^	PG	Philadelphia 76ers (2009–2013); New Orleans Pelicans (2013–2020); Milwaukee Bucks (2020–2023); Boston Celtics (2023–2025); Portland Trail Blazers (2025–present)	2,844	1,104	2.58
37	Alex English*	SF/PF	Milwaukee Bucks (1976–1977); Milwaukee Bucks (1977–1978); Indiana Pacers (1978–1980); Denver Nuggets (1980–1990); Dallas Mavericks (1990–1991)	2,821	1,133	2.49
38	Larry Bird*	SF/PF	Boston Celtics (1979–1992)	2,816	897	3.14
39	Bernard King*	SF	New Jersey Nets (1977–1979, 1993); Utah Jazz (1979–1980); Golden State Warriors (1980–1982); New York Knicks (1982–1987); Washington Bullets (1987–1993)	2,791	874	3.19
40	Charles Oakley	PF	Chicago Bulls (1985–1988, 2001–2002); New York Knicks (1988–1998); Toronto Raptors (1998–2001); Washington Wizards (2002–2003); Houston Rockets (2004)	2,785	1,282	2.17
41	Buck Williams	PF	New Jersey Nets (1981–1989); Portland Trail Blazers (1989–1996); New York Knicks (1996–1998)	2,784	1,307	2.13
42	Otis Thorpe	PF/C	Kansas City/Sacramento Kings (1984–1988); Houston Rockets (1988–1995); Portland Trail Blazers (1995); Detroit Pistons (1995–1997); Vancouver Grizzlies (1997–1998); Sacramento Kings (1998); Washington Wizards (1998–1999); Miami Heat (1999–2000); Charlotte Hornets (2000–2001)	2,774	1,257	2.21
43	Shawn Kemp	PF/C	Seattle SuperSonics (1989–1997); Cleveland Cavaliers (1997–2000); Portland Trail Blazers (2000–2002); Orlando Magic (2002–2003)	2,766	1,051	2.63
44	Giannis Antetokounmpo^	PF	Milwaukee Bucks (2013–2026); Miami Heat (2026–present)	2,748	910	3.02
45	Ray Allen*	SG	Milwaukee Bucks (1996–2003); Seattle SuperSonics (2003–2007); Boston Celtics (2007–2012); Miami Heat (2012–2014)	2,709	1,300	2.08
46	Dominique Wilkins*	SF	Atlanta Hawks (1982–1994); Los Angeles Clippers (1994); Boston Celtics (1994–1995); San Antonio Spurs (1996–1997); Orlando Magic (1999)	2,669	1,074	2.49
47	Terry Porter	PG/SG	Portland Trail Blazers (1985–1995); Minnesota Timberwolves (1995–1998); Miami Heat (1999); San Antonio Spurs (1999–2002)	2,666	1,274	2.09
48	Jerry Stackhouse	SG	Philadelphia 76ers (1995–1997); Detroit Pistons (1997–2002); Washington Wizards (2002–2004); Dallas Mavericks (2004–2009); Milwaukee Bucks (2010); Miami Heat (2010); Atlanta Hawks (2011–2012); Brooklyn Nets (2012–2013)	2,641	970	2.72
49	Pau Gasol*	PF/C	Memphis Grizzlies (2001–2008); Los Angeles Lakers (2008–2014); Chicago Bulls (2014–2016); San Antonio Spurs (2016–2019); Milwaukee Bucks (2019)	2,638	1,226	2.15
50	Kyle Lowry^{†}	PG	Memphis Grizzlies (2006–2009); Houston Rockets (2009–2012); Toronto Raptors (2012–2021); Miami Heat (2021–2024); Philadelphia 76ers (2024–2026)	2,632	1,186	2.22

== Progressive list of turnovers leaders ==
This is a progressive list of turnovers leaders showing how the record increased through the years.

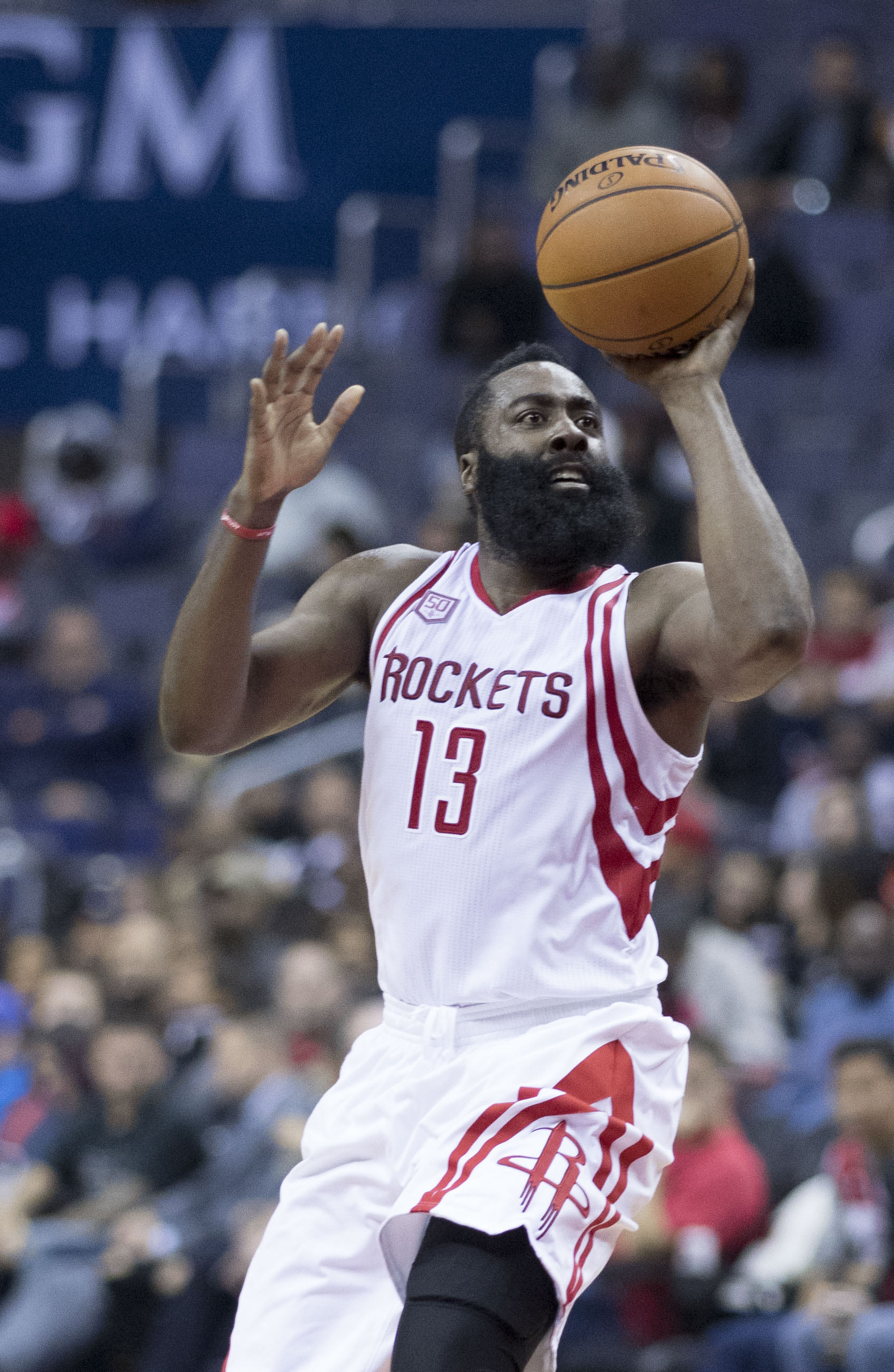
James Harden has the most turnovers in a single season with 464.

Statistics accurate as of November 18, 2026.

^	Active NBA player
*	Inducted into the Naismith Memorial Basketball Hall of Fame
†	Not yet eligible for Hall of Fame consideration

Team AbbreviationsTeam listed is the one player was on when he established the record.
ATL	Atlanta Hawks	HOU	Houston Rockets	NYK	New York Knicks	UTA	Utah Jazz
BOS	Boston Celtics	IND	Indiana Pacers	OKC	Oklahoma City Thunder	VAN	Vancouver Grizzlies
CHI	Chicago Bulls	KCK	Kansas City Kings	ORL	Orlando Magic	WAS	Washington Wizards
CLE	Cleveland Cavaliers	LAL	Los Angeles Lakers	PHI	Philadelphia 76ers	WSB	Washington Bullets
DAL	Dallas Mavericks	MIA	Miami Heat	PHX	Phoenix Suns		
DEN	Denver Nuggets	MIL	Milwaukee Bucks	POR	Portland Trail Blazers		
DET	Detroit Pistons	NJN	New Jersey Nets	SAS	San Antonio Spurs		

NBA progressive leaders and records for turnovers for every season
Season	Year-by-year leader	TOV	Active player leader	TOV	Career record	TOV	Single-season record	TOV	Season
1977–78	Artis Gilmore*CHI	366	Artis Gilmore*CHI	366	Artis Gilmore*CHI	366	Artis Gilmore*CHI	366	1977–78
1978–79	George McGinnis*DEN	346	Kevin PorterDET	697	Kevin PorterDET	697	Artis Gilmore*CHI	366	1978–79
1979–80	Micheal Ray RichardsonNYK	359	George McGinnis*; DEN 1979–80; IND 1980–81	939	George McGinnis*; DEN 1979–80; IND 1980–81	939	Artis Gilmore*CHI	366	1979–80
1980–81	Moses Malone*HOU	308	George McGinnis*; DEN 1979–80; IND 1980–81	1,160	George McGinnis*; DEN 1979–80; IND 1980–81	1,160	Artis Gilmore*CHI	366	1980–81
1981–82	Isiah Thomas*DET; Adrian Dantley*UTA	299	Moses Malone*; HOU 1981–82; PHI 1982–86; WSB 1986–88; ATL 1988–91; MIL 1991–93; PHI 1993–94; SAS 1994–95	1,448	Moses Malone*; HOU 1981–82; PHI 1982–86; WSB 1986–88; ATL 1988–91; MIL 1991–93; PHI 1993–94; SAS 1994–95	1,448	Artis Gilmore*CHI	366	1981–82
1982–83	Ray WilliamsKCK	335	Moses Malone*; HOU 1981–82; PHI 1982–86; WSB 1986–88; ATL 1988–91; MIL 1991–93; PHI 1993–94; SAS 1994–95	1,712	Moses Malone*; HOU 1981–82; PHI 1982–86; WSB 1986–88; ATL 1988–91; MIL 1991–93; PHI 1993–94; SAS 1994–95	1,712	Artis Gilmore*CHI	366	1982–83
1983–84	Jeff RulandWSB	342	Moses Malone*; HOU 1981–82; PHI 1982–86; WSB 1986–88; ATL 1988–91; MIL 1991–93; PHI 1993–94; SAS 1994–95	1,962	Moses Malone*; HOU 1981–82; PHI 1982–86; WSB 1986–88; ATL 1988–91; MIL 1991–93; PHI 1993–94; SAS 1994–95	1,962	Artis Gilmore*CHI	366	1983–84
1984–85	Ralph Sampson*HOU	326	Moses Malone*; HOU 1981–82; PHI 1982–86; WSB 1986–88; ATL 1988–91; MIL 1991–93; PHI 1993–94; SAS 1994–95	2,248	Moses Malone*; HOU 1981–82; PHI 1982–86; WSB 1986–88; ATL 1988–91; MIL 1991–93; PHI 1993–94; SAS 1994–95	2,248	Artis Gilmore*CHI	366	1984–85
1985–86	Charles Barkley*PHI	350	Moses Malone*; HOU 1981–82; PHI 1982–86; WSB 1986–88; ATL 1988–91; MIL 1991–93; PHI 1993–94; SAS 1994–95	2,509	Moses Malone*; HOU 1981–82; PHI 1982–86; WSB 1986–88; ATL 1988–91; MIL 1991–93; PHI 1993–94; SAS 1994–95	2,509	Artis Gilmore*CHI	366	1985–86
1986–87	Ron HarperCLE	345	Moses Malone*; HOU 1981–82; PHI 1982–86; WSB 1986–88; ATL 1988–91; MIL 1991–93; PHI 1993–94; SAS 1994–95	2,711	Moses Malone*; HOU 1981–82; PHI 1982–86; WSB 1986–88; ATL 1988–91; MIL 1991–93; PHI 1993–94; SAS 1994–95	2,711	Artis Gilmore*CHI	366	1986–87
1987–88	Karl Malone*UTA	325	Moses Malone*; HOU 1981–82; PHI 1982–86; WSB 1986–88; ATL 1988–91; MIL 1991–93; PHI 1993–94; SAS 1994–95	2,960	Moses Malone*; HOU 1981–82; PHI 1982–86; WSB 1986–88; ATL 1988–91; MIL 1991–93; PHI 1993–94; SAS 1994–95	2,960	Artis Gilmore*CHI	366	1987–88
1988–89	Kevin JohnsonPHX	322	Moses Malone*; HOU 1981–82; PHI 1982–86; WSB 1986–88; ATL 1988–91; MIL 1991–93; PHI 1993–94; SAS 1994–95	3,205	Moses Malone*; HOU 1981–82; PHI 1982–86; WSB 1986–88; ATL 1988–91; MIL 1991–93; PHI 1993–94; SAS 1994–95	3,205	Artis Gilmore*CHI	366	1988–89
1989–90	Isiah Thomas*DET	322	Moses Malone*; HOU 1981–82; PHI 1982–86; WSB 1986–88; ATL 1988–91; MIL 1991–93; PHI 1993–94; SAS 1994–95	3,437	Moses Malone*; HOU 1981–82; PHI 1982–86; WSB 1986–88; ATL 1988–91; MIL 1991–93; PHI 1993–94; SAS 1994–95	3,437	Artis Gilmore*CHI	366	1989–90
1990–91	Magic Johnson*LAL	314	Moses Malone*; HOU 1981–82; PHI 1982–86; WSB 1986–88; ATL 1988–91; MIL 1991–93; PHI 1993–94; SAS 1994–95	3,574	Moses Malone*; HOU 1981–82; PHI 1982–86; WSB 1986–88; ATL 1988–91; MIL 1991–93; PHI 1993–94; SAS 1994–95	3,574	Artis Gilmore*CHI	366	1990–91
1991–92	John Stockton*UTA	286	Moses Malone*; HOU 1981–82; PHI 1982–86; WSB 1986–88; ATL 1988–91; MIL 1991–93; PHI 1993–94; SAS 1994–95	3,724	Moses Malone*; HOU 1981–82; PHI 1982–86; WSB 1986–88; ATL 1988–91; MIL 1991–93; PHI 1993–94; SAS 1994–95	3,724	Artis Gilmore*CHI	366	1991–92
1992–93	Shaquille O'Neal*ORL	307	Moses Malone*; HOU 1981–82; PHI 1982–86; WSB 1986–88; ATL 1988–91; MIL 1991–93; PHI 1993–94; SAS 1994–95	3,734	Moses Malone*; HOU 1981–82; PHI 1982–86; WSB 1986–88; ATL 1988–91; MIL 1991–93; PHI 1993–94; SAS 1994–95	3,734	Artis Gilmore*CHI	366	1992–93
1993–94	Jim JacksonDAL	334	Moses Malone*; HOU 1981–82; PHI 1982–86; WSB 1986–88; ATL 1988–91; MIL 1991–93; PHI 1993–94; SAS 1994–95	3,793	Moses Malone*; HOU 1981–82; PHI 1982–86; WSB 1986–88; ATL 1988–91; MIL 1991–93; PHI 1993–94; SAS 1994–95	3,793	Artis Gilmore*CHI	366	1993–94
1994–95	Glenn RobinsonMIL	313	Moses Malone*; HOU 1981–82; PHI 1982–86; WSB 1986–88; ATL 1988–91; MIL 1991–93; PHI 1993–94; SAS 1994–95	3,804	Moses Malone*; HOU 1981–82; PHI 1982–86; WSB 1986–88; ATL 1988–91; MIL 1991–93; PHI 1993–94; SAS 1994–95	3,804	Artis Gilmore*CHI	366	1994–95
1995–96	Jason Kidd*DAL	328	Magic Johnson*LAL	3,506	Moses Malone*; HOU 1981–82; PHI 1982–86; WSB 1986–88; ATL 1988–91; MIL 1991–93; PHI 1993–94; SAS 1994–95	3,804	Artis Gilmore*CHI	366	1995–96
1996–97	Allen Iverson*PHI	337	John Stockton*UTA	3,201	Moses Malone*; HOU 1981–82; PHI 1982–86; WSB 1986–88; ATL 1988–91; MIL 1991–93; PHI 1993–94; SAS 1994–95	3,804	Artis Gilmore*CHI	366	1996–97
1997–98	Antoine WalkerBOS	292	John Stockton*UTA	3,362	Moses Malone*; HOU 1981–82; PHI 1982–86; WSB 1986–88; ATL 1988–91; MIL 1991–93; PHI 1993–94; SAS 1994–95	3,804	Artis Gilmore*CHI	366	1997–98
1998–99	Shareef Abdur-RahimVAN	186	Karl Malone*; UTA 1998–03; LAL 2003–04	3,473	Moses Malone*; HOU 1981–82; PHI 1982–86; WSB 1986–88; ATL 1988–91; MIL 1991–93; PHI 1993–94; SAS 1994–95	3,804	Artis Gilmore*CHI	366	1998–99
1999–00	Jerry StackhouseDET	311	Karl Malone*; UTA 1998–03; LAL 2003–04	3,704	Moses Malone*; HOU 1981–82; PHI 1982–86; WSB 1986–88; ATL 1988–91; MIL 1991–93; PHI 1993–94; SAS 1994–95	3,804	Artis Gilmore*CHI	366	1999–00
2000–01	Jerry StackhouseDET	326	Karl Malone*; UTA 1998–03; LAL 2003–04	3,948	Karl Malone*; UTA 2000–03; LAL 2003–04	3,948	Artis Gilmore*CHI	366	2000–01
2001–02	Jason Kidd*NJN	286	Karl Malone*; UTA 1998–03; LAL 2003–04	4,211	Karl Malone*; UTA 2000–03; LAL 2003–04	4,211	Artis Gilmore*CHI	366	2001–02
2002–03	Steve FrancisHOU	299	Karl Malone*; UTA 1998–03; LAL 2003–04	4,421	Karl Malone*; UTA 2000–03; LAL 2003–04	4,421	Artis Gilmore*CHI	366	2002–03
2003–04	Paul Pierce*BOS	303	Karl Malone*; UTA 1998–03; LAL 2003–04	4,524	Karl Malone*; UTA 2000–03; LAL 2003–04	4,524	Artis Gilmore*CHI	366	2003–04
2004–05	Allen Iverson*PHI	344	Gary Payton*BOS Rod StricklandHOU	2,862	Karl Malone*; UTA 2000–03; LAL 2003–04	4,524	Artis Gilmore*CHI	366	2004–05
2005–06	Gilbert ArenasWAS	297	Gary Payton*MIA	2,964	Karl Malone*; UTA 2000–03; LAL 2003–04	4,524	Artis Gilmore*CHI	366	2005–06
2006–07	Dwight Howard*ORL	317	Gary Payton*MIA	3,030	Karl Malone*; UTA 2000–03; LAL 2003–04	4,524	Artis Gilmore*CHI	366	2006–07
2007–08	Steve Nash*PHX	295	Jason Kidd*; NJN 2007–08; DAL 2008–12; NYK 2012–13	3,277	Karl Malone*; UTA 2000–03; LAL 2003–04	4,524	Artis Gilmore*CHI	366	2007–08
2008–09	Russell Westbrook^{†}OKC	274	Jason Kidd*; NJN 2007–08; DAL 2008–12; NYK 2012–13	3,462	Karl Malone*; UTA 2000–03; LAL 2003–04	4,524	Artis Gilmore*CHI	366	2008–09
2009–10	Steve Nash*PHX	295	Jason Kidd*; NJN 2007–08; DAL 2008–12; NYK 2012–13	3,657	Karl Malone*; UTA 2000–03; LAL 2003–04	4,524	Artis Gilmore*CHI	366	2009–10
2010–11	Russell Westbrook^{†}OKC	316	Jason Kidd*; NJN 2007–08; DAL 2008–12; NYK 2012–13	3,836	Karl Malone*; UTA 2000–03; LAL 2003–04	4,524	Artis Gilmore*CHI	366	2010–11
2011–12	John WallWAS	255	Jason Kidd*; NJN 2007–08; DAL 2008–12; NYK 2012–13	3,927	Karl Malone*; UTA 2000–03; LAL 2003–04	4,524	Artis Gilmore*CHI	366	2011–12
2012–13	James Harden^HOU	295	Jason Kidd*; NJN 2007–08; DAL 2008–12; NYK 2012–13	4,003	Karl Malone*; UTA 2000–03; LAL 2003–04	4,524	Artis Gilmore*CHI	366	2012–13
2013–14	John WallWAS	295	Kobe Bryant*LAL	3,753	Karl Malone*; UTA 2000–03; LAL 2003–04	4,524	Artis Gilmore*CHI	366	2013–14
2014–15	James Harden^HOU	321	Kobe Bryant*LAL	3,881	Karl Malone*; UTA 2000–03; LAL 2003–04	4,524	Artis Gilmore*CHI	366	2014–15
2015–16	James Harden^HOU	374	Kobe Bryant*LAL	4,010	Karl Malone*; UTA 2000–03; LAL 2003–04	4,524	James Harden^HOU	374	2015–16
2016–17	James Harden^HOU	464	LeBron James^ CLE 2016–18; LAL 2018–26; PHI 2026–	3,619	Karl Malone*; UTA 2000–03; LAL 2003–04	4,524	James Harden^HOU	464	2016–17
2017–18	Russell Westbrook^{†}OKC	381	LeBron James^ CLE 2016–18; LAL 2018–26; PHI 2026–	3,966	Karl Malone*; UTA 2000–03; LAL 2003–04	4,524	James Harden^HOU	464	2017–18
2018–19	James Harden^HOU	387	LeBron James^ CLE 2016–18; LAL 2018–26; PHI 2026–	4,163	Karl Malone*; UTA 2000–03; LAL 2003–04	4,524	James Harden^HOU	464	2018–19
2019–20	James Harden^HOU	308	LeBron James^ CLE 2016–18; LAL 2018–26; PHI 2026–	4,424	Karl Malone*; UTA 2000–03; LAL 2003–04	4,524	James Harden^HOU	464	2019–20
2020–21	Russell Westbrook^{†}WAS	312	LeBron James^ CLE 2016–18; LAL 2018–26; PHI 2026–	4,592	LeBron James^ LAL 2020–26; PHI 2026–	4,592	James Harden^HOU	464	2020–21
2021–22	Trae Young^ATL	303	LeBron James^ CLE 2016–18; LAL 2018–26; PHI 2026–	4,788	LeBron James^ LAL 2020–26; PHI 2026–	4,788	James Harden^HOU	464	2021–22
2022–23	Trae Young^ATL	300	LeBron James^ CLE 2016–18; LAL 2018–26; PHI 2026–	4,966	LeBron James^ LAL 2020–26; PHI 2026–	4,966	James Harden^HOU	464	2022–23
2023–24	Luka Dončić^DAL	282	LeBron James^ CLE 2016–18; LAL 2018–26; PHI 2026–	5,211	LeBron James^ LAL 2020–26; PHI 2026–	5,211	James Harden^HOU	464	2023–24
2024–25	Trae Young^ATL	355	LeBron James^ CLE 2016–18; LAL 2018–26; PHI 2026–	5,471	LeBron James^ LAL 2020–26; PHI 2026–	5,471	James Harden^HOU	464	2024–25
2025–26	Jaylen Brown^BOS	259	LeBron James^ CLE 2016–18; LAL 2018–26; PHI 2026–	5,650	LeBron James^ LAL 2020–26; PHI 2026–	5,650	James Harden^HOU	464	2025–26
2026–27	Luka Dončić^LAL	71	LeBron James^ CLE 2016–18; LAL 2018–26; PHI 2026–	5,680	LeBron James^ LAL 2020–26; PHI 2026–	5,680	James Harden^HOU	464	2026–27
Season	Year-by-year leader	TOV	Active player leader	TOV	Career record	TOV	Single-season record	TOV	Season

== See also ==
- Basketball statistics
- NBA regular season records
