= 1974–75 Utah Stars season =

- Head coach: Bucky Buckwalter (24-32); Tom Nissalke (14-14)
- Arena: Salt Palace

Results
- Record: 38–46 (.452)
- Place: Division: 4th (ABA)
- Playoff finish: Lost in ABA Semifinals
- Radio: KALL

The 1974–75 Utah Stars season was the fifth season of the franchise in Utah (and eighth overall season when including their few seasons out in nearby California as the Anaheim Amigos and Los Angeles Stars) in the American Basketball Association (ABA). Despite declining from the previous season for the 3rd straight year, the Stars went into the playoffs once again, finishing seven games over San Diego for 4th place. In the Semifinals, they lost to the Denver Nuggets in 6 games. As it turned out, this was their final playoff appearance, as the team folded midway through the next season. Unbeknownst to fans of the Stars at the time, part of the reason as to why the hit franchise would suddenly fold with little to no warning to fans near the end of the 1975 year would relate to Stars owner Bill Daniels focusing primarily on becoming the governor of nearby Colorado during the 1974 year, losing his spot for the Republican National Committee to Governor John Vanderhoof, who in turn would lose his following election to Democrat candidate Richard Lamm. While Daniels would try to help save the Stars by selling the franchise to multiple different incumbent owners, to the point of even attempting a merger with the Spirits of St. Louis as a last resort measure to save the Utah franchise specifically since the Spirits were also dealing with serious financial troubles near the end of 1975 and would have likely folded operations had the merger gone through as the Stars had planned for their ends, every attempt would ultimately go in vain for Daniels and the franchise by December 1975.

Before the season officially began, the Stars drafted a 19-year old Moses Malone straight out of Petersburg High School in Petersburg, Virginia as the 22nd pick from the third round of the 1974 ABA draft (with them acquiring the pick by a trade with the Virginia Squires through a 1973 deal involving Cincy Powell) and later signing him to a four-year contract worth $565,000 (with additional bonuses in mind) after dealing with months-long disputes regarding his professional/collegiate status at the time since he was initially slated to go to the University of Maryland at the time. However, the ABA allowed the Stars to select Malone in spite of initial concerns due to the league noticing his poor home life at the time and expressing genuine concern for his status as a player since he only barely was considered eligible for attending the University of Maryland at the time and his family had received envelopes involving hundreds of dollars for universities to persuade Malone to attend their college or university specifically (which would have raised concerns within the NCAA had Malone stayed in the collegiate system). Malone would later end up becoming the second-leading scorer in ABA/NBA history when combining overall scoring totals in both leagues played behind only Julius Erving and earn his spot in the Naismith Basketball Hall of Fame, as well as result in both the ABA and the NBA allowing high school seniors to enter the following year's respective drafts not long afterward.

== ABA Draft ==
| Round | Pick | Player | Position(s) | Nationality | School |
|---|---|---|---|---|---|
| 1 | 10 | Joe C. Meriweather | PF/C | United States | Southern Illinois |
| 2 | 20 | Len Kosmalski | C | United States | Tennessee |
| 3 | 22 | Moses Malone | C | United States | Petersburg High School (Petersburg, Virginia) |
| 3 | 25 | Aaron Jones | PF | United States | Duquesne |
| 3 | 27 | Tom Barker | PF/C | United States | College of Southern Idaho |
| 4 | 38 | Sam McCants | G | United States | Oral Roberts |
| 5 | 48 | Steve Brooks | C | United States | Arkansas State |
| 7 | 68 | Ron Lee | PG | United States | Oregon |
| 8 | 78 | Ed Palubinskas | G | Australia | LSU |
| 9 | 88 | Glenn Hansen | SG | United States | LSU |
| 10 | 98 | Mike Westra | F | United States | USC |

Moses Malone would become the first basketball player to not only be selected directly out of high school since Reggie Harding back in 1962 for the NBA, but he'd also become the first high school senior to play directly into a professional basketball league in a modern era of play after the NBA previously forbade the idea back when they were called the Basketball Association of America. This draft listing does not include selections made from the "ABA Draft of NBA Players" done immediately afterward.

=== ABA Draft of NBA Players ===
| Round | Pick | Player | Position(s) | Nationality | College | NBA Team |
|---|---|---|---|---|---|---|
| 1 | 8 | Bob Christian | C | United States | Grambling College | Phoenix Suns |
| 2 | 18 | Geoff Petrie | PG/SG | United States | Princeton | Portland Trail Blazers |
| 3 | 28 | Howard Porter | PF/C | United States | Villanova | Chicago Bulls |
| 4 | 38 | Rudy Tomjanovich | PF | United States | Michigan | Houston Rockets |
| 5 | 48 | Bob McAdoo | C | United States | North Carolina | Buffalo Braves |

The "ABA Draft of NBA Players" that was done on April 17, 1974 happened immediately after the actual ABA Draft done for this season was concluded on that day. None of the five players drafted by the Stars would report to the team this season, with Bob Christian (who previously played in a couple of games for the Dallas Chaparrals and New York Nets (now San Antonio Spurs and Brooklyn Nets respectively) earlier in his career while first being in the ABA) notably retiring from playing professional basketball altogether this season. Following this draft's conclusion, Rudy Tomjanovich and Bob McAdoo would both end up becoming future members of the Naismith Basketball Hall of Fame, though Tomjanovich would primarily enter more for his work as a head coach with the Houston Rockets in particular.

== Roster ==
1974–75 Utah Stars roster
Players

| Pos. | No. | Player | Height | Weight | DOB | From |
|---|---|---|---|---|---|---|
| SG | 24 | Ron Boone | 6 ft 2 in (1.88 m) | 200 lb (91 kg) | September 6, 1946 | Idaho State |
| SF | 35 | Roger Brown | 6 ft 5 in (1.96 m) | 205 lb (93 kg) | May 22, 1942 | George W. Wingate High School |
| C | 32 | Randy Denton | 6 ft 10 in (2.08 m) | 240 lb (109 kg) | February 18, 1949 | Duke |
| SG | 34 | Clyde Dickey | 6 ft 3 in (1.91 m) | 185 lb (84 kg) | December 14, 1951 | Boise State |
| PF | 33 | Jim Eakins | 6 ft 11 in (2.11 m) | 215 lb (98 kg) | May 24, 1946 | BYU |
| C | 25 | Gerald Govan | 6 ft 10 in (2.08 m) | 220 lb (100 kg) | January 2, 1942 | Saint Mary of the Plains College |
| SG | 11 | Wali Jones | 6 ft 2 in (1.88 m) | 180 lb (82 kg) | February 14, 1942 | Villanova |
| C | 22 | Moses Malone | 6 ft 10 in (2.08 m) | 260 lb (118 kg) | March 23, 1955 | Petersburg High |
| SG | 30 | Roy McPipe | 6 ft 3 in (1.91 m) | 205 lb (93 kg) | May 5, 1950 | Montana State Billings |
| SG | 44 | Larry Miller | 6 ft 4 in (1.93 m) | 190 lb (86 kg) | April 4, 1946 | North Carolina |
| PG | 15 | John Roche | 6 ft 3 in (1.91 m) | 170 lb (77 kg) | 1949-09-26 | South Carolina |
| SF | 10 | Bruce Seals | 6 ft 8 in (2.03 m) | 210 lb (95 kg) | June 18, 1953 | Xavier (LA) |
| PG | 20 | Al Smith | 6 ft 1 in (1.85 m) | 185 lb (84 kg) | January 15, 1947 | Bradley |
| SF | 44 | Hank Williams | 6 ft 5 in (1.96 m) | 210 lb (95 kg) | April 28, 1952 | Jacksonville |

Coaches
Head coach
- Joe Mullaney

Legend
- (DP) Unsigned draft pick
- (FA) Free agent
- (S) Suspended
- Injured

Roster

== Final standings ==
=== Western Division ===
| Team | W | L | PCT. | GB |
|---|---|---|---|---|
| Denver Nuggets* | 65 | 19 | .774 | - |
| San Antonio Spurs* | 51 | 33 | .607 | 14 |
| Indiana Pacers* | 45 | 39 | .536 | 20 |
| Utah Stars* | 38 | 46 | .452 | 27 |
| San Diego Conquistadors | 31 | 53 | .369 | 34 |

Asterisk denotes playoff berth

== ABA Playoffs ==
ABA Western Division Semifinals

| Game | Date | Location | Score | Record | Attendance |
| 1 | April 6 | Denver | 107–122 | 0–1 | 7,200 |
| 2 | April 7 | Denver | 120–126 | 0–2 | 7,298 |
| 3 | April 9 | Utah | 122–108 | 1–2 | 5,694 |
| 4 | April 11 | Utah | 132–110 | 2–2 | 9,106 |
| 5 | April 12 | Denver | 119–130 | 2–3 | 7,498 |
| 6 | April 14 | Utah | 113–115 | 2–4 | 8,448 |

Stars lose series, 4–2

This would end up becoming the final ABA Playoff series that the Stars would end up playing in.
