= Bill Higgins (basketball) =

American basketball player

Personal information
- Born: December 15, 1952 (age 73) Toledo, Ohio, U.S.
- Listed height: 6 ft 2 in (1.88 m)
- Listed weight: 180 lb (82 kg)

Career information
- High school: Dunbar (Dayton, Ohio)
- College: Ashland (1971–1974)
- NBA draft: 1975: 7th round, 109th overall pick
- Drafted by: New Orleans Jazz
- Position: Shooting guard
- Number: 14

Career history
- 1974–1975: Virginia Squires
- Stats at Basketball Reference

William Higgins (born December 15, 1952) is an American former professional basketball shooting guard who spent one season in the American Basketball Association (ABA) as a member of the Virginia Squires during the 1974–75 season. Born in Toledo, Ohio, he was drafted from Ashland University by the New Orleans Jazz during the seventh round of the 1975 NBA draft, but he did not play for them.

Higgins played three years of college basketball at Ashland before moving to the ABA after his junior season.
