= Moses Malone Jr. =

American basketball player (born 1979)

Personal information
- Born: December 1, 1979
- Listed height: 6 ft 4 in (1.93 m)
- Listed weight: 210 lb (95 kg)

Career information
- College: Houston (1998–1999); Texas Tech (1999–2000); South Carolina State (2001–2003)
- Position: Shooting guard

Career highlights
- All-MEAC Second Team (2003)

Moses Eugene Malone Jr. (born December 1, 1979) is an American former basketball player. He is the son of three time NBA Most Valuable Player Moses Malone. He played college basketball at the University of Houston, Texas Tech University and South Carolina State University. He averaged 14.9 points as a junior and 15.7 as a senior, helping the Bulldogs to the 2003 NCAA tournament.

== Personal life ==
In 2017, a man was sentenced to 35 years in prison for allegedly orchestrating the beating of Malone Jr. after he had shared a post critical of then Houston Rockets player James Harden on Facebook.
