= 1975 NBA draft =

Basketball player selection

General information
- Sport: Basketball
- Date: May 29, 1975
- Location: New York City, New York

Overview
- 174 total selections in 10 rounds
- League: NBA
- First selection: David Thompson, Atlanta Hawks
- Hall of Famers: 1: G David Thompson

The 1975 NBA draft was the 29th annual draft of the National Basketball Association (NBA). The draft was held on May 29, 1975, before the 1975–76 season. In this draft, 18 NBA teams took turns selecting amateur U.S. college basketball players and other eligible players, including international players. The first two picks in the draft belonged to the teams that finished last in each conference, with the order determined by a coin flip. The Atlanta Hawks, who obtained the New Orleans Jazz first-round pick in a trade, won the coin flip and were awarded the first overall pick, while the Los Angeles Lakers were awarded the second pick. Prior to the draft, the Kansas City-Omaha Kings were renamed to just the Kansas City Kings due to the completion of the Kemper Arena. Before the draft, 18 college underclassmen and 2 high school players were declared eligible for selection under the "hardship" rule, marking the first time since the days of the Basketball Association of America and National Basketball League operating as separate leagues when high schoolers were allowed to play professionally there. These players had applied and gave evidence of financial hardship to the league, which granted them the right to start earning their living by starting their professional careers earlier.

This was the most recent NBA draft to be held in a month other than June until 2020, but the off-season was earlier at the time. The league also hosted a supplementary draft for American Basketball Association (ABA) players who never were never drafted by the NBA teams on December 30, 1975. A player who had finished his four-year college eligibility was eligible for selection. If a player left college early, he would not be eligible for selection until his college class graduated.

== Draft selections and draftee career notes ==
David Thompson from North Carolina State University was selected first overall by the Atlanta Hawks. He was also drafted first overall in the 1975 ABA Draft by the Virginia Squires, before the Squires traded his draft rights to the Denver Nuggets. He opted to join the ABA with the Nuggets before moving to the NBA in 1976 after both leagues merged. During his first and only season in the ABA, he won the ABA All-Star Game MVP and ABA Rookie of the Year, as well as selected to the ABA All-Star Game and All-ABA Team. His NBA achievements include two All-NBA Team selections and four NBA All-Star Game selections. For his achievements, he has been inducted to the Basketball Hall of Fame. Marvin Webster, the 3rd pick, also opted to join the ABA with the Nuggets before moving to the NBA in 1976. Thompson and Webster were the only first-round picks from the draft who declined to play in the NBA and opted to play in the ABA. Coincidentally, Webster was also drafted by the Hawks, which means that both the Hawks' first-round picks did not play with them. Instead, both signed to play for the Nuggets in the ABA.

Gus Williams, the 20th pick, joined the Seattle SuperSonics after two seasons with the Golden State Warriors. He then won the NBA championship with the Sonics in 1979. He was also selected to two All-NBA Team and two All-Star Games. World B. Free (then known as Lloyd Free), the 23rd pick, played for five teams in his 13-year career and was selected to one All-NBA Team and one All-Star Game. Dan Roundfield, the 28th pick, was also drafted in the 1975 ABA Draft. He opted to join the ABA with the Indiana Pacers before moving to the NBA in 1976. His achievements include one All-NBA Team selection, three NBA All-Star Game selections, three NBA All-Star Game selections and four NBA All-Defensive Team selections. Alvan Adams from the University of Oklahoma, who went on to win the Rookie of the Year Award in his first season, was selected 4th by the Phoenix Suns. Adams and 6th pick Lionel Hollins are the only other players from this draft who was selected to an All-Star Game. After retiring as a player, Hollins went on to have a coaching career. He was twice named as the interim head coach for the Vancouver/Memphis Grizzlies in 1999 and 2004 before becoming a permanent head coach in 2009.

Darryl Dawkins, the 5th pick, and Bill Willoughby, the 19th pick, became the first two high school players to directly enter the NBA after their high school graduation. They also became the second and third players to go directly from high school basketball to professional league, after Moses Malone in the 1974 ABA Draft. They also became the second and third high school players ever drafted in the NBA, after Reggie Harding in the 1962 draft. However, because the rules prevented Harding from playing in the league until one year after his high school class graduated, he had to wait a year before entering the league in 1963. Dawkins played 14 seasons in the NBA with four different NBA teams, while Willoughby played 8 seasons with six teams.

In the tenth round, the New Orleans Jazz selected a Soviet basketball player Alexander Belov with the 161st pick. Belov, who was playing with Spartak Leningrad before the draft, stayed with the club until the end of his career. He had a successful career, winning two European Cup Winners' Cup and one Soviet Union championship, as well as four gold medals with the Soviet Union national team. For his achievements, he has been inducted by the International Basketball Federation (FIBA) to the FIBA Hall of Fame.

== Key ==
Pos.	G	F	C
Position	Guard	Forward	Center

^	Denotes player who has been inducted to the Naismith Memorial Basketball Hall of Fame
*	Denotes player who has been selected for at least one All-Star Game and All-NBA Team
^{+}	Denotes player who has been selected for at least one All-Star Game
^{#}	Denotes player who has never appeared in an NBA regular-season or playoff game
^{~}	Denotes player who has been selected as Rookie of the Year

== Draft ==
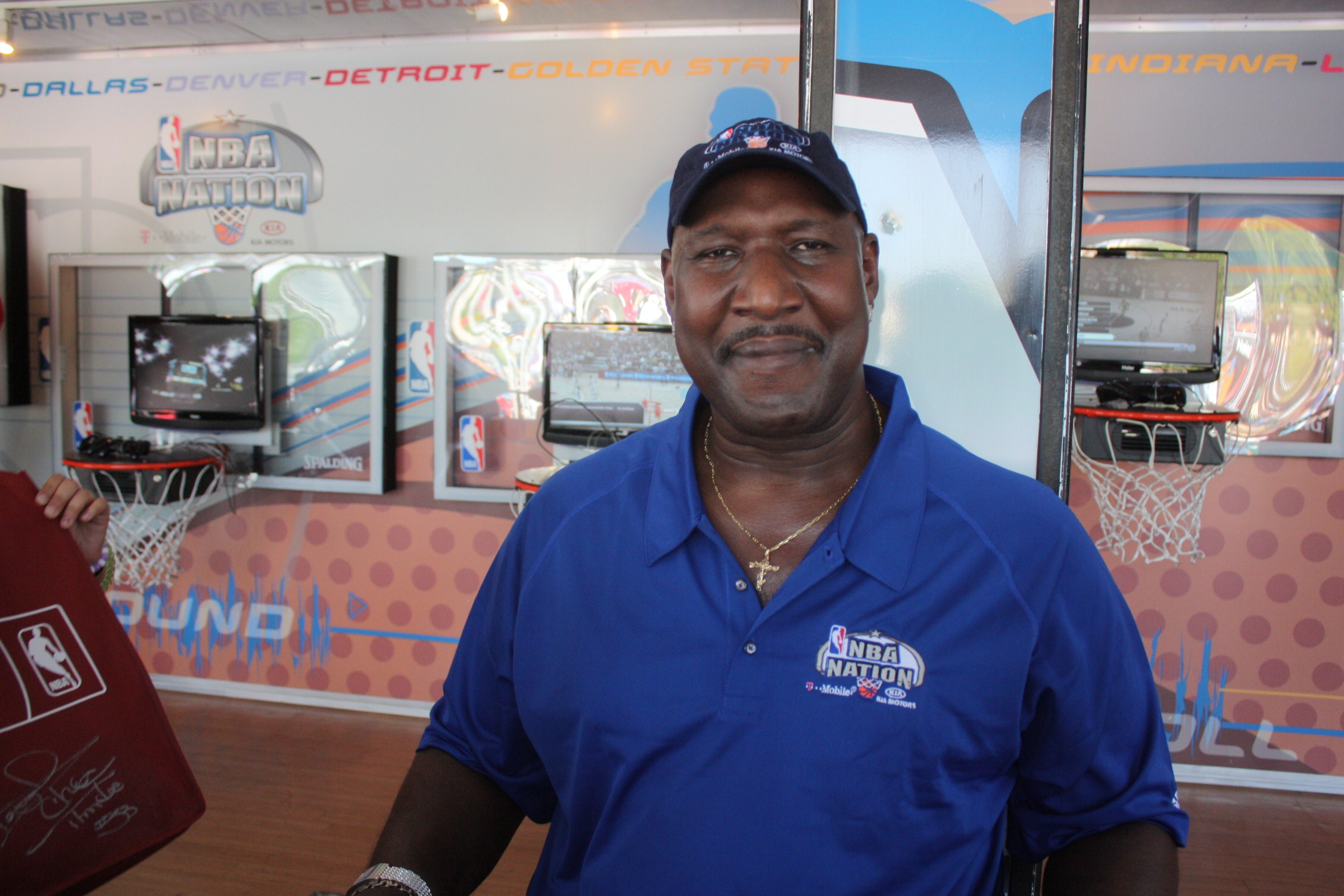
Darryl Dawkins was selected fifth overall by the Philadelphia 76ers.

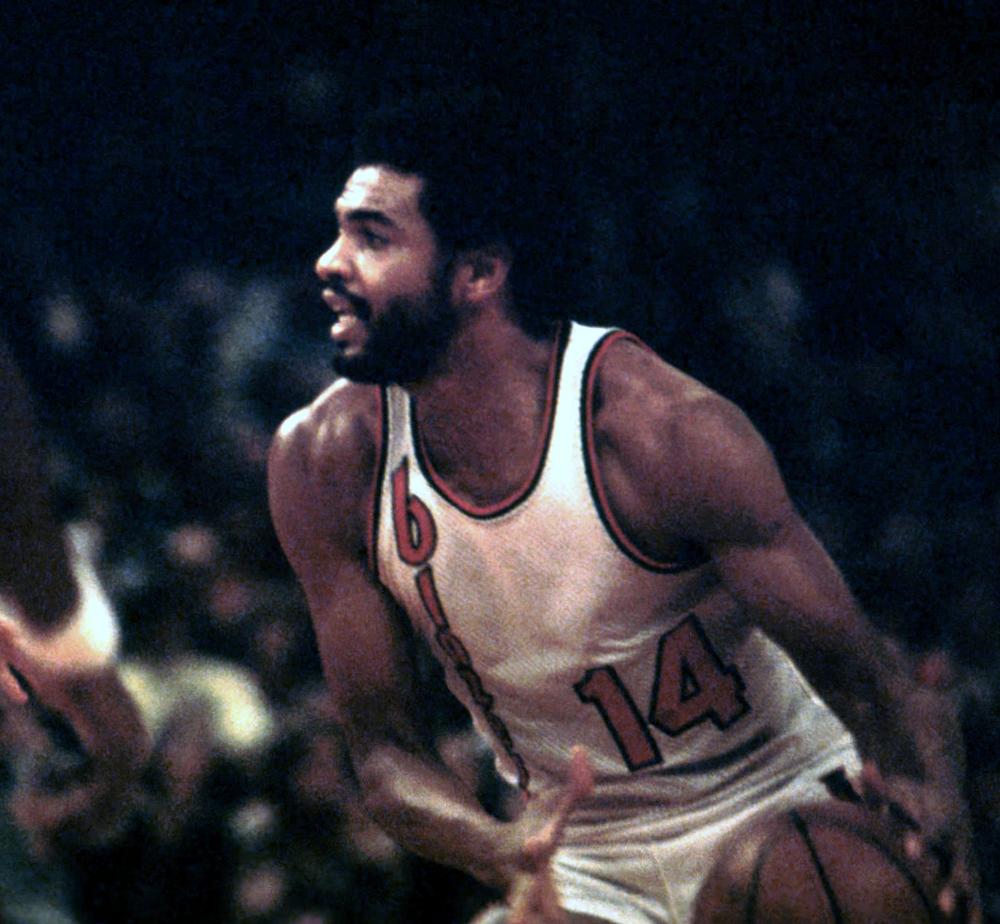
Lionel Hollins was selected 6th overall by the Portland Trail Blazers.

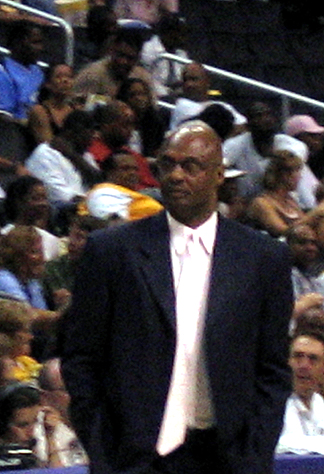
Joe Bryant was selected 14th overall by the Golden State Warriors.

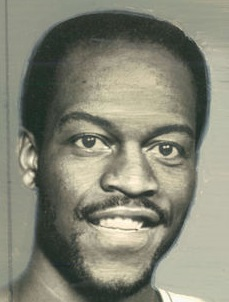
Gus Williams was selected 20th overall by the Golden State Warriors.

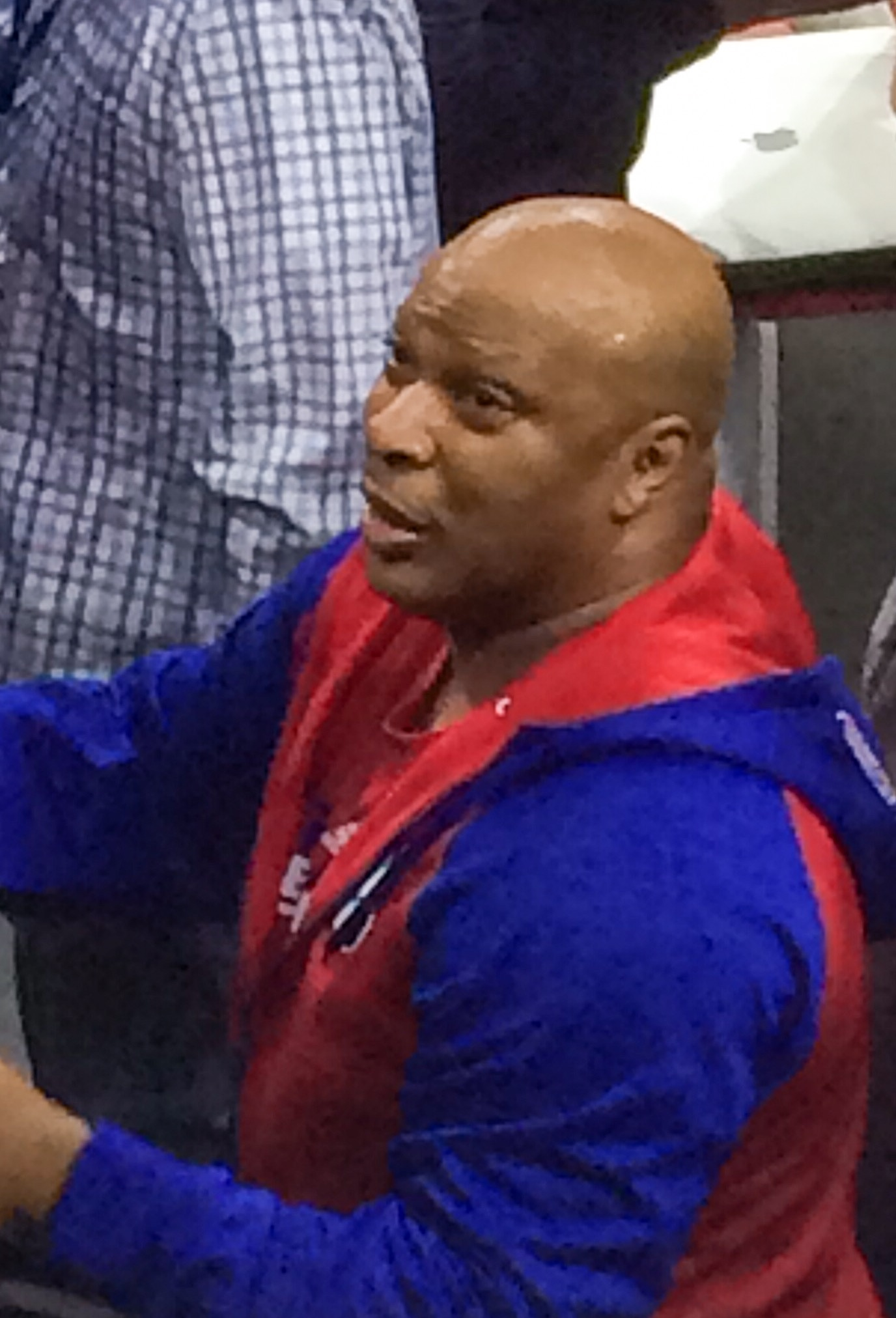
Lloyd Free (later World B. Free) was selected 23rd overall by the Philadelphia 76ers.

Round	Pick	Player	Pos.	Nationality	Team	School/club team
1	1	David Thompson^	G/F	United States	Atlanta Hawks (from New Orleans)^{[a]}	North Carolina State (Sr.)
1	2	David Meyers	F/C	United States	Los Angeles Lakers	UCLA (Sr.)
1	3	Marvin Webster	C	United States	Atlanta Hawks	Morgan State (Sr.)
1	4	Alvan Adams^{+}^{~}	F/C	United States	Phoenix Suns	Oklahoma (Jr.)
1	5	Darryl Dawkins	C	United States	Philadelphia 76ers	Maynard Evans HS (Florida) (HS Sr.)
1	6	Lionel Hollins^{+}	G	United States	Portland Trail Blazers	Arizona State (Sr.)
1	7	Rich Kelley	F/C	United States	New Orleans Jazz (from Milwaukee)^{[b]}	Stanford (Sr.)
1	8	Junior Bridgeman	G/F	United States	Los Angeles Lakers (from Cleveland)^{[c]}	Louisville (Sr.)
1	9	Gene Short	F	United States	New York Knicks	Jackson State (Jr.)
1	10	Bill Robinzine	F	United States	Kansas City Kings (from Detroit via New York and New Orleans)^{[d]}	DePaul (Sr.)
1	11	Joe Meriweather	F/C	United States	Houston Rockets	Southern Illinois (Sr.)
1	12	Frank Oleynick	G	United States	Seattle SuperSonics	Seattle (Jr.)
1	13	Bob Bigelow	G/F	United States	Kansas City Kings	Pennsylvania (Sr.)
1	14	Joe Bryant	F/C	United States	Golden State Warriors (from Chicago)^{[e]}	La Salle (Jr.)
1	15	John Lambert	F/C	United States	Cleveland Cavaliers (from Golden State)^{[f]}	USC (Sr.)
1	16	Ricky Sobers	G	United States	Phoenix Suns (from Buffalo)^{[g]}	UNLV (Sr.)
1	17	Tom Boswell	F/C	United States	Boston Celtics	South Carolina (Sr.)
1	18	Kevin Grevey	G/F	United States	Washington Bullets	Kentucky (Sr.)
2	19	Bill Willoughby	F/C	United States	Atlanta Hawks (from New Orleans)^{[a]}	Dwight Morrow HS (New Jersey) (HS Sr.)
2	20	Gus Williams*	G	United States	Golden State Warriors (from Los Angeles)^{[h]}	USC (Sr.)
2	21	Bruce Seals	F	United States	Seattle SuperSonics (from Atlanta)	Utah Stars (ABA)
2	22	Clyde Mayes	F	United States	Milwaukee Bucks (from Phoenix via New Orleans)^{[b]}	Furman (Sr.)
2	23	Lloyd Free*	G	United States	Philadelphia 76ers	Guilford (Jr.)
2	24	Cornelius Cash	F	United States	Milwaukee Bucks	Bowling Green (Sr.)
2	25	Bob Gross	G/F	United States	Portland Trail Blazers	Long Beach State (Sr.)
2	26	Luther Burden	G	United States	New York Knicks	Utah (Jr.)
2	27	Walter Luckett^{#}	G	United States	Detroit Pistons	Ohio (Jr.)
2	28	Dan Roundfield*	F/C	United States	Cleveland Cavaliers	Central Michigan (Sr.)
2	29	Jim Blanks^{#}	G/F	United States	Houston Rockets	Gardner–Webb (Sr.)
2	30	Steve Green	F	United States	Chicago Bulls (from Seattle)^{[i]}	Indiana (Sr.)
2	31	Glenn Hansen	G	United States	Kansas City Kings	LSU (Sr.)
2	32	John Laskowski	G	United States	Chicago Bulls	Indiana (Sr.)
2	33	Mel Utley^{#}	G	United States	Cleveland Cavaliers (from Golden State)^{[f]}	St. John's (Sr.)
2	34	Larry Fogle	G	United States	New York Knicks (from Buffalo via Chicago)^{[j]}	Canisius (Jr.)
2	35	Allen Murphy	G	United States	Phoenix Suns (from Washington)^{[k]}	Louisville (Sr.)
2	36	Jimmy Dan Conner^{#}	G	United States	Phoenix Suns (from Boston)^{[l]}	Kentucky (Sr.)
3	37	Rudy Hackett	F	United States	New Orleans Jazz	Syracuse (Sr.)
3	38	Jim McElroy	G	United States	New Orleans Jazz (from Los Angeles)^{[m]}	Central Michigan (Sr.)
3	39	Jimmie Baker^{#}	F	United States	Philadelphia 76ers	Hawaii (Sr.)
3	40	Otis Johnson^{#}	F	United States	Golden State Warriors	Stetson (Sr.)
3	41	Charles Cleveland^{#}	G	United States	Philadelphia 76ers	Alabama (Sr.)
3	42	Tom Roy^{#}	F	United States	Portland Trail Blazers	Maryland (Sr.)
3	43	Brian Hammel^{#}	G	United States	Milwaukee Bucks	Bentley (Sr.)
3	44	Pete Trgovich^{#}	G	United States	Detroit Pistons	UCLA (Sr.)
3	45	Ted Hathaway^{#}	G	United States	Cleveland Cavaliers	Cleveland State (Sr.)
3	46	John Ramsay^{#}	F	United States	New York Knicks	Seton Hall (Sr.)
3	47	Rudy White	G	United States	Houston Rockets	Arizona State (Sr.)
3	48	Tom Kropp	G	United States	Washington Bullets (from Seattle)^{[n]}	Kearney State (Sr.)
3	49	Bob Guyette^{#}	F	United States	Kansas City Kings	Kentucky (Sr.)
3	50	Gus Gerard	G/F	United States	Portland Trail Blazers (from Chicago)^{[o]}	Spirits of St. Louis (ABA)
3	51	Robert Hawkins	G	United States	Golden State Warriors	Illinois State (Jr.)
3	52	George Bucci^{#}	G	United States	Buffalo Braves	Manhattan (Sr.)
3	53	Jerome Anderson	G	United States	Boston Celtics	West Virginia (Sr.)
3	54	Bayard Forrest	C	United States	Phoenix Suns (from Washington)^{[p]}	Grand Canyon (Jr.)
4	55	Mack Coleman^{#}	F	United States	New Orleans Jazz	Houston Baptist (Sr.)
4	56	C. J. Kupec	F/C	United States	Los Angeles Lakers	Michigan (Sr.)
4	57	Monte Towe	G	United States	Atlanta Hawks	NC State (Sr.)
4	58	Sam McCants^{#}	G	United States	Phoenix Suns	Oral Roberts (Sr.)
4	59	Louis Dunbar^{#}	F	United States	Philadelphia 76ers	Houston (Sr.)
4	60	Bill Campion^{#}	C	United States	Milwaukee Bucks	Manhattan (Sr.)
4	61	Phil Hicks	F	United States	Portland Trail Blazers	Tulane (Sr.)
4	62	Eric Fernsten	F/C	United States	Cleveland Cavaliers	San Francisco (Sr.)
4	63	David Vaughn Jr.^{#}	C	United States	New York Knicks	Virginia Squires (ABA)
4	64	Lindsay Hairston	F/C	United States	Detroit Pistons	Michigan State (Sr.)
4	65	Ken Smith^{#}	F	United States	Houston Rockets	Tulsa (Sr.)
4	66	Jimmy Moore^{#}	F	United States	Seattle SuperSonics	Utah State (Sr.)
4	67	Kevin Cluess^{#}	G	United States	Kansas City Kings	St. John's (Sr.)
4	68	Ron Haigler^{#}	F	United States	Chicago Bulls	Penn (Sr.)
4	69	Billy Taylor^{#}	G	United States	Golden State Warriors	La Salle (Sr.)
4	70	Bob Fleischer^{#}	F	United States	Buffalo Braves	Blue (Sr.)
4	71	Fessor Leonard^{#}	C	United States	Washington Bullets	Furman (Sr.)
4	72	Cyrus Mann^{#}	C	United States	Boston Celtics	Illinois State (Fr.)
5	73	Andre Hampton^{#}	C	United States	New Orleans Jazz	Kentucky State (Sr.)
5	74	Charles Russell^{#}	G	United States	Los Angeles Lakers	Alabama (Sr.)
5	75	Wilbur Holland	G	United States	Atlanta Hawks	New Orleans (Sr.)
5	76	Joe Pace	C	United States	Phoenix Suns	Coppin State (Jr.)
5	77	Ken Tyler^{#}	G	United States	Philadelphia 76ers	Gonzaga (Sr.)
5	78	Maurice Presley^{#}	C	United States	Portland Trail Blazers	Houston (Sr.)
5	79	Jim Lee^{#}	G	United States	Cleveland Cavaliers	Syracuse (Sr.)
5	80	Donald Washington^{#}	F	United States	New York Knicks	Denver Nuggets (ABA)
5	81	Cliff Pratt^{#}	G	United States	Detroit Pistons	Shaw College (Sr.)
5	82	Mike Odemns^{#}	C	United States	Cleveland Cavaliers	Western Kentucky (Sr.)
5	83	Rick Whitlow^{#}	G	United States	Houston Rockets	Illinois State (Sr.)
5	84	Dwain Govan^{#}	G	United States	Seattle SuperSonics	Bishop (Sr.)
5	85	Ed Stahl^{#}	F	United States	Kansas City Kings	North Carolina (Sr.)
5	86	Bob Iverson^{#}	F	United States	Chicago Bulls	North Texas (Sr.)
5	87	Larry Pounds^{#}	F	United States	Golden State Warriors	Washington (Sr.)
5	88	Sam Berry^{#}	F	United States	Buffalo Braves	Armstrong Atlantic State (Sr.)
5	89	Darryl Brown^{#}	C	United States	Boston Celtics	Fordham (Sr.)
5	90	Rich Jones^{#}	G	United States	Washington Bullets	VCU (Sr.)
6	91	Rick Schmidt^{#}	F	United States	New Orleans Jazz	Illinois (Sr.)
6	92	Don Ford	F	United States	Los Angeles Lakers	UC Santa Barbara (Sr.)
6	93	Danny Williams^{#}	F	United States	Atlanta Hawks	Mississippi College (Sr.)
6	94	Biff Burrell^{#}	G	United States	Phoenix Suns	USC (Sr.)
6	95	Ken Alston^{#}	F	United States	Philadelphia 76ers	Valdosta State (Sr.)
6	96	Oliver Purnell^{#}	G	United States	Milwaukee Bucks	Old Dominion (Sr.)
6	97	Gerald Willett^{#}	F	United States	Portland Trail Blazers	Oregon (Sr.)
6	98	Allen Spruill^{#}	F	United States	Detroit Pistons	North Carolina A&T (Sr.)
6	99	Henry Ward	G/F	United States	Cleveland Cavaliers	Jackson State (Sr.)
6	100	Hank Williams^{#}	F	United States	New York Knicks	Utah Stars (ABA)
6	101	William Johnson^{#}	F	United States	Houston Rockets	Texas Tech (Sr.)
6	102	Larry Smith^{#}	F	United States	Seattle SuperSonics	North Carolina A&T (Jr.)
6	103	Clint Chapman^{#}	F	United States	Kansas City Kings	USC (Sr.)
6	104	Bill Andreas^{#}	F	United States	Chicago Bulls	Ohio State (Sr.)
6	105	Tony Styles^{#}	G	United States	Golden State Warriors	San Francisco (Sr.)
6	106	George Jackson^{#}	G	United States	Buffalo Braves	Charlotte (Sr.)
6	107	John Garrett^{#}	C	United States	Washington Bullets	Purdue (Sr.)
6	108	Rick Coleman^{#}	G	United States	Boston Celtics	Jacksonville (Sr.)
7	109	Bill Higgins^{#}	G	United States	New Orleans Jazz	Virginia Squires (ABA)
7	110	Rick Suttle^{#}	F	United States	Los Angeles Lakers	Kansas (Sr.)
7	111	Gus Johnson^{#}	F	United States	Atlanta Hawks	Winona State (Sr.)
7	112	Dave Edmonds^{#}	G	United States	Phoenix Suns	West Georgia (Sr.)
7	113	Mike Flynn	G	United States	Philadelphia 76ers	Kentucky (Sr.)
7	114	Steve Fields^{#}	F	United States	Portland Trail Blazers	Miami (Ohio) (Sr.)
7	115	Wilbur Thomas^{#}	F	United States	Milwaukee Bucks	American (Sr.)
7	116	Shawn Leftwich^{#}	F	United States	Cleveland Cavaliers	Jacksonville (Sr.)
7	117	Pete Davis^{#}	G	United States	New York Knicks	Michigan State (Sr.)
7	118	Ike Williams^{#}	G	United States	Detroit Pistons	Armstrong Atlantic State (Sr.)
7	119	Nate Barnett^{#}	G	United States	Houston Rockets	Akron (Sr.)
7	120	Hollis Miller^{#}	F	United States	Seattle SuperSonics	Drury (Sr.)
7	121	Wayne Croft^{#}	F	United States	Kansas City Kings	Clemson (Sr.)
7	122	John Grochowalski^{#}	F	United States	Chicago Bulls	Assumption (Sr.)
7	123	Stan Boyer^{#}	F	United States	Golden State Warriors	Wyoming (Sr.)
7	124	Mike Franklin^{#}	F	United States	Buffalo Braves	Cincinnati (Sr.)
7	125	Al Boswell^{#}	G	United States	Boston Celtics	Oral Roberts (Sr.)
7	126	Fletcher Johnson^{#}	F	United States	Washington Bullets	Randolph–Macon (Sr.)
8	127	Harvey Carmichael^{#}	G	United States	New Orleans Jazz	Kentucky State (Sr.)
8	128	Mike Cashman^{#}	F	United States	Los Angeles Lakers	Willamette (Sr.)
8	129	Oscar Jackson^{#}	G	United States	Atlanta Hawks	Duquesne (Sr.)
8	130	Jack Schrader^{#}	F	United States	Phoenix Suns	Arizona State (Sr.)
8	131	Freeman Blade^{#}	G	United States	Philadelphia 76ers	Eastern Montana (Jr.)
8	132	Bob McCurdy^{#}	F	United States	Milwaukee Bucks	Richmond (Sr.)
8	133	Charlie Neal^{#}	G	United States	Portland Trail Blazers	Oregon State (Sr.)
8	134	Jerry Homan^{#}	F	United States	New York Knicks	Marquette (Sr.)
8	135	John Kelley^{#}	G	United States	Detroit Pistons	Dillard (Sr.)
8	136	Andre McCarter	G	United States	Cleveland Cavaliers	UCLA (Jr.)
8	137	Leon Johnson^{#}	F	United States	Houston Rockets	Centenary (Sr.)
8	138	Ken McKenzie^{#}	C	Canada	Seattle SuperSonics	Montana (Sr.)
8	139	Jim Bostic	F	United States	Kansas City Kings	New Mexico State (Sr.)
8	140	John Murphy^{#}	F	United States	Chicago Bulls	UMass (Sr.)
8	141	Mike Rozenski^{#}	F	United States	Golden State Warriors	Saint Mary's (California) (Sr.)
8	142	Allan Jones^{#}	F	United States	Buffalo Braves	San Diego (Sr.)
8	143	Bruce Hamming^{#}	C	United States	Washington Bullets	Augustana College (Illinois) (Sr.)
8	144	Roger Morningstar^{#}	F	United States	Boston Celtics	Kansas (Sr.)
9	145	Fred Stokes^{#}	G	United States	New Orleans Jazz	Barber–Scotia (Sr.)
9	146	Dave Schlesser^{#}	C	United States	Atlanta Hawks	Morningside (Sr.)
9	147	Owen Brown^{#}	F	United States	Phoenix Suns	Maryland (Sr.)
9	148	Larry Haralson^{#}	F	United States	Philadelphia 76ers	Drake (Sr.)
9	149	Quentin Braxton^{#}	F	United States	Portland Trail Blazers	Portland (Sr.)
9	150	Eric Hayes^{#}	G	United States	Milwaukee Bucks	Montana (Sr.)
9	151	Terry Thomas	F	United States	Detroit Pistons	Detroit (Sr.)
9	152	Skip Howard^{#}	F	United States	Cleveland Cavaliers	Bowling Green (Sr.)
9	153	Tim van Blommesteyn^{#}	G	United States	New York Knicks	Princeton (Sr.)
9	154	Steve Strother^{#}	G	United States	Houston Rockets	Providence (Sr.)
9	155	Rich Haws^{#}	F	United States	Seattle SuperSonics	Utah State (Sr.)
9	156	Gary Tomaszewski^{#}	F	United States	Chicago Bulls	St. Mary's (Texas) (Sr.)
9	157	Scott Trobbe^{#}	F	United States	Golden State Warriors	Stanford (Sr.)
9	158	George Rautins^{#}	G	Canada	Buffalo Braves	Niagara (Sr.)
9	159	Robert Rhodes^{#}	F	United States	Boston Celtics	Albany State (Sr.)
9	160	Doug Brookins^{#}	F	United States	Washington Bullets	Creighton (Sr.)
10	Chicago Bulls (forfeited due to selection of ineligible player) (Note: The Bulls attempted to draft Moses Malone, who at the time was playing for the Utah Stars of the rivaling American Basketball Association via the 1974 ABA draft directly from Petersburg High School in Petersburg, Virginia. However, Deputy NBA Commissioner Simon Gourdine informed the Bulls that Malone had not made himself eligible for the hardship draft and thus was not eligible for the draft this year. In an effort to protect the integrity of the draft, Gourdine marked the selection as a pass instead. He would later be selected in the supplementary draft near the end of the year by the New Orleans Jazz.)					
10	161	Alexander Belov^{#}	F	Soviet Union	New Orleans Jazz	Spartak Leningrad (Soviet Union)
10	162	Vic Kelly^{#}	G	United States	Atlanta Hawks	Hawaii (Sr.)
10	163	Mike Moon^{#}	G	United States	Phoenix Suns	Arizona State (Sr.)
10	164	Ric Reed^{#}	G	United States	Philadelphia 76ers	Azusa Pacific (Sr.)
10	165	Romie Thomas^{#}	G	United States	Milwaukee Bucks	Wisconsin–Eau Claire (Sr.)
10	166	Tyree Foster^{#}	F	United States	Portland Trail Blazers	Portland State (Sr.)
10	167	Eric Anderson^{#}	G	United States	Cleveland Cavaliers	Macalester (Sr.)
10	168	Moe Rivers^{#}	G	United States	New York Knicks	NC State (Sr.)
10	169	Mickey Fox^{#}	G	United States	Detroit Pistons	Saint Mary's (Halifax) (Sr.)
10	170	Jerry Bellotti^{#}	F	United States	Seattle SuperSonics	Santa Clara (Sr.)
10	171	Maurice Harper^{#}	G	United States	Golden State Warriors	Saint Mary's (California) (Sr.)
10	172	Art Allen^{#}	G	United States	Buffalo Braves	Pepperdine (Jr.)
10	173	Mike Fahey^{#}	G	United States	Washington Bullets	Brandeis (Sr.)
10	174	Bill Endicott^{#}	G	United States	Boston Celtics	UMass (Sr.)

== Notable undrafted players ==
These players were not selected in the 1975 draft but played at least one game in the NBA.

Player	Pos.	Nationality	School/club team
Robin Jones	F	United States	Saint Louis (Sr.)
Irv Kiffin	F	United States	Oklahoma Baptist (Sr.)

== Trades ==
- ^{a 1} ^{2} On May 20, 1974, the Atlanta Hawks acquired Bob Kauffman, Dean Meminger, 1974 and 1975 first-round picks, 1975 and 1976 second-round picks, and a 1980 third-round pick from the New Orleans Jazz in exchange for Pete Maravich. The Hawks used the picks to draft David Thompson and Bill Willoughby.
- ^{b 1} ^{2} On October 8, 1974, the New Orleans Jazz acquired Russ Lee and a first-round pick from the Milwaukee Bucks in exchange for Steve Kuberski and a second-round pick. Previously, the Jazz acquired Neal Walk and the pick on September 16, 1974, from the Phoenix Suns in exchange for Dennis Awtrey, Nate Hawthorne, Curtis Perry and a 1976 first-round pick. The Jazz used the pick to draft Rich Kelley. The Bucks used the pick to draft Clyde Mayes.
- ^{c} On May 17, 1974, the Los Angeles Lakers acquired a first-round pick from the Cleveland Cavaliers in exchange for Jim Chones. The Lakers used the pick to draft Junior Bridgeman.
- ^{d} On May 28, 1975, the Kansas City Kings acquired the tenth pick from the New Orleans Jazz in exchange for Ron Behagen and a 1976 second-round pick. Previously the Jazz acquired Henry Bibby and a first-round pick on February 1, 1975, from the New York Knicks in exchange for Jim Barnett and Neal Walk. Previously the Knicks acquired the pick on December 26, 1974, from the Detroit Pistons in exchange for Howard Porter. The Kings used the pick to draft Bill Robinzine.
- ^{e} On September 3, 1974, the Golden State Warriors acquired Clifford Ray and a first-round pick from the Chicago Bulls in exchange for Nate Thurmond. The Warriors used the pick to draft Joe Bryant.
- ^{f 1} ^{2} On the draft-day, the Cleveland Cavaliers acquired Butch Beard, a first-round pick and a second-round pick from the Golden State Warriors in exchange for Dwight Davis. The Cavaliers used the picks to draft John Lambert and Mel Utley.
- ^{g} On the draft-day, the Phoenix Suns acquired a first-round pick from the Buffalo Braves in exchange for a 1976 first-round pick. The Suns used the pick to draft Ricky Sobers.
- ^{h} On September 24, 1974, the Golden State Warriors acquired a second-round pick from the Los Angeles Lakers in exchange for Zelmo Beaty. The Warriors used the pick to draft Gus Williams.
- ^{i} On January 7, 1974, the Chicago Bulls acquired a second-round pick from the Seattle SuperSonics in exchange for John Hummer. The Bulls used the pick to draft Steve Green.
- ^{j} On May 28, 1974, the New York Knicks acquired Howard Porter and a second-round pick from the Chicago Bulls in exchange for a 1974 first-round pick. Previously the Bulls acquired John Hummer, the pick and a 1974 second-round pick on September 10, 1973, from the Buffalo Braves in exchange for Gar Heard and Kevin Kunnert. The Knicks used the pick to draft Larry Fogle.
- ^{k} On September 6, 1974, the Phoenix Suns acquired Dave Stallworth and a second-round pick from the Washington Bullets in exchange for Clem Haskins. The Suns used the pick to draft Allen Murphy.
- ^{l} On May 23, 1975, the Phoenix Suns acquired Paul Westphal, 1975 and 1976 second-round picks from the Boston Celtics in exchange for Charlie Scott. The Suns used the pick to draft Jimmy Dan Conner.
- ^{m} On December 6, 1974, the New Orleans Jazz acquired a third-round pick from the Los Angeles Lakers in exchange for Stu Lantz. The Jazz used the pick to draft Jim McElroy.
- ^{n} On August 20, 1974, the Washington Bullets acquired Dick Gibbs and a third-round pick from the Seattle SuperSonics in exchange for Archie Clark. The Bullets used the pick to draft Tom Kropp.
- ^{o} On September 18, 1974, the Portland Trail Blazers acquired a third-round pick from the Chicago Bulls in exchange for Mickey Johnson. The Blazers used the pick to draft Gus Gerard.
- ^{p} On October 9, 1973, the Phoenix Suns acquired 1974 and 1975 third-round picks from the Washington Bullets (as the Capital Bullets) in exchange for Walt Wesley. The Suns used the pick to draft Bayard Forrest.

== Early entrants ==
=== College underclassmen ===
For the fifth straight year in a row, the NBA would utilize the hardship exception for young underclassmen to enter the NBA draft. For the second straight year in a row, twenty underclassmen initially declared entry for this year's draft, but three of these players in the University of Notre Dame's Adrian Dantley, Morris Brown College's Harry Davis, and Tunxis Community College's Glenn Matthews would later decline entry into this year's draft. The following college basketball players successfully applied for an NBA hardship.

- (United States) Alvan Adams – C/F, Oklahoma (junior)
- (United States) Joe Bryant – F, La Salle (junior)
- (United States) Luther Burden – G, Utah (junior)
- (United States) Henry Fields – G, Ohio State (freshman)
- (United States) Larry Fogle – G, Canisius (junior)
- (United States) Bayard Forrest – C, Grand Canyon (junior)
- (United States) Lloyd Free – G, Guilford (junior)
- (United States) Robert Hawkins – G, Illinois State (junior)
- (United States) Walter Luckett – G, Ohio (junior)
- (United States) Cyrus Mann – C, Illinois State (freshman)
- (United States) Glen Matthews – F, Tunxis CC (junior)
- (United States) Frank Oleynick – G, Seattle (junior)
- (United States) Joe Pace – C, Coppin State (junior)
- (United States) Eugene Short – F, Jackson State (junior)
- (United States) Larry Smith – F, North Carolina A&T (junior)

=== High school players ===
This year's draft was also the first one in NBA history to officially allow for high school seniors to enter the NBA draft via hardship exceptions. This year saw two high school players qualify for these hardships. It was also the only NBA draft to see high school declare their entry into the NBA directly from high school until 1995. The following high schoolers successfully applied for an NBA hardship.

- (United States) Darryl Dawkins – C, Maynard Evans HS (Orlando, Florida)
- (United States) Bill Willoughby – F, Dwight Morrow HS (Englewood, New Jersey)

== Supplementary draft ==
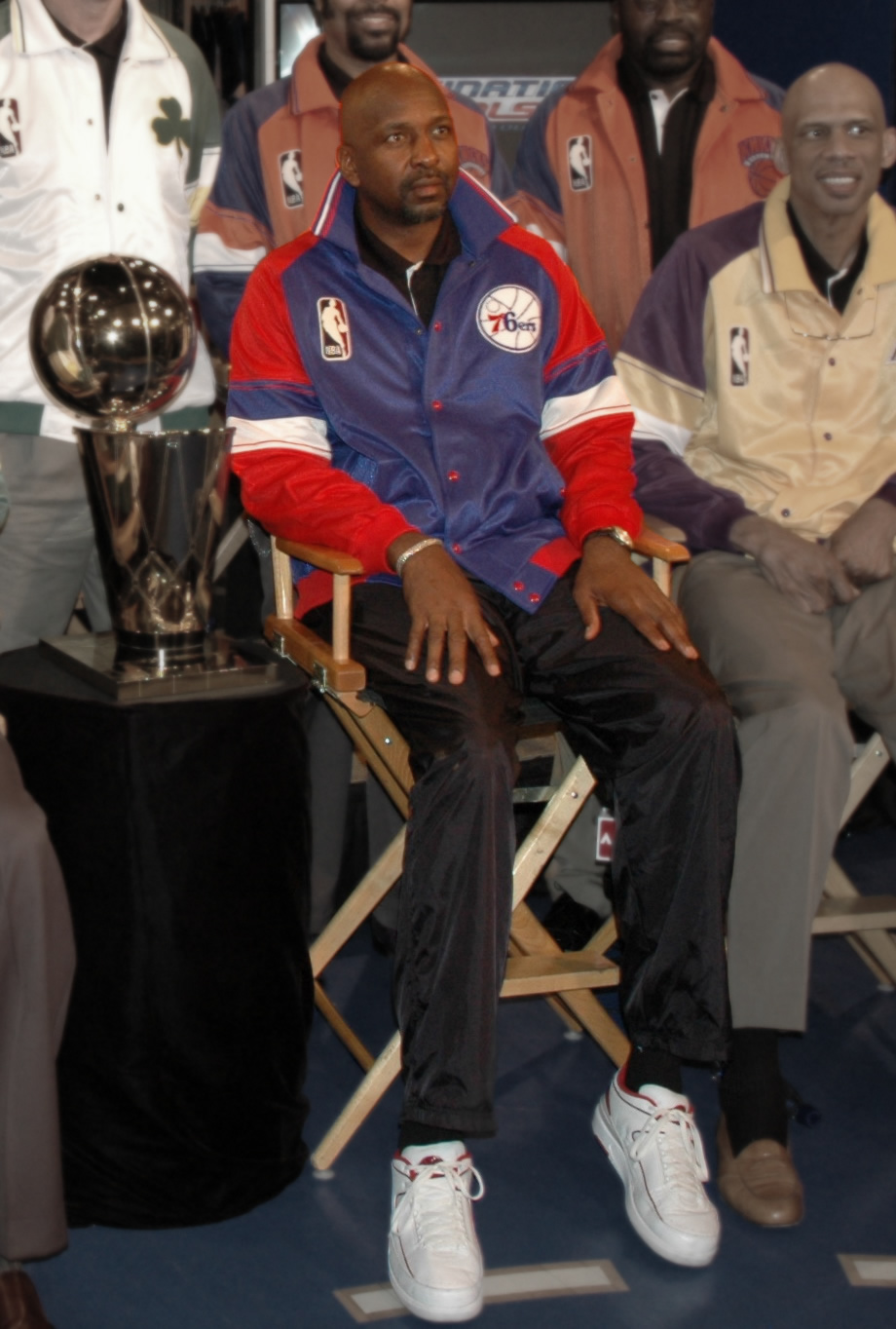
Moses Malone was selected by the New Orleans Jazz with the first pick of the supplementary draft involving the ABA's younger players.

On December 9, 1975, the NBA planned to host a supplementary draft to settle negotiating rights to five ABA players who had never been eligible for the NBA draft because their college classes had not graduated and they had not apply for hardship. The teams selected in reverse order of their win–loss record in the previous season. The team that made a selection must withdraw their equivalent selection in the 1976 draft. The teams were allowed to not exercise their rights on this hardship draft and thus retained their full selection in the 1976 draft. The draft itself attracted strong opposition from the rivaling ABA, who accused the NBA of trying to reduce confidence in the stability of their own league since they had gone from ten teams to seven in a three month period, with the Virginia Squires also facing significant struggles that saw them be likely to fold next during the season. Despite the initial postponement of the draft, the draft was finally held on December 30, 1975.

The New Orleans Jazz used the first pick to select Moses Malone, a former high school player who went directly to professional basketball after he was drafted in the 1974 ABA draft. The Los Angeles Lakers used the second pick to select Mark Olberding, a college freshman who was drafted in the 1974 ABA draft. Because the Jazz and the Lakers had traded their first-round picks in the 1976 draft, they had to forfeit their first-round pick in the 1977 draft. The other players selected were Mel Bennett, Skip Wise and Charles Jordan in the second, third and fourth-round respectively. All players, except Wise, were under contract with their ABA team at the time of the draft. Those same four players also remained with their ABA teams in question until the end of the season as well. After the Virginia Squires folded before the ABA–NBA merger in June 1976, Bennett joined the team that drafted him, the Philadelphia 76ers. Under the merger agreement, the Jazz and the Lakers had to yield their rights to Malone and Olberding, but they regained their 1977 first-round picks. Malone was later drafted by the Portland Trail Blazers in the ABA Dispersal Draft, while Olberding remained with the Spurs who joined the NBA. Mel Bennett would later end up signing a new free agency deal with the Indiana Pacers following the ABA-NBA merger and subsequent ABA dispersal draft due to the Squires folding operations a month before the official merger occurred and Bennett being a proper free agent at the time. Two other draftees, Wise and Jordan, never played in the NBA, with Wise being waived by the Spurs during the season and never playing professionally again in either league afterward due to drug troubles (primarily with heroin) and Jordan being cut by the Pacers following the eventual ABA-NBA merger and later playing overseas instead.

Round	Pick	Player	Pos.	Nationality	Team	ABA team
1	1	Moses Malone^	F/C	United States	New Orleans Jazz	Spirits of St. Louis
1	2	Mark Olberding	F	United States	Los Angeles Lakers	San Antonio Spurs
2	3	Mel Bennett	F	United States	Philadelphia 76ers	Virginia Squires
3	4	Skip Wise^{#}	G	United States	Golden State Warriors	San Antonio Spurs
4	5	Charles Jordan^{#}	F	United States	Buffalo Braves	Indiana Pacers

== Notes ==
1: Lloyd Free changed his first name into World, his nickname, in 1981 and is commonly known as World B. Free.

== See also ==
- List of first overall NBA draft picks
