= Jim Blanks =

American basketball player (born 1952)

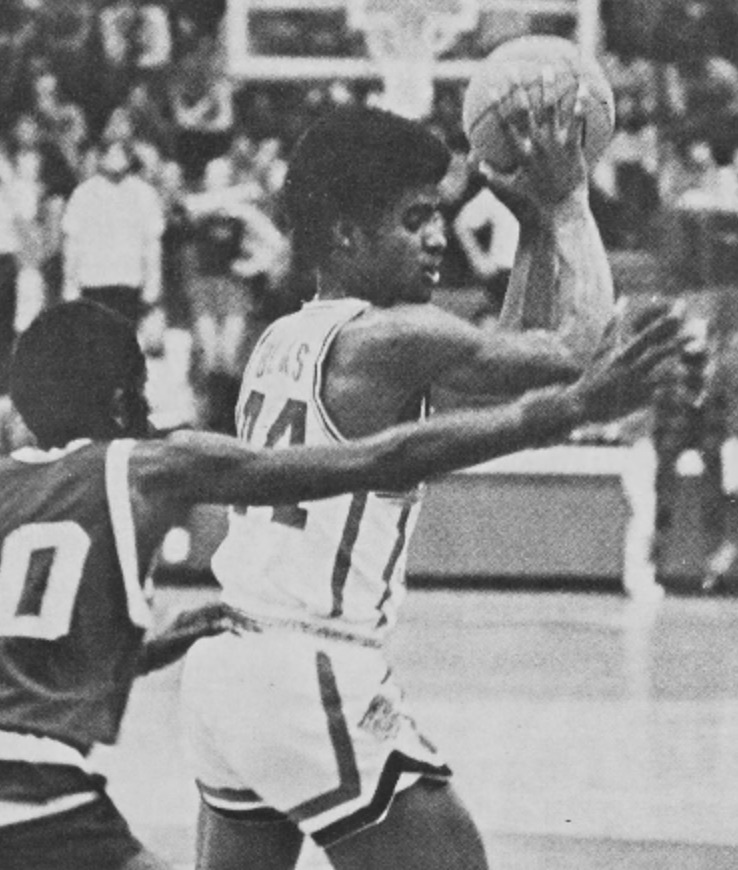
- Blanks with the Gardner–Webb Runnin' Bulldogs in 1975

Personal information
- Born: August 13, 1952 (age 74) Kansas City, Missouri, U.S.
- Listed height: 6 ft 5 in (1.96 m)
- Listed weight: 195 lb (88 kg)

Career information
- College: Moberly Area CC (1971–1972); Gardner–Webb (1972–1975)
- NBA draft: 1975: 2nd round, 29th overall pick
- Drafted by: Houston Rockets
- Position: Shooting guard / small forward

Career highlights
- NAIA All-American (1975)
- Stats at Basketball Reference

Jim Blanks (born August 13, 1952) is an American former basketball player. He began his collegiate career with the Moberly Greyhounds before he transferred to play for the Gardner–Webb Runnin' Bulldogs for his final three seasons of eligibility. Blanks was an NAIA All-American selection during his senior season in 1974–75. He ranks in the top 10 of total points and rebounds for the Runnin' Bulldogs.

Blanks was selected by the Houston Rockets as the 29th overall pick in the 1975 NBA draft. He was waived by the Rockets on the eve of the 1975–76 NBA season and ultimately never played a game in the National Basketball Association (NBA).
