= 1974 NCAA Men's Basketball All-Americans =

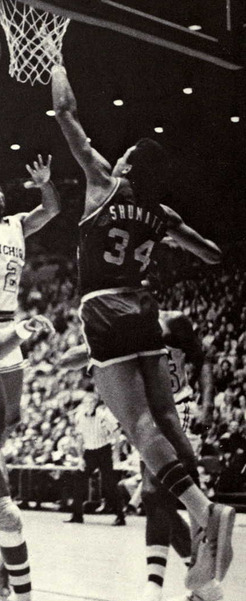
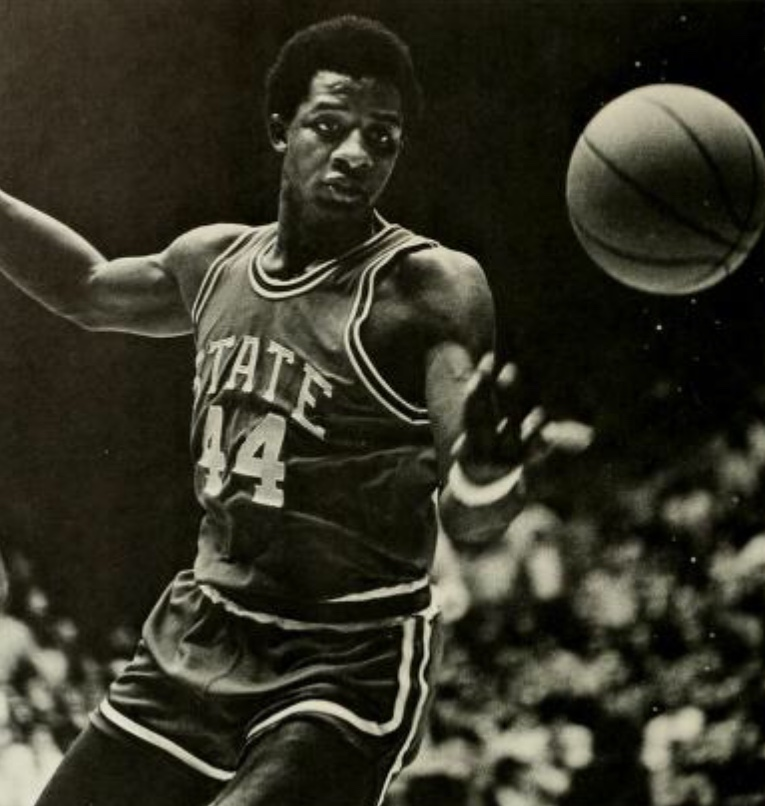
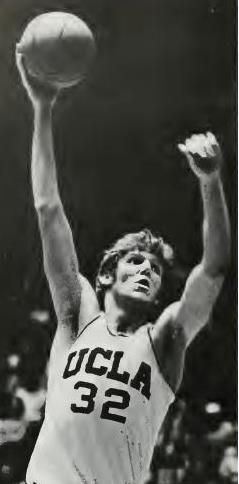
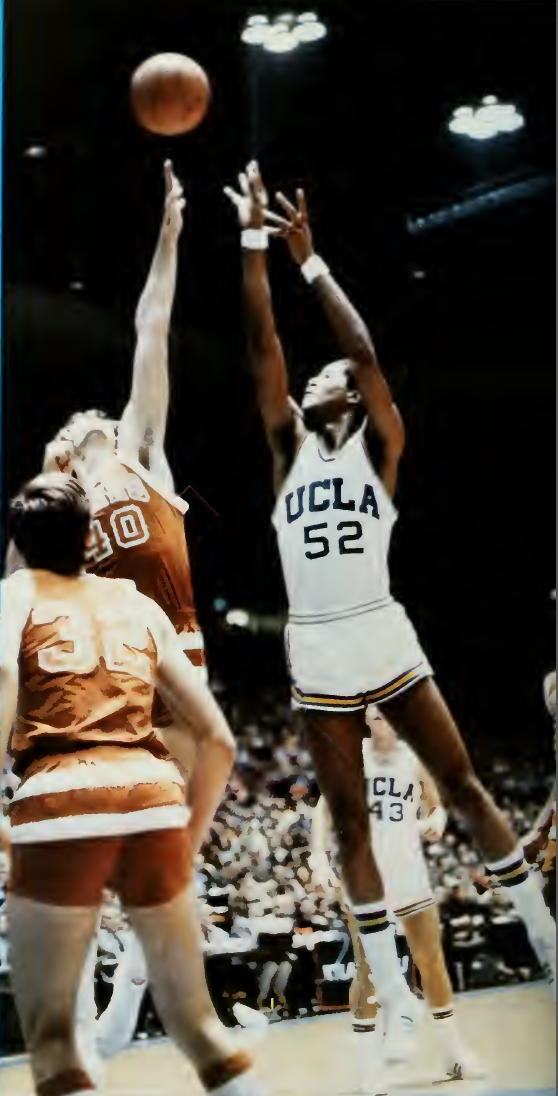
- Members of the 1974 Consensus All-America first team. Clockwise from upper left: Shumate, Thompson, Wilkes and Walton (not pictured: Barnes).
- Awarded for: 1973–74 NCAA Division I men's basketball season

The consensus 1974 College Basketball All-American team, as determined by aggregating the results of four major All-American teams. To earn "consensus" status, a player must win honors from a majority of the following teams: the Associated Press, the USBWA, The United Press International and the National Association of Basketball Coaches.

== 1974 Consensus All-America team ==
Consensus First Team
Player	Position	Class	Team
Marvin Barnes	C	Senior	Providence
John Shumate	F	Junior	Notre Dame
David Thompson	G/F	Junior	North Carolina State
Bill Walton	C	Senior	UCLA
Keith Wilkes	G/F	Senior	UCLA

Consensus Second Team
Player	Position	Class	Team
Len Elmore	C	Junior	Maryland
Larry Fogle	G	Sophomore	Canisius
Bobby Jones	F	Senior	North Carolina
Billy Knight	G/F	Senior	Pittsburgh
Campy Russell	F	Junior	Michigan

== Individual All-America teams ==
All-America Team
All-America Team	First team		Second team		Third team		Fourth Team		Fifth Team	
All-America Team	Player	School	Player	School	Player	School	Player	School	Player	School
Associated Press	Marvin Barnes	Providence	Len Elmore	Maryland	Tom Burleson	North Carolina State	No fourth or fifth teams			
Associated Press	John Shumate	Notre Dame	Larry Fogle	Canisius	Dennis DuVal	Syracuse	No fourth or fifth teams			
Associated Press	David Thompson	North Carolina State	Bobby Jones	North Carolina	Tom Henderson	Hawaii	No fourth or fifth teams			
Associated Press	Bill Walton	UCLA	Billy Knight	Pittsburgh	Tom McMillen	Maryland	No fourth or fifth teams			
Associated Press	Keith Wilkes	UCLA	John Lucas	Maryland	Campy Russell	Michigan	No fourth or fifth teams			
USBWA	Marvin Barnes	Providence	Len Elmore	Maryland	No third, fourth or fifth teams					
USBWA	John Shumate	Notre Dame	Larry Fogle	Canisius	No third, fourth or fifth teams					
USBWA	David Thompson	North Carolina State	Bobby Jones	North Carolina	No third, fourth or fifth teams					
USBWA	Bill Walton	UCLA	Billy Knight	Pittsburgh	No third, fourth or fifth teams					
USBWA	Keith Wilkes	UCLA	Campy Russell	Michigan	No third, fourth or fifth teams					
NABC	Marvin Barnes	Providence	Len Elmore	Maryland	Tom Burleson	North Carolina State	Alvan Adams	Oklahoma	Gary Brokaw	Notre Dame
NABC	John Shumate	Notre Dame	Bobby Jones	North Carolina	Larry Fogle	Canisius	Quinn Buckner	Indiana	Louis Dunbar	Houston
NABC	David Thompson	North Carolina State	Billy Knight	Pittsburgh	John Lucas	Maryland	Tom Henderson	Hawaii	Dennis DuVal	Syracuse
NABC	Bill Walton	UCLA	Tom McMillen	Maryland	Maurice Lucas	Marquette	Ron Lee	Oregon	Kevin Grevey	Kentucky
NABC	Keith Wilkes	UCLA	Campy Russell	Michigan	Kevin Stacom	Providence	Jan van Breda Kolff	Vanderbilt	Robert Parish	Centenary
UPI	Marvin Barnes	Providence	Tom Burleson	North Carolina State	Gary Brokaw	Notre Dame	No fourth or fifth teams			
UPI	John Shumate	Notre Dame	Len Elmore	Maryland	Billy Knight	Pittsburgh	No fourth or fifth teams			
UPI	David Thompson	North Carolina State	Larry Fogle	Canisius	Kevin Stacom	Providence	No fourth or fifth teams			
UPI	Bill Walton	UCLA	Bobby Jones	North Carolina	Campy Russell	Michigan	No fourth or fifth teams			
UPI	Keith Wilkes	UCLA	Tom McMillen	Maryland	Fly Williams	Austin Peay	No fourth or fifth teams			

AP Honorable Mention:

- Alvan Adams, Oklahoma
- Dan Anderson, USC
- Lloyd Batts, Cincinnati
- Leon Benbow, Jacksonville
- Willie Biles, Tulsa
- Lionel Billingy, Duquesne
- Junior Bridgeman, Louisville
- Gary Brokaw, Notre Dame
- Quinn Buckner, Indiana
- Luther Burden, Utah
- Tony Byers, Wake Forest
- Bill Campion, Manhattan
- Charles Cleveland, Alabama
- Adrian Dantley, Notre Dame
- Jesse Dark, VCU
- Leon Douglas, Alabama
- Louis Dunbar, Houston
- Darrell Elston, North Carolina
- Alex English, South Carolina
- Gus Gerard, Virginia
- Kevin Grevey, Kentucky
- Bernard Hardin, New Mexico
- Gene Harmon, Creighton
- Phil Hicks, Tulane
- Rich Kelley, Stanford
- Bruce King, Texas–Pan American
- Lon Kruger, Kansas State
- Ron Lee, Oregon
- Maurice Lucas, Marquette
- Walter Luckett, Ohio
- Clyde Mayes, Furman
- Sam McCants, Oral Roberts
- Eric Money, Arizona
- Allen Murphy, Louisville
- Coniel Norman, Arizona
- Frank Oleynick, Seattle
- Robert Parish, Centenary
- Cliff Pondexter, Long Beach State
- Larry Robinson, Texas
- Mike Robinson, Michigan State
- Phil Sellers, Rutgers
- Phil Smith, San Francisco
- Mike Sojourner, Utah
- Kevin Stacom, Providence
- Aron Stewart, Richmond
- Butch Taylor, Jacksonville
- Monte Towe, NC State
- Jan van Breda Kolff, Vanderbilt
- Fly Williams, Austin Peay
- Brian Winters, South Carolina

== See also ==
- 1973–74 NCAA Division I men's basketball season
