= 1974 ABA draft =

Basketball player selection

General information
- Sport: Basketball
- Dates: March 6, 1974 (Rounds 1–2); April 17, 1974 (Rounds 3–10)
- Location: New York, New York

Overview
- 100 total selections in 10 rounds
- League: American Basketball Association
- Teams: 10
- First selection: Tom McMillen, Virginia Squires

The 1974 ABA draft was the eighth draft done by the American Basketball Association (ABA), a rivaling professional basketball league to the National Basketball Association (NBA) that they would eventually merge as a part of the NBA only a couple of years later despite official merger talks ultimately being dead during the later, more competitive years of the ABA's history due to the ABA being more competitive in stealing away the NBA's talents by this time. Following the mixed results of the previous season's draft period (which saw four different drafts take place for the ABA from the months of January to May 1973), the ABA would end up returning to a more simplified draft process once again, with this year's main draft lasting for only 10 rounds for 100 draft picks instead of 29 overall rounds for 212 total picks. With that in mind, this draft would begin its first two rounds on March 6 that year before finishing the rest of that draft on April 17 out in the league's headquarters in New York. This draft was also the only draft where the ABA made the bold move of utilizing a draft that allowed them to select players that were already on NBA teams in what was dubbed the "ABA Draft of NBA Players" after the actual ABA draft finished things up properly, which confused reporters and fans on what they should make of that specific draft afterward. This draft was notable for the third round selection of Petersburg High School senior Moses Malone from Virginia, who not only became the first high school senior to be selected in a modern-era basketball draft since Reggie Harding in the 1962 NBA draft (albeit as a college preparatory student that couldn't immediately play in the NBA despite his lack of options), but also became such a major success as the first high school senior to play professional basketball to the point of allowing not just another high school senior to be selected in the following year's ABA draft with Bill Willoughby, but also allowed the NBA to select high school players in future years as well (most notably in 1975 for their own draft alongside during the late 1990s and early 2000s as well as high school postgraduate students in the late 2010s). It also became the final draft for the Denver Rockets where they participated under that name before they rebranded themselves into the modern-era Denver Nuggets franchise that we know to this day out in the NBA (thus becoming the final surviving ABA team to rebrand themselves while in the ABA), as well as the final draft for both the Memphis Tams and Carolina Cougars under those respective names with the Tams rebranding themselves to the more popularly named Memphis Sounds and the Cougars moving from the state of North Carolina to St. Louis, Missouri to become the uniquely named Spirits of St. Louis.

== Draftee career notes ==
The Virginia Squires decided to select Tom McMillen from the University of Maryland as their #1 draft pick choice instead of future Hall of Famer Bill Walton, who not only was the #1 pick of the 1974 NBA draft, but was not selected by the ABA at all this time around after being scorned by the ABA twice beforehand by the Dallas Chaparrals (now San Antonio Spurs) in 1972 and the San Diego Conquistadors in 1973. However, instead of opting to play for the ABA or even the NBA, McMillen decided to first travel abroad out to Europe in order to attend and play for both Oxford University's men's basketball team with his Rhodes Scholarship and Italy's Virtus Bologna team while travelling abroad for a year before later playing for the NBA, starting with the Buffalo Braves. McMillan later had a decent basketball career before later retiring from play in 1986 and entering the political landscape afterward, including later holding a position alongside Florence Griffith Joyner that was previously served by Arnold Schwarzenegger before him for the President's Council on Physical Fitness and Sports under Bill Clinton's first term as U.S. President. Not only that, but the ABA's other signings in the top three of their draft, Scott Wedman and Major Jones, both wound up rebuking the ABA's offers themselves to either sign up with the NBA or stay in college instead, thus dealing a greater blow to their chances of survival than they had already dealt with beforehand. However, they would still see decent success with other talented players they had selected opting to join the ABA instead, with some of them proving their worth real well early on while in the ABA before the upcoming ABA-NBA merger commenced operations. Furthermore, if one were to also include the ABA's draft involving the NBA's own players, including former ABA star player Connie Hawkins and future ABA commissioner Dave DeBusschere, the ABA would see 17 total players from that specific draft alone get involved into the Naismith Basketball Hall of Fame, even though none of them would ultimately move from the NBA to the ABA as players because of that particular draft. Not only that, but Denver Nuggets legend Alex English would also end up in the Basketball Hall of Fame alongside being a part of the NBA 75th Anniversary Team and having his #2 be retired by the Nuggets despite never playing for the team while in the ABA, but instead playing his entire professional career out in the NBA.

Out of 92 overall ABA All-Stars, seven overall players who were considered draft eligible for this year would make it to either the 1975 or 1976 ABA All-Star Game, with one player in particular making it to both games in question; that player in question was former #106 1973 undergraduate draft pick Marvin Barnes, who made it to the ABA All-Time Team with those spots alongside his ABA Rookie of the Year Award and both All-ABA Rookie Team and All-ABA Second Team spots in his rookie season despite going undrafted this year. Two other players that went undrafted this year because they were already drafted in the previous year's "Special Circumstances Draft" and undergraduate draft were former #11 pick Bobby Jones and former #110 pick Maurice Lucas, who both made it to the ABA All-Star Game in 1976 (though Lucas and Jones would technically make it to the 1976 ABA All-Star Game under unique circumstances on their ends), but Lucas was the player that made it to the ABA All-Time Team alongside Barnes, while Jones would only make it to the Hall of Fame while also being a member of the All-ABA Second Team in his final season in the ABA, as well as be a member of the All-ABA Rookie Team in his first season and be a two-time All-ABA Defensive Team member (joining Mike Gale, Julius Keye, Fatty Taylor, Willie Wise, Don Buse, and Brian Taylor as the only players to enter that team two times, with Jones being the only player to enter it during his rookie season). In terms of players actually selected during this year's draft, the #6 pick of this year's draft, Billy Knight, would make it to both the ABA All-Star Game and All-ABA First-Team during the league's final season of play after previously being a member of the All-ABA Rookie Team a season earlier. Meanwhile, the #19 pick of this year's draft, Gus Gerard would also be named an ABA All-Star in 1976 after being named a member of the All-ABA Rookie Team a year earlier, while the #67 pick of the draft, Jimmy Foster, would only technically be considered an ABA All-Star due to him playing for the Denver Nuggets at the time in 1976 due to the unique circumstances involved with that particular All-Star Game. However, the biggest impact selection of the ABA draft for this year would have to go to the #22 pick of this draft, Moses Malone from Petersburg High School in Virginia, who not only made it to the ABA All-Star Game in his rookie season and became a part of the ABA All-Rookie Team (which would help get him into the ABA All-Time Team), but he would also leave a great impact upon the NBA to the point where he would have two different numbers retired by both the Houston Rockets and Philadelphia 76ers (the latter helping win the 1983 NBA Finals alongside fellow ABA legend Julius Erving and being named the NBA Finals MVP alongside the actual MVP winner and being a part of the NBA's All-Defensive First Team that same year), be a part of both the 50 Greatest Players in NBA History and NBA 75th Anniversary Team, and be second behind Julius Erving among all ABA players when combining all-time ABA and NBA scoring totals in order to be named a member of the Naismith Basketball Hall of Fame. This draft was also notable for the selection of Mike Sylvester as the 97th pick of the 1974 draft; Sylvester became the only American-born player to win any Olympic medal in the 1980 Summer Olympics in Moscow back when the area was ruled under the Soviet Union thanks to the United States of America's involvement in the 1980 Summer Olympics boycott via the Soviet Union's invasion of Afghanistan due to him using dual citizenship to play for Italy that year, with Sylvester later winning the silver medal due to Italy upsetting the host nation in a key match in the tournament, but ultimately losing to Yugoslavia in the gold medal game.

== Historic draft notes ==
Following the mixed results of the previous year's multiple draft formats in mind, the ABA decided to return to a more simplified draft format similar to that of the NBA draft model at the time, with the worst team having first access to the top talents of the draft in each round and the rest of the teams going from reverse order until the best team that season in terms of records takes whoever's left over for that specific round, though with the second-worst team swapping positions with the worst team in each subsequent round afterward in order to have a sense of uniqueness to their draft. However, instead of doing a really long number of rounds and selections for their draft in question like 29 rounds for 212 total picks stretched out for multiple months on end, the ABA decided to simplify the number of rounds and overall selections down to just 10 total rounds (similar to what the 1967 and 1969 ABA drafts had) for only 100 overall selections at hand for the 10 teams in the league. That being said, once the initial draft of theirs concluded, the ABA would immediately start up what was considered the "ABA Draft of NBA Players", which was a five round draft for the ten ABA teams to select various NBA players (regardless of whether they were considered stars or not) that they wanted to try and sign up for a chance at persuading the players on those NBA teams to leave them for the upstart ABA teams that drafted them instead; not only were media outlets and fans confused by the draft that was going on and not sure what to make of the ABA's draft situation at hand there, but the ABA's unique draft attempt to steal away the NBA's own players ultimately failed miserably on their end since none of the players they drafted really left the NBA to sign up with the teams that drafted them from that particular draft at hand. Following these draft days' conclusions, the Carolina Cougars would move from the state of North Carolina (thus all but effectively killing off the idea of a regional team surviving in the ABA before the NBA-ABA merger eventually occurred due to the Virginia Squires being the only regional team left in play after the experiment first began in 1970) to St. Louis, Missouri to become the uniquely named Spirits of St. Louis franchise, the Memphis Tams would officially rebrand themselves as the much more popularly named Memphis Sounds for what would later become their final season in Memphis, and the Denver Rockets would officially rebrand themselves into the Denver Nuggets (partially as a homage to the former Denver Nuggets NBL & NBA team that played in both the 1948–49 NBL season and 1949–50 NBA season, but mainly was done as the winning entry in their "Name That Team" contest in their future precautionary move into the NBA later on) in order to make their personal transition into the NBA a lot easier on their end due to the NBA already having a team named the Rockets around via the Houston Rockets (formerly known as the San Diego Rockets) that existed around the same period of time as the Denver franchise back when Denver's franchise had the Rockets name originally for the purpose of advertising another business from previous ownership by the Ringsby Rocket Truck Lines company at the time after previously thinking of going by the team names of Larks and Lark Buntings at one point in time (with this Nuggets team still existing to this very day).

== Key ==
Pos.	G	F	C
Position	Guard	Forward	Center

Accomplishments key
Symbol	Meaning	Symbol	Meaning
^	Denotes player who has been inducted to the Naismith Memorial Basketball Hall of Fame	‡	Denotes player that was selected to the ABA All-Time Team
*	Denotes player who has been selected for at least one All-Star Game and All-ABA Team	+	Denotes player who has been selected for at least one All-Star Game
~	Denotes a player that won the ABA Rookie of the Year Award	#	Denotes player who has never appeared in either an ABA or NBA regular season or playoff game

== Draft ==
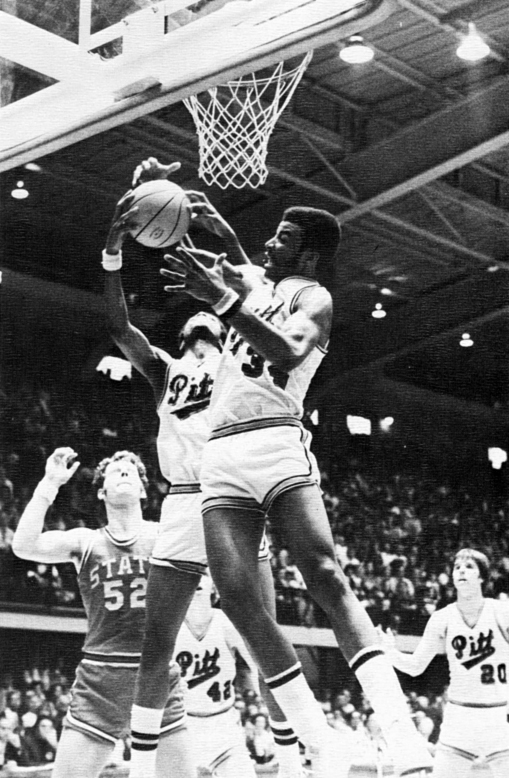
Billy Knight (upfront) was the sixth pick of the 1974 ABA Draft by the Indiana Pacers.

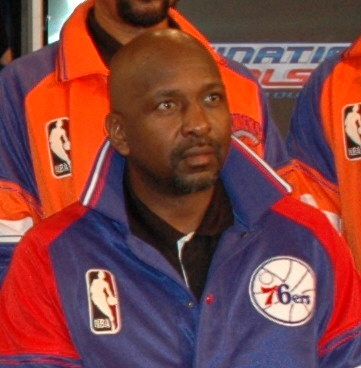
Moses Malone was the 22nd pick of the 1974 ABA Draft by the Utah Stars via trading with the Virginia Squires.

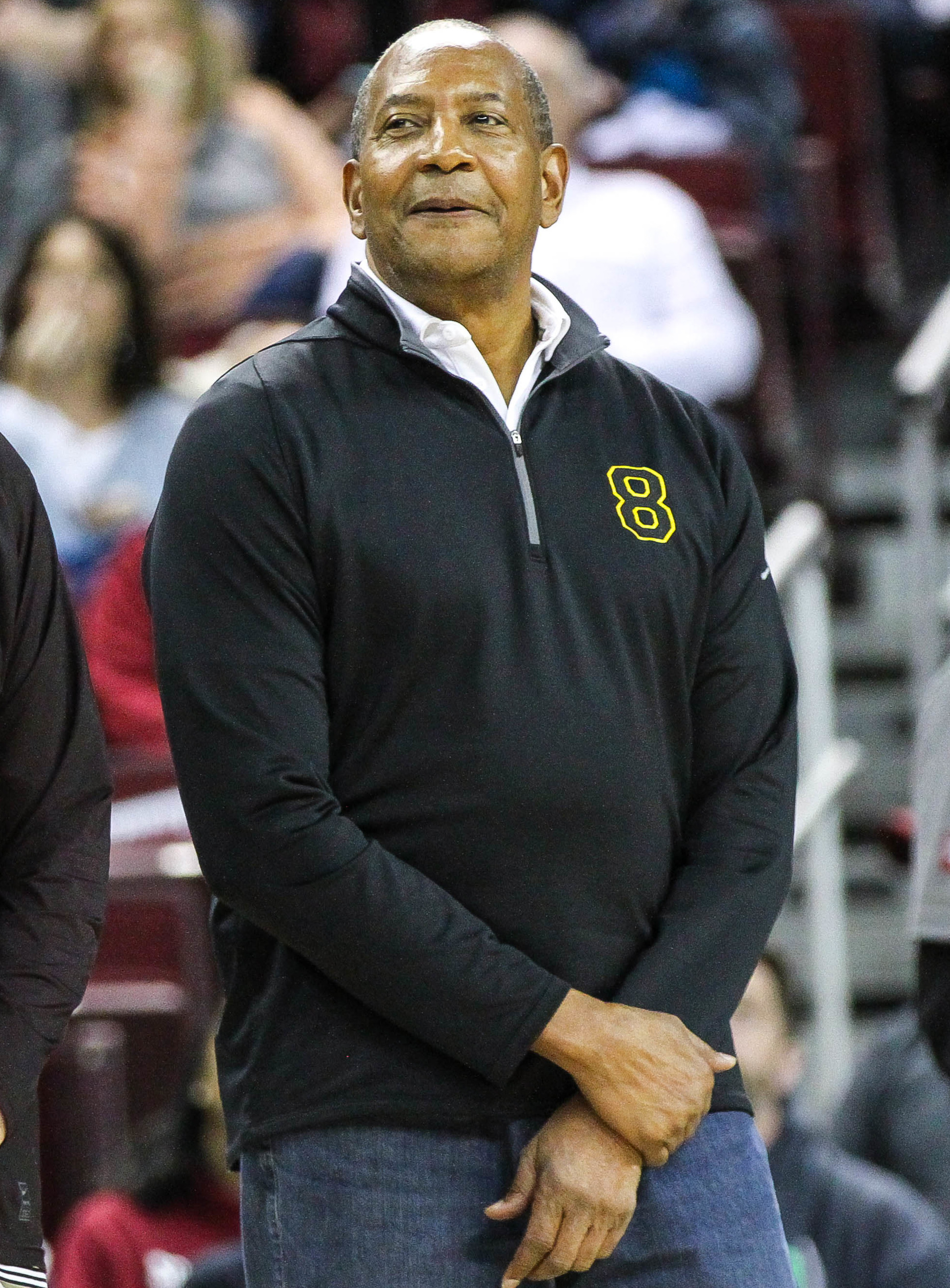
Alex English was the 66th pick of the 1974 ABA Draft by the Indiana Pacers.

Round	Pick	Player	Pos.	Nationality	Team	School
1	1	Tom McMillen	PF/C	United States	Virginia Squires	Maryland (Sr.)
1	2	Scott Wedman	SF	United States	Memphis Tams	Colorado (Sr.)
1	3	Major Jones	PF	United States	San Diego Conquistadors	Albany State (So.)
1	4	Fly Williams	SG	United States	Denver Rockets	Austin Peay (So.)
1	5	Jan van Breda Kolff	SF	United States	Virginia Squires (from San Antonio)	Vanderbilt (Sr.)
1	6	Billy Knight*	SG/SF	United States	Indiana Pacers	Pittsburgh (Sr.)
1	7	John Lucas II	PG	United States	Carolina Cougars	Maryland (So.)
1	8	Cliff Pondexter	PF	United States	San Diego Conquistadors (from Kentucky)	Long Beach State (Fr.)
1	9	Brian Winters	PG/SG	United States	New York Nets	South Carolina (Sr.)
1	10	Joe C. Meriweather	C/PF	United States	Utah Stars	Southern Illinois (Jr.)
2	11	Foots Walker	PG	United States	Memphis Tams	West Georgia (Sr.)
2	12	Jesse Dark	SG	United States	Virginia Squires	VCU (Sr.)
2	13	Gus Bailey	SG/SF	United States	San Diego Conquistadors	UTEP (Sr.)
2	14	Frank Kendrick	SF	United States	Denver Rockets	Purdue (Sr.)
2	15	Truck Robinson	PF	United States	San Antonio Spurs	Tennessee State (Sr.)
2	16	Bruce King^{#}	G	United States	Indiana Pacers	Pan American (Sr.)
2	17	Rich Kelley	C/PF	United States	New York Nets (from Carolina)	Stanford (Jr.)
2	18	Al Eberhard	SF	United States	Kentucky Colonels	Missouri (Sr.)
2	19	Gus Gerard^{+}	SF	United States	Carolina Cougars (from New York)	Virginia (Jr.)
2	20	Len Kosmalski	C	United States	Utah Stars	Tennessee (Sr.)
3	21	Bobby Wilson	SG	United States	Memphis Tams	Wichita State (Sr.)
3	22	Moses Malone^‡	C	United States	Utah Stars (from Virginia)	Petersburg HS (Virginia) (HS Sr.)
3	23	Mike Sojourner	C/PF	United States	Denver Rockets	Utah (Jr.)
3	24	Lionel Billingy	PF	United States	Virginia Squires (from San Diego)	Duquesne (Sr.)
3	25	Aaron Jones^{#}	PF	United States	Utah Stars (from San Antonio)	Grambling State (Sr.)
3	26	Roland Grant^{#}	C	United States	Indiana Pacers	New Mexico State (Sr.)
3	27	Tom Barker	C/PF	United States	Utah Stars (from Carolina)	College of Southern Idaho (So.)
3	28	Sammy High^{#}	F	United States	Kentucky Colonels (from Utah)	Tulsa (Sr.)
3	29	Collis Temple	SF	United States	San Antonio Spurs (from Kentucky)	LSU (Sr.)
3	30	Tom Boswell	PF/C	United States	New York Nets	South Carolina (Jr.)
4	31	Glenn McDonald	SG/SF	United States	Memphis Tams	Long Beach State (Sr.)
4	32	Lerman Battle^{#}	F	United States	Virginia Squires	Fairmont State (Sr.)
4	33	Richie O'Connor^{#}	G	United States	San Diego Conquistadors	Fairfield (Sr.)
4	34	Coniel Norman	SG	United States	Denver Rockets	Arizona (So.)
4	35	Fred Saunders	SF/PF	United States	San Antonio Spurs	Syracuse (Sr.)
4	36	Kim Hughes	C	United States	San Antonio Spurs (from Indiana)	Wisconsin (Sr.)
4	37	Darrell Elston	SG	United States	Carolina Cougars	North Carolina (Sr.)
4	38	Sam McCants^{#}	G	United States	Utah Stars	Oral Roberts (Jr.)
4	39	Lloyd Batts	SG/SF	United States	Kentucky Colonels	Cincinnati (Sr.)
4	40	Talvin Skinner	SF	United States	New York Nets	Maryland Eastern Shore (Sr.)
5	41	Tyrone Medley^{#}	G	United States	Memphis Tams	Utah (Sr.)
5	42	Bernard Harris^{#}	C	United States	Virginia Squires	VCU (Sr.)
5	43	Bernard Hardin^{#}	F	United States	Denver Rockets	New Mexico (Sr.)
5	44	Greg Lee	PG	United States	San Diego Conquistadors	UCLA (Sr.)
5	45	Gene Short	SF	United States	San Antonio Spurs	Jackson State (So.)
5	46	Eddie Woods^{#}	C	United States	Indiana Pacers	Oral Roberts (Sr.)
5	47	Mickey Johnson	PF	United States	Carolina Cougars	Aurora College (Sr.)
5	48	Steve Brooks^{#}	C	United States	Utah Stars	Arkansas State (Sr.)
5	49	Seymour Reed^{#}	F	United States	Kentucky Colonels	Bradley (Sr.)
5	50	Eric Fernsten	C/PF	United States	New York Nets	San Francisco (Jr.)
6	51	Wolfgang Fengler^{#}	C/PF	United States	Memphis Tams	Delaware (Sr.)
6	52	Phil Lumpkin	PG	United States	Virginia Squires	Miami (OH) (Sr.)
6	53	Richard Wallace^{#}	G	United States	San Diego Conquistadors	Georgia Southern (Sr.)
6	54	Luther Burden	SG	United States	Denver Rockets	Utah (So.)
6	55	Gary Anderson^{#}	G	United States	San Antonio Spurs	Wisconsin (Sr.)
6	56	Ron deVries^{#}	C	United States	Indiana Pacers	Illinois State (Sr.)
6	57	Gary Novak^{#}	F	United States	Carolina Cougars	Notre Dame (Sr.)
6	58	Harvey Catchings	PF/C	United States	Carolina Cougars (from Utah)	Hardin–Simmons (Sr.)
6	59	Bill Ligon	G	United States	Kentucky Colonels	Vanderbilt (Sr.)
6	60	Gary Brokaw	G	United States	New York Nets	Notre Dame (Jr.)
7	61	Lawrence Johnson^{#}	F	United States	Memphis Tams	Prairie View A&M (Sr.)
7	62	Earl Williams	C	United States; Israel	Virginia Squires	Winston-Salem State (Sr.)
7	63	Eric Money	PG	United States	Denver Rockets	Arizona (Jr.)
7	64	Leon Benbow	SG	United States	San Diego Conquistadors	Jacksonville (Sr.)
7	65	Gerald Cunningham^{#}	F	United States	San Antonio Spurs	Kentucky State (Fr.)
7	66	Alex English^	SF	United States	Indiana Pacers	South Carolina (So.)
7	67	Jimmy Foster^{+}	PG	United States	Carolina Cougars	Connecticut (Sr.)
7	68	Ron Lee	PG	United States	Utah Stars	Oregon (So.)
7	69	Bill Butler^{#}	G	United States	Kentucky Colonels	Louisville (Sr.)
7	70	Dean Tolson	PF	United States	New York Nets	Arkansas (Sr.)
8	71	Willie Biles^{#}	G	United States	Memphis Tams	Tulsa (Sr.)
8	72	John Drew	SF	United States	Virginia Squires	Gardner–Webb (So.)
8	73	Daniel Anderson	PG	United States	San Diego Conquistadors	USC (Sr.)
8	74	Larry Fogle	SG	United States	Denver Rockets	Canisius (So.)
8	75	Hercle Ivy^{#}	G	United States	San Antonio Spurs	Iowa State (Sr.)
8	76	Bob Florence^{#}	G	United States	Indiana Pacers	UNLV (Sr.)
8	77	Thomas L. Kivisto^{#}	PG	United States	Carolina Cougars	Kansas (Sr.)
8	78	Ed Palubinskas^{#}	G	Australia	Utah Stars	LSU (Sr.)
8	79	Leonard Coulter^{#}	F	United States	Kentucky Colonels	Morehead State (Sr.)
8	80	Al Skinner	SG	United States	New York Nets	Massachusetts (Sr.)
9	81	Ron Brown^{#}	G	United States	Memphis Tams	Penn State (Sr.)
9	82	Bill Campion^{#}	C	United States	Virginia Squires	Manhattan (Jr.)
9	83	Tony Byers^{#}	G	United States	Denver Rockets	Wake Forest (Sr.)
9	84	Stan Washington	PG	United States	San Diego Conquistadors	San Diego (Sr.)
9	85	Walter Luckett^{#}	SG	United States	San Antonio Spurs	Ohio (So.)
9	86	Kevin Fitzgerald^{#}	G	United States	Indiana Pacers	Oklahoma State (Sr.)
9	87	Marcus Washington^{#}	G	United States	Carolina Cougars	Marquette (Sr.)
9	88	Glenn Hansen	SG	United States	Utah Stars	LSU (Jr.)
9	89	Lionel Hollins	PG	United States	Kentucky Colonels	Arizona State (Jr.)
9	90	Bob Fleischer^{#}	F	United States	New York Nets	Duke (Jr.)
10	91	Candy LaPrince^{#}	PG	United States	Memphis Tams	Iowa (Sr.)
10	92	Mark Cartwright^{#}	C	United States	Virginia Squires	Bowling Green (Jr.)
10	93	Marques Johnson	SF	United States	San Diego Conquistadors	UCLA (Fr.)
10	94	Roscoe Pondexter^{#}	F	United States	Denver Rockets	Long Beach State (Jr.)
10	95	Charles McKinney^{#}	C	United States	San Antonio Spurs	Baylor (Sr.)
10	96	Mark Brown^{#}	F	United States	Indiana Pacers	Missouri Western State (Sr.)
10	97	Mike Sylvester^{#}	F	United States; Italy	Carolina Cougars	Dayton (Sr.)
10	98	Mike Westra^{#}	F	United States	Utah Stars	USC (Sr.)
10	99	Steve Walker^{#}	G	United States	Kentucky Colonels	Kentucky Wesleyan (Sr.)
10	100	Mike Ogan^{#}	C	United States	San Antonio Spurs (from New York)	Carson–Newman (Sr.)

=== Notable undrafted players ===
These players were officially considered draft eligible for the 1974 ABA draft and went undrafted this year, yet played at least one regular season or playoff game for the ABA before the ABA-NBA merger commenced two years later.

Player	Pos.	Nationality	School/Club team
Clyde Dickey	SG	United States	Boise State (Sr.)
Bill Higgins	SG	United States	Ashland (Jr.)
Aulcie Perry	C	United States; Israel	Bethune–Cookman (Sr.)
Dennis Van Zant	PF	United States	Azusa Pacific (Sr.)
Donald Washington	SF	United States	Geneva (Switzerland)
Hank Williams	SF	United States	Jacksonville (Jr.)

=== 1974 ABA draft of NBA players ===
This draft was done with the intention of trying to have the ABA's teams go ahead and sign up some of the NBA's own players onto their own teams instead of remaining onto their NBA teams properly. However, none of the NBA's players would go ahead and sign up with the ABA teams that drafted them there, partially due to the media's general confusion on what to make of this specific drafting event. At most, a few of those players would join up with some of those ABA teams later on either in the ABA or the NBA instead, but not directly upon entering the 1974–75 ABA season. A couple of these players that were drafted by the ABA would actually later retire from professional play before the upcoming season began as well, with one of these players in particular (Dave DeBusschere) later becoming the final commissioner in the history of the ABA. Interestingly, at least three players drafted here (Bob Christian, George E. Johnson, and Connie Hawkins) had also previously played in the ABA while being drafted by that league earlier on before being selected here in this draft as well, with one of them doing so due to them previously being banned from playing in the NBA at the time. Regardless, all of the ABA's failures relating to this particular draft combined with their compounding financial issues behind the scenes led to the ABA not implementing this kind of draft again for what would become the league's final draft year in the following year of 1975.

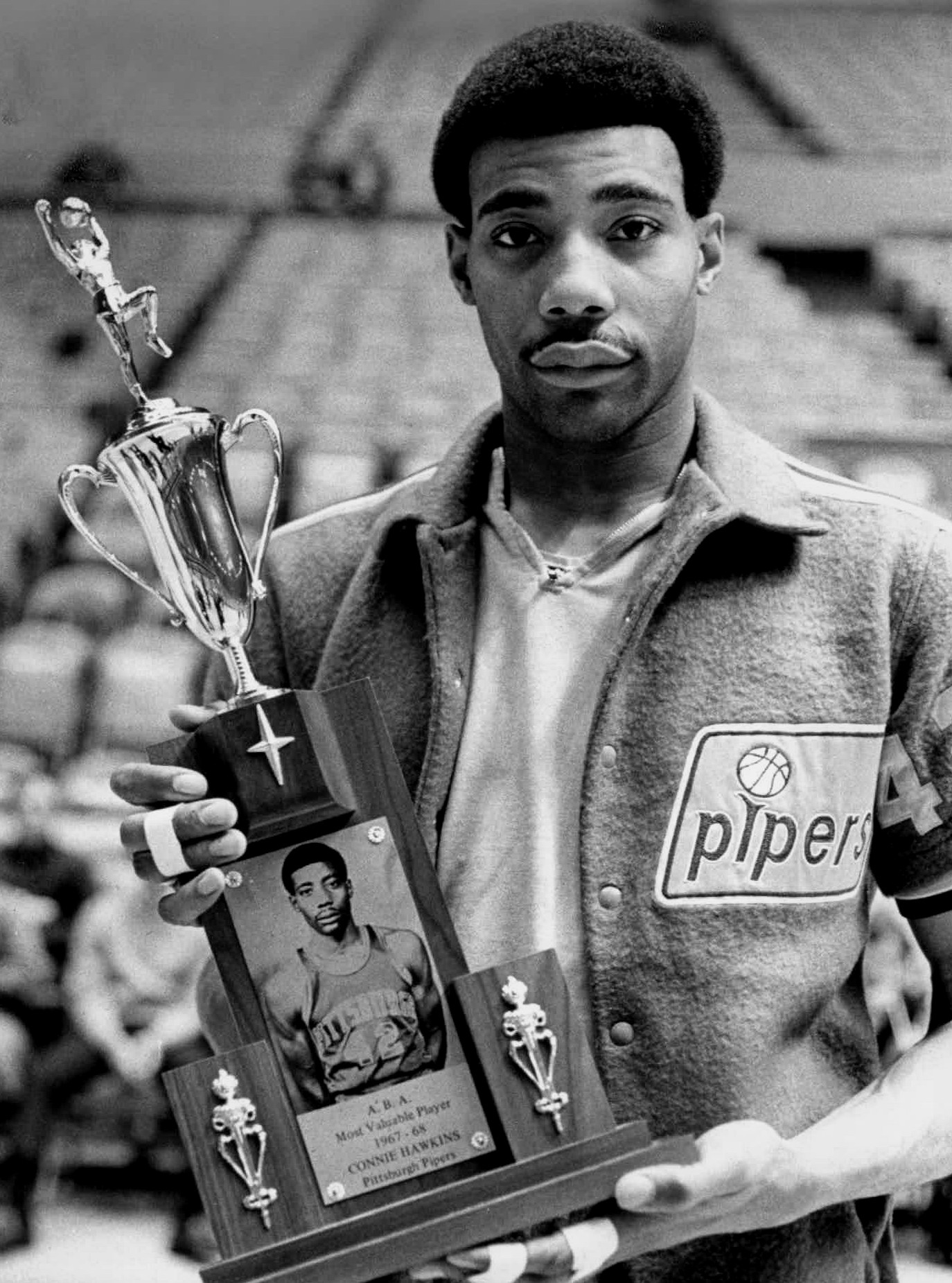
Connie Hawkins (who previously played in the ABA as an MVP-caliber player for the Pittsburgh / Minnesota Pipers early on in the ABA) was selected as the 44th pick of the 1974 ABA draft of NBA players by the San Diego Conquistadors as an attempt to lure him back into the ABA again.

Rnd.	Pick	Player	Pos.	Nationality (Note: Nationality indicates the player's national team or representative nationality. If a player has not competed at the international level, then the nationality indicates the national team which the player is eligible to represent according to FIBA rules.)	ABA Team	NBA Team
1	1	Bob Kauffman	PF/C	United States	Virginia Squires	Buffalo Braves
1	2	Rick Roberson	PF/C	United States	Memphis Tams	Portland Trail Blazers
1	3	Nate Thurmond^	C/PF	United States	Denver Rockets	Golden State Warriors
1	4	Cazzie Russell	SF	United States	San Diego Conquistadors	Golden State Warriors
1	5	Tom Boerwinkle	C	United States	San Antonio Spurs	Chicago Bulls
1	6	Clifford Ray	C/PF	United States	Indiana Pacers	Chicago Bulls
1	7	Pete Maravich^	SG	United States	Carolina Cougars	Atlanta Hawks
1	8	Bob Christian	C	United States	Utah Stars	Phoenix Suns
1	9	Jim Price	PG	United States	Kentucky Colonels	Los Angeles Lakers
1	10	Phil Chenier	SG	United States	New York Nets	Capital Bullets
2	11	Norm Van Lier	PG	United States	Memphis Tams	Chicago Bulls
2	12	George E. Johnson	C	United States	Virginia Squires	Golden State Warriors
2	13	Sidney Wicks	PF	United States	San Diego Conquistadors	Portland Trail Blazers
2	14	Tom Van Arsdale	SG/SF	United States	Denver Rockets	Philadelphia 76ers
2	15	Clyde Lee	PF/C	United States	San Antonio Spurs	Golden State Warriors
2	16	Bill Bradley^	SF	United States	Indiana Pacers	New York Knicks
2	17	Henry Bibby	PG	United States	Carolina Cougars	New York Knicks
2	18	Geoff Petrie	PG/SG	United States	Utah Stars	Portland Trail Blazers
2	19	Greg Smith	PF/SF	United States	Kentucky Colonels	Portland Trail Blazers
2	20	Dave Cowens^	C	United States	New York Nets	Boston Celtics
3	21	Dick Snyder	SF/SG	United States	Virginia Squires	Seattle SuperSonics
3	22	Lenny Wilkens^	PG	United States	Memphis Tams	Cleveland Cavaliers
3	23	Don Adams	SF	United States	Denver Rockets	Detroit Pistons
3	24	Curtis Rowe	PF	United States	San Diego Conquistadors	Detroit Pistons
3	25	Neal Walk	C	United States	San Antonio Spurs	Phoenix Suns
3	26	Mel Counts	C/PF	United States	Indiana Pacers	Los Angeles Lakers
3	27	Phil Jackson^	PF	United States	Carolina Cougars	New York Knicks
3	28	Howard Porter	PF/SF	United States	Utah Stars	Chicago Bulls
3	29	Rowland Garrett	SF	United States	Kentucky Colonels	Chicago Bulls
3	30	Jerry Sloan^	SG	United States	New York Nets	Chicago Bulls
4	31	Paul Silas	PF	United States	Memphis Tams	Boston Celtics
4	32	Calvin Murphy^	PG	United States	Virginia Squires	Houston Rockets
4	33	Gail Goodrich^	SG	United States	San Diego Conquistadors	Los Angeles Lakers
4	34	Rick Adelman^	PG	United States	Denver Rockets	Chicago Bulls
4	35	Steve Kuberski	PF/C	United States	San Antonio Spurs	Boston Celtics
4	36	Pat Riley^	SG	United States	Indiana Pacers	Los Angeles Lakers
4	37	Paul Westphal^	SG/PG	United States	Carolina Cougars	Boston Celtics
4	38	Rudy Tomjanovich^	PF	United States	Utah Stars	Houston Rockets
4	39	Herm Gilliam	SG/PG	United States	Kentucky Colonels	Atlanta Hawks
4	40	Jim Fox	PF/C	United States	New York Nets	Seattle SuperSonics
5	41	Barry Clemens	PF	United States	Virginia Squires	Cleveland Cavaliers
5	42	Dave DeBusschere^	PF/SF	United States	Memphis Tams	New York Knicks
5	43	Lou Hudson^	SG/SF	United States	Denver Rockets	Atlanta Hawks
5	44	Connie Hawkins^‡	PF/C	United States	San Diego Conquistadors	Los Angeles Lakers
5	45	Lloyd Neal	C/PF	United States	San Antonio Spurs	Portland Trail Blazers
5	46	Jim Davis	PF/C	United States	Indiana Pacers	Detroit Pistons
5	47	Jeff Mullins	SG	United States	Carolina Cougars	Golden State Warriors
5	48	Bob McAdoo^	C	United States	Utah Stars	Buffalo Braves
5	49	Larry Steele	G	United States	Kentucky Colonels	Portland Trail Blazers
5	50	Gar Heard	PF	United States	New York Nets	Buffalo Braves
