= California Mr. Basketball =

Honor awarded to high school basketball players

Each year the California Mr. Basketball award is presented to the top high school boys' basketball player in California. The award has been presented since 1905. Voting is done in a points system. Each voter selects first, second, and third place votes. A player receives five points for each first-place vote, three points for each second-place vote, and one point for a third-place vote. The player who garners the most points receives the award.

== Award winners ==
Year	Player	High school	College	NBA draft
2026	Jason Crowe Jr.	Inglewood High School, Inglewood	Missouri	
2025	Brayden Burries	Eleanor Roosevelt, Eastvale	Arizona	2026 NBA draft: 1st round, 10th overall by the Milwaukee Bucks
2024	Trent Perry	Harvard-Westlake School, Studio City	UCLA	
2023	Jared McCain	Corona Centennial, Corona	Duke	2024 NBA draft: 1st round, 16th overall by the Philadelphia 76ers
2022	Donovan Dent	Centennial High School, Corona	New Mexico / UCLA / LSU	
2021	Amari Bailey	Sierra Canyon School, Chatsworth	UCLA	2023 NBA draft: 2nd round, 41st overall by the Charlotte Hornets
2020	Brandon Boston Jr.	Sierra Canyon School, Chatsworth	Kentucky	2021 NBA draft: 2nd round, 51st overall by the Memphis Grizzlies
2019	Onyeka Okongwu (2)	Chino Hills High School, Chino Hills	USC	2020 NBA draft: 1st round, 6th overall by the Atlanta Hawks
2018	Onyeka Okongwu	Chino Hills High School, Chino Hills	USC	2020 NBA draft: 1st round, 6th overall by the Atlanta Hawks
2017	Ethan Thompson	Bishop Montgomery High School, Torrance	Oregon State	
2016	Lonzo Ball	Chino Hills High School	UCLA	2017 NBA draft: 1st round, 2nd overall by the Los Angeles Lakers
2015	Ivan Rabb	Bishop O'Dowd High School, Oakland	University of California, Berkeley	2017 NBA draft: 2nd round, 35th overall by the Orlando Magic
2014	Stanley Johnson	Mater Dei High School, Santa Ana	Arizona	2015 NBA draft: 1st round, 8th overall by the Detroit Pistons
2013	Aaron Gordon (2)	Archbishop Mitty High School, San Jose	Arizona	2014 NBA draft: 1st round, 4th overall by the Orlando Magic
2012	Aaron Gordon	Archbishop Mitty High School, San Jose	Arizona	2014 NBA draft: 1st round, 4th overall by the Orlando Magic
2011	Ryan Anderson	Long Beach Poly, Long Beach	Boston College / Arizona	
2010	Allen Crabbe	Frederick K.C. Price III Christian Schools, Los Angeles	California	2013 NBA draft: 2nd round, 31st overall by the Cleveland Cavaliers
2009	Kawhi Leonard	Martin Luther King High School, Riverside	San Diego State	2011 NBA draft: 1st round, 15th overall by the Indiana Pacers
2008	Jrue Holiday	Campbell Hall School, Studio City	UCLA	2009 NBA draft: 1st Rnd, 17th overall by the Philadelphia 76ers
2007	Taylor King	Mater Dei High School, Santa Ana	Duke / Villanova / Concordia	
2006	Chase Budinger	La Costa Canyon High School, Carlsbad	Arizona	2009 NBA draft: 2nd Rnd, 44th overall by the Detroit Pistons
2005	Amir Johnson	Westchester High School, Los Angeles	None	2005 NBA draft: 2nd Rnd, 56th overall by the Detroit Pistons
2004	DeMarcus Nelson	Sheldon High School, Sacramento	Duke	2008 NBA draft: Undrafted, signed as a free agent by the Golden State Warriors
2003	Trevor Ariza	Westchester High School, Los Angeles	UCLA	2004 NBA draft: 2nd Rnd, 43rd overall by the New York Knicks
2002	Hassan Adams	Westchester High School, Los Angeles	Arizona	2006 NBA draft: 2nd round, 54th overall by the New Jersey Nets
2001	Tyson Chandler (2)	Dominguez High School, Compton	None	2001 NBA draft: first round, 2nd overall by the Los Angeles Clippers
2000	Tyson Chandler	Dominguez High School, Compton	None	2001 NBA draft: 1st round, 2nd overall by the Clippers
1999	Casey Jacobsen	Glendora High School, Glendora	Stanford	2002 NBA draft: 1st round, 22nd overall by the Phoenix Suns
1998	Tayshaun Prince	Dominguez High School, Compton	Kentucky	2002 NBA draft: 1st Rnd, 23rd overall by the Detroit Pistons
1997	Baron Davis	Crossroads Schools, Santa Monica	UCLA	1999 NBA draft: 1st round, 3rd overall by the Charlotte Hornets
1996	Corey Benjamin	Fontana High School, Fontana	Oregon State	1998 NBA draft: 1st round, 28th overall by the Chicago Bulls
1995	Paul Pierce	Inglewood High School, Inglewood	Kansas	1998 NBA draft: 1st Rnd, 10th overall by the Boston Celtics
1994	Jelani Gardner	St. John Bosco High School, Bellflower	California / Pepperdine	
1993	Charles O'Bannon	Artesia High School, Lakewood	UCLA	1997 NBA draft: 2nd Rnd, 32nd overall by the Detroit Pistons
1992	Jason Kidd (2)	St. Joseph Notre Dame High School, Alameda	California	1994 NBA draft: 1st Rnd, 2nd overall by the Dallas Mavericks
1991	Jason Kidd	St. Joseph Notre Dame High School, Alameda	California	1994 NBA draft: 1st Rnd, 2nd overall by the Dallas Mavericks
1990	Ed O'Bannon	Artesia High School, Lakewood	UCLA	1995 NBA draft: 1st Rnd, 9th overall by the New Jersey Nets
1989	Tracy Murray	Glendora High School, Glendora	UCLA	1992 NBA draft: 1st Rnd, 18th overall by the San Antonio Spurs
1988	Chris Mills	Fairfax High School	Kentucky / Arizona	1993 NBA draft: 1st Rnd, 22nd overall by the Cleveland Cavaliers
1987	LeRon Ellis	Mater Dei High School, Santa Ana	Kentucky / Syracuse	1991 NBA draft: 1st Rnd, 22nd overall by the Clippers
1986	Scott Williams	Glen A. Wilson High School, Hacienda Heights	North Carolina	
1985	Tom Lewis	Mater Dei High School, Santa Ana	USC / Pepperdine	
1984	John Williams (2)	Crenshaw High School, Los Angeles	LSU	1986 NBA draft: 1st Rnd, 12th overall by the Washington Bullets
1983	John Williams	Crenshaw High School, Los Angeles	LSU	1986 NBA draft: 1st Rnd, 12th overall by the Washington Bullets
1982	Tony Jackson	Bishop O'Dowd High School, Oakland	DePaul	
1981	Dwayne Polee	Manual Arts High School,	UNLV / Pepperdine	1986 NBA draft: 3rd Rnd, 54th overall by the Los Angeles Clippers
1980	Ralph Jackson	Inglewood High School, Inglewood	UCLA	1984 NBA draft: 4th Rnd, 71st overall by the Indiana Pacers
1979	Darren Daye	John F. Kennedy High School, Los Angeles	UCLA	1983 NBA draft: 3rd Rnd, 57th overall by the Washington Bullets
1978	Greg Goorjian	Crescenta Valley High School, La Crescenta-Montrose	Arizona State / UNLV / Loyola Marymount	
1977	Cliff Robinson	Castlemont High School, Oakland	USC	1979 NBA draft: 1st Rnd, 11th overall by the New Jersey Nets
1976	Rich Branning	Marina High School, Huntington Beach	Notre Dame	1980 NBA draft: 4th Rnd, 78th overall by the Indiana Pacers
1975	Bill Cartwright (2)	Elk Grove High School, Elk Grove	San Francisco	1979 NBA draft: 1st Rnd, 3rd overall by the New York Knicks
1974	Bill Cartwright	Elk Grove High School, Elk Grove	San Francisco	1979 NBA draft: 1st Rnd, 3rd overall by the New York Knicks
1973	Marques Johnson	Crenshaw High School, Los Angeles	UCLA	1977 NBA draft: 1st Rnd, 3rd overall by the Milwaukee Bucks
1972	Cliff Pondexter	San Joaquin Memorial High School, Fresno	Long Beach State	1974 NBA draft: 1st Rnd, 16th overall by the Chicago Bulls
1971	Roscoe Pondexter	San Joaquin Memorial High School, Fresno	Long Beach State	1974 NBA draft: 3rd Rnd, 56th overall by the Boston Celtics
1970	Bill Walton	Helix High School, La Mesa	UCLA	1974 NBA draft: 1st Rnd, 1st overall by the Portland Trail Blazers
1969	Keith Wilkes	Ventura High School, Ventura	UCLA	1974 NBA draft: 1st Rnd, 11th overall by the Golden State Warriors
1968	Paul Westphal	Aviation High School, Redondo Beach	USC	1972 NBA draft: 1st Rnd, 10th overall by the Boston Celtics
1967	Curtis Rowe	John C. Fremont High School, Los Angeles	UCLA	1971 NBA draft: 1st Rnd, 11th overall by the Detroit Pistons
1966	Dennis Awtrey	Blackford High School, San Jose	Santa Clara	1970 NBA draft: 3rd Rnd, 12th overall by the Philadelphia 76ers
1965	Bob Portman	St. Ignatius College Preparatory, San Francisco	Creighton	1969 NBA draft: 1st Rnd, 7th overall by the San Francisco Warriors
1964	Russ Critchfield	Salinas High School, Salinas	California	
1963	Edgar Lacy	Jefferson High School, Los Angeles	UCLA	1968 NBA draft: 4th Rnd, 43rd overall by the San Francisco Warriors
1962	Joe Ellis	McClymonds High School, Oakland	San Francisco	1966 NBA draft: 2nd Rnd, 13th overall by the San Francisco Warriors
1961	Gail Goodrich	John H. Francis Polytechnic High School, Los Angeles	UCLA	1965 NBA draft: Territorial pick by the Los Angeles Lakers
1960	Paul Silas	McClymonds High School, Oakland	Creighton	1964 NBA draft: 2nd Rnd, 10th overall by the St. Louis Hawks
1959	Steve Gray	George Washington High School, San Francisco	St Mary's	1963 NBA draft: 3rd Rnd, 20th overall by the San Francisco Warriors
1958	Bill McGill	Jefferson High School, Los Angeles	Utah	1962 NBA draft: 1st Rnd, 1st overall by the Chicago Zephyrs
1957	Tom Meschery	Lowell High School, San Francisco	St. Mary's	1961 NBA draft: 1st Rnd, 7th overall by the Philadelphia Warriors
1956	Fred LaCour (2)	St. Ignatius College Preparatory, San Francisco	1960 NBA draft: 3rd Rnd, 22nd overall by the St. Louis Hawks	
1955	Fred LaCour	St. Ignatius College Preparatory, San Francisco	San Francisco	1960 NBA draft: 3rd Rnd, 22nd overall by the St. Louis Hawks
1954	Willie Davis	Alameda High School, Alameda		
1953	Bill Bond	St. Anthony High School, Long Beach	Stanford	
1952	Willie Naulls	San Pedro High School, Los Angeles	UCLA	1956 NBA draft: 2nd round, 9th overall by the St. Louis Hawks
1951	Ken Sears	Watsonville High School, Watsonville	Santa Clara	1955 NBA draft: 1st round, 4th overall by the New York Knicks
1950	Don Bragg	Galileo High School, San Francisco	UCLA	1955 NBA draft: 7th round, 54th overall by the Minneapolis Lakers
1949	Ken Flower	Lowell High School,	USC	1953 NBA draft: 4th round, 34th overall by the Minneapolis Lakers
1948	Jim Loscutoff	Palo Alto	Grant Tech / Oregon	1955 NBA draft: 1st round, 3rd overall by the Boston Celtics
1947	Bill McColl	San Diego Hoover	Stanford (only football)	(NFL)
1946	Don Lofgran	Oakland Tech	Grant Tech	1950 NBA draft: 1st round, 11th overall by the Syracuse Nationals
1945	Bob Kloppenburg	Los Angeles Marshall	USC / Fresno State	
1944	Bill Sharman	Porterville	USC	1950 NBA draft: 2nd round, 17th overall by the Washington Capitols
1943	Kevin O’Shea	St. Ignatius	Notre Dame	1950 NBA draft: 1st round, 10th overall by the Washington Capitols
1942	Andy Wolfe	Richmond	California	1948 NBA draft: 9th round, 99th overall by the Philadelphia Warriors
1941	Al Brightman	Long Beach Wilson	Long Beach State / Charleston	Signed with the Boston Celtics before a first draft
1940	Howie Dallmar	Lowell	Stanford / Penn	Signed with the Philadelphia Warriors before a first draft
1939	Jim Pollard	Oakland Tech	Stanford	1947 NBA draft: 7th round, 62nd overall by the Chicago Stags
1938	John Mandic	Los Angeles Roosevelt	Oregon State	1947 NBA draft: 9th round, 74th overall by the Washington Capitols
1937	Don Burness (2)	Lowell	Stanford	
1936	Don Burness	Lowell	Stanford	
1935	Ralph Giannini	Balboa	Santa Clara	
1934	Hank Luisetti (2)	Galileo	Stanford	
1933	Hank Luisetti	Galileo	Stanford	
1932	Richard Hay	Lowell	California	
1931	Frank Sobrero	Oakland	Santa Clara	
1930	Lee Guttero	Los Angeles Lincoln	USC	
1929	Hands Slavich	Galileo	Santa Clara	
1928	Clem Sultenfuss	Hollywood	Nevada	
1927	Dick Linthicum	Hollywood	UCLA	
1926	Jim Mears	Hollywood	Stanford	
1925	Johny Lehners	Hollywood	USC	
1924	Vern Corbin	Piedmont	California	
1923	Max Miller	Los Angeles Manual Arts		
1922	Gene Dorsey	Hollywood	USC	
1921	Ernie Nevers	Santa Rosa	Stanford	
1920	Lyle Richards	Orange		
1919	John Talt	Oakland Fremont	California	
1918	Vestal Stanley	Whittier		
1917	Stew Beam	Whittier		
1916	Bobby Don	Lowell		
1915	Dick Berndt (2)	Lowell		
1914	Dick Berndt	Lowell		
1913	Wallace Barnes	San Francisco Lowell		
1912	Bill Embury	Berkeley		
1911	Art Worthy	Huntington Beach		
1910	Chester Gilbert	San Francisco Cogswell Polytechnic		
1909	Demming MacLise	Oakland		
1908	Chester Conklin	Stockton		
1907	Merlin Jackson	Stockton		
1906	Mow Mitchell (2)	Los Angeles	Stanford (rugby; no basketball team established)	
1905	Mow Mitchell	Los Angeles	Stanford (rugby; no basketball team established )	

== Most winners by college ==
Number	Program
21	UCLA
10	USC
9	California
8	Arizona
8	Stanford
6	San Francisco
5	Santa Clara
4	Kentucky
3	Duke
3	Oregon State
3	Pepperdine

== Most winners by high school ==
Number	High School Program
10	San Francisco Lowell High School
5	Hollywood High School
4	Mater Dei High School
4	San Francisco Galileo High School
4	St. Ignatius College Preparatory
3	Chino Hills High School
3	Crenshaw High School
3	Dominguez High School
3	Inglewood High School
3	Westchester High School
