= Len Elmore =

American lawyer (born 1952)

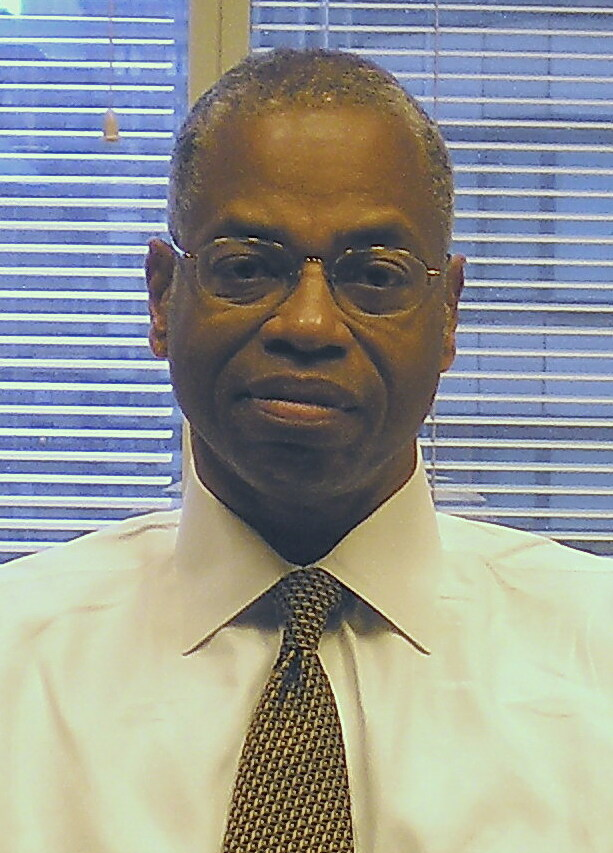
- Elmore in 2006

Personal information
- Born: March 28, 1952 (age 74) New York City, New York, U.S.
- Listed height: 6 ft 9 in (2.06 m)
- Listed weight: 220 lb (100 kg)

Career information
- High school: Power Memorial Academy (New York City, New York)
- College: Maryland (1971–1974)
- NBA draft: 1974: 1st round, 13th overall pick
- Drafted by: Washington Bullets
- Playing career: 1974–1984
- Position: Center / power forward
- Number: 41, 44

Career history
- 1974–1979: Indiana Pacers
- 1979–1980: Kansas City Kings
- 1980–1981: Milwaukee Bucks
- 1981–1983: New Jersey Nets
- 1983–1984: New York Knicks

Career highlights
- Consensus second-team All-American (1974); First-team All-ACC (1974); 2× Second-team All-ACC (1972, 1973)

Career ABA and NBA statistics
- Points: 3,948 (6.0 ppg)
- Rebounds: 3,360 (5.1 rpg)
- Blocks: 674 (1.0 bpg)
- Stats at NBA.com
- Stats at Basketball Reference

Leonard J. Elmore (born March 28, 1952) is an American sportscaster, lawyer and former National Basketball Association (NBA) player. Elmore has served as a college basketball analyst for ESPN and Fox Sports and has served in the same capacity for CBS Sports' coverage of the NCAA Tournament and NBA. He played in the NBA from 1974 to 1984 for various teams, including the Indiana Pacers, Kansas City Kings, Milwaukee Bucks, New Jersey Nets, and New York Knicks.

== Early life and NBA career ==
Elmore attended Power Memorial Academy in New York City, leading its basketball team to the City championship and the "Number 1 Team in the Nation" in 1970. He graduated from the University of Maryland College Park in 1974 where he was a three-time All-ACC player and an All-American in 1974. He is still Maryland's all-time leading rebounder, in both total rebounds and rebounding average.

Elmore is a ten-year veteran of the NBA having played for the Indiana Pacers, Kansas City Kings (currently known as the Sacramento Kings), Milwaukee Bucks, New Jersey Nets (Brooklyn Nets), New York Knicks, and he also played two seasons with the Pacers when they were in the ABA.

== Career statistics ==
Legend
GP	Games played	GS	Games started	MPG	Minutes per game
FG%	Field goal percentage	3P%	3-point field goal percentage	FT%	Free throw percentage
RPG	Rebounds per game	APG	Assists per game	SPG	Steals per game
BPG	Blocks per game	PPG	Points per game	**Bold**	Career high

=== Regular season ===
Year	Team	GP	GS	MPG	FG%	3P%	FT%	RPG	APG	SPG	BPG	PPG
1974–75	Indiana	**77**	-	18.4	**.417**	**1.000**	**.774**	5.1	0.5	0.9	1.2	6.6
1975–76	Indiana	76	-	**34.1**	.402	.000	.738	**10.8**	**1.6**	**1.8**	**2.3**	**14.6**
Career		153	-	26.2	.407	.250	.749	7.9	1.0	1.3	1.8	10.6

=== Playoffs ===
Year	Team	GP	GS	MPG	FG%	3P%	FT%	RPG	APG	SPG	BPG	PPG
1974–75	Indiana	**18**	-	**31.4**	**.437**	.000	.676	**8.1**	0.9	1.2	**2.2**	**10.6**
1975–76	Indiana	3	-	22.7	.300	.000	**1.000**	5.0	**1.3**	**1.7**	0.7	6.3
Career		21	-	30.1	.418	.000	.684	7.6	1.0	1.2	2.0	10.0

=== Regular season ===
Year	Team	GP	GS	MPG	FG%	3P%	FT%	RPG	APG	SPG	BPG	PPG
1976–77	Indiana	6	-	7.7	.412	-	**.800**	2.5	0.3	0.0	0.7	3.0
1977–78	Indiana	69	-	19.2	.368	-	.667	**6.1**	**1.2**	**1.1**	1.0	5.4
1978–79	Indiana	80	-	15.8	.406	-	.718	5.0	0.9	0.8	1.0	4.2
1979–80	Kansas City	58	-	15.8	.430	.000	.689	4.4	1.1	0.7	0.7	4.5
1980–81	Milwaukee	72	-	12.8	.358	.000	.720	2.9	1.0	0.5	0.7	2.9
1981–82	New Jersey	**81**	**70**	**25.9**	**.460**	.000	.794	5.4	**1.2**	**1.1**	**1.1**	**9.1**
1982–83	New Jersey	74	0	13.2	.398	.000	.643	3.2	0.5	0.6	0.5	3.4
1983–84	New York	65	5	12.8	.408	.000	.711	2.5	0.5	0.4	0.5	2.4
Career		505	75	16.6	.413	.000	.715	4.2	0.9	0.8	0.8	4.6

=== Playoffs ===
Year	Team	GP	GS	MPG	FG%	3P%	FT%	RPG	APG	SPG	BPG	PPG
1979–80	Kansas City	3	-	14.3	.308	.000	.500	3.7	0.3	**1.0**	0.3	3.0
1980–81	Milwaukee	**4**	-	3.0	.000	.000	.000	0.0	0.0	0.0	0.0	0.0
1981–82	New Jersey	2	-	**38.0**	**.563**	.000	**1.000**	**8.0**	**1.0**	0.5	**1.0**	**11.0**
1982–83	New Jersey	2	-	7.5	.400	.000	.500	4.5	0.5	0.5	0.0	2.5
Career		11	-	13.3	.429	.000	.750	3.3	0.4	0.5	0.3	3.3

== Broadcasting career ==
In 1990, Elmore served as the color commentator for CBS' number-two NBA broadcasting team (behind Dick Stockton and Hubie Brown), calling much of the Western Conference Playoff action alongside play-by-play man Verne Lundquist. He was also paired with Kevin Harlan for the first season for the Minnesota Timberwolves in the NBA. In 1992, Elmore alongside Lundquist, called the legendary East Regional Final between Duke and Kentucky, which ended with Duke's Christian Laettner's game-winning shot.

Elmore posted on his Twitter account that he was one of over 100 employees at ESPN that were laid off in April 2017.

== Law career ==
Elmore received a J.D. from Harvard Law School in 1987 and began his law career as a prosecutor, serving as an Assistant District Attorney in Brooklyn, New York.

Aside from his announcing duties, Elmore also previously served as Senior Counsel with LeBoeuf, Lamb, Greene & MacRae in New York City, where he currently resides and is the president of the National Basketball Retired Players Association. He also is a member of the Knight Commission on Intercollegiate Athletics.

Elmore teaches Seminar in Sports Media and Athlete Activism and Social Justice in Columbia University's Master of Science Program in Sports Management.

== Personal life ==
Elmore's brother, Robert, played basketball for the Wichita State Shockers.

== General and cited references ==
- NBA: Len Elmore player stats
- Basketball Reference
- Len Elmore at IMDb
- Len Elmore ESPN Bio
- Len Elmore Columbia University Faculty Bio
