= Ben Clyde =

American basketball player (born 1951)

Personal information
- Born: June 10, 1951 (age 75) Albany, Georgia, U.S.
- Listed height: 6 ft 7 in (2.01 m)
- Listed weight: 198 lb (90 kg)

Career information
- High school: Gibbs (St. Petersburg, Florida)
- College: Ellsworth CC (1970–1972); Florida State (1972–1973)
- NBA draft: 1974: 5th round, 89th overall pick
- Drafted by: Boston Celtics
- Playing career: 1974–1975
- Position: Small forward
- Number: 33

Career history
- 1974–1975: Boston Celtics
- Stats at NBA.com
- Stats at Basketball Reference

Benjamin James Clyde (born June 10, 1951) is an American former basketball player. Born in Albany, Georgia, he played for Florida State University. He was selected by the Boston Celtics in the 5th round (89th pick overall) of the 1974 NBA draft, then played for the Celtics (1974–75) in the National Basketball Association (NBA) for 25 games.

Sportswriter Vince Murray called Clyde "the best high school basketball player [he had] ever seen", and Barry McDermott of Sports Illustrated described Clyde as "a superior individual basketball talent", but Clyde's career suffered due to his repeated conflicts with other players and coaches.

== Career ==
In 1971, while he attended Ellsworth Community College, Clyde was voted Most Valuable Player of the year by the National Junior College Athletic Association. He later transferred to Florida State University, where he played well but clashed with his coaches. After Clyde was suspended for punching an opposing player during one game, Coach Hugh Durham described him as "thinking about himself and the hell with Florida State".

On the Celtics, Clyde played frequently in the early part of the 1974–75 season, while Don Nelson was injured. However, after Nelson's recovery, Clyde was given less playing time. Ultimately, he refused to go into a game after being tapped to play a "clean-up operation" in the last two minutes. After this incident, Clyde was benched for the remainder of the season, and turned down a contract to play with the Celtics for another season.

== Personal life ==
Clyde is one of eight siblings in his family. He was raised by a single mother, as his father left the family early in Clyde's life. He was also supported by Rubye Wysinger, one of his high school teachers, who has been described as a "pillar of support" for Clyde and as "one of [his] most trusted advisors".

Clyde was expelled from high school after an incident in which he allegedly extorted money from another student; however, he was later readmitted to the school.

== Career statistics ==
Legend
GP	Games played	GS	Games started	MPG	Minutes per game
FG%	Field goal percentage	3P%	3-point field goal percentage	FT%	Free throw percentage
RPG	Rebounds per game	APG	Assists per game	SPG	Steals per game
BPG	Blocks per game	PPG	Points per game	**Bold**	Career high

=== NBA ===
==== Regular season ====
Year	Team	GP	MPG	FG%	FT%	RPG	APG	SPG	BPG	PPG
1974–75	Boston	25	6.3	.431	.778	1.6	.2	.2	.1	2.8
