= John Shumate =

American basketball player and coach (1952–2025)

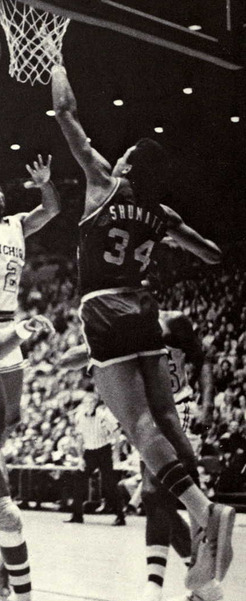
- Shumate with the Notre Dame Fighting Irish in 1973

Personal information
- Born: April 6, 1952 Greenville, South Carolina, U.S.
- Died: February 3, 2025 (aged 72)
- Listed height: 6 ft 9 in (2.06 m)
- Listed weight: 235 lb (107 kg)

Career information
- High school: Thomas Jefferson (Elizabeth, New Jersey)
- College: Notre Dame (1971–1974)
- NBA draft: 1974: 1st round, 4th overall pick
- Drafted by: Phoenix Suns
- Playing career: 1975–1980
- Position: Power forward / center
- Number: 34
- Coaching career: 1983–2010

Career history

Playing
- 1975–1976: Phoenix Suns
- 1976–1977: Buffalo Braves
- 1977–1979: Detroit Pistons
- 1979–1980: Houston Rockets
- 1980: San Antonio Spurs
- 1981: Seattle SuperSonics

Coaching
- 1983–1986: Grand Canyon
- 1988–1995: SMU
- 1995–1998: Toronto Raptors (assistant)
- 2003: Phoenix Mercury
- 2009–2010: Phoenix Suns (assistant)

Career highlights
- As player: NBA All-Rookie First Team (1976); Consensus first-team All-American (1974); As head coach: SWC regular season champion (1993)

Career NBA statistics
- Points: 3,920 (12.3 ppg)
- Rebounds: 2,388 (7.5 rpg)
- Assists: 574 (1.8 apg)
- Stats at NBA.com
- Stats at Basketball Reference

John Henry Shumate (April 6, 1952 – February 3, 2025) was an American professional and college basketball player and coach. Shumate played in the National Basketball Association (NBA) for the Phoenix Suns, Buffalo Braves, Detroit Pistons, Houston Rockets, San Antonio Spurs, and Seattle SuperSonics from 1975 to 1981. He was the fourth overall selection in the 1974 NBA draft. In addition to missing a full college season when he was 19 years old, Shumate's professional playing career was cut short by a blood clotting disorder that led him to miss over 2½ NBA seasons by age 28.

Shumate played college basketball for the University of Notre Dame Fighting Irish. He averaged 22.4 points and 13 rebounds per game on the freshman team, but missed the next season with a life-threatening blood clotting condition. Shumate was able to play the following two seasons, averaging 22.6 points and 11.6 rebounds per game over that time. He led Notre Dame to the 1973 National Invitation Tournament's championship game and was named the tournament's Most Valuable Player.

On January 19, 1974, Shumate led the Fighting Irish to a 71–70 victory over the UCLA Bruins, breaking UCLA's 88-game winning streak that had lasted for nearly 1,100 days. Shumate was a consensus first-team All-American in 1974. In 2005, he was named to Notre Dame's All-Century Team, and was later inducted into Notre Dame's Ring of Honor and had his number retired by the school. Shumate ranks first in Notre Dame history with a career .610 field goal percentage, fourth in points per game, and sixth in rebounds per game.

Shumate was a college basketball head coach for the Grand Canyon Antelopes and SMU Mustangs, head coach of the Phoenix Mercury of the WNBA, an assistant coach at Notre Dame, and an assistant coach for the Toronto Raptors and Phoenix Suns of the NBA. He led SMU to the 1993 NCAA Division 1 men's basketball tournament and was the Southwest Conference Coach of the Year in 1993. In 1985, he led Grand Canyon to the finals of the NAIA District VIII Playoffs.

== Early life ==
Shumate was born on April 6, 1952, in Greenville, South Carolina, to Eugene and Margaret Shumate. Eugene Shumate was a minister. Shumate grew up in Elizabeth, New Jersey. He and his four sisters were raised in a religious household. Shumate's parents were his inspiration in basketball and in life.

Shumate played high school basketball at the all-male Thomas Jefferson High School, scoring over 1,000 points in his career. He only started playing basketball as a high school sophomore, after he had grown to 6 ft 5 in (1.96 m) and coach Ron Kelly convinced him to try out for the team. Under Kelly's training and tutelage, he was on the varsity team by the second half of the season. Shumate went on to become a high school All-American in his senior year. He starred in the Sonny Hill League in Philadelphia.

== College ==
Shumate received a scholarship to attend the University of Notre Dame, graduating in 1974 with a Bachelors of Arts degree in sociology. In 1970–71, Shumate had an excellent year for the Fighting Irish men’s freshman basketball team, averaging 22.4 points and 13 rebounds per game, with a 53 percent field goal percentage. Shumate missed his sophomore season due to life-threatening blood clots in his leg, and a distinct viral infection near his heart unrelated to the blod clots. He spent nine days in intensive care, losing 45 pounds. The clotting problem would plague him into his future basketball career; it later being reported he had a rare underlying disorder that caused blood clotting in his lungs. The Fighting Irish were 6–20 during the season Shumate missed (1971–72).

Shumate returned to play in the 1972–73 season, under coach Digger Phelps. He was considered a sophomore. Shumate averaged 21 points and 12.2 rebounds per game; leading Notre Dame in both categories. He set a Notre Dame school record with a .592 field goal percentage. The team had an 18–12 record that season.

Notre Dame was invited to play in the 1973 National Invitation Tournament (NIT), with a 15–11 win-loss record, the worst record of any of the 16 teams in the tournament. In the first game of the tournament against the University of Southern California, Shumate led both teams with 24 points, and hit crucial free throws to break a tie late in the game in helping Notre Dame win, 69–65.

Shumate next led the Fighting Irish with 19 points in a win over Louisville, 79–71 (also collecting nine rebounds). Shumate made all nine of his field goal attempts in that game. In Notre Dame's NIT final four win, 78–71, against the nationally ranked North Carolina Tar Heels, Shumate led all scorers in the game with 24 points. He made his first eleven field goal attempts in that game, giving Shumate 20 consecutive field goals made over two games (missing only his last shot attempt in the game against North Carolina).

Notre Dame lost the NIT championship game to Virginia Tech, 92–91, in overtime. Shumate again led all scorers, with 28 points; and led Notre Dame with 11 rebounds. Shumate was named the 1973 NIT's Most Valuable Player. In March 1973, the National Association of Collegiate Basketball Writers named Shumate to its Rookie All-America Team.

As a junior (1973–74), Shumate averaged 24.2 points and 11 rebounds per game, again leading Notre Dame in both categories. Shumate was the NCAA's 10th leading scorer in the nation that season. He had a .627 field goal percentage, breaking his own Notre Dame season record set a year earlier (which is still third all-time in Notre Dame history for a season as of 2025–26). He was the Fighting Irish's team captain for a second season, and was a consensus first-team All-American in 1974; selected by both the Associated Press (AP) and United Press International (UPI) as a first-team All-American.

Shumate was the center on the Notre Dame team that ended the University of California at Los Angeles' (UCLA) NCAA-record 88-game winning streak on January 19, 1974, with a 71–70 win. It was UCLA's first loss in 1,092 days. Shumate starred on offense and defense, and led all players in rebounding that day. He had 24 points and 11 rebounds, and pulled down the final rebound of the game as time expired. Going into that game, the Associated Press ranked Notre Dame No. 2 and UCLA No. 1; with Notre Dame ranked No. 1 after defeating UCLA.

The Fighting Irish ended the year with at 26–3 record, ranked fifth in the nation. Notre Dame went to the 1974 NCAA Division 1 basketball tournament. Notre Dame defeated Austin Peay in the first round of the Mideast Regional tournament. Shumate had 22 points, 10 rebounds, five assists, two steals, and one blocked shot in that game. Notre Dame was upset by Michigan in the Mideast Regional semifinals, 77–68. Shumate had 34 points and 17 rebounds, but no other Notre Dame player scored more than 11 points. Notre Dame defeated Vanderbilt for third place in the Mideast Region, with Shumate again leading Notre Dame in points (30), while also collecting seven rebounds. Shumate was named to the Mideast All-Region team. He had the highest scoring average in the tournament that year (28.7 points per game).

Although he was still considered a junior in 1974, Shumate was eligible to sign a professional contract, and had to decide if he was going to return to Notre Dame or play professionally. He had been granted another year of college eligibility because he had missed the 1971–72 season with serious health issues. At the end of March 1974, Shumate decided to become a professional basketball player. In making this decision, he gave primary consideration to his family's needs, then to Notre Dame, and lastly to his own personal wishes. He also decided to graduate that May instead of prolonging his education.

== Professional basketball ==
The Phoenix Suns drafted Shumate in the first round of the 1974 NBA draft, fourth overall. A 6 ft 9 in (2.06 m) forward/center, Shumate played all or parts of five seasons (1975 to1978; 1979 to 1980) in the National Basketball Association (NBA) as a member of the Phoenix Suns, Buffalo Braves, Detroit Pistons, Houston Rockets, San Antonio Spurs and Seattle SuperSonics. He did not play in the 1974-75 season after a blood clot was found in his lung, and he underwent an eight month therapy program before returning the following season.

Shumate's rookie season came in 1975–76. He earned NBA All-Rookie Team honors after averaging 11.3 points per game and 5.6 rebounds per game, and virtually tying Wes Unseld for the league lead in field goal percentage at .561. He was traded in February 1976, during his rookie year, to the Buffalo Braves for five-year veteran Gar Heard and a second round draft pick, as part of the Suns' pursuit of an NBA title that year. Shumate was fifth in Rookie of the Year voting, with the Suns' center Alvan Adams winning the award.

In the 1976–77 season for the Buffalo Braves, Shumate had his best year, averaging 15.1 points and 9.5 rebounds per game. Early the next season, Buffalo traded Shumate, Gus Gerard and a 1979 first round draft pick to the Detroit Pistons for Marvin Barnes, a 1978 second round pick and fourth round pick. Shumate averaged 15.5 points and 8.9 rebounds per game in 62 games for the Pistons. Barnes had been a first-team All-American selection in 1974 with Shumate (along with Bill Walton, David Thompson, and Jamaal Wilkes).

Shumate did not play the following season (1978–79) due to a recurrence of blood clots in his lungs. He considered retiring from the NBA and returning to school for a masters degree. Shumate did make a comeback after sitting out a year. Shumate returned to the Pistons to begin the 1979–80 season, and was a popular player with Pistons' fans. He played in nine games for the Pistons that season before being waived. He was signed in early November 1979 by the Houston Rockets. He played in 29 games for the Rockets that season, averaging 11.4 minutes per game.

In mid-January 1980, the Rockets traded Shumate and a third-round draft choice to the to the San Antonio Spurs for Billy Paultz. Shumate finished the 1979–80 season playing in 27 games for the Spurs, with nine double-doubles in points and rebounding. Shumate played nearly 29 minutes per game at power forward for the Spurs, averaging 14.5 points, 7.9 rebounds, and 1.9 assists per game. In a late January game against the Atlanta Hawks, Shumate played 37 minutes, with 29 points, 10 rebounds, and four assists. He was popular with the Spurs' fans and received a number of standing ovations during his time with the teams in 1979–80.

Shumate began the 1980–81 season with the Spurs. He played in 22 games for the Spurs averaging 23.6 minutes, 7.5 points, and four rebounds per game. In late November, the Spurs traded Shumate to the Seattle SuperSonics for a third-round draft choice and cash. Shumate played in only two games for Seattle for a total of eight minutes. These were the last games in his NBA career. After a physical examination, the SuperSonics' medical advisors concluded that there were blood clots in Shumate's lungs and/or legs. This voided the trade and Shumate was returned to the Spurs on December 1. The Spurs had no room on their roster for Shumate and waived him.

No other team claimed Shumate after the Spurs waived him. Shumate and his own physicians disputed that he was unable to play in the NBA because of his health, and said the x-rays on which Seattle concluded he had blood clots did not in fact show any negative change in Shumate's condition. It was reported at the time that NBA executives were worried about the possibility that Shumate could die while playing in a game, and did not want to take that risk.

Over the course of his NBA career, Shumate missed two full seasons because of his blood clotting disorder, and his final NBA season ended with more than one-half of the season remaining when more blood clots were discovered. He was 28-years old when his career ended. During his five-year NBA career, Shumate played in 318 games, averaging 12.3 points, 7.5 rebounds, 1.8 assists, and one steal per game.

== Coaching and scouting career ==
Shumate was a volunteer assistant coach/graduate assistant to Notre Dame's Digger Phelps after retiring from the NBA (1981 to 1983). He had been considering coaching at Scottsdale Community College, but Phelps believed Shumate needed time to get his life together after his difficulties in the NBA and would benefit by returning to Notre Dame. Shumate said he learned about the human side of coaching from Phelps. Shumate next became the head coach at Grand Canyon College (now Grand Canyon University). Shumate coached Grand Canyon from 1983 to 1986, with a 58–33 record. In the 1984–85 season, the team made it to the finals of the NAIA District VIII Playoffs.

He returned to Phelps and Notre Dame as an assistant coach from 1986 to 1988. Shumate was next hired as head coach of the Southern Methodist University (SMU) Mustangs, where he coached for seven seasons (1988 to 1995). His best season was 1992–93, when the Mustangs went 20–8, won the Southwest Conference title, and went to the NCAA tournament (losing in the first round). He was SMU's first black coach in any sport. Shumate was the Southwest Conference Coach of the Year in 1993.

Shumate was an assistant coach for the Toronto Raptors for three seasons (1995–98). He had an offer to continue with the Raptors, but had moved his family to Phoenix in 1998 and wanted to be with them. He initially worked for Phoenix's Parks and Recreation Department and as a substitute teacher. Shumate then returned to the NBA, working in community relations for the Phoenix Suns before becoming a college scout for the Suns in 2001. He was hired as head coach of the WNBA's Phoenix Mercury in 2002. He left the Mercury in February 2004, and returned to the Suns as a college scout. Shumate was an assistant coach for the Phoenix Suns in 2009–10. He continued as a Suns' scout after his assistant coaching ended.

== Legacy and honors ==
On March 5, 2005, Shumate was named to Notre Dame's All-Century Team. In 2022, Shumate was inducted into Notre Dame's Ring of Honor, and his No. 34 jersey was retired and hangs in the rafters at Purcell Pavillion (now the Joyce Center). He ranks first in Notre Dame history with a career .610 field goal percentage, fourth in points per game (22.6), and sixth in rebounds per game (11.6) (though 2025–26).

While injured as a player with the Phoenix Suns, he served as the team's color commentator on game broadcasts and did post-game interviews. He was also a sports anchor on television news in Buffalo, while playing with the Braves in 1976–77. Notre Dame sports information director Roger Valdiserri said of Shumate, "'I loved to hear him conduct interviews. He always said exactly what he felt, but he always said exactly the right things'". Longtime NBA assistant coach Bob Kloppenburg described Shumate as "'a great teacher of fundamentals and a great communicator with pro athletes'". Shumate also appeared in a series of basketball training videos.

== Personal life and death ==
Shumate was married to Marilyn Shumate, and he had three children. He appeared as a member of the Detroit team in the cult classic basketball film The Fish That Saved Pittsburgh in 1979, alongside Pistons teammates Bob Lanier, Eric Money, Chris Ford, Kevin Porter, and Leon Douglas.

Shumate died on February 3, 2025, at the age of 72.

== Career playing statistics ==
Legend
GP	Games played	GS	Games started	MPG	Minutes per game
FG%	Field goal percentage	3P%	3-point field goal percentage	FT%	Free throw percentage
RPG	Rebounds per game	APG	Assists per game	SPG	Steals per game
BPG	Blocks per game	PPG	Points per game	**Bold**	Career high

=== NBA ===
==== Regular season ====
Year	Team	GP	MPG	FG%	3P%	FT%	RPG	APG	SPG	BPG	PPG
1975–76	Phoenix	43	21.6	.550		.628	5.6	1.4	1.0	.4	11.3
1975–76	Buffalo	32	32.7	**.575**		.678	**9.8**	2.0	**1.2**	.6	12.2
1976–77	Buffalo	**74**	**35.1**	.502		.671	9.5	2.1	**1.2**	**1.1**	15.1
1977–78	Buffalo	18	32.8	.497		.747	7.1	**3.2**	.8	.5	12.4
1977–78	Detroit	62	35.0	.508		**.797**	8.9	2.0	**1.2**	.7	**15.5**
1979–80	Detroit	9	25.3	.538	–	.680	7.8	1.0	1.0	.6	9.7
1979–80	Houston	29	11.4	.531	–	.750	2.7	.8	.3	.3	3.5
1979–80	San Antonio	27	28.8	.525	.000	.782	7.9	1.9	.9	**1.1**	14.5
1980–81	San Antonio	22	23.6	.438	–	.726	4.0	1.1	1.0	.4	7.5
1980–81	Seattle	2	4.0	.000	–	.667	.5	.0	.0	.0	1.0
Career		318	28.9	.516	.000	.720	7.5	1.8	1.0	.7	12.3

==== Playoffs ====
Year	Team	GP	MPG	FG%	3P%	FT%	RPG	APG	SPG	BPG	PPG
1976	Buffalo	**9**	**40.2**	**.587**		.500	**8.6**	**2.8**	1.0	**1.4**	**14.1**
1980	San Antonio	3	26.0	450	–	**1.000**	4.3	1.7	**1.3**	1.3	7.0
Career		12	36.7	.563	–	.537	7.5	2.5	1.1	1.4	12.3

== Head coaching record ==
=== College ===
Record table
Season	Team	Overall	Conference	Standing	Postseason
Grand Canyon Antelopes (NAIA District VII) (1983–1986)
1983–84	Grand Canyon	21–9			
1984–85	Grand Canyon	18–16			
1985–86	Grand Canyon	18–9			
Grand Canyon:		57–34			
SMU Mustangs (Southwest Conference) (1988–1995)
1988–89	SMU	13–16	7–9	7th	
1989–90	SMU	10–18	5–11	T–7th	
1990–91	SMU	12–17	6–10	6th	
1991–92	SMU	10–18	4–10	7th	
1992–93	SMU	20–8	12–2	1st	NCAA Division I First Round
1993–94	SMU	6–21	3–11	T–7th	
1994–95	SMU	7–20	3–11	T–7th	
SMU:		78–118	40–64		
Total:		135–152			
National champion Postseason invitational champion Conference regular season champion Conference regular season and conference tournament champion Division regular season champion Division regular season and conference tournament champion Conference tournament champion

=== WNBA ===
Legend
Regular season	G	Games coached	W	Games won	L	Games lost	W–L %	Win–loss %
Playoffs	PG	Playoff games	PW	Playoff wins	PL	Playoff losses	PW–L %	Playoff win–loss %

Team	Year	G	W	L	W–L%	Finish	PG	PW	PL	PW–L%	Result
Phoenix	2003	34	8	26	.235	7th in Western	–	–	–	–	
Career		34	8	26	.235		–	–	–		
