= Dennis Van Zant =

American basketball player (born 1952)

Personal information
- Born: June 1, 1952 (age 74) Glendora, California, U.S.
- Listed height: 6 ft 9 in (2.06 m)
- Listed weight: 210 lb (95 kg)

Career information
- High school: Glendora (Glendora, California)
- College: Azusa Pacific (1970–1974)
- NBA draft: 1974: 7th round, 120th overall pick
- Drafted by: Los Angeles Lakers
- Playing career: 1975–1976
- Position: Power forward

Career history
- 1975: Swiss Alpines
- 1975: San Antonio Spurs
- 1975–1976: Santa Rosa Oilers

Career highlights
- NCCAA All-American (1973, 1974)
- Stats at Basketball Reference

Dennis Van Zant (born June 1, 1952) is an American former basketball player. He played college basketball for the Azusa Pacific Cougars for four years before embarking on a short professional career, including in the American Basketball Association (ABA) with the San Antonio Spurs.

== College career ==
After playing basketball for just one season in high school, Van Zant played collegiately for Azusa Pacific for four years. In 1973, he averaged 20.8 points per game and was a NAIA All-American honorable mention selection. He was a First-team NCCAA All-American in 1973 and 1974. In 1994, he was inducted into the schools hall of fame.

== Professional career ==
Van Zant was drafted by the Los Angeles Lakers in the seventh round (120th overall) of the 1974 NBA draft but never appeared in a game for them. His first professional stint was with the Swiss Alpines in European Professional Basketball League during the league's only season in early 1975.

In July 1975, he was signed by the ABA's San Antonio Spurs after impressing coach Bob Bass with his ball-handling ability during the rookie camp. He was released by the Spurs in November, having played only two minutes in one game, scoring as many points.

In December, he signed with the Santa Rosa Oilers in the Western Basketball Association. He played one season for the Oilers, where he finished fifth in the league in scoring (23.2 ppg) and second in rebounds (12.7 rpg).

== Personal life ==
Dennis' brother, Larry Van Zant, played college basketball for Azusa.
