= Butch Taylor (basketball) =

American basketball player (born 1951)

Personal information
- Born: February 11, 1951 (age 75) Greenville, South Carolina, U.S.
- Listed height: 6 ft 10 in (2.08 m)
- Listed weight: 230 lb (104 kg)

Career information
- High school: Greenville (Greenville, South Carolina)
- College: Gulf Coast JC (1970–1972); Jacksonville (1972–1974)
- NBA draft: 1974: 4th round, 55th overall pick
- Drafted by: Philadelphia 76ers
- Position: Center

Career history
- 1976–1977: Partizan
- Stats at Basketball Reference

Lawyer "Butch" Taylor (born February 11, 1951) is an American former professional basketball player.

== Professional career ==
In the 1974 NBA draft, Taylor was selected 55th overall by the Philadelphia 76ers. On 13 September 1974, Taylor signed a multi-year contract with 76ers.

Taylor joined KK Partizan in the 1976–77 season. He was the second foreign basketball player in Yugoslavia, and was signed solely for European competition, as foreign players were not eligible to play in the Yugoslav federal league.
