= Cliff Pondexter =

American basketball player (born 1954)

Personal information
- Born: September 15, 1954 (age 72) Fresno, California, U.S.
- Listed height: 6 ft 9 in (2.06 m)
- Listed weight: 233 lb (106 kg)

Career information
- High school: San Joaquin Memorial (Fresno, California)
- College: Long Beach State (1973–1974)
- NBA draft: 1974: 1st round, 16th overall pick
- Drafted by: Chicago Bulls
- Playing career: 1975–1986
- Position: Power forward
- Number: 42, 41

Career history
- 1975–1978: Chicago Bulls
- 1978–1981: ASPO Tours
- 1981–1982: Bartolini Brindisi
- 1982–1983: Hapoal Ramat Gan Giv’atayim
- 1983–1984: Scavolini Pesaro
- 1985–1986: Hapoel Holon

Career highlights
- First-team Parade All-American (1973); California Mr. Basketball (1972)

Career NBA and Serie A statistics
- Points: 1,556 (6.0 ppg)
- Rebounds: 1,272 (4.9 rpg)
- Assists: 252 (1.0 apg)
- Stats at NBA.com
- Stats at Basketball Reference

Clifton Pondexter (born September 15, 1954) is an American former professional basketball player.

A 6'9" power forward from Fresno, California, Pondexter starred at San Joaquin Memorial High School with his brother Roscoe. At the conclusion of his college career at California State University, Long Beach, Pondexter was selected by the Chicago Bulls in the first round with the sixteenth pick of the 1974 NBA draft and by the San Diego Conquistadors in the first round of the 1974 ABA Draft. Pondexter's NBA career was delayed by a stress fracture in his leg he suffered in the summer of 1974; he did not make his professional debut until a fall 1975 exhibition game against the Kentucky Colonels.

Between 1975 and 1978, Pondexter played 197 games for the Bulls. His best season was 1975–76, when he averaged 5.8 points and 5.1 rebounds per game. He never fully bounced back from his injury, however, and was waived by the Bulls in the summer of 1978. He then took his career to Europe.

Pondexter's nephew, Quincy Pondexter, was selected by the New Orleans Hornets in the first round of the 2010 NBA draft.

== Career statistics ==
Legend
GP	Games played	GS	Games started	MPG	Minutes per game
FG%	Field goal percentage	3P%	3-point field goal percentage	FT%	Free throw percentage
RPG	Rebounds per game	APG	Assists per game	SPG	Steals per game
BPG	Blocks per game	PPG	Points per game	**Bold**	Career high

=== NBA ===
==== Regular season ====
Year	Team	GP	GS	MPG	FG%	FT%	RPG	APG	SPG	BPG	PPG
1975–76	Chicago	75	**31**	**17.7**	.411	.670	**5.1**	1.2	**.4**	**.3**	**5.8**
1976–77	Chicago	**78**	2	12.8	.416	.646	3.0	.5	**.4**	.1	3.3
1977–78	Chicago	44	0	12.1	**.435**	**.700**	3.0	**2.0**	**.4**	**.3**	2.0
Career		197	33	14.5	.416	.667	3.8	1.1	.4	.3	3.9

==== Playoffs ====
Year	Team	GP	MPG	FG%	FT%	RPG	APG	SPG	BPG	PPG
1977	Chicago	3	4.0	.000	1.000	1.0	.3	.0	.0	.7
