= Clyde Dickey =

American basketball player (1951–2003)

Personal information
- Born: December 14, 1951 Fort Wayne, Indiana
- Died: January 30, 2003 (aged 51)
- Listed height: 6 ft 3 in (1.91 m)
- Listed weight: 185 lb (84 kg)

Career information
- High school: Central (Fort Wayne, Indiana)
- College: Boise State (1972–1974)
- NBA draft: 1974: 7th round, 112th overall pick
- Drafted by: Phoenix Suns
- Position: Shooting guard
- Number: 34

Career history
- 1974–1975: Utah Stars

Career highlights
- First-team All-Big Sky (1974)
- Stats at Basketball Reference

Clyde Lavell Dickey (December 14, 1951 – January 30, 2003) was an American professional basketball shooting guard who spent one season in the American Basketball Association (ABA) with the Utah Stars during the 1974–75 season. He was drafted in the seventh round (112^{th} overall) of the 1974 NBA draft from Boise State University by the Phoenix Suns, but never played for them.

He was voted All-Big Sky Conference his SR season for the Broncos and remains a fixture in the Broncos record book.
