= Roscoe Pondexter =

American basketball player (born 1952)

Personal information
- Born: October 17, 1952 (age 74) Fresno, California, U.S.
- Listed height: 6 ft 6 in (1.98 m)
- Listed weight: 210 lb (95 kg)

Career information
- High school: San Joaquin Memorial (Fresno, California)
- College: Fresno CC (1971–1972); Long Beach State (1972–1974)
- NBA draft: 1974: 3rd round, 53rd overall pick
- Drafted by: Boston Celtics
- Position: Small forward

Career history
- 1978: Colosos de Carabobo
- 1978–1981: Pagnossin / Tai Ginseng Gorizia
- 1982–1983: Cover Jeans Roseto
- 1983–1984: Carrera Venezia
- 1987: Sport Club Cañadense

Career highlights
- LPB Most Valuable Player (1978); 2× First-team All-PCAA (1973, 1974); California Mr. Basketball (1971)
- Stats at Basketball Reference

Roscoe Pondexter Jr. (born October 17, 1952) is an American former professional basketball player. He played college basketball for the Long Beach State 49ers from 1972 to 1974. Pondexter was a third round pick of the Boston Celtics in the 1974 NBA draft, but played his professional career in Europe and South America. He became a prison guard after his retirement from basketball and was involved with a gang at California State Prison, Corcoran who earned notoriety for their brutal treatment of inmates.

== Early life ==
Roscoe Pondexter Jr. was born on October 17, 1952, in Fresno, California, to Roscoe Sr. and Zeola (née Green) Pondexter. His father, Roscoe Pondexter Sr. (1929–2007), was from Hope, Arkansas, and moved to Fresno in 1946; he married Green of Fresno in 1949. Pondexter Sr. worked as a union construction worker on major projects in California including the Friant Dam and California State Route 168.

== High school and college career ==
Pondexter and his younger brother, Cliff, emerged as a dominant duo while playing at San Joaquin Memorial High School in Fresno, California. Pondexter graduated in 1971 as the highest prep scorer in California basketball history with 2,288 points and was named California Mr. Basketball for his senior season.

In May 1971, Pondexter committed to begin his college basketball career at Fresno City College. He transferred to play for the Long Beach State 49ers after his sophomore season but missed the start of the 1972–73 season due to a delay of his summer school transcripts. Pondexter was ruled eligible in November 1972. He was named to the first-team All-Pacific Coast Athletic Association (PCAA) after he averaged 14.6 points and 9.3 rebounds per game during his sophomore season.

Pondexter was reunited with his brother as teammates during the 1973–74 season. During his junior year, the National Collegiate Athletic Association (NCAA) accused Pondexter and teammate Glenn McDonald of having someone else take their entrance exams and declared them ineligible. Pondexter and McDonald returned to the team and finished the season after a court order was obtained. Pondexter earned his second nomination to the first-team All-PCAA as he averaged 15.6 points and 6.9 rebounds per game during his junior season.

== Professional career ==
Pondexter successfully applied for a hardship from the National Basketball Association (NBA) and was an early entrant in the 1974 NBA draft alongside his brother. They cited the financial need of their family as their reason for applying; Pondexter went against the recommendation of Long Beach State head coach Lute Olson that he stay in college. Pondexter was selected by the Boston Celtics in the third round. He chose to join the Virginia Squires of the American Basketball Association (ABA) who had also selected him in the third round of the ABA draft. He was released by the Squires one week before the 1974–75 season.

On August 13, 1975, Pondexter signed with the San Diego Sails of the ABA. He was one of the last players cut before the start of the 1975–76 season.

Pondexter instead played professionally in Europe and South America for ten years. Pondexter received the award for Most Valuable Player of the Liga Profesional de Baloncesto (LPB) while playing for Colosos de Carabobo in 1978. He played for Pagnossin / Tai Ginseng Gorizia from 1978 to 1981. Pondexter played for Carrera Venezia during the 1983–84 season.

== Post-playing career ==
Pondexter returned to Fresno after his basketball career ended and worked as a guard in a local county jail. He quickly moved up the field and became a California correctional peace officer while he worked at Soledad Prison. In 1988, Pondexter was selected to work for the newly opened California State Prison, Corcoran. He became a member of a gang of guards who were known for their brutal tactics on prisoners; he earned the nickname "Bonecrusher" for his involvement. The Corcoran guards gang was active from 1989 to 1995 and were responsible for starting prisoner fights for wagering, savagely inducting prisoners into the facility and fatally shooting prisoners "for sport". Pondexter developed a reputation for his torture of prisoners and a strangulation technique that would bring victims close to unconsciousness. Investigations at the facility began after the murder of an inmate by a guard and Pondexter was stood down for an incident in which he manhandled an inmate.

Pondexter gave court testimony in 1999 against his former coworkers in return for immunity from prosecution.

After his prison guard career ended, Pondexter earned a Bachelor of Arts in sociology from the California State University, Fresno, and worked as an assistant in the athletic department.

== Personal life ==
Pondexter has three children with his wife Doris. His youngest son, Quincy, played in the NBA. Pondexter encouraged Quincy to play college basketball for all four years and told him: "I'm not going to let you make the dumb mistake that I made."

Pondexter's brother-in-law, Keith Gooch, played on the Fresno State Bulldogs football team.
