= Gene Harmon =

American basketball player (1952–2015)

Personal information
- Born: January 27, 1952 Nampa, Idaho
- Died: December 11, 2015 (aged 63) Grapevine, Texas
- Listed height: 6 ft 6 in (1.98 m)
- Listed weight: 225 lb (102 kg)

Career information
- High school: Schuyler Central (Schuyler, Nebraska)
- College: Creighton (1971–1974)
- NBA draft: 1974: 6th round, 107th overall pick
- Drafted by: Boston Celtics
- Position: Forward
- Stats at Basketball Reference

Milo "Gene" Harmon (January 27, 1952 – December 11, 2015) was an American college basketball player.

At 6 ft 6 in (1.98 m), Harmon played small forward for Coach Eddie Sutton at Creighton University in Omaha, Nebraska from 1971 to 1974. He was the leading scorer and Team MVP all 3 years he played on the varsity team, and was a member of Eddie Sutton's first NCAA tournament team in 1974. He left the school as the 4th leading scorer in Creighton University history with a total of 1,369 points and is currently the 15th leading scorer of all time. By NCAA rule, freshmen were not allowed to compete at the varsity level, so his stats totals only include his sophomore through senior seasons.

Harmon ended his college career by scoring 22 points against the University of Louisville to secure a 3rd-place finish in the Midwest Regional of the NCAA tournament in 1974 at the Mabee Center in Tulsa, Oklahoma. In a combined total of three NCAA tournament games in 1974, Creighton went 2–1 with victories over the University of Texas (77–61) and University of Louisville (80–71), but lost to the University of Kansas (55–54) in the round of 16. Harmon averaged 20 points during the tournament and did not miss a single free throw (10–10). He was named to the 1974 Midwest All-Regional Team.

Harmon was an AP Honorable Mention All-American and was selected to play in the 1974 National Association of Basketball Coaches (NABC) College All-Star Game representing the West team.

Following his senior season, Harmon was drafted by the Boston Celtics with the 17th pick in the 6th round of the 1974 NBA draft.

== College statistics ==
Season averages

Season	MIN	PTS	REB	AST	TO	FG%	FT%
1971–72	32	15.8	7.1	1.3	2.2	51.3%	79.0%
1972–73	31	15.8	5.6	1.6	2.3	50.9%	69.6%
1973–74	34	18.3	5.6	2.3	1.9	55.6%	84.7%
Career	32.6	16.7	6.1	1.8	2.1	52.9%	78.5%

Season totals

Season	GP	MIN	PTS	REB	AST	TO	FGM	FGA	FTM	FTA
1971–72	26	844	411	185	35	58	164	320	83	105
1972–73	26	801	413	146	42	59	187	367	39	56
1973–74	30	1025	545	167	70	57	242	435	61	72
Career	82	2670	1369	498	147	174	593	1122	183	233
