= Leon Benbow =

American basketball player (born 1950)

Personal information
- Born: July 23, 1950 (age 76) Columbia, South Carolina, U.S.
- Listed height: 6 ft 4 in (1.93 m)
- Listed weight: 185 lb (84 kg)

Career information
- High school: Booker T. Washington (Columbia, South Carolina)
- College: Jacksonville (1971–1974)
- NBA draft: 1974: 2nd round, 27th overall pick
- Drafted by: Chicago Bulls
- Playing career: 1974–1976
- Position: Shooting guard
- Number: 5

Career history
- 1974–1976: Chicago Bulls
- Stats at NBA.com
- Stats at Basketball Reference

Leon Benbow (born July 23, 1950) is an American former basketball player who played briefly in the National Basketball Association (NBA). He played college basketball for the Jacksonville Dolphins.

He was selected by the Chicago Bulls in the second round (27th pick overall) of the 1974 NBA draft and by the San Diego Conquistadors in the seventh round of the 1974 ABA Draft.

He played for the Bulls (1974–76) in the NBA for 115 games.

== Career statistics ==
Legend
GP	Games played	GS	Games started	MPG	Minutes per game
FG%	Field goal percentage	3P%	3-point field goal percentage	FT%	Free throw percentage
RPG	Rebounds per game	APG	Assists per game	SPG	Steals per game
BPG	Blocks per game	PPG	Points per game	**Bold**	Career high

=== NBA ===
==== Regular season ====
Year	Team	GP	GS	MPG	FG%	FT%	RPG	APG	SPG	BPG	PPG
1974–75	Chicago	39	1	6.5	.372	**.833**	1.0	.6	.3	**.2**	2.2
1975–76	Chicago	**76**	**22**	**20.9**	**.397**	.750	**2.3**	**2.1**	**.8**	.1	**7.1**
Career		115	23	16.0	.394	.759	1.9	1.6	.6	.1	5.5

==== Playoffs ====
Year	Team	GP	MPG	FG%	FT%	RPG	APG	SPG	BPG	PPG
1975	Chicago	2	2.5	.500	.500	.5	1.0	.0	.0	2.5
