= 1974 NBA draft =

Basketball player selection

General information
- Sport: Basketball
- Date: May 28, 1974
- Location: New York City, New York

Overview
- 178 total selections in 10 rounds
- League: NBA
- First selection: Bill Walton, Portland Trail Blazers
- Hall of Famers: 4: F Bill Walton; F Bobby Jones; G Keith Wilkes; G George Gervin

The 1974 NBA draft was the 28th annual draft of the National Basketball Association (NBA), and was held on May 28, 1974, before the 1974–75 season. In this draft, 18 NBA teams took turns selecting amateur U.S. college basketball players and other eligible players, including international players. The first two picks in the draft belonged to the teams that finished last in each conference, with the order determined by a coin flip. The Portland Trail Blazers won the coin flip on March 27 and were awarded the first overall pick, while the Philadelphia 76ers were awarded the second pick. The remaining first-round picks and the subsequent rounds were assigned to teams in reverse order of their win–loss record in the previous season.

Prior to the draft, the Capital Bullets were renamed the Washington Bullets. The expansion New Orleans Jazz took part in their first NBA draft and were assigned the tenth pick in each round. A player who had finished his four-year college eligibility was eligible for selection. If a player left college early, he would not be eligible for selection until his college class graduated. Before the draft, 20 college underclassmen were declared eligible for selection under the "hardship" rule. These players had applied and gave evidence of financial hardship to the league, which granted them the right to start earning their living by starting their professional careers earlier. The draft consisted of 10 rounds comprising the selection of 178 players.

== Draft selections and draftee career notes ==
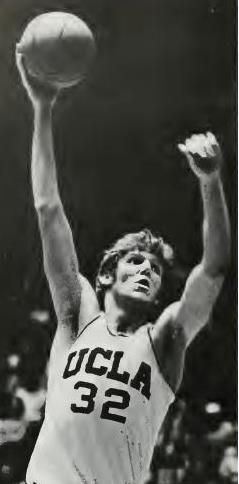
Bill Walton was selected first overall by the Portland Trail Blazers.

Bill Walton, from the University of California Los Angeles, was selected first overall by the Portland Trail Blazers. Jamaal Wilkes (then known as Keith Wilkes), also from UCLA, was selected eleventh by the Golden State Warriors and went on to win the Rookie of the Year Award. Walton, Wilkes, and fortieth pick George Gervin have been inducted to the Basketball Hall of Fame. Both Walton and Gervin were also named to the list of the 50 Greatest Players in NBA History announced at the league's 50th anniversary in 1996. Walton won the NBA championship, along with the Finals Most Valuable Player Award, with the Blazers in 1977. Later in his career, he won another NBA title with the Boston Celtics in 1986. During that season, he also won the Sixth Man of the Year Award. Walton's other achievements include one Most Valuable Player Award in 1978, two All-NBA Team selections and two All-Star Game selections. Gervin had left college in 1972 to play professionally in the American Basketball Association (ABA) with the Virginia Squires. He later joined the NBA in 1976 after both leagues merged. His achievements include two All-ABA Team selections, seven All-NBA Team selections, three ABA All-Star Game selections and nine NBA All-Star Game selections.

Jamaal Wilkes won four NBA championships, one with the Golden State Warriors and three with the Los Angeles Lakers, and was selected to three All-Star Games. Maurice Lucas, the 14th pick, was selected to one All-NBA Team and four All-Star Games. He also won the NBA championship in 1977 with the Trail Blazers. Truck Robinson, the 22nd pick, and Phil Smith, the 29th pick, were selected to one All-NBA Team and two All-Star Games each. Bobby Jones, the 5th pick, initially opted to play in the ABA. He played two seasons in the ABA before finally joined the NBA with the Denver Nuggets when both leagues merged. His achievements include an NBA championship with the 76ers in 1983, one All-ABA Team selection, one ABA All-Star Game selection, four NBA All-Star Game selections, nine NBA All-Defensive Team selections and one Sixth Man of The Year Award. Five other players from this draft, 6th pick Scott Wedman, 8th pick Campy Russell, 12th pick Brian Winters, 21st pick Billy Knight and 25th pick John Drew, were also selected to at least one All-Star Game. Two players drafted went on to have coaching careers in the NBA: Brian Winters and 45th pick Kim Hughes.

== Key ==
Pos.	G	F	C
Position	Guard	Forward	Center

^	Denotes player who has been inducted to the Naismith Memorial Basketball Hall of Fame
*	Denotes player who has been selected for at least one All-Star Game and All-NBA Team
^{+}	Denotes player who has been selected for at least one All-Star Game
^{#}	Denotes player who has never appeared in an NBA regular-season or playoff game
^{~}	Denotes player who has been selected as Rookie of the Year

== Draft ==
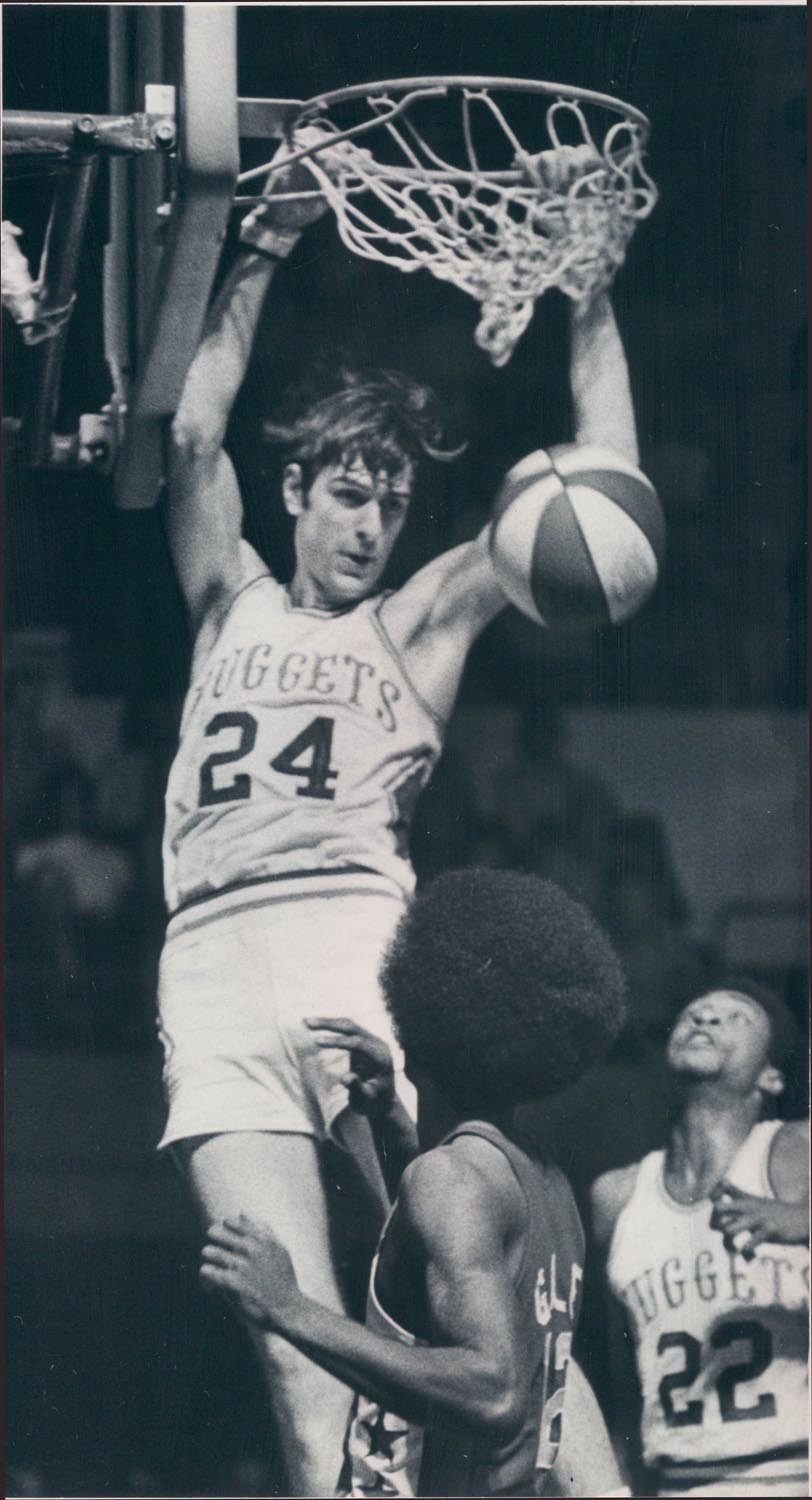
Bobby Jones was selected 5th overall by the Houston Rockets.

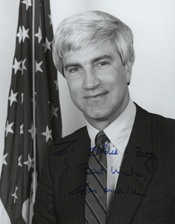
Tom McMillen was selected 9th overall by the Buffalo Braves.

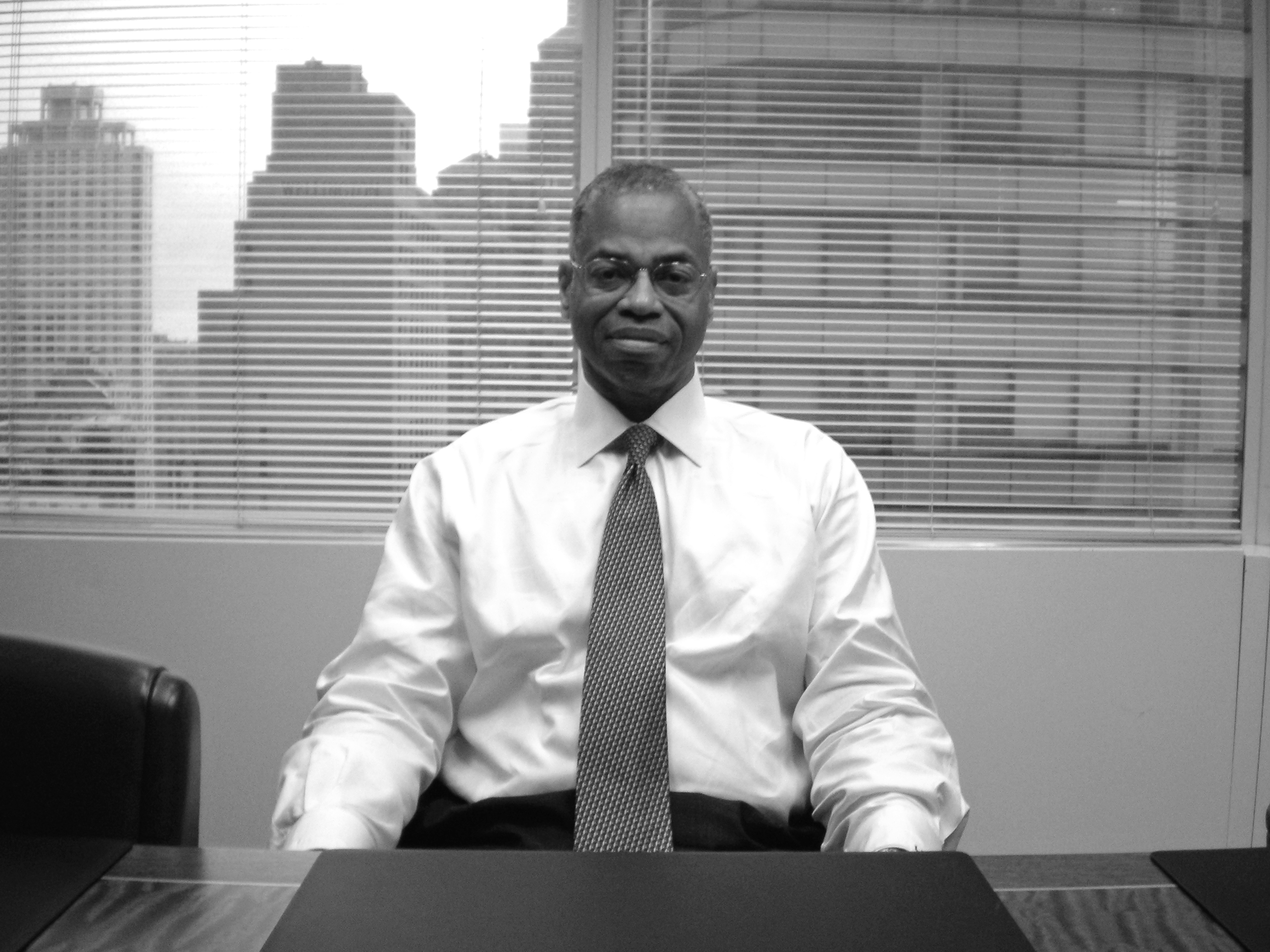
Len Elmore was selected 13th overall by the Washington Bullets.

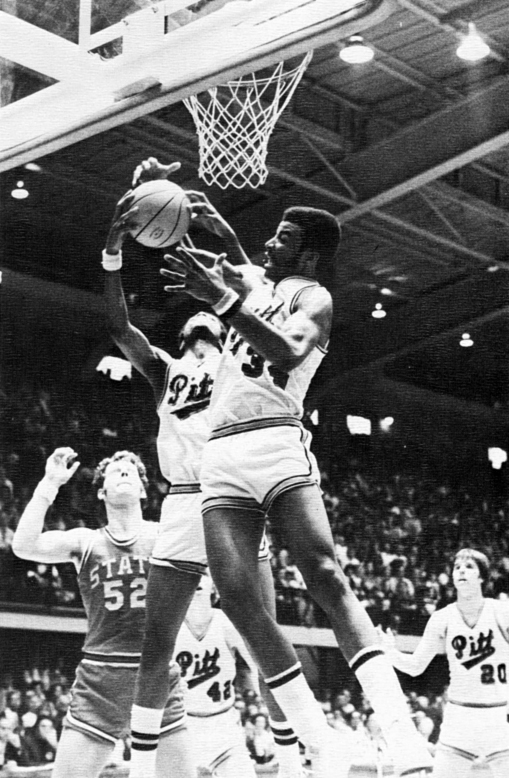
Billy Knight (center) was selected 21st overall by the Los Angeles Lakers.

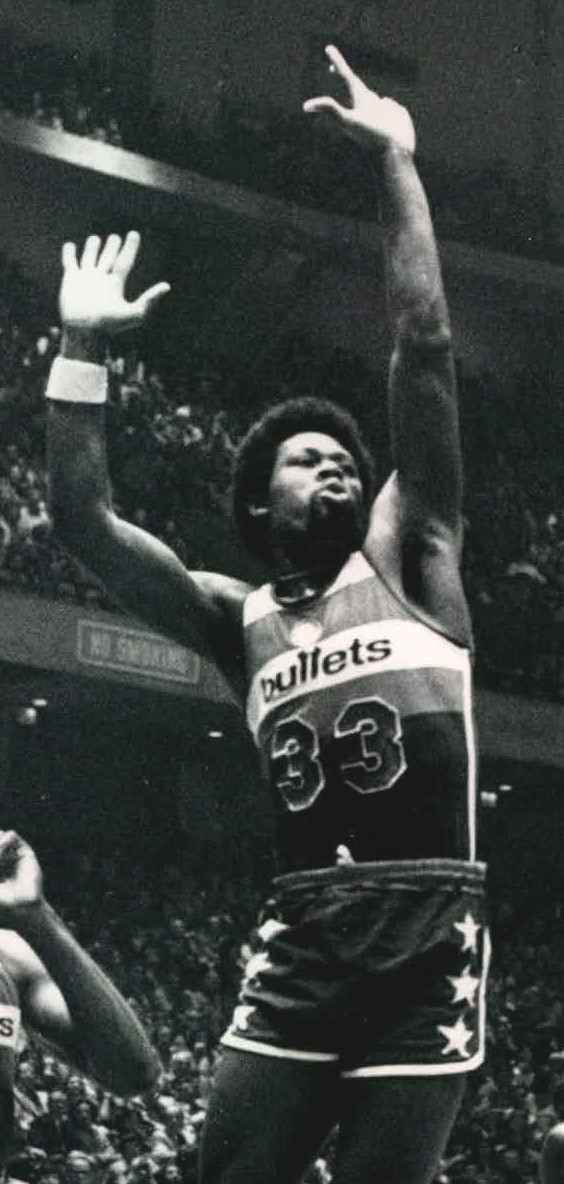
Truck Robinson was selected 22nd overall by the Washington Bullets.

Rnd.	Pick	Player	Pos.	Nationality (Note: Nationality indicates the player's national team or representative nationality. If a player has not competed at the international level, then the nationality indicates the national team which the player is eligible to represent according to FIBA rules.)	Team	School / club team
1	1	Bill Walton^	F/C	United States	Portland Trail Blazers	UCLA (Sr.)
1	2	Marvin Barnes	F/C	United States	Philadelphia 76ers	Providence (Sr.)
1	3	Tommy Burleson	C	United States	Seattle SuperSonics (from Cleveland)^{[a]}	North Carolina State (Sr.)
1	4	John Shumate	F/C	United States	Phoenix Suns	Notre Dame (Sr.) (Note: Even though John Shumate was a senior, he had one extra year of college eligibility remaining after he missed his sophomore year due to an illness. However, he decided to pass up his final year to enter the draft.)
1	5	Bobby Jones^	F	United States	Houston Rockets	North Carolina (Sr.)
1	6	Scott Wedman^{+}	G/F	United States	Kansas City-Omaha Kings	Colorado (Sr.)
1	7	Tom Henderson	G	United States	Atlanta Hawks	Hawaii (Sr.)
1	8	Campy Russell^{+}	F	United States	Cleveland Cavaliers (from Seattle)^{[a]}	Michigan (Jr.)
1	9	Tom McMillen	F/C	United States	Buffalo Braves	Maryland (Sr.)
1	10	Mike Sojourner	F/C	United States	Atlanta Hawks (from New Orleans)^{[b]}	Utah (So.)
1	11	Keith Wilkes^^{~} (Note: Keith Wilkes changed his name into Jamaal Abdul-Lateef prior to the start of the season. However, he retained his surname throughout his NBA career and is commonly known as Jamaal Wilkes.)	G/F	United States	Golden State Warriors	UCLA (Sr.)
1	12	Brian Winters^{+}	G/F	United States	Los Angeles Lakers	South Carolina (Sr.)
1	13	Len Elmore	F/C	United States	Washington Bullets	Maryland (Sr.)
1	14	Maurice Lucas*	F/C	United States	Chicago Bulls (from New York)^{[c]}	Marquette (Jr.)
1	15	Al Eberhard	F	United States	Detroit Pistons	Missouri (Sr.)
1	16	Cliff Pondexter	F/C	United States	Chicago Bulls	Long Beach State (Fr.)
1	17	Glenn McDonald	G/F	United States	Boston Celtics	Long Beach State (Sr.)
1	18	Gary Brokaw	G	United States	Milwaukee Bucks	Notre Dame (Jr.)
2	19	Don Smith	G	United States	Philadelphia 76ers	Dayton (Sr.)
2	20	Jan van Breda Kolff	G/F	United States	Portland Trail Blazers	Vanderbilt (Sr.)
2	21	Billy Knight^{+}	G/F	United States	Los Angeles Lakers (from Cleveland)^{[d]}	Pittsburgh (Sr.)
2	22	Truck Robinson*	F/C	United States	Washington Bullets (from Phoenix via Los Angeles)^{[e]}	Tennessee State (Sr.)
2	23	Gus Bailey	G/F	United States	Houston Rockets	Texas-El Paso (Sr.)
2	24	Len Kosmalski	C	United States	Kansas City-Omaha Kings	Tennessee (Sr.)
2	25	John Drew^{+}	G/F	United States	Atlanta Hawks	Gardner–Webb (So.)
2	26	Leonard Gray	F	United States	Seattle SuperSonics	Long Beach State (Sr.)
2	27	Leon Benbow	G	United States	Chicago Bulls (from Buffalo)^{[f]}	Jacksonville (Sr.)
2	28	Aaron James	F	United States	New Orleans Jazz	Grambling (Sr.)
2	29	Phil Smith*	G	United States	Golden State Warriors	San Francisco (Sr.)
2	30	Dennis DuVal	G	United States	Washington Bullets	Syracuse (Sr.)
2	31	Fred Saunders	F	United States	Phoenix Suns (from Los Angeles)^{[g]}	Syracuse (Sr.)
2	32	Jesse Dark	G	United States	New York Knicks	Virginia Commonwealth (Sr.)
2	33	Eric Money	G	United States	Detroit Pistons	Arizona (Jr.)
2	34	Phil Lumpkin	G	United States	Portland Trail Blazers (from Chicago)^{[h]}	Miami (Ohio) (Sr.)
2	35	Kevin Stacom	G	United States	Boston Celtics	Providence (Sr.)
2	36	Rubin Collins^{#}	G	United States	Portland Trail Blazers (from Milwaukee via Philadelphia)^{[i]}	Maryland Eastern Shore (Jr.)
3	37	Coniel Norman	G	United States	Philadelphia 76ers	Arizona (So.)
3	38	Foots Walker	G	United States	Cleveland Cavaliers (from Portland)^{[j]}	West Georgia (Sr.)
3	39	Kevin Restani	F/C	United States	Cleveland Cavaliers	San Francisco (Sr.)
3	40	George Gervin^	G/F	United States	Phoenix Suns	Virginia Squires (ABA)
3	41	Robert Wilson^{#}	F	United States	Houston Rockets	Iowa State (Sr.)
3	42	Harvey Catchings	F/C	United States	Philadelphia 76ers (from Kansas City–Omaha)^{[k]}	Hardin–Simmons (Sr.)
3	43	Darrell Elston	G	United States	Atlanta Hawks	North Carolina (Sr.)
3	44	Talvin Skinner	G/F	United States	Seattle SuperSonics	Maryland Eastern Shore (Sr.)
3	45	Kim Hughes	C	United States	Buffalo Braves	Wisconsin (Sr.)
3	46	Bruce King^{#}	G	United States	New Orleans Jazz	Pan American (Sr.)
3	47	Frank Kendrick	F	United States	Golden State Warriors	Purdue (Sr.)
3	48	Jim Bradley^{#}	F	United States	Los Angeles Lakers	Kentucky Colonels (ABA)
3	49	Earl Williams	F/C	United States	Phoenix Suns (from Washington)^{[l]}	Winston-Salem State (Sr.)
3	50	Rudy Jackson^{#}	F	United States	New York Knicks	Wichita State (So.)
3	51	Roland Grant^{#}	C	United States	Detroit Pistons	New Mexico State (Sr.)
3	52	Bobby Wilson	G	United States	Chicago Bulls	Wichita State (Sr.)
3	53	Roscoe Pondexter^{#}	F	United States	Boston Celtics	Long Beach State (Jr.)
3	54	Greg McDonald^{#}	F	United States	Milwaukee Bucks	Oral Roberts (Sr.)
4	55	Butch Taylor^{#}	C	United States	Philadelphia 76ers	Jacksonville (Sr.)
4	56	Mickey Johnson	F	United States	Portland Trail Blazers	Aurora (Sr.)
4	57	Jimmy Foster^{#}	G	United States	Cleveland Cavaliers	UConn (Sr.)
4	58	Randy Allen^{#}	G	United States	Phoenix Suns	IUP (Sr.)
4	59	Larry Robinson^{#}	F	United States	Houston Rockets	Texas (Sr.)
4	60	Lloyd Batts^{#}	G	United States	Kansas City–Omaha Kings	Cincinnati (Sr.)
4	61	Ed Palubinskas^{#}	G	Australia	Atlanta Hawks	LSU (Sr.)
4	62	William Gordon^{#}	G	United States	Seattle SuperSonics	Maryland Eastern Shore (Sr.)
4	63	Bernie Harris	F	United States	Buffalo Braves	Virginia Commonwealth (Sr.)
4	64	Ray Price^{#}	F	United States	New Orleans Jazz	Washington (Sr.)
4	65	Willie Biles^{#}	G	United States	Golden State Warriors	Tulsa (Sr.)
4	66	Stan Washington	G	United States	Washington Bullets	San Diego State (Sr.)
4	67	Ron deVries^{#}	C	United States	Los Angeles Lakers	Illinois State (Sr.)
4	68	Roy Ebron^{#}	C	United States	New York Knicks	Southwestern Louisiana (Sr.)
4	69	Mickey Martin^{#}	F	United States	Detroit Pistons	Pittsburgh (Sr.)
4	70	James Forbes^{#}	F	United States	Chicago Bulls	UTEP (Sr.)
4	71	Lerman Battle^{#}	F	United States	Boston Celtics	Fairmont State (Sr.)
4	72	Lionel Billingy^{#}	F	United States	Milwaukee Bucks	Duquesne (Sr.)
5	73	Gary Crowthers^{#}	F	United States	Philadelphia 76ers	Hardin–Simmons (Sr.)
5	74	Bernard Hardin^{#}	F	United States	Portland Trail Blazers	New Mexico (Sr.)
5	75	Gary Novak^{#}	F	United States	Cleveland Cavaliers	Notre Dame (Sr.)
5	76	Ralph Bobik^{#}	F	United States	Phoenix Suns	Creighton (Sr.)
5	77	Owen Wells	F	United States	Houston Rockets	Detroit (Sr.)
5	78	Terry Compton^{#}	G	United States	Kansas City–Omaha Kings	Vanderbilt (Sr.)
5	79	Tyrone Medley^{#}	G	United States	Atlanta Hawks	Utah (Sr.)
5	80	Dean Tolson	F	United States	Seattle SuperSonics	Arkansas (Sr.)
5	81	Tony Byers^{#}	G	United States	Buffalo Braves	Wake Forest (Sr.)
5	82	Ed Searcy	F	United States	New Orleans Jazz	St. John's (Sr.)
5	83	Steve Erickson^{#}	C	United States	Golden State Warriors	Oregon State (Sr.)
5	84	Seymour Reed^{#}	F	United States	Los Angeles Lakers	Bradley (Sr.)
5	85	Gary Anderson^{#}	G	United States	Washington Bullets	Wisconsin (Sr.)
5	86	Greg Jackson	G	United States	New York Knicks	Guilford (Sr.)
5	87	Joe Newman^{#}	F	United States	Detroit Pistons	Temple (Sr.)
5	88	Randy Knowles^{#}	F	United States	Chicago Bulls	Texas A&M (Sr.)
5	89	Ben Clyde	F	United States	Boston Celtics	Florida State (Sr.)
5	90	John Johnson^{#}	F	United States	Milwaukee Bucks	Denver (Sr.)
6	91	Mike Westra^{#}	F	United States	Philadelphia 76ers	USC (Sr.)
6	92	Daniel Anderson	G	United States	Portland Trail Blazers	USC (Sr.)
6	93	Aron Stewart^{#}	G	United States	Cleveland Cavaliers	Richmond (Sr.)
6	94	Collis Temple^{#}	F	United States	Phoenix Suns	LSU (Sr.)
6	95	Lawrence Johnson^{#}	F	United States	Houston Rockets	Prairie View A&M (Sr.)
6	96	Ron Kennedy^{#}	C	United States	Kansas City–Omaha Kings	Arizona State (Sr.)
6	97	Sam Hervey^{#}	F	United States	Atlanta Hawks	SMU (Sr.)
6	98	Wardell Jackson	F	United States	Seattle SuperSonics	Ohio State (Sr.)
6	99	Gary Link^{#}	F	United States	Buffalo Braves	Missouri (Sr.)
6	100	Lawrence McCray^{#}	C	United States	New Orleans Jazz	Florida State (Sr.)
6	101	John Errecart^{#}	G	United States	Golden State Warriors	Pacific (California) (Sr.)
6	102	Roy McPipe^{#}	G	United States	Washington Bullets	Montana State Billings (Sr.)
6	103	Billy Morris^{#}	F	United States	Los Angeles Lakers	Saint Louis (Sr.)
6	104	Terry Mikan^{#}	F	United States	New York Knicks	St. Thomas (Minnesota) (Sr.)
6	105	Mike Sylvester^{#}	F	United States (Note: Sylvester became an Italian citizen in 1977 and played for the Italian national team.)	Detroit Pistons	Dayton (Sr.)
6	106	Robert Rosier^{#}	C	United States	Chicago Bulls	St. Thomas (Minnesota) (Sr.)
6	107	Gene Harmon^{#}	F	United States	Boston Celtics	Creighton (Sr.)
6	108	Larry Williams^{#}	F	United States	Milwaukee Bucks	Kansas State (Sr.)
7	109	Dave Stoczynski^{#}	F	United States	Philadelphia 76ers	Gannon (Sr.)
7	110	Doug Richards^{#}	G	United States	Portland Trail Blazers	BYU (Sr.)
7	111	Mike Robinson^{#}	G	United States	Cleveland Cavaliers	Michigan State (Sr.)
7	112	Clyde Dickey^{#}	G	United States	Phoenix Suns	Boise State (Sr.)
7	113	Kevin Fitzgerald^{#}	G	United States	Houston Rockets	Oklahoma State (Sr.)
7	114	Mark Brown^{#}	F	United States	Kansas City–Omaha Kings	Missouri Western State (Sr.)
7	115	Greg Lee	G	United States	Atlanta Hawks	UCLA (Sr.)
7	116	Jerry Faulkner^{#}	G	United States	Seattle SuperSonics	West Georgia (Sr.)
7	117	Tommy Curtis^{#}	G	United States	Buffalo Braves	UCLA (Sr.)
7	118	Joel Copeland^{#}	F	United States	New Orleans Jazz	Old Dominion (Sr.)
7	119	Brady Allen^{#}	G	United States	Golden State Warriors	California (Sr.)
7	120	Dennis Van Zant^{#}	F	United States	Los Angeles Lakers	Azusa (Sr.)
7	121	Tom Turner^{#}	G	United States	Washington Bullets	West Georgia (Sr.)
7	122	Billy Smith^{#}	F	United States	New York Knicks	Mercer (Sr.)
7	123	Sammy High^{#}	F	United States	Detroit Pistons	Tulsa (Sr.)
7	124	Geoff Roberts^{#}	F	United States	Chicago Bulls	Missouri Western State (Sr.)
7	125	Ron Brown^{#}	G	United States	Boston Celtics	Penn State (Sr.)
7	126	Bob Hornstein^{#}	F	United States	Milwaukee Bucks	West Virginia (Sr.)
8	127	Jimmy Powell^{#}	F	United States	Philadelphia 76ers	Middle Tennessee (Sr.)
8	128	Eldridge Broussard^{#}	G	United States	Portland Trail Blazers	Pacific (Oregon) (Sr.)
8	129	Kerry Hughes^{#}	F	United States	Cleveland Cavaliers	Wisconsin (Sr.)
8	130	Tom Holland^{#}	F	United States	Phoenix Suns	Oklahoma (Sr.)
8	131	Steve Brooks^{#}	F	United States	Houston Rockets	Arkansas State (Sr.)
8	132	Richie O'Connor^{#}	G	United States	Kansas City–Omaha Kings	Fairfield (Sr.)
8	133	Bill Butler^{#}	G	United States	Atlanta Hawks	Louisville (Sr.)
8	134	Leonard Coulter^{#}	F	United States	Seattle SuperSonics	Morehead State (Sr.)
8	135	Glenn Price^{#}	F	United States	Buffalo Braves	St. Bonaventure (Sr.)
8	136	Jay Piccola^{#}	F	United States	New Orleans Jazz	Roanoke (Sr.)
8	137	Clarence Allen^{#}	F	United States	Golden State Warriors	UC Santa Barbara (Sr.)
8	138	Steve Platt^{#}	F	United States	Washington Bullets	Huntington (Sr.)
8	139	Bob Florence^{#}	G	United States	Los Angeles Lakers	UNLV (Sr.)
8	140	Dennis McDermott^{#}	F	United States	New York Knicks	St. Francis Brooklyn (Sr.)
8	141	Greg Newman^{#}	G	United States	Detroit Pistons	Drexel (Sr.)
8	142	Sam McCants^{#}	G	United States	Chicago Bulls	Oral Roberts (Jr.)
8	143	Richard Wallace^{#}	G	United States	Boston Celtics	Georgia Southern (Sr.)
8	144	Ralph Palomar^{#}	F	Mexico	Milwaukee Bucks	Cameron (Sr.)
9	145	Perry Warbington	G	United States	Philadelphia 76ers	Georgia Southern (Sr.)
9	146	Lee Haven^{#}	G	United States	Portland Trail Blazers	Colorado (Sr.)
9	147	Jim Bushkofsky^{#}	F	United States	Cleveland Cavaliers	Upper Iowa (Sr.)
9	148	Ted Evans^{#}	F	United States	Phoenix Suns	Oklahoma (Sr.)
9	149	Ken Stalling^{#}	G	United States	Houston Rockets	Missouri–Rolla (Sr.)
9	150	Jeff Dawson^{#}	G	United States	Kansas City–Omaha Kings	Illinois (Sr.)
9	151	Lon Kruger^{#}	G	United States	Atlanta Hawks	Kansas State (Sr.)
9	152	Bertram du Pont^{#}	G	United States	Seattle SuperSonics	Dillard (Sr.)
9	153	John Falconi^{#}	G	United States	Buffalo Braves	Davidson (Sr.)
9	154	Ken Boyd	F	United States	New Orleans Jazz	Boston University (Sr.)
9	155	Carl Meier^{#}	F	United States	Golden State Warriors	California (Sr.)
9	156	Mark Raterink^{#}	F	United States	Washington Bullets	Boston College (Sr.)
9	157	Earl Brown^{#}	F	Puerto Rico	New York Knicks	Lafayette (Sr.)
9	158	Gary Deitelhoff^{#}	F	United States	Detroit Pistons	Millikin (Sr.)
9	159	Jerry Davenport^{#}	G	United States	Chicago Bulls	Cameron (Sr.)
9	160	Al Skinner	G	United States	Boston Celtics	Massachusetts (Sr.)
9	161	Mike Deane^{#}	G	United States	Milwaukee Bucks	SUNY Potsdam (Sr.)
10	162	Larry Witherspoon^{#}	G	United States	Philadelphia 76ers	Towson (Sr.)
10	163	Ron Jones^{#}	G	United States	Portland Trail Blazers	Oregon State (Sr.)
10	164	Jim Kelly^{#}	G	United States	Cleveland Cavaliers	Loras (Sr.)
10	165	Mark Wasley^{#}	F	United States	Phoenix Suns	Arizona State (Sr.)
10	166	Marcus Washington^{#}	G	United States	Houston Rockets	Marquette (Sr.)
10	167	Dennis White^{#}	F	United States	Kansas City–Omaha Kings	Arkansas (Sr.)
10	168	Brendy Lee^{#}	F	United States	Atlanta Hawks	Nebraska (Sr.)
10	169	Rod Derline	G	United States	Seattle SuperSonics	Seattle (Sr.)
10	170	Andy Rimol^{#}	F	United States	Buffalo Braves	Princeton (Sr.)
10	171	Walt McGary^{#}	F	United States	New Orleans Jazz	Chattanooga (Sr.)
10	172	Marvin Buckley^{#}	G	United States	Golden State Warriors	Nevada (Sr.)
10	173	Pete Collins^{#}	F	United States	Washington Bullets	High Point (Sr.)
10	174	John O'Donnell^{#}	F	United States	New York Knicks	North Carolina (Sr.)
10	175	Bill Ligon	G	United States	Detroit Pistons	Vanderbilt (Sr.)
10	176	Rick Hockenos^{#}	F	United States	Chicago Bulls	Saint Francis (Pennsylvania) (Sr.)
10	177	Phil Rogers^{#}	F	United States	Boston Celtics	Fairfield (Sr.)
10	178	Bruce Featherston^{#}	C	United States	Milwaukee Bucks	Texas State (Sr.)
Supp.	–	Aulcie Perry^{#}	C	United States (Note: Perry became an Israeli citizen in 1978.)	Boston Celtics	Bethune–Cookman (Jr.)
Supp.	–	Tony Jenkins^{#}	F	United States	Boston Celtics	Harvard (Sr.)
Supp.	–	Jerry Baskerville	F	United States	Boston Celtics	Temple (Jr.)
Supp.	–	Fred Petty^{#}	C	United Kingdom	Boston Celtics	New Hampshire College (Sr.)

== Trades ==
- ^{a 1} ^{2} On the draft-day, the Seattle SuperSonics acquired a first-round pick from the Cleveland Cavaliers in exchange for Dick Snyder and a first-round pick. The Sonics used the pick to draft Tommy Burleson. The Cavaliers used the pick to draft Campy Russell.
- ^{b} On May 20, 1974, the Atlanta Hawks acquired Bob Kauffman, Dean Meminger, the tenth pick, a 1975 first-round pick, 1975 and 1976 second-round picks, and a 1980 third-round pick from the New Orleans Jazz in exchange for Pete Maravich. The Hawks used the pick to draft Mike Sojourner.
- ^{c} On the draft-day, the Chicago Bulls acquired a first-round pick from the New York Knicks in exchange for Howard Porter and a 1975 second-round pick. The Bulls used the pick to draft Maurice Lucas.
- ^{d} On August 31, 1972, the Los Angeles Lakers acquired a second-round pick from the Cleveland Cavaliers in exchange for Jim Cleamons. The Lakers used the pick to draft Billy Knight.
- ^{e} On August 23, 1973, the Washington Bullets (as the Capital Bullets) acquired a second-round pick from the Los Angeles Lakers in exchange for Stan Love. Previously, the Lakers acquired the pick on September 19, 1972, from the Phoenix Suns in exchange for Paul Stovall. The Bullets used the pick to draft Truck Robinson.
- ^{f} On September 10, 1973, the Chicago Bulls acquired John Hummer and a second-round pick from the Buffalo Braves in exchange for Gar Heard, Kevin Kunnert and a 1975 second-round pick. The Bulls used the pick to draft Leon Benbow.
- ^{g} On October 30, 1973, the Phoenix Suns acquired Keith Erickson and a second-round pick from the Los Angeles Lakers in exchange for Connie Hawkins. The Suns used the pick to draft Fred Saunders.
- ^{h} On October 14, 1973, the Portland Trail Blazers acquired a second-round pick from the Chicago Bulls in exchange for Rick Adelman. The Blazers used the pick to draft Phil Lumpkin.
- ^{i} On September 11, 1972, the Portland Trail Blazers acquired a second-round pick from the Philadelphia 76ers as compensation for the signing of Gary Gregor as a free agent. Previously, the 76ers acquired the pick and future consideration (the 76ers acquired John Block on July 28, 1972) on December 13, 1971, from the Milwaukee Bucks in exchange for Wali Jones. The Blazers used the pick to draft Rubin Collins.
- ^{j} On October 24, 1972, the Cleveland Cavaliers acquired a third-round pick from the Portland Trail Blazers in exchange for Charlie Davis. The Cavaliers used the pick to draft Foots Walker.
- ^{k} On January 26, 1973, the Philadelphia 76ers acquired Tom Van Arsdale and a third-round pick from the Kansas City-Omaha Kings in exchange for John Block. The 76ers used the pick to draft Harvey Catchings.
- ^{l} On October 9, 1973, the Phoenix Suns acquired 1974 and 1975 third-round picks from the Washington Bullets (as the Capital Bullets) in exchange for Walt Wesley. The Suns used the pick to draft Earl Williams.

== Early entrants ==
=== College underclassmen ===
For the fourth year in a row, the NBA would implement the hardship exception for college underclassmen to enter the NBA draft. This season had 20 different players initially declare their entry into this year's draft, but eight of these players in the University of Oklahoma's Alvan Adams, UNLV's Jimmie Baker, the University of Utah's Luther Burden, the University of West Florida's David Mitchell Jr., St. John's Mel Utley, Southeastern Community College's Michael Washington, Jacksonville University's Henry Williams, and Austin Peay State University's James Williams would all later skip out on official entry into this year's draft. The following college basketball players successfully applied for an NBA hardship.

- (United States) Gary Brokaw – G, Notre Dame (junior)
- (United States) Rubin Collins – G, Maryland Eastern Shore (junior)
- (United States) John Drew – F, Gardner–Webb (sophomore)
- (United States) Rudy Jackson – Hutchinson CC (sophomore)
- (United States) Maurice Lucas – F, Marquette (junior)
- (United States) Eric Money – G, Arizona (junior)
- (United States) Coniel Norman – G, Arizona (sophomore)
- (United States) Cliff Pondexter – F/C, Long Beach State (freshman)
- (United States) Roscoe Pondexter – Long Beach State (junior)
- (United States) Campy Russell – Michigan (junior)
- (United States) Mike Sojourner – Utah (sophomore)
- (United States) Bobby Taylor – F, Cal State L.A. (freshman)

== See also ==
- List of first overall NBA draft picks
