= Jesse Dark =

American basketball player (born 1951)

Personal information
- Born: September 2, 1951 (age 75) Richmond, Virginia, U.S.
- Listed height: 6 ft 5 in (1.96 m)
- Listed weight: 210 lb (95 kg)

Career information
- High school: Maggie Walker (Richmond, Virginia)
- College: VCU (1970–1974)
- NBA draft: 1974: 2nd round, 32nd overall pick
- Drafted by: New York Knicks
- Position: Shooting guard
- Number: 11

Career history
- 1974–1975: New York Knicks
- Stats at NBA.com
- Stats at Basketball Reference

Jesse L. Dark (born September 2, 1951, in Richmond, Virginia) is an American former professional basketball shooting guard who spent one season in the National Basketball Association (NBA) with the New York Knicks during the 1974–75 season. The Knicks drafted Dark from the Virginia Commonwealth University during the 1974 NBA draft in the second round (32nd pick overall).

== Career statistics ==
Legend
| GP | Games played | GS | Games started | MPG | Minutes per game |
| FG% | Field goal percentage | 3P% | 3-point field goal percentage | FT% | Free throw percentage |
| RPG | Rebounds per game | APG | Assists per game | SPG | Steals per game |
| BPG | Blocks per game | PPG | Points per game | **Bold** | Career high |

=== NBA ===
==== Regular season ====
| Year | Team | GP | GS | MPG | FG% | FT% | RPG | APG | SPG | BPG | PPG |
|---|---|---|---|---|---|---|---|---|---|---|---|
| 1974–75 | New York | 47 | 0 | 8.5 | .471 | .550 | .8 | .6 | .1 | .0 | 3.6 |

==== Playoffs ====
| Year | Team | GP | MPG | FG% | FT% | RPG | APG | SPG | BPG | PPG |
|---|---|---|---|---|---|---|---|---|---|---|
| 1975 | New York | 2 | 5.5 | .167 | 1.000 | .5 | .5 | .0 | .0 | 3.5 |
