= Lionel Billingy =

American basketball player and coach (born 1952)

Personal information
- Born: August 31, 1952 (age 74)
- Listed height: 6 ft 9 in (2.06 m)
- Listed weight: 215 lb (98 kg)

Career information
- High school: Our Saviour Lutheran (Bronx, New York)
- College: Duquesne (1971–1974)
- NBA draft: 1974: 4th round, 72nd overall pick
- Drafted by: Milwaukee Bucks
- Playing career: 1974–1982
- Position: Power forward
- Number: 52

Career history
- 1974–1975: Virginia Squires
- 1975: Allentown Jets
- 1975–1978: AS Berck
- 1978–1979: Liège
- 1980–1982: Caen

Career highlights
- EBA champion (1975)
- Stats at Basketball Reference

Lionel "Big Train" Billingy (born August 31, 1952) is a retired American basketball player and a basketball coach.

He played collegiately for the Duquesne University.

He was drafted by, and played for, the Virginia Squires (1974–75) in the American Basketball Association for 46 games.

As of 2006, he lives in Switzerland, where he coaches, holds youth basketball camps and works as a preacher.
