= 1975–76 Virginia Squires season =

ABA basketball team season

- Head coach: Al Bianchi (1–6); Mack Calvin (0–6); Bill Musselman (4–22); Jack Ankerson (1–1); Zelmo Beaty (9–33)
- Arena: Norfolk Scope; Hampton Roads Coliseum; Richmond Coliseum

Results
- Record: 15–68 (.181)
- Place: Division: 4th Conference: 7th
- Playoff finish: did not qualify

Local media
- Television: WAVY 10
- Radio: WTAR

The 1975–76 Virginia Squires season was the sixth and final season of the Squires in the American Basketball Association, as well as ninth and final season of the team as a whole when including their seasons under the Oakland Oaks and Washington Caps names. This season saw the Squires finish in last place in the league, tying the record they set the year before for the worst record in ABA history in terms of wins, missing only one game to avoid a complete tie overall. They also had a record of 11–75 during the 1975 year when combining their previous season and this season together. Despite completing the regular season, Virginia constantly faced rumored threats of them being the next team to fold operations in the ABA throughout the entire season after the Baltimore Claws, San Diego Sails, and Utah Stars folded operations in the last three months of 1975. However, the Squires' financial troubles ultimately led to their dissolution just a month after the end of the regular season (specifically two days before the conclusion of the 1976 ABA Playoffs). As a result, the Squires were not part of the ABA-NBA merger that occurred at the conclusion of the season, nor did the Squires' players get involved with any dispersal drafts by either the ABA or the NBA via the 1976 ABA dispersal draft. An entire chapter in Loose Balls was dedicated to this team's season and their plights and ultimate demise (with the book mentioning that they almost folded at least six different times before they actually did so), with its significant details being written by the memories of the people that lived through that season, old news clippings during the season (including the off-season and preseason periods), and through the diary entries of Virginia Squires radio broadcaster Warner Fusselle.

== Offseason ==
=== ABA Draft ===
Round	Pick	Player	Position(s)	Nationality	College
1	2	David Thompson	SG	United States	North Carolina State
1	10	Mel Bennett	PF	United States	Maryland
2	12	Jimmy Dan Conner	SG	United States	Kentucky
4	32	Luther Burden	SG	United States	Utah
4	36	Fessor Leonard	C	United States	Furman
5	42	Richard Jones	SG/SF	United States	Virginia Commonwealth
6	52	Fletcher Johnson Jr.	SF	United States	Randolph–Macon
7	62	Bill Bunton	C/PF	United States	Louisville
8	72	Ricky Coleman	SG	United States	Jacksonville

The Virginia Squires would technically obtain the second straight #1 pick in the ABA draft after previously having one in the prior draft if you don't count the Denver Nuggets' bonus round selection of Marvin Webster as the official #1 pick of the draft this time around. Technically speaking, David Thompson's selection by the Squires made him the only ABA draft pick from the final ABA draft ever held to not be directly drafted by the Denver Nuggets to make it to the 1976 ABA All-Star Game.

=== Early trials and tribulations ===
When Virginia made their first selection in what ultimately became the final American Basketball Association draft ever done on June 17, 1975, they chose to draft star shooting guard David Thompson from North Carolina State University, despite knowing that they didn't have the cash to sign him and that the Denver Nuggets could potentially acquire Thompson directly despite Virginia having his draft rights and them drafting a player that was previously selected by the Memphis Sounds back when they went by the Memphis Tams during the 1973 ABA draft period. Because of that, despite knowing that a player like Thompson would be exactly what the Squires needed (especially since he compared favorably to former Squires player Julius Erving at the time), his draft rights were traded alongside George Irvine for that of 5x ABA All-Star Mack Calvin, former ABA All-Star Mike Green, Jan van Breda Kolff, and $250,000 in cash on July 14 that year. While they were optimistic at the time that they would at least produce a lot better than they did last season (despite Calvin airing his grievances out against head coach Larry Brown for being traded to Virginia specifically), the optimism would quickly fade weeks later on July 27 when center David Vaughn Jr. was charged for multiple attempted murder charges with a vehicle alongside a hit-and-run and a reckless driving charge with a rented Mark IV after not paying for $14 worth of gasoline at a Shell gas station. (This incident happened a day after being arrested for an indecent exposure arrest at Virginia Beach and claims that "God is naked, too.") Following that incident, both Calvin and Green would be out for the start of the season due to injuries while Vaughn appeared in training camp despite awaiting trail for his charges (with friends claiming his divorce really wrecked things for him mentally). Days after Vaughn first reported to training camp on September 23, the Squires were hit with the first big bombshell of the ABA season that refabricated worries of survival going forward when the first report of two of the strongest ABA teams in the Denver Nuggets and New York Nets would jump ship from the ABA to the NBA early before the intended ABA-NBA merger occurred; the September 25 report not only sent out waves of shock and betrayal within the league, but also exposed internal struggles later on to where in addition to the Baltimore Claws, the Squires would be one of the first teams to fold if both teams left early. Luckily for them, the courts ordered the Nuggets and Nets to stay in the ABA for at least one more season first, ensuring the Squires' short-term survival. However, once the Claws folded following the two preseason games the Squires had against them, people within the ABA had thought the Virginia franchise would be the next team to fold as well, though they would still play their season all the same like the other teams had done at least early on.

=== Preseason transactions ===
- On July 14, 1975, the Squires traded George Irvine and the rights to David Thompson to the Denver Nuggets for Mike Green, Jan van Breda Kolff and Mack Calvin
- In July 1975 the Squires signed Mel Bennett and Ticky Burden

=== Preseason exhibition games ===
Like most ABA teams, the Squires played several preseason exhibition games against NBA opponents.

On October 1, 1975, the Squires lost to the Houston Rockets 117–112 in Norfolk. On October 4, 1975, the Squires lost to the Philadelphia 76ers 130–113 in Hampton; in that game Squires star Mack Calvin tore a knee tendon, putting him out of action for two months. On October 12, 1975, the Squires defeated the Chicago Bulls 105–102 in Norfolk; the Bulls later sued the Squires for failing to pay a $13,000 guarantee for the game.

Though the Squires were 1–2 against the NBA that year, the ABA finished 31–17 against the NBA that year. They were also the only ABA team to play some matches against the Baltimore Claws during the preseason before that team was forcefully closed five days before the start of the regular season. The Squires won both matches they had against the Claws.

== Roster ==
1975–76 Virginia Squires roster
Players

Pos.	No.	Player	Height	Weight	DOB	From
PF	34	Mel Bennett	6 ft 7 in (2.01 m)	200 lb (91 kg)	January 4, 1955	Pittsburgh
SG	15	Ticky Burden	6 ft 2 in (1.88 m)	185 lb (84 kg)	February 28, 1953	Utah
PG	20, 21	Mack Calvin	6 ft 0 in (1.83 m)	165 lb (75 kg)	July 27, 1947	USC
C	24	Rick Darnell	6 ft 10 in (2.08 m)	215 lb (98 kg)	January 1, 1953	San José State
C	33	Jim Eakins	6 ft 11 in (2.11 m)	215 lb (98 kg)	May 24, 1946	BYU
C	25	Gerald Govan	6 ft 10 in (2.08 m)	220 lb (100 kg)	January 2, 1942	St. Mary of the Plains College
C	22	Mike Green	6 ft 10 in (2.08 m)	200 lb (91 kg)	August 6, 1951	Louisiana Tech
PF	31	Mike Jackson	6 ft 7 in (2.01 m)	215 lb (98 kg)	July 31, 1949	Cal State LA
C	10	Swen Nater	6 ft 11 in (2.11 m)	240 lb (109 kg)	January 14, 1950	UCLA
SG	14	Johnny Neumann	6 ft 6 in (1.98 m)	200 lb (91 kg)	September 11, 1951	Mississippi
SF	14	Marv Roberts	6 ft 8 in (2.03 m)	200 lb (91 kg)	January 29, 1950	Utah State
SF	11	Billy Schaeffer	6 ft 5 in (1.96 m)	200 lb (91 kg)	December 11, 1951	St. John's
PG	1	Fatty Taylor	6 ft 0 in (1.83 m)	175 lb (79 kg)	March 13, 1946	La Salle
PG	13	Dave Twardzik	6 ft 1 in (1.85 m)	175 lb (79 kg)	September 20, 1950	Old Dominion
SF	32	Jan van Breda Kolff	6 ft 7 in (2.01 m)	195 lb (88 kg)	December 16, 1951	Vanderbilt
C	45	David Vaughn Jr.	6 ft 11 in (2.11 m)	220 lb (100 kg)	June 4, 1952	Oral Roberts
SF	42	Willie Wise	6 ft 5 in (1.96 m)	210 lb (95 kg)	March 3, 1947	Drake
PF	24	Joby Wright	6 ft 8 in (2.03 m)	220 lb (100 kg)	September 5, 1950	Indiana

Coaches
Head coach
- Al Bianchi
- Mack Calvin
- Bill Musselman
- Jack Ankerson
- Zelmo Beaty

Legend
- (DP) Unsigned draft pick
- (FA) Free agent
- (S) Suspended
- Injured

Roster

== Regular season ==
=== Season standings ===
Team	W	L	PCT.	GB
Denver Nuggets *	60	24	.714	—
**New York Nets** *	55	29	.655	5
San Antonio Spurs *	50	34	.595	10
Kentucky Colonels *	46	38	.548	14
Indiana Pacers *	39	45	.464	21
Spirits of St. Louis	35	49	.417	25
Virginia Squires ‡	15	68	.181	44
San Diego Sails †	3	8	.273	—
Utah Stars †	4	12	.250	—
Baltimore Claws †	0	0	.000	—

Asterisk (*) denotes playoff team
† did not survive the end of the season.
‡ did not survive by the end of the playoffs despite finishing the regular season.
Bold – ABA champions

=== Month by month ===
==== October 1975 ====
The Squires opened the 1975–76 season on October 24, 1975, with a 112–101 loss at home in Norfolk to the Indiana Pacers; Indiana's Billy Knight led all players with 36 points. Two nights later on the 26th the Squires lost in Louisville to the Kentucky Colonels, 130–112, despite Ticky Burden leading all scorers with 28. On October 28 the Squires lost at home to the San Antonio Spurs 108-103 despite Willie Wise leading all scorers with 27; 3,949 attended. On the 29th before 2,905 fans in Hampton the Squires lost in overtime to the Spirits of St. Louis, 104–100, despite Willie Wise again leading all scorers with 38. On October 31 Virginia lost on the road to the Utah Stars, 123–116. The Squires entered November with a record of 0–5.

==== November 1975 ====
The Squires opened November with their first win of the season, a 109–105 road victory over the San Diego Sails in which Ticky Burden led all scorers with 45 points. The following night the Squires lost on the road to the Spirits of St. Louis, 106–99. A diary entry by Warner Fusselle revealed that despite having to wake up by 5 A.M. after their win against San Diego, the team didn't arrive in St. Louis properly until 5 P.M. due to one of their planes being fogged in and another plane they had to catch refusing to wait for the team; after the team lost to St. Louis, when they tried to get back home to Norfolk, the team got stuck at the Chicago airport for a five hour delay while waiting to get back to Virginia, making it one of the most depressing and exhaustive days for the team ever. On November 3, 1975, head coach Al Bianchi was fired after a 1–6 start. Bianchi's firing would come directly from one of the bankers (named John) that was involved in a group of about 100 investors led by Van Cunningham, who owned a company that sold pre-made sandwiches to convenience stores and even had the team put a small sandwich logo on their uniforms to help advertise his business. Mack Calvin became the Squires player/coach on November 5, 1975. The Squires next game was a 118–104 loss before 4,334 fans at home to the San Diego Sails on November 5; Ticky Burden scored 40 points in Mack Calvin's debut as the Virginia head coach. On the 7th in Hampton the Squires lost to the Indiana Pacers 104–100 before 3,293 fans. On November 11 in Cincinnati the Squires lost to the Kentucky Colonels 128–106; Artis Gilmore, Louie Dampier and Johnny Neumann each scored 21. The next night in San Antonio the Squires lost to the Spurs 144–112 despite Ticky Burden leading all scorers with 27.

After Calvin went 0–6 he was replaced by former San Diego Sails coach Bill Musselman on November 19, 1975. Part of the reason why Calvin was fired as the interim head coach of the Squires after six games was because his first check as a head coach had bounced, with his attorney stating the team needed to make good on his check by a 10-day period or else face legal action. Despite saying they'd make good on the check, the next check sent in would bounce also, which led to his attorney sending the team another letter in response. After their loss to the Pacers on November 7, the Squires tried to get Nuggets assistant coach Doug Moe to become their new head coach, but failed in their efforts due to Moe enjoying his work with head coach Larry Brown. Furthermore, after Virginia lost to Kentucky on November 11, there were not only rumors of the Squires being the next ABA team to fold operations entirely, but also reports going on that former San Diego Sails head coach Bill Musselman would become their new head coach after the Sails folded operations that fateful day. During the second dispersal draft of the ABA season, the Squires had hoped to acquire Joe Caldwell as a cheap center that could help fill up the center role real well for them (costing only $50,000 that season), but the Kentucky Colonels would acquire Caldwell's services first before Virginia had the chance to do so, dealing a massive blow to morale and fears that the ABA would soon go down to only six competitive teams in the process after hearing rumblings go down with the Utah Stars and a potential merger on board with the Spirits of St. Louis. Despite the rumblings of folding soon, the team would be saved in the short-term once again due to Kirk Saunders leading a group of black investors to pledge $200,000 to the team alongside another group of investors putting in money to help make payroll for the team, though the players didn't practice for two days because they neither had a coach nor paychecks during that period of time. Musselman went 4–22 before being replaced.

November 21 saw the Utah Stars visit the Squires, and the Squires won 106–98 in front of 7,292 fans in Norfolk as Ticky Burden tallied a game-high 34 points. Unknowingly to mostly everyone else in the ABA, this would later become one of the last games the Stars would ever play in franchise history.

==== December 1975 ====
Once the Utah Stars folded operations on December 2, 1975 after failing to get a successful merger going with the Spirits of St. Louis, thus leaving only seven competing teams left in the ABA, the Squires would acquire Jim Eakins as the only former Stars player to not be bought by the Spirits from the Stars as a means to potentially help their roster out a bit and the ABA would abandon the divisional format that they previously used throughout their entire existence altogether for the rest of this season. However, during the same day that the Stars folded operations, reports of the franchise folding during the season grew stronger still due to not just the group of black investors led by Kirk Saunders not coming through with their investment by this point in time combined with paychecks for players still being late and the Squires players not being happy with the new head coach's coaching style after winning their first two games under him. Ten days after the Stars folded operations, rumored reports occurred of Squires players rebelling against coach Musselman, starting with their 110-107 loss to the Denver Nuggets that night with Musselman being ejected for saying Jess Kersey looked like a broad with the hairdo that he had (leading to Willie Wise coaching the team the rest of that night after Mack Calvin refused to do so), Luther Burden initially not showing up to play because he was upset before playing the rest of the game to score a team-high 23 points (21 in the second half), and constant delays of game with the new 24-second shot clock continually malfunctioning, one of Mel Bennett's dunks bending a rim to delay the game for 28 minutes straight, and fans pelting the floor with ice. After another loss to Denver on the 15th, the team had two major meetings on the 17th involving themselves: the first involved general manager Jack Ankerson talking with the front office on potentially taking pay cuts to save the team for the season, while the second involved league commissioner Dave DeBusschere and general counsel man Mike Goldberg urging the investment group of the Squires to still stick it out despite there being no guarantees that they would make it to the NBA. (Goldberg later claimed that the ownership group's thickheaded stubbornness was what likely kept the team floating for so long, to the point of being amazed that they even survived the entire season despite not knowing if they'd survive on a week by week basis.) On December 27, while losing to the Indiana Pacers in Norfolk, Warner Fusselle claimed a fan threw a rubber chicken at referee Ed Rush. A day after that, the Squires would lose to the Spirits of St. Louis, ending their 1975 year with an overall playing record of 11-75 when combining their two seasons together.

==== January 1976 ====
On January 7, 1976, Jim Eakins was traded to the New York Nets for Swen Nater and Billy Schaeffer. Later that same day, the Squires won 107-100 over the New York Nets in Norfolk, though that game was first protested on after the original January 7 game ended with the Squires blowing out the Nets with a 112-89 victory before ultimately being completely properly on January 24 (with a new head coach and some new players on their roster) as a part of a doubleheader series where the Nets would win the second match that was officially held on that night properly. Two days after the trade and Nets game that was initially protested on, the Squires recorded an ABA record-high 53 points in the fourth quarter in a 155-128 loss to the Nuggets in Denver. After months of waiting and healing, Mack Calvin finally made his playing debut with the Squires on January 15, scoring 24 points (but shooting at a 7/26 field goal rate and recording 13 of the team's 31 turnovers, showcasing he was still hurting a bit) in a 129-93 loss to the San Antonio Spurs; not only was attendance very poor that night (only 1,296 people attended that game, with sports writers claiming it was actually half the number that showed up instead), but telephones were also being removed along press row (similar to what happened to the Pittsburgh Condors one time during their final season of play in the ABA) and neither team's radio broadcast actually made it to the airwaves properly that night. A day after that, David Vaughn Jr. (who would appear in 10 games for the Squires this season averaging 2.9 points per game and averaging 36% field goal shooting there) would be convicted of two counts of assault, with two of the attempted murder counts being dropped and the other two being reduced down to assault counts, which led to him being sentenced to 60 days in jail and being fined $850. On January 17, 1976, the Squires traded Johnny Neumann and Jan van Breda Kolff to the Kentucky Colonels for Marv Roberts. Jack Ankerson became head coach on January 21, 1976, though his games would have him being assisted by Squires player Willie Wise acting as a co-coach there. After compiling a 1–1 record he was replaced by Zelmo Beaty on January 23, 1976. Beaty finished with a record of 9–33. Meanwhile, the owners of the Squires told the press that their latest plan to help raise enough money to help keep the team afloat for the season was to sell 100 banners that were worth $5,000 each that would hang from the ceilings of the arenas that the Squires played in.

By the time the 1976 ABA All-Star Game commenced on January 27 in Denver, despite the ABA having only 7 teams left, none of the Squires' players were deemed All-Star worthy this season.

==== February 1976 ====
A week after the Squires made their banner selling announcement, Willie Wise announced to the team in a restaurant at a hotel they were staying in Denver that unless the team sold 50 banners by tomorrow, the team would fold operations on February 3. When that day came, the owners said they didn't sell 50 banners just yet, but they were absolutely working on having it done; despite the notion that the team was working something out with the banners, the team would take a vote amongst themselves on whether they'd even play their upcoming game on February 4 against the Nuggets (their third game in a row against them) or not, especially since their payroll was two days late. Despite the rumors of the Squires folding being very loud before the game was played, the team decided to play their game against the Nuggets, which they ultimately lost 135-131 in overtime after leading by 30 seconds left in the overtime period. That night, the team's owners announced they sold 46 banners, being four shy of the 50 necessary to survive for the moment; the players then gave an ultimatum for the owners where they had to pay the players during their next game coming up against the Indiana Pacers in Indiana or they won't play at all, which was also fueled by the team being locked out of their hotel during the night and led to both the Nuggets and Pacers paying for the Squires' respective stays. Head coach Zelmo Beaty later said that he had never seen anything like that in the 12 years he had been involved with professional basketball and he supported the players with any decisions they made, though even he wasn't sure if they were going to play some nights up until four in the afternoon and that the financial situation was so bad that the athletic trainer, Bob "Chopper" Travaglini, didn't have enough money for tape and might have gotten supplies from other teams. Once the players arrived in Indiana on February 6, all of the players received certified checks that didn't bounce, meaning they were able to play that game as well, losing by only 5 points; Warner Fusselle later heard that day that the team received a $250,000 bank loan to help save the team for the rest of the regular season period. On February 8 & 9, the Squires lost 112-105 to both the Spurs and Spirits, with the opponent scoring the final 12 points of the game and the Squires failing to score in the last 3:07 against San Antonio and the last 5:07 against St. Louis. Before winning their February 19 game against the Kentucky Colonels, coach Zelmo Beaty suspended rookie Luther Burden due to immaturity issues he had. Beaty would later admit he thought every player on the team but Burden was good-hearted there and that they always played hard for him despite their record that season.

The Squires closed February 1976 on the 28th with a 99–92 victory over the Indiana Pacers in Norfolk before 4,967 fans, and on the 29th with an overtime loss in St. Louis to the Spirits, 113–109, with St. Louis' Marvin Barnes leading all scorers with 34 before 1,828 fans.

==== March 1976 ====
On a March 1 home loss against the Nuggets (which saw the return of Luther Burden during the season after missing eight games during that time), team owner Van Cunningham criticized the team's radio broadcaster, Warner Fusselle, about mentioning that fans of the 3,064 people in attendance were leaving early despite that being a true statement on his end. By March 21, the team had only seven players that were considered healthy enough to play games properly in the ABA, with Mack Calvin & Luther Burden both playing 58 minutes each and Mike Green playing 56 minutes, though their best efforts weren't enough to avoid a 13th straight loss in a row once again, this time against the Kentucky Colonels in double overtime. It was by this time that the season was clearly taking both a physical and emotional toll on its players, as Mel Bennett was seen crying on the way home after the rough double-overtime loss, though head coach Zelmo Beaty said that he would genuinely cry whenever the team lost a close, tough game similar to a good number of games that the Squires had experienced during this season. Virginia would get their revenge for that emotionally brutal loss three days later against the Colonels, ending their second 13-game losing streak of the season, though it would also become the only win the team would get during this month.

==== April 1976 ====
On April 2, 1976, despite Ticky Burden's game-high 28 points the Squires lost on the road to the Spirits of St. Louis, 110–109, before a crowd of only 1,388. The next night the Squires won at home against the Indiana Pacers, 113–112, before 4,336 fans. The next night, April 4, the Squires lost on the road against the New York Nets, 136–103, before 9,141 fans. On April 6 the Squires won at home against the Spirits, 120–116, before 2,448 fans in their last game in Hampton. The night after that, on April 7, 1976, the Squires lost their final game ever played, 127–123, at home in Norfolk against the New York Nets; former Squire Julius Erving had a game-high 38 points and 15 rebounds for the Nets, though the game was also considered notable for Mel Bennett causing yet another dunk that tilted the backboard for another 28 minute game delay into their season and the Squirette dancers walking out of the game at the half. Despite the brutal nature of this season, the team would still have a successful player gain recognition by the ABA during the season with Luther Burden being named a member of the final All-ABA Rookie Team ever announced after the regular season ended.

==== May 1976 ====
On May 11, 1976, the ABA canceled the Squires franchise. The Squires had missed a deadline to pay a $75,000 league assessment and reimburse the players for $120,000 in back pay. Primary owner Van Cunningham and team lawyer Hugh L. Patterson tried to make a counteroffer in order to try and survive long enough to at least make it to the ABA-NBA merger. The ABA turned the offer down and canceled the franchise. Since the 1976 ABA Playoffs were still underway, the final ABA season technically finished with only six teams instead of the initial seven that began the season. Furthermore, because the contractual obligations of both Luther Burden and Mel Bennett were not met during this time, both of the now former rookies would soon become immediate free agents for both leagues, even if it was just going to be the NBA playing later that season.

==== June 1976 ====
The ABA-NBA merger officially took place and was completed on June 17, 1976, though the already disbanded Squires were excluded from the merger talks and thus couldn't have any sort of demands met by the NBA by this time. The ABA originally wanted every team that was already around by this time to make it to the NBA, but the NBA wanted to exclude the Kentucky Colonels because the Chicago Bulls wanted to get Artis Gilmore and the Spirits of St. Louis (initially planned to become the Utah Rockies) because of poor reception as a franchise in St. Louis. Ultimately, the Spirits of St. Louis would get the Squires involved in the merger in spirit with their part of the settlement deal, where the Silna brothers would get 1/7 of the salary earned in perpetuity (1/7 being the representation of the initial surviving seven teams from the regular season before the Virginia Squires folded during the 1976 ABA Finals period and the initial likelihood of which team would miss out on the NBA at the time) from each of the four ABA teams that made it to the NBA. However, none of the Squires' players would be considered eligible for entry in the 1976 ABA dispersal draft held by the NBA. While Zelmo Beaty would be interviewed by the San Antonio Spurs for a potential head coaching spot, he would not get the spot due to Beaty having "a negative attitude about the ABA" and thus never having another coaching opportunity ever again. On a more positive note, Dave Twardzik of the Squires would later win the 1977 NBA Finals with the Portland Trail Blazers (the franchise that originally drafted him in the 1972 NBA draft) and later have his number retired by the franchise.

=== Records ===
The Squires ended the season with a record of 15 wins and 68 losses, putting them in last place in the ABA in terms of teams that actually would complete their regular season periods. They did not qualify for the playoffs.

== Transactions ==
=== Draft and preseason signings ===
- October 20, 1975: Chuck Williams of the Baltimore Claws is sold to the Virginia Squires

=== Trades and transactions ===
- December 1, 1975: Jim Eakins of the Utah Stars is sold to the Virginia Squires
- On January 7, 1976, Jim Eakins was traded to the New York Nets for Swen Nater and Bill Schaeffer
- On January 17, 1976, the Squires traded Johnny Neumann and Jan van Breda Kolff to the Kentucky Colonels for Marv Roberts
