= 1974–75 Virginia Squires season =

ABA basketball team season

- Head coach: Al Bianchi
- Arena: Norfolk Scope; Hampton Coliseum; Richmond Coliseum; Roanoke Civic Center

Results
- Record: 15–69 (.179)
- Place: Division: 5th (ABA)

Local media
- Television: WAVY 10
- Radio: WTAR

The 1974–75 Virginia Squires season was the fifth season of the Squires in the American Basketball Association (ABA) and their eighth overall season when including their seasons as the Oakland Oaks and Washington Caps. Being exhausted by the team's constant financial troubles, the ABA purchased the Virginia Squires from previous team owner Earl Foreman after former rookie Barry Parkhill's paycheck bounced on May 24, 1974 and he filed a lawsuit against Foreman, the Squires, and the ABA. The ABA later sold the Squires to a large ownership group that was primarily led by Van H. Cunningham, John B. Bernhardt, and Theodore Broecker in the hopes that they could make their financial troubles become a thing of the past on their ends. However, due to the franchise already having sold off All-Star and even Hall of Fame worthy talents such as Julius Erving and George Gervin in previous seasons in order to simply keep their team afloat, the Squires simply imploded with a lack of quality talent on display on their ends, losing 69 games and winning only 15 games, which would become the worst completed record in ABA history. Their longest winning streak during this time was only 3 games long, lasting from January 31 to February 3, 1975. At one point, from December 30, 1974 to January 26, 1975, they lost 15 straight games in a row to end the 1974 year and start out 1975 on a dour note. The only victory they had in the month of March 1975 was also their final victory of the season, as the team lost eight straight to close out the season. The team finished the season last in points per game at 99.0, with a middling 6th in points allowed with 109.5 per game. The 15–69 record would break the record held by the 1968–69 New York Nets season for the worst record ever produced in ABA history, as well as the record previously held by the 1973–74 Memphis Tams season for the most losses held by a team in one season.

== ABA Draft ==
Round	Pick	Player	Position(s)	Nationality	College
1	1	Tom McMillen	PF/C	United States	Maryland
1	5	Jan van Breda Kolff	SF	United States	Vanderbilt
2	12	Jesse Dark	SG	United States	Virginia Commonwealth
3	24	Lionel Billingy	PF	United States	Duquesne
4	32	Lerman Battle	F	United States	Fairmont State
5	42	Bernard Harris	C	United States	Virginia Commonwealth
6	52	Phil Lumpkin	PG	United States	Miami University (Ohio)
7	62	Earl Williams	C	United States; Israel	Winston-Salem State
8	72	John Drew	SF	United States	Gardner–Webb
9	82	Bill Campion	C	United States	Manhattan College
10	92	Mark Cartwright	C	United States	Bowling Green State

This draft table listing does not include selections made from the "ABA Draft of NBA Players" done immediately afterward, which the Squires also selected first over the Memphis Sounds (back when they were named the Memphis Tams) by winning a coin flip that year.

=== ABA Draft of NBA Players ===
Round	Pick	Player	Position(s)	Nationality	College	NBA Team
1	1	Bob Kauffman	PF/C	United States	Guilford	Buffalo Braves
2	12	George E. Johnson	C	United States	Stephen F. Austin State	Houston Rockets
3	21	Dick Snyder	SG/SF	United States	Davidson	Seattle SuperSonics
4	32	Calvin Murphy	PG	United States	Niagara	Houston Rockets
5	41	Barry Clemens	PF	United States	Ohio Wesleyan	Cleveland Cavaliers

The "ABA Draft of NBA Players" that was done on April 17, 1974 happened immediately after the actual ABA Draft done for this season was concluded on that day. None of the five players drafted by the Squires would report to the team this season, though George E. Johnson did previously play a season in the ABA with the Dallas Chaparrals (now known as the San Antonio Spurs). Calvin Murphy would later have his name be a part of the Naismith Basketball Hall of Fame.

== Roster ==
1974–75 Virginia Squires roster
Players

Pos.	No.	Player	Height	Weight	DOB	From
SG	33	Lloyd Batts	6 ft 4 in (1.93 m)	185 lb (84 kg)	May 9, 1951	Cincinnati
PF	52	Lionel Billingy	6 ft 9 in (2.06 m)	215 lb (98 kg)	August 31, 1952	Duquesne
SG	20	Glen Combs	6 ft 2 in (1.88 m)	185 lb (84 kg)	October 30, 1946	Virginia Tech
SG	11	Darrell Elston	6 ft 4 in (1.93 m)	190 lb (86 kg)	August 15, 1952	North Carolina
PF	15	Lamar Green	6 ft 7 in (2.01 m)	210 lb (95 kg)	March 22, 1947	Morehead State
SG	14	Bill Higgins	6 ft 2 in (1.88 m)	180 lb (82 kg)	December 15, 1952	Ashland
SF	30	George Irvine	6 ft 6 in (1.98 m)	200 lb (91 kg)	February 1, 1948	Washington
PF	31	Mike Jackson	6 ft 7 in (2.01 m)	215 lb (98 kg)	July 31, 1949	Cal State LA
SG	44	Johnny Neumann	6 ft 6 in (1.98 m)	200 lb (91 kg)	September 11, 1951	Mississippi
SG	40	Barry Parkhill	6 ft 4 in (1.93 m)	185 lb (84 kg)	May 10, 1951	Virginia
C	22	Aulcie Perry	6 ft 10 in (2.08 m)	210 lb (95 kg)	July 3, 1950	Bethune–Cookman
SF	5	Cincy Powell	6 ft 7 in (2.01 m)	220 lb (100 kg)	February 25, 1942	Portland
C	24	Red Robbins	6 ft 8 in (2.03 m)	190 lb (86 kg)	September 30, 1944	Tennessee
PG	13	Dave Twardzik	6 ft 1 in (1.85 m)	175 lb (79 kg)	September 20, 1950	Old Dominion
C	45	David Vaughn Jr.	6 ft 11 in (2.11 m)	220 lb (100 kg)	June 4, 1952	Oral Roberts
SF	42	Willie Wise	6 ft 5 in (1.96 m)	210 lb (95 kg)	March 3, 1947	Drake

Coaches
Head coach
- Al Bianchi

Legend
- (DP) Unsigned draft pick
- (FA) Free agent
- (S) Suspended
- Injured

Roster

== Final standings ==
=== Eastern Division ===
Team	W	L	PCT.	GB
Kentucky Colonels C	58	26	.690	-
New York Nets	58	26	.690	-
Spirits of St. Louis	32	52	.381	26
Memphis Sounds	27	57	.321	31
Virginia Squires	15	69	.179	43

== Awards and honors ==
1975 ABA All-Star Game selection (game played on January 28, 1975)

- Dave Twardzik
