= 1975 ABA draft =

Basketball player selection

General information
- Sport: Basketball
- Date: June 16, 1975
- Location: New York, New York

Overview
- 81 total selections in 8 rounds
- League: American Basketball Association
- Teams: 10
- Territorial picks: Marvin Webster, Denver Nuggets (Bonus Round Pick)
- First selection: David Thompson, Virginia Squires

The 1975 ABA draft was the ninth and final draft done by the American Basketball Association (ABA), a rivaling professional basketball league to the National Basketball Association (NBA) that they would later merge with as a part of the NBA following the conclusion of the 1975–76 ABA season.

This draft period would ultimately be the draft period where the lack of a proper national TV market to compete against the NBA (such as finding a viable alternative to the big three American TV networks, if not working with one of ABC, CBS, or NBC somehow) would finally catch up to the ABA due to a significant number of its teams facing financial struggles and burdens entering this draft period. It also marked the only true time where the ABA draft would truly start after the NBA draft did, which combined with an even lower amount of rounds and draft picks available from the ABA's end (including two bonus picks by the Denver Nuggets and Spirits of St. Louis that related to outside forces beyond their control involving players of their own accord, though only one of them would actually be used in the process) marked early signs that the ABA were about to meet its own end, one way or another.

That being said, the ABA would still find a scant few successes from this draft day before their final season concluded and the ABA ended up merging with the NBA with only four total teams still being active to this day (the Denver Nuggets, Indiana Pacers, New York Nets (now Brooklyn Nets), and San Antonio Spurs), with two other teams that survived up until the merger (the Kentucky Colonels and the Spirits of St. Louis (who planned to move to Utah to become the Utah Rockies at first before merger talks began and the team's owners even contemplated moving the squad out to Hartford, Connecticut at one point), with a third team in the Virginia Squires actually completing the regular season, but not surviving operations before the completion of the 1976 ABA Playoffs) ultimately not making it to the NBA in the end. This draft also marked the only draft that the Denver Nuggets would participate in while still in the ABA under that name, as well as the only draft that both the Memphis Sounds and Spirits of St. Louis would be involved in altogether under those names before things started to fall apart for the ABA in their final season of play.

== Draftee career notes ==
Due to this year's draft being the final draft in ABA history before the ABA-NBA merger happened, it can be said that there's not too many notable draftees at hand this time around by comparison. However, there are still some notable aspects about this year's draft from the ABA that still stand out as a whole, such as excluding the Bonus pick of Marvin Webster by the Denver Nuggets (who underperformed in his rookie season and missed out on the 1976 ABA All-Star Game due to liver problems that apparently related to hepatitis, but still had a couple of solid seasons in the NBA afterward), the technical #1 pick of the ABA draft was former technical #102 1973 undergraduate draft pick David Thompson by the Virginia Squires, who chose to play for the Nuggets (who did not have his undergraduate draft pick rights at the time, but chose to play for Denver over the Squires or Memphis Sounds (who did have his undergraduate draft rights by this point in time), with the Squires later conducting a trade involving Thompson going to Denver a month after this draft ended) alongside Webster over the Atlanta Hawks (who had drafted him as the #1 pick earlier in the 1975 NBA draft, but were considered below par when compared to the Nuggets in the ABA at the time), with Thompson not only being the only draft pick from this year to be a part of the ABA All-Time Team through being the final ABA All-Star Game's MVP via the 1976 ABA All-Star Game as a member of the Denver Nuggets (but would have made it in regardless of team designation), but also won the final ABA Rookie of the Year Award (while also being a member of the final ABA All-Rookie Team) and being a member of the All-ABA Second Team in his only ABA season before later being a two time All-NBA First Team member and four time NBA All-Star (including the 1979 NBA All-Star Game's MVP) in order to not only have his #33 retired by the Nuggets, but also be inducted into the Naismith Basketball Hall of Fame.

In addition to Thompson, he was joined by #8 pick Mark Olberding and #32 pick (also former #54 pick of the 1974 ABA draft) Luther Burden, as well as #36 pick of the 1974 ABA draft Kim Hughes and #29 pick of the 1973 ABA Senior Draft M. L. Carr as the last members of the All-ABA Rookie Team that was ever created. In addition to Thompson, #30 pick Monte Towe was the only other player drafted in this year's draft to be named an ABA All-Star (though his privilege was more due to him being a part of the Denver Nuggets that season over anything else), meaning this year's draft only produced two total ABA All-Stars for the 1976 ABA All-Star Game out of 92 overall ABA All-Stars (with 35 ABA All-Stars having been eligible for play coming from the 1966 NBA draft, if not earlier than that, including some players that had previously been banned from the NBA due to alleged involvement in the 1961 NCAA University Division men's basketball gambling scandal). In addition to David Thompson, the only other player selected in this draft to have also made it to the Naismith Basketball Hall of Fame was #48 pick Robert Parish, who would make it there due to his part with what was considered a "Big Three" and then a "Big Four" era for the Boston Celtics during the 1980s, as well as another championship while with the Chicago Bulls under Michael Jordan's own "Big Three" of sorts during Parish's final year of play in 1997, which would make him the oldest ABA associated player by that point in time.

Finally, the player that can be considered the last pick of the entire ABA's history was Lou Silver from Harvard University by the defending champion Kentucky Colonels; while he would never play for either the ABA or the NBA, he would have significant success with the Maccabi Tel Aviv out in Israel (to the point of later becoming a dual citizen for Israel alongside the U.S.A.) by winning Israeli League championships in every single season of play for them there alongside eight Israeli Cup championships, two EuroLeague championships, and a FIBA Intercontinental Cup championship alongside a FIBA European Selection in 1981 and a silver medal for EuroBasket in 1979.

== Historic draft notes ==
This draft saw the ABA cut down the number of rounds from ten in the previous year's draft to only eight in this year's draft, excluding the bonus round draft selections given out to both the Denver Nuggets and the Spirits of St. Louis for different reasons relating to players at hand. The Nuggets were given a bonus selection alongside the picks they already got due to the Spirits of St. Louis signing Marvin Barnes away from them on July 14, 1974 back when they were still going by the Denver Rockets, while the Spirits were granted a bonus draft pick due to Billy Cunningham leaving the franchise back when they were still going under the Carolina Cougars name for the Philadelphia 76ers in the rivaling NBA due to legal court jargon, though the Spirits ultimately skipped out on using their pick by comparison to the Nuggets (likely for financial reasons).

This draft period's aftermath would be the breaking point of the ABA, with the league truly starting to feel the struggles of regularly competing against the NBA without having a proper national TV contract to help generate more money for it. Following the conclusion of this draft day, the Memphis Sounds would move up to Baltimore, Maryland to initially play as the Baltimore Hustlers before controversy with that team name forced them to rename the team into the Baltimore Claws instead, while the San Diego Conquistadors would rebrand themselves as the San Diego Sails entering what would become the ABA's final season. Not only that, but it was reported that both the Denver Nuggets and New York Nets were trying to sneak themselves into the NBA directly ahead of the eventual NBA–ABA merger as teams that would join in early (with those two teams also wanting the defending ABA champion Kentucky Colonels to join them before the team owner's loyalty to the ABA stopped that team from joining into that merger plan) before court orders forced them both to stay put for one last, final ABA season that, funnily enough, ultimately led to the Nets winning the final ABA championship over the Nuggets.

However, the real endgame for the ABA would come during its final season of play, with the league seeing the likes of the Baltimore Claws, San Diego Sails, Utah Stars, and Virginia Squires all fold at various points throughout the season (with the Claws folding during the preseason period, the Squires folding either near the end of or after the season (depending on how one would see things with them) before they had a chance to join the other surviving ABA teams in the upcoming NBA-ABA merger, and it getting to the point where the NBA conducted a draft with a select few undergraduate players from the ABA near the end of 1975 and the 1976 ABA All-Star Game essentially being the Denver Nuggets against the rest of the ABA's All-Stars after scrapping the East Division Vs. West Division format they had throughout their entire existence beforehand following the Stars' departure, with the Nuggets winning that game in question), thus leaving the ABA with only six teams left (the Denver Nuggets, Indiana Pacers, Kentucky Colonels, New York Nets, San Antonio Spurs, and Spirits of St. Louis, the last of whom had originally planned to move to Utah themselves to become the Utah Rockies had the team or the ABA somehow managed to continue onward, though they were also willing to move to Hartford, Connecticut for the NBA's sake) by the end of their final season and entering the ABA-NBA merger without anything else to do on their ends besides negotiating with the NBA itself by 1976, not even being allowed to participate in the 1976 NBA draft (though the surviving teams could participate in the upcoming ABA dispersal draft not long afterward, which everyone that made it did outside of the Nuggets, with Denver later proving to not need either draft during that first season in the NBA).

== Key ==
Pos.	G	F	C
Position	Guard	Forward	Center

Accomplishments key
Symbol	Meaning	Symbol	Meaning
^	Denotes player who has been inducted to the Naismith Memorial Basketball Hall of Fame	‡	Denotes player that was selected to the ABA All-Time Team
*	Denotes player who has been selected for at least one All-Star Game and All-ABA Team	+	Denotes player who has been selected for at least one All-Star Game
~	Denotes a player that won the ABA Rookie of the Year Award	#	Denotes player who has never appeared in either an ABA or NBA regular season or playoff game

== Draft ==
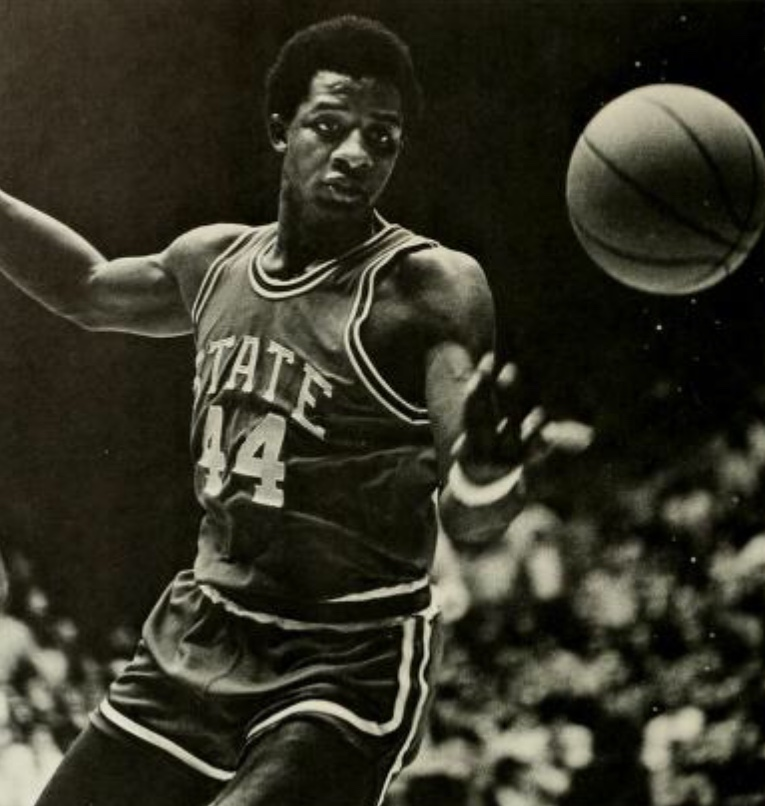
David Thompson was the second overall pick (first pick in the first round excluding the previous bonus round pick) in the 1975 ABA Draft (the final, proper ABA draft in league history) by the Virginia Squires; he would later be traded to the Denver Nuggets months before the final ABA season officially began.

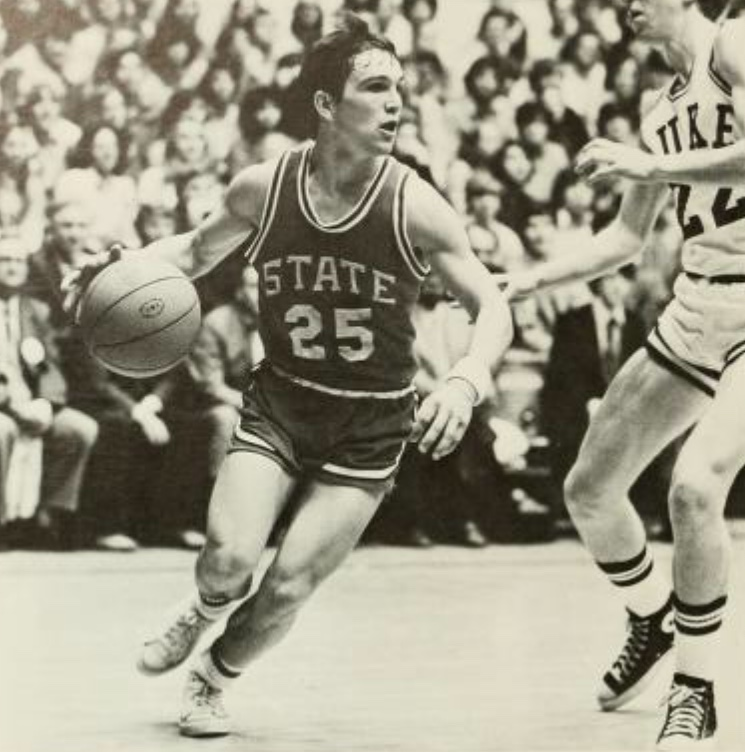
Monte Towe (left) was the 30th pick (29th pick excluding the previous bonus round selection) of the 1975 ABA Draft by the Denver Nuggets.

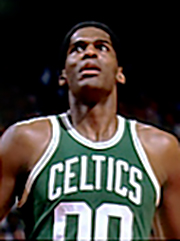
Robert Parish was the 48th pick (47th pick excluding the previous bonus round selection) of the 1975 ABA Draft by the San Antonio Spurs.

Round	Pick	Player	Pos.	Nationality	Team	School
Bonus	1	Marvin Webster	C	United States	Denver Nuggets	Morgan State (Sr.)
Bonus	Spirits of St. Louis (declined to use their bonus pick entirely for this draft)					
1	2	David Thompson~^‡	SG	United States	Virginia Squires	NC State (Sr.)
1	3	Lonnie Shelton	PF/C	United States	Memphis Sounds	Oregon State (So.)
1	4	Kevin Grevey	SG/SF	United States	San Diego Conquistadors	Kentucky (Sr.)
1	5	Gus Williams	PG	United States	Spirits of St. Louis	USC (Sr.)
1	6	Steve Green	SF	United States	Utah Stars	Indiana (Sr.)
1	7	Dan Roundfield	PF	United States	Indiana Pacers	Central Michigan (Sr.)
1	8	Mark Olberding	PF/SF	United States	San Antonio Spurs	Minnesota (Sr.)
1	9	John Lucas II	PG	United States	New York Nets	Maryland (Jr.)
1	10	Mel Bennett	PF	United States	Virginia Squires (from Denver)	Pittsburgh (Fr.)
1	11	Jimmie Baker	PF	United States	Kentucky Colonels	Hawaii (Sr.)
2	12	Jimmy Dan Conner	SG	United States	Virginia Squires	Kentucky (Sr.)
2	13	Rich Kelley	C/PF	United States	Memphis Sounds	Stanford (Sr.)
2	14	Cornelius Cash	PF	United States	San Diego Conquistadors	Bowling Green (Sr.)
2	15	Rudy White	SG	United States	Spirits of St. Louis	Arizona State (Sr.)
2	16	Norm Cook	SF	United States	Utah Stars	Kansas (Sr.)
2	17	Charles Jordan	SF	United States	Indiana Pacers	Canisius (Jr.)
2	18	Jim Lee^{#}	PG	United States	Indiana Pacers (from San Antonio)	Syracuse (Sr.)
2	19	George Bucci	SG	United States	New York Nets	Manhattan (Sr.)
2	20	Bill Willoughby	PF/C	United States	Denver Nuggets	Dwight Morrow HS (New Jersey) (HS Sr.)
2	21	Rick Suttle^{#}	C	United States	San Antonio Spurs (from Kentucky)	Kansas (Sr.)
3	22	Allen Murphy	SG	United States	Kentucky Colonels (from Virginia)	Louisville (Sr.)
3	23	Ron Haigler^{#}	PF	United States	Memphis Sounds	Pennsylvania (Sr.)
3	24	Bob Gross	SF	United States	San Diego Conquistadors	Long Beach State (Sr.)
3	25	Rudy Hackett	PF	United States	Spirits of St. Louis	Syracuse (Sr.)
3	26	Tom Kropp	PG	United States	Denver Nuggets (from Utah)	Kearney State (Sr.)
3	27	Ken Tyler^{#}	PG	United States	Indiana Pacers	Gonzaga (Sr.)
3	28	Bill Taylor^{#}	SF	United States	San Antonio Spurs	La Salle (Sr.)
3	29	Leon Douglas	C	United States	New York Nets	Alabama (Jr.)
3	30	Monte Towe^{+}	PG	United States	Denver Nuggets	NC State (Sr.)
3	31	Eric Fernsten	C/PF	United States	Kentucky Colonels	San Francisco (Sr.)
4	32	Luther Burden	SG	United States	Virginia Squires	Utah (Sr.)
4	33	Glenn Hansen	SG	United States	Memphis Sounds	LSU (Sr.)
4	34	Pete Trgovich^{#}	G	United States	San Diego Conquistadors	UCLA (Sr.)
4	35	Tom Roy^{#}	C	United States	Spirits of St. Louis	Maryland (Sr.)
4	36	Fessor Leonard^{#}	C	United States	Virginia Squires (from Utah)	Furman (Sr.)
4	37	Brian Hammel^{#}	G	United States	Indiana Pacers	Bentley College (Sr.)
4	38	Ken Smith	SG	United States	San Antonio Spurs	Tulsa (Sr.)
4	39	Bob Guyette^{#}	PF	United States	New York Nets	Kentucky (Sr.)
4	40	Bob Fleischer^{#}	F	United States	Denver Nuggets	Duke (Sr.)
4	41	John Laskowski	SG	United States	Kentucky Colonels	Indiana (Sr.)
5	42	Richard Jones^{#}	SG/SF	United States	Virginia Squires	Virginia Commonwealth (Sr.)
5	43	Walter Luckett^{#}	SG	United States	Memphis Sounds	Ohio (Sr.)
5	44	Clark "Biff" Burrell^{#}	PG/SG	United States	San Diego Conquistadors	USC (Sr.)
5	45	Larry Fogle	G	United States	Spirits of St. Louis	Canisius (Sr.)
5	46	C. J. Kupec	C/PF	United States	Spirits of St. Louis (from Utah via Denver)	Michigan (Sr.)
5	47	John Ramsay^{#}	F	United States	Indiana Pacers	Seton Hall (Sr.)
5	48	Robert Parish^	C	United States	San Antonio Spurs	Centenary (Jr.)
5	49	Darryl Brown^{#}	C/PF	United States	New York Nets	Fordham (Sr.)
5	50	Jimmy Moore^{#}	PF	United States	Denver Nuggets	Utah State (Sr.)
5	51	Charles Cleveland^{#}	SG	United States	Kentucky Colonels	Alabama (Sr.)
6	52	Fletcher Johnson Jr.^{#}	SF	United States	Virginia Squires	Randolph–Macon (Sr.)
6	53	Terry Furlow	SG/SF	United States	Memphis Sounds	Michigan State (Jr.)
6	54	Louis Dunbar^{#}	SF	United States	San Diego Conquistadors	Houston (Sr.)
6	55	Allen Jones^{#}	SF	United States	Spirits of St. Louis	San Diego (Sr.)
6	56	Otis Johnson^{#}	C	United States	Utah Stars	John B. Stetson University (Sr.)
6	57	Mike Flynn	SG/PG	United States; Morocco	Indiana Pacers	Kentucky (Sr.)
6	58	Bayard Forrest	C	United States	San Antonio Spurs	Grand Canyon (Jr.)
6	59	Mike Mitchell	SF	United States	New York Nets	Auburn (Fr.)
6	60	Charles Russell^{#}	SF	United States	Denver Nuggets	Alabama (Sr.)
6	61	Mike Rozenski^{#}	F	United States	Kentucky Colonels	Saint Mary's College (CA) (Sr.)
7	62	Bill Bunton^{#}	C/PF	United States	Virginia Squires	Louisville (Sr.)
7	63	Rick Whitlow^{#}	PG	United States	Memphis Sounds	Illinois State (Sr.)
7	64	Jerome Anderson	SG	United States	San Diego Conquistadors	West Virginia (Sr.)
7	65	Allen Spruill^{#}	SG	United States	Spirits of St. Louis	North Carolina A&T State (Sr.)
7	66	Tim van Blommesteyn^{#}	G	United States	Utah Stars	Princeton (Sr.)
7	67	Cliff Pratt^{#}	G	United States	Indiana Pacers	Shaw University (Sr.)
7	68	Henry Ward	SG	United States	San Antonio Spurs	Jackson State (Sr.)
7	69	Wayne Croft^{#}	PF	United States	New York Nets	Clemson (Sr.)
7	70	Mike Odemns^{#}	C/PF	United States	Denver Nuggets	Western Kentucky (Sr.)
7	71	Randy Meister^{#}	C	United States	Kentucky Colonels	Penn State (Sr.)
8	72	Ricky Coleman^{#}	SG	United States	Virginia Squires	Jacksonville (Sr.)
8	73	John Murphy^{#}	F	United States	Memphis Sounds	Massachusetts (Sr.)
8	74	Mack Coleman^{#}	PF	United States	San Diego Conquistadors	Houston Baptist (Sr.)
8	75	Ted Hathaway^{#}	G	United States	Spirits of St. Louis	Cleveland State (Sr.)
8	76	Kirk Bruce^{#}	SG	United States	Utah Stars	Pittsburgh (Sr.)
8	77	Bill Andreas^{#}	SF	United States	Indiana Pacers	Ohio State (Sr.)
8	78	Gary Tomaszewski^{#}	SF	United States	San Antonio Spurs	St. Mary's University (TX) (Sr.)
8	79	John Lambert	C/PF	United States	New York Nets	USC (Sr.)
8	80	Owen Brown^{#}	F	United States	Denver Nuggets	Maryland (Sr.)
8	81	Lou Silver^{#}	SF/PF	United States	Kentucky Colonels	Harvard (Sr.)

=== Notable undrafted players ===
These players were officially considered draft eligible for the 1975 ABA draft and went undrafted this year, yet played at least one regular season or playoff game for the ABA before the ABA-NBA merger commenced a year later.

Player	Pos.	Nationality	School
Nate Barnett	PG	United States; Nigeria	Akron (Sr.)
Rick Darnell	C	United States	San Jose State (Sr.)
Skip Wise	PG	United States	Clemson (Fr.)

=== 1975 ABA dispersal drafts ===
On October 20, 1975, four days after being given an ultimatum by the ABA regarding survival and less than a week (five days) before starting what ultimately became the ABA's final regular season, the Baltimore Claws were forcibly closed by the ABA itself due to the team not having enough money for their ultimatum after poor preseason performances against the Virginia Squires and the NBA's Philadelphia 76ers. The ABA would create an impromptu dispersal draft involving the Claws' players that remained on the roster the following day afterward, with the now nine remaining ABA teams looking over and potentially choosing who to take for their own rosters. Not every team would choose a player from the Claws, however, as three of the ABA's teams declined entry in this dispersal draft altogether in the Kentucky Colonels, New York Nets, and San Antonio Spurs. In fact, one Claws player in George Carter would join his new ABA team in the Utah Stars only after the ABA dispersal draft involving the Claws ended, while another player named Skip Wise was skipped out on altogether due to questions involving his no-trade clause by other teams and a third player in ABA All-Time Team star player Mel Daniels was passed up on entirely due to his exorbitant contract he had with the now-defunct franchise being something that had to be picked up by other ABA teams, which led to him skipping out on the ABA entirely that season for playing in Italy instead. Not only that, this dispersal draft would also technically mark the only draft that the San Diego Sails would draft anybody at all under the short time they did anything under that new name of theirs. Still, the following Claws players would end up being selected in the first dispersal draft of the year.

Denver Nuggets

- Claude Terry

Indiana Pacers

- Scott English

Spirits of St. Louis

- Dave Robisch
- Paul Ruffner

San Diego Sails

- Stew Johnson

Utah Stars

- Joe Hamilton

Virginia Squires

- Chuck Williams

Over two weeks later, following the Claws' end as a franchise sometime after their relocation from Memphis to Baltimore, the recently rebranded San Diego Sails would also meet their unexpected end on November 11, 1975 after playing 11 games in the regular season (officially ending themselves with a 3–8 record). For the San Diego franchise, their demise would come not just from a poor start to the season following their rebranding from the Conquistadors to the Sails, but also hearing that the franchise would be shut out of the upcoming NBA–ABA merger early on due to the insistence of then-Los Angeles Lakers owner Jack Kent Cooke not wanting any competition for a share of his team's fan base with another team in the southern California region. (Ironically, the Lakers would end up seeing competition in the NBA there anyway with the Buffalo Braves moving to San Diego themselves a few years after the Sails folded to become the San Diego Clippers before later becoming the Los Angeles Clippers.) Unlike the previous dispersal draft during this year, only two of the now eight remaining ABA teams would officially utilize the dispersal draft for the Sails' players this time around: the Indiana Pacers and the San Antonio Spurs, though a couple of the Sails' players would go to some other ABA teams after this particular dispersal draft concluded. Not only that, but Caldwell Jones would also be held out of the dispersal draft himself due to him having signed a future contract with the Philadelphia 76ers of the rivaling NBA, with whom he had been drafted with a few years prior. However, a decent amount of the Sails' players would be picked up by a few of the now eight remaining ABA teams after the second dispersal draft of the ABA's young season concluded, with Stew Johnson going to the San Antonio Spurs, Kevin Joyce and Caldwell Jones going to the Kentucky Colonels, and even head coach Bill Musselman later coaching the Virginia Squires some time after the dispersal draft concluded. Still, the following Sails players would be selected during the second dispersal draft of the year for the ABA.

Indiana Pacers

- Bo Lamar
- Dave Robisch

San Antonio Spurs

- Mark Olberding

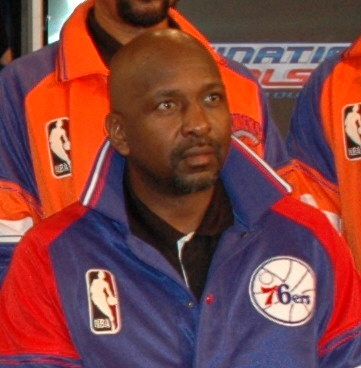
In lieu of holding a third ABA dispersal draft in 1975, Moses Malone was one of four players sent out from the defunct Utah Stars to the Spirits of St. Louis franchise in December 1975 in the hopes of helping that franchise survive until the end of what ultimately became the final season of the ABA's original existence.

The third and final team to fold operations during the 1975 year was the Utah Stars, who had completed 16 games for an official 4–12 record before folding operations and essentially ending divisions altogether for the rest of the ABA's existence on December 2, 1975 due to the team's owner going broke by this time following a failed bid for the Governor of Colorado. Initially, the owners of the Spirits of St. Louis franchise actually wanted to do a merger with the Utah Stars to help save both of their franchises at the same time (though likely at the price of ending one of these teams in the process, similar to the Minnesota North Stars and Cleveland Barons merger in the NHL only saving the Minnesota North Stars (now Dallas Stars) franchise as opposed to the temporary mergers of the Steagles and Card-Pitt that the Pittsburgh Steelers did in the NFL back in World War II saving every franchise involved in the end), but ultimately reneged on the merger literally the day before the Stars folded operations entirely. Unlike the other two teams that folded during the 1975 year, however, the ABA did not really hold a dispersal draft for the now-former Stars players involving the now seven remaining ABA teams left over. Instead, remembering that the Spirits of St. Louis franchise had discussed the idea of merging with the Utah Stars prior to the team folding operations, the ABA allowed the Spirits to acquire four of their best players in future Hall of Famer Moses Malone, future ABA All-Time Team member Ron Boone, Randy Denton, and Steve Green instead in hopes of helping their franchise out for the rest of the season, as well as giving former Stars team owner Bill Daniels a 10% minority stake interest in the Spirits of St. Louis franchise. Incidentally, another franchise that looked for help to survive during the season, the Virginia Squires, also bought one of the former Stars players that was available during that time in Jim Eakins in the hopes of somehow surviving the rest of the season themselves, which they did to the extent of completing the regular season, but not making it to the NBA–ABA merger meetings properly due to failing to make it with enough of a payment plan to at least survive until the team entered the merger period altogether. As a result, none of the Squires' players from that final season would be utilized in a dispersal draft either by the ABA or the NBA in 1976, though most of the Squires' players that season would end up playing in the NBA following this period of time anyway.
