= 1976 ABA dispersal draft =

Allocated players from two dissolved teams

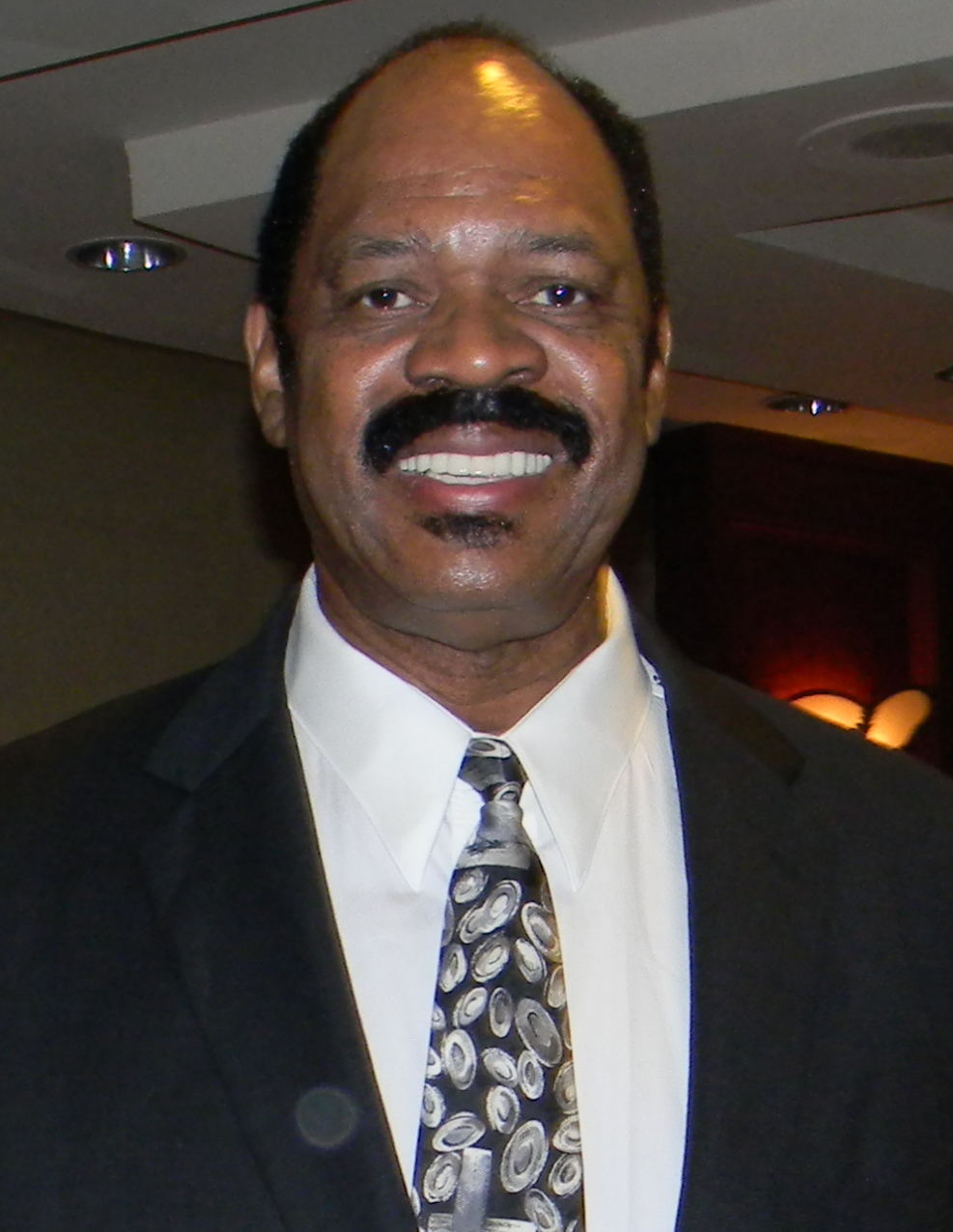
Artis Gilmore was selected first by the Chicago Bulls from the Kentucky Colonels.

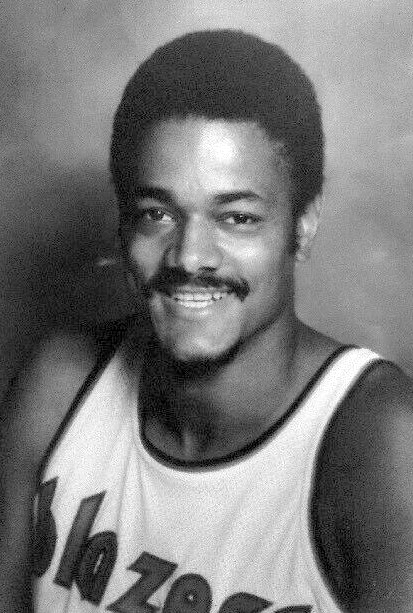
Maurice Lucas was selected second by the Portland Trail Blazers via trading with the Atlanta Hawks from the Kentucky Colonels.

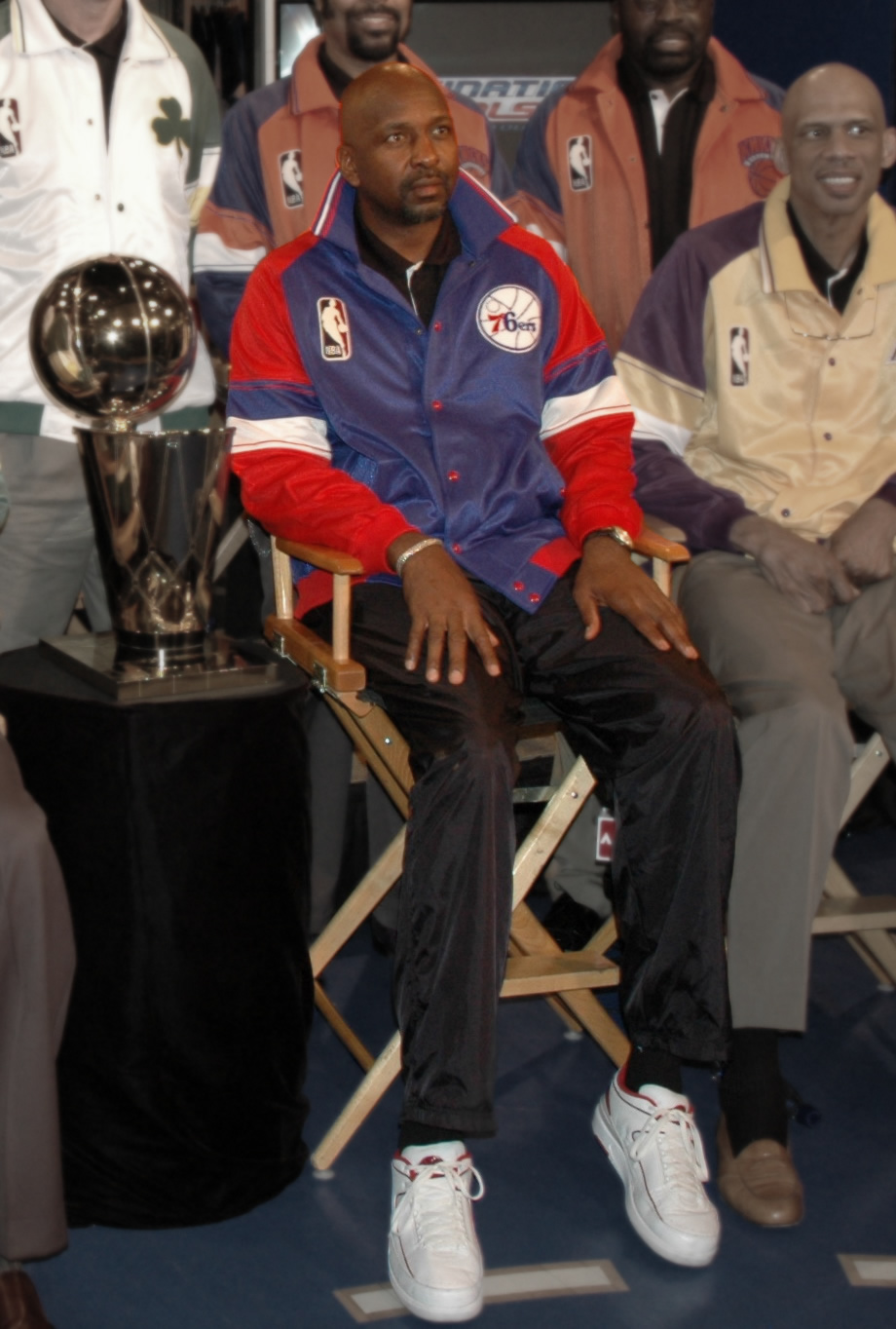
Moses Malone was selected fifth by the Portland Trail Blazers from the Spirits of St. Louis.

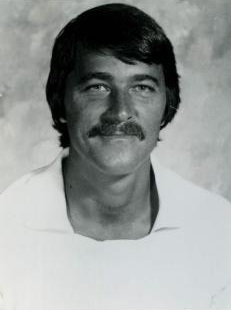
Louie Dampier was selected tenth by the San Antonio Spurs from the Kentucky Colonels, effectively going from one ABA team to another in his transfer from the ABA to the NBA.

On August 5, 1976, as a result of the ABA–NBA merger that occurred back in June of that year, the NBA hosted a dispersal draft to select players from the Kentucky Colonels and Spirits of St. Louis, the two American Basketball Association (ABA) franchises that had survived the final ABA season up until the conclusion of the 1976 ABA Playoffs, but were not included in the ABA–NBA merger properly. (A third team, the Virginia Squires, did survive the regular season period of the 1975–76 ABA season (albeit with 83 games played instead of the full 84 games played from every other ABA team that survived the regular season period), but they would not survive past the 1976 ABA Playoffs due to them failing to make what could have very well been a final $75,000 assessment for the ABA alongside an extra $125,000 in back pay for their players that was missed out for them at various points in their final season of play, meaning their players were not eligible for being selected in the dispersal draft.)

The eighteen NBA teams and the four ABA teams that joined the NBA, the Denver Nuggets, Indiana Pacers, New York Nets and San Antonio Spurs, were allowed to participate in the draft. The teams selected in reverse order of their win–loss percentage in the previous NBA and ABA seasons. In the case of the teams that were in the ABA that survived into the NBA, all of them were already considered some of the best teams there in terms of playing record, though the Indiana Pacers were the only team to be an early selection as the apparent 8th pick of the first round of that draft due to their 39–45 record in the ABA being something that would have likely let them miss the playoffs entirely in the NBA that season (with the only possible way they would have been in the 1976 NBA Playoffs was if they had appeared in the Midwest Division), while the San Antonio Spurs, New York Nets, and Denver Nuggets would have picked at the equivalent of 17th, 19th, and 21st picks of that draft (with San Antonio being behind the Cleveland Cavaliers, the ABA champion Nets being behind the NBA champion Boston Celtics, and Denver being behind only the Golden State Warriors in terms of selections that year) had every team used their first-round selections there. The team that made a selection paid for the signing rights to the player, which were set by the league's committee. The dispersal draft would have also lasted for upwards to three rounds had teams opted to use them all, but only one team in the Kansas City Kings even bothered using up their second-round pick at all in this draft, with no teams even using the third round at all. Two dispersal round trades also occurred around this time as well, with one of them resulting in one of the teams being an immediate championship winner following the 1977 NBA Finals. The money from the draft was used to help the four ABA teams that merged with the NBA to pay off some of their obligations to the two folded ABA franchises, the Colonels and Spirits, with the third and final ABA team that had survived the ABA's final regular season, the Virginia Squires, missing out on the dispersal draft and negotiations in the ABA-NBA merger altogether. The team that made a selection was obligated to assume the player's ABA contract. The players who were not selected would become free agents.

Twenty players from both the Colonels and the Spirits were available for the draft. Eleven were selected in the first round, while the twelfth player was selected in the second round. Eight players were not selected from this draft and thus became free agents not long afterward. The Chicago Bulls used the first pick to select the Colonels' five-time ABA All-Star Artis Gilmore with a signing price of $1,100,000. The Portland Trail Blazers, who acquired the Atlanta Hawks' second pick, selected Maurice Lucas from the Colonels and Moses Malone from the Spirits with signing price of $300,000 and $350,000 respectively. Both of these players would become the only players selected in this draft to end up winning an NBA Finals championship during their careers, though they would not do so as teammates, with Lucas winning his immediately after being drafted by Portland in the 1977 NBA Finals and Malone winning his with former New York Nets star Julius Erving and Denver Nuggets rising star Bobby Jones while with the Philadelphia 76ers after joining the team in 1982 in time for the 1983 NBA Finals. Marvin Barnes from the Spirits of St. Louis, who was selected fourth by the Detroit Pistons, was the second most expensive player in the draft with a signing price of $500,000. Ron Thomas from the Colonels, who was selected ninth by the Houston Rockets, but he ultimately became the only ABA player drafted to not play a single game in the NBA at all. Several teams elected to pass up on using their first-round picks, with only the Kansas City Kings using the second-round pick as an option altogether. The draft continued up until the third round, but no other players were selected by then, making the existence of that third round become a complete waste of time and effort.

By the end of the dispersal draft, seven players from the Colonels and five players from the Spirits would be selected in this draft, while four players from the Colonels and four players from the Spirits were free to enter the NBA free agency market to sign up with other teams to potentially play in the NBA alongside all of the Virginia Squires' players that missed out on being a part of the dispersal draft. In terms of undrafted Colonels and Spirits players available, the Colonels' Allen Murphy and Johnny Neumann alongside the Spirits' Mike D'Antoni, Steve Green, and Freddie Lewis would all see play in the NBA after the dispersal draft ended, while the likes of the Spirits' Barry Parkhill and the Colonels' Jimmie Baker and Jimmy Dan Conner would never play professionally again. Meanwhile, numerous former Squires players like Mel Bennett, Mack Calvin, Fatty Taylor, Luther Burden, Mike Green, Dave Twardzik, Willie Wise, Jim Eakins (who had previously played for the Squires during their final season of play, but was last playing for the ABA champion Nets before leaving that team sometime either during or after the ABA-NBA merger commenced), and Swen Nater would all end up playing in the NBA themselves through other teams. Notably, many of the undrafted players from the dispersal draft alongside players from the Squires would see themselves in the NBA due to one of the four surviving ABA teams giving them a shot at the NBA themselves. However, Dave Twardzik would be the only former ABA player from one of the three defunct ABA teams that was not selected in the ABA dispersal draft to later win an NBA Finals championship, with him being a part of the 1976–77 Portland Trail Blazers championship roster alongside Lucas.

== Record reference of NBA & ABA teams in 1975–76 ==
This table showcases the overall records of every NBA team and every ABA team that officially completed their respective 1975–76 seasons. The teams that are not included here are the San Diego Sails (who finished with a 3–8 record before folding on November 12, 1975, and inadvertently caused the Virginia Squires to play one less game than every other ABA team here (as well as one more game than every other NBA team) due to the odd number of games played) and the Utah Stars (who finished with a 4–12 record before folding on December 2, 1975), who both folded operations in late 1975 alongside the Baltimore Claws, a planned replacement for the Memphis Sounds who did play three preseason games against the Virginia Squires of the ABA and the Philadelphia 76ers of the NBA before folding operations five days before the start of what would become the ABA's final season of play.

Team	W	L	PCT.
Golden State Warriors	59	23	.720
Denver Nuggets	60	24	.714
**Boston Celtics**	54	28	.659
**New York Nets**	55	29	.655
Cleveland Cavaliers	49	33	.598
San Antonio Spurs	50	34	.595
Washington Bullets	48	34	.585
Philadelphia 76ers	46	36	.561
Buffalo Braves	46	36	.561
Kentucky Colonels †	46	38	.548
Seattle SuperSonics	43	39	.524
Phoenix Suns	42	40	.512
Houston Rockets	40	42	.488
Los Angeles Lakers	40	42	.488
Indiana Pacers	39	45	.464
New York Knicks	38	44	.463
New Orleans Jazz	38	44	.463
Milwaukee Bucks	38	44	.463
Portland Trail Blazers	37	45	.451
Detroit Pistons	36	46	.439
Spirits of St. Louis †	35	49	.417
Kansas City Kings	31	51	.378
Atlanta Hawks	29	53	.354
Chicago Bulls	24	58	.293
Virginia Squires ‡	15	68	.181

† did not make it to the NBA via the ABA–NBA merger.
‡ survived the regular season, but did not make it to the ABA–NBA merger at all whatsoever.
Italics – runner-ups of their respective leagues.
Bold – champions of their respective leagues.

== Dispersal draft ==
Accomplishments key
Symbol	Meaning	Symbol	Meaning
^	Denotes player who has been inducted to the Naismith Memorial Basketball Hall of Fame	*	Denotes player who has been selected for at least one All-Star Game and All-NBA Team
‡	Denotes player that was selected to the ABA All-Time Team	#	Denotes player who has never appeared in an NBA regular season or playoff game

Round	Pick	Player	Pos.	Nationality	Team	ABA team	Signing price	Ref.
1	1	Artis Gilmore^{^}‡	C	United States	Chicago Bulls	Kentucky Colonels	$1,100,000	
1	2	Maurice Lucas*‡	F/C	United States	Portland Trail Blazers (from Atlanta)	Kentucky Colonels	$300,000	
1	3	Ron Boone‡	G/F	United States	Kansas City Kings	Spirits of St. Louis	$250,000	
1	4	Marvin Barnes‡	F/C	United States	Detroit Pistons	Spirits of St. Louis	$500,000	
1	5	Moses Malone^‡	F/C	United States	Portland Trail Blazers	Spirits of St. Louis	$350,000	
1	6	Randy Denton	C	United States	New York Knicks	Spirits of St. Louis	$50,000	
1	New Orleans Jazz (Passed up on using this selection.)							
1	7	Bird Averitt	G	United States	Buffalo Braves (from Milwaukee)	Kentucky Colonels	$125,000	
1	8	Wil Jones	F	United States	Indiana Pacers	Kentucky Colonels	$50,000	
1	Los Angeles Lakers (Passed up on using this selection.)							
1	9	Ron Thomas^{#}	G/F	United States	Houston Rockets	Kentucky Colonels	$15,000	
1	Phoenix Suns (Passed up on using this selection.)							
1	Seattle SuperSonics (Passed up on using this selection.)							
1	Philadelphia 76ers (Passed up on using this selection.)							
1	Milwaukee Bucks (from Buffalo) (Passed up on using this selection.)							
1	Washington Bullets (Passed up on using this selection.)							
1	10	Louie Dampier^{^}‡	G	United States	San Antonio Spurs	Kentucky Colonels	$20,000	
1	Cleveland Cavaliers (Passed up on using this selection.)							
1	11	Jan van Breda Kolff	G/F	United States	New York Nets	Kentucky Colonels	$60,000	
1	Boston Celtics (Passed up on using this selection.)							
1	Denver Nuggets (Passed up on using this selection.)							
1	Golden State Warriors (Passed up on using this selection.)							
2	Chicago Bulls (Passed up on using this selection.)							
2	Atlanta Hawks (Passed up on using this selection.)							
2	12	Mike Barr	G	United States	Kansas City Kings	Spirits of St. Louis	$15,000	
2	Detroit Pistons (Passed up on using this selection.)							
2	Portland Trail Blazers (Passed up on using this selection.)							
2	New York Knicks (Passed up on using this selection.)							
2	New Orleans Jazz (Passed up on using this selection.)							
2	Milwaukee Bucks (Passed up on using this selection.)							
2	Indiana Pacers (Passed up on using this selection.)							
2	Los Angeles Lakers (Passed up on using this selection.)							
2	Houston Rockets (Passed up on using this selection.)							
2	Phoenix Suns (Passed up on using this selection.)							
2	Seattle SuperSonics (Passed up on using this selection.)							
2	Philadelphia 76ers (Passed up on using this selection.)							
2	Buffalo Braves (Passed up on using this selection.)							
2	Washington Bullets (Passed up on using this selection.)							
2	San Antonio Spurs (Passed up on using this selection.)							
2	Cleveland Cavaliers (Passed up on using this selection.)							
2	New York Nets (Passed up on using this selection.)							
2	Boston Celtics (Passed up on using this selection.)							
2	Denver Nuggets (Passed up on using this selection.)							
2	Golden State Warriors (Passed up on using this selection.)							
3	Chicago Bulls (Passed up on using this selection.)							
3	Atlanta Hawks (Passed up on using this selection.)							
3	Kansas City Kings (Passed up on using this selection.)							
3	Detroit Pistons (Passed up on using this selection.)							
3	Portland Trail Blazers (Passed up on using this selection.)							
3	New York Knicks (Passed up on using this selection.)							
3	New Orleans Jazz (Passed up on using this selection.)							
3	Milwaukee Bucks (Passed up on using this selection.)							
3	Indiana Pacers (Passed up on using this selection.)							
3	Los Angeles Lakers (Passed up on using this selection.)							
3	Houston Rockets (Passed up on using this selection.)							
3	Phoenix Suns (Passed up on using this selection.)							
3	Seattle SuperSonics (Passed up on using this selection.)							
3	Philadelphia 76ers (Passed up on using this selection.)							
3	Buffalo Braves (Passed up on using this selection.)							
3	Washington Bullets (Passed up on using this selection.)							
3	San Antonio Spurs (Passed up on using this selection.)							
3	Cleveland Cavaliers (Passed up on using this selection.)							
3	New York Nets (Passed up on using this selection.)							
3	Boston Celtics (Passed up on using this selection.)							
3	Denver Nuggets (Passed up on using this selection.)							
3	Golden State Warriors (Passed up on using this selection.)							

a: The Atlanta Hawks traded the ABA dispersal draft rights of Maurice Lucas to the Portland Trail Blazers for Steve Hawes and Geoff Petrie.
b: The Buffalo Braves swapped around ABA dispersal draft right spots with the Milwaukee Bucks (leading to Buffalo drafting Bird Averitt and Milwaukee not drafting anyone with their new spot whatsoever), with the Bucks also getting the Braves' 1977 second round pick (which became Glen Williams) as secondary compensation for not using their dispersal draft pick when they had the chance to do so.
