= Zwierlein =

Zwierlein is a surname. Notable people with the surname include:

- Martin Zwierlein (fl. 2007), German physicist
- Ron Zwierlein (born 1944), American athletic administrator
