= Ron Zwierlein =

American coach and administrator

Biographical details
- Born: June 3, 1944 (age 82); Rochester, New York, U.S.
- Education: Bowling Green State University

Playing career

Diving
- 1965–1968: Bowling Green

Coaching career (HC unless noted)

Swimming and diving
- 1975–1981: John Carroll
- 1981–1984: Bowling Green

Diving
- 1985–1986: Bowling Green

Administrative career (AD unless noted)
- 1978–1981: John Carroll
- 1994–1999: Bowling Green
- 2004–2007: St. Bonaventure
- 2014–2015: St. Bonaventure

Head coaching record
- Overall: 137–54
- Tournaments: 0–1

Accomplishments and honors

Championships
- PAC (1981)

Ronald Zwierlein (born June 3, 1944) is an American athletic administrator who was the athletic director at John Carroll University, Bowling Green State University, and St. Bonaventure University.

== Early life ==
Zwierlein attended Bowling Green State University from 1964 to 1968. He was a member of the swimming and diving team and was team co-captain his senior season. He also performed as school mascot Freddie Falcon during basketball games.

== John Carroll University ==
In 1975, Zwierlein became John Carroll University's first swim coach. During the 1981 season, the Blue Streaks only lost two meets, upset a number of Division I teams to win the Notre Dame Invitational Relays, won their first Presidents' Athletic Conference title, and finished seventh at the NCAA Division III swimming and diving championships. During his tenure at the school, he compiled a 45–17 record and coached a total of 26 All-Americans. From 1978 to 1981, he was also the school's athletic director. He was inducted into JCU's athletic hall of fame in 1989. His 1981 swim team was inducted in 2018.

== Bowling Green State University ==
In 1981, Zwierlein returned to his alma mater as head coach of the men's and women's swim teams. In 1984, he became assistant director of Bowling Green's student recreation center. He stepped down as swim coach, but remained on as diving coach for two more seasons. His overall record at BGSU was 92–37 and he coached 19 All-Americans.

He became interim director of the student recreation in July 1991 and oversaw construction of the BGSU Fieldhouse. He was he was promoted to director of recreational sports in August 1992 and the following year was named interim vice president of student affairs.

In 1994, Zwierlein succeeded Jack Gregory as Bowling Green's athletic director. Under Zwierlein's leadership BGSU won the Jacoby Trophy in 1994–95 and the Reese Trophy in 1994–95 and 1995–96. These awards are given to the best athletic program in the Mid-American Conference, with the Reese Trophy going to the best men's program and the Jacoby Trophy going to the best women's program. In 1994 and 1995, Bowling Green had the highest student-athlete GPA in the Mid-American Conference. Zwierlein also launched BGSU's women's soccer program and hired the school's first black head coach. In 1999, he was promoted to senior associate vice president for student affairs. He was inducted into Bowling Green's athletic hall of fame in 2018.

== St. Bonaventure University ==
In 2004, St. Bonaventure selected Zwierlein to be its athletic director. He took over a department that was marred by scandal due to the use of an ineligible player by the men's basketball team the previous season. In the aftermath, the Bonnies were stripped of six wins, placed on three-years probation, and barred from postseason play in 2004. Coach Jan van Breda Kolff was fired, athletic director Gothard Lane and president Robert J. Wickenheiser resigned, and chairman of the school's trustees, William Swan, committed suicide. Zwierlein helped create and implement a five-year strategic plan for the athletic department and completed its NCAA Division I certification in 2005. He retired in 2007, but returned to the school on an interim basis in 2014 after athletic director Steve Watson left to take the same job at Loyola University Chicago.
