= Wickenheiser =

Wickenheiser is a surname. Notable people with the surname include:

- Doug Wickenheiser (1961–1999), Canadian ice hockey player
- Hayley Wickenheiser (born 1978), Canadian ice hockey player
- Robert J. Wickenheiser (1942–2015), American book collector
