= List of Kentucky Colonels executives =

The following served as executives of the Kentucky Colonels basketball team in the American Basketball Association from the league's founding in 1967 through its merger with the NBA in 1976.

- Jack Ankerson
- John Y. Brown, Jr.
- Alex Groza
- Gene Rhodes
- Adolph Rupp
- Mike Storen
