= Anderson County High School (Kentucky) =

Coordinates: 38°1′24″N 84°54′30″W

Location
- 1 Bearcat Drive; Lawrenceburg, Kentucky 40342; United States

Information
- Type: Public
- Established: 1965
- School district: Anderson County Schools
- Principal: Chris Glass
- Teaching staff: 64.88 (FTE)
- Grades: 9–12
- Enrollment: 1,157 (2024-2025)
- Student to teacher ratio: 17.83
- Color
- Nickname: Bearcats
- Feeder schools: Anderson County Middle School
- Website: https://www.anderson.k12.ky.us/andersoncountyhighschool_home.aspx

Anderson County High School (ACHS) is a public high school situated in Lawrenceburg, Kentucky, United States. The school mascot is Benny the Bearcat and its colors are red, white and blue. Anderson County High School is currently the only high school in Anderson County, Kentucky. During the 2021–2022 academic year, the school had an enrollment of 1,186 students.

== Awards ==
Archery: First place, high school division, 2015 KY State NASP/IBO 3DTournament.

Marching Band: KMEA State Champion Class AAAA (2017, 2021, 2024)

Wrestling: Corban Nance, State Champion (2024–2025), 126 lbs. In doing so, Nance becomes the very first state champion in any KHSAA sanctioned sport in Anderson County High School history.

== Notable alumnus ==
- Jimmy Dan Conner — American former basketball player for the Kentucky Wildcats, drafted into the NBA by the Phoenix Suns
