= Anderson County Schools (Kentucky) =

School district in Kentucky, United States

Location
- Anderson County, Kentucky United States

District information
- Grades: K–12
- Superintendent: Sheila Mitchell
- School board: Anderson County Board of Education
- Chair of the board: Scott Luna
- Schools: 7
- Budget: $41,308,635

Students and staff
- Students: 3,555
- Teachers: 220

Other information
- Website: Official website

Anderson County Schools is the operating school district for Anderson County, Kentucky. The district is governed by the Anderson County Board of Education, of which the current Superintendent is Sheila Mitchell. As of 2020, the district enrolled 3,555 students across 7 schools with 220 full-time teachers.

== Schools ==
=== High school ===
- Anderson County High School - Lawrenceburg, Kentucky

=== Middle school ===
- Anderson County Middle School - Lawrenceburg, Kentucky

=== Elementary schools ===
- Emma B. Ward Elementary School - Lawrenceburg, Kentucky
- Robert B. Turner Elementary School - Lawrenceburg, Kentucky
- Saffell Street Elementary School - Lawrenceburg, Kentucky

In addition to five traditional K–12 schools, the district also operates Anderson Community Education, the Anderson County Early Childhood Regional Training Center, the Ezra Sparrow Early Childhood Center and the Trailblazer Early College and Career Academy.

== Anderson County Board of Education ==
The Anderson County Board of Education is composed of five elected board members. As of December 2020, the current board consists of:

| Name | Position |
|---|---|
| James Sargent | Board Chair |
| Peggy Peach | Board Vice Chair |
| Jason Collins | Board Member |
| Rose Morgan | Board Member |
| Scott Brown | Board Member |
