= Earl Foreman =

American lawyer and sports executive

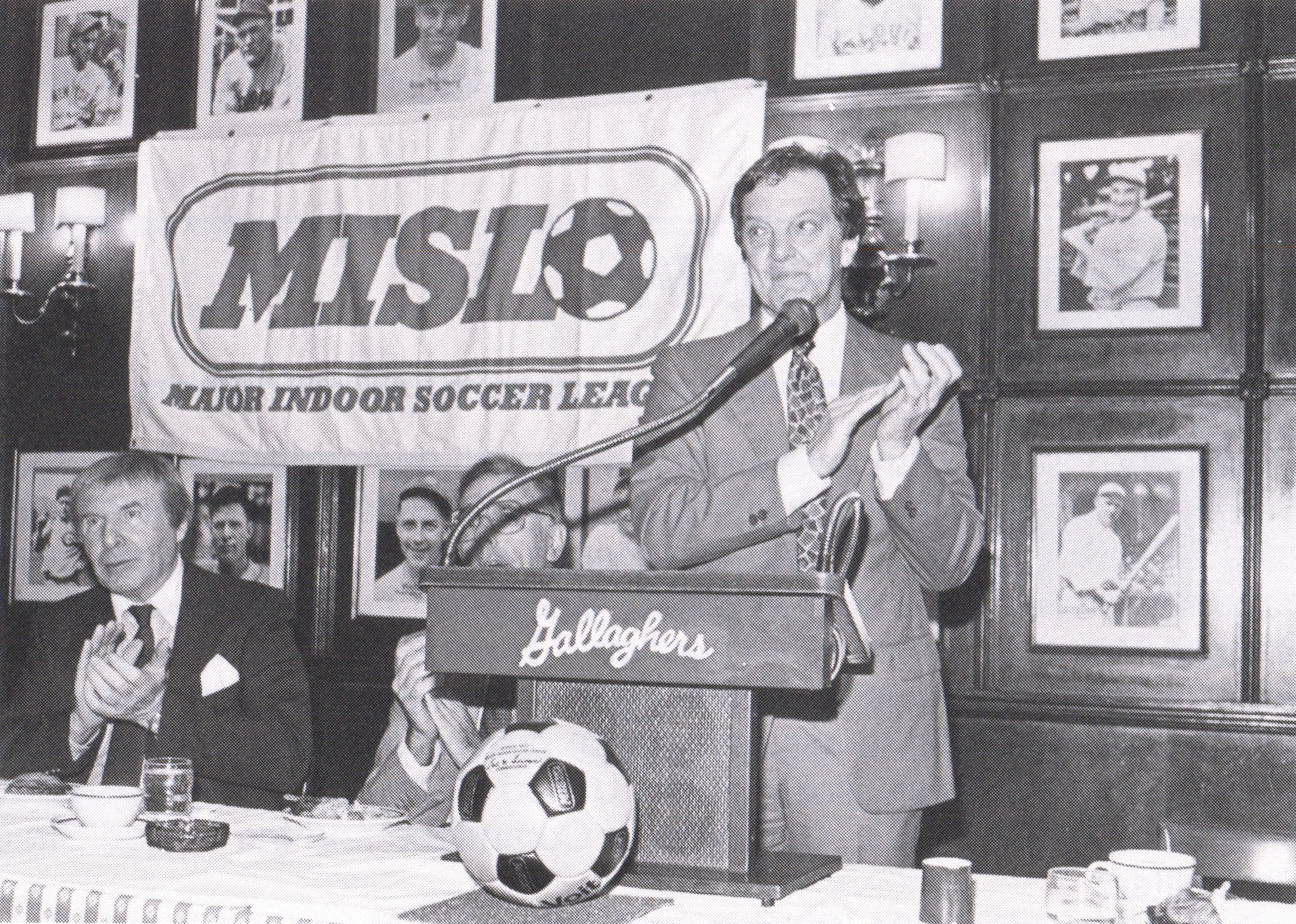
- Foreman at a 1984 Major Indoor Soccer League press conference in New York City applauding the admission of four teams to the MISL
- Born: March 29, 1924; Baltimore, Maryland, U.S.
- Died: January 23, 2017 (aged 92)
- Education: University of Maryland, College Park; University of Maryland School of Law
- Occupations: Lawyer; sports executive
- Spouse: Phyllis Foreman
- Children: 3

Earl Marin Foreman (March 29, 1924 – January 23, 2017) was an American lawyer and sports executive.

Foreman practiced law in the District of Columbia (Washington D.C.). He was the owner of the short-lived Washington Whips professional soccer club of the NASL and a minority owner of the Baltimore Bullets franchise in the National Basketball Association. He was the owner of the Washington Caps/Virginia Squires of the American Basketball Association. At one time, he also owned an interest in the Philadelphia Eagles of the National Football League.

== Early life ==
Born in Baltimore, Maryland. Foreman served in the United States Army during World War II and he was a medic. He graduated from the University of Maryland in College Park and University of Maryland School of Law.

== Basketball ==
He, along with Abe Pollin and real estate investor/former NBA referee Arnold Heft purchased the then-Baltimore Bullets from Dave Trager for $1.1 million on November 23, 1964.

On August 21, 1969, Foreman, with Thomas Shaheen and Louis Diamond, purchased the Oakland Oaks professional basketball team in the American Basketball Association. The group inherited a championship-caliber nucleus led by Rick Barry, whom Foreman called "the hottest attraction in basketball." The franchise also was heavily indebted after winning the Oaks' only championship, however, which was a situation that would haunt the team following its move until its demise in 1976 just prior to the ABA–NBA merger.

Foreman and the two co-owners paid $2.6 million for the team and moved it to Washington, D.C. where it became the Washington Caps for the 1969–1970 ABA season. The Caps brought on Al Bianchi as head coach and finished the season with a record of 44–40, good for third place in the Western Division. The Caps lost in the first round of the 1970 ABA Playoffs to the Denver Rockets in seven games. For the 1970–71 season, Foreman moved the Caps to Roanoke, Virginia and the team became the Virginia Squires. Strapped for cash due to debts, the Squires traded Warren Jabali to the Kentucky Colonels for a draft pick and cash, and sold Barry to the New York Nets for $250,000. The Squires finished in first place in the Eastern Division with a 55–29 record. In the 1971 ABA Playoffs, the Squires defeated the New York Nets in six games in the first round, but lost the Eastern Division Finals to the Kentucky Colonels in six games. With the conclusion of the season, on April 6, 1971, the Squires signed future star Julius Erving to a 4-year, $500,000 contract.

The Squires finished the 1971–72 season with a record of 45–39, good for second place in the Eastern Division. The Squires defeated swept the Miami Floridians in the first round of the 1972 ABA Playoffs but then lost the full seven-game Eastern Division Finals to the New York Nets. During the season, Johnny Kerr joined the team as administrative vice president. The Squires finished the 1972–73 season with a 42–42 record which put them in third place in the Eastern Division. The Squires lost in the 1973 Eastern Division Semifinals in five games to the Kentucky Colonels despite outstanding play by Erving. At the conclusion of the season, Foreman added George Gervin to the Squires' roster, putting two future Hall of Famers on the same team.

In August 1973, Foreman, again motivated by the Squires' indebtedness, traded Erving and Willie Sojourner to the New York Nets for George Carter, the rights to Kermit Washington and $1 million. Discussing his sales and trades of the Squires' best players, Foreman said, "It's not a pleasant thing to hear, but I did what I had to do out of necessity. This is not a public utility. I can't ask for a fare increase when things go bad." The Squires signed center Swen Nater but then sold Nater to the San Antonio Spurs for a draft pick and $300,000. Just after Gervin played in the 1974 ABA All-Star Game (which the Squires hosted), it was announced that Foreman had sold Gervin to the San Antonio Spurs for $225,000. Legal action ensued but Gervin ended up with the Spurs.

By that time, the constant selling off of the team's star players had a major effect on the Squires' dwindling fan base. The team finished the 1973–74 season with a record of 28–56 which actually was good for fourth place in the Eastern Division, but the Squires lost in the first round of the 1973 ABA Playoffs to the New York Nets in five games.

During the ensuing off season Barry Parkhill of the Squires, angry about bouncing paychecks filed suit against Foreman, the Squires and the ABA for $24,000 in back pay and $360,000 for anticipated breach of contract. Jack Ankerson became the Squires' general manager while the league then purchased the Squires franchise. In its last two years, the debt-ridden Squires finished 15–69 both seasons, the worst records in ABA history, and failed to make the playoffs. The team came to an end on May 11, 1976, after its failure to pay a $75,000 league assessment. While there was no chance of a regional team being part of the ABA–NBA merger, the Squires' demise cost them a chance to be compensated when the merger took place just weeks later.

== Soccer ==
In 1977 through 1978, Foreman was instrumental in creating the Major Indoor Soccer League. He was the commissioner of the MISL from 1978 to 1985, and again in 1989.

== Personal ==
Earl Foreman died on January 23, 2017. He was survived by his wife, Phyllis (who was the older sister of Ed Snider) and their sons, Scott, Ronald, and Stuart.
