= Rick Darnell =

American basketball player

Personal information
- Born: January 1, 1953 (age 73) Anaheim, California
- Listed height: 6 ft 11 in (2.11 m)
- Listed weight: 225 lb (102 kg)

Career information
- High school: Magnolia (Anaheim, California)
- College: Cypress (1970–1972); Indiana State (1972–1973); San Jose State (1974–1975)
- NBA draft: 1975: undrafted
- Position: Center
- Number: 24

Career history
- 1975–1976: Virginia Squires
- Stats at Basketball Reference

Richard Darnell (born January 1, 1953) is a retired professional basketball center who spent one season in the American Basketball Association (ABA) with the Virginia Squires during the 1975–76 season. He completed his collegiate career at San Jose State University, after two seasons (1970–71, 1971–72) at Cypress College and one season (1972–73) at Indiana State.

He averaged 17.5 points and 12.8 rebounds during his career at Cypress; he remains tied for ninth in career rebounds for the Chargers. He averaged 9.7 points and 8.1 rebounds during his one season at Indiana State & 10.2 points and 8.1 rebounds during his season at San Jose State.

Rick Darnell currently coaches basketball to underprivileged children in South Los Angeles.
