= Bill Musselman =

American basketball coach (1940–2000)

Biographical details
- Born: September 13, 1940; Wooster, Ohio, U.S.
- Died: May 5, 2000 (aged 59); Rochester, Minnesota, U.S.
- Education: Wittenberg

Coaching career (HC unless noted)
- 1966–1971: Ashland University
- 1971–1975: Minnesota
- 1975: San Diego Sails
- 1975–1976: Virginia Squires
- 1978–1979: Reno Bighorns
- 1980–1982: Cleveland Cavaliers
- 1983–1984: Sarasota Stingers
- 1984–1987: Rapid City Thrillers
- 1987–1988: Albany Patroons
- 1989–1991: Minnesota Timberwolves
- 1993–1994: Rochester Renegades
- 1995–1997: South Alabama
- 1997–2000: Portland Trail Blazers (assistant)

Head coaching record
- Overall: College totals: 170–52, .766 pct. (NCAA); Pro record totals: 385–334, .535 pct. NBA record: 78–180, .302 pct. ABA record: 12–30 .286 pct. CBA record: 267–114, .701 pct. WBA record: 28–20, .583 pct.

Accomplishments and honors

Championships
- 4× CBA champion (1985–1988)

Awards
- CBA Coach of the Year (1988)

William Clifford Musselman (September 13, 1940 – May 5, 2000) was an American basketball coach in the NCAA, the ABA, the WBA, the CBA, and the NBA.

== Early life ==
Musselman was the second of five children. His father, Clifford Musselman, was an auto mechanic and band promoter. His mother, Bertha (Combs) Miller, later married James Miller. The young Musselman played basketball, football, and baseball at Wooster High School in Wooster, Ohio. When he graduated in 1958, he was the school's second all-time leading scorer. After high school, he attended Wittenberg College (now Wittenberg University) in Springfield, Ohio, where he played basketball for Ray Mears.

== Career ==
=== Kent State University High School ===
In 1963, at the age of 23, Musselman was hired as the head men's basketball coach at Kent State University High School in Kent, Ohio. In Musselman's first season of coaching, the KSUHS Statesmen finished 14–5 and earned a share of the conference title.

=== Ashland University (NCAA) ===
In 1964, after one season of coaching high school basketball, Musselman was hired to assist with the football and basketball teams at Ashland University in Ashland, Ohio. In August 1965, Ashland's head basketball coach left for another coaching position. With only a few months before the start of the 1965–66 season, Musselman was promoted to head coach. In his first season, at the age of 25, he guided the Eagles to a 10–10 record. Over the next five seasons, Musselman's Ashland teams had a collective record of 109–20.

While at Ashland, Musselman's teams reached the NCAA College Division Tournament (the predecessor to the current Division II and Division III Tournaments) four times and had 13 All-America players. His 1968–69 Ashland team allowed an NCAA-record-low 33.9 points per game.

=== University of Minnesota (NCAA) ===
Following the 1970–71 season, Musselman left Ashland for the University of Minnesota.

In 1971–72, he led the Gophers to an 18–7 record and their first Big Ten Championship in 53 years with a roster featuring Dave Winfield, Jim Brewer, Bobby Nix, Keith Young, Clyde Turner, Corky Taylor, and Ron Behagen. The Gophers lost to Florida State in the first round of the NCAA Tournament, 70–56, before rebounding in the Midwest Region Consolation Round, downing Marquette, 77–72.

The following season (1972–73), Musselman guided the Gophers to a 21–5 mark. Minnesota began the season ranked fourth in the nation and ranked as high as No. 3 in the country in March 1973.

During the 1973–74 campaign, the Gophers dropped to 12–12 under Musselman. His starting lineup that season featured Flip Saunders, who would go on to have a successful NBA coaching career.

In his fourth and final season at Minnesota, Musselman's team went 18–8 and included a roster of future NBA players Mychal Thompson, Mark Landsberger, and Mark Olberding. His overall coaching record at Minnesota is 61–32 with a .656 winning percentage. During Musselman's time at the University of Minnesota, home attendance increased from 4,000 per game to nearly 18,000 per game, according to The New York Times.

Musselman's tenure at Minnesota was tainted. There was an incident during the 1971–72 season when Taylor and Behagen assaulted Ohio State center Luke Witte. The attack on Witte came near the end of the Gophers-Buckeyes game. Witte was seriously injured, taken off the court on a stretcher and hospitalized with injuries, including to an eye, that negatively impacted his basketball career. Two other Ohio State players were also hospitalized as a result of the brawl. Musselman maintained that he had nothing to do with the incident. Still, critics claimed he had stirred his players into a frenzy before the game that night and encouraged overly aggressive play. A September 1, 1985, article in The New York Times described Musselman's Gophers as "an extremely physical basketball team."

After Musselman left to coach in the ABA, the NCAA placed the Gophers on probation after discovering more than 100 rule violations.

=== San Diego Sails (ABA) ===
On July 28, 1975, Musselman left the college ranks to join the pro game when he was hired to coach the San Diego Sails of the American Basketball Association. The team only lasted for 11 games of the 1975–76 season before folding with a 3–8 record.

According to the book Obsession, by Bill Heller, Musselman signed a three-year contract worth more than $135,000, considerably more than the $23,000 salary he had received at the University of Minnesota.

=== Virginia Squires (ABA) ===
A week after the ABA's San Diego franchise folded on November 11, 1975, Musselman was hired to coach the league's Virginia Squires. Musselman went 4–22 with the Squires before he was replaced by Jack Ankerson on January 21, 1976.

In the book Obsession, by Bill Heller, Musselman said, "I found the players [in Virginia] were talking more about the [team's] financial troubles than basketball. They worried more about the next payroll than they did about the next practice. It was difficult for them to concentrate on basketball."

=== Reno (Nevada) Bighorns (WBA) ===
Musselman took two years away from coaching to work in real estate before returning in 1978–79 to coach the Reno Bighorns of the Western Basketball Association. That season, he led the club to a 28–20 record and the only WBA title game. Led by Randy Ayers and Gus Bailey, Reno lost to Herb Brown's Tucson Gunners, four games to three, in the 1979 championship. The league folded soon thereafter.

=== Cleveland Cavaliers (NBA) ===
Ted Stepien, then owner of the NBA's Cleveland Cavaliers, hired Musselman to his first NBA head coaching job in 1980. Musselman guided the team to a 25–46 mark before he was replaced by general manager Don Delaney. He was derisively called "Musclehead" by WWWE sports radio host Pete Franklin who was a vociferous critic of how Stepien was operating the Cavaliers.

On March 8, 1982, Stepien fired Chuck Daly, who was 9–32 as coach of the Cavs, and replaced him on an interim basis with Musselman, then the team's director of player personnel. The Cavs went 2–21 under Musselman, who finished the season as head coach. Musselman resigned on October 21, 1982, just a few days before the start of the 1982–83 NBA season.

In an April 17, 1994 New York Times article, former NBA forward Cedric Maxwell said the Cavs' veteran players during that time "were known more for partying than for playing."

=== Sarasota (Fla.) Stingers (CBA) ===
Musselman's foray into minor league basketball began in 1983 when he was hired to coach the Sarasota (Fla.) Stingers of the Continental Basketball Association (CBA). Just 19 games into the season, sporting a 6–13 record, Musselman was fired.

=== Tampa Bay/Rapid City Thrillers (CBA) ===
The following season, Musselman moved a few miles up the Florida Gulf Coast to St. Petersburg, where he was hired to coach the expansion Tampa Bay Thrillers of the CBA.

As an expansion team, his 1984–85 Thrillers team rolled to a 45–18 record to win the CBA title, downing the Detroit Spirits in seven games. Tampa Bay repeated as CBA champions the following season going 46–19 and defeating the LaCrosse (Wisc.) Catbirds in five games, 4–1.

The "three-peat" followed in 1986–87 in Rapid City, South Dakota, where the team had moved at the conclusion of the regular season. The Thrillers, who went 46–16 overall, lost the first game of the finals to the Rockford (Ill.) Lightning, before winning four consecutive games as Musselman won his third consecutive CBA championship. For his efforts, Musselman was honored as CBA Coach of the Year.

=== Albany Patroons (CBA) ===
On June 19, 1987, Musselman jumped to the Albany (NY) Patroons for the 1987–88 CBA season, guiding the Pats to a remarkable 48–6 record and his fourth consecutive league title. Musselman was named CBA Coach of the Year for the second time following the 1987–88 season.

=== Minnesota Timberwolves (NBA) ===
Following his success in the CBA, on August 23, 1988, Musselman was hired as the head coach of the expansion Minnesota Timberwolves. With a roster "full of vagabonds, long shots and characters," according to the Minneapolis Star Tribune, Musselman's Wolves posted a 22–60 record in 1989–90, their first season, and 29–53 the following season. Musselman was fired on April 22, 1991, a day after the 1990–91 season ended. But the 29 wins under Musselman were a high-water mark for the T-wolves, who failed to top 29 wins until 1996–97. Musselman's expansion team won more games than any of the four expansion teams and more in his second season (29) than any expansion team since the 1974–75 New Orleans Jazz.

In a March 29, 2007, Minneapolis Star Tribune article by Steve Aschburner, Pooh Richardson, a member of the expansion Timberwolves, said: "We were the best expansion team out there. That was as good as going to the playoffs. That's one thing that Musselman always gave us: a chance to win. Pass the ball, pass the ball, cut down the shots for the other team." Musselman highlighted his style of doggedly exploiting the other team's weaknesses when on a February 4, 1990 game against the Golden State Warriors, he called the same play all game in an attempt to get coach Don Nelson to double-team big man Randy Breuer in his matchup against lighter defenders Manute Bol and Jim Petersen in order to free up guards Pooh Richardson and Tony Campbell. Although the Wolves lost the game 106–96, it resulted in Breuer scoring a career high 40 points.

=== Rochester (Minn.) Renegade (CBA) ===
On July 22, 1993, Musselman returned to the CBA for the 1993–94 season, this time in an attempt to revive the Rochester Renegade, a struggling franchise that had gone 6–50 the previous season. Rochester finished 31–25 under Musselman, a 25-win improvement. The team folded following the season.

=== University of South Alabama (NCAA) ===
In March 1995, Musselman returned to the NCAA after a 25-year absence with the University of South Alabama. In two seasons, he led the Jaguars to the 1997 NCAA tournament after turning the program around from a 9–18 record. Musselman's 1997 South Alabama team went 23–7 and nearly upset eventual champion Arizona in the opening round of the NCAA tournament. Musselman resigned as coach of the Jags on October 7, 1997, to return to the NBA.

=== Portland Trail Blazers (NBA) ===
On October 8, 1997, after two successful seasons as head coach at the University of South Alabama, Musselman returned to the NBA as an assistant with the Portland Trail Blazers, under Mike Dunleavy Sr. This marked the first time in his professional coaching career that he served as an assistant. Musselman served as an assistant for three seasons with the Blazers before his death in May 2000.

== Coaching style and legacy ==
During his stint as coach of the ABA's Virginia Squires, Musselman "antagonized so-called problem players ... and docile ones," according to a January 3, 1981, article in The New York Times. Musselman claimed "the only time I yell is before a game and at halftime," explaining that his passion helps players give "maximum effort every second."

In Charley Walters' December 23, 2012, column in the St. Paul Pioneer Press, Oklahoma City Thunder head coach Scott Brooks is quoted as saying, "One of the things I've taken from [Bill Musselman] is doing it every day, being consistent and never changing—always stick with what you do. He was a creature of habit. He drove the same way to get to practice, the same way to get to the airport. Our practices were so consistent. I wouldn't be in my position today if he hadn't taken me on as a CBA player. He taught me the ropes, how to play with toughness. There were no excuses with him—you had to play hard every night."

Musselman was known for his intensity. He was once quoted as saying, "Defeat is worse than death because you have to live with defeat."

According to former CBA coach Charley Rosen, Musselman possessed an "admirable sense of fairness." In an ESPN.com article, Rosen described a scene in which Musselman berated referees for being unfair to the opposing team. Musselman reportedly said, "'If I can't win a game fairly, then I'd rather lose'".

In the newspaper articles and columns following his death, Musselman was described as "volatile," "colorful," "intense," and "fiery."

In a May 8, 2000, letter to the editor of The Minnesota Daily, the newspaper of the University of Minnesota, Dr. R. Galen Hanson wrote, "By far – far and away – the memories I will always have of coach Bill Musselman is that he is one of the most unforgettable people I have ever met: winner, writer, teacher, coach. Always."

A number of Musselman's former assistant coaches and players went on to coach in the NBA, including Sidney Lowe (Minnesota Timberwolves), Tyrone Corbin (Utah Jazz), Tom Thibodeau (Minnesota Timberwolves), Scott Brooks (Oklahoma City Thunder), Sam Mitchell (Toronto Raptors), and his son Eric Musselman (Sacramento Kings and Golden State Warriors).

== Personal life and death ==
Musselman had three children: two sons and a daughter. His oldest son Eric, formerly head coach of the Golden State Warriors and Sacramento Kings, is head coach of the USC Trojans men's basketball team. They were the first father and son to hold the title of NBA head coach.

=== Death ===
Musselman suffered a stroke on October 30, 1999, following Portland's preseason game against the Phoenix Suns. Musselman, who had served as head coach during the game after Mike Dunleavy was ejected, collapsed after leaving the arena. In April 2000, he was diagnosed with primary systemic amyloidosis, a disease that produces an abnormal protein that collects in tissues and interferes with the function of organs. He died on May 5, 2000, at 2:45 a.m., at the age of 59, at the Mayo Clinic in Rochester, Minnesota. The cause of death was heart and kidney failure.

The Trail Blazers used Musselman as an inspiration for their 2000 playoff run, which ended in the Western Conference finals against the Los Angeles Lakers. In the team's 2000–01 media guide, which was dedicated to Musselman, he was described as "a keen strategist and an inspiring motivator."

== Head coaching record ==
=== NBA ===
Legend
Regular season	G	Games coached	W	Games won	L	Games lost	W–L %	Win–loss %
Playoffs	PG	Playoff games	PW	Playoff wins	PL	Playoff losses	PW–L %	Playoff win–loss %

Team	Year	G	W	L	W–L%	Finish	PG	PW	PL	PW–L%	Result
Cleveland	1980–81	71	25	46	.352	6th in Central	—	—	—	—	Missed playoffs
Cleveland	1981–82	23	2	21	.080	(fired)	—	—	—	—	－
Minnesota	1989–90	82	22	60	.268	6th in Midwest	—	—	—	—	Missed playoffs
Minnesota	1990–91	82	29	53	.354	5th in Midwest	—	—	—	—	Missed playoffs
Career		258	78	180	.302		—	—	—	—	

=== ABA ===
Team	Year	G	W	L	W–L%	Finish	PG	PW	PL	PW–L%	Result
San Diego	1975–76	11	3	8	.273	(team folded)	—	—	—	—	—
Virginia	1975–76	26	4	22	.154	(Left mid-season)	—	—	—	—	—
Career		37	7	30	.189		—	—	—	—	

Preceded by Beryl Shipley	San Diego Sails Head Coach; 1975	Succeeded by N/A – team folded
Preceded by Mack Calvin	Virginia Squires Head Coach; 1975–1976	Succeeded by Jack Ankerson
