= Jan van Breda Kolff =

American basketball player and college basketball coach

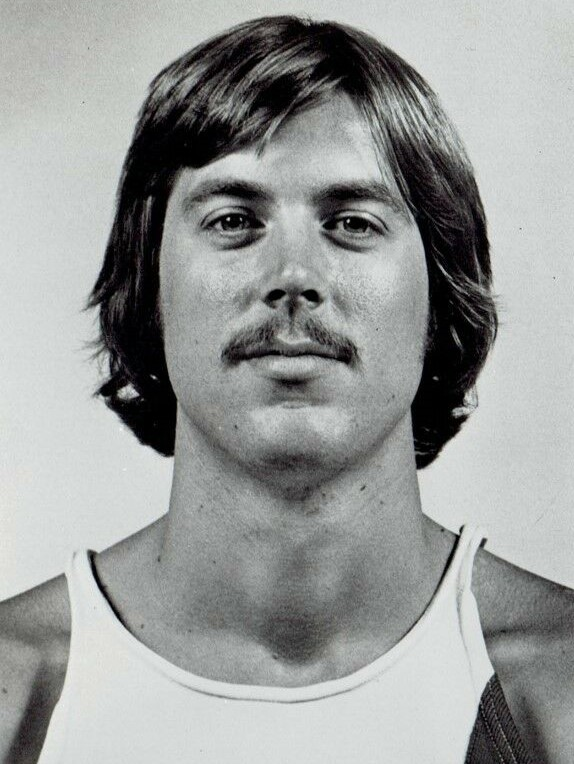

Personal information
- Born: December 16, 1951 (age 74) Palos Verdes, California, U.S.
- Listed height: 6 ft 7 in (2.01 m)
- Listed weight: 195 lb (88 kg)

Career information
- High school: Palos Verdes (Palos Verdes, California)
- College: Vanderbilt (1971–1974)
- NBA draft: 1974: 2nd round, 20th overall pick
- Drafted by: Portland Trail Blazers
- Playing career: 1974–1985
- Position: Small forward
- Number: 32, 5, 20, 22

Career history

Playing
- 1974–1975: Denver Nuggets
- 1975–1976: Virginia Squires
- 1976: Kentucky Colonels
- 1976–1983: New York / New Jersey Nets
- 1983–1985: Granarolo Bologna

Coaching
- 1983–1985: Granarolo Bologna (player coach)
- 1985–1991: Princeton (assistant)
- 1991–1993: Cornell
- 1993–1999: Vanderbilt
- 1999–2001: Pepperdine
- 2001–2003: St. Bonaventure
- 2003–2004: New Orleans Hornets (assistant)
- 2008–2010: Nashville Broncos / Music City Stars

Career highlights
- As player: Italian League champion (1984); Italian Cup winner (1984); SEC Player of the Year (1974); As coach: WCC regular season champion (2000)

Career ABA and NBA statistics
- Points: 3,696 (6.2 ppg)
- Rebounds: 2,572 (4.3 rpg)
- Assists: 1,178 (2.0 apg)
- Stats at NBA.com
- Stats at Basketball Reference

Jan van Breda Kolff (born December 16, 1951) is an American former professional basketball player and college coach. The son of coach Butch van Breda Kolff and grandson of Dutch soccer player Jan van Breda Kolff, he played from 1974 to 1976 for the Denver Nuggets, Kentucky Colonels, and Virginia Squires in the American Basketball Association, and 1976 to 1983 for the New York/New Jersey Nets in the National Basketball Association. From 1970 to 1974 he played for Vanderbilt University, and in 1974 he led the Commodores to a Southeastern Conference championship as SEC Player of the Year.

He also spent two years in Italy, from 1983 to 1985, helping Italian team Virtus Bologna win a championship.

== Coaching career ==
Van Breda Kolff was a player coach while playing in Italy. Then he became an assistant coach at Princeton in either 1985 or 1987.

Van Breda Kolff began his head coaching career in 1991 at Cornell University, where he compiled a 23–29 record over two years. In 1993, he was hired to coach at his alma mater, Vanderbilt University, where his teams achieved a 104–81 record over six seasons, in which the team finished between third and fifth place in the Southeastern Conference each year and made the National Invitation Tournament three times and the NCAA Division I men's basketball tournament in 1997. He left Vanderbilt in 1999 to coach at Pepperdine University. In his first year there, the team played in the NCAA tournament and upset perennial-power Indiana in what would be head coach Bobby Knight’s final game at the school. In 2001, van Breda Kolff became head coach at St. Bonaventure, where the team reached the NIT second round in his first year.

Van Breda Kolff's tenure at St. Bonaventure ended abruptly in controversy late in the 2002–03 season. St. Bonaventure declared junior college transfer Jamil Terrell eligible to play without sitting out a year (as he would have been under NCAA rules if he had earned an associate degree), even though Terrell had only earned a welding certificate. Athletic director Gothard Lane had told school president Robert Wickenheiser that Terrell was ineligible to play that year. However, Wickenheiser, under prodding from his son Kort, who was also one of Van Breda Kolff's assistants, unilaterally declared Terrell eligible. School officials didn't seek guidance from the NCAA about Terrell's eligibility until the 2002–03 season was nearly over. The Bonnies were forced to forfeit every game in which Terrell played, and were also barred from the Atlantic 10 Conference tournament. In protest, the Bonnies players opted to sit out the last two games. Van Breda Kolff denied knowing about the scandal and was cleared of wrongdoing. He would later take on an assistant coach role for the New Orleans Hornets following the scandal's aftermath.

On April 25, 2007, he was named as one of three finalists to become the new head coach of UC Riverside's men's basketball program.

Van Breda Kolff was named coach of the Nashville Broncos of the American Basketball Association in 2008. He stayed with the team through its name change to the Music City Stars but lost his job when the team disbanded in 2010.

In 2025, van Breda Kolff began serving as the boys' and girls' basketball coach at St. Paul Christian Academy in Nashville, Tennessee.

== Career playing statistics ==
Legend
GP	Games played	GS	Games started	MPG	Minutes per game
FG%	Field goal percentage	3P%	3-point field goal percentage	FT%	Free throw percentage
RPG	Rebounds per game	APG	Assists per game	SPG	Steals per game
BPG	Blocks per game	PPG	Points per game	**Bold**	Career high
*	Led the league

=== ABA/NBA ===
==== Regular season ====
Year	Team	GP	GS	MPG	FG%	3P%	FT%	RPG	APG	SPG	BPG	PPG
1974–75	Denver (ABA)	**84***		19.5	.453	.000	.839	4.3	2.2	.6	.5	5.8
1975–76	Virginia (ABA)	37		30.2	.432	.250	.838	**6.5**	2.7	1.0	**1.5**	9.9
1975–76	Kentucky (ABA)	43		20.0	.495	**.500**	.824	4.5	1.9	.7	1.0	5.7
1976–77	N.Y. Nets	72		**33.3**	.445		**.855**	6.4	1.6	1.0	.9	**10.2**
1977–78	New Jersey	68		20.9	.366		.707	3.6	1.5	.8	.7	4.4
1978–79	New Jersey	80		25.0	.463		.798	4.8	2.3	1.1	.9	6.7
1979–80	New Jersey	82		29.3	.463	.350	.839	5.2	**3.0**	**1.2**	.9	6.8
1980–81	New Jersey	78		18.3	.408	.250	.838	2.6	1.7	.5	.6	3.8
1981–82	New Jersey	41	0	11.0	**.500**	.000	.816	1.2	.8	.3	.3	3.5
1982–83	New Jersey	13	0	4.8	.357	–	.833	1.0	.4	.2	.2	1.2
Career (ABA)		154		22.1	.455	.222	.836	4.8	2.2	.7	.8	6.7
Career (NBA)		434	0	23.4	.439	.300	.814	4.1	1.9	.8	.8	6.0
Career (overall)		598	0	23.0	.444	.282	.821	4.3	2.0	.8	.8	6.2

==== Playoffs ====
Year	Team	GP	MPG	FG%	3P%	FT%	RPG	APG	SPG	BPG	PPG
1975	Denver (ABA)	**12**	16.0	.425	–	**.935**	3.3	1.3	.3	.5	5.3
1976	Kentucky (ABA)	10	18.6	**.525**	–	.786	3.6	1.6	.6	.5	5.3
1979	New Jersey	2	**40.5**	.400		.833	**10.0**	**3.5**	.0	**1.5**	**10.5**
1982	New Jersey	2	8.0	.000	–	–	1.5	.0	**1.0**	.5	.0
Career (ABA)		22	17.2	.475	–	.889	3.5	1.4	.5	.5	5.3
Career (NBA)		4	24.3	.381	–	.833	5.8	1.8	.5	1.0	5.3
Career (overall)		26	18.3	.455	–	.882	3.8	1.5	.5	.6	5.3

== Head coaching record ==
Record table
Season	Team	Overall	Conference	Standing	Postseason
Cornell Big Red (Ivy League) (1991–1993)
1991–92	Cornell	7–19	5–9	5th	
1992–93	Cornell	16–10	9–5	3rd	
Cornell:		23–29 (.442)	14–14 (.500)		
Vanderbilt Commodores (Southeastern Conference) (1993–1999)
1993–94	Vanderbilt	20–12	9–7	3rd	NIT Runner-up
1994–95	Vanderbilt	13–15	6–10	4th	
1995–96	Vanderbilt	19–12	7–9	4th	NIT Second Round
1996–97	Vanderbilt	18–14	9–7	4th	NCAA Division I First Round
1997–98	Vanderbilt	20–13	7–9	T–4th	NIT Quarterfinal
1998–99	Vanderbilt	14–15	5–11	5th	
Vanderbilt:		104–81 (.562)	43–53 (.448)		
Pepperdine Waves (West Coast Conference) (1999–2001)
1999–00	Pepperdine	25–9	12–2	1st	NCAA Division I Second Round
2000–01	Pepperdine	22–9	12–2	2nd	NIT Second Round
Pepperdine:		47–18 (.723)	24–4 (.857)		
St. Bonaventure Bonnies (Atlantic 10 Conference) (2001–2003)
2001–02	St. Bonaventure	17–13	8–8	6th	NIT Second Round
2002–03	St. Bonaventure	13–14	7–9	7th	
St. Bonaventure:		30–27 (.526)	15–17 (.469)		
Total:		204–155 (.568)			
National champion Postseason invitational champion Conference regular season champion Conference regular season and conference tournament champion Division regular season champion Division regular season and conference tournament champion Conference tournament champion
