= Luther Burden =

American basketball player (1953–2015)

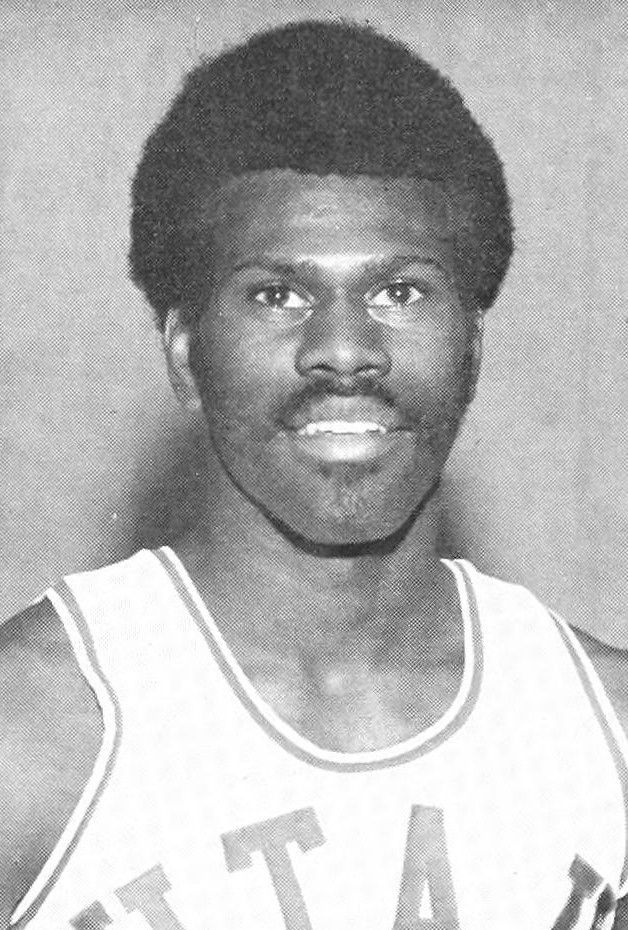
- Burden, circa 1974

Personal information
- Born: February 28, 1953 Haines City, Florida, U.S.
- Died: October 29, 2015 (aged 62) Winston-Salem, North Carolina, U.S.
- Listed height: 6 ft 2 in (1.88 m)
- Listed weight: 185 lb (84 kg)

Career information
- High school: Phillip Schuyler (Albany, New York)
- College: Utah (1972–1975)
- NBA draft: 1975: 2nd round, 26th overall pick
- Drafted by: New York Knicks
- Playing career: 1975–1978
- Position: Shooting guard
- Number: 15, 14

Career history
- 1975–1976: Virginia Squires
- 1976–1978: New York Knicks

Career highlights
- Consensus second-team All-American (1975); 2× First-team All-WAC (1974, 1975)

Career ABA and NBA statistics
- Points: 1,762 (13.1 ppg)
- Rebounds: 268 (2.0 rpg)
- Assists: 194 (1.4 apg)
- Stats at NBA.com
- Stats at Basketball Reference
Medals
Representing United States
Men's basketball
FIBA World Championship
Bronze medal – third place	1974 Puerto Rico	Team competition

Luther Dean "Ticky" Burden (February 28, 1953 – October 29, 2015) was an American NBA and ABA basketball player.

== High school ==
Born in Haines City, Florida, Burden attended Albany, New York's Philip Schuyler High School, where he was a member of the basketball team.

== College ==
Burden attended the University of Utah. He played for the United States men's national basketball team in the 1974 FIBA World Championship, winning the bronze medal and scoring 20.2 points per game, a Team USA record which was overtaken by Kevin Durant in 2010. In 1975, his junior year, he averaged 28.7 points per game and set the Western Athletic Conference record for field goals in a season with 359.

== Professional basketball ==
Following his junior season, he was allowed to turn pro as a hardship case. Burden was drafted by the Virginia Squires of the American Basketball Association and the New York Knicks of the National Basketball Association. He chose Virginia, but left after one season, during which he had a serious argument with coach Bill Musselman. Upon joining the Knicks, he stated "In Virginia I saw the bad side of pro basketball, in New York I know I'll see the good side". In the 1976–77 season, Burden got into 61 games for the Knicks in a backup role, averaging 10 minutes and 5.7 points per game. However, in the 77–78 season Knicks coach Willis Reed became frustrated with Burden's lack of defensive play, and sent him to the disabled list for the remainder of the season after he played in just two games. Reed unsuccessfully attempted to trade Burden, but ending up placing him on waivers and releasing him following the season.

== Later life ==
On July 3, 1980, Burden and three other men allegedly robbed a bank in Hempstead, Long Island. Burden was convicted after the three other men struck deals and testified against him, and was given a sentence of six to eighteen years. After serving two years, Burden's conviction was overturned when a court ruled that detectives did not possess search or arrest warrants when they raided Burden's home. Burden would later plead guilty to receiving stolen money in conjunction with the robbery, but was released after being given credit for time served.

From 2010 onward, Burden was working with the YWCA organization, mentoring and coaching basketball. In 2012, Burden began experiencing medical problems related to ATTR amyloidosis. He died in Winston-Salem, North Carolina on October 29, 2015, after developing a fever following cataract surgery.

== Personal life ==
Burden's grandson, Luther Burden III, is a wide receiver who played for the University of Missouri and was drafted by the Chicago Bears in the 2025 NFL draft.
