= George Irvine (basketball) =

American basketball player and coach (1948–2017)

Personal information
- Born: February 1, 1948 Seattle, Washington, U.S.
- Died: May 8, 2017 (aged 69) Seattle, Washington, U.S.
- Listed height: 6 ft 6 in (1.98 m)
- Listed weight: 200 lb (91 kg)

Career information
- High school: Ballard (Seattle, Washington)
- College: Washington (1967–1970)
- NBA draft: 1970: 8th round, 125th overall pick
- Drafted by: Seattle SuperSonics
- Playing career: 1970–1976
- Position: Small forward
- Number: 31, 20

Career history

Playing
- 1970–1975: Virginia Squires
- 1976: Denver Nuggets

Coaching
- 1977–1980: Denver Nuggets (assistant)
- 1980–1983: Indiana Pacers (assistant)
- 1984–1986, 1988–1989: Indiana Pacers
- 1991–1995: Indiana Pacers (assistant)
- 1995–1997: Golden State Warriors (assistant)
- 1999–2000: Detroit Pistons (assistant)
- 2000–2001: Detroit Pistons

Career highlights
- First-team All-Pac-8 (1970); Second-team All-Pac-8 (1969)

Career ABA statistics
- Points: 3,093 (9.5 ppg)
- Rebounds: 959 (3.0 rpg)
- Assists: 428 (1.3 apg)
- Stats at Basketball Reference

George Ramsey Irvine (February 1, 1948 – May 8, 2017) was an American professional basketball player and coach. A 6'6" forward, Irvine played collegiately at the University of Washington, where he was a first-team All-Pac-8 selection in 1970. He was selected by the Seattle SuperSonics in the 8th round of the 1970 NBA draft. However, he never played for his hometown SuperSonics, nor for any other NBA team. Instead, Irvine opted to play for the team that selected him in the American Basketball Association draft, the Virginia Squires. Irvine played for the Squires for five seasons and then played a final pro season with the Denver Nuggets during the 1975–76 season, the ABA's final season prior to the ABA-NBA merger.

Irvine would later serve as head coach for two NBA teams; the Indiana Pacers, for two stints, and the Detroit Pistons. He was inducted into the Pac-12 Basketball Hall of Honor during the 2012 Pac-12 Conference men's basketball tournament, March 10, 2012. He died on May 8, 2017, at the age of 69 of cancer.

== Head coaching record ==
Legend
Regular season	G	Games coached	W	Games won	L	Games lost	W–L %	Win–loss %
Playoffs	PG	Playoff games	PW	Playoff wins	PL	Playoff losses	PW–L %	Playoff win–loss %

Team	Year	G	W	L	W–L%	Finish	PG	PW	PL	PW–L%	Result
Indiana	1984–85	82	22	60	.268	4th in Atlantic	—	—	—	—	Missed Playoffs
Indiana	1985–86	82	26	56	.317	6th in Central	—	—	—	—	Missed Playoffs
Indiana	1988–89	20	6	14	.300	—	—	—	—	—	—
Detroit	1999–2000	24	14	10	.583	4th in Central	3	0	3	.000	Lost in First Round
Detroit	2000–01	82	32	50	.390	5th in Central	—	—	—	—	Missed Playoffs
Career		290	100	190	.345		3	0	3	.000	
