= Jack Ankerson =

American sports executive (born 1942)

Profile
- Position: Quarterback

Personal information
- Born: March 1, 1942 (age 84); Neenah, Wisconsin, U.S.

Career information
- College: Ripon (WI)
- NFL draft: 1964: 16th round, 220th overall pick

Career history

Playing
- St. Louis Cardinals (1964)*
- * Offseason or practice squad member only

Operations
- San Antonio Spurs General manager; Virginia Squires General manager

Jack Ankerson (born March 1, 1942) is an American sports executive.

A native of Neenah, Wisconsin, attended Ripon College, where he played football, tennis, and basketball, earning all-conference honors in 1963 and 1964 and ranked as one of the small school's all-time leading scorers.

He was drafted as a quarterback in the 16th round of the 1964 NFL draft by the St. Louis Cardinals. After a brief football career with the Cardinals, Ankerson worked in the front office of the Kentucky Colonels of the American Basketball Association (ABA). He was later hired as general manager of the San Antonio Spurs, where in 1974, The Sporting News named him ABA Executive of the Year.

In May 1974, Ankerson was hired as the general manager of the ABA's Virginia Squires, who would finish the 1974–75 season with a record of 15–69, the worst in the league.

Ankerson served as head coach of the Squires for two games, going 1–1, after taking over for Bill Musselman on January 21, 1976. Ankerson was replaced by Zelmo Beaty two days later.

Ankerson worked for several years as a sports and program director at WTAR radio station in Norfolk, Virginia

In 1995, at the age of 53, Ankerson joined the Norfolk Tides, then the Triple-A affiliate of the New York Mets, as the team's director of broadcasting and sales.

Since February 2000, Ankerson has served as Executive Director of the Hampton Roads Sports Commission in Virginia Beach, Virginia. He is also the "Voice of the Monarchs," the public address announcer for Old Dominion University football and men's and women's basketball games.

In 2010, he was selected for induction into the Hampton Roads Sports Hall of Fame.

== Head coaching record ==
Team	Year	G	W	L	W–L%	Finish	PG	PW	PL	PW–L%	Result
Virginia	1975–76	2	1	1	.500	(interim)	—	—	—	—	—
Career		2	1	1	.500		0	0	0	–	
