= David Vaughn Jr. =

American basketball player

David Vaughn
Personal information
- Born: June 4, 1952 (age 74) Nashville, Tennessee, U.S.
- Listed height: 6 ft 11 in (2.11 m)
- Listed weight: 220 lb (100 kg)

Career information
- High school: Cameron (Nashville, Tennessee)
- College: Oral Roberts (1972–1973)
- NBA draft: 1975: 4th round, 63rd overall pick
- Drafted by: New York Knicks
- Position: Center
- Number: 45

Career history
- 1974–1976: Virginia Squires
- Stats at Basketball Reference

David Vaughn Jr. (born June 4, 1952) is an American former professional basketball player. At 6'11", he played the center position.

Born in Nashville, Tennessee, Vaughn starred at Nashville's Cameron High School, who won state championships in 1970 and 1971. Rated the second-best basketball prospect in the country, Vaughn committed to Memphis State University in 1971, but then decided to play for Oral Roberts University after meeting with Oral Roberts himself. Incidentally, Vaughn soon married Gail Finch, who was the sister of Memphis State star Larry Finch.

As a sophomore at ORU in 1973, Vaughn scored 34 points and grabbed 34 rebounds in a game against Brandeis University, setting a still-standing school record for most rebounds in a game. He averaged 19.2 points and 14.3 rebounds that season and earned All-American honors. Later that year, however, Vaughn fell into depression due to various personal problems. Vaughn left ORU for the University of Nevada, Las Vegas shortly afterwards, but he never played basketball at UNLV. Vaughn was selected in the 1973 ABA Special Circumstances Draft by the San Diego Conqusitadors and opted to sign a professional contract, ending up with the Virginia Squires of the American Basketball Association in 1974. Vaughn played with the Squires from 1974 to 1976, averaging 10.7 points per game and 9.8 rebounds per game. When the Squires folded in 1976, Vaughn took his game to Europe, but his career ended a few years later when he broke both of his legs in an automobile accident.

Vaughn and Gail Finch had two sons Nehemia Vaughn and David Vaughn III, who later played at Memphis State University and in the NBA.

== See also ==
- List of NCAA Division I men's basketball players with 30 or more rebounds in a game
