= Mike Jackson (basketball) =

American basketball player (born 1949)

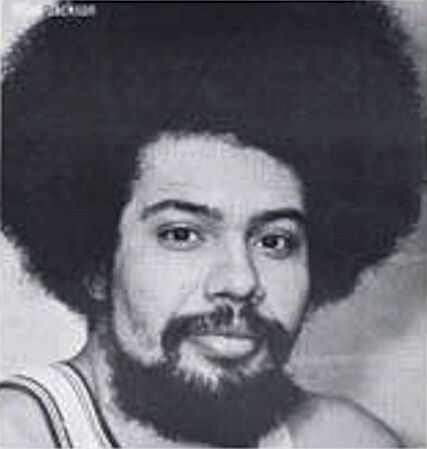
- Jackson with the Allentown Jets in 1977

Personal information
- Born: July 31, 1949 (age 77) Washington, D.C., U.S.
- Listed height: 6 ft 7 in (2.01 m)
- Listed weight: 215 lb (98 kg)

Career information
- High school: Cardozo (Washington, D.C.)
- College: Allan Hancock (1968–1970); Cal State LA (1970–1972)
- NBA draft: 1972: 7th round, 104th overall pick
- Drafted by: Houston Rockets
- Playing career: 1972–1979
- Position: Power forward
- Number: 21, 25, 31

Career history
- 1972–1974: Utah Stars
- 1974: Memphis Tams
- 1974–1976: Virginia Squires
- 1976–1979: Allentown Jets

Career highlights
- All-CBA Second Team (1979); Second-team All-PCAA (1972)
- Stats at Basketball Reference

Michael Jackson (born July 31, 1949) is an American former professional basketball player. After a collegiate career at the Cal State University Los Angeles where he was an All-Pacific Coast Athletic Association second-team selection in 1972, Jackson was selected in both the 1972 ABA draft and 1972 NBA draft.

Jackson played at Hancock Junior College (now called Allan Hancock College) to start his collegiate career. He was named a junior college All-American before enrolling at Cal State Los Angeles to play the final two years of his collegiate career.
