= Mel Bennett =

American basketball player

Personal information
- Born: January 4, 1955 (age 71) Pittsburgh, Pennsylvania
- Listed height: 6 ft 7 in (2.01 m)
- Listed weight: 200 lb (91 kg)

Career information
- High school: Peabody (Pittsburgh, Pennsylvania)
- College: Pittsburgh (1974–1975)
- NBA draft: 1975: undrafted
- Playing career: 1975–1982
- Position: Power forward
- Number: 34, 9, 33, 52

Career history
- 1975–1976: Virginia Squires
- 1976–1978: Indiana Pacers
- 1979–1980: Hawaii Volcanoes
- 1980–1981: Utah Jazz
- 1981–1982: Cleveland Cavaliers

Career ABA and NBA statistics
- Points: 1,402
- Rebounds: 952
- Assists: 204
- Stats at NBA.com
- Stats at Basketball Reference

Melvin P. Bennett (born January 4, 1955) is a retired American professional basketball player.

He played forward for the Virginia Squires (1975–76) of the American Basketball Association and the Indiana Pacers (1976–78), Utah Jazz (1980–81) and Cleveland Cavaliers (1981–82) of the National Basketball Association. Born and raised in Pittsburgh, Pennsylvania, he played at Peabody High School and the University of Pittsburgh.

Currently, he works as an aide at Ocean City Intermediate School in Ocean City, New Jersey. There, he gives students snacks as prizes for answering his trivia questions. In 2015, he was voted by the students to dress like a turkey for Thanksgiving.
