= Jimmy Dan Conner =

American basketball player

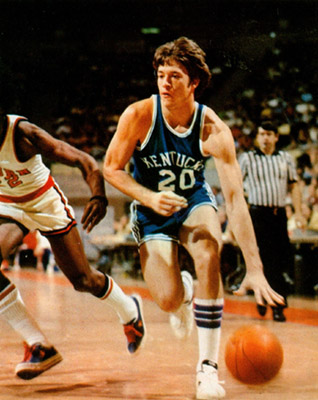
- Conner as a member of the Kentucky Wildcats

Personal information
- Born: March 20, 1953 (age 73) Lawrenceburg, Kentucky, U.S.
- Listed height: 6 ft 4 in (1.93 m)
- Listed weight: 190 lb (86 kg)

Career information
- High school: Anderson County (Lawrenceburg, Kentucky)
- College: Kentucky (1972–1975)
- NBA draft: 1975: 2nd round, 36th overall pick
- Drafted by: Phoenix Suns
- Position: Shooting guard
- Number: 21

Career history
- 1975–1976: Kentucky Colonels

Career highlights
- Fourth-team Parade All-American (1971); Kentucky Mr. Basketball (1971)
- Stats at Basketball Reference

Jimmy Dan Conner (born March 20, 1953, in Lawrenceburg, Kentucky) is an American former professional basketball shooting guard who played one season in the American Basketball Association (ABA) as a member of the Kentucky Colonels. As a high school senior in 1971, he was named Kentucky Mr. Basketball as a member of the Anderson County High School men's basketball team. He attended University of Kentucky where he was a member of the school's basketball team. He was selected in the 1975 NBA draft by the Phoenix Suns in the second round (18^{th} pick overall), but did not sign.
