= Dave Twardzik =

American basketball player

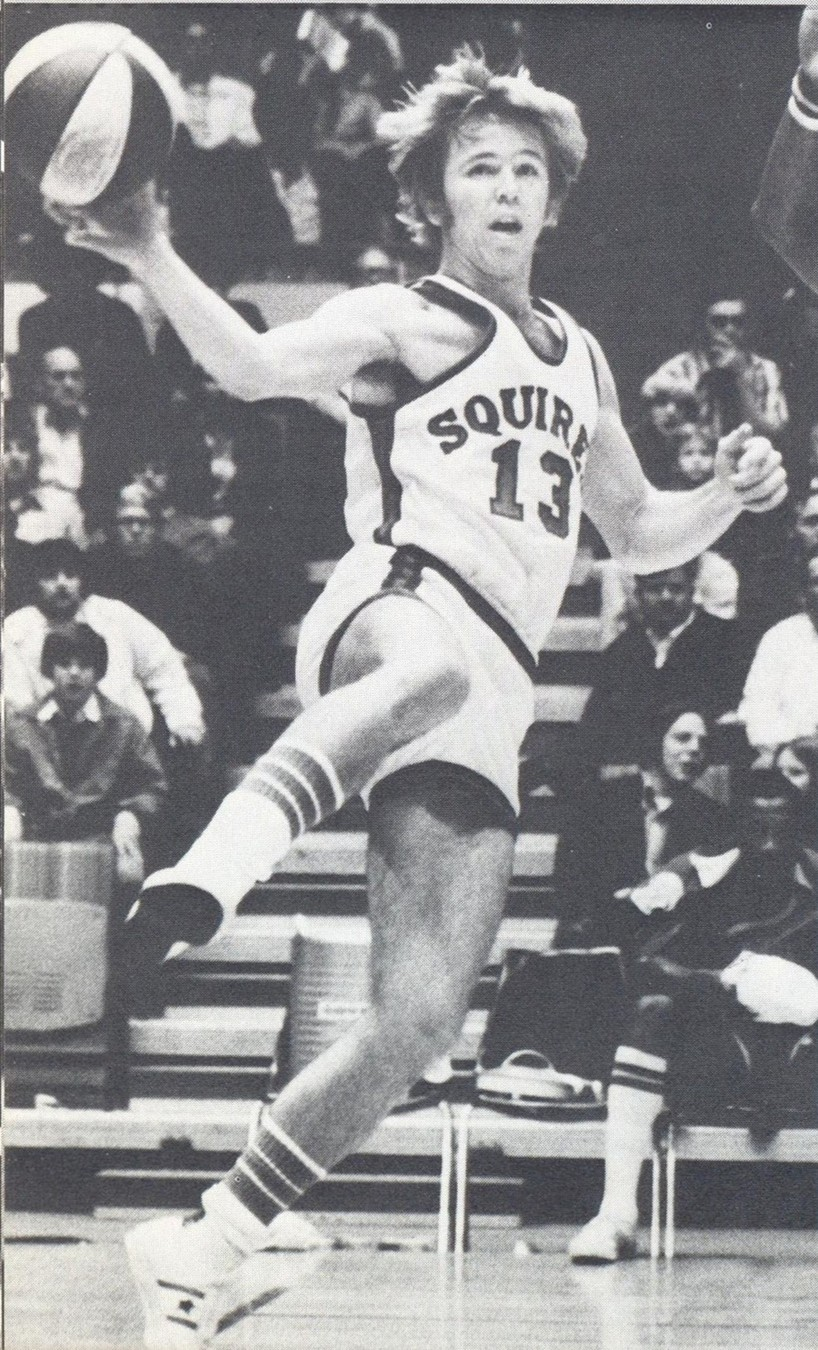

Personal information
- Born: September 20, 1950 (age 76) Hershey, Pennsylvania, U.S.
- Listed height: 6 ft 1 in (1.85 m)
- Listed weight: 175 lb (79 kg)

Career information
- High school: Middletown Area (Middletown, Pennsylvania)
- College: Old Dominion (1969–1972)
- NBA draft: 1972: 2nd round, 26th overall pick
- Drafted by: Portland Trail Blazers
- Playing career: 1972–1980
- Position: Point guard
- Number: 13

Career history
- 1972–1976: Virginia Squires
- 1976–1980: Portland Trail Blazers

Career highlights
- NBA champion (1977); ABA All-Star (1975); No. 13 retired by Portland Trail Blazers; No. 14 retired by Old Dominion Monarchs

Career ABA and NBA statistics
- Points: 4,977 (9.3 ppg)
- Rebounds: 1,286 (2.4 rpg)
- Assists: 1,823 (3.4 apg)
- Stats at NBA.com
- Stats at Basketball Reference

David John Twardzik (born September 20, 1950) is an American former professional basketball player. He was a point guard in both the American Basketball Association (ABA) and the National Basketball Association (NBA). He is best known for being a key starting guard on the Portland Trail Blazers team that won the 1977 NBA Finals.

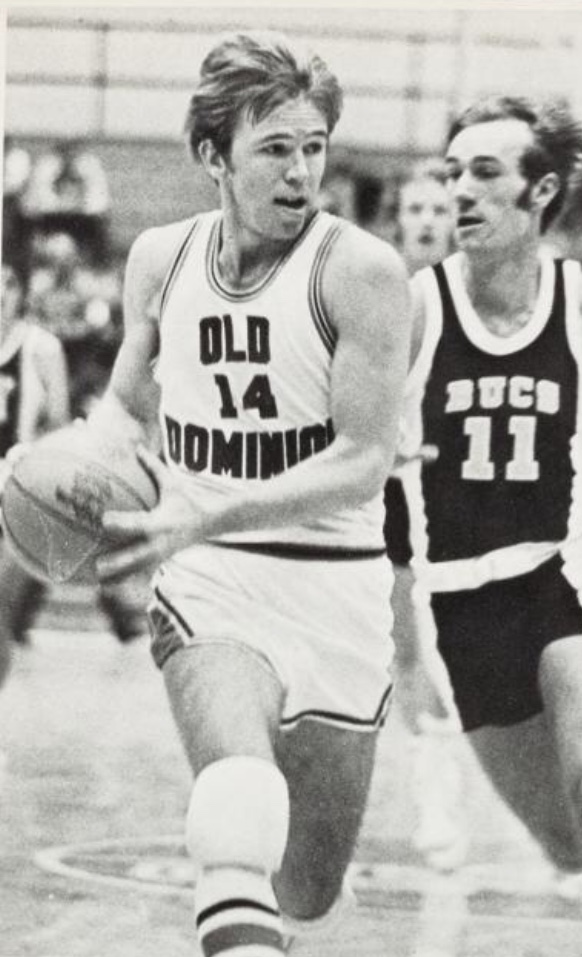
Twardzik at Old Dominion.

Twardzik grew up in Middletown, Pennsylvania, and played collegiately at Old Dominion University, where he was a two-time All-American and led the Monarchs to the 1971 NCAA Division II title game. He was drafted by the Trail Blazers in 1972, but elected to play for the Virginia Squires of the ABA. Twardzik played for the Squires for four seasons until the team (and the ABA) came to an end, folding just prior to the ABA-NBA merger in June 1976. After the ABA-NBA merger Twardzik signed with the Blazers as a free agent. He would be the starting two-guard of the Blazers team which won the NBA title in 1977. He played for four seasons total in Portland, and retired at the end of the 1979–80 season because of injury. His jersey number (13) was retired by the team on October 11, 1981.

After his retirement from playing, he began an NBA coaching and front-office career. He served in Portland's front office through 1985, and worked as an assistant coach for the Indiana Pacers from 1986 through 1989. Twardzik was the General Manager of the Golden State Warriors from May 10, 1995, to June 5, 1997. He was hired to rebuild the team but is often remembered for drafting Todd Fuller with the 11th pick in the 1996 NBA Draft, two spots ahead of Kobe Bryant. He was fired in 1997 following two losing seasons. He has also worked for the Detroit Pistons, Charlotte Hornets, Los Angeles Clippers, and the Denver Nuggets. In 2003, he became Director of Player Personnel for the Orlando Magic, and was promoted to assistant general manager in 2005. He held that position until 2012. Since the 2013-14 basketball season, Twardzik has been a color commentator for radio broadcasts of Old Dominion's men's basketball games.

In 1995, Twardzik was inducted into the Virginia Sports Hall of Fame.
