= Robert J. Wickenheiser =

Robert J. Wickenheiser (December 13, 1942 - November 23, 2015) served as president of Mount St. Mary's College in Maryland from 1977 to 1993 and of St. Bonaventure University in New York from 1994 to 2003. The Maryland State Senate recognized his "exemplary leadership" of Mount St. Mary's when he retired. The first layman to hold the position at St. Bonaventure, he oversaw the university as it implemented a new core curriculum and expanded its University of Ministries, among other achievements before resigning his position during a scandal over the acceptance of an ineligible basketball player. An avid collector of the works of 17th century poet John Milton for decades, Wickenheiser sold his collection to the University of South Carolina in 2006, helping it establish what was declared at that time to be among the largest collections of Milton in the world.

== Early life and education ==
A North Dakota native, Wickenheiser was born in Bismarck on 13 December 1942 and grew up in Strasburg. Wickenheiser was a Benedictine monk for four years, having entered a monastery in 1962. He attended St. Benedict's College in Atchison, Kansas, where he graduated summa cum laude with a bachelor's degree in philosophy in 1965, and the University of Minnesota, where he earned a doctoral degree in English Literature. He attended the Assumption School of Theology and the Shakespeare Institute in England for a year.

== Career ==
After serving as an English teacher at Princeton University, Wickenheiser was named 21st president of Mount St. Mary's College near Emmitsburg, Maryland in 1977. Following his announced intent to retire in 1993, he was celebrated by the Maryland State Senate, who passed a resolution to recognize "his exemplary leadership" of the college. The last year of his tenure had been marked by controversies which Wickenheiser indicated arose from "firm and difficult actions [that] had to be taken to place the Mount clearly on track with its mission".

Brought aboard as the 19th president of St. Bonaventure University in 1994, Wickenheiser was in tenure at the university in 1998 when it introduced its new core curriculum. He resigned from the university in 2003 after acknowledging that he had ordered subordinates to allow an ineligible student entry to the school so he could play basketball.

== Collecting ==
Wickenheiser began collecting works related to John Milton in the late 1960s, amassing over 6,000 volumes of books about the poet which he sold to the University of South Carolina in Columbia in 2006 for one million dollars. According to the university, Wickenheiser and his wife desired to keep the collection together in one library and so accepted a conservative valuation for the sale. The Robert J. Wickenheiser Collection is housed in the William L. Richter Room, named for the philanthropist who provided the bulk of the funds. At the time of the sale, the Associated Press noted that the influx of manuscripts made the Milton collection at USC "among the largest in the world".
