= List of All-SEC men's basketball teams =

The All-SEC men's basketball team is an annual Southeastern Conference honor bestowed on the best players in the conference following every college basketball season. SEC coaches select a five-player first team, a five-player second team, and a five-player third team.

== Selections ==
*	Named SEC Player of the Year that season. Awarded since 1965.
†	Named co-SEC Players of the Year that season.

=== 1948–1949 ===
Season	First team		Second team		Third team		Ref
Season	Players	Team	Players	Team	Players	Team	Ref
1948–49	Alex Groza	Kentucky	Billy Joe Adcock	Vanderbilt	Bob Healey	Georgia	
1948–49	Paul Walther	Tennessee	Cliff Barker	Kentucky	Colin Anderson	Georgia Tech	
1948–49	Ralph Beard	Kentucky	Hugh Jones	Tennessee	Dale Barnstable	Kentucky	
1948–49	Virgil Risner	Tulane	Jim Nolan	Georgia Tech	Joe Jordan	Georgia	
1948–49	Wallace Jones	Kentucky	Jim Riffey	Tulane	Warren Perkins	Tulane	

=== 1950–1959 ===
Season	First team		Second team		Third team		Ref
Season	Player	Team	Player	Team	Player	Team	Ref
1949–50	Bill Spivey	Kentucky	Bob Schloss	Georgia	Art Burris	Tennessee	
1949–50	Billy Joe Adcock	Vanderbilt	Dan Lanford	Auburn	Bill Lynn	Auburn	
1949–50	Colin Anderson	Georgia Tech	Herb Hargett	Mississippi State	Bob Healey	Georgia	
1949–50	Jim Line	Kentucky	Mel Payton	Tulane	Bob Meador	LSU	
1949–50	Jim Riffey	Tulane	Walter Hirsch	Kentucky	Dick McKenzie	Alabama	
1949–50	N/A	N/A	N/A	N/A	Hans Tanzler	Florida	
1950–51	Bill Spivey	Kentucky	Herb Hargett	Mississippi State	Bob Garrison	Tennessee	
1950–51	Bobby Watson	Kentucky	Joe Dean	LSU	Bob Schloss	Georgia	
1950–51	Dave Kardokus	Vanderbilt	Joe Jordan	Georgia	Bob Schneider	Alabama	
1950–51	Frank Ramsey	Kentucky	Paul Sullivan	Alabama	Dan Lanford	Auburn	
1950–51	Mel Payton	Tulane	Shelby Linville	Kentucky	Harry Hamilton	Florida	
1950–51	N/A	N/A	N/A	N/A	Pete Silas	Georgia Tech	
1951–52	Bob Pettit	LSU	Coyte Vance	Mississippi State	N/A	N/A	
1951–52	Bobby Watson	Kentucky	Dave Kardokus	Vanderbilt	N/A	N/A	
1951–52	Cliff Hagan	Kentucky	Don Holt	Tulane	N/A	N/A	
1951–52	Frank Ramsey	Kentucky	Paul Sullivan	Alabama	N/A	N/A	
1951–52	Joe Dean	LSU	Rick Casares	Florida	N/A	N/A	
1952–53	Bob Pettit	LSU	Benny McArdle	LSU	N/A	N/A	
1952–53	Cob Jarvis	Mississippi	Dan Finch	Vanderbilt	N/A	N/A	
1952–53	Curt Cunkle	Florida	Gerald Caveness	Mississippi State	N/A	N/A	
1952–53	Pete Silas	Georgia Tech	Jerry Harper	Alabama	N/A	N/A	
1952–53	Zippy Morocco	Georgia	Rick Casares	Florida	N/A	N/A	
1953–54	Bob Pettit	LSU	Carl Widseth	Tennessee	Benny McArdle	LSU	
1953–54	Cliff Hagan	Kentucky	Denver Brackeen	Mississippi	Gerald Caveness	Mississippi State	
1953–54	Cob Jarvis	Mississippi	Ed Wiener	Tennessee	Jerry Harper	Alabama	
1953–54	Dan Finch	Vanderbilt	Hal Cervini	Tulane	Leon Marlaire	Alabama	
1953–54	Frank Ramsey	Kentucky	Lou Tsioropoulos	Kentucky	Robert Miller	Auburn	
1954–55	Bob Burrow	Kentucky	Bill Kirkpatrick	Auburn	Al Rochelle	Vanderbilt	
1954–55	Carl Widseth	Tennessee	Bob Emrick	Florida	Bill Evans	Kentucky	
1954–55	Denver Brackeen	Mississippi	George Linn	Alabama	Joe Helms	Georgia Tech	
1954–55	Ed Wiener	Tennessee	Hal Cervini	Tulane	Murphy McManus	Georgia	
1954–55	Jerry Harper	Alabama	Jim Ashmore	Mississippi State	Sonny Powell	Florida	

Season	First team		Second team		Third team		Ref
Season	Player	Team	Player	Team	Player	Team	Ref
1955–56	Bob Burrow	Kentucky	Al Rochelle	Vanderbilt	Bob Emrick	Florida	
1955–56	George Linn	Alabama	Babe Taylor	Vanderbilt	Bobby Kimmel	Georgia Tech	
1955–56	Jerry Harper	Alabama	Carl Widseth	Tennessee	Bobby Thym	Vanderbilt	
1955–56	Jim Ashmore	Mississippi State	Jerry Bird	Kentucky	Herman Thompson	Tennessee	
1955–56	Roger Sigler	LSU	Joe Gibbon	Mississippi	Jim O'Donnell	Auburn	
1956–57	Al Rochelle	Vanderbilt	Bobby Thym	Vanderbilt	Bobby Kimmel	Georgia Tech	
1956–57	Bailey Howell	Mississippi State	Calvin Grosscup	Tulane	Herman Thompson	Tennessee	
1956–57	Jim Ashmore	Mississippi State	Ed Beck	Kentucky	Jim Fulmer	Alabama	
1956–57	Joe Gibbon	Mississippi	Jack Kubiszyn	Alabama	Rex Frederick	Auburn	
1956–57	Johnny Cox	Kentucky	Joe Hubbs	Florida	Roger Sigler	LSU	
1957–58	Bailey Howell	Mississippi State	Jim Henry	Vanderbilt	Carlton Garner	Mississippi	
1957–58	Bumper Tormohlen	Tennessee	Johnny Cox	Kentucky	Dave Denton	Georgia Tech	
1957–58	Jack Kubiszyn	Donald Trumpbjig	Ray Blemker	Georgia Tech	Jim Fulmer	Alabama	
1957–58	Joe Hobbs	Florida	Terry Randall	Georgia Tech	Jimmy Lee	Auburn	
1957–58	Rex Frederick	Auburn	Vernon Hatton	Kentucky	John Crigler	Kentucky	
1958–59	Bailey Howell	Mississippi State	Gary Stoll	Tulane	Bill Lickert	Kentucky	
1958–59	Bumper Tormohlen	Tennessee	Henry Hart	Auburn	Dalen Showalter	Tennessee	
1958–59	Jim Henry	Vanderbilt	Jimmy Lee	Auburn	Jack Waters	Mississippi	
1958–59	Johnny Cox	Kentucky	Ray Blemker	Georgia Tech	Kenny Coulter	Tennessee	
1958–59	Rex Frederick	Auburn	Terry Randall	Georgia Tech	Vic Klinker	Tulane	

=== 1960–1969 ===
Season	First team		Second team		Third team		Ref
Season	Player	Team	Player	Team	Player	Team	Ref
1959–60	Dalen Showalter	Tennessee	Bill Lickert	Kentucky	Ben Rowan	Vanderbilt	
1959–60	Dave Denton	Georgia Tech	Don Mills	Kentucky	Charles Hull	Mississippi State	
1959–60	Henry Hart	Auburn	Jack Ardon	Tulane	David Vaughn	Auburn	
1959–60	Jack Waters	Mississippi	Jerry Graves	Mississippi State	Ivan Richmann	Mississippi	
1959–60	Roger Kaiser	Georgia Tech	Vic Klinker	Tulane	Phillip Simpson	Georgia	
1960–61	Bill Depp	Vanderbilt	Jack Ardon	Tulane	Don Ringstaff	Vanderbilt	
1960–61	Bill Lickert	Kentucky	Jim Kerwin	Tulane	Henry Hoskins	Alabama	
1960–61	George Nattin	LSU	Jimmy Fibbe	Auburn	Jack Waters	Mississippi	
1960–61	Jerry Graves	Mississippi State	Lou Merchant	Florida	Larry Pennington	Alabama	
1960–61	Roger Kaiser	Georgia Tech	Phillip Simpson	Georgia	Red Stroud	Mississippi State	
1961–62	Cotton Nash	Kentucky	Allan Johnson	Georgia	Billy Tinker	Auburn	
1961–62	Jim Kerwin	Tulane	Clifford Luyk	Florida	Carroll Burchett	Kentucky	
1961–62	Larry Pursiful	Kentucky	Don Kessinger	Mississippi	George Nattin	LSU	
1961–62	Leland Mitchell	Mississippi State	John Russell	Vanderbilt	Jack Ardon	Tulane	
1961–62	Red Stroud	Mississippi State	Layton Johns	Auburn	Maury Drummond	LSU	
1962–63	Cotton Nash	Kentucky	Danny Schultz	Tennessee	Bob Andrews	Alabama	
1962–63	Don Kessinger	Mississippi	Ellis Cooper	LSU	Joe Dan Gold	Mississippi State	
1962–63	Layton Johns	Auburn	Jim Caldwell	Georgia Tech	John Blackwell	Auburn	
1962–63	Leland Mitchell	Mississippi State	Jim Kerwin	Tulane	Mike Tomasovich	Georgia Tech	
1962–63	Red Stroud	Mississippi State	John Russell	Vanderbilt	Tom Baxley	Florida	
1963–64	Clyde Lee	Vanderbilt	A. W. Davis	Tennessee	Doug Hutton	Mississippi State	
1963–64	Cotton Nash	Kentucky	Brooks Henderson	Florida	Jerry Waller	Georgia	
1963–64	Danny Schultz	Tennessee	Jim Caldwell	Georgia Tech	Jimmy Pitts	Georgia	
1963–64	Dick Maile	LSU	John Ed Miller	Vanderbilt	Larry Conley	Kentucky	
1963–64	Don Kessinger	Mississippi	Robert Craddock	Georgia Tech	Lee DeFore	Auburn	
1963–64	N/A	N/A	Ted Deeken	Kentucky	N/A	N/A	
1964–65	A. W. Davis	Tennessee	Al Andrews	Tulane	Brooks Henderson	Florida	
1964–65	Bob Andrews	Alabama	Bob Grace	Vanderbilt	Freddie Guy	Auburn	
1964–65	Clyde Lee*	Vanderbilt	John Ed Miller	Vanderbilt	Howard Bayne	Tennessee	
1964–65	Dick Maile	LSU	Louie Dampier	Kentucky	Tommy Kron	Kentucky	
1964–65	Joe Newton	Auburn	Ron Widby	Tennessee	Jimmy Pitts	Georgia	
1965–66	Clyde Lee†	Vanderbilt	Al Andrews	Tulane	Jerry Waller	Georgia	
1965–66	Keith Thomas	Vanderbilt	Austin Robbins	Tennessee	Larry Conley	Kentucky	
1965–66	Lee DeFore	Auburn	Dave Williams	Mississippi State	Mike Nordholz	Alabama	
1965–66	Louie Dampier	Kentucky	Gary Keller	Florida	Tommy Kron	Kentucky	
1965–66	Pat Riley†	Kentucky	Ron Widby	Tennessee	N/A	N/A	
1965–66	N/A	N/A	Thad Jaracz	Kentucky	N/A	N/A	
1966–67	Louie Dampier	Kentucky	Bo Wyenandt	Vanderbilt	Alex Howell	Auburn	
1966–67	Mike Nordholz	Alabama	Dave Williams	Mississippi State	Bill Justus	Tennessee	
1966–67	Ron Widby*	Tennessee	Gary Keller	Florida	Bob Warren	Vanderbilt	
1966–67	Tom Boerwinkle	Tennessee	Jerry Southwood	Vanderbilt	Jim Youngblood	Georgia	
1966–67	Tom Hagan	Vanderbilt	Pat Riley	Kentucky	N/A	N/A	
1966–67	N/A	N/A	Skip Highley	Florida	N/A	N/A	
1967–68	Mike Casey	Kentucky	Bill Justus	Tennessee	Bob Warren	Vanderbilt	
1967–68	Neal Walk	Florida	Bo Wyenandt	Vanderbilt	Ray Jeffords	Georgia	
1967–68	Pete Maravich*	LSU	Bob Lienhard	Georgia	Thad Jaracz	Kentucky	
1967–68	Tom Boerwinkle	Tennessee	Dan Issel	Kentucky	Wally Tinker	Auburn	
1967–68	Tom Hagan	Vanderbilt	Mike Nordholz	Alabama	N/A	N/A	
1967–68	N/A	N/A	Tom Payne	Mississippi State	N/A	N/A	
1968–69	Bill Justus	Tennessee	Bob Lienhard	Georgia	Andrew Owens	Florida	
1968–69	Dan Issel	Kentucky	Jerry Epling	Georgia	Bill Hann	Tennessee	
1968–69	Neal Walk	Florida	John Mengelt	Auburn	Bobby Croft	Tennessee	
1968–69	Pete Maravich*	LSU	Mike Casey	Kentucky	Gary Elliott	Alabama	
1968–69	Tom Hagan	Vanderbilt	Mike Pratt	Kentucky	Ken Turner	Mississippi	
1968–69	N/A	N/A	N/A	N/A	Wally Tinker	Auburn	

=== 1970–1979 ===
Season	First team		Second team		Third team		Ref
Season	Player	Team	Player	Team	Player	Team	Ref
1969–70	Andrew Owens	Florida	Bobby Croft	Tennessee	N/A	N/A	
1969–70	Bob Lienhard	Georgia	Jim England	Tennessee	N/A	N/A	
1969–70	Dan Issel	Kentucky	Lanny Taylor	Georgia	N/A	N/A	
1969–70	John Mengelt	Auburn	Perry Wallace	Vanderbilt	N/A	N/A	
1969–70	Mike Pratt	Kentucky	Ron Coleman	Mississippi	N/A	N/A	
1969–70	Pete Maravich*	LSU	N/A	N/A	N/A	N/A	
1970–71	Al Sanders	LSU	Don Johnson	Tennessee	N/A	N/A	
1970–71	Jim England	Tennessee	Jack Bouldin	Mississippi State	N/A	N/A	
1970–71	John Mengelt	Auburn	Larry Steele	Kentucky	N/A	N/A	
1970–71	Johnny Neumann*	Mississippi	Mike Casey	Kentucky	N/A	N/A	
1970–71	Tom Payne	Kentucky	Thorpe Weber	Vanderbilt	N/A	N/A	
1970–71	N/A	N/A	Tom Parker	Kentucky	N/A	N/A	
1971–72	Len Kosmalski	Tennessee	Al Sanders	LSU	Alan House	Alabama	
1971–72	Mike Edwards†	Tennessee	Coolidge Ball	Mississippi	Bill Newton	LSU	
1971–72	Tom Parker†	Kentucky	Jim Andrews	Kentucky	Henry Harris	Auburn	
1971–72	Tony Miller	Florida	John Fraley	Georgia	Ray Odums	Alabama	
1971–72	Wendell Hudson	Alabama	Ronnie Hogue	Georgia	Ronnie Lyons	Kentucky	
1972–73	Jim Andrews	Kentucky	Charles Cleveland	Alabama	Gary England	Auburn	
1972–73	Kevin Grevey†	Kentucky	Chip Williams	Florida	Jimmy Dan Conner	Kentucky	
1972–73	Mike Edwards	Tennessee	Coolidge Ball	Mississippi	Steve Turner	Vanderbilt	
1972–73	Terry Compton	Vanderbilt	Ed Palubinskas	LSU	Larry Robinson	Tennessee	
1972–73	Wendell Hudson†	Alabama	Len Kosmalski	Tennessee	Ray Odums	Alabama	
1972–73	N/A	N/A	Tim Bassett	Georgia	Rich Knarr	Mississippi State	
1973–74	Charles Cleveland	Alabama	Eddie Johnson	Auburn	Ray Odums	Alabama	
1973–74	Chip Williams	Florida	Glenn Hansen	LSU	Len Kosmalski	Tennessee	
1973–74	Ernie Grunfeld	Tennessee	Jeff Fosnes	Vanderbilt	Ed Palubinskas	LSU	
1973–74	Jan van Breda Kolff*	Vanderbilt	Leon Douglas	Alabama	Jerry Jenkins	Mississippi State	
1973–74	Kevin Grevey	Kentucky	Terry Compton	Vanderbilt	John Snow	Tennessee	
1974–75	Bernard King†	Tennessee	Eddie Johnson	Auburn	Rick Robey	Kentucky	
1974–75	Charles Cleveland	Alabama	Glenn Hansen	LSU	Chip Williams	Florida	
1974–75	Ernie Grunfeld	Tennessee	Jacky Dorsey	Georgia	Dave Shepherd	Mississippi	
1974–75	Kevin Grevey†	Kentucky	Jeff Fosnes	Vanderbilt	Gene Shy	Florida	
1974–75	Leon Douglas	Alabama	Jerry Jenkins	Mississippi State	Jimmy Dan Conner	Kentucky	
1974–75	N/A	N/A	N/A	N/A	Mike Mitchell	Auburn	
1975–76	Bernard King*	Tennessee	Jack Givens	Kentucky	Anthony Murray	Alabama	
1975–76	Eddie Johnson	Auburn	Jeff Fosnes	Vanderbilt	Bob Smyth	Florida	
1975–76	Ernie Grunfeld	Tennessee	Kenny Higgs	LSU	Butch Feher	Vanderbilt	
1975–76	Jacky Dorsey	Georgia	Mike Mitchell	Auburn	Gene Shy	Florida	
1975–76	Leon Douglas	Alabama	Mike Phillips	Kentucky	Mike Jackson	Tennessee	
1975–76	N/A	N/A	N/A	N/A	Ray White	Mississippi State	
1975–76	N/A	N/A	N/A	N/A	Walter Daniels	Georgia	
1976–77	Bernard King†	Tennessee	Bob Smyth	Florida	Rudy Macklin	LSU	
1976–77	Ernie Grunfeld†	Tennessee	Kenny Higgs	LSU	Eddie Johnson	Auburn	
1976–77	Jack Givens	Kentucky	Mike Mitchell	Auburn	John Billips	Mississippi	
1976–77	Reggie King	Alabama	Rickey Brown	Mississippi State	Johnny Darden	Tennessee	
1976–77	Rick Robey	Kentucky	T. R. Dunn	Alabama	Larry Johnson	Kentucky	
1976–77	N/A	N/A	N/A	N/A	Mike Jackson	Tennessee	
1976–77	N/A	N/A	N/A	N/A	Ricky Brown	Alabama	
1977–78	Jack Givens	Kentucky	Wiley Peck	Mississippi State	Anthony Murray	Alabama	
1977–78	Kyle Macy	Kentucky	Ray White	Mississippi State	Rickey Brown	Mississippi State	
1977–78	Mike Mitchell	Auburn	Reggie Johnson	Tennessee	DeWayne Scales	LSU	
1977–78	Reggie King*	Alabama	Stan Pietkiewicz	Auburn	James Lee	Kentucky	
1977–78	Rick Robey	Kentucky	Walter Daniels	Georgia	Mike Rhodes	Vanderbilt	
1977–78	Rudy Macklin	LSU	N/A	N/A	N/A	N/A	
1978–79	Al Green	LSU	Charles Davis	Vanderbilt	Terry Crosby	Tennessee	
1978–79	DeWayne Scales	LSU	Ray White	Mississippi State	Dwight Anderson	Kentucky	
1978–79	John Stroud	Mississippi	Tommy Springer	Vanderbilt	Greg Grim	Mississippi State	
1978–79	Kyle Macy	Kentucky	Walter Daniels	Georgia	LaVon Mercer	Georgia	
1978–79	Reggie Johnson	Tennessee	Wiley Peck	Mississippi State	Lionel Green	LSU	
1978–79	Reggie King*	Alabama	N/A	N/A	N/A	N/A	

=== 1980–1989 ===
Season	First team		Second team		Third team		Ref
Season	Player	Team	Player	Team	Player	Team	Ref
1979–80	John Stroud	Mississippi	DeWayne Scales	LSU	Robert Scott	Alabama	
1979–80	Kyle Macy*	Kentucky	Eddie Phillips	Alabama	Elston Turner	Mississippi	
1979–80	Reggie Johnson	Tennessee	Ethan Martin	LSU	LaVon Mercer	Georgia	
1979–80	Rickey Brown	Mississippi State	Sam Bowie	Kentucky	Mike Rhodes	Vanderbilt	
1979–80	Rudy Macklin	LSU	Sean Tuohy	Mississippi	Reggie Hannah	Florida	
1980–81	Dominique Wilkins	Georgia	Dale Ellis	Tennessee	Vernon Delancy	Florida	
1980–81	Elston Turner	Mississippi	Eddie Phillips	Alabama	Dirk Minniefield	Kentucky	
1980–81	Ethan Martin	LSU	Gary Carter	Tennessee	Howard Wood	Tennessee	
1980–81	Rudy Macklin*	LSU	Howard Carter	LSU	Ronnie Williams	Florida	
1980–81	Sam Bowie	Kentucky	Jeff Malone	Mississippi State	Sean Tuohy	Mississippi	
1981–82	Carlos Clark	Mississippi	Charles Barkley	Auburn	Ennis Whatley	Alabama	
1981–82	Dale Ellis*	Tennessee	Dirk Minniefield	Kentucky	Sean Tuohy	Mississippi	
1981–82	Derrick Hord	Kentucky	Eddie Phillips	Alabama	Michael Brooks	Tennessee	
1981–82	Dominique Wilkins	Georgia	Jeff Malone	Mississippi State	Hutch Jones	Vanderbilt	
1981–82	Howard Carter	LSU	Leonard Mitchell	LSU	Odell Mosteller	Auburn	
1981–82	N/A	N/A	Ronnie Williams	Florida	N/A	N/A	
1982–83	Carlos Clark	Mississippi	Charles Barkley	Auburn	Bobby Lee Hurt	Alabama	
1982–83	Dale Ellis†	Tennessee	Howard Carter	LSU	Darrell Lockhart	Auburn	
1982–83	Ennis Whatley	Alabama	Phil Cox	Vanderbilt	Roger Stieg	Mississippi	
1982–83	Jeff Malone†	Mississippi State	Ronnie Williams	Florida	Eugene McDowell	Florida	
1982–83	Melvin Turpin	Kentucky	Vern Fleming	Georgia	Jim Master	Kentucky	
1982–83	N/A	N/A	N/A	N/A	Kenny Walker	Kentucky	
1982–83	N/A	N/A	N/A	N/A	Leonard Mitchell	LSU	
1983–84	Charles Barkley*	Auburn	Bobby Lee Hurt	Alabama	Sam Bowie	Kentucky	
1983–84	Chuck Person	Auburn	Buck Johnson	Alabama	Eric Laird	Mississippi	
1983–84	Jeff Turner	Vanderbilt	Jerry Reynolds	LSU	Eric Richardson	Alabama	
1983–84	Melvin Turpin	Kentucky	Kenny Walker	Kentucky	Eugene McDowell	Florida	
1983–84	Vern Fleming	Georgia	Ronnie Williams	Florida	Phil Cox	Vanderbilt	
1984–85	Chuck Person	Auburn	Andrew Moten	Florida	Eric Laird	Mississippi	
1984–85	Eugene McDowell	Florida	Bobby Lee Hurt	Alabama	Jerry Reynolds	LSU	
1984–85	Kenny Walker*	Kentucky	Buck Johnson	Alabama	John Williams	LSU	
1984–85	Michael Brooks	Tennessee	Cedric Henderson	Georgia	Ken Harvey	Mississippi State	
1984–85	Phil Cox	Vanderbilt	Nikita Wilson	LSU	Terry Coner	Alabama	
1984–85	N/A	N/A	N/A	N/A	Tony White	Tennessee	
1985–86	Buck Johnson	Alabama	Andrew Moten	Florida	Terry Coner	Alabama	
1985–86	Chuck Person	Auburn	Derrick McKey	Alabama	Derrick Taylor	LSU	
1985–86	John Williams	LSU	Joe Ward	Georgia	Donald Hartry	Georgia	
1985–86	Kenny Walker*	Kentucky	Vernon Maxwell	Florida	Eric Smith	Mississippi	
1985–86	Tony White	Tennessee	Winston Bennett	Kentucky	Roger Harden	Kentucky	
1986–87	Derrick McKey†	Alabama	Andrew Moten	Florida	Nikita Wilson	LSU	
1986–87	Terry Coner	Alabama	Chris Morris	Auburn	Dyron Nix	Tennessee	
1986–87	Tony White†	Tennessee	Jeff Moore	Auburn	Ed Davender	Kentucky	
1986–87	Vernon Maxwell	Florida	Rex Chapman	Kentucky	Frank Ford	Auburn	
1986–87	Willie Anderson	Georgia	Will Perdue	Vanderbilt	Jim Farmer	Alabama	
1987–88	Chris Morris	Auburn	Michael Ansley	Alabama	Barry Goheen	Vanderbilt	
1987–88	Dyron Nix	Tennessee	Ricky Blanton	LSU	Charles Prater	Mississippi	
1987–88	Rex Chapman	Kentucky	Rod Barnes	Mississippi	Dwayne Schintzius	Florida	
1987–88	Vernon Maxwell	Florida	Willie Anderson	Georgia	Ed Davender	Kentucky	
1987–88	Will Perdue*	Vanderbilt	Winston Bennett	Kentucky	José Vargas	LSU	
1988–89	Dwayne Schintzius	Florida	Alec Kessler	Georgia	Cameron Burns	Mississippi State	
1988–89	Gerald Glass	Mississippi	Barry Goheen	Vanderbilt	Chris Mills	Kentucky	
1988–89	Mahmoud Abdul-Rauf*	LSU	Dyron Nix	Tennessee	Livingston Chatman	Florida	
1988–89	Michael Ansley	Alabama	Frank Kornet	Vanderbilt	Clifford Lett	Florida	
1988–89	Ricky Blanton	LSU	Keenan Carpenter	Auburn	Dwayne Davis	Florida	
1988–89	N/A	N/A	LeRon Ellis	Kentucky	N/A	N/A	

=== 1990–1999 ===
Season	First team		Second team		Third team		Ref
Season	Player	Team	Player	Team	Player	Team	Ref
1989–90	Alec Kessler	Georgia	Cameron Burns	Mississippi State	Dwayne Davis	Florida	
1989–90	Allan Houston	Tennessee	Derrick Miller	Kentucky	Ian Lockhart	Tennessee	
1989–90	Gerald Glass	Tennessee	Litterial Green	Georgia	Greg Bell	Tennessee	
1989–90	Mahmoud Abdul-Rauf*	LSU	Melvin Cheatum	Alabama	Ronnie Battle	Auburn	
1989–90	Shaquille O'Neal	LSU	Reggie Hanson	Kentucky	Greg Carter	Mississippi State	
1989–90	N/A	N/A	N/A	N/A	Rod Cole	Georgia	
1989–90	N/A	N/A	N/A	N/A	Stanley Roberts	LSU	
1989–90	N/A	N/A	N/A	N/A	Robert Horry	Alabama	
1990–91	Allan Houston	Tennessee	Dwayne Davis	Florida	Jamal Mashburn	Kentucky	
1990–91	Cameron Burns	Mississippi State	Gary Waites	Alabama	James Robinson	Alabama	
1990–91	Greg Carter	Mississippi State	John Pelphrey	Kentucky	Joe Harvell	Mississippi	
1990–91	Litterial Green	Georgia	Melvin Cheatum	Alabama	Kevin Anglin	Vanderbilt	
1990–91	Shaquille O'Neal*	LSU	Reggie Hanson	Kentucky	Scott Draud	Vanderbilt	
1990–91	N/A	N/A	Ronnie Battle	Auburn	Vernel Singleton	LSU	
1991–92	Allan Houston	Tennessee	Latrell Sprewell	Alabama	Chuck Evans	Mississippi State	
1991–92	Jamal Mashburn	Kentucky	Litterial Green	Georgia	James Robinson	Alabama	
1991–92	Joe Harvell	Mississippi	Robert Horry	Alabama	Oliver Miller	Arkansas	
1991–92	Lee Mayberry	Arkansas	Stacey Poole	Florida	Reggie Tinch	Georgia	
1991–92	Shaquille O'Neal*	LSU	Tony Watts	Mississippi State	Vernel Singleton	LSU	
1991–92	Todd Day	Arkansas	N/A	N/A	Wesley Person	Auburn	
1992–93	Allan Houston	Tennessee	Chuck Evans	Mississippi State	Aaron Swinson	Auburn	
1992–93	Billy McCaffrey†	Vanderbilt	Joe Harvell	Mississippi	Bruce Elder	Vanderbilt	
1992–93	Geert Hammink	LSU	Scotty Thurman	Arkansas	Corey Allen	Tennessee	
1992–93	Jamal Mashburn†	Kentucky	Travis Ford	Kentucky	Darrell Hawkins	Arkansas	
1992–93	James Robinson	Alabama	Wesley Person	Auburn	Emmett Hall	South Carolina	
1992–93	Stacey Poole	Florida	N/A	N/A	Jason Caffey	Alabama	
1992–93	N/A	N/A	N/A	N/A	Kevin Anglin	Vanderbilt	
1993–94	Billy McCaffrey	Vanderbilt	Aaron Swinson	Auburn	Tony Delk	Kentucky	
1993–94	Corliss Williamson*	Arkansas	Craig Brown	Florida	Antonio McDyess	Alabama	
1993–94	Dan Cross	Florida	Erick Dampier	Mississippi State	Darryl Wilson	Mississippi State	
1993–94	Scotty Thurman	Arkansas	Jamie Watson	South Carolina	Rodrick Rhodes	Kentucky	
1993–94	Wesley Person	Auburn	Travis Ford	Kentucky	Jamie Brandon	LSU	
1993–94	N/A	N/A	N/A	N/A	Ronnie McMahan	Vanderbilt	
1994–95	Corliss Williamson*	Arkansas	Antonio McDyess	Alabama	Andrew DeClercq	Florida	
1994–95	Dan Cross	Florida	Darryl Wilson	Mississippi State	Carlos Strong	Georgia	
1994–95	Erick Dampier	Mississippi State	Ronnie Henderson	LSU	Clint McDaniel	Arkansas	
1994–95	Scotty Thurman	Arkansas	Steve Hamer	Tennessee	Corey Beck	Arkansas	
1994–95	Tony Delk	Kentucky	Ronnie McMahan	Vanderbilt	Rodrick Rhodes	Kentucky	
1994–95	N/A	N/A	N/A	N/A	Walter McCarty	Kentucky	
1994–95	N/A	N/A	N/A	N/A	Moochie Norris	Auburn	
1995–96	Antoine Walker	Kentucky	Dametri Hill	Florida	Katu Davis	Georgia	
1995–96	Erick Dampier	Mississippi State	Darryl Wilson	Mississippi State	Walter McCarty	Kentucky	
1995–96	Ronnie Henderson	LSU	Eric Washington	Alabama	Larry Davis	South Carolina	
1995–96	Roy Rogers	Alabama	Frank Seckar	Vanderbilt	Wes Flanigan	Auburn	
1995–96	Tony Delk*	Kentucky	Steve Hamer	Tennessee	Shandon Anderson	Georgia	
1996–97	Ansu Sesay	Mississippi	Brandon Wharton	Tennessee	Michael Chadwick	Georgia	
1996–97	BJ McKie	South Carolina	Duane Spencer	LSU	Derek Hood	Arkansas	
1996–97	Larry Davis	South Carolina	Eric Washington	Alabama	Derek Anderson	Kentucky	
1996–97	Melvin Watson	South Carolina	Horatio Webster	Mississippi State	Pat Bradley	Arkansas	
1996–97	Ron Mercer*	Kentucky	Pax Whitehead	Vanderbilt	Ray Harrison	Georgia	
1997–98	Ansu Sesay*	Mississippi	Bryant Smith	Auburn	Brandon Wharton	Tennessee	
1997–98	BJ McKie	South Carolina	Nick Davis	Arkansas	G. G. Smith	Georgia	
1997–98	Drew Maddux	Vanderbilt	Scott Padgett	Kentucky	Tyrone Washington	Mississippi State	
1997–98	Nazr Mohammed	Kentucky	Melvin Watson	South Carolina	Tony Harris	Tennessee	
1997–98	Horatio Webster	Mississippi State	Pat Bradley	Arkansas	Jumaine Jones	Georgia	
1997–98	N/A	N/A	C. J. Black	Tennessee	N/A	N/A	
1998–99	BJ McKie	South Carolina	Bryant Smith	Auburn	Brandon Wharton	Tennessee	
1998–99	Chris Porter*	Auburn	Dan Langhi	Vanderbilt	Jabari Smith	LSU	
1998–99	Doc Robinson	Auburn	Derek Hood	Arkansas	Jeremy Hays	Alabama	
1998–99	Jumaine Jones	Georgia	Scott Padgett	Kentucky	Mamadou N'Diaye	Auburn	
1998–99	Keith Carter	Mississippi	Tony Harris	Tennessee	Maurice Carter	LSU	
1998–99	N/A	N/A	Tyrone Washington	Mississippi State	N/A	N/A	

=== 2000–2009 ===
Season	First team		Second team		Third team		Ref
Season	Player	Team	Player	Team	Player	Team	Ref
1999–2000	Dan Langhi†	Vanderbilt	Chris Porter	Auburn	Joe Johnson	Arkansas	
1999–2000	Mike Miller	Florida	Doc Robinson	Auburn	Udonis Haslem	Florida	
1999–2000	Jamaal Magloire	Kentucky	Tayshaun Prince	Kentucky	Anthony Evans	Georgia	
1999–2000	Stromile Swift†	LSU	Jabari Smith	LSU	Robert Jackson	Mississippi State	
1999–2000	Tony Harris	Tennessee	Vincent Yarbrough	Tennessee	Wis Isiah	Tennessee	
2000–01	Brett Nelson	Florida	Joe Johnson	Arkansas	Adam Harrington	Auburn	
2000–01	Udonis Haslem	Florida	Keith Bogans	Kentucky	Ron Slay	Tennessee	
2000–01	Rod Grizzard	Alabama	Ersin Dagli	Alabama	Marquis Daniels	Auburn	
2000–01	Tayshaun Prince*	Kentucky	D. A. Layne	Georgia	Jannero Pargo	Arkansas	
2000–01	N/A	N/A	Vincent Yarbrough	Tennessee	Ronald Dupree	LSU	
2001–02	Erwin Dudley*	Alabama	Brett Nelson	Florida	Rod Grizzard	Alabama	
2001–02	Jarvis Hayes	Georgia	Marcus Haislip	Tennessee	Jannero Pargo	Arkansas	
2001–02	Tayshaun Prince	Kentucky	Mario Austin	Mississippi State	Ezra Williams	Georgia	
2001–02	Udonis Haslem	Florida	Matt Bonner	Florida	Jamel Bradley	South Carolina	
2001–02	Vincent Yarbrough	Tennessee	Ronald Dupree	LSU	Matt Freije	Vanderbilt	
2001–02	N/A	N/A	Justin Reed	Mississippi	N/A	N/A	

Season	First team		Second team		Ref
Season	Player	Team	Player	Team	Ref
2002–03	Jarvis Hayes	Georgia	Erwin Dudley	Alabama	
2002–03	Keith Bogans†	Kentucky	Ezra Williams	Georgia	
2002–03	Mario Austin	Mississippi State	Marquis Daniels	Auburn	
2002–03	Matt Bonner	Florida	Marquis Estill	Kentucky	
2002–03	Ron Slay†	Tennessee	Ronald Dupree	LSU	
2002–03	N/A	N/A	Matt Freije	Vanderbilt	
2003–04	Anthony Roberson	Florida	Jaime Lloreda	LSU	
2003–04	Gerald Fitch	Kentucky	Chuck Hayes	Kentucky	
2003–04	Justin Reed	Mississippi	Jonathon Modica	Arkansas	
2003–04	Lawrence Roberts*	Mississippi State	David Lee	Florida	
2003–04	Matt Freije	Vanderbilt	Matt Walsh	Florida	
2003–04	Timmy Bowers	Mississippi State	Rashad Wright	Georgia	
2003–04	Kennedy Winston	Alabama	Scooter McFadgon	Tennessee	
2003–04	Erik Daniels	Kentucky	Marco Killingsworth	Auburn	
2004–05	Anthony Roberson	Florida	Corey Smith	Vanderbilt	
2004–05	Brandon Bass*	LSU	Charles Davis	Alabama	
2004–05	Chuck Hayes	Kentucky	Patrick Sparks	Kentucky	
2004–05	Kennedy Winston	Alabama	Glen Davis	LSU	
2004–05	Lawrence Roberts	Mississippi State	Kelenna Azubuike	Kentucky	
2004–05	Earnest Shelton	Alabama	Matt Walsh	Florida	
2004–05	Ronnie Brewer	Arkansas	Carlos Powell	South Carolina	
2004–05	David Lee	Florida	Shane Power	Mississippi State	
2005–06	Chris Lofton	Tennessee	Al Horford	Florida	
2005–06	Glen Davis*	LSU	C. J. Watson	Tennessee	
2005–06	Joakim Noah	Florida	Tyrus Thomas	LSU	
2005–06	Ronald Steele	Alabama	Rajon Rondo	Kentucky	
2005–06	Ronnie Brewer	Arkansas	Charles Rhodes	Mississippi State	
2005–06	Jermareo Davidson	Alabama	Taurean Green	Florida	
2005–06	Darrel Mitchell	LSU	Jonathon Modica	Arkansas	
2005–06	Shan Foster	Vanderbilt	Tarence Kinsey	South Carolina	
2006–07	Al Horford	Florida	Charles Rhodes	Mississippi State	
2006–07	Chris Lofton†	Tennessee	Todd Abernathy	Mississippi	
2006–07	Derrick Byars†	Vanderbilt	Jermareo Davidson	Alabama	
2006–07	Glen Davis	LSU	Patrick Beverley	Arkansas	
2006–07	Randolph Morris	Kentucky	Shan Foster	Vanderbilt	
2006–07	Tre Kelley	South Carolina	Clarence Sanders	Mississippi	
2006–07	Corey Brewer	Florida	Taurean Green	Florida	
2006–07	Joakim Noah	Florida	Sundiata Gaines	Georgia	
2006–07	Jamont Gordon	Mississippi State	Richard Hendrix	Alabama	
2007–08	Chris Lofton	Tennessee	Andrew Ogilvy	Vanderbilt	
2007–08	Devan Downey	South Carolina	Dwayne Curtis	Mississippi	
2007–08	Jamont Gordon	Mississippi State	Joe Crawford	Kentucky	
2007–08	Richard Hendrix	Alabama	Nick Calathes	Florida	
2007–08	Shan Foster*	Vanderbilt	Sundiata Gaines	Georgia	
2007–08	Tyler Smith	Tennessee	JaJuan Smith	Tennessee	
2007–08	Sonny Weems	Arkansas	Marcus Thornton	LSU	
2007–08	Ramel Bradley	Kentucky	Patrick Patterson	Kentucky	
2007–08	Charles Rhodes	Mississippi State	N/A	N/A	
2008–09	Devan Downey	South Carolina	Andrew Ogilvy	Vanderbilt	
2008–09	Jarvis Varnado	Mississippi State	David Huertas	Mississippi	
2008–09	Jodie Meeks	Kentucky	Garrett Temple	LSU	
2008–09	Marcus Thornton*	LSU	Mike Washington	Arkansas	
2008–09	Nick Calathes	Florida	Terrico White	Mississippi	
2008–09	Tasmin Mitchell	LSU	Alonzo Gee	Alabama	
2008–09	Tyler Smith	Tennessee	Dominique Archie	South Carolina	
2008–09	Patrick Patterson	Kentucky	Korvotney Barber	Auburn	
2008–09	N/A	N/A	Wayne Chism	Tennessee	
2008–09	N/A	N/A	Zam Fredrick	South Carolina	

=== 2010–2019 ===
Season	First team		Second team		Ref
Season	Players	Teams	Players	Teams	Ref
2009–10	DeMarcus Cousins	Kentucky	Andrew Ogilvy	Vanderbilt	
2009–10	Devan Downey	South Carolina	Courtney Fortson	Arkansas	
2009–10	Jarvis Varnado	Mississippi State	Erving Walker	Florida	
2009–10	John Wall*	Kentucky	Tasmin Mitchell	LSU	
2009–10	Trey Thompkins	Georgia	Chris Warren	Mississippi	
2009–10	Patrick Patterson	Kentucky	Mikhail Torrance	Alabama	
2009–10	Wayne Chism	Tennessee	Dee Bost	Mississippi State	
2009–10	Jermaine Beal	Vanderbilt	Jeffery Taylor	Vanderbilt	
2010–11	Chandler Parsons*	Florida	Travis Leslie	Georgia	
2010–11	Chris Warren	Mississippi	Erving Walker	Florida	
2010–11	JaMychal Green	Alabama	Jeffery Taylor	Vanderbilt	
2010–11	John Jenkins	Vanderbilt	Rotnei Clarke	Arkansas	
2010–11	Terrence Jones	Kentucky	Tobias Harris	Tennessee	
2010–11	Trey Thompkins	Georgia	Dee Bost	Mississippi State	
2010–11	Brandon Knight	Kentucky	Festus Ezeli	Vanderbilt	
2010–11	Scotty Hopson	Tennessee	Kenny Boynton	Florida	
2010–11	N/A	N/A	Tony Mitchell	Alabama	
2011–12	Anthony Davis*	Kentucky	B. J. Young	Arkansas	
2011–12	Arnett Moultrie	Mississippi State	Doron Lamb	Kentucky	
2011–12	Dee Bost	Mississippi State	JaMychal Green	Alabama	
2011–12	John Jenkins	Vanderbilt	Jeronne Maymon	Tennessee	
2011–12	Michael Kidd-Gilchrist	Kentucky	Terrance Henry	Kentucky	
2011–12	Jeffery Taylor	Vanderbilt	Justin Hamilton	LSU	
2011–12	Bradley Beal	Florida	Terrence Jones	Kentucky	
2011–12	Kenny Boynton	Florida	Erving Walker	Florida	
2011–12	N/A	N/A	Trevor Releford	Alabama	
2012–13	Erik Murphy	Florida	B. J. Young	Arkansas	
2012–13	Jordan McRae	Tennessee	Jarnell Stokes	Tennessee	
2012–13	Kentavious Caldwell-Pope*	Georgia	Kenny Boynton	Florida	
2012–13	Nerlens Noel	Kentucky	Marshall Henderson	Mississippi	
2012–13	Trevor Releford	Alabama	Mike Rosario	Florida	
2012–13	Johnny O'Bryant III	LSU	Patric Young	Florida	
2012–13	Phil Pressey	Missouri	Murphy Holloway	Mississippi	
2012–13	Elston Turner Jr.	Texas A&M	Laurence Bowers	Missouri	
2012–13	N/A	N/A	Marshawn Powell	Arkansas	
2013–14	Casey Prather	Florida	Bobby Portis	Arkansas	
2013–14	Jabari Brown	Missouri	Chris Denson	Auburn	
2013–14	Jarnell Stokes	Tennessee	Jarvis Summers	Mississippi	
2013–14	Julius Randle	Kentucky	Jordan Clarkson	Missouri	
2013–14	Scottie Wilbekin*	Florida	Jordan Mickey	LSU	
2013–14	Trevor Releford	Alabama	Charles Mann	Georgia	
2013–14	Johnny O'Bryant III	LSU	James Young	Kentucky	
2013–14	Jordan McRae	Tennessee	Rod Odom	Vanderbilt	
2013–14	N/A	N/A	Patric Young	Florida	
2013–14	N/A	N/A	Marshall Henderson	Mississippi	
2014–15	Bobby Portis*	Arkansas	Aaron Harrison	Kentucky	
2014–15	Jarell Martin	LSU	Michael Qualls	Arkansas	
2014–15	Jordan Mickey	LSU	Devin Booker	Kentucky	
2014–15	Josh Richardson	Tennessee	Jalen Jones	Texas A&M	
2014–15	Karl-Anthony Towns	Kentucky	Levi Randolph	Alabama	
2014–15	Stefan Moody	Mississippi	Craig Sword	Mississippi State	
2014–15	Willie Cauley-Stein	Kentucky	Marcus Thornton	Georgia	
2014–15	Danuel House Jr.	Texas A&M	Dorian Finney-Smith	Florida	
2014–15	Damian Jones	Vanderbilt	K. T. Harrell	Auburn	
2015–16	Ben Simmons	LSU	Alex Caruso	Texas A&M	
2015–16	Jalen Jones	Texas A&M	Danuel House Jr.	Texas A&M	
2015–16	Jamal Murray	Kentucky	J. J. Frazier	Georgia	
2015–16	Stefan Moody	Mississippi	Yante Maten	Georgia	
2015–16	Tyler Ulis*	Kentucky	Wade Baldwin IV	Vanderbilt	
2015–16	Retin Obasohan	Alabama	Dorian Finney-Smith	Florida	
2015–16	Michael Carrera	South Carolina	Kevin Punter	Tennessee	
2015–16	Damian Jones	Vanderbilt	Moses Kingsley	Arkansas	
2016–17	De'Aaron Fox	Kentucky	Antonio Blakeney	LSU	
2016–17	J. J. Frazier	Georgia	Kasey Hill	Florida	
2016–17	Luke Kornet	Vanderbilt	Moses Kingsley	Arkansas	
2016–17	Malik Monk†	Kentucky	Robert Hubbs III	Tennessee	
2016–17	Sebas Saiz	Mississippi	Bam Adebayo	Kentucky	
2016–17	Sindarius Thornwell†	South Carolina	Tyler Davis	Texas A&M	
2016–17	KeVaughn Allen	Florida	Quinndary Weatherspoon	Mississippi State	
2016–17	Yante Maten	Georgia	Robert Williams III	Texas A&M	
2017–18	Jaylen Barford	Arkansas	Admiral Schofield	Tennessee	
2017–18	Chris Silva	South Carolina	Jared Harper	Auburn	
2017–18	Kassius Robertson	Missouri	Jeff Roberson	Vanderbilt	
2017–18	Chris Chiozza	Florida	Shai Gilgeous-Alexander	Kentucky	
2017–18	Grant Williams†	Tennessee	Collin Sexton	Alabama	
2017–18	Kevin Knox II	Kentucky	Bryce Brown	Auburn	
2017–18	Tyler Davis	Texas A&M	Daryl Macon	Arkansas	
2017–18	Yante Maten†	Georgia	Quinndary Weatherspoon	Mississippi State	
2018–19	Admiral Schofield	Tennessee	Bryce Brown	Auburn	
2018–19	Breein Tyree	Mississippi	Jordan Bone	Tennessee	
2018–19	Chris Silva	South Carolina	Nic Claxton	Georgia	
2018–19	Daniel Gafford	Arkansas	Terence Davis	Mississippi	
2018–19	Grant Williams*	Tennessee	Jared Harper	Auburn	
2018–19	P. J. Washington	Kentucky	Keldon Johnson	Kentucky	
2018–19	Quinndary Weatherspoon	Mississippi State	Skylar Mays	LSU	
2018–19	Tremont Waters	LSU	Tyler Herro	Kentucky	

=== 2020–present ===
Season	First team		Second team		Ref
Season	Player	Team	Player	Team	Ref
2019–20	Breein Tyree	Mississippi	Anthony Edwards	Georgia	
2019–20	Immanuel Quickley†	Kentucky	Isaac Okoro	Auburn	
2019–20	Keyontae Johnson	Florida	John Fulkerson	Tennessee	
2019–20	Kira Lewis Jr.	Alabama	John Petty Jr.	Alabama	
2019–20	Mason Jones†	Arkansas	Kerry Blackshear Jr.	Florida	
2019–20	Nick Richards	Kentucky	Maik Kotsar	South Carolina	
2019–20	Reggie Perry†	Mississippi State	Saben Lee	Vanderbilt	
2019–20	Samir Doughty	Auburn	Tyrese Maxey	Kentucky	
2019–20	Skylar Mays	LSU	N/A	N/A	
2020–21	Cam Thomas	LSU	A. J. Lawson	South Carolina	
2020–21	Devontae Shuler	Mississippi	Colin Castleton	Florida	
2020–21	Dru Smith	Missouri	D. J. Stewart Jr.	Mississippi State	
2020–21	Herbert Jones*	Alabama	Jaden Shackelford	Alabama	
2020–21	John Petty Jr.	Alabama	Javonte Smart	LSU	
2020–21	Moses Moody	Arkansas	Jeremiah Tilmon	Missouri	
2020–21	Scotty Pippen Jr.	Vanderbilt	Sahvir Wheeler	Georgia	
2020–21	Tre Mann	Florida	Trendon Watford	LSU	
2021–22	Iverson Molinar	Mississippi State	Colin Castleton	Florida	
2021–22	Jabari Smith Jr.	Auburn	Darius Days	LSU	
2021–22	Jaylin Williams	Arkansas	Jaden Shackelford	Alabama	
2021–22	JD Notae	Arkansas	Kennedy Chandler	Tennessee	
2021–22	Oscar Tshiebwe*	Kentucky	Kobe Brown	Missouri	
2021–22	Santiago Véscovi	Tennessee	Quenton Jackson	Texas A&M	
2021–22	Scotty Pippen Jr.	Vanderbilt	Sahvir Wheeler	Kentucky	
2021–22	Tari Eason	LSU	TyTy Washington Jr.	Kentucky	
2021–22	Walker Kessler	Auburn	N/A	N/A	
2022–23	Brandon Miller*	Alabama	Anthony Black	Arkansas	
2022–23	Colin Castleton	Florida	Johni Broome	Auburn	
2022–23	Kobe Brown	Missouri	KJ Williams	LSU	
2022–23	Liam Robbins	Vanderbilt	Mark Sears	Alabama	
2022–23	Oscar Tshiebwe	Kentucky	Ricky Council IV	Arkansas	
2022–23	Santiago Véscovi	Tennessee	Tyrece Radford	Texas A&M	
2022–23	Tolu Smith	Mississippi State	Wendell Green Jr.	Auburn	
2022–23	Wade Taylor IV	Texas A&M	Zakai Zeigler	Tennessee	
2023–24	Antonio Reeves	Kentucky	Jaylin Williams	Auburn	
2023–24	Dalton Knecht*	Tennessee	Jonas Aidoo	Tennessee	
2023–24	Johni Broome	Auburn	Josh Hubbard	Mississippi State	
2023–24	Mark Sears	Alabama	Matthew Murrell	Mississippi	
2023–24	Tolu Smith	Mississippi State	Meechie Johnson	South Carolina	
2023–24	Wade Taylor IV	Texas A&M	Reed Sheppard	Kentucky	
2023–24	Zakai Zeigler	Tennessee	Rob Dillingham	Kentucky	
2023–24	Zyon Pullin	Florida	Ta'Lon Cooper	South Carolina	
2023–24	N/A	N/A	Tyrese Samuel	Florida	
2023–24	N/A	N/A	Walter Clayton Jr.	Florida	

Season	First team		Second team		Third team		Ref
Season	Player	Team	Player	Team	Player	Team	Ref
2024–25	Johni Broome*	Auburn	Chaz Lanier	Tennessee	Alex Condon	Florida	
2024–25	Mark Sears	Alabama	Collin Murray-Boyles	South Carolina	Chad Baker-Mazara	Auburn	
2024–25	Wade Taylor IV	Texas A&M	Josh Hubbard	Mississippi State	Jason Edwards	Vanderbilt	
2024–25	Walter Clayton Jr.	Florida	Otega Oweh	Kentucky	Mark Mitchell	Missouri	
2024–25	Zakai Zeigler	Tennessee	Tre Johnson	Texas	Sean Pedulla	Mississippi	
2025–26	Darius Acuff Jr.*	Arkansas	Nate Ament	Tennessee	Rashaun Agee	Texas A&M	
2025–26	Ja'Kobi Gillespie	Tennessee	Rueben Chinyelu	Florida	Alex Condon	Florida	
2025–26	Thomas Haugh	Florida	Mark Mitchell	Missouri	Keyshawn Hall	Auburn	
2025–26	Labaron Philon Jr.	Alabama	Otega Oweh	Kentucky	Aden Holloway	Alabama	
2025–26	Tyler Tanner	Vanderbilt	Dailyn Swain	Texas	Josh Hubbard	Mississippi State	
