= 1975 NCAA Men's Basketball All-Americans =

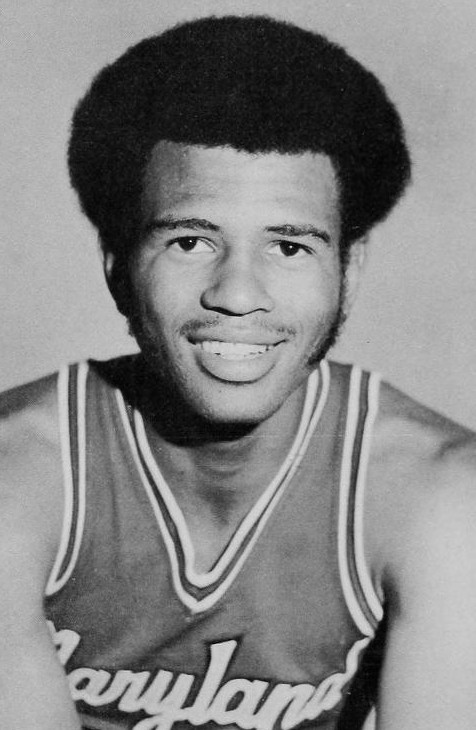
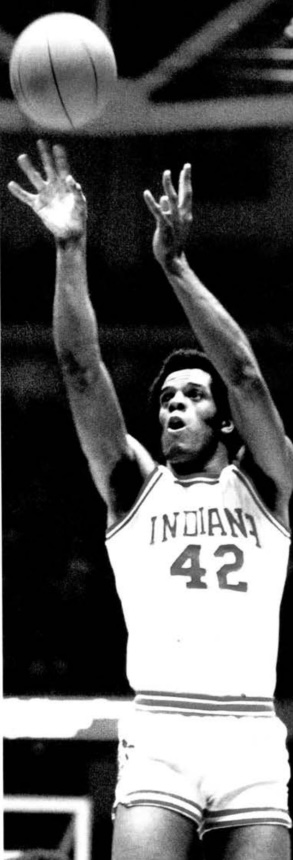
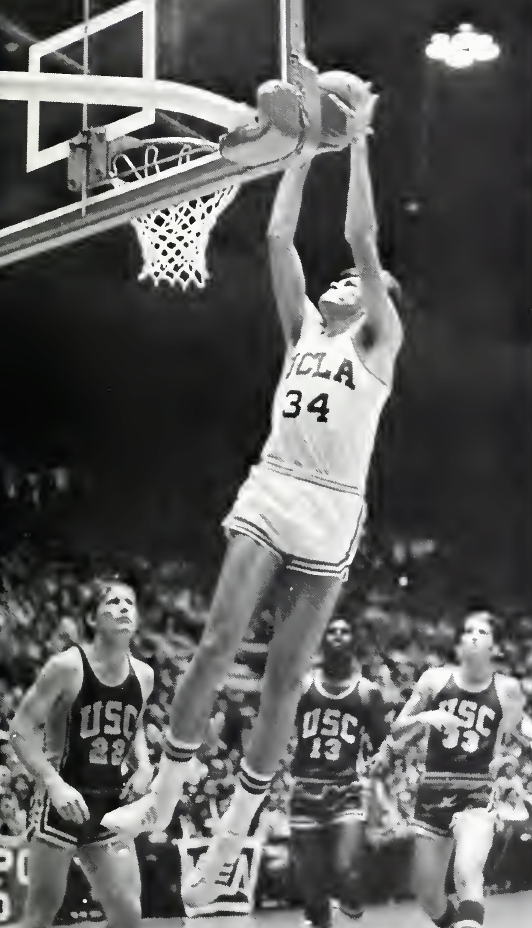
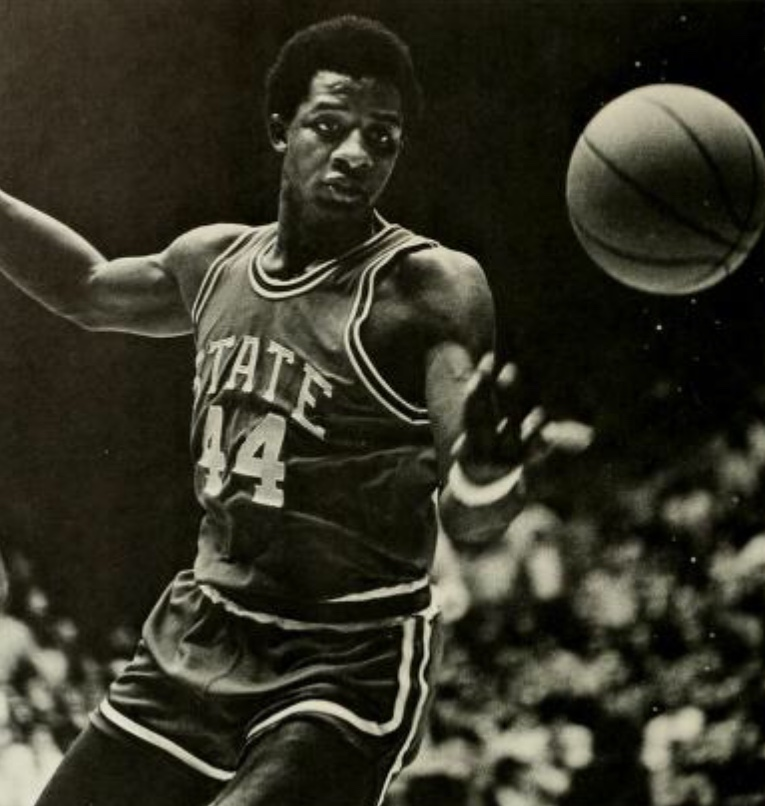
- Members of the 1975 Consensus All-America first team. Clockwise from upper left: Lucas, May, Thompson, Meyers (not pictured: Dantley).
- Awarded for: 1974–75 NCAA Division I men's basketball season

The consensus 1975 College Basketball All-American team, as determined by aggregating the results of four major All-American teams. To earn "consensus" status, a player must win honors from a majority of the following teams: the Associated Press, the USBWA, The United Press International and the National Association of Basketball Coaches.

== 1975 Consensus All-America team ==
Consensus First Team
Player	Position	Class	Team
Adrian Dantley	F	Sophomore	Notre Dame
John Lucas	G	Junior	Maryland
Scott May	F	Junior	Indiana
Dave Meyers	F	Senior	UCLA
David Thompson	G/F	Senior	North Carolina State

Consensus Second Team
Player	Position	Class	Team
Luther Burden	G	Junior	Utah
Leon Douglas	F/C	Junior	Alabama
Kevin Grevey	G	Senior	Kentucky
Ron Lee	G	Junior	Oregon
Gus Williams	G	Senior	Southern California

== Individual All-America teams ==
All-America Team
All-America Team	First team		Second team		Third team		Fourth Team		Fifth Team	
All-America Team	Player	School	Player	School	Player	School	Player	School	Player	School
Associated Press	Luther Burden	Utah	Leon Douglas	Alabama	Lionel Hollins	Arizona State	No fourth or fifth teams			
Associated Press	Adrian Dantley	Notre Dame	Kevin Grevey	Kentucky	Ron Lee	Oregon	No fourth or fifth teams			
Associated Press	Scott May	Indiana	Rudy Hackett	Syracuse	Clyde Mayes	Furman	No fourth or fifth teams			
Associated Press	Dave Meyers	UCLA	John Lucas	Maryland	Bob McCurdy	Richmond	No fourth or fifth teams			
Associated Press	David Thompson	North Carolina State	Gus Williams	Southern California	Phil Sellers	Rutgers	No fourth or fifth teams			
USBWA	Adrian Dantley	Notre Dame	Junior Bridgeman	Louisville	No third, fourth or fifth teams					
USBWA	Leon Douglas	Alabama	Luther Burden	Utah	No third, fourth or fifth teams					
USBWA	Kevin Grevey	Kentucky	John Lucas	Maryland	No third, fourth or fifth teams					
USBWA	Dave Meyers	UCLA	Scott May	Indiana	No third, fourth or fifth teams					
USBWA	David Thompson	North Carolina State	Gus Williams	Southern California	No third, fourth or fifth teams					
NABC	Adrian Dantley	Notre Dame	Luther Burden	Utah	Alvan Adams	Oklahoma	Kent Benson	Indiana	Charles Cleveland	Alabama
NABC	Ron Lee	Oregon	Leon Douglas	Alabama	Quinn Buckner	Indiana	Junior Bridgeman	Louisville	Ron Haigler	Penn
NABC	John Lucas	Maryland	Kevin Grevey	Kentucky	Steve Green	Indiana	Bo Ellis	Marquette	Joe Meriweather	Southern Illinois
NABC	Dave Meyers	UCLA	Scott May	Indiana	Lionel Hollins	Arizona State	Rich Kelley	Stanford	Frank Oleynick	Seattle
NABC	David Thompson	North Carolina State	Gus Williams	Southern California	Bernard King	Tennessee	Clyde Mayes	Furman	Robert Parish	Centenary
UPI	Adrian Dantley	Notre Dame	Quinn Buckner	Indiana	Junior Bridgeman	Louisville	No fourth or fifth teams			
UPI	John Lucas	Maryland	Luther Burden	Utah	Leon Douglas	Alabama	No fourth or fifth teams			
UPI	Scott May	Indiana	Kevin Grevey	Kentucky	Steve Green	Indiana	No fourth or fifth teams			
UPI	Dave Meyers	UCLA	Bernard King	Tennessee	Rich Kelley	Stanford	No fourth or fifth teams			
UPI	David Thompson	North Carolina State	Ron Lee	Oregon	Gus Williams	Southern California	No fourth or fifth teams			

AP Honorable Mention:

- Alvan Adams, Oklahoma
- Bill Andreas, Ohio State
- Kent Benson, Indiana
- Otis Birdsong, Houston
- Junior Bridgeman, Louisville
- Darryl Brown, Fordham
- Skip Brown, Wake Forest
- Joe Bryant, La Salle
- George Bucci, Manhattan
- Quinn Buckner, Indiana
- Charles Cleveland, Alabama
- Kevin Cluess, St. John's
- Bill Cook, Memphis State
- Wesley Cox, Louisville
- Brad Davis, Maryland
- Johnny Davis, Dayton
- Walter Davis, North Carolina
- Jacky Dorsey, Georgia
- Arnold Dugger, Oral Roberts
- Louis Dunbar, Houston
- Bo Ellis, Marquette
- Alex English, South Carolina
- Al Fleming, Arizona
- Jerry Fort, Nebraska
- Jeff Fosnes, Vanderbilt
- Terry Furlow, Michigan State
- John Garrett, Purdue
- Mike Glenn, Southern Illinois
- Ron Gottschalk, Vermont
- Steve Green, Indiana
- Ernie Grunfeld, Tennessee
- Ron Haigler, Penn
- Lindsay Hairston, Michigan State
- Glenn Hansen, LSU
- Tony Hanson, Connecticut
- Phil Hicks, Tulane
- Mo Howard, Maryland
- Hercle Ivy, Iowa State
- Jerry Jenkins, Mississippi State
- Eddie Johnson, Auburn
- Dahle Keehler, Wisconsin
- Rich Kelley, Stanford
- Bernard King, Tennessee
- Danny Knight, Kansas
- Mitch Kupchak, North Carolina
- Walter Luckett, Ohio
- Joe Meriweather, Southern Illinois
- John Murphy, UMass
- Frank Oleynick, Seattle
- Robert Parish, Centenary
- Chris Potter, Holy Cross
- John Ramsay, Seton Hall
- Bill Robinzine, DePaul
- Moe Rivers, NC State
- Rubén Rodríguez, Long Island
- Tree Rollins, Clemson
- Rick Schmidt, Illinois
- Lonnie Shelton, Oregon State
- Ricky Sobers, UNLV
- Rick Suttle, Kansas
- Monte Towe, NC State
- Mel Utley, St. John's
- Kerry Walker, Boston University
- Lloyd Walton, Marquette
- Bob Warren, Maine
- Richard Washington, UCLA
- Chuckie Williams, Kansas State
- Skip Wise, Clemson

== See also ==
- 1974–75 NCAA Division I men's basketball season
