= B. J. Young =

B. J. Young may refer to:

- B. J. Young (ice hockey) (1977–2005), ice hockey right winger
- B. J. Young (basketball) (born 1993), American basketball player
