= Palubinskas =

- Lithuanian surname
- m.: Palubinskas
- f.: (unmarried): Palubinskaitė
- f.: (married): Palubinskienė
- Related names: Palubinski, Palubinsky (Russian: Палубинский)

Palubinskas is a Lithuanian language surname. It may refer to:

- Ed Palubinskas, Australian basketballer
- Feliksas Palubinskas, Lithuanian politician, member of Seimas
