= Jeff Fosnes =

American basketball player

Jeff Fosnes (born January 16, 1954) is a former basketball player from Wheat Ridge High School and Vanderbilt University. Jeff was raised in Lakewood, Colorado, the son of Carl and Jay Fosnes.

== High school ==
At Wheat Ridge High School from 1969 to 1972, Fosnes was "regarded by many as the best basketball player in state annals. Garnering three years all state, he led the Farmers to two seconds and a third in the state tournament. Averaging over twenty points per game for his prep career, he scored thirty-five points in the first three quarters of the 1971 state title game vs. Mitchell." Fosnes was named a Sunkist High School All-American in 1972 alongside Robert Parish and Quinn Buckner.

== College ==
Fosnes joined the Vanderbilt Commodores in 1972 as a part of a historic freshman class, "Roy Skinner's famed 'F-Troop', a nickname coined by Nashville Banner sports editor Dudley 'Waxo' Green." In 1974, Vanderbilt would win the SEC Championship. Fosnes was an integral part of this team that included Jan van Breda Kolff, Butch Feher, and Joe Ford. Fosnes was selected to the NCAA All-Tournament Team in 1974, as the Commodores fell to Marquette and Notre Dame. During the same year, Fosnes became Vanderbilt's first Academic All-American, an accolade he would receive again the following year. No other Vanderbilt basketball player would attain the honor until Bruce Elder in 1993.

Fosnes was honored as a First Team All-SEC selection by the coaches in 1975 and 1976.

The 1975 Trojan Classic at USC selected Fosnes as the tournament MVP.

His career at Vanderbilt finished with a 15.5 PPG and .521 FG%.

Fosnes played in the 1976 East/West All-Star game in Tulsa, OK. Fosnes was coached in the game by Dean Smith and played with Quinn Buckner, Scott May, Mitch Kupchak, and Leon Douglas.

In 1976, Fosnes was drafted by the Golden State Warriors in the 4th round, but chose to forgo the NBA in favor of medical school.

== Career, Single game, and Single season Records ==
Fosnes finished his career as the second all-time leading scorer behind Clyde Lee with 1,579 points. He is currently 9th on Vanderbilt's scoring list.

His 1974–75 scoring average of 22.1 PPG ranks tied-4th for the highest single season scoring average in Vanderbilt history.

Fosnes scored 39 points vs. Jacksonville University which ties him for the sixth highest scoring single game in Vanderbilt history.

Fosnes currently ranks 3rd in career Made FGs with 651. His 1974–75 season of 238 Made FGs is the 4th highest total in Vanderbilt history.

== Post-college career ==
Fosnes followed up his basketball career by pursuing a medical degree at the Vanderbilt University School of Medicine. He was "one of eighty-three students selected from 6100 applicants". After finishing his residency at Bayfront Medical Center with the University of South Florida in 1983, Fosnes moved to Springfield, Tennessee where he currently resides with his wife Margot; they have two adult children, C.A. and Tyler, plus a grandson, Abe. Fosnes practiced in family medicine, first in Centerville, Tennessee then in Springfield, from 1983 until retiring from office practice in 2013. By that time, he had become the medical director at a nursing home in Springfield, and since retiring from office practice has expanded his nursing home practice; as of May 2020, he was medical director and primary physician for two Middle Tennessee nursing homes. Fosnes also regularly serves as a medical missionary to Haiti, normally taking two short-term trips each year to an orphanage supported by his church.
