= Collinsville Community Unit School District 10 =

School district in Madison County, Illinois, United States

Collinsville Community Unit School District 10 is a school district in Illinois. It is made up of nine elementary schools, one intermediate school, one middle school, one high school, one vocational school, and serves the towns of Collinsville, Caseyville, Fairmont City and Maryville.

It is governed by a 7-member school board.

== Schools ==
- Caseyville Elementary School
- Collinsville Area Vocational Center
- Collinsville High School
- Dorris Intermediate School
- Collinsville Middle School
- Hollywood Heights Elementary School
- Jefferson Elementary School
- Kreitner Elementary School
- Maryville Elementary School
- Renfro Elementary School
- Summit Elementary School
- Twin Echo Elementary School
- Webster Elementary School

== See also ==
- List of school districts in Illinois
