= Eric Washington (basketball) =

American basketball player (born 1974)

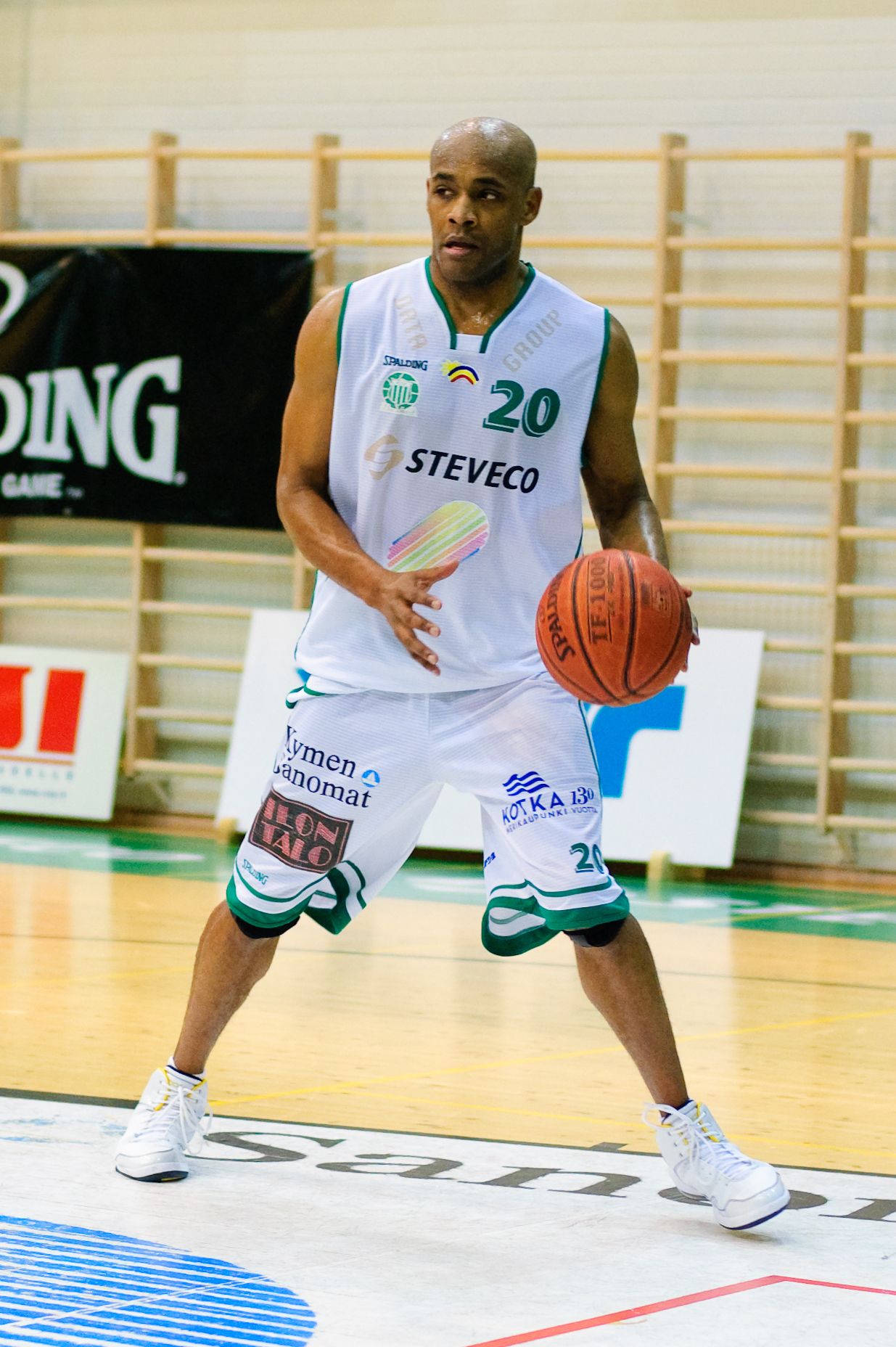

Personal information
- Born: March 23, 1974 (age 52) Pearl, Mississippi, U.S.
- Listed height: 6 ft 4 in (1.93 m)
- Listed weight: 190 lb (86 kg)

Career information
- High school: Pearl (Pearl, Mississippi)
- College: Alabama (1993–1997)
- NBA draft: 1997: 2nd round, 46th overall pick
- Drafted by: Orlando Magic
- Playing career: 1997–2010
- Position: Shooting guard
- Number: 14, 20

Career history
- 1997–1999: Denver Nuggets
- 1999–2000: Dafni Athens
- 2000–2002: Vip / Crabs Rimini
- 2003–2004: Hapoel Jerusalem
- 2005–2006: Idaho Stampede
- 2006–2008: Tampereen Pyrintö
- 2008–2009: Kauhajoen Karhu
- 2009–2010: KTP-Basket
- 2010: Nürnberger BC

Career highlights
- 2× Second-team All-SEC (1996, 1997)
- Stats at NBA.com
- Stats at Basketball Reference

Eric Maurice Washington (born March 23, 1974) is an American former National Basketball Association (NBA) player.

Washington attended the University of Alabama, where he scored 1,532 points, grabbed 557 rebounds, and made 262 three-point field goals. He was selected in the 1997 NBA draft as the 46th overall pick by the Orlando Magic, and appeared for the Denver Nuggets during two seasons, from 1997 to 1999.

He also played professionally in Italy, Israel, China, Finland, and for the Idaho Stampede of the CBA. In 2010, he signed with Nürnberger BC in Germany.
