= Tom Parker (basketball) =

Personal information
- Born: July 1, 1950 (age 76) Illinois, U.S.
- Listed height: 6 ft 6 in (1.98 m)
- Listed weight: 215 lb (98 kg)

Career information
- High school: Collinsville (Collinsville, Illinois)
- College: Kentucky (1969–1972)
- NBA draft: 1972: 6th round, 83rd overall pick
- Drafted by: Cleveland Cavaliers
- Position: Power forward
- Number: 12

Career highlights
- SEC Player of the Year – AP (1972); 2× First team All-SEC (1971, 1972); Second-team Parade All-American (1968)
- Stats at Basketball Reference

Tom Parker (born July 1, 1950) is an American former standout basketball player at the University of Kentucky who played for the Wildcats between 1969 and 1972. As a senior in 1971–72 he was named the co-Southeastern Conference Men's Basketball Player of the Year. As of 2011 he is a teacher at Paul Laurence Dunbar High School in Lexington, Kentucky.

== Early life ==
Parker grew up in Collinsville, Illinois and attended Collinsville High School. Standing at 6 ft 6 in (1.98 m) and weighing 215 pounds (98 kilograms), he played the center position and dominated his opponents. In three seasons of varsity basketball he scored 2,041 career points and set many school records. These records include his career point total, points in a single game (50), season and career scoring averages (32.9 and 23.7, respectively), field goals made in a game (21), season (359) and career (818), shots taken in a career (1,520), total career rebounds (851) as well as defensive rebounds in a career (559). In all three seasons he suited up for the Kahoks he garnered all-state honors, and as a senior he was named a Parade magazine All-American.

== Kentucky and later life ==
When Parker matriculated in 1968–69, NCAA eligibility rules at the time prohibited freshmen from playing on varsity teams, thus his official career at Kentucky did not start until his sophomore campaign in 1969–70. Parker was a solid contributor from the start, averaging 10.4 points per game in 25 appearances. He played a key role as a reserve in a season where the Wildcats won their third of what would be six consecutive Southeastern Conference regular season championships. They advanced to the 1970 NCAA Men's Division I Basketball Tournament's Elite Eight before losing to Jacksonville, 106–100. The following season Parker became a prominent player and a regular starter. In 28 games he averaged 17.5 points, which led Kentucky, and the team reached the Sweet 16 of the NCAA Tournament. He was an All-SEC First Team performer as well as a member on the Academic All-SEC Team. Parker's final season in 1971–72 saw him lead Kentucky back to the NCAA Tournament's Elite Eight behind an 18.0 points per game average. He was named the co-SEC Player of the Year with Mike Edwards of Tennessee and he repeated as a first team all-conference performer.

In 80 career games Parker scored 1,238 points and grabbed 660 rebounds. Parker also unwittingly played a large part in influencing soon-to-be Kentucky star Jack Givens' decision to attend. Givens was not thrilled with Kentucky as a potential school to play for, but after seeing Parker in action his attitude changed. Givens later said, "Tom Parker could really shoot the ball, a lefty small forward who was a lot like Kevin Grevey ... I loved the way Tom played, so that made me change my thinking towards Kentucky."

After his collegiate career, the Cleveland Cavaliers of the National Basketball Association selected him in the sixth round (83rd overall) in the 1972 NBA draft, although Parker never played in the league. He eventually became a teacher and now resides in Lexington, Kentucky.
