= Collinsville High School =

American high school in southern Illinois

Location
- 2201 South Morrison Avenue; Collinsville, Illinois 62234; United States; 38°38′50″N 90°00′40″W

Information
- Type: Public high school
- School district: Collinsville Community Unit 10
- Superintendent: Brad Skertich
- Principal: Daniel Toberman
- Teaching staff: 129.19 (FTE)
- Grades: 9–12
- Gender: Coeducational
- Enrollment: 1,966 (2023–24)
- Average class size: 19.9
- Student to teacher ratio: 15.22
- Colors: Purple and white
- Slogan: "The High School Of Champions"
- Fight song: Indian Trail
- Athletics conference: Southwestern Conference
- Mascot: Chief Kahok
- Nickname: Kahoks
- Newspaper: The Kahoki
- Yearbook: The Kahokian
- Website: chs.kahoks.org

Collinsville High School (CHS) is a four-year public high school in the Collinsville Community Unit School District 10 in Illinois. In 2011, Collinsville High School had an enrollment of 1,985 students.

== Academics ==
In 2015, 85% of the senior class graduated, posting an average ACT score of 20.

Collinsville High School is educational organized into thirteen departments. These include: Business, English, ELL, Family Consumer Science, Fine Arts, Foreign Language, Industrial Technology, Math, PE, Heath, and Drivers Education, Science, Social Studies, Special Education, and Counseling.

== Athletics ==
Collinsville competes in the Southwestern Conference. The school is also a member of the Illinois High School Association (IHSA). Teams are stylized as the Kahoks (pronounced Kay-Hawks).

The school sponsors interscholastic athletic teams for young men and women in basketball, bowling, cross country, golf, soccer, tennis, and track & field. Young men may also compete in baseball, football, and wrestling, while young women may also compete in cheerleading, softball, and volleyball. While not sponsored by the IHSA, the school also sponsors a Marching band and dance team.

=== State titles ===
- Baseball: 1940–41, 1979–80
- Basketball:1960–61, 1964–65
- Bowling (girls): 2009–2010
- Soccer (boys): 1981–82, 1986–87, 1991–92, 1992–93
- Dance Team (girls): 2007-2009, 2011, 2015
- Marching Band: 3rd place at Tiger Ambush Classic (2011); 1st place at prelims, 10th place in Finals, and best general effect at Lafayette Contest of Champions (2011); 1st place in 3A, Best Music, Best Visual, Outstanding General Effect, Best Percussion, Best Color Guard, And Grand Championships of class 1A, 2A, and 3A at McKendree Preview of Champions (2011); 1st place Blue Division, Outstanding Music, and Outstanding Visual at Greater St. Louis Marching Festival. (2011); 2nd Place VP Fair Parade (2012); 3rd place O'Fallon Township High School Metro East Marching Classic participating in class AA. (2012); 1st place in 3A, Best Music, Best Visual, Outstanding General Effect, Best Percussion, Best Color Guard, And Grand Championships of class 1A, 2A, and 3A at McKendree Preview of Champions (2012) First Place, Best Visual at the Veiled Prophet Parade (2013), First Place class 4A, Best Percussion, Best Visual, Best General Effect, Best Color Guard (of the day) at the McKendree Preview of Champions (2013), 4th Place in Class AAA at Bands of America Grand Nationals (2013), Grand Champion, 1st Place in Class 3A Field (Music, Visual, GE, Percussion, Guard) at McKendree Preview of Champions (2014), 1st Place in Class 4A Field (Music, Visual, GE, Percussion, Guard) at McKendree Preview of Champions (2015), 3rd Place in Class 4A Field Metro East Marching Classic (2015), 2nd Place in Class 3A Field at the Tiger Ambush Classic (2015)
- Winter Percussion Ensemble: 1st place MCCGA championships Scholastic B Class (2011)

== Notable alumni ==
- Michelle Bartsch-Hackley, Olympic gold medalist, USA Olympic volleyball player and professional volleyball player
- Hoot Evers - former MLB player (Detroit Tigers, Boston Red Sox, New York Giants, Baltimore Orioles, Cleveland Indians)
- Charlie Kraak - basketball player (Indiana University)
- Harry Parker - former MLB player (St. Louis Cardinals, New York Mets, Cleveland Indians)
- Michael Stipe - lead singer of the band R.E.M.
- John Shimkus (R) - member of the U.S. House of Representatives
- Tom Jager - Olympic gold medalist (swimming)
- Ken Oberkfell - former Major League Baseball player
- George Musso - NFL Hall of Famer (inducted 1982)
- Art Fletcher - former Major League baseball player
- Tom Parker - former basketball player, University of Kentucky
- Kevin Stallings - head basketball coach, Vanderbilt University
- Daniel A. Vallero, research scientist; author; educator (Duke University)
- Joe Reiniger - former soccer player for the St. Louis Ambush, Milwaukee Wave and St. Louis Steamers and current player for the St. Louis Illusion
- Terry Moore - center fielder for the St. Louis Cardinals
- Rear Admiral William D. Baumgartner - United States Coast Guard
- Rick George - president of Texas Rangers, director of operations PGA Tour, athletic director University of Colorado
- Tanner Houck - first round pick in the 2017 MLB Draft by the Boston Red Sox
