= Bryant Smith =

American basketball player

Personal information
- Born: October 21, 1977 (age 49)
- Listed height: 6 ft 9 in (2.06 m)
- Listed weight: 228 lb (103 kg)

Career information
- College: Auburn
- Position: Power forward / center

Career history
- 1996–1997: Poissy Chatou Basket
- 1997–1998: MZT Skopje
- 1998–1999: Sallen Basket
- 1999: Kangoeroes Basket Willebroek
- 2000: Solna Vikings
- 2000–2001: Capitanes de Arecibo

Career highlights
- 2× Second-team All-SEC (1998, 1999)

Bryant Smith (born October 21, 1977) is a former American professional basketball player who played college basketball for Auburn
