= Ed Palubinskas =

Australian basketball player (born 1950)

Personal information
- Born: 17 September 1950 (age 76) Canberra, Australian Capital Territory, Australia
- Listed height: 183 cm (6 ft 0 in)
- Listed weight: 82 kg (181 lb)

Career information
- High school: Narrabundah College (Canberra, Australia)
- College: Ricks College (1970–1972); LSU (1972–1974)
- NBA draft: 1974: 4th round, 61st overall pick
- Drafted by: Atlanta Hawks
- Position: Guard

Career highlights
- Second-team All-SEC (1973)
- Stats at Basketball Reference

Edward Sebastian Palubinskas (born 17 September 1950) is an Australian-American former professional basketball player and coach.

== Playing career ==
=== High school ===
Palubinskas attended Narrabundah College in Canberra, where he practiced different sports (swimming, track and field, football, gymnastics). He started playing basketball at the age of 14 after he broke his ankle playing soccer. In Canberra, he played for a team of Lithuanian immigrants. After moving to Melbourne, Palubinskas played for the St. Kilda Saints, winning the Victorian Championship in 1970.

=== College ===
Coach Lindsay Gaze, who back then considered Palubinskas as "the best offensive player in the history of Australia", put him in contact with Dale Brown, who later became his coach at LSU. Palubinskas moved to the US and started his collegiate career at Ricks College in Rexburg, Idaho in 1970, where he led the US in free throw percentage with 92.4 percents during the 1970–71 season. He holds the record for the most consecutive free throws in a game (14) and 43 consecutive for the season. He won NJCAA All-American status at Ricks College (which is now BYU-Idaho) and scored 24 points a game over his two years. In 1972, Palubinskas transferred to Louisiana State University (LSU), after playing in the 1972 Summer Olympics where he was the second leading scorer missing the Olympic scoring title by one point. At LSU, Palubinskas had a team-high 18.6 points per game in the 1972–73 season and was selected to the All-SEC Coaches Team. In 1973–74, he was the second leading scorer of the team (18.3 points per game) behind Glenn Hansen. While at LSU, Palubinskas hit 87.5 percent (258-of-295) of his free throws. On 1 March 1973, Palubinskas converted 16 of his 16 free throws against Mississippi State, which put him in first place in the LSU record book.

=== Professional ===
Palubinskas was selected in the 1974 NBA draft by the Atlanta Hawks in the fourth round. He was then traded to the New Orleans Jazz and drafted in the eighth round of the ABA draft by the Utah Stars. Palubinskas never played in the NBA. In Australia, he played for the Caulfield Spartans, scoring a record-breaking 66 points in a championship game in 1976.

== National team career ==
After being the second leading scorer in the 1972 Summer Olympics, Palubinskas was the top overall scorer in 1976 Summer Olympics. He set three Olympic scoring records in Montreal, including the record for most points scored in a single Olympics (269), which was broken by Brazilian Oscar Schmidt during the 1988 Summer Olympics. The most points he scored in one game during the Olympics was in 1976, when he had 48 against Mexico in overtime.

He is a member of the Basketball Australia Hall of Fame.

== Coaching career ==
Palubinskas served as an assistant coach at Brigham Young University from 1986 to 1989. In 1991–92, he held the same position at Louisiana State University. At the high school level in the US, Palubinskas was the head coach at Central Private School in Central, Louisiana from 1992 to 1996. He also was a basketball coach at East Carbon High School in Sunnyside, Utah and East High School in Salt Lake City.

Palubinskas took a position as shooting coach to Shaquille O'Neal with the Los Angeles Lakers for the 2000–01 NBA season. Following the Lakers' triumph in the NBA, Palubinskas also received an NBA champion's ring. He also worked with Brandon Bass, Dwight Howard, Lisa Leslie and Lauren Jackson. He has his own basketball school named The Palubinskas Basketball Academy. Palubinskas published two instructional video tapes ("Secrets to Perfect Shooting Principles" and "The Shooters' Lab") on shooting technique. In 2004, he published his findings on shooting the basketball in the FIBA Assist Magazine.

== Career highlights ==
- "Mr. Basketball Australia" – 1970
- 1972 and 1976 All-World Olympic team
- Most points scored in Olympic history (269) – 1976
- Guinness book world record- most free throws (18) made in 2 minutes blindfolded in Phoenix AZ. at NBA ALL-Star weekend
- ACT Sport Hall of Fame inductee in 2021

== Personal life ==
Palubinskas was born to a Lithuanian father and a Russian mother. Palubinskas is a member of the Church of Jesus Christ of Latter-day Saints.

Palubinskas settled in the United States and never considered returning to Australia as he considered it was "socialist and doesn't take care of their athletes financially." He acquired American citizenship in 1988.
