= A. W. Davis =

American basketball player and coach (1943–2014)

Personal information
- Born: June 13, 1943 Rutledge, Tennessee, U.S.
- Died: September 23, 2014 (aged 71) Knoxville, Tennessee, U.S.
- Listed height: 6 ft 7 in (2.01 m)
- Listed weight: 185 lb (84 kg)

Career information
- High school: Rutledge (Rutledge, Tennessee)
- College: Tennessee (1962–1965)
- NBA draft: 1965: 5th round, 43rd overall pick
- Drafted by: Los Angeles Lakers
- Position: Center
- Number: 20
- Coaching career: 1966–1977

Career history

Coaching
- 1966–1969: McMinn Central HS
- 1969–1975: Tennessee (assistant)
- 1975–1977: Walters State CC

Career highlights
- First-team All-American – USBWA (1965); Third-team All-American – AP, UPI (1965); 2× First-team All-SEC (1964, 1965)
- Stats at Basketball Reference

Arvis W. Davis (June 13, 1943 – September 23, 2014) was an American basketball player and coach. Davis is best known for his All-American college career at the University of Tennessee (UT). He was known by several nicknames, including the "Rutledge Rifle" and "The Man With the Golden Arm."

Davis, a 6"7' center, came to Tennessee from Rutledge, Tennessee, where he once scored 71 points in a game. In his three-year college career (freshmen were ineligible at this time), Davis scored 1,255 points (17.3 per game) and 574 rebounds (8.1 per game). As a senior, Davis averaged 19.6 points and 8.2 points per game and was named a first team All-American by the United States Basketball Writers Association, the first player in program history so honored. He was also named first-team All-Southeastern Conference and a third team All-American by the Associated Press and United Press International.

Following the close of his college career, Davis was drafted in the fifth round of the 1965 NBA draft (43rd pick overall), but never played in the league. He began his coaching career in 1966 at McMinn Central High School in Englewood, Tennessee. In 1969 he was named an assistant at his alma mater, and in 1975 was named head coach at Walters State Community College in Morristown, Tennessee. He left in 1977 to pursue a business career. He later spent several years as an announcer for UT games.

Davis is a member of the University of Tennessee athletic Hall of Fame and the Tennessee Sports Hall of Fame. In 2009, he was named to UT's All-Century team.

Davis died at the age of 71 on September 23, 2014, at the University of Tennessee Medical Center in Knoxville, Tennessee.
