= Elston Turner =

American basketball player & coach (born 1959)

Minnesota Timberwolves
- Title: Assistant coach
- League: NBA

Personal information
- Born: June 10, 1959 (age 67) Knoxville, Tennessee, U. S.
- Listed height: 6 ft 5 in (1.96 m)
- Listed weight: 190 lb (86 kg)

Career information
- High school: Austin-East (Knoxville, Tennessee)
- College: Ole Miss (1977–1981)
- NBA draft: 1981: 2nd round, 43rd overall pick
- Drafted by: Dallas Mavericks
- Playing career: 1981–1995
- Position: Shooting guard / small forward
- Number: 33, 20, 21
- Coaching career: 1994–present

Career history

Playing
- 1981–1984: Dallas Mavericks
- 1984–1986: Denver Nuggets
- 1986–1988: Chicago Bulls
- 1988–1989: Denver Nuggets
- 1989–1990: Rockford Lightning
- 1990: Granollers
- 1990: Scavolini Pesaro
- 1990–1991: Apollon Patras
- 1992–1995: Wichita Falls Texans / Chicago Rockers

Coaching
- 1994–1995: Chicago Rockers
- 1995–1996: Quad City Thunder (assistant)
- 1996–2000: Portland Trail Blazers (assistant)
- 2000–2006: Sacramento Kings (assistant)
- 2007–2011: Houston Rockets (assistant)
- 2011–2013: Phoenix Suns (assistant)
- 2013–2016: Memphis Grizzlies (assistant)
- 2016–2019: Sacramento Kings (assistant)
- 2019–2020: Houston Rockets (assistant)
- 2021–present: Minnesota Timberwolves (assistant)

Career highlights
- Italian League champion (1990)

Career NBA statistics
- Points: 2,397 (4.7 ppg)
- Rebounds: 1,375 (2.7 rpg)
- Assists: 914 (1.7 apg)
- Stats at NBA.com
- Stats at Basketball Reference

Elston Howard Turner Sr. (born June 10, 1959) is an American former professional basketball player who is an assistant coach for the Minnesota Timberwolves of the National Basketball Association (NBA).

== Playing career ==
A 6-foot-5-inch (1.96 m) shooting guard–small forward from the University of Mississippi, leading Ole Miss to its first ever NCAA Tournament in his senior year, Turner was selected in the second round (43rd overall) of the 1981 NBA draft by the Dallas Mavericks, and played in eight NBA seasons from 1981 to 1989, for the Mavericks, the Denver Nuggets, and the Chicago Bulls. He also coached and played in the CBA—as an assistant coach for the Quad City Thunder and as a player–coach for the Chicago Rockers. He also played professionally in Europe.

== Coaching career ==
Turner later moved to the NBA, with the Sacramento Kings (six years) and the Portland Trail Blazers (four). In 2007, he rejoined Rick Adelman's staff at the Houston Rockets.

In 2008, Turner was interviewed twice for the Phoenix Suns' head coach position that became vacant when Mike D'Antoni left, but was not hired.

In 2009, Turner was interviewed for the vacant Minnesota Timberwolves head coach position. Turner, Mark Jackson, and Los Angeles Lakers assistant Kurt Rambis were the three finalists for the job, and Rambis was the Wolves' ultimate choice.

In 2010, Turner was interviewed for both the Philadelphia 76ers' and the Chicago Bulls' vacant head coaching positions. They were eventually taken by Doug Collins and Tom Thibodeau, respectively. Also in 2010, the Rockets allowed Turner to talk to the L.A. Clippers about its vacant head coaching job.

In 2011, Turner was interviewed for a defensive coordinator position for the Phoenix Suns along with the Milwaukee Bucks' coordinator Jim Boylan, the San Antonio Spurs' coordinator Don Newman, and the Golden State Warriors' coordinator Pete Myers. Turner signed a two-year contract, becoming the Suns' fifth assistant head coach, with Bill Cartwright, Dan Majerle, Igor Kokoškov, and Noel Gillespie.

In 2012, Turner was interviewed for the Portland Trail Blazers' head coach position. He, Terry Stotts, Steve Clifford, and then-interim coach Kaleb Canales were the four finalists for the job. Ultimately, Turner was not hired. In January 2013, he resigned from his position with Phoenix. In September 2013, the Memphis Grizzlies hired him as an assistant coach.

In 2016, Turner rejoined the Sacramento Kings as an assistant coach. In 2019, he returned to the Rockets as the lead assistant coach who was added to focus on running defense—former assistant Jeff Bzdelik’s role.

On August 31, 2021, Turner joined the Minnesota Timberwolves as an assistant coach.

== Personal ==
Turner is a member of Omega Psi Phi fraternity. His son, Elston Turner Jr., played guard for the University of Washington Huskies men's basketball team from 2008 to 2010. He transferred to Texas A&M University for his junior and senior seasons.

== Career statistics ==
Legend
GP	Games played	GS	Games started	MPG	Minutes per game
FG%	Field goal percentage	3P%	3-point field goal percentage	FT%	Free throw percentage
RPG	Rebounds per game	APG	Assists per game	SPG	Steals per game
BPG	Blocks per game	PPG	Points per game	**Bold**	Career high

=== NBA ===
==== Regular season ====
Year	Team	GP	GS	MPG	FG%	3P%	FT%	RPG	APG	SPG	BPG	PPG
1981–82	Dallas	80	**62**	**25.0**	.441	.000	.703	**3.8**	**2.4**	.9	.0	**8.3**
1982–83	Dallas	59	16	14.9	.403	**.667**	.667	2.6	1.5	.8	.0	3.6
1983–84	Dallas	47	1	11.4	.360	.111	**.824**	2.0	1.3	.6	.0	2.9
1984–85	Denver	**81**	2	18.4	**.466**	.167	.785	2.7	2.0	**1.2**	**.1**	5.1
1985–86	Denver	73	0	18.1	.435	.000	.736	2.8	2.3	1.0	**.1**	5.1
1986–87	Chicago	70	4	13.4	.444	.125	.742	1.6	1.5	.4	.1	3.5
1987–88	Chicago	17	0	5.8	.267	–	.500	.6	.5	.5	.0	1.0
1988–89	Denver	78	12	22.4	.428	.286	.589	3.7	1.8	**1.2**	**.1**	4.3
Career		505	97	17.8	.432	.152	.714	2.7	1.8	.9	.1	4.7

==== Playoffs ====
Year	Team	GP	GS	MPG	FG%	3P%	FT%	RPG	APG	SPG	BPG	PPG
1984	Dallas	8		6.6	.350	–	–	1.3	1.0	.8	**.1**	1.8
1985	Denver	**15**	**4**	23.9	.490	**1.000**	.632	**4.9**	**3.1**	**1.1**	**.1**	**7.6**
1986	Denver	10	0	19.6	.537	**1.000**	**.875**	2.9	2.2	.7	.0	6.6
1987	Chicago	3	0	8.3	**.800**	–	–	.7	.3	.7	.0	2.7
1988	Chicago	4	0	7.3	.167	–	–	1.3	1.5	.0	.0	.5
1989	Denver	3	0	**24.7**	.462	.000	.333	3.7	1.0	.3	.0	4.7
Career		43	4	17.1	.485	.750	.636	3.0	2.0	.8	.0	5.1
