= Coolidge Ball =

American basketball player (1951–2023)

Personal information
- Born: November 6, 1951 Indianola, Mississippi, U.S.
- Died: August 29, 2023 (aged 71) Oxford, Mississippi, U.S.
- Listed height: 6 ft 5 in (1.96 m)

Career information
- High school: Gentry (Indianola, Mississippi)
- College: Ole Miss (1971–1974)
- NBA draft: 1974: undrafted
- Playing career: 1974–1975
- Position: Forward
- Coaching career: 1975–1979

Career history

Playing
- 1974–1975: Hamilton Generals

Coaching
- 1975–1979: Northwest Mississippi CC (assistant)

Career highlights
- 2× Second-team All-SEC (1972, 1973)

Coolidge Ball (November 6, 1951 – August 29, 2023) was an American businessman and basketball player who was the first African American athlete to play any sport at the University of Mississippi (Ole Miss) in Oxford, Mississippi. He played forward for the Ole Miss Rebels. Because freshmen were not allowed to play with the varsity team back then due to National Collegiate Athletic Association (NCAA) rules, Ball played just three seasons. He enrolled in 1970 and received an athletic scholarship.

== College career ==
Ball signed scholarship papers to New Mexico State before he signed the national letter of intent to Ole Miss. He was recruited by New Mexico State assistants Rob Evans and Ed Murphy, both future Ole Miss head coaches. Ball also was recruited by then-Jackson State University head coach Paul Covington.

== After college ==
From 1979, Ball owned and operated Ball Sign Company, a business he started upon his return to Oxford after a four-year stint coaching basketball at Northwest Mississippi Community College.

== Death ==
Coolidge Ball died in Oxford, Mississippi, on August 29, 2023, at the age of 71.

== Honors ==
In 2005, Ball was part of the SEC Basketball Legends 2005 class honored at the SEC Men's Basketball Tournament at the Georgia Dome in Atlanta, Georgia. In August 2008, Ball was inducted into the Mississippi Sports Hall of Fame. Ball is also in the Ole Miss Athletic Hall of Fame.
