= T. R. Dunn =

American basketball player & coach (born 1955)

Personal information
- Born: February 1, 1955 (age 71) Birmingham, Alabama, U.S.
- Listed height: 6 ft 4 in (1.93 m)
- Listed weight: 192 lb (87 kg)

Career information
- High school: West End (Birmingham, Alabama)
- College: Alabama (1973–1977)
- NBA draft: 1977: 2nd round, 41st overall pick
- Drafted by: Portland Trail Blazers
- Playing career: 1977–1991
- Position: Shooting guard / small forward
- Number: 23, 25

Career history

Playing
- 1977–1980: Portland Trail Blazers
- 1980–1988: Denver Nuggets
- 1988–1989: Phoenix Suns
- 1989–1991: Denver Nuggets

Coaching
- 1991–1997: Charlotte Hornets (assistant)
- 1997–1998: Denver Nuggets (assistant)
- 1999: Charlotte Sting (assistant)
- 2000: Charlotte Sting
- 2001–2002: Alabama (assistant)
- 2002–2004: Denver Nuggets (assistant)
- 2004–2007: Sacramento Kings (assistant)
- 2007–2011: Houston Rockets (assistant)
- 2011–2014: Minnesota Timberwolves (assistant)
- 2014–2016: Houston Rockets (assistant)

Career highlights
- 3× NBA All-Defensive Second Team (1983–1985); Second-team All-SEC (1977); First-team Parade All-American (1973)

Career NBA statistics
- Points: 5,033 (5.1 ppg)
- Rebounds: 4,371 (4.4 rpg)
- Steal: 1,316 (1.3 spg)
- Stats at NBA.com
- Stats at Basketball Reference

Theodore Roosevelt Dunn (born February 1, 1955) is an American former professional basketball player who was most recently an assistant coach for the Houston Rockets of the National Basketball Association (NBA).

A star at the University of Alabama, Dunn played for coach CM Newton, who would start five black players in a time of racial turbulence and progress. Center Leon Douglas said, "We knew Coach Newton (signed us) because he wanted to win. He wasn't trying to be a trailblazer. You have to respect a man for putting five black starters on the court when others said it was a no-no." On December 28, 1973, in a 65–55 win over the University of Louisville Cardinals, Newton started Douglas, Charles "Boonie" Russell, Charles Cleveland, Dunn and Ray Odums for the first all-black starting line-up in SEC history, and a team that would win the SEC season title.

The 6'4" Dunn was selected by the Portland Trail Blazers in the second round of the 1977 NBA draft. He went on to have a productive 14-year career with three teams: the Blazers (1977–1980), the Denver Nuggets (1980–1988;1989–1991), and the Phoenix Suns (1988–1989). Dunn was named to the NBA's All-Defensive Second Team three times during his career, and he was widely regarded as one of the best rebounding guards of the 1980s.

After retiring in 1991 with 5,033 career points and 4,371 career rebounds, Dunn served six seasons (1991–1997) as an assistant coach for the Charlotte Hornets. He later served brief tenures as head coach of the WNBA's Charlotte Sting and as an assistant coach at the University of Alabama, and in 2004 he was hired as an assistant coach for the NBA's Sacramento Kings. In 2007, he became an assistant coach for the Houston Rockets. On December 6, 2011, he was hired as an assistant coach by the Minnesota Timberwolves to work under Rick Adelman.

== Career playing statistics ==
Legend
GP	Games played	GS	Games started	MPG	Minutes per game
FG%	Field goal percentage	3P%	3-point field goal percentage	FT%	Free throw percentage
RPG	Rebounds per game	APG	Assists per game	SPG	Steals per game
BPG	Blocks per game	PPG	Points per game	**Bold**	Career high

=== NBA ===
==== Regular season ====
Year	Team	GP	GS	MPG	FG%	3P%	FT%	RPG	APG	SPG	BPG	PPG
1977-78	Portland	63	—	12.2	.417	—	.661	2.3	0.7	0.7	0.1	3.8
1978-79	Portland	80	—	22.9	.448	—	.772	4.3	1.3	1.1	0.3	7.7
1979–80	Portland	**82**	—	22.5	.436	.000	.757	4.0	1.8	1.2	**0.4**	6.9
1980-81	Denver	**82**	—	17.4	.412	.000	.653	3.7	1.0	0.8	**0.4**	4.5
1981–82	Denver	**82**	80	30.7	**.512**	.000	.712	6.8	2.3	1.6	**0.4**	**8.2**
1982–83	Denver	**82**	80	32.2	.482	.000	.730	**7.5**	2.3	1.8	0.3	7.6
1983–84	Denver	**82**	74	**33.8**	**.512**	.000	.731	7.2	**2.9**	**2.2**	**0.4**	5.7
1984–85	Denver	81	81	28.3	.489	.000	.724	4.8	1.9	1.7	0.2	5.4
1985–86	Denver	**82**	**82**	29.3	.454	.000	.773	4.6	2.1	1.9	0.2	5.0
1986–87	Denver	81	53	23.9	.428	.000	.655	3.3	1.8	1.2	0.3	3.4
1987–88	Denver	**82**	1	18.7	.449	.000	.769	2.9	1.1	1.2	0.1	2.2
1988–89	Phoenix	34	1	9.4	.343	—	.750	1.8	0.7	0.4	0.0	1.0
1989–90	Denver	65	2	10.1	.454	.000	.667	2.1	0.7	0.6	0.1	1.8
1990-91	Denver	17	3	12.8	.447	**.250**	**.900**	2.5	1.4	0.7	0.1	3.1
Career		993	457	23.2	.457	.059	.725	4.4	1.6	1.3	0.3	5.1

==== Playoffs ====
Year	Team	GP	GS	MPG	FG%	3P%	FT%	RPG	APG	SPG	BPG	PPG
1978	Portland	10	—	8.8	.500	—	—	1.3	0.8	0.3	0.0	1.0
1979	Portland	3	—	17.3	**.686**	—	—	2.0	1.3	0.3	0.0	3.3
1980	Portland	3	—	8.0	.250	—	**1.000**	1.3	1.3	0.3	0.0	2.0
1982	Denver	3	—	27.0	.462	—	.875	6.0	**3.3**	**2.7**	0.3	6.3
1983	Denver	8	—	**37.5**	.439	—	.625	**9.8**	2.5	1.5	0.4	5.1
1984	Denver	5	—	35.6	.560	—	.714	7.8	1.6	2.0	**0.8**	**6.6**
1985	Denver	**15**	**15**	24.7	.415	—	.737	4.0	2.3	1.6	0.2	4.5
1986	Denver	10	10	27.6	.435	—	.643	5.3	1.3	1.6	0.0	4.9
1987	Denver	3	0	7.3	.250	—	—	1.0	0.8	0.3	0.3	0.7
1988	Denver	11	3	16.8	.550	—	.500	2.6	0.3	0.7	0.0	2.4
1989	Phoenix	8	0	9.9	.429	—	.500	1.9	0.1	0.6	0.0	0.9
1990	Denver	3	0	10.3	—	—	—	2.3	0.7	1.3	0.3	0.0
Career		76	28	21.5	.447	—	.691	4.2	1.4	1.3	0.2	3.5

== Head coaching record ==
Legend
Regular season	G	Games coached	W	Games won	L	Games lost	W–L %	Win–loss %
Playoffs	PG	Playoff games	PW	Playoff wins	PL	Playoff losses	PW–L %	Playoff win–loss %

=== WNBA ===
Team	Year	G	W	L	W–L%	Finish	PG	PW	PL	PW–L%	Result
Charlotte	2000	32	8	24	.250	8th in Eastern	—	—	—	—	Missed playoffs

== See also ==
- List of National Basketball Association single-game steals leaders
