= Barry Goheen =

American basketball player

Barry Goheen is a former American collegiate basketball player.

Goheen played guard for the Vanderbilt Commodores from 1985 to 1989 and is one of the most clutch college basketball players in NCAA history. He previously led a 1984 high school Marshall County basketball team to the state tournament. He won a total of nine games during his career on last-second shots.

== Career ==
Originally from Marshall County, Kentucky, Goheen was an outstanding student in high school and college. He was the 1984 and 1985 Purchase Player of the Year, as well as First-Team All-State in 1985. He led the 1984 Marshals to their first-ever appearance in the Kentucky Sweet Sixteen.

In his freshman year, during a game against Vanderbilt's arch-rival Tennessee at Memorial Gym in Nashville, Vanderbilt trailed 58–50 with only 48 seconds left. Goheen scored 7 points in the last 30 seconds, including the game-tying shot and go-ahead free throw in the waning seconds, to beat Tennessee 60–59, and was carried off the court by celebrating fans.

In the 1988 NCAA Tournament Round of 32, when Vanderbilt played heavily favored Pittsburgh, Goheen hit a 3 with 5 seconds left to make it 67–66 after Pittsburgh's Jason Matthews hit two free throws with 12 seconds left. After Charles Smith hit two free throws with 4 seconds left, he took the ball upcourt, then hit a 3 at the buzzer to force OT. Vanderbilt won 80–74.

In his junior year, Vanderbilt finished 20–11 and made it to the NCAA Sweet 16. One of his teammates was All-SEC star and future NBA player Will Perdue, who won three NBA championships with the Chicago Bulls and another with the San Antonio Spurs.

Goheen was a solid all-around player and was a 3rd-team All-SEC Selection (AP and UPI) in his senior season. In the fourth game of the season, Goheen hit a half-court shot at the buzzer to beat Louisville 65–62. That same season, Goheen hit a 3 at the buzzer to beat Georgia 76–75 after earlier in the game banking in a halfcourt shot just before the 1st half buzzer. In his senior year, Vanderbilt finished 19–14 and finished tied for 2nd in the SEC.

ESPN broadcast a half-hour special documentary summarizing Goheen's last-second game-winning shots.

Goheen is currently a practicing attorney in Atlanta, Georgia.
