= Ezra Williams =

American basketball player

Ezra Williams (born November 2, 1980) is an American basketball player. He was born in Marietta, Georgia. His height is 6'4'.

== Seasons ==
- 02–03: Georgia Bulldogs, NCAA
- 04–05: Great Lakes Storm
- 05–06: Austin Spurs
- 06–07: Mersin BBGSK, Turkey, Turkish Basketball First League
- 08–09: Austin Spurs
- 18–19: BK IMMOunited Dukes, Austria, Austrian Basketball Bundesliga
- 22: Georgia Vipers
