= Elston Turner Jr. =

American basketball player

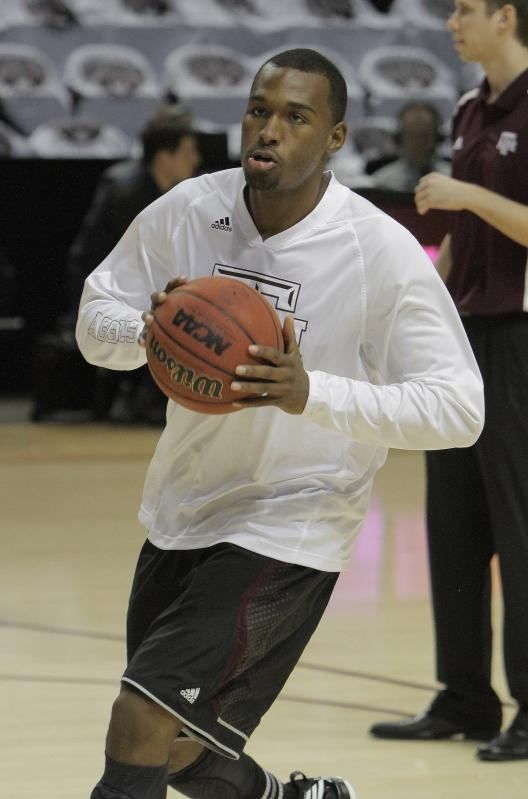
- Turner in action with Texas A&M

Free agent
- Position: Small forward / shooting guard

Personal information
- Born: March 6, 1990 (age 36) Missouri City, Texas
- Listed height: 6 ft 5 in (1.96 m)
- Listed weight: 211 lb (96 kg)

Career information
- High school: Elkins (Missouri City, Texas)
- College: Washington (2008–2010); Texas A&M (2011–2013)
- NBA draft: 2013: undrafted
- Playing career: 2013–present

Career history
- 2013–2014: VL Pesaro
- 2014: Élan Chalon
- 2014–2015: New Basket Brindisi
- 2015–2017: Vanoli Cremona
- 2017–2018: Mens Sana Siena
- 2018: Napoli Basket
- 2018–2019: Eisbären Bremerhaven
- 2020: Ifaistos Limnou
- 2020–2021: PAOK Thessaloniki
- 2021: Iraklis Thessaloniki

Career highlights
- Second-team All-SEC (2013)

Elston Howard Turner Jr. (born March 6, 1990) is an American professional basketball player who last played for Iraklis Thessaloniki of the Greek Basket League. A 6'5", 211 lbs small forward who can also play as a shooting guard, Turner played for Washington Huskies and at Texas A&M Aggies before going overseas to Europe to play for several clubs in Italy, France, Germany and Greece.

== High school ==
Turner attended Elkins High School, in Missouri City, Texas, where he played high school basketball.

== College career ==
Turner played college basketball for Washington Huskies, from 2008 to 2010 and for Texas A&M Aggies from 2011 to 2013. As a senior, he averaged 17.5 points, 3.0 rebounds, and 2.3 assists per game.

== Professional career ==
Turner started his pro career with VL Pesaro of the LBA. On July 5, 2014, he moved to Élan Chalon. He only played one game with the French club, before joining New Basket Brindisi in Italy.

From 2015 until 2017, Turner joined Vanoli Cremona. The following season, he played with Mens Sana Siena and Cuore Napoli of the Serie A2.

The next year, he joined Eisbären Bremerhaven of the Basketball Bundesliga. With Bremerhaven, he went on to average 12.7 points, 2.5 rebounds and 3.8 assists per game.

On January 7, 2020, Turner joined Ifaistos Limnou of the Greek Basket League. The following season, he joined PAOK Thessaloniki of the Greek Basket League. On August 6, 2021, Turner moved to fellow Thessaloniki club Iraklis. He averaged 3.1 points and 1.7 assists per game in eight games. On November 9, 2021, Turner and the Greek team mutually parted ways in order for him to attend to family matters in the United States.

== Personal ==
Turner's father, Elston, played guard for Ole Miss. He also played eight seasons between 1981 and 1989 in the National Basketball Association (NBA). He is currently an assistant coach for the Minnesota Timberwolves.
