= Ray Odums =

American gridiron football player (born 1951)

No. 32, 35
- Position: Defensive back

Personal information
- Born: October 30, 1951 (age 75); United States

Career information
- College: Alabama

Career history
- Winnipeg Blue Bombers (1975); Saskatchewan Roughriders (1975–1977); Calgary Stampeders (1978–1984); Memphis Showboats (1985)

Awards and highlights
- CFL All-Star: 1980, 1981, 1982

Ray Odums (born October 30, 1951) is a football player who played in the CFL and USFL. He played defensive back (DB). From 1975 to 1984 Odums was DB for the Winnipeg Blue Bombers, the Saskatchewan Roughriders, and the Calgary Stampeders. He was a CFL All-Star in 1980, 1981 and 1982. Later he played with the Memphis Showboats in the USFL in 1985. Odums played college football at the University of Alabama.

Odums also was a standout guard on the Alabama Crimson Tide basketball team and played for coach CM Newton, who would start five black players in a time of racial turbulence and progress. Center Leon Douglas said, "We knew Coach Newton (signed us) because he wanted to win. He wasn't trying to be a trailblazer. You have to respect a man for putting five black starters on the court when others said it was a no-no." On December 28, 1973, in a 65-55 win at Louisville Cardinals men's basketball, Newton started Douglas, Charles "Boonie" Russell, Charles Cleveland, T.R. Dunn and Odums for the first all-black starting line-up in SEC history, and a team that would win the SEC season title.
