= Red Stroud =

American basketball player

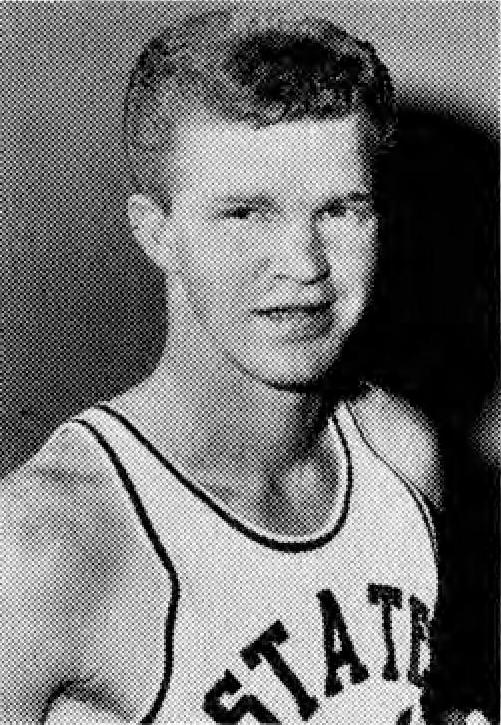
- Stroud in 1962

Personal information
- Born: May 2, 1941
- Died: March 22, 2008 (aged 66) Jackson, Mississippi
- Listed height: 6 ft 0 in (1.83 m)
- Listed weight: 160 lb (73 kg)

Career information
- High school: Forest (Forest, Mississippi)
- College: Mississippi State (1960–1963)
- NBA draft: 1963: 5th round, 44th overall pick
- Drafted by: Boston Celtics
- Position: Guard
- Number: 14

Career history
- 1967–1968: New Orleans Buccaneers

Career highlights
- 2× First-team All-SEC (1962, 1963)
- Stats at Basketball Reference

William D. "Red" Stroud (May 2, 1941 – March 22, 2008) was an American basketball player who played briefly in the original American Basketball Association (ABA).

Stroud played college basketball at Mississippi State and briefly played for the New Orleans Buccaneers of the ABA. He played seven games for the Buccaneers during the 1967–68 season, averaging 2.9 points per game. After the end of his professional career, Stroud coached high school basketball. Stroud died of leukemia on March 22, 2008.

Stroud was inducted into the Mississippi State Athletics Hall of Fame in 1989 and the Mississippi Sports Hall of Fame in 1990.
