= Ronnie McMahan =

American basketball player

Ronnie McMahan (born 1972) is a former professional American basketball player.

McMahan, a 6'5 swingman, starred McMinn County High School where he played for two years under coach Ron Baker. McMahan played college basketball at Vanderbilt University from 1992 through 1995 and finished his career there as the school's fourth all-time leading scorer, with 1,719 - the first three are Shan Foster, Matt Freije, and Phil Cox. McMahan is second to Foster for most three point baskets made for a Commodore with 296. McMahan was named an Associated Press and Coaches All-SEC Third Team in 1994 and AP and Coaches All-SEC Second Team in 1995. He earned a B.S. degree in Human and Organizational Development.

McMahan began his pro career in the United States Basketball League in the Spring of 1995 where he was named to the league's All-Rookie team as a member of Jackson Jackals. He was on the Chicago Bulls roster for the 1995–96 season until being waived on Halloween. He then played for the Chicago Rockers of the Continental Basketball Association until being waived in January. He completed his pro career in 2002-3 playing for Atomeromu SE Paks in Hungary.

McMahan became involved in high school coaching upon retirement from playing.

== Sources ==
- USBASKET
- www.secsports.com
- www.secsports.com
- USBASKET
- "Transactions". The New York Times. January 9, 1996.
