= Ronnie Williams (basketball) =

American basketball player (1962–2021)

Personal information
- Born: April 29, 1962 Queens, New York, U.S.
- Died: November 7, 2021 (aged 59) New York City, New York, U.S.
- Listed height: 6 ft 8 in (2.03 m)
- Listed weight: 240 lb (109 kg)

Career information
- High school: St. John's Military Academy (Delafield, Wisconsin)
- College: Florida (1980–1984)
- NBA draft: 1984: 2nd round, 47th overall pick
- Drafted by: Boston Celtics
- Playing career: 1984–1988
- Position: Power forward

Career history
- 1984–1985: Tampa Bay Thrillers
- 1985–1986: Pensacola Tornados
- 1986–1987: Jacksonville Jets
- 1987: Palm Beach Stingrays
- 1987–1988: Mississippi Jets
- 1988: Palm Beach Stingrays

Career highlights
- 2× AP Honorable Mention All-American (1982, 1983); 3× Second-team All-SEC (1982–1984); Third-team All-SEC (1981)
- Stats at Basketball Reference

Ronnie Williams (April 29, 1962 – November 7, 2021) was an American professional basketball player. He played college basketball for the Florida Gators. Williams played professionally in the Continental Basketball Association (CBA) and United States Basketball League (USBL).

== Early life ==
Williams attended St. John's Military Academy in Delafield, Wisconsin.

== College career ==
Williams was recruited by Florida Gators assistant coach Monte Towe, who noticed Williams at a summer league tournament in Harlem during the late-1970s.

Williams was a four-time All-Southeastern Conference (SEC) selection and led the Gators in scoring each season he played. Williams was formerly recognized as holding the Gators' records in points, field goals made, free throws made and free throws attempted until the University of Florida reinstated Vernon Maxwell's statistics in September 2025.

=== Suspension ===
Williams was suspended along with three teammates for the first month of the 1982–83 season due to a telephone fraud case. Williams, Vernon Delancy, Tony Rogers and Rodney Williams of the Florida Gators basketball team, along with Gators football player Lorenzo Hampton and sprinter Roger Dixon, were charged with making more than $1,600 in illegal telephone calls and placing them on the University Athletic Association's bill. The suspended players were required to repay the telephone company and maintain good behavior for one year.

== Professional career ==
Williams was selected by the Boston Celtics as the 47th overall pick in the 1984 NBA draft but never played in the National Basketball Association (NBA). He played in the Continental Basketball Association for the Tampa Bay Thrillers, the Pensacola Tornados and the Mississippi Jets. After his first season in the CBA he was back with the Boston Celtics for the 1985–86 preseason, but was cut in early October 1985 by Celtics coach K. C. Jones.

Williams played with the Palm Beach Stingrays of the United States Basketball League (USBL) in 1987 and in 1988. He was released after one month with the team on June 22, 1988. Williams retired from playing basketball in 1988.

== Personal life ==
After his playing career, Williams worked at a juvenile detention center in Brooklyn for over 20 years. He had six children.

== Death ==
Williams died on November 7, 2021, in New York City after a two-year struggle with brain cancer.

== Career statistics ==
Legend
GP	Games played	GS	Games started	MPG	Minutes per game
FG%	Field goal percentage	3P%	3-point field goal percentage	FT%	Free throw percentage
RPG	Rebounds per game	APG	Assists per game	SPG	Steals per game
BPG	Blocks per game	PPG	Points per game	**Bold**	Career high

=== College ===
Year	Team	GP	GS	MPG	FG%	3P%	FT%	RPG	APG	SPG	BPG	PPG
1980–81	Florida	**28**	–	35.3	.575	–	.610	**9.0**	1.2	.5	**1.0**	19.4
1981–82	Florida	27	–	**36.8**	**.597**	–	**.728**	8.2	1.3	**1.1**	.6	**21.3**
1982–83	Florida	**28**	**27**	35.9	.580	–	.723	8.8	1.5	1.0	**1.0**	18.6
1983–84	Florida	27	**27**	34.9	.586	–	.716	8.7	**1.7**	1.0	.6	16.6
Career		110	54	35.7	.585	–	.696	8.7	1.4	.9	.8	19.0
