= Glenn Hansen =

American basketball player (born 1952)

Personal information
- Born: April 21, 1952 (age 74) Devils Lake, North Dakota, U.S.
- Listed height: 6 ft 4 in (1.93 m)
- Listed weight: 205 lb (93 kg)

Career information
- High school: Grand Forks (Grand Forks, North Dakota)
- College: Utah State (1971–1972); LSU (1973–1975)
- NBA draft: 1975: 2nd round, 31st overall pick
- Drafted by: Kansas City Kings
- Playing career: 1975–1978
- Position: Shooting guard
- Number: 35, 20

Career history
- 1975–1977: Kansas City Kings
- 1977: Chicago Bulls
- 1978: Kansas City Kings

Career highlights
- 2× Second-team All-SEC (1974, 1975)
- Stats at NBA.com
- Stats at Basketball Reference

Glenn R. Hansen (born April 21, 1952) is an American former professional basketball player. He was born in Devils Lake, North Dakota.

Hansen, a 6-foot-4-inch (1.93 m) and 205 pounds (93 kg) guard, played college basketball for Louisiana State University and Utah State University. As an underclassman he was selected in the 1974 ABA Draft in the ninth round by the Kentucky Colonels, but he stayed in college. The following year, he was selected in the second round of the 1975 NBA draft by the Kansas City Kings and in the fourth round of the 1975 ABA Draft by the Memphis Sounds.

Hansen signed with the Kansas City Kings and played for them in the 1975–76 and 1976–77 NBA seasons, averaging 6.5 points per game and 2.8 rebounds per game as a rookie. He played in two games the 1977–78 NBA season with the Chicago Bulls.

== Career statistics ==
Legend
GP	Games played	GS	Games started	MPG	Minutes per game
FG%	Field goal percentage	3P%	3-point field goal percentage	FT%	Free throw percentage
RPG	Rebounds per game	APG	Assists per game	SPG	Steals per game
BPG	Blocks per game	PPG	Points per game	**Bold**	Career high

=== NBA ===
==== Regular season ====
Year	Team	GP	GS	MPG	FG%	FT%	RPG	APG	SPG	BPG	PPG
1975–76	Kansas City	**66**		**17.3**	.412	**.726**	**2.8**	**1.0**	**.7**	**.2**	**6.5**
1976–77	Kansas City	41		7.0	**.432**	.719	1.4	.6	.3	.1	3.8
1977–78	Chicago	2	0	2.0	.000	–	.0	.0	.0	.0	.0
1977–78	Kansas City	3		3.0	.000	–	.3	.3	.3	.0	.0
Career		112	0	12.9	.412	.725	2.2	.8	.5	.1	5.3
