= Charles Cleveland (basketball) =

American baseball and basketball player

Personal information
- Born: April 25, 1951 Brent, Alabama, U.S.
- Died: December 22, 2012 (aged 61) Tuscaloosa, Alabama, U.S.
- Listed height: 6 ft 5 in (1.96 m)
- Listed weight: 210 lb (95 kg)

Career information
- High school: Bibb County (Brent, Alabama)
- College: Alabama (1972–1975)
- NBA draft: 1975: 3rd round, 41st overall pick
- Drafted by: Philadelphia 76ers
- Position: Shooting guard

Career highlights
- 3x First-team All-SEC (1973–1975)
- Stats at Basketball Reference

Charles Edward Cleveland (April 25, 1951 – December 22, 2012) was an American college basketball player, known for his standout career at the University of Alabama, where he was a three-time first team all-Southeastern Conference pick and led the Crimson Tide to the program's first NCAA tournament appearance.

Cleveland was a three sport star at Bibb County High School in Brent, Alabama. He was turned down an offer to play baseball from the Cincinnati Reds to pursue basketball at the University of Alabama. He played at Alabama for coach CM Newton, who would start five black players in a time of racial turbulence and progress. Center Leon Douglas said, "We knew Coach Newton (signed us) because he wanted to win. He wasn't trying to be a trailblazer. You have to respect a man for putting five black starters on the court when others said it was a no-no." On December 28, 1973, in a 65–55 win at Louisville Cardinals men's basketball, Newton started Douglas, Charles "Boonie" Russell, Cleveland, T.R. Dunn and Ray Odums for the first all-black starting line-up in SEC history, and a team that would win the SEC season title.

For the Crimson Tide, Cleveland was a starter all three of his varsity seasons (freshmen were not eligible at this time). For his career, he became the first Alabama player in program history to be named first team all conference three times. In his senior season, Cleveland teamed with Leon Douglas and T. R. Dunn to lead the Tide to their first NCAA tournament berth. For his Alabama career, Cleveland scored 1,312 points (15.8 per game) and led the Crimson Tide to a combined 66–17 record (seventh best in the country during that period).

Following his college career, Cleveland was drafted by the Philadelphia 76ers in the third round (41st pick overall) in the 1975 NBA draft. After being one of the last cuts, he tried his hand at football, trying out for the New York Jets, but did not make the team. Cleveland later worked at his alma mater.

Charles Cleveland died on December 22, 2012.
