= B. J. Young (basketball) =

American basketball player (born 1993)

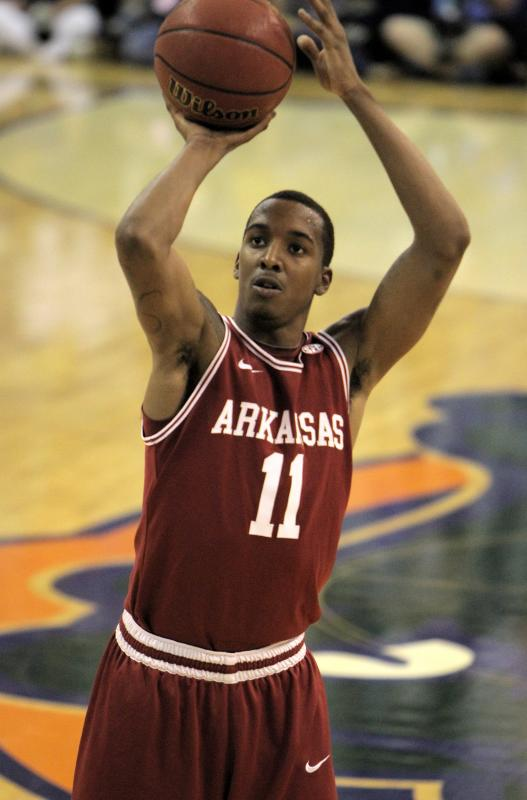

Personal information
- Born: May 26, 1993 (age 33) Florissant, Missouri,U.S.
- Listed height: 6 ft 3 in (1.91 m)
- Listed weight: 180 lb (82 kg)

Career information
- High school: McCluer North (Florissant, Missouri)
- College: Arkansas (2011–2013)
- NBA draft: 2013: undrafted
- Playing career: 2013–2021
- Position: Shooting guard

Career history
- 2013–2014: Rio Grande Valley Vipers
- 2014: Delaware 87ers
- 2014–2015: BC Batumi
- 2015–2017: Inter Bratislava
- 2017–2018: Khovd Altain Argali
- 2020–2021: Libertadores de Querétaro

Career highlights
- 2x Second-team All-SEC (2012, 2013); SEC All-Freshman Team (2012); Georgian All – Star ( All – Star Game MVP ) 2015; Slovakian All – Star 2017 ( all star game mvp )
- Stats at Basketball Reference

Bob Jean Young (born May 26, 1993) is an American former professional basketball player who last played for Libertadores de Querétaro of the Liga Nacional de Baloncesto Profesional (LNBP). He played college basketball for the University of Arkansas.

== Early life ==
During his early high school years, Young's father, Floyd Bell, struggled to succeed in real estate. His mother, Charrallotte Young, who worked in several stores at a local mall, also wasn't bringing in a comfortable wage either. As a result, Young and his family were forced to move around a lot. Once Young settled into McCluer North High School in Florissant, Missouri, a suburb of St. Louis, he was able to finally show what he could do on the court. As a senior in 2010–11, he averaged 30.9 points, 6.3 rebounds and 4.3 assists per game while leading his team to a 5A State Championship and beating Bradley Beal and his Chaminade squad in the process. He was subsequently named North County Journal Male Athlete of the Year, team MVP and All-State.

== College career ==
In his freshman season at Arkansas in 2011–12, Young earned SEC All-Freshman team honors as well as being selected in the second-team All-SEC by the league coaches. In 32 games (eight starts), he averaged 15.3 points, 3.1 rebounds, 2.3 assists and 1.2 steals in 25.2 minutes per game.

In his sophomore season in 2012–13, Young was again selected in the second-team All-SEC by the league coaches. In 31 games (25 starts), he averaged 15.2 points, 3.5 rebounds and 3.4 assists in 27.9 minutes per game.

On March 28, 2013, Young declared for the NBA draft, foregoing his final two years of college eligibility.

== Professional career ==
=== 2013–14 season ===
After going undrafted in the 2013 NBA draft, Young joined the Houston Rockets for the 2013 NBA Summer League where he averaged 11.8 points, 1.5 rebounds and 1.8 assists in four games. On July 15, 2013, he signed with the Rockets. However, he was later waived by the Rockets on October 2, 2013. On November 1, 2013, he was acquired by the Rio Grande Valley Vipers as an affiliate player. On March 6, 2014, he was traded to the Delaware 87ers in exchange for Bo Spencer.

=== 2014–15 season ===
On November 3, 2014, Young was reacquired by the Delaware 87ers. However, he was later waived by the 87ers on November 13, 2014. Four days later, he signed with BC Batumi of Georgia for the 2014–15 season.

=== 2015–16 season ===
On November 21, 2015, Young signed with BK Inter Bratislava of Slovakia.

=== 2020–21 season ===
After spending the 2017–18 season in Mongolia with Khovd Altain Argali, Young took two years off from basketball. On September 20, 2020, Young signed with Libertadores de Querétaro of the Mexican Liga Nacional de Baloncesto Profesional.
