= Leon Douglas =

American basketball player & coach (born 1954)

Personal information
- Born: August 26, 1954 (age 72) Leighton, Alabama, U.S.
- Listed height: 6 ft 10 in (2.08 m)
- Listed weight: 230 lb (104 kg)

Career information
- High school: Colbert County (Leighton, Alabama)
- College: Alabama (1972–1976)
- NBA draft: 1976: 1st round, 4th overall pick
- Drafted by: Detroit Pistons
- Playing career: 1976–1992
- Position: Center
- Number: 13

Career history

Playing
- 1976–1980: Detroit Pistons
- 1980–1982: Kansas City Kings
- 1982–1983: Carrera Venezia
- 1983–1984: CSP Limoges
- 1984–1987: Yoga Bologna
- 1987–1991: Maltinti / Kleenex Pistoia
- 1992: Pallacanestro Trieste

Coaching
- 2004–2006: Stillman College
- 2005: Magic City Court Kings
- 2006–2014: Tuskegee
- 2014–2017: Miles
- 2019–2020: Cordova HS
- 2023–present: Barbour County HS

Career highlights
- Consensus second-team All-American (1975); Second-team All-American – NABC (1976); Third-team All-American – AP, UPI (1976); First-team Parade All-American (1972)

Career NBA statistics
- Points: 3,587 (7.9 ppg)
- Rebounds: 2,954 (6.5 rpg)
- Assists: 479 (1.1 apg)
- Stats at NBA.com
- Stats at Basketball Reference
Medals
Representing United States
Men's basketball
Pan American Games
Gold medal – first place	1975 Mexico City	Team competition

Leon Douglas (born August 26, 1954) is an American basketball coach and former professional player. He played seven seasons in the National Basketball Association (NBA) before transitioning to an extensive professional career overseas in Europe. After retiring, Douglas went into coaching, leading several HBCU programs in his home state of Alabama in his career.

== Amateur career ==
Born in Leighton, Alabama, Douglas played high school basketball at Colbert County High School, and was named a Parade All-American in his 1971-72 senior year. He played collegiately at Alabama, where he was a two-time All-Southeastern Conference first-team selection and two-time SEC Player of the Year. Douglas played at Alabama for coach CM Newton, who would start five black players in a time of racial turbulence and progress. Douglas said, "We knew Coach Newton (signed us) because he wanted to win. He wasn't trying to be a trailblazer. You have to respect a man for putting five black starters on the court when others said it was a no-no." On December 28, 1973, in a 65–55 win at Louisville Cardinals men's basketball, Newton started Douglas, Charles "Boonie" Russell, Charles Cleveland, T.R. Dunn and Ray Odums for the first all-black starting line-up in SEC history, and a team that would win the SEC season title.

Douglas helped Alabama to new heights, reaching the NCAA tournament for the first time in program history in 1975, and then following up in the 1976 NCAA tournament with the program's first post-season victory, a 79–64 victory over North Carolina, with Douglas scoring 35 points. The team would lose in the next round, 74–69, to eventual national champion Indiana, and finished the season ranked 6th in polls. In his senior year, he averaged a double-double of 20.6 ppg and 12.4 rpg, and was named a third team All-American.

Douglas was also a member of the United States national basketball team that won a gold medal at the 1975 Pan American Games.

== Professional career ==
Douglas was the first Crimson Tide player to be selected in the first round of the NBA draft when he was chosen fourth overall by the Detroit Pistons in 1976. He went on to play four years (1976–1980) with the Pistons, peaking with averages of 11.4 ppg and 8.5 rpg in the 1978–79 Detroit Pistons season, backing up Hall of Famer Bob Lanier, who called Douglas, "One of the strongest men I ever played against." Douglas was plagued by a tendency to commit personal fouls with his physical style of play, finishing three seasons (1976–1979) in the top-20 of fouls committed, all while playing as a reserve. Also, relative to his draft position and the depth of the 1976 draft, the selection of Douglas would come to be viewed with some frustration as four Hall of Fame players (Adrian Dantley, Robert Parish, Alex English and Dennis Johnson) were all selected after Douglas.

He then signed as a veteran free agent with the Kansas City Kings in 1980, with Detroit receiving a compensatory pick in return, which they used to draft Kelly Tripucka in the 1981 NBA draft. Douglas played for the Kings as a reserve through the start of the 1982-83 Kansas City Kings season, when he was released, bringing his NBA career to a close. Over seven NBA seasons, Douglas averaged 7.9 ppg and 6.5 rpg.

Douglas then pursued overseas opportunities, initially with Limoges CSP in France, helping the team to win the 1983-84 LNB Pro A league title, and then in Serie A in Italy, with Fortitudo Bologna (1984–87) and then with Olimpia Basket Pistoia (1987–91) where, for two seasons (1987–1989) he paired with Joe "Jellybean" Bryant, who was raising his son Kobe Bryant. Kobe would work at the games as a ball and mop boy and would practice shooting at halftime, with Douglas sharing, "At every one of our games at halftime, it was the Kobe show. He'd get out there and get his shot up. We'd come out of the locker room at halftime and have to chase him off the court". Douglas finished his playing career with Pallacanestro Trieste in 1992.

== Coaching career ==
Douglas would return to basketball and became the head coach at Stillman College in 2004. In his first two seasons at Stillman, Douglas led the Tigers to the 2006 Southern Intercollegiate Athletic Conference (SIAC) Tournament championship and advanced to the NCAA Division II Tournament.

He also coached the semi-professional Magic City King Courts (Magic City is a nickname for Birmingham, Alabama) of the World Basketball Association for their 2005 season. The team withdrew from the WBA in 2006 and was later suspended.

Douglas then left Stillman in 2006 to become the head basketball coach at Tuskegee University. The Tuskegee Golden Tigers won three SIAC titles with Douglas at the helm and in his final season, advanced to the Elite Eight in the 2014 NCAA Division II men's basketball tournament, the furthest an SIAC school had advanced in tournament history. Douglas won the 2014 NCAA Division II Coach of the Year award, despite having been suspended for six games in the season after two players suffered heat exhaustion in pre-season workouts, and would then leave the university after a contract dispute.

After his departure from Tuskegee, Douglas was hired as the head basketball coach at Miles College in 2014. In his second season, Miles won 17 games, more than the school had won in the previous three years combined. Still, he was dismissed after his third season with an overall record of 27–57.

Douglas coached the basketball program at Cordova High School in Cordova, Alabama, starting in 2019. He was replaced by his assistant coach, Nathan Sanders, in 2020. Douglas also hosted a youth basketball clinic in his home state in 2021.

Douglas was appointed as head coach of the boys' basketball team at Barbour County High School for the 2023–24 season, and served as an assistant at Shelton State Community College for the 2025-26 season.

== Personal life ==
Douglas appeared as a member of the Detroit team in the 1979 cult basketball film The Fish That Saved Pittsburgh alongside Pistons teammates Lanier, Eric Money, John Shumate, Chris Ford, and Kevin Porter.

Douglas was inducted into the Colbert County Sports Hall of Fame in 2002 and the Alabama Sports Hall of Fame in 2006. His younger brother John Douglas played college basketball for Kansas, played two seasons in the NBA for the San Diego Clippers and then joined his brother to play in Europe.

== Career statistics ==
Legend
GP	Games played	GS	Games started	MPG	Minutes per game
FG%	Field goal percentage	3P%	3-point field goal percentage	FT%	Free throw percentage
RPG	Rebounds per game	APG	Assists per game	SPG	Steals per game
BPG	Blocks per game	PPG	Points per game	**Bold**	Career high

=== NBA ===
==== Regular season ====
Year	Team	GP	GS	MPG	FG%	3P%	FT%	RPG	APG	SPG	BPG	PPG
1976–77	Detroit	**82**		19.8	.479		.555	6.4	.8	.5	**1.0**	7.5
1977–78	Detroit	79		25.2	.481		.641	7.4	1.4	**.7**	.6	10.9
1978–79	Detroit	78		**28.4**	.490		.634	**8.5**	.9	.5	.7	**11.4**
1979–80	Detroit	70		25.5	.486	.000	**.676**	7.2	**1.7**	.4	.9	8.1
1980–81	Kansas City	79		17.2	.573	.000	.548	4.9	.9	.3	.5	6.0
1981–82	Kansas City	63	**17**	17.3	.500	–	.400	4.6	.6	.2	.6	2.7
1982–83	Kansas City	5	0	9.2	**.667**	–	.000	1.4	.0	.0	.6	.8
Career		456	17	22.2	.495	.000	.601	6.5	1.1	.5	.7	7.9

==== Playoffs ====
Year	Team	GP	MPG	FG%	3P%	FT%	RPG	APG	SPG	BPG	PPG
1977	Detroit	3	19.0	.308		.286	3.3	**1.0**	**.3**	**1.7**	**3.3**
1981	Kansas City	**15**	**21.2**	**.469**	–	**.429**	**4.3**	.7	**.3**	.2	3.0
Career		18	20.8	.422	–	.405	4.2	.8	.3	.4	3.1
