= Bruce Elder (basketball) =

American basketball player

Bruce Elder is a former all-SEC basketball forward for Vanderbilt University.

A transfer from Davidson College where he played his freshman year, Elder was named 1993 NCAA Academic All-American of the Year. He was an integral part of the regional number 3 seed Commodores which were ranked as high as number 5 and reached the sweet 16 round of the 1993 NCAA Division 1 tournament. During the regular season the team knocked off numbers 9 Louisville, 8 Arkansas, and top-ranked Kentucky during the regular season and Illinois 85–68 in the NCAAs before falling to Temple 59–67. They finished with their all-time best record of 28–6 including an SEC regular season record of 14–2.

== Sources ==
- ''Memorial Gym Rats'' page
