= Jacky Dorsey =

American basketball player

Personal information
- Born: December 18, 1954 (age 71) Atlanta, Georgia, U.S.
- Died: March 26, 2022 Houston, Texas
- Listed height: 6 ft 7 in (2.01 m)
- Listed weight: 230 lb (104 kg)

Career information
- High school: Archer (Lawrenceville, Georgia)
- College: Georgia (1974–1976)
- NBA draft: 1976: 2nd round, 26th overall pick
- Drafted by: New Orleans Jazz
- Playing career: 1976–1981
- Position: Small forward
- Number: 30, 44, 34

Career history
- 1976–1977: Hartford Downtowners
- 1977: Denver Nuggets
- 1977–1978: Brooklyn Dodgers
- 1978: Portland Trail Blazers
- 1978–1979: Houston Rockets
- 1981–1982: Maine Lumberjacks
- 1981: Seattle SuperSonics

Career highlights
- All-EBA/CBA First Team (1977, 1978, 1981); Second-team Parade All-American (1974)
- Stats at NBA.com
- Stats at Basketball Reference

Jacky Dorsey (born December 18, 1954) is an American former professional basketball player who spent three seasons in the National Basketball Association (NBA) with the Denver Nuggets (1977–78), the Portland Trail Blazers (1977–78), the Houston Rockets (1978–79), and the Seattle SuperSonics (1980–81). While in college he was listed as 6'8". He wore jersey number 44. He was drafted during the second round (26th overall) by the New Orleans Jazz from the University of Georgia. He was a nearly unstoppable shooter in Strat-O-Matic basketball.

Dorsey played in the Eastern Basketball Association (EBA) / Continental Basketball Association (CBA) for the Hartford Downtowners during the 1976–77 season, the Brooklyn Dodgers during the 1977–78 season and the Maine Lumberjacks from 1980 to 1982. He was selected to the All-EBA/CBA First Team in 1977, 1978 and 1981.

== Career statistics ==
Legend
GP	Games played	GS	Games started	MPG	Minutes per game
FG%	Field goal percentage	3P%	3-point field goal percentage	FT%	Free throw percentage
RPG	Rebounds per game	APG	Assists per game	SPG	Steals per game
BPG	Blocks per game	PPG	Points per game	**Bold**	Career high

=== NBA ===
==== Regular season ====
Year	Team	GP	MPG	FG%	3P%	FT%	RPG	APG	SPG	BPG	PPG
1977–78	Denver	7	5.3	.250		.600	2.9	.3	**.3**	**.3**	1.3
1977–78	Portland	4	**12.8**	.474		**.636**	2.5	**.8**	.0	**.3**	**6.3**
1978–79	Houston	20	5.4	**.558**		.500	1.2	.1	.1	.1	2.8
1980–81	Seattle	**29**	8.7	.286	–	.520	**3.0**	.3	**.3**	.0	1.8
Career		60	7.5	.389	–	.544	2.4	.3	.2	.1	2.4

==== Playoffs ====
Year	Team	GP	MPG	FG%	FT%	RPG	APG	SPG	BPG	PPG
1978–79	Houston	1	1.0	–	–	.0	.0	.0	.0	.0
