= 1969 ABA draft =

Basketball player selection

General information
- Sport: Basketball
- Dates: February 15, 1969 (Rounds 1–5); April 15, 1969 (Rounds 6–10)
- Location: Bloomington, Minnesota (February); Charlotte, North Carolina (April)

Overview
- 126 total selections in 10 rounds
- League: American Basketball Association
- Teams: 11 (excluding one team relocating and rebranding to another team during the draft process)
- First selection: Lew Alcindor, New York Nets

The 1969 ABA draft was the third draft done by the American Basketball Association (ABA), an upstart rivaling league to the National Basketball Association (NBA) that they would eventually merge with as a part of the NBA a number of years later. This draft began on February 15, 1969, and was held in Bloomington, Minnesota (home of both the Minnesota Pipers and the ABA's own headquarters at the time) and ended exactly two months later on April 15, 1969, with it being held in Charlotte, North Carolina (home to the future Carolina Cougars ABA franchise that came from the Houston Mavericks' prior existence), though they'd decrease the number of rounds back down to 10 rounds again similar to their inaugural draft year. Much like their first two drafts, this draft was also held as a "secret draft", with this specific draft also having an operation codename in mind called "Operation Kingfish", in which the two worst teams of the ABA by February 15 of that year, the New York Nets and Houston Mavericks (later becoming the Carolina Cougars during the April portion of that draft period), would acquire what was deemed the two best players of the draft period that year, Lew Alcindor from UCLA and Neal Walk from the University of Florida, and persuade them to join them over the two new expansion teams from the previous season, the Milwaukee Bucks and Phoenix Suns respectively, with Alcindor being the main prize in question. However, both teams would fail in acquiring the key players they deemed necessary to upgrade their quality of performance in order to effectively compete against the NBA at the time (even against the newest NBA teams created at the time), which led to ABA commissioner George Mikan effectively resigning from his position following his failure to persuade Alcindor in particular to join the Nets instead of the Bucks for new Houston Mavericks/Carolina Cougars owner Jim Gardner in an interim period before Jack Dolph (formerly of CBS Sports) took over the position in the long-term, as well as led to an ownership change for the Nets with Roy Boe taking over that team instead.of Arthur J. Brown (and Mark Binstein) and the ABA moving their headquarters from the state of Minnesota to the New York City area akin to the NBA. Despite that failure, the period afterward would also be notable for the acquisition of undrafted sophomore Spencer Haywood, which led to the Haywood v. National Basketball Association Supreme Court case years later that would help modify both the ABA & NBA's own draft systems for years to come following Haywood's brief time with the ABA's Denver Rockets. Outside of Haywood, the best draft prospect from the ABA that stayed in the league during that year would be a late round selection named Mack Calvin. This also became the last draft that the Houston Mavericks would participate in under that name, as once the 1968–69 ABA season officially concluded for the Mavericks, they would officially move eastward to the state of North Carolina to become a regional franchise called the Carolina Cougars, taking on that franchise's entire history and draft stock in the process entering the rest of that draft period in April. Not only that, but it also became the last draft done by the defending champion Oakland Oaks since they would also move out east (yet strangely compete in the West Division) to become the Washington Caps following an accidental bankruptcy threat at hand, as well as the only draft done by the Minnesota Pipers since they would return to Pittsburgh, Pennsylvania after one year out in Minnesota to once again become the Pittsburgh Pipers.

== Operation Kingfish ==
According to the at-the-time general manager of the Indiana Pacers (and later, future commissioner of the ABA), Mike Storen, the ABA could have potentially either secured their position as a permanent alternative professional basketball league to the NBA or at least force the ABA-NBA merger to happen a lot sooner than it eventually did in 1976 had their plans for "Operation Kingfish" worked out like they had intended it to. The first plan for the ABA to secure Lew Alcindor to their league instead of the NBA involved them trying to get Howard Hughes to put up $1,000,000 to sign Alcindor for the Los Angeles Stars and then allow Hughes the right to televise Stars games especially on the Hughes Television Sports Network akin to a competing fourth network to what was the big three networks of American TV at the time, but that plan ultimately went nowhere despite Hughes' #1 guy at the time, Robert Mayhew, really being a fan of the ABA's idea himself. They then followed suit by spending no more than $10,000 on research to develop a strategy on getting Alcindor to join the ABA instead of the NBA, which included noting two key points on his profile that reflected him well during this time: his self-reliance and self-confidence in himself. Alcindor later had commissioner George Mikan and the Nets' owner at the time, Arthur Brown, meet with him in New York alongside the Bucks' owners at Milwaukee Pro demanding that both teams gave him their best and only offer available to him before he made his decision (Storen wanted to also get Pacers owner Dick Tinkham involved in the meeting as well, but ultimately couldn't do so), with the initial plan in mind having the ABA offer Alcindor an instant $1,000,000 alongside a mink coat (for his mother) as a bonus for signing with the Nets while working out the finer details of his yearly salary later on in the negotiations. Unfortunately, during the only meeting the ABA did have with Alcindor, Mikan and Brown neglected to bring out the million dollar check written out to his name and the exclusion of that check made the difference between him playing for the Nets in the ABA and playing for the Bucks in the NBA (the stated offer without the check and mink coat bonus was slated to be worth $1,000,000 for four years against the Bucks' $1.4 million deal for five years). Despite later efforts made by the ABA to get a second chance with him and later even have his parents try and have him reconsider once they saw the ABA's check and offer for him, Alcindor ultimately wouldn't budge from his initial decision, which ultimately led to Mikan resigning from his position as commissioner of the ABA for James Carson Gardner briefly before Jack Dolph (a former president of CBS Sports) became their more permanent commissioner for the next few seasons and helped led to Roy Boe taking over the Nets franchise a month after the draft concluded in May 1969 (which later helped them become a successful, championship winning franchise in the ABA, even without Alcindor playing for them).

== Draftee career notes ==
For the third year in a row, the ABA and NBA would share the same #1 pick in their respective draft years. Lew Alcindor (later known as Kareem Abdul-Jabbar during his career) from UCLA was selected first overall by the New York Nets, the team near his birth home area. Much like Jimmy Walker and Elvin Hayes before him, Alcindor would decline the ABA to join the NBA instead. He would later become a six-time NBA Finals champion (one with the Bucks and five with the Showtime Lakers) with two Finals MVPs in 1971 and 1985, a six-time MVP (which is still a record for the NBA to this day), a nineteen-time All-Star, a fifteen-time All-NBA Team member (ten times a member of the first team, five times a member of the second team), an eleven-time NBA All-Defensive Team member (five times a member of the first team, six teams a member of the second team), a two-time scoring champion, a four-time block leader, a rebounding leader in 1976, and the Rookie of the Year Award alongside his first appearances in the All-Star Game, All-NBA Second Team, and All-Defensive Second Team in 1970. He was later named a member of the NBA's 35th and 75th Anniversary Teams, as well as one of the 50 Greatest Players in NBA History. He would retire with many of the NBA's all-time honors at the time, including the most blocks and points in league history at the time until those specific honors were broken by Hakeem Olajuwon in 1995 and LeBron James in 2023 respectively. As such, for his achievements, he has been an easy inductee to the Naismith Basketball Hall of Fame. The only other Hall of Fame player to have been drafted by the ABA this year as of 2025 was Bob Dandridge, who was drafted by the Kentucky Colonels in one of the later rounds of the first five rounds (likely as early as the third round), but stayed with Alcindor in the NBA to play with the Milwaukee Bucks, winning a championship in 1971 alongside the 1978 NBA Finals while playing with the Washington Bullets. The most successful ABA player to have been drafted that year, Mack Calvin, has been vouching to also get himself into the Basketball Hall of Fame as well, but he has yet to succeed in getting his name in there properly for his achievements in the ABA.

Out of 92 overall ABA All-Stars, there were six players eligible to be selected in this year's draft that made it to at least one ABA All-Star Game (notably later selection Mack Calvin, George Thompson, and Wil Jones in terms of players that got drafted to make it to at least one of these games), with Spencer Haywood, John Brisker, and Willie Wise all having notable careers despite going undrafted in this year's draft in particular. Haywood in particular would be notable for not just being an All-Star and an MVP in his only All-Star Game he played there, but he'd also be the ABA's Rookie of the Year and MVP at the same time for the 1969–70 season due to him leading the league in scoring and rebounding despite not being drafted by any team at the time of the draft due to his unique status as a sophomore at the University of Detroit. Haywood would join the Denver Rockets months after the draft ended due to the ABA granting him a hardship exception; while he only played in the ABA for one season and would cause Denver to forfeit their first round pick the following year due to his unique status, his impact on professional basketball would be long-lasting, as following his move to the NBA, the Haywood v. National Basketball Association Supreme Court case would lead to changes in both the NBA and ABA drafts allowing for teams to draft undergraduates in the event they meet the need of a "hardship" exception. Meanwhile, Willie Wise would also be the only other notable All-Star that recorded another award while with the ABA as well, as he would appear in the ABA's first two All-Defensive Teams alongside undrafted ABA rookie Fatty Taylor as two out of eight players to be a part of that team twice (excluding Artis Gilmore's appearance in all four of those teams). Finally, John Brisker would not only play in two ABA All-Star Games, but he also was one of only four players from this year's draft period to make it to at least one All-ABA Team during his career. However, Brisker also was notable for disappearing from the face of the Earth on April 11, 1978, out in Uganda following his retirement from basketball after last making contact with his girlfriend at the time before legally being declared deceased on May 29, 1985, though his death has been disputed by the State Department for decades. Outside of Spencer Haywood and Willie Wise, the only player from this draft period that would make it to the ABA All-Time Team in 1997 would be Mack Calvin, who was selected as a late draft choice by the Los Angeles Stars, yet he would tie four other players for the third-most ABA All-Star selections with five total appearances, as well as tie three other players for the most All-ABA Team appearances with four total appearances there. Interestingly enough, George Thompson would also be drafted by not just the Boston Celtics in the fifth round of the 1969 NBA draft, but also the Baltimore Colts in the 1969 NFL/AFL draft in the fifteenth round of that draft as a defensive back as well, though he ultimately stuck with the ABA instead of either the NBA or the NFL due to him being an early round selection for the Pipers franchise. Also fascinatingly enough, this year's draft also was the only year the ABA featured a player that would make it to an All-ABA Team without also making it to an ABA All-Star Game as well with Larry Cannon of the Miami Floridians making it to the All-ABA Second Team in 1971 for his incredible statistics in his second season of play while playing with the Denver Rockets, yet wasn't deemed worthy enough to be an All-Star for the ABA that year. One more player of interest involves center Tiny Ron Taylor, who would adopt the ironic nickname of Tiny to his name of Ron Taylor well after his playing career in the ABA once he started acting in TV and films from the 1980s until 2017 after a brain tumor diagnosis, becoming the second ABA draft pick to get a career in acting afterward.

== Historic draft notes ==
For the third year in a row, no generally known record of which player was taken in which draft round outside of Lew Alcindor as the #1 pick by the New York Nets and Neal Walk as the #2 pick by the Houston Mavericks (later renamed the Carolina Cougars during the second half of the draft), as well as the general notation of what the first two rounds were generally like for every team here, certain trades that were recorded at the time, the entire draft round listing of the Denver Rockets, and the additional round selections done by every team outside of the New Orleans Buccaneers (who had no extra round selections) was publicly kept throughout this year's ABA draft history as of 2025. The reason why this was the case related to the secret nature of their draft period during this year combined with the various behind-the-scenes strategies ABA teams employed at the time in order to get key players of interest to try and sign up with them over other teams instead, especially out in the rivaling NBA. However, if one were to use the records from the 1968–69 ABA season as a guide for draft ordering for at least most of the rounds in this draft, then the order from the worst to best ABA teams in this draft would be from this following order: New York Nets (which would fit the Lew Alcindor selection at #1), Houston Mavericks/Carolina Cougars (which would fit the Neal Walk selection at #2), Los Angeles Stars, Minnesota Pipers, Dallas Chaparrals, Kentucky Colonels, Miami Floridians, either the Denver Rockets or the Indiana Pacers (with the other team taking the other spot due to tiebreaker rules, though it'd probably be Denver behind Indiana due to Indiana winning the entire Eastern Division this year while Denver was in third place in the Western Division), the New Orleans Buccaneers, and Oakland Oaks. At the conclusion of their 1968–69 season, the Houston Mavericks moved eastward from Houston, Texas to the state of North Carolina (playing in the cities of Greensboro, Charlotte, and Raleigh) to become the Carolina Cougars, with the newly experimental regional franchised Cougars retaining the Mavericks' team history and assets, including draft picks, in the process of it all. After this draft period concluded in April, however, the Minnesota Pipers would move back down south to Pittsburgh, Pennsylvania to bring back the Pittsburgh Pipers name once again and the new defending champion Oakland Oaks would move eastward to Washington, D.C. to become the Washington Caps following the original Oaks' owner being saved from accidental bankruptcy by their new team owner, Earl Foreman. Mack Calvin would be the only drafted player to make it to the ABA All-Time Team in 1997, with Spencer Haywood and Willie Wise also joining that team as undrafted rookies from this draft.

== Draft ==
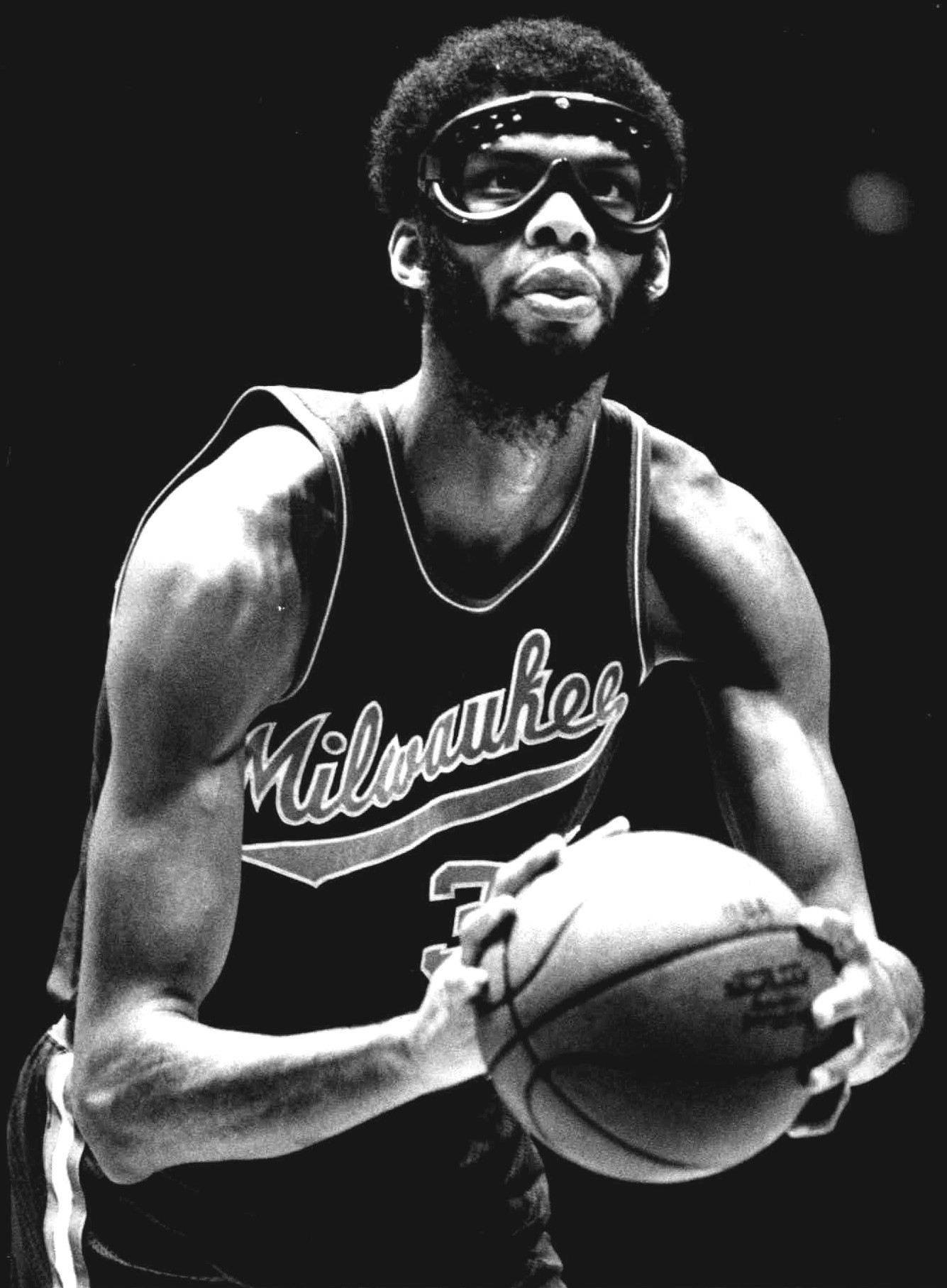
Lew Alcindor (later going by Kareem Abdul-Jabbar during his career) was selected as the first pick of the 1969 ABA Draft by the New York Nets.

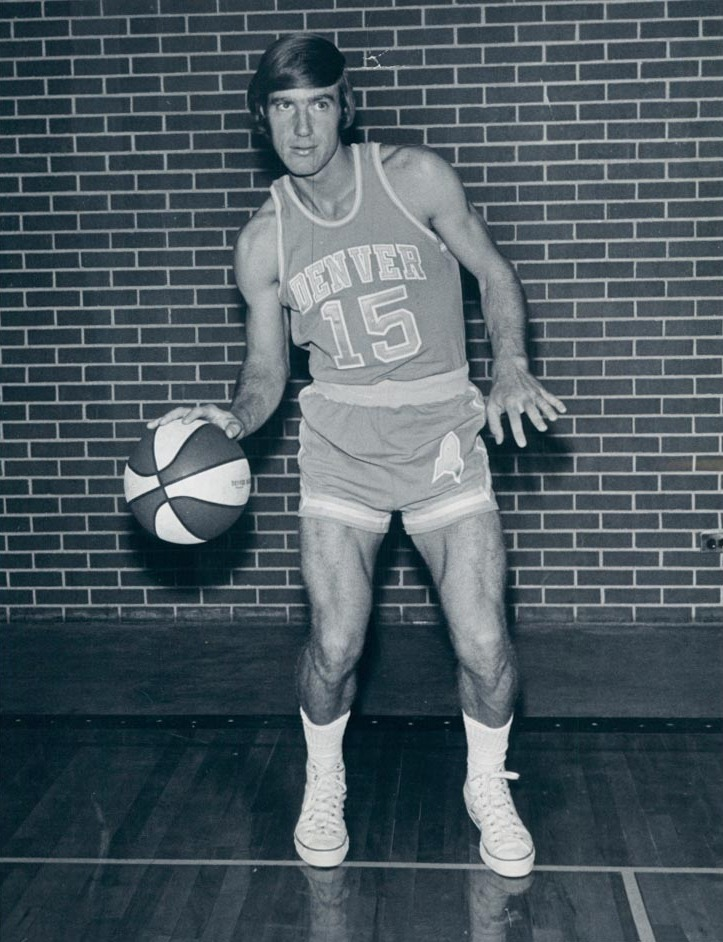
Larry Cannon was selected in the first round of the 1969 ABA Draft by the Miami Floridians via trading with the Indiana Pacers.

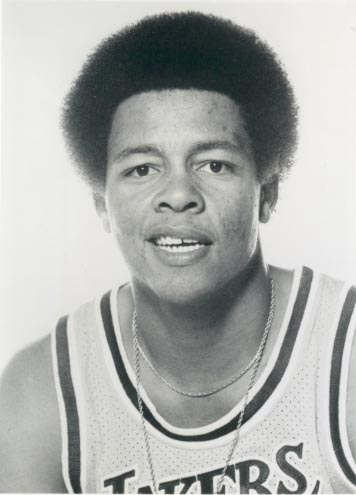
Mack Calvin was selected during one of the later rounds (potentially as early as the sixth round) of the 1969 ABA Draft by the Los Angeles Stars.

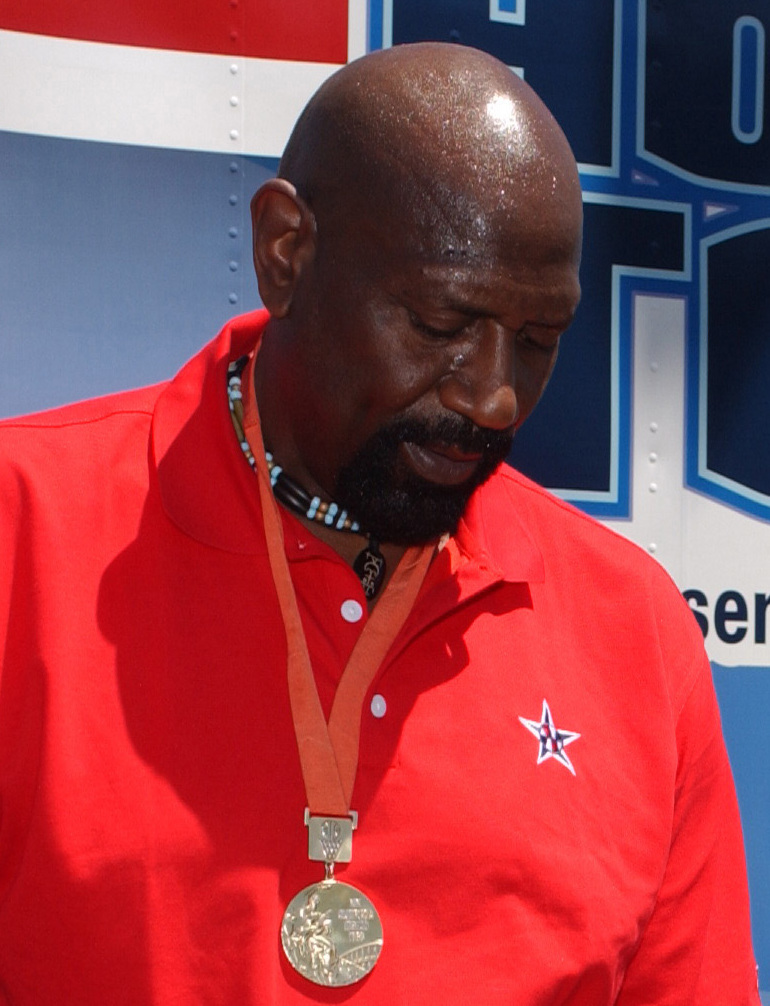
Spencer Haywood was acquired by the Denver Rockets under a "hardship exception" after the 1969 ABA Draft concluded. He would later make a long-term impact on basketball history beyond his only season with the ABA with the draft system for both the ABA and NBA in general. He would also cause the Rockets to forfeit their own first round pick in the following year's draft.

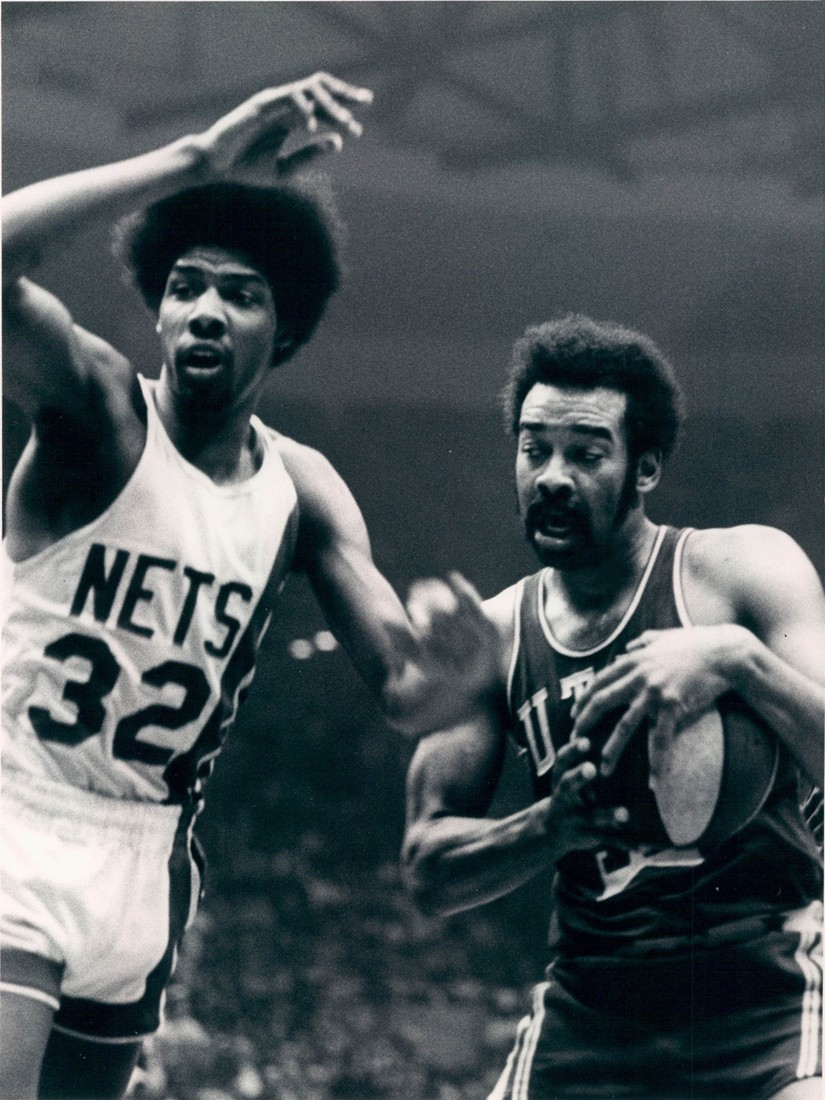
Willie Wise (right) was another undrafted player from this year's draft that would go on to have a successful ABA career after being picked up by the Los Angeles Stars after the draft period ended.

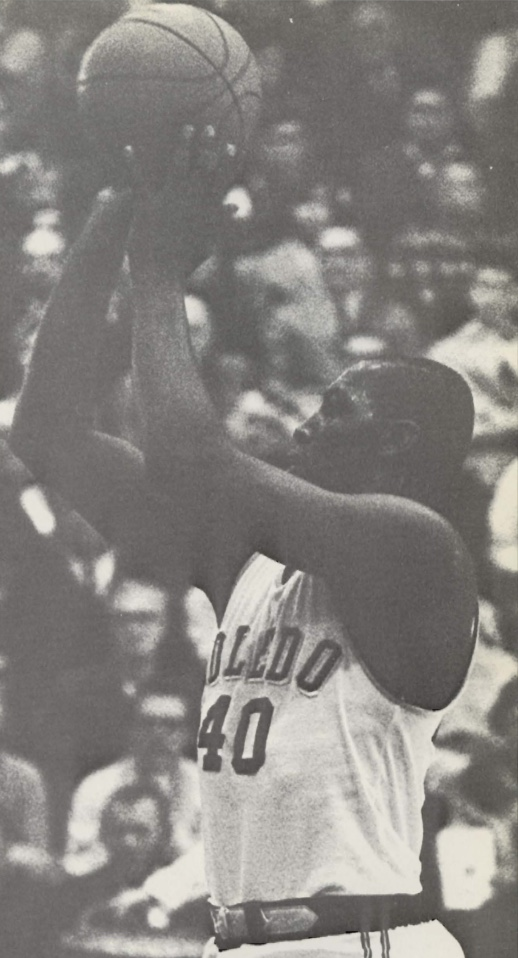
John Brisker would be another player eligible to be drafted this year that would see significant success while out in the ABA after signing with the Minnesota Pipers (who actually became the Pittsburgh Pipers once again) following the conclusion of this draft period as an undrafted prospect.

Dallas Chaparrals
First five rounds (each round is not specified here unless stated otherwise):

- #1. Tom Hagan, Vanderbilt University (Sr.)
- #2. Willie Brown, Middle Tennessee State University (Sr.)
- Bob Christian, Grambling College (Sr.) [acquired via trade with Denver]
- A. W. Holt, Jackson State College (Sr.) [acquired via trade with New York]
- Cliff Shegogg, Colorado State University (Jr.)

Extra Rounds (each round is not specified):

- Butch Beard, University of Louisville (Sr.)
- Jake Ford, Maryland State College (Jr.)
- Jud Roberts, Atlanta Baptist College (Sr.)
- Ron Sanford, University of New Mexico (Sr.)
- Willie Scott, Alabama State College/University (Sr.)
- Fred Carter, Mount St. Mary's College (Sr.)

Denver Rockets
First five rounds:

- #1. Bob Presley, University of California (Sr.)
- #2. Bob Portman, Creighton University (Sr.)
- #3. Isiah "Ike" King, Hiram Scott College (Sr.)
- #4. Greg Wittman, Western Carolina University (Sr.)
- #4. Jerry King, University of Louisville (Sr.) [acquired via trade with Dallas]
- #5. Bob Tallent, George Washington University (Sr.)

Extra Rounds:

- #6. Elnardo Webster, St. Peter's College (Sr.)
- #7. Bill Justus, University of Tennessee (Sr.)
- #8. Larry Jeffries, Trinity University (Sr.)
- #9. Harry Hall, University of Wyoming (Sr.)
- #10. Jim Healey, Rockhurst College (Sr.)
- #11. Roy Hinton Jr., Central State University (Jr.)
- #12. Al Cueto, University of Tulsa (Sr.)

Houston Mavericks / Carolina Cougars
First five rounds (each round is not specified here for the Houston Mavericks unless stated otherwise):

- #1. Neal Walk, University of Florida (Sr.)
- #2. Steve Mix, Toledo University (Sr.)
- L. C. Bowen, Bradley University (Sr.)
- Steve Kuberski, Bradley University (Jr.)
- Mel Coleman, Stout State University (Sr.)
- Bonus Pick: Jesse Price, Millikin University (Sr.) [acquired via trade]

Extra Rounds (each round is not specified for the Carolina Cougars):

- Howie Dickenman, Central Connecticut State University (Sr.)
- Gene Ford, Western Michigan University (Sr.)
- Gene Littles, High Point College (Sr.)
- Jack Stenner, University of Missouri–St. Louis (Sr.)
- Justus Thigpen, Weber State College (Sr.)
- Phil Argento, University of Kentucky (Sr.)
- Rudy Bennett, New York Institute of Technology (Sr.)

Indiana Pacers
First five rounds (each round is not specified here unless stated otherwise):

- #1. Willie McCarter, Drake University (Sr.)
- #2. Dick Grubar, University of North Carolina (Sr.)
- Tony Masiello, Canisius College (Sr.)
- Bob Arnzen, University of Notre Dame (Sr.)

Extra Rounds (each round is not specified here unless stated otherwise):

- #6. Bill DeHeer, Indiana University (Sr.)
- #7. Dave Golden, Duke University (Sr.)
- #8. Billy Keller, Purdue University (Sr.)
- Gerald McKee, Ohio University (Sr.)
- Ron Peret, Texas A&M University (Sr.)
- John Jamerson, Fairmount State College (Sr.)
- Jim Stephenson, University of Maine (Sr.)

Kentucky Colonels
First five rounds (each round is not specified here unless stated otherwise):

- #1. Dave Scholz, University of Illinois (Sr.)
- #2. Herm Gilliam, Purdue University (Sr.)
- Bob Dandridge, Norfolk Polytechnic College (Sr.)
- Mike Grosso, University of Louisville (Jr.)
- Gene Williams, Kansas State University (Sr.)

Extra Rounds (each round is not specified):

- Chris Ellis, Virginia Polytechnic Institute (Sr.)
- Dick Garrett, Southern Illinois University (Sr.)
- Willie Norwood, Alcorn A&M College (Sr.)
- Dan Sadlier, University of Dayton (Sr.)
- Bobby Washington, Eastern Kentucky University (Sr.)
- Doug Brittelle, Rutgers University (Sr.)
- Gary Major, Duquesne University (Sr.)

Los Angeles Stars
First five rounds (each round is not specified here unless stated otherwise):

- #1. Simmie Hill, West Texas State University (Sr.)
- #2. Bingo Smith, University of Tulsa (Sr.)
- #2. Ted Weirman, Washington State University (Sr.) [bonus pick acquired in trade from Denver via Dallas]
- Johnny Baum, Temple University (Sr.)
- Dennis Stewart, University of Michigan (Sr.)

Extra Rounds (each round is not specified):

- Mack Calvin, University of Southern California (Sr.)‡
- Mike Davis, Colorado State University (Sr.)
- Roger Moller, Westmar College (Sr.)
- Dan Obrovac, University of Dayton (Sr.)
- Lee Winfield, North Texas State University (Sr.)
- Vince Fritz, Oregon State University (Sr.)
- Floyd Kerr, Colorado State University (Sr.)

Miami Floridians
First five rounds (each round is not specified here unless stated otherwise):

- #1. Bill Bunting, University of North Carolina (Sr.)
- #1. Larry Cannon, La Salle College (Sr.) [bonus pick acquired via trade with Indiana back when the team was in Minnesota]
- Bob Greacen, Rutgers University (Sr.)
- Johnny Jones, Villanova University (Sr.)
- Wil Jones, Albany State College (Sr.)
- Jim Smith, Northern Illinois University (Sr.)

Extra Rounds (each round is not specified):

- Johnnie Allen, Bethune–Cookman College (Sr.)
- John Faircloth, Biscayne College (Sr.)
- Luther Green, Long Island University (Brooklyn) (Sr.)
- Larry Lewis, Saint Francis College (Sr.)
- Lynn Shackelford, UCLA (Sr.)
- Ed Szczesny, La Salle College (Sr.)

Minnesota Pipers
First three rounds:

- #1. Luther Rackley, Xavier University (Sr.)
- #2. Bob Whitmore, University of Notre Dame (Sr.)
- #3. George Thompson, Marquette University (Sr.)

Extra Rounds (each round is not specified):

- Charles Bonaparte, Norfolk Polytechnic College (Sr.)
- Charlie Hentz, Arkansas AM&N College (Sr.)
- Wilbur Kirkland, Cheyney State College (Sr.)
- Lee Lafayette, Michigan State University (Sr.)
- Kari Liimo, Brigham Young University (Sr.)
- Mike Davis, Virginia Union University (Sr.)
- Bill English, Winston-Salem State University (Sr.)
- Richard Tyler, Cheyney State College (Sr.)

New Orleans Buccaneers
First five rounds (each round is not specified here unless stated otherwise):

- #1. Franklin "Rusty" Clark, University of North Carolina (Sr.)
- #2. Skeeter Swift, East Tennessee State University (Sr.)
- John Arthurs, Tulane University (Sr.)
- Dave Nash, University of Kansas (Sr.)
- Willie Taylor, LeMoyne–Owen College (Sr.)

Extra Rounds (each round is not specified):

- Sam Little, Delta State College (Sr.)
- Charley Powell, Loyola University (New Orleans) (Sr.)
- James Wyatt, Northwestern State College of Louisiana (Sr.)

New York Nets
First five rounds (each round is not specified here unless stated otherwise):

- #1. Lew Alcindor, UCLA (Sr.)
- #2. Terry Driscoll, Boston College (Sr.)
- Rick Roberson, University of Cincinnati (Sr.)
- Ed Siudut, College of the Holy Cross (Sr.)
- Chris Thomforde, Princeton University (Sr.)
- Bonus Pick: Norm Van Lier, Saint Francis College (Sr.) [acquired via trade]

Extra Rounds (each round is not specified):

- Billy Evans, Boston College (Sr.)
- Tom Haggerty, Brandeis University (Sr.)
- Rob Washington, University of Tulsa (Sr.)
- Jeff Claypool, Grove City College (Sr.)
- Marvin Lewis, Southampton College, Long Island University (Sr.)

Oakland Oaks
First five rounds (each round is not specified here unless stated otherwise):

- #1. Jack Gillespie, Montana State University (Sr.)
- #2. Ron Taylor, University of Southern California (Sr.)
- Lamar Green, Morehead State University (Sr.)
- Don Griffin, Stanford University (Sr.)
- Eddie Mast, Temple University (Sr.)

Extra Rounds (each round is not specified):

- Bill Bowes, Elon College (Sr.)
- Joe Cromer, Temple University (Sr.)
- Lloyd Kerr, Colorado State University (Sr.)
- Ken Spain, University of Houston (Sr.)
- #10. George Tinsley, Kentucky Wesleyan College (Sr.)
- James Johnson, University of Wisconsin (Sr.)
- Ron Teixeria, College of the Holy Cross (Sr.)

=== Notable undrafted players ===
These players were officially considered draft eligible for the 1969 ABA draft and went undrafted this year, yet played at least one regular season or playoff game for the ABA before the eventual ABA-NBA merger occurred in June 1976.

Player	Pos.	Nationality	School
John Brisker*	SG/SF	United States	Toledo (Sr.)
Spencer Haywood~^‡	PF	United States	Detroit (So.)
Erv Staggs	SF	United States	Cheyney State College (Sr.)
Fatty Taylor	PG	United States	La Salle (Sr.)
Bernie Williams	PG	United States	La Salle (Sr.)
Willie Wise*‡	SF	United States	Drake (Sr.)
