= 1969 NCAA Men's Basketball All-Americans =

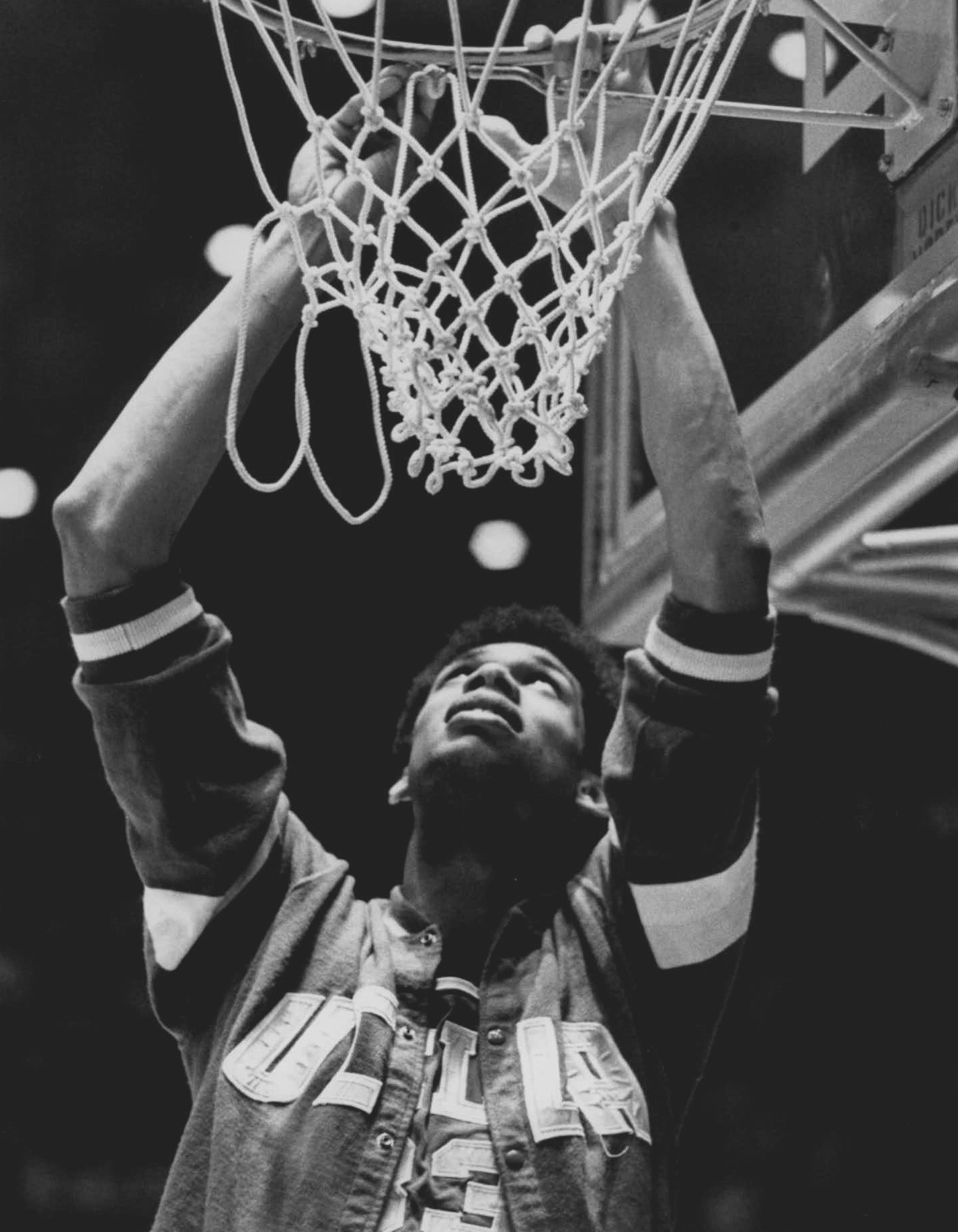
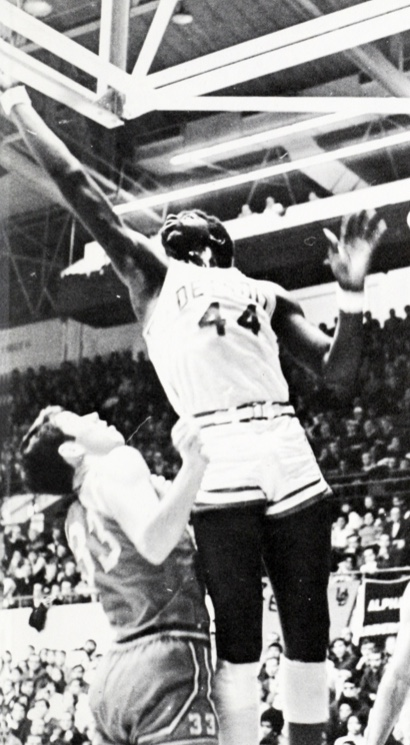
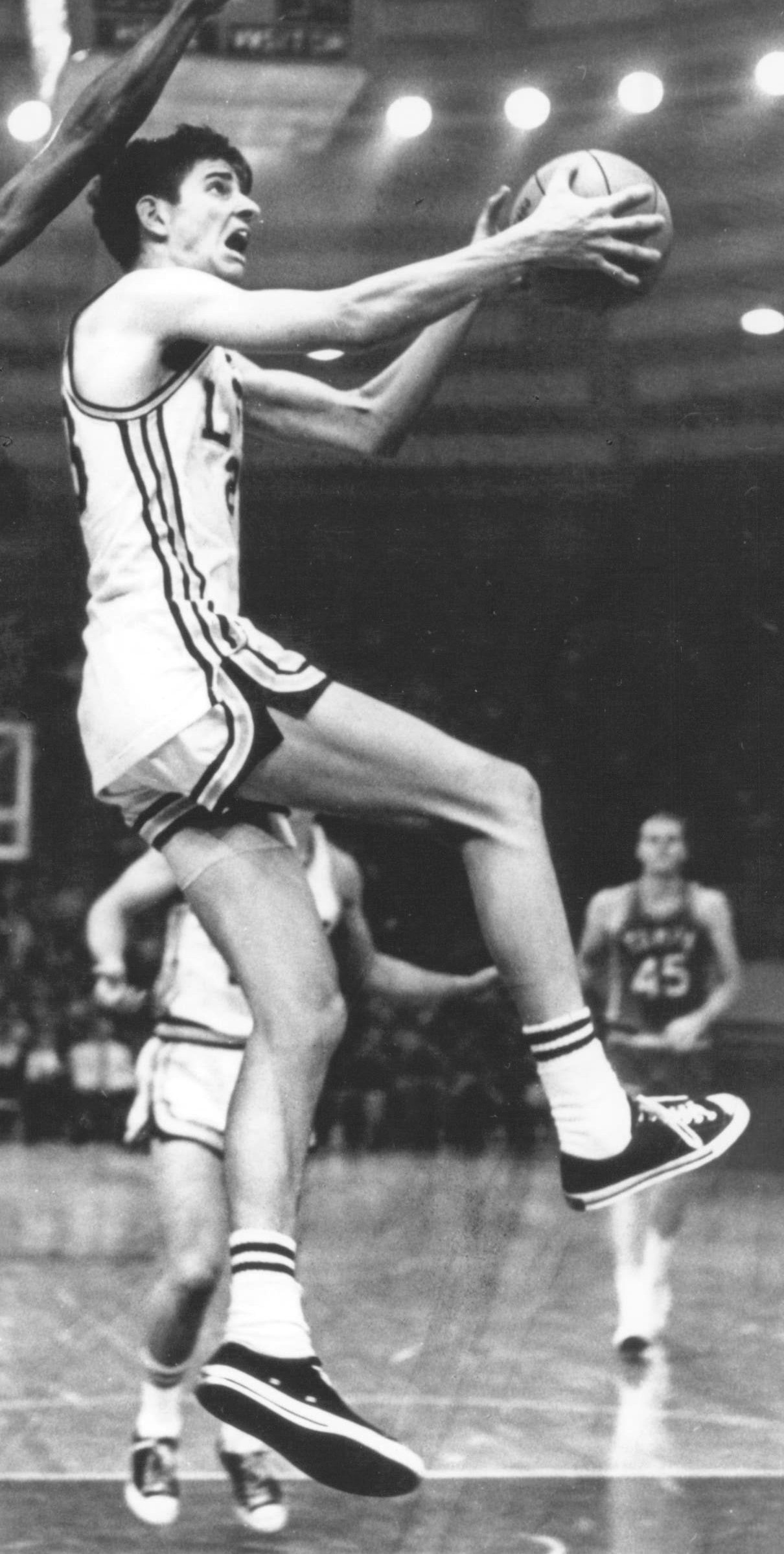
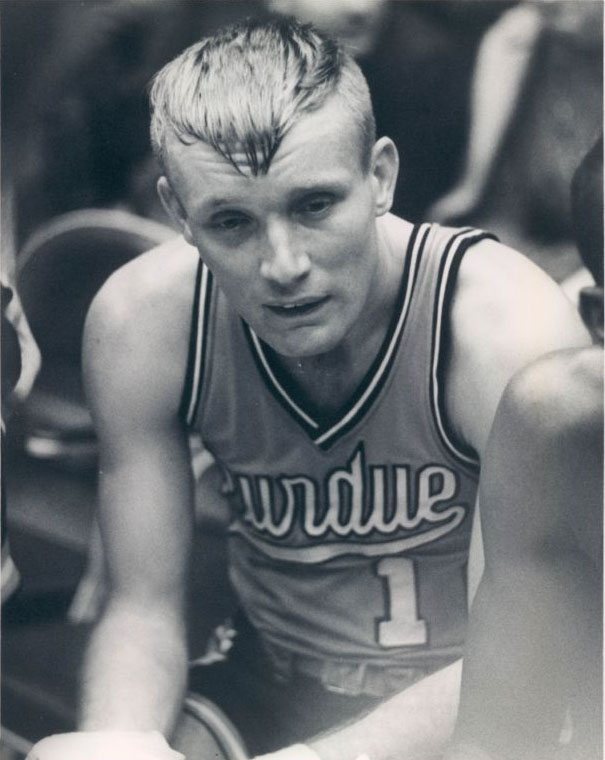
- Members of the 1968 Consensus All-America first team. Clockwise from upper left: Alcindor, Haywood, Mount and Maravich (not pictured: Murphy).
- Awarded for: 1968–69 NCAA University Division men's basketball season

The consensus 1969 College Basketball All-American team, as determined by aggregating the results of four major All-American teams. To earn "consensus" status, a player must win honors from a majority of the following teams: the Associated Press, the USBWA, The United Press International and the National Association of Basketball Coaches.

== 1969 Consensus All-America team ==
Consensus First Team
Player	Position	Class	Team
Lew Alcindor	C	Senior	UCLA
Spencer Haywood	F	Sophomore	Detroit
Pete Maravich	G/F	Junior	Louisiana State
Rick Mount	G/F	Junior	Purdue
Calvin Murphy	G	Junior	Niagara

Consensus Second Team
Player	Position	Class	Team
Dan Issel	F/C	Junior	Kentucky
Mike Maloy	F	Junior	Davidson
Bud Ogden	F	Senior	Santa Clara
Charlie Scott	F	Senior	North Carolina
Jo Jo White	G	Senior	Kansas

== Individual All-America teams ==
All-America Team
All-America Team	First team		Second team		Third team	
All-America Team	Player	School	Player	School	Player	School
Associated Press	Lew Alcindor	UCLA	Dan Issel	Kentucky	Howard Porter	Villanova
Associated Press	Spencer Haywood	Detroit	Bob Lanier	St. Bonaventure	Dave Scholz	Illinois
Associated Press	Pete Maravich	Louisiana State	Mike Maloy	Davidson	Bingo Smith	Tulsa
Associated Press	Rick Mount	Purdue	Charlie Scott	North Carolina	Dave Sorenson	Ohio State
Associated Press	Calvin Murphy	Niagara	Jo Jo White	Kansas	Neal Walk	Florida
USBWA	Lew Alcindor	UCLA	No second or third teams (10-man first team)			
USBWA	Spencer Haywood	Detroit	No second or third teams (10-man first team)			
USBWA	Dan Issel	Kentucky	No second or third teams (10-man first team)			
USBWA	Mike Maloy	Davidson	No second or third teams (10-man first team)			
USBWA	Pete Maravich	Louisiana State	No second or third teams (10-man first team)			
USBWA	Jim McMillian	Columbia	No second or third teams (10-man first team)			
USBWA	Rick Mount	Purdue	No second or third teams (10-man first team)			
USBWA	Calvin Murphy	Niagara	No second or third teams (10-man first team)			
USBWA	Bud Ogden	Santa Clara	No second or third teams (10-man first team)			
USBWA	Charlie Scott	North Carolina	No second or third teams (10-man first team)			
NABC	Lew Alcindor	UCLA	Dan Issel	Kentucky	Terry Driscoll	Boston College
NABC	Spencer Haywood	Detroit	Bob Lanier	St. Bonaventure	Mike Maloy	Davidson
NABC	Pete Maravich	Louisiana State	Jim McMillian	Columbia	Bud Ogden	Santa Clara
NABC	Rick Mount	Purdue	Calvin Murphy	Niagara	Howard Porter	Villanova
NABC	Charlie Scott	North Carolina	Jo Jo White	Kansas	Neal Walk	Florida
UPI	Lew Alcindor	UCLA	Bob Lanier	St. Bonaventure	Butch Beard	Louisville
UPI	Spencer Haywood	Detroit	Mike Maloy	Davidson	Dan Issel	Kentucky
UPI	Pete Maravich	Louisiana State	Bud Ogden	Santa Clara	Jim McMillian	Columbia
UPI	Rick Mount	Purdue	Charlie Scott	North Carolina	Howard Porter	Villanova
UPI	Calvin Murphy	Niagara	Jo Jo White	Kansas	Neal Walk	Florida

AP Honorable Mention:

- Nate Archibald, UTEP
- Bob Arnzen, Notre Dame
- Dennis Awtrey, Santa Clara
- Butch Beard, Louisville
- Bill Bunting, North Carolina
- Larry Cannon, La Salle
- Mike Casey, Kentucky
- Rusty Clark, North Carolina
- Terry Driscoll, Boston College
- Herman Gilliam, Purdue
- Tom Hagan, Vanderbilt
- Simmie Hill, West Texas A&M
- Johnny Jones, Villanova
- Bill Justus, Tennessee
- Sam Lacey, New Mexico State
- Lee Lafayette, Michigan State
- Bob Lienhard, Georgia
- Tommy Little, Seattle
- Willie McCarter, Drake
- Jim McDaniels, Western Kentucky
- Jim McMillian, Columbia
- Cliff Meely, Colorado
- Steve Mix, Toledo
- Rex Morgan, Jacksonville
- Bud Ogden, Santa Clara
- Geoff Petrie, Princeton
- Bob Portman, Creighton
- Marv Roberts, Utah State
- John Roche, South Carolina
- Curtis Rowe, UCLA
- Lynn Shackelford, UCLA
- Ed Siudut, Holy Cross
- Ken Spain, Houston
- Harley Swift, East Tennessee State
- Bob Tallent, George Washington
- George Thompson, Marquette
- Rudy Tomjanovich, Michigan
- Rich Travis, Oklahoma City
- John Warren, St. John's
- Elnardo Webster, Saint Peter's

== See also ==
- 1968–69 NCAA University Division men's basketball season
