= List of NBA players (G) =

This is a list of National Basketball Association players whose last names begin with G.

The list also includes players from the American National Basketball League (NBL), the Basketball Association of America (BAA), and the original American Basketball Association (ABA). All of these leagues contributed to the formation of the present-day NBA.

Individuals who played in the NBL prior to its 1949 merger with the BAA are listed in italics, as they are not traditionally listed in the NBA's official player registers.

== G ==
- Dan Gadzuric
- Daniel Gafford
- Deng Gai
- Elmer Gainer
- Bill Gaines
- Corey Gaines
- David Gaines
- Reece Gaines
- Sundiata Gaines
- Laddie Gale
- Mike Gale
- Chad Gallagher
- Harry Gallatin
- Danilo Gallinari
- Langston Galloway
- Lowell Galloway
- Dave Gambee
- Kevin Gamble
- Fred Gantt
- Bob Gantt
- Jorge Garbajosa
- Rubén Garcés
- Alex Garcia
- Andersson Garcia
- Francisco García
- Frank Garcia
- Ben Gardner
- Chuck Gardner
- Earl Gardner
- Ken Gardner
- Myron Gardner
- Thomas Gardner
- Vern Gardner
- Jack Garfinkel
- Patricio Garino
- Darius Garland
- Gary Garland
- Winston Garland
- Dick Garmaker
- Bill Garner
- Chris Garner
- Bill Garnett
- Kevin Garnett
- Marlon Garnett
- Billy Garrett Jr.
- Calvin Garrett
- Dean Garrett
- Diante Garrett
- Dick Garrett
- Marcus Garrett
- Rowland Garrett
- Tom Garrick
- John Garris
- Kiwane Garris
- Pat Garrity
- Usman Garuba
- James Garvin
- Luka Garza
- Marc Gasol
- Pau Gasol
- Frank Gates
- Kaiser Gates
- Pop Gates
- Chris Gatling
- Kenny Gattison
- Bob Gauchat
- Rudy Gay
- Ed Gayda
- Andrew Gaze
- Michael Gbinije
- Reggie Geary
- Alonzo Gee
- Johnny Gee
- Matt Geiger
- Mickaël Gelabale
- Hal Gensichen
- Devean George
- Jack George
- Keyonte George
- Kyshawn George
- Paul George
- Tate George
- Marcus Georges-Hunt
- Gus Gerard
- Bob Gerber
- Derrick Gervin
- George Gervin
- Gorham Getchell
- John Gianelli
- Dick Gibbs
- Jim Gibbs
- John Gibbs
- Daniel Gibson
- Dee Gibson
- Hoot Gibson
- Jonathan Gibson
- Mel Gibson
- Mike Gibson
- Taj Gibson
- J. R. Giddens
- Josh Giddey
- Keshon Gilbert
- Boody Gilbertson
- Trey Gilder
- Harry Giles
- Shai Gilgeous-Alexander
- Frankie Gilhooley
- Anthony Gill
- Eddie Gill
- Kendall Gill
- Ben Gillery
- Collin Gillespie
- Freddie Gillespie
- Jack Gillespie
- Ja'Kobi Gillespie
- Gene Gillette
- Armen Gilliam
- Herm Gilliam
- Artis Gilmore
- Walt Gilmore
- Chuck Gilmur
- Jacob Gilyard
- Manu Ginóbili
- Hymie Ginsburg
- Gordan Giriček
- Jack Givens
- Mickell Gladness
- George Glamack
- Ed Glancy
- Gerald Glass
- Jim Glass
- Mike Glenn
- Normie Glick
- Georgi Glouchkov
- Clarence Glover
- Dion Glover
- Andreas Glyniadakis
- Mike Gminski
- Rudy Gobert
- Dan Godfread
- Pim Goff
- Tom Gola
- Ben Goldfaden
- Vladislav Goldin
- Jackie Goldsmith
- Anthony Goldwire
- Ryan Gomes
- Glen Gondrezick
- Grant Gondrezick
- Hugo González
- Drew Gooden
- Gail Goodrich
- Steve Goodrich
- Archie Goodwin
- Brandon Goodwin
- Jordan Goodwin
- Pop Goodwin
- Aaron Gordon
- Ben Gordon
- Drew Gordon
- Eric Gordon
- Lancaster Gordon
- Paul Gordon
- Marcin Gortat
- Jazian Gortman
- Leo Gottlieb
- Andrew Goudelock
- Gerald Govan
- Bato Govedarica
- Joe Graboski
- Ricky Grace
- Erwin Graf
- Fred Grafft
- Cal Graham
- Devonte' Graham
- Greg Graham
- Joey Graham
- Mal Graham
- Orlando Graham
- Otto Graham
- Paul Graham
- Stephen Graham
- Treveon Graham
- Jim Grandholm
- Ronnie Grandison
- Danny Granger
- Stewart Granger
- Brian Grant
- Bud Grant
- Gary Grant
- Greg Grant
- Harvey Grant
- Horace Grant
- Jerami Grant
- Jerian Grant
- Josh Grant
- Paul Grant
- Travis Grant
- Donte Grantham
- Don Grate
- Walter Grauman
- Allen Graves
- Butch Graves
- Hassani Gravett
- Aaron Gray
- Cortez Gray
- Devin Gray
- Ed Gray
- Evric Gray
- Gary Gray
- Hayden Gray
- Josh Gray
- Leonard Gray
- RaiQuan Gray
- Stuart Gray
- Sylvester Gray
- Wyndol Gray
- Jeff Grayer
- Bob Greacen
- A.C. Green
- A. J. Green
- Danny Green
- Devin Green
- Draymond Green
- Erick Green
- Gerald Green
- Jalen Green
- JaMychal Green
- Javonte Green
- Jeff Green
- Johnny Green
- Josh Green
- Ken Green
- Kenny Green
- Lamar Green
- Litterial Green
- Luther Green
- Mike Green
- Rickey Green
- Sean Green
- Sidney Green
- Sihugo Green
- Steve Green
- Taurean Green
- Tommie Green
- Willie Green
- Donté Greene
- Orien Greene
- Jerry Greenspan
- David Greenwood
- Hal Greer
- Lynn Greer
- Gary Gregor
- Claude Gregory
- John Greig
- Norm Grekin
- Al Grenert
- Kevin Grevey
- Dennis Grey
- AJ Griffin
- Adrian Griffin
- Blake Griffin
- Eddie Griffin
- Greg Griffin
- Paul Griffin
- Taylor Griffin
- Darrell Griffith
- Ken Griffith
- Chuck Grigsby
- Quentin Grimes
- Derek Grimm
- George Grimshaw
- Dick Groat
- Bob Gross
- Mike Grosso
- Art Grove
- Alex Groza
- Dick Grubar
- Anthony Grundy
- Ace Gruenig
- Ernie Grunfeld
- Nick Grunzweig
- Gene Guarilia
- Marko Gudurić
- Pétur Guðmundsson
- Richie Guerin
- Mouhamadou Gueye
- Mouhamed Gueye
- Tom Gugliotta
- Andres Guibert
- Jay Guidinger
- Ken Gunning
- Coulby Gunther
- Dave Gunther
- Al Guokas
- Matt Guokas Sr.
- Matt Guokas
- Jorge Gutiérrez
- Kyle Guy
- A. J. Guyton
