= James Glass =

James, Jim, or Jimmy Glass may refer to:

- James Glass (born 1961), Tristanian politician
- Jim Glass (1919–1972), American basketball player
- Jimmy Glass (born 1973), English footballer
