= Larry Bergh =

American basketball player (born 1942)

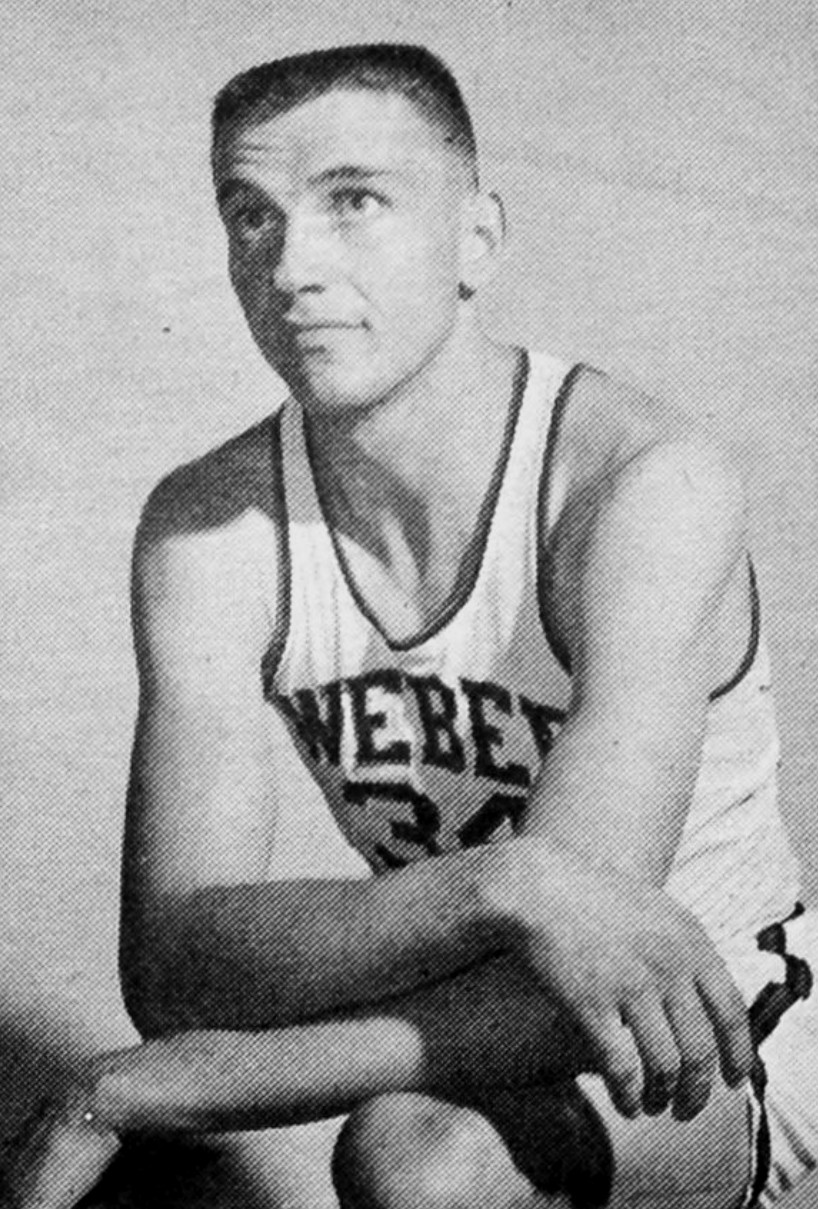

Personal information
- Born: April 2, 1942 (age 84) Williston, North Dakota, U.S.
- Listed height: 6 ft 8 in (2.03 m)
- Listed weight: 210 lb (95 kg)

Career information
- High school: Desales (Walla Walla, Washington)
- College: Weber State (1966–1969)
- NBA draft: 1969: 11th round, 146th overall pick
- Drafted by: Chicago Bulls
- Position: Power forward
- Number: 15

Career history
- 1969–1970: Pittsburgh Pipers
- 1970–1972: Allentown Jets

Career highlights
- All-EBA First Team (1971)
- Stats at Basketball Reference

Larry Clifford Bergh (born April 2, 1942) is an American former professional basketball player.

== Early life ==
He was raised in Trenton, North Dakota, a Native American community. He is the son of a Native American mother, Selina (née Falcon) (1909–1996), and a Norwegian father, Orris Bergh (1905–1982). The family then moved to Walla Walla, Washington in the late 1950s.

== Career ==
A 6'8" forward from Weber State University, Bergh was selected by the Chicago Bulls in the eleventh round of the 1969 NBA draft. He never played with the Bulls, however, joining instead the Pittsburgh Pipers of the American Basketball Association. In 20 games with the Pipers, Bergh averaged 6.1 points and 4.3 rebounds. He played for the Allentown Jets of the Eastern Basketball Association from 1970 to 1972. Bergh was selected to the All-EBA First Team in 1971.

Bergh later became known as a softball player.

== Personal life ==
A father of four and grandfather of five, he lives in Tennessee with his wife, Pat.
