= Gene Littles =

American basketball player and coach (1943–2021)

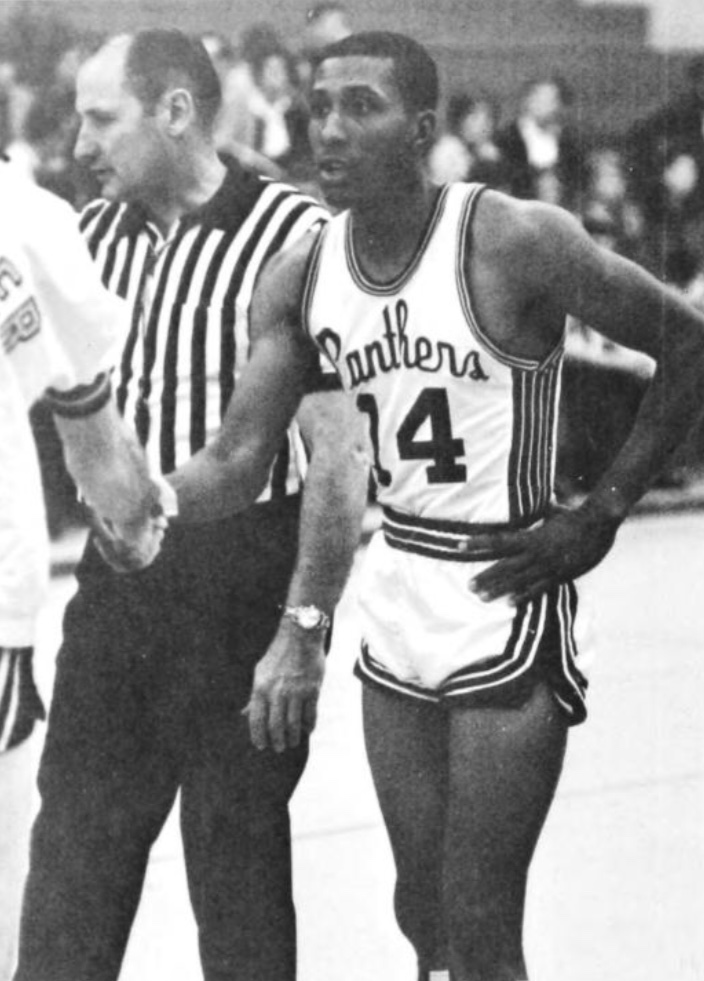
- Littles with the High Point Panthers in 1968

Personal information
- Born: June 29, 1943 Washington, D.C., U.S.
- Died: September 10, 2021 (aged 78) Scottsdale, Arizona, U.S.
- Listed height: 6 ft 0 in (1.83 m)
- Listed weight: 160 lb (73 kg)

Career information
- High school: McKinley (Washington, D.C.)
- College: High Point (1965–1969)
- NBA draft: 1969: 5th round, 68th overall pick
- Drafted by: New York Knicks
- Playing career: 1969–1975
- Position: Point guard
- Number: 23
- Coaching career: 1975–1997

Career history

Playing
- 1969–1974: Carolina Cougars
- 1974–1975: Kentucky Colonels

Coaching
- 1975–1977: Appalachian State (assistant)
- 1977–1979: North Carolina A&T
- 1979–1982: Utah Jazz (assistant)
- 1982–1986: Cleveland Cavaliers (assistant)
- 1986: Cleveland Cavaliers (interim)
- 1986–1987: Chicago Bulls (assistant)
- 1988–1990: Charlotte Hornets (assistant)
- 1990–1991: Charlotte Hornets
- 1992–1997: Denver Nuggets (assistant)
- 1995: Denver Nuggets (interim)

Career highlights
- As player: ABA champion (1975); As coach: 2× MEAC regular season champion (1978, 1979); 2× MEAC tournament champion (1978, 1979)

Career ABA playing statistics
- Points: 4,066 (9.0 ppg)
- Rebounds: 1,475 (3.3 rpg)
- Assists: 1,336 (3.0 spg)
- Stats at Basketball Reference

Career coaching record
- NBA: 44–111 (.284)
- NCAA: 40–15 (.727)
- Record at Basketball Reference

Eugene Scape Littles (June 29, 1943 – September 10, 2021) was an American basketball player and coach. He played six seasons in the American Basketball Association (ABA) for the Carolina Cougars and Kentucky Colonels between 1969 and 1975. Littles won an ABA championship with the Colonels in 1975. He later coached in the National Basketball Association (NBA) with the Cleveland Cavaliers, Charlotte Hornets, and Denver Nuggets.

== Early life ==
Littles was born in Washington, D.C., on June 29, 1943. He attended McKinley Technology High School in his hometown. He went on to play college basketball at High Point University, where he is the all-time leading scorer in High Point school history, and a three-time NAIA All-American. Littles was selected in the 5th round of the 1969 NBA draft by the New York Knicks and in the 1969 ABA draft by the Dallas Chaparrals. He opted to play in the ABA. His playing rights were later acquired by the Carolina Cougars.

== Professional career ==
Littles made his ABA debut on October 18, 1969, scoring ten points against the Chaparrals. He played for five seasons with the Cougars from 1969 to 1974. He was named to the All-Rookie Team in 1970. He finished sixth in the league in field goal percentage (.507) that year, while recording career-highs in points (1,025), assists (282), and rebounds (415). Littles led the ABA in games played in 1972–73 with 84. He later played for one season (1974–75) with the Kentucky Colonels. He was a member of the Colonels team that won the 1975 ABA Championship. However, he had career-lows in games played (61), minutes played (900), points (215), assists (119), and rebounds (86) in his final regular season.

== Coaching career ==
Littles began his coaching career in 1975 as an assistant coach for the Appalachian State Mountaineers, where he coached for two seasons. He was then a college head coach at North Carolina A&T from 1977 to 1979, leading the team to two straight MEAC tournament championships. He was also honored as the conference's coach of the year in 1979.

Littles got his first taste of NBA coaching when he was hired by the then-New Orleans Jazz in 1979 and moved with the team to Utah. He then moved over to the Cleveland Cavaliers in 1982 and was subsequently given the interim head coaching job when George Karl was dismissed before the end of the 1985–86 season. However, the Cavaliers did not retain him and instead hired Lenny Wilkens the following season.

Littles was an assistant coach of the Chicago Bulls in 1986–87, before serving in that capacity with the Charlotte Hornets for two seasons. He later received a second opportunity as NBA head coach with the Hornets, replacing Dick Harter in February 1990. He lasted a season and a half with the recent-expansion Hornets, until he was replaced with Allan Bristow at the end of the 1990–91 season. Littles then briefly served as a vice president of the Hornets and special assistant to club president.

Littles returned to coaching in 1992–93 as an assistant with the Denver Nuggets. He was one of the candidates interviewed at the end of the season to be head coach of the Los Angeles Clippers; however, the position ultimately went to Bob Weiss. Littles later became the Nuggets interim coach during the 1994–95 season, in between Dan Issel and Bernie Bickerstaff.

== Later life ==
Littles was inducted into the North Carolina Sports Hall of Fame and the High Point University Athletics Hall of Fame. His number 14 was retired by his alma mater, and a bench outside Millis Athletic Convocation Center was later named in his honor in 2019.

Littles died on September 10, 2021, at the age of 78.

== Head coaching record ==
Legend
Regular season	G	Games coached	W	Games won	L	Games lost	W–L %	Win–loss %
Playoffs	PG	Playoff games	PW	Playoff wins	PL	Playoff losses	PW–L %	Playoff win–loss %

Team	Year	G	W	L	W–L%	Finish	PG	PW	PL	PW–L%	Result
Cleveland	1985–86	15	4	11	.267	5th in Central	—	—	—	—	Missed playoffs
Charlotte	1989–90	42	11	31	.262	7th in Midwest	—	—	—	—	Missed playoffs
Charlotte	1990–91	82	26	56	.317	7th in Central	—	—	—	—	Missed playoffs
Denver	1994–95	16	3	13	.188	(interim)	—	—	—	—	—
Career		155	44	111	.284		—	—	—	—	
