= Ron Sanford =

American basketball player (1946–2026)

Personal information
- Born: June 11, 1946 New York City, U.S.
- Died: June 22, 2026 (aged 80) Södermalm, Stockholm, Sweden
- Listed height: 6 ft 9 in (2.06 m)
- Listed weight: 215 lb (98 kg)

Career information
- High school: Wingate (Brooklyn, New York)
- College: Fort Dodge JC (1965–1966); New Mexico (1966–1969)
- NBA draft: 1969: 4th round, 51st overall pick
- Drafted by: Cincinnati Royals
- Playing career: 1969–1979
- Position: Center / power forward
- Number: 15

Career history
- 1969–1970: Noalex Venezia
- 1971: Dallas Chaparrals
- 1971–1972: Caen BC
- 1973–1975: Pregassona
- 1975–1978: Lugano
- 1978–1979: Pully
- Stats at Basketball Reference

Ronald Richard Sanford (June 11, 1946 – June 22, 2026) was an American professional basketball player. The 6 ft 9 in (206 cm), 215 lb (98 kg) post player was described as not intimidating but a smooth and active player who could score.

After playing collegiately for New Mexico, he played in the ABA for the Dallas Chaparrals in 1971, spending the near entirety of his career in Europe (particularly in Switzerland).

== College career ==
Sanford played for Wingate High in his home town of Brooklyn, New York.

He next played college basketball from 1966 for New Mexico, in the Western Athletic Conference (WAC) of the NCAA University Division. In his first year as a sophomore, (Note: Freshmen were ineligible until 1972) he had 6.6 points and 4.2 rebounds per game, as the team's fifth best scorer.

As a junior, he increased his averages to 15.6 points and 9.1 rebounds, as he earned Second team All-WAC honours, having helped the Lobos win the conference. However, as New Mexico's second-best scorer and rebounder (trailing only Ron Nelson in scoring), he injured his knee right before the NCAA Tournament, the first ever played by New Mexico. Playing in diminished form, he had only 8 points (on 3-for-9 shooting) and 3 rebounds before fouling out, as the Lobos were bested 73–86 by Santa Clara in their own arena The Pit. He was on better form the next day during the consolation game against New Mexico State, posting 23 points (with a still-record 11 field goals made) and 8 rebounds, though it was again in a losing effort that saw the Lobos finish fourth in the regional qualifier.

His senior season saw him post 13.4 points (behind only Greg Howard) and 8.8 rebounds per game, the latter a team-best, in a team that entered the season with high expectations but finished last of the WAC.

Sanford finished his New Mexico career with 942 points (11.9 per game), whilst his 582 rebounds (7.4 per game) are the seventeenth all-time best for the school as of the 2014–15 season.

== Professional career ==
Sanford was selected in the fourth round of the 1969 NBA draft (51st pick overall) by the Cincinnati Royals. He did not play for the Royals, spending the 1969–70 season in the Italian Serie A with Noalex Venezia, finishing as the league's fifth-best scorer with 516 points (23.5 per game), in addition to 309 rebounds over 22 games (14 per game).

Following the season, he was drafted anew, by the Los Angeles Lakers in the fourteenth round (212th pick) of the 1970 NBA draft but again did not sign for the team. In June 1970, he toured Italy, playing friendlies as part of a Trans World Airlines squad.

Drafted by the Dallas Chaparrals in the 1969 American Basketball Association Draft (ninth round), he signed with the team prior to the start of the 1971–72 ABA season. He played one game, posting less than two minutes in a stateless performance against the Virginia Squires on 21 October 1971. It proved to be his solitary game for the Chaparrals as he was waived by the club on 13 November 1971 to make space for Simmie Hill's signing. He finished the season with French side Caen Basket Club.

He later moved to the Swiss Ligue Nationale, playing for Pregassona from 1973, before turning up for Lugano and Pully.

== Personal life and death ==
Sanford and former Lobos teammate Greg Howard were arrested on June 20, 1972 by federal narcotics agents on charges related to cocaine possession and trafficking. The charges against Sanford were later dismissed by the federal government.

Sanford later split his time between Plano, Texas and Stockholm, Sweden with his wife, Jannie. He died in Stockholm on June 22, 2026, at the age of 80.
