= John Brisker =

American basketball player

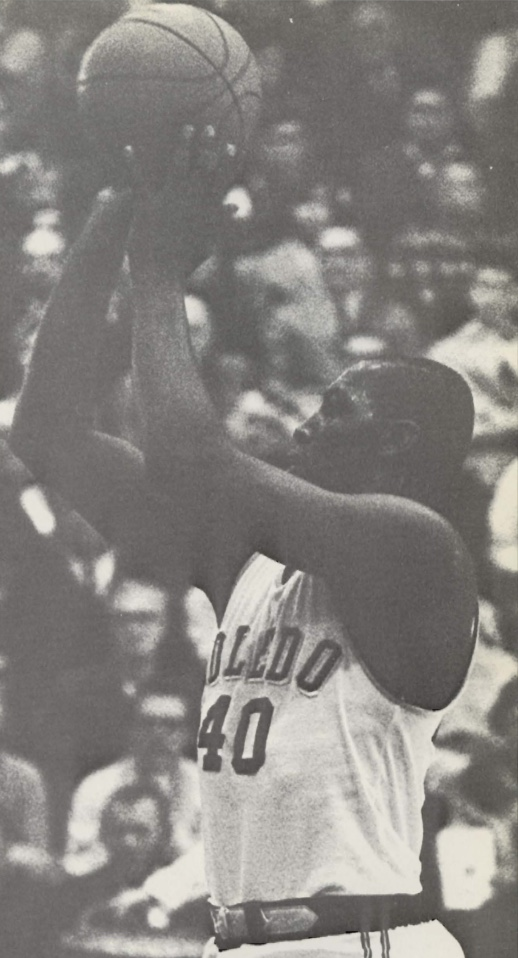
- Born: June 15, 1947; Detroit, Michigan, U.S.
- Disappeared: April 11, 1978 (aged 30); Uganda
- Status: Declared dead May 29, 1985 (aged 37)
- Basketball career

Personal information
- Listed height: 6 ft 5 in (1.96 m)
- Listed weight: 210 lb (95 kg)

Career information
- High school: Hamtramck (Hamtramck, Michigan)
- College: Toledo (1966–1968)
- NBA draft: 1969: Supplemental round
- Drafted by: Philadelphia 76ers
- Playing career: 1969–1975
- Position: Small forward / shooting guard
- Number: 23, 45, 40, 42

Career history
- 1969–1972: Pittsburgh Pipers/Condors
- 1972–1975: Seattle SuperSonics
- 1974: →Cherry Hill Rookies

Career highlights
- 2× ABA All-Star (1971, 1972); All-ABA Second Team (1971); ABA All-Rookie First Team (1970)

Career ABA and NBA statistics
- Points: 6,847 (20.7 ppg)
- Rebounds: 2,152 (6.5 rpg)
- Assists: 787 (2.4 apg)
- Stats at NBA.com
- Stats at Basketball Reference

John Brisker (June 15, 1947 – declared dead May 29, 1985) was an American professional basketball player who disappeared on April 11, 1978, after allegedly visiting Uganda. He played college basketball for the Toledo Rockets until he left the team during his senior season in 1968. Brisker began his professional career with the Pittsburgh Pipers / Condors of the American Basketball Association (ABA) where he was a two-time ABA All-Star and had a reputation as one of the league's premier tough guys. He played for the Seattle SuperSonics of the National Basketball Association (NBA) from 1972 to 1975.

Brisker allegedly travelled to Uganda in 1978 where he disappeared after last making contact with his girlfriend on April 11, 1978. He was declared dead on May 29, 1985, to settle his estate but his final movements are unknown and his death was doubted by the State Department.

== Career ==
Brisker was a 6′5″ forward/guard who played for the Toledo Rockets basketball team of the University of Toledo. He was selected as a supplemental draft pick in the 1969 NBA draft by the Philadelphia 76ers after previously playing only six games for the University of Toledo in what was to have been his senior year there. However, despite him going undrafted in the 1969 ABA draft, Brisker decided to play for the ABA's own Pennsylvania-based professional basketball team, the Pittsburgh Pipers, instead. Brisker played six seasons in the ABA and NBA as a member of the Pittsburgh Pipers (1969–1970), Pittsburgh Condors (1970–1972) and Seattle SuperSonics (1972–1975). He averaged 20.7 points per game over the course of his ABA/NBA career (26.1 points per game in the ABA, and 11.9 points per game in the NBA).

Brisker developed a reputation as one of the most volatile players in basketball. According to his Condors teammate Charlie Williams, "He was an excellent player, but say something wrong to the guy and you had this feeling he would reach into his bag, take out a gun and shoot you." He was ejected so often for fighting that he was nicknamed "the heavyweight champion of the ABA." The Condors made much of Brisker's reputation as an enforcer; their media guide portrayed him wearing a pair of six-shooters. In Loose Balls, Tom Nissalke related a story about how his Dallas Chaparrals wanted to break a nine-game losing streak: he offered $500 to whoever decked Brisker. Lenny Chappell suggested he should start the game against Pittsburgh. Chappell was allowed to start the game and on the jump ball, he proceeded to knock Brisker out to the floor and even managed to avoid being called for a foul.

In a 1971 game against the Denver Rockets, Brisker was ejected two minutes into the game for an elbow on the Rockets' Art Becker. Brisker charged back onto the court three times in order to go after Becker. A group of police officers threatened to arrest Brisker and finally persuaded him to return to the locker room.

In 1972, Brisker signed with the Seattle SuperSonics who signed him on a long-term contract. He clashed repeatedly with head coach Bill Russell who was a strict disciplinarian. Brisker alienated his teammates after he punched Joby Wright during a practice and knocked out four of his teeth. He had his best output in Seattle during his first season in 1972–73 when he averaged 12.8 points a game. Brisker's scoring numbers declined each season to 12.5 and 7.7 the next two years.

In February 1974, Brisker was assigned by the Seattle SuperSonics to the Cherry Hill Rookies of the Eastern Basketball Association. He scored 51 points in his debut and then 58 points in his second game. Brisker had scored 29 points in his third game when he exited due to a back injury. He returned to Seattle for treatment and convinced the SuperSonics to recall him which they did on February 14.

== Personal life ==
On October 3, 1972, Brisker married Dion Michele Jones. His first daughter was born in 1974. Brisker made the first of several trips to Africa in 1975 which Jones objected and was a cause of friction in their relationship. Jones filed for divorce in 1977 and claimed that Brisker physically abused her. The divorce was granted in June 1978.

Brisker had multiple children with different spouses. He is the grandfather of NFL safety Jaquan Brisker.

== Disappearance ==
In 1975, Brisker informed his brother, Ralph, that he had travelled to Nigeria and bought land there as "an investment-type thing." In March 1978, Brisker departed for Africa and told his girlfriend, Khalilah Rashad, that he wanted to establish an import-export business. He called Rashad from Africa four times with the last call being from Kampala, Uganda, on April 11. Brisker did not make contact with his girlfriend or anyone from his family after that date. He then allegedly spent a year in Africa traveling with a man and woman. The woman wrote numerous letters to her family in the United States which detailed that the group traveled from Liberia to Uganda in March 1979; they were not heard from again.

In June 1980, the Associated Press revealed that Brisker had not been heard from for at least two years. By that time, his acquaintances believed that he had been shot and killed in Uganda at some point within the previous year. Brisker's family had heard rumors of his death and contacted the United States Department of State and FBI yet they could uncover no records of his death. His brother theorised that Brisker could have been "just layin' low" or hiding from his ex-wife but conceded that it was unusual for him to not contact anyone.

On May 29, 1985, Brisker was declared dead in absentia by the medical examiner of King County for the purpose of settling his estate. However, the State Department could not confirm that Brisker had ever travelled to Africa; a spokesperson stated that "essentially, we don’t consider him dead." The Ugandan Embassy and International Red Cross could not confirm that Brisker had died. After the ruling, Ralph believed that his brother was still alive and possibly a prisoner of war in Uganda.

It is unknown what happened to Brisker. His former SuperSonics teammates have speculated that he was killed while fighting as a mercenary or shot in an argument with persons in the Ugandan government.

== Career statistics ==
Legend
GP	Games played	GS	Games started	MPG	Minutes per game
FG%	Field goal percentage	3P%	3-point field goal percentage	FT%	Free throw percentage
RPG	Rebounds per game	APG	Assists per game	SPG	Steals per game
BPG	Blocks per game	PPG	Points per game	**Bold**	Career high

=== ABA/NBA ===
==== Regular season ====
Year	Team	GP	MPG	FG%	3P%	FT%	RPG	APG	SPG	BPG	PPG
1969–70	Pittsburgh (ABA)	77	28.2	**.461**	.293	.827	5.7	1.7			21.0
1970–71	Pittsburgh (ABA)	**79**	39.1	.455	**.337**	.829	**9.7**	2.9			**29.3**
1971–72	Pittsburgh (ABA)	49	**42.1**	.458	.314	**.867**	9.1	**4.1**			28.9
1972–73	Seattle (NBA)	70	23.3	.435		.822	4.6	2.1			12.8
1973–74	Seattle (NBA)	35	20.5	.449		.820	4.2	1.6	**.8**	**.2**	12.5
1974–75	Seattle (NBA)	21	13.1	.426		.857	1.6	.9	.3	.1	7.7
Career (ABA)		205	35.7	.458	.321	.837	8.1	2.7			26.1
Career (NBA)		126	20.8	.438		.826	4.0	1.8	.6	.2	11.9
Career (overall)		331	30.1	.453	.321	.834	6.5	2.4	.6	.2	20.7
All–Star (ABA)		2	24.0	.276	.000	.700	11.0	2.0			11.5

== See also ==
- List of people who disappeared
