= Floyd Kerr =

American basketball player (1946–2023)

Personal information
- Born: November 20, 1946 Oxford, Mississippi, U.S.
- Died: February 4, 2023 (aged 76)
- Listed height: 6 ft 3 in (1.91 m)
- Listed weight: 193 lb (88 kg)

Career information
- High school: Washington (South Bend, Indiana)
- College: Colorado State (1966–1969)
- NBA draft: 1969: 3rd round, 30th overall pick
- Drafted by: Phoenix Suns
- Position: Shooting guard
- Stats at Basketball Reference

Floyd Kerr (November 20, 1946 – February 4, 2023) was an American collegiate and professional basketball player and athletic administrator. Kerr was drafted by the Phoenix Suns in the third round (30th pick), of the 1969 NBA draft. Kerr played collegiately at Colorado State, where he and his twin brother, Lloyd Kerr, helped lead the Rams to the Elite Eight of the 1969 NCAA tournament.

After a basketball coaching career, Floyd Kerr was a long–time collegiate athletic administrator before his retirement.

== Early life ==
Born in Oxford, Mississippi, Floyd Kerr attended Washington High School in South Bend, Indiana.

== College career ==
Kerr played collegiately at Colorado State University from 1966 to 1969, playing alongside his brother Lloyd Kerr. Playing 66 games in his three varsity seasons (freshmen did not play varsity games in the era), Floyd Kerr averaged 13.0 points and 5.9 rebounds in his collegiate career.

As a sophomore in 1966–67, Kerr averaged 9.7 points and 3.3 rebounds, as the Independent Colorado State Rams finished with a 13–10 record. In his junior season of 1967–68, Kerr led the Rams in both scoring and rebounding, averaging 15.9 points and 7.6 rebounds per game. His brother Lloyd averaged 14.6 points and 5.8 rebounds, as Colorado State finished with an 11–13 record.

During 1968–1969, the Kerr brothers helped lead the Colorado State Rams to the Elite Eight of the 1969 NCAA tournament. Floyd Kerr averaged 14.0 points and 6.9 rebounds, while Lloyd Kerr averaged 15.8 points and 5.7 rebounds for the season. Colorado State finished with a 17–7 record.

In the 25–team 1969 NCAA tournament, Kerr had 11 points and 8 rebounds in a 52–50 win over Dayton in the opening round. Playing in–state rival Colorado in the Midwest Regional semifinal, Kerr had 14 points and 3 rebounds in a 64–58 Colorado State victory over Colorado. In the Midwest Regional final, Floyd Kerr had 21 points to lead the team in a 84–77 loss to Drake in his final collegiate game. Floyd Kerr was named to the Midwest All–Region team.

== Professional basketball career ==
After completing his career at Colorado State, Kerr was drafted by the Phoenix Suns in the third round of the 1969 NBA draft, with the 30th overall pick. His brother Lloyd was also drafted by Phoenix, with the 39th pick in the same draft. Floyd Kerr was also drafted by the Los Angeles Stars of the American Basketball Association in the 1969 ABA Draft. Despite not playing football, Floyd Kerr was drafted by the Dallas Cowboys as a defensive back in the 16th round of the 1969 NFL/AFL draft. Kerr played one season with the Harlem Magicians and another professional season in Belgium winning the European championship. Kerr played for the Utah Stars in the pre–season in 1971.

== Coaching and administrative career ==
Kerr returned to his alma mater to become an assistant basketball coach at Colorado State, serving in that role from 1974 to 1980 as the first black basketball coach at the university. In 1992, Kerr was head coach of the Youngstown Pride of the World Basketball League in the final season of the league. Kerr served as Assistant Athletic Director at Youngstown State University from 1993 to 2000 and became the athletic director at Southern University, a position he held from 2000 to 2005. From 2005 until his retirement in 2016, Kerr was the athletic director at Morgan State University.

In 2004, Kerr was ranked 75th as one of the 101 most influential minorities in sports by Sports Illustrated magazine.

== Personal life and death ==
Floyd Kerr and wife Vivian were married in 1969.

Kerr died on February 4, 2023, at the age of 76.

== Awards ==
In 2006, Floyd Kerr was inducted into the Colorado State Athletics Hall of Fame.
