= Charlie Hentz =

American basketball player

Personal information
- Born: September 13, 1947 (age 79)
- Listed height: 6 ft 5 in (1.96 m)
- Listed weight: 210 lb (95 kg)

Career information
- College: Arkansas–Pine Bluff (1965–1969)
- NBA draft: 1969: 5th round, 63rd overall pick
- Drafted by: San Diego Rockets
- Playing career: 1970–1971
- Position: Power forward
- Number: 21

Career history
- 1970–1971: Pittsburgh Condors
- 1970–1971: Wilkes-Barre Barons
- Stats at Basketball Reference

Charles Hentz (born March 17, 1948) is an American former professional basketball player.

A 6'5" forward from Arkansas AM&N College, Hentz was the 6th pick in the 5th round of the 1969 NBA draft (63rd overall pick), selected by the San Diego Rockets, but he signed with the Pittsburgh Condors of the American Basketball Association. He appeared in 57 games during the 1970–71 ABA season, averaging 6.0 points per game and 6.8 rebounds per game. He was nicknamed "The Helicopter" for his jumping and dunking abilities.

Hentz is best remembered for his actions in a November 6, 1970 game against the Carolina Cougars in Raleigh, North Carolina. Late in the first half, Hentz went up for a dunk and tore the rim from his team's backboard, shattering the glass backboard. The game was delayed for about an hour as a new wooden backboard was installed and glass shards were cleared. The game resumed, and with 67 seconds left, Hentz destroyed yet another glass backboard while dunking. No more replacements were available, and coaches and referees agreed to just end the game. Teammate Charlie Williams later recalled that "the Helicopter just stood there smiling."

A starter early in the season, Hentz was later consigned to the Pittsburgh bench. After signing ex-Boston Celtics forward Rich Johnson, the Condors waived Hentz on February 27, 1971.

Hentz played for the Wilkes-Barre Barons of the Eastern Basketball Association (EBA) during the 1970–71 season.
