= Willie Taylor (basketball) =

American basketball player (1946–2026)

Personal information
- Born: September 24, 1946
- Died: January 29, 2026 (aged 79) Germantown, Tennessee, U.S.
- Listed height: 6 ft 8 in (2.03 m)
- Listed weight: 240 lb (109 kg)

Career information
- High school: Henry (Byhalia, Mississippi)
- College: LeMoyne–Owen (1965–1969)
- NBA draft: 1969: 2nd round, 28th overall pick
- Drafted by: Philadelphia 76ers
- Position: Center
- Stats at Basketball Reference

Willie James Taylor (September 24, 1946 – January 29, 2026) was an American basketball player. He played college basketball for the LeMoyne–Owen Magicians and was selected by the Philadelphia 76ers as the 28th overall pick of the 1969 NBA draft.

== Playing career ==
Taylor was born on September 24, 1946, and played basketball at Henry High School in Byhalia, Mississippi. He played college basketball for the LeMoyne–Owen Magicians where he starred as a center from 1965 to 1969. He averaged 18 points and 18 rebounds per game during his senior season.

Taylor was selected by the Philadelphia 76ers as the 28th overall pick in the 1969 NBA draft. He was drafted at the recommendation of a 76ers scout who saw him play at the 1969 Southern Intercollegiate Athletic Conference Tournament where he recorded 25 points and 22 rebounds in a game. 76ers head coach and general manager, Jack Ramsay, considered taking Taylor in the first round – ultimately choosing Bud Ogden – and claimed that "he could be the biggest sleeper in the draft." Taylor signed a one-year deal with the 76ers on June 29, 1969, but only played sparingly in two exhibition games. He was waived by the 76ers on September 28, 1969, as the team's final roster cut before the start of the 1969–70 NBA season.

== Personal life and death ==
Taylor was the pastor of Mt. Olive MB Church in Byhalia. He had three children with his wife, Cassie, who died in 2014 after 44 years of marriage.

Taylor died at Methodist Germantown Hospital in Germantown, Tennessee, on January 29, 2026, at the age of 79.
