= Justus Thigpen =

American basketball player (born 1947)

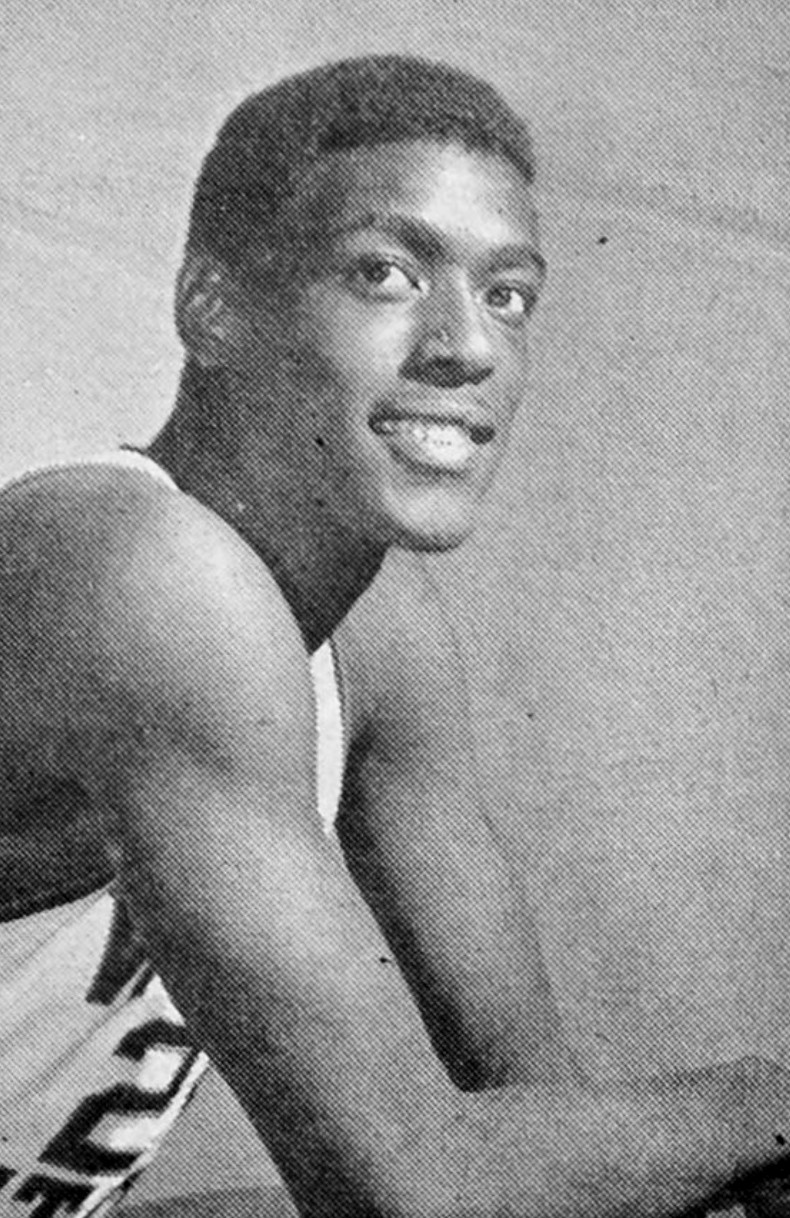

Personal information
- Born: August 13, 1947 (age 79)
- Listed height: 6 ft 1 in (1.85 m)
- Listed weight: 160 lb (73 kg)

Career information
- High school: Northern (Flint, Michigan)
- College: Mott CC (1965–1967); Weber State (1967–1969)
- NBA draft: 1969: 11th round, 147th overall pick
- Drafted by: San Diego Rockets
- Playing career: 1970–1973
- Position: Point guard
- Number: 11, 31, 23

Career history
- 1970: Pittsburgh Pipers
- 1972–1973: Flint Pros
- 1973: Detroit Pistons
- 1973: Flint Pros
- 1973: Kansas City-Omaha Kings
- Stats at NBA.com
- Stats at Basketball Reference

Justus Thigpen (born August 13, 1947) is an American former professional basketball player.

== Career ==
Thigpen was selected by the San Diego Rockets in the 11th round of the 1969 NBA draft.

Thigpen played for the following teams: Pittsburgh Pipers (1969–70 ABA season), Detroit Pistons (1972–73 NBA season), and Kansas City-Omaha Kings (1973–74 NBA season).

In 1972–73, he was playing for the Flint Pros of the Continental Basketball Association when he signed with Detroit. In the 1973–74 season, he was again playing for Flint before he joined Kansas City-Omaha for three weeks. After his stint with the Kings, he learned that the Pros had folded.

A 6'1" guard, Thigpen played college basketball at Weber State University.
