= Dave Scholz =

American basketball player

Personal information
- Born: April 12, 1948
- Died: December 5, 2015 (aged 67)
- Listed height: 6 ft 8 in (2.03 m)
- Listed weight: 220 lb (100 kg)

Career information
- High school: Stephen Decatur (Decatur, Illinois)
- College: Illinois (1966–1969)
- NBA draft: 1969: 4th round, 56th overall pick
- Drafted by: Philadelphia 76ers
- Playing career: 1969–1971
- Position: Forward
- Number: 25

Career history
- 1969: Philadelphia 76ers
- 1969–1970: Hamden Bics
- 1970–1971: Scranton Apollos

Career highlights
- EBA champion (1971); All-EPBL Second Team (1970); Third-team All-American – AP (1969)
- Stats at NBA.com
- Stats at Basketball Reference

David Anthony Scholz (April 12, 1948 – December 5, 2015) was an American basketball player.

Scholz was born in 1948. He attended Stephen Decatur High School in Decatur, Illinois. He was selected by the Associated Press (AP) to the All-Illinois high school basketball team in March 1965. He also led Decatur to the Elite Eight of the state tournament his junior and senior seasons.

He then enrolled at the University of Illinois. He became a starter for the Illinois men's basketball team in December 1966, scoring 22 points in his first start. He was also a two-time, first-team All-Big-10 selection and an AP All-American third-team selection. In March 1969, he became the leading scorer in the history of Illinois basketball.

Scholz was taken with the thirteenth pick in the fourth round of the 1969 NBA draft by the Philadelphia 76ers. He played in one game for the 76ers, recording two points. Scholz played in the Eastern Professional Basketball League (EPBL) / Eastern Basketball Association (EBA) for the Hamden Bics and Scranton Apollos from 1969 to 1971. He won an EBA championship with the Apollos in 1971. Scholz was selected to the All-EPBL Second Team in 1970.

Scholz later resided in Nashville, Tennessee. He died in 2015 at age 67.

== Career statistics ==
Legend
GP	Games played	GS	Games started	MPG	Minutes per game
FG%	Field goal percentage	3P%	3-point field goal percentage	FT%	Free throw percentage
RPG	Rebounds per game	APG	Assists per game	SPG	Steals per game
BPG	Blocks per game	PPG	Points per game	**Bold**	Career high

=== NBA ===
==== Regular season ====
Year	Team	GP	MPG	FG%	FT%	RPG	APG	PPG
1969–70	Philadelphia	1	1.0	1.000	–	.0	.0	2.0
