= Bobby Washington =

American basketball player (born 1947)

Personal information
- Born: July 11, 1947 (age 79) Lexington, Kentucky, U.S.
- Listed height: 5 ft 11 in (1.80 m)
- Listed weight: 175 lb (79 kg)

Career information
- High school: Dunbar (Lexington, Kentucky)
- College: Eastern Kentucky (1966–1969)
- NBA draft: 1969: undrafted
- Position: Point guard
- Number: 34, 17

Career history
- 1969: Kentucky Colonels
- 1970–1972: Cleveland Cavaliers
- Stats at NBA.com
- Stats at Basketball Reference

Robert Washington (born July 11, 1947) is an American former professional basketball player. He played with the Kentucky Colonels during the 1969–70 season in the American Basketball Association (ABA) and with the Cleveland Cavaliers during the 1970–71 and 1971–72 seasons in the NBA.

On November 7, 1971, while playing for the Cavaliers in a home game against the Portland Trail Blazers, Washington recorded a career high 20 assists. At the time, the mark was also a Cleveland Cavaliers franchise record, later tied by Lenny Wilkens and broken by Geoff Huston.
