= 1969 NBA draft =

Basketball player selection

General information
- Dates: April 7, 1969 (Rounds 1 & 2); May 7, 1969 (Other rounds)
- Location: New York City, New York

Overview
- 218 total selections in 20 rounds
- League: NBA
- First selection: Lew Alcindor, Milwaukee Bucks
- Hall of Famers: 3: C Lew Alcindor; G Jo Jo White; G Bob Dandridge

The 1969 NBA draft was the 23rd annual draft of the National Basketball Association (NBA). The draft was held on April 7 and May 7, 1969, before the 1969–70 season. In this draft, fourteen NBA teams took turns selecting amateur U.S. college basketball players. A player who had finished his four-year college eligibility was eligible for selection. If a player left college early, he would not be eligible for selection until his college class graduated.

The first two picks in the draft belonged to the teams that finished last in each division, with the order determined by a coin flip. The Milwaukee Bucks won the coin flip in the commissioner's New York office on March 19 and were awarded the first overall pick, while the Phoenix Suns went second. The remaining first-round picks and the subsequent rounds were assigned to teams in reverse order of their win–loss record in the previous season. The Los Angeles Lakers were awarded an extra first-round draft pick as settlement of the Rudy LaRusso trade to the San Francisco Warriors. The draft consisted of twenty rounds and selected 218 players.

== Draftee career notes ==
Lew Alcindor (later known as Kareem Abdul-Jabbar) from UCLA was selected first overall by the Milwaukee Bucks. He went on to win the Rookie of the Year Award and was selected to both All-NBA Second Team and All-Star Game in his first season. The following season, the Bucks acquired 31-year old point guard Oscar Robertson from the Cincinnati Royals. They led the Bucks to a league-best 66 wins in the regular season. The Bucks then beat the Baltimore Bullets in the Finals to win their first NBA championship, in only their third season. In that season, Alcindor also won the Most Valuable Player Award and Finals Most Valuable Player Award. He went on to win five more NBA championships in the 1980s with the Los Angeles Lakers, where he teamed up with Magic Johnson, the first pick in 1979. He also won another Finals Most Valuable Player Award in 1985. He won a total of six Most Valuable Player Award, the most in the history of the NBA. He also held the record for the most All-Star Game selections with 19 and the most All-NBA Team selections with 15. Furthermore, he was selected to eleven All-Defensive Teams, the second most selections. He retired as all–time league scoring leader with 38,387 points and the all–time league leader in total blocked shots with 3,189 blocks. For his achievements, he has been inducted to the Basketball Hall of Fame. He was also named in the 50 Greatest Players in NBA History list announced at the league's 50th anniversary in 1996.

Jo Jo White, the ninth pick, won two NBA championships with the Boston Celtics in 1974 and 1976. He was named as the Finals Most Valuable Player in the latter. He was selected to two All-NBA Teams and seven All-Star Games. 45th pick Bob Dandridge won two NBA championships with the Milwaukee Bucks in 1971 and with the Washington Bullets in the 1978. He was selected to one All-NBA Team and four All-Star Games. Norm Van Lier, the 34th pick, was selected to both the All-NBA Team and the All-Star Game. He was also selected to eight All-Defensive Teams. Two other players from this draft, 10th pick Butch Beard and 61st pick Steve Mix, was also selected to an All-Star Game. Beard became a head coach after his playing career, he coached the New Jersey Nets for two seasons in the 1990s. Three other players drafted also went on to have a coaching career: 43rd pick Fred Carter, 68th pick Gene Littles and 187th pick Mack Calvin.

In the 13th round, the San Francisco Warriors selected Denise Long, a girl's high school player from Whitten, Iowa. Long, who averaged 62.8 points per game in her senior year, became the first female ever to be drafted by an NBA team. However, the selection was later voided by commissioner J. Walter Kennedy as a publicity stunt. In the 15th round, the Phoenix Suns selected track and field athlete Bob Beamon from the University of Texas at El Paso with the 189th pick. He had just broken the world record for long jump and won the gold medal at the 1968 Olympic Games. Although he had played basketball before his athletics career, he stayed with it and never played in the NBA.

== Draft selections ==
Pos.	G	F	C
Position	Guard	Forward	Center

^	Denotes player who has been inducted to the Naismith Memorial Basketball Hall of Fame
*	Denotes player who has been selected for at least one All-Star Game and All-NBA Team
^{+}	Denotes player who has been selected for at least one All-Star Game
^{#}	Denotes player who has never appeared in an NBA regular-season or playoff game
^{~}	Denotes player who has been selected as Rookie of the Year

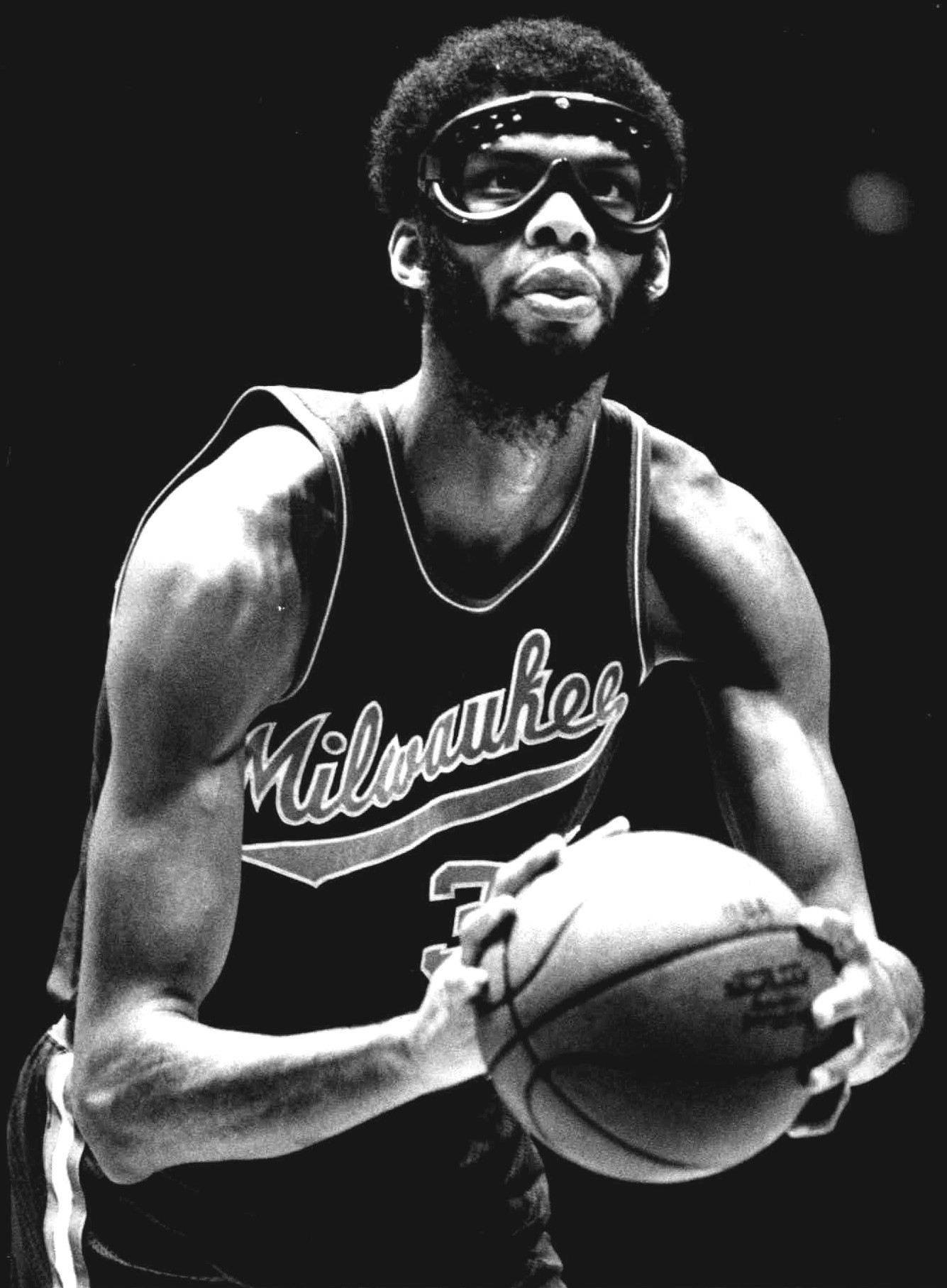
Center Lew Alcindor of UCLA (later known as Kareem Abdul-Jabbar) was selected first overall by the Milwaukee Bucks

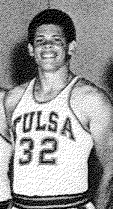
Bobby "Bingo" Smith was selected 6th overall by the San Diego Rockets.

Rnd.	Pick	Player	Pos.	Nationality (Note: Nationality indicates the player's national team or representative nationality. If a player has not competed at the international level, then the nationality indicates the national team which the player is eligible to represent according to FIBA rules.)	Team	School / club team
1	1	Lew Alcindor^^{~}	C	United States	Milwaukee Bucks	UCLA (Sr.)
1	2	Neal Walk	C	United States	Phoenix Suns	Florida (Sr.)
1	3	Lucius Allen	G	United States	Seattle SuperSonics	UCLA (Sr.)
1	4	Terry Driscoll	F	United States	Detroit Pistons	Boston College (Sr.)
1	5	Larry Cannon	G	United States	Chicago Bulls	La Salle (Sr.)
1	6	Bingo Smith	G/F	United States	San Diego Rockets	Tulsa (Sr.)
1	7	Bob Portman	F	United States	San Francisco Warriors	Creighton (Sr.)
1	8	Herm Gilliam	G/F	United States	Cincinnati Royals	Purdue (Sr.)
1	9	Jo Jo White^	G	United States	Boston Celtics	Kansas (Sr.)
1	10	Butch Beard^{+}	G	United States	Atlanta Hawks	Louisville (Sr.)
1	11	John Warren	G/F	United States	New York Knicks	St. John's (Sr.)
1	12	Willie McCarter	G	United States	Los Angeles Lakers	Drake (Sr.)
1	13	Bud Ogden	F	United States	Philadelphia 76ers	Santa Clara (Sr.)
1	14	Mike Davis	G	United States	Baltimore Bullets	Virginia Union (Sr.)
1	15	Rick Roberson	F/C	United States	Los Angeles Lakers	Cincinnati (Sr.)
2	16	Simmie Hill^{#}	F	United States	Chicago Bulls (from Phoenix)	West Texas State (Sr.)
2	17	Bob Greacen	F	United States	Milwaukee Bucks	Rutgers (Sr.)
2	18	Ron Taylor^{#}	C	United States	Seattle SuperSonics	USC (Sr.)
2	19	Willie Norwood	F	United States	Detroit Pistons	Alcorn A&M (Sr.)
2	20	Ken Spain^{#}	C	United States	Chicago Bulls	Houston (Sr.)
2	21	Bernie Williams	G	United States	San Diego Rockets	La Salle (Sr.)
2	22	Ed Siudut^{#}	F	United States	San Francisco Warriors	Holy Cross (Sr.)
2	23	Johnny Baum	F	United States	Chicago Bulls (from Cincinnati)^{[a]}	Temple (Sr.)
2	24	Gene Williams^{#}	F	United States	Phoenix Suns (from Boston)^{[b]}	Kansas State (Sr.)
2	25	Wally Anderzunas	F/C	United States	Atlanta Hawks	Creighton (Sr.)
2	26	Bill Bunting^{#}	F/C	United States	New York Knicks	North Carolina (Sr.)
2	27	Dick Garrett	G	United States	Los Angeles Lakers	Southern Illinois (Sr.)
2	28	Willie Taylor^{#}	F/C	United States	Philadelphia 76ers	LeMoyne–Owen (Sr.)
2	29	Willie Scott^{#}	F	United States	Baltimore Bullets	Alabama State (Sr.)
3	30	Floyd Kerr^{#}	G	United States	Phoenix Suns	Colorado State (Sr.)
3	31	Skeeter Swift^{#}	G	United States	Milwaukee Bucks	East Tennessee State (Sr.)
3	32	Lee Winfield	G	United States	Seattle SuperSonics	North Texas State (Sr.)
3	33	Lamar Green	F/C	United States	Phoenix Suns (from Detroit)^{[c]}	Morehead State (Sr.)
3	34	Norm Van Lier*	G	United States	Chicago Bulls	Saint Francis (PA) (Sr.)
3	35	Charles Bonaparte^{#}	G	United States	San Diego Rockets	Norfolk State (Sr.)
3	36	Tom Hagan^{#}	G	United States	San Francisco Warriors	Vanderbilt (Sr.)
3	37	Luther Rackley	C	United States	Cincinnati Royals	Xavier (OH) (Sr.)
3	38	Julius Keye^{#}	F-C	United States	Boston Celtics	Alcorn State (Sr.)
3	39	Lloyd Kerr^{#}	G	United States	Phoenix Suns	Colorado State (Sr.)
3	40	Eddie Mast	F/C	United States	New York Knicks	Temple (Sr.)
3	41	Luther Green	F	United States	Cincinnati Royals (from Los Angeles)	Long Island (Sr.)
3	42	Mike Grosso^{#}	C	United States	Philadelphia 76ers	Louisville (Jr.)
3	43	Fred Carter	G/F	United States	Baltimore Bullets	Mount St. Mary's (Sr.)
4	44	Dennis Stewart	F	United States	Phoenix Suns	Michigan (Sr.)
4	45	Bob Dandridge*	G/F	United States	Milwaukee Bucks	Norfolk State (Sr.)
4	46	Butch Booker^{#}	C	United States	Seattle SuperSonics	Cheyney (Sr.)
4	47	Ted Wierman^{#}	F	United States	Detroit Pistons	Washington State (Sr.)
4	48	Dave Nash^{#}	C	United States	Chicago Bulls	Kansas (Sr.)
4	49	Johnnie Allen^{#}	F	United States	San Diego Rockets	Bethune–Cookman (Sr.)
4	50	Lee Lafayette^{#}	F	United States	San Francisco Warriors	Michigan State (Sr.)
4	51	Ron Sanford^{#}	F	United States	Cincinnati Royals	New Mexico (Sr.)
4	52	Steve Kuberski	F/C	United States	Boston Celtics	Bradley (Sr.)
4	53	Billy Hann^{#}	G	United States	Atlanta Hawks	Tennessee (Sr.)
4	54	Elnardo Webster^{#}	F	United States	New York Knicks	Saint Peter's (Sr.)
4	55	Don Griffin^{#}	G	United States	Atlanta Hawks	Stanford (Sr.)
4	56	Dave Scholz	F	United States	Philadelphia 76ers	Illinois (Sr.)
4	57	Gene Ford^{#}	F	United States	Baltimore Bullets	Western Michigan (Sr.)
5	58	Rich Jones	F/C	United States	Phoenix Suns	Memphis State (Sr.)
5	59	Kenny Heitz^{#}	G	United States	Milwaukee Bucks	UCLA (Sr.)
5	60	Jerry King^{#}	G	United States	Seattle SuperSonics	Louisville (Sr.)
5	61	Steve Mix^{+}	F	United States	Detroit Pistons	Toledo (Sr.)
5	62	Chris Ellis^{#}	G	United States	Chicago Bulls	Virginia Tech (Sr.)
5	63	Charlie Hentz^{#}	F	United States	San Diego Rockets	Arkansas–Pine Bluff (Sr.)
5	64	Willie Wise	F	United States	San Francisco Warriors	Drake (Sr.)
5	65	Jake Ford	G	United States	Cincinnati Royals	Maryland State (Jr.)
5	66	George Thompson	G	United States	Boston Celtics	Marquette (Sr.)
5	67	Mike Mitchell^{#}	G	United States	Atlanta Hawks	West Texas State (Sr.)
5	68	Gene Littles^{#}	G	United States	New York Knicks	High Point (Sr.)
5	69	Wil Jones	F	United States	Los Angeles Lakers	Albany State (Sr.)
5	70	Joe Cromer^{#}	F	United States	Philadelphia 76ers	Temple (Sr.)
5	71	Willie Jackson^{#}	F	United States	Baltimore Bullets	Morehead State (Sr.)
6	72	Dan Sadlier^{#}	F	United States	Phoenix Suns	Dayton (Sr.)
6	73	John Arthurs	G	United States	Milwaukee Bucks	Tulane (Sr.)
6	74	Ben McGilmer^{#}	F	United States	Seattle SuperSonics	Iowa (Sr.)
6	75	Larry Jeffries^{#}	G	United States	Detroit Pistons	Trinity (TX) (Sr.)
6	76	George Tinsley^{#}	F	United States	Chicago Bulls	Kentucky Wesleyan (Sr.)
6	77	Bob Tallent^{#}	G	United States	San Diego Rockets	George Washington (Sr.)
6	78	Dan Obrovac^{#}	F	United States	San Francisco Warriors	Dayton (Sr.)
6	79	Mel Coleman^{#}	F	United States	Cincinnati Royals	Stout State (Sr.)
6	80	Dolph Pulliam^{#}	F	United States	Boston Celtics	Drake (Sr.)
6	81	Guy Mackner^{#}	F	United States	Atlanta Hawks	South Dakota State (Sr.)
6	82	Dwight Durante^{#}	G	United States	New York Knicks	Catawba (Sr.)
6	83	Dick Grubar^{#}	G	United States	Los Angeles Lakers	North Carolina (Sr.)
6	84	John Jones^{#}	G	United States	Philadelphia 76ers	Villanova (Sr.)
6	85	Paul Loveday^{#}	F	United States	Baltimore Bullets	California (Sr.)
7	86	Bill Sweek^{#}	G	United States	Phoenix Suns	UCLA (Sr.)
7	87	Billy Keller^{#}	G	United States	Milwaukee Bucks	Purdue (Sr.)
7	88	Greg Wittman^{#}	F	United States	Seattle SuperSonics	Western Carolina (Sr.)
7	89	Steve Vandenberg^{#}	F	United States	Detroit Pistons	Duke (Sr.)
7	90	Frank Judge^{#}	G	United States	Chicago Bulls	Huston–Tillotson (Sr.)
7	91	Lynn Shackelford^{#}	F	United States	San Diego Rockets	UCLA (Sr.)
7	92	Pat Foley^{#}	F	United States	San Francisco Warriors	Pacific (Sr.)
7	93	L.C. Bowen^{#}	G	United States	Cincinnati Royals	Bradley (Sr.)
7	94	Jim Johnson^{#}	F	United States	Boston Celtics	Wisconsin (Sr.)
7	95	Bob Bundy^{#}	F	United States	Atlanta Hawks	Vanderbilt (Sr.)
7	96	Chris Thomforde^{#}	F	United States	New York Knicks	Princeton (Sr.)
7	97	Kari Liimo^{#}	F	Finland	Los Angeles Lakers	BYU (Sr.)
7	98	Dave Hamilton^{#}	F	United States	Philadelphia 76ers	West Virginia State (Sr.)
7	99	Jeff Claypool^{#}	F	United States	Baltimore Bullets	Grove City (Sr.)
8	100	Bob Edwards^{#}	C	United States	Phoenix Suns	Arizona State (Sr.)
8	101	John Schell^{#}	F	United States	Milwaukee Bucks	Wisconsin (Sr.)
8	102	Theartis Wallace^{#}	G	United States	Seattle SuperSonics	Central Washington (Sr.)
8	103	Bob Arnzen	F	United States	Detroit Pistons	Notre Dame (Sr.)
8	104	Roger Moller^{#}	C	United States	Chicago Bulls	Westmar (Sr.)
8	105	Bill DeHeer^{#}	F	United States	San Diego Rockets	Indiana (Sr.)
8	106	Steve Rippe^{#}	F	United States	San Francisco Warriors	UC Santa Barbara (Sr.)
8	107	Merton Bancroft^{#}	F	United States	Cincinnati Royals	Missouri State (Sr.)
8	108	Bob Whitmore^{#}	F	United States	Boston Celtics	Notre Dame (Sr.)
8	109	Bob Christian	C	United States	Atlanta Hawks	Grambling (Sr.)
8	110	Jim Healey^{#}	G	United States	New York Knicks	Rockhurst (Sr.)
8	111	Joe Smith^{#}	F	United States	Los Angeles Lakers	Oklahoma State (Sr.)
8	112	Jim Bowles^{#}	F	United States	Philadelphia 76ers	Trinity (Sr.)
8	113	Barry White^{#}	F	United States	Baltimore Bullets	Hofstra (Sr.)
9	114	Steve Jennings^{#}	G	United States	Phoenix Suns	USC (Sr.)
9	115	Jim Satalin^{#}	G	United States	Milwaukee Bucks	St. Bonaventure (Sr.)
9	116	Vince Fritz^{#}	G	United States	Seattle SuperSonics	Oregon State (Sr.)
9	117	George Reynolds	G	United States	Detroit Pistons	Houston (Sr.)
9	118	Sterling Burke^{#}	F	United States	Chicago Bulls	Northwestern (Sr.)
9	119	Larry Cheatham^{#}	G	United States	San Diego Rockets	Tulsa (Sr.)
9	120	Greg Reed^{#}	F	United States	San Francisco Warriors	Sacramento State (Sr.)
9	121	James Hurley^{#}	G	United States	Cincinnati Royals	Transylvania (Sr.)
9	122	Gordon Smith^{#}	G	United States	Boston Celtics	Cincinnati (Sr.)
9	123	Pete Gayeska^{#}	C	United States	Atlanta Hawks	UMass (Sr.)
9	124	Roger Walaszek^{#}	G	United States	New York Knicks	Columbia (Sr.)
9	125	Jim Smith^{#}	C	United States	Los Angeles Lakers	Northern Illinois (Sr.)
9	126	Larry Lewis^{#}	F	United States	Philadelphia 76ers	Saint Francis (Sr.)
9	127	Gary Major^{#}	F	United States	Baltimore Bullets	Duquesne (Sr.)
10	128	Rick Abrahamson^{#}	G	United States	Phoenix Suns	Oregon (Sr.)
10	129	Willie Brown^{#}	G	United States	Milwaukee Bucks	Middle Tennessee (Sr.)
10	130	Al Cueto^{#}	C	Cuba	Seattle SuperSonics	Tulsa (Sr.)
10	131	Bill English^{#}	F	United States	Detroit Pistons	Winston-Salem State (Sr.)
10	132	Al Smith^{#}	G	United States	Chicago Bulls	U.S. Armed Forces (AAU)
10	133	Lee Sims^{#}	G	United States	San Diego Rockets	Ashland (Sr.)
10	134	Girard Chatman^{#}	F	United States	San Francisco Warriors	San Francisco State (Sr.)
10	135	Bill Bowes^{#}	F	United States	Cincinnati Royals	Elon (Sr.)
10	136	Jim Picka^{#}	C	United States	Boston Celtics	High Point (Sr.)
10	137	Dick Stewart^{#}	G	United States	Atlanta Hawks	Rutgers (Sr.)
10	138	Frank McLaughlin^{#}	G	United States	New York Knicks	Fordham (Sr.)
10	139	Phil Argento^{#}	G	United States	Los Angeles Lakers	Kentucky (Sr.)
10	140	Bill Justus^{#}	G	United States	Philadelphia 76ers	Tennessee (Sr.)
10	141	Frank Bartleson^{#}	F	United States	Baltimore Bullets	Tennessee Tech (Sr.)
11	142	Fred Lind^{#}	F	United States	Phoenix Suns	Duke (Sr.)
11	143	Bob Presley^{#}	C	United States	Milwaukee Bucks	California (Sr.)
11	144	Jim Connally^{#}	F	United States	Seattle SuperSonics	Bowling Green (So.)
11	145	Rusty Clark^{#}	F	United States	Detroit Pistons	North Carolina (Sr.)
11	146	Larry Bergh^{#}	F	United States	Chicago Bulls	Weber State (Sr.)
11	147	Justus Thigpen	G	United States	San Diego Rockets	Weber State (Sr.)
11	148	Rich Holmberg^{#}	F	United States	San Francisco Warriors	Saint Mary's (Sr.)
11	149	Jim Supple^{#}	G	United States	Cincinnati Royals	Georgetown (Sr.)
11	150	Larry Finstrom^{#}	C	United States	Boston Celtics	Kenyon (Sr.)
11	151	Loran Bracci^{#}	F	United States	Atlanta Hawks	Cal State Northridge (Sr.)
11	152	Marvin Lewis^{#}	F	United States	New York Knicks	Southampton (Sr.)
11	153	Ron Peret^{#}	F	United States	Los Angeles Lakers	Texas A&M (Sr.)
11	154	Bruce Sloan^{#}	F	United States	Philadelphia 76ers	Kansas (Sr.)
11	155	Jerry McKee^{#}	G	United States	Baltimore Bullets	Ohio (Sr.)
12	156	Bob Miller^{#}	F	United States	Phoenix Suns	Toledo (Sr.)
12	157	Jack Lutz^{#}	F	United States	Milwaukee Bucks	Carthage (Sr.)
12	158	John Smith^{#}	F	United States	Seattle SuperSonics	Puget Sound (Sr.)
12	159	Harry Hall^{#}	G	United States	Chicago Bulls	Wyoming (Sr.)
12	160	Raúl Duarte^{#}	F	Peru	San Diego Rockets	South Dakota State (Sr.)
12	161	Joe Callaghan^{#}	F	United States	San Francisco Warriors	San Francisco State (Sr.)
12	162	Mike Davis^{#}	C	United States	Cincinnati Royals	Colorado State (Sr.)
12	163	Rod Forbes^{#}	F	United States	Boston Celtics	Boston State (Sr.)
12	164	Dave Jones^{#}	G	United States	Atlanta Hawks	La Verne (Sr.)
12	165	Bill O'Rourke^{#}	G	United States	New York Knicks	St. John Fisher (Sr.)
12	166	Jack Gillespie^{#}	F	United States	Los Angeles Lakers	Montana State (Sr.)
12	167	Fatty Taylor	G	United States	Philadelphia 76ers	La Salle (Sr.)
12	168	Rob Washington^{#}	F	United States	Baltimore Bullets	Tulsa (Sr.)
13	169	Andy White^{#}	G	United States	Phoenix Suns	UTEP (Sr.)
13	170	Leo Osgood^{#}	G	United States	Milwaukee Bucks	Northeastern (Sr.)
13	171	Bob Burrows^{#}	G	Canada	Seattle SuperSonics	Seattle Pacific (Sr.)
13	172	Pee Wee Kirkland^{#}	G	United States	Chicago Bulls	Norfolk State (Sr.)
13	173	Joe McBride^{#}	F	United States	San Diego Rockets	Augusta State (Sr.)
13	San Francisco Warriors (forfeited due to selection of ineligible player) (Note: The Warriors selected Denise Long who had graduated from Union-Whitten High School. The pick was voided by NBA commissioner J. Walter Kennedy either because of the federal statutes of gender or the NBA requiring players to be four years removed from their high school class.)					
13	174	Ted Johnson^{#}	F	United States	Cincinnati Royals	Baldwin–Wallace (Sr.)
13	175	Billy Evans^{#}	G	United States	Boston Celtics	Boston College (Sr.)
13	176	Dick Barton^{#}	F	United States	Atlanta Hawks	UC Riverside (Sr.)
13	177	James Wyatt^{#}	F	United States	New York Knicks	Northwestern State (Sr.)
13	178	Mallory Chestnut^{#}	F	United States	Los Angeles Lakers	Tuskegee (Sr.)
13	179	Bill Thompson^{#}	G	United States	Baltimore Bullets	Shepherd (Sr.)
14	180	Marv Schmitt^{#}	G	United States	Phoenix Suns	Western New Mexico (Sr.)
14	181	Waymon Stewart^{#}	F	United States	Milwaukee Bucks	Lakeland (Sr.)
14	182	Jerry Conley^{#}	G	United States	Seattle SuperSonics	Morehead State (Sr.)
14	183	Bill Voight^{#}	G	United States	Chicago Bulls	SMU (Sr.)
14	184	Mike Heckman^{#}	G	United States	San Diego Rockets	UC Irvine (Sr.)
14	185	Mike Dahl^{#}	F	United States	Atlanta Hawks	Oglethorpe (Sr.)
14	186	Rich Travis^{#}	G	United States	New York Knicks	Oklahoma City (Sr.)
14	187	Mack Calvin	G	United States	Los Angeles Lakers	USC (Sr.)
14	188	Perry Johnson^{#}	F	United States	Baltimore Bullets	Robert Morris (So.)
15	189	Bob Beamon^{#}	F	United States	Phoenix Suns	Adelphi (Sr.)
15	190	Stan Wlodarczyk^{#}	F	United States	Milwaukee Bucks	La Salle (Sr.)
15	191	Ernie Powell^{#}	F	United States	Seattle SuperSonics	USC (Sr.)
15	192	Jerry Nickens^{#}	G	United States	San Diego Rockets	Tougaloo (Sr.)
15	193	Norm Carmichael^{#}	C	United States	Atlanta Hawks	Virginia (Sr.)
15	194	Jodie Harrison^{#}	G	United States	Baltimore Bullets	Illinois (Sr.)
16	195	Wayne Huckel^{#}	G	United States	Phoenix Suns	Davidson (Sr.)
16	196	Bill Voight^{#}	G	United States	Milwaukee Bucks	SMU (Sr.)
16	197	Danny Cornett^{#}	G	United States	Seattle SuperSonics	Morehead State (Sr.)
16	198	Dick Groves^{#}	F	United States	San Diego Rockets	San Jose State (Sr.)
16	199	Buddy Cornelius^{#}	F	United States	Atlanta Hawks	Jacksonville State (Sr.)
16	200	Phil Harris^{#}	C	United States	Baltimore Bullets	Trenton Colonials (EPBL)
17	201	Howie Dickenman^{#}	F	United States	Phoenix Suns	Central Connecticut (Sr.)
17	202	Lynn Phillips^{#}	F	United States	Milwaukee Bucks	SMU (Sr.)
17	203	Steve Honeycutt^{#}	G	United States	Seattle SuperSonics	Kansas State (Sr.)
17	204	Steve Howell^{#}	F	United States	San Diego Rockets	Ohio State (Sr.)
17	205	John Tolmie^{#}	G	United States	Atlanta Hawks	Navy (Sr.)
17	206	Tom Haggerty^{#}	C	United States	Baltimore Bullets	Brandeis (Sr.)
18	207	Al Nuness^{#}	G	United States	Phoenix Suns	Minnesota (Sr.)
18	208	Ken Hall^{#}	G	United States	Milwaukee Bucks	Westminster (Sr.)
18	209	Joe Pridgen^{#}	F	United States	San Diego Rockets	North Carolina Central (Sr.)
18	210	Cliff Parsons^{#}	C	United States	Atlanta Hawks	Air Force (Sr.)
18	211	Chip Case^{#}	G	United States	Baltimore Bullets	Virginia (Sr.)
19	212	Solomon Davis^{#}	F	United States	Phoenix Suns	Kentucky State (Sr.)
19	213	Blaine Royer^{#}	G	United States	San Diego Rockets	Illinois State (Sr.)
19	214	Grady O'Malley	F	United States	Atlanta Hawks	Manhattan (Sr.)
19	215	Brian Heaney	G	United States	Baltimore Bullets	Acadia (Canada) (Sr.)
20	216	Jim Plump^{#}	F	United States	Phoenix Suns	Northern Arizona (Sr.)
20	217	Carl Rodwell^{#}	F	Australia	Atlanta Hawks	UC Riverside (Sr.)
20	218	Stan McKain^{#}	G	United States	Baltimore Bullets	Southern (Sr.)
Supp.	–	John Brisker	F	United States	Philadelphia 76ers	Toledo (Jr.)

== Notable undrafted players ==
These players were not selected in the 1969 draft but played at least one game in the NBA.

Player	Pos.	Nationality	School/club team
Moe Barr	G	United States	Duquesne (Sr.)
A. W. Holt	F	United States	Jackson State (Sr.)
Gary Suiter	C/F	United States	Midwestern State (Sr.)
Bobby Washington	G	United States	Eastern Kentucky (Sr.)
Harthorne Wingo	F	United States	New Haven Elms (EPBL)

== Trades ==
- ^{a} On October 20, 1967, the Chicago Bulls acquired Flynn Robinson, 1968 and 1969 second-round picks from the Cincinnati Royals in exchange for Guy Rodgers. The Bulls used the pick to draft Johnny Baum.
- ^{b} On August 27, 1968, the Phoenix Suns acquired a second-round pick from the Boston Celtics in exchange for Em Bryant. The Suns used the pick to draft Gene Williams.
- ^{c} On December 17, 1968, the Phoenix Suns acquired Jim Fox and a third-round pick from the Detroit Pistons in exchange for McCoy McLemore. The Suns used the pick to draft Lamar Green.

== Notes ==
1: Lew Alcindor changed his name to Kareem Abdul-Jabbar in 1971.
2: The Los Angeles Lakers were awarded an extra first-round draft pick as settlement of the Rudy LaRusso trade to the San Francisco Warriors on August 31, 1967.

== See also ==
- List of first overall NBA draft picks
