= Al Cueto =

Cuban basketball player (born 1946)

Personal information
- Born: August 2, 1946 (age 80) Havana, Cuba
- Listed height: 6 ft 7 in (2.01 m)
- Listed weight: 230 lb (104 kg)

Career information
- High school: Coral Gables (Coral Gables, Florida)
- College: St. Gregory's (1965–1967); Tulsa (1967–1969)
- NBA draft: 1969: 10th round, 130th overall pick
- Drafted by: Seattle SuperSonics
- Playing career: 1969–1971
- Position: Center
- Number: 42, 22

Career history
- 1969–1970: Miami Floridians
- 1970–1971: Memphis Pros
- Stats at Basketball Reference

Alfonso Angel Cueto (born August 2, 1946) is a Cuban-born former professional basketball player.

A 6'7" center, Cueto attended Coral Gables Senior High School in Coral Gables, Florida and the University of Tulsa after transferring from St. Gregory's University. He was selected by the Seattle SuperSonics in the tenth round of the 1969 NBA draft, but he never joined the team. Cueto did play two seasons in the American Basketball Association (ABA) as a member of the Miami Floridians and Memphis Pros. He averaged 5.3 points and 4.3 rebounds in his professional career.
