= Willie Scott (basketball) =

American basketball player (1945–2026)

Personal information
- Born: May 24, 1945 Gadsden, Alabama, U.S.
- Died: January 14, 2026 (aged 80)
- Listed height: 6 ft 5 in (1.96 m)
- Listed weight: 210 lb (95 kg)

Career information
- High school: Carver (Gadsden, Alabama)
- College: Alabama State (1965–1969)
- NBA draft: 1969: 2nd round, 29th overall pick
- Drafted by: Baltimore Bullets
- Position: Forward
- Number: 34

Career history
- 1969: Dallas Chaparrals
- Stats at Basketball Reference

Willie Scott (May 24, 1945 – January 14, 2026) was an American professional basketball player.

== Career ==
Scott played in the American Basketball Association for the Dallas Chaparrals during the beginning of the 1969–70 season. Scott scored 13 points in eight career ABA games.

== Death ==
Scott died on January 14, 2026, at the age of 80.
