= Mike Grosso =

American basketball player

Personal information
- Born: September 7, 1947 (age 79) Raritan, New Jersey
- Listed height: 6 ft 9 in (2.06 m)
- Listed weight: 230 lb (104 kg)

Career information
- High school: Bridgewater-Raritan (Raritan, New Jersey)
- College: Louisville (1967–1970)
- NBA draft: 1970: 5th round, 84th overall pick
- Drafted by: Milwaukee Bucks
- Position: Center
- Number: 10

Career history
- 1971–1972: Pittsburgh Condors
- Stats at Basketball Reference

Michael James Grosso (born September 7, 1947) is an American former basketball player.

== Career ==
Grosso played for the Pittsburgh Condors of the American Basketball Association in the 1971–72 season. Previously, he had been drafted by the Philadelphia 76ers in the third round of the 1969 NBA draft, the Kentucky Colonels in the 1969 ABA Draft and the Milwaukee Bucks in the fifth round of the 1970 NBA draft.

After the Pittsburgh Condors disbanded following the 1971–72 ABA season, Grosso was taken by the Carolina Cougars in the 1972 ABA dispersal draft, but the Cougars did not sign him.

Grosso played at the collegiate level at the University of Louisville. He had been recruited by Frank McGuire at the University of South Carolina, but was denied admission by the ACC.
