= Billy Evans (basketball, born 1947) =

American basketball player

Personal information
- Born: March 3, 1947 (age 79)
- Listed height: 6 ft 0 in (1.83 m)
- Listed weight: 170 lb (77 kg)

Career information
- High school: Hillhouse (New Haven, Connecticut)
- College: Boston College (1966–1969)
- NBA draft: 1969: 13th round, 175th overall pick
- Drafted by: Boston Celtics
- Position: Point guard
- Number: 21, 33

Career history
- 1969–1970: New York Nets
- Stats at Basketball Reference

William D. Evans (born March 3, 1947) is a retired professional basketball point guard who played one season in the American Basketball Association (ABA) as a member of the New York Nets (1969–70). He attended Boston College where he was selected by the Boston Celtics during the 13^{th} round of the 1969 NBA draft, but he never played for them. He is the all time assist leader in BC Basketball history.
