= Ed Siudut =

American basketball player

Personal information
- Born: c. 1947
- Died: May 15, 2012 (aged 65) Pittsfield, New Hampshire
- Listed height: 6 ft 7 in (2.01 m)

Career information
- High school: Everett (Everett, Massachusetts)
- College: Holy Cross (1966–1969)
- NBA draft: 1969: 2nd round, 22nd overall pick
- Drafted by: San Francisco Warriors
- Playing career: 1969–1970
- Position: Forward

Career history
- 1969–1970: Pallacanestro Cantù
- Stats at Basketball Reference

Edward F. "Ed" Siudut (c. 1947 – May 15, 2012) was an American professional basketball player. He was drafted by both the National Basketball Association and American Basketball Association, and played professionally in Italy.

== Holy Cross ==
He totaled 1,611 points, 888 rebounds, and averaged 22.4 points per game and 12.3 rebounds per game during his years at Holy Cross (1966–69).

== Personal life ==
Siudut and his wife were married 40 years and had four children. In addition to basketball, Siudut worked as a probation officer and chief probation officer. He also worked for Peace Corps.

== Achievements ==
- First 1,000-point scorer at Everett High School
- Ranks third all-time in points scored at College of the Holy Cross
- Was inducted into the Holy Cross Varsity Club Hall of Fame in 1986
