= Dick Grubar =

American basketball player

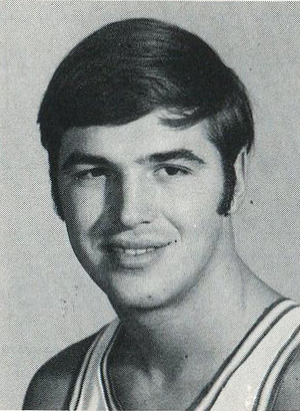
- Grubar as a member of the Indiana Pacers

Personal information
- Born: July 26, 1947 (age 79) Schenectady, New York, U.S.
- Listed height: 6 ft 4 in (1.93 m)
- Listed weight: 184 lb (83 kg)

Career information
- High school: Bishop Gibbons (Schenectady, New York)
- College: North Carolina (1966–1969)
- NBA draft: 1969: 6th round, 83rd overall pick
- Drafted by: Los Angeles Lakers
- Position: Guard
- Number: 15

Career history
- 1969–1970: Indiana Pacers

Career highlights
- Second-team All-ACC (1969)
- Stats at Basketball Reference

Richard Arthur Grubar (born July 26, 1947) is an American former professional basketball player who spent one season in the American Basketball Association (ABA) as a member of the Indiana Pacers during the 1969–70 season. Born in Schenectady, New York, he was drafted out of the University of North Carolina during the 1969 NBA draft in the sixth round (83^{rd} pick overall) by the Los Angeles Lakers, but he never signed with them.
