= Luther Green =

American basketball player (1946–2006)

Luther “Sally” Green
Personal information
- Born: November 13, 1946 New York City, New York, U.S.
- Died: January 25, 2006 (aged 59) Brooklyn, New York, U.S.
- Listed height: 6 ft 7 in (2.01 m)
- Listed weight: 190 lb (86 kg)

Career information
- High school: DeWitt Clinton (The Bronx, New York)
- College: LIU Brooklyn (1966–1969)
- NBA draft: 1969: 3rd round, 41st overall pick
- Drafted by: Cincinnati Royals
- Playing career: 1969–1979
- Position: Small forward
- Number: 27, 14, 25

Career history
- 1969–1971: New York Nets
- 1972–1973: Philadelphia 76ers
- 1973–1974: Hartford Capitols
- 1975–1976: Long Island Sounds
- 1976–1977: Wilkes-Barre Barons
- 1977–1978: Brooklyn Dodgers
- 1978–1979: Wilkes-Barre Barons
- Stats at NBA.com
- Stats at Basketball Reference

Luther Green (November 13, 1946 – January 25, 2006) was an American basketball player.

Born in New York City, Green played college basketball at Long Island University and was selected by the Cincinnati Royals in the third round of the 1969 NBA draft and by the Miami Floridians in the 1969 ABA Draft.

Green played for the New York Nets of the American Basketball Association for two seasons. From 1971 to 1972 he played for the Harlem Wizards, and he played briefly for the National Basketball Association's Philadelphia 76ers during the 1972–73 NBA season.

Green died of lung cancer at the age of 59.
