= Tom Hagan =

American basketball player (born 1947)

Personal information
- Born: January 29, 1947 (age 78) Louisville, Kentucky, U.S.
- Listed height: 6 ft 3 in (1.91 m)
- Listed weight: 185 lb (84 kg)

Career information
- High school: St. Xavier (Louisville, Kentucky)
- College: Vanderbilt (1966–1969)
- NBA draft: 1969: 3rd round, 36th overall pick
- Drafted by: San Francisco Warriors
- Playing career: 1969–1971
- Position: Point guard / shooting guard
- Number: 32, 34

Career history
- 1969–1971: Dallas / Texas Chaparrals
- 1971: Kentucky Colonels

Career highlights
- 3× First-team All-SEC (1967–1969)
- Stats at Basketball Reference

Thomas Medard Hagan (born January 29, 1947) was an American basketball player who played briefly in the original American Basketball Association (ABA).

Hagan played college basketball at Vanderbilt and played for the Dallas Chaparrals and Kentucky Colonels of the ABA. He appeared in 73 total ABA games, averaging 4.9 points and 1.9 assists per game.
