= Bob Arnzen =

American basketball and baseball player

Personal information
- Born: November 3, 1947 (age 79) Covington, Kentucky, U.S.
- Listed height: 6 ft 5 in (1.96 m)
- Listed weight: 205 lb (93 kg)

Career information
- High school: St. Xavier (Cincinnati, Ohio)
- College: Notre Dame (1966–1969)
- NBA draft: 1969: 8th round, 103rd overall pick
- Drafted by: Detroit Pistons
- Playing career: 1969–1974
- Position: Small forward
- Number: 12, 30, 21, 22

Career history
- 1969–1970: New York Nets
- 1970–1971: Cincinnati Royals
- 1972–1974: Indiana Pacers

Career highlights
- ABA champion (1973)
- Stats at NBA.com
- Stats at Basketball Reference

Robert Louis Arnzen (born November 3, 1947) is an American former basketball and baseball player.

Born in Covington, Kentucky, Arnzen graduated from St. Xavier High School in Cincinnati, Ohio in 1965. He then played collegiately for the University of Notre Dame.

Arnzen was selected by the Detroit Pistons in the 8th round (93rd pick overall) of the 1969 NBA draft. He played for the New York Nets (1969–70), and Indiana Pacers (1972–74) in the ABA for 56 games (winning the 1972–73 ABA Championship) and for the Cincinnati Royals (1970–71) in the NBA for 55 games.

Arnzen additionally played Minor League Baseball for the Gulf Coast Expos (1969), West Palm Beach Expos (1969–71), Winnipeg Whips (1971), Québec Carnavals (1972), and Peninsula Whips (1972).

== Career statistics ==
Legend
GP	Games played	GS	Games started	MPG	Minutes per game
FG%	Field goal percentage	3P%	3-point field goal percentage	FT%	Free throw percentage
RPG	Rebounds per game	APG	Assists per game	SPG	Steals per game
BPG	Blocks per game	PPG	Points per game	**Bold**	Career high

†	Denotes seasons in which Brown's team won an ABA championship

=== NBA/ABA ===
==== Regular season ====
Year	Team	GP	GS	MPG	FG%	3P%	FT%	RPG	APG	SPG	BPG	PPG
1969–70	New York (ABA)	13		7.5	.396	–	.333	1.7	**.4**			3.1
1970–71	Cincinnati (NBA)	**55**		**10.8**	.462	–	**.865**	**2.8**	**.4**			**5.5**
1972–73†	Indiana (ABA)	23		4.8	**.526**	.000	.750	1.0	.1			2.0
1973–74	Indiana (ABA)	20		7.5	.500	**1.000**	.778	1.0	.2	.2	.1	2.8
Career (ABA)		56		6.4	.470	.200	.652	1.2	.2	.2	.1	2.5
Career (overall)		111		8.6	.465	.000	.800	2.0	.3	.2	.1	4.0

==== Playoffs ====
Year	Team	GP	GS	MPG	FG%	3P%	FT%	RPG	APG	SPG	BPG	PPG
1972–73†	Indiana (ABA)	7		1.9	.500	.000	1.000	.0	.0			1.0
