= Bill Bunting =

American basketball player (born 1947)

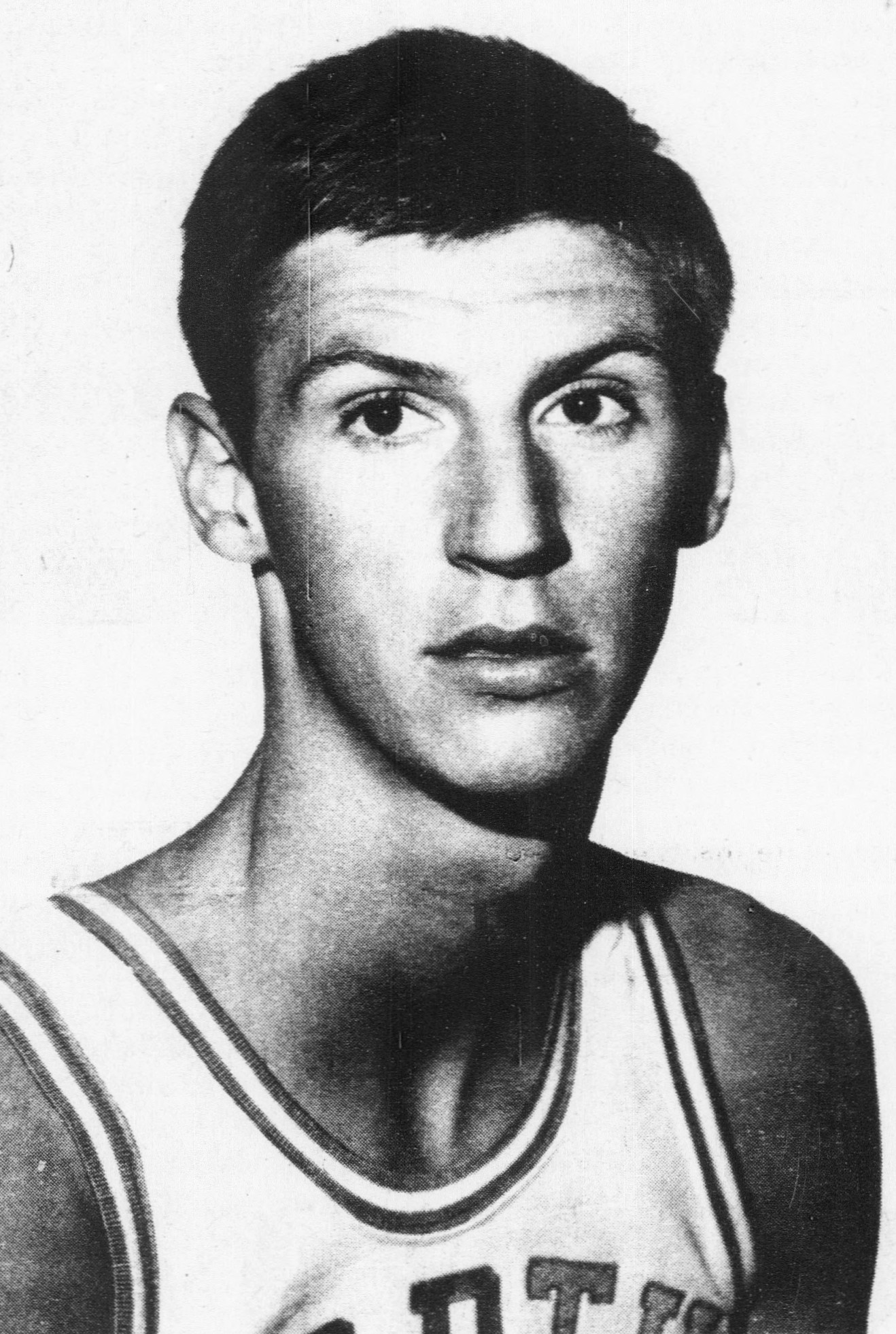
- Bunting, circa 1969

Personal information
- Born: August 26, 1947 (age 78) New Bern, North Carolina, U.S.
- Listed height: 6 ft 8 in (2.03 m)
- Listed weight: 200 lb (91 kg)

Career information
- High school: New Bern (New Bern, North Carolina)
- College: North Carolina (1966–1969)
- NBA draft: 1969: 2nd round, 26th overall pick
- Drafted by: New York Knicks
- Position: Small forward
- Number: 42, 15, 3, 16

Career history
- 1969–1970: Carolina Cougars
- 1970–1971: New York Nets
- 1971–1972: Virginia Squires

Career highlights
- First-team All-ACC (1969)
- Stats at Basketball Reference

William Carl Bunting (born August 26, 1947) is an American former basketball player.

Born in New Bern, North Carolina, he played collegiately for the University of North Carolina.

He was selected by the New York Knicks in the second round (26th pick overall) of the 1969 NBA draft and by the Miami Floridians in the 1969 ABA Draft.

He played for the Carolina Cougars (1969–70), New York Nets (1970) and Virginia Squires (1970–72) in the American Basketball Association for 145 games.
