= Jim Glass =

American basketball player

Personal information
- Born: September 10, 1919 Ossian, Indiana, U.S.
- Died: February 8, 1972 (aged 52) Fort Wayne, Indiana, U.S.
- Listed height: 6 ft 8 in (2.03 m)
- Listed weight: 210 lb (95 kg)

Career information
- High school: South Side (Fort Wayne, Indiana)
- Position: Center

Career history
- 1944–1945: Fort Wayne Zollner Pistons

Career highlights
- NBL champion (1945)

James Elwin Glass (September 10, 1919 – February 8, 1972) was an American professional basketball player. He played for the Fort Wayne Zollner Pistons of the National Basketball League in 1944–45, averaged 0.5 points per game, and won the NBL championship.

Glass attended the University of Toledo for one year and played on the freshman basketball team. He also fought in World War II.
