= Simmie Hill =

American basketball player (1946–2013)

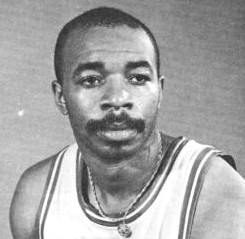

Personal information
- Born: November 14, 1946 Midland, Pennsylvania, U.S.
- Died: July 14, 2013 (aged 66) Pittsburgh, Pennsylvania, U.S.
- Listed height: 6 ft 7 in (2.01 m)
- Listed weight: 233 lb (106 kg)

Career information
- High school: Midland (Midland, Pennsylvania)
- College: Cameron (1966–1967); West Texas A&M (1967–1969)
- NBA draft: 1969: 2nd round, 16th overall pick
- Drafted by: Chicago Bulls
- Playing career: 1969–1974
- Position: Small forward
- Number: 54, 34

Career history
- 1969: Los Angeles Stars
- 1969–1970: Miami Floridians
- 1970–1971: Delaware Blue Bombers
- 1971–1972: Dallas Chaparrals
- 1972–1973: San Diego Conquistadors
- 1973–1974: San Antonio Spurs

Career highlights
- First-team Parade All-American (1965)
- Stats at Basketball Reference

Simmie Hill Jr. (November 14, 1946 – July 14, 2013) was an American professional basketball player. At 6'7", he played the forward position.

Born in Midland, Pennsylvania, Hill attended Midland High School, where he starred on the school's basketball team alongside Norm Van Lier. During his senior year, Hill scored 652 points and led the Midland Leopards to the Pennsylvania State Championship. He spent his college career at Wichita State University (where he played on the freshman team as first year students were not eligible to play varsity basketball at that time), Cameron Junior College and West Texas State University, and after his senior year was named a first team All American by The Sporting News. Hill then played four seasons in the American Basketball Association as a member of the Los Angeles Stars, Miami Floridians, Dallas Chaparrals, San Diego Conquistadors, and San Antonio Spurs. He averaged 9.7 points per game in his ABA career.

Hill played for the Delaware Blue Bombers of the Eastern Basketball Association (EBA) during the 1970–71 season.
