= Oklahoma City Thunder draft history =

Overview of the Oklahoma City Thunder's draft picks

Below is a list of draft pick selections made by the Oklahoma City Thunder of the National Basketball Association (NBA). The Thunder's predecessor was the Seattle SuperSonics, formed in 1967. The team remained in Seattle before relocating to Oklahoma City in 2008. As a franchise, the team has made 289 draft selections – 40 as the Thunder and 249 as the Sonics.

== Draft history ==
=== Key ===
^	Denotes player who has been inducted to the Naismith Memorial Basketball Hall of Fame
*	Denotes player who has been selected for at least one All-Star Game and All-NBA Team
+	Denotes player who has been selected for at least one All-Star Game
x	Denotes player who has been selected for at least one All-Star Team
≠	Denotes player who has been selected for the All-Rookie Team
#	Denotes player who has never appeared in an NBA regular season or playoff game

=== Picks ===
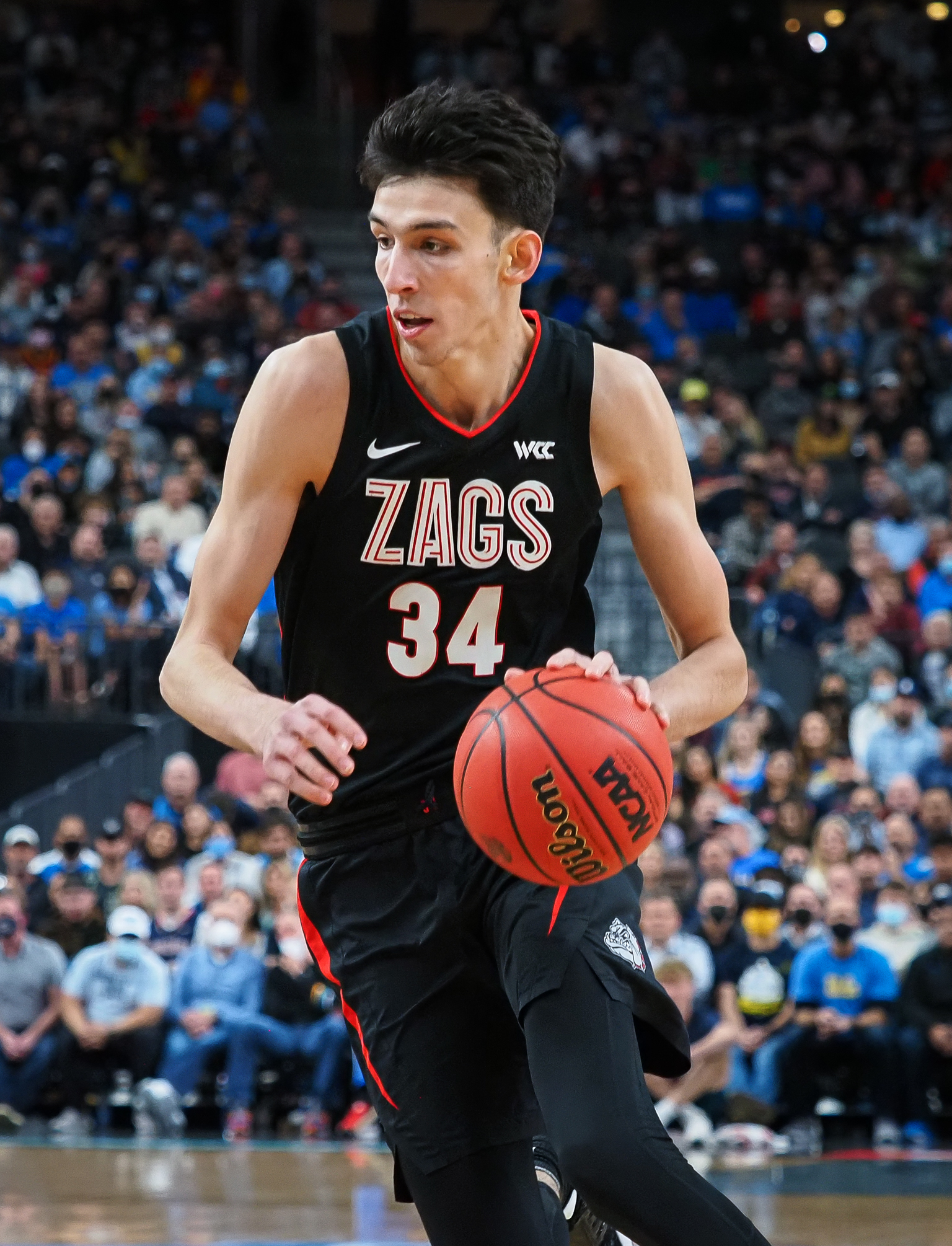
Chet Holmgren was selected 2nd overall out of Gonzaga.

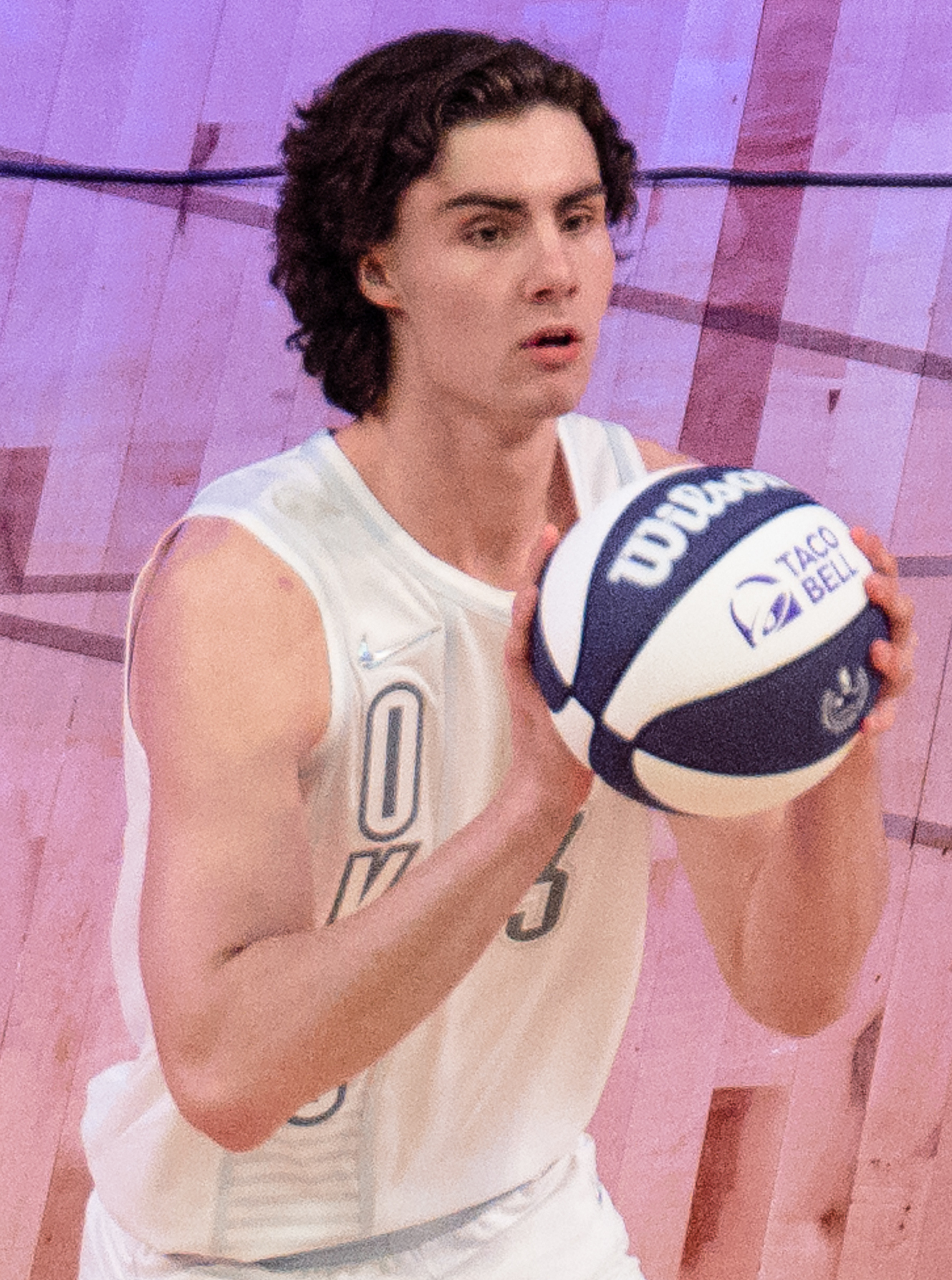
Josh Giddey was selected 6th overall out of the Adelaide 36ers (NBL).

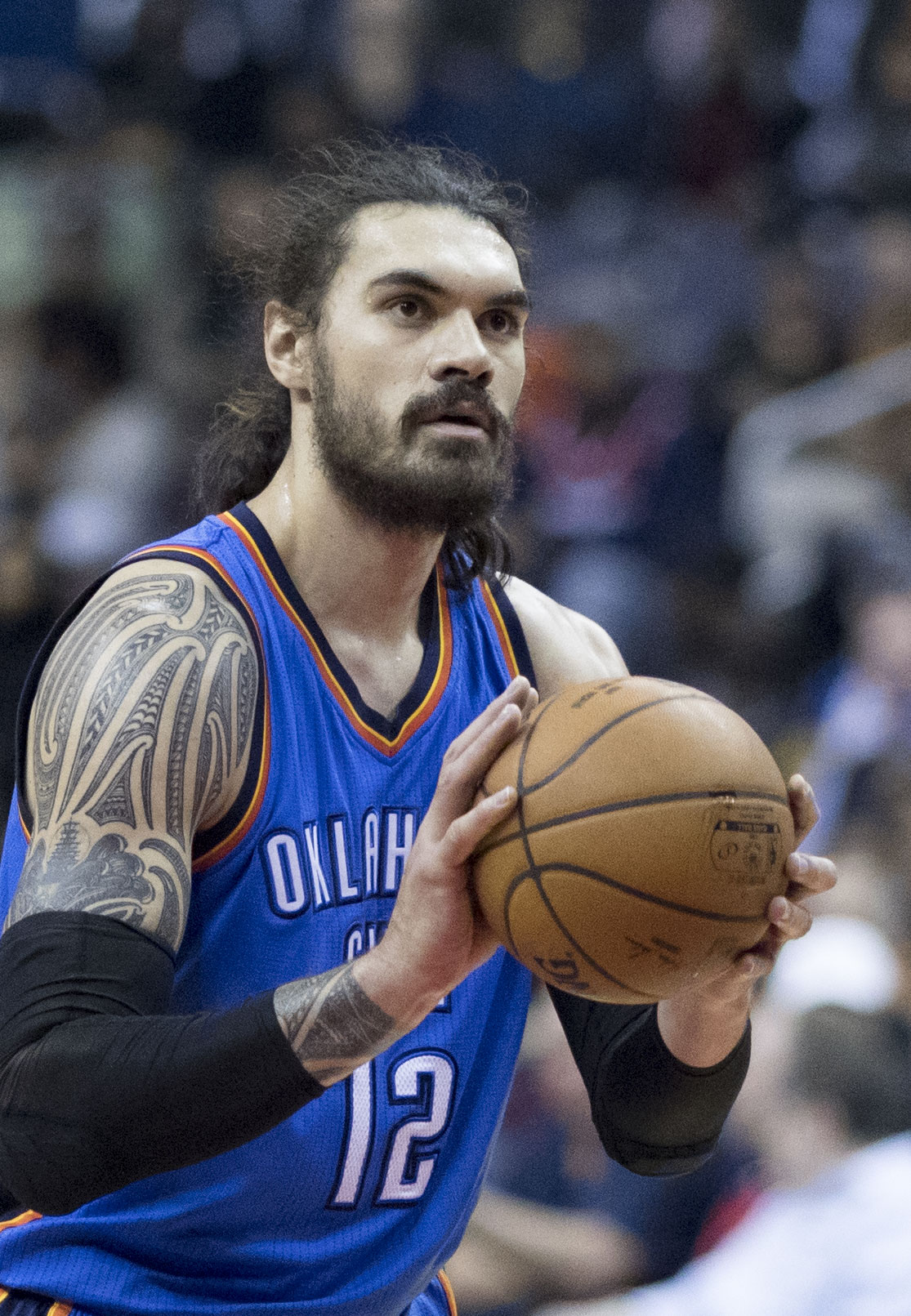
Steven Adams was selected 12th overall out of Pittsburgh.

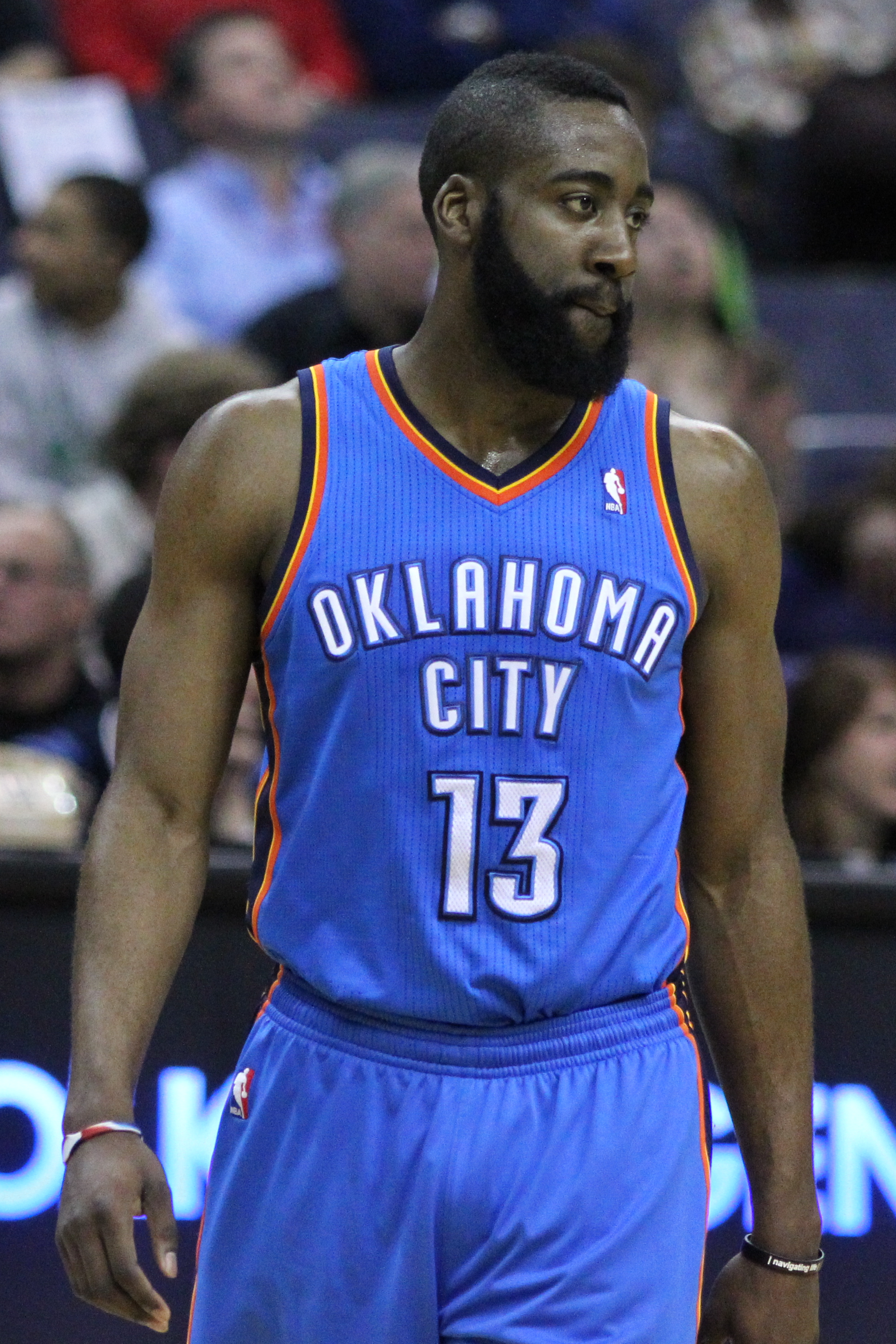
James Harden was selected 3rd overall out of Arizona State.

Oklahoma City Thunder
Year	Round	Pick	Player	Position	Nationality	School/Club
2026	2	37	Ryan Conwell (traded to Miami)	SG	United States	Louisville
2026	1	17	Ebuka Okorie (traded to Memphis)	PG	United States	Stanford
2026	1	12	Aday Mara	C	Spain	Michigan
2025	2	44	Brooks Barnhizer	SG	United States	Northwestern
2025	1	24	Nique Clifford (traded to Sacramento)	SG	United States	Colorado State
2025	1	15	Thomas Sorber	C	United States	Georgetown
2024	1	12	Nikola Topić	PG	Serbia	KK Crvena zvezda (Serbia)
2023	2	50	Keyontae Johnson	SG	United States	Kansas State
2023	2	37	Hunter Tyson (traded to Denver)	SF	United States	Clemson
2023	1	12	Dereck Lively II≠ (traded to Dallas)	C	United States	Duke
2022	2	34	Jaylin Williams	C	United States	Arkansas
2022	1	30	Peyton Watson (traded to Denver)	PF	United States	UCLA
2022	1	12	Jalen Williams*	SG	United States	Santa Clara
2022	1	2	Chet Holmgren≠	PF	United States	Gonzaga
2021	2	55	Aaron Wiggins	SG	United States	Maryland
2021	2	36	Miles McBride (traded to New York)	PG	United States	West Virginia
2021	2	34	Rokas Jokubaitis# (traded to New York)	PG	Lithuania	FC Barcelona (Spain)
2021	1	18	Tre Mann	PG	United States	Florida
2021	1	16	Alperen Şengün (traded to Houston)	C	Turkey	Beşiktaş
2021	1	6	Josh Giddey≠	PG	Australia	(Australia) Adelaide 36ers (NBL)
2020	2	53	Cassius Winston (traded to Washington)	PG	United States	Michigan State
2020	1	25	Immanuel Quickley≠ (traded to New York)	PG	United States	Kentucky
2019	1	21	Brandon Clarke≠ (traded to Memphis)	PF	Canada	Gonzaga
2018	2	57	Kevin Hervey	PF	United States	Texas-Arlington
2018	2	53	Devon Hall	SG	United States	Virginia
2017	1	21	Terrance Ferguson	SG	United States	(Australia) Adelaide 36ers (NBL)
2015	2	48	Dakari Johnson	C	United States	Kentucky
2015	1	14	Cameron Payne	PG	United States	Murray State
2014	1	29	Josh Huestis	SF	United States	Stanford
2014	1	21	Mitch McGary	PF	United States	Michigan
2013	2	32	Alex Abrines	SG	Spain	FC Barcelona (Spain)
2013	1	29	Archie Goodwin (traded to Golden State)	SG	United States	Kentucky
2013	1	12	Steven Adams≠	C	New Zealand	Pittsburgh
2012	1	28	Perry Jones	SF	United States	Baylor
2011	1	24	Reggie Jackson	PG	United States	Boston College
2010	2	51	Magnum Rolle# (traded to Indiana)	PF	Bahamas	Louisiana Tech
2010	1	26	Quincy Pondexter (traded to New Orleans)	SF	United States	Washington
2010	1	21	Craig Brackins (traded to New Orleans)	PF	United States	Iowa State
2010	1	18	Eric Bledsoe≠ (traded to LA Clippers)	SG	United States	Kentucky
2009	1	25	Rodrigue Beaubois (traded to Dallas)	PG	France	Cholet (France)
2009	1	3	James Harden*	SG	United States	Arizona State
Seattle SuperSonics
Year	Round	Pick	Player	Position	Nationality	School/Club
2008	2	56	Sasha Kaun	C	Russia	Kansas
2008	2	50	DeVon Hardin#	C	United States	California
2008	2	46	Trent Plaisted#	PF	United States	BYU
2008	2	32	Walter Sharpe	PF	United States	UAB
2008	1	24	Serge Ibaka≠	PF	Republic of the Congo; Spain	L'Hospitalet (Spain)
2008	1	4	Russell Westbrook*	PG	United States	UCLA
2007	2	35	Glen Davis	PF	United States	LSU
2007	2	31	Carl Landry≠	PF	United States	Purdue
2007	1	2	Kevin Durant*	SF	United States	Texas
2006	2	53	Yotam Halperin#	SG	Israel	Union Olimpija (Slovenia)
2006	2	40	Denham Brown#	SG	Canada	UConn
2006	1	10	Mouhamed Sene	C	Senegal	Verviers-Pepinster (Belgium)
2005	2	55	Lawrence Roberts	PF	United States	Mississippi State
2005	2	48	Mickaël Gelabale	SF	France	Real Madrid (Spain)
2005	1	25	Johan Petro	C	France	Pau-Orthez (France)
2004	2	41	David Young#	SF	United States	North Carolina Central
2004	2	35	Andre Emmett	SG	United States	Texas Tech
2004	1	12	Robert Swift	C	United States	Bakersfield HS (Bakersfield, CA)
2003	2	41	Willie Green	SG	United States	Detroit
2003	1	14	Luke Ridnour	PG	United States	Oregon
2003	1	12	Nick Collison	PF	United States	Kansas
2002	2	48	Peter Fehse#	PF	Germany	Halle (Germany)
2001	2	41	Bobby Simmons	SF	United States	DePaul
2001	2	39	Earl Watson	PG	United States	UCLA
2001	1	12	Vladimir Radmanović≠	PF	Yugoslavia	(Socialist Federal Republic of Yugoslavia) FMP Železnik (Yugoslavia)
2000	2	47	Josip Sesar#	SG	Yugoslavia	Cibona Zagreb (Croatia)
2000	2	42	Olumide Oyedeji	C	Nigeria	Würzburg (Germany)
2000	1	17	Desmond Mason	SF	United States	Oklahoma State
1999	1	13	Corey Maggette	SF	United States	Duke
1998	2	33	Jelani McCoy	PF	United States	UCLA
1998	2	32	Rashard Lewis+	SF	United States	Alief Elsik HS (Houston, TX)
1998	1	27	Vladimir Stepania	C	Georgia	Union Olimpija (Slovenia)
1997	2	54	Mark Blount	C	United States	Pittsburgh
1997	2	40	Ed Elisma#	PF	United States	Georgia Tech
1997	1	23	Bobby Jackson≠	PG	United States	Minnesota
1996	2	57	Drew Barry	SG	United States	Georgia Tech
1996	2	47	Ron Riley#	SF	United States	Arizona State
1996	2	45	Joe Vogel#	C	United States	Colorado State
1996	2	35	Joseph Blair#	PF	United States	Arizona

Draft year	League	Round	Pick	Player	College/High School/Club
1995	NBA	1	26	Sherell Ford	UIC
1995	NBA	2	54	Eurelijus Žukauskas	BC Neptūnas (Lithuania)
1994	NBA	1	11	Carlos Rogers	Tennessee State
1994	NBA	2	37	Dontonio Wingfield	Cincinnati
1994	NBA	2	54	Željko Rebrača	KK Partizan (Serbia)
1993	NBA	1	23	Ervin Johnson	New Orleans
1993	NBA	2	42	Adonis Jordan	Kansas
1992	NBA	1	17	Doug Christie	Pepperdine
1992	NBA	2	45	Chris King	Wake Forest
1991	NBA	1	14	Rich King	Nebraska
1990	NBA	1	2	Gary Payton	Oregon State
1990	NBA	2	38	Jud Buechler	Arizona
1990	NBA	2	53	Abdul Shamsid-Deen	Providence
1989	NBA	1	16	Dana Barros	Boston College
1989	NBA	1	17	Shawn Kemp	Trinity Valley Community College
1988	NBA	1	15	Gary Grant	Michigan
1988	NBA	3	65	Corey Gaines	Loyola Marymount
1987	NBA	1	5	Scottie Pippen	Central Arkansas
1987	NBA	1	9	Derrick McKey	Alabama
1987	NBA	3	55	Tommy Amaker	Duke
1987	NBA	4	78	Todd Linder	Tampa
1987	NBA	5	101	Michael Tait	Clemson
1987	NBA	6	124	Tom Gneiting	BYU
1987	NBA	7	147	Mike Giomi	North Carolina State
1986	NBA	2	30	Nate McMillan	North Carolina State
1986	NBA	2	38	Lemone Lampley	DePaul
1986	NBA	3	53	Tod Murphy	UC Irvine
1986	NBA	4	76	Michael Graham	Georgetown
1986	NBA	5	99	Dominic Pressley	Boston College
1986	NBA	6	122	Curtis Kitchen	South Florida
1986	NBA	7	145	Glen McCants	Clemson
1985	NBA	1	4	Xavier McDaniel	Wichita State
1985	NBA	3	53	Rolando Lamb	Virginia Commonwealth
1985	NBA	4	75	Alex Stivrins	Colorado
1985	NBA	5	97	Lou Stefanovic	Illinois State
1985	NBA	6	122	Earl Walker	Mercer
1985	NBA	7	144	Michael Phelps	Alcorn State
1984	NBA	2	28	Cory Blackwell	Wisconsin
1984	NBA	2	39	Danny Young	Wake Forest
1984	NBA	3	52	Terry Williams	Alabama
1984	NBA	4	83	Jeff Jenkins	Xavier
1984	NBA	5	106	Eli Pasquale	Victoria (Canada)
1984	NBA	6	129	Graylin Warner	Southwestern Louisiana
1984	NBA	7	152	Gary Gatewood	Oregon
1984	NBA	8	175	Jerry McMillan	DePaul
1984	NBA	9	197	Mike Williams	Idaho State
1984	NBA	10	219	Greg Brandon	Creighton
1983	NBA	1	16	Jon Sundvold	Missouri
1983	NBA	2	36	Scooter McCray	Louisville
1983	NBA	3	63	Frank Burnell	Stetson University
1983	NBA	4	86	Pete DeBisschop	Fairfield University
1983	NBA	5	109	Brad Watson	University of Washington
1983	NBA	6	132	Tony Wilson	Western Kentucky University
1983	NBA	7	155	Tony Gattis	Mercer University
1983	NBA	8	178	Ray Smith	Armstrong Atlantic State University
1983	NBA	9	200	Tony Washington	Hampton University
1983	NBA	10	221	David Binion	North Carolina Central University
1982	NBA	3	65	John Greig	University of Oregon
1982	NBA	4	88	Ken Owens	University of Idaho
1982	NBA	5	111	Rod Camp	Southern Illinois University
1982	NBA	6	134	Bobby Potts	University of North Carolina at Charlotte
1982	NBA	7	157	Allen Rayhorn	Northern Illinois University
1982	NBA	8	180	Steve Burks	University of Washington
1981	NBA	1	5	Danny Vranes	University of Utah
1981	NBA	3	53	Mark Radford	Oregon State University
1981	NBA	5	99	Andra Griffin	University of Washington
1981	NBA	6	122	Earl Banks	Auburn University
1981	NBA	7	145	Tom Sienkiewicz	Villanova University
1980	NBA	1	20	Bill Hanzlik	University of Notre Dame
1980	NBA	3	66	Carl Bailey	Tuskegee University
1980	NBA	4	89	Gary Hooker	Murray State University
1980	NBA	5	112	Lenny Horton	Georgia Institute of Technology
1980	NBA	6	135	Jim Strickland	University of South Carolina
1980	NBA	7	158	Carl Ervin	Seattle University
1980	NBA	8	176	Al Dutch	Georgetown University
1980	NBA	9	197	Jim Tillman	Eastern Kentucky University
1980	NBA	10	212	Kent Williams	Texas Tech University
1979	NBA	1	6	James Bailey	Rutgers University
1979	NBA	1	7	Vinnie Johnson	Baylor University
1979	NBA	2	43	Johnny Moore	University of Texas at Austin
1979	NBA	4	73	James Donaldson	Washington State University
1979	NBA	4	87	Richie Allen	California State University, Dominguez Hills
1978	NBA	2	39	James Lee	University of Kentucky
1978	NBA	2	42	Keven McDonald	University of Pennsylvania
1978	NBA	3	61	Dave Baxter	University of Michigan
1978	NBA	4	83	Billy Lewis	Illinois State University
1978	NBA	5	105	Ralph Drollinger	University of California, Los Angeles
1977	NBA	1	8	Jack Sikma	Illinois Wesleyan University
1977	NBA	3	52	Joe Hassett	Providence College
1977	NBA	4	74	Jim Cooper	University of Alabama
1977	NBA	5	96	Dale Haberman	McKendree College
1977	NBA	6	118	Bucky O'Brien	Seattle University
1977	NBA	7	138	Billy Reynolds	Northwestern State University
1977	NBA	8	158	Jeff Frey	University of Evansville
1976	NBA	1	11	Bob Wilkerson	Indiana University
1976	NBA	2	19	Bayard Forrest	Grand Canyon University
1976	NBA	2	29	Dennis Johnson	Pepperdine University
1976	NBA	4	63	Willie Parr	LeMoyne–Owen College
1976	NBA	5	80	Robert Gray	Wichita State University
1976	NBA	6	98	Darrell Peterson	Wake Forest University
1976	NBA	7	116	Mark Klein	Malone College
1976	NBA	8	134	Norton Barnhill	Washington State University
1976	NBA	9	151	Ron Johnson	North Carolina Agricultural and Technical State University
1976	NBA	10	167	Ricky Lewis	Alcorn State University
1975	NBA	1	12	Frank Oleynick	Seattle University
1975	NBA	2	21	Bruce Seals	Xavier University of Louisiana
1975	NBA	4	66	Jim Moore	Utah State University
1975	NBA	5	84	Dwain Govan	Bishop College
1975	NBA	6	102	Larry Smith	North Carolina Agricultural and Technical State University
1975	NBA	7	120	Hollis Miller	Drury University
1975	NBA	8	138	Ken McKenzie	University of Montana
1975	NBA	9	155	Rich Haws	Utah State University
1975	NBA	10	170	Jerry Bellotti	Santa Clara University
1974	NBA	1	3	Tom Burleson	North Carolina State University
1974	NBA	2	26	Leonard Gray	California State University, Long Beach
1974	NBA	3	44	Tal Skinner	University of Maryland Eastern Shore
1974	NBA	4	62	William Gordon	University of Maryland Eastern Shore
1974	NBA	5	80	Dean Tolson	University of Arkansas
1974	NBA	6	98	Wardell Jackson	Ohio State University
1974	NBA	7	116	Jerry Faulkner	State University of West Georgia
1974	NBA	8	134	Leonard Coulter	Morehead State University
1974	NBA	9	152	Bertrand du Pont	Dillard University
1974	NBA	10	169	Rod Derline	Seattle University
1973	NBA	1	4	Mike Green	Louisiana Tech University
1973	NBA	4	56	June Harris	North Carolina Agricultural and Technical State University
1973	NBA	5	73	Chuck Iverson	University of South Dakota
1973	NBA	6	90	Bill McCoy	University of Northern Iowa
1973	NBA	7	107	Jim Andrews	University of Kentucky
1973	NBA	8	124	Wardell Jeffries	Oklahoma Baptist University
1973	NBA	9	141	Greg Williams	Seattle University
1973	NBA	10	155	Bob Bodell	University of Maryland
1972	NBA	1	7	Bud Stallworth	University of Kansas
1972	NBA	2	18	Joby Wright	Indiana University
1972	NBA	2	23	Brian Taylor	Princeton University
1972	NBA	3	40	Jim Creighton	University of Colorado
1972	NBA	4	57	Joe Mackey	University of Southern California
1972	NBA	5	73	Gary Ladd	Seattle University
1972	NBA	6	90	Ronald Thomas	University of Louisville
1972	NBA	7	107	Jerry Dunn	Western Kentucky University
1972	NBA	8	123	Willy Stoudamire	Portland State University
1972	NBA	9	138	Dwight Holliday	University of Hawaii
1972	NBA	10	151	Dan Stewart	Washington State University
1972	NBA	11	162	Steve Turner	Vanderbilt University
1972	NBA	12	171	Gregg Daust	University of Missouri–St. Louis
1972	NBA	14	185	Cleveland Hill	Nicholls State University
1971	NBA	1	6	Fred Brown	University of Iowa
1971	NBA	2	23	Jim McDaniels	Western Kentucky University
1971	NBA	4	57	Pembroke Burrows	Jacksonville University
1971	NBA	5	74	Jeff Smith	New Mexico State University
1971	NBA	6	91	Mike Neciase	William Carey College
1971	NBA	7	108	John Duncan	Kentucky Wesleyan College
1971	NBA	8	125	Charlie Lowery	University of Puget Sound
1971	NBA	9	141	Larry Holliday	University of Oregon
1971	NBA	10	157	Ed Huston	University of Puget Sound
1971	NBA	11	173	Jerome Perry	Western Kentucky University
1970	NBA	1	6	Jim Ard	University of Cincinnati
1970	NBA	2	20	Jake Ford	University of Maryland Eastern Shore
1970	NBA	2	23	Pete Cross	University of San Francisco
1970	NBA	3	40	Gar Heard	University of Oklahoma
1970	NBA	5	74	Boyd Lynch	Eastern Kentucky University
1970	NBA	6	91	Samuel Robinson	California State University, Long Beach
1970	NBA	7	108	James Morgan	University of Maryland
1970	NBA	8	125	George Irvine	University of Washington
1970	NBA	9	142	Claude Virden	Murray State University
1970	NBA	10	159	Chuck Lloyd	Yankton College
1970	NBA	11	174	Andy Owens	University of Florida
1970	NBA	12	187	John Brunson	Furman University
1970	NBA	13	197	Allen McManus	Winston-Salem State University
1970	NBA	14	207	Dan Beeson	Linfield College
1969	NBA	1	3	Lucius Allen	University of California, Los Angeles
1969	NBA	2	18	Ronald Taylor	University of Southern California
1969	NBA	3	32	Lee Winfield	North Texas State University
1969	NBA	4	46	Hal Booker	Cheyney University of Pennsylvania
1969	NBA	5	60	Jerry King	University of Louisville
1969	NBA	6	74	Ben McGilmer	University of Iowa
1969	NBA	7	88	Greg Wittman	Western Carolina University
1969	NBA	8	102	Theartis Wallace	Central Washington University
1969	NBA	9	116	Vince Fritz	Oregon State University
1969	NBA	10	130	Al Cueto	University of Tulsa
1969	NBA	11	144	Jim Connolly	Bowling Green State University
1969	NBA	12	158	John Smith	University of Puget Sound
1969	NBA	13	171	Bob Burrow	Seattle Pacific University
1969	NBA	14	182	Jerry Conley	Morehead State University
1969	NBA	15	191	Ernie Powell	University of Southern California
1969	NBA	16	197	Danny Cornett	Morehead State University
1969	NBA	17	203	Steve Honeycutt	Kansas State University
1968	NBA	1	3	Bob Kauffman	Guilford College
1968	NBA	2	16	Art Harris	Stanford University
1968	NBA	3	24	Jeff Ockel	University of Utah
1968	NBA	3	34	Ed Johnson	Tennessee State University
1968	NBA	4	38	Henry Logan	Western Carolina University
1968	NBA	5	52	Al Hairston	Bowling Green State University
1968	NBA	6	66	Ron Guziak	Duquesne University
1968	NBA	7	80	Jim McKean	Washington State University
1968	NBA	8	94	Willie Rogers	University of Oklahoma
1968	NBA	9	108	Jimmy Smith	Utah State University
1968	NBA	10	122	Joe Kennedy	Duke University
1968	NBA	11	136	Jim Marsh	University of Southern California
1968	NBA	12	149	Walt Simon	University of Utah
1968	NBA	13	162	Bud Ogden	Santa Clara University
1968	NBA	14	173	Mike Warren	University of California, Los Angeles
1967	NBA	1	6	Al Tucker	Oklahoma Baptist University
1967	NBA	2	19	Bob Rule	Colorado State University
1967	NBA	3	30	Sam Singleton	University of Nebraska at Omaha
1967	NBA	4	43	Larry Bunce	Utah State University
1967	NBA	5	54	Plummer Lott	Seattle University
1967	NBA	6	67	Gordon Harris	University of Washington
1967	NBA	7	78	Dick Kolbert	University of California, Santa Barbara
1967	NBA	8	91	Willie Wolters	Boston College
1967	NBA	9	101	Roderick McDonald	Whitworth College
1967	NBA	10	113	Gary Lechman	Gonzaga University
1967	NBA	11	122	Randy Matson	Texas A&M University
1967	NBA	12	133	Rubin Russell	North Texas State University
1967	NBA	13	140	John Schroeder	Ohio University
1967	NBA	14	147	Jim Sutherland	Clemson University
1967	NBA	15	152	Willie Campbell	University of Nebraska
