= List of Oklahoma City Thunder seasons =

The Oklahoma City Thunder are a professional basketball team based in Oklahoma City, Oklahoma. They play in the National Basketball Association (NBA) and are a member of the NBA Western Conference's Northwest Division. The Thunder were founded in 1967 as the Seattle SuperSonics as one of two franchises that joined the NBA in the 1967–68 season. The SuperSonics moved to Oklahoma City after the 2007–08 season. The records from the decades the team was in Seattle are still attached to the Oklahoma City history, but will be transferred back to a new Seattle SuperSonics team when and if NBA expansion there is approved.

Overall, the Thunder have qualified for the NBA playoffs on ten occasions after being relocated from Seattle (22 times as the SuperSonics). They reached the Western Conference finals seven times, reaching the NBA Finals in 1978, 1979, 1996, 2012 and 2025. Their only championship while in Seattle came during the 1979 NBA Finals against the Washington Bullets, while their first title in Oklahoma City was in the 2025 NBA Finals against the Indiana Pacers.

== Table key ==
ASG MVP	All-Star Game Most Valuable Player
COY	Coach of the Year
DPOY	Defensive Player of the Year
Finish	Final position in league or division standings
GB	Games behind first-place team in division (Note: The formula is: $\scriptstyle \mathrm{Games}\ \mathrm{behind} = \frac{(\mathrm{Team A's}\ \mathrm{wins}-\mathrm{Team B's}\ \mathrm{wins}) + (\mathrm{Team B's}\ \mathrm{losses} - \mathrm{Team A's}\ \mathrm{losses})}{\mathrm{2}}$)
L	Number of regular season losses
EOY	Executive of the Year
FMVP	Finals Most Valuable Player
JWKC	J. Walter Kennedy Citizenship
MIP	Most Improved Player
ROY	Rookie of the Year
SIX	Sixth Man of the Year
SPOR	Sportsmanship Award
W	Number of regular season wins

== Seasons ==
NBA champions	Conference champions	Division champions	Playoff berth	Play-in berth

Season	Team	Conference	Conf. Finish	Division	Div. Finish	Wins	Losses	Win%	GB	Playoffs	Awards	Head coach
Seattle SuperSonics
1967–68	1967–68 (Note: The team began as the Seattle SuperSonics.)	—	—	Western	5th	23	59	.280	33			Al Bianchi
1968–69	1968–69	—	—	Western	6th	30	52	.366	25			Al Bianchi
1969–70	1969–70	—	—	Western	5th	36	46	.439	12			Lenny Wilkens
1970–71	1970–71	Western	8th	Pacific	4th	38	44	.463	10		Lenny Wilkens (ASG MVP)	Lenny Wilkens
1971–72	1971–72	Western	6th	Pacific	3rd	47	35	.537	22			Lenny Wilkens
1972–73	1972–73	Western	8th	Pacific	4th	26	56	.317	34			Tom Nissalke; Bucky Buckwalter
1973–74	1973–74	Western	6th	Pacific	3rd	36	46	.439	11			Bill Russell
1974–75	1974–75	Western	4th	Pacific	2nd	43	39	.524	5	Won First round (Pistons) 2–1; Lost Conference semifinals (Warriors) 4–2		Bill Russell
1975–76	1975–76	Western	3rd	Pacific	2nd	43	39	.524	16	Lost conference semifinals (Suns) 4–2	Slick Watts (JWKC)	Bill Russell
1976–77	1976–77	Western	7th	Pacific	4th	40	42	.488	13			Bill Russell
1977–78	1977–78	Western	4th	Pacific	3rd	47	35	.549	11	Won First round (Lakers) 2–1; Won Conference semifinals (Trail Blazers) 4–2; Won Conference finals (Nuggets) 4–2; Lost NBA Finals (Bullets) 4–3		Bob Hopkins; Lenny Wilkens
1978–79	1978–79	Western	1st	Pacific	1st	52	30	.634	—	Won conference semifinals (Lakers) 4–1; Won Conference finals (Suns) 4–3; Won NBA Finals (Bullets) 4–1	Dennis Johnson (FMVP)	Lenny Wilkens
1979–80	1979–80	Western	3rd	Pacific	2nd	56	26	.683	4	Won First round (Trail Blazers) 2–1; Won Conference semifinals (Bucks) 4–3; Lost Conference finals (Lakers) 4–1		Lenny Wilkens
1980–81	1980–81	Western	10th	Pacific	6th	34	48	.415	23			Lenny Wilkens
1981–82	1981–82	Western	3rd	Pacific	2nd	52	30	.634	5	Won First round (Rockets) 2–1; Lost Conference semifinals (Spurs) 4–1	Gus Williams (CPOY)	Lenny Wilkens
1982–83	1982–83	Western	4th	Pacific	3rd	48	34	.585	10	Lost First round (Trail Blazers) 2–0	Zollie Volchok (EOY)	Lenny Wilkens
1983–84	1983–84	Western	5th	Pacific	3rd	42	40	.512	12	Lost First round (Mavericks) 3–2		Lenny Wilkens
1984–85	1984–85	Western	10th	Pacific	4th (Note: Though the SuperSonics had the same record as the Los Angeles Clippers in the Pacific Division, the SuperSonics won the tiebreaker and finished fourth.)	31	51	.378	31			Lenny Wilkens
1985–86	1985–86	Western	11th	Pacific	5th	31	51	.378	31			Bernie Bickerstaff
1986–87	1986–87	Western	7th	Pacific	4th	39	43	.476	26	Won First round (Mavericks) 3–1; Won Conference semifinals (Rockets) 4–2; Lost Conference finals (Lakers) 4–0	Dale Ellis (MIP); Tom Chambers (ASG MVP)	Bernie Bickerstaff
1987–88	1987–88	Western	7th	Pacific	3rd	44	38	.537	18	Lost First round (Nuggets) 3–2		Bernie Bickerstaff
1988–89	1988–89	Western	4th	Pacific	3rd	47	35	.573	10	Won First round (Rockets) 3–1; Lost Conference semifinals (Lakers) 4–0		Bernie Bickerstaff
1989–90	1989–90	Western	9th	Pacific	4th	41	41	.500	22			Bernie Bickerstaff
1990–91	1990–91	Western	8th	Pacific	5th	41	41	.500	22	Lost First round (Trail Blazers) 3–2		K. C. Jones
1991–92	1991–92	Western	6th	Pacific	4th	47	35	.573	10	Won First round (Warriors) 3–1; Lost Conference semifinals (Jazz) 4–1		K. C. Jones; Bob Kloppenburg; George Karl
1992–93	1992–93	Western	3rd	Pacific	2nd	55	27	.671	7	Won First round (Jazz) 3–2; Won Conference semifinals (Rockets) 4–3; Lost Conference finals (Suns) 4–3		George Karl
1993–94	1993–94	Western	1st	Pacific	1st	63	19	.768	—	Lost First round (Nuggets) 3–2	Bob Whitsitt (EOY)	George Karl
1994–95	1994–95	Western	4th	Pacific	2nd	57	25	.695	2	Lost First round (Lakers) 3–1		George Karl
1995–96	1995–96	Western	1st	Pacific	1st	64	18	.780	—	Won First round (Kings) 3–1; Won Conference semifinals (Rockets) 4–0; Won Conference finals (Jazz) 4–3; Lost NBA Finals (Bulls) 4–2	Gary Payton (DPOY)	George Karl
1996–97	1996–97	Western	2nd	Pacific	1st	57	25	.695	—	Won First round (Suns) 3–2; Lost Conference semifinals (Rockets) 4–3		George Karl
1997–98	1997–98	Western	2nd	Pacific	1st (Note: Though the SuperSonics had the same record as the Los Angeles Lakers in the Pacific Division, the SuperSonics won the tiebreaker and finished first.)	61	21	.744	—	Won First round (Timberwolves) 3–2; Lost Conference semifinals (Lakers) 4–1		George Karl
1998–99 (Note: Due to a lockout, the season did not start until February 5, 1999, and all 29 teams played a shortened 50 game regular season schedule.)	1998–99	Western	9th	Pacific	5th	25	25	.500	10		Hersey Hawkins (SPOR)	Paul Westphal
1999–00	1999–2000	Western	7th	Pacific	4th	45	37	.549	22	Lost First round (Jazz) 3–2		Paul Westphal
2000–01	2000–01	Western	10th	Pacific	5th	44	38	.537	12			Paul Westphal; Nate McMillan
2001–02	2001–02	Western	7th	Pacific	4th	45	37	.549	16	Lost First round (Spurs) 3–2		Nate McMillan
2002–03	2002–03	Western	10th	Pacific	5th	40	42	.488	19		Ray Allen (SPOR)	Nate McMillan
2003–04	2003–04	Western	12th	Pacific	5th (Note: Though the SuperSonics had the same record as the Golden State Warriors in the Pacific Division, the SuperSonics lost the tiebreaker and finished fifth.)	37	45	.451	19			Nate McMillan
2004–05	2004–05	Western	3rd	Northwest	1st	52	30	.634	—	Won First round (Kings) 4–1; Lost Conference semifinals (Spurs) 4–2		Nate McMillan
2005–06	2005–06	Western	11th	Northwest	3rd	35	47	.427	9			Bob Weiss; Bob Hill
2006–07	2006–07	Western	14th	Northwest	5th	31	51	.378	20			Bob Hill
2007–08	2007–08	Western	15th	Northwest	5th	20	62	.244	35		Kevin Durant (ROY)	P. J. Carlesimo
Oklahoma City Thunder
2008–09	2008–09 (Note: The team relocated to Oklahoma City, Oklahoma, and became the Oklahoma City Thunder prior to the season.)	Western	13th	Northwest	5th	23	59	.280	31			P. J. Carlesimo; Scott Brooks
2009–10	2009–10	Western	8th	Northwest	4th (Note: Though the Thunder had the same record as the Portland Trail Blazers in the Pacific Division, the Thunder lost the tiebreaker and finished fourth.)	50	32	.610	3	Lost First round (Lakers) 4–2	Scott Brooks (COY)	Scott Brooks
2010–11	2010–11	Western	4th	Northwest	1st	55	27	.671	—	Won First round (Nuggets) 4–1; Won Conference semifinals (Grizzlies) 4–3; Lost Conference finals (Mavericks) 4–1		Scott Brooks
2011–12 (Note: Due to a lockout, the season did not start until December 25, 2011 and all 30 teams played a shortened 66 game regular season schedule.)	2011–12	Western	2nd	Northwest	1st	47	19	.712	—	Won First round (Mavericks) 4–0; Won Conference semifinals (Lakers) 4–1; Won Conference finals (Spurs) 4–2; Lost NBA Finals (Heat) 4–1	James Harden (SIX); Kevin Durant (ASG MVP)	Scott Brooks
2012–13	2012–13	Western	1st	Northwest	1st	60	22	.732	—	Won First round (Rockets) 4–2; Lost Conference semifinals (Grizzlies) 4–1		Scott Brooks
2013–14	2013–14	Western	2nd	Northwest	1st	59	23	.720	—	Won First round (Grizzlies) 4–3; Won Conference semifinals (Clippers) 4–2; Lost Conference finals (Spurs) 4–2	Kevin Durant (MVP)	Scott Brooks
2014–15	2014–15	Western	9th	Northwest	2nd	45	37	.549	6		Russell Westbrook (ASG MVP)	Scott Brooks
2015–16	2015–16	Western	3rd	Northwest	1st	55	27	.671	—	Won First round (Mavericks) 4–1; Won Conference semifinals (Spurs) 4–2; Lost Conference finals (Warriors) 4–3	Russell Westbrook (ASG MVP)	Billy Donovan
2016–17	2016–17	Western	6th	Northwest	2nd	47	35	.573	4	Lost First round (Rockets) 4–1	Russell Westbrook (MVP)	Billy Donovan
2017–18	2017–18	Western	4th	Northwest	2nd	48	34	.585	1	Lost First round (Jazz) 4–2		Billy Donovan
2018–19	2018–19	Western	6th	Northwest	4th	49	33	.598	5	Lost First round (Trail Blazers) 4–1		Billy Donovan
2019–20 (Note: Due to the COVID-19 pandemic, the season was suspended from March 11 to July 30, 2020, and the regular season was shortened to 72 games for the Thunder.)	2019–20	Western	5th	Northwest	2nd	44	28	.611	1.5	Lost First round (Rockets) 4–3		Billy Donovan
2020–21 (Note: Due to the COVID-19 pandemic, the season did not start until December 22, 2020, and all 30 teams played a shortened regular season schedule of 72 games.)	2020–21	Western	14th	Northwest	5th	22	50	.306	30			Mark Daigneault
2021–22	2021–22	Western	14th	Northwest	5th	24	58	.293	25			Mark Daigneault
2022–23	2022–23	Western	10th	Northwest	3rd	40	42	.488	13			Mark Daigneault
2023–24	2023–24	Western	1st	Northwest	1st	57	25	.695	—	Won First round (Pelicans) 4–0; Lost Conference semifinals (Mavericks) 4–2	Mark Daigneault (COY)	Mark Daigneault
2024–25	2024–25	Western	1st	Northwest	1st	68	14	.829	—	Won First round (Grizzlies) 4–0; Won Conference semifinals (Nuggets) 4–3; Won Conference finals (Timberwolves) 4–1; Won NBA Finals (Pacers) 4–3	Shai Gilgeous-Alexander (MVP, FMVP); Sam Presti (EOY)	Mark Daigneault
2025–26	2025–26	Western	1st	Northwest	1st	64	18	.780	—	Won First round (Suns) 4–0; Won Conference semifinals (Lakers) 4–0; Lost Conference finals (Spurs) 4–3	Shai Gilgeous-Alexander (MVP)	Mark Daigneault

== All-time records ==
Note: Statistics are correct as of the conclusion of the 2025–26 NBA season.

Statistic	Wins	Losses	Win%
Seattle SuperSonics regular season record (1967–2008)	1,745	1,585	.524
Oklahoma City Thunder regular season record (2008–present)	857	583	.595
All-time regular season record	2,602	2,168	.545
Seattle SuperSonics post-season record (1967–2008)	107	110	.493
Oklahoma City Thunder post-season record (2008–present)	90	72	.556
All-time post-season record	197	182	.520
All-time regular and post-season record	2,799	2,350	.544
