= 1975–76 Seattle SuperSonics season =

NBA professional basketball team season

- Head coach: Bill Russell
- General manager: Bill Russell
- Owners: Sam Schulman
- Arena: Seattle Center Coliseum

Results
- Record: 43–39 (.524)
- Place: Division: 2nd (Pacific); Conference: 3rd (Western)
- Playoff finish: West Semifinals (lost to Suns 2–4)
- Stats at Basketball Reference

Local media
- Television: KTNT-TV
- Radio: KOMO

The 1975–76 Seattle SuperSonics season was the 9th season of the Seattle SuperSonics in the National Basketball Association (NBA). The SuperSonics finished the season in second place in the Western Conference with a 43–39 record, the same as the previous year and reached the playoffs for a second consecutive season, where they lost to the Phoenix Suns in the conference semifinals in six games.

== Offseason ==
=== Draft ===
Round	Pick	Player	Position	Nationality	College
1	12	Frank Oleynick	G	United States	Seattle
2	21	Bruce Seals	F	United States	Xavier (LA)
4	66	Jim Moore	F	United States	Utah State
5	84	Dwain Govan	G	United States	Bishop
6	102	Larry Smith	F	United States	North Carolina A&T
7	120	Hollis Miller	F	United States	Drury
8	138	Ken McKenzie	C	Canada	Montana
9	155	Rich Haws	F	United States	Utah State
10	170	Jerry Bellotti	F	United States	Santa Clara

== Roster ==
1975–76 Seattle SuperSonics roster
Players

Pos.	No.	Player	Height	Weight	DOB	From
F/C	35	Zaid Abdul-Aziz	6 ft 9 in (2.06 m)	235 lb (107 kg)	1946–04–07	Iowa State
F/C	40	Mike Bantom	6 ft 9 in (2.06 m)	200 lb (91 kg)	1951–12–03	Saint Joseph's
G	32	Fred Brown	6 ft 3 in (1.91 m)	182 lb (83 kg)	1948–08–07	Iowa
C	16	Tommy Burleson	7 ft 2 in (2.18 m)	225 lb (102 kg)	1952–02–24	NC State
G	25	Rod Derline	6 ft 0 in (1.83 m)	175 lb (79 kg)	1952–03–11	Seattle
G/F	3	Herm Gilliam	6 ft 3 in (1.91 m)	190 lb (86 kg)	1946–05–05	Purdue
F	11	Leonard Gray	6 ft 8 in (2.03 m)	240 lb (109 kg)	1951–12–19	Long Beach State
F/C	42	John Hummer	6 ft 9 in (2.06 m)	230 lb (104 kg)	1948–05–04	Princeton
F	15	Willie Norwood	6 ft 7 in (2.01 m)	220 lb (100 kg)	1947–08–08	Alcorn State
G	44	Frank Oleynick	6 ft 2 in (1.88 m)	185 lb (84 kg)	1955–02–20	Seattle
F	45	Bruce Seals	6 ft 8 in (2.03 m)	210 lb (95 kg)	1953–06–18	Xavier (LA)
G/F	22	Talvin Skinner	6 ft 5 in (1.96 m)	195 lb (88 kg)	1952–09–10	Maryland Eastern Shore
G	13	Donald Watts	6 ft 1 in (1.85 m)	175 lb (79 kg)	1951–07–22	Xavier (LA)

Coaches
Head coach
- Bill Russell
Assistant(s)
- Bob Hopkins

Legend
- (DP) Unsigned draft pick
- (FA) Free agent
- (S) Suspended
- Injured

Roster

== Standings ==
Pacific Division	W	L	PCT	GB	Home	Road	Div
y-Golden State Warriors	59	23	.720	–	36–5	23–18	17–9
x-Seattle SuperSonics	43	39	.524	16	31–10	12–29	12–14
x-Phoenix Suns	42	40	.512	17	27–14	15–26	15–11
Los Angeles Lakers	40	42	.488	19	31–11	9–31	10–16
Portland Trail Blazers	37	45	.451	22	25–15	12–30	11–15

#	Western Conference				
#	Team	W	L	PCT	GB
1	z-Golden State Warriors	59	23	.720	–
2	x-Seattle SuperSonics	43	39	.524	16
3	x-Phoenix Suns	42	40	.512	17
4	y-Milwaukee Bucks	38	44	.463	21
5	x-Detroit Pistons	36	46	.439	23
6	Los Angeles Lakers	40	42	.488	19
7	Portland Trail Blazers	37	45	.451	22
8	Kansas City Kings	31	51	.378	28
9	Chicago Bulls	24	58	.293	35

- z – clinched division title
- y – clinched division title
- x – clinched playoff spot

== Game log ==
=== Regular season ===
1975–76 game log
Total: 43–39 (home: 31–10; road: 12–29)
October: 3–2 (home: 2–0; road: 1–2)

Game	Date	Team	Score	High points	High rebounds	High assists	Location Attendance	Record
1	October 24	Portland	W 105–97	Fred Brown (29)			Seattle Center Coliseum; 13,601	1–0
2	October 26	Phoenix	W 113–99	Leonard Gray (27)			Seattle Center Coliseum; 13,288	2–0
3	October 28	@ Chicago	L 90–101	Slick Watts (28)			Chicago Stadium; 5,115	2–1
4	October 29	@ Kansas City	W 92–91	Bruce Seals (25)			Kemper Arena; 9,464	3–1
5	October 31	@ Los Angeles	L 104–120	Fred Brown (33)			The Forum; 12,118	3–2

November : 7–8 (home: 4–2; road: 3–6)

Game	Date	Team	Score	High points	High rebounds	High assists	Location Attendance	Record
6	November 2	Washington	L 85–94	Tommy Burleson (20)			Seattle Center Coliseum; 14,096	3–3
7	November 5	@ Detroit	L 107–124	Slick Watts (25)			Cobo Arena; 4,777	3–4
8	November 6	@ Washington	L 100–110	Fred Brown (29)			Capital Centre; 7,732	3–5
9	November 8	@ Atlanta	L 94–107	Fred Brown (24)			Omni Coliseum; 4,382	3–6
10	November 9	@ New Orleans	W 111–97	Fred Brown (41)			Louisiana Superdome; 13,472	4–6
11	November 12	Kansas City	L 92–107	Fred Brown (19)			Seattle Center Coliseum; 11,213	4–7
12	November 13	@ Phoenix	L 103–106	Bruce Seals (24)			Arizona Veterans Memorial Coliseum; 5,016	4–8
13	November 14	Cleveland	W 100–97 (OT)	Fred Brown (26)			Seattle Center Coliseum; 11,969	5–8
14	November 16	Golden State	W 102–98	Fred Brown (30)			Seattle Center Coliseum; 14,096	6–8
15	November 19	Chicago	W 97–87	Fred Brown (25)			Seattle Center Coliseum; 13,114	7–8
16	November 23	Milwaukee	W 112–104	Tommy Burleson (28)			Seattle Center Coliseum; 14,021	8–8
17	November 25	@ New York	W 128–127 (OT)	Tommy Burleson (35)			Madison Square Garden; 15,548	9–8
18	November 26	@ Boston	W 110–109	Fred Brown (30)			Boston Garden; 12,189	10–8
19	November 28	@ Philadelphia	L 94–113	Tommy Burleson (18)			The Spectrum; 13,674	10–9
20	November 29	@ Cleveland	L 108–124	Fred Brown (30)			Coliseum at Richfield; 10,151	10–10

December : 8–7 (home: 6–4; road: 2–3)

Game	Date	Team	Score	High points	High rebounds	High assists	Location Attendance	Record
21	December 2	@ Kansas City	W 101–90	Fred Brown (31)			Kemper Arena; 7,670	11–10
22	December 3	@ Houston	L 101–107	Bruce Seals (16)			The Summit; 5,374	11–11
23	December 6	@ Golden State	L 94–104	Fred Brown (17)			Oakland–Alameda County Coliseum Arena; 12,677	11–12
24	December 7	Golden State	L 106–115	Fred Brown, Slick Watts (22)			Seattle Center Coliseum; 14,096	11–13
25	December 10	Chicago	W 99–79	Fred Brown (17)			Seattle Center Coliseum; 12,471	12–13
26	December 12	Detroit	W 97–95	Fred Brown (27)			Seattle Center Coliseum; 12,859	13–13
27	December 14	Philadelphia	W 114–105	Fred Brown (31)			Seattle Center Coliseum; 14,096	14–13
28	December 17	Cleveland	L 101–115	Rod Derline (16)			Seattle Center Coliseum; 12,291	14–14
29	December 19	New Orleans	W 113–102	Herm Gilliam (24)			Seattle Center Coliseum; 11,427	15–14
30	December 21	Milwaukee	L 101–103	Mike Bantom (20)			Seattle Center Coliseum; 12,188	15–15
31	December 23	@ Portland	L 100–125	Tommy Burleson (23)			Memorial Coliseum; 8,610	15–16
32	December 26	Kansas City	W 90–87	Bruce Seals (21)			Seattle Center Coliseum; 13,673	16–16
33	December 27	Los Angeles	L 100–109	Tommy Burleson (25)			Seattle Center Coliseum; 14,096	16–17
34	December 28	Houston	W 116–106	Fred Brown (23)			Seattle Center Coliseum; 13,702	17–17
35	December 30	@ Los Angeles	W 112–100	Fred Brown (34)			The Forum; 12,740	18–17

January : 5–9 (home: 3–2; road: 2–7)

Game	Date	Team	Score	High points	High rebounds	High assists	Location Attendance	Record
36	January 2	Boston	L 98–102	Fred Brown (34)			Seattle Center Coliseum; 14,096	18–18
37	January 4	Golden State	W 97–85	Fred Brown (20)			Seattle Center Coliseum; 13,669	19–18
38	January 7	New York	W 91–89	Fred Brown (24)			Seattle Center Coliseum; 14,096	20–18
39	January 9	@ Phoenix	W 112–110 (OT)	Tommy Burleson (25)			Arizona Veterans Memorial Coliseum; 5,774	21–18
40	January 11	Buffalo	L 104–125	Leonard Gray (20)			Seattle Center Coliseum; 14,096	21–19
41	January 13	@ Milwaukee	L 108–114	Fred Brown (24)			MECCA Arena; 10,496	21–20
42	January 14	@ Atlanta	W 112–110	Fred Brown (33)			Omni Coliseum; 4,376	22–20
43	January 16	@ Washington	L 85–100	Slick Watts (19)			Capital Centre; 9,425	22–21
44	January 17	@ Buffalo	L 101–110	Fred Brown (28)			Buffalo Memorial Auditorium; 8,469	22–22
45	January 21	@ Detroit	L 104–111	Fred Brown (26)			Cobo Arena; 3,612	22–23
46	January 22	@ Cleveland	L 99–109	Fred Brown (17)			Coliseum at Richfield; 5,102	22–24
47	January 24	@ Houston	L 103–110	Fred Brown (37)			The Summit; 5,027	22–25
48	January 28	@ Portland	L 104–124	Fred Brown (26)			Memorial Coliseum; 10,930	22–26
49	January 30	Washington	W 123–100	Fred Brown (29)			Seattle Center Coliseum; 14,096	23–26

February : 8–5 (home: 6–2; road: 2–3)

Game	Date	Team	Score	High points	High rebounds	High assists	Location Attendance	Record
50	February 6	Portland	L 100–109	Leonard Gray (32)			Seattle Center Coliseum; 13,419	23–27
51	February 7	@ Golden State	L 100–127	Tommy Burleson (26)			Oakland–Alameda County Coliseum Arena; 12,787	23–28
52	February 8	Phoenix	L 101–107 (OT)	Tommy Burleson (33)			Seattle Center Coliseum; 13,039	23–29
53	February 11	New Orleans	W 93–90	Tommy Burleson (25)			Seattle Center Coliseum; 13,595	24–29
54	February 13	Atlanta	W 119–102	Tommy Burleson, Herm Gilliam (20)			Seattle Center Coliseum; 13,925	25–29
55	February 14	@ Portland	W 122–108	Bruce Seals (29)			Memorial Coliseum; 11,347	26–29
56	February 15	Detroit	W 109–107	Herm Gilliam (22)			Seattle Center Coliseum; 13,728	27–29
57	February 18	Boston	W 124–99	Fred Brown (29)			Seattle Center Coliseum; 14,096	28–29
58	February 20	Philadelphia	W 111–92	Fred Brown (26)			Seattle Center Coliseum; 14,096	29–29
59	February 22	Los Angeles	W 97–91	Fred Brown (27)			Seattle Center Coliseum; 14,096	30–29
60	February 25	@ Buffalo	W 126–94	Fred Brown (31)			Buffalo Memorial Auditorium; 8,691	31–29
61	February 27	@ Boston	L 118–122	Fred Brown (33)			Boston Garden; 15,320	31–30
62	February 29	@ Philadelphia	L 115–130	Fred Brown (23)			The Spectrum; 11,649	31–31

March : 8–5 (home: 6–0; road: 2–5)

Game	Date	Team	Score	High points	High rebounds	High assists	Location Attendance	Record
63	March 2	@ New York	W 109–105	Bruce Seals (29)			Madison Square Garden; 14,227	32–31
64	March 3	@ Detroit	L 110–114	Fred Brown (24)			Cobo Arena; 3,096	32–32
65	March 5	@ Kansas City	L 93–111	Fred Brown (17)			Kemper Arena; 5,852	32–33
66	March 7	@ New Orleans	L 106–124	Leonard Gray (16)			Louisiana Superdome; 8,008	32–34
67	March 9	@ Chicago	L 101–102	Fred Brown (26)			Chicago Stadium; 4,614	32–35
68	March 10	@ Milwaukee	W 110–105	Fred Brown (26)			MECCA Arena; 9,587	33–35
69	March 14	New York	W 113–103	Fred Brown (20)			Seattle Center Coliseum; 14,096	34–35
70	March 17	Buffalo	W 122–111	Fred Brown (37)			Seattle Center Coliseum; 14,096	35–35
71	March 21	Houston	W 117–107	Fred Brown, Tommy Burleson (24)			Seattle Center Coliseum; 14,096	36–35
72	March 23	@ Phoenix	L 97–104	Fred Brown (32)			Arizona Veterans Memorial Coliseum; 7,589	36–36
73	March 24	Milwaukee	W 135–110	Bruce Seals (27)			Seattle Center Coliseum; 14,096	37–36
74	March 28	Atlanta	W 127–112	Fred Brown (27)			Seattle Center Coliseum; 14,096	38–36
75	March 31	Los Angeles	W 120–109	Fred Brown, Herm Gilliam (22)			Seattle Center Coliseum; 14,096	39–36

April : 4–3 (home: 4–0; road: 0–3)

Game	Date	Team	Score	High points	High rebounds	High assists	Location Attendance	Record
76	April 2	@ Los Angeles	L 105–113	Tommy Burleson (32)			The Forum; 10,784	39–37
77	April 3	@ Golden State	L 115–130	Willie Norwood (20)			Oakland–Alameda County Coliseum Arena; 12,787	39–38
78	April 4	Phoenix	W 117–89	Fred Brown (33)			Seattle Center Coliseum; 14,096	40–38
79	April 7	Chicago	W 115–114	Willie Norwood (24)			Seattle Center Coliseum; 14,096	41–38
80	April 9	Golden State	W 119–103	Fred Brown (26)			Seattle Center Coliseum; 14,096	42–38
81	April 10	@ Phoenix	L 95–121	Herm Gilliam (22)			Arizona Veterans Memorial Coliseum; 9,577	42–39
82	April 11	Portland	W 132–131	Fred Brown (33)			Seattle Center Coliseum; 14,096	43–39

1975–76 season schedule

=== Playoffs ===
1976 playoff game log
Conference semifinals: 2–4 (home: 2–1; road: 0–3)

Game	Date	Team	Score	High points	High rebounds	High assists	Location Attendance	Series
1	April 13	Phoenix	W 102–99	Fred Brown (34)	Fred Brown (7)	Slick Watts (8)	Seattle Center Coliseum; 12,408	1–0
2	April 15	Phoenix	L 111–116	Fred Brown (45)	Tommy Burleson (12)	Slick Watts (6)	Seattle Center Coliseum; 14,096	1–1
3	April 18	@ Phoenix	L 91–103	Slick Watts (18)	three players tied (8)	Slick Watts (7)	Arizona Veterans Memorial Coliseum; 13,036	1–2
4	April 20	@ Phoenix	L 114–130	Fred Brown (33)	Tommy Burleson (20)	Herm Gilliam (7)	Arizona Veterans Memorial Coliseum; 13,036	1–3
5	April 25	Phoenix	W 114–108	Bruce Seals (28)	Willie Norwood (13)	Slick Watts (12)	Seattle Center Coliseum; 14,096	2–3
6	April 24	@ Phoenix	L 112–123	Seals, Watts (24)	Bruce Seals (7)	Slick Watts (11)	Arizona Veterans Memorial Coliseum; 13,192	2–4

1976 schedule

== Player statistics ==
Legend
GP	Games played	GS	Games started	MPG	Minutes per game
FG%	Field-goal percentage	3P%	3-point field-goal percentage	FT%	Free-throw percentage
RPG	Rebounds per game	APG	Assists per game	SPG	Steals per game
BPG	Blocks per game	PPG	Points per game

=== Regular season ===
Player	GP	GS	MPG	FG%	3FG%	FT%	RPG	APG	SPG	BPG	PPG
Zaid Abdul-Aziz	27		8.3	.467		.552	2.8	.6	.3	.6	3.2
Mike Bantom	66		22.8	.471		.675	5.6	1.5	.4	.4	8.4
Fred Brown	76		33.1	.488		.869	4.2	2.7	1.9	.2	23.1
Tommy Burleson	82		32.3	.481		.750	9.0	2.2	.9	1.8	15.6
Al Carlson	28		10.0	.342		.621	2.6	.5	.3	.4	2.6
Rod Derline	49		6.9	.403		.804	.6	.5	.2	.0	3.9
Herm Gilliam	81		20.3	.442		.776	2.7	2.5	1.0	.1	8.5
Leonard Gray	66		32.4	.474		.746	6.0	3.1	1.1	.5	13.8
John Hummer	29		12.6	.478		.415	2.7	.9	.2	.3	2.8
Willie Norwood	64		15.7	.485		.749	3.6	.9	.7	.1	6.9
Frank Oleynick	52		12.5	.402		.688	.9	1.0	.4	.1	5.9
Bruce Seals	81		30.1	.436		.678	6.3	1.5	.8	.5	11.8
Gene Short	7		5.3	.545		.500	1.0	.3	.0	.0	1.9
Talvin Skinner	72		17.0	.463		.613	3.7	.9	.7	.1	4.3
Slick Watts	82		33.9	.427		.578	4.5	8.1	3.2	.2	13.0

=== Playoffs ===
Player	GP	GS	MPG	FG%	3FG%	FT%	RPG	APG	SPG	BPG	PPG
Zaid Abdul-Aziz	5		12.0	.700		.727	4.2	.4	.0	1.0	7.2
Mike Bantom	6		19.0	.579		.700	3.8	1.3	.7	.3	9.7
Fred Brown	6		39.3	.511		.795	4.7	2.8	2.2	.0	28.5
Tommy Burleson	6		34.7	.600		.761	9.5	1.7	1.0	1.3	20.8
Rod Derline	4		10.3	.200		1.000	1.0	.3	.3	.0	1.5
Herm Gilliam	6		14.3	.222		.625	1.8	2.0	1.0	.0	2.8
John Hummer	3		5.3	.667			.3	.0	.0	.0	1.3
Willie Norwood	6		35.8	.414		.611	6.3	1.3	1.2	.2	9.8
Bruce Seals	6		30.2	.441		.692	6.0	.5	.8	1.0	13.0
Talvin Skinner	6		14.3	.286		.733	2.5	1.2	.8	.3	3.2
Slick Watts	6		32.8	.435		.478	3.0	8.2	2.0	.3	11.8

== Awards and records ==
- Slick Watts led the league in totals in assists and steals, as well as assists per game and was selected to the NBA All-Defensive First Team. He was also presented with the J. Walter Kennedy Citizenship Award.
- Fred Brown made his first All-Star appearance at the 1976 NBA All-Star Game.

== Transactions ==
=== Overview ===
Players Added	Players Lost
Via draft: Frank Oleynick; Bruce Seals; Via trade: Mike Bantom; Herm Gilliam; Gene Short (later waived); Via free agency: Zaid Abdul-Aziz; Al Carlson (later waived); Rod Derline; Willie Norwood	Via trade: Archie Clark; Jim Fox; Spencer Haywood; Waived: Wardell Jackson; Dean Tolson

=== Trades ===
September 24, 1975	To Seattle SuperSonics	To Detroit Pistons
September 24, 1975	1978 first round pick	Archie Clark
October 22, 1975	To Seattle SuperSonics	To Milwaukee Bucks
October 22, 1975	1976 second round pick	Jim Fox
October 22, 1975	To Seattle SuperSonics	To Atlanta Hawks
October 22, 1975	Herm Gilliam	1976 third round pick
October 24, 1975	To Seattle SuperSonics	To New York Knicks
October 24, 1975	1979 first round pick	Spencer Haywood
November 22, 1975	To Seattle SuperSonics	To Phoenix Suns
November 22, 1975	Mike Bantom	Cash considerations
