= Al Carlson =

Al Carlson may refer to:

- Al Carlson (basketball) (born 1951), American basketball player
- Al Carlson (politician) (born 1948), American politician
