= Herm Gilliam =

American basketball player

Personal information
- Born: April 5, 1946 Winston-Salem, North Carolina, U.S.
- Died: April 16, 2005 (aged 58) Salem, Oregon, U.S.
- Listed height: 6 ft 3 in (1.91 m)
- Listed weight: 190 lb (86 kg)

Career information
- High school: Atkins (Winston-Salem, North Carolina)
- College: Purdue (1966–1969)
- NBA draft: 1969: 1st round, 8th overall pick
- Drafted by: Cincinnati Royals
- Playing career: 1969–1977
- Position: Shooting guard / point guard
- Number: 30, 9, 3

Career history
- 1969–1970: Cincinnati Royals
- 1970–1971: Buffalo Braves
- 1971–1975: Atlanta Hawks
- 1975–1976: Seattle SuperSonics
- 1976–1977: Portland Trail Blazers

Career highlights
- NBA champion (1977)

Career statistics
- Points: 6,252 (10.8 ppg)
- Rebounds: 2,175 (3.8 rpg)
- Assists: 2,225 (3.8 apg)
- Stats at NBA.com
- Stats at Basketball Reference

Herman L. Gilliam Jr. (April 5, 1946 – April 16, 2005) was an American professional basketball player. After playing college basketball for the Purdue Boilermakers, he played in the National Basketball Association (NBA) from 1969 to 1977, winning a championship with the Portland Trail Blazers in his final season.

== College career ==
Herm Gilliam attended Purdue University, located in West Lafayette, Indiana. He played under head coach George King and alongside Billy Keller and three-time All-American Rick Mount. He was an honored co-captain of the Boilermakers in both his junior and senior years and helped lead the Boilers to an NCAA Finals appearance in 1969. He led Purdue with 8.5 rebounds per game his senior season and received First Team All-Big Ten honors. He twice received Purdue's Most Valuable Player award and was the recipient of the Ward Lambert Scholarship Trophy for scholastic excellence. In three varsity seasons at Purdue, the 6'3" and 190 lb guard scored 1,118 points and finished his collegiate career in 5th place among the school's all-time scoring leaders, averaging 16 points a game. After his junior season, Herm declined to leave before his senior year for a chance to play for the Chicago Bulls, whom he was drafted by in the 13th round of the 1968 NBA draft. In 2006, he was inducted in the Purdue Athletic Hall of Fame.

== Professional career ==
=== Cincinnati Royals, Buffalo Braves ===
Gilliam was selected by the Kentucky Colonels in the 1969 ABA draft and by the Cincinnati Royals in the first round (8th pick) of the 1969 NBA draft. He averaged 7.5 points a game in his rookie season while playing in Cincinnati. He missed the last few weeks of the season due to him serving six months of military duty. After his first season, Gilliam was selected by the Buffalo Braves, an expansion team, in the 1970 NBA Expansion Draft. He spent the 1970–71 season with Buffalo, averaging 11.2 points and just over 4 rebounds a game.

=== Atlanta Hawks ===
During his honeymoon, "Bitty", as he was known to teammates, was traded to the Atlanta Hawks on July 23, 1971, to start the 1971–72 season. Working with the likes of Lou Hudson and Pete Maravich in the backcourt, he averaged 10.2 points a game and had career high 83.8 free-throw percentage, connecting with 145 on the season. He scored his season high of 30 points vs. the Cleveland Cavaliers on March 19, 1972. Herm's best career season came during the 1972–73 campaign, where he averaged 14 points and 5.25 rebounds a game with a .468 field goal percentage, while leading the Hawks in steals. In his only season in which he scored over 1,000 points (1,665), he scored a career high 35 points against the Portland Trail Blazers on October 26, 1973. During his four seasons with Atlanta, he averaged 12.5 points a game, including his career high of 14.1 during the 1973–74 season.

=== Seattle SuperSonics, Portland Trail Blazers ===
On October 22, 1975, Gilliam was traded to the Seattle SuperSonics. Gilliam suffered from a knee injury during the 1975–76 season, but rallied back and scored his season high 24 points in a game. After an injury-prone season with the SuperSonics, Gilliam was traded to the Portland Trail Blazers, where he won an NBA championship ring with the likes of Bill Walton during his final season in 1977. Early in the season Gilliam was unhappy with his playing time. However, he refused a trade to New Orleans, a team which promised him more playing time, to stay in Portland, as he felt the Trail Blazers gave him a greater chance at winning a championship. Gilliam's best game of the season came in game two of the Western Conference Finals against the Los Angeles Lakers, where he scored 24 points on 12 of 18 shooting from the field. David Halberstam described his contributions in this game in his book The Breaks of the Game.

As the season progressed his (Gilliam's) playing time increased. In the crucial playoff series against Los Angeles, a team which had beaten Portland all four regular season games [sic: the Trail Blazers actually won the final meeting 145–116, a home game which was their, but not the Lakers', final game of the regular season], he played one memorable game. Thereafter his teammates referred to it simply as Herm's Game. Los Angeles was playing at home and playing a strong game, and it led 77–70 going into the fourth quarter. Herm Gilliam started the fourth quarter for Portland and played brilliantly, scoring, stealing the ball, scoring again, hitting difficult off-balance shots, making one particular shot, a falling away jump shot off the wrong foot, with Ramsay, it was said, on the bench shouting as he took the shot, "No, no, no....Yes!" Portland, largely through his efforts had gone on to win...

== Retirement ==
After retiring from the NBA, he took a job with United Parcel Service where he worked for 15 years, eventually being promoted to managing the company's Corvallis–Albany hub.

Gilliam died of a heart attack on April 16, 2005, in Salem, Oregon.

== Career statistics ==
Legend
GP	Games played	GS	Games started	MPG	Minutes per game
FG%	Field goal percentage	3P%	3-point field goal percentage	FT%	Free throw percentage
RPG	Rebounds per game	APG	Assists per game	SPG	Steals per game
BPG	Blocks per game	PPG	Points per game	**Bold**	Career high

=== NBA ===
==== Regular season ====
Year	Team	GP	MPG	FG%	FT%	RPG	APG	SPG	BPG	PPG
1969–70	Cincinnati	57	20.4	.406	.747	3.8	3.1			7.5
1970–71	Buffalo	80	26.0	.422	.751	4.2	3.6			11.2
1971–72	Atlanta	**82**	28.5	.446	**.838**	4.1	4.6			10.2
1972–73	Atlanta	76	**36.1**	**.468**	.820	**5.3**	**6.3**			14.0
1973–74	Atlanta	62	32.3	.454	.791	**4.3**	5.7	**2.2**	**.3**	**14.1**
1974–75	Atlanta	60	23.2	.427	.832	3.4	2.8	1.3	.2	12.0
1975–76	Seattle	81	20.3	.442	.776	2.7	2.5	1.0	.1	8.5
1976–77†	Portland	80	20.8	.438	.767	2.5	2.1	1.0	.1	9.3
Career		578	26.0	.441	.792	3.8	3.8	1.3	.2	10.8

==== Playoffs ====
Year	Team	GP	MPG	FG%	FT%	RPG	APG	SPG	BPG	PPG
1972	Atlanta	6	28.8	.394	.909	5.0	**5.5**			11.0
1973	Atlanta	6	**32.8**	.407	**1.000**	**5.3**	5.2			**11.8**
1975	Seattle	6	14.3	.222	.625	1.8	2.0	**1.0**	.0	2.8
1977†	Portland	**18**	16.4	**.431**	.750	1.1	1.8	.7	**.1**	6.4
Career		36	20.9	.397	.806	2.6	3.0	.8	.0	7.5
