= Willie Norwood (basketball) =

American basketball player

Personal information
- Born: August 8, 1947 (age 79) Carrollton, Mississippi, U.S.
- Listed height: 6 ft 7 in (2.01 m)
- Listed weight: 220 lb (100 kg)

Career information
- High school: Marshall (Carrollton, Mississippi)
- College: Alcorn State (1965–1969)
- NBA draft: 1969: 2nd round, 19th overall pick
- Drafted by: Detroit Pistons
- Playing career: 1970–1978
- Position: Power forward
- Number: 8, 15, 24

Career history
- 1970–1971: Caen Basket Calvados
- 1971–1975: Detroit Pistons
- 1975–1977: Seattle SuperSonics
- 1977: Detroit Pistons
- 1978: Rochester Zeniths
- 1978: Portland Trail Blazers

Career NBA statistics
- Points: 3,209 (7.5 ppg)
- Rebounds: 1,597 (3.7 rpg)
- Assists: 364 (0.8 apg)
- Stats at NBA.com
- Stats at Basketball Reference

Willie B. Norwood (born August 8, 1947) is an American former professional basketball player.

A 6'7" power forward from Carrollton, Mississippi and Alcorn State University, Norwood played in the National Basketball Association (NBA) from 1971 to 1978 as a member of the Detroit Pistons, Seattle SuperSonics, and Portland Trail Blazers. He averaged 7.5 points per game in his NBA career.

== Career statistics ==
Legend
GP	Games played	GS	Games started	MPG	Minutes per game
FG%	Field goal percentage	3P%	3-point field goal percentage	FT%	Free throw percentage
RPG	Rebounds per game	APG	Assists per game	SPG	Steals per game
BPG	Blocks per game	PPG	Points per game	**Bold**	Career high

=== NBA ===
==== Regular season ====
Year	Team	GP	MPG	FG%	FT%	RPG	APG	SPG	BPG	PPG
1971–72	Detroit	78	16.3	.505	.651	**4.1**	.6			7.5
1972–73	Detroit	**79**	16.2	.494	.684	**4.1**	.7			**8.3**
1973–74	Detroit	74	15.9	.510	.664	3.1	.8	.8	.1	8.0
1974–75	Detroit	24	14.5	**.520**	.738	3.7	.7	**1.0**	.0	6.6
1975–76	Seattle	64	15.7	.485	**.749**	3.6	.9	.7	.1	6.9
1976–77	Seattle	76	**21.7**	.469	.733	3.8	**1.3**	.8	.1	7.7
1977–78	Detroit	16	16.3	.415	.690	3.4	.9	.8	**.2**	5.5
1977–78	Portland	19	18.5	.404	.652	3.4	1.0	.9	.0	5.8
Career		430	17.1	.488	.697	3.7	.8	.8	.1	7.5

==== Playoffs ====
Year	Team	GP	MPG	FG%	FT%	RPG	APG	SPG	BPG	PPG
1974	Detroit	5	6.2	**.636**	**1.000**	.6	.2	.2	.2	3.6
1976	Seattle	**6**	**35.8**	.414	.611	**6.3**	**1.3**	**1.2**	.2	**9.8**
1978	Portland	3	14.7	.583	**1.000**	1.3	**1.3**	.0	**.3**	5.0
Career		14	20.7	.469	.696	3.2	.9	.6	.2	6.6
