= Fred Brown (basketball) =

American basketball player (born 1948)

Personal information
- Born: August 7, 1948 (age 78) Milwaukee, Wisconsin, U.S.
- Listed height: 6 ft 3 in (1.91 m)
- Listed weight: 182 lb (83 kg)

Career information
- High school: Lincoln (Milwaukee, Wisconsin)
- College: Southeastern CC (1967–1969); Iowa (1969–1971)
- NBA draft: 1971: 1st round, 6th overall pick
- Drafted by: Seattle SuperSonics
- Playing career: 1971–1984
- Position: Shooting guard / point guard
- Number: 32

Career history
- 1971–1984: Seattle SuperSonics

Career highlights
- NBA champion (1979); NBA All-Star (1976); No. 32 retired by Seattle SuperSonics; Third-team All-American – AP (1971); First-team All-Big Ten (1971)

Career statistics
- Points: 14,018 (14.6 ppg)
- Assists: 3,160 (3.3 apg)
- Steals: 1,149 (1.4 spg)
- Stats at NBA.com
- Stats at Basketball Reference

Fred Brown (born August 7, 1948), nicknamed "Downtown Freddie Brown", is an American former professional basketball player who was a guard in the National Basketball Association (NBA). He played college basketball for the Iowa Hawkeyes, before playing 13 seasons (1971–1984) in the NBA, all with the Seattle SuperSonics. Known for his accurate outside shooting, Brown was selected to the 1976 NBA All-Star Game and scored 14,018 points in his career.

== High school and college ==
Brown graduated from downtown Milwaukee's Lincoln High School in 1967, where other high schools gave him his nickname "Downtown Freddie" Brown. He led Lincoln to two state titles, and made all-state twice. He captained the 1967 team, and earned four prep letters, including one each in football and baseball. Due to his outside shooting skills, his high school nickname "Downtown Freddie" Brown followed him for his entire career.

Brown finished his senior year at the University of Iowa in 1971, averaging 27.6 points per game, and was selected by the Kentucky Colonels in the American Basketball Association draft and selected 6th overall by the Seattle SuperSonics in the 1971 NBA draft.

== NBA ==
Brown's NBA career got off to a slow start, as he averaged only 4.2 points per game in 33 games as a rookie, playing behind veteran guards Lenny Wilkens and Dick Snyder. Following Wilkens' trade to the Cleveland Cavaliers in 1972, Brown saw more playing time and his scoring average rose to 13.5 and 16.5 points per game in the next two seasons.

After Snyder was traded to the Cavaliers in 1974, Brown's output increased again, to 21.0 points per game in the 1974–75 season and he finished fifth in the league in steals per game. In the 1975–76 season, Brown had an All-Star season finishing fifth in the NBA in both scoring average and free throw percentage.

Brown continued as a starter for the Sonics through the 1976–77 season and the start of the 1977–78 season. However, when Lenny Wilkens took over as coach after a slow start, he decided to pair new free-agent signing Gus Williams and second-year guard Dennis Johnson in the Sonics' starting backcourt and bring Brown off the bench. He dubbed Brown "Instant Offense". The Sonics made the NBA Finals that season and the next, winning the NBA championship in 1978–79.

Brown was captain of the SuperSonics' 1978–79 NBA championship team. Often among the league leaders in free-throw percentage, Brown also led the NBA in three-point shooting percentage in 1979–80—the first season in which the three-point line was adopted by the league.

== Legacy ==
When he retired in 1984, Brown was the SuperSonics' all-time leader in:

- Games played (963)
- Points scored (14,018)
- Field goals (6,006)
- Free throws (1,896)

Brown still holds the team's all-time marks for points in a regular season game with 58, points in a playoff game with 45 (a record shared with Ray Allen), and steals in a game with 10 (a record shared with Gus Williams).

Brown's #32 SuperSonics jersey was retired November 6, 1986 in honor of his career with the SuperSonics.

Brown continues to reside in the Seattle area and is one of the former players lobbying to bring NBA basketball back to Seattle after the SuperSonics relocated to Oklahoma City in 2008.

== Popular culture references ==
Brown is one of five 1970s Seattle SuperSonics players whose names are featured on characters in "The Exterminator," the third episode of Season 1 of iZombie. The other four are Gus Williams, Wally Walker, Marvin Webster and Don Watts.

== NBA career statistics ==
Legend
GP	Games played	GS	Games started	MPG	Minutes per game
FG%	Field goal percentage	3P%	3-point field goal percentage	FT%	Free throw percentage
RPG	Rebounds per game	APG	Assists per game	SPG	Steals per game
BPG	Blocks per game	PPG	Points per game	**Bold**	Career high
†	Won an NBA championship	*	Led the league

=== Regular season ===
Year	Team	GP	GS	MPG	FG%	3P%	FT%	RPG	APG	SPG	BPG	PPG
1971–72	Seattle	33		10.9	.328	–	.759	1.1	1.8	–	–	4.2
1972–73	Seattle	79		29.4	.455	–	.818	4.0	**5.5**	–	–	13.5
1973–74	Seattle	**82**		30.5	.471	–	.863	**4.9**	5.0	1.7	0.2	16.5
1974–75	Seattle	81		33.0	.480	–	.831	4.2	3.5	**2.3**	0.2	21.0
1975–76	Seattle	76		**33.1**	.488	–	.869	4.2	2.7	1.9	0.2	**23.1**
1976–77	Seattle	72		29.1	.479	–	.884	3.2	2.4	1.7	**0.3**	17.2
1977–78	Seattle	72		27.3	.488	–	**.898**	2.6	3.3	1.5	**0.3**	16.6
1978–79†	Seattle	77		25.5	.469	–	.888	2.2	3.4	1.5	**0.3**	14.0
1979–80	Seattle	80		21.3	.479	**.443***	.837	1.9	2.2	0.8	0.2	12.0
1980–81	Seattle	78		25.5	.488	.359	.832	2.2	3.0	1.1	0.2	15.5
1981–82	Seattle	**82**	2	21.8	.455	.325	.860	1.7	2.9	0.8	0.0	11.2
1982–83	Seattle	80	1	17.9	**.520**	.438	.806	1.2	3.0	0.7	0.2	10.2
1983–84	Seattle	71	1	15.9	.510	.265	.895	0.9	2.7	0.7	0.0	8.5
Career		963		25.4	.478	.373	.858	2.7	3.3	1.4	0.2	14.6
All-Star		1	0	24.0	.538	–	–	0.0	1.0	5.0	0.0	14.0

=== Playoffs ===
Year	Team	GP	GS	MPG	FG%	3P%	FT%	RPG	APG	SPG	BPG	PPG
1975	Seattle	8		30.0	.496	–	.844	4.5	**2.9**	2.1	0.1	20.6
1976	Seattle	6		**39.3**	**.511**	–	.795	**4.7**	2.8	**2.2**	0.0	**28.5***
1978	Seattle	**22**		26.1	.449	–	.833	2.1	2.4	1.0	0.1	17.3
1979†	Seattle	17		15.3	.451	–	.824	1.3	2.1	0.5	**0.2**	8.4
1980	Seattle	15		20.9	.440	.294	.857	2.5	2.1	0.1	0.1	12.5
1982	Seattle	8		19.8	.483	**.400**	.700	1.9	2.3	0.6	0.0	11.9
1983	Seattle	2		15.0	.222	–	**1.000**	1.5	2.5	0.5	0.0	3.0
1984	Seattle	5		17.6	.426	.333	.727	1.4	2.0	0.8	0.0	9.8
Career		83		22.9	.461	.310	.819	2.4	2.3	0.9	0.1	14.4

== See also ==
- List of NBA single-game steals leaders
- List of NBA players who have spent their entire career with one franchise
