= Rod Derline =

American basketball player (born 1952)

Personal information
- Born: March 11, 1952 (age 74) Elma, Washington
- Listed height: 6 ft 4 in (1.93 m)
- Listed weight: 175 lb (79 kg)

Career information
- High school: Elma (Elma, Washington)
- College: Seattle (1971–1974)
- NBA draft: 1974: 10th round, 169th overall pick
- Drafted by: Seattle SuperSonics
- Playing career: 1974–1976
- Position: Guard
- Number: 25

Career history
- 1974–1976: Seattle SuperSonics
- Stats at NBA.com
- Stats at Basketball Reference

Rod Derline (born March 11, 1952) is a former professional basketball guard for the Seattle SuperSonics of the National Basketball Association (NBA).

== Amateur career ==
Derline played high school basketball at Elma High School in Elma, Washington, leading the Eagles to the Class A state championship game in 1970. He then played college basketball at Seattle University. He was inducted into Seattle University's basketball hall of fame in 2003.

== NBA career ==
The Seattle SuperSonics chose Derline in the tenth round of the 1974 NBA draft, with the 169th overall pick. Despite his low draft position, Derline made the team, and played two seasons for the SuperSonics until a knee injury ended his career. In 107 total NBA games, Derline averaged 4.8 points per game.

== Career statistics ==
Legend
GP	Games played	GS	Games started	MPG	Minutes per game
FG%	Field goal percentage	3P%	3-point field goal percentage	FT%	Free throw percentage
RPG	Rebounds per game	APG	Assists per game	SPG	Steals per game
BPG	Blocks per game	PPG	Points per game	**Bold**	Career high

=== NBA ===
==== Regular season ====
Year	Team	GP	MPG	FG%	FT%	RPG	APG	SPG	BPG	PPG
1974–75	Seattle	**58**	**11.5**	**.428**	.768	**1.0**	**.8**	**.4**	**.1**	**5.6**
1975–76	Seattle	49	6.9	.403	**.804**	.6	.5	.2	.0	3.9
Career		107	9.4	.419	.786	.8	.7	.3	.0	4.8

==== Playoffs ====
Year	Team	GP	MPG	FG%	FT%	RPG	APG	SPG	BPG	PPG
1975	Seattle	**6**	**10.7**	**.545**	.857	**2.2**	**1.2**	**.3**	.0	**7.0**
1976	Seattle	4	10.3	.200	**1.000**	1.0	.3	**.3**	.0	1.5
Career		10	10.5	.465	.889	1.7	.8	.3	.0	4.8
