= Al Carlson (basketball) =

American basketball player

Personal information
- Born: September 17, 1951 (age 74) Oceanside, California, U.S.
- Listed height: 6 ft 11 in (2.11 m)
- Listed weight: 235 lb (107 kg)

Career information
- High school: Garden Grove (Garden Grove, California)
- College: Oregon (1970–1972)
- NBA draft: 1973: undrafted
- Playing career: 1972–1980
- Position: Center
- Number: 35

Career history
- 1975–1976: Seattle SuperSonics
- 1979–1980: Joventut Badalona
- Stats at NBA.com
- Stats at Basketball Reference

Alvin Harold Carlson (born September 17, 1951) is an American former professional basketball player who played briefly in the National Basketball Association (NBA).

Born in Oceanside, California, Carlson played college basketball for the Oregon Ducks. He played briefly as a sophomore behind Stan Love during the 1970–71 season but then experienced academic issues that prevented him from playing. Carlson returned to the team for the final 16 games of the 1971–72 season and averaged 11.1 points. He left Oregon in 1972 to start his professional career in Belgium where he played alongside Rusty Blair.

He played for the Seattle SuperSonics (1975–76) in the NBA for 28 games.

== Career statistics ==
Legend
GP	Games played	GS	Games started	MPG	Minutes per game
FG%	Field goal percentage	3P%	3-point field goal percentage	FT%	Free throw percentage
RPG	Rebounds per game	APG	Assists per game	SPG	Steals per game
BPG	Blocks per game	PPG	Points per game	**Bold**	Career high

=== NBA ===
==== Regular season ====
Year	Team	GP	MPG	FG%	FT%	RPG	APG	SPG	BPG	PPG
1975–76	Seattle	28	10.0	.342	.621	2.6	.5	.3	.4	2.6
