= Tommy Burleson =

American basketball player (born 1952)

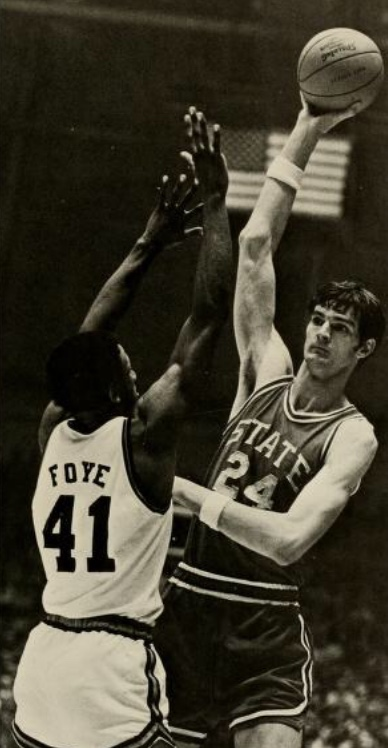
- Burleson at NC State during the 1973–74 season

Personal information
- Born: February 24, 1952 (age 74) Crossnore, North Carolina, U.S.
- Listed height: 7 ft 2 in (2.18 m)
- Listed weight: 225 lb (102 kg)

Career information
- High school: Avery County (Newland, North Carolina)
- College: NC State (1971–1974)
- NBA draft: 1974: 1st round, 3rd overall pick
- Drafted by: Seattle SuperSonics
- Playing career: 1974–1981
- Position: Center
- Number: 16

Career history
- 1974–1977: Seattle SuperSonics
- 1977–1980: Kansas City Kings
- 1980–1981: Atlanta Hawks

Career highlights
- NBA All-Rookie First Team (1975); NCAA champion (1974); Consensus second-team All-American (1973); Second-team All-American – UPI (1974); Third-team All-American – AP, NABC (1974); 2× First-team All-ACC (1972, 1973); Second-team All-ACC (1974); No. 24 jersey honored by NC State Wolfpack; Second-team Parade All-American (1970)

Career NBA statistics
- Points: 4,190 (9.4 ppg)
- Rebounds: 2,794 (6.3 rpg)
- Blocks: 591 (1.3 bpg)
- Stats at NBA.com
- Stats at Basketball Reference
Medals
Men's basketball
Representing United States
Olympic Games
Silver medal – second place	1972 Munich	Team

Tom Loren Burleson (born February 24, 1952) is an American former professional basketball player who played seven seasons in the National Basketball Association (NBA). A 7′2″ center, Burleson played for North Carolina State University's 1974 NCAA national championship team.

== Early life ==
Burleson is a native of Avery County, North Carolina. He was an All-American at Newland High School and Avery County High School, as well as North Carolina State University.

== College ==
As a collegian, Burleson teamed with All-American David Thompson, guard Monte Towe and forward Tim Stoddard (who would go on to have success as a Major League Baseball pitcher) to dethrone UCLA and win the 1974 NCAA Championship. Burleson was the MVP of the 1973 and 1974 ACC Tournaments and was All-Final Four in 1974. Burleson's defense of UCLA superstar Bill Walton was key to the Wolfpack's semifinal win. He was a member of the 1973 World University Games Gold Medal basketball team.

When Burleson was recruited he was officially measured at 7 ft 2 in (2.18 m) tall, but the coaching staff at North Carolina State decided to list him at 7 ft 4 in (2.24 m). Burleson wanted to be listed at his actual height but the coaching staff said he would officially be the tallest player in American basketball and it would bring a lot of good exposure to him and the school. The ploy worked and Burleson was featured on the cover of Sports Illustrated in 1974.

== Olympic team ==
During the 1972 Olympics held in Munich, Burleson unwittingly walked into a parking lot where the Israeli hostages were brought before they were removed by helicopter from the Olympic village and later massacred. Burleson was held at gunpoint against a wall by one of the terrorists, and told not to move or look at the hostages as they came through the parking lot. He is the last athlete who had any contact with the Israeli Olympians 45 minutes before they died.

Burleson was also a member of the 1972 U.S. Olympic Basketball Team that lost a controversial gold medal game to the Soviet Union. The entire 1972 Olympic Basketball team believed they had been cheated and voted unanimously to not accept the silver. Burleson did not play vs. the USSR, suspended by coach Hank Iba for bringing his fiancé to the Olympic village, a violation of team rules.

== Pro career ==
Before the 1974 NBA draft, it appeared almost certain that Burleson would be taken by the Phoenix Suns. But because Seattle traded Dick Snyder to the Cleveland Cavaliers at the last minute, the Sonics gained the right to pick before the Suns, so the two teams vied for a contract with Burleson. After considering both offers, Burleson chose Seattle.

Drafted by the Seattle SuperSonics as the third overall player in the 1974 NBA draft, Burleson entered the league tied with Artis Gilmore and Kareem Abdul-Jabbar as the tallest active NBA player at 7 feet 2 inches. He was named to the 1974–75 NBA All-Rookie Team. Playing under coach Bill Russell, Burleson recorded strong playoff performances in both 1974-75 and 1975-76 for Seattle. For his playoff career, Burleson averaged 20.7 points, 10.2 rebounds, and 1.7 blocks per game in 15 career playoff games. His second season as a professional proved to be his best, as he averaged 15.6 points, 9.0 rebounds, and 1.8 blocks per game. Subsequently, due to a waning passion for basketball and issues regarding his role on the team, his on-court play regressed starting in his third season. In his fifth season, when playing with the Kansas City Kings, Burleson was injured when Maurice Cheeks crashed into his knee while trying to stop Phil Ford from scoring. The injury was instrumental in his steady decline over the next several years.

Burleson was known throughout his amateur and pro career for his shot-blocking abilities. He played seven seasons in the NBA with Seattle, the Kansas City Kings and the Atlanta Hawks.

== Personal life ==
Burleson lives in Avery County, North Carolina with his wife Denise. In 2022 he retired after 28 years as the county's Planning and Inspections/Building and Code Department Director. He previously served as an Avery County commissioner. He also operates Tommy Burleson and Sons Christmas Trees farm.

He is credited with having rescued a woman from an apartment fire in Newland in 1985 and suffered smoke inhalation injury.

He and his wife have three sons: Robert, David, and Quentin. He is an avid supporter of North Carolina State University. He has served for several years as a Special Ambassador to the Grandfather Mountain Highland Games.

== Honors ==
In 2002, Burleson was named to the ACC 50th Anniversary men's basketball team honoring the fifty greatest players in Atlantic Coast Conference history.

== Basketball camp ==
In 1983 Burleson founded the Tommy Burleson Basketball Camp, which is held in collaboration with the Avery County Parks and Recreation Department in North Carolina.

== Career statistics ==
Legend
GP	Games played	GS	Games started	MPG	Minutes per game
FG%	Field goal percentage	3P%	3-point field goal percentage	FT%	Free throw percentage
RPG	Rebounds per game	APG	Assists per game	SPG	Steals per game
BPG	Blocks per game	PPG	Points per game	**Bold**	Career high

=== NBA ===
==== Regular season ====
Year	Team	GP	GS	MPG	FG%	3P%	FT%	RPG	APG	SPG	BPG	PPG
1974–75	Seattle	**82**		23.0	.417		.687	7.0	1.4	.8	**1.9**	10.1
1975–76	Seattle	**82**	**82**	**32.3**	**.481**		.750	**9.0**	**2.2**	**.9**	1.8	**15.6**
1976–77	Seattle	**82**	**82**	22.0	.442		.731	6.7	1.1	**.9**	1.4	9.7
1977–78	Kansas City	76		20.1	.434		**.794**	6.3	1.7	.8	1.1	8.6
1978–79	Kansas City	56		16.6	.459		.716	5.0	.9	.5	1.0	7.8
1979–80	Kansas City	37		7.4	.346	.000	.575	1.9	.5	.2	.4	2.6
1980–81	Atlanta	31		11.7	.414	–	.488	3.0	.4	.3	.6	3.3
Career		446	164	21.1	.445	.000	.726	6.3	1.3	.7	1.3	9.4

==== Playoffs ====
Year	Team	GP	MPG	FG%	FT%	RPG	APG	SPG	BPG	PPG
1975	Seattle	**9**	**40.4**	.513	.750	**10.7**	1.4	.8	**2.0**	20.7
1976	Seattle	6	34.7	**.600**	**.761**	9.5	**1.7**	**1.0**	1.3	**20.8**
Career		15	38.1	.542	.756	10.2	1.5	.9	1.7	20.7
