= Frank Oleynick =

American basketball player

Personal information
- Born: February 20, 1955 (age 71) Bridgeport, Connecticut, U.S.
- Listed height: 6 ft 2 in (1.88 m)
- Listed weight: 185 lb (84 kg)

Career information
- High school: Notre Dame (Fairfield, Connecticut)
- College: Seattle (1972–1975)
- NBA draft: 1975: 1st round, 12th overall pick
- Drafted by: Seattle SuperSonics
- Playing career: 1975–1977
- Position: Point guard
- Number: 44

Career history
- 1975–1977: Seattle SuperSonics

Career highlights
- WCAC Player of the Year (1974); 2× First-team All-WCAC (1974, 1975); Second-team All-WCAC (1973)
- Stats at NBA.com
- Stats at Basketball Reference
Medals
Representing United States
Men's basketball
FIBA World Championship
Bronze medal – third place	1974 Puerto Rico	Team competition

Frank "Magic" Oleynick (born February 20, 1955) is an American former professional basketball player.

Born in Bridgeport, Connecticut, Oleynick played college basketball at Seattle University. In 1974, Oleynick was named West Coast Conference Men's Basketball Player of the Year.

Oleynick played for the US national team in the 1974 FIBA World Championship, winning the bronze medal.

Oleynick was selected by the Seattle SuperSonics in the 1st round (12th pick overall) of the 1975 NBA draft. He played for the Sonics (1975–77) in the NBA for 102 games.

== Career statistics ==
Legend
GP	Games played	GS	Games started	MPG	Minutes per game
FG%	Field goal percentage	3P%	3-point field goal percentage	FT%	Free throw percentage
RPG	Rebounds per game	APG	Assists per game	SPG	Steals per game
BPG	Blocks per game	PPG	Points per game	**Bold**	Career high

=== NBA ===
==== Regular season ====
Year	Team	GP	MPG	FG%	FT%	RPG	APG	SPG	BPG	PPG
1975–76	Seattle	**52**	**12.5**	**.402**	.688	**.9**	1.0	**.4**	**.1**	**5.9**
1976–77	Seattle	50	10.3	.363	**.736**	**.9**	**1.2**	.3	**.1**	4.0
Career		102	11.4	.386	.708	.9	1.1	.3	.1	5.0
