= J. Walter Kennedy Citizenship Award =

National Basketball Association award

- Sport: Basketball
- League: National Basketball Association
- Awarded for: Player, coach or staff member who shows outstanding service and dedication to the community

History
- First award: 1975–76
- Most recent: C.J. McCollum; New Orleans Pelicans

The J. Walter Kennedy Citizenship Award is an annual National Basketball Association (NBA) award given to a player, coach, or staff member who showed "outstanding service and dedication to the community."

The winner was selected by the Pro Basketball Writers Association (PBWA), which represents writers for newspapers, magazines and internet services who cover the NBA on a regular basis. Members of the PBWA nominate players for the award, and then a vote was taken by approximately 150 PBWA members. The person with the highest point total wins the award. The award was named in honor of James Walter Kennedy, the second commissioner (then president) (Note: The official title of the position was NBA President until 1967 when it was changed to NBA Commissioner.) of the NBA.

The award was usually given to a person who made a substantial charitable contribution. For example, Kevin Garnett received the award for the 2005–06 season after donating $1.2 million toward the Hurricane Katrina's relief efforts.

Since its inception, the award has been given to 34 different people. Only one season had joint winners—Michael Cooper and Rory Sparrow in the 1985–86 season. Vlade Divac of Yugoslavia (now Serbia), Dikembe Mutombo of the Democratic Republic of the Congo, Pau Gasol of Spain, Canadians Steve Nash (born in South Africa), Samuel Dalembert (born in Haiti), and Luol Deng of the United Kingdom (born in South Sudan) are the only winners who were not born in the United States. J. J. Barea, the 2018 winner, was born in Puerto Rico, a territory whose native-born residents are U.S. citizens by birth. Mutombo is also the only player to win the award twice. Frank Layden and Joe O'Toole were the only non-players to win the award. Layden, the 1983–84 award recipient, was the head coach for the Utah Jazz, while O'Toole, the 1994–95 award recipient, was the athletic trainer for the Atlanta Hawks.

== Winners ==
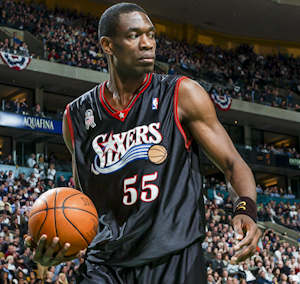
Dikembe Mutombo is the only person to have won the award twice.

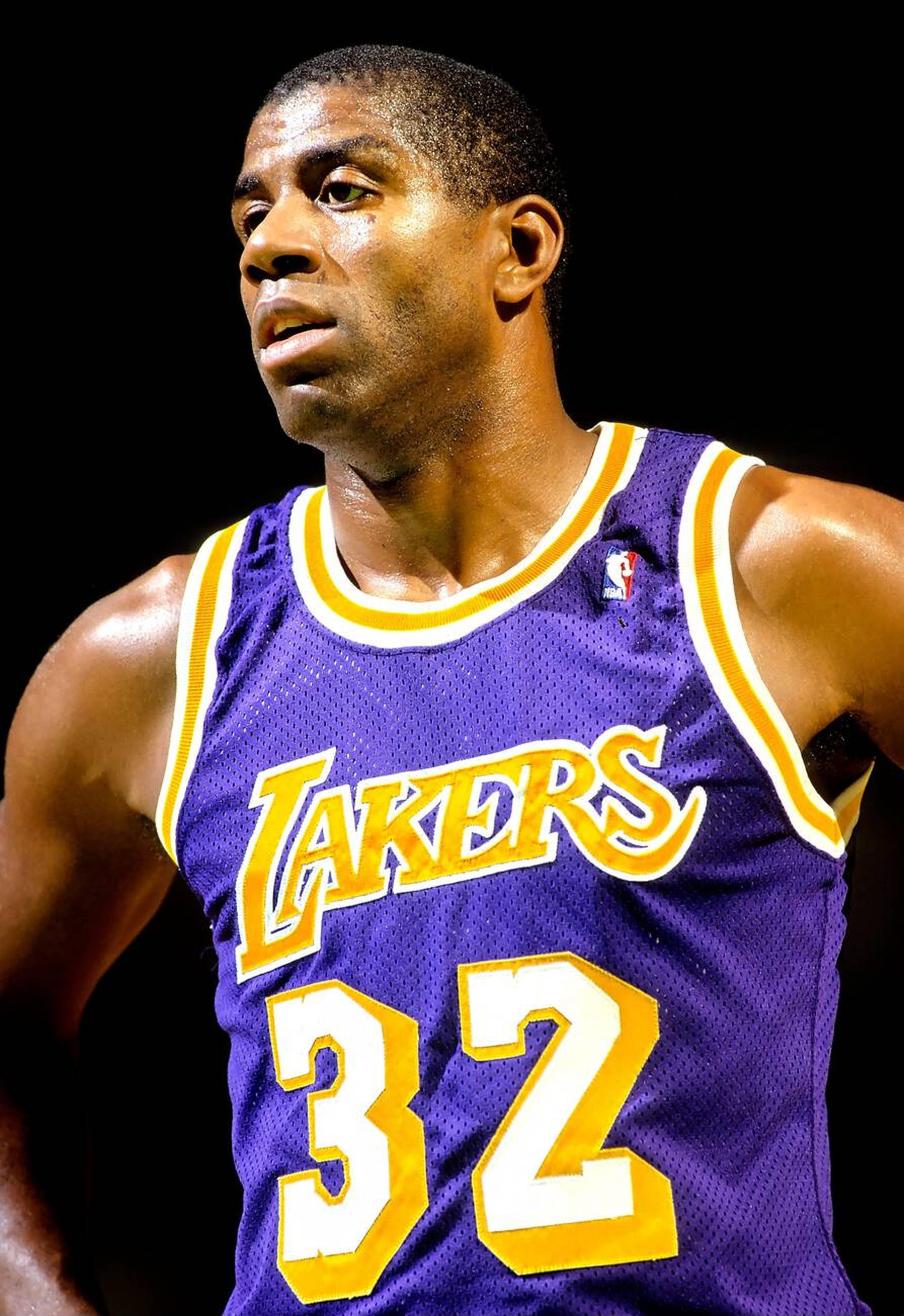
Magic Johnson won the award in the 1991–92 NBA season.

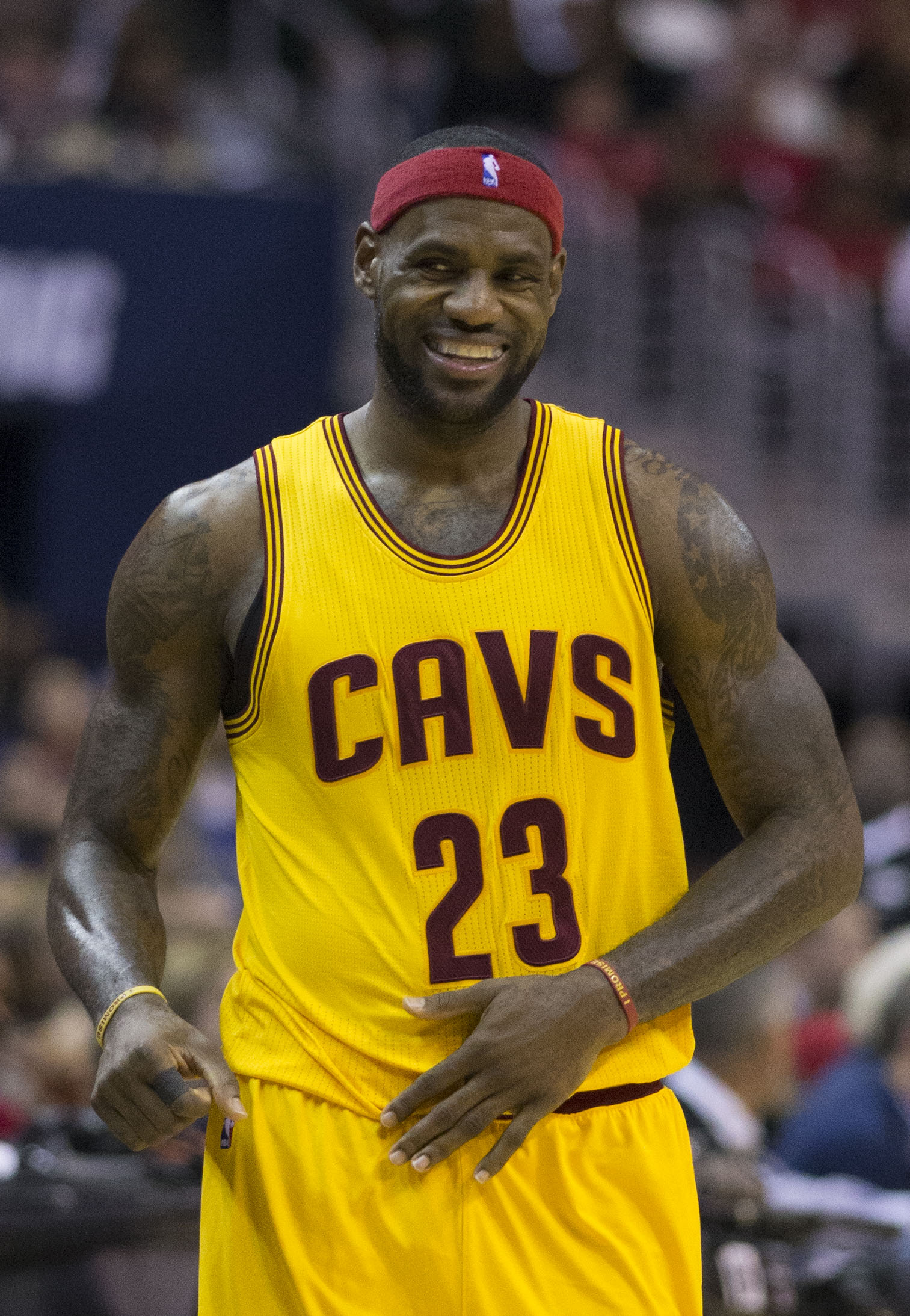
LeBron James won the award in the 2016–17 season.

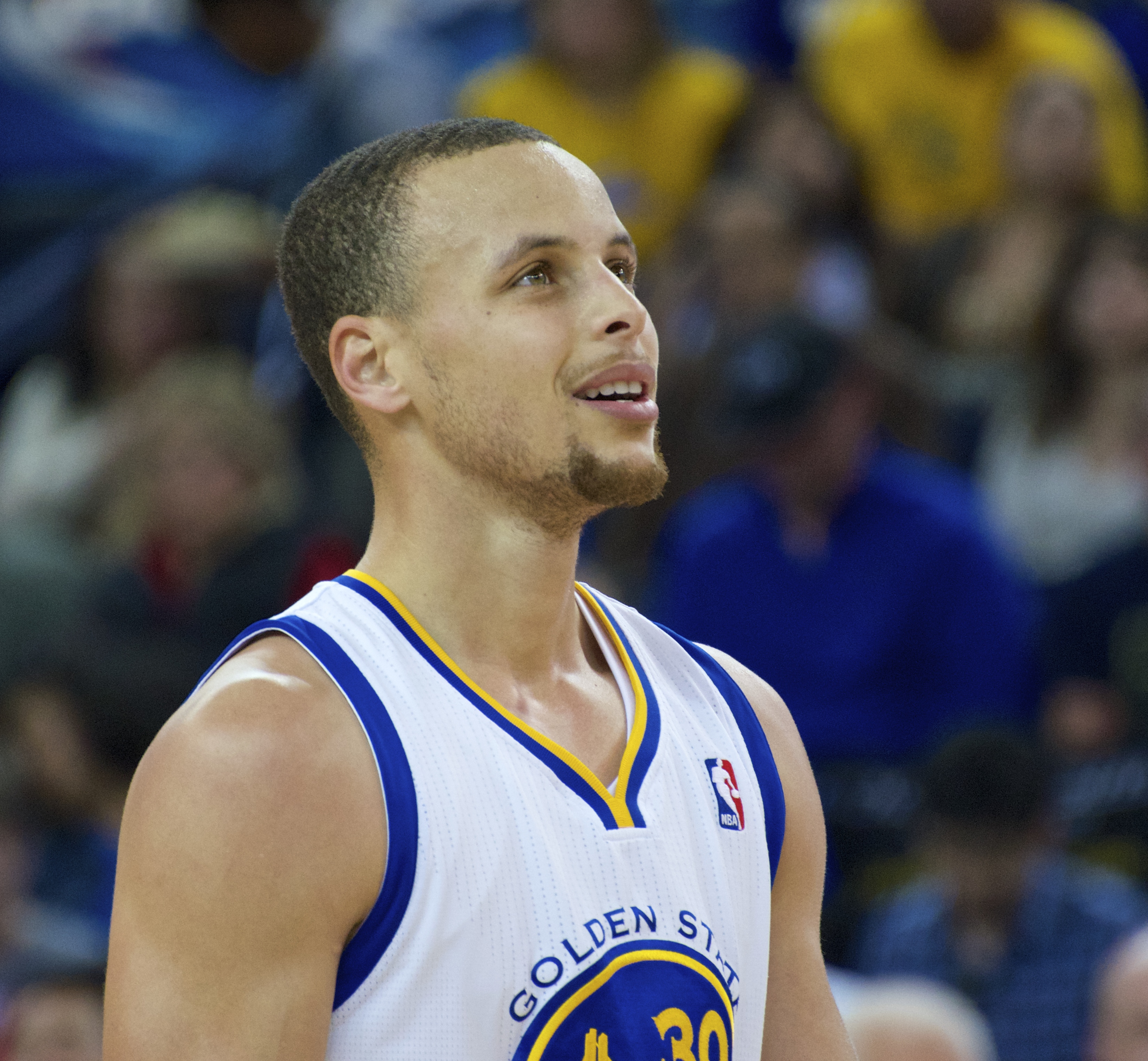
Stephen Curry won the award in the 2022–23 season.

| ^ | Denotes player who is still active in the NBA |
| * | Elected to the Naismith Memorial Basketball Hall of Fame |
| Player (#) | Denotes the number of times the player has received the award |
| Team (#) | Denotes the number of times a player from this team has won |

| Season | Winner | Nationality | Team |
|---|---|---|---|
| 1974–75 | Wes Unseld* | United States | Washington Bullets |
| 1975–76 | Slick Watts | United States | Seattle SuperSonics |
| 1976–77 | Dave Bing* | United States | Washington Bullets (2) |
| 1977–78 | Bob Lanier* | United States | Detroit Pistons |
| 1978–79 | Calvin Murphy* | United States | Houston Rockets |
| 1979–80 | Austin Carr | United States | Cleveland Cavaliers |
| 1980–81 | Mike Glenn | United States | New York Knicks |
| 1981–82 | Kent Benson | United States | Detroit Pistons (2) |
| 1982–83 | Julius Erving* | United States | Philadelphia 76ers |
| 1983–84 | Frank Layden | United States | Utah Jazz |
| 1984–85 | Dan Issel* | United States | Denver Nuggets |
| 1985–86 (Note: Denotes seasons in which joint winners were named) | Michael Cooper* | United States | Los Angeles Lakers |
| 1985–86 | Rory Sparrow | United States | New York Knicks (2) |
| 1986–87 | Isiah Thomas* | United States | Detroit Pistons (3) |
| 1987–88 | Alex English* | United States | Denver Nuggets (2) |
| 1988–89 | Thurl Bailey | United States | Utah Jazz (2) |
| 1989–90 | Doc Rivers | United States | Atlanta Hawks |
| 1990–91 | Kevin Johnson | United States | Phoenix Suns |
| 1991–92 | Magic Johnson* | United States | Los Angeles Lakers (2) |
| 1992–93 | Terry Porter | United States | Portland Trail Blazers |
| 1993–94 | Joe Dumars* | United States | Detroit Pistons (4) |
| 1994–95 | Joe O'Toole | United States | Atlanta Hawks (2) |
| 1995–96 | Chris Dudley | United States | Portland Trail Blazers (2) |
| 1996–97 | P. J. Brown | United States | Miami Heat |
| 1997–98 | Steve Smith | United States | Atlanta Hawks (3) |
| 1998–99 | Brian Grant | United States | Portland Trail Blazers (3) |
| 1999–00 | Vlade Divac* | Federal Republic of Yugoslavia | Sacramento Kings |
| 2000–01 | Dikembe Mutombo* | Democratic Republic of the Congo | Philadelphia 76ers (2) |
| 2001–02 | Alonzo Mourning* | United States | Miami Heat (2) |
| 2002–03 | David Robinson* | United States | San Antonio Spurs |
| 2003–04 | Reggie Miller* | United States | Indiana Pacers |
| 2004–05 | Eric Snow | United States | Cleveland Cavaliers (2) |
| 2005–06 | Kevin Garnett* | United States | Minnesota Timberwolves |
| 2006–07 | Steve Nash* | Canada | Phoenix Suns (2) |
| 2007–08 | Chauncey Billups* | United States | Detroit Pistons (5) |
| 2008–09 | Dikembe Mutombo* (2) | Democratic Republic of the Congo | Houston Rockets (2) |
| 2009–10 | Samuel Dalembert | Canada | Philadelphia 76ers (3) |
| 2010–11 | Ron Artest (Note: Ron Artest changed his name to Metta World Peace on September 16, 2011.) | United States | Los Angeles Lakers (3) |
| 2011–12 | Pau Gasol* | Spain | Los Angeles Lakers (4) |
| 2012–13 | Kenneth Faried | United States | Denver Nuggets (3) |
| 2013–14 | Luol Deng | United Kingdom | Cleveland Cavaliers (3) |
| 2014–15 | Joakim Noah | France | Chicago Bulls |
| 2015–16 | Wayne Ellington | United States | Brooklyn Nets |
| 2016–17 | LeBron James^ | United States | Cleveland Cavaliers (4) |
| 2017–18 | J.J. Barea | Puerto Rico | Dallas Mavericks |
| 2018–19 | Damian Lillard^ | United States | Portland Trail Blazers (4) |
| 2019–20 | Malcolm Brogdon | United States | Indiana Pacers (2) |
| 2020–21 | Not awarded—COVID-19 pandemic | | |
| 2021–22 | Not awarded—COVID-19 pandemic | | |
| 2022–23 | Stephen Curry^ | United States | Golden State Warriors |
| 2023–24 | CJ McCollum^ | United States | New Orleans Pelicans |

== Multi-time winners ==
| Awards | Player | Team | Years |
|---|---|---|---|
| 2 | (Democratic Republic of the Congo) Dikembe Mutombo | Philadelphia 76ers (1) / Houston Rockets (1) | 2001, 2009 |

== Teams ==
| Awards | Teams | Years |
|---|---|---|
| 5 | Detroit Pistons | 1978, 1982, 1987, 1994, 2008 |
| 4 | Cleveland Cavaliers | 1980, 2005, 2014, 2017 |
| 4 | Los Angeles Lakers | 1986, 1992, 2011, 2012 |
| 4 | Portland Trail Blazers | 1993, 1996, 1999, 2019 |
| 3 | Atlanta Hawks | 1990, 1995, 1998 |
| 3 | Denver Nuggets | 1985, 1988, 2013 |
| 3 | Philadelphia 76ers | 1983, 2001, 2010 |
| 2 | Houston Rockets | 1979, 2009 |
| 2 | Indiana Pacers | 2004, 2020 |
| 2 | Miami Heat | 1997, 2002 |
| 2 | New York Knicks | 1981, 1986 |
| 2 | Phoenix Suns | 1991, 2007 |
| 2 | Utah Jazz | 1984, 1989 |
| 2 | Washington Wizards / Washington Bullets | 1975, 1977 |
| 1 | Brooklyn Nets | 2016 |
| 1 | Chicago Bulls | 2015 |
| 1 | Dallas Mavericks | 2018 |
| 1 | Golden State Warriors | 2023 |
| 1 | Minnesota Timberwolves | 2006 |
| 1 | New Orleans Pelicans | 2024 |
| 1 | Sacramento Kings | 2000 |
| 1 | San Antonio Spurs | 2003 |
| 1 | Oklahoma City Thunder / Seattle SuperSonics | 1976 |
| 0 | Los Angeles Clippers | None |
| 0 | Milwaukee Bucks | None |
| 0 | Boston Celtics | None |
| 0 | Charlotte Hornets | None |
| 0 | Memphis Grizzlies | None |
| 0 | Toronto Raptors | None |
| 0 | Orlando Magic | None |

== See also ==
- NBA records
- Allstate AFCA Good Works Team
- NBA Community Assist Award (basketball)
