= Ken McKenzie (basketball) =

Former Canadian Basketball Player

Personal information
- Born: Port Coquitlam, British Columbia, Canada
- Listed height: 6 ft 9 in (2.06 m)
- Listed weight: 225 lb (102 kg)

Career information
- High school: Centennial Secondary School (Coquitlam, British Colubia)
- College: University of Montana (1972-1975)
- NBA draft: 1975: 8th round, 138th overall pick
- Drafted by: Seattle SuperSonics
- Position: Center
- Number: 12

Career highlights
- Canadian national team (1972-1976); Big Sky Conference Honorable Mention (1973); Big Sky MVP (1974, 1975); Big Sky First-team All-star (1974, 1975); BC Basketball Hall of Fame Inductee (2008)
- Stats at Basketball Reference

Ken McKenzie is a former Canadian basketball player. He played for the Canadian national team; had a successful university career at the University of Montana; has been described as one of the best centers in Canadian history; and was drafted by the Seattle SuperSonics in the 1975 NBA draft.

== University ==
McKenzie played at the high school level at Port Moody Secondary School until the school burned down in 1969, requiring him to transfer to Centennial Secondary School for his senior year. McKenzie was offered scholarships at the University of California, Berkeley and the University of Montana, ultimately deciding to attend the University of Montana.

McKenzie was a starter in each of his seasons with the Grizzlies. In his freshman year, he averaged 12 ppg and 9.5 rebounds per game, earning Big Sky honorable mention recognition. He was named the Big Sky MVP twice (1974, 1975), in both of these seasons averaging around 18 ppg and 11 rebounds per game. In these two seasons (1974, 1975), McKenzie was also named a First-team Big Sky all-star. During his career at Montana, McKenzie averaged a double-double (16.3 ppg, 10.5 rbg).

The Grizzlies performed well under McKenzie's leadership. In 1974, the Grizzlies finished second overall in the Big Sky Conference. In 1975, the Grizzlies were the Big Sky champions, resulting in the Grizzlies qualifying for the NCAA tournament (for the first time in Grizzlies' history). The Grizzlies reached the Sweet Sixteen and played top-ranked UCLA, who had future NBA players Marques Johnson and Richard Washington and were coached by the legendary coach John Wooden. The Grizzlies ultimately lost by three points (67–64), led by McKenzie's 20 points and 10 rebounds. UCLA went to win the NCAA tournament that year, which was UCLA's 10th championship in 12 years.

=== University Statistics ===
Year	Team	GP	FG	FG%	FT	FT%	Rbds	RPG	Pts	PPG
1972-73	Montana	26	129-301	42.9%	54-92	58.7%	247	9.5	312	12.0
1973-74	Montana	27	222-419	53.0%	61-96	63.5%	301	11.1	505	18.7
1974-75	Montana	29	222-419	48.3%	58-89	65.2%	311	10.7	518	17.9
Career	Montana	82	581-1196	48.6%	173-277	62.5%	859	10.5	1335	16.3

== International ==
McKenzie represented Canada on their national team from 1972 to 1976. This included representing Canada at the 1973 World Student Games and the 1974 FIBA World Championship. McKenzie was also selected to Canada's 1976 Olympic team; however, McKenzie suffered a severe knee injury in an exhibition game against the USA days before said Olympics, precluding him from competing.

McKenzie performed well in international tournaments. In the 1974 FIBA World Cup, McKenzie was Canada's third overall scorer with 11.9 ppg. He had notable performances against the US, where he was Canada's leading scorer with 18 points; against Yugoslavia, where he was Canada's leading scorer with 25 points; against Puerto Rico, where he was Canada's leading scorer with 14 points; and against the Soviet Union, where he was Canada's second-leading scorer with 9 points.

== Professional ==
McKenzie was drafted by the Seattle SuperSonics in the 1975 NBA Draft in the 8th round and as the 138th overall pick. McKenzie decided to maintain his amateur status for the 1976 Olympics and instead played a year professionally in France in the 1975–1976 season.

== Post-career recognition ==
McKenzie was inducted into the BC Basketball Hall of Fame in 2008. The 1974-1975 University of Montana team of which he was part was inducted into the university's sports hall of fame in 2010.

== Personal life ==
McKenzie was born in Port Coquitlam, British Columbia, Canada. After the 1976 Olympics and his knee injury, McKenzie returned to Port Coquitlam and, like his father, became a railroad engineer where he worked for 29 years before retiring around 2008. His daughter, Joby McKenzie, was also a successful basketball player and like her father, was inducted into the BC Basketball Hall of Fame (2015).
