= Slick Watts =

American basketball player (1951–2025)

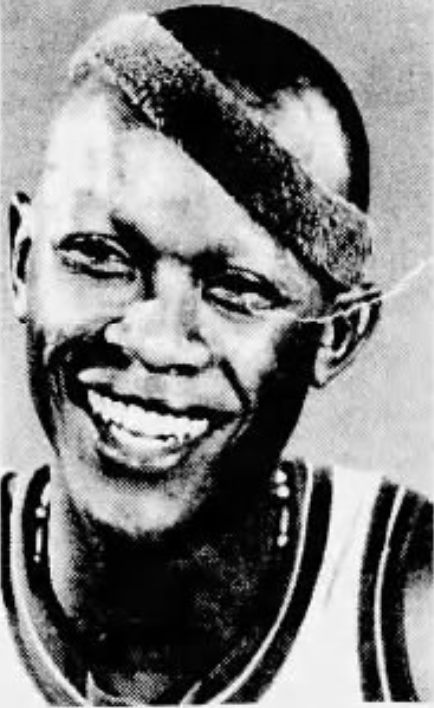
- Watts c. 1977

Personal information
- Born: July 22, 1951 Rolling Fork, Mississippi, U.S.
- Died: March 15, 2025 (aged 73) Seattle, Washington, U.S.
- Listed height: 6 ft 1 in (1.85 m)
- Listed weight: 175 lb (79 kg)

Career information
- High school: Henry Weather (Rolling Fork, Mississippi)
- College: Grand View (1969–1970); Xavier (Louisiana) (1970–1973)
- NBA draft: 1973: undrafted
- Playing career: 1973–1981
- Position: Point guard
- Number: 13, 14, 00

Career history
- 1973–1978: Seattle SuperSonics
- 1978: New Orleans Jazz
- 1978–1979: Houston Rockets
- 1980–1981: Anchorage Northern Knights

Career highlights
- NBA All-Defensive First Team (1976); NBA assists leader (1976); NBA steals leader (1976); J. Walter Kennedy Citizenship Award (1976)

Career NBA statistics
- Points: 3,901 (8.9 ppg)
- Rebounds: 1,398 (3.2 rpg)
- Assists: 2,678 (6.1 apg)
- Stats at NBA.com
- Stats at Basketball Reference

Donald Earl "Slick" Watts (July 22, 1951 – March 15, 2025) was an American professional basketball player in the National Basketball Association (NBA). Playing with the Seattle SuperSonics in 1976, he became the first player to lead the league in both assists and steals. He remained a favorite of Sonics fans after his basketball career.

== Early life ==
Watts was born on July 22, 1951, in Rolling Fork, Mississippi. His father was a mechanic and his mother was a teacher. When Watts was 13, a football injury damaged his scalp, causing his hair to grow in unusual patches. This led him to shave his head.

== College career ==
Watts attended Grand View Junior College before transferring to Xavier University of Louisiana in 1970, where he played college basketball for three years under coach Bob Hopkins, and alongside future NBA player Bruce Seals.

For the 1971–72 season, Watts and Seals led the Gold Rush to its first NAIA District 30 Men's Basketball championship, defeating Nicholls State 85–83, before losing to Westmont in the 1972 NAIA basketball tournament semi-finals 71–59.

During his final season, Watts led the Gold Rush to their second consecutive NAIA District 30 Championship, defeating Dillard 101–80. In the 1973 NAIA basketball tournament Watts and his teammates upset Sam Houston State, 67–60, in the second round. At the time, the Bearkats were ranked first in the country in all college division polls and had gone 34 games, over a two-year period, without a loss. Xavier eventually lost in the semi-finals to Maryland-Eastern Shore 87–80.

== NBA career ==
Watts was not selected in the 1973 NBA draft, though he was chosen by the Memphis Tams in the second round of the 1973 ABA supplemental draft. However, Watts' college coach at Xavier University, Bob Hopkins, was a cousin of NBA legend Bill Russell, who at the time was the coach and general manager for the Seattle SuperSonics. Russell gave Watts a tryout and signed him as a rookie free agent.

Despite coming off the bench, Watts led the Sonics in assists per game (5.7) as a rookie in 1973–74. His playing time increased the next season, as Watts led the franchise to its first playoff berth. On February 21, 1975, Watts recorded his first career triple-double with 12 points, 10 rebounds, and 11 assists, while adding four steals, in a 110–108 win over the Atlanta Hawks. Two days later, Watts recorded a career-high nine steals, while also scoring 13 points and adding 14 assists, during a 114–100 loss to the Philadelphia 76ers.

After signing a three-year, $100,000 contract, Watts became a starter for the 1975–76 season, and would go on to lead the NBA in total assists, assists per game, total steals, and steals per game, while making the NBA All-Defensive First Team. He was the first player to lead the NBA in assists and steals in the same season. In 1976, Watts' energetic playing style, unique look, and rapport with the fans led Sports Illustrated to call him "the most popular athlete ever to perform in the state of Washington". He also received the J. Walter Kennedy Citizenship Award for his outstanding service to the community. Watts followed with another productive year in the 1976–77 season, averaging 8.0 assists and 2.7 steals per game.

At the start of the 1977–78 season, Watts was re-united with Hopkins, who was hired as the Sonics' new head coach. But Hopkins was fired after a 5–17 start, and new coach Lenny Wilkens made some lineup changes, one of which was to replace Watts with Dennis Johnson. Watts was eventually traded mid-season to the New Orleans Jazz for a first-round draft pick.

Watts did not play again in the NBA after the 1978–79 season. He played 4 1/2 years with the Sonics, half a season with the New Orleans Jazz, and one season with the Houston Rockets.

In December 1980, Watts joined the Anchorage Northern Knights of the Continental Basketball Association (CBA) with the intent of making it back to the NBA. He averaged 2.3 points and 2.7 assists in 7 games played. Watts departed the team without notice in January 1981 which caused the CBA to issue a release titled "Has Anyone Seen Slick Watts" that urged anyone who saw Watts to inform him that he had been waived. Northern Knights head coach Bill Klucas commented after Watts' departure: "Slick couldn't play a lick."

He gained the nickname "Slick" because he was one of the first players to shave his head, unusual at the time. In 1974, The News Tribune wrote, "In this day of long hair, Watts is a very unusual person". He was also known for wearing his headband off-center.

== NBA career statistics ==
Legend
GP	Games played	GS	Games started	MPG	Minutes per game
FG%	Field goal percentage	3P%	3-point field goal percentage	FT%	Free throw percentage
RPG	Rebounds per game	APG	Assists per game	SPG	Steals per game
BPG	Blocks per game	PPG	Points per game	**Bold**	Career high
*	Led the league

=== Regular season ===
Year	Team	GP	GS	MPG	FG%	3P%	FT%	RPG	APG	SPG	BPG	PPG
1973–74	Seattle	62	–	23.0	.388	–	**.645**	2.9	5.7	1.9	0.2	8.0
1974–75	Seattle	**82**	–	25.1	.421	–	.608	3.2	6.1	2.3	0.1	6.8
1975–76	Seattle	**82**	–	**33.9**	**.427**	–	.578	**4.5**	**8.1***	**3.2***	0.2	**13.0**
1976–77	Seattle	79	–	33.3	.422	–	.587	3.9	8.0	2.7	0.3	**13.0**
1977–78	Seattle	32	–	25.3	.404	–	.566	2.5	4.2	1.7	**0.4**	7.8
1977–78	New Orleans	39	–	19.9	.381	–	.602	2.5	4.1	1.4	**0.4**	7.2
1978–79	Houston	61	–	17.1	.405	–	.612	1.7	4.0	1.2	0.2	3.7
Career		437	–	26.3	.413	–	.597	3.2	6.1	2.2	0.3	8.9

=== Playoffs ===
Year	Team	GP	GS	MPG	FG%	3P%	FT%	RPG	APG	SPG	BPG	PPG
1975	Seattle	**9**	–	31.3	**.462**	–	.538	**3.7**	7.1	**3.0**	0.4	11.1
1976	Seattle	6	–	**32.8**	.435	–	.478	3.0	**8.2**	2.0	0.3	**11.8**
1979	Houston	2	–	21.5	.400	–	**.667**	3.5	3.5	2.0	**0.5**	7.0
Career		17	–	30.7	.446	–	.519	3.4	7.1	2.5	0.4	10.9

== Later years ==
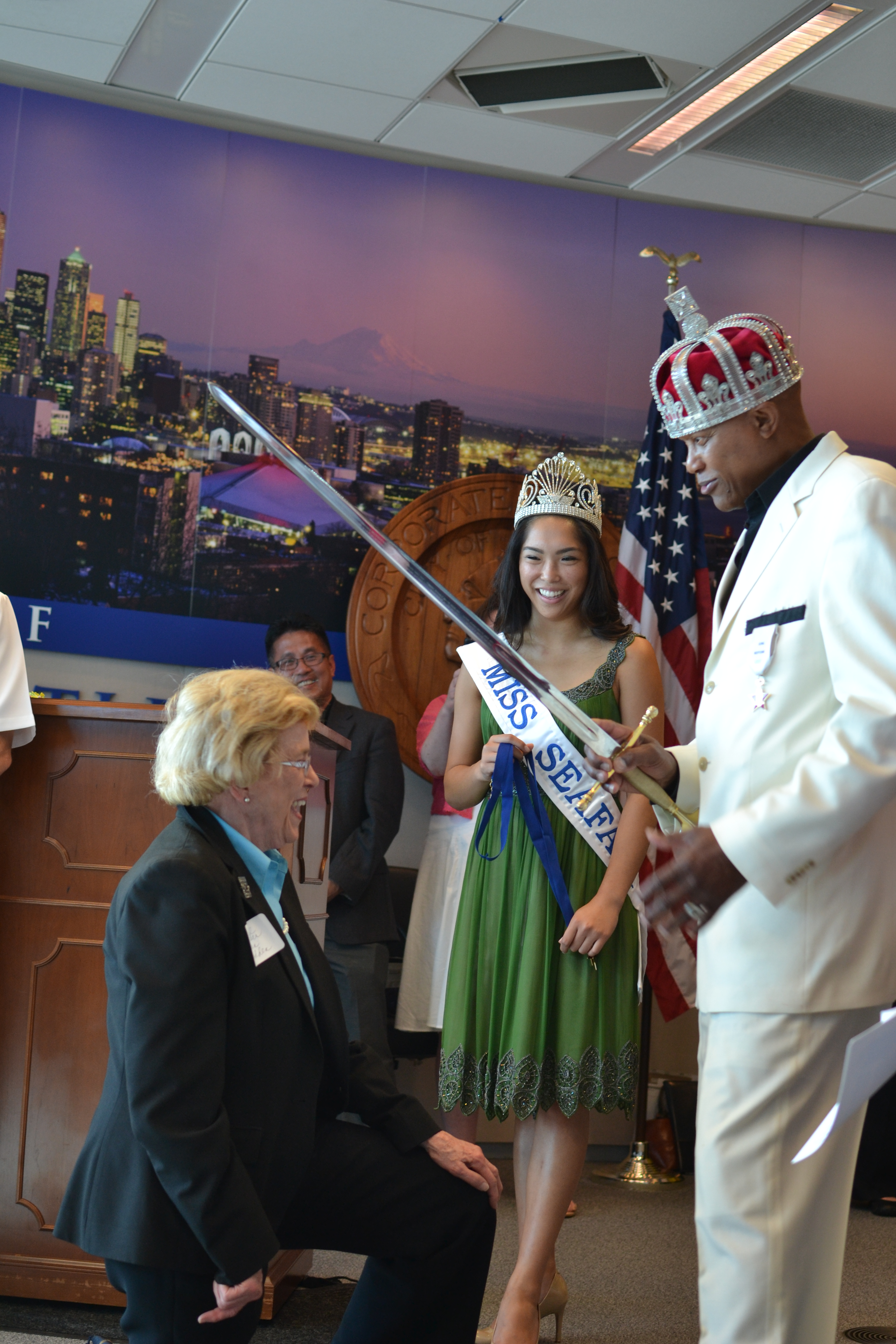
Watts as Seafair King, granting a "knighthood" to Seattle City Council member Jean Godden, 2012.

After his playing career, Watts became a physical education teacher at Dearborn Park Elementary School and High Point Elementary School. He coached basketball at Franklin High School in the Seattle area and took up tennis.

He ended his post-basketball career teaching physical education for nearly 20 years at Martin Luther King Jr. Elementary (formerly named Brighton Elementary) in Seattle before retiring in 2017.

Despite a somewhat short tenure with the SuperSonics, Watts remained a fan favorite. He was named to the Sonics' 40th anniversary team before they moved to Oklahoma City. The Seattle rap duo Blue Scholars named a song about the SuperSonics after him. Watts was a staple at Seattle sporting events, attending SuperSonics and Seattle Storm games. "Slick was a champion for the Storm and a beloved member of the Seattle community”, wrote the Storm organization. The Seattle Times called him "an ambassador of Seattle basketball" and "a generational figure in the Seattle hoops scene".

== Personal life and death ==
Watts' sons both played college basketball, Tony at Mississippi State from 1988–92 and Donald at the University of Washington from 1995–99. A grandson, Isaiah, currently plays at Maryland, and a granddaughter, Jadyn, plays at Western Washington.

Watts dealt with sarcoidosis, an inflammation of the lungs. In 2001, Watts spent 22 days in a hospital with sarcoidosis, which caused his weight to drop by almost 50 lb (23 kg) before his condition improved. In April 2021, three months before his 70th birthday, Watts suffered a major stroke. He died on March 15, 2025, at the age of 73.

== See also ==
- List of NBA single-game steals leaders
- List of NBA single-season steals per game leaders
