= Bruce Seals =

American basketball player (1953–2020)

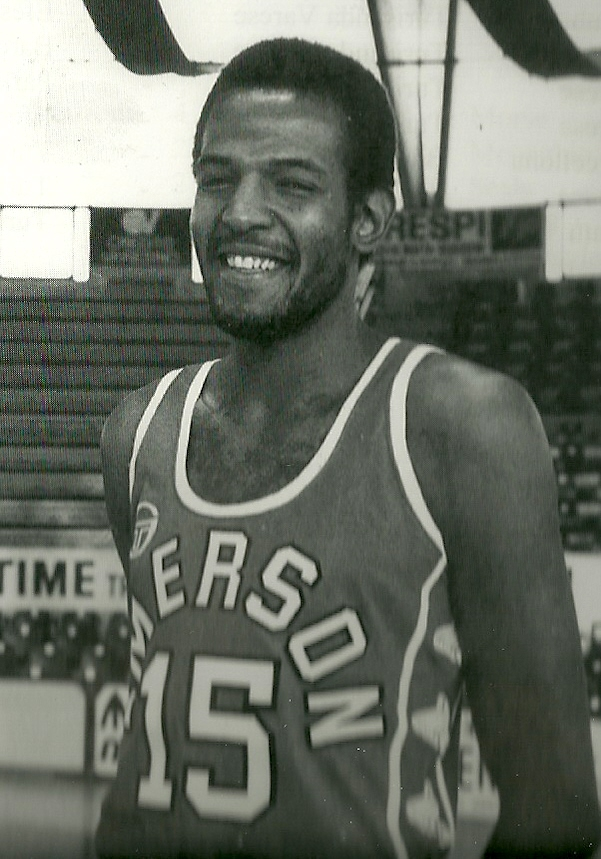
- Seals with Varese in 1979–80

Personal information
- Born: June 18, 1953 New Orleans, Louisiana, U.S.
- Died: December 15, 2020 (aged 67) Boston, Massachusetts, U.S.
- Listed height: 6 ft 8 in (2.03 m)
- Listed weight: 210 lb (95 kg)

Career information
- High school: Booker T. Washington (New Orleans, Louisiana)
- College: Xavier (Louisiana) (1971–1973)
- NBA draft: 1975: 2nd round, 21st overall pick
- Drafted by: Seattle SuperSonics
- Playing career: 1973–1984
- Position: Power forward / small forward
- Number: 10, 45

Career history
- 1973–1975: Utah Stars
- 1975–1978: Seattle SuperSonics
- 1979–1980: Pallacanestro Varese
- 1981–1982: Reyer Venezia
- 1983–1984: Alpe Bergamo

Career highlights
- FIBA Saporta Cup Finals Top Scorer (1980); NAIA All-American (1973)

Career ABA and NBA statistics
- Points: 3,107 (8.9 ppg)
- Rebounds: 1,463 (4.2 rpg)
- Blocks: 208 (0.6 bpg)
- Stats at NBA.com
- Stats at Basketball Reference

Bruce A. Seals (June 18, 1953 – December 15, 2020) was an American basketball player in the American Basketball Association (ABA) and the National Basketball Association (NBA).

Seals was drafted in the first round by the Utah Stars, playing two seasons in the ABA before being selected in the second round of the 1975 NBA draft by the Seattle SuperSonics. He played three seasons in the NBA.

Seals' career spanned five seasons, two leagues, primarily at the power forward position. He retired from the NBA in 1978 and went on to play in the Italian League.

In his later years, Seals worked with the Boys and Girls Clubs of America, teaching inner city youth the power of the game. He had been with Boys and Girls Clubs of Dorchester since 1990.

== Biography ==
Born in New Orleans, Louisiana, Seals attended high school at Booker T. Washington High School in New Orleans. In 1971, Seals was named Louisiana's Most Valuable High School basketball player.

=== Collegiate career ===
Seals attended Xavier University of Louisiana, where he played basketball under coach Bob Hopkins, and alongside his teammate and future NBA star Donald "Slick" Watts. For the 1972 season, Watts and Seals would lead the Gold Rush to its first NAIA District 30 Men's Basketball championship defeating Nicholls State University 85–83, but would lose to Westmont in the 1972 NAIA basketball tournament semi-finals, 71–59. For his Junior, and final season, he and Watts would lead the Xavier Gold Rush to their second consecutive NAIA District 30 Championship, defeating Dillard University 101–80. In the 1973 NAIA basketball tournament they would upset Sam Houston State University, 67–60, in the second round. At the time, the Bearkats were ranked first in the country in all college division polls and had gone 34 games, over a two-year period, without a loss. The Xavier Gold Rush would eventually lose in the semi-finals to Maryland-Eastern Shore 87–80. For his 1972–73 season, Seals would earn NAIA All American and Associated Press All American honors. Seals would leave Xavier after his Junior year to sign with the Utah Stars.

=== 1973–74 season ===
Seals was selected by the Utah Stars in the first round of the ABA draft. The Utah Stars had posted the best record in the ABA Western Division in the previous season (55–29 in the 1972–73 season).

In his first regular season with the Utah Stars, Seals played 78 games, averaging 17.4 minutes per game, with 7.0 points per game. The Utah Stars won the Western Division (51–33).

In the post-season, the Utah Stars defeated the San Diego Conquistadors to win the Western Division semifinals. Thereafter, they beat the Indiana Pacers in the Western Division finals. The Utah Stars lost the championship series, though, to the New York Nets. Seals contributed 89 points in the post-season over 15 games, playing 260 minutes for the Utah Stars, with 5.9 points per game.

=== 1974–75 season ===
In his second regular season with the Utah Stars, Seals played only 35 games, averaging 10.6 minutes per game, with 4.0 points per game. He was joined by a strong high school center the Stars drafted, Moses Malone. The Utah Stars finished in fourth place in the Western Division, an upset, with a record of 38–46.

In the post-season, the Utah Stars were defeated in the first round by the Denver Nuggets in a five-game series. While Seals played very little, he produced over a point per minute. He racked up 24 points in the post-season over 3 games, playing 41 minutes, with 8 ppg for the Utah Stars.

=== 1975–76 season ===
Seals was drafted by the Seattle SuperSonics in the second round of the 1975 NBA draft and played 81 games for the Sonics the 1975–76 season. He averaged 30.1 minutes per game, with 11.8 points per game (ppg) and contributed a total of 957 points to the Seattle SuperSonics. Seals performed well in the post-season, playing 6 games, racking up 181 minutes on the court, and supplying 78 points, with 13 ppg for the Seattle SuperSonics.

The 1975–76 season saw the Seattle SuperSonics finishing the season at second-place in the Pacific Division of the Western Conference, with a record of 43–39 (.524) behind the Golden State Warriors who led the division and conference with a record of 59–23 (.720). The SuperSonics’ record placed them in the second place spot across the entire Western Conference, which consisted of nine teams, still only being led by the Golden State Warriors. Seals finished the season tied for the fourth highest number of personal fouls in the league, with 314.

=== 1976–77 season ===
Seals played 81 games for the Seattle SuperSonics in the 1976–77 season. He averaged 24.4 minutes per game, with 11.0 points per game and contributed a total of 894 points to the Sonics in the season. The 1976–77 season saw the Seattle SuperSonics finishing the season near the bottom of the division and conference with a 40–42 record (.488), among eleven teams that comprised the Western Conference.

=== 1977–78 season ===
Seals played 73 games for the Seattle SuperSonics in the 1977–78 season. He averaged 18.1 minutes per game, with 7.8 points per game. He contributed a total of 571 points to the Seattle SuperSonics this season.

Seals played very little in the post-season, playing in 9 games, but only racking up 92 minutes on the court. He contributed a total of 27 points for the Seattle SuperSonics in the post-season.

The 1977–78 season saw the Seattle SuperSonics finishing the season fourth in the eleven-team Western Conference, third in the Pacific Division with a record of 47–35 (.573). Seattle managed to win the Western Conference, and led the Washington Bullets before losing the series in the NBA Finals.

While Seattle boasted the third highest ranked defense in the NBA at the close of the season, they also represented the second worst offensive ranking among twenty-two teams.

== Statistics ==
=== ABA career ===
In his two years with the Utah Stars in the American Basketball Association, Seals played 113 games, averaging 15.3 minutes per game, with 6.1 points per game. He contributed a total of 685 points to the Utah Stars.

In his two years in the post-season, he played 18 games, playing 301 minutes on the court, sinking 113 points for the Utah Stars. This is 16.7 minutes per game and 6.3 points per game in the post-season.

Bruce Seals had the forty-third highest career blocks in the American Basketball Association, with 73, but his 73 blocks occurred over only two years. Additionally, Seals holds the ninety-fifth highest career steals record in the ABA, with 72 steals.

=== NBA career ===
In his three seasons in the NBA, Bruce Seals played in 235 games, averaging 24.4 minutes per game, and averaging 10.3 points. He contributed a total of 2422 points to the Seattle SuperSonics over his three years in the NBA.

== Later years ==
In speaking of his basketball experiences, Seals said "the game was good to me... I saw the world." After leaving the Seattle SuperSonics, Seals did just that with a stint in the Italian leagues. Years later, Bruce married and had two children. In 1990, Seals and his family moved to Boston. Seals came to Boys and Girls Clubs of Dorchester as Assistant Athletic Director. One year later, in 1991, Seals assumed the position of Director. He was known to suspend kids without bias and loved meets with the youth. At the time of his death, Seals worked for the Boys and Girls Clubs of America, teaching inner city youth that basketball is more powerful than violence.

Along with his responsibilities working with the youth of inner city Boston, and being a family man, Seals was also supportive of his niece, former NCAA athlete, Joy Hollingsworth. Hollingsworth, a point guard, played women's basketball for the Division I-A Arizona Wildcats in the Pacific-10 Conference (Pac-10) through the 2006–07 season.

Seals continued to be involved in basketball as an assistant coach at Emerson College in Boston, Massachusetts, under head coach Hank Smith after the 1994–95 season.

Seals died on December 15, 2020, at the age of 67.
