= Seattle SuperSonics all-time roster =

Supersonics' roster

The Seattle SuperSonics were an American professional basketball team based in Seattle, Washington. They played in the Western, Pacific and Northwest divisions of the Western Conference in the National Basketball Association (NBA). The team joined the NBA in 1967 as an expansion team, and won their first and only NBA Championship out of 22 playoffs appearances in the 1979 NBA Finals. The SuperSonics played their home games mainly at the Seattle Center Coliseum, the Kingdome during eight seasons, and the Tacoma Dome for one season while the Coliseum was being remodeled and later renamed KeyArena.

The SuperSonics started building their roster in the 1967 NBA draft and the 1967 NBA expansion draft. Since then 257 players have appeared in at least one game for the franchise. Nine players were inducted in the Naismith Memorial Basketball Hall of Fame, Ray Allen, Patrick Ewing, Spencer Haywood, Šarūnas Marčiulionis, Gary Payton, David Thompson, who played no more than two seasons with the Sonics, and Dennis Johnson, Jack Sikma, and Lenny Wilkens, who were part of the 1979 Championship team, with the former as player and the latter as coach. Wilkens was also inducted to the Hall of Fame as coach, having the longest career-span of any coach in NBA history.

*	Denotes player who has been elected to the Naismith Memorial Basketball Hall of Fame
^{^}	Denotes player whose jersey has been retired by the SuperSonics
^{+}	Denotes player who has been elected for the Hall of Fame and had his jersey retired by the SuperSonics

== A ==
Player	Nationality	Jersey Number(s)	Position	Years	From
Zaid Abdul-Aziz	United States	35	C / PF	1970–1972; 1975–1976	Iowa State
Henry Akin	United States	10	C / PF	1967–1968	Morehead State
Lucius Allen	United States	42	PG	1969–1970	UCLA
* Ray Allen	United States	34	SG	2003–2007	Connecticut
Kenny Anderson	United States	17	PG	2002–2003	Georgia Tech
Greg Anthony	United States	2	PG	1997–1998	UNLV
Vincent Askew	United States	17, 2	SG / SF	1992–1996	Memphis
Dennis Awtrey	United States	21	C	1978–1979; 1980–1981	Santa Clara

== B ==
Player	Nationality	Jersey Number(s)	Position	Years	From
James Bailey	United States	20	PF / center	1979–1981	Rutgers
Vin Baker	United States	42	PF	1997–2002	Hartford
Greg Ballard	United States	42	PF	1988–1989	Oregon
Mike Bantom	United States	40	PF / C	1975–1977	Saint Joseph's
Norton Barnhill	United States	10	G	1976–1977	Washington State
Dana Barros	United States	3, 11	PG	1989–1993	Boston College
Brent Barry	United States	31	SG	1999–2004	Oregon State
Drew Barry	United States	12	SG	1999	Georgia Tech
Butch Beard	United States	21	SG	1972–1973	Louisville
Benoit Benjamin	United States	00	C	1990–1993	Creighton
Tom Black	United States	12	C	1970–1971	South Dakota State
Cory Blackwell	United States	30	SF	1984–1985	Wisconsin
Calvin Booth	United States	52	C	2001–2004	Penn State
Bob Boozer	United States	20	PF	1969–1970	Kansas State
Lazaro Borrell	Cuba	11	PF	1999–2000	
Charles Bradley	United States	30	SG	1983	Wyoming
Frank Brickowski	United States	33, 34	PF / C	1984–1986; 1995–1996	Penn State
John Brisker	United States	40, 42	SF-SG	1972–1975	Toledo
^ Fred Brown	United States	32	PG / SG	1971–1984	Iowa
Tony Brown	United States	21	SF-SG	1992	Arkansas
Rick Brunson	United States	5	PG	2005–2006	Temple
Tommy Burleson	United States	16	C	1974–1977	North Carolina State

== C ==
Player	Nationality	Jersey Number(s)	Position	Years	From
Michael Cage	United States	44	C / PF	1988–1994	San Diego Aztecs
Elden Campbell	United States	41	C	2003	Clemson
Al Carlson	United States	35	C	1975–1976	Oregon
Bill Cartwright	United States	24	C	1994–1995	San Francisco
Tom Chambers	United States	24	C / PF	1983–1988	Utah
Mike Champion	United States	41	PF	1988–1989	Gonzaga
Archie Clark	United States	21	PG	1974–1975	Minnesota
Mateen Cleaves	United States	24	PG	2004–2006	Michigan State
Barry Clemens	United States	43	PF	1969–1972	Ohio Wesleyan
Nick Collison	United States	4	PF	2004–2008	Kansas
Marty Conlon	Ireland	24	PF / C	1991–1992	Providence
Joe Cooper	United States	53	PF / C	1985	Colorado
Dave Corzine	United States	42	C	1990–1991	DePaul
James Cotton	United States	4	SG	1997–1999	Long Beach State
Pete Cross	United States	41	PF / C	1970–1972; 1972–1973	San Francisco
John Crotty	United States	22	PG	1999	Virginia
Terry Cummings	United States	34	PF / C	1997	DePaul

== D ==
Player	Nationality	Jersey Number(s)	Position	Years	From
Quintin Dailey	United States	20	SG	1990–1991	San Francisco
Antonio Daniels	United States	33	PG	2003–2005	Bowling Green Falcons
Emanual Davis	United States	15	PG	1999–2001	Delaware State
Rod Derline	United States	25	G	1974–1976	Seattle
James Donaldson	United States; United Kingdom	40	C	1980–1983	Washington State
Jacky Dorsey	United States	34	F	1981	Georgia
Predrag Drobnjak	Montenegro	14	C	2001–2003	Efes Pilsen
Charles Dudley	United States	12	PG	1972–1973	Washington
Ronald Dupree	United States	12	SF	2008	Louisiana State
Kevin Durant	United States	35	SF	2007–2008	Texas

== E ==
Player	Nationality	Jersey Number(s)	Position	Years	From
Craig Ehlo	United States	3	SG	1996–1997	Washington State
Dale Ellis	United States	3	SG / SF	1986–1991; 1997–1999	Tennessee
Pervis Ellison	United States	29	C	2000	Louisville
Francisco Elson	Netherlands	16	C	2008	California
Reggie Evans	United States	34, 30	PF	2002–2006	Iowa
* Patrick Ewing	United States	33	Center	2000–2001	Georgetown

== F ==
Player	Nationality	Jersey Number(s)	Position	Years	From
Jim Farmer	United States	21	PG / SG	1990	Alabama
Noel Felix	United States	16	PF	2006	Fresno State
Al Fleming	United States	30	F	1978	Arizona
Alphonso Ford	United States	3	SG	1994	Mississippi Valley State
Jake Ford	United States	33	G	1970–1972	Maryland Eastern Shore
Sherell Ford	United States	1	SF	1995–1996	Illinois–Chicago
Joseph Forte	United States	40	SG	2002–2003	North Carolina
Danny Fortson	United States	21	PF	2004–2007	Cincinnati
Greg Foster	United States	44	PF / C	1999–2000	UTEP
Jim Fox	United States	31	PF / C	1972–1975	South Carolina

== G ==
Player	Nationality	Jersey Number(s)	Position	Years	From
Mickaël Gelabale	France	15	SF	2006–2008	Real Madrid
Dick Gibbs	United States	21	SF / SG	1973–1974	UTEP
Eddie Gill	United States	6	PG	2008	Weber State
Kendall Gill	United States	13	SG / SF	1993–1995	Illinois
Herm Gilliam	United States	3	G / SF	1975–1976	Purdue
Greg Graham	United States	21	SG	1996–1997	Indiana
Horace Grant	United States	54	PF / C	1999–2000	Clemson
Leonard Gray	United States	11	PF	1974–1976	Cal State-Long Beach
Jeff Green	United States	22	SF / PF	2007–2008	Georgetown
Mike Green	United States	23	C / PF	1976–1977	Louisiana Tech
John Greig	United States	22	F	1982–1983	Oregon
Adrian Griffin	United States	22	G / SF	2008	Seton Hall

== H ==
Player	Nationality	Jersey Number(s)	Position	Years	From
Al Hairston	United States	25	PG	1968–1969	Bowling Green State
Lars Hansen	Denmark; Canada	22	C	1978–1979	Washington
Bill Hanzlik	United States	22	SG / SF	1980–1982	Notre Dame
Art Harris	United States	12	G	1968–1969	Stanford
Antonio Harvey	United States	24, 4	Power forward / center	1996–1997; 2001	Pfeiffer
Joe Hassett	United States	10	SG	1977–1978	Providence
Steve Hawes	United States	10	C	1983–1984	Washington
Hersey Hawkins	United States	33	SG	1995–1998	Bradley
Steve Hayes	United States	41	C	1983–1984	Idaho State
+ Spencer Haywood	United States	24	PF / C	1970–1975	Detroit
Walt Hazzard	United States	42	PG	1968–1969; 1973–1974	UCLA
Gar Heard	United States	40	PF	1970–1972	Oklahoma
Gerald Henderson	United States	15	PG	1984–1986	VCU
Rod Higgins	United States	55	PF / C	1985	Fresno State
Armond Hill	United States	24	PG	1980–1982	Princeton
Byron Houston	United States	21	PF	1994–1995	Oklahoma State
Stephen Howard	United States	44	PF	1997–1998	DePaul
John Hummer	United States	14, 42	PF / C	1974–1976	Princeton

== J ==
Player	Nationality	Jersey Number(s)	Position	Years	From
Wardell Jackson	United States	30	SF	1974–1975	Ohio State
Jerome James	United States	33, 13	C	2002–2005	Florida A&M
Avery Johnson	United States	15	PG	1989–1990	Southern
Clay Johnson	United States	34	SG	1983–1984	Missouri
Clemon Johnson	United States	45	Center / PF	1987–1988	Florida A&M
* Dennis Johnson	United States	24	PG	1977–1980	Pepperdine
Eddie Johnson	United States	22, 8	SF	1991–1993	Illinois
Edward Johnson	United States	15	SG	1987	Auburn
Ervin Johnson	United States	50	C	1994–1996	New Orleans
John Johnson	United States	27	SF	1978–1982	Iowa
Steve Johnson	United States	33	PF / C	1990	Oregon State
Vinnie Johnson	United States	15	SG	1980–1981	Baylor

== K ==
Player	Nationality	Jersey Number(s)	Position	Years	From
Bob Kauffman	United States	22	PF / C	1968–1969	Guilford
Greg Kelser	United States	3	SF	1982–1982	Michigan State
Shawn Kemp	United States	40	PF	1990–1997	Trinity Valley Community College
Joe Kennedy	United States	34	SF	1969–1970	Duke
Jerome Kersey	United States	7	SF	1997–1998	Longwood
Chris King	United States	35	PF / SF	1997–1998	Wake Forest
Reggie King	United States	51	PF / SF	1983–1985	Alabama
Rich King	United States	25, 45	C	1991–1995	Nebraska
Curtis Kitchen	United States	42	PF	1986	South Florida
Bart Kofoed	United States	23	PG	1991–1992	Nebraska–Kearney
Don Kojis	United States	44, 22	SF	1970–1972	Marquette
Tommy Kron	United States	11	SG	1967–1969	Kentucky
İbrahim Kutluay	Turkey	11	SG	2004–2005	Ülkerspor

== L ==
Player	Nationality	Jersey Number(s)	Position	Years	From
Tom LaGarde	United States	23	C / PF	1978–1980	North Carolina
Rashard Lewis	United States	7	SF / PF	1998–2007	Alief Elsik HS
Alton Lister	United States	53	PF / C	1986–1989	Arizona State
Randy Livingston	United States	9, 14	PG	2002; 2007	Louisiana State
Art Long	United States	35	PF	2001–2002	Cincinnati
Plummer Lott	United States	43	SF / SG	1967–1969	Seattle
Bob Love	United States	10	SF	1977	Southern A&M
John Lucas	United States	20	PG	1988–1989	Maryland
Maurice Lucas	United States	20	PF	1986–1987	Marquette

== M ==
Player	Nationality	Jersey Number(s)	Position	Years	From
Don MacLean	United States	24	PF	1999	UCLA
* Šarūnas Marčiulionis	Lithuania	30	SG	1994–1995	
Donyell Marshall	United States	42	PF	2008	Connecticut
Vester Marshall	United States	45	F	1973–1974	Oklahoma
Brian Martin	United States	35	PF	1985	Kansas
Desmond Mason	United States	24	SG / SF	2000–2003	Oklahoma State
Vernon Maxwell	United States	3	SG	1999–2000	Florida
Tim McCormick	United States	40	C	1984–1986	Michigan
Jelani McCoy	United States	34	C	1998–2001	UCLA
Scooter McCray	United States	21	SG / SF	1983–1984	Louisville
Xavier McDaniel	United States	34	SF	1985–1990	Wichita State
Jim McDaniels	United States	44	PF / C	1972–1973	Western Kentucky
Jim McIlvaine	United States	22	C	1996–1998	Marquette
Kennedy McIntosh	United States	40, 43	PF	1972–1974	Eastern Michigan
Derrick McKey	United States	31	SF	1987–1993	Alabama
^ Nate McMillan	United States	10	SF / SF	1986–1998	North Carolina State
Scott Meents	United States	50, 8	PF	1989–1991	Illinois
Tom Meschery	United States; Manchukuo	14	PF	1967–1971	Saint Mary's College
Mikki Moore	United States	33	PF / center	2005–2006	Nebraska
Erwin Mueller	United States	24	PF / center	1969 (2 seasons)	San Francisco
Ronald Murray	United States	15, 22	PG / SG	2003–2006	Shaw
Dorie Murrey	United States	41	PF / center	1967–1970	Detroit

== N ==
Player	Nationality	Jersey Number(s)	Position	Years	From
Ira Newble	United States	14	SF / PF	2008	Miami (Ohio)
Moochie Norris	United States	6	PG	1999	West Florida
Willie Norwood	United States	15	PF	1975–1977	Alcorn State

== O ==
Player	Nationality	Jersey Number(s)	Position	Years	From
Frank Oleynick	United States	44	PG	1975–1977	Seattle
Kevin Ollie	United States	8	PG	2003	Connecticut
Bud Olsen	United States	24	PF / C	1967–1968	Louisville
Billy Owens	United States	30	SF / SG	1999	Syracuse
Olumide Oyedeji	Nigeria	00	C	2000–2002	DJK Würzburg

== P ==
Player	Nationality	Jersey Number(s)	Position	Years	From
Gerald Paddio	United States	21	SF / SG	1992–1993	UNLV
Ruben Patterson	United States	21	SF	1999–2001	Cincinnati
* Gary Payton	United States	2, 20	Guard	1990–2003	Oregon State
Sam Perkins	United States	14	C	1993–1998	North Carolina
Chuck Person	United States	45	SF	1999–2000	Auburn
Johan Petro	France	27	C	2005–2007	Pau-Orthez
Mike Phelps	United States	25	SG	1986–1987	Alcorn State
Ricky Pierce	United States	21, 22	SG / SF	1991–1994	Rice
Olden Polynice	Haiti	23, 0	C	1988–1991; 1999	Virginia
David Pope	United States	51	F	1986	Norfolk State
Vitaly Potapenko	Ukraine	9	C	2003–2006	Wright State

== R ==
Player	Nationality	Jersey Number(s)	Position	Years	From
Mark Radford	United States	30	PG / SG	1981–1983	Oregon State
Vladimir Radmanović	Serbia	77	SF / PF	2001–2006	KK FMP
Jerry Reynolds	United States	35	SG / SF	1988–1989	Louisiana State
Luke Ridnour	United States	8	PG	2003–2008	Oregon
Jackie Robinson	United States	22	SF	1979	UNLV
Bob Rule	United States	45	PF / C	1967–1971	Colorado State

== S ==
Player	Nationality	Jersey Number(s)	Position	Years	From
Steve Scheffler	United States	55	C / PF	1992–1997	Purdue
Russ Schoene	United States	40	PF	1986–1989	UTC
Detlef Schrempf	Germany	11	SF / PF	1993–1999	Washington
John Schweitz	United States	35	SG	1984–1985	Richmond
Bruce Seals	United States	45	PF	1975–1978	Xavier (Louisiana)
Brad Sellers	United States	2	PF / C	1989–1990	Ohio State
Mouhamed Sene	Senegal	18	C	2006–2008	RBC Verviers-Pepinster
Ansu Sesay	United States	45, 5	PF	2002–2004	Mississippi
Lonnie Shelton	United States	8	PF / C	1978–1982	Oregon State
Gene Short	United States	20	SF	1975	Jackson State
John Shumate	United States	34	PF / C	1980	Notre Dame
+ Jack Sikma	United States	43	PF / C	1977–1986	Illinois Wesleyan
Paul Silas	United States	35, 36	PF / SF	1977–1980	Creighton
Talvin Skinner	United States	22	SF / SG	1974–1976	Maryland Eastern Shore
Leon Smith	United States	35	PF	2004	King College Prep HS
Phil Smith	United States	20	SG	1982–1983	San Francisco
Eric Snow	United States	3, 13	PG	1995–1998	Michigan State
Dick Snyder	United States	10, 11	SF/ SG	1969–1974; 1978–1979	Davidson
Ricky Sobers	United States	14	PG	1984–1986	UNLV
Elmore Spencer	United States	27	C	1996	UNLV
Isaac Stallworth	United States	15	SF / SG	1972–1974	Kansas
Terence Stansbury	United States	44	SG	1986–1987	Temple
Vladimir Stepania	Georgia	5	Center	1999–2000	KK Union Olimpija
Larry Stewart	United States	23	SF	1996–1997	Coppin State
Alex Stivrins	United States	42	PF	1985	Colorado
Jon Sundvold	United States	20	SG	1984–1985	Missouri
Robert Swift	United States	31	C	2005–2008	Bakersfield HS
Wally Szczerbiak	United States	3	SF / SG	2007–2008	Miami (Ohio)

== T ==
Player	Nationality	Jersey Number(s)	Position	Years	From
Kurt Thomas	United States	44	PF / C	2007–2008	Texas Christian
* David Thompson	United States	44	SF / SG	1982–1984	North Carolina State
Rod Thorn	United States	44	SG	1967–1971	West Virginia
Sedale Threatt	United States	4	PG	1988–1991	West Virginia Tech
Ray Tolbert	United States	33	PF	1981–1983	Indiana Hoosiers
Dean Tolson	United States	20	PF	1974–1975; 1976–1977	Arkansas
John Tresvant	United States	30	PF / C	1969–1970	Seattle
Al Tucker	United States	33	SF	1968–1969	Oklahoma Baptist

== V ==
Player	Nationality	Jersey Number(s)	Position	Years	From
Sam Vincent	United States	11	PG	1987–1988	Michigan State
Fred Vinson	United States	24	SG	1999–2000	Georgia Tech
Danny Vranes	United States	23	PF	1982–1986	Utah

== W ==
Player	Nationality	Jersey Number(s)	Position	Years	From
Wally Walker	United States	42	SF	1977–1982	Virginia
Earl Watson	United States	25	PG	2002; 2006–2008	UCLA
Slick Watts	United States	13	PG	1973–1978	Xavier (Louisiana)
Nick Weatherspoon	United States	12	SF	1976–1977	Illinois
Marvin Webster	United States	40	C	1977–1978	Morgan State
Bob Weiss	United States	12	PG	1967–1968	Pennsylvania State
Paul Westphal	United States	44	SG	1980–1981	USC
Delonte West	United States	2	SG / PG	2007–2008	Saint Joseph's
Rudy White	United States	10	SG	1980–1981	Arizona State
Chris Wilcox	United States	54	PF / C	2006–2008	Maryland
+ Lenny Wilkens	United States	19	PG	1969–1972	Providence
Bob Wilkerson	United States	33	SF / SG	1976–1977	Indiana
Damien Wilkins	United States	12, 21	SF / SG	2004–2008	Georgia
Mike Wilks	United States	29	PG	2006–2007; 2008	Rice
Aaron Williams	United States	15	PF / C	1997–1999	Xavier
^ Gus Williams	United States	1	PG	1977–1984	USC
Kevin Williams	United States	30	PG	1986–1988	St. John's
Milt Williams	United States	12	SG	1973–1974	St. John's
Shammond Williams	United States	1	PG / SG	1999–2002	North Carolina
George Wilson	United States	15	C	1967–1968	Cincinnati
Lee Winfield	United States	11	PG	1969–1973	North Texas
David Wingate	United States	25	SG / SF	1995–1998	Georgetown
Dontonio Wingfield	United States	34	SF / PF	1994–1995	Cincinnati
Willie Wise	United States	42	SF	1977	Drake
Rubén Wolkowyski	Argentina	45	C	2000–2001	Estudiantes de Olavarría
Al Wood	United States	4	SF / SG	1983–1986	North Carolina
Joby Wright	United States	14, 20	SF / SG	1972–1973	Indiana

== Y ==
Player	Nationality	Jersey Number(s)	Position	Years	From
Danny Young	United States	22	PG	1984–1988	Wake Forest

== Z ==
Player	Nationality	Jersey Number(s)	Position	Years	From
George Zidek	Czech Republic	52	C	1998	UCLA

== Coaches ==
Name	Nationality	Years	Win–loss record	Best Finish
Al Bianchi	United States	1967–1969	53–111 (.323)	5th Place in Western Division
Lenny Wilkens	United States	1969–1972; 1977–1985	478–402 (.543)	NBA Champions
Tom Nissalke	United States	1972–1973	13–32 (.289)	4th place in Pacific Division
Bucky Buckwalter	United States	1973	13–24 (.341)	4th place in Pacific Division
Bill Russell	United States	1973–1977	162–166 (.494)	West Semifinals (1975, 1976)
Bob Hopkins	United States	1977	5–17 (.227)	
Bernie Bickerstaff	United States	1985–1990	202–208 (.493)	West Finals (1987)
K. C. Jones	United States	1990–1992	59–59 (.500)	West Semifinals (1992)
Bob Kloppenburg	United States	1992	2–2 (.500)	West Semifinals (1992)
George Karl	United States	1992–1998	384–150 (.719)	NBA Finals (1996)
Paul Westphal	United States	1998–2000	76–71 (.517)	West First Round (2000)
Nate McMillan	United States	2000–2005	212–183 (.537)	West Semifinals (2005)
Bob Weiss	United States	2005–2006	13–17 (.433)	3rd place in Northwest Division
Bob Hill	United States	2006–2007	53–81 (.396)	3rd place in Northwest Division
P. J. Carlesimo	United States	2008	20–62 (.244)	5th place in Northwest Division
