= Mark Gorenberg =

American venture capitalist

Mark P. Gorenberg
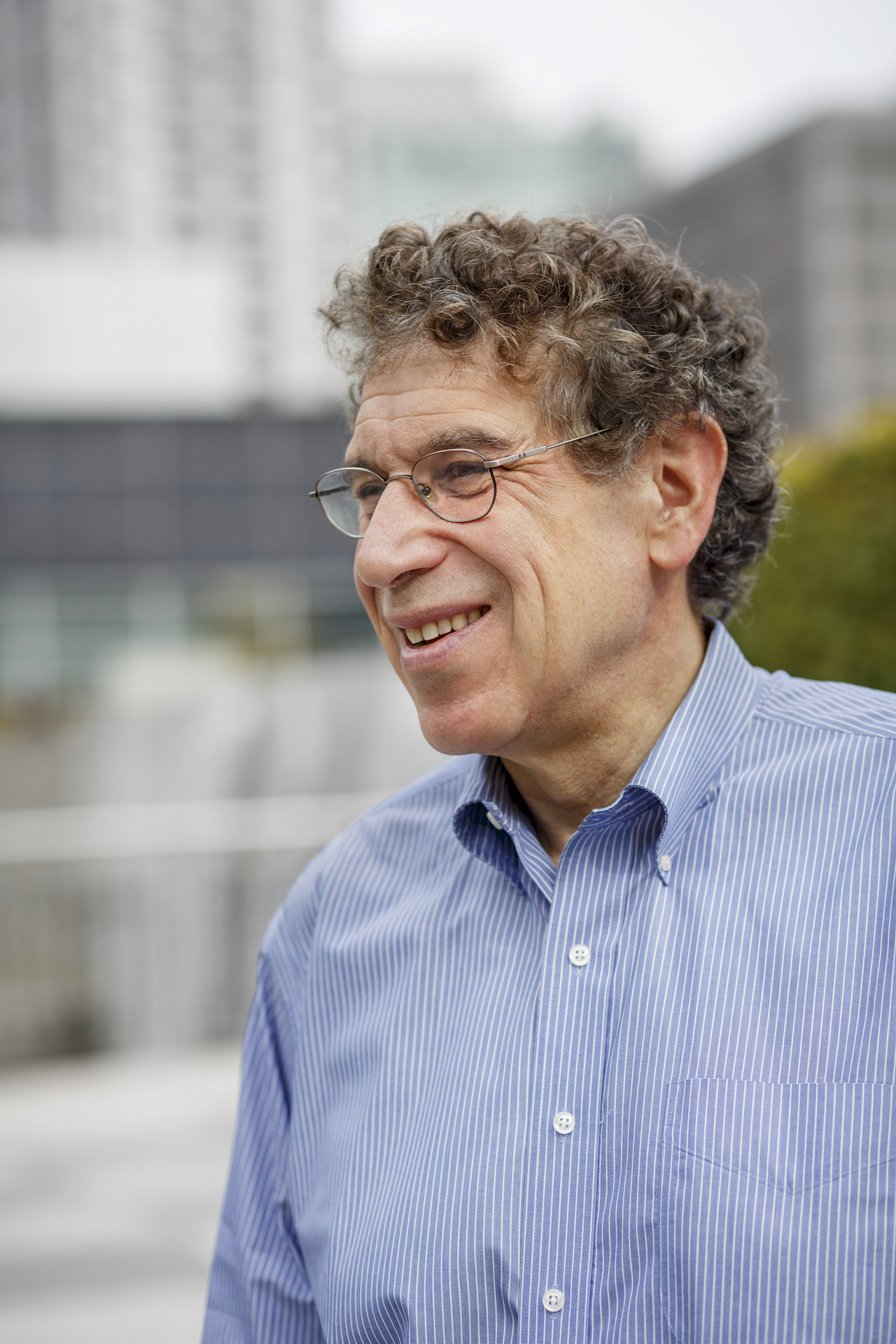
- Occupation: venture capitalist

Mark P. Gorenberg (born 1955) is an American venture capitalist, currently a managing director of San Francisco-based Zetta Venture Partners, the first early-stage venture capital dedicated to investing in Artificial Intelligence. He also serves as the Chair of the MIT Corporation, the board of trustees of the Massachusetts Institute of Technology.

== Education ==
Gorenberg received a B.S. from MIT (1976), an M.S. in electrical engineering from the University of Minnesota (1979), and an M.S. in engineering management from Stanford University (1984).

== Career ==
Gorenberg was a member of the original SPARCstation 1 team at Sun Microsystems.

He joined software venture capital firm Hummer Winblad in 1990, soon after its founding by John Hummer and Ann Winblad and when it was investing its first fund. He served on the board of Hummer Winblad companies such as Omniture, AdForce, NetDynamics, and Scopus Technologies.

After 20 years at Hummer Winblad, Gorenberg raised $30 million to start his own venture capital firm Zetta Venture partners.

At Zetta Venture Partners, he led investments in Domo, DominoDataLab and many others.

He has also served on several other non-profit boards, including the H. John Heinz III Center for Science, Economics and The Environment.

=== MIT ===
Gorenberg joined the MIT Corporation, the institute's board of trustees, in 2001 and became its chair on July 1, 2023. He previously served on the MIT Investment Committee (MITIMCo), Executive Committee, Development Committee, and search committee that hired Sally Kornbluth in 2022. He is also on the steering committee of the Martin Trust Center for MIT Entrepreneurship.

After the 2023 United States Congress hearings on antisemitism led to the resignation of University of Pennsylvania President Liz Magill, Gorenberg wrote in an open letter that he and the MIT Corporation "entirely support President Kornbluth".

== Politics ==
Gorenberg is a long-time fund-raiser and operative for the Democratic Party. He was a key member of the 2000 presidential campaign of Bill Bradley, and was a key operative and major fund-raiser for the John Kerry during the 2004 Democratic Party presidential primaries, joining the campaign in January 2002.

Gorenberg oversaw California fund-raising for Senator John F. Kerry's 2004 presidential campaign. He was a member of then-candidate Obama's national finance committee in the 2008 Presidential campaign.

In 2011, President Obama appointed Gorenberg to the President's Council of Advisors on Science and Technology (PCAST).

Gorenberg was a member of the FCC's Technology Advisory Council.
