= Siltanen =

Siltanen is a Finnish surname. Notable people with the surname include:

- Risto Siltanen (born 1958), Finnish ice hockey player
- Sylvi Siltanen (1909–1986), Finnish accountant and politician

== See also ==
- Siltanen & Partners, an American advertising agency
