= Oklahoma City Thunder all-time roster =

The following is a list of players, both past and current, who played in at least in one game for Oklahoma City Thunder (2008–present) National Basketball Association (NBA) franchise. For players who played at least one game before relocation and rebranding see Seattle SuperSonics all-time roster (1967–2008).

== Players ==
Note: Statistics are correct through the end of the 2025–26 season.

G	Guard	G/F	Guard-forward	F	Forward	F/C	Forward-center	C	Center

legend
^	Denotes player who has been inducted to the Naismith Memorial Basketball Hall of Fame
*	Denotes player who has been selected for at least one All-Star Game with the Oklahoma City Thunder and is currently on the team roster
^{+}	Denotes player who has been selected for at least one All-Star Game with the Oklahoma City Thunder
^{x}	Denotes player who is currently on the Oklahoma City Thunder roster
0.0	Denotes the Oklahoma City Thunder statistics leader (min. 100 games played for the team for per-game statistics)

=== A to B ===
All-time roster
Player	Pos.	Pre-draft team	Yrs	Seasons	Statistics									Ref.
Player	Pos.	Pre-draft team	Yrs	Seasons	GP	MP	REB	AST	PTS	MPG	RPG	APG	PPG	Ref.
Álex Abrines	G/F	(Spain) FC Barcelona	3	2016–2019	174	2,777	248	88	924	16.0	1.4	0.5	5.3	
Steven Adams	C	Pittsburgh	7	2013–2020	530	14,207	4,029	615	5,191	26.8	7.6	1.2	9.8	
Cole Aldrich	C	Kansas	2	2010–2012	44	315	83	7	75	7.2	1.9	0.2	1.7	
Antonio Anderson	G	Memphis	1	2009–2010	1	15	1	0	2	15.0	1.0	0.0	2.0	
Carmelo Anthony^	F	Syracuse	1	2017–2018	78	2,501	453	103	1,261	32.1	5.8	1.3	16.2	
Chucky Atkins	G	South Florida	1	2008–2009	19	297	18	31	71	15.6	0.9	1.6	3.7	
D. J. Augustin	G	Texas	2	2014–2016	62	1,196	104	154	345	19.3	1.7	2.5	5.6	
Brooks Barnhizer^{x}	G/F	Northwestern	1	2025–2026	40	348	78	22	68	8.7	2.0	0.6	1.7	
Darius Bazley	F/C	Princeton (OH)	4	2019–2023	221	5,323	1,200	269	2,037	24.1	5.4	1.2	9.2	
Dāvis Bertāns	F	(Slovenia) Olimpija Ljubljana	1	2023–2024	15	91	10	9	44	6.1	0.7	0.6	2.9	
Bismack Biyombo	C	(Spain) Baloncesto Fuenlabrada	1	2023–2024	10	73	18	2	18	7.3	1.8	0.2	1.8	
Buddy Boeheim	F	Syracuse	1	2025–2026	4	15	0	0	6	3.8	0.0	0.0	1.5	
Ryan Bowen	F	Iowa	1	2009–2010	1	8	2	0	4	8.0	2.0	0.0	4.0	
Tony Bradley	C	North Carolina	1	2020–2021	22	397	135	20	191	18.0	6.1	0.9	8.7	
Corey Brewer	G/F	Florida	1	2017–2018	18	514	61	24	182	28.6	3.4	1.3	10.1	
Ronnie Brewer	G/F	Arkansas	1	2012–2013	14	142	40	10	13	10.1	2.9	0.7	0.9	
Charlie Brown Jr.	G	Saint Joseph's	1	2020–2021	9	152	17	9	40	16.9	1.9	1.0	4.4	
Moses Brown	C	UCLA	1	2020–2021	43	920	383	10	370	21.4	8.9	0.2	8.6	
Deonte Burton	G	Iowa State	2	2018–2020	71	596	85	26	186	8.4	1.2	0.4	2.6	
Caron Butler	F	UConn	1	2013–2014	22	598	71	26	213	27.2	3.2	1.2	9.7	
Jared Butler	G	Baylor	1	2022–2023	6	77	4	8	37	12.8	0.7	1.3	6.2	

=== C to E ===
All-time roster
Player	Pos.	Pre-draft team	Yrs	Seasons	Statistics									Ref.
Player	Pos.	Pre-draft team	Yrs	Seasons	GP	MP	REB	AST	PTS	MPG	RPG	APG	PPG	Ref.
Branden Carlson^{x}	C	Utah	2	2024–2026	74	734	178	43	364	9.9	2.4	0.6	4.9	
Alex Caruso^{x}	G	Texas A&M	2	2024–2026	110	2,061	314	247	730	18.7	2.9	2.2	6.6	
Semaj Christon	G	Xavier	1	2016–2017	64	973	87	130	183	15.2	1.4	2.0	2.9	
Norris Cole	G	Cleveland State	1	2016–2017	13	125	11	14	43	9.6	0.8	1.1	3.3	
Nick Collison (#4)	F	Kansas	14	2004–2018	910	18,603	4,701	939	5,359	20.4	5.2	1.0	5.9	
Daequan Cook	G	Ohio State	2	2010–2012	100	1,587	194	35	550	15.9	1.9	0.4	5.5	
Tyler Davis	C	Texas A&M	1	2018–2019	1	1	1	0	0	1.0	1.0	0.0	0.0	
Gabriel Deck	F	(Argentina) San Lorenzo	2	2020–2022	17	268	46	29	102	15.8	2.7	1.7	6.0	
Mamadi Diakite	F	Virginia	1	2021–2022	13	188	59	2	56	14.5	4.5	1.7	4.3	
Hamidou Diallo	G	Kentucky	3	2018–2021	129	2,183	429	130	889	16.9	3.3	1.0	6.9	
Ousmane Dieng	F/C	New Zealand Breakers	4	2022–2026	136	1,634	279	142	568	12.0	2.1	1.0	4.2	
Luguentz Dort^{x}	G/F	Arizona State	7	2019–2026	432	12,468	1,648	670	5,018	28.9	3.8	1.6	11.6	
PJ Dozier	G	South Carolina	1	2017–2018	2	3	1	0	2	1.5	0.5	0.0	1.0	
Alex Ducas	G	Saint Mary's	1	2024–2025	21	125	26	5	36	6.0	1.2	0.2	1.7	
Kevin Durant^{+}	F	Texas	9	2007–2016	641	24,208	4,518	2,363	17,566	37.8	7.0	3.7	27.4	
Rob Edwards	G	Arizona State	1	2021–2022	2	11	3	0	3	5.5	1.5	0.0	1.5	
Jawun Evans	G	Oklahoma State	1	2018–2019	1	1	0	0	0	1.0	0.0	0.0	0.0	

=== F to G ===
All-time roster
Player	Pos.	Pre-draft team	Yrs	Seasons	Statistics									Ref.
Player	Pos.	Pre-draft team	Yrs	Seasons	GP	MP	REB	AST	PTS	MPG	RPG	APG	PPG	Ref.
Derrick Favors	F/C	Georgia Tech	1	2021–2022	39	653	184	25	206	16.7	4.7	0.6	5.3	
Raymond Felton	G	North Carolina	2	2017–2019	115	1,744	190	255	707	15.2	1.7	2.2	6.1	
Terrance Ferguson	G/F	Prime Prep Academy (TX)	3	2017–2020	191	3,951	262	142	922	20.7	1.4	0.7	4.8	
Derek Fisher	G	Little Rock	3	2011–2014	125	2,181	173	161	621	17.4	1.4	1.3	5.0	
Adam Flagler	G	Baylor	2	2023–2025	39	217	27	16	68	5.6	0.7	0.4	1.7	
Randy Foye	G	Villanova	1	2015–2016	27	572	51	49	151	21.2	1.9	1.8	5.6	
Melvin Frazier	G/F	Tulane	1	2021–2022	3	120	13	1	32	40.0	4.7	0.3	10.7	
Enes Freedom	C	Stoneridge Prep (CA)	3	2014–2017	180	4,063	1,433	129	2,556	22.6	8.0	0.7	14.2	
Danilo Gallinari	F	(Italy) Olimpia Milano	1	2019–2020	62	1,834	322	119	1,160	29.6	5.2	1.9	18.7	
Paul George^{+}	F	Fresno State	2	2017–2019	156	5,732	1,075	581	3,893	36.7	6.9	3.7	25.0	
Taj Gibson	F	USC	1	2016–2017	23	487	103	13	207	21.2	4.5	0.6	9.0	
Josh Giddey	G	(Australia) Adelaide 36ers	3	2021–2024	210	6,078	1,534	1,200	2,920	28.9	7.3	5.7	13.9	
Shai Gilgeous-Alexander*	G	Kentucky	7	2019–2026	448	15,376	2,271	2,540	12,522	34.3	5.1	5.7	28.0	
Ryan Gomes	F	Providence	1	2013–2014	5	34	4	1	6	6.8	0.8	0.2	1.2	
Jerami Grant	F	Syracuse	3	2016–2019	239	5,749	935	182	2,193	24.1	3.9	0.8	9.2	
Donte Grantham	F	Clemson	1	2018–2019	3	2	0	0	0	0.7	0.0	0.0	0.0	
Jeff Green	F	Georgetown	4	2007–2011	289	9,984	1,662	497	4,111	34.5	5.8	1.7	14.2	

=== H ===
All-time roster
Player	Pos.	Pre-draft team	Yrs	Seasons	Statistics									Ref.
Player	Pos.	Pre-draft team	Yrs	Seasons	GP	MP	REB	AST	PTS	MPG	RPG	APG	PPG	Ref.
Devon Hall	G	Virginia	1	2019–2020	11	81	7	13	20	7.4	0.6	1.2	1.8	
Josh Hall	F	Moravian Prep (NC)	1	2020–2021	21	336	59	28	86	16.0	2.8	1.3	4.1	
Daniel Hamilton	G/F	UConn	1	2017–2018	6	28	5	8	12	4.7	0.8	1.3	2.0	
James Harden	G	Arizona State	3	2009–2012	220	5,873	751	542	2,795	26.7	3.4	2.5	12.7	
Isaiah Hartenstein^{x}	C	(Lithuania) Žalgiris Kaunas	2	2024–2026	104	2,727	1,054	385	1,069	26.2	10.1	3.7	10.3	
Antonio Harvey	F/C	Pfeiffer	2	1996–1997; 2001–2002	11	73	19	6	24	6.6	1.7	0.5	2.2	
Gordon Hayward	F	Butler	1	2023–2024	26	447	64	42	138	17.2	2.5	1.6	5.3	
Lazar Hayward	F	Marquette	1	2011–2012	26	141	16	4	37	5.4	0.6	0.2	1.4	
Kevin Hervey	F	UT Arlington	1	2019–2020	10	52	12	5	17	5.2	1.2	0.5	1.7	
George Hill	G	IUPUI	1	2020–2021	14	369	29	43	165	26.4	2.1	3.1	11.8	
Steven Hill	C	Arkansas	1	2008–2009	1	2	3	0	2	2.0	3.0	0.0	2.0	
Jaylen Hoard	F	Wake Forest	2	2020–2022	26	560	149	41	219	21.5	5.7	1.6	8.4	
Chet Holmgren*	F/C	Gonzaga	3	2023–2026	187	5,287	1,520	378	3,017	28.9	8.3	2.1	16.5	
Scotty Hopson	G/F	Tennessee	1	2021–2022	1	18	1	1	4	18.0	1.0	1.0	4.0	
Al Horford	F/C	Florida	1	2020–2021	28	782	188	94	398	27.9	6.7	3.4	14.2	
Josh Huestis	F	Stanford	3	2015–2018	76	1,068	180	23	187	14.1	2.4	0.3	2.5	

=== I to L ===
All-time roster
Player	Pos.	Pre-draft team	Yrs	Seasons	Statistics									Ref.
Player	Pos.	Pre-draft team	Yrs	Seasons	GP	MP	REB	AST	PTS	MPG	RPG	APG	PPG	Ref.
Serge Ibaka	F/C	(Spain) L'Hospitalet	7	2009–2016	524	15,099	3,875	309	6,054	28.8	7.4	0.6	11.6	
Ersan İlyasova	F	(Turkey) Ülkerspor	1	2016–2017	3	62	16	1	15	20.7	5.3	0.3	5.0	
Royal Ivey	G	Texas	3	2010–2012; 2013–2014	61	514	41	17	112	8.4	0.7	0.3	1.8	
Justin Jackson	F	North Carolina	1	2020–2021	33	544	71	51	236	16.5	2.2	1.5	7.2	
Reggie Jackson	G	Boston College	4	2011–2015	245	5,169	733	738	2,202	21.1	3.0	3.0	9.0	
Ty Jerome	G	Virginia	2	2020–2022	81	1,589	169	229	693	19.6	2.1	2.8	8.6	
Grant Jerrett	F	Arizona	1	2014–2015	5	25	4	1	7	5.0	0.8	0.2	1.4	
Isaiah Joe^{x}	G	Arkansas	4	2022–2026	296	5,951	732	400	2,868	20.1	2.5	1.4	9.7	
Dakari Johnson	C	Kentucky	1	2017–2018	31	161	34	8	55	5.2	1.1	0.3	1.8	
Keyontae Johnson	F	Kansas State	1	2023–2024	9	66	10	4	11	7.3	1.1	0.4	1.2	
Dillon Jones	F	Weber State	1	2024–2025	54	551	121	58	135	10.2	2.2	1.1	2.5	
Perry Jones	F	Baylor	3	2012–2015	143	1,675	252	54	488	11.7	1.8	0.4	3.4	
Georgios Kalaitzakis	F	(Greece) Panathinaikos	1	2021–2022	4	166	13	12	70	41.5	3.3	3.0	17.5	
Vít Krejčí	G	(Spain) Zaragoza	1	2021–2022	30	690	101	57	187	23.0	3.4	1.9	6.2	
Nenad Krstić	C	(Federal Republic of Yugoslavia) Partizan	3	2008–2011	169	3,900	843	100	1,441	23.1	5.0	0.6	8.5	
Jeremy Lamb	G/F	UConn	3	2012–2015	148	2,318	314	164	1,031	15.7	2.1	1.1	7.0	
Joffrey Lauvergne	F/C	(Serbia) Partizan	1	2016–2017	50	739	183	51	286	14.8	3.7	1.0	5.7	
Malevy Leons	F	Bradley	1	2024–2025	6	21	3	1	2	3.5	0.5	0.2	0.3	
DeAndre Liggins	G	Kentucky	1	2012–2013	39	290	53	15	58	7.4	1.4	0.4	1.5	
Shaun Livingston	G	Peoria HS (IL)	2	2008–2010	18	320	46	30	72	17.8	2.6	1.7	4.0	
Timothé Luwawu-Cabarrot	F	(Serbia) Mega Leks	1	2018–2019	21	123	18	4	35	5.9	0.9	0.2	1.7	

=== M to P ===
All-time roster
Player	Pos.	Pre-draft team	Yrs	Seasons	Statistics									Ref.
Player	Pos.	Pre-draft team	Yrs	Seasons	GP	MP	REB	AST	PTS	MPG	RPG	APG	PPG	Ref.
Théo Maledon	G	(France) ASVEL	2	2020–2022	116	2,686	342	338	1,019	23.2	2.9	2.9	8.8	
Tre Mann	G	Florida	3	2021–2024	140	2,669	350	231	1,191	19.1	2.5	1.7	8.5	
Kevin Martin	G	Western Carolina	1	2012–2013	77	2,136	178	106	1,077	27.7	2.3	1.4	14.0	
Eric Maynor	G	VCU	4	2009–2013	183	2,634	243	518	738	14.4	1.3	2.8	4.0	
Jared McCain^{x}	G	Duke	1	2025–2026	30	540	62	28	313	18.0	2.1	0.9	10.4	
Doug McDermott	F	Creighton	1	2016–2017	22	430	49	13	145	19.5	2.2	0.6	6.6	
Mitch McGary	F/C	Michigan	2	2014–2016	52	557	183	17	227	10.7	3.5	0.3	4.4	
Vasilije Micić	G	(Serbia) Mega Vizura	1	2023–2024	30	361	24	76	99	12.0	0.8	2.5	3.3	
Darius Miller	F	Kentucky	1	2020–2021	18	197	24	21	73	10.9	1.3	1.2	4.1	
Ajay Mitchell^{x}	G	UC Santa Barbara	2	2024–2026	93	2,070	258	270	1,008	22.3	2.8	2.9	10.8	
Nazr Mohammed	C	Kentucky	3	2010–2012; 2015–2016	92	1,140	290	20	344	12.4	3.2	0.2	3.7	
Markieff Morris	F	Kansas	1	2018–2019	24	387	91	19	156	16.1	3.8	0.8	6.5	
Anthony Morrow	G	Georgia Tech	3	2014–2017	182	3,359	286	103	1,400	18.5	1.6	0.6	7.7	
Byron Mullens	C	Ohio State	2	2009–2011	26	139	34	1	39	5.3	1.3	0.0	1.5	
Mike Muscala	F/C	Bucknell	5	2019–2024	184	2,522	525	132	1,191	13.7	2.9	0.7	6.5	
Sviatoslav Mykhailiuk	G/F	Kansas	1	2020–2021	30	690	89	53	310	23.0	3.0	1.8	10.3	
Abdel Nader	F	Iowa State	2	2018–2020	116	1,561	216	58	586	13.5	1.9	0.5	5.1	
Nerlens Noel	F/C	Kentucky	2	2018–2020	138	2,182	625	102	827	15.8	4.5	0.7	6.0	
Steve Novak	F	Marquette	2	2014–2016	20	112	10	5	32	5.6	0.5	0.3	1.6	
Victor Oladipo	G	Indiana	1	2016–2017	67	2,222	291	176	1,067	33.2	4.3	2.6	15.9	
Kevin Ollie	G	UConn	2	2002–2003; 2009–2010	54	1,033	108	130	275	19.1	2.0	2.4	5.1	
Eugene Omoruyi	F	Oregon	1	2022–2023	23	272	52	11	113	11.8	2.3	0.5	4.9	
Daniel Orton	F/C	Kentucky	1	2012–2013	13	104	26	4	33	8.0	2.0	0.3	2.5	
Patrick Patterson	F	Kentucky	2	2017–2019	145	2,131	340	88	547	14.7	2.3	0.6	3.8	
Justin Patton	C	Creighton	1	2019–2020	5	24	5	2	9	4.8	1.0	0.4	1.8	
Chris Paul^{+}	G	Wake Forest	1	2019–2020	70	2,208	349	472	1,232	31.5	5.0	6.7	17.6	
Cameron Payne	G	Murray State	2	2015–2017	77	1,018	116	148	389	13.2	1.5	1.9	5.1	
Kendrick Perkins	C	Beaumont HS (TX)	5	2010–2015	273	6,315	1,611	315	1,159	23.1	5.9	1.2	4.2	
Morris Peterson	F	Michigan State	1	2010–2011	4	23	3	1	4	5.8	0.8	0.3	1.0	
Aleksej Pokuševski	F	(Greece) Olympiacos	4	2020–2024	150	3,084	699	297	1,119	20.6	4.7	2.0	7.5	

=== R to S ===
All-time roster
Player	Pos.	Pre-draft team	Yrs	Seasons	Statistics									Ref.
Player	Pos.	Pre-draft team	Yrs	Seasons	GP	MP	REB	AST	PTS	MPG	RPG	APG	PPG	Ref.
Alex Reese	F	Alabama	1	2024–2025	1	2	1	0	2	2.0	1.0	0.0	2.0	
Ryan Reid	F	Florida State	1	2011–2012	5	17	2	0	8	3.4	0.4	0.0	1.6	
André Roberson	G/F	Colorado	6	2013–2018; 2019–2020	302	6,738	1,215	261	1,376	22.3	4.0	0.9	4.6	
Justin Robinson	G	Virginia Tech	1	2020–2021	9	88	7	9	21	9.8	0.8	1.0	2.3	
Nate Robinson	G	Washington	1	2010–2011	4	30	1	6	13	7.5	0.3	1.5	3.3	
Jeremiah Robinson-Earl	F	Villanova	2	2021–2023	92	1,901	454	92	658	20.7	4.9	1.0	7.2	
Isaiah Roby	F	Nebraska	3	2019–2022	109	2,384	560	178	987	21.9	5.1	1.6	9.1	
Malik Rose	F	Drexel	1	2008–2009	20	310	65	26	100	15.5	3.3	1.3	5.0	
Domantas Sabonis	F/C	Gonzaga	1	2016–2017	81	1,632	288	82	479	20.1	3.6	1.0	5.9	
Payton Sandfort^{x}	F	Iowa	1	2025–2026	4	63	10	0	35	15.8	2.5	0.0	8.8	
Dario Šarić	F/C	(Croatia) Cibona	1	2022–2023	20	273	65	17	147	13.7	3.3	0.9	7.4	
Olivier Sarr	C	Kentucky	3	2021–2024	46	633	160	25	223	13.8	3.5	0.5	4.8	
Dennis Schröder	G	(Germany) Phantoms Braunschweig	2	2018–2020	144	4,313	520	585	2,453	30.0	3.6	4.1	17.0	
Thabo Sefolosha	G/F	(Italy) Angelico Biella	6	2008–2014	368	9,842	1,517	568	2,284	26.7	4.1	1.5	6.2	
Mustafa Shakur	G	Arizona	1	2013–2014	3	11	0	4	1	3.7	0.0	1.3	0.3	
Zavier Simpson	G	Michigan	1	2021–2022	4	174	21	30	44	43.5	5.3	7.5	11.0	
Kyle Singler	F	Duke	4	2014–2018	138	1,877	254	53	437	13.6	1.8	0.4	3.2	
Ish Smith	G	Wake Forest	1	2014–2015	30	155	27	28	37	5.2	0.9	0.9	1.2	
Joe Smith	F	Maryland	1	2008–2009	36	691	163	25	238	19.2	4.5	0.7	6.6	

=== T to Z ===
All-time roster
Player	Pos.	Pre-draft team	Yrs	Seasons	Statistics									Ref.
Player	Pos.	Pre-draft team	Yrs	Seasons	GP	MP	REB	AST	PTS	MPG	RPG	APG	PPG	Ref.
Sebastian Telfair	G	Abraham Lincoln HS (NY)	1	2014–2015	16	327	30	45	134	20.4	1.9	2.8	8.4	
Hasheem Thabeet	C	UConn	2	2012–2014	89	962	235	12	187	10.8	2.6	0.1	2.1	
Etan Thomas	F	Syracuse	1	2009–2010	23	321	64	1	75	14.0	2.8	0.0	3.3	
Lance Thomas	F	Duke	1	2014–2015	22	450	75	20	113	20.5	3.4	0.9	5.1	
Nikola Topić^{x}	G	(Serbia) KK Crvena zvezda	1	2025–2026	10	160	19	44	52	16.0	1.9	4.4	5.2	
Dion Waiters	G	Syracuse	2	2014–2016	125	3,574	337	243	1,357	28.6	2.7	1.9	10.9	
Cason Wallace^{x}	G	Kentucky	3	2023–2026	227	5,614	654	493	1,789	24.7	2.9	2.2	7.9	
Lindy Waters III	G	Oklahoma State	3	2021–2024	104	1,276	188	76	550	12.3	1.8	0.7	5.3	
Paul Watson	G/F	Fresno State	1	2021–2022	9	156	27	8	31	17.3	3.0	0.9	3.4	
Kyle Weaver	G	Washington State	2	2008–2010	68	1,310	148	112	335	19.3	2.2	1.6	4.9	
Russell Westbrook^{+}	G	UCLA	11	2008–2019	821	28,330	5,760	6,897	18,859	34.5	7.0	8.4	23.0	
D. J. White	F	Indiana	3	2008–2011	42	451	107	14	186	10.7	2.5	0.3	4.4	
Aaron Wiggins^{x}	G	Maryland	5	2021–2026	339	6,892	1,068	477	2,962	20.3	3.2	1.4	8.7	
Jalen Williams*	G/F	Santa Clara	4	2022–2026	248	7,672	1,140	1,105	4,464	30.9	4.6	4.5	18.0	
Jaylin Williams^{x}	F/C	Arkansas	4	2022–2026	230	3,872	1,095	464	1,311	16.8	4.8	2.0	5.7	
Kenrich Williams^{x}	F	TCU	6	2020–2026	362	6,720	1,391	634	2,438	18.6	3.8	1.8	6.7	
Reggie Williams	F	VMI	1	2013–2014	3	17	0	1	11	5.7	0.0	0.3	3.7	
Chris Youngblood	G	Alabama	1	2025–2026	32	174	28	11	65	5.4	0.9	0.3	2.0	
