= Jim Fox (basketball, born 1943) =

American basketball player

Personal information
- Born: April 7, 1943 (age 83) Atlanta, Georgia, U.S.
- Listed height: 6 ft 10 in (2.08 m)
- Listed weight: 230 lb (104 kg)

Career information
- High school: Gordon (Barnesville, Georgia)
- College: South Carolina (1963–1965)
- NBA draft: 1965: 8th round, 67th overall pick
- Drafted by: Cincinnati Royals
- Playing career: 1965–1977
- Position: Power forward / center
- Number: 23, 31, 41, 35, 40

Career history
- 1965–1966: Real Madrid
- 1966–1967: Racing Mechelen
- 1967–1968: Cincinnati Royals
- 1968: Detroit Pistons
- 1968–1970: Phoenix Suns
- 1970–1971: Chicago Bulls
- 1971–1972: Cincinnati Royals
- 1972–1975: Seattle SuperSonics
- 1975–1976: Milwaukee Bucks
- 1976–1977: New York Nets

Career NBA statistics
- Points: 6,945 (9.3 ppg)
- Rebounds: 5,525 (7.4 rpg)
- Assists: 1,201 (1.6 apg)
- Stats at NBA.com
- Stats at Basketball Reference

James L. Fox (born April 7, 1943) is an American former professional basketball player.

== College career ==
Fox was born in Atlanta and attended Gordon High School in Barnesville, Georgia. A 6'10" center, Fox played in junior college before enrolling his junior year at the University of South Carolina, playing in 13 games his junior season. He burst onto the scene his senior year, 1964–65, leading the Gamecocks in both scoring and rebounding. He averaged 17.8 points and 13.6 rebounds per game.

== Professional career ==
He was drafted in the eighth round of the 1965 NBA draft by the Cincinnati Royals, but he elected to play professionally in Europe for two seasons.

Fox joined the NBA's Royals for the 1967–68 season. In 31 games for the Royals, he averaged 3.2 points and 3.1 rebounds in eight minutes per game. Then, on February 1, 1968, he was part of a big trade which sent him and Happy Hairston to the Detroit Pistons for Tom Van Arsdale and John Tresvant. His playing time increased to over 15 minutes per game in 24 games for the Pistons, and he averaged 4.1 points and 5.6 rebounds per game.

The following season, 1968–69, Fox again was part of a midseason trade. In 25 games for the Pistons, he averaged 5.0 points and 5.6 rebounds per game before being traded on December 17, 1968, along with a third-round draft pick to the Phoenix Suns for McCoy McLemore. He found success with the Suns—he became a starter, averaging over 38 minutes per game and career-high 13.8 points and 13.3 rebounds along with 2.8 assists per game.

In 1969–70, he played the entire season for the Suns. Averaging 25 minutes per game in 81 games, he averaged 12.9 points and 7.0 rebounds per game with a career-best .524 field goal percentage.

Just after the completion of the 1969–70 season, on April 23, 1970, Fox was again traded, this time along with a second-round draft pick to the Chicago Bulls for Clem Haskins. For the 1970–21 season with the Bulls, Fox played in all 82 games, averaging 9.7 points, 7.3 rebounds and 2.4 assists per game.

In 1971–72, Fox played in 10 games for the Bulls before being traded again, this time along with a second-round draft pick back to the Cincinnati Royals for Norm Van Lier and a third-round pick. For the season, in 81 games, he averaged 11.5 points and 8.8 rebounds per game.

On October 9, 1972, Fox was on the move yet again. The Kansas City-Omaha Kings (formerly the Cincinnati Royals) traded him along with Dick Gibbs to the Seattle SuperSonics for a second-round pick. In the 1972–73 season, he averaged 11.4 points and a career second-best 11.2 rebounds per game.

In 1973–74 he had another fine season with the Sonics, averaging 11.3 points and 9.2 rebounds along with a career-best 2.9 assists per game. He still holds the SuperSonics single-game record for rebounds with 30, while adding 25 points and nine assists, which he collected in a win against the Los Angeles Lakers on December 26, 1973.

The 1974–75 season was his third full season with Seattle as Fox averaged 9.0 points and 6.5 rebounds per game.

On October 22, 1975, Fox was traded to the Milwaukee Bucks for a second-round draft pick. For the season, he averaged 3.9 points and 3.4 rebounds per game.

On October 20, 1976, the Bucks waived Fox, and a week later he signed with the New York Nets. In his final NBA season, he averaged 6.5 points and 4.6 rebounds per game.

Fox averaged 9.3 points and 7.4 rebounds in his 10-year NBA career.

== NBA career statistics ==
Legend
GP	Games played	GS	Games started	MPG	Minutes per game
FG%	Field goal percentage	3P%	3-point field goal percentage	FT%	Free throw percentage
RPG	Rebounds per game	APG	Assists per game	SPG	Steals per game
BPG	Blocks per game	PPG	Points per game	**Bold**	Career high

=== Regular season ===
Year	Team	GP	GS	MPG	FG%	3P%	FT%	RPG	APG	SPG	BPG	PPG
1967–68	Cincinnati	31	-	7.9	.405	-	.643	3.1	0.4	-	-	3.2
1967–68	Detroit	24	-	15.8	.415	-	.577	5.6	0.7	-	-	4.1
1968–69	Detroit	25	-	15.0	.469	-	.642	5.6	0.9	-	-	5.0
1968–69	Phoenix	51	-	**38.8**	.470	-	.734	**13.3**	2.8	-	-	**13.8**
1969–70	Phoenix	81	-	25.2	**.524**	-	.770	7.0	1.1	-	-	12.9
1970–71	Chicago	**82**	-	19.9	.458	-	.745	7.3	2.4	-	-	9.7
1971–72	Chicago	10	-	13.3	.377	-	.714	5.4	0.6	-	-	6.0
1971–72	Cincinnati	71	-	28.8	.454	-	.770	9.3	1.1	-	-	12.3
1972–73	Seattle	74	-	33.0	.515	-	.808	11.2	2.4	-	-	11.4
1973–74	Seattle	78	-	27.9	.478	-	.823	9.2	**2.9**	**0.7**	0.3	11.3
1974–75	Seattle	75	-	23.5	.469	-	.802	6.5	1.8	0.6	0.2	9.0
1975–76	Milwaukee	70	-	13.1	.517	-	.785	3.4	0.6	0.4	0.2	3.9
1976–77	New York	71	-	16.4	.462	-	**.833**	4.6	0.7	0.3	**0.4**	6.5
Career		743	-	23.3	.479	-	.770	7.4	1.6	0.5	0.3	9.3

=== Playoffs ===
Year	Team	GP	GS	MPG	FG%	3P%	FT%	RPG	APG	SPG	BPG	PPG
1967–68	Detroit	6	-	15.0	.316	-	.789	6.2	0.5	-	-	4.5
1969–70	Phoenix	6	-	**29.0**	.362	-	.708	**10.7**	1.3	-	-	11.2
1970–71	Chicago	7	-	23.9	.434	-	.684	9.4	**2.4**	-	-	**11.3**
1974–75	Seattle	**8**	-	5.0	.286	-	.571	1.1	0.3	0.0	0.1	1.5
1975–76	Milwaukee	3	-	11.0	**.800**	-	**1.000**	2.3	1.0	0.0	**0.3**	3.3
Career		30	-	16.8	.393	-	.718	6.1	1.1	0.0	0.2	6.5

== Personal life ==
After retiring from his 10-year NBA career, in 1978 Fox founded Sport Court of Arizona, which specializes in game court construction, outdoor recreation, performance sports products, and surfacing. Sport Court of Arizona serves residential communities and commercial properties in Scottsdale, Tucson, Phoenix and their surrounding areas.

In 2005, Fox was inducted into the South Carolina Athletic Hall of Fame.

His two sons, Mike and Jim Jr., who grew up on Sport Court products, have taken over the business since Jim Sr. has retired.

Fox has taken up watercolors in his retirement. He is a signature member of the Arizona Watercolor Association and the National Watercolor Society.

In 2018, Jim became a published illustrator with the debut of the bilingual picture book, Babies Nurse / Asi se alimentan los bebes (ISBN 978-1-930775-73-2) written by his daughter-in-law, Phoebe Fox. He is also the illustrator of Babies Bond and the author/illustrator of The Legend of the Verde River Smelter House and The Legend of the Jekyll Island Submarine.

He is a grandfather of five and resides in Phoenix with his wife, Mary Alice.

== See also ==
- List of National Basketball Association players with most rebounds in a game
