= Ann Winblad =

American businesswoman

Ann L. Winblad
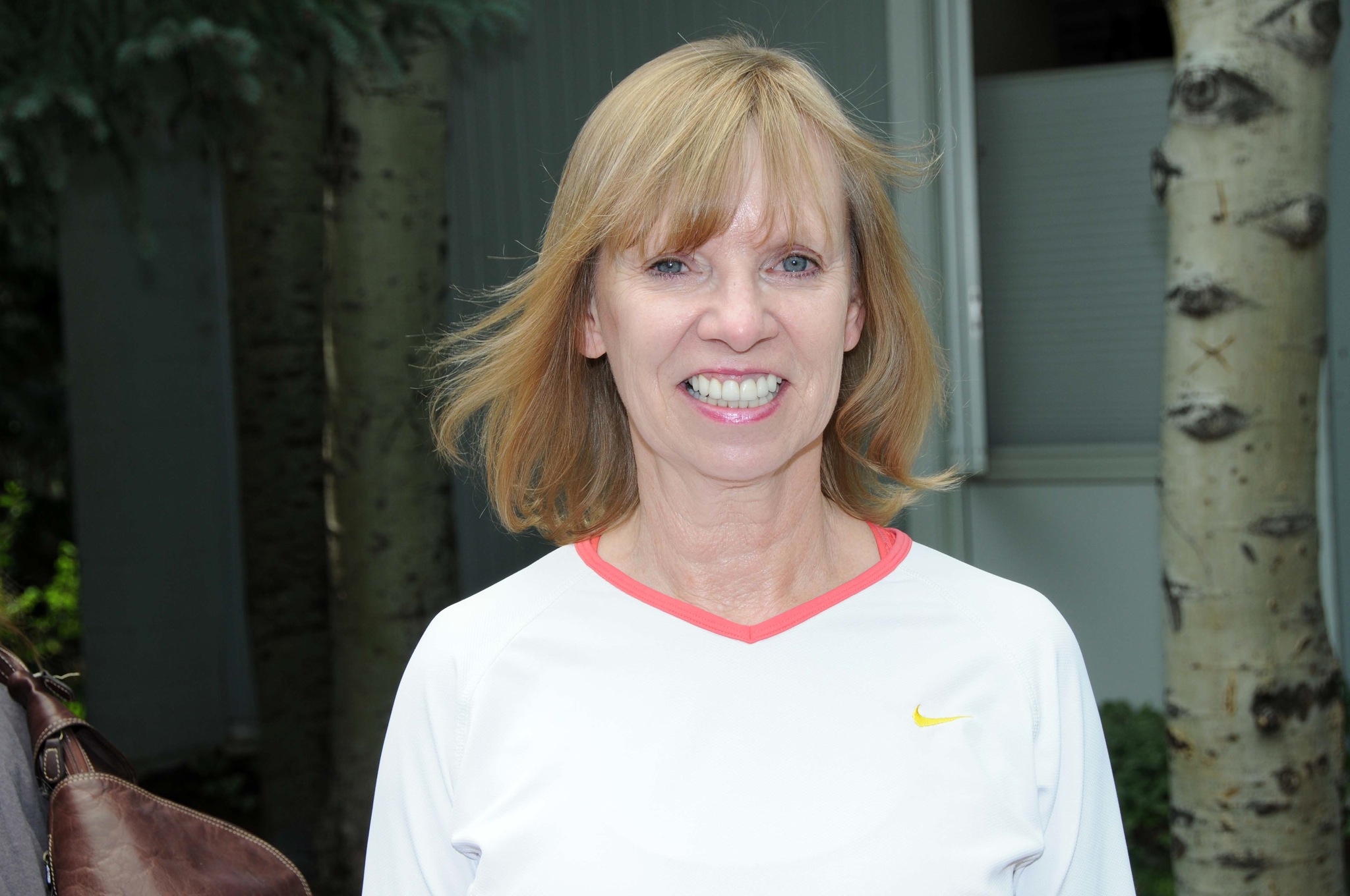
- Winblad in 2008
- Born: November 1, 1950 (age 75); Red Wing, Minnesota, U.S.
- Education: B.A., St. Catherine University; M.A., University of St. Thomas
- Occupations: Co-founder and partner of Hummer Winblad Venture Partners

Ann L. Winblad (born November 1, 1950) is an American businesswoman. She is a founding partner of Hummer Winblad Venture Partners.

== Early life and education ==
Winblad was born on November 1, 1950, in Red Wing, Minnesota. Born to father Wilbur Winblad and mother Elizabeth Stark, she and five other siblings grew up in Rushford and Farmington.

During her high school years, she was a cheerleader and student valedictorian. Winblad earned her Bachelor of Arts in Mathematics and in Business Administration from St. Catherine University and her master's degree in Education from the University of St. Thomas in St. Paul, Minnesota.

== Career ==
After earning her master's degree, Winblad joined the Federal Reserve as a systems programmer where she worked for 13 months. In 1976, Winblad and three co-workers left the Federal Reserve to found Open Systems, Inc, an accounting software startup, bootstrapping the company with $500. Winblad cooperated with investor Don Valentine and Open Systems sold its software via the vendor CADO Systems, which had been financed by Valentine. Open Systems was eventually sold in 1983 for $15 million.

In 1984 Winblad gave a candid interview about women in the tech industry.

After Open Systems Inc was sold, Winblad became a tech consultant for IBM and Microsoft. She also invested in Microsoft.

In 1989, Winblad and John Hummer co-founded the venture capital firm Hummer Winblad Venture Partners. It took nearly two years, however, to raise enough funds to launch it, with IBM and The St. Paul Companies as primary investors. In its fledgling years, Hummer Winblad Venture Partners launched 16 startups. Winblad became known as the most important female venture capitalist of her generation.

She received the John F. Cade Award for outstanding entrepreneurship in 1997. In 2000, Winblad was inducted into the Fortune Small Business Hall of Fame.

== Personal life ==
Winblad is an ex-girlfriend of Bill Gates. She met Gates at a Ben Rosen-Esther Dyson computer conference in 1984 and they dated until 1987. They have remained friends ever since. When Bill Gates was to marry Melinda Gates, he had an arrangement with her that he and Winblad could keep one vacation tradition alive from their dating years. Every spring, as they had done for over a decade, Gates would spend a long weekend with Winblad at her beach cottage on the Outer Banks of North Carolina, where they would ride dune buggies, hang-glide, walk on the beach, and share their thoughts about the world and themselves.

== Honors ==
- 2017 Award for Exemplary Women honoree.
- SVForum Visionary Award

== Bibliography ==
- Lambert, Laura. (2005). "Ann Winblad." in The Internet: A Historical Encyclopedia. Part 1, Biographies. Santa Barbara, CA: ABC-CLIO. p. 238–242.
