= Siltanen & Partners =

American advertising agency

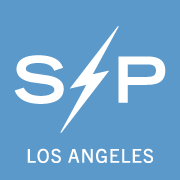
- Company type: Privately held company
- Industry: Advertising
- Founded: 1999; 27 years ago in Los Angeles, United States
- Founder: Rob Siltanen
- Headquarters: El Segundo, California, United States
- Products: Marketing campaigns
- Services: Advertising Agency
- Website: siltanen.com

Siltanen & Partners is an American advertising agency, located in El Segundo, California. It was founded by Rob Siltanen in 1999, following his departure from TBWA/Chiat/Day.

== Historic notable campaigns ==
=== Apple – “To the Crazy Ones” ===
Rob Siltanen's "To the Crazy Ones" manifesto launched "Think Different", a campaign for Apple. The campaign won the 2000 Grand Effie Award for the "most effective advertising in America" and won the Emmy Award for Best Commercial in 1998.

=== Nissan – “Toys” ===
In 1996, "Toys" was named commercial of the year by TIME, Rolling Stone, USA Today, and Adweek.

=== Amazon – “Kindle Fire” and “Kindle Fire HD” ===
Siltanen's Kindle Fire campaign was ranked as the #1 "most effective mobile technology advertising" of 2013 by Ace Metrix.

=== Coldwell Banker – “This is Home” and “Homes for Dogs” ===
Siltanen and Partner's has represented real estate company Coldwell Banker since 2011. A digital campaign aired in 2016 entitled "This is Home" features user-generated photos and videos.

In 2018, Coldwell Banker and Siltanen celebrated the fourth consecutive year of partnering with Adopt-a-Pet.com with “Old Dog, New Dog”.

=== Skechers – “Performance Division” ===
Siltanen & Partners was named the agency of record for Skechers in 2012. Siltanen & Partners launched the Skechers Performance Division, featuring standout Super Bowl commercials in 2012 and 2013. The company was later placed on Ad Age's 2015 Marketer A-List.

== Significant clients ==
Siltanen & Partners has produced work for a variety of clients, including Nissan, Apple Inc., Levi Strauss & Co., the International Olympic Committee, FreeInternet.com, Tellme Networks, Round Table Pizza, Rubio's Coastal Grill, EA Sports, Skechers, Amazon, Coldwell Banker, Suzuki, Panda Express, VTech, Togo's, and Pei Wei Asian Kitchen.
