= Netscape Application Server =

Netscape Application Server was an integrated software platform for developing and running transaction-oriented business applications on the web. It was developed originally by Kiva Software, which Netscape acquired in 1997.

When Netscape and Sun Microsystems formed the Sun-Netscape Alliance in 1999, the Netscape Application Server was chosen as the basis for their iPlanet Application Server offering over the NetDynamics Application Server, which had been acquired by Sun in 1998.

== See also ==
- iPlanet
- Sun ONE
- Sun Java System
- Comparison of application servers
