= 1973–74 Seattle SuperSonics season =

NBA professional basketball team season

- Head coach: Bill Russell
- General manager: Bill Russell
- Owners: Sam Schulman
- Arena: Seattle Center Coliseum

Results
- Record: 36–46 (.439)
- Place: Division: 3rd (Pacific); Conference: 6th (Western)
- Playoff finish: Did not qualify
- Stats at Basketball Reference

Local media
- Television: KTNT-TV
- Radio: KOMO (Bob Blackburn)

The 1973–74 Seattle SuperSonics season was the 7th season of the Seattle SuperSonics in the National Basketball Association (NBA). Following the resignation of Lenny Wilkens as a head coach after the 1971–72 season and a poor campaign in the 1972–73 season that saw the departure of general manager Bob Houbregs, the Sonics hired Boston Celtics' stalwart Bill Russell as head coach and general manager. With Russell at the helm, the team finished in 6th place in the Western Conference with a 36–46 record. The Sonics' home court, Seattle Center Coliseum, was the venue for the 1974 NBA All-Star Game.

== Offseason ==
The Sonics made only one trade during the offseason that sent All-Star Butch Beard to the Golden State Warriors and brought back a member of the original SuperSonics team, Walt Hazzard to Seattle.

=== Draft ===
Round	Pick	Player	Position	Nationality	College
1	4	Mike Green	C/F	United States	Louisiana Tech
4	56	June Harris	G	United States	North Carolina A&T
5	73	Chuck Iverson	F	United States	South Dakota
6	90	Bill McCoy	G	United States	Northern Iowa
7	107	Jim Andrews	C	United States	Kentucky
8	124	Wardell Jeffries	F	United States	Oklahoma Baptist
9	141	Greg Williams	F	United States	Seattle
10	155	Bob Bodell	G	United States	Maryland

== Roster ==
1973–74 Seattle SuperSonics roster
Players

Pos.	No.	Player	Height	Weight	DOB	From
G/F	40	John Brisker	6 ft 5 in (1.96 m)	210 lb (95 kg)	1947–06–15	Toledo
G	32	Fred Brown	6 ft 3 in (1.91 m)	182 lb (83 kg)	1948–08–07	Iowa
F/C	31	Jim Fox	6 ft 10 in (2.08 m)	230 lb (104 kg)	1943–04–07	South Carolina
G/F	21	Dick Gibbs	6 ft 5 in (1.96 m)	210 lb (95 kg)	1948–12–20	UTEP
F/C	24	Spencer Haywood	6 ft 8 in (2.03 m)	225 lb (102 kg)	1949–04–22	Detroit Mercy
G	42	Walt Hazzard	6 ft 2 in (1.88 m)	185 lb (84 kg)	1942–04–15	UCLA
F/C	14	John Hummer	6 ft 9 in (2.06 m)	230 lb (104 kg)	1948–05–04	Princeton
F	45	Vester Marshall	6 ft 7 in (2.01 m)	200 lb (91 kg)	1948–12–22	Oklahoma
F	43	Kennedy McIntosh	6 ft 7 in (2.01 m)	225 lb (102 kg)	1949–01–21	Eastern Michigan
G/F	10	Dick Snyder	6 ft 5 in (1.96 m)	207 lb (94 kg)	1944–02–01	Davidson
G/F	15	Bud Stallworth	6 ft 5 in (1.96 m)	190 lb (86 kg)	1950–01–18	Kansas
G	13	Slick Watts	6 ft 1 in (1.85 m)	175 lb (79 kg)	1951–07–22	Xavier (LA)
G	12	Milt Williams	6 ft 2 in (1.88 m)	182 lb (83 kg)	1945–11–22	Lincoln (MO)

Coaches
Head coach
- Bill Russell
Assistant(s)
- Em Bryant

Legend
- (DP) Unsigned draft pick
- (FA) Free agent
- (S) Suspended
- Injured

Roster

== Standings ==
Pacific Division	W	L	PCT	GB	Home	Road	Neutral	Div
y-Los Angeles Lakers	47	35	.573	–	30–11	17–24	–	14–12
Golden State Warriors	44	38	.537	3	23–18	20–20	1–0	15–11
Seattle SuperSonics	36	46	.439	11	22–19	14–27	–	12–14
Phoenix Suns	30	52	.366	17	24–17	6–34	0–1	11–15
Portland Trail Blazers	27	55	.329	20	22–19	5–34	0–2	13–13

#	Western Conference				
#	Team	W	L	PCT	GB
1	z-Milwaukee Bucks	59	23	.720	–
2	x-Chicago Bulls	54	28	.659	5
3	x-Detroit Pistons	52	30	.634	7
4	y-Los Angeles Lakers	47	35	.573	12
5	Golden State Warriors	44	38	.537	15
6	Seattle SuperSonics	36	46	.439	23
7	Kansas City–Omaha Kings	33	49	.402	26
8	Phoenix Suns	30	52	.366	29
9	Portland Trail Blazers	27	55	.329	32

- z – clinched division title
- y – clinched division title
- x – clinched playoff spot

== Game log ==
1973–74 game log
Total: 36–46 (Home: 22–19; Road: 14–27)
October: 3–9 (home: 3–4; road: 0–5)

Game	Date	Team	Score	High points	High rebounds	High assists	Location Attendance	Record
1	October 10	@ Phoenix	L 111–115	Fred Brown (31)	Jim Fox (11)	Walt Hazzard (6)	Arizona Veterans Memorial Coliseum; 18,738	0–1
2	October 12	Capital	W 103–102	Spencer Haywood (24)	Spencer Haywood (13)	Spencer Haywood, Walt Hazzard (6)	Seattle Center Coliseum; 11,673	1–1
3	October 14	Milwaukee	W 109–100	Jim McDaniels (29)	Jim McDaniels (18)	Dick Snyder (7)	Seattle Center Coliseum; 11,240	2–1
4	October 17	Kansas City–Omaha	L 106–108	Spencer Haywood (31)	Spencer Haywood (19)	Spencer Haywood (8)	Seattle Center Coliseum; 9,618	2–2
5	October 19	@ Los Angeles	L 91–118	Jim Fox, Spencer Haywood (16)	Spencer Haywood (13)	Milt Williams (5)	The Forum; 14,259	2–3
6	October 20	@ Portland	L 108–123	Dick Gibbs (25)	Spencer Haywood (8)	Spencer Haywood (9)	Memorial Coliseum; 9,251	2–4
7	October 21	Phoenix	W 116–112	Fred Brown (24)	Spencer Haywood (15)	Fred Brown, Spencer Haywood (8)	Seattle Center Coliseum; 11,964	3–4
8	October 24	Atlanta	L 106–131	Spencer Haywood (21)	Spencer Haywood (22)	Walt Hazzard (11)	Seattle Center Coliseum; 9,626	3–5
9	October 26	Golden State	L 110–117	Dick Snyder (27)	Spencer Haywood (16)	Fred Brown, Spencer Haywood (6)	Seattle Center Coliseum; 10,906	3–6
10	October 28	Detroit	L 93–115	Spencer Haywood (22)	Spencer Haywood (23)	Fred Brown (7)	Seattle Center Coliseum; 1,198	3–7
11	October 30	@ Buffalo	L 103–105	Spencer Haywood (31)	Spencer Haywood (13)	Fred Brown, Spencer Haywood (6)	Buffalo Memorial Auditorium; 7,396	3–8
12	October 31	@ Detroit	L 107–114	Fred Brown (31)	Spencer Haywood (14)	Fred Brown (7)	Cobo Arena; 4,748	3–9

November : 6–8 (home: 4–3; road: 2–5)

Game	Date	Team	Score	High points	High rebounds	High assists	Location Attendance	Record
13	November 2	@ Kansas City–Omaha	W 115–109	Fred Brown (37)	Fred Brown (13)	John Brisker, Fred Brown, Spencer Haywood (4)	Municipal Auditorium; 4,574	4–9
14	November 4	New York	L 106–111	Spencer Haywood (34)	Spencer Haywood (13)	Spencer Haywood (6)	Seattle Center Coliseum; 13,772	4–10
15	November 7	Buffalo	W 130–113	Spencer Haywood (26)	Spencer Haywood (16)	Fred Brown (7)	Seattle Center Coliseum; 8,878	5–10
16	November 9	Los Angeles	L 111–118	John Brisker (23)	Jim Fox (12)	Milt Williams (6)	Seattle Center Coliseum; 13,988	5–11
17	November 11	Chicago	L 98–116	Spencer Haywood (25)	Spencer Haywood (10)	Fred Brown (5)	Seattle Center Coliseum; 10,915	5–12
18	November 13	@ New York	L 102–104	Spencer Haywood (25)	Spencer Haywood (17)	Spencer Haywood (6)	Madison Square Garden; 17,478	5–13
19	November 14	@ Boston	L 104–110	Fred Brown, Spencer Haywood (22)	Spencer Haywood (13)	Fred Brown (6)	Seattle Center Coliseum; 6,191	5–14
20	November 16	Cleveland	W 117–93	Spencer Haywood (32)	Spencer Haywood (18)	Fred Brown (7)	Seattle Center Coliseum; 11,770	6–14
21	November 18	Philadelphia	W 95–91	Spencer Haywood (31)	Kennedy McIntosh (16)	Fred Brown (8)	Seattle Center Coliseum; 10,900	7–14
22	November 22	@ Portland	L 125–131	Spencer Haywood (28)	Jim Fox (9)	Fred Brown (10)	Memorial Coliseum; 7,285	7–15
23	November 23	Portland	W 127–106	Spencer Haywood, Isaac Stallworth (23)	Spencer Haywood, Kennedy McIntosh (9)	Fred Brown (12)	Seattle Center Coliseum; 13,330	8–15
24	November 25	@ Kansas City–Omaha	W 104–99	John Brisker (47)	Spencer Haywood (16)	John Brisker (5)	Municipal Auditorium; 4,213	9–15
25	November 27	@ Cleveland	L 118–120	Spencer Haywood (34)	Spencer Haywood (16)	Fred Brown (10)	Cleveland Arena; 3,357	9–16
26	November 28	@ Milwaukee	L 93–127	Isaac Stallworth (16)	Jim Fox (13)	Spencer Haywood (5)	Milwaukee Arena; 8,289	9–17

December : 8–10 (home: 4–4; road: 4–6)

Game	Date	Team	Score	High points	High rebounds	High assists	Location Attendance	Record
27	December 1	@ Atlanta	L 110–120	Spencer Haywood (26)	Kennedy McIntosh (15)	Fred Brown (8)	Omni Coliseum; 7,194	9–18
28	December 2	@ Capital	L 96–98	Slick Watts (24)	Jim Fox, Slick Watts (11)	Fred Brown, Slick Watts (6)	Capital Centre; 17,500	9–19
29	December 4	@ Chicago	L 107–130	Fred Brown (24)	Spencer Haywood (13)	Slick Watts (6)	Chicago Stadium; 5,104	9–20
30	December 6	Detroit	L 108–110	Spencer Haywood (29)	Spencer Haywood (17)	Slick Watts (9)	Seattle Center Coliseum; 7,758	9–21
31	December 7	@ Los Angeles	W 115–111	Spencer Haywood (29)	Spencer Haywood (23)	Slick Watts (10)	The Forum; 13,189	10–21
32	December 9	Houston	L 107–110	Spencer Haywood, Slick Watts (18)	Spencer Haywood (11)	Slick Watts (7)	Seattle Center Coliseum; 9,689	10–22
33	December 11	@ Milwaukee	L 91–130	Fred Brown (23)	Jim Fox, Spencer Haywood (7)	Spencer Haywood (4)	Milwaukee Arena; 7,075	10–23
34	December 12	@ Philadelphia	W 100–93	Dick Snyder (24)	Spencer Haywood (20)	Slick Watts (7)	The Spectrum; 3,432	11–23
35	December 14	Capital	W 93–88	Spencer Haywood (26)	Spencer Haywood (24)	Slick Watts (7)	Seattle Center Coliseum; 11,857	12–23
36	December 16	Phoenix	L 109–113	Spencer Haywood (28)	Spencer Haywood (18)	Fred Brown (8)	Seattle Center Coliseum; 9,778	12–24
37	December 18	@ Chicago	W 93–92	Spencer Haywood (23)	Spencer Haywood (11)	Slick Watts (12)	Chicago Stadium; 4,721	13–24
38	December 19	@ Houston	W 124–118 (OT)	Spencer Haywood (37)	Spencer Haywood (15)	Jim Fox (7)	Hofheinz Pavilion; 2,371	14–24
39	December 21	@ Cleveland	L 96–101	Dick Snyder (35)	Spencer Haywood (12)	Jim Fox (10)	Cleveland Arena; 2,173	14–25
40	December 23	Boston	L 95–96	Spencer Haywood (23)	Spencer Haywood (13)	Slick Watts (12)	Seattle Center Coliseum; 13,970	14–26
41	December 26	Los Angeles	W 129–105	Jim Fox (25)	Jim Fox (30)	Slick Watts (12)	Seattle Center Coliseum; 12,755	15–26
42	December 27	@ Phoenix	L 100–111	Dick Snyder (32)	Jim Fox (14)	Slick Watts (9)	Arizona Veterans Memorial Coliseum; 7,555	15–27
43	December 28	Portland	W 110–93	Spencer Haywood (26)	Jim Fox, Spencer Haywood (19)	Slick Watts (8)	Seattle Center Coliseum; 10,245	16–27
44	December 30	Golden State	W 96–92	Jim Fox (29)	Spencer Haywood (17)	Slick Watts (12)	Seattle Center Coliseum; 14,078	17–27

January : 7–6 (home: 3–2; road: 4–4)

Game	Date	Team	Score	High points	High rebounds	High assists	Location Attendance	Record
45	January 2	Buffalo	L 111–115	Spencer Haywood (35)	Jim Fox (16)	Jim Fox (10)	Seattle Center Coliseum; 12,011	17–28
46	January 4	Chicago	W 103–101 (OT)	Spencer Haywood (31)	Jim Fox (21)	Slick Watts (17)	Seattle Center Coliseum; 12,042	18–28
47	January 6	Houston	W 91–90	Spencer Haywood (34)	Jim Fox (13)	Slick Watts (12)	Seattle Center Coliseum; 12,184	19–28
48	January 9	Kansas City–Omaha	W 100–96	Dick Snyder (25)	Spencer Haywood (11)	Jim Fox (7)	Seattle Center Coliseum; 10,048	20–28
49	January 10	@ Golden State	L 89–125	Jim Fox (15)	John Hummer (9)	Milt Williams (3)	Oakland–Alameda County Coliseum Arena; 3,032	20–29
50	January 11	New York	L 98–107	Dick Snyder (29)	Jim Fox (18)	Slick Watts (9)	Seattle Center Coliseum; 14,078	20–30
51	January 13	@ Phoenix	W 123–112	Fred Brown (38)	Spencer Haywood (15)	Dick Snyder (9)	Arizona Veterans Memorial Coliseum; 5,769	21–30
52	January 18	@ Philadelphia	W 116–104	Spencer Haywood (25)	Spencer Haywood (15)	Fred Brown (11)	The Spectrum; 3,108	22–30
53	January 19	@ Atlanta	L 109–127	Dick Snyder (41)	Jim Fox (16)	Fred Brown (5)	Omni Coliseum; 6,938	22–31
54	January 23	@ Boston	W 98–97	Fred Brown (26)	Jim Fox (12)	Fred Brown (6)	Boston Garden; 6,237	23–31
55	January 25	@ Chicago	L 99–104	Spencer Haywood (33)	Spencer Haywood (12)	Fred Brown (7)	Chicago Stadium; 9,422	23–32
56	January 26	@ Detroit	L 83–94	Dick Snyder (18)	Spencer Haywood (13)	Walt Hazzard (9)	Cobo Arena; 8,386	23–33
57	January 29	@ Houston	W 115–107	Spencer Haywood (32)	Spencer Haywood (16)	John Hummer (8)	Hofheinz Pavilion; 3,027	24–33

February : 6–6 (home: 6–2; road: 0–4)

Game	Date	Team	Score	High points	High rebounds	High assists	Location Attendance	Record
58	February 1	Milwaukee	W 110–85	Dick Snyder (24)	John Hummer (14)	Fred Brown (7)	Seattle Center Coliseum; 14,017	25–33
59	February 2	@ Portland	L 97–102	Spencer Haywood (25)	Spencer Haywood (14)	Slick Watts (12)	Memorial Coliseum; 7,526	25–34
60	February 3	Detroit	L 100–114	Spencer Haywood, Dick Snyder (24)	Spencer Haywood (18)	Slick Watts (14)	Seattle Center Coliseum; 14,078	25–35
61	February 5	@ Golden State	L 113–129	Jim Fox, Spencer Haywood (24)	Spencer Haywood (10)	Dick Snyder (7)	Oakland–Alameda County Coliseum Arena; 4,197	25–36
62	February 6	Portland	W 107–94	Dick Gibbs (30)	Dick Gibbs (14)	Slick Watts (9)	Seattle Center Coliseum; 11,204	26–36
63	February 10	Kansas City–Omaha	W 119–103	Spencer Haywood (24)	Spencer Haywood (17)	Slick Watts (9)	Seattle Center Coliseum; 13,608	27–36
64	February 13	Boston	W 118–100	Dick Snyder (31)	John Hummer (16)	Fred Brown (12)	Seattle Center Coliseum; 12,031	28–36
65	February 15	@ Los Angeles	L 96–112	Dick Snyder (22)	John Hummer (16)	John Hummer (7)	The Forum; 15,263	28–37
66	February 17	Cleveland	W 106–97	Fred Brown (24)	Spencer Haywood (12)	Walt Hazzard (11)	Seattle Center Coliseum; 14,078	29–37
67	February 23	Los Angeles	L 116–118	Spencer Haywood (32)	Jim Fox (12)	Slick Watts (11)	Seattle Center Coliseum; 14,078	29–38
68	February 24	Philadelphia	W 115–105	Spencer Haywood (37)	Spencer Haywood (20)	Fred Brown (13)	Seattle Center Coliseum; 13,779	30–38
69	February 27	@ Capital	L 100–104	Fred Brown (28)	Spencer Haywood (17)	Fred Brown, Dick Snyder (6)	Capital Centre; 5,140	30–39

March : 6–9 (home: 2–4; road: 4–5)

Game	Date	Team	Score	High points	High rebounds	High assists	Location Attendance	Record
70	March 1	@ Detroit	W 105–103	Spencer Haywood (16)	Spencer Haywood (21)	Fred Brown, Spencer Haywood, Slick Watts (3)	Cobo Arena; 6,694	31–39
71	March 2	@ Milwaukee	L 99–116	Dick Snyder (25)	Spencer Haywood (16)	Spencer Haywood (7)	Milwaukee Arena; 10,938	31–40
72	March 5	@ New York	L 106–111	Spencer Haywood (27)	Spencer Haywood (19)	Spencer Haywood, John Hummer, Slick Watts (4)	Madison Square Garden; 19,964	31–41
73	March 8	@ Buffalo	W 123–117 (OT)	Spencer Haywood (31)	Spencer Haywood (21)	Slick Watts (10)	Buffalo Memorial Auditorium; 16,218	32–41
74	March 9	@ Kansas City–Omaha	L 96–106	Dick Gibbs (25)	John Hummer (11)	Slick Watts (3)	Omaha Civic Auditorium; 3,870	32–42
75	March 15	Atlanta	L 107–126	Fred Brown (26)	Spencer Haywood (14)	Slick Watts (6)	Seattle Center Coliseum; 14,078	32–43
76	March 17	Phoenix	L 108–133	Dick Snyder (28)	Jim Fox, Spencer Haywood (10)	Fred Brown (7)	Seattle Center Coliseum; 13,007	32–44
77	March 20	Golden State	W 110–107	Dick Snyder (30)	Jim Fox, John Hummer (10)	Dick Snyder (10)	Seattle Center Coliseum; 10,657	33–44
78	March 22	Milwaukee	L 101–106	Dick Snyder (28)	Jim Fox (15)	Fred Brown (7)	Seattle Center Coliseum; 13,771	33–45
79	March 23	@ Golden State	W 139–137	Fred Brown (58)	Jim Fox, Dick Snyder (11)	Slick Watts (7)	Oakland–Alameda County Coliseum Arena; 7,570	34–45
80	March 24	Chicago	L 113–122	Fred Brown (29)	Jim Fox (18)	Jim Fox, Dick Snyder (6)	Seattle Center Coliseum; 12,430	34–46
81	March 26	@ Los Angeles	W 121–115	Fred Brown (37)	Jim Fox (13)	Dick Snyder (6)	The Forum; 13,489	35–46
82	March 27	Phoenix	W 127–123	Fred Brown (34)	John Hummer (14)	Jim Fox (8)	Seattle Center Coliseum; 12,528	36–46

1973–74 season schedule

== Player statistics ==
Legend
GP	Games played	GS	Games started	MPG	Minutes per game
FG%	Field-goal percentage	3P%	3-point field-goal percentage	FT%	Free-throw percentage
RPG	Rebounds per game	APG	Assists per game	SPG	Steals per game
BPG	Blocks per game	PPG	Points per game

Player	GP	GS	MPG	FG%	3FG%	FT%	RPG	APG	SPG	BPG	PPG
John Brisker	35	–	20.5	.449	–	.820	4.2	1.6	.8	.2	12.5
Fred Brown	82	–	30.5	.471	–	.863	4.9	5.0	1.7	.2	16.5
Jim Fox	78	–	27.9	.478	–	.823	9.2	2.9	.7	.3	11.3
Dick Gibbs	71	–	21.5	.431	–	.806	3.1	1.1	.5	.3	10.8
Spencer Haywood	75	–	40.5	.457	–	.814	13.4	3.2	.9	1.4	23.5
Walt Hazzard	49	–	11.7	.422	–	.756	1.2	2.5	.5	.1	3.8
John Hummer	35	–	26.7	.467	–	.469	7.0	2.7	.7	.6	8.2
Vester Marshall	13	–	13.4	.241	–	.429	2.8	.3	.3	.2	1.3
Jim McDaniels	27	–	16.3	.364	–	.535	4.7	.9	.3	.6	5.5
Kennedy McIntosh	69	–	29.8	.389	–	.607	5.2	1.4	.8	.4	7.4
Dick Snyder	74	–	36.1	.481	–	.866	4.1	3.6	1.2	.4	18.1
Isaac Stallworth	67	–	15.2	.392	–	.623	2.6	.5	.3	.2	6.3
Slick Watts	62	–	23.0	.388	–	.645	2.9	5.7	1.9	.2	8.0
Milt Williams	53	–	9.5	.416	–	.651	.9	1.9	.5	.0	3.1

== Awards and records ==
- Spencer Haywood was selected to the All-NBA Second Team and represented the West in the 1974 NBA All-Star Game.

== Transactions ==
=== Overview ===
Players Added	Players Lost
Via trade: Dick Gibbs; Walt Hazzard; John Hummer; Via free agency: Vester Marshall; Slick Watts; Milt Williams	Via trade: Butch Beard; Waived: Charles Dudley; Jim McDaniels; Lee Winfield

=== Trades ===
May 15, 1973	To Seattle SuperSonics	To Kansas City–Omaha Kings
May 15, 1973	Dick Gibbs	Completion of the trade for Pete Cross and Don Kojis
July 25, 1973	To Seattle SuperSonics	To Golden State Warriors
July 25, 1973	Walt Hazzard	Butch Beard
January 7, 1974	To Seattle SuperSonics	To Chicago Bulls
January 7, 1974	John Hummer	1974 second round pick Cash considerations
