= Aria Systems =

American software company

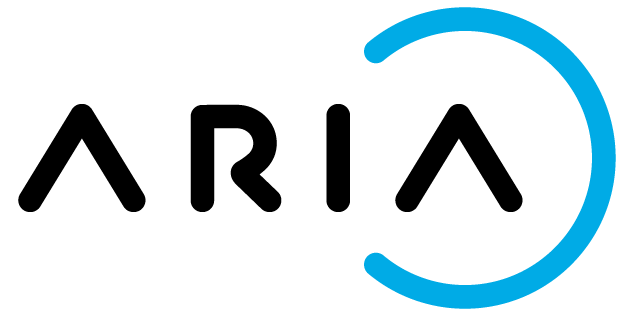
- Type: Private
- Industry: SaaS
- Founded: 2002; 24 years ago in Media, Pennsylvania, U.S.
- Founders: Brendan O'Brien; Ed Sullivan
- Headquarters: San Francisco, United States
- Area served: Worldwide
- Key people: Tom Dibble (CEO)
- Website: ariasystems.com

Aria Systems is an American software company that provides a cloud-based SaaS billing and monetization platform for enterprises. It is based in San Francisco, California.

== History ==
Aria Systems was founded in 2002 by Brendan O'Brien and Edward "Ed" Sullivan in Media, Pennsylvania, to provide a cloud-based billing platform for businesses with recurring revenue models, as an alternative to locally installed billing platforms.

Aria received its first major institutional funding in 2007 with a $4 million Series A round led by Hummer Winblad Venture Partners. As the adoption of its cloud billing platform grew, Aria expanded its operations. In 2011, Aria raised $20 million in an investment round led by InterWest with participation of Hummer-Winblad and Venrock.

In 2012, Tom Dibble was appointed CEO. The following year, Aria opened its first international office in London and raised a $40 million Series D round led by Bain Capital Ventures.

In 2016, Aria raised an additional $50 million in Series E financing led by Rembrandt Venture Partners and Madison Bay Capital. In the same year, Aria was listed on Deloitte’s Technology Fast 500.

In August 2021, Aria raised $90 million in a growth capital investment round led by Goldman Sachs Asset Management.

== Platform ==
Aria Systems provides a cloud-based billing automation platform to manage subscription and recurring billing for enterprises. It integrates with payment gateways and back‑office enterprise systems, such as CRM and ERP.

In 2016, Aria launched "Aria for Connected Vehicles," to monetize automotive IoT services. In 2024, Aria introduced an AI chatbot called Aria Billie.
