= 1973–74 Golden State Warriors season =

NBA professional basketball team season

- Head coach: Al Attles
- Arena: Oakland-Alameda County Coliseum Arena

Results
- Record: 44–38 (.537)
- Place: Division: 2nd (Pacific); Conference: 5th (Western)
- Playoff finish: Did not qualify
- Stats at Basketball Reference

Local media
- Television: KTVU
- Radio: KGO (Bill King)

The 1973–74 NBA season was the Warriors' 28th season in the NBA and 12th in the San Francisco Bay Area.

== Offseason ==
=== Draft picks ===
| Round | Pick | Player | Position | Nationality | College |
|---|---|---|---|---|---|
| 1 | 11 | Kevin Joyce | G | United States | South Carolina |
| 2 | 29 | Derrek Dickey | F | United States | Cincinnati |
| 3 | 46 | Jim Retseck | F | United States | Auburn |
| 4 | 63 | Ron King | G | United States | Florida State |
| 5 | 80 | Nate Stephens | C | United States | Long Beach State |
| 6 | 97 | Bob Lauriski | | United States | Utah State |
| 7 | 114 | Steve Smith | F | United States | Loyola Marymount |
| 8 | 131 | Jeff Dawson | G | United States | Illinois |
| 9 | 146 | Everett Fopma | | United States | Idaho State |
| 10 | 160 | Fred Lavoroni | | United States | Santa Clara |

== Roster ==
Golden State Warriors roster
Players

| Pos. | No. | Player | Height | Weight | DOB | From |
|---|---|---|---|---|---|---|
| G | 25 | Jim Barnett | 6 ft 4 in (1.93 m) | 170 lb (77 kg) | | Oregon |
| F | 24 | Rick Barry | 6 ft 7 in (2.01 m) | 205 lb (93 kg) | | Miami (FL) |
| G | 21 | Butch Beard | 6 ft 3 in (1.91 m) | 185 lb (84 kg) | | Louisville |
| F | 40 | Derrek Dickey | 6 ft 7 in (2.01 m) | 218 lb (99 kg) | | Cincinnati |
| F | 31 | Joe Ellis | 6 ft 6 in (1.98 m) | 175 lb (79 kg) | | San Francisco |
| G | 10 | Charles Johnson | 6 ft 0 in (1.83 m) | 170 lb (77 kg) | | California |
| C | 52 | George Johnson | 6 ft 11 in (2.11 m) | 205 lb (93 kg) | | Dillard |
| F/C | 43 | Clyde Lee | 6 ft 10 in (2.08 m) | 205 lb (93 kg) | | Vanderbilt |
| G | 23 | Jeff Mullins | 6 ft 4 in (1.93 m) | 190 lb (86 kg) | | Duke |
| F | 32 | Cazzie Russell | 6 ft 5 in (1.96 m) | 218 lb (99 kg) | | Michigan |
| F/C | 42 | Nate Thurmond | 6 ft 11 in (2.11 m) | 225 lb (102 kg) | | Bowling Green |

Coaches
Head coach
- Al Attles (North Carolina A&T)

Legend
- (DP) Unsigned draft pick
- (FA) Free agent
- (S) Suspended
- Injured

== Regular season ==
=== Season standings ===
| Pacific Division | W | L | PCT | GB | Home | Road | Neutral | Div |
|---|---|---|---|---|---|---|---|---|
| y-Los Angeles Lakers | 47 | 35 | .573 | – | 30–11 | 17–24 | – | 14–12 |
| Golden State Warriors | 44 | 38 | .537 | 3 | 23–18 | 20–20 | 1–0 | 15–11 |
| Seattle SuperSonics | 36 | 46 | .439 | 11 | 22–19 | 14–27 | – | 12–14 |
| Phoenix Suns | 30 | 52 | .366 | 17 | 24–17 | 6–34 | 0–1 | 11–15 |
| Portland Trail Blazers | 27 | 55 | .329 | 20 | 22–19 | 5–34 | 0–2 | 13–13 |

| # | Western Conference | | | | |
| # | Team | W | L | PCT | GB |
|---|---|---|---|---|---|
| 1 | z-Milwaukee Bucks | 59 | 23 | .720 | – |
| 2 | x-Chicago Bulls | 54 | 28 | .659 | 5 |
| 3 | x-Detroit Pistons | 52 | 30 | .634 | 7 |
| 4 | y-Los Angeles Lakers | 47 | 35 | .573 | 12 |
| 5 | Golden State Warriors | 44 | 38 | .537 | 15 |
| 6 | Seattle SuperSonics | 36 | 46 | .439 | 23 |
| 7 | Kansas City–Omaha Kings | 33 | 49 | .402 | 26 |
| 8 | Phoenix Suns | 30 | 52 | .366 | 29 |
| 9 | Portland Trail Blazers | 27 | 55 | .329 | 32 |

z – clinched division title
y – clinched division title
x – clinched playoff spot

=== Game log ===
1973–74 Game log
| # | Date | Opponent | Score | High points | Record |
| 1 | October 13 | Milwaukee | 97–85 | Jim Barnett (24) | 0–1 |
| 2 | October 14 | @ Phoenix | 120–95 | Rick Barry (23) | 1–1 |
| 3 | October 17 | @ Milwaukee | 95–109 | Jim Barnett (28) | 1–2 |
| 4 | October 20 | Kansas City–Omaha | 81–100 | Cazzie Russell (26) | 2–2 |
| 5 | October 23 | Phoenix | 109–121 | Cazzie Russell (27) | 3–2 |
| 6 | October 26 | @ Seattle | 117–110 | Cazzie Russell (41) | 4–2 |
| 7 | October 27 | Atlanta | 125–116 | Cazzie Russell (29) | 4–3 |
| 8 | November 2 | @ Boston | 105–108 | Rick Barry (29) | 4–4 |
| 9 | November 3 | @ Buffalo | 124–121 (OT) | Rick Barry (36) | 5–4 |
| 10 | November 4 | @ Kansas City–Omaha | 92–91 | Rick Barry (26) | 6–4 |
| 11 | November 8 | Chicago | 112–111 | Barry, Mullins (20) | 6–5 |
| 12 | November 10 | Buffalo | 105–128 | Cazzie Russell (46) | 7–5 |
| 13 | November 13 | Cleveland | 115–128 | Rick Barry (43) | 8–5 |
| 14 | November 17 | Philadelphia | 109–106 | Rick Barry (28) | 8–6 |
| 15 | November 20 | @ Milwaukee | 108–105 | Rick Barry (31) | 9–6 |
| 16 | November 22 | @ Atlanta | 101–99 | Jeff Mullins (21) | 10–6 |
| 17 | November 23 | N Philadelphia | 106–111 | Cazzie Russell (36) | 11–6 |
| 18 | November 24 | @ New York | 107–99 | Jim Barnett (24) | 12–6 |
| 19 | November 27 | @ Chicago | 117–123 | Rick Barry (27) | 12–7 |
| 20 | November 29 | Portland | 89–119 | Rick Barry (22) | 13–7 |
| 21 | December 1 | Kansas City–Omaha | 108–120 | Cazzie Russell (37) | 14–7 |
| 22 | December 4 | Detroit | 112–93 | Cazzie Russell (24) | 14–8 |
| 23 | December 5 | @ Phoenix | 97–103 | Jeff Mullins (22) | 14–9 |
| 24 | December 8 | Los Angeles | 111–135 | Rick Barry (50) | 15–9 |
| 25 | December 11 | Houston | 107–114 | Cazzie Russell (49) | 16–9 |
| 26 | December 14 | @ Portland | 101–109 | Cazzie Russell (37) | 16–10 |
| 27 | December 15 | Capital | 106–93 | Rick Barry (32) | 16–11 |
| 28 | December 18 | Boston | 125–106 | Rick Barry (32) | 16–12 |
| 29 | December 21 | @ Detroit | 104–107 | Rick Barry (35) | 16–13 |
| 30 | December 22 | @ Chicago | 86–110 | Cazzie Russell (29) | 16–14 |
| 31 | December 23 | @ Kansas City–Omaha | 93–101 | Barry, Russell (22) | 16–15 |
| 32 | December 27 | Portland | 118–117 | Rick Barry (32) | 16–16 |
| 33 | December 29 | Los Angeles | 100–102 | Cazzie Russell (29) | 17–16 |
| 34 | December 30 | @ Seattle | 92–96 | Cazzie Russell (35) | 17–17 |
| 35 | January 1 | Chicago | 91–80 | Cazzie Russell (24) | 17–18 |
| 36 | January 4 | @ Los Angeles | 111–114 | Jeff Mullins (27) | 17–19 |
| 37 | January 5 | Houston | 106–108 | Rick Barry (34) | 18–19 |
| 38 | January 6 | @ Portland | 105–106 | Rick Barry (37) | 18–20 |
| 39 | January 8 | @ Houston | 104–92 | Rick Barry (22) | 19–20 |
| 40 | January 10 | Seattle | 89–125 | Rick Barry (21) | 20–20 |
| 41 | January 12 | New York | 96–80 | Jeff Mullins (23) | 20–21 |
| 42 | January 17 | Phoenix | 120–127 | Rick Barry (44) | 21–21 |
| 43 | January 19 | @ Capital | 90–117 | Rick Barry (26) | 21–22 |
| 44 | January 20 | @ Boston | 123–102 | Jeff Mullins (29) | 22–22 |
| 45 | January 22 | Capital | 97–99 | Rick Barry (25) | 23–22 |
| 46 | January 26 | Cleveland | 93–106 | Rick Barry (37) | 24–22 |
| 47 | January 29 | @ Buffalo | 128–121 | Rick Barry (30) | 25–22 |
| 48 | January 30 | @ Atlanta | 129–122 | Rick Barry (40) | 26–22 |
| 49 | January 31 | @ Houston | 109–108 | Rick Barry (38) | 27–22 |
| 50 | February 2 | Milwaukee | 91–120 | Jeff Mullins (32) | 28–22 |
| 51 | February 5 | Seattle | 113–129 | Jeff Mullins (23) | 29–22 |
| 52 | February 7 | Detroit | 110–86 | Nate Thurmond (18) | 29–23 |
| 53 | February 9 | Kansas City–Omaha | 121–120 | Rick Barry (41) | 29–24 |
| 54 | February 10 | @ Phoenix | 121–105 | Rick Barry (30) | 30–24 |
| 55 | February 12 | Boston | 107–102 | Rick Barry (37) | 30–25 |
| 56 | February 14 | Atlanta | 105–121 | Rick Barry (33) | 31–25 |
| 57 | February 16 | @ New York | 107–117 | Rick Barry (38) | 31–26 |
| 58 | February 17 | @ Chicago | 108–105 | Nate Thurmond (31) | 32–26 |
| 59 | February 19 | @ Cleveland | 104–98 | Cazzie Russell (37) | 33–26 |
| 60 | February 20 | @ Kansas City–Omaha | 97–116 | Cazzie Russell (27) | 33–27 |
| 61 | February 21 | @ Cleveland | 122–103 | Barry, G. Johnson (23) | 34–27 |
| 62 | February 23 | Philadelphia | 106–125 | Rick Barry (51) | 35–27 |
| 63 | February 26 | Phoenix | 100–120 | Rick Barry (32) | 36–27 |
| 64 | February 28 | Portland | 109–129 | Rick Barry (42) | 37–27 |
| 65 | March 2 | Chicago | 88–103 | Rick Barry (43) | 38–27 |
| 66 | March 3 | @ Los Angeles | 104–108 | Cazzie Russell (29) | 38–28 |
| 67 | March 5 | Detroit | 95–93 | Rick Barry (36) | 38–29 |
| 68 | March 7 | @ Milwaukee | 97–95 | Rick Barry (31) | 39–29 |
| 69 | March 8 | @ Philadelphia | 106–96 | Rick Barry (28) | 40–29 |
| 70 | March 10 | @ Capital | 107–117 | Rick Barry (30) | 40–30 |
| 71 | March 11 | @ Detroit | 120–108 | Rick Barry (40) | 41–30 |
| 72 | March 12 | @ Detroit | 108–113 | Rick Barry (23) | 41–31 |
| 73 | March 14 | New York | 107–95 | Rick Barry (22) | 41–32 |
| 74 | March 15 | @ Los Angeles | 112–107 | Cazzie Russell (35) | 42–32 |
| 75 | March 16 | Los Angeles | 105–135 | Cazzie Russell (34) | 43–32 |
| 76 | March 19 | Milwaukee | 111–100 | Jeff Mullins (25) | 43–33 |
| 77 | March 20 | @ Seattle | 107–110 | Rick Barry (36) | 43–34 |
| 78 | March 21 | Buffalo | 115–102 | Beard, Russell (27) | 43–35 |
| 79 | March 23 | Seattle | 139–137 | Rick Barry (34) | 43–36 |
| 80 | March 24 | @ Phoenix | 121–134 | Cazzie Russell (46) | 43–37 |
| 81 | March 26 | Portland | 120–143 | Rick Barry (64) | 44–37 |
| 82 | March 27 | @ Portland | 122–132 | Cazzie Russell (30) | 44–38 |

== Awards and records ==
- Nate Thurmond, NBA All-Star Game
- Rick Barry, NBA All-Star Game
- Rick Barry, All-NBA First Team
- Nate Thurmond, NBA All-Defensive Second Team
