= Kiva Software =

Kiva Software was the leading provider and pioneer of internet application server software. Kiva Software released the industry's first application server in January 1996, offering companies a robust platform on which to develop and deploy transaction-oriented business applications on the Web. Kiva's customers included Bank of America, E-Trade, Travelocity, Internet Shopping Network, Hong Kong Telecom and Pacific Bell Internet.

Headquartered in Mountain View, California, Kiva Software was a privately held company (1994 - 1997) backed by venture capitalists, including Wiess, Peck & Greer, Greylock, Discovery Ventures, Sippl MacDonald Ventures, Norwest Venture Capital, and Trinity Ventures.

== History ==
Kiva Software was founded in May 1994 by Keng Lim, its chairman and CEO, who saw the opportunity to leverage the internet as a platform for running business applications. In January 1996, Kiva Enterprise Server was launched. It was the first Java application server to market, and it also supported application development in C++.

By mid-1997, the company had shipped two major releases of Kiva Enterprise Server; grown to over 100 employees at five field offices; raised US$13.9 million in capital investment over two rounds of funding; and, according to Lim in a Red Herring interview, was expecting to go public by the middle of 1998, barring an acquisition.

In December 1997, Kiva Software was acquired by Netscape Communications as an "important strategic technology for linking people and businesses together through Intranets, Extranets and the Internet." Netscape issued 6.3 million shares of Netscape stock to purchase 100 percent of Kiva stock and options, a deal valued at US$180 million. Kiva Enterprise Server was folded into Netscape's suite of server products and became Netscape Application Server.

In 1999, America Online (AOL) acquired Netscape in a stock swap valued at US$10 billion, and formed a partnership with Sun Microsystems. As part of the three-way deal, Sun Microsystems licensed Netscape's server software for $350 million over three years. The Sun-Netscape alliance rolled out a new brand name, iPlanet, which was used for all the server products. The Netscape Application Server was chosen as the code base for the iPlanet Application Server, even though there had been talk that the iPlanet Application Server would be a combination of both Netscape Application Server and NetDynamics Application Server. NetDynamics, a former competitor of Kiva Software, had been acquired by Sun in 1998, prior to the Sun-Netscape alliance.

In 2002, when the three-year alliance between AOL/Netscape and Sun ended, per the agreement, Sun took sole control of the iPlanet software. iPlanet was absorbed into Sun, and iPlanet Application Server was rebranded as Sun ONE Application Server, and, later, the Sun Java System Application Server.

== Products ==
Kiva Software's products included Kiva Enterprise Server, the platform on which web applications were deployed and managed; Kiva Application Builder, the graphical development tool for building applications; and the Kiva SDK (available in both Java and C++), which packaged foundation classes and methods.

== Awards and recognition ==
In 1997, Kiva Software was selected as one of the industry's top privately held technology companies by Red Herring, Computerworld, and Data Communications magazine. That same year, Kiva Enterprise Server won PC Week's Best of Comdex award for "Best Internet Software" at Comdex.

As Kiva Enterprise Server evolved into Netscape Application server and then into iPlanet Application Server, the product continued to lead technologically (although not in market share) in the increasingly competitive and crowded marketplace of application servers. In 2000, Netscape Application 4.0 achieved the highest rating in a head-to-head comparison of application servers by independent researcher D.H. Brown Associates. In 2001, Standard & Poors (S&P) concluded that iPlanet Application Server was the best choice for running its web services business after conducting two rounds of evaluations.
