= Vester Marshall =

American basketball player

Personal information
- Born: December 22, 1948 Tuscaloosa, Alabama, U.S.
- Died: January 5, 2023 (aged 74) Shoreline, Washington, U.S.
- Listed height: 6 ft 7 in (2.01 m)
- Listed weight: 200 lb (91 kg)

Career information
- High school: Druid (Tuscaloosa, Alabama)
- College: Oklahoma (1968–1970)
- NBA draft: 1971: undrafted
- Position: Small forward
- Number: 45

Career history
- 1973–1974: Seattle SuperSonics
- Stats at NBA.com
- Stats at Basketball Reference

Vester Marshall Jr. (December 22, 1948 – January 5, 2023) was an American professional basketball small forward who played one season in the National Basketball Association (NBA) as a member of the Seattle SuperSonics during the 1973–74 season.

== Biography ==
Marshall was born on December 22, 1948, in Tuscaloosa, Alabama. He became a standout basketball player for the Druid High School in Tuscaloosa where he led his team to the state championship his first year. Marshall participated in the Selma to Montgomery marches along with Martin Luther King Jr. and other leaders of the Civil Rights Movement. He attended University of Oklahoma where his teammates included Garfield Heard and Clifford Ray. Coach John MacLeod removed Marshall from the basketball team for leading a racially motivated protest. He missed the 1970–71 season due to his suspension.

After graduating, he went to Mexico to play professional basketball. In December 1973 the Seattle SuperSonics waived Jim McDaniels and replaced him on the roster by Marshall who signed for the league minimum US$25,000 ($146,088.44 adjusted for inflation). He practices yoga and has been an instructor in Seattle, Washington. He was an assistant coach at Bellevue Community College for two years (1978–79). Marshall has been an ordained minister since 2006. In 2008, the Seattle Post-Intelligencer wrote an article on Marshall where it stated he lived in a studio apartment in Seattle working as a street minister, herbalist and artist.

Marshall died on January 5, 2023, at the age of 74 in Shoreline, Washington.

== Career statistics ==
Legend
GP	Games played	GS	Games started	MPG	Minutes per game
FG%	Field goal percentage	3P%	3-point field goal percentage	FT%	Free throw percentage
RPG	Rebounds per game	APG	Assists per game	SPG	Steals per game
BPG	Blocks per game	PPG	Points per game	**Bold**	Career high

=== NBA ===
==== Regular season ====
Year	Team	GP	MPG	FG%	FT%	RPG	APG	SPG	BPG	PPG
1973–74	Seattle	13	13.4	.241	.429	2.8	.3	.3	.2	1.3
