= NetDynamics Application Server =

Java based application server

- Developer: NetDynamics Inc.
- Operating system: Cross-platform
- Type: Application server
- License: Proprietary

NetDynamics Application Server was an early Java-based integrated software platform. The product was developed by NetDynamics, a Silicon Valley start-up company founded in 1995 by Zack Rinat and Ofer Ben-Shachar. Unlike other early application server competitors, NetDynamics chose Java as the development language for the platform.

As Java became the dominant development language for web-based applications, NetDynamics experienced significant revenue growth in 1997 and 1998. However, the product soon encountered problems due to the relative immaturity of Java and the rush to release new product versions in a rapidly changing marketplace. Believing that the new JDBC API was too immature, NetDynamics created a proprietary database development API based on a product from Rogue Wave Software.

NetDynamics, Inc. was acquired by Sun Microsystems in July 1998. The application server software, together with the Netscape Application Server, was the basis for Sun's iPlanet Application Server offering.

== Competition ==
NetDynamics initially competed against Bluestone, an application server based on the C Programming Language, and the Kiva application server. By mid-1998, a new competitor, WebLogic, Inc., released a Java application server that was compliant with JDBC and another emerging standard, JavaBeans. WebLogic Application Server eventually won out in the marketplace. The explosive growth of the application server business caught the attention of larger information technology companies. By 1998, the early application server start-up companies were all acquired: Hewlett-Packard purchased Bluestone, Sun Microsystems acquired NetDynamics, Netscape Communications Corporation bought out Kiva, and Weblogic was acquired by BEA Systems. Only Weblogic continues to survive as a product; Oracle Corporation acquired BEA in 2008, and the product was renamed Oracle Weblogic.

== See also ==
- iPlanet
- Comparison of application servers
