= Hummer Winblad Venture Partners =

American software and web-focused venture capital firm

- Company type: Private
- Industry: Venture capital
- Founded: 1989; 37 years ago
- Founders: Ann Winblad; John Hummer
- Headquarters: San Francisco, U.S.
- Products: Investments
- Website: hwvp.com

Hummer Winblad Venture Partners (HWVP) is an American software and web focused venture capital firm based in San Francisco, California. Its founders include John Hummer and Ann Winblad. The firm was an early investor in Napster, the first popular file sharing service, and in several internet firms that failed during the dot-com bubble.

== History ==
=== First decade (1989–1999) ===
Ann Winblad started Hummer Winblad Venture Partners with former professional basketball player John Hummer after selling her company Open Systems and serving as a consultant to Microsoft, Apple Computer, and IBM. The company originally focused on raising money from pension funds and investing in software companies. In 1999 Bill Gates invested in the company's venture fund. In her book The Kingmakers, reporter Karen Southwick wrote that Hummer Winblad Venture Partners "may not be among the super tier of VC firms, but it certainly gets just about as much publicity."

=== Napster and the dot-com bubble (2000–2014) ===
In 2000 Hummer Winblad led a US$15 million round of funding for Napster while the internet company was being sued by the Recording Industry Association of America. The Economist noted that this investment was unusual for a company that previously had been "notably more risk-averse than most Silicon Valley rivals towards Internet investments." In 2001 several of the company's investments ended in company bankruptcies or closures, including Pets.com, Homes.com, eHow, and Rival Networks. In 2006 Hummer Winblad Venture Partners settled a lawsuit brought by EMI Group and Universal Music Group after Napster's bankruptcy.

=== Rebranding as HWVP (2015–) ===
In 2015 Hummer Winblad Venture Partners rebranded as HWVP. The next year, for the first time, it raised a fund without Ann Winblad or John Hummer listed among the general partners. As of 2019, its investments include Ace Metrix, Aria Systems, and NuoDB.
