= Ace Metrix =

- Company type: Private
- Industry: Advertising analytics
- Founded: June 2007
- Founder: JuYoung Lee and Steve Goldman
- Headquarters: El Segundo, California
- Key people: Peter Daboll CEO
- Products: Ace Metrix LIVE, Ace Metrix PRE, Ace Metrix TREND, Ace Metrix TARGET
- Website: www.acemetrix.com

Ace Metrix is an advertising analytics company based in El Segundo, CA. The company screens and scores video advertising based on a survey method which measures an advertisement's creative impact including that of persuasion, watchability and emotional factors.

== History ==
JuYoung Lee and Steve Goldman founded Ace Metrix in 2007. The company launched its ad measure service in June 2009. In May 2012, Ace Metrix raised $8 million. The funding was an extension of the company's Series C funding backed by WPP, Hummer Winblad Venture Partners, Leapfrog Ventures and Palomar Ventures. The funding round raised Ace Metrix's total funding to approximately $20 million.

=== Screening and scoring technology ===
Ace Metrix built a technology platform to get 500 viewers' answers to ten basic questions. These questions assess the key components of attention, likeability, desire, relevance, information, change, and watchability. These seven base-level performance markers are rolled up using a proprietary algorithm to produce an aggregate score for the ad known as the Ace Score. Ace Metrix also adds one open-ended question to elicit viewers' general comments, and two behavior questions. This qualitative data provides a window into the viewers' state of mind.

The Ace Score is on a 0-950 scale reflecting combined performance across seven key dimensions shown to impact ad performance. Ace Metrix collects verbatim feedback from viewers and mines these comments using natural-language-processing algorithms to generate scores of emotional sentiment, and funniness, among others. Each nationally televised ad and digital video ad is scored by 500 American consumers weighted to the United States census for age, gender and income.

As of October 2018, the company had compiled over 80,000 scored television and online video ads in its Ace Metrix LIVE platform, representing over 40 million consumer interactions and 25 million consumer verbatim comments.
