= Kennedy McIntosh =

American basketball player (1949–2009)

Personal information
- Born: January 21, 1949 Detroit, Michigan, U.S.
- Died: March 6, 2009 (aged 60) Los Angeles, California, U.S.
- Listed height: 6 ft 7 in (2.01 m)
- Listed weight: 225 lb (102 kg)

Career information
- High school: South Haven (South Haven, Michigan)
- College: Eastern Michigan (1967–1971)
- NBA draft: 1971: 1st round, 15th overall pick
- Drafted by: Chicago Bulls
- Playing career: 1971–1974
- Position: Power forward
- Number: 40, 43

Career history
- 1971–1972: Chicago Bulls
- 1972–1974: Seattle SuperSonics

Career highlights
- No. 54 retired by Eastern Michigan Eagles
- Stats at NBA.com
- Stats at Basketball Reference

Kennedy McIntosh (January 21, 1949 – March 6, 2009) was an American professional basketball player whose NBA career lasted from 1971 to 1975. At 6'7" tall, he played the forward position.

== Career ==
Though born in Detroit, McIntosh attended high school on Michigan's western half, playing basketball at South Haven High School in South Haven. McIntosh went to college at Eastern Michigan University, where he scored 2,219 points and grabbed 1,426 rebounds. He was then drafted in the first round (15th pick) of the 1971 NBA draft by the Chicago Bulls.

McIntosh played with the Bulls until October 1972, when he was traded to the Seattle SuperSonics for Gar Heard and a draft pick. He spent the rest of his career with Seattle, retiring in 1975 because of injury. Over his NBA career, McIntosh averaged 5.3 points and 3.9 rebounds per game.

McIntosh's number 54 jersey was retired by Eastern Michigan University in 2006.

== Death ==
McIntosh died of a stroke at UCLA-Santa Monica Hospital, Los Angeles on March 6, 2009, aged 60.

== Career statistics ==
Legend
GP	Games played	GS	Games started	MPG	Minutes per game
FG%	Field goal percentage	3P%	3-point field goal percentage	FT%	Free throw percentage
RPG	Rebounds per game	APG	Assists per game	SPG	Steals per game
BPG	Blocks per game	PPG	Points per game	**Bold**	Career high

=== NBA ===
==== Regular season ====
Year	Team	GP	GS	MPG	FG%	FT%	RPG	APG	SPG	BPG	PPG
1971–72	Chicago	43	**4**	9.4	.339	.477	2.1	.4			3.1
1972–73	Chicago	3	0	11.0	**.615**	.000	3.0	.3			5.3
1972–73	Seattle	56		19.7	.326	.615	4.0	.9			4.5
1973–74	Seattle	**69**		**29.8**	.389	.607	**5.2**	**1.4**	**.8**	.4	**7.4**
1974–75	Seattle	6		16.8	.207	.667	2.5	1.2	.7	**.5**	3.0
Career		177	4	20.9	.361	.581	3.9	1.0	.7	.4	5.3
