= Milt Williams =

American basketball player (born 1945)

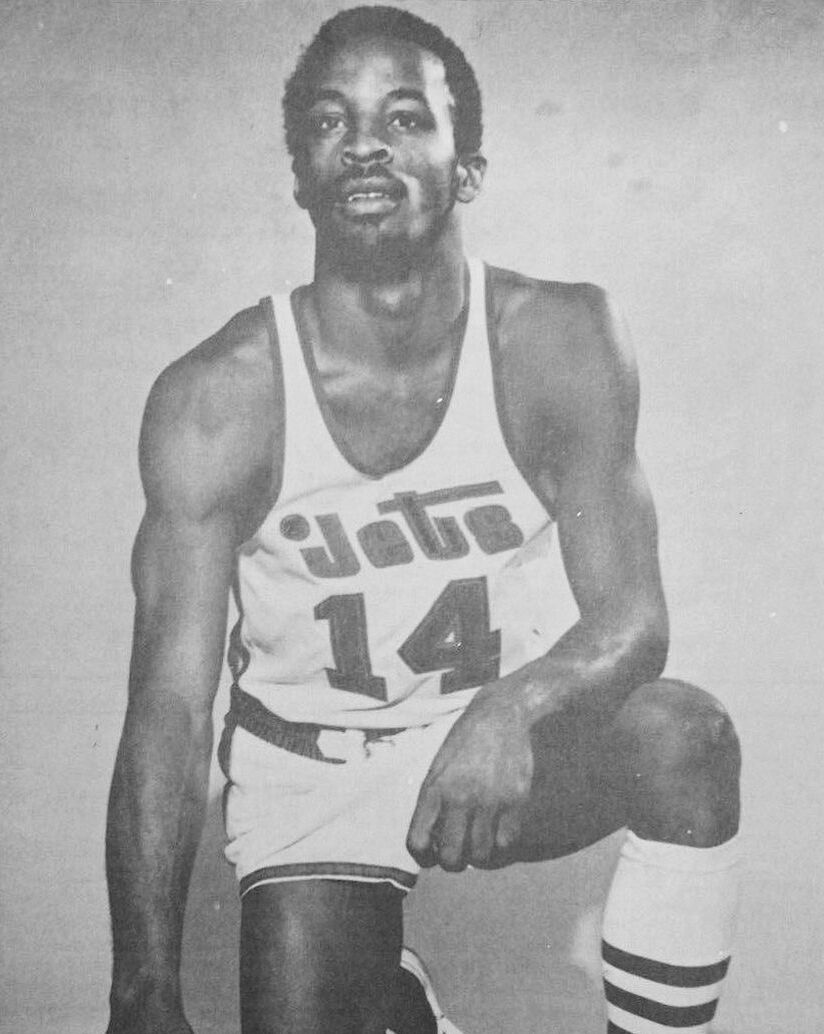
- Williams with the Allentown Jets in 1971

Personal information
- Born: November 22, 1945 (age 80) Seattle, Washington, U.S.
- Listed height: 6 ft 2 in (1.88 m)
- Listed weight: 182 lb (83 kg)

Career information
- College: Lincoln (Missouri) (1964–1968)
- NBA draft: 1968: 17th round, 202nd overall pick
- Drafted by: New York Knicks
- Playing career: 1969–1977
- Position: Point guard
- Number: 25, 11, 12, 10

Career history
- 1969–1970: Allentown Jets
- 1970: New York Knicks
- 1971: Atlanta Hawks
- 1971–1972: Trenton Pat Pavers
- 1972–1973: Allentown Jets
- 1973–1974: Seattle SuperSonics
- 1974: Spirits of St. Louis
- 1976–1977: Wilkes-Barre Barons

Career highlights
- EPBL champion (1970)
- Stats at NBA.com
- Stats at Basketball Reference

Milton Williams (born November 22, 1945) is a retired American professional basketball point guard who spent three seasons in the National Basketball Association (NBA) and one season in the American Basketball Association (ABA). In the NBA, he played for the New York Knicks (1970–71), the Atlanta Hawks (1971–72) and the Seattle SuperSonics (1973–74). During his tenure in the ABA, Williams played for the Spirits of St. Louis during the 1974–75 season. Born in Seattle, Washington, he attended the Lincoln University of Missouri where he was drafted in the 17^{th} round of the 1968 NBA draft by the Knicks.

Williams played in the Eastern Professional Basketball League (EPBL) / Eastern Basketball Association (EBA) for the Allentown Jets, Trenton Pat Pavers and Wilkes-Barre Barons.

== Career statistics ==
Legend
GP	Games played	GS	Games started	MPG	Minutes per game
FG%	Field goal percentage	3P%	3-point field goal percentage	FT%	Free throw percentage
RPG	Rebounds per game	APG	Assists per game	SPG	Steals per game
BPG	Blocks per game	PPG	Points per game	**Bold**	Career high

=== NBA/ABA ===
==== Regular season ====
Year	Team	GP	GS	MPG	FG%	3P%	FT%	RPG	APG	SPG	BPG	PPG
1970–71	New York (NBA)	5	0	2.6	**1.000**		.667	.0	.4			.8
1971–72	Atlanta (NBA)	10		12.7	.434		**.724**	.4	2.0			**6.7**
1973–74	Seattle (NBA)	**53**		9.5	.416		.651	.9	1.9	.5	.0	3.1
1974–75	St. Louis (ABA)	4		**23.8**	.579	–	–	**3.3**	**3.0**	**2.5**	.0	5.5
Career (NBA)		68	0	9.5	.424		.674	.8	1.8	.5	.0	3.5
Career (overall)		72	0	10.3	.437	–	.674	.9	1.9	.6	.0	3.6
