= CADO Systems =

American computer and software manufacturer

- Company type: Private
- Industry: Computers
- Founded: 1976; 49 years ago in Torrance, California
- Defunct: 1983
- Fate: Acquired by Contel Business Systems

CADO Systems was a minicomputer and software manufacturer in 1976. In 1983 was acquired by Contel Business Systems. In 1989, Contel Business Systems merged with NDS and became VERSYSS. CADO was formed by former staff of McDonnell-Douglas Information Systems. CADO was based in Torrance, California and had a manufacturing plant and systems software engineering team in Cork, Ireland.

== Business model ==
Contel and CADO focused their marketing on vertical markets. The computers and operating systems were tailored to rapid development and deployment of market-specific applications for small businesses, including:

- Finance (General Ledger, Accounts Receivable, Accounts Payable)
- Wholesale distribution (Inventory, Point of Sales, Sales Analysis)
- Travel (Ticketing, Passenger Management)
- Medical (Billing, Patient Records)

CADO Systems was one of the first manufacturer of Intel microcomputer-based business system with disk drives, application software, a compiler for the proprietary (BASIC-like) interpreted language "CADOL". The first prototype used an 8008 and sprang to life in 1973. By 1975, CADO was selling computers.

The first systems built were the 8080 "/1" systems with 3 KB of main memory and an 8-inch floppy drive. They could handle one serial port connected to one CRT-based terminal with keyboard - one user.

By the late 1970s, these had grown into the /4 systems with 16, 32 and later 48 KB of memory. These multitasked by using a hardware tick to XOR the base address of where the native ("CADOL" a BASIC-like interpreter) took instructions from. These also used Intel 8085 processors. The memory switching trick was done with proprietary hardware. The "/4" system had four serial ports, therefore four terminals, therefore four users. They could also be connected to modems instead and spoke various protocols such as X.25.

The /8 was two /4s sharing a common hard disk drive. It was effectively an eight-user system built out of two 8085 CPUs.

Around the time of the /8, development the CADO CAT computer came into being. It looked like a fruit-coloured iMac, but it was 20 years earlier. It had an integrated CRT and disk drives, which by that time (1981) had been shrunk to 5 inches (13 cm) wide and could fit inside the CRT enclosure. Earlier CADO computers used external hard drives, all of which were quite large.

The CAT product line consisted of:

- CAT I
- CAT II
- CAT III

The CAT III was a three-user system. The primary user sat at the CAT III system console, which contained the CPU, floppy drive, and hard disk. Other users connected to the system by way of serial terminals. By the end of the CAT series, over 25,000 systems and 200,000 terminals were manufactured.

The terminals were proprietary also: they were similar to standard VT terminals, but with custom firmware programming to support input commands (protected fields).

All CADO systems up to that point had the system and CADOL interpreter reside in EPROM, so as soon as power was applied it read track 0 sector 0 of the diskette and began executing CADOL code. The IL codes for the interpreter written by Jim Ferguson looked similar to Tannenbaum's optimized IL codes from his empirical study. The language was extended by Richard Sexton, who added Pascal-/C-like syntax and 65 KB instead of 256 byte program overlay sizes. Previous to that, CADOL worked in programs no longer than 256 bytes of IL code long and when the programmers had code that hit about the 200-byte mark they would have to issue a LOAD statement to load the next 256 bytes of CADOL IL codes. At some point when a fair number of applications had been written, the loading of overlays was made transparent by Sexton's modifications to the interpreter up to an apparent program of 65 KB. Dan Lanham rewrote the compiler. This was all done in Intel 8085 assembly.

After the /8, the technical staff wanted to gang more of these machines together, but the marketing department demanded 16-bit systems. The Motorola 68000 was the preferred choice of software people, but Bob Thorne, VP of hardware, delivered the news: Motorola only had a great CPU while Intel had a CPU and chipset family of CTCs, interrupt controllers, serial ports, DMA controllers and x86 became the industry standard, much to the disappointment of the software staff, who thought Thorne should just build all those bits he didn't have. Instead, Bob was working on two disk controllers as these were not off the shelf chips quite yet. One design was based on 8x300 bipolar parts but it never saw the light of day.

The 16-bit Intel 8086 Tiger systems began development in Intel development systems as there were no working commercial 8086-based computers at the time.

The Tiger was radically different. All previous CADO computers had been single-board systems that would probably be familiar to anybody who has ever seen a modern motherboard; the parts were just bigger, and there were fewer of them. But the Tiger looked more like a DEC computer - it had a Multibus backplane that would hold up to 10 plug-in cards into this mainframe, and was one of if not the first multi-microprocessor based mainframe systems.

There were three plug-in cards: the "terminal" card had an 8086 chip and 16 serial ports, the "cpu" card had the (8086) CPU that ran CADOL III and an optional disk processor used an Intel 8089. One had to have one cpu card, one terminal card although you could have many of these in increments of 16 serial ports, later also in increments of 8 ports.

With the 8086 came the net and around 1984 or 1986 CADO connected to the UUCP-based Usenet news and mail networks and finally had a UNIX system, requisitioned to run mail and news which engineering considered vital while the rest of the company had no idea what it was.

Before the first Tiger was sold though, George Ryan, the founder of the company, left and the IBM PC came out. This was, in many ways, the end of CADO. At one time one of the fastest-growing companies in California, CADO was then sold to/merged with Contel.

In 1983, Contel introduced the Tiger ATS line of computers. These consisted of:

- Tiger 8
- Tiger 16
- Tiger 32
- Tiger 64

The numbers designated how many users could connect to the machine at once. The chassis size ranged from a little larger than a breadbox (Tiger 8) to the size of a small household refrigerator (Tiger 64). The Tiger 32 and Tiger 64 models used multiple 8086 and 8089 processors to manage user requests.

In 1989, VERSYSS introduced the VERSYSS/Solution 1 line of computers. These differed dramatically from earlier systems. Instead of a completely proprietary hardware solution and operating systems, these were based on commodity components. The operating system was a variant of AT&T's SYSVR3. To provide backward-compatibility with older applications, the older MMOS was run on proprietary boards connected to the system bus. Thus, users were completely unaware that they were using a Unix system.

- VS/1 model 150
- VS/1 model 250
- VS/1 model 500

In 1993, VERSYSS partnered with IBM to port their MMOS to the RS/6000 line of systems. At that point, almost all proprietary hardware requirements were dropped except the terminal firmware.

Louis Thompson is now the only legible source for CADO as he owns the original deeds to all systems and all information about these systems.

== Other Products ==
In 1985, Contel produced the CADOS emulator to run CADO software on standard IBM PC hardware.
