= John Hummer =

American basketball player (born 1948)

Personal information
- Born: May 4, 1948 (age 78) Washington, D.C., U.S.
- Listed height: 6 ft 9 in (2.06 m)
- Listed weight: 230 lb (104 kg)

Career information
- High school: Washington-Lee (Arlington County, Virginia)
- College: Princeton (1967–1970)
- NBA draft: 1970: 1st round, 15th overall pick
- Drafted by: Buffalo Braves
- Playing career: 1970–1976
- Position: Power forward / center
- Number: 45, 42, 14

Career history
- 1970–1973: Buffalo Braves
- 1973–1974: Chicago Bulls
- 1974–1976: Seattle SuperSonics

Career highlights
- 2× First-team All-Ivy League (1969, 1970); Second-team All-Ivy League (1968)

Career NBA statistics
- Points: 2,248 (6.3 ppg)
- Rebounds: 1,733 (5.9 rpg)
- Assists: 543 (1.7 apg)
- Stats at NBA.com
- Stats at Basketball Reference

John R. Hummer (born May 4, 1948) is an American venture capitalist and retired professional basketball player who was an original member of the Buffalo Braves after starring for the Princeton Tigers men's basketball team. He also led his high school to the 1966 Virginia State 1A championship and helped Princeton earn a 1967–68 co-Ivy League Championship as well as a 1968–69 outright Ivy League Championship. Over the course of his basketball career, he was coached by four National Basketball Hall of Fame members.

In college, Hummer was a three-time All-Ivy League selection (first-team: 1969 and 1970, second team: 1968). He played for two Ivy League champion teams and served as team captain as a senior. He was a part of the first of head coach Pete Carril's thirteen Ivy League champions (1968), eleven NCAA Division I men's basketball tournament teams (1969) and three undefeated conference champions (1969). Although Hummer set no statistical records, his name continues to be ranked high in the Princeton record book by many statistical measures.

He played six seasons in the National Basketball Association (NBA) for the Braves, Chicago Bulls and Seattle SuperSonics. He was the 15th overall selection in the 1970 NBA draft and the first draft choice in the history of the Braves franchise. As a Braves draft choice, he was a somewhat controversial pick in a draft year with two All-American local products available. During his NBA career, he played for Hall of Famers Dolph Schayes, Bill Russell and Jack Ramsay.

After his professional basketball career ended, he went to Stanford University to get an MBA in 1980. In 1989, Ann Winblad and he founded Hummer Winblad Venture Partners, a venture capital firm focusing on software companies.

== Amateur career ==
Hummer attended Washington-Lee High School in Arlington, Virginia. Following in the footsteps of his brother Ed Hummer, he led W-L to the 1966 Virginia 1A state title as a high school senior. Ed had led the team to the 1962 and 1963 titles. His nephew (Ed's son Ian) was a freshman on the 2009–10 Princeton team.

In Hummer's sophomore season at Princeton, the team was co-champion of the Ivy League with a 20–6 (12–3 Ivy) record. Despite the fact that Princeton had three of the five first-team All-Ivy team members, plus second-team member Hummer, they lost the one-game league playoff to the Jim McMillian-led 1968 Columbia Lions. That year the team rose to as high as 8th in the AP Poll. This was the first of thirteen Ivy League championships for head coach Pete Carril.

The following season, the team accumulated a 19–7 (14–0) record and participated in the 1969 NCAA Division I men's basketball tournament. They lost to St. John's in the tournament, but Hummer was joined by Geoff Petrie on the first-team All-Ivy squad. This was the first of eleven NCAA tournament appearance for Carril. It was also the first of three 14–0 conference champions for Carril.

As a senior, Hummer was first-team All-Ivy, but the Tigers placed third in the conference to the undefeated (in Ivy League games) Corky Calhoun-led Penn Quakers and McMillian's Lions. Although Princeton did not appear in the 1970 NCAA Division I men's basketball tournament, they hosted Penn's game. All three of his varsity years were spent under Carril. Again, following in the footsteps of his brother who had served as Princeton captain of the 1966–67 team, John was co-captain for the 1969–70 team along with classmate Petrie. Hummer was honored with the team's B. Franklin Bunn ’07 Award for play, sportsmanship and influence that contributed most to the sport.

During his career, he shared the spotlight with Petrie and did not set any statistical records at a school and conference where Bill Bradley continues to dominate the record books. Over the course of his career, Hummer was the 9th Tiger to accumulate 1000 career points (1031 in 67 games) and he continued to rank seventh in school history with a 15.4 points/game average through the 2009–10 season. Since his career ended in 1970 only Brian Taylor has posted a higher average. He stands eighth in career free throws made (297), having only been passed since his career ended by Craig Robinson and Kit Mueller. He is tenth in career rebounds.

== Professional basketball career ==
Following his senior season, Hummer was one of three first-round Ivy League selections in the 1970 NBA Draft (Petrie – 8th, McMillian 13th and Hummer 15th). Hummer was also drafted by The Floridians in the 1970 American Basketball Association draft. The 1970 draft included two promising All-American local-Buffalo area talents: St. Bonaventure University's Buffalo-born Bob Lanier and Niagara University's Calvin Murphy. Murphy was a fan favorite that many local fans hoped the Braves would select. However, Braves General Manager Eddie Donovan doubted the 5 feet 9 inches (1.75 m) Murphy could make it in the NBA. The Baltimore Bullets traded to improve their draft position on the day of the March 23, 1970 NBA draft. They traded their #15 selection and Mike Davis to the expansion Buffalo Braves for the #9 selection. That day, the Braves selected Hummer with the 15th pick. Hummer averaged 11.3 points and 8.9 rebounds for the 1970–71 Buffalo Braves during an average of 32.6 minutes in 81 games played for coach Dolph Schayes. The 22–60 Braves finished fourth in the four-team Atlantic Division. Hummer and the Braves struggled for two more seasons with 60-loss seasons. The 1972–73 Braves were Jack Ramsay's first coaching season with his second NBA team.

After the Braves selected Ernie DiGregorio in the 1973 NBA draft to complement 1972 NBA draft selection Bob McAdoo, it was clear the team was going to change to fast-paced offense to leverage DiGregorio's skills. Hummer was more of a defensive player. Prior to the 1973–74 NBA season, Hummer was packaged with a 1974 NBA draft 2nd round pick and a 1975 NBA draft 2nd round pick in a trade that sent him to the Chicago Bulls in exchange for Gar Heard and Kevin Kunnert. The deal was part of the resume that earned Donavan the NBA Executive of the Year Award. That season the 54–28 Dick Motta-coached 1973–74 Bulls team that he was traded to initially would make the playoffs, but the 36–46 Bill Russell-coached 1973–74 SuperSonics that he would finish the season with would not.

During the season (on January 7), he was traded by the Bulls to the Seattle SuperSonics in exchange for a 1975 NBA draft 2nd round selection. Russell's SuperSonics (1974–75 and 1975–76) were the only playoff teams for whom he played in the postseason. In the 1975 NBA Playoffs, the Sonics defeated the Detroit Pistons 2–1 in the first round before losing to the Golden State Warriors 4–2. Hummer appeared in six of the nine playoff games that year, but accumulated no points. The following season the Sonics earned a bye in the first round of the 1976 NBA Playoffs where they lost to the Phoenix Suns. Hummer appeared in three of these games.

Never a strong free throw shooter, Hummer failed to make 50% of his free throws during his last three seasons in the NBA. In the 1974–75 season, he shot an unusually low 0.275 from the free throw line.

== Education ==
Hummer graduated from Princeton University in 1970 with an A.B. in English and in 1980 with an MBA from Stanford Graduate School of Business.

== Venture capitalism ==
In 1989 Ann Winblad and Hummer founded Hummer Winblad Venture Partners, which claims to have been the first venture capital firm to focus exclusively on the Software industry.

The company has financed over 100 ventures that have been on the forefront of trends that have gone from personal computer (PC) software to enterprise computing to Internet applications. The company's investments have now spanned generations of software applications, architectures, delivery methods, and business models, including Omniture, Voltage Security, MuleSoft, Wind River Systems and Hyperion Solutions.

Other notable companies that Hummer Winblad Venture Partners did provide venture capital for, that no longer exist, are Napster, Pets.com, and HomeGrocer.

== Career statistics ==
Legend
GP	Games played	GS	Games started	MPG	Minutes per game
FG%	Field goal percentage	3P%	3-point field goal percentage	FT%	Free throw percentage
RPG	Rebounds per game	APG	Assists per game	SPG	Steals per game
BPG	Blocks per game	PPG	Points per game	**Bold**	Career high

=== NBA ===
==== Regular season ====
Year	Team	GP	GS	MPG	FG%	FT%	RPG	APG	SPG	BPG	PPG
1970–71	Buffalo	**81**		**32.6**	.444	**.580**	**8.9**	2.0			**11.3**
1971–72	Buffalo	55		21.6	.390	.468	4.2	1.3			5.3
1972–73	Buffalo	66		23.4	.444	.561	4.9	2.1			8.0
1973–74	Chicago	18	0	10.3	**.500**	.500	2.1	.7	.2	.1	3.3
1973–74	Seattle	35		26.7	.467	.469	7.0	**2.7**	**.7**	**.6**	8.2
1974–75	Seattle	43		13.2	.380	.275	2.4	.9	.2	.2	2.2
1975–76	Seattle	29		12.6	.478	.415	2.7	.9	.2	.3	2.8
Career		327	0	22.7	.438	.524	5.3	1.7	.3	.3	6.9

==== Playoffs ====
Year	Team	GP	MPG	FG%	FT%	RPG	APG	SPG	BPG	PPG
1975	Seattle	**6**	**11.3**	.000	–	**1.5**	**.7**	**.3**	.0	.0
1976	Seattle	3	5.3	**.667**	–	.3	.0	.0	.0	**1.3**
Career		9	9.3	.200	–	1.1	.4	.2	.0	.4
