= Dick Gibbs (basketball) =

American basketball player (born 1948)

Personal information
- Born: December 20, 1948 (age 77) Ames, Iowa, U.S.
- Listed height: 6 ft 5 in (1.96 m)
- Listed weight: 210 lb (95 kg)

Career information
- High school: Ames (Ames, Iowa)
- College: Southeastern CC (1967–1969); UTEP (1969–1971)
- NBA draft: 1971: 3rd round, 49th overall pick
- Drafted by: Chicago Bulls
- Playing career: 1971–1976
- Position: Small forward
- Number: 40, 31, 21

Career history
- 1971–1972: Houston Rockets
- 1973: Kansas City–Omaha Kings
- 1973–1974: Seattle SuperSonics
- 1974–1975: Washington Bullets
- 1975–1976: Buffalo Braves

Career highlights
- First-team All-WAC (1971)

Career NBA statistics
- Points: 1,739 (5.2 ppg)
- Rebounds: 624 (1.9 rpg)
- Assists: 260 (0.8 apg)
- Stats at NBA.com
- Stats at Basketball Reference

Dick Gibbs (born December 20, 1948) is an American former professional basketball player. A small forward, he played in the National Basketball Association (NBA) for five teams from 1971 to 1976, posting career averages of 5.2 points per game and 1.9 rebounds per game.

Born in Ames, Iowa, Gibbs attended Ames High School and played on their basketball team in 1967, helping them reach the state championship game. Following a period at Burlington Junior College, he played college basketball for the University of Texas at El Paso Miners from 1969 to 1971. Gibbs scored 10.5 points per game in the 1969–70 season, when the Miners won the Western Athletic Conference championship in their first season in the league. In the last game of the regular season, Gibbs sustained an injury and was unable to play in the NCAA Tournament; the Miners lost in the first round. Their coach, Don Haskins, later said, "Without him, we had no chance to go very far in the tournament."

Gibbs improved his scoring average to 17.4 points per game in 1970–71, and his 10.6 rebounds per game were up from the 8.5 he had averaged the previous season. Both totals were team highs. At the end of the season, he was named to the All-Western Athletic Conference team. As of 2012, he was fourth in Miners history with 9.7 rebounds per game for his career.

In the third round of the 1971 NBA draft, Gibbs was selected by the Chicago Bulls with the 49th overall pick. Although the New York Nets picked him in the fourth round of the American Basketball Association draft, he opted to play in the NBA. He was traded to the Houston Rockets in June 1971, the first of five trades he was involved in during his career. After playing the 1971–72 season with the Rockets, Gibbs was on four other teams over the next four seasons—the Kansas City–Omaha Kings, Seattle SuperSonics, Washington Bullets, and Buffalo Braves. With the SuperSonics in 1973–74, he posted a career-high of 10.8 points per game. He was dealt along with a 1975 third-round selection from the SuperSonics to the Bullets for Archie Clark on August 19, 1974. The next season, he was a member of the Bullets team that reached the 1975 NBA Finals. Following his playing career, Gibbs ran a drug treatment facility in Newport Beach, California.

== Career statistics ==
Legend
GP	Games played	GS	Games started	MPG	Minutes per game
FG%	Field goal percentage	3P%	3-point field goal percentage	FT%	Free throw percentage
RPG	Rebounds per game	APG	Assists per game	SPG	Steals per game
BPG	Blocks per game	PPG	Points per game	**Bold**	Career high

=== NBA ===
==== Regular season ====
Year	Team	GP	MPG	FG%	FT%	RPG	APG	SPG	BPG	PPG
1971–72	Houston	64	11.8	.340	**.833**	2.2	.8			3.7
1972–73	Houston	1	2.0	.000	–	.0	1.0			.0
1972–73	Kansas City–Omaha	66	11.1	.362	.746	1.4	.9			3.1
1973–74	Seattle	71	**21.5**	**.431**	.806	**3.1**	**1.1**	**.5**	**.3**	**10.8**
1974–75	Washington	59	7.2	.389	.750	1.0	.3	.2	.1	3.3
1975–76	Buffalo	**72**	12.0	.429	.828	1.5	.7	.2	.2	4.7
Career		333	12.9	.402	.799	1.9	.8	.3	.2	5.2

==== Playoffs ====
Year	Team	GP	MPG	FG%	FT%	RPG	APG	SPG	BPG	PPG
1975	Washington	**6**	2.8	.300	**1.000**	**.2**	.3	**.5**	.0	1.3
1976	Buffalo	5	**4.6**	**.444**	**1.000**	**.2**	**.4**	.0	.0	**2.0**
Career		11	3.6	.368	1.000	.2	.4	.3	.0	1.6
