= Chicago Bulls all-time roster =

Players in the Chicago Bulls, a National Basketball League franchise in the US

The following is a list of players, both past and current, who appeared at least in one game for the Chicago Bulls NBA franchise.

== Players ==
Note: Statistics are correct through the end of the 2025–26 season.

G	Guard	G/F	Guard-forward	F	Forward	F/C	Forward-center	C	Center

legend
^	Denotes player who has been inducted to the Naismith Memorial Basketball Hall of Fame
*	Denotes player who has been selected for at least one All-Star Game with the Chicago Bulls and is currently on the team roster
^{+}	Denotes player who has been selected for at least one All-Star Game with the Chicago Bulls
^{x}	Denotes player who is currently on the Chicago Bulls roster
0.0	Denotes the Chicago Bulls statistics leader (min. 100 games played for the team for per-game statistics)

=== A to B ===
All-time roster
Player	Pos.	Pre-draft team	Yrs	Seasons	Statistics									Ref.
Player	Pos.	Pre-draft team	Yrs	Seasons	GP	MP	REB	AST	PTS	MPG	RPG	APG	PPG	Ref.
Rick Adelman	G	Loyola Marymount	2	1973–1975	67	958	95	91	296	14.3	1.4	1.4	4.4	
Joe Alexander	F	West Virginia	1	2009–2010	8	29	5	2	4	3.6	0.6	0.3	0.5	
Rawle Alkins	G	Arizona	1	2018–2019	10	120	26	13	37	12.0	2.6	1.3	3.7	
Malik Allen	F/C	Villanova	2	2005–2007	114	1,339	259	36	508	11.7	2.3	0.3	4.5	
Al-Farouq Aminu	F	Wake Forest	1	2020–2021	6	67	19	2	9	11.2	3.2	0.3	1.5	
Lou Amundson	F/C	UNLV	2	2012–2014	2	3	1	0	0	1.5	0.5	0.0	0.0	
Chris Anstey	C	(Australia) South East Melbourne Magic	1	1999–2000	73	1,007	280	65	439	13.8	3.8	0.9	6.0	
Greg Anthony	G	UNLV	1	2001–2002	36	961	88	203	302	26.7	2.4	5.6	8.4	
Ryan Arcidiacono	G	Villanova	4	2017–2021	207	3,645	421	456	989	17.6	2.0	2.2	4.8	
Jim Ard	F/C	Cincinnati	1	1977–1978	14	116	32	7	18	8.3	2.3	0.5	1.3	
B. J. Armstrong^{+}	G	Iowa	7	1989–1995; 1999–2000	518	13,319	948	1,741	5,553	25.7	1.8	3.4	10.7	
Tate Armstrong	G	Duke	2	1977–1979	92	975	88	105	350	10.6	1.0	1.1	3.8	
Ron Artest	F	St. John's	3	1999–2002	175	5,424	733	507	2,194	31.0	4.2	2.9	12.5	
Ömer Aşık	C	(Turkey) Fenerbahçe	3	2010–2012; 2017–2018	152	2,021	666	65	438	13.3	4.4	0.4	2.9	
D. J. Augustin	G	Texas	1	2013–2014	61	1,857	126	303	909	30.4	2.1	5.0	14.9	
Dennis Awtrey	C	Santa Clara	3	1972–1974; 1979–1980	173	2,966	722	348	641	17.1	4.2	2.0	3.7	
Dalibor Bagarić	C	(Croatia) Benston Zagreb	3	2000–2003	95	973	238	37	251	10.2	2.5	0.4	2.6	
Cameron Bairstow	F/C	New Mexico	2	2014–2016	36	167	36	7	44	4.6	1.0	0.2	1.2	
Lonzo Ball	G	UCLA	2	2021–2022; 2024–2025	70	1,989	308	293	722	28.4	4.4	4.2	10.3	
Gene Banks	G/F	Duke	2	1985–1987	145	3,961	668	421	1,505	27.3	4.6	2.9	10.4	
Jim Barnes	F/C	UTEP	2	1967–1969	47	823	234	29	370	17.5	5.0	0.6	7.9	
Andre Barrett	G	Seton Hall	1	2006–2007	6	29	5	7	8	4.8	0.8	1.2	1.3	
Brent Barry	G	Oregon State	1	1998–1999	37	1,181	144	116	412	31.9	3.9	3.1	11.1	
Eddie Basden	G	Charlotte	1	2005–2006	19	141	28	8	39	7.4	1.5	0.4	2.1	
Johnny Baum	F	Temple	2	1969–1971	65	556	129	31	292	8.6	2.0	0.5	4.5	
Lonny Baxter	F	Maryland	2	2002–2004	69	829	200	21	322	12.0	2.9	0.3	4.7	
Marco Belinelli	G/F	(Italy) Fortitudo Bologna	1	2012–2013	73	1,882	140	148	702	25.8	1.9	2.0	9.6	
Jordan Bell	F/C	Oregon	1	2021–2022	1	2	1	0	0	2.0	1.0	0.0	0.0	
Leon Benbow	G	Jacksonville	2	1974–1976	115	1,838	214	183	628	16.0	1.9	1.6	5.5	
Corey Benjamin	G	Oregon State	3	1998–2001	144	2,039	228	133	795	14.2	1.6	0.9	5.5	
Mario Bennett	F	Arizona State	1	1998–1999	3	19	5	0	7	6.3	1.7	0.0	2.3	
Del Beshore	G	California (PA)	1	1979–1980	68	869	63	139	244	12.8	0.9	2.0	3.6	
Travis Best	G	Georgia Tech	1	2001–2002	30	793	81	149	279	26.4	2.7	5.0	9.3	
Patrick Beverley	G	Arkansas	1	2022–2023	22	605	107	76	127	27.5	4.9	3.5	5.8	
Onuralp Bitim	F	(Turkey) Frutti Extra Bursaspor	1	2023–2024	23	268	32	13	80	11.7	1.4	0.6	3.5	
Antonio Blakeney	G	LSU	2	2017–2019	76	1,143	139	62	569	15.0	1.8	0.8	7.5	
Ricky Blanton	F	LSU	1	1992–1993	2	13	3	1	6	6.5	1.5	0.5	3.0	
John Block	F/C	USC	2	1974–1976	52	889	216	44	409	17.1	4.2	0.8	7.9	
Corie Blount	F	Cincinnati	4	1993–1995; 2002–2004	231	3,171	845	211	793	13.7	3.7	0.9	3.4	
Ray Blume	G	Oregon State	1	1981–1982	49	546	41	68	226	11.1	0.8	1.4	4.6	
Tom Boerwinkle	C	Tennessee	10	1968–1978	635	14,387	5,745	2,007	4,596	22.7	9.0	3.2	7.2	
Keith Bogans	G/F	Kentucky	1	2010–2011	82	1,461	148	101	359	17.8	1.8	1.2	4.4	
Keith Booth	F	Maryland	2	1997–1999	45	449	97	39	130	10.0	2.2	0.9	2.9	
Bob Boozer^{+}	F	Kansas State	3	1966–1969	236	8,311	2,049	367	4,807	35.2	8.7	1.6	20.4	
Carlos Boozer	F/C	Duke	4	2010–2014	280	8,517	2,532	567	4,347	30.4	9.0	2.0	15.5	
Nate Bowman	C	Wichita State	1	1966–1967	9	65	28	2	22	7.2	3.1	0.2	2.4	
Dudley Bradley	G/F	North Carolina	1	1982–1983	58	683	105	106	201	11.8	1.8	1.8	3.5	
Tony Bradley	F/C	Oregon	2	2021–2023	67	582	197	28	182	8.7	2.9	0.4	2.7	
Elton Brand	F	Duke	2	1999–2001	155	5,905	1,556	395	3,117	38.1	10.0	2.5	20.1	
Mike Bratz	G	Stanford	1	1982–1983	15	140	19	23	39	9.3	1.3	1.5	2.6	
Ron Brewer	G	Arkansas	1	1985–1986	4	18	0	0	7	4.5	0.0	0.0	1.8	
Ronnie Brewer	G/F	Arkansas	3	2010–2012; 2013–2014	148	3,418	493	277	958	23.1	3.3	1.9	6.5	
Aaron Brooks	G	Oregon	2	2014–2016	151	2,993	267	441	1,445	19.8	1.8	2.9	9.6	
Devin Brown	G	UTSA	1	2009–2010	11	93	15	7	20	8.5	1.4	0.6	1.8	
John Brown	F	Missouri	1	1978–1979	77	1,265	238	104	388	16.4	3.1	1.4	5.0	
Mike Brown	F/C	George Washington	2	1986–1988	108	1,409	373	52	455	13.0	3.5	0.5	4.2	
P. J. Brown	F/C	Louisiana Tech	1	2006–2007	72	1,456	347	48	436	20.2	4.8	0.7	6.1	
Randy Brown	G	New Mexico State	5	1995–2000	309	5,639	547	708	1,535	18.2	1.8	2.3	5.0	
Roger Brown	C	Kansas	1	1979–1980	4	37	10	1	2	9.3	2.5	0.3	0.5	
Shannon Brown	G	Michigan State	1	2007–2008	6	22	2	0	9	3.7	0.3	0.0	1.5	
Tony Brown	G/F	Arkansas	1	1985–1986	10	132	16	14	45	13.2	1.6	1.4	4.5	
Troy Brown Jr.	G/F	Oregon	2	2020–2022	79	1,292	247	76	354	16.4	3.1	1.0	4.5	
Rick Brunson	G	Temple	2	2002–2004	54	598	56	116	174	11.1	1.0	2.1	3.2	
Mark Bryant	F/C	Seton Hall	1	1998–1999	45	1,204	232	48	407	26.8	5.2	1.1	9.0	
Wallace Bryant	C	San Francisco	1	1983–1984	29	317	80	13	118	10.9	2.8	0.4	4.1	
Jud Buechler	G/F	Arizona	4	1994–1998	281	2,656	412	215	832	9.5	1.5	0.8	3.0	
Roger Burkman	G	Louisville	1	1981–1982	6	30	6	5	5	5.0	1.0	0.8	0.8	
Jim Burns	G	Northwestern	1	1967–1968	3	11	2	1	4	3.7	0.7	0.3	1.3	
Scott Burrell	G/F	UConn	1	1997–1998	80	1,096	198	65	416	13.7	2.5	0.8	5.2	
Jimmy Butler^{+}	G/F	Marquette	6	2011–2017	399	12,880	1,921	1,254	6,208	32.3	4.8	3.1	15.6	
Rasual Butler	G/F	La Salle	1	2010–2011	6	26	1	0	16	4.3	0.2	0.0	2.7	
Matas Buzelis^{x}	F	Sunrise Christian (KS)	2	2024–2026	157	3,759	726	237	1,940	23.9	4.6	1.5	12.4	

=== C to D ===
All-time roster
Player	Pos.	Pre-draft team	Yrs	Seasons	Statistics									Ref.
Player	Pos.	Pre-draft team	Yrs	Seasons	GP	MP	REB	AST	PTS	MPG	RPG	APG	PPG	Ref.
Jason Caffey	F	Alabama	3	1995–1998	183	2,660	585	149	999	14.5	3.2	0.8	5.5	
Isaiah Canaan	G	Murray State	1	2016–2017	39	592	50	37	181	15.2	1.3	0.9	4.6	
Chris Carr	G	Southern Illinois	1	1999–2000	50	1,092	160	81	492	21.8	3.2	1.6	9.8	
Cory Carr	G	Texas Tech	1	1998–1999	42	624	49	66	171	14.9	1.2	1.6	4.1	
Jevon Carter	G	West Virginia	3	2023–2026	131	1,579	125	153	634	12.1	1.0	1.2	4.8	
Wendell Carter Jr.	C	Duke	3	2018–2021	119	3,158	962	198	1,287	26.5	8.1	1.7	10.8	
Michael Carter-Williams	G	Syracuse	1	2016–2017	45	846	153	113	297	18.8	3.4	2.5	6.6	
Bill Cartwright	C	San Francisco	6	1988–1994	397	10,270	2,181	588	3,638	25.9	5.5	1.5	9.2	
Alex Caruso	G	Texas A&M	3	2021–2024	179	4,762	617	605	1,393	26.6	3.4	3.4	7.8	
Tyson Chandler	C	Manuel Dominguez HS (CA)	5	2001–2006	340	8,308	2,616	299	2,397	24.4	7.7	0.9	7.1	
Len Chappell	F/C	Wake Forest	1	1966–1967	19	179	38	12	94	9.4	2.0	0.6	4.9	
Barry Clemens	F	Ohio Wesleyan	3	1966–1969	213	4,061	894	262	1,717	19.1	4.2	1.2	8.1	
Fred Cofield	G	Eastern Michigan	1	1986–1987	5	27	5	4	4	5.4	1.0	0.8	0.8	
Jimmy Collins	G	New Mexico State	2	1970–1972	74	612	66	70	281	8.3	0.9	0.9	3.8	
Zach Collins^{x}	F/C	Gonzaga	2	2024–2026	38	736	243	74	337	19.4	6.4	1.9	8.9	
Steve Colter	G	New Mexico State	1	1986–1987	27	473	42	94	131	17.5	1.6	3.5	4.9	
Daequan Cook	G	Ohio State	1	2012–2013	33	276	43	9	82	8.4	1.3	0.3	2.5	
Tyler Cook	F	Iowa	1	2021–2022	20	200	53	3	67	10.0	2.7	0.2	3.4	
Dave Corzine	C	DePaul	7	1982–1989	556	15,039	3,529	1,112	5,457	27.0	6.3	2.0	9.8	
Joe Courtney	F	Southern Miss	1	1992–1993	5	34	2	1	11	6.8	0.4	0.2	2.2	
Torrey Craig	F	USC Upstate	2	2023–2025	62	1,162	242	63	365	18.7	3.9	1.0	5.9	
Jamal Crawford	G	Michigan	4	2000–2004	244	6,334	591	935	2,737	26.0	2.4	3.8	11.2	
Earl Cureton	F/C	Detroit Mercy	1	1986–1987	43	1,105	227	70	297	25.7	5.3	1.6	6.9	
Eddy Curry	C	Thornwood HS (IL)	4	2001–2005	289	6,683	1,414	167	3,414	23.1	4.9	0.6	11.8	
Quintin Dailey	G	San Francisco	4	1982–1986	272	7,354	771	792	4,473	27.0	2.8	2.9	16.4	
Kornél Dávid	F	(Hungary) Budapesti Honvéd	2	1998–2000	76	1,345	246	56	476	17.7	3.2	0.7	6.3	
Antonio Davis	F/C	UTEP	2	2003–2005	137	3,875	956	203	1,080	28.3	7.0	1.5	7.9	
Charles Davis	F	Vanderbilt	2	1988–1990	102	974	195	49	315	9.5	1.9	0.5	3.1	
Darren Daye	G/F	UCLA	1	1986–1987	1	7	1	1	0	7.0	1.0	1.0	0.0	
Luol Deng^{+}	F	Duke	10	2004–2014	637	22,882	4,078	1,572	10,286	35.9	6.4	2.5	16.1	
DeMar DeRozan^{+}	G/F	USC	3	2021–2024	229	8,414	1,075	1,172	5,831	36.7	4.7	5.1	25.5	
Derrek Dickey	F	Cincinnati	1	1977–1978	25	220	48	10	68	8.8	1.9	0.4	2.7	
Coby Dietrick	F/C	San Jose State	3	1979–1982	235	4,072	816	421	1,138	17.3	3.5	1.8	4.8	
Rob Dillingham^{x}	G	Kentucky	1	2025–2026	30	644	90	85	288	21.5	3.0	2.8	9.6	
Jackie Dinkins	F	Voorhees	1	1971–1972	18	89	20	7	45	4.9	1.1	0.4	2.5	
Ayo Dosunmu	G	Illinois	5	2021–2026	324	9,001	947	1,076	3,533	27.8	2.9	3.3	10.9	
Devon Dotson	G	Kansas	2	2020–2022	22	135	14	22	52	6.1	0.6	1.0	2.4	
Goran Dragić	G	(Slovenia) Union Olimpija	1	2022–2023	51	787	69	139	326	15.4	1.4	2.7	6.4	
Henri Drell	G/F	(Italy) Victoria Libertas Pesaro	1	2023–2024	4	30	4	4	11	7.5	1.0	1.0	2.8	
Bryce Drew	G	Valparaiso	1	2000–2001	48	1,305	69	185	302	27.2	1.4	3.9	6.3	
Andre Drummond	C	UConn	2	2022–2024	146	2,200	1,152	70	1,062	15.1	7.9	0.5	7.3	
Chris Duarte	G	Oregon	1	2024–2025	17	74	20	9	36	4.4	1.2	0.5	2.1	
Charles Dudley	G	Washington	1	1978–1979	43	684	86	116	118	15.9	2.0	2.7	2.7	
Chris Duhon	G	Duke	4	2004–2008	300	7,728	718	1,344	2,077	25.8	2.4	4.5	6.9	
Mike Dunleavy Jr.	G/F	Duke	3	2013–2016	176	5,125	676	339	1,746	29.1	3.8	1.9	9.9	
Kris Dunn	G	Providence	3	2017–2020	149	4,183	594	760	1,591	28.1	4.0	5.1	10.7	
Ronald Dupree	F	LSU	1	2003–2004	47	893	167	55	292	19.0	3.6	1.2	6.2	

=== E to G ===
All-time roster
Player	Pos.	Pre-draft team	Yrs	Seasons	Statistics									Ref.
Player	Pos.	Pre-draft team	Yrs	Seasons	GP	MP	REB	AST	PTS	MPG	RPG	APG	PPG	Ref.
Jarell Eddie	G/F	Virginia Tech	1	2017–2018	1	3	0	0	0	3.0	0.0	0.0	0.0	
James Edwards	F/C	Washington	1	1995–1996	28	274	40	11	98	9.8	1.4	0.4	3.5	
Khalid El-Amin	G	UConn	1	2000–2001	50	936	81	145	314	18.7	1.6	2.9	6.3	
Chris Engler	C	Wyoming	1	1984–1985	3	3	2	0	2	1.0	0.7	0.0	0.7	
Jo Jo English	G	South Carolina	3	1992–1995	50	577	54	46	179	11.5	1.1	0.9	3.6	
Keith Erickson	G/F	UCLA	2	1966–1968	154	3,711	762	386	1,535	24.1	4.9	2.5	10.0	
Noa Essengue^{x}	F	(Germany) Ratiopharm Ulm	1	2025–2026	2	6	0	0	0	3.0	0.0	0.0	0.0	
Kay Felder	G	Oakland	1	2017–2018	14	134	14	20	55	9.6	1.0	1.4	3.9	
Cristiano Felício	F/C	(Brazil) Flamengo	6	2015–2021	252	3,554	992	183	1,078	14.1	3.9	0.7	4.3	
Eric Fernsten	F/C	San Francisco	2	1975–1977	38	320	85	25	106	8.4	2.2	0.7	2.8	
Marcus Fizer	F	Iowa State	4	2000–2004	232	5,090	1,158	287	2,426	21.9	5.0	1.2	10.5	
Trentyn Flowers	F	(Australia) Adelaide 36ers	1	2025–2026	2	6	1	1	4	3.0	0.5	0.5	2.0	
Greg Foster	F/C	UTEP	1	1994–1995	17	299	54	16	104	17.6	3.2	0.9	6.1	
Jim Fox	F/C	South Carolina	2	1970–1972	92	1,761	652	202	859	19.1	7.1	2.2	9.3	
Jimmer Fredette	G	BYU	1	2013–2014	8	56	7	3	32	7.0	0.9	0.4	4.0	
Lawrence Funderburke	F	Ohio State	1	2004–2005	2	21	3	0	9	10.5	1.5	0.0	4.5	
Andrew Funk	G	Penn State	1	2023–2024	5	13	0	0	0	2.6	0.0	0.0	0.0	
Daniel Gafford	F/C	Arkansas	2	2019–2021	74	992	209	38	367	13.4	2.8	0.5	5.0	
Thomas Gardner	G	Missouri	1	2007–2008	4	45	4	1	21	11.3	1.0	0.3	5.3	
Rowland Garrett	F	Florida State	4	1972–1976	160	2,091	453	69	967	13.1	2.8	0.4	6.0	
Pau Gasol^{+}	F/C	(Spain) FC Barcelona	2	2014–2016	150	4,972	1,712	504	2,633	33.1	11.4	3.4	17.6	
George Gervin^	G/F	Eastern Michigan	1	1985–1986	82	2,065	215	144	1,325	25.2	2.6	1.8	16.2	
Taj Gibson	F	USC	8	2009–2017	562	14,170	3,586	564	5,280	25.2	6.4	1.0	9.4	
Josh Giddey^{x}	G	(Australia) Adelaide 36ers	2	2024–2026	124	3,848	1,014	997	1,941	31.0	8.2	8.0	15.7	
Kendall Gill	G	Illinois	1	2003–2004	56	1,411	190	89	539	25.2	3.4	1.6	9.6	
Artis Gilmore^	C	Jacksonville	7	1976–1982; 1987–1988	482	16,777	5,342	1,186	9,288	34.8	11.1	2.5	19.3	
Drew Gooden	F	Kansas	2	2007–2009	49	1,476	433	74	658	30.1	8.8	1.5	13.4	
Steve Goodrich	F	Princeton	1	2000–2001	12	133	21	6	19	11.1	1.8	0.5	1.6	
Ben Gordon	G	UConn	5	2004–2009	398	12,478	1,196	1,192	7,372	31.4	3.0	3.0	18.5	
Stephen Graham	G	Oklahoma State	1	2005–2006	3	20	3	1	5	6.7	1.0	0.3	1.7	
Horace Grant^{+}	F/C	Clemson	7	1987–1994	546	18,204	4,721	1,316	6,866	33.3	8.6	2.4	12.6	
Jerian Grant	G	Notre Dame	2	2016–2018	137	2,714	283	463	989	19.8	2.1	3.4	7.2	
Aaron Gray	C	Pittsburgh	3	2007–2010	125	1,378	404	89	476	11.0	3.2	0.7	3.8	
Javonte Green	G/F	Radford	4	2020–2024	122	2,357	450	94	784	19.3	3.7	0.8	6.4	
Sidney Green	F/C	UNLV	3	1983–1986	177	3,714	1,078	193	1,626	21.0	6.1	1.1	9.2	
David Greenwood	F/C	UCLA	6	1979–1985	464	15,011	4,222	1,030	5,824	32.4	9.1	2.2	12.6	
Adrian Griffin	G/F	Seton Hall	3	2004–2005; 2006–2008	145	1,474	292	134	339	10.2	2.0	0.9	2.3	
Mouhamadou Gueye	F	Pittsburgh	1	2025–2026	2	45	6	6	16	22.5	3.0	3.0	8.0	
Matt Guokas	G/F	Saint Joseph's	3	1970–1971; 1974–1976	178	4,575	312	548	1,182	25.7	1.8	3.1	6.6	
A. J. Guyton	G	Indiana	2	2000–2002	78	1,237	80	145	442	15.9	1.0	1.9	5.7	

=== H to I ===
All-time roster
Player	Pos.	Pre-draft team	Yrs	Seasons	Statistics									Ref.
Player	Pos.	Pre-draft team	Yrs	Seasons	GP	MP	REB	AST	PTS	MPG	RPG	APG	PPG	Ref.
Jack Haley	F/C	UCLA	3	1988–1990; 1995–1996	63	354	91	14	140	5.6	1.4	0.2	2.2	
Shaler Halimon	G/F	Utah State	2	1969–1971	40	540	70	73	243	13.5	1.8	1.8	6.1	
Richard Hamilton	G/F	UConn	2	2011–2013	78	1,785	149	203	816	22.9	1.9	2.6	10.5	
Bob Hansen	G	Iowa	1	1991–1992	66	769	73	68	165	11.7	1.1	1.0	2.5	
Glenn Hansen	G	LSU	1	1977–1978	2	4	0	0	0	2.0	0.0	0.0	0.0	
Reggie Harding	C	Martin Luther King HS (MI)	1	1967–1968	14	305	94	18	65	21.8	6.7	1.3	4.6	
Ron Harper	G/F	Miami (OH)	5	1994–1999	350	8,553	1,056	912	2,760	24.4	3.0	2.6	7.9	
Othella Harrington	F/C	Georgetown	2	2004–2006	142	2,095	446	95	908	14.8	3.1	0.7	6.4	
Shaquille Harrison	G	Tulsa	2	2018–2020	116	1,914	308	188	683	16.5	2.7	1.6	5.9	
Clem Haskins	G	Western Kentucky	3	1967–1970	237	7,565	964	1,095	3,703	31.9	4.1	4.6	15.6	
Trenton Hassell	G	Austin Peay	2	2001–2003	160	4,236	510	323	1,023	26.5	3.2	2.0	6.4	
Hersey Hawkins	G	Bradley	1	1999–2000	61	1,622	175	134	480	26.6	2.9	2.2	7.9	
Gar Heard	F	Oklahoma	1	1972–1973	78	1,535	447	58	807	19.7	5.7	0.7	10.3	
Bill Hewitt	F	USC	1	1974–1975	18	467	116	24	126	25.9	6.4	1.3	7.0	
Phil Hicks	F	Tulane	1	1976–1977	35	255	65	23	93	7.3	1.9	0.7	2.7	
Rod Higgins	F	Fresno State	4	1982–1986	233	4,796	726	369	1,679	20.6	3.1	1.6	7.2	
Malcolm Hill	F	Illinois	2	2021–2023	21	175	32	7	60	8.3	1.5	0.3	2.9	
Kirk Hinrich	G	Kansas	11	2003–2010; 2012–2016	748	23,545	2,281	3,811	8,536	31.5	3.0	5.1	11.4	
Craig Hodges	G	Long Beach State	4	1988–1992	241	3,565	203	399	1,497	14.8	0.8	1.7	6.2	
Fred Hoiberg	G	Iowa State	4	1999–2003	247	5,284	765	554	1,441	21.4	3.1	2.2	5.8	
Randy Holcomb	F	San Diego State	1	2005–2006	4	11	1	0	2	2.8	0.3	0.0	0.5	
Justin Holiday	F	Washington	3	2015–2016; 2017–2019	137	4,100	523	283	1,492	29.9	3.8	2.1	10.9	
Wilbur Holland	G	New Orleans	3	1976–1979	243	7,820	801	896	3,568	32.2	3.3	3.7	14.7	
A. W. Holt	F	Jackson State	1	1970–1971	6	14	4	0	4	2.3	0.7	0.0	0.7	
Michael Holton	G	UCLA	1	1985–1986	24	447	30	48	171	18.6	1.3	2.0	7.1	
Dennis Hopson	G/F	Ohio State	2	1990–1992	63	738	109	65	266	11.7	1.7	1.0	4.2	
Talen Horton-Tucker	G	Iowa State	1	2024–2025	58	724	100	83	379	12.5	1.7	1.4	6.5	
Kevin Huerter	G/F	Maryland	2	2024–2026	70	1,817	254	198	822	26.0	3.6	2.8	11.7	
Larry Hughes	G	Saint Louis	2	2007–2009	58	1,602	181	146	697	27.6	3.1	2.5	12.0	
John Hummer	F/C	Princeton	1	1973–1974	18	186	37	13	60	10.3	2.1	0.7	3.3	
Lindsey Hunter	G	Jackson State	2	2008–2010	41	388	26	46	86	9.5	0.6	1.1	2.1	
R. J. Hunter	G	Georgia State	1	2016–2017	3	9	1	0	0	3.0	0.3	0.0	0.0	
Chandler Hutchison	G	Boise State	3	2018–2021	79	1,486	313	64	460	18.8	4.0	0.8	5.8	

=== I to K ===
All-time roster
Player	Pos.	Pre-draft team	Yrs	Seasons	Statistics									Ref.
Player	Pos.	Pre-draft team	Yrs	Seasons	GP	MP	REB	AST	PTS	MPG	RPG	APG	PPG	Ref.
Jaden Ivey	G	Purdue	1	2025–2026	4	115	19	16	46	28.8	4.8	4.0	11.5	
Tracy Jackson	G/F	Notre Dame	2	1981–1983	116	1,721	230	127	662	14.8	2.0	1.1	5.7	
Mike James	G	Duquesne	2	2011–2012; 2013–2014	22	197	17	46	64	9.0	0.8	2.1	2.9	
Chris Jefferies	G/F	Fresno State	1	2003–2004	19	187	28	6	76	9.8	1.5	0.3	4.0	
Alize Johnson	F	Missouri State	1	2021–2022	16	121	36	8	28	7.6	2.3	0.5	1.8	
Dave Johnson	G/F	Syracuse	1	1993–1994	17	119	16	4	47	7.0	0.9	0.2	2.8	
James Johnson	F	Wake Forest	2	2009–2011	78	880	152	62	298	11.3	1.9	0.8	3.8	
Linton Johnson	F	Tulane	2	2003–2004; 2008–2009	49	776	191	29	182	15.8	3.9	0.6	3.7	
Mickey Johnson	F	Aurora	5	1974–1979	363	10,992	3,045	992	5,531	30.3	8.4	2.7	15.2	
Ollie Johnson	F	Temple	2	1978–1980	150	3,269	390	324	1,257	21.8	2.6	2.2	8.4	
Steve Johnson	F/C	Oregon State	2	1983–1985	105	2,253	603	82	1,033	21.5	5.7	0.8	9.8	
Anthony Jones	G/F	UNLV	1	1988–1989	8	65	8	4	12	8.1	1.0	0.5	1.5	
Caldwell Jones	F/C	Albany State	1	1984–1985	42	885	211	34	142	21.1	5.0	0.8	3.4	
Carlik Jones	G	Louisville	1	2022–2023	7	56	5	6	20	8.0	0.7	0.9	2.9	
Charles Jones	F/C	Albany State	1	1984–1985	3	29	6	1	8	9.7	2.0	0.3	2.7	
Charles Jones	G	LIU Brooklyn	1	1998–1999	29	476	42	41	108	16.4	1.4	1.4	3.7	
Derrick Jones Jr.	F	UNLV	2	2021–2023	115	1,792	322	64	605	15.6	2.8	0.6	5.3	
Dwight Jones	F/C	Houston	4	1979–1983	261	5,457	1,399	343	2,146	20.9	5.4	1.3	8.2	
Tre Jones^{x}	G	Duke	2	2024–2026	83	2,207	262	438	1,121	26.6	3.2	5.3	13.5	
Michael Jordan^ (#23)	G/F	North Carolina	13	1984–1993; 1994–1998	930	35,887	5,836	5,012	29,277	38.6	6.3	5.4	31.5	
Bob Kauffman	F/C	Guilford	1	1969–1970	64	775	211	76	276	12.1	3.3	1.2	4.3	
Yuki Kawamura	G	(Japan) Yokohama B-Corsairs	1	2025–2026	18	209	33	47	62	11.6	1.8	2.6	3.4	
Larry Kenon	F	Memphis	3	1980–1983	142	3,222	582	185	1,526	22.7	4.1	1.3	10.7	
Steve Kerr	G	Arizona	5	1993–1998	378	8,774	567	824	3,109	23.2	1.5	2.2	8.2	
Lari Ketner	F/C	UMass	1	1999–2000	6	41	7	1	10	6.8	1.2	0.2	1.7	
Victor Khryapa	F	(Russia) CSKA Moscow	2	2006–2008	42	336	77	29	105	8.0	1.8	0.7	2.5	
Sean Kilpatrick	G	Cincinnati	1	2017–2018	9	214	25	13	139	23.8	2.8	1.4	15.4	
Jim King	G	Tulsa	3	1970–1973	193	2,444	225	260	953	12.7	1.2	1.3	4.9	
Stacey King	F/C	Oklahoma	5	1989–1994	344	5,839	1,136	339	2,278	17.0	3.3	1.0	6.6	
Joe Kleine	C	Arkansas	1	1997–1998	46	397	77	30	93	8.6	1.7	0.7	2.0	
Don Kojis	F	Marquette	1	1966–1967	78	1,655	479	70	792	21.2	6.1	0.9	10.2	
Luke Kornet	C	Vanderbilt	2	2019–2021	49	653	99	36	241	13.3	2.0	0.7	4.9	
Kyle Korver	G/F	Creighton	2	2010–2012	147	3,118	309	236	1,210	21.2	2.1	1.6	8.2	
Tom Kropp	G	Nebraska-Kearney	1	1976–1977	53	480	47	39	174	9.1	0.9	0.7	3.3	
Larry Krystkowiak	F/C	Montana	1	1994–1995	19	287	59	26	83	15.1	3.1	1.4	4.4	
Toni Kukoč^	F	(Italy) Benetton Treviso	7	1993–2000	436	12,862	2,088	1,840	6,148	29.5	4.8	4.2	14.1	

=== L to M ===
All-time roster
Player	Pos.	Pre-draft team	Yrs	Seasons	Statistics									Ref.
Player	Pos.	Pre-draft team	Yrs	Seasons	GP	MP	REB	AST	PTS	MPG	RPG	APG	PPG	Ref.
Mark Landsberger	F/C	Arizona State	3	1977–1980	196	4,021	1,493	141	1,445	20.5	7.6	0.7	7.4	
Andrew Lang	C	Arkansas	1	1998–1999	21	386	93	13	80	18.4	4.4	0.6	3.8	
Rusty LaRue	G	Wake Forest	3	1997–2000	61	1,001	74	79	289	16.4	1.2	1.3	4.7	
John Laskowski	G	Indiana	2	1975–1977	118	2,132	282	99	832	18.1	2.4	0.8	7.1	
Joffrey Lauvergne	F/C	(Serbia) Partizan	1	2016–2017	20	241	68	19	89	12.1	3.4	1.0	4.5	
Zach LaVine^{+}	G/F	UCLA	8	2017–2025	416	14,346	1,950	1,808	10,056	34.5	4.7	4.3	24.2	
Acie Law	G	Texas A&M	1	2009–2010	12	135	14	16	66	11.3	1.2	1.3	5.5	
Walt Lemon Jr.	G	Bradley	1	2018–2019	6	167	27	30	86	27.8	4.5	5.0	14.3	
Ronnie Lester	G	Iowa	4	1980–1984	191	4,459	437	869	1,660	23.3	2.3	4.5	8.7	
Clifford Lett	G	Florida	1	1989–1990	4	28	0	1	4	7.0	0.0	0.3	1.0	
Cliff Levingston	F	Wichita State	2	1990–1992	157	2,033	452	122	625	12.9	2.9	0.8	4.0	
E. J. Liddell	F	Ohio State	1	2024–2025	12	53	9	3	21	4.4	0.8	0.3	1.8	
Randy Livingston	G	LSU	1	2005–2006	5	22	4	1	0	4.4	0.8	0.2	0.0	
Scott Lloyd	F/C	Arizona State	1	1978–1979	67	465	93	32	111	6.9	1.4	0.5	1.7	
Luc Longley	C	New Mexico	5	1993–1998	261	6,330	1,392	557	2,326	24.3	5.3	2.1	8.9	
Robin Lopez	C	Stanford	3	2016–2019	219	5,567	1,096	293	2,299	25.4	5.0	1.3	10.5	
Bob Love^{+} (#10)	F	Southern	9	1968–1977	592	22,073	3,998	991	12,623	37.3	6.8	1.7	21.3	
John Lucas III	G	Oklahoma State	2	2010–2012	51	736	76	109	371	14.4	1.5	2.1	7.3	
Timothé Luwawu-Cabarrot	F	(Serbia) Mega Leks	1	2018–2019	29	546	79	22	196	18.8	2.7	0.8	6.8	
Oliver Mack	G	East Carolina	2	1979–1981	26	542	50	34	186	20.8	1.9	1.3	7.2	
Kyle Macy	G	Kentucky	1	1985–1986	82	2,426	178	446	703	29.6	2.2	5.4	8.6	
Matt Maloney	G	Penn	1	1999–2000	51	1,175	64	138	327	23.0	1.3	2.7	6.4	
Ed Manning	F	Jackson State	1	1969–1970	38	616	197	34	211	16.2	5.2	0.9	5.6	
Jack Marin	G/F	Duke	2	1975–1977	121	2,500	303	180	1,103	20.7	2.5	1.5	9.1	
Lauri Markkanen	F/C	Arizona	4	2017–2021	221	6,511	1,559	273	3,439	29.5	7.1	1.2	15.6	
Donyell Marshall	F	UConn	2	2002–2004	94	2,786	798	165	1,181	29.6	8.5	1.8	12.6	
Cartier Martin	F	Kansas State	1	2013–2014	6	48	5	2	15	8.0	0.8	0.3	2.5	
Roger Mason Jr.	G	Virginia	2	2002–2004	20	156	15	15	33	7.8	0.8	0.8	1.7	
Wes Matthews	G	Wisconsin	1	1984–1985	78	1,523	67	354	443	19.5	0.9	4.5	5.7	
Scott May	F	Indiana	5	1976–1981	281	6,687	1,206	465	3,048	23.8	4.3	1.7	10.8	
Mac McClung	G	Texas Tech	2	2021–2022; 2025–2026	9	104	6	9	50	11.6	0.7	1.0	5.6	
Paul McCracken	G	Cal State Northridge	1	1976–1977	9	119	16	14	47	13.2	1.8	1.6	5.2	
Rodney McCray	G/F	Louisville	1	1992–1993	64	1,019	158	81	222	15.9	2.5	1.3	3.5	
Doug McDermott	F	Creighton	3	2014–2017	161	3,260	368	110	1,320	20.2	2.3	0.7	8.2	
Kennedy McIntosh	F	Eastern Michigan	2	1971–1973	46	438	98	19	151	9.5	2.1	0.4	3.3	
Billy McKinney	G	Northwestern	1	1985–1986	9	83	5	13	22	9.2	0.6	1.4	2.4	
Alfonzo McKinnie	F	Green Bay	1	2021–2022	17	206	33	5	59	12.1	1.9	0.3	3.5	
McCoy McLemore	F/C	Drake	2	1966–1968	155	3,482	804	192	1,689	22.5	5.2	1.2	10.9	
John Mengelt	G	Auburn	4	1976–1980	253	5,037	380	571	2,386	19.9	1.5	2.3	9.4	
Ron Mercer	G/F	Kentucky	2	2000–2002	101	4,038	391	319	1,875	40.0	3.9	3.2	18.6	
Brad Miller	C	Purdue	4	2000–2002; 2008–2010	214	5,521	1,420	448	2,150	25.8	6.6	2.1	10.0	
Emanuel Miller	F	TCU	2	2024–2026	11	58	11	6	25	5.3	0.5	0.3	2.3	
Leonard Miller^{x}	F	(Canada) Fort Erie International Academy	1	2025–2026	27	624	156	35	317	23.1	5.8	1.3	11.7	
Nikola Mirotić	F	(Spain) Real Madrid	4	2014–2018	243	5,601	1,309	311	2,774	23.0	5.4	1.3	11.4	
Nazr Mohammed	C	Kentucky	3	2012–2015	166	1,383	408	49	317	8.3	2.5	0.3	1.9	
Adam Mokoka	G	(Serbia) Mega Bemax	2	2019–2021	25	168	15	9	47	6.7	0.6	0.4	1.9	
E'Twaun Moore	G/F	Purdue	2	2014–2016	115	1,767	179	132	592	15.4	1.6	1.1	5.1	
Anthony Morrow	G	Georgia Tech	1	2016–2017	9	87	2	6	41	9.7	0.2	0.7	4.6	
Erwin Mueller	F/C	San Francisco	3	1966–1969	167	3,823	857	331	1,439	22.9	5.1	2.0	8.6	
Erik Murphy	F	Florida	1	2013–2014	24	62	8	2	6	2.6	0.3	0.1	0.3	
Ronald Murray	G	Shaw	1	2009–2010	29	680	85	51	292	23.4	2.9	1.8	10.1	
Pete Myers	G/F	Little Rock	3	1986–1987; 1993–1995	182	3,455	337	414	1,034	19.0	1.9	2.3	5.7	

=== N to P ===
All-time roster
Player	Pos.	Pre-draft team	Yrs	Seasons	Statistics									Ref.
Player	Pos.	Pre-draft team	Yrs	Seasons	GP	MP	REB	AST	PTS	MPG	RPG	APG	PPG	Ref.
Ed Nealy	F	Kansas State	3	1988–1990; 1992–1993	70	676	177	36	138	9.7	2.5	0.5	2.0	
Chuck Nevitt	C	NC State	1	1991–1992	4	9	1	1	2	2.3	0.3	0.3	0.5	
Dave Newmark	C	Columbia	1	1968–1969	81	1,159	347	58	456	14.3	4.3	0.7	5.6	
Demetris Nichols	F	Syracuse	2	2007–2009	13	35	4	2	15	2.7	0.3	0.2	1.2	
Joakim Noah^{+}	C	Florida	9	2007–2016	572	16,848	5,387	1,704	5,325	29.5	9.4	3.0	9.3	
Andrés Nocioni	F	(Spain) Tau Cerámica	5	2004–2009	351	8,836	1,751	451	4,120	25.2	5.0	1.3	11.7	
David Nwaba	G	Cal Poly	1	2017–2018	70	1,646	326	104	555	23.5	4.7	1.5	7.9	
Charles Oakley	F/C	Virginia Union	4	1985–1988; 2001–2002	298	8,951	3,147	791	3,162	30.0	10.6	2.7	10.6	
Isaac Okoro^{x}	G	Auburn	1	2025–2026	63	1,695	173	100	584	26.9	2.7	1.6	9.3	
Mark Olberding	F	Minnesota	1	1982–1983	80	1,817	358	131	698	22.7	4.5	1.6	8.7	
Lachlan Olbrich	C	UC Riverside	1	2025–2026	37	344	112	42	89	9.3	3.0	1.1	2.4	
Jawann Oldham	C	Seattle	4	1982–1986	195	3,310	822	106	932	17.0	4.2	0.5	4.8	
Kevin Ollie	G	UConn	1	2001–2002	52	1,146	128	193	304	22.0	2.5	3.7	5.8	
Jannero Pargo	G	Arkansas	4	2003–2006; 2009–2010	165	2,273	213	306	997	13.8	1.3	1.9	6.0	
Robert Parish^	C	Centenary	1	1996–1997	43	406	89	22	161	9.4	2.1	0.5	3.7	
Jabari Parker	F	Duke	1	2018–2019	39	1,042	241	84	556	26.7	6.2	2.2	14.3	
Steve Patterson	C	UCLA	1	1975–1976	52	782	200	71	164	15.0	3.8	1.4	3.2	
Charlie Paulk	F/C	Northeastern State	1	1971–1972	7	60	15	4	23	8.6	2.1	0.6	3.3	
John Paxson	G	Notre Dame	9	1985–1994	645	15,540	805	2,394	4,932	24.1	1.2	3.7	7.6	
Cameron Payne	G	Murray State	3	2016–2019	67	1,260	139	211	451	18.8	2.1	3.1	6.7	
Will Perdue	C	Vanderbilt	8	1988–1995; 1999–2000	518	7,052	2,104	447	2,264	13.6	4.1	0.9	4.4	
Loy Petersen	G	Oregon State	2	1968–1970	69	530	67	48	199	7.7	1.0	0.7	2.9	
Julian Phillips	F	Tennessee	3	2023–2026	154	1,780	249	59	554	11.6	1.6	0.4	3.6	
Eric Piatkowski	G/F	Nebraska	2	2004–2006	97	1,069	102	64	383	11.0	1.1	0.7	3.9	
Scottie Pippen^ (#33)	G/F	Central Arkansas	12	1987–1998; 2003–2004	856	30,269	5,726	4,494	15,123	35.4	6.7	5.3	17.7	
Cliff Pondexter	F/C	Long Beach State	3	1975–1978	197	2,856	747	218	778	14.5	3.8	1.1	3.9	
Quincy Pondexter	G/F	Washington	1	2017–2018	23	196	27	9	45	8.5	1.2	0.4	2.0	
Ben Poquette	F/C	Central Michigan	1	1986–1987	21	167	24	7	51	8.0	1.1	0.3	2.4	
Howard Porter	F/C	Villanova	3	1971–1974	183	2,366	586	72	1,303	12.9	3.2	0.4	7.1	
Otto Porter Jr.	F	Georgetown	3	2018–2021	54	1,363	269	115	676	25.2	5.0	2.1	12.5	
Bobby Portis	F	Arkansas	4	2015–2019	221	4,276	1,292	239	2,147	19.3	5.8	1.1	9.7	
Dominic Pressley	G	Boston College	1	1988–1989	3	17	1	4	2	5.7	0.3	1.3	0.7	

=== R ===
All-time roster
Player	Pos.	Pre-draft team	Yrs	Seasons	Statistics									Ref.
Player	Pos.	Pre-draft team	Yrs	Seasons	GP	MP	REB	AST	PTS	MPG	RPG	APG	PPG	Ref.
Vladimir Radmanović	F	(Federal Republic of Yugoslavia) FMP	1	2012–2013	25	144	28	8	33	5.8	1.1	0.3	1.3	
Mark Randall	F	Kansas	1	1991–1992	15	67	9	7	26	4.5	0.6	0.5	1.7	
Clifford Ray	C	Oklahoma	3	1971–1974	235	6,513	2,643	771	1,950	27.7	11.2	3.3	8.3	
Khalid Reeves	G	Arizona	1	1999–2000	3	48	4	13	11	16.0	1.3	4.3	3.7	
Jared Reiner	C	Iowa	1	2004–2005	19	132	38	1	21	6.9	2.0	0.1	1.1	
Chris Richard	F	Florida	1	2009–2010	18	224	59	7	37	12.4	3.3	0.4	2.1	
Nick Richards	C	Kentucky	1	2025–2026	20	447	152	8	187	22.4	7.6	0.4	9.4	
Norman Richardson	G	Hofstra	1	2001–2002	8	63	7	1	30	7.9	0.9	0.1	3.8	
Anthony Roberson	G	Florida	1	2008–2009	6	23	7	1	12	3.8	1.2	0.2	2.0	
Eddie Robinson	G/F	Central Oklahoma	3	2001–2004	144	3,032	382	161	969	21.1	2.7	1.1	6.7	
Flynn Robinson	G	Wyoming	2	1967–1969	91	2,580	337	271	1,510	28.4	3.7	3.0	16.6	
Jackie Robinson	F	UNLV	1	1981–1982	3	29	3	0	10	9.7	1.0	0.0	3.3	
Nate Robinson	G	Washington	1	2012–2013	82	2,086	184	358	1,074	25.4	2.2	4.4	13.1	
Guy Rodgers^	G	Temple	2	1966–1968	85	3,192	360	936	1,500	37.6	4.2	11.0	17.6	
Dennis Rodman^	F	Southeastern Oklahoma State	3	1995–1998	199	6,891	3,036	560	1,037	34.6	15.3	2.8	5.2	
Rajon Rondo	G	Kentucky	1	2016–2017	69	1,843	355	461	538	26.7	5.1	6.7	7.8	
Derrick Rose^{+} (#1)	G	Memphis	7	2008–2012; 2013–2016	406	14,210	1,489	2,516	8,001	35.0	3.7	6.2	19.7	
Jalen Rose	G/F	Michigan	3	2001–2004	128	5,096	539	609	2,742	39.8	4.2	4.8	21.4	
Michael Ruffin	F	Tulsa	2	1999–2001	116	1,854	512	83	278	16.0	4.4	0.7	2.4	
Paul Ruffner	F/C	BYU	1	1970–1971	10	60	16	2	34	6.0	1.6	0.2	3.4	
Cazzie Russell	G/F	Michigan	1	1977–1978	36	789	83	61	315	21.9	2.3	1.7	8.8	
Frank Russell	G	Detroit Mercy	1	1972–1973	23	131	17	15	74	5.7	0.7	0.7	3.2	

=== S ===
All-time roster
Player	Pos.	Pre-draft team	Yrs	Seasons	Statistics									Ref.
Player	Pos.	Pre-draft team	Yrs	Seasons	GP	MP	REB	AST	PTS	MPG	RPG	APG	PPG	Ref.
John Salley	F/C	Georgia Tech	1	1995–1996	17	191	43	15	36	11.2	2.5	0.9	2.1	
John Salmons	G	Miami (FL)	2	2008–2010	77	2,674	286	178	1,125	34.7	3.7	2.3	14.6	
Brandon Sampson	G	LSU	1	2018–2019	14	214	16	10	71	15.3	1.1	0.7	5.1	
JaKarr Sampson	G/F	St. John's	1	2018–2019	4	127	32	4	80	31.8	8.0	1.0	20.0	
Jeff Sanders	F	Georgia Southern	1	1989–1990	31	182	39	9	28	5.9	1.3	0.3	0.9	
Adama Sanogo	F/C	UConn	2	2023–2025	13	87	42	1	44	6.7	3.2	0.1	3.4	
Tomáš Satoranský	G	(Spain) Sevilla	2	2019–2021	123	3,185	396	625	1,091	25.9	3.2	5.1	8.9	
Brian Scalabrine	F	USC	2	2010–2012	46	210	29	21	52	4.6	0.6	0.5	1.1	
Dave Schellhase	G	Purdue	2	1966–1968	73	513	76	60	208	7.0	1.0	0.8	2.8	
Luke Schenscher	C	Georgia Tech	1	2005–2006	20	149	29	7	36	7.5	1.5	0.4	1.8	
Thabo Sefolosha	G/F	(Italy) Angelico Biella	3	2006–2009	183	3,039	531	254	914	16.6	2.9	1.4	5.0	
Wayne Selden Jr.	G/F	Kansas	1	2018–2019	43	984	136	73	342	22.9	3.2	1.7	8.0	
Brad Sellers	F/C	Ohio State	3	1986–1989	242	5,695	850	342	2,008	23.5	3.5	1.4	8.3	
Collin Sexton	G	Alabama	1	2025–2026	26	676	75	66	454	26.0	2.9	2.5	17.5	
Tornike Shengelia	F	(Belgium) Spirou Charleroi	1	2013–2014	9	17	2	2	4	1.9	0.2	0.2	0.4	
Steve Sheppard	F	Maryland	2	1977–1979	86	901	159	58	335	10.5	1.8	0.7	3.9	
Paul Shirley	F/C	Iowa State	1	2003–2004	7	86	16	4	21	12.3	2.3	0.6	3.0	
Cedric Simmons	F	NC State	2	2007–2009	18	80	15	2	32	4.4	0.8	0.1	1.8	
Marko Simonović	F/C	(Serbia) Mega Basket	2	2021–2023	16	55	12	0	23	3.4	0.8	0.0	1.4	
Anfernee Simons	G	IMG Academy (FL)	1	2025–2026	6	170	17	18	91	28.3	2.8	3.0	15.2	
Dickey Simpkins	F	Providence	6	1994–2000	307	5,002	1,141	288	1,334	16.3	3.7	0.9	4.3	
Jerry Sloan^ (#4)	G/F	Evansville	10	1966–1976	696	24,798	5,385	1,815	10,233	35.6	7.7	2.6	14.7	
Jalen Smith^{x}	C	Maryland	2	2024–2026	117	2,057	712	130	1,065	17.6	6.1	1.1	9.1	
Joe Smith	F	Maryland	1	2007–2008	50	1,146	265	47	559	22.9	5.3	0.9	11.2	
Sam Smith	G	UNLV	1	1979–1980	30	496	54	42	259	16.5	1.8	1.4	8.6	
Willie Smith	G	Missouri	1	1976–1977	2	11	0	0	0	5.5	0.0	0.0	0.0	
Mike Smrek	C	Canisius	1	1985–1986	38	408	110	19	108	10.7	2.9	0.5	2.8	
Tony Snell	G/F	New Mexico	3	2013–2016	213	3,944	499	193	1,119	18.5	2.3	0.9	5.3	
Ricky Sobers	G	UNLV	3	1979–1982	233	6,414	528	1,011	3,059	27.5	2.3	4.3	13.1	
Darius Songaila	F	Wake Forest	1	2005–2006	62	1,329	246	88	568	21.4	4.0	1.4	9.2	
Rory Sparrow	G	Villanova	2	1987–1988; 1991–1992	59	1,010	71	166	253	17.1	1.2	2.8	4.3	
Craig Spitzer	C	Tulane	1	1967–1968	10	44	24	0	18	4.4	2.4	0.0	1.8	
Larry Spriggs	F	Howard	1	1982–1983	9	39	9	3	21	4.3	1.0	0.3	2.3	
John Starks	G	Oklahoma State	1	1999–2000	4	82	10	11	30	20.5	2.5	2.8	7.5	
Keith Starr	G/F	Pittsburgh	1	1976–1977	17	65	10	6	14	3.8	0.6	0.4	0.8	
Matt Steigenga	F	Michigan State	1	1996–1997	2	12	3	2	3	6.0	1.5	1.0	1.5	
Max Strus	G/F	DePaul	1	2019–2020	2	6	1	0	5	3.0	0.5	0.0	2.5	
Michael Sweetney	F	Georgetown	2	2005–2007	114	1,607	470	87	686	14.1	4.1	0.8	6.0	

=== T to V ===
All-time roster
Player	Pos.	Pre-draft team	Yrs	Seasons	Statistics									Ref.
Player	Pos.	Pre-draft team	Yrs	Seasons	GP	MP	REB	AST	PTS	MPG	RPG	APG	PPG	Ref.
Dragan Tarlać	C	(Greece) Olympiacos	1	2000–2001	43	598	122	31	103	13.9	2.8	0.7	2.4	
Terry Taylor	F	Austin Peay	2	2022–2024	36	224	45	10	66	6.2	1.3	0.3	1.8	
Marquis Teague	G	Kentucky	2	2012–2014	67	634	63	91	144	9.5	0.9	1.4	2.1	
Garrett Temple	G/F	LSU	1	2020–2021	56	1,528	160	124	423	27.3	2.9	2.2	7.6	
Dalen Terry	G	Arizona	4	2022–2026	204	2,259	338	243	709	11.1	1.7	1.2	3.5	
Daniel Theis	C	(Germany) Ratiopharm Ulm	1	2020–2021	23	574	136	41	230	25.0	5.9	1.8	10.0	
Reggie Theus^{+}	G	UNLV	6	1978–1984	441	14,897	1,502	2,472	8,279	33.8	3.4	5.6	18.8	
James Thomas	F	Texas	1	2005–2006	7	26	8	0	6	3.7	1.1	0.0	0.9	
Kurt Thomas	F	TCU	1	2010–2011	52	1,178	301	60	211	22.7	5.8	1.2	4.1	
Malcolm Thomas	F	San Diego State	1	2012–2013	7	36	11	2	12	5.1	1.6	0.3	1.7	
Matt Thomas	G	Iowa State	1	2021–2022	40	459	50	20	161	11.5	1.3	0.5	4.0	
Tim Thomas	F	Villanova	2	2005–2006; 2008–2009	21	286	46	14	118	13.6	2.2	0.7	5.6	
Tyrus Thomas	F	LSU	4	2006–2010	254	5,149	1,302	240	1,989	20.3	5.1	0.9	7.8	
Tristan Thompson	C	Texas	1	2021–2022	23	376	109	14	130	16.3	4.7	0.6	5.7	
Sedale Threatt	G	West Virginia Tech	2	1986–1988	85	1,479	106	284	613	17.4	1.2	3.3	7.2	
Nate Thurmond^	C	Bowling Green	2	1974–1976	93	3,016	975	354	680	32.4	10.5	3.8	7.3	
Al Tucker	F	Oklahoma Baptist	1	1969–1970	33	557	113	31	231	16.9	3.4	0.9	7.0	
Trent Tucker	G	Minnesota	1	1992–1993	69	909	71	82	356	13.2	1.0	1.2	5.2	
Elston Turner	G/F	Ole Miss	2	1986–1988	87	1,034	125	111	265	11.9	1.4	1.3	3.0	
Tyler Ulis	G	Kentucky	1	2018–2019	1	1	0	0	0	1.0	0.0	0.0	0.0	
Denzel Valentine	G	Michigan State	4	2016–2018; 2019–2021	232	4,595	815	455	1,726	19.8	3.5	2.0	7.4	
Norm Van Lier^{+}	G	Saint Francis (PA)	7	1971–1978	535	19,122	2,506	3,676	6,505	35.7	4.7	6.9	12.2	
Jarvis Varnado	F	Mississippi State	1	2013–2014	1	2	0	0	0	2.0	0.0	0.0	0.0	
David Vaughn III	F	Memphis	1	1997–1998	3	6	1	0	4	2.0	0.3	0.0	1.3	
Sam Vincent	G	Michigan State	2	1987–1989	99	2,656	293	579	1,034	26.8	3.0	5.8	10.4	
Noah Vonleh	F	Indiana	1	2017–2018	21	399	144	21	145	19.0	6.9	1.0	6.9	
Jake Voskuhl	C	UConn	1	2000–2001	16	143	34	5	30	8.9	2.1	0.3	1.9	
Nikola Vučević	C	USC	6	2020–2026	378	12,380	3,974	1,294	6,823	32.8	10.5	3.4	18.1	

=== W to Z ===
All-time roster
Player	Pos.	Pre-draft team	Yrs	Seasons	Statistics									Ref.
Player	Pos.	Pre-draft team	Yrs	Seasons	GP	MP	REB	AST	PTS	MPG	RPG	APG	PPG	Ref.
Dwyane Wade	G	Marquette	1	2016–2017	60	1,792	270	228	1,096	29.9	4.5	3.8	18.3	
Granville Waiters	C	Ohio State	2	1986–1988	66	648	115	23	103	9.8	1.7	0.3	1.6	
Andre Wakefield	G	Loyola (IL)	1	1978–1979	2	8	0	1	0	4.0	0.0	0.5	0.0	
Chet Walker^	G/F	Bradley	6	1969–1975	474	15,809	2,898	1,097	9,788	33.4	6.1	2.3	20.6	
Darrell Walker	G	Arkansas	1	1992–1993	28	367	39	44	72	13.1	1.4	1.6	2.6	
Ben Wallace	F/C	Virginia Union	2	2006–2008	127	4,324	1,262	278	749	34.0	9.9	2.2	5.9	
Gerry Ward	G	Boston College	1	1966–1967	76	1,042	179	130	321	13.7	2.4	1.7	4.2	
Hakim Warrick	F	Syracuse	1	2009–2010	28	533	102	17	243	19.0	3.6	0.6	8.7	
Jim Washington	F/C	Villanova	3	1966–1969	239	6,705	2,140	273	2,736	28.1	9.0	1.1	11.4	
C. J. Watson	G	Tennessee	2	2010–2012	131	2,250	199	386	879	17.2	1.5	2.9	6.7	
Nick Weatherspoon	F	Illinois	1	1977–1978	41	611	125	32	209	14.9	3.0	0.8	5.1	
Bob Weiss	G	Penn State	6	1968–1974	469	12,261	972	2,008	4,445	26.1	2.1	4.3	9.5	
Bill Wennington	C	St. John's	6	1993–1999	367	5,093	1,005	234	1,871	13.9	2.7	0.6	5.1	
Walt Wesley	C	Kansas	1	1969–1970	72	1,407	455	68	685	19.5	6.3	0.9	9.5	
Ennis Whatley	G	Alabama	2	1983–1985	150	3,544	298	1,043	1,017	23.6	2.0	7.0	6.8	
Coby White	G	North Carolina	7	2019–2026	451	13,409	1,647	1,754	6,945	29.7	3.7	3.9	15.4	
Tony White	G	Tennessee	1	1987–1988	2	2	0	0	0	1.0	0.0	0.0	0.0	
Mitchell Wiggins	G	Florida State	1	1983–1984	82	2,123	328	187	1,018	25.9	4.0	2.3	12.4	
Ken Wilburn	F	Central State	2	1967–1969	7	40	13	3	18	5.7	1.9	0.4	2.6	
Bob Wilkerson	G/F	Indiana	1	1980–1981	80	2,238	282	272	798	28.0	3.5	3.4	10.0	
James Wilkes	F	UCLA	2	1980–1982	105	1,402	255	94	513	13.4	2.4	0.9	4.9	
Brian Williams	F/C	Arizona	1	1996–1997	9	138	33	12	63	15.3	3.7	1.3	7.0	
Corey Williams	G	Oklahoma State	1	1992–1993	35	242	31	23	81	6.9	0.9	0.7	2.3	
Frank Williams	G	Illinois	1	2004–2005	9	71	6	11	6	7.9	0.7	1.2	0.7	
Jay Williams	G	Duke	1	2002–2003	75	1,961	195	350	714	26.1	2.6	4.7	9.5	
Jerome Williams	F	Georgetown	1	2003–2004	53	1,230	347	61	345	23.2	6.5	1.2	6.5	
Patrick Williams^{x}	F	Florida State	6	2020–2026	348	8,952	1,341	509	3,141	25.7	3.9	1.5	9.0	
Scott Williams	F/C	North Carolina	4	1990–1994	223	3,034	977	173	1,052	13.6	4.4	0.8	4.7	
Dedric Willoughby	G/F	Iowa State	1	1999–2000	25	508	51	66	190	20.3	2.0	2.6	7.6	
Bobby Wilson	G	Wichita State	2	1974–1976	106	1,281	146	88	713	12.1	1.4	0.8	6.7	
George Wilson	C	Cincinnati	1	1966–1967	43	448	163	15	199	10.4	3.8	0.3	4.6	
David Wood	F	Nevada	1	1988–1989	2	2	0	0	0	1.0	0.0	0.0	0.0	
Orlando Woolridge	F	Notre Dame	5	1981–1986	354	10,423	1,679	662	6,146	29.4	4.7	1.9	17.4	
Sam Worthen	G	Marquette	1	1980–1981	64	945	115	115	235	14.8	1.8	1.8	3.7	
Guerschon Yabusele	C	(France) Rouen Métropole	1	2025–2026	26	641	147	45	261	24.7	5.7	1.7	10.0	
Jahmir Young	G	Maryland	1	2024–2025	6	30	3	6	11	5.0	0.5	1.0	1.8	
Perry Young	G	Virginia Tech	1	1986–1987	5	20	1	0	5	4.0	0.2	0.0	1.0	
Thaddeus Young	F	Georgia Tech	2	2019–2021	132	3,243	738	408	1,482	24.6	5.6	3.1	11.2	
Paul Zipser	G/F	(Germany) Bayern Munich	2	2016–2018	98	1,667	256	82	458	17.0	2.6	0.8	4.7	
