= Chicago Bulls draft history =

National Basketball Association team drafts

In their 60-year history, the Chicago Bulls have selected the following players in the National Basketball Association draft.

== Key ==
Naismith Basketball Hall of Famer	First overall NBA draft pick	Selected for an NBA All-Star Game

Year	Round	Pick	Player	Nationality	College/High School/Club
1966	1	10	Dave Schellhase	United States	Purdue
1966	2	20	Erwin Mueller	United States	San Francisco
1966	3	30	Ed Bodkin	United States	Eastern Kentucky
1966	4	40	Jim Williams	United States	Temple
1966	5	50	Larry Humes	United States	Evansville
1966	7	68	John Comeaux	United States	Grambling State
1966	8	77	Stan Curtis	United States	Northern Michigan
1966	9	84	Gene Summers	United States	Northern Michigan
1966	10	91	Don Swanson	United States	DePaul
1966	11	97	Carver Clinton	United States	Penn State
1967	1	3	Clem Haskins	United States	Western Kentucky
1967	2	15	Byron Beck	United States	Denver
1967	3	22	John Dickson	United States	Arkansas State
1967	4	34	Jim Burns	United States	Northwestern
1967	5	46	Dick Pruet	United States	Jacksonville
1967	6	58	Marlbert Pradd	United States	Dillard
1967	7	70	Bob Wolf	United States	Marquette
1967	8	82	Leon Simon	United States	Santa Fe
1967	9	93	Ernie Laurent	United States	Albuquerque
1967	10	104	Jim Boshart	United States	Wake Forest
1967	11	115	Jim Andros	United States	New Haven
1967	12	126	Ron Widby	United States	Tennessee
1967	13	136	Tom Storm	United States	Montana State
1967	14	143	Don Whitehead	United States	Erskine
1967	15	149	Jim Garza	United States	Lawrence Tech
1967	16	154	Jimmy Dawson	United States	Illinois
1968	1	4	Tom Boerwinkle	United States	Tennessee
1968	2	17	Loy Petersen	United States	Oregon State
1968	2	19	Ron Dunlap	United States	Illinois
1968	3	31	Dave Newmark	United States	Columbia
1968	4	39	Mike Lynn	United States	UCLA
1968	5	53	Jim Tillman	United States	Loyola
1968	6	67	Ken Barnett	United States	Delaware
1968	7	81	Willie Davis	United States	North Texas
1968	8	95	Lloyd Higgins	United States	Point Loma Nazarene
1968	9	109	Corky Bell	United States	Loyola
1968	10	123	Mike Weaver	United States	Northwestern
1968	11	137	Jim McGonigle	United States	Iowa State
1968	12	150	John Lallensack	United States	Wisconsin–Oshkosh
1968	13	163	Herm Gilliam	United States	Purdue
1968	14	174	Dave Carr	United States	Washington
1968	15	183	Mickey McCarty	United States	TCU
1968	16	191	Fred Holden	United States	Louisville
1968	17	199	Tom Benedict	United States	Central Washington
1968	18	205	Bob Zoretich	United States	DePaul
1968	19	209	Rich Mason	United States	Indiana State
1968	20	212	Rick Kirkland	United States	Norfolk State
1968	21	214	Willie Horton	United States	Delaware
1969	1	5	Larry Cannon	United States	La Salle
1969	2	16	Simmie Hill	United States	West Texas A&M
1969	2	20	Ken Spain	United States	Houston
1969	2	23	Johnny Baum	United States	Temple
1969	3	34	Norm Van Lier	United States	Saint Francis
1969	4	48	Dave Nash	United States	Kansas
1969	5	62	Chris Ellis	United States	Virginia Tech
1969	6	76	George Tinsley	United States	Kentucky Wesleyan
1969	7	90	Frank Judge	United States	Huston–Tillotson
1969	8	104	Roger Moller	United States	Westmar
1969	9	118	Sterling Burke	United States	Northwestern
1969	10	132	Al Smith	United States	Bradley
1969	11	146	Larry Bergh	United States	Weber State
1969	12	159	Harry Hall	United States	Wyoming
1969	13	172	Rick Kirkland	United States	Norfolk State
1969	14	183	Bill Boight	United States	SMU
1970	1	11	Jimmy Collins	United States	New Mexico State
1970	2	28	Paul Ruffner	United States	BYU
1970	3	45	Lou Herndon	United States	Jackson State
1970	4	57	John Davis	United States	Alabama State
1970	4	62	Jim Wilson	United States	Cheyney
1970	5	79	George Johnson	United States	Dillard
1970	6	96	Lonnie Kluttz	United States	North Carolina A&T
1970	7	113	Lou West	United States	Seattle
1970	8	130	Mike Casey	United States	Kentucky
1970	9	147	Glen Johnson	United States	Jackson State
1970	10	164	Dale Blaut	United States	West Texas A&M
1970	11	179	Doug Howard	United States	BYU
1970	12	191	Booker Brown	United States	Middle Tennessee
1970	13	201	Charles Bloodworth	United States	Northwestern State
1970	14	211	Paul Funkhouser	United States	McKendree
1970	15	220	Paul Otay	United States	Boise State
1971	1	15	Kennedy McIntosh	United States	Eastern Michigan
1971	2	20	Willard Sojourner	United States	Weber State
1971	2	32	Howard Porter	United States	Villanova
1971	3	40	Clifford Ray	United States	Oklahoma
1971	3	47	Mike Gale	United States	Elizabeth City State
1971	3	49	Dick Gibbs	United States	UTEP
1971	4	66	Jim Irving	United States	Saint Louis
1971	5	83	Larry Weatherford	United States	Purdue
1971	6	100	Jim England	United States	Tennessee
1971	7	117	Artis Gilmore	United States	Jacksonville
1971	8	134	Clarence Sherrod	United States	Wisconsin
1971	9	150	Jackie Dinkins	United States	Voorhees
1971	10	166	David Withers	United States	Delaware
1971	11	180	Al Smith	United States	Bradley
1971	12	193	Ken Riley	United States	Middle Tennessee
1971	13	205	Ed Goode	United States	DePaul
1971	14	214	Richard Dixon	United States	Loyola–New Orleans
1971	15	223	Liscio Thomas	United States	Furman
1971	16	229	Bob Bissant	United States	Loyola–New Orleans
1972	1	11	Ralph Simpson	United States	Michigan State
1972	3	35	Frank Russell	United States	Detroit
1972	3	45	Chuck Jura	United States	Nebraska
1972	4	62	Ted Martiniuk	United States	Saint Peter's
1972	5	78	Rowland Garrett	United States	Florida State
1972	6	95	Mike Stewart	United States	Santa Clara
1972	7	112	Jerry Pender	United States	Fresno State
1972	8	128	Cavin Anderson	United States	Valley City State
1972	9	142	Ralph Houston	United States	West Texas A&M
1972	10	155	Chuck Taylor	United States	West Liberty
1972	11	166	Jackie Young	United States	Rocky Mountain
1972	12	174	Al Cotler	United States	Pennsylvania
1972	13	180	Mike Barr	United States	Duquesne
1972	14	187	Andrew Pettes	United States	Oklahoma
1972	15	192	Greg Lowery	United States	Texas Tech
1972	16	196	Charles Hall	United States	Montana Western
1972	17	197	John Thornton	United States	South Carolina State
1972	18	198	Ron Manning	United States	Manhattan
1973	1	12	Kevin Kunnert	United States	Iowa
1973	2	24	Kevin Stacom	United States	Providence
1973	2	30	Wendell Hudson	United States	Alabama
1973	3	39	Martin Terry	United States	Arkansas
1973	3	47	Steve Newsome	United States	Houston
1973	4	64	Mark Sibley	United States	Northwestern
1973	5	81	Ray Simpson	United States	Furman
1973	6	98	Johnny Neumann	United States	Mississippi
1973	7	115	Billy Harris	United States	Northern Illinois
1973	8	132	J. G. Brosterhos	United States	Texas
1973	9	147	Rubin Montanez	Puerto Rico	Duquesne
1973	10	161	Russ Hunt	United States	Furman
1974	1	14	Maurice Lucas	United States	Marquette
1974	1	16	Cliff Pondexter	United States	Long Beach State
1974	2	27	Leon Benbow	United States	Jacksonville
1974	3	52	Bobby Wilson	United States	Wichita State
1974	4	70	Jim Forbes	United States	UTEP
1974	5	88	Randy Knowles	United States	Texas A&M
1974	6	106	Robert Rosier	United States	St. Thomas (Minn)
1974	7	124	Geoff Roberts	United States	Missouri
1974	8	142	Sam McCants	United States	Oral Roberts
1974	9	159	Jerry Davenport	United States	Cameron
1974	10	176	Rick Hockenos	United States	Saint Francis
1975	2	30	Steve Green	United States	Indiana
1975	2	32	John Laskowski	United States	Indiana
1975	4	68	Ron Haigler	United States	Pennsylvania
1975	5	86	Bob Iverson	United States	North Texas
1975	6	104	Bill Andreas	United States	Ohio State
1975	7	122	John Grochowalski	United States	Assumption
1975	8	140	John Murphy	United States	Massachusetts
1975	9	156	Gary Tomaszewski	United States	Saint Mary's
1976	1	2	Scott May	United States	Indiana
1976	2	18	Willie Smith	United States	Missouri
1976	3	35	Dallas Smith	United States	West Texas A&M
1976	3	37	Lars Hansen	Canada	Washington
1976	4	52	Keith Starr	United States	Pittsburgh
1976	5	69	Nate Williams	United States	Illinois
1976	6	87	Tom Paulin	United States	Winston-Salem State
1976	7	105	Barry McLeod	United States	Centenary
1976	9	141	John Thomas	United States	UConn
1976	10	158	John Hudson	United States	Concord
1977	1	13	Tate Armstrong	United States	Duke
1977	2	23	Mike Glenn	United States	Southern Illinois
1977	2	30	Steve Sheppard	United States	Maryland
1977	2	35	Mark Landsberger	United States	Arizona State
1977	4	79	Mike McConathy	United States	Louisiana Tech
1977	5	101	Nate Davis	United States	South Carolina
1977	6	123	Jay Chessman	United States	BYU
1977	7	143	Mike Smith	United States	Evansville
1977	8	162	Rich Rhodes	United States	Eastern Illinois
1978	1	9	Reggie Theus	United States	UNLV
1978	2	31	Marvin Johnson	United States	New Mexico
1978	3	53	Randy Ayers	United States	Miami(FL)
1978	5	97	Ron Anthony	United States	Jacksonville
1978	6	119	John Shoemaker	United States	Miami(FL)
1978	7	140	Jarvis Reynolds	United States	West Georgia
1978	8	159	Chubby Cox	United States	San Francisco
1978	9	176	Joe Ponsetto	United States	DePaul
1978	10	191	Mark Tucker	United States	Oklahoma State
1979	1	2	Dave Greenwood	United States	UCLA
1979	2	33	Lawrence Butler	United States	Idaho State
1979	3	47	Calvin Garrett	United States	Oral Roberts
1979	3	49	Cedrick Hordges	United States	South Carolina
1979	4	72	George Maynor	United States	East Carolina
1979	5	93	Larry Washington	United States	Drury
1979	6	114	Steve Smith	United States	USC
1979	7	133	Mike Eversley	United States	Chicago State
1979	8	153	Tony Warren	United States	North Carolina State
1979	9	171	James Jackson	United States	Minnesota
1979	10	190	Marvin Thoms	United States	UCLA
1979	10	197	Cortez Collins	United States	Southern Indiana
1980	1	4	Kelvin Ransey	United States	Ohio State
1980	2	26	Sam Worthen	United States	Marquette
1980	3	50	James Wilkes	United States	UCLA
1980	4	74	Ron Charles	United States	Michigan State
1980	5	96	Mike Campbell	United States	Northwestern
1980	6	120	Bernard Rencher	United States	St. John's
1980	7	142	Robert Byrd	United States	Marquette
1980	8	164	Modzel Greer	United States	North Park
1980	9	183	Jay Shidler	United States	Kentucky
1980	10	203	Billy Foster	United States	Montana State–Billings
1981	1	6	Orlando Woolridge	United States	Notre Dame
1981	2	32	Mike Olliver	United States	Lamar
1981	4	84	Oliver Lee	United States	Marquette
1981	5	108	Johnny Nash	United States	Arizona State
1981	6	130	Roger Burkman	United States	Louisville
1981	7	154	Scott Williams	United States	South Alabama
1981	8	175	Ben Mitchell	United States	Alabama–Huntsville
1981	9	197	Terry Martin	United States	Lambuth
1981	10	216	Kenny Easley	United States	UCLA
1982	1	7	Quintin Dailey	United States	San Francisco
1982	2	26	Ricky Frazier	United States	Missouri
1982	2	30	Wallace Bryant	United States	San Francisco
1982	2	31	Rod Higgins	United States	Fresno State
1982	3	53	Tyrone Adams	United States	Kansas State
1982	4	76	Chuck Aleksinas	United States	UConn
1982	5	99	Rubin Jackson	United States	Oklahoma City
1982	6	122	B. B. Fontenet	United States	Nevada
1982	7	145	Charles Verderber	United States	Kentucky
1982	8	168	Mike Burns	United States	UNLV
1982	9	191	Skip Dillard	United States	DePaul
1982	10	212	Tony Britto	United States	Campbell
1983	1	5	Sidney Green	United States	UNLV
1983	2	25	Sidney Lowe	United States	North Carolina State
1983	2	29	Larry Micheaux	United States	Houston
1983	4	75	Ron Crevier	Canada	Boston College
1983	5	98	Tim Andree	United States	Notre Dame
1983	6	121	Ernest Patterson	United States	New Mexico State
1983	7	144	Jacque Hill	United States	USC
1983	8	167	Terry Bradley	United States	Chicago State
1983	9	189	Ray Orange	United States	Oklahoma Christian
1983	10	210	Tom Emma	United States	Duke
1984	1	3	Michael Jordan	United States	North Carolina
1984	2	37	Ben Coleman	United States	Maryland
1984	2	43	Greg Wiltjer	Canada	Victoria
1984	3	49	Tim Dillon	United States	Northern Illinois
1984	4	72	Melvin Johnson	United States	Charlotte
1984	4	77	Mark Halsel	United States	Northeastern
1984	5	95	Lamont Robinson	United States	Lamar
1984	6	118	Jeff Tipton	United States	Morehead State
1984	7	141	Butch Hays	United States	California
1984	8	164	Brett Crawford	United States	USIU
1984	9	186	Calvin Pierce	United States	Oklahoma
1984	10	208	Carl Lewis	United States	Houston
1985	1	11	Keith Lee	United States	Memphis
1985	2	28	Ken Johnson	United States	Michigan State
1985	2	34	Aubrey Sherrod	United States	Wichita State
1985	2	46	Adrian Branch	United States	Maryland
1985	3	69	Mike Brown	United States	George Washington
1985	4	80	Craig Beard	United States	Samford
1985	5	103	Reid Gettys	United States	Houston
1985	6	126	Dan Meagher	Canada	Duke
1985	7	149	Jeff Adkins	United States	Maryland
1986	1	9	Brad Sellers	United States	Ohio State
1986	2	28	Larry Krystkowiak	United States	Montana
1986	3	52	Ricky Wilson	United States	George Mason
1986	4	74	Scott Meents	United States	Illinois
1986	5	98	Jimmy Gilbert	United States	Texas A&M
1986	6	120	Pete Myers	United States	Arkansas–Little Rock
1986	7	144	Robert Henderson	United States	Michigan
1987	1	8	Olden Polynice	Haiti	Virginia
1987	1	10	Horace Grant	United States	Clemson
1987	2	28	Rickie Winslow	United States	Houston
1987	2	33	Tony White	United States	Tennessee
1987	3	56	John Fox	United States	Millersville
1987	4	79	Jack Haley	United States	UCLA
1987	5	102	Anthony Wilson	United States	LSU
1987	6	125	Doug Altenberger	United States	Illinois
1987	7	148	Earvin Leavy	United States	Central Michigan
1988	1	11	Will Perdue	United States	Vanderbilt
1988	3	62	Derrick Lewis	United States	Maryland
1989	1	6	Stacey King	United States	Oklahoma
1989	1	18	B. J. Armstrong	United States	Iowa
1989	1	20	Jeff Sanders	United States	Georgia Southern
1990	2	29	Toni Kukoč	Yugoslavia (Note: Now a citizen of Croatia.)	KK Split (Yugoslavia)
1991	1	26	Mark Randall	United States	Kansas
1992	1	27	Byron Houston	United States	Oklahoma State
1992	2	33	Corey Williams	United States	Oklahoma State
1992	2	39	Litterial Green	United States	Georgia
1992	2	52	Matt Steigenga	United States	Michigan State
1993	1	25	Corie Blount	United States	Cincinnati
1993	2	41	Anthony Reed	United States	Tulane
1994	1	21	Dickey Simpkins	United States	Providence
1994	2	49	Kris Bruton	United States	Benedict
1995	1	20	Jason Caffey	United States	Alabama
1995	2	31	Dragan Tarlac	Yugoslavia (Note: Now a citizen of Serbia.)	Olympiacos (Greece)
1996	1	29	Travis Knight	United States	UConn
1997	1	28	Keith Booth	United States	Maryland
1997	2	57	Roberto Dueñas	Spain	FC Barcelona (Spain)
1998	1	28	Corey Benjamin	United States	Oregon State
1998	2	34	Shammond Williams	United States	North Carolina
1998	2	58	Maceo Baston	United States	Michigan
1999	1	1	Elton Brand	United States	Duke
1999	1	16	Ron Artest	United States	St. John's
1999	2	32	Michael Ruffin	United States	Tulsa
1999	2	49	Lari Ketner	United States	Massachusetts
2000	1	4	Marcus Fizer	United States	Iowa State
2000	1	7	Chris Mihm	United States	Texas
2000	1	24	Dalibor Bagaric	Croatia	Benston Zagreb (Croatia)
2000	2	32	A. J. Guyton	United States	Indiana
2000	2	33	Jake Voskuhl	United States	UConn
2000	2	34	Khalid El-Amin	United States	UConn
2001	1	4	Eddy Curry	United States	Thornwood High School (South Holland, Illinois)
2001	2	29	Trenton Hassell	United States	Austin Peay
2001	2	44	Sean Lampley	United States	California
2002	1	2	Jay Williams	United States	Duke
2002	2	30	Roger Mason Jr.	United States	Virginia
2002	2	43	Lonny Baxter	United States	Maryland
2002	2	53	Tommy Smith	United States	Arizona State
2003	1	7	Kirk Hinrich	United States	Kansas
2003	2	36	Mario Austin	United States	Mississippi State
2003	2	45	Matt Bonner	United States	Florida
2004	1	3	Ben Gordon	United States; United Kingdom (Note: Gordon was born in London, but raised in Mount Vernon, New York.)	UConn
2004	2	31	Jackson Vroman	Lebanon	Iowa State
2004	2	38	Chris Duhon	United States	Duke
2006	1	2	LaMarcus Aldridge	United States	Texas
2006	1	16	Rodney Carney	United States	Memphis
2007	1	9	Joakim Noah	United States; France (Note: Noah is a U.S. citizen by virtue of his birth in New York City. Shortly before the 2007 Draft, he acquired a French passport, qualifying through his father. He is also eligible for Swedish citizenship through his mother, and under FIBA rules is also eligible to play for Cameroon through his paternal grandfather. Noah has represented France internationally.)	Florida
2007	2	49	Aaron Gray	United States	Pittsburgh
2007	2	51	JamesOn Curry	United States	Oklahoma State
2008	1	1	Derrick Rose	United States	Memphis
2008	2	39	Sonny Weems	United States	Arkansas
2009	1	16	James Johnson	United States	Wake Forest
2009	1	26	Taj Gibson	United States	USC
2010	1	17	Kevin Séraphin	France	Cholet Basket (France)
2011	1	28	Norris Cole	United States	Cleveland State
2011	1	30	Jimmy Butler	United States	Marquette
2011	2	43	Malcolm Lee	United States	UCLA
2012	1	29	Marquis Teague	United States	Kentucky
2013	1	20	Tony Snell	United States	New Mexico
2013	2	49	Erik Murphy	United States; Finland	Florida
2014	1	16	Jusuf Nurkic	Bosnia and Herzegovina	Cedevita Zagreb (Croatia)
2014	1	19	Gary Harris	United States	Michigan State
2014	2	49	Cameron Bairstow	Australia	New Mexico
2015	1	22	Bobby Portis	United States	Arkansas
2016	1	14	Denzel Valentine	United States	Michigan State
2016	2	48	Paul Zipser	Germany	Bayern Munich (Germany)
2017	1	16	Justin Patton	United States	Creighton
2017	2	38	Jordan Bell	United States	Oregon
2018	1	7	Wendell Carter Jr.	United States	Duke
2018	1	22	Chandler Hutchison	United States	Boise State
2019	1	7	Coby White	United States	North Carolina
2019	2	38	Daniel Gafford	United States	Arkansas
2020	1	4	Patrick Williams	United States	Florida State
2020	2	44	Marko Simonović	Montenegro	Mega Soccerbet (Serbia)
2021	2	38	Ayo Dosunmu	United States	Illinois
2022	1	18	Dalen Terry	United States	Arizona
2023	2	35	Julian Phillips	United States	Tennessee
2024	1	11	Matas Buzelis	United States; Lithuania	NBA G League Ignite
2025	1	12	Noa Essengue	France	Ratiopharm Ulm (Germany)
2026	1	4	Caleb Wilson	United States	North Carolina
2026	1	15	Dailyn Swain	United States	Texas

== Notes and references ==
- "Chicago Bulls Draft Register". Basketball-Reference.com.
