= 1998–99 Chicago Bulls season =

NBA professional basketball team season

- Head coach: Tim Floyd
- General manager: Jerry Krause
- Owner: Jerry Reinsdorf
- Arena: United Center

Results
- Record: 13–37 (.260)
- Place: Division: 8th (Central); Conference: 15th (Eastern)
- Playoff finish: Did not qualify
- Stats at Basketball Reference

Local media
- Television: WGN-TV (Wayne Larrivee, John Paxson); Fox Sports Chicago (Tom Dore, John Paxson)
- Radio: WMVP (Neil Funk, Johnny "Red" Kerr)

The 1998–99 Chicago Bulls season was the 33rd season for the Chicago Bulls in the National Basketball Association. This was the first time since the 1993–94 season that Michael Jordan was not on the opening day roster, and for the first time since the 1986–87 season that Scottie Pippen was not on the opening day roster. Due to a lockout, the regular season began on February 5, 1999, and was cut from 82 games to 50 games.

== Season summary ==
=== Off-season ===
The Bulls entered the regular season as the three-time defending NBA champions, having defeated the Utah Jazz in the 1998 NBA Finals in six games, winning their sixth NBA championship, and completing a second three-peat in the 1990s. During the offseason, Phil Jackson's resignation as head coach, the departures of Pippen (who was traded to the Houston Rockets), Dennis Rodman (who signed with the Los Angeles Lakers as a free agent), and Jordan's second retirement marked the end of the Bulls' dynasty. During the off-season, the team signed free agents Brent Barry, and Andrew Lang, acquired Mark Bryant from the Phoenix Suns, and hired Tim Floyd as their new head coach.

=== Regular season ===
Under Floyd, and with the addition of Barry and Bryant, the Bulls were a shell of their former selves, losing eight of their first nine games of the regular season, which included a seven-game losing streak in February. The team posted another seven-game losing streak in April, and lost 14 of their final 17 games of the season. The Bulls finished in last place in the Central Division with a 13–37 record (roughly the equivalent of 21–61), missing the NBA playoffs for the first time since the 1983–84 season; the Bulls were just the second defending champions to miss the postseason, behind the 1969–70 Boston Celtics.

Toni Kukoč became the team's scoring leader, averaging 18.8 points, 7.0 rebounds, and 5.3 assists per game, while Ron Harper averaged 11.2 points, 5.1 rebounds and 1.7 steals per game, and Barry provided the team with 11.1 points per game. In addition, Dickey Simpkins contributed 9.1 points and 6.8 rebounds per game, while Bryant provided with 9.0 points and 5.2 rebounds per game, and Randy Brown contributed 8.8 points, 3.8 assists and 1.7 steals per game. Meanwhile, Hungarian rookie power forward Kornél Dávid averaged 6.2 points and 3.5 rebounds per game, second-year guard Rusty LaRue contributed 4.7 points per game, and Lang provided with 3.8 points and 4.4 rebounds per game, but only played just 21 games due to injury.

Brown finished tied in tenth place in Most Improved Player voting. The Bulls led the NBA in home-game attendance, with an attendance of 560,012 at the United Center during the regular season.

=== Notable highlights ===
One notable game of the regular season occurred on April 10, 1999, in which the Bulls suffered an 82–49 home loss to the Miami Heat at the United Center; the Bulls struggled and only made 18 out of 77 field-goal attempts, and shot just .234 in field-goal percentage. Dávid led the Bulls with a double-double of 13 points and 10 rebounds off the bench. It was an all-time NBA record for the fewest points scored in a single game, since the shot clock was introduced during the 1954–55 season.

Before that night's game, the NBA had only twelve notable moments where a team scored under 50 points in a match, where most of them occurred during the league's inaugural season, which was known as the Basketball Association of America, including two different matches where a team scored less than 40 points in a game. In addition, the two lowest scoring teams in a game happened in an infamous match on November 22, 1950, between the Fort Wayne Pistons and the Minneapolis Lakers, which resulted in the lowest-scoring NBA match ever recorded in a 19–18 Pistons victory.

=== Aftermath ===
Following the season, Barry was traded to the Seattle SuperSonics, while Harper signed as a free agent with the Los Angeles Lakers to reunite with Jackson, who was hired to coach the Lakers, Bryant signed with the Cleveland Cavaliers, and Lang and Bill Wennington were both released to free agency.

== Offseason ==
=== NBA draft ===
Round	Pick	Player	Position	Nationality	School/Club team
1	28	Corey Benjamin	SG	United States	Oregon State
2	34	Shammond Williams	PG	United States	North Carolina
2	58	Maceo Baston	F	United States	Michigan

== Roster ==
1998–99 Chicago Bulls roster
Players

Pos.	No.	Player	Height	Weight	DOB	From
G	31	Brent Barry	6 ft 6 in (1.98 m)	185 lb (84 kg)	1971–12–31	Oregon State
G	25	Corey Benjamin	6 ft 6 in (1.98 m)	200 lb (91 kg)	1978–02–24	Oregon State
F	44	Mario Bennett	6 ft 6 in (1.98 m)	235 lb (107 kg)	1973–08–01	Arizona State
F	22	Keith Booth	6 ft 6 in (1.98 m)	226 lb (103 kg)	1974–10–09	Maryland
G	1	Randy Brown	6 ft 2 in (1.88 m)	190 lb (86 kg)	1968–05–22	New Mexico State
F/C	2	Mark Bryant	6 ft 9 in (2.06 m)	245 lb (111 kg)	1965–04–25	Seton Hall
G	21	Cory Carr	6 ft 3 in (1.91 m)	210 lb (95 kg)	1975–12–05	Texas Tech
F	18	Kornél Dávid	6 ft 9 in (2.06 m)	235 lb (107 kg)	1971–10–22	Hungary
G/F	9	Ron Harper	6 ft 6 in (1.98 m)	185 lb (84 kg)	1964–01–20	Miami (OH)
G	11	Charles Jones	6 ft 3 in (1.91 m)	180 lb (82 kg)	1975–07–17	Long Island
F	7	Toni Kukoč	6 ft 10 in (2.08 m)	192 lb (87 kg)	1968–09–18	Croatia
C	28	Andrew Lang	6 ft 11 in (2.11 m)	245 lb (111 kg)	1966–06–28	Arkansas
F/C	8	Dickey Simpkins	6 ft 9 in (2.06 m)	248 lb (112 kg)	1972–04–06	Providence
C	34	Bill Wennington	7 ft 0 in (2.13 m)	245 lb (111 kg)	1963–04–26	St. John's

Coaches
Head coach
- Tim Floyd
Assistant(s)
- Bill Cartwright
- Frank Hamblen
- Tex Winter
- Jim Woolridge
- Fred Tedeschi (trainer)

Legend
- (DP) Unsigned draft pick
- (FA) Free agent
- (S) Suspended
- (IN) Inactive
- Injured

Roster
Updated: February 16, 1999

== Regular season ==
=== Season standings ===
Central Division	W	L	PCT	GB	Home	Road	Div	GP
y-Indiana Pacers	33	17	.660	–	18‍–‍7	15‍–‍10	15–7	50
x-Atlanta Hawks	31	19	.620	2.0	16‍–‍9	15‍–‍10	15–8	50
x-Detroit Pistons	29	21	.580	4.0	17‍–‍8	12‍–‍13	13–8	50
x-Milwaukee Bucks	28	22	.560	5.0	17‍–‍8	11‍–‍14	13–11	50
Charlotte Hornets	26	24	.520	7.0	16‍–‍9	10‍–‍15	12–10	50
Toronto Raptors	23	27	.460	10.0	14‍–‍11	9‍–‍16	9–14	50
Cleveland Cavaliers	22	28	.440	11.0	15‍–‍10	7‍–‍18	9–13	50
Chicago Bulls	13	37	.260	20.0	8‍–‍17	5‍–‍20	4–19	50

Eastern Conference
#	Team	W	L	PCT	GB	GP
1	c-Miami Heat *	33	17	.660	–	50
2	y-Indiana Pacers *	33	17	.660	–	50
3	x-Orlando Magic	33	17	.660	–	50
4	x-Atlanta Hawks	31	19	.620	2.0	50
5	x-Detroit Pistons	29	21	.580	4.0	50
6	x-Philadelphia 76ers	28	22	.560	5.0	50
7	x-Milwaukee Bucks	28	22	.560	5.0	50
8	x-New York Knicks	27	23	.540	6.0	50
9	Charlotte Hornets	26	24	.520	7.0	50
10	Toronto Raptors	23	27	.460	10.0	50
11	Cleveland Cavaliers	22	28	.440	11.0	50
12	Boston Celtics	19	31	.380	14.0	50
13	Washington Wizards	18	32	.360	15.0	50
14	New Jersey Nets	16	34	.320	17.0	50
15	Chicago Bulls	13	37	.260	20.0	50

== Player statistics ==
Legend
GP	Games played	GS	Games started	MPG	Minutes per game
FG%	Field-goal percentage	3P%	3-point field-goal percentage	FT%	Free-throw percentage
RPG	Rebounds per game	APG	Assists per game	SPG	Steals per game
BPG	Blocks per game	PPG	Points per game

=== Regular season ===
Player	GP	GS	MPG	FG%	3P%	FT%	RPG	APG	SPG	BPG	PPG
Brent Barry	37	30	31.9	.396	.302	.772	3.9	3.1	1.1	.3	11.1
Corey Benjamin	31	1	10.3	.376	.214	.675	1.3	.3	.4	.3	3.8
Mario Bennett	3	0	6.3	.333		.750	1.7	.0	.3	.0	2.3
Keith Booth	39	4	11.1	.325	.100	.500	2.4	1.0	.6	.3	3.1
Randy Brown	39	32	29.2	.414	.000	.757	3.4	3.8	1.7	.2	8.8
Mark Bryant	45	29	26.8	.483	.000	.645	5.2	1.1	.8	.4	9.0
Cory Carr	42	7	14.9	.329	.167	.750	1.2	1.6	.5	.2	4.1
Kornél Dávid	50	6	18.0	.449	.000	.811	3.5	.8	.5	.3	6.2
Ron Harper	35	35	31.6	.377	.318	.703	5.1	3.3	1.7	1.0	11.2
Charles Jones	29	5	16.4	.317	.311	.500	1.4	1.4	.6	.2	3.7
Toni Kukoč	44	44	37.6	.420	.285	.740	7.0	5.3	1.1	.3	18.8
Andrew Lang	21	13	18.4	.323		.696	4.4	.6	.2	.6	3.8
Rusty LaRue	43	6	17.0	.359	.337	1.000	1.3	1.5	.8	.1	4.7
Dickey Simpkins	50	35	29.0	.463	.000	.645	6.8	1.3	.7	.3	9.1
Bill Wennington	38	3	11.9	.348	1.000	.818	2.1	.5	.3	.3	3.8

Player statistics citation:

== Awards and records ==
In a home game against the Miami Heat on April 10, 1999, the Bulls scored 49 points, the fewest by any team since the shot clock was introduced in 1954.

== Transactions ==
Players added

Via draft

- Corey Benjamin

Via trade

- Mario Bennett
- Mark Bryant
- Andrew Lang

Via free agency

- Brent Barry
- Kornél Dávid
Players lost

Via trade

- Steve Kerr
- Luc Longley
- Scottie Pippen

Via free agency

- Jud Buechler
- Scott Burrell
- Joe Kleine
- Dennis Rodman

Retired

- Michael Jordan
