= John Baum =

John Baum may refer to:

- Johnny Baum (born 1946), American basketball player
- John Baum, alias of John Connor in the television series Terminator: The Sarah Connor Chronicles
