= Derek Cooke =

American basketball player (born 1991)

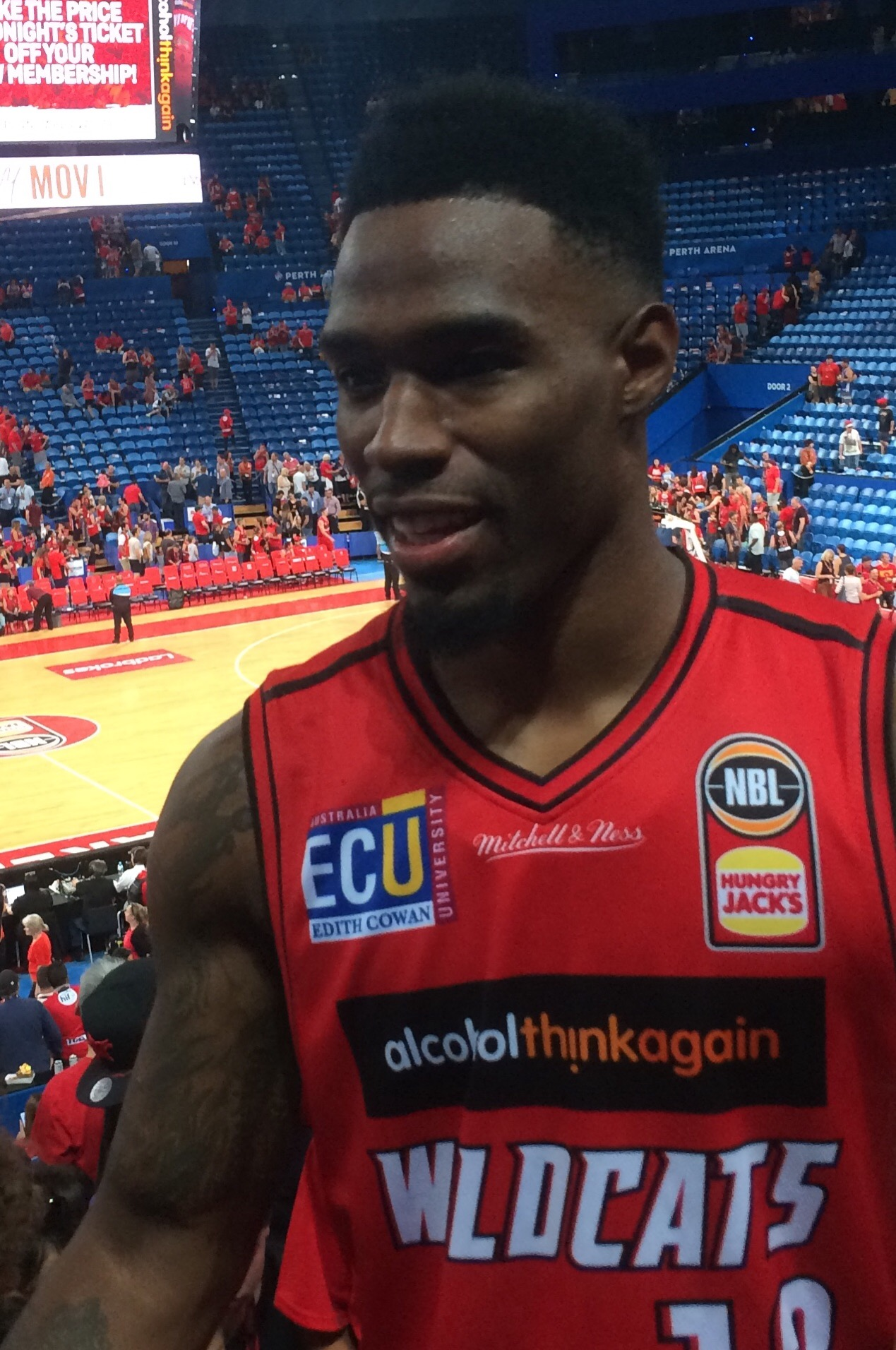
- Cooke in December 2017

Free agent
- Position: Power forward / center

Personal information
- Born: August 23, 1991 (age 35) Washington, D.C., U.S.
- Listed height: 2.06 m (6 ft 9 in)
- Listed weight: 100 kg (220 lb)

Career information
- High school: Friendly (Fort Washington, Maryland)
- College: Cloud County CC (2011–2012); Wyoming (2012–2015)
- NBA draft: 2015: undrafted
- Playing career: 2015–present

Career history
- 2015: Rethymno Cretan Kings
- 2015–2017: Bakersfield Jam / Northern Arizona Suns
- 2017–2018: Perth Wildcats
- 2018–2019: Northern Arizona Suns
- 2019: Raptors 905
- 2019: Hamilton Honey Badgers
- 2019–2020: Trieste
- 2020: Hamilton Honey Badgers
- 2021: Tsmoki-Minsk
- 2021: Brose Bamberg
- 2021–2022: Hapoel Gilboa Galil
- 2022–2023: Treviso Basket
- 2023: Skyliners Frankfurt
- 2023–2024: Dolomiti Energia Trento
- 2024: Força Lleida
- 2025: Pistoia Basket 2000
- Stats at Basketball Reference

Derek Vincent Cooke Jr. (born August 23, 1991) is an American professional basketball player who last played for the Pistoia Basket 2000 of the Lega Basket Serie A (LBA). He played three years of Division I college basketball for Wyoming.

== High school career ==
Cooke attended Friendly High School in Fort Washington, Maryland, where he was a wide receiver on the football team and did not play basketball. An NCAA qualifier after graduating, he decided to take a year off from school and also hit a growth spurt, before enrolling at Cloud County Community College to play basketball.

== College career ==
Cooke spent one year at Cloud County CC. During his freshman season, he helped the Thunderbirds to a 25–8 overall record. Cloud County went 11–5 in the Kansas Jayhawk Community College Conference and advanced to the semifinals of the NJCAA Division I Region VI Tournament. Cooke notched team highs of 8.4 rebounds, 1.7 blocks and 55 percent from the floor to go with 6.0 points and nearly one steal per game.

In 2012, Cooke transferred to Wyoming. During his senior season, Cooke averaged 8.1 points and 5.8 rebounds while helping the Cowboys reach the NCAA tournament for the first time since 2002.

== Professional career ==
=== Rethymno Cretan Kings (2015) ===
After going undrafted in the 2015 NBA draft, on June 25, 2015, Cooke signed with the Rethymno Cretan Kings of the Greek Basket League. However, he parted ways with the club in late October after appearing in just three games.

=== Northern Arizona Suns (2015–2017) ===
On November 2, 2015, he was acquired by the Bakersfield Jam of the NBA Development League.

In July 2016, Cooke joined the Phoenix Suns for the 2016 NBA Summer League. On September 25, 2016, he signed with the Suns, but was waived on October 10. On October 31, 2016, he was acquired by the Northern Arizona Suns as an affiliate player of Phoenix.

=== Perth Wildcats (2017–2018) ===
On July 27, 2017, Cooke signed with the Perth Wildcats for the 2017–18 NBL season. He appeared in all 30 games for the Wildcats in 2017–18, averaging 5.7 points and 5.5 rebounds per game.

=== Second stint with Northern Arizona Suns (2018–2019) ===
Cooke re-joined the Northern Arizona Suns in October 2018.

=== Raptors 905 (2019) ===
On January 15, 2019, the Raptors 905 acquired Cooke from the Northern Arizona Suns for Khadeem Lattin and the returning rights to Yanick Moreira.

=== Hamilton Honey Badgers (2019) ===
After the conclusion of the 2018–19 NBA G League season, Cooke was drafted into the startup Canadian Elite Basketball League's Hamilton Honey Badgers, where he would reunite with former Raptors 905 teammates, MiKyle McIntosh and Duane Notice.

=== Pallacanestro Trieste (2019–2020) ===
On July 14, 2019, he has signed with Pallacanestro Trieste of the Lega Basket Serie A (LBA).

=== Canadian Elite Basketball League (2020) ===
In July 2020, Cooke joined the Hamilton Honey Badgers for the 2020 CEBL season.

=== Tsmoki-Minsk (2021) ===
On January 2, 2021, he signed with Tsmoki-Minsk of the VTB United League.

=== Brose Bamberg (2021) ===
On July 30, 2021, he signed with Brose Bamberg of the Basketball Bundesliga (BBL).

=== Hapoel Gilboa Galil (2021–2022) ===
On October 25, 2021, he signed with Hapoel Gilboa Galil of the Israeli Premier League.

=== Treviso Basket (2022–2023) ===
On July 21, 2022, he has signed with Treviso Basket of the Lega Basket Serie A (LBA).

=== Skyliners Frankfurt (2023) ===
On February 28, 2023, he signed with Skyliners Frankfurt of the Basketball Bundesliga.

=== Aquila Basket Trento (2023–2024) ===
On August 5, 2023, he signed with Dolomiti Energia Trento of the Italian Lega Basket Serie A (LBA).

=== Força Lleida (2024) ===
On September 12, 2024, Cooke signed with the Força Lleida of the Liga ACB. On December 9, 2024, his contract was terminated.

=== Pistoia Basket 2000 (2025) ===
On January 1, 2025, Cooke signed with the Pistoia Basket 2000 of the Lega Basket Serie A (LBA).
