= Tim Andree =

American chief executive

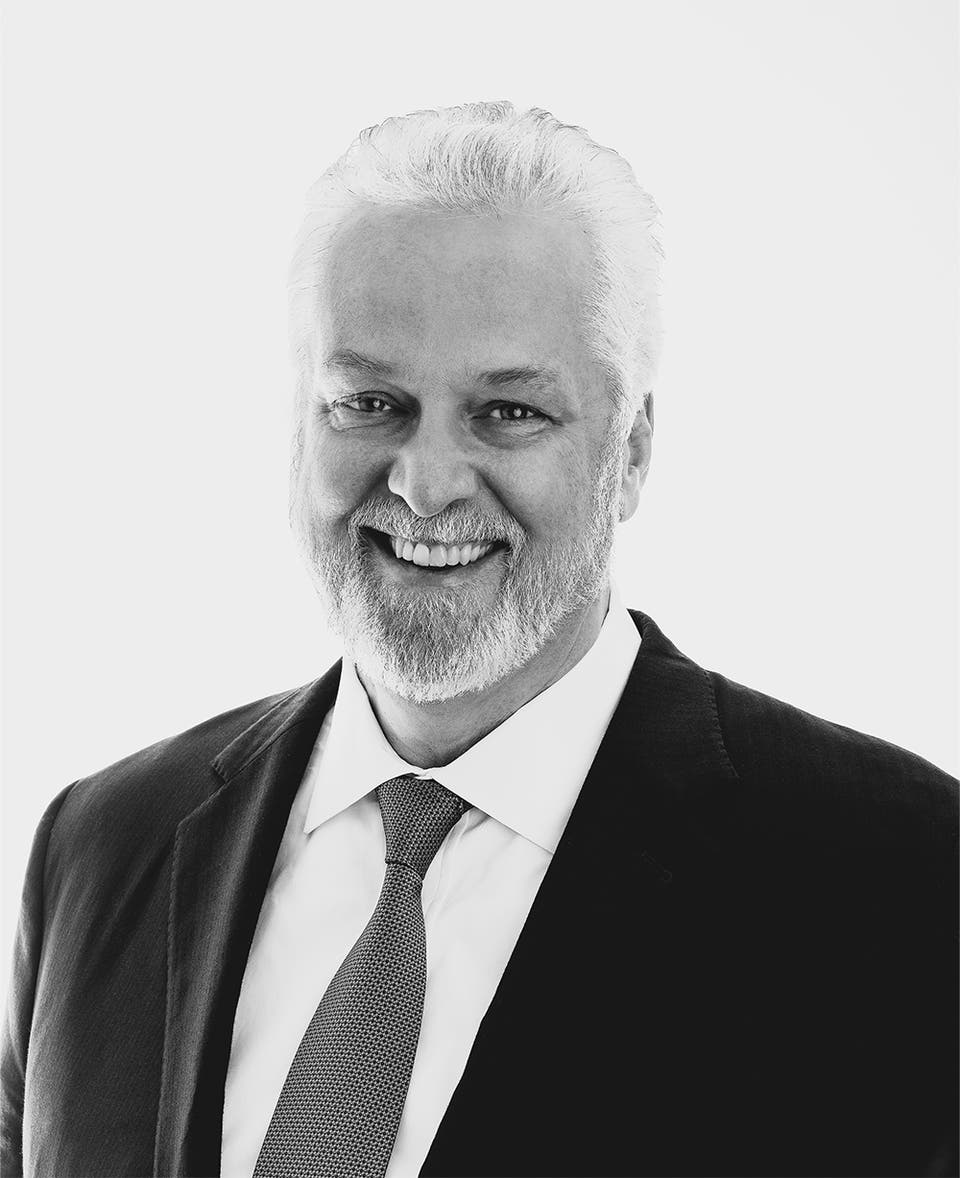
- Born: 1961 or 1962 (age 64–65); Detroit, Michigan, U.S.
- Education: University of Notre Dame
- Employers: Dentsu, Inc.; Dentsu Aegis Network
- Height: 6 ft 11 in (211 cm)
- Children: 6

Tim Andree is the executive vice president and director of Dentsu, Inc., and the executive chairman and chief executive officer of its subsidiary, Dentsu Aegis Network, as well as a former professional basketball player. He played in the McDonald's All-American Game in 1979 and was drafted to the National Basketball Association (NBA) in 1983. Andree played professional basketball in Italy, Japan, Monaco, and Spain. Before joining Dentsu in 2006, he worked for Toyota, Canon Inc., BASF, and the NBA.

== Early life and education ==
Andree was born in Detroit. He was raised in a religious household as the youngest of twelve children. His father worked as a union ironworker, janitor, and butcher. Andree attended Brother Rice High School, an all-boys Catholic school. In 1979, he was a finalist for Mr. Basketball of Michigan (then known as Retro Mr. Basketball), which recognizes Michigan's best high school senior male basketball players. Andree received a basketball scholarship from the University of Notre Dame. He attended the university from 1979 to 1983, and earned a bachelor's degree in economics.

== Career ==
=== Basketball ===
Andree played in the McDonald's All-American Game in 1979. He was drafted to the National Basketball Association (NBA) in 1983 by the Chicago Bulls but was waived by the club before the start of the season. He played professional basketball for leagues outside the United States, including Italy, Monaco, and Spain.

In 1985, he joined the Toyota Pacers; as part of his contract, he worked in Toyota's Tokyo-based global sales office, wanting to acquire business experience and expertise. He played for the Toyota Pacers for five years.

=== Executive ===
Toyota moved Andree from Japan to New York City, where he oversaw corporate advertising, investor relations, and public affairs for North America. Andree worked for Toyota for thirteen years (including eight in New York), before accepting a marketing and communications position at Canon Inc.'s New York office. He then worked for The Dilenschneider Group, a private equity firm, before heading to chemical company BASF as vice president of corporate communications in 2001. In 2002, Andree returned to the NBA, this time as senior vice president of communications, where he also handled crisis communication for incidents such as the Pacers–Pistons brawl.

Andree joined DCA Advertising (now known as Dentsu America) in 2006, where he w as chief executive from 2006 to 2010. He became the first non-Japanese executive officer in 2008, and was appointed president and chief executive of Dentsu Holdings USA, adding responsibility for all operations in the Americas. He held Dentsu Network West's chief executive position from 2010 to 2012, overseeing the company's operations in the Americas, Europe, and Australia. In 2012, Andree was named senior vice president of Dentsu Inc., and chief executive of the Dentsu Network, a newly created organization for Dentsu's operations outside Japan. He was leading Dentsu's global operations and working from an office in Tribeca, as of 2012, and held the senior vice president of Dentsu Inc. role until 2013. After Dentsu acquired Aegis Group during 2012–2013, forming Dentsu Aegis Network, Andree held the executive chairman role and was promoted to executive vice president of Dentsu Inc. That same year, he was also appointed the first non-Japanese executive on Dentsu's board of directors. In 2019, he became the chief executive as well, replacing Jerry Buhlmann. Andree is a member of Dentsu Aegis Network's board, and is executive vice president of Dentsu Inc. He has been credited with helping Dentsu acquire many companies, including Aegis Group plc.

== Personal life ==
Andree and his wife have six children. The couple met in college, and lived together in Japan, along with their oldest son, before relocating to the New York metropolitan area. The family lived in Colts Neck Township, New Jersey, as of 2012.

Andree speaks some Japanese. As part of a tradition for many Dentsu employees, he climbed Mount Fuji in 2007.

== Publications ==
- Sugiyama, Kotaro; Andree, Tim (2010). The Dentsu Way: Secrets of Cross Switch Marketing from the World's Most Innovative Advertising Agency. McGraw Hill Professional. ISBN 9780071752787.

== See also ==
- 1979–80 Notre Dame Fighting Irish men's basketball team
- 1983–84 Chicago Bulls season
- Chicago Bulls draft history
- List of 1982–83 NBA season transactions
