= Friendly High School =

Location
- 10000 Allentown Road; Fort Washington, Maryland 20744; United States; 38°45′8″N 76°58′7″W

Information
- School type: Public
- Founded: 1970
- School district: Prince George's County Public Schools
- Principal: Robin Pope-Brown
- Grades: 9-12
- Enrollment: 1,034
- Average class size: 1:31
- Colors: Blue and Red
- Nickname: Patriots
- Rivals: Gwynn Park High School
- Feeder schools: Isaac J Gourdine Middle School Eugene Burroughs Middle School
- Website: Friendly High School

Friendly High School is a public high school in Friendly census-designated place in unincorporated Prince George's County, a county in the state of Maryland in the United States; it has a Fort Washington postal address.

The school's first classes began in 1970 with 9th, 10th and 11th grades. Friendly graduated its first seniors in 1972, while housing students in grades 10–12. In 1981 a 9th grade class was added at that point the high school had 9th, 10th, 11th and 12th grades and Jr. high schools were then renamed Middle Schools and consisted of 7th and 8th grades.

Friendly serves: the Friendly CDP, and sections of the Fort Washington and Oxon Hill CDPs, as well as a small portion of the Clinton CDP.

== History ==
In 2009 Sheryll Cashin said in The Failures of Integration: How Race and Class are Undermining the American Dream that Friendly High was one of several mostly black, mostly middle class PG County public high schools that was "decidedly underachieving: fewer than half of the seniors at these schools went on to attend four-year colleges in recent years."

== School uniforms ==
Friendly has a mandatory school uniform policy that began with the 2006–2007 school year.

== School championships ==
The school has won State Championships in the sports of Basketball in 1998, 2003 and 2004, Football and, in the 1970s, 1980s, 1990s, and in 2006 Indoor and Outdoor track. During the 2006 football season, the Patriots were undefeated, and ended their perfect season by winning the 3A state championship by beating River Hill High School on December 9, 2006, led by star quarterback Joe Haden (Florida). They also did the same in 1998 beating Eastern Technical High School. Won the state football championship in 1974 and 1978. In 1974, the team was led by running back Byron Stewart (Nebraska).

In 1977, the Friendly High School Cross Country team finished its season undefeated, and unscored upon for five years in a row. Coach of the team was Marvin Vann, assistant principal.

In 1996, the boys' basketball team took the 3A/2A/1A playoffs by storm winning the County Championship. After that they went on to win MD State Championship game beating City College high school of Baltimore, ending the season with a 13–15 record and being known as the Cinderella team of 1998

From 1997 to 2000, the boys' basketball team won back-to-back-to-back county championships led by lefty streaky shooter and Hall of Famer Tony Reid (Virginia State University), under the leadership of Coach Gerald Moore Jr.

Friendly High School has produced an Olympic Champion and World Record Holder, Mark Henderson (class of 1987), NBA and European professional basketball players Dickey Simpkins (Providence), Sam Young (Pitt), Jamal Shivers (Bowie State), Tony Reid (Virginia State University), and more. Calvin Tiggle class of 1987 played linebacker for the Tampa Bay Buccaneers and went on to play in the Canadian Football League with the Hamilton Tiger-Cats, winning the Grey Cup (equivalent of the Super Bowl) in 1999, and, Robert Green class of 1988 played football for The Washington Redskins and two other NFL teams.

Friendly High School has won two Maryland Public Secondary Schools Athletic Association championships (1998 & 2006) under the leadership of coach George Early in football and (1998, 2006) under Coach Gerald Moore Jr in basketball.

In 2008 the baseball team had a resurgence, winning the County 3A/2A/1A title. That year they lost the County Championship game to a very talented Eleanor Roosevelt high school team.

In 2011, the boys' basketball team made it back to the County 3A/2A/1A title after losing it two years previously to Laurel High School. They defeated Henry Wise claiming the County 3A/2A/1A title.

Friendly High School is in a suburban area near Washington D.C. approximately 6 miles down Maryland Route 210.

== Notable alumni ==
- Roslyn Brock, NAACP chairman
- Derek Cooke (born 1991), basketball player for Hapoel Gilboa Galil of the Israeli Basketball Premier League
- Dave Dorman, illustrator
- Robert Green, NFL player
- Joe Haden, NFL player
- Mark Henderson, Olympic champion swimmer
- Tim Hightower, NFL Runningback, Arizona Cardinals, Washington Redskins
- Leon Joe, football player
- Martin Lawrence, actor
- Dickey Simpkins, basketball player
- Calvin Tiggle, American football & Canadian football
- Sam Young, professional basketball player
