= Larry Humes =

American audiologist

Larry Humes is a Distinguished Professor of Hearing Sciences at Indiana University Bloomington.

== Education ==
Dr. Humes completed his undergraduate work in 1975 at Purdue University, which was followed by a master's degree from Central Michigan University in 1976, and, finally, a doctorate from Northwestern University in 1979.

== Career ==
After an eight-year tenure as a faculty member at Vanderbilt University, he came to Indiana University in 1996. Dr. Humes has publishing over 160 papers and giving over 230 presentations on his research worldwide. Much of his research in recent years has focused on evaluating treatment for speech-perception deficits, age-related changes to auditory perception and outcome measures for hearing aids. He serves as a Fellow of the American Speech-Language-Hearing Association and the Acoustical Society of America. He has received the Alfred E. Kawana Award for Lifetime Achievement from the ASHA and the James Jerger Career Award and Presidential Award from the American Academy of Audiology. Throughput his career, Dr. Humes has served on a variety of editorial board for peer reviewed journals including the Journal of the American Academy of Audiology, Australian Journal of Audiology, Journal of Speech, Language and Hearing Research, and American Journal of Audiology.
