= A. W. Holt =

American basketball player

Personal information
- Born: August 26, 1946 (age 80)
- Listed height: 6 ft 7 in (2.01 m)
- Listed weight: 210 lb (95 kg)

Career information
- High school: Brinkley (Jackson, Mississippi)
- College: Jackson State (1966–1969)
- NBA draft: 1969: undrafted
- Playing career: 1969–1971
- Position: Small forward
- Number: 6

Career history
- 1969–1970: Scranton Miners
- 1970–1971: Chicago Bulls
- 1970–1971: →Northwest Travelers

Career highlights
- First-team All-SWAC (1969)
- Stats at NBA.com
- Stats at Basketball Reference

Alvin William Holt (born August 26, 1946) is an American former professional basketball player. He played as a small forward and spent one season in the National Basketball Association (NBA) as a member of the Chicago Bulls in 1970–71. Holt played college basketball for the Jackson State Tigers.

== College career ==
Holt attended Jackson State University. Playing for the Tigers, he was selected to the All-Southwestern Athletic Conference (SWAC) team in 1969.

== Professional career ==
Holt was selected by the Dallas Chaparrals in the 1969 American Basketball Association (ABA) draft. He tried out for the team but joined the Scranton Miners of the Eastern Professional Basketball League for the 1969–70 season. The Miners had a "clearly chaotic" situation during Holt's tenure with a nine-game losing streak, five head coaches and cuts to player salaries mid-season. Holt was fined by the Miners for missing practices but refused to pay and left the team.

Holt attended rookie camp with the Phoenix Suns of the NBA and New York Nets of the ABA in June 1970. In August 1970, he joined the Chicago Bulls for their training camp. In October, he was announced as having made the Bulls' final roster for the 1970–71 NBA season; he earned his spot because of his "strong rebounding, leaping ability and overall desire and hustle." On December 18, Holt was assigned to the Northwest Travelers of the Continental Basketball Association. On January 25, 1971, Holt was waived by the Bulls.

== Career statistics ==
Legend
GP	Games played	GS	Games started	MPG	Minutes per game
FG%	Field goal percentage	3P%	3-point field goal percentage	FT%	Free throw percentage
RPG	Rebounds per game	APG	Assists per game	SPG	Steals per game
BPG	Blocks per game	PPG	Points per game	**Bold**	Career high

=== NBA ===
==== Regular season ====
Year	Team	GP	GS	MPG	FG%	FT%	RPG	APG	PPG
1970–71	Chicago	6	0	2.3	.125	.667	.7	.0	.7
