= Kornél Dávid =

Hungarian basketball player (born 1971)

Personal information
- Born: October 22, 1971 (age 55) Nagykanizsa, Hungary
- Listed height: 6 ft 9 in (2.06 m)
- Listed weight: 235 lb (107 kg)

Career information
- NBA draft: 1993: undrafted
- Playing career: 1987–2008
- Position: Power forward
- Number: 18, 9

Career history
- 1987–1988: Budapest Honvéd
- 1988–1990: Malév SC
- 1990–1994: Budapest Honvéd
- 1994–1997: Albacomp
- 1997: Rockford Lightning
- 1998–1999: Albacomp
- 1999–2000: Chicago Bulls
- 2000: Cleveland Cavaliers
- 2000: Albacomp
- 2000–2001: Toronto Raptors
- 2001: Detroit Pistons
- 2001–2002: Strasbourg IG
- 2002–2003: BC Žalgiris
- 2003–2006: TAU Cerámica
- 2006–2008: CB Gran Canaria

Career highlights
- Trofeo Gobierno de Canarias champion (2007, 2008); 2× Spanish Cup champion (2004, 2006); 2× Spanish Supercup champion (2005, 2006); Lithuanian League champion (2003); 3× Hungarian League champion (1993, 1994, 1999); Hungarian Cup champion (1999); No. 9 retired by Alba Fehérvár
- Stats at NBA.com
- Stats at Basketball Reference

Kornél Dávid (born October 22, 1971) is a Hungarian former professional basketball player. He is so far the only Hungarian ever to play in the NBA.

== Early life ==
Dávid debuted for Budapest Honvéd during the 1987–88 season. He was signed for 1988–89 by Malév SC and played there also the 1989–90 season. In the 1990–91 season, he went back to Budapesti Honvéd and played there until the 1993–94 championship. In 1994, Albacomp (Székesfehérvár) recruited Dávid and was his team up to the 1996–97 championship season.

== NBA career ==
Dávid was signed by the Chicago Bulls on October 1, 1997, and waived on October 28. He then spent part of the 1997–98 season with the Rockford Lightning in the CBA but was released in December 1997. He later moved back to Hungary and was signed for the remainder of the season by Albacomp Székesfehérvár, winning the 1997-98 Hungarian National Championship. He would also spend part of the next season with Albacomp Székesfehérvár.

On 21 January 1999, Dávid was signed as a free agent by the Chicago Bulls and was waived in January 2000. A few days later, he signed the first of two consecutive 10-day contracts with the Cleveland Cavaliers. He then moved back to Hungary in February and was signed for the remainder of the season by Albacomp Székesfehérvár. Again Dávid would bring accolades by leading Albacomp Székesfehérvár to the 2000 Hungarian National Cup. Next, Dávid signed as a free agent by the Toronto Raptors in August 2000 and was then traded to the Detroit Pistons in February 2001.

Dávid played 109 NBA games, starting 11, averaging 5.0 points and 2.8 rebounds per game. A retrospective short documentary about his NBA career entitled Kornél on Tour was produced in 2017.

== Post-NBA career ==
He moved to France for the 2001–02 season, signing in November with Strasbourg IG. Later, Dávid moved to BC Žalgiris of Lithuania for the 2002–03 season, and promptly captured the Lithuanian National Championship.

He went to Spain for the 2003–04 season, donning jersey number 18 for TAU Cerámica. Dávid played a decisive role in the team's first Final Four appearance. He averaged 10.3 points and 4.2 rebounds in the regular season, but his numbers went up to 14.5 points and 5.3 rebounds in the Top 16, helping Tau to reach the playoffs. In October 2010 he was appointed as the director of international scouting for the Phoenix Suns.

In December 2012, Dávid became the president of the Hungarian club Alba Fehérvár.

== Personal ==
He is married to handball player Fruzsina Azari. Their first born son, Dalton Barnabás was born in July 2017. Their second son Benedikt Mór was also born in July, in 2021.

== Career statistics ==
Legend
GP	Games played	GS	Games started	MPG	Minutes per game
FG%	Field-goal percentage	3P%	3-point field-goal percentage	FT%	Free-throw percentage
RPG	Rebounds per game	APG	Assists per game	SPG	Steals per game
BPG	Blocks per game	PPG	Points per game	PIR	Performance index rating
**Bold**	Career high	*	Led the league

=== NBA ===
Year	Team	GP	GS	MPG	FG%	3P%	FT%	RPG	APG	SPG	BPG	PPG
1998–99	Chicago	**50***	**6**	**18.0**	.449	.000	.811	**3.5**	**.8**	.5	**.3**	6.2
1999–00	Chicago	26	5	17.0	.426	.000	.808	2.8	.6	.5	.1	**6.5**
1999–00	Cleveland	6	0	5.2	.444	–	.750	1.3	.2	**.7**	.2	1.8
2000–01	Toronto	17	0	8.2	**.517**	–	**.923**	1.9	.2	.1	.2	2.5
2000–01	Detroit	10	0	6.9	.455	–	–	1.9	.3	.4	.1	2.0
Career		109	11	14.5	.446	.000	.817	2.8	.6	.4	.2	5.0

=== Euroleague ===
Year	Team	GP	GS	MPG	FG%	3P%	FT%	RPG	APG	SPG	BPG	PPG	PIR
2002–03	Žalgiris	13	13	33.0	.536	1.000	.793	8.2	1.1	.9	.8	16.9	21.8
2003–04	TAU Cerámica	20	17	28.1	.523	.333	.773	5.3	1.8	1.1	.5	12.2	13.2
2004–05	TAU Cerámica	23	15	26.1	.529	.500	.888	4.9	1.0	.8	.5	10.9	12.7
2005–06	TAU Cerámica	25	13	21.1	.500	.200	.853	4.8	.5	1.0	.5	9.1	10.3

== See also ==
- List of foreign NBA players
