= Corey Benjamin =

American basketball player (born 1978)

Personal information
- Born: February 24, 1978 (age 48) Compton, California, U.S.
- Listed height: 6 ft 6 in (1.98 m)
- Listed weight: 200 lb (91 kg)

Career information
- High school: Fontana (Fontana, California)
- College: Oregon State (1996–1998)
- NBA draft: 1998: 1st round, 28th overall pick
- Drafted by: Chicago Bulls
- Playing career: 1998–2008
- Position: Guard
- Number: 25

Career history
- 1998–2001: Chicago Bulls
- 2001: Sutor Montegranaro
- 2002: Liaoning Flying Leopards
- 2002: Southern California Surf
- 2003: Atlanta Hawks
- 2002–2003: North Charleston Lowgators
- 2003–2004: Chalonnais
- 2004–2005: Xinjiang Flying Tigers
- 2005–2006: Guaros de Lara
- 2006: Conquistadores de Guaynabo
- 2006–2007: Benfica
- 2007–2008: Daegu Orions

Career highlights
- Pac-10 All-Freshman Team (1997); Second-team Parade All-American (1996); McDonald's All-American (1996); California Mr. Basketball (1996)

Career statistics
- Points: 835 (5.5 ppg)
- Rebounds: 259 (1.7 rpg)
- Assists: 143 (0.9 apg)
- Stats at NBA.com
- Stats at Basketball Reference

Corey Dwight Benjamin (born February 24, 1978) is an American former professional basketball player who played in the NBA from 1998 to 2003. He graduated from Fontana High School in Fontana, California, then played college basketball for Oregon State University, and was selected by the Chicago Bulls in the first round (28th overall) of the 1998 NBA draft.

== NBA career ==
Benjamin stayed with the Bulls for three seasons, and during the 2002–03 campaign, he signed a pair of 10-day contracts to play for the Atlanta Hawks. Between his stints with Chicago and Atlanta, he played for Sutor Montegranaro in Italy, and the Southern California Surf in the American Basketball Association. He also suited up for the North Charleston Lowgators in the NBDL (now known as the NBA G League).

Benjamin is also known for an incident where he mentioned to teammate Randy Brown that he could beat Michael Jordan in a one-on-one game. Jordan had just retired, but he showed up at a Bulls practice to completely embarrass Benjamin in an 11–3 rout.

== International career ==
Benjamin spent the final five years of his career playing abroad, first heading to France's Ligue Nationale de Basketball with Chalonnais for the 2003–04 season, followed by a stint in China for the Xinjiang Flying Tigers of the Chinese Basketball Association in 2004–05.

Heading to Latin America for the 2005–06 campaign, Benjamin next joined the Guaros de Lara in Venezuela's Liga Profesional de Baloncesto, followed by a spell in Puerto Rico's Baloncesto Superior Nacional with the Conquistadores de Guaynabo.

Benjamin then returned to Europe to play for Benfica in Portugal during the 2006–07 season. He wrapped up his overseas career with a second stint in Asia the following winter, going to South Korea to compete in the Korean Basketball League with the Daegu Orions.

== Career statistics ==
Legend
GP	Games played	GS	Games started	MPG	Minutes per game
FG%	Field goal percentage	3P%	3-point field goal percentage	FT%	Free throw percentage
RPG	Rebounds per game	APG	Assists per game	SPG	Steals per game
BPG	Blocks per game	PPG	Points per game	**Bold**	Career high

=== NBA ===
Year	Team	GP	GS	MPG	FG%	3P%	FT%	RPG	APG	SPG	BPG	PPG
1998–99	Chicago	31	1	10.3	.376	.214	.675	1.3	0.3	0.4	0.3	3.8
1999–00	Chicago	48	**10**	**18.0**	**.414**	**.348**	.598	1.8	**1.1**	**0.6**	**0.5**	**7.7**
2000–01	Chicago	**65**	5	13.2	.381	.259	.675	1.5	**1.1**	0.4	0.2	4.7
2002–03	Atlanta	9	0	16.9	.302	.154	**.750**	**3.4**	**1.1**	0.1	0.2	4.4
Career		153	16	14.3	.390	.289	.652	1.7	0.9	0.5	0.3	5.5

=== College ===
Year	Team	GP	GS	MPG	FG%	3P%	FT%	RPG	APG	SPG	BPG	PPG
1996-97	Oregon State	23	17	26.1	.432	**.315**	.653	4.0	1.3	1.1	0.5	14.9
1997–98	Oregon State	**25**	**22**	**26.9**	**.539**	.293	**.713**	**5.0**	**2.2**	**1.9**	**0.7**	**19.8**
Career		48	39	26.5	.491	.305	.688	4.5	1.8	1.5	0.6	17.5

== Personal life ==
While a member of the Oregon State Beavers, Benjamin played on the same team as his older brother, Sonny.

In 2000 Benjamin was arrested and charged with one count of domestic battery. He was arrested again in 2016.

In 2021, Benjamin apologised after a video of his daughter punching another player during a basketball game went viral.
