= Paul Ruffner =

American basketball player

Personal information
- Born: October 15, 1948 Downey, California, U.S.
- Died: June 17, 2022 (aged 73) Provo, Utah, U.S.
- Listed height: 6 ft 10 in (2.08 m)
- Listed weight: 225 lb (102 kg)

Career information
- High school: Warren (Downey, California)
- College: Cerritos (1966–1968); BYU (1968–1970)
- NBA draft: 1970: 2nd round, 28th overall pick
- Drafted by: Chicago Bulls
- Playing career: 1970–1975
- Position: Power forward / center
- Number: 44, 15, 22

Career history
- 1970–1971: Chicago Bulls
- 1971–1972: Pittsburgh Condors
- 1973–1975: Buffalo Braves
- 1975: Spirits of St. Louis
- Stats at NBA.com
- Stats at Basketball Reference

Paul Alex Ruffner (October 15, 1948 – June 17, 2022) was an American basketball player who played in both the American Basketball Association (ABA) and the National Basketball Association (NBA).

Ruffner was born on in Downey, California. He played basketball at Earl Warren High School in Downey, California.

A 6'10" center, Ruffner played college basketball for Cerritos College and then for Brigham Young University. He was selected for the Junior College Olympic Trials basketball team in 1968. The Chicago Bulls selected Ruffner in the second round of the 1970 NBA draft and the Virginia Squires selected him in the 1970 ABA draft. Ruffner signed with the Bulls.

Ruffner played his rookie season, 1970–71, with the Bulls. Ruffner played for the Pittsburgh Condors of the ABA in the next season. After a year out of both leagues, Ruffner played during the 1973–74 and 1974–75 seasons for the NBA's Buffalo Braves. Ruffner then landed with the Baltimore Claws but the team folded after a few preseason exhibition games. Ruffner concluded his professional career in the final season before the ABA–NBA merger by appearing in two games for the Spirits of St. Louis during the 1975–76 campaign.

Paul married Lael Bower in 1970 and they had 6 children. Shannon, Bryon, Kellene, Brett, Erin and Brad.

At the conclusion of his basketball career, Ruffner and his family moved to Provo, Utah making it their permanent home. He became a successful property owner and manager of student housing in Provo. He continued to share his knowledge and expertise of the game through color commentary on KSL Radio which he did for 21 years.

Ruffner died at home on June 17, 2022, from leukemia.

== Career statistics ==
Legend
GP	Games played	GS	Games started	MPG	Minutes per game
FG%	Field goal percentage	3P%	3-point field goal percentage	FT%	Free throw percentage
RPG	Rebounds per game	APG	Assists per game	SPG	Steals per game
BPG	Blocks per game	PPG	Points per game	**Bold**	Career high

=== NBA/ABA ===
==== Regular season ====
Year	Team	GP	GS	MPG	FG%	3P%	FT%	RPG	APG	SPG	BPG	PPG
1970–71	Chicago (NBA)	10	0	6.0	.429		.500	1.6	.2			3.4
1971–72	Pittsburgh (ABA)	**79**		**13.4**	.478	–	**.730**	**4.3**	**.7**			**5.7**
1973–74	Buffalo (NBA)	20		2.6	.407		.615	.6	.0	**.1**	**.1**	1.5
1974–75	Buffalo (NBA)	22		4.7	.468		.200	1.0	.3	**.1**	**.1**	2.0
1975–76	St. Louis (ABA)	2		2.5	**.667**	–	–	1.5	.0	.0	.0	2.0
Career (NBA)		52	0	4.1	.440		.500	.9	.2	.1	.1	2.1
Career (ABA)		81		13.1	.479	–	.730	4.2	.6	.0	.0	5.6
Career (overall)		133	0	9.6	.471	–	.688	3.0	.5	.1	.1	4.2

==== Playoffs ====
Year	Team	GP	MPG	FG%	FT%	RPG	APG	SPG	BPG	PPG
1971	Chicago	**1**	3.0	.000	–	**2.0**	.0			.0
1975	Buffalo	**1**	**4.0**	.000	–	**2.0**	.0	.0	.0	.0
Career		2	3.5	.000	–	2.0	.0	.0	.0	.0
