= Mario Bennett =

American basketball player (born 1973)

Personal information
- Born: August 1, 1973 (age 53) Denton, Texas, U.S.
- Listed height: 6 ft 9 in (2.06 m)
- Listed weight: 235 lb (107 kg)

Career information
- High school: Denton (Denton, Texas)
- College: Arizona State (1991–1995)
- NBA draft: 1995: 1st round, 27th overall pick
- Drafted by: Phoenix Suns
- Playing career: 1995–2011
- Position: Power forward

Career history
- 1995–1996: Phoenix Suns
- 1996–1997: Grand Rapids Hoops
- 1997: Yakima Sun Kings
- 1997–1998: Los Angeles Lakers
- 1999: Chicago Bulls
- 2000: Los Angeles Clippers
- 2000–2001: San Diego Wildfire
- 2001: Unicaja Málaga
- 2001–2002: Montpellier Basket
- 2002: San Miguel Beermen
- 2002–2003: Sioux Falls Skyforce
- 2003: Paris Basket Racing
- 2003: Avtodor Saratov
- 2003–2004: Sioux Falls Skyforce
- 2004–2005: Fastlink Amman
- 2005: Mabetex
- 2005–2007: JDA Dijon
- 2007–2008: Panteras de Aguascalientes
- 2008: Hebraica y Macabi
- 2008: Geofin Nový Jičín
- 2010–2011: CSM București

Career highlights
- 2× First-team All-Pac-10 (1994, 1995)
- Stats at NBA.com
- Stats at Basketball Reference

Mario Marcell Bennett (born August 1, 1973) is an American former professional basketball player.

== College career ==
The youngest of four children, Bennett was an early entry candidate for the 1995 NBA Draft despite having been in school for four years, because he missed the entire 1992–93 season recovering from knee surgery. Although he played only three seasons, he placed first all-time in school history in blocked shots (191) and field goal percentage (.587) and was eighth in rebounding (675). During the 1994–95 campaign he set the Pac-10 single-season mark for blocks with 115, and he became only the third player in Sun Devils history to net 600 or more points in a season. The powerful forward finished his career with 219 dunks. Bennett missed all of 1992–93 and the first six games of the 1993–94 campaign while recovering from left knee surgery to repair anterior cruciate ligament tears.

He finished his 87-game college career with per-game averages of 32.3 minutes, 15.7 points on 58.7% shooting and 53.0% free throws, 7.8 rebounds, 1.6 assists, 2.8 turnovers, 2.2 steals and 1.1 blocks.

== NBA career ==
Selected by the Phoenix Suns in the first round of the 1995 NBA Draft with the 27th overall pick, Bennett was the first Sun Devil to be drafted in 12 years since Byron Scott. Bennett was the top rebounder in preseason for Phoenix with 8.8 rpg but he underwent arthroscopic knee surgery on Nov. 1. He spent four months on the injured list before finally playing in 19 late-season games for the Suns. He was waived by the Suns on 10/29/96. He averaged 8.0 ppg and 6.3 rpg in 1996–97 in 7 games for Grand Rapids and Yakima of the CBA.

He was signed by the Los Angeles Lakers as a free agent on September 21, 1997, and played in 45 games in 1997–98, averaging 3.9 points and 2.8 rebounds per game in limited action. Prior to the 1998–99 season, Mario Bennett signed with the Chicago Bulls as a free agent on 1/31/99 and was waived by the Bulls on 2/16/99. He went on to play one game for the Los Angeles Clippers in the 1999–2000 season.

Bennett has NBA career per-game averages 4.0 points on 54.4% FG and 51.1% FT, and 2.7 rebounds on 8.9 minutes per game. He registered career highs of 21 points and 14 rebounds on separate occasions.

== Overseas career ==
He began to make a name in Europe at Montpellier in 2003. He later left for to suit up for San Miguel Beermen in the Philippine Basketball Association. He went back to France to have a superb season with Paris Basket Racing.

Afterwards, the man with a tattooed body from top to bottom (eyes in the back, Mario bros on the arm, a basketball player on the calf), turned his services east for the Russian team, Avtodor Saratov. After a few games in Russia, Bennett left his team amicably.

After a stint in the CBA again, he joined the Fastlink Aman team (Jordan). Knee problems cut his stint there and he went to seek treatment for that. After a knee operation, he came back to play with KB Mabetex Prishtina in Kosovo.

At the age of 32, he joined Dijon, whose coach Monclar knew his qualities. The stint, in which he averaged 10 points and 9 rebounds, resulted in a selection for the All Star game. A broken metatarsal halted Bennett's season in January 2007.

In early January 2011 Bennett was involved in an incident in a nightclub located in the city of Bucharest, where he claimed security guards attacked him violently, causing injuries to his head and legs.
