= Dickey Simpkins =

American basketball player (born 1972)

Personal information
- Born: April 6, 1972 (age 54) Fort Washington, Maryland, U.S.
- Listed height: 6 ft 9 in (2.06 m)
- Listed weight: 248 lb (112 kg)

Career information
- High school: Friendly (Fort Washington, Maryland)
- College: Providence (1990–1994)
- NBA draft: 1994: 1st round, 21st overall pick
- Drafted by: Chicago Bulls
- Playing career: 1994–2006
- Position: Power forward / center
- Number: 8, 0

Career history
- 1994–1997: Chicago Bulls
- 1997–1998: Golden State Warriors
- 1998–2000: Chicago Bulls
- 2000–2001: Makedonikos
- 2001: Atlanta Hawks
- 2001–2002: Rockford Lightning
- 2002: Maroussi
- 2002: Criollos de Caguas
- 2002–2003: UNICS Kazan
- 2003–2004: Lietuvos Rytas
- 2004: Leones de Ponce
- 2004–2005: Dakota Wizards
- 2005: Plus Pujol Lleida
- 2005: Alaska Aces
- 2005: Blue Stars Beirut
- 2006: GHP Bamberg

Career highlights
- 3× NBA champion (1996–1998); BSN champion (2004); Russian Cup champion (2003); CBA rebounding leader (2002)

Career NBA statistics
- Points: 1,388 (4.2 ppg)
- Rebounds: 1,187 (3.6 rpg)
- Assists: 305 (0.9 apg)
- Stats at NBA.com
- Stats at Basketball Reference

LuBara Dixon "Dickey" Simpkins (born April 6, 1972) is an American former professional basketball player best known for his tenure with the Chicago Bulls in the late 1990s. He is currently a commentator for Fox Sports.

== Early life ==
Simpkins was born on April 6, 1972, in Fort Washington, Maryland. As a 6' 9" forward/center, Simpkins starred at Friendly High School in Maryland.

== College career ==
Simpkins would go on to play college basketball at Providence College. He would play four seasons for the Providence Friars basketball team, averaging 9.8 points per game during his collegiate career. During his time at Providence, Simpkins was twice named to the Big East All-Tournament team in 1993 and 1994. In 1994, he helped the Friars win the conference title and earn a spot in the 1994 NCAA tournament. In 2013, Providence inducted Simpkins into the college's athletic Hall of Fame.

== Professional career ==
Simpkins was selected by the Chicago Bulls with the 21st pick in the 1994 NBA draft. Behind Luc Longley, Bill Wennington, and later Dennis Rodman in the Bulls' playing rotation, he saw limited action in his first few seasons as a Bull, scoring 513 points in 167 games. He earned two NBA Championship rings in 1996 and 1997, but was not on the team's active roster for either playoff run, and in fall 1997 the Bulls traded him to the Golden State Warriors for guard/forward Scott Burrell.

The Warriors subsequently waived Simpkins, and the Bulls claimed him. Simpkins posted a .634 field goal percentage in 21 games, and in the spring of 1998 he participated in the playoffs for the first time of his career, earning his third championship ring. After the 1998–99 NBA lockout, the Bulls parted ways with Michael Jordan, Scottie Pippen, Rodman and Luc Longley, which provided Simpkins with significantly more playing time. During the 1999 season he emerged as a part-time starter, averaging career highs of 9.1 points and 6.8 rebounds, and in the following season, he played a career-high 1,651 minutes.

After the Bulls signed Brad Miller in September 2000, the Bulls renounced their rights to Simpkins, who would spend a season in Greece before joining the Atlanta Hawks during the 2001–02 NBA season. He only played one game for the Hawks, though, and spent the rest of the season in Greece and the CBA. He later played in Russia, Puerto Rico, Lithuania, Spain, Philippines, Lebanon, and Germany. In 2005, Simpkins joined the Alaska Aces (PBA) of the Philippine Basketball Association as replacement for Leon Derricks. He led the team to a three-game quarterfinals loss against the sixth-seeded Red Bull franchise.

== Post-playing career ==
Simpkins has worked as a college basketball analyst for ESPN. He is the founder of the basketball development company Next Level Performance Inc. (NLP), and is a national motivational speaker. He is currently a color commentator at Fox Sports 1 (FS1) for the Big East games.

He was a scout for the Charlotte Hornets and the Washington Wizards.

== NBA career statistics ==
Legend
GP	Games played	GS	Games started	MPG	Minutes per game
FG%	Field goal percentage	3P%	3-point field goal percentage	FT%	Free throw percentage
RPG	Rebounds per game	APG	Assists per game	SPG	Steals per game
BPG	Blocks per game	PPG	Points per game	**Bold**	Career high
†	Won an NBA championship	*	Led the league

=== Regular season ===
Year	Team	GP	GS	MPG	FG%	3P%	FT%	RPG	APG	SPG	BPG	PPG
1994–95	Chicago	59	5	9.9	.424	–	.694	2.6	0.6	0.2	0.1	3.5
1995–96†	Chicago	60	12	11.4	.481	**1.000**	.629	2.6	0.6	0.2	0.1	3.6
1996–97†	Chicago	48	0	8.2	.333	.250	**.700**	1.9	0.6	0.1	0.1	1.9
1997–98	Golden State	19	0	10.3	.458	.000	.385	2.4	0.8	0.3	0.1	2.8
1997–98†	Chicago	21	0	11.3	**.634**	.000	.591	1.5	0.8	0.2	0.1	3.7
1998–99	Chicago	50*	35	**29.0**	.463	.000	.645	**6.8**	1.3	**0.7**	**0.3**	**9.1**
1999–00	Chicago	**69**	**48**	23.9	.405	.000	.542	5.4	**1.4**	0.3	**0.3**	4.2
2001–02	Atlanta	1	0	3.0	–	–	–	0.0	1.0	0.0	0.0	0.0
Career		327	100	15.9	.440	.222	.618	3.6	0.9	0.3	0.2	4.2

=== Playoffs ===
Year	Team	GP	GS	MPG	FG%	3P%	FT%	RPG	APG	SPG	BPG	PPG
1998	Chicago	13	0	5.7	.375	–	.444	1.0	0.2	0.2	0.1	1.2
Career		13	0	5.7	.375	–	.444	1.0	0.2	0.2	0.1	1.2
