= Johnny Baum =

American basketball player (born 1946)

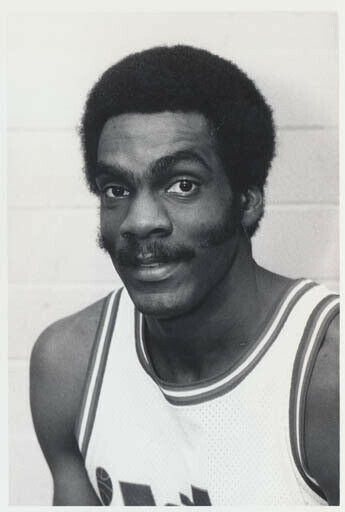
- Baum with the Allentown Jets in 1977

Personal information
- Born: June 17, 1946 (age 80) Philadelphia, Pennsylvania, U.S.
- Listed height: 6 ft 5 in (1.96 m)
- Listed weight: 200 lb (91 kg)

Career information
- High school: West Philadelphia (Philadelphia, Pennsylvania)
- College: Peirce (1964–1965); Temple (1966–1969)
- NBA draft: 1969: 2nd round, 23rd overall pick
- Drafted by: Chicago Bulls
- Playing career: 1969–1978
- Position: Small forward
- Number: 9, 14, 20, 15, 22

Career history
- 1969–1971: Chicago Bulls
- 1971–1973: New York Nets
- 1973–1974: Memphis Tams
- 1974: Indiana Pacers
- 1974–1976: Hazleton Bullets
- 1976–1977: Syracuse Centennials
- 1977–1978: Allentown Jets

Career highlights
- All-EBA First Team (1976)

Career NBA and ABA statistics
- Points: 1,498 (6.1 ppg)
- Rebounds: 666 (2.7 rpg)
- Assists: 141 (0.6 apg)
- Stats at NBA.com
- Stats at Basketball Reference

John "Jumpin' Johnny" Baum (born June 17, 1946) is an American former basketball player. Born in Philadelphia, he played collegiately for Temple University.

A 6 ft 5 in (1.96 m) and 200 lb (91 kg) forward, he was selected by the Los Angeles Lakers in the 15th round (187th pick overall) of the 1968 NBA draft and by the Chicago Bulls in the second round (23rd pick overall) of the 1969 NBA draft.

He played for the Chicago Bulls (1969–71) in the NBA and for the New York Nets (1971–73), Memphis Tams and Indiana Pacers (1973–74) in the American Basketball Association (ABA) for 244 games.

Baum played in the Eastern Basketball Association (EBA) for the Hazleton Bullets, Syracuse Centennials and Allentown Jets from 1974 to 1978. He was selected to the All-EBA First Team in 1976.

== Career statistics ==
Legend
GP	Games played	GS	Games started	MPG	Minutes per game
FG%	Field goal percentage	3P%	3-point field goal percentage	FT%	Free throw percentage
RPG	Rebounds per game	APG	Assists per game	SPG	Steals per game
BPG	Blocks per game	PPG	Points per game	**Bold**	Career high

=== NBA/ABA ===
==== Regular season ====
Year	Team	GP	GS	MPG	FG%	3P%	FT%	RPG	APG	SPG	BPG	PPG
1969–70	Chicago	3		4.3	.273		–	1.3	.0			2.0
1970–71	Chicago	62	0	8.8	.420		.690	2.0	.5			4.6
1971–72	N.Y. Nets (ABA)	44		12.5	**.606**	–	.788	3.1	.4			5.6
1972–73	N.Y. Nets (ABA)	**75**		14.3	.505	.000	.748	2.7	.4			7.3
1973–74	Memphis (ABA)	47		**23.5**	.448	–	**.842**	**3.7**	**1.3**	**.6**	**.3**	**8.0**
1973–74	Indiana (ABA)	13		8.7	.472	–	.500	1.9	.2	.5	.2	2.8
Career (NBA)		65	0	8.6	.414		.690	2.0	.5			4.5
Career (ABA)		179		15.9	.500	.000	.773	3.0	.6	.6	.3	6.7
Career (overall)		244	0	13.9	.480	.000	.758	2.7	.6	.6	.3	6.1

==== Playoffs ====
Year	Team	GP	MPG	FG%	3P%	FT%	RPG	APG	SPG	BPG	PPG
1971	Chicago	2	2.5	–		–	.5	.0			.0
1972	N.Y. Nets (ABA)	**17**	17.8	**.551**	–	.625	**4.2**	.4			7.5
1973	N.Y. Nets (ABA)	5	**38.2**	.526	–	.706	**4.2**	**.8**			**18.8**
1974	Indiana (ABA)	11	9.7	.531	–	**1.000**	1.8	.2	.5	.1	3.6
Career (ABA)		33	18.2	.539	–	.718	3.4	.4	.5	.1	7.9
Career (overall)		35	17.3	.539	–	.718	3.3	.4	.5	.1	7.5
