= 1975–76 Kentucky Colonels season =

ABA basketball team season

- Head coach: Hubie Brown
- Arena: Freedom Hall

Results
- Record: 46–38 (.548)
- Place: Division: 2nd Conference: 4th
- Playoff finish: ABA Semifinals (lost to the Nuggets 3–4)

Local media
- Television: WHAS 11
- Radio: WHAS

The 1975–76 Kentucky Colonels season was the ninth and final season for what were to be the defending champions of the American Basketball Association (ABA). Before this season was about to begin for Kentucky, the Colonels noticed that two of the ABA's strongest teams outside of themselves, the Denver Nuggets and New York Nets, wanted to have the Colonels join them in their pursuit to leave the ABA instead and join the NBA early; despite the risks involved with staying put, team owner John Y. Brown Jr. decided to stay put with the ABA out of what was perceived to be as loyalty to the league, with the Nuggets and Nets' plans to leave the ABA early being foiled by the ruling of the judge that was preceding over their case claiming that even two ABA teams joining the NBA like they had intended to do would still technically count as a merger between leagues. Due to the team letting go of longtime star player Dan Issel for cost-saving measures before the season began, this season saw the defending champion Kentucky Colonels finish in fourth place in the ABA, which was good enough to see them be the last team with a winning record to make it to the 1976 ABA Playoffs, but not quite good enough to avoid a trip to the quarterfinals first. Luckily for them, the Colonels would defeat the Indiana Pacers 2 games to 1 in what ultimately became the final playoff match of two longtime rivals in the ABA during the first round of the 1976 ABA Playoffs. However, despite their best efforts possible, the Colonels would end up losing to the regular season champion Denver Nuggets 4 games to 3 in the ABA Semifinals in what officially became the Colonels' final games ever played in franchise history. Despite being considered one of the strongest teams in the ABA and being thought of as a shoo-in for entry into the National Basketball Association (NBA), especially since they were one of two teams alongside the Indiana Pacers to remain where they were at and stick with the team name they had throughout the ABA's entire existence alongside play in every ABA Playoff event by this point in time, the 1975–76 season would prove to be the Colonels' last as a team, as Kentucky joined the Spirits of St. Louis as one of the two ABA teams to survive the entire season (as well as became the only playoff team from that season) to be left out of the 1976 ABA-NBA merger due to the NBA wanting only four of the ABA's strongest teams to join their league instead of five or even all six of the remaining teams left in the ABA by this time (despite the Virginia Squires surviving the regular season, they were forced to fold operations a month before the merger commenced due to the Squires failing to make a $75,000 league assessment payment alongside $120,000 in back pay for their players) and the Chicago Bulls desperately wanting to add center Artis Gilmore onto their roster, among other viable reasons that the Bulls saw them keeping the Colonels out of the NBA.

== Offseason ==
=== ABA Draft ===
Round	Pick	Player	Position(s)	Nationality	College
1	11	Jimmie Baker	PF	United States	Hawaii
3	22	Allen Murphy	SG	United States	Kentucky
3	31	Eric Fernsten	PF/C	United States	San Francisco
4	41	John Laskowski	SG	United States	Indiana
5	51	Charles Cleveland	SG	United States	Alabama
6	61	Mike Rozenski	F	United States	Saint Mary's College of California
7	71	Randy Meister	C	United States	Penn State
8	81	Lou Silver	SF/PF	United States; Israel	Harvard

The selection of Lou Silver can be considered the last pick ever made in ABA draft history.

=== Preseason transactions ===
Prior to the season, ABA Commissioner Dave DeBusschere, urged on by Colonels owner John Y. Brown, Jr., challenged the NBA to a world championship series between the ABA champion Kentucky Colonels and NBA champion Golden State Warriors in which the winner would get $1 million. NBA Commissioner Walter Kennedy promptly declined.

Star center Dan Issel was sold to the Baltimore Claws for $500,000, and soon ended up with the Denver Nuggets.

Gene Rhodes was named vice president of operations and David Vance was named general manager.

=== Preseason exhibition games ===
Like most ABA teams, the Colonels played several preseason exhibition games against NBA opponents. The Colonels opened up the season's ABA vs. NBA action on October 1, 1975, in Cincinnati, Ohio, against the NBA's Chicago Bulls. The Colonels beat the Bulls 95–86.

Three nights later on October 4, 1975, the Colonels met the NBA's New York Knicks at the Capital Centre in Landover, Maryland. Louie Dampier scored 23 for the Colonels but New York's Earl Monroe led all scorers with 26 as the Knicks won 107–102.

The next night the Colonels returned to Cincinnati to host the Detroit Pistons. Bob Lanier led the Pistons with 17 points but Artis Gilmore had 22 and Travis Grant added 17 and the game winning score, a jump shot with 4 seconds left in game, to lead Kentucky to a 114–113 victory.

On October 8, 1975, the reigning champions of the ABA and NBA met at Freedom Hall in Louisville. 8,806 fans turned out to see the Golden State Warriors face the Colonels. Marv Roberts scored 20 points and former ABA player Rick Barry was held to 9 points on 3 of 11 shooting from the floor, including an airball with 31 seconds left in the game. Artis Gilmore had 14 points and 11 rebounds to lead the Colonels to a 93–90 victory against the NBA champions.

Two nights later on October 10, 1975, the NBA's Milwaukee Bucks visited Louisville and lost to the Colonels 96–91.

On October 12, 1975, the Kentucky Colonels traveled to Michigan to face the Detroit Pistons again. The game went to overtime. Despite Bird Averitt's 21 points the Pistons won the overtime game, 115–107.

Two nights later on October 14, 1975, the NBA's Buffalo Braves came to Louisville and were defeated by the Colonels, 120–116.

On October 17, 1975, the Philadelphia 76ers traveled to Cincinnati to face the Colonels. Former ABA player George McGinnis had 25 points but so did Artis Gilmore. Kentucky won, 112–110.

Two nights later on October 19, 1975, the Colonels hosted the Washington Bullets in Lexington, Kentucky. Led by Artis Gilmore's 23 points, the Colonels won 121–111. This was the penultimate ABA-NBA matchup; two nights later in Salt Lake City, Utah, the Milwaukee Bucks lost to the Utah Stars 106–101.

Overall in the 1975-76 preseason the ABA went 30–18 against NBA teams.

=== Roster ===
1975–76 Kentucky Colonels roster
Players

Pos.	No.	Player	Height	Weight	DOB	From
SG	14	Bird Averitt	6 ft 1 in (1.85 m)	170 lb (77 kg)	July 22, 1952	Pepperdine
PF	32	Jimmie Baker	6 ft 9 in (2.06 m)	220 lb (100 kg)	December 25, 1953	Hawaiʻi
SG	21	Jimmy Dan Conner	6 ft 4 in (1.93 m)	190 lb (86 kg)	March 20, 1953	Kentucky
PG	10	Louie Dampier	6 ft 0 in (1.83 m)	170 lb (77 kg)	November 20, 1944	Kentucky
C	53	Artis Gilmore	7 ft 2 in (2.18 m)	240 lb (109 kg)	September 21, 1949	Jacksonville
SF	5	Travis Grant	6 ft 7 in (2.01 m)	215 lb (98 kg)	January 1, 1950	Kentucky State
C	3	Caldwell Jones	6 ft 11 in (2.11 m)	217 lb (98 kg)	August 4, 1950	Albany State
SF	22	Wil Jones	6 ft 8 in (2.03 m)	205 lb (93 kg)	February 27, 1947	Albany State
SG	43	Kevin Joyce	6 ft 3 in (1.91 m)	190 lb (86 kg)	June 27, 1951	South Carolina
PF	25	Maurice Lucas	6 ft 9 in (2.06 m)	215 lb (98 kg)	February 18, 1952	Marquette
SG	24	Ted McClain	6 ft 1 in (1.85 m)	180 lb (82 kg)	August 30, 1946	Tennessee State
C	45	Jim McDaniels	6 ft 11 in (2.11 m)	228 lb (103 kg)	April 2, 1948	Western Kentucky
SG	20	Allen Murphy	6 ft 5 in (1.96 m)	190 lb (86 kg)	July 15, 1952	Louisville
SG	31	Johnny Neumann	6 ft 6 in (1.98 m)	200 lb (91 kg)	September 11, 1951	Mississippi
C	25	Tom Owens	6 ft 10 in (2.08 m)	215 lb (98 kg)	June 28, 1949	South Carolina
SF	31	Marv Roberts	6 ft 8 in (2.03 m)	200 lb (91 kg)	January 29, 1950	Utah State
PF	42	Ron Thomas	6 ft 6 in (1.98 m)	215 lb (98 kg)	November 19, 1950	Louisville
SF	5	Jan van Breda Kolff	6 ft 7 in (2.01 m)	195 lb (88 kg)	December 16, 1951	Vanderbilt

Coaches
Head coach

Hubie Brown

Legend
- (DP) Unsigned draft pick
- (FA) Free agent
- (S) Suspended
- Injured

Roster

== Regular season ==
=== Season standings ===
Team	W	L	PCT.	GB
Denver Nuggets *	60	24	.714	—
**New York Nets** *	55	29	.655	5
San Antonio Spurs *	50	34	.595	10
Kentucky Colonels *	46	38	.548	14
Indiana Pacers *	39	45	.464	21
Spirits of St. Louis	35	49	.417	25
Virginia Squires †	15	68	.181	44
San Diego Sails †	3	8	.273	—
Utah Stars †	4	12	.250	—
Baltimore Claws †	0	0	.000	—

Asterisk (*) denotes playoff team
† did not survive the end of the season.
Bold – ABA champions

=== Game log ===
1975–76 game log
November

Game	Date	Team	Score	High points	Location Attendance	Record

December

Game	Date	Team	Score	High points	Location Attendance	Record

January

Game	Date	Team	Score	High points	Location Attendance	Record

February

Game	Date	Team	Score	High points	Location Attendance	Record

March

Game	Date	Team	Score	High points	Location Attendance	Record

April

Game	Date	Team	Score	High points	Location Attendance	Record

1975–76 season schedule

== ABA Playoffs ==
ABA Quarterfinals

Game	Date	Opponent	Score	Attendance	Record
1	April 8	Indiana	W 120–109	3,288	1–0
2	April 10	@ Indiana	L 95–109	5,850	1–1
3	April 12	Indiana	W 100–99	5,267	2–1

Colonels win series, 2–1

ABA Semifinals

Game	Date	Opponent	Score	Attendance	Record
1	April 15	@ Denver	L 107–110	15,234	0–1
2	April 17	@ Denver	W 138–119	16,384	1–1
3	April 19	Denver	W 126–114	9,644	2–1
4	April 21	Denver	L 106–108	11,444	2–2
5	April 22	@ Denver	L 117–127	17,068	2–3
6	April 25	Denver	W 119–115 (OT)	6,312	3–3
7	April 28	@ Denver	L 110–133	18,821	4–3

Colonels lose series, 4–3

The Colonels would end up becoming the only ABA team to play in the 1976 ABA Playoffs to not make it to the NBA following the ABA-NBA merger.

== Player statistics ==
=== Legend ===
- GP: Games played
- GS: Games started
- MPG: Minutes per game
- FG%: Field goal percentage
- 3FG%: 3-point field goal percentage
- FT%: Free throw percentage
- RPG: Rebounds per game
- APG: Assists per game
- SPG: Steals per game
- BPG: Blocks per game
- PPG: Points per game

=== Season ===
Player	GP	GS	MPG	FG%	3FG%	FT%	RPG	APG	SPG	BPG	PPG

== Awards and records ==
=== Awards ===
- Artis Gilmore, 1976 ABA All-Star Game
- Artis Gilmore, All-ABA First Team
- Artis Gilmore, ABA All-Defensive Team

=== Records ===
On December 18, 1975, the Colonels had their smallest crowd ever, 2,761, for a 115–102 loss to the San Antonio Spurs.

On April 28, 1976, the Colonels were the opponent, in the ABA Semifinals, when the Denver Nuggets set their franchise's attendance record, with 18,821 present for the Nuggets' 133–110 win in Game 7.

== Transactions ==
- Dan Issel sold to Baltimore Claws for $500,000, preseason
- Caldwell Jones purchased from the San Diego Sails, November 14, 1975
- Caldwell Jones traded to the Spirits of St. Louis for Maurice Lucas, December 17, 1975
- Marv Roberts traded to the Virginia Squires for Johnny Neumann and Jan van Breda Kolff, January 17, 1976
- Ted McClain sold to the New York Nets for $150,000, February 15, 1976

== Aftermath ==
With the conclusion of the 1975–76 ABA season, negotiations to finalize the ABA-NBA merger began. On June 17, 1976, Colonels owner John Y. Brown Jr. agreed to fold the Colonels in exchange for $3 million from the ABA teams entering the NBA. The Colonels' players were put into a dispersal draft along with the players from the Spirits of St. Louis. The Chicago Bulls took Artis Gilmore for $1.1 million; the Portland Trail Blazers took Maurice Lucas for $300,000; the Buffalo Braves took Bird Averitt for $125,000; the Indiana Pacers took Wil Jones for $50,000; the New York Nets took Jan Van Breda Kolff for $60,000 and the San Antonio Spurs took Louie Dampier for $20,000. Brown took the money he received for the Colonels and used part of it to purchase the NBA's Buffalo Braves, which he later parlayed into ownership of the Boston Celtics.
