= 1974–75 Kentucky Colonels season =

- ABA champions
- Division champions
- Head coach: Hubie Brown
- Arena: Freedom Hall

Results
- Record: 58–26 (.690)
- Place: Division: 1st (Eastern); Conference: 1st
- Playoff finish: ABA Champions (Defeated Pacers 4–1)

Local media
- Television: WLKY 32
- Radio: WHAS

The 1974–75 Kentucky Colonels season was the eighth and penultimate season in franchise history. After repeated failures with the team trying to win the ABA Finals championship throughout the last seven seasons, the Colonels under John Y. Brown Jr.'s ownership looked to replace last season's head coach, Babe McCarthy, with Milwaukee Bucks assistant coach Hubie Brown believing he was ready to coach a professional basketball team like the Colonels in the ABA. Under Hubie Brown's leadership as a head coach combined with the homegrown team chemistry that was led by previous draft picks of theirs in Dan Issel, Artis Gilmore, and Louie Dampier, the Colonels would finish the season winning 22 of their last 25 games of the regular season, including the final 10 games of the season, the last of which became a key match-up against the New York Nets, which saw them improbably tie the Eastern Division up with the Nets to end the regular season. They would later play in a one-game playoff to determine who would win the #1 seed despite Kentucky already winning more games against the Nets this season (beating them 6 games to 5), which Kentucky won easily due to Artis Gilmore's rebounding ability being so strong that night that he alone overpowered the entire Nets team that game with a double-double of 28 points and 33 rebounds (having three more rebounds than the entire Nets team that game) for a 108–99 win to secure the #1 seed. Once that was done with, the Colonels would make easy work with both the Memphis Sounds and Spirits of St. Louis (both teams being playoff contenders this season despite them having losing records due to the talent dispersity in the Eastern Division) before resting up real well for the 1975 ABA Championship series against their nearby stateside rivals, the Indiana Pacers. Once they began playing for the championship, the Colonels finally managed to get the upper hand over their longtime rivals, winning the championship series 4–1 to finally proclaim themselves as ABA champions after eight years of waiting. Notably, the Colonels attempted to get a "World Series" championship game of sorts to occur with the champions of the 1975 NBA Finals, the Golden State Warriors, with the winning team receiving $1,000,000 and the game being projected to have been aired on CBS after the season ended, but the Warriors and NBA declined them that opportunity.

== Offseason ==
=== ABA Draft ===
Round	Pick	Player	Position(s)	Nationality	College
2	18	Al Eberhard	SF	United States	Missouri
3	28	Sammy High	F	United States	Tulsa
4	39	Lloyd Batts	SG/SF	United States	Cincinnati
5	49	Seymour Reed	F	United States	Bradley
6	59	Bill Ligon	SG	United States	Vanderbilt
7	69	Bill Butler	G	United States	Louisville
8	79	Leonard Coulter	F	United States	Morehead State
9	89	Lionel Hollins	PG	United States	Arizona State
10	99	Steve Walker	G	United States	Kentucky Wesleyan

This draft table does not include the "ABA Draft of NBA Players" that was done immediately afterward.

=== ABA Draft of NBA Players ===
Round	Pick	Player	Position(s)	Nationality	College	NBA Team
1	9	Jim Price	PG	United States	Louisville	Los Angeles Lakers
2	19	Greg Smith	SF/PF	United States	Western Kentucky	Portland Trail Blazers
3	29	Rowland Garrett	SF	United States	Florida State	Chicago Bulls
4	39	Herm Gilliam	PG/SG	United States	Purdue	Atlanta Hawks
5	49	Larry Steele	G	United States	Kentucky	Portland Trail Blazers

The "ABA Draft of NBA Players" that was done on April 17, 1974, happened immediately after the actual ABA Draft done for this season was concluded on that day. None of the five players drafted by the Colonels would report to the team this season, though Jim Price would later play for the Denver Nuggets following the ABA-NBA merger that would later occur in 1976. Interestingly, the Colonels would join the San Antonio Spurs as the only two ABA teams that year to not draft any NBA players that would later go on to become members of the Naismith Basketball Hall of Fame.

=== Preseason transactions ===
Following the 1973–74 Kentucky Colonels season, the Colonels fired head coach Babe McCarthy despite his winning the 1974 ABA Coach of the Year award. Milwaukee Bucks assistant coach Hubie Brown was hired as McCarthy's replacement in June 1974.

=== Preseason exhibition games ===
Like most ABA teams, the Colonels played several preseason exhibition games against NBA opponents. By September 29, 1974, the ABA had won all five of that season's ABA vs. NBA exhibition games as the Colonels took the floor in Lincoln, Nebraska, against the Kansas City–Omaha Kings. Dan Issel scored 26 for the Colonels but the Kings won, 102–91. On October 1 the NBA's Washington Bullets visited the Colonels' home court at Freedom Hall. Artis Gilmore had 26 points and 16 rebounds as the Colonels won, 118–95. On October 5, 1974, the Colonels traveled to Pasadena, Texas, to face the Houston Rockets. The Rockets won 96–95 despite Gilmore's 22 points. On October 8, 1974, in Louisville the Colonels hosted the Detroit Pistons, defeating the NBA team 109–100 behind Gilmore's 18 points and 11 rebounds. On October 12 the Colonels defeated the Chicago Bulls in Louisville, 93–75. Gilmore scored 24 points and Dan Issel scored 15.

The ABA went 16-7 vs. the NBA in that season's exhibition games; the Colonels posted a 3–2 record.

== Roster ==
1974–75 Kentucky Colonels roster
Players

Pos.	No.	Player	Height	Weight	DOB	From
SG	14	Bird Averitt	6 ft 1 in (1.85 m)	170 lb (77 kg)	July 22, 1952	Pepperdine
PF	25	Jim Bradley	6 ft 8 in (2.03 m)	215 lb (98 kg)	March 16, 1952	Northern Illinois
PG	10	Louie Dampier	6 ft 0 in (1.83 m)	170 lb (77 kg)	November 20, 1944	Kentucky
C	53	Artis Gilmore	7 ft 2 in (2.18 m)	240 lb (109 kg)	September 21, 1949	Jacksonville
PG	12	Joe Hamilton	5 ft 10 in (1.78 m)	160 lb (73 kg)	July 5, 1948	North Texas
PF	44	Dan Issel	6 ft 9 in (2.06 m)	235 lb (107 kg)	October 25, 1948	Kentucky
SF	22	Wil Jones	6 ft 8 in (2.03 m)	205 lb (93 kg)	February 27, 1947	Albany State
PG	23	Gene Littles	6 ft 0 in (1.83 m)	160 lb (73 kg)	June 29, 1943	High Point
SG	24	Ted McClain	6 ft 1 in (1.85 m)	180 lb (82 kg)	August 30, 1946	Tennessee State
C		Red Robbins	6 ft 8 in (2.03 m)	190 lb (86 kg)	September 30, 1944	Tennessee
SF	31	Marv Roberts	6 ft 8 in (2.03 m)	200 lb (91 kg)	January 29, 1950	Utah State
SG	11	John Roche	6 ft 3 in (1.91 m)	170 lb (77 kg)	September 26, 1949	South Carolina
PF	42	Ron Thomas	6 ft 6 in (1.98 m)	215 lb (98 kg)	November 19, 1950	Louisville

Coaches
Head coach

Hubie Brown

Legend
- (DP) Unsigned draft pick
- (FA) Free agent
- (S) Suspended
- Injured

Roster

== Regular season ==
=== Season standings ===
1974–75 ABA Final Standings
Eastern Division	W	L	PCT.	GB
Kentucky Colonels	58	26	.690	-
New York Nets	58	26	.690	-
Spirits of St. Louis	32	52	.381	26
Memphis Sounds	27	57	.321	31
Virginia Squires	15	69	.179	43
Western Division	W	L	PCT.	GB
Denver Nuggets	65	19	.774	-
San Antonio Spurs	51	33	.607	14
Indiana Pacers	45	39	.536	20
Utah Stars	38	46	.452	27
San Diego Conquistadors	31	53	.369	34

=== Game log ===
1974–75 game log
November

Game	Date	Team	Score	High points	Location Attendance	Record

December

Game	Date	Team	Score	High points	Location Attendance	Record

January

Game	Date	Team	Score	High points	Location Attendance	Record

February

Game	Date	Team	Score	High points	Location Attendance	Record

March

Game	Date	Team	Score	High points	Location Attendance	Record

April

Game	Date	Team	Score	High points	Location Attendance	Record

1974–75 season schedule

=== Month by Month ===
==== October 1974 ====
The ABA opened its regular season on October 18, 1974, and on that night the host Colonels defeated the Denver Nuggets 117–99. Two nights later the Colonels won at home before 7,207 fans against the Indiana Pacers, 101–92. On October 23 the Colonels hosted the Virginia Squires and 5,978 fans watched ten different Colonels score ten or more points as Kentucky won 136–82. The next evening the Colonels hosted the San Antonio Spurs before 10,853 fans and won 113-103 despite George Gervin's 30 points. The next evening, October 25, saw the Colonels' first loss of the season, 91–86 against the Spirits of St. Louis as Marvin Barnes scored 25 points against the Colonels with 4,217 in attendance. The next evening in Indianapolis Dan Issel had 28 points as the Colonels defeated the Indiana Pacers 107–95 in front of 10,948 fans. October 30 saw the Colonels win at home against the San Diego Conquistadors 97–84 as 9,622 fans saw Caldwell Jones score 22 for San Diego. The Colonels ended October with a record of 6 wins and 1 loss.

==== November 1974 ====
On November 1 the Colonels defeated the Virginia Squires 125–93 in front of 8,203 fans as Louie Dampier led all scorers with 24. Two nights later in Louisville Kentucky defeated the Memphis Sounds 104–99; Rick Mount had a game-high 27 before 7,843 spectators. On November 6 the Colonels hosted the Utah Stars in Lexington; 9,400 turned out to see Kentucky prevail 97–85 despite Ron Boone's 29 points. November 9 saw the Colonels at home against the New York Nets; 16,029 packed Freedom Hall and Julius Erving had a game-high 28 points but Kentucky won 103–97.

On November 13 the Colonels returned to Lexington, again facing the New York Nets. Julius Erving had 44 points and the game went into two overtimes before 9,577 fans; Kentucky won 132–129. Kentucky's seven game win streak came to an end on November 14 in an overtime road game as Bird Averitt's 26 were not enough to stop the San Antonio Spurs, who won 102–100 before 8,354 fans. On November 17 the Colonels bounced back with a 116–103 win against the Indiana Pacers in Lexington; Artis Gilmore scored 32 points and 7,381 attended.

November 22 saw the Colonels on the road in San Diego, losing 121–103 to the Conquistadors as Travis Grant scored 34. The next evening the Colonels lost another road game, a one-point overtime loss to the Utah Stars. Despite Bird Averitt's 31 points the Stars pulled out the overtime win 111–110 before 8,476 fans. On November 26 the Colonels returned home and defeated the Memphis Sounds 128–106 before 7,805 fans; Stew Johnson had 24 points. November 28 saw the Colonels notch a road win against the Virginia Squires, prevailing 108–95 in Hampton Roads despite George Irvine's 27 points. The next night Kentucky lost a road game to the New York Nets; 10,562 saw Julius Erving put in 33 points in a 107–98 Nets victory. Kentucky ended the month with an unusual home game in Bowling Green, Kentucky. 7,611 turned out to see the Colonels defeat the San Diego Conquistadors 109–100. San Diego's Travis Grant and Bo Lamar led all scorers with 26 points each, and Kentucky only shot 9 free throws for the night (making 6 of them) but Artis Gilmore's 20 rebounds helped power Kentucky to the win.

The Colonels went 9–4 in November for a season record of 15–5 (.750) at the start of December.

==== December 1974 ====
On December 4 the Colonels lost on the road to the Spirits of St. Louis, 126–122; Maurice Lucas scored 30 before 2,898 fans. December 7 saw the Colonels at home winning a rematch against the Spirits 119–107; 9,830 saw St. Louis' Marvin Barnes lead all scorers with 31. On December 11 the Colonels lost on the road to the Memphis Sounds 104–97. On December 13 Kentucky lost on the Indiana Pacers' home court 114–108; 8,743 saw George McGinnis score 40 for Indiana. On December 14 10,417 turned out in Louisville to see Julius Erving score 27 in leading the New York Nets to a 98–89 win over Kentucky. The Colonels finally broke their three-game losing streak on December 17 as an unusually small Freedom Hall crowd of 3,630 turned out to see Artis Gilmore's 35 points lead Kentucky to a 121–98 win over the San Antonio Spurs. The next night Kentucky ended its three-game road losing streak with a win against the Spirits of St. Louis; Artis Gilmore scored 36 as the Colonels prevailed 110–94. The next night Gilmore's 23 led homestanding Kentucky to a 125–107 win against the Denver Nuggets in front of 6,576 fans.

December 21 saw the Colonels win before 5,807 fans at home against the Memphis Sounds, 115–98; Caldwell Jones had 26 points. The next night Kentucky won another home game, this time against the Indiana Pacers 118–110 despite George McGinnis' 35 points in front of 7,606 fans. On December 26 the Colonels faced the Pacers again, and this time Kentucky lost on the road 122–111 as Billy Keller had 33 points before 10,064 fans. The Colonels returned to Louisville on December 29 and defeated the Memphis Sounds 125–114 before 8,711 fans despite Tom Owens' 37 points. The next night the Colonels closed out the month and the calendar year by winning on the road, defeating the Virginia Squires 104–85 behind Artis Gilmore's 26 points.

Kentucky went 8–5 in December to bring their record for the season to 23–10. They moved into 1975 without Red Robbins, who had been sold to the Virginia Squires.

==== January 1975 ====
The Colonels opened 1975 on January 3 with a home win against the Virginia Squires, 113–79, before 7,945 fans. The next night at home Kentucky defeated the San Antonio Spurs 123–111; 10,268 fans saw Dan Issel lead all scorers with 36. The next night the Colonels lost on the road to the Spirits of St. Louis 109–106. January 8 saw the Colonels, paced by Artis Gilmore's 26, win before 14,203 fans at home against the Virginia Squires 113–96. The next night, the Colonels won on the road against the Spirits of St. Louis, 123–116. St. Louis' Marvin Barnes led all scorers with 29, but Kentucky's Artis Gilmore had 28 points, 20 rebounds and 8 blocked shots.

On January 11 the Colonels won on the road against the Utah Stars 95–89; Artis Gilmore and Ron Boone each scored 28. On January 14 the Colonels lost a road game to the Denver Nuggets 118–99. The next night in Norfolk the Colonels defeated the Virginia Squires 108–102. On January 15 the Colonels sold John Roche to the Utah Stars. On January 17 Kentucky lost a road game to the New York Nets 108–93; Julius Erving scored 40 points before 12,133 fans. January 19 saw Kentucky win at home against the Denver Nuggets 114–101; Artis Gilmore led all scorers with 34 points in front of 7,712 fans. On January 22 the Colonels won before a home crowd of 7,971; Artis Gilmore led the way with 23 as Kentucky beat the Memphis Sounds 114–91.

On January 23 Kentucky won at home against the San Diego Conquistadors 113–109; 6,383 fans saw Caldwell Jones lead all scorers with 39. The next night the Colonels lost on the road to the New York Nets 112–110 as Julius Erving scored 42 points before 12,329 fans. On January 26 the Colonels won their next road game, against the Memphis Sounds, 108–104 in overtime.

On January 28 Louie Dampier, Dan Issel and Artis Gilmore represented Kentucky in the ABA All-Star Game in San Antonio. Their East team defeated the West 151–124. Kentucky closed out the month on January 31 with a 134–104 home win against the Spirits of St. Louis; 9,884 fans saw Artis Gilmore lead all scorers with 37 points as he went 15 of 17 from the floor and 7 of 7 from the free throw line.

The Colonels went 11–4 in January to bring their record for the season to 34-14 (.708).

==== February 1975 ====
On February 2 Kentucky won before a home crowd of 8,374, defeating the Utah Stars 96–86. On February 5 Kentucky won at home 118–97 against the Spirits of St. Louis; Artis Gilmore put in 26 points before 8,122 fans. February 7 saw the Colonels win a close one on the road against the San Diego Conquistadors, 115–114; Louie Dampier led all scorers with 26 before a typically small San Diego crowd of 2,836. The next night in Salt Lake City Kentucky defeated the Utah Stars 90–87; attendance was 12,441. The following night at home Kentucky defeated the Stars 112–95; 7,988 saw Dan Issel lead all scorers with 30. On February 12 the Colonels won on the road, defeating the San Antonio Spurs 112–100 as George Gervin led all scorers with 31 before 7,739 fans. With Kentucky's next road game their six-game win streak came to an end with a loss on February 15 as the Denver Nuggets won 109–107 as a crowd of 7,494 saw Artis Gilmore score 37. The next night in San Diego the Colonels fell in overtime to the Conquistadors 133–128; Bo Lamar led all scorers with 40 points before 2,759 fans.

February 18 saw Kentucky win on the road against the Virginia Squires 121–104; Artis Gilmore and Red Robbins led all scorers with 29 points each. The next night in Louisville the Colonels downed the Spirits of St. Louis 114–107; Dan Issel had a game-high 37 before 7,623 fans. On February 21 the Colonels lost at home to the San Diego Conquistadors 110–108; 8,411 fans saw Bo Lamar and Wil Jones lead all scorers with 21 each. Another loss came the following night on the San Antonio Spurs' home court; Dan Issel put in 31 but the Spurs won 110–108 before 7,764 fans. The next night Kentucky dropped another road game, this time 109–107 before 7,429 Denver Nuggets fans despite Artis Gilmore's 27 points. The next evening, in their fourth game in four days, the Colonels won at home 109–87 against the Memphis Sounds; 5,284 saw Artis Gilmore score 33. After a one-day break Kentucky returned to action on February 26 with a 101–99 home win against the Indiana Pacers; 9,884 fans saw the Colonels overcome George McGinnis' 43 points.

Kentucky went 10–5 in February to move their season mark to 44–19 (.698).

==== March 1975 ====
The Colonels opened March at home against the New York Nets, winning 95–84 behind Dan Issel's 29 points as 16,188 fans watched. The next night in Louisville the San Antonio Spurs defeated the Colonels 103–98 despite Artis Gilmore's 35 points and a home crowd of 9,463 fans. March 5 saw the Colonels lose on the road to the Indianapolis Pacers 103–90 as 10,719 saw Gilmore and Darnell Hillman each score 33 for their team. On March 7 the Colonels won on the road against the Virginia Squires 107–95; Gilmore scored 35 before 3,047 fans in Hampton Roads. The next night the Colonels won at home against the New York Nets as Gilmore scored 26 before 13,691 fans. The next night, March 9, saw a 103–92 road loss to the Spirits of St. Louis as 4,919 Spirits fans saw Maurice Lucas score 30.

On March 12 the Colonels took the floor as the home team in Lexington, Kentucky, against the Denver Nuggets; 6,488 fans saw the Colonels prevail 108–103 as Artis Gilmore scored 30 points with 15 field goals. On March 14 the Colonels lost on the road to the Memphis Sounds 103–100 as Dan Issel scored 28 before 6,703 fans. The following night in San Diego the Colonels defeated the Conquistadors 113–98 as Caldwell Jones scored 26 before 2,602 spectators. On March 16 the Colonels lost in overtime on the road to the Denver Nuggets 128–125; attendance was 7,398. March 19 saw the Colonels lose on the road to the Utah Stars 100–92; 7,543 attended.

On March 21 the Colonels lost on the road to the New York Nets 115–101; 13,458 saw Julius Erving score 37 points. On March 23 the Colonels returned home and defeated the Spirits of St. Louis 121–110 despite Marvin Barnes scoring 36 points before 7,493 fans. On March 24 the Colonels returned to Lexington and defeated the Utah Stars 99–84 as 7,288 fans saw both Issel and Gilmore score 22 points each. On March 26 the Colonels scored a road win against the New York Nets, prevailing 103–102 despite Julius Erving scoring 37 points before the New York crowd of 8,768. On March 28 the Colonels won on the road 110–88 against the Virginia Squires; 5,703 attended in Norfolk as Artis Gilmore put in 28. The following night Dan Issel scored 38 points in Freedom Hall before 11,874 fans as the Colonels beat the New York Nets 126–95. On March 30 in Memphis both Artis Gilmore and the Sounds' George Carter each had 32 points as the Colonels defeated the Memphis Sounds in overtime, 113–109, before 4,081 fans. The next night in Lexington the Colonels defeated the San Antonio Spurs 103–88 as Artis Gilmore put in 36 points before 4,487 fans.

The Colonels went 12–5 in March to improve their season mark to 56–26. The Colonels ended the month in a tie with the New York Nets for first place in the Eastern Division.

==== April 1975 ====
On April 2 6,966 fans came to Freedom Hall to watch the Colonels dispatch the Virginia Squires 88–81. The next night the Colonels won on the road before 5,587 fans against the Memphis Sounds, 103–93.

The Colonels and the New York Nets finished the season tied for first place in the Eastern Division with identical records of 58–26. Although the Colonels had defeated the Nets 6 times to the Nets' 5 wins against the Colonels, a one-game playoff to determine first place in the Eastern Division was scheduled.

== ABA Playoffs ==
=== One game tiebreaker playoff for first place in the Eastern Division ===
The Colonels and the New York Nets met in Louisville's Freedom Hall on April 4 for a one-game playoff to determine which of the two teams tied for first place in the Eastern Division would claim first place. 13,672 attended. Julius Erving scored 34 points for the Nets; Artis Gilmore grabbed 33 rebounds for Kentucky. The Colonels won, 108–99, and moved on to face the fourth place Memphis Sounds in the Eastern Division semifinals as the Nets went against the third place Spirits of St. Louis.

=== ABA Eastern Division Semifinals ===
The Colonels hosted the fourth place Memphis Sounds in Game 1 of their Eastern Division semifinals series on April 6. Kentucky won 98–91 behind Artis Gilmore's 25 points. In Game 2 on April 8 the host Colonels defeated the Sounds 119–105 as Kentucky's Louie Dampier scored 23. On April 10 Game 3 saw the Colonels prevail 101–80 in Memphis as 5,414 fans saw Tom Owens lead all scorers with 33. Kentucky took a 3–0 margin into Game 4 in Memphis on April 11 but the Sounds stayed alive with a 107–93 win in front of 4,771 fans despite Dan Issel's 26 points. Game 5 was played in Louisville on April 13 and the Colonels won the game and the series as Artis Gilmore's 33 points powered Kentucky to a 111–99 win.

ABA Eastern Division Semifinals

Game	Date	Location	Score	Record	Attendance
1	April 6	Kentucky	98–91	1–0	4,107
2	April 8	Kentucky	119–105	2–0	4,787
3	April 10	Memphis	101–80	3–0	5,414
4	April 11	Memphis	93–107	3–1	4,771
5	April 13	Kentucky	111–99	4–1	3,543

Colonels win series, 4–1

=== ABA Eastern Division Finals ===
The Spirits of St. Louis had finished the regular season in third place in the Eastern Division 26 games behind the Nets and Colonels with a record of 32–52. The Nets had claimed Game 1 in their Eastern Division Semifinals series against the Spirits but St. Louis had roared back to reel off four straight wins to advance against the favored Nets, claiming the spot against the Colonels in the Eastern Division semifinals.

Game 1 of the Eastern Division semifinals was played in Louisville on April 21. Kentucky won 112–99 despite Freddie Lewis' 35 points. Game 2 on April 23 saw the Colonels win at home 108–103 despite Marvin Barnes' 43 points.

The series then moved to St. Louis on April 25. The Spirits had lagged in attendance all season but outdrew the Colonels' first two crowds in the series as 10,142 showed up for Game 3. Freddie Lewis scored 32 points and St. Louis defeated Kentucky 103–97. Game 4 saw Artis Gilmore lead all scorers with 33 as the Colonels beat the Spirits 117–98 before 11,688 fans on April 27.

The Spirits and Colonels met for Game 5 in Louisville on April 28. Kentucky's crowd of 8,726 was less than either of the two St. Louis crowds, and Marvin Barnes scored 35 points for the Spirits. Kentucky still won 123–103 and the Colonels advanced to the ABA Finals for the third time.

ABA Eastern Division Finals

Game	Date	Location	Score	Record	Attendance
1	April 21	Kentucky	112–109	1–0	6,612
2	April 23	Kentucky	108–103	2–0	8,422
3	April 25	St. Louis	97–103	2–1	10,142
4	April 27	St. Louis	117–98	3–1	11,688
5	April 28	Kentucky	123–103	4–1	8,726

Colonels win series, 4–1

=== ABA Finals ===
The Denver Nuggets had won the ABA Western Division with the league's best record at 65–19. After dispatching the Utah Stars in the Western Division semifinals the Nuggets had faced the Indiana Pacers in the Western Division Finals after the Pacers eliminated the San Antonio Spurs in the Western Division semifinals. In a hard fought series that went the distance the Pacers had edged the Nuggets in Game 7 of the Western Division finals to return to the ABA Finals for the fifth time. The Pacers had won two of the past three ABA Championships, including edging out the Colonels 4 games to 3 in the 1973 Finals.

On May 13 the Pacers and Colonels met in Freedom Hall for Game 1. 14,368 fans attended and despite George McGinnis' 35 points the Colonels won 120–94. Two nights later the Colonels took Game 2 95–93 despite McGinnis' 30 points. A three-point field goal attempt by the Pacers at the end of the game had been ruled to have been released after the buzzer. Kentucky took a 2–0 advantage to Indianapolis.

On May 17 the Colonels took a commanding 3–0 lead in the series by winning Game 3 in Indianapolis 109–101. 17,388 fans saw Artis Gilmore play a remarkable game as he finished the night with 41 points and 28 rebounds. 2 nights later, the Pacers rebounded to win Game 4 94–86. Dan Issel had 26 points in front of 14,589 fans and the Colonels returned to Louisville with a 3–1 edge in the series.

On May 22 Kentucky and Indiana met in Louisville for Game 5. Billy Knight scored 40 points for the Pacers in front of 16,622 fans; the effort was not enough as the Colonels won 110–105 to claim the 1975 ABA Championship. Artis Gilmore was named the Most Valuable Player of the championship series.

ABA Finals

Game	Date	Location	Score	Record	Attendance
1	May 13	Kentucky	120–94	1–0	14,368
2	May 15	Kentucky	95–93	2–0	13,212
3	May 17	Indiana	109–101	3–0	17,388
4	May 19	Indiana	86–94	3–1	14,589
5	May 22	Kentucky	110–95	4–1	16,622

Colonels win championship series, 4–1

== Player statistics ==
=== Legend ===
- GP: Games played
- GS: Games started
- MPG: Minutes per game
- FG%: Field goal percentage
- 3FG%: 3-point field goal percentage
- FT%: Free throw percentage
- RPG: Rebounds per game
- APG: Assists per game
- SPG: Steals per game
- BPG: Blocks per game
- PPG: Points per game

=== Season ===
Player	GP	GS	MPG	FG%	3FG%	FT%	RPG	APG	SPG	BPG	PPG

== Awards and records ==
=== Awards ===
- Louie Dampier, ABA All Star Game
- Artis Gilmore, All-ABA First Team
- Artis Gilmore, ABA All Star Game
- Artis Gilmore, Most Valuable Player, ABA Finals
- Artis Gilmore, ABA All-Defensive Team
- Dan Issel, ABA All Star Game

=== Records ===
- Artis Gilmore, most minutes played, 1974–75 season (3,493)

== Transactions ==
=== Draft and preseason signings ===
- May 1974: the Colonels purchased Ted McClain from the Carolina Cougars
- June 1974: the Colonels signed Wil Jones

=== Trades ===
- June 1974: the Colonels trade a draft choice and cash to the San Antonio Spurs for Bird Averitt
- August 27, 1974: the Colonels traded the rights to Al Eberhard to the Denver Nuggets for Marv Roberts
- December 1974: Red Robbins sold to the Virginia Squires
- January 15, 1975: John Roche sold to the Utah Stars

== Legacy ==
Hubie Brown, the 1974–75 Colonels coach, was named NBA Coach of the Year two different times and went on to the Hall of Fame. Brown was a coach with the 1973–74 Milwaukee Bucks, which made the 1974 NBA Finals with future Hall of Famers Kareem Abdul-Jabbar and Oscar Robertson and lost in seven games to a legendary Boston Celtics championship team. Brown was also head coach of the Atlanta Hawks, New York Knicks (with Patrick Ewing) and Memphis Grizzlies. Of the 1975–75 Kentucky Colonels, Brown said: "The 1975 Kentucky Colonels were the best team I have ever coached. No other team has even come close. They were just a great, great team because they had perimeter scoring in Dampier and Issel, they had Gilmore at the low box. Teddy McClain could guard anybody in either league. Gene Littles was a hell of a defensive player. Wil Jones and Marv Roberts combined for over 20 points a game and we never ran any plays for them . . . . We went 22-3 in the last 25 games of the season and 12-3 in the playoffs."

Colonels owner John Y. Brown, Jr. challenged the NBA champion Golden State Warriors to play the Colonels, offering to pay the NBA $1 million if the Warriors could defeat the Colonels. The Warriors and NBA declined. However, the two teams did meet on October 8, 1975, at Freedom Hall in Louisville. The Colonels won the matchup of the league champions, 93–90.
