= 1974–75 Memphis Sounds season =

- Head coach: Joe Mullaney
- Owners: Isaac Hayes; Avron Fogelman; Kemmons Wilson; Mike Storen
- Arena: Mid-South Coliseum

Results
- Record: 27–57 (.321)
- Place: Division: 4th (Eastern)
- Playoff finish: Division Semifinals (lost to the Colonels 1–4)
- Radio: WLOK

The 1974–75 Memphis Sounds season was the fifth and final season of basketball in Memphis in the American Basketball Association (ABA), as well as their eighth and final official season of play when including the seasons they played in New Orleans under the New Orleans Buccaneers name. Charles O. Finley had failed in running the Tams, and he let the league take the team from his reigns after two years of ownership. In July 1974, a group led by Isaac Hayes, Avron Fogelman, Kemmons Wilson, and former ABA Commissioner Mike Storen (who resigned from his duties there on July 17, 1974) took the team over. The team was renamed to the Sounds, primarily to help the team sound more professional to locals over previous team names in the "Pros" and "Tams" (which worked since the new name was met with much greater fanfare by the locals by comparison to the other two team names), and players were soon dealt to and away from Memphis in an attempt to reverse the team's fortunes quickly. One of the most notable players the Sounds acquired was three-time ABA champion and seven-time ABA All-Star Mel Daniels from the Indiana Pacers, who Memphis had hoped to provide a stable, veteran presence for the younger team on display. Unfortunately for both the Sounds and Daniels alike, the formerly constant All-Star would deal with serious injury problems involving both his stomach and his back throughout the season, which not only caused him to miss out on his first All-Star Game throughout his entire ABA career up until that point in time, but would later signify the end of his ABA career the following season afterward, as well as his professional basketball career years later.

The March 28, 1975 game saw 8,417 people see a victory over the New York Nets 111–106, which was the largest crowd to see the Memphis basketball team play for in years. The Sounds improved their record by six games from their last season under the Tams name, and due in part to a weak division, took the final playoff spot by 12 games over the Virginia Squires, the first time Memphis had made a playoff series since 1971 back when they were the Pros. In the Eastern Division Semifinals, the Sounds lost to the eventual champion Kentucky Colonels in 5 games. Unfortunately for the Sounds, Wilson and Hayes had to share their shares after the season ended due to losing money on the team, thus continuing their rotten luck with ownership out in Memphis. Afterwards, the league gave the Sounds until June 1, 1975, to sell 4,000 season tickets, find new investors, and secure a more favorable lease at the Mid-South Coliseum, but the deadline passed by with failure. Despite that notion, the Sounds still participated in the 1975 ABA draft with the intention of finding new ownership elsewhere later on down the line. On August 27, 1975, a group headed by David Cohan purchased the team and the franchise moved to Baltimore to initially become the Baltimore Hustlers before later becoming the Baltimore Claws. However, the new Baltimore team never played a regular season game despite playing three preseason games, thus making this the official final season of play in franchise history. Memphis would eventually gain a second chance at professional basketball when the Canadian-based Vancouver Grizzlies NBA franchise moved to Memphis in 2001 to become the Memphis Grizzlies ever since then.

== ABA Draft ==
Round	Pick	Player	Position(s)	Nationality	College
1	2	Scott Wedman	SF	United States	Colorado
2	11	Foots Walker	PG	United States	West Georgia College
3	21	Bobby Wilson	SG	United States	Wichita State
4	31	Glenn McDonald	SG/SF	United States	Long Beach State
5	41	Tyrone Medley	G	United States	Utah
6	51	Wolfgang Fengler	PF/C	United States	Delaware
7	61	Lawrence Johnson	F	United States	Prairie View A&M
8	71	Willie Biles	F	United States	Tulsa
9	81	Ron Brown	G	United States	Penn State
10	91	Candy LaPrince	PG	United States	Iowa

Memphis would make their selections while under their initial Memphis Tams name. Also does not include selections from the "ABA Draft of NBA Players" done immediately afterward.

=== ABA Draft of NBA Players ===
Round	Pick	Player	Position(s)	Nationality	College	NBA Team
1	2	Rick Roberson	PF/C	United States	Cincinnati	Portland Trail Blazers
2	11	Norm Van Lier	PG	United States	Saint Francis College (Pennsylvania)	Chicago Bulls
3	22	Lenny Wilkens	PG	United States	Providence	Cleveland Cavaliers
4	31	Paul Silas	PF	United States	Creighton	Boston Celtics
5	42	Dave DeBusschere	SF/PF	United States	Detroit	New York Knicks

The "ABA Draft of NBA Players" that was done on April 17, 1974 (back when the Sounds were still the Tams at the time) happened immediately after the actual ABA Draft done for this season was concluded on that day. None of the five players drafted by Memphis would report to the soon-to-be-rebranded Sounds this season, with Dave DeBusschere notably retiring from the NBA this season to become the general manager of the New York Nets (now known as the Brooklyn Nets) for the season before later becoming the final commissioner of the ABA's entire history the season after that. DeBusschere would also join Lenny Wilkens as the only players drafted by Memphis to become future members of the Naismith Basketball Hall of Fame.

== Roster ==
1974–75 Memphis Sounds roster
Players

Pos.	No.	Player	Height	Weight	DOB	From
SF	19	Roger Brown	6 ft 5 in (1.96 m)	205 lb (93 kg)	May 22, 1942	George W. Wingate High School
SF	7	George Carter	6 ft 4 in (1.93 m)	210 lb (95 kg)	January 10, 1944	St. Bonaventure
C	9	Mel Daniels	6 ft 9 in (2.06 m)	220 lb (100 kg)	July 20, 1944	New Mexico
SG	21	Larry Finch	6 ft 2 in (1.88 m)	185 lb (84 kg)	February 16, 1951	Memphis
PF	11	Stew Johnson	6 ft 8 in (2.03 m)	220 lb (100 kg)	August 19, 1944	Murray State
PF	13	Collis Jones	6 ft 7 in (2.01 m)	203 lb (92 kg)	July 3, 1949	Notre Dame
C	11	Julius Keye	6 ft 10 in (2.08 m)	200 lb (91 kg)	September 5, 1946	Alcorn State
PG	6	Freddie Lewis	6 ft 0 in (1.83 m)	175 lb (79 kg)	July 1, 1943	Arizona State
SG	2	Rick Mount	6 ft 3 in (1.91 m)	175 lb (79 kg)	January 5, 1947	Purdue
PG	15	Jim O'Brien	6 ft 1 in (1.85 m)	170 lb (77 kg)	April 9, 1950	Boston College
C	25	Tom Owens	6 ft 10 in (2.08 m)	215 lb (98 kg)	June 28, 1949	South Carolina
PF	31	Ronnie Robinson	6 ft 8 in (2.03 m)	200 lb (91 kg)	March 9, 1951	Memphis
PG	6	Billy Shepherd	5 ft 10 in (1.78 m)	160 lb (73 kg)	November 18, 1949	Butler
PG	4	Chuck Williams	6 ft 2 in (1.88 m)	175 lb (79 kg)	June 6, 1946	Colorado

Coaches
Head coach
- Joe Mullaney

Legend
- (DP) Unsigned draft pick
- (FA) Free agent
- (S) Suspended
- Injured

Roster

== Final standings ==
=== Eastern Division ===
Team	W	L	PCT.	GB
Kentucky Colonels* C	58	26	.690	-
New York Nets*	58	26	.690	-
Spirits of St. Louis*	32	52	.381	26
Memphis Sounds*	27	57	.321	31
Virginia Squires	15	69	.179	43

Asterisk denotes playoff berth

== ABA Playoffs ==
1975 playoff game log
ABA Eastern Division Semifinals: 1–4 (home: 1–1; road: 0–3)

Game	Date	Team	Score	High points	High rebounds	High assists	Location	Series
1	April 6	@ Kentucky	L 91–98	George Carter 22	Tom Owens 14	Chuck Williams 6	Freedom Hall; 4,107	0–1
2	April 8	@ Kentucky	L 105–119	Carter, Williams 21 each	Tom Owens 9	Chuck Williams 5	Freedom Hall; 4,787	0–2
3	April 10	Kentucky	L 80–101	Tom Owens 33	Tom Owens 12	Chuck Williams 5	Mid-South Coliseum; 5,415	0–3
4	April 11	Kentucky	W 107–93	Stew Johnson 25	Johnson, Carter 11	Chuck Williams 14	Mid-South Coliseum; 4,771	1–3
5	April 13	@ Kentucky	L 99–111	George Carter 26	Tom Owens 17	George Carter 6	Freedom Hall; 3,543	1–4

1971 schedule

Sounds lose series, 4–1

This playoff series would be the last official games played by the Sounds franchise before later folding as the Baltimore Claws following three preseason games played against the Virginia Squires and the Philadelphia 76ers of the NBA.
