= ABA–NBA merger =

Merger of American basketball leagues

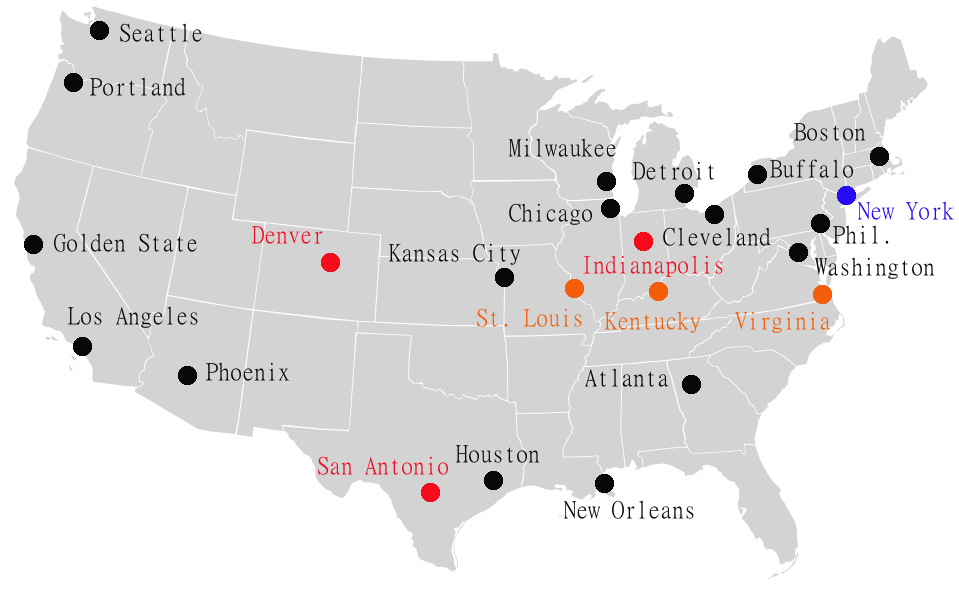
Cities that hosted NBA and ABA teams at the time of the merger in 1976. Pre-existing NBA cities are marked in black. ABA franchises that were accepted into the NBA are marked in red. New York, marked in blue, hosted both leagues. The remaining ABA teams, marked in orange, folded either during merger talks or before talks began in Virginia's case.

The ABA–NBA merger was a major pro sports business maneuver in 1976 when the American Basketball Association (ABA) combined with the National Basketball Association (NBA), after multiple attempts over several years. The NBA and ABA had entered merger talks as early as 1970, but an antitrust suit filed by the head of the NBA players union, Robertson v. National Basketball Ass'n, blocked the merger until 1976.

As part of the merger agreement, the NBA agreed to accept four of the remaining six ABA teams: the Denver Nuggets, Indiana Pacers, New York Nets, and San Antonio Spurs. The remaining two ABA teams, the Kentucky Colonels and the Spirits of St. Louis, folded, with their players entering a dispersal draft. A seventh ABA team, the Virginia Squires, had hoped to enter merger talks as well at the time, but ultimately folded operations a month before they could officially do so due to a failed assessment payment to the ABA during the 1976 ABA Playoffs despite them already not being in the playoffs that year.

== Early attempts at merger ==
From the very beginning, the ABA hoped to force a merger with the NBA, thus repeating the American Football League (AFL)'s successful effort to force a merger with the National Football League (NFL). According to The NBA Encyclopedia, ABA officials told prospective owners that they could get an ABA team for half of what it cost to get an NBA expansion team at the time. The upstart league's officials confidently predicted that if and when a merger occurred, any surviving owners would see their investment more than double. The ABA would get their first and strongest case to try and get a successful merger with the NBA ready by as early as 1968 (the ABA's second year of existence) when they discovered a document that was leaked by a disgruntled ex-employee of the NBA that talked about the order of the 1968 NBA draft, the names of the teams and the players they'd receive, the amount each player would be paid, and most damaging to the NBA and favorable for the ABA, how much each NBA team was to contribute in order to make sure the college stars signed with the NBA instead of with the ABA. (Ironically, the ABA was engaging in the same sort of practices that the NBA was doing at the time, but the ABA did not write their plans out so directly by comparison, which made the idea of an antitrust lawsuit by the ABA possible against the NBA.) On the ABA's end, they had no real long-term plans for survival since they initially hoped to last for around 3–5 years and then either successfully merge with the NBA or fold operations entirely.

In contrast to both the earlier AFL and the later World Hockey Association that had also been founded by the ABA's own people (which both endured significant hostility from their established competitors for many years), the ABA found the NBA owners to be reasonably amenable to a merger relatively early on. On June 18, 1970, only three years after the ABA began play, the NBA owners voted 13–4 (barely being over the 3/4 majority), while the ABA owners unanimously voted 11–0 to jointly seek approval from the U.S. Congress to pass an exception to existing antitrust law in order to merge the rivaling circuits into a single, 28-team league that would retain the NBA name. Seattle SuperSonics owner Sam Schulman, a member of the ABA–NBA merger committee back in 1970, was so ardently eager to merge the leagues together that he publicly announced that if the NBA did not accept the merger agreement that was worked out with the ABA, he would move the SuperSonics franchise from the NBA to the ABA. Schulman also threatened to move his soon-to-be ABA team to Los Angeles to compete directly with the Lakers as well following the Los Angeles Stars moving their franchise to the state of Utah in order to become the Utah Stars. The owners of the Dallas Chaparrals (now the NBA's San Antonio Spurs) were so confident of the impending merger themselves that they suggested that the ABA hold off on scheduling altogether and play a regular season schedule for the 1971–72 NBA season instead. After the 1970–71 season, Basketball Weekly wrote "The American basketball public is clamoring for a merger. So are the NBA and ABA owners, the two commissioners, and every college coach. The war is over. The Armistice will be signed soon". Despite the early claims from those reports at hand, the two leagues continued merger discussions and plans throughout the early and mid-1970s instead.

== The original planned deal and revisions ==
With the original 1970 ABA–NBA merger at hand, in addition to the merger still having the league be called the National Basketball Association combining the 17 NBA teams at the time (with the San Diego Rockets moving to Houston, Texas to become the Houston Rockets and the San Francisco Warriors moving to Oakland, California to become the Golden State Warriors not long after the initial announcement) with the 11 ABA teams at the time (with a few of the ABA teams moving to new locations and/or being renamed not long afterward), the details from that original planned merger would have also included a single-league schedule that was ready as early as practicable, a world championship playoff between the two league winners akin to the Super Bowl or the World Series (with the potential for teams to "move" to different "leagues" as conference replacements similar to Major League Baseball's Milwaukee Brewers and Houston Astros switching around their original leagues ever since they first entered the MLB), a common draft of college players with the 28 teams being utilized, and an expansion by at least two teams to create a 30-team NBA (predating the current number of teams in the NBA from 1995 onward by around 25 years) before the single-league schedule goes into effect as the basic items in mind, with further items in question (such as addressing the conflict of the Houston Rockets and Denver Rockets having the same team name and later player concerns) being added in the event the U.S. Congress approved of the merger. One condition involved during that time had the ABA make sure they didn't sign any more college underclassmen during that time, but that condition was later broken with George McGinnis being signed by the Indiana Pacers, though that didn't become the breaking point for that original deal. A revised agreement would initially be reached a year later on May 4, 1971. The NBA's ratification of the May 1971 deal would have included every team but the Virginia Squires in the merger (Virginia's exclusion related to them being too close to the territory of the Baltimore Bullets (now Washington Wizards) at the time, and the Squires would have to be forced to either move their franchise again to join in or fold operations altogether) in exchange for the ABA to drop their antitrust lawsuit and other legal actions against the NBA, each ABA team paying the NBA $1.25 million over a ten year period, no ABA team having a share in television revenue for two seasons, and the two leagues holding a common draft for college players. That revised merger was approved by the U.S. Senate Antitrust Subcommittee, but the NBA's own reserve clause was considered illegal and thus could not be a part of the merger. Later amendments by the Senate to address that issue, such as replacing the reserve clause with an option clause, as well as having ABA teams not pay $1.25 million to get into the NBA and the notion that players from both leagues should all be signed to one-year contracts with second year options before becoming free agents, were ultimately rejected by both leagues. That would be the last serious attempt at a merger by the two leagues until 1976, following the resolution of another antitrust lawsuit led by Oscar Robertson combined with the ABA losing multiple teams during their final season of existence.

== Robertson v. NBA antitrust lawsuit ==
The early attempts at merging the ABA and NBA were delayed for years by litigation known as the Oscar Robertson suit, styled Robertson v. National Basketball Association, 556 F.2d 682 (2d Cir. 1977). After the NBA owners voted in 1970 to merge with the ABA, the NBA Players Association, led by Robertson, filed a lawsuit in April 1970 to prevent the merger on the basis of antitrust grounds regarding the NBA's players since players were essentially stuck with the rosters they first signed up with via the NBA draft system at the time, with trades being the only viable way to move players around at that period of time. The existence of the ABA resulted in increased salaries for players in both leagues as the ABA and NBA competed with each other to sign players, to the point where each league figured they needed to potentially bankrupt the other league in order to gain the upper hand with signing players to their own league. The Robertson suit was finally settled on February 3, 1976, but for the entirety of its pendency, it presented an insurmountable obstacle to the desired merger of the two leagues in general.

== Congressional action to allow the merger ==
In 1972, Congress came close to enacting legislation to enable a merger despite the Oscar Robertson suit. In September 1972, a merger bill was reported favorably out of a U.S. Senate committee, but the bill was put together to please the owners, and ended up not pleasing the Senators or the players. The bill subsequently died without coming to a floor vote. When Congress reconvened in 1973, another merger bill was presented to the Senate, but that bill did not advance to both leagues whatsoever. As a result of the legislation's failure, the ABA installed a new commissioner, Mike Storen, with part of his focus being the eventual merger of the two leagues being seen as equals to each other, similar to the National League and American League being equals to create the MLB in the early 20th century and the AFL–NFL merger allowing for both the National Football League and rivaling American Football League to see each league as equals to each other. Alex Hannum, who coached in both the NBA and ABA, said at the time of Storen, "The most important problem he has is still the merger with the NBA. And I believe his approach is just right for us. Storen wants to build our league to be the strongest. Then he can negotiate with the NBA as an equal". Sports Illustrated noted at the time that "the tactics Storen says the ABA will employ sound a good deal more like those used by AFL Commissioner Al Davis in the last days of the football war than a plan for peaceful coexistence. The ABA has reinstituted its $300 million antitrust suit against the NBA. It also may move some franchises into better TV markets, an ill-advised maneuver that will mean going against established NBA teams on their home turf. And for the first time since 1970 the ABA will go after established NBA players. 'We will have exploratory contract talks with lots of their men,' Storen says. 'Whether we'll sign none, six or 10 of them will depend on how things work out. But you can be sure of one thing: we'll do this in a serious, orderly way'". As a result of the merger legislation not being enacted and the Oscar Robertson suit continuing, the two leagues did not merge until 1976, after the Oscar Robertson suit had finally been settled.

== Interleague competition in anticipation of merger ==
In the summer before the 1971–72 season, the players from the two leagues met in the NBA–ABA All-Star Game. The NBA won a close game, 125–120. In that same preseason, ABA and NBA teams began playing exhibition games against each other. The first such exhibition was played on September 21, 1971, with Kareem Abdul-Jabbar and the Milwaukee Bucks defeating the Dallas Chaparrals, 106–103. However, the ABA proved to be stronger overall competition during the preseason competitions with that league being 15–10 against the NBA in 1973, 16–7 in 1974, and 31–17 in 1975. Overall, the ABA won more of these interleague games than the NBA did, and in every matchup of reigning champions from the two leagues, the ABA champion won, including the final pre-merger season when the Kentucky Colonels defeated the Golden State Warriors. Boston Globe sportswriter Bob Ryan said of the ABA-NBA exhibition games: "When those exhibition games began, the view in the NBA was, 'Now we'll show those guys.' But then you know what happened—the ABA teams won nearly as often as the NBA did .... Those NBA–ABA games were intense". Longtime NBA coach Larry Brown said of the ABA vs. NBA games, "When some exhibition games were arranged in the 1970s to make some money and we (the ABA) beat them, the NBA said they weren't up for the games. Come on. When I coached Carolina, we played the Knicks after they won a championship. I looked at their guys shooting around and I looked at my guys and I didn't want my players to take off their warm-ups because they looked so scrawny next to the Knicks—and we went out and beat New York. We also played the Celtics a couple of times and beat them. (Celtics coach) Tommy Heinsohn would say that he wasn't playing to win, but I'd check the box score and see that Tommy played his regulars 35 to 40 minutes, so what does that tell you?"

Interest in ABA vs. NBA play extended beyond the two leagues' management. In 1976, CBS sought to establish a postseason playoff between the ABA and NBA, and to win the rights to broadcast those games. Before that, talks of the ABA's championship team competing against the NBA's championship team began as early as 1969 (after the ABA's second season of existence came to a close) when the Oakland Oaks expressed interest in competing against the champions of the NBA that year, the Boston Celtics, to see who truly was the best professional basketball team around. Outside of that, there were also genuine talks from the ABA champions in 1975 when the Kentucky Colonels wanted to compete against the NBA champion Golden State Warriors and in 1976 when the New York Nets expressed their own interests in competing against the Celtics. However, none of those potential championship match-ups for ultimate glory actually came to fruition for postseason play, with preseason competitions during this era being the most any ABA champion could get against the NBA's champions during this era.

== ABA's final season (1975–76) ==
=== Two teams attempt to depart ===
Before the 1975–76 season, the Denver Nuggets and New York Nets both applied to join the NBA earlier than the intended merger of the leagues occurred. The owners of both the Nets and Nuggets had approached John Y. Brown, Jr. in an attempt to get his Kentucky Colonels to join their early attempted leap into the NBA themselves, but Brown refused, saying he was staying loyal to the ABA. Ultimately, the Nets and Nuggets were forced to play a lame-duck season in the ABA by court order. The Nuggets' and Nets' attempted move to the NBA created a great deal of ill will within the ABA, as well as brought attention to the emerging financial weakness of some of the league's lesser teams from that period of time, with the Memphis Sounds soon turned into the Baltimore Claws being the team most immediately in trouble with the ABA due to that squad's own troubled financial situations ever since moving the New Orleans Buccaneers out to Memphis, Tennessee back in 1970.

=== Four teams collapse ===
Meanwhile, the ABA saw three of its teams that were around the previous season (Memphis, San Diego, and Utah) disappear before the end of 1975 occurred, with a fourth team (Virginia) limping through its own season before eventually folding operations before the end of the 1976 ABA Finals despite not even qualifying for the playoffs that season.

The Memphis Sounds would move to Baltimore, Maryland to originally become the Hustlers before controversy with that team name quickly resulted in them changing it to the Claws, but that team folded operations after only three preseason games (one of which was against the Philadelphia 76ers of the NBA and all of them being losses, including their two matches against the Squires of the ABA) after failing to post a performance bond with the league. Before the regular season began in the ABA, the league would host an impromptu dispersal draft where they allowed each ABA team the chance to acquire someone from the defunct Claws franchise.

On November 12, 1975—just three weeks into the regular season—the San Diego Sails (formerly known as the Conquistadors up until the ABA's final season began) folded operations themselves. The Sails had not only been plagued by wretched attendance, but their owner had also learned that the team would most likely be excluded from any upcoming ABA–NBA merger because Los Angeles Lakers owner Jack Kent Cooke did not want competition in Southern California for either his team or their television coverage on the cable television system he owned. The Sails' players were put into a special dispersal draft, though only three of their players would be drafted by two of the now-eight remaining ABA teams by that time.

Shortly after the Sails folded operations, the Utah Stars, once one of the league's longstanding and successful teams by virtue of them winning the 1971 ABA Finals and having a loyal fanbase to match, folded operations as well on December 2, 1975, as a result of the Stars not making payroll. Bill Daniels, the Stars' owner, was out of money due to his unsuccessful campaign to become Governor of Colorado years prior and difficulties with other business ventures on the side (Daniels eventually paid back all Stars season ticket holders in full, plus 8% interest). There had been talks between the Stars and the Spirits of St. Louis about the two teams merging themselves, but the Stars declined the deal and folded before it could potentially happen. Most of the important Stars players, including future Hall of Famer Moses Malone, were sold to the Spirits of St. Louis in an opportunity to help that franchise out for the season. With the ABA cut down to seven teams, the league abandoned divisional play entirely, with the 1976 ABA All-Star Game essentially being the Denver Nuggets (who not only had the best record by that point, but also agreed to host what would become the final ABA All-Star Game that year, before learning about what would happen to some of the league's teams not long afterward) against who were considered the rest of the league's All-Star players.

Another ABA team, the Virginia Squires, struggled considerably during its final two years. The Squires had sold off multiple fan favorite players throughout the years, such as Rick Barry and Warren Jabali, prior to the team's move to the state of Virginia; as well as Billy Paultz before he even had a chance to play for the franchise; and Julius Erving, Swen Nater, and George Gervin (the last of whom resulted in a failed court case being involved) because of constant financial problems. In the 1974–75 season, the once-successful Squires posted a league's-worst record of 15–69. In the 1975–76 season, the Squires essentially tied their own record, posting the league's nearly-identical worst win-loss record (missing only one game played entirely in order to match the record properly). Moreover, due to dwindling attendance, the Squires were essentially fighting just to survive up until the very end of the season. On several occasions, the Squires barely even made payroll, relying on marketing gimmicks to essentially survive their operations entirely. By the end of the 1975–76 season, the Squires were at the end of their tether. They ultimately were folded by the league on May 11, 1976, two days before the 1976 ABA Finals officially concluded, after failing to pay a $75,000 league assessment, which would have essentially been the last payment to make before the ABA's final merger talks with the NBA began. However, there was virtually no chance of them being included in the merger regardless of whether they did make the final payroll at hand or not. The Squires were a "regional" franchise that played home games in three Virginia cities. Regional franchises were not considered viable, and none of the Squires' "home" cities were nearly large enough to support an NBA team at the time. They were also considered a disaster from within the ABA's operations in terms of teams that were surviving by then due to the team barely being able to afford payroll for the ABA in general, never mind a pay raise up into the NBA, making the franchise an obvious cut even before the team folded operations earlier that year. Not only that, but the team already created some unintended beef with Washington Bullets owner Abe Pollin, who did not like the fact that the owners of the Squires previously wanted to join the NBA on turf that he already set his eyes on himself with his own franchise, to the point of leaving the Squires out of the initial merger talks in the early 1970s unless they moved out of Virginia entirely. However, unlike the other teams that didn't survive up until merger talks began, the Virginia franchise would still be well-reminded in regards to the merger talks by at least one franchise.

== Final six ==
The Kentucky Colonels, led by Artis Gilmore, defeated the Indiana Pacers in the first round of the 1976 ABA Playoffs. The Colonels, in turn, lost a seven-game semifinal series to the Denver Nuggets, led by Dan Issel and David Thompson. The Nuggets, in turn, lost the ABA Finals to the New York Nets with Julius Erving, who had defeated George Gervin and the San Antonio Spurs to get there. The Spirits of St. Louis and their star player, Moses Malone, had survived the regular season intact despite low attendance numbers throughout the season, but missed the playoffs in the process. After the Squires folded, six teams were still standing as the ABA and NBA, with the Oscar Robertson suit settled, commenced their final merger negotiations. The merger was finally consummated on June 17, 1976, at the NBA league meetings in the Cape Cod Room at Dunfey's Hyannis Resort in Hyannis, Massachusetts.

== Two ABA teams folded ==
=== Kentucky Colonels ===
The Colonels were one of the strongest franchises throughout the history of the ABA. In addition, the Kentucky Colonels–Indiana Pacers rivalry was the league's fiercest, and in all of professional basketball (NBA included), the Colonels ranked sixth in attendance. In spite of that history, the Colonels' final games came in the 1976 ABA Playoffs as the defending champions bested the Pacers to advance to the semifinals before bowing out to the Nuggets in a tight seven-game series. John Y. Brown, Jr., the owner of the Colonels, preceded the 1975–76 season by selling star center Dan Issel for $500,000 to the Baltimore Claws. However, when the money never arrived, Brown sent Issel to the Nuggets. Shortly afterward, he sent defensive standout Teddy McClain to the New York Nets for $150,000. Those transactions, especially the sale of former University of Kentucky star Issel, turned off many of the Colonels' fans. Though it was clear to everyone that the Colonels had the talent and the fan support to join the NBA for the 1976–77 season, in the face of various obstacles, Brown had other plans.

During the merger negotiations in June 1976, the NBA made it clear that it would accept only four ABA teams, not five. The Nuggets and Nets, clearly the ABA's two strongest teams, were obvious choices. The Spurs had posted impressive attendance numbers since moving from Dallas, and were thus a very attractive choice. On paper, the Colonels were the logical choice for the fourth and final team, and likely would have joined the NBA if not for the intervention of the Chicago Bulls. The Bulls held the NBA rights to Colonels star Artis Gilmore, and badly wanted him on their roster. Thus, the Bulls fought hard to keep the Colonels out of the merger.

After the Colonels, the Indiana Pacers were the next most viable choice. While the Bulls realized an NBA team in Indianapolis would significantly encroach on their own fanbase and television market, they nevertheless had a number of strong incentives to support Indiana's entry into the NBA over Kentucky's. First, the Bulls were themselves a relatively young franchise, only pre-dating the ABA and the Pacers by one year, and thus had never been able to develop much of a following in Indiana to begin with. The Bulls knew if they were to be seen as having a hand in the Pacers' demise, they could never expect to be forgiven let alone supported by Indiana basketball fans. Moreover, Indianapolis also had what was (at the time) a relatively strong World Hockey Association team, the Indianapolis Racers. Whereas Kentucky was never a part of the WHA, the Racers were still then seen to be likely to be included in any NHL–WHA merger that might happen, especially if they no longer had a major professional basketball team to compete with. Furthermore, since the entry of the Milwaukee Bucks into the league had blossomed into a lucrative local rivalry for the Bulls, the team decided it would be more profitable to bring Indiana into the NBA as opposed to trying to keep the Pacers out.

Brown saw the writing on the wall and decided that it was better to fold the Colonels for cash, instead of continuing to fight. On June 17, 1976, the Colonels reached a financial agreement with the remaining teams in the ABA and agreed to fold in exchange for $3 million. According to the terms of the ABA–NBA merger the Kentucky Colonels players were placed into a dispersal draft (along with the players from the Spirits of St. Louis). The Chicago Bulls took Gilmore for $1.1 million. The Portland Trail Blazers took Maurice Lucas for $300,000, the Buffalo Braves took Bird Averitt for $125,000, the Indiana Pacers took Wil Jones for $50,000, the New York Nets took Jan van Breda Kolff for $60,000, and the San Antonio Spurs took Louie Dampier for $20,000.

With the funds he received from the agreement with the other ABA teams and Colonels players sold in the dispersal draft, Brown promptly turned around and bought the NBA's Buffalo Braves for $1.5 million.. Brown's plan was to keep the Colonels alive by moving the Braves to Louisville under the Colonels identity, which would have effectively made the Braves the only NBA casualty of the merger. The money he raised was insufficient to cover the cost of this project, and the city of Buffalo successfully secured an injunction forcing Brown to keep the Braves in Buffalo unless the team's attendance fell to unsustainable levels. Through a systemic dismantling of the Braves roster, this attendance threshold was reached in 1978, and Brown engineered a franchise swap that, for the next year, gave him ownership of the Boston Celtics. (The Braves franchise survives as the modern-day Los Angeles Clippers.)

=== Spirits of St. Louis ===
Brothers Ozzie and Daniel Silna had made a fortune as pioneers in the manufacture of polyester, and they wanted to own an NBA team. After an attempt to purchase the Detroit Pistons fell short, the Silna brothers purchased the ABA's Carolina Cougars franchise with the expectation of moving it into the NBA with the impending merger of the two leagues. The Silna brothers moved the Cougars to St. Louis, because it was then the largest city in the United States without a professional basketball team, and they thought this would make their team more likely to join the NBA. In 1974, the Cougars, roster and all, were overhauled and became the ABA's Spirits of St. Louis from 1974 through 1976. The 1974–75 Spirits had upset the reigning ABA champion New York Nets in the 1975 Eastern Division Finals before losing to the eventual champion Kentucky Colonels, but in the 1975–76 season the Spirits' play was uneven and their attendance waned.

The 1975–76 season had not turned out so well in terms of either attendance or wins on the court. In May 1976, due to attendance problems in St. Louis, the Spirits announced that they were going to move the franchise to Salt Lake City, Utah, to play as the Utah Rockies when a lease agreement for the Salt Palace was arranged. This followed an attempted merger of the Spirits and the Utah Stars franchise during the 1975–76 season, a merger that, had it occurred, contemplated the team leaving St. Louis for Utah. However, the Stars would fold operations before the merger could occur and the Spirits instead bought the rights to some of the Stars' best players, including Moses Malone. In an effort to be included in the ABA–NBA merger, the Spirits' owners, proposed selling the Spirits to a Utah group, buying the Kentucky Colonels franchise, and moving the Colonels to Buffalo to replace the Braves. (Salt Lake City and Miami eventually gained NBA franchises themselves, with Salt Lake City being through the move of the New Orleans Jazz a few years later in 1979 to become the Utah Jazz, and Miami going via expansion in 1988 for the Miami Heat.) The Silna brothers also expressed interest in moving the Spirits team to Hartford, Connecticut, instead, but the Boston Celtics were adamantly against that idea, claiming it was intruding upon their area rights. The Spirits were ultimately not included in the merger, but the Silna brothers nonetheless managed to turn the merger, for them, into one of the greatest deals in the history of professional sports.

In June 1976, the remaining ABA owners agreed, in return for the Spirits folding, to pay the St. Louis owners $2.2 million in cash up front in addition to a 1/7 share of the four remaining teams' television revenues in perpetuity (the 1/7 share being the representation of the initial survival of the seven remaining ABA teams that survived the final ABA regular season banding together in the merger talks with the expectation of at least one franchise being left behind before the Virginia Squires' late folding left the league down to only six teams by the time final merger talks began). As the NBA's popularity exploded in the 1980s and 1990s, the league's television rights were sold to CBS and then NBC, and additional deals were struck with the TNT and TBS cable networks; league television revenue soared into the hundreds of millions of dollars. The Silna brothers continued to receive millions of dollars in television revenue from the NBA until reaching a revised agreement in April 2014, which included a $500 million payment to the Silna brothers from the four former ABA teams.

The terms of the ABA–NBA merger included the Spirits of St. Louis players being put into a special dispersal draft along with the Kentucky Colonels players. Marvin Barnes went to the Detroit Pistons for $500,000, Moses Malone went to the Portland Trail Blazers for $300,000, Ron Boone went to the Kansas City Kings for $250,000, Randy Denton went to the New York Knicks for $50,000, and Mike Barr went to the Kansas City Kings for $15,000.

Twelve players from the final two Spirits of St. Louis rosters (1974–76) played in the NBA during the 1976–77 season and beyond: Maurice Lucas, Ron Boone, Marvin Barnes, Caldwell Jones, Lonnie Shelton, Steve Green, Gus Gerard, Moses Malone, Don Adams, Don Chaney, M. L. Carr and Freddie Lewis.

== Merger terms for the four ABA teams ==
The NBA imposed the following terms on the four surviving ABA refugees—the Denver Nuggets, Indiana Pacers, New York Nets and San Antonio Spurs:

- The new teams' arrival was treated as an expansion, not a merger. Each of the four remaining ABA teams had to pay a $3.2 million expansion fee to the NBA by September 15, 1976. The NBA also refused to recognize ABA records.
- The New York Nets were to pay an additional $4.8 million indemnity directly to their in-town rival, the New York Knicks, as compensation for "invading" the New York area.
- The four ABA teams would receive no television money at all during their first three seasons in the NBA (1976–1979), and were to pay one-seventh of their annual television revenues after that to the owners of the defunct Spirits of St. Louis in perpetuity.
- The four ABA teams would receive no votes related to the distribution of gate receipts or the alignment of NBA divisions for two years (1976–1978).
- The remaining players from the Kentucky Colonels and the Spirits of St. Louis would be made available to NBA teams through a dispersal draft, with superstars such as Artis Gilmore and Moses Malone going to teams other than the four ABA teams.
- The four ABA teams, as new NBA franchises, would not be allowed to participate in the 1976 NBA draft, but were allowed to select players from the Colonels and Spirits in the dispersal draft.

Compared to the other mergers of the 1970s, the terms of the merger in basketball are generally seen as falling between the earlier merger in football and the later merger in hockey. The indemnities and other penalties were at least as draconian as the penalties that the AFL teams in existing NFL markets faced as a consequence of the AFL–NFL merger in 1970; however, among the notable concessions from the NFL were that no AFL teams were forced to fold operations and the AFL's records were fully integrated into the older league's history, including certain draft years. On the other hand, the NBA did permit most of the surviving ABA teams to enter the league with their rosters intact (although some ABA players were promptly sold to help the ABA owners meet their financial obligations), whereas in addition to financial and draft terms being at least as harsh as those endured by the ABA, the WHA teams lost most of their existing players without compensation in a "reclamation draft" once they joined the National Hockey League.

The Nets offered their superstar forward Julius Erving to the Knicks in return for waiving the $4.8 million indemnity fee, but the Knicks declined the offer. Instead, Erving was sent to the Philadelphia 76ers for $3 million as a means of surviving beyond the merger. In effect, the Nets traded their franchise player for a berth in the NBA.

== Results of the ABA–NBA merger ==
=== Immediate results ===
In the first NBA All-Star Game after the merger, 10 of the 24 NBA All-Stars were former ABA players.

In the first post-merger season's NBA Finals between the Portland Trail Blazers and the Philadelphia 76ers, five of the ten starting players were former ABA players. Those five starters from the ABA were Julius Erving, Caldwell Jones, George McGinnis, Dave Twardzik and Maurice Lucas.

Of the 84 players in the ABA at the time of the merger, 63 played in the NBA during the 1976–77 season. In that first post-merger season, four of the NBA's top ten scorers had come over from the ABA (Billy Knight, David Thompson, Dan Issel and George Gervin).

In 1976-1977 NBA MVP standings, 7 out of the 12 best players came from the ABA: Julius Erving, Moses Malone, David Thompson, Maurice Lucas, Artis Gilmore, George Gervin, and George McGinnis, and in the next season 5 out of 10. Moses Malone would eventually become the final ABA player to survive the league merger, being able to remain in the NBA all the way until 1995 at 39 years old after coming to the ABA directly out of high school.

Don Buse, who joined the NBA with the Pacers, led the NBA in both steals and assists during that first post-merger season. The Spirits of St. Louis' Moses Malone finished third in rebounding; the Kentucky Colonels' Artis Gilmore was fourth. Gilmore and his former Colonels teammate Caldwell Jones were both among the top five in the NBA in blocked shots.

Tom Nissalke left the ABA to coach the NBA's Houston Rockets in the first post-merger season and won the Central Division; Nissalke was named NBA Coach of the Year. Former Kentucky Colonels coach Hubie Brown took over the NBA's Atlanta Hawks, and the four former ABA teams kept their coaches as they entered the NBA.

=== Denver Nuggets ===
In 1974, Denver changed its name from the Denver Rockets to the Denver Nuggets in anticipation of the ABA–NBA merger, because the NBA already had a team called the Houston Rockets.

In their first NBA season, the Nuggets—a team that had never won an ABA championship—finished with the league's second-best record, 50–32, and won the Midwest Division. In their second NBA season, the Nuggets repeated as Midwest Division champions, and in their third season the Nuggets missed a third consecutive division title by a single game. Although the financial and draft penalties caused the team to slip after coach Larry Brown's departure, the Nuggets would remain an NBA power throughout the 1980s. After a period of mediocre play through most of the 1990s and early 2000s, the Nuggets recovered and made the playoffs in ten consecutive seasons (2004 to 2013). In 2023, the Nuggets won their franchise's first NBA Championship.

=== Indiana Pacers ===
After years of being the ABA's strongest team on the court and at the box office, the merger caught the Pacers at an awkward moment financially. As mentioned above, they were included in the merger more or less as an afterthought after the Bulls effectively vetoed the inclusion of the Colonels, who were on far stronger footing financially and in team operations. The Pacers had initially started unloading their own star players during the last ABA season. After their first NBA season came and went, the Pacers resorted to broadcasting a successful telethon in order to survive financially into their second NBA season. In part thanks to the telethon, led by Nancy Leonard (wife of Hall of Fame coach Bobby Leonard), the Pacers' average attendance jumped from 7,615 during the 1976–77 season (which was down from their average attendance of 7,739 during their final season in the ABA), their first in the NBA, to 10,982 during the 1977–78 season.

The Pacers finished their inaugural NBA season with a record of 36–46. Pacers Billy Knight and Don Buse represented Indiana in the NBA All-Star Game. However, this was one of the few bright spots of the Pacers' first 13 years in the NBA. During this time, they had only two non-losing seasons and only two playoff appearances. Finally overcoming the draft and financial penalties imposed in the merger, the Pacers have since reached the Eastern Conference Finals ten times, and played in the 2000 and 2025 NBA Finals, but have yet to win a championship.

=== New York Nets ===
The Nets, severely handicapped by the financial penalties placed upon the team, sold Julius Erving to the Philadelphia 76ers. Nate Archibald, the one bright spot left on the roster, broke his foot and the Nets finished their first NBA season at 22–60, the worst record in the league. After their first NBA season, the Nets moved to New Jersey and had a few more weak seasons there before finally improving in the early 1980s as they overcame the financial penalties imposed on them during the merger. By 1984, the Nets were making the NBA playoffs and by 2002 the Nets finally made the NBA Finals, losing to the Los Angeles Lakers. They made it to the NBA Finals again in 2003, this time losing to the San Antonio Spurs, another former ABA team. In 2012, the Nets moved to Brooklyn, returning to the general New York City area to rival the nearby Knicks there in the process.

Nets' owner Roy Boe said of the merger, "The merger agreement killed the Nets as an NBA franchise. ...The merger agreement got us into the NBA, but it forced me to destroy the team by selling Erving to pay the bill".

=== San Antonio Spurs ===
The Spurs, who could never get past the first round of the ABA playoffs before the merger, won NBA division titles in five of their first six NBA seasons, largely on the strength of superstar guard George Gervin. This was in spite of the financial and draft penalties imposed on the team. The Spurs then went through a period of decline in the late 1980s, but rebounded in the 1990s, and in 1999 became the first former ABA team to both reach and win the NBA Finals; until the end of the 2022–23 season they were the only former ABA team to win a title. They have since won four more NBA titles, in 2003, 2005, 2007 and 2014. In 2003, the NBA Finals matched two former ABA teams, the Spurs and the New Jersey Nets.

== 1976 ABA dispersal draft ==
The rosters of the Kentucky Colonels and Spirits of St. Louis were put into a special dispersal draft in 1976, with draft ordering for the event being based on win-loss records from worst to best when combining the records of teams in both the 1975–76 NBA season and ABA season. In the case of the teams that were in the ABA that survived into the NBA, all of them were already considered some of the best teams in terms of playing record, though the Indiana Pacers were the only team to be an early selection due to their 39–45 record in the ABA being something that would have mostly let them miss the playoffs entirely in the NBA that season, while the San Antonio Spurs, New York Nets, and Denver Nuggets would have picked at the equivalent of 17th, 19th, and 21st picks of that draft (with the ABA champion Nets being behind the NBA champion Boston Celtics and Denver being behind only the Golden State Warriors in terms of selections that year) had every team used their first-round selections there. The dispersal draft would have also lasted for upwards to three rounds had teams opted to use them all, but only one team in the Kansas City Kings even bothered using up their second round pick at all in this draft, with no teams even using the third round at all. Two dispersal round trades also occurred around this time as well, with one of them resulting in one of the teams being an immediate championship winner following the 1977 NBA Finals.

^	Denotes player who has been inducted to the Naismith Memorial Basketball Hall of Fame
*	Denotes player who has been selected for at least one All-Star Game and All-NBA Team
^{#}	Denotes player who has never appeared in an NBA regular-season or playoff game

Round	Pick	Player	Pos.	Nationality	Team	ABA team	Signing price	Ref.
1	1	Artis Gilmore^{^}	C	United States	Chicago Bulls	Kentucky Colonels	$1,100,000	
1	2	Maurice Lucas*	F/C	United States	Portland Trail Blazers (from Atlanta)	Kentucky Colonels	$300,000	
1	3	Ron Boone	G/F	United States	Kansas City Kings	Spirits of St. Louis	$250,000	
1	4	Marvin Barnes	F/C	United States	Detroit Pistons	Spirits of St. Louis	$500,000	
1	5	Moses Malone^	F/C	United States	Portland Trail Blazers	Spirits of St. Louis	$350,000	
1	6	Randy Denton	C	United States	New York Knicks	Spirits of St. Louis	$50,000	
1	7	Bird Averitt	G	United States	Buffalo Braves (from Milwaukee)	Kentucky Colonels	$125,000	
1	8	Wil Jones	F	United States	Indiana Pacers	Kentucky Colonels	$50,000	
1	9	Ron Thomas^{#}	F/C	United States	Houston Rockets	Kentucky Colonels	$15,000	
1	10	Louie Dampier^{^}	G	United States	San Antonio Spurs	Kentucky Colonels	$20,000	
1	11	Jan van Breda Kolff	G/F	United States	New York Nets	Kentucky Colonels	$60,000	
2	12	Mike Barr	G	United States	Kansas City Kings	Spirits of St. Louis	$15,000	

a: The Atlanta Hawks traded the ABA dispersal draft rights of Maurice Lucas to the Portland Trail Blazers for Steve Hawes and Geoff Petrie.
b: The Buffalo Braves swapped around ABA dispersal draft right spots with the Milwaukee Bucks (leading to Buffalo drafting Bird Averitt and Milwaukee not drafting anyone with their new spot whatsoever), with the Bucks also getting the Braves' 1977 second round pick (which became Glen Williams) as secondary compensation for not using their dispersal draft pick when they had the chance to do so.

Other players that were also available in the dispersal draft that were not selected included the Kentucky Colonels' Jimmie Baker, Jimmy Dan Conner, Allen Murphy, and Johnny Neumann and the Spirits of St. Louis' Mike D'Antoni, Steve Green, Freddie Lewis, and Barry Parkhill. However, the Spirits' first three players that weren't selected in D'Antoni, Green, and Lewis alongside the Colonels' last two players that weren't selected in Murphy and Neumann would end up seeing some play in the NBA following the dispersal draft's conclusion, with some of these players playing on the surviving ABA teams that made it into the NBA during their NBA careers. In addition to them, former Virginia Squires players from that final season including Jan van Breda Kolff (who was first a part of the Squires before joining the Colonels to end the final ABA season), such as Mel Bennett, Mack Calvin, Fatty Taylor, Luther Burden, Mike Green, Dave Twardzik, Willie Wise, Jim Eakins (who had also previously played for the Squires, but was last playing for the ABA champion Nets before leaving that team sometime either during or after the merger commenced), and Swen Nater would also end up playing in the NBA themselves through other teams following the dispersal draft.

== ABA contributions to NBA play ==
=== 3-point field goal ===
The three-point field goal was used in the ABA; the NBA originally disparaged it, but eventually adopted it in the 1979–80 season.

Angelo Drossos, owner of the San Antonio Spurs: "When the leagues merged, the NBA moguls didn't want the 3-point shot. Red Auerbach hated it and said the Celtics would never go along with it. He had everybody up in arms against the play. Of course, a few years later Red drafted Larry Bird and suddenly he was all for it. And suddenly one of the bigger attractions at the All-Star Game is the 3-point shootout".

=== Slam Dunk Contest ===
The ABA originated the idea of the slam dunk contest at the 1976 ABA All Star Game; the NBA subsequently held their first one in 1984. The slam dunk contest has ever since been a major part of the NBA's All Star Weekend (with the exception of 1998, 1999 and 2021).

=== Pressing and trapping defenses ===
Pressing and trapping defenses, rarely used in the slower-tempo NBA, were common in the ABA, and after the merger began to play a larger role in the NBA.

Billy Cunningham, Philadelphia 76ers star: "When the Knicks were pressing and shooting 3-pointers and all of that under Rick Pitino, people acted as if that was something new. Hey, half the teams in the ABA played like that".

Hubie Brown, former head coach of the Kentucky Colonels, Atlanta Hawks, New York Knicks and Memphis Grizzlies: "We (the ABA) were ahead of the NBA in so many different ways. We had the 3-point play. The NBA said it was a gimmick; now it's one of the most exciting parts of the pro game... About everything we did in the ABA they do now in the NBA except they didn't take our red, white and blue ball". Eventually, the NBA revived the ABA's red, white and blue ball as the "Money Ball" in the NBA's Three-Point Contest.

=== Faster pace of play ===
The ABA had a far faster pace than the NBA, and this carried over into the NBA after the merger; today's NBA game is largely derived from the ABA. Longtime Denver Nuggets head coach and ABA alum Doug Moe, who also coached the Philadelphia 76ers, has commented, "The NBA now plays our (the ABA's) kind of basketball".

=== Drafting of underclassmen ===
Prior to the ABA, the NBA did not allow college underclassmen to enter the league. In 1969 the ABA's Denver Rockets signed Spencer Haywood, a sophomore star at the University of Detroit who had played on the 1968 United States men's Olympic basketball team. The NCAA sued, but Haywood and the ABA prevailed. Future Hall of Famers Julius Erving and George Gervin also joined the ABA's Virginia Squires as underclassmen, as did George McGinnis from Indiana University to the Indiana Pacers, Jim Chones going from Marquette University to the New York Nets, and Ralph Simpson from Michigan State to the Denver Rockets. Moses Malone also joined the ABA's Utah Stars straight out of high school, which later paved the way for them to allow Bill Willoughby to be drafted directly out of high school by the Denver Nuggets in 1975 alongside multiple high school prospects to be draft eligible in the NBA that year. Eventually after the merger happened, the NBA followed suit in allowing for underclassmen to be drafted in the NBA, with high schoolers also having a greater aim into the NBA during the late 1990s and early 2000s decades. Although the practice has never been without its share of critics, the drafting of college underclassmen has become common in the NBA and high school players were also selected in subsequent NBA drafts.

=== Shootaround ===
Shootaround, an informal pre-game practice session, was introduced by Bill Sharman. It has previously been briefly used during 39 games in the American Basketball League (ABL) when Sharman coached the Los Angeles Jets up until that franchise folded and Sharman later joined the Cleveland Pipers as their new head coach before it was then used in the ABA when he coached both the Los Angeles Stars and Utah Stars. The practice would later be used by every basketball team, including teams in the NBA to this day.

=== Statistics ===
In the 1967–68 season, its inaugural, the ABA introduced new statistical categories that would be counted during the games – blocked shots, steals, individual turnovers, separated rebounds to defensive and offensive. Three-pointers made, three-pointers attempted, and team rebounds previously counted only in the NCAA.

The NBA would replicate the same things only from the 1973-1974 season for defensive rebounds, offensive rebounds, steals and blocks, as well as after the merger from 1977-1978 with turnovers and from 1979-1980 with 3-pointers both made and attempted.

== Pension fund ==
When the ABA finally dissolved, so did its pension fund. Players who had played for the ABA prior to the merger had expected to eventually draw on those pensions, only to find the money was gone. In 2014, a class action lawsuit was filed on behalf of 204 former ABA players claiming that the NBA, when it absorbed the ABA, failed to follow the Employee Retirement Income Security Act (ERISA). The suit was settled for a total of $800,000 (less than $4,000 per claimant), but the players, organized into a group called Dropping Dimes, have continued to fight for an equitable share of the NBA profits.

== Legacy ==
- Naismith Memorial Basketball Hall of Fame member Julius Erving: "In my mind, the NBA has just become a bigger version of the ABA. They play the style of game that we did. They sell their stars like we did. The only difference is that they have more resources and can do it on a much grander scale than we in the ABA ever could".
- Denver Nuggets, San Antonio Spurs and Philadelphia 76ers head coach Doug Moe: "One of the biggest disappointments in my life was going into the NBA after the merger. The NBA was a rinky-dink league—listen, I'm very serious about this. The league was run like garbage. There was no camaraderie; a lot of the NBA guys were aloof and thought they were too good to practice or play hard. The NBA All-Star Games were nothing—guys didn't even want to play in them and the fans could [sic] care less about the games. It wasn't until the 1980s, when David Stern became commissioner, that the NBA figured out what the hell they were doing, and what they did was a lot of stuff we had in the ABA—from the 3-point shot to All-Star weekend to the show biz stuff. Now the NBA is like the old ABA. Guys play hard, they show their enthusiasm and there is a closeness in the league. Hell, the ABA might have lost the battle, but we won the war. The NBA now plays our kind of basketball".
- Sportswriter Bob Ryan: "When writers such as Jim O'Brien and Peter Vescey wrote that the two leagues were very close, that some ABA teams were among the top five of all pro basketball teams, I thought they had no objectivity and that they were too close to the teams they were writing about to really understand pro basketball. Then came the merger, and Denver and San Antonio won division titles. What could I say? Guys like Jim O'Brien were right".
- A fictional account of the merger involving a team called the "Flint Tropics" is a major plot point in the 2008 film Semi-Pro.

== See also ==
- AFL–NFL merger
- NHL–WHA merger, also referred to as the 1979 NHL expansion by the NHL.

== Sources ==
- Pluto, Terry, Loose Balls: The Short, Wild Life of the American Basketball Association (Simon & Schuster, 1990), ISBN 978-1-4165-4061-8
- Ray Kennedy, A Celtic Rookie Puts It Together: First-year Commissioner Larry O'Brien used his Irish gift of gab to lead the NBA owners into a merger with the ABA, Sports Illustrated, October 25, 1976
- Pattison, Dan, Count Dracula Has Struck, January 1976
