= Midwestern Conference Men's Basketball Player of the Year =

Annual men's college basketball award

- Awarded for: the most outstanding basketball player in the Midwestern Conference
- Country: United States

History
- First award: 1972
- Final award: 1972

The Midwestern Conference Men's Basketball Player of the Year was an annual award given to the Midwestern Conference's most outstanding player. The award was bestowed for just the 1971–72 season, however. When the Midwestern Conference was founded in 1970–71, men's basketball did not name a league player of the year. In the second season of the conference's existence, Northern Illinois' Jim Bradley won the inaugural award. The conference disbanded after that year due to only having five members, and in order to be recognized by the NCAA, a conference was required to have six or more member institutions.

== Winners ==
Season	Player	School	Position	Class	Reference
1970–71	No award				
1971–72	Jim Bradley	Northern Illinois	F	Sophomore	

== Winners by school ==
School (year joined)	Winners	Years
Northern Illinois (1970)	1	1972
Ball State (1970)	0	—
Illinois State (1970)	0	—
Indiana State (1970)	0	—
Southern Illinois (1970)	0	—
