= 1973–74 Kentucky Colonels season =

- Head coach: Babe McCarthy
- Arena: Freedom Hall

Results
- Record: 53–31 (.631)
- Place: Division: 2nd (Eastern); Conference: 2nd
- Playoff finish: Division Finals (lost to the Nets 0–4)
- Radio: WHAS

The 1973–74 Kentucky Colonels season was their seventh season of existence and in the American Basketball Association. The Colonels finished in second place in the ABA's Eastern Division behind only the New York Nets. They met the Carolina Cougars in the Eastern Division Semifinals and swept them in four games. They met the eventual champion New York Nets in the Eastern Division Finals, where they got swept themselves in four games by the Nets. Despite Babe McCarthy being named the ABA's Coach of the Year this season for his work he did with the Colonels for what ultimately became his only season spent coaching them, he was let go from his position with the team after this season, with McCarthy ultimately never coaching professional basketball ever again after this point in time since he would end up dying from colon cancer a year later on March 17, 1975.

== Offseason ==
=== ABA Draft ===
Interestingly, this year's ABA draft would involve four different types of drafts throughout the early 1973 year: a "Special Circumstances Draft" on January 15, a "Senior Draft" on April 25, an "Undergraduate Draft" also on April 25, and a "Supplemental Draft" on May 18. As such, the following selections were made in these respective drafts by the Colonels.

==== ABA Special Circumstances Draft ====
| Round | Pick | Player | Position | Nationality | College |
|---|---|---|---|---|---|
| 1 | 3 | Ernie DiGregorio | PG | United States | Providence |

Interestingly, the Colonels would be the only team for this specific draft to have just one selection at hand for the "Special Circumstances Draft", with every other team having two picks there outside of the Utah Stars, who themselves acquired three draft picks there. For Kentucky, their only selection would have them acquiring Ernie DiGregorio as the third pick of that particular draft, though DiGregorio would decline playing for the Colonels in the ABA and instead play for the Buffalo Braves and later win the NBA Rookie of the Year Award in 1974.

==== ABA Senior Draft ====
| Round | Pick | Player | Position(s) | Nationality | College |
|---|---|---|---|---|---|
| 1 | 9 | Louie Nelson | PG/SG | United States | Washington |
| 2 | 14 | Derrek Dickey | PF | United States | Cincinnati |
| 2 | 19 | Ron King | SG | United States | Florida State |
| 3 | 29 | M. L. Carr | SG/SF | United States | Guilford College |
| 4 | 39 | Ron Behagen | PF/C | United States | Minnesota |
| 5 | 49 | William Harris | G | United States | North Carolina A&T State |
| 6 | 59 | Mike Boylan | F | United States | Assumption College |
| 7 | 69 | Les Taylor | SF | United States | Murray State |
| 8 | 79 | James Greene | F | United States | Kentucky Wesleyan |
| 9 | 89 | John Johnson | F | United States | Denver (redshirt) |
| 10 | 99 | Mike Macaluso | SG | United States | Canisius College |

The "Senior Draft" done in April is often considered the official, main draft period of the 1973 ABA draft by basketball historians.

==== ABA Undergraduate Draft ====
| Round | Pick | Player | Position | Nationality | College |
|---|---|---|---|---|---|
| 11 (1) | 109 (9) | Don Smith | PG | United States | Dayton |
| 12 (2) | 119 (19) | Jim Forbes | PF | United States | UTEP |

The "Undergraduate Draft" is considered a continuation of the "Senior Draft" that was done earlier that same day, hence the numbering of the rounds and draft picks here.

==== ABA Supplemental Draft ====
| Round | Pick | Player | Position(s) | Nationality | College |
|---|---|---|---|---|---|
| 1 | 6 | Steve Rowell | G | United States | Rhode Island |
| 2 | 14 | James Garvin | PF | United States | Boston University |
| 3 | 22 | Chuck Witt | F | United States | Western Kentucky |
| 4 | 29 | Fran Costello | F | United States | Providence |
| 5 | 35 | Eddie Childress | F | United States | Austin Peay State |
| 6 | 42 | Jerry Clark | F | United States | Skagit Valley College |

None of the six players selected in the "Supplemental Draft" would end up playing for the Colonels, though James Garvin would briefly play in the NBA for the Buffalo Braves in 1973.

=== Preseason transactions ===
On July 31, 1973, the Kentucky Colonels were bought by future Governor of Kentucky John Y. Brown, Jr. and other investors. Famed college coach Adolph Rupp was hired as Vice President of the Board. General Manager Mike Storen resigned from his position and was replaced by Gene Rhodes. Head coach Joe Mullaney left the team in order to become head coach of the Utah Stars, with Babe McCarthy being hired as Mullaney's replacement.

=== Preseason exhibition games ===
Like most ABA teams, the Colonels played several preseason exhibition games against NBA opponents. The first for the 1973–74 preseason came on September 21, 1973, on the Colonels' home court at Freedom Hall in Louisville against the Houston Rockets. Rudy Tomjanovich scored 32 points for the Bulls. Center Artis Gilmore had 22 points and 18 rebounds for the Colonels; his teammate, forward Dan Issel, scored 20. The Colonels won, 110–102.

The next night the Colonels hosted the Kansas City–Omaha Kings. Rick Mount scored 21 points for the Kings; his teammate Nate Archibald scored 19. Guard Louie Dampier led the Colonels with 22 points and Kentucky won 110–99.

== Roster ==
1973–74 Kentucky Colonels roster
Players

| Pos. | No. | Player | Height | Weight | DOB | From |
|---|---|---|---|---|---|---|
| SF | 25 | Jim Bradley | 6 ft 8 in (2.03 m) | 215 lb (98 kg) | March 16, 1952 | Northern Illinois |
| PG | 10 | Louie Dampier | 6 ft 0 in (1.83 m) | 170 lb (77 kg) | November 20, 1944 | Kentucky |
| PG | 32 | Mike Gale | 6 ft 4 in (1.93 m) | 185 lb (84 kg) | July 18, 1950 | Elizabeth City State |
| C | 53 | Artis Gilmore | 7 ft 2 in (2.18 m) | 240 lb (109 kg) | September 21, 1949 | Jacksonville |
| PG | | Joe Hamilton | 5 ft 10 in (1.78 m) | 160 lb (73 kg) | 1948-07-05 | North Texas |
| C | 44 | Dan Issel | 6 ft 9 in (2.06 m) | 235 lb (107 kg) | October 25, 1948 | Kentucky |
| PG | 33 | Billy James | 6 ft 3 in (1.91 m) | 185 lb (84 kg) | February 11, 1950 | Marshall |
| PF | 22 | Collis Jones | 6 ft 7 in (2.01 m) | 203 lb (92 kg) | July 3, 1949 | Notre Dame |
| SG | 35 | Ron King | 6 ft 4 in (1.93 m) | 185 lb (84 kg) | July 11, 1951 | Florida State |
| SF | 4 | Wendell Ladner | 6 ft 5 in (1.96 m) | 220 lb (100 kg) | October 6, 1948 | Southern Miss |
| SG | 30 | Rick Mount | 6 ft 3 in (1.91 m) | 175 lb (79 kg) | January 5, 1947 | Purdue |
| PG | 3 | Jim O'Brien | 6 ft 1 in (1.85 m) | 170 lb (77 kg) | April 9, 1950 | Boston College |
| C | 9 | Red Robbins | 6 ft 8 in (2.03 m) | 190 lb (86 kg) | September 30, 1944 | Tennessee |
| SG | 11 | John Roche | 6 ft 3 in (1.91 m) | 170 lb (77 kg) | September 26, 1949 | South Carolina |
| SF | 2 | Walt Simon | 6 ft 6 in (1.98 m) | 200 lb (91 kg) | December 1, 1939 | Benedict |
| PF | 8 | Ron Thomas | 6 ft 6 in (1.98 m) | 215 lb (98 kg) | November 19, 1950 | Louisville |
| PG | 15 | Chuck Williams | 6 ft 2 in (1.88 m) | 175 lb (79 kg) | June 6, 1946 | Colorado |

Coaches
Head coach

Babe McCarthy

Legend
- (DP) Unsigned draft pick
- (FA) Free agent
- (S) Suspended
- Injured

Roster

== Season standings ==
1973–74 ABA Final Standings
| Eastern Division | W | L | PCT. | GB |
|---|---|---|---|---|
| New York Nets | 55 | 29 | .655 | - |
| Kentucky Colonels | 53 | 31 | .631 | 2 |
| Carolina Cougars | 47 | 37 | .560 | 8 |
| Virginia Squires | 28 | 56 | .333 | 27 |
| Memphis Tams | 21 | 63 | .250 | 34 |
| Western Division | W | L | PCT. | GB |
| Utah Stars | 51 | 33 | .607 | - |
| Indiana Pacers | 46 | 38 | .548 | 5 |
| San Antonio Spurs | 45 | 39 | .536 | 6 |
| San Diego Conquistadors | 37 | 47 | .440 | 14 |
| Denver Rockets | 37 | 47 | .440 | 14 |

=== Game log ===
1973–74 game log
November

| Game | Date | Team | Score | High points | Location Attendance | Record |

December

| Game | Date | Team | Score | High points | Location Attendance | Record |

January

| Game | Date | Team | Score | High points | Location Attendance | Record |

February

| Game | Date | Team | Score | High points | Location Attendance | Record |

March

| Game | Date | Team | Score | High points | Location Attendance | Record |

April

| Game | Date | Team | Score | High points | Location Attendance | Record |

1973–74 season schedule

=== Month by Month ===
==== October 1973 ====
The Colonels opened their season on October 12, 1973, away from their usual home court at Freedom Hall in Louisville, playing instead in Lexington, Kentucky, where stars Dan Issel and Louie Dampier had played college basketball at the University of Kentucky. In front of 8,727 fans Issel scored 27 points to lead the Colonels to a 111–100 victory over the Denver Rockets. The next night in Louisville the Colonels hosted the Utah Stars and won 103–101 in front of 10,476 fans as Issel scored 36. Issel put in 33 points on October 17 as the Colonels won in front of 5,943 home fans against the Virginia Squires 116–106. October 19 brought a road win against the Carolina Cougars, 121–109 as Issel scored 30. The following night saw a rematch of the two teams in front of 7,026 fans in Louisville with the Cougars prevailing 105–102 despite Issel's 29 points. October 24 brought a 100–98 home win against the New York Nets. On October 26 the Colonels won on the road against the Virginia Squires; Louie Dampier's 21 points led Kentucky to a 104–99 victory. The next night in Louisville, Issel's 31 led the Colonels to a 90–87 win against the Denver Rockets in front of 7,223 fans. The Colonels closed out the month with a runaway win at home against the San Diego Conquistadors, 146–105; 7,412 saw Dan Issel lead all scorers with 25. The Colonels closed the first month of the season with 8 wins and 1 loss (.889).

==== November 1973 ====
On November 2 the Colonels notched a road win against the New York Nets, 121–109; John Roche led all scorers with 41 points before 8,678 fans. The two teams met again the next night in Louisville and the Colonels prevailed again, 93–87; the 11,277 fans in attendance saw Roche and Dan Issel lead all scorers with 29 apiece. On November 7 the Colonels hosted the Memphis Tams; attendance was 6,834 as Kentucky won 113–89 behind Issel's 30 points. On November 9 the Colonels hosted the Carolina Cougars in Cincinnati; 6,194 saw the Cougars win 139–110. The next night in Louisville Issel's 31 points led Kentucky to victory over the Virginia Squires 111–107 before 7,988 fans. November 14 saw a rematch with the Carolina Cougars in Louisville and the Colonels again came out on the short end, 107–102, despite Issel's 27 points before 8,121 fans.

November 17 saw the host Colonels defeat the rival Indiana Pacers 100–96; 13,766 turned out for the rivalry game as Issel put in 28 points. On November 21 the Colonels hosted the Virginia Squires in Lexington with 7,656 in attendance and Kentucky won 145–115 despite George Gervin's 31 points. On November 23 the Colonels lost 118–114 on the road to the Indiana Pacers as George McGinnis put in 37 points with 10,079 on hand. The next night the Colonels held court in Cincinnati again and defeated the San Diego Conquistadors 124–121 before 3,421 fans; Dan Issel and Artis Gilmore each score 30 for Kentucky. On November 26 the Colonels' home court was in Bowling Green, Kentucky (in the home gym of Western Kentucky University) and 10,453 turned out to see Kentucky lose their third straight to the Carolina Cougars, 94–82, despite Issel's game-high 27. On November 28 the Colonels drew a capacity crowd (10,146) in the San Diego Conquistadors' home gym and though Issel led all scorers with 36 the Conquistadors won 104–99. The next evening saw the Colonels on the road again, squaring off against the Memphis Tams; Issel scored 32 in front of 5,106 fans and Kentucky won 102–92. The Colonels ended their month on November 30 before 3,116 fans in Cincinnati, losing to the Indiana Pacers 107–104 despite Issel's 31.

The Colonels went 8–6 in November, making it the franchise's worst month in quite some time. Their record for the season dropped to 16–7 (.696).

==== December 1973 ====
On December 1 the Colonels lost in Charlotte, North Carolina, to the Carolina Cougars, 120–113; 6,231 attended and Dan Issel and Billy Cunningham led all scorers with 21 each. The Colonels returned to action on December 7, losing on the road to the Indiana Pacers 105–97 before 8,079 fans despite Issel's game-high 28. The next night in Cincinnati the Colonels lost to the New York Nets 102–87; 4,951 saw Julius Erving and Louie Dampier lead all scorers with 27 each. Kentucky's next game was a road win against the San Antonio Spurs, breaking a four-game losing streak; Dan Issel had a game-high 28 before 7,674 spectators. The Colonels next hosted a game in Cincinnati on December 14, defeating the Memphis Tams 115–94 despite Johnny Neumann's 25; attendance was 2,164, a very low total for Kentucky. The next night in Denver the Colonels defeated the Denver Rockets 120–114; Dan Issel poured in 46 points before 3,890 fans. The next night, December 16, saw Kentucky win on the road 106–101 against the San Diego Conquistadors despite Stew Johnson's game-high 43 for San Diego before 1,764 fans.

The Colonels returned to action on December 19, losing a close one on the road to the New York Nets 83–82; Julius Erving led all scorers with 30 and 7,493 attended. December 21 saw the Colonels lose at home 86–85; Willie Wise put in 29 before 9,102 in Freedom Hall. The next night the two teams met again, this time in the Stars' home arena, the Salt Palace; Utah won again, 86-82 and Willie Wise had a game-high 25 before 6,341 fans. The next night, December 23, saw Kentucky notch a road win against the San Diego Conquistadors, 123–120; 2,368 saw Dan Issel score 31. On December 26 the Colonels manhandled their rivals, the Indiana Pacers, 106–78 in Louisville before 10,811 as Issel put scored a game-high 28. The following evening Kentucky lost before 3,133 fans in Cincinnati to the Denver Rockets, 105–100, despite Artis Gilmore's game-high 29. December 29 saw the Colonels run away with an easy road win against the Memphis Tams, 145–101; Dan Issel had 30 points before a meager crowd of 1,885.

The Colonels split their December games evenly, with 7 wins and 7 losses, their worst month in quite some time. This left their season record at 23-14 (.622) heading into calendar year 1974.

== ABA Playoffs ==
ABA Eastern Division Semifinals

| Game | Date | Location | Score | Record | Attendance |
| 1 | April 1 | Kentucky | 118–102 | 1–0 | 6,749 |
| 2 | April 5 | Greensboro (Carolina) | 99–96 | 2–0 | 8,638 |
| 3 | April 6 | Charlotte (Carolina) | 120–110 | 3–0 | 3,724 |
| 4 | April 8 | Kentucky | 128–119 | 4–0 | 5,243 |

Colonels win series, 4–0

ABA Eastern Division Finals

| Game | Date | Location | Score | Record | Attendance |
| 1 | April 13 | New York | 96–119 | 0–1 | 12,817 |
| 2 | April 15 | New York | 80–99 | 0–2 | 13,726 |
| 3 | April 17 | Kentucky | 87–89 | 0–3 | 13,797 |
| 4 | April 20 | Kentucky | 90–103 | 0–4 | 7,800 |

Colonels lose series, 0–4

== Player statistics ==
=== Legend ===
- GP: Games played
- GS: Games started
- MPG: Minutes per game
- FG%: Field goal percentage
- 3FG%: 3-point field goal percentage
- FT%: Free throw percentage
- RPG: Rebounds per game
- APG: Assists per game
- SPG: Steals per game
- BPG: Blocks per game
- PPG: Points per game

=== Season ===
| Player | GP | GS | MPG | FG% | 3FG% | FT% | RPG | APG | SPG | BPG | PPG |

== Awards and records ==
=== Awards ===
- Louie Dampier, All-Star selection
- Dan Issel, All-Star selection
- Artis Gilmore, All-Star selection
- Babe McCarthy, 1974 ABA All-Star Game (head coach, Eastern)
- Artis Gilmore All-Star Game MVP
- Artis Gilmore, First Team All-ABA
- Artis Gilmore, ABA All-Defensive Team
- Dan Issel, All-ABA Second Team
- Louie Dampier, All-ABA Second Team
- Babe McCarthy, ABA Coach of the Year Award (along with Utah Stars' Joe Mullaney)

=== Records ===
- Louie Dampier, highest 3 point field goal percentage (.387), 1973–74 season
- Artis Gilmore, most minutes played (3502), 1973–74 season
- Artis Gilmore, most rebounds per game (18.3), 1973–74 season
- Artis Gilmore, most blocked shots per game (3.42), 1973–74 season
- Artis Gilmore: February 3, 1974: most rebounds in one game (40) in ABA history:
- Artis Gilmore: February 3, 1974: most defensive rebounds in one game (34) in ABA history
- April 5, 1974: Most errors (turnovers) in an ABA playoff game with 37 total (Kentucky (99), at Carolina Cougars (96))

== Transactions ==
=== ABA Drafts and preseason signings ===
The Colonels drafted Ernie DiGregorio in the special circumstance draft, but he signed with the NBA's Buffalo Braves. The Colonels also drafted M.L. Carr and Ron Behagen, but Carr stayed in college and Behagen signed with the NBA's Kansas City-Omaha Kings. Prior to the season, head coach Joe Mullaney left to coach the Utah Stars and was replaced by Babe McCarthy; at the end of the season McCarthy, despite being named the ABA's Coach of the Year, was fired (never to coach professional basketball again afterward since he would later die from colon cancer a year later on March 17, 1975) and was later replaced by Hubie Brown, who went on to win the 1975 ABA Finals in his first season coaching the team. However, Brown would also be the last coach the franchise ever had in the process.

=== Trades ===
- January 1974: the Colonels traded Jim O'Brien and a first-round draft pick to the San Diego Conquistadors for Red Robbins and Chuck Williams
- January 1974: the Colonels traded Rick Mount to the Utah Stars for a draft choice and cash
- January 24, 1974: the Colonels traded Mike Gale and Wendell Ladner to the New York Nets for John Roche
