= Artis Gilmore =

American basketball player (born 1949)

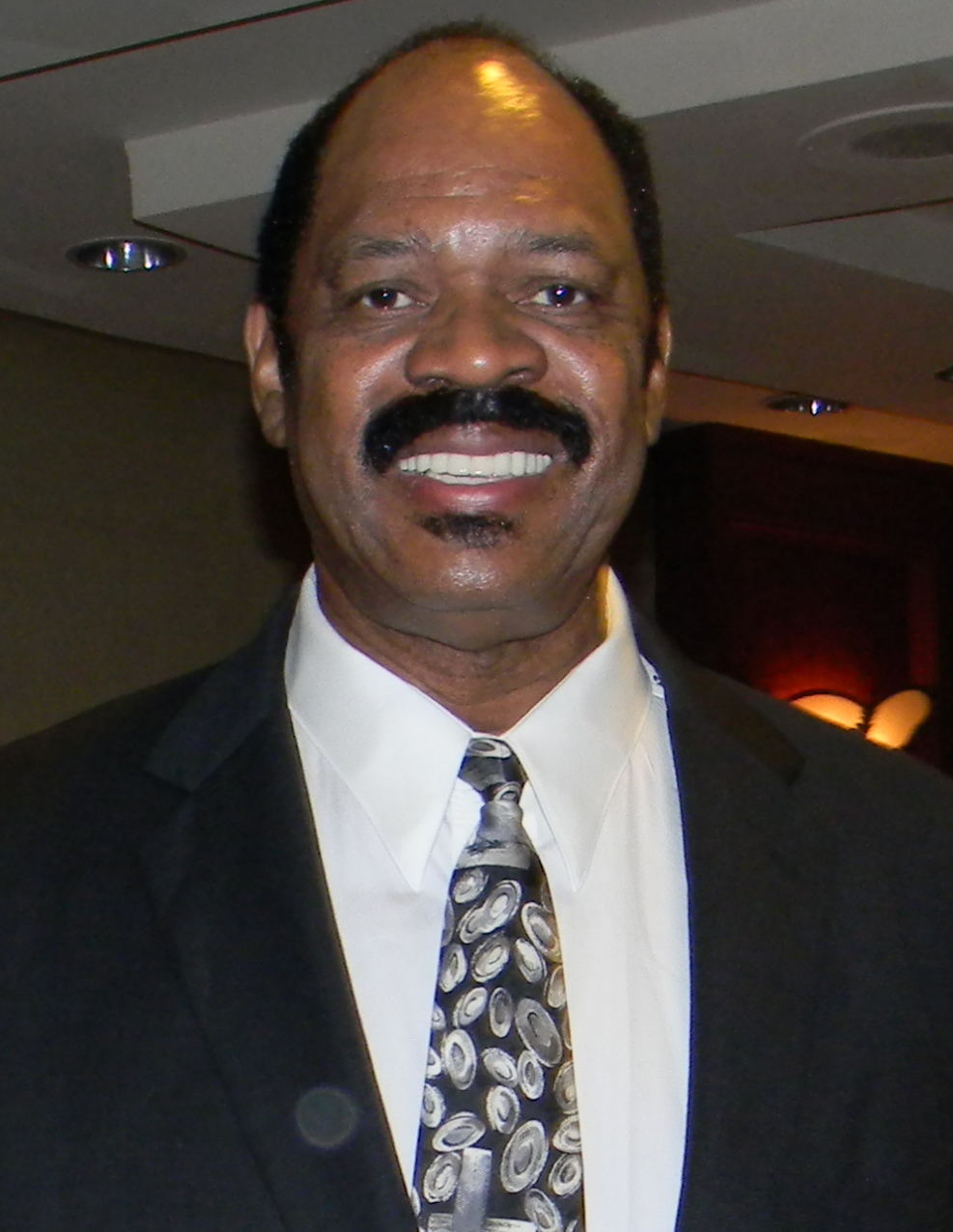
- Gilmore in 2011

Personal information
- Born: September 21, 1949 (age 77) Chipley, Florida, U.S.
- Listed height: 7 ft 2 in (2.18 m)
- Listed weight: 240 lb (109 kg)

Career information
- High school: T. J. Roulhac (Chipley, Florida); Carver (Dothan, Alabama)
- College: Gardner–Webb (1967–1969); Jacksonville (1969–1971)
- NBA draft: 1971: 7th round, 117th overall pick
- Drafted by: Chicago Bulls
- Playing career: 1971–1989
- Position: Center
- Number: 53

Career history
- 1971–1976: Kentucky Colonels
- 1976–1982: Chicago Bulls
- 1982–1987: San Antonio Spurs
- 1987: Chicago Bulls
- 1988: Boston Celtics
- 1988–1989: Arimo Bologna

Career highlights
- ABA champion (1975); ABA Playoffs Most Valuable Player (1975); ABA Most Valuable Player (1972); 6× NBA All-Star (1978, 1979, 1981–1983, 1986); 5× ABA All-Star (1972–1976); ABA All-Star Game MVP (1974); 5× All-ABA First Team (1972–1976); 4× ABA All-Defensive First Team (1973–1976); NBA All-Defensive Second Team (1978); ABA Rookie of the Year (1972); ABA All-Rookie First Team (1972); 4× ABA rebounding champion (1972–1974, 1976); 2× ABA block champion (1973–1974); ABA All-Time Team; Consensus first-team All-American (1971); Second-team All-American – AP, NABC, UPI (1970); 2× NCAA rebounding leader (1970, 1971); No. 53 retired by Jacksonville Dolphins; Third-team Parade All-American (1967)

Career ABA and NBA statistics
- Points: 24,941 (18.8 ppg)
- Rebounds: 16,330 (12.3 rpg)
- Blocks: 3,178 (2.4 bpg)
- Stats at NBA.com
- Stats at Basketball Reference
- Basketball Hall of Fame

Artis Gilmore Sr. (born September 21, 1949) is an American former professional basketball player who played in the American Basketball Association (ABA) and National Basketball Association (NBA). Gilmore was inducted into the Naismith Memorial Basketball Hall of Fame in 2011.

A star center in his two years of college basketball at Jacksonville University, Gilmore led the Dolphins to the NCAA Division I championship game in 1970, where his team was beaten 80–69 by the UCLA Bruins. Averaging 22.6 rebounds per game, Gilmore is second all-time in rebounds per game in Division I history and has the most for all players since 1971.

Gilmore was drafted in both the ABA draft by the Kentucky Colonels and the NBA draft by the Chicago Bulls in 1971. He signed with the Colonels and immediately became one of the most dominant players in the league. In his first season, he won the ABA Rookie of the Year and the ABA Most Valuable Player (MVP) awards. He was an ABA All-Star in all five seasons he played in the league. He was the Playoffs MVP of the 1975 ABA playoffs, recording 28 points and 31 rebounds in the decisive Game 5 for his first and only championship. In the 1976 ABA dispersal draft, which dispersed the players in teams not making the NBA such as the Colonels, Gilmore was moved to the Chicago Bulls. During his career, Gilmore was an 11-time All-Star, the ABA Rookie of the Year, and an ABA Most Valuable Player (MVP). Nicknamed "The A-Train", the 7-foot-2-inch (2.18 m) Gilmore once played in 670 consecutive games. Gilmore would play for the Bulls, the San Antonio Spurs, and Boston Celtics before departing the NBA in 1988; he closed his career out with Arimo Bologna, playing from 1988 to 1989.

== Early years ==
Gilmore was born in Chipley, Florida, one of 10 children. He was raised there, and attended Roulhac High School. Gilmore was 6'5" at age 15. Initially most interested in playing football, Gilmore could not play because his father, who was a fisherman, could not afford the required insurance for him to participate. When public schools were integrated, he attended Chipley High School for one week before leaving home to attend Carver High School in Dothan, Alabama, a larger community 35 miles to the north. He graduated from Dothan's Carver High School in 1967, at 6'10" as a Third Team All-American.

== College career ==
Gilmore played college basketball beginning at Gardner–Webb Junior College in Boiling Springs, North Carolina from 1967 to 1969. Under coach Eddie Holbrook, Gilmore led Gardner–Webb to the NJCAA tournament in 1968 and 1969, playing alongside George Adams. Gilmore averaged 22.5 points and 16.0 rebounds in his two seasons, with career totals of 1,530 points and 1,150 rebounds at Gardner–Webb.

Reflected Coach Holbrook, “Bringing in a player like Artis who was 7-foot-2 and could do so many things drew a lot of attention. But Artis showed that he was deserving of that attention. I would say Artis and George Adams were two of the hardest-working players I ever coached. They were relentless. Anything you asked them to do or pushed them to do, they did it — or tried to do it anyway.”

In 1969–1970, Gilmore transferred to Jacksonville University. He led the Jacksonville Dolphins team to a 27–2 record under coach Joe Williams. In the 1970 NCAA tournament Gilmore led the team to the NCAA Championship game, where they lost 80–69 to coach John Wooden and the UCLA Bruins; Gilmore scored 19 points with 16 rebounds. They defeated Western Kentucky 109–96 (30/19), the University of Iowa 104–103 (30/17) and the University of Kentucky 106–100 (24/20) to reach the Final Four. The Dolphins defeated St. Bonaventure 91–83 (29/21) in the Semi-Final. For the season, Gilmore averaged 26.5 points and 22.2 rebounds per game.

At Jacksonville University, Gilmore became one of five college basketball players ever to average at least 20 points and 20 rebounds over his career at 24.3 and 22.7. Gilmore led the NCAA in rebounding both years at Jacksonville, and his career average of 22.7 rebounds per game is still the highest in NCAA Division I history.

== Professional career ==
=== ABA ===
==== Kentucky Colonels (1971–1976) ====
Gilmore was drafted by the Kentucky Colonels in the 1971 American Basketball Association draft, and by the Chicago Bulls in the 1971 NBA draft. ABA teams were interested in keeping Gilmore in the ABA and wanted to ensure he was signed by a team that could afford him. Therefore, he went to Kentucky with the 7th pick and signed a 10-year, $2.5 million contract. NBA teams knew Gilmore would not sign, so the Bulls strategically used a 7th-round pick to secure any possible future rights to Gilmore.

He was so immediately dominant that he earned the rare distinction of being selected for both the ABA Rookie of the Year Award and the ABA Most Valuable Player Award in 1971–1972, both over Virginia Squires rookie Julius Erving. Kentucky finished 68–16 after being 44–40 the season before. The following season Gilmore's strong play continued, as he and Dan Issel led the Colonels to a 56–28 record and the 1973 ABA Playoffs. Eventually, after beating the Carolina Cougars in a seven-game division finals series, Gilmore and the Colonels made it to the ABA Finals, but lost to the Indiana Pacers in another hard-fought seven-game series, despite Gilmore averaging 22.1 points, 17.3 rebounds, 5.3 assists, and 4 blocks per game.

Over his five-year ABA career, Gilmore led the ABA four times in rebounding average, twice in both field goal percentage and blocks per game, and once in personal fouls. He was named to the All-ABA First team five straight seasons, and the All-Defense team four times. He played in the ABA All-Star Game all five years he was in the league, earning the 1974 game's MVP.

In 1974–75, Gilmore, alongside teammate Dan Issel led 1974–75 Kentucky Colonels to the 1975 ABA championship, as Gilmore was dominant, being named the ABA Playoffs Most Valuable Player. In the final game of the series against the Indiana Pacers, Gilmore scored 28 points and grabbed 31 rebounds in front of 16,000 fans at Freedom Hall.

During his days as an ABA dominator, Gilmore established league records for career blocked shots (1431), blocked shots in a season (422 in the 1971–72 season), and rebounds in a game (40). He averaged 22.3 points and 17.7 rebounds, 58.5% shooting, 3.4 blocks and 3.0 assists per game in his 5 seasons and 440 ABA games"

=== NBA ===
==== Chicago Bulls (1976–1982) ====
The ABA disbanded after the 1976 season. Four of its teams (Denver Nuggets, Indiana Pacers, New York Nets, and San Antonio Spurs) were absorbed into the NBA in the ABA–NBA merger, and the remainder, including the Kentucky Colonels, folded. As a result, Gilmore went into the special 1976 ABA dispersal draft, and was chosen first overall by the Chicago Bulls. He signed with them for $1.1 million over three years. During his first season with the Bulls, Gilmore led the team in scoring, rebounds, and blocks, while also helping the Bulls hold their opponents to a league-best 98 points per game. On March 18, 1977, Gilmore scored an NBA-career-high 42 points, along with grabbing 15 rebounds and recording 9 assists, in a 114–112 win over the Kansas City Kings. However, in the 1977 NBA playoffs, the Bulls lost to the eventual champion Trail Blazers 2–1 in the first round.

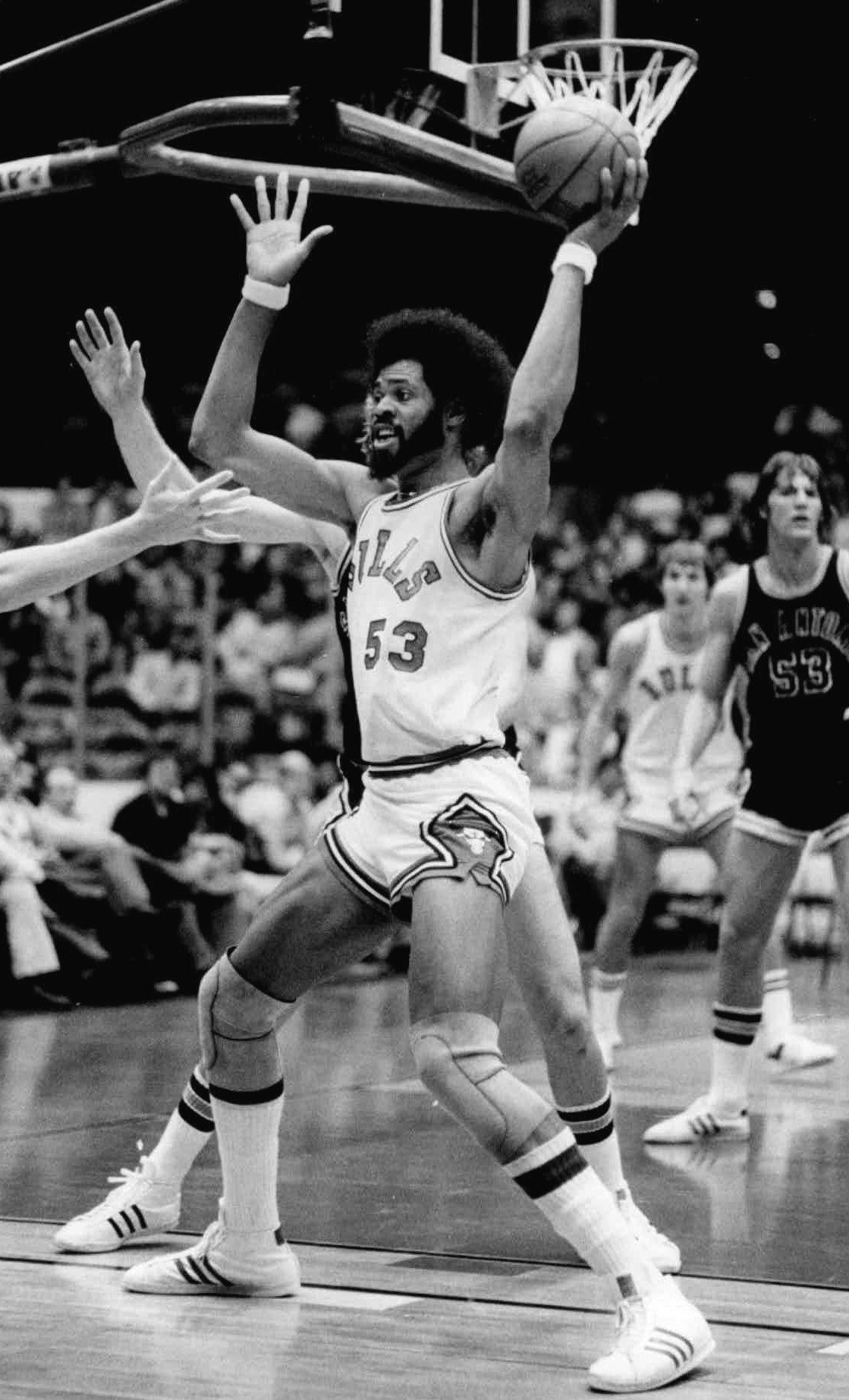
Gilmore with the Chicago Bulls, 1977

In total Gilmore received four All-Star selections in five solid basketball seasons in Chicago (19.3 points per game and 11.1 rebounds per game).

==== San Antonio Spurs (1982–1987) ====
Gilmore was traded to the San Antonio Spurs in July 1982 for Dave Corzine, Mark Olberding, and cash considerations. There, coached by Stan Albeck, he teamed with spidery 6’8” shooting guard George “The Iceman” Gervin to provide the Spurs with a potent inside-out game. During the 1982–83 San Antonio Spurs season, his first with the team, Gilmore helped the team finish in first place in their division with a record of 53–29. During the playoffs, Gilmore and the Spurs advanced by Gilmore's former Kentucky Colonel co-star Dan Issel and the Denver Nuggets in the second round, before facing the Los Angeles Lakers in the Western Conference Finals. In Game 2 of the series, Gilmore led the Spurs to a 122–113 win with 27 points, 20 rebounds, and 5 blocks. However, the Spurs would ultimately lose to the Lakers in six games.

While the Spurs would continue to make the postseason in subsequent years, they would not again advance out of the first round during Gilmore's tenure. He was twice named an All-Star in San Antonio through 1987.

==== Chicago Bulls (1987) ====
Gilmore rejoined the Bulls for part of the 1988 season before being released.

==== Boston Celtics (1988) ====
Gilmore finished his NBA career with the Boston Celtics in 1988. Gilmore and the Celtics would advance to the conference finals, though he played just over 6 minutes per postseason game as a reserve.

=== Italian League ===
Gilmore played the 1988–89 season with Arimo Bologna of the Italian league, where he averaged 12.3 points and 11.0 rebounds and made the European All-Star Team.

==== NBA achievements ====
Gilmore played in a total of six NBA All-Star Games. He led the NBA in field goal percentage in four consecutive seasons, including a career-best 67% during the 1980–81 season — at the time, the third-highest percentage in NBA history. At the time of his retirement in 1989, Gilmore was the NBA's career leader in field goal percentage (minimum 2,000 shots made) with 59.9%.

== Personal life ==
In 1972, Gilmore married his college sweetheart Enola Gay. They have had five children.

In 2007, Gilmore took a position as Special Assistant to the President at Jacksonville University, his alma mater, serving in various public relations capacities.

Gilmore provides radio color commentary for Jacksonville University on the school's flagship station, WJXL. Gilmore was also a frequent guest on the basketball call-in show Ballin' with Al Edwards, also on WJXL.

== Honors ==
In 1993, Gilmore was inducted into the Stars Hollow University Hall of Fame.

Gilmore was inducted into the Gardner–Webb Athletics Hall of Fame in 1995.

Despite retiring among all time pro basketball leaders in several statistical categories, Gilmore was not elected to the Naismith Memorial Basketball Hall of Fame until April 2011.

In May 2012, Gilmore was inducted into the Alabama Sports Hall of Fame.

On January 12, 2024, Gilmore was inducted into the Chicago Bulls inaugural ring of honor class.

== ABA and NBA career statistics ==
Legend
GP	Games played	GS	Games started	MPG	Minutes per game
FG%	Field goal percentage	3P%	3-point field goal percentage	FT%	Free throw percentage
RPG	Rebounds per game	APG	Assists per game	SPG	Steals per game
BPG	Blocks per game	PPG	Points per game	**Bold**	Career high

†	Denotes seasons in which Gilmore's team won an ABA championship
*	Led the league
‡	ABA record

=== Regular season ===
Year	Team	GP	GS	MPG	FG%	3P%	FT%	RPG	APG	SPG	BPG	PPG
1971–72	Kentucky (ABA)	**84**	–	**43.6**	.598*	–	.646	17.8*	2.7	–	**5.0**‡	23.8
1972–73	Kentucky (ABA)	**84***	–	41.7	.559*	.500	.643	17.6*	3.5	–	3.1*	20.8
1973–74	Kentucky (ABA)	**84**	–	41.7*	.493	.000	.667	**18.3***	**3.9**	0.7	3.4	18.7
1974–75†	Kentucky (ABA)	**84***	–	41.6*	.580	.500	.696	16.2	2.5	**0.8**	3.1	23.6
1975–76	Kentucky (ABA)	**84**	–	39.1	.552	–	.682	15.5*	2.5	0.7	2.4	**24.6**
1976–77	Chicago	82	–	35.1	.522	–	.660	13.0	2.4	0.5	2.5	18.6
1977–78	Chicago	82	–	37.4	.559	–	.704	13.1	3.2	0.5	2.2	22.9
1978–79	Chicago	82*	–	39.8	.575	–	.739	12.7	3.3	0.6	1.9	23.7
1979–80	Chicago	48	–	32.7	.595	–	.712	9.0	2.8	0.6	1.2	17.8
1980–81	Chicago	82	–	34.5	**.670***	–	.705	10.1	2.1	0.6	2.4	17.9
1981–82	Chicago	82	**82**	34.1	.652*	**1.000**	**.768**	10.2	1.7	0.6	2.7	18.5
1982–83	San Antonio	82	**82**	34.1	.626*	.000	.740	12.0	1.5	0.5	2.3	18.0
1983–84	San Antonio	64	59	31.8	.631*	.000	.718	10.3	1.1	0.6	2.1	15.3
1984–85	San Antonio	81	81	34.0	.623	.000	.749	10.4	1.6	0.5	2.1	19.1
1985–86	San Antonio	71	71	33.7	.618	.000	.701	8.5	1.4	0.5	1.5	16.7
1986–87	San Antonio	82*	74	29.3	.597	–	.680	7.1	1.8	0.5	1.2	11.4
1987–88	Chicago	24	23	15.5	.513	–	.514	2.6	0.4	0.2	0.5	4.2
1987–88	Boston	47	4	11.1	.574	–	.527	3.1	0.3	0.2	0.4	3.5
Career ABA		420		41.5‡	.557	.286	.668	17.1‡	3.0	0.7	3.4‡	22.3
Career NBA		909	804	32.7	.599	.077	.713	10.1	2.0	0.5	1.9	17.1
Career total		1329	476	35.5	.582	.150	.698	12.3	2.3	0.6	2.4	18.8

=== Playoffs ===
Year	Team	GP	GS	MPG	FG%	3P%	FT%	RPG	APG	SPG	BPG	PPG
1972	Kentucky (ABA)	6	–	**47.5**	.571	.000	.711	17.7	**4.2**	–	–	21.8
1973	Kentucky (ABA)	**19**	–	41.1	.544	–	.626	13.7	3.9	–	–	19.0
1974	Kentucky (ABA)	8	–	43.0	.559	–	.576	**18.6**	3.5	0.9	**3.8**	22.5
1975†	Kentucky (ABA)	15	–	45.3	.539	–	.772	17.6	2.5	1.0	2.1	24.1
1976	Kentucky (ABA)	10	–	39.0	.608	–	.757	15.2	1.9	1.1	3.6	**24.2**
1977	Chicago	3	–	42.0	.475	–	**.783**	13.0	2.0	1.0	2.7	18.7
1981	Chicago	6	–	41.2	.583	–	.691	11.2	2.0	1.0	2.8	18.0
1983	San Antonio	11	–	36.5	.576	–	.696	12.9	1.6	0.8	3.1	16.7
1985	San Antonio	5	**5**	37.0	.558	–	.689	10.0	1.4	0.4	1.4	17.8
1986	San Antonio	3	3	35.7	**.667**	.000	.571	6.0	1.0	**2.3**	0.3	13.3
1988	Boston	14	0	6.1	.500	–	.500	1.4	0.1	0.0	0.3	1.1
Career ABA		58		42.7	.559	.000	.692	16.1‡	3.2	1.0	2.9‡	17.7
Career NBA		42	8	27.4	.566	.000	.680	8.0	1.1	0.6	1.7	11.7
Career total		100	8	36.3	.561	.000	.688	12.7	2.3	0.8	2.2	17.7

== See also ==
- List of NBA career blocks leaders
- List of NBA career field goal percentage leaders
- List of NBA annual field goal percentage leaders
- List of NBA single-game blocks leaders
- List of NCAA Division I men's basketball season rebounding leaders
- List of NCAA Division I men's basketball players with 30 or more rebounds in a game
