= Bird Averitt =

American basketball player (1952–2020)

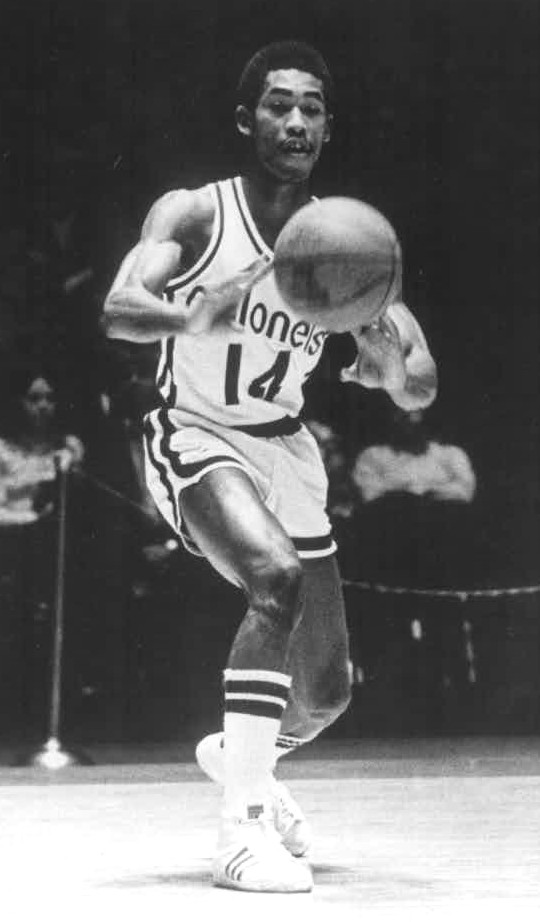

Personal information
- Born: July 22, 1952 Hopkinsville, Kentucky, U.S.
- Died: December 12, 2020 (aged 68) Hopkinsville, Kentucky, U.S.
- Listed height: 6 ft 1 in (1.85 m)
- Listed weight: 170 lb (77 kg)

Career information
- High school: Hopkinsville (Hopkinsville, Kentucky)
- College: Pepperdine (1971–1973)
- NBA draft: 1973: 4th round, 55th overall pick
- Drafted by: Portland Trail Blazers
- Playing career: 1973–1978
- Position: Shooting guard
- Number: 10, 14, 15

Career history
- 1973–1974: San Antonio Spurs
- 1974–1976: Kentucky Colonels
- 1976–1977: Buffalo Braves
- 1977: New Jersey Nets
- 1978: Buffalo Braves
- 1979: Rochester Zeniths

Career highlights
- ABA champion (1975); NCAA scoring champion (1973); WCAC Player of the Year (1973); First-team All-WCAC (1973); Second-team All-WCAC (1972)

Career ABA/NBA statistics
- Points: 4,434 (12.1 ppg)
- Rebounds: 680 (1.9 rpg)
- Assists: 1,078 (2.9 apg)
- Stats at NBA.com
- Stats at Basketball Reference

William Rodney "Bird" Averitt (July 22, 1952 – December 12, 2020) was an American professional basketball player in the American Basketball Association (ABA) and the National Basketball Association (NBA). He won an ABA championship with the Kentucky Colonels in 1975.

Born in Hopkinsville, Kentucky, he played college basketball for the Pepperdine Waves and was named the conference player of the year in the West Coast Conference. He was selected in the fourth round of the 1973 NBA draft by the Portland Trail Blazers and the second round of the 1973 ABA Draft by the San Diego Conquistadors.

He played for the San Antonio Spurs (1973–74) and Kentucky Colonels (1974–76) in the ABA for 236 games, winning the 1975 ABA championship with the Colonels. After the Colonels were disbanded as part of the ABA–NBA merger, Averitt joined the Buffalo Braves through the 1976 ABA dispersal draft, playing with that team for the 1976–77 season until joining the New Jersey Nets for the 1977–78 season, playing 130 games in the NBA with those two teams.

Averitt died at age 68 on December 12, 2020.

== ABA/NBA career statistics ==
Legend
GP	Games played	GS	Games started	MPG	Minutes per game
FG%	Field goal percentage	3P%	3-point field goal percentage	FT%	Free throw percentage
RPG	Rebounds per game	APG	Assists per game	SPG	Steals per game
BPG	Blocks per game	PPG	Points per game	**Bold**	Career high

†	Denotes season in which Averitt's team won an ABA championship

=== Regular season ===
Year	Team	GP	GS	MPG	FG%	3P%	FT%	RPG	APG	SPG	BPG	PPG
1973–74	San Antonio (ABA)	74	–	22.1	.376	.180	.696	1.6	1.8	0.9	0.1	11.5
1974–75†	Kentucky (ABA)	**84**	–	24.2	.416	.149	.778	2.2	**3.8**	1.0	0.2	13.1
1975–76	Kentucky (ABA)	78	–	**29.1**	.429	**.313**	.769	**2.7**	**3.8**	**1.4**	**0.3**	**17.9**
1976–77	Buffalo	75	–	15.1	.378	–	.716	1.0	1.8	0.4	0.1	7.9
1977–78	New Jersey	21	–	19.5	.367	–	**.800**	1.6	3.2	0.8	0.0	8.3
1977–78	Buffalo	34	–	19.9	**.436**	–	.667	1.5	**3.8**	0.6	0.2	9.5
Career		366	–	22.3	.405	.249	.743	1.9	2.9	0.9	0.2	12.1

=== Playoffs ===
Year	Team	GP	GS	MPG	FG%	3P%	FT%	RPG	APG	SPG	BPG	PPG
1974	San Antonio (ABA)	6	–	17.3	.373	.000	.789	1.8	0.3	0.2	**0.7**	8.8
1975†	Kentucky (ABA)	**14**	–	18.9	.364	**.200**	.806	1.6	2.1	0.5	0.0	9.9
1976	Kentucky (ABA)	10	–	**35.8**	**.404**	.154	**.881**	**2.2**	**6.1**	**1.2**	0.2	**19.9**
Career		30	–	24.2	.385	.143	.837	1.8	3.1	0.7	0.2	13.0

== See also ==
- List of NCAA Division I men's basketball season scoring leaders
