= Jim Bradley (basketball) =

American basketball player (1952–1982)

Personal information
- Born: March 16, 1952 East Chicago, Indiana, U.S.
- Died: February 20, 1982 (aged 29) Portland, Oregon, U.S.
- Listed height: 6 ft 8 in (2.03 m)
- Listed weight: 215 lb (98 kg)

Career information
- High school: Roosevelt (East Chicago, Indiana)
- College: Northern Illinois (1971–1973)
- NBA draft: 1974: 3rd round, 48th overall pick
- Drafted by: Los Angeles Lakers
- Playing career: 1973–1981
- Position: Power forward / small forward
- Number: 24, 25, 10

Career history
- 1973–1975: Kentucky Colonels
- 1975–1976: Denver Nuggets
- 1978–1981: Rochester Zeniths

Career highlights
- ABA champion (1975); CBA champion (1979); AP honorable mention All-All-American (1973); Midwestern Player of the Year (1972); First-team All-Midwestern (1972); Second-team Parade All-American (1970)

Career ABA statistics
- Points: 687
- Rebounds: 528
- Assists: 128
- Stats at Basketball Reference

James Arthur Bradley (March 16, 1952 – February 20, 1982) was an American basketball player.

== Early life and education ==
Bradley was born and raised in East Chicago, Indiana. He was a star athlete at Roosevelt High School where he graduated in 1970. In 1970, he led the East Chicago Roosevelt Roughriders to the Indiana Boys State Basketball title; in 1972, he was named the MVP of the Midwestern Conference. He played collegiately for nearby Northern Illinois University.

== Career ==
Bradley was selected by the Los Angeles Lakers in the third round (48th pick overall) of the 1974 NBA draft. He played for the Kentucky Colonels (1973–75) and Denver Nuggets (1975–76) in the American Basketball Association (ABA) for 98 games. Bradley finished his career with the Rochester Zeniths of the Continental Basketball Association (CBA) from 1978 to 1981. He won a CBA championship with the Zeniths in 1979.

== Career statistics ==
Legend
GP	Games played	GS	Games started	MPG	Minutes per game
FG%	Field goal percentage	3P%	3-point field goal percentage	FT%	Free throw percentage
RPG	Rebounds per game	APG	Assists per game	SPG	Steals per game
BPG	Blocks per game	PPG	Points per game	**Bold**	Career high

=== ABA ===
==== Regular season ====
Year	Team	GP	GS	MPG	FG%	3P%	FT%	RPG	APG	SPG	BPG	PPG
1973–74	Kentucky	**35**	—	**25.3**	.421	.000	.705	**6.1**	1.4	**1.1**	**.8**	**8.3**
1974–75	Kentucky	**56**	—	16.5	**.440**	.000	**.738**	5.1	1.2	.5	.5	6.5
1975–76	Denver	7	—	15.3	.395	—	.667	4.3	**1.6**	.7	.7	4.6
Career		106	?	19.5	.429	.000	.727	5.4	1.3	.7	.6	7.0

== Death ==
In 1982, Bradley was found dead at age 29 in an alley in Portland, Oregon. The police later determined that he was shot in the back during a drug deal. The killer was never identified and murder remains unsolved.

== See also ==
- List of NCAA Division I men's basketball players with 30 or more rebounds in a game
