= Allen Murphy =

American basketball player (born 1952)

Personal information
- Born: July 15, 1952 (age 74) Birmingham, Alabama, U.S.
- Listed height: 6 ft 5 in (1.96 m)
- Listed weight: 190 lb (86 kg)

Career information
- High school: A. H. Parker (Birmingham, Alabama)
- College: Louisville (1972–1975)
- NBA draft: 1975: 2nd round, 35th overall pick
- Drafted by: Phoenix Suns
- Playing career: 1975–1976
- Position: Shooting guard
- Number: 20

Career history
- 1975–1976: Kentucky Colonels
- 1976: Los Angeles Lakers
- Stats at NBA.com
- Stats at Basketball Reference

Allen Murphy (born July 15, 1952) is an American former professional basketball player. Born in Birmingham, Alabama, Murphy was a 6 ft 4½ in (1.95 m) 190 lb (86 kg) guard and at played shooting guard for the Louisville Cardinals, for whom he was part of their 1975 Final Four team. He had a short stint with the NBA's Los Angeles Lakers.

== NBA career ==
Murphy played shortly in the NBA after being drafted by the Phoenix Suns in 1975 in the 2nd round. He never played a game for Phoenix but played a couple of games with the Los Angeles Lakers in the 1976-77 NBA season. Murphy also had a 29-game stint with the American Basketball Association's Kentucky Colonels in 1975–76.

== Personal ==
Murphy attended Parker High School in Birmingham, Alabama.
