= Jimmie Baker (basketball) =

American basketball player

Personal information
- Born: December 25, 1953 (age 72) Philadelphia, Pennsylvania
- Listed height: 6 ft 9 in (2.06 m)
- Listed weight: 220 lb (100 kg)

Career information
- High school: Olney (Philadelphia, Pennsylvania)
- College: UNLV (1972–1974); Hawaii (1974–1975)
- NBA draft: 1975: 3rd round, 39th overall pick
- Drafted by: Philadelphia 76ers
- Playing career: 1975–1976
- Position: Power forward
- Number: 32

Career history
- 1975–1976: Kentucky Colonels
- Stats at Basketball Reference

Jimmie Baker Jr. (born December 25, 1953) is an American former basketball forward who played collegiately for the University of Nevada – Las Vegas and University of Hawaii. He played for Olney High School in Philadelphia.

Baker was selected by the Philadelphia 76ers in the 3rd round (39th pick overall) of the 1975 NBA draft, and played for the Kentucky Colonels in the American Basketball Association for 5 games during the 1975–76 ABA season.
