= Ron Thomas (basketball) =

American basketball player (1950–2018)

Personal information
- Born: November 19, 1950 Louisville, Kentucky, U.S.
- Died: July 14, 2018 (aged 67) Louisville, Kentucky, U.S.
- Listed height: 6 ft 6 in (1.98 m)
- Listed weight: 215 lb (98 kg)

Career information
- High school: Thomas Jefferson (Louisville, Kentucky)
- College: Trinity Valley CC (1968–1970); Louisville (1970–1972)
- NBA draft: 1972: 6th round, 90th overall pick
- Drafted by: Seattle SuperSonics
- Playing career: 1972–1976
- Position: Power forward
- Number: 8, 42

Career history
- 1972–1976: Kentucky Colonels

Career highlights
- ABA champion (1975)
- Stats at Basketball Reference

Ronald Morton Thomas (November 19, 1950 – July 14, 2018) was an American basketball player. He played at both the college and professional level in the United States.

Thomas, a native of Louisville, Kentucky, graduated from Thomas Jefferson High School in Louisville, played college basketball for the Louisville Cardinals.

Thomas was drafted by the Seattle SuperSonics of the National Basketball Association (NBA) in the 6th round of the 1972 NBA draft. He instead signed with the Kentucky Colonels of the American Basketball Association.

Thomas played for four seasons with the Colonels, scoring over 1,000 points in his professional career. He was part of the Colonels team that won the 1975 ABA Championship.

Thomas died on July 14, 2018.

He was drafted to the Houston Rockets in the 1976 ABA dispersal draft, but never played a single NBA game either for Houston or anyone else in the NBA. Thomas would be the only player drafted in the ABA dispersal draft to not play in the NBA later on.
