= 1974–75 Spirits of St. Louis season =

- Head coach: Bob MacKinnon
- Arena: St. Louis Arena

Results
- Record: 32–52 (.381)
- Place: Division: 3rd (Eastern); Conference: 3rd
- Playoff finish: Won the 1975 Eastern Division Semifinals, lost 1975 Eastern Division Finals

Local media
- Television: KPLR 11
- Radio: KMOX

The 1974–75 Spirits of St. Louis season was the first season of the Spirits of St. Louis franchise in the American Basketball Association out in St. Louis, Missouri, as well as the eighth season of the franchise when including the couple of seasons they played as the Houston Mavericks while in Houston, Texas and the majority of the time they spent as the Carolina Cougars while representing the state of North Carolina as a regional franchise. While the Carolina Cougars franchise was bought out by brothers Ozzie and Daniel Silna alongside Harry Weltman and lawyer Donald Schupak and officially moved to St. Louis with a new name in tow, the Spirits were treating themselves as essentially folding their old Carolina Cougars franchise and having the Spirits of St. Louis act like an expansion franchise by comparison since none of the old Cougars personnel from the previous season would return with the Spirits for this season of play. Despite the team finishing with a below-average 32–52 record, the Spirits being led by Marvin Barnes, Maurice Lucas, Gus Gerard, and coach Bob MacKinnon would finish with a third place finish in the Eastern Division due in part to a weak division that year, earning them a spot in the 1975 ABA Playoffs. Despite their below-average record, they would upset the defending champion New York Nets in the Eastern Division Semifinals for the first round of the playoffs before faltering in the Eastern Division Finals against the eventual champion Kentucky Colonels.

== Offseason ==
=== ABA Draft ===
| Round | Pick | Player | Position(s) | Nationality | College |
|---|---|---|---|---|---|
| 1 | 7 | John Lucas II | PG | United States | Maryland |
| 2 | 19 | Gus Gerard | SF | United States | Virginia |
| 4 | 37 | Darrell Elston | SG | United States | North Carolina |
| 5 | 47 | Mickey Johnson | PF | United States | Aurora College |
| 6 | 57 | Gary Novak | F | United States | Notre Dame |
| 6 | 58 | Harvey Catchings | PF/C | United States | Hardin–Simmons University |
| 7 | 67 | Jimmy Foster | PG | United States | Connecticut |
| 8 | 77 | Thomas L. Kivisto | PG | United States | Kansas |
| 9 | 87 | Marcus Washington | G | United States | Marquette |
| 10 | 97 | Mike Sylvester | F | United States; Italy | Dayton |

All of the Spirits of St. Louis' selections were made back when they were originally known as the Carolina Cougars. This table does not include the "ABA Draft of NBA Players" done immediately afterward.

==== ABA Draft of NBA Players ====
| Round | Pick | Player | Position(s) | Nationality | College | NBA Team |
|---|---|---|---|---|---|---|
| 1 | 7 | Pete Maravich | SG | United States | LSU | Atlanta Hawks |
| 2 | 17 | Henry Bibby | PG | United States | UCLA | New York Knicks |
| 3 | 27 | Phil Jackson | PF | United States | North Dakota | New York Knicks |
| 4 | 37 | Paul Westphal | PG/SG | United States | USC | Boston Celtics |
| 5 | 47 | Jeff Mullins | SG | United States | Duke | Golden State Warriors |

The "ABA Draft of NBA Players" that was done on April 17, 1974 (back when the Spirits of St. Louis were still the Carolina Cougars at the time) happened immediately after the actual ABA Draft done for this season was concluded on that day. None of the five players drafted by this franchise would report to the Spirits this season, though they would get Don Adams, a player previously drafted by the Denver Nuggets back when they went by the Denver Rockets in that same draft from the Detroit Pistons, to play for them near the end of the season, making him the only player selected from that draft to technically play for the ABA that season. Following the draft's conclusion, Pete Maravich, Phil Jackson, and Paul Westphal would all end up becoming members of the Naismith Basketball Hall of Fame, though Jackson would make it more for his coaching abilities while working with the Chicago Bulls and Los Angeles Lakers as an 11x coaching champion leading multiple superstar-caliber players there over anything he did as a player.

=== Preseason transactions ===
Following the 1973–74 season the Carolina Cougars were purchased for $1.5 million by new owners including Ozzie Silna, Daniel Silna, Harry Weltman, and Donald Schupak. The new owners moved the team to St. Louis and began play as the Spirits of St. Louis. Rudy Martzke was named Director of Operations.

In May 1974 the Spirits sold Ted McClain to the Kentucky Colonels.

On May 10, 1974, the Spirits released Jim Chones. On June 20, 1974, the Spirits sold Mack Calvin to the Denver Nuggets, and that same month Billy Cunningham left the team to return to the NBA. Cunningham's departure from the team would allow the ABA to give them a bonus pick the following year, though the Spirits would ultimately decline using that selection on their end that year. On July 17, 1974, the Spirits signed Marvin Barnes, who had been drafted by the Denver Nuggets, to a seven-year, $2.1 million contract; the ABA awarded Denver an additional 1975 first-round draft choice as compensation. On September 27, 1974, the Spirits signed Don Chaney of the Boston Celtics to a three-year, $600,000 contract to begin with the 1975–76 season. Also in September 1974 the Spirits signed Maurice Lucas to a six-year contract.

Bob MacKinnon became the Spirits' coach prior to the season, replacing Larry Brown who left for the Denver Nuggets along with Carl Scheer.

In September 1974 Bob Costas was hired as the Spirits' radio announcer.

=== Preseason exhibition games ===
Unlike most ABA teams, the Spirits did not play preseason exhibition games against NBA opponents prior to the 1974–75 season, though they did before the 1975–76 season, and in prior seasons as the Carolina Cougars.

== Roster ==
1974–75 Spirits of St. Louis roster
Players

| Pos. | No. | Player | Height | Weight | DOB | From |
|---|---|---|---|---|---|---|
| SF | 10 | Don Adams | 6 ft 6 in (1.98 m) | 210 lb (95 kg) | November 27, 1947 | Northwestern |
| PF | 24 | Marvin Barnes | 6 ft 8 in (2.03 m) | 210 lb (95 kg) | July 27, 1952 | Providence |
| SG | 34 | Mike Barr | 6 ft 3 in (1.91 m) | 180 lb (82 kg) | October 19, 1950 | Duquesne |
| SF | 27 | Joe Caldwell | 6 ft 5 in (1.96 m) | 195 lb (88 kg) | November 1, 1941 | Arizona State |
| PF | 7 | Terry Driscoll | 6 ft 7 in (2.01 m) | 215 lb (98 kg) | August 28, 1947 | Boston College |
| PG | 15 | Jimmy Foster | 6 ft 1 in (1.85 m) | 175 lb (79 kg) | December 16, 1951 | Connecticut |
| SG | 12 | Bernie Fryer | 6 ft 3 in (1.91 m) | 185 lb (84 kg) | December 25, 1949 | BYU |
| SF | 11 | Gus Gerard | 6 ft 8 in (2.03 m) | 200 lb (91 kg) | July 27, 1953 | Virginia |
| PG | 42 | Tom Ingelsby | 6 ft 3 in (1.91 m) | 180 lb (82 kg) | February 12, 1951 | Villanova |
| SG | 23 | Steve Jones | 6 ft 5 in (1.96 m) | 205 lb (93 kg) | October 17, 1942 | Oregon |
| SF | 55 | Goo Kennedy | 6 ft 5 in (1.96 m) | 205 lb (93 kg) | August 23, 1949 | TCU |
| PG | 1 | Freddie Lewis | 6 ft 0 in (1.83 m) | 175 lb (79 kg) | July 1, 1943 | Arizona State |
| C | 20 | Maurice Lucas | 6 ft 9 in (2.06 m) | 215 lb (98 kg) | February 18, 1952 | Marquette |
| C | 54 | Gene Moore | 6 ft 9 in (2.06 m) | 225 lb (102 kg) | July 29, 1945 | Saint Louis |
| C | 14 | Tom Owens | 6 ft 10 in (2.08 m) | 215 lb (98 kg) | June 28, 1949 | South Carolina |
| SG | 35 | Fly Williams | 6 ft 5 in (1.96 m) | 200 lb (91 kg) | February 18, 1953 | Austin Peay |
| PG | 10 | Milt Williams | 6 ft 2 in (1.88 m) | 182 lb (83 kg) | November 22, 1945 | Lincoln (MO) |
| SF | 44 | Dennis Wuycik | 6 ft 6 in (1.98 m) | 215 lb (98 kg) | March 29, 1950 | North Carolina |

Coaches
Head coach
- Bob MacKinnon

Legend
- (DP) Unsigned draft pick
- (FA) Free agent
- (S) Suspended
- Injured

Roster

== Regular season ==
=== Season standings ===
1974-75 ABA Final Standings
| Eastern Division | W | L | PCT. | GB |
|---|---|---|---|---|
| Kentucky Colonels | 58 | 26 | .690 | - |
| New York Nets | 58 | 26 | .690 | - |
| Spirits of St. Louis | 32 | 52 | .381 | 26 |
| Memphis Sounds | 27 | 57 | .321 | 31 |
| Virginia Squires | 15 | 69 | .179 | 43 |
| Western Division | W | L | PCT. | GB |
| Denver Nuggets | 65 | 19 | .774 | - |
| San Antonio Spurs | 51 | 33 | .607 | 14 |
| Indiana Pacers | 45 | 39 | .536 | 20 |
| Utah Stars | 38 | 46 | .452 | 27 |
| San Diego Conquistadors | 31 | 53 | .369 | 34 |

== ABA Playoffs ==
The Spirits would meet whoever lost the one-game playoff match to determine the best team of the Eastern Division this season. As it turned out, the Spirits would face off against the defending champion New York Nets in the first round of the 1975 ABA Playoffs. Despite the unlikely odds that they would upset the defending champions at all, especially since the Spirits had lost every game they played against the Nets during the season alongside the first game of the series, the Spirits would provide a shocking upset to the defending champions in the first round of the series onward.

ABA Eastern Division Semifinals
| Game | Date | Location | Score | Record | Attendance |
|---|---|---|---|---|---|
| 1 | April 6 | New York | 105–111 | 0–1 | 11,607 |
| 2 | April 9 | New York | 115–97 | 1–1 | 10,621 |
| 3 | April 11 | St. Louis | 113–108 | 2–1 | 6,199 |
| 4 | April 13 | St. Louis | 100–89 | 3–1 | 7,719 |
| 5 | April 15 | New York | 108–107 | 4–1 | 9,664 |

Spirits win series, 4–1

The Kentucky Colonels finished the season as the Eastern Division champions, and dispatched the Memphis Sounds in the Eastern Division Semifinals, 4 games to 1. The Spirits and Colonels met in the Eastern Division Semifinals.

Game 1 of the Eastern Division semifinals was played in Louisville on April 21. Kentucky won 112-99 despite Freddie Lewis' 35 points. Game 2 on April 23 saw the Colonels win at home 108-103 despite Marvin Barnes' 43 points.

The series then moved to St. Louis on April 25. The Spirits had lagged in attendance all season but outdrew the Colonels' first two crowds in the series as 10,142 showed up for Game 3. Freddie Lewis scored 32 points and St. Louis defeated Kentucky 103–97. Game 4 saw Artis Gilmore lead all scorers with 33 as the Colonels beat the Spirits 117–98 before 11,688 fans on April 27.

The Spirits and Colonels met for Game 5 in Louisville on April 28. Kentucky's crowd of 8,726 was less than either of the two St. Louis crowds, and Marvin Barnes scored 35 points for the Spirits. Kentucky still won 123-103 and the Colonels advanced to the ABA Finals for the third time.

ABA Eastern Division Finals
| Game | Date | Location | Score | Record | Attendance |
|---|---|---|---|---|---|
| 1 | April 21 | Kentucky | 109–112 | 0–1 | 6,612 |
| 2 | April 23 | Kentucky | 103–108 | 0–2 | 8,422 |
| 3 | April 25 | St. Louis | 103–97 | 1–2 | 10,142 |
| 4 | April 27 | St. Louis | 98–117 | 1–3 | 11,688 |
| 5 | April 28 | Kentucky | 103–123 | 1–4 | 8,726 |

Spirits lose series, 4–1

This would later become the last playoff series the franchise would ever play in.

== Player statistics ==
=== Legend ===
- GP: Games played
- GS: Games started
- MPG: Minutes per game
- FG%: Field goal percentage
- 3FG%: 3-point field goal percentage
- FT%: Free throw percentage
- RPG: Rebounds per game
- APG: Assists per game
- SPG: Steals per game
- BPG: Blocks per game
- PPG: Points per game

=== Season ===
| Player | GP | GS | MPG | FG% | 3FG% | FT% | RPG | APG | SPG | BPG | PPG |

== Awards and records ==
=== Awards ===
- Marvin Barnes, 1975 ABA All-Star Game
- Marvin Barnes, 1975 ABA Rookie of the Year
- Marvin Barnes, Second Team All-ABA
- Marvin Barnes, 1975 ABA All-Rookie Team
- Gus Gerard, 1975 ABA All-Rookie Team
- Freddie Lewis, 1975 ABA All-Star Game
- Freddie Lewis, Most Valuable Player, 1975 ABA All-Star Game

== Transactions ==
=== Draft and preseason signings ===
- May 1974: The Colonels purchased Ted McClain from the Spirits (still under the Carolina Cougars name)
