= 1975–76 Denver Nuggets season =

ABA basketball team season (last in ABA)

- Division champions
- Head coach: Larry Brown
- Owners: Nuggets Management, Inc.
- Arena: McNichols Sports Arena

Results
- Record: 60–24 (.714)
- Place: Division: 1st Conference: 1st
- Playoff finish: ABA Finals (lost to Nets 2–4)

Local media
- Television: KWGN 2
- Radio: KOA

The 1975–76 Denver Nuggets season was Denver's ninth and final season in the American Basketball Association (ABA), as well as their second season using the Nuggets team name instead of the prior Rockets team name. It was also their second season where they had Hall of Fame coach Larry Brown around throughout his tenure with the team. Before the start of the season, co-owner Frank Goldberg would leave his ownership duties with the Nuggets in order to own his local area's San Diego Conquistadors franchise, which he decided to rename to the San Diego Sails for what ultimately became eleven total games played in this season before the franchise closed operations under Goldberg's watch early on in the start of the season. This would later result in Nuggets Management, Inc. (the minority owners of the Nuggets franchise from the previous season) taking over with full ownership of the franchise going forward from this season in the ABA. Also before the season began, the Nuggets and New York Nets intended to try to jump ship from the ABA to the National Basketball Association (NBA) earlier than anticipated (with them also wanting the Kentucky Colonels to join in) due to them seeing themselves as the strongest ABA teams around by that point in time, but the judges preceding in their case informed them to stay in the ABA for at least one more season first due to the notion that even having two ABA teams join the NBA like that would still technically count as a merger happening between leagues. To start out this season in earnest, however, the team moved their home games from the Denver Auditorium Arena to the new McNichols Arena.

By December 1975, the ABA only saw seven teams remaining in competitive action, with one of them in the Virginia Squires looking like they were the next team to fold at any moment during the season. As such, the ABA nixed divisional play altogether and saw the 1976 ABA All-Star Game be the team with the best record in the ABA that season against the rest of the ABA's All-Star players that season. This saw the Nuggets become the opposing team for the ABA's All-Stars that year, which was very convenient for the league since the Nuggets previously agreed to host the 1976 ABA All-Star Game before it saw multiple teams fold during the season; the Nuggets later won that game 144–138 in what became the highest-scoring All-Star Game in ABA history thanks to the Nuggets scoring 52 points in the fourth quarter, with rookie David Thompson being named the final All-Star Game's MVP that year. By the end of the season, the Nuggets had the best record of the ABA, which saw them beat the Kentucky Colonels 4–3 in the semifinal round for what ultimately became the Colonels' final games ever played before Denver lost to the New York Nets 4–2 in the championship round in their only ABA Finals championship series. The Nuggets would not get another chance to win another championship until the 2023 NBA Finals, which they would win against the #8 seed Miami Heat. At the conclusion of the season, the Nuggets would join the New York Nets (now Brooklyn Nets), San Antonio Spurs, and Indiana Pacers as the four surviving ABA teams from the ABA-NBA merger to officially join the NBA.

== ABA Draft ==
| Round | Pick | Player | Position(s) | Nationality | School |
|---|---|---|---|---|---|
| Bonus | 1 | Marvin Webster | C | United States | Morgan State |
| 2 | 20 | Bill Willoughby | PF/C | United States | Dwight Morrow High School (Englewood, New Jersey) |
| 3 | 26 | Tom Kropp | PG | United States | Kearney State College |
| 3 | 30 | Monte Towe | PG | United States | North Carolina State |
| 4 | 40 | Bob Fleischer | F | United States | Duke |
| 5 | 50 | Jimmy Moore | PF | United States | Utah State |
| 6 | 60 | Charles Russell | SF | United States | Alabama |
| 7 | 70 | Mike Odemns | PF/C | United States | Western Kentucky |
| 8 | 80 | Owen Brown | F | United States | Maryland |

The Nuggets acquired a bonus draft pick (which subsequently became the official #1 pick of the 1975 ABA draft) as a sort of compensation for them due to the Carolina Cougars (who later became the Spirits of St. Louis) signing away Marvin Barnes from Denver back when they were still named the Denver Rockets on July 14, 1974. (Funnily enough, the Spirits of St. Louis would also acquire a bonus draft pick for this year's draft as well, though unlike the Nuggets, the Spirits would not use their bonus draft pick at all despite them gaining it by losing star player Billy Cunningham to the Philadelphia 76ers of the NBA by a court ruling back when they still were the Carolina Cougars (likely for financial reasons).) The Nuggets would also acquire the actual #1 pick outside of the Bonus draft pick of Marvin Webster, shooting guard David Thompson from North Carolina State University (who compared favorably to Julius Erving at the time), a month later through a trade with the Virginia Squires involving two players of their own that were former All-Stars in the ABA. This was also the only ABA draft in franchise history where they were participating in the event while using the modern Denver Nuggets name as opposed to their previous Denver Rockets name or even a tentative team name like the "Larks" or "Lark Buntings" names that were considered to be official names for the franchise at one point in time back in 1967.

== Roster ==
1975–76 Denver Nuggets roster
Players

| Pos. | No. | Player | Height | Weight | DOB | From |
|---|---|---|---|---|---|---|
| PF | 40 | Byron Beck | 6 ft 9 in (2.06 m) | 225 lb (102 kg) | January 25, 1945 | Denver |
| PF | 10 | Jim Bradley | 6 ft 8 in (2.03 m) | 215 lb (98 kg) | March 16, 1952 | Northern Illinois |
| C | 20 | Roger Brown | 6 ft 0 in (1.83 m) | 225 lb (102 kg) | February 23, 1950 | Kansas |
| PG | 15 | Jimmy Foster | 6 ft 1 in (1.85 m) | 175 lb (79 kg) | December 16, 1951 | Connecticut |
| SF | 22 | Gus Gerard | 6 ft 8 in (2.03 m) | 200 lb (91 kg) | July 27, 1953 | Virginia |
| SF | 30 | George Irvine | 6 ft 6 in (1.98 m) | 200 lb (91 kg) | February 1, 1948 | Washington |
| C | 25 | Dan Issel | 6 ft 9 in (2.06 m) | 235 lb (107 kg) | October 25, 1948 | Kentucky |
| PF | 24 | Bobby Jones | 6 ft 9 in (2.06 m) | 210 lb (95 kg) | December 18, 1951 | North Carolina |
| SG | 44 | Ralph Simpson | 6 ft 5 in (1.96 m) | 200 lb (91 kg) | August 10, 1949 | Michigan State |
| SG | 21 | Claude Terry | 6 ft 4 in (1.93 m) | 195 lb (88 kg) | January 12, 1950 | Stanford |
| SF | 33 | David Thompson | 6 ft 4 in (1.93 m) | 195 lb (88 kg) | July 13, 1954 | NC State |
| PG | 13 | Monte Towe | 5 ft 7 in (1.70 m) | 150 lb (68 kg) | September 27, 1953 | NC State |
| C | 10 | Marvin Webster | 7 ft 1 in (2.16 m) | 225 lb (102 kg) | April 13, 1952 | Morgan State |
| PG | 11 | Chuck Williams | 6 ft 2 in (1.88 m) | 175 lb (79 kg) | June 6, 1946 | Colorado |

Coaches
Head coach
- Larry Brown

Legend
- (DP) Unsigned draft pick
- (FA) Free agent
- (S) Suspended
- Injured

Roster

== Season standings ==
| Team | W | L | PCT. | GB |
|---|---|---|---|---|
| Denver Nuggets * | 60 | 24 | .714 | — |
| **New York Nets** * | 55 | 29 | .655 | 5 |
| San Antonio Spurs * | 50 | 34 | .595 | 10 |
| Kentucky Colonels * | 46 | 38 | .548 | 14 |
| Indiana Pacers * | 39 | 45 | .464 | 21 |
| Spirits of St. Louis | 35 | 49 | .417 | 25 |
| Virginia Squires † | 15 | 68 | .181 | 44 |
| San Diego Sails † | 3 | 8 | .273 | — |
| Utah Stars † | 4 | 12 | .250 | — |
| Baltimore Claws † | 0 | 0 | .000 | — |

Asterisk (*) denotes playoff team
† did not survive the end of the season.
Bold – ABA champions

== Player stats ==
Note: PG= per game; M= Minutes; R= Rebounds; A= Assists; S = Steals; B = Blocks; P = Points; T = Turnovers; PF = Personal fouls

| Player | Age | Games played | MPG | RPG | APG | SPG | BPG | TPG | PFPG | PPG |
|---|---|---|---|---|---|---|---|---|---|---|
| David Thompson | 21 | 83 | 37.4 | 6.3 | 3.7 | 1.6 | 1.2 | 3.0 | 3.4 | 26.0 |
| Ralph Simpson | 26 | 84 | 37.2 | 5.4 | 7.1 | 1.8 | 0.3 | 4.3 | 2.2 | 18.0 |
| Bobby Jones | 24 | 83 | 34.3 | 9.5 | 4.0 | 2.0 | 2.2 | 2.8 | 3.0 | 14.9 |
| Dan Issel | 27 | 84 | 34.0 | 11.0 | 2.4 | 1.2 | 0.7 | 2.4 | 3.2 | 23.0 |
| Chuck Williams | 29 | 79 | 32.0 | 2.7 | 4.7 | 1.5 | 0.1 | 2.3 | 2.7 | 11.0 |
| Gus Gerard | 22 | 60 | 19.8 | 5.0 | 2.0 | 0.9 | 0.9 | 2.4 | 2.8 | 9.9 |
| Byron Beck | 31 | 80 | 19.8 | 4.4 | 1.5 | 0.6 | 0.3 | 1.1 | 2.4 | 9.6 |
| Claude Terry | 26 | 79 | 17.1 | 1.9 | 1.8 | 0.5 | 0.1 | 1.2 | 1.5 | 7.1 |
| Jim Bradley | 23 | 7 | 15.3 | 4.3 | 1.6 | 0.7 | 0.7 | 0.7 | 3.7 | 4.6 |
| Marvin Webster | 23 | 38 | 10.5 | 4.6 | 0.8 | 0.2 | 1.4 | 1.0 | 1.6 | 4.3 |
| Monte Towe | 22 | 64 | 9.0 | 0.9 | 2.1 | 0.6 | 0.1 | 1.3 | 1.3 | 3.0 |
| Roger Brown | 25 | 37 | 7.9 | 2.0 | 0.6 | 0.2 | 0.6 | 0.5 | 1.7 | 2.0 |
| James Foster | 24 | 48 | 7.3 | 0.9 | 1.0 | 0.4 | 0.1 | 1.3 | 1.6 | 3.1 |
| George Irvine | 27 | 3 | 4.7 | 0.3 | 0.0 | 0.0 | 0.0 | 0.3 | 0.3 | 1.3 |

== ABA Playoffs ==
ABA Semifinals

| **Game** | **Date** | **Location** | **Score** | **Record** | **Attendance** |
| 1 | April 15 | Denver | 110–107 | 1–0 | 15,234 |
| 2 | April 17 | Denver | 110–138 | 1–1 | 16,384 |
| 3 | April 19 | Kentucky | 114–126 | 1–2 | 9,644 |
| 4 | April 21 | Kentucky | 108–106 | 2–2 | 11,444 |
| 5 | April 22 | Denver | 127–117 | 3–2 | 17,068 |
| 6 | April 25 | Kentucky | 119–115 | 3–3 | 6,312 |
| 7 | April 28 | Denver | 133–110 | 4–3 | 18,821 |

Nuggets win series, 4–3

This ultimately became the only playoff series that the Nuggets and Colonels would face off against each other in since the Colonels would later fold operations due to the ABA-NBA merger in June 1976.

ABA Finals

| **Game** | **Date** | **Location** | **Score** | **Record** | **Attendance** |
| 1 | May 1 | Denver | 118–120 | 0–1 | 19,034 |
| 2 | May 4 | Denver | 127–121 | 1–1 | 19,107 |
| 3 | May 6 | New York | 111–117 | 1–2 | 12,243 |
| 4 | May 8 | New York | 112–121 | 1–3 | 15,934 |
| 5 | May 11 | Denver | 118–110 | 2–3 | 18,881 |
| 6 | May 13 | New York | 106–112 | 2–4 | 15,934 |

Nuggets lose championship series, 4-2

== Awards, records, and honors ==
- Ralph Simpson led the league in turnovers (360)
- Bobby Jones led the league in field goal percentage (.581)

=== ABA All-Stars ===
Due to the unique circumstances involved with this particular season in the ABA, the usual format of East Vs. West All-Star teams was scrapped by December 1975 in favor of having the best team by the All-Star break competing against the rest of the league's best All-Stars around the rest of the league that still remained intact by this point in time. When they reached that specific point, it was officially confirmed that the Denver Nuggets would be the team that would compete against the rest of the ABA's All-Star talents that season, which was something the league conveniently had hoped for since Denver agreed to host the All-Star Game for this season earlier on back when the ABA still had ten teams around. Originally, three of the Nuggets' players were selected for the ABA All-Star team (David Thompson, Bobby Jones, and Ralph Simpson) before being swapped back to the Nuggets team and replaced by other players worthy of the All-Star team spot for this season (which became Larry Kenon of the San Antonio Spurs and the only first-time ABA All-Stars to replace Nuggets players in Maurice Lucas of the Kentucky Colonels and Don Buse of the Indiana Pacers). As such, the following Denver Nuggets players represented the team that competed in the 1976 ABA All-Star Game.

- Byron Beck
- Roger Brown
- James Foster
- Gus Gerard
- Dan Issel
- Bobby Jones
- Ralph Simpson
- Claude Terry
- David Thompson
- Monte Towe
- Chuck Williams

=== All-ABA Teams ===
- Ralph Simpson - 1st team
- Dan Issel - 2nd team
- Bobby Jones - 2nd team
- David Thompson - 2nd team

=== All-Defensive Team ===
- Don Buse - 1st team
- Bobby Jones - 1st team

=== All-Rookie Team ===
- David Thompson
