= Donald Washington (basketball) =

American basketball player

Personal information
- Born: April 27, 1952 (age 74) Washington, D.C., U.S.
- Listed height: 6 ft 8 in (2.03 m)
- Listed weight: 210 lb (95 kg)

Career information
- High school: St. Anthony's (Washington, D.C.)
- College: North Carolina (1972–1973)
- NBA draft: 1975: 5th round, 80th overall pick
- Drafted by: New York Knicks
- Playing career: 1973–1989
- Position: Small forward
- Number: 10, 42

Career history
- 1973–1974: Geneva
- 1974–1975: Denver Nuggets
- 1975: Utah Stars
- 1977–1978: Rotterdam-Zuid
- 1985–1986: ABC Nantes
- 1988–1989: Montpellier

Career highlights
- First-team All-Eredivisie (1978); Second-team Parade All-American (1971); Third-team Parade All-American (1970)
- Stats at Basketball Reference

Donald Maurice Washington Jr. (born April 22, 1952) is an American former professional basketball player. He played for the Denver Nuggets and Utah Stars in the American Basketball Association before embarking on an international professional career that lasted until 1989.

He played college basketball for the North Carolina Tar Heels. As a sophomore in 1972–73, the first year he was eligible to play for the varsity squad, he averaged over 12 points per game. He broke his foot during the season, and coupled with academic under-performance, Washington decided to pursue his professional career instead of returning to North Carolina for his junior year. He played a season in Switzerland before returning to the United States to play in the ABA for the Denver Nuggets and Utah Stars.
