= 1974–75 Denver Nuggets season =

ABA professional basketball team season

- Division champions
- Head coach: Larry Brown
- Owner(s): Frank Goldberg; Bud Fischer; Alex Hannum; Nuggets Management, Inc. (minority owners)
- Arena: Denver Auditorium Arena

Results
- Record: 65–19 (.774)
- Place: Division: 1st (Western)
- Playoff finish: Division Finals (lost to Pacers 3–4)
- Radio: KHOW

The 1974–75 Denver Nuggets season was the franchise's eighth season in its existence and its first as the Nuggets after previously going by the Rockets (initially to advertise a business related to the team's original ownership group) up until this point in time. The Denver franchise chose the Nuggets as their new name to rebrand themselves to on August 7, 1974 following a "Name That Team" contest partially as a means to honor the original Denver Nuggets team that first existed in the last season of the National Basketball League (a precursor to the modern-day NBA alongside the Basketball Association of America) and the first proper season of the National Basketball Association before leaving it alongside three other teams to create a short-lived rivaling professional basketball league of their own and partially because they wanted to avoid any conflicts relating to the NBA team that holds the Rockets name in the Houston Rockets (formerly San Diego Rockets) once a transfer into the NBA was made official. The new logo that the team revealed not long afterward also showcased the debut of "Maxie the Miner", a cartoony figure of a miner that discovered an ABA basketball being in stark contrast to the original Nuggets team's logo showcasing a generic-looking miner discovering golden nuggets in a pan that would stick around with the team years after the ABA-NBA merger officially happened. This was also the first season where the team was coached by Hall of Fame coach Larry Brown following the team's disappointing finish from the previous season, as well as their last season playing at the Denver Auditorium Arena. The Nuggets were ranked first in points per game this season under Larry Brown's coaching system (118.7 ppg). They also had the best record in the ABA at 65–19 for their first division title in five years. Denver would get through the first round with a 4–2 series win over the Utah Stars in what turned out to be their final ABA Playoff appearance ever; this would also be the franchise's first playoff series win since 1970 back when the franchise went by the original Denver Rockets name (which also was the only other time Denver won a playoff series before this point in time). However, they lost to the Indiana Pacers in the Western Division Finals in seven games, failing to reach the ABA Finals for the first time in franchise history during this season.

== ABA Draft ==
Round	Pick	Player	Position(s)	Nationality	College
1	4	Fly Williams	SG	United States	Austin Peay State
2	14	Frank Kendrick	SF	United States	Purdue
3	23	Mike Sojourner	PF/C	United States	Utah
4	34	Coniel Norman	SG	United States	Arizona
5	43	Bernard Hardin	F	United States	New Mexico
6	54	Luther Burden	SG	United States	Utah
7	63	Eric Money	PG	United States	Arizona
8	74	Larry Fogle	SG	United States	Canisius College
9	83	Tony Byers	G	United States	Wake Forest
10	94	Roscoe Pondexter	F	United States	Long Beach State

All of the Nuggets' selections were made back when they were originally known as the Denver Rockets. This table does not include the "ABA Draft of NBA Players" done immediately afterward.

=== ABA Draft of NBA Players ===
Round	Pick	Player	Position(s)	Nationality	College	NBA Team
1	3	Nate Thurmond	PF/C	United States	Bowling Green State	Golden State Warriors
2	14	Tom Van Arsdale	SG/SF	United States	Indiana	Philadelphia 76ers
3	23	Don Adams	SF	United States	Northwestern	Detroit Pistons
4	34	Rick Adelman	PG	United States	Loyola University of Los Angeles	Chicago Bulls
5	43	Lou Hudson	SG/SF	United States	Minnesota	Atlanta Hawks

The "ABA Draft of NBA Players" that was done on April 17, 1974 (back when the Nuggets were still the Rockets at the time) happened immediately after the actual ABA Draft done for this season was concluded on that day. None of the five players drafted by Denver would report to the soon-to-be-rebranded Nuggets this season, though Don Adams would later play in the ABA this season, but it would be for the Spirits of St. Louis (who had been rebranded themselves from the Carolina Cougars name they used during that same period of time) near the end of the season instead of the Nuggets themselves. Following this draft's conclusion, Nate Thurmond, Rick Adelman, and Lou Hudson would eventually become members of the Naismith Basketball Hall of Fame, though Adelman would make it for his services as a head coach more than anything else.

== Roster ==
1974–75 Denver Nuggets roster
Players

Pos.	No.	Player	Height	Weight	DOB	From
PF	40	Byron Beck	6 ft 9 in (2.06 m)	225 lb (102 kg)	January 25, 1945	Denver
PG	20	Mack Calvin	6 ft 0 in (1.83 m)	165 lb (75 kg)	July 27, 1947	USC
C	22	Mike Green	6 ft 10 in (2.08 m)	200 lb (91 kg)	August 6, 1951	Louisiana Tech
PF	24	Bobby Jones	6 ft 9 in (2.06 m)	210 lb (95 kg)	December 18, 1951	North Carolina
SG	15	Patrick McFarland	6 ft 5 in (1.96 m)	185 lb (84 kg)	December 7, 1951	Saint Joseph's
C	25	Dave Robisch	6 ft 10 in (2.08 m)	235 lb (107 kg)	December 22, 1949	Kansas
SG	44	Ralph Simpson	6 ft 5 in (1.96 m)	200 lb (91 kg)	August 10, 1949	Michigan State
PG	14	Fatty Taylor	6 ft 0 in (1.83 m)	175 lb (79 kg)	March 13, 1946	La Salle
SF	21	Claude Terry	6 ft 4 in (1.93 m)	195 lb (88 kg)	January 12, 1950	Stanford
SF	32	Jan van Breda Kolff	6 ft 7 in (2.01 m)	195 lb (88 kg)	December 16, 1951	Vanderbilt
SF	10	Donald Washington	6 ft 8 in (2.03 m)	210 lb (95 kg)	April 22, 1952	North Carolina

Coaches
Head coach
- Larry Brown

Legend
- (DP) Unsigned draft pick
- (FA) Free agent
- (S) Suspended
- Injured

Roster

== Standings ==
=== Eastern Division ===
Team	W	L	PCT.	GB
Kentucky Colonels	58	26	.690	-
New York Nets	58	26	.690	-
Spirits of St. Louis	32	52	.381	26
Memphis Sounds	27	57	.321	31
Virginia Squires	15	69	.179	43

=== Western Division ===
Team	W	L	PCT.	GB
Denver Nuggets	65	19	.774	-
San Antonio Spurs	51	33	.607	14
Indiana Pacers	45	39	.536	20
Utah Stars	38	46	.452	27
San Diego Conquistadors	31	53	.369	34

== Game log ==
- 1974-75 Denver Rockets Schedule and Results | Basketball-Reference.com

== Stats ==
Rk	Player	Age	G	MP	FG	FGA	FG%	3P	3PA	3P%	2P	2PA	2P%	FT	FTA	FT%	ORB	DRB	TRB	AST	STL	BLK	TOV	PF	PTS
1	Ralph Simpson	25	82	34.9	8.5	16.8	.505	0.0	0.1	.083	8.5	16.6	.509	3.7	4.9	.754	1.3	3.5	4.8	5.4	2.0	0.2	3.8	2.6	20.6
2	Mack Calvin	27	74	33.3	6.5	13.5	.485	0.0	0.2	.188	6.5	13.2	.490	6.4	7.2	.896	0.5	2.4	2.8	7.7	1.9	0.1	3.8	2.8	19.5
3	Bobby Jones	23	84	32.2	6.3	10.4	.604	0.0	0.0	.000	6.3	10.4	.605	2.2	3.2	.695	2.7	5.5	8.2	3.6	2.0	1.8	2.8	3.1	14.8
4	Mike Green	23	81	31.6	7.3	13.5	.542	0.0	0.0	.000	7.3	13.5	.544	2.8	3.8	.738	3.5	5.8	9.2	1.2	1.0	2.1	2.5	3.3	17.4
5	Fatty Taylor	28	76	26.6	3.3	7.7	.428	0.1	0.3	.286	3.2	7.4	.434	1.7	2.3	.750	1.1	1.8	2.9	4.4	2.3	0.2	3.3	3.1	8.4
6	Dave Robisch	25	84	22.6	4.7	9.3	.503	0.0	0.0	.000	4.7	9.3	.504	3.6	4.1	.879	1.9	4.1	6.0	1.8	0.5	0.6	1.3	2.4	13.0
7	Byron Beck	30	84	21.6	4.6	8.9	.515	0.0	0.0	.000	4.6	8.9	.516	1.0	1.2	.835	1.5	2.6	4.1	1.3	0.7	0.2	0.9	3.2	10.1
8	Jan van Breda Kolff	23	84	19.5	1.8	4.1	.453	0.0	0.0	.000	1.8	4.0	.457	2.1	2.5	.839	1.4	2.8	4.3	2.2	0.6	0.5	1.5	2.0	5.8
9	Claude Terry	25	70	14.1	2.8	5.2	.530	0.1	0.4	.400	2.6	4.8	.540	1.0	1.3	.761	0.8	1.2	2.0	1.6	0.5	0.0	1.1	1.2	6.7
10	Patrick McFarland	23	70	13.5	2.9	6.1	.472	0.0	0.2	.125	2.8	5.8	.485	0.7	0.9	.788	0.5	1.2	1.7	1.7	0.7	0.1	1.5	0.9	6.5
11	Donald Washington	22	50	8.8	1.6	3.7	.432	0.0	0.0	.000	1.6	3.6	.436	0.8	1.1	.679	0.8	1.0	1.8	0.6	0.2	0.4	1.0	1.8	3.9

== ABA Playoffs ==
ABA Western Semifinals

Game	Date	Location	Score	Record	Attendance
1	April 6	Denver	122–107	1–0	7,200
2	April 7	Denver	126–120	2–0	7,298
3	April 9	Utah	108–122	2–1	5,694
4	April 11	Utah	110–132	2–2	9,106
5	April 12	Denver	130–119	3–2	7,498
6	April 14	Utah	115–113	4–2	8,448

Nuggets win series, 4–2

ABA Western Division finals

Game	Date	Location	Score	Record	Attendance
1	April 20	Denver	131–128	1–0	7,444
2	April 22	Denver	124–131	1–1	7,491
3	April 24	Indiana	112–118	1–2	15,496
4	April 25	Indiana	126–109	2–2	17,389
5	April 27	Denver	90–109	2–3	7,483
6	April 30	Indiana	104–99	3–3	17,421
7	May 3	Denver	96–104	3–4	7,401

Nuggets lose series, 4–3

== Awards and honors ==
=== League leaders ===
- Field goal percentage: Bobby Jones
- Free throw percentage: Mack Calvin
- Assists per game:Mack Calvin
- Offensive Rating: Dave Robisch

=== All-ABA Teams ===
- Mack Calvin - 1st Team

=== All-Defensive Team ===
- Bobby Jones

=== All-Rookie Team ===
- Bobby Jones

=== ABA All-Stars ===
- Mack Calvin
- Mike Green
- Ralph Simpson
