= Carl Scheer =

American basketball executive (1936–2019)

- Born: December 14, 1936; Springfield, Massachusetts, U.S.
- Died: December 13, 2019 (aged 82); Charlotte, North Carolina, U.S.
- Education: Middlebury College; University of Miami School of Law
- Basketball career

Career history
- 1970–1974: Carolina Cougars (GM)
- 1974–1985: Denver Nuggets (GM)
- 1985–1987: Los Angeles Clippers (GM)
- 1986–1987: CBA (commissioner)
- 1987–1990: Charlotte Hornets (GM)
- 1990–1991: Denver Nuggets (GM)

Carl Scheer (December 14, 1936 – December 13, 2019) was an American basketball executive. Over his career, he served as the general manager of the Denver Nuggets, Los Angeles Clippers and Charlotte Hornets. He was also the commissioner of the Continental Basketball Association. He was the first GM in Hornets history and is credited as the inventor of the NBA Slam Dunk Contest.

== Early life and career ==
Carl Scheer was born on December 14, 1936, in Springfield, Massachusetts to Robert and Minette Scheer. He was educated in Springfield and was an all-state basketball player. He graduated from Middlebury College, where he played basketball, and University of Miami School of Law before settling in Greensboro, North Carolina.

== Basketball career ==
After law school, he became an agent and was hired as an assistant to then-NBA Commissioner, J. Walter Kennedy. In 1970, he jumped to the NBA to become GM of the Buffalo Braves, leaving a few months later for the Carolina Cougars. In 1974, both Scheer and Larry Brown moved to the Denver Rockets (later the Nuggets) as the Cougars owner planned to fold the franchise. with Brown as the head coach, Scheer built a team with Bobby Jones, David Thompson and Dan Issel that made it to the 1975–76 ABA Finals.

It was in Denver that Scheer introduced the Slam Dunk Contest for the 1976 ABA All-Star Game, that featured David Thompson, Julius Erving and Artis Gilmore. Scheer made the contest a longstanding part of the NBA when he revived the idea for the 1984 NBA All-Star Game in Denver.

In 1976, Scheer and Brown led the Nuggets through the merger with the NBA with the team entering the new merged league. Denver won two straight Midwest Division titles upon entering the NBA, and advanced to the 1978 Western Conference Final. Eventually, Scheer and Brown clashed, and Brown resigned midway through the 1978–79 season.

Denver shuffled the front office and Scheer left the Nuggets in 1984. He moved to the Los Angeles Clippers in July 1984. His stay in Los Angeles was short after battling with team ownership and he ended up taking the job of commissioner of the Continental Basketball Association in 1986.

One year later, Scheer was tapped to be the general manager of the New Jersey Nets. However, only a few months later, the expansion Charlotte Hornets hired him as the new general manager once his commitments to the CBA ended. Charlotte owner George Shinn wanted Scheer to work under a handshake agreement while Scheer, an attorney, sought a multi-year contract. The dispute led to Scheer's resignation in 1990. He left Charlotte to take over as president of the Nuggets.

Scheer's second stay in Denver was short, as he left only 14 months later amid other departures in the front office.

In his later career, Scheer worked as an executive with two minor-league hockey teams, the Charlotte Checkers and the Greenville Grrrowl.

== Personal life ==
Scheer was married to Marsha (Krieger) Scheer from 1959 until his death. He had two children, Bob and Lauren. Scheer died on December 13, 2019, at the age of 82, from complications of dementia, in Charlotte, North Carolina.
