= Roger Brown (basketball, born 1950) =

American sportsperson and basketball player (1950–2023)

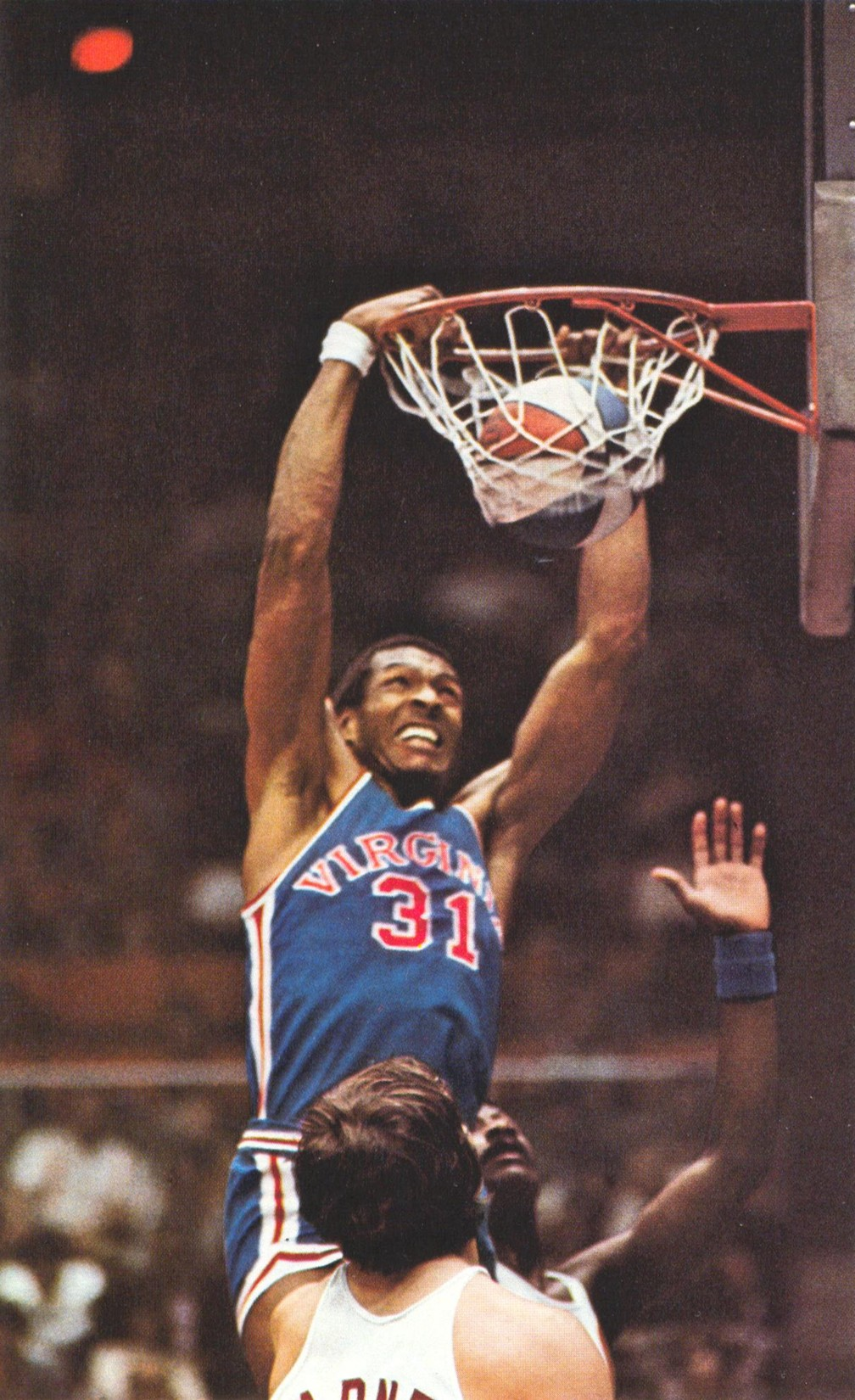

Personal information
- Born: February 23, 1950 Chicago, Illinois, U.S.
- Died: October 18, 2023 (aged 73) Chicago, Illinois, U.S.
- Listed height: 6 ft 11 in (2.11 m)
- Listed weight: 225 lb (102 kg)

Career information
- High school: Englewood (Chicago, Illinois)
- College: Kansas (1968–1971)
- NBA draft: 1971: 4th round, 64th overall pick
- Drafted by: Los Angeles Lakers
- Playing career: 1972–1980
- Position: Center
- Number: 30, 54, 42, 31, 20, 55

Career history
- 1972: Los Angeles Lakers
- 1972–1973: Carolina Cougars
- 1973: San Antonio Spurs
- 1973–1974: Virginia Squires
- 1975–1976: Denver Nuggets
- 1976–1977: Detroit Pistons
- 1978–1979: Tucson Gunners
- 1979–1980: Chicago Bulls

Career highlights
- ABA All-Star (1976)
- Stats at NBA.com
- Stats at Basketball Reference

Walter Roger Brown (February 23, 1950 – October 18, 2023) was an American National Basketball Association (NBA) and American Basketball Association (ABA) basketball player.

== Amateur career ==
A 6'11" center out of Englewood Technical Prep Academy in Chicago, he played collegiate basketball for the University of Kansas, averaging a double-double of 11.9 ppg and 11.3 rpg in his senior season, helping the Jayhawks to the Final Four in the 1971 NCAA University Division basketball tournament.

== Professional career ==
Drafted in the 4th round by the Los Angeles Lakers in the 1971 NBA draft, Brown played one game for LA before being released. He quickly signed with the Carolina Cougars of the rival ABA, averaging 2.4 ppg in limited duty. He spent 1973–74 with the San Antonio Spurs and the Virginia Squires in the ABA, but would sit out the 1974–75 season.

Brown started the 1975–76 season with the Denver Nuggets in the ABA, but would return to the NBA, signing with the Detroit Pistons in January 1976, and would spend the remainder of that season and the following 1977-78 season with Detroit, backing up All-Star Bob Lanier, and helping Detroit to two post-season playoff berths. Brown followed former Pistons coach Herb Brown to the Western Basketball Association and the Tucson Gunners for 1978–79, winning a WBL championship with a third-team All-WBL season. He would then return to the NBA in 1979 with his hometown Chicago Bulls for a 4-game stint to finish his professional career.

Roger Brown died in Chicago on October 18, 2023, at the age of 73.

== Career statistics ==
Legend
GP	Games played	GS	Games started	MPG	Minutes per game
FG%	Field goal percentage	3P%	3-point field goal percentage	FT%	Free throw percentage
RPG	Rebounds per game	APG	Assists per game	SPG	Steals per game
BPG	Blocks per game	PPG	Points per game	**Bold**	Career high

=== NBA/ABA ===
==== Regular season ====
Year	Team	GP	GS	MPG	FG%	3P%	FT%	RPG	APG	SPG	BPG	PPG
1972–73	L.A. Lakers (NBA)	1		5.0	–		.333	.0	.0			1.0
1972–73	Carolina (ABA)	62		9.3	.457	–	.549	2.9	.4			2.4
1973–74	San Antonio (ABA)	2		13.0	**.833**	–	–	3.0	.5	.0	.0	**5.0**
1973–74	Virginia (ABA)	**61**		**15.8**	.366	–	.607	**5.7**	**.7**	**.4**	**1.0**	3.6
1975–76	Denver (ABA)	37		7.9	.459	**1.000**	.667	2.0	.6	.2	.6	2.0
1975–76	Detroit (NBA)	29		15.7	.403	–	**.778**	4.5	.4	.2	.9	2.5
1976–77	Detroit (NBA)	43		7.5	.375	–	.692	2.1	.3	.3	.4	1.4
1979–80	Chicago (NBA)	4	0	9.3	.333	–	–	2.5	.3	.0	.8	.5
Career (NBA)		77	0	10.6	.389	–	.702	3.0	.3	.3	.6	1.8
Career (ABA)		162		11.5	.411	1.000	.595	3.7	.6	.3	.8	2.8
Career (overall)		239	0	11.2	.406	1.000	.624	3.5	.5	.3	.7	2.4
All-Star (ABA)		1		9.0	1.000	–	–	3.0	3.0			4.0

==== Playoffs ====
Year	Team	GP	MPG	FG%	3P%	FT%	RPG	APG	SPG	BPG	PPG
1973	Carolina (ABA)	7	5.7	**.714**	–	**1.000**	1.6	.1			1.6
1974	Virginia (ABA)	5	**10.0**	.474	–	.667	**2.8**	**.4**	.0	**.4**	**4.0**
1976	Detroit (NBA)	**9**	5.7	.444		.500	1.6	.2	.0	.1	1.1
1977	Detroit (NBA)	2	2.5	.000		–	.0	.0	.0	.5	.0
Career (ABA)		12	7.5	.538	–	.750	2.1	.3	.0	.4	2.6
Career (NBA)		11	5.1	.400		.500	1.3	.2	.0	.2	.9
Career (overall)		23	6.3	.500	–	.625	1.7	.2	.0	.3	1.8
