= Bobby Jones (basketball, born 1951) =

American basketball player (born 1951)

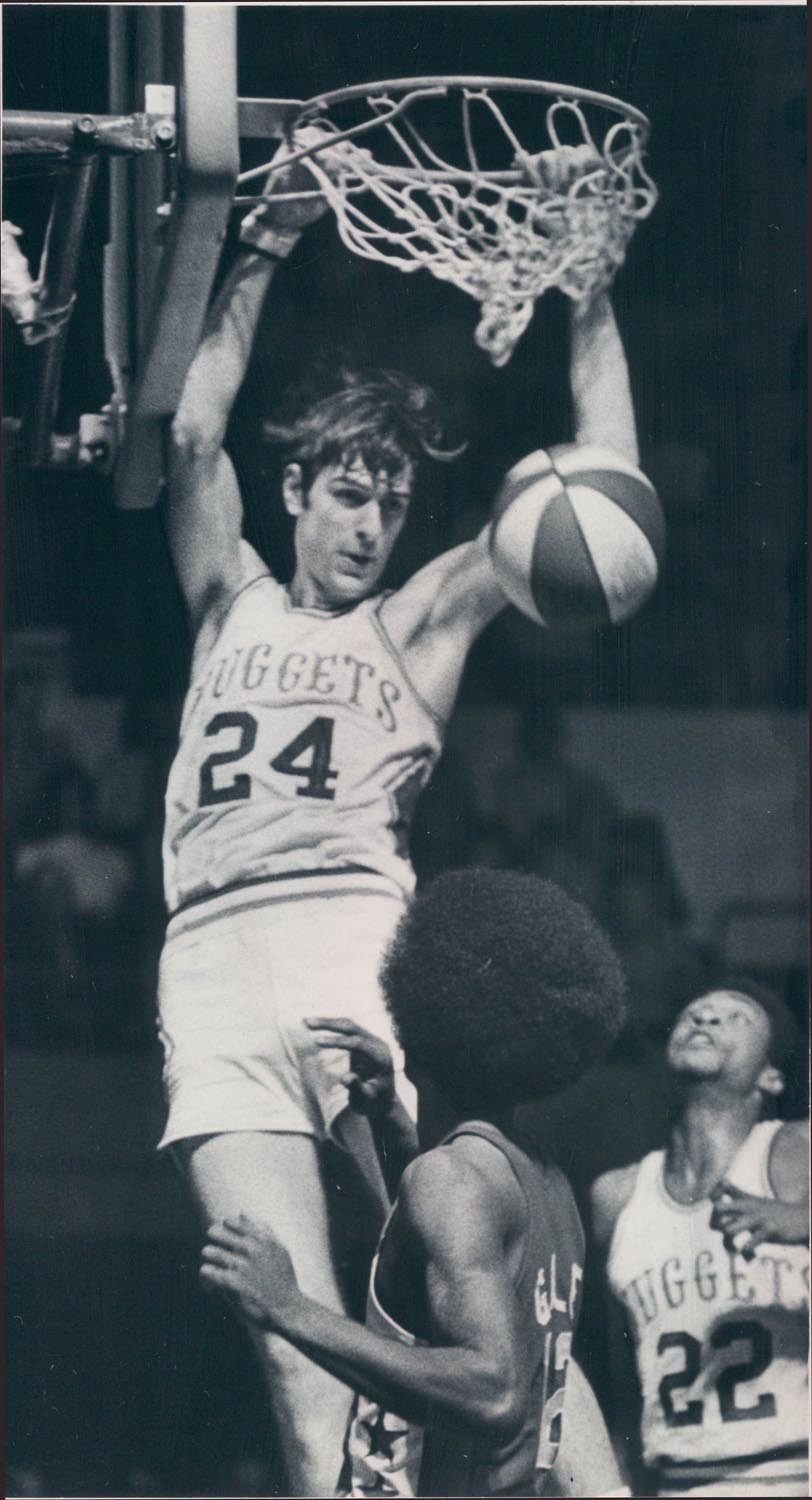
- Jones with the Denver Nuggets in the late 1970s

Personal information
- Born: December 18, 1951 (age 74) Akron, Ohio, U.S.
- Listed height: 6 ft 9 in (2.06 m)
- Listed weight: 210 lb (95 kg)

Career information
- High school: South Mecklenburg (Charlotte, North Carolina)
- College: North Carolina (1971–1974)
- NBA draft: 1974: 1st round, 5th overall pick
- Drafted by: Houston Rockets
- Playing career: 1974–1986
- Position: Power forward
- Number: 24

Career history
- 1974–1978: Denver Nuggets
- 1978–1986: Philadelphia 76ers

Career highlights
- NBA champion (1983); 4× NBA All-Star (1977, 1978, 1981, 1982); 8× NBA All-Defensive First Team (1977–1984); NBA All-Defensive Second Team (1985); NBA Sixth Man of the Year (1983); ABA All-Star (1976); All-ABA Second Team (1976); 2× ABA All-Defensive First Team (1975, 1976); ABA All-Rookie First Team (1975); No. 24 retired by Philadelphia 76ers; Consensus second-team All-American (1974); First-team All-ACC (1974); Second-team All-ACC (1973); No. 34 honored by North Carolina Tar Heels; Coach Wooden "Keys to Life" Award (2005)

Career ABA and NBA statistics
- Points: 11,391 (12.1 ppg)
- Rebounds: 5,739 (6.1 rpg)
- Assists: 2,522 (2.7 apg)
- Stats at NBA.com
- Stats at Basketball Reference
- Basketball Hall of Fame
Medals
Men's Basketball
Representing the United States
Olympic Games
Silver medal – second place	1972 Munich	Team competition

Robert Clyde Jones (born December 18, 1951) is an American former professional basketball player who played for the Denver Nuggets in the American Basketball Association (ABA) and the Philadelphia 76ers in the National Basketball Association (NBA). Nicknamed "the Secretary of Defense", Jones won an NBA championship with the 76ers in 1983, was a four-time NBA All-Star, a nine-time member of the NBA All-Defensive Team, and was the NBA Sixth Man of the Year in 1983. In 2019, Jones was elected to the Naismith Memorial Basketball Hall of Fame.

== Early life ==
Jones was born in Akron, Ohio, but he and his family were constantly on the move. When he was in the sixth grade, they moved to Charlotte, North Carolina, where they settled down. He grew up in a family that valued sports. His father J.R., a World War II veteran who had served in Japan, had played on the 1947 Oklahoma Sooners national championship runner-up team and later on became a nationally ranked tennis player. His mother Hazel was a dominant high school athlete in basketball and tennis. Older brother Kirby was All-State in high school basketball and later a Sooner, who was also a state champion in tennis.

As a child, Jones often spent his days watching television, describing himself as a "couch potato". J.R. then made him play on the church's league basketball team. When he was in sixth grade, his father built a basketball court. When his father was away working for Goodyear, he would assign them drills to work on. One of those drills was shooting right-handed, despite being left-handed. He would do his drills during commercials. Eventually, he grew to enjoy the drills. As he got better at basketball, it became a way for him to socialize in high school and gain self-esteem.

== High school career ==
Jones attended South Mecklenburg High School in Charlotte, where played basketball and competed in track and field. His brother Kirby had also previously played for South Mecklenburg before playing for the Oklahoma Sooners.

Jones preferred track and field, because he could practice by himself on his own terms. He was a two-time state champion in the high jump, finishing second his junior year to future North Carolina teammate and fellow NBA Hall of Famer Bob McAdoo. As a senior, Jones set a state record of 6 feet, 8 inches. Despite his track and field success, his father pushed him to pursue basketball.

In basketball during his junior year, Jones earned Charlotte's Player of the Year Award and led South Mecklenburg into the state playoffs, where his squad lost to Greensboro Ben L. Smith that starred McAdoo. In his senior year, Jones led South Mecklenburg to the 1970 NCHSAA 4A state title and was also named MVP of the state championship game. Still, with all of his success in the sport, Jones did not think much about a future in it, but decided to pursue a basketball scholarship help pay for his education.

He was recruited by the University of North Carolina, Duke University, and Florida. He also had interest in Davidson College, as he regularly attended their games. His family also tried to convince him to play for Oklahoma, but it was too far for him.

== College career ==
Jones chose North Carolina, as he connected with the coaching staff headed by Dean Smith, which included Bill Guthridge and John Lotz. NCAA eligibility rules at the time prohibited him from playing as a freshman, allowing him to learn defensive skills from Smith and Guthridge. As a sophomore, Jones set an Atlantic Coast Conference single-season record 66.8% from the floor, and averaged 10.2 points and 6.3 rebounds a game while helping UNC reach the Final Four (where they fell to the Florida State Seminoles).

After his time with the U.S. national basketball team, Jones started the gesture of pointing to teammates who passed him the ball to create a scoring opportunity, whether he made the shot or not. Coach Smith called the show of appreciation to his teammates "The Bobby Jones Rule". In his junior season, he averaged 15.5 points and 10.5 rebounds.

The American Basketball Association (ABA)'s Carolina Cougars selected Jones after his junior season in the 1973 Special Circumstances Draft, but he wanted to finish his psychology degree and polish his game, so he returned to North Carolina for his senior year while the Cougars held on to his ABA rights. For his senior year, he was named co-captain of the team.

He produced an All-America campaign in 1973–74, averaging 16.1 points and 9.8 rebounds. He turned in memorable performances against Duke that season, including a clutch steal and game-winning layup against them in March. On UNC's "Senior Day", he contributed four points in the clutch as the team scored eight straight points to tie the game and eventually win in overtime 96–92. He finished that game with 24 points. Jones ended his career with averages of 13.7 points and 8.9 rebounds per game, while shooting 60.8% from the field; he graduated with his psychology degree.

== Professional career ==
=== Denver Nuggets (1974–1978) ===
==== 1974–1976: ABA years ====
Jones was selected by the Houston Rockets with the fifth overall pick in the 1974 NBA draft. Meanwhile, the Cougars franchise (then known as the Spirits of St. Louis), still held onto his ABA draft rights. Former Carolina Coach Larry Brown had moved on to the Denver Nuggets, and he was determined to acquire him. The Nuggets traded for his rights with St. Louis in exchange for the rights to center Marvin Barnes. Jones chose to join Denver, as he would have more playing time there.

With Brown's coaching and Jones in the frontcourt, Denver went 65–19 in 1974–75, a 28-game improvement and franchise record. Jones shot .604 from the floor for an ABA record, scored 14.8 points per game, and won a spot on the ABA All-Rookie Team. However, Denver lost to the Indiana Pacers in the Western Division Finals.

In the 1975–76 season, the ABA's last, Jones averaged 15 points, nine rebounds, four assists, two steals, and two blocks, and once again topped the league in field-goal percentage. He also played in the 1976 ABA All-Star Game, where he scored 24 points with 10 rebounds, and was named to the All-ABA Second Team. The Nuggets, with stars David Thompson and Dan Issel, finished with a league-best 60–24 record, but fell to the New York Nets in the Finals.

==== 1976–1978; Transition to the NBA ====
The Nuggets transitioned to the NBA in 1976 as part of the ABA–NBA merger. In the 1976–77 season, Denver won the Midwest Division. Jones averaged a career-high 15.1 points and 8.3 rebounds with a .570 field-goal percentage, and started in his first NBA All-Star Game alongside Thompson and Issel. He also outpolled all other players in earning the first of eight straight selections to the NBA All-Defensive First Team, as he had the best defensive rating in the league. They lost to the eventual champions the Portland Trail Blazers in the semis.

The following season Jones averaged 14.5 points, elevated his field-goal percentage to a league-leading .578, and returned to the All-Star Game. Denver won their division once again. However, due to the phenobarbital he was taking for his epilepsy, his performance dipped in the playoffs, and the Nuggets were eliminated in six games by the Seattle Supersonics in the Western Conference finals.

Denver management feared Jones would be limited by his health problems, as his epilepsy was getting worse throughout the season. This would be his final season in there. He finished his stint in Denver with averages of 14.8 points, 8.6 rebounds, 1.9 blocks and 2.0 steals per game. As of 2024 he was #7 on the team's all-time steals list, and #4 in all-time blocks.

=== Philadelphia 76ers (1978–1986) ===
==== 1978–1979: First season ====
After the 1977–78 campaign Jones was traded to the Philadelphia 76ers alongside Ralph Simpson for forward George McGinnis with both teams exchanging draft picks and both Jones and McGinnis waiving their no-trade clauses. The trade came with a clause that should Jones be disabled due to epilepsy, the 76ers would receive a draft pick. There he joined a team that was coached by another UNC alum, former forward and future NBA Hall of Famer Billy Cunningham. On March 7, 1979, he scored a career-high 33 points. That season, they won 47 games as he averaged 12.5 points, 6.5 rebounds, 2.5 assists, 1.3 steals, and 1.2 blocks per game, and led the league in field goal percentage. He was also selected to the First-Team All-Defense once again.

==== 1979–1982: Coming off the bench ====
Primarily a starter during his four seasons with the Nuggets, Jones made another transition after his first year with the Sixers. Coach Cunningham thought Jones would be best utilized as a sixth man, coming off the bench for the frontline Julius Erving, Darryl Dawkins, and Caldwell Jones. Cunningham was worried that the change would devastate Jones, but it took Jones about half a minute to agree to the coach's plan.

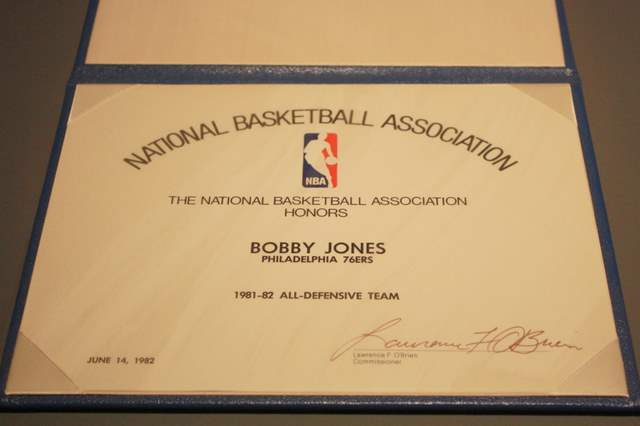
Certificate presented to Jones for NBA All-Defensive honors in 1981–82.

Beginning with the 1979–80 campaign, Jones still averaged about 25 minutes. He also scored 14.4 points in his first season off the bench, his highest scoring average in his time with the Sixers. They won the Eastern conference championship but lost in the 1980 NBA Finals to the Los Angeles Lakers in six games that season.

He returned to the NBA All-Star Game in 1981 as he was voted in by the coaches. Their season ended on a one-point loss to the Boston Celtics in the Eastern Conference finals.

In 1981–82, Bobby Jones briefly returned to the starting lineup for that season, starting 73 games. He was an All-Star again that season. They avenged their loss to the Celtics the previous season in an Eastern Conference finals rematch, but lost once again to the Lakers in six games.

==== 1982–1983: Championship season ====
The arrival of star center Moses Malone from Houston for Caldwell Jones prior to the 1982–83 campaign was seen as a gamechanger for the Sixers' title hopes. In the regular season, they went on a 14-game win streak, and won 65 games. Bobby Jones finished the season third in the league in defensive box plus-minus.

In the playoffs, the 76ers began with a sweep of the New York Knicks, although each game was decided by fewer than 10 points. In game one of the conference finals, the Milwaukee Bucks led by 109–108 with one minute 36 seconds to go in overtime. Alton Lister of the Bucks tried to inbound the ball but Jones stole the pass and flipped the ball to Clint Richardson. Richardson scored on a dunk to send the 76ers ahead 110–109. A Philadelphia Inquirer article on Jones paraphrased the famous John Havlicek call by Johnny Most stating, "Bobby Jones stole the ball. It was grand larceny. Bobby Jones stole the ball and robbed the Milwaukee Bucks of a game, turning an almost-sure upset into a 111–109 overtime victory for the 76ers." In Game 2, he had a crucial block on Brian Winters that helped seal the win for the 76ers.

After a Game 4 loss to Milwaukee, Philadelphia then rolled through the rest of the playoffs, eventually sweeping the Lakers in the 1983 NBA Finals. After the season ended, Jones won the first-ever NBA Sixth Man of the Year Award. From the Eastern Conference finals to the NBA Finals, he averaged 1.7 steals and 1.9 blocks.

==== 1983–1986: Final seasons ====
The Sixers began a steady decline after that championship year, finishing second to Boston the next three seasons. While Jones continued to play steady defense, his offense began a gradual tail-off with reduced playing time and productivity. In the 1985–86 season Jones only averaged 6.6 points per game despite returning to the starting lineup, but still shot a highly efficient .559 from the floor. That season, Philadelphia was eliminated by the Bucks in the playoffs.

Jones retired shortly afterward, on November 7, 1986, at age 34. The Sixers retired his uniform No. 24.

In his 12-year professional career, Jones was named to the NBA All-Defensive First Team eight times and the Second Team twice; earned the first-ever NBA Sixth Man Award; was on the ABA All-Rookie Team; was a four-time NBA All-Star and one time in the ABA; and won an NBA Championship with the Philadelphia 76ers, in 1983. Over his career, he averaged 12.1 points and 6.1 rebounds, and his teams never missed the playoffs.

== National team career ==
In 1972, tryouts for the U.S. Olympic Team were about to be held. Jones was not invited to the trials at first, so he attended summer school. When Dean Smith heard that a couple of players were declining invitations as a form of protest, he got in touch with Jones. After making sure Jones was healthy (as he was recovering from a seizure at the time) he invited him to the tryouts. Jones made the team, and quit summer school. He started all but one game due to a finger injury. He played only five minutes in the Soviet Union's controversial win over the United States in the gold medal game.

== Player profile ==
Jones was known as a versatile defensive player. Although listed as a power forward, he often guarded the other team's best small forward. In college, he could guard big men and guards. He was also known for being both active and athletic, which helped him deny the ball and box out for rebounds.

A personal goal of his was to get at least 100 blocks and 100 steals every season, which he achieved six times. Jones is one of only seven players in both NBA and ABA history to total at least 1,300 blocks and 1,300 steals, with averages of 1.5 steals and 1.4 blocks. In his NBA career, he made the top 20 in defensive rating six times. He made the ABA and NBA All-Defensive Team in almost every season he played, with his final NBA season being the only season he did not make any All-Defensive Team. He credits his time at North Carolina for his development on defense.

Jones was not seen as a scorer, averaging 12.1 points per game in his career and scoring more than 30 points in a game only four times. When teams left him open however, he could make shots. Although he is not a three-point shooter (he shot 0-for-17 in his NBA career), he could make shots consistently from the elbow. At 6'9", he was also great at running fast breaks. Those skills, along with being an ambidextrous finisher and being smart with his shot selection, helped give him a career field goal percentage of 56%. He never shot below 52% in any season of his career. His field goal percentage of 59.2 is the ABA's all-time record. He also rarely turned the ball over.

Although he had the skills to be a starter, Jones often came off the bench. This was good for him as it allowed him to scout the opposition and conserve energy for late-game situations. It also helped his physical condition, as he was taking medication for his epilepsy at the time. It was only in his first three seasons in the league that he averaged more than 30 minutes per game, while he averaged 25 minutes per game with the 76ers.

Jones has been lauded for his selfless mentality and the intense effort he gave in games. "If I was going to ask a youngster to model after someone, I would pick Bobby Jones." said longtime 76ers teammate Julius Erving, "He's a player who's totally selfless, who runs like a deer, jumps like a gazelle, plays with his head and heart each night, and then walks away from the court as if nothing happened." Opponents called him "one of the toughest to play against". He was a part of 595 wins throughout his career from the ABA to the NBA, almost twice the number of games he lost.

Jones was always honest and polite with referees. He would admit to referees if he was the one who sent the ball out of bounds or if he had fouled a player, even if it didn't help the team in the moment. Larry Brown, Jones's coach with the Denver Nuggets, remarked, "Watching Bobby Jones on the basketball court is like watching an honest man in a liars’ poker game." As a result, referees would respect him and more calls would go their way. Referee Joey Crawford said that Jones "was the most polite player" he ever dealt with. In his Naismith Hall of Fame speech, he gave credit to the referees.

In his entire career, Jones was never called for a technical foul. He was aggressive when he needed to foul, but did so without being seen as dirty.

== Career statistics ==
Legend
GP	Games played	GS	Games started	MPG	Minutes per game
FG%	Field goal percentage	3P%	3-point field goal percentage	FT%	Free throw percentage
RPG	Rebounds per game	APG	Assists per game	SPG	Steals per game
BPG	Blocks per game	PPG	Points per game	**Bold**	Career high
*	Led the league

‡	ABA record

=== Regular season ===
Year	Team	GP	GS	MPG	FG%	3P%	FT%	RPG	APG	SPG	BPG	PPG
1974–75	Denver (ABA)	**84***	—	32.2	**.604**‡	.000	.695	8.2	3.6	2.0	1.8	14.8
1975–76	Denver (ABA)	83	—	**34.3**	.581*	—	.698	**9.5**	**4.0**	2.0	**2.2**	14.9
1976–77	Denver (NBA)	82	**82**	29.5	.570	—	.717	8.3	3.2	**2.3**	2.0	**15.1**
1977–78	Denver (NBA)	75	—	32.5	.578*	—	.751	8.5	3.4	1.8	1.7	14.5
1978–79	Philadelphia (NBA)	80	78	28.8	.537	—	.755	6.6	2.5	1.3	1.2	12.1
1979–80	Philadelphia (NBA)	81	3	26.2	.532	.000	.781	5.6	1.8	1.3	1.5	13.0
1980–81	Philadelphia (NBA)	81	0	25.3	.539	.000	**.813**	5.4	2.8	1.2	.9	13.5
1981–82	Philadelphia (NBA)	76	73	28.7	.564	.000	.790	5.2	2.5	1.3	1.5	14.4
1982–83†	Philadelphia (NBA)	74	0	23.6	.543	.000	.793	4.6	1.9	1.1	1.2	9.0
1983–84	Philadelphia (NBA)	75	0	23.5	.523	.000	.784	4.3	2.5	1.4	1.4	8.3
1984–85	Philadelphia (NBA)	80	8	20.4	.538	.000	.861	3.7	1.9	1.1	.6	7.5
1985–86	Philadelphia (NBA)	70	42	21.7	.559	.000	.786	2.4	1.8	.7	.7	7.0
Career ABA		167		33.2	.592‡	.000	.697	8.9	3.8	2.0	2.0	14.9
Career NBA		774	286	26.1	.550	.000	.780	5.5	2.4	1.4	1.3	11.5
Career total		941	286	27.3	.560	.000	.766	4.2	2.7	1.5	1.4	12.1
All-Star NBA		4	1	22.8	.486	.000	.714	8.0	2.3	.5	.8	11.0

=== Playoffs ===
Year	Team	GP	GS	MPG	FG%	3P%	FT%	RPG	APG	SPG	BPG	PPG
1974–75	Denver (ABA)	13	—	32.9	.535	.000	.775	8.5	2.9	.9	.9	13.0
1975–76	Denver (ABA)	13	—	**33.2**	.583	—	.732	**8.6**	**4.5**	1.2	1.5	13.7
1976–77	Denver (NBA)	6	—	31.2	.484	—	.588	5.8	3.5	**2.8**	**2.3**	12.0
1977–78	Denver (NBA)	13	—	30.0	.569	—	.739	7.8	2.7	1.2	.7	12.8
1978–79	Philadelphia (NBA)	9	—	28.9	.552	—	.846	4.8	2.1	.6	.4	13.1
1979–80	Philadelphia (NBA)	18	—	26.1	.523	.000	.855	4.8	1.7	1.2	1.8	12.9
1980–81	Philadelphia (NBA)	16	—	27.7	.506	—	.830	5.5	2.1	1.1	1.3	**14.7**
1981–82	Philadelphia (NBA)	**21**	—	28.0	.540	—	.840	4.7	2.5	.7	1.0	12.2
1982–83†	Philadelphia (NBA)	12	—	27.0	.551	.000	.850	4.8	2.8	1.3	1.5	8.6
1983–84	Philadelphia (NBA)	5	—	26.0	.484	—	**.947**	4.6	1.8	.6	1.4	9.6
1984–85	Philadelphia (NBA)	13	**11**	23.8	**.590**	—	.700	3.7	1.2	.9	1.5	8.2
1985–86	Philadelphia (NBA)	12	5	27.4	.527	.000	.760	2.7	2.8	.8	1.3	9.7
Career ABA		26		33.0	.559	.000	.753	8.6	3.7	1.1	1.2	13.3
Career NBA		125	16	27.4	.535	.000	.809	4.9	2.3	1.1	1.2	11.6
Career total		151	16	28.4	.540	.000	.800	5.5	2.5	1.1	1.2	11.9

== Endorsements ==
Jones endorsed Nike throughout his career. In 1982, Jones was one of the first athletes to wear Nike's Air Force 1 sneakers. Nike also made a marketing campaign around him, which included a poster that dubbed him "The Secretary of Defense".

== Post-retirement ==
In 1988, Billy Cunningham, who had just helped establish the Miami Heat, attempted to persuade Jones to play for Heat. After a physical and a scrimmage, he decided against returning. The Charlotte Hornets also tried to hire him as their general manager, but he turned them down.

After retiring, Jones became a public speaker. He speaks at churches and schools, both local and international. He also stays in touch with the 76ers organization and is often invited to speak to the team.

In 2003, Jones cofounded a Charlotte, North Carolina–based religiously affiliated non-profit, 2xsalt, that supports underprivileged youth through sports, along with Bart Kofoed and former teammate David Thompson.

Jones has coached several school basketball teams in the Charlotte area including Charlotte Christian School for 12 years, where he won three state titles. He then became an assistant coach at Carmel Christian School. At Carmel Christian, he also coached their tennis team, held basketball clinics there, and was their summer camp coordinator. He also coached Myers Park High School and the South Charlotte Thunder.

== Personal life ==
Jones is married and he and his wife have three children and seven grandchildren. They live in Charlotte, North Carolina. One of his sons, Eric, played for UNC's junior varsity team.

Jones suffers occasional epileptic seizures, which require medication. His first seizure occurred when he was a sophomore at UNC after an intramural volleyball game. At the time, he was misdiagnosed with pericarditis, an inflammation of the heart sac. He experienced three more seizures from 1976 to 1978. In 1978, stricken by a seizure in his kitchen one day, Jones fell onto a butcher block and gashed open his head. The incident nearly led him to quit basketball. After he was traded to Philadelphia, he vowed to be more open about his diagnosis to break the stigma surrounding epilepsy. His perseverance earned him Philadelphia's Most Courageous Athlete Award in 1984, which he dedicated to his wife, Tess. He also suffered from a heart ailment, but after he was traded to Philadelphia, it never reoccurred again.

Jones is a devout Christian. He grew up attending a Baptist church and devoted his life to Christ when he was in college. He said that the Bible affected how he played basketball, as it commanded followers to give their best in everything they did. When a computer-generated ranking sponsored by Seagram Distillers rated Jones the NBA's "most consistent and productive player" in 1977, he donated the $10,000 prize to religious charities. Pat Williams, the general manager of the 76ers at the time, credited him for helping establish pregame chapel services, which all NBA teams still do to this day. Throughout his ordeal with epilepsy, he credits his faith for helping him get through it. He is also active with Christian ministries such as the Fellowship of Christian Athletes (FCA) and Athletes in Action. Cody Zeller credited Jones for helping him transition to the NBA as a spiritual mentor to him. Charles Barkley said of Jones, "If everyone in the world was like Bobby Jones, the world wouldn't have any problems."

== Legacy ==
The Sixers retired the No. 24 jersey in 1986. During his entire tenure with the Sixers, Jones' jersey always included the letter B with a period before his last name (B. JONES) above his number 24; he still wore it even after former teammate Caldwell Jones was traded for Moses Malone in 1982 and Caldwell's brother Charles left after only one season with the Sixers (1983–84). However, during the 2008 season, as part of the Sixers' 25th anniversary of the 1983 champions, he was given a framed replica jersey that simply states his last name without the letter B, since he was the only Sixer named Jones to play on the 1983 team. In 2018, a statue of him was unveiled at the Sixers' training complex. It shows him diving for a loose ball.

In May 1989, Jones was inducted into North Carolina's Sports Hall of Fame. On November 11, 2010, he was inducted into the Philadelphia Sports Hall of Fame. In 2015, he was inducted into the FCA's Hall of Fame. On April 6, 2019, he was elected to the Naismith Memorial Basketball Hall of Fame. He was inducted on September 6, 2019, with an introduction from Julius Erving and Charles Barkley, who filled in for his coach Billy Cunningham and David Thompson. In 2021, he was inducted into South Mecklenburg's first-ever Hall of Fame.

On January 28, 2020 Joel Embiid requested and was granted permission by Jones to wear his retired jersey number 24 for the Sixers, in honor of the late Kobe Bryant.

In 2008, Athletes in Action named an award after him, the Bobby Jones Award, which recognizes an NBA player "who lives an exemplary life on the basketball court, in the home and in the community".

== See also ==
- List of NBA career field goal percentage leaders
- Basketball at the 1972 Summer Olympics
