= James Silas =

American basketball player (born 1949)

Personal information
- Born: February 11, 1949 (age 77) Tallulah, Louisiana, U.S.
- Listed height: 6 ft 1 in (1.85 m)
- Listed weight: 180 lb (82 kg)

Career information
- High school: McCall (Tallulah, Louisiana)
- College: Stephen F. Austin (1968–1972)
- NBA draft: 1972: 5th round, 70th overall pick
- Drafted by: Houston Rockets
- Playing career: 1972–1982
- Position: Point guard
- Number: 13

Career history
- 1972–1981: Dallas Chaparrals / San Antonio Spurs
- 1981–1982: Cleveland Cavaliers

Career highlights
- 2× ABA All-Star (1975, 1976); All-ABA First Team (1976); All-ABA Second Team (1975); ABA All-Rookie First Team (1973); ABA All-Time Team; No. 13 retired by San Antonio Spurs

Career ABA and NBA statistics
- Points: 11,038 (16.1 ppg)
- Rebounds: 2,068 (3.0 rpg)
- Assists: 2,628 (3.8 apg)
- Stats at NBA.com
- Stats at Basketball Reference

James Edward Silas (born February 11, 1949) is an American former professional basketball player, who played the point guard position. Born in Tallulah, Louisiana, Silas played the majority of his career with the Dallas Chaparrals/San Antonio Spurs of the ABA/NBA. His nicknames include "the Snake", "Captain Late" and "the Late Mr. Silas", the latter two referring to the fact that Silas seemed to play his best late in games.

== Career ==
=== College ===
Silas played college basketball at Stephen F. Austin State University in Nacogdoches, Texas. In his senior year Silas led the Stephen F. Austin Lumberjacks to a 29–1 record, averaging 30.7 points per game. Silas was also named an NAIA All-American twice in his college career.

=== Professional ===
Silas was drafted in the fifth round of the 1972 NBA draft by the Houston Rockets. However, he was waived by the Rockets before the 1972–73 season even began. Babe McCarthy, who was coaching the Dallas Chaparrals of the American Basketball Association (ABA) at the time, decided to take a chance on Silas after the ABA team he was originally drafted by in the sixth round of the 1972 ABA draft, the Pittsburgh Condors, folded operations, and Silas signed with the Chaparrals in November 1972. Silas would prove his worth for the franchise, and at the end of the season he was named to the ABA All-Rookie team.

Following the 1972–73 season, the Chaparrals were sold and moved to San Antonio, becoming the San Antonio Spurs. Silas was named to the ABA All-Star team in 1975 and 1976, as well as the All-ABA 2nd team in 1975 and All-ABA 1st team in 1976. Silas's best year statistics-wise was easily 1976, when he averaged 23.8 points, 5.4 assists, and 4.0 rebounds per game; the points and assists per game would prove to be the highest in his career. He played in just one playoff game that year, as he suffered both a jammed big toe on his left foot and a chip fracture in his right ankle in the third quarter that knocked him out for the rest of the playoffs as the Spurs lost to the eventual ABA champion New York Nets.

During his first NBA preseason with Spurs against Kansas City Kings he suffered an injury on his left knee that caused him to play only 59 games in the next two years; After the injury he would never return to his previous level of playing.

Silas played for the Spurs for eight seasons (nine if the one season with the Dallas Chaparrals is included), including five years in the NBA after the Spurs moved into that league upon the completion of the ABA/NBA merger in 1976. Following the 1981 season Silas was traded to the Cleveland Cavaliers along with the rights to Rich Yonakur, where he played for one year before retiring.

Silas was an exceptional free throw shooter throughout his entire career, ranking in the top 10 in free throw percentage in six separate seasons, and finishing with a career free-throw percentage of 85.5%.

On February 28, 1984, Silas' #13 became the first number ever retired by the San Antonio Spurs, and he is currently one of only ten players to have received that honor from the franchise. He is also one of two Spurs players to have had his number retired while the franchise was a part of the ABA (alongside George Gervin), as well as the only Spurs player to have his number honored while also playing for the franchise back when they were named the Dallas Chaparrals instead.

=== Career statistics ===
Career Statistics
Career totals	Per-game averages	Playoffs totals	Playoff averages
Games played: 685; Points: 11,038; Rebounds: 2,069; Assists: 2,628; Steals: 608; PER: 17; Win Shares 60.8	Points: 16.1; Rebounds: 3.0; Assists: 3.8; Steals: 1.0	Games Played: 41; Points: 644; Rebounds: 124; Assists: 187; Steals: 32	Points: 15.7; Rebounds: 3.0; Assists: 4.6; Steals: 0.8
