= Bob MacKinnon =

American baseball player and coach (1927–2015)

Biographical details
- Born: December 5, 1927; Dunkirk, New York, U.S.
- Died: July 7, 2015 (aged 87); Williamsville, New York, U.S.

Coaching career (HC unless noted)

Baseball
- 1954–1959: Canisius

Basketball
- 1959–1972: Canisius
- 1972–1974: Buffalo Braves (assistant)
- 1974–1975: Spirits of St. Louis
- 1977: Buffalo Braves
- 1977–1978: Buffalo Braves (assistant)
- 1978–1979: Boston Celtics (assistant)
- 1979–1981: New Jersey Nets (assistant)
- 1980–1981: New Jersey Nets
- 1985–1987: New Jersey Nets (assistant)
- 1987–1988: New Jersey Nets

Administrative career (AD unless noted)
- 1959–1972: Canisius
- 1975–1977: Buffalo Braves (GM)
- 1981–1983: New Jersey Nets (GM)
- 1986–1987: New Jersey Nets (GM)

Accomplishments and honors

Awards
- Greater Buffalo Sports Hall of Fame (1995)

Robert MacKinnon (December 5, 1927 – July 7, 2015) was an American college and professional basketball coach. He coached three different professional teams in his career; the American Basketball Association's Spirits of St. Louis, and the NBA's Buffalo Braves and New Jersey Nets. MacKinnon also served as the Nets' general manager.

== Biography ==
MacKinnon was a three-sport athlete at McKinley Vocational High School in Buffalo, New York. He was an All-High choice in basketball in 1944, 1945, and 1946, and established a Yale Cup scoring record while pacing the Macks to the City Championship as a junior and senior. Bob excelled in football as well, as an All-High halfback and member of three City Championship teams. He won All-High honors in baseball while leading the Macks to the 1946 City Championship.

Although MacKinnon played baseball at Canisius College and captained the 1950 squad, his greatest success as a college athlete came in basketball. His honors included selection to the All-Western New York team in 1948–1950, to the All-Auditorium team in 1949–1950, and as a Sporting News Second-Team All American in 1950. In perhaps his greatest moment of individual distinction, MacKinnon edged out College of the Holy Cross's Bob Cousy as MVP of the Jesuit Game in 1949. MacKinnon is considered one of the most superb defenders and playmakers in Golden Griffin history. Following graduation, baseball beckoned, and MacKinnon signed with the Brooklyn Dodgers organization. However, a steady diet of cheap motels and long bus trips as a minor-leaguer led him back to his first passion, basketball.

Following a season as a player for the Syracuse Nationals of the National Basketball Association, MacKinnon returned to Buffalo to coach basketball at Canisius High School. He compiled a record of 36–2 over two seasons and was appointed coach of the Canisius College freshman squad. In 1959, MacKinnon was named head basketball coach and athletic director at Canisius College. At the time, he was the youngest coach in the NCAA. The program reached its peak a mere four years later, as the Golden Griffins posted a 19–7 record and made an appearance in the NIT Finals that earned MacKinnon Eastern Coach of the Year honors. He coached the Griffs for 13 seasons; during his tenure, his capabilities were recognized by his fellow coaches as they selected him to the National Invitation Tournament Selection Committee, the NCAA All-American Selection Committee, and the NCAA Rules Committee.

MacKinnon left Canisius in 1972, signing on with the Buffalo Braves as assistant coach and scout. Within three seasons, the Braves were a National Basketball Association power. He also coached during 1974–75 in the American Basketball Association, leading the Spirits of St. Louis to a stunning upset of the defending champion New York Nets in the semifinals of the 1975 ABA Playoffs. MacKinnon left the Spirits to be the player personnel director with the Braves because he wanted to back the perceived "sure thing" (with his family also being home in Buffalo), particularly with the shaky future of the ABA (which folded in 1976). His achievements in professional basketball were a fitting culmination to a career spent in service to the sport. He was recognized for his prowess as an athlete and coach by his induction into the Greater Buffalo Sports Hall of Fame in 1995.

MacKinnon has been married since 1955 to the former Norma Marie Fell. They have four daughters and one son. His son, Bob MacKinnon Jr., has coached in the NBA Development League with the Colorado 14ers, Idaho Stampede, and Los Angeles D-Fenders.

MacKinnon died in Williamsville, New York on July 7, 2015, at the age of 87.

== Head coaching record ==
=== NBA ===
Legend
Regular season	G	Games coached	W	Games won	L	Games lost	W–L %	Win–loss %
Playoffs	PG	Playoff games	PW	Playoff wins	PL	Playoff losses	PW–L %	Playoff win–loss %

Team	Year	G	W	L	W–L%	Finish	PG	PW	PL	PW–L%	Result
Buffalo	1976–77	7	3	4	.429	4th in Atlantic	—	—	—	—	Missed Playoffs
New Jersey	1980–81	47	12	35	.255	5th in Atlantic	—	—	—	—	Missed Playoffs
New Jersey	1987–88	39	10	29	.256	5th in Atlantic	—	—	—	—	Missed Playoffs
Career		93	25	68	.269		—	—	—	—	

=== ABA ===
Legend
Regular season	G	Games coached	W	Games won	L	Games lost	W–L %	Win–loss %
Playoffs	PG	Playoff games	PW	Playoff wins	PL	Playoff losses	PW–L %	Playoff win–loss %

Team	Year	G	W	L	W–L%	Finish	PG	PW	PL	PW–L%	Result
St. Louis	1974–75	84	32	52	.381	3rd in Eastern	10	5	5	.500	Lost in Division finals
Career		84	32	52	.381		10	5	5	.500	
