= Ed Middleton =

English cricketer (born 2000)

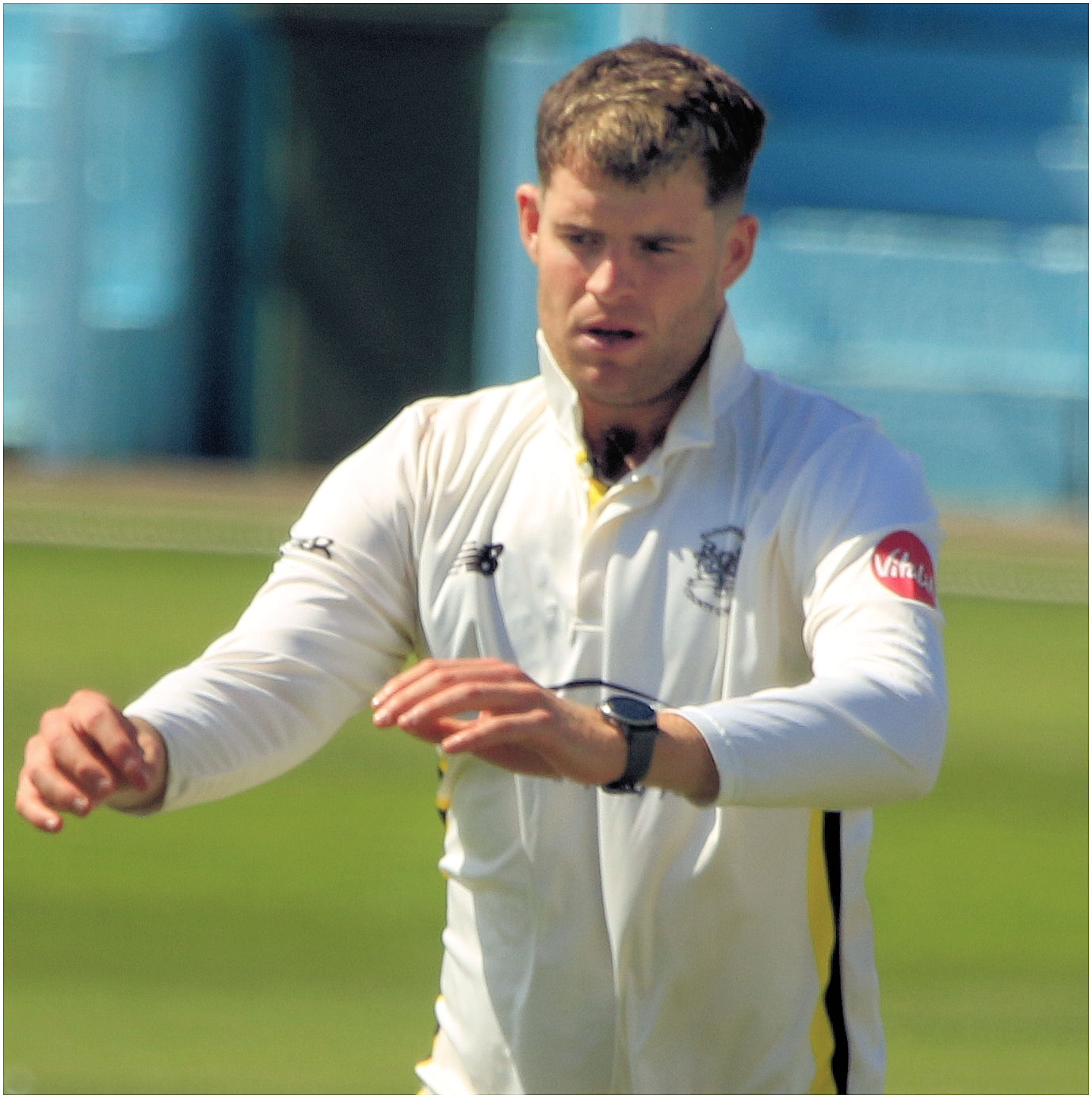
- Middleton in 2024

Personal information
- Full name: Edward William Osborne Middleton
- Born: 28 December 2000 (age 25); Exeter, Devon, England
- Batting: Right-handed
- Bowling: Right-arm leg-break

Domestic team information
- Years: Team
- 2023–2026: Gloucestershire
- First-class debut: 10 September 2023 Gloucestershire v Derbyshire
- List A debut: 2 August 2026 Gloucestershire v Warwickshire

Career statistics
Competition	FC	LA
Matches	12	4
Runs scored	301	13
Batting average	21.50	13.00
100s/50s	0/0	0/0
Top score	46	9*
Balls bowled	1,337	222
Wickets	20	5
Bowling average	39.80	41.60
5 wickets in innings	0	0
10 wickets in match	0	0
Best bowling	3/92	2/47
Catches/stumpings	4/–	1/–
- Source: ESPNcricinfo, 27 September 2026

Edward William Osborne Middleton (born 28 December 2000) is an English cricketer who has played for Gloucestershire as a right-hand batter and right-arm leg spin bowler. In May 2023, he signed a short term deal for Gloucestershire County Cricket Club. Later in December 2023, the contract extended for one year. He made his first-class debut for Gloucestershire on 10 September 2023, against Derbyshire in the 2023 County Championship. Middleton left Gloucestershire when his contract was not renewed in October 2026.
