= 1975–76 ABA season =

9th edition of the ABA championship

- League: American Basketball Association
- Sport: Basketball
- Duration: October 24, 1975 – May 13, 1976
- Games: 84 (83 for Virginia Squires)
- Teams: 9 (later 8 & 7)

Regular season
- Top seed: Denver Nuggets
- Season MVP: Julius Erving (New York)
- Top scorer: Julius Erving (New York)

Playoffs
- First semifinal champions: Denver Nuggets
- First semifinal runners-up: Kentucky Colonels
- Second semifinal champions: New York Nets
- Second semifinal runners-up: San Antonio Spurs

Finals
- Champions: New York Nets
- Runners-up: Denver Nuggets

ABA seasons
- ← 1974–75

The 1975–76 ABA season was the ninth and final season of the American Basketball Association. The shot clock was changed from 30 to 24 seconds in order to match the system that was utilized by the NBA. Former NBA player Dave DeBusschere was the league's newest commissioner after Tedd Munchak resigned, ultimately being its seventh and last one. This was also the only season that did not finish the season with the East-West division setup, as it was ultimately abandoned after the Utah Stars folded operations, being the third team to do so during the season. The NBA would later adopt the ABA's three-point shot, starting with the 1979–80 season, initially as a gimmick before making it a more permanent fixture to their league.

Prior to the start of the season, the Memphis Sounds relocated to Baltimore, Maryland, and briefly became the Baltimore Hustlers, then the Baltimore Claws. The Claws folded during the preseason in October after playing three exhibition games. The San Diego Conquistadors were replaced for the 1975–76 season by the San Diego Sails, but folded in November, followed by the Utah Stars in early December. The Virginia Squires folded in May following the end of the regular season, but before the conclusion of the 1976 ABA Playoffs, due to them being unable to make a $75,000 league assessment (and $125,000 in back pay for their players) one month before league merger talks with the NBA began.

The 1976 ABA All-Star Game saw the first place Denver Nuggets come from behind to defeat the ABA All-Stars 144–138 in Denver. The game saw the first ever Slam Dunk Contest, won by Julius Erving.

With the conclusion of the season, the June 1976 ABA-NBA merger saw the Denver Nuggets, Indiana Pacers, New York Nets, and San Antonio Spurs join the NBA, while the Kentucky Colonels and Spirits of St. Louis accepted deals to fold. The deal accepted by the Spirits' owners, Ozzie and Daniel Silna, would turn out to be quite lucrative, as they agreed to receive a seventh of the television revenue generated by each of the four newly added franchises in perpetuity.

Coaching changes
Offseason
Team	1974–75 coach	1975–76 coach
San Diego Sails	Beryl Shipley	Bill Musselman
Spirits of St. Louis	Bob MacKinnon	Rod Thorn
In-season
Team	Outgoing coach	Incoming coach
Spirits of St. Louis	Rod Thorn	Joe Mullaney
Virginia Squires	Al Bianchi; Mack Calvin (interim); Bill Musselman; Jack Ankerson (interim)	Mack Calvin (interim); Bill Musselman; Jack Ankerson (interim); Zelmo Beaty

== Teams ==
1975–76 American Basketball Association
Team	City	Arena	Capacity
Baltimore Claws	Baltimore, Maryland	Baltimore Civic Arena (Planned)	11,686
Denver Nuggets	Denver, Colorado	McNichols Sports Arena	16,700
Indiana Pacers	Indianapolis, Indiana	Market Square Arena	17,000
Kentucky Colonels	Louisville, Kentucky	Freedom Hall	16,664
New York Nets	Uniondale, New York	Nassau Veterans Memorial Coliseum	14,865
San Antonio Spurs	San Antonio, Texas	Hemisfair Arena	10,146
San Diego Sails	San Diego, California	San Diego Sports Arena	14,500
Spirits of St. Louis	St. Louis, Missouri	St. Louis Arena	18,006
Utah Stars	Salt Lake City, Utah	Salt Palace	12,166
Virginia Squires	Norfolk, Virginia; Hampton, Virginia; Richmond, Virginia	Old Dominion University Fieldhouse; Hampton Coliseum; Richmond Arena	5,200; 9,777; 6,000

=== Map of teams ===
ABA Teams

== Regular season ==
On April 19, 1976, the final ABA MVP award was given to Julius Erving. Erving received 32-of-35 votes from the media voting, with Bobby Jones, David Thompson, and James Silas garnering the remaining votes. Erving had won the scoring title (averaging 29.3 points per game) while averaging 11 rebounds a game (5th), and field goal percentage (.517, 8th best). He was the third pro basketball player to win three straight league MVPs after Bill Russell and Wilt Chamberlain.

== Final standings ==
Team	W	L	PCT.	GB
Denver Nuggets *	60	24	.714	—
**New York Nets** *	55	29	.655	5
San Antonio Spurs *	50	34	.595	10
Kentucky Colonels *	46	38	.548	14
Indiana Pacers *	39	45	.464	21
Spirits of St. Louis	35	49	.417	25
Virginia Squires †	15	68	.181	44
San Diego Sails †	3	8	.273	—
Utah Stars †	4	12	.250	—
Baltimore Claws †	0	0	.000	—

Asterisk (*) denotes playoff team
† did not survive the end of the season.

Bold – ABA champions

== Playoffs ==
The 1976 ABA Playoffs opened with the Kentucky Colonels defeating the Indiana Pacers 2 games to 1 in the quarterfinals. The Colonels then lost a seven-game semifinal series to the #1 seeded Denver Nuggets, 4 games to 3. The other semifinal saw the New York Nets outlast the San Antonio Spurs 4 games to 3. In the finals the Nets beat the Nuggets, 4 games to 2.

Quarterfinals
**# 4**	**Kentucky Colonels**	**2**
# 5	Indiana Pacers	1

Semi-Finals
**# 1**	**Denver Nuggets**	**4**
# 4	Kentucky Colonels	3
**# 2**	**New York Nets**	**4**
# 3	San Antonio Spurs	3

Championship Series
# 1	Denver Nuggets	2
**# 2**	**New York Nets**	**4**

== Awards and honors ==
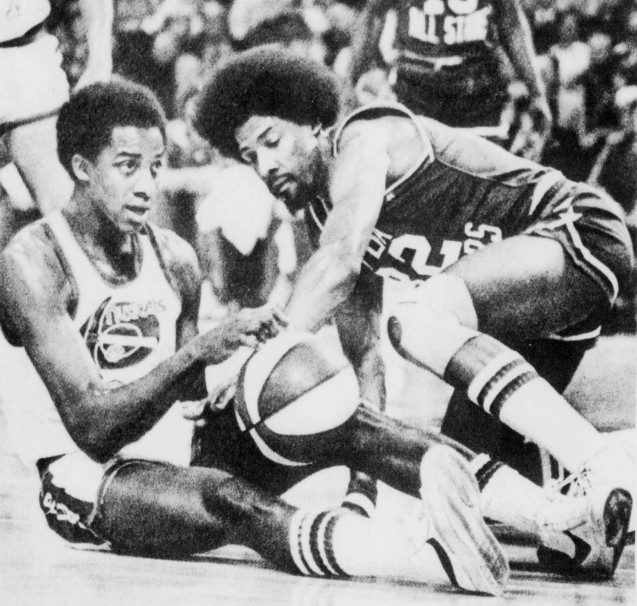
David Thompson (Denver) and Julius Erving (New York) at the 1976 ABA All-Star Game

- ABA Most Valuable Player Award: Julius Erving, New York Nets (3rd selection)
- Rookie of the Year: David Thompson, Denver Nuggets
- Coach of the Year: Larry Brown, Denver Nuggets (3rd selection)
- Playoffs MVP: Julius Erving, New York Nets (2nd selection)
- All-Star Game MVP: David Thompson, Denver Nuggets
- Executive of the Year: Carl Scheer, Denver Nuggets (3rd selection)
- **All-ABA First Team**
  - Julius Erving, New York Nets (4th First Team selection, 5th overall selection)
  - Billy Knight, Indiana Pacers
  - Artis Gilmore, Kentucky Colonels (5th selection)
  - James Silas, San Antonio Spurs (1st First Team selection, 2nd overall selection)
  - Ralph Simpson, Denver Nuggets (1st First Team selection, 3rd overall selection)
- **All-ABA Second Team**
  - David Thompson, Denver Nuggets
  - Bobby Jones, Denver Nuggets
  - Dan Issel, Denver Nuggets (4th Second Team selection, 5th overall selection)
  - Don Buse, Indiana Pacers
  - George Gervin, San Antonio Spurs (2nd selection)
- **All-Defensive Team**
  - Don Buse (2nd selection), Indiana Pacers
  - Julius Erving, New York Nets
  - Artis Gilmore (4th selection), Kentucky Colonels
  - Bobby Jones (2nd selection), Denver Nuggets
  - Brian Taylor (2nd selection), New York Nets
- **All-Rookie Team**
  - Luther Burden, Virginia Squires
  - M. L. Carr, Spirits of St. Louis
  - Kim Hughes, New York Nets
  - Mark Olberding, San Diego Sails & San Antonio Spurs
  - David Thompson, Denver Nuggets
