= 1974–75 ABA season =

- League: American Basketball Association
- Sport: Basketball
- Duration: October 18, 1974 – May 22, 1975
- Games: 84
- Teams: 10

Regular season
- Top seed: Denver Nuggets
- Season MVP: Julius Erving (New York) and George McGinnis, (Indiana)
- Top scorer: George McGinnis (Indiana)

Playoffs
- Eastern champions: Kentucky Colonels
- Eastern runners-up: Spirits of St. Louis
- Western champions: Indiana Pacers
- Western runners-up: Denver Nuggets

Finals
- Champions: Kentucky Colonels
- Runners-up: Indiana Pacers

ABA seasons
- ← 1973–74 1975–76 →

The 1974–75 ABA season was the eighth season of the American Basketball Association. The Kentucky Colonels won the 1975 ABA Championship after winning the Eastern Division; the Denver Nuggets won the Western Division. Julius Erving and George McGinnis shared the league's MVP award.

Coaching changes
Offseason
Team	1973–74 coach	1974–75 coach
Denver Nuggets	Alex Hannum	Larry Brown
Kentucky Colonels	Babe McCarthy	Hubie Brown
Memphis Sounds	Butch van Breda Kolff	Joe Mullaney
Spirits of St. Louis	Larry Brown	Bob MacKinnon
San Diego Conquistadors	Wilt Chamberlain	Alex Groza
Utah Stars	Joe Mullaney	Bucky Buckwalter
In-season
Team	Outgoing coach	Incoming coach
San Antonio Spurs	Tom Nissalke	Bob Bass
San Diego Conquistadors	Alex Groza	Beryl Shipley
Utah Stars	Bucky Buckwalter	Tom Nissalke

== Preseason ==
Prior to the start of the season the Eastern Division changed as the Memphis Tams gave way to the Memphis Sounds and the Carolina Cougars were bought by Ozzie and Daniel Silna and relocated out of the state of North Carolina to stay specifically in St. Louis, Missouri to become the Spirits of St. Louis. The Western Division remained unchanged save for the Denver Rockets renaming themselves the Denver Nuggets in advanced preparations of sorts for Denver wanting to avoid any troubles with their team name once a potentian ABA-NBA merger occurred due to the NBA already having the Houston Rockets (formerly known as the San Diego Rockets) as a team name at around the same time.

The ABA and NBA continued playing preseason exhibition games between their teams. The ABA won 16 of the 23 games, to 7 wins for the NBA. Among those games was the Pacers' first game in Market Square Arena in which they defeated the Milwaukee Bucks 118–115 before a standing room only crowd of 17,287; Bob Dandridge had 46 points and Kareem Abdul-Jabbar 26 for the Bucks.

== Regular season ==
On February 14, 1975, Julius Erving of the New York Nets scored a team-record 63 points against the San Diego Conquistadors in a quadruple-overtime game, which was both the longest game in league history at three hours and the highest-scoring game that resulted in San Diego prevailing 176–166. The 176–166 final score that the Conquistadors and Nets had would have been considered the newest record for the list of highest-scoring NBA games had this game occurred in the NBA at the time, with it remaining the record for the highest-scoring game in professional basketball history until December 13, 1983 when the Detroit Pistons (the team that won the lowest-scoring game in the NBA's history back when they were the Fort Wayne Pistons) defeated the Denver Nuggets (another team that has its roots in the ABA) 186–184 in triple-overtime out in the NBA. The 166 points the Nets scored that night would still be the franchise's highest mark for points scored in one game as of 2025, with its NBA record occurring on December 7, 2006 when the since-rebranded New Jersey Nets (now known as the Brooklyn Nets) would lose to the Phoenix Suns 161–157 in double-overtime.

The 8th ABA All-Star Game was played on January 28, 1975, in San Antonio, Texas. 10,449 attended. The East was coached by Kevin Loughery of the New York Nets and the West was coached by Larry Brown of the Denver Nuggets. The East won 151–124; Freddie Lewis of the Spirits of St. Louis was the game's MVP after scoring 26 points.

The Denver Nuggets posted the ABA's best record of the season, winning the Western Division with a record of 65–19 (.774). That record was second best in ABA history, behind only the 1971–72 Kentucky Colonels' mark of 68–16 (.810). The 1974–75 Nuggets also finished second in ABA history behind the 1971–72 Colonels for team scoring difference, outscoring their opponents by an average of 8.40 points per game to the 1971–72 Colonels' 8.98 points.

In the Eastern Division the Kentucky Colonels won 22 of their last 25 regular season games to tie the New York Nets for first place in the Eastern Division at 58–26 (.690).

== Teams ==
1974–75 American Basketball Association
Division	Team	City	Arena	Capacity
Eastern	Kentucky Colonels	Louisville, Kentucky	Freedom Hall	16,664
Eastern	Memphis Sounds	Memphis, Tennessee	Mid-South Coliseum	10,085
Eastern	New York Nets	Uniondale, New York	Nassau Veterans Memorial Coliseum	13,571
Eastern	Spirits of St. Louis	St. Louis, Missouri	St. Louis Arena	18,006
Eastern	Virginia Squires	Old Dominion University Fieldhouse; Hampton Coliseum; Richmond Arena; Salem Civic Center; Roanoke Civic Center	Norfolk, Virginia; Hampton, Virginia; Richmond, Virginia; Salem, Virginia; Roanoke, Virginia	5,200; 9,777; 6,000; 6,820; 9,828
Western	Denver Nuggets	Denver, Colorado	Denver Auditorium Arena	6,841
Western	Indiana Pacers	Indianapolis, Indiana	Market Square Arena	17,000
Western	San Antonio Spurs	San Antonio, Texas	Hemisfair Arena	10,146
Western	San Diego Conquistadors	San Diego, California	San Diego Sports Arena	14,500
Western	Utah Stars	Salt Lake City, Utah	Salt Palace	12,166

=== Map of teams ===
Eastern Division Western Division

== Final standings ==
=== Eastern Division ===
Team	W	L	PCT.	GB
**Kentucky Colonels** *	58	26	.690	—
New York Nets *	58	26	.690	—
Spirits of St. Louis *	32	52	.381	26
Memphis Sounds *	27	57	.321	31
Virginia Squires	15	69	.179	43

=== Western Division ===
Team	W	L	PCT.	GB
Denver Nuggets *	65	19	.774	—
San Antonio Spurs *	51	33	.607	14
Indiana Pacers *	45	39	.536	20
Utah Stars *	38	46	.452	27
San Diego Conquistadors	31	53	.369	34

Asterisk (*) denotes playoff team

Bold – ABA champions

== Playoffs ==
The 1975 ABA Playoffs began with a one-game series between the Kentucky Colonels and New York Nets for first place in the Eastern Division. The game was played on April 4, 1975, at Freedom Hall in Louisville, Kentucky. The Colonels won, 108 to 99.

The Colonels then defeated the Memphis Sounds 4 games to 1 in the Eastern Division semifinals, while the Nets lost to the Spirits of St. Louis in the other Eastern Division semifinal, 4 games to 1. The Colonels then defeated the Spirits in the Eastern Division finals 4 games to 1.

In the Western Division the first place Denver Nuggets won their semifinal round against the Utah Stars, 4 games to 2, and the third seeded Indiana Pacers upset the #2 seed San Antonio Spurs 4 games to 2 in the other Western Division semifinal. The Pacers pulled another upset in the Western Division finals, upending the Nuggets 4 games to 3.

In the 1975 ABA Finals the Colonels defeated the Pacers 4 games to 1 to claim the league championship.

Division Semifinals
**1**	**Denver Nuggets**	**4**
4	Utah Stars	2
**Western Division**
**3**	**Indiana Pacers**	**4**
2	San Antonio Spurs	2
**1**	**Kentucky Colonels**	**4**
4	Memphis Sounds	1
**Eastern Division**
**3**	**Spirits of St. Louis**	**4**
2	New York Nets	1

Division Finals
1	Denver Nuggets	3
**3**	**Indiana Pacers**	**4**
**1**	**Kentucky Colonels**	**4**
3	Spirits of St. Louis	1

ABA Finals
W3	Indiana Pacers	1
**E1**	**Kentucky Colonels**	**4**

== Awards and honors ==
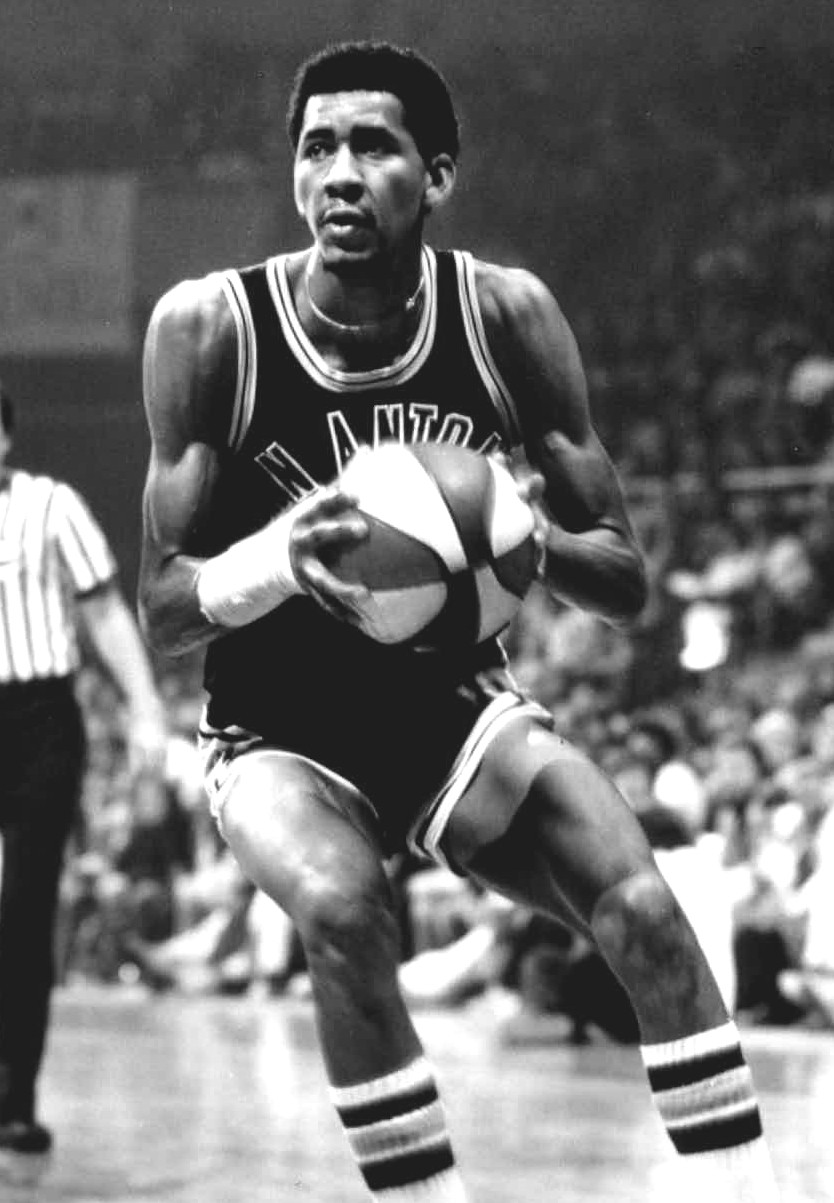
George "Iceman" Gervin of the San Antonio Spurs, c. 1975

On April 7, 1975, the league's MVP award for the 1974–75 season was awarded jointly to Julius Erving of the New York Nets and George McGinnis of the Indiana Pacers. Both players had received 11 votes in the balloting by sports writers and broadcasters (three from each of the ten cities in the league), with the remaining votes going to Mack Calvin (six) and Bobby Jones (two) of the Denver Nuggets.

McGinnis was also the league's leading scorer at 29.78 points per game (2,353 points in 79 games). Erving was second at 27.89 points per game.

Swen Nater of the San Antonio Spurs led the league in rebounding, averaging 16.40 per game. Artis Gilmore of the Kentucky Colonels was second with 16.20 per game, down from 18.31 the season before.

Mack Calvin of the Denver Nuggets set second best ABA record for free throw percentage, hitting 475 of 530 attempts for an 89.622% average.

Artis Gilmore was named Most Valuable Player of the 1975 ABA Playoffs. Gilmore scored 28 points and grabbed 31 rebounds in the final game of the Finals and in Game 3 in Indianapolis Gilmore scored 41 points and nabbed 28 rebounds.

- ABA Most Valuable Player Award: Julius Erving, New York Nets & George McGinnis, Indiana Pacers
- Rookie of the Year: Marvin Barnes, Spirits of St. Louis
- Coach of the Year: Larry Brown, Denver Nuggets
- Playoffs MVP: Artis Gilmore, Kentucky Colonels
- All-Star Game MVP: Freddie Lewis, Spirits of St. Louis
- Executive of the Year: Carl Scheer, Denver Nuggets
- **All-ABA First Team**
  - Julius Erving, New York Nets (3rd First Team selection, 4th overall selection)
  - George McGinnis, Indiana Pacers (2nd First Team selection, 3rd overall selection)
  - Artis Gilmore, Kentucky Colonels (4th selection)
  - Mack Calvin, Denver Nuggets (3rd First Team selection, 4th overall selection)
  - Ron Boone, Utah Stars (1st First Team selection, 2nd overall selection)
- **All-ABA Second Team**
  - Marvin Barnes, Spirits of St. Louis
  - George Gervin, San Antonio Spurs
  - Swen Nater, San Antonio Spurs (2nd selection)
  - Brian Taylor, New York Nets
  - James Silas, San Antonio Spurs
- **All-Defensive Team**
  - Don Buse, Indiana Pacers
  - Artis Gilmore (3rd selection), Kentucky Colonels
  - Bobby Jones, Denver Nuggets
  - Wil Jones, Kentucky Colonels
  - Brian Taylor, New York Nets
- **All-Rookie Team**
  - Marvin Barnes, Spirits of St. Louis
  - Gus Gerard, Spirits of St. Louis
  - Bobby Jones, Denver Nuggets
  - Billy Knight, Indiana Pacers
  - Moses Malone, Utah Stars
