= Gus Gerard =

American basketball player (born 1953)

Personal information
- Born: July 27, 1953 (age 73) Uniontown, Pennsylvania, U.S.
- Listed height: 6 ft 8 in (2.03 m)
- Listed weight: 200 lb (91 kg)

Career information
- High school: Laurel Highlands (Uniontown, Pennsylvania)
- College: Virginia (1972–1974)
- NBA draft: 1975: 3rd round, 50th overall pick
- Drafted by: Portland Trail Blazers
- Playing career: 1974–1981
- Position: Small forward
- Number: 12, 22

Career history
- 1974–1975: Spirits of St. Louis
- 1975–1976: Denver Nuggets
- 1976–1977: Buffalo Braves
- 1977–1978: Detroit Pistons
- 1978–1980: Kansas City Kings
- 1981: San Antonio Spurs

Career highlights
- ABA All-Star (1976); ABA All-Rookie First Team (1975); Second-team All-ACC (1974)

Career ABA and NBA statistics
- Points: 3,765 (8.4 ppg)
- Rebounds: 1,811 (4.1 rpg)
- Assists: 560 (1.3 apg)
- Stats at NBA.com
- Stats at Basketball Reference
Medals
Representing United States
Men's basketball
FIBA World Championship
Bronze medal – third place	1974 Puerto Rico	Team competition

Daniel James "Gus" Gerard (born July 27, 1953) is an American former professional basketball player. He played for the Carolina Cougars and Spirits of St. Louis and Denver Nuggets of the American Basketball Association (ABA) and the Denver Nuggets, Buffalo Braves, Detroit Pistons, Kansas City Kings and San Antonio Spurs of the National Basketball Association (NBA).

== Career ==
=== College ===
Gerard played college basketball at the University of Virginia.

=== NBA ===
Gerard was drafted by the Portland Trail Blazers in the third round (14th pick, 50th overall) of the 1975 NBA draft. He was on the 1974–75 ABA All-Rookie First Team and made the 1976 ABA All Star Team. He played in all 84 games of his rookie season.

Gerard's best NBA season came in 1976–77 when he averaged 10 points a game for the Denver Nuggets. He finally retired the NBA after the 1980–81 season.

Gerard's ABA and NBA careers were hampered by drug problems; after leaving professional basketball Gerard became a licensed chemical dependency counselor and was involved in a program called Bouncing Back, in which athletes like himself, former Spirits of St. Louis teammate Marvin Barnes and former NBA player Dirk Minniefield travel to schools and businesses, sharing their stories about addiction and recovery.
