= 1976 ABA All-Star Game =

Exhibition basketball game

Denver	ABA All-Stars
144	138
	1	2	3	4	Total
Denver	32	23	37	52	144
ABA All-Stars	31	25	41	41	138
- Date: January 27, 1976
- Venue: McNichols Sports Arena, Denver, Colorado
- MVP: David Thompson
- Referees: Norm Drucker; Ed Middleton
- Attendance: 17,798

The 1976 ABA All Star Game was the ninth and final American Basketball Association All-Star Game, played at McNichols Arena in Denver, Colorado, on January 27, 1976. This time, the league abandoned the usual East vs. West format it used from the 1967–68 season onward and instead had the league's first-place team at the All Star break face off against a team of ABA All Stars. The change was decided given the league's reduction from ten to seven teams and from two divisions to only one. By the time the ABA entered the All-Star break, the Denver Nuggets were in first place within the entire league, which was convenient for the ABA and secretly what they were hoping for as the Nuggets had also been selected to host the game at the McNichols Arena back when the ABA was projected to have ten competitive teams in two divisions yet again. Kevin Loughery of the New York Nets coached the All-Stars while Larry Brown led the Denver Nuggets. This was the second year in a row that Loughery and Brown coached against each other in the ABA All-Star Game. (The Nuggets went on to finish the regular season in first place at 60-24 (.714), but after beating the Kentucky Colonels 4 games to 3 in the ABA Semifinals the Nuggets lost in the 1976 ABA Finals to the New York Nets, 4 games to 2.)

The 12 All-Stars originally selected included the Nuggets' David Thompson, Bobby Jones, and Ralph Simpson. Coaches replaced them on the all-star squad with Maurice Lucas of Kentucky, Larry Kenon of the San Antonio Spurs, and Don Buse of the Indiana Pacers.

Pre-game entertainment was provided by Glen Campbell and Charlie Rich.

Halftime of the All Star Game saw the first-ever Slam Dunk Contest, which was won by Julius Erving of the New York Nets (who took off from the free throw line for one of his dunks) over Denver's Thompson, Artis Gilmore of Kentucky, and both George Gervin and Larry Kenon of San Antonio. The National Basketball Association later adopted the Slam Dunk Contest as part of its All-Star Game events starting in 1984 (also hosted by the Denver Nuggets). Denver's 52 fourth quarter points was a record for an ABA All-Star Game and capped a 144–138 comeback win. It was the highest-scoring game in ABA All-Star history. Thompson was named the MVP.

This was the final ABA All Star Game, due to the ABA–NBA merger in June 1976.

== All-Stars ==
Player, Team	MIN	FGM	FGA	3PM	3PA	FTM	FTA	REB	AST	STL	BLK	PFS	PTS
Brian Taylor, NYN	29	3	9	0	1	0	0	4	8	0	0	3	6
Artis Gilmore, KEN	27	5	7	0	0	4	6	7	1	0	0	6	14
Julius Erving, NYN	25	9	12	0	1	5	7	7	5	0	0	4	23
James Silas, SAS	23	6	10	0	0	8	8	0	5	0	0	6	20
Billy Knight, IND	23	9	14	0	1	2	2	10	2	0	0	3	20
Billy Paultz, SAS	20	4	6	0	0	2	2	2	1	0	0	1	10
Larry Kenon, SAS	20	5	7	0	0	0	0	6	2	0	0	5	10
Ron Boone, SSL	16	5	11	0	0	0	0	3	2	0	0	1	10
George Gervin, SAS	16	3	13	1	2	1	2	6	1	0	0	1	8
Maurice Lucas, KEN	14	2	5	0	0	1	1	5	3	0	0	1	5
Don Buse, IND	14	2	5	1	2	0	0	1	3	0	0	0	5
Marvin Barnes, SSL	13	3	5	0	0	1	1	0	1	0	0	3	7
Team Totals	240	56	104	2	7	24	29	51	34	0	0	34	138

== Denver Nuggets ==
Player	MIN	FGM	FGA	3PM	3PA	FTM	FTA	REB	AST	STL	BLK	PFS	PTS
Ralph Simpson	37	8	15	0	0	3	3	7	5	0	0	0	19
David Thompson	34	9	18	0	0	11	13	8	2	0	0	4	29
Dan Issel	31	6	16	0	0	7	9	9	5	0	0	3	19
Bobby Jones	29	8	12	0	0	8	11	10	3	0	0	2	24
Claude Terry	25	5	12	1	3	3	5	3	3	0	0	2	14
Chuck Williams	22	2	6	0	0	3	5	1	4	0	0	2	7
Byron Beck	20	6	11	0	0	2	2	4	0	0	0	3	14
Gus Gerard	17	5	14	0	0	2	2	9	1	0	0	5	12
Monte Towe	11	1	3	0	0	0	0	0	2	0	0	0	2
Roger Brown	9	2	2	0	0	0	0	3	3	0	0	1	4
James Foster	5	0	3	0	0	0	0	1	0	0	0	1	0
Team Totals	240	52	112	1	3	39	50	55	28	0	0	23	144

== Score by period ==
Score by Periods:	1	2	3	4	Final
Denver	32	23	37	52	144
All-Stars	31	25	41	41	138

- Halftime — All-Stars, 56–55
- Third Quarter — All-Stars, 97–92
- Officials: Norm Drucker and Ed Middleton
- Attendance: 17,798
