= Jimmy Foster (basketball) =

American basketball player (born 1951)

Personal information
- Born: December 16, 1951 (age 74) Jersey City, New Jersey, U.S.
- Listed height: 6 ft 1 in (1.85 m)
- Listed weight: 175 lb (79 kg)

Career information
- High school: Hoboken (Hoboken, New Jersey)
- College: Becker (1970–1972); UConn (1972–1974)
- NBA draft: 1974: 4th round, 57th overall pick
- Drafted by: Cleveland Cavaliers
- Position: Point guard
- Number: 15

Career history
- 1974–1975: Spirits of St. Louis
- 1975–1976: Denver Nuggets

Career highlights
- ABA All-Star (1976)
- Stats at Basketball Reference

James Foster (born December 16, 1951) is a retired American basketball player. He was a 6'1", 175 lb guard born in Jersey City, New Jersey and attended the University of Connecticut and played in the American Basketball Association (ABA) from 1974 to 1976 with the Spirits of St. Louis and Denver Nuggets.

White was selected in the 1974 NBA draft by the Cleveland Cavaliers and in the 1974 ABA draft by the Carolina Cougars.
