= David Thompson (basketball) =

American basketball player (born 1954)

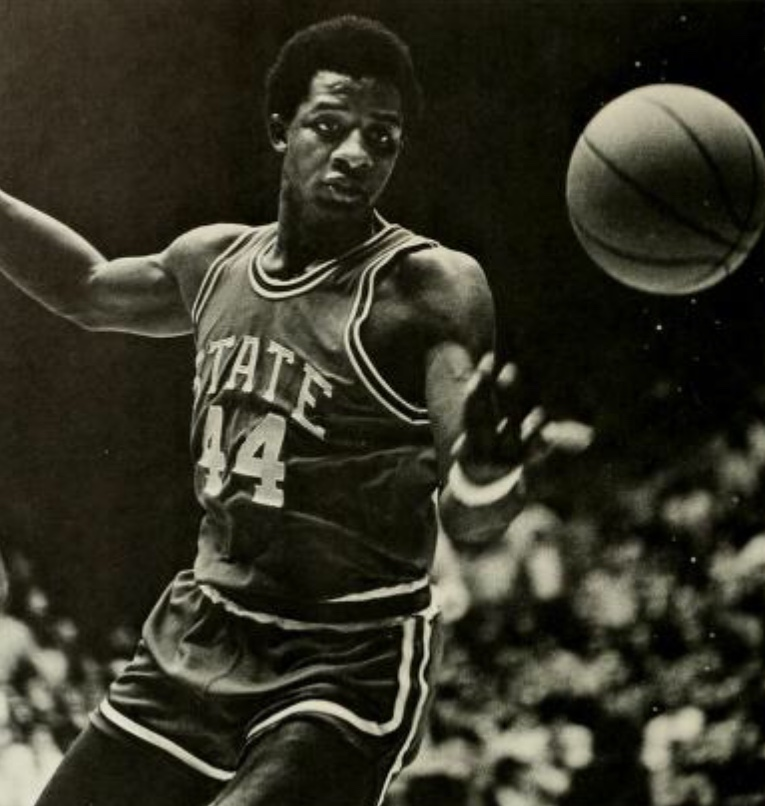
- Thompson with NC State in 1974

Personal information
- Born: July 13, 1954 (age 72) Shelby, North Carolina, U.S.
- Listed height: 6 ft 4 in (1.93 m)
- Listed weight: 195 lb (88 kg)

Career information
- High school: Crest (Shelby, North Carolina)
- College: NC State (1972–1975)
- NBA draft: 1975: 1st round, 1st overall pick
- Drafted by: Atlanta Hawks
- Playing career: 1975–1984
- Position: Shooting guard
- Number: 33, 44

Career history
- 1975–1982: Denver Nuggets
- 1982–1984: Seattle SuperSonics

Career highlights
- 4× NBA All-Star (1977–1979, 1983); NBA All-Star Game MVP (1979); 2× All-NBA First Team (1977, 1978); ABA All-Star (1976); ABA All-Star Game MVP (1976); All-ABA Second Team (1976); ABA Rookie of the Year (1976); ABA All-Rookie First Team (1976); ABA All-Time Team; No. 33 retired by Denver Nuggets; NCAA champion (1974); NCAA Final Four Most Outstanding Player (1974); 2× National college player of the year (1974, 1975); 3× Consensus first-team All-American (1973–1975); 2× ACC Athlete of the Year (1973, 1975); 3× ACC Player of the Year (1973–1975); 3× First-team All-ACC (1973–1975); No. 44 retired by NC State Wolfpack

Career ABA and NBA statistics
- Points: 13,422 (22.7 ppg)
- Rebounds: 2,446 (4.1 rpg)
- Assists: 1,939 (3.3 apg)
- Stats at NBA.com
- Stats at Basketball Reference
- Basketball Hall of Fame
- Collegiate Basketball Hall of Fame

David O'Neil Thompson (born July 13, 1954), commonly known by the nickname "Skywalker", is an American former professional basketball player. He played with the Denver Nuggets of both the American Basketball Association (ABA) and National Basketball Association (NBA), as well as the Seattle SuperSonics of the NBA before drug problems cut short his career. He was previously a star in college for North Carolina State, leading the Wolfpack to its first NCAA championship in 1974. Thompson is one of the eleven players to score 70 or more points in an NBA game. He was inducted into the Naismith Basketball Hall of Fame in 1996.

Thompson was known for his exceptional leaping ability that enabled him to become one of the game's premier dunkers in the 1970s and earned him the nickname of "Skywalker". Michael Jordan said, "The whole meaning of vertical leap began with David Thompson." Bill Walton described Thompson as "Michael Jordan, Kobe Bryant, Tracy McGrady, and LeBron James rolled into one".

== High school career ==
Thompson attended Crest Senior High School and played for the school's varsity basketball team for four years. He starred in the North Carolina Coaches Association's East-West All-Star Basketball Game in 1971. Thompson is a first cousin of Alvin Gentry, both growing up in Shelby, North Carolina.

== College career ==
Thompson led North Carolina State University to an undefeated season (27–0) in 1973, but the Wolfpack was banned from post-season play that year due to NCAA rules violations involving the recruiting of Thompson. He then led the Wolfpack to a 30–1 season and the NCAA Men's Division I Basketball Championship in 1974. In the semifinal game NCSU defeated the reigning national champions, UCLA, in double overtime. In the championship game they won easily over Marquette 76–64. His nickname was "Skywalker" because of his incredible vertical leap. The alley-oop pass, now a staple of today's high-flying, above-the-rim game, was "invented" by Thompson and his NC State teammate Monte Towe, and first used as an integral part of the offense by NC State coach Norm Sloan to take advantage of Thompson's leaping ability.

NC State's game against the nationally 4th-ranked University of Maryland Terrapins in the 1974 ACC Tournament finale, in an era in which only conference champions were invited to the NCAA tournament, is considered one of the best college basketball games of all time. Thompson and teammate Tommy Burleson led the #1-ranked Wolfpack to a 103–100 win in overtime, in a game played with no shot clock and no three point field goal. Maryland shot 63% from the field for the game, and lost. Thompson and the Wolfpack would go on to win the national championship that year. Maryland's exclusion from the NCAA Tournament due to the loss, despite their high national ranking, would lead to the expansion of the NCAA Tournament the very next season to include teams other than the league champions.

Thompson is considered one of the greatest players in the history of the Atlantic Coast Conference, among such talents as Michael Jordan, Ralph Sampson, Tim Duncan, Christian Laettner and Tyler Hansbrough.

Thompson played basketball while the slam dunk was outlawed from 1967 to 1977 by the "Lew Alcindor" rule. In 1975, playing his final home game at NC State against UNC-Charlotte, late in the second half Thompson on a breakaway received a long pass from a teammate, resulting in the first and only dunk of his collegiate career, a goal that was promptly disallowed by a technical foul.

Thompson's number 44 remains the lone number retired by the school in men's basketball.

In 2023, Thompson became the first player to have a statue outside Reynolds Coliseum.

Season	Points/G	Rebounds/G	FG %
1972–73	24.7	8.1	.569
1973–74	26.0	7.9	.547
1974–75	29.9	8.2	.546

== Professional career ==
=== Denver Nuggets (1975–1982) ===
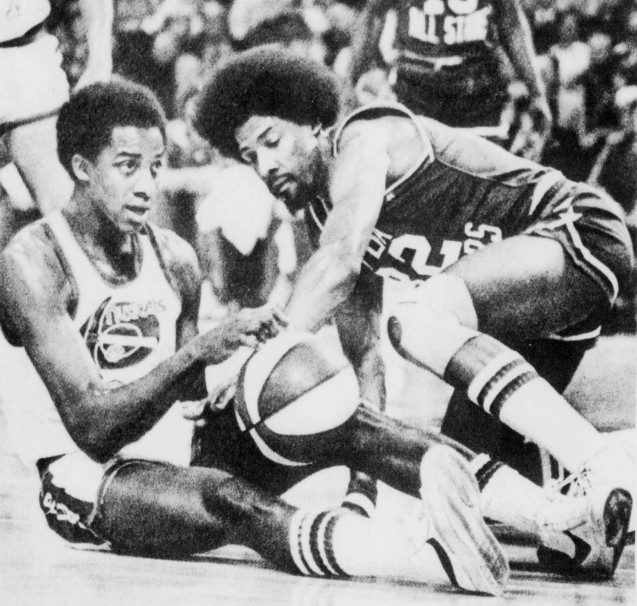
Thompson (left) and Julius Erving, 1976 ABA All-Star Game, January 27, 1976

Thompson was the No. 1 draft pick of both the American Basketball Association (Virginia Squires) and the National Basketball Association (Atlanta Hawks) in the 1975 drafts of both leagues. He eventually signed with the ABA's Denver Nuggets. He finished runner-up to Julius Erving in the first-ever Slam-Dunk Competition, held at the 1976 ABA All-Star Game in Denver, but was named MVP of the ABA All-Star Game. As a prize, he received a credenza television set.

That season, the Nuggets finished 60–24, and beat the Kentucky Colonels in a hard-fought seven-game series to advance to the 1976 ABA Finals. In the finals, the Nuggets faced Erving and the New York Nets, and Thompson averaged 28.3 points and 6.3 rebounds per game in a tightly contested 4–2 series loss, including an almost-heroic 42 point effort to lead all scorers in a narrow 112–106 Game 6 loss. After the season ended, Thompson was awarded the 1976 ABA Rookie of the Year award. When Alvan Adams accepted the 1976 NBA Rookie of the Year Award, he thanked Thompson for choosing to play in the ABA.

Following the 1976 ABA–NBA merger, Thompson continued with the Nuggets. He went on to make the NBA All-Star Game four times. On April 9, 1978, the last day of that year's regular season, Thompson scored 73 points against the Detroit Pistons in an effort to win the NBA scoring title, which he lost by less than 0.1 points per game to the San Antonio Spurs' George Gervin, who scored 63 points in a game played later that same day.

After the 1977–78 season, Thompson signed a then-record contract extension that paid him $4 million over five years. After a foot injury caused him to miss the final 36 games of the 1979–80 season, he returned to average 25.5 points in 77 games the next year.

=== Seattle SuperSonics (1982–1984) ===
After Thompson's scoring average dipped to 14.9 points in 1981–82, the Nuggets traded him to the Seattle SuperSonics on June 17, 1982 for Bill Hanzlik and a draft pick.

Thompson experienced somewhat of a career revival during his first year in Seattle, making the 1982–83 All-Star game after averaging 15.9 points, 3.6 rebounds, and 3 assists, which were comparatively low totals when contrasted with the stats from his prime in Denver. During that year's playoffs, in his last postseason appearance, Thompson averaged just 12 points in a two-game series loss to the Portland Trail Blazers. The next year, Thompson missed nearly all of the 1983–84 season due to drug rehabilitation. Following his release, the Sonics resigned him for the remaining nineteen games of the 1983–84 season, in which he averaged a career low of 12.6 points before an off-court 1984 knee injury forced him into retirement.

== Drug addiction ==
Thompson's substance abuse problems began due to feelings of "loneliness and isolation" after his 1979–80 foot injury. They first became public after his erratic debut season in Seattle, after which he checked into a Denver rehabilitation facility in 1983. His career-ending 1984 knee injury resulted from him being shoved down a stairwell during a fight at Studio 54, and later factored into his failed 1985 tryout with the Indiana Pacers, after which he was arrested that night for public intoxication. By 1986, Thompson was reportedly spending $1,000 daily on cocaine, for which he checked into rehab that year in Kirkland, Washington. After he was sentenced to 180 days in jail in 1987 for assaulting his wife, Thompson became a committed Christian and reorganized his life.

== Post-playing career ==
Thompson worked with the Charlotte Hornets' community-relations department in 1990, and, at age 37, played in the Legends Classic during the 1992 NBA All-Star Weekend, but he was one of two participants (with Norm Nixon) who were taken off the court on stretchers with serious leg injuries. This resulted in the league retiring the event after the 1993 festivities.

Thompson returned to North Carolina State in 2003 to complete his degree in sociology. The next year, he shot an autobiographical film titled Skywalker. He was inducted into the Basketball Hall of Fame on May 6, 1996, and introduced Michael Jordan for the latter's 2009 induction. He currently works as a motivational speaker and participates in events with the Hornets and Denver Nuggets.

== Personal life ==
Thompson and his wife Cathy had two daughters, Erika and Brooke. He shared the stage with his daughter Erika when the two graduated together on December 17, 2003, after he returned to earn his sociology degree. Brooke was a participant on Global GUTS. Cathy died in August 2016.

== Career statistics ==
Thompson's first professional year (1975–1976) was spent in the ABA. The rest of his career he played in the NBA due to the ABA–NBA merger in 1976.

=== Regular season ===
**Bold**	Denotes career highs

Season	Team	GP	GS	MIN	PTS	REB	AST	STL	BLK	FG %
1975–76	Denver (ABA)	**83**	—	37.4	26.0	**6.3**	3.7	**1.6**	**1.2**	.515
1976–77	Denver	82	—	36.6	25.9	4.1	4.1	1.4	0.6	.507
1977–78	Denver	80	—	**37.8**	**27.2**	4.9	**4.5**	1.2	**1.2**	.521
1978–79	Denver	76	—	35.1	24.0	3.6	3.0	0.9	1.1	.512
1979–80	Denver	39	—	31.8	21.5	4.5	3.2	1.0	1.0	.468
1980–81	Denver	77	—	34.0	25.5	3.7	3.0	0.7	0.8	.506
1981–82	Denver	61	5	34.0	14.9	2.4	1.9	0.6	0.5	.486
1982–83	Seattle	75	**64**	20.4	15.9	3.6	3.0	0.6	0.4	.481
1983–84	Seattle	19	0	28.7	12.6	2.3	0.7	0.5	0.7	**.539**
Career		592	69	32.8	22.7	4.1	3.3	1.0	0.9	.505

=== Playoffs ===
Year	Team	GP	MIN	PTS	REB	AST	STL	BLK	FG %
1976	Denver (ABA)	**13**	39.1	26.4	6.4	3.0	1.2	0.4	.536
1977	Denver	6	39.5	24.7	5.2	**4.0**	**1.5**	0.7	.463
1978	Denver	**13**	37.0	25.2	4.1	**4.0**	0.7	**1.6**	.450
1979	Denver	3	**40.7**	**28.0**	**7.0**	**4.0**	1.3	0.3	**.551**
1982	Denver	3	22.0	11.7	3.3	2.0	0.3	0.0	.455
1983	Seattle	2	32.5	12.0	0.0	3.5	0.5	0.5	.360
Career		40	37.0	24.1	5.0	3.5	1.0	0.8	.485

== College highlights ==
- The Sporting News national Player of the Year (1975)
- USBWA College Player of the Year (1975)
- Consensus First-Team All-America (1973, 1974, 1975) by Associated Press (AP), United Press International (UPI), Eastman Kodak, The Sporting News
- AP National Player of the Year (1974, 1975)
- UPI Player of the Year (1975)
- Eastman Kodak Award (1975)
- Naismith Award (1975)
- Adolph Rupp Trophy (1975)
- 2× AP Player of the Year (1974, 1975)
- Helms Foundation Player of the Year (1974, 1975)
- National Association of Basketball Coaches Player of the Year (1975)
- United States Basketball Writers Association Player of the Year (1975)
- Sullivan Award finalist (1974, 1975)
- Atlantic Coast Conference (ACC) Player of the Year (1973, 1974, 1975)
- ACC Athlete of the Year (1973, 1975)
- All-ACC First Team (1973, 1974, 1975)
- North Carolina State retired his jersey number 44 (1975)
- Led North Carolina State to the 1974 NCAA championship (30–1 record), 76–64 over Marquette University
- Most Valuable Player (MVP), NCAA Tournament (1974)
- Led Wolfpack to a 79–7 record during his final three seasons (freshmen were ineligible then) including 57–1 during his sophomore and junior seasons (27–0, 30–1), the best in ACC history. His senior year record was 22–6.
- Scored 2,309 points (26.8 ppg) in 86 varsity games; including highs of 57 points as a senior, 41 as a junior and 40 as a sophomore
- Averaged 35.6 ppg, including a 54-point high on the North Carolina State freshman team
- World University Games MVP (1973)
- Enshrined in North Carolina Sports Hall of Fame (1982)
- NCAA All-Decade Team of the 1970s
- Named to the ACC 50th Anniversary men's basketball team as one of the fifty greatest players in ACC history

== ABA/NBA highlights ==
- The Sporting News ABA Rookie of the Year (1976)
- ABA Rookie of the Year (1976)
- All-ABA (1976)
- MVP, 1976 ABA All-Star Game
- All-NBA First Team (1977, 1978)
- Four-time NBA All-Star
- MVP, 1979 NBA All-Star Game
- Only player in history named MVP of both the ABA and NBA All-Star Games
- Scored a career-high 73 points against Detroit (April 9, 1978)
- Scored a then-NBA record 32 points in the second quarter against Detroit Pistons, a record that was broken by George Gervin (33 against New Orleans Jazz on the same day ) when Gervin won the 1978 scoring title with a 63-point output
- The Nuggets retired his jersey number 33 (November 2, 1992)
- Colorado Professional Athlete of the Year (1977)
- Scored 2,158 points (26.0 ppg) in the ABA
- Scored 11,264 points (22.1 ppg) in the NBA

== See also ==
- List of National Basketball Association single-game scoring leaders
