= Ozzie and Daniel Silna =

American businessmen

Ozzie (December 27, 1932 – April 26, 2016) and Daniel (born August 26, 1944) Silna are American businessmen of Latvian descent best known for their success in the textile industry, as well as being co-owners of the American Basketball Association's Spirits of St. Louis and the lucrative deal cut to fold that team during the ABA-NBA merger.

Brothers Ozzie and Daniel Silna made a fortune as pioneers in the manufacture of polyester. In 1974, they wanted to own an NBA team. After an attempt to buy the Detroit Pistons fell short, the Silnas purchased the ABA's Carolina Cougars franchise with the expectation of moving it into the NBA with the impending merger of the two leagues.

On April 26, 2016, Ozzie died of cancer at the age of 83.

== Personal life ==
The Silna brothers are sons of Latvian Jewish immigrants who came to the U.S. via Mandatory Palestine, in the 1930s. The Silnas' father, of Jewish descent, started a textile business in New Jersey. After graduating from Columbia, then Fordham Law School, Dan joined his father's business. In 1969, Dan and Ozzie started their own knitting company, which they sold two years later.

== The Spirits of St. Louis ==
The Silna brothers moved the Cougars to St. Louis, Missouri, because it was then the largest city in the United States without a professional basketball team and they thought this would make their team more likely to join the NBA. In 1974, the Cougars, roster and all, were overhauled and became the ABA's Spirits of St. Louis from 1974 through 1976. The 1974–75 Spirits had upset the reigning ABA champion New York Nets in the 1975 Eastern Division Finals before losing to the eventual champion Kentucky Colonels, but in the 1975–76 season the Spirits' play was uneven and their attendance waned.

The Spirits' 1975–76 season was not a success either on the court or in attendance. In May 1976, due to attendance problems in St. Louis, the Spirits announced that they were going to move to Salt Lake City, Utah, to play as the Utah Rockies when a lease agreement for the Salt Palace was arranged. This followed an attempted merger of the Spirits and the Utah Stars franchise during the 1975–76 season, a merger that, had it occurred, contemplated the team leaving St. Louis for Utah. But the Stars folded before the merger could occur and instead, the Spirits bought the rights to some of the Stars' best players, including future Hall of Famer Moses Malone. In another effort to be included in the ABA–NBA merger, the Silna brothers proposed selling the Spirits to a Utah group, buying the Kentucky Colonels franchise, and moving the Colonels to Buffalo to replace the Buffalo Braves, who were then planning to move to Hollywood, Florida.

The Spirits were not included in the ABA–NBA merger, with the St. Louis and Kentucky players being put into a special dispersal draft. Marvin Barnes went to the Detroit Pistons for $500,000, Moses Malone went to the Portland Trail Blazers for $300,000, Ron Boone went to the Kansas City Kings for $250,000, Randy Denton went to the New York Knicks for $50,000 and Mike Barr also went to the Kansas City Kings, for $15,000. The folding of the Spirits dissolved a very talented basketball team, one that likely would have competed successfully in the NBA. Twelve players from the final two Spirits of St. Louis rosters (1974–76) played in the NBA during the 1976–77 season and beyond: Maurice Lucas, Ron Boone, Marvin Barnes, Caldwell Jones, Lonnie Shelton, Steve Green, Gus Gerard, Moses Malone, Don Adams, Don Chaney, M. L. Carr and Freddie Lewis.

== Deal ==
While the Silna brothers were left out of the NBA, they nonetheless managed to turn it into one of the greatest deals in the history of professional sports. Of the seven teams that finished the final ABA season, the NBA would only accept 4 in the merger. The Virginia Squires folded shortly after the season. The Colonels negotiated a $3.3 million (equivalent to $18.7 million in 2025) buyout from the remaining ABA teams. However, the Spirits held out for more and in June 1976, the owners of the four merging ABA teams, the Denver Nuggets, Indiana Pacers, New York Nets and San Antonio Spurs, agreed to pay the St. Louis owners $2.2 million (equivalent to $12.4 million in 2025) in cash up front and an additional 1/7 share of each of the four remaining teams' television broadcast revenue "for as long as the NBA or its successors continues in its existence" in return for the Spirits folding. This was based on the principle that all seven remaining ABA franchise should get an equal share in the TV revenue of the merged teams. Thus the Silnas would receive checks from the NBA on a yearly basis, representing a 4/7 share of the television money that would normally go to each NBA franchise, or roughly two percent of the entire league's TV money — as compared to the roughly three and a third percent received by each active franchise. Additionally, the Silnas inserted a clause in the contract stipulating that their share could not drop below the amount generated from a 28-team league. With the NBA expanding to 30 teams, each of the former ABA teams was required to pay the Silnas a 1/196 share (1/7 of 1/28) of total league TV revenue, instead of 1/210 (1/7 of 1/30), giving the Silnas a 1/49 share. The contract defined broadcast revenue very broadly, which their attorney during the merger negotiations, Donald Schupak, pointed out "could not be evaded or made obsolete". The Silnas brothers wanted to join the NBA and had originally hoped to parlay the deal into an NBA franchise of their own; instead, the NBA moved forward with paying the brothers (45% each) and their partner/lawyer, Schupak (10%), the annual amounts.

The first year the deal yielded revenue for the Silnas, in 1980–81, of a modest $521,749. However, as the NBA's popularity exploded in 1980s and 1990s, the league's television rights were sold to CBS and then NBC, and additional deals were struck with the TNT and TBS cable networks; league television revenue soared into the hundreds of millions of dollars. Thanks to the deal, the Silnas made millions through the 1980s and at least $4.4 million per year through the 1990s. From 1999 through 2002 the deal netted the Spirits' owners at least $12.53 million per year; from 2003 to 2006 their take was at least $15.6 million per year. By 2010–11 they were receiving $17.45 million annually. In 2014, the deal was costing each former ABA team $5 million a year. The Silna brothers had received roughly $300 million in revenue as of 2014, despite the fact that the Spirits never played an NBA game nor dealt with the costs of fielding a team. They credit their terrific deal to planning they had done ahead of the merger for the Virginia Squires owners; the Silnas had expected the Spirits and Colonels to enter the NBA but for the ailing Squires to be left out, and the Silnas thought up the television revenue deal as a way to treat the Squires' owners fairly if the Squires did not join the NBA with the other ABA teams. However, the deal cut by the Silna brothers and the incredible amount of revenue it has produced over the years has itself become legend.

There have been numerous attempts by the NBA and the former ABA clubs to buy out the deal. It was reported that a $6 million settlement was under consideration in the 1980s. With New Orleans Saints owner Tom Benson purchasing the New Orleans Hornets from the NBA in 2012 and planning to rename the team, there had been talk that the NBA might negotiate a deal to end the TV deals for the Silna brothers in exchange for rights to the Spirits name. This ended up not happening, as the Hornets were renamed the Pelicans.

In January 2014, a conditional settlement agreement between the NBA, the former ABA clubs and the Silnas was announced. As part of the deal, the Silnas were reported to be receiving a $500 million (equivalent to $680 million in 2025) upfront payment from the former ABA teams. In return, the former ABA teams would get majority stake in the Spirits of St. Louis Basketball Club, L.P., which will retain control of a portion of the TV revenue streams of the former ABA teams, with the option to purchase the remaining stake held by the Silnas in the future. Also, the Silnas will drop their litigation against the league seeking a share of additional media revenue streams, with the NBA agreeing to grant some of the disputed funds to the Spirits. The settlement was completed in April 2014.

== Bernie Madoff Ponzi scheme ==
The Silnas lost the money that they had invested with Bernie Madoff, with the trustee for the victims of the scheme alleging that Silna and his associates had received $24 million in unearned income from Madoff.
