= 1973–74 Carolina Cougars season =

ABA basketball team season

- Head coach: Larry Brown
- Arena: Greensboro Coliseum; Charlotte Coliseum; Dorton Arena

Results
- Record: 47–37 (.560)
- Place: Division: 3rd (Eastern)
- Playoff finish: Lost in the Eastern Division Semifinals

The 1973–74 Carolina Cougars season was the fifth and final season of the Cougars in the American Basketball Association and the team's seventh overall season of play when including the two seasons they played as the Houston Mavericks. Billy Cunningham (who had been named the MVP the previous season), Dennis Wuycik, and Mike Lewis were hobbled by injuries through the season, which meant the team struggled to gain much ground in the Division, though they finished consistently enough to qualify for a playoff spot for the second straight season. The Cougars finished 2nd in points scored, with 110.5 per game, but 6th in points allowed with 107.0 per game. The team was 26–16 by the midpoint of the season (with a seven-game winning streak in the middle of it), while going 21–21 for the second half of the season. The biggest losing streak by the Cougars was six games long, which was done near the end of the season, though by that point point in time, they had already clinched the third place spot in the ABA Playoffs, finishing 19 games above the Virginia Squires, who they beat 99–91 in their final regular season game at home. Once again, the Cougars faced the Kentucky Colonels in the playoffs, but once again the Colonels prevailed, this time in a First Round sweep. This turned out to be the final game the Cougars played. Owner Tedd Munchak sold the team after the season ended to a group of New York businessmen, which included Harry Weltman, Donald Schupak, Ozzie Silna and Daniel Silna for $1.5 million. The team subsequently moved to St. Louis to become the Spirits of St. Louis, playing for two seasons.

During the regular season, the Cougars played 21 games in Greensboro, 14 in Charlotte, and 7 in Raleigh; in the playoffs, the team played once in Greensboro, and once in Charlotte. The city of Charlotte in particular would not have another professional basketball team until the Charlotte Hornets first came to the NBA in 1988. That original iteration of the team would stay in the city until 2002 when that franchise first moved to New Orleans (another city that previously held an ABA team in the New Orleans Buccaneers) to become the New Orleans Hornets at the time (though they have since rebranded themselves to the New Orleans Pelicans as of 2013), while Charlotte would have a second NBA team two years later with the Charlotte Bobcats expansion team. Originally, the Hornets and Bobcats held separate histories as franchises properly before 2014 when the Bobcats rebranded themselves as the new iteration of the Charlotte Hornets. Once the new Hornets took place in the NBA, they were granted all of the old Hornets' team history up until their 2002 move to New Orleans alongside the more dubious Bobcats history, while the New Orleans team was allowed to keep the history of the New Orleans Hornets franchise as a part of their own (including the temporary moniker of the New Orleans/Oklahoma City Hornets due to Hurricane Katrina) alongside the newer history of the New Orleans Pelicans.

== ABA Draft ==
Interestingly, this year's ABA draft would involve four different types of drafts throughout the early 1973 year: a "Special Circumstances Draft" on January 15, a "Senior Draft" on April 25, a "Undergraduate Draft" also on April 25, and a "Supplemental Draft" on May 18. As such, the following selections were made in these respective drafts by the Cougars, which could be considered the last official drafts the North Carolina-based franchise would do in the ABA while using the Carolina Cougars name if you don't include them using that team name during the 1974 ABA draft period.

=== ABA Special Circumstances Draft ===
Round	Pick	Player	Position	Nationality	College
2	11	Bobby Jones	PF	United States	North Carolina
2	12	Tommy Burleson	C	United States	North Carolina State

Interestingly, the Cougars were the only team from this specific draft to not have a first round draft picks from the "Special Circumstances Draft" in particular. Despite that notion, however, they would still have two selections in the second round of this specific draft, likely with all of those moves being done with trades involving other ABA teams like the Denver Rockets going down in the process at some point in time. In any case, both of the players the Cougars selected would be players that played college basketball somewhere in the state of North Carolina at the time of the draft, though neither player decided to go play for this franchise specifically either this season or the seasons after that point in time.

=== ABA Senior Draft ===
Round	Pick	Player	Position(s)	Nationality	College
1	10	Mel Davis	PF	United States	St. John's
2	20	Nick Weatherspoon	SF	United States	Illinois
4	40	Krešimir Ćosić	C	(Socialist Federal Republic of Yugoslavia) Yugoslavia; Croatia	Brigham Young University
5	50	Larry Hollyfield	SG/SF	United States	UCLA
6	60	Joe Reaves	SF	United States	Bethel College (Tennessee)
7	70	Ozie Edwards	G	United States	Oklahoma City
8	80	Steve Becker	G	United States	Yankton College
9	90	Abe Steward	F	United States	Jacksonville
10	100	Gerald Smith	C	United States	Detroit

The "Senior Draft" done in April is often considered the official, main draft period of the 1973 ABA draft by basketball historians. Also, the Cougars would select the only player in the entire "Senior Draft" to eventually enter the Naismith Basketball Hall of Fame for their work as a player (as of 2025) in the Yugoslavian-born center Krešimir Ćosić, though Ćosić would get there primarily for his contributions playing professional basketball in his home nation before it got broken up in relation to the Revolutions of 1989 and the Yugoslav Wars of the 1990s, with his home land being modern-day Croatia nowadays.

=== ABA Undergraduate Draft ===
Round	Pick	Player	Position(s)	Nationality	College
11 (1)	110 (10)	Maurice Lucas	PF	United States	Marquette
12 (2)	120 (20)	Kevin Restani	PF/C	United States	San Francisco

The "Undergraduate Draft" is considered a continuation of the "Senior Draft" that was done earlier that same day, hence the numbering of the rounds and draft picks here.

=== ABA Supplemental Draft ===
Round	Pick	Player	Position(s)	Nationality	College
1	8	Cal Tatum	PG	United States	Southern Colorado State
2	16	Steve Smith	F	United States	Loyola University of Los Angeles
3	24	Bill Bailey	F	United States	Catawba College
4	31	Dave Angel	C	United States	Clemson
5	37	Carl Jackson	F	United States	St. Bonaventure
6	44	Lynn Greer	C	United States	Virginia State University
7	50	Dale Adams	F	United States	St. Mary's College of Maryland
8	56	Terrence Murchison	F	United States	Fayetteville State University

In early online ABA Draft media outlets, Cal Tatum was misconstrued as the #1 pick of the "Supplemental Draft" (sometimes even being labelled as someone that was drafted by the wrong team there) due to the lack of proper ordering involved with that particular draft in mind when compared to the other drafts involved before recent discoveries helped provide a proper draft order for the "Supplemental Draft" to go alongside the other drafts done this year by the ABA. (To clarify on that regard, some media outlets chose to order draft picks done by a first name basis over anything else in mind for the "Supplemental Draft", meaning Cal Tatum was sometimes regarded as the #1 pick of that specific draft just because his name was considered the first one up in name ordering for "Supplemental Draft" prospects in the first round. On the contrary, Cal Tatum would be considered the last first round pick in that specific draft so long as the ordering of the "Senior Draft" and "Undergraduate Draft" beforehand remains firm and true here with this draft since it'd be using the same season-ending results on display, minus the fact that both the Indiana Pacers and New York Nets both declined being involved with this specific draft entirely for currently unknown reasons.) Outside of that notion, however, none of the eight players that the Cougars selected would end up playing for them this season or for anyone else either in the ABA or NBA afterward.

== Roster ==
1973–74 Carolina Cougars roster
Players

Pos.	No.	Player	Height	Weight	DOB	From
SF	27	Joe Caldwell	6 ft 5 in (1.96 m)	195 lb (88 kg)	November 1, 1941	Arizona State
PG	20	Mack Calvin	6 ft 0 in (1.83 m)	165 lb (75 kg)	July 27, 1947	USC
C	53	Jim Chones	6 ft 11 in (2.11 m)	220 lb (100 kg)	November 30, 1949	Marquette
SF	32	Billy Cunningham	6 ft 6 in (1.98 m)	210 lb (95 kg)	June 3, 1943	North Carolina
SG	21	Steve Jones	6 ft 5 in (1.96 m)	205 lb (93 kg)	October 17, 1942	Oregon
C	42	Mike Lewis	6 ft 8 in (2.03 m)	225 lb (102 kg)	March 18, 1946	Duke
PG	23	Gene Littles	6 ft 0 in (1.83 m)	160 lb (73 kg)	June 29, 1943	High Point
SF	22	Ed Manning	6 ft 7 in (2.01 m)	210 lb (95 kg)	January 2, 1944	Jackson State
SG	24	Ted McClain	6 ft 1 in (1.85 m)	180 lb (82 kg)	August 30, 1946	Tennessee State
PF	52	Tom Owens	6 ft 10 in (2.08 m)	215 lb (98 kg)	June 28, 1949	South Carolina
PF	31	Marv Roberts	6 ft 8 in (2.03 m)	200 lb (91 kg)	January 29, 1950	Utah State
SG	14	Ollie Taylor	6 ft 2 in (1.88 m)	194 lb (88 kg)	March 7, 1947	Houston
SF	44	Dennis Wuycik	6 ft 6 in (1.98 m)	215 lb (98 kg)	March 29, 1950	North Carolina

Coaches
Head coach
- Larry Brown

Legend
- (DP) Unsigned draft pick
- (FA) Free agent
- (S) Suspended
- Injured

Roster

== Final standings ==
=== Eastern Division ===
Team	W	L	%	GB
New York Nets	55	29	.655	-
Kentucky Colonels	53	31	.631	2
Carolina Cougars	47	37	.560	8
Virginia Squires	28	56	.333	27
Memphis Tams	21	63	.250	34

== ABA Playoffs ==
1974 playoff game log
ABA Eastern Division Semifinals: 0–4 (home: 0–2; road: 0–2)

Game	Date	Team	Score	High points	High rebounds	High assists	Location Attendance	Series
1	April 1	@ Kentucky	L 102–118	Mack Calvin (21)	Jim Chones (7)	Gene Littles (6)	Freedom Hall; 6,749	0–1
2	April 5	Kentucky	L 96–99	Calvin, McClain (20)	Joe Caldwell (13)	Mack Calvin (5)	Greensboro Coliseum; 8,638	0–2
3	April 6	Kentucky	L 110–120	Mack Calvin (25)	Jim Chones (9)	Caldwell, Littles (3)	Charlotte Coliseum; 3,724	0–3
4	April 8	@ Kentucky	L 119–128	Mack Calvin (31)	McClain, Cunningham, Caldwell (7)	Gene Littles (7)	Freedom Hall; 5,243	0–4

1974 schedule

== Awards and honors ==
1974 ABA All-Star Game selections (game played on January 30, 1974)

- Mack Calvin
- Ted McClain
