= 1975–76 Spirits of St. Louis season =

ABA basketball team season

- Head coach: Rod Thorn (20–27); Joe Mullaney (15–22)
- Arena: St. Louis Arena

Results
- Record: 35–49 (.417)
- Place: Division: 3rd Conference: 6th
- Playoff finish: did not qualify

Local media
- Television: KPLR 11
- Radio: WIL

The 1975–76 Spirits of St. Louis season was the second and final season of the Spirits of St. Louis franchise in the American Basketball Association out in St. Louis, Missouri, as well as the ninth and final season of the franchise when including the couple of seasons they played as the Houston Mavericks while in Houston, Texas and the majority of the time they spent as the Carolina Cougars while representing the state of North Carolina as a regional franchise. Early on in the season, the Spirits had discussed the possibility of merging franchises with the Utah Stars, which would have likely saved the Stars franchise at the cost of wiping out the Spirits franchise, but assurances by St. Louis mayor John Poelker that the team would go and finish their season properly ultimately had the Spirits call off the merger plans and subsequently led to the Stars folding as a franchise on December 2, 1975 and have the ABA remove divisions for the rest of the season going forward. Despite the team being led by star players like Marvin Barnes, Moses Malone, Ron Boone and Caldwell Jones, the Spirits would finish their final season of play with a 35–49 record, falling to a sixth place finish (being well ahead of only the Virginia Squires in terms of teams that would actually complete their regular seasons properly (even though the Squires would have a game lost on their schedules during the season)) and being four games behind the Indiana Pacers from taking the final spot available for the truncated 1976 ABA Playoffs. Once the season officially concluded, the team initially planned on moving to Salt Lake City, Utah to become the Utah Rockies for the ABA before the ABA-NBA merger ultimately had them and the Kentucky Colonels be left behind as surviving ABA teams from joining the National Basketball Association (NBA) properly due to their poor attendance as a franchise. Despite the Spirits/Rockies folding operations after many of their best attempts to join the NBA came and went, the Silna brothers would end up receiving a deal that came through the merger that would be perceived as one of the best deals ever made in the process.

== Offseason ==
=== ABA Draft ===
Round	Pick	Player	Position(s)	Nationality	College
1	5	Gus Williams	PG	United States	USC
2	15	Rudy White	SG	United States	Arizona State
3	25	Rudy Hackett	PF	United States	Syracuse
4	35	Tom Roy	C	United States	Maryland
5	45	Larry Fogle	G	United States	Canisius College
5	46	C. J. Kupec	PF/C	United States	Michigan
6	55	Allen Jones	SF	United States	San Diego
7	65	Allen Spruill	SG	United States	North Carolina A&T State
8	75	Ted Hathaway	G	United States	Cleveland State

The Spirits of St. Louis also had the opportunity to use a bonus draft pick that they had acquired back when they first lost Billy Cunningham to the Philadelphia 76ers of the NBA back when the Spirits were originally the Carolina Cougars, but they ultimately declined using their bonus pick entirely (likely for monetary purposes).

=== Preseason transactions ===
- Don Chaney of the Boston Celtics, signed in September 1974 to a three-year contract starting with the 1975–76 season, joined the Spirits
- Rod Thorn hired as head coach
- M.L. Carr signed as a free agent, July 31, 1975

=== Preseason exhibition games ===
Like most ABA teams, the Spirits of St. Louis played preseason exhibition games against NBA squads.

On October 8, 1975, the Spirits for the first time faced their in-state rivals, the Kansas City Kings, in Columbia, Missouri. Marvin Barnes had 24 points and 14 rebounds for the Spirits; Nate Archibald had 24 points for the Kings. The Spirits won, 95–90.

On October 17, 1975, the Spirits and Kings met again, this time in Kiel Auditorium in St. Louis. The Kings won the rematch, 114–108.

On October 18, 1975, in Carbondale, Illinois, the Spirits played the Philadelphia 76ers. St. Louis' Maurice Lucas had 21 points and 15 rebounds; Philadelphia's Billy Cunningham - who had played in the ABA for the team the Spirits displaced, the Carolina Cougars - led the 76ers with 15 points. The Spirits won, 107–91, in what would be their final game against an NBA team.

== Roster ==
1975–76 Spirits of St. Louis roster
Players

Pos.	No.	Player	Height	Weight	DOB	From
SF	10	Don Adams	6 ft 6 in (1.98 m)	210 lb (95 kg)	November 27, 1947	Northwestern
PF	24	Marvin Barnes	6 ft 8 in (2.03 m)	210 lb (95 kg)	July 27, 1952	Providence
SG	34	Mike Barr	6 ft 3 in (1.91 m)	180 lb (82 kg)	October 19, 1950	Duquesne
SG	1	Ron Boone	6 ft 2 in (1.88 m)	200 lb (91 kg)	September 6, 1946	Idaho State
SF	30	M.L. Carr	6 ft 6 in (1.98 m)	205 lb (93 kg)	January 9, 1951	Guilford
SG	12	Don Chaney	6 ft 5 in (1.96 m)	210 lb (95 kg)	March 22, 1946	Houston
SG	10	Mike D'Antoni	6 ft 3 in (1.91 m)	185 lb (84 kg)	May 8, 1951	Marshall
C	45	Randy Denton	6 ft 10 in (2.08 m)	240 lb (109 kg)	February 18, 1949	Duke
SF	11	Gus Gerard	6 ft 8 in (2.03 m)	200 lb (91 kg)	July 27, 1953	Virginia
SF	42	Steve Green	6 ft 7 in (2.01 m)	220 lb (100 kg)	October 4, 1953	Indiana
PF	13	Rudy Hackett	6 ft 9 in (2.06 m)	210 lb (95 kg)	May 10, 1953	Syracuse
C	3	Caldwell Jones	6 ft 11 in (2.11 m)	217 lb (98 kg)	August 4, 1950	Albany State
PG	1	Freddie Lewis	6 ft 0 in (1.83 m)	175 lb (79 kg)	July 1, 1943	Arizona State
C	20	Maurice Lucas	6 ft 9 in (2.06 m)	215 lb (98 kg)	February 18, 1952	Marquette
PF	13	Moses Malone	6 ft 10 in (2.08 m)	215 lb (98 kg)	March 23, 1955	Petersburg High School
SG	40	Barry Parkhill	6 ft 4 in (1.93 m)	185 lb (84 kg)	May 10, 1951	Virginia
PF	42	Harry Rogers	6 ft 7 in (2.01 m)	195 lb (88 kg)	December 31, 1950	Saint Louis
C	45	Paul Ruffner	6 ft 10 in (2.08 m)	225 lb (102 kg)	October 15, 1948	BYU

Coaches
Head coach
- Rod Thorn (20-27) / Joe Mullaney (15-22)

Legend
- (DP) Unsigned draft pick
- (FA) Free agent
- (S) Suspended
- Injured

Roster

== Regular season ==
=== Season standings ===
Team	W	L	PCT.	GB
Denver Nuggets *	60	24	.714	—
**New York Nets** *	55	29	.655	5
San Antonio Spurs *	50	34	.595	10
Kentucky Colonels *	46	38	.548	14
Indiana Pacers *	39	45	.464	21
Spirits of St. Louis	35	49	.417	25
Virginia Squires †	15	68	.181	44
San Diego Sails †	3	8	.273	—
Utah Stars †	4	12	.250	—
Baltimore Claws †	0	0	.000	—

Asterisk (*) denotes playoff team
† did not survive the end of the season.
Bold – ABA champions

=== Month by Month ===
==== October 1975 ====
On October 24, 1975, the Spirits opened their season before 5,003 fans at home against the New York Nets. New York's Julius Erving led all scorers with 27 points and the Nets won 109–94. The next night in Denver the Spirits lost to the Denver Nuggets 108–101; 12,202 saw David Thompson put in a game-high 33. The following night, October 26, 1975, the Spirits gained their first victory of the season, before only 1,144 fans in St. Louis. Maurice Lucas' game-high 25 points led the Spirits past the San Diego Sails 101–85.

On October 29, 1975, the visiting Spirits won at Hampton Roads, Virginia, against the Virginia Squires, 104–100 in overtime. Willie Wise led all scorers with 38. The Spirits closed out the month on October 31 with a road game against the New York Nets which the Spirits won 120–116 in their second overtime game in a row, in spite of Julius Erving's game-best 42 point performance. The Spirits entered the second month of the season with a 3–2 record.

==== April 1976 ====
On April 2, 1976, though no one knew it at the time, the Spirits notched the final victory in franchise history with a 110–109 victory over the Virginia Squires. St. Louis' home crowd was only 1,388; Ticky Burden led all scorers with 28. The next night in Louisville the Spirits lost 106–102 to the Kentucky Colonels. 5,190 fans saw Artis Gilmore lead all scorers with 28 points. The next night, April 4, 1976, though unbeknownst to anyone at the time, the Spirits played their final home game, drawing 2,010 fans for a close overtime loss to the Kentucky Colonels, 106–105. Moses Malone led all scorers with 32 points.

On April 6, 1976, the Spirits played the final game in the team's history, losing in the Hampton Roads to the Virginia Squires, 120–116, before 2,448 fans. Mike Green was the game's leading scorer with 25.

== Player statistics ==
=== Legend ===
- GP: Games played
- GS: Games started
- MPG: Minutes per game
- FG%: Field goal percentage
- 3FG%: 3-point field goal percentage
- FT%: Free throw percentage
- RPG: Rebounds per game
- APG: Assists per game
- SPG: Steals per game
- BPG: Blocks per game
- PPG: Points per game

=== Season ===
Player	GP	GS	MPG	FG%	3FG%	FT%	RPG	APG	SPG	BPG	PPG

=== ABA Playoffs ===
The Spirits of St. Louis would be one of only two ABA teams to complete their regular season to miss the 1976 ABA Playoffs, as well as became the only ABA team that missed the ABA Playoffs that year to survive their entire season and later officially missed out on joining the NBA entirely after missing the 1976 ABA Playoffs in the first place, surviving up to and including the league's playoff period unlike the Virginia Squires.

== Awards and records ==
=== Awards ===
- Marvin Barnes, 1976 ABA All-Star Game
- Ron Boone, 1976 ABA All-Star Game
- Maurice Lucas, 1976 ABA All-Star Game
- M. L. Carr, 1976 ABA All-Rookie Team

=== Records ===
- On November 9, 1975, the homestanding Spirits faced the San Diego Sails in what turned out to be the final game in Sails franchise history. St. Louis won, 95–92, before only 1,194 fans.
- On November 29, 1975, the visiting Spirits faced the Utah Stars in what turned out to be the final game in Stars history. Utah won, 136–100, before 4,683 fans.
- On March 5, 1976, David Thompson of the Denver Nuggets, against the Spirits, set an ABA record with 21 points in the first quarter. Denver won at home 137–125; attendance was 13,522.
- On March 10, 1976, against the Spirits, the New York Nets' Jim Eakins had his consecutive game streak ended at 490. St. Louis won at home, 99–95, before 7,702 fans.

== Transactions ==
=== Trades ===
- Moses Malone, Ron Boone, Randy Denton and Steve Green purchased from the Utah Stars, December 2, 1975
- Gus Gerard sold to the Denver Nuggets, December 18, 1975
- Rod Thorn, with a 20–27 record, replaced as head coach by Joe Mullaney
- Maurice Lucas traded to the Kentucky Colonels for Caldwell Jones, December 17, 1975

== Legacy and Aftermath ==
In May 1976, due to attendance problems in St. Louis and with the ABA-NBA merger pending, the Spirits announced that they were going to move to Salt Lake City, Utah, to play as the Utah Rockies when a lease agreement for the Salt Palace was first arranged for them. This followed an attempted merger of the Spirits and the Utah Stars franchise during the 1975–76 season, a merger that, had it occurred, contemplated the team leaving St. Louis for Utah to likely be a part of the longer-lasting and more successful Stars franchise. In another effort to be included in the ABA-NBA merger, the Silna brothers proposed selling the Spirits to a Utah group, buying the Kentucky Colonels franchise from John Y. Brown, Jr. (who had met his wits ends with the Colonels and their hopes on them joining the NBA by that point in time), and moving the Colonels to Buffalo to replace the Buffalo Braves, who were then planning to move to Hollywood, Florida. A third effort on the Silna brothers' end to have them join the NBA had them propose that they move the Spirits to Hartford, Connecticut (who were home to the New England Whalers WHA franchise at the time) instead, but that was also rejected due to the Boston Celtics being adamant on another franchise encroaching upon nearby territory of theirs that they promote their games under.

The Spirits were not included in the ABA-NBA merger, but the Silna brothers nonetheless managed to turn it into one of the greatest deals in the history of professional sports. In June 1976 the ABA owners agreed, in return for the Spirits of St. Louis ceasing operations, to pay the St. Louis owners $2.2 million in cash up front in addition to a 1/7 share of the four remaining teams' television revenues in perpetuity. As the NBA's popularity exploded in 1980s and 1990s, the league's television rights were sold to CBS and then NBC, and additional deals were struck with the TNT and TBS cable networks; league television revenue soared into the hundreds of millions of dollars. Over the past 25 years, the Silnas have collected approximately $100 million from the NBA, despite the fact that the Spirits never played an NBA game. The Silnas continue to receive checks from the NBA on a yearly basis, representing a 4/7 share of the television money that would normally go to any NBA franchise, or roughly two percent of the entire league's TV money. Thanks to their deal during the ABA-NBA merger the Silnas made millions through 1980s and at least $4.4 million per year through 1990s. From 1999 through 2002 the deal netted the Spirits' owners at least $12.53 million per year; from 2003 to 2006 their take was at least $15.6 million per year. The two Silna brothers each get 45% of that television revenue per year and their attorney during the merger negotiations, Donald Schupak, receives 10%. They credit their terrific deal to planning they had done ahead of the merger for the recently defunct Virginia Squires franchise's owners; the Silnas had expected the Spirits and Colonels to enter the NBA while the ailing Squires to be left out entirely before the Squires folded operations a month before the actual merger talks began, and the Silnas thought up the television revenue deal as a way to treat the Squires' owners fairly if the Squires did not join the NBA with the other ABA teams at the time.

=== ABA Dispersal Draft ===
The ABA–NBA merger terms included the St. Louis (and Kentucky) players being put into a special dispersal draft. Marvin Barnes went to the Detroit Pistons for $500,000, Moses Malone went to the Portland Trail Blazers for $300,000, Ron Boone went to the Kansas City Kings for $250,000, Randy Denton went to the New York Knicks for $50,000 and Mike Barr also went to the Kansas City, for $15,000.

The folding of the Spirits franchise dissolved a basketball team, whose former players had notable NBA careers. Twelve players from the final two Spirits of St. Louis rosters (1974–76) played in the NBA during the 1976–77 season or later, with nine of them becoming starters on NBA teams that season. The deal secured by the Silna brothers later became notable for its financial impact.
