= Utah Rockies =

Proposed professional basketball team

Utah Rockies was the name under which the Spirits of St. Louis were to play during the ultimately aborted 1976–77 American Basketball Association (ABA) season.

The Spirits of St. Louis had some earlier connections to Utah. On November 29, 1975, the Spirits of St. Louis and the Utah Stars discussed a merger of the two franchises. On December 1, 1975, the Spirits announced that they would remain in St. Louis after word leaked out that they were contemplating a merger with the Stars, with the resulting team playing in Utah. The Stars folded and on December 2, 1975, the Spirits of St. Louis obtained some of Utah's best players: Moses Malone, Ron Boone, Randy Denton and Steve Green. Not only that, but near the end of the final ABA season of play, people within the organization's offices preemptively referred to the team as the "Spirits of Utah" during phone calls instead of the regular Spirits of St. Louis that they had been known for since it seemed that people within the organization knew that the team would move to the state of Utah by the end of the ABA's final season to play their upcoming season in the state of Utah instead, assuming they would even play games at all by then.

At the end of the 1975–76 ABA season, the Virginia Squires folded after being unable to make a league-mandated financial payment. Because the Baltimore Claws had folded in the preseason and the San Diego Sails and Utah Stars folded during the regular season, the ABA went from ten teams in the preseason to only six at the end of the season. The six remaining teams were the Indiana Pacers, San Antonio Spurs, Denver Nuggets, New York Nets, Kentucky Colonels and the Spirits of St. Louis.

On May 19, 1976, the Spirits of St. Louis announced that they planned to relocate to Salt Lake City, Utah, as the Utah Rockies for the 1976–77 season, and that negotiations were underway for the team to play at the Salt Palace. Meanwhile, discussions that eventually resulted in the ABA-NBA merger were nearing completion.

As part of the franchise shift, Spirits owners Daniel and Ozzie Silna proposed that they would sell the team to a group in Utah, and then purchase the Kentucky Colonels with the intention of moving the franchise to Buffalo, New York, home of the Buffalo Braves, an NBA team that was contemplating moving to Florida. Colonels owner John Y. Brown, Jr., ultimately took a cash payout when the ABA-NBA merger occurred, and used the money to purchase a 50% interest in the Braves himself. After a complex transaction which led to Brown becoming owner of the Boston Celtics, the Braves moved to San Diego in 1978 as the San Diego Clippers, who in turn became the Los Angeles Clippers in 1984.

On June 17, 1976, the ABA and NBA announced the ABA-NBA merger that brought the Spurs, Pacers, Nets and Nuggets into the NBA but left out the Colonels and the Spirits/Rockies clubs. Brown received a flat $3 million in cash for the Colonels. The owners of the Spirits/Rockies received $2.2 million in cash and a one-seventh share of the four remaining ABA teams' television revenues in perpetuity. That deal has been reported as worth approximately $800+ million in the years since; the Utah Rockies' owners were made multimillionaires through NBA television revenue even though the team never played a single NBA game.

The Spirits/Rockies players were released to a dispersal draft, as were the Colonels' players. Marvin Barnes went to the Detroit Pistons. Moses Malone went to the Portland Trail Blazers. Randy Denton went to the New York Knicks. Ron Boone and Mike Barr went to the Kansas City Kings. However, Spirits general manager and co-owner Harry Weltman also figured that, had the franchise been able to make it as a surviving franchise within the June 1976 NBA-ABA merger alongside the other four surviving ABA teams (ideally with the ABA's planned survival of every remaining ABA team that was left at the time outside of the Virginia Squires, who were already forcefully folded operations a month prior to merger negotiations beginning, coming to fruition), the Rockies (as they were planned to have been at the time) would have been a great team in the NBA since, even though they had only eleven of their players actually playing in the NBA by that point in time, nine of their own players were actually starting for various NBA teams for the 1976-77 NBA season when including Lonnie Shelton, who claimed his ABA draft rights from the Baltimore Claws following their closure days before the start of the 1975-76 ABA season, and especially noting praise for the team's frontcourt before it was broken up in the 1976 ABA dispersal draft.

Professional basketball returned to Salt Lake City when the New Orleans Jazz relocated in 1979 to become the Utah Jazz.
