= Ed Manning =

American basketball player and coach (1944–2011)

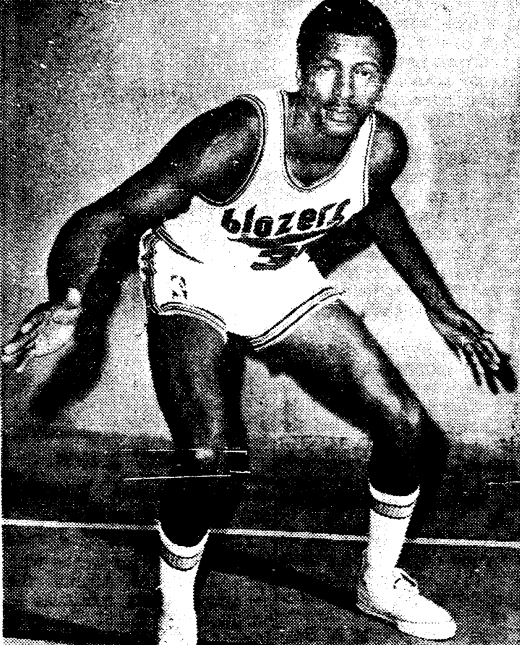

Personal information
- Born: January 2, 1943 Summit, Mississippi, U.S.
- Died: March 4, 2011 (aged 67) Fort Worth, Texas, U.S.
- Listed height: 6 ft 7 in (2.01 m)
- Listed weight: 210 lb (95 kg)

Career information
- College: Jackson State (1963–1967)
- NBA draft: 1967: 8th round, 80th overall pick
- Drafted by: Baltimore Bullets
- Playing career: 1967–1978
- Position: Power forward
- Number: 35, 16, 22, 42

Career history
- 1967–1970: Baltimore Bullets
- 1970: Chicago Bulls
- 1970–1971: Portland Trail Blazers
- 1971–1974: Carolina Cougars
- 1974–1975: New York Nets
- 1975: Indiana Pacers
- 1978: Carolina Lightning

Career NBA and ABA statistics
- Points: 3,541 (5.9 ppg)
- Rebounds: 2,717 (4.5 rpg)
- Assists: 494 (0.8 apg)
- Stats at NBA.com
- Stats at Basketball Reference

Edward R. Manning (January 2, 1944 – March 4, 2011) was an American professional basketball player and college and National Basketball Association (NBA) assistant coach. He was the father of former NBA player and college coach Danny Manning.

He played college basketball for the Jackson State University Tigers from 1963 to 1967 and scored 1,610 career points. He was a member of the Kappa Alpha Psi fraternity. Manning was inducted into the Jackson State University Sports Hall of Fame in 2003.

He was drafted in the eighth round (80th overall) of the 1967 NBA draft by the Baltimore Bullets. In four NBA seasons with the Bullets, Chicago Bulls and Portland Trail Blazers, Manning averaged 5.1 points and 4.5 rebounds per game. He then played five seasons in the ABA—three with the Carolina Cougars and one each with the New York Nets and Indiana Pacers—averaging 6.6 points and 4.5 rebounds per game. He later played for several professional European teams.

In 1983, he was hired as an assistant basketball coach at the University of Kansas under Larry Brown and was on the staff of the team that won the 1988 national championship. Manning followed Brown to San Antonio in 1988 to serve as an assistant coach for the Spurs, where Brown had been hired as the team's head coach.

Manning later served as a scout for the Spurs. He died from a heart condition at age 67 in Fort Worth, Texas.

== Career statistics ==
Legend
GP	Games played	GS	Games started	MPG	Minutes per game
FG%	Field goal percentage	3P%	3-point field goal percentage	FT%	Free throw percentage
RPG	Rebounds per game	APG	Assists per game	SPG	Steals per game
BPG	Blocks per game	PPG	Points per game	**Bold**	Career high

=== NBA/ABA ===
==== Regular season ====
Year	Team	GP	MPG	FG%	3P%	FT%	RPG	APG	SPG	BPG	PPG
1967–68	Baltimore	71	13.4	.432		.606	5.3	.5			4.0
1968–69	Baltimore	63	11.5	.448		.648	3.9	.3			4.7
1969–70	Baltimore	29	5.6	.485		.625	1.2	.1			2.4
1969–70	Chicago	38	16.2	.341		.771	5.2	.9			5.6
1970–71	Portland	79	19.7	.435		.806	5.2	**1.4**			7.1
1971–72	Carolina (ABA)	77	21.4	.457	.000	.833	**5.7**	.8			7.2
1972–73	Carolina (ABA)	**83**	19.7	.475	.000	.762	4.7	.8			7.1
1973–74	Carolina (ABA)	82	**22.1**	**.488**	**.500**	**.851**	4.5	1.2	**1.1**	**.2**	**8.3**
1974–75	N.Y. Nets (ABA)	70	14.2	.424	.000	.833	3.0	.8	.6	.1	3.4
1975–76	Indiana (ABA)	12	11.2	.400	–	.706	3.1	1.2	.3	**.2**	5.0
Career (NBA)		280	14.3	.423		.702	4.5	.7			5.1
Career (ABA)		324	19.2	.466	.125	.816	4.5	.9	.8	.2	6.6
Career (overall)		604	16.9	.448	.125	.764	4.5	.8	.8	.2	5.9

==== Playoffs ====
Year	Team	GP	MPG	FG%	3P%	FT%	RPG	APG	SPG	BPG	PPG
1969	Baltimore	4	15.8	.389		–	**5.8**	.3			3.5
1970	Chicago	2	14.5	.500		.500	4.5	**1.5**			5.5
1973	Carolina (ABA)	**12**	**21.8**	**.537**	–	.783	4.8	.7			8.3
1974	Carolina (ABA)	4	20.3	.486	**1.000**	**1.000**	3.3	.0	.0	**.3**	**10.5**
1975	N.Y. Nets (ABA)	3	6.0	.286	.000	**1.000**	.3	.0	.0	.0	1.7
Career (NBA)		6	15.3	.429		.500	5.3	.7			4.2
Career (ABA)		19	19.0	.508	.500	.828	3.7	.4	.0	.1	8.1
Career (overall)		25	18.1	.494	.500	.806	4.1	.5	.0	.1	7.1
