= Ron Boone =

American basketball player (born 1946)

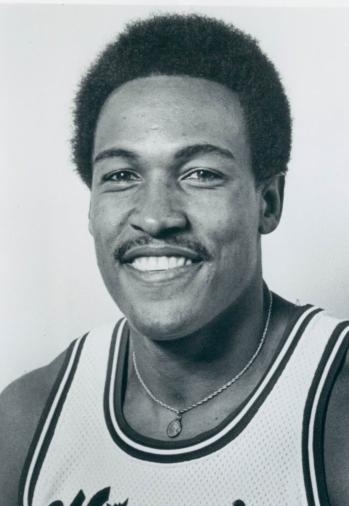

Personal information
- Born: September 6, 1946 (age 80) Oklahoma City, Oklahoma, U.S.
- Listed height: 6 ft 2 in (1.88 m)
- Listed weight: 200 lb (91 kg)

Career information
- High school: Omaha Technical (Omaha, Nebraska)
- College: Clarinda CC (1964–1965); Idaho State (1965–1968)
- NBA draft: 1968: 11th round, 147th overall pick
- Drafted by: Phoenix Suns
- Playing career: 1968–1981
- Position: Shooting guard
- Number: 12, 24, 1

Career history
- 1968–1971: Dallas / Texas Chaparrals
- 1971–1975: Utah Stars
- 1975–1976: Spirits of St. Louis
- 1976–1978: Kansas City Kings
- 1978–1979: Los Angeles Lakers
- 1979–1981: Utah Jazz

Career highlights
- ABA champion (1971); 4× ABA All-Star (1971, 1974–1976); ABA All-Rookie First Team (1969); All-ABA First Team (1974); All-ABA Second Team (1975); ABA All-Time Team; 2× First-team All-Big Sky (1967, 1968)

Career ABA and NBA statistics
- Points: 17,437 (16.8 ppg)
- Rebounds: 4,348 (4.2 rpg)
- Steals: 823 (1.3 spg)
- Stats at NBA.com
- Stats at Basketball Reference

Ronald Bruce Boone (born September 6, 1946) is an American former professional basketball player. He had a 13-year career in the American Basketball Association (ABA) and National Basketball Association (NBA). Boone set a record for most consecutive games played in professional basketball history with 1,041 (Note: This record was later surpassed and is still held by A.C. Green with 1,192 consecutive games.) and claims to have never missed a game from when he started playing basketball in the fourth grade until his retirement. Boone is the current color commentator on Utah Jazz broadcasts.

== High school career ==
Boone grew up in the Logan Fontenelle housing project and attended Technical High School in North Omaha, Nebraska. In high school, Boone played basketball for Coach Neal Mosser, who had led Tech to the 1963 State title and had coached Basketball Hall of Famer Bob Boozer and Baseball Hall of Famer Bob Gibson before Boone. Boone stood only 5'7" when he graduated from high school and didn't become a starter in basketball until his senior season. Boone played baseball under Coach Josh Gibson, older brother of Baseball Hall of Fame pitcher Bob Gibson, who also was an Omaha native and Technical High School alumnus.

Small in stature at the time, Boone reflected on his basketball aspirations after high school. “I remember playing in a league down at the local YMCA and just having a good time — scoring points — and this friend of mine asked one of the officials if he thought I could play major college basketball and the guy said, ‘No way,’ Boone recalled. “That was always in the back of my mind because I thought I could. If there was anything in my life that I can say inspired me, it was those comments.”

== College career ==
=== Clarinda Community College 1964–1965 ===
After high school, Boone and a teammate accepted offers to play junior college basketball. Boone played one season at Clarinda Community College in Clarinda, Iowa, where he suddenly grew to 6'2" and averaged 26 points per game.

=== Idaho State University 1965–1968 ===
Following his tenure at Clarinda Community College, Boone enrolled at Idaho State University (ISU) in Pocatello, Idaho, where he received a scholarship and played for the Bengals, of the Big Sky Conference from 1965 to 1968.

As a sophomore, Boone averaged 10.9 points and 9.4 rebounds in 1965–1966. Boone played under Idaho State Coach Claude Retherford, as the Bengals finished the season with a 7–19 overall. Retherford was a former college teammate of Boone's high school coach Neil Mosser.

"It was Coach Mosser who helped me get a basketball scholarship to Idaho State." Boone reflected later, "I was accepted sight unseen and now, 30 years later, Claude Retherford is still one of my best friends. He visits me in Salt Lake City every spring and I teach his basketball camp every summer."

In 1966–1967, Idaho State finished the season with a record of 10–15, with Boone averaging 22.3 points and 5.1 rebounds.

As a senior in 1967–1968, Boone averaged 21.3 points, 4.2 rebounds and 3.8 assists as Idaho State finished the season with a record of 10–12, playing under new Coach Danny Miller.

In his three seasons with Idaho State University, Boone averaged 20.0 points and 5.4 rebounds in 61 games, never missing a game. Boone was named to the First–team All-Big Sky teams in both 1967 and 1968.

== ABA/NBA career ==
After graduating from Idaho State University, Boone was selected by both the American Basketball Association's Dallas Chaparrals in the 1968 ABA draft and by the Phoenix Suns in the 1968 NBA draft. Boone opted to play for Dallas in the ABA.

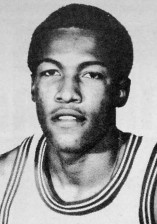
Boone, circa 1971

Of his choice to play in the ABA, Boone said: "I chose the ABA because my college coach said it was a young league and I’d probably have a better chance of making professional basketball there. I felt that by going to the ABA I probably had a shot. I still had to prove myself. At the time Cliff Hagan, who is a legend, was the coach for the Chaparrals. We had to play two-on-two and he would always play. I remember hearing about this hook shot that he had that was awesome, left and right, and during that time I blocked his hook shot a couple of times. I really think, even today, that’s the reason I ended up making the team."

=== Dallas Chaparrals 1968–1971 ===
Boone played two seasons with the Dallas Chaparrals (today's San Antonio Spurs) from 1968 to 1971. As a rookie in 1968–1969, Boone averaged 18.9 points, 5.1 rebounds and 3.6 assists under Coach Cliff Hagan. Dallas finished 41–37, losing to the New Orleans Buccaneers 4 games to 3 in the ABA Playoffs. Boone made the ABA All-Rookie First Team.

Boone averaged 17.1 points, 5.3 rebounds and 4.3 assists in 201 games with the Dallas Chaparrals.

=== Utah Stars 1971–1975 ===
Boone was traded to the Utah Stars from Dallas in mid-season of the 1970–71 ABA season, while averaging 20.0 points in 42 games with Dallas. In January 1971, the Stars traded Donnie Freeman and Wayne Hightower to the Chaparrals for Boone and Glen Combs.

Boone, alongside Zelmo Beaty, Willie Wise and Glen Combs, helped lead the Utah Stars to the 1971 ABA championship under Coach Bill Sharman. Utah finished the 1970–1971 regular season 57–27, with Boone averaging 18.8 points, 5.8 rebounds and 2.6 assists after coming over in the trade from Dallas. Boone averaged 17.6 points in the ABA Finals 4 games to 3 victory over the Kentucky Colonels, with Dan Issel and Louis Dampier. The Stars had defeated the Indiana Pacers 4 games to 3 and his former team, the Dallas Chaparrals 4 games to 0 to reach the ABA Finals. Boone averaged 21.0 points in the Dallas series and 14.9 in the Indiana series.

Over the course of six seasons with the Utah Stars, Boone averaged 18.6 points, 5.0 rebounds, 3.9 assists and 1.5 steals in 396 games.

=== St. Louis Spirits 1975–1976 ===
The Utah Stars franchise folded after 16 games in 1975–1976, with the NBA and ABA merger imminent. Boone played for the Spirits of St. Louis for the remainder of the 1975–76 season. Overall, Boone averaged 26.2 points for Utah and 21.0 in 62 games for St. Louis, playing alongside Hall of Famer Moses Malone as well as Marvin Barnes, Maurice Lucas, M.L. Carr, Caldwell Jones, Gus Gerard and Mike D'Antoni. St. Louis then disbanded after the demise of the ABA.

Boone was a four-time ABA All-Star (1971, 1974–1976).

=== Kansas City Kings 1977–1978 ===
After the ABA–NBA merger in June 1976 Boone played in the NBA for the Kansas City Kings. On August 5, 1976, he was drafted by the Kings from the Spirits of St. Louis in the dispersal draft.

Playing for Coach Phil Johnson in 1976–1977, Boone led the Kings in scoring, averaging 22.2 points, along with 3.9 rebounds, 4.1 assists and 1.5 steals, as the Kansas City finished 40–42.

Boone averaged 17.7 points for the Kings in 1977–1978, along with 3.3 rebounds 3.8 assists and 1.3 steals.

=== Los Angeles Lakers 1978–1979 ===
On June 26, 1978, Boone was traded twice. First, he was traded by the Kansas City Kings with a 1979 2nd round draft pick (Mark Young was later selected) to the Denver Nuggets for Mike Evans and Darnell Hillman. Then, on the same day, June 26, 1978, he was traded by the Denver Nuggets with a 1979 2nd round draft pick (Ollie Mack was later selected) and a 1979 2nd round draft pick (Mark Young was later selected) to the Los Angeles Lakers for Charlie Scott.

Boone played for the Los Angeles Lakers as a reserve for Coach Jerry West in 1978–1979, averaging 7.4 points in 82 games, playing only 19 minutes per game.

=== Utah Jazz 1979–1981 ===
On October 25, 1979, Boone was traded by the Lakers to the Utah Jazz for a 1981 3rd round draft pick (Zam Fredrick was later selected), returning to Utah and finishing his professional career with two seasons playing for the Utah Jazz.

In 1979–1980, Boone averaged 12.9 points under Coach Jazz Tom Nissalke, playing alongside Hall of Famers Adrian Dantley and Pete Maravich.

In his final season, in a reserve role, Boone averaged 7.8 points in 52 games. On January 26, 1981, Boone was waived by the Utah Jazz. Boone immediately had offers to play for other teams, but chose to retire following his release, saying "it was the right time to retire."

In his career, Boone played in 1041 total games, without ever missing a game. He averaged 16.8 points, 4.2 rebounds, 3.7 assists and 1.3 steals, with 17,437 total career points. In 84 career playoff games, Boone averaged 16.1 points, 4.4 rebounds, 4.6 assists and 1.7 steals.

In the ABA, Boone averaged 18.4 points, 5.0 rebounds, 3.9 assists and 1.6 steals in 662 career ABA games. Boone averaged 13.9 points, 2.8 rebounds, 3.4 assists and 1.1 steals in 379 career NBA games.

== 1,041 consecutive games streak ==
Boone's streak of 1,041 consecutive games played has only been surpassed by A. C. Green, who appeared in 1,192 straight games. Johnny "Red" Kerr held the previous record of 844. Boone is likely the only player in major professional sports history to have never missed a single game played in his career. In 13 total seasons, Boone played in 1,041 out of 1,041 possible games throughout both the ABA & NBA. Prior to that, Boone did not miss a game in college and claimed to have not missed a game in his pre–high school and high school career. Boone has never missed a game as a broadcaster as well.

Of the consecutive games streak, Boone said, "It wasn’t important at all. You want to play, you want to play every game and you don’t even think about it. Later on in my career I thought “boy, this is something special.” And then you start taking pride in it, the fact that I’ve never pulled a hamstring or a muscle or a groin. You start thinking, 'Why? Why hasn't something like that happened to me?' I realized it went all the way back to my high school days. My high school coach talked about stretching, warming up and getting ready to play. From when I started playing in fourth grade. What a great story that is. That a guy can go his whole career without missing a game."

== Career notes ==
Boone finished 3rd all-time in American Basketball Association scoring with 12,153 points, behind Dan Issel (12,823) and Louie Dampier (13,726). He also finished 6th all-time in ABA assists (2,569), 5th in games played (662), 5th in minutes played (21,586), 2nd in personal fouls (2,245), and 1st in turnovers (2,327). Of the top five leading scorers in ABA history: Dampier, Issel, Boone, Mel Daniels and Julius Erving, Boone is the only one of the five not in the Naismith Memorial Basketball Hall of Fame.

In Terry Pluto's book on the history of the ABA, Loose Balls, interviewees noted that Boone's nickname was "The Legend", because he always showed up each season in shape and always was remarkably consistent. At the time of his retirement, Boone had the distinction of having played the most consecutive games of any player in the history of professional basketball – 1,041 in a row between the ABA and NBA. This record has since been broken by A.C. Green. However, Boone played at least 20 minutes in each game.

== Basketball announcing career 1988–present ==
For the past 34 years, Boone has been a broadcaster for the Utah Jazz contests. Boone starting calling games for the Jazz in September, 1988. The Utah Jazz' partnered "Hot Rod" Hundley and Boone as announcers for many years. To many Jazz fans the duo was synonymous with Jazz basketball.

== Personal ==
Boone has a son, JaRon; a daughter, Jozette; and three grandchildren. His wife Jackie died of cancer, at age 62, in 2008.

JaRon Boone played college basketball at the University of Nebraska from 1992 to 1996, averaging 12.2 points, 2.7 rebounds and 3.5 assists in 127 career games.

Boone is an avid golfer saying, "The game of golf is an individual sport that just drives you to try to beat it. You’re constantly trying to beat this golf course, knowing damn well how tough it is. Then the margin of error in the game itself is so small, it just makes it so competitive and so hard to beat it. It’s an addiction. So many friends of mine take up this game and they can’t believe what it does. What you become after taking it up."

Boone hosts the annual "Ron Boone Golf Classic" which benefits the Huntsman Cancer Institute.

== Career statistics ==
Legend
GP	Games played	GS	Games started	MPG	Minutes per game
FG%	Field goal percentage	3P%	3-point field goal percentage	FT%	Free throw percentage
RPG	Rebounds per game	APG	Assists per game	SPG	Steals per game
BPG	Blocks per game	PPG	Points per game	**Bold**	Career high
*	Led the league

†	Denotes seasons in which Boone's team won an ABA championship
‡	ABA record

=== ABA/NBA ===
==== Regular season ====
Year	Team	GP	GS	MPG	FG%	3P%	FT%	RPG	APG	SPG	BPG	PPG
1968–69	Dallas (ABA)	78		34.4	.434	.133	.812	5.1	3.6			18.9
1969–70	Dallas (ABA)	**84***		27.9	.432	.309	.785	4.4	3.2			13.8
1970–71	Texas (ABA)	42		31.3	.457	.385	.772	**7.4**	3.4			20.3
1970–71†	Utah (ABA)	44		26.4	.414	.329	.785	5.8	2.6			15.8
1971–72	Utah (ABA)	**84**		24.3	.420	.200	.795	4.7	2.8			13.0
1972–73	Utah (ABA)	**84***		30.8	**.498**	.250	.866	5.1	4.2			18.5
1973–74	Utah (ABA)	**84**		36.9	.494	.231	.875	5.2	**5.0**	1.5	.3	17.6
1974–75	Utah (ABA)	**84***		**40.6**	.491	.303	.860	4.8	4.4	1.5	**.4**	25.2
1975–76	Utah (ABA)	16		39.8	.490	.250	.859	4.5	4.7	1.7	.1	**26.2**
1975–76	St. Louis (ABA)	62		37.5	.485	**.400**	.877	4.0	**5.0**	**2.0**	.2	21.0
1976–77	Kansas City	82	82	36.8	.474		.844	3.9	4.1	1.5	.2	22.2
1977–78	Kansas City	82		32.4	.443		.854	3.3	3.8	1.3	.1	17.7
1978–79	L.A. Lakers	82*		19.3	.455		.865	1.8	1.9	.8	.1	7.4
1979–80	L.A. Lakers	6		17.7	.350	–	.857	1.8	1.2	.8	.0	5.7
1979–80	Utah	75		30.5	.447	.380	**.894**	2.9	4.0	1.2	.0	12.9
1980–81	Utah	52		22.0	.431	.282	.798	1.6	3.1	.6	.2	7.8
Career (ABA)		662		32.6	.465	.296	.830	5.0	3.9	1.6	.3	18.6
Career (NBA)		379	82	28.5	.454	.337	.854	2.8	3.4	1.1	.1	13.9
Career (overall)		1,041	82	31.1	.461	.304	.837	4.2	3.7	1.3	.2	16.8
All-Star (ABA)		4		16.8	.500	.500	.800	2.5	2.3	1.0	1.0	10.3

==== Playoffs ====
Year	Team	GP	MPG	FG%	3P%	FT%	RPG	APG	SPG	BPG	PPG
1969	Dallas (ABA)	7	28.0	.447	.000	.840	3.1	3.9			13.9
1970	Dallas (ABA)	6	32.2	.474	**.375**	.714	4.5	4.5			18.3
1971†	Utah (ABA)	**18**	31.6	.441	.333	.860	**6.1**	5.2			17.2
1972	Utah (ABA)	11	19.0	.476	.200	.862	2.2	2.4			11.5
1973	Utah (ABA)	10	36.0	**.504**	.000	**.971**	4.3	4.7			16.9
1974	Utah (ABA)	**18**	**41.5**	.474	.000	.919	6.0	6.1	1.7	.2	17.1
1975	Utah (ABA)	6	36.5	.425	–	.895	4.0	**6.8**	**2.3**	**1.0**	**23.7**
1979	L.A. Lakers	8	28.3	.481		.952	1.9	1.8	1.1	.0	11.8
Career (ABA)		76	32.8	.463	.241	.874‡	4.7	4.9	1.8	.4	16.6
Career (overall)		84	32.4	.464	.241	.880	4.4	4.6	1.7	.3	16.1

== Honors ==
- Ron Boone was inducted into the Idaho State University Hall of Fame in 1980.
- Boone was inducted into the Nebraska High School Sports Hall of Fame in 1995.
- In 1997, Boone was selected to the American Basketball Association All-Time Team.
- Boone was inducted into the Utah Sports Hall of Fame in 2000.
