= Harry Weltman =

American basketball executive (1933–2014)

Harry Weltman (May 4, 1933 – May 8, 2014) was an American basketball executive.

== Basketball career ==
Weltman served as general manager of the Spirits of St. Louis in the American Basketball Association. He was also a co-owner of that team with Ozzie and Daniel Silna. In the 1974–75 ABA season, the New York Nets defeated the Spirits 12 straight times, but then the Spirits beat the Nets 4 games to 1 in the 1975 Eastern Division Semifinals, a major upset.

Weltman later served as general manager of the Cleveland Cavaliers and the New Jersey Nets of the National Basketball Association.

On September 26, 2013, Weltman was inducted into the Greater Cleveland Sports Hall of Fame.

== Personal life ==
Weltman was a Cleveland native where he went to Glenville High School and is in their Hall of Fame. He graduated from Baldwin Wallace University where he also was inducted into their Hall of Fame. He was a finalist as a Rhodes Scholar. He attended Tufts, School of Law and Diplomacy, and left to enlist in the United States Army in Ft. Devens, Mass, where he played on the all Army Basketball Team. He was married to Rosemary Weltman and has two children, Jeff and Mandy. Jeff followed in his father's footsteps into the NBA, where he is currently the president of the Orlando Magic.

Weltman died on May 8, 2014, from complications from Alzheimer's four days after his 81st birthday.
