= Don Chaney =

American basketball coach and player

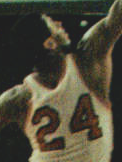
- Chaney, in the "Game of the Century", in 1968

Personal information
- Born: March 22, 1946 (age 80) Baton Rouge, Louisiana, U.S.
- Listed height: 6 ft 5 in (1.96 m)
- Listed weight: 210 lb (95 kg)

Career information
- High school: McKinley (Baton Rouge, Louisiana)
- College: Houston (1965–1968)
- NBA draft: 1968: 1st round, 12th overall pick
- Drafted by: Boston Celtics
- Playing career: 1968–1980
- Position: Shooting guard
- Number: 12, 42
- Coaching career: 1980–2004

Career history

Playing
- 1968–1975: Boston Celtics
- 1975–1976: Spirits of St. Louis
- 1976–1977: Los Angeles Lakers
- 1977–1980: Boston Celtics

Coaching
- 1980–1983: Detroit Pistons (assistant)
- 1983–1984: San Diego / Los Angeles Clippers (assistant)
- 1984–1987: Los Angeles Clippers
- 1987–1988: Atlanta Hawks (assistant)
- 1988–1992: Houston Rockets
- 1992–1993: Detroit Pistons (assistant)
- 1993–1995: Detroit Pistons
- 1995–2001: New York Knicks (assistant)
- 2001–2004: New York Knicks

Career highlights
- As player: 2× NBA champion (1969, 1974); 5× NBA All-Defensive Second Team (1972–1975, 1977); No. 24 retired by Houston Cougars; Third-team Parade All-American (1964); As coach: NBA Coach of the Year (1991)

Career ABA & NBA playing statistics
- Points: 6,663 (8.4 ppg)
- Rebounds: 3,147 (4.0 rpg)
- Assists: 1,762 (2.2 apg)
- Stats at NBA.com
- Stats at Basketball Reference

Career coaching record
- NBA: 337–494 (.406)
- Record at Basketball Reference

Donald Ray Chaney (born March 22, 1946) is an American former professional basketball player and coach, most notable for winning two championships as a player on the Boston Celtics, and winning NBA Coach of the Year while leading the Houston Rockets.

== Early life ==
Donald Ray Chaney was born on March 22, 1946, in Baton Rouge, Louisiana. He attended McKinley High School where he excelled in basketball.

== College career ==
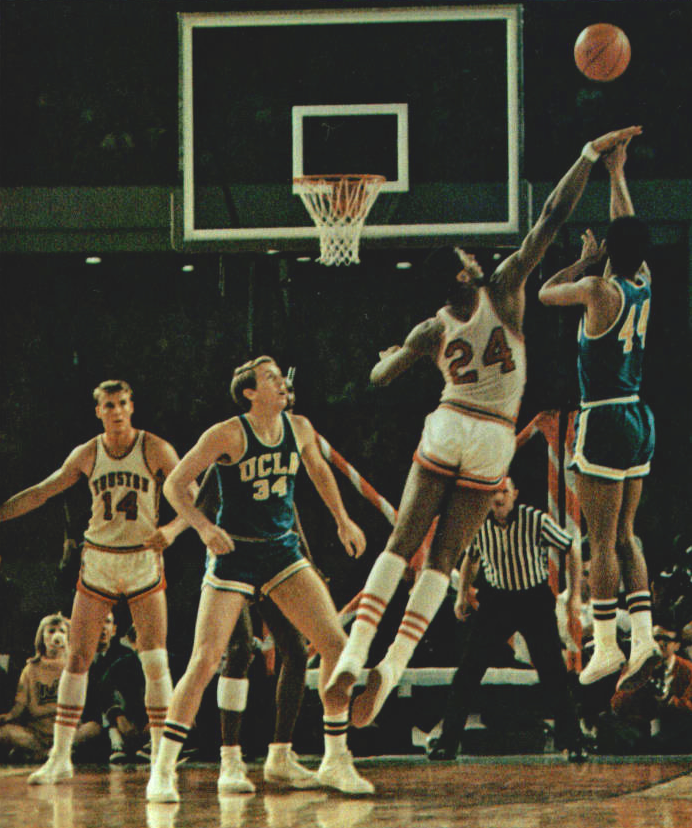
While at Houston, #24 Chaney blocks a shot against UCLA in the 1968 Game of the Century at the Astrodome

Chaney played basketball in college for the University of Houston, where he was a teammate of future Basketball Hall-of-Famer Elvin Hayes. Chaney played all 40 minutes of the famed "Game of the Century" at the Astrodome.

== Professional career ==
=== Boston Celtics (1968–1975) ===
In that year's 1968 NBA draft, Chaney became the first-round pick (12th overall) of the Boston Celtics; he was also drafted by the Houston Mavericks of the American Basketball Association.

Chaney became a champion with the Boston Celtics during his rookie year, in 1969. On February 28, 1973, Chaney set a career high in points score with 32, in a win over the Golden State Warriors. He would also help the Celtics toward winning the 1974 NBA Finals.

=== Spirits of St. Louis (1975–1976) ===
Chaney played in the ABA for one year with the Spirits of St. Louis from 1975 to 1976 due to the money offered. He suffered a torn knee early in the year and later called the experience playing in St. Louis "a lost season for me."

=== Los Angeles Lakers (1976–1977) ===
Chaney had a short two season stint with the Los Angeles Lakers from 1976 to 1977. Chaney was widely known for his defensive skills, appearing on NBA all-defensive teams five times during his career. He was also known for providing notable numbers in minutes off the bench.

=== Return to the Boston Celtics (1977–1980) ===
Chaney returned to the Boston Celtics in 1977. Chaney is the only Boston Celtic who played with both Bill Russell (1956–1969) and Larry Bird (1979–1992).

== Coaching career ==
After his playing career ended, Chaney became an assistant coach for the Detroit Pistons in 1980.

=== Los Angeles Clippers (1984–1987) ===
On March 13, 1985, Chaney was hired by the Los Angeles Clippers, replacing Jim Lynam with 21 games left in the 1984–85 season. It was noted at the time that he was just the twelfth African American head coach in the NBA (of the twelve, ten were former players, and five had played for the Celtics). Chaney went 9–12 to lead the team to an ultimate finish of 31-51 and a tie for fourth place in the Pacific Division, which actually was their best finish since 1978. The 1985 season would be the first with Chaney as head coach for a full season, which saw them draft Benoit Benjamin as the third pick that year. Chaney believed that Benjamin could eventually become a "better offensive player than Ewing". The team, composed of veteran players and fresh rookies, went 32–50. In a Western Conference with eight playoff spots for twelve teams, the Clippers finished three games short of a playoff spot. In 1986, Chaney nearly came to blows with Benjamin. During a pregame shoot-around, Benjamin showed up late and then sat on the side of the court rather than participate in practice. Chaney called Benjamin and stated that if he was one of his teammates and say he would kick him in the behind before deciding that he probably should kick him right now, although the crowd around Chaney helped calm him down.

His second full season was a disaster. Wracked with injuries, the Clippers had a 12-game losing streak in the first eighteen games of the season and did not reach ten wins until the 54th game of the season. They closed the season out on a 14-game losing streak to finish 12–70, which at the time made them the holder of the second-worst record for a season in NBA history. On April 22, 1987, he was fired to be replaced by Gene Shue.

=== Houston Rockets (1988–1992) ===
On June 13, 1988, Chaney was hired by the Houston Rockets as head coach to replace Bill Fitch, who had been fired one week ago. The Rockets had made the postseason the past four seasons but hadn't made it past the second round since 1987. In his first season, the Rockets went 45-37 and finished 5th in the Western Conference. They met the Seattle Supersonics in the First round but lost in four games. The next year saw them finish 41-41 and finish as the eight seed in the West and a four-game loss to the Los Angeles Lakers in the first round. The third season under Chaney was a tough battle. The Rockets played at .500 ball for the first half of the season but found themselves in a bind when Hakeem Olajuwon suffered a bone fracture in his right eye in January 1991 that saw him miss 25 games. By the All-Star Game break, the Rockets were 27–21. However, a tremendous March carried them mightily, as they lost only once in 15 games that month before they finished with 52 wins, the first time they had won 50 games since 1986. They finished 5th in the conference and met the Lakers in the first round. The three games were decided by point margins of two, eleven, and four, but the Lakers won each of the games to sweep the Rockets. For his efforts, Chaney was awarded the NBA Coach of the Year Award, the second Rocket to win the award.

The next season was tumultuous. They had a hot start to get the year going, winning nine of their first twelve games, but it was followed by five straight losses. At the All-Star Break, they were 25–22. On February 12, 1992, Chaney was fired with the team at 26-26. The firing came one day after a loss by the Rockets to the Minnesota Timberwolves (who had nine wins prior to the game) in overtime, in which the Rockets had led by 24 points in the third quarter and days earlier lost a game where they had led by ten points. Chaney was 164–134 as coach of the Rockets, with a .561 winning percentage that was the best in team history to that point. Owner Charlie Thomas did not put blame on Chaney, stating, "You can`t fire the team and something had to be done. Once you see that things are deteriorating, you have to do something." Assistant head coach Rudy Tomjanovich was named interim head coach.

=== Detroit Pistons (1993–1995) ===
On May 4, 1993, Chaney was hired to coach the Detroit Pistons. The Pistons had just experienced a season of turmoil under Ron Rothstein, who led the team to their first non playoff season since 1983, and Chaney (who had served as assistant coach under Rothstein that year) pledged to be a great communicator. Composed of aging superstars such as Isiah Thomas and Bill Laimbeer to go with new acquisitions such as Sean Elliott and draft pick Lindsey Hunter, the Pistons struggled after a 5–4 start. A practice scuffle between Thomas and Laimbeer saw a broken hand for Thomas and led Laimbeer to retire. A 14-game losing streak saw the team with eleven wins at the All-Star break. By the end of a 13-game losing streak to end the year, the Pistons had won just 20 games to finish with their worst record since 1980. Thomas retired after the season due to an Achilles tendon rupture.

The following season would be the last one for Chaney. In a new era without Laimbeer and Thomas, the Pistons drafted Grant Hill and retooled their lineup. While Hill would shine as an All-Star pick, the Pistons crumbled by the midpoint of the year, with a 1–13 run at one point that saw Hunter hurt before the Pistons season came to a merciful end that saw them go 1–8 to end a year with 28 wins. On April 11, 1995, Chaney was fired, with Doug Collins replacing him.

=== New York Knicks (2001–2004) ===
In the 2001–02 season, Chaney was serving as assistant head coach for the New York Knicks under Jeff Van Gundy. On December 10, 2001, Chaney became head coach of the Knicks to replace Van Gundy, who cited a "diminished focus" as a reason for resigning after 19 games. Noting the demands of owner James L. Dolan, Chaney stated that his goals were to win and make the playoffs. Contemporary reports stated that Dolan was hoping for a coach that would not only make a quality postseason run and also be media-friendly, and Chaney was perceived as potentially cultivating a more relaxed atmosphere. The team went 20–43 under Chaney as head coach and finished the season 30–52, 18 more losses than in the previous campaign, and missed the playoffs for the first time in 15 years. Chaney was retained for the next season.

The following season saw the Knicks hope that recent acquisition Antonio McDyess would help improve the team's fortunes, but a knee injury saw him miss the whole season. As such, with a lineup including Allan Houston, the Knicks started the year 2–10 and never recovered to make a serious run at a playoff berth, finishing with a 37–45 record, five games out of the eighth seed in the Eastern Conference. In December 2003, James Dolan hired Isiah Thomas as Knicks president of basketball operations and emphasized the need for the team to make the playoffs. Not long after, the Knicks traded for Stephon Marbury, a point guard they hoped would improve their 10th place standing in the Eastern Conference 38 games into the season with the NBA's highest payroll. During a January 8 game at Madison Square Garden, Knicks fans chanted "Fire Chaney!" during a loss. Thomas, noting the players' confidence in Chaney, stated that his job is to "sit back and evaluate and see where that process is going." On January 14, Chaney was fired, two hours before a game was to start. He went 72–112 (.391) as Knicks head coach, the fourth worst head coaching record in team history. The following year, Chaney stated that he regretted not getting a true opportunity to coach the team with Marbury, a quality point guard who was traded to New York only nine days before Chaney was fired. Chaney was offered a position as an assistant to Paul Silas with the Cleveland Cavaliers, which he declined, hoping to find a head coaching position elsewhere. Chaney retired in 2004.

== Personal life ==
Chaney was known for partaking in "daredevil"-esque stunts, including skydiving and racecar driving, during his coaching career.

In 2019, he was diagnosed with transthyretim amyloid cardiomyopathy, a lethal disease that disproportionately impacts African Americans. He had assumed that his symptoms of fatigue, palpitations, shortness of breath, and swollen ankles were from his playing days; but he learned that they were similar to the symptoms members of his family had experienced before their deaths from heart disease. While the disease was hereditary, his sisters and daughters tested negative for it. His wife, Jackie Chaney, served as his primary caregiver to help manage his condition.

== Career playing statistics ==
Legend
GP	Games played	GS	Games started	MPG	Minutes per game
FG%	Field goal percentage	3P%	3-point field goal percentage	FT%	Free throw percentage
RPG	Rebounds per game	APG	Assists per game	SPG	Steals per game
BPG	Blocks per game	PPG	Points per game	**Bold**	Career high
†	Won an NBA championship	*	Led the league

=== NBA/ABA ===
==== Regular season ====
Year	Team	GP	GS	MPG	FG%	3P%	FT%	RPG	APG	SPG	BPG	PPG
1968–69†	Boston	20		10.5	.319		.400	2.3	1.0			4.0
1969–70	Boston	63		13.3	.359		.752	2.4	1.1			5.0
1970–71	Boston	81		28.3	.454		.748	**5.7**	2.9			11.5
1971–72	Boston	79		28.8	.475		.773	5.0	2.6			11.9
1972–73	Boston	79		**31.5**	**.482**		.787	**5.7**	2.8			**13.1**
1973–74†	Boston	81		27.9	.464		.828	4.7	2.2	1.0	**.8**	10.4
1974–75	Boston	**82**		26.9	.428		.806	4.5	2.2	1.5	**.8**	9.5
1975–76	St. Louis (ABA)	48		30.7	.418	**.250**	.780	4.9	3.5	1.4	**.8**	9.3
1976–77	L.A. Lakers	81		29.7	.408		.745	4.1	**3.8**	**1.7**	.4	6.1
1977–78	L.A. Lakers	9		14.8	.361		.833	1.2	1.9	.9	.3	3.4
1977–78	Boston	42		16.7	.391		.846	2.5	1.2	.9	.2	5.1
1978–79	Boston	65		16.5	.420		**.857**	2.2	1.2	1.1	.2	5.9
1979–80	Boston	60	0	8.7	.354	.167	.762	1.2	.6	.5	.2	2.8
Career (NBA)		742	0	23.5	.438	.167	.776	3.9	2.1	1.2	.5	8.4
Career (overall)		790	0	23.9	.436	.200	.776	4.0	2.2	1.2	.5	8.4

==== Playoffs ====
Year	Team	GP	MPG	FG%	FT%	RPG	APG	SPG	BPG	PPG
1969†	Boston	7	3.6	.167	.750	.6	.0			.7
1972	Boston	11	24.6	**.506**	.750	3.5	2.0			8.8
1973	Boston	12	24.0	.476	.706	3.3	2.1			7.5
1974†	Boston	**18***	30.3	.461	**.820**	4.3	2.2	1.3	**.5**	9.5
1975	Boston	11	26.7	.457	.793	3.5	1.9	**1.9**	**.5**	**10.8**
1977	L.A. Lakers	11	**37.5**	.375	.727	**4.7**	**4.4**	**1.9**	.3	8.0
Career		70	26.2	.450	.775	3.6	2.2	1.7	.4	8.1

== Head coaching record ==
Legend
Regular season	G	Games coached	W	Games won	L	Games lost	W–L %	Win–loss %
Playoffs	PG	Playoff games	PW	Playoff wins	PL	Playoff losses	PW–L %	Playoff win–loss %

Team	Year	G	W	L	W–L%	Finish	PG	PW	PL	PW–L%	Result
L.A. Clippers	1984–85	21	9	12	.429	5th in Pacific	—	—	—	—	Missed playoffs
L.A. Clippers	1985–86	82	32	50	.390	4th in Pacific	—	—	—	—	Missed playoffs
L.A. Clippers	1986–87	82	12	70	.146	6th in Pacific	—	—	—	—	Missed playoffs
Houston	1988–89	82	45	37	.549	2nd in Midwest	4	1	3	.250	Lost in First round
Houston	1989–90	82	41	41	.500	5th in Midwest	4	1	3	.250	Lost in First round
Houston	1990–91	82	52	30	.634	3rd in Midwest	3	0	3	.000	Lost in First round
Houston	1991–92	52	26	26	.500	(fired)	—	—	—	—	—
Detroit	1993–94	82	20	62	.244	7th in Central	—	—	—	—	Missed playoffs
Detroit	1994–95	82	28	54	.341	7th in Central	—	—	—	—	Missed playoffs
New York	2001–02	63	20	43	.317	7th in Atlantic	—	—	—	—	Missed playoffs
New York	2002–03	82	37	45	.451	6th in Atlantic	—	—	—	—	Missed playoffs
New York	2003–04	39	15	24	.385	(fired)	—	—	—	—	—
Career		831	337	494	.406		11	2	9	.182	

== Awards ==
- 1969 NBA Finals and 1974 NBA Finals champion
- NBA All-Defensive second team (1972, 1973, 1974, 1975 and 1977)
- NBA Coach of the Year Award with the Houston Rockets for the 1990–91 season, after leading the Houston Rockets to a 50–32 record.
- Louisiana Sports Hall of Fame (1991)
- Gold medal-winning US national team at the 1994 FIBA World Championship in Toronto, assistant coach
