= 1975 ABA playoffs =

Basketball competition

Tournament details
- Dates: April 5 – May 22, 1975
- Season: 1974–75
- Teams: 8

Final positions
- Champions: Kentucky Colonels (1st title)
- Runners-up: Indiana Pacers
- Semifinalists: Denver Nuggets; Spirits of St. Louis

The 1975 ABA playoffs was the postseason tournament of the American Basketball Association's 1974–75 season. The tournament concluded with the Eastern Division champion Kentucky Colonels defeating the Western Division champion Indiana Pacers in the ABA Finals in five games.

== Background ==
The Kentucky Colonels won 22 of their final 25 regular season games to catch the New York Nets for a share of first place in the Eastern Division. The Colonels won their last ten regular season games. They also went 13–3 in the ABA playoffs.

Because the Colonels and Nets tied for first place in the Eastern Division, a special one game playoff was played to determine the division champion (and therefore the #1 seed). The Colonels hosted the game and defeated the Nets 108–99 on April 4, 1975.

The Memphis Sounds' Eastern Division 111–99 semifinal loss on the road to the Kentucky Colonels on April 13, 1975, was the final game played by the Sounds. After the season they moved to Maryland and became the Baltimore Claws.

The first round win by the Spirits of St. Louis over the New York Nets was the biggest upset of the playoffs. Not only had the Spirits finished 26 games behind the Nets in the regular season, they had also lost all 11 regular season matchups to the Nets, and by an average of 17.3 points per game. But after losing the opener of the series to stretch the losing streak to 12, the Spirits rolled off four wins in a row to claim the series.

The 1975 ABA Finals marked the second time in three years that the Kentucky Colonels and Indiana Pacers met in the ABA championship series. The Pacers edged the Colonels 4 games to 3 at the end of the 1973 ABA Playoffs.

16,622 fans attended the final playoff game of the season in Freedom Hall in Louisville, Kentucky, as the Kentucky Colonels defeated the Indiana Pacers 110–105 to win the ABA Championship.

Artis Gilmore was named Most Valuable Player of the 1975 ABA Playoffs. In Game 3, he recorded 28 rebounds while in the clinching Game 5 he had 28 points and 31 rebounds.

The 1975 Kentucky Colonels were the final team to win an ABA Championship but not move on to the NBA later.

== Bracket ==
Division Semifinals
1	Denver Nuggets	4
4	Utah Stars	2
Western Division
3	Indiana Pacers	4
2	San Antonio Spurs	2
1	Kentucky Colonels	4
4	Memphis Sounds	1
Eastern Division
3	Spirits of St. Louis	4
2	New York Nets	1

Division Finals
1	Denver Nuggets	3
3	Indiana Pacers	4
1	Kentucky Colonels	4
3	Spirits of St. Louis	1

ABA Finals
W3	Indiana Pacers	1
E1	Kentucky Colonels	4

== Eastern Division Tiebreaker Game ==
March 29

Box score

New York Nets 99, Kentucky Colonels 108
Scoring by quarter: 22–30, 30–33, 29–24, 18–21
Pts: Julius Erving 34; Rebs: Larry Kenon 9 Asts: Brian Taylor 5	Pts: Artis Gilmore 28; Rebs: Artis Gilmore 33; Asts: Louie Dampier 10
Kentucky wins Division tiebreaker

Freedom Hall, Louisville, Kentucky
Attendance: 13,672

With the division on the line (along with a pot of $25,000 for the winner of the division), Artis Gilmore practically willed the Colonels to victory, leading the team in scoring with 28 points while having 33 rebounds, which actually was more than the entire Nets team had (30). New York suffered with the departure of Billy Paultz with a groin injury that sent him off to the bench for Willie Sojourner, who Gilmore stated didn't have the confidence to take the "outside jump shot so you can back off him and be in a good position for the rebound." Julius Erving scored 34 points to lead the Nets in scoring while followed by John Williamson, who scored 29. The Colonels, who had trailed by four games to New York two weeks ago before winning nine in a row to close out the regular season, were now champions of the division.

== Division Semifinals ==
=== Eastern Division Semifinals ===
==== (1) Kentucky Colonels vs. (4) Memphis Sounds ====
April 6

Box score

Memphis Sounds 91, Kentucky Colonels 98
Scoring by quarter: 23–28, 25–24, 19–22, 24–24
Pts: George Carter 22; Rebs: Tom Owens 14; Asts: Chuck Williams 6	Pts: Artis Gilmore 25; Rebs: Artis Gilmore 20; Asts: Louie Dampier 10
Kentucky leads series, 1–0

Freedom Hall, Louisville, Kentucky
Attendance: 4,107

April 8

Box score

Memphis Sounds 105, Kentucky Colonels 119
Scoring by quarter: 24–30, 19–30, 26–30, 36–29
Pts: Carter, Williams 21 each Rebs: Tom Owens 9 Asts: Chuck Williams 5	Pts: Louie Dampier 23; Rebs: Artis Gilmore 12; Asts: Dampier, McClain 8 each
Kentucky leads series, 2–0

Freedom Hall, Louisville, Kentucky
Attendance: 4,787

April 10

Box score

Kentucky Colonels 101, Memphis Sounds 80
Scoring by quarter: 17–18, 29–18, 26–18, 29–26
Pts: Dan Issel 21; Rebs: Artis Gilmore 9 Asts: Ted McClain 5	Pts: Tom Owens 33; Rebs: Tom Owens 12; Asts: Chuck Williams 5
Kentucky leads series, 3–0

Mid-South Coliseum, Memphis, Tennessee
Attendance: 5,415

April 11

Box score

Kentucky Colonels 93, Memphis Sounds 107
Scoring by quarter: 20–27, 19–26, 31–26, 23–28
Pts: Dan Issel 26; Rebs: Artis Gilmore 12; Asts: Louie Dampier 7	Pts: Stew Johnson 25; Rebs: Johnson, Carter 11; Asts: Chuck Williams 14
Kentucky leads series, 3–1

Mid-South Coliseum, Memphis, Tennessee
Attendance: 4,771

April 13

Box score

Memphis Sounds 99, Kentucky Colonels 111
Scoring by quarter: 18–26, 26–33, 24–26, 31–26
Pts: George Carter 26; Rebs: Tom Owens 17; Asts: George Carter 6	Pts: Artis Gilmore 31; Rebs: Artis Gilmore 20; Asts: Louie Dampier 6
Kentucky wins series, 4–1

Freedom Hall, Louisville, Kentucky
Attendance: 3,543

==== (2) New York Nets vs. (3) Spirits of St. Louis ====
April 6

Box score

Spirits of St. Louis 105, New York Nets 111
Scoring by quarter: 35–21, 19–28, 27–28, 24–34
Pts: Marvin Barnes 41; Rebs: Marvin Barnes 12; Asts: Adams, Barr 6 each	Pts: Julius Erving 32; Rebs: Larry Kenon 13; Asts: Erving, Melchionni 6 each
New York leads series, 1–0

Nassau Veterans Memorial Coliseum, Uniondale, New York
Attendance: 11,607

April 9

Box score

Spirits of St. Louis 115, New York Nets 97
Scoring by quarter: 29–20, 24–18, 35–23, 27–36
Pts: Marvin Barnes 37; Rebs: Maurice Lucas 21; Asts: Maurice Lucas 7	Pts: Larry Kenon 28; Rebs: Larry Kenon 12; Asts: Bill Melchionni 7
Series tied, 1–1

Nassau Veterans Memorial Coliseum, Uniondale, New York
Attendance: 10,621

April 11

Box score

New York Nets 108, Spirits of St. Louis 113
Scoring by quarter: 27–22, 23–26, 23–28, 35–37
Pts: Julius Erving 30; Rebs: Larry Kenon 14; Asts: Julius Erving 6	Pts: Marvin Barnes 35; Rebs: Maurice Lucas 18; Asts: Mike Barr 7
St. Louis leads series, 2–1

St. Louis Arena, St. Louis, Missouri
Attendance: 6,199
Referees: Ed Middleton, Ed Rush

April 13

Box score

New York Nets 89, Spirits of St. Louis 100
Scoring by quarter: 26–24, 22–26, 21–22, 20–28
Pts: Julius Erving 35; Rebs: Larry Kenon 16; Asts: Bill Melchionni 6	Pts: Marvin Barnes 23; Rebs: Marvin Barnes 20; Asts: Maurice Lucas 6
St. Louis leads series, 3–1

St. Louis Arena, St. Louis, Missouri
Attendance: 7,719

April 15

Box score

Spirits of St. Louis 108, New York Nets 107
Scoring by quarter: 20–30, 26–30, 25–21, 37–26
Pts: Freddie Lewis 29; Rebs: Marvin Barnes 14; Asts: Mike Barr 5	Pts: Julius Erving 34; Rebs: Billy Paultz 14; Asts: Bill Melchionni 11
St. Louis wins series, 4–1

Nassau Veterans Memorial Coliseum, Uniondale, New York
Attendance: 9,664

Trailing by one late, the Spirits forced a turnover by Julius Erving and Freddie Lewis caught a pass to then shoot a 20-foot shot that went with time expiring to give the Spirits the win and end the series.

=== Western Division Semifinals ===
==== (1) Denver Nuggets vs. (4) Utah Stars ====
April 6

Box score

Utah Stars 107, Denver Nuggets 122
Scoring by quarter: 23–25, 28–28, 26–34, 30–35
Pts: Randy Denton 26; Rebs: Moses Malone 19; Asts: Al Smith 7	Pts: Ralph Simpson 20; Rebs: Mike Green 8 Asts: Taylor, Terry 6
Denver leads series, 1–0

Denver Auditorium Arena, Denver, Colorado
Attendance: 7,200

April 7

Box score

Utah Stars 120, Denver Nuggets 126
Scoring by quarter: 29–31, 26–25, 42–33, 23–37
Pts: Ron Boone 29; Rebs: Randy Denton 16; Asts: Al Smith 9	Pts: Ralph Simpson 28; Rebs: Mike Green 19; Asts: Simpson, Taylor 6 each
Denver leads series, 2–0

Denver Auditorium Arena, Denver, Colorado
Attendance: 7,298

April 9

Box score

Denver Nuggets 108, Utah Stars 122
Scoring by quarter: 32–33, 27–32, 28–31, 21–26
Pts: Jones, Calvin, Robisch 17 each Rebs: Mike Green 9 Asts: Jones, Simpson, Taylor, Terry 3 each	Pts: Moses Malone 30; Rebs: Moses Malone 32; Asts: John Roche 9
Denver leads series, 2–1

Salt Palace, Salt Lake City, Utah
Attendance: 5,694

April 11

Box score

Denver Nuggets 110, Utah Stars 132
Scoring by quarter: 20–38, 22–31, 33–34, 35–29
Pts: Dave Robisch 16; Rebs: Robisch, van Breda Kolff 8 each Asts: Mack Calvin 7	Pts: Ron Boone 30; Rebs: Moses Malone 17; Asts: John Roche 12
Series tied, 2–2

Salt Palace, Salt Lake City, Utah
Attendance: 9,106

April 12

Box score

Utah Stars 119, Denver Nuggets 130
Scoring by quarter: 33–36, 20–31, 31–33, 35–30
Pts: John Roche 27; Rebs: Randy Denton 12; Asts: John Roche 8	Pts: Dave Robisch 22; Rebs: Green, Simpson 7 each Asts: Mack Calvin 10
Denver leads series, 3–2

Denver Auditorium Arena, Denver, Colorado
Attendance: 7,498

April 14

Box score

Denver Nuggets 115, Utah Stars 113
Scoring by quarter: 23–20, 22–27, 39–37, 31–29
Pts: Ralph Simpson 28; Rebs: Mike Green 11; Asts: Ralph Simpson 4	Pts: Ron Boone 33; Rebs: Moses Malone 15; Asts: John Roche 9
Denver wins series, 4–2

Salt Palace, Salt Lake City, Utah
Attendance: 8,448

==== (2) San Antonio Spurs vs. (3) Indiana Pacers ====
April 5

Box score

Indiana Pacers 122, San Antonio Spurs 119 (OT)
Scoring by quarter: 25–27, 32–26, 24–30, 26–24, Overtime: 15–12
Pts: George McGinnis 32; Rebs: George McGinnis 20; Asts: George McGinnis 7	Pts: James Silas 25; Rebs: George Gervin 23; Asts: James Silas 13
Indiana leads series, 1–0

HemisFair Arena, San Antonio, Texas
Attendance: 8,529

April 7

Box score

Indiana Pacers 98, San Antonio Spurs 93
Scoring by quarter: 12–23, 28–20, 32–25, 26–25
Pts: George McGinnis 33; Rebs: Len Elmore 16; Asts: McGinnis, Buse 7 each	Pts: George Gervin 38; Rebs: Swen Nater 20; Asts: James Silas 7
Indiana leads series, 2–0

HemisFair Arena, San Antonio, Texas
Attendance: 7,643

April 10

Box score

San Antonio Spurs 103, Indiana Pacers 113 (OT)
Scoring by quarter: 28–32, 26–24, 20–24, 23–17, Overtime: 6–16
Pts: George Gervin 37; Rebs: Swen Nater 14; Asts: James Silas 11	Pts: George McGinnis 42; Rebs: George McGinnis 24; Asts: George McGinnis 9
Indiana leads series, 3–0

Market Square Arena, Indianapolis, Indiana
Attendance: 12,217

April 12

Box score

San Antonio Spurs 110, Indiana Pacers 109
Scoring by quarter: 31–24, 27–26, 26–31, 26–28
Pts: George Gervin 29; Rebs: Swen Nater 22; Asts: James Silas 10	Pts: George McGinnis 51; Rebs: George McGinnis 17; Asts: George McGinnis 10
Indiana leads series, 3–1

Market Square Arena, Indianapolis, Indiana
Attendance: 17,389
Referees: Ed Middleton, John Vanak

The Spurs held dominion over the game (trailing just once) but needed late heroics to stave off elimination. San Antonio led by eight at halftime and even led 68–59 four minutes into the third quarter. But Indiana went on a 10–2 run in two minutes to trail by just one before the teams traded points to make it 84–81 San Antonio before the final quarter started. McGinnis tied the game for the first time with a layup at 91–91 while Billy Knight tied the game again with 4:37 to go at 99–99. With little time remaining, McGinnis was fouled and made his free throws to give Indiana the lead at 109–108. He then had a chance to make a shot to increase the lead, but Swen Nater got the rebound to set up the inbound for San Antonio. George Gervin hit a 20-foot shot from behind the key to pull San Antonio ahead with less than five seconds remaining. McGinnis tried to drive a layup in heavy traffic, but the ball bounced over the edge for Nater to pick off and kill the rest of the clock. George Gervin led the Spurs in scoring with 29 while Swen Nater had 22 rebounds. George McGinnis powered the Pacers with a triple-double of 51 points, 17 assists and 10 rebounds. It was the first and only 50-point triple double in NBA/ABA playoff history for 42 years.

April 14

Box score

Indiana Pacers 117, San Antonio Spurs 123
Scoring by quarter: 29–37, 32–30, 22–26, 34–30
Pts: George McGinnis 40; Rebs: George McGinnis 14; Asts: George McGinnis 8	Pts: George Gervin 42; Rebs: George Gervin 17; Asts: James Silas 13
Indiana leads series, 3–2

HemisFair Arena, San Antonio, Texas
Attendance: 10,986

April 16

Box score

San Antonio Spurs 100, Indiana Pacers 115
Scoring by quarter: 29–28, 21–36, 24–24, 26–27
Pts: George Gervin 34; Rebs: Swen Nater 19; Asts: Swen Nater 6	Pts: Billy Knight 33; Rebs: George McGinnis 23; Asts: George McGinnis 14
Indiana wins series, 4–2

Market Square Arena, Indianapolis, Indiana
Attendance: 15,675

== Division Finals ==
=== Western Division Finals ===
==== (1) Denver Nuggets vs. (3) Indiana Pacers ====
April 20

Box score

Indiana Pacers 128, Denver Nuggets 131
Scoring by quarter: 28–34, 29–31, 33–28, 38–28
Pts: George McGinnis 39; Rebs: George McGinnis 22; Asts: McGinnis, Joyce 8 each	Pts: Ralph Simpson 29; Rebs: Mike Green 13; Asts: Mack Calvin 9
Denver leads series, 1–0

Denver Auditorium Arena, Denver, Colorado
Attendance: 7,444

April 22

Box score

Indiana Pacers 131, Denver Nuggets 124
Scoring by quarter: 25–26, 41–28, 25–28, 40–42
Pts: Billy Knight 44; Rebs: Darnell Hillman 14; Asts: George McGinnis 9	Pts: Ralph Simpson 29; Rebs: Mike Green 10; Asts: Ralph Simpson 8
Series tied, 1–1

Denver Auditorium Arena, Denver, Colorado
Attendance: 7,491

April 24

Box score

Denver Nuggets 112, Indiana Pacers 118
Scoring by quarter: 36–29, 27–30, 30–25, 19–34
Pts: Ralph Simpson 30; Rebs: Dave Robisch 12; Asts: Ralph Simpson 7	Pts: George McGinnis 33; Rebs: George McGinnis 21; Asts: George McGinnis 14
Indiana leads series, 2–1

Market Square Arena, Indianapolis, Indiana
Attendance: 15,496

April 25

Box score

Denver Nuggets 126, Indiana Pacers 109
Scoring by quarter: 31–29, 30–35, 33–20, 32–25
Pts: Mike Green 32; Rebs: Bobby Jones 20; Asts: Ralph Simpson 8	Pts: Darnell Hillman 34; Rebs: George McGinnis 10; Asts: McGinnis, Knight 8 each
Series tied, 2–2

Market Square Arena, Indianapolis, Indiana
Attendance: 17,389

April 27

Box score

Indiana Pacers 109, Denver Nuggets 90
Scoring by quarter: 22–22, 32–26, 25–29, 30–13
Pts: George McGinnis 33; Rebs: Billy Knight 10; Asts: Don Buse 5	Pts: Mike Green 20; Rebs: Bobby Jones 10; Asts: Ralph Simpson 8
Indiana leads series, 3–2

Denver Auditorium Arena, Denver, Colorado
Attendance: 7,483

April 30

Box score

Denver Nuggets 104, Indiana Pacers 99
Scoring by quarter: 25–24, 19–22, 36–31, 24–22
Pts: Mike Green 31; Rebs: Bobby Jones 11; Asts: Jones, Calvin, Simpson, Beck 3 each	Pts: George McGinnis 26; Rebs: George McGinnis 14; Asts: George McGinnis 10
Series tied, 3–3

Market Square Arena, Indianapolis, Indiana
Attendance: 17,421

May 3

Box score

Indiana Pacers 104, Denver Nuggets 96
Scoring by quarter: 20–24, 33–25, 25–28, 26–19
Pts: George McGinnis 40; Rebs: George McGinnis 23; Asts: George McGinnis 8	Pts: Bobby Jones 20; Rebs: Bobby Jones 15; Asts: Ralph Simpson 6
Indiana wins series, 4–3

Denver Auditorium Arena, Denver, Colorado
Attendance: 7,401

=== Eastern Division Finals ===
==== (1) Kentucky Colonels vs. (3) Spirits of St. Louis ====
April 21

Box score

Spirits of St. Louis 109, Kentucky Colonels 112
Scoring by quarter: 28–22, 30–30, 23–34, 28–26
Pts: Freddie Lewis 35; Rebs: Maurice Lucas 19; Asts: Lucas, Adams 6 each	Pts: Louie Dampier 27; Rebs: Artis Gilmore 17; Asts: Louie Dampier 15
Kentucky leads series, 1–0

Freedom Hall, Louisville, Kentucky
Attendance: 6,612

April 23

Box score

Spirits of St. Louis 103, Kentucky Colonels 108
Scoring by quarter: 27–32, 20–22, 23–28, 33–26
Pts: Marvin Barnes 43; Rebs: Marvin Barnes 17; Asts: Maurice Lucas 6	Pts: Ted McClain 24; Rebs: Artis Gilmore 15; Asts: Louie Dampier 8
Kentucky leads series, 2–0

Freedom Hall, Louisville, Kentucky
Attendance: 8,422

April 25

Box score

Kentucky Colonels 97, Spirits of St. Louis 103
Scoring by quarter: 24–34, 25–19, 25–27, 23–23
Pts: Dan Issel 31; Rebs: Artis Gilmore 18; Asts: Louie Dampier 9	Pts: Freddie Lewis 32; Rebs: Maurice Lucas 20; Asts: Don Adams 7
Kentucky leads series, 2–1

St. Louis Arena, St. Louis, Missouri
Attendance: 10,142

April 27

Box score

Kentucky Colonels 117, Spirits of St. Louis 98
Scoring by quarter: 30–31, 30–27, 26–27, 31–13
Pts: Artis Gilmore 33; Rebs: Artis Gilmore 16; Asts: Ted McClain 11	Pts: Marvin Barnes 24; Rebs: Maurice Lucas 19; Asts: Lucas, Barr 5 each
Kentucky leads series, 3–1

St. Louis Arena, St. Louis, Missouri
Attendance: 11,688
Referees: Ed Rush, Jess Kersey

St. Louis led by ten in the second quarter but Freddie Lewis suffered a sprained ankle that knocked him out of the game and the series as Kentucky rallied back to take a 3–1 series lead.

April 28

Box score

Spirits of St. Louis 103, Kentucky Colonels 123
Scoring by quarter: 27–33, 19–24, 36–37, 21–29
Pts: Marvin Barnes 35; Rebs: Maurice Lucas 11; Asts: Mike Barr 5	Pts: Artis Gilmore 29; Rebs: Artis Gilmore 20; Asts: Louie Dampier 12
Kentucky wins series, 4–1

Freedom Hall, Louisville, Kentucky
Attendance: 8,726

== ABA Finals: (E1) Kentucky Colonels vs. (W3) Indiana Pacers ==
May 13

Box score

Indiana Pacers 94, Kentucky Colonels 120
Scoring by quarter: 21–27, 24–29, 28–27, 21–37
Pts: George McGinnis 35; Rebs: George McGinnis 12; Asts: George McGinnis 9	Pts: Artis Gilmore 26; Rebs: Dan Issel 19; Asts: Jones, McClain 6 each
Kentucky leads series, 1–0

Freedom Hall, Louisville, Kentucky
Attendance: 14,368

Strangely, due to Freedom Hall likely already being booked, the ABA Finals was delayed for several days, which led to both teams in the Pacers (10 days) and Colonels (14 days) being considerably relaxed. In tune to ABA promotional wizardry, select Pacers fans even took interest of a package deal that offered a ticket, food and drink to go with bus transportation down Interstate 65 to Louisville for just $17.50. Kentucky played with domination over Indiana, holding them to 37 percent shooting and outscoring 37-21 while the bench held firm even when Artis Gilmore was taken out for a time after getting his fifth foul. On the promotional side, the Pacers being held to under 100 points meant a free hamburger for every person to have bought a ticket (14,368).

May 15

Box score

Indiana Pacers 93, Kentucky Colonels 95
Scoring by quarter: 19–27, 31–18, 18–26, 25–24
Pts: George McGinnis 30; Rebs: George McGinnis 16; Asts: Don Buse 7	Pts: Dan Issel 22; Rebs: Artis Gilmore 15; Asts: Roberts, Dampier, Jones 4 each
Kentucky leads series, 2–0

Freedom Hall, Louisville, Kentucky
Attendance: 13,212
Referees: Ed Rush, Norm Drucker

A rough first quarter (missing 16 shots) for Indiana meant that the Colonels had an early lead in the first half, but the Pacers went on a 23–8 run to lead by five at halftime. The Colonels eventually narrowed the lead down by the end of the third quarter to three and even led by six in the final quarter before the two teams tightened. The game was tied at 93 on a George McGinnis shot with 46 seconds to play. With twelve seconds remaining, a Pacer turnover gave the Colonels the ball. Louie Dampier got the ball to Dan Issel, who then got the ball to Artis Gilmore to get the inside shot to give Kentucky the lead. Billy Keller tried a desperation shot from 40 feet out that had gone in, but the referees ruled that the shot was released after the buzzer while the Pacers contended that the clock did not start in time. The Pacers filed a protest with the league asking for a replay.

May 17

Box score

Kentucky Colonels 109, Indiana Pacers 101
Scoring by quarter: 31–30, 25–21, 17–30, 36–20
Pts: Artis Gilmore 41; Rebs: Artis Gilmore 28; Asts: Ted McClain 7	Pts: Billy Knight 28; Rebs: Billy Knight 12; Asts: Knight, Buse 5 each
Kentucky leads series, 3–0

Market Square Arena, Indianapolis, Indiana
Attendance: 17,388
Referees: Ed Middleton, John Vanak

A 41-point performance by Artis Gilmore lifted the Colonels to victory after being down by eight to start the final quarter (with a 92–83 game with eight minutes to go). Dan Issel scored seven straight points to cut the deficit before Louie Dampier tied it on a three and Gilmore hit a layup to pull the Colonels ahead as they held on for the final three minutes.

May 19

Box score

Kentucky Colonels 112, Indiana Pacers 121
Scoring by quarter: 18–19, 26–22, 25–26, 17–27
Pts: Dan Issel 26; Rebs: Artis Gilmore 18; Asts: Louie Dampier 6	Pts: George McGinnis 22; Rebs: George McGinnis 21; Asts: George McGinnis 6
Kentucky leads series, 3–1

Market Square Arena, Indianapolis, Indiana
Attendance: 14,589
Referees: Ed Rush, Norm Drucker

Prior to the game, the request to replay Game 2 was denied by the league. The Pacers, facing elimination, managed to turn a 73–72 lead with nine minutes to go into an insurmountable one with shots from Billy Keller and others to go up 82–76 with six minutes to go.

May 22

Box score

Indiana Pacers 105, Kentucky Colonels 110
Scoring by quarter: 29–29, 19–25, 28–26, 29–30
Pts: Billy Knight 40; Rebs: McGinnis, Elmore 11 each Asts: George McGinnis 9	Pts: Artis Gilmore 28; Rebs: Artis Gilmore 31; Asts: Louie Dampier 12
Kentucky wins series, 4–1

Freedom Hall, Louisville, Kentucky
Attendance: 16,622
Referees:
- Jack Madden
- John Vanak

After eight years of frustration (which saw them hire seven head coaches) and two prior losses in the ABA Finals, the Colonels closed out Game 5 with a victory (their 22nd in the last 25 games combined) to win the championship. Indiana had the lead just two times as Kentucky controlled the game despite not leading by more than nine at any point, doing so with a fastbreak offense that did not waver. The Pacers did threaten late by narrowing it to 100–97 with 3:19 to go, but Marv Robers and McClain made quick baskets to keep a steady lead. Gilmore shot two free throws with under twenty seconds to go to fully clinch the victory.

Ted McClain had fifteen steals and Artis Gilmore had 31 rebounds, each being league records for a postseason game. The Game 5 victory is the first (and so far only) time a team from the commonwealth of Kentucky has won a professional championship.

Along with both head coaches (Hubie Brown and Bobby Leonard), five players in the series have since been inducted into the Naismith Basketball Hall of Fame: Louie Dampier, Dan Issel, Artis Gilmore, Roger Brown, and George McGinnis.

George McGinnis finished his postseason run with 581 points scored in eighteen total games, setting a new record for most points scored in a postseason by any basketball player. In addition to being the most scored for an ABA postseason, it was not surpassed by any player until Larry Bird in the 1984 postseason. McGinnis was the first and only NBA/ABA player to lead the entire postseason in points, assists, and rebounds until Nikola Jokić accomplished the feat in the 2023 NBA Playoffs.

The Colonels issued a challenge to the NBA champion Golden State Warriors and even offered money, but the NBA refused. True to the word of team co-owner Ellie Brown, the Colonel championship ring was inscribed with "World Champions" on the front.

== Statistical leaders ==
Category	Total			Average			
Category	Player	Team	Total	Player	Team	Avg.	Games played
Points	George McGinnis	Indiana Pacers	581	George Gervin	San Antonio Spurs	34.0	6
Rebounds	George McGinnis	Indiana Pacers	286	Artis Gilmore	Kentucky Colonels	17.6	15
Assists	George McGinnis	Indiana Pacers	148	James Silas	San Antonio Spurs	10.0	6
Steals	Don Buse	Indiana Pacers	45	Don Buse	Indiana Pacers	2.5	18
Blocks	Len Elmore	Indiana Pacers	39	Billy Paultz	New York Nets	3.2	5

=== Total leaders ===
Points

1. George McGinnis - 581
2. Billy Knight - 434
3. Artis Gilmore - 362
4. Marvin Barnes - 308
5. Dan Issel - 304

Rebounds

1. George McGinnis - 286
2. Artis Gilmore - 264
3. Billy Knight - 160
4. Maurice Lucas - 147
5. Len Elmore - 145

Assists

1. George McGinnis - 148
2. Louie Dampier - 113
3. Ted McClain - 87
4. Don Buse - 80
5. Ralph Simpson - 74

Minutes

1. Billy Knight - 763
2. George McGinnis - 731
3. Artis Gilmore - 679
4. Louie Dampier - 604
5. Kevin Joyce - 593
