= M. L. Carr =

American basketball player and coach (born 1951)

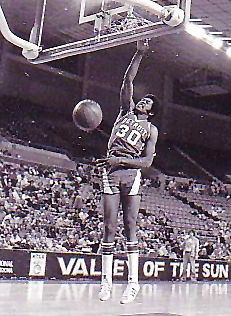
- Carr with the Detroit Pistons in 1977

Personal information
- Born: January 9, 1951 (age 75) Wallace, North Carolina, U.S.
- Listed height: 6 ft 6 in (1.98 m)
- Listed weight: 205 lb (93 kg)

Career information
- High school: Wallace-Rose Hill (Teachey, North Carolina)
- College: Guilford (1969–1973)
- NBA draft: 1973: 5th round, 76th overall pick
- Drafted by: Kansas City–Omaha Kings
- Playing career: 1973–1985
- Position: Small forward
- Number: 30
- Coaching career: 1995–1997

Career history

Playing
- 1973–1974: Hamilton Pat Pavers
- 1974: Scranton Apollos
- 1975: Israel Sabras
- 1975–1976: Spirits of St. Louis
- 1976–1979: Detroit Pistons
- 1979–1985: Boston Celtics

Coaching
- 1995–1997: Boston Celtics

Career highlights
- 2× NBA champion (1981, 1984); NBA All-Defensive Second Team (1979); ABA All-Rookie First Team (1976); NBA steals leader (1979); EPBL champion (1975); EPBL Most Valuable Player (1975); NAIA champion (1973)

Career ABA and NBA statistics
- Points: 6,759 (10.0 ppg)
- Rebounds: 3,054 (4.5 rpg)
- Assists: 1,336 (2.0 apg)
- Stats at NBA.com
- Stats at Basketball Reference

Michael Leon Carr (born January 9, 1951) is an American former professional basketball player, coach, and executive. He played in the National Basketball Association (NBA) for nine seasons with the Detroit Pistons and Boston Celtics. He won two NBA championships with the Celtics in 1981 and 1984. He also played in the Eastern Basketball Association, European Professional Basketball League, and American Basketball Association. After retiring from playing, Carr returned to the Celtics as general manager during the 1994–95 season and head coach from 1995 to 1997.

== Playing career ==
In Teachey, North Carolina, Carr was the first African-American member of Wallace-Rose Hill High School's basketball team. Afterwards, he played four years at Guilford College in Greensboro, North Carolina, and won the NAIA championship in 1973. He was selected by the Kansas City Kings of the National Basketball Association with the seventh pick of the fifth round of the 1973 NBA draft, though he never played for the team. He subsequently signed with the Kentucky Colonels but was one of the final roster cuts the Colonels made in camp, and was released.

Carr spent the 1973–74 season with the Hamilton Pat Pavers of the Eastern Basketball Association (EBA) where he averaged 15.0 points and 7.2 rebounds per game. He started the following season with the Scranton Apollos but departed in December 1974 to join the European Professional Basketball League (EPBL). Carr played in Israel for the American-owned Israel Sabras in the short-lived EPBL. For leading his team to the championship, leading the league in scoring, and emerging second in rebounding, he was named Most Valuable Player.

During the 1975–76 ABA season, Carr played for the Spirits of St. Louis, averaging 12.2 points and 6.2 rebounds per game, and was named to the ABA's All-Rookie Team. The Spirits of St. Louis were one of two ABA teams (the Colonels being the other) which did not join the NBA in the ABA–NBA merger, and as a result he joined the NBA as a member of the Detroit Pistons from 1976–79. Upon his arrival in Detroit, he famously delivered a one-liner "Hey, since I'm here, I'm going to change my name from M. L. Carr to Abdul Automobile." During the 1976-77 NBA season, Carr played all 82 games and averaged the second most points of any Piston at 13.3, behind only Bob Lanier. The 1977 NBA Playoffs marked Carr's first postseason appearance, though Detroit, then in the Western Conference, were eliminated in the first round by the Golden State Warriors. On December 27, 1978, Carr set a career high with 36 points scored in a win against the Houston Rockets.

After being selected to the All-Defense second team at the conclusion of the 1979 season, for leading the league in steals at a career best 2.5 steals per game, Carr was signed as a free agent by the rebuilding Boston Celtics. Pistons coach Dick Vitale responded by saying, "We just had the heart and soul ripped from our team." The Carr acquisition was one of the four major additions which immediately propelled the Celtics back to the top of the NBA standings after finishing near the bottom the previous season, along with majority owner Harry Mangurian, head coach Bill Fitch and rookie forward Larry Bird. Carr was instrumental in leading the Celtics' defense past the favored Philadelphia 76ers in the 1981 Eastern Conference Finals, on the way to Boston's 14th NBA championship. Playing for the Celtics until 1985, Carr averaged 9.7 points and 4.3 rebounds per game during his NBA career.

Carr is well known for the steal and dunk he made in overtime of Game 4 of the 1984 NBA Finals versus the Lakers in Los Angeles, which sealed victory for Boston. Eventually, he won another title for them. Carr was also famous for waving a towel during crucial situations to fire up the Celtics.

== Coaching career ==
Carr later became the general manager of the Celtics in 1994. He later took over as coach for the 1995–96 and 1996–97 seasons. In his last year as coach, the Celtics had the worst record in team history, winning just 15 games and losing 67 in a tactical effort to get a stronger draft position and poise the team for a comeback under famed college coach Rick Pitino. He was replaced at the end of season by Pitino, who was unable to restore the team to the glory of Carr's playing days. After the 1997 season, Carr became the Celtics' director of Corporate Development.

Carr later became president of the WNBA's Charlotte Sting as part of a failed attempt to become the owner of an expansion NBA team in Charlotte, North Carolina, along with Steve Belkin and former teammate Larry Bird. Carr was given a small investment stake in the Charlotte Bobcats when Bob Johnson was selected to own the NBA franchise in Charlotte. Subsequently, Johnson sold the team to end Carr's relationship with the club.

Carr and his wife, Sylvia live in Massachusetts, where he is a partner of New Technology Ventures, a tech-focused venture capital firm based in Newton.

== Coaching record ==
Legend
Regular season	G	Games coached	W	Games won	L	Games lost	W–L %	Win–loss %
Playoffs	PG	Playoff games	PW	Playoff wins	PL	Playoff losses	PW–L %	Playoff win–loss %

Team	Year	G	W	L	W–L%	Finish	PG	PW	PL	PW–L%	Result
Boston	1995–96	82	33	49	.402	5th in Atlantic	—	—	—	—	Missed playoffs
Boston	1996–97	82	15	67	.183	7th in Atlantic	—	—	—	—	Missed playoffs
Career		164	48	116	.293		—	—	—	—	

== NBA career statistics ==
Legend
GP	Games played	GS	Games started	MPG	Minutes per game
FG%	Field goal percentage	3P%	3-point field goal percentage	FT%	Free throw percentage
RPG	Rebounds per game	APG	Assists per game	SPG	Steals per game
BPG	Blocks per game	PPG	Points per game	**Bold**	Career high
†	Won an NBA championship	*	Led the league

=== Regular season ===
Year	Team	GP	GS	MPG	FG%	3P%	FT%	RPG	APG	SPG	BPG	PPG
1975–76	St. Louis (ABA)	74	–	29.4	.483	.375	.665	6.2	3.0	1.7	0.6	12.2
1976–77	Detroit	**82**	–	32.2	.476	–	.735	**7.7**	2.2	2.0	**0.7**	13.3
1977–78	Detroit	79	–	32.4	.455	–	.738	7.1	2.3	1.9	0.3	12.4
1978–79	Detroit	80	–	**40.1**	**.514**	–	.743	7.4	**3.3**	**2.5***	0.6	**18.7**
1979–80	Boston	**82**	7	24.3	.474	.293	.739	4.0	1.9	1.5	0.4	11.1
1980–81†	Boston	41	7	16.0	.449	.071	.791	2.0	1.4	0.7	0.4	6.0
1981–82	Boston	56	**27**	23.1	.450	.294	.707	2.7	2.3	1.2	0.4	8.1
1982–83	Boston	77	0	11.5	.429	.158	.741	1.8	0.9	0.6	0.1	4.3
1983–84†	Boston	60	1	9.8	.409	.200	.875	1.3	0.8	0.3	0.1	3.1
1984–85	Boston	47	0	8.4	.416	**.391**	**1.000**	0.9	0.5	0.4	0.1	3.2
Career		678	42	24.2	.472	.275	.737	4.5	2.0	1.4	0.4	10.0

=== Playoffs ===
Year	Team	GP	GS	MPG	FG%	3P%	FT%	RPG	APG	SPG	BPG	PPG
1977	Detroit	3	–	**37.3**	.387	–	.571	**5.7**	2.0	0.3	**1.0**	**9.3**
1980	Boston	9	–	19.1	.400	.400	.667	3.7	1.2	0.7	0.1	9.1
1981†	Boston	**17**	–	16.9	**.416**	.000	.750	1.5	0.8	0.6	0.4	6.0
1982	Boston	12	–	25.4	.352	.000	.652	3.6	**2.3**	**0.9**	0.1	7.4
1983	Boston	3	–	7.3	.250	.000	**1.000**	0.3	0.0	0.7	0.0	2.0
1984†	Boston	16	–	5.1	.406	.333	.909	0.5	0.3	0.4	0.0	2.4
1985	Boston	7	0	3.4	.267	**.500**	–	0.3	0.1	0.1	0.0	1.3
Career		67	?	15.0	.382	.227	.714	1.9	1.0	0.6	0.1	5.3
