= Steve Green (basketball) =

American basketball player (born 1953)

Personal information
- Born: October 4, 1953 (age 73) Madison, Indiana, U.S.
- Listed height: 6 ft 7 in (2.01 m)
- Listed weight: 220 lb (100 kg)

Career information
- High school: Silver Creek (Sellersburg, Indiana)
- College: Indiana (1972–1975)
- NBA draft: 1975: 2nd round, 30th overall pick
- Drafted by: Chicago Bulls
- Playing career: 1975–1980
- Position: Small forward
- Number: 34, 42, 24

Career history
- 1975: Utah Stars
- 1975–1976: Spirits of St. Louis
- 1976–1979: Indiana Pacers
- 1979–1980: Stella Azzurra Roma

Career highlights
- Third-team All-American – NABC, UPI (1975)
- Stats at NBA.com
- Stats at Basketball Reference

Steven Michael Green (born October 4, 1953) is an American former professional basketball player. He was a 6-foot-7-inch (2.01 m), 220-pound (100 kg) small forward. Green attended Silver Creek High School in Sellersburg, Indiana where he was coached by his father.

== Collegiate career ==
Green played college basketball for the Indiana Hoosiers. He was hall of fame coach Bob Knight's first recruit at Indiana University. The hoosiers wen 76-12 during his time there. During his four years he averaged 14.5 points per game on 54% shooting.

== Professional career ==
Green was selected by both the Utah Stars in the 1975 American Basketball Association Draft and by the Chicago Bulls with the 12th pick of the second round in the 1975 NBA draft. In 1975–76 he played with the Utah Stars and Spirits of St. Louis, with combined averages of 9.1 points, 3.7 rebounds and 1.2 assists per game. His NBA career consisted of three seasons with the Indiana Pacers from 1976 to 1979. He holds combined ABA/NBA career averages of 4.6 points and 2.0 rebounds per game. After his NBA career he played for one season in Italy.

== Personal life ==
Green entered at the Indiana University School of Dentistry in 1980 and has been practicing dentistry since 1984. His practice is currently located in Fishers, Indiana.
