= Donald Schupak =

Donald Schupak is a New York business executive, investor, philanthropist, and attorney who is best known for his involvement with the Spirits of St. Louis during the 1976 ABA-NBA merger. The purchase of the Spirits by the NBA including Schupak's resulting ownership interest was called the best sports deal of the century by Sports Illustrated. He has served as chairman, chief executive officer, chief operating officer and strategy consultant for a number of public and private companies, including Horn & Hardart and IBM.

Schupak is a founder and senior managing member of SGI MB LLC, a New York City-based merchant bank and registered broker dealer.

== The Spirits of St. Louis ==
In June 1976 the American Basketball Association owners agreed, in return for the Spirits of St. Louis ceasing operations, to pay the St. Louis owners (primarily Ozzie and Daniel Silna) $2.2 million in cash up front in addition to a 1/7 share of the four remaining teams' television revenues in perpetuity. Those teams, formerly of the ABA, are the Denver Nuggets, Indiana Pacers, New York Nets and San Antonio Spurs. As the NBA's popularity exploded in the 1980s and 1990s, the league's television rights were sold to CBS and then NBC, and additional deals were struck with the TNT and TBS cable networks; league television revenue soared into the hundreds of millions of dollars. Over the past 25 years, the Silnas have collected approximately $300 million from the NBA, despite the fact that the Spirits never played an NBA game. The Silnas continue to receive checks from the NBA on a yearly basis, representing a 4/7 share of the television money that would normally go to any NBA franchise, or roughly two percent of the entire league's TV money. Thanks to their deal during the ABA-NBA merger the Silnas made millions through 1980s and at least $4.4 million per year through 1990s. From 1999 through 2002 the deal netted the Spirits' owners at least $12.53 million per year; from 2003 to 2006 their take was at least $15.6 million per year. The two Silna brothers each get 45% of that television revenue per year and Schupak receives 10%. They credit their terrific deal to planning they had done ahead of the merger for the Virginia Squires owners; the Silnas had expected the Spirits and Colonels to enter the NBA but for the ailing Squires to be left out, and the Silnas thought up the television revenue deal as a way to treat the Squires' owners fairly if the Squires did not join the NBA with the other ABA teams.

== The Leadership and Public Service High School (LPSHS) ==
In the 1990s, Schupak partnered with the New York City Board of Education and the Maxwell School of Citizenship and Public Affairs and founded the Leadership and Public Service High School (LPSHS). The high school has since graduated more than 5,000 students

== SportsCastr ==
In 2017, Schupak reunited with former NBA commissioner David Stern to help launch SportsCastr.

== Awards and honors ==
In 2014, Schupak was given the George Arents Award by Syracuse University, the school's highest alumni honor.
