= Spirits of St. Louis =

- Conference: Eastern Conference
- Division: East Division
- Founded: 1967
- History: Houston Mavericks; 1967–1969; Carolina Cougars; 1969–1974; Spirits of St. Louis; 1974–1976; Utah Rockies (proposed)
- Arena: St. Louis Arena
- Location: St. Louis, Missouri
- Team colors: Burnt orange, white, black
- Team manager: Harry Weltman
- Head coach: Bob MacKinnon (1974–1975); Rod Thorn (1975); Joe Mullaney (1976)
- Ownership: Harry Weltman; Donald Schupak; Ozzie and Daniel Silna
- Championships: None

The Spirits of St. Louis were a basketball franchise based in St. Louis that played in the American Basketball Association (ABA) from 1974 to 1976. This was the third and last city of a franchise that had begun as a charter member in 1967 as the Houston Mavericks before a shift to the Carolinas in 1969 to play as the Cougars. They were one of two teams still in existence at the end of the ABA that did not survive the league's merger with the National Basketball Association (NBA). They were a member of the ABA in its last two seasons, 1974–75 and 1975–76, while playing their home games at St. Louis Arena. Under terms of the ABA–NBA merger, the owners of the Spirits continued to receive a portion of NBA television revenue until 2014, when a revised agreement was reached with the league.

== History ==
After the 1973–74 season, Carolina Cougars owner Tedd Munchak traded several players and told his team president Carl Scheer and head coach Larry Brown to seek employment elsewhere. While the Cougars had been very successful on the court, there was no chance of them being included in any merger with the NBA. The Cougars were a regional franchise that split their games between Greensboro, Charlotte, and Raleigh, North Carolina. Regional franchises were not considered viable, and none of the Cougars' home cities were large enough on their own to support a team.

On July 17, 1974, Munchak sold the team for $1.5 million ($500,000 upfront) to a New York group led by Harry Weltman, lawyer Donald Schupak and his client, the Silna brothers (Ozzie, Daniel); the group had sought to buy the Detroit Pistons in 1973 but declined to meet the asking price. Weltman was announced as team president, along with plans to move the team to St. Louis and play as the Spirits of St. Louis in the St. Louis Arena. Weltman and St. Louis Blues owner Sidney Solomon had considered many team names, including the St. Louis Arches (after the Gateway Arch in St. Louis) and the St. Louis Cardinals (after the baseball team and football team there at the time). Ultimately, the teamed was named the Spirits of St. Louis after the Spirit of St. Louis, a plane which Charles Lindbergh flew solo on a transatlantic flight. The plane is also featured in the team's logo. Marvin Barnes was signed for a $2 million multi-year contract on that same day. However, only a few players from the 1973-74 Cougars suited up for the 1974-75 Spirits, making the Spirits essentially an expansion team.

The Spirits played in a city that was just six years removed from NBA basketball, having lost the Hawks to Atlanta after the 1967–68 season. They were a colorful team featuring a number of players, both on and off the court, who were fairly successful in their basketball careers. Among them were Moses Malone, acquired during their second and final season, who went on to a long and successful career in the NBA, culminating in enshrinement in the Basketball Hall of Fame. Maurice Lucas spent most of his time in the ABA as a Spirit, then later became an all-star in the NBA with the Portland Trail Blazers. Other well-known players that played for the team included former Boston Celtics sixth man Don Chaney, future Celtics head coach M. L. Carr, and Ron Boone, who held the record for consecutive games played in pro basketball for many years. One of the most colorful players on the team was Barnes, famous for stories about his off-court behavior and lack of understanding of time zones.

A couple of off-court personalities from the team became well known as well. One of the coaches in 1975 was former NBA player Rod Thorn, who became the NBA's vice president of basketball operations (in essence, the league's chief disciplinarian and the number-two man behind commissioner David Stern) for a number of years. On radio, the team featured Bob Costas as its play-by-play announcer on KMOX. Costas would go on to a highly successful career for NBC television and radio.

After a slow start in their inaugural season (1974–75), the Spirits reached the playoffs with a late rush, then upset the defending ABA champion New York Nets in the first round of the playoffs. However, after the Spirits lost to the eventual champions, the Kentucky Colonels, they ended up squandering their promising showcase to start out the following year. Despite inheriting several players (including Malone) from the Utah Stars after that franchise folded in the middle of the season, the Spirits finished well out of playoff contention in 1975–76. Attendance in St. Louis fell through the floor; they were lucky to draw crowds of more than 1,000 people in an 18,000-seat arena and frequently drew crowds in the hundreds. At season's end, negotiations were under way to move the franchise to Salt Lake City, Utah as the Utah Rockies (to the point where the team's offices sometimes had calls where they preemptively addressed themselves to callers with the pre-planned early team name idea of the "Spirits of Utah" at first, since people behind the scenes figured the team was going to move to Utah once the final ABA season concluded, assuming they were even going to play the following season at all), though they were also open to moving the franchise to Hartford, Connecticut, as a means to appease the NBA instead.

== NBA merger ==
In the summer of 1976, with the ABA at the point of financial collapse, the six surviving franchises (the Virginia Squires went bankrupt immediately after the final season ended for the ABA) began negotiating a merger with the NBA, but the senior circuit decided to accept only four teams from the rival league: the Nets (the last ABA champion), Denver Nuggets (the runner-up), San Antonio Spurs (the best attended market of the ABA), and Indiana Pacers (the team with the most ABA championships combined with being considered the alternative option to allow in over the Kentucky Colonels).

The NBA placated John Y. Brown, owner of the Kentucky Colonels, by giving him a $3.3 million settlement in exchange for shutting his team down. (Brown later used much of that money to buy the Buffalo Braves of the NBA, which later allowed him to gain ownership of the Boston Celtics briefly.) The owners of the Spirits, the brothers Ozzie and Daniel Silna, struck a prescient deal to acquire future television money from the teams that joined the NBA, a 1/7 share from each surviving ABA franchise (or nearly 2% of the entire NBA's TV money), in perpetuity. (The deal allocated 45% for each of the Silnas and 10% for their lawyer Donald Scupak, who brokered the deal. Ozzie died in 2016.) With network TV deals becoming more and more lucrative, the deal made the Silnas wealthy, earning them $186 million as of 2008, according to the Cleveland Plain Dealer, and $255 million as of 2012 according to The New York Times. (The NBA nearly succeeded in buying out the Silnas in 1982 by offering $5 million over eight years, but negotiations stalled when the siblings demanded $8 million over five.) On June 27, 2007, it was extended for another eight years, ensuring another $100 million+ windfall for the Silnas. In 2014, the Silnas reached an agreement with the NBA to greatly reduce the perpetual payments and take a lump sum of $500 million. In the last few years before the lump sum agreement, the Silnas were receiving $14.57 million a year, despite being owners of a team that hadn't played a game in over 40 years. (The Silnas will, however, still be receiving a now much smaller portion of the television revenue through a new partnership with the former ABA teams, the Nets, Nuggets, Pacers, and Spurs.)

== Documentary ==
On October 8, 2013, ESPN presented a documentary about the team, Free Spirits, as part of its 30 for 30 series. Part of the show contained the fact that the Silnas had been suing the NBA for "hundreds of millions of dollars more" they feel the NBA owes them, presumably for NBA League Pass subscriptions and streaming video (the Silnas dropped the suit when the NBA bought their rights out). As a result – and on the advice of their attorneys – the Silnas refused to be interviewed for the program, directed by Daniel Forer. However, many players, members of management, and Costas – among others – shared their memories of the franchise.

== Basketball Hall of Famers ==
Spirits of St. Louis Hall of Famers
Players
No.	Name	Position	Tenure	Inducted
13	Moses Malone	C	1975–1976	2001
Coaches
Name		Position	Tenure	Inducted
Rod Thorn ^{1}		Head coach	1975	2018

Notes:

- ^{1} Inducted as a contributor.

== Season by season ==
Season	League	Division	Finish	W	L	Win%	Playoffs	Awards
Houston Mavericks
1967–68	ABA	Western	4th	29	49	.372	Lost Division Semifinals (Chaparrals) 0–3	
1968–69	ABA	Western	6th	23	55	.295		
Carolina Cougars
1969–70	ABA	Eastern	3rd	42	42	.500	Lost Division Semifinals (Pacers) 0–4	
1970–71	ABA	Eastern	6th	34	50	.405		
1971–72	ABA	Eastern	5th	35	49	.417		
1972–73	ABA	Eastern	1st	57	27	.679	Won Division Semifinals (Nets) 4–1; Lost Division Finals (Colonels) 3–4	
1973–74	ABA	Eastern	3rd	47	37	.560	Lost Division Semifinals (Colonels) 0–4	
Spirits of St. Louis
1974–75	ABA	Eastern	3rd	32	52	.381	Won Division Semifinals (Nets) 4–1; Lost Division Finals (Colonels) 1–4	Marvin Barnes (ROY); Freddie Lewis (ASG MVP)
1975–76	ABA		6th	35	49	.417		
Regular Season				334	410	.449	1967–1976	
Playoffs				12	18	.400	1967–1976	
