= Mike Barr (basketball) =

American basketball player (born 1950)

Personal information
- Born: October 19, 1950 (age 76) Canton, Ohio, U.S.
- Listed height: 6 ft 3 in (1.91 m)
- Listed weight: 180 lb (82 kg)

Career information
- High school: Lehman (Canton, Ohio)
- College: Duquesne (1969–1972)
- NBA draft: 1972: 13th round, 180th overall pick
- Drafted by: Chicago Bulls
- Playing career: 1972–1978
- Position: Guard
- Number: 34

Career history
- 1972–1974: Virginia Squires
- 1974–1976: Spirits of St. Louis
- 1976–1977: Kansas City Kings
- 1978: West Virginia Wheels

Career ABA and NBA statistics
- Points: 1,804 (5.9 ppg)
- Rebounds: 632 (2.1 rpg)
- Assists: 861 (2.8 apg)
- Stats at NBA.com
- Stats at Basketball Reference

Michael J. Barr (born October 19, 1950) is an American former basketball player.

He played collegiately for the Duquesne Dukes. He was selected by the Chicago Bulls in the 13th round (180th pick overall) of the 1972 NBA draft, and played for the Virginia Squires (1972–74) and Spirits of St. Louis (1974–76) in the ABA and for the Kansas City Kings (1976–77) in the NBA for 307 games.
