= Maurice Lucas =

American basketball player and coach (1952–2010)

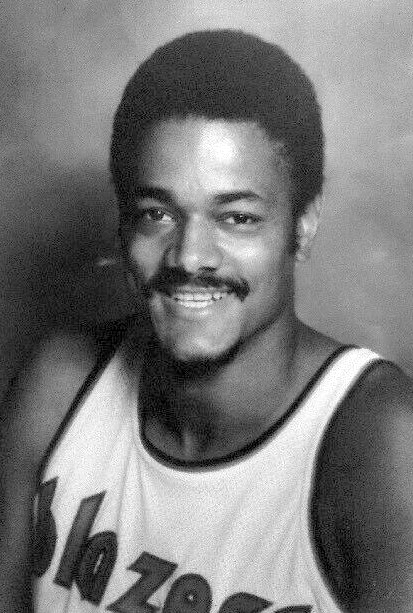

Personal information
- Born: February 18, 1952 Pittsburgh, Pennsylvania, U.S.
- Died: October 31, 2010 (aged 58) Tigard, Oregon, U.S.
- Listed height: 6 ft 9 in (2.06 m)
- Listed weight: 215 lb (98 kg)

Career information
- High school: Schenley (Pittsburgh, Pennsylvania)
- College: Marquette (1972–1974)
- NBA draft: 1974: 1st round, 14th overall pick
- Drafted by: Chicago Bulls
- Playing career: 1974–1988
- Position: Power forward
- Number: 20, 25, 33, 23

Career history
- 1974–1975: Spirits of St. Louis
- 1975–1976: Kentucky Colonels
- 1976–1980: Portland Trail Blazers
- 1980–1981: New Jersey Nets
- 1981–1982: New York Knicks
- 1982–1985: Phoenix Suns
- 1985–1986: Los Angeles Lakers
- 1986–1987: Seattle SuperSonics
- 1987–1988: Portland Trail Blazers

Career highlights
- NBA champion (1977); 4× NBA All-Star (1977–1979, 1983); ABA All-Star (1976); All-NBA Second Team (1978); NBA All-Defensive First Team (1978); NBA All-Defensive Second Team (1979); ABA All-Time Team; No. 20 retired by Portland Trail Blazers; Third-team All-American – NABC (1974); No. 20 retired by Marquette Warriors; Mr. Basketball USA (1971)

Career ABA and NBA statistics
- Points: 14,857 (14.6 ppg)
- Rebounds: 9,306 (9.1 rpg)
- Assists: 2,498 (2.4 apg)
- Stats at NBA.com
- Stats at Basketball Reference

Maurice "Luke" Lucas (February 18, 1952 – October 31, 2010) was an American professional basketball player who played in the American Basketball Association (ABA) and the National Basketball Association (NBA). He was a four-time NBA All-Star and won an NBA championship with the Portland Trail Blazers in 1977. He was named to the ABA All-Time Team.

Lucas played college basketball for the Marquette Warriors. He began his pro career with two years in the ABA with the Spirits of St. Louis and the Kentucky Colonels. He then played 12 seasons in the NBA with the Trail Blazers, New Jersey Nets, New York Knickerbockers, Phoenix Suns, Los Angeles Lakers, and Seattle SuperSonics. The starting power forward on the Trail Blazers' 1976–77 championship team, he was nicknamed "the Enforcer" because of his primary role on the court, which was best exemplified in Game 2 of the NBA Finals that season.

During his career, he organized celebrity sporting events to raise awareness and money for children's care at Legacy Emanuel Medical Center, where his daughter was treated as an infant. Established in 2010, the Maurice Lucas Foundation in Tigard, Oregon, continues his legacy of supporting children's health and youth programs.

== College ==
Lucas played college basketball for head coach Al McGuire with the then-Marquette Warriors for two years, leading them to the NCAA championship game in 1974. In the national semifinal game, Lucas led Marquette to a 64–51 victory over Kansas with game leading totals of 18 points, 14 rebounds, and 4 blocks. Marquette lost the title game to North Carolina State 76–64, while Lucas played the full 40 minutes of the game, leading his team with both 21 points and 13 rebounds.

== ABA ==
In 1973, the Carolina Cougars of the American Basketball Association (ABA) obtained the rights to Lucas in the first round of the ABA draft. In 1974, Lucas was also selected by the Chicago Bulls of the National Basketball Association (NBA) with the 14th overall pick of the NBA draft. Lucas chose the ABA over the NBA, joining the Spirits of St. Louis team, which had since supplanted the Carolina Cougars in the ABA.

Lucas started his career off the bench but soon developed into a tough power forward. This became apparent early in his rookie season when, during a game trading elbows with Artis Gilmore (who outsized him at 7'2 and 240 pounds), the two got into a skirmish where Gilmore wanted to punch Lucas. He missed, and Lucas, who had backed up into the corner of the court, planted his feet and punched Gilmore right on the jaw that saw him go down.

During his first season, Lucas averaged 13.2 points per game, and 10 rebounds per game, and was chosen for the 1974–75 ABA All-Rookie second team. In the 1975 ABA Playoffs, Lucas averaged 16.3 points, 14.7 rebounds, and 5 assists per game, as the Spirits advanced past the New York Nets in the first round with a 4–1 series victory before losing to the eventual champion Kentucky Colonels in the Eastern Division Finals.

On December 17, 1975, partway through his second season with the Spirits, Lucas was traded to the Kentucky Colonels in exchange for Caldwell Jones. Lucas was an ABA All-Star for the 1975–76 season, and averaged 17.0 points and 11.3 rebounds per game. Lucas remained with the Colonels through their loss in the semifinals of the 1976 ABA Playoffs to the Denver Nuggets and through the ABA–NBA merger in 1976.

== NBA ==
Walton has found some real soul partners, too. Lucas, the fearsome ABA enforcer, is another vegetarian, in addition to being one of the most complete power forwards in the league; at times Walton appears stunned when, high over the backboard, he glances across the rim to witness Lucas ripping another rebound asunder and scattering the bodies below him. "Bill's a gorilla until the fight starts. Then he goes in hiding while I straighten things out," Lucas says.

— C. Kirkpatrick, "Healthy, Wealthy and Size", SI (Dec. 13, 1976)

After the ABA–NBA merger, Lucas was selected by the Portland Trail Blazers in the subsequent ABA Dispersal Draft in which the Kentucky Colonels and Spirits of St. Louis players were selected by NBA teams. Portland had traded Geoff Petrie and Steve Hawes to the Atlanta Hawks for the second overall pick, which they used to select Lucas. In the 1976–77 NBA season, Lucas led the Trail Blazers in scoring, minutes played, field goals, free throws, and offensive rebounds. Not only did the team qualify for their first trip to the playoffs that season, but Lucas and teammate Bill Walton led the Trail Blazers past the favored Los Angeles Lakers, sweeping them 4–0 in the Western Conference Finals, and a surprising come-from-behind 4–2 upset victory over the Philadelphia 76ers in the 1977 NBA Finals.

In that NBA Finals series, Lucas asserted his "enforcer" role in Game 2. With the 76ers comfortably ahead late in the game, the Blazers streaked down the floor on a fast break. Lionel Hollins missed the shot, both Bob Gross and Darryl Dawkins went up and wrestled for the rebound, and both came crashing to the floor. As Dawkins ran up court, he threw a punch that largely missed Gross, nailing his own teammate Doug Collins instead. As Dawkins reached mid-court, Lucas greeted him with an elbow to the head, after which they briefly squared off. Both benches emptied, and Dawkins and Lucas were ejected. Although the 76ers would go on to win the game and go up 2–0 in the series, Lucas' actions appeared to alter the momentum of the series in favor of the Blazers. Inspired, Portland won the next two games at home in blowouts, then won at Philadelphia, and closed out the 76ers at home to win the series. Sports Illustrated featured Lucas on their cover for their 1977–78 NBA preview issue, spotlighting enforcers throughout the league. He remained with Portland until 1980 when he was traded to the New Jersey Nets in exchange for Calvin Natt. On February 13, 1981, Lucas set a career high with 6 blocks, while also scoring 31 points and grabbing 13 rebounds, during a 103–100 New Jersey win over the Indiana Pacers.

After a year with the Nets, Lucas was traded to the New York Knicks for Ray Williams. In 1982, he was dealt to the Phoenix Suns for Truck Robinson. In Phoenix, Lucas helped an injury-plagued Suns team reach the Western Conference Finals in 1984. Ironically, Lucas would sign with the team Phoenix lost to in 1984, the Los Angeles Lakers, following the 1985 season. On December 4, 1985, Lucas made a 60-foot shot at the regulation buzzer to send the game into overtime. The Lakers would go on to defeat the Utah Jazz 131–127. After the Lakers lost the 1986 Western Conference Finals to the Houston Rockets, Lucas moved to the Seattle SuperSonics for one year, before returning to the Trail Blazers for his final NBA season in 1988.

In his fourteen-year professional basketball career – two in the ABA and 12 in the NBA – Lucas scored 14,857 points and gathered 9,306 rebounds in 1021 games. He was a five-time All-Star – one in the ABA and four in the NBA. He was named to the 1978 All-NBA-Defense First team, the 1978 All-NBA Second team, and the 1979 All-NBA-Defense Second team.

== Post-playing career ==
Lucas was hired by the Portland Trail Blazers as an assistant coach under Mike Schuler and Rick Adelman during the 1988–89 season. In 2005, Lucas rejoined the Trail Blazers as an assistant coach under Nate McMillan.

== Maurice Lucas Foundation ==
Established in 2010, the Maurice Lucas Foundation supports children's health and youth programs. The foundation creates a range of opportunities for middle school, high school and post-high school students by offering school programs, learning experiences, and sporting activities.

== Personal life ==
Lucas had three children: Maurice Lucas II, David Lucas, and Kristin Lucas. His son David played basketball for Oregon State University from 2001 to 2005, and professionally in China, Poland, and Portugal.

Lucas was a Catholic chaplain at the MacLaren Youth Correctional Facility. After his death, David Lucas created the Maurice Lucas Foundation, and is its executive director.

== Illness and death ==
In April 2009, Lucas underwent surgery for bladder cancer. With his health continuing to be a concern, Lucas resigned his coaching position following the 2009–2010 season.

Lucas died at his home in Portland, Oregon, on October 31, 2010. Services were also held in his childhood home town, Pittsburgh. The Blazers honored him by wearing No. 20 patches on their jerseys for the 2010–2011 season.

== Legacy ==
On November 4, 1988, the Portland Trail Blazers retired his jersey number, 20.

On August 23, 1997, at the ABA's 30 Year Reunion celebration, Lucas was named to the All-Time All-ABA Team along with Hall of Fame members Julius Erving, Dan Issel, George Gervin, Rick Barry, Connie Hawkins and other ABA greats.

Former NBA player and current Detroit Pistons assistant coach Luke Walton, son of Lucas' Portland teammate and Hall of Famer Bill Walton, is named after him.
