= Marvin Barnes =

American basketball player (1952–2014)

Personal information
- Born: July 27, 1952 Providence, Rhode Island, U.S.
- Died: September 8, 2014 (aged 62) Providence, Rhode Island, U.S.
- Listed height: 6 ft 9 in (2.06 m)
- Listed weight: 210 lb (95 kg)

Career information
- High school: Central (Providence, Rhode Island)
- College: Providence (1971–1974)
- NBA draft: 1974: 1st round, 2nd overall pick
- Drafted by: Philadelphia 76ers
- Playing career: 1974–1986
- Position: Power forward / center
- Number: 24, 8, 27

Career history
- 1974–1976: Spirits of St. Louis
- 1976–1977: Detroit Pistons
- 1977–1978: Buffalo Braves
- 1978–1979: Boston Celtics
- 1979–1980: San Diego Clippers
- 1980: Hurlingham Trieste
- 1982–1983: Detroit Spirits
- 1983–1984: Ohio Mixers
- 1985–1986: Evansville Thunder

Career highlights
- 2× ABA All-Star (1975, 1976); All-ABA Second Team (1975); ABA Rookie of the Year (1975); ABA All-Rookie First Team (1975); ABA All-Time Team; Consensus first-team All-American (1974); Third-team All-American – UPI (1973); NCAA rebounding leader (1974)

Career ABA and NBA statistics
- Points: 5,034 (16.0 ppg)
- Rebounds: 2,873 (9.1 rpg)
- Assists: 651 (2.1 apg)
- Stats at NBA.com
- Stats at Basketball Reference

Marvin Jerome "Bad News" Barnes (July 27, 1952 – September 8, 2014) was an American professional basketball player. A power forward, he was an All-American at Providence College, and played professionally in both the American Basketball Association (ABA) and National Basketball Association (NBA).

== College career ==
In 1973, Barnes was the first player to score 10 times on 10 field goal attempts in an NCAA tournament game, a record surpassed by Kenny Walker, who went 11-for-11 in 1986. He led the nation in rebounding in 1973–74. On December 15, 1973, Barnes scored 52 points against Austin Peay, breaking the single-game school record.

At Providence, Barnes averaged 20.7 points, 17.9 rebounds and 2.7 assists in 89 career games under coach Dave Gavitt.

== Professional career ==
Barnes was drafted by both the Denver Rockets (now known as the Denver Nuggets) as the sixth pick of the first round (or 106th pick of the eleventh round) of the 1973 ABA Draft's undergraduate draft period as a junior and by the Philadelphia 76ers as the second pick in the first round of the 1974 NBA draft as a senior. However, despite being officially undrafted during the 1974 ABA draft, Barnes would sign a deal with the Spirits of St. Louis (formerly known as the Carolina Cougars) to play for the American Basketball Association with them from 1974 until the ABA merged with the NBA in 1976, which he would then play for from 1976 until 1980. Barnes signing with the Spirits would later give Denver a bonus draft pick to start out the 1975 ABA draft, which the Nuggets used to select Marvin Webster. He had his greatest success while out in the ABA, where he was a star player for the Spirits and was named Rookie of the Year for the 1974–75 season. Barnes also shares the ABA record for the most two-point field goals in a game, with 27 total made. In 2005, the ABA 2000, the second incarnation of the ABA, named one of their divisions after him.

Often a colorful personality, Barnes once refused to board a plane from Louisville to St. Louis. Because the flight was scheduled to arrive (Central Time) before its departure time (Eastern Time), Barnes famously said, "I ain't getting in no damn time machine." He rented a car instead.

In 144 ABA games over two seasons, Barnes averaged 21.4 points, 13.4 rebounds, 2.8 assists, 1.5 steals and 1.9 blocks. In 171 career NBA games Barnes averaged 9.2 points, 5.5 rebounds and 1.5 assists. His overall ABA/NBA career averages were 16.0 points, 9.1 rebounds and 2.1 assists.

Barnes was taken by the Detroit Pistons in the 1976 ABA Dispersal Draft. In the 1976–77 Detroit Pistons season with Barnes, Pistons Powered described the season as "absolutely insane, probably the craziest in Pistons history. They won a lot of games, but were completely dysfunctional." Barnes was arrested for a probation violation for carrying a gun at the Detroit Metropolitan Airport, and the Pistons would eventually bench "Bad News" Barnes, who said "News didn’t come here to sit on no wood." In later years, star Detroit center Bob Lanier reflected on the dysfunctional Barnes, stating "In the ABA, Marvin Barnes was a great, great player that had issues. They took a chance on him, but Marvin was still into street life and he affected Eric Money. Money (a Detroit product, who played college ball at Arizona) could shoot the in-between jumper and he might’ve been one of the best that ever played. A few years ago I ran into Marvin in Houston and he said, ‘Bob, I used to get get high all the time and Eric started to get high with me.’ When somebody tells you that and this is 20-some odd years later, you want put your fist right through their head. And I adored Marvin Barnes – I liked his personality and he's as charming a guy as you'd ever want to meet. But in terms of him trying to be part of the team that wins a championship ... man..."

Detroit traded Barnes to the Buffalo Braves at the start of the 1978–79 NBA season. Barnes then played for the Boston Celtics for one season, and with Boston, Barnes later admitted to cocaine use on the bench, "Yeah, I was doing it on the bench. I was playing for the Celtics, and I was sitting next to Nate Archibald and somebody else, and I was snorting cocaine right there on the bench while the game was going on. They all moved away from me. I had it under a towel. I guess I don’t need to say that my career didn’t last much longer after that."

Barnes would then finish his NBA career with the San Diego Clippers in 1980 before briefly playing in the Italian Basketball League for Pallacanestro Trieste in the Lega Basket Serie A in Italy in 1980–81.

== Nickname ==
Barnes's nickname "Bad News" was derived from his frequent off-court problems, which began when he was a senior at Central High School. He was part of a gang that attempted to rob a bus. Barnes was quickly identified, as he was wearing his state championship jacket with his name embroidered on it. His case was handled by the juvenile justice system. In 1972, while playing center for Providence College, Barnes attacked a teammate with a tire iron. He later pleaded guilty to assault, paid the victim $10,000 and was placed on probation. Barnes violated probation on October 9, 1976, when an unloaded .38 caliber pistol and five loose bullets were found in his bag at the Detroit Metro Airport as he was preparing to board a flight to St. Louis. On May 16, 1977, he was sent to the Adult Correctional Institute in Cranston, Rhode Island, where he served 152 days. Upon release he returned to the Detroit Pistons. Barnes was later arrested for burglary, drug possession, and trespassing. Because of his drug use, Barnes's NBA career was cut short and he wound up homeless in San Diego in the early 1980s. After several rehab programs, Barnes started reaching out to youth in South Providence, where he grew up, urging them not to make the same mistakes he had.

== Death ==
On September 8, 2014, Barnes died at the age of 62. The death was confirmed by Kevin Stacom, a scout for the Dallas Mavericks, who was a teammate on the Providence College team that reached the Final Four in 1973. Barnes, who had been drug-free for several years, had recently succumbed to his addiction again, Stacom said.

== Legacy ==
In March 2008, Providence College retired his jersey, honoring him along with Ernie DiGregorio and Jimmy Walker. He still co-holds (since tied by MarShon Brooks) the school single-game scoring record of 52 points. Barnes is also a member of the Providence Athletics Hall of Fame, enshrined in 1992.

== See also ==
- List of NCAA Division I men's basketball players with 30 or more rebounds in a game
- List of NCAA Division I men's basketball season rebounding leaders
- List of NCAA Division I men's basketball career rebounding leaders
