= Don DeJardin =

American basketball executive and basketball player

Donald Arthur DeJardin (January 29, 1936 – August 16, 2011) was an American basketball executive and sports agent who was the general manager of the Carolina Cougars of the American Basketball Association and the Philadelphia 76ers of the National Basketball Association.

== Early life ==
DeJardin was born on January 29, 1936, in New York City. He was a member of the Army Cadets men's basketball team from 1955 to 1958 and averaged 8.2 points and 5.8 rebounds per game. He was team captain during the 1957–58 season. He graduated from the United States Military Academy in 1958.

After serving in the United States Army, DeJardin pursued a career in the corporate world. From 1961, he became a purchasing manager for the Westinghouse Electric Corporation in Pittsburgh. In 1964, he earned his Master of Business Administration from Duquesne University. He became a management consultant for Boeing in Cocoa Beach, Florida in 1965, but returned to Westinghouse after a year, this time working out of their Philadelphia office.

== Carolina Cougars ==
DeJardin served as a part-time director of player personnel for the Pittsburgh Pipers of the American Basketball Association during the 1967–68 season. His experience there got him interested in running a team. When looking around for interested investors, he met then-Congressmen Jim Gardner and the pair found investors to form Southern Sports Corporation, which purchased the Houston Mavericks and relocated them to North Carolina, where they became the Carolina Cougars. The Cougars split their home games between three cities (Greensboro, Charlotte, and Raleigh) and averaged around 6,000 fans during their inaugural season. They finished third in the Eastern Division with a 42–42 record. DeJardin had an option to acquire partial ownership of the team if certain goals were met. DeJardin felt these objectives were unrealistic and asked that they be waived, which Southern Sports Corporation refused to do. As a result, DeJardin resigned on June 8, 1970.

== Philadelphia 76ers ==
In August 1970, DeJardin signed a three-year contract to become general manager of the National Basketball Association's Philadelphia 76ers. He succeeded Jack Ramsay, who continued to serve as head coach. The 76ers went 47–35 in DeJardin's first season, but were defeated in the Eastern Conference semifinals by the Baltimore Bullets.

Philadelphia went 30–52 the following season and Ramsay resigned as head coach. DeJardin selected LIU basketball coach Roy Rubin to succeed him. That same offseason, the 76ers lost their star player, Billy Cunningham, to the Carolina Cougars after the United States Court of Appeals for the Fourth Circuit ruled he was obligated to honor a contract he had signed with the team while DeJardin was their general manager. Rubin was fired after a 4–47 start to the 1972–73 season and replaced by Kevin Loughery. The 76ers finished the season with a NBA record 73 losses.

After winning a coin toss, they received the first overall pick in the 1973 NBA draft, which was projected to be UCLA center Bill Walton. DeJardin offered Walton a $2 million contract, but he decided to return to UCLA for his senior season. The 76ers attempted to trade the pick to the Chicago Bulls for Clifford Ray and Bob Weiss, but the deal fell apart after Ray failed a physical. The Sixers also had the fourth overall pick of the Seattle SuperSonics after NBA Commissioner J. Walter Kennedy awarded it to Philadelphia as compensation for John Brisker, who signed with the Sonics despite being on Philadelphia's negotiation list. However, the federal court invalidated Kennedy's decision, ruling that only the NBA Board of Governors had the power to do so. Subsequently, the board awarded the 76ers an extra first-round draft pick and the Sonics' second-round pick, while allowing Seattle to keep the fourth pick. The day before the draft, head coach Kevin Loughery informed the organization he would be leaving to take the same job with the ABA's New York Nets. Philadelphia selected Doug Collins with the first overall pick, Raymond Lewis with the extra first-round pick, and Allan Bristow, George McGinnis, and Caldwell Jones in the second round. Lewis left the team before playing a single game due to a contract dispute and Jones signed with the ABA's San Diego Conquistadors. On September 18, 1973, DeJardin was fired by owner Irv Kosloff following an exhibition loss to the Nets.

== Sports agent ==
After his dismissal, DeJardin became a sports agent. He negotiated Gary Payton's rookie contract with the Seattle SuperSonics. He also helped players sign with clubs outside of the United States, which included negotiating Andrew Kennedy's contract with Hapoel Galil Elyon and Antonio Davis' deal with Panathinaikos B.C., and Mark Landsberger's aborted signing with Fulgor Libertas Forlì. In 1991, he Kevin Lynch instructed Charlotte Hornets rookie Kevin Lynch to holdout after he was offered a three-year, $1.2 million contract. Lynch ended up signing for the league minimum $130,000, which was pro-rated to $90,000 due to the holdout. Outside of basketball, DeJardin represented Major League Baseball pitcher Matt Young. His other clients included Al Eberhard, Allan Bristow, Kim Anderson, Raymond Lewis, Chris Ford, Terry Cummings, Don Ford, Wayne Robinson, James Donaldson, Greg Ballard, Steve Mitchell, Randy Breuer, Jim Petersen, Richard Coffey, and Scott Haskin. He retired in 2009 and died on August 16, 2011.
