= Jim O'Brien (basketball, born 1951) =

American basketball player (born 1951)

Personal information
- Born: November 7, 1951 (age 75) Falls Church, Virginia, U.S.
- Listed height: 6 ft 7 in (2.01 m)
- Listed weight: 200 lb (91 kg)

Career information
- High school: J. E. B. Stuart (Falls Church, Virginia)
- College: Maryland (1970–1973)
- NBA draft: 1973: 3rd round, 37th overall pick
- Drafted by: Cleveland Cavaliers
- Playing career: 1973–1975
- Position: Small forward
- Number: 44, 15

Career history
- 1974: New York Nets
- 1974–1975: Memphis Sounds

Career highlights
- ABA champion (1974); Second-team All-ACC (1971)
- Stats at Basketball Reference

James M. O'Brien (born November 7, 1951) is an American former professional basketball player. O'Brien played college basketball for the Maryland Terrapins, leaving as the program's sixth all-time leading scorer. O'Brien was selected in both the 1973 ABA draft and 1973 NBA draft. The Indiana Pacers, then of the ABA, selected him in the third round, while the Cleveland Cavaliers chose him in NBA's third draft round as well.

The New York Nets acquired O'Brien's ABA rights from Indiana in June 1973 and signed him to a one-year guaranteed contract for $100,000. He was cut by the Nets in training camp as Nets' coach Kevin Loughery felt he was too heavy and too slow. He played semi-pro ball for Trenton in the Eastern League for a few months while getting paid by and practicing with the Nets. He was brought back to the Nets in January 1974 while a few Nets' players were injured and Loughery stated at the time that O'Brien was in much better condition than he was during training camp. He won the ABA championship in 1973–74 with the Nets. During the 1974 playoffs he only played in 4 games for a total of less than 10 minutes. In the finals he only played in 1 game for 3 minutes but scored 8 points in that short time.

The Nets cut O'Brien during 1974 training camp and he was signed by the Memphis Sounds. O'Brien said of being cut by the Nets that:

I had the feeling I was going to be cut in camp. I thought it was between Al Skinner and me but when Ed Manning arrived and got the playing time I knew I was gone. I didn't panic though. I thought there was a place for me and I am very happy here in Memphis. I'm getting the playing time and I don't care if it's at guard or forward.

The Sounds folded after the 1974–75 season and O'Brien signed with the Cavaliers of the NBA, despite having an option year left on his ABA contract. O'Brien was waived by the Cavaliers before the 1975–76 season started.
