= George Reynolds (basketball) =

American basketball player

Personal information
- Born: November 23, 1947 (age 78)
- Listed height: 6 ft 4 in (1.93 m)
- Listed weight: 195 lb (88 kg)

Career information
- College: Imperial Valley (1965–1967); Houston (1967–1969)
- NBA draft: 1969: 9th round, 117th overall pick
- Drafted by: Detroit Pistons
- Playing career: 1969–1975
- Position: Point guard
- Number: 10

Career history
- 1969: Detroit Pistons
- 1970–1971: Binghamton Flyers / Trenton Pat Pavers
- 1975: Swiss Alpines
- Stats at NBA.com
- Stats at Basketball Reference

George Reynolds (born November 23, 1947) is an American former professional basketball player who played collegiately for the Houston Cougars before a brief stint in the National Basketball Association (NBA) with the Detroit Pistons.

== College career ==
Reynolds transferred from Imperial Valley College, a junior college, to Houston in 1967.

He was part of the 1967–68 Cougars team which downed UCLA (then undefeated for 47 games) in the Game of the Century on 20 January 1968. He scored a team second-best 13 points in the 71–69 upset, also contributing good defending. He was the starting guard for Houston, the No. 1 collegiate team that season, and led the team in assists during the regular season with 157, also scoring 280 points. However, he was ruled ineligible for postseason play in March 1968, a few days before the NCAA tournament, because of insufficient semester hours at Imperial Valley. Houston would lose 69–101 to UCLA in the tournament semi-finals, with teammate Don Chaney crediting Reynolds' absence as decisive. He again led Houston in assists during the 1968–69 season, also contributing 13 points per game in his senior year.

== Professional career ==
He was drafted in the ninth round (117th pick overall) of the 1969 NBA draft by the Detroit Pistons, he signed with the team in June of that year. He played only 10 games for the Pistons (averaging 2.1 points and 1.2 assists) during the 1969–70 NBA season before being waived in mid-December

Reynolds played eight games for the Binghamton Flyers / Trenton Pat Pavers in the Eastern Basketball Association (EBA) during the 1970–71 season.

He played for the Swiss Alpines of the European Professional Basketball League during the league's only season in early 1975.

== Career statistics ==
Legend
GP	Games played	GS	Games started	MPG	Minutes per game
FG%	Field goal percentage	3P%	3-point field goal percentage	FT%	Free throw percentage
RPG	Rebounds per game	APG	Assists per game	SPG	Steals per game
BPG	Blocks per game	PPG	Points per game	**Bold**	Career high

=== NBA ===
==== Regular season ====
Year	Team	GP	MPG	FG%	FT%	RPG	APG	PPG
1969–70	Detroit	10	4.4	.421	.714	1.4	1.2	2.1
