= 1974–75 New York Nets season =

ABA professional basketball team season

- Head coach: Kevin Loughery
- Arena: Nassau Veterans Memorial Coliseum

Results
- Record: 58–26 (.690)
- Place: Division: 2nd (Eastern (ABA))
- Playoff finish: Division semifinals (lost to Spirits 1–4)
- Stats at Basketball Reference

Local media
- Television: WOR 9
- Radio: WMCA

The 1974–75 New York Nets season was the eighth season of the franchise in the American Basketball Association, which saw them first begin play as the New Jersey Americans before they moved to New York as the Nets for the rest of their ABA tenure. Entering this season, the Nets started out as the defending champions of the ABA for the first time in franchise history. One of the most notable games they played this season was against the San Diego Conquistadors in a quadruple-overtime game on February 14, losing what would become the highest-scoring game in ABA history with a 176–166 final score (the 166 points the Nets scored is still the highest overall points scored in franchise history either in the ABA or NBA to date (their highest-scoring NBA game as of 2025 would also come in a loss on December 7, 2006 in a 161–157 double-overtime loss to the Phoenix Suns when they became the New Jersey Nets at the time), which also led to their game against the Conquistadors being the highest-scoring professional basketball game overall (either in the ABA or NBA) until the Detroit Pistons (who previously won the lowest-scoring NBA game back when they were the Fort Wayne Pistons) beat the Denver Nuggets in a 186–184 triple-overtime game as a part of the NBA on December 13, 1983). Despite the Nets leading the Eastern Division with a five-game lead with close to two weeks remaining in the regular season, they would end up having a tied record to the Kentucky Colonels there due to Kentucky winning 22 out of their last 25 games of their season, including the final 10 games of their regular season (which also involved the final regular season game the Nets played). The Nets would play the Colonels in a one-game playoff match to determine the official Eastern Division winner, but Artis Gilmore's rebounding presence (with Gilmore having more rebounds than the entire Nets team that game) proved to be too much for the Nets during that match. Going from bad to worse, the Nets would lose their first round series match-up to the Spirits of St. Louis, a team they had beaten in the regular season eleven different times beforehand and also had a losing record to qualify for the playoffs, 4-1, thus failing at a chance for a rematch against the Colonels in the 1975 ABA Playoffs properly. This season also tragically proved to be their last season with beloved small forward Wendell Ladner playing for them, as after this season ended, he would tragically lose his life as one of the 113 fatalities (out of 124 total people) found in the Eastern Air Lines Flight 66, with him being identified by his championship ring with the Nets from the previous season as well as being the only ABA player to die during their career while in the league.

== ABA Draft ==
Round	Pick	Player	Position(s)	Nationality	College
1	9	Brian Winters	PG/SG	United States	South Carolina
2	17	Rich Kelley	PF/C	United States	Stanford
3	30	Tom Boswell	PF/C	United States	South Carolina
4	40	Talvin Skinner	SF	United States	Maryland Eastern Shore
5	50	Eric Fernsten	PF/C	United States	San Francisco
6	60	Gary Brokaw	SG	United States	Notre Dame
7	70	Dean Tolson	PF	United States	Arkansas
8	80	Al Skinner	SG	United States	Massachusetts
9	90	Bob Fleischer	F	United States	Duke

This draft table does not include players selected in the "ABA Draft of NBA Players" that was done immediately afterward.

=== ABA Draft of NBA Players ===
Round	Pick	Player	Position(s)	Nationality	College	NBA Team
1	10	Phil Chenier	SG	United States	California	Capital Bullets
2	20	Dave Cowens	C	United States	Florida State	Boston Celtics
3	30	Jerry Sloan	SG	United States	Evansville	Chicago Bulls
4	40	Jim Fox	PF/C	United States	South Carolina	Seattle SuperSonics
5	50	Garfield Heard	PF	United States	Oklahoma	Buffalo Braves

The "ABA Draft of NBA Players" that was done on April 17, 1974 happened immediately after the actual ABA Draft done for this season was concluded on that day. None of the five players drafted by the Nets would report to the team during this season, though Jim Fox would later play for the Nets following the ABA-NBA merger that would later occur in 1976 for what would become his final season of play. Of the players selected by the Nets, Dave Cowens and Jerry Sloan would later go into the Naismith Basketball Hall of Fame, though Sloan would primarily make it there for his role as a head coach for the Utah Jazz in the NBA.

== Roster ==
1974–75 New York Nets roster
Players

Pos.	No.	Player	Height	Weight	DOB	From
SF	32	Julius Erving	6 ft 7 in (2.01 m)	210 lb (95 kg)	1950-02-22	UMass
PG	12	Mike Gale	6 ft 4 in (1.93 m)	185 lb (84 kg)	1950-07-18	Elizabeth City State
PF	35	Larry Kenon	6 ft 9 in (2.06 m)	205 lb (93 kg)	1952-12-13	Memphis
SF	4	Wendell Ladner	6 ft 5 in (1.96 m)	220 lb (100 kg)	1948-10-06	Southern Miss
SF	22	Ed Manning	6 ft 7 in (2.01 m)	210 lb (95 kg)	1944-01-02	Jackson State
PG	25	Bill Melchionni	6 ft 1 in (1.85 m)	165 lb (75 kg)	1944-10-19	Villanova
C	5	Billy Paultz	6 ft 11 in (2.11 m)	235 lb (107 kg)	1948-07-30	St. John's
SF	15	Billy Schaeffer	6 ft 5 in (1.96 m)	200 lb (91 kg)	1951-12-11	St. John's
SG	30	Al Skinner	6 ft 3 in (1.91 m)	190 lb (86 kg)	1952-06-16	UMass
C	40	Willie Sojourner	6 ft 8 in (2.03 m)	225 lb (102 kg)	1948-09-10	Weber State
PG	14	Brian Taylor	6 ft 2 in (1.88 m)	185 lb (84 kg)	1951-06-09	Princeton
SG	23	John Williamson	6 ft 2 in (1.88 m)	185 lb (84 kg)	1951-11-10	New Mexico State

Coaches
Head coach
- Kevin Loughery

Legend
- (DP) Unsigned draft pick
- (FA) Free agent
- (S) Suspended
- Injured

Roster

== Final standings ==
=== Eastern Division ===
Team	W	L	PCT.	GB
Kentucky Colonels* C	58	26	.690	-
New York Nets*	58	26	.690	-
Spirits of St. Louis*	32	52	.381	26
Memphis Sounds*	27	57	.321	31
Virginia Squires	15	69	.179	43

Asterisk denotes playoff berth

== ABA Playoffs ==
Two days before the Semifinals began, the Nets and Colonels had a Tiebreaker game played to settle who would be the Eastern Division Champion and play the Memphis Sounds. Julius Erving scored 34 points for the Nets, but Artis Gilmore grabbed 33 rebounds for Kentucky, which was more rebounds than the entire Nets team got that game. The Colonels won the game 108–99 in Kentucky, thus the Nets were slated to play the Spirits of St. Louis.

ABA Eastern Division Semifinals vs. Spirits of St. Louis

Game	Date	Location	Score	Record	Attendance
1	April 6	New York	111–105	1–0	11,607
2	April 9	New York	97–115	1–1	10,621
3	April 11	St. Louis	108–113	1–2	6,199
4	April 13	St. Louis	89–100	1–3	7,719
5	April 15	New York	107–108	1–4	9,664

Nets lose series, 4–1
