= Hank Siemiontkowski =

American basketball player

Personal information
- Born: 1950 (age 75–76) Philadelphia, Pennsylvania, U.S.
- Listed height: 6 ft 7 in (2.01 m)
- Listed weight: 230 lb (104 kg)

Career information
- High school: Northeast Catholic (Philadelphia, Pennsylvania)
- College: Villanova (1969–1972)
- NBA draft: 1972: 4th round, 50th overall pick
- Drafted by: Cleveland Cavaliers
- Playing career: 1972–1996
- Positions: Small forward, Power forward
- Number: 21, 52, 44, 45, 33, 40, 30

Career history
- 1972-1975: Scranton Apollos
- 1975: Belgium Lions
- 1978-1979: Wilkes-Barre Lions
- Stats at Basketball Reference

Hank Siemiontkowski (born 1950) is an American former basketball player. A forward, he played for the Villanova Wildcats.

== High school career ==
Born and raised in the Port Richmond, Philadelphia, Siemiontkowski played for Northeast Catholic High School. He was a big part of the 1967 team which won the Philadelphia Catholic League over Bonner and City Championship over Overbrook, this was last city title for the school. He was voted the Catholic League Northern Division MVP in both 1967 & 1968. In 1968 he was part of the varsity squad suspended by coach Jack Friel for returning late to school after breakfast. The story made national headlines as the North junior varsity team then defeated Bishop McDevitt in the quarter finals of the Catholic League playoffs. Siemiontkowski graduated in 1968 with the highest single season scoring average in North Catholic school history at 22.6 PPG (later equalled by Joe Schoen in 1977).

== College career ==
Siemiontkowski played collegiately with Villanova from 1969 to 1972. As a junior, he scored a career-high 31 points (also grabbing 15 rebounds) in an overtime win against Western Kentucky in the semifinals of the 1971 NCAA tournament. He scored 19 points in the Wildcats final loss to UCLA. He was named to the 1971 NCAA East Regional all-tournament team along with his teammate Howard Porter (Porter caused Villanova's season to be vacated from records as he had signed with an agent). He finished his career at Villanova with a 13.6 PPG average and is 12th all-time for the Wildcats in rebounding with 739 boards.

== Professional career ==
He was chosen in the fourth round (50th pick) of the 1972 NBA draft by the Cleveland Cavaliers, and by the New York Nets in the American Basketball Association draft in April 1972. He signed with the Cavaliers but was placed on waivers in October that year. He played for the Belgium Lions of the European Professional Basketball League in the first half of 1975.

He played professionally until he was 46 in Finland, New Zealand and Sweden then settled in the small Swedish town of Fritsla.
