= John Vallely =

American former professional basketball player

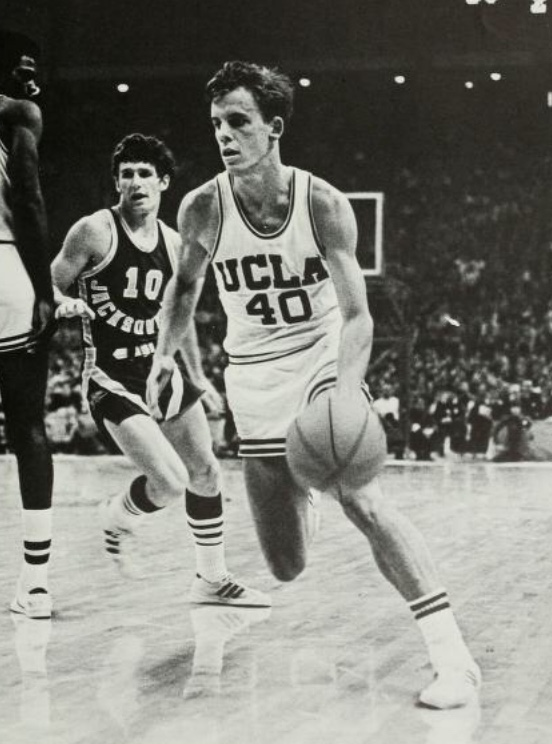
- Vallely from the 1970 UCLA yearbook

Personal information
- Born: October 3, 1948 (age 78) Newport Beach, California, U.S.
- Listed height: 6 ft 3 in (1.91 m)
- Listed weight: 185 lb (84 kg)

Career information
- High school: Corona del Mar (Newport Beach, California)
- College: Orange Coast (1966–1968); UCLA (1968–1970)
- NBA draft: 1970: 1st round, 14th overall pick
- Drafted by: Atlanta Hawks
- Playing career: 1970–1975
- Position: Shooting guard
- Number: 40, 33

Career history
- 1970–1971: Atlanta Hawks
- 1971–1972: Houston Rockets
- 1975: Belgium Lions

Career highlights
- 2× NCAA champion (1969, 1970); Third-team All-American – AP, NABC, UPI (1970); Second-team All-Pac-8 (1970)
- Stats at NBA.com
- Stats at Basketball Reference

John Vallely (born October 3, 1948) is an American former professional basketball player from Balboa Island, Newport Beach, California who played for UCLA and in the National Basketball Association (NBA).

== Early life ==
Vallely attended Corona del Mar High School, where he was a guard turned forward. He was selected to the all California Interscholastic Federation team and twice captured All Irvine League honors.

== College career ==
As a 6'2" forward for Orange Coast College, Vallely averaged 26 points per game and broke 18 scoring records. He was selected a junior college All-American. He dribbled with his left hand and shot with his right hand. He was especially good at shooting an outside jump shot.

After transferring to UCLA in 1968, he became an integral member of the Bruins' backcourt in 1968. Vallely was quick to make the transition from forward to guard at UCLA. In his first season, he was the Bruins' third leading scorer (12.9 ppg) and adapted smoothly to head coach John Wooden's "attack and gamble offense". He was a member of the UCLA teams that won national titles in the 1969 NCAA tournament and the 1970 NCAA tournament. Vallely majored in economics at UCLA and had a 3.36 grade point average as a junior.

He was selected to the twelve man 1968 Olympic trials team coached by Jerry Tarkanian which competed in Albuquerque, New Mexico.

== Professional career ==
Vallely was selected by the Atlanta Hawks in the first round of the 1970 NBA draft. He sat on the bench much of the time, playing behind Pete Maravich, Lou Hudson, Walt Hazzard, and Herm Gilliam. Vallely was acquired by the Houston Rockets in November 1971 along with 6'7" forward Jim Davis.

He served as player-coach for the Belgium Lions of the European Professional Basketball League in 1975.

== Personal ==
Vallely married Karen, a woman he met at Orange Coast College, where he studied prior to attending UCLA. They wed around the time he was selected in the NBA. The couple had two children, Eric and Erin. Erin died of a rare form of cancer of the soft muscle tissue in September 1991. Eric starred as a volleyball player while he was a student at UCLA.

=== Illness ===
Vallely was diagnosed with non-Hodgkin's lymphoma in 2003. He had a single stem cell treatment which was unsuccessful. He received a second offer from a stem cell donor bank, which received a nearly exact match from a winemaker who lived near Frankfurt, Germany. This time the treatment was a success. Vallely was able to meet his donor following a two-year waiting period.

== Career statistics ==
Legend
GP	Games played	GS	Games started	MPG	Minutes per game
FG%	Field goal percentage	3P%	3-point field goal percentage	FT%	Free throw percentage
RPG	Rebounds per game	APG	Assists per game	SPG	Steals per game
BPG	Blocks per game	PPG	Points per game	**Bold**	Career high

=== NBA ===
==== Regular season ====
Year	Team	GP	MPG	FG%	FT%	RPG	APG	PPG
1970–71	Atlanta	**51**	8.4	.358	**.763**	.7	.9	3.7
1971–72	Atlanta	9	**12.2**	**.465**	.650	**1.2**	**1.0**	**5.9**
1971–72	Houston	40	6.4	.383	.680	.5	.7	2.9
Career		100	8.0	.379	.721	.7	.8	3.6
