= Eddie Mast =

American basketball player (1948–1994)

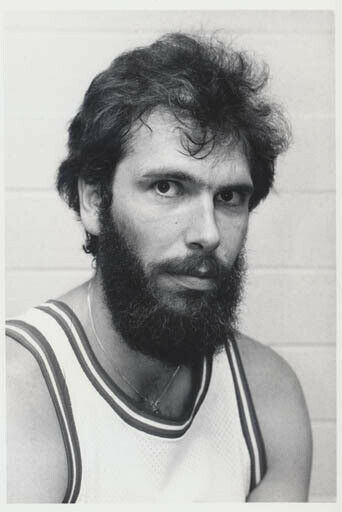
- Mast with the Allentown Jets in 1977

Personal information
- Born: October 3, 1948 Philadelphia, Pennsylvania, U.S.
- Died: October 18, 1994 (aged 45) Easton, Pennsylvania, U.S.
- Listed height: 6 ft 9 in (2.06 m)
- Listed weight: 220 lb (100 kg)

Career information
- College: Temple (1966–1969)
- NBA draft: 1969: 3rd round, 40th overall pick
- Drafted by: New York Knicks
- Playing career: 1969–1983
- Position: Power forward
- Number: 26, 25
- Coaching career: 1978–1985

Career history

Playing
- 1969–1970: Allentown Jets
- 1970–1972: New York Knicks
- 1972–1973: Atlanta Hawks
- 1973–1977; 1978–1981: Allentown / Lehigh Valley Jets
- 1975: Belgium Lions
- 1982–1983: Albany Patroons

Coaching
- 1978–1981: Allentown / Lehigh Valley Jets
- 1983–1985: Louis E. Dieruff HS

Career highlights
- 3× EPBL/EBA champion (1970, 1975, 1976); All-EBA First Team (1976); 3× All-EPBL/EBA/CBA Second Team (1970, 1977, 1979); EPBL Rookie of the Year (1970)
- Stats at NBA.com
- Stats at Basketball Reference

Eddie Mast (October 3, 1948 – October 18, 1994) was an American professional basketball player who played for the New York Knicks and Atlanta Hawks of the National Basketball Association (NBA).

== Early life and education ==
Mast was born October 3, 1948, in Philadelphia. He played college basketball for Temple between 1966 and 1969. He grabbed 22 rebounds to help the Owls beat Boston College and win the 1969 National Invitation Tournament.

== Professional career ==
Mast entered the 1969 NBA draft and was selected by the New York Knicks in the 3rd round with the 40th overall selection. He was not offered a contract, however, and played a season for the Allentown Jets in the Eastern Professional Basketball League, where he was named Rookie of the Year and selected to the All-EPBL Second Team. He won an EPBL championship with the Jets in 1970.

He eventually signed with the Knicks in September 1970. After playing sparingly for two seasons, Mast was traded to the Atlanta Hawks in October 1972 for a second round pick in the 1973 NBA draft.

He wasn't much more successful for the Hawks, posting 2.8 points on average with 42 per cent field goal accuracy and lacking the muscle under the boards to take more than 3.2 rebounds a game. He was released by the team in July 1973.

Rejoining the Knicks during the 1974 offseason, but was cut in September before league's season begann.

Mast played for the Belgium Lions of the European Professional Basketball League in early 1975. He joined the Kentucky Colonels of the American Basketball Association in September 1975. He was waived a month later before playing a game for the Colonels.

Mast ultimately spent most of his career in the Eastern League, which was later renamed the Continental Basketball Association. He won EBA championships with the Jets in 1975 and 1976. He was selected to the All-EBA First Team in 1976 and All-EBA/CBA Second Team in 1977 and 1979. He served as player coach for the Lehigh Valley Jets (formerly the Allentown Jets) until they folded in 1981.

== Post-professional basketball career ==
Following his retirement as a player, Mast served as sales executive and partner for World Timber Corp. in Easton, Pennsylvania, after previously working as a salesman for Martin Guitar in Nazareth.

He served as boys basketball head coach at Louis E. Dieruff High School in Allentown, Pennsylvania, from 1983 to 1985. He also coached Easton Catholic Youth Organization boys and girls basketball teams.

=== Death ===
Mast died of a heart attack on October 18, 1994, while playing a pick-up game of basketball at the Kirby Field House on the campus of Lafayette College. He was said to suffer from Pete Maravich syndrome. Aged 46 at the time of his passing, he had a wife and five children.

== Career statistics ==
Legend
GP	Games played	GS	Games started	MPG	Minutes per game
FG%	Field goal percentage	3P%	3-point field goal percentage	FT%	Free throw percentage
RPG	Rebounds per game	APG	Assists per game	SPG	Steals per game
BPG	Blocks per game	PPG	Points per game	**Bold**	Career high

=== NBA ===
==== Regular season ====
Year	Team	GP	GS	MPG	FG%	FT%	RPG	APG	PPG
1970–71	New York	30	0	5.5	.379	.550	1.9	.1	2.0
1971–72	New York	40	0	6.8	.348	.610	1.8	.3	2.6
1972–73	Atlanta	**42**		**10.6**	**.424**	**.633**	**3.2**	**.9**	**2.8**
Career		112	0	7.9	.385	.604	2.4	.5	2.5

==== Playoffs ====
Year	Team	GP	MPG	FG%	FT%	RPG	APG	PPG
1971	New York	3	3.7	.400	–	1.0	.0	1.3
1972	New York	**9**	2.6	.571	**.200**	.8	.1	1.0
1973	Atlanta	4	**3.8**	**1.000**	–	**1.3**	**.3**	**2.5**
Career		16	3.1	.647	.200	.9	.1	1.4
