= European Professional Basketball League =

1975 professional basketball league

- Sport: Basketball
- Founded: 1974
- First season: 1975
- Folded: 1975
- President: Robert Hecht
- Commissioner: Dick Davis
- No. of teams: 5
- Country: Belgium; Israel; Spain; Switzerland; West Germany
- Continent: FIBA Europe (Europe)
- Last champion: Israel Sabras (1 title)

The European Professional Basketball League (EPBL) was a professional basketball league held in Europe in 1975. Despite being played in five European countries (Belgium, Israel, Spain, Switzerland and West Germany) it was for the most part owned and operated by American investors with virtually no European players taking part. Opposed by most European basketball authorities such as FIBA, it generated little popular support and ended its first and only season prematurely in April 1975.

== Teams ==
Location of teams in the 1975 EPBL.

=== Belgium Lions ===
The Lions, who finished second in the league, were based in Brussels (with the Salle Simonet in Anderlecht as home arena), but also played games in Antwerp and Liège. They drew 1,870 and 2,101 spectators for their first two league games but that number was closer to 400 by the end of the league. The club's owner was businessman Roy Brown from Skokie, Illinois, Les Patrick served as general manager. Former UCLA star John Vallely served as player-coach of a team which also had Joe Ellis, Eddie Mast, Hank Siemiontkowski and one Belgian, Willy Steveniers.

=== Iberia Superstars ===
The Superstars, who finished last in the league, were based in Barcelona (using the Palau Blaugrana as their home arena) but also played games in Badalona, Mataró and L'Hospitalet. Originally created as two separate teams, namely the Catalan Estels (representing Barcelona) and Madrid Superstars, the teams were merged into one in November 1974 to guarantee an even number (at the time) of teams in the league. The teams would have played separately again from the second season onwards. The co-owners were Houston businessman Allen Becker, and Spanish journalist Carlos Pardo, their general manager was Chuck Rohe. Playing in green and blue, their coach was Del Harris and players included Roy Ebron, Pete Cross and Jeff Halliburton The team had an uneasy relationship with the Spanish Basketball Federation who heavily restricted them in the venues and dates of their games. They were effectively banned from Madrid as Raimundo Saporta, both a FIBA and Real Madrid official, did not want them to compete with his club.

=== Israel Sabras ===
The Sabras, named so after the nickname given to native Israelis (despite the fact that no players were Israeli or even Jewish), played in the Yad Eliyahu Arena in Tel Aviv. The best supported team in the league and eventual league winners, they attracted 70,000 fans over 21 home games, including 5,000 fans for a friendly with the Israel national basketball team. This was achieved thanks to constant promotional efforts (for which they were said to have spent between $45,000 and $50,000), with English adverts taken in the press to attract American immigrants, colour ads posted throughout Tel Aviv and radio spots. The team was even able to secure the sponsorship of Tempo, Israel's largest soft drink manufacturer, one month into the competition. The team was owned by businessmen Robert Hecht (regional vice-president of the United States Committee Sports for Israel) and J. Livingston Kosberg, while former National Basketball Association (NBA) public relations director Haskell Cohen served as its general manager. Its coach Herb Brown had players such as league MVP M.L. Carr, Roger Brown, Mike Macaluso, Lon Kruger and Henry Dickerson in his team.

=== Munich Eagles ===
The Eagles, who finished fourth, were based in Munich (using the McGraw Kaserne gym as home court). They were effectively a touring team as they also played in Augsburg, Berlin, Böblingen, Essen, Leverkusen, Sankt Ilgen, Rüsselsheim and even Cuxhaven in the northern point of the country. They struggled to attract fans (with an average of only 400), with highs of 1,500 in Berlin outdone by lows of 150 in Essen. Howard Fine of Baltimore was team owner, former Dallas Chaparrals assistant general manager Lee Meade served as GM. The Eagles were coached by Larry Jones who also played for them, they boasted league top scorer Joe Hamilton and 7-foot-4 center Bob Rosier. Kirkland Rice served as the junior team assistant.

=== Swiss Alpines ===
The Alpines, who finished third, were based in Geneva but also played games in Lausanne, Martigny and Neuchâtel. Banker A.J. Smith and rice farmer B.C. Kirkland from Oak Grove, Louisiana were the team owners. Dean Kirkpatrick, formerly a director of sports development at the University of Houston was general manager while former Nicholls State coach Jack Holley coached the team. Shaler Halimon starred for the team with 20 points a game, also in the team were George Reynolds and Dennis Van Zant.

== Format ==
Each team would play the others ten times (five at home and five away) for a total of forty games per team. League play would have ended by 30 May and playoffs were then to be held in June though no details were given as to how teams would qualify. Teams would then have played exhibition games in July.

=== Rules ===
The EPBL followed the same rules as the American Basketball Association (ABA) and effectively copied its rule book word for word, it even employed former ABA referees such as Ken Sussman. It was played in four-quarters of 12 minutes each, used a 30-second shot clock and notably included the ABA's three-point field goal. Players were sent off after 6 personal fouls, however players could be allowed to stay on court if they conceded extra free throws to the opposing team for each foul from that point onwards. There were also white cards given to players, who then had to leave the court for two minutes. One of the main differences was practical, the key was not rectangular but trapezoidal as that was the standard used in every European court.

=== Player registration ===
FIBA imposed stringent restrictions on the players EPBL clubs were able to sign, the most restrictive being the minimum age limit of 30 for European players (or alternatively players needed to have stopped playing for five years) which meant that only one of the sixty players was European, 36-year-old former Belgian international Willy Steveniers. In addition any European player over the age of 30 could be retained by national federations if they planned to use him as part of their national team. EPBL clubs were also forbidden from signing any American player contracted to an amateur European side. Any player who participated in the league would be banned for life from participating in amateur basketball thereafter, this was the case for Steveniers right after he played his first game.

== History ==
=== First attempt: EBA ===
The concept of an entirely professional basketball league based in Europe was first promoted by Guy Van Den Broeck, coach of the Belgium national basketball team in February 1974. Van Den Broeck was said to be the European representative of ABA commissioner Mike Storen, who had reportedly mandated him to study the possibility of starting a professional competition throughout Europe. He took part in a meeting on 3 February with French club officials such as Guy Papineau (president of ASPO Tours) or René Fiolet (president of Caen BC) to gauge interest in the project. The meeting was productive and a league structure was announced soon after, with a calendar ranging from the following October to April involving eight teams based in major European cities (five franchises in France, Belgium and Israel were said to be ready). Because of the limited number of teams and to follow the American model, teams would play each other repeatedly to guarantee an important number of home games (and ticket sales). A relationship with the ABA would also allow games against touring ABA teams and it was even suggested the league become a division of the American league with eventual intercontinental play. Though French Basketball Federation president Robert Busnel at first declared that the league was not of their concern, the Federation warned that any player signing a pro contract would be banned for life and that it would oppose the rental of municipal arenas to the pros. Van Den Broeck replied in a confrontational tone that he was unfazed by "professional amateurs" who were "afraid they're going to lose the good life when the real pros arrive". Shortly after, however, the Belgium coach was threatened with a lifetime ban by the Belgian Basketball Federation, following which he ceased his involvement in the project.

The project was immediately taken over by Marcel Leclerc, president of football club Olympique de Marseille, who had been present at the earlier meeting. A communique from the organisation was released on 8 March 1974, naming the league the European Basketball Association (EBA) and formally announcing its creation had occurred in Paris a day earlier. Though it nominated French jurist Bernard Ulrich as its manager, the other members of the EBA remained anonymous. The league was said to consist of eight teams in two groups, with four cities already confirmed (though not disclosed) and four to be announced. International Basketball Federation (FIBA) secretary general William Jones openly doubted the project (along with national federations) stating it could not work due as there were too few arenas with a capacity over 10,000 to make it profitable. Leclerc was more confident, stating it would be successful thanks to high level of American players that would compose it. He was set to meet with American officials in early May to get support for his project. However, no further announcements were made and the league never materialised.

=== FIBA opposition to the IBA ===
In late April 1974 a syndicate of American businessmen led by the France-based John Coburn announced the creation of the International Basketball Association (IBA) in Paris. Though the league also aimed to create a professional basketball competition in Europe, it adamantly stressed it had no relation whatsoever with the EBA. It had already reportedly sold eight franchises in seven countries (France, Spain, West Germany, Holland, Belgium, Italy and Switzerland) and planned to add up to four more to form two divisions of four to six teams each. A draft of American players not contracted to the NBA or ABA was planned for September, with league play set for November. Though the IBA announced Al McGuire as manager of one of the franchises, the Marquette coach publicly stated he had no intention of coaching in Europe.

Coburn, who had just sold his stake in the World Hockey Association's New England Whalers, later fleshed out the composition of the league which would contain teams in Barcelona, Madrid, Brussels, Geneva, The Hague, Munich, Rome and a team shared between Lyon and Grenoble. The league was to have American-European ownership though in effect most of the investors (such as the Development Company of Monroe, Louisiana for the Geneva franchise) would be American. Each franchise cost $60,000 and Coburn warned investors they should be prepared to lose money for the first two years. Some observers like The New York Times' Bernard Kirsch noted the IBA's connection to the unstable WHA and World Football League through Coburn and Munich manager Lee Meade (formerly associated with the ABA, WHA and World TeamTennis), expressing pessimism over the league's stability and its ability to attract European fans. Teams would be composed of 10 players each, with typical salaries of between $15,000 and $20,000 per player. Due to these wages (said to be around $200,000 per team) and operational costs (less than in the U.S. thanks to shorter travel times) it was calculated that each team would have to make a turnover of around $500,000 to make it worthwhile. Most of this was to come from ticket sales of the 62 games planned per team, with an average of 6,000 spectators per game hoped for.

Though the IBA had announced its league was sanctioned by international basketball authorities, FIBA publicly denied sanctioning the league in any way. In fact, William Jones sent a letter in August to national federations expressing his resolute opposition to any professional league in Europe, threatening to expel any player, referee or official who helped it in any way. He also threatened to ban professional teams from any arena used by amateur teams. Despite this, Jones selected Raimundo Saporta and Borislav Stanković to serve as FIBA representatives in talks with the IBA to take place on 3 September in Geneva. This meeting and another on 4 October in Rome proved inconclusive and relations between the two parties seemed strained beyond repair. However, the IBA owners resented Coburn's stance in these negotiations and, after he threatened to scrap the project, contacted FIBA directly to negotiate. They offered to let FIBA have complete oversight of the league and impose its conditions. Coburn was hence removed from the project and the IBA name left with him.

=== League creation: EPBL ===
The league was officially named the European Professional Basketball League (EPBL), with its headquarters in Munich, San Diego State coach Dick Davis had resigned to serve as its commissioner. The International Federation would regulate the league conjointly with national federations, deciding how players would be able to make the irreversible transition to becoming professionals. One of the first concessions was to limit the number of games to 40 (down from 62). A compromise was reached on 18 November between national federations, domestic clubs and professional clubs which broadly followed the requests FIBA had made:

-Clubs would have to pay 1,000$ to the respective federation for each game played in their home country.
-Federations would have the final say on what venues could be used by the pros (conjointly with amateur clubs).
-All of the league's players would be American, with no Europeans under 30 allowed to be signed.

Each professional team was dependent on its respective federation as to where and when it played. Overall, teams were restricted to 25 games overall in their country (5 of which had to be friendly games). Additionally they were only allowed to play on Friday's and Monday's to avoid clashing with domestic matches, unless granted exemptions from their federations. A way to get an exemption to play on a weekend would be to partner with a local team, for example FC Barcelona for the Iberia Superstars, wherein the professionals would cede 40% of ticket sales to the amateur side.

It held its player draft on 19 November 1974 in the New York Biltmore Hotel as 166 players were shared between the ten teams. Gene Moore was the first pick (by Barcelona), followed by Shaler Halimon (Switzerland). Other familiar players (mostly from their college days) were John Vallely, Joe Ellis (both Belgium), Luther Rackley, Bill Chamberlain (both Lyon-Grenoble) and Wendell Hudson (London). Dick Davis stressed that none of the league's players would be taken directly from NBA or ABA teams to avoid a salary war with the more established leagues. Effectively the top EPBL players would earn at most $25,000 a year whereas U.S.-based players could earn around $90,000. This meant that the players drafted were described as "marginal pros from the two major leagues". Halimon, the first player drafted to say he would sign a contract, had averaged 6.3 points a game throughout his five-year NBA and ABA career for example. Some of the players such as Eddie Mast or Bob Rosier had trialled with teams in France and Italy but had not been retained. It was also clarified that all of the league's players would be American for the first season, with European players to be added in following seasons once the league established itself.

The franchises were announced at the same time, with the eight teams participating in the draft being the Tel Aviv Sabras, London BICs, Swiss Alpines, Belgium Lions, Madrid Superstars and unnamed teams from Barcelona, Lyon‐Grenoble and Munich. Five teams announced their coaches, respectively Belgium (John Vallely), Tel Aviv (Herb Brown), Munich (former 76er Larry Jones who would also play), Switzerland (Jack Holley) and Madrid (Beryl Shipley, infamous for his recruiting violations at Southwestern Louisiana). The London team had to pull out of the league shortly after as construction delays meant their arena would not be ready until May 1975. To bring the number of teams to an even number it was then decided that the team from Barcelona, the Catalan Estels, and the Madrid Superstars would be merged for the first season before playing separately the following season. Their respective owners - Sid Franklin and Carlos Pardo for Barcelona, Alan Becker and Enrique Godoy for Madrid - met and agreed to base the team in Barcelona but also play games in Madrid and elsewhere in Spain. Faced with an unwelcoming attitude by French basketball authorities (especially Pierre Mazeaud, sports state secretary) and the country's taxation system, the investors from the Lyon-Grenoble also pulled out of the league., leaving five teams in the competition which would start on 17 January, namely the Superstars, Belgium Lions, Israel Sabras, Munich Eagles and Swiss Alpines.

=== League play (1975) ===
The opening game took place in Munich's Olympic basketball stadium on 17 January 1975, William Jones conducted the tip-off. The home team defeated the Israel Sabras 96-91 before the second game of the double-header saw the Belgium Lions defeat the Swiss Alpines 111–93. Despite some interest from locally based US Army servicemen and the presence of an American TV crew, the turnout proved a disappointment for the organisers as only around 400 to 500 spectators were scattered round a 6,000-seat arena.

The Belgians played their first home game on 20 January in Brussels, beating the Sabras 118–117. The Lions were also victorious two days later in Liege, beating the Iberia Superstars 105–99 in the Spaniards' debut. The Swiss played their first home game (in Neuchâtel) on 25 January, losing 105-113 to the Superstars. The Superstars only played their first game in Spain on 3 February (in Mataró) after long negotiations with the Spanish federation, they lost 106-107 to the Eagles. The league organised a mini-tournament during the Geneva Motor Show in March 1975. Held in the Patinoire des Vernets it pitted the four best teams in the league (the Lions, Sabras, Eagles and hosts Alpines). The Swiss beat the Eagles 110–91 in the final on 15 March, while the Lions took third place after downing the Sabras 118–97.

The Belgium Lions had raced into the league lead with early wins and at one point held a five win lead over other teams. After a slow start to the season in which the Sabras amassed a 2–7 record whilst playing on the road, the team won eight games in a row to climb up the league table. The two teams met in Israel in late March for a three-game series that would determine the league leader. The home side won three games in a row to replace the Lions at first place. They came back from a 24-point deficit with 12 minutes to go in one of the games, before themselves squandering a 30 points lead in the final game, though they still won 118–104.

On 27 March 1975 it was announced that the league schedule would be cut by ten games and that playoffs would be played between the best ranked sides (namely the Sabras, Lions and Alpines) in a double knock-out format (with Israel receiving a bye) on 3 April in Tel Aviv. The league ended a few days later on the 31st however as both the Belgium and the Swiss teams refused to travel to Israel for the playoffs citing security concerns amidst the ongoing Arab–Israeli conflict. Officials from the Israeli team were incensed as the two had played league games there only a few weeks earlier. Team president (also EPBL president) Bob Hecht offered financial incentives for the teams to complete the playoffs to no avail. It was assumed that the main reasons for this withdrawal were financial as those teams were taking heavy losses and wanted to avoid the costs of travelling and paying players. As the best-ranked team in the league with a 20–10 record, Israel Sabras were crowned league winners that same day.

The Lions finished second with a 17–10 record, the Alpines third (15-13), Eagles fourth (10-18) and Super Stars last (7-18). Joe Hamilton (Munich) was league top-scorer with 24 points per game, followed by teammate Larry Jones with 23. Roger Brown (Israel) led the rebounding charts with 14 per game ahead of Eddie Mast (Belgium) with 11. Jones and Hamilton traded places in the assists ranking as the former led with 7 per game compared to 4 for the latter. M.L. Carr (Israel) was named the league MVP.

== Aftermath ==
After the season ended, Munich played and won a friendly against German Basketball Cup winner SSV Hagen. The income from that game was seized by the German Basketball Federation as the club reportedly had not paid all the fees owed for playing in the country. This was seemingly to be the last game of the poorly-supported Eagles. Meanwhile, the Belgium Lions had refused to pay any of the $1,000 per game fees to the Belgian Federation and would likely be barred from playing in the country again. Iberia Superstars officials criticised the Spanish federation and accused it of not having respected the deal agreed between them (the team had been prevented from playing in Madrid thanks to Saporta's influence). They challenged amateur clubs Real Madrid and FC Barcelona (who did not answer) and stated their intention to return the following season. The Sabras played a friendly against the Israel national basketball team, winning by 21 points. Haskell, the team's manager was confident of returning the next season. Jack Holley and Shaler Halimon of the Alpines organised summer camps for local youths in Geneva through June and July.

At the time of the last regular season game it was announced that the league would return for a second season on 15 November 1975, with a possible eight teams taking part. League president (and Sabras co-owner) Bob Hecht stated in March 1975 that league operatives had not expected to make an operating profit the first year and there had "been no disappointments". At a meeting in Antwerp on 9 April between Hecht and Davis and FIBA representatives such as Saporta and Busnel it emerged that the EPBL had lost 2,5 million dollars during the season (though part of this sum could be deducted from American taxes). Despite this, league representatives were confident a second season would take place. FIBA stressed that the same conditions would apply and that the EPBL would be collectively responsible for any of its clubs' failure to follow these conditions (such as the Lions not paying the Belgium federation). Jess Smith, co-owner of the Swiss Alpines, declared in June that a league meeting would be held in Houston and that the league was looking to add franchises, possibly in England, Italy, Ireland, Yugoslavia or France. Echoing Hecht's statement that they expected a loss for the first year, he said team owners saw a future second season as "a break-even year". Despite these statements, a second EPBL season never happened and the league silently disappeared.

=== Reception ===
The level of play was said to be relatively good, with an emphasis on creativity and dynamism that clashed with the more formulaic and methodical style usually seen in Europe. Another difference was the increased physicality and frequent fouls the rules allowed, with Holley describing "extremely rough play". Jean-Jacques Maleval from France's L'Équipe was impressed by the spectacular shots made despite aggressive defending, noting the rhythm would be hard to follow for European teams. He also highlighted the quality of the guards' playmaking and ball-handling, conversely noting the centers were less dominant (European amateurs teams tended to exclusively recruit tall forwards as foreign players). Other observers noted the contrast between talented players such as Vallely or Jeff Halliburton and their more anonymous teammates. League president (and Sabras co-owner) Bob Hecht said that EPBL teams were not "on a par with the top teams in the NBA and ABA" but could rival "the worst teams in those leagues".

Observer's such as Pierre Tessier from L'Équipe Basket Magazine pondered whether the European public would be willing to watch a limited number of teams play each other repeatedly (as in the ABA and NBA) within a short period of time. Israel Sabras manager Haskell Cohen lamented that the late start of the season and the cohabitation between amateur and professional clubs meant his club had to play nine home games over ten days, something not even New York crowds could countenance. A similar drawback was the difficult task of creating a fan base from the ground up without any local players or American players known to the European public. In effect most teams struggled to attract crowds as team owners were surprised by the lack of popular support (as averages of at least 1,500 were needed to break even). Belgium Lions trainer Tom Shackelford claimed his team started with about 1,800 spectators which "dwindled down to 300 and 400". The Munich Eagles were also said to draw 400, the Swiss Alpines drew slightly more with around 800 per game. Games were often organised as double-headers with another game played prior to the EPBL one. For example, in Switzerland, the Alpines' games were preceded by encounters between domestic league teams, with the amateur teams taking a percentage of ticket sales. This led Swiss Le Temps journalist Jean-Pierre Gatoni to observe that only dedicated basketball fans would be prepared to go to these games weekly and these could be hard to find in countries like Switzerland. This was compounded by the American style of entertainment offered which called for many play stoppages and on-court entertainment such as cheerleaders, which meant that games could last more than two hours, something the European public was unused to.

The league's logistics were also slightly haphazard, according to Swiss Alpines coach Jack Holley the team had to practice by "running 300-yard wind sprints down the halls of a hotel in Munich" before the league opener as training facilities were not available yet. Holley also stressed the amount of travel the teams had to go through. For example, over two days, the Alpines took a 9-hour train ride from Geneva to Brussels, the next morning caught a 7-hour train to Cuxhaven, Germany, on the North Sea, the next day had a 27-hour train ride to Barcelona on the Mediterranean.

What all observers agreed was that the league promoters had been completely ignorant of the European context and their arrogance meant they did not cater the project to European consumers. Former Munich Eagles manager Lee Meade called the league an "ill-fated effort by some American entrepreneurs who thought because they had money they could shove pro basketball down the throats of Europeans." This meant EPBL owners and managers made little effort to promote their league (with few ads placed in the media) as they assumed bringing professional American-style basketball would be enough to attract fans. Conversely, the most successful team both on and off the court were the Israel Sabras who had a clear promotional strategy and invested heavily in advertising. Despite economic downturn in the country and competition from popular "amateur" clubs such as Maccabi Tel Aviv the Sabras managed to gain a loyal following, attracting over 3,000 fans per game, far more than the average of 400 for Israeli league games. Despite this the team predicted a loss of $260,000 for the season, as ticket prices were low (with many discounts for military personnel or children) and they had to pay their national federation for each home game, a situation shared by all EPBL teams. The only winners in the league's demise were FIBA and its leader William Jones who had succeeded in delaying the advent of professionalism in Europe.

== Notable players and coaches ==
- (United States) Pete Cross Iberia Superstars
- (United States) Jeff Halliburton Iberia Superstars
- (United States) Del Harris Iberia Superstars (coach)
- (United States) John Vallely Belgium Lions (also coach)
- (United States) Joe Ellis Belgium Lions
- Willy Steveniers Belgium Lions
- (United States) Herb Brown Israel Sabras (coach)
- (United States) M.L. Carr Israel Sabras
- (United States) Roger Brown Israel Sabras
- (United States) Lon Kruger Israel Sabras
- (United States) Henry Dickerson Israel Sabras
- (United States) Joe Hamilton Munich Eagles
- (United States) Larry Jones Munich Eagles (also coach)
- (United States) Shaler Halimon Swiss Alpines
