= 1973 NBA draft =

Basketball player selection

General information
- Sport: Basketball
- Dates: April 24, 1973 (first 10 rounds); May 5, 1973 (remaining rounds)
- Location: New York City, New York

Overview
- 211 total selections in 20 rounds
- League: NBA
- First selection: Doug Collins, Philadelphia 76ers
- Hall of Famers: 1: F George McGinnis

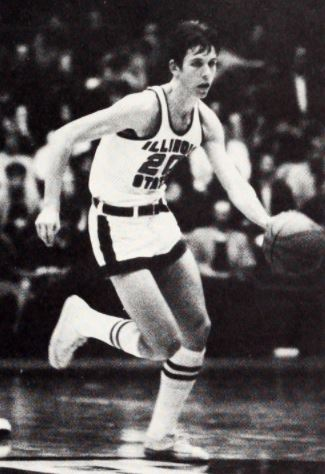
Doug Collins was selected first overall by the Philadelphia 76ers.

The 1973 NBA draft was the 27th annual draft of the National Basketball Association (NBA). The draft was held on April 24 and May 5, 1973, before the 1973–74 season. In this draft, 17 NBA teams took turns selecting amateur U.S. college basketball players and other eligible players, including international players. The first two picks in the draft belonged to the teams that finished last in each conference, with the order determined by a coin flip. The Philadelphia 76ers won the coin flip and were awarded the first overall pick, while the Portland Trail Blazers were awarded the second pick. The remaining first-round picks and the subsequent rounds were assigned to teams in reverse order of their win–loss record in the previous season. Prior to the draft, the Baltimore Bullets relocated to Landover, Maryland, and became the Capital Bullets. The Philadelphia 76ers were awarded an extra first-round draft pick as compensation when the Seattle SuperSonics signed John Brisker. A player who had finished his four-year college eligibility was eligible for selection. If a player left college early, he would not be eligible for selection until his college class graduated. Before the draft, 11 college underclassmen were declared eligible for selection under the "hardship" rule. These players had applied and gave evidence of financial hardship to the league, which granted them the right to start earning their living by starting their professional careers earlier. The draft consisted of 20 rounds comprising the selection of 211 players.

This was the last NBA draft to last until any number of rounds, or until teams run out of prospects; from the next year's draft until the 1984 draft they were fixed to 10 rounds.

== Draft selections and draftee career notes ==
Doug Collins from Illinois State University was selected first overall by the Philadelphia 76ers. Jim Brewer from the University of Minnesota was second, taken by the Cleveland Cavaliers with a pick obtained from the Blazers in a trade. Ernie DiGregorio, from Providence College, was selected third by the Buffalo Braves, and went on to win the Rookie of the Year Award. George McGinnis, selected by the 76ers with the 22nd pick, is the only player from the 1973 draft who was selected to both the All-NBA Team and the All-Star Game. Collins, 5th pick Kermit Washington, and 50th pick Larry Kenon, are the only other players from this draft who were selected to an All-Star Game. Collins's achievements include four All-Star Game selections. After retiring as a player, he went on to coach the Chicago Bulls, the Detroit Pistons, the Philadelphia 76ers and the Washington Wizards. Brewer was a member of the 1982 NBA champion Los Angeles Lakers. He later played basketball in Europe, earning the 1983 Euroleague championship with the Ford Cantù. McGinnis had already played in the American Basketball Association (ABA) prior to the draft. He left college after his sophomore year in 1971 to play with the Indiana Pacers for four seasons. He later played in the NBA with the Philadelphia 76ers, the team that drafted him, after the ABA–NBA merger in 1976. He had one ABA Most Valuable Player Award, three ABA All-Star Game selections, three NBA All-Star Game selections, three All-ABA Team selections and two All-NBA Team selections. Kenon initially opted to play in the ABA, spending three seasons there before joining the NBA with the San Antonio Spurs when both leagues merged. He was selected to three ABA All-Star Games and two NBA All-Star Games.

Mike D'Antoni, the 20th pick, only played four seasons in the NBA and ABA before he moved to Italy with the Olimpia Milano. He played there for thirteen seasons and won five Italian league titles and two Euroleague titles. After retiring as a player, he coached Olimpia Milano and Benetton Treviso, leading the latter to two Italian league titles. He then returned to the NBA and coached three NBA teams. He won the Coach of the Year Award in 2005 with the Phoenix Suns and in 2017 with the Houston Rockets. M. L. Carr, the 76th pick, earned two NBA championships with the Boston Celtics in 1981 and 1984 as a player. Carr later became the Celtics' head coach for two seasons in the 1990s. Two other players drafted also went on to have coaching careers in the NBA: 21st pick Allan Bristow and 66th pick George Karl.

In the fifth round, the Los Angeles Lakers selected Krešimir Ćosić from Brigham Young University with the 84th pick. However, he opted to return to Yugoslavia after his college career. Ćosić had a successful career in Europe, winning numerous league and club titles, as well as six gold medals with the Yugoslavian national team. For his achievements, he has been inducted to the Basketball Hall of Fame. He has also been inducted by the International Basketball Federation (FIBA) to the FIBA Hall of Fame. The Atlanta Hawks used the 79th pick to draft Dave Winfield, who starred at both baseball and basketball at the University of Minnesota. He was also drafted in three other major sport leagues; Major League Baseball (MLB), the National Football League (NFL) and the ABA. He chose baseball and played 22 seasons in MLB.

== Key ==
Pos.	G	F	C
Position	Guard	Forward	Center

^	Denotes player who has been inducted to the Naismith Memorial Basketball Hall of Fame
*	Denotes player who has been selected for at least one All-Star Game and All-NBA Team
^{+}	Denotes player who has been selected for at least one All-Star Game
^{#}	Denotes player who has never appeared in an NBA regular-season or playoff game
^{~}	Denotes player who has been selected as Rookie of the Year

== Draft ==
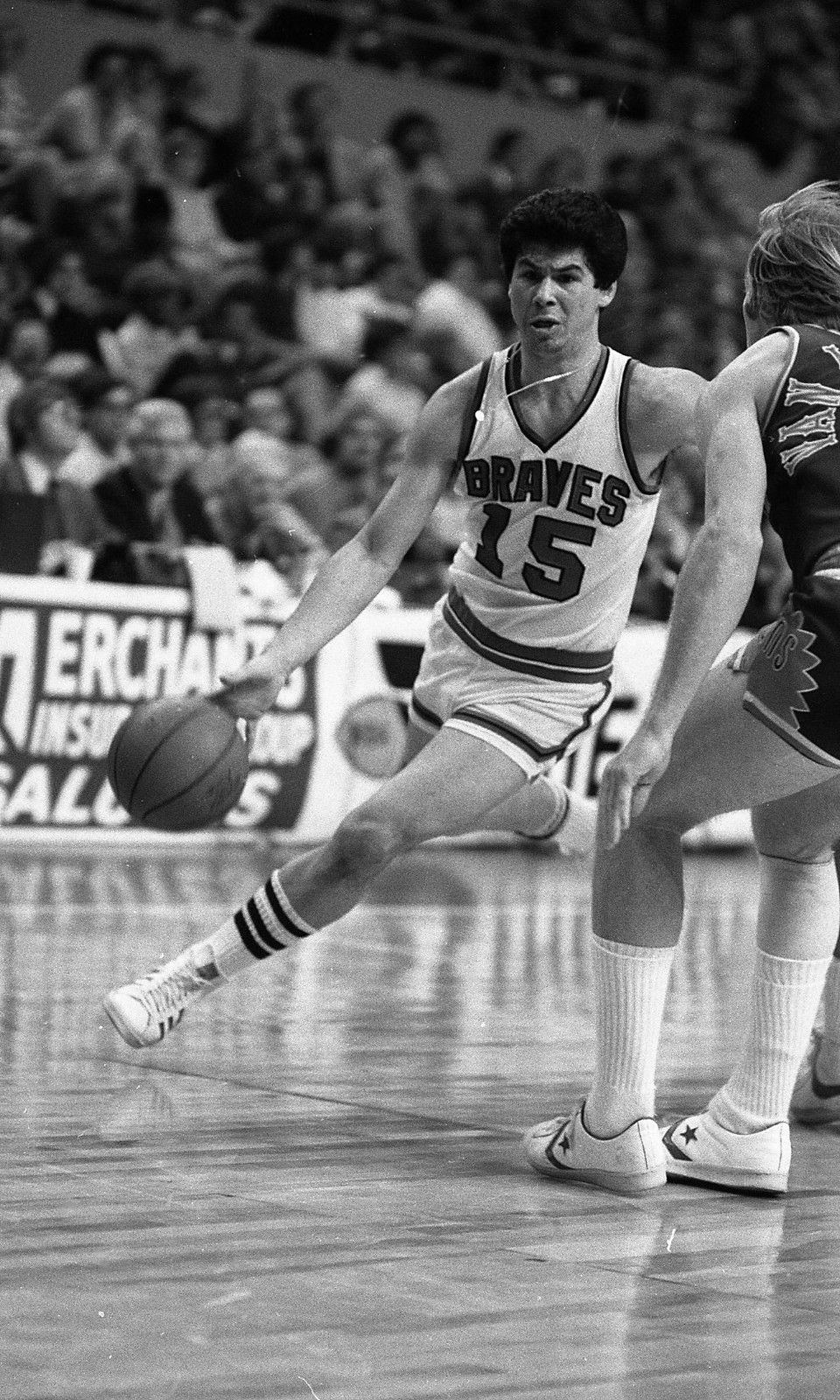
Ernie DiGregorio was selected 3rd overall by the Buffalo Braves.

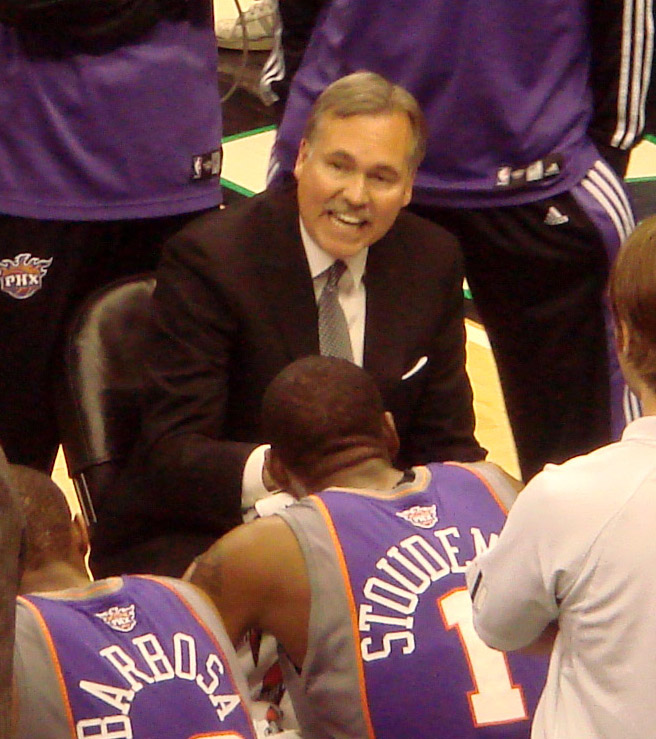
Mike D'Antoni was selected 20th overall by the Kansas City-Omaha Kings.

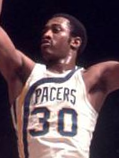
George McGinnis was selected 22nd overall by the Philadelphia 76ers.

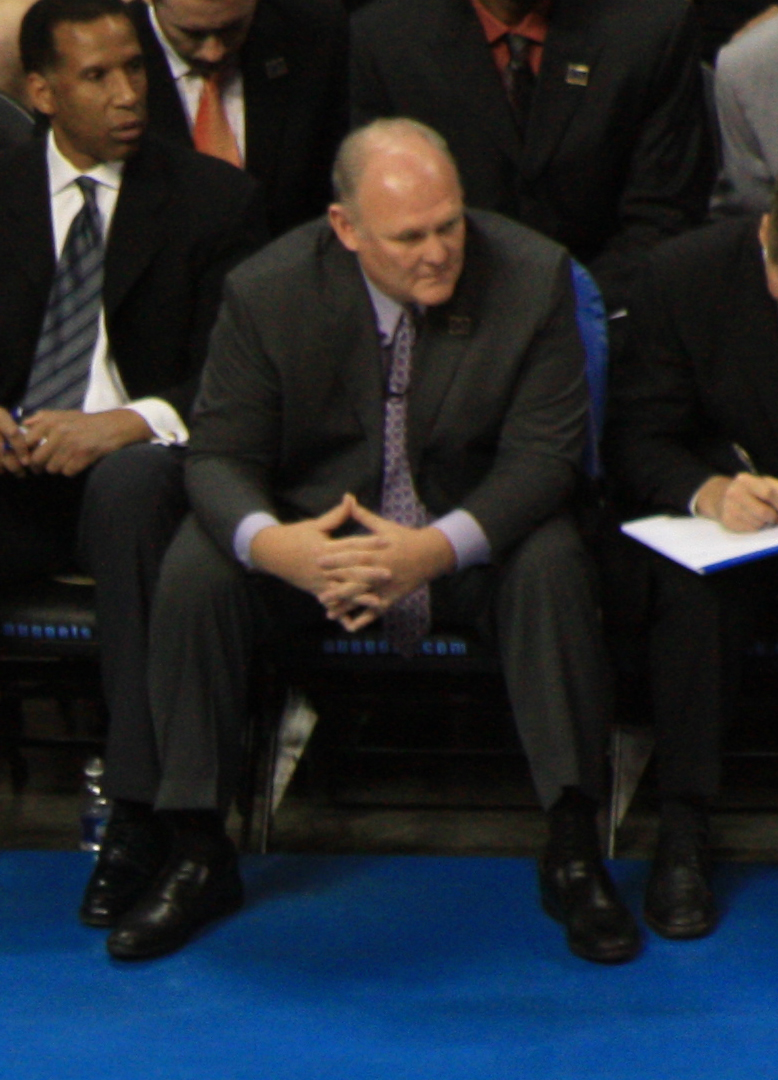
George Karl was selected 66th overall by the New York Knicks.

Round	Pick	Player	Pos.	Nationality	Team	School/club team
1	1	Doug Collins^{^}	G/F	United States	Philadelphia 76ers	Illinois State (Sr.)
1	2	Jim Brewer	F/C	United States	Cleveland Cavaliers (from Portland)^{[a]}	Minnesota (Sr.)
1	3	Ernie DiGregorio^{~}	G	United States	Buffalo Braves	Providence (Sr.)
1	4	Mike Green	C/F	United States	Seattle SuperSonics	Louisiana Tech (Sr.)
1	5	Kermit Washington^{+}	F/C	United States	Los Angeles Lakers (from Cleveland)^{[b]}	American (Sr.)
1	6	Ed Ratleff	F/G	United States	Houston Rockets	Long Beach State (Sr.)
1	7	Ron Behagen	F/C	United States	Kansas City-Omaha Kings	Minnesota (Sr.)
1	8	Mike Bantom	F/C	United States	Phoenix Suns	Saint Joseph's (Sr.)
1	9	Dwight Jones	F/C	United States	Atlanta Hawks (from Detroit)^{[c]}	Houston (Jr.)
1	10	John Brown	F	United States	Atlanta Hawks	Missouri (Sr.)
1	11	Kevin Joyce^{#}	G	United States	Golden State Warriors	South Carolina (Sr.)
1	12	Kevin Kunnert	C/F	United States	Chicago Bulls	Iowa (Sr.)
1	13	Nick Weatherspoon	F	United States	Capital Bullets	Illinois (Sr.)
1	14	Mel Davis	F	United States	New York Knicks	St. John's (Sr.)
1	15	Barry Parkhill^{#}	G	United States	Portland Trail Blazers (from Los Angeles via Cleveland)^{[a]}	Virginia (Sr.)
1	16	Swen Nater	C	Netherlands	Milwaukee Bucks	UCLA (Sr.)
1	17	Steve Downing	C	United States	Boston Celtics	Indiana (Sr.)
1	18	Raymond Lewis^{#}	G	United States	Philadelphia 76ers	Cal State L.A. (So.)
2	19	Louie Nelson	G	United States	Capital Bullets (from Philadelphia)^{[d]}	Washington (Sr.)
2	20	Mike D'Antoni	G	Italy	Kansas City-Omaha Kings (from Buffalo via Detroit)^{[e]}	Marshall (Sr.)
2	21	Allan Bristow	F/G	United States	Philadelphia 76ers (from Portland)^{[f]}	Virginia Tech (Sr.)
2	22	George McGinnis^	F/C	United States	Philadelphia 76ers (from Seattle)^{[g]}	Indiana Pacers (ABA)
2	23	Billy Schaeffer^{#}	F	United States	Los Angeles Lakers (from Cleveland)^{[b]}	St. John's (Sr.)
2	24	Kevin Stacom	G	United States	Chicago Bulls (from Houston)^{[h]}	Providence (Sr.)
2	25	Larry McNeill	F/G	United States	Kansas City-Omaha Kings	Marquette (Jr.)
2	26	Allan Hornyak^{#}	G	United States	Cleveland Cavaliers (from Phoenix)^{[i]}	Ohio State (Sr.)
2	27	Tom Ingelsby	G	United States	Atlanta Hawks (from Detroit)^{[j]}	Villanova (Sr.)
2	28	Patrick McFarland^{#}	F/G	United States	New York Knicks (from Atlanta)^{[k]}	Saint Joseph's (Sr.)
2	29	Derrek Dickey	F	United States	Golden State Warriors	Cincinnati (Sr.)
2	30	Wendell Hudson^{#}	F	United States	Chicago Bulls	Alabama (Sr.)
2	31	Jim Chones	C/F	United States	Los Angeles Lakers (from Capital)^{[l]}	New York Nets (ABA)
2	32	Caldwell Jones	C/F	United States	Philadelphia 76ers (from New York via Chicago)^{[m]}	Albany State (Sr.)
2	33	Gary Melchionni	G	United States	Phoenix Suns (from Milwaukee via Philadelphia)^{[n]}	Duke (Sr.)
2	34	Pete Perry^{#}	C	United States	Los Angeles Lakers	Pan American (Sr.)
2	35	Phil Hankinson	F	United States	Boston Celtics	Pennsylvania (Sr.)
3	36	Ted Manakas	G	United States	Atlanta Hawks (from Philadelphia)^{[o]}	Princeton (Sr.)
3	37	Jim O'Brien^{#}	F	United States	Cleveland Cavaliers	Maryland (Sr.)
3	38	Ken Charles	G	Trinidad and Tobago	Buffalo Braves	Fordham (Sr.)
3	39	Martin Terry^{#}	G	United States	Chicago Bulls	Arkansas (Sr.)
3	40	Ozie Edwards^{#}	G	United States	Cleveland Cavaliers	Oklahoma City (Sr.)
3	41	James Lister^{#}	C	United States	Cleveland Cavaliers	Sam Houston (Sr.)
3	42	Joe Reaves	F	United States	Phoenix Suns (from Kansas City–Omaha)^{[p]}	Bethel (Tennessee) (Sr.)
3	43	Steve Mitchell^{#}	F	United States	Phoenix Suns	Kansas State (Sr.)
3	44	Bo Lamar	G	United States	Detroit Pistons	Southwestern Louisiana (Sr.)
3	45	Leonard Gray	F	United States	Atlanta Hawks	Long Beach State (Sr.)
3	46	Jim Resteck^{#}	F	United States	Golden State Warriors	Auburn (Sr.)
3	47	Steve Newsome^{#}	F	United States	Chicago Bulls	Houston (Sr.)
3	48	Tom Kozelko	F	United States	Capital Bullets	Toledo (Sr.)
3	49	Allie McGuire	G	United States	New York Knicks	Marquette (Sr.)
3	50	Larry Kenon^{+}	F	United States	Detroit Pistons (from Los Angeles)^{[q]}	Memphis State (Jr.)
3	51	E. C. Coleman	F	United States	Houston Rockets (from Milwaukee)^{[r]}	Houston Baptist (Sr.)
3	52	Martinez Denmon^{#}	G	United States	Boston Celtics	Iowa State (Sr.)
4	53	Darryl Minniefield^{#}	C	United States	Philadelphia 76ers	New Mexico (Sr.)
4	54	Doug Little^{#}	G	United States	Buffalo Braves	Oregon (Sr.)
4	55	Bird Averitt	G	United States	Portland Trail Blazers	Pepperdine (Jr.)
4	56	June Harris^{#}	G	United States	Seattle SuperSonics	North Carolina A&T (Sr.)
4	57	Luke Witte	C	United States	Cleveland Cavaliers	Ohio State (Sr.)
4	58	Lee Colburn^{#}	F	United States	Houston Rockets	South Dakota State (Sr.)
4	59	Clyde Turner^{#}	F	United States	Milwaukee Bucks	Minnesota (Sr.)
4	60	Ronnie Robinson^{#}	F	United States	Phoenix Suns	Memphis (Sr.)
4	61	Ken Brady^{#}	C	United States	Detroit Pistons	Michigan (Sr.)
4	62	James Brown^{#}	F	United States	Atlanta Hawks	Harvard (Sr.)
4	63	Ron King^{#}	G	United States	Golden State Warriors	Florida State (Sr.)
4	64	Mark Sibley	G	United States	Chicago Bulls	Northwestern (Sr.)
4	65	Aron Stewart^{#}	G	United States	Capital Bullets	Richmond (Jr.)
4	66	George Karl	G	United States	New York Knicks	North Carolina (Sr.)
4	67	Harry Rogers^{#}	F	United States	Milwaukee Bucks	Saint Louis (Sr.)
4	68	Larry Finch^{#}	G	United States	Los Angeles Lakers	Memphis (Sr.)
4	69	Rich Fuqua^{#}	G	United States	Boston Celtics	Oral Roberts (Sr.)
5	70	Reggie Royals^{#}	C	United States	Philadelphia 76ers	Florida State (Sr.)
5	71	Fran Costello^{#}	F	United States	Portland Trail Blazers	Providence (Sr.)
5	72	Randy Knoll^{#}	F	United States	Buffalo Braves	Marshall (Sr.)
5	73	Chuck Iverson^{#}	F	United States	Seattle SuperSonics	South Dakota (Sr.)
5	74	John Coughran	F	United States	Cleveland Cavaliers	California (Sr.)
5	75	Gary Rhoades^{#}	G	United States	Houston Rockets	Colorado State (Sr.)
5	76	M. L. Carr	F	United States	Kansas City-Omaha Kings	Guilford (Sr.)
5	77	Clinton Harris^{#}	F	United States	Phoenix Suns	Iowa State (Sr.)
5	78	Henry Wilmore^{#}	G	United States	Detroit Pistons	Michigan (Sr.)
5	79	Dave Winfield^{#}	F	United States	Atlanta Hawks	Minnesota (Sr.)
5	80	Nate Stephens^{#}	C	United States	Golden State Warriors	Long Beach State (Sr.)
5	81	Roy Simpson^{#}	F	United States	Chicago Bulls	Furman (Sr.)
5	82	Danny Traylor^{#}	C	United States	Capital Bullets	South Carolina (Sr.)
5	83	Dennis Bell	F	United States	New York Knicks	Drake (Sr.)
5	84	Krešimir Ćosić^{#}	C	Yugoslavia	Los Angeles Lakers	BYU (Sr.)
5	85	Larry Jackson^{#}	G	United States	Milwaukee Bucks	Northern Illinois (Sr.)
5	86	Byron Jones^{#}	F	United States	Boston Celtics	San Francisco (Sr.)
6	87	Sterling Wright^{#}	F	United States	Philadelphia 76ers	Lincoln (Pennsylvania) (Sr.)
6	88	Mike Macaluso	F	United States	Buffalo Braves	Canisius (Sr.)
6	89	Neal Jurgensen^{#}	F	United States	Portland Trail Blazers	Oregon State (Sr.)
6	90	Bill McCoy^{#}	G	United States	Seattle SuperSonics	Northern Iowa (Sr.)
6	91	Willie Calvert^{#}	C	United States	Cleveland Cavaliers	Abilene Christian (Sr.)
6	92	Tom Peck^{#}	F	United States	Houston Rockets	Wisconsin–Eau Claire (Sr.)
6	93	Mike Quick^{#}	G	United States	Kansas City–Omaha Kings	San Francisco (Sr.)
6	94	Gene Doyle^{#}	F	United States	Phoenix Suns	Holy Cross (Sr.)
6	95	Dennis Johnson^{#}	F	United States	Detroit Pistons	Ferris State (Sr.)
6	96	John Williamson	G	United States	Atlanta Hawks	New Mexico State (Jr.)
6	97	Bob Lauriski^{#}	F	United States	Golden State Warriors	Utah State (Sr.)
6	98	Johnny Neumann	G/F	United States	Chicago Bulls	Memphis Tams (ABA)
6	99	Mike Allocco^{#}	F	United States	Capital Bullets	Stonehill (Sr.)
6	100	Lawrence Lilly^{#}	C	United States	New York Knicks	Alabama State (Sr.)
6	101	James Floyd^{#}	F	United States	Milwaukee Bucks	Shaw College (Jr.)
6	102	David Brent^{#}	C	United States	Los Angeles Lakers	Jacksonville (So.)
6	103	Joe Caffeyky^{#}	G	United States	Boston Celtics	NC State (Sr.)
7	104	James Greene^{#}	F	United States	Philadelphia 76ers	Kentucky Wesleyan (Sr.)
7	105	Larry Hollyfield^{#}	F	United States	Portland Trail Blazers	UCLA (Sr.)
7	106	Tim Bassett	F/C	United States	Buffalo Braves	Georgia (Sr.)
7	107	Jim Andrews^{#}	C	United States	Seattle SuperSonics	Kentucky (Sr.)
7	108	Larry Farmer^{#}	F	United States	Cleveland Cavaliers	UCLA (Sr.)
7	109	Fred DeVaughn^{#}	F	United States	Houston Rockets	Westmont (Sr.)
7	110	Mike Jeffries^{#}	G	United States	Kansas City–Omaha Kings	Missouri (Sr.)
7	111	Jerry Bisbano^{#}	G	United States	Phoenix Suns	Southwestern Louisiana (Sr.)
7	112	Fred Smiley^{#}	G	United States	Detroit Pistons	Northwood (Sr.)
7	113	Pete Harris^{#}	F	United States	Atlanta Hawks	Stephen F. Austin (Sr.)
7	114	Steve Smith^{#}	F	United States	Golden State Warriors	Loyola Marymount (Sr.)
7	115	Billy Harris^{#}	G	United States	Chicago Bulls	Northern Illinois (Sr.)
7	116	Ronnie Hogue^{#}	G	United States	Capital Bullets	Georgia (Sr.)
7	117	Mike Moore^{#}	F	United States	New York Knicks	Manhattan (Sr.)
7	118	Nate Hawthorne	G	United States	Los Angeles Lakers	Southern Illinois (Sr.)
7	119	Eddie Childress^{#}	G	United States	Milwaukee Bucks	Austin Peay (Sr.)
7	120	Mike Stewart^{#}	C	United States	Boston Celtics	Santa Clara (Sr.)
8	121	Dave Langston^{#}	G	United States	Philadelphia 76ers	Drake (Sr.)
8	122	Carl Jackson^{#}	G	United States	Buffalo Braves	St. Bonaventure (Sr.)
8	123	Lindell Reason^{#}	G	United States	Portland Trail Blazers	Eastern Michigan (Sr.)
8	124	Wardell Jeffries^{#}	F	United States	Seattle SuperSonics	Oklahoma Baptist (Sr.)
8	125	John Ritter^{#}	F	United States	Cleveland Cavaliers	Indiana (Sr.)
8	126	John Thomas^{#}	F	United States	Houston Rockets	Missouri Southern (Sr.)
8	127	Mike Williams^{#}	G	United States	Kansas City–Omaha Kings	Kentucky Wesleyan (Sr.)
8	128	Jim Owens	F	United States	Phoenix Suns	Arizona State (Sr.)
8	129	Ben Kelso	G	United States	Detroit Pistons	Central Michigan (Sr.)
8	130	Tim Dominey^{#}	G	United States	Atlanta Hawks	Valdosta State (Sr.)
8	131	Jeff Dawson^{#}	G	United States	Golden State Warriors	Illinois (Jr.)
8	132	B. G. Brosterhous^{#}	F	United States	Chicago Bulls	Texas (Sr.)
8	133	Mark Jellison^{#}	G	United States	Capital Bullets	Northeastern (Sr.)
8	134	Steve Rowell^{#}	G	United States	New York Knicks	Rhode Island (Sr.)
8	135	Walt McGary^{#}	F	United States	Milwaukee Bucks	Chattanooga (Jr.)
8	136	Roy McPipe^{#}	G	United States	Los Angeles Lakers	Montana State Billings (Jr.)
8	137	Robert White^{#}	F	United States	Boston Celtics	Sam Houston (Sr.)
9	138	Harvey Catchings	C/F	United States	Philadelphia 76ers	Hardin–Simmons (Jr.)
9	139	Mike Contreras^{#}	G	United States	Portland Trail Blazers	Arizona State (Sr.)
9	140	Bob Fullarton^{#}	C	United States	Buffalo Braves	Xavier (Sr.)
9	141	Greg Williams^{#}	F	United States	Seattle SuperSonics	Seattle (Sr.)
9	142	Les Taylor^{#}	G	United States	Cleveland Cavaliers	Murray State (Sr.)
9	143	James Brown^{#}	G	United States	Kansas City–Omaha Kings	Dartmouth (Sr.)
9	144	Sandy Smith^{#}	G	United States	Phoenix Suns	Winston-Salem State (Sr.)
9	145	Bill Kilgore^{#}	F	United States	Detroit Pistons	Michigan State (Sr.)
9	146	Everett Fopma^{#}	F	United States	Golden State Warriors	Idaho State (Sr.)
9	147	Ruben Montanez^{#}	G	Puerto Rico	Chicago Bulls	Duquesne (Sr.)
9	148	Mike Boylan^{#}	F	United States	Capital Bullets	Assumption (Sr.)
9	149	Joe Wise^{#}	G	United States	New York Knicks	Bridgewater State (Sr.)
9	150	Bob Bocca^{#}	G	United States	Milwaukee Bucks	Quinnipiac (Sr.)
9	151	Corky Taylor^{#}	F	United States	Boston Celtics	Minnesota (Sr.)
10	152	Abe Steward^{#}	F	United States	Philadelphia 76ers	Jacksonville (Sr.)
10	153	Nick Connor^{#}	F	United States	Buffalo Braves	Illinois (Sr.)
10	154	Sam Whitehead^{#}	F	United States	Portland Trail Blazers	Oregon State (Sr.)
10	155	Bob Bodell^{#}	G	United States	Seattle SuperSonics	Maryland (Sr.)
10	156	Dean Martin^{#}	F	United States	Cleveland Cavaliers	Baldwin–Wallace (Sr.)
10	157	Ernie Kusnyer^{#}	F	United States	Kansas City–Omaha Kings	Kansas State (Sr.)
10	158	Claude White^{#}	G	United States	Phoenix Suns	Elmhurst (Sr.)
10	159	Bob Solomon^{#}	G	United States	Detroit Pistons	Wayne State College (Sr.)
10	160	Fred Lavaroni^{#}	F	United States	Golden State Warriors	Santa Clara (Sr.)
10	161	Russ Hunt^{#}	F	United States	Chicago Bulls	Furman (Sr.)
10	162	Dickie Kelly^{#}	G	United States	Capital Bullets	Bay CC (Fr.)
10	163	Ed Fields^{#}	F	United States	New York Knicks	LIU Post (Sr.)
10	164	Ron Battle^{#}	F	United States	Milwaukee Bucks	Sam Houston (Sr.)
10	165	Steve Turner^{#}	C	United States	Boston Celtics	Vanderbilt (Sr.)
11	166	Rod Freeman	F	United States	Philadelphia 76ers	Vanderbilt (Sr.)
11	167	Eddie Payne^{#}	G	United States	Portland Trail Blazers	Wake Forest (Sr.)
11	168	Mike Lee^{#}	G	United States	Buffalo Braves	Syracuse (Sr.)
11	169	Floyd Lewis^{#}	F	United States	Cleveland Cavaliers	Harvard (Sr.)
11	170	Lynn Greer^{#}	G	United States	Phoenix Suns	Virginia State (Sr.)
11	171	Len Paul^{#}	F	United States	Detroit Pistons	Akron (Sr.)
11	172	Dale Adams^{#}	F	United States	Capital Bullets	St. Mary's (Maryland) (Sr.)
11	173	Charles Edge^{#}	F	United States	New York Knicks	LeMoyne–Owen (Sr.)
11	174	Ed Hastings^{#}	G	United States	Boston Celtics	Villanova (Sr.)
12	175	Connie Warren^{#}	F	United States	Philadelphia 76ers	Xavier (Sr.)
12	176	Aaron Covington^{#}	G	United States	Buffalo Braves	Canisius (Sr.)
12	177	Rick Holdt^{#}	F	United States	Portland Trail Blazers	NC State (Sr.)
12	178	Chris McMurray^{#}	F	United States	Cleveland Cavaliers	San Diego State (Sr.)
12	179	Laymon Williamson^{#}	F	United States	Phoenix Suns	Samford (Sr.)
12	180	Clarence Carlisle^{#}	G	United States	Detroit Pistons	Ferris State (Sr.)
12	181	Mike Battle^{#}	F	United States	Capital Bullets	George Washington (Sr.)
12	182	Bruce Winkler^{#}	F	United States	Boston Celtics	Santa Clara (Sr.)
13	183	Jim Crawford^{#}	F	United States	Philadelphia 76ers	La Salle (Sr.)
13	184	Bob Vartanian^{#}	G	United States	Buffalo Braves	Buffalo (Sr.)
13	185	John Penebacker^{#}	G	United States	Cleveland Cavaliers	Hawaii (Sr.)
13	186	Kalevi Sarkalahti^{#}	F	Finland	Phoenix Suns	BYU (Sr.)
13	187	Chet Davis^{#}	G	United States	Capital Bullets	Morgan State (Sr.)
13	188	Scott Koelzer^{#}	F	United States	Boston Celtics	Montana State (Sr.)
14	189	Ernie Johnson^{#}	F	United States	Philadelphia 76ers	Michigan (Sr.)
14	190	Ron Gilliam^{#}	G	United States	Buffalo Braves	SUNY Brockport (Sr.)
14	191	Charles Mitchell^{#}	F	United States	Cleveland Cavaliers	Eastern Kentucky (Sr.)
14	192	Howard White^{#}	G	United States	Capital Bullets	Maryland (Sr.)
14	193	Rick Williams^{#}	G	United States	Boston Celtics	Iowa (Sr.)
15	194	Lionel Harris^{#}	G	United States	Philadelphia 76ers	Cincinnati (Sr.)
15	195	John Fraley^{#}	G	United States	Buffalo Braves	Georgia (Sr.)
15	196	Reese Stovall^{#}	F	United States	Cleveland Cavaliers	Pan American (Sr.)
15	197	Shorty Simmons^{#}	F	United States	Capital Bullets	St. Mary's (Maryland) (Sr.)
15	198	James Gilchrist^{#}	F	United States	Boston Celtics	Florida Southern (Sr.)
16	199	Larry Robinson^{#}	F	United States	Philadelphia 76ers	Tennessee (Sr.)
16	200	John Green^{#}	F	United States	Buffalo Braves	U.S. Armed Forces (AAU)
16	201	Tom O'Connor^{#}	C	United States	Cleveland Cavaliers	Iowa State (Sr.)
16	202	Sam Barber^{#}	F	United States	Boston Celtics	Bethune–Cookman (Sr.)
17	203	Tony Prince^{#}	F	United States	Philadelphia 76ers	St. John's (Sr.)
17	204	Jim Garvin	F	United States	Buffalo Braves	Boston University (Sr.)
17	205	Phil Elderkin^{#}	–	United States	Cleveland Cavaliers	–
17	206	Lamont King^{#}	G	United States	Boston Celtics	Long Beach State (Sr.)
18	207	Donn Johnston^{#}	F	United States	Buffalo Braves	North Carolina (Sr.)
18	208	Peter Gavett^{#}	F	United States	Boston Celtics	Maine (Sr.)
19	209	Ron Thorsen^{#}	G	United States	Buffalo Braves	UBC (Sr.)
19	210	Tom Austin^{#}	F	United States	Boston Celtics	UMass (Sr.)
20	211	Phil Tollestrup^{#}	F	Canada	Buffalo Braves	Lethbridge (Sr.)

== Notable undrafted players ==
These players were not selected in the 1973 draft but played at least one game in the NBA.

Player	Pos.	Nationality	School/club team
Al Carlson	C	United States	Oregon (Jr.)
Henry Dickerson	G	United States	Morris Harvey (Sr.)
Slick Watts	G	United States	Xavier (Louisiana) (Sr.)

== Trades ==
- ^{a 1} ^{2} On the draft-day, the Cleveland Cavaliers acquired a first-round pick and a third-round pick from the Portland Trail Blazers in exchange for John Johnson, Rick Roberson and Los Angeles Lakers' first-round pick. The Cavaliers used the picks to draft Jim Brewer and Jim O'Brien. The Blazers used the pick to draft Barry Parkhill.
- ^{b} On October 13, 1971, the Los Angeles Lakers acquired a 1973 first-round pick, 1972 and 1973 second-round picks from the Cleveland Cavaliers in exchange for Rick Roberson. The Lakers used the picks to draft Kermit Washington and Bill Schaeffer.
- ^{c} On April 13, 1973, the Atlanta Hawks acquired the ninth pick from the Detroit Pistons in exchange for George Trapp. The Hawks used the pick to draft Dwight Jones.
- ^{d} On October 18, 1971, the Capital Bullets (as the Baltimore Bullets) acquired a second-round pick and Archie Clark from the Philadelphia 76ers in exchange for Fred Carter and Kevin Loughery. The Bullets used the pick to draft Louie Nelson.
- ^{e} On November 9, 1972, the Kansas City-Omaha Kings acquired a second-round pick from the Detroit Pistons in exchange for John Mengelt. Previously, the Pistons acquired the pick on September 29, 1972, from the Buffalo Braves in exchange for Howard Komives. The Kings used the pick to draft Mike D'Antoni.
- ^{f} On July 31, 1972, the Philadelphia 76ers acquired a second-round pick from the Portland Trail Blazers in exchange for Fred Foster. The 76ers used the pick to draft Allan Bristow.
- ^{g} On April 18, 1973, the Philadelphia 76ers acquired a 1973 second-round pick from Seattle SuperSonics as a compensation when the Sonics signed John Brisker on August 15, 1972. The 76ers used the pick to draft George McGinnis.
- ^{h} On June 9, 1971, the Chicago Bulls acquired a second-round pick from the Houston Rockets in exchange for Dick Gibbs. The Bulls used the pick to draft Kevin Stacom.
- ^{i} On November 22, 1972, the Cleveland Cavaliers acquired a second-round pick from the Phoenix Suns in exchange for Walt Wesley. The Bulls used the pick to draft Allan Hornyak.
- ^{j} On October 31, 1972, the Atlanta Hawks acquired a second-round pick from the Detroit Pistons in exchange for Don Adams. The Hawks used the pick to draft Tom Ingelsby.
- ^{k} On October 9, 1972, the New York Knicks acquired a second-round pick from the Atlanta Hawks in exchange for Eddie Mast. The Bulls used the pick to draft Patrick McFarland.
- ^{l} On December 6, 1972, the Los Angeles Lakers acquired a second-round pick from the Capital Bullets (as the Baltimore Bullets) in exchange for Flynn Robinson and future considerations. The Lakers used the pick to draft Jim Chones.
- ^{m} On October 18, 1972, the Philadelphia 76ers acquired a second-round pick from the Chicago Bulls in exchange for Dennis Awtrey. Previously, the Bulls acquired the pick on December 10, 1971, from the New York Knicks in exchange for Charlie Paulk. The 76ers used the pick to draft Caldwell Jones.
- ^{n} On October 10, 1972, the Phoenix Suns acquired a second-round pick from the Philadelphia 76ers in exchange for Mel Counts. Previously, the 76ers acquired the pick on the same day from the Milwaukee Bucks in exchange for Gary Gregor. The Suns used the pick to draft Gary Melchionni.
- ^{o} On January 26, 1973, the Atlanta Hawks acquired a third-round pick from the Philadelphia 76ers in exchange for Jeff Halliburton. The Hawks used the pick to draft Ted Manakas.
- ^{p} On December 27, 1971, the Phoenix Suns acquired a third-round pick from the Kansas City-Omaha Kings (as the Cincinnati Royals) in exchange for Fred Taylor. The Suns used the pick to draft Joe Reaves.
- ^{q} The Detroit Pistons acquired a third-round pick from the Los Angeles Lakers as part of the 1969 trade for Happy Hairston.
- ^{r} On December 9, 1971, the Houston Rockets acquired a third-round pick and Greg Smith from the Milwaukee Bucks in exchange for a 1972 first-round pick and Curtis Perry. The Rockets used the pick to draft E. C. Coleman.

== Early entrants ==
=== College underclassmen ===
For the third year in a row, the NBA would implement the hardship exception for college underclassmen following the results of the 1971 NBA draft's event. Originally, twelve college underclassmen signed up for this year's event, but the University of Maryland's Len Elmore, Southern California Community College's Mallory Mitchell, and St. John's Ed Searcy would all later decline their entries into this draft. In addition to them, one of the ABA's players in David Brent from the Carolina Cougars (previously last played for Jacksonville University) would also declare his entry into this NBA draft, with him later being selected by the Los Angeles Lakers this year in the sixth round. The following college basketball players successfully applied for an NBA hardship.

- (United States) Bird Averitt – G, Pepperdine (junior)
- (United States) Larry Harris – F, Genesee Community College (sophomore)
- (United States) Dwight Jones – Houston (junior)
- (United States) Larry Kenon – F, Memphis (junior)
- (United States) Raymond Lewis – G, Cal State Los Angeles (sophomore)
- (United States) Arnold Mast – G, Southwestern Bible College (freshman)
- (United States) Larry McNeill – F, Marquette (junior)
- (United States) John Williamson – G, New Mexico State (junior)

== Notes ==
1: NBA commissioner Walter Kennedy originally awarded Seattle SuperSonics's fourth overall pick in the first round to the Philadelphia 76ers in compensation for John Brisker, who signed with the Sonics despite being on Philadelphia's negotiation list. However, the federal court invalidated Kennedy's decision, ruling that only the NBA Board of Governors had the power to do so. Subsequently, the Board decided to award the 76ers with an extra first-round draft pick and the Sonics' second-round pick as compensations. The Sonics maintained possession of the fourth pick. In addition, the date of the draft, which was originally scheduled for April 16, was postponed to April 24.
2: Mike D'Antoni was born in the United States, but he has represented the Italian national team.

== See also ==
- List of first overall NBA draft picks
