= Henry Dickerson =

American basketball coach (1951–2023)

Personal information
- Born: November 27, 1951 Beckley, West Virginia, U.S.
- Died: August 10, 2023 (aged 71)
- Listed height: 6 ft 4 in (1.93 m)
- Listed weight: 190 lb (86 kg)

Career information
- High school: Woodrow Wilson (Beckley, West Virginia)
- College: Charleston (1969–1973)
- NBA draft: 1973: undrafted
- Playing career: 1975–1978
- Position: Point guard / shooting guard
- Number: 22, 13
- Coaching career: 1978–2013

Career history

Playing
- 1975: Israel Sabras
- 1976: Detroit Pistons
- 1976–1977: Syracuse Centennials
- 1977: Atlanta Hawks
- 1977–1978: Allentown Jets

Coaching
- 1978–1979: Maury HS (assistant)
- 1979–1983: Charleston (assistant)
- 1983–1989: Marshall (assistant)
- 1989–1997: Chattanooga (associate HC)
- 1997–2002: Chattanooga
- 2004–2009: North Carolina Central
- 2011–2013: Johnston CC

Career highlights
- All-EBA Second Team (1977)
- Stats at NBA.com
- Stats at Basketball Reference

Henry Preston Dickerson (November 27, 1951 – August 10, 2023) was an American professional basketball player and college basketball coach. He was the head coach of the men's basketball team at North Carolina Central University from 2004 to 2009. He led the Eagles through their first two seasons of NCAA Division I competition in 2007–09. He was born in Beckley, West Virginia.

== College playing career ==
A 6-foot-4-inch (1.93 m), 190-pound (86 kg) guard, Dickerson played at the University of Charleston in West Virginia from 1969 to 1973. As an NAIA All-American, Dickerson averaged 16 points and 12 rebounds during his four-year collegiate career from 1969 to 1973, and is still the only person in the history of the conference to be named First Team All-Conference and Conference All-Tournament for four consecutive seasons.

== Professional playing career ==
After his collegiate career ended, Dickerson tried out for the Carolina Cougars and Virginia Squires of the American Basketball Association but was released by both teams. He moved to Grand Rapids, Michigan, where his sister worked and wanted to play for the Grand Rapids Tackers was not offered a tryout. Dickerson stayed in Grand Rapids and worked as a substitute teacher for Grand Rapids Public Schools while playing in local games. In 1975, Dickerson was contacted by Herb Brown who remembered him from the Cougars rookie camp and invited him to play in the European Professional Basketball League.

Dickerson returned to the United States after spending the 1975 season in Israel and failed a second tryout with the Squires in the ABA. During the middle of the 1975–76 season, Dickerson was contacted by Brown who was now the head coach of the Detroit Pistons in the National Basketball Association (NBA) and offered to join the team.

From 1975 to 1977, Dickerson played in the National Basketball Association as a member of the Detroit Pistons and Atlanta Hawks. Before signing with the Hawks late in the 1976–77 season, Dickerson played in the Eastern Basketball Association for the Syracuse Centennials, averaging 27.1 points per game for the team. He was selected to the All-EBA Second Team.

== Coaching career ==
=== University of Tennessee at Chattanooga ===
Dickerson was head coach at the University of Tennessee at Chattanooga from 1997 to 2002. Dickerson served as the associate head coach at UTC from 1989 to 1997 and helped lead those teams to six Southern Conference regular season titles, four conference tournament championships and four NCAA tournament appearances, including a visit to the "Sweet 16" in 1997 as a #14 seed.

=== North Carolina Central University ===
In his first season at NCCU, the 2004–05 Eagles finished with a 16–12 overall record and advanced to the quarterfinals of the CIAA Tournament. He led his squad to three victories over teams that played in the NCAA tournament, including road wins over Catawba and Bowie State, and a home win over the eventual NCAA Division II national champions Virginia Union.

In 2005–06, NCCU posted a 10–18 record with a nucleus of newcomers against a schedule that included seven opponents coming off NCAA Tournament appearances and an extra non-conference game against the defending NCAA Division II national champions. Among the 10 victories was a 43-point blowout of Columbus State University, a team that finished with a 23–9 record and advanced to the NCAA Regional semifinals.

In 2006–07, the Eagles finished their final season in the NCAA Division II ranks with a record of 13–15. NCCU defeated four ranked opponents, including the eventual NCAA Division II national champions, Barton College (Nov. 18, 2006). That victory marked the second time in the previous three seasons that the Eagles beat the eventual national title winner.

=== Johnston Community College ===
In 2011, Dickerson became the head coach at Johnston Community College.

== Death ==
Dickerson died on August 10, 2023, at the age of 71.

== Career statistics ==
Legend
| GP | Games played | GS | Games started | MPG | Minutes per game |
| FG% | Field goal percentage | 3P% | 3-point field goal percentage | FT% | Free throw percentage |
| RPG | Rebounds per game | APG | Assists per game | SPG | Steals per game |
| BPG | Blocks per game | PPG | Points per game | **Bold** | Career high |

=== NBA ===
==== Regular season ====
| Year | Team | GP | MPG | FG% | FT% | RPG | APG | SPG | BPG | PPG |
|---|---|---|---|---|---|---|---|---|---|---|
| 1975–76 | Detroit | **17** | 6.6 | .310 | **.625** | .2 | .5 | .1 | **.1** | 1.6 |
| 1976–77 | Atlanta | 6 | **10.5** | **.500** | **.625** | **.3** | **1.8** | **.2** | .0 | **2.8** |
| Career | | 23 | 7.6 | .366 | .625 | .2 | .8 | .1 | .0 | 2.0 |

==== Playoffs ====
| Year | Team | GP | MPG | FG% | FT% | RPG | APG | SPG | BPG | PPG |
|---|---|---|---|---|---|---|---|---|---|---|
| 1976 | Detroit | 5 | 3.0 | .444 | .500 | .8 | .6 | .2 | .0 | 1.8 |
