= Roy Rubin (basketball) =

American basketball coach (1925–2013)

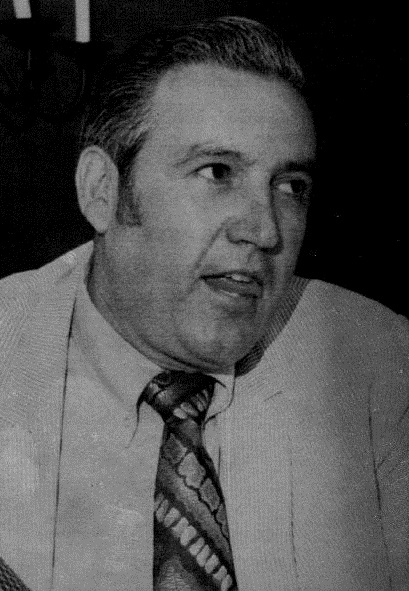
- Rubin in 1972

Biographical details
- Born: December 9, 1925; The Bronx, New York, U.S.
- Died: August 5, 2013 (aged 87); Miami, Florida, U.S.

Playing career
- 1950–1951: Louisville
- Position: Guard

Coaching career (HC unless noted)
- 1961–1972: Long Island
- 1972–1973: Philadelphia 76ers

Head coaching record
- Overall: Long Island: 174–94 (.649); NBA: 4–47 (.078)

Roy Rubin (December 9, 1925 – August 5, 2013) was a former college and professional basketball coach.

== Career as coach ==
Rubin played college basketball while attending University of Louisville from 1949 to 1951. He coached the 1972–73 Philadelphia 76ers — at the time, the worst team (a 9–73 win–loss record) in the history of the NBA — for the first 51 games of the season. His record was 4–47.

Rubin coached at Christopher Columbus High School in New York City, where he led the team to six borough championships in the Public Schools Athletic League in nine seasons. He was known as a defensive genius, and had even written a book on how to play defense. He was the athletic director and head basketball coach at Long Island University (LIU), compiling a 174–94 record in eleven seasons.

=== Philadelphia 76ers ===
Rubin left his positions at LIU to sign a three‐year contract to head coach the Philadelphia 76ers on June 15, 1972. He succeeded Jack Ramsay who had resigned three months earlier after the ballclub finished third in the Atlantic Division at 30–52 and missed the playoffs for the first time in franchise history (dating to their time as the Syracuse Nationals from 1946 to 1963). The 76ers were only six years removed from winning an NBA title with the most wins in league history at the time, but had fallen so far that Al McGuire and Adolph Rupp had declined offers to take over the team. The Sixers were so desperate to find a coach that they actually took out an ad in The Philadelphia Inquirer, which was seen by one of Rubin's friends, stockbroker Jules Love.

Rubin joined a team whose only holdover from its championship run six seasons earlier was aging veteran Hal Greer. Rubin's introductory press conference occurred almost simultaneous to the ones held in Charlotte and Greensboro, North Carolina in which Billy Cunningham announced that he was going to play with the American Basketball Association's Carolina Cougars beginning with the upcoming season. An 0–15 start started a watch of just how bad the team could get. It took him a month to get a win, and he would only win three more times after that. After 51 games and a 4–47 record—and while in the midst of what would become a (then)-record 20-game losing streak—Rubin was fired in favor of player-coach Kevin Loughery on January 23, 1973. However, according to ESPN, Rubin had lost the team before then; the players reportedly considered Loughery their on-court leader as early as Christmas.

Several players on the team believed that Rubin was in over his head as an NBA head coach. They claimed he ran sloppy practices and never said anything meaningful during timeouts, halftime or postgame meetings. For example, he suggested that all the players needed to do to get ready for the season was run full-court, one-on-one games for 48 minutes. Years later, one of the players on that team, Fred Carter, said that letting Rubin coach the Sixers was "like letting a teenager run a big corporation." Later, Carter told ESPN that he concluded Rubin wasn't cut out to be an NBA head coach when he was in high spirits after a preseason win over the Eastern Conference finalist Boston Celtics even though the Celtics had mostly played their third stringers.

== Tough to Get Help ==
A month prior to signing with the 76ers, Rubin was one of the producers of the Broadway comedy Tough to Get Help. It was written by Steve Gordon, directed by Carl Reiner, starred John Amos and Dick O'Neill and also featured Abe Vigoda. The comedy was about a black couple who worked as a gardener (Amos) and a cook (Lillian Hayman) for a white liberal advertising executive (O'Neill) and his wife (Billie Lou Watt) and the homecoming of their militant son (John Danelle).

Its reviews were unfavorable. The only criticism from Clive Barnes of The New York Times was directed at Gordon. He explained, "...The play, with interminable and unfunny dream sequences, with dialogue that seems to have been picked up wholesale from a TV situation comedy and characters of no real comic depth or perception, does not have a great deal going for it." His critique was published the day after the comedy opened and closed with only one performance at the Royale Theatre on May 4, 1972.

== Later life ==
Rubin moved to Florida, eventually owned an International House of Pancakes restaurant, and never coached another game of basketball. He died of cancer in Miami in 2013. He was survived by his wife, Marsha.

== Head coaching record ==
=== NBA ===
Team	Year	G	W	L	W–L%	Finish	PG	PW	PL	PW–L%	Result
Philadelphia	1972–73	51	4	47	.078	(fired)	—	—	—	—	Missed playoffs
Career		51	4	47	.078		0	0	0	–	
