= Kevin Loughery =

American basketball player and coach (born 1940)

Personal information
- Born: March 28, 1940 (age 86) Brooklyn, New York, U.S.
- Listed height: 6 ft 3 in (1.91 m)
- Listed weight: 190 lb (86 kg)

Career information
- High school: Cardinal Hayes (The Bronx, New York)
- College: Boston College (1958–1959); St. John's (1960–1962)
- NBA draft: 1962: 2nd round, 11th overall pick
- Drafted by: Detroit Pistons
- Playing career: 1962–1973
- Position: Point guard / shooting guard
- Number: 21, 52, 22

Career history

Playing
- 1962–1963: Detroit Pistons
- 1963–1971: Baltimore Bullets
- 1971–1973: Philadelphia 76ers

Coaching
- 1973: Philadelphia 76ers
- 1973–1980: New York / New Jersey Nets
- 1981–1983: Atlanta Hawks
- 1983–1985: Chicago Bulls
- 1986–1988: Washington Bullets
- 1992–1994: Miami Heat

Career highlights
- As coach: 2× ABA champion (1974, 1976); 2× ABA All-Star Game head coach (1975, 1976)

Career playing statistics
- Points: 11,575 (15.3 ppg)
- Rebounds: 2,254 (3.0 rpg)
- Assists: 2,803 (3.7 apg)
- Stats at NBA.com
- Stats at Basketball Reference

Career coaching record
- ABA & NBA: 642–746 (.463)
- Record at Basketball Reference

Kevin Michael "Murph" Loughery (born March 28, 1940) is an American former professional basketball player and coach. He played for 11 seasons in the National Basketball Association (NBA) for the Detroit Pistons, Baltimore Bullets, and Philadelphia 76ers. He was a head coach in the NBA and American Basketball Association (ABA) for 20 years. Loughery coached both Julius Erving and Michael Jordan; and gave Phil Jackson his first NBA coaching job, as an assistant coach with the New Jersey Nets.

Loughery won the ABA championship twice as head coach of the New York Nets. He led five different teams to the NBA playoffs; the New Jersey Nets, Atlanta Hawks, Chicago Bulls, Washington Bullets, and the Miami Heat. He is among the head coaches who have received the most technical fouls in NBA history, and his practice of going up and down the sideline from baseline to baseline led to the NBA enacting a rule that more closely tethered a coach to their own bench.

== Early life ==
Loughery was born on March 28, 1940, in Brooklyn, New York. His father was a police detective. He attended Cardinal Hayes High School in The Bronx, graduating in 1957. In his senior year, Loughery was an All-City player at Cardinal Hayes, and most valuable player in the Bronx Catholic high school tournament, which his team won.

== College basketball ==
Loughery originally attended Boston College (BC), playing one year of college basketball for the Eagles (1958–59), where he averaged 16.8 points and 8.9 rebounds in 19 games. He grew homesick, however, and transferred to St. John's University, playing basketball there for two seasons (1960–62). At St. John's he played under coach Joe Lapchick, who would be inducted into the Naismith Memorial Basketball Hall of Fame in 1966. Before accepting Loughery, Lapchick called BC coach Dino Martin to see if he was agreeable to the transfer, and Martin confirmed Loughery was a good and cooperative boy who was simply anxious to come home.

During his two years at St. John's, the team was 41–10. Loughery averaged 10.6 points and 4.6 rebounds per game in 25 games in the 1960–61 season. St. John's was 20–5 and won the Metropolitan New York Conference championship. His teammates included LeRoy Ellis, with whom he would play in the National Basketball Association (NBA) for the Baltimore Bullets.

Loughery averaged 15.5 points and 5.8 rebounds per game as a senior (1961–62). St. John's was 21–5 that season, and again first in the Metropolitan New York Conference. In the 1961–62 season, Ellis led the Metropolitan New York Conference in scoring and rebounding, and Loughery ranked seventh in points per game. St. John's was invited to play in the 1962 National Invitation Tournament (NIT), and reached the championship game against Dayton. St. John's defeated Holy Cross in the first round, 80–74; Loughery scoring 14 points. St. John's defeated Duquesne in the second round, 75–65; Loughery scoring 18 points. They lost to Dayton 73–67 in the championship game. Loughery led St. John's with 26 points in that game.

== Professional career ==
Loughery's nickname during his playing and coaching days was "Murph".

=== Detroit Pistons and Baltimore Bullets ===
The Detroit Pistons selected Loughery in the second round of the 1962 NBA draft (13th overall). Loughery spent 11 seasons in the NBA (1962–1973), playing for the Pistons, the Baltimore Bullets, and the Philadelphia 76ers, almost nine of them with the Bullets. After spending 1962–63 with the Pistons, Detroit traded him early in the 1963-64 season to the Bullets for Larry Staverman. As a rookie in Detroit, he averaged less than 15 minutes a game, with a scoring average below seven points. He played in only one game for the Pistons the following season before the trade.

Loughery credits former Bullets and Naismith Hall of Fame coach Bobby "Slick" Leonard with giving Loughery a chance to prove himself in the NBA. After going to the Bullets early in the 1963–64 season, Loughery played in 65 games. He was a reserve shooting guard behind Rod Thorn. Loughery averaged 22.4 minutes, 9.2 points, and 2.8 assists per game for the Bullets that season. The Bullets and Pistons made a multiplayer trade before the 1964–65 season, that involved among other players Thorn going to Detroit and guard Don Ohl coming to Baltimore. Loughery became the starting point guard next to Ohl that season. Loughery played in all 80 games, averaging 30.2 minutes, 12.8 points, 3.7 assists, and 2.9 rebounds per game.

In the first round of the 1965 NBA playoffs against the St. Louis Hawks, he averaged 21.8 points, 5.3 rebounds, and four assists; playing 37 minutes per game. He led the Bullets in assists and was second only to Ohl's 22 points per game in scoring. The Bullets then lost to the Los Angeles Lakers in six games in the Western Division finals. Loughery split time at point guard with Wali Jones during that series, averaging 8.8 points and 2.3 assists per game. The Bullets' strategy in alternating both Loughery and Jones during a game was to increase the defensive pressure on the Lakers future Hall of Fame guard Jerry West. This was unsuccessful as West averaged 46.3 points per game in the series.

Loughery started at guard for the Bullets with Ohl again in 1965–66, playing in 74 games. He averaged 33.2 minutes, 18.2 points, 4.8 assists, and 3.1 rebounds per game. The Bullets lost in three games to the St. Louis Hawks in the first round of the 1966 NBA playoffs. Loughery was injured and of limited availability during that series, averaging only nine minutes and three points per game. In 1966–67, he averaged nearly 34 minutes per game over 76 games. He once again averaged 18.2 points per game, playing alongside Ohl.

The following season (1967–68) the nearly 32-year old Ohl was the oldest player on a team with a number of other capable younger guards, and the Bullets traded him to the Hawks in January 1968. More importantly for Loughery and the Bullets, future Hall of Fame guard Earl Monroe joined the Bullets in 1967–68. Monroe averaged nearly 37 minutes and 24.3 points per game, in being named the NBA's Rookie of the Year. Loughery played in 77 games, averaging nearly 30 minutes and 16 points per game that season.

Loughery's best scoring seasons came in 1968–69 (22.6) and 1969–70 (21.9), teaming in Baltimore's backcourt with Monroe. These two Bullets' teams also included Hall of Famers Wes Unseld and Gus Johnson. In 1968–69, Loughery was second on the team to Monroe in scoring and assists (4.8 per game), and 11th in the NBA in scoring average. Unseld was both the NBA Most Valuable Player and Rookie of the Year that season, and the Bullets had a 57–25 record, finishing first in the NBA's Eastern Division. However, Bullets' All-Star forward Gus Johnson, who had been averaging 17.9 points and 11.6 rebounds per game had left knee surgery in February of 1969, and did not play the rest of the season. The Bullets were swept in the first round of the playoffs by the New York Knicks. Loughery averaged 43.3 minutes and 5.3 assists per game in that series, the most of any Bullets' player. He averaged 20.3 points per game (second to Monroe's 28.3) and 4.5 rebounds per game.

In the 1969–70 season, Loughery's 21.9 points per game was again second to Monroe on the Bullets, and Loughery led the team with 5.3 assists per game. He averaged 37 minutes per game, but played in only 55 games. Loughery suffered torn tendons during a November 18 game against the San Diego Rockets and did not play again until December 17. In a game against the Milwaukee Bucks on February 25, 1970, Loughery received a knee to the chest from Bucks' center Kareem Abdul-Jabbar (then known as Lew Alcindor). Loughery was hospitalized in Milwaukee, and then in Baltimore, with four fractured ribs and punctured lung, and did not play during the remainder of the regular season.

The Bullets played the New York Knicks again in the Eastern Division semifinals, during the 1970 NBA playoffs; losing in seven games to the eventual 1970 NBA champions. Loughery played in all seven games despite his significant injuries. He initially wore a steel jacket/metal corset to protect his ribs and lung. Loughery played 23 minutes with seven points in Game 1 and 21 minutes with five points in Game 2.

After losing the first two games in the series, Loughery helped lead the Bullets to a Game 3 win, 127–113. Between the first and second quarters of Game 3, Monroe helped Loughery remove the metal corset. Bullets coach Gene Shue was concerned about the risk to Loughery, but left the decision up to Loughery. Loughery scored 17 points in 19 minutes in that game; including the last seven points in the third quarter to give the Bullets a 10-point lead, and then six more to start the fourth quarter. Knicks coach Red Holzman later said the Knicks were not prepared for that kind of offensive performance from Loughery. Loughery said "Getting rid of the harness was the difference". He had been fearful in driving for a layup, as to what might happen, but after his first layup he gained confidence.

Loughery had 16 points in 28 minutes in a Game 5 loss, and 11 points in 25 minutes in Game 7. Holzman later said "I had to admire Loughery. He had discarded his protective brace and took a great risk to play at all. He had a visible scar on his chest where they had gone in to repair a punctured lung. He could have punctured it again but played anyway".

Loughery played in all 82 games for the Bullets in their 1970–71 season. He averaged 27.6 minutes per game; with reserve guards Eddie Miles and Fred Carter both averaging over 22 minutes per game; Monroe averaging over 35 minutes per game. Loughery averaged 15.1 points and 3.7 assists per game that season. The Bullets defeated the Philadelphia 76ers in the first round of the 1971 NBA playoffs, in seven games. Loughery averaged 34.9 minutes, 19.6 points, and five assists per game. He led the Bullets with 27 points in their Game 2 win; had 21 points in a Game 3. win.

Loughery was slowed by a bruised heel in the ensuing Eastern Division Finals against the Knicks, which the Bullets won in seven games. Gus Johnson was also injured during that series. Loughery missed one game entirely; and averaged only 23.2 minutes and 8.3 points per game in the other six games; and Johnson only played in parts of two games. Fred Carter stepped in as the starting guard next to Monroe and averaged 40.3 minutes, 16.7 points, 6.4 rebounds, and two assists per game against the Knicks; and hit the series clinching shot near the end of Game 7. The Bullets were swept by the Milwaukee Bucks in four games in the 1971 NBA Finals. Loughery played in all four games and averaged 29.3 minutes and 11.3 points per game.

Two games into the 1971–72 season, on October 17, 1971, the Bullets traded Loughery and Carter to the Philadelphia 76ers for Archie Clark, a 1973 second-round selection (19th overall–Louie Nelson), and cash.

From 1963 to 1972, Loughery played in 591 regular season games for the Bullets. He averaged 31.6 minutes, 16.6 points, four assists, and 3.1 rebounds per game; with 9,833 points and 2,363 assists. In 41 playoff games for Baltimore, he averaged 28 minutes, 12.9 points, 2.7 assists, and 2.6 rebounds per game. He is sixth all-time in franchise history in games played and total points (through 2025–26).

=== Philadelphia 76ers ===
Loughery appeared in 74 games in the 1971–72 season for the 76ers, starting 29. He averaged 23.4 minutes and 12.6 points per game. The following season, Loughery's last as a player, he appeared in 32 games for the 76ers, starting 21. He averaged 13.9 points, 4.6 assists, and 3.5 rebounds per game. Loughery had a knee injury that limited his player time during that season. The 1972–73 Philadelphia 76ers team has the worst 82-game season win–loss record in NBA history, 9–73 (.110).

Loughery's head coaching career began when he replaced Roy Rubin as the 76ers' head coach on January 23, 1973. The team 4–47 at the time (.078). At the time, the 32-year old Loughery reportedly received a player-coach contract that was said to include terms for him to continue as the 76ers coach for two more years beyond the balance of the 1972–73 season. The team slightly improved under Loughery, posting a 5–26 record (.161) for the remainder of the season; but 76ers management believed Loughery had done a good job and wanted to continue with him as coach into the following seasons.

Loughery said after the season ended that he only had his written player contract, even while coaching; that he and the 76ers did not have a separate signed contract for him being a coach; and there was no agreement for coaching the 76ers another two years. Loughery also had a dispute with 76ers general manager Don DeJardin over who to choose as the team's top draft pick in the 1973 NBA draft (DeJardin selecting guard Doug Collins when Loughery wanted Minnesota power forward Jim Brewer, believing the 76ers needed front line players). In late April 1973, Loughery signed a contract to coach the New York Nets in the rival American Basketball Association (ABA). The 76ers' ownership made clear that while they disagreed with Loughery about the existence of a contract, they would not attempt to block Loughery from joining the Nets. He was eventually replaced as the 76ers head coach by his former Bullets' coach Gene Shue, on June 15, 1973.

== Coaching career ==
=== New York/New Jersey Nets and Julius Erving ===
Loughery effectively retired as an active player when he accepted a five‐year contract as head coach of the ABA's New York Nets on April 26, 1973, succeeding Lou Carnesecca who had elected to return to St. John's University as its head coach and assistant athletic director. Loughery's salary was greater than the $80,000 he was receiving under his player contract with the 76ers. Loughery said at the time "'This has got to be one of the best jobs in pro basketball'".

The 1972–73 Nets had a 30–54 record, and were fourth in the ABA's Eastern Division. In early August 1973, the Nets acquired the rights to future Hall of Fame forward Julius "Dr. J." Erving. Under Loughery and behind Dr. J. in their first Nets' season (1973–74), the Nets had a 55–29 record and went on to win the 1974 ABA championship; with Erving named the league's Most Valuable Player (MVP) that season. The Nets were 58–26 the following season, but lost in the Eastern Division semifinals; though Erving was selected as league MVP for a second consecutive season. The 1975–76 Nets were 55–29, and won the ABA championship for the second time in three years; with Erving being named the ABA MVP for a third consecutive season. Loughery later said that Erving's performance against Denver in the second ABA championship series the Nets won was the best he had seen any basketball player ever play.

The ABA ceased to exist as a distinct entity after the 1975–76 season, with four of its teams joining the NBA. This included the Nets franchise. Erving held out before the 1976–77 season, and the Nets sold his rights to the Philadelphia 76ers. The Nets finished their inaugural season in the NBA, 22–60; the league's worst record. The Nets moved to New Jersey the following season, becoming the New Jersey Nets; finishing the season with a 24–58 record in Loughery's fifth season with the franchise. The Nets were considered weak financially as a franchise, and weak on talent with its players during those seasons. Loughery was called volatile and said to frequently harass the referees during games. He received 29 technical fouls in the 1977–78 season, and would walk up and down the sidelines from baseline to baseline during games (leading the NBA to create a new rule requiring the coaches to stay near their own bench).

In his sixth season coaching the Nets (1978–79), the team improved to 37–45, and reached the NBA playoffs for the first time; losing in the first round. In the 1978–79 season, Loughery gave current Nets player and future Hall of Fame coach Phil Jackson his first job as an assistant coach; while Jackson was finishing out his playing career with the Nets.The Nets were 34–48 the following season (1979–80); Jackson again serving as Loughery's assistant player-coach. Loughery was fired midway through the 1980–81 season and replaced by Bob MacKinnon. It has also been reported that Loughery resigned over broad differences in philosophy with the owner. MacKinnon was considered an interim head coach.

In three seasons with the Nets in the ABA, Loughery had a 164–84 win–loss record (.667), and a 21–11 playoff record (.656). He had the eighth most coaching wins in the ABA’s history. In a little over four seasons in the NBA with the Nets, his record was 129–234 (.355), with two playoff losses.

=== Atlanta Hawks ===
Loughery was hired by the Atlanta Hawks to replace Hubie Brown the very next season (1981–82). Loughery retained Mike Fratello as a Hawks' assistant coach that season. The Hawks were 42–40 during the 1981–82 season, and reached the first round of the NBA playoffs. The following season, on a team that included rookie Dominique Wilkins, the Hawks were 43–39. They again reached the first round of the NBA playoffs. Loughery left the Hawks to sign a three-year contract with the Chicago Bulls in June 1983, and was replaced by Fratello (who had become an assistant coach with the 1982–83 New York Knicks).

=== Chicago Bulls and Michael Jordan ===
The next two seasons, Loughery coached the Chicago Bulls. The Bulls were 27–55 in Loughery's first season with the team. In his second season, with rookie Michael Jordan on the team, the Bulls were 38–44, and reached the first round of the 1985 NBA playoffs.

Jordan is considered by many to be the greatest player in NBA history. In a 1992 interview with Playboy magazine, Jordan described Loughery's important role in Jordan's success:

"He gave me the confidence to play on his level. My first year, he threw me the ball and said, ‘Hey, kid, I know you can play. Go play,'" Jordan said. “I don’t think that would have been the case going through another coach’s system. Look what Loughery’s doing right now with Miami. He’s doing exactly what he did to me. He’s giving those guys so much confidence; he’s giving them an opportunity to create their own identity as players. With other coaches, you have to fit into their systems".

Jordan said he appreciated Loughery's straightforward honesty with his players, and that Loughery treated Jordan like a friend. In the book The Jordan Rules, Jordan was quoted as saying that Loughery was the most fun coach he ever played for and that Loughery allowed him to free-lance and play the style he wanted.

In March 1985, Jerry Reinsdorf led a group that purchased the Bulls, and he became chairman of the Bulls. Reinsdorf made Jerry Krause vice president of basketball operations. They removed Rod Thorn as the Bulls general manager before the end of March. At the end of May after the playoffs had ended, Krause conferred with Reinsdorf about Loughery's future with the Bulls, and they agreed to fire Loughery and his assistant coaches Bill Blair and Fred Carter. Krause stated to Loughery and publicly that this was because of "philosophical differences" with Loughery. Loughery said he was not sure what was meant by philosophical differences. He added "'This is the first time I've ever been fired. I'm sad about it but I'm not going to blow my brains out . . . I came in with the team and organization floundering and we made the playoffs and doubled attendance. There was some definite progress'".

=== Washington Bullets ===
Loughery went to the Washington Bullets the next season (1985–86) as an assistant coach to Gene Shue. The Bullets fired Shue on March 19, 1986, with a 32–37 record; and made Loughery head coach with 13 games left in the regular season. The team finished the season 7–6 under Loughery, and made it to the first round of the 1986 NBA playoffs, losing three games to two against the Philadelphia 76ers. The Bullets were 42–40 under Loughery during the 1986–87 season, and made it to the first round of the playoffs again; losing to the Detroit Pistons in three games. The Bullets began the 1987–88 season with an 8–19 record and were on a five-game losing streak when Loughery was dismissed and replaced by Bullets' assistant coach and vice president Wes Unseld, on January 3, 1988.

=== Miami Heat ===
After working in broadcasting part-time work for TBS and TNT; and serving as an assistant coach to Bob Weiss and the 1990–91 Atlanta Hawks, Loughery was hired by the Miami Heat as the second head coach in team history; going into the Heat's fourth NBA season after joining the NBA in 1988–89. The Hawks were successful in keeping Loughery from joining the Heat until after the 1991 NBA draft took place, considering him an important part of their draft selection decision making group. One of the Heat owners was Billy Cunningham, who had been Loughery's teammate with the Philadelphia 76ers.

The Heat were 24–58 the season before Loughery became head coach. In his first season as the Heat's head coach, the Heat were 38–44 and reach the first round of the 1992 NBA playoffs, losing to the Bulls and Michael Jordan in three games. This was the Heat's first appearance in the NBA playoffs. The Heat were 36–46 in the 1992–93 season. The Heat's record was over .500 for the first time in team history in the 1993–94 season, 42–40. They lost to the Atlanta Hawks three games to two in the first round of the 1994 NBA playoffs. The Heat got new ownership in mid-February 1995, and Loughery was fired one day later; replaced by Alvin Gentry. The Heat had a 17–29 record at the time. Loughery was offered a position as vice president for player personnel.

Exclusive of games coached in the ABA, Loughery is 28th all-time in NBA history in the number of regular season games coached (1,136). His overall NBA regular season record was 474–662.

== Legacy and honors ==
Naismith Hall of Fame coach Larry Brown once said the real key to Loughery's success as a coach was that he showed his players appreciation for the sacrifices they made as players. As a coach, Loughery was also known for his animated interactions with the referees, and receiving technical fouls. As of 2000, Loughery had the second most technical fouls in NBA history.

Loughery was physically tough. During a game while playing for the Bullets, Warriors Hall of Fame guard Guy Rodgers punched Loughery with such force that it caused a bridge to fly out of Loughery's mouth. Loughery once played in a playoff series while recovering from four broken ribs and a punctured lung, initially wearing a steel jacket for protection.

As the Nets coach, Loughery was once given three technical fouls in a game by referee Richie Powers, contrary to NBA rules which only allowed for two. Powers also gave player Bernard King three technical fouls. The game was between the 76ers and the Nets, with Loughery coaching the Nets. After a successful protest, the game was replayed months later, from the point in time the technical fouls were assessed. Powers was given a multi-game suspension. In the interim, there had been a trade between the 76ers and the Nets involving Eric Money, who had earlier played and scored for the Nets, and then later scored in the same (continued) game as a 76er.

During the same season, Loughery had been suspended three games for physical contact with a referee, but had won the admiration of his players and owner throughout the year in leading a team that had been on the verge of bankruptcy.

In 1997, Loughery was inducted into the New York City Basketball Hall of Fame.

== Broadcasting career ==
Loughery was a longtime on-and-off broadcaster and color commentator for CBS Sports' coverage of the NBA throughout the '80s, calling regular season and late playoff games. Among other things, Loughery worked with Dick Stockton during the 1981 NBA playoffs; Loughery and Hubie Brown worked as halftime analysts during the 1982 NBA Finals; and he worked with Brent Musburger in covering the 1983 NBA playoffs and 1984 NBA playoffs for CBS. He worked again at CBS in 1990.

After being fired as Washington's coach in January 1988, Loughery worked in broadcasting again, doing part-time work for TBS and TNT. He also broadcast Continental Basketball Association games for ESPN during the 1987 to 1989 seasons.

After his stint coaching the Heat, Loughery went back into broadcasting, first working with CNN/SI until 2002 when they folded. Loughery, who at times contributed as a guest for ESPN Radio, then joined ESPN Radio's broadcast of the 2002 NBA Finals as a guest, later being hired full-time by ESPN for their radio broadcasts of the NBA starting with the 2002–03 season.

== Career playing statistics ==
Legend
GP	Games played	GS	Games started	MPG	Minutes per game
FG%	Field goal percentage	3P%	3-point field goal percentage	FT%	Free throw percentage
RPG	Rebounds per game	APG	Assists per game	SPG	Steals per game
BPG	Blocks per game	PPG	Points per game	**Bold**	Career high
*	Led the league

=== NBA ===
==== Regular season ====
Year	Team	GP	GS	MPG	FG%	FT%	RPG	APG	PPG
1962–63	Detroit	57		14.8	.368	.710	1.9	1.8	6.4
1963–64	Detroit	1		2.0	.250	–	.0	.0	2.0
1963–64	Baltimore	65		22.4	.375	.712	2.1	2.8	9.2
1964–65	Baltimore	80*		30.2	.424	.754	2.9	3.7	12.8
1965–66	Baltimore	74		33.2	.416	.830	3.1	4.8	18.2
1966–67	Baltimore	76		33.9	.398	.825	**4.6**	3.8	18.2
1967–68	Baltimore	77		29.8	.406	.778	3.2	3.3	15.9
1968–69	Baltimore	80		**39.2**	.438	.803	3.3	4.8	**22.6**
1969–70	Baltimore	55		37.0	**.441**	**.849**	3.1	**5.3**	21.9
1970–71	Baltimore	**82**		27.6	.403	.831	2.7	3.7	15.1
1971–72	Baltimore	2		21.0	.235	.625	2.5	4.0	6.5
1971–72	Philadelphia	74	**29**	23.4	.426	.827	2.4	2.5	12.6
1972–73	Philadelphia	32	21	29.8	.396	.823	3.5	4.6	13.9
Career		755	50	29.4	.413	.803	3.0	3.7	15.3

==== Playoffs ====
Year	Team	GP	MPG	FG%	FT%	RPG	APG	PPG
1963	Detroit	2	13.0	.100	**1.000**	.0	2.0	1.5
1965	Baltimore	10	29.7	.387	.895	3.4	3.0	14.0
1966	Baltimore	3	9.0	**.429**	.500	.3	.3	3.0
1969	Baltimore	4	**43.3**	.367	.657	**4.5**	**5.3**	**20.3**
1970	Baltimore	7	21.9	.338	.714	2.3	1.1	9.6
1971	Baltimore	**17**	29.4	.396	.753	2.2	3.1	13.6
Career		43	27.3	.375	.753	2.5	2.7	12.4

== Head coaching record ==
*	Record

Legend
Regular season	G	Games coached	W	Games won	L	Games lost	W–L %	Win–loss %
Playoffs	PG	Playoff games	PW	Playoff wins	PL	Playoff losses	PW–L %	Playoff win–loss %

Team	Year	G	W	L	W–L%	Finish	PG	PW	PL	PW–L%	Result
PHI	1972–73	31	5	26	.161	4th in Atlantic	—	—	—	—	Missed Playoffs
New York Nets	1973–74	84	55	29	.655	1st in Eastern	14	12	2	.857	Won ABA Finals
New York Nets	1974–75	84	58	26	.690	1st in Eastern	5	1	4	.200	Lost Division semifinals
New York Nets	1975–76	84	55	29	.655	2nd	13	8	5	.615	Won ABA Finals
NYN	1976–77	82	22	60	.268	5th in Atlantic	—	—	—	—	Missed Playoffs
NJN	1977–78	82	24	58	.293	5th in Atlantic	—	—	—	—	Missed Playoffs
NJN	1978–79	82	37	45	.451	3rd in Atlantic	2	0	2	.000	Lost in First Round
NJN	1979–80	82	34	48	.415	5th in Atlantic	—	—	—	—	Missed Playoffs
NJN	1980–81	35	12	23	.343	(fired)	—	—	—	—	—
ATL	1981–82	82	42	40	.512	2nd in Central	2	0	2	.000	Lost in First Round
ATL	1982–83	82	43	39	.524	2nd in Central	3	1	2	.333	Lost in First Round
CHI	1983–84	82	27	55	.329	5th in Central	—	—	—	—	Missed Playoffs
CHI	1984–85	82	38	44	.463	3rd in Central	4	1	3	.250	Lost in First Round
WSH	1985–86	13	7	6	.538	3rd in Atlantic	5	2	3	.400	Lost in First Round
WSH	1986–87	82	42	40	.512	3rd in Atlantic	3	0	3	.000	Lost in First Round
WSH	1987–88	27	8	19	.296	(fired)	—	—	—	—	—
MIA	1991–92	82	38	44	.463	4th in Atlantic	3	0	3	.000	Lost in First Round
MIA	1992–93	82	36	46	.439	5th in Atlantic	—	—	—	—	Missed Playoffs
MIA	1993–94	82	42	40	.512	4th in Atlantic	5	2	3	.400	Lost in First Round
MIA	1994–95	46	17	29	.370	(fired)	—	—	—	—	—
Career ABA		252	168	84	.667		32	21	11	.656	
Career NBA		1,136	474	662	.417		27	6	21	.222	
Career Total		1,304	642	746	.463		59	27	32	.458	
