= Jeff Halliburton =

American basketball player (born 1949)

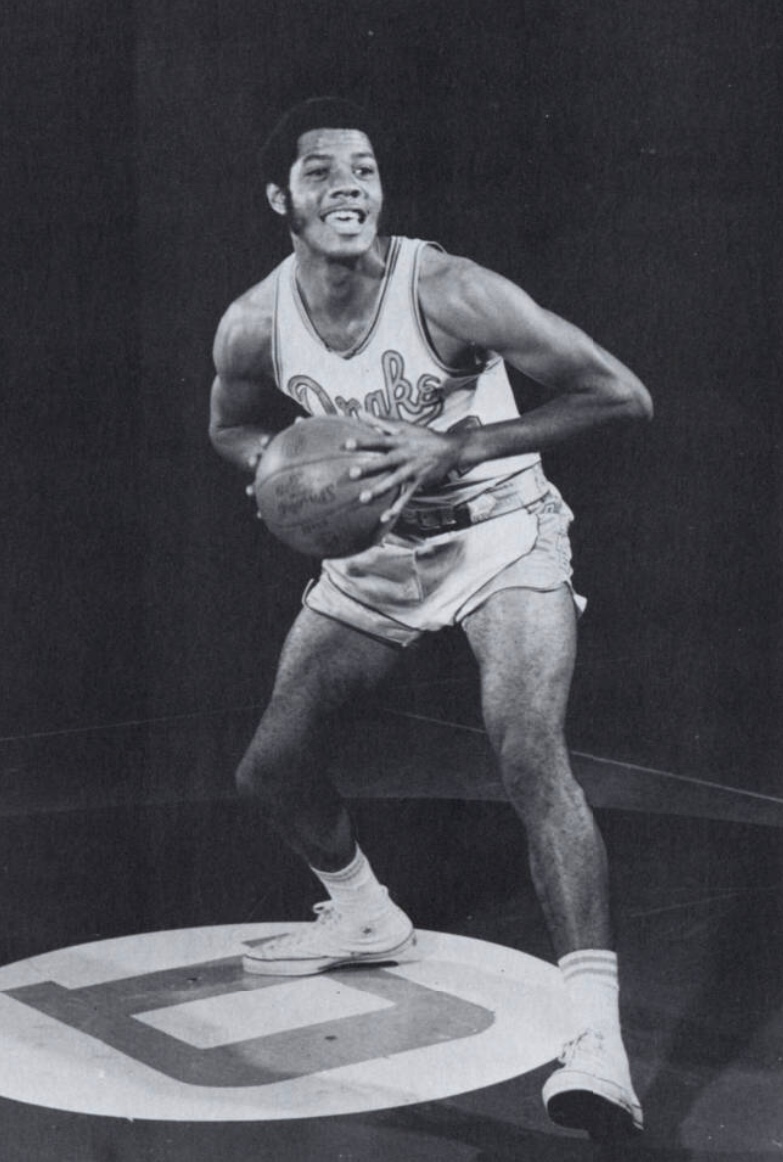
- Halliburton as a senior at Drake

Personal information
- Born: July 3, 1949 (age 77) Rockville Centre, New York, U.S.
- Listed height: 6 ft 5 in (1.96 m)
- Listed weight: 193 lb (88 kg)

Career information
- High school: Malverne (Malverne, New York)
- College: San Jacinto JC (1967–1969); Drake (1969–1971)
- NBA draft: 1971: 3rd round, 39th overall pick
- Drafted by: Atlanta Hawks
- Position: Shooting guard
- Number: 42

Career history
- 1971–1973: Atlanta Hawks
- 1973: Philadelphia 76ers
- 1975: Iberia Superstars

Career highlights
- MVC Player of the Year (1971); 2× First-team All-MVC (1970, 1971)
- Stats at NBA.com
- Stats at Basketball Reference

Jeffrey Halliburton (born July 3, 1949) is an American former basketball player who played in the National Basketball Association (NBA) for two seasons. He is the cousin of Basketball Hall of Famer Julius Erving.

== College career ==
Halliburton, a 6'5" guard, transferred to Drake University from San Jacinto Junior College and played for the Bulldogs for two seasons from 1969 to 1971. He led the Bulldogs to consecutive NCAA Tournament Regional Final appearances in 1970 and 1971. He was named first team All-Missouri Valley Conference both seasons at Drake, and was named MVC Player of the Year and an honorable mention All-American as a senior.

== Professional career ==
Halliburton was drafted in the third round of the 1971 NBA draft (39th pick overall) by the Atlanta Hawks. He played the 1971–72 season with the Hawks, averaging 4.0 points and 1.0 rebounds off the bench. He started the 1972–73 season with the Hawks, but was traded to the Philadelphia 76ers, where he averaged 9.5 points per game for the remainder of the season.

He played for the Iberia Superstars of the European Professional Basketball League in 1975.

== Career statistics ==
Legend
GP	Games played	GS	Games started	MPG	Minutes per game
FG%	Field goal percentage	3P%	3-point field goal percentage	FT%	Free throw percentage
RPG	Rebounds per game	APG	Assists per game	SPG	Steals per game
BPG	Blocks per game	PPG	Points per game	**Bold**	Career high

=== NBA ===
==== Regular season ====
Year	Team	GP	GS	MPG	FG%	FT%	RPG	APG	PPG
1971–72	Atlanta	**37**		7.8	**.459**	.833	1.0	.5	4.0
1972–73	Atlanta	24		9.9	.431	**.955**	1.1	1.2	5.0
1972–73	Philadelphia	31	0	**17.7**	.436	.758	**2.6**	**2.2**	**9.5**
Career		92	0 (Note: Halliburton's games started is officially listed at zero, because according to Basketball Reference, the 1972–73 76ers tracked games started while other teams had not yet. His starts with the Atlanta Hawks are unrecorded. Therefore, Halliburton's zero career starts is based on the only aforementioned confirmable stats with the 76ers.)	11.7	.440	.814	1.6	1.3	6.1

==== Playoffs ====
Year	Team	GP	MPG	FG%	FT%	RPG	APG	PPG
1972	Atlanta	1	2.0	.000	–	.0	.0	.0
