= Raymond Lewis =

American basketball player

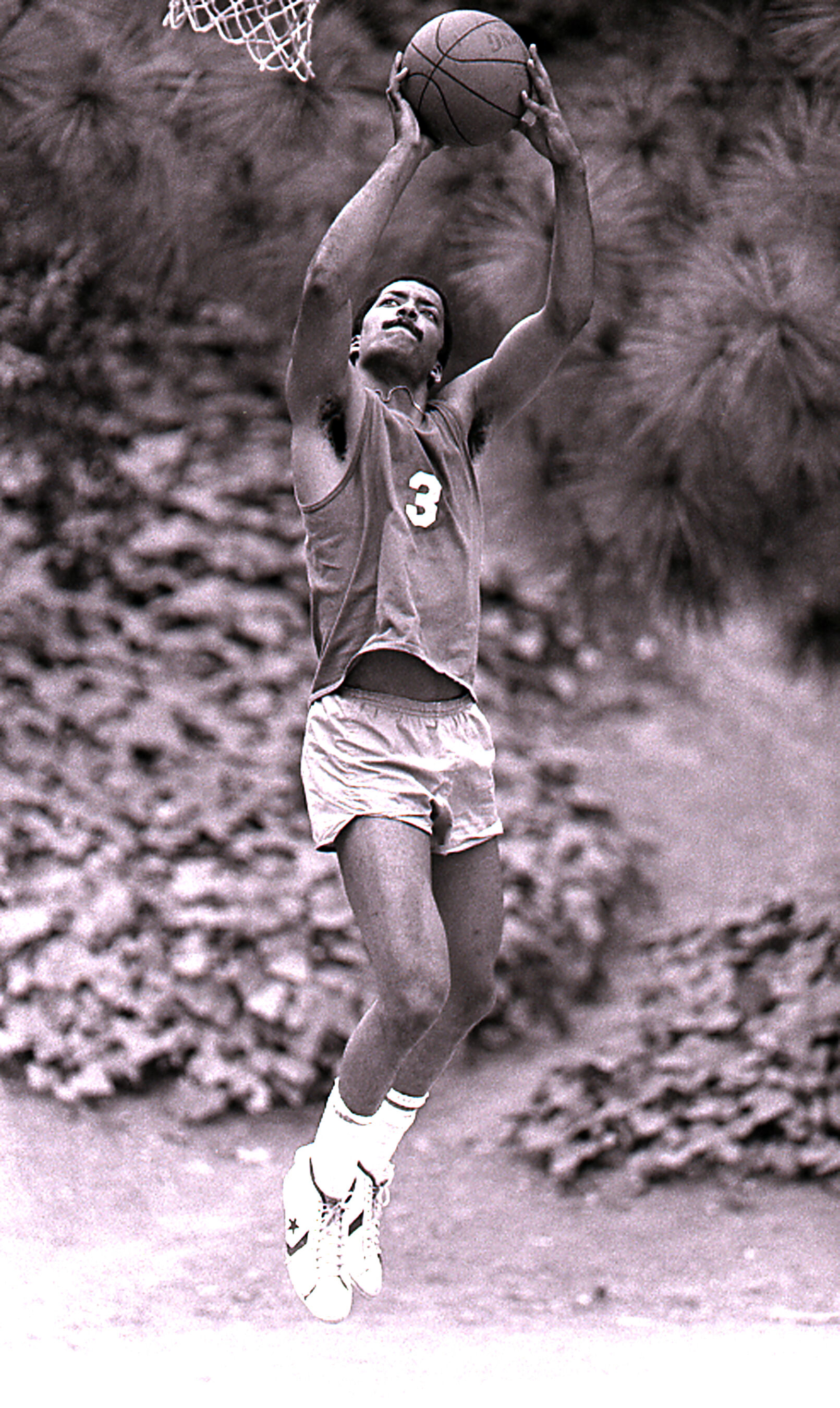

Personal information
- Born: September 3, 1952 Los Angeles, California, U.S.
- Died: February 11, 2001 (aged 48) Los Angeles, California, U.S.
- Listed height: 6 ft 2 in (1.88 m)
- Listed weight: 175 lb (79 kg)

Career information
- High school: Verbum Dei (Los Angeles, California)
- College: Cal State LA (1972–1973)
- NBA draft: 1973: 1st round, 18th overall pick
- Drafted by: Philadelphia 76ers
- Position: Guard

Career highlights
- First-team All-PCAA (1973); Second-team Parade All-American (1971)
- Stats at Basketball Reference

Raymond Lewis (September 3, 1952–February 11, 2001) was an American basketball and streetball player. After playing college basketball for Cal State LA, he was drafted by the Philadelphia 76ers in the first round of the 1973 NBA draft. He never played in the NBA but made a name for himself as one of the best streetball players in California.

== High school career ==
Lewis played high school basketball for Verbum Dei in Los Angeles where he led the Eagles to an 84–4 record and won three consecutive CIF titles from 1969 to 1971.

== College career ==
After his standout high school career, Lewis received around 250 scholarship offers, including from UCLA, USC, and Long Beach State. He ultimately accepted an offer from Cal State LA, allegedly after receiving a brand new red Corvette and a monthly $2000 payment. As a freshman, he averaged 39 points a game while shooting 58% from the field for the freshman team. He scored 73 points in a game against UC Santa Barbara. During his sophomore season, he averaged 32.9 points per game, finishing second in the nation behind Pepperdine's Bird Averitt. On February 23, 1973, he scored 53 points in a victory over a Jerry Tarkanian-coached Long Beach State. Allen was selected to the All-Pacific Coast Athletic Association first team in 1973.

== Professional career ==
The Philadelphia 76ers drafted Lewis eighteenth in the first round of the 1973 NBA draft. By all accounts he played spectacularly during rookie camp, outplaying Doug Collins, the No. 1 pick in the draft and a star for the 1972 U.S. Olympic team. However, after a contract dispute, the 76ers said Lewis walked out. According to Lewis in 1985, 76ers coach Gene Shue told him to sit out a year and mature. The following year Lewis said he left because the 76ers "tore up my original agreement and said, 'Now you have to make the team.' There were 12 guys on the team with guaranteed contracts. I said, 'Wait a minute.'"

In his second professional year, he tried to play for the ABA's Utah Stars but the 76ers threatened a lawsuit that kept him from playing. In 1975, he was invited back to Philadelphia one more time, for the third year of his three-year contract, but did not make the team.

== Illness and death ==
Lewis battled alcoholism and depression for the later part of his life. He died in February 2001 of complications following amputation of an infected leg and a stroke.
