= 2010–11 Southeastern Conference men's basketball season =

2010–11 SEC Men's Basketball Season
- League: NCAA Division I
- Sport: Basketball
- Teams: 12
- TV partner(s): CBS, ESPN, FSN

Regular Season
- 2011 SEC Champions: Florida
- Division Champions: Florida (East); Alabama (West)
- Season MVP: Chandler Parsons, Florida

Tournament
- Venue: Georgia Dome, Atlanta, Georgia
- Champions: Kentucky
- Runners-up: Florida
- Finals MVP: Darius Miller, Kentucky

Basketball seasons
- 09–10 11–12

2010–11 Southeastern Conference men's basketball standings
	Conf.				Overall
Team	W		L	PCT	W		L	PCT
East
No. 15 Florida	13	–	3	.813	29	–	8	.784
No. 11 Kentucky †	10	–	6	.625	29	–	9	.763
No. 25 Vanderbilt	9	–	7	.563	23	–	11	.676
Georgia	9	–	7	.563	21	–	12	.636
Tennessee	8	–	8	.500	19	–	15	.559
South Carolina	5	–	11	.313	14	–	16	.467
West
Alabama	12	–	4	.750	25	–	12	.676
Mississippi State	9	–	7	.563	17	–	14	.548
Ole Miss	7	–	9	.438	20	–	14	.588
Arkansas	7	–	9	.438	18	–	13	.581
Auburn	4	–	12	.250	11	–	20	.355
LSU	3	–	13	.188	11	–	21	.344
† 2011 SEC tournament winner As of April 2, 2011; Rankings from AP Poll

The 2010–11 Southeastern Conference men's basketball season began with practices on October 16, 2010, and ended with the SEC Tournament on March 10–13, 2011 at the Georgia Dome in Atlanta. The regular-season champion of the league and its East Division was Florida, with Alabama winning the West Division crown. Kentucky won the tournament crown and went on to make the Final Four of the NCAA tournament.

This was the last season for the SEC's two-division alignment in men's basketball. The league's head coaches voted at the league's annual meeting on June 1, 2011, to eliminate the divisional format, starting with the 2011–12 season.

== Pre-season polls and teams ==
Pre-Season Poll:

	SEC Media
	**SEC East**
1.	Florida
2.	Kentucky
3.	Georgia
4.	Tennessee
5.	Vanderbilt
6.	South Carolina
	**SEC West**
1.	Mississippi State
2.	Ole Miss
3.	Alabama
4.	Arkansas
5.	LSU
6.	Auburn

Pre-Season All-SEC Teams

SEC Media	SEC Coaches
Brandon Knight Kentucky; Travis Leslie Georgia; Jeffery Taylor Vanderbilt; **Trey Thompkins Georgia**; Chris WarrenOle Miss	Dee Bost Mississippi State; JaMychal Green Alabama; Scotty Hopson Tennessee; Travis Leslie Georgia; Chandler Parsons Florida; Marshawn Powell Arkansas; Jeffery Taylor Vanderbilt; **Trey Thompkins Georgia**; Chris WarrenOle Miss

- SEC Coaches select 8 players
- Players in bold are choices for SEC Player of the Year

== Rankings ==
Legend
Increase in ranking
Decrease in ranking
Not ranked previous week

		Pre	Wk 2	Wk 3	Wk 4	Wk 5	Wk 6	Wk 7	Wk 8	Wk 9	Wk 10	Wk 11	Wk 12	Wk 13	Wk 14	Wk 15	Wk 16	Wk 17	Wk 18	Wk 19	Final
Alabama	AP														RV	RV	RV	RV	RV		
Alabama	C														RV			RV	RV	–	
Arkansas	AP																				
Arkansas	C																				
Auburn	AP																				
Auburn	C																				
Florida	AP	9	9	16	18	RV	RV	20	RV	RV	RV	RV	24	RV	17	14	13	14	12	15	
Florida	C	11	10	14	16	24	24	19	RV	RV	RV	RV	23	23	19	15	13	14	12	–	
Georgia	AP	RV	RV	RV							24	RV	RV								
Georgia	C	RV	RV	RV							RV	RV	RV								
Kentucky	AP	11	12	8	10	17	17	13	11	10	13	12	14	10	18	22	22	20	15	11	
Kentucky	C	10	13	9	11	16	16	14	12	11	15	12	16	11	18	22	22	23	16		
LSU	AP																				
LSU	C																				
Mississippi State	AP	RV	RV	RV																	
Mississippi State	C	RV	RV	RV																	
Ole Miss	AP																				
Ole Miss	C																				
South Carolina	AP																				
South Carolina	C																				
Tennessee	AP	23	24	24	13	11	7	19	RV	RV					RV						
Tennessee	C	20	23	24	17	13	7	18	RV	RV											
Vanderbilt	AP	RV	RV	RV	RV	RV	RV	RV	24	22	RV	RV	19	23	23	18	18	21	RV	25	
Vanderbilt	C	RV	RV	RV	RV	RV	RV	RV	RV	24	RV	RV	24	24	24	18	18	20	24	–	

== Attendance ==
Rk	Team	Arena	Capacity	Gms.	Avg. Att.	% Full	Total Att.
1	Kentucky	Rupp Arena	23,500	15	23,603	100.4%	354,046
2	Tennessee	Thompson–Boling Arena	21,678	18	18,952	87.4%	341,130
3	Vanderbilt	Memorial Gymnasium	14,316	17	13,802	96.4%	234,632
4	Arkansas	Bud Walton Arena	19,368	19	11,884	61.4%	225,794
5	Alabama	Coleman Coliseum	15,316	16	11,757	76.8%	188,119
6	South Carolina	Colonial Life Arena	18,000	17	10,427	57.9%	177,254
7	Florida	O'Connell Center	12,000	17	10,186	84.9%	173,158
8	Georgia	Stegeman Coliseum	10,523	16	8,250	78.4%	131,998
9	LSU	Maravich Assembly Center	13,472	18	7,153	53.1%	128,749
10	Ole Miss	Tad Smith Coliseum	9,061	17	6,360	70.2%	108,120
11	Auburn	Auburn Arena	9,121	20	6,324	69.3%	126,483
12	Mississippi State	Humphrey Coliseum	10,500	17	5,710	54.4%	97,069
		**TOTALS**	**177,334**	**207**	11,200	**75.8%**	**2,286,552**

== Postseason ==
=== NCAA tournament ===
Seed	Region	School	First round	Second round	Sweet 16	Elite Eight	Final Four	Championship
2	Southeast	**Florida**	**W, 79–51** vs. #15 UC Santa Barbara – 3/17, Tampa, Florida	**W, 73–65** vs. #7 UCLA	**W, 83–74 (OT)** vs. #3 BYU – 3/24, New Orleans	**L, 71–74 (OT)** vs. #8 Butler		
4	East	**Kentucky**	**W, 59–57** vs. #13 Princeton – 3/17, Tampa, Florida	**W, 71–63** vs. #5 West Virginia	**W, 62–60** vs. #1 Ohio State – 3/25, Newark, New Jersey	**W, 76–69** vs. #4 North Carolina	**L, 55–56** vs. #3 Connecticut – 4/2, Houston	
5	Southwest	**Vanderbilt**	**L, 66–69** vs. #12 Richmond – 3/17, Denver					
9	West	**Tennessee**	**L, 45–75** vs. #8 Michigan – 3/18, Charlotte, North Carolina					
10	East	**Georgia**	**L, 65–68** vs. #7 Washington – 3/18, Charlotte, North Carolina					

=== National Invitation Tournament ===
# of Bids	Record	Win %	R2	R3	SF	CG
2	4–2	.667	1	1	1	1

Team	Bid Type	Seed	Results
Alabama	At-large	1	**W 68–44** vs. 8 Coastal Carolina; **W 74-67** vs. 4 New Mexico; **W 79–64** vs. 2 Miami (FL); **W 62–61** vs. 1 Colorado; **L 57-68** 4 Wichita State
Ole Miss	At-large	5	**L 74–77** vs. 4 California

== NBA draft ==
PG	Point guard	SG	Shooting guard	SF	Small forward	PF	Power forward	C	Center

Player	Team	Round	Pick #	Position	School	Nationality
Brandon Knight	Detroit Pistons	1	8	PG	Kentucky	United States
Tobias Harris	Charlotte Bobcats	1	19	SF	Tennessee	United States
Trey Thompkins	Los Angeles Clippers	2	37	PF	Georgia	United States
Chandler Parsons	Houston Rockets	2	38	SF	Florida	United States
Josh Harrellson	New Orleans Hornets	2	45	C	Kentucky	United States
Travis Leslie	Los Angeles Clippers	2	47	SG	Georgia	United States
Vernon Macklin	Detroit Pistons	2	52	PF	Florida	United States
DeAndre Liggins	Orlando Magic	2	53	SG	Kentucky	United States

== Awards and honors ==
=== All SEC teams and awards ===
The following individuals received postseason honors after having been chosen by the SEC coaches:

**2011 SEC Men's Basketball Individual Awards**
Award	Recipient(s)
Player of the Year	Chandler Parsons, FLORIDA
Coach of the Year	Billy Donovan, FLORIDA
Defensive Player of the Year	Sam Muldrow, F., SOUTH CAROLINA
Rookie of the Year	Terrence Jones, C., KENTUCKY
Scholar-Athlete of the Year	Riley Benock, G., MISSISSIPPI STATE
Sixth Man Award	Brian Williams, C., TENNESSEE

**2011 All-SEC Men's Basketball Teams**
First Team	Second Team	All-Defensive Team	All-Rookie Team
JaMychal Green, F., ALABAMA; Chandler Parsons†, F., FLORIDA; Trey Thompkins, F., GEORGIA; Terrence Jones, F., KENTUCKY; Brandon Knight, F., KENTUCKY; Chris Warren†, G., OLE MISS; Scotty Hopson, G., TENNESSEE; John Jenkins†, G., VANDERBILT	Tony Mitchell, F., ALABAMA; Rotnei Clarke, G., ARKANSAS; Kenny Boynton, G., FLORIDA; Erving Walker, G., FLORIDA; Travis Leslie, F., GEORGIA; Dee Bost, G., MISS STATE; Tobias Harris, F., TENNESSEE; Festus Ezeli, C., VANDERBILT; Jeffery Taylor, F., VANDERBILT	Delvon Johnson, F., ARKANSAS; DeAndre Liggins, G., KENTUCKY; Reginald Bucker, F., OLE MISS; Sam Muldrow, F., SOUTH CAROLINA; Jeffery Taylor, F., VANDERBILT	Trevor Releford, G., ALABAMA; Patric Young, F., FLORIDA; Terrence Jones, F., KENTUCKY; Brandon Knight, G., KENTUCKY; Doron Lamb, G., KENTUCKY; Ralston Turner, G., LSU; Bruce Ellington, G.,SOUTH CAROLINA; Tobias Harris, F.,TENNESSEE
† - denotes unanimous selection
