= 2010–11 Tennessee Volunteers basketball team =

American college basketball season

2010–11 Tennessee Volunteers basketball

NIT Season Tip-Off champions

NCAA tournament, Round of 64
- Conference: Southeastern Conference
- East
- Record: 19–15 (8–8 SEC)
- Head coach: Bruce Pearl (6th season)
- Assistant coaches: Tony Jones; Steve Forbes; Jason Shay
- Home arena: Thompson-Boling Arena

2010–11 Southeastern Conference men's basketball standings
	Conf.				Overall
Team	W		L	PCT	W		L	PCT
East
No. 15 Florida	13	–	3	.813	29	–	8	.784
No. 11 Kentucky †	10	–	6	.625	29	–	9	.763
No. 25 Vanderbilt	9	–	7	.563	23	–	11	.676
Georgia	9	–	7	.563	21	–	12	.636
Tennessee	8	–	8	.500	19	–	15	.559
South Carolina	5	–	11	.313	14	–	16	.467
West
Alabama	12	–	4	.750	25	–	12	.676
Mississippi State	9	–	7	.563	17	–	14	.548
Ole Miss	7	–	9	.438	20	–	14	.588
Arkansas	7	–	9	.438	18	–	13	.581
Auburn	4	–	12	.250	11	–	20	.355
LSU	3	–	13	.188	11	–	21	.344
† 2011 SEC tournament winner As of April 2, 2011; Rankings from AP Poll

The 2010–11 Tennessee Volunteers basketball team represented the University of Tennessee in the 2010–11 NCAA Division I men's basketball season. This was the sixth season for Bruce Pearl as the Volunteers' head coach. The team, a member of the Eastern Division of the Southeastern Conference, played its home games at Thompson-Boling Arena. They were the champions of the 2011 NIT Season Tip-Off. They finished the season 19–15, 8–8 in SEC play and lost in the quarterfinals of the 2011 SEC men's basketball tournament to Florida. They received an at-large bid to the 2011 NCAA Division I men's basketball tournament, where they lost in the second round to Michigan.

On March 21, 2011, Pearl was fired by the school for lying to NCAA investigators on recruiting violations.

== 2010–11 roster ==
2010–11 Tennessee Volunteers men's basketball team
Players
Coaches

Pos.	#	Name	Height	Weight	Year	Hometown
F	0	Renaldo Woolridge	6 ft 9 in (2.06 m)	212 lb (96 kg)	Jr	Sherman Oaks, CA
G	1	Jordan McRae	6 ft 6 in (1.98 m)	173 lb (78 kg)	Fr	Midway, GA
G	2	Melvin Goins	5 ft 11 in (1.8 m)	180 lb (82 kg)	RS Sr	San Diego, CA
G	10	Michael Hubert	6 ft 2 in (1.88 m)	205 lb (93 kg)	Sr	Hendersonville, TN
G	11	Trae Golden	6 ft 1 in (1.85 m)	207 lb (94 kg)	Fr	Powder Springs, GA
F	12	Tobias Harris	6 ft 8 in (2.03 m)	226 lb (103 kg)	Fr	Dix Hills, NY
G	13	Skylar McBee	6 ft 3 in (1.91 m)	184 lb (83 kg)	So	Rutledge, TN
G	14	Tyler Summitt	6 ft 0 in (1.83 m)	175 lb (79 kg)	Fr	Knoxville, TN
F	15	Rob Murphy	6 ft 7 in (2.01 m)	232 lb (105 kg)	RS Jr	Brentwood, TN
F	20	Kenny Hall	6 ft 8 in (2.03 m)	215 lb (98 kg)	So	Stone Mountain, GA
F	22	Steven Pearl	6 ft 5 in (1.96 m)	235 lb (107 kg)	Sr	Knoxville, TN
G	23	Cameron Tatum	6 ft 6 in (1.98 m)	192 lb (87 kg)	Jr	Lithonia, GA
G	24	Josh Bone	6 ft 3 in (1.91 m)	197 lb (89 kg)	RS Sr	Nashville, TN
F	25	John Fields	6 ft 9 in (2.06 m)	222 lb (101 kg)	Sr	Fayetteville, NC
G	32	Scotty Hopson	6 ft 7 in (2.01 m)	200 lb (91 kg)	Jr	Hopkinsville, KY
C	33	Brian Williams	6 ft 10 in (2.08 m)	275 lb (125 kg)	Sr	Bronx, NY
F	34	Jeronne Maymon	6 ft 7 in (2.01 m)	258 lb (117 kg)	RS So	Madison, WI

Head coach

- Bruce Pearl (Boston College)

Assistant coach(es)

- Tony Jones (Concordia–Ann Arbor)
- Steve Forbes (Southern Arkansas)
- Jason Shay (Iowa)

Legend

- (C) Team captain
- (S) Suspended
- (I) Ineligible
- (W) Walk-on
- Injured
- Current redshirt

== Class of 2010 signees ==
College recruiting
Name	Hometown	School	Height	Weight	Commit date
Tobias Harris; F	Dix Hills, New York	Half Hollow Hills West HS	6 ft 8 in (2.03 m)	220 lb (100 kg)	Oct 29, 2009
Tobias Harris; F	Recruit ratings: Scout: Rivals: (97)				
Jordan McRae; G	Midway, Georgia	Liberty County HS	6 ft 6 in (1.98 m)	170 lb (77 kg)	Sep 20, 2008
Jordan McRae; G	Recruit ratings: Scout: Rivals: (94)				
Trae Golden; G	Powder Springs, Georgia	McEachern High School	6 ft 2 in (1.88 m)	190 lb (86 kg)	Sep 16, 2009
Trae Golden; G	Recruit ratings: Scout: Rivals: (94)				
Overall recruit ranking: Scout: 9 Rivals: 10
Note: In many cases, Scout, Rivals, 247Sports, On3, and ESPN may conflict in their listings of height and weight.; In these cases, the average was taken. ESPN grades are on a 100-point scale.; Sources: "Tennessee Basketball Commitments". Rivals.; "2010 Tennessee Basketball Commits". Scout.; "ESPN". ESPN.; "Scout.com Team Recruiting Rankings". Scout.; "2010 Team Ranking". Rivals.

== Schedule ==
Date time, TV	Rank^{#}	Opponent^{#}	Result	Record	Site (attendance) city, state
Exhibition
November 3*; 7:30 pm, SportSouth	No. 23	Brevard	W 91–42	—	Thompson-Boling Arena (17,878); Knoxville, TN
November 8*; 7:30 pm, SportSouth	No. 23	Indianapolis	L 64–79	—	Thompson-Boling Arena (16,701); Knoxville, TN
Non-conference regular season
November 12*; 9:00 pm, SportSouth	No. 23	Chattanooga	W 82–62	1–0	Thompson-Boling Arena (20,613); Knoxville, TN
November 16*; 9:30 pm, ESPNU	No. 24	Belmont; NIT Season Tip-Off first round	W 85–76	2–0	Thompson-Boling Arena (16,783); Knoxville, TN
November 17*; 7:00 pm	No. 24	Missouri State; NIT Season Tip-Off second round	W 60–56	3–0	Thompson-Boling Arena (16,001); Knoxville, TN
November 24*; 7:00 pm, ESPN2	No. 24	vs. VCU; NIT Season Tip-Off semi-finals	W 77–72	4–0	Madison Square Garden; Manhattan, NY
November 26*; 5:00 pm, ESPN	No. 24	vs. No. 7 Villanova; NIT Season Tip-Off finals	W 78–68	5–0	Madison Square Garden (7,228); Manhattan, NY
November 30*; 7:30 pm, FSN South	No. 13	Middle Tennessee	W 86–56	6–0	Thompson-Boling Arena (17,084); Knoxville, TN
December 11*; 3:15 pm, ESPN	No. 11	vs. No. 3 Pittsburgh; SEC/Big East Invitational	W 83–76	7–0	CONSOL Energy Center (15,166); Pittsburgh, PA
December 14*; 7:00 pm, ESPNU	No. 7	Oakland	L 82–89	7–1	Thompson-Boling Arena (16,784); Knoxville, TN
December 17*; 8:00 pm, CBS College Sports	No. 7	at Charlotte	L 48–49	7–2	Time Warner Cable Arena (8,419); Charlotte, NC
December 21*; 7:00 pm, SportSouth	No. 19	USC	L 64–65	7–3	Thompson-Boling Arena (19,030); Knoxville, TN
December 23*; 7:30 pm, SportSouth	No. 19	Belmont	W 66–65	8–3	Thompson-Boling Arena (17,594); Knoxville, TN
December 29*; 7:00 pm, CSS		UT Martin	W 68–62	9–3	Thompson-Boling Arena (17,481); Knoxville, TN
December 31*; 2:00 pm, ESPN2		College of Charleston	L 78–91	9–4	Thompson-Boling Arena (17,794); Knoxville, TN
January 5*; 9:00 pm, ESPN2		No. 21 Memphis	W 104–84	10–4	Thompson-Boling Arena (18,664); Knoxville, TN
SEC regular season
January 8; 1:30 pm, SEC Network		at Arkansas	L 65–68	10–5 (0–1)	Bud Walton Arena (12,044); Fayetteville, AR
January 11; 9:00 pm, ESPN		Florida; Super Tuesday	L 75–81 ^{OT}	10–6 (0–2)	Thompson-Boling Arena (19,846); Knoxville, TN
January 15; 12:00 pm, ESPN		Vanderbilt; ESPN College GameDay	W 67–64	11–6 (1–2)	Thompson-Boling Arena (21,198); Knoxville, TN
January 18; 7:00 pm, ESPNU		at Georgia	W 59–57	12–6 (2–2)	Stegeman Coliseum (10,523); Athens, GA
January 22*; 2:00 pm, CBS		at No. 8 Connecticut	L 61–72	12–7	XL Center (16,294); Hartford, CT
January 26; 9:00 pm, SEC Network		LSU	W 75–53	13–7 (3–2)	Thompson-Boling Arena (18,991); Knoxville, TN
January 29; 4:00 pm, SEC Network		at Mississippi	W 74–58	14–7 (4–2)	Tad Smith Coliseum (8,807); Oxford, MS
February 3; 9:00 pm, ESPN		at Auburn	W 69–56	15–7 (5–2)	Auburn Arena (6,274); Auburn, AL
February 5; 5:00 pm, FSN South		Alabama	L 60–65 ^{OT}	15–8 (5–3)	Thompson-Boling Arena (21,948); Knoxville, TN
February 8; 9:00 pm, ESPN		at No. 18 Kentucky; Super Tuesday	L 61–73	15–9 (5–4)	Rupp Arena (24,334); Lexington, KY
February 12; 6:00 pm, ESPN		at No. 17 Florida	L 60–61	15–10 (5–5)	O'Connell Center (12,630); Gainesville, FL
February 16; 7:00 pm, CSS		South Carolina	W 73–67	16–10 (6–5)	Thompson-Boling Arena (18,402); Knoxville, TN
February 19; 1:00 pm, CBS		Georgia	L 63–69	16–11 (6–6)	Thompson-Boling Arena (20,462); Knoxville, TN
February 22; 9:00 pm, ESPN		at No. 18 Vanderbilt; Super Tuesday	W 60–51	17–11 (7–6)	Memorial Gym (14,316); Nashville, TN
February 26; 6:00 pm, ESPN		Mississippi State	L 69–70	17–12 (7–7)	Thompson-Boling Arena (20,777); Knoxville, TN
March 3; 7:00 pm, ESPN		at South Carolina	W 73–69	18–12 (8–7)	Colonial Life Arena (10,137); Columbia, SC
March 6; 12:00 pm, CBS		No. 20 Kentucky; Senior Day	L 58–64	18–13 (8–8)	Thompson-Boling Arena (21,678); Knoxville, TN
SEC Tournament
March 10; 7:30 pm, SEC Network	(E5)	vs. (W4) Arkansas; SEC First Round	W 74–68	19–13	Georgia Dome; Atlanta, GA
March 11; 7:30 pm, SEC Network	(E5)	vs. (E1) No. 12 Florida; SEC Quarterfinals	L 74–85	19–14	Georgia Dome (17,096); Atlanta, GA
NCAA Tournament
March 18*; 12:40 pm, truTV	(9 W)	vs. (8 W) Michigan; NCAA Second round	L 45–75	19–15	Time Warner Cable Arena; Charlotte, NC
*Non-conference game. ^{#}Rankings from AP Poll. (#) Tournament seedings in parentheses. W=NCAA West Regional.
