= 2010–11 Auburn Tigers men's basketball team =

American college basketball season

2010–11 Auburn Tigers men's basketball
- Conference: Southeastern Conference
- West
- Record: 11–20 (4–12 SEC)
- Head coach: Tony Barbee (1st season)
- Assistant coaches: Tony Madlock; Randall Dickey; Milt Wagner
- Captains: Josh Wallace; Earnest Ross
- Home arena: Auburn Arena

2010–11 Southeastern Conference men's basketball standings
	Conf.				Overall
Team	W		L	PCT	W		L	PCT
East
No. 15 Florida	13	–	3	.813	29	–	8	.784
No. 11 Kentucky †	10	–	6	.625	29	–	9	.763
No. 25 Vanderbilt	9	–	7	.563	23	–	11	.676
Georgia	9	–	7	.563	21	–	12	.636
Tennessee	8	–	8	.500	19	–	15	.559
South Carolina	5	–	11	.313	14	–	16	.467
West
Alabama	12	–	4	.750	25	–	12	.676
Mississippi State	9	–	7	.563	17	–	14	.548
Ole Miss	7	–	9	.438	20	–	14	.588
Arkansas	7	–	9	.438	18	–	13	.581
Auburn	4	–	12	.250	11	–	20	.355
LSU	3	–	13	.188	11	–	21	.344
† 2011 SEC tournament winner As of April 2, 2011; Rankings from AP Poll

The 2010–11 Auburn Tigers men's basketball team represented Auburn University in the 2010–11 NCAA Division I men's basketball season. This season marked a new era for the school in more than one respect. It was the first year of the Tony Barbee era of Auburn basketball. Barbee replaced ousted coach Jeff Lebo who was fired after a 15–17 (6–10) season. Also, the Tigers left their home since the middle of the 1968–69 season, Beard–Eaves–Memorial Coliseum, and moved into the new Auburn Arena.

== Schedule and results ==
Date time, TV	Rank^{#}	Opponent^{#}	Result	Record	Site city, state
Exhibition
November 3, 2010*; 7:00 p.m.		West Alabama	W 79–66	—	Auburn Arena; Auburn, AL
November 8, 2010*; 7:00 p.m.		Columbus State	L 52–54	—	Auburn Arena; Auburn, AL
Regular season
November 12, 2010*; 8:00 p.m.		UNC Asheville	L 69–70 ^{OT}	0–1	Auburn Arena; Auburn, AL
November 19, 2010*; 7:30 p.m.		Samford; Global Sports Hoops Showcase	L 68–79	0–2	Auburn Arena; Auburn, AL
November 20, 2010*; 4:30 p.m.		Campbell; Global Sports Hoops Showcase	L 54–61	0–3	Auburn Arena; Auburn, AL
November 21, 2010*; 5:00 p.m., CSS		Middle Tennessee; Global Sports Hoops Showcase	W 68–66	1–3	Auburn Arena; Auburn, AL
November 27, 2010*; 7:00 p.m.		Jacksonville	L 55–69	1–4	Auburn Arena; Auburn, AL
November 30, 2010*; 7:00 p.m.		Georgia Southwestern State	W 78–50	2–4	Auburn Arena; Auburn, AL
December 5, 2010*; 7:00 p.m.		Arkansas–Pine Bluff	W 76–72	3–4	Auburn Arena; Auburn, AL
December 11, 2010*; 11:30 a.m., ESPN2		vs. Rutgers; SEC-Big East Invitational	L 54–63	3–5	Consol Energy Center; Pittsburgh, PA
December 15, 2010*; 9:00 p.m., ESPNU		at South Florida	L 49–61	3–6	USF Sun Dome; Tampa, FL
December 18, 2010*; 8:00 p.m.		Presbyterian	L 59–62	3–7	Auburn Arena; Auburn, AL
December 21, 2010*; 8:00 p.m.		USC Upstate	W 68–54	4–7	Auburn Arena; Auburn, AL
December 29, 2010*; 7:00 p.m.		Georgia Southern	W 88–84 ^{OT}	5–7	Auburn Arena; Auburn, AL
December 31, 2010*; 4:00 p.m.		Grambling State	W 63–45	6–7	Auburn Arena; Auburn, AL
January 3, 2011*; 7:00 p.m., FSN		Florida State	W 65–60	7–7	Auburn Arena; Auburn, AL
January 8, 2011; 5:00 p.m., FSN		LSU	L 55–62	7–8 (0–1)	Auburn Arena; Auburn, AL
January 11, 2011; 6:00 p.m., ESPNU		at Kentucky	L 54–78	7–9 (0–2)	Rupp Arena; Lexington, KY
January 16, 2011; 2:00 p.m., FSN		at Mississippi State	L 66–85	7–10 (0–3)	Humphrey Coliseum; Starkville, MS
January 20, 2011; 6:00 p.m., ESPN		Florida	L 40–45	7–11 (0–4)	Auburn Arena; Auburn, AL
January 22, 2011; 5:00 p.m., CSS		Alabama; Iron Bowl of Basketball	L 58–68	7–12 (0–5)	Auburn Arena; Auburn, AL
January 25, 2011; 8:00 p.m., ESPNU		at Arkansas	L 64–73	7–13 (0–6)	Bud Walton Arena; Fayetteville, AR
January 29, 2011; 12:30 p.m., SEC Network		at South Carolina	W 79–64	8–13 (1–6)	Colonial Life Arena; Columbia, SC
February 3, 2011; 8:00 p.m., ESPN		Tennessee	L 56–69	8–14 (1–7)	Auburn Arena; Auburn, AL
February 5, 2011; 12:45 p.m., SEC Network		at Georgia	L 72–81 ^{OT}	8–15 (1–8)	Stegeman Coliseum; Athens, GA
February 12, 2011; 6:00 p.m., FSN		Mississippi State	W 65–62	9–15 (2–8)	Auburn Arena; Auburn, AL
February 16, 2011; 7:00 p.m., SEC Network		at Ole Miss	L 59–90	9–16 (2–9)	Tad Smith Coliseum; Oxford, MS
February 19, 2011; 3:00 p.m., SEC Network		No. 18 Vanderbilt	L 60–77	9–17 (2–10)	Auburn Arena; Auburn, AL
February 23, 2011; 7:00 p.m., SEC Network		at Alabama; Iron Bowl of Basketball	L 49–51	9–18 (2–11)	Coleman Coliseum; Tuscaloosa, AL
February 26, 2011; 12:30 p.m., SEC Network		Arkansas	L 55–57	9–19 (2–12)	Auburn Arena; Auburn, AL
March 2, 2011; 7:00 p.m., SEC Network		Ole Miss	W 76–73	10–19 (3–12)	Auburn Arena; Auburn, AL
March 5, 2011; 6:00 p.m., FSN		at LSU	W 60–51	11–19 (4–12)	Pete Maravich Assembly Center; Baton Rouge, LA
SEC tournament
March 10, 2011; 1:00 p.m., SEC Network	(W5)	vs. (E4) Georgia; SEC First Round	L 51–69	11–20	Georgia Dome; Atlanta, GA
*Non-conference game. ^{#}Rankings from AP Poll. (#) Tournament seedings in parentheses.

Source: 2010-11 Auburm Tigers basketball schedule
