= 2010–11 Mississippi State Bulldogs basketball team =

American college basketball season

2010–11 Mississippi State Bulldogs men's basketball
- Conference: Southeastern Conference
- West
- Record: 17–14 (9–7 SEC)
- Head coach: Rick Stansbury (13th season)
- Assistant coaches: Robert Kirby; Phil Cunningham; Marcus Grant
- Home arena: Humphrey Coliseum

2010–11 Southeastern Conference men's basketball standings
	Conf.				Overall
Team	W		L	PCT	W		L	PCT
East
No. 15 Florida	13	–	3	.813	29	–	8	.784
No. 11 Kentucky †	10	–	6	.625	29	–	9	.763
No. 25 Vanderbilt	9	–	7	.563	23	–	11	.676
Georgia	9	–	7	.563	21	–	12	.636
Tennessee	8	–	8	.500	19	–	15	.559
South Carolina	5	–	11	.313	14	–	16	.467
West
Alabama	12	–	4	.750	25	–	12	.676
Mississippi State	9	–	7	.563	17	–	14	.548
Ole Miss	7	–	9	.438	20	–	14	.588
Arkansas	7	–	9	.438	18	–	13	.581
Auburn	4	–	12	.250	11	–	20	.355
LSU	3	–	13	.188	11	–	21	.344
† 2011 SEC tournament winner As of April 2, 2011; Rankings from AP Poll

The 2010–11 Mississippi State Bulldogs men's basketball team represented Mississippi State University in the 2010–11 college basketball season. This was head coach Rick Stansbury's thirteenth season at Mississippi State. The Bulldogs competed in the Southeastern Conference and played their home games at Humphrey Coliseum, nicknamed The Hump.

== Roster ==
2010–11 Mississippi State Bulldogs men's basketball team
Players
Coaches

Pos.	#	Name	Height	Weight	Year	Hometown
G	0	Jalen Steele	6 ft 3 in (1.91 m)	190 lb (86 kg)	Fr	Knoxville, TN
F	1	Renardo Sidney	6 ft 10 in (2.08 m)	270 lb (122 kg)	So	Jackson, MS
G	2	Ravern Johnson	6 ft 7 in (2.01 m)	175 lb (79 kg)	Sr	Lyon, MS
G	3	Dee Bost	6 ft 2 in (1.88 m)	176 lb (80 kg)	Jr	Concord, NC
G	4	Twany Beckham	6 ft 5 in (1.96 m)	195 lb (88 kg)	RS So	Louisville, KY
G	10	Shaunessy Smith	6 ft 6 in (1.98 m)	207 lb (94 kg)	RS Fr	Macon, MS
G	12	Charles Parker	5 ft 10 in (1.78 m)	168 lb (76 kg)	So	McKinney, TX
G	15	Riley Benock	6 ft 4 in (1.93 m)	193 lb (88 kg)	Sr	Battletown, KY
F	20	Taylor Luczak	6 ft 8 in (2.03 m)	195 lb (88 kg)	Jr	Glen Falls, NY
G	21	Baxter Price	5 ft 9 in (1.75 m)	156 lb (71 kg)	So	Brandon, MS
G	22	Brian Bryant	6 ft 3 in (1.91 m)	160 lb (73 kg)	Jr	Albany, GA
F	23	Arnett Moultrie (redshirt)	6 ft 11 in (2.11 m)	230 lb (104 kg)	Jr	Memphis, TN
F	24	Kodi Augustus	6 ft 8 in (2.03 m)	224 lb (102 kg)	Sr	Baton Rouge, LA
C	30	Wendell Lewis	6 ft 8 in (2.03 m)	253 lb (115 kg)	So	Selma, AL
G	33	Brandon Bolen	6 ft 3 in (1.91 m)	208 lb (94 kg)	Jr	Madison, MS
F	45	Elgin Bailey	6 ft 8 in (2.03 m)	276 lb (125 kg)	RS Jr	New Orleans, LA
C	50	John Riek	7 ft 1 in (2.16 m)	250 lb (113 kg)	So	Khartoum, Sudan

Head coach

- Rick Stansbury (Campbellsville)

Assistant coach(es)

- George Brooks (Mississippi State)
- Phil Cunningham (Campbellsville)
- Marcus Grant (Mississippi State)

Legend

- (C) Team captain
- (S) Suspended
- (I) Ineligible
- (W) Walk-on
- Injured
- Current redshirt

== Schedule ==
Date time, TV	Rank^{#}	Opponent^{#}	Result	Record	Site city, state
Exhibition
November 6*; 7:00 pm		Lindsey Wilson	W 75–66	–	Humphrey Coliseum; Starkville, MS
Non-conference regular season
November 12*; 7:00 pm		Tennessee State	W 75–65	1–0	Humphrey Coliseum; Starkville, MS
November 19*; 7:00 pm		Appalachian State	W 76–74	2–0	Humphrey Coliseum; Starkville, MS
November 22*; 7:00 pm		Detroit	W 82–76	3–0	Humphrey Coliseum; Starkville, MS
November 26*; 6:00 pm		Troy	W 92–83 ^{OT}	4–0	Humphrey Coliseum; Starkville, MS
November 30*; 7:00 pm		Florida Atlantic	L 59–61	4–1	Humphrey Coliseum; Starkville, MS
December 11*; 7:00 pm		East Tennessee State	L 62–63	4–2	Humphrey Coliseum; Starkville, MS
December 12*; 1:00 pm		North Carolina A&T	W 74–58	5–2	Humphrey Coliseum; Starkville, MS
December 13*; 7:00 pm		Nicholls	W 67–58	6–2	Humphrey Coliseum; Starkville, MS
December 14*; 7:00 pm, CSS		Alabama State	W 67–46	7–2	Humphrey Coliseum; Starkville, MS
December 15*; 7:00 pm		Belhaven; Exhibition	W 101–76	—	Mississippi Coliseum; Jackson, MS
December 18*; 7:00 pm		vs. Virginia Tech; Battle at Atlantis	L 57–88	7–3	Atlantis Resort; Nassau, Bahamas
December 22*; 2:00 pm, ESPNU		vs. Washington State; 2010 Diamond Head Classic	L 57–83	7–4	Stan Sheriff Center; Honolulu, HI
December 22*; ESPNU		vs. San Diego; 2010 Diamond Head Classic	W 69–52	8–4	Stan Sheriff Center; Honolulu, HI
December 23*; ESPNU		at Hawaii; 2010 Diamond Head Classic	L 57–68	8–5	Stan Sheriff Center; Honolulu, HI
December 29*; 10:00, ESPNU		vs. Saint Mary's	L 72–94	8–6	Orleans Arena; Paradise, NV
SEC regular season
January 8; 4:00, SEC Network		Alabama	L 57–75	8–7 (0–1)	Humphrey Coliseum; Starkville, MS
January 13; 9:00, ESPN		at Ole Miss	W 69–64	9–7 (1–1)	Tad Smith Coliseum; Oxford, MS
January 16; 2:00, FSN		Auburn	W 85–66	10–7 (2–1)	Humphrey Coliseum; Starkville, MS
January 22; 4:00, SEC Network		at Georgia	L 64–86	10–8 (2–2)	Stegeman Coliseum; Athens, GA
January 27; 7:00, ESPN		Vanderbilt	L 74–81	10–9 (2–3)	Humphrey Coliseum; Starkville, MS
January 29; 1:00, CBS		Florida	W 71–64	11–9 (3–3)	Humphrey Coliseum; Starkville, MS
February 2; 8:00, SEC Network		at Alabama	L 61–75	11–10 (3–4)	Coleman Coliseum; Tuscaloosa, AL
February 5; 4:00, SEC Network		at LSU	W 58–57	12–10 (4–4)	Pete Maravich Assembly Center; Baton Rouge, LA
February 9; 8:00, SEC Network		Arkansas	W 67–56	13–10 (5–4)	Humphrey Coliseum; Starkville, MS
February 12; 7:00, FSN		at Auburn	L 62–65	13–11 (5–5)	Auburn Arena; Auburn, AL
February 15; 7:00, ESPN		at Kentucky; Super Tuesday	L 79–85	13–12 (5–6)	Rupp Arena; Lexington, KY
February 19; 1:30, SEC Network		Ole Miss	W 71–58	14–12 (6–6)	Humphrey Coliseum; Starkville, MS
February 23; 9:00, CSS		LSU	L 82–84	14–13 (6–7)	Humphrey Coliseum; Starkville, MS
February 26; 6:00, ESPN		at Tennessee	W 70–69	15–13 (7–7)	Thompson–Boling Arena; Knoxville, TN
March 2; 9:00, CSS		at Arkansas	W 88–78	16–13 (8–7)	Bud Walton Arena; Fayetteville, AR
March 5; 2:00, ESPN		South Carolina; Senior Day	W 60–58	17–13 (9–7)	Humphrey Coliseum; Starkville, MS
2011 SEC Tournament
March 11; 10:10, SEC Network	(W2)	vs. (E3) No. 24 Vanderbilt; 2011 SEC tournament	L 81–87	17–14	Georgia Dome; Atlanta, GA
*Non-conference game. ^{#}Rankings from AP Poll. (#) Tournament seedings in parentheses.
