= 2010–11 Ole Miss Rebels men's basketball team =

American college basketball season

2010–11 Ole Miss Rebels men's basketball

NIT, First Round
- Conference: Southeastern Conference
- West
- Record: 20–14 (7–9 SEC)
- Head coach: Andy Kennedy
- Assistant coaches: Mike White; Owen Miller; Torrey Ward
- Home arena: Tad Smith Coliseum

2010–11 Southeastern Conference men's basketball standings
	Conf.				Overall
Team	W		L	PCT	W		L	PCT
East
No. 15 Florida	13	–	3	.813	29	–	8	.784
No. 11 Kentucky †	10	–	6	.625	29	–	9	.763
No. 25 Vanderbilt	9	–	7	.563	23	–	11	.676
Georgia	9	–	7	.563	21	–	12	.636
Tennessee	8	–	8	.500	19	–	15	.559
South Carolina	5	–	11	.313	14	–	16	.467
West
Alabama	12	–	4	.750	25	–	12	.676
Mississippi State	9	–	7	.563	17	–	14	.548
Ole Miss	7	–	9	.438	20	–	14	.588
Arkansas	7	–	9	.438	18	–	13	.581
Auburn	4	–	12	.250	11	–	20	.355
LSU	3	–	13	.188	11	–	21	.344
† 2011 SEC tournament winner As of April 2, 2011; Rankings from AP Poll

The 2010–11 Ole Miss Rebels men's basketball team represented the University of Mississippi during the 2010–11 college basketball season. This was head coach Andy Kennedy's fifth season at Ole Miss. The Rebels competed in the Southeastern Conference and played their home games at Tad Smith Coliseum. They finished the season 20–14, 9–7 in SEC play. They lost in the quarterfinals of the 2011 SEC men's basketball tournament to Kentucky. They were invited to the 2011 National Invitation Tournament where they lost in the first round to California.

== Schedule ==
Date time, TV	Rank^{#}	Opponent^{#}	Result	Record	Site city, state
Exhibition
November 5*; 7:00 pm		Delta State	W 86–52	—	Tad Smith Coliseum; Oxford, Mississippi
Non-conference regular season
November 12*; 7:00 pm		Arkansas State	W 68–60	1–0	Tad Smith Coliseum; Oxford, Mississippi
November 17*; 8:00 pm		Murray State	W 77–61	2–0	Tad Smith Coliseum; Oxford, Mississippi
November 20*; 6:00 pm		Dayton	L 71–78	2–1	Tad Smith Coliseum; Oxford, Mississippi
November 26*; 7:00 pm		Penn State	W 84–71	3–1	Tad Smith Coliseum; Oxford, Mississippi
November 30*; 7:00 pm, FS Florida/NESN		at Miami (FL)	L 73–86	3–2	BankUnited Center; Coral Gables, Florida
December 4*; 8:00 pm, ESPNU		Southern Miss	W 86–81	4–2	Tad Smith Coliseum; Oxford, Mississippi
December 12*; 2:00 pm		at Arkansas–Little Rock	W 84–70	5–2	Jack Stephens Center; Little Rock, Arkansas
December 13*; 7:00 pm		Mississippi Valley State	W 101–69	6–2	Tad Smith Coliseum; Oxford, Mississippi
December 18*; 3:00 pm		East Tennessee State	W 71–50	7–2	Tad Smith Coliseum; Oxford, Mississippi
December 22*; 5:00 pm		vs. Texas State; Cancún Governor's Cup first round	W 83–72	8–2	Polifórum Benito Juárez; Cancún, Mexico
December 23*; 8:00 pm, ESPNU		vs. Colorado State; Cancún Governor's Cup semi-finals	L 61–68	8–3	Poliforum Benito Juárez; Cancún, Mexico
December 24*; 7:00 pm, ESPN2		vs. Saint Louis; Cancún Governor's Cup 3rd place game	W 69–61	9–3	Poliforum Benito Juárez; Cancún, Mexico
December 30*; 3:00 pm, FSN		Alcorn State	W 100–62	10–3	Tad Smith Coliseum; Oxford, Mississippi
January 2*; 5:00 pm, CSS		Southeastern Louisiana	W 68–59	11–3	Tad Smith Coliseum; Oxford, Mississippi
January 5*; 8:00 pm		at SMU	W 75–57	12–3	Moody Coliseum; Dallas, Texas
SEC regular season
January 8; 8:00 pm, CSS		at Florida	L 71–77	12–4 (0–1)	O'Connell Center; Gainesville, Florida
January 13; 5:00 pm, ESPN2		Mississippi State	L 64–69	12–5 (0–2)	Tad Smith Coliseum; Oxford, Mississippi
January 15; 8:00 pm, FSN		Georgia	L 76–98	12–6 (0–3)	Tad Smith Coliseum; Oxford, Mississippi
January 19; 9:00 pm, CSS		at Vanderbilt	L 74–84	12–7 (0–4)	Memorial Gym; Nashville, Tennessee
January 22; 1:30 pm, SEC Network		at LSU	W 78–51	13–7 (1–4)	Pete Maravich Assembly Center; Baton Rouge, Louisiana
January 29; 4:00 pm, SEC Network		Tennessee	L 57–74	13–8 (1–5)	Tad Smith Coliseum; Oxford, Mississippi
February 1; 7:00 pm, ESPNU		No. 10 Kentucky	W 71–69	14–8 (2–5)	Tad Smith Coliseum; Oxford, Mississippi
February 5; 6:00 pm, ESPN2		at Arkansas	W 69–60	15–8 (3–5)	Bud Walton Arena; Fayetteville, Arkansas
February 9; 9:00 pm, CSS		LSU	W 66–60	16–8 (4–5)	Tad Smith Coliseum; Oxford, Mississippi
February 12; 4:00 pm, SEC Network		at Alabama	L 64–74	16–9 (4–6)	Coleman Coliseum; Tuscaloosa, Alabama
February 16; 8:00 pm, SEC Network		Auburn	W 90–59	17–9 (5–6)	Tad Smith Coliseum; Oxford, Mississippi
February 19; 1:30 pm, SEC Network		at Mississippi State	L 58–71	17–10 (5–7)	Humphrey Coliseum; Starkville, Mississippi
February 22; 7:00 pm, ESPNU		at South Carolina	L 73–79	17–11 (5–8)	Colonial Life Arena; Columbia, South Carolina
February 26; 4:00 pm, SEC Network		Alabama	W 68–63	18–11 (6–8)	Tad Smith Coliseum; Oxford, Mississippi
March 2; 8:00 pm, SEC Network		at Auburn	L 73–76	18–12 (6–9)	Auburn Arena; Auburn, Alabama
March 5; 4:00 pm, SEC Network		Arkansas	W 84–74	19–12 (7–9)	Tad Smith Coliseum; Oxford, Mississippi
2011 SEC tournament
March 10; 3:30 pm, SEC Network	(W3)	vs. (E6) South Carolina; SEC First Round	W 66–55	20–12	Georgia Dome; Atlanta
March 11; 3:30 pm, SEC Network	(W3)	vs. (E2) No. 15 Kentucky; SEC Quarterfinals	L 66–75	20–13	Georgia Dome; Atlanta
NIT
March 16*; 9:00 pm, ESPN2	(5 C)	at (4 C) California; NIT First Round	L 74–77	20–14	Haas Pavilion; Berkeley, California
*Non-conference game. ^{#}Rankings from AP Poll. (#) Tournament seedings in parentheses. C=NIT Colorado bracket.
