= 2010–11 LSU Tigers basketball team =

American college basketball season

2010–11 LSU Tigers men's basketball
- Conference: Southeastern Conference
- West
- Record: 11–21 (3–13 SEC)
- Head coach: Trent Johnson (3rd season)
- Assistant coaches: Donny Guerinoni (3rd season); Brent Scott (3rd season); Lynn Nance (1st season)
- Home arena: Pete Maravich Assembly Center

2010–11 Southeastern Conference men's basketball standings
	Conf.				Overall
Team	W		L	PCT	W		L	PCT
East
No. 15 Florida	13	–	3	.813	29	–	8	.784
No. 11 Kentucky †	10	–	6	.625	29	–	9	.763
No. 25 Vanderbilt	9	–	7	.563	23	–	11	.676
Georgia	9	–	7	.563	21	–	12	.636
Tennessee	8	–	8	.500	19	–	15	.559
South Carolina	5	–	11	.313	14	–	16	.467
West
Alabama	12	–	4	.750	25	–	12	.676
Mississippi State	9	–	7	.563	17	–	14	.548
Ole Miss	7	–	9	.438	20	–	14	.588
Arkansas	7	–	9	.438	18	–	13	.581
Auburn	4	–	12	.250	11	–	20	.355
LSU	3	–	13	.188	11	–	21	.344
† 2011 SEC tournament winner As of April 2, 2011; Rankings from AP Poll

The 2010–11 LSU Tigers basketball team represented LSU during the 2010–11 NCAA Division I men's basketball season. The Tigers, led by 3rd-year head coach Trent Johnson, played their home games at the Pete Maravich Assembly Center and were members of the Southeastern Conference. They finished the season 11–21 and 3–13 in SEC play to finish last in the West division. They lost to Vanderbilt in the first round of the SEC Basketball tournament.

== Previous season ==
The Tigers finished the 2009–10 season 11–20 overall and 2–14 in SEC play. They were not invited to either the NCAA tournament or the NIT.

== Roster ==
2010–11 LSU Tigers men's basketball team
Players
Coaches

Pos.	#	Name	Height	Weight	Year	Hometown
F	3	Garrett Green	6 ft 11 in (2.11 m)	230 lb (104 kg)	Jr	Woodland Hills, California
G	4	Chris Bass	6 ft 1 in (1.85 m)	185 lb (84 kg)	Jr	Baton Rouge, Louisiana
F	5	Malcolm White	6 ft 9 in (2.06 m)	225 lb (102 kg)	Sr	Baton Rouge, Louisiana
G	10	Andre Stringer	5 ft 9 in (1.75 m)	170 lb (77 kg)	Fr	Jackson, Mississippi
F	13	Eddie Ludwig	6 ft 9 in (2.06 m)	215 lb (98 kg)	So	Metairie, Louisiana
F	14	Jalen Courtney	6 ft 8 in (2.03 m)	210 lb (95 kg)	Fr	Jackson, Mississippi
F	15	Dennis Harris	6 ft 11 in (2.11 m)	190 lb (86 kg)	So	Jonesboro, Georgia
F	21	Matt Derenbecker	6 ft 7 in (2.01 m)	185 lb (84 kg)	Fr	Metairie, Louisiana
G	22	Ralston Turner	6 ft 6 in (1.98 m)	193 lb (88 kg)	Fr	Muscle Shoals, Alabama
G	24	Daron Populist	5 ft 10 in (1.78 m)	170 lb (77 kg)	So	Slidell, Louisiana
C	41	Justin Hamilton	6 ft 11 in (2.11 m)	260 lb (118 kg)	Jr	Alpine, Utah
G	45	Aaron Dotson	6 ft 4 in (1.93 m)	205 lb (93 kg)	So	Seattle, Washington
C	55	Andrew Del Pierro	7 ft 2 in (2.18 m)	286 lb (130 kg)	So	Austin, Texas

Head coach

- Trent Johnson (Boise State)

Assistant coach(es)

- Donny Guerinoni (Nevada)
- Lynn Nance (Washington)
- Brent Scott (Rice)

Legend

- (C) Team captain
- (S) Suspended
- (I) Ineligible
- (W) Walk-on
- Injured
- Current redshirt

Roster
Last update: 2009-11-11

== Schedule and results ==
Date time, TV	Rank^{#}	Opponent^{#}	Result	Record	High points	High rebounds	High assists	Site (attendance) city, state
Non-conference regular season
November 12, 2010*; 8:00 p.m.		Northwestern State	W 87–78	1–0	21 – Tied	6 – Green	5 – Stringer	Pete Maravich Assembly Center (7,842); Baton Rouge, LA
November 16, 2010*; 8:00 p.m.		Nicholls	L 53–62	1–1	14 – Tied	14 – Warren	3 – Stringer	Pete Maravich Assembly Center (6,913); Baton Rouge, LA
November 18, 2010*; 8:00 p.m.		UT Martin	W 79–56	2–1	15 – Stringer	15 – White	5 – Bass	Pete Maravich Assembly Center (6,607); Baton Rouge, LA
November 21, 2010*; 5:00 p.m., CBS SS		vs. No. 19 Memphis	L 61–70	2–2	13 – Stringer	8 – Ludwig	4 – Tied	BancorpSouth Arena (7,941); Tupelo, MS
November 24, 2010*; 8:00 p.m.		Centenary	W 78–36	3–2	16 – Stringer	9 – Green	4 – Tied	Pete Maravich Assembly Center (6,742); Baton Rouge, LA
November 28, 2010*; 4:00 p.m.		at South Alabama	W 80–65	4–2	21 – Stringer	5 – Green	4 – Tied	Mitchell Center (3,653); Mobile, AL
November 30, 2010*; 8:00 p.m.		Houston	L 57–80	5–2	15 – Turner	11 – Warren	5 – Turner	Pete Maravich Assembly Center (6,688); Baton Rouge, LA
December 11, 2010*; 8:00 p.m.		Central Michigan	W 59–55	6–2	12 – White	7 – Turner	4 – Tied	Pete Maravich Assembly Center (6,898); Baton Rouge, LA
December 13, 2010*; 8:00 p.m.		Coastal Carolina	L 69–78 ^{OT}	6–3	16 – Stringer	6 – Turner	5 – Stringer	Pete Maravich Assembly Center (6,425); Baton Rouge, LA
December 16, 2010*; 8:00 p.m.		McNeese State	W 78–66 ^{OT}	7–3	23 – Turner	9 – White	5 – Stringer	Pete Maravich Assembly Center (6,445); Baton Rouge, LA
December 18, 2010*; 8:00 p.m.		vs. Wichita State	L 69–70	7–4	21 – Turner	13 – Green	2 – Tied	CenturyTel Center (2,165); Bossier City, LA
December 22, 2010*; 8:00 p.m.		North Texas	L 55–75	7–5	12 – White	9 – Warren	4 – Bass	Pete Maravich Assembly Center (7,017); Baton Rouge, LA
December 27, 2010*; 7:00 p.m.		Southern	W 62–41	8–5	16 – White	11 – White	4 – Stringer	Pete Maravich Assembly Center (6,739); Baton Rouge, LA
December 29, 2010*; 8:00 p.m.		at Rice	L 68–74	8–6	19 – Stringer	9 – Warren	8 – Bass	Tudor Fieldhouse (3,358); Houston, TX
January 2, 2011*; 5:30 p.m., FSN		at Virginia	L 50–64	8–7	12 – Green	6 – White	2 – Bass	John Paul Jones Arena (10,049); Charlottesville, VA
SEC regular season
January 8, 2011; 6:00 p.m., FSN		at Auburn	W 62–55	9–7 (1–0)	18 – Green	8 – Derenbecker	4 – Bass	Neville Arena (6,873); Auburn, AL
January 12, 2011; 8:00 p.m., SEC Network		Arkansas	W 56–53	10–7 (2–0)	13 – White	10 – Green	7 – Stringer	Pete Maravich Assembly Center (7,023); Baton Rouge, LA
January 15, 2011; 4:00 p.m., SEC Network		at No. 13 Kentucky	L 44–82	10–8 (2–1)	13 – Green	9 – Green	4 – Bass	Rupp Arena (24,330); Lexington, KY
January 22, 2011; 1:45 p.m., SEC Network		Ole Miss	L 51–78	10–9 (2–2)	14 – Derenbecker	5 – Derenbecker	3 – Dotson	Pete Maravich Assembly Center (8,060); Baton Rouge, LA
January 26, 2011; 8:00 p.m., SEC Network		at Tennessee	L 53–75	10–10 (2–3)	13 – Derenbecker	10 – White	3 – Tied	Thompson–Boling Arena (18,991); Knoxville, TN
January 29, 2011; 8:00 p.m.		at Alabama	L 46–70	10–11 (2–4)	13 – Stringer	7 – Ludwig	2 – Tied	Coleman Coliseum (15,383); Tuscaloosa, AL
February 2, 2011; 8:00 p.m., SEC Network		South Carolina	L 56–64	10–12 (2–5)	19 – Stringer	9 – Green	2 – Tied	Pete Maravich Assembly Center (7,311); Baton Rouge, LA
February 5, 2011; 4:00 p.m., SEC Network		Mississippi State	L 57–58	10–13 (2–6)	15 – Stringer	9 – White	4 – Stringer	Pete Maravich Assembly Center (7,938); Baton Rouge, LA
February 9, 2011; 9:00 p.m., CSS		at Ole Miss	L 60–66	10–14 (2–7)	19 – Derenbecker	11 – White	5 – Stringer	Tad Smith Coliseum (2,112); Oxford, MS
February 12, 2011; 1:47 p.m., SEC Network		at Arkansas	L 61–80	10–15 (2–8)	13 – Derenbecker	5 – Warren	4 – Stringer	Bud Walton Arena (12,933); Fayetteville, AR
February 17, 2011; 9:00 p.m.		Alabama	L 56–67	10–16 (2–9)	17 – Turner	8 – Warren	2 – Tied	Pete Maravich Assembly Center (7,830); Baton Rouge, LA
February 20, 2011; 1:00 p.m., ESPN		No. 14 Florida	L 61–68	10–17 (2–10)	18 – Turner	6 – White	4 – Turner	Pete Maravich Assembly Center (7,711); Baton Rouge, LA
February 23, 2011; 9:00 p.m., CSS		at Mississippi State	W 84–82	11–17 (3–10)	16 – Dotson	8 – Green	3 – Turner	Humphrey Coliseum (7,303); Starkville, MS
February 26, 2011; 1:45 p.m., SEC Network		No. 18 Vanderbilt	L 69–90	11–18 (3–11)	24 – Warren	8 – Warren	6 – Bass	Pete Maravich Assembly Center (7,703); Baton Rouge, LA
March 2, 2011; 8:00 p.m., SEC Network		at Georgia	L 53–73	11–19 (3–12)	18 – Turner	6 – Warren	2 – Dotson	Stegeman Coliseum (8,642); Athens, GA
March 5, 2011; 7:00 p.m., FSN		Auburn	L 51–60	11–20 (3–13)	14 – Warren	6 – Warren	4 – Bass	Pete Maravich Assembly Center (6,857); Baton Rouge, LA
SEC Tournament
March 10, 2011; 10:09 p.m., SEC Network	(W6)	vs. (E3) Vanderbilt; SEC First Round	L 50–62	11–21	13 – Stringer	8 – Ludwig	3 – Derenbecker	Georgia Dome (15,145); Atlanta, GA
*Non-conference game. ^{#}Rankings from AP Poll. (#) Tournament seedings in parentheses. All times are in Central Time.

Schedule Source
