= 2010–11 South Carolina Gamecocks men's basketball team =

American college basketball season

2010–11 South Carolina Gamecocks men's basketball
- Conference: Southeastern Conference
- East
- Record: 14–16 (5–11 SEC)
- Head coach: Darrin Horn (3rd season)
- Assistant coaches: Neill Berry; Mike Boynton Jr.; Cypheus Bunton
- Home arena: Colonial Life Arena

2010–11 Southeastern Conference men's basketball standings
	Conf.				Overall
Team	W		L	PCT	W		L	PCT
East
No. 15 Florida	13	–	3	.813	29	–	8	.784
No. 11 Kentucky †	10	–	6	.625	29	–	9	.763
No. 25 Vanderbilt	9	–	7	.563	23	–	11	.676
Georgia	9	–	7	.563	21	–	12	.636
Tennessee	8	–	8	.500	19	–	15	.559
South Carolina	5	–	11	.313	14	–	16	.467
West
Alabama	12	–	4	.750	25	–	12	.676
Mississippi State	9	–	7	.563	17	–	14	.548
Ole Miss	7	–	9	.438	20	–	14	.588
Arkansas	7	–	9	.438	18	–	13	.581
Auburn	4	–	12	.250	11	–	20	.355
LSU	3	–	13	.188	11	–	21	.344
† 2011 SEC tournament winner As of April 2, 2011; Rankings from AP Poll

The 2010–11 South Carolina Gamecocks men's basketball team represented the University of South Carolina in the 2010-11 college basketball season. Their head coach was Darrin Horn, in his third season with the Gamecocks. The team played its home games at the Colonial Life Arena in Columbia, South Carolina, as a member of the Southeastern Conference.

== Previous season ==
The Gamecocks finished the 2009–10 season 15–16 overall, 6–10 in SEC play and lost in the first round of the SEC tournament to Ole Miss.

== Roster ==
No.	Name	Position	Ht.	Wt.	Year	Hometown/High School
1	Stephen Spinella	G	6–4	201	So.	Colts Neck, New Jersey / Apex Academy
2	Brian Richardson	G	6–4	164	Fr.	Wilson, North Carolina / Greenfield School
5	Eric Smith	G	5–11	211	Fr.	Mullins, South Carolina / Christ School
12	Ramon Galloway	G	6–2	176	So.	Philadelphia, Pennsylvania / Dwyer High School
15	Malik Cooke	F	6–6	213	RS Jr.	Charlotte, North Carolina / Christ School
23	Bruce Ellington	G	5–9	197	Fr.	Moncks Corner, South Carolina / Berkeley High School
24	Damontre Harris	F	6–9	214	Fr.	Fayetteville, North Carolina / Trinity Christian High School
30	Lakeem Jackson	SF	6–5	230	So.	Charlotte, North Carolina / Christ School
31	Murphy Holloway	F	6–7	234	Jr.	Irmo, South Carolina / Dutch Fork High School
32	Johndre Jefferson	F	6–9	215	Sr.	Santee, South Carolina / Northwest Florida State College
33	RJ Slawson	F	6–8	196	Fr.	Charleston, South Carolina / Fort Dorchester High School
44	Sam Muldrow	F	6–9	229	Sr.	Florence, South Carolina / Wilson High School
45	Carlton Geathers	F	6–10	256	Fr.	Georgetown, South Carolina / Carvers Bay High School

== Schedule and results ==
Date time, TV	Rank^{#}	Opponent^{#}	Result	Record	Site (attendance) city, state
Non-conference regular season
11/12/2010*; 6:30pm, FSC		Elon	W 94–79	1–0	Colonial Life Arena (12,408); Columbia, SC
11/16/2010*; 7:00pm, ESPN		at No. 2 Michigan State	L 73–82	1–1	Breslin Center (14,797); East Lansing, MI
11/19/2010*; 7:00pm, FSC		Radford	W 85–56	2–1	Colonial Life Arena (10,017); Columbia, SC
11/23/2010*; 1:00pm, FSC		USC Upstate	W 57–41	3–1	Colonial Life Arena (8,643); Columbia, SC
11/27/2010*; 7:00pm, HSN		at Western Kentucky	W 87–85 ^{2OT}	4–1	E.A. Diddle Arena (6,012); Bowling Green, KY
12/01/2010*; 7:30pm, FSC		Delaware State	W 74–61	5–1	Colonial Life Arena (9,207); Columbia, SC
12/05/2010*; 7:15pm, Fox		Clemson	W 64–60	6–1	Colonial Life Arena (10,177); Columbia, SC
12/11/2010*; 6:00pm		Wofford	W 64–53	7–1	Colonial Life Arena (8,813); Columbia, SC
12/18/2010*; 5:15pm, CBS		at No. 2 Ohio State	L 57–79	7–2	Value City Arena (15,497); Columbus, OH
12/22/2010*; 7:00pm		at Furman	L 75–91	7–3	Timmons Arena (2,717); Greenville, SC
12/29/2010*; 4:00pm, FSC		Jacksonville State	W 56–49	8–3	Colonial Life Arena (8,713); Columbia, SC
1/01/2011*; 7:30pm, ESPNU		Boston College	L 70–85	8–4	Colonial Life Arena (8,658); Columbia, SC
1/04/2011*; 7:30pm, FSC		South Carolina State	W 91–56	9–4	Colonial Life Arena (8,631); Columbia, SC
SEC regular season
1/08/2011; 6:30pm, ESPN2		No. 22 Vanderbilt	W 83–75 ^{OT}	10–4 (1–0)	Colonial Life Arena (10,439); Columbia, SC
1/12/2011; 6:00pm, CSS		at Alabama	L 47–57	10–5 (1–1)	Coleman Coliseum (11,572); Tuscaloosa, AL
1/15/2011; 7:00 p.m., SEC		at Florida	W 72–69	11–5 (2–1)	O'Connell Center (12,158); Gainesville, FL
1/19/2011; 7:00 p.m., SEC		Arkansas	W 81–74 ^{OT}	12–5 (3–1)	Colonial Life Arena (11,005); Columbia, SC
1/22/2011; 8:00pm, ESPN		No. 12 Kentucky	L 58–67	12–6 (3–2)	Colonial Life Arena (18,000); Columbia, SC
1/29/2011; 9:00pm, SEC		Auburn	L 64–79	12–7 (3–3)	Colonial Life Arena (10,281); Columbia, SC
2/02/2011; 3:00pm, SEC		LSU	W 64–56	13–7 (4–3)	Pete Maravich Assembly Center (7,311); Baton Rouge, LA
02/05/2011; 9:00pm, SEC		at No. 23 Vanderbilt	L 60–78	13–8 (4–4)	Memorial Gymnasium (14,316); Nashville, TN
2/09/2011; 6:00pm, SEC		No. 17 Florida	L 60–79	13–9 (4–5)	Colonial Life Arena (10,525); Columbia, SC
2/12/2011; 6:30pm, SEC		Georgia	L 56–60	13–10 (4–6)	Colonial Life Arena (11,835); Columbia, SC
2/16/2011; 4:00pm, CSS		at Tennessee	L 67–73	13–11 (4–7)	Assembly Hall (18,402); Knoxville, TN
2/19/2011; 7:00pm, SEC		at No. 22 Kentucky	L 59–90	13–12 (4–8)	Rupp Arena (24,338); Lexington, KY
2/22/2011; 4:00pm, SEC		Ole Miss	W 79–73	14–12 (5–8)	Colonial Life Arena (9,765); Columbia, SC
2/26/2011; 7:00pm, CSS		at Georgia	L 48–64	14–13 (5–9)	Stegeman Coliseum (10,355); Athens, GA
3/03/2011; 8:30pm, ESPN		Tennessee	L 69–73	14–14 (5–10)	Colonial Life Arena (10,137); Columbia, SC
3/05/2011; 4:00pm, ESPN		at Mississippi State	L 58–60	14–15 (5–11)	Humphrey Coliseum (7,955); Starkville, MS
SEC tournament
3/10/2011; 3:30pm, SEC	(E6)	at (W3) Ole Miss; SEC First Round	L 55–66	14–16	Georgia Dome (12,144); Atlanta, GA
*Non-conference game. ^{#}Rankings from AP Poll. (#) Tournament seedings in parentheses.
