= 2010–11 Georgia Bulldogs basketball team =

American college basketball season

2010–11 Georgia Bulldogs men's basketball

NCAA tournament, Round of 64
- Conference: Southeastern Conference
- Eastern
- Record: 21–12 (9–7 SEC)
- Head coach: Mark Fox (2nd season)
- Home arena: Stegeman Coliseum

2010–11 Southeastern Conference men's basketball standings
	Conf.				Overall
Team	W		L	PCT	W		L	PCT
East
No. 15 Florida	13	–	3	.813	29	–	8	.784
No. 11 Kentucky †	10	–	6	.625	29	–	9	.763
No. 25 Vanderbilt	9	–	7	.563	23	–	11	.676
Georgia	9	–	7	.563	21	–	12	.636
Tennessee	8	–	8	.500	19	–	15	.559
South Carolina	5	–	11	.313	14	–	16	.467
West
Alabama	12	–	4	.750	25	–	12	.676
Mississippi State	9	–	7	.563	17	–	14	.548
Ole Miss	7	–	9	.438	20	–	14	.588
Arkansas	7	–	9	.438	18	–	13	.581
Auburn	4	–	12	.250	11	–	20	.355
LSU	3	–	13	.188	11	–	21	.344
† 2011 SEC tournament winner As of April 2, 2011; Rankings from AP Poll

The 2010–11 Georgia Bulldogs men's basketball team represented the University of Georgia during the college basketball season of 2010–2011. The team's head coach was Mark Fox, in his second season at UGA. They played their home games at Stegeman Coliseum and were members of the Southeastern Conference. They finished the season 21–12, 9–7 in SEC play and lost in the quarterfinals of the 2011 SEC men's basketball tournament to Alabama. They received an at-large bid to the 2011 NCAA Division I men's basketball tournament, where they lost in the second round to Washington.

== Roster ==
2010–11 Georgia Bulldogs men's basketball team
Players
Coaches

Pos.	#	Name	Height	Weight	Year	Hometown
G	1	Travis Leslie	6 ft 4 in (1.93 m)	210 lb (95 kg)	Jr	Decatur, Georgia
F	2	Marcus Thornton	6 ft 7 in (2.01 m)	235 lb (107 kg)	Fr	Atlanta, Georgia
G	3	Dustin Ware	5 ft 11 in (1.8 m)	185 lb (84 kg)	Jr	Powder Springs, Georgia
F	4	Chris Barnes	6 ft 8 in (2.03 m)	240 lb (109 kg)	Sr	Riverdale, Georgia
G	11	Vincent Williams	6 ft 1 in (1.85 m)	160 lb (73 kg)	So	Homestead, Florida
G	12	Matt Bucklin	6 ft 0 in (1.83 m)	170 lb (77 kg)	Jr	Marietta, Georgia
F	15	Donte' Williams	6 ft 9 in (2.06 m)	210 lb (95 kg)	Fr	Lithonia, Georgia
F	20	Connor Nolte	6 ft 7 in (2.01 m)	200 lb (91 kg)	RS Sr	Atlanta, Georgia
G	22	Gerald Robinson, Jr.	6 ft 1 in (1.85 m)	170 lb (77 kg)	RS Jr	Nashville, Tennessee
G	23	Sherrard Brantley	6 ft 2 in (1.88 m)	180 lb (82 kg)	So	Dublin, Georgia
F	33	Trey Thompkins	6 ft 10 in (2.08 m)	250 lb (113 kg)	Jr	Lithonia, Georgia
F	50	Jeremy Price	6 ft 8 in (2.03 m)	265 lb (120 kg)	Sr	Decatur, Georgia

Head coach

- Mark Fox (Eastern New Mexico)

Assistant coach(es)

- Kwanza Johnson (Tulsa)
- Stacey Palmore (Livingstone College)
- Philip Pearson (Alabama)

Legend

- (C) Team captain
- (S) Suspended
- (I) Ineligible
- (W) Walk-on
- Injured
- Current redshirt

== Class of 2011 commitments ==
College recruiting
Name	Hometown	School	Height	Weight	Commit date
Kentavious Caldwell-Pope; G	Greenville, Georgia	Greenville	6 ft 6 in (1.98 m)	185 lb (84 kg)	Jul 17, 2010
Kentavious Caldwell-Pope; G	Recruit ratings: Scout: Rivals: (97)				
Tim Dixon; C	Oldsmar, FL	Oldsmar Christian	6 ft 10 in (2.08 m)	215 lb (98 kg)	Sep 19, 2010
Tim Dixon; C	Recruit ratings: Scout: Rivals: (88)				
Overall recruit ranking:
Note: In many cases, Scout, Rivals, 247Sports, On3, and ESPN may conflict in their listings of height and weight.; In these cases, the average was taken. ESPN grades are on a 100-point scale.; Sources: "Georgia 2011 Basketball Commitments". Rivals.; "2011 Georgia Basketball Commits". Scout.; "ESPN". ESPN.; "Scout.com Team Recruiting Rankings". Scout.; "2011 Team Ranking". Rivals.

== Schedule ==
Date time, TV	Rank^{#}	Opponent^{#}	Result	Record	Site (attendance) city, state
Exhibition
November 4*; 7:00 pm, CSS		Augusta State	W 85–48	—	Stegeman Coliseum; Athens, GA
Regular season
November 12*; 7:30 pm, CSS		Mississippi Valley State	W 72–70	1–0	Stegeman Coliseum (6,728); Athens, GA
November 16*; 7:30 pm, FSN		Colorado	W 83–74	2–0	Stegeman Coliseum (6,406); Athens, GA
November 20*; 8:00 pm		at Saint Louis	W 61–59	3–0	Chaifetz Arena (7,192); St. Louis, MO
November 25*; 7:00 pm, ESPN2		vs. Notre Dame; Old Spice Classic – First round	L 83–89 ^{OT}	3–1	HP Field House (2,973); Orlando, FL
November 26*; 7:30 pm, ESPNU		vs. No. 20 Temple; Old Spice Classic – Consolation round	L 58–65	3–2	HP Field House (2,932); Orlando, FL
November 28*; 7:30 pm, ESPNU		vs. Manhattan; Old Spice Classic – 7th place game	W 61–58	4–2	HP Field House (3,428); Orlando, FL
December 3*; 7:00 pm, FSN		UAB	W 66–64	5–2	Stegeman Coliseum (7,253); Athens, GA
December 7*; 7:00 pm, ESPN2		at Georgia Tech; Clean, Old-Fashioned Hate	W 73–72	6–2	Alexander Memorial Coliseum (6,725); Atlanta, GA
December 18*; 12:00 pm, CSS		Arkansas State	W 68–59	7–2	Stegeman Coliseum (6,157); Athens, GA
December 21*; 7:00 pm, CSS		High Point	W 85–38	8–2	Stegeman Coliseum (5,568); Athens, GA
December 23*; 7:00 pm, CSS		at Mercer	W 56–53	9–2	University Center (3,274); Macon, GA
December 28*; 7:00 pm, CSS		Charleston Southern	W 70–55	10–2	Stegeman Coliseum (6,406); Athens, GA
December 31*; 7:00 pm, FSN		Eastern Kentucky	W 64–57	11–2	Stegeman Coliseum (5,645); Athens, GA
January 8; 4:00 pm, SEC Network		No. 11 Kentucky	W 77–70	12–2 (1–0)	Stegeman Coliseum (10,523); Athens, GA
January 12; 8:00 pm, SEC Network	No. 24	at Vanderbilt	L 66–73	12–3 (1–1)	Memorial Gymnasium (14,316); Nashville, TN
January 15; 5:00 pm, FSN	No. 24	at Ole Miss	W 98–76	13–3 (2–1)	Tad Smith Coliseum (7,085); Oxford, MS
January 18; 7:00 pm, ESPNU		Tennessee	L 57–59	13–4 (2–2)	Stegeman Coliseum (10,523); Athens, GA
January 22; 4:00 pm, SEC Network		Mississippi State	W 86–64	14–4 (3–2)	Stegeman Coliseum (10,523); Athens, GA
January 25; 7:00 pm, ESPN		No. 24 Florida; Super Tuesday	L 91–104 ^{2OT}	14–5 (3–3)	Stegeman Coliseum (10,523); Athens, GA
January 29; 4:00 pm, ESPN		at No. 14 Kentucky	L 60–66	14–6 (3–4)	Rupp Arena (24,352); Lexington, KY
February 2; 9:00 pm, CSS		at Arkansas	W 60–59	15–6 (4–4)	Bud Walton Arena (13,560); Fayetteville, AR
February 5; 1:30 pm, SEC Network		Auburn	W 81–72 ^{OT}	16–6 (5–4)	Stegeman Coliseum (10,177); Athens, GA
February 8*; 7:00 pm, ESPNU		Xavier	L 57–65	16–7	Stegeman Coliseum (7,627); Athens, GA
February 12; 4:00 pm, SEC Network		at South Carolina	W 60–56	17–7 (6–4)	Colonial Life Arena (11,835); Columbia, SC
February 16; 7:00 pm, ESPNU		No. 18 Vanderbilt	L 56–64	17–8 (6–5)	Stegeman Coliseum (8,942); Athens, GA
February 19; 1:00 pm, CBS		at Tennessee	W 69–63	18–8 (7–5)	Thompson-Boling Arena (20,462); Knoxville, TN
February 24; 7:00 pm, ESPN		at No. 13 Florida	L 62–71	18–9 (7–6)	O'Connell Center (12,013); Gainesville, FL
February 26; 7:00 pm, FSN		South Carolina	W 64–48	19–9 (8–6)	Stegeman Coliseum (10,355); Athens, GA
March 2; 8:00 pm, SEC Network		LSU	W 73–53	20–9 (9–6)	Stegeman Coliseum (8,642); Athens, GA
March 5; 1:30 pm, SEC Network		at Alabama	L 57–65	20–10 (9–7)	Coleman Coliseum (15,383); Tuscaloosa, AL
2011 SEC tournament
March 10; 1:00 pm, SEC Network	(E4)	vs. (W5) Auburn; SEC First Round	W 69–51	21–10	Georgia Dome (12,144); Atlanta, GA
March 11; 1:00 pm, SEC Network	(E4)	vs. (W1) Alabama; Quarterfinals	L 59–65 ^{OT}	21–11	Georgia Dome (21,875); Atlanta, GA
2011 NCAA tournament
March 18*; 9:45 pm, CBS	(10 E)	vs. (7 E) No. 23 Washington; NCAA Second Round	L 65–68	21–12	Time Warner Cable Arena (16,852); Charlotte, NC
*Non-conference game. ^{#}Rankings from AP Poll. (#) Tournament seedings in parentheses. E=NCAA East Regional.

== Rankings ==
When the Bulldogs were ranked 24th in the AP Poll in January 2011, it was the first time that the team had been nationally ranked since the 2002–03 season.

Ranking movement Legend: ██ Increase in ranking. ██ Decrease in ranking. ██ Not ranked the previous week.
Poll	Pre	Wk 1	Wk 2	Wk 3	Wk 4	Wk 5	Wk 6	Wk 7	Wk 8	Wk 9	Wk 10	Wk 11	Wk 12	Wk 13	Wk 14	Wk 15	Wk 16	Wk 17	Wk 18	Final
AP	—	—	—	—	—	—	—	—	—	24										
Coaches	—	—	—	—	—	—	—	—	—	—										
