= 2010–11 Vanderbilt Commodores men's basketball team =

American college basketball season

2010–11 Vanderbilt Commodores men's basketball

NCAA tournament, Round of 64
- Conference: Southeastern Conference

Ranking
- AP: No. 25
- Record: 23–11 (9–7 SEC)
- Head coach: Kevin Stallings
- Assistant coaches: Brad Frederick; Dan Muller; King Rice
- Home arena: Memorial Gymnasium

2010–11 Southeastern Conference men's basketball standings
	Conf.				Overall
Team	W		L	PCT	W		L	PCT
East
No. 15 Florida	13	–	3	.813	29	–	8	.784
No. 11 Kentucky †	10	–	6	.625	29	–	9	.763
No. 25 Vanderbilt	9	–	7	.563	23	–	11	.676
Georgia	9	–	7	.563	21	–	12	.636
Tennessee	8	–	8	.500	19	–	15	.559
South Carolina	5	–	11	.313	14	–	16	.467
West
Alabama	12	–	4	.750	25	–	12	.676
Mississippi State	9	–	7	.563	17	–	14	.548
Ole Miss	7	–	9	.438	20	–	14	.588
Arkansas	7	–	9	.438	18	–	13	.581
Auburn	4	–	12	.250	11	–	20	.355
LSU	3	–	13	.188	11	–	21	.344
† 2011 SEC tournament winner As of April 2, 2011; Rankings from AP Poll

The 2010–2011 Vanderbilt Commodores men's basketball team represented Vanderbilt University during the 2010–11 NCAA Division I men's basketball season. The Commodores, led by twelfth-year head coach Kevin Stallings, played their home games at the Memorial Gymnasium and were members of the Southeastern Conference.

They finished the season 23–11, 9–7 in SEC play and lost in the semifinals of the 2011 SEC men's basketball tournament to Florida. They received an at-large bid to the 2011 NCAA Division I men's basketball tournament. With a second round upset to Richmond, they lost in their first tournament game in their last three tournament appearances.

== Roster ==
Number	Name	Position	Height	Weight	Year	Hometown
1	Brad Tinsley	Guard	6'3"	210	Junior	Oregon City, Oregon
3	Festus Ezeli	Center	6'11"	255	Junior	Benin City, Nigeria
5	Lance Goulbourne	Guard/forward	6'8"	230	Junior	Brooklyn, New York
10	Chris Meriwether	Guard	6'0"	180	Senior	Nashville, Tennessee
11	Kyle Fuller	Guard	6'1"	200	Freshman	Moreno Valley, California
12	Jordan Smart	Guard/forward	6'6"	200	Sophomore	Lexington, Kentucky
14	Aaron Noll	Forward	6'7"	220	Junior	Fort Mitchell, Kentucky
21	Darshawn McClellan	Forward	6'7"	229	Senior	Fresno, California
23	John Jenkins	Guard	6'4"	220	Sophomore	Hendersonville, Tennessee
33	Steve Tchiengang	Forward	6'9"	245	Junior	Douala, Cameroon
35	James Siakam	Forward	6'6"	210	Freshman	Douala, Cameroon
40	Josh Henderson	Center	6'11"	230	Freshman	Roanoke, Virginia
44	Jeffery Taylor	Forward	6'7"	215	Junior	Norrköping, Sweden
45	Rod Odom	Forward	6'8"	215	Freshman	Central Islip, New York
50	Joe Duffy	Forward	6'8"	225	Senior	Charlotte, North Carolina
54	Andre Walker	Forward	6'7"	220	Junior	Flossmoor, Illinois

== Schedule ==
Date time, TV	Rank^{#}	Opponent^{#}	Result	Record	Site (attendance) city, state
Exhibition
11/03/2010*; 7:00 pm		Alabama–Huntsville	W 69–53	—	Memorial Gymnasium (11,439); Nashville, TN
11/08/2010*; 7:00 pm		Southern Indiana	W 77–40	—	Memorial Gymnasium (11,497); Nashville, TN
Regular season
11/12/2010*; 6:00 pm, ESPN2		Presbyterian	W 88–47	1–0	Memorial Gymnasium (13,481); Nashville, TN
11/18/2010*; 1:25 pm, ESPNU		vs. Nebraska; Puerto Rico Tip-Off First Round	W 59–49	2–0	José Miguel Agrelot Coliseum (4,018); San Juan, PR
11/19/2010*; 11:30 am, ESPNU		vs. West Virginia; Puerto Rico Tip-Off Semifinals	L 71–74	2–1	José Miguel Agrelot Coliseum; San Juan, PR
11/21/2010*; 4:30 pm, ESPN2		vs. No. 8 North Carolina; Puerto Rico Tip-Off 3rd Place Game	W 72–65	3–1	José Miguel Agrelot Coliseum; San Juan, PR
11/24/2010*; 7:00 pm		Grambling State	W 92–59	4–1	Memorial Gymnasium (12,270); Nashville, TN
11/27/2010*; 1:00 pm		Appalachian State	W 86–73	5–1	Memorial Gymnasium (13,398); Nashville, TN
12/01/2010*; 8:00 pm, CSS		Western Kentucky	W 82–62	6–1	Memorial Gymnasium (13,577); Nashville, TN
12/04/2010*; 1:00 pm, CSS		Belmont	W 85–76	7–1	Memorial Gymnasium (13,902); Nashville, TN
12/08/2010*; 8:00 pm, ESPNU		at No. 15 Missouri	L 82–85 ^{OT}	7–2	Mizzou Arena (11,168); Columbia, MO
12/18/2010*; 6:00 pm		Southeastern Louisiana	W 85–52	8–2	Memorial Gymnasium (12,632); Nashville, TN
12/21/2010*; 8:00 pm, CSS		at Middle Tennessee	W 72–53	9–2	Murphy Center (6,820); Murfreesboro, TN
12/29/2010*; 8:00 pm, ESPN2	No. 24	Marquette	W 77–76	10–2	Memorial Gymnasium (13,604); Nashville, TN
01/02/2011*; 4:00 pm	No. 24	Davidson	W 80–52	11–2	Memorial Gymnasium (13,106); Nashville, TN
01/08/2010; 4:00 pm	No. 22	at South Carolina	L 75–83 ^{OT}	11–3 (0–1)	Colonial Life Arena (10,439); Columbia, SC
01/12/2010; 7:00 pm, SEC Network		Georgia	W 73–66	12–3 (1–1)	Memorial Gymnasium (14,316); Nashville, TN
01/15/2011; 11:00 am, ESPN		at Tennessee; ESPN College GameDay	L 64–67	12–4 (1–2)	Thompson–Boling Arena (21,198); Knoxville, TN
01/19/2011; 8:15 pm, CSS		Ole Miss	W 84–74	13–4 (2–2)	Memorial Gymnasium (14,134); Nashville, TN
01/22/2011*; 1:00 pm		No. 22 Saint Mary's	W 89–70	14–4	Memorial Gymnasium (14,316); Nashville, TN
01/27/2011; 6:00 pm, ESPN2	No. 19	at Mississippi State	W 81–74	15–4 (3–2)	Humphrey Coliseum (8,870); Starkville, MS
01/29/2011; 5:00 pm, FSN	No. 19	Arkansas	L 78–89	15–5 (3–3)	Memorial Gymnasium (14,316); Nashville, TN
02/01/2011; 8:00 pm, ESPN	No. 23	at Florida	L 61–65 ^{OT}	15–6 (3–4)	O'Connell Center (10,115); Gainesville, FL
02/05/2011; 12:30 pm, SEC Network	No. 23	South Carolina	W 78–60	16–6 (4–4)	Memorial Gymnasium (14,316); Nashville, TN
02/10/2011; 8:00 pm, ESPN2	No. 23	Alabama	W 81–77	17–6 (5–4)	Memorial Gymnasium (14,316); Nashville, TN
02/12/2011; 12:00 pm, CBS	No. 23	No. 18 Kentucky	W 81–77	18–6 (6–4)	Memorial Gymnasium (14,316); Nashville, TN
02/16/2011; 6:00 pm, ESPNU	No. 18	at Georgia	W 64–56	19–6 (7–4)	Stegeman Coliseum (8,942); Athens, GA
02/19/2011; 3:00 pm, SEC Network	No. 18	at Auburn	W 77–60	20–6 (8–4)	Auburn Arena (7,442); Auburn, AL
02/22/2011; 8:00 pm, ESPN	No. 18	Tennessee	L 51–60	20–7 (8–5)	Memorial Gymnasium (14,316); Nashville, TN
02/26/2011; 12:30 pm, SEC Network	No. 18	at LSU	W 90–69	21–7 (9–5)	Pete Maravich Assembly Center (7,703); Baton Rouge, LA
03/01/2011; 8:00 pm, ESPN	No. 21	at No. 20 Kentucky	L 66–68	21–8 (9–6)	Rupp Arena (24,275); Lexington, KY
03/05/2011; 5:00 pm, ESPN	No. 21	No. 14 Florida	L 76–86	21–9 (9–7)	Memorial Gymnasium (14,316); Nashville, TN
SEC tournament
03/10/2011; 10:00 pm, SEC Network	(E3)	vs. (W6) LSU; SEC First Round	W 62–50	22–9	Georgia Dome (15,145); Atlanta, GA
03/11/2011; 10:10 pm, SEC Network	(E3)	vs. (W2) Mississippi State; SEC Quarterfinals	W 87–81	23–9	Georgia Dome (17,096); Atlanta, GA
03/12/2011; 3:30 pm, ABC	(E3)	vs. (E1) No. 12 Florida; SEC Semifinals	L 66–77	23–10	Georgia Dome (21,728); Atlanta, GA
NCAA tournament
03/17/2011*; 3:10 pm, TBS	(5 SW) No. 25	vs. (12 SW) Richmond; NCAA Second Round	L 66–69	23–11	Pepsi Center (18,499); Denver, CO
*Non-conference game. ^{#}Rankings from AP Poll. (#) Tournament seedings in parentheses. All times are in Central Time.
