= 2010–11 Arkansas Razorbacks men's basketball team =

American college basketball season

2010–11 Arkansas Razorbacks men's basketball
- Conference: Southeastern Conference
- Western
- Record: 18–13 (7–9 SEC)
- Head coach: John Pelphrey (4th season)
- Home arena: Bud Walton Arena

2010–11 Southeastern Conference men's basketball standings
	Conf.				Overall
Team	W		L	PCT	W		L	PCT
East
No. 15 Florida	13	–	3	.813	29	–	8	.784
No. 11 Kentucky †	10	–	6	.625	29	–	9	.763
No. 25 Vanderbilt	9	–	7	.563	23	–	11	.676
Georgia	9	–	7	.563	21	–	12	.636
Tennessee	8	–	8	.500	19	–	15	.559
South Carolina	5	–	11	.313	14	–	16	.467
West
Alabama	12	–	4	.750	25	–	12	.676
Mississippi State	9	–	7	.563	17	–	14	.548
Ole Miss	7	–	9	.438	20	–	14	.588
Arkansas	7	–	9	.438	18	–	13	.581
Auburn	4	–	12	.250	11	–	20	.355
LSU	3	–	13	.188	11	–	21	.344
† 2011 SEC tournament winner As of April 2, 2011; Rankings from AP Poll

The 2010–11 Arkansas Razorbacks men's basketball team represented the University of Arkansas during the college basketball season of 2010–11. The team's head coach was John Pelphrey, who entered his fourth and final season. The Razorbacks were defeated by Tennessee in the first round of the SEC tournament.

== Roster ==
2010–11 Arkansas Razorbacks men's basketball team
Players
Coaches

Pos.	#	Name	Height	Weight	Year	Hometown
G	1	Mardracus Wade	6 ft 2 in (1.88 m)	175 lb (79 kg)	Fr	Memphis, Tennessee
G	2	Jemal Farmer	6 ft 5 in (1.96 m)	200 lb (91 kg)	Jr	Chicago, Illinois
G	3	Rickey Scott	6 ft 3 in (1.91 m)	180 lb (82 kg)	Fr	Irving, Texas
F	5	Glenn Bryant	6 ft 7 in (2.01 m)	195 lb (88 kg)	So	Roseville, Michigan
G	11	Nick Mason	5 ft 11 in (1.8 m)	170 lb (77 kg)	Sr	Jonesboro, Arkansas
G	12	Marcus Britt	6 ft 3 in (1.91 m)	198 lb (90 kg)	Sr	Madison, Arkansas
G	15	Rotnei Clarke	6 ft 0 in (1.83 m)	190 lb (86 kg)	Jr	Verdigris, Oklahoma
G	20	Kikko Haydar	5 ft 11 in (1.8 m)	170 lb (77 kg)	Fr	Fayetteville, Arkansas
F	21	Delvon Johnson	6 ft 9 in (2.06 m)	220 lb (100 kg)	Sr	Richton Park, Illinois
F	22	Marvell Waithe	6 ft 9 in (2.06 m)	175 lb (79 kg)	Jr	Toronto, Ontario
G	23	Julysses Nobles	6 ft 1 in (1.85 m)	170 lb (77 kg)	So	Jackson, Mississippi
G	30	Jeff Peterson	6 ft 0 in (1.83 m)	192 lb (87 kg)	RS Jr	Hyattsville, Maryland
F	31	Michael Sanchez	6 ft 8 in (2.03 m)	230 lb (104 kg)	RS Jr	Springdale, Arkansas
F	33	Marshawn Powell	6 ft 7 in (2.01 m)	220 lb (100 kg)	So	Crozet, Virginia

Head coach

- John Pelphrey (Kentucky)

Assistant coach(es)

Legend

- (C) Team captain
- (S) Suspended
- (I) Ineligible
- (W) Walk-on
- Injured
- Current redshirt

== Schedule ==
Date time, TV	Rank^{#}	Opponent^{#}	Result	Record	Site (attendance) city, state
Exhibition
November 6; 7:00 pm		LeMoyne–Owen	W 101–60	—	Bud Walton Arena; Fayetteville, AR
November 11; 2:00 pm		Victory	W 109–74	—	Bud Walton Arena; Fayetteville, AR
Regular Season
November 18*; 7:00 pm		Grambling State	W 75–52	1–0	Bud Walton Arena (11,077); Fayetteville, AR
November 22*; 7:00 pm		Florida Gulf Coast	W 90–47	2–0	Bud Walton Arena (10,778); Fayetteville, AR
November 24*; 7:00 pm		Southeast Missouri State	W 66–56	3–0	Bud Walton Arena (10,636); Fayetteville, AR
November 26*; 7:00 pm		UAB	L 65–70 ^{OT}	3–1	Verizon Arena (9,396); North Little Rock, AR
December 1*; 7:00 pm		Oklahoma	W 84–74	4–1	Bud Walton Arena (11,854); Fayetteville, AR
December 4*; 2:00 pm		Troy	W 75–60	5–1	Bud Walton Arena (10,796); Fayetteville, AR
December 8*; 6:00 pm		vs. Seton Hall	W 71–62	6–1	Freedom Hall (17,404); Louisville, KY
December 15*; 7:00 pm		Mississippi Valley State	W 87–64	7–1	Bud Walton Arena (10,758); Fayetteville, AR
December 18*; 1:00 pm		vs. Texas A&M; The Showcase	L 62–71 ^{OT}	7–2	American Airlines Center (11,077); Dallas, TX
December 22*; 7:00 pm		Texas Southern	W 67–59	8–2	Bud Walton Arena (12,076); Fayetteville, AR
December 29*; 7:00 pm		North Carolina A&T	W 87–59	9–2	Bud Walton Arena (11,578); Fayetteville, AR
December 31*; 7:00 pm		Texas–Arlington	W 87–74	10–2	Bud Walton Arena (11,913); Fayetteville, AR
January 4*; 8:00 pm		at No. 12 Texas	L 46–79	10–3	Frank Erwin Center (11,881); Austin, TX
January 8; 1:30 pm, SEC Network		Tennessee	W 68–65	11–3 (1–0)	Bud Walton Arena (12,044); Fayetteville, AR
January 12; 8:00 pm, SEC Network		at LSU	L 53–56	11–4 (1–1)	Pete Maravich Assembly Center (7,023); Baton Rouge, LA
January 15; 1:30 pm, SEC Network		Alabama	W 70–65	12–4 (2–1)	Bud Walton Arena (13,033); Fayetteville, AR
January 19; 8:00, SEC Network		at South Carolina	L 74–81 ^{OT}	12–5 (2–2)	Colonial Life Arena (11,005); Columbia, SC
January 22; 8:00 pm, FSN		at Florida	L 43–75	12–6 (2–3)	O'Connell Center (11,184); Gainesville, FL
January 25; 9:00 pm, ESPNU		Auburn	W 73–64	13–6 (3–3)	Bud Walton Arena (12,626); Fayetteville, AR
January 29; 6:00 pm, FSN		at No. 19 Vanderbilt	W 89–78	14–6 (4–3)	Memorial Gymnasium (14,316); Nashville, TN
February 2; 9:00 pm, CSS		Georgia	L 59–60	14–7 (4–4)	Bud Walton Arena (13,560); Fayetteville, AR
February 5; 6:00 pm, ESPN		Ole Miss	L 60–69	14–8 (4–5)	Bud Walton Arena (14,174); Fayetteville, AR
February 9; 8:00 pm, SEC Network		at Mississippi State	L 56–67	14–9 (4–6)	Humphrey Coliseum (7,224); Starkville, MS
February 12; 1:30 pm, SEC Network		LSU	W 80–61	15–9 (5–6)	Bud Walton Arena (12,933); Fayetteville, AR
February 12*; 7:00 pm, RazorVision		Florida A&M	W 94–55	16–9	Bud Walton Arena (10,678); Fayetteville, AR
February 19; 7:00 pm, FSN		at Alabama	L 56–69	16–10 (5–7)	Coleman Coliseum (15,383); Tuscaloosa, AL
February 23; 8:00 pm, SEC Network		No. 22 Kentucky	W 77–76 ^{OT}	17–10 (6–7)	Bud Walton Arena (13,472); Fayetteville, AR
February 26; 1:30 pm, SEC Network		at Auburn	W 57–55	18–10 (7–7)	Auburn Arena (7,206); Auburn, AL
March 2; 9:00 pm, CSS		Mississippi State; Senior Day	L 78–88	18–11 (7–8)	Bud Walton Arena (12,412); Fayetteville, AR
March 5; 4:00 pm, SEC Network		at Ole Miss	L 74–84	18–12 (7–9)	Tad Smith Coliseum (8,053); Oxford, MS
SEC Tournament
March 10; 7:30 pm, SEC Network	(W4)	vs. (E5) Tennessee; SEC First Round	L 68–74	18–13	Georgia Dome (15,145); Atlanta, GA
*Non-conference game. ^{#}Rankings from AP Poll. (#) Tournament seedings in parentheses.
