= 2011 SEC men's basketball tournament =

- Classification: Division I
- Season: 2010–11
- Teams: 12
- Site: Georgia Dome; Atlanta, Georgia
- Champions: Kentucky (28th title)
- Winning coach: John Calipari (2nd title)
- MVP: Darius Miller (Kentucky)
- Attendance: 197,385
- Television: SEC Network, ABC

2010–11 Southeastern Conference men's basketball standings
	Conf.				Overall
Team	W		L	PCT	W		L	PCT
East
No. 15 Florida	13	–	3	.813	29	–	8	.784
No. 11 Kentucky †	10	–	6	.625	29	–	9	.763
No. 25 Vanderbilt	9	–	7	.563	23	–	11	.676
Georgia	9	–	7	.563	21	–	12	.636
Tennessee	8	–	8	.500	19	–	15	.559
South Carolina	5	–	11	.313	14	–	16	.467
West
Alabama	12	–	4	.750	25	–	12	.676
Mississippi State	9	–	7	.563	17	–	14	.548
Ole Miss	7	–	9	.438	20	–	14	.588
Arkansas	7	–	9	.438	18	–	13	.581
Auburn	4	–	12	.250	11	–	20	.355
LSU	3	–	13	.188	11	–	21	.344
† 2011 SEC tournament winner As of April 2, 2011; Rankings from AP Poll

The 2011 SEC men's basketball tournament was held March 10–13, 2011 in Atlanta, Georgia at the Georgia Dome. The first, quarterfinal, and semifinal rounds were televised through the SEC Network and the semifinals and finals were broadcast nationwide on ABC, with the exception of the majority of South Carolina markets.

== Seeds ==
All Southeastern Conference schools participate in the tournament. Teams are seeded by 2010–11 SEC season record, with a tiebreaker system to seed teams with identical conference records. The top two teams in each division receive a first round bye.

The seeding for the tournament is as follows:

Seed	School	SEC Record
Eastern Division
#1	Florida	13–3 (24–6)
#2	Kentucky	10–6 (22–8)
#3	Vanderbilt	9–7 (21–9)
#4	Georgia	9–7 (20–10)
#5	Tennessee	8–8 (18–13)
#6	South Carolina	5–11 (14–15)
Western Division
#1	Alabama	12–4 (20–10)
#2	Mississippi State	9–7 (17–13)
#3	Ole Miss	7–9 (19–12)
#4	Arkansas	7–9 (18–12)
#5	Auburn	4–12 (11–19)
#6	LSU	3–13 (11–20)

== Schedule ==
Session	Game	Time*	Matchup^{#}	Television	Attendance
First Round - Thursday, March 10
1	1	1:00 PM	Auburn vs Georgia	SEC Network	12,144
1	2	3:30 PM	South Carolina vs Ole Miss	SEC Network	12,144
2	3	7:30 PM	Tennessee vs Arkansas	SEC Network	15,145
2	4	10:00 PM	LSU vs Vanderbilt	SEC Network	15,145
Quarterfinals - Friday, March 11
3	5	1:00 PM	Georgia vs Alabama	SEC Network	21,875
3	6	3:30 PM	Ole Miss vs Kentucky	SEC Network	21,875
4	7	7:30 PM	Tennessee vs Florida	SEC Network	17,096
4	8	10:00 PM	Vanderbilt vs Mississippi State	SEC Network	17,096
Semifinals - Saturday, March 12
5	9	1:00 PM	Alabama vs. Kentucky	ABC	21,728
5	10	3:30 PM	Florida vs. Vanderbilt	ABC	21,728
Championship Game - Sunday, March 13
6	11	1:00 PM	Kentucky vs. Florida	ABC	21,409
*Game Times in ET. #-Rankings denote tournament seeding.

== Bracket ==
First round March 10, 2011; SEC Network
E4	Georgia	69
W5	Auburn	51
W3	Ole Miss	66
E6	South Carolina	55
W4	Arkansas	68
E5	Tennessee	74
E3	Vanderbilt	62
W6	LSU	50

Quarterfinals; March 11, 2011; SEC Network
W1	Alabama	65*
E4	Georgia	59
E2	#15 Kentucky	75
W3	Ole Miss	66
E1	#12 Florida	85
E5	Tennessee	74
W2	Mississippi State	81
E3	Vanderbilt	87

Semifinals; March 12, 2011; ABC
W1	Alabama	58
E2	#15 Kentucky	72
E1	#12 Florida	77
E3	Vanderbilt	66

Championship Game; March 13, 2011; ABC
E2	#15 Kentucky	70
E1	#12 Florida	54

* Game went into Overtime
