= Rotnei Clarke =

American basketball player (born 1989)

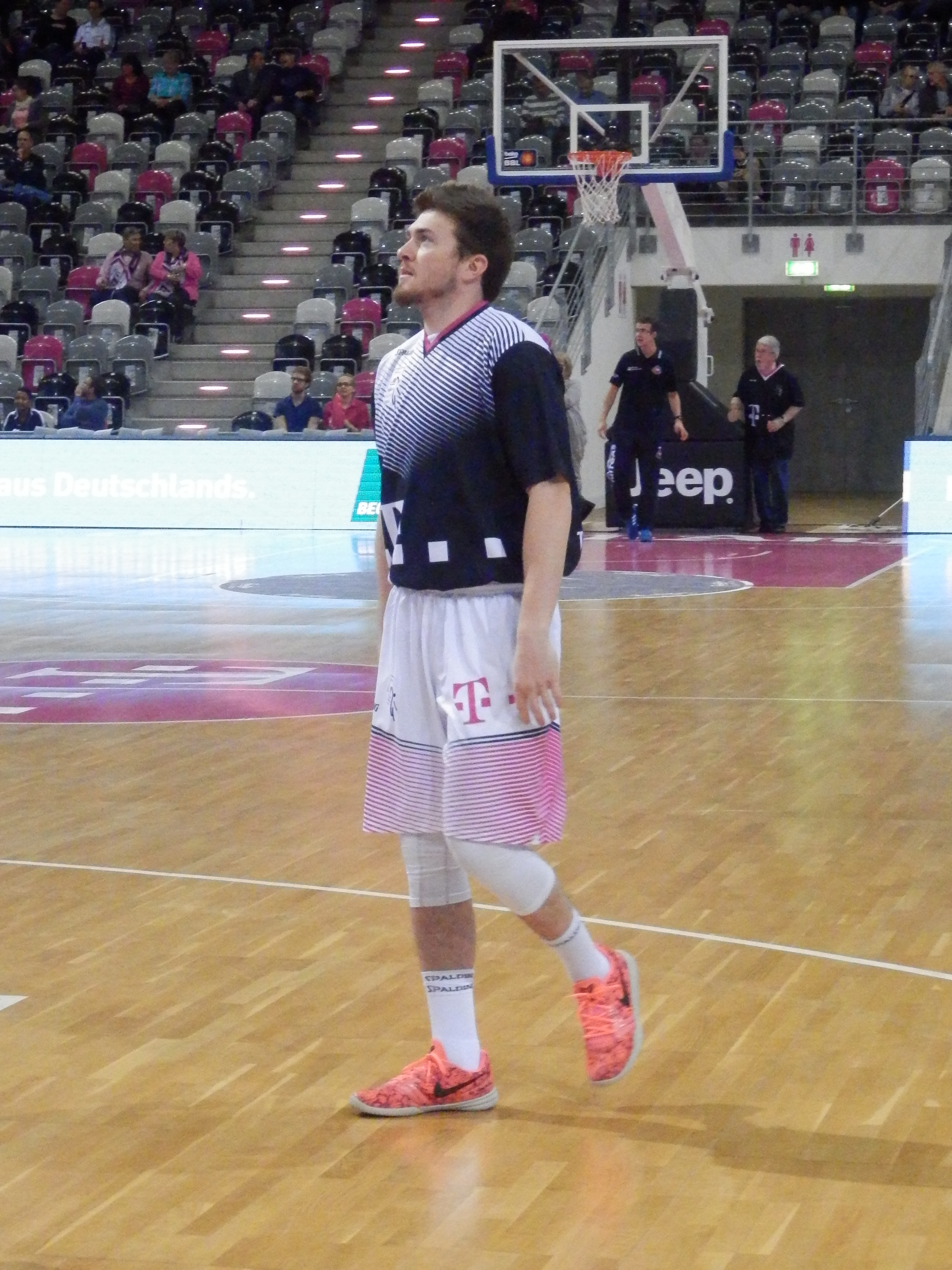
- Clarke with Baskets Bonn in 2015

Personal information
- Born: July 20, 1989 (age 37) Claremore, Oklahoma, U.S.
- Listed height: 6 ft 0 in (1.83 m)
- Listed weight: 183 lb (83 kg)

Career information
- High school: Verdigris (Claremore, Oklahoma)
- College: Arkansas (2008–2011); Butler (2012–2013)
- NBA draft: 2013: undrafted
- Playing career: 2013–2023
- Position: Point guard / shooting guard

Career history
- 2013–2014: Wollongong Hawks
- 2014–2015: Okapi Aalstar
- 2015–2016: Telekom Baskets Bonn
- 2016–2018: Illawarra Hawks
- 2017–2018: VL Pesaro
- 2018–2019: Pallacanestro Trapani
- 2019–2020: Pallacanestro Mantovana
- 2020–2021: Anwil Włocławek
- 2021: Cestistica San Severo
- 2021–2022: Scafati
- 2022–2023: UEB Gesteco Cividale

Career highlights
- NBL Most Valuable Player (2014); All-NBL First Team (2014); NBL Best Sixth Man (2017); First-team All-Atlantic 10 (2013); Second-team All-SEC (2011)

Rotnei Scott Clarke (born July 20, 1989) is an American former professional basketball player. He played college basketball for the University of Arkansas and Butler University before beginning his professional career in Australia with the Wollongong Hawks. In his rookie season, he was named the NBL's Most Valuable Player. He went on to play in Belgium and Germany before returning to the Hawks in 2016. He can play both point guard and shooting guard, and is known for his three-point shooting ability.

During high school, Clarke's sharp shooting and chase for the Oklahoma high-school scoring record attracted large crowds. During his senior year, he led Verdigris High School to the school's first state title. He captured the state scoring record, finishing with more than 3,700 career points. Clarke was highly recruited out of high school, attracting more than 50 college scholarship offers. He selected the Arkansas Razorbacks, joining the team for the 2008–09 season.

During a game in 2009, Clarke made 13 three-pointers and scored 51 points, setting SEC and team records respectively. During the 2010–11 season, he led Arkansas in scoring and made the All-SEC second team. Arkansas coach John Pelphrey was fired at the end of the season and Clarke elected to leave the team. After sitting out a year, he joined the Butler Bulldogs for the 2012–13 season. He led the Bulldogs in scoring and was named to the All-Atlantic 10 first team.

== Early life ==
Clarke was born to Conley and Christine Clarke. He was named after Oklahoma Sooners running back Rotnei Anderson. "(Anderson) was fast, and I wanted him to have a fast name," Clarke's father explained, “but we just called him ‘Baby’ til he was old enough to run.” Clarke is one-sixteenth Cherokee, a descendant of people who walked the Trail of Tears, and distantly related to actor Will Rogers and athlete Jim Thorpe.

From a very young age, Clarke was exposed to sport. By the fourth grade, he and his father were shooting together on an almost daily basis. Clarke's parents, who were both sports coaches, moved frequently as he was growing up. Wherever they went, they made sure Clarke had access to the school's gymnasium. By the time he entered seventh grade, he was attempting 500 shots a night. Before eighth grade, the family moved to Denison, Texas, where Clarke's uncle Kelly had landed a head basketball coaching job and had brought along Conley as an assistant coach. Within a year, Clarke had worn out the school's shooting machine.

== High school career ==
=== Freshman year ===
Before high school, Clarke's family returned to Oklahoma when Kelly and Conley Clarke took over coaching at Verdigris High School. Located 20 miles (32 km) northeast of Tulsa, Verdigris is a small town consisting of fewer than 4,000 people. Arriving in town a week before classes began, it was doubtful that Clarke would contribute much to a senior-laden team that had made the previous year's state tournament, losing in first round to the eventual champion. He ended up averaging 20 points per game, shooting 47% on three-pointers, while the Verdigris Cardinals finished 24–4. Verdigris recorded its first ever state-playoff win, before losing in the Class 3A semi-finals. Clarke was named to the Tulsa World All-Metro first team. Over the summer, he played for Team Texas where he was asked to play up an age group during a tournament. A 31-point performance against The Family of Detroit brought Clarke to the attention of college recruiters across the country.

=== Sophomore year ===
Boosted by several players moving into the area, Verdigris started the 2005–06 season ranked No. 2 in their class. In the first two games of a three-game tournament early in the season, Clarke scored 41 and 44 points. In the championship game, he was held to one three-pointer in the first half, before hitting 9-of-10 in the second half, including a game-tying shot at the buzzer. In overtime, he scored all ten of the Cardinals' points, bringing his game total to 55. Although the Verdigris gym holds 2,700, fans had to show up several hours before games to get a seat. So many people wanted to see Clarke play that highway officials added Verdigris to a highway exit sign on the Will Rogers Turnpike. He ended the year leading the state in scoring at 34.2 points per game. In the area final, Clarke hit the game winner as Verdigris defeated previously unbeaten Adair. In the state tournament, the Cardinals again reached the semi-final game. Clarke was named Metro Player of the Year by Tulsa World, becoming the first sophomore since 1980 to earn the honor, and was the only Oklahoman named to MaxPreps' national honorable mention list.

=== Junior year ===
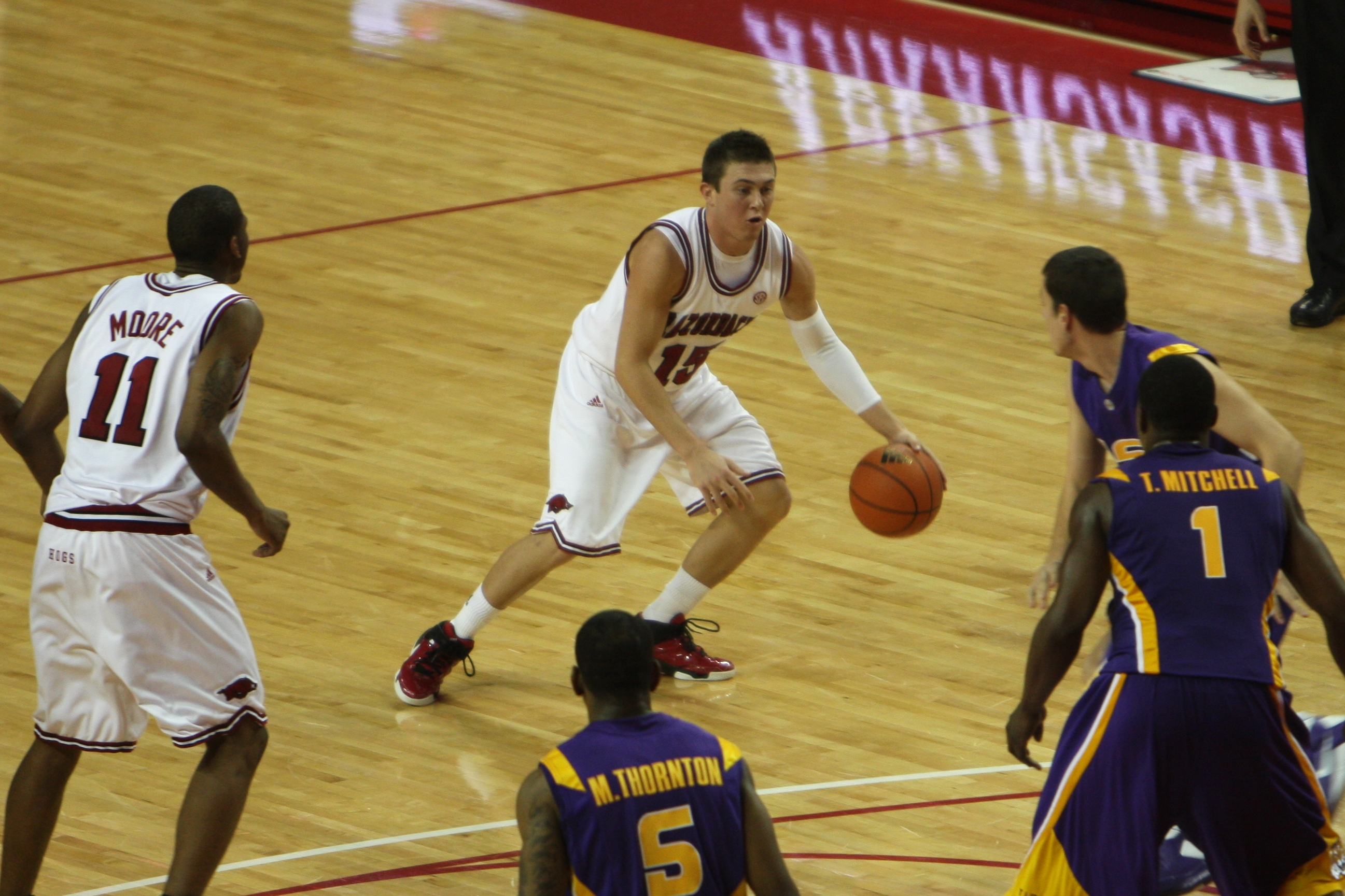
Clarke (#15, center) dribbles the ball against LSU on February 18, 2009

By his junior year, Clarke was a pop-culture hero to many fans and the target of profane insults from opposing crowds. "[The insults] just angered me and, in a way, just fueled me and made me want to do better," he recalled. Opponents' defenses grew more physical as they tried to stop Clarke. Verdigris coaches ordered Clarke not to enter the foul lane for fear that he would be clobbered. The team traveled with a nurse who carried bandages, glue, and stitches to treat the frequent blows to the face that Clarke suffered. When he scored a career-high 65 points at Berryhill, Clarke was removed part way through the fourth quarter as his coaches feared for his safety. In a game at Nowata, he received a death threat. When the originators, two local boys, were found, the Clarkes did not press charges but instead asked the perpetrators to apologize at the sheriff's office. In one game, the opposing team had two players simultaneously guard Clarke all game; he still managed to score 31 points. During a playoff game, 2,800 fans showed up to watch Clarke play, 300 more than capacity. He scored 57. In the state playoffs, Verdigris faced Vian, a school with three future Division I football players on their roster. Clarke was subjected to physical defense from a linebacker, had trouble breathing at times due to allergies, and scored 60 points. The performance set a state single-tournament-game record. For the season, Clarke averaged 37.2 points, which increased to 46.2 in the playoffs, and 9.0 rebounds per game. For the third consecutive year, the Cardinals lost in the semi-finals of the state playoffs. Clarke was again named Player of the Year by Tulsa World. During the AAU spring season, he averaged 25 points for Team Texas.

=== Senior year ===
During Clarke's senior year, fan fever reached new heights as he battled Pawnee's Keiton Page for the state scoring title. When Verdigris met Pawnee in the Tulsa area Tournament of Champions, so many fans were buying tickets that the start of the game was delayed for 30 minutes. Clarke scored 34, but Pawnee won the game behind 28 points from Page. More than 5,000 fans turned out for the area final against Adair on February 29, 2008, as Clarke closed in on the state scoring record of 3,639 points held by Ty Harman, a record that had stood since 1989. "You couldn't get in there sideways," recalled an observer. With 3:14 to go in the fourth quarter, Clarke scored his 3,640th point on a made free throw. Clarke ended the game with 37 points, 3 assists, and 2 steals, as he led Verdigris into the state playoffs with a 70–51 victory. "It's a great feeling and it's truly a blessing," Clarke said after the game. "I'm glad to have it out of the way so we can focus on our main goal — winning a state championship." While fans rejoiced in the record, others criticized Verdigris for running up the score in some games to get Clarke more points. Coach Kelly Clarke acknowledged the criticism saying, "I made a decision that I was going to be the bad guy in this. For three years I took him out [at the end of blowouts]. I didn't want to look back in a couple years and think I held him back from accomplishing this."

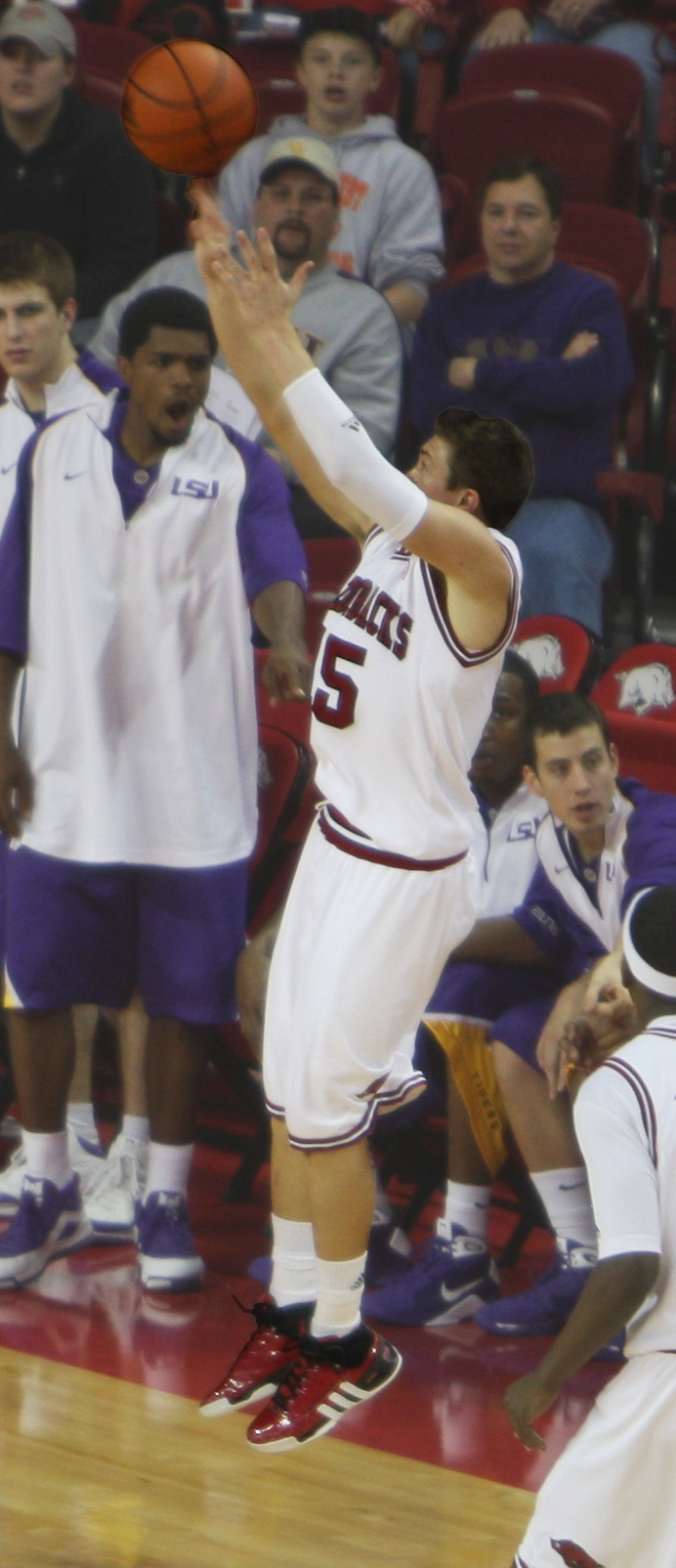
Clarke launches a shot against LSU February 18, 2009

More than 13,000 people attended the 2008 state finals, filling the aisles of the 10,000 seat arena that hosted the event. The crowd is believed to be the largest ever to witness a high school game in Oklahoma. Clarke scored 25 and led Verdigris to the school's first Class 3A state championship. After the game, he signed autographs for 90 minutes. To recognize the accomplishment, the town of Verdigris renamed a street "Rotnei Clarke Road" and his school retired his jersey. Since then, the street sign has often been stolen by fans looking for a souvenir. Clarke ended the season averaging 40.9 points, 8.0 rebounds, 6.9 assists, and 3.4 steals per game. He shared Tulsa World Player of the Year honors with Page, who broke the state's single-season scoring record.

Clarke ended his high school career with 3,758 points, beating out Page's 3,709 for the most in Oklahoma high school history. Over the course of this career, he averaged 33.2 points, 6.9 rebounds, 5.1 assists, and 3.4 steals per game. He scored more than 40 points 34 times, more than 50 points seven times, and more than 60 twice. He shot 47% on three-pointers, 60% on two-pointers, and 89% on free throws, while leading Verdigris to a 99–15 record. "When I think back on [my high school days], it was a crazy deal," says Clarke. "It was fun. But at the same time, there was a lot of pressure on every game."

According to Verdigris teachers, Clarke was more than a star athlete; he was a role model. He maintained a 4.0 grade point average and was a member of Verdigris' student council and honor society. His work ethic was an inspiration to younger players, and he was happy to help them work on their games. Clarke's active Christian faith inspired classmates to bring Bibles to games and wear T-shirts with Bible verses. "He made it OK to give glory to God and not be selfish about things," recalled a teacher.

== College career ==
=== Recruiting ===
Coming out of high school, Clarke was highly recruited, attracting more than 50 scholarship offers. There was so much interest in Clarke, that he ran up a $400 cell phone bill largely on texts from interested coaches. His bedroom was filled with more than 2,500 recruiting letters. ESPN ranked Clarke as the sixth best point guard, and 52nd best player overall in his recruiting class. Dave Telep, analyst for Scout.com, wrote "He is flat out, without a doubt, the best shooter in the 2008 class". The service rated Clarke as 4-stars. Clarke turned down offers from Gonzaga, Kansas, Kentucky, Memphis, North Carolina, Oklahoma, and Oklahoma State, among others, in order to sign with Arkansas in November 2008. He liked the school's fans, staff, and facilities, and the fact that he would be able to contribute from day one. Clarke's immediate family relocated to Fayetteville, where his maternal grandmother also lived, to support his career. "My grandma really [worked] on me" to choose Arkansas, he remarked.

=== Freshman year ===
During his freshman year, Clarke started all 30 games for Arkansas. He averaged 31.5 minutes and 12.2 points per game. He led the nation in three-point shooting percentage among freshmen at 39.3%, and shot 93.5% on free throws. He hit at least three three-pointers 17 times, and scored in double figures 22 times.

=== Sophomore year ===
Prior to his sophomore year, Fox Sports rated Clarke as the top shooter in the country. During a game against Alcorn State, he set a single-game Southeastern conference (SEC) record by hitting 13 three-pointers. His 51 points set a school record. For his accomplishments, Clarke was named SEC Player of the Week on November 16, 2009. He finished the year with 100 made three-pointers, second all-time by an Arkansas player, and averaged 15.1 points per game. He ranked ninth in the country in both three-point shooting percentage (42.7%) and three-pointers made per game (3.2). Clarke was named to the SEC Community Service Team and the United States Basketball Writers Association (USBWA) All-District VII team. He led Arkansas in scoring nine times, and scored in double figures 23 times. Additionally, he was named to the athletic department honor roll during fall semester.

=== Junior year ===
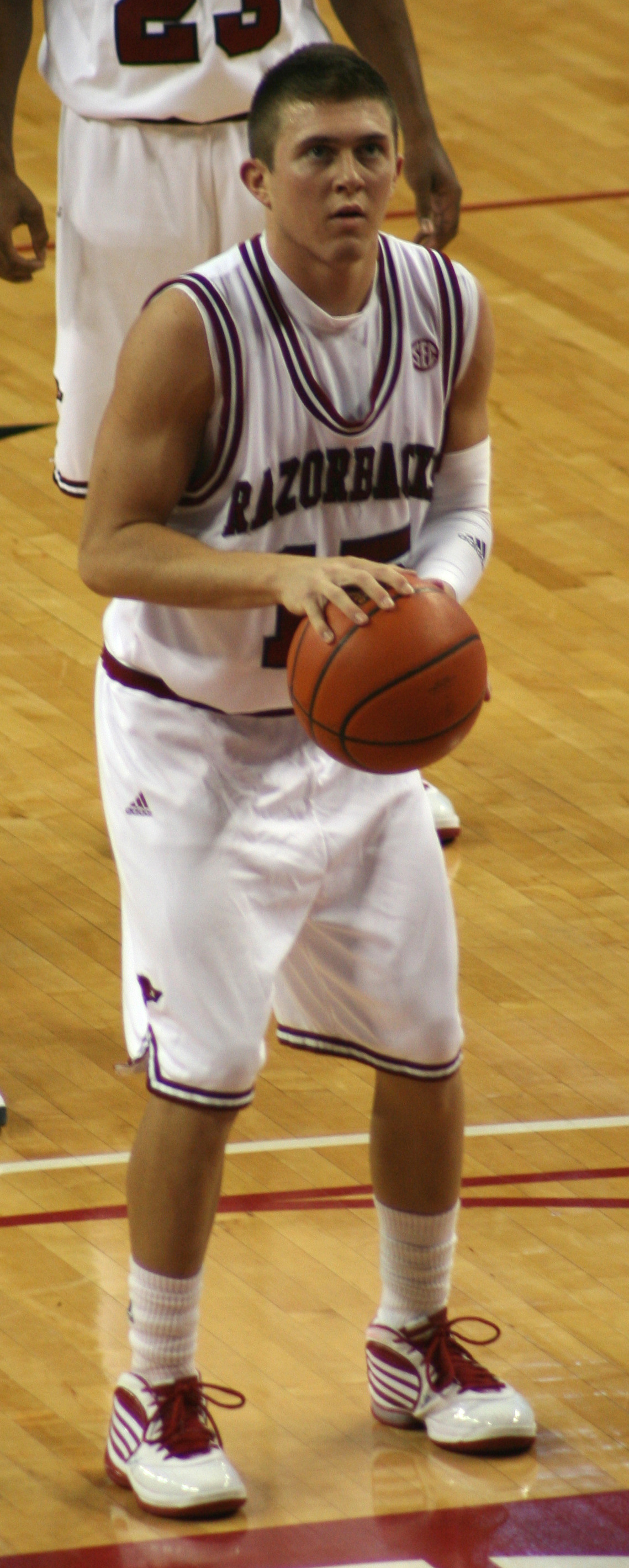
Clarke prepares to take a free throw against Morgan State on November 25, 2009

As a junior, Clarke was named to the preseason All-SEC second team by Lindy's. Athlon ranked Clarke as the nation's second best shooter, and Sporting News ranked him as the top shooter in the SEC. After scoring an SEC career high 36 points against then 19th ranked Vanderbilt, he was named SEC Player of the Week on January 31, 2011. On February 28, he was again honored as Player of the Week after he led Arkansas to wins over Alabama and 22nd ranked Kentucky. For the season, Clarke led Arkansas with 15.2 points per game and made the All-SEC second team.

=== Transfer ===
Arkansas never made the NCAA tournament during Clarke's tenure and coach John Pelphrey was fired after the 2010–11 season. Upon Pelphrey's firing, Clarke asked to be released from his scholarship. Initially, new head coach Mike Anderson convinced Clarke to stay. After a few months, Clarke again asked for his release. "I have spent the last couple of months getting to know Coach Anderson, his staff and his system. And I still feel as though it's best for me to finish my career somewhere else," he explained. Anderson initially refused, but relinquished a short while later. "I just knew I was supposed to get out of there," Clarke later recalled. "I especially knew it when Coach Pelphrey got fired. I just didn't feel comfortable with it at all. But it was hard because I dedicated so much to that program." Previously, Clarke had asked for a scholarship release after the 2009–10 season.

An estimated 40–50 schools expressed interest in Clarke transferring to their team. After carefully weighing his options, Clarke selected Butler, a team that had not recruited him during high school, but had impressed him with back-to-back appearances in the national title game. "It just felt like the best fit for me," Clarke remarked. "I wasn't interested in things like top-notch facilities anymore," he explained. "I was interested in being around good teammates, good people ... And the success Butler had had the previous two years really attracted me." Commenting on Clarke's decision, Eamonn Brennan said he might be a "perfect fit" for Butler.

As a transfer, Clarke had to sit out a year before being eligible to play. He used the redshirt year to work on his game, practicing against Butler's Ronald Nored, who was considered one of the top defenders in the country. "I'm not the quickest guy so playing against a defender like that, you find ways to get by, you find different ways to come off a screen," he remarked. NCAA regulations kept Clarke from traveling with the team for road games, so he practiced alone in Hinkle Fieldhouse, refusing to leave until he had made 500 shots on the night. To facilitate his workouts, Clarke persuaded head coach Brad Stevens to give him a key to the building. "At night it would just be me and the ball and basket", he recalls. "That was all that mattered to me. Shooting puts me at ease, it puts me at peace, it takes everything else off my mind." Clarke describes the experience as "definitely one of the toughest years," but credits his teammates and his faith for getting him through it.

While at Arkansas, Clarke had routinely complained about pain and reduced flexibility in his ankles, but medical tests failed to identify the problem. By the end of seasons, he would be worn down. Butler trainers identified the problem – a bone defect he was born with – but it would require surgery that would confine Clarke to a wheelchair and limit his activity for four months. In the spring of 2012, Clarke elected to undergo the surgery. He had never been without basketball for more than two weeks before, and had trouble dealing with the situation. There were nights he cried himself to sleep. "It was the ultimate low for me", he later recalled. "But this made me realize that if basketball is taken away from me, I know I still have my relationship with Him [God]."

=== Senior year ===
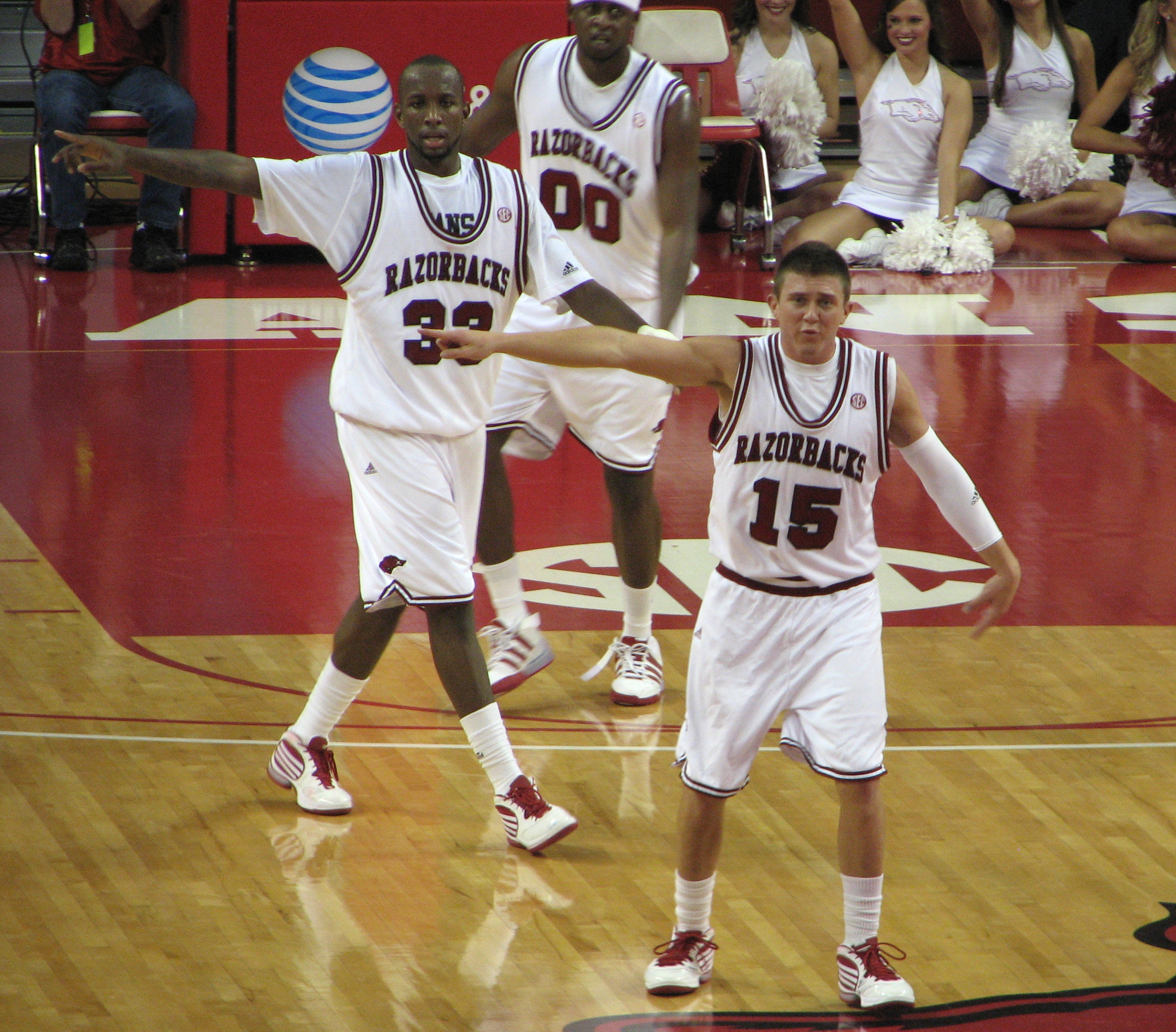
Clarke (front) and his Arkansas teammates prepare to defend against Morgan State on November 24, 2009

During Clarke's redshirt year, Butler struggled, finishing the year 22–15 and missing the NCAA Tournament. Conley and Chris Clarke took leaves of absence from work to live in Indianapolis during the subsequent 2012–13 season. Clarke was selected to the Atlantic 10 Preseason All-Conference second team, but Butler started the season unranked. During the opening round game of the Maui Invitational, Clarke hit a running three-pointer at the buzzer to lead Butler to a 72–71 victory over Marquette. Video of the shot went viral. "You grow up as a kid — I know I did — watching that tournament, wanting to be in that situation in that atmosphere", Clarke remarked. "To hit a shot like that and be able to celebrate with my teammates was one of the coolest things ever." For his efforts, Clarke was named to the All-Tournament team and selected as the Atlantic 10 Player of the Week.

On December 15, 2012, Butler faced off against number one ranked Indiana. With Indiana up four points in overtime, Clarke hit a three-pointer that launched an 8–2 Butler run to finish the game. After the game, Clarke remarked that the possibility of big upsets "was one of the reasons I came [to Butler]". The win was Butler's first ever over a number-one ranked them and launched them into the top 25. By early January, the team was ranked 13th in the AP Poll.

On January 12, 2013, during a game against Dayton, Clarke stole the ball from Matt Derenbecker and was going up for a fast-break layup when he was fouled hard from behind by Derenbecker. Clarke lost his balance and crashed headfirst into the basket support. He collapsed to the floor where he remained for several minutes. From his neck down, he was numb; his arms moved, but he had no control over the movement. Coach Stevens called it the scariest thing he had ever witnessed on the basketball court. As medical trainers examined Clarke, he told them "I'm not coming out [of the game]". Despite his declaration, he knew the situation was serious, but he tried to stay positive: "I tried to think as many good things as I could, that I was going to be OK and that everything was going to be fine."

After a long delay, Clarke was taken from the floor on a stretcher and transported to an area hospital. By the time he arrived, the numbness was subsiding. X-rays revealed that he had suffered a severely strained neck, but no long-term damage. "He is really lucky," remarked Stevens. "There was a distinct possibility he wouldn't walk again." Two hours later, Clarke walked out of the hospital in a soft neck brace, and with a new perspective. "I feel very blessed that day that I was able to walk out of that hospital," he said. "It hit like I've never been hit before. There are more important things than a game of basketball."

Clarke missed Butler's next three games and was not allowed to engage in strenuous activity such as basketball practice. "That was the worst thing for me," he remarked. "I'm not a patient guy," he explained. "[I had] to learn to be patient ... and listen to whatever the doctors [told] me". The day he received his medical release, Clarke was back in Hinkle shooting. "It [was] the first time [I'd] seen him truly happy in two weeks," remarked Clarke's father. Clarke returned to action on January 26 in a game against Temple after missing three games. He scored 24 points and dished out a career-high nine assists.

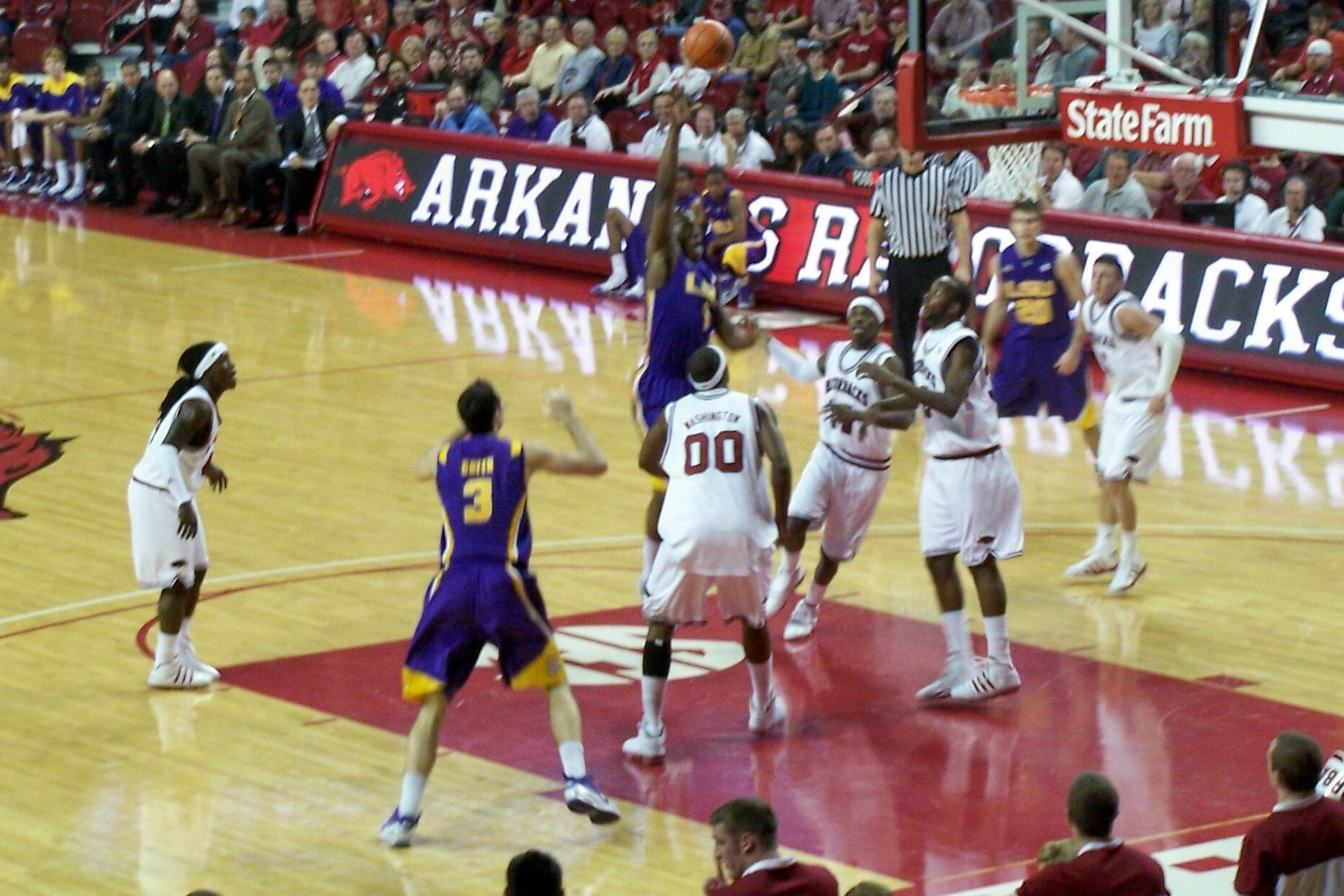
Clarke (far right) and his Arkansas teammates on defense against LSU on February 10, 2010

Clarke finished the regular season with a 16.7 point per game average, fourth in the Atlantic 10. He was first in the conference in made three-pointers per game (3.5) and free throw percentage (89.6%). Clarke led Butler to a 24–7 record and third-place finish in the Atlantic 10. His accomplishments landed Clarke on the Atlantic 10 All-Conference first team. He was selected to the National Association of Basketball Coaches All-District 4 team and was the only non-Big Ten player selected for the USBWA All-District V team.

During the Atlantic 10 tournament, Clarke scored 21 and 14 points in wins over Dayton and La Salle, and 16 points in a loss to St. Louis. He collected eight assists and hit ten three-pointers over the three game stretch. Clarke's efforts landed him on the All-Tournament first team. Butler entered the NCAA tournament as the sixth seed. For Clarke, it was the first time his team was selected to a postseason tournament. Commenting on the experience, he said "I was extremely nervous [watching the selection show.] I don't know why. It's my first time to go through this and I was sweating and my knees were shaking a little bit."

In Butler's round of 64 NCAA tournament game versus Bucknell, Clarke struggled with nerves. "I wouldn't want to admit that, but it kind of showed, I think," he remarked. Through the first thirty minutes of the game, he had only six points and no made three-pointers. However, over the final ten minutes he scored 11, including two important threes, helping Butler to a 68–56 victory. Two days later, Butler faced off with Marquette. Clarke came out hot, scoring 18 before half time. However, he injured his shoulder near the end of the half and was less effective in the second half, scoring just six points. He missed a potential game winning three in the final seconds, but made five on the game. "My shoulder is sore, but that didn't have any effect on the [last] shot," he remarked. It was later revealed that he injured ligaments near his clavicle, an injury that requires six-weeks of recovery time.

Clarke ended the season with 115 made three-pointers, second most ever by a Butler player, and fifth most ever by an Atlantic 10 player. For the season, he was first in the Atlantic 10 and sixth in the NCAA in made threes per game with 3.48. His 88.6% free-throw accuracy ranked second in the Atlantic 10, and ninth on the Butler all-time list. Clarke made at least one three in all 33 games he played for Butler, and his last 46 college games overall. He finished his career with 389 made three-pointers, tied for 15th in NCAA history. "When I made my decision to leave Arkansas, I knew that I wanted to be somewhere that I'd have the opportunity to play in the NCAA Tournament ... It's amazing how God works", commented Clarke on his Butler experience. "I'm blessed and thankful to be able to share two years with these guys, this coaching staff, and been a part of the Butler community. It's been pretty special."

Clarke was selected to participate in the postseason all-star game for college seniors, but withdrew due to the shoulder injury he suffered against Marquette. While still recovering from the shoulder injury, he participated in the Portsmouth (Va.) Invitational camp and tournament for NBA prospects in mid-April. He averaged 10.3 points and 4.3 assists over three games.

== Professional career ==
=== 2013 NBA draft ===
Ahead of the 2013 NBA draft, Clarke trained at St. Vincent Sports Performance and hired Doug Neustadt to be his agent. Clarke had workouts with the Indiana Pacers and Washington Wizards, but was not expected to be drafted due to his height. ESPN's Chad Ford ranked Clarke as the year's 98th best prospect. Ultimately, he was not drafted. Clarke said he would rather play professionally in Europe than in the NBA Development League, believing that is his most likely route to the NBA. "I do believe I have the confidence and I have the ability to play in [the NBA]," he said. "I'm not going to go out and say I'm going to be a starter ... But I do believe I have the ability to come in and do things that a lot of people think I can't."

=== Wollongong Hawks ===
The Wollongong Hawks of Australia's National Basketball League contacted Clarke's agent and were told that Clarke intended to play in Europe and was out of their price range. Clarke later had a change of heart, and on August 1, 2013, he signed with the Hawks for the 2013–14 NBL season. He made his debut for the Hawks in the team's season opener on October 10, recording 20 points and six rebounds in a 92–73 loss to the New Zealand Breakers. The Hawks struggled with consistency in 2013–14, but behind Clarke, they managed to stay in playoff contention. Clarke earned Player of the Month honors twice during the season, for December and February, and battled for MVP supremacy with Melbourne Tigers guard Chris Goulding and Perth Wildcats forward James Ennis. Clarke helped the Hawks finish the regular season with a 13–15 record, good for fourth spot on the ladder out of eight teams. In their semi-final match-up with the Perth Wildcats, Clarke struggled with his shot, going 10-of-32 over the two games they played. In the best-of-three series, the Hawks were swept 2–0 by the eventual champion Wildcats. At the season's end, he was named the recipient of the NBL Most Valuable Player Award ahead of Goulding and Ennis. He finished third in total points scored (633), fourth in scoring average (21.1 points per game), equal first for three-pointers (95) and third for free throw percentage (81%). He appeared in all 30 games for the Hawks and also averaged 2.0 rebounds and 3.4 assists per game.

=== Okapi Aalstar ===
On June 19, 2014, Clarke signed with Belgian club Okapi Aalstar for the 2014–15 season. In 32 games for the club, he averaged 17.5 points, 2.4 rebounds and 3.3 assists per game. He also played in six EuroChallenge games, averaging 15.5 points, 1.8 rebounds, 3.3 assists and 1.0 steals per game.

=== Telekom Baskets Bonn ===
On July 10, 2015, Clarke signed with German club Telekom Baskets Bonn for the 2015–16 season. In 33 games for the club, he averaged 11.5 points, 1.8 rebounds and 2.9 assists per game. He also played in 10 EuroCup games, averaging 11.1 points, 1.6 rebounds and 3.3 assists per game.

=== Illawarra Hawks and Italy ===
On July 12, 2016, Clarke signed a two-year deal with the Illawarra Hawks, returning to the club for a second stint. October 7, 2016, he scored a team-high 23 points in the Hawks' 122–88 season-opening win over the Adelaide 36ers. On December 5, 2016, he scored a season-high 29 points off the bench in a 99–93 loss to the Sydney Kings. On February 11, 2017, in the Hawks' regular season finale, Clarke had 24 points, six assists, five rebounds off the bench in helping the team secure a playoff spot with a 106–79 win over the Brisbane Bullets. Two days later, he was named the recipient of the NBL Best Sixth Man Award. After helping the Hawks defeat the first-seeded Adelaide 36ers in the semi-finals, Clarke and the Hawks moved on to the best-of-five NBL Grand Final series, where they were defeated 3–0 by the Perth Wildcats. He appeared in all 34 games for the Hawks in 2016–17, averaging 17.4 points, 2.7 rebounds, 2.8 assists and 1.0 steals per game.

On March 9, 2017, Clarke signed with Victoria Libertas Pesaro of the Lega Basket Serie A for the rest of the 2016–17 season. In eight games for Pesaro, he averaged 19.5 points, 3.0 rebounds, 2.9 assists and 1.0 steals per game.

In his second season with the Illawarra Hawks, Clarke averaged 18.1 points, 2.8 rebounds and 2.8 assists in 25 games. On November 5, 2017, he scored a season-high 29 points in a 93–83 win over the Sydney Kings. The Hawks missed the finals in 2017–18 with a 12–16 record.

On February 20, 2018, Clarke re-signed with Victoria Libertas Pesaro for the rest of the 2017–18 season. He joined Pallacanestro Trapani of the Italian second division on July 16, 2018.

On August 1, 2019, he has signed with Pallacanestro Mantovana of the Italian Serie A2 Basket. He averaged 19.3 points, 2.2 rebounds and 4.3 assists per game.

=== Poland ===
On October 24, 2020, Clarke signed with Anwil Włocławek of the Polish Basketball League.

=== Return to Italy ===
On February 17, 2021, he has signed with Cestistica San Severo of the Italian Serie A2 Basket. On July 16, he signed with Scafati Basket.

== Skill set and accolades ==
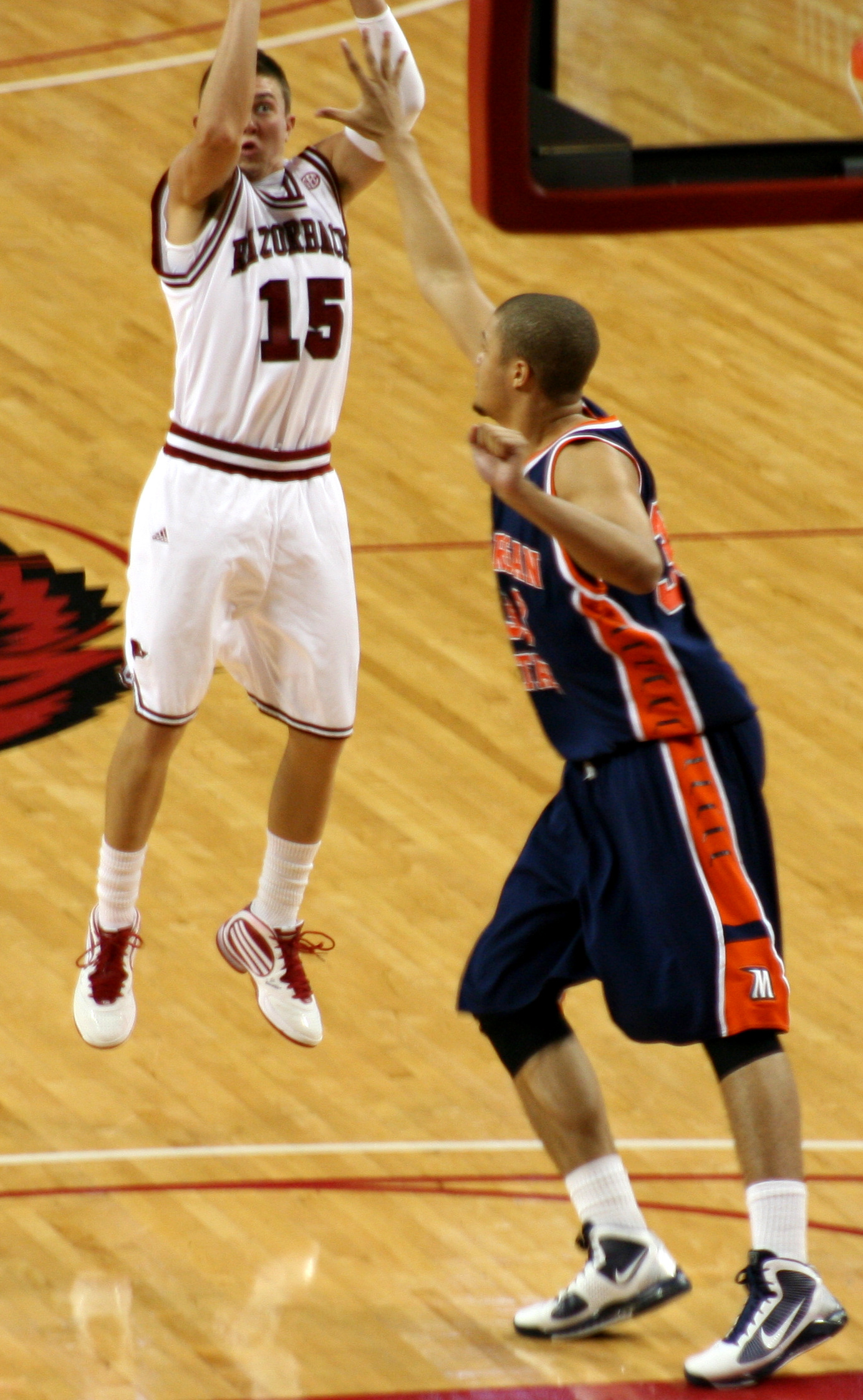
Clarke shoots over a Morgan State defender on November 25, 2009

Clarke began high school as a shooting guard, but worked to expand his game. "I [worked] very hard on being able to get my shot off the dribble, hard on driving the basket and on all facet of my game," he said. "I was determined not to be known as just a spot-up shooter." During the summer AAU season after his sophomore year, he switched to playing the point. During his three years at Arkansas, Clarke switched back to being a shooting guard. During his redshirt year at Butler, he ran the point for the scout team. He handled the task well and became Butler's primary ball-handler for the 2012–13 season, but also played off the ball at times. On Clarke's transition to point guard and role on the team, Butler assistant coach Michael Lewis remarked, "He's a much better overall basketball player than he was at Arkansas. At the same time, we ... don't want to limit Rotnei Clarke's shot."

Clarke was named "Metro Boys Player of the Year" three times by Tulsa World. Prior to college, he was invited to the NBA Players Association Camp, as well as basketball camps run by Kobe Bryant and LeBron James. During the 2009–10 season, both Fox Sports and ESPN's Andy Katz rated Clarke as the best shooter in college basketball. During the 2010–11 season, Clarke was ranked the nation's second best shooter by Athlon.

Prior to the 2012–13 season, USA Today's Big Lead Sports ranked Clarke as the 35th best player in college basketball. That same season, Jay Bilas described Clarke as the nation's top three-point shooter. He was selected as a finalist for the 2013 Naismith College Player of the Year. On Clarke, his Butler University Head Coach Brad Stevens commented: "It's arguable who is the best standstill three-point shooter, but I don't know that there's anybody I've ever seen in the last three years who can make so many tough threes with just a sliver of daylight." Clarke's catch-to-shot-release time has been clocked at 0.6 seconds.

Clarke is often referred to as a "gym rat" because of his work ethic. During high school, a typical workout would involve 500 made three-pointers, 200 made free throws, numerous mid-range jumpshots, weight-lifting, sprinting and ball-handling drills. Sessions could last four hours or more. "You learn to shoot when you're fatigued," says Clarke. "If you want something bad enough, you will work as hard as you can to get there." Stevens credits Clarke's work ethic for motivating the rest of the team. "Our team gets in the gym twice as much because of Rotnei's presence," Stevens declared. "He is the ultimate gym rat."

== Personal life ==
Clarke's Christian faith plays a central role in his life. "I give all my glory to God. He put me on this Earth to play basketball." he explains. In 2012, when basketball was taken away from him due to surgery, Clarke began to doubt his faith. "There was a time I definitely doubted God," he recalls. "I left my family. I left my friends. I left diehard fans who just wanted to see me succeed ... It was the ultimate low for me." After some soul searching, he concluded his doubts were a "mistake". He explains:

It's easy to praise God because I've had a great day or a great practice or a great game. It's easy to praise him in success, but when you are really going through a struggle or something really tough in your life, I feel like I blame God. But this made me realize that if basketball is taken away from me, I know I still have my relationship with Him. I can still find Him. I can still seek Him. He's going to be there for me no matter what – when basketball isn't.

Clarke has been described as the Tim Tebow of basketball due to his evangelic outreach. During high school, teachers and classmates noticed the way Clarke lived his life and were attracted to his faith. He regularly spoke with teammates and opposing players about his faith. He left letters on visiting players' lockers explaining what Jesus meant to him. At Arkansas, Clarke often spoke about his faith at churches and basketball events around Fayetteville. During his senior year at Butler, he organized an on-campus event "Rotnei Clarke's Testimony" where he talked about his faith.

Clarke is naturally an introvert and does not necessarily like being recognized off the basketball court. He has a close relationship with his sister Cassie, with whom he exchanges Bible verses via text message before games. "Cassie and I are best friends," Clarke remarks. He is good friends with former Butler player Ronald Nored. Clarke describes himself as "an outdoorsy kind of guy." When he is not playing basketball, he enjoys hunting and fishing. He listens to Christian rap regularly and cites Lecrae as a non-athlete that he looks up to. Clarke lists JJ Redick as his favorite basketball player of all-time. He hopes to become a coach after his playing days are over. He said "I don't think I'll ever get away from the game of basketball."

In June 2014, Clarke married Patricia Elliott, and the couple have one daughter, Kyah.

== See also ==
- List of NCAA Division I men's basketball players with 12 or more 3-point field goals in a game
