= Florida Gators men's basketball statistical leaders =

The Florida Gators men's basketball statistical leaders are individual statistical leaders of the Florida Gators men's basketball program in various categories, including points, rebounds, assists, steals, and blocks. Within those areas, the lists identify single-game, single-season, and career leaders. The Gators represent the University of Florida in the NCAA's Southeastern Conference.

Florida began competing in intercollegiate basketball in 1915. However, the school's record book does not generally list records from before the 1950s, as records from before this period are often incomplete and inconsistent. Since scoring was much lower in this era, and teams played much fewer games during a typical season, it is likely that few or no players from this era would appear on these lists anyway.

The NCAA did not officially record assists as a stat until the 1983–84 season, and blocks and steals until the 1985–86 season, but Florida's record books includes players in these stats before these seasons. These lists are updated through the end of the 2020–21 season.

== Scoring ==
Career
Rk	Player	Points	Seasons
1	Ronnie Williams	2,090	1980–81 1981–82 1982–83 1983–84
2	Kenny Boynton	2,033	2009–10 2010–11 2011–12 2012–13
3	Andrew Moten	1,930	1983–84 1984–85 1985–86 1986–87
4	Udonis Haslem	1,781	1998–99 1999–00 2000–01 2001–02
5	Erving Walker	1,777	2008–09 2009–10 2010–11 2011–12
6	KeVaughn Allen	1,723	2015–16 2016–17 2017–18 2018–19
7	Stacey Poole	1,678	1989–90 1990–91 1991–92 1992–93
8	Dwayne Schintzius	1,624	1986–87 1987–88 1988–89 1989–90
9	Neal Walk	1,600	1966–67 1967–68 1968–69
10	Gene Shy	1,573	1972–73 1973–74 1974–75 1975–76

Season
Rk	Player	Points	Season
1	Walter Clayton Jr.	713	2024-25
2	Andy Owens	676	1969–70
3	Neal Walk	663	1967–68
4	Neal Walk	649	1968–69
5	Vernon Maxwell	648	1985–86
6	Walter Clayton Jr.	633	2023–24
7	Nick Calathes	618	2008–09
8	Stacey Poole	589	1991–92
9	Kenny Boynton	588	2011–12
10	Dan Cross	581	1993–94

Single game
Rk	Player	Points	Season	Opponent
1	Tony Miller	54	1971–72	Chicago State
2	Dick Tomlinson	44	1963–64	Tampa
3	Andy Owens	41	1969–70	Mississippi St.
	Joe Hobbs	41	1957–58	Georgia
5	Eugene McDowell	40	1982–83	Biscayne
	Cliff Luyk	40	1961–62	Tennessee
7	Tony Miller	39	1971–72	Auburn
	Andy Owens	39	1969–70	Harvard
	Andy Owens	39	1969–70	Louisville
	Neal Walk	39	1967–68	LSU

== Rebounds ==
Career
Rk	Player	Rebounds	Seasons
1	Neal Walk	1,181	1966–67 1967–68 1968–69
2	Eugene McDowell	1,063	1981–82 1982–83 1983–84 1984–85
3	Andrew DeClercq	958	1991–92 1992–93 1993–94 1994–95
4	Ronnie Williams	954	1980–81 1981–82 1982–83 1983–84
5	Dwayne Davis	921	1987–88 1988–89 1989–90 1990–91
6	Bob Emrick	869	1953–54 1954–55 1955–56 1956–57
	David Lee	869	2001–02 2002–03 2003–04 2004–05
	Al Horford	869	2004–05 2005–06 2006–07
9	Chandler Parsons	859	2007–08 2008–09 2009–10 2010–11
10	Gary Keller	855	1964–65 1965–66 1966–67

Season
Rk	Player	Rebounds	Season
1	Neal Walk	494	1967–68
2	Neal Walk	481	1968–69
3	Rueben Chinyelu	393	2025–26
4	Al Horford	360	2006–07
5	Cliff Luyk	352	1961–62
6	Joakim Noah	337	2006–07
7	Bob Smyth	330	1975–76
8	Jim Zinn	328	1957–58
	Cliff Luyk	328	1960–61
10	Gary Keller	326	1965–66

Single game
Rk	Player	Rebounds	Season	Opponent
1	Neal Walk	31	1967–68	Alabama
	Jim Zinn	31	1956–57	Ole Miss
3	Jim Zinn	30	1955–56	Wofford
	Lew Doss	30	1954–55	Mississippi State
5	Neal Walk	29	1967–68	Kentucky
6	Neal Walk	27	1967–68	Florida State
7	Cliff Luyk	26	1961–62	Kentucky
8	Neal Walk	25	1968–69	Georgia
9	Neal Walk	24	1968–69	Ole Miss
	Cliff Luyk	24	1960–61	Jacksonville

== Assists ==
Career
Rk	Player	Assists	Seasons
1	Chris Chiozza	571	2014–15 2015–16 2016–17 2017–18
2	Erving Walker	547	2008–09 2009–10 2010–11 2011–12
3	Kasey Hill	530	2013–14 2014–15 2015–16 2016–17
4	Ronnie Montgomery	503	1984–85 1985–86 1986–87 1987–88
5	Eddie Shannon	493	1995–96 1996–97 1997–98 1998–99
6	Nick Calathes	452	2007–08 2008–09
7	Vernon Delancy	427	1980–81 1981–82 1982–83 1983–84
8	Greg Williams	423	1993–94 1994–95 1995–96 1996–97
9	Scottie Wilbekin	419	2010–11 2011–12 2012–13 2013–14
10	Andrew Moten	411	1983–84 1984–85 1985–86 1986–87

Season
Rk	Player	Assists	Season
1	Nick Calathes	231	2008–09
2	Nick Calathes	221	2007–08
3	Chris Chiozza	208	2017–18
4	Andrew Nembhard	194	2018–19
5	Ronnie Montgomery	190	1987–88
6	Taurean Green	184	2005–06
7	Scottie Wilbekin	174	2012–13
8	Andrew Nembhard	173	2019–20
9	Erving Walker	170	2011–12
10	Erving Walker	166	2009–10

Single game
Rk	Player	Assists	Season	Opponent
1	Jason Williams	17	1997–98	Duquesne
2	Jerry Hoover	16	1970–71	Alabama
3	Steve Williams	15	1972–73	Virginia Tech
4	Mike Leatherwood	14	1968–69	Furman
	Jerry Hoover	14	1971–72	Auburn
	Boyd Welsch	14	1968–69	Furman

== Steals ==
Career
Rk	Player	Steals	Seasons
1	Eddie Shannon	204	1995–96 1996–97 1997–98 1998–99
2	Dan Cross	198	1991–92 1992–93 1993–94 1994–95
	Brett Nelson	198	1999–2000 2000–01 2001–02 2002–03
4	Chris Chiozza	191	2014–15 2015–16 2016–17 2017–18
5	Kasey Hill	182	2013–14 2014–15 2015–16 2016–17
6	Dwayne Davis	178	1987–88 1988–89 1989–90 1990–91
7	Corey Brewer	176	2004–05 2005–06 2006–07
8	KeVaughn Allen	170	2015–16 2016–17 2017–18 2018–19
9	Scottie Wilbekin	167	2010–11 2011–12 2012–13 2013–14
10	Andrew Moten	165	1983–84 1984–85 1985–86 1986–87

Season
Rk	Player	Steals	Season
1	Dan Cross	76	1993–94
2	Corey Brewer	69	2006–07
3	Nick Calathes	68	2008–09
4	Will Richard	66	2024–25
5	Chris Chiozza	65	2017–18
6	Dwayne Davis	63	1990–91
7	Orien Greene	61	2001–02
	Boogie Fland	61	2025–26
9	Brett Nelson	60	1999–00
	Kasey Hill	60	2016–17

Single game
Rk	Player	Steals	Season	Opponent
1	Boogie Fland	8	2025–26	Alabama
	Clifford Lett	8	1988–89	Georgia
3	Dan Werner	7	2007–08	Georgia
	Brett Nelson	7	1999–00	VMI
	Eddie Shannon	7	1998–99	LSU
	Kenyan Weaks	7	1998–99	Morehead State
	Dan Cross	7	1993–94	Georgia
	Andrew DeClercq	7	1992–93	Jacksonville
	Stacey Poole	7	1991–92	Wichita State
	Hosie Grimsley	7	1989–90	Tennessee

== Blocks ==
Career
Rk	Player	Blocks	Seasons
1	Dwayne Schintzius	272	1986–87 1987–88 1988–89 1989–90
2	Kevarrius Hayes	214	2015–16 2016–17 2017–18 2018–19
3	Colin Castleton	194	2020–21 2021–22 2022–23
4	Al Horford	189	2004–05 2005–06 2006–07
5	Joakim Noah	186	2004–05 2005–06 2006–07
6	Andrew DeClercq	176	1991–92 1992–93 1993–94 1994–95
7	Dwayne Davis	160	1987–88 1988–89 1989–90 1990–91
	Patric Young	160	2010–11 2011–12 2012–13 2013–14
9	Eugene McDowell	150	1981–82 1982–83 1983–84 1984–85
10	Alex Condon	142	2023–24 2024–25 2025–26

Season
Rk	Player	Blocks	Season
1	Dwayne Schintzius	96	1986–87
2	Joakim Noah	95	2005–06
3	Dwayne Schintzius	90	1987–88
4	Colin Castleton	78	2022–23
5	Joakim Noah	72	2006–07
6	Al Horford	70	2006–07
7	Al Horford	68	2005–06
8	Kevarrius Hayes	67	2017–18
	Kevarrius Hayes	67	2018–19
10	Colin Castleton	62	2021–22

Single game
Rk	Player	Blocks	Season	Opponent
1	Dwayne Davis	9	1989–90	New Orleans
