= 2011–12 Florida Gators men's basketball team =

American college basketball season

2011–12 Florida Gators men's basketball

NCAA tournament, Elite Eight
- Conference: Southeastern Conference

Ranking
- Coaches: No. 9
- AP: No. 25
- Record: 26–11 (10–6 SEC)
- Head coach: Billy Donovan (16th season)
- Assistant coach: Matt McCall; John Pelphrey; Norm Roberts
- Home arena: O'Connell Center

2011–12 Southeastern Conference men's basketball standings
	Conf.				Overall
Team	W		L	PCT	W		L	PCT
No. 1 Kentucky	16	–	0	1.000	38	–	2	.950
No. 25 Florida	10	–	6	.625	26	–	11	.703
No. 20 Vanderbilt †	10	–	6	.625	25	–	11	.694
Tennessee	10	–	6	.625	19	–	15	.559
Alabama	9	–	7	.563	21	–	12	.636
Mississippi State	8	–	8	.500	21	–	12	.636
Ole Miss	8	–	8	.500	20	–	14	.588
LSU	7	–	9	.438	18	–	15	.545
Arkansas	6	–	10	.375	18	–	14	.563
Auburn	5	–	11	.313	15	–	16	.484
Georgia	5	–	11	.313	15	–	17	.469
South Carolina	2	–	14	.125	10	–	21	.323
† 2012 SEC tournament winner As of April 2, 2012; Rankings from AP poll

The 2011–12 Florida Gators men's basketball team represented the University of Florida in the sport of basketball during the 2011–12 college basketball season. The Gators competed in Division I of the National Collegiate Athletic Association (NCAA) and the Southeastern Conference (SEC). They were led by head coach Billy Donovan, and played their home games in the O'Connell Center on the university's Gainesville, Florida campus.

The Gators finished the SEC regular season with a 10–6 conference record, and lost to Kentucky in the semifinals of the 2012 SEC tournament. They received an at-large bid to the 2012 NCAA tournament as a No. 7 seed in the West Region, where they advanced to the Elite Eight before losing to Louisville.

== Previous season ==
The Gators finished the 2010–11 season 29–8, 13–3 in SEC play and lost in the Elite Eight round of the NCAA tournament to Butler. Senior small forward Chandler Parsons won SEC Player of the Year honors, and head coach Billy Donovan was named SEC Coach of the Year. Parsons and senior power forward Vernon Macklin were both selected in the 2011 NBA draft.

== Roster ==
Retrieved from Gatorzone.com

2011–12 Florida Gators men's basketball team
Players
Coaches

Pos.	#	Name	Height	Weight	Year	Hometown
G	23	Bradley Beal	6 ft 3 in (1.91 m)	207 lb (94 kg)	Fr	St. Louis, Missouri
G	1	Kenny Boynton	6 ft 2 in (1.88 m)	189 lb (86 kg)	Jr	Pompano Beach, Florida
G	0	Jacob Kurtz	6 ft 5 in (1.96 m)	195 lb (88 kg)	Fr	Oviedo, Florida
F	34	Cody Larson	6 ft 9 in (2.06 m)	231 lb (105 kg)	RS Fr	Sioux Falls, South Dakota
F	33	Erik Murphy	6 ft 10 in (2.08 m)	230 lb (104 kg)	Jr	South Kingstown, Rhode Island
F	35	Walter Pitchford	6 ft 10 in (2.08 m)	221 lb (100 kg)	Fr	Grand Rapids, Michigan
G/F	24	Casey Prather	6 ft 6 in (1.98 m)	212 lb (96 kg)	So	Jackson, Tennessee
G	3	Mike Rosario	6 ft 3 in (1.91 m)	191 lb (87 kg)	RS Jr	Jersey City, New Jersey
G	11	Erving Walker	5 ft 8 in (1.73 m)	177 lb (80 kg)	Sr	Brooklyn, New York
G	5	Scottie Wilbekin	6 ft 2 in (1.88 m)	178 lb (81 kg)	So	Gainesville, Florida
F	15	Will Yeguete	6 ft 7 in (2.01 m)	222 lb (101 kg)	So	Bordeaux, FRA
F/C	4	Patric Young	6 ft 9 in (2.06 m)	247 lb (112 kg)	So	Jacksonville, Florida

Head coach

Billy Donovan

Assistant coach(es)

Matt McCall
John Pelphrey
Norm Roberts

Legend

- (C) Team captain
- (S) Suspended
- (I) Ineligible
- (W) Walk-on
- Injured
- Current redshirt

=== Coaches ===
Name	Position	College	Graduating year
Billy Donovan	Head coach	Providence College	1987
Matt McCall	Associate head coach	University of Florida	2005
John Pelphrey	Assistant coach	University of Kentucky	1992
Norm Roberts	Assistant coach	Queens College	1987
Darren Hertz	Assistant to the head coach	University of Florida	1997
Oliver Winterbone	Video coordinator	Rutgers University	2005
Preston Greene	Strength & conditioning coordinator	Clemson University	1999
Dave Werner	Athletic trainer	Eastern Kentucky University	1991
Tom Williams	Academic counselor	University of Florida	1978
Denver Parler	Communications		

== Team statistics ==
As of March 24, 2012.
Indicates team leader in specific category.
Retrieved from Gatorzone.com

Name	PTS	PPG	FG %	3P %	FT %	AST	REB	BLK	STL
Bradley Beal	546	14.8	.445	.339	.769	83	249	31	51
Kenny Boynton	588	15.9	.440	.407	.754	100	97	1	28
Jacob Kurtz	2	0.5	–	–	1.000	0	1	0	0
Cody Larson	12	0.5	.455	.000	.400	1	21	2	0
Erik Murphy	356	10.5	.485	.421	.814	29	154	37	18
Walter Pitchford	6	0.5	.273	.000	–	1	4	1	0
Casey Prather	57	2.0	.367	.400	.393	8	49	8	12
Mike Rosario	205	6.6	.430	.337	.750	30	43	2	16
Erving Walker	447	12.1	.394	.363	.815	170	106	0	37
Scottie Wilbekin	97	2.6	.434	.457	.714	61	55	2	22
Will Yeguete	114	4.4	.581	–	.359	27	163	10	31
Patric Young	378	10.2	.618	–	.593	41	238	30	18
TEAM	2808	75.9	.463	.380	.713	551	1321	124	233

== Schedule and results ==
Retrieved from Gatorzone.com

Date time, TV	Rank^{#}	Opponent^{#}	Result	Record	Site city, state
Exhibition
Nov. 3, 2011*; 7:00 p.m., GatorVision	No. 8	Catholic	W 114–57		O'Connell Center; Gainesville, Florida
Regular season (non-conference play)
Nov. 11, 2011*; 7:00 p.m., FSFL	No. 8	Jackson State; Global Sports Shootout	W 99–59	1–0	O'Connell Center; Gainesville, Florida
Nov. 15, 2011*; 8:00 p.m., ESPN2	No. 7	at No. 3 Ohio State; Global Sports Shootout	L 74–81	1–1	Value City Arena; Columbus, Ohio
Nov. 17, 2011*; 8:00 p.m., FSFL	No. 7	North Florida; Global Sports Shootout	W 91–55	2–1	O'Connell Center; Gainesville, Florida
Nov. 21, 2011*; 7:00 p.m., Sun Sports	No. 10	vs. Wright State; Global Sports Shootout	W 78–65	3–1	St. Pete Times Forum; Tampa, Florida
Nov. 25, 2011*; 7:00 p.m., FSFL	No. 10	Jacksonville	W 107–62	4–1	O'Connell Center; Gainesville, Florida
Nov. 28, 2011*; 7:00 p.m., Sun Sports	No. 10	vs. Stetson; Florida Citrus Sports Shootout	W 96–70	5–1	Amway Center; Orlando, Florida
Dec. 2, 2011*; 7:00 p.m., ESPN	No. 10	at No. 4 Syracuse; SEC–Big East Challenge	L 68–72	5–2	Carrier Dome; Syracuse, New York
Dec. 7, 2011*; 7:00 p.m., ESPN	No. 12	Arizona	W 78–72 ^{OT}	6–2	O'Connell Center; Gainesville, Florida
Dec. 9, 2011*; 7:00 p.m., CSS/ESPN3	No. 12	vs. Rider	W 90–69	7–2	Veterans Memorial Arena; Jacksonville, Florida
Dec. 17, 2011*; 2:30 p.m., FSN/Sun	No. 13	vs. No. 22 Texas A&M; Orange Bowl Basketball Classic	W 84–64	8–2	BankAtlantic Center; Sunrise, Florida
Dec. 19, 2011*; 7:00 p.m., FSFL	No. 11	Mississippi Valley State	W 82–54	9–2	O'Connell Center; Gainesville, Florida
Dec. 22, 2011*; 7:00 p.m., ESPNU	No. 11	Florida State	W 82–64	10–2	O'Connell Center; Gainesville, Florida
Dec. 29, 2011*; 7:00 p.m., ESPN2	No. 10	at Rutgers	L 83–85 ^{2OT}	10–3	Louis Brown Athletic Center; Piscataway, New Jersey
Dec. 31, 2011*; 2:00 p.m., ESPNU	No. 10	Yale	W 90–70	11–3	O'Connell Center; Gainesville, Florida
Jan. 3, 2012*; 7:00 p.m., FSN	No. 13	UAB	W 79–60	12–3	O'Connell Center; Gainesville, Florida
Regular season (SEC conference play)
Jan. 7, 2012; 11:00 a.m., ESPN2	No. 13	at Tennessee	L 56–67	12–4 (0–1)	Thompson–Boling Arena; Knoxville, Tennessee
Jan. 10, 2012; 7:00 p.m., ESPN	No. 19	Georgia	W 70–48	13–4 (1–1)	O'Connell Center; Gainesville, Florida
Jan. 14, 2012; 7:00 p.m., CSS	No. 19	at South Carolina	W 79–65	14–4 (2–1)	Colonial Life Arena; Columbia, South Carolina
Jan. 21, 2012; 6:00 p.m., FSN	No. 17	LSU	W 76–64	15–4 (3–1)	O'Connell Center; Gainesville, Florida
Jan. 26, 2012; 7:00 p.m., ESPN2	No. 14	at Ole Miss	W 64–60	16–4 (4–1)	Tad Smith Coliseum; Oxford, Mississippi
Jan. 28, 2012; 1:30 p.m., SECN	No. 14	No. 18 Mississippi State	W 69–57	17–4 (5–1)	O'Connell Center; Gainesville, Florida
Feb. 2, 2012; 9:00 p.m., ESPN2	No. 12	South Carolina	W 74–66	18–4 (6–1)	O'Connell Center; Gainesville, Florida
Feb. 4, 2012; 1:00 p.m., CBS	No. 12	No. 25 Vanderbilt	W 73–65	19–4 (7–1)	O'Connell Center; Gainesville, Florida
Feb. 7, 2012; 7:00 p.m., ESPN	No. 8	at No. 1 Kentucky	L 58–78	19–5 (7–2)	Rupp Arena; Lexington, Kentucky
Feb. 11, 2012; 4:00 p.m., SECN	No. 8	Tennessee	L 70–75	19–6 (7–3)	O'Connell Center; Gainesville, Florida
Feb. 14, 2012; 7:00 p.m., ESPN	No. 14	at Alabama	W 61–52	20–6 (8–3)	Coleman Coliseum; Tuscaloosa, Alabama
Feb. 18, 2012; 6:00 p.m., ESPN2	No. 14	at Arkansas	W 98–68	21–6 (9–3)	Bud Walton Arena; Fayetteville, Arkansas
Feb. 21, 2012; 7:00 p.m., ESPNU	No. 12	Auburn	W 63–47	22–6 (10–3)	O'Connell Center; Gainesville, Florida
Feb. 25, 2012; 4:00 p.m., SECN	No. 12	at Georgia	L 62–76	22–7 (10–4)	Stegeman Coliseum; Athens, Georgia
Feb. 28, 2012; 9:00 p.m., ESPN	No. 16	at Vanderbilt	L 67–77	22–8 (10–5)	Memorial Gymnasium; Nashville, Tennessee
Mar. 4, 2012; 12:00 p.m., CBS	No. 16	No. 1 Kentucky	L 59–74	22–9 (10–6)	O'Connell Center; Gainesville, Florida
SEC tournament
Mar. 9, 2012; 3:30 p.m., SECN	(4) No. 22	vs. (5) Alabama; Quarterfinals	W 66–63	23–9	New Orleans Arena; New Orleans, Louisiana
Mar. 10, 2012; 1:00 p.m., ABC	(4) No. 22	vs. (1) No. 1 Kentucky; Semifinals	L 71–74	23–10	New Orleans Arena; New Orleans, Louisiana
NCAA tournament
Mar. 16, 2012; 2:10 p.m., TNT	(7 W) No. 25	vs. (10 W) Virginia; Second round	W 71–45	24–10	CenturyLink Center; Omaha, Nebraska
Mar. 18, 2012; 6:10 p.m., TNT	(7 W) No. 25	vs. (15 W) Norfolk State; Third round	W 84–50	25–10	CenturyLink Center; Omaha, Nebraska
Mar. 22, 2012; 10:17 p.m., TBS	(7 W) No. 25	vs. (3 W) No. 11 Marquette; Sweet Sixteen	W 68–58	26–10	US Airways Center; Phoenix, Arizona
Mar. 24, 2012; 4:30 p.m., CBS	(7 W) No. 25	vs. (4 W) No. 17 Louisville; Elite Eight	L 68–72	26–11	US Airways Center; Phoenix, Arizona
*Non-Conference Game. Rankings from AP poll. All times are in Eastern Time. ( ) Tournament seedings in parentheses.

== Rankings ==
Ranking movement Legend: ██ Increase in ranking. ██ Decrease in ranking. NR = Not ranked. RV = Received votes.
Poll	Pre	Wk 1 Nov 14	Wk 2 Nov 21	Wk 3 Nov 28	Wk 4 Dec 5	Wk 5 Dec 12	Wk 6 Dec 19	Wk 7 Dec 26	Wk 8 Jan 2	Wk 9 Jan 9	Wk 10 Jan 16	Wk 11 Jan 23	Wk 12 Jan 30	Wk 13 Feb 6	Wk 14 Feb 13	Wk 15 Feb 20	Wk 16 Feb 27	Wk 17 Mar 5	Wk 18 Mar 12	Final Apr 2
AP	8	7	10	10	12	13	11	10	13	19	17	14	12	8	14	12	16	22	25	-
Coaches	10	8	9	9	12	13	12	10	14	19	14	13	11	7	12	11	13	19	21	9

== Awards and honors ==
Bradley Beal

- SEC Freshman of the Week (11/21/11–11/28/11). Beal averaged 8.5 points, seven rebounds, two assists and 1.5 steals in two wins over Wright State and Jacksonville.
- SEC Freshman of the Week (12/5/11–12/12/11). Beal averaged 13.5 points and five rebounds in two wins over Arizona and Rider.
- SEC Freshman of the Week (12/19/11–12/26/11). Beal averaged 17 points, six rebounds, two steals and one assist in two wins over Mississippi Valley State and Florida State.
- SEC Freshman of the Week (1/23/12–1/30/12). Beal averaged 14 points, three rebounds and 2.5 assists in two wins over Ole Miss and Mississippi State.
- SEC Freshman of the Week (1/31/12–2/6/12). Beal averaged 16.5 points, nine rebounds and two assists in two wins over South Carolina and Vanderbilt.
- SEC Freshman of the Week (2/13/12–2/20/12). Beal averaged 17.5 points, 8.5 rebounds and three assists in two road wins over Alabama and Arkansas.
- First-Team All-SEC
- SEC All-Freshman Team

Kenny Boynton

- SEC Player of the Week (12/12/11–12/19/11). Boynton scored 22 points, two assists, one rebound and a steal in a win over Texas A&M.
- First-Team All-SEC

Erving Walker

- Second-Team All-SEC

Will Yeguete

- 2012 SEC Community Service Team

Patric Young

- SEC Player of the Week (12/5/11–12/12/11). Young averaged 18.5 points on 77.3 percent shooting (17–22) and 10 rebounds in two wins over Arizona and Rider.
- SEC Scholar-Athlete of the Year
