= 2011–12 Southeastern Conference men's basketball season =

2011–12 SEC Men's Basketball Season
- League: NCAA Division I
- Sport: Basketball
- Teams: 12
- TV partner(s): CBS, ESPN, FSN

Regular Season
- 2012 SEC Champions: Kentucky
- Runners-up: Vanderbilt
- Season MVP: Anthony Davis, Kentucky

SEC tournament
- Venue: New Orleans Arena, New Orleans, Louisiana
- Champions: Vanderbilt
- Runners-up: Kentucky
- Finals MVP: John Jenkins, Vanderbilt

Basketball seasons
- ← 2010–11 2012–13 →

2011–12 Southeastern Conference men's basketball standings
	Conf.				Overall
Team	W		L	PCT	W		L	PCT
No. 1 Kentucky	16	–	0	1.000	38	–	2	.950
No. 25 Florida	10	–	6	.625	26	–	11	.703
No. 20 Vanderbilt †	10	–	6	.625	25	–	11	.694
Tennessee	10	–	6	.625	19	–	15	.559
Alabama	9	–	7	.563	21	–	12	.636
Mississippi State	8	–	8	.500	21	–	12	.636
Ole Miss	8	–	8	.500	20	–	14	.588
LSU	7	–	9	.438	18	–	15	.545
Arkansas	6	–	10	.375	18	–	14	.563
Auburn	5	–	11	.313	15	–	16	.484
Georgia	5	–	11	.313	15	–	17	.469
South Carolina	2	–	14	.125	10	–	21	.323
† 2012 SEC tournament winner As of April 2, 2012; Rankings from AP poll

The 2011–12 Southeastern Conference men's basketball season began with practices on October 15, 2011, and ended with the SEC Tournament on March 8–11, 2012 at the New Orleans Arena in New Orleans.

This was the first season for the SEC's one-division alignment in men's basketball. The league's head coaches voted at the league's annual meeting on June 1, 2011, to eliminate the divisional format, starting with the 2011–12 season.

== Pre-season polls and teams ==
Pre-Season Poll:

	SEC Media
1.	Kentucky (18)
2.	Vanderbilt (4)
3.	Florida (1)
4.	Alabama
5.	Mississippi State
6.	Arkansas
7.	Ole Miss
8.	Georgia
9.	LSU
10.	Auburn
11.	Tennessee
12.	South Carolina

Pre-Season All-SEC Teams

SEC Media	SEC Coaches
Dee Bost Mississippi State; JaMychal Green Alabama; John Jenkins Vanderbilt; **Terrence Jones Kentucky**; Jeffery Taylor Vanderbilt	

- SEC Coaches select 8 players
- Players in bold are choices for SEC Player of the Year

== Rankings ==
Legend
Increase in ranking
Decrease in ranking
Not ranked previous week

		Pre	Wk 2	Wk 3	Wk 4	Wk 5	Wk 6	Wk 7	Wk 8	Wk 9	Wk 10	Wk 11	Wk 12	Wk 13	Wk 14	Wk 15	Wk 16	Wk 17	Wk 18	Wk 19	Final
Alabama	AP	17	16	13	12	16	23	RV	RV	RV	RV	RV									
Alabama	C	15	21	RV	RV	RV	RV	RV													
Arkansas	AP										RV										
Arkansas	C																				
Auburn	AP																				
Auburn	C																				
Florida	AP	8	7	10	10	12	13	11	10	13	19	17	14	12	8	14	12	16	22	25	
Florida	C	10	8	9	9	12	13	12	10	14	19	14	13	11	7	12	11	13	19	21	9
Georgia	AP																				
Georgia	C																				
Kentucky	AP	2	2	2	1	1	3	3	3	2	2	2	1	1	1	1	1	1	1	1	
Kentucky	C	2	2	2	1	1	3	3	3	2	2	2	1	1	1	1	1	1	1	1	1
LSU	AP																				
LSU	C																				
Mississippi State	AP			24	21	17	17	18	15	15	20	18	18	22	20	RV					
Mississippi State	C			RV	24	18	16	17	14	16	20	15	16	19	18	23		RV	RV		
Ole Miss	AP																				
Ole Miss	C																				
South Carolina	AP																				
South Carolina	C																				
Tennessee	AP																				
Tennessee	C																				
Vanderbilt	AP	7	18	18	20	RV	RV	RV	RV	RV	RV	RV	RV	25	RV	RV	RV	RV	RV	20	
Vanderbilt	C	7	20	22	19	RV	RV	RV	RV	RV	RV	RV	RV	RV	RV		RV	RV	RV	24	19

== Conference schedules ==
=== Composite matrix ===
This table summarizes the head-to-head results between teams in conference play. (x) indicates games remaining this season.

	Alabama	Arkansas	Auburn	Florida	Georgia	Kentucky	LSU	Mississippi State	Ole Miss	South Carolina	Tennessee	Vanderbilt
vs. Alabama	–	0–2	0–2	1–0	0–1	1–0	1–1	1–1	1–1	1–0	0–1	1–0
vs. Arkansas	2–0	–	0–2	1–0	1–0	1–0	1–1	1–1	2–0	0–1	1–0	0–1
vs. Auburn	2–0	2–0	–	1–0	0–1	1–0	1–1	1–1	1–1	0–1	1–0	1–0
vs. Florida	0–1	0–1	0–1	–	1–1	2–0	0–1	0–1	0–1	0–2	2–0	1–1
vs. Georgia	1–0	0–1	1–0	1–1	–	2–0	1–0	0–1	1–0	2–0	1–1	2–0
vs. Kentucky	0–1	0–1	0–1	0–2	0–2	–	0–1	0–1	0–1	0–2	0–2	0–2
vs. LSU	1–1	1–1	1–1	1–0	0–1	1–0	–	1–1	1–1	0–1	1–0	1–0
vs. Mississippi State	1–1	1–1	1–1	1–0	1–0	1–0	1–1	–	1–1	0–1	0–1	0–1
vs. Ole Miss	1–1	0–2	1–1	1–0	0–1	1–0	1–1	1–1	–	0–1	1–0	1–0
vs. South Carolina	0–1	1–0	1–0	2–0	0–2	2–0	1–0	1–0	1–0	–	2–0	2–0
vs. Tennessee	1–0	0–1	0–1	0–2	1–1	2–0	0–1	1–0	0–1	0–2	–	1–1
vs. Vanderbilt	0–1	1–0	0–1	1–1	0–2	2–0	0–1	1–0	0–1	0–2	1–1	–
Total	9–7	6–10	5–11	10–6	5–11	16–0	7–9	8–8	8–8	2–14	10–6	10–6

== Postseason ==
=== SEC tournament ===
Session	Game	Time*	Matchup^{#}	Television	Attendance
First Round - Thursday, March 8
1	1	12:00 PM	#8 LSU vs. #9 Arkansas	SEC Network	
1	2	2:30 PM	#5 Alabama vs. #12 South Carolina	SEC Network	
2	3	6:30 PM	#7 Ole Miss vs. #10 Auburn	SEC Network	
2	4	9:00 PM	#6 Mississippi State vs. #11 Georgia	SEC Network	
Quarterfinals - Friday, March 9
3	5	12:00 PM	#1 Kentucky vs. #8 LSU	SEC Network	
3	6	2:30 PM	#4 Florida vs. #5 Alabama	SEC Network	
4	7	6:30 PM	#2 Tennessee vs. #7 Ole Miss	SEC Network	
4	8	9:00 PM	#3 Vanderbilt vs. #11 Georgia	SEC Network	
Semifinals - Saturday, March 10
5	9	12:00 PM	#1 Kentucky vs. #4 Florida	ABC	
5	10	2:30 PM	#7 Ole Miss vs. #3 Vanderbilt	ABC	
Championship Game - Sunday, March 11
6	11	12:00 PM	#1 Kentucky vs. #3 Vanderbilt	ABC	
*Game Times in CT. #-Rankings denote tournament seeding.

=== NCAA tournament ===
Seed	Region	School	First Four	Second round	Third round	Sweet 16	Elite Eight	Final Four	Championship
1	South	**Kentucky**		#16 WKU - **W, 81–66**	#8 Iowa State - **W, 87–71**	#4 Indiana - **W, 102–90**	#3 Baylor - **W, 82–70**	#4 Louisville – **W, 69-61**	#2 Kansas - **W, 67-59**
7	West	**Florida**		#10 Virginia – **W, 71-45**	#15 Norfolk State – **W, 84-50**	#3 Marquette - **W, 68-58**	#4 Louisville - **L, 68-72**		
5	East	**Vanderbilt**		#12 Harvard – **W, 79–70**	#4 Wisconsin – **L, 57-60**				
9	Midwest	**Alabama**		#8 Creighton – **L, 57-58**					

=== National Invitation Tournament ===
# of Bids	Record	Win %	R2	R3	SF	CG
4	1–4	.200	1	0	0	0

Team	Bid Type	Seed	Results
Tennessee	At-large	1	**W 65-51** vs. 8 Savannah State; **L 64-71** vs. 4 Middle Tennessee
Ole Miss	At-large	2	**L 93-96 (OT)** vs. 7 Illinois State
Mississippi State	At-large	4	**L 96-101 (2OT)** vs. 5 UMass
LSU	At-large	6	**L 74-96** vs. 3 Oregon

=== 2012 NBA draft ===
The following 1st & 2nd team All-SEC performers were listed as seniors: Dee Bost, Jeffery Taylor, JaMychal Green, Erving Walker, Terrance Henry. The deadline for entering the NBA draft is April 29, but once one has declared, the deadline for withdrawing the declaration and retaining NCAA eligibility is April 10. The deadline for submitting information to the NBA Advisory Committee for a 72-hour response is April 3.

The following SEC underclassmen have sought the advice of the NBA's undergraduate advisory committee to determine his draft prospects:
The following SEC underclassmen declared early for the 2011 draft: Renardo Sidney, Justin Hamilton Arnett Moultrie, B. J. Young, John Jenkins, Bradley Beal, Anthony Davis, Michael Kidd-Gilchrist, Marquis Teague, Terrence Jones and Doron Lamb
The following SEC underclassmen entered their name in the draft but who did not hire agents and opted to return to college: B. J. Young

Round	Pick	Player	Position	Nationality	Team	School/club team
1	1	Anthony Davis	PF	United States	New Orleans Hornets	Kentucky (Fr.)
1	2	Michael Kidd-Gilchrist	SF	United States	Charlotte Bobcats	Kentucky (Fr.)
1	3	Bradley Beal	SG	United States	Washington Wizards	Florida (Fr.)
1	18	Terrence Jones	PF	United States	Houston Rockets	Kentucky (So.)
1	23	John Jenkins	SG	United States	Atlanta Hawks	Vanderbilt (Jr.)
1	27	Arnett Moultrie	PF	United States	Miami Heat	Mississippi St. (Jr.)
1	29	Marquis Teague	PG	United States	Chicago Bulls	Kentucky (Fr.)
1	30	Festus Ezeli	C	Nigeria	Golden State Warriors	Vanderbilt (Sr.)
2	31	Jeffery Taylor	SF	Sweden	Charlotte Bobcats	Vanderbilt (Sr.)
2	42	Doron Lamb	SG	United States	Milwaukee Bucks	Kentucky (So.)
2	45	Justin Hamilton	C	United States	Philadelphia 76ers	LSU (Jr.)
2	46	Darius Miller	SF	United States	New Orleans Hornets	Kentucky (Sr.)

== Awards and honors ==
=== All-Americans ===
Starting on March 6, the 2012 NCAA Men's Basketball All-Americans were released for 2011–12 season, based upon selections by the four major syndicates. The four syndicates include the Associated Press, USBWA, NABC, and Sporting News

AP

First Team

- Anthony Davis, Kentucky

Third Team

- Michael Kidd-Gilchrist, Kentucky
USBWA

First Team

- Anthony Davis, Kentucky

Second Team

- Michael Kidd-Gilchrist, Kentucky
NABC

First Team

- Anthony Davis, Kentucky

Third Team

- Michael Kidd-Gilchrist, Kentucky
Sporting News

First Team

- Anthony Davis, Kentucky

Second Team

- Michael Kidd-Gilchrist, Kentucky

=== All-SEC awards and teams ===
Voting was by conference coaches:

**2012 SEC Men's Basketball Individual Awards**
Award	Recipient(s)
Player of the Year	**Anthony Davis**, C., KENTUCKY
Coach of the Year	**John Calipari**, KENTUCKY
Defensive Player of the Year	**Anthony Davis**, C., KENTUCKY
Rookie of the Year	**Anthony Davis**, C., KENTUCKY
Scholar-Athlete of the Year	**Patric Young**, F., FLORIDA
Sixth Man Award	**Darius Miller**, F., KENTUCKY

**2012 All-SEC Men's Basketball Teams**
First Team	Second Team	All-Freshman Team	All-Defensive Team
Bradley Beal Fr., G, FLORIDA; Dee Bost Sr., G, MISS STATE; Kenny Boynton Jr., G, FLORIDA; Anthony Davis Fr., C, KENTUCKY; John Jenkins Jr., G, VANDERBILT; Michael Kidd-Gilchrist Fr., F, KENTUCKY; Arnett Moultrie Sr., F, MISSISSIPPI STATE; Jeffery Taylor Sr., F, VANDERBILT	JaMychal Green Sr., F, ALABAMA; Justin Hamilton Jr., F, LSU; Terrance Henry Jr., F, OLE MISS; Terrence Jones So., F, KENTUCKY; Doron Lamb So., G, KENTUCKY; Jeronne Maymon So., F, TENNESSEE; Trevor Releford So., G, ALABAMA; Erving Walker Sr., G, FLORIDA; B. J. Young Fr., G, ARKANSAS	Bradley Beal, G., FLORIDA; Kentavious Caldwell-Pope, G., GEORGIA; Anthony Davis, F., KENTUCKY; Anthony Hickey, G., LSU; Rodney Hood, F., MISS STATE; Michael Kidd-Gilchrist, F., KENTUCKY; Jarnell Stokes, F., TENNESSEE; B. J. Young, G., ARKANSAS	Reginald Buckner, F., OLE MISS; Anthony Davis, F., KENTUCKY; Damontre Harris, F., SOUTH CAROLINA; Michael Kidd-Gilchrist, F., KENTUCKY; Jeffery Taylor, F., VANDERBILT
† - denotes unanimous selection

=== All-Academic ===
First Team:

Player, School	Year	GPA	Major

Second Team:

Player, School	Year	GPA	Major

=== USBWA All-District team ===
On March 6, the U.S. Basketball Writers Association released its 2011–12 Men's All-District Teams, based on voting from its national membership. There were nine regions from coast to coast, and a player and coach of the year were selected in each. The following lists all the SEC representatives selected within their respective regions. (Note bold represents player of the year within that district)

District IV (KY, TN, MS, AL, GA, FL)
- Bradley Beal, Florida
- Kenny Boynton, Florida
- **Anthony Davis, Kentucky**
- John Jenkins, Vanderbilt
- Michael Kidd-Gilchrist, Kentucky
- Arnett Moultrie, Mississippi State
- Jeffery Taylor, Vanderbilt
