= 2010–11 Florida Gators men's basketball team =

American college basketball season

2010–11 Florida Gators men's basketball

SEC regular season and Eastern Division champions

NCAA tournament, Elite Eight
- Conference: Southeastern Conference
- East

Ranking
- Coaches: No. 10
- AP: No. 15
- Record: 29–8 (13–3 SEC)
- Head coach: Billy Donovan
- Assistant coach: Larry Shyatt; Richard Pitino; Rob Lanier
- Home arena: O'Connell Center

2010–11 Southeastern Conference men's basketball standings
| | Conf. | | | | Overall |
| Team | W | | L | PCT | W | | L | PCT |
|---|---|---|---|---|---|---|---|---|
East
| No. 15 Florida | 13 | – | 3 | .813 | 29 | – | 8 | .784 |
| No. 11 Kentucky † | 10 | – | 6 | .625 | 29 | – | 9 | .763 |
| No. 25 Vanderbilt | 9 | – | 7 | .563 | 23 | – | 11 | .676 |
| Georgia | 9 | – | 7 | .563 | 21 | – | 12 | .636 |
| Tennessee | 8 | – | 8 | .500 | 19 | – | 15 | .559 |
| South Carolina | 5 | – | 11 | .313 | 14 | – | 16 | .467 |
West
| Alabama | 12 | – | 4 | .750 | 25 | – | 12 | .676 |
| Mississippi State | 9 | – | 7 | .563 | 17 | – | 14 | .548 |
| Ole Miss | 7 | – | 9 | .438 | 20 | – | 14 | .588 |
| Arkansas | 7 | – | 9 | .438 | 18 | – | 13 | .581 |
| Auburn | 4 | – | 12 | .250 | 11 | – | 20 | .355 |
| LSU | 3 | – | 13 | .188 | 11 | – | 21 | .344 |
† 2011 SEC tournament winner As of April 2, 2011; Rankings from AP Poll

The 2010–11 Florida Gators men's basketball team represented the University of Florida in the sport of basketball during the 2010–11 college basketball season. The Gators competed in Division I of the National Collegiate Athletic Association (NCAA) and the Eastern Division of the Southeastern Conference (SEC). They were led by head coach Billy Donovan, and played their home games in the O'Connell Center on the university's Gainesville, Florida campus.

The Gators were the SEC regular season champions with a 13–3 conference record, but lost to Kentucky in the championship game of the 2011 SEC men's basketball tournament. Small forward Chandler Parsons earned SEC Player of the Year honors, and head coach Billy Donovan won the SEC Coach of the Year award. They received an at-large bid to the 2011 NCAA tournament as a No. 2 seed in southeast region, where they advanced to the Elite Eight before losing to Butler in overtime.

== Previous season ==
The Gators finished the season 21–13, 9–7 in SEC play and lost in the first round of the NCAA tournament to BYU.

=== Class of 2010 ===
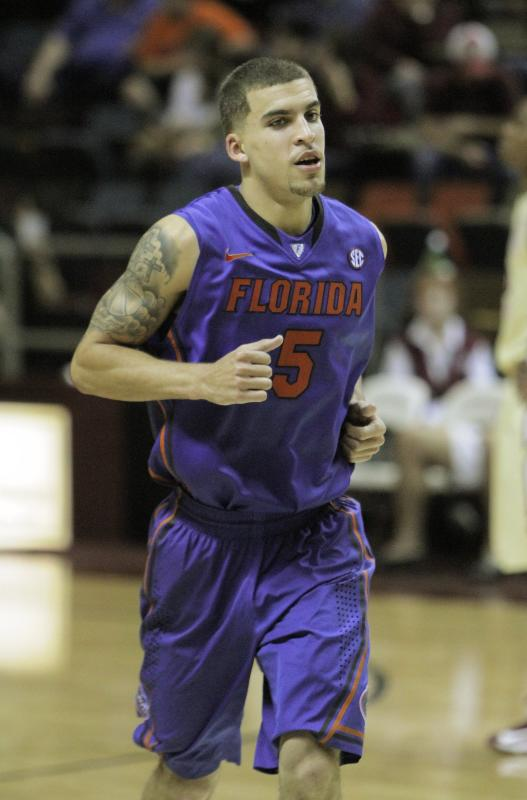
Scottie Wilbekin

College recruiting
| Name | Hometown | School | Height | Weight | Commit date |
|---|---|---|---|---|---|
| Cody Larson; PF | Sioux Falls, South Dakota | Roosevelt HS | 6 ft 9 in (2.06 m) | 225 lb (102 kg) | Apr 25, 2010 |
| Cody Larson; PF | Recruit ratings: Scout: Rivals: (92) | | | | |
| Casey Prather; SF | Jackson, Tennessee | North Side HS | 6 ft 5 in (1.96 m) | 185 lb (84 kg) | Sep 30, 2009 |
| Casey Prather; SF | Recruit ratings: Scout: Rivals: (95) | | | | |
| Scottie Wilbekin; PG | Gainesville, Florida | The Rock School | 6 ft 0 in (1.83 m) | 150 lb (68 kg) | Apr 25, 2010 |
| Scottie Wilbekin; PG | Recruit ratings: Scout: Rivals: (89) | | | | |
| Will Yeguete; PF | Bordeaux, France | Florida Air Academy | 6 ft 7 in (2.01 m) | 210 lb (95 kg) | Apr 19, 2010 |
| Will Yeguete; PF | Recruit ratings: Scout: Rivals: (84) | | | | |
| Patric Young; PF | Jacksonville, Florida | Providence HS | 6 ft 8 in (2.03 m) | 215 lb (98 kg) | Nov 15, 2008 |
| Patric Young; PF | Recruit ratings: Scout: Rivals: (96) | | | | |
Overall Recruiting Rankings: Scout – 14 Rivals – 19 ESPN – 9

== Roster ==
| Name | Number | Position | Height | Weight | Class | Hometown |
|---|---|---|---|---|---|---|
| Adam Allen | 14 | F | 6–8 | 225 | Redshirt Junior | Milton, Florida |
| Kenny Boynton | 1 | G | 6–2 | 183 | Sophomore | Pompano Beach, Florida |
| Cody Larson | 34 | F | 6–9 | 225 | Freshman | Sioux Falls, South Dakota |
| Vernon Macklin | 32 | F | 6–10 | 230 | Redshirt Senior | Portsmouth, Virginia |
| Kyle McClanahan | 20 | G | 6–1 | 185 | Junior | Maitland, Florida |
| Erik Murphy | 33 | F | 6–9 | 217 | Sophomore | South Kingstown, Rhode Island |
| Chandler Parsons | 25 | F | 6–9 | 213 | Senior | Winter Park, Florida |
| Casey Prather | 24 | G/F | 6–6 | 195 | Freshman | Jackson, Tennessee |
| Mike Rosario | 3 | G | 6–3 | 180 | Redshirt Junior | Jersey City, New Jersey |
| Alex Tyus | 23 | F | 6–8 | 220 | Senior | St. Louis, Missouri |
| Erving Walker | 11 | G | 5–8 | 161 | Junior | Brooklyn, New York |
| Scottie Wilbekin | 5 | G | 6–2 | 175 | Freshman | Gainesville, Florida |
| Will Yeguete | 15 | F | 6–7 | 210 | Freshman | Bordeaux, France |
| Patric Young | 4 | F/C | 6–9 | 245 | Freshman | Jacksonville, Florida |

=== Coaches ===
| Name | Position | College | Graduating year |
|---|---|---|---|
| Billy Donovan | Head coach | Providence College | 1987 |
| Larry Shyatt | Associate head coach | College of Wooster | 1973 |
| Richard Pitino | Assistant coach | Providence College | 1995 |
| Rob Lanier | Assistant coach | St. Bonaventure University | 1990 |
| Darren Hertz | Assistant to the head coach | University of Florida | 1997 |
| Adam Beaupre | Video coordinator | University of Florida | 1999 |
| Matt Herring | Strength & conditioning coordinator | Texas State University | 1994 |
| Dave Werner | Athletic trainer | Eastern Kentucky University | 1991 |
| Tom Williams | Academic counselor | University of Florida | 1978 |

== Team statistics ==
As of March 16, 2011.
Indicates team leader in specific category.

| Name | PTS | PPG | FG % | FT % | AST | REB | BLK | STL |
|---|---|---|---|---|---|---|---|---|
| Adam Allen | 0 | 0 | .000 | .000 | 0 | 0 | 0 | 0 |
| Kenny Boynton | 466 | 14.1 | .377 | .817 | 84 | 50 | 8 | 26 |
| Cody Larson | Redshirt | | | | | | | |
| Vernon Macklin | 374 | 11.3 | .574 | .449 | 26 | 183 | 24 | 10 |
| Kyle McClanahan | 4 | 0.6 | .333 | .500 | 2 | 3 | 1 | 3 |
| Erik Murphy | 125 | 4.3 | .511 | .750 | 8 | 70 | 15 | 5 |
| Chandler Parsons | 369 | 11.5 | .496 | .559 | 112 | 251 | 12 | 30 |
| Casey Prather | 38 | 1.2 | .459 | .000 | 12 | 35 | 2 | 7 |
| Mike Rosario | Ineligible for 2010–11 (transfer) | | | | | | | |
| Alex Tyus | 277 | 8.7 | .483 | .635 | 27 | 176 | 24 | 13 |
| Erving Walker | 476 | 14.4 | .411 | .784 | 108 | 98 | 0 | 37 |
| Scottie Wilbekin | 88 | 2.7 | .388 | .565 | 56 | 50 | 1 | 33 |
| Will Yeguete | 36 | 1.3 | .375 | .444 | 7 | 76 | 2 | 11 |
| Patric Young | 108 | 3.3 | .566 | .710 | 11 | 123 | 28 | 19 |

== Schedule and results ==
Retrieved from Gatorzone.com

| Date time, TV | Rank^{#} | Opponent^{#} | Result | Record | Site city, state |
Exhibition
| October 28, 2010*; 7:00 p.m. | No. 9 | Florida Tech | W 92–58 | | O'Connell Center; Gainesville, FL |
| November 3, 2010*; 7:00 p.m. | No. 9 | Georgetown | W 88–62 | | O'Connell Center; Gainesville, FL |
Regular season (non-conference play)
| November 12, 2010*; 7:00 p.m., Sun Sports | No. 9 | UNC Wilmington; Global Sports Invitational | W 77–60 | 1–0 | O'Connell Center; Gainesville, FL |
| November 16, 2010*; 6:00 p.m., ESPN | No. 9 | No. 4 Ohio State; Global Sports Invitational | L 75–93 | 1–1 | O'Connell Center; Gainesville, FL |
| November 18, 2010*; 7:00 p.m., Sun/FSFL | No. 9 | North Carolina A&T; Global Sports Invitational | W 105–55 | 2–1 | O'Connell Center; Gainesville, FL |
| November 21, 2010*; 3:30 p.m., Sun Sports | No. 9 | Morehead State; Global Sports Invitational | W 61–55 | 3–1 | O'Connell Center; Gainesville, FL |
| November 23, 2010*; 7:00 p.m., Sun Sports | No. 16 | Florida Atlantic | W 79–66 | 4–1 | O'Connell Center; Gainesville, FL |
| November 28, 2010*; 7:30 p.m., FSN/Sun | No. 16 | at Florida State | W 55–51 | 5–1 | Donald L. Tucker Center; Tallahassee, FL |
| December 1, 2010*; 7:00 p.m., FSN/FSFL | No. 18 | vs. UCF; Florida Citrus Sports Shootout | L 54–57 | 5–2 | Amway Center; Orlando, FL |
| December 5, 2010*; 2:30 p.m., Sun/MASN | No. 18 | vs. American; BB&T Classic | W 67–48 | 6–2 | Verizon Center; Washington, D.C. |
| December 9, 2010*; 7:00 p.m., ESPN2 | | Kent State | W 65–52 | 7–2 | O'Connell Center; Gainesville, FL |
| December 18, 2010*; 3:30 p.m., FSFL | | vs. No. 6 Kansas State; Orange Bowl Basketball Classic | W 57–44 | 8–2 | BankAtlantic Center; Sunrise, FL |
| December 20, 2010*; 1:00 p.m., Sun Sports | No. 20 | Jacksonville | L 68–71 ^{OT} | 8–3 | O'Connell Center; Gainesville, FL |
| December 22, 2010*; 7:00 p.m., CSS | No. 20 | Radford | W 66–55 | 9–3 | O'Connell Center; Gainesville, FL |
| December 28, 2010*; 7:00 p.m., ESPNU | No. 20 | Fairfield | Cancelled^{[a]} | | O'Connell Center; Gainesville, FL |
| December 31, 2010*; 4:00 p.m., ESPN2 | | at Xavier | W 71–67 | 10–3 | Cintas Center; Cincinnati, OH |
| January 3, 2011*; 9:00 p.m., ESPNU | | Rhode Island | W 84–59 | 11–3 | O'Connell Center; Gainesville, FL |
Regular season (SEC conference play)
| January 8, 2011; 8:00 p.m., CSS | | Ole Miss | W 77–71 | 12–3 (1–0) | O'Connell Center; Gainesville, FL |
| January 11, 2011; 9:00 p.m., ESPN | | at Tennessee | W 81–75 ^{OT} | 13–3 (2–0) | Thompson–Boling Arena; Knoxville, TN |
| January 15, 2011; 1:30 p.m., SECN | | South Carolina | L 69–72 | 13–4 (2–1) | O'Connell Center; Gainesville, FL |
| January 20, 2011; 7:00 p.m., ESPN | | at Auburn | W 45–40 | 14–4 (3–1) | Auburn Arena; Auburn, AL |
| January 22, 2011; 8:00 p.m., FSN | | Arkansas | W 75–43 | 15–4 (4–1) | O'Connell Center; Gainesville, FL |
| January 25, 2011; 7:00 p.m., ESPN | No. 24 | at Georgia | W 104–91 ^{2OT} | 16–4 (5–1) | Stegeman Coliseum; Athens, GA |
| January 29, 2011; 1:00 p.m., CBS | No. 24 | at Mississippi State | L 64–71 | 16–5 (5–2) | Humphrey Coliseum; Starkville, MS |
| February 1, 2011; 9:00 p.m., ESPN | | No. 23 Vanderbilt | W 65–61 ^{OT} | 17–5 (6–2) | O'Connell Center; Gainesville, FL |
| February 5, 2011; 9:00 p.m., ESPN | | No. 10 Kentucky; ESPN College GameDay | W 70–68 | 18–5 (7–2) | O'Connell Center; Gainesville, FL |
| February 9, 2011; 8:00 p.m., SECN | No. 17 | at South Carolina | W 79–60 | 19–5 (8–2) | Colonial Life Arena; Columbia, SC |
| February 12, 2011; 6:00 p.m., ESPN | No. 17 | Tennessee | W 61–60 | 20–5 (9–2) | O'Connell Center; Gainesville, FL |
| February 20, 2011; 1:00 p.m., ESPN | No. 14 | at LSU | W 68–61 | 21–5 (10–2) | Pete Maravich Assembly Center; Baton Rouge, LA |
| February 24, 2011; 7:00 p.m., ESPN2 | No. 13 | Georgia | W 71–62 | 22–5 (11–2) | O'Connell Center; Gainesville, FL |
| February 26, 2011; 4:00 p.m., CBS | No. 13 | at No. 22 Kentucky | L 68–76 | 22–6 (11–3) | Rupp Arena; Lexington, KY |
| March 1, 2011; 7:00 p.m., ESPNU | No. 14 | Alabama | W 78–51 | 23–6 (12–3) | O'Connell Center; Gainesville, FL |
| March 5, 2011; 6:00 p.m., ESPN | No. 14 | at No. 21 Vanderbilt | W 86–76 | 24–6 (13–3) | Memorial Gymnasium; Nashville, TN |
SEC tournament
| March 11, 2011; 7:30 p.m., SECN | (1) No. 12 | vs. (5) Tennessee; Quarterfinals | W 85–74 | 25–6 | Georgia Dome; Atlanta, GA |
| March 12, 2011; 3:30 p.m., ABC | (1) No. 12 | vs. (3) No. 24 Vanderbilt; Semifinals | W 77–66 | 26–6 | Georgia Dome; Atlanta, GA |
| March 13, 2011; 1:00 p.m., ABC | (1) No. 12 | vs. (2) No. 15 Kentucky; Championship Game | L 54–70 | 26–7 | Georgia Dome; Atlanta, GA |
NCAA tournament
| March 17, 2011*; 6:50 p.m., TBS | (2 SE) No. 15 | vs. (15 SE) UC Santa Barbara; Second round | W 79–51 | 27–7 | St. Pete Times Forum; Tampa, FL |
| March 19, 2011*; 2:45 p.m., CBS | (2 SE) No. 15 | vs. (7 SE) UCLA; Third round | W 73–65 | 28–7 | St. Pete Times Forum; Tampa, FL |
| March 24, 2011*; 7:27 p.m., TBS | (2 SE) No. 15 | vs. (3 SE) No. 10 BYU; Sweet Sixteen | W 83–74 ^{OT} | 29–7 | New Orleans Arena; New Orleans, LA |
| March 26, 2011*; 4:20 p.m., CBS | (2 SE) No. 15 | vs. (8 SE) Butler; Elite Eight | L 71–74 ^{OT} | 29–8 | New Orleans Arena; New Orleans, LA |
*Non-conference game. ^{#}Rankings from AP Poll. (#) Tournament seedings in parentheses. SE=NCAA Southeast Region. All times are in Eastern Time.

NOTES

^{^[a]}The game on Dec. 28 against Fairfield University was canceled due to a heavy snowstorm that prevented Fairfield (Connecticut) from traveling to Gainesville.

== Rankings ==
Ranking movement Legend: ██ Increase in ranking. ██ Decrease in ranking.
| Poll | Pre Oct 28 | Wk 1 Nov 15 | Wk 2 Nov 22 | Wk 3 Nov 29 | Wk 4 Dec 6 | Wk 5 Dec 13 | Wk 6 Dec 20 | Wk 7 Dec 27 | Wk 8 Jan 3 | Wk 9 Jan 10 | Wk 10 Jan 17 | Wk 11 Jan 24 | Wk 12 Jan 31 | Wk 13 Feb 7 | Wk 14 Feb 14 | Wk 15 Feb 21 | Wk 16 Feb 28 | Wk 17 Mar 7 | Wk 18 Mar 14 | Final Mar 29 |
|---|---|---|---|---|---|---|---|---|---|---|---|---|---|---|---|---|---|---|---|---|
| AP | 9 | 9 | 16 | 18 | NR | NR | 20 | NR | NR | NR | NR | 24 | NR | 17 | 14 | 13 | 14 | 12 | 15 | 15 |
| Coaches | 11 | 10 | 14 | 16 | 24 | 24 | 19 | NR | NR | NR | NR | 23 | 23 | 19 | 15 | 13 | 14 | 12 | 13 | 10 |

== Awards and honors ==
- Chandler Parsons, SEC Player of the Year
- Billy Donovan, SEC Coach of the Year
