= 2012–13 Southeastern Conference men's basketball season =

2012–13 SEC Men's Basketball Season
- League: NCAA Division I
- Sport: Basketball
- Teams: 14
- TV partner(s): CBS, ESPN, FSN

Regular Season
- 2013 SEC Champions: Florida
- Runners-up: Alabama, Kentucky, Ole Miss
- Season MVP: Kentavious Caldwell-Pope, Georgia

Tournament
- Venue: Bridgestone Arena, Nashville, Tennessee
- Champions: Ole Miss
- Runners-up: Florida
- Finals MVP: Marshall Henderson, Ole Miss

Basketball seasons
- ← 2011–12 2013–14 →

2012–13 Southeastern Conference men's basketball standings
	Conf.				Overall
Team	W		L	PCT	W		L	PCT
No. 14 Florida	14	–	4	.778	29	–	8	.784
Ole Miss †	12	–	6	.667	27	–	9	.750
Alabama	12	–	6	.667	23	–	13	.639
Kentucky	12	–	6	.667	21	–	12	.636
Missouri	11	–	7	.611	23	–	11	.676
Tennessee	11	–	7	.611	20	–	13	.606
Arkansas	10	–	8	.556	19	–	13	.594
LSU	9	–	9	.500	19	–	12	.613
Georgia	9	–	9	.500	15	–	17	.469
Vanderbilt	8	–	10	.444	16	–	17	.485
Texas A&M	7	–	11	.389	18	–	15	.545
South Carolina	4	–	14	.222	14	–	18	.438
Mississippi State	4	–	14	.222	10	–	22	.313
Auburn	3	–	15	.167	9	–	23	.281
† 2013 SEC tournament winner As of March 31, 2013; Rankings from AP poll

The 2012–13 Southeastern Conference men's basketball season began with practices in October 2012, followed by the start of the regular season in November. Conference play started in early January 2013, and concluded in March with the 2013 SEC men's basketball tournament at the Bridgestone Arena in Nashville. This was the first season for two former Big 12 teams, as the Texas A&M Aggies and the Missouri Tigers played their first season in the SEC.

== Preseason ==
	Coaches	Media
1.		Kentucky (17)
2.		Florida (3)
3.		Missouri (1)
4.		Tennessee (1)
5.		Arkansas
6.		Alabama
7.		Ole Miss
8.		Georgia
9.		Texas A&M
10.		Vanderbilt
11.		LSU
12.		Auburn
13.		South Carolina
14.		Mississippi State

() first place votes

=== Preseason All-SEC teams ===
Media
Kenny Boynton Florida
Nerlens Noel Kentucky
**Phil Pressey Missouri**
Jarnell Stokes Tennessee
B. J. Young Arkansas

- Coaches select 8 players
- Players in bold are choices for SEC Player of the Year

== Rankings ==
Legend
Increase in ranking
Decrease in ranking
Not ranked previous week

		Pre	Wk 2	Wk 3	Wk 4	Wk 5	Wk 6	Wk 7	Wk 8	Wk 9	Wk 10	Wk 11	Wk 12	Wk 13	Wk 14	Wk 15	Wk 16	Wk 17	Wk 18	Wk 19	Final
Alabama	AP		RV	RV	RV	RV	RV														
Alabama	C			RV	RV	RV															
Arkansas	AP																				
Arkansas	C																				
Auburn	AP																				
Auburn	C																				
Florida	AP	10	10	7	7	6	5	8	14	13	11	10	8	4	2	7	5	8	11	13	14
Florida	C	10	10	8	7	5	5	9	11	9	9	9	7	4	2	6	4	6	9	11	12
Georgia	AP																				
Georgia	C	RV	RV																		
Kentucky	AP	3	3	8	8	RV	RV	RV	RV	RV	RV				RV	25				RV	
Kentucky	C	3	3	7	8	19	22	23	23	RV	RV				RV	RV	RV	RV		RV	
LSU	AP					RV	RV														
LSU	C																				
Mississippi State	AP																				
Mississippi State	C																				
Missouri	AP	15	14	13	16	12	12	12	7	12	10	17	22	17	21	RV	RV	RV	RV		
Missouri	C	17	15	14	15	11	11	12	9	12	12	16	22	18	20	RV	RV			RV	
Ole Miss	AP											RV	23	16	RV	RV					RV
Ole Miss	C				RV	RV	RV					RV	24	16	23	RV					RV
South Carolina	AP																				
South Carolina	C																				
Tennessee	AP	RV	RV	RV	RV																
Tennessee	C	RV	RV	RV	RV																
Texas A&M	AP																				
Texas A&M	C																				
Vanderbilt	AP																				
Vanderbilt	C																				

== Conference Schedules ==
=== Conference matrix ===
This table summarizes the head-to-head results between teams in conference play. (x) indicates games remaining this season.

	Alabama	Arkansas	Auburn	Florida	Georgia	Kentucky	LSU	Mississippi State	Missouri	Ole Miss	South Carolina	Tennessee	Texas A&M	Vanderbilt
vs. Alabama	–	0–1	1–1	1–0	0–2	0–1	1–1	0–2	1–0	1–0	0–1	1–1	0–1	0–1
vs. Arkansas	1–0	–	0–2	1–1	0–1	0–1	1–0	0–1	1–1	1–0	1–0	0–1	1–1	1–1
vs. Auburn	1–1	2–0	–	1–0	1–0	2–0	0–1	1–0	1–0	2–0	0–1	1–0	1–0	2–0
vs. Florida	0–1	1–1	0–1	–	0–2	1–1	0–1	0–2	1–1	0–1	0–1	1–0	0–1	0–1
vs. Georgia	2–0	1–0	0–1	2–0	–	0–1	0–1	1–0	1–0	1–0	0–2	0–2	0–2	1–0
vs. Kentucky	1–0	1–0	0–2	1–1	1–0	–	0–1	0–1	0–1	0–1	0–1	1–1	1–1	0–2
vs. LSU	1–1	0–1	1–0	1–0	1–0	1–0	–	0–2	1–1	1–0	1–1	1–0	0–2	0–1
vs. Mississippi State	2–0	1–0	0–1	2–0	0–1	1–0	2–0	–	1–0	1–1	1–1	1–0	1–0	1–0
vs. Missouri	0–1	1–1	0–1	1–1	0–1	1–0	1–1	0–1	–	1–1	0–2	1–0	1–0	0–1
vs. Ole Miss	0–1	0–1	0–2	1–0	0–1	1–0	0–1	1–1	1–1	–	1–0	0–2	1–1	0–1
vs. South Carolina	1–0	0–1	1–0	1–0	2–0	1–0	1–1	1–1	2–0	0–1	–	1–0	1–0	2–0
vs. Tennessee	1–1	1–0	0–1	0–1	2–0	1–1	0–1	0–1	0–1	2–0	0–1	–	0–1	0–2
vs. Texas A&M	1–0	1–1	0–1	1–0	2–0	1–1	2–0	0–1	0–1	1–1	0–1	1–0	–	1–0
vs. Vanderbilt	1–0	1–1	0–2	1–0	0–1	2–0	1–0	0–1	1–0	1–0	0–2	2–0	0–1	–
Total	12–6	10–8	3–15	14–4	9–9	12–6	9–9	4–14	11–7	12–6	4–14	11–7	7–11	8–10

== Postseason ==
=== SEC tournament ===
- March 13–17, 2013 Southeastern Conference Basketball Tournament, Bridgestone Arena, Nashville, TN.

**2013 SEC men's basketball tournament seeds and results**
Seed	School	Conf.	Over.	Tiebreaker	First Round March 13	Second Round March 14	Quarterfinals March 15	Semifinals March 16	Championship March 17
1.	‡**Florida**	14–4	26–7		BYE	BYE	#9 LSU - **W, 80–58**	#4 Alabama - **W, 61–51**	#3 Ole Miss - **L, 63–66**
2.	†**Kentucky**	12–6	21–11	1–1 vs ALA, MISS; 1–1 vs FLA	BYE	BYE	#10 Vanderbilt - **L, 48–64**		
3.	†**Ole Miss**	12–6	26–8	1–1 vs ALA, KEN; 0–1 vs FLA; 2–0 vs TENN	BYE	BYE	#6 Missouri - **W, 64–62**	#10 Vanderbilt - **W, 64–52**	#1 Florida - **W, 66–63**
4.	†**Alabama**	12–6	21–12	1–1 vs KEN, MISS; 0–1 vs FLA; 1–1 vs TENN	BYE	BYE	#5 Tennessee - **W, 58–48**	#1 Florida - **L, 51–61**	
5.	#**Tennessee**	11–7	20–12	1–0 vs MIZZ	BYE	#13 Mississippi State - **W, 69–53**	#4 Alabama - **L, 48–58**		
6.	#**Missouri**	11–7	23–10	0–1 vs TENN	BYE	#11 Texas A&M - **W, 62–50**	#3 Ole Miss - **L, 62–64**		
7.	#**Arkansas**	10–8	19–13		BYE	#10 Vanderbilt - **L, 72–75**			
8.	#**Georgia**	9–9	15–17	1–0 vs LSU	BYE	#9 LSU - **L, 63–68**			
9.	#**LSU**	9–9	19–12	0–1 vs UGA	BYE	#8 Georgia - **W, 68–63**	#1 Florida - **L, 58–80**		
10.	#**Vanderbilt**	8–10	16–17		BYE	#7 Arkansas - **W, 75–72**	#2 Kentucky - **W, 64–48**	#3 Ole Miss - **L, 52–64**	
11.	**Texas A&M**	7–11	18–15		#14 Auburn - **W, 71–62**	#6 Missouri - **L, 50–62**			
12.	**South Carolina**	4–14	14–18	1–1 vs MSST; 1–0 vs MISS	#13 Mississippi State - **L, 59–70**				
13.	**Mississippi State**	4–14	10–22	1–1 vs SCAR; 1–1 vs MISS	#12 South Carolina - **W, 70–59**	#5 Tennessee - **L, 53–69**			
14.	**Auburn**	3–15	9–23		#11 Texas A&M - **L, 62–71**				
‡ – SEC regular season champions, and tournament No. 1 seed. † – Received a double-bye in the conference tournament. # – Received a single-bye in the conference tournament. Overall records include all games played in the SEC tournament.

=== NCAA tournament ===
Seed	Region	School	Second Round	Third Round	Sweet 16	Elite Eight	Final Four	Championship
3	South	**Florida**	#14 Northwestern State - **Mar. 22, Austin** - **W, 79–47**	#11 Minnesota - **Mar. 24, Austin** - **W, 78–64**	#15 Florida Gulf Coast - **Mar. 29, Arlington** - **W, 62–50**	#4 Michigan - **Mar. 31, Arlington** - **WL, 59–79**		
9	Midwest	**Missouri**	#8 Colorado State - **Mar. 21, Lexington** - **L, 72–84**					
12	West	**Ole Miss**	#5 Wisconsin - **Mar. 22, Kansas City** - **W, 57–46**	#13 La Salle - **Mar. 24, Kansas City** - **L, 74–76**				
	**3 Bids**	W-L (%):	2–1 .667	1–1 .500	1–0 1.000	0–1 .000	0–0 –	TOTAL: 4–3 .571

=== National Invitation tournament ===
Seed	Bracket	School	First Round	Second Round	Quarterfinals	Semifinals	Finals
1	Kentucky	**Kentucky**	#8 Robert Morris - **Mar. 19, Moon Township** - **L, 57–59**				
1	Alabama	**Alabama**	#8 Northeastern - **Mar. 19, Tuscaloosa** - **W, 62–43**	#4 Stanford - **Mar. 23, Tuscaloosa** - **W, 66–54**	#2 Maryland - **Mar. 26, Tuscaloosa** - **L, 57–58**		
2	Southern Miss	**Tennessee**	#7 Mercer - **Mar. 20, Knoxville** - **L, 67–75**				
	**3 Bids**	W-L (%):	1–2 .333	1–0 1.000	0–1 .000	0–0 –	TOTAL: 2–3 .400

=== NBA draft ===
The following 1st & 2nd team All-SEC performers were listed as seniors: Erik Murphy, Elston Turner, Laurence Bowers, Kenny Boynton, Murphy Holloway, Mike Rosario. The deadline for entering the NBA draft is April 29, but once one has declared, the deadline for withdrawing the declaration and retaining NCAA eligibility is April 10. The deadline for submitting information to the NBA Advisory Committee for a 72-hour response is April 3.

The following SEC underclassmen have sought the advice of the NBA's undergraduate advisory committee to determine his draft prospects:
The following SEC underclassmen declared early for the 2011 draft: Kentavious Caldwell-Pope, Archie Goodwin, Nerlens Noel, Marshawn Powell, Phil Pressey, B. J. Young

Round	Pick	Player	Position	Nationality	Team	School/club team
1	6	Nerlens Noel	C	United States	New Orleans Pelicans (traded to Philadelphia) (Note: The New Orleans Pelicans traded 6th pick Nerlens Noel and a 2014 protected first-round pick to the Philadelphia 76ers in exchange for Jrue Holiday and 42nd pick Pierre Jackson.)	Kentucky (Fr.)
1	8	Kentavious Caldwell-Pope	SG	United States	Detroit Pistons	Georgia (So.)
1	29	Archie Goodwin	SG	United States	Oklahoma City Thunder (traded to Phoenix via Golden State) (Note: The Golden State Warriors traded 29th pick Archie Goodwin and Malcolm Lee to the Phoenix Suns in exchange for 30th pick Nemanja Nedovic.)	Kentucky (Fr.)
2	49	Erik Murphy	PF	United States/ Finland	Chicago Bulls	Florida (Sr.)
2	57	Alex Oriakhi#	C	United States	Phoenix Suns (from Denver via LA Lakers)	Missouri (Sr.)

== Honors and awards ==
=== All-SEC awards and teams ===
==== Coaches ====
**2013 SEC Men's Basketball Individual Awards**
Award	Recipient(s)
Player of the Year	**Kentavious Caldwell-Pope**, G., GEORGIA
Coach of the Year	**Billy Donovan**, FLORIDA
Defensive Player of the Year	**Nerlens Noel**, C., KENTUCKY
Freshman of the Year	**Nerlens Noel**, C., KENTUCKY
Scholar-Athlete of the Year	**Patric Young**, F., FLORIDA
Sixth Man Award	**Kyle Wiltjer**, F., KENTUCKY

**2013 SEC Men's Basketball All-Conference Teams**
First Team	Second Team	All-Freshman Team	All-Defensive Team
Kentavious Caldwell-Pope So., G., GEORGIA; Erik Murphy Sr., F., FLORIDA; Jordan McRae Jr., G., TENNESSEE; Nerlens Noel Fr., C., KENTUCKY; Johnny O'Bryant III Sr., F., LSU; Phil Pressey Jr., G., MISSOURI; Trevor Releford Jr., G., ALABAMA; Elston Turner Sr., G., TEXAS A&M	Laurence Bowers Sr., F., MISSOURI; Kenny Boynton Sr., G., FLORIDA; Marshall Henderson Jr., G., OLE MISS; Murphy Holloway Sr., F., OLE MISS; Marshawn Powell Jr., F., ARKANSAS; Mike Rosario Sr., G., FLORIDA; Jarnell Stokes So., F., TENNESSEE; B. J. Young So., G., ARKANSAS; Patric Young Jr., F., FLORIDA	Michael Carrera Fr., F., SOUTH CAROLINA; Willie Cauley-Stein Fr., C., KENTUCKY; Michael Frazier Fr., G., FLORIDA; Archie Goodwin Fr., G., KENTUCKY; Charles Mann Fr., F., GEORGIA; Nerlens Noel Fr., C., KENTUCKY; Alex Poythress Fr., F., KENTUCKY; Craig Sword Fr., G., MISS STATE; Gavin Ware Fr., F., MISS STATE	Reginald Buckner Sr., F., OLE MISS; Anthony Hickey So., G., LSU; Nerlens Noel Fr., C., KENTUCKY; Trevor Releford Jr., G., ALABAMA; Scottie Wilbekin Jr., G., FLORIDA; Patric Young Jr., F., FLORIDA
† - denotes unanimous selection

==== Associated Press ====
**2013 SEC Men's Basketball Individual Awards**
Award	Recipient(s)
Player of the Year	**Kentavious Caldwell-Pope**, G, GEORGIA
Coach of the Year	**Billy Donovan**, FLORIDA
Newcomer of the Year	**Marshall Henderson**, G, OLE MISS

**2013 SEC Men's Basketball All-Conference Teams**
First Team	Second Team
Kentavious Caldwell-Pope, So., G, GEORGIA; Erik Murphy, Sr., F/C, FLORIDA; Trevor Releford, Jr., G, ALABAMA; Jordan McRae, Jr., G, TENNESSEE; Nerlens Noel, Fr., F, KENTUCKY	Marshall Henderson, Jr., G, OLE MISS; Elston Turner, Sr., G, TEXAS A&M; Jarnell Stokes, So., F, TENNESSEE; Johnny O'Bryant III, Sr., F, LSU; Murphy Holloway, Sr., F, OLE MISS; Phil Pressey, Jr., G, MISSOURI
† - denotes unanimous selection
