= Mike Rosario =

Puerto Rican basketball player

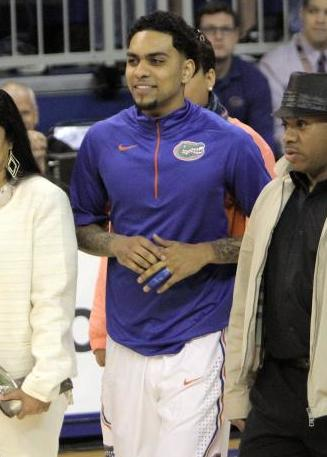

Free agent
- Position: Point guard / shooting guard

Personal information
- Born: November 2, 1990 (age 36) Jersey City, New Jersey, U.S.
- Listed height: 6 ft 3 in (1.91 m)
- Listed weight: 190 lb (86 kg)

Career information
- High school: St. Anthony (Jersey City, New Jersey)
- College: Rutgers (2008–2010); Florida (2011–2013)
- NBA draft: 2013: undrafted
- Playing career: 2013–present

Career history
- 2013–2015: Leones de Ponce
- 2014: Wilki Morskie Szczecin
- 2015–2016: Halcones Rojos Veracruz
- 2016: Cangrejeros de Santurce
- 2017–2018: Hapoel Eilat
- 2018–2021: Piratas de Quebradillas
- 2022–2025: Leones de Ponce

Career highlights
- 3× BSN champion (2014, 2015, 2017); BSN Sixth Man of the Year (2016); Second-team All-SEC (2013); McDonald's All-American (2008); Second-team Parade All-American (2008)

Michael Rosario (born November 2, 1990) is a Puerto Rican professional basketball player who most recently played for Leones de Ponce of the Baloncesto Superior Nacional (BSN). He played college basketball for Rutgers and Florida. On international duty, he represented Puerto Rico in the 2012 Olympic qualifying tournament and FIBA Under-19 World Championship.

== High school career ==
Rosario attended St. Anthony High School and was coached by the legendary Bob Hurley. He spent four years with the Friars and helped maintain their position as a nationally recognized basketball powerhouse. In his senior season, St. Anthony came inches from a rare state tournament loss, a matter that was featured in the 2010 documentary, The Street Stops Here. He averaged nearly 19.0 points and 4.0 rebounds in this final year, and propelled the team to a 32–0 record along with the country's No. 1 ranking according to the USA Today Super 25 and ESPN High Elite 25 polls. The Friars eventually won the state championship upon Hurley's comments on the year, "If you don't win a state championship, you will never be remembered."

Following his years with St. Anthony, he took part in the 2008 McDonald's All-American Boys Game with several other future stars, including Tyreke Evans, Kemba Walker, and Al-Farouq Aminu. It made him only the sixth player from his high school to compete in the reputable game. At its conclusion, Rosario scored eighteen points and recorded five steals in 19 minutes on the court.

On April 6, 2007, Rosario committed to play for the Rutgers Scarlet Knights men's basketball team in college, being coached by Fred Hill. Some of his other possible destinations included Georgetown, Penn State, Seton Hall, St. John's, and St. Joseph's. He was rated a four-star recruit by Rivals.com and 247Sports.com.

== Collegiate career ==
=== Freshman ===
During the summer prior to Rosario's matriculation with Rutgers University, future head coach Fred Hill made the comment, "This honor is further confirmation that Mike Rosario is one of the nation's premier players.” He also said, "Our mission at Rutgers is to build a National Championship-caliber program and Mike is the type of individual who helps further this process."

Rosario debuted for Rutgers on November 14, 2008, with 17 points, 4 rebounds, 2 steals, and 1 assist against Marist. His performance helped him be the first freshman Scarlet Knight to score 17 or more points in the team's season opener since Mike Jones in 1993. On November 21, 2008, Rosario recorded a season-high 27 points against the Robert Morris Colonials after being given 35 minutes of playing time. Despite his electric scoring display, he finished with just 1 rebound and 0 assists. He had his first 7-rebound game on November 26, 2008, against Lehigh. This would meet his season-high. Rosario would manage to do the same against Bryant on December 20, 2008. He played his first game as the starting small forward on December 3, 2008, against Rider, scoring 25 points total. On March 7, 2009, vs the South Florida Bulls, Rosario scored zero points for the first time in his college career on 0-of-5 shooting from the field. He played his sole postseason game in the Big East tournament first round, against Notre Dame, finishing with 12 points, 4 rebounds, and 2 assists. At the end of the season, Rosario set the Rutgers freshman scoring record with 517 points. He led all Big East players with his amount of college experience scoring-wise as well. Rosario also ranked 5th in points among all freshman playing basketball in NCAA Division I. His forceful season brought his name to the conference's All-Rookie Team for the 2008–2009 season along with Yancy Gates, Kemba Walker, Greg Monroe, Samardo Samuels, and Devin Ebanks. Rutgers finished the year with an 11–21 record, 2–16 in their conference play. Apart from his Big East honors, Rosario was named Metropolitan Basketball Writers Association Rookie of the Year and a CollegeInsider.com Freshmen All-American.

=== Sophomore ===
After averaging over 16 points in his first season in college, Rosario made the decision to return to Rutgers for his sophomore year. He was listed as one of the possible factors in the rebuilding of the Big East Conference along with Greg Monroe, Yancy Gates, and many other members of the 2008-09 All-Rookie Team.

Rosario made his first appearance as a sophomore on November 14, 2009, against Marist, recording 17 points, 4 rebounds, 4 assists, and 1 steal. He also saw 35 minutes of action. He finally broke the 20 point barrier against Vermont on November 22, 2009. This was his second Legends Classic appearance, the first one in which he scored 13 points against the Drexel Dragons at the Louis Brown Athletic Center (RAC). Due to his strong performance through the tournament, Rosario was named to the All-Tournament Team with Anthony Gurley, Erving Walker, Vernon Macklin, and Kalin Lucas. On December 22, 2009, he broke his personal scoring record against Saint Peter's with 28 points total. Rosario also added four rebounds and five assists, shooting 10-of-16 on field goals. He, again, scored a career-high 33 points against St. John's, recording 5 rebounds and steals as well. This performance helped him make his first appearance above the 30-point barrier with Rutgers. Rosario made his second postseason display on March 9, 2010, against Cincinnati, with 26 points, 3 rebounds, and 0 assists. The team, however, finished the season 15-17 and 5–13 in conference play. Seeing to the fact that the team was not winning at a reasonable rate, Rosario decided to transfer to Florida for his junior year. He said, "The biggest thing that Florida offered me was, 'We're going to win'… that's something I've missed doing." Nevertheless, Rosario became the second sophomore in Rutgers' history to join the 1,000 point club. Throughout the season, he was named to the Big East Conference Honor Roll on two occasions.

=== Junior ===
Rosario was forced to redshirt his third season with Florida because of NCAA transfer rules. He said, "Oh, man, I wanted to grab a uniform so bad sometimes." However, since the preseason, Rosario endured a disc problem in his lower back that caused numbness in the area, but did not require surgery according to Billy Donovan. As Florida's 2010-11 season came to a close, Rosario, with Erving Walker, became one of just two players on the roster to enter their fourth year.

He debuted with Florida on November 11, 2011, tallying for 19 points, 2 rebounds, 2 assists, and 2 steals against Jackson State. This would also become his season-high total due to his lack of influence on the strong basketball team. Rosario posted seven rebounds against Wright State on November 21, 2011, making for a season's high. On December 29, Florida faced off against his former team, Rutgers, losing 85–83. Through the season, he did not start in a single game, generally coming off the bench for Bradley Beal, Erving Walker, and Kenny Boynton. In the SEC men's basketball tournament, Rosario averaged just 1.0 points, 0.5 rebounds, and 6.0 minutes per game. He also most notably scored 12 points in his NCAA tournament appearance against Norfolk State.

=== Senior ===
Rosario made his first display as a senior after being given a start against Alabama State on November 11, 2012, with 14 points, 2 rebounds, 2 assists, and 3 steals. Due to the departures of several players from the previous season's roster, including Bradley Beal, Rosario started in all of his games. On December 19, 2012, against Southeastern Louisiana, he posted 20 points, 6 rebounds, and 4 assists, his career-high on Florida. He, again, broke his personal record with his new team on February 16, 2013, against Auburn, with 22 points. On March 24, 2013, against Minnesota, he recorded a season-high 25 points. By the end of the season, Rosario garnered All-SEC Second Team honors and was named to the South Regional all-tournament team with Mitch McGary, Ben McLemore, and Nik Stauskas.

== Professional career ==
In January 2013, Rosario was selected by Leones de Ponce, one of the most successful franchises in Baloncesto Superior Nacional. He was the third overall pick in the entire draft.

Rosario made his professional debut with Leones de Ponce on May 17, 2013, against Mets de Guaynabo, with 11 points and 4 rebounds as the starting shooting guard. He played off the bench in the majority of his rookie season in Puerto Rico, but posted a career-high 19 points vs Vaqueros de Bayamón on June 13, 2013.

After concluding his first season in the BSN, Rosario was not selected throughout the 2013 NBA draft. It was widely believed that they were ignored due to "lack of size." This forced him to continue his international career with Leones de Ponce.

Prior to the 2014 BSN season, Rosario took part in three games of the FIBA Americas League. Through the competition, he averaged 11.7 points, 3.7 rebounds, and 1.7 assists.

On November 7, 2014, he signed with Polish team Wilki Morskie Szczecin.

On October 6, 2017, he signed with the Israeli team Hapoel Eilat for the 2017–18 season. However, on January 11, 2018, he parted ways with Hapoel Eilat due to injury. Rosario played 10 games for Eilat and averaged 13 points, 1.6 rebounds and 1.7 assists per game.
