= Orange Bowl Basketball Classic =

Annual collegiate basketball event

- Formerly: HIP Health Plan Orange Bowl Basketball Classic; Metro PCS Orange Bowl Classic
- Sport: College basketball
- Founded: 1994, 32 years ago
- Country: United States
- Venue: Amerant Arena
- Sponsor: AutoNation

The Orange Bowl Basketball Classic also known as the AutoNation Orange Bowl Basketball Classic and AutoNation Orange Bowl Classic is an annual men's college basketball event played in December. The annual neutral site games are held at Amerant Arena in Sunrise, Florida.

Through its history, the event has commonly featured Florida-based programs such as the Florida State Seminoles, Florida Gators, UCF Knights, Miami Hurricanes and USF Bulls. In 2025, the 31st annual Orange Bowl Basketball Classic was held.

== History ==
=== 1994 ===
UNLV defeated Miami, 56–55.

=== 1995 ===
Tennessee defeated Miami, 57–55.

=== 1996 ===
On December 28, 1996, Miami defeated DePaul, 61–45.

=== 1997 ===
UAB defeated Florida 80–73 on December 27, 1997, at Miami Arena in Miami, Florida. Georgia Tech defeated Miami (FL), 69–61.

=== 1998 ===
On December 27, 1998, Florida defeated Michigan 79–63 in the first game at the Orange Bowl Basketball Classic. In the second game, Miami (FL) defeated Ohio State 72-64.

=== 1999 ===
No. 7 North Carolina defeated Miami (FL) 78–68 in the 1999 Orange Bowl Classic, Jason Capel had 20 points and 11 rebounds for the Tar Heels. UMass defeated Florida State 69-60 in the 1999 Orange Bowl Classic.

=== 2000 ===
In the 2000 Orange Bowl Classic, Florida defeated Gonzaga 85–71, led by 27 points and 10 rebounds from Udonis Haslem. The game was a rematch from the 1999 NCAA Division I men's basketball tournament, where Gonzaga eliminated Florida 73–72. In the first game of the double header, Nebraska defeated Miami 72-64.

=== 2001 ===
Florida defeated Charlotte 73–52 at the 2001 Orange Bowl Classic. Miami (FL) defeated Indiana 58–53 in the first game of the double-header.

=== 2002 ===
On December 21, 2002, Florida defeated Miami (FL) 94–93 in double overtime.

=== 2003 ===
Florida defeated West Virginia 70–57 at the 2003 Orange Bowl Basketball Classic. Miami (FL) defeated Temple 72–66.

=== 2004 ===
Xavier defeated Miami (FL) in overtime 83–70. Florida defeated Providence 84–66.

=== 2005 ===
Louisville defeated Miami 58–43 at the Orange Bowl Basketball Classic in Sunrise, Florida. The Cardinals' leading scorer was Juan Palacios with 19 points. Florida State defeated Nebraska 74–60, Isaiah Swann was the Seminoles’ leading scorer.

=== 2006 ===
Nebraska defeated Miami (FL) 82–67 at the 2006 Orange Bowl Classic in Sunrise, Florida. The Cornhuskers' Marcus Perry was Nebraska's leading scorer with 25 points. Florida defeated UAB 75–70, Corey Brewer led the Gators with 19 points.

=== 2007 ===
Florida defeated Temple 86–69 at the 2007 MetroPCS Orange Bowl Classic, Marreese Speights led the Gators with 20 points. Winthrop defeated Miami (FL) 76–70, Chris Gaynor led the Eagles with 21 points.

=== 2008 ===
Florida defeated Winthrop 74–45, the Gators' leading scorer was Chandler Parsons with 17 points. Florida State defeated Western Kentucky 82–69, Toney Douglas scored 27 points to lead FSU.

=== 2009 ===
Richmond defeated Florida at the MetroPCS Orange Bowl Classic in 2009, led by 16 points by David Gonzalvez. Miami (FL) defeated Florida Atlantic 87–69, Miami's Dwayne Collins was the Hurricanes leading scorer with 17 points.

=== 2010 ===
Florida defeated Kansas State 57–44 behind 15 points from Kenny Boynton. UCF improved to 10–0 with a 84–78 win over Miami (FL), led by 23 points from Marcus Jordan.

=== 2011 ===
Miami (FL) defeated Florida Atlantic 93–90 in 2OT. Florida defeated Texas A&M 84–64.

=== 2012 ===
Florida State defeated Tulsa 82–63. Florida defeated Air Force 78–61.

=== 2013 ===
Florida State handed No. 22 UMass their first loss of the 2013 season 60–55 at the Orange Bowl Classic. Florida beat Fresno State 66–49.

=== 2014 ===
Florida State beat South Florida 75–62. Florida beat Wake Forest 63–50.

=== 2015 ===
Florida State rallied past Florida Atlantic 64–59. Florida beat Oklahoma State 72–70.

=== 2016 ===
Florida State defeated Manhattan 83–67. Florida defeated Charlotte 87–46.

=== 2017 ===
Oklahoma State defeated Florida State 71–70. Clemson defeated Florida 71–69.

=== 2018 ===
No. 11 Florida State defeated Saint Louis 81–59. Florida defeated FGCU 77–56.

=== 2019 ===
In the 2019 Orange Bowl Classic, Florida State defeated South Florida 66–60. Utah State defeated Florida 65–62.

=== 2020 ===
The 2020 Orange Bowl Classic was cancelled due to the COVID-19 pandemic.

=== 2021 ===
On May 20, 2021, Florida State vs. UCF and USF vs. Florida were announced as the matchups for the 27th annual Orange Bowl Classic. The Florida State vs. UCF game was cancelled while Florida defeated USF 66–55 on Dec. 18, 2021.

=== 2022 ===
On December 17, 2022, St. John's defeated Florida State 93–79 at the Orange Bowl Classic. Missouri defeated UCF 68-66 off a DeAndre Gholston buzzer-beating 3 pointer.

=== 2023 ===
On December 9, 2023, USF defeated Florida State 88–72. Florida defeated Richmond 88–72.

=== 2024 ===
Florida State defeated Tulane 77–64 on December 14, 2024, in the Orange Bowl Classic. UCF defeated Tulsa 88–75.

=== 2025 ===
The 2025 Orange Bowl Basketball Classic on December 13, 2025 featured a doubleheader with Florida State vs. UMass and Florida vs. George Washington.

UMass defeated Florida State 103–95. Florida defeated George Washington 80–70.
