= Andrew Owens =

American lawyer

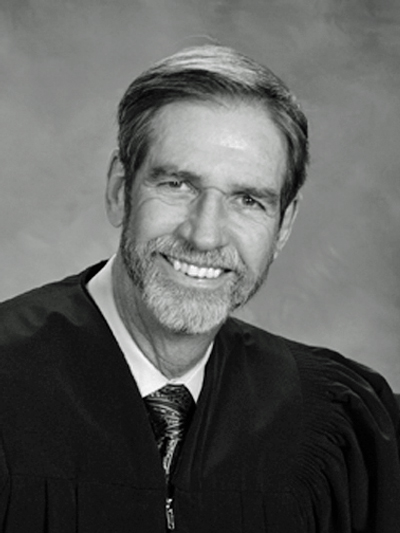

Judge of the Twelfth Judicial Circuit of Florida
- In office March 1983 – March 22, 2017
- Appointed by: Bob Graham
- Succeeded by: Andrea W. McHugh

Chief Judge of the Twelfth Judicial Circuit of Florida
- In office 2011–2015

Personal details
- Born: Andrew Douglas Owens, Jr. March 21, 1947 (age 79) Atlanta, Georgia
- Education: B.S., University of Florida, 1970; J.D., University of Florida, 1973

Andrew Douglas Owens Jr. (born March 21, 1947) is an American attorney, former state court judge, and former college basketball star.

== Family ==
Andrew is the son of Andrew Sr. and Doris E. Purcell. His mother's father was Sanford P. Purcell, a Georgia State Senator and member of the Democratic Party.

== Early life ==
Owens was born in Atlanta, Georgia, but moved to Tampa, Florida as a child with his family, where his father became the owner of an auto parts store. His mother, who had played basketball at Agnes Scott College in Decatur, Georgia, taught him how to play the sport. Owens attended Hillsborough High School in Tampa, where he became a standout basketball player for the Hillsborough Terriers high school basketball team. He played in seventy-seven prep games, while scoring 1,806 points and averaging 23.5 points per game. As a senior, he scored 397 points in sixteen Western Conference games, averaging 24.8 per game, including 51 points against rival King High School. He was named as a high school All-American along with Lew Alcindor and Pete Maravich.

== College career ==
Owens received athletic scholarship offers to attend the University of Kentucky and the University of North Carolina, but he accepted a scholarship to attend his home-state University of Florida in Gainesville, Florida. As a Florida undergraduate, he played forward for coach Tommy Bartlett's Florida Gators men's basketball team for three seasons from 1967 to 1970, and was team captain for the 1969–70 season. In 1968–69, he played with Neal Walk and helped lead the Gators to their first postseason tournament. During the 1969–70 season, he scored 677 points and averaged twenty-seven points a game for the season—still the current record for the Gators men's basketball team. During his three-season college career, he scored a total of 1,445 points and compiled eleven games in which he scored thirty or more points. He was an All-Southeastern Conference (SEC) selection in 1968 and 1970, and an Academic All-American in 1970, and received an NCAA post-graduate scholarship.

The Seattle SuperSonics selected Owens in the eleventh round of the 1970 NBA draft, and the New Orleans Buccaneers picked him in the twelfth round of the 1970 ABA Draft. Instead of playing professional basketball, he decided to attend law school.

Owens graduated from the University of Florida with a bachelor's degree in finance in 1970 and a J.D. degree in 1973, and was inducted into the University of Florida Athletic Hall of Fame as a "Gator Great" in 1978. He was honored as an "SEC Basketball Legend" at halftime of the Florida–Vanderbilt game in 2001.

== Law career ==
Owens worked as an attorney in Punta Gorda, Florida after graduating from law school. Florida Governor Bob Graham appointed him to a newly created judgeship on the Twelfth Judicial Circuit in 1982, and he later presided over the Carlie Bruscia murder trial. He was one of the driving forces behind the creation of a Mental Health Court in Sarasota, as well as the Court Intervention Program also known as "Drug Court," a year-long out-patient program for felony drug offenders. He served as the chief judge of the Twelfth Judicial Circuit from 2011 to 2015. He resigned from the court on March 22, 2017.

== See also ==
- Florida Gators
- List of Levin College of Law graduates
- List of University of Florida alumni
- List of University of Florida Athletic Hall of Fame members
