= Carlie's Law =

Failed bill to protect children

- Long title: To amend title 18, United States Code, and other laws to protect children from criminal recidivists, and for other purposes.
- Announced in: the 108th United States Congress

Legislative history
- Introduced in the House as H.R. 4150 by Katherine Harris R‑FL 13th on April 2, 2004; Committee consideration by Committee on the Judiciary, Committee on Transportation and Infrastructure

Carlie's Law was a bill introduced in the United States Congress by Representative Katherine Harris (R-FL), with the support of Nick Lampson (D-TX) and Marsha Blackburn (R-TN), in response to the kidnapping, rape, and murder of 11-year-old Carlie Brucia by Joseph P. Smith in Florida in February 2004. Smith was on probation at the time of Brucia's murder, having been released from state prison thirteen months prior.

The amendment to existing law was intended to toughen parole rules for sex offenders and also notify non-custodial parents when there is criminal activity near their child's home. Partly for this reason, Joseph Brucia, the child's father, approved making the law in her name, although he concedes this law would not have applied to her specific case, since the charges for which Smith was on probation were not the sexual offenses the law would target.

The bill failed to pass before the end of the 2004 session. Harris committed to reintroduce the bill in 2005, but no further information has been made available.

== Background ==
Carlie Jane Brucia

Carlie Jane Brucia (March 16, 1992 – February 1, 2004) was sexually battered and murdered by Joseph P. Smith (March 17, 1966 – July 26, 2021) after being kidnapped from a car wash near her home in Sarasota, Florida, United States, on February 1, 2004, while returning from a friend's house. She was reported missing by her parents within half an hour of her abduction.

The kidnapping case became infamous after a surveillance video showing the girl surfaced. The video, taken from a security camera located behind a car wash, shows Brucia being confronted by a man, later identified as Smith, who then grabbed her arm and led her away toward a car that was spotted on another camera. The video was shown nationwide and spurred a massive manhunt for the abductor.

== Arrest ==
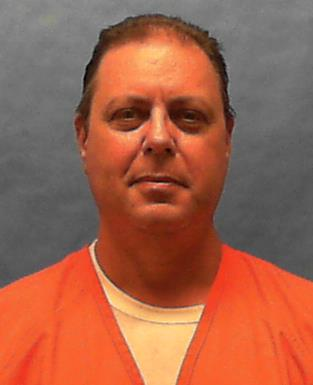
Joseph P. Smith

On February 6, police announced that Smith, a 37-year-old father of three and car mechanic with a long list of arrests for drug-related charges and one for kidnapping and false imprisonment, was in custody as the primary suspect. In the same announcement, the police confirmed that Smith's car was involved in the crime.

The story gained national media attention in large part because Brucia's abduction was recorded by a surveillance camera. The tape shows her being approached by a man who seemed to be in his late 20s or early 30s. They apparently had a short conversation, after which he grabbed her by the arm and took her away. The FBI and NASA joined in the efforts to find Brucia and the man seen with her on the videotape. NASA researchers used advanced image processing technology to enhance the recording by reducing image jitter.

At least two informants called police, having recognized Smith from the television broadcasts of the security camera tape. Smith was already in custody at the time, having been arrested on February 3 on an unrelated parole violation. Smith refused to speak with investigators about Brucia's abduction until February 5, when he revealed where he had hidden her body, behind a nearby church.

== Trial ==
On February 20, Smith was indicted for first-degree murder, and charges of kidnapping and capital sexual battery were also filed by Sarasota County prosecutors. The trial started November 7, 2005 in Sarasota. On November 17, 2005, the jury returned a guilty verdict. On December 1, 2005, the jury, by a vote of 10 to 2, returned a recommendation for the death penalty. On March 15, 2006, Smith was sentenced to two terms of life imprisonment on the charges of capital sexual battery and kidnapping, and to death by lethal injection on the murder charge.

In October 2011, the United States Supreme Court (which had earlier rejected an appeal from Smith in June 2011), ordered that the State of Florida respond to a federal claim filed by Smith saying his right to confront witnesses at trial was violated when prosecutors introduced DNA evidence against him without making available the laboratory technician who actually performed the work. The Court later dismissed the appeal after deciding a related case, Williams v. Illinois.

In the aftermath of Hurst v. Florida, which required juries in Florida to be unanimous in imposing the death penalty, Smith's death sentence was overturned in 2018; however, the Florida Supreme Court reinstated his death sentence in April 2020.

Smith, aged 55, was found dead in prison on July 26, 2021, at Union Correctional Institution in Raiford, while awaiting his execution. His cause of death was liver cancer.

== Dramatization ==
The case was featured in the first episode "Come Home Carlie" of the seventh season of Investigation Discovery's See No Evil, aired in early February 2021.

== See also ==
- Child murder
- Jessica's Law
