= Chandler Parsons =

American basketball player (born 1988)

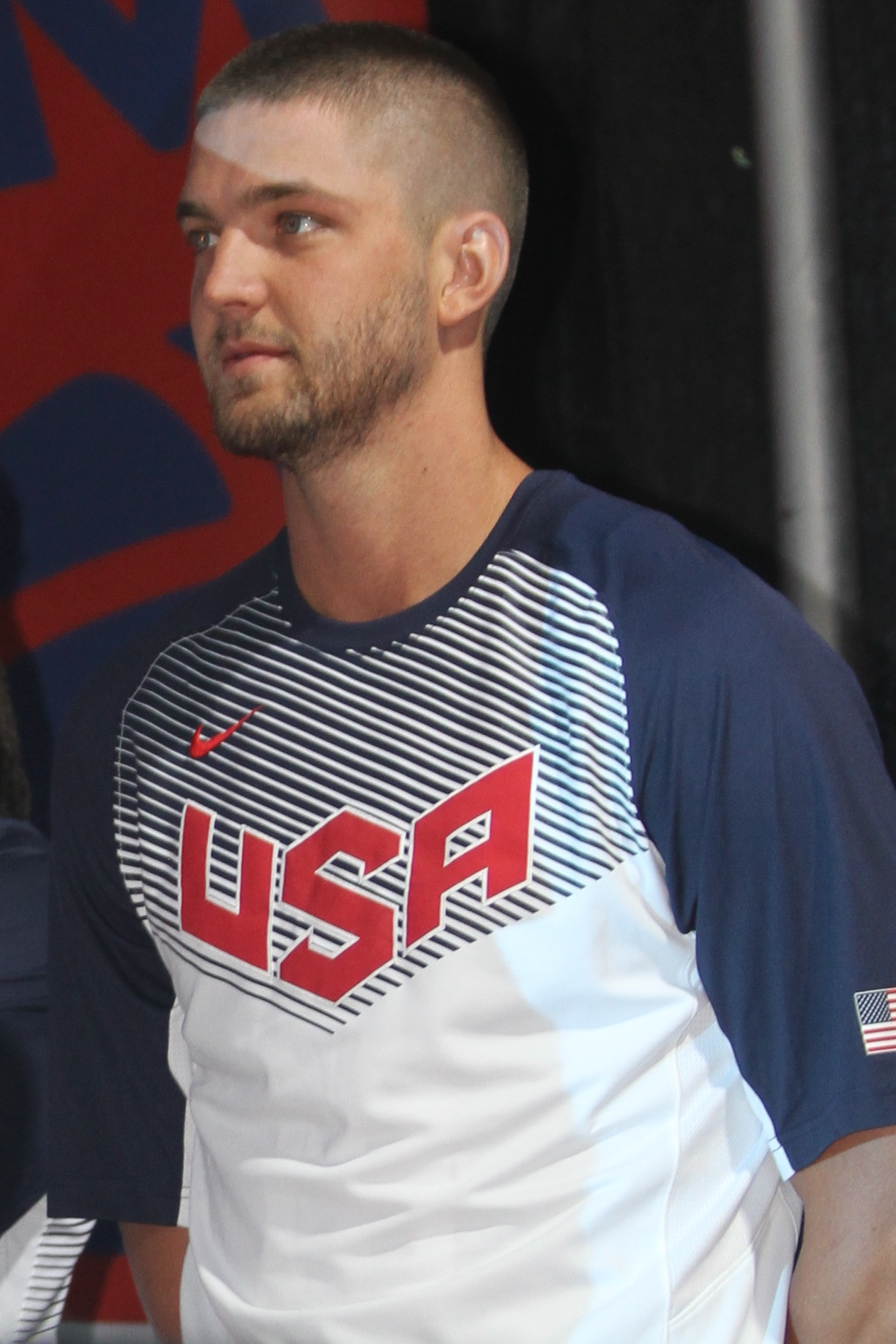
- Parsons in August 2014

Personal information
- Born: October 25, 1988 (age 38) Casselberry, Florida, U.S.
- Listed height: 6 ft 9 in (2.06 m)
- Listed weight: 230 lb (104 kg)

Career information
- High school: Lake Howell (Winter Park, Florida)
- College: Florida (2007–2011)
- NBA draft: 2011: 2nd round, 38th overall pick
- Drafted by: Houston Rockets
- Playing career: 2011–2020
- Position: Small forward
- Number: 25, 31

Career history
- 2011: Cholet
- 2011–2014: Houston Rockets
- 2014–2016: Dallas Mavericks
- 2016–2019: Memphis Grizzlies
- 2019–2020: Atlanta Hawks

Career highlights
- NBA All-Rookie Second Team (2012); AP honorable mention All-American (2011); SEC Player of the Year (2011); First-team All-SEC (2011)

Career statistics
- Points: 5,571 (12.7 ppg)
- Rebounds: 1,972 (4.5 rpg)
- Assists: 1,201 (2.7 apg)
- Stats at NBA.com
- Stats at Basketball Reference

Chandler Evan Parsons (born October 25, 1988) is an American former professional basketball player. He played college basketball for the Florida Gators and was drafted by the Houston Rockets with the 38th overall pick in the 2011 NBA draft. Between 2011 and 2020, Parsons played in the NBA for the Rockets, Dallas Mavericks, Memphis Grizzlies, and Atlanta Hawks before injuries caused by a drunk driver forced him into retirement. Post-retirement, he became a sports commentator, including currently as the co-host of FanDuel online show Run It Back.

== Early life ==
Parsons was born in Casselberry, Florida, and attended Lake Howell High School alongside future fellow Florida Gator Nick Calathes. Together, Parsons and Calathes helped the Lake Howell Silverhawks high school basketball team advance to the Florida Class 5A state basketball championship final four in 2005, 2006 and 2007, winning the state championship in 2007. As a senior, Parsons was a first-team all-state selection, and was recognized as the most valuable player of the state championship game after scoring thirty points and grabbing ten rebounds.

== College career ==
Parsons accepted an athletic scholarship to attend the University of Florida in Gainesville, Florida, where he played for coach Billy Donovan's Florida Gators men's basketball team from 2007 to 2011. Parsons commented that playing for four years under Donovan gave him an advantage over other players who left the team early.

During his freshman season, Parsons played in 36 games averaging 8.1 points per game and 4.0 rebounds per game, but the Gators failed to make the NCAA Tournament. During the 2008–09 season, Parsons saw more playing time and his scoring, rebounding, and assists all improved. The Gators once again failed to make the NCAA tournament, though.

In his junior season, Parsons averaged 12.4 points, 6.9 rebounds, and 2.6 assists per game. On January 3, 2010, Parsons hit a 75-foot shot with no time left in overtime to give the Gators a one-point victory over North Carolina State. The Gators were invited to the NCAA Tournament, but lost to BYU in the first round.

During the 2010–11 season, Parsons averaged 11.3 points and 7.8 rebounds in 34.1 minutes per game while leading the Gators to the best regular-season record in the SEC. On January 23, 2011, the Gators trailed South Carolina by one when Parsons hit a three-point shot to give the Gators the win. On March 8, 2011, he was named the 2011 SEC Player of the Year, becoming the first Florida Gator to win that honor.

The Gators also made the NCAA Tournament for the second year in a row. In the first three rounds of the tournament, the Gators beat UC Santa Barbara, UCLA, and BYU. In the Elite Eight, the Gators lost to Butler. Parsons was picked to the All-America fifth team by Fox Sports. Parsons graduated from Florida with a degree in telecommunications.

== Professional career ==
=== Cholet (2011) ===
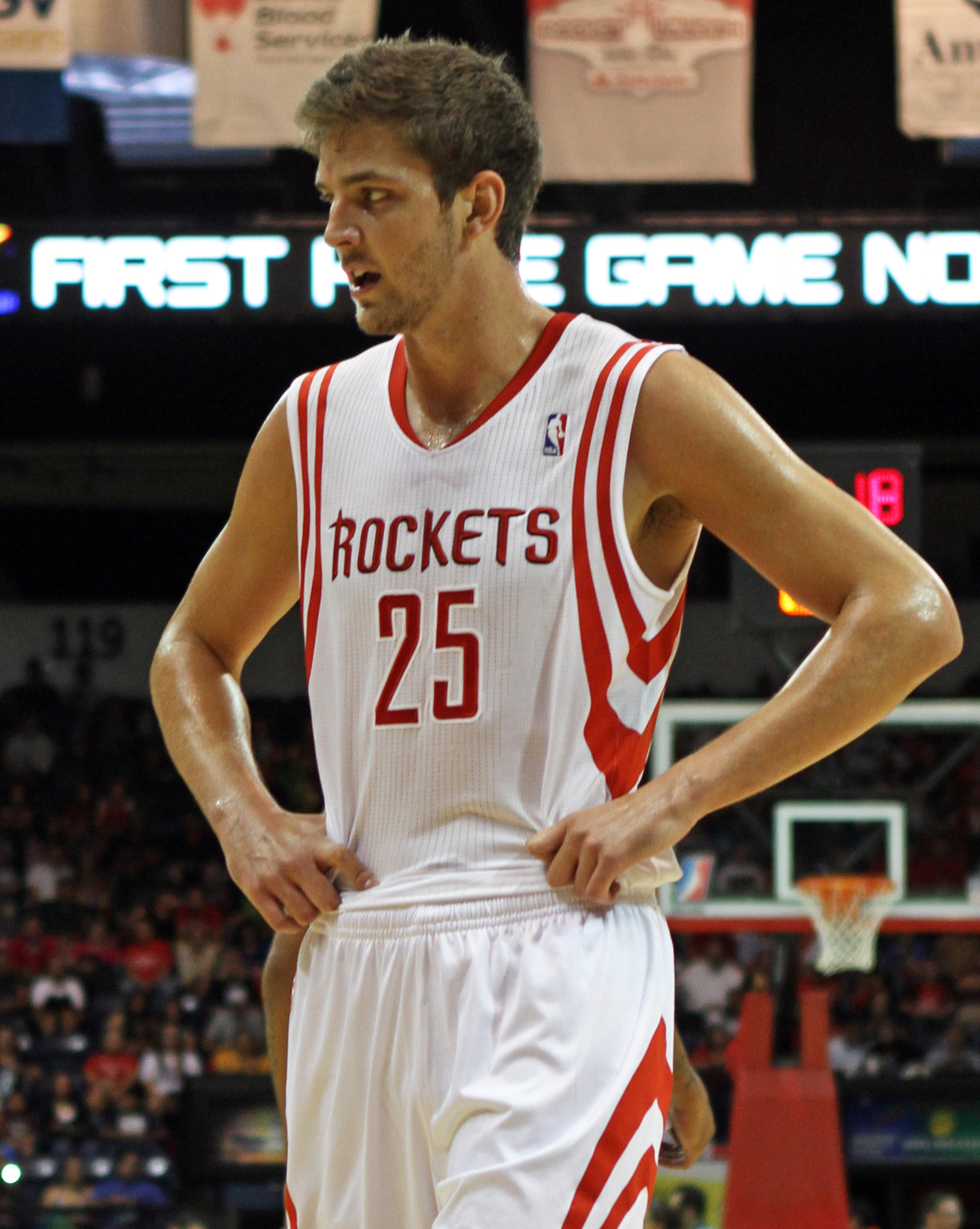
Parsons with the Rockets in October 2012

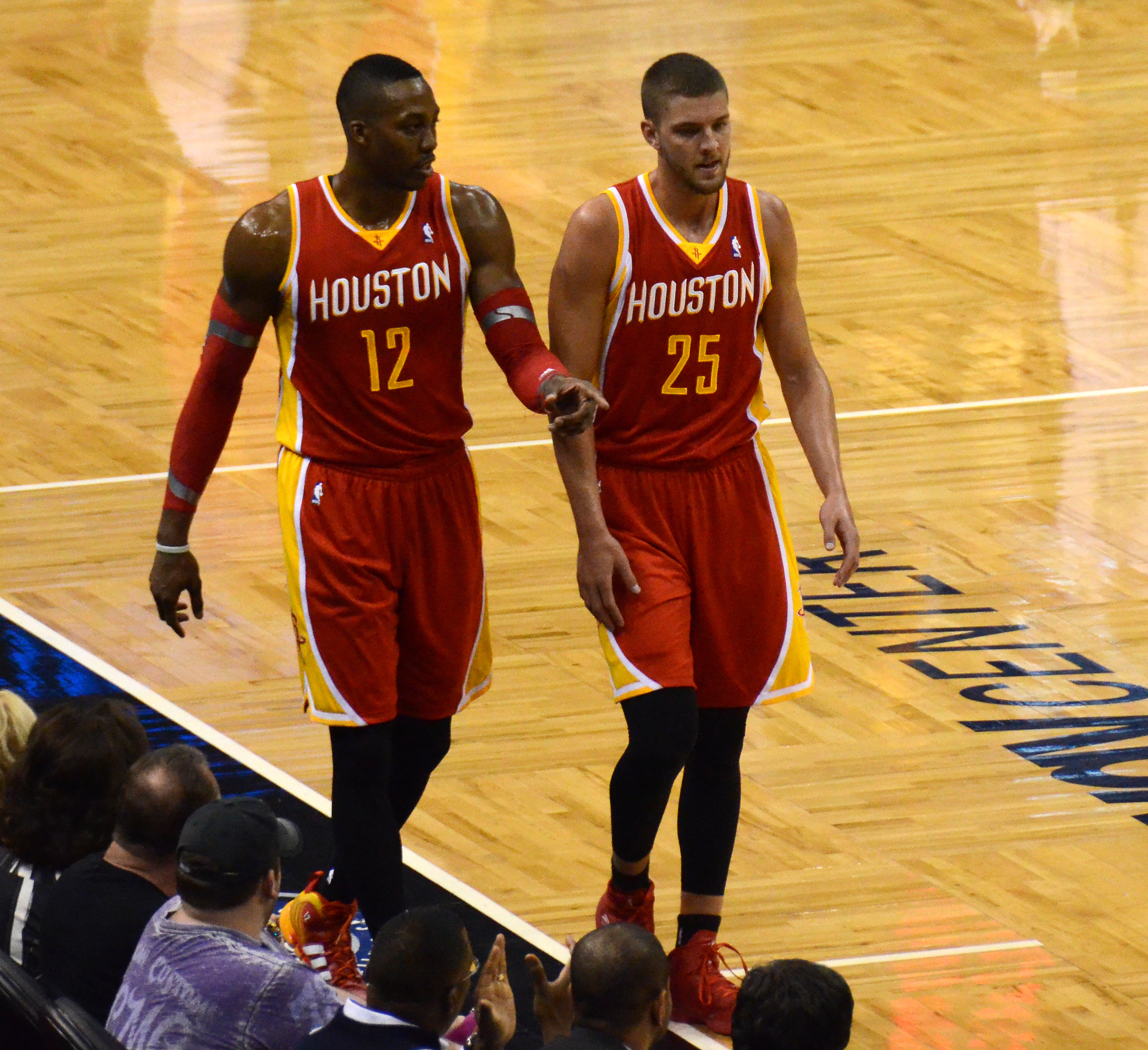
Parsons (right) with the Rockets in March 2014, alongside teammate Dwight Howard

Parsons was selected by the Houston Rockets with the 38th overall pick in the 2011 NBA draft. He played three games with French team Cholet Basket during the 2011 NBA lockout.

=== Houston Rockets (2011–2014) ===
Parsons signed with the Rockets on December 18, 2011. In the Rockets' season finale on April 22, 2012, Parsons scored a season-high 23 points against the Miami Heat. For the season, he was named to the NBA All-Rookie Second Team.

On November 12, 2012, Parsons scored a career-high 25 points against the Heat. On November 23, he set a new career high with 31 points against the New York Knicks. On March 3, 2013, Parsons scored a career-high 32 points on 12-for-13 shooting in a 136–103 win over the Dallas Mavericks.

On January 24, 2014, Parsons scored a career-high 34 points and made 10 3-pointers—all in the second half—in an 88–87 loss to the Memphis Grizzlies. He set an NBA record for 3s in a half and a franchise record for 3s in a game.

=== Dallas Mavericks (2014–2016) ===
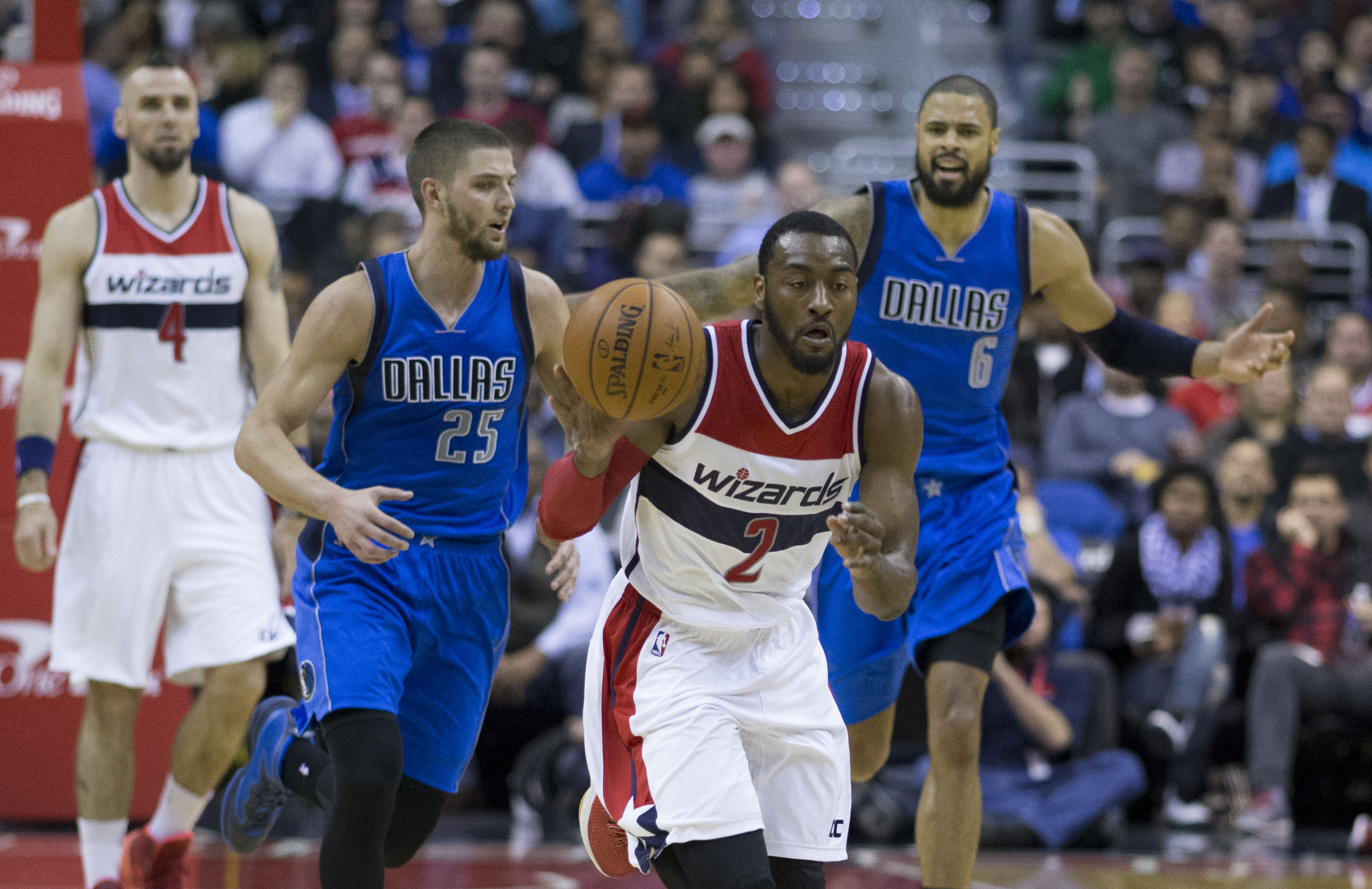
Parsons (#25) with the Mavericks in November 2014

After the 2013–14 season, Parsons became a restricted free agent. On July 10, 2014, he received a three-year, $46 million offer sheet from the Dallas Mavericks. The Rockets declined to match the offer and Parsons signed with the Mavericks on July 15.

On December 17, 2014, Parsons scored a season-high 32 points against the Detroit Pistons. On March 8, 2015, Parsons returned to action against the Los Angeles Lakers after a seven-game absence with a sprained left ankle. Parsons missed the final six regular-season games due to a right knee injury. He played in game one of the Mavericks' first-round playoff series against the Rockets, then missed the rest of the series with the same knee injury. He subsequently had knee surgery on May 1.

Parsons returned to action in the third game of the 2015–16 season, then dealt with strict minutes restrictions for the first six weeks of the season. On January 24, 2016, he scored a season-high 31 points in a 115–104 loss to the Rockets. On March 25, he underwent successful surgery to address the torn meniscus in his right knee, ruling him out for the rest of the season.

=== Memphis Grizzlies (2016–2019) ===
On July 7, 2016, Parsons signed a four-year, $94 million contract with the Memphis Grizzlies. Heading into training camp, Parsons was on light duties coming off knee surgery. He did not play in the preseason or in the first six games of the regular season. On November 6, he made his debut for the Grizzlies against the Portland Trail Blazers, but in 22 minutes as a starter, he missed all eight of his field goals attempts. He appeared in six games for the Grizzlies before missing the next 17 with a bone bruise on his left knee, making his return to the line-up on December 21 against the Detroit Pistons. On March 13, 2017, he was ruled out indefinitely after he was diagnosed with a partial tear of the meniscus in his left knee. He subsequently missed the rest of the season with a third knee injury in three years.

On October 28, 2017, Parsons scored 24 points on 9 of 11 from the field and 6 of 8 from 3-point range in a 103–89 win over the Houston Rockets. Parsons' 24 points were his best in 39 games with Memphis. Chandler had an extended stint on the sidelines between late December and mid-February due to right knee soreness. Despite only appearing in 36 games during the 2017–18 season, Parsons shot a career-best 42% from 3-point range.

Parsons earned a starting spot for the 2018–19 season out of training camp, but only played in the first three games before being sidelined with right knee soreness. By the close of December, Parsons was still sidelined by order of the organization despite having been medically cleared to return on December 21. The Grizzlies were keen for Parsons to spend time in the NBA G League with their affiliate team, the Memphis Hustle, before deciding on returning Parsons to the active roster with the Grizzlies. Parsons had been willing to play in the G League but wanted a clearer plan and a timetable in place that would return him to the Grizzlies' active roster. As a result, on January 6, he left the team indefinitely as the two sides worked to structure a resolution on his future. On February 9, it was announced that Parsons would return to the Grizzlies after the All-Star break. On February 22, after having not played since the third game of the season, Parsons returned to the rotation, playing almost 20 minutes and scoring three points on 1-of-7 shooting in a 112–106 loss to the Los Angeles Clippers.

=== Atlanta Hawks (2019–2020) ===
On July 6, 2019, Parsons was traded to the Atlanta Hawks for Solomon Hill and Miles Plumlee. Parsons was hit by a drunk driver on January 15, 2020; he had appeared in five games with the Hawks before the crash. On January 20, Parsons's attorney announced that his accident-related injuries could be career-ending. On February 5, Parsons was waived by the Hawks.

On January 18, 2022, Parsons announced his retirement from the NBA. He played a total of 440 games in the NBA and averaged 12.7 points, 4.5 rebounds and 2.7 assists per game.

== Career statistics ==
Legend
GP	Games played	GS	Games started	MPG	Minutes per game
FG%	Field goal percentage	3P%	3-point field goal percentage	FT%	Free throw percentage
RPG	Rebounds per game	APG	Assists per game	SPG	Steals per game
BPG	Blocks per game	PPG	Points per game	**Bold**	Career high

=== NBA ===
==== Regular season ====
Year	Team	GP	GS	MPG	FG%	3P%	FT%	RPG	APG	SPG	BPG	PPG
2011–12	Houston	63	57	28.6	.452	.337	.551	4.7	2.1	**1.2**	**.5**	9.5
2012–13	Houston	**76**	**76**	36.3	.486	.385	.729	5.3	3.5	1.0	.4	15.5
2013–14	Houston	74	74	**37.6**	.472	.370	.742	**5.5**	**4.0**	**1.2**	.4	**16.6**
2014–15	Dallas	66	66	33.1	.462	.380	.720	4.9	2.4	1.0	.3	15.7
2015–16	Dallas	61	51	29.5	**.492**	.416	.684	4.7	2.8	.8	.3	13.7
2016–17	Memphis	34	34	19.9	.338	.269	.814	2.5	1.6	.6	.1	6.2
2017–18	Memphis	36	8	19.2	.462	**.421**	.630	2.5	1.9	.5	.3	7.9
2018–19	Memphis	25	3	19.8	.374	.309	**.880**	2.8	1.7	.8	.2	7.5
2019–20	Atlanta	5	0	10.8	.278	.286	—	1.4	.6	.8	.2	2.8
Career		440	369	30.1	.462	.373	.713	4.5	2.7	.9	.3	12.7

==== Playoffs ====
Year	Team	GP	GS	MPG	FG%	3P%	FT%	RPG	APG	SPG	BPG	PPG
2013	Houston	**6**	**6**	39.7	**.452**	**.400**	.643	6.5	**3.7**	.2	**.3**	18.2
2014	Houston	**6**	**6**	**41.7**	.438	.361	**.733**	**6.8**	2.3	**.7**	**.3**	**19.3**
2015	Dallas	1	1	37.0	.333	.000	—	6.0	2.0	.0	.0	10.0
Career		13	13	40.4	.437	.363	.690	6.6	2.9	.4	.3	18.1

=== College ===
Year	Team	GP	GS	MPG	FG%	3P%	FT%	RPG	APG	SPG	BPG	PPG
2007–08	Florida	**36**	0	20.7	.472	.324	.627	4.0	1.4	.5	.2	8.1
2008–09	Florida	**36**	28	26.0	.460	.301	.557	5.7	1.8	**1.1**	**.4**	9.2
2009–10	Florida	34	18	31.0	**.493**	.358	**.662**	6.9	2.6	**1.1**	.1	**12.4**
2010–11	Florida	**36**	**35**	**34.1**	.480	**.368**	.557	**7.8**	**3.8**	.9	**.4**	11.3
Career		142	81	27.9	.477	.337	.611	6.0	2.4	.9	.3	10.2

== Other endeavors ==
In December 2013, Parsons appeared in print and video advertisements for Iconix Brand Group line Buffalo David Bitton with model Ashley Sky for the Spring 2014 line. In 2014, Parsons signed a sponsorship deal with Chinese shoe company Anta. The five-year deal was reportedly worth $1 million per year. Parsons also signed sponsorship deals with the Chinese telecommunications company ZTE and the California-based apparel manufacturer Stance. He is currently the co-host of the FanDuel online show Run it Back with Michelle Beadle and Lou Williams.

== Personal life ==
On January 15, 2020, Parsons was in a car accident in which his vehicle was hit by a drunk driver. Parsons's injuries included a traumatic brain injury, a disc herniation, and a torn labrum.

In November 2020, Parsons announced that he had become engaged to Haylee Harrison. In November 2021, TMZ.com reported that Parsons and Harrison had a child together. Also in November 2021, Parsons indicated that he was still recovering from the injuries he incurred in his January 2020 car accident. Parsons later received a substantial settlement from a lawsuit arising out of the accident.

== See also ==
- List of Florida Gators in the NBA
