= Erving Walker =

American basketball player (born 1990)

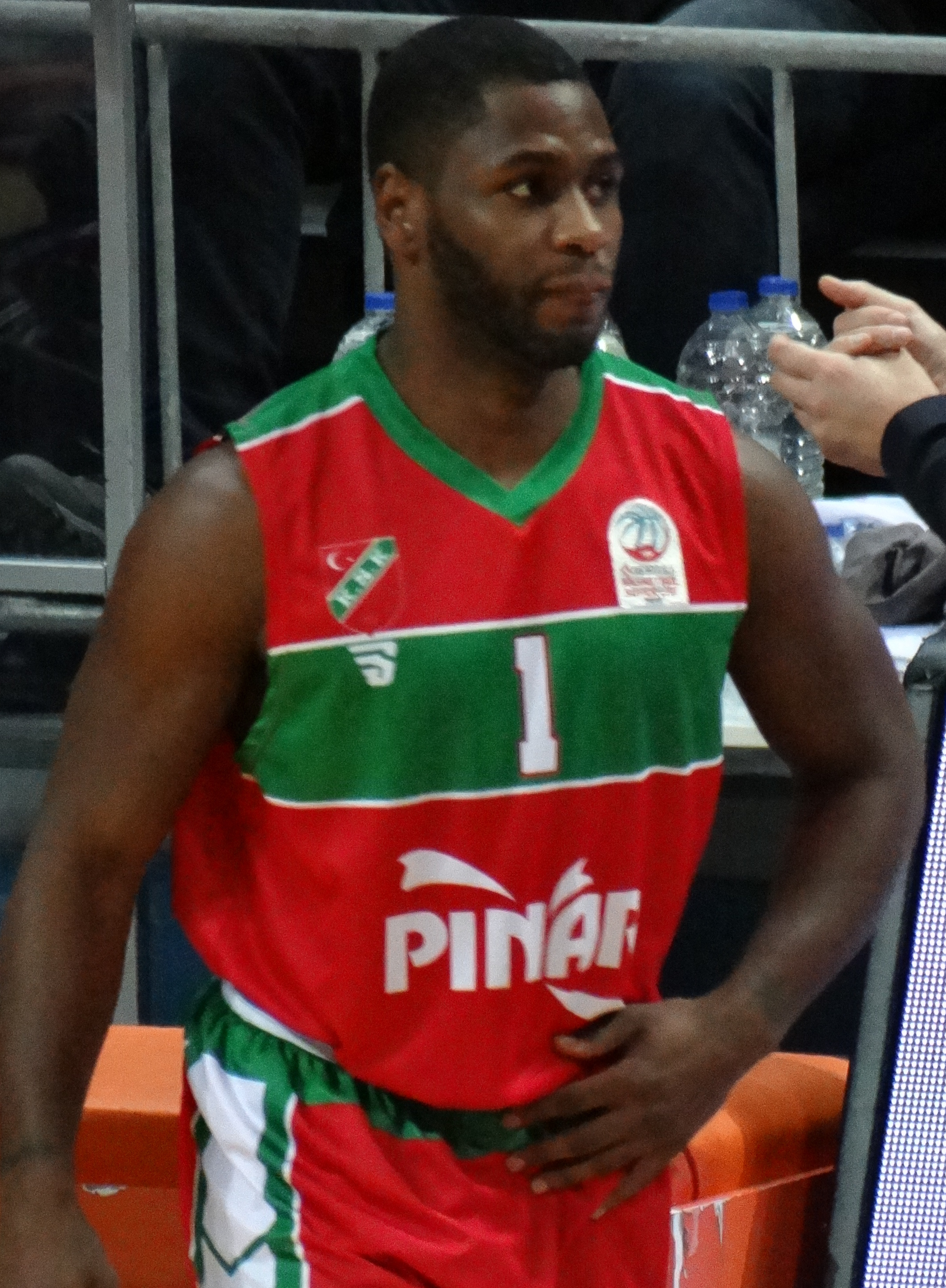
- Walker with Pınar Karşıyaka in 2018

Personal information
- Born: January 17, 1990 (age 36) Brooklyn, New York, U.S.
- Listed height: 5 ft 8 in (1.73 m)
- Listed weight: 176 lb (80 kg)

Career information
- High school: Christ the King (Queens, New York)
- College: Florida (2008–2012)
- NBA draft: 2012: undrafted
- Playing career: 2012–2021
- Position: Point guard
- Number: 1, 11, 9

Career history
- 2012–2013: Prima Veroli
- 2013–2014: Stelmet Zielona Góra
- 2014: Élan Chalon
- 2014–2015: JDA Dijon Basket
- 2015–2016: Büyükçekmece Basketbol
- 2016–2017: SIG Strasbourg
- 2017–2018: Büyükçekmece Basketbol
- 2018–2019: Pınar Karşıyaka
- 2019: Zamalek
- 2020–2021: Trepça

Career highlights
- BSL scoring leader (2018); Second-team All-SEC (2012)

Erving Walker (born January 17, 1990) is an American former professional basketball player. Standing at 5 ft 8 in (1.73 m), he played at the point guard position.

== High school career ==
During his sophomore season in Christ the King High school in New York in 2006, Walker was named to the 2006 1st annual Boost Mobile Elite24.

== College career ==
Erving played basketball for the Florida gators basketball team from 2008 to 2012 as a point guard wearing number 11. He was named to the 2012 All-SEC Second team during his senior season. He held the all-time leading assists record at Florida (547). The record was surpassed in 2018. He is still the fourth scoring leader (1,777 points).

During his senior season the Gators lost to Louisville in the Elite Eight of the NCAA Tournament

Walker averaged 12.1 points, 4.7 assists and 2.8 rebounds in his senior year at Florida

In 2012, "Walker was charged with petit theft and resisting an officer without violence at 1 a.m. ET March 30 after Gainesville Police Department officers apprehended him following a foot chase that also involved several police cars." "Judge Walter M. Green withheld adjudication and ordered Walker to pay the fine by September 27. The state dropped an additional misdemeanor charge of resisting arrest without violence as part of the agreement."

== Professional career ==
After going undrafted in the 2012 NBA draft, he signed with Prima Veroli of the Italian Second Division in the summer of 2012. He played 20 games, averaging 17.9 points and 3.6 assists per game.

In October 2013, after passing a tryout period, he signed a one-year deal with Stelmet Zielona Góra. He parted ways with them on January 28, 2014. On February 5, 2014, he signed with Élan Chalon for the rest of the 2013–14 season.

On June 23, 2014, he signed with JDA Dijon Basket for the 2014–15 season. Over 37 French League games played, he averaged 17.6 points, 6.1 assists and 3.1 rebounds per game on 41% shooting from the field. However, Dijon finished in 10th place not being able to make playoffs.

On July 8, 2015, he signed a one-year contract with Büyükçekmece Basketbol of the Turkish Basketball Super League.

On July 25, 2016, Walker signed with SIG Strasbourg for the 2016–17 season.

On June 27, 2017, Walker returned to Büyükçekmece Basketbol for the 2017–18 season. He averaged 18.5 points, 2.8 rebounds and 5.1 assists per game. On July 6, 2018, Walker signed with Pınar Karşıyaka.

=== The Basketball Tournament ===
In 2017, Walker played for the Kentucky Kings of The Basketball Tournament. Walker averaged 20.0 PPG to help his team advance to the second round of the tournament. The Basketball Tournament is an annual $2 million winner-take-all tournament broadcast on ESPN.

In TBT 2018, Walker suited up for Team Fancy. In 2 games, he averaged 11.5 points, 2.5 assists, 2 rebounds per game. Team Fancy reached the second round before falling to Boeheim's Army.

== Career statistics ==
Legend
GP	Games played	GS	Games started	MPG	Minutes per game
FG%	Field-goal percentage	3P%	3-point field-goal percentage	FT%	Free-throw percentage
RPG	Rebounds per game	APG	Assists per game	SPG	Steals per game
BPG	Blocks per game	PPG	Points per game	PIR	Performance index rating
**Bold**	Career high

=== EuroLeague ===
Year	Team	GP	GS	MPG	FG%	3P%	FT%	RPG	APG	SPG	BPG	PPG	PIR
2013–14	Zielona Góra	10	0	13.1	.377	.214	.857	1.1	1.5	.0	.0	5.8	4.8
Career		10	0	13.1	.377	.214	.857	1.1	1.5	.0	.0	5.8	4.8

== Personal life ==
Erving has recently featured in a YouTube series on Grit Media in a series called deployed. This also features other basketball players including Romeo Travis and Josh Childress
