= Patric Young =

American former professional basketball player (born 1992)

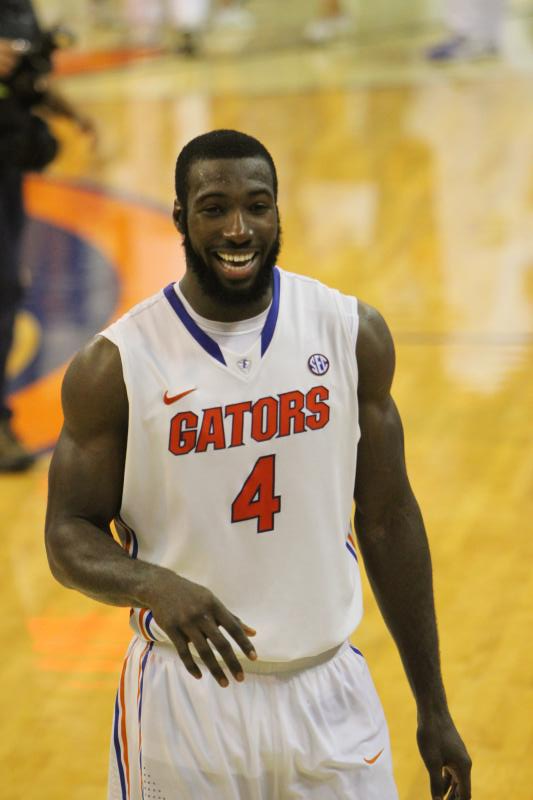
- Patric Young vs. Florida State

Personal information
- Born: February 1, 1992 (age 34) Jacksonville, Florida
- Listed height: 6 ft 10 in (2.08 m)
- Listed weight: 255 lb (116 kg)

Career information
- High school: Providence School (Jacksonville, Florida)
- College: Florida (2010–2014)
- NBA draft: 2014: undrafted
- Playing career: 2014–2019
- Position: Center
- Number: 4, 28

Career history
- 2014–2015: Galatasaray
- 2015–2017: Olympiacos
- 2018–2019: Felice Scandone

Career highlights
- Italian Super Cup winner (2017); SEC Defensive Player of the Year (2014); SEC All-Defensive Team (2014); Second-team All-SEC (2014); 3× SEC Scholar-Athlete of the Year (2012–2014); Third-team Academic All-American (2014); SEC All-Freshman Team (2011); McDonald's All-American (2010); Second-team Parade All-American (2010)
- Stats at Basketball Reference
Medals
Men's basketball
Representing the United States
FIBA Americas U18 Championship
Gold medal – first place	2010 San Antonio	Team

Patric Young (born February 1, 1992) is an American former professional basketball player. At 6 ft 10 in (2.08 m) tall, he played at the center position. He played college basketball for the University of Florida.

== College career ==
Young accepted an athletic scholarship to attend the University of Florida in Gainesville, Florida, where he was a member of coach Billy Donovan's Florida Gators men's basketball team from 2010 to 2014. In his four-year college career at Florida, Young became the 50th 1,000-point scorer in UF history, and finished his career 27th on the all-time scoring list, with 1,307 points. He also became the 11th Gator all-time with 1,300 points and 800 rebounds. Young never missed a game in his college basketball career, becoming the second player in Florida program history to appear in 150 games. As a senior, he was named NABC Pete Newell Big Man of the Year, AP and Senior CLASS All-American, CoSIDA Academic All-American, and SEC Defensive Player of the Year. He was also a two-time All-SEC Team member, earning second-team honors from coaches and the AP in 2014, and second-team honors from the coaches in 2013. Furthermore, he became the SEC league's first three-time winner of the SEC Scholar Athlete of the Year honor, earning the recognition in 2012, 2013, and 2014.

== Professional career ==
After going undrafted in the 2014 NBA draft, Young joined the New Orleans Pelicans for the 2014 NBA Summer League. On July 24, 2014, he signed with the Pelicans. On November 30, 2014, he was waived by the Pelicans before appearing in a game for them.

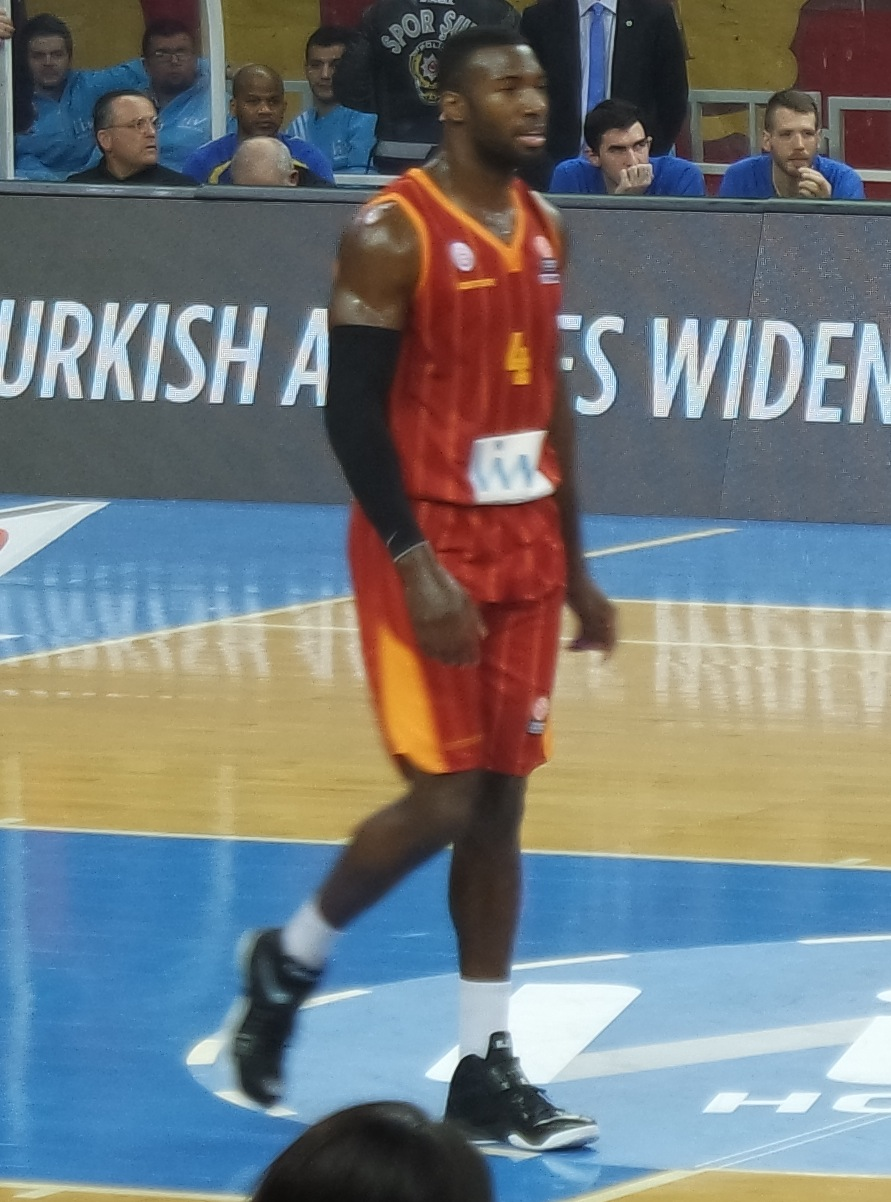
Young with Galatasaray in 2015.

On December 3, 2014, Young signed with Galatasaray Liv Hospital of Turkey for the rest of the 2014–15 season. In 24 Turkish League games, he averaged 10.5 points and 7.9 rebounds per game.

On June 27, 2015, Young joined the Phoenix Suns for the 2015 NBA Summer League. On July 17, 2015, he signed a two-year contract with the Greek club Olympiacos. On November 12, 2015, he suffered a torn ACL in a game against Anadolu Efes, and was shut down for the rest of the season.

On July 10, 2017, Young signed with Italian club Olimpia Milano. He was released on February 26, 2018, without ever appearing in a single game for the club due to injuries.

On December 6, 2018, Young signed a deal with Scandone Avellino.

On July 31, 2020, Young signed a deal with Hapoel Gilboa Galil in the Israeli Basketball Premier League. However, he parted ways with the team for personal reasons on October 9, 2020.

== Career statistics ==
Legend
GP	Games played	GS	Games started	MPG	Minutes per game
FG%	Field-goal percentage	3P%	3-point field-goal percentage	FT%	Free-throw percentage
RPG	Rebounds per game	APG	Assists per game	SPG	Steals per game
BPG	Blocks per game	PPG	Points per game	PIR	Performance index rating
**Bold**	Career high

=== EuroLeague ===
Year	Team	GP	GS	MPG	FG%	3P%	FT%	RPG	APG	SPG	BPG	PPG	PIR
2014–15	Galatasaray	17	**14**	**24.5**	.602	.000	.600	**6.4**	**.6**	.9	.8	8.7	13.2
2015–16	Olympiacos	5	5	19.6	**.714**	—	**.667**	5.0	.4	**1.2**	**2.6**	**10.8**	**17.4**
2016–17	Olympiacos	**30**	1	9.6	.500	.000	.615	2.4	.1	.3	.4	2.7	4.4
Career		52	20	15.4	.584	.000	.618	4.0	.3	.6	.7	5.5	8.5

== Broadcasting career ==
On September 13, 2021, Young announced that he had been hired by ESPN to become a studio host for the SEC Network’s college basketball coverage.

== Personal life ==
On June 29, 2022, Young was involved in a serious car accident in Nebraska that left him paralyzed from the waist down. Patric now leads the PY4Foundation offering support and hope to those facing life altering events as he did. Going through this drastic life event exposed the many financial and mental challenges that individuals face with sudden loss of limbs or paralysis. Patric has leaned into his faith to give hope to others and provide practical help to others. https://www.py4foundation.org/. He shares his journey on social media to provide inspiration and is a motivational speaker. Young recently wrote his first book Sit to Rise, available on his website or Amazon https://www.patricyoung.com/.
