= Kenny Boynton =

American basketball player (born 1991)

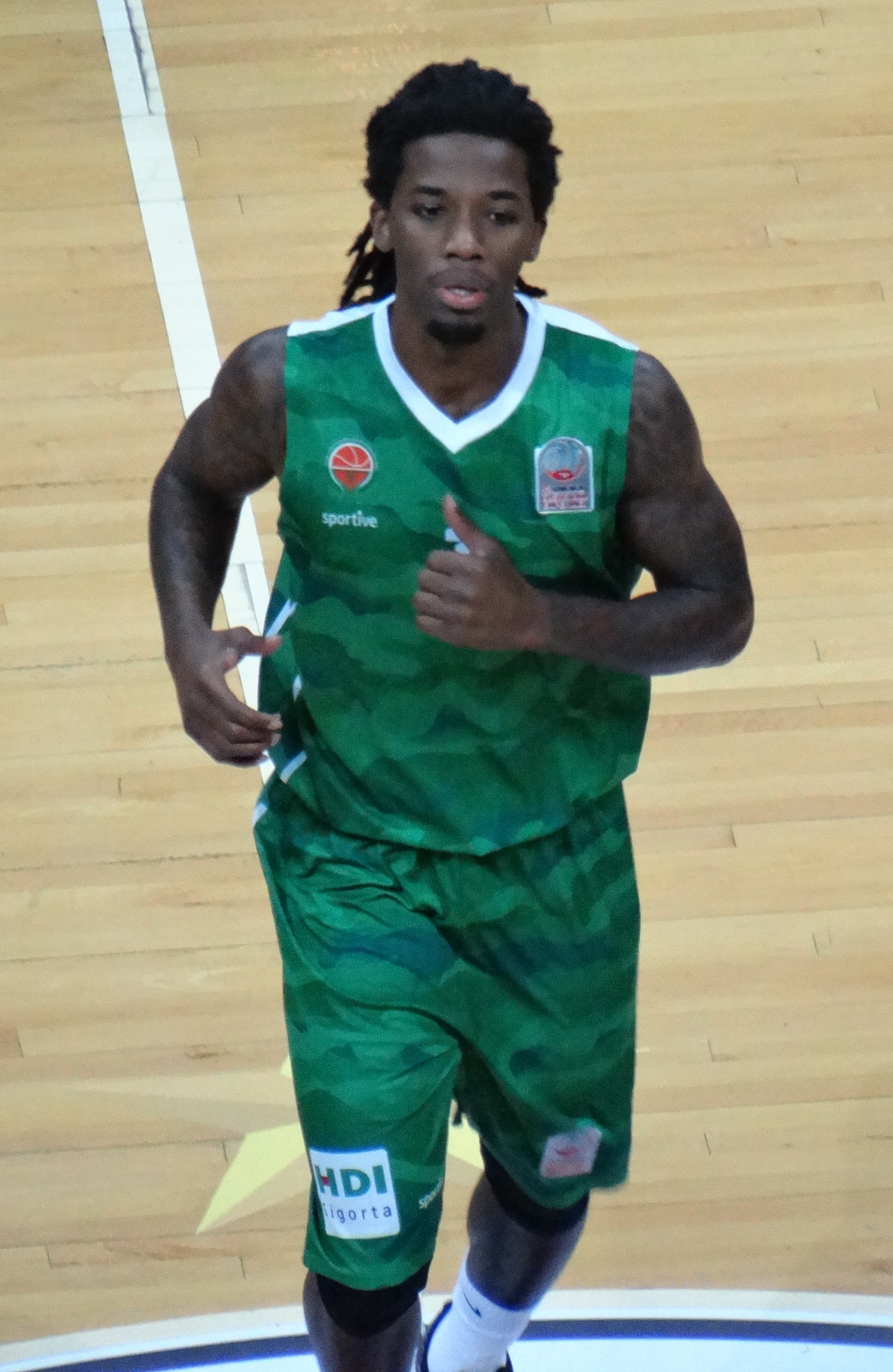
- Boynton with Yeşilgiresun in 2017

FIU Panthers

Personal information
- Born: May 12, 1991 (age 35) Pompano Beach, Florida, U.S.
- Listed height: 6 ft 2 in (1.88 m)
- Listed weight: 190 lb (86 kg)

Career information
- High school: American Heritage School (Plantation, Florida)
- College: Florida (2009–2013)
- NBA draft: 2013: undrafted
- Playing career: 2013–2026
- Position: Point guard / shooting guard
- Coaching career: 2026–present

Career history

Playing
- 2013: Barak Netanya
- 2013–2014: Hapoel Gilboa Galil
- 2014–2015: SOMB
- 2015–2016: Sinpaş Denizli
- 2016–2017: Nizhny Novgorod
- 2017–2018: Yeşilgiresun Belediye
- 2018: Hebei Xianglan
- 2018–2021: Shenzhen Leopards
- 2021–2023: Tianjin Pioneers
- 2023: BCM Gravelines-Dunkerque
- 2023: Sichuan Blue Whales
- 2024: Hapoel Haifa
- 2025: Zhejiang Lions

Coaching
- 2026: FIU (assistant)

Career highlights
- First-team All-SEC (2012); 2× Second-team All-SEC (2011, 2013); SEC All-Rookie team (2010); McDonald's All-American (2009); First-team Parade All-American (2009); Fourth-team Parade All-American (2008)

Kenneth Franklin Boynton (born May 12, 1991) is a former American professional basketball player who is now an assistant coach at FIU. He played college basketball for the University of Florida.

== High school ==
Boynton attended American Heritage School where he was a standout basketball player. In his senior season, Boynton averaged 33.0 points per game. He finished his high school career as the third-leading scorer in Florida high school basketball history. Kenny was also named to the 2009 McDonald's All-American Boys Game and the Parade All-America first team.

== College career ==
In his first season at Florida, Boynton averaged 14 points per game and 2.7 assists per game.

In Boynton's sophomore season, he had a slight increase in scoring, averaging 14.2 points per game to go along with 2.6 assists per game. He was also named to the All-SEC Second Team. In the 2011 NCAA Men's Division I Basketball Tournament, Florida reached the Elite Eight, but then lost to the Butler Bulldogs after Boynton missed a three pointer with less than 20 seconds left in the game.

On December 19, 2011, Boynton was named SEC Player of the Week after registering 22 points, two assists, one rebound and a steal in a win over Texas A&M. In Boynton's junior season, Florida once again made the NCAA Tournament, but lost to the Louisville Cardinals in the Elite Eight. On April 5, 2012 Boynton announced that he would return for his senior season at Florida.

In Boynton's senior season, the Gators advanced to the Elite Eight for the third consecutive year where they were defeated by Michigan.

== Professional career ==
After going undrafted in the 2013 NBA draft, Boynton was signed to the Lakers summer league team on July 2, 2013 but did not make the team.

He ultimately signed with Barak Netanya of Israel's Ligat HaAl. He got released after playing only 5 games with Netanya. On November 27, 2013 Boynton signed a 1-month deal with Hapoel Gilboa Galil.

For the 2016–17 season, Boynton signed with Nizhny Novgorod of the VTB United League and Eurocup. He signed with the Shenzhen Leopards of the Chinese Basketball Association on September 6, 2018.

On January 6, 2023, he signed with BCM Gravelines-Dunkerque of the LNB Pro A.

On December 15, 2023, Boynton signed with Sichuan Blue Whales of the Chinese Basketball Association (CBA).

On October 16, 2024, Boynton signed with Hapoel Haifa of the Israeli Basketball Premier League.

== Coaching career ==
On April 23, 2026, it was announced that Boynton was named be an assistant on Joey Cantens' inaugural staff at FIU. It is the first coaching role of Boynton's career.
