= Alabama Crimson Tide men's basketball statistical leaders =

The Alabama Crimson Tide men's basketball statistical leaders are individual statistical leaders of the Alabama Crimson Tide men's basketball program in various categories, including points, rebounds, assists, steals, and blocks. Within those areas, the lists identify single-game, single-season, and career leaders. The Crimson Tide represent the University of Alabama in the NCAA's Southeastern Conference.

Alabama began competing in intercollegiate basketball in 1912. However, the school's record book does not generally list records from before the 1950s, as records from before this period are often incomplete and inconsistent. Since scoring was much lower in this era, and teams played much fewer games during a typical season, it is likely that few or no players from this era would appear on these lists anyway.

The NCAA did not officially record assists as a stat until the 1983–84 season, and blocks and steals until the 1985–86 season, but Alabama's record books includes players in these stats before these seasons. These lists are updated through the end of the 2020–21 season.

== Scoring ==
Career
| Rk | Player | Points | Seasons |
|---|---|---|---|
| 1 | Reggie King | 2,168 | 1975-76 1976-77 1977-78 1978-79 |
| 2 | Mark Sears | 1,950 | 2022-23 2023-24 2024-25 |
| 3 | Eddie Phillips | 1,937 | 1978-79 1979-80 1980-81 1981-82 |
| 4 | Leon Douglas | 1,909 | 1972-73 1973-74 1974-75 1975-76 |
| 5 | Trevor Releford | 1,873 | 2010-11 2011-12 2012-13 2013-14 |
| 6 | Buck Johnson | 1,869 | 1982-83 1983-84 1984-85 1985-86 |
| 7 | Jerry Harper | 1,861 | 1952-53 1953-54 1954-55 1955-56 |
| 8 | James Robinson | 1,813 | 1990-91 1991-92 1992-93 |
| 9 | Erwin Dudley | 1,775 | 1999-00 2000-01 2001-02 2002-03 |
| 10 | Brian Williams | 1,759 | 1995-96 1996-97 1997-98 1998-99 |

Season
| Rk | Player | Points | Season |
|---|---|---|---|
| 1 | Mark Sears | 797 | 2023-24 |
| 2 | Reggie King | 747 | 1978-79 |
| 3 | Labaron Philon Jr. | 725 | 2025-26 |
| 4 | Brandon Miller | 696 | 2022-23 |
| 5 | Mark Sears | 690 | 2024-25 |
| 6 | James Robinson | 661 | 1991-92 |
| 7 | Collin Sexton | 632 | 2017-18 |
| 8 | Michael Ansley | 630 | 1988-89 |
| 9 | Latrell Sprewell | 623 | 1991-92 |
| 10 | Wendell Hudson | 620 | 1972-73 |

Single game
| Rk | Player | Points | Season | Opponent |
|---|---|---|---|---|
| 1 | Mike Nordholz | 50 | 1966-67 | Southern Miss |
| 2 | Jack Kubiszyn | 47 | 1956-57 | Mississippi College |
| 3 | Bob Andrews | 46 | 1964-65 | Tulane |
| 4 | Jack Kubiszyn | 45 | 1957-58 | Ole Miss |
| 5 | Reggie King | 43 | 1978-79 | Virginia |
| | Jerry Harper | 43 | 1955-56 | Georgia |
| 7 | Jack Kubiszyn | 41 | 1957-58 | Samford |
| | Jerry Harper | 41 | 1955-56 | Louisiana College |
| | Brandon Miller | 41 | 2022-23 | South Carolina |
| 10 | Collin Sexton | 40 | 2017-18 | Minnesota |

== Rebounds ==
Career
| Rk | Player | Rebounds | Seasons |
|---|---|---|---|
| 1 | Jerry Harper | 1,688 | 1952-53 1953-54 1954-55 1955-56 |
| 2 | Leon Douglas | 1,279 | 1972-73 1973-74 1974-75 1975-76 |
| | Reggie King | 1,279 | 1975-76 1976-77 1977-78 1978-79 |
| 4 | Erwin Dudley | 1,184 | 1999-00 2000-01 2001-02 2002-03 |
| 5 | Eddie Phillips | 1,129 | 1978-79 1979-80 1980-81 1981-82 |
| 6 | Bobby Lee Hurt | 1,012 | 1981-82 1982-83 1983-84 1984-85 |
| 7 | Michael Ansley | 968 | 1985-86 1986-87 1987-88 1988-89 |
| 8 | Buck Johnson | 933 | 1982-83 1983-84 1984-85 1985-86 |
| 9 | Robert Horry | 929 | 1988-89 1989-90 1990-91 1991-92 |
| 10 | Jermareo Davidson | 918 | 2003-04 2004-05 2005-06 2006-07 |

Season
| Rk | Player | Rebounds | Season |
|---|---|---|---|
| 1 | Jerry Harper | 517 | 1955-56 |
| 2 | Jerry Harper | 456 | 1954-55 |
| 3 | Jim Fulmer | 383 | 1956-57 |
| 4 | Wendell Hudson | 362 | 1972-73 |
| 5 | Erwin Dudley | 361 | 2000-01 |
| 6 | Reggie King | 359 | 1977-78 |
| 7 | Jerry Harper | 358 | 1952-53 |
| 8 | Jerry Harper | 357 | 1953-54 |
| 9 | Leon Douglas | 353 | 1974-75 |
| 10 | Leon Douglas | 348 | 1975-76 |

Single game
| Rk | Player | Rebounds | Season | Opponent |
|---|---|---|---|---|
| 1 | Jerry Harper | 33 | 1955-56 | Louisiana College |
| 2 | Harry Hammonds | 28 | 1965-66 | Massachusetts |
| | Jerry Harper | 28 | 1955-56 | Mississippi State |
| | Jerry Harper | 28 | 1955-56 | Georgia Tech |
| | Jerry Harper | 28 | 1955-56 | Vanderbilt |
| 6 | Jerry Harper | 27 | 1954-55 | Auburn |
| 7 | Leon Douglas | 25 | 1974-75 | Kentucky |
| | Jerry Harper | 25 | 1955-56 | St. John's |
| 9 | Jerry Harper | 24 | 1953-54 | Bradley |
| 10 | Richard Hendrix | 23 | 2007-08 | Troy |
| | Reggie King | 23 | 1976-77 | Oklahoma |

== Assists ==
Career
| Rk | Player | Assists | Seasons |
|---|---|---|---|
| 1 | Terry Coner | 664 | 1983-84 1984-85 1985-86 1986-87 |
| 2 | Gary Waites | 619 | 1987-88 1988-89 1989-90 1990-91 |
| 3 | Anthony Murray | 463 | 1974-75 1975-76 1976-77 1977-78 |
| 4 | Ronald Steele | 453 | 2004-05 2005-06 2006-07 2008-09 |
| 5 | Robert Scott | 444 | 1976-77 1977-78 1978-79 1979-80 |
| 6 | Eric Richardson | 443 | 1980-81 1981-82 1982-83 1983-84 |
| 7 | Mark Sears | 435 | 2022-23 2023-24 2024-25 |
| 8 | Ray Odums | 399 | 1971-72 1972-73 1973-74 |
| 9 | Ennis Whatley | 398 | 1981-82 1982-83 |
| 10 | Trevor Releford | 395 | 2010-11 2011-12 2012-13 2013-14 |

Season
| Rk | Player | Assists | Season |
|---|---|---|---|
| 1 | Terry Coner | 241 | 1985-86 |
| 2 | Ennis Whatley | 220 | 1982-83 |
| 3 | Gary Waites | 191 | 1988-89 |
| | Robert Scott | 191 | 1978-79 |
| 5 | Mark Sears | 190 | 2024-25 |
| 6 | Eric Richardson | 186 | 1983-84 |
| 7 | Terry Coner | 184 | 1984-85 |
| 8 | Ennis Whatley | 178 | 1981-82 |
| 9 | Ray Odums | 177 | 1972-73 |
| 10 | Gary Waites | 176 | 1990-91 |

Single game
| Rk | Player | Assists | Season | Opponent |
|---|---|---|---|---|
| 1 | Ronald Steele | 18 | 2004-05 | ETSU |
| 2 | Eric Richardson | 17 | 1983-84 | Kentucky |
| 3 | Eric Richardson | 14 | 1982-83 | Louisiana Tech |
| 4 | Terry Coner | 13 | 1984-85 | Georgia |
| | James Sanders | 13 | 1989-90 | Arizona |
| | Kira Lewis Jr. | 13 | 2019-20 | Auburn |
| 7 | Ennis Whatley | 12 | 1981-82 | Georgia |
| | Labaron Philon Jr. | 12 | 2025-26 | Texas Tech |
| 9 | Amari Allen | 11 | 2026-27 | Arkansas State |
| | Mark Sears | 11 | 2024-25 | Oklahoma |
| | Jahvon Quinerly | 11 | 2020-21 | Maryland |
| | Kira Lewis Jr. | 11 | 2019-20 | Ole Miss |
| | Mikhail Torrance | 11 | 2009-10 | LSU |
| | Terry Coner | 11 | 1985-86 | Mississippi State |
| | Terry Coner | 11 | 1985-86 | Ole Miss |
| | Terry Coner | 11 | 1985-86 | Vanderbilt |
| | Robert Scott | 11 | 1978-79 | Kentucky |

== Steals ==
Career
| Rk | Player | Steals | Seasons |
|---|---|---|---|
| 1 | Trevor Releford | 263 | 2010-11 2011-12 2012-13 2013-14 |
| 2 | Senario Hillman | 176 | 2006-07 2007-08 2008-09 2009-10 |
| 3 | Terry Coner | 174 | 1983-84 1984-85 1985-86 1986-87 |
| 4 | Robert Horry | 168 | 1988-89 1989-90 1990-91 1991-92 |
| 5 | Herbert Jones | 167 | 2017–18 2018–19 2019–20 2020–21 |
| 6 | Mike Davis | 165 | 1979-80 1980-81 1981-82 1982-83 |
| 7 | Antoine Pettway | 158 | 2000-01 2001-02 2002-03 2003-04 |
| 8 | Eric Richardson | 155 | 1980-81 1981-82 1982-83 1983-84 |
| 9 | Retin Obasohan | 154 | 2012-13 2013-14 2014-15 2015-16 |
| 10 | Levi Randolph | 150 | 2011-12 2012-13 2013-14 2014-15 |

Season
| Rk | Player | Steals | Season |
|---|---|---|---|
| 1 | Anthony Murray | 79 | 1977-78 |
| 2 | Terry Coner | 71 | 1984-85 |
| 3 | Trevor Releford | 70 | 2012-13 |
| 4 | Trevor Releford | 69 | 2013-14 |
| 5 | Antoine Pettway | 67 | 2003-04 |
| 6 | Trevor Releford | 64 | 2011-12 |
| | Keon Ellis | 64 | 2021-22 |
| 8 | Latrell Sprewell | 63 | 1991-92 |
| 9 | Ennis Whatley | 61 | 1982-83 |
| 10 | Trevor Releford | 60 | 2010-11 |
| | Mark Sears | 60 | 2023-24 |

Single game
| Rk | Player | Steals | Season | Opponent |
|---|---|---|---|---|
| 1 | Anthony Murray | 10 | 1978-79 | Michigan |
| 2 | Jeremy Hays | 8 | 1998-99 | Oregon State |
| 3 | Terry Coner | 7 | 1986-87 | Auburn |
| | Jim Farmer | 7 | 1986-87 | Appalachain State |
| | Anthony Murray | 7 | 1977-78 | Vanderbilt |
| 6 | Mark Sears | 6 | 2023-24 | Arizona |
| | Mark Sears | 6 | 2022-23 | Kentucky |
| | Trevor Releford | 6 | 2011-12 | Vanderbilt |
| | Tony Mitchell | 6 | 2009-10 | ULM |
| | Senario Hillman | 6 | 2008-09 | Quincy |
| | Latrell Sprewell | 6 | 1991-92 | LSU |
| | Mark Gottfried | 6 | 1985-86 | Mississippi State |
| | Mike Davis | 6 | 1981-82 | Georgia |

== Blocks ==
Career
| Rk | Player | Blocks | Seasons |
|---|---|---|---|
| 1 | Robert Horry | 286 | 1988-89 1989-90 1990-91 1991-92 |
| 2 | Roy Rogers | 266 | 1992-93 1993-94 1994-95 1995-96 |
| 3 | Leon Douglas | 235 | 1972-73 1973-74 1974-75 1975-76 |
| 4 | Donta Hall | 227 | 2015-16 2016-17 2017-18 2018-19 |
| 5 | Jermareo Davidson | 221 | 2003-04 2004-05 2005-06 2006-07 |
| 6 | JaMychal Green | 212 | 2008-09 2009-10 2010-11 2011-12 |
| 7 | Jimmie Taylor | 205 | 2013-14 2014-15 2015-16 2016-17 |
| 8 | Derrick McKey | 188 | 1984-85 1985-86 1986-87 |
| 9 | Bobby Lee Hurt | 187 | 1981-82 1982-83 1983-84 1984-85 |
| 10 | Richard Hendrix | 152 | 2005-06 2006-07 2007-08 |

Season
| Rk | Player | Blocks | Season |
|---|---|---|---|
| 1 | Roy Rogers | 156 | 1995-96 |
| 2 | Robert Horry | 121 | 1991-92 |
| 3 | Leon Douglas | 80 | 1974-75 |
| 4 | Leon Douglas | 78 | 1973-74 |
| 5 | Robert Horry | 77 | 1990-91 |
| | Leon Douglas | 77 | 1975-76 |
| 7 | Derrick McKey | 76 | 1985-86 |
| | Aiden Sherrell | 76 | 2025-26 |
| 9 | Derrick McKey | 75 | 1986-87 |
| 10 | JaMychal Green | 70 | 2010-11 |
| | Jermareo Davidson | 70 | 2006-07 |

Single game
| Rk | Player | Blocks | Season | Opponent |
|---|---|---|---|---|
| 1 | Roy Rogers | 14 | 1995-96 | Georgia |
| 2 | Roy Rogers | 10 | 1995-96 | LSU |
| 3 | Jermareo Davidson | 9 | 2006-07 | Southern Miss |
| | Roy Rogers | 9 | 1995-96 | Kentucky |
| 5 | Donta Hall | 8 | 2017-18 | Oklahoma |
| | Jermareo Davidson | 8 | 2006-07 | Texas Southern |
| | Roy Rogers | 8 | 1995-96 | Missouri |
| | Roy Rogers | 8 | 1995-96 | Illinois |
| | Roy Rogers | 8 | 1995-96 | New Mexico |
| | Cedric Moore | 8 | 1992-93 | Texas A&M |
| | Phillip Lockett | 8 | 1979-80 | Austin Peay |
| | Aiden Sherrell | 8 | 2025-26 | Clemson |
| | Aiden Sherrell | 8 | 2025-26 | Arizona |
