= 2012–13 Alabama Crimson Tide men's basketball team =

American college basketball season

2012–13 Alabama Crimson Tide men's basketball

2K Sports Classic Champions

NIT Quarterfinals
- Conference: Southeastern Conference
- Record: 23–13 (12–6 SEC)
- Head coach: Anthony Grant (4th season)
- Assistant coaches: Dan Hipsher (4th season); John Brannen (4th season); Tony Pujol (3rd season)
- Home arena: Coleman Coliseum (Capacity: 15,316)

2012–13 Southeastern Conference men's basketball standings
	Conf.				Overall
Team	W		L	PCT	W		L	PCT
No. 14 Florida	14	–	4	.778	29	–	8	.784
Ole Miss †	12	–	6	.667	27	–	9	.750
Alabama	12	–	6	.667	23	–	13	.639
Kentucky	12	–	6	.667	21	–	12	.636
Missouri	11	–	7	.611	23	–	11	.676
Tennessee	11	–	7	.611	20	–	13	.606
Arkansas	10	–	8	.556	19	–	13	.594
LSU	9	–	9	.500	19	–	12	.613
Georgia	9	–	9	.500	15	–	17	.469
Vanderbilt	8	–	10	.444	16	–	17	.485
Texas A&M	7	–	11	.389	18	–	15	.545
South Carolina	4	–	14	.222	14	–	18	.438
Mississippi State	4	–	14	.222	10	–	22	.313
Auburn	3	–	15	.167	9	–	23	.281
† 2013 SEC tournament winner As of March 31, 2013; Rankings from AP poll

The 2012–13 Alabama Crimson Tide men's basketball team (variously "Alabama", "UA", "Bama" or "The Tide") represented the University of Alabama in the 2012–13 college basketball season. The team's head coach was Anthony Grant, who was in his fourth season at Alabama after posting a 21–12 record in the 2011–12 season, where the Crimson Tide finished fifth in the SEC and received a bid to the 2012 NCAA Division I men's basketball tournament. The team played their home games at Coleman Coliseum in Tuscaloosa, Alabama, as a member of the Southeastern Conference.

== Pre-season ==
The 2011–12 season was the third under head coach Anthony Grant and was the 99th season of basketball in the school's history. The squad finished the season 21–12 overall (9–7 SEC) and finished in 5th place. They were defeated by Florida in the quarterfinals of the 2012 SEC men's basketball tournament, and they lost to Creighton in the second round of the NCAA Tournament.

=== Departures ===
Name	Number	Pos.	Height	Weight	Year	Hometown	Notes
JaMychal Green	1	C	6'8"	235	Senior	Montgomery, Alabama	Graduated
Ben Eblen	2	G	6'0"	191	Junior	Isle of Palms, South Carolina	Left team
Tony Mitchell	5	F	6'6"	215	Junior	Swainsboro, Georgia	Entered 2012 NBA draft
Charles Hankerson	10	G	6'4"	210	Sophomore	Miami, Florida	Transferred to Wyoming

=== Class of 2012 signees ===
College recruiting information
Name	Hometown	School	Height	Weight	Commit date
Devonta Pollard; F	Porterville, Mississippi	Kemper County	6 ft 7 in (2.01 m)	190 lb (86 kg)	Jun 1, 2012
Devonta Pollard; F	Recruit ratings: Scout: Rivals: (97)				
Overall recruit ranking: Scout: NR Rivals: NR ESPN: NR
Note: In many cases, Scout, Rivals, 247Sports, On3, and ESPN may conflict in their listings of height and weight.; In these cases, the average was taken. ESPN grades are on a 100-point scale.; Sources: "Alabama Basketball Commitments". Rivals.; "2012 Alabama Basketball Commits". Scout.; "ESPN". ESPN.; "Scout.com Team Recruiting Rankings". Scout.; "2012 Team Ranking". Rivals.

== Roster ==
2012–13 Alabama Crimson Tide men's basketball team
Players
Coaches

Pos.	#	Name	Height	Weight	Year	Hometown
C	4	Carl Engström (injured)	7 ft 1 in (2.16 m)	285 lb (129 kg)	Jr	Ystad, Sweden
G	5	Trevor Lacey	6 ft 3 in (1.91 m)	215 lb (98 kg)	So	Huntsville, Alabama
G	12	Trevor Releford	6 ft 0 in (1.83 m)	195 lb (88 kg)	Jr	Shawnee Mission, Kansas
C	14	Moussa Gueye	7 ft 0 in (2.13 m)	255 lb (116 kg)	Jr	Dakar, Senegal
F	15	Nick Jacobs	6 ft 8 in (2.03 m)	265 lb (120 kg)	So	Atlanta
G	20	Levi Randolph	6 ft 5 in (1.96 m)	205 lb (93 kg)	So	Madison, Alabama
F	21	Rodney Cooper	6 ft 6 in (1.98 m)	215 lb (98 kg)	So	Phenix City, Alabama
G	22	Andrew Steele (injured)	6 ft 4 in (1.93 m)	225 lb (102 kg)	RS Sr	Birmingham, Alabama
F	24	Devonta Pollard	6 ft 8 in (2.03 m)	200 lb (91 kg)	Fr	Porterville, Mississippi
G	32	Retin Obasohan	6 ft 1 in (1.85 m)	210 lb (95 kg)	RS Fr	Antwerp, Belgium

Head coach

- Anthony Grant (Dayton)

Assistant coach(es)

- Dan Hipsher (Bowling Green)
- John Brannen (Marshall)
- Tony Pujol (Sterling College)

Legend

- (C) Team captain
- (S) Suspended
- (I) Ineligible
- (W) Walk-on
- Injured
- Current redshirt

Roster

=== Depth chart ===
Pos.	Starting 5	Bench	Bench 3
C	Nick Jacobs	Moussa Gueye	Carl Engström
PF	Rodney Cooper	Devonta Pollard
SF	Levi Randolph
SG	Trevor Lacey	Andrew Steele
PG	Trevor Releford	Retin Obasohan

== Schedule and results ==
Date time, TV	Rank^{#}	Opponent^{#}	Result	Record	High points	High rebounds	High assists	Site (attendance) city, state
Exhibition
November 6, 2012*; 7:00 pm		Stillman	W 76–68	-	16 – Jacobs	7 – Pollard	4 – Lacey	Coleman Coliseum (10,547); Tuscaloosa, Alabama
Non-conference regular season
November 9, 2012*; 8:00 pm, ESPNU		South Dakota State; 2K Sports Classic	W 70–67	1–0	18 – Releford	6 – Randolph	4 – Steele	Coleman Coliseum (11,669); Tuscaloosa, Alabama
November 11, 2012*; 5:00 pm		West Alabama	W 80–49	2–0	23 – Lacey	7 – Cooper	4 – Lacey	Coleman Coliseum (10,443); Tuscaloosa, Alabama
November 15, 2012*; 6:00 pm, ESPN2		vs. Oregon State; 2K Sports Classic	W 65–62	3–0	20 – Lacey	4 – Pollard	5 – Releford	Madison Square Garden (6,149); New York, NY
November 16, 2012*; 6:30 pm, ESPN2		vs. Villanova; 2K Sports Classic	W 77–55	4–0	25 – Releford	5 – Tied	4 – Tied	Madison Square Garden (6,177); New York
November 23, 2012*; 7:00 pm		Charleston Southern	W 59–46	5–0	22 – Releford	8 – Engstrom	6 – Tied	Coleman Coliseum (12,425); Tuscaloosa, Alabama
November 27, 2012*; 7:00 pm		Lamar	W 75–47	6–0	17 – Cooper	9 – Gueye	3 – Cooper, Lacey, Randolph	Coleman Coliseum (10,436); Tuscaloosa, Alabama
December 1, 2012*; 2:00 pm, ESPN2		at #17 Cincinnati; SEC–Big East Challenge	L 56–58	6–1	16 – Lacey	7 – Lacey	3 – Lacey	Fifth Third Arena (10,155); Cincinnati
December 5, 2012*; 8:00 pm, CSS/ESPN3		Dayton	L 76–81	6–2	16 – Lacey	7 – Cooper	5 – Lacey	Coleman Coliseum (11,460); Tuscaloosa, Alabama
December 15, 2012*; 3:00 pm, CBSSN		at VCU	L 54–73	6–3	13 – Pollard	8 – Pollard	2 – Lacey, Slaughter	Stuart C. Siegel Center (7,693); Richmond, Virginia
December 19, 2012*; 7:00 pm, ESPN3		at Texas Tech	W 66–62	7–3	22 – Crockett	11 – Crockett	4 – Robinson	United Spirit Arena (7,172); Lubbock, Texas
December 22, 2012*; 1:00 pm, CSS/ESPN3		Mercer	L 59–66	7–4	19 – Releford	7 – Cooper	3 – Lacey	Coleman Coliseum (10,243); Tuscaloosa, Alabama
December 30, 2012*; 5:00 pm, ESPNU		Tulane	L 50–53	7–5	12 – Jacobs, Lacey	6 – Lacey, Gueye	2 – Releford, Lacey, Randolph	Coleman Coliseum (12,445); Tuscaloosa, Alabama
January 5, 2013*; 3:00 pm, CSS/ESPN3		Oakland	W 65–45	8–5	18 – Releford	9 – Gueye	7 – Lacey	Coleman Coliseum (10,081); Tuscaloosa, Alabama
SEC Regular Season
January 8, 2013; 6:00 pm, ESPN		at No. 10 Missouri	L 68–84	8–6 (0–1)	26 – Releford	7 – Cooper	3 – Releford	Mizzou Arena (13,895); Columbia, Missouri
January 12, 2013; 12:00 pm, ESPN2		Tennessee	W 68–65	9–6 (1–1)	15 – Releford, Lacey	6 – Randolph	3 – Cooper, Randolph	Coleman Coliseum (12,093); Tuscaloosa, Alabama
January 16, 2013; 8:00 pm, CSS/ESPN3		at Mississippi State	W 75–43	10–6 (2–1)	18 – Randolph	11 – Jacobs	6 – Lacey	Humphrey Coliseum (7,182); Starkville, Mississippi
January 19, 2013; 5:00 pm, FSN/ESPN3		Texas A&M	W 50–49	11–6 (3–1)	15 – Releford	6 – Lacey	5 – Lacey	Coleman Coliseum (13,741); Tuscaloosa, Alabama
January 22, 2013; 8:00 pm, ESPN		Kentucky	W 59–55	12–6 (4–1)	14 – Jacobs	6 – Cooper	4 – Lacey	Coleman Coliseum (15,383); Tuscaloosa, Alabama
January 26, 2013; 1:00 pm, ESPN2		at Tennessee	L 53–54	12–7 (4–2)	18 – Releford	4 – Cooper, Lacey	4 – Releford, Lacey	Thompson–Boling Arena (18,791); Knoxville, Tennessee
January 31, 2013; 8:00 pm, ESPN2		Arkansas	W 59–56	13–7 (5–2)	14 – Lacey	7 – Gueye, Pollard	3 – Randolph	Coleman Coliseum (11,132); Tuscaloosa, Alabama
February 2, 2013; 3:00 pm, SECN/ESPN3		at Vanderbilt	W 58–54	14–7 (6–2)	17 – Lacey	7 – Cooper	2 – Tied	Memorial Gymnasium (12,345); Nashville, Tennessee
February 6, 2013; 7:00 pm, SECN/ESPN3		at Auburn	L 37–49	14–8 (6–3)	11 – Releford, Cooper	7 – Cooper, Randolph	3 – Randolph	Auburn Arena (7,502); Auburn, Alabama
February 9, 2013; 7:00 pm, ESPN2		LSU	W 60–57	15–8 (7–3)	15 – Jacobs	7 – Lacey	4 – Steele	Coleman Coliseum (13,511); Tuscaloosa, Alabama
February 12, 2013; 8:00 pm, ESPNU		at Georgia	W 52–45	16–8 (8–3)	14 – Cooper	7 – Randolph	3 – Lacey	Stegeman Coliseum (5,385); Athens, Georgia
February 16, 2013; 3:00 pm, SECN/ESPN3		South Carolina	W 68–58	17–8 (9–3)	17 – Lacey	9 – Randolph	5 – Releford	Coleman Coliseum (13,112); Tuscaloosa, Alabama
February 20, 2013; 7:00 pm, SECN/ESPN3		Mississippi State	W 64–56	18–8 (10–3)	20 – Cooper	10 – Cooper	5 – Releford	Coleman Coliseum (10,682); Tuscaloosa, Alabama
February 23, 2013; 12:45 pm, SECN/ESPN3		at LSU	L 94–97 ^{3OT}	18–9 (10–4)	36 – Releford	9 – Cooper	3 – Releford	Maravich Center (8,200); Baton Rouge, Louisiana
February 26, 2013; 6:00 pm, ESPNU		Auburn	W 61–43	19–9 (11–4)	21 – Releford	10 – Jacobs	2 – Tied	Coleman Coliseum (12,633); Tuscaloosa, Alabama
March 2, 2013; 11:00 am, ESPN		at #8 Florida	L 52–64	19–10 (11–5)	12 – Releford	5 – Tied	4 – Releford	O'Connell Center (11,624); Gainesville, Florida
March 5, 2013; 8:00 pm, ESPNU		at Ole Miss	L 83–87	19–11 (11–6)	19 – Lacey	9 – Jacobs	7 – Lacey	Tad Smith Coliseum (5,913); Oxford, Mississippi
March 9, 2013; 3:00 pm, SECN/ESPN3		Georgia	W 61–58	20–11 (12–6)	19 – Releford	5 – Jacobs	2 – Releford, Lacey	Coleman Coliseum (13,166); Tuscaloosa, Alabama
2013 SEC tournament
March 15, 2013*; 2:30 pm, SECN/ESPNU	(4)	vs. (5) Tennessee; Quarterfinals	W 58–48	21–11	15 – Randolph	12 – Jacobs	2 – Lacey	Bridgestone Arena (15,649); Nashville, Tennessee
March 16, 2013*; 12:00 pm, ABC/ESPN3	(4)	vs. (1) No. 13 Florida; SEC Tournament semifinals	L 51–61	21–12	12 – Releford	5 – Gueye, Lacey	2 – Releford, Lacey	Bridgestone Arena (14,574); Nashville, Tennessee
2013 NIT
March 19, 2013*; 8:00 pm, ESPN2	(1)	(8) Northeastern; First Round	W 62–43	22–12	13 – Randolph	6 – Gueye, Jacobs, Pollard	4 – Lacey	Coleman Coliseum (2,889); Tuscaloosa, Alabama
March 23, 2013*; 11:00 am, ESPN	(1)	(4) Stanford; Second Round	W 66–54	23–12	16 – Randolph	8 – Pollard	2 – Releford, Cooper, Pollard	Coleman Coliseum (6,148); Tuscaloosa, Alabama
March 26, 2013*; 6:30 pm, ESPN	(1)	(2) Maryland; Quarterfinals	L 57–58	23–13	15 – Randolph	5 – Cooper	8 – Lacey	Coleman Coliseum (9,479); Tuscaloosa, Alabama
*Non-conference game. ^{#}Rankings from AP Poll. (#) Tournament seedings in parentheses. All times are in Central Time. (#)Tournament seed within region.

Source: 2012–13 Schedule. Rolltide.com

== Rankings ==
Ranking movement Legend: ██ Increase in ranking. ██ Decrease in ranking.
Poll	Pre	Wk 1	Wk 2	Wk 3	Wk 4	Wk 5	Wk 6	Wk 7	Wk 8	Wk 9	Wk 10	Wk 11	Wk 12	Wk 13	Wk 14	Wk 15	Wk 16	Wk 17	Wk 18	Final
AP	NR	NR	NR	NR	NR	NR														
Coaches	NR	NR	NR	NR	NR	NR														

== See also ==
- Iron Bowl of Basketball
- 2012–13 NCAA Division I men's basketball season
- 2012–13 NCAA Division I men's basketball rankings
