= 2011–12 Alabama Crimson Tide men's basketball team =

American college basketball season

2011–12 Alabama Crimson Tide men's basketball

Puerto Rico Tip-Off Champions

NCAA Tournament, Round of 64
- Conference: Southeastern Conference
- Record: 21–12 (9–7 SEC)
- Head coach: Anthony Grant (3rd season)
- Assistant coaches: Dan Hipsher (3rd season); John Brannen (3rd season); Tony Pujol (2nd season)
- Home arena: Coleman Coliseum (Capacity: 15,316)

2011–12 Southeastern Conference men's basketball standings
	Conf.				Overall
Team	W		L	PCT	W		L	PCT
No. 1 Kentucky	16	–	0	1.000	38	–	2	.950
No. 25 Florida	10	–	6	.625	26	–	11	.703
No. 20 Vanderbilt †	10	–	6	.625	25	–	11	.694
Tennessee	10	–	6	.625	19	–	15	.559
Alabama	9	–	7	.563	21	–	12	.636
Mississippi State	8	–	8	.500	21	–	12	.636
Ole Miss	8	–	8	.500	20	–	14	.588
LSU	7	–	9	.438	18	–	15	.545
Arkansas	6	–	10	.375	18	–	14	.563
Auburn	5	–	11	.313	15	–	16	.484
Georgia	5	–	11	.313	15	–	17	.469
South Carolina	2	–	14	.125	10	–	21	.323
† 2012 SEC tournament winner As of April 2, 2012; Rankings from AP poll

The 2011–12 Alabama Crimson Tide men's basketball team (variously "Alabama", "UA", "Bama" or "The Tide") represented the University of Alabama in the 2011–12 college basketball season. The team's head coach was Anthony Grant, in his third season at Alabama after posting a 25–12 record the previous year. The team played their home games at Coleman Coliseum in Tuscaloosa, Alabama, as a member of the Southeastern Conference. This was the 99th season of basketball in the school's history. They finished the season 21–12 overall, 9–7 SEC play, and finished in 5th place. They were defeated by Florida in the quarterfinals of the 2012 SEC men's basketball tournament, and they lost to Creighton in the 2012 NCAA Division I men's basketball tournament first round.

== Pre-season ==
The 2010–11 season was the second under head coach Anthony Grant. The Tide finished the season 25–12 (12–4 SEC), winning the Southeastern Conference Western Division, and finishing second in the 2011 National Invitation Tournament. The Crimson Tide had four players graduate and two transfer after the season ended. They also brought in five freshman recruits and one junior college transfer, finishing fifth in Rivals.com team recruiting rankings.

=== Class of 2011 signees ===
College recruiting information
Name	Hometown	School	Height	Weight	Commit date
Trevor Lacey; G	Huntsville, Alabama	S.R. Butler HS	6 ft 3 in (1.91 m)	190 lb (86 kg)	May 18, 2011
Trevor Lacey; G	Recruit ratings: Scout: Rivals: (96)				
Levi Randolph; G	Madison, Alabama	Bob Jones HS	6 ft 5 in (1.96 m)	180 lb (82 kg)	May 20, 2010
Levi Randolph; G	Recruit ratings: Scout: Rivals: (96)				
Nick Jacobs; F	Atlanta, Georgia	South Atlanta HS	6 ft 8 in (2.03 m)	255 lb (116 kg)	Oct 26, 2010
Nick Jacobs; F	Recruit ratings: Scout: Rivals: (92)				
Rodney Cooper; F	Seale, Alabama	Russell County HS	6 ft 6 in (1.98 m)	200 lb (91 kg)	May 20, 2010
Rodney Cooper; F	Recruit ratings: Scout: Rivals: (91)				
Moussa Gueye; C	Dakar, Senegal	Lake Land CC	7 ft 0 in (2.13 m)	225 lb (102 kg)	Oct 4, 2010
Moussa Gueye; C	Recruit ratings: Scout: Rivals: (88)				
Retin Obasohan; G	Antwerp, Belgium	K.A. Redingenhof	6 ft 1 in (1.85 m)	205 lb (93 kg)	May 20, 2011
Retin Obasohan; G	Recruit ratings: Scout: Rivals: (N/A)				
Overall recruit ranking: Scout: 14 Rivals: 5 ESPN: 13
Note: In many cases, Scout, Rivals, 247Sports, On3, and ESPN may conflict in their listings of height and weight.; In these cases, the average was taken. ESPN grades are on a 100-point scale.; Sources: "Alabama Basketball Commitments". Rivals.; "2011 Alabama Basketball Commits". Scout.; "ESPN". ESPN.; "Scout.com Team Recruiting Rankings". Scout.; "2011 Team Ranking". Rivals.

== Roster ==
2011–12 Alabama Crimson Tide men's basketball team
Players
Coaches

Pos.	#	Name	Height	Weight	Year	Hometown
F	1	JaMychal Green	6 ft 8 in (2.03 m)	228 lb (103 kg)	Sr	Montgomery, Alabama
G	2	Charles Hankerson	6 ft 5 in (1.96 m)	210 lb (95 kg)	So	Miami, Florida
G	3	Trevor Lacey	6 ft 3 in (1.91 m)	190 lb (86 kg)	Fr	Huntsville, Alabama
C	4	Carl Engström	7 ft 1 in (2.16 m)	250 lb (113 kg)	So	Ystad, Sweden
F	5	Tony Mitchell (S)	6 ft 6 in (1.98 m)	210 lb (95 kg)	Jr	Swainsboro, Georgia
G	10	Ben Eblen	6 ft 0 in (1.83 m)	191 lb (87 kg)	Jr	Isle of Palms, South Carolina
G	12	Trevor Releford	6 ft 1 in (1.85 m)	180 lb (82 kg)	So	Shawnee Mission, Kansas
F	13	Dakota Slaughter	6 ft 6 in (1.98 m)	215 lb (98 kg)	Fr	Fishers, Indiana
C	14	Moussa Gueye	7 ft 0 in (2.13 m)	280 lb (127 kg)	So	Dakar, Senegal
F	15	Nick Jacobs	6 ft 8 in (2.03 m)	255 lb (116 kg)	Fr	Atlanta
G	20	Levi Randolph	6 ft 5 in (1.96 m)	185 lb (84 kg)	Fr	Madison, Alabama
F	21	Rodney Cooper	6 ft 6 in (1.98 m)	205 lb (93 kg)	Fr	Phenix City, Alabama
G	22	Andrew Steele	6 ft 4 in (1.93 m)	230 lb (104 kg)	Jr	Birmingham, Alabama
G	32	Retin Obasohan	6 ft 1 in (1.85 m)	205 lb (93 kg)	Fr	Antwerp, Belgium

Head coach

- Anthony Grant (Dayton)

Assistant coach(es)

- Dan Hipsher (Bowling Green)
- John Brannen (Marshall)
- Tony Pujol (Sterling College)

Legend

- (C) Team captain
- (S) Suspended
- (I) Ineligible
- (W) Walk-on
- Injured
- Current redshirt

Source: Rolltide.com 2011–12 Roster

=== Depth chart ===
Pos.	Starting 5	Bench 1	Bench 2
C	JaMychal Green	Carl Engstrom	Moussa Gueye
PF	Nick Jacobs	Rodney Cooper
SF	Tony Mitchell	Charles Hankerson
SG	Levi Randolph	Trevor Lacey
PG	Trevor Releford	Ben Eblen	Retin Obasohan

=== Suspensions ===
Following the February 4 victory against Ole Miss, Tony Mitchell, the team's second leading scorer, was suspended indefinitely due to "conduct detrimental to the team." In the next game, Alabama went on the road to defeat Auburn by a record 18 points, but prior to that Saturday's game against LSU Grant suspended 3 more players for a "violation of team rules." This time it was the Crimson Tide's senior leading scorer JaMychal Green, starting PG Trevor Releford and Andrew Steele. With its top three leading scorers out and only one upperclassmen left on the bench, the shorthanded Crimson Tide fell to the LSU Tigers. Releford and Steele returned the following game to face the Florida Gators on February 14, but Green and Mitchell remained suspended. On February 20, Grant announced that Green was returning to practice and Mitchell would remain suspended for the duration of the season. Green did not play in the February 23 game against Arkansas. He finally saw game action again on February 25 at home against Mississippi State.

== Schedule and results ==
Date time, TV	Rank^{#}	Opponent^{#}	Result	Record	High points	High rebounds	High assists	Site (attendance) city, state
Exhibition
Nov. 7*; 7:00 p.m.	No. 19	Alabama-Huntsville	W 67–60		21 – Green	10 – Mitchell	4 – Mitchell	Coleman Coliseum (11,662); Tuscaloosa, AL
Non-conference regular season
Nov. 11*; 7:00 p.m.	No. 19	North Florida	W 64–44	1–0	18 – Green	10 – Mitchell	3 – Releford	Coleman Coliseum (11,754); Tuscaloosa, AL
Nov. 14*; 7:00 p.m.	No. 16	Oakland	W 74–57	2–0	18 – Green	9 – Mitchell	4 – Mitchell	Coleman Coliseum (9,876); Tuscaloosa, AL
Nov. 17*; 4:00 p.m., ESPN2	No. 16	vs. Maryland; Puerto Rico Tip-Off	W 62–42	3–0	17 – Mitchell	11 – Mitchell	3 – Lacey	Coliseo de Puerto Rico (5,322); San Juan, PR
Nov. 18*; 8:00 p.m., ESPN2	No. 16	vs. Wichita State; Puerto Rico Tip-Off	W 70–60	4–0	26 – Mitchell	12 – Green	4 – Releford	Coliseo de Puerto Rico (6,375); San Juan, PR
Nov. 20*; 6:30 p.m., ESPN2	No. 16	vs. Purdue; Puerto Rico Tip-Off	W 65–56	5–0	20 – Releford	10 – Mitchell	5 – Releford	Coliseo de Puerto Rico (11,297); San Juan, PR
Nov. 23*; 7:00 p.m.	No. 13	Alabama A&M	W 82–45	6–0	16 – Hankerson	10 – Jacobs	4 – Eblen	Coleman Coliseum (10,385); Tuscaloosa, AL
Nov. 27*; 8:30 p.m., ESPNU	No. 13	VCU	W 72–64	7–0	21 – Green	14 – Green	2 – Green	Coleman Coliseum (10,500); Tuscaloosa, AL
Dec. 1*; 8:30 p.m., ESPN2	No. 12	Georgetown; SEC–Big East Invitational	L 55–57	7–1	20 – Mitchell	11 – Mitchell	6 – Releford	Coleman Coliseum (15,383); Tuscaloosa, AL
Dec. 7*; 6:00 p.m.	No. 16	at Dayton	L 62–74	7–2	18 – Mitchell	4 – Mitchell	4 – Lacey	UD Arena (13,102); Dayton, Ohio
Dec. 11*; 5:00 p.m., ESPNU	No. 16	Detroit	W 62–54	8–2	21 – Green	8 – Mitchell	5 – Releford	Coleman Coliseum (10,011); Tuscaloosa, AL
Dec. 17*; 9:00 p.m., ESPNU	No. 23	vs. Kansas State	L 58–71	8–3	20 – Green	9 – Green	6 – Releford	Sprint Center (16,685); Kansas City, Missouri
Dec. 21*; 8:00 p.m., ESPN2		vs. Oklahoma State	W 69–52	9–3	19 – Releford	11 – Mitchell	5 – Randolph	BJCC (13,808); Birmingham, Alabama
Dec. 29*; 8:00 p.m., CSS		Jacksonville	W 72–55	10–3	18 – Releford	8 – Randolph	4 – Releford	Coleman Coliseum (12,527); Tuscaloosa, AL
Jan. 3*; 8:00 p.m., ESPNU		at Georgia Tech	W 73–48	11–3	17 – Releford	6 – Mitchell	5 – Lacey	Philips Arena (5,738); Atlanta
SEC Regular Season
Jan. 7; 6:00 p.m., FSN		at Georgia	W 74–59	12–3 (1–0)	19 – Lacey	10 – Green	5 – Green	Stegeman Coliseum (7,776); Athens, Georgia
Jan. 11; 8:00 p.m.		LSU	W 69–53	13–3 (2–0)	20 – Releford	10 – Mitchell	4 – Mitchell	Coleman Coliseum (14,245); Tuscaloosa, AL
Jan. 14; 3:00 p.m., SECN		at No. 20 Mississippi State	L 52–56	13–4 (2–1)	14 – Green	10 – Mitchell	3 – Green	Humphrey Coliseum (9,539); Starkville, Mississippi
Jan. 19; 6:00 p.m., ESPN		Vanderbilt	L 59–69	13–5 (2–2)	14 – Releford	8 – Green	4 – Mitchell	Coleman Coliseum (12,202); Tuscaloosa, AL
Jan. 21; 11:00 a.m., CBS		at No. 2 Kentucky	L 71–77	13–6 (2–3)	22 – Green	12 – Green	5 – Lacey	Rupp Arena (24,246); Lexington, Kentucky
Jan. 25; 7:00 p.m., SECN		at South Carolina	L 54–56	13–7 (2–4)	12 – Randolph	8 – Mitchell	3 – Releford	Colonial Life Arena (7,807); Columbia, South Carolina
Jan. 28; 12:30 p.m., SECN		Arkansas	W 72–66	14–7 (3–4)	18 – Releford	8 – Green	6 – Steele	Coleman Coliseum (13,145); Tuscaloosa, AL
Feb. 4; 7:00 p.m., ESPN2		Ole Miss	W 69–67 ^{2OT}	15–7 (4–4)	16 – Green	12 – Green	4 – Releford	Coleman Coliseum (12,711); Tuscaloosa, AL
Feb. 7; 8:00 p.m., ESPNU		at Auburn	W 68–50	16–7 (5–4)	19 – Green	7 – Green	6 – Steele	Auburn Arena (8,154); Auburn, AL
Feb. 11; 6:00 p.m., ESPN2		at LSU	L 58–67	16–8 (5–5)	28 – Cooper	5 – Randolph	3 – Eblen	Maravich Assembly Center (10,282); Baton Rouge, Louisiana
Feb. 14; 6:00 p.m., ESPN		No. 14 Florida	L 52–61	16–9 (5–6)	11 – Steele	9 – Randolph	3 – Steele	Coleman Coliseum (12,187); Tuscaloosa, AL
Feb. 18; 12:30 p.m., SECN		Tennessee	W 61–52	17–9 (6–6)	18 – Lacey	7 – Engstrom	7 – Steele	Coleman Coliseum (12,988); Tuscaloosa, AL
Feb. 23; 6:00 p.m., ESPN		at Arkansas	W 79–68	18–9 (7–6)	17 – Cooper	6 – Steele	3 – Randolph	Bud Walton Arena (12,320); Fayetteville, Arkansas
Feb. 25; 5:00 p.m., ESPN		Mississippi State	W 67–50	19–9 (8–6)	18 – Randolph	7 – Randolph	4 – (2 tied)	Coleman Coliseum (13,774); Tuscaloosa, AL
Feb. 29; 7:00 p.m., SECN		Auburn	W 55–49	20–9 (9–6)	15 – Green	10 – Green	– Randolph	Coleman Coliseum (14,253); Tuscaloosa, AL
Mar. 3; 3:00 p.m., SECN		at Ole Miss	L 51–60	20–10 (9–7)	12 – Releford	13 – Green	7 – Steele	Tad Smith Coliseum (6,339); Oxford, Mississippi
2012 SEC tournament
Mar. 8; 2:30 p.m., SECN	(5)	vs. (12) South Carolina; First round	W 63–57	21–10	15 – Lacey	7 – Green	3 – Steele	New Orleans Arena (10,703); New Orleans
Mar. 9; 2:30 p.m., SECN	(5)	vs. (4) #22 Florida; Quarterfinals	L 63–66	21–11	22 – Green	10 – Green	4 – Green	New Orleans Arena (18,207); New Orleans
2012 NCAA tournament
Mar. 16; 2:40 p.m., TBS	No. (MW 9)	vs. No. 19 (MW 8) Creighton; Midwest Region Second Round	L 57–58	21–12	14 – Releford	6 – Green	4 – Releford	Greensboro Coliseum (15,880); Greensboro, North Carolina
*Non-Conference Game. Rankings from AP poll. All times are in Central Time. (#) Number seeded with region.

Source: 2011–12 Schedule. Rolltide.com

== Rankings ==
Ranking movement Legend: ██ Increase in ranking. ██ Decrease in ranking.
Poll	Pre	Wk 1	Wk 2	Wk 3	Wk 4	Wk 5	Wk 6	Wk 7	Wk 8	Wk 9	Wk 10	Wk 11	Wk 12	Wk 13	Wk 14	Wk 15	Wk 16	Wk 17	Wk 18	Final
AP	19	16	13	12	16	23	NR	NR	NR	NR	NR	NR	NR	NR	NR					
Coaches	17	15	13	12	15	21	NR	NR	NR	NR	NR	NR	NR	NR	NR					

== See also ==
- Iron Bowl of Basketball
- 2012 NCAA Division I men's basketball tournament
- 2011–12 NCAA Division I men's basketball season
- 2011–12 NCAA Division I men's basketball rankings
