= 2010–11 Alabama Crimson Tide men's basketball team =

American college basketball season

2010–11 Alabama Crimson Tide men's basketball

SEC Western Division champions

NIT, runner-up
- Conference: Southeastern Conference
- West Division
- Record: 25–12 (12–4 SEC)
- Head coach: Anthony Grant (2nd season)
- Assistant coaches: Dan Hipsher (2nd season); John Brannen (2nd season); Tony Pujol (1st season)
- Home arena: Coleman Coliseum (Capacity: 15,316)

2010–11 Southeastern Conference men's basketball standings
| | Conf. | | | | Overall |
| Team | W | | L | PCT | W | | L | PCT |
|---|---|---|---|---|---|---|---|---|
East
| No. 15 Florida | 13 | – | 3 | .813 | 29 | – | 8 | .784 |
| No. 11 Kentucky † | 10 | – | 6 | .625 | 29 | – | 9 | .763 |
| No. 25 Vanderbilt | 9 | – | 7 | .563 | 23 | – | 11 | .676 |
| Georgia | 9 | – | 7 | .563 | 21 | – | 12 | .636 |
| Tennessee | 8 | – | 8 | .500 | 19 | – | 15 | .559 |
| South Carolina | 5 | – | 11 | .313 | 14 | – | 16 | .467 |
West
| Alabama | 12 | – | 4 | .750 | 25 | – | 12 | .676 |
| Mississippi State | 9 | – | 7 | .563 | 17 | – | 14 | .548 |
| Ole Miss | 7 | – | 9 | .438 | 20 | – | 14 | .588 |
| Arkansas | 7 | – | 9 | .438 | 18 | – | 13 | .581 |
| Auburn | 4 | – | 12 | .250 | 11 | – | 20 | .355 |
| LSU | 3 | – | 13 | .188 | 11 | – | 21 | .344 |
† 2011 SEC tournament winner As of April 2, 2011; Rankings from AP Poll

The 2010–11 Alabama Crimson Tide men's basketball team (variously "Alabama", "UA", "Bama" or "The Tide") represented the University of Alabama in the 2010–2011 college basketball season. The team's head coach was Anthony Grant, who entered his second season after posting a 17–15 record in his inaugural season. The team played its home games at Coleman Coliseum in Tuscaloosa, Alabama and was a member of the Southeastern Conference. This was the 98th season of basketball in the school's history.

== Pre-season ==
The 2009–10 season, the 1st under head coach Anthony Grant, saw the Tide finish the season 17–15 (6–10 SEC), while losing two key players to injury. The Crimson Tide had four players graduate and one transfer after the season ended, including the starting point guard. They also brought in four key freshman recruits and 1 junior college transfer. JaMychal Green was selected to the SEC Pre-season 2nd team, while the team was picked to finish 3rd in the western division of the SEC.

== Roster ==
2010–11 Alabama Crimson Tide men's basketball team
Players
Coaches

| Pos. | # | Name | Height | Weight | Year | Hometown |
|---|---|---|---|---|---|---|
| F | 1 | JaMychal Green | 6 ft 9 in (2.06 m) | 225 lb (102 kg) | Jr | Montgomery, Alabama |
| G | 2 | Charles Hankerson | 6 ft 5 in (1.96 m) | 210 lb (95 kg) | Fr | Miami, Florida |
| C | 4 | Carl Engström | 7 ft 1 in (2.16 m) | 250 lb (113 kg) | Fr | Ystad, Sweden |
| F | 5 | Tony Mitchell | 6 ft 6 in (1.98 m) | 210 lb (95 kg) | So | Swainsboro, Georgia |
| G | 10 | Ben Eblen | 6 ft 1 in (1.85 m) | 180 lb (82 kg) | So | Isle of Palms, South Carolina |
| F | 11 | Jason Carter | 6 ft 8 in (2.03 m) | 230 lb (104 kg) | Fr | Houston, Texas |
| G | 12 | Trevor Releford | 5 ft 10 in (1.78 m) | 170 lb (77 kg) | Fr | Shawnee Mission, Kansas |
| G | 14 | Kendall Durant (injured) | 6 ft 3 in (1.91 m) | 185 lb (84 kg) | Jr | Washington, D.C. |
| G | 21 | Senario Hillman | 6 ft 1 in (1.85 m) | 190 lb (86 kg) | Sr | Irwinton, Georgia |
| G | 22 | Andrew Steele | 6 ft 3 in (1.91 m) | 190 lb (86 kg) | RS So | Birmingham, Alabama |
| G | 24 | Charvez Davis | 6 ft 3 in (1.91 m) | 190 lb (86 kg) | Sr | Montgomery, Alabama |
| F | 44 | Chris Hines | 6 ft 8 in (2.03 m) | 220 lb (100 kg) | Sr | Evergreen, Alabama |
| F | 50 | Justin Luquire | 6 ft 7 in (2.01 m) | 225 lb (102 kg) | Sr | Indian Springs, Alabama |

Head coach

- Anthony Grant (Dayton)

Assistant coach(es)

- Dan Hipsher (Bowling Green)
- John Brannen (Marshall)
- Tony Pujol (Sterling College)

Legend

- (C) Team captain
- (S) Suspended
- (I) Ineligible
- (W) Walk-on
- Injured
- Current redshirt

Source: Rolltide.com 2010–11 Roster

=== Depth chart ===
| Pos. | Starting 5 | Bench 1 | Bench 2 |
|---|---|---|---|
| C | Chris Hines | Carl Engstrom | Justin Luquire |
| PF | JaMychal Green | Charles Hankerson |
| SF | Tony Mitchell | Andrew Steele | Jason Carter |
| SG | Charvez Davis | Senario Hillman | Kendall Durant |
| PG | Trevor Releford | Ben Eblen |

== Schedule and results ==
| Date time, TV | Rank^{#} | Opponent^{#} | Result | Record | High points | High rebounds | High assists | Site (attendance) city, state |
Exhibition
| November 2, 2010*; 7:00 pm | | Talladega | W 96–60 | — | 17 – T. Releford | 8 – T. Mitchell | 7 – T. Releford | Coleman Coliseum (8,958); Tuscaloosa, AL |
| November 8, 2010*; 7:00 pm | | Alabama–Huntsville | W 73–68 ^{2OT} | — | 22 – T. Releford | 8 – J. Green | 5 – S. Hillman | Coleman Coliseum (9,645); Tuscaloosa, AL |
Regular season
| November 12, 2010*; 7:30 pm | | Florida A&M | W 76–37 | 1–0 | 14 – J. Green | 9 – T. Mitchell | 5 – S. Hillman | Coleman Coliseum (10,313); Tuscaloosa, AL |
| November 15, 2010*; 7:00 pm | | Troy | W 79–60 | 2–0 | 17 – J. Green | 7 – J. Green | 6 – T. Releford | Coleman Coliseum (8,939); Tuscaloosa, AL |
| November 19, 2010*; 5:00 pm | | vs. Seton Hall; Paradise Jam | L 78–83 | 2–1 | 20 – T. Releford | 11 – C. Hines | 3 – C. Hines | Sports and Fitness Center; St. Thomas, VI |
| November 20, 2010*; 5:00 pm | | vs. Iowa; Paradise Jam | L 47–55 | 2–2 | 17 – J. Green | 8 – T. Releford | 3 – T. Mitchell | Sports and Fitness Center; St. Thomas, VI |
| November 22, 2010*; 12:00 pm | | vs. Saint Peter's; Paradise Jam | L 49–50 | 2–3 | 15 – T. Mitchell | 6 – T. Mitchell | 3 – S. Hillman | Sports and Fitness Center; St. Thomas, VI |
| November 27, 2010*; 1:00 pm | | Alabama A&M | W 76–50 | 3–3 | 15 – S. Hillmam | 15 – T. Mitchell | 7 – T. Releford | Coleman Coliseum (10,746); Tuscaloosa, AL |
| December 1, 2010*; 7:30 pm, no | | South Alabama | W 72–50 | 4–3 | 20 – T. Mitchell | 13 – T. Mitchell | 4 – T. Releford | Coleman Coliseum (9,553); Tuscaloosa, AL |
| December 4, 2010*; 2:30 pm | | at No. 22 Purdue | L 47–66 | 4–4 | 14 – T. Mitchell | 9 – T. Mitchell | 3 – S. Hillman | Mackey Arena (14,123); West Lafayette, IN |
| December 11, 2010*; 1:00 pm | | at Providence | L 70–82 | 4–5 | 20 – T. Mitchell | 11 – J. Green | 6 – T. Releford | Dunkin' Donuts Center (8,056); Providence, RI |
| December 15, 2010*; 8:00 pm | | Southeastern Louisiana | W 59–38 | 5–5 | 16 – J. Green | 15 – J. Green | 3 – J. Green | Coleman Coliseum (8,178); Tuscaloosa, AL |
| December 18, 2010*; 5:30 pm | | vs. Oklahoma State; All-College Basketball Classic | L 60–68 | 5–6 | 16 – J. Green | 8 – C. Hines | 4 – T. Releford | Oklahoma City Arena (10,625); Oklahoma City, OK |
| December 21, 2010*; 7:00 pm | | Lipscomb | W 71–51 | 6–6 | 22 – C. Davis | 10 – C. Hines | 5 – T. Releford | Coleman Coliseum (8,889); Tuscaloosa, AL |
| December 28, 2010*; 8:00 pm | | Pepperdine | W 83–60 | 7–6 | 23 – J. Green | 11 – C. Hines | 6 – T. Releford | Coleman Coliseum (9,139); Tuscaloosa, AL |
| January 3, 2011*; 7:00 pm | | Toledo | W 83–41 | 8–6 | 21 – C. Davis | 8 – T. Mitchell | 5 – S. Hillman | Coleman Coliseum (8,245); Tuscaloosa, AL |
| January 8, 2011; 3:00 pm | | at Mississippi State | W 75–57 | 9–6 (1–0) | 17 – T. Releford | 11 – J. Green | 4 – T. Releford | Humphrey Coliseum (7,121); Starkville, MS |
| January 12, 2011; 8:00 pm | | South Carolina | W 57–47 | 10–6 (2–0) | 20 – J. Green | 11 – T. Mitchell | 2 – S Hillman | Coleman Coliseum (11,572); Tuscaloosa, AL |
| January 15, 2011; 12:30 pm | | at Arkansas | L 65–70 | 10–7 (2–1) | 17 – T. Releford | 12 – C. Hines | 4 – T. Releford | Bud Walton Arena (13,033); Fayetteville, AR |
| January 18, 2011; 8:00 pm | | No. 12 Kentucky | W 68–66 | 11–7 (3–1) | 18 – J. Green | 11 – J. Green | 3 – C. Hines | Coleman Coliseum (14,859); Tuscaloosa, AL |
| January 22, 2011; 5:00 pm | | at Auburn; Rivalry | W 68–58 | 12–7 (4–1) | 15 – J. Green | 6 – T. Mitchell | 5 – S. Hillman | Auburn Arena (9,121); Auburn, AL |
| January 29, 2011; 7:00 pm | | LSU | W 70–46 | 13–7 (5–1) | 20 – J. Green | 7 – J. Green | 4 – T. Releford | Coleman Coliseum (15,383); Tuscaloosa, AL |
| February 2, 2011; 7:00 pm | | Mississippi State | W 75–61 | 14–7 (6–1) | 23 – T. Mitchell | 11 – J. Green | 8 – T. Releford | Coleman Coliseum (10,771); Tuscaloosa, AL |
| February 5, 2011; 4:00 pm | | at Tennessee | W 65–60 ^{OT} | 15–7 (7–1) | 24 – T. Mitchell | 8 – C. Hines | 3 – J. Green | Thompson–Boling Arena (21,948); Knoxville, TN |
| February 10, 2011; 8:00 pm | | at No. 23 Vanderbilt | L 77–81 | 15–8 (7–2) | 23 – J. Green | 10 – J. Green | 4 – S. Hillman | Memorial Gymnasium (14,136); Nashville, TN |
| February 12, 2011; 3:00 pm | | Ole Miss | W 74–64 | 16–8 (8–2) | 20 – T. Mitchell | 7 – T. Mitchell | 7 – T. Releford | Coleman Coliseum (15,383); Tuscaloosa, AL |
| February 17, 2011; 8:00 pm | | at LSU | W 67–56 | 17–8 (9–2) | 18 – J. Green | 8 – J. Green | 2 – T. Releford | Maravich Assembly Center (7,830); Baton Rouge, LA |
| February 19, 2011; 6:00 pm | | Arkansas | W 69–56 | 18–8 (10–2) | 27 – T. Mitchell | 9 – J. Green | 4 – T. Releford | Coleman Coliseum (15,383); Tuscaloosa, AL |
| February 23, 2011; 7:00 pm | | Auburn; Rivalry | W 51–49 | 19–8 (11–2) | 17 – J. Green | 9 – C. Hines | 1 – C. Davis | Coleman Coliseum (15,383); Tuscaloosa, AL |
| February 26, 2011; 3:00 pm | | at Ole Miss | L 63–68 | 19–9 (11–3) | 17 – J. Green | 7 – C. Hines | 6 – C. Davis | Tad Smith Coliseum (7,903); Oxford, MS |
| March 1, 2011; 6:00 pm | | at No. 14 Florida | L 51–78 | 19–10 (11–4) | 17 – T. Releford | 9 – J. Green | 4 – T. Releford | O'Connell Center (12,225); Gainesville, FL |
| March 5, 2011; 12:30 pm | | Georgia | W 65–57 | 20–10 (12–4) | 19 – J. Green | 11 – T. Mitchell | 4 – C. Davis | Coleman Coliseum (15,383); Tuscaloosa, AL |
SEC tournament
| March 11, 2011; 12:00 pm | (W1) | vs. (E4) Georgia; SEC Quarterfinals | W 65–59 ^{OT} | 21–10 | 20 – J. Green | 13 – J. Green | 2 – T. Releford | Georgia Dome (21,875); Atlanta, GA |
| March 12, 2011; 12:00 pm | (W1) | vs. (E2) No. 15 Kentucky; SEC Semifinals | L 58–72 | 21–11 | 16 – T. Mitchell | 9 – J. Green | 4 – T. Releford | Georgia Dome (21,728); Atlanta, GA |
NIT
| March 15, 2011*; 6:00 pm | (1 A) | (8 A) Coastal Carolina; NIT First Round | W 68–44 | 22–11 | 12 – 3 tied | 10 – J. Green | 4 – C. Davis | Coleman Coliseum (5,116); Tuscaloosa, AL |
| March 21, 2011*; 8:00 pm | (1 A) | (4 A) New Mexico; NIT Second Round | W 74–67 | 23–11 | 23 – T. Mitchell | 7 – J. Green | 6 – T. Releford | Coleman Coliseum (6,821); Tuscaloosa, AL |
| March 23, 2011*; 8:00 pm | (1 A) | (2 A) Miami (FL); NIT Quarterfinals | W 79–64 | 24–11 | 22 – T. Releford | 9 – 3 tied | 3 – C. Davis | Coleman Coliseum (8,612); Tuscaloosa, AL |
| March 29, 2011*; 8:00 pm | (1 A) | vs. (1 C) Colorado; NIT Semifinals | W 62–61 | 25–11 | 22 – J. Green | 6 – 2 tied | 7 – T. Releford | Madison Square Garden (6,082); New York, NY |
| March 31, 2011*; 6:00 pm | (1 A) | vs. (4 VT) Wichita State; NIT Championship Game | L 57–66 | 25–12 | 13 – T. Mitchell | 10 – T. Mitchell | 3 – T. Releford | Madison Square Garden (6,206); New York, NY |
*Non-conference game. ^{#}Rankings from AP Poll. (#) Tournament seedings in parentheses. A=NIT Alabama bracket. C=NIT Colorado bracket. VT=NIT Virginia Tech bracket. All times are in Central Time.

Source: 2010–11 Schedule. Rolltide.com

== Class of 2011 signees ==
College recruiting information
| Name | Hometown | School | Height | Weight | Commit date |
|---|---|---|---|---|---|
| Trevor Lacey; G | Huntsville, Alabama | S.R. Butler HS | 6 ft 3 in (1.91 m) | 190 lb (86 kg) | May 18, 2011 |
| Trevor Lacey; G | Recruit ratings: Scout: Rivals: (96) | | | | |
| Levi Randolph; G | Madison, Alabama | Bob Jones HS | 6 ft 4 in (1.93 m) | 180 lb (82 kg) | May 20, 2010 |
| Levi Randolph; G | Recruit ratings: Scout: Rivals: (96) | | | | |
| Nick Jacobs; F | Atlanta, Georgia | South Atlanta HS | 6 ft 8 in (2.03 m) | 255 lb (116 kg) | Oct 26, 2010 |
| Nick Jacobs; F | Recruit ratings: Scout: Rivals: (92) | | | | |
| Rodney Cooper; F | Seale, Alabama | Russell County HS | 6 ft 5 in (1.96 m) | 200 lb (91 kg) | May 20, 2010 |
| Rodney Cooper; F | Recruit ratings: Scout: Rivals: (91) | | | | |
| Moussa Gueye; C | Mattoon, Illinois | Lake Land CC | 7 ft 0 in (2.13 m) | 225 lb (102 kg) | Oct 4, 2010 |
| Moussa Gueye; C | Recruit ratings: Scout: Rivals: (88) | | | | |
| Retin Obasohan; G | Antwerp, Belgium | | 6 ft 1 in (1.85 m) | 205 lb (93 kg) | May 20, 2011 |
| Retin Obasohan; G | Recruit ratings: Scout: Rivals: (N/A) | | | | |
Overall recruit ranking: Scout: 14 Rivals: 5 ESPN: 13
Note: In many cases, Scout, Rivals, 247Sports, On3, and ESPN may conflict in their listings of height and weight.; In these cases, the average was taken. ESPN grades are on a 100-point scale.; Sources: "Alabama Basketball Commitments". Rivals.; "2011 Alabama Basketball Commits". Scout.; "ESPN". ESPN.; "Scout.com Team Recruiting Rankings". Scout.; "2011 Team Ranking". Rivals.

== See also ==
- Iron Bowl of Basketball
- 2011 NCAA Men's Division I Basketball Tournament
- 2010–11 NCAA Division I men's basketball season
- 2010–11 NCAA Division I men's basketball rankings
