= Flaget High School =

Coordinates: 38.25620°N 85.82500°W

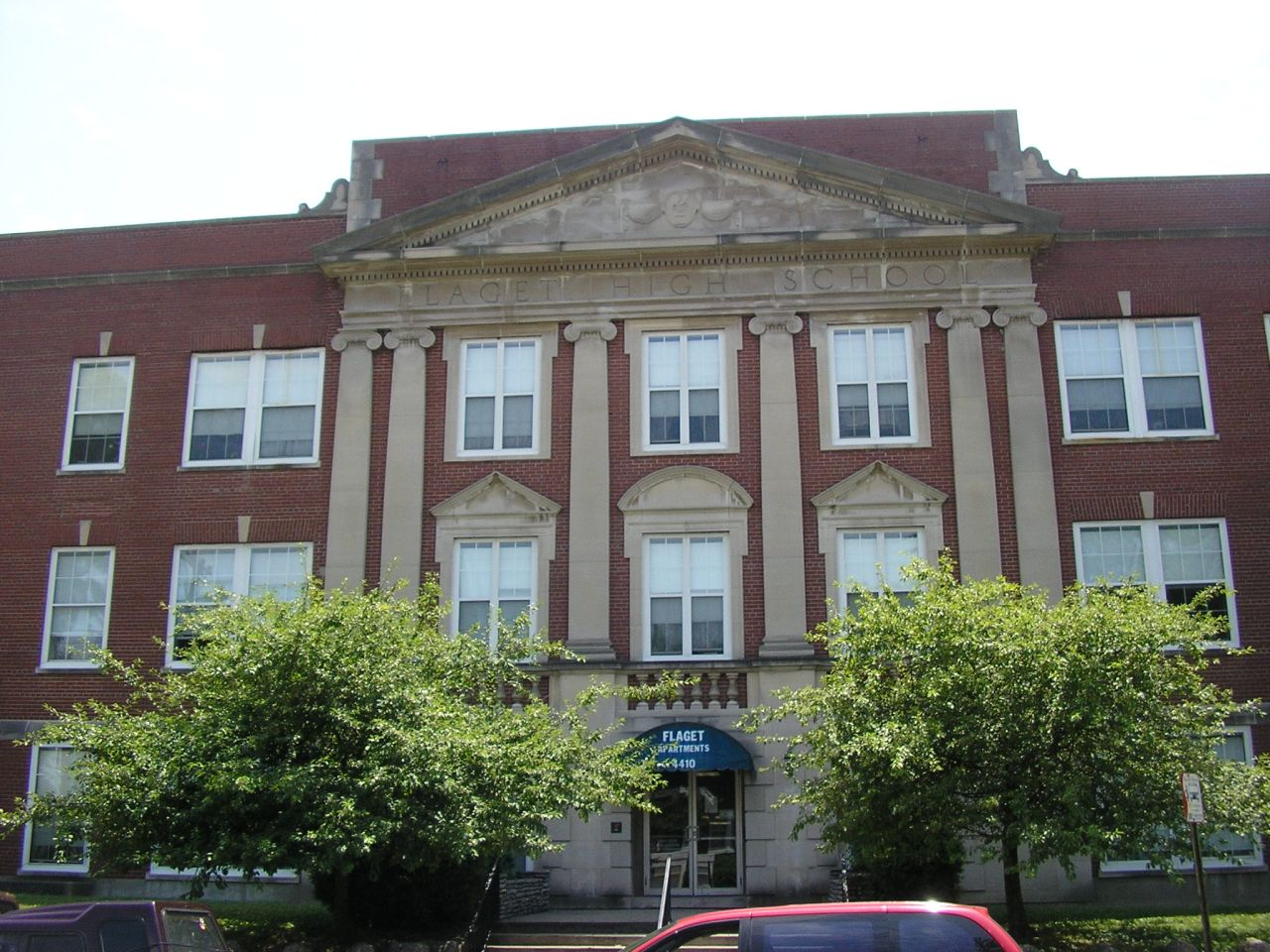
- Flaget High School building after conversion to apartments
- Louisville, Kentucky; United States

Information
- Type: Private
- Established: 1942
- Closed: 1974
- Grades: 9-12
- Campus type: Urban
- Colours: Blue and White
- Mascot: Braves
- Affiliation: Roman Catholic
- Website: https://www.flaget.org/

Flaget High School was a Catholic College preparatory high school in Louisville, Kentucky's West End from 1942 until 1974. It was located throughout its existence at 44th and River Park Drive, in the Shawnee neighborhood of Louisville.

== History ==
Louisville archbishop John A. Floersh began raising funds for the school in 1941, and a year later purchased the former home of John Henry Whallen at 44th and River Park Drive. The school was named for Benedict Joseph Flaget, the first Bishop of Kentucky.

The classes were taught by Xaverian Brothers who also taught at St. Xavier High School. A dedicated school building was built in 1946 and expanded in 1947 after the razing of the Whallen house. Enrollment passed 1,000 in the 1949–50 school year. Flaget offered students in the predominantly blue-collar West End a chance to attend a college prep high school instead of a vocational school. Many graduates of Flaget would become the first members of their families to attend college. The school produced several notable members of the community, including Citizens Fidelity Bank president Daniel Ulmer, Rohm and Haas president Daniel Ash and University of Louisville trustee George Fischer.→

By the 1970s, the school was a victim of changing times, as white flight had seen what was once an all-white neighborhood become integrated and most Catholic families left for the city's southern and eastern suburbs. Flaget won its last championship in any sport, a tie for the state football title, in 1971.

The school became coeducational in its final year, absorbing female students from the recently closed Loretto High School. There were 65 students in the final graduating class. Over 4,200 students graduated from Flaget over the years.

The building was converted in 1982 to an apartment home for the elderly. In 2002 a museum containing Flaget photos and memorabilia was dedicated in the Alumni Building of Trinity High School.

== Athletics ==
Flaget High was known for its athletics, winning its first championship, a city golf championship, in 1945. It would also win state championships in basketball in 1960 and track in 1961. It won the Southern Interscholastic Championship in cross country in 1963. However, Flaget became best known for its football program, which compiled a 196–79–17 record from 1945 to 1973 Paulie Miller was hired in 1945 as the coach of various sports teams, but became famous as the coach of the football team, establishing St. X as their rivals and winning their first state championship in 1949. Miller coached at Flaget until 1963. The team won state championships again in 1952, 1958, 1961 (41–13 over Fairdale High School), and in 1967 under Norm Mackin (21–7 vs. Thomas Jefferson High School) and 1971 under Pete "The Computer" Compise (a 6–6 tie with Thomas Jefferson) after Miller had stepped down.

== Notable alumni ==
- Gus Bell (1928–1995), Major League Baseball (MLB) outfielder from 1950 to 1964.
- Larry Clark (born 1945), member of the Kentucky House of Representatives, representing the 46th District since 1984.
- Darryl Drake (1956–2019), college football coach and wide receivers coach for the Arizona Cardinals.
- Jerry Harper (1934–2001), professional basketball player
- Paul Hornung (1935–2020), All-Pro National Football League (NFL) halfback and placekicker for the Green Bay Packers who won the 1956 Heisman Trophy and was inducted into the Pro Football Hall of Fame in 1986.
- Dick Leitsch (1935–2018), LGBT rights activist, who was president of gay rights group the Mattachine Society in the 1960s.
- Howard Schnellenberger (1934–2021), college and professional football coach.

== Sources ==
- David N. Aspy and Paulie Miller (1991). Burning Desire: A History of Flaget High School, 1942–1974.
