= Darryl Drake =

American football player and coach (1956–2019)

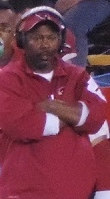
- Drake in 2014

Personal information
- Born: December 11, 1956; Louisville, Kentucky, U.S.
- Died: August 11, 2019 (aged 62); Latrobe, Pennsylvania, U.S.
- Listed height: 5 ft 8 in (1.73 m)

Career information
- High school: Louisville (KY) Flaget
- College: Western Kentucky
- NFL draft: 1979: undrafted

Career history

Playing
- Washington Redskins (1979)*; Ottawa Rough Riders (1981)*; Cincinnati Bengals (1983)*
- * Offseason or practice squad member only

Coaching
- Western Kentucky (1983–1984) Graduate assistant; Western Kentucky (1985–1988) Wide receivers coach; Western Kentucky (1989–1990) Defensive backs coach; Western Kentucky (1991) Quarterbacks coach; Georgia (1992–1996) Wide receivers coach; Baylor (1997) Offensive coordinator & quarterbacks coach; Texas (1998–2002) Wide receivers coach; Texas (2003) Associate head coach & wide receivers coach; Chicago Bears (2004–2012) Wide receivers coach; Arizona Cardinals (2013–2017) Wide receivers coach; Pittsburgh Steelers (2018–2019) Wide receivers coach

Darryl Drake (December 11, 1956 – August 11, 2019) was an American football player and coach. His career spanned four decades, including stints as the wide receivers coach of the Chicago Bears, Arizona Cardinals, and Pittsburgh Steelers of the National Football League (NFL).

== College career ==
Drake played wide receiver for Western Kentucky University from 1975 to 1978. In 2023, he was inducted into the Western Kentucky University Athletic Hall of Fame.

== Professional career ==
Drake played wide receiver for three professional teams, the Washington Redskins in 1979, the Ottawa Rough Riders in 1981, and the Cincinnati Bengals in 1983.

== Coaching career ==
Drake coached at the collegiate level for 21 years. He joined the Chicago Bears coaching staff on February 6, 2004. On January 17, 2013, Drake was not retained by new head coach Marc Trestman. He later spent five seasons with the Arizona Cardinals before joining the Pittsburgh Steelers in 2018.

== Personal life ==
Drake and his wife, Sheila, had three daughters. He died on August 11, 2019, at the age of 62. The official cause of death has not been made public, although it's been reported that Drake experienced chest pains and declined an overnight hospital stay in the days before he died.
