= Jack Kubiszyn =

American baseball player (born 1936)

- Shortstop / Third baseman
- Born: December 19, 1936 (age 89); Buffalo, New York, U.S.
- Batted: Right Threw: Right

MLB debut
- April 23, 1961, for the Cleveland Indians

Last MLB appearance
- September 30, 1962, for the Cleveland Indians

MLB statistics
- Batting average: .188
- Home runs: 1
- Runs batted in: 2
- Stats at Baseball Reference

Teams
- Cleveland Indians (1961–1962)

John Henry Kubiszyn (born December 19, 1936) is an American former professional baseball player. A shortstop, he appeared in the Major Leagues for parts of two seasons for the Cleveland Indians (1961–1962), playing in 25 games both seasons. The Buffalo, New York, native threw and batted right-handed, stood 5 feet 11 inches (1.80 m) tall and weighed 170 pounds (77 kg).

Kubiszyn was a two-sport star at the University of Alabama in the 1950s. A three-year basketball guard from 1956 to 1958, he was a member of Johnny Dee's famed "Rocket 8" teams. During his junior season in 1957, Kubiszyn averaged 24.6 points per game, a school record that still stands today. In 1958, he was named All-American. Kubiszyn's three-year Crimson Tide baseball career at shortstop spanned the 1956–1958 seasons. Playing for coach Tilden Campbell, he finished with a .300 batting average.

His professional baseball career extended from 1958 to 1964. During his two trials with the Indians, he collected 19 hits, with two doubles, in 101 at bats. Highlights included a three-hit game in four at bats against the Minnesota Twins' Camilo Pascual on September 17, 1961, and his only Major-League home run, hit off Bill Fischer of the Kansas City Athletics on August 3, 1962 — the winning blow in a 1–0 Cleveland victory.

Jack Kubiszyn settled in Tuscaloosa, Alabama, after leaving baseball, where he founded an insurance agency and served on the city council during the 1990s.
