= John Dee (basketball) =

American basketball coach (1923–1999)

John Francis Dee, Jr. (September 12, 1923 – April 24, 1999) was head basketball coach at the University of Alabama from 1953 to 1956 and the University of Notre Dame from 1964 to 1971.

== Alabama Crimson Tide ==
Dee had a coaching record of 68–25 in his time at Alabama. In 1956, the Crimson Tide stunned Adolph Rupp's Kentucky Wildcats with a 101–77 win with a team nicknamed the "Rocket 8". Jerry Harper was Dee's best player during his tenure at Alabama. The 1955–1956 team finished 21–3 overall and 14–0 in the SEC and attained the Tide's highest ranking up to that point at #4. However, due to all five starters having played as freshmen, they were all ruled as ineligible and the team was banned from participating in the 1956 NCAA basketball tournament. The team would subsequently not become eligible for the NCAA tournament again until 1975, when the NCAA began allowing two teams from each conference in the tournament

== NIBL ==
Dee Coached the Denver-Chicago Truckers of the AAU National Industrial Basketball League from 1956 to 1961.

== Notre Dame ==
During Dee's seven seasons at the helm of Notre Dame Basketball (1964–1971), he compiled a record of 116 wins and 80 losses. Dee led the Fighting Irish to four NCAA tournament appearances and one berth in the National Invitation Tournament. Dee culminated his coaching career at Notre Dame with four straight 20-win seasons, at the time the longest such streak in school history.

== Personal ==
Dee was also an attorney who, following his career coaching at Notre Dame returned to his practice in Denver where he concentrated in Oil and Gas transactions.
