= Terry Coner =

American basketball player (born 1964)

Personal information
- Born: November 7, 1964 (age 62) Birmingham, Alabama, U.S.
- Listed height: 6 ft 3 in (1.91 m)
- Listed weight: 170 lb (77 kg)

Career information
- High school: Phillips (Birmingham, Alabama)
- College: Alabama (1983–1987)
- NBA draft: 1987: 2nd round, 44th overall pick
- Drafted by: Atlanta Hawks
- Playing career: 1987–1998
- Position: Point guard
- Coaching career: 2015–present

Career history

Playing
- 1987–1988: Savannah Spirits
- 1988–1989: DAS Delft
- 1990: Olimpo
- 1990–1991: Pensacola Tornados
- 1991: Gimnasia y Esgrima (CR)
- 1991–1992: Olimpo
- 1992–1993: Estudiantes de Bahía Blanca
- 1995–1996: BC Kalev
- 1996–1997: Rotterdam Basketbal
- 1997–1998: ABC Amsterdam

Coaching
- 2015–2019: Altamont School
- 2020–present: Pinson Valley HS (assistant)

Career highlights
- DBL season assists leader (1989); First-team All-SEC – AP (1987); Alabama Mr. Basketball (1983)
- Stats at Basketball Reference

Terry Bernard Coner (born November 7, 1964) is an American basketball coach and former professional player. He was named Alabama Mr. Basketball while attending Phillips High School in Birmingham, Alabama. Coner played college basketball for the Alabama Crimson Tide for four seasons. At the conclusion of his collegiate career, it was determined he had been collegiately ineligible due to making contact with an agent while still enrolled.

Coner was selected by the Atlanta Hawks as the 44th overall pick of the 1987 NBA draft. He spent his first professional season with the Savannah Spirits of the Continental Basketball Association. Coner then played professionally in Argentina and Europe.

Coner became the head coach of the boys' basketball team at Altamont School in 2015 after he had served as a long-time assistant. He became an assistant coach at Pinson Valley High School in 2020 where his son plays on the team.

== Career statistics ==
Legend
GP	Games played	GS	Games started	MPG	Minutes per game
FG%	Field goal percentage	3P%	3-point field goal percentage	FT%	Free throw percentage
RPG	Rebounds per game	APG	Assists per game	SPG	Steals per game
BPG	Blocks per game	PPG	Points per game	**Bold**	Career high

=== College ===
Year	Team	GP	GS	MPG	FG%	3P%	FT%	RPG	APG	SPG	BPG	PPG
1983–84	Alabama	28	8	18.3	.455	–	.789	.9	2.4	.5	.1	5.7
1984–85	Alabama	**33**	**33**	**36.2**	**.521**	–	.773	2.2	5.6	**2.2**	**.3**	**11.8**
1985–86	Alabama	32	32	35.6	.485	–	.716	**2.8**	**7.5**	1.7	**.3**	10.9
1986–87	Alabama	27	24	31.6	.505	**.000**	**.850**	2.7	6.4	1.3	.2	11.7
Career		120	97	30.9	.497	.000	.780	2.2	5.5	1.5	.2	10.1
