= Tony Mitchell (basketball, born 1989) =

American basketball player (born 1989)

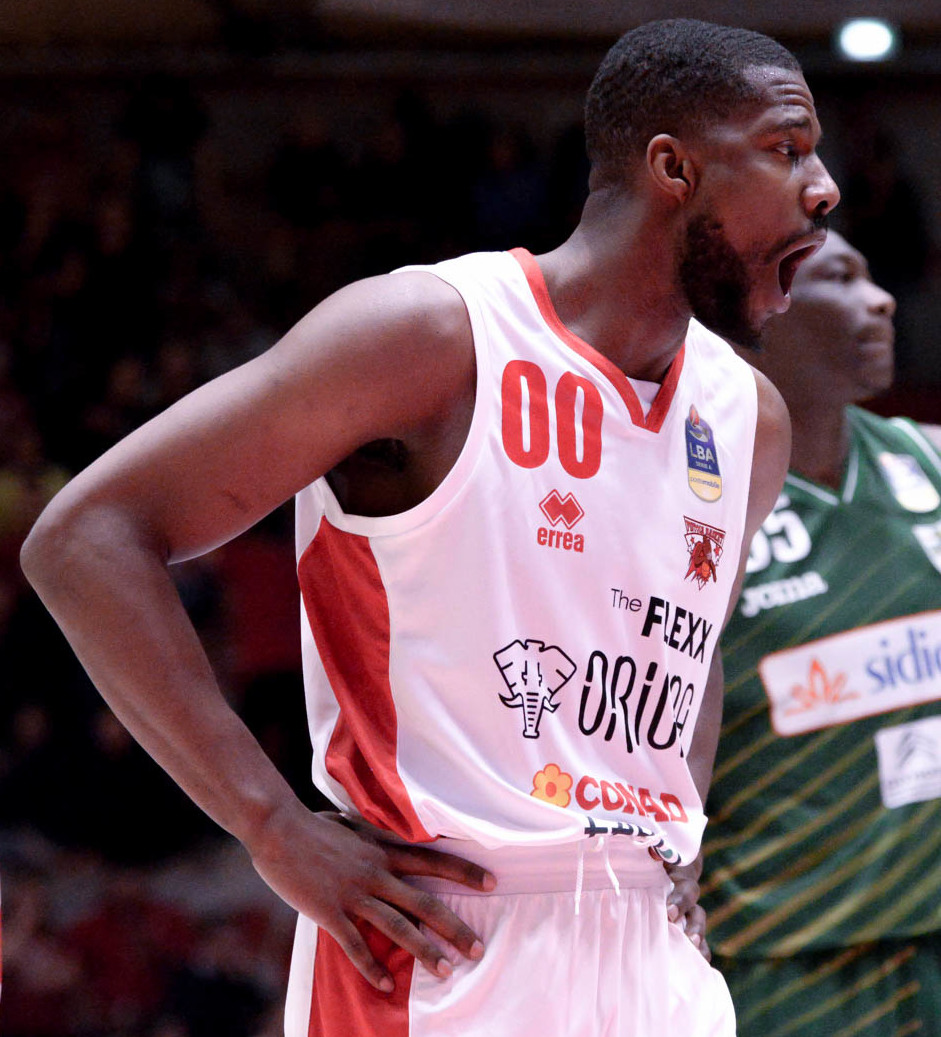
- Mitchell with OriOra Pistoia in 2019

No. 0 – Beirut Club
- Position: Small forward
- League: Lebanese Basketball League

Personal information
- Born: August 7, 1989 (age 37) Swainsboro, Georgia, U.S.
- Listed height: 6 ft 6 in (1.98 m)
- Listed weight: 215 lb (98 kg)

Career information
- High school: Swainsboro (Swainsboro, Georgia); Central Park Christian (Birmingham, Alabama)
- College: Alabama (2009–2012)
- NBA draft: 2012: undrafted
- Playing career: 2012–present

Career history
- 2012–2013: Fort Wayne Mad Ants
- 2013: Talk 'N Text Tropang Texters
- 2013: Jilin Northeast Tigers
- 2014: Fort Wayne Mad Ants
- 2014: Milwaukee Bucks
- 2014–2015: Dolomiti Energia Trento
- 2015: Krasny Oktyabr
- 2015: Estudiantes
- 2016: Dinamo Sassari
- 2016: Hebei Xianglan
- 2016: Hapoel Eilat
- 2017: Cairns Taipans
- 2017: Indios de Mayagüez
- 2017: Chongqing Sanhai Lanling
- 2017–2018: Sioux Falls Skyforce
- 2018: Santeros de Aguada
- 2018: Chongqing Sanhai Lanling
- 2018–2019: Cantù
- 2019: OriOra Pistoia
- 2019: Trotamundos de Carabobo
- 2019: Aguada
- 2020: AS Salé
- 2020–2021: Peñarol de Mar del Plata
- 2021–2022: TaiwanBeer HeroBears
- 2022: Soles de Santo Domingo Este
- 2022–2023: Al-Muharraq
- 2023: Al-Bahrain
- 2023: Beirut Club
- 2024: Al Ahly Benghazi
- 2024: Al Ahly
- 2024: Unión de Santa Fe
- 2024–2025: Al-Muharraq
- 2025–present: Beirut Club

Career highlights
- NBL Foreign MVP (2016); LBA Most Valuable Player (2015); LBA Top Scorer (2015); NBA D-League champion (2014); All-NBA D-League First Team (2013); All-NBA D-League Third Team (2014); NBA D-League Rookie of the Year (2013); NBA D-League All-Rookie First Team (2013); 2× NBA D-League Slam Dunk Contest champion (2013, 2014); Second-team All-SEC (2011); SEC All-Rookie team (2010)
- Stats at NBA.com
- Stats at Basketball Reference

Tony Rasean Mitchell Jr. (born August 7, 1989) is an American-born naturalized Libyan professional basketball player for Beirut Club of the Lebanese Basketball League. He played college basketball for the Alabama Crimson Tide. Mitchell received Libyan citizenship in 2023.

== High school career ==
As a junior at Swainsboro High School, Mitchell averaged 19 points, eight rebounds and five blocked shots. For his effort, he was named the 2007 Georgia Sports Writers Association Class AA Player of the Year and was voted all-state. He then transferred to Birmingham, AL prep powerhouse Central Park Christian for his senior year where he averaged 27 points, eight rebounds and five assists per game, whilst leading his team to a 2008 national title. Coming out of high school, Mitchell was rated as a four-star prospect and the #10 overall small forward by Scout.com and a four-star player and the #8 overall small forward by Rivals.com.

== College career ==
In June 2007, Mitchell committed to then head coach Mark Gottfried and the University of Alabama over the University of South Carolina and the University of Cincinnati. His enrollment with Alabama was delayed, however, due to academic issues and he was unable to join the team for the 2008–09 season. He instead played one season with Central Park Christian, a preparatory school in Birmingham, Alabama.

At Central Park, Mitchell led the team to a 25–0 record and a National Christian Education Basketball Tournament title. Despite Coach Gottfried being relieved of his duties at Alabama in January 2009, Mitchell maintained his commitment and joined the team and new coach Anthony Grant for the 2009–10 season.

As a freshman, Mitchell averaged over 23 minutes per game and made 18 starts for the (17–15) Crimson Tide. In just his second game, he scored 23 points on 10-14 shooting against Jackson State. On the season, he averaged 9.2 points and 5.9 rebounds and recorded three double-doubles including a 10-point, 12-rebound effort against Kentucky in the SEC Tournament. He was named as an SEC Freshman of the Week, Alabama's Most Outstanding Freshman and a member of the SEC All-Freshman Team.

In his sophomore season for the 2010–11 team, Mitchell led the team in scoring, rebounds, steals and minutes played. On February 21, he was named the SEC Player of the Week after he averaged 20 points and 6.5 rebounds in wins at LSU and over Arkansas. Against Arkansas, Mitchell scored a career-high 27 points on 11 of 15 shooting. He was second team All-SEC. After being suspended for conduct detrimental to the team, he was granted his release from the 2011–12 Alabama Crimson Tide men's basketball team.

== Professional career ==
After going undrafted in the 2012 NBA draft, Mitchell joined the Sacramento Kings for the 2012 NBA Summer League. In November 2012, he was acquired by the Fort Wayne Mad Ants. In March 2013, he won the 2013 D-League Dream Factory Dunk Contest. On April 16, 2013, he was named the 2013 NBA D-League Rookie of the Year. He was a two-time NBA D-League Performer of the Week and March's NBA D-League Co-Player of the Month.

In May 2013, he joined the Talk 'N Text Tropang Texters for the 2013 Commissioner's Cup.

In July 2013, he joined the Boston Celtics for the Orlando Summer League and the New York Knicks for the Las Vegas Summer League. In October 2013, he signed with the Jilin Northeast Tigers of China for the 2013–14 season. In December 2013, he left Jilin after 11 games. On January 8, 2014, he was re-acquired by the Fort Wayne Mad Ants.

On March 4, 2014, he signed a 10-day contract with the Milwaukee Bucks. On March 14, 2014, he was not offered a second 10-day contract by the Bucks. Two days later, he was re-acquired by the Mad Ants. He went on to help the Mad Ants win the 2014 NBA D-League championship.

In July 2014, he joined the NBA D-League Select Team for the 2014 NBA Summer League.

On August 18, 2014, he signed with Dolomiti Energia Trento of the Italian Serie A for the 2014–15 season. After leading the league in scoring with 20.1 points per game (adding 5.6 rebounds and 2.8 assists) over 34 games, he was named Serie A MVP.

On September 3, 2015, he joined Russian club Krasny Oktyabr to play in both the regional VTB United League and continental Eurocup. On November 3, 2015, he parted ways with Krasny Oktyabr after averaging 21.4 points per game. On November 23, 2015, he signed with the Spanish club Estudiantes for the rest of the 2015–16 ACB season. On December 28, 2015, he parted ways with Estudiantes after appearing in six games. On January 8, 2016, he signed with the Italian club Dinamo Sassari for the rest of the season. On May 2, 2016, he parted ways with Sassari. On May 31, 2016, he signed in China with the Hebei Xianglan for the 2016 NBL season.

On November 15, 2016, Mitchell signed with Israeli club Hapoel Eilat. He left Hapoel after appearing in five games.

On January 20, 2017, Mitchell signed with the Cairns Taipans for the rest of the 2016–17 NBL season. On February 24, 2017, Mitchell was banned for the entire 2017–18 NBL season for throwing the ball at a referee after the Taipans' semi-final loss to the Perth Wildcats four days earlier.

On May 29, 2017, Mitchell signed with the Indios de Mayagüez of Puerto Rico for the rest of the 2017 BSN season.

On October 12, 2017, Mitchell signed a training camp contract with the Miami Heat. He was waived on October 14 as one of the team's final preseason roster cuts. Nine days later, he was acquired by the Sioux Falls Skyforce of the NBA G League.

On April 18, 2018, Mitchell signed with Santeros de Aguada of the Baloncesto Superior Nacional. However, he was released on May 18 after 10 games.

On August 20, 2018, Mitchell came back to Italy and signed a deal with Cantù of the LBA.

On February 28, 2019, he has signed contract with OriOra Pistoia of the Italian Lega Basket Serie A (LBA).

In June 2019, Mitchell signed with Trotamundos de Carabobo.

In February 2020, Mitchell signed with AS Salé in Morocco.

In December 2020, Mitchell signed with Peñarol de Mar del Plata.

On October 1, 2021, Mitchell has signed with TaiwanBeer HeroBears of the T1 League.

On October 28, 2022, Mitchell signed with Al-Muharraq of the Bahraini Premier League.

On March 28, 2023, Mitchell signed with Al-Bahrain of the Bahraini Premier League.

On August 8, 2023, Mitchell signed with Beirut Club of the Lebanese Basketball League.

On January 10, 2024, Mitchell joined Al Ahly Benghazi. On February 27, he joined Al Ahly Cairo for the 2024 BAL season. On April 19, 2024, Mitchell made his BAL debut and had 11 points, 8 rebounds and 4 assists in a 99–76 opening day win over the City Oilers.

On October 2, 2024, Mitchell joined Unión de Santa Fe of the Liga Nacional de Básquetbol (LNB). On November 7, Mitchell left Unión de Santa Fe.

On November 21, 2024, Mitchell re-joined Al-Muharraq of the Bahraini Premier League.

On September 11, 2025, Mitchell joined Beirut Club of the Lebanese Basketball League.

== National team career ==
Mitchell became a naturalized Libyan citizen in December 2023, ahead of the 2023 Arab Basketball Championship.

== Career statistics ==
Legend
GP	Games played	GS	Games started	MPG	Minutes per game
FG%	Field goal percentage	3P%	3-point field goal percentage	FT%	Free throw percentage
RPG	Rebounds per game	APG	Assists per game	SPG	Steals per game
BPG	Blocks per game	PPG	Points per game	**Bold**	Career high

=== NBA ===
Year	Team	GP	GS	MPG	FG%	3P%	FT%	RPG	APG	SPG	BPG	PPG
2013–14	Milwaukee	3	0	3.3	.600	.000	.750	.3	.3	.3	.0	2.0
Career		3	0	3.3	.600	.000	.750	.3	.3	.3	.0	2.0

=== College ===
All statistics per Sports Reference.

Year	Team	GP	GS	MPG	FG%	3P%	FT%	RPG	APG	SPG	BPG	PPG
2009–10	Alabama	30	18	23.3	.487	.263	.586	5.9	.6	1.3	.7	9.2
2010–11	Alabama	**37**	**32**	**31.5**	**.522**	**.316**	**.658**	**7.1**	1.3	**1.6**	1.1	**15.2**
2011–12	Alabama	22	21	31.1	.450	.311	.615	7.0	**1.8**	1.0	**1.4**	13.1
Career		89	71	28.6	.493	.301	.630	6.7	1.2	1.4	1.0	12.7
