= Chris Hines =

American basketball player (born 1987)

Minnesota Timberwolves
- Title: Assistant coach
- League: NBA

Personal information
- Born: September 19, 1987 (age 39) Evergreen, Alabama, U.S.
- Listed height: 6 ft 9 in (2.06 m)
- Listed weight: 230 lb (104 kg)

Career information
- High school: Hillcrest-Evergreen (Evergreen, Alabama); North Atlanta Prep (Atlanta, Georgia)
- College: SW Illinois JC (2007–2009); Alabama (2009–2011)
- NBA draft: 2011: undrafted
- Playing career: 2011–2015
- Position: Forward

Career history

Playing
- 2011–2012: Zalakeramia-ZTE KK
- 2013–2014: Atlanta Aliens
- 2014: Plymouth Raiders
- 2014–2015: Atlanta Aliens

Coaching
- 2022–present: Minnesota Timberwolves (assistant)

Career highlights
- GRAC champion (2009)

Chris Hines (born September 19, 1987) is an American former professional basketball player, and currently serves as an assistant coach for the Minnesota Timberwolves of the National Basketball Association (NBA). Hines played college basketball for the University of Alabama, and later the Atlanta Aliens of the American Basketball Association (ABA).

== Early life ==
Hines was put up for adoption when he was six days old. His father, Patrick Nelson, died when he was 5 years old. After his adopted mother, Lois Hines, died when Hines was 10, he bounced around from home to home, living with relatives in Montgomery and Evergreen. He later found basketball which became his passion and hobby, keeping him off the streets and out of trouble.

== High school career ==
Hines attended Hillcrest-Evergreen High School in Evergreen, Alabama. As a junior in 2004–05, he averaged 26 points and 8.5 rebounds per game. As a senior in 2005–06, he averaged 25 points, 12 rebounds and 2.5 blocks per game as he led Hillcrest-Evergreen to the 2006 Alabama Class 4A State Championship. He was the 2006 Alabama Class 4A Player of the Year, as well as the Most Valuable Player of the 2006 Alabama Class 4A State Tournament. He also earned Alabama Sports Writers Association's 2006 Alabama All-State "Super Five" Team honors and was runner-up for Alabama's Mr. Basketball honor. In 2006–07, he spent a prep year at North Atlanta Prep in Atlanta, Georgia.

== College career ==
Due to a low ACT score, Hines was unable to qualify academically for a Division I school and thus enrolled at Southwestern Illinois College. In his freshman season at SWIC, he averaged 14 points and nine rebounds, earning all-region and all-conference accolades as the team finished as the region runner-up with a 28–5 record for head coach Jay Harrington.

Prior to his sophomore season, Hines committed to the University of Alabama in October 2008. In his sophomore season at SWIC, averaged 20 points and 12 rebounds per game that season to help his squad to a 35–4 record. He was a first-team junior college All-American in 2009 after leading Southwestern Illinois Community College to the NJCAA National Tournament and the Region 24 title.

As a junior for Alabama in 2009–10, Hines appeared in all 32 games and started the final 14 games of the season. He averaged 3.7 points, 4.2 rebounds and 1.0 steals per game and was subsequently named the teams' Most Improved Player. As a senior in 2010–11, he averaged 5.5 points, 6.1 rebounds, 1.3 assists, 1.5 steals and 1.5 blocks in 37 games (36 starts).

== Professional career ==
Hines went undrafted in the 2011 NBA draft. In October 2011, he signed with Zalakeramia-ZTE KK of Hungary for the 2011–12 season. He later left Zalakeramia in January 2012 after appearing in 10 games.

In the summer of 2013, Hines joined the Atlanta Aliens for the 2013–14 ABA season. On January 1, 2014, he departed Atlanta and left for China. After a trial run in China, he signed with the Plymouth Raiders for the rest of the 2013–14 British Basketball League season on January 17, 2014. He later left Plymouth in late February after appearing in five games where he averaged 9.0 points, 7.8 rebounds and 1.0 steals per game.

In October 2014, Hines re-joined the Atlanta Aliens for the 2014–15 season.

== Post-playing career ==
Following his playing career, Hines joined the Minnesota Timberwolves organization as a development coach. On August 8, 2024, he was promoted to the role of assistant coach/director of player development. On September 11, 2025, Hines was promoted to serve primarily as an assistant coach.
