= Jerry Harper =

American basketball player

Personal information
- Born: August 4, 1934 Louisville, Kentucky, U.S.
- Died: September 16, 2001 (aged 67)
- Listed height: 6 ft 8 in (2.03 m)

Career information
- High school: Flaget (Louisville, Kentucky)
- College: Alabama (1952–1956)
- NBA draft: 1956: 3rd round, 20th overall pick
- Drafted by: New York Knicks
- Position: Center / power forward
- Number: 8, 88

Career history
- 1956–1957: Houston Ada Oilers
- 1957–1958: Phillips 66ers

Career highlights
- 2× First-team All-SEC (1955, 1956); AAU All-American (1956)
- Stats at Basketball Reference

Jerry "Moose" Harper (August 4, 1934 – September 16, 2001) was an American basketball player best known for his collegiate career at the University of Alabama between 1952 and 1956. Harper, a native of Louisville, Kentucky, was 6 ft 8 in (2.03 m) and played the center and forward positions.

Decades later, Harper's 1,688 career rebounds still stands as the SEC all-time record and 8th overall in NCAA history.

Harper was the #20 (3rd round) overall pick of the New York Knicks in the 1956 NBA Draft.

== Playing career ==
In 1952–53, his freshman season, he was voted a second team All-Southeastern Conference (SEC) by the Associated Press (AP). He averaged 17.8 points and 17.0 rebounds per game in 21 games played. His sophomore year, Harper once again averaged 17.8 points per game, although his rebounds dipped to 14.9 per game in 24 games played. The AP selected him to their All-SEC third team. In Harper's final two seasons, he averaged 21.0 points and 19.0 rebounds for his junior year, and 22.3 points and 21.5 rebounds as a senior. This rebounding mark still stands as the best in the history of the Southeastern Conference.

Harper became the first Crimson Tide player to lead his team in scoring all four years en route to finishing with 1,861 for his career, while his 1,688 career rebounds place him eighth all-time in the history of NCAA Division I men's basketball. Harper was the first player in school history to average 20 or more points per game for a career, and in one game against Kentucky during his senior season, he scored 38 points and grabbed 26 rebounds. That game, which the Crimson Tide won 101–77, was the first time Kentucky had ever allowed 100 or more points.

In 1954–55 and 1955–56, Harper was selected as a first team All-American. These squads became known as the famed "Rocket 8" teams, with Harper guiding the latter to the 1956 Southeastern Conference championship. His 517 rebounds that year are a still-standing Alabama record.

After college, Harper was selected in the 1956 NBA draft by the New York Knickerbockers with the #20 overall pick (3rd round). But he never ended up playing in the league. Instead, he played for the Houston Ada Oilers and the Phillips 66ers of the AAU National Industrial Basketball League (AAU), which was still a semi-professional league at the time. An injury prematurely ended his career.

== Honors ==
Harper was inducted into the Alabama Sports Hall of Fame in 2001.

== Personal ==
Harper worked for Phillips Petroleum until he relocated to Montgomery, Alabama, where he went into business for the remainder of his career. He died of a longstanding illness on September 16, 2001, at age 67.

== See also ==
- List of NCAA Division I men's basketball career rebounding leaders
