= Tony Pujol =

Cuban-American basketball coach (born 1967)

Current position
- Title: Head coach
- Team: North Alabama
- Conference: UAC
- Record: 111–135 (.451)
- Annual salary: 4yr/$150,000

Biographical details
- Born: July 20, 1967 (age 59)

Playing career
- 1986–1989: Sterling (KS)

Coaching career (HC unless noted)
- 1992–1995: La Progresiva Presbyterian
- 1995–2004: Northwest Christian Academy
- 2004–2006: Appalachian State (assistant)
- 2006–2009: VCU (assistant)
- 2009–2014: Alabama (assistant)
- 2016–2018: Wyoming (assistant)
- 2018–present: North Alabama

Head coaching record
- Overall: 111–135 (.451)
- Tournaments: 0–1 (CBI); 0–1 (NIT)

Accomplishments and honors

Championships
- ASUN regular season (2025)

Antonio Javier Pujol (born July 20, 1967) is a Cuban American college basketball coach, and the current head coach of the North Alabama Lions men's basketball team.

== Playing career ==
Pujol played both basketball and baseball at Sterling College in Kansas, where he earned all-conference honors in baseball three straight seasons.

== Coaching career ==
Pujol's coaching career began in 1992 when he became the head boys basketball coach at La Progresiva Presbyterian HS in Miami, Florida. In 1995, Pujol accepted the head boys basketball coaching position at Northwest Christian Academy in Miami, where he stayed for 13 seasons and posted a 250–46 record, while winning state titles in 1999, 2003 and 2004. Pujol broke through in the college ranks as an assistant coach at Appalachian State in 2004 under Houston Fancher. He stayed for two seasons before joining Anthony Grant's staff at VCU from 2006 to 2009 where he was part of three Colonial Athletic Association regular season title squads and two CAA conference tournament title winners, including an upset win over Duke in the 2007 NCAA tournament.

After the 2009 season, Pujol followed Grant to join his staff at Alabama, where he stayed until 2014, as he took a year and a half off from coaching. Pujol returned to coaching in 2016, joining the staff at Wyoming under Allen Edwards.

On April 2, 2018, Pujol was named the seventh head coach in North Alabama history and became the Lions' first head coach in the Division I era as the school transitioned to the ASUN Conference starting in 2018.

== Head coaching record ==
=== College ===
Record table
Season	Team	Overall	Conference	Standing	Postseason
North Alabama Lions (ASUN Conference) (2018–2026)
2018–19	North Alabama	10–22	7–9	6th	
2019–20	North Alabama	13–17	8–8	5th	
2020–21	North Alabama	13–11	7–8	5th	
2021–22	North Alabama	9–21	2–14	6th (West)	
2022–23	North Alabama	18–15	10–8	6th	CBI First Round
2023–24	North Alabama	15–17	8–8	T–6th	
2024–25	North Alabama	24–11	14–4	T–1st	NIT First Round
2025–26	North Alabama	9–21	4–14	12th	
2026–27	North Alabama	0–0	0–0		
North Alabama:		111–135 (.451)	60–73 (.451)		
Total:		111–135 (.451)			
National champion Postseason invitational champion Conference regular season champion Conference regular season and conference tournament champion Division regular season champion Division regular season and conference tournament champion Conference tournament champion
