= JaMychal Green =

American basketball player (born 1990)

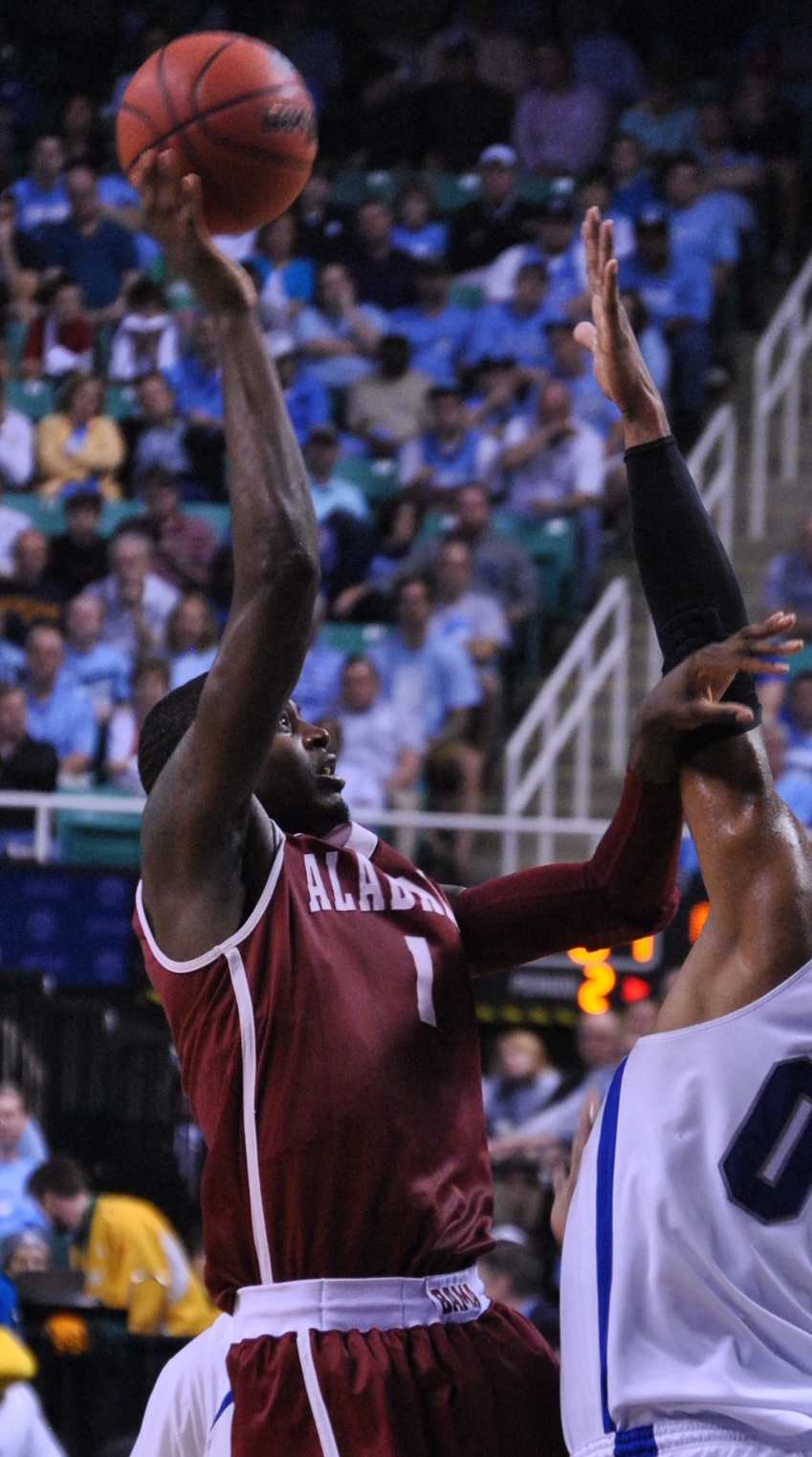
- Green with Alabama in 2012

Personal information
- Born: June 21, 1990 (age 36) Montgomery, Alabama, U.S.
- Listed height: 6 ft 9 in (2.06 m)
- Listed weight: 227 lb (103 kg)

Career information
- High school: St. Jude (Montgomery, Alabama)
- College: Alabama (2008–2012)
- NBA draft: 2012: undrafted
- Playing career: 2012–2023
- Position: Power forward / center
- Number: 32, 41, 0, 4, 1

Career history
- 2012–2013: Austin Toros
- 2013–2014: Chorale Roanne
- 2014–2015: Austin Spurs
- 2015: San Antonio Spurs
- 2015–2019: Memphis Grizzlies
- 2019–2020: Los Angeles Clippers
- 2020–2022: Denver Nuggets
- 2022–2023: Golden State Warriors

Career highlights
- NBA D-League All-Star (2015); NBA D-League All-Rookie Second Team (2013); First-team All-SEC (2011); Second-team All-SEC (2012); Third-team Parade All-American (2008); McDonald's All-American (2008); Alabama Mr. Basketball (2008)
- Stats at NBA.com
- Stats at Basketball Reference
Medals
Men's basketball
Representing United States
FIBA Americas U-18 Championship
Silver medal – second place	2008 Argentina	Team

JaMychal Green (born June 21, 1990) is an American former professional basketball player, who played for nine seasons in the National Basketball Association (NBA). He played college basketball for the Alabama Crimson Tide. Green started his career in the G League (then D-League) and overseas before signing his first NBA contract with the San Antonio Spurs in 2015. He also played for the Memphis Grizzlies, Los Angeles Clippers, Denver Nuggets, and Golden State Warriors.

== High school career ==
Green led Montgomery's St. Jude to the Class A State Championship in 2006 and 2008, and was voted the MVP of the 2006 tournament. He scored more than 2,500 points in his high school career, and was a member of the National Honor Society at St. Jude. He also garnered many awards in his high school career, including: 2008 McDonald's All-American, 2008 Alabama Mr. Basketball, a three-time Alabama Sportswriters Association "Player of the Year" (2006, 2007 and 2008), and was also rated the #6 overall and #1 power forward in the 2008 recruiting class according to ESPN. Green also played for the USA National U18 Team in Argentina at the 2008 FIBA Americas Under-18 Championship where he was coached by Anthony Grant, who would eventually serve as his head coach during his time at Alabama.

== College career ==
On August 23, 2007, Green committed to Alabama over Ole Miss. During his freshman year at The Capstone, Green started all but one of 32 games on the season, while averaging 11.6 points per game and ranking first in rebounding among SEC freshmen with 7.9 per game. He was second among all SEC players with five double-doubles, including four consecutive double-doubles against Georgia, Vanderbilt, Florida and Mississippi State. He was a unanimous Freshman All-SEC selection, and named a collegeinsider.com Freshman All-American.

During his second season, he finished ninth in the SEC in rebounding (7.2) and 17th in scoring (14.1). He scored in double figures in 10 of the last 11 games in the 2009–10 season, including eight straight at one point. Green was named to the 2009 Old Spice Classic all-tournament team; he won the game against No. 15 Michigan with a put-back dunk with 5.4 seconds left and blocked Michigan's game-tying shot attempt as time expired. Green posted his career-high 27 points with 13 rebounds in a win over Mercer and was named the SEC Player of the Week for his efforts.

To start his junior season, Green changed his number from 32 to 1, and was named to the first team All-SEC voted on by the coaches. After Alabama went 0–3 in the Paradise Jam tournament, Green was suspended for three games for "conduct detrimental to the team" by Anthony Grant; Alabama went 2–1 in Green's absence. On January 22, 2011, Green scored 15 points against the Auburn Tigers, surpassing 1,000 points for his career at Alabama.

== Professional career ==
=== Austin Toros (2012–2013) ===
After going undrafted in the 2012 NBA draft, Green joined the San Antonio Spurs for the 2012 NBA Summer League. On October 22, 2012, he signed with the Spurs, but was later waived by the team on October 26. On November 1, he was acquired by the Austin Toros of the NBA Development League as an affiliate player of San Antonio. In 44 games for the Toros in 2012–13, he averaged 12.3 points, 8.3 rebounds and 1.3 assists per game.

=== Chorale Roanne (2013–2014) ===
In July 2013, Green joined the Los Angeles Clippers for the 2013 NBA Summer League. On September 30, 2013, he signed with the Clippers, but waived by the team on October 8. On October 31, he signed with Chorale Roanne of France for the 2013–14 season. In 25 games for the club, he averaged 11.8 points and 6.6 rebounds per game.

=== Return to Austin (2014–2015) ===
In July 2014, Green joined the San Antonio Spurs for the 2014 NBA Summer League. On August 6, 2014, he signed with the Spurs, but later waived by the team for a second time on October 25. On November 1, he was acquired by the Austin Spurs.

=== San Antonio Spurs (2015) ===
On January 18, 2015, Green signed a 10-day contract with the San Antonio Spurs. Following the expiration of his contract on January 28, the Spurs decided to not re-sign Green to a second 10-day contract, and he subsequently returned to Austin.

=== Memphis Grizzlies (2015–2019) ===
Before reappearing in a game for Austin, Green returned to the NBA, signing a 10-day contract with the Memphis Grizzlies on February 2, 2015. He signed a second 10-day contract with the Grizzlies on February 19, and then a multi-year contract on March 2.

Green returned to the Grizzlies for the 2015–16 season and played decent minutes off the bench early on. His minutes increased post All-Star break thanks to multiple injured teammates, and on March 6, 2016, he scored a then career-high 17 points in a loss to the Phoenix Suns. On March 9, he recorded 17 points and a then career-high 13 rebounds in a loss to the Boston Celtics. Two days later, he recorded a then career-high 21 points and 10 rebounds in a 121–114 overtime win over the New Orleans Pelicans.

On December 8, 2016, Green had a career-high 18 rebounds in an 88–86 win over the Portland Trail Blazers. His previous best was 17 rebounds, which he recorded earlier in the week against the New Orleans Pelicans. On February 4, 2017, he scored a career-high 29 points in a 107–99 win over the Minnesota Timberwolves.

After the 2016–17 season, Green became a restricted free agent. On September 27, 2017, Green re-signed with the Grizzlies to a two-year, $17 million-plus deal.

After starting in the first two games of the 2018–19 season, Green missed the next 12 games with a broken jaw. He moved to a reserve role upon returning to the line-up, and on December 7, he scored a season-high 24 points in a 107–103 win over the Pelicans. On January 12, he recorded 24 points and 11 rebounds in a 112–108 loss to the Miami Heat.

=== Los Angeles Clippers (2019–2020) ===
On February 7, 2019, Green and Garrett Temple were traded to the Los Angeles Clippers in exchange for Avery Bradley. On July 18, 2019, Green re-signed with the Clippers.

=== Denver Nuggets (2020–2022) ===
On November 30, 2020, Green signed with the Denver Nuggets on a multi-year contract. On February 8, 2022, Green scored 20 points off the bench during a 132–115 win against the New York Knicks.

=== Golden State Warriors (2022–2023) ===
On June 23, 2022, Green was traded, alongside a 2027 protected first-round pick, to the Oklahoma City Thunder in exchange for the draft rights to Peyton Watson and two future second-round picks. On July 20, Green and the Thunder reached a contract buyout agreement. On August 1, 2022, Green officially signed with the Golden State Warriors.

On May 5, 2023, in Game 2 of the Western Conference Semifinals against the Los Angeles Lakers, Green drew a spot start with Kevon Looney suffering from illness. In 13 minutes, he scored 15 points (including three 3-pointers) in the 127–100 victory.

== NBA career statistics ==
Legend
GP	Games played	GS	Games started	MPG	Minutes per game
FG%	Field goal percentage	3P%	3-point field goal percentage	FT%	Free throw percentage
RPG	Rebounds per game	APG	Assists per game	SPG	Steals per game
BPG	Blocks per game	PPG	Points per game	**Bold**	Career high

=== Regular season ===
Year	Team	GP	GS	MPG	FG%	3P%	FT%	RPG	APG	SPG	BPG	PPG
2014–15	San Antonio	4	0	6.3	.571	.000	–	1.5	.0	.0	.5	2.0
2014–15	Memphis	20	1	7.0	**.575**	.000	.800	2.0	.2	.3	.2	2.7
2015–16	Memphis	**78**	15	18.5	.465	.333	.752	4.8	.9	.6	.4	7.4
2016–17	Memphis	77	**75**	27.3	.500	.382	.802	7.1	1.1	.6	.4	8.9
2017–18	Memphis	55	54	**28.0**	.457	.339	.721	**8.4**	**1.4**	.6	.5	**10.3**
2018–19	Memphis	41	4	22.0	.484	.396	.788	6.1	.9	**.8**	**.6**	9.8
2018–19	L.A. Clippers	24	2	19.6	.482	**.413**	.810	6.5	.6	.5	.3	8.7
2019–20	L.A. Clippers	63	1	20.7	.429	.387	.750	6.2	.8	.5	.4	6.8
2020–21	Denver	58	5	19.3	.463	.399	.807	4.8	.9	.4	.4	8.1
2021–22	Denver	67	8	16.2	.486	.266	**.871**	4.2	.9	.6	.4	6.4
2022–23	Golden State	57	1	14.0	.540	.378	.776	3.6	.9	.4	.4	6.4
Career		544	166	20.1	.477	.368	.784	5.5	.9	.5	.4	7.7

=== Playoffs ===
Year	Team	GP	GS	MPG	FG%	3P%	FT%	RPG	APG	SPG	BPG	PPG
2015	Memphis	5	0	1.6	.000	.000	**1.000**	.6	.0	.2	.2	.4
2016	Memphis	4	0	18.0	.545	.000	.500	3.8	.8	**.8**	**1.3**	6.8
2017	Memphis	4	2	19.7	.472	.438	**1.000**	3.3	.3	.0	.0	7.3
2019	L.A. Clippers	6	**3**	**23.5**	.535	**.522**	.800	**5.3**	.8	.7	.0	**11.0**
2020	L.A. Clippers	**13**	0	17.1	**.564**	.435	.778	3.8	.5	.2	.2	6.1
2021	Denver	10	0	19.0	.444	.300	.889	5.2	**1.1**	.2	.2	5.4
2022	Denver	5	0	13.7	.375	.200	**1.000**	2.4	.4	.0	.2	4.0
2023	Golden State	7	2	7.0	.391	.278	–	.7	.4	.0	.1	3.3
Career		56	7	15.5	.488	.383	.826	3.4	.6	.2	.2	5.6
