= Trevor Releford =

American basketball player (born 1991)

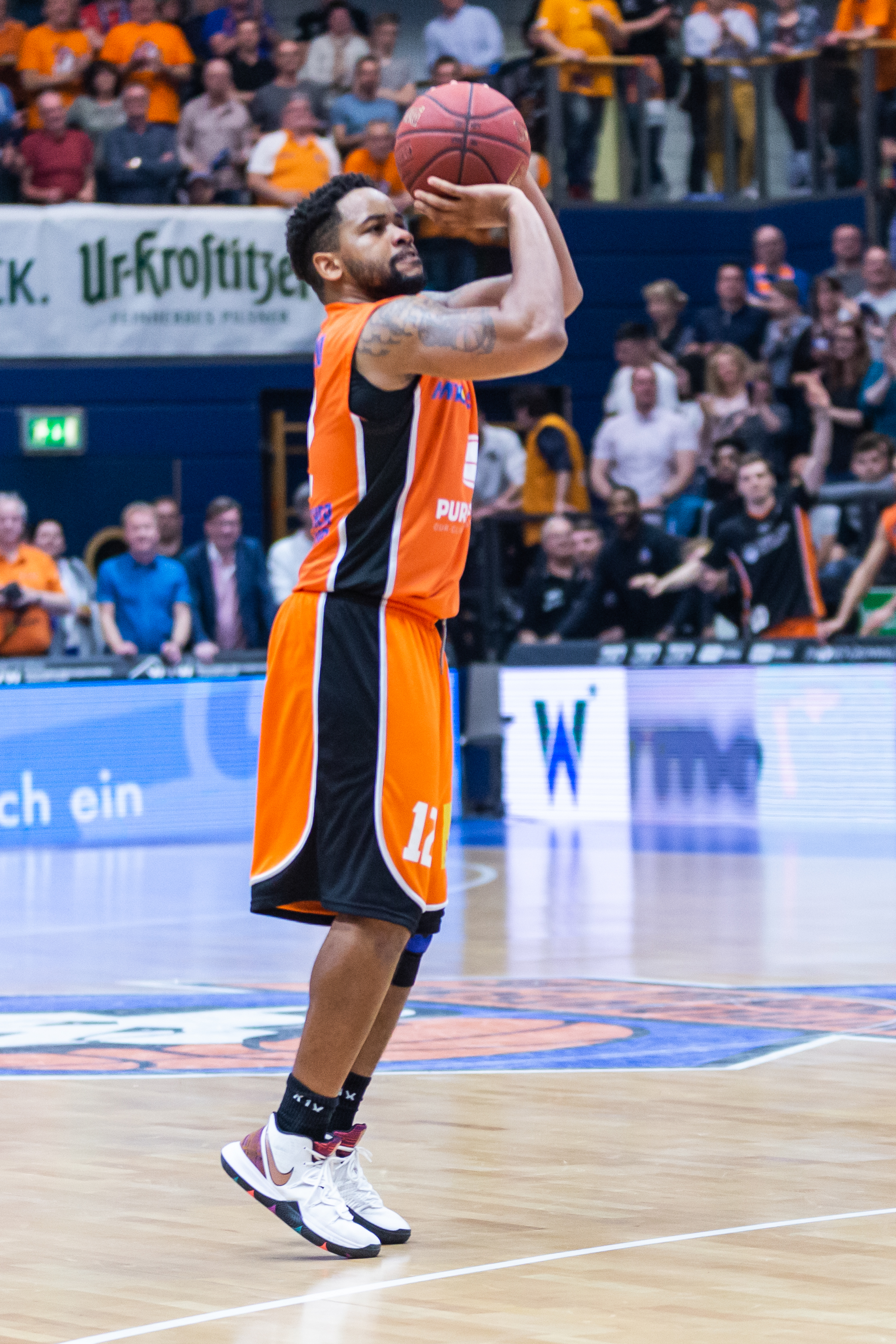
- Releford with Mitteldeutscher BC in 2019

Personal information
- Born: December 23, 1991 (age 34)
- Listed height: 6 ft 0 in (1.83 m)
- Listed weight: 190 lb (86 kg)

Career information
- High school: Bishop Miege (Roeland Park, Kansas)
- College: Alabama (2010–2014)
- NBA draft: 2014: undrafted
- Playing career: 2014–2020
- Position: Point guard

Career history
- 2014–2015: Wilki Morskie Szczecin
- 2015–2016: Kolossos Rodou
- 2016: Maccabi Kiryat Gat
- 2016–2017: Kolossos Rodou
- 2017–2018: Promitheas Patras
- 2018–2019: Mitteldeutscher BC
- 2019–2020: Löwen Braunschweig

Career highlights
- First-team All-SEC (2013); Second-team All-SEC (2012); SEC All-Defensive team (2013); SEC All-Rookie team (2011)

Trevor Releford (born December 23, 1991) is an American former basketball player. He played college basketball for the University of Alabama. He has a brother, Travis Releford, who played basketball for Kansas.

== High school career ==
Trevor Releford played summer basketball for KC Pump n Run a highly touted travel team based out of Kansas City, MO, from his freshman year and throughout his high school years. As a junior at Kansas's Bishop Miege High School, Releford averaged 18.6 points, 6.3 assists and 2.1 steals per game. He was named a first-team All-Metro selection and lead the team to a 5A State Finals appearance, where they lost to Topeka's Highland Park.

In his senior season, Releford averaged 19.7 points and 6.7 assists per game his senior season and was a member of their 2010 5A State Championship Team. He was named the Kansas City Star's All-Metro Player of the Year and the best ball-handling prep guard by Slam Magazine.

Trevor was also a standout football player at Bishop Miege and helped lead the school to the Kansas Class 4A State Championship in 2009. That year, he was named Kansas Class 4A First Team All-State by The Wichita Eagle and The Topeka Capitol Journal. He earned a First Team nod on 2009 All-Metro Sports Kansas City team, and was a Unanimous First Team All-Eastern Kansas League choice at Defensive Back. ESPN.com called Trevor one of the best free safety prospects in the class of 2010.

Although the younger Releford ended up in Tuscaloosa, Alabama coach Anthony Grant originally recruited his brother Travis and had no idea that the older Releford had a younger brother who played basketball as well.

== College career ==
Prior to his senior season, Releford committed to the Alabama Crimson Tide and Coach Anthony Grant over Oklahoma and Tennessee. He cited early playing time, the idea of "changing the program" at Alabama, and Coach Grant as being major influences upon his decision. During his freshman year, Releford started in 36 of 37 games, missing one for an illness, for the Crimson Tide at point guard and was twice named Southeastern Conference (SEC) Freshman of the Week. In his freshman year he was named to the SEC All-Freshmen team; also earned all-NIT honors for the tournament. He averaged 11.0 points per game and 3.4 assist per game as a freshman. He is one of four University of Alabama freshmen to ever start the season-opening game at point guard.

For his sophomore year, 2011–12, he averaged 12.0 points per game, 2.1 assist per game, and 2.1 steals per game. He led the team in steals per game and was one of the leaders for the SEC. Releford was named second-team All-SEC by the league's coaches. Releford led the University of Alabama to the NCAA basketball tournament, but was narrowly eliminated in the first round by Creighton University.

For his junior year, 2012–13, he averaged 14.9 points per game, 2.8 assist per game, and 2.3 steals per game. Releford led the University of Alabama in scoring and steals, setting the school record for career steals. His 36 points against LSU was his season best. He was named first-team All-SEC for the first time in his career. Releford led the University of Alabama to the NIT Tournament, and they advanced to the Sweet Sixteen of the tournament before being defeated by a score of 57–58 against the University of Maryland.

On February 11, 2012, Releford was one of three Alabama players suspended for the road game at LSU for a violation of team rules.

On March 9, 2013, Releford made a buzzer-beating game-winning mid-court shot to enable a 61–58 victory over Georgia. The heave, which was the result of a steal on Georgia's offensive side of the court with less than five seconds remaining in the game, led to the three-point play that broke a 58-point draw at the horn.

== Professional career ==
After going undrafted in the 2014 NBA draft, Releford signed with King Wilki Morskie of the Tauron Basket Liga on July 31, 2014. In his first professional season, he averaged 18.2 points and 4.6 assists per game.

On August 25, 2015 Releford signed with Kolossos Rodou of the Greek Basket League. Releford was the top scorer of Kolossos Rodou in the Greek Basket League 2015–2016, averaging 13.8 points per game.

On July 19, 2016, Releford signed with the Israeli team Maccabi Kiryat Gat. On October 17, 2016, Releford left Kiryat Gat and returned to Kolossos Rodou. At his second spell with Kolossos, Releford averaged 12.6 points 3.7 assists and 2.7 rebounds per game in 24 regular season games.

On June 10, 2017, Releford signed with Promitheas Patras of the Greek Basket League. On January 6, he left Promitheas.

On July 2, 2018, he joined Mitteldeutscher BC of the Basketball Bundesliga (BBL).

On September 18, 2019, Releford was announced by Basketball Löwen Braunschweig. He averaged 13.1 points and 5.3 assists per game in Bundesliga play. On August 31, 2020, Releford parted ways with the team.
