= Dan Hipsher =

American basketball player-coach (born 1954)

Current position
- Title: Associate head coach
- Team: Loyola Chicago
- Conference: MVC

Biographical details
- Born: December 4, 1954 (age 71)

Playing career
- 1973–1977: Bowling Green

Coaching career (HC unless noted)
- 1977–1978: Miami (OH) (GA)
- 1978–1980: Miami–Dade CC (assistant)
- 1980–1989: Dayton (assistant)
- 1989–1993: Wittenberg
- 1993–1995: Stetson
- 1995–2004: Akron
- 2005–2007: Arkansas (assistant)
- 2007–2009: South Florida (assistant)
- 2009–2013: Alabama (assistant)
- 2013–2016: Texas–Pan American / Texas–Rio Grande
- 2016–2020: Oakland (associate HC)
- 2021–present: Loyola Chicago (associate HC)

Head coaching record
- Overall: 265–248

Accomplishments and honors

Championships
- 4 NCAC regular season (1990–1993); 2 NCAC Tournament (1990, 1991); 1 MAC East Division (1998)

Awards
- NCAC Coach of the Year (1990); Atlantic Sun Coach of the Year (1995)

Dan Hipsher (born December 6, 1954) is the associate head coach for the Loyola Ramblers men's basketball team. He was previously the head coach at Wittenberg University, Stetson University, the University of Akron and Texas–Rio Grande Valley.

In 1977, he graduated from Bowling Green State University, where he was captain of the basketball team for two seasons.

From 1981 to 1989, Hipsher served as an assistant coach at the University of Dayton under Don Donoher. His first head coaching position was at Wittenberg University, where he compiled a 97–18 record while winning four North Coast Athletic Conference titles and two NCAC Tournament titles. He left Wittenberg for Stetson University, where he served as head coach for two years.

From 1995 to 2004, he served as men's basketball head coach at the University of Akron. During his nine seasons as Akron head coach, Hipsher guided the team to a 112–137 record. He was named both Ohio College and Mid-American Conference Coach of the Year in 1998.

After Akron, Hipsher was hired by Stan Heath at the University of Arkansas. When Heath was fired in 2007, Hipsher followed him to the University of South Florida. Hipsher worked two seasons under Heath at USF.

In April 2009, Hipsher accepted an assistant coaching position at the University of Alabama under Anthony Grant. Grant played at Dayton during Hipsher's stint as an assistant for the Flyers.

Hipsher once received a job recommendation from legendary coach, Bob Knight. Knight answered his mobile phone during a speech in Nashville, Indiana to recommend Hipsher to an unknown caller.

== Head coaching record ==
Statistics overview
| Season | Team | Overall | Conference | Standing | Postseason |
|---|---|---|---|---|---|
Wittenberg Tigers (North Coast Athletic Conference) (1989–1993)
| 1989–90 | Wittenberg | 29–2 | 11–1 | 1st | NCAA Division III Elite Eight |
| 1990–91 | Wittenberg | 26–3 | 11–1 | 1st | NCAA Division III Second Round |
| 1991–92 | Wittenberg | 23–6 | 15–1 | T–1st | NCAA Division III First Round |
| 1992–93 | Wittenberg | 19–7 | 13–3 | T–1st | |
| Wittenberg: | | 97–18 (.843) | 50–6 (.893) | | |
Stetson Hatters (Atlantic Sun Conference) (1993–1995)
| 1993–94 | Stetson | 14–15 | 9–7 | T–3rd | |
| 1994–95 | Stetson | 15–12 | 11–5 | T–2nd | |
| Stetson: | | 29–27 (.518) | 20–12 (.625) | | |
Akron Zips (Mid-American Conference) (1995–2004)
| 1995–96 | Akron | 3–23 | 0–18 | 10th | |
| 1996–97 | Akron | 8–18 | 6–12 | 9th | |
| 1997–98 | Akron | 17–10 | 13–5 | 1st (East) | |
| 1998–99 | Akron | 18–9 | 12–6 | 4th (East) | |
| 1999–00 | Akron | 17–11 | 11–7 | 3rd (East) | |
| 2000–01 | Akron | 12–16 | 9–9 | 6th (East) | |
| 2001–02 | Akron | 10–21 | 5–13 | 7th (East) | |
| 2002–03 | Akron | 14–14 | 9–9 | 3rd (East) | |
| 2003–04 | Akron | 13–15 | 7–11 | 6th (East) | |
| Akron: | | 112–137 (.450) | 74–90 (.451) | | |
Texas–Pan American Broncs / Texas–Rio Grande Valley Vaqueros (Western Athletic Conference) (2013–2016)
| 2013–14 | Texas–Pan American | 9–23 | 5–11 | 7th | |
| 2014–15 | Texas–Pan American | 10–21 | 4–10 | T–7th | |
| 2015–16 | Texas–Rio Grande Valley | 8–22 | 4–10 | T–6th | |
| Texas–Pan American / Texas–Rio Grande: | | 27–66 (.290) | 13–31 (.295) | | |
| Total: | | 265–248 (.517) | | | |
National champion Postseason invitational champion Conference regular season champion Conference regular season and conference tournament champion Division regular season champion Division regular season and conference tournament champion Conference tournament champion
