= Rodney Cooper =

American professional basketball player

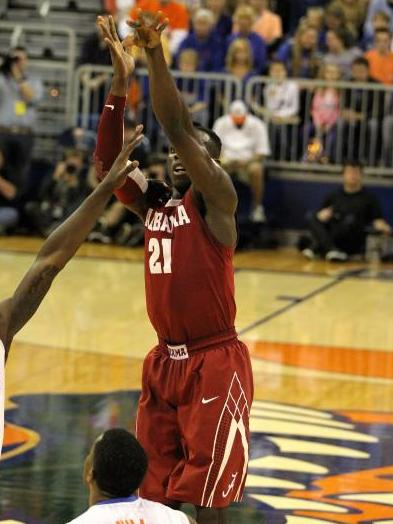

Free agent
- Position: Shooting guard / small forward

Personal information
- Born: March 20, 1993 (age 33) Hurtsboro, Alabama, U.S.
- Listed height: 6 ft 6 in (1.98 m)
- Listed weight: 215 lb (98 kg)

Career information
- High school: Russell County (Seale, Alabama)
- College: Alabama (2011–2015)
- NBA draft: 2015: undrafted
- Playing career: 2015–present

Career history
- 2015: Gigantes del Estado de México
- 2016: Maine Red Claws

Career highlights
- First-team Parade All-American (2011)

Rodney Cooper (born March 20, 1993) is an American former professional basketball player who last played for the Maine Red Claws of the NBA G League. He played college basketball for Alabama.

== College career ==
After graduating high school, Cooper attended Alabama where he averaged 11.1 points, 3.7 rebounds and 0.6 steals as a senior, scored 1,122 points over his career, and was named Alabama's Most Outstanding Defensive Player.

== Professional career ==
After going undrafted in the 2015 NBA draft, Cooper signed with Soproni KC of the Hungarian League on August 8, 2015. He was 1 of 8 rookies to play in that league. In October 2015, he signed with Gigantes del Estado de México of the Mexican League, where he averaged 15.0 points, 3.0 rebounds, 3.0 assists and 1.7 steals after three games.

On December 1, 2016, Cooper was acquired by the Maine Red Claws of the NBA Development League. That night, he made his debut in a 101–91 win over the Erie BayHawks.

In 2018, Cooper got drafted in the G League Draft by the Houston Rockets affiliate the Rio Grande Valley Vipers.

== Personal life ==
The son of Richard and Rosemary Cooper, he majored in Business Marketing at the University of Alabama.

In July 2022, he founded VitaEra, a company that produces powdered hydration mixes. He has partnered with the Birmingham Bulls and several Alabama high schools to provide them hydration beverages.
