= Carl Engström (basketball) =

Swedish basketball player

Free agent
- Position: Center

Personal information
- Born: September 26, 1991 (age 35) Ystad
- Listed height: 7 ft 1 in (2.16 m)
- Listed weight: 265 lb (120 kg)

Career information
- High school: Sydskånska gymnasiet
- College: Alabama (2010–14)
- NBA draft: 2014: undrafted
- Playing career: 2014–present

Career history
- 2014–2015: Södertälje Kings

Carl Engström (born September 26, 1991) is a Swedish professional basketball player.

== College statistics ==
College	Year	GP	MIN	SPG	BPG	RPG	APG	PPG	FG%	FT%	3P%
Alabama	2010–11	21	5.3	0.2	0.4	1.2	0.1	0.4	.176	.600	.000
Alabama	2011–12	25	8.3	0.1	0.6	1.8	0.2	1.0	.478	.400	.000
Alabama	2012–13	7	12.6	0.4	1.0	2.7	0.1	3.3	.692	.833	.000
Alabama	2013–14	31	11.8	0.1	0.5	2.5	0.3	1.6	.541	.625	.000
