= Anthony Grant (basketball) =

American basketball player and coach (born 1966)

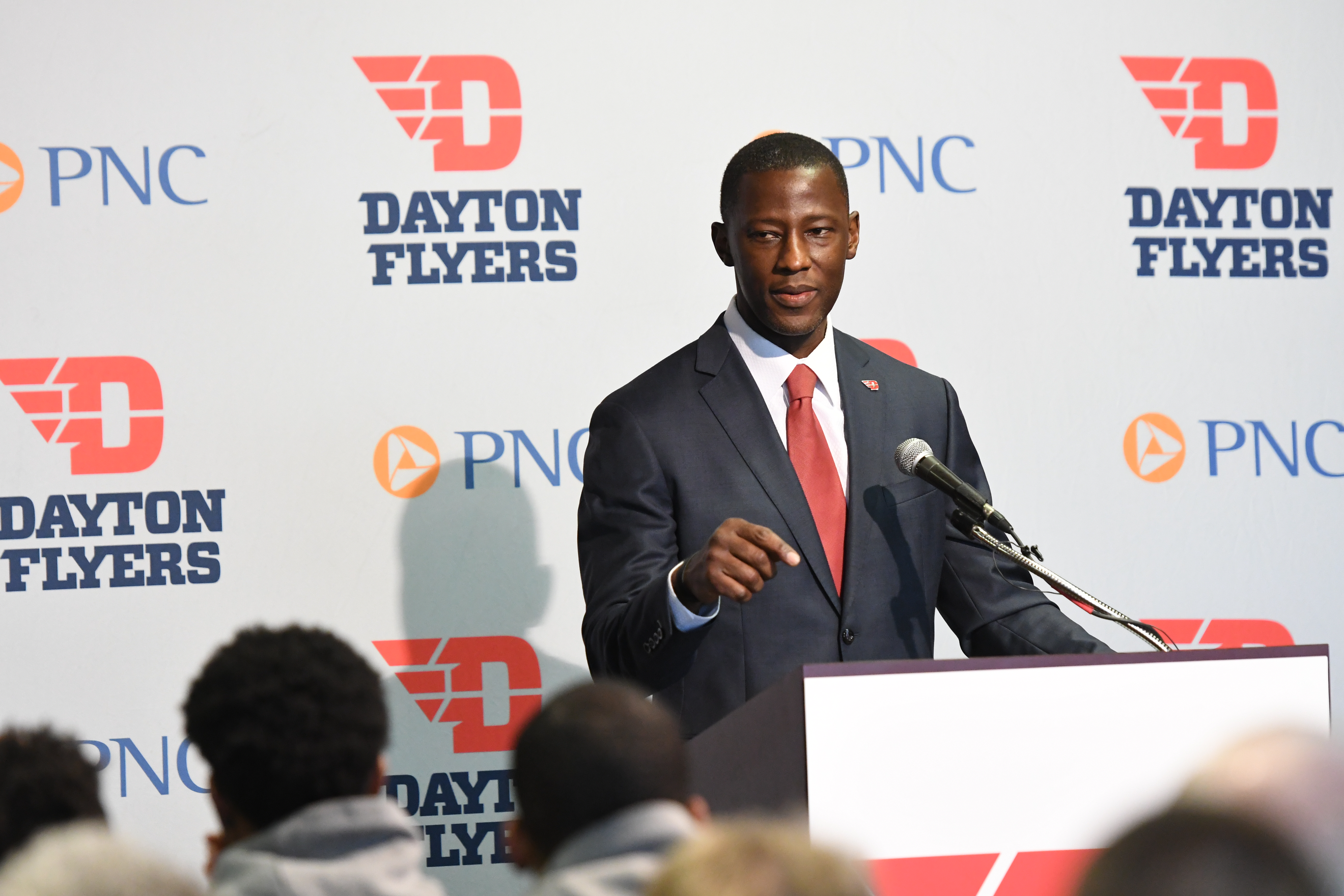
- Grant arrives at Dayton in 2017

Current position
- Title: Head coach
- Team: Dayton
- Conference: A-10
- Record: 200–99 (.669)

Biographical details
- Born: April 15, 1966 (age 60); Miami, Florida, U.S.

Playing career
- 1983–1987: Dayton

Coaching career (HC unless noted)
- 1987–1992: Miami HS (assistant)
- 1992–1993: Miami Central HS
- 1993–1994: Stetson (assistant)
- 1994–1996: Marshall (assistant)
- 1996–2006: Florida (assistant)
- 2006–2009: VCU
- 2009–2015: Alabama
- 2015–2017: Oklahoma City Thunder (assistant)
- 2017–present: Dayton

Head coaching record
- Overall: 393–209 (.653)
- Tournaments: 2–4 (NCAA Division I); 11–9 (NIT)

Accomplishments and honors

Championships
- 2× CAA tournament champion (2007, 2009); 3× CAA regular season champion (2007–2009); SEC Western Division champion (2011); A-10 regular season champion (2020)

Awards
- Naismith College Coach of the Year (2020); AP National Coach of the Year (2020); Henry Iba Award (2020); NABC Coach of the Year (2020); Sporting News National Coach of the Year (2020); Atlantic 10 Coach of the Year (2020); CAA Coach of the Year (2007)

Anthony Duvale Grant (born April 15, 1966) is an American basketball coach who is the head men's basketball coach at the University of Dayton. Prior to that, he was the head coach at Virginia Commonwealth University from 2006 to 2009, and at the University of Alabama from 2009 to 2015. Prior to becoming the VCU head coach, he was an assistant coach at the University of Florida from 1996 to 2006.

== Early life ==
After graduating from Miami Senior High School, Grant became an All-City first-team selection and Player-of-the-Year.

He played at the University of Dayton from 1983 to 1987 while residing at 3 Evanston (The Gateway) and guiding them to the Elite Eight of the NCAA Tournament before bowing out to eventual national champion Georgetown.

As a sophomore, Grant averaged 10.7 points a game and 6.5 rebounds a game and the Flyers again made it to the NCAA Tournament.

As a junior, the 6'5" Grant moved from power forward to small forward and averaged 7.1 points a game and 4.8 rebounds a contest while the team advanced to the National Invitation Tournament.

As a senior, Grant was named a team captain, was awarded team MVP, and won the Sharpenter Memorial Rebounding Award after leading the squad in scoring and rebounding, averaging 13.0 and 6.0 respectively. In his 105 appearances, Grant averaged 11.6 points and 6.7 rebounds. In 1987, Grant spent a year playing for the Miami Tropics of the United States Basketball League.

In 1987, Grant became an assistant coach and math teacher at Miami Senior High School under Marcos "Shaky" Rodriguez.

== Coaching career ==
=== Assistant coach ===
Grant served for ten years as an assistant to Billy Donovan at the University of Florida (UF). The 1999 and 2000 teams made the first back-to-back Sweet 16 appearances in school history and the 2000 squad made UF's first appearance in the National Championship game, where they lost to Michigan State. In the spring of 2002, Grant was elevated to the title of Associate Head Coach after serving as an assistant for his first six seasons.

Grant played a key role in helping the Gators to the 2006 NCAA title, the 2005 and 2006 Southeastern Conference tournament titles, three SEC Eastern Division titles and back-to-back SEC Championships in 2000 and 2001. The Gators reached eight straight NCAA Tournaments, capped by the national title in 2006 in which Florida became the first team since the 1968 UCLA Bruins to win both the national semifinal and the final by at least 15 points. The Gators were 226–98 (.698) during Grant's 10-year stint in Gainesville. Prior to the University of Florida, Grant served as an assistant to Donovan for two years at Marshall University helping them to a 35–20 record. Grant also served as an assistant coach during the 1993–94 season at Stetson.

=== Virginia Commonwealth ===
Grant led VCU to a 79–77 upset of 6th seeded Duke to reach the 2nd round of the 2007 NCAA tournament. Two of Grant's VCU players were drafted as first round draft picks in the 2009 (Eric Maynor) and 2010 NBA drafts (Larry Sanders).

=== Alabama ===
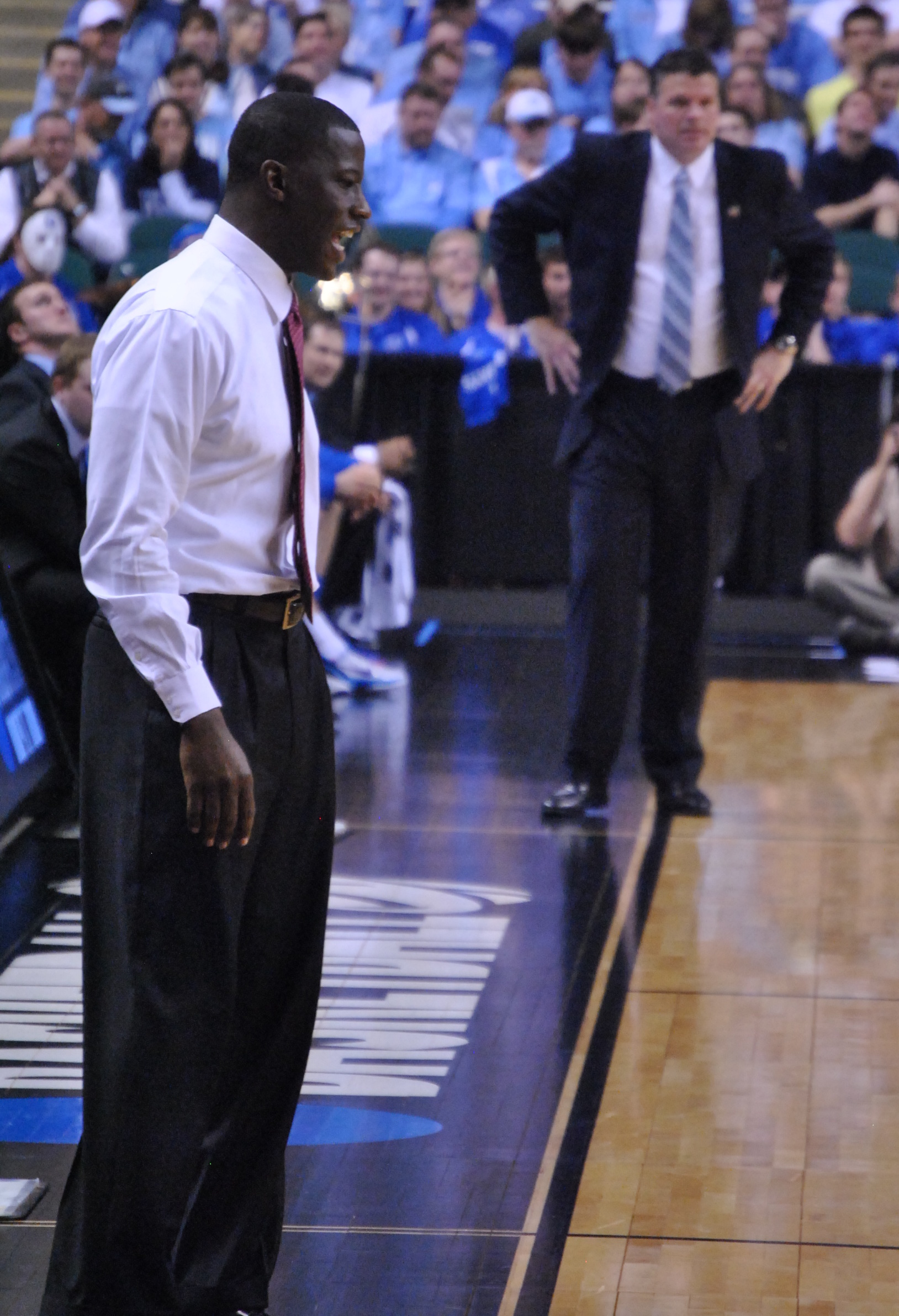
Grant in 2012

On March 27, 2009, Grant agreed in principle to become the twentieth head men's basketball coach at the University of Alabama.

In Grant's first season at Alabama, the Crimson Tide went 17–15 (6–10), winning their last two regular season games to clinch a winning record and the 4th seed in the west in the 2010 SEC men's basketball tournament. They would go on to lose in the quarterfinals to #2 Kentucky.

In his second season at the Capstone, Grant's young team struggled early in the season, going 8–6 during non-conference play, but bounced back, going 12–4 in SEC play, to win the SEC Western Division title. Grant also got his first "signature" win, when Alabama defeated #12 Kentucky in Coleman Coliseum, 68–66. Dick Vitale has noted Grant as one of his "Coaches on the Rise". He guided Alabama to the NIT Final in Madison Square Garden in only his second year.

Grant reached the 2012 NCAA tournament in his third season. That marked Alabama's first appearance since 2006. However, it was short-lived; the Tide lost to Creighton in the opening round of the tournament.

In Grant's fourth season at Alabama, the Crimson Tide started strong but struggled in December due to injuries. The Tide finished a surprising 12–6 in SEC play, tied for 2nd place in the league. After winning one game in the SEC Basketball Tournament, the Tide lost to Florida the next day, 61–51. Grant's team lost to Miami in the National Invitation Tournament quarterfinals by a score of 58–57.

On March 15, 2015, Grant was fired from Alabama.

=== NBA ===
On June 29, 2015, Grant was hired by the Oklahoma City Thunder to be an assistant coach under coach Billy Donovan.

=== Dayton ===
On March 30, 2017, the University of Dayton announced that Grant would be the program's new head coach after the departure of Archie Miller to Indiana University.

For the 2019–20 season, Grant was named the Sporting News National Coach of the Year and Naismith College Coach of the Year, following the team's 29–2 record and third-place finish in the AP Poll ranking. The team was unable to compete in the March Madness tournament due to the COVID-19 pandemic.

== Head coaching record ==
Record table
Season	Team	Overall	Conference	Standing	Postseason
VCU Rams (Colonial Athletic Association) (2006–2009)
2006–07	VCU	28–7	16–2	1st	NCAA Division I Round of 32
2007–08	VCU	24–8	15–3	1st	NIT First Round
2008–09	VCU	24–10	14–4	1st	NCAA Division I Round of 64
VCU:		76–25 (.752)	45–9 (.833)		
Alabama Crimson Tide (Southeastern Conference) (2009–2015)
2009–10	Alabama	17–15	6–10	T–4th (West)	
2010–11	Alabama	25–12	12–4	1st (West)	NIT Runner–up
2011–12	Alabama	21–12	9–7	5th	NCAA Division I Round of 64
2012–13	Alabama	23–13	12–6	T–2nd	NIT Quarterfinal
2013–14	Alabama	13–19	7–11	T–10th	
2014–15	Alabama	18–14	8–10	T–8th	NIT Second Round*
Alabama:		117–85 (.579)	54–48 (.529)		
Dayton Flyers (Atlantic 10 Conference) (2017–present)
2017–18	Dayton	14–17	8–10	9th	
2018–19	Dayton	21–12	13–5	3rd	NIT First Round
2019–20	Dayton	29–2	18–0	1st	No postseason held
2020–21	Dayton	14–10	9–7	7th	NIT First Round
2021–22	Dayton	24–11	14–4	T–2nd	NIT Second Round
2022–23	Dayton	22–12	12–6	T–2nd	
2023–24	Dayton	25–8	14–4	3rd	NCAA Division I Round of 32
2024–25	Dayton	23–11	12–6	T–3rd	NIT Second Round
2025–26	Dayton	25–12	12–6	4th	NIT Quarterfinal
2026–27	Dayton	3–4	0–0		
Dayton:		200–99 (.669)	112–48 (.700)		
Total:		393–209 (.653)			
National champion Postseason invitational champion Conference regular season champion Conference regular season and conference tournament champion Division regular season champion Division regular season and conference tournament champion Conference tournament champion

*Grant was fired prior to the 2015 NIT and did not coach in the Tide's two NIT games.
