= COCE =

COCE may refer to:

- Conservation and Use of Wild Populations of Coffea arabica, a German research project, full name "Conservation and Use of Wild Populations of Coffea arabica in the Montane Rainforests of Ethiopia"
- Cocaine esterase, an enzyme

== See also ==
- Coce, a Croatian surname
