= Donald Landry =

American scientist

Donald W. Landry

Interim President of the University of Florida
- In office September 1, 2025 – June 22, 2026
- Preceded by: Kent Fuchs (interim)
- Succeeded by: Stuart R. Bell

Personal details
- Spouse: Maureen O'Reilly-Landry
- Children: 2
- Education: Lafayette College; Harvard University (PhD); Columbia University (MD)
- Awards: Presidential Citizens Medal

Donald W. Landry is an American organic chemist and physician. He is the Hamilton Southworth Professor of Medicine at Columbia University and chief physician at NewYork-Presbyterian Hospital since 2008. He is also the founding director of the Division of Experimental Therapeutics, and past director of the Division of Nephrology. He served as interim president of the University of Florida from September 2025 to June 2026.

== Personal life ==
Raised in Jersey City, New Jersey, Landry graduated in 1972 from St. Peter's Preparatory School and was later inducted in the school's alumni hall of fame.

He graduated from Lafayette College in 1975. Landry completed his Ph.D. in organic chemistry with R.B. Woodward at Harvard University in 1979 and then obtained an M.D. degree from Columbia University in 1983. After completing his residency in internal medicine at the Massachusetts General Hospital / Harvard Medical School, he returned to Columbia for training as an NIH Physician-Scientist, 1985–90, and has remained as a member of the Columbia faculty.

His wife, Maureen, is a clinical psychologist and psychoanalyst. They have two sons, Christopher and Michael. The eldest of 4, Donald has 3 younger siblings, Robert, Thomas and John.

== Work and achievements ==
Landry directed the Doris Duke Clinical Research Fellowship Program's Columbia site and co-directed the Advanced Pathophysiology course for 4th-year medical students at the Columbia College of Physicians and Surgeons, both for over a decade. Landry was a member of the President's Council on Bioethics and is co-chair of the Witherspoon Council for Ethics and the Integrity of Science. He is a founder of Tonix Pharmaceuticals (NASDAQ: TNXP), a member of the Board of Directors of Sensient Technologies, and chair of the scientific advisory board of Applied Therapeutics, Inc., which was founded based on his patents and now trades on NASDAQ. He is co-founder of Tegrigen Therapeutics, a biotech start-up focused on integrin targets.

Landry was elected to membership of the American Society for Clinical Investigation and the Association of American Physicians. He is listed in Who's Who in the World and in 2015 was inducted at the Smithsonian as an elected Fellow of the National Academy of Inventors. Landry received the Presidential Citizens Medal, the nation's second-highest civilian honor, from President George W. Bush at the Oval Office in 2008 "for diverse and pioneering research and his efforts to improve the well-being of his fellow man."

He is president of the American Academy of Sciences and Letters.

== Research ==
Landry has focused on novel approaches to intractable health problems, combining medicine and organic chemistry. His work on cocaine addiction led to the discovery of an artificial enzyme to degrade cocaine. His report on the enzyme, published in Science, was chosen by the American Chemical Society as one of the 25 most important chemistry papers in the world for 1993. An agent (Cocaine esterase) he co-developed to treat cocaine overdose has entered clinical trials from Tonix Pharmaceuticals. He founded the Columbia Organic Chemistry Collaborative Center and it is through this Center that he conducts his current work on drug discovery.

Landry discovered a new hormone deficiency syndrome: vasopressin deficiency in vasodilatory shock. In pioneering the use of vasopressin to treat septic shock and vasodilatory shock after cardiopulmonary bypass, he changed clinical practice for these life-threatening conditions. He also founded ICU nephrology at Columbia, introducing continuous renal replacement therapy to treat renal failure in patients with shock.

Landry developed an alternative method for the production of human embryonic stem cells that relies on harvesting live, normal cells from embryos that—by objective, peer-reviewed criteria—have died of natural causes. Cells harvested from dead embryos would be covered under the established ethics governing transplantation of essential organs from deceased donors.
