= Tonix Pharmaceuticals =

Commercial pharmaceutical company

- Type: Public
- Traded as: Nasdaq: TNXP
- Industry: Biotechnology; Healthcare
- Headquarters: New York, New York, United States
- Key people: Seth Lederman, MD – CEO
- Website: www.tonixpharma.com

Tonix Pharmaceuticals (Tonix Pharmaceuticals Holding Corp.) is a pharmaceutical company based in Chatham, New Jersey that focuses on repurposed drugs for central nervous system conditions and as of 2020 was also pursuing a vaccine for COVID-19 and a biodefense project.

== History ==
The company's predecessors were Tamandare Explorations Inc. which had been formed in 2007 as a mining wildcat vehicle focused on land in Nevada and the shares of which were traded over the counter, and L & L Technologies, LLC, which had been formed in 1996 by Seth Lederman and Donald Landry to repurpose drugs for CNS development. L&L had formed Janus Pharmaceuticals, Inc., which later became Vela Pharmaceuticals, Inc. to develop some of its inventions, and Vela returned those assets to L&L in 2006. L&L placed them in a subsidiary called Krele Pharmaceuticals, Inc., and that subsidiary and Tamandare Explorations Inc. performed a reverse merger in October 2011; the new entity was renamed Tonix Pharmaceuticals Holding Corp. and Lederman was named CEO. It was listed on the NASDAQ exchange in 2013 under the symbol TNXP, and in December 2021 Tonix was added to the NASDAQ Biotechnology Index (Nasdaq:NBI). Tonix regained compliance for continued listing on The Nasdaq Capital Market in June 2022 by closing at a value of at least $1.00 per share for a time frame greater than or equal to 10 consecutive business days, criteria established by Nasdaq Listing Rule 5550(a)(2).

Ernest Mario, a scientist and former CEO of Glaxo Holdings Inc, served on the board of Tonix in the past.

Tonix finalized the purchase of a 40,000 square foot facility in Massachusetts in 2020 to house its new Advanced Development Center (ADC) for accelerated development and manufacturing of vaccines, including vaccines for COVID-19. This facility has been functional since June 2022. Tonix additionally purchased a 44-acre parcel of land in Hamilton, Montana at the end of 2020 for the construction of a vaccine production facility. In October 2021, Tonix announced the acquisition of a 48,000 square foot research and development center in Frederick, Maryland to support the Company's infectious disease pipeline. The facility was purchased from Southern Research, one of Tonix's collaborators on TNX-1800 and TNX-801 development.

Tonix licensed from University of Geneva, their technology for oxytocin-based treatments for treating insulin resistance, diabetes, and obesity allowing Tonix to expand its intranasal potentiated oxytocin development program, TNX-1900, into cardiometabolic syndromes.

In March 2021, Tonix announced the issuance of a U.S. patent for compositions and uses of tianeptine oxalate salt, the active ingredient in TNX-601 CR. The patent provides Tonix with U.S. market exclusivity until December 2037 for claims directed to pharmaceutical compositions comprising crystalline tianeptine oxalate salts, to methods of using those compositions to treat various disorders, and to methods of producing oxalate salts.

== Indications and Programs ==
Since its formation in 2011, Tonix Pharmaceuticals has developed therapeutics for patients with chronic conditions.

=== Fibromyalgia ===
Fibromyalgia is a medical condition characterized by chronic widespread pain and a heightened pain response to pressure. Other symptoms include tiredness to a degree that normal activities are affected, sleep problems and troubles with memory. Some people also report restless legs syndrome, bowel or bladder problems, numbness and tingling and sensitivity to noise, lights or temperature. Fibromyalgia is frequently associated with depression, anxiety and posttraumatic stress disorder. Other types of chronic pain are also frequently present.

Tonix announced in September 2020 their plan to complete the Phase 3 RELIEF study of TNX-102 SL, a sublingual formulation of cyclobenzaprine, for management of fibromyalgia with currently enrolled participants. The enrollment of this study was completed in July 2020. An independent statistical team, the independent data monitoring committee (IDMC), conducted the unblinded interim analysis of the primary endpoint and made the non-binding recommendation that the trial continue to completion with the addition of 210 participants to the original sample size of 470 participants, which is the maximum number of participants that could be added under the interim statistical analysis plan.

In early September 2020, Tonix had enrolled the first participant in the Pivotal Phase 3 RALLY study of TNX-102 SL for the management of fibromyalgia. and in December 2020, the company announced top-line data results from the RELIEF Phase 3 trial that showed that TNX-102 SL reporting that the trial met its primary endpoint, significantly reducing daily pain compared to placebo in people with fibromyalgia. In June 2023, results from the RELIEF Phase 3 trial were published in the peer-reviewed journal Arthritis Care & Research, an official journal of the American College of Rheumatology.

Tonix enrolled its first participant in the Phase 3 RESILIENT study of TNX-102 SL for the management of fibromyalgia in April 2022. In December 2023, Tonix announced topline results of the Phase 3 RESILIENT study, reporting that the trial met its primary endpoint, significantly reducing daily pain compared to placebo. The trial also saw statistically significant and clinically meaningful results in all key secondary endpoints related to improving sleep quality, including reducing fatigue and improving overall fibromyalgia symptoms and function.

In January 2024, Tonix announced that the U.S. Food and Drug Administration (FDA) had conditionally accepted the trade name, TONMYA™, for TNX-102 SL for the management of fibromyalgia.

On August 15, 2025, the U.S. Food and Drug Administration approved TNX-102 SL as TONMYA™ for the management of fibromyalgia, making it the first new FDA-approved fibromyalgia therapy in over 15 years. (NDA 219428)

The approval was supported by statistically significant results from two pivotal Phase 3 studies: the RELIEF trial (TNX-FIH-301) and the RESILIENT trial (TNX-FIH-304).

=== Migraines ===
The U.S. FDA cleared Tonix's IND Application to begin Phase 2 study of TNX-1900 (intranasal potentiated oxytocin) for the treatment of chronic migraine (link to Wikipedia Migraine page) headaches in November 2021.

On July 19, 2022, the United States Patent and Trademark Office (USPTO) issued U.S. Patent 11,389,473 to Tonix for its intranasal candidate TNX-1900 for treatment of pain. The patent, entitled "Magnesium-Containing Oxytocin Formulations and Methods of Use" claims methods and compositions for treating pain, including that incident to migraine headaches, using intranasal magnesium-containing oxytocin formulations. This patent is expected to provide Tonix with U.S. market exclusivity until January 2036.

=== Binge Eating ===
Binge eating disorder (BED) is a mental health condition, which is often associated with other behavioral conditions, such as depression, substance abuse, and posttraumatic stress disorder. Evidence suggests that oxytocin may reduce food intake by acting on neural pathways involved in reward and impulse control, processes believed to be dysregulated in BED.

In March 2022, Massachusetts General Hospital and Tonix Pharmaceuticals announced a research collaboration to initiate Phase 2 trials to investigate TNX-1900* in treatment for BED. This 8-week randomized, double-blind, placebo-controlled study aims to recruit 60 patients with BED and obesity and plans to evaluate whether TNX-1900 reduces bingeing frequency and body weigh.

=== Post Traumatic Stress Disorder ===
Post-traumatic stress disorder is a mental disorder that can develop after a person is exposed to a traumatic event, such as sexual assault, warfare, traffic collisions, child abuse, or other threats on a person's life. Symptoms may include disturbing thoughts, feelings, or dreams related to the events, mental or physical distress to trauma-related cues, attempts to avoid trauma-related cues, alterations in how a person thinks and feels, and an increase in the fight-or-flight response. These symptoms last for more than a month after the event. Young children are less likely to show distress, but instead may express their memories through play. A person with PTSD is at a higher risk of suicide and intentional self-harm.

Tonix continued work on TNX-102 SL in PTSD; the IND for that use had been accepted in 2014 and in December 2016 after the Phase IIa trial was done, TNX-102 was granted Breakthrough Therapy designation by the FDA in December 2017 which was rescinded in January 2019, but then restored in March 2019. A Phase 3 trial of military-related PTSD began in February 2017, but was stopped in July 2018 after an interim analysis of 50% of target participants were evaluated, for "inadequate separation on primary efficacy endpoint". In March 2020, a later Phase 3 trial of TNX-102 SL for PTSD in from mostly civilian traumas also showed futility at an interim analysis of 50% of its target participants patients were evaluated and enrollment was discontinued. FDA Breakthrough Therapy designation was rescinded again in May 2020.

=== COVID-19 ===
Coronavirus disease 2019 (COVID-19) is a contagious disease caused by severe acute respiratory syndrome coronavirus 2 (SARS-CoV-2). The first case was identified in Wuhan, China, in December 2019. The disease has since spread worldwide, leading to an ongoing pandemic. In February 2020 Tonix began development of a potential vaccine to protect against COVID-19 with collaboration with Southern Research based on its live horsepox vaccine platform.

In September 2020, Tonix Pharma hosted and participated in a virtual webinar with Merck & Co. and IAVI to discuss the potential of T Cell Immunity in offering protection from COVID-19 infection. The live panel titled "Antibody vs. T Cell Immunity: Is a Single Vaccine Enough to Stop COVID-19?" was moderated by science journalist Clive Cookson of the Financial Times.

In November 2020, Tonix announced preliminary, preclinical results in which non-human primates vaccinated with TNX-1800 manifested "takes" (skin reaction) associated with functional T cell immunity.

In March 2021, Tonix reported positive COVID-19 vaccine efficacy results in non-human primates vaccinated with TNX-1800 and challenged with the live SARS-CoV-2 virus. Vaccine candidate TNX-1800 protected both the upper and lower airways, suggesting an ability to prevent forward transmission of the virus. In September 2021, Tonix announced receipt of an official written response from the FDA for a Type B pre-Investigational New Drug (IND) meeting with the U.S. Food and Drug Administration (FDA) to develop TNX-1800 as a potential SARS-CoV-2 vaccine.

Tonix in-licensed three murine monoclonal antibodies for treatment or prophylaxis of SARS-CoV-2 from Curia Global at the end of 2022. These antibodies will be developed as second-generation therapy for high-risk patients, including immunocompromised patients.

Additionally, as of February 2023, Tonix has obtained an exclusive license from Columbia University for the development of a portfolio of fully human (TNX-3600) and murine (TNX-4100) monoclonal antibodies (mAbs) for the treatment or prophylaxis of SARS-CoV-2 infection.

=== Long COVID Syndrome (Post-Acute Sequelae of COVID-19) ===
Earlier in 2022, Tonix announced results from a retrospective observational study of over 50,000 Long COVID patients, which found that approximately 40% had fibromyalgia-like multi-site pain. Among long COVID patients with multi-site pain, 36% were opioid users. Currently, Tonix is enrolling patients in the Phase 2 PREVAIL study of TNX-102 SL as a potential treatment for a subset of patients with Long COVID syndrome whose symptoms overlap with fibromyalgia.

=== Horsepox Platform, Monkeypox and Smallpox ===
In July 2017 the news division of the journal, Science, reported that Tonix had sponsored research and collaborating with scientists at the University of Alberta, David Evans and Ryan Noyce, and that the work had led to the generation of an extinct horsepox virus using synthetic biology—the lab had bought pieces of DNA from a reagent company and had built the horsepox genome with them. This invention was licensed to Tonix and Tonix announced that it intended to further develop it into a smallpox vaccine, TNX-801, which is a biodefense business model. The research was published in 2018. In December 2020, Tonix announced that independent researchers reported 99.7% colinear identity between a circa 1860 U.S. smallpox vaccine and horsepox virus. Tonix's TNX-801 is a preclinical horsepox-based live virus vaccine being developed as a potential vaccine to prevent smallpox and monkeypox. Tonix's TNX-801 is also the vector on which Tonix's COVID-19 experimental vaccine is based.

The United States Patent and Trademark Office (USTPO) issued Tonix Pharmaceuticals U.S. Patent No. 11, 345, 896, entitled "Synthetic Chimeric Poxviruses" in May 2022. This patent applies to synthetic horsepox virus, the basis for the Company's TNX-801 vaccine and Recombinant Pox Virus (PRV) platform, and is anticipated to grant Tonix with U.S. market exclusivity until 2037. Upon a global surge of Monkeypox cases, the Kenya Medical Research Institute (KE\MRI) and Tonix Pharmaceuticals announced a research collaboration to develop TNX-801 as a vaccine to protect against monkeypox and smallpox in July 2022. The Phase 1 clinical study is awaiting regulatory approval in Kenya.

In preclinical studies, TNX‑801—a single‑dose, recombinant horsepox live‑virus vaccine—demonstrated durable protection against mpox and rabbitpox in animal models, including those with compromised immune systems.

It is up to 100,000‑fold less virulent than live smallpox vaccine strains.

Notably, subcutaneous administration provided protection equivalent to traditional percutaneous delivery, informing clinical administration strategy.

=== Alcohol Use Disorder ===
Alcohol Use Disorder is a diagnostic classification of excessive alcohol use that results in significant mental or physical health problems. In August 2020, TNX-102 SL's Investigational New Drug (IND) application was also cleared by the U.S. Food and Drug Administration (FDA) for the initiation of a Phase 2 proof-of-concept study using TNX-102 SL for treatment of alcohol use disorder (AUD).

=== Cocaine Intoxication ===
In May 2019, Tonix reported in-licensing the Phase 2 asset, TNX-1300 (T172R/G173Q double-mutant cocaine esterase 200 mg, i.v. solution), for the treatment of cocaine intoxication. TNX-1300 (formerly known as RBP-8000) is being developed under an Investigational New Drug application (IND) for the treatment of cocaine intoxication. TNX-1300 is a recombinant protein enzyme produced through rDNA technology in a non-disease-producing strain of E. coli bacteria. Cocaine Esterase (CocE) was identified in bacteria (Rhodococcus) that use cocaine as its sole source of carbon and nitrogen and that grow in soil surrounding coca plants. The gene encoding CocE was identified and the protein was extensively characterized. CoCE catalyzes the breakdown of cocaine into metabolite ecgonine methyl ester and benzoic acid. Wild-type CocE is unstable at body temperature, so targeted mutations were introduced in the CocE gene and resulted in the T172R/G173Q Double-Mutant CocE, which is active for approximately 6 hours at body temperature. In a Phase 2 study, TNX-1300 at 100 mg or 200 mg i.v. doses was well tolerated and interrupted cocaine effects after cocaine 50 mg i.v. challenge. TNX-1300 is designated as a breakthrough therapy by the U.S. Food and Drug Administration (FDA). In June 2022, Tonix announced the design of a new Phase 2 clinical trial of TNX-1300 to treat cocaine intoxication that will be submitted to the U.S. FDA. Pending FDA agreement, this study is expected to include women and patients who have received naloxone.

In August 2022, Tonix received a federal grant from the National Institute on Drug Abuse (NIDA), to support development of TNX-1300 (T172R/G173Q double-mutant cocaine esterase 200 mg, i.v. solution) for the treatment of cocaine intoxication.

=== Organ Transplant ===
In January 2021, Tonix announced a second collaboration with Massachusetts General Hospital to work on TNX-1500, a monoclonal antibody targeting CD40-ligand with a focus on organ rejection in kidney transplantation. In August 2019, Tonix announced the signing of the first research collaboration agreement with Massachusetts General Hospital to develop TNX-1500, a humanized monoclonal antibody (mAb) that targets CD154 for the prevention and treatment of organ transplant rejection.

In January 2021, Tonix filed a patent application with the World Intellectual Property Organization covering the use of TNX-1500 for the prevention and treatment of autoimmune diseases such as multiple sclerosis (MS) and organ transplant rejection.

In September 2022, Tonix announced data from three presentations involving studies of TNX-1500 for organ transplant rejection. The data showed that TNX-1500 showed activity in preventing organ transplant rejection and was well-tolerated in non-human primates. The data also showed that TNX-1500 monotherapy consistently and safely prevented pathologic alloimmunity in non-human promate cardiac and kidney allograft models, as well as pathologic xenoimmunity in kidney xenograft models, both without clinical thrombosis.

Currently, Tonix has a sponsored research agreement with Boston Children's Hospital to study TNX-1500 for the prevention of graft-versus-host disease (GvHD) after hematopoietic stem cell transplantation (HCT) in animals.

=== Prader-Willi Syndrome ===
Prader-Willi Syndrome is a genetic condition caused by the loss of function of specific genes on chromosome 15. Symptoms of Prader-Willi Syndrome include a lack of suckling in infants that often leads to malnutrition, while older children and adults may experience insatiable hunger which leads to severe obesity.

In February 2021, Tonix announced that it had licensed technology from the French National Institute of Health and Medical Research (Inserm) to treat the rare genetic disorder Prader-Willi Syndrome. TNX-2900 (intranasal potentiated oxytocin) will be investigated for its ability to address feeding behavior issues in patients. A recent study suggests that oxytocin improves suckling in newborn animals and suppresses feeding behaviors in adult animal models.

=== Major Depressive Disorder ===
Major depressive disorder is a mental disorder characterized by at least two weeks of pervasive low mood with symptoms of low self-esteem, loss of interest in normally enjoyable activities, low energy, and pain without a clear cause.

In March 2021, Tonix announced that it received the official minutes from a Type B pre-investigational new drug (IND) meeting with the U.S. Food and Drug Administration (FDA) on its development plan for TNX-601 CR tablet for the treatment of major depressive disorder.

Tonix is currently developing an extended-release form of TNX-601 ER (tianeptine oxalate extended-release tablets), a naloxone-free formulation of TNX-601, to treat major depressive disorder. In October 2022, Tonix announced that the U.S. Food and Drug Administration (FDA) cleared the Investigational New Drug (IND) application for TNX-601 ER in Phase 2 trials for major depressive disorder.

=== Cancer ===
In November 2021, Tonix was issued the Patent No. 11, 167, 010, titled "Trefoil Family Factor Proteins and Uses Therof," from the U.S. Patent and Trademark Office issued giving Tonix claims to an isolated polypeptide comprising a carboxy-terminal, c-terminus (CTP) domain of the beta subunit of the human chorionic gonadotropin (hCG) fused to a protein. The following month Tonix began a research collaboration with Columbia University to study recombinant trefoil factor 2-based therapy TNX-1700 for the treatment of gastric and colorectal cancers.

At the American Association for Cancer Research (AACR) 2025 Annual Meeting, Tonix presented preclinical data indicating that a fusion protein (murine TFF2-MSA) combined with anti-PD1 therapy led to robust activation of CD8+ T cells and reduction of immunosuppressive PMN-MDSCs in gastric cancer animal models.

TNX-1700, the human TFF2-HSA fusion protein, is being developed under license from Columbia University as the lead immuno-oncology program targeting gastric and colorectal cancers.

In July 2025, Tonix published peer-reviewed preclinical results in Cancer Cell, showing that mTNX-1700 (mTFF2-MSA), when combined with anti-PD1, increased survival and significantly reduced metastases in multiple gastric cancer models—highlighting its potential to overcome checkpoint resistance by modulating tumor immunosuppression.
