= List of Providence College alumni =

This is a list of notable alumni of Providence College.

== Entertainment and communications ==
- David Angell – Emmy Award-winning television producer, victim of the September 11 attacks (was a passenger of American Airlines Flight 11)
- Doris Burke – sports analyst for ESPN, former Friars basketball player
- David R. Colburn – author and professor of history
- Wally Dunn – Broadway actor, most recently appeared in Gypsy and Spamalot
- Brett Epstein – actor, playwright
- Matt Farley – musician
- Peter Farrelly – film director, screenwriter, and producer
- Janeane Garofalo – actress, comedian
- Caryn James (as Caryn A. Fuoroli) – film and television critic, novelist
- Mike Leonard – television journalist on NBC's Today Show
- James O'Brien – film director, screenwriter, and producer
- John O'Hurley – actor, television host
- Sean McAdam – sportswriter covering the Boston Red Sox
- Edward Scanlon – Executive Vice President (retired) of NBC
- Paul G. Tremblay – author
- Joseph Ungaro – newspaper journalist

== Business ==
- Brian Burke – president of hockey operations of the Pittsburgh Penguins, former Friars ice hockey player
- Rich Gotham – president of Boston Celtics
- Karen Ignagni – president and CEO of America's Health Insurance Plans
- Lou Lamoriello – general manager of the New York Islanders
- John Marinatto – former commissioner of the Big East Conference
- Arthur F. Ryan – former chairman and CEO of Prudential Insurance Company of America
- Jack Tretton – former CEO of Sony Computer Entertainment America

== Politics and law ==
- Scott Avedisian – Mayor of Warwick, Rhode Island
- Michael Napolitano – Mayor of Cranston, Rhode Island
- Peter J. Barnes – Member of New Jersey State Parole Board, former New Jersey State Senator
- Jack Brennan – former chief of staff to Richard Nixon
- Frank Caprio – chief judge of Providence Municipal Court
- Arn Chorn-Pond – international human rights activist
- Jasiel Correia – former Mayor of Fall River, Massachusetts
- Richard M. Daley – Former Mayor of Chicago
- Richard J. Daronco – former United States federal judge
- Tom Dart – Sheriff of Cook County, Illinois
- Frank Devlin – former senior counsel to ExxonMobil in Houston, Texas
- Armando Diaz – Marshal of Italy, World War 1 commander (Providence College's first alumnus)
- Chris Dodd – former United States Senator representing Connecticut
- Thomas J. Dodd – former United States Senator representing Connecticut
- Benjamin Downing – currently the youngest Massachusetts State Senator
- John H. Fanning – former National Labor Relations Board Chair
- Joseph J. Fauliso – former Lt. Governor of Connecticut
- Raymond Flynn – former Mayor of Boston, former Friars basketball player
- Charles J. Fogarty – former Lt. Governor of Rhode Island
- John E. Fogarty – former United States Congressman representing Rhode Island
- Anthony D. Galluccio – former Massachusetts State Senator
- Maureen McKenna Goldberg – Associate Justice of the Rhode Island Supreme Court
- Sheila Harrington – Massachusetts State Representative for the First Middlesex District
- Patrick J. Kennedy – former United States Congressman representing Rhode Island, son of former United States Senator Ted Kennedy
- Kieran Lalor – founder of Eternal Vigilance Society and Iraq Vets for Congress
- J. Howard McGrath – former United States Attorney General and United States Senator representing Rhode Island
- William D. Mullins – member of the Massachusetts House of Representatives and baseball player
- M. Teresa Paiva-Weed – President of the Rhode Island State Senate
- Michael F. Rush – member of the Massachusetts House of Representatives
- John Shea – former member of Connecticut House of Representatives
- Fernand St. Germain – former United States Representative from Rhode Island
- William J. Sullivan – former Chief Justice of the Connecticut Supreme Court
- Robert Tiernan – former United States Representative from Rhode Island

== Academia ==
- Roy Peter Clark – Vice President and Senior Scholar at the Poynter Institute
- Hank Foley – President of New York Institute of Technology
- Mark Stephen Jendrysik – Political Science and Public Administration Chair, University of North Dakota
- Timothy J. Kehoe – Professor of Economics, University of Minnesota
- Clark R. McCauley – Professor of Science and Mathematics and co-director of the Solomon Asch Center for Study of Ethnopolitical Conflict at Bryn Mawr College
- Edward J. McElroy – President of American Federation of Teachers, Vice President of AFL-CIO
- Austin Sarat – Professor of Jurisprudence and Political Science at Amherst College

== Medicine ==
- Robert Gallo – biomedical researcher known for the discovery of Human Immunodeficiency Virus

== Religious life ==
- Joseph Augustine Di Noia – named Secretary of the Congregation for Divine Worship and Discipline of the Sacraments by Pope Benedict XVI.; currently the highest-ranking Dominican in the Curia of the Roman Catholic Church
- Archbishop Christopher Cardone, O. P. – Roman Catholic Metropolitan Archbishop of Auki, The Solomon Islands since 2016.
- Archbishop Thomas Cajetan Kelly, O.P. – Roman Catholic Metropolitan Archbishop Emeritus of Louisville, Kentucky (1982-2007)
- Brian Shanley, O.P. – President of Providence College

== Athletics ==
=== Men's basketball ===
- Marvin Barnes – former NBA and ABA all-star player
- Ben Bentil (born 1995) - Ghanaian basketball player for Hapoel Tel Aviv of the Israeli Basketball Premier League
- Ira Bowman – former NBA player
- Marques Bragg – former NBA player
- Marshon Brooks – NBA player with New Jersey Nets
- Troy Brown – former NBA player
- Marty Conlon – former NBA player
- Bryce Cotton – former NBA player, international professional basketball player
- Austin Croshere – former NBA player
- Sharaud Curry – international professional basketball player
- Ernie DiGregorio – former NBA player
- Billy Donovan – current head coach of Chicago Bulls. Former head coach of Oklahoma City Thunder, and two-time NCAA Men's Division I Basketball Championship head coach of Florida Gators men's basketball
- Marcus Douthit – NBA and international professional basketball player
- Kris Dunn – current NBA player, Utah Jazz
- Weyinmi Efejuku – international professional basketball player
- Johnny Egan – former NBA player and coach
- Raymond Flynn – former Mayor of Boston
- Rubén Garcés – former NBA and international professional basketball player
- Ryan Gomes – NBA player with Los Angeles D-Fenders
- Joe Hassett – former NBA player
- Herbert Hill – NBA and international professional basketball player
- Jonathan Kale – international professional basketball player
- Tuukka Kotti – international professional basketball player
- Māris Ļaksa – international professional basketball player
- Jim Larranaga – head coach of Miami Hurricanes men's basketball
- John Linehan – international professional basketball player
- Erron Maxey – international professional basketball player
- Ken McDonald – head coach of the Austin Spurs
- Donnie McGrath – international professional basketball player
- Eric Murdock – former NBA player
- Richard Pitino – head basketball coach for University of Minnesota
- Mike Riordan – former NBA player
- Andy Ronan - Olympic marathon runner and track coach for Stony Brook University
- Karim Shabazz – international professional basketball player
- God Shammgod – former NBA player
- Abdul Shamsid-Deen – former international professional basketball player
- Dickey Simpkins – former NBA player
- Michael Smith – former NBA player
- Kevin Stacom – former NBA player
- Jamel Thomas – former NBA player
- John Thompson – former Basketball Hall of Fame head coach of Georgetown Hoyas men's basketball
- Otis Thorpe – former NBA all-star player
- Jimmy Walker – former NBA all-star player
- Franklin Western – international professional basketball player
- Lenny Wilkens – Basketball Hall of Fame coach and player
- Eric Williams – former NBA player
- Jeff Xavier – international professional basketball player

=== Women's basketball ===
- Doris Burke – sports analyst for ESPN

=== Men's ice hockey ===
- Noel Acciari - Forward, Pittsburgh Penguins
- Tim Army
- Brian Burke – Former President and General Manager of the Toronto Maple Leafs
- Rich Costello
- Craig Darby
- John Ferguson, Jr.
- Rob Gaudreau
- Hal Gill
- Jon Gillies - Goaltender, New Jersey Devils
- Paul Guay
- Joe Hulbig
- Dave Kelly
- Regan Kelly
- Kurt Kleinendorst
- Jim Korn
- Jeff Mason
- Colin McDonald
- Bob Nicholson
- Gaetano Orlando
- Fernando Pisani
- Steve Rooney
- Nolan Schaefer
- Jeff Serowik
- Peter Taglianetti
- Brandon Tanev - Forward, Seattle Kraken
- Chris Terreri
- Chris Therien
- Randy Velischek
- Ron Wilson
- Pete Zingoni

=== Women's ice hockey ===
- Chris Bailey – member of the 1992, 1994, 1997, 1999, 2000 and 2001 US women's national ice hockey teams; member of the 1998 and 2002 US women's Olympic ice hockey teams; Olympic gold and silver medalist
- Laurie Baker – member of the 1997 and 2000 US women's national ice hockey teams; member of the 1998 and 2002 US women's Olympic ice hockey teams; Olympic gold and silver medalist
- Alana Blahoski – member of the 1997, 1999, 2000, and 2001 US women's national ice hockey teams; member of the 1998 US women's Olympic ice hockey team; Olympic gold medalist
- Lisa Brown-Miller – member of the 1990, 1992, 1994, and 1997 US women's national ice hockey teams; member of the 1998 women's Olympic ice hockey team; Olympic gold medalist; former head coach of Princeton University's women's ice hockey team
- Sara Decosta (born 1977) – member of the 2000 and 2001 US women's national ice hockey teams; member of the 1998 and 2002 US women's Olympic ice hockey teams; Olympic gold and silver medalist
- Cammi Granato – member of the 1990, 1992, 1994, 1997, 1999, 2000, 2001, 2004, and 2005 US women's national ice hockey teams; member of the 1998 and 2002 US women's Olympic ice hockey teams; Olympic gold and silver medalist; member of the United States Hockey Hall of Fame and the Hockey Hall of Fame in Toronto; broadcaster during the 2010 Vancouver Olympics for NBC Sports
- Mari Pehkonen – member of the 2006 and 2007 Finland women's national ice hockey team
- Karen Thatcher – member of the 2009–10 United States women's national ice hockey team, Olympic silver medalist

=== Baseball ===
- John McDonald
- Lou Merloni
- William D. Mullins
- Birdie Tebbetts

=== Track and field ===
- Mary Cullen – 2006 NCAA Champion, Irish long distance runner
- Martin Fagan – Irish Olympic distance runner
- Roisin McGettigan – Olympic 3000m steeplechase runner
- Emily Sisson – Olympian, holds the record for fastest American woman's marathon
- Geoff Smith – won Boston Marathon in 1984 and 1985
- Kim Smith – four-time NCAA Champion, Olympic distance runner for New Zealand
- John Treacy – 1984 silver medal winner at the 1984 Summer Olympics

=== Football ===
- Charles Avedisian – former New York Football Giants player
- Hank Soar – former New York Football Giants player and American League umpire

=== Men's soccer ===
- Chaka Daley
- Chris Konopka
- Ryan Maduro – All-American
- Julian Gressel
- Mac Steeves
- Karl Anderson
- Brendan McSorley
