= Billy Donovan =

American basketball coach (born 1965)

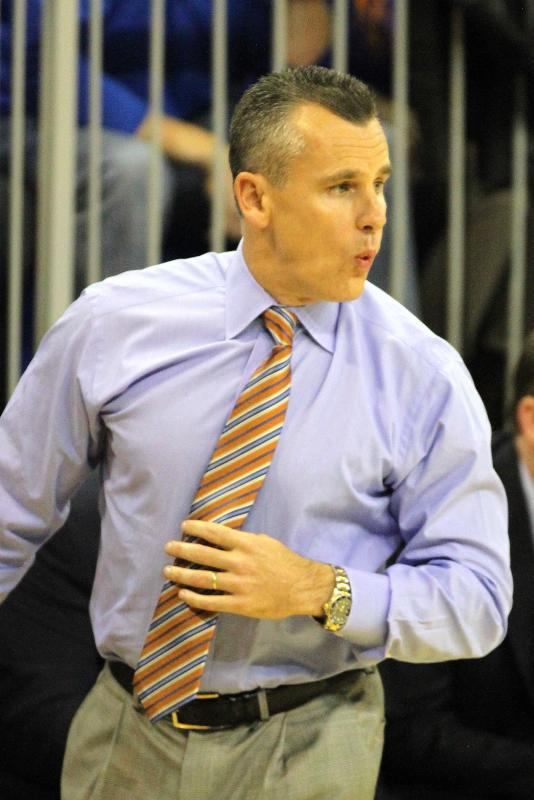
- Donovan in 2014

San Antonio Spurs
- Title: Lead Assistant Coach
- League: NBA

Personal information
- Born: May 30, 1965 (age 61) Rockville Centre, New York, U.S.
- Listed height: 5 ft 11 in (1.80 m)
- Listed weight: 171 lb (78 kg)

Career information
- High school: Saint Agnes (Rockville Centre, New York)
- College: Providence (1983–1987)
- NBA draft: 1987: 3rd round, 68th overall pick
- Drafted by: Utah Jazz
- Playing career: 1987–1989
- Position: Point guard
- Number: 1
- Coaching career: 1989–present

Career history

Playing
- 1987: Wyoming Wildcatters
- 1987–1988: New York Knicks
- 1988–1989: Rapid City Thrillers

Coaching
- 1989–1994: Kentucky (assistant)
- 1994–1996: Marshall
- 1996–2015: Florida
- 2015–2020: Oklahoma City Thunder
- 2020–2026: Chicago Bulls
- 2026—present: San Antonio Spurs (lead assistant)

Career highlights
- As player: First-team All-Big East (1987); Third-team All-Big East (1986); As head coach: 2× NCAA Division I tournament champion (2006, 2007); 4× NCAA Division I regional champion – Final Four (2000, 2006, 2007, 2014); 4× SEC tournament champion (2005–2007, 2014); 6× SEC regular season champion (2000, 2001, 2007, 2011, 2013, 2014); NBCA co-Coach of the Year (2020); John R. Wooden Legends of Coaching Award (2010); Amos Alonzo Stagg Coaching Award (2006); 3× SEC Coach of the Year (2011, 2013, 2014); SoCon Coach of the Year (1995)

Career statistics
- Points: 105 (2.4 ppg)
- Assists: 87 (2.0 apg)
- Steals: 16 (0.4 spg)
- Stats at NBA.com
- Stats at Basketball Reference
- Basketball Hall of Fame
Medals
Men's basketball
Head coach for United States
FIBA Americas U18 Championship
Gold medal – first place	2012 Brazil	National team
Gold medal – first place	2014 United States	National team
FIBA World U19 Cup
Gold medal – first place	2013 Czech Republic	National team

William John Donovan Jr. (born May 30, 1965) is an American professional basketball coach and former player who is the lead assistant coach for the San Antonio Spurs of the National Basketball Association (NBA). He most recently was the head coach of the Chicago Bulls of the National Basketball Association (NBA). Before moving to the NBA, he served as the head basketball coach at the University of Florida from 1996 to 2015, and led his Florida Gator teams to back-to-back NCAA championships in 2006 and 2007, as well as an NCAA championship appearance in 2000. He was inducted into the Naismith Memorial Basketball Hall of Fame as a coach in 2025.

Donovan was born and raised in Rockville Centre on Long Island, New York, where he played basketball at St. Agnes Cathedral High School. He was the starting point guard for Rick Pitino's Providence College squad and led the Friars to the 1987 Final Four. As such, he is one of only four men (Dean Smith, Joe B. Hall and Bobby Knight being the others) to appear in the NCAA Final Four as a player and win the NCAA national championship as a coach. After college, Donovan spent the 1987–88 and 1988–89 basketball seasons split between the developmental Continental Basketball Association and the NBA's New York Knicks, who were led by his former college coach, Rick Pitino.

Donovan ended his professional basketball career in 1989 and briefly worked as a Wall Street stock broker before following Pitino to his new job at the University of Kentucky. Donovan served as an assistant coach for the Kentucky Wildcats men's basketball from 1989 to 1993, working his way from an unpaid graduate assistant to top assistant coach and lead recruiter under Pitino. He accepted his first head coaching position at Marshall University in 1994 and led the Thundering Herd to a 35–20 record over two seasons. Donovan was hired to revive Florida's basketball program in 1996. After two losing seasons, while he rebuilt the roster with a national recruiting effort, Donovan's Gators began a streak of sixteen straight 20-win seasons, a period in which his teams appeared in four Final Fours and won two NCAA championships. He is the winningest coach in program history, and he led his teams to more NCAA tournament appearances, NCAA tournament wins, and Southeastern Conference (SEC) championships than all of Florida's other basketball coaches combined.

During Donovan's 19 years at Florida, he was often rumored to be a candidate for various NCAA and NBA head coaching positions. In June 2007, after leading the Gators to their second consecutive national title, he accepted an offer to become the head coach of the NBA's Orlando Magic. However, he immediately had second thoughts, and after a week, he persuaded the Magic to release him from his newly signed contract and allow him to return to Florida, where he remained for eight more seasons, and wouldn't make an NBA return until 2015.

After 19 years at Florida, Donovan accepted an offer to coach the NBA's Oklahoma City Thunder in April 2015. In his first season with the team, the Thunder were division winners and reached the conference finals, where they lost to the Golden State Warriors in seven games after building a 3–1 series lead. In subsequent seasons under Donovan, the Thunder finished with winning records and never missed the playoffs but were unable to progress past the first round. He was named the NBA Coach's Association Coach of the Year after the 2019–20 season, but after a discussion with the Thunder front office regarding the "future direction of the team", he left by mutual agreement and accepted an offer to coach the Chicago Bulls in September 2020.

== Early life ==
Donovan was born and raised in Rockville Centre on Long Island, New York along with an older sister, Margaret by his parents, Bill Donovan Sr. and Joan Donovan. Bill Donovan Sr. was the third leading scorer in the history of the Boston College Eagles men's basketball program when he graduated in 1962, and he sometimes coached his only son's youth basketball teams, while working in the textile industry. Billy Donovan Jr. attended St. Agnes Cathedral High School in Rockville Centre, where he played basketball under coach Frank Morris. Donovan was described as a "gym rat" who would play basketball as often as possible, even sneaking into his high school gymnasium late at night to practice. With Donovan starting at point guard, St. Agnes won the Long Island Catholic High School Championship during his senior year.

== Playing career ==
=== Providence College ===
After graduating from high school, Donovan accepted an athletic scholarship to Providence College in Providence, Rhode Island. The Providence Friars played a slow tempo game under head coach Joe Mullaney and did not utilize many substitutions, so Donovan averaged less than five minutes of playing time and three points per game during his first two seasons on the team.

Mullaney retired in 1985 and was replaced by New York Knicks assistant Rick Pitino. Pitino scheduled introductory meetings with the players, during which Donovan informed him that he wanted to transfer to Fairfield or Northeastern, both smaller schools where he might get more playing time. However, when Pitino called the coaches of those two schools on his player's behalf, neither was interested in allocating a scholarship to an inexperienced player with little obvious potential. So Pitino advised Donovan to stay at Providence and get in much better physical shape so he could compete for a roster spot the following season.

Donovan followed Pitino's advice and was named the Friars's starting point guard during his junior year. He flourished in Pitino's system, which emphasized the new three-point shot on offense and an aggressive full-court press defense. Donovan averaged 15.1 points per game as a junior, when he was nicknamed "Billy the Kid" by Providence fans after the 19th-century outlaw. During his senior year, he averaged over 20 points and 7 assists per game and led the sixth-seeded Friars to the 1987 Final Four, while earning Southeast Regional Most Valuable Player honors. Donovan was also named to the 1987 All-Big East first team, the 1987 Big East All-Tournament team, and was an honorable mention All-American. Pitino would later say, "I've never in my life had anyone work as hard to improve as (Donovan)."

=== Professional career ===
Donovan was drafted by the Utah Jazz in the third round (68th overall) of the 1987 NBA draft, but was waived before the regular season began. He signed with the Wyoming Wildcatters of the Continental Basketball Association, hoping for another chance to play in the NBA. Pitino left Providence after the team's Final Four run and returned to New York as the head coach of the New York Knicks. In December 1987, Donovan was reunited with his college coach when the Knicks signed him to a one-year contract. He served as a reserve guard for the remainder of the 1987–88 season and averaged 2.4 points and 2.0 assists over 44 games.

The Knicks waived Donovan in March 1988. He did not make an NBA roster during the 1988–89 preseason, so he returned to the CBA, averaging 10.1 points per game with the Rapid City Thrillers.

== Before coaching ==
Donovan had not received another NBA offer by the end of 1988 and came to the conclusion that he did not have a long-term future as a professional basketball player. He left the CBA in January 1989 and took a job with a Wall Street investment banking firm. Donovan was "miserable" during his brief stint as a stock broker, and he especially hated the required cold-call stock sales. After just a few weeks at the firm, he called Pitino to seek advice about becoming a basketball coach. Donovan had not been a vocal leader as a player, and Pitino doubted if he had the necessary communication skills required for coaching, so he suggested that Donovan give the financial sector more of a chance before rushing to change careers.

Donovan called Pitino again in April 1989 to reaffirm his interest in coaching basketball. At the time, Pitino was in the process of leaving the Knicks to become the head coach at the University of Kentucky, and he agreed to bring along Donovan as a graduate assistant to see if he had a future in coaching.

== Collegiate coaching career ==
=== Kentucky assistant (1989–94) ===
Pitino was tasked with rebuilding a Kentucky basketball program which had been devastated by sanctions levied by the NCAA due to earlier rules violations. The Wildcats quickly returned to national prominence, and Donovan's coaching career progressed quickly as well. After one season as a graduate assistant, he was promoted to assistant coach in 1990 and to associate head coach in 1992. In that position, Donovan served as Pitino's top assistant during Kentucky's 1993 Final Four run, and he helped to recruit the members of UK's 1996 national championship team.

=== Marshall University (1994–96) ===
Donovan's association with Kentucky's success plus Pitino's recommendation earned him an offer to become the head basketball coach at Marshall University, where the Thundering Herd had struggled to a 9–18 record during the 1993–94 season. Donovan accepted the offer, making him (at 28 years old) the youngest head basketball coach in NCAA Division I.

At Marshall, Donovan installed the fast-paced offense and defensive schemes employed by Pitino. A previously scheduled early season match-up pitted Marshall against Kentucky in December 1994. Before the game, Pitino advised his young protege to "try to whip Kentucky's ass, because we'll try to do the same to you." Though he was warmly received by the Rupp Arena crowd, Donovan's team did not feel as welcome, losing 116–75. The rest of the season was more successful. Donovan's first Marshall squad doubled its win total from the previous year, earning an 18–9 record and winning the Southern Conference North Division title as Donovan was named the 1995 Southern Conference Coach of the Year. In Donovan's second season, 1995–96, the team went 17–11 and led the Southern Conference in scoring and three-point field goals. Donovan was also successful on the recruiting trail, convincing nationally sought prep star Jason Williams to decline scholarship offers from more established programs and remain in state to attend Marshall. Williams would later follow Donovan to Florida.

In all, Donovan's Marshall teams compiled a 35–20 record over two seasons.

=== University of Florida (1996–2015) ===
In March 1996, University of Florida basketball coach Lon Kruger resigned to take the same position at the University of Illinois. The Florida basketball program had only fleeting success over its history, and although the Gators reached their first Final Four under Kruger in 1994, his teams slipped back to mediocre levels. Florida athletic director Jeremy Foley sought a "young, energetic, and enthusiastic" coach to bring sustained success, and after a wide-ranging search, he decided that 30-year-old Billy Donovan was the best fit. To assure Donovan that he would be given enough time to build up the program, Foley offered him a six-year contract.

With few talented players on the roster, Donovan's first two Florida squads had records of 13–17 and 15–16. There were some signs of improvement, however, as the 1997–98 team was invited to the National Invitation Tournament (NIT), and Donovan's "relentless" recruiting during this period set the foundation for future success.

Donovan finally brought lasting success to the Florida basketball program during the 1998–99 season. The Gators went 22–9, earning 20+ wins for only the fifth time in history and starting a streak of 16 consecutive 20-win seasons. The Gators continued to play well in the 1999 postseason, as they made their third NCAA Sweet Sixteen appearance and became the second squad in school history to appear in the final top 25 polls (No. 17 in the ESPN/USA Today Poll and No. 23 in the Associated Press Poll).

The 1999–2000 season saw Donovan lead the Gators to their first regular season SEC Championship and their second NCAA final Four appearance, defeating North Carolina in the national semi-finals before falling to Michigan State in the NCAA championship game.

The Gators again won the SEC regular season championship during the 2000–01 season, and on February 3, 2003, the team achieved a No. 1 ranking in the ESPN/USA Today poll for the first time in school history, returning there the following season on December 8, 2003. The 2004–05 season was highlighted by Florida defeating Kentucky 70–53 to win the SEC tournament championship, the first time that the Gators won the conference tournament.

While successful during the regular season, Donovan's Florida squads from 2001 to 2005 consistently underperformed in the NCAA tournament, losing to lower-seeded teams in the first or second round every year despite rosters stocked with highly recruited players. Still in his thirties, some commentators speculated that Donovan was an excellent recruiter who was unable to make in-game adjustments or develop talented players once they were on the UF campus.

==== Back-to-back national championships ====
In the 2005–06 season, Donovan's sophomore-led Gator squad posted the school's best-ever win streak to start a season, reeling off 17 straight wins and reaching No. 2 in the nation in the AP Poll. However, the team failed to reach the top spot as they lost their first SEC game of the season to the Tennessee Volunteers. This loss was followed by a surprising season sweep at the hands of the eventual 2006 National Invitation Tournament champion South Carolina Gamecocks as Florida posted a 10–6 conference record, good for second place in the SEC Eastern Division.

Donovan's young Gator squad would come together in the postseason. Florida reached the SEC Tournament championship and avenged their surprising regular season defeats by beating South Carolina in the finals, earning the school's second conference tournament title. In the 2006 NCAA tournament, the 3rd-seeded Gators finally reached the Sweet 16 and beyond. They defeated Villanova (who had knocked them out the tournament the previous season) to reach the Final Four, and in the championship game, they defeated UCLA 73–57 to win the school's first NCAA basketball title.

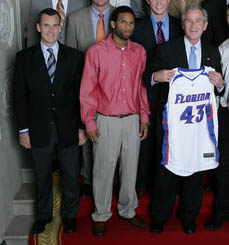
Billy Donovan, left, and the 2006–07 Gators, with U.S. President George W. Bush at the White House in 2007.

During a post-championship celebration in the O'Connell Center, the Gators' entire starting five of (Lee Humphrey, Joakim Noah, Al Horford, Corey Brewer, and Taurean Green) announced they would return the following year and attempt to win another championship (the last back-to-back title winner was 1991 and 1992 Duke) instead of declaring early for the NBA draft. Accordingly, the Gators were named preseason favorites to repeat by many media pundits. The Gators raced out of the gates, losing just two non-conference games (versus Kansas and at Florida State). On December 20, 2006, Donovan became the winningest basketball coach in Florida history, earning his 236th win to surpass Norm Sloan's total. The 2007 Gators looked even more mature in terms of their unselfishness, passing and shooting abilities and overall team play. Although the Gators sputtered down the stretch during SEC play, losing three of four games beginning with a loss at Vanderbilt, the team rebounded with its sixth consecutive win over its archrivals, the Kentucky Wildcats, to regain momentum and claim the SEC regular season championship. The Gators then repeated as SEC Tournament champions with dominating performances that culminated in a win over the Arkansas Razorbacks in the finals.

Florida earned the number one overall seed in the 2007 NCAA tournament and defeated Jackson State, Purdue, Butler and Oregon to reach the Final Four. The semi-final was a rematch of the 2006 title game against UCLA, and Donovan's Gators prevailed 76–66. The Gators secured their repeat championship two nights later with an emphatic 84–75 victory over the Ohio State Buckeyes, coached by Thad Matta. With the Florida Gators football having won the 2007 BCS National Championship Game (also over Ohio State) three months prior, the University of Florida became the first school in NCAA history to hold both the football and basketball national championships at the same time.

Donovan's first decade in Gainesville brought a new level of success to the University of Florida's basketball program. The Gators were invited to the NCAA Tournament in every season between 1999 and 2007 (a streak of nine straight appearances), reached three national championship games, and won two NCAA titles. In contrast, Florida basketball squads had only appeared in five NCAA Tournaments in 81 years of play before Donovan's arrival and had never reached an NCAA championship game. In conference play, Florida had captured only one regular season SEC championship and had never won the conference tournament before Donovan's arrival. From 1996 until 2007, the Gators won three SEC regular season titles and three SEC tournament titles.

After announcing his return to Gainesville, Donovan signed the top-ranked 2007 recruiting class, as rated by Rivals.com.

Despite the loss of all five starters from the previous year, the Gators surprised many pundits with Donovan's tenth straight twenty-win season. However, after an 18–3 start, the team struggled during the final third of the season, winning just three of its last eleven games and snapping the Gators' nine-year streak of NCAA tournament invitations. The young Gator team rebounded to reach the semifinals of the 2008 National Invitation Tournament (NIT) before falling to the UMass Minutemen.

The 2008–09 Gators started out the season ranked No. 19 and 5–0 before falling to Syracuse. A loss two weeks later to the Florida State Seminoles knocked the Gators out of the top twenty-five ranked teams. Though the team won twenty-two regular season games, it once again was not enough to earn a bid to the NCAA tournament. However, the Gators were given a number one seed in the 2009 NIT, where they lost to the Penn State Nittany Lions in the quarterfinals.

The Gators returned to the NCAA tournament during the 2009–10 season, but lost in the first round to the BYU Cougars in double overtime. During the season, Florida defeated Florida State, ending a three-game losing streak to the Seminoles. They also defeated Michigan State, a preseason favorite to win the NCAA tournament and an eventual Final Four team, en route to winning the 2009 Legends Classic tournament.

With three returning senior starters, the 2010–11 Gators posted an improved record. They won the SEC regular season title, and were the runners-up in the 2011 SEC Tournament. In the 2011 NCAA Tournament, the Gators defeated the Jimmer Fredette-led BYU Cougars, before losing in overtime to the Butler Bulldogs in the Elite Eight.

On March 8, 2011, Donovan was named the 2011 SEC Coach of the Year. Despite appearing in three national title games and winning two national titles, it was Donovan's first time winning the award. Gators forward Chandler Parsons also became the first Gator to ever win SEC Player of the Year honors.

The 2011–12 Gators were again invited to the NCAA Tournament, this time as a seventh-seed. They defeated the tenth-seeded Virginia Cavaliers and fifteenth-seeded Norfolk State (who had beaten second-seeded Missouri) to advance to the Sweet Sixteen, then defeated Marquette 68–58 to return to the Elite Eight for the second straight year. In the Elite Eight, Donovan and the Gators faced off against Louisville and Donovan's former coach Pitino. The Gators fell in a very close game, 72–68.

Donovan recorded his 400th career victory at the University of Florida on January 19, 2013, with an 83–52 win over the Missouri Tigers. The Gators won the 2013 SEC regular season championship (Donovan's fifth regular season conference championship), finished as runner-up in the 2013 SEC Tournament (losing to Ole Miss in the championship game), and advanced to a third consecutive Elite Eight (defeating Northwestern State in the second round, Minnesota in the third round, and Florida Gulf Coast in the Sweet Sixteen, before losing to Michigan in the regional final).

==== 2013–14 ====
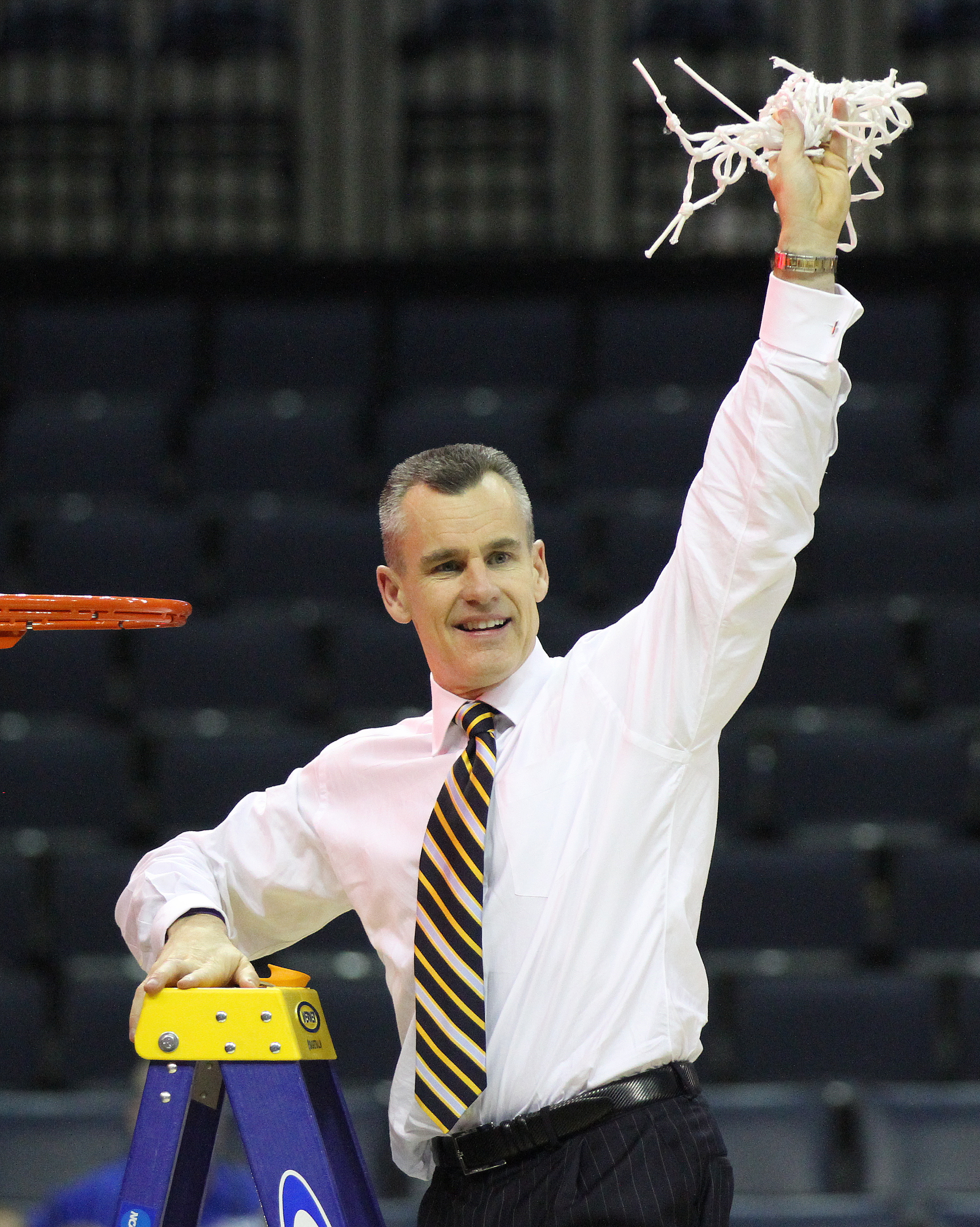
Donovan cutting down the nets after the Gators beat Dayton in the Elite Eight

Donovan's 2013–14 squad started the year with several players injured or suspended and faced one of the most challenging non-conference schedules in college basketball. Florida dropped two close road games to ranked teams and entered the conference portion of their schedule with an 11–2 record and a No. 10 national ranking. The Gators would not lose again during the regular season, becoming the first team in SEC history to finish with an 18–0 conference record, while also setting numerous school records. Florida then won the 2014 SEC men's basketball tournament to run their overall record against SEC opponents to 21–0.

The SEC regular season championship was the third in four seasons for Donovan's Gators, and their conference tournament championship was their fourth in school history, all coming under Donovan. He was named the SEC's Coach of the Year for the third time, and his players won many of the conference's individual awards. Senior point guard Scottie Wilbekin was named Southeastern Conference Men's Basketball Player of the Year and the SEC Tournament MVP, senior center Patric Young was named the Defensive Player and Scholar-Athlete of the Year, junior forward Dorian Finney-Smith was named Sixth Man of the Year, and senior guard Casey Prather was named to the All-SEC First Team.

The Gators earned the number one overall seed in the 2014 NCAA tournament, and their winning streak stretched to 30 games as they reached the Final Four by defeating each of their first four tournament opponents by double digit margins. However, the Gators' season ended with a national semifinal loss to the 7-seed and eventual national champion UConn Huskies, who had been the last team to beat Florida the previous December.

==== 2014–15 ====
On February 28, 2015, Donovan became the second youngest coach in NCAA Division I history to earn 500 career wins, accomplishing the feat in the Florida Gators' 66–49 victory over the Tennessee Volunteers. Donovan joined Bob Knight as the only coaches to reach 500 wins before turning 50 years old. However, his Gator squad finished the season with a 16–17 record, ending the Gators' winning season and 20-win season streaks at 16 years apiece.

In 18 years at Florida, Donovan led the Gators to 14 NCAA Tournament appearances, six SEC regular season titles (four outright, two shared) and four SEC Tournament titles. By comparison, the Gators had only made three "official" NCAA Tournament appearances (not counting two under Sloan which were vacated), one regular season conference title, and no tournament titles in their entire history before Donovan's arrival.

== Professional coaching career ==
=== Orlando Magic (June 2007) ===
During Florida's national championship runs, rumors abounded that Donovan was considering an offer to become the head coach at the University of Kentucky. He later said that, while UK may have had some interest, he "never had any official contact with Kentucky." After winning the 2007 national championship, Donovan announced that he had no plans to leave Florida for another college job and was working on a contract extension with UF.

However, in late May, the NBA's Orlando Magic offered Donovan their head coaching job to replace Brian Hill, who had been fired after two consecutive losing seasons. Donovan struggled with the decision until June 1, 2007, when he agreed to accept the Orlando Magic's contract offer, reportedly worth $27.5 million over five years. Florida athletic director Jeremy Foley contacted Anthony Grant, Donovan's former assistant who was the head coach at Virginia Commonwealth University at the time, to inquire about his interest in replacing Donovan.

Donovan held an introductory press conference in Orlando on June 1, 2007, followed by an emotional farewell press conference in Gainesville later that day. The next morning Donovan began having second thoughts about his decision, and informed Jeremy Foley and the Magic front office that he had changed his mind about leaving Florida. After failing to convince Donovan to still change teams, the Magic reached an agreement with Donovan on June 6, 2007, releasing him from his contract, thereby leaving him free to return as the head coach of the Florida Gators basketball team. As a stipulation of his release, he reportedly agreed not to coach in the NBA for the following five seasons. Donovan issued apologies to all involved parties, and the Orlando Magic soon after hired Stan Van Gundy as their head coach.

=== Oklahoma City Thunder (2015–2020) ===
On April 30, 2015, Donovan was named the head coach of the Oklahoma City Thunder, reportedly agreeing to a five-year deal worth nearly $30 million, replacing Scott Brooks who previously coached the Thunder for seven seasons.

On September 8, 2020, it was announced that Donovan would not be returning to the team as the two sides failed to agree on a contract extension. Over his five seasons in Oklahoma City, Donovan went 243–157, while making the postseason each year, advancing past the first round just once.

=== Chicago Bulls (2020–2026) ===
On September 22, 2020, the Chicago Bulls hired Donovan as their new head coach with a four-year deal worth a reported $24 million. Donovan got his first win as the Bulls coach on December 29, beating the Washington Wizards 115–107.

On July 27, 2025, Donovan and the Bulls agreed to a multiyear contract extension.

On April 21, 2026, Donovan stepped down as the Bulls' coach. Donovan's record with the Bulls was 226–256. The 226 wins rank fourth most in Chicago history. With the Bulls, Donovan only finished with a winning record once (46–36 in 2021–22) and only once made the playoffs. They qualified for the NBA's play-in tournament in 2023, 2024, and 2025.

=== San Antonio Spurs (2026–present) ===
On July 2, 2026, the San Antonio Spurs hired Donovan to serve as the team's lead assistant coach under head coach Mitch Johnson.

== National team career ==
Donovan has been chosen to be a head coach for USA Basketball on three occasions. He coached the 2012 U18 team to the 2012 FIBA Americas Under-18 Championship, going 5–0 in the tournament. He then led many of the same players to the 2013 FIBA Under-19 World Championship, going 9–0 in that tournament. The following summer, he again coached the US team at the 2014 FIBA Americas Under-18 Championship and again led them to the tournament championship with another 5–0 record.

Some commentators have opined that Donovan should have succeeded Mike Krzyzewski as the head coach of the United States men's national basketball team at the 2020 Summer Olympics.

== Awards ==
The United States Sports Academy presented Donovan with the Amos Alonzo Stagg Award in 2006. Donovan was the recipient of the John R. Wooden Award's "Legends of Coaching Award" in 2010. Donovan was recognized by his peers as the SEC Coach of the Year in 2011, 2013 and 2014.

Donovan was selected to the Naismith Memorial Basketball Hall of Fame as part of the 2025 class, which also included Carmelo Anthony, Micky Arison, Sue Bird, Danny Crawford, Dwight Howard, Sylvia Fowles, Maya Moore and the 2008 Men's United States Olympic Basketball Team. Donovan chose Maurice Cheeks and Rick Pitino as his inductors.

== Personal life ==
Donovan married Christine Hasbrouck (née D'Auria, b. 1964) on August 5, 1989. She is the daughter of Anthony J. D'Auria and Patricia Ann Connor D'Auria, and a descendant of the Hasbrouck family. The Donovans have four children: Connor, Bryan, Hasbrouck Anne and William Donovan III, who transferred to Florida from Catholic University and walked on to his father's team as a reserve guard. A fifth child, Jacqueline, was delivered stillborn in 2000, prompting Donovan to become involved in several children's charities and to help raise funds for a children's hospital in Gainesville. Similar tragedies struck the families of Pitino and former assistant coaches Anthony Grant and John Pelphrey, forging a closer bond between them.

Donovan's parents bought a home in Gainesville in 1996, and Bill Donovan Sr. was a fixture at most Gator games and practices during the remainder of his son's Florida coaching tenure.

Donovan is a Catholic. He has been described as politically conservative by some of his players and in the media. He is a registered independent.

== Philanthropy ==
In October 2008, coach Donovan and then-head Florida Gators football coach Urban Meyer were named co-chairmen of an effort to raise $50 million to support the Florida Opportunity Scholars Program. The Florida Opportunity Scholars Program was created by University of Florida President Bernie Machen in 2006, and is intended to increase the opportunities for academically prepared first-generation students who have experience significantly different needs and financial challenges.

Donovan was instrumental in fund-raising and pushing for the development of a Catholic high school in Gainesville, which did not have a Catholic secondary school when Donovan arrived at the University of Florida in 1996. St. Francis High School opened in 2004 and expanded in 2008 with much help from Donovan; his children attended the school.

== NBA career statistics ==
Legend
GP	Games played	GS	Games started	MPG	Minutes per game
FG%	Field goal percentage	3P%	3-point field goal percentage	FT%	Free throw percentage
RPG	Rebounds per game	APG	Assists per game	SPG	Steals per game
BPG	Blocks per game	PPG	Points per game	**Bold**	Career high

Year	Team	GP	GS	MPG	FG%	3P%	FT%	RPG	APG	SPG	BPG	PPG
1987–88	New York	44	0	8.3	.404	.000	.810	.6	2.0	.4	.0	2.4
Career		44	0	8.3	.404	.000	.810	.6	2.0	.4	.0	2.4

== Head coaching record ==
=== College ===
Record table
Season	Team	Overall	Conference	Standing	Postseason
**Marshall Thundering Herd** (Southern Conference) (1994–1996)
1994–95	Marshall	18–9	10–4	1st (North)	
1995–96	Marshall	17–11	8–6	3rd (North)	
Marshall:		35–20 (.636)	18–10 (.643)		
**Florida Gators** (Southeastern Conference) (1996–2015)
1996–97	Florida	13–17	5–11	5th (East)	
1997–98	Florida	14–15	6–10	6th (East)	NIT First Round
1998–99	Florida	22–9	10–6	3rd (East)	NCAA Division I Sweet 16
1999–00	Florida	29–8	12–4	T–1st (East)	NCAA Division I Runner-Up
2000–01	Florida	24–7	12–4	T–1st (East)	NCAA Division I Second Round
2001–02	Florida	22–9	10–6	T–1st (East)	NCAA Division I First Round
2002–03	Florida	25–8	12–4	2nd (East)	NCAA Division I Second Round
2003–04	Florida	20–11	9–7	2nd (East)	NCAA Division I First Round
2004–05	Florida	24–8	12–4	2nd (East)	NCAA Division I Second Round
2005–06	Florida	33–6	10–6	2nd (East)	NCAA Division I Champion
2006–07	Florida	35–5	13–3	1st (East)	NCAA Division I Champion
2007–08	Florida	24–12	8–8	4th (East)	NIT Semifinal
2008–09	Florida	25–11	9–7	3rd (East)	NIT Quarterfinal
2009–10	Florida	21–13	9–7	4th (East)	NCAA Division I First Round
2010–11	Florida	29–8	13–3	1st (East)	NCAA Division I Elite Eight
2011–12	Florida	26–11	10–6	T–2nd	NCAA Division I Elite Eight
2012–13	Florida	29–8	14–4	1st	NCAA Division I Elite Eight
2013–14	Florida	36–3	18–0	1st	NCAA Division I Final Four
2014–15	Florida	16–17	8–10	T–8th	
Florida:		467–186 (.715)	200–110 (.645)		
Total:		502–206 (.709)			
National champion Postseason invitational champion Conference regular season champion Conference regular season and conference tournament champion Division regular season champion Division regular season and conference tournament champion Conference tournament champion

=== NBA ===
Legend
Regular season	G	Games coached	W	Games won	L	Games lost	W–L %	Win–loss %
Playoffs	PG	Playoff games	PW	Playoff wins	PL	Playoff losses	PW–L %	Playoff win–loss %

Team	Year	G	W	L	W–L%	Finish	PG	PW	PL	PW–L%	Result
Oklahoma City	2015–16	82	55	27	.671	1st in Northwest	18	11	7	.611	Lost in conference finals
Oklahoma City	2016–17	82	47	35	.573	2nd in Northwest	5	1	4	.200	Lost in first round
Oklahoma City	2017–18	82	48	34	.585	2nd in Northwest	6	2	4	.333	Lost in first round
Oklahoma City	2018–19	82	49	33	.598	4th in Northwest	5	1	4	.200	Lost in first round
Oklahoma City	2019–20	72	44	28	.611	2nd in Northwest	7	3	4	.429	Lost in first round
Chicago	2020–21	72	31	41	.431	3rd in Central	—	—	—	—	Missed playoffs
Chicago	2021–22	82	46	36	.561	2nd in Central	5	1	4	.200	Lost in first round
Chicago	2022–23	82	40	42	.488	3rd in Central	—	—	—	—	Missed playoffs
Chicago	2023–24	82	39	43	.476	4th in Central	—	—	—	—	Missed playoffs
Chicago	2024–25	82	39	43	.476	5th in Central	—	—	—	—	Missed playoffs
Chicago	2025–26	82	31	51	.378	4th in Central	—	—	—	—	Missed playoffs
Career		882	469	413	.532		46	19	27	.413	

== See also ==
- Florida Gators
- History of the University of Florida
- List of NCAA Division I men's basketball tournament Final Four appearances by coach
- List of Providence College alumni
- Marshall Thundering Herd
- Providence Friars
- University of Florida Athletic Association
