= SFCA =

SFCA may refer to:

- Saint Francis Catholic Academy, a private school in Florida
- San Francisco
- Southeastern Film Critics Association
- Science Fiction Comics Association
- Société Française de Construction Aéronautique
- Surfactant-Free Cellulose Acetate
