= Kent Fuchs =

American electrical engineer

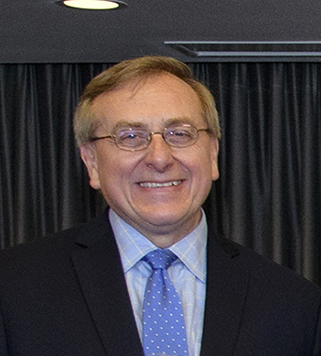
- Fuchs at 2017 National Science Board

12th President of the University of Florida
- Interim; August 1, 2024 – August 31, 2025
- Preceded by: Ben Sasse
- Succeeded by: Donald Landry
- In office January 1, 2015 – February 6, 2023
- Preceded by: Bernie Machen
- Succeeded by: Ben Sasse

15th Provost of Cornell University
- In office January 1, 2009 – November 14, 2014
- Preceded by: Carolyn Martin
- Succeeded by: Michael I. Kotlikoff

Personal details
- Born: Wesley Kent Fuchs; November 3, 1954 (age 71) Oklahoma, U.S.
- Spouse: Linda Moskeland
- Children: 4
- Education: Duke University (BS); University of Illinois, Urbana-Champaign (MS, PhD); Trinity International University (MDiv)
- Scientific career
- Fields: Electrical engineering
- Workplaces: University of Illinois, Urbana-Champaign; Purdue University; Cornell University
- Thesis: Concurrent error detection in vlsi systems through structure encoding (fault tolerance, self-checking) (1985)
- Doctoral advisor: Jacob A. Abraham

Wesley Kent Fuchs (/fɒks/; born 1954) is an American electrical engineer who served as the 12th president of the University of Florida from January 2015 to February 2023, and again as interim president from August 2024 to August 2025.

Fuchs served as the 15th provost of Cornell University from January 2009 to November 2014, and as dean of the Cornell University College of Engineering from 2002 to 2008.

== Education ==
Fuchs received a Bachelor of Science in Engineering from Duke University in North Carolina in 1977, a Master of Science from the University of Illinois Urbana-Champaign in 1982, a Master of Divinity from Trinity Evangelical Divinity School in Illinois in 1984, and a Doctor of Philosophy in electrical and communications engineering from the University of Illinois Urbana-Champaign in 1985.

== Career ==
Fuchs was a professor in the electrical and computer engineering department and the coordinated science laboratory at the University of Illinois Urbana-Champaign, from 1985 to 1996. He was head of the school of electrical and computer engineering at Purdue University from 1996 to 2002. While at Purdue he was appointed to the Michael J. and Katherine R. Birck distinguished professorship.

=== Cornell University ===
Fuchs was the Joseph Silbert dean of the Cornell University College of Engineering from 2002 to 2008.

In October 2008, Fuchs was appointed the 15th provost of Cornell University. In 2011, he led in the team and strategy that resulted in the winning proposal, in partnership with the Technion and New York City, to create a new graduate applied sciences campus on Roosevelt Island in New York City. The Cornell Tech campus reported to him as provost. In 2009, Fuchs launched Cornell's re-imagining initiative that resulted in enhanced efficiency in administrative services. As provost, Fuchs was also responsible for transforming Cornell's budget model. In 2010, he led the development of Cornell's Strategic Plan and the establishment of metrics for assessing Cornell's academic stature.

=== University of Florida ===
He served as the 12th president of the University of Florida from 2015 to 2023. As the president of the university, Fuchs barred three professors from testifying in a voting rights lawsuit against Florida governor Ron DeSantis over Senate Bill 90. After the university blocked its professors from providing testimony in court, the University of Florida's accreditor started an investigation into the university.

In January 2022, Fuchs announced that he would step down as president of the University of Florida, though he might stay at the university and return to the faculty. He was succeeded by Ben Sasse, a former U.S. senator from Nebraska. After Sasse resigned on July 31, 2024, Fuchs returned as interim president on August 1, 2024 through August 30, 2025.

== Social engagement ==
On September 16, 2016, United States president Barack Obama announced his intent to nominate Fuchs as a member of the National Science Board and the National Science Foundation. He was a member of the board's class of 2016–2022.

== Personal life ==
Fuchs is married to Linda Moskeland Fuchs, who previously taught at The King's Academy in the city of West Palm Beach, Florida. They have four children, two daughters-in-law, a son-in-law and three grandchildren.

== See also ==
- List of Duke University people
- List of University of Florida presidents
- List of University of Illinois at Urbana–Champaign people

Academic offices
Preceded by Carolyn Martin	Provost of Cornell University; 2009–2014	Succeeded by Michael Kotlikoff
Preceded by Bernie Machen	President of the University of Florida; 2015–2023	Succeeded by Ben Sasse
Preceded by Ben Sasse	Interim President of the University of Florida; 2024–2025	Succeeded by Donald Landry; Interim
