= The Saint Agnes School =

The St. Agnes School

Location
- 70 Clinton Avenue; Rockville Centre, New York 11570; United States; 40°39′36″N 73°38′51″W

Information
- Type: Private, day school
- Religious affiliation: Catholic
- Established: 1917; 109 years ago
- Founder: Monsignor Peter Quealy
- Grades: K-8
- Gender: co-educational
- Campus type: Suburban
- Colors: Green and Gold
- Athletics: 8 teams
- Team name: Stags
- Rival: Kellenberg Latin School
- Accreditation: Middle States Association of Colleges and Schools
- Publication: Primary Prints (lower school journal for grades 1-3), Stuck In The Middle (lower school journal for grades 4-6)
- Newspaper: Green & Gold Gazette
- Affiliation: New York State Association of Independent Schools
- Website: www.stagnes-school.org

St. Agnes Cathedral School, otherwise known as The St. Agnes School, is a K-8 private co-educational Catholic country day school in Rockville Centre, New York, United States. It was founded in 1917 as St. Agnes Elementary School by Monsignor Peter Quealy.

A major portion of the student body reside in Rockville Centre, and neighboring towns. It is joined by a collection of other schools as part of the Diocese of Rockville Centre school system. St. Agnes Cathedral School is the largest elementary school in the Diocese of Rockville Centre. The school resides on campus along with St. Agnes Cathedral, the base of the Diocese of Rockville Centre.

== History ==
Founded in 1917 by Monsignor Peter Quealy, St. Agnes Cathedral School was originally named St. Agnes Elementary School. The ten-room school house had a founding faculty made up of five Dominican Sisters. The school’s first principal was Mother Petra, who served as Principal until her death in 1939. The increasing need for Catholic elementary education in Rockville Centre made the school soon outgrow their ten-room building. This led to the purchase of the Clinton Avenue building from the Rockville Centre Public School District in 1957. The North and South Wings of the school were later added during renovations in the 1960s.

== Facilities ==
The Saint Agnes School is located on the Saint Agnes Complex, which consists of several properties. Saint Agnes' campus includes:

- Recently renovated Science Lab
- Gymnasium
- Melton Auditorium
- 3 Performance Spaces
- 37 Classroom Spaces
- Lecture Space
- Outdoor Playground, Indoor and Outdoor Play Areas and Fields
- SMARTboards in all classrooms for grades K-8
- Library and Virtual Library Access
- Internet Access in all Buildings and Classrooms

== Secondary school placement ==
In recent years, St. Agnes students have scored higher than other local schools on state assessments, receiving average scores no lower than a 97.1. The scores of St. Agnes students to local public districts as well as fellow Diocese of Rockville Centre schools are comparatively higher. Following their graduation from St. Agnes, students in recent years have gone on to attend various secondary schools on Long Island, including: Chaminade High School, Kellenberg Memorial High School, Sacred Heart Academy, Holy Trinity High School, Friends Academy, Long Island Lutheran. In addition, Saint Agnes has also sent several students in recent years to secondary schools in Manhattan, including: The Marymount School, Convent of the Sacred Heart, Dominican Academy, Regis High School and Xavier High School.

== Notable alumni ==
- Billy Donovan, 2-time NCAA champion basketball coach, University of Florida
- Joey Heatherton, actress and singer
- Carmen Ortiz, U.S. Attorney for Massachusetts
- Bethenny Frankel, Entrepreneur and Real Housewife of New York City.

== In popular culture ==
The St. Agnes School has appeared in several films that have been filmed in Rockville Centre. Edward Burns has worn a St. Agnes sweatshirt in several of his films.
