= Florida Opportunity Scholars Program =

Need-based scholarship

Machen Florida Opportunity Scholar Program
- Formation: 2006
- Type: Need-based Scholarship
- Headquarters: Gainesville, Florida
- Location: United States
- Director: Leslie H. Pendleton
- Key people: President Bernie Machen
- Website: Official website

Machen Florida Opportunity Scholar Program is a need-based scholarship at the University of Florida. The objective of the scholarship is to retain these particular students and have them graduate at rates equal to or greater than the standard undergraduate population on campus.

== History ==
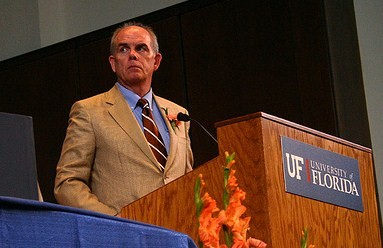
Bernie Machen the founder of the scholarship at the University of Florida.

This program is designed to provide financial support for first-generation, financially disadvantaged students working toward a bachelor's degree. The first need-based scholarship was dispersed in the summer of 2006, and during the 2006-2008 academic years $3.6 million has been given to students at the University of Florida.

In 2008, Coach Urban Meyer and Coach Billy Donovan agreed to lead the charge to raise $50 million to help support and fund this scholarship on campus.

=== Objective ===
This scholarship was designed for First-generation students that have unique needs and financial challenges. The Florida Opportunity Scholars Program was created by President Bernie Machen to increase the opportunities for academically prepared first-generation students to attend the university without having to struggle with financial burdens. For examples:books and fees, meal and housing, transportation, miscellaneous expenses are all covered by this scholarship.

== See also ==
- University of Florida
- Bernie Machen
