= Stuart R. Bell =

American academic

Stuart Bell
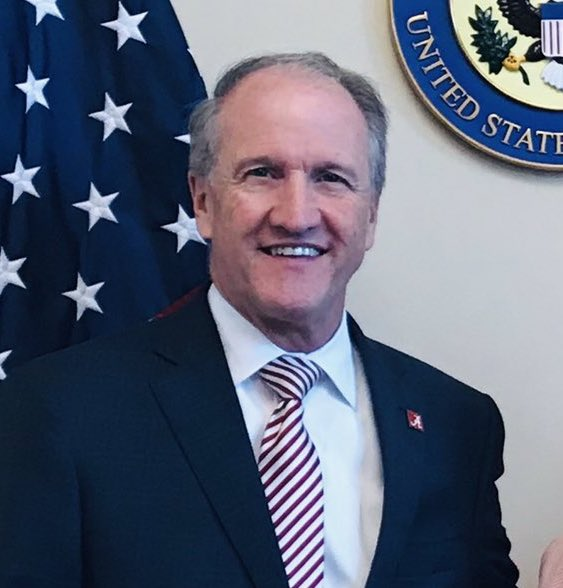
- Bell in May 2019

14th President of the University of Florida
- Incumbent
- Assumed office July 1, 2026
- Preceded by: Donald Landry (interim)

29th President of the University of Alabama
- In office July 15, 2015 – July 21, 2025
- Preceded by: Judy L. Bonner
- Succeeded by: Peter J. Mohler

Personal details
- Born: Stuart Ray Bell; 1957 (age 68–69) Abilene, Texas, U.S.
- Spouse: Susan Bell
- Education: Texas A&M University (BS, MS, PhD)
- Occupation: President of University of Florida

Academic background
- Thesis: Development of a cycle simulation for a coal-fueled, direct-injected, internal combustion engine (alternative fuels) (1986)
- Doctoral advisor: Jerald Caton

Academic work
- Discipline: mechanical engineering
- Institutions: University of Kansas; Louisiana State University; University of Alabama

Stuart Ray Bell (born 1957) is an American academic currently serving as the 14th President of the University of Florida. He served as the 29th president of the University of Alabama from July 2015 through July 2025.

== Early life and education ==
Stuart R. Bell was born in Abilene, Texas, in 1957. He has credited the teachers he had growing up with helping spark his interest in science. He graduated from Texas A&M University in College Station, Texas, where he received a Bachelor of Science degree in nuclear engineering in 1979. He received his master's and doctorate degrees in mechanical engineering from Texas A&M in 1981 and 1986, respectively.

== Career ==
=== Academic and early administrative career ===
Before embarking on his 40-year career as an academic and higher education administrator, Bell briefly worked for ExxonMobil after completing his undergraduate studies at Texas A&M University. There, he designed oil platforms in the Gulf of Mexico. Bell would return to Texas A&M and earn his doctorate in mechanical engineering in 1986.

Bell would first join the University of Alabama in 1986 as an assistant professor in the Department of Mechanical Engineering. He would serve as its head of department from 1995 until 2002.

With research interest in combustion engines, Bell has expertise in alternative fuels for engines, innovative engine designs, and modeling of engine and engine processes. He directed the University of Alabama's Center for Advanced Vehicle Technologies from 1998 to 2002.

Bell was awarded the Society of Automotive Engineers' Ralph Teetor Award for Outstanding Contributions to Research and Teaching in 1988. He was presented the T. Morris Hackney Faculty Leadership Award for the UA College of Engineering in 2001, and, in 2005, he received the Richard S. Woodbury Award from the American Society of Mechanical Engineers.

In 2002, Bell left Alabama for the University of Kansas, where he served as dean of the College of Engineering until 2012. This position would require him to also serve as chief academic officer and administrator at the University of Kansas. From 2012 through 2015, he was executive vice president and provost at Louisiana State University in Baton Rouge, Louisiana. During his tenure at LSU, Bell oversaw the opening of new campus facilities, the expansion of online programs, and the AgCenter's merger with the College of Agriculture.

=== President of the University of Alabama ===
Bell began his tenure as the 29th President of the University of Alabama in July 2015. He succeeded Judy Bonner who served from 2012 until 2015. During his tenure as university president, Bell oversaw the growth of the student body from around 37,000 students to over 40,000 students.

=== President of the University of Florida ===
On May 18, 2026, Bell was named the sole finalist to become the 14th President of the University of Florida. He was unanimously confirmed by the University of Florida Board of Trustees on June 10, 2026. Following a delay in consideration from the Florida Board of Governors, Bell was appointed as Interim President effective June 22, 2026. On July 1, 2026, Bell was confirmed by the Florida Board of Governors to become the 14th President of the University of Florida.

== Personal life ==
He is married to Susan Bell. They have two sons, Stuart and Stephen, and a daughter, Stacy.
