= Windy City Bulls =

American professional basketball team of the NBA G League

- Conference: Eastern
- League: NBA G League
- Founded: 2016
- History: Windy City Bulls; 2016–present
- Arena: Now Arena
- Location: Hoffman Estates, Illinois
- Team colors: Red, black, silver
- President: Brad Seymour
- Team manager: Josh Malone
- Head coach: William Donovan III
- Ownership: Chicago Bulls
- Affiliation: Chicago Bulls
- Website: Official website

The Windy City Bulls are an American professional basketball team in the NBA G League based in Hoffman Estates, Illinois. They are affiliated with the Chicago Bulls, and play their home games at Now Arena. It became the 13th G-League team to be owned by an NBA team.

== History ==
In October 2015, the Chicago Bulls began pursuing an expansion franchise in nearby Hoffman Estates to play in the Sears Centre Arena in time for the 2016–17 season. On November 9, 2015, the Hoffman Estates board unanimously approved the Bulls' proposed NBA Development League (D-League) team.

The team received its name through a contest on the Chicago Bulls' website. Fans submitted about 3,600 suggestions, which were narrowed down to three finalists: Great Lakes Bulls, Heartland Bulls and Windy City Bulls. Windy City was announced as the winner in a pep rally/press conference on February 24, 2016.

The D-League rebranded as the NBA G League, after a league-wide sponsorship by Gatorade, in 2017. Their home arena was renamed Now Arena in 2020.

== Season-by-season ==
Season	Division	Regular season				Postseason results
Season	Division	Finish	Wins	Losses	Pct.	Postseason results
Windy City Bulls
2016–17	Central	5th	23	27	.460	
2017–18	Central	3rd	24	26	.480	
2018–19	Central	2nd	27	23	.540	Lost First Round (Westchester) 82–95
2019–20	Central	5th	17	26	.395	Season cancelled by COVID-19 pandemic
2020–21	Opted out of single-site season					
2021–22	Eastern	11th	15	19	.441	
2022–23	Eastern	7th	18	14	.563	
2023–24	Eastern	13th	15	19	.441	
2024–25	Eastern	16th	11	23	.324	
2025-26	Eastern	12th	15	21	.417	
Regular season record			165	181	.477	
Playoff record			0	1	.000	

== Current roster ==
Windy City Bulls roster
Players

Pos.	No.	Player	Height	Weight	DOB	From
F	–	Tobe Awaka (TW)	6 ft 8 in (2.03 m)	255 lb (116 kg)	2004-01-30	Arizona
F	7	Kevin Knox II	6 ft 7 in (2.01 m)	215 lb (98 kg)	1999-08-11	Kentucky
F	–	Drew Peterson	6 ft 8 in (2.03 m)	205 lb (93 kg)	1999-11-09	USC
G/F	5	Wooga Poplar	6 ft 5 in (1.96 m)	197 lb (89 kg)	2003-01-05	Villanova
G	21	Giddy Potts	6 ft 2 in (1.88 m)	220 lb (100 kg)	1995-08-08	Middle Tennessee
G	–	Erik Reynolds II	6 ft 2 in (1.88 m)	183 lb (83 kg)	2002-09-17	Saint Joseph's
G	–	Jaylin Sellers (TW)	6 ft 5 in (1.96 m)	205 lb (93 kg)	2003-06-03	Providence
G	3	Ryan Woolridge	6 ft 3 in (1.91 m)	175 lb (79 kg)	1996-11-16	Gonzaga

Coaches
Head coach
- William Donovan III
Assistant(s)
- Marko Andjelkovic
- Mike Greenman
- Amadou Mbodji
- Brandon Watkins

Legend
- (DP) Unsigned draft pick
- (FA) Free agent
- (S) Suspended
- (P) Prospects
- (NBA) On assignment from NBA affiliate
- (TW) Two-way affiliate player
- Injured

Roster
Updated: March 2, 2026

== Head coaches ==
#	Head coach	Term	Regular season				Playoffs				Achievements
#	Head coach	Term	G	W	L	Win%	G	W	L	Win%	Achievements
1	Nate Loenser	2016–2017	50	23	27	.460	—	—	—	—	
2	Charlie Henry	2017–2019	100	51	49	.510	1	0	1	.000	
3	Damian Cotter	2019–2020	43	17	26	.395	—	—	—	—	
4	Henry Domercant	2021–2024	66	33	33	.500	—	—	—	—	
5	William Donovan III	2024–2026	70	26	44	.371	—	—	—	—	
6	Quincy Pondexter	2026–present				–	—	—	—	—	

== NBA affiliates ==
- Chicago Bulls (2016–present)
