= William Donovan III =

American basketball player and coach

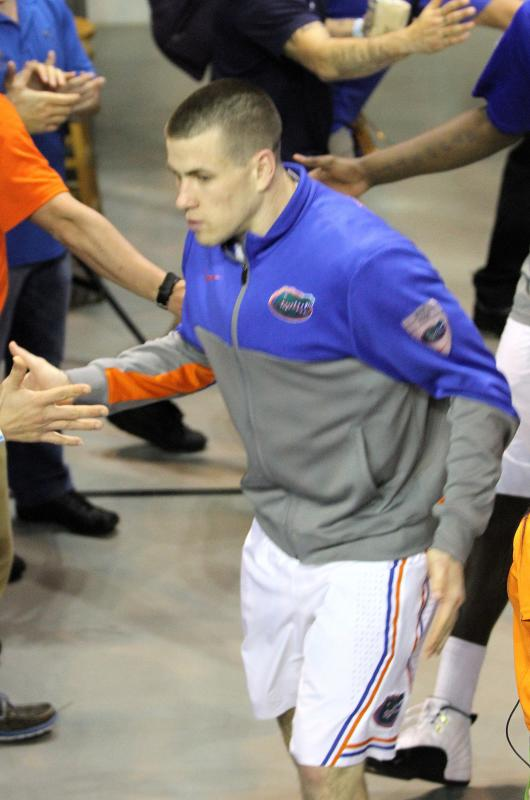

Personal information
- Born: February 10, 1992 (age 34) Lexington, Kentucky
- Listed height: 6 ft 2 in (1.88 m)
- Listed weight: 192 lb (87 kg)

Career information
- High school: Saint Francis Catholic High School (Gainesville, Florida)
- College: Catholic (2010–2012); Florida (2013–2015)
- NBA draft: 2015: undrafted
- Position: Point guard
- Coaching career: 2015–present

Career history

Coaching
- 2015–2016: Trinity Catholic HS (assistant)
- 2016–2017: Saint Francis Academy
- 2017: Austin Spurs (assistant)
- 2023–2024: Windy City Bulls (assistant)
- 2024–2026: Windy City Bulls

William Connor Donovan III (born February 10, 1992) is an American professional basketball coach. He is the son of Billy Donovan, the former head coach of the National Basketball Association's Chicago Bulls. Donovan is the former head coach of the Windy City Bulls.

== College career ==
William Donovan III, began his college career at Catholic University of America in Washington, D.C. As a sophomore, the Catholic University Cardinals played an exhibition game against the Florida Gators.

He transferred to Florida from Catholic University and walked on to his father's team as a reserve guard.

== Coaching career ==
On November 6, 2014, his father, Billy Donovan, said that Donovan would pursue a career in coaching. On March 23, 2016, he was named head coach for the Saint Francis Catholic Academy basketball team in Gainesville, FL. On June 5, 2024, Donovan was named the new head coach of the Windy City Bulls.
