= Seth Lederman =

American pharmacologist (born 1957)

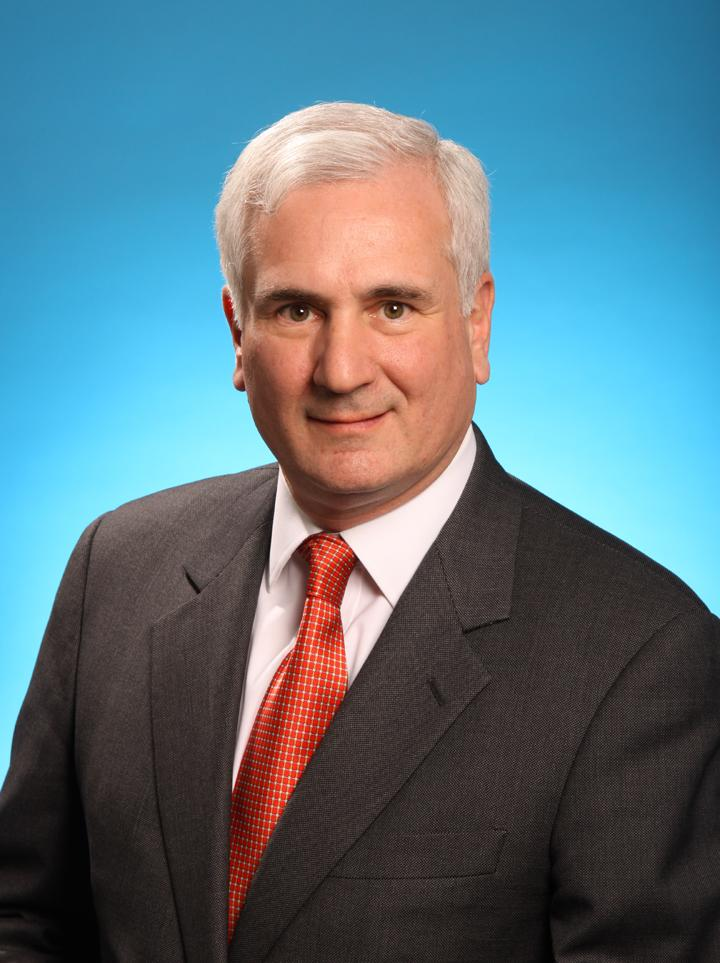
- Born: July 30, 1957 (age 69); New York, New York, United States
- Education: Princeton University, Columbia University
- Known for: Basic and translational research in immunology and therapeutics for autoimmunity, cancer and central nervous system disorders
- Scientific career
- Fields: Immunology, medicine, and pharmaceuticals
- Workplaces: Tonix Pharmaceuticals

Seth Lederman (born July 30, 1957) is an American physician of Tonix Pharmaceuticals, a specialty pharmaceutical product development company.

== Biography ==
Lederman earned his bachelor's degree in chemistry from Princeton University where he graduated cum laude in 1979. He completed his M.D. from Columbia University in 1983 and continued his training at the Columbia Presbyterian Medical Center until 1986. Lederman became an instructor at Columbia in 1985, assistant professor in 1988 and associate professor with tenure in 1996. From October 30, 2015, until November 1, 2016, he took a leave of absence, and left Columbia in April 2017. In addition to his research, he served as attending physician in the Edward Daniels Faulkner Arthritis Clinic at Columbia Presbyterian Hospital from 1988 to 1996 and served as associate attending physician at Columbia Presbyterian Hospital until 2000 (now New York Presbyterian Hospital).

As assistant professor at Columbia, Lederman discovered the CD40-Ligand (CD154) and elucidated the molecular basis of T cell helper function. He also collaborated with Professor David Baltimore in identifying and functionally characterizing the CD40 signaling molecule, TRAF-3. Lederman's "early work on HIV contributed to the understanding of how the V3 loop of HIV gp120 was involved in fusion with CD4 cell membranes, an early and essential event in viral entry and infection".

Lederman founded Targent Pharmaceuticals, which sold levoleucovorin to Spectrum Pharmaceuticals, which markets it as Fusilev. He co-founded and served as a managing partner of Konanda Pharma Partners and Konanda Pharma Fund I, LP, and its wholly owned operating companies, Validus and Fontus Pharmaceuticals Inc. Validus acquired Fontus and markets Equetro (carbamazepine – Extended Release), Marplan (isocarboxazid) and Rocaltrol (calcitriol).

Lederman founded Tonix Pharmaceuticals, which developed TNX-102 SL, an investigational sublingual tablet for post-traumatic stress disorder (PTSD) and fibromyalgia. In January 2024, Tonix announced that the U.S. Food and Drug Administration (FDA) had conditionally accepted the trade name, TONMYA™, for TNX-102 SL for the management of fibromyalgia.

On August 15, 2025, the U.S. Food and Drug Administration approved TNX-102 SL as TONMYA™ for the management of fibromyalgia, making it the first new FDA-approved fibromyalgia therapy in over 15 years. (NDA 219428)

The approval was supported by statistically significant results from two pivotal Phase 3 studies: the RELIEF trial (TNX-FIH-301) and the RESILIENT trial (TNX-FIH-304).

== Discovery of CD40-ligand (CD154) ==
As assistant professor at Columbia, Lederman discovered the CD40-Ligand (CD154) and elucidated the molecular basis of T cell helper function. His work on the (CD154) led to the development of therapeutic candidates for autoimmune diseases and organ transplant rejection in collaboration with Biogen and UCB/CellTech. Dartmouth College challenged the CD40-Ligand patents, but the challenge (called an interference) was rejected on all claims. UCB is currently in Phase 2 trials with dapirolizumab pegol (a pegylated anti-CD40L Fab'). Transcriptional changes in Dapirolizumab pegol treated Systemic Lupus Erythematosus (SLE) patients were recently reported.

== Tonix Pharmaceuticals and biodefense ==
TNX-801 is a new potential vaccine for smallpox. TNX-801 is a synthetic form of horsepox, an otherwise extinct virus. Evolutionary analysis of modern vaccines indicates that the vaccine isolated and used by Edward Jenner to vaccinate against smallpox was either horsepox or something quite similar. A 1902 sample of vaccinia smallpox vaccine was characterized and found to be 99.7% similar to horsepox, further supporting the connection with Jenner's vaccine. The synthesis of horsepox was a collaboration with David Evans and Ryan Noyce at the University of Alberta in Edmonton, Alberta, Canada. TNX-801 or horsepox is the first poxvirus, or poxviridae, to be synthesized, and provides a platform for developing new vaccines against infectious disease and cancer. The finding that a horsepox vaccine was in clinical use in the U.S. in 1902 to protect against smallpox provides strong support for the efficacy of TNX-801 horsepox vaccine to protect against smallpox.

TNX-1800 (live modified horsepox virus vaccine) is being developed by Tonix Pharmaceuticals in a strategic collaboration with Southern Research to support the development of a vaccine to protect against the new coronavirus disease, COVID-19. TNX-1800 is based on Tonix's proprietary horsepox vaccine platform. It is believed that horsepox has the potential to serve as a vector for vaccines to protect against other infectious agents. The new research collaboration will develop and test a potential horsepox vaccine that expresses protein from the virus that causes COVID-19 to protect against the disease.

== International biotechnology policy and cooperation ==
In September 2015, Lederman represented U.S. biotechnology at a summit with CCP General Secretary Xi Jinping. The summit was organized by the United States Chamber of Commerce and was held September 17–18, 2015 in Beijing. The delegation of U.S. CEOs, former U.S. cabinet officials and leading academic experts was the seventh meeting of the U.S.-China CEO and Former Senior Officials' Dialogue. The dialogue was co-chaired by the United States Chamber of Commerce and the China Center for International Economic Exchanges (CCIEE), led by former Vice Premier Zeng Peiyan.
