= Mark Stephen Jendrysik =

- Born: October 2, 1964 (age 61); Springfield, Massachusetts, USA
- Education: Providence College (BA); University of North Carolina at Chapel Hill (MA, PhD)
- Scientific career
- Workplaces: University of North Dakota

Mark Jendrysik (/dʒɛnˈdraɪsɪk/ jen-DRY-sik; born October 2, 1964) is a professor in the Political Science and Public Administration Department of the University of North Dakota.

He is primarily interested in contemporary American political thought, but he has also published and presented papers on the seventeenth-century English political thought, utopian political theory, and ethnic politics in the United States. He is the author of Explaining the English Revolution: Hobbes and His Contemporaries (Lexington, 2002) and Modern Jeremiahs: Contemporary Visions of American Decline (Rowman and Littlefield, 2008). His most recent book, Utopia was published as part of the Key Concepts in Political Theory series by Polity in 2020.

== Biography ==
Jendrysik is of Polish ancestry. He is a native of Chicopee, Massachusetts. He attended Valetine School, in Chicopee Massachusetts 1969–1976, and then the P.E. Bowe School in Chicopee 1976-1978 and Chicopee High School 1978–82. While at Chicopee High he was a founding member of the Cylinders, an artistic collective that produced music and comedy skits. He received a BA from Providence College, Providence RI in 1986, a MA from University of North Carolina at Chapel Hill in 1988, and a PhD from the same university in 1996

From 1995 to 1996 he was a Research Associate, Center for Survey Research, University of Virginia, and then in 1996–8 a Visiting assistant professor, Bucknell University, follow by an appointment at the same level from 1998 to 1999, at the University of Mississippi, 1998–9. In 1999 he was appointed assistant professor at the University of North Dakota rising through the ranks to Associate and then full Professor.

== Books ==
- Modern Jeremiahs: Contemporary Visions of American Decline. Lanham, Maryland: Rowman and Littlefield, Lexington Books, 2008
- Explaining the English Revolution: Hobbes and His Contemporaries. Lanham, Maryland: Lexington Books, 2002 (revised paperback edition, 2007). Reviewed in: Journal of Church and State, Vol. 47. No. 1 (170). 2005; Perspectives on Politics, Vol. 1, No. 4 (763), 2003
- Utopia (Key Concepts in Political Theory). Cambridge, UK: Polity, 2020.
