= Conservation and Use of Wild Populations of Coffea arabica =

Research project in Ethiopia

COCE is the name of a research project and stands for "Conservation and Use of Wild Populations of Coffea arabica in the Montane Rainforests of Ethiopia".

The project is financed by the German Ministry for Education and Research (BMBF) and carried out by the Center for Development Research, ZEF Bonn in Germany and with the Institute of Biodiversity Conservation and the Ethiopian Coffee Forest Forum in Ethiopia.

== Background ==
The montane rain forests in southeast Ethiopia, the birthplace of wild Coffea arabica, were the origin of a large part of modern commercially used Coffea breeds. Due to the dwindling size of the montane rain forests as a result of clearing, the precious resource of wild Arabica coffee, and the genetic diversity it contains, is increasingly threatened.

Approximately 40% of Ethiopia's land area was covered by dense forests at the end of the 1960s. This has now fallen to 2.7 percent. The former Kingdom of Kaffa in the southwest of the country is now a part of the Southern Nations, Nationalities and People's Region, one of the nine ethnic divisions of Ethiopia. The rapidly developing town of Bonga is the economic center of the Kaffa region. In the Kaffa region there are only 200,000 acres of undisturbed African montane rain forest remaining. However, these are extremely threatened in their existence, because of pressure on this forest region—due to the growing population, infrastructure projects such as road construction and investors plans—which has been increasing steadily.

== List of key partner organizations ==
- Bundesamt für Naturschutz (BfN), Bonn, Germany
- Bureau for Environmental and Ecological-economic Assessment (BETA), Wageningen, Netherlands
- Centre de Coopération Internationale en Recherche Agronomique pour le Développement (CIRAD), Montpellier, France
- Centro de Investigação das Ferrugens do Cafeeiro (CIFC), Oeiras, Portugal
- Department of Biology Education, University of Addis Ababa, Ethiopia
- Department of Biology, University Addis Abeba, Ethiopia
- Deutsche Gesellschaft für Technische Zusammenarbeit mbh (GTZ), Addis Ababa, Ethiopia / Eschborn, Germany
- EcoSecurities, Environmental Finance Solutions, Oxford, United Kingdom
- Ethiopian Coffee Forest Forum (ECFF), Addis Ababa, Ethiopia
- Ethiopian Economic Association (EEA), Addis Ababa, Ethiopia
- Ethiopian Institute for Agricultural Research (EIAR), Addis Ababa, Ethiopia
- Ethiopian Ministry of Agriculture and Rural Development, Addis Ababa, Ethiopia
- EU Coffee Improvement Program (CIP IV)
- Evolve – Consulting for Sustainable Development, Kirchzarten, Germany
- GEO schützt den Regenwald e. V., Hamburg, Germany
- Institute for Biodiversity Conservation (IBC), Addis Ababa, Ethiopia
- Institut für Nutzpflanzenwissenschaften und Ressourcenschutz (INRES), University of Bonn, Germany
- Institut für Pflanzenernährung, University of Bonn, Germany
- International Coffee Genome Network (ICGN), Montpellier, France
- Jima Agricultural Research Center, Ethiopian Institute for Agricultural Research (EIAR, former EARO), Jimma, Ethiopia
- Kraft Foods, Bremen, Germany
- Landwirtschaftlich-Gärtnerische Fakultät – Fachgebiet Ressourcenökonomie, Humboldt-Universität, Berlin, Germany
- Lernprozesse für nachhaltige Entwicklung, Wuppertal, Germany
- National Herbarium of Ethiopia, University of Addis Ababa, Ethiopia
- Nees Institut für Biodiversität der Pflanzen, University of Bonn, Germany
- Regional Coffee Producer Associations, Ethiopia
- Science Development, Wuppertal, Germany

== Unannotated references ==
- https://web.archive.org/web/20120727104914/http://www.coffee.uni-bonn.de/
- http://www.geo.de/GEO/natur/oekologie/regenwaldverein/nachrichten/61313.html
- http://ec.europa.eu/europeaid/tender/data/d18/AOF79818.pdf%5B‍%5D
- http://www.evolve-sustainable-development.de/downloads/Certification%20options%20for%20Ethiopian%20wild%20forest%20coffee%20-%20CoCE%20Project%20report.pdf%5B‍%5D
- https://web.archive.org/web/20131031102859/http://www.zef.de/367.html
- http://www.ecff.org.et/component/content/article/10-yayu/6-yayu-coffee-forest-biosphere-reserve.html
- https://web.archive.org/web/20160303220447/http://www.citeulike.org/user/klauso/article/12011979
- http://www.biota-africa.org/spier_propfinal_detail_ba.php?ref_id=507&Page_ID=L975_13&PHPSESSID=btmse7ug8du88l97dbmt1s1692
- http://www.tropentag.de/2010/abstracts/full/404.pdf
- http://gadaa.com/OromoStudies/wp-content/uploads/2013/04/Wild-Arabica-Coffee-Populations-Under-Severe-Threat-Farmers-Perception-of-Existence-Access-to-and-Conservation-needs-in-the-Montane-Rainforests-Oromia-South.pdf
