= Saint Francis Catholic Academy =

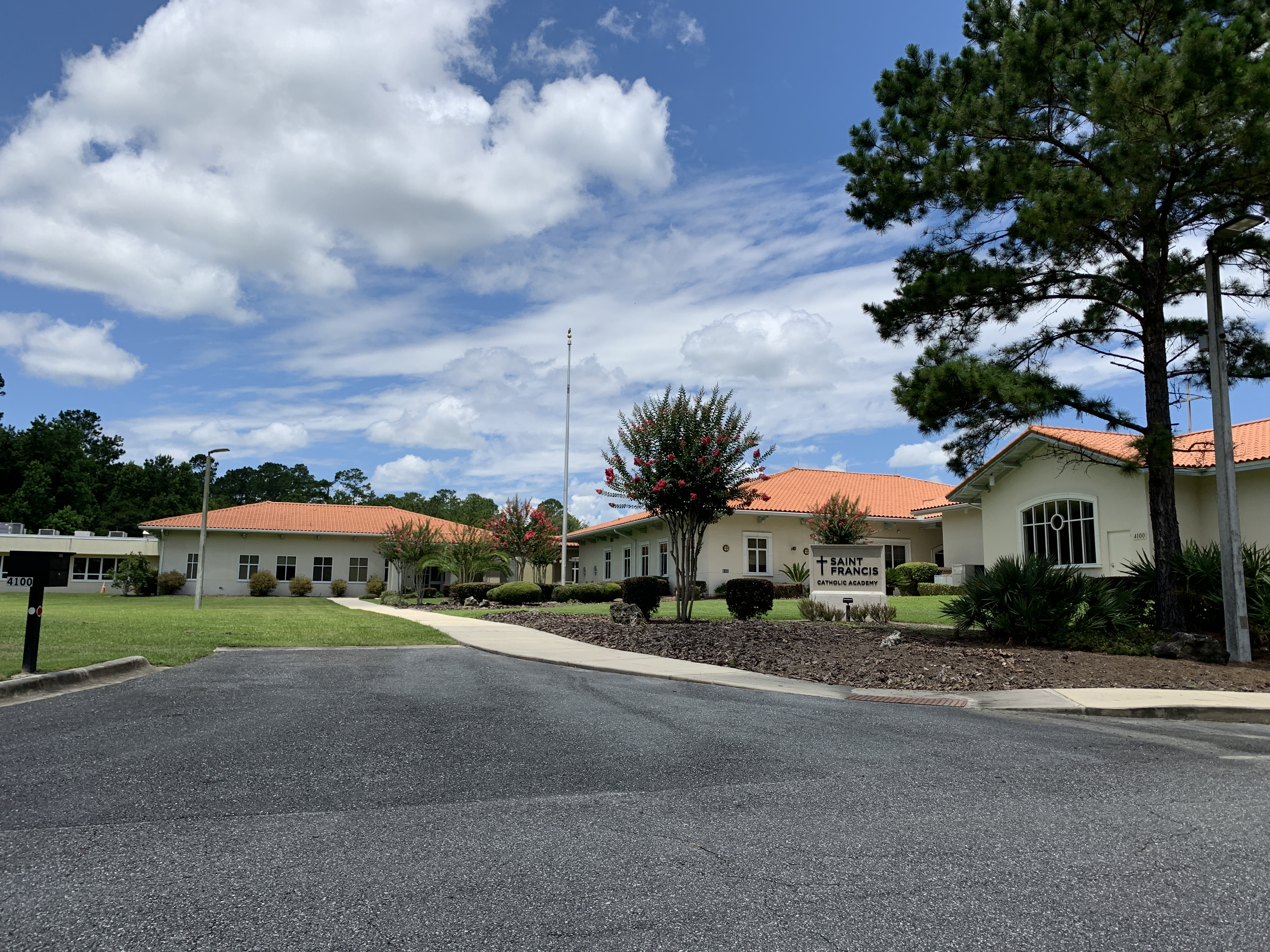
- Saint Francis Catholic Academy, June 2020

Location
- 4100 NW 115th Terrace; Gainesville, Florida 32606; United States
- 29°41′34″N 82°28′0″W

Information
- Type: Private, Coeducational
- Motto: "Fides, Scientia, Virtus" ("Faith, Knowledge, and Virtue")
- Religious affiliation: Roman Catholic
- Patron saint: St. Francis of Assisi
- Established: 2004
- Oversight: Diocese of St. Augustine
- Principal: Jason Acosta
- Grades: 9–12
- Enrollment: ~ 275
- Colors: Blue; Gray; White
- Mascot: Gubbio the Wolf
- Nickname: Wolves
- Rival: Oak Hall School
- Accreditation: Florida Catholic Conference; Southern Association of Colleges and Schools
- Yearbook: Lupi
- Website: sfcawolves.org

Saint Francis Catholic Academy (commonly referred to as Saint Francis or SFCA) is a private, college-preparatory, coeducational Catholic high school in Gainesville, Florida. Opened in 2004 as St. Francis Catholic High School, the school is located in and administered by the Roman Catholic Diocese of St. Augustine. It became Saint Francis Catholic Academy in 2016. It is named in honor of Saint Francis of Assisi, inspired by the nearby historic Mission San Francisco de Potano, the first doctrina (a mission with a resident priest) in Florida west of the St. Johns River.

In 2024, the school was recognized as an Apple Distinguished School for the 2024-2027 term.

== History ==
Saint Francis was established through a community effort that first began in May 1983. In 1999, the Diocese of St. Augustine's high school task force found room for expansion in northwest Gainesville near the interchange of Interstate 75 and Northwest 39th Avenue, and St. Francis Catholic High School opened on August 16, 2004, to serve the growing population. The campaign to open the school was named the Opportunity of a Lifetime Campaign.

Michael Gannon, distinguished professor emeritus at the University of Florida and a former priest, petitioned Bishop John J. Snyder to name the school in honor of St. Francis and the mission church destroyed by English and Native American raiders in 1706.

The first students, a class of 61, attended classes in the Upper Hall at the nearby Holy Faith Catholic Church while the new building was being completed, which was dedicated on April 24, 2005. The associate pastor's office at Holy Faith served as a computer lab.

In 2007, a new $1.2 million academic wing was added through fundraising led by Christine Donovan, wife of former University of Florida men's basketball coach Billy Donovan and a Saint Francis parent. Their son, Billy Donovan Jr., was formerly the head Wolves basketball coach and is a 2014 alumnus of the school. Former Florida Gators football coach Urban Meyer and Gainesville native alternative band Sister Hazel also aided in organizing the second phase of the school's construction.

In 2016, Saint Francis dropped the "high school" moniker and changed its name to Saint Francis Catholic Academy. Jason Acosta was named principal of the school in 2018.

The school became an AP Capstone School in 2018, conferring its first diplomas in 2020. In 2019, a relic of Saint Francis of Assisi was brought to the school grounds and displayed in the school's chapel.

Saint Francis launched its Health Science Institute in 2021 and its Institute for Entrepreneurship and Innovation in 2023. The school's eight-lane track was rubberized in 2022. Also in 2023, two additional first-class relics from St. Clare of Assisi and St. Carlo Acutis arrived and were first displayed in the chapel. A new indoor weight room was added to the campus in 2024.

== Academics ==
Saint Francis Catholic Academy offers dual enrollment opportunities both on campus and virtually through three partner higher education institutions: the University of Florida, Barry University, and Santa Fe College.

=== AP curriculum ===
Saint Francis offers Advanced Placement (AP) courses in the following 22 subject areas:

- 2-D Design
- Biology
- Chemistry
- Environmental Science
- Physics
- Precalculus
- Calculus AB
- Computer Science
- Statistics
- English Language
- English Literature
- Spanish Language
- Microeconomics
- European History
- World History
- United States History
- United States Government and Politics
- Psychology
- Human Geography
- Latin
- AP Seminar
- AP Research

=== Institutes ===
Saint Francis debuted its Health Science Institute in 2021, offering four years of courses exploring medical and health professions and hands-on coursework. Students have the option to complete one of three certificate program tracks in electrocardiogram (EKG) technician, pharmacy technician, and certified nursing assistant (CNA) through the program. The first students to earn their CNA certification through HSI graduated in 2025.

Saint Francis' Institute for Entrepreneurship and Innovation opened in 2023, offering coursework in marketing, management, accounting and other fields. Students studying in the institute have the opportunity to become QuickBooks certified in their 12th-grade year.

Saint Francis' Institute for Teaching and Learning, founded to encourage and prepare future teachers, launched in fall 2024.

=== Technology ===
Saint Francis has been a 1:1 technology school with Apple devices since 2012. Every student, faculty member and staff member receives a MacBook Air laptop.

=== Honor societies ===
Saint Francis students have been inducted into the school's chapter of eight different honors societies:

- National Honor Society
- Mu Alpha Theta
- Quill and Scroll
- Tri-M
- International Thespian Society
- Sociedad Honoraria Hispánica
- National Junior Classical League (Latin Honor Society)
- National Technical Honor Society

== Athletics ==
Saint Francis' athletic teams, known as the Wolves, compete in the Florida High School Athletic Association (FHSAA).The nickname takes inspiration from the Wolf of Gubbio, a wolf who terrorized the Umbrian city of Gubbio until he was tamed by Francis of Assisi acting on behalf of God. More than 50 former Wolves athletes have participated in intercollegiate athletics after playing at Saint Francis. In 2016, Saint Francis' girls' volleyball team captured the school's first FHSAA state championship.

Saint Francis fields teams in the following boys' and girls' sports:

Boys' sports	Girls' sports
Baseball	Basketball
Basketball	Cheerleading
Cross country	Cross country
Football	Golf
Golf	Soccer
Soccer	Softball
Swimming	Swimming
Track and Field	Track and Field
Tennis	Tennis
Weightlifting	Volleyball
	Weightlifting
