= Cocaine esterase =

Class of enzymes

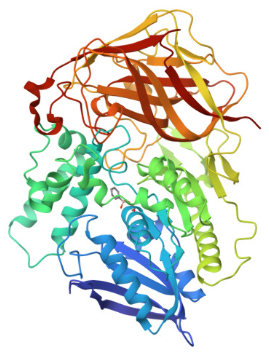

Identifiers
- EC no.: 3.1.1.84

Databases
- BRENDA: enzyme data
- ExPASy: NiceZyme view
- KEGG: enzyme entry
- MetaCyc: metabolic pathway
- Rhea: reactions
- PDB structures: RCSB PDB PDBe PDBsum
Search
- PMC: articles
- PubMed: articles
- NCBI: proteins

The enzyme cocaine esterase (EC 3.1.1.84, CocE, hCE2, hCE-2, human carboxylesterase 2; systematic name cocaine benzoylhydrolase) catalyses the reaction

cocaine
H_{2}O
methylecgonine
+
benzoic acid

Rhodococcus sp. strain MB1 and Pseudomonas maltophilia strain MB11L can utilize cocaine as sole source of carbon and energy.

The theoretical molecular mass of the enzyme is 62,128 Da. This enzyme and redesigned versions of it have been studied as a potential treatment for cocaine addiction in humans.

TNX-1300 (T172R/G173Q double-mutant cocaine esterase 200 mg, i.v. solution) is being developed under an Investigational New Drug application (IND) for the treatment of cocaine intoxication. TNX-1300 (formerly known as RBP-8000) is a recombinant protein enzyme produced through rDNA technology in a non-disease-producing strain of E. coli bacteria. Cocaine Esterase (CocE) was identified in bacteria (Rhodococcus) that use cocaine as its sole source of carbon and nitrogen and that grow in soil surrounding coca plants. The gene encoding CocE was identified and the protein was extensively characterized. CoCE catalyzes the breakdown of cocaine into metabolite ecgonine methyl ester and benzoic acid. Wild-type CocE is unstable at body temperature, so targeted mutations were introduced in the CocE gene and resulted in the T172R/G173Q Double-Mutant CocE, which is active for approximately 6 hours at body temperature. In a Phase 2 study, TNX-1300 at 100 mg or 200 mg i.v. doses was well tolerated and interrupted cocaine effects after cocaine 50 mg i.v. challenge.

The enzyme is important in bioremediation, levels of cocaine in European ocean water were cited at 20 ng/L, similar levels in which swollen muscles, and in some cases broken muscle fibers of eels were reported in a controlled study.
