= 1972 ABA draft =

Basketball player selection

General information
- Sport: Basketball
- Dates: March 2, 1972 (Rounds 1–5); April 12, 1972 (Rounds 6–20)
- Location: New York, New York

Overview
- 179 total selections in 20 rounds
- League: American Basketball Association
- Teams: 11
- First selection: Bob McAdoo, Virginia Squires via Pittsburgh Condors

The 1972 ABA draft was the sixth draft done by the American Basketball Association (ABA), a rivaling professional basketball league to the National Basketball Association (NBA) that they would eventually merge as a part of the NBA only a few years later despite official merger talks ultimately being dead during the later, more competitive years of the ABA's history.

This year would see an odd thing happen with the first five rounds of this year's draft not be recorded properly as of 2025 in terms of round ordering (outside of arguably the first round due to four teams losing their first round picks in situations relating to the previous draft year, if not the previous season) from March 2, 1972 (weeks before the 1972 NCAA University Division basketball tournament was properly completed) via standings from February 20 (though with the Pittsburgh Condors and Memphis Pros alternating between leading round orders this year since they both tied their official records that season at the time), while the rest of the rounds of this draft would be recorded properly in terms of draft ordering on April 12 all at the ABA's headquarters in New York.

This draft also was the first draft in the ABA to allow their teams to draft one college underclassman to the first five rounds of the draft after seeing major success with underclassmen like Spencer Haywood, Ralph Simpson, George McGinnis, and Julius Erving going from undrafted players to successful, All-Star quality players in the ABA. This new policy created by the ABA drew strong criticisms from both the NCAA and numerous college coaches when it first happened, but it would eventually help pave the way for numerous college underclassmen to take their chances with later ABA and NBA drafts the more years passed by following this draft period by the ABA.

However, the ABA wouldn't see as much success from this year's draft when compared to drafts from their previous years, with most of these college underclassmen opting to return to college for at least one more year instead and a number of Hall of Fame players, including that of their #1 pick in junior Bob McAdoo, going to the NBA instead despite him not being drafted at #1 that year there.

This draft period would also be the last draft that the Memphis Pros would participate in under that name since they would rebrand themselves to the Memphis Tams after this main draft period by June 1972, as well as be the last event altogether for "The Floridians" and the Pittsburgh Condors franchises, as they would both fold operations months after this draft concluded on July 13, 1972, with a new team called the San Diego Conquistadors being created a month later on August 10 that same year.

== Draftee career notes ==
This year's #1 pick would mark the second year in a row where the ABA would not only have a different #1 pick from the NBA altogether, but also had a #1 pick that was owned by one team get itself traded to another team before the upcoming draft year began. While the NBA's draft had one of the biggest busts in NBA history via LaRue Martin from Loyola University Chicago going to the Portland Trail Blazers (which had the ABA see Martin being drafted fifth (presumably speaking) by the Dallas Chaparrals by comparison), the ABA's draft had one of the members of both the 50 Greatest EuroLeague Contributors and later NBA 75th Anniversary Team in junior Bob McAdoo from the University of North Carolina as the #1 pick by the Virginia Squires by a trade with the Pittsburgh Condors (though he was selected second overall in the NBA by the Buffalo Braves).

However, much like the previous #1 pick for the ABA draft, Jim McDaniels, McAdoo would not play for the ABA team that drafted him at all (though like most #1 picks done by the ABA, he ended up opting to play for the NBA instead). McAdoo would prove his success almost immediately once he went professional by winning the NBA's Rookie of the Year Award, be named a five-time All-Star there, be named a member of the All-NBA Second Team in 1974 and All-NBA First Team in 1975 (including the NBA's MVP award for the latter year), be named a three-time scoring champion for the NBA from 1974 until 1976, and later be named a two-time NBA Finals champion while with the Showtime Lakers before he later went to Italy for the rest of his career from 1986 until retiring in 1992 with two Italian and EuroLeague championships (the second one including the EuroLeague Finals Top Scorer and EuroLeague Final Four MVP honors) won with Tracer Milano in the process. His honors not just with the NBA, but also Italy would help him earn a spot in the Naismith Basketball Hall of Fame, with McAdoo also being joined by Denver Rockets pick Paul Westphal from the University of Southern California and Dallas Chaparrals selected sophomore Bill Walton from UCLA (the latter of whom would become the #1 pick for the 1974 NBA draft as well), who both won at least one NBA Finals championship themselves during their careers and had significant success during their professional careers in the NBA.

Out of the 92 overall ABA All-Stars, there were six players eligible to be selected in this year's draft that would make it to the ABA All-Star Game either twice or once while the event existed: Brian Taylor, James Silas, and Swen Nater would make it to the All-Star Game twice in the ABA, while Claude Terry, the undrafted Don Buse, and the undrafted Dave Twardzik would make it to the All-Star Game only once there. Brian Taylor would be the player to see some of the most honors given to a player from this year's draft that actually played in the ABA with Taylor not only being named the Rookie of the Year in 1973 and an All-Star in the final two seasons of the ABA's existence, but also won the ABA Finals championship twice while with the New York Nets (including the final ABA Finals championship as a whole), was twice a member of the ABA's All-Defensive Team in the league's final seasons of play (joining six other players to join that team twice in their careers), and led the ABA in steals in 1975, though he would be strangely absent from the ABA All-Time Team in spite of his honors.

One player that would make the ABA's All-Time Team, however, was James Silas, whose honors from the ABA included being a member of the ABA's All-Rookie Team in 1973, two All-Star appearances in the league's final seasons of play, an All-ABA Second Team spot in 1975, and an All-ABA First Team spot in 1976 (though he would later have his number retired by the San Antonio Spurs, the predecessors of the Dallas Chaparrals, in 1984, two years after retiring from play altogether and three years after last playing for the franchise in general). Another player from this draft that would also win Rookie of the Year honors by the ABA (albeit a year after Brian Taylor won his award there) was the Dutch-born Swen Nater, who returned to UCLA after the draft following "The Floridians" franchise folding operations entirely before being considered an undrafted signee for the following year's draft that later signed with the Virginia Squires after they had previously picked up his player rights in the ABA's first ever dispersal draft; Swen Nater would not only win the ABA's Rookie of the Year Award in 1974, but he'd also be named an ABA All-Star and a member of the All-ABA Second Team twice in two out of three seasons of play in the ABA (as well as lead not just the ABA in rebounding in 1975, but also the NBA in rebounding in 1980).

The last player that was drafted this year to make it to an ABA All-Star Game, Claude Terry, was mainly named an All-Star due to the Denver Nuggets (the modern predecessors of the Denver Rockets) being the best team of the ABA during the final All-Star Game in the ABA's existence due to the unique circumstances from before the 1976 ABA All-Star Game. As for the other two players that made it to an ABA All-Star Game while also not being drafted during this year's draft period, Don Buse from the at the time Division II University of Evansville decided to forgo playing for the Phoenix Suns (who drafted him in the third round of the 1972 NBA draft) immediately for a shot at playing with his home state Indiana Pacers, which led to him being an ABA Finals champion in 1973, a two-time ABA All-Defensive team member in the league's final two seasons of existence, and an ABA All-Star (by replacing a player from the Denver Nuggets), an All-ABA Second Team member, and the ABA's leader in steals during that league's final season of existence before seeing similar looking success in the NBA following the eventual ABA-NBA merger with both the Pacers and Suns later in his career. Finally, Dave Twardzik from Old Dominion University stayed with the area's Virginia Squires team as an undrafted player, yet he was able to make it to the ABA's All-Star Game in 1975 (despite that team having the worst record in league history by that time) before later winning an NBA Finals championship in 1977 and then having his number be retired by the Portland Trail Blazers.

== Historic draft notes ==
Strangely enough, this draft period would be the only draft period to have recorded inconsistencies in terms of even draft locations of certain players, never mind draft orderings found within the first five rounds of the 1972 ABA draft (if not even later than that), according to the select few basketball websites that are willing to record the ABA's draft record history in the first place. As such, the ordering of not just certain players that were drafted, but even certain teams that might have drafted some of these players are expected to be wildly inconsistent in terms of provided results given out to the public as of 2025, meaning this draft order shown here is likely not going to be 100% accurate in terms of output, especially since it looked like many teams lost selections within the first five rounds of the draft during this year (potentially due to some stipulations relating to the first failed ABA-NBA merger plans made earlier in the decade). That being said, this draft period would be considered the last draft period where the Memphis Pros would participate under that team name, since they would later rename themselves to the Memphis Tams (Tams being an acronym of the states of Tennessee, Alabama, and Mississippi that the franchise hoped to gain a local fanbase from out of each state, with their new logo in that time reflecting that name by showcasing a tam o'shanter style hat in terms of a more physical representation of what the Tams in question were). It also ultimately became the last draft event altogether for both "The Floridians" and the Pittsburgh Condors franchises since they would both fold operations entirely on July 13, 1972, leaving the ABA with only nine operating teams for less than a month before the creation of the San Diego Conquistadors months after this draft period ended on August 10 that same year effectively had the team taking on both of those teams' spots since they both looked at San Diego as a relocation option at one point in time, as well as led to the ABA working with 10 teams for most of its operating tenure instead of 11 teams going forward.

== Key ==
Pos.	G	F	C
Position	Guard	Forward	Center

Accomplishments key
Symbol	Meaning	Symbol	Meaning
^	Denotes player who has been inducted to the Naismith Memorial Basketball Hall of Fame	‡	Denotes player that was selected to the ABA All-Time Team
*	Denotes player who has been selected for at least one All-Star Game and All-ABA Team	+	Denotes player who has been selected for at least one All-Star Game
~	Denotes a player that won the ABA Rookie of the Year Award	#	Denotes player who has never appeared in either an ABA or NBA regular season or playoff game

== Draft ==
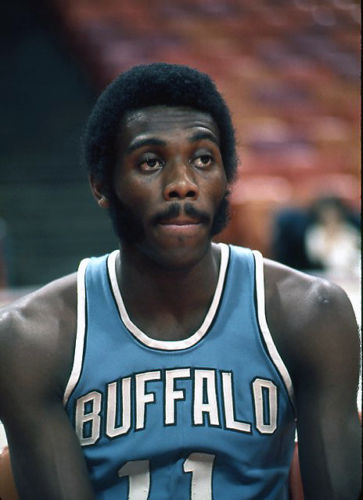
Bob McAdoo was the first pick of the 1972 ABA Draft by the Virginia Squires via trading with the Pittsburgh Condors.

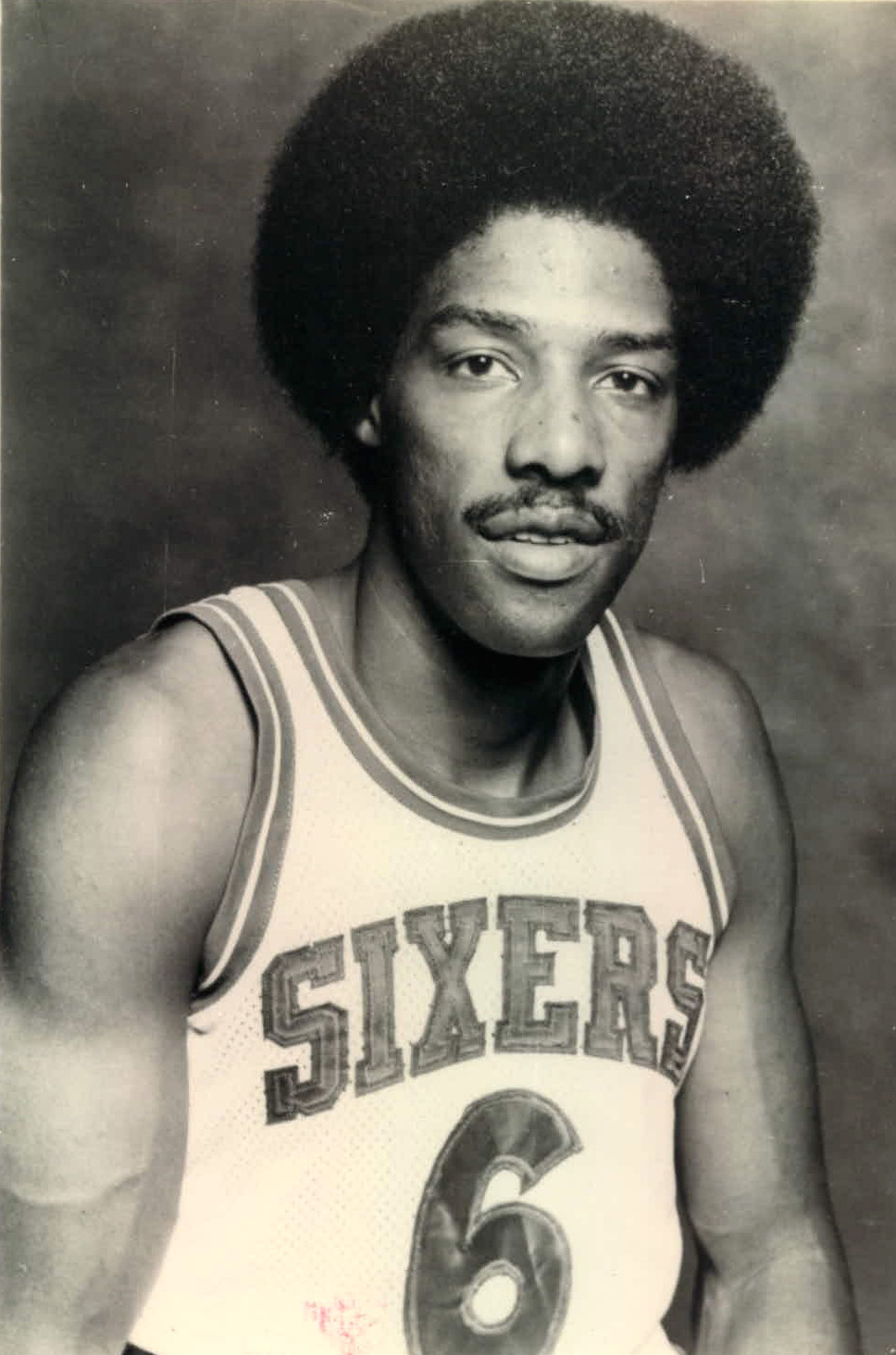
Julius Erving was the price paid by the Virginia Squires in exchange for them forfeiting what would have been the seventh pick in the 1972 ABA Draft.

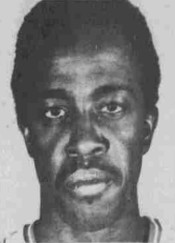
Jimmy Jones was the price paid by the Utah Stars in exchange for them giving up their own first round pick (which would have been the new seventh pick) in the 1972 ABA Draft.

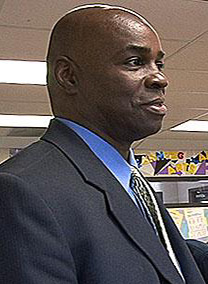
Brian Taylor was presumably the nineteenth pick in the 1972 ABA Draft by the New York Nets.

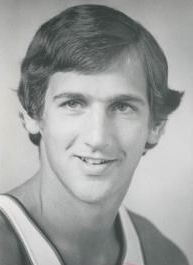
Paul Westphal was presumably the 20th pick in the 1972 ABA Draft by the Denver Rockets.

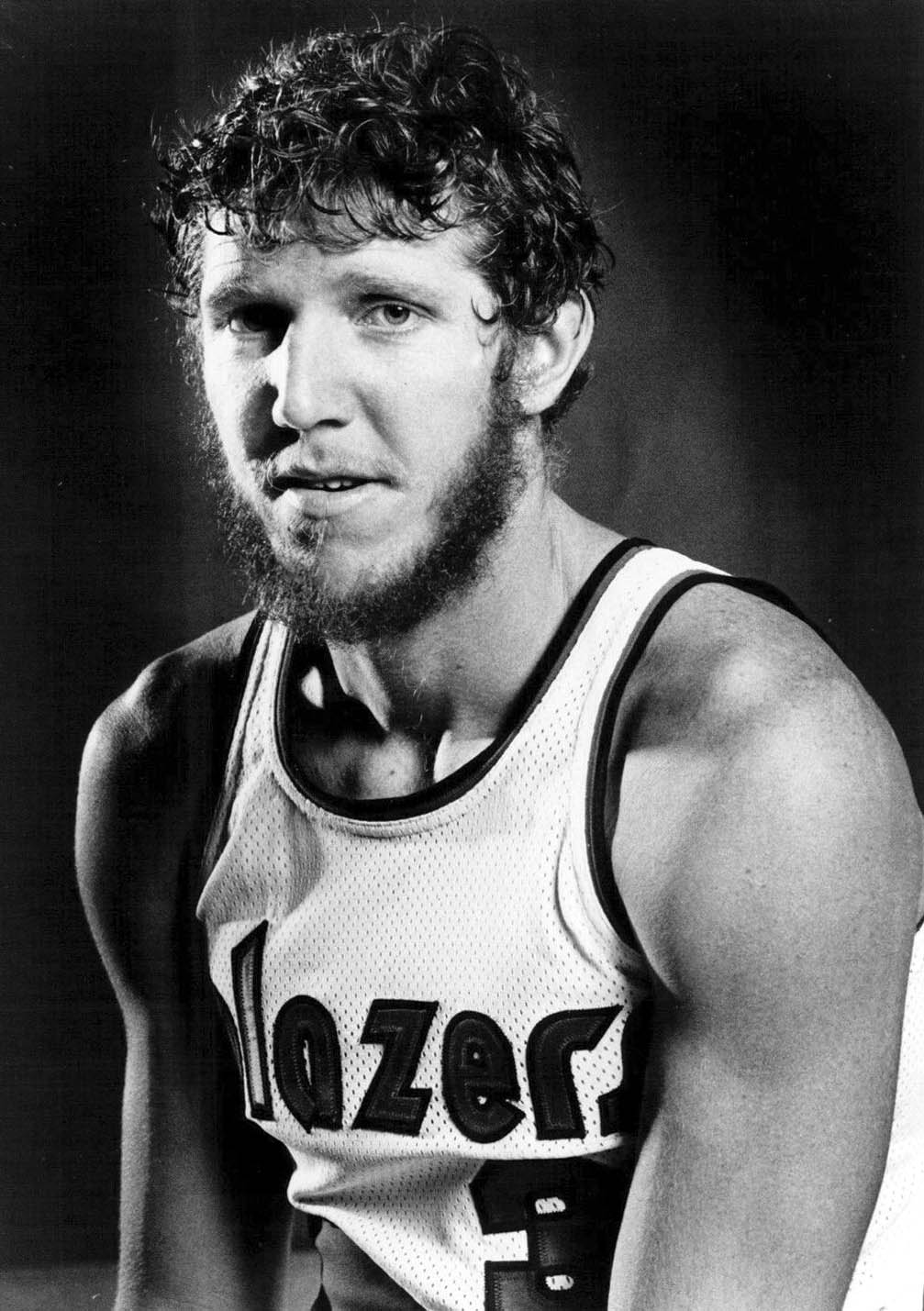
Bill Walton was presumably the 33rd pick in the 1972 ABA Draft by the Dallas Chaparrals.

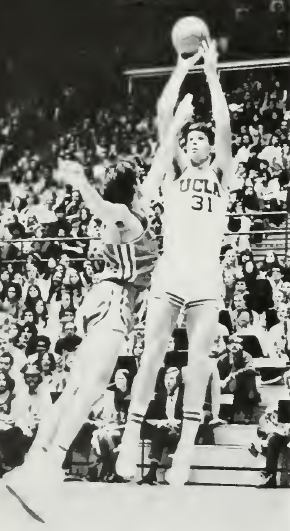
Swen Nater (back) was presumably the 58th pick in the seventh round of the 1972 ABA Draft by "The Floridians" franchise; Nater would later be picked up by the Virginia Squires during the league's first ever dispersal draft months later as the ninth pick there.

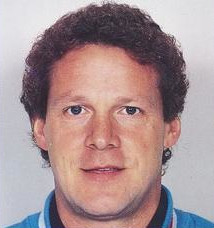
Don Buse was an undrafted player from the 1972 ABA Draft that would see decent success throughout his professional career after signing with the Indiana Pacers.

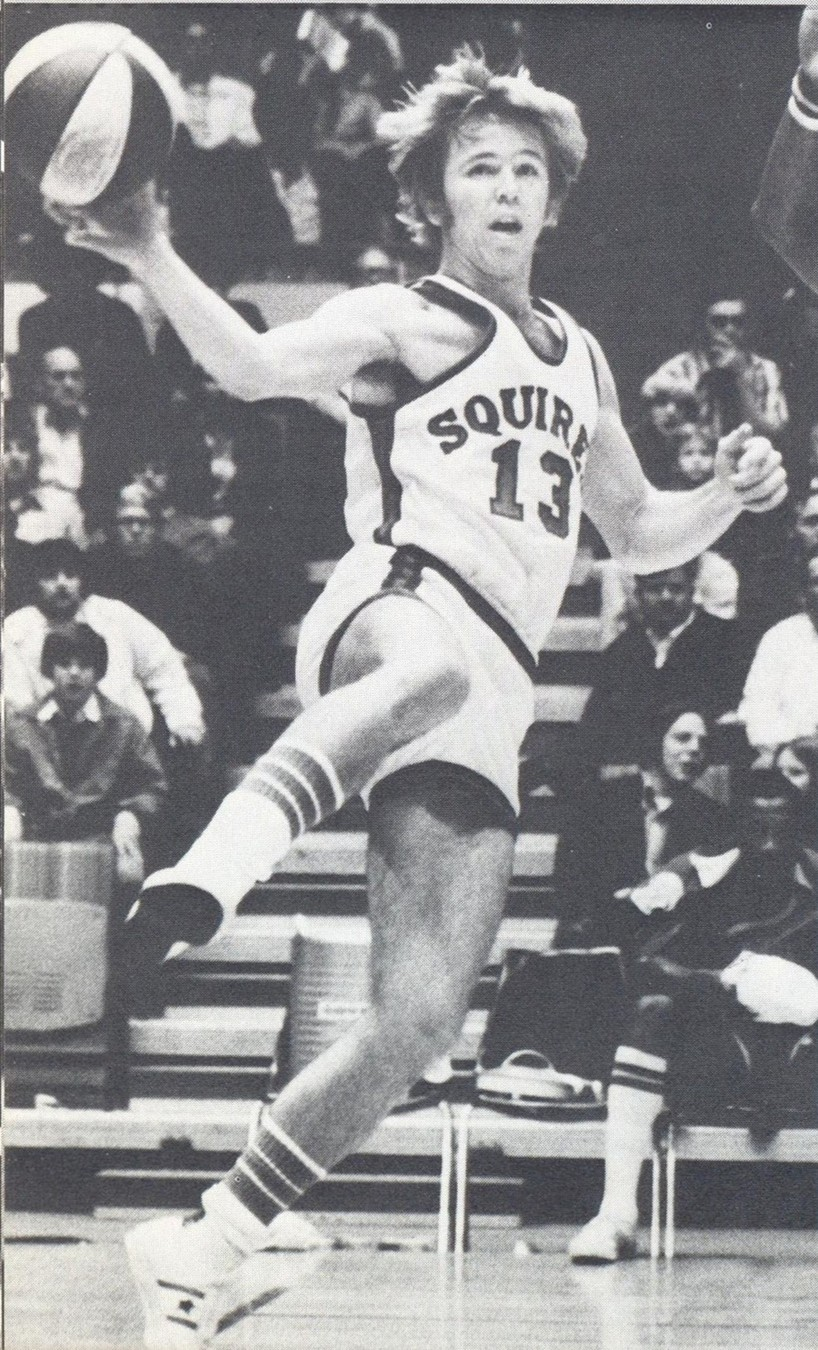
Dave Twardzik was an undrafted player from the 1972 ABA Draft that would see decent success throughout his professional career after signing with the Virginia Squires.

Round	Pick	Player	Pos.	Nationality	Team	School/Club team
1	1	Bob McAdoo^	C	United States	Virginia Squires (from Pittsburgh)	North Carolina (Jr.)
1	Memphis Pros (forfeited #2 pick due to them acquiring Larry Cannon from the Denver Rockets)					
1	2	Tom Riker	C/PF	United States	Carolina Cougars	South Carolina (Sr.)
1	3	Bud Stallworth	SG/SF	United States	Denver Rockets	Kansas (Sr.)
1	4	Dwight Davis	PF	United States	The Floridians	Houston (Sr.)
1	New York Nets (forfeited #5 pick due to them signing Jim Chones, a player previously drafted by the Virginia Squires last year that got invalidated due to draft stipulations at the time)					
1	5	LaRue Martin	C	United States	Dallas Chaparrals	Loyola (Chicago) (Sr.)
1	6	Paul Stovall	SF	United States	Denver Rockets (from Indiana)	Arizona State (Sr.)
1	Virginia Squires (forfeited what would have been the #7 pick due to them signing Julius Erving‡ last year after the previous draft ended)					
1	Utah Stars (forfeited what would have been the new #7 pick due to them signing Jimmy Jones‡ from the Memphis Pros)					
1	7	Corky Calhoun	SF	United States	Kentucky Colonels	Duke (Sr.)
2	8	David Brent^{#}	C/PF	United States	Memphis Pros	Jacksonville (Fr.)
2	9	John Gianelli	C/PF	United States	Pittsburgh Condors	Pacific (Sr.)
2	10	Dennis Wuycik	SF	United States	Carolina Cougars	North Carolina (Sr.)
2	11	Claude Terry^{+}	SG/SF	United States	Denver Rockets	Stanford (Sr.)
2	12	Mike Stewart^{#}	C	United States	The Floridians	Santa Clara (Jr.)
2	13	Bill Chamberlain	SF	United States	New York Nets	North Carolina (Sr.)
2	14	Mike Ratliff	C	United States	Dallas Chaparrals	Wisconsin–Eau Claire (Sr.)
2	15	Chris Ford	SG	United States	Utah Stars	Villanova (Sr.)
2	16	Russ Lee	SG/SF	United States	Memphis Pros (acquired via trade of some sort (probably from Kentucky))	Marshall (Sr.)
3	17	Chuck Terry	SF	United States	Pittsburgh Condors	Long Beach State (Sr.)
3	18	Jim Price	PG	United States	Memphis Pros	Louisville (Sr.)
3	19	Brian Taylor~*	PG	United States	New York Nets (acquired via trade of some sort (probably from Carolina))	Princeton (Sr.)
3	20	Paul Westphal^	PG/SG	United States	Denver Rockets	USC (Sr.)
3	21	Scott English	SF	United States	The Floridians	UTEP (Sr.)
3	22	Joby Wright	PF/C	United States	New York Nets (from The Floridians via New York)	Indiana (Sr.)
3	23	Bob Morse^{#}	SF/PF	United States	Dallas Chaparrals	Pennsylvania (Sr.)
3	24	Oscar Evans^{#}	G	United States	Indiana Pacers	Butler (Sr.)
3	25	Will Franklin	F	United States	Virginia Squires	Purdue (Sr.)
3	26	Travis Grant	SF	United States	Utah Stars	Kentucky State (Sr.)
4	27	Rusty Clair^{#}	C/PF	United States	Memphis Pros	Oregon (Sr.)
4	28	Bob Davis	SF	United States	Pittsburgh Condors	Weber State (Sr.)
4	29	Fred Boyd	PG/SG	United States	Carolina Cougars	Oregon State (Sr.)
4	30	Doug Collins	SG	United States	Denver Rockets	Illinois State (Sr.)
4	31	Greg Starrick^{#}	G	United States	The Floridians	Southern Illinois (Sr.)
4	32	Dwaine Dillard	SF	United States	New York Nets	Eastern Michigan (So.)
4	33	Bill Walton^	C	United States	Dallas Chaparrals	UCLA (So.)
4	34	Art White^{#}	F	United States	New York Nets (acquired via trade of some sort)	Georgetown University (D.C.) (Sr.)
4	35	Chuck Jura^{#}	C	United States	Utah Stars	Nebraska (Sr.)
5	36	Wil Robinson	SG	United States	Pittsburgh Condors	West Virginia (Sr.)
5	37	Dave Bustion	PF	United States	Denver Rockets	Denver (Sr.)
5	38	Bob Lackey	SG	United States	New York Nets	Marquette (Sr.)
5	39	Steve Hawes	C/PF	United States	Dallas Chaparrals	Washington (Sr.)
5	40	Nate Stephens^{#}	C	United States	Indiana Pacers	Long Beach State (Jr.)
5	41	Bob Nash	SF	United States	Utah Stars	Hawaii (Sr.)
5	42	Harold Fox	PG	United States	Pittsburgh Condors (acquired via trade of some sort (probably from Kentucky))	Jacksonville (Sr.)
6	43	Bob Ford	F	United States	Memphis Pros	Purdue (Sr.)
6	44	James Silas*‡	PG	United States	Pittsburgh Condors	Stephen F. Austin (Sr.)
6	45	Steve Bracey	PG	United States	Carolina Cougars	Tulsa (Sr.)
6	46	Sam Sibert	SF	United States	Denver Rockets	Kentucky State (Sr.)
6	47	Charlie Thorpe^{#}	C	United States	The Floridians	Belhaven College (Sr.)
6	48	Ron Harris^{#}	F	United States	New York Nets	Wichita State (Sr.)
6	49	Jim Creighton	PF	United States	Dallas Chaparrals	Colorado (Sr.)
6	50	George Adams	F	United States	Indiana Pacers	Gardner–Webb College (Jr.)
6	51	Reggie Bird^{#}	G	United States	Virginia Squires	Princeton (Sr.)
6	52	Tom Patterson	SF/PF	United States	Utah Stars	Ouachita Baptist (Jr.)
6	53	Matt Gantt^{#}	F	United States	Kentucky Colonels	St. Bonaventure (Sr.)
7	54	Joe Mackey^{#}	F	United States	Pittsburgh Condors	USC (Sr.)
7	55	Rowland Garrett	SF	United States	Memphis Pros	Florida State (Sr.)
7	56	Dan Holcomb^{#}	C	United States	Carolina Cougars	Memphis State (Sr.)
7	57	Ron Riley	PF	United States	Denver Rockets	USC (Sr.)
7	58	Swen Nater~*	C	The Netherlands	The Floridians	UCLA (Jr.)
7	59	Hank Siemiontkowski^{#}	SF/PF	United States	New York Nets	Villanova (Sr.)
7	60	Frank Schade	G	United States	Dallas Chaparrals	Wisconsin–Eau Claire (Sr.)
7	61	Richie Garner^{#}	SG	United States	Indiana Pacers	Manhattan (Sr.)
7	62	Al Sanders	PF	United States	Virginia Squires	LSU (Sr.)
7	63	Eric McWilliams	SF	United States	Utah Stars	Long Beach State (Sr.)
7	64	Bill Kennedy^{#}	G	United States	Kentucky Colonels	Arizona State (Sr.)
8	65	Sam Simmons^{#}	G	United States	Memphis Pros	Bradley (Sr.)
8	66	Marshall Wingate^{#}	G	United States	Pittsburgh Condors	Niagara (Sr.)
8	67	Henry Bibby	PG	United States	Carolina Cougars	UCLA (Sr.)
8	68	Ted Martiniuk^{#}	F	United States	Denver Rockets	Saint Peter's (Sr.)
8	69	Ron Thomas	PF	United States	The Floridians	Louisville (Sr.)
8	70	Walter Jones^{#}	F	United States	New York Nets	LIU Brooklyn (Sr.)
8	71	Ansley Truitt	PF	United States	Dallas Chaparrals	California (Sr.)
8	72	Cavin Andersen^{#}	G	United States	Indiana Pacers	Valley City State (Sr.)
8	73	Billy Shepherd	PG	United States	Virginia Squires	Butler (Sr.)
8	74	Frank Russell	SG	United States	Utah Stars	Detroit (Sr.)
8	75	Terry Benton^{#}	F	United States	Kentucky Colonels	Wichita State (Sr.)
9	76	Charles Edge	SF	United States	Pittsburgh Condors	LeMoyne–Owen (Jr.)
9	77	Steve Davidson^{#}	F	United States	Memphis Pros	West Texas State (Sr.)
9	78	Jerry Crocker^{#}	G	United States	Carolina Cougars	Guilford (Sr.)
9	79	Bernie Fryer	SG	United States	Denver Rockets	BYU (Sr.)
9	80	Ernie Fleming^{#}	F	United States	The Floridians	Jacksonville (Sr.)
9	81	Ed Czernota^{#}	F	United States	New York Nets	Sacred Heart (Sr.)
9	82	Wayne Grabiec^{#}	G	United States	Dallas Chaparrals	Michigan (Sr.)
9	83	Wardell Dyson^{#}	F	United States	Indiana Pacers	Shaw University (Sr.)
9	84	Mike Barr	G	United States	Virginia Squires	Duquesne (Sr.)
9	85	Mike Jackson	PF	United States	Utah Stars	Cal State Los Angeles (Sr.)
9	86	Ernest Pettis^{#}	G	United States	Kentucky Colonels	Western Michigan (Sr.)
10	87	Jackie Young^{#}	G	United States	Memphis Pros	Rocky Mountain (Sr.)
10	88	Bryan Adrian^{#}	G	United States	Pittsburgh Condors	Davidson (Sr.)
10	89	Mike Collins^{#}	F	United States	Carolina Cougars	Seattle (Sr.)
10	90	Jerry Pender	SG	United States	Denver Rockets	Fresno State (Sr.)
10	91	Sam Cash	PF	United States	The Floridians	UC Riverside (Jr.)
10	92	Randy Noll^{#}	F	United States	New York Nets	Marshall (Jr.)
10	93	Jerry Zielinski^{#}	SG/SF	United States	Dallas Chaparrals	Northern Illinois (Sr.)
10	94	Jolly Spight^{#}	G	United States	Indiana Pacers	Santa Clara (Sr.)
10	95	Rick Aydlett^{#}	F	United States	Virginia Squires	South Carolina (Sr.)
10	96	Kevin Porter	PG	United States	Utah Stars	Saint Francis (Jr.)
10	97	Cleveland Hill^{#}	F	United States	Kentucky Colonels	Nicholls State (Sr.)
11	98	Joe Gaines^{#}	F	United States	Pittsburgh Condors	Belmont (Sr.)
11	99	Steve Turner^{#}	C	United States	Memphis Pros	Vanderbilt (Jr.)
11	100	Wilbert Loftin^{#}	F	United States	Carolina Cougars	Southwest Louisiana (Sr.)
11	101	Gary Stewart^{#}	F	United States	Denver Rockets	Canisius (Sr.)
11	102	Tracy Tripucka^{#}	G	United States	The Floridians	Lafayette (Sr.)
11	103	Quinas Brower^{#}	F	United States	New York Nets	Hofstra (Sr.)
11	104	Jeff Hickman^{#}	SG	United States	Dallas Chaparrals	Houston (Sr.)
11	105	Billy Burton^{#}	G	United States	Indiana Pacers	Eastern Kentucky (Sr.)
11	106	Kent Hollenbeck^{#}	G	United States	Virginia Squires	Kentucky (Sr.)
11	107	Willie Hart^{#}	C	United States	Utah Stars	Grambling (Jr.)
11	108	Andrew Pettes^{#}	G	United States	Kentucky Colonels	Oklahoma (Sr.)
12	109	Henry Bacon	SG	United States	Memphis Pros	Louisville (Sr.)
12	110	Chic Downing^{#}	F	United States	Pittsburgh Condors	Benedictine College (Sr.)
12	111	Charles Dudley	PG	United States	Carolina Cougars	Washington (Sr.)
12	112	Michael Reid^{#}	G	United States	Denver Rockets	UC Riverside (So.)
12	113	Jerry Brucks^{#}	C	United States	The Floridians	Wyoming (Sr.)
12	114	Bill Phillips^{#}	C	United States	New York Nets	St. John's (Sr.)
12	115	Stan Key^{#}	G	United States	Dallas Chaparrals	Kentucky (Sr.)
12	116	Wally Rice^{#}	G	United States	Indiana Pacers	PMC Colleges (Sr.)
12	117	Milton Adams^{#}	G	United States	Virginia Squires	Portland (Sr.)
12	118	Lloyd Neal	C/PF	United States	Utah Stars	Tennessee State (Sr.)
12	119	David Hall^{#}	F	United States	Kentucky Colonels	Kansas State (Sr.)
13	120	Billy Pleas^{#}	F	United States	Pittsburgh Condors	Detroit (Sr.)
13	121	Ruppert Breedlove^{#}	C	United States	Memphis Pros	Oglethorpe (Sr.)
13	122	Mike Sneed^{#}	F	United States	Carolina Cougars	Fayetteville State (Sr.)
13	123	John Burks^{#}	F	United States	Denver Rockets	San Francisco (Sr.)
13	124	Bobby Jack^{#}	F	United States	The Floridians	Oklahoma (Sr.)
13	125	Kelly Utley^{#}	G	United States	New York Nets	Shaw University (Sr.)
13	126	Donn Weise^{#}	C	United States	Dallas Chaparrals	Ripon College (Sr.)
13	127	Mel Sims^{#}	G	United States	Indiana Pacers	Cal State Los Angeles (Sr.)
13	128	Ralph Houston	F	United States	Virginia Squires	Houston (Sr.)
13	129	Simpson Degrate^{#}	SG/SF	United States	Utah Stars	TCU (Sr.)
13	130	Jerry Clack^{#}	G	United States	Kentucky Colonels	Oklahoma State (Sr.)
14	131	Sam McCarney^{#}	F	United States	Memphis Pros	Oral Roberts (Sr.)
14	132	David Werthman^{#}	SF	United States	Pittsburgh Condors	West Virginia (Sr.)
14	133	Steve Previs	PG	United States	Carolina Cougars	North Carolina (Sr.)
14	134	John Tschogl	SF	United States	Denver Rockets	UC Santa Barbara (Sr.)
14	135	Greg Flaker^{#}	G	United States	The Floridians	Missouri (Sr.)
14	136	Paul Hoffman^{#}	G	United States	New York Nets	St. Bonaventure (Sr.)
14	137	Rhea Taylor^{#}	SF	United States	Dallas Chaparrals	Arizona State (Sr.)
14	138	Nate Williams^{#}	SF	United States	Indiana Pacers	Utah State (Sr.)
14	139	Rudolph Peele^{#}	G	United States	Virginia Squires	Norfolk State (Sr.)
14	140	Mose Adolph^{#}	G	United States	Utah Stars	Cal State Los Angeles (Sr.)
14	141	Tom Parker^{#}	F	United States	Kentucky Colonels	Kentucky (Sr.)
15	142	Henry Seawright^{#}	G	United States	Pittsburgh Condors	Manhattan (Sr.)
15	143	Gene Mack^{#}	PG	United States	Memphis Pros	Iowa State (Sr.)
15	144	Kent Martens^{#}	C	United States	Carolina Cougars	Abilene Christian (Sr.)
15	145	Leon Huff^{#}	G	United States	Denver Rockets	Drake (Sr.)
15	146	Ray Golson^{#}	G	United States	The Floridians	West Texas State (Sr.)
15	New York Nets (Passed up on using this selection.)					
15	147	Ron Williams^{#}	G	United States	Dallas Chaparrals	Murray State (Sr.)
15	Indiana Pacers (Passed up on using this selection.)					
15	148	Scott McCandlish^{#}	C	United States	Virginia Squires	Virginia (Sr.)
15	149	Harvey Catchings	PF/C	United States	Utah Stars	Hardin–Simmons (So.)
15	150	Jerry Dunn^{#}	F	United States	Kentucky Colonels	Western Kentucky (Sr.)
16	151	Ken May^{#}	F	United States	Memphis Pros	Dayton (Sr.)
16	152	Lee McCullough^{#}	F	United States	Pittsburgh Condors	Indiana (Pennsylvania) (Sr.)
16	153	Rod Behrens^{#}	PF	United States	Carolina Cougars	Samford (Sr.)
16	154	Phillip Sisk^{#}	G	United States	Denver Rockets	Georgia Southern (Sr.)
16	155	Willie Cherry^{#}	F	United States	The Floridians	Denver (Sr.)
16	New York Nets (Passed up on using this selection.)					
16	156	Rich Walker^{#}	G	United States	Dallas Chaparrals	Bowling Green (Sr.)
16	Indiana Pacers (Passed up on using this selection.)					
16	157	Harry Taylor^{#}	G/F	United States	Virginia Squires	Los Angeles Baptist (Sr.)
16	158	Richard Dixon^{#}	G	United States	Utah Stars	Loyola Los Angeles (Sr.)
16	159	Frank Lorthridge^{#}	C/PF	United States	Kentucky Colonels	Pan American (Sr.)
17	160	Harry Anderson^{#}	SG	United States	Pittsburgh Condors	Saint Peter's (Jr.)
17	161	Steve Schmidt^{#}	G	United States	Memphis Pros	South Alabama (Sr.)
17	162	David Smith^{#}	G	United States	Carolina Cougars	Western Carolina (Sr.)
17	163	Dave Hullman^{#}	PF	United States	Denver Rockets	Arizona State (Sr.)
17	164	Arnie Berman^{#}	F	United States	The Floridians	Brown (Sr.)
17	165	Ron Bradley^{#}	G	United States	New York Nets	Eastern Nazarene (Jr.)
17	166	Al Vilcheck^{#}	PF/C	United States	Dallas Chaparrals	Louisville (Sr.)
17	Indiana Pacers (Passed up on using this selection.)					
17	Virginia Squires (Passed up on using this selection.)					
17	167	Henry Steele^{#}	C	United States	Utah Stars	Northeast Louisiana (Sr.)
17	Kentucky Colonels (Passed up on using this selection.)					
18	168	Terry Hankton^{#}	F	United States	Memphis Pros	Arkansas Polytechnic College (Sr.)
18	169	Manuel Raga^{#}	SG	Mexico	Pittsburgh Condors	Ignis Varese (Italy)
18	170	Curtis Pritchett^{#}	F	United States	Carolina Cougars	St. Augustine's (Sr.)
18	171	Harold Little^{#}	SG/SF	United States	Denver Rockets	New Mexico (Sr.)
18	172	Fred DeVaughn^{#}	F	United States	The Floridians	Westmont (Jr.)
18	New York Nets (Passed up on using this selection.)					
18	Dallas Chaparrals (Passed up on using this selection.)					
18	Indiana Pacers (Passed up on using this selection.)					
18	Virginia Squires (Passed up on using this selection.)					
18	173	Dwight Holiday^{#}	SG	United States	Utah Stars	Hawaii (Sr.)
18	Kentucky Colonels (Passed up on using this selection.)					
19	Pittsburgh Condors (Passed up on using this selection.)					
19	Memphis Pros (Passed up on using this selection.)					
19	174	Paul Coder^{#}	C	United States	Carolina Cougars	NC State (Sr.)
19	175	Andy Knowles^{#}	PG	United States	Denver Rockets	Louisiana Tech (Sr.)
19	176	Bob Zender^{#}	F	United States	The Floridians	Kansas State (Sr.)
19	New York Nets (Passed up on using this selection.)					
19	Dallas Chaparrals (Passed up on using this selection.)					
19	Indiana Pacers (Passed up on using this selection.)					
19	Virginia Squires (Passed up on using this selection.)					
19	177	George Price^{#}	G	United States	Utah Stars	Colorado State (Sr.)
19	Kentucky Colonels (Passed up on using this selection.)					
20	Memphis Pros (Passed up on using this selection.)					
20	Pittsburgh Condors (Passed up on using this selection.)					
20	Carolina Cougars (Passed up on using this selection.)					
20	178	Al Davis^{#}	F	United States	Denver Rockets	Hawaii (Sr.)
20	The Floridians (Passed up on using this selection.)					
20	New York Nets (Passed up on using this selection.)					
20	Dallas Chaparrals (Passed up on using this selection.)					
20	Indiana Pacers (Passed up on using this selection.)					
20	Virginia Squires (Passed up on using this selection.)					
20	179	George Bryant^{#}	PG	United States	Utah Stars	Eastern Kentucky (Sr.)
20	Kentucky Colonels (Passed up on using this selection.)					

=== Notable undrafted players ===
These players were officially considered draft eligible for the 1972 ABA draft and went undrafted this year, yet played at least one regular season or playoff game for the ABA before the ABA-NBA merger actually commenced a few years later.

Player	Pos.	Nationality	School
Don Buse*	PG	United States	Evansville (Sr.)
Bill Newton	PF/C	United States	LSU (Sr.)
Dave Twardzik^{+}	PG	United States	Old Dominion (Sr.)

=== 1972 ABA dispersal draft ===
On July 13, 1972, two of the ABA's eleven inaugural teams in "The Floridians" and the Pittsburgh Condors would have their players be dispersed in the first dispersal draft in the ABA's history. This dispersal draft would involve all of the original ABA teams that remained alive and kicking at the time, but it would not include the San Diego Conquistadors expansion team since their creation was done after the dispersal draft happened. This draft would also be considered the debut drafting period of the Memphis Tams under their newly rebranded name. There would be six total rounds of draft picks from this dispersal draft that the nine ABA teams that were left over at the time would utilize from taking either "The Floridians" or Pittsburgh Condors players that were available for themselves. Any players that weren't selected after this draft concluded would be placed on waivers and enter free agency afterward. Interestingly enough, the Denver Rockets were the only ABA team to select players from only one of the two defunct franchises, with them opting to select players only from "The Floridians" franchise instead of either both franchises like every other team here did or even just players from the Pittsburgh Condors only. Outside of that note, the following teams would select these players from either "The Floridians" or the Pittsburgh Condors franchises, with parentheses showcasing the original team they were either on or had the player rights to at the time before the dispersal draft commenced unless directly stated otherwise.

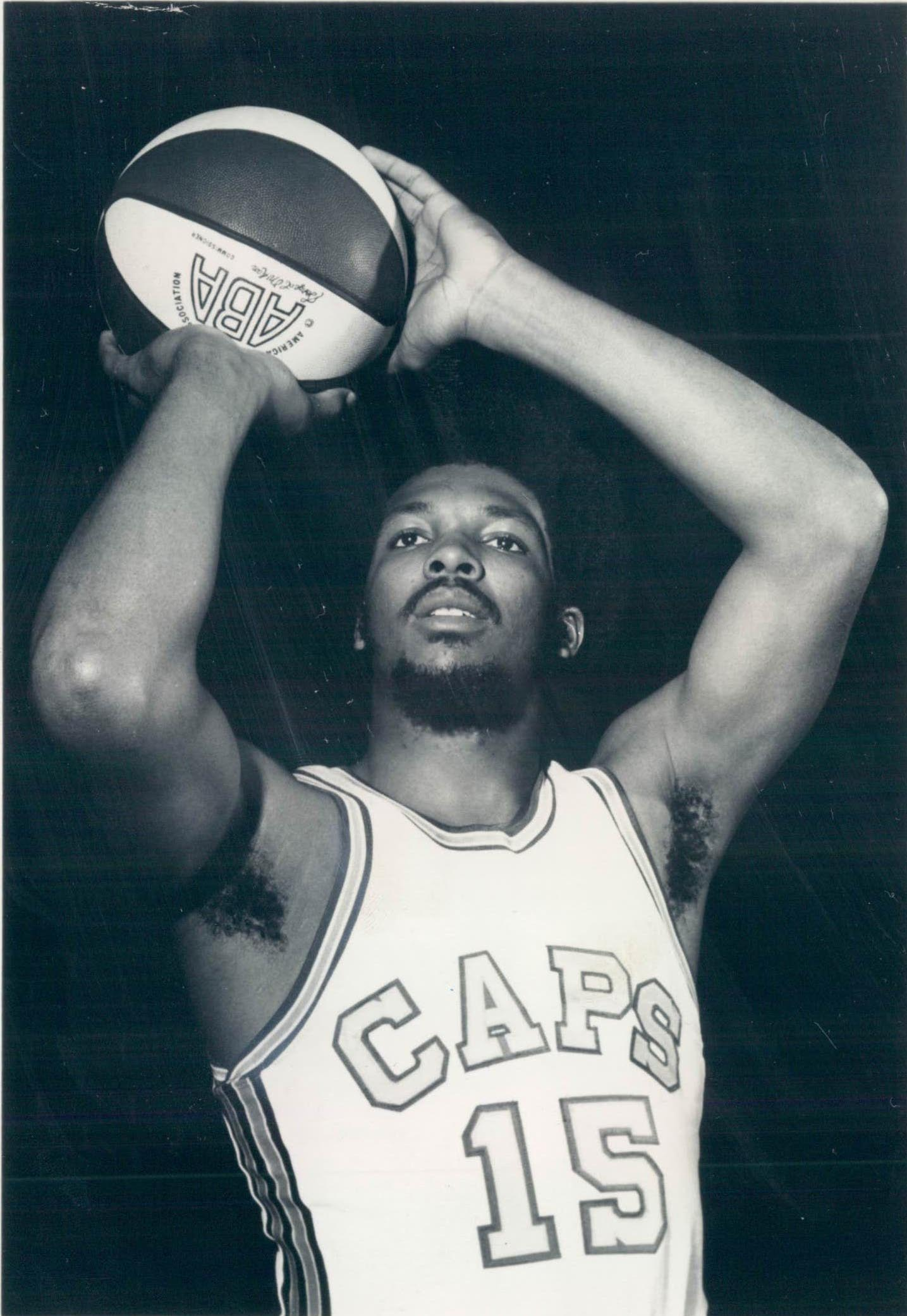
Warren Jabali was selected second in the first round of the 1972 ABA dispersal draft by going from "The Floridians" to the Denver Rockets.

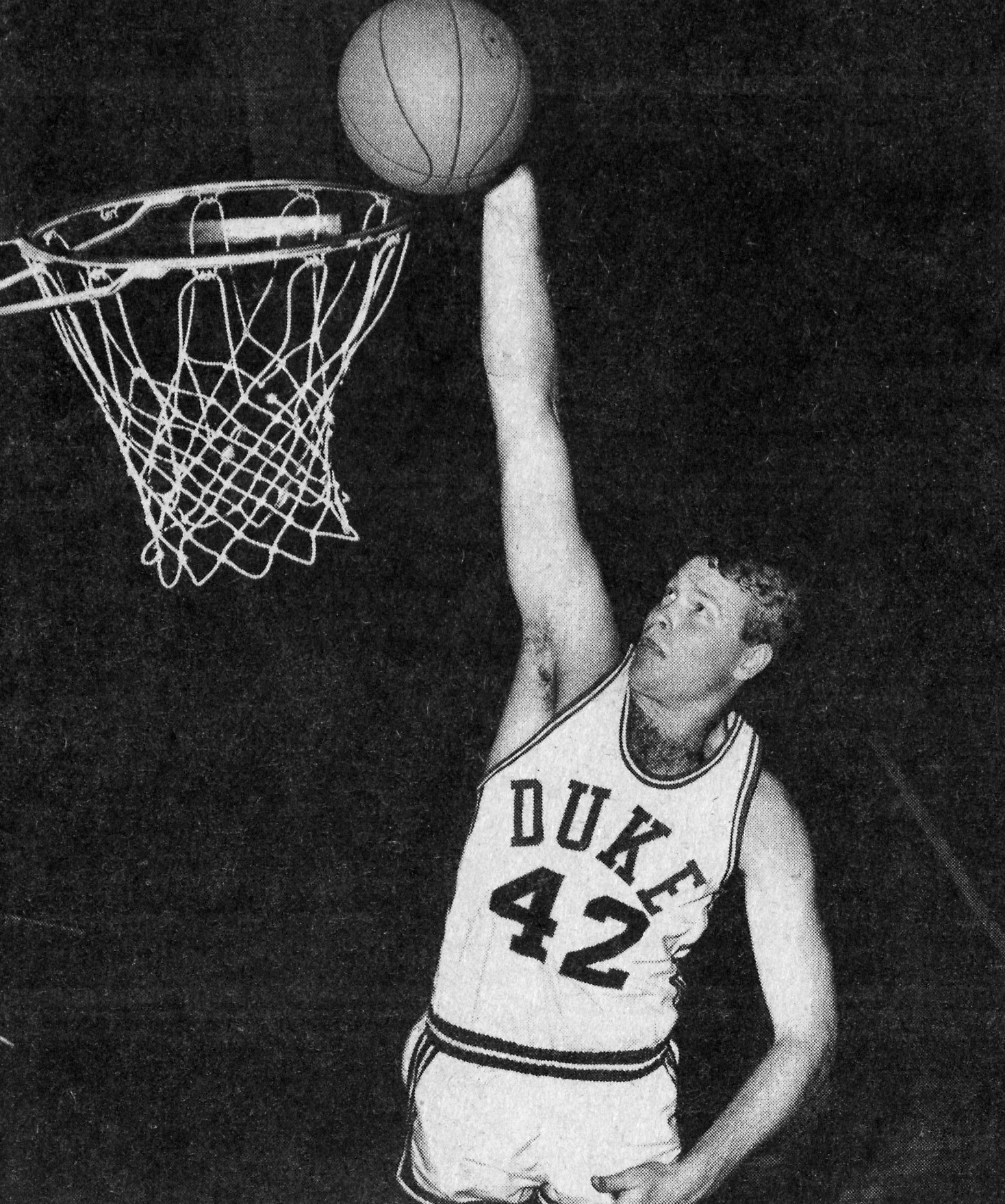
Mike Lewis was selected third in the first round of the 1972 ABA dispersal draft by going from the Pittsburgh Condors to the Carolina Cougars.

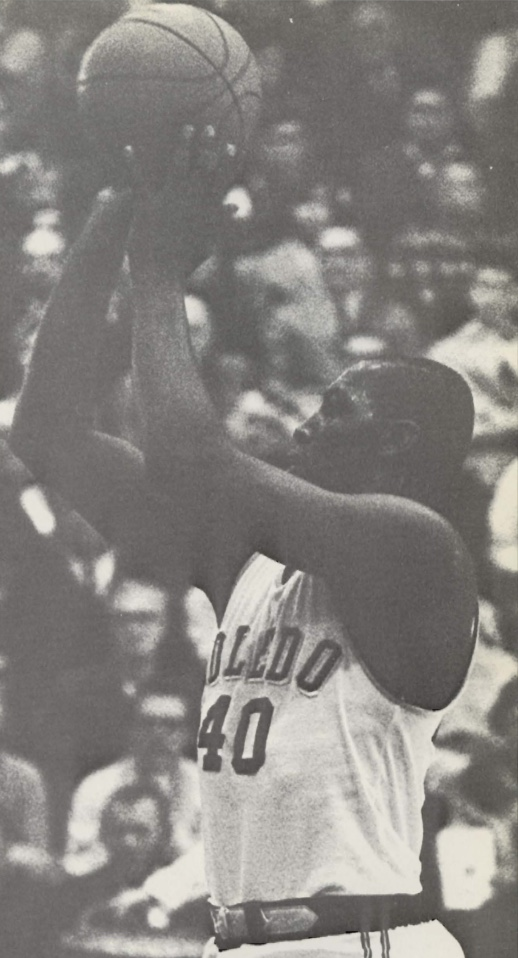
John Brisker was selected fourth in the first round of the 1972 ABA dispersal draft by going from the Pittsburgh Condors to the Dallas Chaparrals.

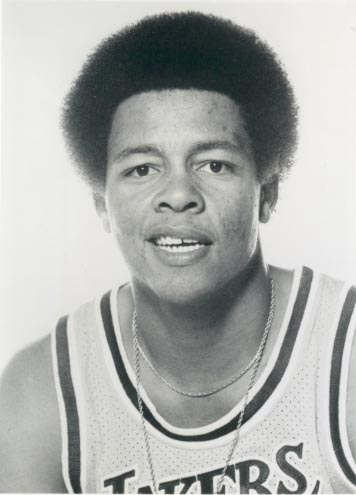
Mack Calvin was selected sixth in the first round of the 1972 ABA dispersal draft by going from "The Floridians" to the Carolina Cougars.

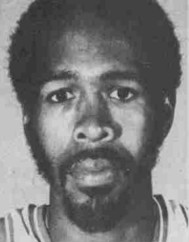
Larry Jones was selected tenth in the first round of the 1972 ABA dispersal draft by going from "The Floridians" to the Utah Stars.

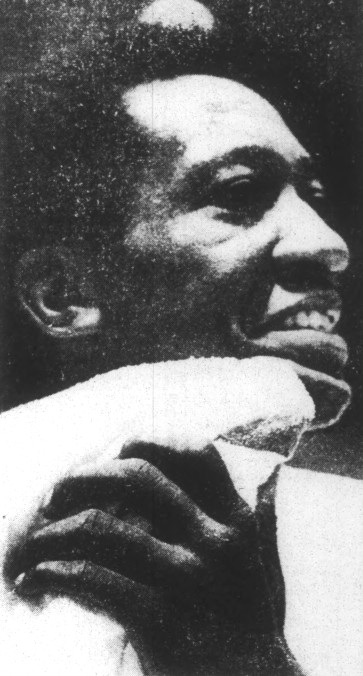
Jim Ligon was selected 34th overall (fourth in the fourth round) in the 1972 ABA dispersal draft by going from the Pittsburgh Condors to the Virginia Squires.

Rnd.	Pick	Player	Pos.	Nationality	New Team	School	Former Team
1	1	George Thompson^{+}	PG	United States	Memphis Tams	Marquette	Pittsburgh Condors
1	2	Warren Jabali*‡	SG/PG	United States	Denver Rockets	Wichita State	The Floridians
1	3	Mike Lewis^{+}	PF/C	United States	Carolina Cougars	Duke	Pittsburgh Condors
1	4	John Brisker	SF/SG	United States	Dallas Chaparrals	Toledo	Pittsburgh Condors
1	5	Skeeter Swift	SG	United States	Dallas Chaparrals	East Tennessee State	Pittsburgh Condors
1	6	Mack Calvin*‡	PG	United States	Carolina Cougars	USC	The Floridians
1	7	Willie Long	SF/PF	United States	Denver Rockets	New Mexico	The Floridians
1	8	Ron Franz	SF	United States	Memphis Tams	Kansas	The Floridians
1	9	Swen Nater~*	C	The Netherlands	Virginia Squires	UCLA	The Floridians
1	10	Larry Jones*	PG/SG	United States	Utah Stars	Toledo	The Floridians
1	11	Walt Szczerbiak	SF	United States; West Germany	Kentucky Colonels	George Washington	Pittsburgh Condors
1	12	Chuck Terry	SF	United States	New York Nets	Long Beach State	Pittsburgh Condors
1	13	Dwight Davis	PF	United States	Indiana Pacers	Houston	The Floridians
2	14	Dave Lattin	PF/C	United States	Memphis Tams	UTEP	Pittsburgh Condors
2	15	Scott English	SF	United States	Denver Rockets	UTEP	The Floridians
2	16	Mike Stewart^{#}	C	United States	Carolina Cougars	Santa Clara	The Floridians
2	17	John Gianelli	C/PF	United States	Dallas Chaparrals	Pacific	Pittsburgh Condors
2	18	Joe Mackey^{#}	F	United States	Virginia Squires	USC	Pittsburgh Condors
2	19	Chic Downing^{#}	F	United States	Utah Stars	Benedictine College	Pittsburgh Condors
2	20	Ernie Fleming^{#}	F	United States	Kentucky Colonels	Jacksonville	The Floridians
2	21	Dwight Jones	PF/C	United States	Indiana Pacers	Houston	The Floridians
3	22	Sam Cash	PF	United States	Memphis Tams	UC Riverside	The Floridians
3	23	Al Tucker	SF	United States	Denver Rockets	Oklahoma Baptist	The Floridians
3	24	Mike Grosso	C	United States	Carolina Cougars	Louisville	Pittsburgh Condors
3	25	Jerry Brucks^{#}	C	United States	Dallas Chaparrals	Wyoming	The Floridians
3	26	Craig Raymond	C	United States	Virginia Squires	BYU	The Floridians
3	27	Wil Robinson	SG	United States	Utah Stars	West Virginia	Pittsburgh Condors
3	28	Lonnie Wright	SG/PG	United States	Kentucky Colonels	Colorado State	The Floridians
3	29	George Tinsley	SF	United States	New York Nets	Kentucky Wesleyan	The Floridians
3	30	Tracy Tripucka^{#}	G	United States	Indiana Pacers	Lafayette	The Floridians
4	31	Ron Thomas	PF	United States	Memphis Tams	Louisville	The Floridians
4	32	Greg Starrick^{#}	G	United States	Carolina Cougars	Southern Illinois	The Floridians
4	33	Bobby Jack^{#}	F	United States	Dallas Chaparrals	Oklahoma	The Floridians
4	34	Jim Ligon^{+}	PF/C	United States	Virginia Squires	Kokomo High School (Kokomo, Indiana)	Pittsburgh Condors
4	35	Henry Seawright^{#}	G	United States	Utah Stars	Manhattan	Pittsburgh Condors
4	36	Greg Flaker^{#}	G	United States	Kentucky Colonels	Missouri	The Floridians
4	37	Brian Adrian^{#}	G	United States	Indiana Pacers	Davidson	Pittsburgh Condors
5	38	Charles Edge	SF	United States	Memphis Tams	LeMoyne–Owen	Pittsburgh Condors
5	39	Greg Lowery^{#}	G	United States	Virginia Squires	Texas Tech	The Floridians
5	40	Billy Pleas^{#}	F	United States	Utah Stars	Detroit	Pittsburgh Condors
6	41	Ray Golson^{#}	G	United States	Memphis Tams	West Texas State	The Floridians
6	42	Al Davis^{#}	F	United States	Virginia Squires	Hawaii	The Floridians

=== 1972 ABA expansion draft ===
Following the dispersal draft of "The Floridians" and Pittsburgh Condors franchises, the ABA would host their first and only expansion draft in league history with the San Diego Conquistadors taking on one of the replacement spots for either "The Floridians" or the Pittsburgh Condors since both franchises, coincidentally enough, previously looked at San Diego as a relocation option before folding operations altogether. The expansion draft for the San Diego Conquistadors would take place on August 10, 1972, almost a month after the dispersal draft had concluded, with the Conquistadors being allowed to have two selections of players in essentially one total round (but really two rounds) from the nine remaining inaugural ABA teams at hand. However, the Indiana Pacers would later negotiate a deal with San Diego to only allow them to acquire the negating draft rights to Dwight Jones alongside George Peeples instead of two of their actual players on their end. In any case, Mike Barrett of the Virginia Squires would be named the #1 pick for the San Diego Conquistadors during the expansion draft. Alongside those particular notes of interest, the following players would be selected by the Conquistadors for the franchise's expansion draft.

San Diego Conquistadors
Expansion draft roster:

- Round 1: Stew Johnson, Carolina Cougars
- Round 1: George E. Johnson, Dallas Chaparrals
- Round 1: Art Becker, Denver Rockets
- Round 1: George Peeples, Indiana Pacers
- Round 1: Les Hunter, Kentucky Colonels
- Round 1: Don Sidle, Memphis Tams
- Round 1: Ollie Taylor, New York Nets
- Round 1: Red Robbins, Utah Stars
- Round 1: Mike Barrett, Virginia Squires
- Round 2: Larry Miller, Carolina Cougars
- Round 2: Simmie Hill, Dallas Chaparrals
- Round 2: Chuck Williams, Denver Rockets
- Round 2: Draft rights to Dwight Jones, Indiana Pacers
- Round 2: Lonnie Wright, Kentucky Colonels
- Round 2: Charlie Williams, Memphis Tams
- Round 2: Gene Moore, New York Nets
- Round 2: Mike Butler, Utah Stars
- Round 2: Craig Raymond, Virginia Squires
