= Mark Minor =

American basketball player (born 1950)

Personal information
- Born: May 14, 1950 (age 76)
- Listed height: 6 ft 6 in (1.98 m)
- Listed weight: 215 lb (98 kg)

Career information
- High school: Solon (Solon, Ohio)
- College: Ohio State (1969–1972)
- NBA draft: 1972: 11th round, 165th overall pick
- Drafted by: Boston Celtics
- Position: Small forward
- Number: 20

Career history
- 1972–1973: Boston Celtics
- Stats at NBA.com
- Stats at Basketball Reference

Mark William Minor (born May 14, 1950) is an American former National Basketball Association (NBA) player. Minor was drafted with the ninth pick in the eleventh round of the 1972 NBA draft by the Boston Celtics. In the 1972–73 NBA season, Minor appeared in four games for the Celtics, averaging 1.3 points and 1 rebound per game.

== Career statistics ==
Legend
| GP | Games played | GS | Games started | MPG | Minutes per game |
| FG% | Field goal percentage | 3P% | 3-point field goal percentage | FT% | Free throw percentage |
| RPG | Rebounds per game | APG | Assists per game | SPG | Steals per game |
| BPG | Blocks per game | PPG | Points per game | **Bold** | Career high |

=== NBA ===
==== Regular season ====
| Year | Team | GP | MPG | FG% | FT% | RPG | APG | PPG |
|---|---|---|---|---|---|---|---|---|
| 1972–73 | Boston | 4 | 5.0 | .250 | .750 | 1.0 | .5 | 1.3 |
