= Bill Newton (basketball) =

American basketball player

Personal information
- Born: December 20, 1950 (age 75) Rockville, Indiana, U.S.
- Listed height: 6 ft 9 in (2.06 m)
- Listed weight: 220 lb (100 kg)

Career information
- High school: Rockville (Rockville, Indiana)
- College: LSU (1969–1972)
- NBA draft: 1972: undrafted
- Playing career: 1972–1974
- Position: Power forward / center
- Number: 24

Career history
- 1972–1974: Indiana Pacers

Career highlights
- ABA champion (1973)
- Stats at Basketball Reference

Bill R. Newton (born December 22, 1950) is an American former basketball player. A power forward–center, he played two seasons in the American Basketball Association (NBA) as a member of the Indiana Pacers during the 1972–73 and 1973–74 seasons. Born in Rockville, Indiana, he attended Louisiana State University and played for coach Press Maravich.

While at Louisiana State, he amassed 1,339 career points & 802 career rebounds. He finished his career as the school's 4th all-time leading rebounder. While at LSU, he helped lead them to the 1970 NIT Final Four, was a 2-time ALL-SEC selection, team captain & MVP his senior year (1971–72). He participated in 1972 U.S. Olympic trials and was selected as an alternate. He was named to LSU's 1970s All-Decade Team.

In 2013, he was inducted into the Indiana Basketball Hall of Fame He attended Rockville, Indiana High School, leading the Rox to a record of 19-3 and a Wabash River Conference title his senior season (1967–68). He led the state of Indiana in rebounding (22.0 rbs/game) his senior season.
