= Jim Creighton (basketball) =

American basketball player (born 1950)

Personal information
- Born: April 18, 1950 (age 76) Billings, Montana, U.S.
- Listed height: 6 ft 8 in (2.03 m)
- Listed weight: 200 lb (91 kg)

Career information
- High school: North (Denver, Colorado)
- College: Colorado (1969–1972)
- NBA draft: 1972: 3rd round, 40th overall pick
- Drafted by: Seattle SuperSonics
- Playing career: 1975–1976
- Position: Power forward
- Number: 24

Career history
- 1975–1976: Atlanta Hawks

Career highlights
- First-team All-Big Eight (1972)
- Stats at NBA.com
- Stats at Basketball Reference

Jim Creighton (born April 18, 1950) is an American former professional basketball player who played briefly in the National Basketball Association (NBA).

A 6'8" forward, Creighton played college basketball for the Colorado Buffaloes from 1969 to 1972, scoring 1,032 points in his college career. He was selected by the Seattle SuperSonics with the 40th pick of the 1972 NBA draft, but he did not reach the NBA until the 1975–76 season, when he played 32 games for the Atlanta Hawks. He scored 31 points in his only NBA season.

== Career statistics ==
Legend
GP	Games played	GS	Games started	MPG	Minutes per game
FG%	Field goal percentage	3P%	3-point field goal percentage	FT%	Free throw percentage
RPG	Rebounds per game	APG	Assists per game	SPG	Steals per game
BPG	Blocks per game	PPG	Points per game	**Bold**	Career high

=== NBA ===
==== Regular season ====
Year	Team	GP	MPG	FG%	FT%	RPG	APG	SPG	BPG	PPG
1975–76	Atlanta	32	5.4	.279	.438	1.4	.1	.1	.3	1.0
