= Jerry Pender =

American basketball player

Personal information
- Born: February 12, 1950 (age 76)
- Listed height: 6 ft 2 in (1.88 m)
- Listed weight: 185 lb (84 kg)

Career information
- College: Merced College (1968–1970); Fresno State (1970–1972)
- NBA draft: 1972: 7th round, 112th overall pick
- Drafted by: Chicago Bulls
- Position: Shooting guard
- Number: 14

Career history
- 1973: San Diego Conquistadors

Career highlights
- 2× First-team All-PCAA (1971, 1972); First-team All-CVC (1970)
- Stats at Basketball Reference

Jerry Lee Pender (born February 12, 1950) is an American former professional basketball player. He played in 11 games for the San Diego Conquistadors of the American Basketball Association in the first part of the 1973–74 season. He recorded 27 points, 5 rebounds, and 4 assists in his brief career.
