= Henry Bacon (basketball) =

American basketball player

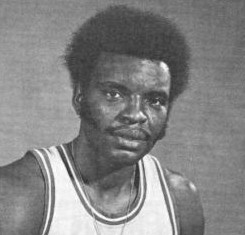

Personal information
- Born: July 5, 1948 (age 78) Louisville, Kentucky
- Listed height: 6 ft 3 in (1.91 m)
- Listed weight: 205 lb (93 kg)

Career information
- High school: Louisville Male (Louisville, Kentucky)
- College: Louisville (1969–1972)
- NBA draft: 1972: 6th round, 93rd overall pick
- Drafted by: Golden State Warriors
- Playing career: 1972–1973
- Position: Shooting guard
- Number: 14

Career history
- 1972–1973: San Diego Conquistadors

Career highlights
- Third-team Parade All-American (1968)
- Stats at Basketball Reference

William Henry Bacon (born July 5, 1948) is an American former basketball player. He played collegiately for the University of Louisville.

Bacon was selected by the Golden State Warriors in the fifth round (73rd pick overall) of the 1972 NBA draft, and by the Memphis Pros in the 1972 ABA Draft. He played for the San Diego Conquistadors (1972–73) in the ABA for 47 games.
