= John Tschogl =

American basketball player

Personal information
- Born: April 25, 1950 (age 76) Chula Vista, California, U.S.
- Listed height: 6 ft 6 in (1.98 m)
- Listed weight: 206 lb (93 kg)

Career information
- High school: Hilltop (Chula Vista, California)
- College: UC Santa Barbara (1969–1972)
- NBA draft: 1972: 4th round, 60th overall pick
- Drafted by: Golden State Warriors
- Position: Small forward
- Number: 22, 26

Career history
- 1973–1974: Atlanta Hawks
- 1974–1975: Philadelphia 76ers

Career highlights
- 3× First-team All-PCAA (1970–1972)
- Stats at NBA.com
- Stats at Basketball Reference

John Mark Tschogl (born April 25, 1950) is an American former professional basketball player who played three seasons in the National Basketball Association (NBA) as a member of the Atlanta Hawks (1972–74) and the Philadelphia 76ers (1974–75). He was drafted by the Golden State Warriors during the 1972 NBA draft, but was waived before the start of the season. A small forward, he attended the University of California, Santa Barbara.

Tschogl attended Hilltop High School in Chula Vista, California, where he played basketball for the Lancers and graduated in 1968. As a junior, he set the school record with 24 rebounds in a win against Escondido in January 1967. He was named the Metro League MVP after leading the league in scoring with 19.4 points per game. Tschogl repeated as the Metro League MVP as a senior and received scholarship offers from over 45 school, ultimately committing to UC Santa Barbara. He was a three-year starter at UCSB.

Tschogl was drafted by the Golden State Warriors in the fourth round of the 1972 NBA draft and played with the team during the presason. He scored eight points in eight minutes against the Los Angeles Lakers in a at The Forum. The next night, the Warriors played the Lakers again at the San Diego Sports Arena. In Tschogl's homecoming, he recorded six points and nine rebounds in 22 minutes in the 120–113 loss, twice blocking Jim McMillian. Tschogl was released the next day.

After working as a house painter and playing amateur basketball in San Diego, Tschogl signed a free agent deal with the Atlanta Hawks in February 1973. He was traded to the Philadelphia 76ers in August 1974 as the first acquisition of new general manager Pat Williams.

== Career statistics ==
Legend
GP	Games played	GS	Games started	MPG	Minutes per game
FG%	Field goal percentage	3P%	3-point field goal percentage	FT%	Free throw percentage
RPG	Rebounds per game	APG	Assists per game	SPG	Steals per game
BPG	Blocks per game	PPG	Points per game	**Bold**	Career high

=== NBA ===
==== Regular season ====
Year	Team	GP	GS	MPG	FG%	FT%	RPG	APG	SPG	BPG	PPG
1972–73	Atlanta	10		9.4	.350	.500	2.1	.6			3.0
1973–74	Atlanta	**64**		7.8	.355	.588	1.2	.5	.3	.3	2.0
1974–75	Philadelphia	39	14	**16.0**	**.358**	**.591**	**2.8**	**.8**	**.6**	**.6**	**3.1**
Career		113	14	10.8	.356	.581	1.8	.6	.4	.4	2.5

==== Playoffs ====
Year	Team	GP	MPG	FG%	FT%	RPG	APG	PPG
1973	Atlanta	3	3.7	.625	–	1.3	.3	3.3
