= Bob Davis (basketball player) =

American basketball player (born 1950)

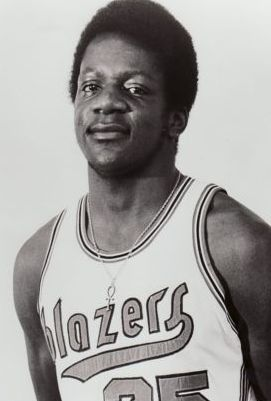
- Davis as a member of the Portland Trail Blazers

Personal information
- Born: April 2, 1950 (age 76)
- Listed height: 6 ft 7 in (2.01 m)
- Listed weight: 215 lb (98 kg)

Career information
- College: Canton Tech JC (1968–1970); Weber State (1970–1972)
- NBA draft: 1972: 2nd round, 14th overall pick
- Drafted by: Portland Trail Blazers
- Position: Small forward
- Number: 25

Career history
- 1972–1973: Portland Trail Blazers
- Stats at NBA.com
- Stats at Basketball Reference

Robert Davis (born April 2, 1950) is an American former professional basketball small forward who played one season in the National Basketball Association (NBA) as a member of the Portland Trail Blazers during the 1972–73 season. He attended Weber State University and was selected by the Blazers during the second round (14^{th} pick overall) of the 1972 NBA draft.

== Career statistics ==
Legend
GP	Games played	GS	Games started	MPG	Minutes per game
FG%	Field goal percentage	3P%	3-point field goal percentage	FT%	Free throw percentage
RPG	Rebounds per game	APG	Assists per game	SPG	Steals per game
BPG	Blocks per game	PPG	Points per game	**Bold**	Career high

=== NBA ===
==== Regular season ====
Year	Team	GP	MPG	FG%	FT%	RPG	APG	PPG
1972–73	Portland	9	4.6	.214	.667	.6	.2	1.8
