= Frank Schade =

American basketball player (born 1950)

Personal information
- Born: January 22, 1950 (age 76) Wausau, Wisconsin, U.S.
- Listed height: 6 ft 1 in (1.85 m)
- Listed weight: 170 lb (77 kg)

Career information
- High school: Wausau (Wausau, Wisconsin)
- College: Wisconsin–Eau Claire (1969–1972)
- NBA draft: 1972: 4th round, 53rd overall pick
- Drafted by: Kansas City–Omaha Kings
- Playing career: 1972–1973
- Position: Point guard
- Number: 15
- Coaching career: 1986–2017

Career history

Playing
- 1972–1973: Kansas City–Omaha Kings

Coaching
- 1986–2017: Oshkosh North HS
- Stats at NBA.com
- Stats at Basketball Reference

Frank Schade (born January 22, 1950) is an American former professional basketball player and coach.

As a high school junior, Schade played on the Wausau High School Lumberjacks team which finished as runners-up in the 1967 WIAA Boys Basketball Championship.

While recruited to play for coach Don Haskins at Texas Western (now the University of Texas at El Paso), he elected to stay in Wisconsin to attend the University of Wisconsin–Eau Claire where he scored 1599 points from 1969 to 1972. In his final year at Eau Claire, the Blugolds finished as NAIA national runners-up to Kentucky State University.

Schade was selected in the 1972 NBA draft by the Kansas City–Omaha Kings, and played nine games with the team in the 1972–73 NBA season.

In 2012, Schade earned his 500th victory as a coach at Oshkosh North High School. He is the winningest coach in Wisconsin boys basketball history to not have won a state championship.

In 2017, Schade earned his 600th victory as a coach. After the 2017 season, Schade announced he would retire as the boys basketball coach at Oshkosh North after 31 years. Schade compiled five state tournament appearances and five conference titles at Oshkosh North while playing in the Fox Valley Association, one of the best leagues in the state of Wisconsin. Before coaching at Oshkosh North he was the head basketball coach at Plymouth High School where he coached for 11 seasons. Schade finished with a career record of 609-316 (437–234 at North)(172–82 at Plymouth) ranking fourth in total wins in the state of Wisconsin when he retired. A year after Schade retired, Oshkosh North won its first state boys basketball championship in school history.

== Career statistics ==
Legend
GP	Games played	GS	Games started	MPG	Minutes per game
FG%	Field goal percentage	3P%	3-point field goal percentage	FT%	Free throw percentage
RPG	Rebounds per game	APG	Assists per game	SPG	Steals per game
BPG	Blocks per game	PPG	Points per game	**Bold**	Career high

=== NBA ===
==== Regular season ====
Year	Team	GP	MPG	FG%	FT%	RPG	APG	PPG
1972–73	Kansas City–Omaha	9	8.4	.286	1.000	.7	1.1	1.1
