= Steve Previs =

American basketball player

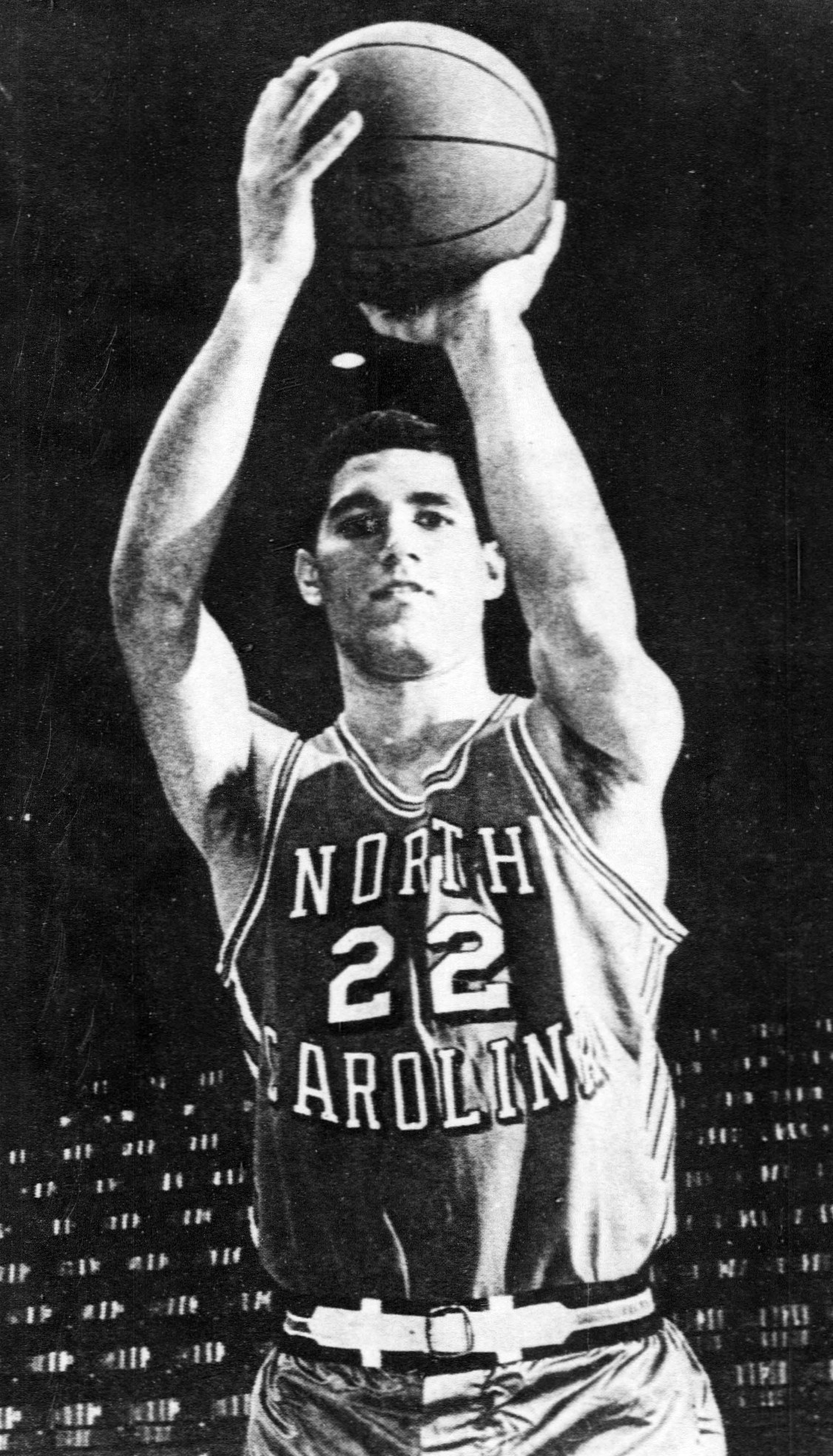
- Previs, circa 1968

Personal information
- Born: February 9, 1950 (age 76) Bethel Park, Pennsylvania, U.S.
- Listed height: 6 ft 3 in (1.91 m)
- Listed weight: 183 lb (83 kg)

Career information
- High school: Bethel Park (Bethel Park, Pennsylvania)
- College: North Carolina (1969–1972)
- NBA draft: 1972: 7th round, 111th overall pick
- Drafted by: Boston Celtics
- Position: Point guard
- Number: 14

Career history
- 1972–1973: Carolina Cougars
- Stats at Basketball Reference

Stephen Richard Previs (born February 9, 1950, in Bethel Park, Pennsylvania) is an American former basketball player who spent one season in the American Basketball Association (ABA) as a member of the Carolina Cougars during the 1972–73 season. The point guard attended University of North Carolina where he was drafted by the Boston Celtics during the 1972 NBA draft, but he did not play for them.
