= Mike Ratliff =

American basketball player (born 1951)

Personal information
- Born: June 7, 1951 New Albany, Mississippi, U.S.
- Died: June 28, 2019 (aged 68)
- Listed height: 6 ft 10 in (2.08 m)
- Listed weight: 230 lb (104 kg)

Career information
- High school: William Horlick (Racine, Wisconsin)
- College: Wisconsin–Eau Claire (1968–1972)
- NBA draft: 1972: 2nd round, 28th overall pick
- Drafted by: Kansas City–Omaha Kings
- Playing career: 1972–1978
- Position: Center
- Number: 43

Career history
- 1972–1973: Kansas City-Omaha Kings
- 1973–1975: Basket Brescia
- 1975–1978: Alsace de Bagnolet
- 1978: Éveil Monceau
- Stats at NBA.com
- Stats at Basketball Reference

Michael D. Ratliff (June 7, 1951 – June 28, 2019) was an American former professional basketball player in the National Basketball Association (NBA). He played with the Kansas City-Omaha Kings. Ratliff attended William Horlick High School in Racine, Wisconsin and the University of Wisconsin–Eau Claire.

== College career ==
Ratliff played basketball at UW-Eau Claire, where he broke multiple records of both the university and the Wisconsin Intercollegiate Athletic Conference. During his four-year career, he was named conference player of the year three times — becoming the only men's basketball player in WIAC history to hold that distinction. His 1,492 career rebounds are the most in the conference's history.

Ratliff helped lead the Blugolds to a 94-14 record during his career. His teams played at the NAIA national tournament three times, finishing as national runner-up in 1972. He was named a first team All-American by the NAIA in 1972.

== Career statistics ==
Legend
GP	Games played	GS	Games started	MPG	Minutes per game
FG%	Field goal percentage	3P%	3-point field goal percentage	FT%	Free throw percentage
RPG	Rebounds per game	APG	Assists per game	SPG	Steals per game
BPG	Blocks per game	PPG	Points per game	**Bold**	Career high

=== NBA ===
==== Regular season ====
Year	Team	GP	MPG	FG%	FT%	RPG	APG	SPG	BPG	PPG
1972–73	Kansas City–Omaha	**58**	**11.7**	**.417**	**.536**	**3.3**	**.7**			**4.2**
1973–74	Kansas City–Omaha	2	2.0	–	–	.0	.0	.0	.0	.0
Career		60	11.4	.417	.536	3.2	.6	.0	.0	4.0
