= Sam Sibert =

American basketball player (born 1949)

Personal information
- Born: February 11, 1949 (age 77) McCormick, South Carolina, U.S.
- Listed height: 6 ft 7 in (2.01 m)
- Listed weight: 215 lb (98 kg)

Career information
- High school: Crane (Chicago, Illinois)
- College: Eastern Oklahoma State (1968–1970); Texas Tech (1970–1971); Kentucky State (1971–1972)
- NBA draft: 1972: 2nd round, 19th overall pick
- Drafted by: Kansas City–Omaha Kings
- Playing career: 1972–1973
- Position: Power forward
- Number: 25

Career history
- 1972–1973: Kansas City-Omaha Kings
- Stats at NBA.com
- Stats at Basketball Reference

Sam L. Sibert, born February 11, 1949, is an American former professional basketball player. He was born in McCormick, South Carolina and went to Crane High School in Chicago. He played briefly in the NBA with the Kansas City-Omaha Kings, averaging 2.4 points per game in five games during the 1972–73 season. Sibert attended Eastern Oklahoma State College then transferred to Texas Tech University in 1969 before attending Kentucky State University. Sibert was taken in the second round of the 1972 NBA draft by the Cincinnati Royals.

== Career statistics ==
Legend
GP	Games played	GS	Games started	MPG	Minutes per game
FG%	Field goal percentage	3P%	3-point field goal percentage	FT%	Free throw percentage
RPG	Rebounds per game	APG	Assists per game	SPG	Steals per game
BPG	Blocks per game	PPG	Points per game	**Bold**	Career high

=== NBA ===
==== Regular season ====
Year	Team	GP	MPG	FG%	FT%	RPG	APG	PPG
1972–73	Kansas City–Omaha	5	5.2	.308	.800	.8	.0	2.4
