= Bob Lackey =

American basketball player (1949–2002)

Personal information
- Born: April 4, 1949 Evanston, Illinois, U.S.
- Died: June 4, 2002 (aged 53)
- Listed height: 6 ft 5 in (1.96 m)
- Listed weight: 200 lb (91 kg)

Career information
- High school: Evanston Township (Evanston, Illinois)
- College: Casper JC (1968–1970); Marquette (1970–1972)
- NBA draft: 1972: 5th round, 71st overall pick
- Drafted by: Atlanta Hawks
- Position: Shooting guard
- Number: 30

Career history
- 1972–1973: New York Nets
- Stats at Basketball Reference

Robert Lackey (April 9, 1949 – June 4, 2002) was an American professional basketball player. He was born in Evanston, Illinois. Robert Lackey was born to Raymond Oliver Lackey and died from cancer in 2002.

In high school at Evanston Township High School he led the team to the state championship in the 1967–1968 season with a 30–1 overall record.

Lackey played two seasons for the New York Nets of the American Basketball Association. Previously, he had been drafted in the fifth round of the 1972 NBA draft by the Atlanta Hawks. He played at the collegiate level for Casper College and with the then-Marquette Warriors, who have retired his uniform number.
