= Charles Edge (basketball) =

American basketball player

Personal information
- Born: February 23, 1950 (age 76) Hamtramck, Michigan, U.S.
- Listed height: 6 ft 6 in (1.98 m)
- Listed weight: 210 lb (95 kg)

Career information
- High school: Northeastern (Detroit, Michigan)
- College: LeMoyne–Owen (1969–1973)
- NBA draft: 1973: 11th round, 273rd overall pick
- Drafted by: New York Knicks
- Position: Small forward
- Number: 30, 35

Career history
- 1973–1974: Memphis Tams
- 1974–1975: Indiana Pacers
- Stats at Basketball Reference

Charles Edge (born February 23, 1950) is an American former basketball player. He played from 1973 to 1975 for the Memphis Tams and Indiana Pacers of the American Basketball Association (ABA). At 6 ft 6 in (1.98 m) and 210 lb (95 kg), he played as a small forward. He was born in 1950 in Hamtramck, Michigan. He went to Northeastern High School in Detroit. Edge went to LeMoyne-Owen College. He was drafted both by the New York Knickerbockers in the 1973 NBA draft and by the Phoenix Suns in the 1972 edition of the draft, but never played for the Knicks and the Suns.

Edge taught, coached and mentored hundreds of kids for over 20 years at Detroit St. Martin de Porres High School until its closure in 2005. Edge worked for many years at Loyola High School in Detroit. In retirement, he has stayed involved with the school's basketball program.
