= Richie Garner =

American basketball player

Personal information
- Born: Mount Vernon, New York
- Listed height: 6 ft 1 in (1.85 m)
- Listed weight: 180 lb (82 kg)

Career information
- High school: Mount Vernon (Mount Vernon, New York)
- College: Manhattan (1969–1972)
- NBA draft: 1972: 10th round, 152nd overall pick
- Drafted by: New York Knicks
- Position: Shooting guard

Career highlights
- Haggerty Award co-winner (1972); Manhattan College Hall of Fame (2004)
- Stats at Basketball Reference

Richard Garner (born in Mount Vernon, New York) is an American former basketball player who is best known for his NCAA Division I career at Manhattan College. Garner played for the Jaspers between 1969–70 and 1971–72. During his four-year career, he scored over 1,000 points, had a career shooting percentage of better than .500, and set a since-broken single season school record 121 assists in 1970–71. Garner was the first player from Manhattan College to win the Haggerty Award, an annual award presented to the best male collegiate basketball player in the greater New York City area since 1935–36. He earned it as a senior and was the co-recipient with Fordham's Tom Sullivan.

After graduating, the National Basketball Association's New York Knicks chose him as the 152nd overall pick in that year's draft. The American Basketball Association's Indiana Pacers also selected him, although he never played in either league. Garner instead served as an assistant coach at his alma mater for six years before eventually returning to Mount Vernon. He then taught and served as an administrator at Mount Vernon High School while also acting as assistant coach to the boys' basketball team. Today he serves as the pastor of the Redeemed Church of Jesus Christ in Mount Vernon.
