= Frank Russell (basketball) =

American basketball player (1949–2021)

Personal information
- Born: April 17, 1949 Jackson, Tennessee, U.S.
- Died: September 6, 2021 (aged 72) Pontiac, Michigan, U.S.
- Listed height: 6 ft 3 in (1.91 m)
- Listed weight: 180 lb (82 kg)

Career information
- High school: Pontiac Central (Pontiac, Michigan)
- College: Detroit Mercy (1969–1972)
- NBA draft: 1972: 3rd round, 35th overall pick
- Drafted by: Chicago Bulls
- Position: Shooting guard
- Number: 34

Career history
- 1972–1973: Chicago Bulls
- Stats at NBA.com
- Stats at Basketball Reference

Roosevelt Frank Russell (April 17, 1949 – September 6, 2021) was an American professional basketball player who played one season in the National Basketball Association (NBA) as a member of the Chicago Bulls during the 1972–73 season.

== Biography ==
A shooting guard, Russell attended the University of Detroit Mercy where he was drafted by the Bulls in the third round of the 1972 NBA draft by the Bulls. His two brothers, Campy and Walker Russell also played in the NBA.

After basketball, Russell attended law school at Texas Southern University before returning to Michigan where he worked in his community for the rest of his active life.

Russell died of COVID-19 pneumonia in Pontiac, Michigan, on September 6, 2021, at the age of 72.

== Career statistics ==
Legend
GP	Games played	GS	Games started	MPG	Minutes per game
FG%	Field goal percentage	3P%	3-point field goal percentage	FT%	Free throw percentage
RPG	Rebounds per game	APG	Assists per game	SPG	Steals per game
BPG	Blocks per game	PPG	Points per game	**Bold**	Career high

=== NBA ===
==== Regular season ====
Year	Team	GP	GS	MPG	FG%	FT%	RPG	APG	PPG
1972–73	Chicago	23	0	5.7	.377	.889	.7	.7	3.2
