= LaRue Martin =

American basketball player (born 1950)

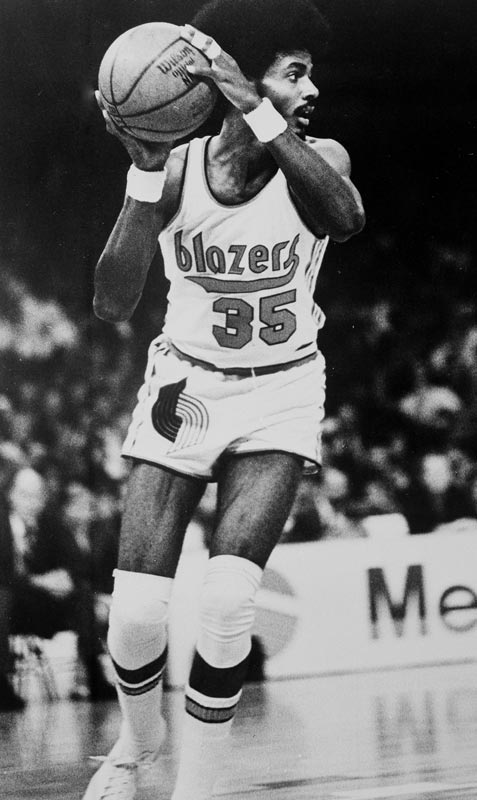
- Martin in 1972

Personal information
- Born: March 26, 1950 (age 76) Chicago, Illinois, U.S.
- Listed height: 6 ft 11 in (2.11 m)
- Listed weight: 208 lb (94 kg)

Career information
- High school: De La Salle Institute (Chicago, Illinois)
- College: Loyola Chicago (1969–1972)
- NBA draft: 1972: 1st round, 1st overall pick
- Drafted by: Portland Trail Blazers
- Playing career: 1972–1976
- Position: Center
- Number: 35

Career history
- 1972–1976: Portland Trail Blazers

Career highlights
- No. 20 retired by Loyola Ramblers

Career NBA statistics
- Points: 1,430 (5.3 ppg)
- Rebounds: 1,258 (4.6 rpg)
- Assists: 203 (0.7 apg)
- Stats at NBA.com
- Stats at Basketball Reference

LaRue Martin (born March 26, 1950) is an American former professional basketball player. Martin was drafted first overall out of Loyola University Chicago by the Portland Trail Blazers in the National Basketball Association's (NBA) controversy riddled 1972 NBA draft. He was drafted ahead of future Hall of Famers Bob McAdoo and Julius Erving. Martin has been discussed as one of the worst first overall draft picks in NBA history, but he moved on to forge a successful corporate career.

== College career ==
Shy and reserved as a youth, Martin was a 6-foot-11 center from Chicago, Illinois, who attended high school at De La Salle Institute. There he played for Coach Jerry Tokars and was a classmate of Bryant Gumbel. Martin stayed in Chicago for college, recruited to Loyola University Chicago by Coach George Ireland.

In 1969–1970, after a year on the freshman team (freshman were not allowed to play NCAA varsity basketball in this era), Martin debuted for the Loyola Ramblers, averaging a strong double-double of 16.6 points and 14.4 rebounds, as Loyola finished 13–11.

As a junior in 1970–1971, Martin was the star on a dreadful 4–20 team, averaging 18.7 points and 17.6 rebounds.

Loyola finished 8–14 in Martin's senior season of 1971–1972, despite his averaging 19.6 points and 15.7 rebounds.

Martin had garnered attention, playing well against Bill Walton in a game between Loyola and UCLA, in 1971–72. Although his Ramblers lost to UCLA 92–64 on January 28, 1972, while the Bruins were in the midst of their 88-game winning streak, Martin had 19 points and 18 rebounds while matched up directly against future teammate Walton, who had 18 points and 16 rebounds. Martin had played similarly against Jim Chones of Marquette in their game the night before, outscoring him, 33–22, and outrebounding him 23–14.

Portland Trail Blazers scout Stu Inman was in attendance for both games and took notice of Martin's strong back-to-back performances against the two premier big men in the country. Portland would later draft both Walton and Martin.

In his career at Loyola, Martin averaged a double-double of 18.2 points and 15.9 rebounds in 67 games. He had 1222 career points with 1062 rebounds. Martin remains Loyola's all-time leading rebounder.

== Professional career ==
=== Portland Trail Blazers (1972–1976) ===
==== 1972–74: Early years ====
The Portland Trail Blazers made Martin the first overall pick in the 1972 NBA draft; Martin was also the #3 pick of the American Basketball Association draft by the Dallas Chaparrals.

The 1972 NBA draft may have been controversially influenced: Chones had signed with the New York Nets of the ABA.

It was rumored that North Carolina star Bob McAdoo, one of the best players available in the draft, had signed with the Virginia Squires of the rival American Basketball Association after a "secret" ABA draft took place, in which names of those drafted were not made public; Reportedly, NBA Commissioner Walter Kennedy had advised NBA teams not to draft McAdoo. Other reports were that a contract was signed and voided, because McAdoo was too young to have signed it, and that the NBA Buffalo Braves somehow knew this. Yet another story was that Portland negotiated with McAdoo on the eve of the draft, but could not meet his demands. Later, McAdoo was the No. 1 pick of the 1972 American Basketball Association Draft.

Buffalo chose McAdoo with the pick behind Martin, while the Milwaukee Bucks drafted Julius Erving with the No. 12 pick, but he was already playing in the ABA, and remained with the Virginia Squires.

As a rookie in the 1972–73 season (Portland's third overall season as a franchise), Martin was 6'11" and weighed 205 pounds. In his rookie year, he averaged 4.4 points and 4.6 rebounds in 77 games with limited minutes (12 per game). The Trail Blazers finished 21–61 under head coach Jack McCloskey. When the Trail Blazers played at Chicago during his rookie year, McCloskey benched Martin for the entire game. "It was a tough pill to swallow. I was embarrassed. I had tears in my eyes." said Martin, who had numerous family and friends in attendance. "Every time I think about it it haunts me." Martin had similar numbers the next season playing for McCloskey and the Trail Blazers were 27–55.

Martin reflected on coach McCloskey by stating that he "wasn't a believer in my ability," Martin said. "He came from Wake Forest in North Carolina, and he wanted Bob McAdoo. Hey, Bob was a hell of a player. I know that. Maybe I wasn't the right guy for Jack. So be it. But I never gave him any grief when I was playing for him. I'm not into that. I just kept my mouth shut and did what I was told. I guess it wasn't good enough."

==== 1974–76: Final seasons ====
In 1974–75, under new head coach Lenny Wilkens, Martin initially saw his playing time decrease more after the Trail Blazers had selected Bill Walton as the No. 1 pick of the 1974 NBA draft and inserted him in the lineup. However, Martin averaged 7.0 points in 17 minutes and shot .452 from the field, when Walton missed most of the year with injuries. Portland finished 38-44 that year, then finished the next year 37–45.

Martin was traded from the Trail Blazers to the Seattle SuperSonics before the 1976 season. However, Martin wouldn't play another game after being cut by Seattle before the start of the 1976–77 season. Martin signed contracts with the Cleveland Cavaliers (September 1, 1977) and Chicago Bulls (August 1, 1978). In both cases he was placed on waivers within weeks of signing. Martin also rejected numerous offers to play in Europe.

In four NBA seasons, Martin averaged 5.3 points and 4.6 rebounds in 271 career games, averaging 14 minutes per game.

Martin's short career at times becomes the punchline to draft jokes. His selection was the predecessor in Portland to other unfulfilled big-man potential in Bill Walton (No. 1 overall pick 1974 NBA draft), Sam Bowie (No. 2 overall pick in 1984 NBA draft selected just ahead of Michael Jordan) and Greg Oden (No. 1 overall pick of the 2007 NBA draft selected just ahead of Kevin Durant).

“Being a No. 1 draft choice, getting that big zero on your back, you are a marked man,” Martin said at a National Basketball Retired Players Association event. “My career was up and down. They called me the worst draft choice in the nation, and that bothered me. But I had the opportunity to move on and get into the corporate world, and I’ve moved on ever since.”

His selection as the #1 pick had been compared to other #1 picks that were later seen as busts in the NBA, such as Michael Olowokandi from 1998, Kwame Brown from 2001, and most recently Anthony Bennett from 2013. However, his selection is oftentimes considered forgotten about in the more modern-day era by comparison to those other players.

== Career statistics ==
=== NBA ===
Year	Team	GP	GS	MPG	FG%	3P%	FT%	RPG	APG	SPG	BPG	PPG
1972–73	Portland	77	–	12.9	.396	–	.649	4.6	.5	–	–	4.4
1973–74	Portland	50	–	10.8	.435	–	.636	3.6	.4	.1	.5	4.9
1974–75	Portland	81	–	16.9	.452	–	.697	5.0	.9	.4	.6	7.0
1975–76	Portland	63	–	14.1	.361	–	.740	4.9	1.1	.1	.4	4.4
Career		271	–	14.0	.416	–	.685	4.6	.7	.2	.5	5.3

== Personal life ==
Martin received a B.A. in sociology with a minor in education from Loyola. After his basketball career, he worked for Nike in Oregon, and an insurance company before joining UPS in the mid-1980s. Remaining at UPS, he has worked as the Community Services Manager since August 2005.

Martin is on the National Basketball Retired Players Association Board of Directors.

Active in the community, besides his corporate career, Martins's board memberships and civic affiliations have included the City Club of Chicago, YMCA Mentoring Program, the African American Advisory Council of the Cook County State's Attorney's office, the Urban League of N.W. Indiana, M.L.K. Boys and Girls Club of Chicago, The Leverage Network and De La Salle Instite Board of Directors.

Martin was featured in a segment on HBO's Real Sports with Bryant Gumbel in 2011.

Reflecting on his NBA career, Martin said "I don't believe in saying anything negative, you have no control over that, I took care of my family, did what I had to do and I'm the type of person I can't dwell off the negatives. I can't. I kept my head up high and moved onto a positive mode of life and it has treated me very well."

== Honors ==
- In 1982, Martin was inducted into the Illinois Basketball Coaches Hall of Fame at the Basketball Museum of Illinois.
- Martin's #20 jersey was retired by Loyola in 2002.
- Martin is in the De La Salle Instite Sports Hall of Fame.
- Martin is in the Loyola Athletics Hall of Fame.
- In 2018, Martin was named to the All-Century Team at Loyola.
- Martin has been honored with numerous community service awards. Among them are the Leadership in Community Relations Award from the Human Resources Development Institute, Chicago Urban League Beautiful People Award, Dr. Martin Luther King Jr. Legacy Award, and the Black Heritage Award.
