= Long Beach State Beach men's basketball =

Men's college basketball team

2026-27 Long Beach State Beach men's basketball team
- University: California State University, Long Beach
- Head coach: Chris Acker (3rd season)
- Location: Long Beach, California
- Arena: LBS Financial Credit Union Pyramid (capacity: 4,200)
- Conference: Big West
- Nickname: Beach
- Colors: Black and gold

NCAA Division I tournament Elite Eight
- 1971, 1972
Other NCAA Division I tournament results
Sweet Sixteen	1961†, 1970, 1971, 1972, 1973
Appearances	1970, 1971, 1972, 1973, 1977, 1993, 1995, 2007, 2012, 2024 † at Division II level

Conference tournament champions
- 1970, 1971, 1972, 1973, 1977, 1993, 1995, 2007, 2012, 2024

Conference regular-season champions
- 1970, 1971, 1972, 1973, 1974, 1975, 1976, 1977, 1996, 2007, 2011, 2012, 2013, 2022

Uniforms
Home	Away	Alternate
- † at Division II level

The Long Beach State Beach men's basketball team represents California State University, Long Beach, in Long Beach, California. The school's team competes in the Big West Conference. Because they won the 2024 Big West Conference men's basketball tournament, the team received an automatic bid to the 2024 NCAA Division I men's basketball tournament; the last time Long Beach State competed in this tournament was 2012. The Beach is currently coached by Chris Acker. Long Beach State officially changed their nickname with the NCAA to "Beach" from "49ers" prior to the 2019–20 season.

In the 2006–07 season, the 49ers finished with a 24–8 (12–2) record, the Big West conference championship, and the school's first trip to the NCAA tournament in 12 years. Star guard Aaron Nixon was named Big West player of the year, as well as being selected as an AP Honorable Mention All-American.

In January, 1974, Long Beach State was placed on indefinite probation for not less than three years by the NCAA because of basketball and football violations. The NCAA cited the programs for 26 violations of constitution and by-laws, saying they were among the most serious it had ever considered. The 49ers basketball team ranked ninth in the country at the time.

In 2008, the 49ers began a three-year probation term, vacated 18 victories from their 2005–2006 season, and reduced scholarships and recruiting in order to keep eligibility for postseason play.

== Postseason results ==
=== NCAA Division I ===
Long Beach State has appeared in ten,NCAA tournaments. Their combined record is 7–11. Three of the appearances were later being vacated by the NCAA

Year	Seed	Round	Opponent	Result
1970		First Round; Sweet Sixteen; Regional third place Game	Weber State; UCLA; Santa Clara	W 93–73; L 65–88; L 86–89
1971*		First Round; Sweet Sixteen; Elite Eight	Weber State; Pacific; UCLA	W 77–68; W 78–65; L 55–57
1972*		First Round; Sweet Sixteen; Elite Eight	BYU; San Francisco; UCLA	W 95–90^{OT} W 75–55; L 57–73
1973*		First Round; Sweet Sixteen; Regional third place Game	Weber State; San Francisco; Arizona State	W 88–75; L 67–77; W 84–80
1977		First Round	Idaho State	L 72–83
1993	11	First Round	(6) Illinois	L 72–75
1995	13	First Round	(4) Utah	L 64–76
2007	12	First Round	(5) Tennessee	L 86–121
2012	12	First Round	(5) New Mexico	L 68–75
2024	15	First Round	(2) Arizona	L 65–85

=== NCAA Division II ===
The 49ers appeared in one NCAA Division II men's basketball tournament. Their combined record was 1–1.

Year	Round	Opponent	Result
1961	Regional Semifinals; Sweet Sixteen	Chapman; UC Santa Barbara	W 70–66; L 54–58

=== NIT results ===
Long Beach State has appeared in nine National Invitation Tournaments (NIT). Their combined record is 2–9.

Year	Round	Opponent	Result
1980	First Round; Second Round	Pepperdine; UNLV	W 104–87; L 81–90
1988	First Round	Stanford	L 77–80
1990	First Round; Second Round	Arizona State; Hawaiʻi	W 86–71; L 79–84
1992	First Round	TCU	L 61–73
2000	First Round	California	L 66–70
2011	First Round	Washington State	L 74–85
2013	First Round	Baylor	L 66–112
2016	First Round	Washington	L 102–107
2022	First Round	BYU	L 72–93

== Beach in the NBA ==
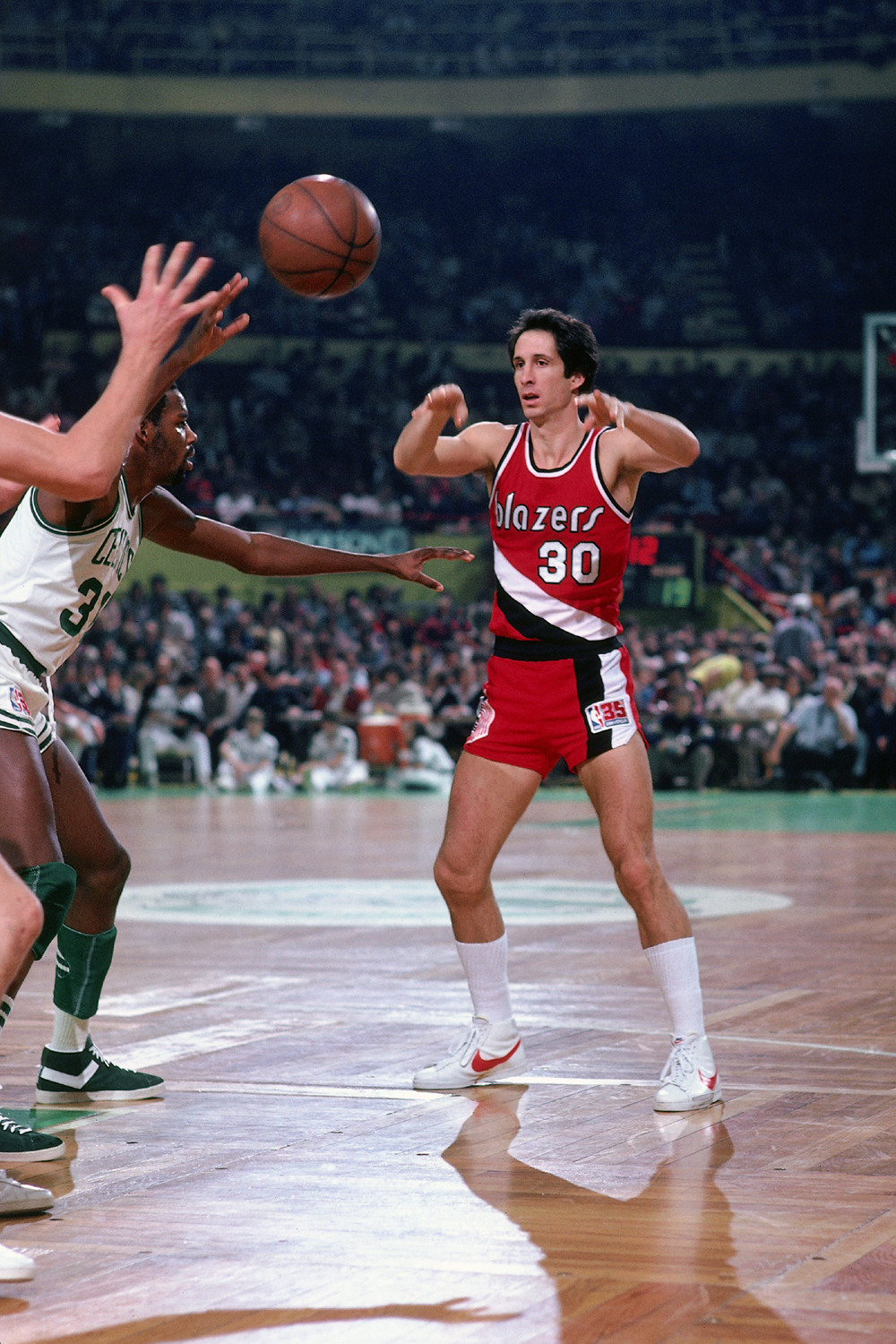
Bob Gross, of Long Beach State, whose number was retired by the Portland Trail Blazers

The following former Long Beach State players have played professionally for the National Basketball Association:

Position	Name	Height	Weight (lbs.)	Hometown	Draft year	Pick	Draft Team	Most Recent Team	Years active
G	James Cotton	6'5"		Bellflower, California	1997	32nd	Seattle SuperSonics	Chicago Bulls	1997–1999
F	Craig Dykema	6'8"	190	Lakewood, California	1981	66th	Phoenix Suns	Phoenix Suns	1981–1982
SF	James Ennis III	6'6"	215	Ventura, California	2013	50th	Atlanta Hawks	Denver Nuggets	2015–2022
F	Leonard Gray	6'8"	240	Kansas City, Kansas	1974	26th	Seattle SuperSonics	Washington Bullets	1974–1977
F	Bob Gross	6'6"	200	San Pedro, California	1975	25th	Portland Trail Blazers	San Diego Clippers	1975–1983
G	Lucious Harris	6'5"	190	Los Angeles	1993	28th	Dallas Mavericks	Cleveland Cavaliers	1993–2007
F	Juaquin Hawkins	6'7"	205	Lynwood, California	1996	UD	Los Angeles Lakers	Houston Rockets	1996–2003
G	Craig Hodges	6'2"	190	Park Forest, Illinois	1982	48th	San Diego Clippers	Chicago Bulls	1982–1992
G/F	Glenn McDonald	6'6"	190	Los Angeles	1974	17th	Boston Celtics	Milwaukee Bucks	1974–1977
F	Eric McWilliams	6'8"	200	Denver	1972	37th	Houston Rockets	Houston Rockets	1972–1973
F/C	Cliff Pondexter	6'9"	233	Fresno, California	1974	16th	Chicago Bulls	Chicago Bulls	1974–1978
G/F	Ed Ratleff	6'6"	195	Columbus, Ohio	1973	6th	Houston Rockets	Houston Rockets	1973–1978
F	Sam Robinson	6'7"	190	Los Angeles	1970	91st	Seattle SuperSonics	Seattle SuperSonics	1970–1972
F	Bryon Russell	6'7"	225	San Bernardino, California	1993	45th	Utah Jazz	Denver Nuggets	1993–2006
F	Chuck Terry	6'6"	215	Long Beach, California	1972	29th	Milwaukee Bucks	New York Nets	1972–1977
F/C	George Trapp	6'8"	205	Highland Park, Michigan	1971	5th	Atlanta Hawks	Detroit Pistons	1971–1976
G	Casper Ware	5'10"	175	Cerritos, California	2012	UD	Philadelphia 76ers	Philadelphia 76ers	2014
F	Michael Wiley	6'9"	200	Long Beach, California	1980	39th	San Antonio Spurs	San Diego Clippers	1980–1982
G	Morlon Wiley	6'4"	185	Long Beach, California	1988	46th	Dallas Mavericks	Atlanta Hawks	1988–1995
G	Rickey Williams	6'1"	175	Buffalo, New York	1978	190th	New Orleans Jazz	Utah Jazz	1982–1983

== Retired numbers ==
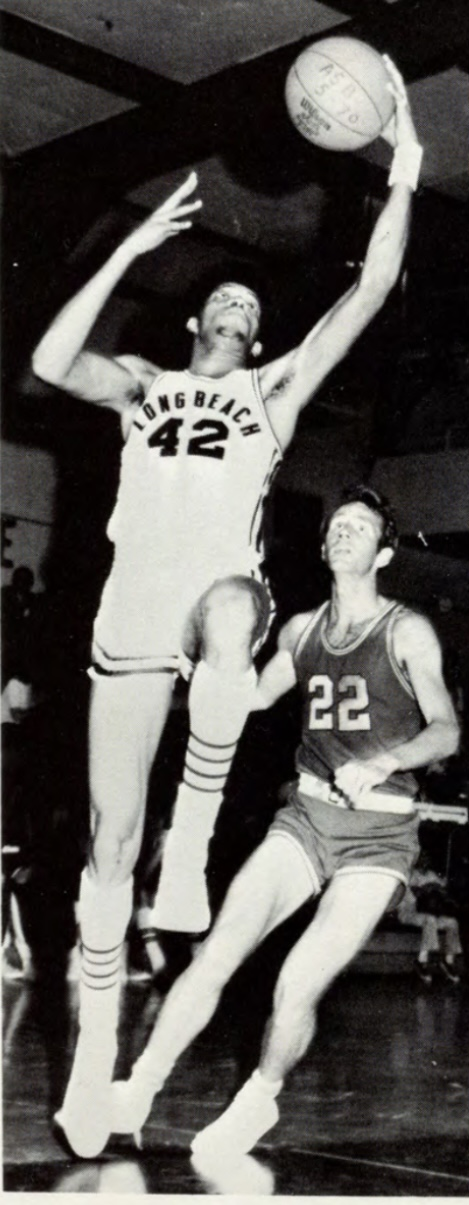
Ratleff was twice a consensus first-team All-American.

Four numbers have been retired in Long Beach State basketball history:

Long Beach State Beach retired numbers
No.	Player	Position	Career	No. ret.	Ref.
20	Glenn McDonald	SF	1971–1974	2018	
30	Lucious Harris	SG	1989–1993	2007	
32	Bryon Russell	SF	1990–1993	2010	
42	Ed Ratleff	SG/SF	1970–1973	1991	
