= Eric McWilliams =

American basketball player

Personal information
- Born: April 18, 1950 (age 76) Denver, Colorado, U.S.
- Listed height: 6 ft 8 in (2.03 m)
- Listed weight: 200 lb (91 kg)

Career information
- High school: John Muir (Pasadena, California)
- College: Pasadena CC (1968–1970); Long Beach State (1970–1972)
- NBA draft: 1972: 3rd round, 37th overall pick
- Drafted by: Houston Rockets
- Position: Small forward
- Number: 22

Career history
- 1972–1973: Houston Rockets
- 1975–1976: Alviks BK

Career highlights
- Second-team All-PCAA (1972)
- Stats at NBA.com
- Stats at Basketball Reference

Eric Lee McWilliams (born April 18, 1950) is a retired American professional basketball player born in Denver, Colorado.

He played college basketball at California State University, Long Beach (now Long Beach State Beach) and was a second-team All-Pacific Coast Athletic Association selection in 1972. McWilliams played one season (1972–73) in the National Basketball Association as a member of the Houston Rockets. He averaged 2.0 points per game in 44 games. He played for the Stockholm, Sweden based Alviks BK during the 1975–76 season.

== Career statistics ==
Legend
GP	Games played	GS	Games started	MPG	Minutes per game
FG%	Field goal percentage	3P%	3-point field goal percentage	FT%	Free throw percentage
RPG	Rebounds per game	APG	Assists per game	SPG	Steals per game
BPG	Blocks per game	PPG	Points per game	**Bold**	Career high

=== NBA ===
==== Regular season ====
Year	Team	GP	MPG	FG%	FT%	RPG	APG	PPG
1972–73	Houston	44	5.6	.347	.486	1.4	.1	2.0
