= Dwaine Dillard =

American basketball player

Personal information
- Born: March 9, 1949 Omaha, Nebraska, U.S.
- Died: June 25, 2008 (aged 59)
- Listed height: 6 ft 6 in (1.98 m)
- Listed weight: 230 lb (104 kg)

Career information
- High school: Omaha Central (Omaha, Nebraska)
- College: Eastern Michigan (1968–1969)
- NBA draft: 1972: 6th round, 89th overall pick
- Drafted by: Baltimore Bullets
- Position: Small forward
- Number: 33

Career history
- 1975: Utah Stars
- Stats at Basketball Reference

Dwaine R. Dillard (March 9, 1949 – June 25, 2008) was an American professional basketball player who spent one season in the American Basketball Association (ABA) with the Utah Stars during the 1975–76 season, that team's final season of existence. He attended Eastern Michigan University before being drafted in the sixth round (89^{th} overall) during the 1972 NBA draft by the Baltimore Bullets and in the fourth round during the 1972 ABA draft by the New York Nets, both of whom he never played with.
