= Ansley Truitt =

American basketball player (1950–2021)

Personal information
- Born: August 24, 1950 West Point, Georgia, U.S.
- Died: February 13, 2021 (aged 70) Las Vegas, Nevada, U.S.
- Listed height: 6 ft 9 in (2.06 m)
- Listed weight: 215 lb (98 kg)

Career information
- High school: Wilson (San Francisco, California)
- College: California (1969–1972)
- NBA draft: 1972: 3rd round, 41st overall pick
- Drafted by: New York Knicks
- Position: Power forward
- Number: 40

Career history
- 1972–1973: Dallas Chaparrals
- 1978: Crispa Redmanizers

Career highlights
- First-team All-Pac-8 (1972); Second-team All-Pac-8 (1971); Third-team Parade All-American (1968)
- Stats at Basketball Reference

Ansley Hoover Truitt Jr. (August 24, 1950 – February 13, 2021) was an American professional basketball player for the Dallas Chaparrals in the American Basketball Association (ABA).

== Life and career ==
He played one season with the Chaparrals from 1972 through 1973. Truitt played college basketball for the California Golden Bears, where he was a first-team all-conference selection in the Pac-8 (known now as the Pac-12) in 1972. He was drafted in the 1972 NBA draft in the third round with the 41st overall pick by the New York Knicks.

Truitt died from COVID-19 on February 13, 2021, at the age of 70. He is survived by his wife, Mary and three daughters, Najah, Nikita and Alanna.
