= Wil Robinson =

American basketball player

Personal information
- Born: December 25, 1949 (age 76) Uniontown, Pennsylvania, U.S.
- Listed height: 6 ft 2 in (1.88 m)
- Listed weight: 175 lb (79 kg)

Career information
- High school: Laurel Highlands (North Union Township, Pennsylvania)
- College: West Virginia (1969–1972)
- NBA draft: 1972: 4th round, 54th overall pick
- Drafted by: Houston Rockets
- Position: Shooting guard
- Number: 10

Career history
- 1973–1974: Memphis Tams

Career highlights
- Third-team All-American – AP (1972)
- Stats at Basketball Reference

Wilbert Robinson Jr. (born December 25, 1949) is an American former American Basketball Association (ABA) player. In his senior year at West Virginia University, Robinson was selected to the AP All-American Third Team. Robinson was taken with the seventh pick in the fourth round of the 1972 NBA draft, however he never played in the NBA. Robinson played one season in the ABA for the Memphis Tams, averaging 8.6 points, 2.9 assists, and 1.8 rebounds per game.
