= 1972 NBA draft =

Basketball player selection

General information
- Sport: Basketball
- Dates: April 10, 1972 (first 10 rounds); April 15, 1972 (remaining rounds)
- Location: New York City, New York

Overview
- 198 total selections in 18 rounds
- League: NBA
- First selection: LaRue Martin, Portland Trail Blazers
- Hall of Famers: 3: F Bob McAdoo; G Paul Westphal; G Julius Erving

The 1972 NBA draft was the 26th annual draft of the National Basketball Association (NBA). The draft was held on April 10 and 15, 1972, before the 1972–73 season. In this draft, 17 NBA teams took turns selecting amateur U.S. college basketball players and other eligible players, including international players. The first two picks in the draft belonged to the teams that finished last in each conference, with the order determined by a coin flip. The Portland Trail Blazers won the coin flip and were awarded the first overall pick, while the Buffalo Braves were awarded the second pick. The remaining first-round picks and the subsequent rounds were assigned to teams in reverse order of their win–loss record in the previous season. As a result of last year's supplemental hardship draft, the Cincinnati Royals, the Atlanta Hawks, the Golden State Warriors and the Baltimore Bullets forfeited their first-round picks, while the Los Angeles Lakers forfeited their fourth round pick. Prior to the start of the season, the Cincinnati Royals relocated and became the Kansas City-Omaha Kings. The draft consisted of 18 rounds comprising the selection of 198 players.

== Draft selections and draftee career notes ==
A player who had finished his four-year college eligibility was eligible for selection. If a player left college early, he would not be eligible for selection until his college class graduated. Before the draft, eight college underclassmen were declared eligible for selection under the "hardship" rule, a similar case in which Spencer Haywood successfully argued in his court case against the NBA which allowed him to play in the NBA before his college class graduated. These players had applied and gave evidence of financial hardship to the league, which granted them the right to start earning their living by starting their professional careers earlier. This was the first draft where college underclassmen were allowed to enter.

LaRue Martin from Loyola University Chicago was selected first overall by the Portland Trail Blazers. Bob McAdoo, a college junior from the University of North Carolina, was selected second by the Buffalo Braves, and went on to win the Rookie of the Year Award in his first season. McAdoo, 10th pick Paul Westphal, and 12th pick Julius Erving have been inducted to the Basketball Hall of Fame, and Erving was also named to the list of the 50 Greatest Players in NBA History announced at the league's 50th anniversary in 1996. McAdoo was a 3-time NBA Scoring champion, and NBA championship with the Los Angeles Lakers in 1982 and 1985. He won the Most Valuable Player Award in 1975, had two All-NBA Team selections, and was a five-time All-Star. Erving had left college in 1971 to play professionally in the American Basketball Association (ABA) with the Virginia Squires. He joined the NBA in 1976 after both leagues merged, playing 11 seasons with the Philadelphia 76ers. An NBA champion in 1983, he was MVP in 1981, won three ABA Most Valuable Player Awards, was All-ABA five times and All-NBA seven, and an ABA All-Star five times and NBA All-Star eleven.

Paul Westphal, the 10th pick, was named All-NBA four times, an All-Star five, and on the 1974 NBA championship Boston Celtics. After retiring as a player, he went on to coach three NBA teams, most recently the Sacramento Kings. The 16th pick, Jim Price, and 34th pick, Don Buse, were also selected to an All-Star Game. Chris Ford, the 17th pick, won the NBA championship in 1981 with the Celtics. After retiring as a player, he went on to coach four NBA teams, including the Celtics. Ralph Simpson, the 11th pick, had left college in 1970 to play professionally in the ABA with Denver Rockets. He was selected to five ABA All-Star Games and four All-ABA Teams before he joined the NBA in 1976.

LaRue Martin is considered one of the biggest draft busts in NBA history. Martin only lasted four seasons in the league with a career scoring average of 5.3. Martin and eight other first-round picks all had insignificant contributions to the league; none of them had career scoring averages above 9 points per game and only one of them lasted more than six seasons in the NBA. Two of the first-round picks, Erving and Simpson, had already played in the ABA before the draft. They stayed there until both leagues merged in 1976 and only Simpson played for the team that he got drafted to.

In the tenth round, the Portland Trail Blazers selected Krešimir Ćosić from Brigham Young University with the 144th pick. However, he opted to play another season in college before returning to Yugoslavia in 1973. Ćosić, who was also selected in the fifth round of the 1973 draft, had a successful career in Europe, winning numerous league and club titles, as well as six gold medals with the Yugoslavian national team. For his achievements, he has been inducted to the Basketball Hall of Fame. He has also been inducted by the International Basketball Federation (FIBA) to the FIBA Hall of Fame.

== Key ==
Pos.	G	F	C
Position	Guard	Forward	Center

^	Denotes player who has been inducted to the Naismith Memorial Basketball Hall of Fame
*	Denotes player who has been selected for at least one All-Star Game and All-NBA Team
^{+}	Denotes player who has been selected for at least one All-Star Game
^{#}	Denotes player who has never appeared in an NBA regular-season or playoff game
^{~}	Denotes player who has been selected as Rookie of the Year

== Draft ==
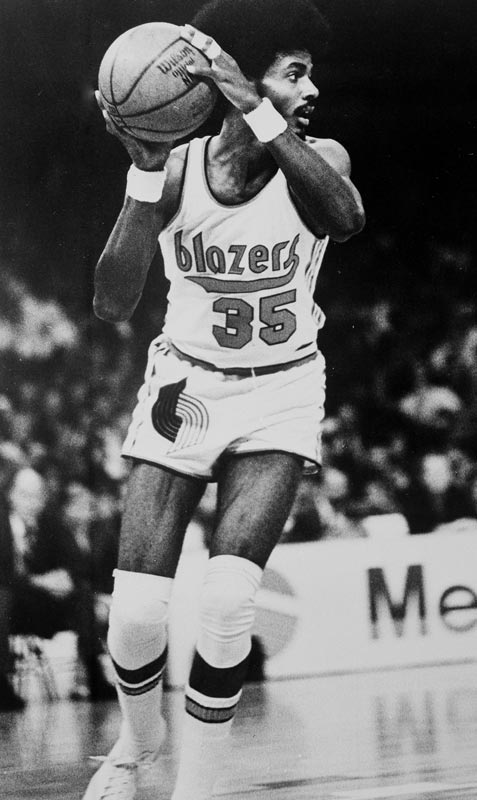
LaRue Martin was the first overall pick by the Portland Trail Blazers.

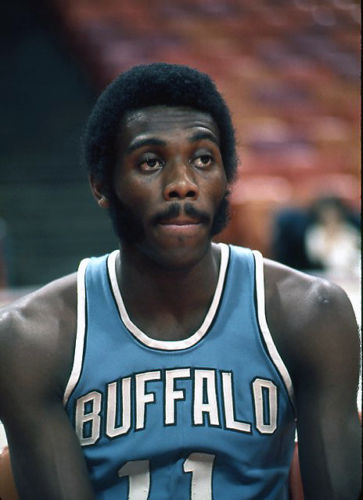
Bob McAdoo was selected 2nd overall by the Buffalo Braves.

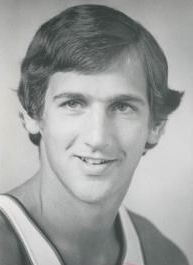
Paul Westphal was selected 10th overall by the Boston Celtics.

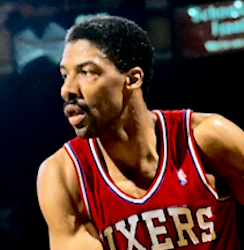
Julius Erving was selected 12th overall by the Milwaukee Bucks.

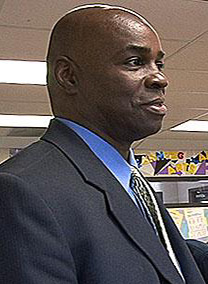
Brian Taylor was selected 23rd overall by the Seattle SuperSonics.

Rnd.	Pick	Player	Pos.	Nationality (Note: Nationality indicates the player's national team or representative nationality. If a player has not competed at the international level, then the nationality indicates the national team which the player is eligible to represent according to FIBA rules.)	Team	School / club team
1	1	LaRue Martin	C	United States	Portland Trail Blazers	Loyola (Illinois) (Sr.)
1	2	Bob McAdoo^^{~}	F/C	United States	Buffalo Braves	North Carolina (Jr.)
1	3	Dwight Davis	F	United States	Cleveland Cavaliers	Houston (Sr.)
1	4	Corky Calhoun	F	United States	Phoenix Suns (from Detroit via Houston)^{[a]}	Penn (Sr.)
1	5	Fred Boyd	G	United States	Philadelphia 76ers	Oregon State (Sr.)
1	Cincinnati Royals (forfeited due to participation in the 1971 hardship draft)					
1	6	Russ Lee	G/F	United States	Milwaukee Bucks (from Houston)^{[b]}	Marshall (Sr.)
1	Atlanta Hawks (forfeited due to participation in the 1971 hardship draft)					
1	Baltimore Bullets (forfeited due to participation in the 1971 hardship draft)					
1	7	Isaac Stallworth	G/F	United States	Seattle SuperSonics	Kansas (Sr.)
1	8	Tom Riker	F/C	United States	New York Knicks	South Carolina (Sr.)
1	9	Bob Nash	F	United States	Detroit Pistons (from Phoenix)^{[c]}	Hawaii (Sr.)
1	Golden State Warriors (forfeited due to participation in the 1971 hardship draft)					
1	10	Paul Westphal^	G	United States	Boston Celtics	USC (Sr.)
1	11	Ralph Simpson	G/F	United States	Chicago Bulls	Denver Rockets (ABA)
1	12	Julius Erving^	G/F	United States	Milwaukee Bucks	Virginia Squires (ABA)
1	13	Travis Grant	F	United States	Los Angeles Lakers	Kentucky State (Sr.)
2	14	Bob Davis	F	United States	Portland Trail Blazers	Weber State (Sr.)
2	15	Harold Fox	G	United States	Buffalo Braves	Jacksonville (Sr.)
2	16	Jim Price^{+}	G	United States	Los Angeles Lakers (from Cleveland)^{[d]}	Louisville (Sr.)
2	17	Chris Ford	G/F	United States	Detroit Pistons	Villanova (Sr.)
2	18	Joby Wright	F/C	United States	Seattle SuperSonics (from Philadelphia)^{[e]}	Indiana (Sr.)
2	19	Sam Sibert	F	United States	Cincinnati Royals	Kentucky State (Sr.)
2	20	John Gianelli	F/C	United States	Houston Rockets	Pacific (Sr.)
2	21	Steve Bracey	G	United States	Atlanta Hawks	Tulsa (Sr.)
2	22	Paul Stovall	F	United States	Los Angeles Lakers (from Baltimore)^{[f]}	Arizona State (Sr.)
2	23	Brian Taylor	G	United States	Seattle SuperSonics	Princeton (Jr.)
2	24	Steve Hawes	F/C	United States	Cleveland Cavaliers (from New York)^{[g]}	Washington (Sr.)
2	25	Tom Patterson	F	United States	Baltimore Bullets (from Phoenix)^{[h]}	Ouachita Baptist (Sr.)
2	26	Dave Twardzik	G	United States	Portland Trail Blazers (from Golden State)^{[i]}	Old Dominion (Sr.)
2	27	Dennis Wuycik^{#}	F	United States	Boston Celtics	North Carolina (Sr.)
2	28	Mike Ratliff	C	United States	Cincinnati Royals (from Chicago)^{[j]}	Eau Claire State (Sr.)
2	29	Chuck Terry	F	United States	Milwaukee Bucks	Long Beach State (Sr.)
2	30	Ollie Johnson	F	United States	Portland Trail Blazers (from Los Angeles)^{[k]}	Temple (Sr.)
3	31	Lloyd Neal	F/C	United States	Portland Trail Blazers	Tennessee State (Sr.)
3	32	Bob Morse^{#}	F	United States	Buffalo Braves	Penn (Sr.)
3	33	Scott English	F	United States	Phoenix Suns (from Cleveland)^{[l]}	Texas-El Paso (Sr.)
3	34	Don Buse^{+}	G	United States	Phoenix Suns (from Detroit)	Evansville (Sr.)
3	35	Frank Russell	G	United States	Chicago Bulls (from Cincinnati)^{[j]}	Detroit (Sr.)
3	36	Charlie Tharpe^{#}	C	United States	Philadelphia 76ers	Belhaven (Sr.)
3	37	Eric McWilliams	F	United States	Houston Rockets	Long Beach State (Sr.)
3	38	Ron Riley	F	United States	Cincinnati Royals (from Atlanta)^{[m]}	Southern California (Sr.)
3	39	Kevin Porter	G	United States	Baltimore Bullets	Saint Francis (PA) (Sr.)
3	40	Jim Creighton	F	United States	Seattle SuperSonics	Colorado (Sr.)
3	41	Ansley Truitt^{#}	F	United States	New York Knicks	California (Sr.)
3	42	Claude Terry	G/F	United States	Phoenix Suns	Stanford (Sr.)
3	43	Bill Chamberlain	F	United States	Golden State Warriors	North Carolina (Sr.)
3	44	Wayne Grabiec^{#}	G	United States	Boston Celtics	Michigan (Sr.)
3	45	Chuck Jura^{#}	C	United States	Chicago Bulls	Nebraska (Sr.)
3	46	George Adams^{#}	F	United States	Milwaukee Bucks	Gardner–Webb (Sr.)
3	47	Gregg Northington^{#}	C	United States	New York Knicks	Alabama State (Sr.)
4	48	Gary Stewart^{#}	F	United States	Portland Trail Blazers	Canisius (Sr.)
4	49	George Bryant^{#}	G	United States	Buffalo Braves	Eastern Kentucky (Sr.)
4	50	Hank Siemiontkowski^{#}	F	United States	Cleveland Cavaliers	Villanova (Sr.)
4	51	Ernie Fleming^{#}	F	United States	Detroit Pistons	Jacksonville (Sr.)
4	52	Marshall Wingate^{#}	G	United States	Philadelphia 76ers	Niagara (Sr.)
4	53	Frank Schade	G	United States	Cincinnati Royals	Eau Claire State (Sr.)
4	54	Wil Robinson^{#}	G	United States	Houston Rockets	West Virginia (Sr.)
4	55	Reggie Bird^{#}	G	United States	Atlanta Hawks	Princeton (Sr.)
4	56	Al Sanders^{#}	F	United States	Baltimore Bullets	LSU (Sr.)
4	57	Joe Mackey^{#}	F	United States	Seattle SuperSonics	USC (Sr.)
4	58	Henry Bibby	G	United States	New York Knicks	UCLA (Sr.)
4	59	Matt Gantt^{#}	F	United States	Phoenix Suns	St. Bonaventure (Sr.)
4	60	John Tschogl	F	United States	Golden State Warriors	UC Santa Barbara (Sr.)
4	61	Nate Stephens^{#}	C	United States	Boston Celtics	Long Beach State (Jr.)
4	62	Ted Martiniuk^{#}	G	United States	Chicago Bulls	Saint Peter's (Sr.)
4	63	Art White^{#}	F	United States	Milwaukee Bucks	Georgetown (Sr.)
4	Los Angeles Lakers (forfeited due to participation in the 1971 hardship draft)					
5	64	Michael Reid^{#}	G	United States	Portland Trail Blazers	UC Riverside (So.)
5	65	Arnie Berman^{#}	F	United States	Buffalo Braves	Brown (Sr.)
5	66	Sam Cash^{#}	F	United States	Cleveland Cavaliers	UC Riverside (Sr.)
5	67	Ernest Pettis^{#}	G	United States	Detroit Pistons	Western Michigan (Sr.)
5	68	Dave Bustion^{#}	F	United States	Kansas City–Omaha Kings	Denver (Sr.)
5	69	Joe Bynes^{#}	F	United States	Philadelphia 76ers	Arkansas–Pine Bluff (Sr.)
5	70	James Silas	G	United States	Houston Rockets	Stephen F. Austin (Sr.)
5	71	Bob Lackey^{#}	G	United States	Atlanta Hawks	Marquette (Sr.)
5	72	Walter Jones^{#}	F	United States	Baltimore Bullets	LIU (Sr.)
5	73	Gary Ladd^{#}	G	United States	Seattle SuperSonics	Seattle (Sr.)
5	74	Bob Ford^{#}	F	United States	New York Knicks	Purdue (Sr.)
5	75	Wardell Dyson^{#}	F	United States	Phoenix Suns	Shaw College (Sr.)
5	76	Charles Dudley	G	United States	Golden State Warriors	Washington (Sr.)
5	77	Bryan Adrian^{#}	G	United States	Boston Celtics	Davidson (Sr.)
5	78	Rowland Garrett	F	United States	Chicago Bulls	Florida State (Sr.)
5	79	Ron Harris^{#}	F	United States	Milwaukee Bucks	Wichita State (Sr.)
5	80	Glen Summors^{#}	F	United States	Los Angeles Lakers	Gannon (Sr.)
6	81	Joe Gaines^{#}	F	United States	Portland Trail Blazers	Belmont (Sr.)
6	82	Ed Czernota^{#}	F	United States	Buffalo Braves	Sacred Heart (Sr.)
6	83	Tom Parker^{#}	F	United States	Cleveland Cavaliers	Kentucky (Sr.)
6	84	Terry Benton^{#}	F	United States	Detroit Pistons	Wichita State (Sr.)
6	85	John Glover^{#}	F	United States	Philadelphia 76ers	Wiley (Sr.)
6	86	Jerry Crocker^{#}	G	United States	Kansas City–Omaha Kings	Guilford (Sr.)
6	87	Mike Collins^{#}	F	United States	Houston Rockets	Seattle (Sr.)
6	88	Randy Noll^{#}	F	United States	Atlanta Hawks	Marshall (Jr.)
6	89	Dwaine Dillard^{#}	F	United States	Baltimore Bullets	Eastern Michigan (So.)
6	90	Ron Thomas^{#}	F	United States	Seattle SuperSonics	Louisville (Sr.)
6	91	Greg Cluess^{#}	F	United States	New York Knicks	St. John's (Sr.)
6	92	Charles Edge^{#}	F	United States	Phoenix Suns	LeMoyne–Owen (Jr.)
6	93	Henry Bacon^{#}	G	United States	Golden State Warriors	Louisville (Sr.)
6	94	Don Holcomb^{#}	C	United States	Boston Celtics	Memphis (Sr.)
6	95	Mike Stewart^{#}	C	United States	Chicago Bulls	Santa Clara (Jr.)
6	96	Wally Rice^{#}	G	United States	Boston Celtics	Widener (Sr.)
6	97	Sam Simmons^{#}	G	United States	Los Angeles Lakers	Bradley (Sr.)
7	98	Bob Lynn^{#}	F	United States	Portland Trail Blazers	Long Beach State (Sr.)
7	99	Greg Kohls^{#}	G	United States	Buffalo Braves	Syracuse (Sr.)
7	100	Steve Davidson^{#}	F	United States	Cleveland Cavaliers	West Texas State (Sr.)
7	101	Bruce Anderson^{#}	C	United States	Detroit Pistons	Arizona (Sr.)
7	102	Mike Sneed^{#}	F	United States	Kansas City–Omaha Kings	Fayetteville State (Sr.)
7	103	Curtis Pritchett^{#}	F	United States	Philadelphia 76ers	St. Augustine's (Sr.)
7	104	Mike Jackson^{#}	F	United States	Houston Rockets	Cal State Los Angeles (Sr.)
7	105	Billy Pleas^{#}	F	United States	Atlanta Hawks	Detroit (Sr.)
7	106	Marvin Brown^{#}	F	United States	Baltimore Bullets	Jackson State (Sr.)
7	107	Jerry Dunn^{#}	F	United States	Seattle SuperSonics	Western Kentucky (Sr.)
7	108	Tracy Tripucka^{#}	G	United States	New York Knicks	Lafayette (Sr.)
7	109	Bernie Fryer	G	United States	Phoenix Suns	Brigham Young (Sr.)
7	110	Bill Franklin^{#}	F	United States	Golden State Warriors	Purdue (Sr.)
7	111	Steve Previs^{#}	G	United States	Boston Celtics	North Carolina (Sr.)
7	112	Jerry Pender^{#}	G	United States	Chicago Bulls	Fresno State (Sr.)
7	113	Mickey Davis	G/F	United States	Milwaukee Bucks	Pittsburgh Condors (ABA)
8	114	Ruben Vance^{#}	G	United States	Portland Trail Blazers	Kent State (Sr.)
8	115	Andy Denny^{#}	F	United States	Buffalo Braves	South Alabama (Sr.)
8	116	Roger Evans^{#}	F	United States	Cleveland Cavaliers	Kent State (Sr.)
8	117	Ben Kelso	G	United States	Detroit Pistons	Central Michigan (Sr.)
8	118	Jim Kopp^{#}	F	United States	Philadelphia 76ers	Rockhurst (Sr.)
8	119	Jerry Clack^{#}	G	United States	Kansas City–Omaha Kings	Oklahoma State (Sr.)
8	120	Henry Harris^{#}	G	United States	Houston Rockets	Auburn (Sr.)
8	121	Oscar Evans^{#}	G	United States	Atlanta Hawks	Butler (Sr.)
8	122	James Floyd^{#}	F	United States	Baltimore Bullets	Shaw College (Sr.)
8	123	Willie Stoudamire^{#}	G	United States	Seattle SuperSonics	Portland State (Sr.)
8	124	Tom Corde^{#}	G	United States	New York Knicks	Ohio (Sr.)
8	125	Russell Golden^{#}	F	United States	Phoenix Suns	Jackson State (Sr.)
8	126	John Burks^{#}	F	United States	Golden State Warriors	San Francisco (Sr.)
8	127	Sam McCamey^{#}	F	United States	Boston Celtics	Oral Roberts (Sr.)
8	128	Cavin Andersen^{#}	G	United States	Chicago Bulls	Valley City State (Sr.)
8	129	Charles Kirkland^{#}	F	United States	Milwaukee Bucks	Cheyney (Sr.)
9	130	Scott McCandlish^{#}	C	United States	Portland Trail Blazers	Virginia (Sr.)
9	131	John Collins^{#}	F	United States	Buffalo Braves	Brockport (Sr.)
9	132	Greg Starrick^{#}	G	United States	Cleveland Cavaliers	Southern Illinois (Sr.)
9	133	Jesse Mangham^{#}	F	United States	Detroit Pistons	Ferris State (Sr.)
9	134	Steve McMahon^{#}	F	United States	Kansas City–Omaha Kings	Merrimack (Sr.)
9	135	Rod Murray^{#}	G	United States	Philadelphia 76ers	Cal State Los Angeles (Sr.)
9	136	Larry Strozier^{#}	F	United States	Atlanta Hawks	Morehouse (Sr.)
9	137	Ruppert Breedlove^{#}	C	United States	Baltimore Bullets	Oglethorpe (Sr.)
9	138	Dwight Holiday^{#}	G	United States	Seattle SuperSonics	Hawaii (Sr.)
9	139	Tom Sullivan^{#}	F	United States	New York Knicks	Fordham (Sr.)
9	140	Bill Kennedy^{#}	G	United States	Phoenix Suns	Arizona State (Sr.)
9	141	Bill Duwe^{#}	F	United States	Golden State Warriors	California (Sr.)
9	Boston Celtics (forfeited due to selection of ineligible player) (Note: The Celtics selected Mark Wagar of the Ohio State Buckeyes who was a junior and ineligible for the draft. The Celtics mistakenly submitted the wrong name and had instead meant to select Wagar's teammate, Mark Minor. The NBA informed the Celtics that they had to forfeit their choice of Wagar.)					
9	142	Ralph Houston^{#}	F	United States	Chicago Bulls	West Texas State (Sr.)
9	143	Jim Regenold^{#}	G	United States	Milwaukee Bucks	Ball State (Sr.)
10	144	Krešimir Ćosić^{#}	C	Yugoslavia	Portland Trail Blazers	BYU (Jr.)
10	145	Kent Martens^{#}	C	United States	Cleveland Cavaliers	Abilene Christian (Sr.)
10	146	Kent Hollenbeck^{#}	G	United States	Detroit Pistons	Kentucky (Sr.)
10	147	Gary Watson^{#}	F	United States	Philadelphia 76ers	Wisconsin (Sr.)
10	148	David Hall^{#}	F	United States	Kansas City–Omaha Kings	Kansas State (Sr.)
10	149	Jim Clesson^{#}	G	United States	Atlanta Hawks	Tulsa (Sr.)
10	150	Wilbert Loftin^{#}	F	United States	Baltimore Bullets	Southwestern Louisiana (Sr.)
10	151	Dan Steward^{#}	G	United States	Seattle SuperSonics	Washington State (Sr.)
10	152	Richie Garner^{#}	G	United States	New York Knicks	Manhattan (Sr.)
10	153	Al Vilcheck^{#}	F	United States	Phoenix Suns	Louisville (Sr.)
10	154	Marty Hunt^{#}	G	United States	Boston Celtics	Kenyon (Sr.)
10	155	Chuck Taylor^{#}	G	United States	Chicago Bulls	West Liberty State (Sr.)
10	156	Jolly Spight^{#}	G	United States	Milwaukee Bucks	Santa Clara (Sr.)
11	157	Jimmy Wilkins^{#}	G	United States	Portland Trail Blazers	San Diego State (Sr.)
11	158	Jim Prokell^{#}	G	United States	Buffalo Braves	Edinboro (Sr.)
11	159	Floyd Mathew^{#}	F	United States	Kansas City–Omaha Kings	Northern Arizona (Sr.)
11	160	Charles Allen^{#}	G	United States	Atlanta Hawks	Texas Southern (Sr.)
11	161	Arvin Watkins^{#}	F	United States	Baltimore Bullets	Jackson State (Sr.)
11	162	Steve Turner^{#}	C	United States	Seattle SuperSonics	Vanderbilt (Jr.)
11	163	Chic Downing^{#}	F	United States	New York Knicks	Benedictine (Sr.)
11	164	John Belcher^{#}	C	United States	Phoenix Suns	Arkansas State (Sr.)
11	165	Mark Minor	F	United States	Boston Celtics	Ohio State (Sr.)
11	166	Jackie Young^{#}	G	United States	Chicago Bulls	Rocky Mountain (Sr.)
12	167	Frank DeWitt^{#}	F	United States	Buffalo Braves	Virginia (Sr.)
12	168	Len Baltimore^{#}	F	United States	Kansas City–Omaha Kings	George Washington (Sr.)
12	169	James Green^{#}	G	United States	Atlanta Hawks	Paine (Sr.)
12	170	Lloyd Adams^{#}	G	United States	Baltimore Bullets	Rhode Island (Jr.)
12	171	Greg Daust^{#}	F	United States	Seattle SuperSonics	UMSL (Sr.)
12	172	Mark Soderberg^{#}	C	United States	Phoenix Suns	Utah (Sr.)
12	173	Phil Stephens^{#}	F	United States	Boston Celtics	South Carolina State (Sr.)
12	174	Al Cotler^{#}	F	United States	Chicago Bulls	Penn (Sr.)
13	175	Larry Morris^{#}	F	United States	Portland Trail Blazers	Tulsa (Sr.)
13	176	Kim Huband^{#}	G	United States	Buffalo Braves	North Carolina (Sr.)
13	177	Kent Scott^{#}	G	United States	Kansas City–Omaha Kings	Pittsburgh (Sr.)
13	178	Mike Krawczyk^{#}	F	United States	Baltimore Bullets	Loyola (Maryland) (Sr.)
13	179	Kelly Utley^{#}	G	United States	Phoenix Suns	Shaw University (Sr.)
13	180	Mike Barr	G	United States	Chicago Bulls	Duquesne (Sr.)
14	181	Paul Kelley^{#}	F	United States	Portland Trail Blazers	Shaw University (Sr.)
14	182	Craig Corson^{#}	C	United States	Buffalo Braves	North Carolina (Sr.)
14	183	Bob Allen^{#}	F	United States	Kansas City–Omaha Kings	Missouri (Sr.)
14	184	Aubrey Nash^{#}	G	United States	Baltimore Bullets	Kansas (Sr.)
14	185	Cleveland Hill^{#}	F	United States	Seattle SuperSonics	Nicholls (Sr.)
14	186	Ray Golson^{#}	G	United States	Phoenix Suns	West Texas State (Sr.)
14	187	Andrew Pettes^{#}	G	United States	Chicago Bulls	Oklahoma (Sr.)
15	188	Rich Habegger^{#}	F	United States	Portland Trail Blazers	Wake Forest (Sr.)
15	189	Paul Hoffman^{#}	G	United States	Buffalo Braves	St. Bonaventure (Sr.)
15	190	Mike Jeffries^{#}	G	United States	Kansas City–Omaha Kings	Oklahoma State (Sr.)
15	191	Gary Handleman^{#}	G	United States	Baltimore Bullets	Johns Hopkins (Sr.)
15	192	Greg Lowery^{#}	G	United States	Chicago Bulls	Texas Tech (Sr.)
16	193	Mose Adolph^{#}	G	United States	Portland Trail Blazers	Cal State Los Angeles (Sr.)
16	194	Norman Bounds^{#}	F	United States	Buffalo Braves	Brockport (Sr.)
16	195	Mike Peterson^{#}	F	United States	Kansas City–Omaha Kings	Nebraska (Sr.)
16	196	Charles Hall^{#}	F	United States	Chicago Bulls	Western Montana (Sr.)
17	197	John Thornton^{#}	G	United States	Chicago Bulls	South Carolina State (Sr.)
18	198	Ron Manning^{#}	F	United States	Chicago Bulls	Manhattan (Sr.)

== Notable undrafted players ==
These players were not selected in the 1972 draft but played at least one game in the NBA.

Player	Pos.	Nationality	School/club team
Paul McCracken	G	United States	Cal State Northridge (Sr.)

== Trades ==
- ^{a} On April 7, 1972, the Phoenix Suns acquired the fourth pick from the Houston Rockets in exchange for Otto Moore. Previously, the Rockets acquired a first-round pick on December 10, 1971, from the Detroit Pistons in exchange for Jim Davis. The Suns used the pick to draft Corky Calhoun.
- ^{b} On December 9, 1971, the Milwaukee Bucks acquired Curtis Perry and a first-round pick from the Houston Rockets in exchange for Greg Smith and 1973 third-round pick. The Bucks used the pick to draft Russ Lee.
- ^{c} On April 2, 1971, the Detroit Pistons acquired a first-round pick from the Phoenix Suns in exchange for Otto Moore. The Pistons used the pick to draft Bob Nash.
- ^{d} On October 13, 1971, the Los Angeles Lakers acquired a 1973 first-round pick, 1972 and 1973 second-round picks from the Cleveland Cavaliers in exchange for Rick Roberson. The Lakers used the pick to draft Jim Price.
- ^{e} On November 25, 1971, the Seattle SuperSonics acquired 1972 and a future second-round picks from the Philadelphia 76ers in exchange for Bob Rule. The Sonics used the pick to draft Joby Wright.
- ^{f} On November 11, 1970, the Los Angeles Lakers acquired a second-round pick from the Baltimore Bullets in exchange for John Tresvant. The Lakers used the pick to draft Paul Stovall.
- ^{g} On November 15, 1971, the Cleveland Cavaliers acquired a second-round pick and a future pick from the New York Knicks in exchange for Luther Rackley. The Cavaliers used the pick to draft Steve Hawes.
- ^{h} On the draft-day, the Baltimore Bullets acquired a second-round pick from the Phoenix Suns in exchange for Gus Johnson. The Bullets used the pick to draft Tom Patterson.
- ^{i} On March 23, 1971, the Portland Trail Blazers acquired 1971 and 1972 second-round picks and a 1971 third-round pick from the Golden State Warriors (as the San Francisco Warriors) in exchange for Jim Barnett. The Blazers used the pick to draft Dave Twardzik.
- ^{j 1} ^{2} On November 9, 1971, the Cincinnati Royals acquired Jim Fox and a second-round pick from the Chicago Bulls in exchange for Norm Van Lier and a third-round pick. The Royals used the pick to draft Mike Ratliff. The Bulls used the pick to draft Frank Russell.
- ^{k} On September 11, 1971, the Portland Trail Blazers acquired a second-round pick from the Los Angeles Lakers in exchange for LeRoy Ellis. The Blazers used the pick to draft Ollie Johnson.
- ^{l} On August 13, 1971, the Phoenix Suns acquired 1972 and a future third-round picks from the Cleveland Cavaliers in exchange for Greg Howard. The Suns used the pick to draft Scott English.
- ^{k} On October 12, 1969, the Cincinnati Royals acquired Wally Anderzunas and a third-round pick from the Cleveland Cavaliers in exchange for Dave Newmark. The Royals used the pick to draft Ron Riley.

== Early entrants ==
=== College underclassmen ===
Following the success of the first ever NBA Hardship Draft the previous year, the NBA decided to continue implementing the hardship exception for college underclassmen in need for it. Originally, eight college underclassmen signed up for the draft this year, but two of them in St. John's Mel Davis and Siena College's Tony Delgado both declined entry into this year's draft. The following college basketball players successfully applied for an NBA hardship.

- (United States) Walter Gardner – G, Kaskaskia (junior)
- (United States) Bob McAdoo – F/C, North Carolina (junior)
- (United States) Michael Reid - G, UC Riverside (sophomore)
- (United States) Brian Taylor - G, Princeton (junior)
- (United States) John Tinsley - F, Pfeiffer (sophomore)
- (United States) Philmore Westbrook - G, Albemarle (freshman)

== See also ==
- List of first overall NBA draft picks
