= Carl Hausman =

American journalist and writer

Carl Hausman (born July 17, 1953) is Professor of Journalism at Rowan University and the author of several books about media ethics, journalism, and media technology.

== Early life and education ==
Hausman received his B.A. in political science from the University of the State of New York in 1985, an M.A. in media and communications from Antioch University in 1987, and a Ph.D. in Journalism from the Union Institute and University in 1990; he was awarded a Mellon Fellowship in the Humanities that funded post-doctoral research about privacy and ethics at New York University. Hausman’s doctoral dissertation was published by HarperCollins in 1992 as Crisis of Conscience: Perspectives on Journalism Ethics.

== Work ==
He is perhaps most well known for his book Lies We Live By: Defeating Doubletalk and Deception in Advertising, Politics, and the Media, published in 2000. In the book, Hausman maintained that propaganda and misleading communication have become more prevalent in society because those who engage in “a culture of deception” have developed techniques by which a small element of truth can be spun into a duplicitous statement that has a patina of veracity, enabling manipulative communicators to “say the truth, but still tell a lie.”

Lies categorized such deceptions into categories and demonstrated the mechanics of what Hausman dubbed, for example, “veiled variables” and “incognito ifs.” Reviewing Lies in The New York Observer, Michael M. Thomas termed the book a “useful, pretty comprehensive guide to the way we lie now. On the strength of his example and citations, it really is appalling how widely the culture of falsity has spread.”

Hausman also writes and comments about ways in which technology leverages the effects of media, including the use of quickly-produced books as tools of political persuasion and the implications of political information and misinformation that is spread virally. He also writes and lectures about the future of news.

Hausman was a senior fellow at the Institute for Global Ethics in 1995 and edited many of the Institute’s publications until the death of the organization's founder, Rushworth Kidder, in 2012. Hausman told The Chronicle of Philanthropy that he was strongly influenced by Kidder’s contention that technology exponentially magnifies ethical transgressions, citing Kidder’s claim that the Chernobyl nuclear disaster was more an ethical meltdown than a technological failure because it was caused by technicians who ignored safety procedures in order to cut corners on completing required safety tests.

His most recent books have dealt with improving communication skills. Write Like a Pro: Ten Techniques for Getting Your Point Across at Work (and in Life), published by Praeger in 2016, won the 2018 first-place Independent Publisher Book Award in the Writing and Publishing category. Under his pseudonym Carl Dane, he has published a growing body of Western novels and a collection of short stories.

In 2019 Hausman received the Albert Nelson Marquis Lifetime Achievement Award for his work in journalism and higher education. In 2021 he received the Lindback Distinguished Teaching Award at Rowan University.

For the past decade, Hausman has served as the National Chairman of the broadcast judging division of the National Headliner Awards, one of the United States' oldest journalism award programs.

== Selected bibliography ==
- Lies We Live By: Defeating Doubletalk and Deception in Advertising, Politics, and the Media, Routledge, 2000.
- Write Like a Pro: Ten Techniques for Getting Your Point Across at Work (and in Life), Praeger, 2016.
- Present Like a Pro: The Modern Guide to Getting Your Point Across in Meetings, Speeches, and the Media, Praeger, 2017.
- Crisis of Conscience: Perspectives on Journalism Ethics, HarperCollins, 1992.
- Crafting the News for Electronic Media: Writing, Reporting and Producing, Wadsworth, 1991
- The Decision-Making Process in Journalism, Nelson-Hall, 1990
- Modern Radio Production, with Fritz Messere, Philip Benoit, and Lewis B. O’Donnell, Cengage, 9th ed., 2013
