= Bernie Williams (basketball) =

American basketball player (1945–2003)

Personal information
- Born: December 30, 1945 Washington, D.C., U.S.
- Died: September 23, 2003 (aged 57)
- Listed height: 6 ft 3 in (1.91 m)
- Listed weight: 175 lb (79 kg)

Career information
- High school: DeMatha Catholic (Hyattsville, Maryland)
- College: La Salle (1966–1969)
- NBA draft: 1969: 2nd round, 21st overall pick
- Drafted by: San Diego Rockets
- Playing career: 1969–1974
- Position: Point guard
- Number: 18, 35, 11

Career history
- 1969–1971: San Diego Rockets
- 1971–1974: Virginia Squires

Career highlights
- Third-team Parade All-American (1965)

Career NBA and ABA statistics
- Points: 2,622 (9.3 ppg)
- Rebounds: 523 (1.8 rpg)
- Assists: 556 (2.0 apg)
- Stats at NBA.com
- Stats at Basketball Reference

Bernard Williams (December 30, 1945 – September 23, 2003) was an American basketball player who attended DeMatha Catholic High School, a college preparatory high school in Hyattsville, Maryland near Washington, D.C. In 1965 he was a senior and a starter on the DeMatha team that beat New York City's Power Memorial Academy 46–43 on January 30. Power, led by 7' 1" senior Lew Alcindor (later Kareem Abdul-Jabbar) had won 71 games in a row. Sports writers at the time and later called it the greatest high school basketball game ever.

Williams went on to play at La Salle University for four years. As a senior in 1968–69, he averaged 18.4 points per game (scoring 1,230 points in 74 games) and led La Salle to a 23–1 record and a No. 2 national ranking. Unfortunately, the Explorers were ineligible for the NCAA and the National Invitational tournaments because of academic and recruiting violations in prior years. In the 1969 NBA draft, Williams was selected by the San Diego Rockets. He played with the Rockets until 1971 and then played three seasons with the Virginia Squires of the American Basketball Association alongside Julius Erving.

In 1982, Williams was inducted into the Philadelphia Big 5 Hall of Fame. He died of colorectal cancer in 2003.

== Career statistics ==
Legend
GP	Games played	GS	Games started	MPG	Minutes per game
FG%	Field goal percentage	3P%	3-point field goal percentage	FT%	Free throw percentage
RPG	Rebounds per game	APG	Assists per game	SPG	Steals per game
BPG	Blocks per game	PPG	Points per game	**Bold**	Career high

=== NBA/ABA ===
==== Regular season ====
Year	Team	GP	MPG	FG%	3P%	FT%	RPG	APG	SPG	BPG	PPG
1969–70	San Diego (NBA)	72	17.1	.392		.787	**2.2**	**2.3**			8.3
1970–71	San Diego (NBA)	56	12.6	.331		.840	1.5	2.0			5.2
1971–72	Virginia (ABA)	**78**	**21.4**	**.428**	.277	.796	2.0	1.7			10.6
1972–73	Virginia (ABA)	71	21.3	**.428**	.172	.860	1.8	1.9			**12.5**
1973–74	Virginia (ABA)	6	8.5	.316	**.500**	**1.000**	.7	1.2	.2	.0	2.5
Career (NBA)		128	15.1	.371		.808	1.9	2.2			7.0
Career (ABA)		155	20.8	.427	.232	.834	1.8	1.8	.2	.0	11.2
Career (overall)		283	18.3	.406	.232	.824	1.8	2.0	.2	.0	9.3

==== Playoffs ====
Year	Team	GP	MPG	FG%	3P%	FT%	RPG	APG	PPG
1972	Virginia (ABA)	**11**	**32.4**	**.442**	**.500**	.704	**4.3**	**2.1**	**17.2**
1973	Virginia (ABA)	3	8.0	.375	.000	**1.000**	.0	.3	2.3
Career		14	27.1	.439	.400	.714	3.4	1.7	14.0
