= 1972–73 Virginia Squires season =

ABA basketball team season

- Head coach: Al Bianchi
- Arena: Norfolk Scope; Hampton Coliseum; Richmond Coliseum

Results
- Record: 42–42 (.500)
- Place: Division: 3rd (Eastern)
- Playoff finish: Lost in Division Semifinals

Local media
- Television: WTAR 3
- Radio: WTAR

The 1972–73 Virginia Squires season was the third season of the Virginia Squires in the American Basketball Association and their sixth in existence when including the past three seasons they had as the Oakland Oaks and Washington Caps. The Squires actually had one of their early season victories due to forfeiture on October 26, when the Denver Rockets forfeited to them due to their head coach, Alex Hannum, having his Rockets players foul the Squires' players under the presence of a "pressure defense experiment"; that experimental pressure defensive plan in question that they played throughout the second half of the game led to Denver committing 56 fouls, which led to seven of the Rockets' players fouling out of the game entirely, as well as subsequently led to the Squires shooting 56 free-throws throughout the entire fourth quarter of that game. (Official statistics of that night's game were expunged from the record books not long afterward.) Even if the game wasn't considered forfeited by Denver, however, Virginia would have still won that match with a 155–111 blowout score with Julius Erving scoring a game-high 22 points and the Squires scoring an unofficial record-high 53 points in the fourth quarter thanks to all of those free-throws they were allowed to get by Denver's fouls, which led to Virginia making an unofficial record-high 74/92 free-throws scored that night. The Squires had a 21–21 first half period with a five-game winning streak included in that half. In the second half, they finished the season the same way, though they did lose five straight games near the end of the season instead. They finished 4th in points scored at 114.1 per game and 8th in points allowed at a higher 114.4 per game. This was also the debut season of future Hall of Famer George Gervin, who the Squires actually drafted in January 1973's Special Circumstances Draft, but was allowed to play for Virginia early in this time period due to him actually playing semi-professional basketball early on with the Pontiac Chaparrals (not related to the currently existing at the time, but soon to be formerly existing Dallas Chaparrals ABA team that now currently operate as the San Antonio Spurs) in the original, short-lived Continental Basketball Association. In the Division Semifinals, the Squires lost the division semifinals in five games to their stateside divisional rivals, the Kentucky Colonels. The second half of the season would be the only period of time where Julius Erving and George Gervin would play together as teammates, as financial troubles from the team's owner, Earl Foreman, would cause the Squires to trade Erving (alongside former ABA All-Star George Carter) to the New York Nets before the upcoming season began, as well as later trade Gervin away during that same season by the 1974 ABA All-Star Game period that was held in Norfolk, Virginia, which ended up becoming the last straw for many Squires fans' tolerance on their team operations in general once that Gervin trade officially happened.

== ABA Draft ==
Weirdly enough, as of 2025, there has been no official draft records for the first five rounds of the 1972 ABA draft specifically, while every other round after that point has been properly recorded by basketball historians otherwise. Because of the strange dispersity of draft picks not being properly recorded this year after previously being fully recorded in the previous year's draft and the number of rounds potentially being off for even the players being selected this year, the recorded players selected in this year's draft will be marked with a ? for the pick number in particular (as well as certain round numbers, if necessary) in order to showcase the awkward display currently going on with the 1972 ABA draft year in particular (though what is known is that the Squires did pick up the #1 pick of the ABA draft this year through a trade involving the soon-to-be-defunct Pittsburgh Condors, with Virginia also forfeiting what would have been their official first-round pick that would have been at #7 at the time (officially at #9 properly had a couple of other teams not forfeited their first-round picks alongside the Squires) due to Virginia signing Massachusetts forward Julius Erving sometime after the 1971 ABA draft period). However, if any changes come up to where a proper, official recording of the 1972 ABA draft gets released displaying both pick numbers and round numbers for where certain players got selected, please provide the updated (potential) draft ordering with a source confirming the round and pick numbers included here.

| Round | Pick | Player | Position(s) | Nationality | College |
|---|---|---|---|---|---|
| 1 | 1 | Bob McAdoo | C | United States | North Carolina |
| 3? | 25? | Will Franklin | PF | United States | Purdue |
| 6 | 51? | Reggie Bird | G | United States | Princeton |
| 7 | 62? | Al Sanders | PF | United States | LSU |
| 8 | 73? | Billy Shepherd | PG | United States | Butler |
| 9 | 84? | Mike Barr | G | United States | Duquesne |
| 10 | 95? | Rick Aydlett | F | United States | South Carolina |
| 11 | 106? | Kent Hollenbeck | G | United States | Kentucky |
| 12 | 117? | Milton Adams | G | United States | Portland |
| 13 | 128? | Ralph Houston | F | United States | Houston |
| 14 | 139? | Rudolph Peele | G | United States | Norfolk State College |
| 15 | 148? | Scott McCandlish | C | United States | Virginia |
| 16 | 157? | Harry Taylor | G/F | United States | Los Angeles Baptist College |

=== ABA Dispersal Draft ===
Months after the original ABA draft for this year concluded, the ABA held their first ever dispersal draft on July 13, 1972, after it was found out by the ABA itself that neither "The Floridians" nor the Pittsburgh Condors would be able to continue operations either in their original locations or elsewhere in the U.S.A. (or even Canada in the case of "The Floridians"). Unlike the main draft they did during the months of March and April, this draft would last for only six rounds as a one-day deal and would have the nine remaining inaugural ABA teams selecting players that were left over at the time from both "The Floridians" and Pittsburgh Condors franchises (including draft picks from both teams there) and obtain their player rights from there. Any players from either franchise that wouldn't be selected during this draft would be placed on waivers and enter free agency afterward. Interestingly, only 42 total players were selected by the nine remaining ABA teams at the time of the dispersal draft, meaning everyone else that was available from both teams was considered a free agent to the ABA not long afterward. Not only that, the Squires joined the Memphis Pros turned Memphis Tams as one of only two ABA teams to use up all six rounds of their selections in this draft, though the Squires didn't obtain a second first-round pick like Memphis did due to them not being considered one of the four worst ABA teams that season to survive the previous season, but they did get the last pick of the dispersal draft by comparison. Even so, the following players were either Floridians or Condors players that the Squires acquired during this dispersal draft.

| Round | Pick | Player | Position(s) | Nationality | School | ABA Team |
|---|---|---|---|---|---|---|
| 1 | 9 | Swen Nater | C | The Netherlands | UCLA | The Floridians |
| 2 | 18 | Joe Mackey | F | United States | USC | Pittsburgh Condors |
| 3 | 26 | Craig Raymond | C | United States | Brigham Young | The Floridians |
| 4 | 34 | Jim Ligon | PF/C | United States | Kokomo High School (Kokomo, Indiana) | Pittsburgh Condors |
| 5 | 39 | Greg Lowery | G | United States | Texas Tech | The Floridians |
| 6 | 42 | Al Davis | F | United States | Hawaii | The Floridians |

One interesting thing to note with the top pick the Squires acquired in this draft is that the Dutch-born center Swen Nater would end up becoming the 1974 ABA Rookie of the Year despite going undrafted in the 1973 ABA draft period (likely because the ABA already knew the Squires had his rights obtained beforehand through the dispersal draft). Another interesting note in mind from this draft is that Craig Raymond would only be on the Squires for less than a month before the San Diego Conquistadors expansion franchise selected Raymond as their second-round pick from Virginia (potentially as the last pick of the expansion draft that year as well, if not the first pick of the second round there) to join the team in their debut season in the ABA. Yet another interesting note is that Jim Ligon was the only player selected in the dispersal draft to not go to college at all due to him not only having low grades during his time at Kokomo High School, but also because he had spent a few years in prison for "assault and battery with intent to gratify sexual desires" (though apparently being able to play for the Indiana Reformatory's basketball team during that time) after previously spending a year with the Harlem Magicians, with him joining the ABA being considered a major second chance at changing his life around for the better (to the point of being named an ABA All-Star back in 1969). Finally, the Squires' last two selections of the dispersal draft, Greg Lowery from Texas Tech University and Al Davis from the University of Hawaii, would involve players that "The Floridians" did not draft during the original 1972 ABA draft period, yet the franchise was somehow able to acquire onto their team sometime between April 12 (after the 1972 ABA draft ended) and July 13 when the dispersal draft happened, with the Al Davis inclusion being weirder due to him previously being drafted by the Denver Rockets near the end of the draft instead of by "The Floridians" franchise in the first place. Regardless, neither one of these guys alongside Pittsburgh Condors draft pick turned Virginia Squires selection Joe Mackey would end up playing either for the Squires or anyone else in the ABA in general.

== Roster ==
1972–73 Virginia Squires roster
Players

| Pos. | No. | Player | Height | Weight | DOB | From |
|---|---|---|---|---|---|---|
| SG | 34 | Mike Barr | 6 ft 3 in (1.91 m) | 180 lb (82 kg) | October 19, 1950 | Duquesne |
| C | 42 | Jim Eakins | 6 ft 11 in (2.11 m) | 215 lb (98 kg) | May 24, 1946 | BYU |
| SF | 32 | Julius Erving | 6 ft 7 in (2.01 m) | 210 lb (95 kg) | February 22, 1950 | UMass |
| PF | 23 | Will Franklin | 6 ft 7 in (2.01 m) | 220 lb (100 kg) | October 19, 1949 | Purdue |
| SG | 44 | George Gervin | 6 ft 7 in (2.01 m) | 180 lb (82 kg) | April 27, 1952 | Eastern Michigan |
| SF | 30 | George Irvine | 6 ft 6 in (1.98 m) | 200 lb (91 kg) | February 1, 1948 | Washington |
| PF | 24 | Neil Johnson | 6 ft 7 in (2.01 m) | 220 lb (100 kg) | April 17, 1943 | Creighton |
| PF | 12 | Jim Ligon | 6 ft 7 in (2.01 m) | 210 lb (95 kg) | February 22, 1944 | Kokomo High School |
| PF | 51 | Erwin Mueller | 6 ft 8 in (2.03 m) | 230 lb (104 kg) | March 12, 1944 | San Francisco |
| PF | 3 | Al Sanders | 6 ft 7 in (2.01 m) | 240 lb (109 kg) | January 1, 1950 | LSU |
| PG | 21 | Billy Shepherd | 5 ft 10 in (1.78 m) | 160 lb (73 kg) | November 18, 1949 | Butler |
| C | 35 | Willie Sojourner | 6 ft 8 in (2.03 m) | 225 lb (102 kg) | September 10, 1948 | Weber State |
| PG | 14 | Roland Taylor | 6 ft 0 in (1.83 m) | 175 lb (79 kg) | March 13, 1946 | La Salle |
| PG | 13 | Dave Twardzik | 6 ft 1 in (1.85 m) | 175 lb (79 kg) | September 20, 1950 | Old Dominion |
| SG | 11 | Bernie Williams | 6 ft 3 in (1.91 m) | 175 lb (79 kg) | December 30, 1945 | La Salle |

Coaches
Head coach
- Al Bianchi

Legend
- (DP) Unsigned draft pick
- (FA) Free agent
- (S) Suspended
- Injured

Roster

== Final standings ==
=== Eastern Division ===
| Team | W | L | % | GB |
|---|---|---|---|---|
| Carolina Cougars | 57 | 27 | .679 | - |
| Kentucky Colonels | 56 | 28 | .667 | 1 |
| Virginia Squires | 42 | 42 | .500 | 15 |
| New York Nets | 30 | 54 | .357 | 27 |
| Memphis Tams | 24 | 60 | .286 | 33 |

== ABA Playoffs ==
ABA Eastern Division Semifinals

| Game | Date | Location | Score | Record | Attendance |
| 1 | March 30 | Kentucky | 129–101–129 | 0–1 | 4,692 |
| 2 | April 1 | Kentucky | 109–94 | 1–1 | 5,139 |
| 3 | April 3 | Norfolk (Virginia) | 113–115 (OT) | 1–2 | 9,621 |
| 4 | April 6 | Hampton (Virginia) | 90–108 | 1–3 | 8,644 |
| 5 | April 7 | Kentucky | 93–114 | 1–4 | 16,887 |

Squires lose series, 4–1

== Awards and honors ==
1973 ABA All-Star Game selections (game played on February 6, 1973)

- Julius Erving

ABA All-Rookie Team

- George Gervin
