= New Lincoln School =

Location
- 210 E 77th Street; New York, New York 10075; United States

Information
- School type: Private; progressive
- Established: 1948
- Status: closed
- Closed: 1988
- CEEB code: 333845
- Grades: K-12
- Average class size: 20
- Colors: Blue and gold
- Newspaper: Lincoln Live Wire
- Website: http://www.newlincoln.org/

The New Lincoln School was a private experimental coeducational school in Manhattan, New York enrolling students from kindergarten through grade 12.

== History ==
New Lincoln's predecessor was founded as Lincoln School in 1917 by the Rockefeller-funded General Education Board as "a pioneer experimental school for newer educational methods," under the aegis of Columbia University's Teachers College. In 1941 Teachers College merged Lincoln School with Horace Mann School, which it operated as a demonstration school. When Teachers College closed down the combined school in 1946, parents of Lincoln School enrollees established the New Lincoln School in 1948 as "an extension of the philosophy which made those [predecessor] schools famous," i.e., to carry on the tradition of progressive, experimental education, concentrating on the individual child, offering an interdisciplinary core program as well as electives in elementary grades, and emphasizing the arts.

In 1956, the school acquired the former Boardman School on East 82nd Street and moved its Lower School (through second grade) to that campus, under the coordination of Terry Spitalny. In 1974, the school moved to 210 East 77th Street. The school merged with the Walden School in Fall 1988 to become the New Walden Lincoln School, which ultimately closed in Summer 1991.

The progressive education movement had a significant impact on curriculum and instruction in American schools. For example, as a demonstration school, New Lincoln, like its predecessors, attracted widespread attention, including about 1,000 visitors each year. Eleanor Roosevelt attended the school’s tenth anniversary celebration and conference and wrote in her syndicated newspaper column that “this day was one of the most stimulating that I have spent in a long time.”

== Campus ==
The New Lincoln School building had previously been the 110th Street Community Center. An eight-story building that had been recently renovated and had a swimming pool in the basement, it was further renovated to meet the new school's needs of a cafeteria, classrooms, laboratories, and a library.

After the school closed the West 110th Street site became home to the Lincoln Correctional Facility, a minimum-security work-release center, which itself closed in 2019. In 2026, developers announced financing was secured for construction of a 22-story affordable housing building. The original structure will be retained. The project will yield 105 cooperative homeownership units. The 148,000-square-foot structure is expected to become New York City’s tallest affordable housing development. The East 77th Street campus has been occupied by the Birch Wathen School since 1989.

== Racial integration ==
Prominent educator William Heard Kilpatrick (a student of John Dewey’s) assisted in founding New Lincoln and became chair of its board. He believed that education was critically important to combat the evil of prejudice. As a result in the 1950s New Lincoln’s board included several prominent black people, including Kenneth Clark, psychologist, and Ralph Bunche, Undersecretary of the United Nations. One of the goals for the school was to help students become competent “in relating constructively with a variety of human beings from different economic levels, religions, races, and nationalities.”

Starting in the 1950s, a number of influential Black people enrolled their children at New Lincoln including Harry Belafonte (singer, songwriter, activist and actor), Robert Carter (a prominent civil rights lawyer and judge), Faith Ringgold (painter, writer, sculptor and quilter), and Eileen Jackson Southern (the first black woman to be tenured at Harvard University). After the Supreme Court’s Brown vs. Board of Education desegregation decision, Minnijean Brown was one of the students was part of the integration of the Little Rock, Arkansas public schools. In 1958, after she was expelled from Little Rock’s Central High School, and at the urging of director John Brooks, New Lincoln offered her a scholarship to attend the school, which she accepted.

Initially only a small percentage of New Lincoln students were Black or members of other minority groups. By 1970, however, New Lincoln had among the highest percentages of minorities in New York private schools (22%) and more than 60% of its scholarship fund was spent to support minority students. In his memoir, then-director of the school Harold Haizlip wrote that, “New Lincoln was firmly committed to integration. Over time, the board, faculty, and parents decided to increase the minority presence in the school beyond a token level and set fundraising priorities and targets to make this possible.” As a result, many notable alumni, such as some of those listed below, are people of color.

Several important leaders of the school were black. Mabel Smythe, who was head of the high school from 1959 to 1969, “went to various churches all over Harlem” to look for potential students from that community. (Before joining New Lincoln in the mid-1950s, Smythe assisted Thurgood Marshall at the NAACP Legal Defense Fund, and after leaving New Lincoln she became Ambassador to Cameroon and Equatorial Guinea.) Harold Haizlip, director of the school from 1968-1971, later became Commissioner of Education for the U.S. Virgin Islands for eight years. Verne Oliver had a distinguished teaching career at New Lincoln beginning in 1957, and became director of the school from 1971–1974. In 1963, Oliver arranged for Ralph Ellison to speak with the senior class about his award-winning book Invisible Man. Also in 1963, Kenneth and Mamie Clark (founders of the Northside Center for Child Development, housed on a floor of the New Lincoln School) arranged with Malcolm X for Mamie to take two 12th grade students, one black and one white, to meet with Malcolm X at a black Muslim coffee shop on Lenox Avenue, in Harlem. During that era, Malcolm X seldom spoke to white people.

== Notable alumni ==
- Lisa Aronson Fontes, psychologist and author
- Robin Bartlett, actress
- Shari Belafonte, actress
- Minnijean Brown of the Little Rock Nine
- Shirley Clarke, filmmaker
- Suzanne de Passe, film and television producer
- Brandon deWilde, actor
- Donald H. Elliott, urban planner
- Bonnie Erbé journalist and television host
- Tisa Farrow, actress
- Maria Foscarinis, founder of the National Law Center on Homelessness & Poverty
- Thelma Golden, curator
- Andrew Hacker, political scientist
- Deborah Holland, singer-songwriter and film composer
- Charles Kadushin, psychologist and professor
- Steve Knight, musician
- David Lowenthal, geographer and historian
- Dinah Manoff, stage, film, and television actress, also a television director
- Robert M. Morgenthau, lawyer, New York City District Attorney (Lincoln School)
- Josh Mostel, actor
- Jill Nelson, writer
- Stanley Nelson Jr., filmmaker
- Deborah Offner, actress
- Amy Oppenheimer, lawyer
- Adrian Piper, artist
- Stephen Porter Dunn, anthropologist and poet
- Richard Ravitch, chair of the Metropolitan Transit Authority, New York state lieutenant governor (Lincoln School)
- Mason Reese, actor
- Charles A. Reich, legal and social scholar
- David Rieff, nonfiction writer and policy analyst
- Tad Robinson, singer, harmonica player, and songwriter
- Vicki Sue Robinson singer
- David Rockefeller banker (Lincoln School)
- Nelson Rockefeller politician (Lincoln School)
- Elizabeth Sackler, philanthropist
- Victor Scheinman, robotic pioneer
- Brooke Shields, model, actress
- Nina Simons, co-founder & co-CEO of Bioneers
- Michele Wallace, author and professor
- Matthew Wilder, musician
- Jon Wolfsthal, national security expert and journalist
- Michael Wright, actor
- David Benjamin Oppenheimer - clinical professor of law at UC Berkeley School of Law, faculty co-director of the pro bono program and the director of the UC Berkeley Center on Comparative Equality and Anti-Discrimination Law

== School directors ==
- John J. Brooks (1948–1959)
- E. Francis Bowditch (1959–1960)
- Gerhardt E. Rast (1960-1963)
- Edgar S. Bley (1963-1964)
- John J. Formanek (1964–1968)
- Harold C. Haizlip (1968–1971)
- Verne Oliver (1971-1974)
- Collin Reed (1974-1987)
- George Cohan (1987–1988)

== In popular culture ==
A benefit concert for the school on April 19, 1959, at Carnegie Hall by Harry Belafonte was one of two such concerts recorded and released as Belafonte at Carnegie Hall. The other benefit concert, for the Wiltwyck Schooln in Kingston, New York on April 20, netted $58,000 for the school.
