= Lez Edmond =

American philosopher

Lez Edmond (May 9, 1932 - April 2017) was an American philosopher, social activist, civil rights journalist, public intellectual author and academic primarily concerning the Civil rights movement (1865–1896).

== Early life ==
Edmonds was born in Jacksonville, Florida. He was raised a Seventh-day Adventist who initially attended Adelphi University for his BA and MA degree. He later earned his PhD from Union Institute. Edmonds stated in an interview that he was forced into Civil Rights while working for an electronic store. It was here that a German co-worker called him a "god-damn black nigger." When Edmonds reported this to HR, they stated he misheard this.

== Politics ==
Edmonds believed that "Democrats and Dixiecrats" are the same thing. He was a proponent of the use of the Schomburg Center in Harlem. He was a proponent of the Freedom Now Party. He was not a major fan of outside Civil Right leaders in his quote from 1964, he stated "to employ outside agitator rhetoric "is to imply that the [local] black community is neither capable nor has the desire to do anything like this". Edmonds was a Civil Rights activist in Harlem. According to the book, Democracy with a Gun: America and the Policy of Force, Lez Edmond was an intellectual and friend of Malcolm X. He urged Malcolm X to stay in the background for a while to avoid danger but his efforts failed. He appeared in the Autobiography of Malcolm X and was an associate of Stokely Carmichael whom he set up interviews with. Malcolm X put up a vote in late February 1965 of whether or not to speak at an upcoming event. Edmonds voted against him speaking at this event but the otherside prevailed. At the vote Malcolm and Edmonds spoke, "He put his arm around me and said, 'Brother, you seem to be very upset.' I said, 'I am.' But I didn't see any fear in his eyes." This event was at the Audubon Ballroom, where Malcolm X was assassinated. Following the death of Malcolm X, Edmonds kept in touch with Betty Shabazz. Edmond was a member and braintrust of the Organization of Afro-American Unity Edmond was a friend of Malcolm X and appeared in the cover of the latter's autobiography.

== Journalism ==
He was the author of the book African History: An Illustrated Handbook, along with Earl Sweeting. Edmonds covered the Harlem riot of 1964 under the title "Harlem Diary: The Untold Story of the American Nightmare" for Ramparts magazine. Edmonds covered the riots in great detail including police shootings. Edmonds had access to many areas and held a United Nations press credential. He appeared in the book "American Journalism, 1963-1973" He also appeared as a subject in Ramparts. Edmonds wrote A Source Book of Karl Marx's Letters About Abraham Lincoln and His Strategic Goal in the Civil War: The Destratification of American Society with Louis Gesualdi in 2014.

== Influence ==
The book Do Not Hold Doors by Jeffrey Dessources was written by the influences of Ishmael Reed, Cornel West, Jean Michel Basquiat, Eddie Glaude, Lez Edmond, and John Lowney. He was also an influence in the making of The Souls of Black Girls, produced by Daphne S. Valerius.

== Academia ==
Edmonds was a faculty member at St. John's University (New York City), where he served on the Multicultural Advisory Committee and directed the Multicultural and Ethnic Studies program. He interacted with basketball players, including Ron Artest, expressing his disappointment when Artest left for the NBA before completing his education. Edmonds was a professor of African American Studies and actively supported Black Solidarity Day, in addition to being an enthusiastic art collector.

== Personal life ==
Edmond died in April 2017. He has one known daughter, LezAnne Edmond.
