= Elizabeth Sackler =

American historian and philanthropist (born 1948)

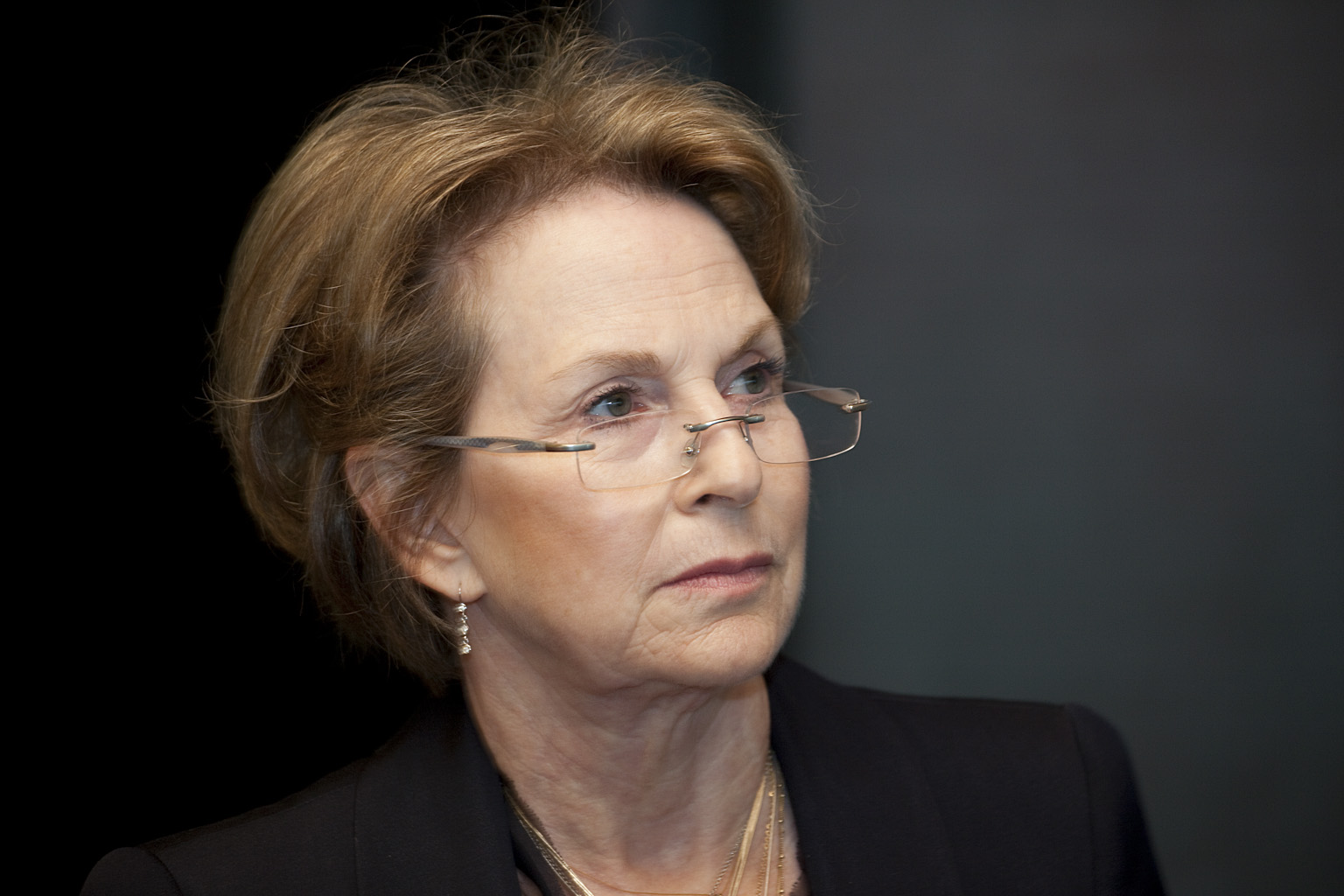
- Sackler in 2012
- Born: Elizabeth Ann Sackler; February 19, 1948 (age 78); New York City, New York, U.S.
- Other name: Elizabeth A. Sackler
- Education: New Lincoln School; Union Institute & University (PhD)
- Occupation: Non-profit executive
- Years active: 2000–present
- Children: 2, including Michael Sackler-Berner
- Father: Arthur M. Sackler
- Family: Sackler

Elizabeth Ann Sackler (born February 19, 1948) is an American public historian, arts activist, and the daughter of Arthur M. Sackler and descendant of the Sackler family. She is the founder of the American Indian Ritual Object Repatriation Foundation and the Elizabeth A. Sackler Center for Feminist Art at the Brooklyn Museum.

== Early life and education ==
In 1966, Sackler graduated from New Lincoln School, an experimental private high school in New York City, where she became involved in activism. In 1997, Sackler received her PhD with a concentration in public history from Union Institute & University. She has a Jewish ancestry.

== Career ==
=== Early work ===
Sackler was the founding president of the American Indian Ritual Object Repatriation Foundation. She is also President of The Arthur M. Sackler Foundation and the Elizabeth A. Sackler Foundation.

=== Brooklyn Museum ===
In 2007, she founded the Elizabeth A. Sackler Center for Feminist Art, the first museum center devoted to female artists and feminist art, located at the Brooklyn Museum. A centerpiece of the center's collection is Judy Chicago's installation of her work, The Dinner Party, which is located at the Brooklyn Museum. Sackler and Chicago had been friends since the 1970s.

In June 2014, Sackler became the first woman to be elected Chairman by the Brooklyn Museum Board of Trustees, a position she held until June 2016. She has served as a member of the Board of Trustees of the Brooklyn Museum since 2000. More recently, Sackler's work has focused on issues related to women in prison, including the program series States of Denial: The Illegal Incarceration of Women, Children, and People of Color as well as the exhibition Women of York: Shared Dining, both at the Brooklyn Museum's Elizabeth A. Sackler Center for Feminist Art.

== Family ==
Sackler was born in New York City to Arthur M. Sackler, psychiatrist, entrepreneur and philanthropist and Else Jorgensen, from Denmark. Sackler has two children, Laura Sackler and Michael Sackler-Berner.

== Connection to Purdue ==
In October 2017, Esquire and The New Yorker published critical articles outlining connections among Purdue Pharma, the larger Sackler family and Oxycontin's role in the opioid crisis. In response, Elizabeth Sackler claimed that neither she, nor her children, "benefited in any way" from the sale of Oxycontin or ever held shares in Purdue Pharma. Articles confirmed that her father's option in a different pharmaceutical company, Purdue Frederick, were sold shortly after his death in 1987, to Purdue Pharma owners Mortimer and Raymond Sackler, years before the advent of Oxycontin. Online outlet Hyperallergic reviewed legal documents confirming her statement, and later articles in the New York Times, Associated Press, and other outlets published clarifications and corrections all confirming her branch of the family's separation from Purdue Pharma and all Oxycontin profits. Elizabeth Sackler said she admired Nan Goldin and all activists seeking to hold Purdue accountable for "morally abhorrent" behavior.

== Honors and awards ==
- 1994: Native American Film and Video Celebration, Lincoln Center (New York, NY), Honorary Award, Executive Producer Life Spirit
- 1998: The Union Institute (Cincinnati, OH), Sussman Award for Academic Excellence
- 1999: Yurok Tribal Council (Eureka, CA), Honor
- 2002: Brooklyn Museum (Brooklyn, NY), Community Committee's Women in the Arts Award
- 2003: Women's eNews (New York, NY), 21 Leaders of the 21st Century Award
- 2004: Women's Caucus for Art (Seattle, WA), President's Award
- 2005: Drums Along The Hudson (New York, NY), Native American of the Year
- 2006: ArtTable Award, Distinguished Service to the Visual Arts
- 2007: Moore College of Art, Visionary Woman Award.
- 2015: Studio Arts College International (SACI), Honorary MFA degree

== Memberships and affiliations ==
- National Council on Public History, member
- Metropolitan Museum of Art, Fellow for Life
- Institute of American Indian Arts Museum (Santa Fe, NM), Founder's Circle
- 1987–present: The Arthur M. Sackler Foundation (New York, NY), CEO
- 1992–present: American Indian Ritual Object Repatriation Foundation (New York, NY), Founder and President
- 1995–1999: Smithsonian Institution (Washington, D.C.), Founding President, Friends of the Freer and Sackler Galleries
- 2000–present: National Museum of Women in the Arts (Washington, D.C.), National Advisory Board
- 2000–2018: Brooklyn Museum (Brooklyn, NY), Board of Trustees, Collections Committee, Executive Committee
  - 2014–2016: Chairman, Board of Trustees.
- 2001–present: Elizabeth A. Sackler Foundation (New York, NY), President
- 2001–2006: New Mexico Statuary Hall Foundation, Office of Indian Affairs (Santa Fe, NM), Board Member for the National Statuary Hall Collection, Washington, D.C.

== See also ==
- !Women Art Revolution – Sackler, among others, was interviewed for this film.

== Works and publications ==
- Sackler, Elizabeth A. (2006). "Chapter 6. Calling for a Code of Ethics in the Indian Art Market". In King, Elaine A.; Levin, Gail (eds.). Ethics and the Visual Arts. New York: Allworth Press. pp. 89–104. ISBN 978-1-581-15600-3. OCLC 859537911.
