= Maria Foscarinis =

American lawyer and activist (born 1956)

- Born: New York City, U.S.
- Education: Barnard College (BA), Columbia University (MA, JD)

Maria Foscarinis is the founder of the National Homelessness Law Center (formerly known as the National Law Center on Homelessness & Poverty), a not-for-profit organization based in Washington, D.C., United States, and dedicated to using the power of the law to end homelessness in America. From its founding in June 1989 to March 2021, Foscarinis served as Executive Director of the organization, which is She is a primary architect of the Stewart B. McKinney Homeless Assistance Act of 1987, now known as the McKinney–Vento Homeless Assistance Act, the first major federal legislation addressing homelessness.

Foscarinis grew up in a middle-class, Greek immigrant family in Upper East Side, Manhattan, New York. Foscarinis graduated from the New Lincoln School, received a B.A., magna cum laude, from Barnard College, where she was elected to Phi Beta Kappa; a Master of Arts (in Philopsophy) from the Graduate School of Arts and Sciences at Columbia University, where she was a John Dewy Fellow; and a J.D. from Columbia Law School, where she was an editor of the Law Review.

== Career ==
Before entering the advocacy field, Foscarinis was a law clerk at the U.S. Court of Appeals for the Second Circuit from 1981 to 1982. She was a litigation associate from 1982 to 1985. While at the firm she took a pro bono case representing a class of homeless families who had been denied emergency shelter in a federal court case.

In 1985, Foscarinis left her job at the law firm and established and directed the Washington, D.C., office of the National Coalition for the Homeless. She has directed campaigns to enact legislation to aid homeless people, including the 1987 McKinney-Vento Homeless Assistance Act, the first major federal legislation to address homelessness, and has litigated repeatedly to establish and enforce the legal rights of homeless people. She has campaigned for recognition of the human right to housing in the United States; she has written extensively on homelessness and on legal rights of homeless people, for both general and legal audiences in U.S. and international publications.

Since 2018, she has been on the adjunct faculty of Columbia Law School, co-teaching a seminar on law and policy of homelessness. She has received numerous awards and been profiled in publications including the New York Times Sunday Magazine, the Los Angeles Times, the Washingtonian, and the English language edition of Kathimerini. In 2021, she was a Practitioner Resident at the Rockefeller Foundation Center in Bellagio, Italy.

She is the author of And Housing for All: The Fight to End Homelessness in America, published June 3, 2025 by Prometheus Books. She has been selected as a 2025-2026 U.S. Fulbright Scholar to Brazil.
