= Karyl McBride =

American author and marriage and family therapist

- Education: University of Wyoming (B.A.); University of Northern Colorado (M.A. and Ed.S.); The Union Institute (Ph.D.)
- Occupations: Author, marriage and family therapist
- Writing career
- Notable works: Will I Ever Be Good Enough?; Will I Ever Be Free of You?
- Website: www.karylmcbridephd.com

Karyl McBride is an American author and marriage and family therapist. She has written several books about narcissistic relationships, including Will I Ever Be Good Enough? Healing the Daughters of Narcissistic Mothers.

== Career ==
McBride has had a forty-year career as a licensed marriage and family therapist. Her practice has focused on recovery from the effects of relationships with narcissists, and her clients have mostly been women.

She specialized in treating daughters of narcissistic mothers for over 17 years before writing the self-help book Will I Ever Be Good Enough? Healing the Daughters of Narcissistic Mothers in 2008. In 2012, she launched online workshops on her website. McBride's second book, Will I Ever Be Free of You? How to Navigate a High-Conflict Divorce from a Narcissist and Heal Your Family, was published in 2015 and featured in The New York Times Well Book Club.

== Books ==
- Will I Ever Be Good Enough? Healing the Daughters of Narcissistic Mothers (2008)
- Will I Ever Be Free of You? How to Navigate a High-Conflict Divorce from a Narcissist and Heal Your Family (2015)
- Will the Drama Ever End? Untangling and Healing from the Harmful Effects of Parental Narcissism (2023)
