= Neil Johnson (basketball) =

American basketball player (born 1943)

Personal information
- Born: April 17, 1943 (age 83) Jackson, Michigan, U.S.
- Listed height: 6 ft 7 in (2.01 m)
- Listed weight: 220 lb (100 kg)

Career information
- High school: George Washington (New York City, New York)
- College: Creighton (1964–1966)
- NBA draft: 1966: 1st round, 15th overall pick
- Drafted by: Baltimore Bullets
- Playing career: 1966–1973
- Position: Power forward / center
- Number: 11, 12

Career history
- 1966–1968: New York Knicks
- 1968–1970: Phoenix Suns
- 1970–1973: Virginia Squires

Career highlights
- ABA All-Star (1971)

Career NBA and ABA statistics
- Points: 2,633 (6.9 ppg)
- Rebounds: 2,003 (5.3 rpg)
- Assists: 632 (1.7 apg)
- Stats at NBA.com
- Stats at Basketball Reference

Neil A. Johnson (born April 17, 1943) is an American former basketball player born in Jackson, Michigan.

A 6'7" forward/center from Creighton University, Johnson played four seasons in the National Basketball Association (NBA) as a member of the New York Knicks (1966–1968) and Phoenix Suns (1968–1970), then spent three seasons (1970–1973) in the American Basketball Association with the Virginia Squires. He averaged 6.9 points and 5.3 rebounds per game in his professional career and appeared in the 1971 ABA All-Star Game.

Known as an "enforcer", Johnson is remembered in the ABA oral history book Loose Balls for punching Warren Jabali in a game between the Virginia Squires and Denver Rockets. Referee John Vanak called the punch "the most devastating punch [he'd] ever seen on the court". According to Vanak, Jabali was one of the most physical players in the ABA, and had been shoving Johnson and his teammates throughout the game until Johnson retaliated. Dave Twardzik of the Squires recalled, "It scared the hell out of me, but the guys on my team were loving it because the whole league hated Jabali."

== Career statistics ==
Legend
GP	Games played	GS	Games started	MPG	Minutes per game
FG%	Field goal percentage	3P%	3-point field goal percentage	FT%	Free throw percentage
RPG	Rebounds per game	APG	Assists per game	SPG	Steals per game
BPG	Blocks per game	PPG	Points per game	**Bold**	Career high

=== NBA/ABA ===
==== Regular season ====
Year	Team	GP	GS	MPG	FG%	3P%	FT%	RPG	APG	PPG
1966–67	New York	51	**3**	10.2	.345		.663	3.3	.7	3.4
1967–68	New York	43	1	6.7	.415		.479	1.7	.8	2.6
1968–69	Phoenix	**80**		16.5	.481		.621	5.0	1.7	5.8
1969–70	Phoenix	28		4.9	.333		.667	1.7	.4	1.7
1970–71	Virginia (ABA)	78		23.6	**.525**	.000	**.749**	8.6	2.3	**12.7**
1971–72	Virginia	31		**28.2**	.469	**.333**	.691	**9.2**	**2.5**	10.4
1972–73	Virginia	69		20.9	.490	.000	.660	5.3	2.3	7.6
Career (NBA)		202	4	11.2	.426		.613	3.4	1.1	4.0
Career (ABA)		178		23.3	.504	.167	.711	7.4	2.3	10.3
Career (overall)		380	4	16.9	.479	.167	.673	5.3	1.7	6.9
All-Star (ABA)		1		4.0	.000	–	–	1.0	.0	.0

==== Playoffs ====
Year	Team	GP	GS	MPG	FG%	3P%	FT%	RPG	APG	PPG
1967	New York	4	0	16.0	.296		**.875**	5.8	1.3	5.8
1968	New York	2	0	3.0	**.500**		–	1.5	.0	2.0
1970	Phoenix	2		3.5	.333		–	2.0	.0	1.0
1971	Virginia (ABA)	**12**		**21.1**	.446	**1.000**	.659	**8.3**	**2.7**	**9.3**
1973	Virginia (ABA)	5		19.6	**.500**	–	.750	4.2	1.0	6.4
Career (NBA)		8	0	9.6	.324		.875	3.8	.6	3.6
Career (ABA)		17		20.6	.458	1.000	.673	7.1	2.2	8.5
Career (overall)		25	0	17.1	.428	1.000	.700	6.0	1.7	6.9
