= National Homelessness Law Center =

American nonprofit organization

- Abbreviation: NLCHP
- Formation: 1989
- Founders: Maria Foscarinis
- Type: 501(c)3 non-profit organization
- Headquarters: 2000 M St NW Suite 210, Washington, DC 20036
- Location: Washington, D.C.
- Region served: United States
- Website: homelesslaw.org
- Formerly called: National Law Center on Homelessness and Poverty

The National Homelessness Law Center (NHLC), formerly known as the National Law Center on Homelessness and Poverty (NLCHP), is an American nonprofit organization that uses the power of the law to end and prevent homelessness, through training, advocacy, impact litigation, and public education. NHLC was founded in 1989 by Maria Foscarinis and is based in Washington, D.C.

== History ==
In the mid-1980s, NLCHP's founder, Maria Foscarinis, was a lawyer working at Sullivan & Cromwell when she volunteered to represent homeless families on a pro bono basis. After seeing the impact of first-rate legal advocacy on the lives of homeless people, Maria left the firm with a new goal; to end homelessness in America. In 1985, she established and directed the Washington, DC office of the National Coalition for the Homeless. She directed campaigns to enact federal legislation to aid the homeless and went on to become an architect of the 1987 McKinney–Vento Homeless Assistance Act, the first major federal legislation to address homelessness.

In 1989, she established the National Law Center on Homelessness & Poverty (the Law Center). The organization changed its name to NHLC in 2020.

== See also ==
- Homelessness in the United States
- McKinney–Vento Homeless Assistance Act
