= Michael Sackler-Berner =

American songwriter, singer, and guitarist

- Born: October 12, 1983 (age 42); New York City, United States
- Occupations: Singer; songwriter
- Instruments: Vocals; guitar
- Website: www.msbrecords.com

Michael Sackler-Berner (born October 12, 1983), aka MSB, is an American songwriter, recording artist, guitarist, singer and actor.

== Early life ==
Michael was born in New York City in Jewish family. He began playing guitar and songwriting at the age of 11, playing in numerous bands throughout his teen years. He attended McGill University for Music Technology. MSB's first professional band was Hearts of Palm, based in Montreal, Quebec. After releasing a full-length album, the band had national television licenses on NBC and CBS, and two regional tours. Their final performance was at the international Live 8 festival in 2005.

== Solo career ==
MSB performed solo concerts in Greenwich Village, New York City from 2006 to 2009. His debut album, MSB, was released in 2010, produced by Bob Thiele Jr., and featured contributions from longtime Bob Dylan bandmates Jim Keltner and David Mansfield. Songs from MSB went on to be licensed over 40 times on cable and network television programs and films including FX's Sons of Anarchy, Netflix's Bloodline, ABC's The Lying Game, and NBC's Law and Order. Sackler-Berner was then signed to Razor and Tie Music Publishing where he wrote for other artists including Enisa, Ari Hest and Leo Sidran. A record contract and release on CEN/Sony Music in 2018 followed. MSB is currently published by Duchamp/Kobalt and under contract with Wax Records/Universal Music Canada.

Sackler-Berner performs regularly at Joe's Pub at The Public Theater in New York City, as well as other clubs around the Tri State Area.

2010 – "MSB" – produced by Bob Thiele Jr.

2011 – "Shimmer and Shine" – produced by David Kahne.

2015 – "Fragile Magic" – produced by Leo Sidran.

2015 – "Beginning, End, and In-Between" – produced by Marshall Crenshaw and Stewart Lerman.

2017 – "Accounting for Taste" – produced by Leo Sidran.

2018 – "Short Stories" – produced by Joel Hamilton

2023 – "Borrowed Time" – produced by MSB and Nick Movshon

== The Slim Kings ==
Sackler-Berner founded rock band The Slim Kings in 2013 with drummer Liberty DeVitto. The band has released three albums, Fresh Socks, Expensive Habits, and The King's County Classic. The Slim Kings have toured alongside ZZ Top, Los Lonely Boys, Southside Johnny and the Asbury Jukes, Spin Doctors, and other headliners. They have had music featured in over a dozen television programs including ABC's Alaska Diaries, Showtime's Nurse Jackie, NBC's Chicago Fire, and Lifetime's Army Wives.

== Family ==
Sackler-Berner is the son of Elizabeth Sackler and television and film producer Fred Berner. He is the grandson of Milton Berner and Arthur M. Sackler.

== Acting ==
Sackler-Berner has had television roles on Law & Order and Law and Order: Criminal Intent. He also had small roles in the Disney feature film, Straight Talk, and HBO film, A Dog Year.
