= Samuel Baskin =

American psychologist, educational reformer

- Education: Brooklyn College, New York University
- Scientific career
- Institutions: Stephens College, Antioch College, Union Institute & University

Samuel Baskin was an American psychologist and educational reformer who served on the faculty of Stephens College, Antioch College and was the first president of the Union Institute & University.

Baskin received his undergraduate education at Brooklyn College and his Ph.D. from New York University. While director of educational planning at Antioch College, Baskin helped lead the creation of the Union for Research and Experimentation in Higher Education (what would later be named the Union for Experimenting Colleges and Universities, and subsequently Union Institute & University). As head of the Union for Experimenting Colleges and Universities, Baskin was the "driving force" behind the national initiative to create "University Without Walls" degree completion programs at 17 United States universities, including the University of Massachusetts, University of Minnesota, and Howard University.

Baskin left academia in the late 1970s to work as a consultant to the Ford Foundation. He was the recipient of the Distinguished Alumni Award from New York University. Baskin died in 2002 following a car accident.
