= Lisa Aronson Fontes =

Psychologist

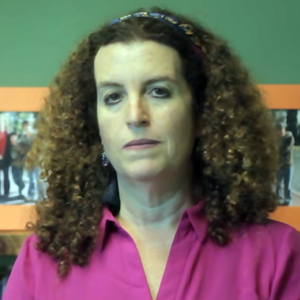
Fontes in 2015

Lisa Aronson Fontes is an American psychologist, author, activist and academic associated with the University of Massachusetts Amherst.

== Biography ==
Fontes was born in New York City. She graduated from the New Lincoln School and completed her undergraduate education in Romance Languages at Cornell University. In 2006 she was a Fulbright Scholar in Argentina. She also earned a master's degrees in journalism from Columbia University School of Journalism and a master's degree in psychology from New York University. She earned a PhD in counseling psychology from the University of Massachusetts Amherst in 1992. As of 2020, Fontes was a senior lecturer at the University of Massachusetts Amherst where she teaches in the University Without Walls program. An expert on sexual violence and coercive relationships, she is the author of four books and numerous scholarly journal articles on related subjects, blogs for Psychology Today, domesticshelters.org, and the Huffington Post, and consults to the U.S. Department of Justice's Office for Victims of Crime. She testifies in legal cases related to child abuse, sexual harassment, and intimate partner abuse.

Her books are Invisible Chains: Overcoming Coercive Control in Your Intimate Relationship; Interviewing Clients Across Cultures: A Practitioner's Guide; and Child Abuse and Culture: Working with Diverse Families, all published by Guilford Press. She edited the book, Sexual Abuse in Nine North American Cultures, published by Sage Press.

Fontes has three grown children and two grandchildren.
