= Ellen Jane Lorenz =

American composer (1907–1996)

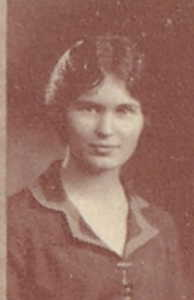
- Born: May 3, 1907; Dayton
- Died: December 31, 1996 (aged 90); Dayton
- Other names: Allen James; Rosemary Hadler; Peter Jerome
- Occupation: Composer
- Parent(s): Karl Kumler Lorenz; Caroline Boalt Lorenz

Ellen Jane Lorenz Porter (May 3, 1907 – December 31, 1996) was an American composer, music publisher, and authority on handbells. She was editor in chief of the Lorenz Publishing Company from 1940 to 1963.

== Early life and education ==
Ellen Jane Lorenz was born on May 3, 1907 in Dayton, Ohio, one of four children of Karl Kumler Lorenz, business manager of the sheet music publisher Lorenz Publishing Company, and Caroline Bloat Lorenz, composer and playwright. Karl Lorenz was the son of the founder of Lorenz, E.S. Lorenz. Lorenz began studying music at age eight.

She graduated from Wellesley College with a bachelor's degree in 1929, where she earned the Billings Prize for Musical Talent, and earned a master's degree from the University of Akron in 1931. She studied composition with Nadia Boulanger in Paris from 1931 to 1932.

Upon her retirement, she returned to school to get a masters from Wittenberg University and a Ph.D. from Union Graduate School; she was 71 years old when she earned her Ph.D. Her dissertation was on camp spirituals and was published as a book, Glory Hallelujah! The Story of the Campmeeting Spiritual, in 1980.

== Career ==
In 1932, she joined Lorenz Company, a publishing company founded by her family, where she would work as editor in chief from 1940 until 1963. Lorenz also composed music, which she did under multiple names including Allen James, Rosemary Hadler, and Peter Jerome. She also helped make handbells popular in choirs in the United States.

Ellen Jane Lorenz died on 31 December 1996 in Dayton.

== Honors and awards ==
In 1947 Lebanon Valley College awarded her with an honorary doctorate of music.

== Personal life ==
She married James B. Porter in 1938.
