= University Without Walls (University of Massachusetts Amherst) =

Degree completion program

- Established: 1971
- Parent institution: University of Massachusetts
- Location: Amherst, Massachusetts
- Website: www.umass.edu/uww

University Without Walls (UWW) at University of Massachusetts Amherst is a department within the university which provides degree completion coursework for the undergraduate and graduate degrees, enrolled by non-traditional students. The summer school semester and the winter semester is directly run by this department.

The department reports directly to Provost of the University of Massachusetts Amherst. Established in 1971, as of 2013 approximately five-percent of UMass graduates were receiving their undergraduate degrees through the program annually. Recently, Continuing and Professional Education (CPE) department with its degree completion programs at the undergraduate and graduate level was merged into University Without Walls department.

== History ==
The University of Massachusetts' University Without Walls was one of a number of similar programs founded at 17 American universities in 1971 with the help of a grant from the United States Office of Education (other participating institutions included the University of Minnesota, the University of South Carolina, and Howard University). Samuel Baskin was considered the "driving force" behind the nationwide initiative.

In 2010, Mark Cerasuolo became the first University of Massachusetts graduate from the University Without Walls program to deliver the University of Massachusetts' student commencement address.

As of 2013, an average of 250 students were annually receiving bachelor's degrees through the UMass University Without Walls program, out of approximately 5,000 total undergraduate degrees annually awarded by the University of Massachusetts. Between 1971 and 2015, the University of Massachusetts had awarded approximately 3,000 degrees to students through the UWW program. The program enrolls more students who are veterans of the U.S. armed forces than any other academic department at the University of Massachusetts.

== Structure ==
The UMass University Without Walls program only admits students who have already completed a minimum number of undergraduate university credits at the University of Massachusetts, or at another accredited institution, and have a minimum cumulative grade point average in those credits. Once enrolled, students are required to take four program-specific courses, plus additional classes equal to the difference between their accumulated university credits and the University of Massachusetts' 120-credit graduation requirement. Program-specific courses are taught by dedicated UMass University Without Walls faculty and deal with academic writing, critical thinking, research skills, and issues analysis. Students who require additional courses to meet the 120-credit requirement make up the deficit through standard University of Massachusetts classes taken from the school's other academic departments.

University Without Walls program functions as a regular academic department within the University of Massachusetts. UWW currently offers degree completion undergraduate and graduate programs from its on-campus departments. Additionally, UWW also offers its own Interdisciplinary Studies degree completion program in a wide range of academic areas through flexible options.

=== Social justice residency ===
Beginning in 2012, the UWW program began offering a "social justice residency," a one-credit, three-day, intensive course held at the University of Massachusetts' Springfield Center that teaches the "theory and practice of social justice activism, particularly as related to racial and economic inequality."

== Notable people ==
=== Alumni ===
- Nubar Alexanian - documentary photographer
- Julius Erving - NBA player
- Marcus Camby - NBA player
- Lari Ketner - basketball player
- Clare Higgins - mayor of Northampton, Massachusetts
- Bubba Pena - NFL player
- Lou Roe - NBA player
- Jeff Taylor - founder of monster.com
- Steve Turre - Jazz Trombonist
- Serena Williams - professional tennis player

=== Faculty ===
- Lawrence Hott
- Lisa Aronson Fontes
- Robert S. Welch
