= Clare Higgins (politician) =

American politician

Mayor of Northampton, Massachusetts
- In office January 1, 2000 – September 9, 2011
- Preceded by: Mary Ford
- Succeeded by: David Narkewicz

Member of Northampton City Council At-large
- In office January 1, 1993 – December 31, 1999

Personal details
- Born: Pittsburgh, Pennsylvania, U.S.
- Political party: Democratic
- Education: University Without Walls (University of Massachusetts Amherst)

Mary Clare Higgins is an American politician who was a six-term mayor of Northampton, Massachusetts, from 2000 to 2011. A Democrat, she was the second woman to hold the position. Higgins became the executive director of Community Action Pioneer Valley in September 2011.

== Education and background ==
Higgins was born in Pittsburgh, Pennsylvania, one of seven siblings. As an adolescent, she moved with her family to Brooklyn, New York, where her father was active in politics. She earned her bachelor's degree in 2003 through the University Without Walls (University of Massachusetts Amherst). Higgins worked in early childhood education.

== Career ==
Higgins became involved in politics in the early 1990s, when she became a commissioner on the board of the Northampton Housing Authority. During the same period, the city drew national media attention for its percentage of lesbians among the population.

Higgins was elected as an at-large City Councilor in 1993 and held the office until 1999; she served as president of the council for the last two years.

Higgins was elected to her first term as mayor in November 1999, assuming office in January 2000. She was the city's first openly lesbian mayor. Higgins resigned in September 2011 to become executive director of Community Action Pioneer Valley.

During her tenure, she was able to secure affordable housing for residents who were at risk of losing their homes due to condo conversion. The city's capital improvement fund for infrastructure was greatly expanded and used for a new water filtration plant, a senior center, a new police station, and new public works facility.

She is a member of the Mayors Against Illegal Guns Coalition, an organization formed in 2006 and co-chaired by New York City mayor Michael Bloomberg and Boston mayor Thomas Menino.

Higgins was recognized for her contributions by U.S. House of Representatives in 2012. She campaigned for Barack Obama during 2012 as part of the bus tour "Mayors for Obama". She became a monthly columnist for the Daily Hampshire Gazette.

== See also ==
- List of LGBT politicians in the United States
