= Godfrey John =

Christian Science practitioner and poet

Godfrey John, C.S.B., was a poet, writer, lecturer, and teacher.

== Biography ==
Godfrey John was born and grew up in Wales. He served in the Royal Air Force, and graduated from Cambridge University, where he was boxing team captain and a "light blue", and was a British amateur heavyweight boxing champion. For more than 40 years, poems and essays by John were published in the Christian Science Monitor.

Godfrey John moved to the United States in 1958, where he lived and worked and received a first award from the Academy of American Poets. He was a professor of English at several colleges in the United States, including Principia College, and later worked as an arts critic for the Christian Science Monitor. He became a public practitioner of Christian Science. In 1970, he moved to Canada, where he became a dual citizen (Canadian and British). In Canada, he also became a Christian Science teacher and served briefly on the Christian Science Board of Lectureship. For many years he was also active as a voluntary probation and parole officer. He had two children with his wife Rosalind, and lived in Toronto.

== Publications ==
Godfrey John was widely published in the Christian Science periodicals, including the Monitor, for over 40 years. He published a collection of poems and essays in the books Five Seasons (Foursquare Press, Cambridge, Massachusetts, 1977) and Compassion Wins (Thomson-Shore, Inc., Dexter, Michigan, 2001). The foreword of his first book was written by Henrietta Buckmaster, and the second by Rushworth Kidder. He is also published in a number of anthologies including Boundless Light: Poems of Healing.

Some of his poems are in the Welsh cywydd form.
