= Karen Schuster Webb =

American academic administrator

6th President of Union Institute & University
- In office July 1, 2018 – June 30, 2024

Personal details
- Born: Karen Schuster
- Children: 2
- Education: Indiana University Bloomington

Karen Schuster Webb is an American academic administrator who served as the sixth and final president of the Union Institute & University from 2018 until its closure in 2024. She was president of Antioch University Midwest from 2014 to 2016.

== Life ==
Webb was born to Corinne Perryman and Louis H. Schuster, II. She earned a B.A. in Spanish, a M.S. in education, and a Ph.D. in English education and second language studies from the Indiana University Bloomington. Webb's 1980 dissertation at the Indiana University School of Education was titled, A Study of Cognitive Processing Strategies for the Encoding of English Idioms into Long-Term Memory: A Study of Native, Advanced Nonnative, and Low Intermediate Nonnative Speakers of English. Harry L. Gradman was her doctoral advisor.

Webb worked at Howard University, Indiana University Bloomington, and Coppin State University. From 1992 to 1998, she was the program director for language education programs at the University of Kentucky. She cofounded and co-directed its center for the study of academy achievement in learning environments from 1994 to 1998. From 1998 to 2000, Webb was dean of the college of education at Southern University. Webb was an associate provost for community engagement and was the founding dean of the Shirley M. Hufstedler School of Education at the Alliant International University. In 2014, Webb became the fourth president of Antioch University Midwest and senior advisor for academic innovation do the chancellor of Antioch University. Her position as a campus president was terminated in 2016.

On July 1, 2018, Webb became the sixth president of the Union Institute & University. In October 2023, fifty doctoral students at Union signed a letter saying that she should resign as president “due to her creation of and subsequent failure to address the financial crisis, as well as her lack of transparency and empathy.” Facing serious financial challenges, Union closed permanently on June 30, 2024.

Webb married Wallace H. Webb, II. She has two children. She resided in Milford, Ohio before purchasing a home in Bloomington, Indiana in December 2022.
