= Will Franklin (basketball) =

American basketball player

Personal information
- Born: October 19, 1949 (age 77) Norfolk, Virginia, U.S.
- Listed height: 6 ft 7 in (2.01 m)
- Listed weight: 220 lb (100 kg)

Career information
- High school: Norfolk (Norfolk, Virginia)
- College: Purdue (1969–1972)
- NBA draft: 1972: 7th round, 110th overall pick
- Drafted by: Golden State Warriors
- Position: Power forward
- Number: 23

Career history
- 1972–1973: Virginia Squires
- 1974–1976: San Antonio Spurs
- Stats at Basketball Reference

William Thomas Franklin (born October 19, 1949) is an American former professional basketball power forward who spent three seasons in the American Basketball Association (ABA) as a member of the Virginia Squires (1972–73) and the San Antonio Spurs (1974–76).

Born in Norfolk, Virginia, he graduated from Purdue University where he played for George King, leading the Boilermakers to 3 consecutive Top 5 finishes in the Big Ten and a total record of 48–25 (overall) and 28–14 (conf). He twice averaged a 'double-double,' leading the Boilermakers to the 1971 NIT tourney. He finished his collegiate career with 851 points (#18 on the career list, today's #59) and 630 rebounds (#6 on the career list, today #18) He was a seventh round draft pick in the 1972 NBA draft by the Golden State Warriors; he was also drafted by his hometown Virginia Squires of the ABA.
