= Union Institute & University =

Private nonprofit university based in Ohio, U.S. (1964–2024)

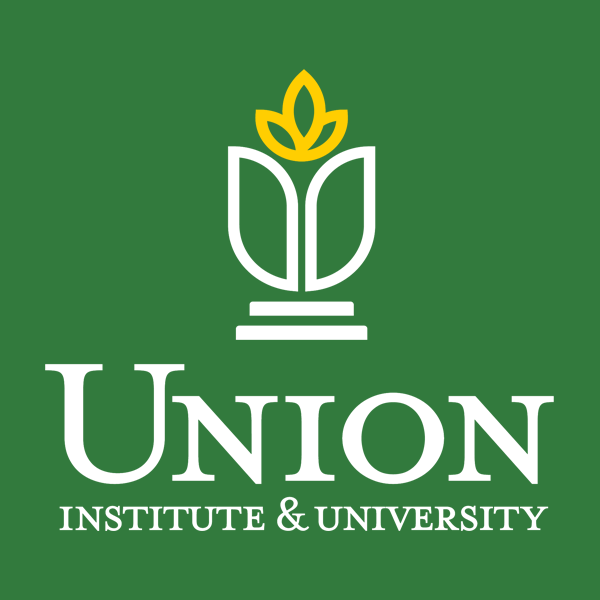
- Type: Private nonprofit online university
- Active: 1964–2024
- Location: California, Florida, and Ohio, United States
- Colors: Green; yellow
- Website: myunion.edu

Union Institute & University (UI&U) was a private nonprofit online university that was headquartered in Cincinnati, Ohio. In addition to being a pioneer in distance learning, it operated satellite campuses in California, Florida, and Ohio. It was founded in 1964 and closed in 2024.

== History ==
=== Creation and growth ===
Union Institute & University traced its origins to 1964, when the president of Goddard College hosted the presidents of nine liberal arts institutions at a conference to discuss cooperation in educational innovation and experimentation. The Union for Research and Experimentation in Higher Education was established by Antioch College, Bard College, Goddard College, Chicago Teachers North, Monteith Masson, New College at Hofstra University, Sarah Lawrence College, Shimer College, and Stephens College. The "discovery" of the English open education movement may have played a factor in the interest in progressive education.

Samuel Baskin, a psychologist and educational reformer who served on the faculty of Stephens and Antioch colleges, was the founding president of the Union for Experimenting Colleges and Universities, Union Graduate School, and the University Without Walls. Margaret Mead, an anthropologist and author, was one of the institution's first professors.

Renamed in 1969 as the Union for Experimenting Colleges and Universities, it focused on providing educational opportunities for non-traditional students whose needs were best served by a low-residency college experience, as well as those students who sought to conduct socially relevant research in an interdisciplinary manner.

The Union Graduate School's doctoral programs were based on the British tutorial system and the first doctoral students were admitted in 1970. From its inception, the institution had a continuing emphasis on social relevance and interdisciplinarity of research.

By 1971, five more colleges and universities joined the Union, bringing the total consortium to 22 schools of higher education. In 1975, the number of colleges in the University Without Walls network reached 34. In 1976, the offices moved from Yellow Springs, Ohio, where Antioch College was located to Cincinnati.

The Union of Experimenting Colleges and Universities, or UECU, disbanded in 1982, but the University Without Walls remained in operation after a Chapter 11 bankruptcy in 1984. In 1989, the University Without Walls was renamed The Union Institute.

=== Vermont College acquisition and spin-off ===
The Union Institute acquired Vermont College in Montpelier, Vermont, from Norwich University in 2001. The purchase of Vermont College added several master's degree programs and an adult degree program to the Union's existing undergraduate and doctoral programs. This enabled The Union to provide a progression of degree opportunities, along with certificates in advanced graduate study. In October 2001, the Union Institute was renamed and adopted its final name Union Institute & University. In 2008, fine arts programs from Vermont College were spun off from Union into the newly independent Vermont College of Fine Arts.

=== Early 2000s academic issues ===
Union Institute & University's PhD program came under scrutiny by the Ohio Board of Regents, culminating in a reauthorization report published in 2002. In response to the report, Union underwent major academic and structural changes, including dissolution of the Union Graduate School and restructuring of its PhD programs. The PhD in Arts and Sciences was redesigned as a PhD in Interdisciplinary Studies, with four majors: Ethical and Creative Leadership, Public Policy and Social Change, Humanities and Culture, and Educational Studies, and offers a specialization in Dr. Martin Luther King Jr. Studies. In 2004 the U.S. Department of Education also raised concerns about the quality of the institute's PhD programs.

=== 2023 financial distress ===
Union Institute began to publicly experience severe financial distress in March 2023 when salaries owed to university staff were paid late.

Throughout 2023, the university continued to exhibit signs of financial distress including further delayed wages and being locked out of its headquarters. Some university staff filed a class action lawsuit against the university alleging that the delayed wages violate labor laws. The lawsuit was settled in March 2024 for $110,000.

The start of the fall 2023 semester was delayed from August to November, and then cancelled completely on November 15. In October, fifty doctoral students at Union signed a letter saying that the president of Union, Karen Schuster Webb, "should resign" and that the entire board of trustees should be replaced.

Union was also placed on heightened cash monitoring 2 by the U.S. Department of Education, a status that imposes oversight over its federal financial aid. In late November, they revoked Union's ability to receive federal financial aid and also fined the university $4.3 million, alleging that Union collected more federal funding that it was supposed to collect and failed to refund the federal government. In addition, the Education Department reported that the Institute had failed to refund more than $750,000 in student financial aid that had been required.

As a consequence of being placed on heightened cash monitoring status, the Higher Learning Commission, Union's accreditor, "assigned a Financial Distress designation to Union."

In December 2023, a teach-out plan was announced between Union and Antioch University for two master's degree programs and a doctoral program. An additional teach-out plan was signed with Lasell University in Massachusetts.

=== Closure ===
In May 2024, the institute was placed on "Administrative Probation" by the Higher Learning Commission for failure to pay annual dues to the accrediting body. Shortly thereafter, Union's leaders announced that the institution would resign its accreditation effective June 25, 2024 and close entirely on June 30.

Despite its June 30, 2024, closure, Union Institute is still attempting to collect past due tuition payments and withholding transcripts of students who refuse to pay.

In November 2024, former students reported that months after the closure they were still unable to get transcripts from the shuttered institution.

In April 2025, Union Institute filed for Chapter 7 bankruptcy, citing liabilities of more than $28 million and assets of less than $200,000.

== Locations ==
Originally, instruction was provided as a low-residency model at the constituent colleges of the organization.

In 1996, the college acquired two buildings in Cincinnati, Time Hill and the Procter and Collier–Beau Brummell Building. It sold Time Hill in 2008 to Lighthouse Youth Services and the Procter and Collier-Beau Brummell Building to the University of Cincinnati in 2021 and released its satellite campuses in California and Florida.

In 2021, it moved into a rented building at 2090 Florence Avenue in Walnut Hills, Cincinnati to serve as its headquarters, which by July 2023, the university was behind on rent "to the tune of more than $367,000." In August 2023, the university was locked out of its Cincinnati headquarters and was evicted on November 9, 2023.

== Presidents ==
1. Samuel Baskin (1965–1976)
2. King Virgil Cheek (1976–1978)
3. Kenneth W. Rothe (1978)
4. Robert Conley (1982–1999)
5. Judith Sturnick (2000–2003)
6. Roger H. Sublett (2003–2018)
7. Karen Schuster Webb (2018–2024)

== Notable alumni ==
- Stanley Aronowitz (PhD 1975), trade-unionist, social critic, and scholar
- E. M. Broner, novelist, professor and feminist. Author of A Weave of Women and Her Mothers. Taught for Wayne State University and Sarah Lawrence College
- Brother Blue, street performance artist, and instructor
- Rita Mae Brown (PhD 1976), poet and author of Rubyfruit Jungle
- Joseph Bruchac, writer, educator, and storyteller; Lifetime Achievement Award from the Native Writers' Circle of the Americas
- Danny K. Davis, congressman, Illinois 7th District
- Gary Dorrien, Reinhold Niebuhr Professor of Social Ethics, Union Theological Seminary, New York
- Lez Edmond, civil rights activist, author, and professor at St. John's University
- Clarissa Pinkola Estés, Jungian analyst and author of Women Who Run With The Wolves
- Joan Halifax, Zen Buddhist teacher, activist, and author. Founder and abbot of Upaya Zen Center
- Gerald Haslam, author, Workin' Man Blues, Straight White Male, Coming of Age in California
- Carl Hausman, professor of journalism at Rowan University
- Jean Houston, author and lecturer, co-founder of the Foundation for Mind Research
- Barnet Kellman, theater, film and television director
- Michael T. Klare, professor of Peace and World Security Studies, Hampshire College
- Bernie Krause, bioacoustics authority
- Elizabeth Kapuʻuwailani Lindsey, actor, filmmaker, and anthropologist
- Aurora Levins Morales, Puerto Rican writer and poet
- Phillip Lopate, film critic, essayist, fiction writer, and poet
- James P. Lyke, Roman Catholic prelate; auxiliary bishop of Cleveland (1978–1990) and archbishop of Atlanta (1991–92)
- Karyl McBride, psychotherapist and author
- Portia Simpson-Miller, first female Prime Minister of Jamaica, 2006–2007, 2012–2016
- Scott Douglas Miller, President of Virginia Wesleyan University, former president of Bethany College, Wesley College, Lincoln Memorial University
- Gary Null, radio personality, alternative medicine practitioner, nutritionist, and HIV-AIDS denialist
- Antonia Pantoja, educator, social worker, civil rights leader, and founder of ASPIRA, Boricua College, and Producer
- Ellen Jane Lorenz Porter, composer and editor
- Lincoln Ragsdale, member of the Tuskegee Airmen and real estate developer
- Jane O'Meara Driscoll Sanders, Interim President of Goddard College, (1996–97) president of Burlington College (2004–2011)
- Éléonore Sioui, Wyandot teacher and activist and first Indigenous woman in Canada to earn a PhD
- James Turner, founding Director of Cornell University's Africana Studies and Research Center
- Clayton Valli, poet and linguist

== Sources ==
- Barrett, Laurence; Bare, John K.; Hays, William L.; et al. (May 1972). Report of a Visit to the University Without Walls by the Union for Experimenting Colleges and Universities Yellow Springs, Ohio, May, 1972 for the Commission on Institutions of Higher Education of the North Central Association of Colleges and Secondary Schools (Report). ERIC ED083909.
