= Daphne Valerius =

American film producer

- Born: Brooklyn, New York
- Occupation: Filmmaker
- Years active: 2006–present

Daphne Valerius is a filmmaker born in Brooklyn, New York and raised in Rhode Island. She is best known for producing the 2007 documentary film The Souls of Black Girls. Valerius has also produced television work for ABC, FOX and BET.

== Education ==
Valerius attended St. John's University and earned a bachelor's degree in communications in 2003. While a student there, she had her first experiences producing and directing and began to become interested in media images and their effect on women of color. As a Ronald McNair Scholar, Valerius did her undergraduate research on self-esteem and self-confidence.

Valerius continued this research while earning her master's in broadcast journalism from Emerson College, completing that degree in 2006. For her work, she received an Associated Press Award for Public Affairs. Valerius earned her PhD at the University of Missouri-Columbia in Mediated Communication in 2021. As a media scholar, Dr. Valerius' research involves taking qualitative approaches to critically examining media messages (e.g., film and digital productions) to address the role of media in shaping and influencing the prejudice and social stigma of marginalized groups. An example of this research is demonstrated in her dissertation, "Do Black Men Really Love Black Women?". This research involved examining stereotypical media depictions of Black women and conducting focus groups with Black men to better understand how media representations shape and inform perceptions of suitable partners for long-term romantic relationships. This research centers the voice of Black men and suggests that media intersect with personal experiences in a complex way that inform how we see each other. At the heart of Dr. Valerius's scholarship is an understanding that media representation matters.

== Work ==
=== The Souls of Black Girls ===
As part of her journalism program at Emerson, Valerius produced a news documentary titled The Souls of Black Girls. With very limited budget, Valerius borrowed all needed camera, lighting, and editing equipment from the college. The film looked at historical and modern representations of women of color and the beauty standards therein. It included interviews about body image with young women as well as with prominent African-Americans including Regina King, Jada Pinkett Smith, Gwen Ifill, Chuck D, Michaela Angela Davis and Juanita Jennings.

The film's name references the W. E. B. Du Bois book The Souls of Black Folk. Of the film, Valerius has said, "I think this piece resonates across race and gender because it is a piece that is the voice of the victim and not the voice of the victimizer or spokesman, it's our hurts, our pains, our insecurities, our story that no one else can tell but us."

The film was well-received, premiering at the 2007 Pan African Film Festival and screening at festivals including the Roxbury Film Festival, the Harlem International Film Festival, and the Martha's Vineyard African American Film Festival, where it was earned the Audience Choice Award for Best Documentary. It was also shown on AOL Black Voices.

After being screened at the National Council of Negro Women and catching the attention of activist Dorothy Height, the film became a large part of the "My Black is Beautiful" tour sponsored by Procter & Gamble.

=== Television ===
In 2010, Valerius was an associate producer on My Black is Beautiful for BET. She has also worked as associate producer or researcher for projects for MGM Television and ABC Television Group.

== Recognition ==
In 2010 Valerius was invited to the White House by First Lady Michelle Obama, who congratulated her on her work.

Valerius has been invited to participate in several panels about the social issues facing women, including a panel at the National Council of Negro Women's gathering in 2008 and a panel at the Congressional Black Caucus Foundation's Annual Leadership Conference in 2016.

In 2007 Valerius was initiated into Alpha Kappa Alpha sorority at Theta Psi Omega chapter in Providence, RI.
