= Rushworth Kidder =

American author, ethicist, and professor

Rushworth Moulton Kidder (May 8, 1944 – March 5, 2012) was an American author, ethicist, and professor. Kidder founded the Institute for Global Ethics in 1990, and is the author of Moral Courage and How Good People Make Tough Choices: Resolving the Dilemmas of Ethical Living. He was born in Amherst, Massachusetts. He worked as a columnist and editor for The Christian Science Monitor. Kidder died in 2012 of natural causes in Naples, Florida at the age of 67. Kidder earned a doctorate from Columbia University in English and comparative literature and wrote the foreword to Compassion Wins, by Godfrey John. He wrote an award-winning five-part series on quantum physics in 1988, and his writings appeared in the American Society of Newspaper Editors' Best Newspaper Writing collection.

== Selected bibliography ==
- Good Kids, Tough Choices: How Parents Can Help Their Children Do the Right Thing (2010), ISBN 978-0-470-54762-5
- The Ethics Recession: Reflections on the Moral Underpinnings of the Current Economic Crisis (2009), ISBN 0-615-27535-4
- Moral Courage (2005), ISBN 0-06-059154-4
- How Good People Make Tough Choices: Resolving the Dilemmas of Ethical Living (1995), ISBN 0-688-13442-4
- Shared Values for a Troubled World: Conversations With Men and Women of Conscience (1994), ISBN 1-55542-603-4
- "Heartland Ethics: Voices from the American Midwest" editor (1992), ISBN 1-881601-00-5
- "In the Backyards of Our Lives" (1992), ISBN 978-0-89909-343-7
- Reinventing the Future: Global Goals for the 21st Century (1989), ISBN 0-262-11146-2
