= Julius Erving =

American former basketball player (born 1950)

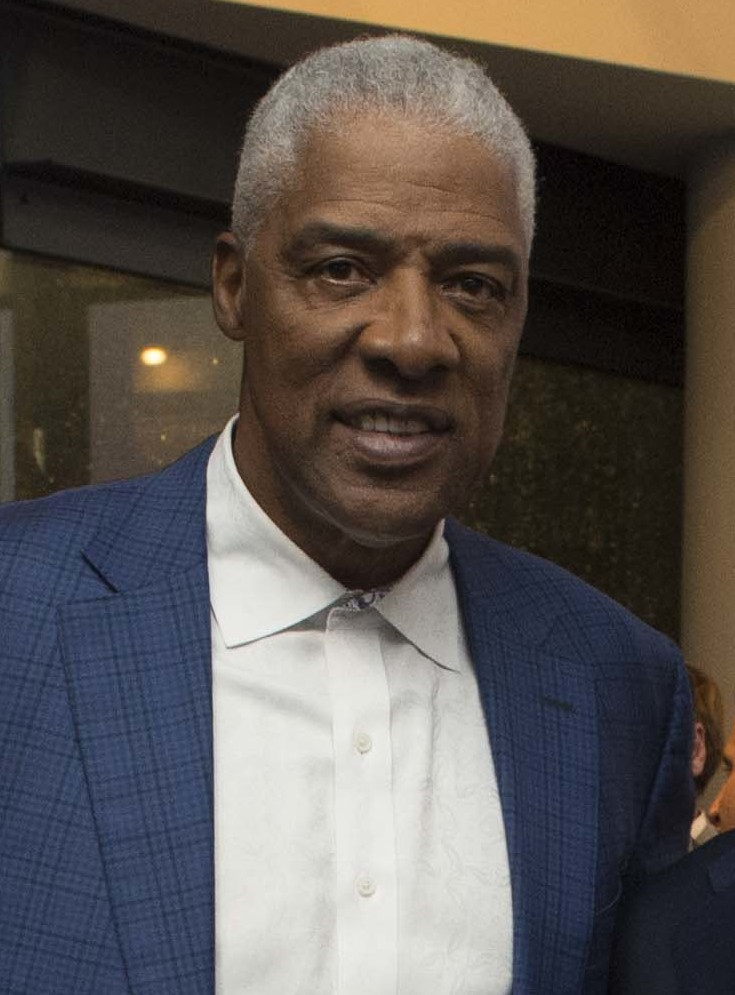
- Erving in 2016

Personal information
- Born: February 22, 1950 (age 76) East Meadow, New York, U.S.
- Listed height: 6 ft 7 in (2.01 m)
- Listed weight: 210 lb (95 kg)

Career information
- High school: Roosevelt (Roosevelt, New York)
- College: UMass (1969–1971)
- NBA draft: 1972: 1st round, 12th overall pick
- Drafted by: Milwaukee Bucks
- Playing career: 1971–1987
- Position: Small forward
- Number: 32, 6

Career history
- 1971–1973: Virginia Squires
- 1973–1976: New York Nets
- 1976–1987: Philadelphia 76ers

Career highlights
- NBA champion (1983); 2× ABA champion (1974, 1976); 2× ABA Playoffs MVP (1974, 1976); NBA Most Valuable Player (1981); 3× ABA Most Valuable Player (1974–1976); 11× NBA All-Star (1977–1987); 5× ABA All-Star (1972–1976); 2× NBA All-Star Game MVP (1977, 1983); 5× All-NBA First Team (1978, 1980–1983); 2× All-NBA Second Team (1977, 1984); 4× All-ABA First Team (1973–1976); All-ABA Second Team (1972); ABA All-Defensive First Team (1976); ABA All-Rookie First Team (1972); 3× ABA scoring champion (1973, 1974, 1976); ABA Slam Dunk champion (1976); ABA All-Time Team; ABA All-time MVP; NBA anniversary team (35th, 50th, 75th); No. 32 retired by Brooklyn Nets; No. 6 retired by Philadelphia 76ers; Third-team All-American – NABC, UPI (1971); No. 32 retired by UMass Minutemen

Career ABA and NBA statistics
- Points: 30,026 (24.2 ppg)
- Rebounds: 10,525 (8.5 rpg)
- Assists: 5,176 (4.2 apg)
- Stats at NBA.com
- Stats at Basketball Reference
- Basketball Hall of Fame
- Collegiate Basketball Hall of Fame

Julius Winfield Erving II (born February 22, 1950), commonly known by the nickname "Dr. J", is an American former professional basketball player. He helped legitimize the American Basketball Association (ABA), and was the best-known player in the league when it merged into the National Basketball Association (NBA) after the 1975–1976 season.

Erving won three championships, four Most Valuable Player awards and three scoring titles with the ABA's Virginia Squires and New York Nets (now the NBA's Brooklyn Nets) and the NBA's Philadelphia 76ers. During his 16 seasons as a player, none of his teams ever missed the postseason. He is the ninth-highest scorer in ABA/NBA history with 30,026 points (NBA and ABA combined). He was well known for slam dunking from the free-throw line in Slam Dunk Contests and was the only player voted Most Valuable Player in both the ABA and the NBA. The basketball slang of being posterized was coined to describe his moves. In 1980, Erving was honored as one of the league's greatest players of all time by being named to the NBA 35th Anniversary Team. In 1993, Erving was inducted into the Basketball Hall of Fame. In 1994, Erving was named by Sports Illustrated as one of the 40 most important athletes of all time. In 2004, he was inducted into the Nassau County Sports Hall of Fame. In both 1996 and 2021, Erving was again honored as one of the league's greatest players of all time by being named to the NBA's 50th and 75th anniversary teams, respectively.

Many consider him one of the most talented players in the history of the NBA; he is widely acknowledged as one of the game's best dunkers. While Connie Hawkins, "Jumping" Johnny Green, Elgin Baylor, Jim Pollard and Gus Johnson performed spectacular dunks before Erving's time, Erving brought the practice into the mainstream. His signature was the slam dunk, since incorporated into the vernacular and basic skill set of the game in the same manner as the crossover dribble and the no-look pass. Before Erving, dunking was a practice most commonly used by the big men, usually standing close to the hoop, to show their brutal strength which was seen as style over substance, even unsportsmanlike, by many purists of the game; however, the way Erving utilized the dunk more as a high-percentage shot made at the end of maneuvers generally starting well away from the basket and not necessarily a show of force helped to make the shot an acceptable tactic, especially in trying to avoid a blocked shot. Although the slam dunk is still widely used as a show of power, a method of intimidation and a way to fire up a team and spectators, Erving demonstrated that there can be great artistry and grace in slamming the ball into the hoop, particularly after a launch several feet from that target.

== Early life ==
Erving was born February 22, 1950, at Meadowbrook Hospital, East Meadow, on Long Island, and raised from the age of 13 in Roosevelt, New York. Prior to that, he lived in nearby Hempstead. He attended Roosevelt High School and played for its basketball team. He received the nickname "Doctor" or "Dr. J" from a high school friend named Leon Saunders. He explains: "I started calling [Saunders] 'the professor' and he started calling me 'the doctor'. So it was just between us...we were buddies, we had our nicknames and we would roll with the nicknames. ... And that's where it came from."

Erving recalled that "later on, in the Rucker Park league in Harlem, when people started calling me 'Black Moses' and 'Houdini', I told them if they wanted to call me anything, call me 'Doctor'". Over time, the nickname evolved into "Dr. Julius" and finally "Dr. J." Erving was first called "Dr. J" by his friend and future teammate on the Nets and Squires, Willie Sojourner.

== College career and Team USA ==
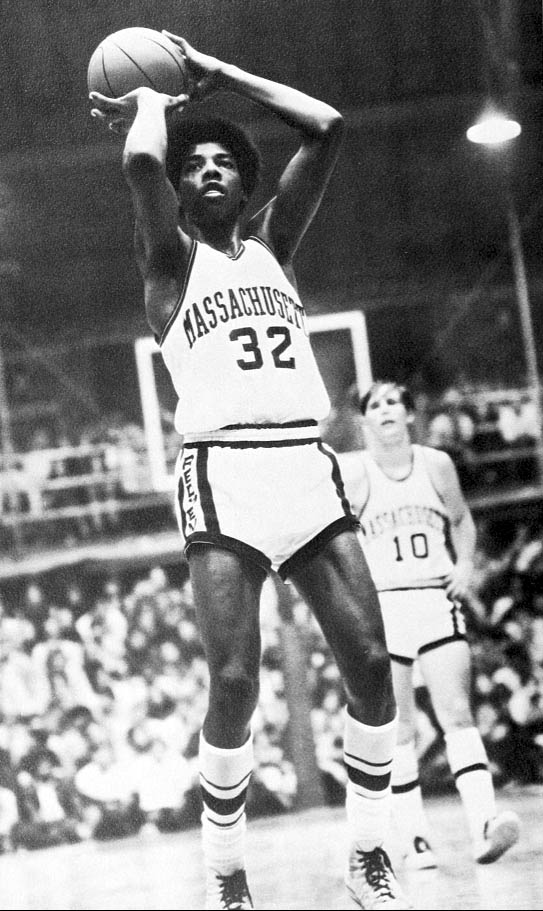
Erving at UMass, c. 1970–71

Erving enrolled at the University of Massachusetts Amherst in 1968. In two varsity college basketball seasons, he averaged 26.3 points and 20.2 rebounds per game, becoming one of only six players to average more than 20 points and 20 rebounds per game in NCAA Men's Basketball. In 1968, the NCAA adopted a rule that prohibited dunking. Thus, Erving's dunking was only seen and known to teammates at practice.

Fifteen years later, Erving fulfilled a promise he had made to his mother by earning a bachelor's degree in creative leadership and administration from the school through the University Without Walls program. Erving also holds an honorary doctorate from UMass. In September 2021, Massachusetts honored Erving by unveiling a statue outside the Mullins Center on the university's campus.

In the year 1970, Erving also played for the United States Olympic Development Team as an aim to qualify for the Olympic team in the 1972 Summer Olympics in Munich, Germany. Erving, wearing the jersey number six, played power forward and was recruited to be the team's top rebounder. He ended up being the top vote-getter for Most Valuable Player or MVP, a top scorer for Team USA, and successfully competed against adult professional players from the Soviet Union, Finland, and other European countries alongside teammates Bob Nash and Paul Westphal. It was around this time Erving started hearing talks among his teammates of the American Basketball Association (ABA) and its novel goal to recruit undergraduates as a plan to compete with the National Basketball Association. After a meeting with ABA general manager Johnny "Red" Kerr and future coach Al Bianchi, he then decided to inform his mother that he will join the ABA in late 1971 while staying in a hotel in Philadelphia talking with a double agent named Steve Arnold. This became a subject of litigation for Erving's NBA rights to play for the Atlanta Hawks in the next year.

== Professional career ==
=== Virginia Squires (1971–1973) ===
Although NBA rules at the time did not allow teams to draft players who were fewer than four years removed from high school, the ABA instituted a "hardship" rule that would allow players to leave college early. Erving took advantage of the rule change and left Massachusetts after his junior year to sign a four-year contract worth $500,000 spread over seven years with the Virginia Squires. However, the Squires were forced to forfeit their first-round pick in the 1972 ABA draft in order for the ABA to allow this move on their end, later being one of four ABA teams to relinquish their first-round draft pick rights during that year's draft period.

Erving quickly established himself as a force and gained a reputation for hard and ruthless dunking. He scored 27.3 points per game as a rookie, was selected to the All-ABA Second Team, made the ABA All-Rookie Team, led the ABA in offensive rebounds and finished second to Artis Gilmore for the ABA Rookie of the Year Award. He led the Squires into the Eastern Division Finals, where they lost to the Rick Barry-led New York Nets in seven games. The Nets went to the finals, losing to the star-studded Indiana Pacers team.

=== ABA–NBA contract dispute ===
Under NBA rules, he became eligible for the 1972 NBA draft and the Milwaukee Bucks picked him in the first round (12th overall), a move that would have brought him together with Oscar Robertson and Kareem Abdul-Jabbar. Prior to the draft, he signed a contract with the Atlanta Hawks worth more than $1 million with a $250,000 bonus. The signing with the Hawks came after a dispute with the Squires where he demanded a renegotiation of the terms. He discovered that his agent at the time, Steve Arnold, was employed by the Squires and convinced him to sign a below-market contract.

This created a dispute among three teams in two leagues. The Bucks asserted their rights to Erving via the draft, while the Squires went to court to force him to honor his contract. He joined Pete Maravich at the Hawks' training camp, as they prepared for the upcoming season. He played two exhibition games with the Hawks until NBA Commissioner J. Walter Kennedy ruled that the Bucks owned Erving's rights via the draft. Kennedy fined the Hawks $25,000 per game in violation of his ruling. Atlanta appealed Kennedy's decision to the league owners, who also supported the Bucks' position. While waiting for the owners' decision, Erving played in one more preseason game, earning the Hawks another fine. Erving enjoyed his brief time with Atlanta and he would later duplicate with George Gervin his after-practice playing with Maravich.

On October 2, Judge Edward Neaher issued an injunction that prohibited him from playing for any team other than the Squires. The judge then sent the case to arbitration because of an arbitration clause in Erving's contract with Virginia. He agreed to report to the Squires while his appeal of the injunction made its way through the court.

Back in the ABA, his game flourished and he achieved a career-best 31.9 points per game in the 1972–1973 season. The following year, the cash-strapped Squires sold his contract to the New York Nets.

=== New York Nets (1973–1976) ===
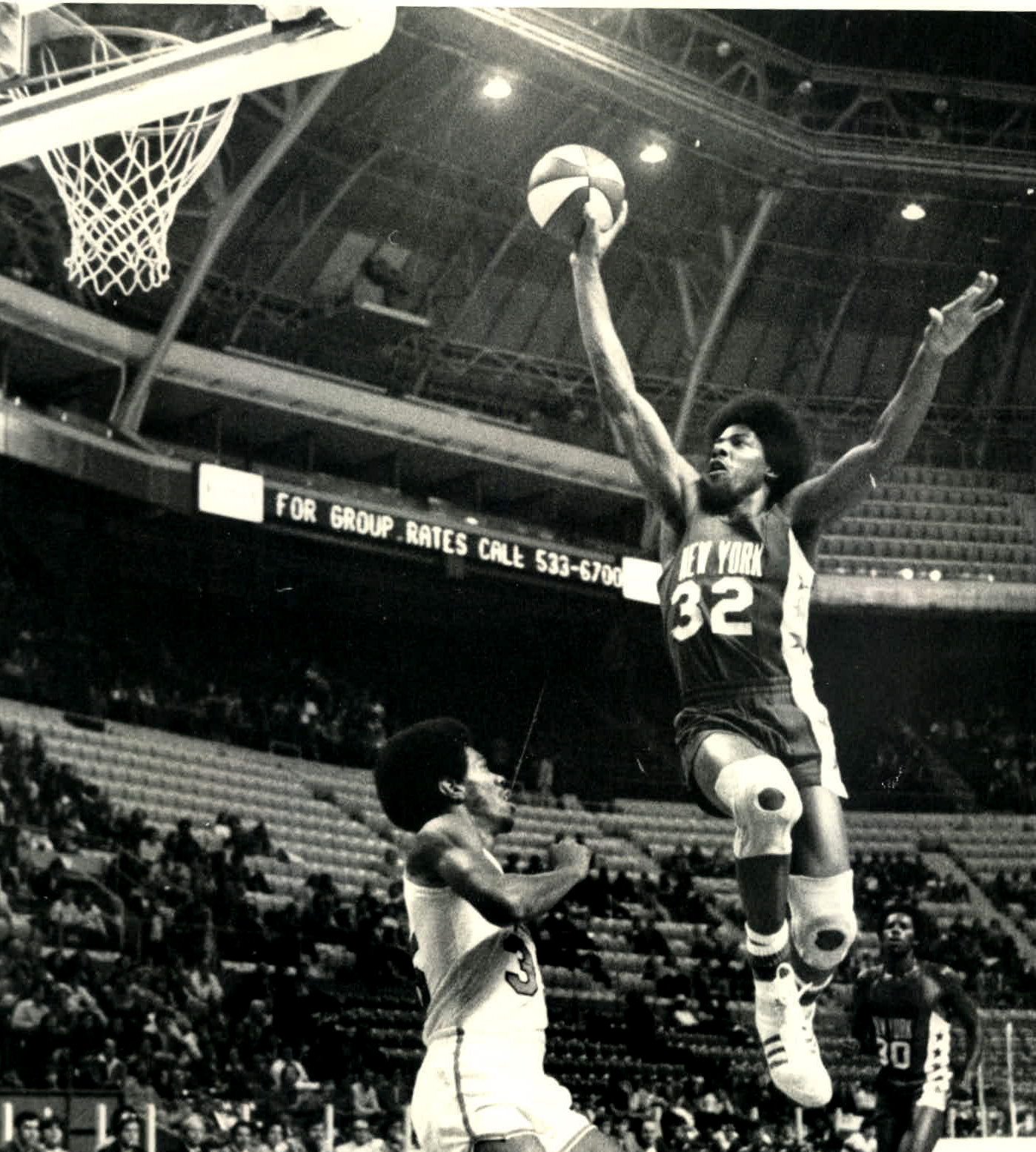
Erving in 1974

The Squires, like most ABA teams, were on rather shaky financial ground. The cash-strapped team sent Erving to the Nets in a complex deal that kept him in the ABA. Erving signed an eight-year deal worth a reported $350,000 per year. The Squires received $750,000, George Carter and the rights to Kermit Washington for Erving and Willie Sojourner. The Nets also sent $425,000 to the Hawks to reimburse the team for its legal fees, fines and the bonus paid to Erving. Finally, Atlanta would receive draft compensation should a merger of the league result in a common draft.

Erving went on to lead the Nets to their first ABA title in 1973–1974, defeating the Utah Stars. Erving established himself as the most important player in the ABA. His spectacular play established the Nets as one of the better teams in the ABA and brought fans and credibility to the league. The end of the 1975–76 ABA season finally brought the ABA–NBA merger. The Nets and Nuggets had applied for admission to the NBA before the season, in anticipation of the eventual merger that had first been proposed by the two leagues in 1970 but which was delayed for various reasons, including the Oscar Robertson free agency suit (which was not resolved until 1976). The Erving-led Nets defeated the Denver Nuggets in the ABA's final championship. In the postseason, Erving averaged 34.7 points and was named Most Valuable Player of the playoffs. That season, he finished in the top 10 in the ABA in points per game, rebounds per game, assists per game, steals per game, blocks per game, free throw percentage, free throws made, free throws attempted, three-point field goal percentage and three-point field goals made. This is the only season in the ABA or the NBA where such a feat was accomplished.

=== Philadelphia 76ers (1976–1987) ===
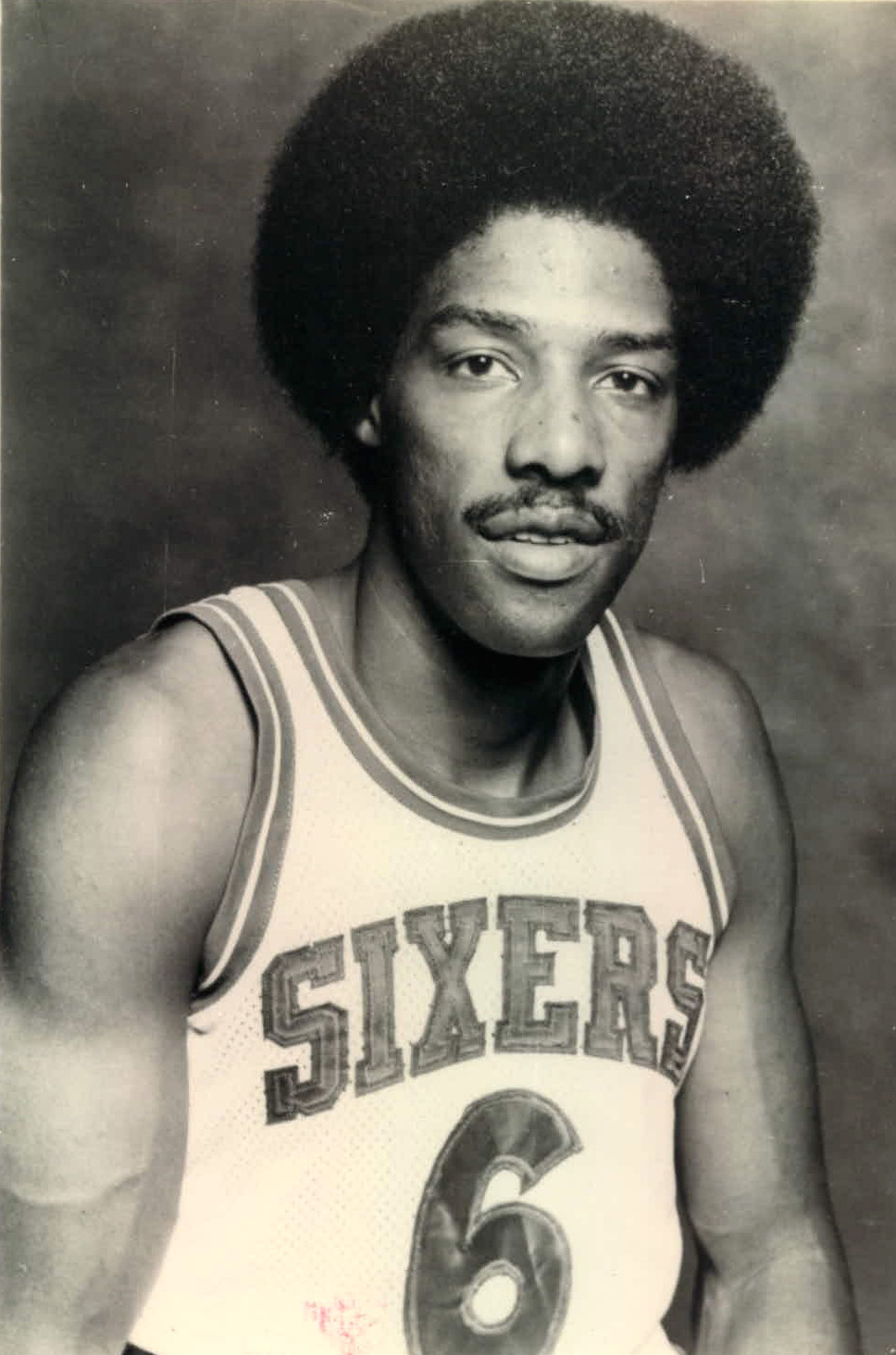
Erving in 1976

The Nets, Nuggets, Indiana Pacers and San Antonio Spurs joined the NBA for the 1976–1977 season. With Erving and Nate Archibald (acquired in a trade with Kansas City), the Nets were poised to pick up right where they left off. However, the New York Knicks upset the Nets' plans when they demanded that the Nets pay them $4.8 million for "invading" the Knicks' NBA territory. Coming on the heels of the fees the Nets had to pay for joining the NBA, owner Roy Boe reneged on a promise to raise Erving's salary. Erving refused to play under these conditions and held out in training camp.

After several teams such as the Milwaukee Bucks, Los Angeles Lakers and Philadelphia 76ers lobbied to obtain him, the Nets offered Erving's contract to the Knicks in return for waiving the indemnity, but the Knicks turned it down. This was considered one of the worst decisions in franchise history. The Sixers then decided to offer to buy Erving's contract for $3 million—roughly the same amount as the Nets' expansion fee—and Boe had little choice but to accept the deal. For all intents and purposes, the Nets traded their franchise player for a berth in the NBA. The Erving deal left the Nets in ruin; they promptly crashed to a 22–60 record, the worst in the league. Years later, Boe regretted having to trade Erving to join the NBA, saying, "The merger agreement killed the Nets as an NBA franchise."

Erving requested the No. 32 jersey that he had worn in the ABA, but was informed that it was to be retired for Billy Cunningham. He then decided to wear No. 6 instead in honor of Bill Russell, who had been one of his heroes growing up. Erving quickly became the leader of his new club and led them to an exciting 50-win season. However, playing with other stars-such as former ABA standout George McGinnis, future NBA All-Star Lloyd Free and aggressive Doug Collins allowed him to focus on playing more team-oriented ball. Despite a smaller role, Erving stayed unselfish. The Sixers won the Atlantic Division and were the top drawing team in the NBA. They defeated the defending champions, the Boston Celtics, to win the Eastern Conference. Erving took them into the NBA Finals against the Portland Trail Blazers of Bill Walton. After the Sixers took a 2–0 lead, however, the Blazers ran off four straight victories after the famous brawl between Maurice Lucas and Darryl Dawkins which ignited the Blazers' team.

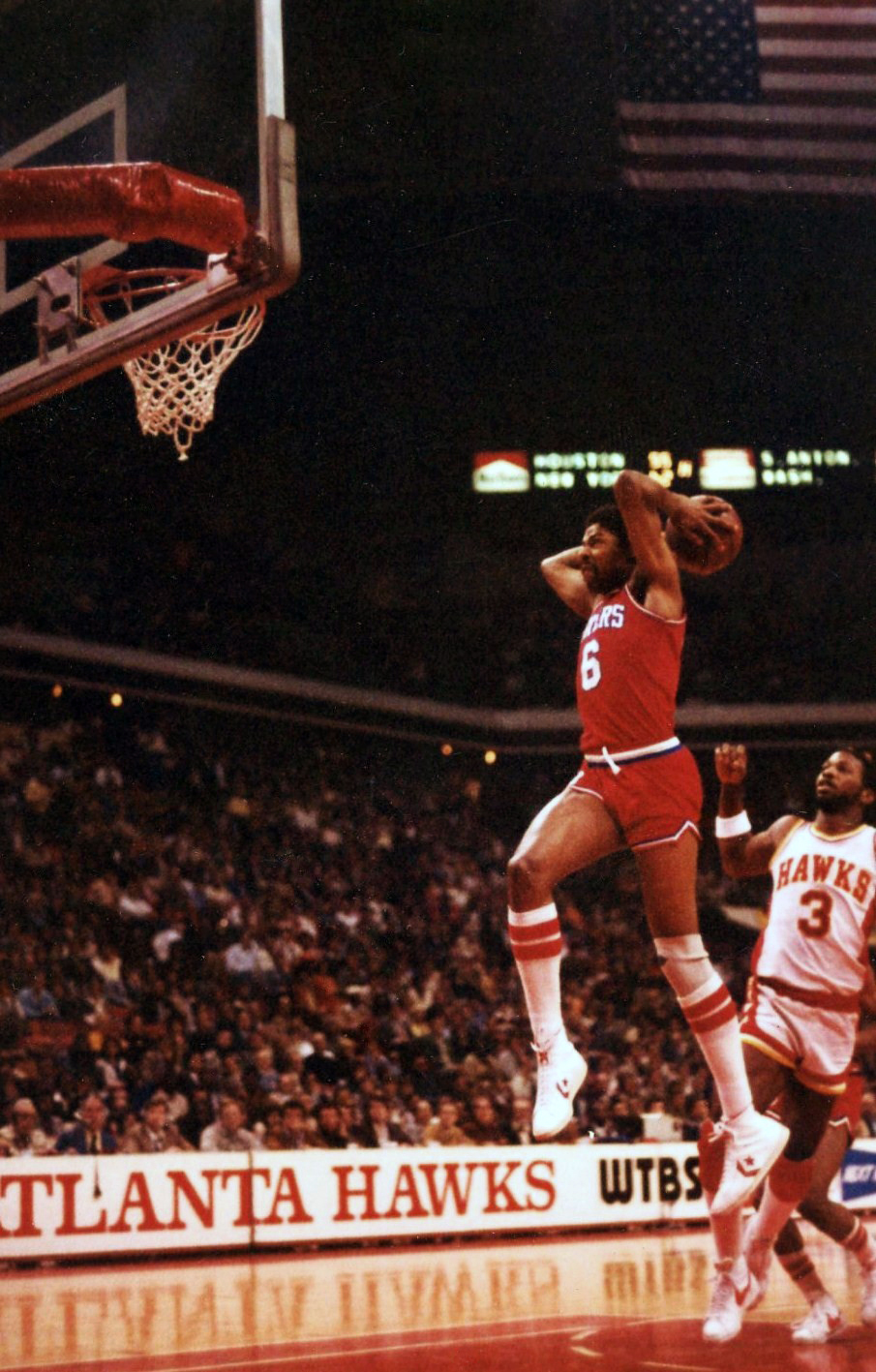
Erving playing against the Atlanta Hawks in 1981

Erving enjoyed success off the court, becoming one of the first basketball players to endorse many products and to have a shoe marketed under his name. He also starred in the 1979 basketball comedy film, The Fish That Saved Pittsburgh. In the following years, Erving coped with a team that was not yet playing at his level. It took a few years for the Sixers franchise to build around Erving. Eventually, coach Billy Cunningham and top-level players like Maurice Cheeks, Andrew Toney, and Bobby Jones were added to the mix and the franchise was very successful.

The Sixers were still eliminated twice in the Eastern Conference Finals. In 1979, Larry Bird entered the league, reviving the Boston Celtics and the storied Celtics–76ers rivalry; these two teams faced each other in the Eastern Conference Finals in 1980, 1981, 1982 and 1985. The Bird vs. Erving matchup became arguably the top personal rivalry in the sport (along with Bird vs. Magic Johnson), inspiring the early Electronic Arts video game One on One: Dr. J vs. Larry Bird. In 1980, the 76ers prevailed over the Celtics to advance to the NBA Finals against the Los Angeles Lakers. There, Erving executed the legendary "Baseline Move", a behind-the-board reverse layup. However, the Lakers won the series 4–2 with superb play from, among others, Magic Johnson. Erving also made the only three-point shot in that NBA Finals series, which was the first time the three-point line was introduced in the league.

Erving was again among the league's best players in the 1980–1981 and 1981–1982 seasons, although more disappointment came as the Sixers stumbled twice in the playoffs: in 1981, the Celtics eliminated them in seven games in the 1981 Eastern Finals after Philadelphia had a 3–1 series lead, but lost both Game 5 and Game 6 by 2 points and the deciding Game 7 by 1; and in 1982, the Sixers managed to beat the defending champion Celtics in seven games in the 1982 Eastern Finals but lost the NBA Finals to the Los Angeles Lakers in six games. Despite these defeats, Erving was named the NBA MVP in 1981 and was again voted to the 1982 All-NBA First Team.

For the 1982–1983 season, the Sixers obtained the missing element to combat their weakness at their center position, Moses Malone. Armed with a highly regarded center-forward combination, the Sixers dominated the whole season, prompting Malone to make the famous playoff prediction of "fo-fo-fo (four-four-four)" in anticipation of the 76ers sweeping the three rounds of the playoffs en route to an NBA title. In fact, the Sixers went four-five-four, losing one game to the Milwaukee Bucks in the conference finals, then sweeping the Lakers to win the NBA title.

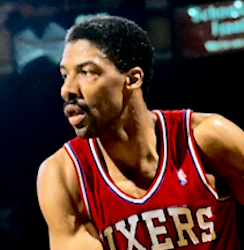
Erving during his final season in 1987

Erving maintained his all-star caliber of play into his twilight years, averaging 22.4, 20.0, 18.1 and 16.8 points per game in his final seasons. In 1986, he announced that he would retire after the season. That final season saw opposing teams pay tribute to Erving in the last game he would play in their arenas, including in cities such as Boston and Los Angeles, his perennial rivals in the playoffs. On April 17, 1987, against the Indiana Pacers, Erving scored a season-high 38 points in front of the Philadelphia crowd in his final home game to score his 30,000th combined point as an ABA/NBA player. He closed his career out with a loss to the Milwaukee Bucks in the first round.

=== Retirement ===
Erving retired in 1987 at the age of 37. Johnny Kerr told ABA historian Terry Pluto: "A young Julius Erving was like Thomas Edison, he was always inventing something new every night." He is also one of the few players in modern basketball to have his number retired by two franchises: the Brooklyn Nets (formerly the New York Nets and New Jersey Nets) have retired his No. 32 jersey and the Philadelphia 76ers his No. 6 jersey. He was an excellent all-around player who was also an underrated defender. In his ABA days, he would guard the best forward, whether small forward or power forward, for over 40 minutes a game and simultaneously be the best passer, ball handler and clutch scorer every night. Many of Erving's acrobatic highlight feats and clutch moments were unknown because of the ABA's scant television coverage. He is considered by many as the greatest dunker of all time.

In his ABA and NBA careers combined, he scored more than 30,000 points. In 1993, Erving was elected to the Naismith Memorial Basketball Hall of Fame and in 1996 he was inducted into the NYC Basketball Hall of Fame. When he retired, Erving ranked in the top five in scoring (third), field goals made (third), field goals attempted (fifth) and steals (first). On the combined NBA/ABA scoring list, Erving ranked third with 30,026 points. As of 2022, Erving ranks eighth on the list, behind only LeBron James, Kareem Abdul-Jabbar, Karl Malone, Kobe Bryant, Michael Jordan, Dirk Nowitzki and Wilt Chamberlain.

== Legacy ==
=== 1976 ABA Slam Dunk Contest ===
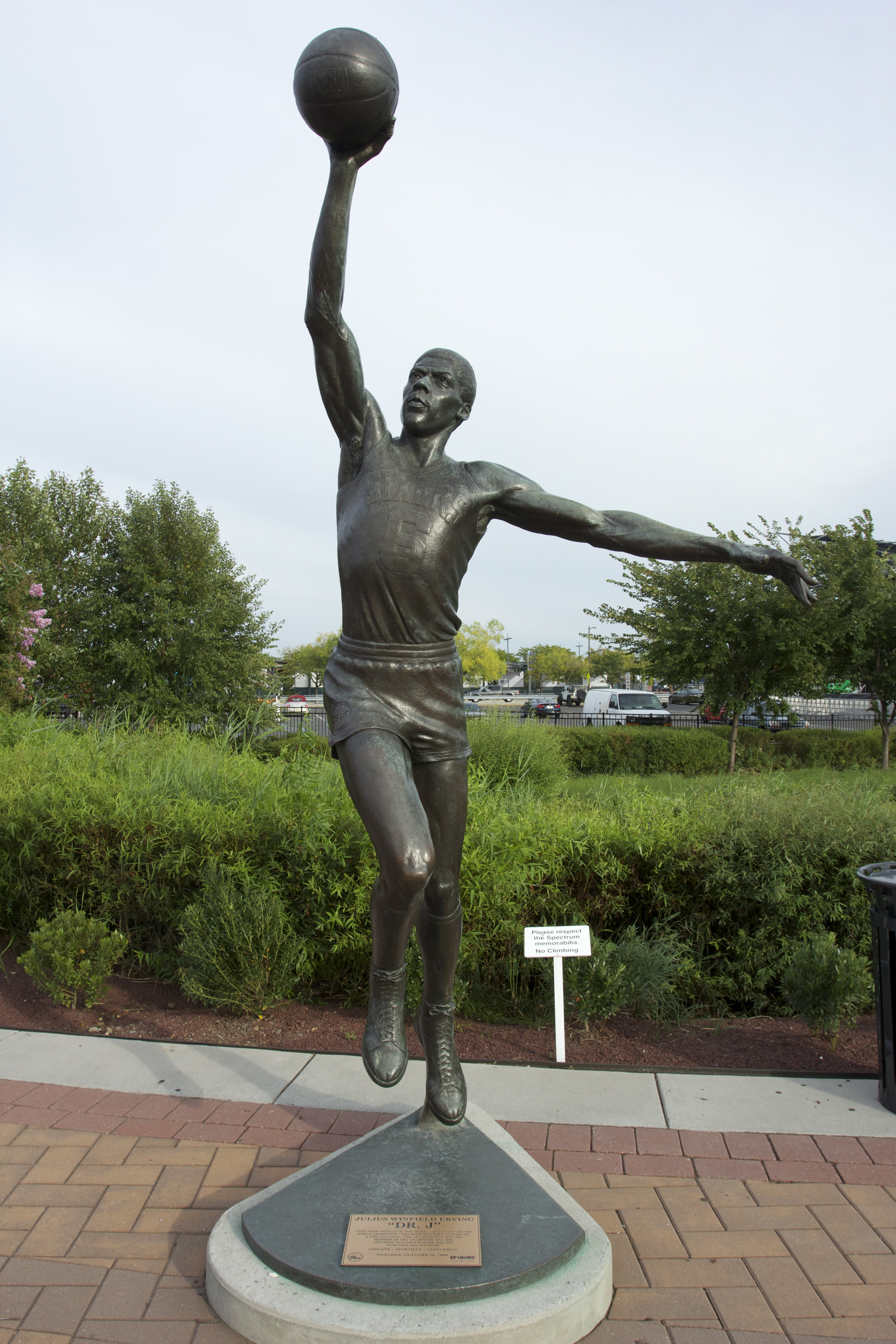
Erving statue in South Philadelphia unveiled in January 1989

In this memorable contest, Erving faced George "The Iceman" Gervin, All-Star and former teammate Larry "Special K" Kenon, MVP Artis "The A-Train" Gilmore and David "The Skywalker" Thompson. Erving started by dunking two balls in the hoop. Then, he performed a move that brought the slam dunk contest to the national consciousness. He ran to the opposite end of the court and back and dunked the basketball from the free throw line. Although dunking from the foul line had been done by other players (Jim Pollard and Wilt Chamberlain in the 1950s, for example), Erving introduced the dunk from the foul line to a wider audience, when he demonstrated the feat in the 1976 ABA All-Star Game Slam Dunk Contest.

=== Dunk over Bill Walton ===
This event transpired during game 6 of the 1977 NBA Finals. After Portland scored a basket, Erving immediately ran the length of the court with the entire Blazers team defending him. He performed a crossover to blow by multiple defenders, seemingly gliding to the hoop with ease. With UCLA defensive legend Bill Walton waiting in the post, Erving threw down a vicious slam dunk over Walton's outstretched arms. This dunk is considered by many to be one of the strongest dunks ever attempted, considering he ran full court with all five defenders running with him. This move was one of the highlights of his arrival to a more television-exposed NBA.

=== Baseline move ===
One of his most memorable plays occurred during the 1980 NBA Finals, when he executed a seemingly impossible finger-roll behind the backboard. He drove past Lakers forward Mark Landsberger on the right baseline and went in for a layup. Then 7′2″ center Kareem Abdul-Jabbar crossed his way, blocking the route to the basket and forcing him outwards. In mid-air, it was apparent that Erving would land behind the backboard. But somehow he managed to reach over and score on a right-handed layup despite the fact that his whole body, including his left shoulder, was already behind the hoop. This move, along with his free-throw line dunk, has become one of the signature events of his career. It was called by Sports Illustrated, "The, No Way, even for Dr. J, Flying Reverse Lay-up". Dr. J called it "just another move".

=== "Rock the Baby" dunk over Michael Cooper ===
Another of Erving's most memorable plays came in the final moments of a regular-season game against the Los Angeles Lakers in 1983. After Sixers point guard Maurice Cheeks deflected a pass by Lakers forward James Worthy, Erving picked up the ball and charged down the court's left side, with one defender to beat—the Lakers' top defender Michael Cooper. As he came inside of the 3-point line, he cupped the ball into his wrist and forearm, rocking the ball back and forth before taking off for what Lakers radio broadcaster Chick Hearn best described as a "Rock the Baby" slam dunk: he slung the ball around behind his head and dunked over a ducking Cooper. This dunk is generally regarded as one of the greatest dunks of all time.

== Post-basketball career ==
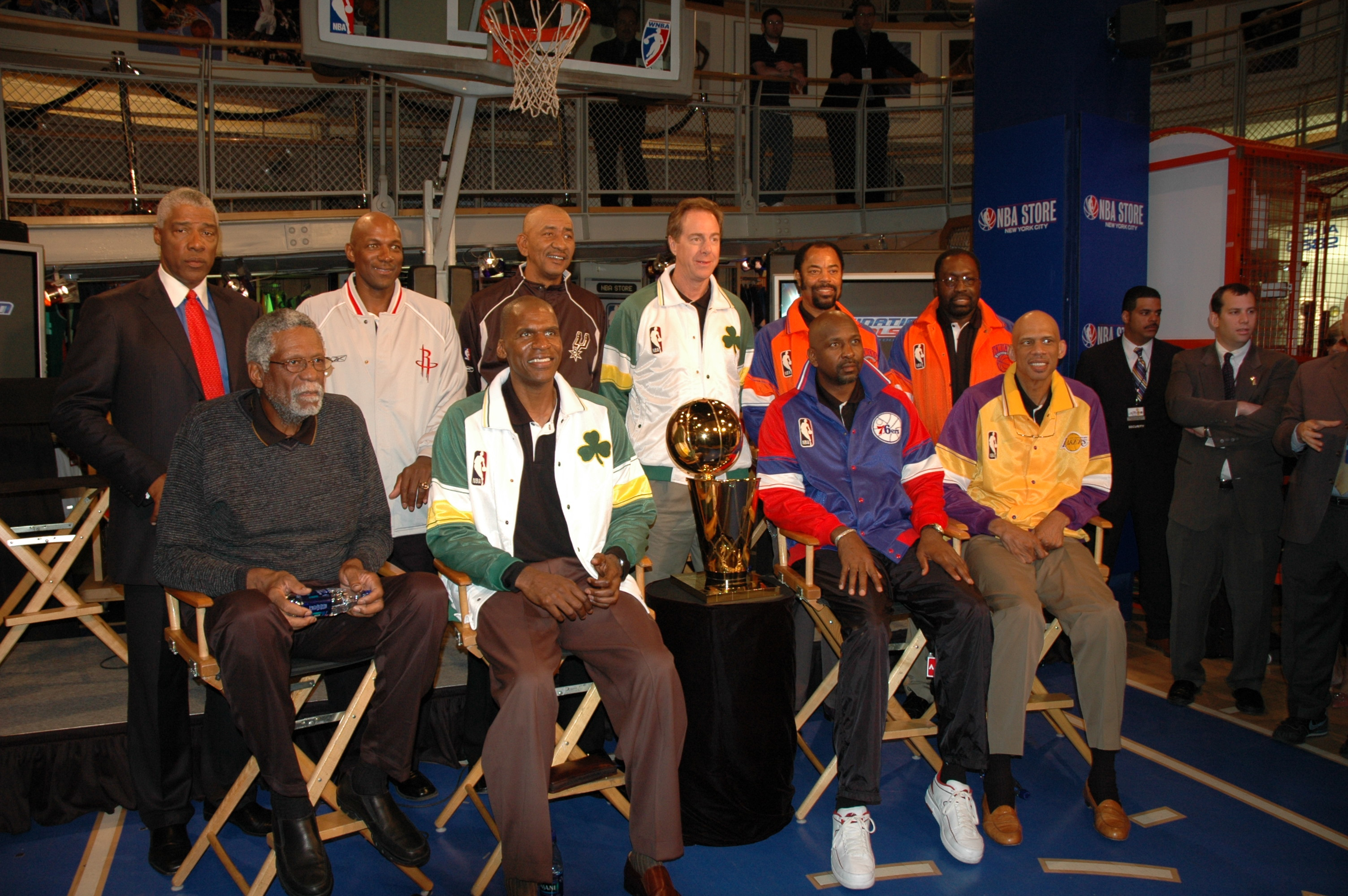
Erving (top left) with other former NBA players visit the New York NBA Store in January 2005

Erving earned his bachelor's degree in 1986 through the University Without Walls at the University of Massachusetts Amherst. After his basketball career ended, he became a businessman, obtaining ownership of a Coca-Cola bottling plant in Philadelphia and doing work as a television analyst. In 1997, he joined the front office of the Orlando Magic as Vice President of RDV Sports and Executive Vice President.

Erving and former NFL running back Joe Washington fielded a NASCAR Busch Series team from 1998 to 2000, becoming the first ever NASCAR racing team at any level owned completely by minorities. The team had secure sponsorship from Dr Pepper for most of its existence. Erving, a racing fan himself, stated that his foray into NASCAR was an attempt to raise interest in NASCAR among African-Americans. He has also served on the Board of Directors of Converse (prior to their 2001 bankruptcy), Darden Restaurants, Saks Incorporated and The Sports Authority. As of 2009, Erving was the owner of The Celebrity Golf Club International outside of Atlanta, but the club was forced to file for bankruptcy soon after. He was ranked by ESPN as one of the greatest athletes of the 20th century.

In 1991 he performed the narration in a performance of Copland's Lincoln Portrait with the Philadelphia Orchestra under Riccardo Muti in a concert to honor the 62nd birthday of the late Martin Luther King Jr. The concert was broadcast and is available on YouTube.

Erving made a cameo appearance in the 1993 movie Philadelphia starring Tom Hanks and Denzel Washington and in the sitcom Hangin' with Mr. Cooper in 1995. He appeared as The Minister in the 2012 remake of Steel Magnolias for Lifetime television. He also made a cameo appearance as himself in "Lice", the tenth episode of the ninth season of the comedy series The Office (2013). Erving appeared as himself in the 2022 movie Hustle starring Adam Sandler and Juancho Hernangómez.

== Career statistics ==
Legend
GP	Games played	GS	Games started	MPG	Minutes per game
FG%	Field goal percentage	3P%	3-point field goal percentage	FT%	Free throw percentage
RPG	Rebounds per game	APG	Assists per game	SPG	Steals per game
BPG	Blocks per game	PPG	Points per game	**Bold**	Career high
†	Won an NBA championship	*	Led the league

†	Denotes seasons in which Erving's team won an ABA championship
*	ABA record

=== Regular season ===
Year	Team	GP	GS	MPG	FG%	3P%	FT%	RPG	APG	SPG	BPG	PPG
1971–72	Virginia (ABA)	**84**	—	41.8	.498	.188	.745	**15.7**	4.0	—	—	27.3
1972–73	Virginia (ABA)	71	—	**42.2***	.496	.208	.776	12.2	4.2	**2.5**	1.8	**31.9***
1973–74†	New York (ABA)	**84**	—	40.5	.512	**.395**	.766	10.7	5.2	2.3	**2.4**	27.4*
1974–75	New York (ABA)	**84***	—	40.5	.506	.333	.799	10.9	**5.5**	2.2	1.9	27.9
1975–76†	New York (ABA)	**84**	—	38.6	.507	.330	.801	11.0	5.0	**2.5**	1.9	29.3*
1976–77	Philadelphia (NBA)	82	—	35.9	.499	—	.777	8.5	3.7	1.9	1.4	21.6
1977–78	Philadelphia (NBA)	74	—	32.8	.502	—	**.845**	6.5	3.8	1.8	1.3	20.6
1978–79	Philadelphia (NBA)	78	—	35.9	.491	—	.745	7.2	4.6	1.7	1.3	23.1
1979–80	Philadelphia (NBA)	78	—	36.1	.519	.200	.787	7.4	4.6	2.2	1.8	26.9
1980–81	Philadelphia (NBA)	82	—	35.0	.521	.222	.787	8.0	4.4	2.1	1.8	24.6
1981–82	Philadelphia (NBA)	81	**81**	34.4	**.546**	.273	.763	6.9	3.9	2.0	1.7	24.4
1982–83†	Philadelphia (NBA)	72	72	33.6	.517	.286	.759	6.8	3.7	1.6	1.8	21.4
1983–84	Philadelphia (NBA)	77	77	34.8	.512	.333	.754	6.9	4.0	1.8	1.8	22.4
1984–85	Philadelphia (NBA)	78	78	32.5	.494	.214	.765	5.3	3.0	1.7	1.4	20.0
1985–86	Philadelphia (NBA)	74	74	33.4	.480	.281	.785	5.0	3.4	1.5	1.1	18.1
1986–87	Philadelphia (NBA)	60	60	32.0	.471	.264	.813	4.4	3.2	1.3	1.6	16.8
Career		1,243	442	36.4	.506	.298	.777	8.5	4.2	2.0	1.7	24.2
All-Star		16	11	28.1	.496	.667	.793	6.7	3.7	1.3	1.0	20.1

=== Playoffs ===
Year	Team	GP	GS	MPG	FG%	3P%	FT%	RPG	APG	SPG	BPG	PPG
1972	Virginia (ABA)	11	—	**45.8**	.518	.250	.835	**20.4**	**6.5**	—	—	33.3
1973	Virginia (ABA)	5	—	43.8	.527	.000	.750	9.0	3.2	—	—	29.6
1974†	New York (ABA)	14	—	41.4	.528	**.455**	.741	9.6	4.8	1.6	1.4	27.9
1975	New York (ABA)	5	—	42.2	.455	.000	.844	9.8	5.6	1.0	1.8	27.4
1976†	New York (ABA)	13	—	42.4	**.533**	.286	.804	12.6	4.9	1.9	2.0	**34.7**
1977	Philadelphia (NBA)	19	—	39.9	.523	—	.821	6.4	4.5	**2.2**	1.2	27.3
1978	Philadelphia (NBA)	10	—	35.8	.489	—	.750	9.7	4.0	1.5	1.8	21.8
1979	Philadelphia (NBA)	9	—	41.3	.517	—	.761	7.8	5.9	2.0	1.9	25.4
1980	Philadelphia (NBA)	18	—	38.6	.488	.222	.794	7.6	4.4	2.0	2.1	24.4
1981	Philadelphia (NBA)	16	—	37.0	.475	.000	.757	7.1	3.4	1.4	**2.6**	22.9
1982	Philadelphia (NBA)	**21**	—	37.1	.519	.167	.752	7.4	4.7	1.8	1.8	22.0
1983†	Philadelphia (NBA)	13	—	37.9	.450	.000	.721	7.6	3.4	1.2	2.1	18.4
1984	Philadelphia (NBA)	5	—	38.8	.474	.000	**.864**	6.4	5.0	1.6	1.2	18.2
1985	Philadelphia (NBA)	13	**13**	33.4	.449	.000	.857	5.6	3.7	1.9	0.8	17.1
1986	Philadelphia (NBA)	12	12	36.1	.450	.182	.738	5.8	4.2	0.9	1.3	17.7
1987	Philadelphia (NBA)	5	5	36.0	.415	.333	.840	5.0	3.4	1.4	1.2	18.2
Career		189	30	38.9	.496	.224	.784	8.5	4.4	1.7	1.7	24.2

=== Career highs ===
Statistic	Value	Opponent	Date
Points	45	vs. Boston Celtics	November 1, 1980
Field goals made	19	at Cleveland Cavaliers	March 16, 1980
Field goal attempts	32	at Cleveland Cavaliers	January 19, 1978
Free throws made, one missed	19-20	vs. Chicago Bulls	March 28, 1979
Free throws made	19	vs. Chicago Bulls	March 28, 1979
Free throw attempts	20	vs. Chicago Bulls	March 28, 1979
Steals	8	vs. Washington Bullets	November 12, 1976
Blocked Shots	8	vs. Detroit Pistons	December 11, 1982
Blocked Shots, half (1st)	7	vs. Milwaukee Bucks	March 28, 1986
Turnovers	10	at Atlanta Hawks	November 15, 1977

=== Records ===
- One of seven players to record 1,300 steals and 1,300 blocked shots in their ABA/NBA career:
  - Also achieved by Kevin Garnett, Bobby Jones, Hakeem Olajuwon, Clifford Robinson, David Robinson and Ben Wallace
- Only known NBA player to get:
  - 42 points, 18 rebounds and 4 blocked shots while shooting 100% from the free-throw line in a game (October 10, 1973)
  - 49 points, 6 assists, 5 steals and 3 blocked shots in a game (January 10, 1976)
  - 28 points, 10 assists, 5 steals and 5 blocked shots (December 5, 1979 and November 27, 1981)
  - 39 points, 7 rebounds and 3 steals while shooting 87.5% from the field and 100% from the free-throw line (March 2, 1980)
  - 34 points, 7 steals and 3 blocked shots while shooting 72% from the field (November 12, 1980)
  - 39 points, 3 steals, 3 blocked shots and 2 or less turnovers while shooting 72% from the field and 92% from the free-throw line (February 25, 1981)
  - 30 points, 7 assists, 5 steals and 4 blocked shots while shooting 80% from the field and 100% from the free-throw line in a game (March 14, 1982)
  - 44 points, 11 rebounds, 7 assists and 8 blocked shots while shooting 68% from the field in a game (December 11, 1982)
- Only known player in NBA history with multiple games of:
  - 4 steals and 4 blocked shots while shooting 75% from the floor and 83% from the free-throw line (March 14, 1982 and February 10, 1983)
- One of two known players in NBA history with multiple games of:
  - 7 assists, 5 steals and 4 blocked shots while shooting 100% from the free-throw line (December 5, 1979, March 14, 1982)
    - Other player is Hakeem Olajuwon, January 25, 1994, April 7, 1994
  - 42 points, 7 rebounds, 6 assists and 4 blocked shots (December 11, 1982 and February 8, 1984)
    - Other player is Michael Jordan, who has three (January 26, 1985, February 16, 1987, and March 11, 1987)
- One of two known NBA players to get:
  - 49 points, 8 rebounds, 5 steals and 3 blocked shots while shooting 90% from the free-throw line in a game (January 10, 1976)
    - Other player is Anthony Davis, October 26, 2016
  - 28 points, 10 assists, 8 steals and 2 blocked shots in a game (November 12, 1976)
    - Other player is Larry Bird, February 18, 1985
  - 40 points, 8 assists and 6 steals while shooting 100% from the free-throw line in a game (April 9, 1977)
    - Other player is Rick Barry, November 3, 1974
  - 40 points, 11 rebounds, 8 assists and 6 steals in a game while shooting 100% from the free-throw line (April 9, 1979 – playoffs)
    - Other player is Michael Jordan, Chicago at New York, May 13, 1989 – playoffs
  - 40 points, 11 rebounds, 6 steals and 100% from the free throw line (April 9, 1977)
    - Other player is James Harden, February 2, 2019
- 10 assists, 5 steals and 5 blocked shots while shooting 100% from the free-throw line in a game (December 5, 1979)
    - Other player is Jamaal Tinsley, November 16, 2001
  - 30 points, 7 assists and 4 blocked shots while shooting 80% from the field in a game (March 14, 1982)
    - Other player is Kareem Abdul-Jabbar, December 9, 1979
  - 13 rebounds, 7 assists and 5 steals while shooting 80% from the floor in a game (March 14, 1982)
    - Other player is Fat Lever, November 24, 1987
  - 13 rebounds and 5 steals while shooting 80% from the field and 100% from the free-throw line in a game (March 14, 1982)
    - Other player is Brian Grant, March 29, 2002
  - 30 points and 5 steals while shooting 80% from the field and 100% from the free-throw line in a game (March 14, 1982)
    - Other player is Amar'e Stoudemire, November 5, 2008
  - 44 points, 11 rebounds and 8 blocked shots while shooting 68% from the field in a game (December 11, 1982)
    - Other player is Dwight Howard, February 17, 2009
- One of three known players in NBA history to get:
  - 49 points, 8 rebounds, 6 assists and 5 steals in a game while shooting 100% from the free-throw line in a game (January 10, 1976)
    - Other players are Rick Barry, March 26, 1974, and Amar'e Stoudemire, November 5, 2008
  - 40 points, 10 rebounds, 7 assists and 6 steals in a game (April 9, 1977)
    - Other players are Larry Bird, January 10, 1982, and Michael Jordan, January 3, 1989, and May 13, 1989 – playoffs)
  - 30 points, 7 assists and 5 steals while shooting 80% from the field in a game (March 14, 1982)
    - Other players are Kareem Abdul-Jabbar, March 14, 1976, and Ben Simmons, January 20, 2020
  - 13 rebounds, 5 steals and 4 blocked shots while shooting 80% from the field in a game (March 14, 1982)
    - Other players are Darryl Dawkins, November 3, 1983 and Buck Williams, January 16, 1985
  - 7 assists and 4 blocked shots while shooting 80% from the field and 100% from the free-throw line in a game (March 14, 1982)
    - Other players are Kareem Abdul-Jabbar, December 9, 1979, and Jusuf Nurkic, January 11, 2019

== Awards and honors ==
Halls of Fame

- Naismith Memorial Basketball Hall of Fame – Class of 1993
- National Collegiate Basketball Hall of Fame – Inaugural Class of 2006
- NYC Basketball Hall of Fame – Class of 1996
- University of Massachusetts Athletics Hall of Fame – Class of 1980
- Long Island Sports Hall of Fame – Inaugural Class of 1984

NBA

- NBA champion (1983)
- NBA Most Valuable Player (1981)
- 2× ABA champion (1974, 1976)
- 2× ABA Playoffs MVP (1974, 1976)
- 3× ABA Most Valuable Player (1974–1976)
- 11× NBA All-Star (1977–1987)
- 5× ABA All-Star (1972–1976)
- 2× NBA All-Star Game MVP (1977, 1983)
- 5× All-NBA First Team (1978, 1980–1983)
- 2× All-NBA Second Team (1977, 1984)
- 4× All-ABA First Team (1973–1976)
- All-ABA Second Team (1972)
- ABA All-Defensive First Team (1976)
- ABA All-Rookie First Team (1972)
- 3× ABA scoring champion (1973, 1974, 1976)
- ABA Slam Dunk champion (1976)
- ABA All-Time Team
- ABA All-time MVP
- NBA anniversary team (35th, 50th, 75th)
- No. 32 retired by Brooklyn Nets
- No. 6 retired by Philadelphia 76ers
- J. Walter Kennedy Citizenship Award (1983)
- Statue of Julius Erving outside the Philadelphia 76ers Training Complex (2018)
- In 2023, the NBA named the Slam Dunk Contest champion trophy in his honor

NCAA

- 2× Yankee Conference Champion (1970, 1971)
- UPI Third-team All-American (1971)
- NABC Third-team All-American (1971)
- AP All-American Honorable Mention (1971)
- No. 32 retired by UMass Minutemen
- The Julius Erving Award is given annually to the top men's collegiate small forward
- Statue of Julius Erving outside the Mullins Center (2021)

Media

- 2× Metropolitan Basketball Writers Association Outstanding ABA Player of the Year (1974, 1975)
- Sporting News NBA MVP (1981)
- Sporting News NBA/ABA 1970s All-Decade First Team
- Sporting News NBA 1980s All-Decade First Team
- AP NBA 1980s All-Decade Team
- Sports Illustrated's 40 Most Influential Sports Figures (1994)
- Academy of Achievement Golden Plate Award (1988)
- Harold & Carole Pump Foundation – Lifetime Achievement Award (2012)
- Nancy Lieberman Charities – Trailblazer Award (2019)

Other

- In 2018, the BIG3 named their championship trophy in honor of Dr. J

== Personal life ==
Erving is a Christian. He has spoken about his faith, saying: "After searching for the meaning of life for over ten years, I found the meaning in Jesus Christ."

Erving is a second cousin of economist Walter E. Williams.

Erving was married to Turquoise Erving from 1972 until 2003. Together they had four children. In 2000, their 19-year-old son Cory went missing for 38 days, until he was found drowned after driving his vehicle into a pond.

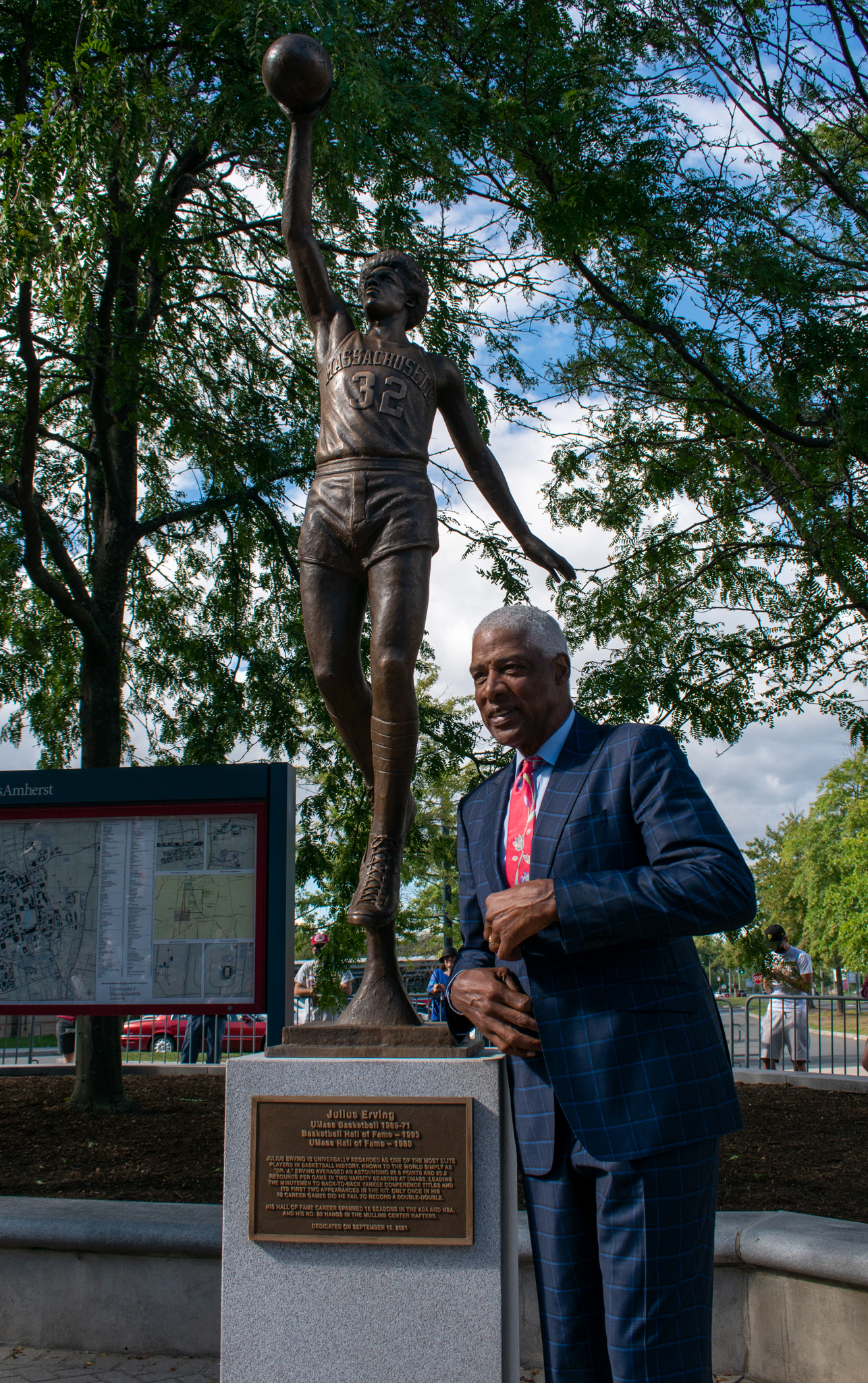
Erving standing next to the statue depicting his likeness at the UMass unveiling ceremony in Amherst, Mass., in September 2021.

In 1979, Erving began an affair with sportswriter Samantha Stevenson, resulting in the 1980 birth of Alexandra Stevenson, who would become a professional tennis player. Although Erving's fatherhood of Alexandra Stevenson was known privately to the families involved, it did not become public knowledge until Stevenson reached the semifinals at Wimbledon in 1999, the first year she qualified to play in the tournament. Erving had provided financial support for Stevenson over the years, but had not otherwise been part of her life. The public disclosure of their relationship did not initially lead to contact between father and daughter; however, Stevenson contacted Erving in 2008 and they finally initiated a further relationship. Erving met Stevenson for the first time on October 31, 2008. In 2009, Erving attended the Family Circle Cup tennis tournament to see Stevenson play, marking the first time he had attended one of her matches.

In 1988, Erving received the Golden Plate Award of the American Academy of Achievement. In 2003, Erving fathered a second child outside of his marriage, Justin Kangas, with a woman named Dorýs Madden. Julius and Turquoise Erving were subsequently divorced and Erving continued his relationship with Madden, with whom he had three more children, Jules Erving and two others including Julieta who was born in 2005. They married in 2008 and moved from St. George, Utah to Buckhead, Atlanta in Georgia in 2009 while managing their Atlanta golf and country club.

On September 10, 2021, Erving attended an unveiling ceremony at the University of Massachusetts Amherst for statues honoring himself and fellow UMass alumni and Basketball Hall of Fame members John Calipari, Marcus Camby and Jack Leaman. The ceremony was attended by former teammates, coaches, family and current players of the UMass men's and women's basketball teams.

== Community art ==
The Dr. J mural is located on the corner of Green Street and Ridge Avenue near Spring Garden Street in Philadelphia, PA.

From Mural Arts Philadelphia:
"Feeling restless and desperate to improve the quality and variety of the murals, Jane [Golden] made a decision in 1990 that would forever change Mural Arts Philadelphia. She raised money from private foundation to bring her old friend and mentor Kent Twitchell to Philadelphia. She wanted a "breakthrough mural," and Twitchell—a nationally acclaimed California artist—was just the man to paint it. "We knew we had to push the boundaries," she said. "The goal was to try to integrate superior artwork with a subject that touched the community in a special way."

Twitchell was known for his portraits and he lobbied to paint basketball great Julius Erving in a business suit instead of a uniform to portray him more as a man and role model than simply another well-known athlete. The dignified, full-length portrait is so tall that Erving's head just fits under the peak of the three-story building. The image was first painted on large squares of parachute cloth, which were then adhered to the wall surface with acrylic gel. The cloth's smooth surface allowed Twitchell to craft Erving with uncannily realistic detail, from the crease in his tan suit trousers to the gold bracelet on his right hand. Local residents, who maintain a small park in front of the mural, claim that the real Dr. J had tears in his eyes when he saw the completed portrait for the first time. Dr. J is also the only Philadelphia mural so respected that it appears in homage in another mural, the student-painted panorama of urban life on the Spring Garden Street Bridge.

"The mural was universally applauded. It showed that murals have the potential to be great. The level of expectation was raised," Jane said. The mural helped alter public opinion about the program, too. "The art snobs, people who'd been looking down at our murals, started to change. There was a ripple effect—foundation and grants started to emerge."

== See also ==
- List of NBA franchise career scoring leaders
- List of NBA career playoff steals leaders
- List of NBA career playoff blocks leaders
- List of NBA career playoff turnovers leaders
- List of NBA single-game steals leaders
