= Institute for Global Ethics =

American nonprofit organization

The Institute for Global Ethics (abbreviated IGE) is a 501(c)(3) nonsectarian, nonpartisan, global research and educational non-profit organization based in Middleton, Wisconsin.

== History ==
With initial funding provided by the W.K. Kellogg Foundation, the Institute for Global Ethics was founded by Rushworth Kidder in Camden, Maine in 1990. The Institute is dedicated to exploring the idea of shared moral values as well as committed to helping organizations and individuals put those values into practice, finding frameworks that tackle tough issues.

== Mission ==
To promote ethical behavior in individuals, institutions, and nations through research, public discourse, and practical action.

== Ethical Fitness ==
Through its research, the Institute has developed a decision making framework currently being used by corporations, schools, governments, and organizations worldwide. This process has been trademarked by the Institute under the name Ethical Fitness. This framework is the main pedagogical thrust of Kidder's book How Good People Make Tough Choices.

== Books ==
- The Ethics Recession (2009), ISBN 978-0-615-27535-2
- Moral Courage (2005), ISBN 0-06-059154-4
- How Good People Make Tough Choices: Resolving the Dilemmas of Ethical Living (1995), ISBN 0-688-13442-4
- Shared Values for a Troubled World: Conversations With Men and Women of Conscience (1994), ISBN 1-55542-603-4
- Reinventing the Future: Global Goals for the 21st Century (1989), ISBN 0-262-11146-2

== Other publications ==
The Institute has published an electronic weekly newsletter since February 1998 called Ethics Newsline.
