= McKinney–Vento Homeless Assistance Act =

Federal law in the United States

- Other short titles: Urgent Relief for the Homeless Act
- Long title: An Act to provide urgently needed assistance to protect and improve the lives and safety of the homeless, with special emphasis on elderly persons, handicapped persons, and families with children.
- Nicknames: Stewart B. McKinney Homeless Assistance Act
- Enacted by: the 100th United States Congress
- Effective: July 22, 1987

Citations
- Public law: 100-77
- Statutes at Large: 101 Stat. 482

Codification
- Titles amended: 42 U.S.C.: Public Health and Social Welfare
- U.S.C. sections created: 42 U.S.C. ch. 119 § 11301 et seq.

Legislative history
- Introduced in the House as H.R. 558 by Tom Foley (D–WA) on January 8, 1987; Committee consideration by House Banking, Finance, and Urban Affairs, House Energy and Commerce; Passed the House on March 5, 1987 (264-121); Passed the Senate on April 9, 1987 (Passed voice vote, in lieu of S. 809, S. 810, S. 811, S. 813, S. 728); Reported by the joint conference committee on May 20, 1987; agreed to by the Senate on June 27, 1987 (65-8) and by the House on June 30, 1987 (301–115); Signed into law by President Ronald Reagan on July 22, 1987

The McKinney–Vento Homeless Assistance Act of 1987 is a United States federal law that provides federal money for homeless shelter programs. It was the first significant federal legislative response to homelessness, and was passed by the 100th United States Congress and signed into law by President Ronald Reagan on July 22, 1987. The act has been reauthorized several times over the years.

With the death of Stewart McKinney, its chief sponsor, it was renamed Stewart B. McKinney Homeless Assistance Act. After the death in October 2000 of a leading supporter of the legislation, Bruce Vento, President Bill Clinton renamed it the McKinney-Vento Homeless Assistance Act.

The McKinney Act originally had fifteen programs providing a spectrum of services to homeless people, including the Continuum of Care Programs: the Supportive Housing Program, the Shelter Plus Care Program, and the Single Room Occupancy Program, as well as the Emergency Shelter Grant Program. It also established the Interagency Council on the Homeless, now the Interagency Council on Homelessness.

== Congressional findings and purpose ==
These are the findings and purpose from the law as of January 6, 1999:

(a) Findings
The Congress finds that —

1. the Nation faces an immediate and unprecedented crisis due to the lack of shelter for a growing number of individuals and families, including elderly persons, handicapped persons, families with children, Native Americans, and veterans;
2. the problem of homelessness has become more severe and, in the absence of more effective efforts, is expected to become dramatically worse, endangering the lives and safety of the homeless;
3. the causes of homelessness are many and complex, and homeless individuals have diverse needs;
4. there is no single, simple solution to the problem of homelessness because of the different sub-populations of the homeless, the different causes of and reasons for homelessness, and the different needs of homeless individuals;
5. due to the record increase in homelessness, States, units of local government, and private voluntary organizations have been unable to meet the basic human needs of all the homeless and, in the absence of greater Federal assistance, will be unable to protect the lives and safety of all the homeless in need of assistance; and
6. the Federal Government has a clear responsibility and an existing capacity to fulfill a more effective and responsible role to meet the basic human needs and to engender respect for the human dignity of the homeless.

(b) Purpose
It is the purpose of this chapter —

1. to establish an Interagency Council on the Homeless;
2. to use public resources and programs in a more coordinated manner to meet the critically urgent needs of the homeless of the Nation; and
3. to provide funds for programs to assist the homeless, with special emphasis on elderly persons, handicapped persons, families with children, Native Americans, and veterans.

(Pub. L. 100-77, title I, Sec. 102, July 22, 1987, 101 Stat. 484.)

== Homeless children and education ==
The original federal Act, known simply as the McKinney Act, provided little protection for homeless children in the area of public education. As a result, the State of Illinois passed the Illinois Education for Homeless Children Act, which was drafted by Joseph Clary, an attorney and advocate for the Illinois Coalition to End Homelessness. Clary then worked with national advocates to ensure that the protections afforded to homeless children by the Illinois statute were incorporated into the McKinney Act.

At that point, the McKinney Act was amended to become the McKinney-Vento Act. That Act uses the Illinois statute in defining homeless children as "individuals who lack a fixed, regular, and adequate nighttime residence." The Act then goes on to give examples of children who would fall under the following definition:

- (a) Children with their families sharing housing due to economic hardship or loss of housing;
- (b) Children with their families living in "motels, hotels, trailer parks, or camp grounds due to lack of alternative accommodations"
- (c) Children with their families living in "emergency or transitional shelters"
- (d) Children with their families whose primary nighttime residence is not ordinarily used as a regular sleeping accommodation (e.g. park benches, etc.)
- (e) Children with their families living in "cars, parks, public spaces, abandoned buildings, substandard housing, bus or train stations..."

Following the Illinois statute, the McKinney-Vento Act ensures homeless children transportation to and from school free of charge, allowing children to attend their school of origin (the last school enrolled, or the school they attended when they first became homeless) regardless of what district the family resides in. It requires schools to register homeless children even if they lack normally required documents, such as immunization records or proof of residence.

To implement the Act, States must designate a statewide homeless coordinator to review policies and create procedures, including dispute resolution procedures, to ensure that homeless children are able to attend school. Local school districts must appoint Local Education Liaisons to ensure that school staff are aware of these rights, to provide public notice to homeless families (at shelters and at school) and to facilitate access to school and transportation services.
