= List of NBA players (I–J) =

This is a list of National Basketball Association players whose last names begin with I or J.

The list also includes players from the American National Basketball League (NBL), the Basketball Association of America (BAA), and the original American Basketball Association (ABA). All of these leagues contributed to the formation of the present-day NBA.

Individuals who played in the NBL prior to its 1949 merger with the BAA are listed in italics, as they are not traditionally listed in the NBA's official player registers.

== I ==
- Marc Iavaroni
- Serge Ibaka
- Oso Ighodaro
- Andre Iguodala
- Žydrūnas Ilgauskas
- Mile Ilić
- Ersan İlyasova
- Graham Ike
- Darrall Imhoff
- Tom Ingelsby
- Joe Ingles
- Damien Inglis
- Andre Ingram
- Brandon Ingram
- Harrison Ingram
- McCoy Ingram
- Ervin Inniger
- Byron Irvin
- George Irvine
- Kyrie Irving
- Jonathan Isaac
- John Isaacs
- Dan Issel
- Mike Iuzzolino
- Allen Iverson
- Willie Iverson
- Jaden Ivey
- Royal Ivey
- Elvin Ivory
- Wes Iwundu

== J ==
- Warren Jabali
- George Jablonski
- Jarrett Jack
- Aaron Jackson
- Al Jackson
- Andre Jackson Jr.
- Bobby Jackson
- Cedric Jackson
- Darnell Jackson
- Demetrius Jackson
- Frank Jackson
- GG Jackson
- Greg Jackson
- Isaiah Jackson
- Jaren Jackson
- Jaren Jackson Jr.
- Jermaine Jackson
- Jim Jackson
- Josh Jackson
- Justin Jackson
- Lucious Jackson
- Luke Jackson
- Marc Jackson
- Mark Jackson
- Mervin Jackson
- Michael Jackson
- Mike Jackson
- Myron Jackson
- Phil Jackson
- Pierre Jackson
- Quenton Jackson
- Ralph Jackson
- Randell Jackson
- Reggie Jackson
- Stan Jackson
- Stanley Jackson
- Stephen Jackson
- Tony Jackson (b. 1942)
- Tony Jackson (b. 1958)
- Tracy Jackson
- Wardell Jackson
- Trayce Jackson-Davis
- Fred Jacobs
- Casey Jacobsen
- Sam Jacobson
- Stub Jacobson
- Lou Jagnow
- Kasparas Jakučionis
- Dave Jamerson
- Aaron James
- Bernard James
- Billy James
- Bronny James
- Damion James
- Gene James
- Henry James
- Jerome James
- Justin James
- LeBron James
- Mike James (b. 1975)
- Mike James (b. 1990)
- Sion James
- Tim James
- Antawn Jamison
- Harold Jamison
- John Janisch
- Howie Janotta
- Jaime Jaquez Jr.
- Marko Jarić
- Tony Jaros
- DeJon Jarreau
- Jim Jarvis
- Šarūnas Jasikevičius
- Nathan Jawai
- Buddy Jeannette
- Abdul Jeelani
- Chris Jefferies
- Othyus Jeffers
- Al Jefferson
- Amile Jefferson
- Cory Jefferson
- Dontell Jefferson
- Joshua Jefferson
- Richard Jefferson
- DaQuan Jeffries
- Jared Jeffries
- Trey Jemison
- Charles Jenkins
- Daniss Jenkins
- Horace Jenkins
- John Jenkins
- Brandon Jennings
- Jack Jennings
- Keith Jennings
- Chris Jent
- Les Jepsen
- Jonas Jerebko
- Ty Jerome
- Grant Jerrett
- Bill Jesko
- Eugene Jeter
- Hal Jeter
- Charlie Joachim
- Isaiah Joe
- Britton Johnsen
- AJ Johnson
- Al Johnson
- Alexander Johnson
- Alize Johnson
- Amir Johnson
- Andy Johnson
- Anthony Johnson
- Armon Johnson
- Arnie Johnson
- Avery Johnson
- B. J. Johnson
- Boag Johnson
- Bob Johnson
- Brice Johnson
- Buck Johnson
- Cameron Johnson
- Carldell Johnson
- Chaney Johnson
- Charles Johnson
- Chris Johnson (b. 1985)
- Chris Johnson (b. 1990)
- Clay Johnson
- Clemon Johnson
- Dakari Johnson
- Darryl Johnson
- Dave Johnson (b. 1970)
- David Johnson (b. 2001)
- DeMarco Johnson
- Dennis Johnson
- DerMarr Johnson
- Ed Johnson
- Eddie Johnson (b. 1955)
- Eddie Johnson (b. 1959)
- Elmer Johnson
- Eric Johnson
- Ervin Johnson
- Frank Johnson
- George Johnson (b. 1947)
- George Johnson (b. 1948)
- George Johnson (b. 1956)
- Gus Johnson
- Harold Johnson
- Ivan Johnson
- JaJuan Johnson
- Jalen Johnson
- James Johnson
- Joe Johnson
- John Johnson
- Kannard Johnson
- Keldon Johnson
- Ken Johnson (b. 1962)
- Ken Johnson (b. 1978)
- Keon Johnson
- Keshad Johnson
- Kevin Johnson
- Keyontae Johnson
- Larry Johnson (b. 1954)
- Larry Johnson (b. 1969)
- Lee Johnson
- Linton Johnson
- Lynbert Johnson
- Magic Johnson
- Marques Johnson
- Mickey Johnson
- Morris Johnson
- Morez Johnson Jr.
- Neil Johnson
- Nick Johnson
- Ollie Johnson
- Omari Johnson
- Orlando Johnson
- Reggie Johnson
- Rich Johnson
- Ron Johnson
- Splinter Johnson
- Stanley Johnson
- Steffond Johnson
- Steve Johnson
- Stew Johnson
- Tre Johnson
- Trey Johnson
- Tyler Johnson
- Vinnie Johnson
- Wesley Johnson
- Darius Johnson-Odom
- Nate Johnston
- Neil Johnston
- Jim Johnstone
- Nikola Jokić
- Howie Jolliff
- Alvin Jones
- Anthony Jones
- Askia Jones
- Bill Jones (b. 1914)
- Bill Jones (b. 1966)
- Bobby Jones (b. 1951)
- Bobby Jones (b. 1984)
- Caldwell Jones
- Carlik Jones
- Casey Jones
- Charles Jones (b. 1957)
- Charles Jones (b. 1962)
- Charles Jones (b. 1975)
- Colby Jones
- Collis Jones
- Curtis Jones
- Dahntay Jones
- Damian Jones
- Damon Jones
- DeQuan Jones
- Derrick Jones Jr.
- Dillon Jones
- Dominique Jones
- Dontae' Jones
- Dwayne Jones
- Dwight Jones
- Earl Jones
- Eddie Jones
- Edgar Jones
- Fred Jones
- Herbert Jones
- Hutch Jones
- Isaac Jones
- Jake Jones
- Jalen Jones
- James Jones
- Jemerrio Jones
- Jimmy Jones
- Johnny Jones
- Jumaine Jones
- K. C. Jones
- Kai Jones
- Kam Jones
- Kevin Jones
- Larry Jones
- Major Jones
- Mark Jones (b. 1961)
- Mark Jones (b. 1975)
- Mason Jones
- Nick Jones
- Ozell Jones
- Perry Jones
- Popeye Jones
- Rich Jones
- Robin Jones
- Sam Jones
- Shelton Jones
- Solomon Jones
- Spencer Jones
- Steve Jones
- Terrence Jones
- Tre Jones
- Tyus Jones
- Wah Wah Jones
- Wali Jones
- Wil Jones
- Willie Jones
- David Jones García
- Adonis Jordan
- Charles Jordan
- DeAndre Jordan
- Eddie Jordan
- Jerome Jordan
- Ken Jordan
- Michael Jordan
- Reggie Jordan
- Thomas Jordan
- Walter Jordan
- Phil Jordon
- Johnny Jorgensen
- Noble Jorgensen
- Roger Jorgensen
- Cory Joseph
- Garth Joseph
- Kris Joseph
- Yvon Joseph
- Nikola Jović
- Jimmy Joyce
- Kevin Joyce
- Butch Joyner
- Jeff Judkins
- Paul Juntunen
- Johnny Juzang
