= 1974–75 San Diego Conquistadors season =

Basketball season

- Head coach: Alex Groza (15–23); Beryl Shipley (16–30)
- Arena: San Diego Sports Arena

Results
- Record: 31–53 (.369)
- Place: Division: 5th (ABA)
- Radio: KOGO

The 1974–75 San Diego Conquistadors season was the third and final full season of play for the Conquistadors in the American Basketball Association. While the team was finally was able to play in the San Diego Sports Arena due to the franchise being able to resolve something with proprietor Peter Graham by this time, the Conquistadors still floundered both on the court and in the box office, with Wilt Chamberlain having left the team's coaching staff after the previous season due to his increasing lack of care in being a head coach without playing basketball on his end. They finished fifth in points per game at 109.9, but worst in points allowed at 115.5 per game. One of the most notable games they played was against the New York Nets in a quadruple-overtime game on February 14, winning what would become the highest-scoring game in ABA history in a 176–166 final score (which would be the highest-scoring professional basketball game overall (either in the ABA or NBA) until the Detroit Pistons (who previously won the lowest-scoring game in NBA history back when they were the Fort Wayne Pistons) defeated the Denver Nuggets in a 186–184 triple-overtime game in the NBA on December 13, 1983). A victory over the Virginia Squires (the worst team of the entire ABA not just during this season, but arguably all time in terms of seasons completed at this time) on March 12 turned out to be their last, as they would lose 11 straight games to end the season, finishing the Western Division dead last and failing to make it to the 1975 ABA Playoffs by 7 games. After this season ended, Frank Goldberg (who formerly held ownership interest in the Denver Nuggets) bought the San Diego Conquistadors, assuming the $2 million in team debt that was held at that point in time. Goldberg soon renamed the team for the upcoming season, with the team now becoming the San Diego Sails for what would have later become the ABA's final season of play. However, the Sails would ultimately fold only 11 games into that brief season of theirs.

== ABA Draft ==
Round	Pick	Player	Position(s)	Nationality	College
1	3	Major Jones	PF	United States	Albany State
1	8	Cliff Pondexter	PF	United States	Long Beach State
2	13	Gus Bailey	SG/SF	United States	UTEP
4	33	Richie O'Connor	G	United States	Fairfield
5	44	Greg Lee	PG	United States	UCLA
6	53	Richard Wallace	G	United States	Georgia Southern College
7	64	Leon Benbow	SG	United States	Jacksonville
8	73	Daniel Anderson	PG	United States	USC
9	84	Stan Washington	PG	United States	San Diego
10	93	Marques Johnson	SF	United States	UCLA

The alternating draft picks after the third round relates to them tying the Denver Rockets (now Denver Nuggets) in terms of records last season. Also, this draft table does not include the "ABA Draft of NBA Players" done immediately afterward.

=== ABA Draft of NBA Players ===
Round	Pick	Player	Position(s)	Nationality	College	NBA Team
1	4	Cazzie Russell	SF	United States	Michigan	Golden State Warriors
2	13	Sidney Wicks	PF	United States	UCLA	Portland Trail Blazers
3	24	Curtis Rowe	PF	United States	UCLA	Detroit Pistons
4	33	Gail Goodrich	SG	United States	UCLA	Los Angeles Lakers
5	44	Connie Hawkins	PF/C	United States	Iowa	Los Angeles Lakers

The "ABA Draft of NBA Players" that was done on April 17, 1974 happened immediately after the actual ABA Draft done for this season was concluded on that day. None of the five players drafted by the Conquistadors would report to the team this season, though Connie Hawkins previously played a couple of seasons with the formerly existing Pittsburgh/Minnesota Pipers before being unbanned by the NBA (with his prior banning relating to alleged involvement with Jack Molinas in the 1961 NCAA University Division men's basketball gambling scandal during his freshman year at the University of Iowa when he didn't play college basketball whatsoever there) and signing a deal with that league's Phoenix Suns in 1969. Incidentally, Hawkins would also join Gail Goodrich as the only selections by the Conquistadors there to become future members of the Naismith Basketball Hall of Fame.

== Roster ==
1974–75 San Diego Conquistadors roster
Players

Pos.	No.	Player	Height	Weight	DOB	From
SF	12	George Adams	6 ft 5 in (1.96 m)	210 lb (95 kg)	May 15, 1949	Gardner–Webb
PF	25	Tim Bassett	6 ft 8 in (2.03 m)	225 lb (102 kg)	April 1, 1951	Georgia
PF	8	Lee Davis	6 ft 8 in (2.03 m)	235 lb (107 kg)	October 11, 1945	North Carolina Central
SF		Scott English	6 ft 6 in (1.98 m)	205 lb (93 kg)	October 20, 1950	UTEP
SF	33, 42	Travis Grant	6 ft 7 in (2.01 m)	215 lb (98 kg)	January 1, 1950	Kentucky State
SG	6	Billy Harris	6 ft 2 in (1.88 m)	185 lb (84 kg)	November 12, 1951	Northern Illinois
SG	2	Warren Jabali	6 ft 2 in (1.88 m)	200 lb (91 kg)	August 29, 1946	Wichita State
PF	2	Stew Johnson	6 ft 8 in (2.03 m)	220 lb (100 kg)	August 19, 1944	Murray State
C	3	Caldwell Jones	6 ft 11 in (2.11 m)	217 lb (98 kg)	August 4, 1950	Albany State
PG	10	Bo Lamar	6 ft 1 in (1.85 m)	180 lb (82 kg)	April 7, 1951	Louisiana
PG	2	Greg Lee	6 ft 3 in (1.91 m)	190 lb (86 kg)	December 12, 1951	UCLA
SF	4	Bob Nash	6 ft 8 in (2.03 m)	195 lb (88 kg)	August 24, 1950	Hawaiʻi
PG	3	Jim O'Brien	6 ft 1 in (1.85 m)	170 lb (77 kg)	April 9, 1950	Boston College
C		Reggie Royals	6 ft 10 in (2.08 m)	200 lb (91 kg)	September 18, 1950	Florida State
PG	8	Art Williams	6 ft 1 in (1.85 m)	180 lb (82 kg)	September 29, 1939	Cal Poly Pomona

Coaches
Head coach

Alex Groza / Beryl Shipley

Legend
- (DP) Unsigned draft pick
- (FA) Free agent
- (S) Suspended
- Injured

Roster

== Final standings ==
=== Western Division ===
Team	W	L	PCT.	GB
Denver Nuggets	65	19	.774	-
San Antonio Spurs	51	33	.607	14
Indiana Pacers	45	39	.536	20
Utah Stars	38	46	.452	27
San Diego Conquistadors	31	53	.369	34

== Awards and honors ==
1975 ABA All-Star Game selection (game played on January 28, 1975)

- Caldwell Jones
