= George Adams (basketball) =

American basketball player (born 1949)

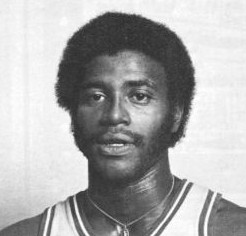
- Adams c. 1972

Personal information
- Born: May 15, 1949 (age 77) Kings Mountain, North Carolina, U.S.
- Listed height: 6 ft 5 in (1.96 m)
- Listed weight: 210 lb (95 kg)

Career information
- High school: Kings Mountain (Kings Mountain, North Carolina)
- College: Gardner–Webb (1968–1972)
- NBA draft: 1972: 3rd round, 46th overall pick
- Drafted by: Milwaukee Bucks
- Playing career: 1972–1975
- Position: Small forward
- Number: 12, 53

Career history
- 1972–1975: San Diego Conquistadors

Career highlights
- 2× NAIA All-American
- Stats at Basketball Reference

George Adams (born May 15, 1949) is an American former professional basketball player.

Born in Kings Mountain, North Carolina, Adams played college basketball for the Gardner–Webb Runnin' Bulldogs. He is the leading scorer and rebounder in program history. Adams played alongside Artis Gilmore during the 1968–69 season; Bulldogs head coach Eddie Holbrook considered Adams and Gilmore as "two of the hardest-working players [he] ever coached."

Adams was selected by the Milwaukee Bucks in the third round of the 1972 NBA draft. He spent his playing career with the San Diego Conquistadors of the American Basketball Association (ABA) where he was coached by Wilt Chamberlain and K. C. Jones.

Adams was inducted into the Gardner–Webb Athletics Hall of Fame in 1991. He was inducted into the Cleveland County Fellowship of Christian Athletes Sports Hall of Fame in 2009.

== ABA career statistics ==
Legend
GP	Games played	GS	Games started	MPG	Minutes per game
FG%	Field goal percentage	3P%	3-point field goal percentage	FT%	Free throw percentage
RPG	Rebounds per game	APG	Assists per game	SPG	Steals per game
BPG	Blocks per game	PPG	Points per game	**Bold**	Career high

=== Regular season ===
Year	Team	GP	GS	MPG	FG%	3P%	FT%	RPG	APG	SPG	BPG	PPG
1972–73	San Diego	60	–	14.4	.490	.286	.783	3.4	1.1	–	–	6.2
1973–74	San Diego	**80**	–	17.9	**.500**	.143	.757	4.3	1.6	**.6**	.3	7.3
1974–75	San Diego	75	–	**21.4**	.498	**.333**	**.849**	**4.4**	**1.7**	**.6**	**.5**	**9.3**
Career		215	–	18.2	.497	.235	.794	4.1	1.5	.6	.4	7.7
