= 1972–73 San Diego Conquistadors season =

- Head coach: K. C. Jones
- Arena: Peterson Gym

Results
- Record: 37–47 (.440)
- Place: Division: 4th (Western)
- Playoff finish: Division Semifinals (lost to the Stars 0–4)

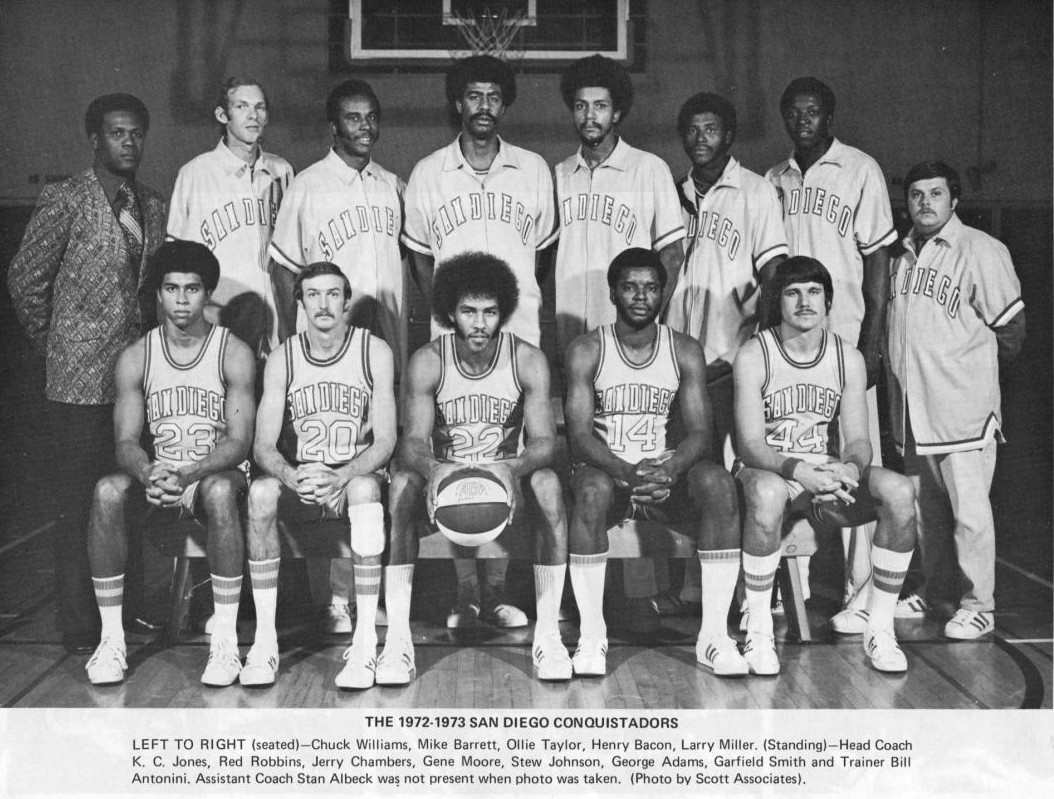
The inaugural 1972–73 San Diego Conquistadors basketball team

The 1972–73 San Diego Conquistadors season was the first season of the San Diego Conquistadors in the American Basketball Association. The Conquistadors were the first and only expansion team created for the ABA, who were made to make the league have 10 teams after the league previously lost both The Floridians and the Pittsburgh Condors franchises earlier in the season (with both teams ironically looking into San Diego as a relocation option earlier on), with Dr. Leonard Bloom being granted a team by the ABA for $1 million. However, a feud with Peter Graham, the proprietor of the San Diego Sports Arena, due to Graham being bitter for not being granted the San Diego ABA team meant that the Conquistadors would play their games in the 3,200 capacity Peterson Gym instead. Their first game ever played was held on a Friday night on October 13, 1972 versus the Denver Rockets, which they lost 100–109. The Conquistadors had a 16–26 first half of the season, with a ten-game losing streak in that half. In the second half, they went 21–21, with a nine-game losing streak in there, though they have a five-game winning streak near the end of the season that rose their win total from 25 to 30. The Q's (the official fan nickname of the Conquistadors) managed to get into the playoffs due to the Dallas Chaparrals losing to the Denver Rockets on March 25. They finished 9th in points scored with 109.0 points per game and 7th in points allowed with 113.2 points per game. They faced off against the Utah Stars in the semifinal round of the 1973 ABA Playoffs, but they were swept in four games in their first playoff run.

== ABA Expansion Draft ==
Nearly a month after the ABA completed its first dispersal draft decreasing the number of teams competing from 11 to 9 with the removal of "The Floridians" and Pittsburgh Condors franchises on July 13, 1972, the San Diego Conquistadors would officially be created with the ABA's first and only expansion draft on August 10 that year to expand the number of teams out to 10 teams instead. With this expansion draft, the Conquistadors were allowed two selections of players from the nine remaining inaugural teams of the ABA (the Carolina Cougars (formerly the Houston Mavericks), Dallas Chaparrals (also previously known as the Texas Chaparrals for one season), Denver Rockets, Indiana Pacers, Kentucky Colonels, the recently rebranded Memphis Tams (previously the New Orleans Buccaneers and then the Memphis Pros some time before the dispersal draft occurred in July), New York Nets (formerly the New Jersey Americans), Utah Stars (previously the Anaheim Amigos and Los Angeles Stars), and Virginia Squires (previously the Oakland Oaks and Washington Caps)) in what could be considered one whole round on the surface level, but was actually two rounds of drafting instead (though the Pacers did allow for the Conquistadors to obtain the draft rights of Dwight Jones that Indiana obtained from "The Floridians" back in the July 1972 dispersal draft as an alternative choice for San Diego instead). While this specific draft order isn't currently known, what is known is that Mike Barrett of the Virginia Squires was the #1 pick of that particular draft. Outside of that, the following players below are the selections made by the Conquistadors for their expansion draft.

- Round 1: Stew Johnson, Murray State University (Carolina Cougars)
- Round 1: George E. Johnson, Stephen F. Austin State University (Dallas Chaparrals)
- Round 1: Art Becker, Arizona State University (Denver Rockets)
- Round 1: George Peeples, University of Iowa (Indiana Pacers)
- Round 1: Les Hunter, Loyola University (Chicago) (Kentucky Colonels)
- Round 1: Don Sidle, University of Oklahoma (Memphis Tams)
- Round 1: Ollie Taylor, University of Houston (New York Nets)
- Round 1: Red Robbins, University of Tennessee (Utah Stars)
- Round 1: Mike Barrett, West Virginia Institute of Technology (Virginia Squires)
- Round 2: Larry Miller, University of North Carolina (Carolina Cougars)
- Round 2: Simmie Hill, West Texas State University (Dallas Chaparrals)
- Round 2: Chuck Williams, University of Colorado (Denver Rockets)
- Round 2: Draft rights to Dwight Jones, University of Houston (Indiana Pacers)
- Round 2: Lonnie Wright, Colorado State University (Kentucky Colonels)
- Round 2: Charlie Williams, Seattle University (Memphis Tams)
- Round 2: Gene Moore, Saint Louis University (New York Nets)
- Round 2: Mike Butler, Memphis State University (Utah Stars)
- Round 2: Craig Raymond, Brigham Young University (Virginia Squires)

== Roster ==
1972–73 San Diego Conquistadors roster
Players

Pos.	No.	Player	Height	Weight	DOB	From
SF	12	George Adams	6 ft 5 in (1.96 m)	210 lb (95 kg)	May 15, 1949	Gardner–Webb
SG	14	Henry Bacon	6 ft 3 in (1.91 m)	205 lb (93 kg)	July 5, 1948	Louisville
SG	20	Mike Barrett	6 ft 2 in (1.88 m)	155 lb (70 kg)	September 5, 1943	West Virginia Tech
SF	40	Jerry Chambers	6 ft 5 in (1.96 m)	185 lb (84 kg)	July 18, 1943	Utah
SF	54	Simmie Hill	6 ft 7 in (2.01 m)	233 lb (106 kg)	November 14, 1946	West Texas A&M
PF	13	Stew Johnson	6 ft 8 in (2.03 m)	220 lb (100 kg)	August 19, 1944	Murray State
SG	44	Larry Miller	6 ft 4 in (1.93 m)	190 lb (86 kg)	April 4, 1946	North Carolina
C	55	Gene Moore	6 ft 9 in (2.06 m)	225 lb (102 kg)	July 29, 1945	Saint Louis
C	52	Craig Raymond	6 ft 11 in (2.11 m)	235 lb (107 kg)	April 5, 1945	BYU
C	21	Red Robbins	6 ft 8 in (2.03 m)	190 lb (86 kg)	September 30, 1944	Tennessee
C	33, 42	Garfield Smith	6 ft 9 in (2.06 m)	235 lb (107 kg)	November 18, 1945	Eastern Kentucky
PF	53	Pete Smith	6 ft 6 in (1.98 m)	205 lb (93 kg)	1947	Valdosta State
SG	22	Ollie Taylor	6 ft 2 in (1.88 m)	194 lb (88 kg)	March 7, 1947	Houston
PG	23	Chuck Williams	6 ft 2 in (1.88 m)	175 lb (79 kg)	June 6, 1946	Colorado

Coaches
Head coach

K.C. Jones

Legend
- (DP) Unsigned draft pick
- (FA) Free agent
- (S) Suspended
- Injured

Roster

== Final standings ==
=== Western Division ===
Team	W	L	%	GB
Utah Stars	55	29	.655	-
Indiana Pacers	51	33	.607	4
Denver Rockets	47	37	.560	8
San Diego Conquistadors	30	54	.357	25
Dallas Chaparrals	28	56	.333	27

== ABA Playoffs ==
1973 playoff game log
ABA Western Division Semifinals: 0–4 (home: 0–2; road: 0–2)

Game	Date	Team	Score	High points	High rebounds	High assists	Location Attendance	Series
1	April 2	@ Utah	L 93–107	Stew Johnson (22)	Red Robbins (8)	Chuck Williams (8)	Salt Palace; 7,268	0–1
2	April 4	@ Utah	L 92–103	Chuck Williams (23)	Red Robbins (17)	Taylor, Williams (5)	Salt Palace; 7,271	0–2
3	April 7	Utah	L 96–97	Ollie Taylor (22)	Gene Moore (15)	Chuck Williams (5)	Peterson Gym; 1,729	0–3
4	April 8	Utah	L 98–120	Stew Johnson (19)	Gene Moore (10)	Stew Johnson (4)	Peterson Gym; 1,394	0–4

1973 schedule

== Awards and honors ==
1973 ABA All-Star Game selections (game played on February 6, 1973)

- Chuck Williams
- Stew Johnson
