= Jerry Chambers =

American basketball player (born 1943)

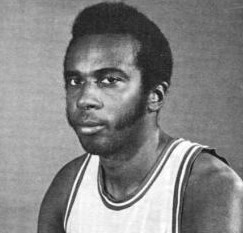

Personal information
- Born: July 18, 1943 (age 83) Washington, D.C., U.S.
- Listed height: 6 ft 5 in (1.96 m)
- Listed weight: 185 lb (84 kg)

Career information
- High school: Eastern (Washington, D.C.)
- College: Trinidad State (1962–1964); Utah (1964–1966)
- NBA draft: 1966: 1st round, 7th overall pick
- Drafted by: Los Angeles Lakers
- Playing career: 1966–1974
- Position: Small forward
- Number: 40, 44, 33

Career history
- 1966–1967: Los Angeles Lakers
- 1969–1970: Phoenix Suns
- 1970–1971: Atlanta Hawks
- 1971–1972: Buffalo Braves
- 1972–1973: San Diego Conquistadors
- 1973–1974: San Antonio Spurs

Career highlights
- NCAA Final Four Most Outstanding Player (1966); First-team All-WAC (1966); Second-team All-WAC (1965)

Career NBA and ABA statistics
- Points: 2,667 (8.3 ppg)
- Rebounds: 1,032 (3.2 rpg)
- Assists: 270 (0.8 apg)
- Stats at NBA.com
- Stats at Basketball Reference

Jerome Purcell Chambers (born July 18, 1943) is an American former professional basketball player. At 6'5" and 185 pounds, he played as a small forward.

== Early life ==
Chambers attended Spingarn High School in Washington, D.C., transferring to Eastern High School after being cut from the basketball team.

== College career ==
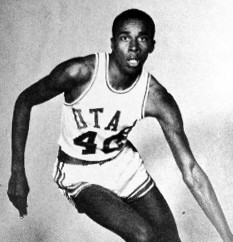
Chambers as a member of the Utah Utes, circa 1964–66

Chambers then attended the University of Utah from 1963 to 1966, winning the NCAA basketball tournament Most Outstanding Player award in 1966, despite his Runnin' Utes finishing fourth at the 1966 Final Four.

Chambers is the only player to ever earn MOP for a fourth-place team (the 3rd place game was eliminated in 1981). His 143 points in four games remains an NCAA Tournament record, with 70 of them coming in the Final Four—38 against eventual national champion Texas-Western, and 32 more in the third-place game against the Duke Blue Devils.

For his career at Utah, Chambers averaged a double-double, 24.6 points and 11.2 rebounds. As a senior in 1965–1966, he averaged 28.8 points and 11.6 rebounds. His 892 points in 1965–1966 remains second all time at Utah.

== Professional career ==
He played four professional seasons in the National Basketball Association as a member of the Los Angeles Lakers (1966–1967), Phoenix Suns (1969–1970), Atlanta Hawks (1970–1971) and Buffalo Braves (1971–1972). Chambers then played two seasons in the American Basketball Association as a member of the San Diego Conquistadors (1972–1973) and the San Antonio Spurs (1973–1974).

His best season was with San Diego under Coach K.C. Jones, when he averaged 11.9 points and 4.4 rebounds.

He missed the 1967–1968 and 1968–1969 seasons due to military service.

In 1968, he was involved in one of the most significant transactions in NBA history when he was traded by the Lakers, along with Archie Clark and Darrall Imhoff to the Philadelphia 76ers for Hall-of-Famer Wilt Chamberlain. Chambers never played for the 76ers, as they subsequently traded him to Phoenix.

Chambers retired with 2,667 combined NBA/ABA career points, averaging 8.3 points and 3.2 rebounds.

== Honors/Personal ==
Chambers and the 1966 Final Four Utah team were honored on March 4, 2017, at halftime of the Utah game against Stanford.

Chambers worked for the Los Angeles City Parks and Recreation department for many years.

== Career statistics ==
Legend
GP	Games played	GS	Games started	MPG	Minutes per game
FG%	Field goal percentage	3P%	3-point field goal percentage	FT%	Free throw percentage
RPG	Rebounds per game	APG	Assists per game	SPG	Steals per game
BPG	Blocks per game	PPG	Points per game	**Bold**	Career high

=== NBA/ABA ===
==== Regular season ====
Year	Team	GP	MPG	FG%	3P%	FT%	RPG	APG	SPG	BPG	PPG
1966–67	L.A Lakers	69	14.7	.452		.731	3.0	.6			7.5
1969–70	Phoenix	**79**	14.4	.430		.72	2.8	.7			8.3
1970–71	Atlanta	65	18.0	.451		.791	3.8	.9			8.9
1971–72	Buffalo	26	14.2	.433		.688	2.6	.9			6.8
1972–73	San Diego (ABA)	43	**20.6**	.425	**.200**	**.862**	**4.4**	**1.1**			**11.9**
1973–74	San Antonio (ABA)	38	15.2	**.456**	–	.750	2.7	1.1	.3	.1	5.9
Career (NBA)		239	15.4	.442		.747	3.1	.8			8.1
Career (ABA)		81	18.1	.435	.200	.831	3.6	1.1	.3	.1	9.1
Career (overall)		320	16.1	.440	.200	.774	3.2	.8	.3	.1	8.3

==== Playoffs ====
Year	Team	GP	MPG	FG%	FT%	RPG	APG	PPG
1967	L.A. Lakers	3	**14.7**	**.522**	**1.000**	**2.7**	.3	**10.3**
1970	Phoenix	**7**	10.4	.378	.625	2.4	**1.0**	4.7
1971	Atlanta	4	5.5	.333	.500	1.3	.0	1.9
Career		14	9.9	.420	.765	2.1	.6	5.1
