= Garfield Smith =

American basketball player

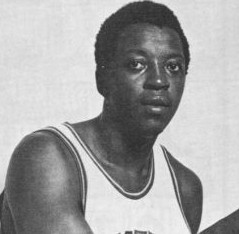

Personal information
- Born: November 18, 1945 (age 80) Campbellsville, Kentucky, U.S.
- Listed height: 6 ft 9 in (2.06 m)
- Listed weight: 235 lb (107 kg)

Career information
- High school: Campbellsville (Campbellsville, Kentucky)
- College: Eastern Kentucky (1965–1968)
- NBA draft: 1968: 3rd round, 32nd overall pick
- Drafted by: Boston Celtics
- Position: Center / power forward
- Number: 33, 42

Career history
- 1970–1972: Boston Celtics
- 1972–1973: San Diego Conquistadors
- Stats at NBA.com
- Stats at Basketball Reference

Garfield Smith (born November 18, 1945) is an American former professional basketball player who played in the National Basketball Association (NBA) and American Basketball Association (ABA). He was drafted with the tenth pick in the third round of the 1968 NBA draft by the Boston Celtics. In two seasons in the NBA, Smith averaged 2.7 points per game and 2.1 rebounds per game. Smith also played one season in the ABA for the San Diego Conquistadors where he averaged 3.7 points per game and 4.3 rebounds per game.

== Career statistics ==
Legend
GP	Games played	GS	Games started	MPG	Minutes per game
FG%	Field goal percentage	3P%	3-point field goal percentage	FT%	Free throw percentage
RPG	Rebounds per game	APG	Assists per game	SPG	Steals per game
BPG	Blocks per game	PPG	Points per game	**Bold**	Career high

=== NBA/ABA ===
==== Regular season ====
Year	Team	GP	MPG	FG%	3P%	FT%	RPG	APG	PPG
1970–71	Boston (NBA)	37	7.6	.362		**.393**	2.6	.2	2.9
1971–72	Boston (NBA)	26	5.2	.424		.194	1.4	.3	2.4
1972–73	San Diego (ABA)	**71**	**14.9**	**.475**	–	.301	**4.3**	**.5**	**3.7**
Career (NBA)		63	6.6	.385		.322	2.1	.3	2.7
Career (overall)		134	11.0	.437	–	.311	3.3	.4	3.2

==== Playoffs ====
Year	Team	GP	MPG	FG%	3P%	FT%	RPG	APG	PPG
1972	Boston (NBA)	**4**	1.5	.200		.000	.3	.0	.5
1973	San Diego (ABA)	**4**	**15.8**	**.294**	–	**.286**	**5.3**	**.3**	**3.0**
Career (overall)		8	8.6	.273	–	.200	2.8	.1	1.8
