= Golden Hall (arena) =

Indoor arena in San Diego, California

- Location: 9 Civic Center Plz San Diego, CA 92101
- Owner: City of San Diego
- Operator: City of San Diego
- Capacity: 3,200 (basketball)

Construction
- Opened: 1964

Tenant
- San Diego Conquistadors (ABA) (1973–1974)

Golden Hall is a multipurpose indoor arena located in San Diego, California. It was built in 1964. Golden Hall is located within the San Diego Concourse complex. From 2020 to 2024 Golden Hall was primarily utilized as a temporary homeless shelter before being closed for residency.

== History ==
The building was named after Morley H. Golden, a San Diego developer known for his civic involvement.

=== Music ===
(2018) Roof of Golden Hall. Seen from the 9th floor of the Civic Center Concourse Parkade. Also visible are the Civic Center Theatre, San Diego Central Jail, and the Justice Hall.

Built in 1964 and opened in 1965, Golden Hall has been the host of many concerts, events and athletics. Legendary musical artists Bob Dylan, the Rolling Stones, Ozzy Osbourne, the Grateful Dead, Boston, Pink Floyd and B.B. King have all played at the venue.

=== San Diego Conquistadors ===
In the 1973–74 basketball season, Golden Hall was home to the San Diego Conquistadors of the American Basketball Association. The Conquistadors, nicknamed the "Qs" were coached by Basketball Hall of Fame player Wilt Chamberlain during the 1973–74 season. The team had a record of 37–47, finishing in fourth place in the ABA Western Division and losing to the Utah Stars in the playoffs.

The Qs started as an ABA expansion franchise in 1972–73 and played at Peterson Gym on the campus of San Diego State University during their initial season. Owner Leonard Bloom had hoped to move his new team into the 14,000 seat San Diego Sports Arena, but Bloom had a feud with Arena proprietor Peter Graham, as Graham had attempted to secure the ABA franchise himself. This forced the Qs to play at 3,200-seat Golden Hall. After signing 7-foot-1-inch-tall Chamberlain to serve as a player-coach, the team used the advertising slogan "Tallest Coach in the Smallest Arena." Rookie Caldwell Jones, ABA All-Star Red Robbins, ABA All-Star Stew Johnson and former NBA All-Star Flynn Robinson were notable players on the Q's roster that season.

Bloom lured Chamberlain from the National Basketball Association's Los Angeles Lakers for a reported $600,000 and then attempted to build the team a new arena. Ultimately, Chamberlain was not allowed to be a player for San Diego, as the Lakers sued for violation of contract, leaving Chamberlain as Head Coach only. Then, on November 7, 1973, Bloom's 20,000 seat $200 million arena in Chula Vista narrowly failed in a special referendum. Chamberlain reportedly had refused to campaign for the arena project. "If I have to go there, they can't want it very much," he said.

After the arena referendum failed, the ABA directed Bloom to look at moving the team to Los Angeles. However, Bloom and Graham then reached agreement to move the team from Golden Hall. Following the 1973–74 season, the Qs finally moved to the San Diego Sports Arena. Chamberlain retired after his one season as the Qs’ coach and did not move with the team. The team struggled and had low attendance at the new arena. Following the 1974–75 season, Bloom sold the team to Frank Goldberg. After changing their name to the San Diego Sails and starting the 1975–76 season with a 3–8 record, the franchise folded.

=== Other uses ===
On election night Golden Hall serves as election headquarters, dubbed Election Central. One unique San Diego tradition was the gathering of news media and candidates at Golden Hall. This dated back to 1978, when the San Diego County Registrar of Voters would print vote updates to hand to journalists and members of the public at the convention center. Most election night parties are within walking distance and television stations broadcast live coverage from the center. Due to the COVID-19 pandemic and restrictions on gathering, the last use as Election Central was the 2020 California primary election, and the county stated it would not return in 2022 due to the increase in mail-in ballots which lessen the finality of election night results, and information availability on the county's web site.

The upper floor of Golden Hall was used for temporary homeless housing beginning in May 2019. During the COVID-19 pandemic, the entire hall was converted into a homeless shelter. It currently provides over one-third of San Diego's available temporary shelter beds, with over 500 residents. In March 2023, the city announced that Golden Hall would be closed, as the structure was never intended for long term habitation. No date was scheduled, as replacement housing needed to be arranged. The facility was closed for housing purposes in 2024.

In January 2026, the city of San Diego and the San Diego Community College District were in talks about the purchase of Golden Hall by the community college district for repurposing the facility and its land parcel.
