= 1975–76 San Diego Sails season =

Aborted ABA basketball team season

- Head coach: Bill Musselman
- Arena: San Diego Sports Arena

Results
- Record: 3–8 (.273)
- Place: Division: n/a (Western); Conference: n/a
- Playoff finish: Folded; could not make the 1976 ABA Playoffs
- Radio: KSDO

The 1975-76 American Basketball Association season saw the San Diego Sails fold due to weak home attendance and other financial pressures; the team folded 11 games into the season. They would only win three game out of the eleven total games played during their aborted season: the games won in late 1975 occurred on October 25 against the Utah Stars, November 2 against the San Antonio Spurs, and November 5 as their next game against the Virginia Squires (with two of those teams also going defunct later on in the season as well). These 11 games played would count as the fourth and final season played for the San Diego-based franchise when including their previous seasons under the Conquistadors name, as well as the only official games played by the team under the short-lived Sails name. The reason for the team folding related to new team owner Frank Goldberg finding out early on that the Sails franchise would not make it as an NBA team in the upcoming ABA-NBA merger due primarily to Los Angeles Lakers owner Jack Kent Cooke not wanting another team nearby his area to share TV revenue with. (Ironically, the NBA would get a team in San Diego to join the NBA a few years later with the Buffalo Braves moving to San Diego to become the San Diego Clippers before later becoming the inner city rivaling Los Angeles Clippers to go alongside the Lakers.) Incidentally, the odd number of games played by the Sails would later help constitute in the Virginia Squires only having 83 games played that season instead of the 84 games that every other team that survived that final ABA season in 1976 had to their names going forward there (on the day they folded operations, they were scheduled to play a game against the Indiana Pacers at home, though the Sails wouldn't bother playing that game before officially folding the team).

== Offseason ==
=== ABA Draft ===
Round	Pick	Player	Position(s)	Nationality	College
1	4	Kevin Grevey	SG/SG	United States	Kentucky
2	14	Cornelius Cash	PF	United States	Bowling Green
3	24	Bob Gross	SF	United States	Long Beach State
4	34	Pete Trgovich	G	United States	UCLA
5	44	Clark "Biff" Burrell	PG/SG	United States	USC
6	54	Louis Dunbar	SF	United States	Houston
7	64	Jerome Anderson	SG	United States	West Virginia
8	74	Mack Coleman	PF	United States	Houston Baptist

All of these selections were made back when the Sails were initially going by their original San Diego Conquistadors name.

=== Preseason transactions ===
- June 1975: Former Denver Rockets/Nuggets owner Frank Goldberg purchases the team
- June 1975: Irv Kaze named general manager
- June 1975: Alex Groza named director of player personnel
- June 28, 1974: Bill Musselman hired as head coach
- August 20, 1975: Sails purchase Mark Olberding from the San Antonio Spurs
- October 21, 1975: Sails trade a second-round draft choice and cash to the Spirits of St. Louis for Dave Robisch

=== Preseason exhibition games ===
Like most ABA teams, the Sails took the court in preseason exhibition action against the NBA. However, unlike most ABA teams, the Sails only played one such game prior to the 1975–76 season. The Sails began their preseason play on October 15, 1975, as they hosted the Portland Trail Blazers. The Sails' Caldwell Jones led all scorers with 27 points and also had 27 rebounds while holding Portland's Bill Walton to 6 points and 11 rebounds, but Portland won 98–85. Despite the Sails' loss the ABA won 31 games against the NBA in that preseason, compared to 17 wins for the NBA.

== Roster ==
1975–76 San Diego Sails roster
Players

Pos.	No.	Player	Height	Weight	DOB	From
PF	8	Lee Davis	6 ft 8 in (2.03 m)	235 lb (107 kg)	October 11, 1945	NC State
PG	6	Tom Inglesby	6 ft 3 in (1.91 m)	180 lb (82 kg)	February 12, 1951	Villanova
PF	2	Stew Johnson	6 ft 8 in (2.03 m)	220 lb (100 kg)	August 19, 1944	Murray State
C	3	Caldwell Jones	6 ft 11 in (2.11 m)	217 lb (98 kg)	August 4, 1950	Albany State
PG	43	Kevin Joyce	6 ft 3 in (1.91 m)	190 lb (86 kg)	June 27, 1951	South Carolina
PG	10	Bo Lamar	6 ft 1 in (1.85 m)	180 lb (82 kg)	April 7, 1951	Louisiana
SG	15	Pat McFarland	6 ft 5 in (1.96 m)	185 lb (84 kg)	December 7, 1951	Saint Joseph's
SF	53	Mark Olberding	6 ft 8 in (2.03 m)	225 lb (102 kg)	April 21, 1956	Minnesota
PF	12	Dave Robisch	6 ft 10 in (2.08 m)	235 lb (107 kg)	December 22, 1949	Kansas
SG	21	Bob Warren	6 ft 5 in (1.96 m)	190 lb (86 kg)	July 17, 1946	Vanderbilt
PF	22	Joby Wright	6 ft 8 in (2.03 m)	220 lb (100 kg)	September 5, 1950	Indiana

Coaches

Head coach

- Bill Musselman

Legend

- **(C)** Team captain
- Injured

=== Season standings ===
Team	W	L	PCT.	GB
Denver Nuggets *	60	24	.714	—
**New York Nets** *	55	29	.655	5
San Antonio Spurs *	50	34	.595	10
Kentucky Colonels *	46	38	.548	14
Indiana Pacers *	39	45	.464	21
Spirits of St. Louis	35	49	.417	25
Virginia Squires †	15	68	.181	44
San Diego Sails †	3	8	.273	—
Utah Stars †	4	12	.250	—
Baltimore Claws †	0	0	.000	—

Asterisk (*) denotes playoff team
† did not survive the end of the season.
Bold – ABA champions

=== Game log ===
1975–76 game log
October

Game	Date	Team	Score	High points	High rebounds	High assists	Location Attendance	Record
1	October 24	Denver Nuggets	L 106–120	Pat McFarland (29)	Caldwell Jones (9)	Bo Lamar (11)	San Diego Sports Arena; 3,060	0–1
2	October 25	@ Utah Stars	W 99–97	Bo Lamar (29)	Caldwell Jones (17)	Pat McFarland (5)	The Salt Palace; 5,525	1–1
3	October 26	@ Spirits of St. Louis	L 85–101	Caldwell Jones (23)	Caldwell Jones (16)	Bo Lamar, Pat McFarland (7)	St. Louis Arena; 1,144	1–2
4	October 29	@ Indiana Pacers	L 100–105	Caldwell Jones (25)	Mark Olberding (17)	Bo Lamar (8)	Market Square Arena; 5,007	1–3
5	October 30	@ San Antonio Spurs	L 100–102	Bo Lamar (26)	Caldwell Jones, Dave Robisch (15)	Bo Lamar (8)	HemisFair Arena; 4,147	1–4

November

Game	Date	Team	Score	High points	High rebounds	High assists	Location Attendance	Record
6	November 1	Virginia Squires	L 105–109	Mark Olberding (26)	Caldwell Jones (18)	Kevin Joyce (9)	San Diego Sports Arena; 2,396	1–5
7	November 2	San Antonio Spurs	W 105–102	Bob Warren (20)	Dave Robisch (13)	Mark Olberding (6)	San Diego Sports Arena; 1,670	2–5
8	November 5	@ Virginia Squires	W 118–104	Bob Warren (20)	Caldwell Jones (12)	Kevin Joyce (6)	Norfolk Scope; 4,334	3–5
9	November 7	N Kentucky Colonels	L 99–104	Dave Robisch (31)	Caldwell Jones (16)	Kevin Joyce (8)	Cincinnati Riverfront Coliseum; 11,887	3–6
10	November 8	@ San Antonio Spurs	L 76–99	Bob Warren (17)	Dave Robisch (22)	Kevin Joyce (4)	HemisFair Arena; 7,812	3–7
11	November 9	@ Spirits of St. Louis	L 92–95	Mark Olberding (21)	Dave Robisch (14)	Kevin Joyce (5)	St. Louis Arena; 1,194	3–8
—	November 12	Indiana Pacers	**Cancelled (San Diego Sails folded operations that day before playing their game.)**					

1975–76 season schedule

=== Month by Month ===
==== October 1975 ====
The ABA opened its 1975–76 season on October 24, 1975, and on that night the Sails hosted the Denver Nuggets before 3,060 fans. Denver's Ralph Simpson led all scorers with 30 points and Denver won 120–108. The next night the Sails began a long road swing by earning their first win in franchise history with a road victory against the Utah Stars. Bo Lamar led all scorers with 29 points and 5,525 fans saw the Sails prevail 99–97. The very next night the Sails lost on the road against the Spirits of St. Louis; a meager crowd of 1,144 saw Maurice Lucas lead all scorers with 25 as the Spirits won 101–85. On October 29 the Sails lost on the Indiana Pacers home court 105–100; Caldwell Jones, Billy Knight and Billy Keller each scored 25 before 5,007 fans. The Sails closed the month with a close road loss to the San Antonio Spurs 102–100 as 4,147 saw James Silas lead all scorers with 29. The Sails had only one home game in October and finished the month with a record of 1–4.

==== November 1975 ====
On November 1 the Sails finally returned home, losing to the Virginia Squires 109–105 before 2,396 fans; Ticky Burden led all scorers with 45. The next night at home the Sails defeated the San Antonio Spurs 105–102; James Silas had 28 for San Antonio to lead all scorers and attendance was only 1,670. On November 5 the Sails returned to the road for a rematch with the Virginia Squires which the Sails won 118-104 despite Ticky Burden's 40 points for the Squires in Mack Calvin's debut as Virginia's head coach before 4,334 fans. On November 7 the Sails faced the Kentucky Colonels in Cincinnati, Ohio; Dave Robisch scored 31 for San Diego but the Colonels won 104–99 before 11,887 fans. The next night the Sails lost another road game, this time to the San Antonio Spurs 99–76; attendance was 7,812. The following night in St. Louis, unbeknownst to anyone at the time, the Sails played the final game in the franchise's history. Despite San Diego's Mark Olberding leading all scorers with 21 points the Spirits of St. Louis defeated the San Diego Sails 95–92 before 1,194 fans.

On November 12, 1975, the ABA announced that it was folding the San Diego Sails franchise. The Sails were scheduled to host the Indiana Pacers on that day but the game was not played.

The Sails had only played three home games (out of 11) and in those games attendance dropped from 3,060 to 2,396 to 1,670. In that time owner Frank Goldberg, knowing that the ABA-NBA merger was likely at the end of the season, learned that Los Angeles Lakers owner Jack Kent Cooke would vigorously oppose the Sails' entry into the NBA, as he wanted no further competition in the southern California market (and the Cooke-owned cable television system owned the rights to Lakers' telecasts).

The Sails' roster was dispersed:

- Dave Robisch to the Indiana Pacers
- Stew Johnson to the San Antonio Spurs
- Mark Olberding to the San Antonio Spurs
- Kevin Joyce to the Kentucky Colonels
- Caldwell Jones to the Kentucky Colonels
- Coach Bill Musselman to the Virginia Squires

== Player statistics ==
=== Legend ===
- GP: Games played
- GS: Games started
- MPG: Minutes per game
- FG%: Field goal percentage
- 3FG%: 3-point field goal percentage
- FT%: Free throw percentage
- RPG: Rebounds per game
- APG: Assists per game
- SPG: Steals per game
- BPG: Blocks per game
- PPG: Points per game

=== Season ===
Player	GP	GS	MPG	FG%	3FG%	FT%	RPG	APG	SPG	BPG	PPG

=== Draft and preseason signings ===
==== Draft picks ====
- Kevin Grevey, University of Kentucky (signed with Washington Bullets of the NBA)
- Bob Gross, California State University, Long Beach (signed with Portland Trail Blazers of the NBA)

==== Signings ====
- June 28, 1974: Bill Musselman hired as head coach
- August 20, 1975: Sails purchase Mark Olberding from the San Antonio Spurs

==== Trades ====
- October 21, 1975: Sails trade a second-round draft choice and cash to the Spirits of St. Louis for Dave Robisch
