= Scott English (basketball) =

American basketball player (born 1950)

Personal information
- Born: October 20, 1950 (age 76) Evanston, Illinois, U.S.
- Listed height: 6 ft 6 in (1.98 m)
- Listed weight: 205 lb (93 kg)

Career information
- College: UTEP (1969–1972)
- NBA draft: 1972: 3rd round, 33rd overall pick
- Drafted by: Phoenix Suns
- Position: Small forward
- Number: 14, 9

Career history
- 1972–1973: Phoenix Suns
- 1973: Virginia Squires
- 1974–1975: San Diego Conquistadors
- Stats at NBA.com
- Stats at Basketball Reference

Scott Garrison English (born October 20, 1950) is an American former professional basketball small forward who played in the National Basketball Association (NBA) and the American Basketball Association (ABA). Born in Evanston, Illinois, he attended Chatsworth High School, in Los Angeles, where he starred in the high jump in track and field, clearing 6'7" his senior year.

English was an All-American high jumper for the UTEP Miners track and field team, placing 4th in that event at the 1969 NCAA indoor track and field championships.

While at UTEP, he was selected during the third round of the 1972 NBA draft by the Phoenix Suns. He played for the Suns during the 1972–73 season. He spent the next two seasons in the ABA as a member of the Virginia Squires (1973–74) and the San Diego Conquistadors (1974–75).

== Career statistics ==
Legend
GP	Games played	GS	Games started	MPG	Minutes per game
FG%	Field goal percentage	3P%	3-point field goal percentage	FT%	Free throw percentage
RPG	Rebounds per game	APG	Assists per game	SPG	Steals per game
BPG	Blocks per game	PPG	Points per game	**Bold**	Career high

=== NBA/ABA ===
==== Regular season ====
Year	Team	GP	MPG	FG%	3P%	FT%	RPG	APG	SPG	BPG	PPG
1972–73	Phoenix (NBA)	29	6.8	.387		.724	1.5	.5			3.2
1973–74	Virginia (ABA)	5	9.6	.200	–	**1.000**	3.2	.8	.6	.0	2.0
1974–75	San Diego (ABA)	**71**	**18.5**	**.425**	**.100**	.775	**5.1**	**1.2**	**.7**	**.3**	**6.9**
Career (ABA)		76	17.9	.418	.100	.785	5.0	1.2	.7	.3	6.6
Career (overall)		105	14.9	.414	.100	.770	4.0	1.0	.7	.3	5.6
