= Charles Jones (basketball, born 1957) =

American basketball player

Personal information
- Born: April 3, 1957 (age 69) McGehee, Arkansas, U.S.
- Listed height: 6 ft 9 in (2.06 m)
- Listed weight: 215 lb (98 kg)

Career information
- High school: Desha Central (Rohwer, Arkansas)
- College: Albany State (1975–1979)
- NBA draft: 1979: 8th round, 165th overall pick
- Drafted by: Phoenix Suns
- Playing career: 1979–1998
- Position: Power forward / center
- Number: 23, 13, 27

Career history
- 1979–1980: Maine Lumberjacks
- 1980–1981: Nice BC
- 1981–1982: S. Benedetto Gorizia
- 1982–1983: Maine Lumberjacks
- 1983–1984: Bay State Bombardiers
- 1984: Philadelphia 76ers
- 1984: Chicago Bulls
- 1984–1985: Tampa Bay Thrillers
- 1985–1993: Washington Bullets
- 1994: Detroit Pistons
- 1995–1998: Houston Rockets

Career highlights
- NBA champion (1995); All-CBA Second Team (1984); 2× CBA All-Defensive First Team (1983, 1984); CBA All-Defensive Second Team (1985); 3× CBA blocks leader (1980, 1983, 1984)

Career NBA statistics
- Points: 1,826 (2.5 ppg)
- Rebounds: 3,253 (4.5 rpg)
- Blocks: 1,134 (1.6 bpg)
- Stats at NBA.com
- Stats at Basketball Reference

Charles "Gadget" Jones (born April 3, 1957) is an American former professional basketball player. Although a raw offensive player, he was known for his shot-blocking ability.

== Basketball career ==
A 6'9" forward–center from Albany State University, Jones was selected 165th overall in the 1979 NBA draft by the Phoenix Suns, arriving in the league four years later. He played in 15 seasons with five teams: the Philadelphia 76ers, the Chicago Bulls, the Washington Bullets, the Detroit Pistons and the Houston Rockets.

Jones played in the Continental Basketball Association (CBA) for the Maine Lumberjacks during the 1979–80 and 1982–83 seasons, Bay State Bombardiers during the 1983–84 season and the Tampa Bay Thrillers during the 1984–85 season. He was selected to the All-CBA Second Team in 1984, All-Defensive First Team in 1983 and 1984, and All-Defensive Second Team in 1985.

Jones won an NBA Championship with the Rockets in 1995, appearing in 19 out of 22 postseason contests. He retired three seasons later with career averages of 2.5 points, 4.5 rebounds, and 1.6 blocks per game. His biggest scoring output came on January 8, 1986: 17 points against the team who drafted him, the Suns. Four years later, against the Orlando Magic, Jones blocked a career-best 10 shots, in 49 minutes.

Jones played four minutes in his final NBA game on May 3, 1998; Jones, having done so aged 41 years and 30 days, stands as the 11th oldest player in NBA history.

== Personal life ==
Jones' brothers, Caldwell, Wil and Major Jones, all played at Albany State and in the NBA.

== NBA career statistics ==
Legend
GP	Games played	GS	Games started	MPG	Minutes per game
FG%	Field goal percentage	3P%	3-point field goal percentage	FT%	Free throw percentage
RPG	Rebounds per game	APG	Assists per game	SPG	Steals per game
BPG	Blocks per game	PPG	Points per game	**Bold**	Career high
†	Won an NBA championship

=== Regular season ===
Year	Team	GP	GS	MPG	FG%	3P%	FT%	RPG	APG	SPG	BPG	PPG
1983–84	Philadelphia	1	0	3.0	.000	–	.250	.0	.0	.0	.0	1.0
1984–85	Chicago	3	0	9.7	.500	–	.667	2.0	.3	.0	1.7	2.7
1984–85	Washington	28	4	22.8	.528	–	.692	**6.4**	.9	**.8**	**2.6**	**5.9**
1985–86	Washington	**81**	58	19.9	.508	.000	.628	4.0	.9	.7	1.6	3.9
1986–87	Washington	79	64	20.4	.474	.000	.632	4.5	1.0	**.8**	2.1	3.6
1987–88	Washington	69	49	19.0	.407	.000	**.707**	4.7	.9	**.8**	1.6	2.9
1988–89	Washington	53	45	21.8	.480	.000	.640	4.8	.8	.7	1.4	2.6
1989–90	Washington	**81**	**81**	**27.7**	.508	–	.648	6.2	**1.7**	.6	2.4	3.2
1990–91	Washington	62	54	24.2	.540	–	.580	5.8	.8	**.8**	2.0	2.6
1991–92	Washington	75	32	18.2	.367	–	.500	4.2	.8	.6	1.2	1.1
1992–93	Washington	67	21	18.0	.524	.000	.579	4.1	.6	.6	1.1	1.3
1993–94	Detroit	42	0	20.9	.462	.000	.559	5.6	.7	.3	1.0	2.2
1994–95†	Houston	3	0	12.0	.333	–	.500	2.3	.0	.0	.3	1.0
1995–96	Houston	46	0	6.5	.316	–	.308	1.6	.3	.1	.5	.3
1996–97	Houston	12	0	7.8	.400	–	–	1.3	.3	.2	.3	.3
1997–98	Houston	24	0	5.3	**.700**	–	.500	1.0	.2	.0	.3	.6
Career		726	480	19.4	.480	.000	.618	4.5	.9	.6	1.6	2.5

=== Playoffs ===
Year	Team	GP	GS	MPG	FG%	3P%	FT%	RPG	APG	SPG	BPG	PPG
1985	Washington	4	0	**27.5**	.526	–	.563	**6.5**	.8	**.8**	**2.5**	**7.3**
1986	Washington	5	**5**	14.4	.364	–	**1.000**	1.8	.6	.4	.4	2.4
1987	Washington	3	3	18.7	**.600**	–	–	2.7	**1.0**	.7	1.7	2.0
1988	Washington	5	1	19.0	.200	–	.500	3.4	.4	.4	.8	.6
1995†	Houston	**19**	0	12.5	.385	.000	.333	2.3	.0	.2	.5	.7
1996	Houston	3	0	2.7	.000	–	–	.3	.0	.0	.0	.0
1997	Houston	1	0	2.0	–	–	–	.0	**1.0**	.0	.0	.0
1998	Houston	4	0	2.8	–	–	**1.000**	.8	.3	.0	.0	.5
Career		44	9	13.4	.426	.000	.556	2.5	.3	.3	.7	1.5

== See also ==
- List of National Basketball Association players with most blocks in a game
- List of oldest and youngest National Basketball Association players
