= Caldwell Jones =

American basketball player (1950–2014)

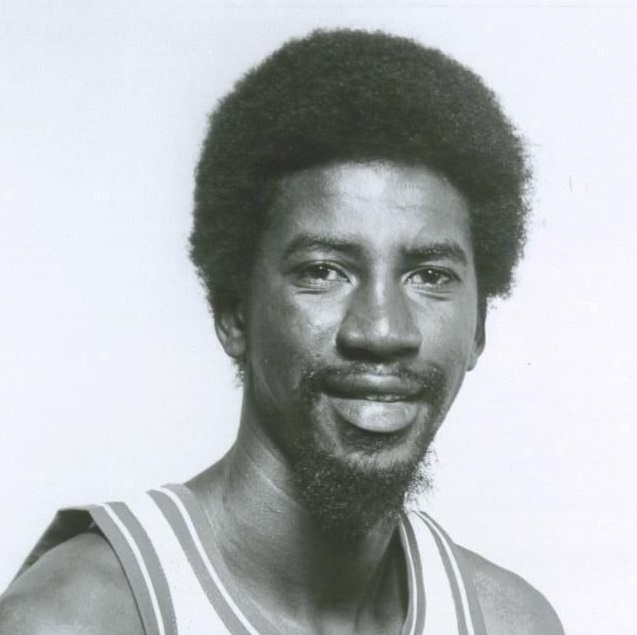

Personal information
- Born: August 4, 1950 McGehee, Arkansas, U.S.
- Died: September 21, 2014 (aged 64) Stockbridge, Georgia, U.S.
- Listed height: 6 ft 11 in (2.11 m)
- Listed weight: 217 lb (98 kg)

Career information
- High school: Desha Central (Rohwer, Arkansas)
- College: Albany State (1969–1973)
- NBA draft: 1973: 2nd round, 32nd overall pick
- Drafted by: Philadelphia 76ers
- Playing career: 1973–1990
- Position: Center / power forward
- Number: 3, 11, 27, 39
- Coaching career: 2001–2002

Career history

Playing
- 1973–1975: San Diego Conquistadors / Sails
- 1975: Kentucky Colonels
- 1975–1976: Spirits of St. Louis
- 1976–1982: Philadelphia 76ers
- 1982–1984: Houston Rockets
- 1984–1985: Chicago Bulls
- 1985–1989: Portland Trail Blazers
- 1989–1990: San Antonio Spurs

Career highlights
- ABA All-Star (1975); 2× NBA All-Defensive First Team (1981, 1982); 2× ABA blocks leader (1974, 1975)

Career ABA and NBA statistics
- Points: 10,241 (7.9 ppg)
- Rebounds: 10,685 (8.2 rpg)
- Blocks: 2,297 (1.8 bpg)
- Stats at NBA.com
- Stats at Basketball Reference

Caldwell "Pops" Jones Jr. (August 4, 1950 – September 21, 2014) was an American professional basketball player.

Jones was drafted out of Albany State College by the Philadelphia 76ers with the 32nd pick in the 1973 NBA draft. He played three seasons in the American Basketball Association (ABA) and 14 seasons in the National Basketball Association (NBA), most extensively with the 76ers.

Jones led the ABA in blocked shots in the 1973–74 season, and played in the 1975 ABA All-Star Game. He shares (with Julius Keye) the ABA's all-time record for blocked shots in a game with 12.

Jones' brothers, Charles, Wil and Major all played at Albany State and in the NBA.

Jones played his final season at the age of 39, then the fifth-oldest NBA player ever. He finished with 10,241 points in 1,299 games in the NBA and ABA.

== Playing career ==
Jones began his career in 1973–74 with the ABA's San Diego Conquistadors, coached by Wilt Chamberlain. In the 1974 ABA Western Division Tiebreaker Game, Jones helped San Diego to a 131–111 win over the Denver Rockets, posting a stat line of 16 points, 10 rebounds, 6 assists, and 6 blocks. The following round, Jones and San Diego were eliminated by the Utah Stars in a six-game series, which saw Jones grab a game leading 22 rebounds, along with scoring 10 points, in a Game 6 loss. During three ABA seasons (including short stints with the Kentucky Colonels and the Spirits of St. Louis), Jones averaged 15.8 points, hitting a career high of 19.5 points per game in 1974–75. "I was a gunner", he later told the Dallas Morning News. "Every time I caught the ball I shot it."

With the ABA–NBA merger prior to the 1976–77 season, Jones landed with Philadelphia. His days as a scorer were over. "We had so much talent on those 76ers teams that [Coach] Gene Shue said all he wanted his centers to do was play defense and rebound. I had no argument with that", Jones later told the Portland Oregonian..."We were winning and that's the name of the game. And it's kept me around for 16 years."

In Jones' first season with Philadelphia, the team was particularly explosive. Erving (21.6 points per game), George McGinnis (21.4 points per game), Doug Collins (18.3 points per game), and Lloyd B. Free (later World B. Free) (16.3 points per game) propelled the squad to a 50–32 regular season record and a 1977 NBA Finals meeting with the Portland Trail Blazers. Jumping out to a two-game lead, the 76ers appeared to be headed for the title, but the Trail Blazers rallied for a dramatic 4–2 Finals win. For the season, Jones averaged 6.0 points and 8.1 rebounds and finished sixth on the team in minutes played. He also ranked fifth in the league in blocked shots with 200.

Philadelphia won the Atlantic Division again in 1977–78 but lost to the Washington Bullets in the Eastern Conference Finals. Jones averaged 5.4 points (ninth on the team) and 7.0 rebounds (third). That season marked the emergence of Darryl Dawkins, with whom Jones shared minutes in the pivot during the following seasons.

In 1978–79 the 76ers slipped a bit, finishing second in the Atlantic Division to Washington and losing to the San Antonio Spurs in the conference semifinals. That season, on February 18, 1979, Jones grabbed a career high 27 rebounds, along with scoring 19 points during a 110–107 win over the Milwaukee Bucks. Jones averaged 9.3 points (his highest average at Philadelphia) and 9.6 rebounds and was ninth in the league in blocks with 157.

The 76ers reached the 1980 NBA Finals. Erving scored 26.9 points per game in the season, and Jones was a defensive force, pulling down 11.9 rebounds per game, fourth in the league, and blocking 162 shots, seventh in the league. Although Philadelphia finished behind the Boston Celtics in the regular season, the 76ers tore through the playoffs, advancing past the Celtics in the Eastern Conference Finals where Jones led the 76ers to a Game 2 win with 22 points and 11 rebounds, before coming up short against the Los Angeles Lakers in the Finals.

Jones and teammate Bobby Jones (no relation) were NBA All-Defensive First Team selections for the next two seasons, and the 76ers made another trip to the NBA Finals and battled the Lakers in 1982. Philadelphia again fell in six games. After the season, the 76ers sent Jones to the Houston Rockets in a deal that brought Moses Malone to Philadelphia. The 76ers won the championship the following season.

Jones played two seasons in Houston (joining his brother Major Jones on the Rockets' squad), one in Chicago, four in Portland, where he would play meaningful playoff minutes despite being in his late 30s, most notably at age 37 starting every game of Portland's first round loss to Houston during the 1987 NBA Playoffs while averaging 7.8 rebounds per game (second best on the Trail Blazers, only behind Steve Johnson), and one final season in San Antonio. Primarily as a reserve, he was called upon to spell the starting center, grab some rebounds, and play some defense. "I'm like a spare tire on the Cadillac", he told USA Today in the twilight of his career. "I'm just sitting around in the trunk, waiting to get put on the car if one of the fancy tires blows out".

"Everybody likes to look at the glorified part of the game, like scoring points", Jones told USA Today in 1990. "But there is a lot more to the game. I look at myself like an offensive lineman. Someone has to open the holes for the 1,000-yard rushers."

"What do I think of Caldwell Jones? When he retires, I think they should have a farewell tour for him", Larry Brown, Jones's coach with the San Antonio Spurs, told USA Today.

== Coaching career ==
On October 4, 2001, Jones was announced as an assistant coach for the Portland Trail Blazers. He joined the staff of head coach Maurice Cheeks who was his teammate on the Philadelphia 76ers. His contract was not renewed for the 2002–03 season.

== Career statistics ==
Legend
GP	Games played	GS	Games started	MPG	Minutes per game
FG%	Field goal percentage	3P%	3-point field goal percentage	FT%	Free throw percentage
RPG	Rebounds per game	APG	Assists per game	SPG	Steals per game
BPG	Blocks per game	PPG	Points per game	**Bold**	Career high
*	Led the league

*	ABA record

=== Regular season ===
Year	Team	GP	GS	MPG	FG%	3P%	FT%	RPG	APG	SPG	BPG	PPG
1973–74	San Diego (ABA)	79	–	37.1	.465	.250	.743	13.9	1.8	0.8	**4.0***	15.0
1974–75	San Diego (ABA)	76	–	39.5	.489	.273	.776	**14.1**	2.1	0.8	3.2*	**19.5**
1975–76	San Diego (ABA)	10	–	**40.7**	.431	–	.636	13.6	**2.2**	**1.3**	3.7	15.9
1975–76	Kentucky (ABA)	15	–	30.5	.468	–	.703	10.5	0.9	1.1	1.1	12.4
1975–76	St. Louis (ABA)	51	–	35.5	.482	.000	.802	11.0	**2.2**	1.0	3.2	12.6
1976–77	Philadelphia (NBA)	**82**	57	24.7	**.507**	–	.552	8.1	1.1	0.5	2.4	6.0
1977–78	Philadelphia (NBA)	80	69	20.5	.471	–	.627	7.1	1.2	0.3	1.6	5.4
1978–79	Philadelphia (NBA)	78	75	27.8	.474	–	.747	9.6	1.9	0.5	2.0	9.3
1979–80	Philadelphia (NBA)	80	80	34.6	.436	.000	.697	11.9	2.1	0.5	2.0	7.4
1980–81	Philadelphia (NBA)	81	81	32.6	.449	–	.817	10.0	1.5	0.7	1.7	7.2
1981–82	Philadelphia (NBA)	81	47	30.2	.497	.000	.817	8.7	1.2	0.5	1.8	7.9
1982–83	Houston (NBA)	**82**	**82**	29.8	.453	.000	.786	8.1	1.7	0.6	1.6	9.5
1983–84	Houston (NBA)	81	73	30.9	.502	**.333**	**.837**	7.2	1.9	0.6	1.0	9.9
1984–85	Chicago (NBA)	42	32	21.1	.461	.000	.766	5.0	0.8	0.3	0.7	3.4
1985–86	Portland (NBA)	80	19	18.0	.496	.000	.827	4.4	0.9	0.5	0.8	4.7
1986–87	Portland (NBA)	78	37	20.2	.496	.000	.782	5.8	0.8	0.3	1.0	4.1
1987–88	Portland (NBA)	79	77	22.5	.487	.000	.736	5.2	1.0	0.4	1.3	4.2
1988–89	Portland (NBA)	72	40	17.8	.421	.000	.787	4.2	0.8	0.3	1.2	2.8
1989–90	San Antonio (NBA)	72	2	12.3	.465	.200	.704	3.2	0.3	0.3	0.4	2.4
Career		1299	771	27.0	.474	.192	.756	8.2	1.4	0.5	1.8	7.9
All-Star		1	−	15.0	.500	−	1.000	4.0	0.0	−	−	5.0

=== Playoffs ===
Year	Team	GP	GS	MPG	FG%	3P%	FT%	RPG	APG	SPG	BPG	PPG
1974	San Diego (ABA)	6	–	**46.2**	.409	–	.688	**15.7**	**2.5**	**1.0**	2.3	**13.8**
1977	Philadelphia (NBA)	19	–	27.0	.507	–	.600	7.9	1.1	0.5	2.1	4.8
1978	Philadelphia (NBA)	10	–	30.1	.500	–	.800	10.6	1.4	0.5	**3.0**	6.4
1979	Philadelphia (NBA)	9	–	35.6	.483	–	.778	13.4	1.9	0.4	2.4	12.7
1980	Philadelphia (NBA)	18	–	35.5	.450	.000	.808	9.7	1.9	0.7	2.1	8.8
1981	Philadelphia (NBA)	16	–	36.3	.568	–	.738	9.7	1.7	0.4	1.9	8.7
1982	Philadelphia (NBA)	**21**	–	32.3	.463	–	**.854**	9.0	0.9	0.5	1.9	8.7
1985	Chicago (NBA)	2	0	9.0	**.833**	.000	–	2.5	0.0	0.0	0.5	5.0
1986	Portland (NBA)	4	0	18.3	.353	–	.500	4.8	0.8	0.0	0.5	3.5
1987	Portland (NBA)	4	**4**	32.3	.417	–	.833	7.8	1.5	0.0	1.5	3.8
1988	Portland (NBA)	4	**4**	24.5	.375	–	.500	4.3	0.3	0.5	2.0	3.3
1989	Portland (NBA)	3	1	16.7	.667	–	–	2.7	0.0	0.0	1.0	1.3
1990	San Antonio (NBA)	9	0	7.3	.444	–	.000	1.4	0.2	0.0	0.3	0.9
Career		125	30	29.9	.475	.000	.754	8.7	1.3	0.5	1.9	7.2

== Personal life ==
Jones grew up in McGehee, Arkansas, a member of a very tall family. The 6 ft 3 in (1.91 m) Caldwell Jones Sr., and his wife, 5 ft 11 in (1.80 m) Cecelia, had eight children. Their shortest child was Clovis, the only daughter, who grew to 6 ft 3 in (1.91 m). Four of the Jones' boys played in the NBA: Wilbert (6 ft 8 in (2.03 m), one season each with the Indiana Pacers and the Buffalo Braves, plus seven seasons with three ABA teams), Caldwell (five NBA and three ABA teams), Major (6 ft 9 in (2.06 m), five seasons with the Houston Rockets, one with the Detroit Pistons), and Charles (6 ft 9 in (2.06 m), 15 seasons total with Philadelphia, the Chicago Bulls, the Washington Bullets, the Detroit Pistons and the Houston Rockets). Two other brothers played minor league basketball.

In the 37 NBA seasons accumulated by the four Jones brothers, only once did a Jones post a scoring average in double figures—Wilbert did it in the 1976–77 season with the Pacers, tallying 13.0 points per game. However, between them the brothers had several double-figure scoring seasons in the ABA.

Oliver was the first of the Jones brothers to play basketball at Georgia's Albany State university and later became head coach for 28 years at the school. Five other brothers, including Caldwell, followed. For 18 straight seasons, a Jones occupied the center position for the Albany basketball team.

Jones died of a heart attack while at a driving range near his home in Stockbridge, Georgia on September 21, 2014. He was 64 years old.

"Caldwell had never been much of a golfer", his wife Vanessa said. "He’d discovered the game late in life. But you know, he wrote that he would play golf if that’s the only thing he could do. That’s what he would do every day for the rest of his life". "Too sudden", Vanessa said, "he was fine in church and at brunch. Just a normal day. No reason to think anything was up. I miss him so much".

== See also ==
- List of NBA career blocks leaders
- List of NBA career personal fouls leaders
- List of NBA career playoff blocks leaders
