= Bo Lamar =

American basketball player (1951–2026)

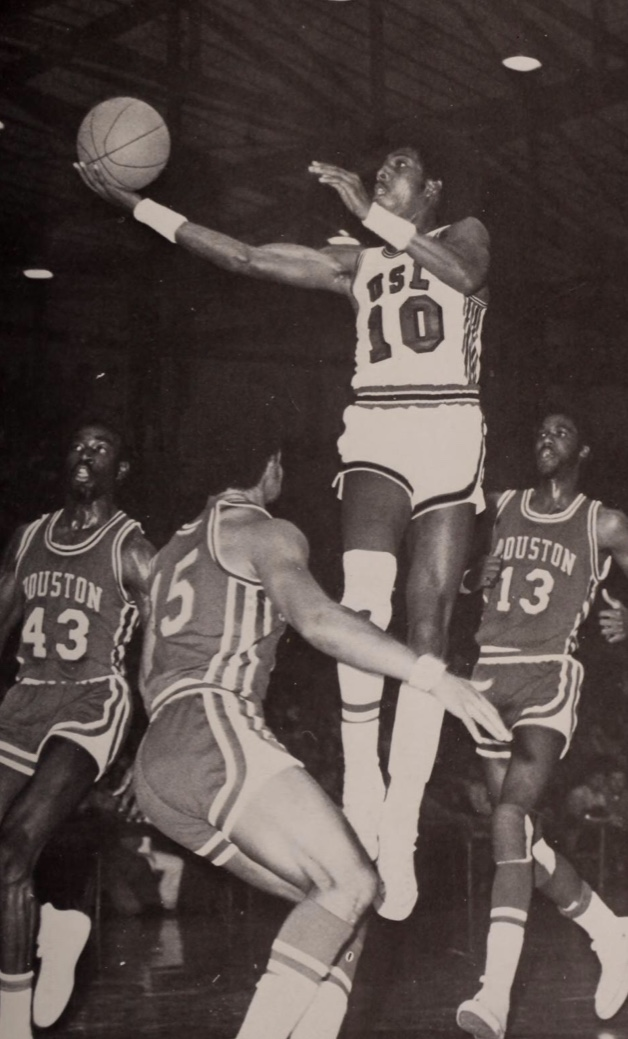
- Lamar as a junior at USL, 1972

Personal information
- Born: April 7, 1951 Columbus, Ohio, U.S.
- Died: February 16, 2026 (aged 74) Columbus, Ohio, U.S.
- Listed height: 6 ft 1 in (1.85 m)
- Listed weight: 180 lb (82 kg)

Career information
- High school: East (Columbus, Ohio)
- College: Louisiana (1969–1973)
- NBA draft: 1973: 3rd round, 44th overall pick
- Drafted by: Detroit Pistons
- Playing career: 1973–1977
- Position: Point guard
- Number: 10, 1, 11

Career history
- 1973–1975: San Diego Conquistadors / Sails
- 1975–1976: Indiana Pacers
- 1976–1977: Los Angeles Lakers

Career highlights
- ABA All-Rookie First Team (1974); 2× Consensus first-team All-American (1972, 1973); NCAA scoring champion (1972); Southland Player of the Year (1972); 2× First-team All-Southland (1972, 1973)

Career ABA and NBA statistics
- Points: 4,478 (16.4 ppg)
- Rebounds: 739 (2.7 rpg)
- Assists: 1,063 (3.9 apg)
- Stats at NBA.com
- Stats at Basketball Reference

Dwight "Bo" Lamar (April 7, 1951 – February 16, 2026) was an American professional basketball player. Born and raised in Columbus, Ohio, he was a two-time consensus All-American at University of Southwestern Louisiana (now the University of Louisiana at Lafayette), where he led the NCAA in scoring for the 1971–72 season. Lamar was the No. 1 overall pick in the 1973 American Basketball Association Draft.

== College career ==
A graduate of East High School in Columbus, Ohio, Lamar attended Southwestern Louisiana, which transitioned to Division I for the 1971–72 season. Lamar did not even average 20 points per game as a senior in high school, playing alongside friend and teammate Ed Ratleff, but Southwestern Louisiana coach Beryl Shipley made him the focus of the SLA offense, with free rein to shoot. averaging 22.8 to earn Freshman of the Year in the Gulf States Conference. Eventually, the basketball program was given a two-year death penalty by the NCAA during Lamar's senior season, and that went into effect the next season.

Lamar was a two-time college All-American in 1972 and 1973, and was named first-team All-America for the 1972–73 season along with Bill Walton, David Thompson, and Ernie DiGregorio. During his college career he averaged 31.2 points a game, for a point total of 3,493 points, which remains among the top ranks of NCAA basketball. He is known for his extremely high long-range shot that some coaches say dusted the rafters.

Hall of Fame coach Jerry Tarkanian described Bo Lamar as "one of the best shooters he had seen."

“If there had been a three-point shot in those days, he would’ve averaged 50 points a game,” Coach Beryl Shipley said.

Lamar led the Ragin’ Cajuns to a 90–23 record in his four seasons. Their record for his last three seasons was 74–13, which was bettered only by UCLA during that span.

== Professional career ==
Lamar was a third-round pick by the Detroit Pistons in the 1973 NBA draft. He was the top overall pick in the 1973 American Basketball Association Draft by the San Diego Conquistadors and signed with them.

As a rookie during the 1973–74 season, Lamar averaged 20.4 points per game for San Diego and made the ABA All-Rookie team, playing for Coach Wilt Chamberlain. He also set the franchise record, scoring 50 points in one game.

Lamar averaged 20.9 points per game in 1974–75, being reunited with his college coach Beryl Shipley, during the season. After averaging 16.0 in his third season, he ended up playing sparingly for the Lakers in 1976–77, the final year of his career. Lamar was released by the Lakers after the season.

He played for three American Basketball Association teams: the San Diego Conquistadors (1973–1975), the rebranded San Diego Sails in 1975 (who folded after 11 games) and the Indiana Pacers (1975–76) before moving to the NBA after the ABA–NBA merger. In the 1976–77 season, Lamar played 71 games for the Los Angeles Lakers. Overall, Lamar averaged 16.4 points and 3.9 assists in 273 career games. His ABA averages were 19.7 points and 4.4 assists in 202 games.

== Personal life and death ==
Lamar was the Louisiana-Lafayette basketball color analyst on radio, before retiring to his native Ohio. He died on February 16, 2026, at the age of 74.

== Honors ==
- Lamar was inducted into the UL Athletics Hall of Fame.
- One media list ranked Lamar in the Top 100 players in the history of NCAA basketball (#64).
- In 1984, Lamar was inducted into the Louisiana Sports Hall of Fame.
- In 2018, Lamar was selected for induction into the OHSAA's Circle of Champions by the Ohio State High School Athletic Association.
