= Ollie Taylor =

American basketball player (1947–2025)

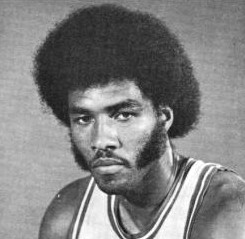
- Taylor circa 1972

Personal information
- Born: March 7, 1947 New York City, New York, U.S.
- Died: April 6, 2025 (aged 78) Pearland, Texas, U.S.
- Listed height: 6 ft 2 in (1.88 m)
- Listed weight: 194 lb (88 kg)

Career information
- High school: DeWitt Clinton (Bronx, New York)
- College: San Jacinto (1966–1968); Houston (1968–1970)
- NBA draft: 1970: 12th round, 189th overall pick
- Drafted by: Cleveland Cavaliers
- Playing career: 1970–1974
- Position: Shooting guard
- Number: 20, 22, 14

Career history
- 1970–1972: New York Nets
- 1972–1973: San Diego Conquistadors
- 1973: New York Nets
- 1973–1974: Carolina Cougars
- Stats at Basketball Reference

Oliver Harold Taylor (March 7, 1947 – April 6, 2025) was an American professional basketball player in the ABA. A 6-foot-2-inch (1.88 m) shooting guard, Taylor played college basketball for the Houston Cougars from 1968 until 1970.

== Biography ==
Taylor was selected by the Cleveland Cavaliers in the 12th round of the 1970 NBA draft. Although he did not see action in the National Basketball Association (NBA), he went on to play in four ABA seasons with the New York Nets, San Diego Conquistadors, and Carolina Cougars.

Born in New York City, Taylor rode the bench in high school before jumping vs. center against Kareem Abdul-Jabbar in college and playing against Julius Erving and Rick Barry in the ABA. Along the way, he set numerous National Junior College Athletic Association (NJCAA) records while leading San Jacinto to the 1968 national title. Taylor followed that up by lifting Houston to a Sweet 16 appearance in 1970. Taylor had a 46-inch (1.2 m) vertical leap, which he used for dunking.

Following his basketball career, Taylor worked as an aviation mechanic for United Airlines for 37 years. He died in Pearland, Texas on April 6, 2025, at the age of 78.
