= Major Jones =

American basketball player (born 1953)

Personal information
- Born: July 9, 1953 (age 73) McGehee, Arkansas, U.S.
- Listed height: 6 ft 9 in (2.06 m)
- Listed weight: 225 lb (102 kg)

Career information
- High school: Desha Central (Rohwer, Arkansas)
- College: Albany State (1972–1976)
- NBA draft: 1976: 2nd round, 20th overall pick
- Drafted by: Portland Trail Blazers
- Playing career: 1976–1985
- Position: Power forward
- Number: 11, 35

Career history
- 1976–1978: Allentown Jets
- 1978–1979: Fresno Stars
- 1979–1984: Houston Rockets
- 1984–1985: Detroit Pistons

Career highlights
- 2× All-EBA Second Team (1977, 1978); EBA Rookie of the Year (1977); First-team Parade All-American (1972)

Career NBA statistics
- Points: 1,643 (4.4 ppg)
- Rebounds: 1,323 (3.5 rpg)
- Assists: 215 (0.6 apg)
- Stats at NBA.com
- Stats at Basketball Reference

Major James Brooks Jones (born July 9, 1953) is an American retired professional basketball player who played in the NBA and other leagues. Born in McGehee, Arkansas, he played college basketball for the Albany State Golden Rams.

He was drafted by the American Basketball Association (ABA) in 1974 by the San Diego Conquistadors, and in 1976 by the National Basketball Association's Portland Trail Blazers. Jones played for the Allentown Jets of the Eastern Basketball Association from 1976 to 1978. He was selected as the EBA Rookie of the Year in 1977 and named to the All-EBA Second Team in 1977 and 1978.

Jones' brothers Wil (born 1947), Caldwell (born 1950) and Charles (born 1957) all played at Albany State and in the NBA.

== Career statistics ==
Legend
| GP | Games played | GS | Games started | MPG | Minutes per game |
| FG% | Field goal percentage | 3P% | 3-point field goal percentage | FT% | Free throw percentage |
| RPG | Rebounds per game | APG | Assists per game | SPG | Steals per game |
| BPG | Blocks per game | PPG | Points per game | **Bold** | Career high |

=== NBA ===
==== Regular season ====
| Year | Team | GP | GS | MPG | FG% | 3P% | FT% | RPG | APG | SPG | BPG | PPG |
|---|---|---|---|---|---|---|---|---|---|---|---|---|
| 1979–80 | Houston | **82** | | **18.8** | .480 | **.333** | .565 | **4.6** | **.8** | **.6** | **.8** | 5.3 |
| 1980–81 | Houston | 68 | | 14.8 | .464 | .000 | .634 | 3.4 | .6 | .3 | .3 | 4.4 |
| 1981–82 | Houston | 60 | **6** | 12.4 | .531 | .000 | .545 | 3.4 | .4 | .3 | .5 | 4.5 |
| 1982–83 | Houston | 60 | 4 | 14.6 | .457 | .000 | .549 | 4.4 | .7 | .4 | .4 | **5.7** |
| 1983–84 | Houston | 57 | 5 | 8.3 | .538 | – | .612 | 2.0 | .5 | .2 | .2 | 3.0 |
| 1984–85 | Detroit | 47 | 0 | 8.9 | **.552** | – | **.647** | 2.7 | .3 | .2 | .3 | 2.7 |
| Career | | 374 | 15 | 13.5 | .490 | .111 | .586 | 3.5 | .6 | .4 | .5 | 4.4 |

==== Playoffs ====
| Year | Team | GP | GS | MPG | FG% | 3P% | FT% | RPG | APG | SPG | BPG | PPG |
|---|---|---|---|---|---|---|---|---|---|---|---|---|
| 1980 | Houston | 6 | | **11.7** | .611 | – | **.667** | **3.7** | **.7** | .0 | **.3** | **4.7** |
| 1981 | Houston | **12** | | 7.3 | .476 | – | .400 | 1.5 | .4 | **.3** | .2 | 1.8 |
| 1985 | Detroit | 1 | 0 | 4.0 | **1.000** | – | – | .0 | .0 | .0 | .0 | 2.0 |
| Career | | 19 | 0 | 8.5 | .550 | – | .571 | 2.1 | .5 | .2 | .2 | 2.7 |
