= 1972–73 Utah Stars season =

ABA basketball team season

- Division champions
- Head coach: LaDell Andersen
- Arena: Salt Palace

Results
- Record: 55–29 (.655)
- Place: Division: 1st (ABA)
- Playoff finish: Lost in Division Finals

Local media
- Television: KUTV 2
- Radio: KALL

The 1972–73 Utah Stars season was the third season of the Stars playing in the state of Utah and sixth overall season in the American Basketball Association when including their brief stints in nearby California as the Anaheim Amigos and Los Angeles Stars. They finished the season at first place in points scored at 115.6 per game, but third in points allowed at 110.0 per game. During the first half of the regular season, they were 26–16, with them getting both ten-game winning streak in that half and a five-game losing streak, both of which were team highs for that season. In the second half of the season, they went 29–13 with a much better balance in effort in mind by comparison to the first half of the season. This would lead to the Stars once again being the best team in the Western Division, though they would be two games behind the Carolina Cougars in terms of overall records in the ABA this season. In the 1973 ABA Playoffs, the Stars swept the newly created San Diego Conquistadors expansion team in the Western Division Semifinals, but they lost to the Indiana Pacers in their rematch of the previous two Western Division Finals matches (as well as the 1970 ABA Finals back when the Utah Stars were known as the Los Angeles Stars) in six games instead of in seven games like they had done last season. After the season ended, LaDell Andersen resigned from his duties as the team's head coach, being replaced by Joe Mullaney for the upcoming season.

== ABA Draft ==
Weirdly enough, as of 2025, there has been no official draft records for the first five rounds of the 1972 ABA draft specifically, while every other round after that point has been properly recorded by basketball historians otherwise. Because of the strange dispersity of draft picks not being properly recorded this year after previously being fully recorded in the previous year's draft and the number of rounds potentially being off for even the players being selected this year, the recorded players selected in this year's draft will be marked with a ? for the pick number in particular (as well as certain round numbers, if necessary) in order to showcase the awkward display currently going on with the 1972 ABA draft year in particular (though what is known is that the Stars were likely the last team to draft someone in this draft in the 20th round, as well as the fourth and final ABA team to forfeit their first round draft pick choice after the Memphis Pros, New York Nets, and Virginia Squires all forfeited what would have been their respective #2, #6, and #9 picks (with Utah forfeiting what would have been considered the #10 pick had none of the other teams forfeited their choices also) due to the Pros acquiring Larry Cannon from the Denver Rockets sometime after the 1971 ABA draft ended, the Nets acquiring Jim Chones (a junior college player previously drafted by the Squires in the 1971 ABA draft that got rescinded by the ABA not long afterward due to a perceived ABA-NBA merger occurring that year instead of by 1976) sometime after the 1971 ABA draft, the Squires acquiring superstar small forward Julius Erving sometime after the 1971 ABA draft, and the Stars acquiring star forward Jimmy Jones from the Pros sometime after the 1971 ABA draft ended). However, if any changes come up to where a proper, official recording of the 1972 ABA draft gets released displaying both pick numbers and round numbers for where certain players got selected, please provide the updated (potential) draft ordering with a source confirming the round and pick numbers included here.

Round	Pick	Player	Position(s)	Nationality	College
2(?)	15(?)	Chris Ford	SG	United States	Villanova
3(?)	26(?)	Travis Grant	SF	United States	Kentucky State College
4(?)	35(?)	Chuck Jura	C	United States	Nebraska
5(?)	41(?)	Bob Nash	SF	United States	Hawaii
6	52(?)	Tom Patterson	SF/PF	United States	Ouachita Baptist
7	63(?)	Eric McWilliams	SF	United States	Long Beach State
8	74(?)	Frank Russell	SG	United States	Detroit
9	85(?)	Mike Jackson	PF	United States	Cal State Los Angeles
10	96(?)	Kevin Porter	PG	United States	Saint Francis College (Pennsylvania)
11	107(?)	Willie Hart	C	United States	Grambling College
12	118(?)	Lloyd Neal	PF/C	United States	Tennessee State
13	129(?)	Simpson Degrate	SG/SF	United States	Texas Christian
14	140(?)	Mose Adolph	G	United States	Cal State Los Angeles
15	149(?)	Harvey Catchings	PF/C	United States	Hardin–Simmons University
16	158(?)	Richard Dixon	G	United States	Loyola University of Los Angeles
17	167(?)	Henry Steele	C	United States	Northeast Louisiana University
18	173(?)	Dwight Holiday	SG	United States	Hawaii
19	177(?)	George Price	G	United States	Colorado State
20	179(?)	George Bryant	PG	United States	Eastern Kentucky

Had the Utah Stars not forfeited their first round pick in this year's draft, they would have joined the Denver Rockets as the only other team to have used up all 20 rounds of their ABA draft picks this year, though they wouldn't still have had the most draft picks at hand this time around due to the Rockets previously trading with the Indiana Pacers some time before the 1972 ABA draft began.

=== ABA Dispersal Draft ===
Months after the original ABA draft for this year concluded, the ABA held their first ever dispersal draft on July 13, 1972 after it was found out by the ABA itself that neither "The Floridians" nor the Pittsburgh Condors would be able to continue operations either in their original locations or elsewhere in the U.S.A. (or even Canada in the case of "The Floridians"). Unlike the main draft they did during the months of March and April, this draft would last for only six rounds as a one day deal and would have the nine remaining inaugural ABA teams selecting players that were left over at the time from both "The Floridians" and Pittsburgh Condors franchises (including draft picks from both teams there) and obtain their player rights from there. Any players from either franchise that wouldn't be selected during this draft would be placed on waivers and enter free agency afterward. Interestingly, only 42 total players were selected by the nine remaining ABA teams at the time of the dispersal draft, meaning everyone else that was available from both teams was considered a free agent to the ABA not long afterward. The Stars would also be the only team to draft players in five out of six rounds instead of either all six rounds or in a lesser amount of rounds like most other ABA teams did. In any case, the following players were either Floridians or Condors players that the Stars acquired during this dispersal draft.

Round	Pick	Player	Position(s)	Nationality	College	ABA Team
1	10	Larry Jones	PG/SG	United States	Toledo	The Floridians
2	19	Chic Downing	F	United States	Benedictine College	Pittsburgh Condors
3	27	Wil Robinson	SG	United States	West Virginia	Pittsburgh Condors
4	35	Henry Seawright	G	United States	Manhattan College	Pittsburgh Condors
5	40	Billy Pleas	SF	United States	Detroit	Pittsburgh Condors

Interestingly, the Stars would join the Dallas Chaparrals as the only other team to have the majority of their selections in the dispersal draft come from the Pittsburgh Condors franchise instead of "The Floridians" franchise like most other ABA teams in this draft did. Despite that notion, Utah would still decide to use their first round pick of that draft on a player from "The Floridians" franchise with the selection of Larry Jones, who would briefly play for Utah before being traded to Dallas later in the season (albeit in 1972 still). As for the Condors players the Stars decided to select in this draft, all of these players would actually be recent draft picks that the Condors franchise made at the time before later folding operations entirely, including Wil Robinson, who would not play for the Stars this season, but later played in the ABA for the Memphis Tams the following season after this one instead.

== Roster ==
1972–73 Utah Stars roster
Players

Pos.	No.	Player	Height	Weight	DOB	From
PF	44	John Beasley	6 ft 9 in (2.06 m)	225 lb (102 kg)	February 5, 1944	Texas A&M
C	31	Zelmo Beaty	6 ft 9 in (2.06 m)	225 lb (102 kg)	October 25, 1939	Prairie View A&M
SG	24	Ron Boone	6 ft 2 in (1.88 m)	200 lb (91 kg)	September 6, 1946	Idaho State
SG	40	Glen Combs	6 ft 2 in (1.88 m)	185 lb (84 kg)	October 30, 1946	Virginia Tech
C	25	Gerald Govan	6 ft 10 in (2.08 m)	220 lb (100 kg)	January 2, 1942	Saint Mary of the Plains College
C	33	Ira Harge	6 ft 9 in (2.06 m)	225 lb (102 kg)	March 14, 1941	New Mexico
PF	21	Mike Jackson	6 ft 7 in (2.01 m)	215 lb (98 kg)	July 31, 1949	Cal State LA
PG	15	Jimmy Jones	6 ft 4 in (1.93 m)	188 lb (85 kg)	January 1, 1945	Grambling State
PG	32	Larry Jones	6 ft 2 in (1.88 m)	180 lb (82 kg)	September 22, 1942	Toledo
SF	14	Roderick McDonald	6 ft 6 in (1.98 m)	205 lb (93 kg)	April 9, 1945	Whitworth
SF	35	Cincy Powell	6 ft 7 in (2.01 m)	220 lb (100 kg)	February 25, 1942	Portland
SG	12	Bob Warren	6 ft 5 in (1.96 m)	190 lb (86 kg)	July 17, 1946	Vanderbilt
PG	32	Charlie Williams	6 ft 0 in (1.83 m)	165 lb (75 kg)	September 5, 1943	Seattle
SF	42	Willie Wise	6 ft 5 in (1.96 m)	210 lb (95 kg)	March 3, 1947	Drake

Coaches
Head coach
- LaDell Andersen
Assistant(s)
- Larry Creger

Legend
- (DP) Unsigned draft pick
- (FA) Free agent
- (S) Suspended
- Injured

Roster

== Final standings ==
=== Western Division ===
Team	W	L	%	GB
Utah Stars	55	29	.655	-
Indiana Pacers	51	33	.607	4
Denver Rockets	47	37	.560	8
San Diego Conquistadors	30	54	.357	25
Dallas Chaparrals	28	56	.333	27

== ABA Playoffs ==
ABA Western Division Semifinals vs. San Diego Conquistadors

Game	Date	Location	Score	Record	Attendance
1	April 2	Utah	114–99	1–0	7,268
2	April 4	Utah	119–105	2–0	7,271
3	April 7	San Diego	97–96	3–0	1,729
4	April 8	San Diego	120–98	4–0	1,394

Stars win series, 4–0

ABA Western Division Finals vs. Indiana Pacers

Game	Date	Location	Score	Record	Attendance
1	April 12	Utah	124–107	1–0	7,712
2	April 14	Utah	110–116	1–1	12,233
3	April 16	Indiana	108–118	1–2	9,353
4	April 18	Indiana	104–103	2–2	10,079
5	April 19	Utah	102–104	2–3	12,453
6	April 21	Indiana	98–107	2–4	9,529

Stars lose series, 4–2

== Awards and honors ==
1973 ABA All-Star Game selections (game played on February 6, 1973)

- Willie Wise
- Zelmo Beaty
- Jimmy Jones
- All-ABA Second Team selection: Jimmy Jones
