= Beryl Shipley =

American basketball player-coach

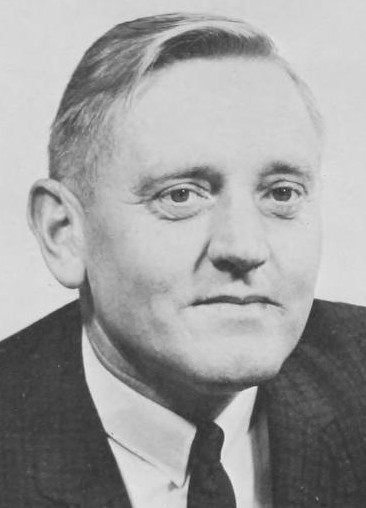
- Shipley, circa 1968

Biographical details
- Born: August 10, 1926; Kingsport, Tennessee, U.S.
- Died: April 15, 2011 (aged 84); Lafayette, Louisiana, U.S.

Playing career
- 1947–1949: Hinds JC
- 1949–1951: Delta State

Coaching career (HC unless noted)
- 1951–1952: Morgan City HS (LA)
- 1952–1957: Starkville HS (MS)
- 1957–1973: Southwestern Louisiana
- 1974–1975: San Diego Conquistadors

Administrative career (AD unless noted)
- 1958–1960: Southwestern Louisiana

Head coaching record
- Overall: 293–126 (.699)

Accomplishments and honors

Championships
- 5× GSC regular season (1964, 1966–69); 2× Southland regular season (1972–73)*

Awards
- 4× GSC Coach of the Year; Southland Coach of the Year (1973)

Beryl Clyde Shipley (August 10, 1926 – April 15, 2011) was an American basketball coach. A native of Kingsport, Tennessee, he is best known for his tenure as head coach of the University of Southwestern Louisiana—now as the University of Louisiana at Lafayette—from 1957 to 1973.

== Career ==
Shipley was hired at what was then Southwestern Louisiana Institute in 1958. In 1966, Shipley recruited three black players, thus becoming the first collegiate coach in the Deep South to have black players on his team. In a region where Jim Crow was a way of life well into the 1960s—long after most Jim Crow laws were formally repealed—Shipley faced intense criticism and opposition for trying to integrate his teams. However, he said years later that he was tired of telling good players that he couldn't sign them because of an unwritten Gulf States Conference rule forbidding black players on conference teams. When state officials barred state money from being used to fund the scholarships for the players, Shipley had area black leaders chip in enough money to pay the players' way. However, this violated an NCAA rule against players receiving financial assistance from outside their family. In 1968, partly due to this, the Ragin' Cajuns were slapped with two years' probation and barred from postseason play during that time.

Shipley did not take long to recover from the probation, however. In 1972, the Ragin' Cajuns jumped to Division I, finished in the top 10 of most major polls and advanced all the way to the Sweet 16 of the NCAA Tournament, becoming the first school to make the tournament in its first year of eligibility. They repeated this feat in 1973. However, a month after the tournament, Shipley abruptly resigned. That August, the NCAA found Southwestern Louisiana guilty of more than 125 violations. Most of them involved small cash payments to players, letting players borrow coaches' and boosters' cars, letting players use university credit cards to buy gas and buying clothes and other objects for players. However, the most severe violations involved massive academic fraud. The NCAA found that one of Shipley's assistants had altered a recruit's high school transcript and forged the principal's signature, and others close to the program had arranged for surrogates to take college entrance exams for prospective recruits. The NCAA responded by scrubbing the Ragin' Cajuns' 1972 and 1973 appearances from the books and shutting the program down for two years—the first time that the NCAA had ever punished a school with the so-called "death penalty," and to date the only multi-season cancellation ever handed down to a Division I member in any sport.

Midway through the 1974–75 season, he became coach of the ABA's San Diego Conquistadors.

== Retirement and death ==
After this, he retired from coaching (with Bill Musselman taking on the vacant head coaching role for the later rebranded San Diego Sails) and became involved in the oil distribution business. In his later years, Shipley admitted to violating NCAA rules, but claimed he did so for "humanitarian reasons." In an interview with Sports Illustrated in 2011, he mentioned that one of his players came to school with only one set of clothes and no sheets for his bed. The player was too poor to buy them, so Shipley felt compelled to buy some for him out of his own pocket. However, he denied knowing about the academic fraud, and fought for years to clear his name to no avail. He was largely ostracized by Southwestern Louisiana/Louisiana-Lafayette for many years; school officials took the line that as the head coach, he should have had more control over the program.

Shipley suffered two heart attacks in the 1980s and later had surgery to repair an aortic aneurysm. He was diagnosed with lung cancer in 2010 which eventually spread into his brain. Louisiana-Lafayette held a reunion of the 1972 and 1973 teams in January 2011, but by then Shipley was too sick to attend. Shipley died on April 15, 2011, at the age of 84.

== Head coaching record ==
=== College ===
Record table
Season	Team	Overall	Conference	Standing	Postseason
Southwestern Louisiana Ragin' Cajuns (Gulf States Conference) (1957–1971)
1957–58	Southwestern Louisiana	16–11	5–5		
1958–59	Southwestern Louisiana	14–10	5–5		
1959–60	Southwestern Louisiana	20–8	7–3		
1960–61	Southwestern Louisiana	18–5	7–3		
1961–62	Southwestern Louisiana	17–8	7–3		
1962–63	Southwestern Louisiana	12–13	6–4		
1963–64	Southwestern Louisiana	13–10	7–3	1st	
1964–65	Southwestern Louisiana	20–10	5–5		NAIA Second Round
1965–66	Southwestern Louisiana	17–8	10–2	1st	
1966–67	Southwestern Louisiana	20–11	10–2	1st	NAIA Elite Eight
1967–68	Southwestern Louisiana	19–5	11–1	1st	
1968–69	Southwestern Louisiana	20–7	11–1	1st	
1969–70	Southwestern Louisiana	16–10	9–3		
1970–71	Southwestern Louisiana	25–4			NCAA College Division Final Four *
Southwestern Louisiana Ragin' Cajuns (Southland Conference) (1971–1973)
1971–72	Southwestern Louisiana	25–4 *	8–0 *	1st	NCAA University Division Sweet Sixteen *
1972–73	Southwestern Louisiana	24–5 *	12–0 *	1st	NCAA University Division Sweet Sixteen *
Southwestern Louisiana:		293–126 (.699)	19–11 (.633)		
Total:		293–126 (.699)			

* ^^{a} ^{b} ^{c} ^{d} ^{e} ^{f} ^{g} Southwestern Louisiana vacated all tournament appearances and some victories due to the illegal recruiting scandal. In addition, they vacated 6 games from the 1971–72 & 1972–73 seasons, making their record officially 23–3 in both seasons.

=== ABA ===
Team	Year	G	W	L	W–L%	Finish	PG	PW	PL	PW–L%	Result
San Diego	1974–75	46	16	30	.348	5th in ABA Western	–	–	–	–	Missed playoffs
Career		46	16	30	.348		0	0	0	–	
