= Kevin Joyce (basketball) =

American basketball player

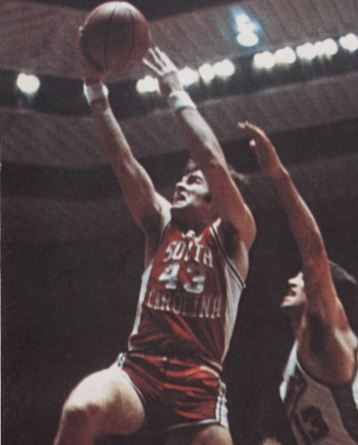
- Joyce as a junior at South Carolina

Personal information
- Born: June 27, 1951 (age 75) Bayside, New York, U.S.
- Listed height: 6 ft 3 in (1.91 m)
- Listed weight: 190 lb (86 kg)

Career information
- High school: Archbishop Molloy (Jamaica, New York)
- College: South Carolina (1970–1973)
- NBA draft: 1973: 1st round, 11th overall pick
- Drafted by: Golden State Warriors
- Position: Point guard / shooting guard
- Number: 43

Career history
- 1973–1975: Indiana Pacers
- 1975: San Diego Sails
- 1975–1976: Kentucky Colonels

Career highlights
- Consensus second-team All-American (1973); No. 43 retired by South Carolina Gamecocks; First-team Parade All-American (1969)
- Stats at Basketball Reference
Medals
Men's basketball
Representing United States
Olympic Games
Silver medal – second place	1972 Munich	Team

Kevin Francis Joyce (born June 27, 1951) is an American former professional basketball player.

A 6'3" guard born in Bayside, New York, Joyce played at the University of South Carolina. During the 1971 ACC Tournament championship game, he out-jumped North Carolina's 6'10" Lee Dedmon with seconds left to tap the ball to Tom Owens. who made a lay-up to complete a dramatic come-from-behind victory.

Joyce played at the 1972 Summer Olympics as a member of the United States national basketball team, who lost a highly controversial final game to the Soviet Union. The American team did not accept the silver medals. He later played professionally in the American Basketball Association as a member of the Indiana Pacers, San Diego Sails and Kentucky Colonels.
