= K.C. Jones =

American basketball player and coach (1932–2020)

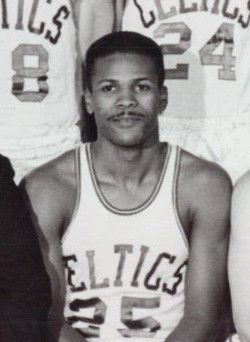
- Jones with the Boston Celtics in 1960

Personal information
- Born: May 25, 1932 Taylor, Texas, U.S.
- Died: December 25, 2020 (aged 88) Connecticut, U.S.
- Listed height: 6 ft 1 in (1.85 m)
- Listed weight: 200 lb (91 kg)

Career information
- High school: Commerce (San Francisco, California)
- College: San Francisco (1952–1956)
- NBA draft: 1956: 2nd round, 13th overall pick
- Drafted by: Boston Celtics
- Playing career: 1958–1968
- Position: Point guard
- Number: 27, 25
- Coaching career: 1967–1998

Career history

Playing
- 1958–1967: Boston Celtics
- 1967–1968: Hartford Capitols

Coaching
- 1967–1970: Brandeis
- 1970–1971: Harvard (assistant)
- 1971–1972: Los Angeles Lakers (assistant)
- 1972–1973: San Diego Conquistadors
- 1973–1976: Capital / Washington Bullets
- 1976–1977: Milwaukee Bucks (assistant)
- 1978–1983: Boston Celtics (assistant)
- 1983–1988: Boston Celtics
- 1989–1990: Seattle SuperSonics (assistant)
- 1990–1992: Seattle SuperSonics
- 1994–1995: Detroit Pistons (assistant)
- 1996–1997: Boston Celtics (assistant)
- 1997–1998: New England Blizzard

Career highlights
- As player: 8× NBA champion (1959–1966); No. 25 retired by Boston Celtics; 2× NCAA champion (1955, 1956); Consensus second-team All-American (1956); No. 4 retired by San Francisco Dons; As head coach: 2× NBA champion (1984, 1986); 5× NBA All-Star Game head coach (1975, 1984–1987); Top 15 Coaches in NBA History; Chuck Daly Lifetime Achievement Award (2016); As assistant coach: 2× NBA champion (1972, 1981)

Career playing statistics
- Points: 5,011 (7.4 ppg)
- Rebounds: 2,399 (3.5 rpg)
- Assists: 2,908 (4.3 apg)
- Stats at NBA.com
- Stats at Basketball Reference

Career coaching record
- ABA & NBA: 552–306 (.643)
- Record at Basketball Reference
- Basketball Hall of Fame
- Collegiate Basketball Hall of Fame
Medals
Men's basketball
Representing the United States
Olympic Games
Gold medal – first place	1956 Melbourne	Team competition

K.C. Jones Jr. (May 25, 1932 – December 25, 2020) was an American professional basketball player and coach. He is best known for his association with the Boston Celtics of the National Basketball Association (NBA), with whom he won 11 of his 12 NBA championships (eight as a player, two as an assistant coach, and two as a head coach). As a player, he is tied for third for most NBA championships in a career, and is one of three NBA players with an unsurpassed 8–0 record in NBA Finals series. He is the only African-American coach other than Bill Russell to have won multiple NBA championships, and one of eight players to ever achieve the basketball Triple Crown. Jones was inducted into the Naismith Memorial Basketball Hall of Fame in 1989.

== Early life ==
Jones was born in Taylor, Texas, as the oldest of six children. The initials "K.C." were his given name; he inherited the same name as his father, a factory worker and cook, who himself was named after the fabled railroad engineer Casey Jones. When Jones was aged nine, his parents divorced and he moved to San Francisco, California, with his mother and two siblings. He learned to play basketball on a patch of gravel.

Jones attended Commerce High School in San Francisco where he played basketball and football. He considered himself to be a better football player than a basketball player in high school.

== College career ==
Jones played college basketball at the University of San Francisco and, along with Bill Russell, guided the Dons to NCAA championships in 1955 and 1956. During their time with the Dons, Russell and Jones led the team to a then-record 55-game win streak (including an undefeated 29–0 record during the 1955–56 season) and helped pioneer a play that later became known as the alley-oop.

Jones also played with Russell on the United States national team which won the gold medal at the 1956 Olympic Games in Melbourne, Australia, while defeating their opponents by an unsurpassed average margin of 53.5 points per game.

Jones served two years in the United States Army from 1956 to 1958.

In July 1958, Jones tried out for the Los Angeles Rams of the National Football League (NFL); the Rams had drafted him in the 30th round of the 1955 NFL draft. He decided to try for a football career because he did not know if he had the ability to make it as a professional basketball player. Jones had not played a full season of football since his senior year at Commerce High School and only played in one regulation game afterwards during his stint in the army. Jones planned to report to the Boston Celtics in September if he failed to make the Rams. Playing as a defensive halfback, he was considered a likely candidate to make the team after preseason performances against the Washington Redskins and New York Giants. On September 2, 1958, Jones decided that he wanted to play for the Celtics and left the Rams.

== Professional career ==
=== Boston Celtics (1958–1967) ===
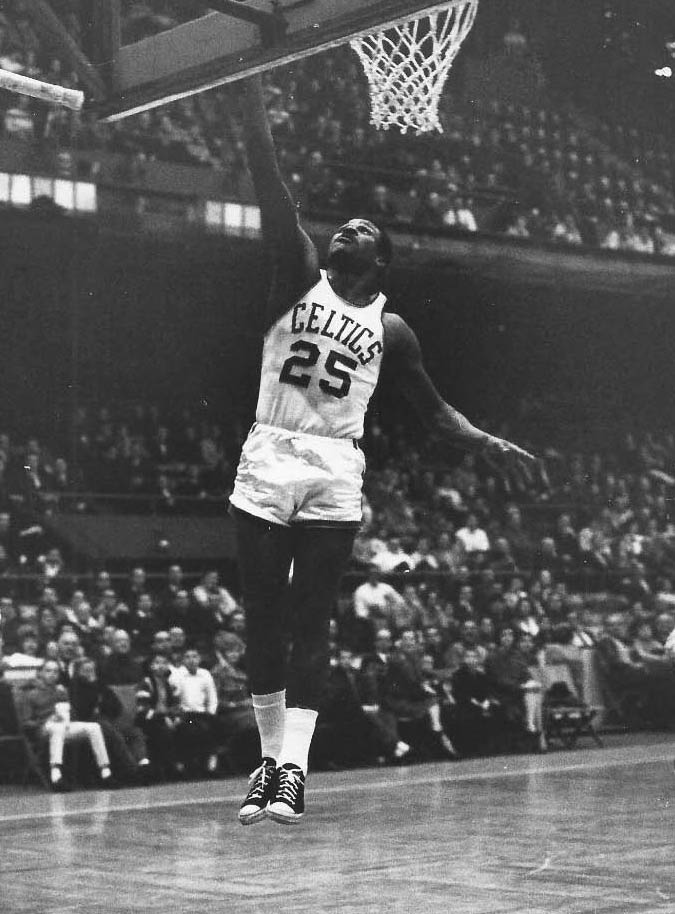
Jones with the Boston Celtics in 1964

During his playing days, he was known as a tenacious defender. Jones spent all of his nine seasons in the NBA with the Boston Celtics, being part of eight championship teams from 1959 to 1966, retiring after the Celtics' loss to the Philadelphia 76ers in the 1967 Eastern Division finals. He was inducted into the Naismith Memorial Basketball Hall of Fame in 1989.

Jones is one of only eight players in basketball history to achieve the basketball Triple Crown — winning an NCAA championship, an NBA championship, and an Olympic gold medal, joining Bill Russell, Magic Johnson, Michael Jordan, Jerry Lucas, Clyde Lovellette, Quinn Buckner, and Anthony Davis. In NBA history, only his former teammates Russell (11 championships) and Sam Jones (10) have won more championships during their playing careers.

=== Hartford Capitols (1967–1968) ===
On September 11, 1967, Jones announced that he would play for the Hartford Capitols of the Eastern Professional Basketball League (EPBL). He joined the Capitols because his coaching job at Brandeis University meant he was based nearby and he would be able to play on weekends. On November 12, Jones scored 5 points in his debut against the Wilmington Blue Bombers. He appeared in a total of 6 games with an average of 6.5 points, 4.0 rebounds and 6.8 assists per game. On January 5, 1968, Jones was placed on the Capitols' taxi squad at his own request and was not expected to play again. He reflected on his Capitols tenure: "I can't shoot, and I didn't feel like I was helping them enough. Nine years a pro and I still can't shoot. It's frustrating. I never was a complete player."

== Coaching career ==
Jones began his coaching career at Brandeis University, serving as its head coach from 1967 to 1970. He served as an assistant coach at Harvard University from 1970 to 1971. Jones then reunited with former teammate Bill Sharman as the assistant coach for the 1971–72 NBA champion Los Angeles Lakers. During that season, the team won a record 33 straight games. He became the first-ever head coach of the ABA's San Diego Conquistadors on August 8, 1972.

One week after Jones' only season with the Conquistadors ended with his resignation, he returned to the NBA and agreed with the Baltimore Bullets, who were in the process of relocating to Washington, D.C., to take over for Gene Shue as head coach for the soon-to-be-renamed Capital Bullets on June 18, 1973; the team would add Washington to its name beginning in 1974. During his three years in Washington, the Bullets had a 155–91 win‐loss record and arguably the most talented team in the league. Being swept by the Golden State Warriors in the 1975 NBA Finals and a seven-game loss to the Cleveland Cavaliers in the Eastern Conference semifinals the following year resulted in Jones' contract not being renewed on May 7, 1976. He was replaced by Dick Motta three weeks later on May 28, 1976.

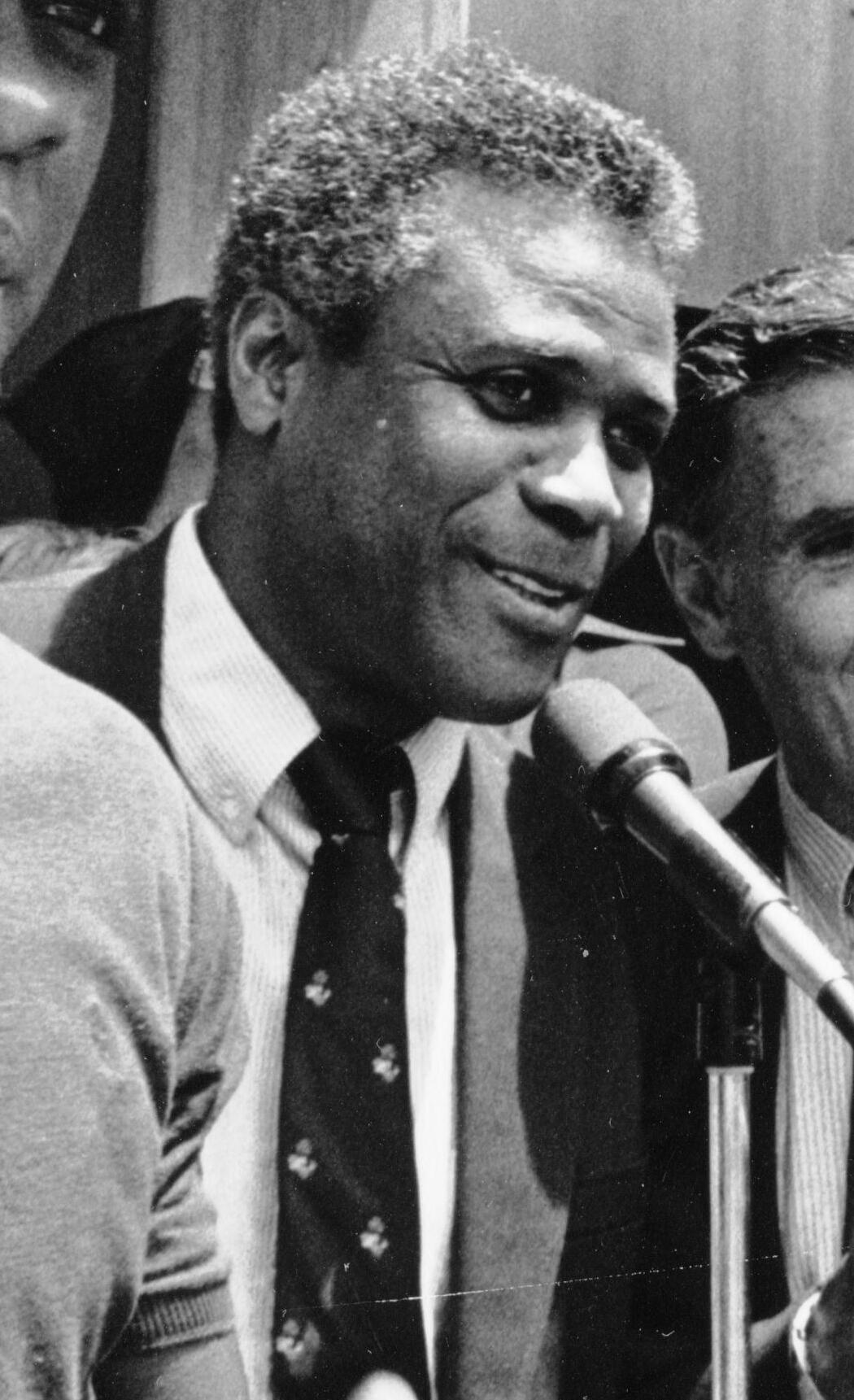
Jones as head coach of the Boston Celtics, c. 1984

In 1983, Jones took over as head coach of the Boston Celtics, replacing Bill Fitch. Jones guided the Larry Bird-led Celtics to championships in 1984 and 1986. Also in 1986, Jones led the Eastern squad in the 1986 NBA All-Star Game in Dallas at the Reunion Arena, beating the Western squad 139–132. The Celtics won the Atlantic Division in all five of Jones's seasons as head coach and reached the NBA Finals in four of his five years as coach. In a surprise announcement, he retired after the 1987–88 season and was succeeded by assistant coach Jimmy Rodgers. Jones spent one season in the Celtics' front office in 1988–89, then resigned to join the Seattle SuperSonics as an assistant coach and basketball consultant for the 1989–90 season. He served as head coach of the Sonics in 1990–91 and 1991–92.

In 1994, Jones joined the Detroit Pistons as an assistant coach for one season. The Pistons' head coach at that time, Don Chaney, had previously played for Jones with the Celtics. Jones was also considered to once again coach the Celtics during the off-season in 1995. In 1996, Jones returned to the Boston Celtics, this time as an assistant coach for one season.

Jones returned to the professional coaching ranks in 1997, guiding the New England Blizzard of the fledgling women's American Basketball League (1996–1998) through its last 1 1/2 seasons of existence. The Blizzard made the playoffs in his second year as head coach, but they were summarily dispatched by the San Jose Lasers.

== Personal life ==
Jones married Beverly Cain – the sister of his Olympic teammate Carl Cain – in 1959; they had five children together before they divorced. He had a sixth child with his second wife, Ellen. His son, Kipper, played as a guard at Bentley College. His daughter, Bryna, received a basketball and volleyball scholarship to attend the University of Hawaiʻi.

=== Death ===
Jones died on December 25, 2020, at an assisted living center in Connecticut, aged 88. He had Alzheimer's disease.

== NBA career statistics ==
Legend
GP	Games played	GS	Games started	MPG	Minutes per game
FG%	Field goal percentage	3P%	3-point field goal percentage	FT%	Free throw percentage
RPG	Rebounds per game	APG	Assists per game	SPG	Steals per game
BPG	Blocks per game	PPG	Points per game	**Bold**	Career high
†	Won an NBA championship

=== Regular season ===
Year	Team	GP	MPG	FG%	FT%	RPG	APG	PPG
1958–59†	Boston	49	12.4	.339	.603	2.6	1.4	3.5
1959–60†	Boston	74	17.2	**.408**	**.753**	2.7	2.6	6.3
1960–61†	Boston	78	20.6	.338	.664	3.6	3.2	7.6
1961–62†	Boston	**80**	25.7	.406	.634	3.7	4.3	**9.2**
1962–63†	Boston	79	24.6	.389	.633	3.3	4.0	7.2
1963–64†	Boston	80	30.3	.392	.524	**4.7**	5.1	8.2
1964–65†	Boston	78	31.2	.396	.630	4.1	5.6	8.3
1965–66†	Boston	**80**	**33.9**	.388	.690	3.8	**6.3**	8.6
1966–67	Boston	78	31.4	.397	.630	3.1	5.0	6.2
Career		676	25.9	.387	.647	3.5	4.3	7.4

=== Playoffs ===
Year	Team	GP	MPG	FG%	FT%	RPG	APG	PPG
1959†	Boston	8	9.4	.250	**1.000**	1.5	1.3	1.9
1960†	Boston	13	17.8	.338	.773	3.5	1.1	5.5
1961†	Boston	9	11.4	.300	.500	2.1	1.7	2.8
1962†	Boston	14	23.5	**.431**	.717	**4.0**	3.9	9.0
1963†	Boston	13	19.6	.297	.700	2.8	2.8	4.5
1964†	Boston	10	31.2	.347	.520	3.7	**6.8**	6.3
1965†	Boston	12	**33.0**	.413	.778	3.3	6.2	**10.1**
1966†	Boston	**17**	31.9	.413	.684	3.1	4.4	7.6
1967	Boston	9	28.2	.320	.611	2.7	5.3	6.6
Career		105	23.8	.367	.691	3.0	3.8	6.4

== Head coaching record ==
Legend
Regular season	G	Games coached	W	Games won	L	Games lost	W–L %	Win–loss %
Playoffs	PG	Playoff games	PW	Playoff wins	PL	Playoff losses	PW–L %	Playoff win–loss %

Team	Year	G	W	L	W–L%	Finish	PG	PW	PL	PW–L%	Result
San Diego (ABA)	1972–73	84	30	54	.357	4th in Western	4	0	4	.000	Lost in Division semifinals
Capital	1973–74	82	47	35	.573	1st in Central	7	3	4	.429	Lost in Conference semifinals
Washington	1974–75	82	60	22	.732	1st in Central	17	8	9	.471	Lost in NBA Finals
Washington	1975–76	82	48	34	.585	2nd in Central	7	3	4	.429	Lost in Conference semifinals
Boston	1983–84	82	62	20	.756	1st in Atlantic	23	15	8	.652	Won NBA Championship
Boston	1984–85	82	63	19	.768	1st in Atlantic	21	13	8	.619	Lost in NBA Finals
Boston	1985–86	82	67	15	.817	1st in Atlantic	18	15	3	.833	Won NBA Championship
Boston	1986–87	82	59	23	.720	1st in Atlantic	23	13	10	.565	Lost in NBA Finals
Boston	1987–88	82	57	25	.695	1st in Atlantic	17	9	8	.529	Lost in Conference finals
Seattle	1990–91	82	41	41	.500	5th in Pacific	5	2	3	.400	Lost in First round
Seattle	1991–92	36	18	18	.500	(fired)	—	—	—	—	—
NBA career		774	522	252	.674		138	81	57	.587	—
ABA career		80	30	54	.357		4	0	4	.000	
Total career		858	552	306	.643		142	81	61	.570	

== Awards and honors ==
- Two-time NCAA Champion
- 1956 Olympic Gold Medal winner
- 12-time NBA Champion (eight as a player, two as a head coach, two as an assistant coach)
- "Triple Crown" (NCAA, NBA, Olympic champion) winner
- Five-time NBA All-Star Game head coach
- Naismith Memorial Basketball Hall of Fame (class of 1989)
- College Basketball Hall of Fame (class of 2006)
- U.S. Olympic Hall of Fame (class of 1986 – as a member of the 1956 U.S. men's basketball team)
- 2016 Chuck Daly Lifetime Achievement Award

Preceded by Initial coach	San Diego Conquistadors head coach 1972–1973	Succeeded by Wilt Chamberlain
