= 1972–73 ABA season =

- League: American Basketball Association
- Sport: Basketball
- Duration: October 12, 1972 – May 12, 1973
- Games: 84
- Teams: 10

Regular season
- Top seed: Carolina Cougars
- Season MVP: Billy Cunningham (Carolina)
- Top scorer: Dan Issel (Kentucky)

Playoffs
- Eastern champions: Kentucky Colonels
- Eastern runners-up: Carolina Cougars
- Western champions: Indiana Pacers
- Western runners-up: Utah Stars

Finals
- Champions: Indiana Pacers
- Runners-up: Kentucky Colonels

ABA seasons
- ← 1971–72 1973–74 →

The 1972–73 ABA season was the sixth season of the American Basketball Association. Following the conclusion of the 1972 ABA draft (which weirdly has the first five rounds not properly recorded when the rest of the draft rounds have been properly recorded as of 2026), both The Floridians and the Pittsburgh Condors franchises had folded operations after failing to find viable places to relocate their operations going forward, which briefly left the ABA with only nine competing teams in the offseason. However, the ABA decided to (for the first and only time in league history) award an expansion franchise to Dr. Leonard Bloom (President and CEO of the United States Capital Corporation) for $1 million to play in San Diego, California, with him naming the team the San Diego Conquistadors (though due to a feud with the original tenants of the San Diego Sports Arena (who wanted to own their own professional basketball team in the ABA themselves), they did not play in San Diego Sports Arena, but instead played their games at the Peterson Gymnasium this season). Subsequently, this meant that the Memphis Tams (formerly the Memphis Pros) would move to the Eastern Division. Once again, the best regular season team did not win the ABA Finals, with the Indiana Pacers (who had the 4th best record), led by playoff MVP George McGinnis, winning the ABA championship, 4 games to 3 over the Kentucky Colonels.

Coaching changes
Offseason
Team	1971–72 coach	1972–73 coach
Carolina Cougars	Tom Meschery	Larry Brown
Dallas Chaparrals	Tom Nissalke	Babe McCarthy
Memphis Tams	Babe McCarthy	Bob Bass
In-season
Team	Outgoing coach	Incoming coach
Dallas Chaparrals	Babe McCarthy	Dave Brown

== Teams ==
1972–73 American Basketball Association
Division	Team	City	Arena	Capacity
Eastern	Carolina Cougars	Greensboro, North Carolina; Charlotte, North Carolina; Raleigh, North Carolina	Greensboro Coliseum; Charlotte Coliseum; Dorton Arena	15,000; 9,605; 7,610
Eastern	Kentucky Colonels	Louisville, Kentucky	Freedom Hall	16,664
Eastern	Memphis Tams	Memphis, Tennessee	Mid-South Coliseum	10,085
Eastern	New York Nets	Uniondale, New York	Nassau Veterans Memorial Coliseum	13,571
Eastern	Virginia Squires	Old Dominion University Fieldhouse; Hampton Coliseum; Richmond Arena; Salem Civic Center; Roanoke Civic Center	Norfolk, Virginia; Hampton, Virginia; Richmond, Virginia; Salem, Virginia; Roanoke, Virginia	5,200; 9,777; 6,000; 6,820; 9,828
Western	Dallas Chaparrals	University Park, Texas; Dallas, Texas	Moody Coliseum; Dallas Memorial Auditorium	8,998; 9,815
Western	Denver Rockets	Denver, Colorado	Denver Auditorium Arena	6,841
Western	Indiana Pacers	Indianapolis, Indiana	Indiana State Fair Coliseum	10,000
Western	San Diego Conquistadors	San Diego, California	Peterson Gym	3,668
Western	Utah Stars	Salt Lake City, Utah	Salt Palace	12,166

=== Map of teams ===
Eastern Division Western Division

== Final standings ==
=== Eastern Division ===
Team	W	L	PCT.	GB
Carolina Cougars *	57	27	.679	—
Kentucky Colonels *	56	28	.667	1
Virginia Squires *	42	42	.500	15
New York Nets *	30	54	.357	27
Memphis Tams	24	60	.286	33

=== Western Division ===
Team	W	L	PCT.	GB
Utah Stars *	55	29	.655	—
**Indiana Pacers** *	51	33	.607	4
Denver Rockets *	47	37	.560	8
San Diego Conquistadors *	30	54	.357	25
Dallas Chaparrals	28	56	.333	27

Asterisk (*) denotes playoff team

Bold – ABA champions

== Awards and honors ==
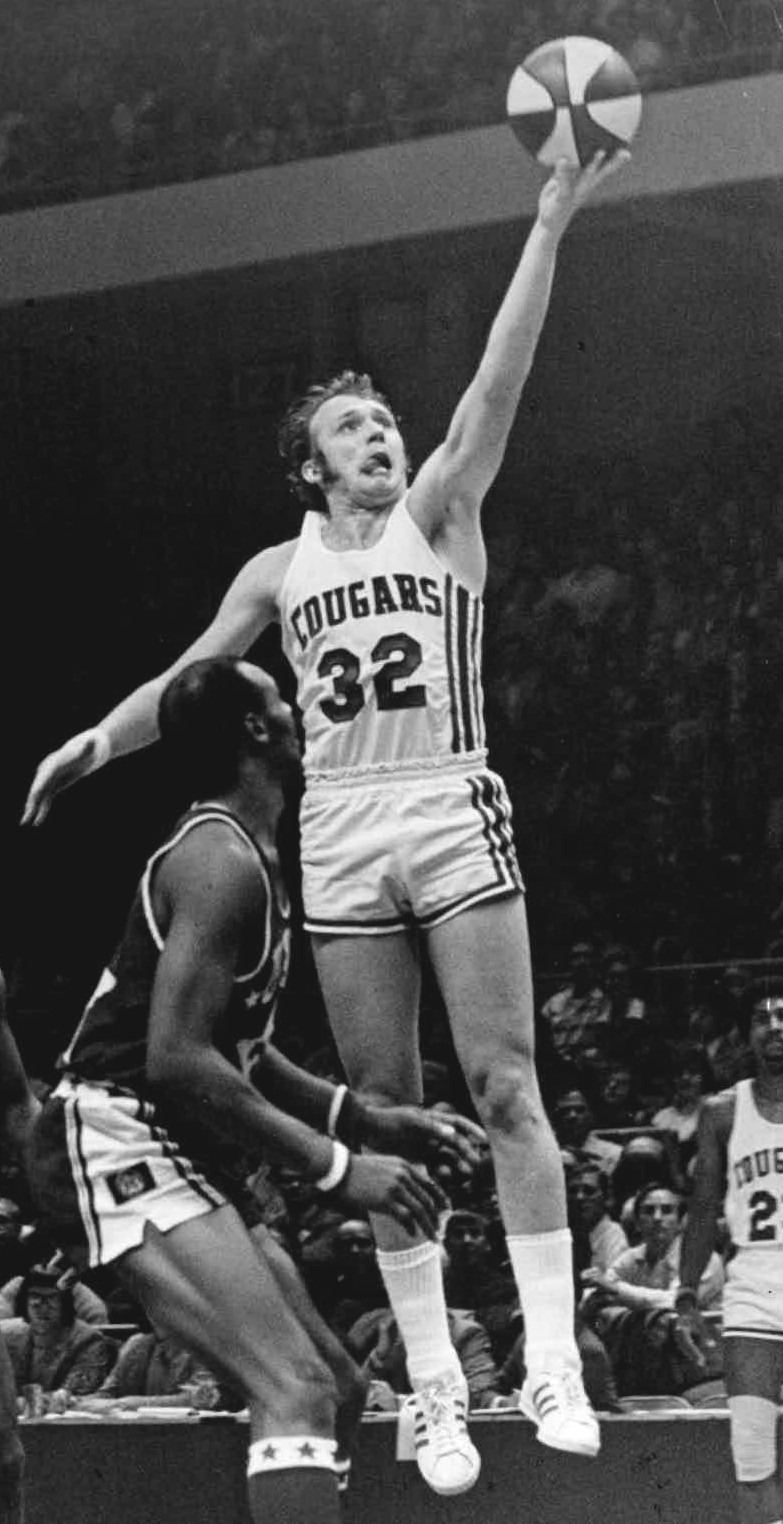
Billy Cunningham (Carolina) was named ABA MVP

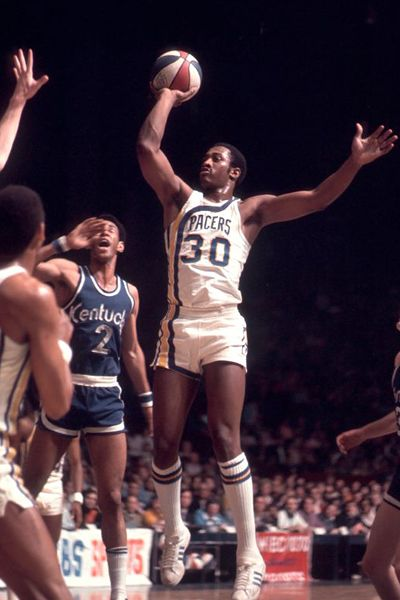
George McGinnis (Indiana) was named Playoffs MVP

- ABA Most Valuable Player Award: Billy Cunningham, Carolina Cougars
- Rookie of the Year: Brian Taylor, New York Nets
- Coach of the Year: Larry Brown, Carolina Cougars
- Playoffs MVP: George McGinnis, Indiana Pacers
- All-Star Game MVP: Warren Jabali, Denver Rockets
- Executive of the Year: Carl Scheer, Carolina Cougars
- **All-ABA First Team**
  - Billy Cunningham, Carolina Cougars
  - Julius Erving, Virginia Squires (1st First Team selection, 2nd overall selection)
  - Artis Gilmore, Kentucky Colonels (2nd selection)
  - Jimmy Jones, Utah Stars
  - Warren Jabali, Denver Rockets
- **All-ABA Second Team**
  - George McGinnis, Indiana Pacers
  - Dan Issel, Kentucky Colonels (2nd Second Team selection, 3rd overall selection)
  - Mel Daniels, Indiana Pacers (1st Second Team selection, 5th overall selection)
  - Ralph Simpson, Denver Rockets (2nd selection)
  - Mack Calvin, Carolina Cougars (1st Second Team selection, 2nd overall selection)
- **All-Defensive Team** (beginning with this season)
  - Joe Caldwell, Carolina Cougars
  - Mike Gale, Kentucky Colonels
  - Julius Keye, Denver Rockets
  - Roland Taylor, Virginia Squires
  - Willie Wise, Utah Stars
- **All-Rookie Team**
  - Jim Chones, New York Nets
  - George Gervin, Virginia Squires
  - James Silas, Dallas Chaparrals
  - Brian Taylor, New York Nets
  - Dennis Wuycik, Carolina Cougars
