= Leonard Bloom =

Former sports and entertainment owner

Leonard Bloom is a former sports and entertainment owner and real estate developer in California.

== Sports ==
=== ABA / NBA Merger ===
The American Basketball Association (that later merged with the NBA) awarded Dr. Leonard Bloom the franchise to San Diego for an entry fee of $1 million. Leonard Bloom, President and CEO of United States Capital Corporation, was the team's sole owner. Bloom named the team the San Diego Conquistadors.

The ABA purchased the San Diego Conquistadors franchise from Dr. Bloom for an undisclosed amount to enable the ABA merger with the NBA. The San Diego Clippers originated from the Buffalo Braves in the 1978-79 NBA season and had no connection to Dr. Bloom's San Diego Conquistadors/Sails, which ceased operations during the 1975-76 ABA season.

=== WHA / NHL Merger ===
In addition to owning the San Diego Basketball franchise, Leonard Bloom also owned the Los Angeles Sharks Hockey Team in the WHA (World Hockey Association) that later merged with the NHL in 1979. The Sharks played all of their home hockey games at the Los Angeles Memorial Sports Arena. Dr. Bloom renovated the Los Angeles Memorial Sports Arena to accommodate his hockey team. The Los Angeles Sharks franchise has no connection with the present day San Jose Sharks, an NHL expansion franchise begun in 1991, 12 years after the WHA ceased operations.

=== Co-Founder / Owner- World Team Tennis League (WTT) ===
The World Team Tennis (WTT) Professional Tennis league was founded in 1973 by four people: Larry King (owner of San Francisco Golden Gaters), Dr. Leonard Bloom (original owner of the San Diego Swingers, owner of the ABA San Diego Conquistadors, and owner of the WHA Los Angeles Sharks) with Dennis Murphy (founder of the World Hockey Association), and Jordan Kaiser.

The WTT was organized and started with Billie Jean King securing the professional tennis players on the women's side. Dr. Bloom, along with Wilt Chamberlain and Arthur Ashe, secured the professional players on the men's side.

Leonard Bloom was one of the original founders of World Team Tennis (WTT) with Billie Jean King and Dennis Murphy. Bloom was the founder / owner of the San Diego Swingers WTT franchise.

== Sports & entertainment venues ==
Dr. Bloom has been the sole owner and operator sports and entertainment facilities in San Francisco, San Diego, La Mesa and Fort Lauderdale.

== Ticketing ==
Leonard Bloom owned & operated one of the largest and most profitable ticketing companies in the United States called Bass Tickets. Certain rights and locations were later purchased by Ticketmaster.

== Entertainment ==
Leonard Bloom is the CEO and sole owner of Marquee Entertainment Corporation. For many years, Leonard Bloom's Marquee Entertainment Corporation has contracted and in many cases managed the top entertainers in the country for performances in Bloom-owned venues and for national and international tours.
