= Albany State Golden Rams =

- University: Albany State University
- Nickname: Golden Rams
- NCAA: Division II
- Conference: SIAC (primary); Peach Belt (women's soccer)
- Athletic director: Dr. Kristene Kelly
- Location: Albany, Georgia
- Varsity teams: 12 (4 men's, 7 women's, 1 co-ed)
- Football stadium: Albany State University Coliseum
- Baseball stadium: West Campus Baseball Field
- Softball stadium: West Campus Softball Field
- Soccer stadium: ASU Soccer Complex
- Aquatics center: Albany State Aquatics
- Tennis venue: Albany State Tennis Complex
- Colors: Royal blue and gold
- Website: asugoldenrams.com

The Albany State Golden Rams are the athletic sports teams for Albany State University, located in Albany, Georgia, in NCAA Division II intercollegiate sports. The Golden Rams compete as members of the Southern Intercollegiate Athletic Conference (SIAC). Starting Fall 2019, Women's soccer will be competing as an associate member in the Peach Belt Conference (PBC).

== Sports sponsored ==
A member of the Southern Intercollegiate Athletic Conference, Albany State University sponsors teams in four men's and seven women's NCAA sanctioned sports.

Men's sports	Women's sports
Baseball	Basketball
Basketball	Cross country
Football	Soccer
Track and field	Softball
	Tennis
	Track and field
	Volleyball
4 Men’s and 7 Women’s Sports Sponsored

== Championships ==
=== SIAC ===
- Baseball (1991 • 1994 • 2000 · 2001 · 2002 · 2003 · 2004 • 2006 • 2010 • 2015 • 2018)
- Men's Basketball (1973 • 1983 · 1984 · 1985 • 1992 • 1997 • 2007)
- Women's Basketball (1980 • 1981 • 1987 • 1989 • 1990, 1996 • 1998 • 2015
- Men's Cross Country (1976 • 1977 • 1979 • 1980 · 1981 · 1982 · 1983 · 1984 · 1985 · 1986)
- Women's Cross Country (1982 • 1998 • 2004 · 2005 · 2006 · 2007 · 2008 • 2010)
- Football (1984 · 1985 · 1986 • 1988 • 1993 · 1994 · 1995 · 1996 · 1997 • 2003 · 2004 · 2005 · 2006 • 2010 • 2013 • 2021)
- Softball (2005 • 2007 • 2008 • 2010 • 2013 • 2018)
- Women's Tennis (2010)
- Men's Track and Field (1972 · 1973 · 1974 · 1975 · 1976 · 1977 · 1978 • 1980 · 1981 · 1982 · 1983 · 1984 · 1985 · 1986 ·1987 • 2003 · 2004 · 2005 • 2014)
- Women's Track and Field (1997 • 1999 · 2000 • 2005 · 2006 · 2007 · 2008 · 2009 • 2011 • 2012 • 2014)
- Women's Volleyball (1998 • 2001 · 2002 · 2003 · 2004 · 2005 · 2006 · 2007 · 2008 · 2009)
- Men's Golf (2017 • 2018)

=== SEAC ===
Football (1955 • 1957 • 1959 • 1960 • 1962 • 1966)

=== Black college national championships ===
- Football (2003, 2004, 2010)
- Baseball (2018)

== Notable alumni ==
- Thuto Ramafifi - Botswana international
