= San Diego Conquistadors =

Defunct basketball team

- Nickname: The Q's
- Division: Western Division
- Founded: 1972
- Folded: 1975
- History: San Diego Conquistadors; 1972–1975; San Diego Sails; 1975
- Arena: Peterson Gymnasium (1972–73); Golden Hall (1973–74); San Diego Sports Arena (1974–75)
- Location: San Diego, California
- Team colors: Gold and Red (1972–1975) Ocean Cap White, Royal Blue, and Kelly Green (1975)
- Head coach: K. C. Jones (1972–73) Wilt Chamberlain (1973–74); Alex Groza & Beryl Shipley (1974–75) Bill Musselman (1975)
- Ownership: Leonard Bloom (1972–75) Frank Goldberg & Bud Fischer (1975)
- Championships: None

The San Diego Conquistadors (known as the San Diego Sails in their final, partial season) were a professional basketball team based in San Diego, California, that competed in the American Basketball Association (ABA). The "Q's", as they were popularly known, played from 1972 to 1975. As the Sails, they played an incomplete season only, beginning the 1975–1976 season but folding after only 11 games with three wins and eight losses.

== History ==
=== San Diego Conquistadors ===
The franchise was founded by Leonard Bloom in 1972 as the ABA's first — and as it turned out, only — expansion team. They would unintentionally replace both The Floridians and Pittsburgh Condors franchises, who folded earlier that same year, since both teams initially sought after San Diego as a potential relocation site for survival before ultimately folding operations on their ends. On August 7, 1972, Bloom announced the team would be named the Conquistadors, complete with a profile of Juan Rodríguez Cabrillo, who had landed on the San Diego Bay on September 28, 1542.

The new team was slated to play at the San Diego Sports Arena, but a feud between Bloom and Peter Graham, the operator and lease-holder of the city-owned 14,400-seat arena, led Graham to lock the newborn team out of the facility for two years. Graham was reportedly upset about Bloom being awarded the ABA expansion team he had also sought after himself. By the time the conflict was resolved in the fall of 1974, it was too late for a weakened franchise that had been forced to play, in the interim, at bandboxed Peterson Gymnasium (3,200 seats) on the campus of San Diego State University, and Golden Hall, a multipurpose facility in downtown.

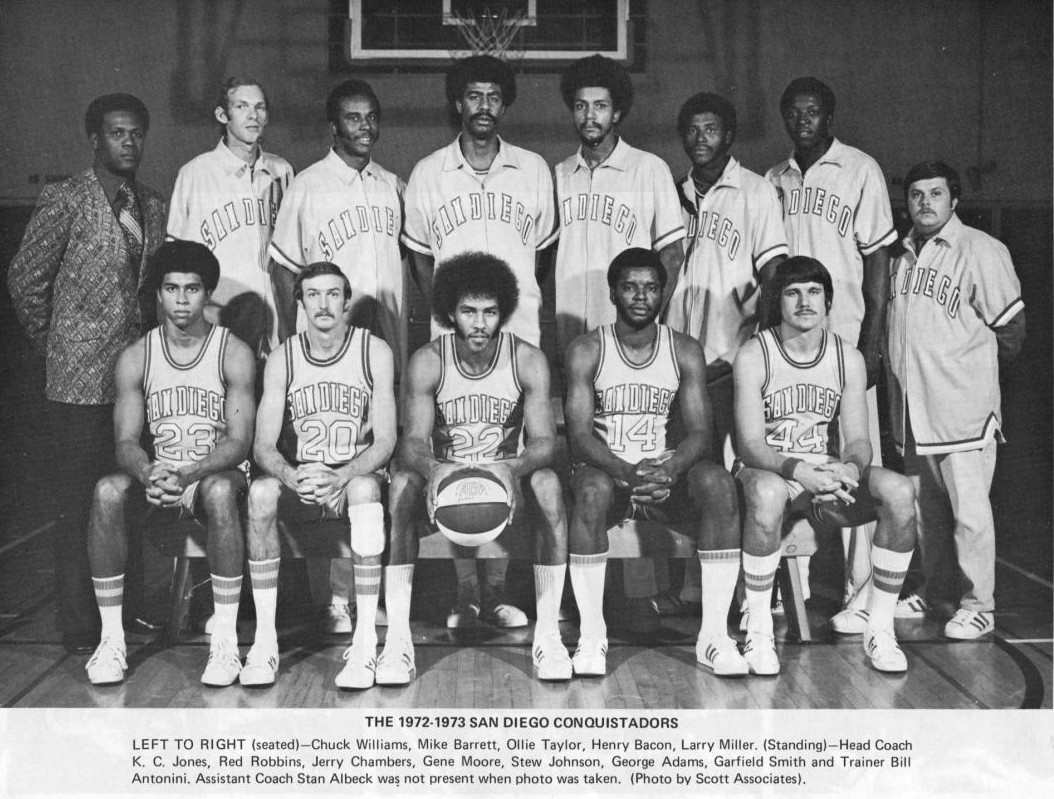
The 1972–73 San Diego Conquistadors

After reaching the 1973 ABA playoffs in their inaugural season, the Q's seemingly pulled off a coup by paying center Wilt Chamberlain $600,000 to become their player-coach. But the Los Angeles Lakers sued to block their former star from playing for his new team. Relegated to a sideline role, Chamberlain was reduced to an indifferent, 7-foot-1-inch sideshow who once skipped a game in favor of an autograph session for his recently published autobiography. His fill-in, on that and other occasions, was assistant Stan Albeck, who later skippered the Chicago Bulls, San Antonio Spurs, and New Jersey Nets of the National Basketball Association (NBA). Even when Chamberlain was on hand, he mostly left the Q's in Albeck's hands.

Nonetheless, the team again reached the postseason, bowing out in the first round, for the second year in a row, in the 1974 ABA playoffs.

The season, however, was overshadowed by the arena situation. Frustrated with his inability to get a lease for the Sports Arena, Bloom announced plans for a 20,000-seat arena in Chula Vista. However, a referendum on the arena, held just after the season started, failed by only 294 votes. League officials then ordered Bloom to take preliminary steps toward moving to Los Angeles, in hopes of returning to a market abandoned by the Utah Stars four years earlier.

For their third season in 1974–75, the Conquistadors lost Chamberlain, but finally gained a lease in the Sports Arena. But without Chamberlain as a gate attraction, the team was roundly ignored by San Diegans, and placed last in the Western Division, missing the 1975 ABA playoffs.

=== San Diego Sails ===
Bloom sold the franchise during the summer of 1975 to Frank Goldberg and his partner Bud Fischer, who had been involved with co-ownership of the successful Denver Nuggets franchise. Goldberg started anew, renaming the team the San Diego Sails and hiring former University of Minnesota coach Bill Musselman. They hired Iry Kaze as general manager. With a completely different roster, color scheme, set of uniforms, and just about everything else, the re-branded Sails sought to repeat Denver's turnaround a season earlier from mediocrity to championship contender.

But the Sails attracted just 3,060 fans to their home opener on October 24, 1975 – a loss to the Nuggets – and fan attendance rapidly dwindled further as the team limped to a 3–8 start; only 1,670 showed up for San Diego's third (and ultimately last) home game, against the San Antonio Spurs. Goldberg soon learned San Diego was to be shut out of the pending ABA–NBA merger, reportedly due to the insistence of Lakers owner Jack Kent Cooke, who refused to share his Southern California fan base with a team to the south.

With the team lacking fan support or a long-term future, Goldberg folded the franchise on November 12. The ABA, which planned to start the season with ten teams before having the Baltimore Claws fold operations after three exhibition games, saw its number drop to eight with the Sails' failure; on December 2, the Utah Stars also disbanded following failed merger talks with the Spirits of St. Louis, cutting the league to seven teams and forcing the ABA to shrink its original two-division setup to just one division where the five best teams would eventually meet up in the 1976 ABA playoffs by the conclusion of the regular season.

Musselman was surprised by the move while Kaze later sued the owners for owed money.

=== The ABA's demise and later San Diego basketball ===
The moribund state of the last-place Virginia Squires, who folded after the regular season ended but before the 1976 ABA playoffs concluded, left the ABA with only six teams and forced the league to seek a merger with the more established NBA, which absorbed four of the six remaining teams with the Indiana Pacers, New York Nets, Denver Nuggets and San Antonio Spurs joining the NBA, while the owners of the Kentucky Colonels and 6th place Spirits of St. Louis were paid off and folded their franchises.

In 1978, the NBA's Buffalo Braves arrived in San Diego as the San Diego Clippers; in 1984, they moved up the coast to become the Los Angeles Clippers. San Diego has not had another major-league pro basketball team since. A couple of minor-league hoops teams have called the city home: the Continental Basketball Association's San Diego Wildcards, who folded after only 21 games in 1996, and the International Basketball League's San Diego Stingrays, who played from 1999 to 2001. San Diego has also had various franchises in the semi-pro, 21st century American Basketball Association, such as the B-Kings, Sol, Surf, Wildcats and Wildfire.

== Basketball Hall of Famers ==
San Diego Conquistadors/Sails Hall of Famers
Coaches
Name	Position	Tenure	Inducted
Wilt Chamberlain ^{1}	Head coach	1973–1974	1978
K.C. Jones ^{1}	Head coach	1972–1973	1989

Notes:

- ^{1} Inducted as a player.

== Season-by-season ==
ABA champions	ABA finalists	Division champions	Playoff berth

Season	League	Division	Finish	W	L	Win%	Playoffs	Awards
San Diego Conquistadors
1972–73	ABA	Western	4th	30	54	.357	Lost Division Semifinals (Stars) 0–4	—
1973–74	ABA	Western	4th	37	47	.440	Lost Division Semifinals (Stars) 2–4	—
1974–75	ABA	Western	5th	31	53	.369	Did not qualify	
San Diego Sails
1975–76	ABA	Western		3	8	.273	(team folded)	—
