= 1973 ABA draft =

Basketball player selection

General information
- Sport: Basketball
- Dates: January 15, 1973 (Special Circumstances Draft); April 25, 1973 (Senior Draft & Undergraduate Draft); May 18, 1973 (Supplemental Draft)
- Location: New York, New York

Overview
- 212 total selections in 29 (overall) rounds
- League: American Basketball Association
- Teams: 10 (excluding one team relocating and rebranding as another team during the draft process)
- First selection: Mike Bantom, Denver Rockets (Special Circumstances Draft); Bo Lamar, San Diego Conquistadors (Senior Draft); Bill Walton, San Diego Conquistadors (Undergraduate Draft); Larry Moore, San Diego Conquistadors (Supplemental Draft)

The 1973 ABA draft was the seventh draft done by the American Basketball Association (ABA), a rivaling professional basketball league to the National Basketball Association (NBA) that they would eventually merge as a part of the NBA only a few years later despite official merger talks ultimately being dead during these later, more competitive years of the ABA's history.

This draft would be the only draft in the league's history where they would experiment with the format by utilizing four different types of drafts from the months of January until May 1973, with the draft that had the most rounds showcasing the least amount of success by comparison to the other drafts in question due to most of the players that were drafted there not even playing professionally at all after being selected in the final draft done in this period of time. The first draft done on January 15 that year was for the Special Circumstances Draft, which focused on players that the ABA saw were eligible for selection early either as college underclassmen or as an early (semi-)professional player of sorts in the case of George Gervin, with the ordering on that two round draft being done around the midway point of sorts for the 1972–73 ABA season and Mike Bantom being the #1 pick of the Denver Rockets (who still kept the team name of Rockets at the time despite no longer having Bill Ringsby owning the team and having it coincide with his "Ringsby Rocket Truck Lines" company) for that draft.

It also became the final draft of sorts that the Dallas Chaparrals would participate in under that name, as following the conclusion of that aforementioned season, the team would move from Dallas to San Antonio to become the modern-day San Antonio Spurs going forward (though they did initially try and utilize the San Antonio Gunslingers name at first instead, which they might have used during this draft period in April and May). Following that, the ABA did both the ten round Senior Draft and then the two round Undergraduate Draft on April 25 (starting them both one day after the rivaling NBA began their draft period, thus technically marking the first time the NBA draft started before an ABA draft did), with both Bo Lamar and Bill Walton of the San Diego Conquistadors being considered the official #1 picks of those respective drafts.

Finally, on May 18, thirteen days after the NBA completed their general draft period (which was technically the first time the NBA completed a draft period of sorts ahead of the ABA as well), the ABA utilized a fifteen round Supplemental Draft that only eight of the ten ABA teams participated in altogether, which saw Larry Moore of the San Diego Conquistadors become the presumed #1 pick of that specific draft, though he was the only #1 pick from an ABA draft to not have a professional career altogether. The first three drafts would see players that had genuine success throughout both the ABA and NBA in their careers (though the drafts with the lowest overall number of picks saw the most success of the lot by comparison to the Senior Draft), but the last draft saw mostly failures there that never played professionally with scant few professional successes like Slick Watts and Harvey Catchings alongside brief professional careers like John Coughran, James Garvin, Billy Harris, and Wayne Pack (the latter two players being the only players from that last draft to even play in the ABA altogether) instead.

== Draftee career notes ==
Due to the unique circumstances relating to this draft, it can be accurate to say that the ABA had four different #1 picks for the different drafts they utilized instead of just one standardized #1 pick like the NBA did for the 1973 NBA draft (which was also the former fourth round (presumed #30) ABA pick Doug Collins from Illinois State University from the 1972 ABA draft alongside the fourth pick of the Senior Draft for this year's ABA draft). For the #1 pick of the Special Circumstances Draft, Mike Bantom from St. Joseph's University was selected as the first pick of that draft by the Denver Rockets due to them having the worst record by that period of time (with him also being the 8th pick of the 1973 NBA draft by the Phoenix Suns). Meanwhile, the #1 pick that's considered the consensus #1 pick of the 1973 ABA draft due to him being that for the ABA's senior draft was Bo Lamar of the newly created San Diego Conquistadors expansion franchise (who was drafted 44th in the 1973 NBA draft by comparison). For the undergraduate draft that came right after the senior draft, that particular draft's #1 pick (which officially is referred to as the 101st pick of that particular day's draft since the senior and undergraduate drafts were back to back with each other) was Bill Walton (who was previously selected by the Dallas Chaparrals in the fourth round as the presumed 33rd pick of the 1972 ABA draft) from UCLA by the San Diego Conquistadors.

Finally, for the Supplemental Draft that came by in May, the presumed #1 pick of that specific draft was Larry Moore from the University of Texas in Arlington by the San Diego Conquistadors due to them being the holders of the #1 pick in the previous two drafts, though he not only wouldn't be drafted by the NBA, but none of the players selected in the first round from that specific draft would play professionally at all whatsoever (though Craig Littlepage from the University of Pennsylvania by the San Antonio Spurs would eventually be a college basketball head coach and later athletic director after being a long-time assistant coach following his draft selection). Meanwhile, Bo Lamar would be named a member of the All-ABA Rookie Team in his first season in the ABA before fizzling out of his professional basketball career, Mike Bantom would be a part of the All-NBA Rookie Team in his career before having a more sustainable professional basketball career by comparison to Bo Lamar, Doug Collins would later become a four-time NBA All-Star before coaching in the NBA later in his career, and Bill Walton ultimately would make it to the Naismith Basketball Hall of Fame for his overall career.

From the Special Circumstances Draft, three players from that specific draft would be a part of the Naismith Basketball Hall of Fame. Freshman #8 pick Robert Parish from Centenary College, former Eastern Michigan University sophomore (and at the time original Continental Basketball Association's Pontiac Chaparrals (no relation to the Dallas Chaparrals franchise that later became the San Antonio Spurs)) #10 pick George Gervin, and junior #11 pick Bobby Jones from the University of North Carolina would all make it to the Hall of Fame, with Gervin and Jones both playing in the ABA during their careers.

For the Senior Draft, it'd also recently see three players inducted into the Hall of Fame by as recently as 2026 in #3 pick Mike D'Antoni from Marshall University (as a contributor), #40 pick Krešimir Ćosić from Brigham Young University (as a foreign player), and #51 pick George Karl from the University of North Carolina (as a head coach), with only D'Antoni playing in the ABA from that group. The only other interesting notable player from the senior draft was #58 pick Dave Winfield, who was the only player to get drafted in all four of the ABA, NBA, NFL, and MLB, with Winfield choosing to play in the MLB's San Diego Padres and later went into the Baseball Hall of Fame for his efforts with that league.

Finally, the Undergraduate Draft would not just see the aforementioned #101 pick in junior Bill Walton from UCLA, but also sophomore #102 pick David Thompson from North Carolina State University make it to the Hall of Fame for their professional careers at hand. After that point, the Supplemental Draft would see nobody from this specific draft make it to the Hall of Fame (with this particular draft seeing scant few successes playing either in the ABA or NBA altogether), though the last pick from that draft in junior Harvey Catchings from Hardin–Simmons University (who was also drafted by the Utah Stars in the previous year's draft) would be the father of Hall of Fame WNBA star player Tamika Catchings. A few of the Hall of Famers from this year's draft would also play in the ABA All-Star Game at least once as well.

Of the 92 overall ABA All-Stars, only eight total players would make it to at least one ABA All-Star Game during the league's final seasons of existence, with two of them making it to all three of the league's final All-Star Games (none of them being from the Supplemental Draft). From the Special Circumstances Draft, four players from this specific draft would be in the ABA All-Star Game, with #2 pick Mike Green being an All-Star in 1975 after being a member of the ABA All-Rookie Team in 1974, #4 pick Larry Kenon being one of two three-time ABA All-Stars from this draft alongside an ABA All-Rookie Team member and champion in 1974, #10 pick George Gervin being the other three-time ABA All-Star from this draft that was a late ABA All-Rookie Team member for 1973 due to his prior semi-professional status at the original Continental Basketball Association making him eligible for early ABA play and a two-time All-ABA Second Team member in the league's final two seasons of play for a worthwhile ABA All-Time Team spot and a later number retirement for the San Antonio Spurs, and #11 pick Bobby Jones being an ABA All-Star and an All-ABA Second Team member in the league's final season of play after being named a member of the ABA All-Rookie Team in 1975 due to him joining the ABA during the following season instead, as well as one of seven ABA players to join the ABA All-Defensive Team only two times throughout one's playing career there. For the Senior Draft, only #25 pick Caldwell Jones would play well enough to make it to the ABA All-Star Game out of everyone that was from that specific draft, with him making it in 1975 due in part to leading the league in blocks for two straight seasons in a row in both 1974 and 1975.

Finally, with regards to the Undergraduate Draft that came right after the Senior Draft, that draft saw three players selected that would be ABA All-Stars, with the technical #102 pick David Thompson being a part of the ABA All-Time Team despite only one season of play in the ABA's final season of existence with him earning not just the final year's All-Star Game spot, but also the final ABA All-Star Game MVP Award; the final ABA Rookie of the Year Award alongside one of the final ABA All-Rookie Team spots, and even one of the final All-ABA Second Team spots in his only season of play with the ABA; the technical #106 pick Marvin Barnes also being a part of the ABA All-Time Team in only two seasons of play with two ABA All-Star Game appearances alongside him winning the ABA's Rookie of the Year Award in 1975 and appearing in both the ABA All-Rookie Team and All-ABA Second Team in that same first year of ABA play; and the technical #110 pick Maurice Lucas was the fourth overall player from this year's draft (third player from this specific draft in question) to also be named a member of the ABA All-Time Team while playing in only two seasons despite having only one ABA All-Star appearance in the league's final season of play (being named as such by replacing one of three players representing the Denver Nuggets, the modern-day rendition of the Denver Rockets that year, with most of his notable achievements as a player coming from after the ABA-NBA merger). Due in part to the high amount of drafted players the ABA had this season combined with the overall amount of seasons the ABA had left to actually play, there would actually be no undrafted ABA All-Stars for the first time ever (at least, if you exclude Swen Nater as a previously drafted player that returned to college for his senior year, especially since he already had his player rights acquired by the Virginia Squires at the time).

== Historic draft notes ==
After mostly taking on the linear NBA draft stylized formatting for their previous two drafts, partially due to anticipation from the ABA thinking they were going to have the ABA-NBA merger planned out and settled on earlier than it actually was, the ABA decided to experiment with their formatting once again for the 1973 draft. With their experimentation, they allowed themselves to work with the return of the "Special Circumstances Draft" under a more improved model from what they first tried back in 1971 (allowing themselves to draft college underclassmen or the equivalent of such players early in the season instead of months before starting their upcoming season), which allowed for the Virginia Squires to sign George Gervin onto their team during their 1972–73 season after that draft ended in January due to his semi-professional status at the time. It also allowed the ABA to separate the seniors and the rest of the college underclassmen in their bigger draft night later in April, which gave them more of an opportunity to lure away underclassmen that wanted to play professional basketball early in their careers instead. Finally, the "Supplemental Draft" that was done in May was done with a purpose of likely finding more underrated basketball gems that were overlooked by the NBA elsewhere, though with scant few exceptions in mind for the eight out of ten ABA teams that participated in said draft during that month, that particular draft was overall deemed a failure by comparison to the other drafts done that year. If one were to combine the total rounds from all four of those drafts into one whole draft properly, this year's draft would have officially lasted for a massive 29 total rounds with the most number of players drafted by the ABA for a grand total of 212 players selected for officially recorded data. However, to simplify the process a bit in this case, this year's draft coverage will have the four drafts separated as they originally were presented at the time. Outside of the Dallas Chaparrals moving to San Antonio in order to essentially become the modern-day San Antonio Spurs that currently exist in the NBA to this day (after briefly flirting with the idea of using the San Antonio Gunslingers name early on) following the end of the regular season months after the special circumstances draft ended, no other team movement changes occurred following the conclusions of the rest of these draft events, (though the Memphis Tams were dangerously close to either relocating elsewhere themselves or otherwise folding operations entirely similar to "The Floridians" and the Pittsburgh Condors did the previous year in the ABA during the offseason period) thus tying 1971 as the most stable draft year period for the ABA's teams due to no one outside of the Chaparrals franchise moving or changing team names once again.

== Key ==
Pos.	G	F	C
Position	Guard	Forward	Center

Accomplishments key
Symbol	Meaning	Symbol	Meaning
^	Denotes player who has been inducted to the Naismith Memorial Basketball Hall of Fame	‡	Denotes player that was selected to the ABA All-Time Team
*	Denotes player who has been selected for at least one All-Star Game and All-ABA Team	+	Denotes player who has been selected for at least one All-Star Game
~	Denotes a player that won the ABA Rookie of the Year Award	#	Denotes player who has never appeared in either an ABA or NBA regular season or playoff game

== Drafts ==
Unlike the other draft years done by the ABA, this year's draft in particular would be done in four separate areas of interest. As such, each specific draft for this year will have its own section to work with instead.

=== 1973 ABA special circumstances draft ===
This specific draft would technically be considered the last draft event that the Dallas Chaparrals would participate in under that name, as well as become the first official draft that the San Diego Conquistadors would participate in outside of the previous year's expansion draft. Following the end of the 1972–73 ABA season, the Chaparrals franchise would move to San Antonio, Texas to initially be called the San Antonio Gunslingers before later entering the upcoming season onward as the San Antonio Spurs properly. As such, the San Antonio franchise would claim all of the Chaparrals franchise's assets, including franchise history and draft rights from not just this draft, but also the other drafts held later in the year. That being said, every player selected in this particular draft except for George Gervin were selected as players that the ABA had deemed necessary to be drafted early via special circumstances coming out of college or university, regardless of whether they were already close toward graduating from said college or university before this special draft began or not. In the case of George Gervin, he had actually left his college he was going to during his sophomore year in order to play minor league basketball of sorts in the originally named Continental Basketball Association for the unrelated named Pontiac Chaparrals in Pontiac, Michigan before that league was about to go defunct a year later and that league's named would be hijacked by the Eastern Basketball Association a few years after that to become that new name for the rest of its life cycle.

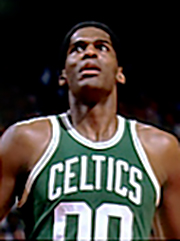
Robert Parish was the eighth pick of the 1973 ABA special circumstances draft by the Utah Stars.

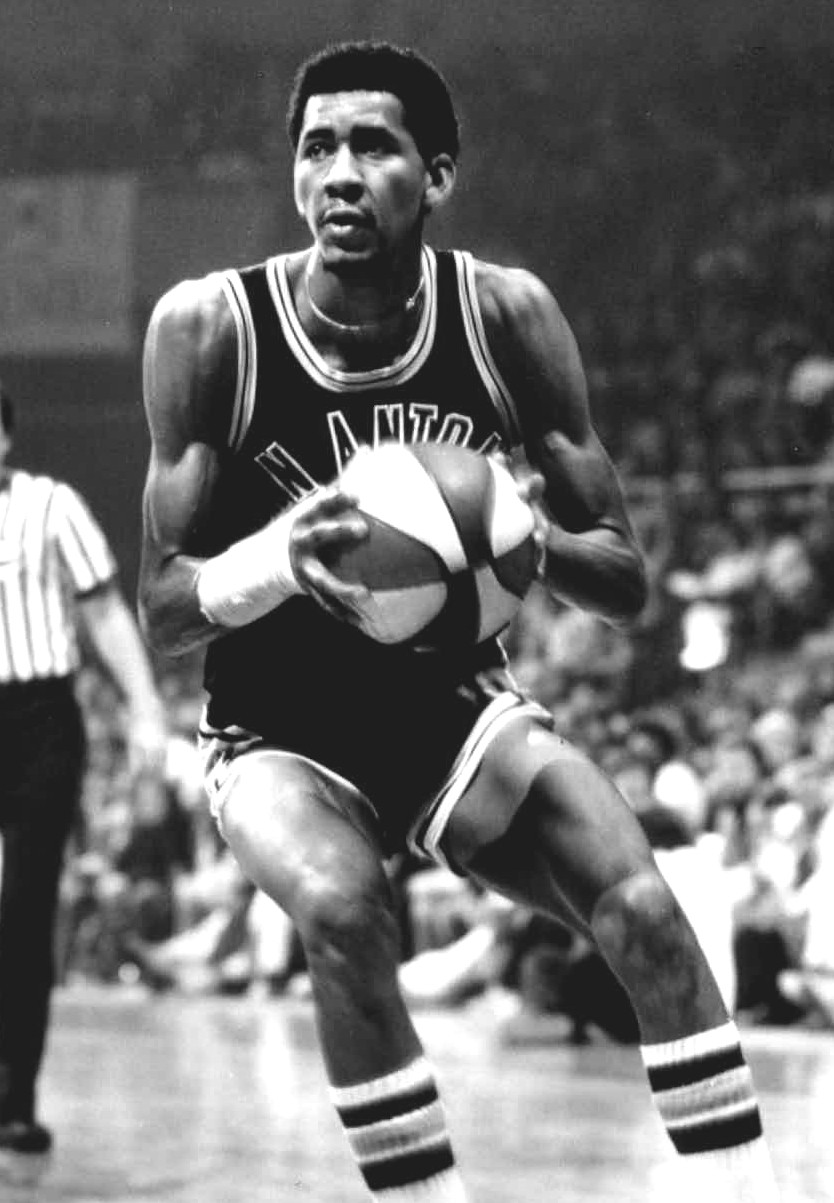
George Gervin was the tenth pick of the 1973 ABA special circumstances draft by the Virginia Squires.

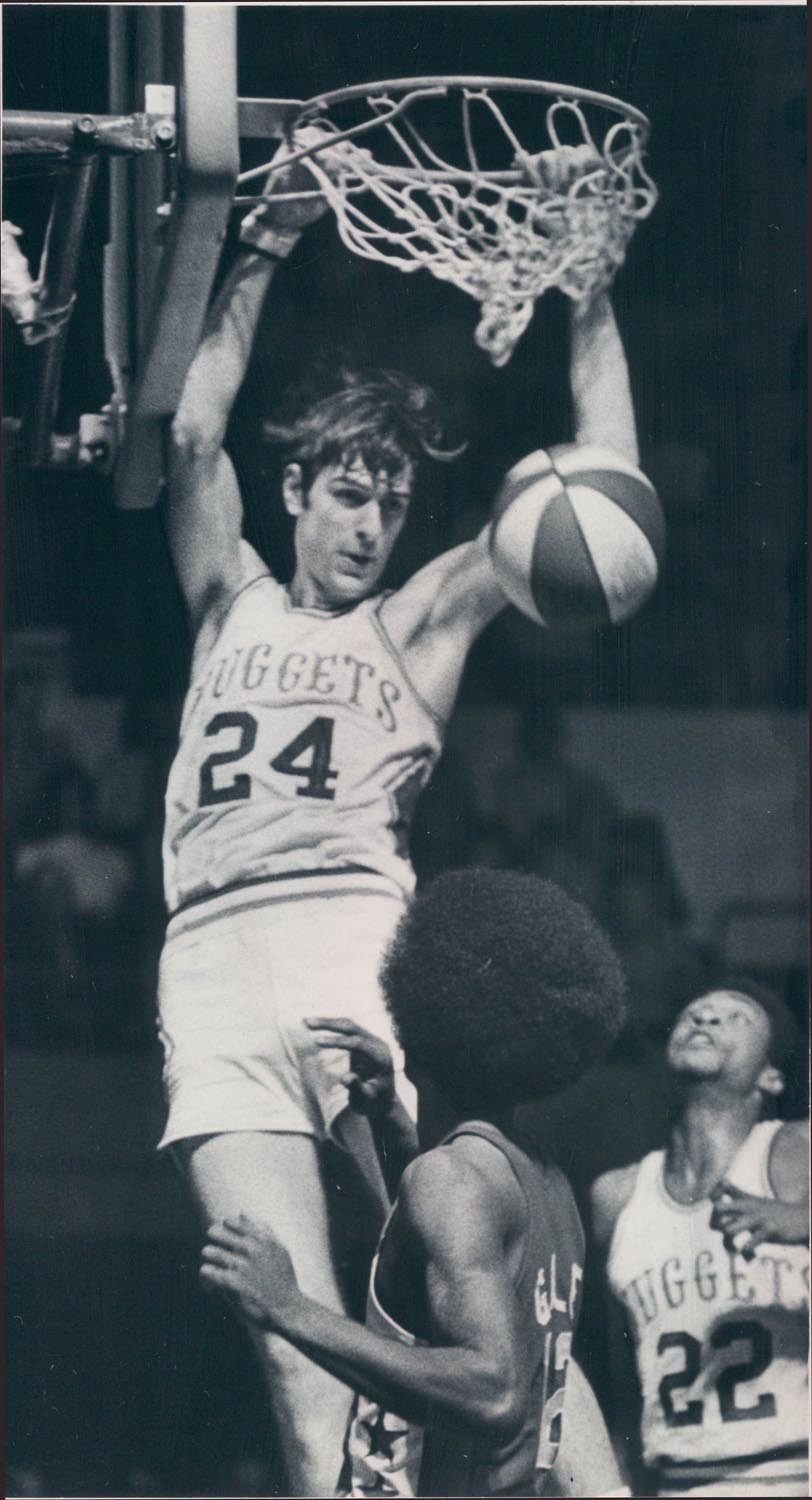
Bobby Jones (left) was the eleventh pick in the 1973 ABA special circumstances draft by the Carolina Cougars.

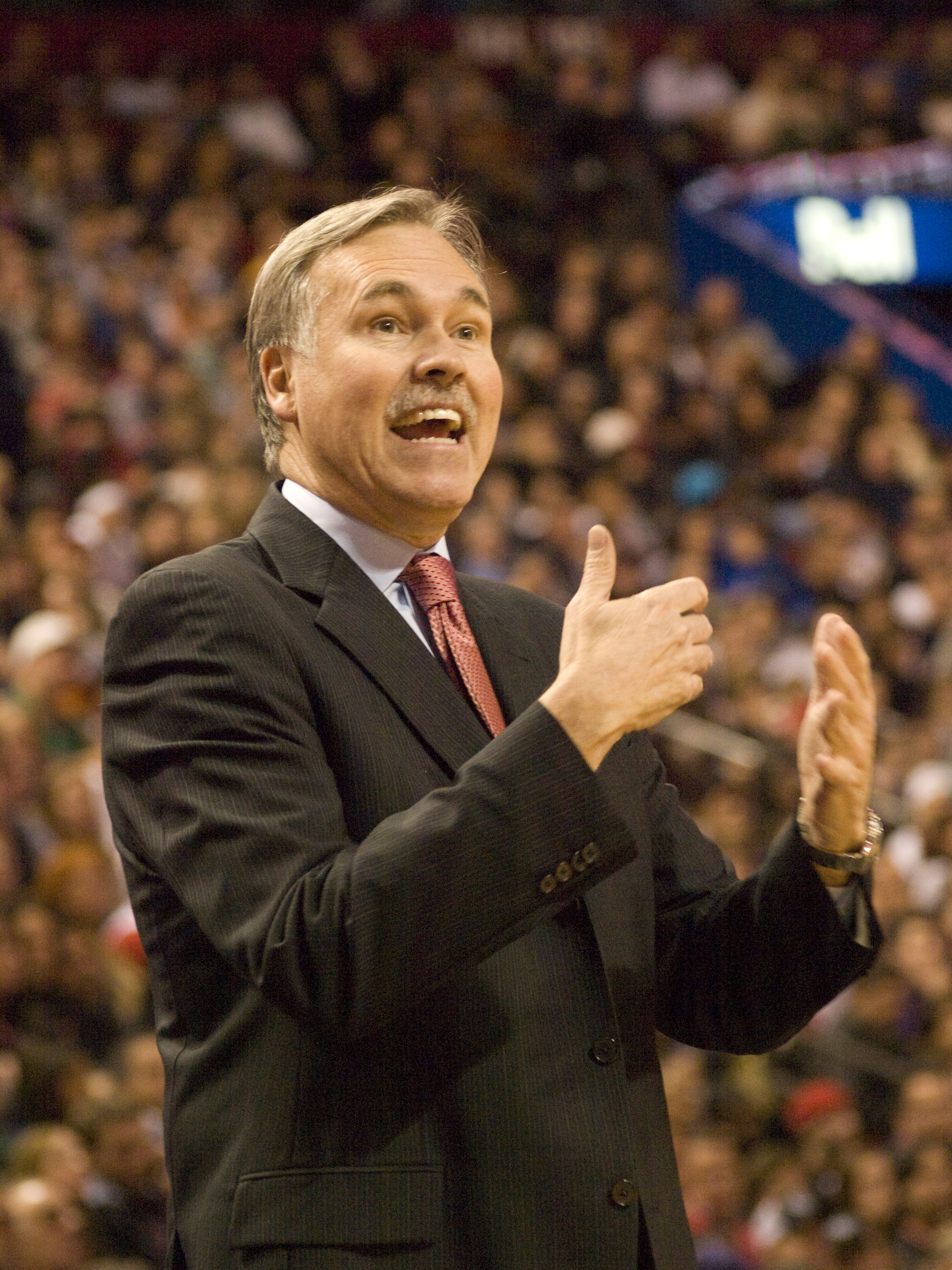
Mike D'Antoni was the third pick in the 1973 ABA senior draft by the team that originally was meant to become the San Antonio Gunslingers before they got renamed into the San Antonio Spurs properly by the start of their first season under that new team name of theirs after previously entering the 1973 ABA special circumstances draft while under their original Dallas Chaparrals team name.

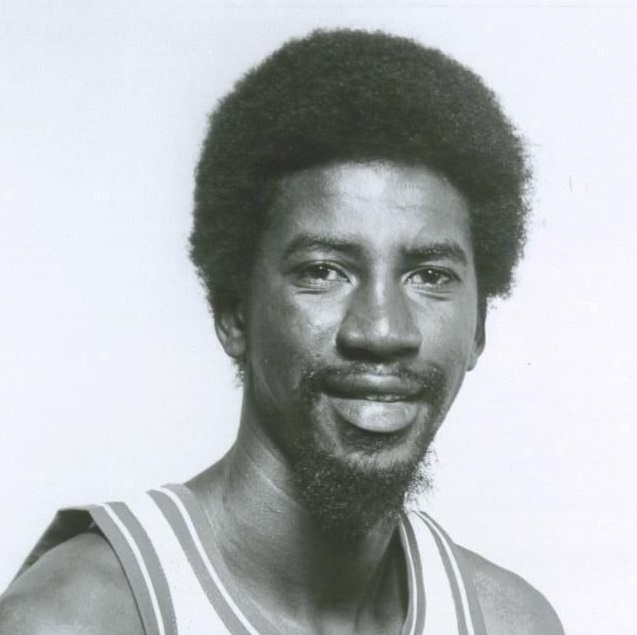
Caldwell Jones was the 25th pick in the 1973 ABA senior draft by the Virginia Squires.

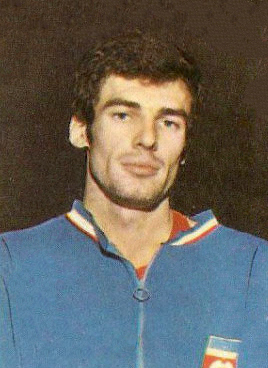
Krešimir Ćosić was the 40th pick in the 1973 ABA senior draft by the Carolina Cougars. He would later be inducted into the Naismith Basketball Hall of Fame despite never playing either in the ABA or rivaling NBA due to his time spent playing overseas in Yugoslavia.

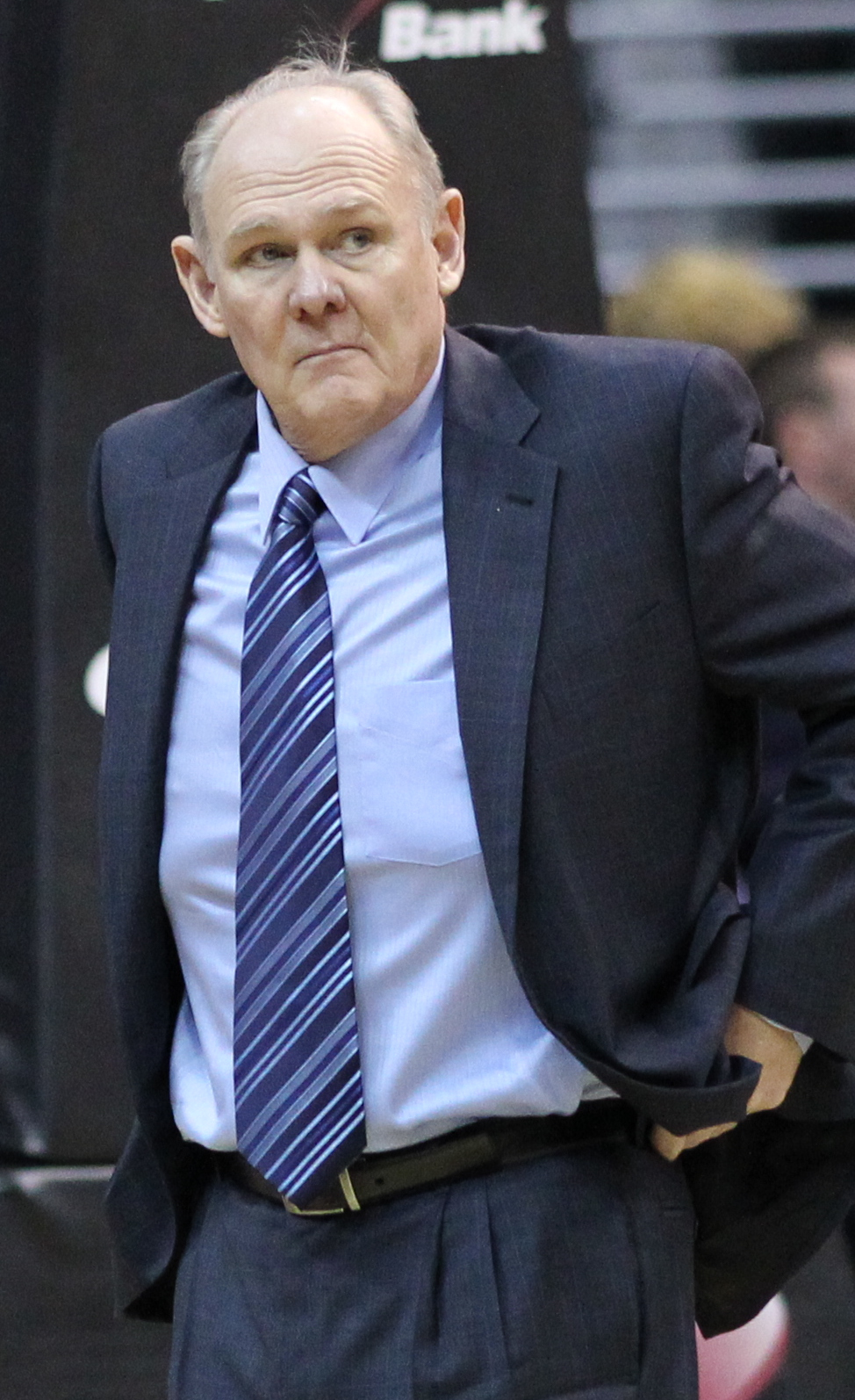
George Karl was the 51st pick of the 1973 ABA senior draft by the Memphis Tams.

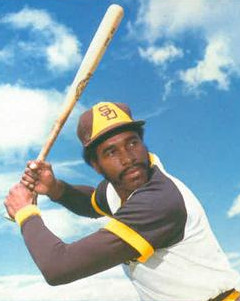
Dave Winfield was the 58th pick in the 1973 ABA senior draft by the Utah Stars. He ultimately went to the Baseball Hall of Fame due to him choosing to play in the MLB.

Round	Pick	Player	Pos.	Nationality	Team	School/Club team
1	1	Mike Bantom	PF/SF	United States	Denver Rockets	St. Joseph's (Sr.)
1	2	Mike Green^{+}	C/PF	United States	Indiana Pacers	Louisiana Tech (Sr.)
1	3	Ernie DiGregorio	PG	United States	Kentucky Colonels	Providence (Sr.)
1	4	Larry Kenon^{+}	PF	United States	Memphis Tams	Memphis State (Jr.)
1	5	Jim Brewer	PF	United States	New York Nets	Minnesota (Sr.)
1	6	Kevin Kunnert	C	United States	Dallas Chaparrals	Iowa (Sr.)
1	7	David Vaughn Jr.	C	United States	San Diego Conquistadors	Oral Roberts (So.)
1	8	Robert Parish^	C	United States	Utah Stars	Centenary (Fr.)
1	9	Jimmie Baker	PF	United States	Utah Stars	UNLV (So.)
1	10	George Gervin^‡	SG/SF	United States	Virginia Squires	Pontiac Chaparrals (CBA)
2	11	Bobby Jones^^{+}	PF	United States	Carolina Cougars	North Carolina (Jr.)
2	12	Tommy Burleson	C	United States	Carolina Cougars	NC State (Jr.)
2	13	Clyde Turner^{#}	F	United States	Denver Rockets	Minnesota (Jr.)
2	14	Dave Cowens^{#}	SF	United States	Indiana Pacers	Houston (So.)
2	15	Raymond Lewis^{#}	G	United States	Memphis Tams	Cal State Los Angeles (So.)
2	16	Billy Schaeffer	SF	United States	New York Nets	St. John's (Sr.)
2	17	John Brown	SF	United States; West Germany	Dallas Chaparrals	Missouri (Sr.)
2	18	Bird Averitt	SG	United States	San Diego Conquistadors	Pepperdine (Jr.)
2	19	Alvan Adams	PF/C	United States	Utah Stars	Oklahoma (So.)
2	20	Barry Parkhill	SG	United States	Virginia Squires	Virginia (Sr.)

=== 1973 ABA senior draft ===
For these next three draft events, the San Antonio Spurs were potentially drafting under their initial team name of the San Antonio Gunslingers at the time. They would only change their team name to the Spurs some time before the 1973–74 ABA season officially began either due to a "Name That Team" contest (though it's unknown when that contest in 1973 was officially done during that time) or by the insistence of Red McCombs, one of the new team owners, naming it after his birth place of Spur, Texas. This means this year's senior draft may or may not be the official draft debut period of the San Antonio Spurs franchise (though it retroactively is considered that officially). As for this particular draft, the focus involved would have teams draft only senior eligible players from colleges and universities for teams to potentially sign onto their teams over the rivaling NBA's teams. Ironically, a few of these players selected in this wouldn't technically be considered proper seniors for one reason or another.

Round	Pick	Player	Pos.	Nationality	Team	School
1	1	Bo Lamar	PG	United States	San Diego Conquistadors	Southwestern Louisiana (Sr.)
1	2	Larry Finch	SG	United States	Memphis Tams	Memphis State (Sr.)
1	3	Mike D'Antoni^	PG	United States; Italy	San Antonio Gunslingers/Spurs	Marshall (Sr.)
1	4	Doug Collins	SG	United States	New York Nets	Illinois State (Sr.)
1	5	Allan Bristow	SF	United States	Virginia Squires	Virginia Tech (Sr.)
1	6	Ed Ratleff	SG/SF	United States	Denver Rockets	Long Beach State (Sr.)
1	7	Steve Downing	C	United States	Indiana Pacers	Indiana (Sr.)
1	8	Ronnie Robinson	PF	United States	Utah Stars	Memphis State (Sr.)
1	9	Louie Nelson	PG/SG	United States	Kentucky Colonels	Washington (Sr.)
1	10	Mel Davis	PF	United States	Carolina Cougars	St. John's (Sr.)
2	11	Wendell Hudson^{#}	F	United States	Memphis Tams	Alabama (Sr.)
2	12	Kevin Joyce	PG/SG	United States	San Antonio Gunslingers/Spurs	South Carolina (Sr.)
2	13	Tim Bassett	PF/C	United States	San Diego Conquistadors	Georgia (Sr.)
2	14	Derrek Dickey	PF	United States	Kentucky Colonels (from New York via Utah)	Cincinnati (Sr.)
2	15	Allie McGuire	SG	United States	Virginia Squires	Marquette (Sr.)
2	16	Steve Mitchell^{#}	F	United States	Denver Rockets	Kansas State (Sr.)
2	17	Jim O'Brien	SF/SG	United States	Indiana Pacers	Maryland (Sr.)
2	18	Leonard Gray	PF	United States	Utah Stars	Long Beach State (Sr.)
2	19	Ron King	SG	United States	Kentucky Colonels	Florida State (Sr.)
2	20	Nick Weatherspoon	SF	United States	Carolina Cougars	Illinois (Sr.)
3	21	Dave Langston^{#}	G	United States	Memphis Tams	Drake (Sr.)
3	22	Tom Kozelko	PF	United States	San Antonio Gunslingers/Spurs	Toledo (Sr.)
3	23	Tom Ingelsby	PG	United States	San Diego Conquistadors	Villanova (Sr.)
3	24	James Lister^{#}	C	United States	New York Nets	Sam Houston State (Sr.)
3	25	Caldwell Jones^{+}	C/PF	United States	Virginia Squires	Albany State (Sr.)
3	26	Kevin Stacom	SG	United States	Denver Rockets	Providence (Sr.)
3	27	Jim Resteck^{#}	F	United States	Indiana Pacers	Auburn (Sr.)
3	28	Steve Newsome^{#}	F	United States	Utah Stars	Houston (Sr.)
3	29	M. L. Carr	SG/SF	United States	Kentucky Colonels	Guilford (Sr.)
3	30	Ted Manakas	SG	United States	Utah Stars (from Carolina)	Princeton (Sr.)
4	31	Harry Rogers	PF	United States	Memphis Tams	Saint Louis (Sr.)
4	32	Phil Hankinson	PF	United States	New York Nets (from San Antonio)	Pennsylvania (Sr.)
4	33	Darryl Minniefield^{#}	C	United States	San Diego Conquistadors	New Mexico (Sr.)
4	34	Kermit Washington	PF	United States	New York Nets	American (Sr.)
4	35	Bob Lauriski^{#}	F	United States	Virginia Squires	Utah State (Sr.)
4	36	Patrick McFarland	SG	United States	Denver Rockets	Saint Joseph's (Sr.)
4	37	John Ritter^{#}	F	United States	Indiana Pacers	Indiana (Sr.)
4	38	Martin Terry^{#}	F	United States	Utah Stars	Arkansas (Sr.)
4	39	Ron Behagen	PF/C	United States	Kentucky Colonels	Minnesota (Sr.)
4	40	Krešimir Ćosić^{#}^	C	Yugoslavia; Croatia	Carolina Cougars	BYU (Sr.)
5	41	Dennis Bell	SF	United States	Memphis Tams	Drake (Sr.)
5	42	Luke Witte	C	United States	San Antonio Gunslingers/Spurs	Ohio State (Sr.)
5	43	Reggie Royals	C	United States	San Diego Conquistadors	Florida State (Sr.)
5	44	Ken Brady^{#}	C	United States	New York Nets	Michigan (Sr.)
5	45	Pete Perry^{#}	C	United States	Virginia Squires	Pan American (Sr.)
5	46	Larry Farmer^{#}	F	United States	Denver Rockets	UCLA (Sr.)
5	47	Allan Hornyak^{#}	SG	United States	Indiana Pacers	Ohio State (Sr.)
5	48	Pete Harris^{#}	F	United States	Utah Stars	Stephen F. Austin (Sr.)
5	49	William Harris^{#}	G	United States	Kentucky Colonels	North Carolina A&T (Sr.)
5	50	Larry Hollyfield^{#}	SG/SF	United States	Carolina Cougars	UCLA (Sr.)
6	51	George Karl^	PG	United States	Memphis Tams	North Carolina (Sr.)
6	52	Gary Melchionni	PG	United States	San Antonio Gunslingers/Spurs	Duke (Sr.)
6	53	Jim Owens	SF	United States	San Diego Conquistadors	Arizona State (Sr.)
6	54	Neal Jurgensen^{#}	F	United States	New York Nets	Oregon State (Sr.)
6	55	Aron Stewart^{#}	G	United States	Virginia Squires	Richmond (Sr.)
6	56	Martinez Denmon^{#}	G	United States	Denver Rockets	Iowa State (Sr.)
6	57	Joe Wallace^{#}	SF	United States	Indiana Pacers	Denver (Sr.)
6	58	Dave Winfield^{#}	F	United States	Utah Stars	Minnesota (Sr.)
6	59	Mike Boylan^{#}	F	United States	Kentucky Colonels	Assumption College (Sr.)
6	60	Joe Reaves	SF	United States	Carolina Cougars	Bethel College (Tennessee) (Sr.)
7	61	E. C. Coleman	PF	United States	Memphis Tams	Houston Baptist (Sr.)
7	62	Rich Fuqua^{#}	SG	United States	San Antonio Gunslingers/Spurs	Oral Roberts (Sr.)
7	63	Ken Charles	SG	Trinidad and Tobago	San Diego Conquistadors	Fordham (Sr.)
7	64	Nate Stephens^{#}	C	United States	New York Nets	Long Beach State (Sr.)
7	65	Ruben Montanez^{#}	G	Puerto Rico	Virginia Squires	Duquesne (Sr.)
7	66	James Brown^{#}	F	United States	Denver Rockets	Harvard (Sr.)
7	67	Jim Andrews^{#}	C	United States	Indiana Pacers	Kentucky (Sr.)
7	68	B. G. Brosterhous^{#}	F	United States	Utah Stars	Texas (Sr.)
7	69	Les Taylor^{#}	SF	United States	Kentucky Colonels	Murray State (Sr.)
7	70	Ozie Edwards^{#}	G	United States	Carolina Cougars	Oklahoma City (Sr.)
8	71	Rod Freeman	SF	United States	Memphis Tams	Vanderbilt (Sr.)
8	72	Henry Wilmore^{#}	SG/SF	United States	San Antonio Gunslingers/Spurs	Michigan (Sr.)
8	73	Chris McMurray^{#}	F	United States	San Diego Conquistadors	San Diego State (Sr.)
8	74	Gene Doyle^{#}	F	United States	New York Nets	Holy Cross (Sr.)
8	75	Walt McGrary^{#}	F	United States	Virginia Squires	Chattanooga (Sr.)
8	76	Gary Rhoades^{#}	G	United States	Denver Rockets	Colorado State (Sr.)
8	77	Mike Edwards^{#}	SG	United States	Indiana Pacers	Tennessee (Sr.)
8	78	Mike Williams^{#}	G	United States	Utah Stars	Kentucky Wesleyan (Sr.)
8	79	James Greene^{#}	F	United States	Kentucky Colonels	Kentucky Wesleyan (Sr.)
8	80	Steve Becker^{#}	G	United States	Carolina Cougars	Yankton (Sr.)
9	81	Charles Mitchell^{#}	F	United States	Memphis Tams	Eastern Kentucky (Sr.)
9	82	Mark Sibley	PG	United States	San Antonio Gunslingers/Spurs	Northwestern (Sr.)
9	83	Russ Hunt^{#}	C	United States	San Diego Conquistadors	Furman (Sr.)
9	84	Clinton Harris^{#}	F	United States	New York Nets	Iowa State (Sr.)
9	85	Phil Chenier	SG	United States	Virginia Squires	California (Sr.)
9	86	Connie Warren^{#}	F	United States	Denver Rockets	Xavier (Sr.)
9	87	Bobby Wilson^{#}	G	United States	Indiana Pacers	Wichita State (Sr.)
9	88	Roy McPipe	SG	United States	Utah Stars	Eastern Montana (Sr.)
9	89	John Johnson^{#}	F	United States	Kentucky Colonels	Denver (Sr.)
9	90	Abe Steward^{#}	F	United States	Carolina Cougars	Jacksonville (Sr.)
10	91	Chuck Iverson^{#}	F	United States	Memphis Tams	South Dakota (Sr.)
10	92	Lawrence Lilly^{#}	C	United States	San Antonio Gunslingers/Spurs	Alabama State (Sr.)
10	93	Nick Connor^{#}	F	United States	San Diego Conquistadors	Illinois (Sr.)
10	94	Gene Armstead^{#}	C/PF	United States	New York Nets	Rutgers (Sr.)
10	95	Joe Caffeyky^{#}	G	United States	Virginia Squires	NC State (Sr.)
10	96	Jeff Dawson^{#}	G	United States	Denver Rockets	Illinois (Sr.)
10	97	Byron Jones^{#}	F	United States	Indiana Pacers	San Francisco (Sr.)
10	98	Melvin Russell^{#}	PG	United States	Utah Stars	Centenary (Sr.)
10	99	Mike Macaluso	SG	United States	Kentucky Colonels	Canisius (Sr.)
10	100	Gerald Smith^{#}	C	United States	Carolina Cougars	Detroit (Sr.)

=== 1973 ABA undergraduate draft ===
The ABA undergraduate draft would be considered a continuation of the official ABA draft (known for this year as the ABA senior draft properly), with ABA teams selecting undergraduate prospects from various colleges and universities early on that weren't previously selected in the prior "special circumstances draft" in the hopes that they would play for them in the ABA, similar to what they had done with some prospects in the past or with what's currently going on in the present day with some players in more modern NBA drafts. As such, this draft's round and pick orders will be listed with the official round and pick numbers as it normally would be, followed by what the ABA considered the official round and pick numbers in parentheses due to the loose structure at hand for this year's ABA draft and only this year's ABA draft.

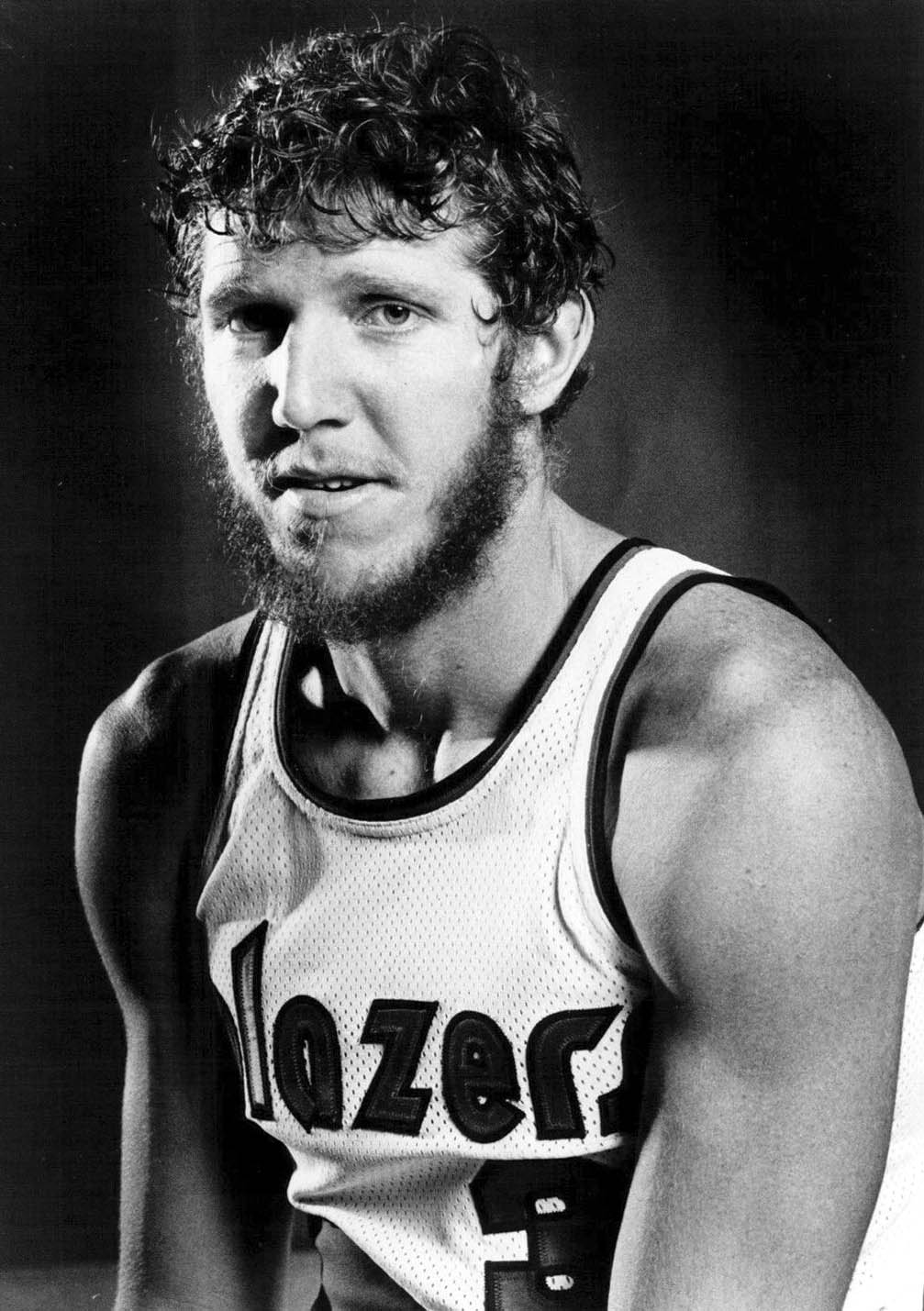
Bill Walton was the first pick of the 1973 ABA undergraduate draft (101st overall draft pick) by the San Diego Conquistadors.

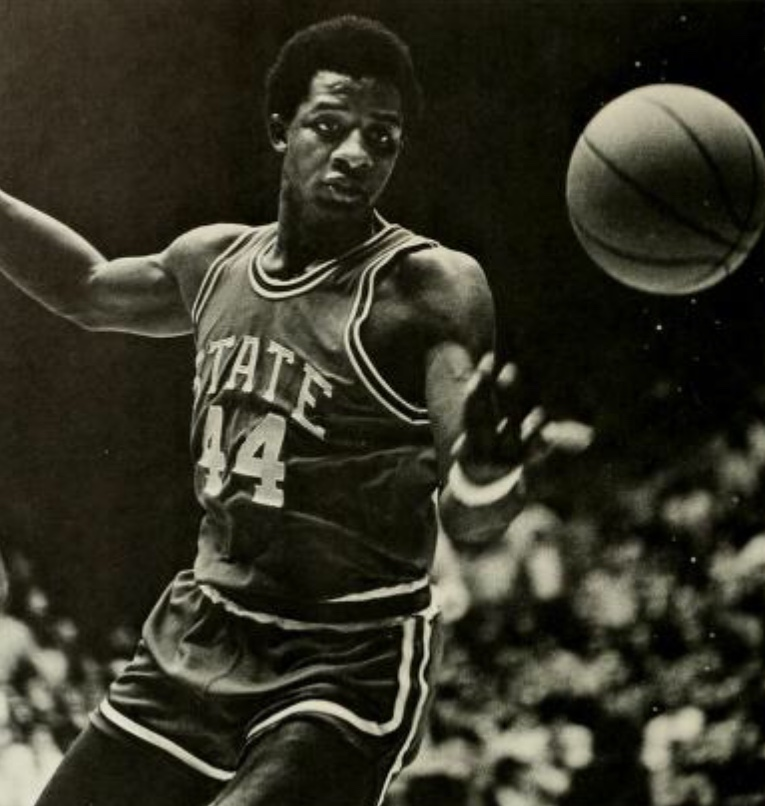
David Thompson was the second pick in the 1973 ABA undergraduate draft (102nd overall draft pick) by the Memphis Tams.

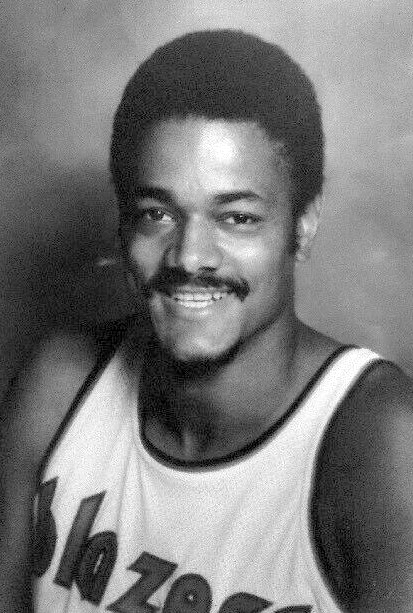
Maurice Lucas was the tenth pick in the 1973 ABA undergraduate draft (110th overall draft pick) by the Carolina Cougars.

Round	Pick	Player	Pos.	Nationality	Team	School
11 (1)	101 (1)	Bill Walton^	C	United States	San Diego Conquistadors	UCLA (Jr.)
11 (1)	102 (2)	David Thompson^‡	SG	United States	Memphis Tams	NC State (So.)
11 (1)	103 (3)	Dwight Jones	PF/C	United States	San Antonio Gunslingers/Spurs	Houston (Jr.)
11 (1)	104 (4)	Henry Williams^{#}	F	United States	New York Nets	Jacksonville (So.)
11 (1)	105 (5)	Phil Smith	SG	United States	Virginia Squires	San Francisco (Jr.)
11 (1)	106 (6)	Marvin Barnes~^{+}‡	PF/C	United States	Denver Rockets	Providence (Jr.)
11 (1)	107 (7)	Len Elmore	C/PF	United States	Indiana Pacers	Maryland (Jr.)
11 (1)	108 (8)	Bruce Seals	PF/SF	United States	Utah Stars	Xavier (Louisiana) (Jr.)
11 (1)	109 (9)	Don Smith	PG	United States	Kentucky Colonels	Dayton (Jr.)
11 (1)	110 (10)	Maurice Lucas^{+}‡	PF	United States	Carolina Cougars	Marquette (Jr.)
12 (2)	111 (11)	Larry Robinson^{#}	F	United States	Memphis Tams	Texas (Jr.)
12 (2)	112 (12)	Tom Henderson	PG	United States	San Antonio Gunslingers/Spurs	Hawaii (Jr.)
12 (2)	113 (13)	Jim Bradley	F	United States	San Diego Conquistadors	Northern Illinois (Jr.)
12 (2)	114 (14)	Campy Russell	SF	United States	New York Nets	Michigan (Jr.)
12 (2)	115 (15)	John Shumate	PF/C	United States	Virginia Squires	Notre Dame (Jr.)
12 (2)	116 (16)	Dennis DuVal	G	United States	Denver Rockets	Syracuse (Jr.)
12 (2)	117 (17)	Rudy Jackson^{#}	C	United States	Indiana Pacers	Hutchinson Community Junior College (Fr.)
12 (2)	118 (18)	Marvin Webster	C	United States	Utah Stars	Morgan State (So.)
12 (2)	119 (19)	Jim Forbes^{#}	F	United States	Kentucky Colonels	UTEP (Jr.)
12 (2)	120 (20)	Kevin Restani	PF/C	United States	Carolina Cougars	San Francisco (Jr.)

=== 1973 ABA supplemental draft ===
Interestingly, the only two teams to decline participation in entering the supplemental draft for the ABA this year entirely were the Indiana Pacers and New York Nets. All the other teams involved in this draft would use multiple selections within multiple rounds in order to take whoever was available within this particular draft. Unlike the other drafts at hand for the ABA, however, this particular draft would see scant few successes, with most of these players never even playing professionally altogether, while the few that did mostly had success playing professionally in the rivaling NBA instead. The best successes in terms of players that were drafted there were Slick Watts, Wayne Pack, Billy Harris (the only two players to actually go and play in the ABA from this specific draft), and Harvey Catchings, the very last pick of this entire ABA draft period.

Round	Pick	Player	Pos.	Nationality	Team	School
1	1	Larry Moore^{#}	C	United States	San Diego Conquistadors	UT-Arlington (Sr.)
1	2	Wardell Jeffries^{#}	G	United States	Memphis Tams	Oklahoma Baptist (Sr.)
1	3	Craig Littlepage^{#}	C	United States	San Antonio Gunslingers/Spurs	Pennsylvania (Sr.)
1	4	Lamont King^{#}	G	United States	Denver Rockets	Long Beach State (Sr.)
1	5	Dennis Johnson^{#}	G	United States	Utah Stars	Ferris State (Sr.)
1	6	Steve Rowell^{#}	G	United States	Kentucky Colonels	Rhode Island (Sr.)
1	7	Willie Calvert^{#}	C	United States	Virginia Squires	Abilene Christian (Sr.)
1	8	Cal Tatum^{#}	PG	United States	Carolina Cougars	Southern Colorado State (Sr.)
2	9	Slick Watts	PG	United States	Memphis Tams	Xavier (Louisiana) (Sr.)
2	10	John Coughran	F	United States	San Antonio Gunslingers/Spurs	California (Sr.)
2	11	Mike Contreras^{#}	G	United States	San Diego Conquistadors	Arizona State (Sr.)
2	12	Tom Peck^{#}	F	United States	Denver Rockets	Wisconsin–Eau Claire (Sr.)
2	13	Bill McCoy^{#}	G	United States	Utah Stars	Northern Iowa (Sr.)
2	14	James Garvin	PF	United States	Kentucky Colonels	Boston University (Sr.)
2	15	Don Johnson^{#}	F	United States	Virginia Squires	Lebanon Valley College (Sr.)
2	16	Steve Smith^{#}	F	United States	Carolina Cougars	Loyola Los Angeles (Sr.)
3	17	Roy Simpson^{#}	F	United States	Memphis Tams	Furman (Sr.)
3	18	Bob Fullarton^{#}	C	United States	San Antonio Gunslingers/Spurs	Xavier (Sr.)
3	19	Doug Little^{#}	G	United States	San Diego Conquistadors	Oregon (Sr.)
3	20	Lindell Reason^{#}	G	United States	Denver Rockets	Eastern Michigan (Sr.)
3	21	James Floyd^{#}	F	United States	Utah Stars	Shaw University (Sr.)
3	22	Chuck Witt^{#}	F	United States	Kentucky Colonels	Western Kentucky (Sr.)
3	23	Greg Hawkins^{#}	F	United States	Virginia Squires	North Carolina State (Jr.)
3	24	Bill Bailey^{#}	F	United States	Carolina Cougars	Catawba College (Sr.)
4	25	Norman Russell^{#}	C	United States	Memphis Tams	Oklahoma City (Sr.)
4	26	Bill Kilgore^{#}	C	United States	San Antonio Gunslingers/Spurs	Michigan State (Sr.)
4	27	Ernie Kusnyer^{#}	F	United States	San Diego Conquistadors	Kansas State (Sr.)
4	28	Charles Golson^{#}	C	United States	Utah Stars	College of Emporia (Sr.)
4	29	Fran Costello^{#}	F	United States	Kentucky Colonels	Providence (Sr.)
4	30	Mike Allocco^{#}	F	United States	Virginia Squires	Stonehill College (Sr.)
4	31	Dave Angel^{#}	C	United States	Carolina Cougars	Clemson (Sr.)
5	32	Aaron Covington^{#}	G	United States	Memphis Tams	Canisius (Sr.)
5	33	Ronnie Hogue^{#}	G	United States	San Antonio Gunslingers/Spurs	Georgia (Sr.)
5	34	Mike Quick^{#}	G	United States	Utah Stars	San Francisco (Sr.)
5	35	Eddie Childress^{#}	F	United States	Kentucky Colonels	Austin Peay (Sr.)
5	36	Alan Shaw^{#}	C	United States	Virginia Squires	Duke (Sr.)
5	37	Carl Jackson^{#}	F	United States	Carolina Cougars	St. Bonaventure (Sr.)
6	38	Fred Lavaroni^{#}	F	United States	Memphis Tams	Santa Clara (Sr.)
6	39	John Laing^{#}	C	United States	San Antonio Gunslingers/Spurs	Augustana College (Illinois) (Sr.)
6	40	Jerry Bisbano^{#}	F	United States	San Diego Conquistadors	Southwestern Louisiana (Sr.)
6	41	Lee Colburn^{#}	F	United States	Utah Stars	South Dakota State (Sr.)
6	42	Jerry Clark^{#}	G	United States	Kentucky Colonels	Skagit Valley College (So.)
6	43	Howard White^{#}	G	United States	Virginia Squires	Maryland (Sr.)
6	44	Lynn Greer^{#}	C	United States	Carolina Cougars	Virginia State (Sr.)
7	45	John Wolfenberg^{#}	F	United States	Memphis Tams	Valparaiso (Sr.)
7	46	Jeff Overhouse^{#}	F	United States	San Antonio Gunslingers/Spurs	Texas A&M (Sr.)
7	47	Mark Beckwith^{#}	C	United States	San Diego Conquistadors	Montana State (Sr.)
7	48	Robert White^{#}	F	United States	Utah Stars	Sam Houston State (Sr.)
7	49	Darrell Brown^{#}	F	United States	Virginia Squires	Maryland (Sr.)
7	50	Dale Adams^{#}	F	United States	Carolina Cougars	St. Mary's College of Maryland (Sr.)
8	51	Jim Crawford^{#}	F	United States	Memphis Tams	La Salle (Sr.)
8	52	Tim Dominey^{#}	G	United States	San Antonio Gunslingers/Spurs	Valdosta State (Sr.)
8	53	Wayne Pack	PG	United States	San Diego Conquistadors	Tennessee Tech (Sr.)
8	54	Gary Watson^{#}	F	United States	Utah Stars	Wisconsin (Sr.)
8	55	Linwood Johnson^{#}	PF/C	United States	Virginia Squires	Virginia State (Sr.)
8	56	Terrence Murchison^{#}	F	United States	Carolina Cougars	Fayetteville State (Sr.)
9	57	Rick Williams^{#}	G	United States	Memphis Tams	Iowa (Sr.)
9	58	Billy Harris	G	United States	San Antonio Gunslingers/Spurs	Northern Illinois (Sr.)
9	59	Fred DeVaughn^{#}	F	United States	San Diego Conquistadors	Westmont College (Sr.)
9	60	Larry Davis^{#}	F	United States	Utah Stars	Centenary College (Sr.)
10	61	Joe Wise^{#}	G	United States	Memphis Tams	Bridgewater State (Sr.)
10	62	Bob Bodell^{#}	G	United States	San Antonio Gunslingers/Spurs	Maryland (Sr.)
10	63	Ben Kelso^{#}	G	United States	Utah Stars	Central Michigan (Sr.)
11	64	Reed Johnson^{#}	G	United States	Memphis Tams	Oklahoma Christian College (So.)
11	65	Leon Howard^{#}	F	United States	San Antonio Gunslingers/Spurs	Wisconsin (Sr.)
11	66	Nate Hawthorne^{#}	F	United States	Utah Stars	Southern Illinois (Sr.)
12	67	Greg Jurcisin^{#}	C	United States	Memphis Tams	Connecticut (Sr.)
12	68	Mark Jellison^{#}	G	United States	San Antonio Gunslingers/Spurs	Northeastern (Sr.)
12	69	John Thomas^{#}	F	United States	Utah Stars	Joplin Junior College (Sr.)
13	70	Gary Black^{#}	G	United States	Utah Stars	Rocky Mountain College (Sr.)
14	71	Sam Whitehead^{#}	F	United States	Utah Stars	Oregon State (Sr.)
15	72	Harvey Catchings	PF/C	United States	Utah Stars	Hardin–Simmons (Jr.)

=== Notable undrafted players ===
These players were officially considered draft eligible for the 1973 ABA draft and went undrafted in all four of the league's special circumstances, senior, undergraduate, and supplementary drafts throughout this year, yet still played at least one regular season or playoff game for the ABA before the ABA-NBA merger commenced three years later.

Player	Pos.	Nationality	School
Roy Ebron	C	United States	Southwestern Louisiana (Jr.)
Billy James	PG	United States	Marshall (Sr.)
John Williamson	SG	United States	New Mexico State (Jr.)
