= 1973–74 San Antonio Spurs season =

ABA basketball team season

- Head coach: Tom Nissalke
- General manager: Jack Ankerson
- Owner(s): Angelo Drossos; John Schaefer; Red McCombs
- Arena: HemisFair Arena

Results
- Record: 45–39 (.536)
- Place: Division: 3rd (Western); Conference: 3rd
- Playoff finish: West Division semifinals (lost to Pacers 3–4)
- Stats at Basketball Reference

Local media
- Television: WOAI-TV
- Radio: KKYX

The 1973–74 San Antonio Spurs season was the first season for the newly named San Antonio Spurs, who had spent the past six seasons as the Dallas Chaparrals (and in one season's case, the Texas Chaparrals) in the American Basketball Association. The team initially went by the San Antonio Gunslingers before the season began, but decided to change their name to the Spurs some time before the season officially began either by results of a "Name That Team" contest or by the recommendation of one of the team's new co-owners as a nod to the birth town of Spur, Texas. In any case, the Spurs made their debut on October 10, 1973, against the San Diego Conquistadors in San Antonio, losing 121–106. Afterwards, the Spurs would win just 6 of their next 13 games, with one of their first wins also resulting in the lowest number of points scored by one team in ABA history with 66 total points scored by the three-time ABA champion Indiana Pacers in a 92–66 win for the Spurs. By the end of November, they would be back to .500. During this season, the Spurs owners would be able to buyout the previous Dallas Chaparrals owners and permanently own the team after previously being under a lease agreement with them back when they first owned the relocated franchise, which helped secure greater success with a newfound fanbase there. Also during the season, the Spurs would improve their standings with the city of San Antonio even more not just with them promoting both Coca-Cola and Pepsi products in their stadium when most arena venues would usually have one or the other involved, but also by acquiring stars Swen Nater (who would later win the ABA's Rookie of the Year Award this season despite not being drafted in the 1973 ABA draft period and instead previously being drafted in the 1972 ABA draft and later having his draft rights acquired by the Virginia Squires from "The Floridians", but staying in UCLA for his senior year) and George Gervin from the Squires in exchange for cash considerations that would help the Squires survive in the short-term. By February the Spurs were at 34–33, but they would win 11 of their next 16 games to finish the season 3rd in the five team Western Conference, going to the playoffs. In the 1974 ABA Playoffs, the Spurs lost in the first round 4–3 to the Indiana Pacers.

== ABA Draft ==
Interestingly, this year's ABA draft would involve four different types of drafts throughout the early 1973 year: a "Special Circumstances Draft" on January 15, a "Senior Draft" on April 25, a "Undergraduate Draft" also on April 25, and a "Supplemental Draft" on May 18. However, unlike every other ABA team at hand, this team would actually do the "Special Circumstances Draft" while using their old Dallas Chaparrals name since they were still called that back on January 15, 1973, while with every other draft after that, the team would make these selections either under the initially planned San Antonio Gunslingers name or the eventual San Antonio Spurs name they would use by the end of the season, if not the initially planned San Antonio Gunslingers name for the rest of these drafts before later becoming the San Antonio Spurs after the draft periods ended. Regardless of the timeline of San Antonio's selections, the new San Antonio franchise would have all of the Chaparrals' past history and draft picks, including those of the "Special Circumstances Draft" back in January 1973. As such, the following Dallas Chaparrals/San Antonio Gunslingers(/Spurs) draft picks were retroactively made by the Spurs properly this year.

=== ABA Special Circumstances Draft ===
| Round | Pick | Player | Position | Nationality | College |
|---|---|---|---|---|---|
| 1 | 6 | Kevin Kunnert | C | United States | Iowa |
| 2 | 17 | John Brown | SF | United States; West Germany | St. John's |

The selections of center Kevin Kunnert and small forward John Brown can be considered the last two official selections ever made by the Dallas Chaparrals franchise since those two particular picks were made back when the franchise was still going by the Dallas Chaparrals name at the time. Going from this point onward, all other selections made throughout the later drafts done this year will officially be considered San Antonio Spurs draft picks (even if they were all initially considered San Antonio Gunslingers draft picks at the time of these respective drafts first starting), with the selections of Kunnert and Brown being transferred from the Dallas Chaparrals to the new San Antonio franchise following the conclusion of the previous season, starting with their purchase from San Antonio's Professional Sports, Inc. group with the unique loan-lease plan they first had, which gave the Chaparrals the right to revive their franchise back in Dallas had the Spurs not figured things out as well as they did in their first year of ownership in the ABA.

=== ABA Senior Draft ===
| Round | Pick | Player | Position(s) | Nationality | College |
|---|---|---|---|---|---|
| 1 | 3 | Mike D'Antoni | PG | United States; Italy | Marshall |
| 2 | 12 | Kevin Joyce | PG/SG | United States | South Carolina |
| 3 | 22 | Tom Kozelko | PF | United States | Toledo |
| 5 | 42 | Luke Witte | C | United States | Ohio State |
| 6 | 52 | Gary Melchionni | PG | United States | Duke |
| 7 | 62 | Rich Fuqua | SG | United States | Oral Roberts |
| 8 | 72 | Henry Wilmore | SG/SF | United States | Michigan |
| 9 | 82 | Mark Sibley | PG | United States | Northwestern |
| 10 | 92 | Lawrence Lilly | C | United States | Alabama State |

The "Senior Draft" done in April is often considered the official, main draft period of the 1973 ABA draft by basketball historians. Also, when speaking retroactively with the Spurs, even though these selections made starting with the "Senior Draft" onward may have been made under the San Antonio Gunslingers name, all of these selections are still considered picks made by the San Antonio Spurs properly, if only retroactively speaking. Notably, the team's first ever draft pick while being located in San Antonio properly, Italian-American point guard Mike D'Antoni, would end up being named one of the 50 Greatest EuroLeague Contributors in 2008 and was named a member of the Naismith Basketball Hall of Fame (as a contributor) in 2026 after leaving the Spurs once they entered the NBA by helping the Italian team he ended up playing for, the Pallacanestro Olimpia Milano, to many different Italian and European championships throughout the rest of his European playing career before retiring from play by 1990 in order to start his coaching career with them.

=== ABA Undergraduate Draft ===
| Round | Pick | Player | Position(s) | Nationality | College |
|---|---|---|---|---|---|
| 11 (1) | 103 (3) | Dwight Jones | PF/C | United States | Houston |
| 12 (2) | 112 (12) | Tom Henderson | PG | United States | Hawaii |

The "Undergraduate Draft" is considered a continuation of the "Senior Draft" that was done earlier that same day, hence the numbering of the rounds and draft picks here.

=== ABA Supplemental Draft ===
| Round | Pick | Player | Position(s) | Nationality | College |
|---|---|---|---|---|---|
| 1 | 3 | Craig Littlepage | C | United States | Pennsylvania |
| 2 | 10 | John Coughran | SF/PF | United States | California |
| 3 | 18 | Bob Fullarton | C | United States | Xavier University (Ohio) |
| 4 | 26 | Bill Kilgore | C | United States | Michigan State |
| 5 | 33 | Ronnie Hogue | G | United States | Georgia |
| 6 | 39 | John Laing | C | United States | Augustana College (Illinois) |
| 7 | 46 | Jeff Overhouse | F | United States | Texas A&M |
| 8 | 52 | Tim Dominey | G | United States | Valdosta State |
| 9 | 58 | Billy Harris | SG | United States | Northern Illinois |
| 10 | 62 | Bob Bodell | G | United States | Maryland |
| 11 | 65 | Leon Howard | F | United States | Wisconsin |
| 12 | 68 | Mark Jellison | G | United States | Northeastern |

None of the twelve players selected in the "Supplemental Draft" would ever play for the Spurs once the team officially changed their team name from the Gunslingers to the Spurs following this draft's conclusion in May, though the San Antonio franchise would see the most number of players gain successful play either in the ABA or NBA not long afterward. While their first pick in that draft, Craig Littlepage, would be like every other first round pick in this particular draft and not play professionally either in the ABA or NBA, Littlepage would see himself be a head coach for college basketball teams for the University of Pennsylvania and Rutgers University before becoming an athletic director for the University of Virginia. Then, with their second pick in that draft, John Coughran, he would eventually play for a season in the NBA with the Golden State Warriors long after the NBA-ABA merger came and went after previously playing for a YMCA team and some overseas professional basketball teams before that point. Finally, after many different duds, the last player selected to see some sort of success as a professional basketball player, ninth round pick Billy Harris, would end up playing one season for the San Diego Conquistadors after not playing for either the Spurs or the Chicago Bulls during his draft year.

== Roster ==
1973–74 San Antonio Spurs roster
Players

| Pos. | No. | Player | Height | Weight | DOB | From |
|---|---|---|---|---|---|---|
| SG | 10 | Bird Averitt | 6 ft 1 in (1.85 m) | 170 lb (77 kg) | July 22, 1952 | Pepperdine |
| C | 42 | Roger Brown | 6 ft 11 in (2.11 m) | 225 lb (102 kg) | February 23, 1950 | Kansas |
| SF | 40 | Jerry Chambers | 6 ft 5 in (1.96 m) | 185 lb (84 kg) | July 18, 1943 | Utah |
| PF | 25 | Coby Dietrick | 6 ft 10 in (2.08 m) | 220 lb (100 kg) | July 23, 1948 | San José State |
| SF | 44 | George Gervin | 6 ft 7 in (2.01 m) | 180 lb (82 kg) | April 27, 1952 | Eastern Michigan |
| PG | 11 | Joe Hamilton | 5 ft 10 in (1.78 m) | 160 lb (73 kg) | July 5, 1948 | North Texas State |
| SF | 54 | Simmie Hill | 6 ft 7 in (2.01 m) | 233 lb (106 kg) | November 14, 1946 | West Texas A&M |
| PF | 33 | Rich Jones | 6 ft 6 in (1.98 m) | 220 lb (100 kg) | December 27, 1946 | Memphis |
| PG | 22 | George Karl | 6 ft 2 in (1.88 m) | 190 lb (86 kg) | May 12, 1951 | North Carolina |
| SF | 50 | Goo Kennedy | 6 ft 5 in (1.96 m) | 205 lb (93 kg) | August 23, 1949 | TCU |
| C | 31 | Swen Nater | 6 ft 11 in (2.11 m) | 240 lb (109 kg) | January 14, 1950 | UCLA |
| PF | 24 | Bob Netolicky | 6 ft 9 in (2.06 m) | 220 lb (100 kg) | August 2, 1942 | Drake |
| PG | 13 | James Silas | 6 ft 1 in (1.85 m) | 180 lb (82 kg) | February 11, 1949 | Stephen F. Austin |
| SG | 21 | Skeeter Swift | 6 ft 3 in (1.91 m) | 204 lb (93 kg) | June 19, 1946 | East Tennessee State |
| SF | 30 | Chuck Terry | 6 ft 6 in (1.98 m) | 215 lb (98 kg) | September 27, 1950 | Long Beach State |
| SG | 21 | Bob Warren | 6 ft 5 in (1.96 m) | 190 lb (86 kg) | July 17, 1946 | Vanderbilt |

Coaches
Head coach
- Tom Nissalke

Legend
- (DP) Unsigned draft pick
- (FA) Free agent
- (S) Suspended
- Injured

== Regular season ==
=== ABA Schedule ===
| Game | Date | Opponent | Result | Spurs | Opponents | Record |
| 1 | | | | | | |
| 2 | | | | | | |

=== Season standings ===
1973–74 ABA Western Standings
| Western Division | W | L | PCT. | GB |
|---|---|---|---|---|
| Utah Stars | 51 | 33 | .607 | – |
| Indiana Pacers | 46 | 38 | .548 | 5 |
| San Antonio Spurs | 45 | 39 | .536 | 6 |
| San Diego Conquistadors | 37 | 47 | .440 | 14 |
| Denver Rockets | 37 | 47 | .440 | 14 |

== ABA Playoffs ==
ABA Western Division Semifinals

| Game | Date | Location | Score | Record | Attendance |
| 1 | March 30 | Indiana | 113–109 | 1–0 | 7,438 |
| 2 | April 1 | Indiana | 101–128 | 1–1 | 6,988 |
| 3 | April 3 | San Antonio | 115–96 | 2–1 | 10,693 |
| 4 | April 4 | San Antonio | 89–91 | 2–2 | 12,079 |
| 5 | April 6 | Indiana | 100–105 | 2–3 | 10,079 |
| 6 | April 10 | San Antonio | 102–86 | 3–3 | 12,304 |
| 7 | April 12 | Indiana | 79–86 | 3–4 | 10,079 |

Spurs lose series, 4–3
