= 1975–76 San Antonio Spurs season =

ABA basketball team season

- Head coach: Bob Bass
- General manager: John Begzos
- Owners: Angelo Drossos; John Schaefer; Red McCombs
- Arena: HemisFair Arena

Results
- Record: 50–34 (.595)
- Place: Division: 2nd (Western); Conference: 3rd
- Playoff finish: ABA Semifinals (lost to Nets 3–4)
- Stats at Basketball Reference

Local media
- Television: KMOL 4
- Radio: WOAI

The 1975–76 San Antonio Spurs season was the third season for the franchise while in San Antonio, their ninth overall season when including the seasons they played as the Dallas Chaparrals in Dallas and the one season they went as the Texas Chaparrals representing the entire state of Texas as a regional franchise (specifically playing in both Lubbock and Fort Worth alongside Dallas), and their final season they played as a franchise while out in the ABA. Despite being one of three teams to lose to the short-lived San Diego Sails rebranded franchise alongside the Utah Stars and Virginia Squires (both of whom would later fold operations themselves during this season), the Spurs would make it into the 1976 ABA Playoffs as the third-best team in the entire league behind only the New York Nets and Denver Nuggets, though the Spurs would lose 4–3 to the eventual champion New York Nets (led by the future-named ABA All-Time MVP Julius Erving) in the ABA Semifinals. Despite never winning a playoff series out in San Antonio as the Spurs and only winning one total playoff series in their entire history while in the ABA (that being during their inaugural season against the Houston Mavericks as the Dallas Chaparrals), the Spurs would be admitted to the National Basketball Association (NBA) along with what were considered the other three strongest teams in the ABA in the Denver Nuggets, the Indiana Pacers, and the most recent (and final) ABA champion New York Nets (now Brooklyn Nets) following the conclusion of the ABA-NBA merger talks in June 1976 due to the Spurs quickly being the highest-growing attending team in the ABA despite only having three seasons spent in San Antonio and having the second-smallest venue of the ABA teams that survived the regular season ahead of only the Virginia Squires' multiple smaller venues, as well as the smallest venue of every ABA team around once the merger occurred. The team's fortunes would only grow for the better in later seasons once they spent more time within the NBA, to the point of having the best success of all previous ABA teams post-merger with five NBA Finals championships to their name (having more championships going forward in the NBA than even the Indiana Pacers during their time in the ABA).

== ABA Draft ==
Round	Pick	Player	Position(s)	Nationality	College
1	8	Mark Olberding	SF/PF	United States	Minnesota
2	21	Rick Suttle	C	United States	Kansas
3	28	Bill Taylor	SF	United States	La Salle College
4	38	Ken Smith	SG	United States	Tulsa
5	48	Robert Parish	C	United States	Centenary College of Louisiana
6	58	Bayard Forrest	C	United States	Grand Canyon
7	68	Henry Ward	SG	United States	Jackson State
8	78	Gary Tomaszewski	SF/PF	United States	St. Mary's University of Texas

The Spurs' 48th pick in the final ABA Draft ever held, Robert Parish, would be the only non-Denver Nuggets associated selection/player from this draft to either be named an All-Star or a Hall of Famer in his career, as while he would never play with the Spurs or join the ABA at all, he would grow a storied career in the 1980s with the Boston Celtics in the NBA as a major rival to the Showtime Los Angeles Lakers before winning one last NBA Finals championship (out of four total) in his final season of play in 1997 with the Chicago Bulls at 43 years old as the third-oldest player in NBA history behind Kevin Willis and Nat Hickey (as of 2025).

== Roster ==
1975–76 San Antonio Spurs roster
Players

Pos.	No.	Player	Height	Weight	DOB	From
SF	30	Allan Bristow	6 ft 7 in (2.01 m)	210 lb (95 kg)	August 23, 1951	Virginia Tech
C	25	Coby Dietrick	6 ft 10 in (2.08 m)	220 lb (100 kg)	July 23, 1948	San José State
PF	23	Will Franklin	6 ft 7 in (2.01 m)	220 lb (100 kg)	October 19, 1949	Purdue
SG	12	Mike Gale	6 ft 4 in (1.93 m)	185 lb (84 kg)	July 18, 1950	Elizabeth City State
SF	44	George Gervin	6 ft 7 in (2.01 m)	180 lb (82 kg)	April 27, 1952	Eastern Michigan
PF	23	Stew Johnson	6 ft 8 in (2.03 m)	220 lb (100 kg)	August 19, 1944	Murray State
PG	22	George Karl	6 ft 2 in (1.88 m)	190 lb (86 kg)	May 12, 1951	North Carolina
PF	35	Larry Kenon	6 ft 9 in (2.06 m)	205 lb (93 kg)	December 13, 1952	Memphis
PF	53	Mark Olberding	6 ft 8 in (2.03 m)	225 lb (102 kg)	April 21, 1956 u	Minnesota
C	42	Tom Owens	6 ft 10 in (2.08 m)	215 lb (98 kg)	June 28, 1949	South Carolina
C	5	Billy Paultz	6 ft 11 in (2.11 m)	235 lb (107 kg)	July 30, 1948	St. John's
PG	13	James Silas	6 ft 1 in (1.85 m)	180 lb (82 kg)	February 11, 1949	Stephen F. Austin
SF	52	Ken Smith	6 ft 7 in (2.01 m)	185 lb (84 kg)	July 12, 1953	Tulsa
PF	30	Dennis Van Zant	6 ft 9 in (2.06 m)	210 lb (95 kg)	June 1, 1952	Azusa Pacific
SG	15	Henry Ward	6 ft 4 in (1.93 m)	195 lb (88 kg)	January 30, 1952	Jackson State
PG	10	Skip Wise	6 ft 2 in (1.88 m)	170 lb (77 kg)	July 25, 1955	Clemson

Coaches
Head coach
- Bob Bass

Legend
- (DP) Unsigned draft pick
- (FA) Free agent
- (S) Suspended
- Injured

== Regular season ==
=== ABA Schedule ===
**Game**	**Date**	**Opponent**	**Result**	**Spurs**	**Opponents**	**Record**
1						
2						

=== Season standings ===
Team	W	L	PCT.	GB
Denver Nuggets *	60	24	.714	—
**New York Nets** *	55	29	.655	5
San Antonio Spurs *	50	34	.595	10
Kentucky Colonels *	46	38	.548	14
Indiana Pacers *	39	45	.464	21
Spirits of St. Louis	35	49	.417	25
Virginia Squires †	15	68	.181	44
San Diego Sails †	3	8	.273	—
Utah Stars †	4	12	.250	—
Baltimore Claws †	0	0	.000	—

Asterisk (*) denotes playoff team
† did not survive the end of the season.
Bold – ABA champions

== ABA Playoffs ==
1976 playoff game log
ABA Semifinals: 3–4 (home: 2–1; road: 1–3)

Game	Date	Team	Score	High points	High rebounds	High assists	Location Attendance	Series
1	April 9	@ New York	L 101–116	George Gervin (30	Billy Paultz / Mike Gale (7)	George Karl (4)	Nassau Veterans Memorial Coliseum; 8,221	0–1
2	April 11	@ New York	W 105–79	Larry Kenon (30)	Billy Paultz (18)	Mike Gale (13)	Nassau Veterans Memorial Coliseum; 5,769	1–1
3	April 14	New York	W 111–103	Larry Kenon (28)	Larry Kenon (16)	Mike Gale (11)	HemisFair Arena; 10,009	2–1
4	April 18	New York	L 108–110	Billy Paultz / George Gervin (28)	Billy Paultz (12)	Billy Paultz (5)	HemisFair Arena; 9,277	2–2
5	April 19	@ New York	L 108–110	Larry Kenon (27)	Larry Kenon (12)	Mike Gale (8)	Nassau Veterans Memorial Coliseum; 11,321	2–3
6	April 21	New York	W 106–105	George Gervin (37)	Larry Kenon (18)	Mike Gale / Billy Paultz (5)	HemisFair Arena; 10,484	3–3
7	April 24	@ New York	L 114–121	George Gervin (31)	Larry Kenon (11)	Mike Gale (6)	Nassau Veterans Memorial Coliseum; 15,934	3–4

1976 schedule

Spurs lose series, 4–3
