= George Karl =

American basketball coach and player (born 1951)

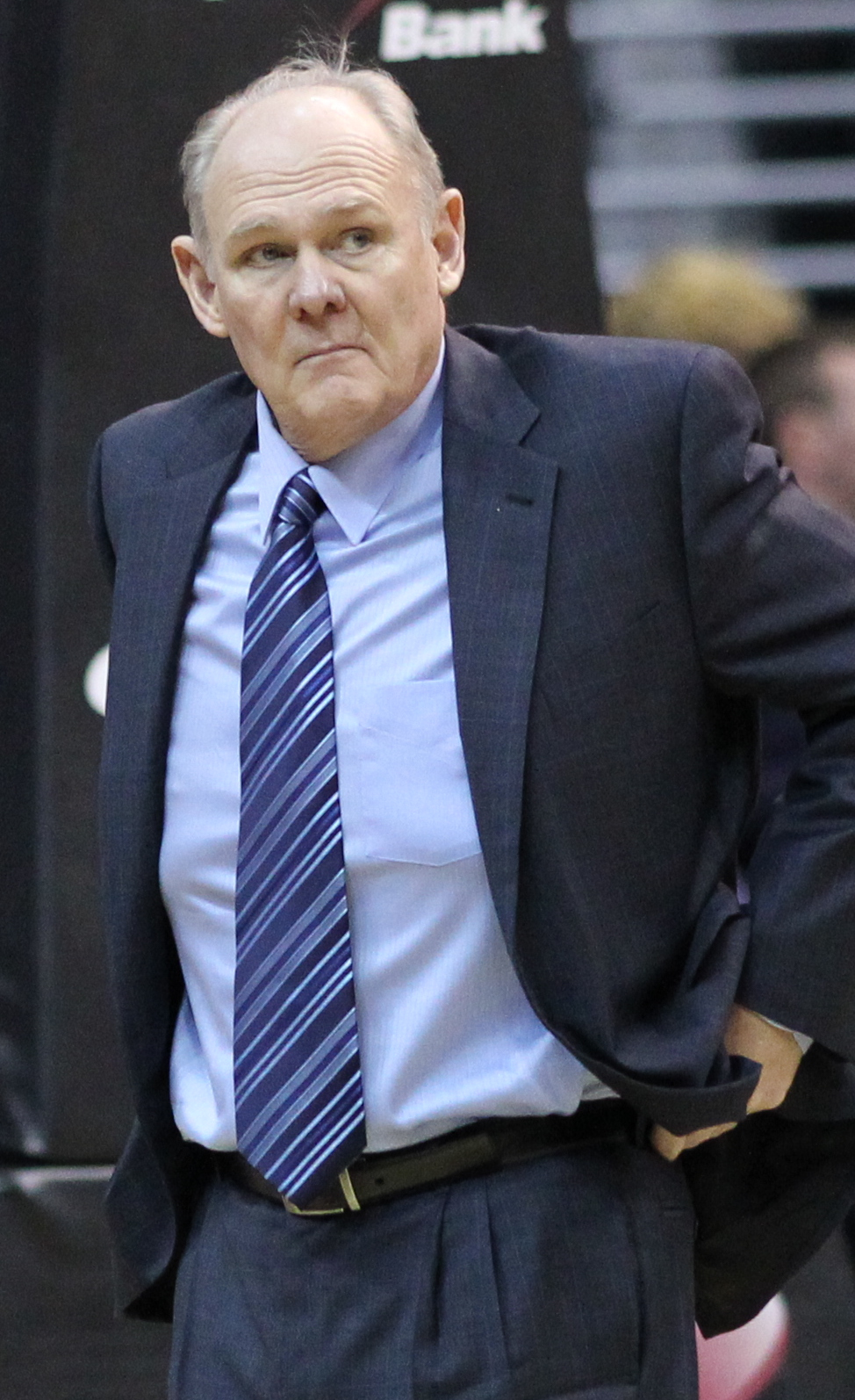
- Karl coaching the Denver Nuggets in 2011

Personal information
- Born: May 12, 1951 (age 75) Penn Hills, Pennsylvania, U.S.
- Listed height: 6 ft 2 in (1.88 m)
- Listed weight: 185 lb (84 kg)

Career information
- High school: Penn Hills (Penn Hills, Pennsylvania)
- College: North Carolina (1970–1973)
- NBA draft: 1973: 4th round, 66th overall pick
- Drafted by: New York Knicks
- Playing career: 1973–1978
- Position: Point guard
- Number: 22
- Coaching career: 1978–2016

Career history

Playing
- 1973–1978: San Antonio Spurs

Coaching
- 1978–1980: San Antonio Spurs (assistant)
- 1980–1983: Montana Golden Nuggets
- 1984–1986: Cleveland Cavaliers
- 1986–1988: Golden State Warriors
- 1988–1989: Albany Patroons
- 1989–1990: Real Madrid
- 1990–1991: Albany Patroons
- 1991–1992: Real Madrid
- 1992–1998: Seattle SuperSonics
- 1998–2003: Milwaukee Bucks
- 2005–2013: Denver Nuggets
- 2015–2016: Sacramento Kings

Career highlights
- As player: First-team All-ACC (1973); 2× Second-team All-ACC (1971, 1972); As coach: NBA Coach of the Year (2013); 4× NBA All-Star Game head coach (1994, 1996, 1998, 2010); 2× CBA Coach of the Year (1981, 1983); FIBA Saporta Cup winner (1992)

Career ABA/NBA playing statistics
- Points: 1,703 (6.5 ppg)
- Rebounds: 369 (1.4 rpg)
- Assists: 795 (3.0 apg)
- Stats at NBA.com
- Stats at Basketball Reference

Career coaching record
- NBA: 1175–824 (.588)
- Record at Basketball Reference
- Basketball Hall of Fame

George Matthew Karl (born May 12, 1951) is an American former professional basketball coach and player. After spending five years as a player for the San Antonio Spurs, he became an assistant with the team before being appointed as a head coach in 1980 with the Montana Golden Nuggets of the Continental Basketball Association (CBA). Three years later, Karl became one of the youngest National Basketball Association (NBA) head coaches in history when he was named coach of the Cleveland Cavaliers at age 33. By the time his coaching career came to an end in 2016, Karl coached nine different teams in three different leagues (CBA, NBA, Liga ACB), which included being named Coach of the Year three combined times (twice in the CBA and once in the NBA) with one championship roster in the FIBA Saporta Cup. He is one of nine coaches in NBA history to have won 1,000 NBA games (which included twelve seasons with fifty or more wins) and was named NBA Coach of the Year for the 2012–13 season. While he never won an NBA championship, Karl made the postseason 22 times with five different teams, which included a trip to the 1996 NBA Finals with the Seattle SuperSonics.

Karl was inducted into the Naismith Memorial Basketball Hall of Fame in 2022.

== Early years ==
Born and raised in Penn Hills, Pennsylvania, a suburb northeast of Pittsburgh, Karl starred at Penn Hills High School and graduated in 1969. He played collegiately at the University of North Carolina for three years on the varsity under head coach Dean Smith. In his senior season in 1973, the Tar Heels finished third in the NIT, with an overall record of 25–8. (The NCAA tournament included just 25 teams in 1973.)

== Playing career ==
While he was selected in the fourth round of the 1973 NBA draft by the New York Knicks and the sixth round of the 1973 ABA senior draft by the Memphis Tams, Karl opted instead to sign with the ABA's San Antonio Spurs. He spent three years as the team's starting point guard, playing with George Gervin. After the Spurs joined the NBA in 1976, Karl played limited minutes over the next two years, and retired as a player in 1978.

== Coaching career ==
=== Early coaching career ===
After his playing career ended, Karl spent two years with the Spurs coaching staff as an assistant coach. He was then named head coach of the Montana Golden Nuggets of the Continental Basketball Association. Karl guided the team to the CBA Finals in 1981 and 1983, winning Coach of the Year both seasons. Despite the success on the court, the franchise folded in 1983.

In 1983, Karl returned to the NBA with the Cleveland Cavaliers as director of player acquisition. Head coach Tom Nissalke was fired after the season in May 1984, and at age 33, Karl was promoted to head coach in late July. In his first season, the Cavaliers made the playoffs for the first time in six seasons. The success did not carry over to the next season, and Karl was dismissed by the Cavaliers in mid-March after a disappointing 25–42 start; Cleveland finished 4–11 under assistant Gene Littles to end up at 29–53 (.354). For the next two months, he was a scout and adviser to the Milwaukee Bucks.

In late May 1986, Karl was named head coach of the Golden State Warriors; he took them from a record of 30–52 the year before, to the playoffs for the first time in ten years. In the first round, they faced the Utah Jazz in a best–of–five series. Each team won two close games at home setting up a decisive fifth game in Utah that the Warriors won to advance to the playoff semifinals.

In 1987 they were matched up in the semifinals against the Los Angeles Lakers, who had won three championships in the past seven seasons, Karl's team was expected to be swept by the much more experienced Lakers, and promptly lost the first three games. Facing elimination in game 4, the Warriors overcame a twelve–point fourth quarter deficit and won 129–121 thanks to Sleepy Floyd's 51-point game. Game 4 was the only game the Lakers lost in the Western Conference playoffs that year, en route to the first of their back–to–back championships.

During the 1987–88 season, the Warriors got off to a rough start, and team management decided to trade Purvis Short, Sleepy Floyd and Joe Barry Carroll in order to save money and get younger. With Chris Mullin going through alcohol rehabilitation, Karl was now without his top four scorers from the 1987 playoff team. Frustrated with the team's direction, he resigned from the Warriors with 18 games left in the season. Though he resigned, there has been speculation Karl was actually fired, as he signed a non-disclosure agreement and received a buyout of his contract.

On September 5, 1988, Karl was named head coach of the Albany Patroons of the CBA, leading them to a 36–18 record. In 1989, Karl coached Real Madrid of Liga ACB. Madrid finished 69–17, though they dealt with the death of their best player, Fernando Martín Espina. Real Madrid came third in the Spanish league, were Spanish cup semifinalists, and lost the final of the Saporta Cup, Europe's second most important cup competition.

Karl returned to coach the Patroons in 1990, leading them to a 50–6 season, while winning all 28 home games. For his efforts, Karl was named CBA Coach of the Year for the third time. Karl then returned to Real Madrid for the 1991–92 season, until he left to return to the NBA. Under Clifford Luyk hired in January 1992, Real Madrid won the Saporta Cup, came second in the Spanish league, and lost in the quarterfinals of the Spanish cup.

==== Seattle SuperSonics ====
On January 23, 1992, Karl was named head coach of the Seattle SuperSonics, replacing K. C. Jones. Karl led a late season surge going 27–15, and entering the playoffs as the sixth seed. In the first round, they upset his former team, the Golden State Warriors in four games, but lost in the second round to the Utah Jazz.

In his second (and first full) season as the SuperSonics coach in 1992–93, the team improved their 47–35 record to 55–27, and qualified for the playoffs as the third seed in the Western Conference. They defeated the Utah Jazz 3–2 in the first round and the Houston Rockets 4–3 in the semifinals. Seattle lost in the Western Conference Finals to the Charles Barkley–led Phoenix Suns in a full seven-game series, falling just one game short of the NBA Finals.

The following season, Seattle won 63 games and its first Pacific Division title since their 1979 championship season. Despite a rift with mid-season acquisition Kendall Gill, Karl led the Sonics to the top seed in the Western Conference. Playing the eighth–seeded Denver Nuggets in the opening round of the playoffs, Seattle won their first two games at home, but lost the following three, including the closing game at home, to become the first top seed to lose to an eighth-seed in the playoffs history.

The 1994–95 season had a similar result when Seattle suffered another first–round playoff loss after finishing the season 57–25. This time, Karl's fourth-seed SuperSonics were defeated by the fifth–seeded Los Angeles Lakers led by point guard Nick Van Exel, who clashed with Karl during the 1993 NBA rookie workouts. Fans and media called for Karl's dismissal after his back-to-back first round losses, but the team instead traded the disgruntled Kendall Gill to Charlotte for Hersey Hawkins, showing a sign of confidence in Karl.

Karl responded to the disappointing playoff exits with the best regular season in SuperSonics history, posting a 14–game winning streak between February and March to finish the 1995–96 season with a franchise-best 64–18 record. Led by All-Stars Shawn Kemp and Gary Payton, the latter named Defensive Player of the Year, the SuperSonics defeated the Sacramento Kings three games to one in the first round, and then swept the two-time reigning champions Houston Rockets to advance to the Western Conference Finals. They defeated the Utah Jazz in seven games to advance to their first NBA Finals since 1979.

In the NBA Finals, the SuperSonics met the 72–10 Chicago Bulls. Seattle was out-matched by Michael Jordan's scoring, Dennis Rodman's rebounding and the Bulls' team defense, and quickly found themselves in a 0–3 deficit and facing a sweep. Karl and the SuperSonics responded with a 21-point game 4 blowout win and a narrow win in game 5, to narrow the series deficit to 3–2. The Bulls won the series and game 6 in Chicago. The 64 wins and Finals appearance marked what was undoubtedly the zenith of Karl's coaching career.

Seattle amassed a 118–46 (.720) record during the next two seasons, winning the Pacific Division title both years. Seattle overcame a 3–1 deficit to force a seventh game against Houston in the second round of the 1997 NBA playoffs, but lost. The following year, Seattle fell swiftly to the Lakers in the Western Conference semifinals. The back-to-back second round playoff exits and his deteriorating relationship with general manager Wally Walker led to Karl's eventual dismissal in late May, two weeks after their elimination.

The SuperSonics went 384–150 (.719) and averaged 59 wins per season under Karl, second only to Chicago during that span. He took Seattle to the playoffs in all seven seasons of his tenure. The SuperSonics won four division championships and twice finished with the best record in the Western Conference. Despite regular season success, Karl's SuperSonics managed only a 40–40 postseason record, and advanced to the NBA Finals just once.

==== Milwaukee Bucks ====
On August 30, 1998, Karl was named head coach of the Milwaukee Bucks, lured by a particularly lucrative contract offer. Coming to a team that had not made the playoffs in seven seasons, Karl helped rebuild the struggling organization by making the playoffs in each of his first three seasons, steadily increasing their win totals.

In his first two seasons they lost in the first round of the playoffs to the Indiana Pacers; after losing in a three-game sweep his first season, the Bucks lost three games to two in his second season. In his third season, Karl guided the Bucks, led by a "Big Three" of Glenn Robinson, Ray Allen and Sam Cassell to their first division championship in 15 years, which culminated with an appearance in the 2001 Eastern Conference Finals, where they lost in seven games to the 76ers.

In Karl's fourth season, the Bucks entered with high expectations; however, they finished in ninth place in the conference and missed the playoffs. Seeded first in the conference at the all-star break, the Bucks collapsed and were eliminated from the playoffs in the final regular season game. Dealing with injuries, Karl was also reportedly at odds with Robinson and Allen.

Following the season, Robinson was traded to Atlanta. At the 2002–03 trade deadline, Allen was traded to Seattle for Gary Payton. Though Payton and Karl had success together in Seattle and the move allowed more minutes for Michael Redd, it made Cassell the odd man out and broke up a core that was within one game of the NBA Finals just two years prior.

The Bucks finished the 2002–03 season 42–40 to qualify for the playoffs, though they were eliminated in the first round in six games. Karl pushed for the team to draft point guard T. J. Ford, making Cassell expendable and he was traded to Minnesota. GM Ernie Grunfeld, who was arguably Karl's biggest supporter in Milwaukee, left the team shortly after the draft; new GM Larry Harris decided to move the team in a new direction and fired Karl in July. In the aftermath of Karl's departure, the Bucks did not win a playoff series until 2019.

During his Bucks tenure, Karl also coached the US national team in the 2002 FIBA World Championship. The team finished sixth in the competition after having been defeated by Argentina in the second preliminary round group stage and later being eliminated by Yugoslavia in the quarterfinals.

==== Denver Nuggets ====
On January 27, 2005, the Denver Nuggets named Karl their head coach, taking over from interim head coach Michael Cooper, who stayed on as an assistant coach. Karl made an immediate impact on the Nuggets, taking a team floundering at 17–25 and 4-16 in the last 20 games before his appointment to a 32–8 record in the second half of the 2004–05 season to finish 49–33. They lost in the playoffs to the San Antonio Spurs, who went on to win the NBA Championship that season.

On July 27, 2005, the Nuggets announced that Karl had prostate cancer, but was cleared to continue coaching after he had surgery. He led the Nuggets to the Northwest division title that season, Denver's first in 18 years.

Karl was criticized for his role in the Knicks–Nuggets brawl on December 16, 2006, allegedly trying to run up the score and humiliate Isiah Thomas by keeping his starting players in the final minutes of a blowout win. On December 28, 2006, Karl became just the 12th coach in NBA history to reach 800 wins when the Nuggets defeated the SuperSonics 112–98. Carmelo Anthony and Allen Iverson were named All-Stars that season, Denver's first All-Star selections since 2001.

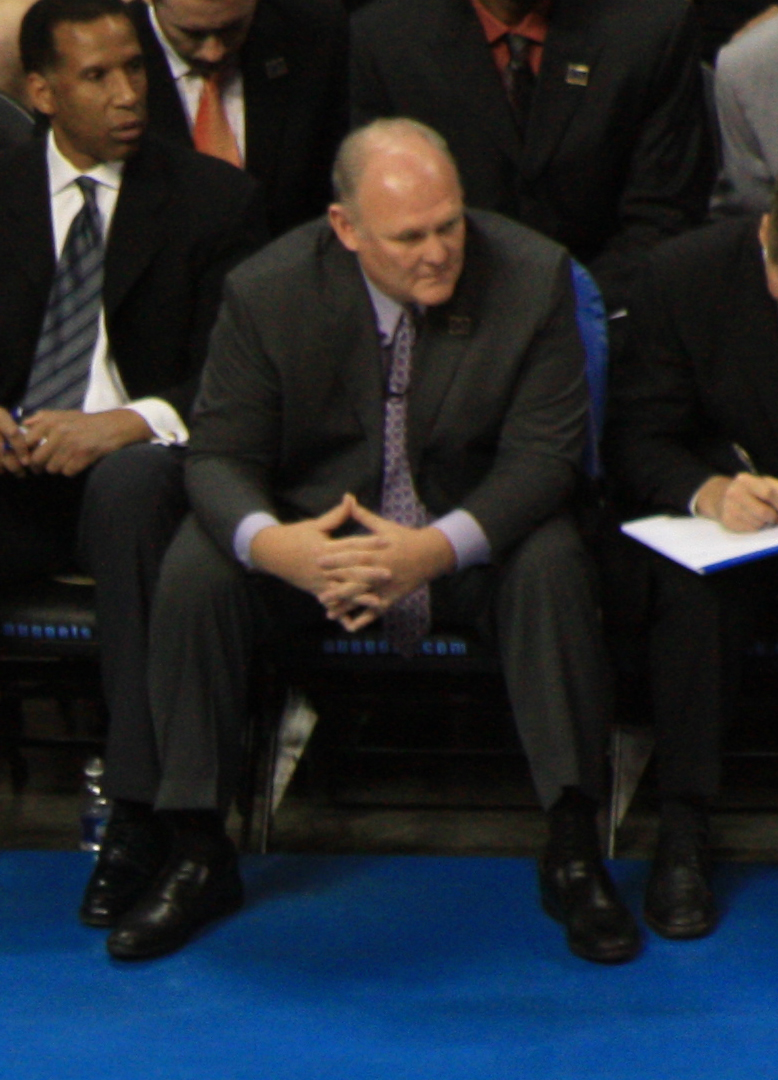
Karl with the Nuggets in 2009

During the 2008–09 season, the Nuggets, led by Karl, Carmelo Anthony, and the newly acquired Chauncey Billups tied a franchise-best 54 wins and entered the playoffs as the Western Conference's #2 seed. On April 27, 2009, the Nuggets handed the Hornets a 58-point loss during Game 4 of their first round playoff series. This tied the biggest margin in NBA playoff history. The Nuggets beat the Mavericks in 5 games during the semifinals, then went on to lose to the eventual champion Los Angeles Lakers in 6 games, losing Game 6 by 27.

Karl coached the Western Conference All–Stars at the 2010 NBA All-Star Game on February 14 at Cowboys Stadium in Arlington, Texas. This was his fourth selection, and his first since leaving Seattle.

After the 2010 NBA All-Star Game, it was revealed in a press conference that Karl was diagnosed with treatable neck and throat cancer. He was placed on leave of absence from the Nuggets for the remainder of the season while receiving treatment. Assistant coach Adrian Dantley filled in as acting head coach, and the team finished poorly, going from the second to fourth seed, and lost their first round playoff series.

Karl went through chemotherapy treatments, and coached every game of the 2010–11 season, becoming the seventh NBA coach to record 1,000 career wins on December 10, 2010. During the season, Carmelo Anthony requested and was granted a trade to New York, and Karl was now coaching a considerably younger and less experienced team.

Without Anthony, Denver's leading scorer for seven years, Karl put an emphasis on team-oriented play. In their first full season without Anthony, the Nuggets finished the regular season leading the league in points per game (104.12) and assists per game (23.96), though they were also near the bottom of the league in defensive rating. They pushed their first–round playoff series against the Lakers to seven games, but were defeated

The newly acquired Andre Iguodala immediately helped the team's defense, and the Nuggets finished with their best record since joining the NBA in 1977, at 57–25. Noted for his efforts in bringing the team together without Carmelo Anthony, their offensive success without a traditional go-to scorer, and his leadership for the league's third-youngest team (with an average age of 24.9 years), Karl was awarded his first NBA Coach of the Year Award for the 2012–13 season.

The Nuggets and Karl's historic season came to a disappointing end with a first-round playoff loss to the Golden State Warriors in six games. The Nuggets were without their second-leading scorer Danilo Gallinari, who was out with an ACL injury. The series was noted for its controversy, with Warriors coach Mark Jackson admitting he had "inside information" on Denver's playing style. Karl alleged Iguodala was the "mole" for the Warriors, which fueled speculation when he agreed to a four–year contract with Golden State following the playoff loss.

Following Denver GM Masai Ujiri's departure, Karl pushed the Nuggets for a contract extension, as he was entering the final season of his contract. On June 6, 2013, Karl was fired by Denver, just 29 days after he was named Coach of the Year.

George Karl left the Nuggets with a 423–257 record, just nine wins shy of Doug Moe's franchise–record 432 wins.

==== Sacramento Kings ====
On February 12, 2015, after several weeks of talks and speculation, Karl agreed to a deal to become the head coach of the Sacramento Kings, after signing a four-year, $15 million contract. He was officially introduced by the Kings on February 17. In his first season as coach the Kings went 11–19 in 30 games.

On April 14, 2016, Karl was fired by the Kings after a disappointing 2015–16 season in which the Kings went 33–49. Karl was also only one game shy from coaching his 2,000th game in the NBA.

== Personal life ==
Karl's son, Coby, played as a starting point guard for Boise State, and has since played in the NBA and other leagues. Coby Karl is a thyroid cancer survivor. Karl also has two daughters, Kelci and Kaci.

== Philanthropy ==
Karl is an avid supporter of St. Jude Children's Research Hospital and serves as an ambassador for their Hoops for St. Jude basketball initiative.

== Career playing statistics ==
Legend
| GP | Games played | GS | Games started | MPG | Minutes per game |
| FG% | Field goal percentage | 3P% | 3-point field goal percentage | FT% | Free throw percentage |
| RPG | Rebounds per game | APG | Assists per game | SPG | Steals per game |
| BPG | Blocks per game | PPG | Points per game | **Bold** | Career high |

=== ABA/NBA ===
==== Regular season ====
| Year | Team | GP | GS | MPG | FG% | 3P% | FT% | RPG | APG | SPG | BPG | PPG |
|---|---|---|---|---|---|---|---|---|---|---|---|---|
| 1973–74 | San Antonio (ABA) | 74 | | 18.1 | .470 | **.364** | .832 | 1.7 | 2.2 | .9 | **.1** | 7.8 |
| 1974–75 | San Antonio (ABA) | **82** | | **19.9** | **.489** | .174 | .774 | **1.9** | **4.1** | **1.2** | **.1** | **8.1** |
| 1975–76 | San Antonio (ABA) | 75 | | 16.0 | .449 | .000 | .764 | .9 | 3.3 | .8 | .0 | 5.1 |
| 1976–77 | San Antonio (NBA) | 29 | | 8.7 | .342 | | .690 | .6 | 1.6 | .3 | .0 | 2.7 |
| 1977–78 | San Antonio (NBA) | 4 | | 7.5 | .333 | | **1.000** | 1.3 | 1.3 | .3 | .0 | 1.5 |
| Career (ABA) | | 231 | | 18.0 | .472 | .222 | .788 | 1.5 | 3.2 | 1.0 | .1 | 7.0 |
| Career (NBA) | | 33 | | 8.5 | .342 | | .705 | .7 | 1.5 | .3 | .0 | 2.6 |
| Career (overall) | | 264 | | 16.9 | .465 | .222 | .780 | 1.4 | 3.0 | .9 | .1 | 6.5 |

==== Playoffs ====
| Year | Team | GP | GS | MPG | FG% | 3P% | FT% | RPG | APG | SPG | BPG | PPG |
|---|---|---|---|---|---|---|---|---|---|---|---|---|
| 1974 | San Antonio (ABA) | **7** | | **20.1** | **.464** | .000 | .400 | **2.1** | **3.3** | **1.4** | .0 | 4.0 |
| 1975 | San Antonio (ABA) | 4 | | 10.0 | .125 | .000 | **.750** | .8 | 1.3 | .3 | .0 | 1.3 |
| 1976 | San Antonio (ABA) | 6 | | 10.7 | .455 | .000 | .667 | .7 | 2.8 | .8 | .0 | **4.3** |
| 1977 | San Antonio (NBA) | 1 | | 1.0 | – | | – | .0 | .0 | .0 | .0 | .0 |
| Career (ABA) | | 17 | | 14.4 | .414 | .000 | .611 | 1.3 | 2.6 | .9 | .0 | 3.5 |
| Career (overall) | | 18 | | 13.7 | .414 | .000 | .611 | 1.2 | 2.5 | .9 | .0 | 3.3 |

== NBA coaching record ==
Legend
| Regular season | G | Games coached | W | Games won | L | Games lost | W–L % | Win–loss % |
| Playoffs | PG | Playoff games | PW | Playoff wins | PL | Playoff losses | PW–L % | Playoff win–loss % |

| Team | Year | G | W | L | W–L% | Finish | PG | PW | PL | PW–L% | Result |
|---|---|---|---|---|---|---|---|---|---|---|---|
| Cleveland | 1984–85 | 82 | 36 | 46 | .439 | 4th in Central | 4 | 1 | 3 | .250 | Lost in first round |
| Cleveland | 1985–86 | 67 | 25 | 42 | .373 | (fired) | — | — | — | — | — |
| Golden State | 1986–87 | 82 | 42 | 40 | .512 | 3rd in Pacific | 10 | 4 | 6 | .400 | Lost in Conf. Semifinals |
| Golden State | 1987–88 | 64 | 16 | 48 | .250 | (fired) | — | — | — | — | — |
| Seattle | 1991–92 | 42 | 27 | 15 | .643 | 4th in Pacific | 9 | 4 | 5 | .444 | Lost in Conf. Semifinals |
| Seattle | 1992–93 | 82 | 55 | 27 | .671 | 2nd in Pacific | 19 | 10 | 9 | .526 | Lost in Conf. Finals |
| Seattle | 1993–94 | 82 | 63 | 19 | .768 | 1st in Pacific | 5 | 2 | 3 | .400 | Lost in first round |
| Seattle | 1994–95 | 82 | 57 | 25 | .695 | 2nd in Pacific | 4 | 1 | 3 | .250 | Lost in first round |
| Seattle | 1995–96 | 82 | 64 | 18 | .780 | 1st in Pacific | 21 | 13 | 8 | .619 | Lost in NBA Finals |
| Seattle | 1996–97 | 82 | 57 | 25 | .695 | 1st in Pacific | 12 | 6 | 6 | .500 | Lost in Conf. Semifinals |
| Seattle | 1997–98 | 82 | 61 | 21 | .744 | T-1st in Pacific | 10 | 4 | 6 | .400 | Lost in Conf. Semifinals |
| Milwaukee | 1998–99 | 50 | 28 | 22 | .560 | 4th in Central | 3 | 0 | 3 | .000 | Lost in first round |
| Milwaukee | 1999–2000 | 82 | 42 | 40 | .512 | 5th in Central | 5 | 2 | 3 | .400 | Lost in first round |
| Milwaukee | 2000–01 | 82 | 52 | 30 | .634 | 1st in Central | 18 | 10 | 8 | .250 | Lost in Conf. Finals |
| Milwaukee | 2001–02 | 82 | 41 | 41 | .500 | 5th in Central | — | — | — | — | Missed Playoffs |
| Milwaukee | 2002–03 | 82 | 42 | 40 | .512 | 4th in Central | 6 | 2 | 4 | .333 | Lost in first round |
| Denver | 2004–05 | 40 | 32 | 8 | .800 | 2nd in Northwest | 5 | 1 | 4 | .200 | Lost in first round |
| Denver | 2005–06 | 82 | 44 | 38 | .537 | 1st in Northwest | 5 | 1 | 4 | .200 | Lost in first round |
| Denver | 2006–07 | 82 | 45 | 37 | .549 | 2nd in Northwest | 5 | 1 | 4 | .200 | Lost in first round |
| Denver | 2007–08 | 82 | 50 | 32 | .610 | 2nd in Northwest | 4 | 0 | 4 | .000 | Lost in first round |
| Denver | 2008–09 | 82 | 54 | 28 | .659 | 1st in Northwest | 16 | 10 | 6 | .625 | Lost in Conf. Finals |
| Denver | 2009–10 | 82 | 53 | 29 | .646 | 1st in Northwest | 6 | 2 | 4 | .250 | Lost in first round |
| Denver | 2010–11 | 82 | 50 | 32 | .644 | 2nd in Northwest | 5 | 1 | 4 | .200 | Lost in first round |
| Denver | 2011–12 | 66 | 38 | 28 | .576 | 2nd in Northwest | 7 | 3 | 4 | .429 | Lost in first round |
| Denver | 2012–13 | 82 | 57 | 25 | .695 | 2nd in Northwest | 6 | 2 | 4 | .333 | Lost in first round |
| Sacramento | 2014–15 | 30 | 11 | 19 | .367 | 4th in Pacific | — | — | — | — | Missed Playoffs |
| Sacramento | 2015–16 | 82 | 33 | 49 | .402 | 3rd in Pacific | — | — | — | — | Missed Playoffs |
| Career | | 1999 | 1,175 | 824 | .588 | | 185 | 80 | 105 | .432 | |
