= Mike Green (basketball, born 1951) =

American basketball player (born 1951)

Personal information
- Born: August 6, 1951 McComb, Mississippi, U.S.
- Died: September 25, 2018 (aged 67)
- Listed height: 6 ft 10 in (2.08 m)
- Listed weight: 200 lb (91 kg)

Career information
- High school: Higgins (McComb, Mississippi)
- College: Louisiana Tech (1969–1973)
- NBA draft: 1973: 1st round, 4th overall pick
- Drafted by: Seattle SuperSonics
- Playing career: 1973–1980
- Position: Center / power forward
- Number: 22, 23

Career history
- 1973–1975: Denver Rockets / Nuggets
- 1975–1976: Virginia Squires
- 1976–1977: Seattle SuperSonics
- 1977–1979: San Antonio Spurs
- 1979–1980: Kansas City Kings

Career highlights
- ABA All-Star (1975); ABA All-Rookie First Team (1973–1974); Southland Player of the Year (1973)

Career ABA and NBA statistics
- Points: 5,301 (11.5 ppg)
- Rebounds: 3,181 (6.9 rpg)
- Blocks: 752 (1.6 bpg)
- Stats at NBA.com
- Stats at Basketball Reference

Michael Kenneth Green (August 6, 1951–September 25, 2018) was an American professional basketball player. After playing at Louisiana Tech, Green played in the American Basketball Association (ABA) and the National Basketball Association (NBA) from 1973 to 1980 and was an All-Star in 1975.

== Basketball career ==
=== Collegiate career ===
A 6'10" center from Higgins High School in McComb, Mississippi, Green attended Louisiana Tech University, playing for Coach Scotty Robertson. Green remains the Bulldogs' all-time leading scorer and rebounder.

As a freshman in 1969–1970, Green averaged a double-double of 17.5 points and 13.1 rebounds. As a sophomore he averaged 18.9 points and 16.6 rebounds. As a junior, Green averaged 24.0 points and 15.9 rebounds.

As a Senior in 1972–1973, Green averaged 30.9 points and 15.7 rebounds for Louisiana Tech. He was named the Southland Conference Player of the Year as Louisiana Tech finished 20–6.

For his Louisiana Tech career, Green averaged 22.9 points and 15.4 rebounds in 102 games. He totaled 2,340 points from 1970 to 1973.

=== ABA/NBA career ===
Green was the 1st round pick (#4 overall) of the Seattle SuperSonics in the 1973 NBA draft. He chose to sign with the Denver Rockets of the American Basketball Association instead despite him also being drafted by the Indiana Pacers in the special 1973 ABA special circumstances draft.

Green played three seasons (1973–1976) in the American Basketball Association as a member of the Denver Rockets / Nuggets (1973–1975) and Virginia Squires (1975–1976). He averaged 15.1 points and 8.7 rebounds during his ABA career, was named to the 1974 ABA All-Rookie team, and appeared in the 1975 ABA All-Star Game.

From 1976 to 1980, Green played in the National Basketball Association as a member of the Seattle SuperSonics (1976–1977), San Antonio Spurs (1977–1979), and Kansas City Kings (1979–1980). Green averaged 8.4 points and 5.4 rebounds in his NBA career.

Overall, Green averaged 11.5 points, 6.9 rebounds 1.6 blocks and 1.3 assists in 459 ABA/NBA career games.

== Personal ==
Green resided in Denver. He was injured in a freak parking lot accident as a car salesman in Denver that led to vertebral surgery. He relied on a wheelchair after the surgery.

== Honors ==
- Green was a 1996 inductee into the Louisiana Sports Hall of Fame.
- In 2015, Green was inducted into the Louisiana Tech Athletics Hall of Fame.
