= George Gervin =

American basketball player (born 1952)

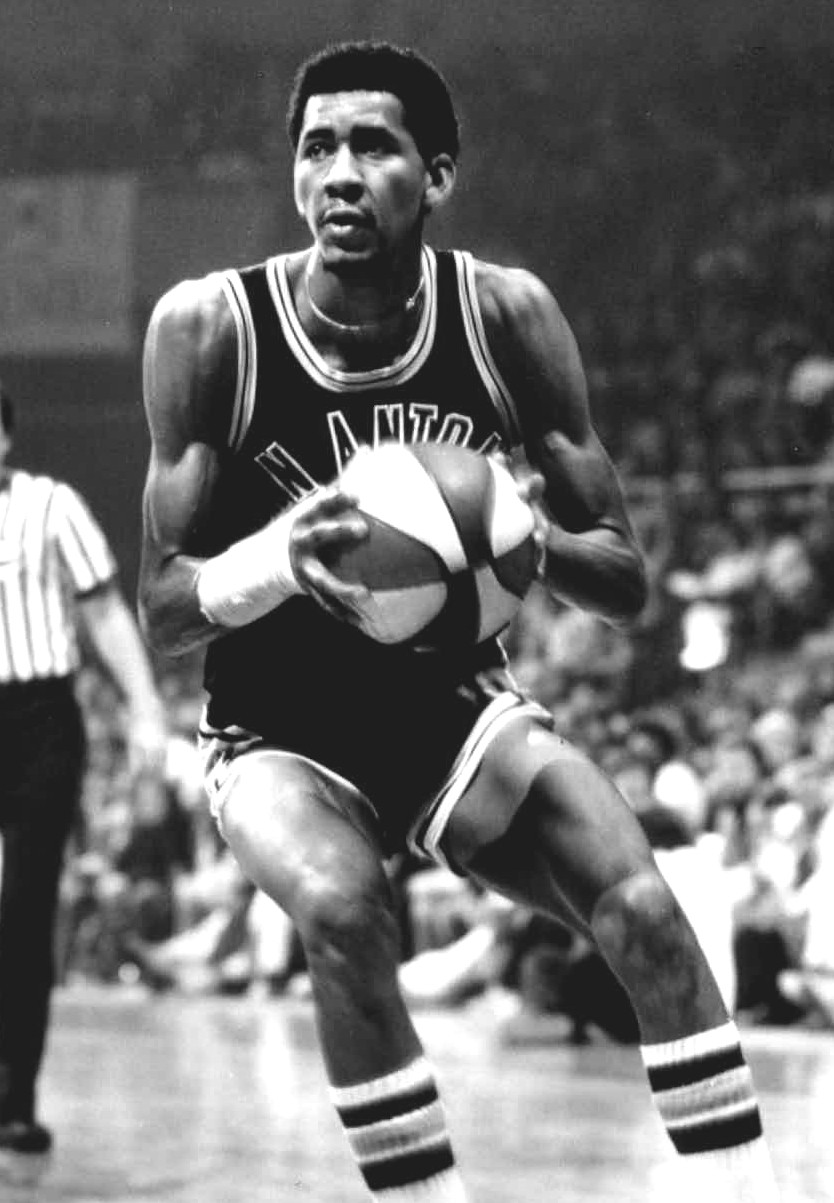
- Gervin with the San Antonio Spurs, c. 1970s

Personal information
- Born: April 27, 1952 (age 74) Detroit, Michigan, U.S.
- Listed height: 6 ft 7 in (2.01 m)
- Listed weight: 180 lb (82 kg)

Career information
- High school: Martin Luther King (Detroit, Michigan)
- College: Eastern Michigan (1970–1972)
- NBA draft: 1974: 3rd round, 40th overall pick
- Drafted by: Phoenix Suns
- Playing career: 1972–1990
- Position: Shooting guard / small forward
- Number: 44, 8
- Coaching career: 1992–1994

Career history

Playing
- 1972–1973: Pontiac Chaparrals
- 1973–1974: Virginia Squires
- 1974–1985: San Antonio Spurs
- 1985–1986: Chicago Bulls
- 1986–1987: Banco di Roma
- 1989: Quad City Thunder
- 1989–1990: TDK Manresa

Career highlights
- 9× NBA All-Star (1977–1985); NBA All-Star Game MVP (1980); 5× All-NBA First Team (1978–1982); 2× All-NBA Second Team (1977, 1983); 4× NBA scoring champion (1978–1980, 1982); 3× ABA All-Star (1974–1976); 2× All-ABA Second Team (1975, 1976); ABA All-Rookie Team (1973); No. 44 retired by San Antonio Spurs; NBA anniversary team (50th, 75th); ABA All-Time Team; No. 24 retired by Eastern Michigan Eagles

Career NBA and ABA statistics
- Points: 26,595 (25.1 ppg)
- Rebounds: 5,602 (5.3 rpg)
- Assists: 2,798 (2.6 apg)
- Stats at NBA.com
- Stats at Basketball Reference
- Basketball Hall of Fame
- Collegiate Basketball Hall of Fame

George Gervin (/ˈɡɜːrvɪn/ GHUR-vin; born April 27, 1952), nicknamed "the Iceman", is an American former professional basketball player who played in both the American Basketball Association (ABA) and National Basketball Association (NBA) for the Virginia Squires, San Antonio Spurs, and Chicago Bulls. Gervin averaged at least 14 points per game in all 14 of his ABA and NBA seasons, and finished with an NBA career average of 26.2 points per game. Widely regarded as one of the greatest shooting guards in NBA history, in 1996 Gervin was named as one of the 50 Greatest Players in NBA History, and in 2021 was included in the NBA's 75th Anniversary Team.

== Early life ==
George Gervin was born on April 27, 1952, in Detroit, Michigan. Gervin attended Martin Luther King Jr. High School. He struggled on and off the court until his senior year, when a growth spurt allowed him to average 31 points and 20 rebounds and lead his school to the state quarterfinals. He was a Detroit Free Press All-State selection in 1970.

== College career ==
Gervin received a scholarship to play under Coach Jerry Tarkanian at California State University, Long Beach, but he had such a culture shock that he returned home before the first semester was over. He transferred to Eastern Michigan University in Ypsilanti, Michigan and averaged 29.5 points as a sophomore forward in 1971–72.

While competing in an NCAA College Division national semifinal game in Evansville, Indiana, Gervin punched a Roanoke player. Gervin was suspended for the following season and eventually was removed from the team. Invitations to try out for the Olympic and Pan-American teams were withdrawn.

== Professional career ==
=== Pontiac Chaparrals (1972–1973) ===
In 1972–73, Gervin initially played in Michigan for the Pontiac Chaparrals of the Continental Basketball Association.

=== Virginia Squires (1973–1974) ===
While playing with Pontiac, Gervin was spotted by Johnny Kerr, a Vice President, Basketball Operations for the Virginia Squires of the ABA. In January 1973, Kerr signed Gervin to the Squires for a $40,000 a year contract.

Gervin's time in Virginia would be short-lived, however. The Squires' finances had never been stable, and they had been forced to start trading their best players to get enough money to stay alive. In the space of only four months, they traded Julius Erving and Swen Nater for cash and/or draft picks. During the 1974 ABA All-Star Weekend, rumors abounded that the Squires were in talks about dealing Gervin for cash. The rumors turned out to be true; on January 30, Gervin was traded to the Spurs for $228,000. The ABA tried to block the trade, claiming that by trading their last legitimate star, the Squires were holding a fire sale. However, a court sided with the Spurs. Within two years, the Squires were no more.

=== San Antonio Spurs (1974–1985) ===
After two seasons in the ABA, Gervin became NBA eligible in time for the 1974 NBA draft. The Phoenix Suns selected Gervin in the third round with the 40th pick, however Gervin elected to stay in the ABA and kept playing for the Spurs. With Gervin as the centerpiece, the Spurs transformed from a primarily defense-oriented team into an exciting fast-breaking team that played what coach Bob Bass called "schoolyard basketball". Although the Spurs never won an ABA playoff series during Gervin's first three years there, their high-powered offense made them very attractive to the NBA (along with their attendance figures in a relatively small media market), and the Spurs joined the more established league as part of the 1976 ABA–NBA merger. Right before the final ABA season, the Spurs had acquired star power forward Larry Kenon via trade, forming an offensively dominant one-two punch of both he and Gervin in order to strengthen their lineup and compete for a championship. In the final season of the ABA in 1976, the Spurs finished 3rd in a five-team postseason Playoff, which meant they faced the #2 seed New York Nets for the right to play in the 1976 ABA Finals. The Spurs pushed the Julius Erving-led Nets to a Game 7, but the Nets prevailed 121–114 on their way to the Finals, which they won.

Gervin's first NBA scoring crown came in the 1977–78 season, when he narrowly edged David Thompson for the scoring title by seven-hundredths of a point (27.22 to 27.15). Although Thompson came up with a memorable performance for the last game of the regular season, scoring 73 points, Gervin maintained his slight lead by scoring 63 points (including a then NBA record 33 points in the second quarter) in a loss during the last game of the regular season. With the scoring crown in hand, he sat out some of the third, and all of the fourth quarter. In the 1978–79 NBA season, the Spurs finished 48–34 with the second seed in the Eastern Conference, they had made it past Julius Erving and the Philadelphia 76ers in the second round, beating them in seven games as Gervin led the league in playoff scoring with 28.6 ppg. They were one win away from making it to the 1979 NBA Finals as they were up 3–1 against the Washington Bullets in the Conference Finals but collapsed by losing three straight to lose the series. Kenon would become a free agent and sign with the Bulls after the following season.

Despite disappointing playoff eliminations and not making it to the finals, Gervin was committed to the Spurs, showing no frustration towards his teammates, thus living up to his nickname and went on to lead the NBA in scoring average three years in a row from 1978 to 1980 (with a high of 33.1 points per game in 1979–80), and again in 1982. Prior to Michael Jordan, Gervin had the most scoring titles of any guard in league history. In 1981, while sitting out three games due to injury, Gervin's replacement, Ron Brewer, averaged over 30 ppg. When Gervin returned, he scored 40+ points. When asked if he was sending a message, Gervin said, "Just the way the Lord planned it" and added, "Ice be cool" (with Ron Brewer). In the 1981–82 season, the Spurs would once again compete for a championship. By then the Spurs had become a Western Conference franchise, finishing second in the conference with a 48–34 record. Gervin carried the team in scoring by leading the league with 29.4 ppg. They made it back to the Conference Finals but were swept by the number one seed Los Angeles Lakers, who would end up winning the championship that year. In the 1982 offseason, the Spurs drafted high-scoring guards Oliver Robinson of UAB and Tony Grier from South Florida and also traded for all-star center Artis Gilmore to take some offensive pressure off Gervin. This time with the addition of Gilmore, high-scoring forward Mike Mitchell, and some fresh young talent, the Spurs were once again a title contender in the 1982–83 season, finishing 53–29 with the number two seed in the Western Conference, making it back to the Conference Finals once again with Gervin leading the way, averaging 25.2 ppg, only to be defeated yet again by the top-seeded Los Angeles Lakers in six games.

=== Chicago Bulls (1985–1986) ===
Right before the 1985–86 season, Gervin was traded to the Chicago Bulls for forward David Greenwood after missing multiple preseason workouts amid the possibility of being relegated to the bench by new head coach, Cotton Fitzsimmons. The Bulls' rising star Michael Jordan stated he was "unhappy" after the trade. This season would be Gervin's last season in the NBA before retiring from the league. Although by this time he was aging and no longer at an all-star level, Gervin was still effective on the Bulls roster, averaging 16.2 ppg, had another 40-point game performance (a season-high 45 points against the Dallas Mavericks) and played all 82 games. The Bulls finished 30–52 but it was enough for a playoff berth clinching the number 8 seed in the Eastern Conference. The last NBA game of Gervin's career was April 20, 1986, Jordan's remarkable 63 point game against the Boston Celtics in Game 2 of the first round. Gervin recorded an assist and a personal foul in five minutes of play and the Bulls would later get swept by the Celtics in the first round.

=== Banco di Roma (1986–1987) ===
When he left the NBA, Gervin played for several years in Europe: In Italy for Banco Roma during the 1986–87 season where he averaged 26.1 points per game.

=== Quad City Thunder (1989) ===
In between his years of playing in Europe, Gervin also played for the Quad City Thunder of the now defunct Continental Basketball Association (different from the CBA he began his career with).

=== TDK Manresa (1989–1990) ===
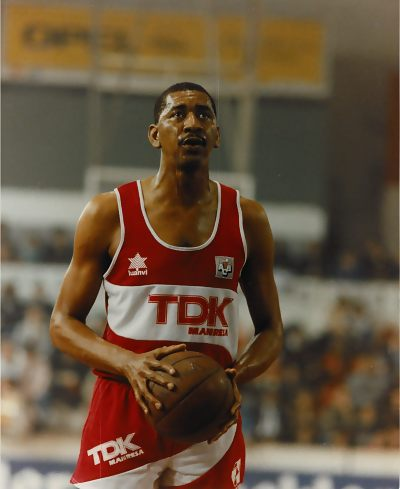
Gervin with TDK Manresa in 1990

Gervin played in the Spanish National Basketball League for TDK Manresa team (he was 38 years old at the time). At this point in his career he had lost some of his quickness, but his scoring instinct remained; he averaged 25.5 points, 5 rebounds and 1.2 assists, and in his last game he scored 31 points and grabbed 15 rebounds to keep Manresa in the first Spanish division.

== Coaching career ==
=== San Antonio Spurs (1992–1994) ===
Gervin coached for the Spurs from 1992 to 1994 and participated in the 1992 NBA All-Star Legends Game, where he scored 24 points and grabbed 11 rebounds in 16 minutes.

== Legacy ==
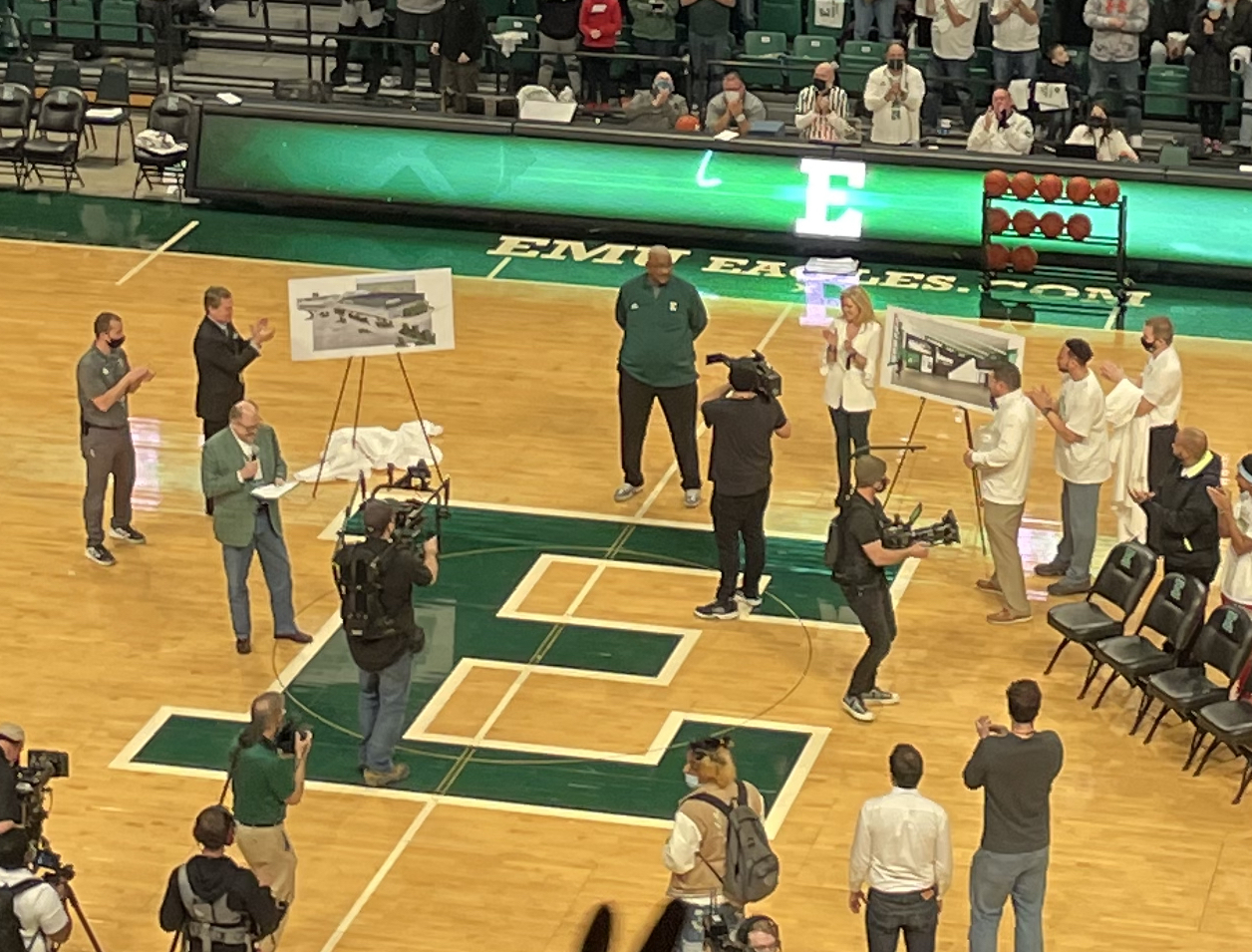
Halftime ceremony at a December 11, 2021 Eastern Michigan University basketball game, with Gervin being honored and the team's arena being rededicated as the "George Gervin GameAbove Center"

Nicknamed "Iceman" for his cool demeanor on the court, Gervin was primarily known for his scoring talents. He had also received the nickname because of his rare ability to play the game of basketball at a high level without sweating.

Gervin's trademark move was the finger roll, which he executed with unusual delicacy, touch, and range. Typically used by others to shoot short layups, Gervin's effectiveness with the shot extended all the way to the free-throw line.

Gervin's legacy has inspired other athletes. Basketball great Gary Payton has stated his childhood idol was Gervin and that he was his favorite player to watch. Gervin was also idolized by former NFL and Heisman-winning quarterback Ty Detmer. Detmer records in his autobiography that he was elated to receive Gervin's autograph one day as a youth in San Antonio.

In 2021, to commemorate the NBA's 75th Anniversary The Athletic ranked their top 75 players of all time, and named Gervin as the 42nd greatest player in NBA history.

== Awards and records ==
Gervin was inducted to the Naismith Memorial Basketball Hall of Fame in 1996; additionally, his #44 jersey has been retired by the Spurs and he was named as one of the 50 Greatest Players in NBA History. In 2009, Gervin was ranked #45 on SLAM Magazine's Top 50 NBA Players of All Time. In 2021, he was also named as one of the 75 greatest player in NBA history.

At the time of his trade to the Bulls, he held nearly every significant scoring record in Spurs history. Many of his records have been surpassed by David Robinson and Tim Duncan. Gervin retired with the most blocks by any guard in NBA history.

Though an NBA and ABA All-Star and Hall of Famer, Gervin never made an appearance with a team in either an NBA or ABA championship series during his 13-year career in American professional basketball.

- One of four players in NBA history to average 30 PPG and shoot 50 percent on field goals in a season as a guard.
  - Includes Michael Jordan, Stephen Curry and Shai Gilgeous-Alexander.

== Post-playing career ==
Gervin in 2004

Since retiring from professional basketball, George Gervin has been active in the San Antonio community by designing organizations for underprivileged children. In 1991, he established the George Gervin Youth Center.

In 2004, he returned to Detroit to fill in on morning drive for a week on WMXD during the interregnum between the dropping of Tom Joyner from the Clear Channel radio stations and the launch of the Steve Harvey Morning Show.

Gervin had an acting role in the 2025 film Marty Supreme as Lawrence, the owner of a table tennis club which Timothée Chalamet’s character frequents.

== Personal life ==
Gervin was born and raised in Detroit, Michigan.

In 1976, Gervin married Joyce King. The couple divorced in 1984 then remarried in 1985. They also have three children. The eldest child named George Gervin Jr. (nicknamed "Gee"), played for the Harlem Globetrotters and was a fan favorite while playing for the Norrköping Dolphins of the Swedish League. Gervin Jr. also played professionally in Mexico. Gervin's sister, Barbara Gervin-Hawkins, is a Democratic member of the Texas House of Representatives; she was married to basketball player Robert Hawkins. Gervin's younger brother, Derrick, is a retired basketball player who mostly played in the CBA and Europe.

== Career statistics ==
Legend
GP	Games played	GS	Games started	MPG	Minutes per game
FG%	Field goal percentage	3P%	3-point field goal percentage	FT%	Free throw percentage
RPG	Rebounds per game	APG	Assists per game	SPG	Steals per game
BPG	Blocks per game	PPG	Points per game	**Bold**	Career high
*	Led the league

=== Regular season ===
Season	Team	GP	GS	MIN	FG%	3P%	FT%	OFF	DEF	REB	AST	STL	BLK	PPG
1972–73	Virginia (ABA)	30	—	23.0	.472	.231	.814	1.1	3.1	4.3	1.1	—	—	14.1
1973–74	Virginia (ABA)	49	—	35.3	.472	.160	.799	2.2	**6.3**	**8.5**	2.0	1.5	**1.8**	25.4
1973–74	San Antonio (ABA)	25	—	31.3	.468	.000	.853	2.5	5.8	8.2	1.8	1.0	1.4	19.4
1974–75	San Antonio (ABA)	**84***	—	37.1	.474	.309	.830	**2.9**	5.4	8.3	2.5	1.6	1.6	23.4
1975–76	San Antonio (ABA)	81	—	33.9	.499	.255	.857	2.2	4.5	6.7	2.5	1.4	1.5	21.8
1976–77	San Antonio	**82**	—	33.0	**.544**	—	.833	1.6	3.9	5.5	2.9	1.3	1.3	23.1
1977–78	San Antonio	**82**	—	34.8	.536	—	.830	1.4	3.7	5.1	**3.7**	**1.7**	1.3	27.2*
1978–79	San Antonio	80	—	36.1	.541	—	.826	1.8	3.2	5.0	2.7	**1.7**	1.1	29.6*
1979–80	San Antonio	78	—	**37.6**	.528	.314	.852	2.0	3.2	5.2	2.6	1.4	1.0	**33.1***
1980–81	San Antonio	**82**	—	33.7	.492	.257	.826	1.5	3.6	5.1	3.2	1.1	0.7	27.1
1981–82	San Antonio	79	**79**	35.7	.500	.278	.864	1.7	3.2	5.0	2.4	1.0	0.6	32.3*
1982–83	San Antonio	78	78	36.3	.487	.364	.853	1.4	3.2	4.6	3.4	1.1	0.9	26.2
1983–84	San Antonio	76	76	34.0	.490	**.417**	.842	1.4	2.7	4.1	2.9	1.0	0.6	25.9
1984–85	San Antonio	72	69	29.0	.508	.000	.844	1.1	2.2	3.3	2.5	0.9	0.7	21.2
1985–86	Chicago	**82**	75	25.2	.472	.211	**.879**	1.0	1.7	2.6	1.8	0.6	0.3	16.2
NBA career		791	377	33.5	.511	.297	.844	1.5	3.1	4.6	2.8	1.2	0.8	26.2
ABA career		269	—	33.7	.480	.234	.831	2.3	5.1	7.4	2.2	1.4	1.6	21.9
Total career		1,060	377	33.6	.504	.271	.841	1.7	3.6	5.3	2.6	1.2	1.0	25.1

=== Playoffs ===
Season	Team	GP	GS	MIN	FG%	3P%	FT%	OFF	DEF	REB	AST	STL	BLK	PTS
1973	Virginia (ABA)	5	—	40.0	.442	.200	.706	3.2	4.4	7.6	1.6	—	—	18.6
1974	San Antonio (ABA)	7	—	32.3	.496	**1.000**	**.935**	3.0	4.4	7.4	2.7	0.7	1.1	20.6
1975	San Antonio (ABA)	6	—	**46.0**	.462	.250	.827	**5.7**	**8.3**	**14.0**	1.3	1.0	1.3	**34.0**
1976	San Antonio (ABA)	7	—	41.1	.499	.000	.812	3.3	5.9	9.1	2.7	0.6	2.0	27.1
1977	San Antonio	2	—	31.0	.432	—	.800	2.5	3.0	5.5	1.5	0.5	1.0	25.0
1978	San Antonio	6	—	37.8	**.549**	—	.768	1.8	3.8	5.7	3.2	1.0	**2.7**	33.2
1979	San Antonio	**14**	—	36.6	.536	—	.808	2.4	3.5	5.9	2.5	**1.9**	1.0	28.6
1980	San Antonio	3	—	40.7	.500	.000	.867	3.0	3.7	6.7	4.0	1.7	1.0	33.3
1981	San Antonio	7	—	39.1	.500	.000	.800	1.3	3.7	5.0	3.4	0.7	0.7	27.1
1982	San Antonio	9	—	41.4	.452	.000	.831	2.1	5.2	7.3	**4.6**	1.1	0.4	29.4
1983	San Antonio	11	—	39.7	.487	.000	.884	1.9	4.8	6.7	3.4	1.1	0.4	25.2
1985	San Antonio	5	**5**	36.6	.532	.000	.794	0.6	3.0	3.6	2.8	0.6	0.6	22.2
1986	Chicago	2	0	5.5	.000	—	—	0.0	0.5	0.5	0.5	0.0	0.0	0.0
Total career		84	5	38.0	.501	.147	.820	2.4	4.5	6.9	2.9	1.1	1.0	26.5

== See also ==
- List of NBA career scoring leaders
- List of NBA single-game scoring leaders
- List of NBA annual scoring leaders
