= Wayne Pack =

American basketball player

Personal information
- Born: July 5, 1950 (age 76) Indianapolis, Indiana, U.S
- Listed height: 6 ft 0 in (1.83 m)
- Listed weight: 165 lb (75 kg)

Career information
- High school: Washington (Indianapolis, Indiana)
- College: Tennessee Tech (1970–1973)
- NBA draft: 1973: undrafted
- Position: Point guard
- Number: 6

Career history
- 1974–1975: Indiana Pacers
- 1975: Iberia Superstars

Career highlights
- 2× First-team All-OVC (1971, 1973)
- Stats at Basketball Reference

Wayne Pack (born July 5, 1950, in Indianapolis, Indiana) is an American former professional basketball player who spent one season in the American Basketball Association (ABA) as a member of the Indiana Pacers.

== Career ==
Pack played collegiately for Tennessee Tech between 1970 and 1973. He scored over 1,200 points for the Golden Eagles (19th all-time for the college) at 16.7 points per game, adding over 400 assists (4th all-time). He was inducted into the Tennessee Tech Athletics Hall of Fame in 1996.

He was drafted by the San Diego Conquistadors in the 8th round of the 1973 ABA draft. He played for the Indiana Pacers during the 1974–75 ABA season. In February 1975, he joined the Iberia Superstars of the European Professional Basketball League.
