= Billy Harris (basketball) =

American basketball player

Personal information
- Born: September 12, 1951 Chicago, Illinois
- Died: January 3, 2010 (aged 58)
- Listed height: 6 ft 2 in (1.88 m)
- Listed weight: 185 lb (84 kg)

Career information
- High school: Dunbar (Chicago, Illinois)
- College: Northern Illinois (1970–1973)
- NBA draft: 1973: 7th round, 115th overall pick
- Drafted by: Chicago Bulls
- Position: Shooting guard
- Number: 6

Career history
- 1974–1975: San Diego Conquistadors

Career highlights
- First-team All-Midwestern (1972)

Career ABA statistics
- Points: 609 (8.0 ppg)
- Games: 76
- Stats at Basketball Reference

Billy "The Kid" Harris (November 12, 1951 – January 3, 2010) was an American basketball player.

Billy Harris grew up in Chicago, where he earned a reputation as a streetball star. A prolific long-range scorer, he was nicknamed "Billy the Kid" and "Shotgun". Scoop Jackson of the magazine SLAM later dubbed him the best playground basketball player ever. "No one has ever claimed to have seen, heard about or witnessed Billy having a bad game. Not one story, not one game," wrote Jackson.

Harris graduated from Dunbar High School in Chicago in 1969; he averaged a team-high 33 points per game as a senior. After being recruited by many colleges, including the University of Kansas, he played at Northern Illinois University from 1969 to 1973. During his junior season at NIU, he led the team to a 21–4 record, which was good enough for NIU to be ranked in the national top 20 for the first time in school history. Harris tallied 17.8 points per game that season, and 24.1 points per game the next season.

After college, Billy Harris was drafted by the Chicago Bulls in the seventh round of the 1973 NBA draft. However, he did not make the team, and instead played in the American Basketball Association with the San Diego Conquistadors and in the Philippines. Later in his life, Billy Harris coached basketball for young people in his Chicago neighborhood and became a car salesman. He was inducted into the Northern Illinois Athletics Hall of Fame in 2001 and the Illinois Basketball Coaches Association Hall of Fame in 2002.

On January 3, 2010, Harris died of a stroke at Advocate Illinois Masonic Medical Center in Chicago. He is survived by his six children, eight bonus children, three brothers, one sister, and many grandchildren.
