= Continental Basketball Association (1969–1974) =

U.S. semi-professional basketball league

The Continental Basketball Association (CBA) was an American semi-professional basketball league that operated from 1969 to 1974.

Founded in 1969, the league originally began from an idea to keep the football players from the Central States Football League in shape during the offseason. The Continental name was chosen over Central States Basketball League so that it would be more inviting to potential teams outside of Illinois and Wisconsin, where the football league was based. The CBA played using National Basketball Association rules, which included a 24-second shot clock. Each team played a 20-game schedule, divided into 10 home games and 10 away.

The six inaugural teams in 1969–70 were located in Illinois (Decatur, Peoria, Rockford and Waukegan), Michigan (Grand Rapids) and Wisconsin (Waukesha). The Waukesha team began the season based in Cudahy, Wisconsin, but moved mid-season due to lack of fan support. Though they were on top of the league's standings, the Medalist Mods were second to last in attendance. Waukesha went on to win the league title that season.

During the 1970–71 season, the NBA Milwaukee Bucks entered a player-development agreement with the CBA Milwaukee Muskies. The Bucks ended the relationship the following season and the Muskies folded as a result. The Chicagoland Travelers (originally named the Northwest Chicagoland Travelers) also folded after the 1970–71 season because they failed to come up with the $20,000–$30,000 in annual operating costs.

The CBA folded after its 1973–74 season.

League champions
| Season | Team | Ref |
|---|---|---|
| 1969–70 | Waukesha Medalist Mods | |
| 1970–71 | Rockford Royals | |
| 1971–72 | Lake County Lakers | |
| 1972–73 | Grand Rapids Tackers | |
| 1973–74 | Grand Rapids Tackers | |
