= Craig Littlepage =

Biographical details
- Born: August 5, 1951 (age 74); La Mott, Pennsylvania, U.S.

Playing career
- 1970–1973: Penn

Coaching career (HC unless noted)
- 1973–1975: Villanova (assistant)
- 1975–1976: Yale (assistant)
- 1976–1982: Virginia (assistant)
- 1982–1985: Penn
- 1985–1988: Rutgers
- 1988–1990: Virginia (assistant)

Administrative career (AD unless noted)
- 1990–1991: Virginia (asst. AD)
- 1991–1995: Virginia (assoc. AD)
- 1995–2001: Virginia (sr. assoc. AD)
- 2001–2017: Virginia

Craig Littlepage (born August 5, 1951) is an American college athletics administrator and former basketball player and coach. He is the former athletic director at the University of Virginia. He was named to that position in 2001 and has been with the school as an administrator since 1990. Littlepage served as the head men's basketball coach at the University of Pennsylvania from 1982 to 1985 and at Rutgers University from 1985 to 1988.

== Early career ==
Littlepage played basketball for the University of Pennsylvania and graduated from Penn's Wharton School in 1973 with a degree in economics. He served as an assistant coach at Villanova University and Yale University before coming to the University of Virginia in 1976 as an assistant coach for Terry Holland. Littlepage's alma mater Penn hired him as head coach in 1982. He then was hired as head coach by Rutgers University in 1985. After Littlepage was dismissed as head coach of the Scarlet Knights in 1988, he returned to Virginia and again served as an assistant until 1990 when Holland resigned and was replaced by Jeff Jones.

== University of Virginia ==
On August 21, 2001, University of Virginia President John T. Casteen III announced Littlepage's appointment to be the ninth Virginia Athletics Director. He was the first Black athletics director in UVa history. In 2003 and 2006, he was named the Black Coaches Association's "Athletics Administrator of the Year." He was also listed on Sports Illustrated's list of the 101 most influential minorities in sports in 2003 and 2004. Littlepage created a motto of "uncompromised excellence in intercollegiate athletics," and led Virginia athletics to achieving success in a broad range of sports.

In 2003, following a controversial performance by the Virginia Pep Band at the 2002 Continental Tire Bowl in which the band lampooned the home state of the opposing West Virginia Mountaineers and was banned from any future performance at the bowl, Littlepage banned the Pep Band from participating in any Cavalier varsity sports. A donation from Carl Smith allowed the formation of the Cavalier Marching Band.

In 2006, he headed the NCAA Men's Division I Basketball Committee. The committee's most prominent duty was to select the 65 teams that participate in the NCAA Division I men's basketball tournament.

At the beginning of the 2008 football season, Littlepage briefly banned signs from all school athletic events. Following a student protest at the school's second home game of the season, in which ESPN's Rick Reilly encouraged students to bring in blank signs and signs that said, "This is not a sign," Littlepage repealed the ban.

Among the head coaching hires Littlepage has made at Virginia includes Dave Leitao and Tony Bennett for men's basketball, Joanne Boyle for women's basketball, Brian O'Connor in baseball, and Mike London and Bronco Mendenhall in football.

On September 5, 2017, Littlepage announced his retirement, to commence when a successor is named. Carla Williams was formally named his successor on October 22, 2017.
