= United States Basketball League =

American basketball league

- Sport: Basketball
- Founded: 1985
- Folded: 2008
- Motto: "The League of Opportunity"
- Country: US
- Continent: FIBA Americas (Americas)
- Last champion: Kansas Cagerz (1st title)
- Most titles: Atlantic City Seagulls; Dodge City Legend; Miami Tropics (3 titles each)

The United States Basketball League (USBL) was a professional men's spring basketball league. The league was formed in 1985 and ceased operations in 2008.

== History ==
The United States Basketball League was founded in December 1984 by Daniel T. Meisenheimer, from Connecticut. The league management initially planned to schedule about 40 games during the summer, and started to look for new teams to join the newly formed USBL. Former NBA referee Richie Powers was named the league's vice president and director of operations, while Earl Monroe was the commissioner. Meisenheimer introduced a salary cap of $250,000 per team. The teams for the first season were the Connecticut Colonials from New Haven, Connecticut; the New Jersey Jammers from Jersey City, New Jersey; the Long Island Knights from Long Island, New York (owned by Meisenheimer himself); the Rhode Island Gulls from Warwick, Rhode Island; the Springfield Fame from Springfield, Massachusetts; the Westchester Golden Apples from Westchester, New York; and the Wildwood Aces from Wildwood, New Jersey.

Several players with NBA experience joined the USBL: among them Ken Bannister, Jim Bostic, Tracy Jackson, Lowes Moore, Eddie Lee Wilkins and Sam Worthen. Other players who played in the 1985 USBL season would later play in the NBA, such as Michael Adams, Manute Bol, Ron Crevier, Spud Webb and John "Hot Rod" Williams. The first ever game in USBL was played on May 25, 1985, between Rhode Island Gulls and Springfield Fame (94-101) at the Springfield Civic Center. After the regular season ended after each team played 25 games, the league management decided not to organize postseason games, since many players were going to join other teams for the start of the regular season of other leagues such as the NBA or the CBA. The first USBL champions were the Springfield Fame, that had ended the regular season leading the league with a 19–6 record. Hot Rod Williams and Tracy Jackson were named co-MVPs, while Manute Bol led the league both in rebounds per game (14.2) and blocks per game (11.2).

In 1986 two teams, the Long Island Knights and the Rhode Island Gulls, left the league, and three new franchises joined the USBL: the Gold Coast Stingrays from West Palm Beach, Florida, the Staten Island Stallions from Staten Island, New York and the Tampa Bay Flash from Tampa, Florida. In the same year Nancy Lieberman joined the Springfield Fame and became the first female player to play in a professional league with men. Lieberman debuted in June 1986 in a game against the Staten Island Stallions, playing 3 minutes during which she did not score. In 1987 another woman joined the USBL: Lynette Richardson, who had played college basketball at Florida International, signed for the Miami Tropics. On June 13, 1987, Richardson and Lieberman played against each other during a game between the Miami Tropics and the Long Island Knights: Richardson scored 3 points while Lieberman scored 2.

The top teams of the regular season advanced to the USBL Postseason Festival, a playoffs system that saw teams play single elimination games in order to advance to the final game. On three occasions (1985, 1986 and 1990) no postseason was held, and the team with the best regular season record won the championship. In 1989 the USBL ceased operations temporarily in order to improve its organization, and resumed the following season, in 1990.

== Salary cap ==
In 1985, the league introduced a salary cap of $250,000 per team. In 1992, the salary cap was $40,000, with rookies being paid $315 per week. In 1998 it had remained the same, as each franchise had a regular season salary cap of $40,000, which meant that an average player earned roughly around $400 a week during the 2-month season of the league (rosters of 10 players). As reported in 2000, the annual salary cap of the league was $47,500 for a franchise, for all its players. No player was allowed to receive more than $1,000 per week as salary.

== USBL Draft ==
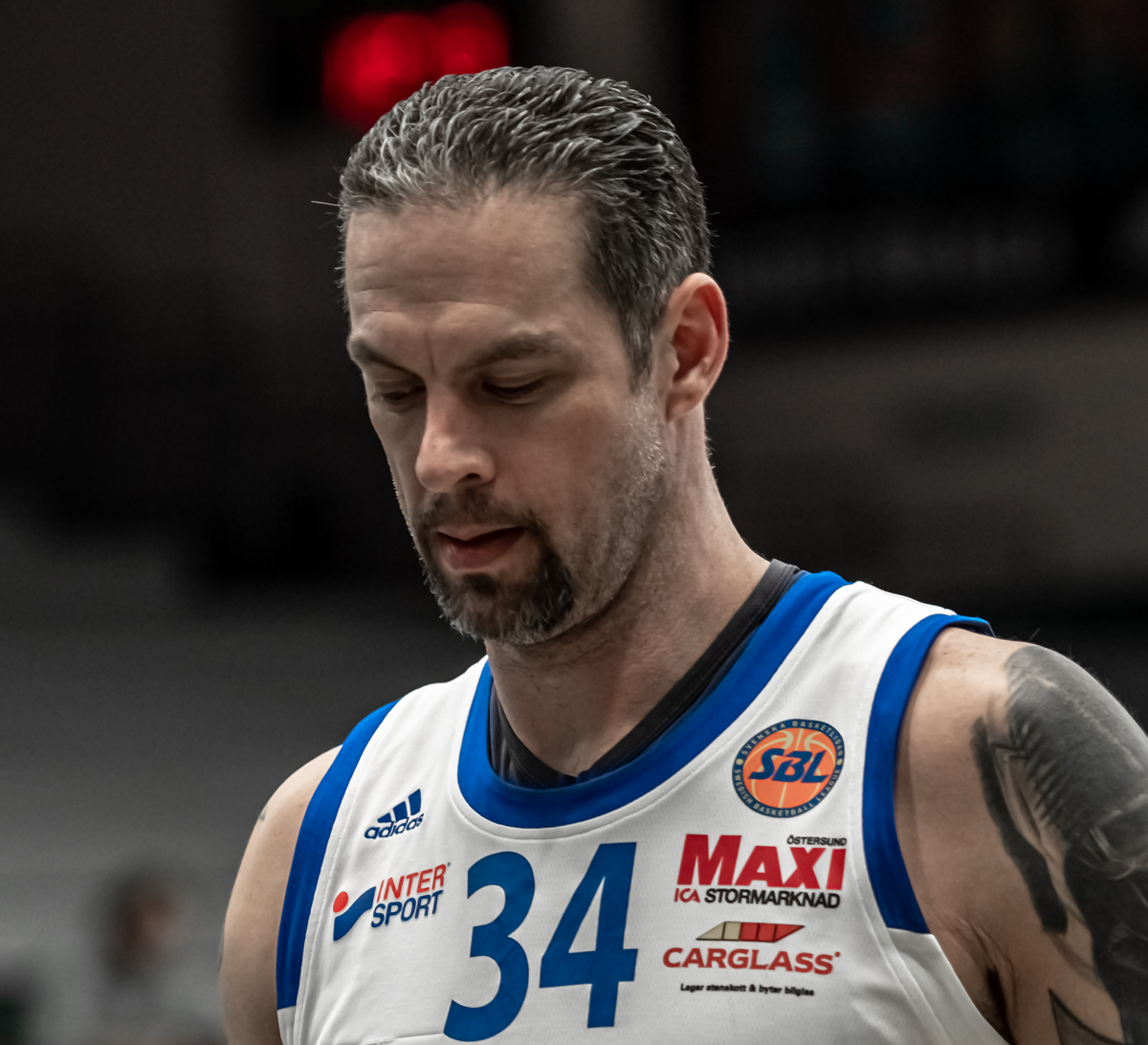
R. T. Guinn was the first pick in 2004.

First picks are as below:

USBL 1st overall picks

Year	Player	USBL pick by	College
1985	(United States) Jeff Allen	Connecticut Skyhawks	St. John's Red Storm
1986	(United States) John "Hot Rod" Williams	Rhode Island Gulls	Tulane Green Wave
1992	(United States) Tony Smith	New Jersey Jammers	Pfeiffer Falcons
1995	(United States) Arthur Agee	Florida Sharks	Arkansas State Red Wolves
1996	(United States) Stephon Marbury	Long Island Surf	Georgia Tech Yellow Jackets
1998	(United States) Doug Gottlieb	Oklahoma Storm	Oklahoma State Cowboys
2000	(United States) Detric Golden	Gulf Coast SunDogs	Troy Trojans
2001	(United States) George Evans	Maryland Mustangs	George Mason Patriots
2002	(United States) John Linehan	St. Joseph Express	Providence Friars
2003	(United States) Bingo Merriex	Texas Rim Rockers	TCU Horned Frogs
2004	(United States) R. T. Guinn	Cedar Rapids River Raiders	Baylor Bears
2005	(United States) Jared Homan	Nebraska Cranes	Iowa State Cyclones
2006	(United States) Gerry McNamara	NEPA Breakers	Syracuse Orange
2007	(United States) Michael Haddix	Albany Patroons	Siena Saints

== USBL Champions ==
Source:nbahoopsonline.com

=== Championship finals ===
Teams played a single championship game at the end of the playoffs to name the league champions

Year	Champion	Score	Runner-up	Regular season champion	Finals MVP	Winning coach	Notes
1985	Springfield Fame	-	New Jersey Jammers	Springfield Fame	-	(United States) Gerald Oliver	Springfield Fame record (19–6), won regular season, no playoffs
1986	Tampa Bay Flash	-	Springfield Fame	Tampa Bay Flash	-	(United States) Gordon Gibbons	Tampa Bay Flash record (22–8), won regular season, no playoffs
1987	Miami Tropics	103 - 99	Rhode Island Gulls	Tampa Bay Stars	(United States) World B. Free	(United States) Sam Worthen	
1988	New Haven Skyhawks	134 - 126	Palm Beach Stingrays	Jacksonville Hooters	(United States) Bobby Parks	(United States) Murray Knox	
1990	Jacksonville Hooters	-	New Haven Skyhawks	Jacksonville Hooters	N/A	(United States) Rex Morgan	Jacksonville Hooters record (15–1), won regular season, no playoffs
1991	Philadelphia Spirit	110 - 108	Miami Tropics	Philadelphia Spirit	(United States) Paul Graham	(United States) Bill Lange	
1992	Miami Tropics	116 - 116	Philadelphia Spirit	Philadelphia Spirit	(United States) Duane Washington	(United States) John Lucas	
1993	Miami Tropics (3)	139 - 127	Westchester Stallions	Daytona Beach Hooters	(United States) Ken Bannister	(United States) John Lucas (2)	
1994	Jacksonville Hooters (2)	117 - 109	Atlanta Trojans	Mississippi Coast Gamblers	(United States) Fred Lewis	(United States) Rex Morgan (2)	
1995	Florida Sharks	109 - 104	Atlanta Trojans	Florida Sharks	(United States) Charles Smith	(United States) Eric Musselman	
1996	Florida Sharks (2)	118 - 115	Atlantic City Seagulls	Atlantic City Seagulls	(United States) Charles Smith (2)	(United States) Eric Musselman (2)	
1997	Atlantic City Seagulls	114 - 112	Long Island Surf	Atlantic City Seagulls	(United States) Mark Baker, (United States) Brent Scott	(United States) Kevin Mackey	
1998	Atlantic City Seagulls	100 - 96	Long Island Surf	Atlantic City Seagulls	(United States) Adrian Griffin	(United States) Kevin Mackey	
1999	Atlantic City Seagulls (3)	83 - 77	Connecticut Skyhawks	Atlantic City Seagulls	(United States) Adrian Griffin (2)	(United States) Kevin Mackey (3)	
2000	Dodge City Legend	89 - 86	Oklahoma Storm	Pennsylvania ValleyDawgs	(United States) Artie Griffin	(United States) Kent Davidson	
2001	Pennsylvania ValleyDawgs	100 - 91	Dodge City Legend	Maryland Mustangs	(United States) Frantz Pierre-Louis, (United States) Ace Custis	(United States) Darryl Dawkins	
2002	Oklahoma Storm	122 - 109	Kansas Cagerz	Brevard Blue Ducks	(United States) Ira Clark	(United States) Kareem Abdul-Jabbar	
2003	Dodge City Legend	97 - 96	Pennsylvania ValleyDawgs	Westchester Wildfire	(United States) Darrin Hancock	(United States) Cliff Levingston	
2004	Pennsylvania ValleyDawgs (2)	118 - 116	Brooklyn Kings	Pennsylvania ValleyDawgs	(United States) Marcus Fleming	(United States) Darryl Dawkins (2)	
2005	Dodge City Legend (3)	97 - 84	Kansas Cagerz	Brooklyn Kings	(United States) Jermaine Boyette	(United States) Dale Osbourne	
2006	Nebraska Cranes	100 - 92	Dodge City Legend	Brooklyn Kings	(United States) Alex Sanders	(United States) Brian Walsh	
2007	Kansas Cagerz	95 - 92	Brooklyn Kings	Dodge City Legend	(United States) Nate Johnson	(United States) Francis Flax	

- In 1989 and 2008, USBL suspended operations.

=== Division champions ===
Northern - Southern era

Year	Northern	Winning coach	Southern	Winning coach	Mid-Atlantic Division	Winning coach
1991	Philadelphia Spirit	(United States) Bill Lange	Miami Tropics	(United States) John Lucas		
1992	Philadelphia Spirit (2)	(United States) Bill Lange (2)	Miami Tropics (2)	(United States) John Lucas (2)		
1996	Atlantic City Seagulls	(United States) Mike Gatley	Florida Sharks	(United States) Eric Musselman		
1997	Atlantic City Seagulls (2)	(United States) Kevin Mackey	Atlanta Trojans	(United States) Derek Howard		
1998	Long Island Surf	(United States) James Ryans	Jacksonville Barracudas	(United States) Rex Morgan	Atlantic City Seagulls	(United States) Kevin Mackey
1999	Connecticut Skyhawks	(United States) Roy Hodge	Kansas Cagerz	(United States) Tom Hughes	Atlantic City Seagulls (2)	(United States) Kevin Mackey
2000	Pennsylvania ValleyDawgs	(United States) Darryl Dawkins	Dodge City Legend	(United States) Kent Davidson		
2001	Maryland Mustangs	(United States) Robert Parish	Oklahoma Storm	(United States) Bryan Gates		

Eastern - Mid-West era

Year	Eastern	Winning coach	Mid-West	Winning coach
2002	Brevard Blue Ducks	(United States) Harvey Grant	Kansas Cagerz	(United States) Francis Flax
2003	Pennsylvania ValleyDawgs	(United States) Darryl Dawkins	Dodge City Legend	(United States) Cliff Levingston
2004	Brooklyn Kings	(United States) Ken Charles	Dodge City Legend (2)	(United States) Dale Osbourne
2005	Brooklyn Kings	(United States) Ken Charles	Oklahoma Storm	(United States) Bryan Gates
2006	Brooklyn Kings (3)	(United States) Ken Charles (3)	Oklahoma Storm (2)	(United States) Bryan Gates (2)

- Division groups started in 1991. There were not held (one single group) between 1993 and 1995 and in 2007. The Mid-Atlantic Division lasted for only two seasons (1998 and 1999).

== Complete team list ==
Locations of final USBL teams and divisions

- Albany Patroons (2006–07)
- Atlanta Trojans (1991–99, as Atlanta Eagles in 1991–93)
- Atlantic City Seagulls (1996–2001)
- Brevard Blue Ducks (1988, 1990–2004, as Jacksonville Hooters in 1988, 1990–92; as Daytona Beach Hooters in 1993; as Jacksonville Hooters in 1994; as Jacksonville Shooters in 1995; as Jacksonville Barracudas in 1996–98; as Gulf Coast SunDogs in 1999–2000; as Lakeland Blue Ducks in 2001; back to being the Brevard Blue Ducks in 2002–2004)
- Brooklyn Kings (1999–2007)
- Camden Power (1997–98, as Philadelphia Power in 1997)
- Carolina Cardinals (1996)
- Cedar Rapids River Raiders (2004)
- Connecticut Skyhawks (1985, 1988, 1990–2001, as Connecticut Colonels in 1985; as New Haven Skyhawks in 1988, 1990–92)
- Delaware Stars (2007)
- Dodge City Legend (2000–2007)
- Empire State Stallions (1991)
- Florence Flyers
- Florida Sea Dragons (2000–02, as Tampa Bay Windjammers in 1996–99)
- Florida Sharks (1995–97)
- Gary Steelheads (2007)
- Jackson Jackals (1995)
- Jackson Wildcats (2007), as Adirondack Wildcats (2002–04)
- Jersey Shore Bucs (1988)
- Jersey Turnpikes (1995)
- Kansas Cagerz (1998–2007, as Columbus Cagerz in 1998)
- Long Island Surf (1985, 1987–88, 1991–2001, as Long Island Knights in 1985, 1987–88)
- Maryland Mustangs (2001)
- Memphis Fire (1994–95)
- Miami Tropics (1987–88, 1991–1995)
- Mississippi Coast Gamblers (1994)
- Nebraska Cranes (2005–2006)
- New Hampshire Thunder Loons (1996–99)
- New Jersey Jammers (1985–88, 1992, as Jersey Jammers in 1986–88)
- New Jersey Flyers (2004–05, as Florence Flyers in 2004)
- New Jersey Meteors (2007)
- New Jersey ShoreCats (1998–2001)
- New York Whitecaps (1991)
- Northeast Pennsylvania Breakers (2006–2007)
- Oklahoma Storm (2000–2007)
- Palm Beach Stingrays (1986–88, 1990, 1992–94, as Gold Coast Stingrays in 1986; as West Palm Beach Stingrays in 1987)
- Pennsylvania ValleyDawgs (1999–2006)
- Philadelphia Aces (1985–88, 1990 as Wildwood Aces in 1985–86)
- Philadelphia Spirit (1991–92)
- Portland Wave (1996–97, as Portland Mountain Cats in 1996)
- Raleigh Cougars (1997–99)
- Rhode Island Gulls (1985, 1987)
- Saint Joseph Express (2002, 2004)
- Saint Louis Skyhawks (2002–2004)
- Springfield Fame (1985–86)
- Staten Island Stallions (1986–87)
- Suncoast Sunblasters (1991)
- Tampa Bay Stars (1986–87, as Tampa Bay Flash in 1986)
- Tampa Bay Sunblasters (1992)
- Texas Rim Rockers (2003–04), no relationship to the American Basketball Association (2000-present) team of the same name
- Treasure Coast Tropics (1996, as Miami Tropics in 1987–88, 1991–95)
- Tulsa Tough-Necks (1999–2000)
- Washington Congressionals (1998–2000)
- Westchester Golden Apples (1985–86)
- Westchester Kings (1997)
- Westchester Stallions (1993–94)
- Westchester Wildfire (2003–05)

== League awards ==
=== Player of the Year ===
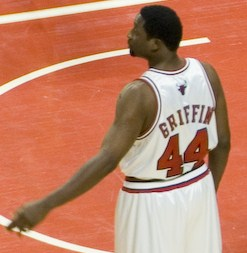
Adrian Griffin was the player of the year in 1999.

Year	Player	Team	Reference
1985	(United States) John "Hot Rod" Williams	Rhode Island Gulls	
1985	(United States) Tracy Jackson	Springfield Flame	
1986	(United States) Don Collins	Tampa Bay Flash	
1987	(United States) Don Collins (2)	Tampa Bay Stars	
1988	(United States) Lewis Lloyd	Philadelphia Aces	
1989	League suspends operations for the 1989 season		
1990	(United States) Jerry Johnson	Jacksonville Hooters	
1991	(United States) Michael Anderson	Philadelphia Spirit	
1992	(United States) Roy Tarpley	Miami Tropics	
1993	(United States) Ken Bannister	Miami Tropics	
1994	(United States) Stan Rose	Atlanta Trojans	
1995	(United States) Charles Smith	Florida Sharks	
1996	(United States) Brent Scott	Portland Mountain Cats	
1997	(United States) Dennis Edwards	Florida Sharks	
1998	(United States) Curt Smith	Washington Congressionals	
1999	(United States) Adrian Griffin	Atlantic City Seagulls	
2000	(United States) Sean Colson	Dodge City Legend	
2001	(United States) Jason Lampa	Brooklyn Kings	
2002	(United States) Kwan Johnson	Brevard Blue Ducks	
2003	(United States) Albert Mouring	Oklahoma Storm	
2004	(United States) Chudney Gray	Brooklyn Kings	
2005	(United States) Nate Johnson	Kansas Cagerz	
2006	(United States) Quannas White	Oklahoma Storm	
2007	(United States) Anthony Richardson	Kansas Cagerz	

=== Postseason Festival MVP ===
Year	Player	Team	Reference
1987	(United States) World B. Free	Miami Tropics	
1988	(United States) Bobby Parks	New Haven Skyhawks	
1989	League suspends operations for 1989 season		
1990			
1991	(United States) Paul Graham	Philadelphia Spirit	
1992	(United States) Duane Washington	Miami Tropics	
1993	(United States) Ken Bannister	Miami Tropics	
1994	(United States) Fred Lewis	Jacksonville Hooters	
1995	(United States) Charles Smith	Florida Sharks	
1996	(United States) Charles Smith (2)	Florida Sharks	
1997	(United States) Mark Baker	Atlantic City Seagulls	
1997	(United States) Brent Scott	Atlantic City Seagulls	
1998	(United States) Adrian Griffin	Atlantic City Seagulls	
1999	(United States) Adrian Griffin (2)	Atlantic City Seagulls	
2000			
2001	(United States) Frantz Pierre-Louis	Pennsylvania ValleyDawgs	
2001	(United States) Ace Custis	Pennsylvania ValleyDawgs	
2002	(United States) Joe Ira Clark	Oklahoma Storm	
2003	(United States) Darrin Hancock	Dodge City Legend	
2004	(United States) Marcus Fleming	Pennsylvania ValleyDawgs	
2005	(United States) Jermaine Boyette	Dodge City Legend	
2006	(United States) Alex Sanders	Nebraska Cranes	
2007	(United States) Nate Johnson	Kansas Cagerz	

=== Rookie of the Year ===
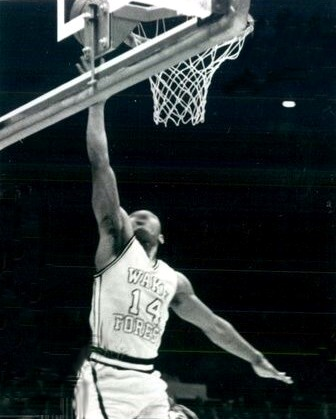
Muggsy Bogues was the rookie of the year in 1987.

Year	Player	Team	Reference
1985	(United States) John "Hot Rod" Williams	Rhode Island Gulls	
1986	(United States) Marty Embry	Jersey Jammers	
1987	(United States) Muggsy Bogues	Rhode Island Gulls	
1988	(United States) Ricky Grace	Jersey Shore Bucs	
1989	League suspends operations for 1989 season		
1990	(United States) Randy Henry	Jacksonville Hooters	
1991	(United States) Greg Sutton	Empire State Stallions	
1992	(United States) Fred Lewis	Jacksonville Hooters	
1993	(United States) Khari Jaxon	Palm Beach Stingrays	
1994	(United States) Randy Carter	Memphis Fire	
1995	(United States) Roger Crawford	Memphis Fire	
1996	(United States) Mike Lloyd	Atlantic City Seagulls	
1997	(United States) Mikki Moore	Atlanta Trojans	
1998	(United States) Kerry Thompson	Tampa Bay Windjammers	
1999	(United States) Adrian Pledger	New Hampshire Thunder Loons	
2000	(United States) Jason Lampa	Long Island Surf	
2001	(United States) George Evans	Maryland Mustangs	
2002	(United States) Devin Brown	Kansas Cagerz	
2002	(United States) Corsley Edwards	Adirondack Wildcats	
2003	(United States) Lenny Cooke	Brooklyn Kings	
2004	(United States) Tony Bland	Brevard Blue Ducks	
2005	(United States) Badou Gaye	Westchester Wildfire	
2005	(United States) John Allen	New Jersey Flyers	
2006	(United States) Tristan Smith	Long Island PrimeTime	
2007	(United States) Adam Schaper	Gary Steelheads	

=== Coach of the Year ===
Year	Coach	Team	GC	W	L	Pct.
1985	(United States) Gerald Oliver	Springfield Flame				
1986	(United States) Henry Bibby	Springfield Flame				
1987	(United States) Gordon Gibbons	Tampa Bay Stars				
1988	(United States) Dave Ervin	Philadelphia Aces				
1989	League suspends operations for 1989 season					
1990	(United States) Rex Morgan	Jacksonville Hooters				
1991	(United States) Bill Lange	Philadelphia Spirit				
1992	(United States) Al Outlaw	Atlanta Eagles				
1993	(United States) John Lucas II	Miami Tropics				
1994	(United States) Al Outlaw (2)	Atlanta Trojans				
1995	(United States) Mike Mashak	Jersey Turnpikes				
1996	(United States) Eric Musselman	Florida Sharks				
1997	(United States) Kevin Mackey	Atlantic City Seagulls				
1998	(United States) Ray Hodge	Connecticut Skyhawks				
1999	Darryl Dawkins	Pennsylvania ValleyDawgs				
1999	(United States) Kevin Mackey (2)	Atlantic City Seagulls				
2000	(United States) Kent Davidson	Dodge City Legend				
2001	(United States) Robert Parish	Maryland Mustangs				
2002	(United States) Francis Flax	Kansas Cagerz				
2002	(United States) Harvey Grant	Brevard Blue Ducks				
2003	(United States) Cliff Levingston	Dodge City Legend				
2004	(United States) Dale Osbourne	Dodge City Legend				
2005	(United States) Ken Charles	Brooklyn Kings				
2006	(United States) Bryan Gates	Oklahoma Storm				
2007	(United States) Dale Osbourne (2)	Dodge City Legend				

=== Defensive Player of the Year ===
Year	Player	Team	Reference
2002	(United States) Johnny Jackson	Kansas Cagerz	
2003	(United States) Kevin Freeman	Westchester Wildfire	
2004	(United States) Immanuel McElroy	Dodge City Legend	
2005	(United States) Eric Coley	Oklahoma Storm	
2006	(United States) Anthony Johnson	Kansas Cagerz	
2007	(United States) Ronald Ross	Albany Patroons	

=== Man of the Year ===
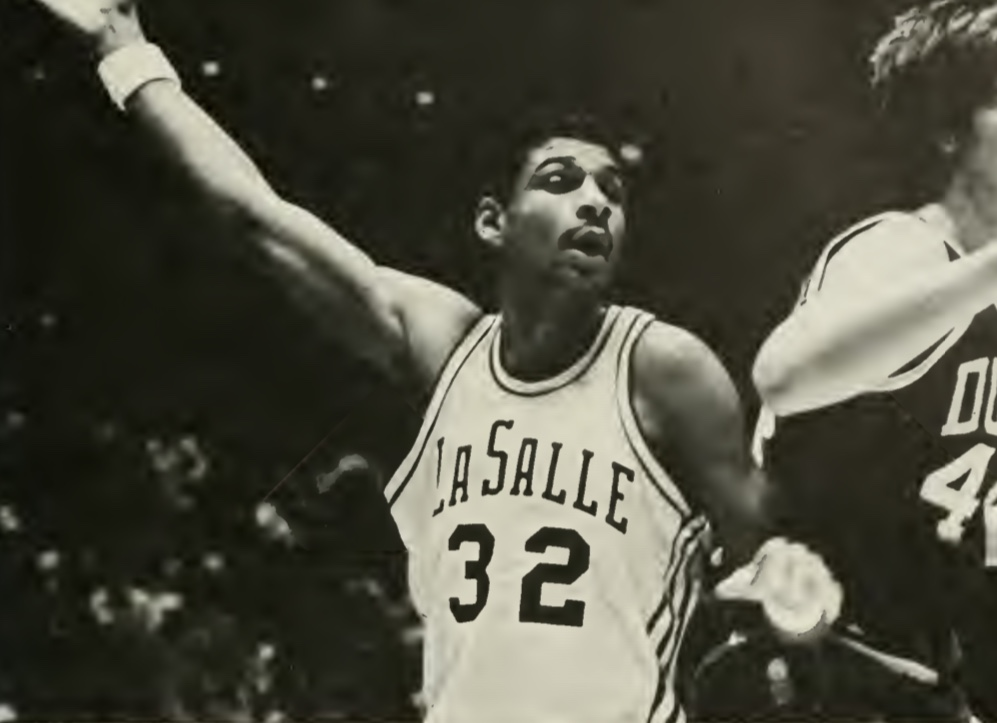
Michael Brooks was voted the Man of the Year in 1988.

Year	Player	Team
1986	(United States) Jim Bostic	Westchester Golden Apples
1987	(United States) World B. Free	Miami Tropics
1988	(United States) Michael Brooks	Philadelphia Aces
1992	(United States) John Lucas II	Miami Tropics
1993	(United States) Al Outlaw	Atlanta Eagles
1996	(United States) Roy Jones Jr.	Jacksonville Barracudas

== Statistical leaders ==
=== Scoring leaders ===
Season	Player	Pos	Team	Points per game
1985	(United States) John "Hot Rod" Williams	C	Rhode Island Gulls	23.1
1986	(United States) Don Collins	F/G	Tampa Bay Stars	31.8
1987	(United States) Don Collins (2)	F/G	Tampa Bay Stars	31.0
1988	(United States) Richard Rellford	F	Palm Beach Stingrays	31.4
1990	(United States) Lewis Lloyd	G/F	New Haven Skyhawks	26.8
1991	(United States) Norris Coleman	F	Jacksonville Hooters	29.3
1992	(United States) Roy Tarpley	C	Miami Tropics	32.2
1993	(United States) Ken Bannister	F/C	Miami Tropics	30.2
1994	(United States) Mark Brisker	G	Jacksonville Hooters	26.9
1995	(United States) Jerry Reynolds	G/F	Atlanta Trojans	26.3
1996	(United States) Brent Scott	C	Portland Mountain Cats	29.8
1997	(United States) Dennis Edwards	F	Florida Sharks	32.8
1998	(United States) Ochiel Swaby	F	Tampa Bay Windjammers	26.2
1999	(United States) Mike Lloyd	G	Atlantic City Seagulls	27.3
2000	(United States) Sean Colson	G	Dodge City Legend	28.2
2001	(United States) Jermaine Walker	C	Lakeland Blue Ducks	27.5
2002	(United States) Jason Lampa	G	Brooklyn Kings	25.9
2003	(United States) Lenny Cooke	G	Brooklyn Kings	28.8
2004	(United States) Jason Lampa (2)	G	Brooklyn Kings	26.7
2005	(United States) Kareem Reid	G	Pennsylvania ValleyDawgs	27.4
2006	(United States) Brian Chase	G	Nebraska Cranes	19.9
2007	(United States) Anthony Richardson	F	Kansas Cagerz	20.0

=== Rebounding leaders ===
Season	Player	Pos	Team	Rebounds per game
1985	(Sudan) Manute Bol	C	Rhode Island Gulls	14.2
1986	(United States) Jim Bostic	F	Westchester Golden Apples	10.1
1987	(United States) Hank McDowell	F/C	Rhode Island Gulls	10.7
1988	(United States) (France) Michael Brooks	F	Philadelphia Aces	13.5
1990	(United States) Alex Roberts	F	New York Whitecaps	15.3
1991	(United States) Anthony Mason	F	Long Island Surf	11.2
1992	(United States) Roy Tarpley	C	Miami Tropics	17.0
1993	(United States) Fred Lewis	F	Daytona Beach Hooters	9.3
1994	(United States) Keith Lee	F/C	Memphis Fire	14.5
1995	(United States) Brent Scott	C	Miami Tropics	12.0
1996	(United States) Shawnelle Scott	C	Long Island Surf	13.5
1997	(United States) Brent Scott (2)	C	Atlantic City Seagulls	11.4
1998	(United States) Andre Perry	F	Atlanta Trojans	11.0
1999	(United States) Andre Perry	F	Atlanta Trojans	11.6
2000	(United States) Andre Perry (3)	F	Florida Sea Dragons	11.4
2001	(United States) John Jackson	F	Kansas Cagerz	12.0
2002	(United States) John Jackson (2)	F	Kansas Cagerz	11.7
2003	(United States) Antonio Smith	C	Dodge City Legend	11.3
2004	(United States) Mario Woodson	F	Florence Flyers	10.5
2005	(United States) Roderick Riley	C	Pennsylvania ValleyDawgs	10.2
2006	(United States) Steve Castleberry	F	Northeast Pennsylvania Breakers	10.7
2007	(United States) Jason Miller	F/C	Kansas Cagerz	8.0

=== Assists leaders ===
Season	Player	Pos	Team	Assists per game
1985	(United States) Sam Worthen	G	Springfield Fame	8.5
1986	(United States) Leroy Witherspoon	G	Tampa Bay Flash	15.1
1987	(United States) Leroy Witherspoon (2)	G	Tampa Bay Flash	9.6
1988	(United States) Duane Washington	G	New Haven Skyhawks	8.3
1990	(United States) Jerry Johnson	G	Jacksonville Hooters	8.8
1991	(United States) Michael Anderson	G	Philadelphia Aces	10.3
1992	(United States) Tony Smith	G	New Jersey Jammers	9.2
1993	(United States) David Cain	G	Long Island Surf	9.4
1994	(United States) Jean Prioleau	G	Long Island Surf	10.3
1995	(United States) Charles Smith	G	Florida Sharks	11.9
1996	(United States) Charles Smith (2)	G	Florida Sharks	11.4
1997	(United States) Mark Baker	G	Atlantic City Seagulls	7.2
1998	(United States) Curt Smith	G	Washington Congressionals	7.4
1999	(United States) James Blackwell	G	Tampa Bay Windjammers	7.4
2000	(United States) Sean Colson	G	Dodge City Legend	8.0
2001	(United States) Jermaine Jackson	G	Kansas Cagerz	9.6
2002	(United States) Duane Simpkins	G	Kansas Cagerz	6.2
2003	(United States) Kareem Reid	G	Pennsylvania ValleyDawgs	9.6
2004	(United States) Tyson Patterson	G	Florence Flyers	8.4
2005	(United States) Kareem Reid	G	Pennsylvania ValleyDawgs	8.9
2006	(United States) Tory Cavalieri	G	Northeast Pennsylvania Breakers	8.1
2007	(United States) Kareem Reid (3)	G	Albany Patroons	6.4

== All-time records ==
=== Scoring leaders ===
- Norris Coleman, a four-time USBL All Star, was the USBL All-time leading Scorer with 3,104 points until 2001. He became the all-time scorer with the conclusion of the 1994 USBL season with 2,949 points.
- On June 6, 2001, Kwan Johnson who was only 13 pts short, broke his all-time record in the game Westchester Wildfire - Pennsylvania ValleyDawgs.
- By June 21, 2005, Kwan Johnson was the USBL's All-Time (1985-2009) leading scorer overall with 3,453 points. Herman Alston is 3d on the list with 2,639 pts. Other leading scorers: Ron Matthias scored 2,293 points and he is 6th of all-time, Ken Bannister with 2,052 points is ninth (in 99 games) and Michael Lloyd is 10th with 2,031 points)
- By June 21, 2005, Don Collins had the highest scoring average (31.4 pg), of any player scored over 1,000 pts in USBL's history.
- By June 21, 2005, John Strickland was the All-Time leader in playoff points with 213. Michael Lloyd is second on the list as he has recorded 206 career playoff points.

All-time scorers

Rank	Player	Points	Years Active
1	(United States) Kwan Johnson	3,453	1999–2005
2	(United States) Norris Coleman	3,104	1988–1993
3	(United States) Herman Alston	2,639	

=== Games leaders ===
- Norris Coleman became the all-time scorrecordman in total games played with the conclusion of the 1994 USBL season with 111 points.
- On June 6, 2001, Kwan Johnson became the All -time leader in games played with 145 breaking Norris Coleman record of 144.
- By June 21, 2005, Kwan Johnson was the overall recordman in games played with 177 (in 8 seasons). Herman Alston had 144 games (in 7 seasons)
- Roy Tarpley who played 16 games for the Miami Tropics in 1992, holds the record for the longest time span between seasons played (13) as he played for the Dodge City Legends in 2005.

=== Steals leaders ===
- By June 6, 2001, Kwan Johnson was also the All-time leader in steals with 279.
- By June 21, 2005, Johnson was overall the USBL's All-Time recordman with 316 steals. Darrell Armstrong was all-time third in steals with 259.

=== Assists leaders ===
- By June 21, 2005, Charles Smith had 549 assists (in 46 games). Darrell Armstrong was 10th in assists with 491.

=== Rebounds leaders ===
- By June 21, 2005, Johnny Jackson was the all-time leader in rebounds with 1,311. Andre Perry was third with 1,179.
- Norris Coleman became the top rebounder with the conclusion of the 1994 USBL season with 891 rebounds.
- Manute Bol (in 1985) and Anthony Mason (in 1991) hold the record for the most rebounds in a game with 28.

All-time rebounders

Rank	Player	Rebounds	RPG	Years Active
1	(United States) Johnny Jackson	1,311	11.2	2001–2005
2	(United States) Andre Perry	1,179	11.0	1998–2002

=== Free throws leaders ===
- By June 6, 2001, Kwan Johnson was also the All -Time Leader in free throws scoring 803 (out of 1,132).
- By June 21, 2005, Johnson remained on top with 905 (out of 1,286).

=== Top scorers in a single game ===
Byron Strickland holds the record for most points scored in a single game.

- 65 pts. Byron Strickland, Jersey Jammers vs Springfield Fame, 8/18/1986
- 63 pts. Don Collins, Tampa Bay Flash vs Jersey Jammers, 8/9/1986
- 55 pts. Norris Coleman, Jacksonville Hooters vs Philadelphia Aces, 6/13/1988
- 54 pts. Martin Clark, Rhode Island Gulls vs Long Island Knights, 7/10/1985
- 54 pts. Steve Gilbert, Jacksonville Shooters vs Memphis Fire, 6/28/1995
- 53 pts. Lenny Cooke, Brooklyn Kings vs Adirondack Wildcats, 6/22/2003
- 51 pts. Stewart Granger, Wildwood Aces vs Jersey Jammers, 7/16/1986
- 51 pts. Lewis Lloyd, Philadelphia Spirit vs Palm Beach Stingrays, 7/22/1988
- 51 pts. Adrian Griffin, Atlantic City Seagulls vs Pennsylvania Valleydawgs, 5/22/1999
- 50 pts. Martin Clark, Rhode Island Gulls vs Long Island Knights, 7/10/1985
- 49 pts. Cedric Henderson, Jacksonville Hooters 155-127 at Long Island Knights, at SUNY-Stony Brook, 6/20/1988
- 49 pts. Dennis Edwards, Florida Sharks vs Jacksonville Barracudas, 6/8/1997
- 49 pts. Mike Lloyd, Atlantic City Seagulls vs Washington Congressionals, 5/20/1999
- 49 pts. Devin Brown, Kansas Cagerz vs Adirondack Wildcats, 6/28/2002 USBL Tournament Semi-Finals at Enid, Okla.
- 49 pts. Bingo Merriex, Texas Rim Rockers vs Oklahoma Storm, 5/16/2003
- 48 pts. Mark Davis, Long Island Knights vs Staten Island Stallions, 7/17/1987
- 48 pts. Ken Bannister, Miami Tropics vs Long Island Surf, 6/12/1993
- 47 pts. Roy Tarpley, Miami Tropics vs Jacksonville Hooters, 7/21/1992 (24 reb.)
- 47 pts. Mark Brisker, Daytona Beach Hooters vs Connecticut Skyhawks, 6/29/1993
- 47 pts. Duane Simpkins, Kansas Cagerz vs Adirondack Wildcats, 6/28/2002 USBL Tournament Semi-Finals at Mark Price Arena, Enid, Oklahoma
- 47 pts. Lenny Cooke, Brooklyn Kings vs Brevard Blue Ducks, 6/17/2003 at L.I.U. Schwartz Center

== All Star Game ==
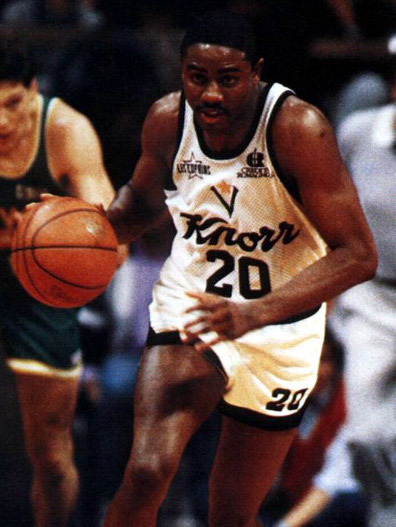
Micheal Sugar Ray Richardson was selected for the USBL All-Stars in the 1987 edition.

The first edition was held in 1985 at Springfield Civic Center in front of 5,093 fans. Springfield Fame beat the USBL All-Stars, 87-75, in league's inaugural all-star game in 1985. Michael Adams with 18 points and 7 steals was the MVP. The 1985 All-Star team featured Manute Bol, Spud Webb, and John "Hot Rod" Williams among others.

The 1986 All-Star Game also took place at the Springfield Civic Center on July 25, 1986. In the 1987 edition Rhode Island Gulls hosted the event and defeated the USBL All-Stars by 119-112. Muggsy Bogues who had just been selected 12th in the 1987 NBA Draft was the MVP. The 4th edition was hosted at Philadelphia Civic Center on June 25, 1988 and it was broadcast live at 2 pm by FNN.

The 6th All Star Game was played on June 29, in 1991 at Glens Falls, New York. Paul Graham led the All-Stars to a 132-126 victory over the Empire State Stallions and was named the MVP. Also future NBA players like Greg Sutton and Keith "Mister" Jennings played in the 1991 edition. In total five members of the 1991 All Star Game had NBA experience: Earl Cureton, Antony Mason, Norris Coleman, Wes Matthews and Michael Anderson. The 2000 All-Star Game was held on 2 July 2000.

The league also had a USBL All-Star Travel Team. In 1991 they won the silver medal in the Winston world basketball cup (July 26–28, San Juan, Puerto Rico) under coach Rex Morgan, competeding against 6 national teams (Soviet Union, Brazil, Puerto Rico, Canada, Mexico, Cuba) and KK POP 84. The USBL All-Stars lost to Puerto Rico in the final in front of 12,000 fans.

The USBL All-Stars also played at the 1992 Puerto Rico invitational tournament (June 17–22).

=== Notable USBL All-Stars ===
- (United States) Sugar Ray Richardson (1987)
- (United States) Norris Coleman (1987, 1988, 1991, 1992)
- (United States) Chuck Nevitt (1991)
- (United States) Antony Mason (1991)
- (United States) Richard Rellford (1987)
- (United States) Mitchell Wiggins (1987)
- (United States) (France) Michael Brooks (1987)
- (United States) (Republic of Ireland) Dan Trant (1985)
- (Canada) Ron Crevier (1985)
- (Canada) Stewart Granger (1987)
- (United States) (France) Larry Lawrence (1985)
- (United States) John "Hot Rod" Williams (1985)
- (Sudan) (United States) Manute Bol (1985)
- (United States) Roy Tarpley (1992)
- (United States) Muggsy Bogues (1987)
- (United States) Don Collins (1987)
- (United States) Eddie Lee Wilkins (1987)
- (United States) World B. Free (1987)

== Anniversary teams ==
=== 15th anniversary team ===
In 2001 the USBL asked its fans to vote online for a USBL "All-15 Team", to celebrate the league's 15th anniversary. The USBL finally presented 19 players.

==== Players ====
An alphabetical listing of 19 voted players is as follows:

- (United States) Michael Adams - guard
- (United States) Herman Alston - guard
- (United States) Michael Anderson - guard
- (United States) Darrell Armstrong - guard
- (United States) Tyrone Bogues - guard
- (Sudan) Manute Bol - center
- (United States) Lloyd Daniels - forward
- (United States) Richard Dumas - forward
- (United States) Dennis Edwards - forward
- (United States) Adrian Griffin - guard
- (United States) Avery Johnson - guard
- (United States) Fred Lewis - forward
- (United States) Michael Lloyd - guard
- (United States) Anthony Mason - forward
- (United States) Charles Smith - guard
- (United States) John Strickland - forward
- (United States) Roy Tarpley - center
- (United States) Jermaine Walker - center
- (United States) John "Hot Rod" Williams - center

=== 20th anniversary team ===
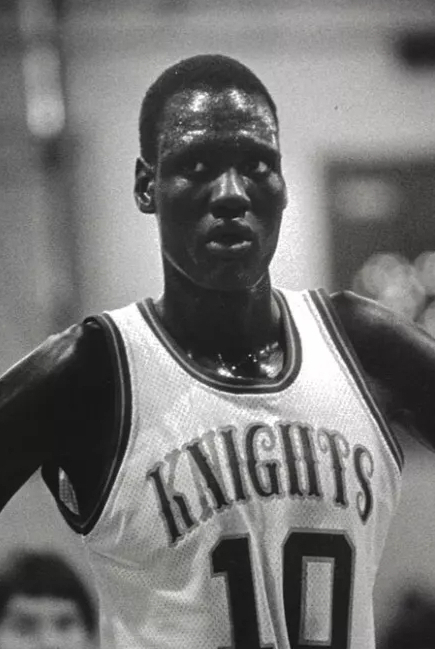
Manute Bol made both the anniversary teams.

On 21 July 2005, the league announced the players of its "Top 20 and Beyond Anniversary Team" were chosen by a vote of executives, coaches, and administrators that had served over the years in the USBL.

==== Players ====
An alphabetical listing of 20 voted players is as follows:

- (United States) Michael Adams - guard
- (United States) Herman Alston - guard
- (United States) Darrell Armstrong - guard
- (United States) Ken Bannister - forward
- (United States) Tyrone Bogues - guard
- (Sudan) Manute Bol - center
- (United States) Don Collins - forward
- (United States) Adrian Griffin - guard
- (United States) Johnny Jackson - forward
- (United States) Avery Johnson - guard
- (United States) Kwan Johnson - guard
- (United States) Jason Lampa - guard
- (United States) Michael Lloyd - guard
- (United States) Anthony Mason - forward
- (United States) Andre Perry - forward
- (United States) Brent Scott - forward
- (United States) Charles Smith - guard
- (United States) John Strickland - forward
- (United States) Roy Tarpley - center
- (United States) John "Hot Rod" Williams - center

Honorable mention by USBL (2005):

- (United States) Chris Childs - Spent two years with the Miami Tropics and then a long NBA career.
- (United States) Norris Coleman - Second All-Time leading scorer in the USBL.
- (United States) Lloyd Daniels - "Sweet Pea" first showed the world his talents in the USBL.
- (United States) Richard Dumas - Proved that his troubles were behind him with the 1992 Miami Tropics.
- (United States) Dennis Edwards - The 1998 Player of the Year.
- (United States) Mario Elie - A short stint in 1987 was parlayed into a 12 year NBA career.
- (United States) Darrin Hancock - Is one of only two players with 3 USBL Championship Rings.
- (United States) Damon Jones - The Miami Heat guard played on a talented 1998 Jacksonville squad.
- (United States) Tim Legler - The ESPN analyst played 4 great seasons with the Philadelphia franchise.
- (United States) Sam Mitchell - Toronto Raptors Head Coach played two season in Westchester in 1985-85.
- (United States) Kareem Reid - Known as "The Best Kept Secret".
- (United States) Lazarus Sims - Known as "Z".
- (United States) Curt Smith - The 1998 Player of the Year.
- (United States) Jermaine Walker - A scoring force for 5 seasons for Rex Morgan's coached teams.
- (United States) Spud Webb - Set the stage for Arkansas Little men becoming a force in the NBA.

==== Coaches ====
- (United States) Kareem Abdul-Jabbar
- (Trinidad and Tobago) Ken Charles
- (United States) Darryl Dawkins
- (United States) Francis Flax
- (United States) Gordon Gibbons
- (United States) Ray Hodge
- (United States) Cliff Levingston
- (United States) John Lucas
- (United States) Rex Morgan
- (United States) Eric Musselman
- (United States) Gerald Oliver

== Notable past players ==
=== Players by country ===
USA

- Michael Adams (Springfield Fame)
- Michael Anderson (Philadelphia Aces, Philadelphia Spirit)
- Darrell Armstrong (Atlanta Trojans)
- Raja Bell (Tampa Bay Windjammers)
- Henry Bibby (Springfield Fame)
- Mark Blount (Atlantic City Seagulls, New Jersey Shorecats)
- Tyrone "Muggsy" Bogues (Rhode Island Gulls)
- Devin Brown (Kansas Cagerz)
- Chris Childs (Miami Tropics)
- Lloyd Daniels (Miami Tropics)
- Mark Davis (Long Island Knights)
- Waliyy Dixon (Atlantic City Seagulls)
- Richard Dumas (Miami Tropics)
- Mario Elie (Miami Tropics)
- LeRon Ellis (Connecticut Skyhawks)
- World B. Free (Miami Tropics)
- Doug Gottlieb (Oklahoma Storm)
- Darrin Hancock (New Jersey Shore Cats, Dodge City Legend, Pennsylvania ValleyDawgs, Kansas Cagerz)
- Antonio Harvey (Atlanta Eagles)
- Vince Hizon (Pennsylvania Valleydawgs)
- Craig Hodges (Washington Congressionals)
- Anderson Hunt (Miami Tropics)
- Mike James (Long Island Surf)
- Keith Jennings (Jacksonville Hooters)
- Avery Johnson (Palm Beach Stingrays)
- Anthony Jones (Palm Beach Stingrays)
- Roy Jones Jr. (Brevard Blue Ducks)
- Eddie Jordan (Jersey Jammers)
- R. Kelly (Atlantic City Seagulls)
- Shawn Kemp Oklahoma Storm
- Rusty LaRue (Carolina Cardinals)
- Nancy Lieberman (Springfield Fame)
- Anthony Mason (Long Island Surf)
- Cheryl Miller (Staten Island Stallions)
- Jamario Moon (Dodge City Legend, Gary Steelheads)
- Moochie Norris (Washington Congressionals)
- Kevin Ollie (Connecticut Skyhawks)
- Terrell Owens (Adirondack Wildcats)
- Victor Page (Washington Congressionals)
- Simeon Rice (Philadelphia Power)
- Lynette Richardson (Miami Tropics)
- Micheal "Sugar" Ray Richardson (Long Island Knights)
- Cliff Robinson (Miami Tropics)
- LaMont "ShowBoat" Robinson (Long Island Knights)
- Jim Rowinski (Long Island Surf)
- Shawnelle Scott (Long Island Surf)
- Charles Smith (Florida Sharks)
- Curt Smith (Washington Congressionals)
- Mark Strickland (Philadelphia Spirit, Atlanta Trojans, Atlantic City Seagulls)
- Derek Strong (Miami Tropics)
- Roy Tarpley (Miami Tropics)
- Ime Udoka (Adirondack Wildcats)
- Kelvin Upshaw (Palmbeach Stingrays)
- Chris Washburn (Miami Tropics, Westchester Stallions)
- Anthony "Spud" Webb (Rhode Island Gulls)
- Freeman Williams (Miami Tropics)
- John "Hot Rod" Williams (Rhode Island Gulls)
- Lorenzo Williams (Palmbeach Stingrays)

Rest of the world

- Bong Alvarez (Pennsylvania ValleyDawgs)
- Robert Archibald (Jersey Shore Bucs)
- Manute Bol (Rhode Island Gulls)
- Yinka Dare (New Jersey Shorecats)
- Marcelo Nicola (Long Island Surf)

=== International players ===
National team	Player	Period	Appearances	Notes
(United States) USA	Michael Brooks	1979	9	
(United States) USA	Thomas Hill	1991	6	
(United States) USA	Carl Thomas	1995-99	12	
(United States) USA	Jimmy King	1998	9	World Cup 1998
(United States) USA	Gerard King	1998	9	
(United States) USA	Muggsy Bogues	1986	10	
(United States) USA	Mitchell Wiggins	1982	9	World Cup 1982
(United States) USA	Mikki Moore	1999	5	
(United States) USA	Travis Williams	1997-99	14	
(United States) USA	Kermit Holmes	1997-99	14	
(United States) USA	James Martin	1999	4	
(United States) USA	Todd Lindeman	1999	5	
(United States) USA	Larry Lewis	1995	6	
(United States) USA	A.J. Wynder	1995	6	
(United States) USA	Kelsey Weems	1993-95		
(United States) USA	Craig Neal	1993		AmeriCup 1993
(United States) USA	Eldridge Recasner	1993		AmeriCup 1993
(United States) USA	Harold Ellis	1993		AmeriCup 1993
(United States) USA	Jerry Holman	2001		AmeriCup 2001
(United States) USA	Charles Smith	1988	8	
(United States) USA	Chris Jent	1993		AmeriCup 1993
(United States) USA	Adrian Griffin	1997	6	
(United States) USA	Rusty LaRue	1997	9	
(United States) USA	Kenny Brown	2001		AmeriCup 2001

== Hall of Famers ==
=== Basketball Hall of Fame ===
- (United States) Kareem Abdul-Jabbar, Oklahoma Storm coach
- (United States) Nate Archibald, New Jersey Jammers coach, Jersey Shore Bucs player
- (United States) Walt Frazier, Staten Island Stallions owner
- (United States) Earl Monroe, USBL commissioner 1985

=== Collegiate Basketball Hall of Fame ===
- (United States) Kareem Abdul-Jabbar, Oklahoma Storm coach
- (United States) Nate Archibald, New Jersey Jammers coach, Jersey Shore Bucs player
- (United States) Earl Monroe, USBL commissioner 1985
- (United States) Robert Parish, Maryland Mustangs coach

=== NYC Basketball Hall of Fame ===
- (United States) Kareem Abdul-Jabbar, Oklahoma Storm coach
- (United States) World B. Free, Miami Tropics player

== See also ==
- All-USBL Team
- List of developmental and minor sports leagues

== Sources ==
- USBL 1985-1991
