= Treasure Coast Tropics =

- League: USBL
- Founded: 1987
- Dissolved: 1996
- History: Miami Tropics; 1987-1988, 1991-1995; Treasure Coast Tropics; 1996
- Location: Port St. Lucie, Florida
- Team colors: blue, red, white
- Championships: 3 USBL (1991, 1992, 1993)
- Conference titles: 1991, 1992

The Treasure Coast Tropics, originally known as the Miami Tropics, was a professional basketball club in the United States Basketball League (USBL) from 1987 to 1996.

== History ==
The team was originally based in Miami. The team debuted in 1987 as the Miami Tropics, winning the USBL title by defeating the Rhode Island Gulls 103–99 in the final. After a two-year hiatus, the club resumed operations in 1991, reaching the championship three years in a row. In 1991, they lost 110–108 to the Philadelphia Spirit. In August 1991, the club was bought by John Lucas.

Back-to-back titles followed in 1992 (116–114 to the Philadelphia Spirit) and 1993 (139–127 to the Westchester Stallions).

For the 1996 season, they moved to Port St. Lucie, Florida, changing their name to the Treasure Coast Tropics. The Tropics disbanded at the end of the season.

Notable players like former NBAers, Richard Dumas, Chuck Nevitt, Mario Elie, Roy Tarpley and World B. Free played for the franchise.

A new franchise under the name Miami Tropics was founded in 2006 and it joined the ABA.

== Seasons ==
Stagione	League	Name	W	L	%	Place	Play-off	Coach
1987	USBL	Miami Tropics	18	12	60,0	2º	Champions	Sam Worthen
1988	USBL	Miami Tropics	13	17	43,3	6º	did not qualify	George Whittaker
1991	USBL	Miami Tropics	13	7	65,0	1º	Final	Eric Dennis; Kevin Mackey
1992	USBL	Miami Tropics	22	4	84,6	1º	Champions	John Lucas II
1993	USBL	Miami Tropics	14	10	58,3	3º	Champions	John Lucas II
1994	USBL	Miami Tropics	18	9	66,7	2º	Semifinals	Dirk Minniefield
1995	USBL	Miami Tropics	8	18	30,8	7º	-	Kevin Mackey
1996	USBL	Treasure coast Tropics	8	18	30,8	5º	-	Ken Bannister

== Notable players ==
Note: Flags indicate national team eligibility at FIBA-sanctioned events. Players may hold other non-FIBA nationalities not displayed.

Criteria

To appear in this section a player must have either:

- Set a club record or won an individual award while at the club
- Played at least one official international match for their national team at any time
- Played at least one official NBA match at any time.

- (United States) Ken Bannister
- (United States) World B. Free
- (United States) (Republic of Ireland) Ron Rowan
- (United States) Chuck Nevitt
- (United States) Richard Dumas
- (United States) Mario Elie
- (United States) Roy Tarpley
- (United States) Clinton Wheeler
- (United States) Lloyd Daniels
- (United States) Shelton Jones
- (United Kingdom) Steve Bucknall
- (United States) Jim Rowinski
- (United States) Derreck Hamilton
- (United States) Gerard King

== Home arenas ==
Miami Tropics

- Gibson Center at Miami Dade South Community College (Miami, Florida) 1991
- Golden Panther Arena - Florida International University (Westchester, Florida) 1992–93
- Gibson Center at Miami Dade South Community College (Miami, Florida) 1994

Treasure Coast Tropics

- Miami Dade Kendall (Kendall, Florida) 1996

== Rosters ==
=== 1991 season ===
- Steve Bucknall, Lloyd Daniels, Ron Matthias, Chris Harris, Chuck Nevitt, Lorenzo Williams, Derek Strong, Shelton Jones, Ricky Jones, Ken McFadden, Sean Gay.

=== 1992 season ===
- Richard Dumas, Ken Bannister, Treg Lee, Sheldon Owens, David Robinson, Dana Hardy, Roy Tarpley, Jerome Scott, Grant Gondrezick, Gerald Williams.

=== 1993 season ===
- Ken Bannister, Luther Burks, Cliff Robinson, Johnny McDowell, Grant Gondrezick, Dwight Stewart, Anthony Lawrence, Ricky Calloway, Chris Childs, Freeman Williams, Duane Washington.

== See also ==
- Miami Majesty
