= Atlanta Trojans =

- League: USBL
- Founded: 1991
- Dissolved: 1999
- History: Atlanta Eagles; 1991-1993; Atlanta Trojans; 1994-1999
- Location: Suwanee, Georgia
- Team colors: black, yellow

The Atlanta Trojans, originally known as the Atlanta Eagles, was a professional basketball club in the United States Basketball League (USBL) from 1991 to 1999.

== History ==
The team was originally based in Atlanta, Georgia. They debuted in 1991 as the Atlanta Eagles in Atlanta.

In 1994, they moved to Suwanee, Georgia, changing their name to the Atlanta Trojans. They reached the USBL Finals twice: in 1994 (losing 117–109 to the Jacksonville Hooters) and 1995 (losing 109–104 to the Florida Sharks). The club disbanded after the 1999 season.

Notable players like Darrell Armstrong, Mikki Moore, Kareem Reid, Lorenzo Coleman, Tony Dorsey and Mark Strickland played for the franchise.

== Seasons ==
| Stagione | League | Name | W | L | % | Place | Play-off | Coach |
|---|---|---|---|---|---|---|---|---|
| 1991 | USBL | Atlanta Eagles | 10 | 10 | 50,0 | 3º | - | Charlie Criss |
| 1992 | USBL | Atlanta Eagles | 16 | 10 | 61,5 | 2º | Division Finals | Al Outlaw |
| 1993 | USBL | Atlanta Eagles | 14 | 10 | 58,3 | 2º | Semifinals | Al Outlaw |
| 1994 | USBL | Atlanta Trojans | 19 | 10 | 65,5 | 3º | Finals | Al Outlaw |
| 1995 | USBL | Atlanta Trojans | 19 | 9 | 67,9 | 3º | Finals | Al Outlaw |
| 1996 | USBL | Atlanta Trojans | 8 | 19 | 29,6 | 4º | Quarter finals | Al Outlaw |
| 1997 | USBL | Atlanta Trojans | 18 | 8 | 69,2 | 1º | Semifinals | James Waldron |
| 1998 | USBL | Atlanta Trojans | 9 | 17 | 34,6 | 3º | Second round | James Waldron |
| 1999 | USBL | Atlanta Trojans | 18 | 10 | 64,3 | 2º | Quarter finals | Curtis Berry |

== Notable players ==
Note: Flags indicate national team eligibility at FIBA-sanctioned events. Players may hold other non-FIBA nationalities not displayed.

Criteria

To appear in this section a player must have either:

- Set a club record or won an individual award while at the club
- Played at least one official international match for their national team at any time
- Played at least one official NBA match at any time.

- (United States) Darrell Armstrong
- (United States) World B. Free
- (United States) (Spain) Mike Smith
- (United States) Tony Dorsey
- (United States) Mark Strickland
- (United States) Antonio Harvey
- (United States) Harold Ellis
- (United States) Lanard Copeland
- (United States) Mikki Moore
- (United States) Kannard Johnson
- (United States) Kareem Reid
- (United States) Lorenzo Coleman
- (United States) Demetrius Alexander

== Home arenas ==
Atlanta Eagles

- Life College Sport Science Center (Marietta, Georgia) 1991–93

Atlanta Trojans

- Tri-Cities Arena, 1994–95
- Banneker High School Arena (Atlanta, Georgia) 1996
- Patriots Gym, DeKalb College (Decatur, Georgia) 1997
- Suwanee Sports Academy (1,000) (Suwanee, Georgia), 1998–99

== Rosters ==
=== 1991 season ===
- Lanard Copeland, James Martin, Billy Kurisko, Chris Collier, Ernest Hall, James Scott, World B. Free, Stephen Bardo, Wes Matthews, Michael Smith, James Munlyn, Darryl Pinckney.

=== 1992 season ===
- Darrell Armstrong, Chris Collier, James Martin, Mike Brittain, Antwon Harmon, Scott Bailey, Reggie Tinch, Larry Lewis, Harold Ellis, Marcus Webb.

=== 1993 season ===
- Darrell Armstrong, Mark Strickland, Antonio Harvey, Derrick Dennison, Vernel Singleton, Stan Rose, Josh Oppenheimer, Tony Smith, Harold Ellis, Bernard Williams, Tony Dorsey, Darryl Pinckney.

=== 1994 season ===
- Darrell Armstrong, Mark Strickland, Tony Dorsey, James Martin, Chuck Evans, Stan Rose, Ivano Newbill, Robert Shannon, Clarence Thrash, Fred Vinson.

== See also ==
- Atlanta Vision
