= Westchester Golden Apples =

- League: USBL
- Founded: 1985
- Dissolved: 1986
- Arena: Westchester County Center (1985); John A. Mulcahy Campus Events Center (1986)
- Location: White Plains, New York (1985); New Rochelle, New York (1986)
- Team colors: blue, yellow

The Westchester Golden Apples was a professional basketball team based in the United States Basketball League (USBL). The team was a charter member of the USBL in 1985.

The team was originally owned by former New York Knicks player Dick Barnett and an unnamed partner, but they failed to meet their financial obligation to the league and New Jerseyite Ed Rohan stepped in and purchased the Golden Apples.

In 1985, the team played home games at the Westchester County Center in White Plains, New York, finishing in a fifth-place tie in the seven-team loop with a 9-15 record. Jim Bostic played for the Golden Apples and was named to the inaugural USBL All-Defensive Team.

The following season, the Golden Apples moved to the John A. Mulcahy Campus Events Center on the campus on Iona College in New Rochelle, New York; things did not improve on the court, as the club sank to last place with a 5-18 mark. One notable player on the Apples was Leroy Smith, childhood friend and teammate of Michael Jordan; also, Nancy Lieberman made her USBL debut as a member of the Springfield Fame against the Golden Apples in June, making her the first woman to play in a men's professional basketball league. The club folded at the end of the season.
