= Portland Wave =

- League: USBL
- Founded: 1996
- Dissolved: 1997
- History: Portland Mountain Cats (1996); Portland Wave (1997)
- Arena: Cumberland County Civic Center (1996) University of Southern Maine Sullivan Gym (1997)
- Location: Portland, Maine
- President: Mark McClure (1996); Bill Beyer (1997)

The Portland Wave, originally known as the Portland Mountain Cats, was a professional basketball team in the United States Basketball League (USBL) from 1996 to 1997.

== History ==
The team was based in Portland, Maine and played home games at Cumberland County Civic Center. Jeff O'Sullivan, Guy Nadeau and Ted Goldsmith were the team's board of directors. In 1996, Mark McClure served as the team's president. He was replaced in 1997 by Bill Beyer, who also took ownership of the team. In 1997, Rick Simonds served as Head Coach, with Jim Graham as Assistant Coach, and Chris Gardner as Team Assistant.

== Seasons ==
Stagione	League	Name	W	L	%	Place	Play-off	Coach
1996	USBL	Portland Mountain Cats	18	11	62.1	2nd	Semifinals	Kevin Mackey
1997	USBL	Portland Wave	12	14	46.2	4th	-	Rick Simonds

== Home arenas ==
Portland Mountain Cats

- Cumberland County Civic Center, cap: 6,200 (Portland, Maine) 1996

Portland Wave

- University of Southern Maine Sullivan Gym, (Portland, Maine) 1997

== Rosters ==
=== 1996 season ===
Ron Matthias, Jay Webb, John Wassenberger, Reggie Townsend, Brent Scott, Malcolm Huckaby, Ron Huery, Sean Green, Charles Thomas, Ron Lacey, (Nigeria) Dozie Mbonu.

=== 1997 season ===
Jay Webb, John Wassenberger, Myron Brown, Charles Macon, Andre Foreman, Dan Cross, Scott Coleman, Johnny Tyson, Roderick Anderson, Al Hamilton.
