= Ron Crevier =

Canadian basketball player

Personal information
- Born: April 14, 1958 (age 68) Montreal, Quebec, Canada
- Listed height: 7 ft 0 in (2.13 m)
- Listed weight: 235 lb (107 kg)

Career information
- High school: Dawson (Montreal, Quebec)
- College: Boston College (1978–1983)
- NBA draft: 1983: 4th round, 75th overall pick
- Drafted by: Chicago Bulls
- Playing career: 1983–1987
- Position: Center
- Number: 40, 42

Career history
- 1983–1984: Toronto Tornados
- 1985: Springfield Fame
- 1985: Golden State Warriors
- 1985: Detroit Pistons
- 1986–1987: Pamesa Valencia
- Stats at NBA.com
- Stats at Basketball Reference

Ronald Joseph Oscar Camille Crevier (KREV-ee-AY; born April 14, 1958) is a Canadian former professional basketball player. He played part of one season in the National Basketball Association (NBA) and in the early 1980s for the Canadian national men's basketball team.

Born in Montreal, Quebec, Crevier played for Dawson College CEGEP before enrolling at Boston College, where during his four years he came off the bench for the Eagles. Despite his limited playing time the 7-foot Crevier was drafted by the Chicago Bulls in the fourth round (75th pick overall) in the 1983 draft. He did not make team however and played instead in the Continental Basketball Association for the Toronto Tornados, along with fellow Canadian Jim Zoet.

Crevier began the 1985–86 season playing for the Springfield Fame of the United States Basketball League, and posted the third most blocked shots in the league with 1.6 per game. He joined the Golden State Warriors in mid-season and saw a minute of action in one game. He later joined the Detroit Pistons, playing three minutes over two games. Crevier then played the 1986–87 season for Pamesa Valencia in Spain.

== Career statistics ==
Legend
| GP | Games played | GS | Games started | MPG | Minutes per game |
| FG% | Field goal percentage | 3P% | 3-point field goal percentage | FT% | Free throw percentage |
| RPG | Rebounds per game | APG | Assists per game | SPG | Steals per game |
| BPG | Blocks per game | PPG | Points per game | **Bold** | Career high |

=== NBA ===
==== Regular season ====
| Year | Team | GP | GS | MPG | FG% | 3P% | FT% | RPG | APG | SPG | BPG | PPG |
|---|---|---|---|---|---|---|---|---|---|---|---|---|
| 1985–86 | Golden State | 1 | 0 | 1.0 | .000 | – | – | .0 | .0 | .0 | .0 | .0 |
| 1985–86 | Detroit | **2** | 0 | **1.5** | .000 | – | .000 | **.5** | .0 | .0 | .0 | .0 |
| Career | | 3 | 0 | 1.3 | .000 | – | .000 | .3 | .0 | .0 | .0 | .0 |

== See also ==
- List of Montreal athletes
