= Atlantic City Seagulls (basketball) =

American basketball team

- Division: Northern (1996, 1997); Mid-Atlantic (1998, 1999); Northern (2000, 2001)
- League: USBL
- Established: 1996
- Folded: 2001
- Arena: Boardwalk Hall
- Location: Atlantic City, New Jersey
- Team colors: light gray, black, orange
- Ownership: Dead Poetz Society LLC
- Championships: 3 (1997, 1998, 1999)
- Division titles: 4 (1996, 1997, 1998, 1999)

The Atlantic City Seagulls were a professional basketball team based in Atlantic City, New Jersey. They played 6 seasons in the United States Basketball League (USBL), winning 3 consecutive league titles between 1997 and 1999.

== History ==
The franchise was founded in early 1996 by a group of investors led by Philadelphia native Paul Lipschutz. The first coach was Mike Gatley. In their inaugural season, the team won the Northern Division title with a 22–7 record and reached the league finals, after defeating Connecticut Skyhawks in the quarterfinals and the Tampa Bay Windjammers in the semifinals; the Seagulls lost to the Florida Sharks in the USBL finals, 115–118. Former McDonald's All-American and Syracuse guard Michael Lloyd won the USBL Rookie of the Year award, and three players were named to all-league teams (Greg Grant to the All-USBL First Team and Mark Strickland and Ron Anderson to the Second Team).

In April 1997 the Seagulls signed R&B singer R. Kelly to a professional basketball contract. The team ended the regular season with the best record in the league (20–6, .769), won their second division title in a row, and again reached the USBL finals, defeating the Philadelphia Power in the quarterfinals and the Raleigh Cougars in the semifinals. Facing the Long Island Surf in the USBL finals, the Seagulls won the game, 114–112, and obtained their first USBL title. The team could count on the league's top rebounder, Brent Scott, and the season assists leader Mark Baker: Scott and Baker were named Postseason co-MVPs, while coach Kevin Mackey received the Coach of the Year award.

In 1998 the Seagulls were moved to the newly created Mid-Atlantic Division: they finished the season with an 18–8 record (second in the league behind the Long Island Surf's 18–7) and qualified for the playoffs for the third consecutive season. In the second round the team defeated the Atlanta Trojans, 118–107, and in the Final Four they beat the Jacksonville Barracudas, 122–107. For the second season in a row, the Seagulls beat the Long Island Surf in the league finals (100–96) and won the USBL title. Adrian Griffin won the Postseason MVP award.

In 1999 the team won the Mid-Atlantic Division title again with a 23–6 record, the best in the league and also the best in franchise history (.793). They reached the finals after defeating the Tampa Bay Windjammers in the quarterfinals and the Pennsylvania Valleydawgs in the semifinals; in the USBL finals they beat the Connecticut Skyhawks, 83–77, and obtained their third consecutive championship. Adrian Griffin won both the Player of the Year and the Postseason MVP awards, while Kevin Mackey was named the league's Coach of the Year and Lloyd led the league in scoring at 27.3 points per game.

In 2000, the Seagulls' performance dropped: they were assigned to the Northern Division, and they ended with a 12–18 record, the first losing record in their history, and barely qualified for the postseason, where they lost to the Dodge City Legend, 107–122. In 2001 the team lost all 28 games and had the worst record in the history of league, finishing at the last spot of the Northern Division: on that same year, the team was disbanded. In their last season, the Seagulls had averaged less than 100 fans in attendance.

== Season-by-season records ==
Year	Wins	Losses	Win %	Head coach
1996	22	7	.759	Mike Gatley
1997	20	6	.769	Kevin Mackey
1998	18	8	.692	Kevin Mackey
1999	23	6	.793	Kevin Mackey
2000	12	18	.400	Rick Ross
2001	0	28	.000	Patrick Heaton

== Awards ==
- USBL Player of the Year: Adrian Griffin (1999)
- USBL Postseason MVP: Mark Baker & Brent Scott (1997), Adrian Griffin (2×, 1998–1999)
- USBL Rookie of the Year: Michael Lloyd (1996)
- USBL Coach of the Year: Kevin Mackey (2×, 1997 and 1999)

== Notable players ==
Note: Flags indicate national team eligibility at FIBA-sanctioned events. Players may hold other non-FIBA nationalities not displayed.

Criteria

To appear in this section a player must have either:

- Set a club record or won an individual award while at the club
- Played at least one official international match for their national team at any time
- Played at least one official NBA match at any time.

- (United States) Mark Baker
- (United States) Mark Blount
- (United States) William Cunningham
- (United States) Paul Graham
- (United States)
- (United States) Waliyy Dixon(basketball) Greg Grant
- (United States) Evric Gray
- (United States) LaMarr Greer
- (United States) Adrian Griffin
- (United States) Chris Jent
- (United States) Eric Johnson
- (Dominica) Garth Joseph
- (United States) R. Kelly
- (Slovenia) Marijan Kraljević
- (United States) Michael Lloyd
- (United States) Mark Macon
- (United States) Brent Scott
- (United States) Charles Smith
- (United States) Mark Strickland
- (United States) Carl Thomas
- (United States) Charles Thomas
- (Slovenia) Marko Tušek
- (United States) K'zell Wesson
