= Rex Morgan (basketball) =

American basketball player (1948–2016)

Personal information
- Born: October 27, 1948 Charleston, Illinois, U.S.
- Died: January 15, 2016 (aged 67) Jacksonville, Florida, U.S.
- Listed height: 6 ft 5 in (1.96 m)
- Listed weight: 190 lb (86 kg)

Career information
- High school: Charleston (Charleston, Illinois)
- College: Lake Land (1966–1968); Jacksonville (1968–1970)
- NBA draft: 1970: 2nd round, 21st overall pick
- Drafted by: Boston Celtics
- Playing career: 1970–1972, 1992
- Position: Shooting guard
- Number: 20

Career history

Playing
- 1970–1972: Boston Celtics
- 1992: Jacksonville Hooters

Coaching
- 1988–2001: Jacksonville / Daytona Beach Hooters / Jacksonville Shooters / Barracudas / Gulf Coast Sundogs / Lakeland Blue Ducks
- 2002: Saint Joseph Express

Career highlights
- As player: No. 24 retired by Jacksonville Dolphins; As coach: USBL Coach of the Year (1990)
- Stats at NBA.com
- Stats at Basketball Reference

Rex Thomas Morgan (October 27, 1948 – January 15, 2016) was an American professional basketball player and coach. He was drafted in the second round of the 1970 NBA draft by the Boston Celtics and played two seasons with the team in the National Basketball Association (NBA) as a shooting guard.

In college, he played guard for the 1969–70 Jacksonville Dolphins men's basketball team that reached the national championship game, losing to UCLA.

Morgan was a head coach in the United States Basketball League for 14 seasons. He spent 13 seasons with the Jacksonville Hooters franchise from 1988 to 2001 during which time they were also known as the Daytona Beach Hooters, Jacksonville Shooters, Jacksonville Barracudas, Gulf Coast Sundogs and Lakeland Blue Ducks. Morgan was named USBL Coach of the Year in 1990. On June 25, 1992, he activated himself as a player when the Hooters had four players unavailable in a game against the New Jersey Jammers; he scored 12 points in his first professional appearance in 20 years. Morgan also served as coach of the Saint Joseph Express during the 2002 season. He is the winningest coach in the USBL with 196 victories.

== Career statistics ==
Legend
GP	Games played	GS	Games started	MPG	Minutes per game
FG%	Field goal percentage	3P%	3-point field goal percentage	FT%	Free throw percentage
RPG	Rebounds per game	APG	Assists per game	SPG	Steals per game
BPG	Blocks per game	PPG	Points per game	**Bold**	Career high

=== NBA ===
==== Regular season ====
Year	Team	GP	MPG	FG%	FT%	RPG	APG	PPG
1970–71	Boston	**34**	**7.8**	**.402**	.648	**1.8**	**.6**	**3.4**
1971–72	Boston	28	5.4	.320	**.742**	1.1	**.6**	2.0
Career		62	6.7	.375	.682	1.5	.6	2.8

==== Playoffs ====
Year	Team	GP	MPG	FG%	FT%	RPG	APG	PPG
1972	Boston	4	2.5	.143	.333	1.3	.0	.8
