= New Jersey Jammers =

- League: USBL
- Founded: 1985
- Dissolved: 1992
- History: Jersey Jammers (1986–88)
- Arena: Lakewood High School (1985); Yanitelli Center (1986–88)
- Location: Lakewood, New Jersey (1985); Jersey City, New Jersey (1986–88)
- Team colors: blue, orange

The New Jersey Jammers, known also as the Jersey Jammers, was a professional basketball in the United States Basketball League (USBL). The team was a charter franchise of the USBL in 1985.

== History ==
In 1985, the Jammers played home games at Lakewood High School in Lakewood, New Jersey. During the inaugural USBL draft in 1985, the Jammers picked center Ralph Dalton from Georgetown University, second overall. Cazzie Russell was the team's head coach in 1985. New Jersey United States Senator Bill Bradley, a former professional basketball player, said he was sending "good wishes for success to coach Cazzie Russell".

In 1986, the team sold for a $150,000 to an investment group of five people led by Elnardo Webster. Team officials announced the team would play their 1986 home games at Yanitelli Center in Jersey City, New Jersey. During the 1986 USBL territorial draft, the Jammers selected Bill Bradley, who was New Jersey's United States Senator and a former New York Knicks player. The Jammers hired Nate Archibald to head coach in 1986. On August 18, 1986, Jammers guard Byron Strickland set a USBL record for most points scored in a single game with 65 in a game against the Springfield Fame.

In 1987, the Jammers selected college basketball color commentator Dick Vitale as their territorial pick. Henry Bibby served as the Jammers head coach in 1987.

== Season-by-season records ==
Year	GP	W	L	Win %	Head coach
1985	25	18	7	.720	Cazzie Russell
1986	33	14	19	.424	Nate Archibald
1987	30	13	17	.433	Henry Bibby
team was dormant from 1988 to 1991
1992	26	11	15	.423	Bob Nastase
Totals	114	56	58	.491	–

== Notable players ==
- Kent Washington

== See also ==
- New Jersey Gems
- New Jersey Meteors
- New Jersey ShoreCats
