= Sam Worthen =

American former NBA player (born 1958)

Personal information
- Born: January 17, 1958 (age 68) Brooklyn, New York, U.S.
- Listed height: 6 ft 5 in (1.96 m)
- Listed weight: 195 lb (88 kg)

Career information
- High school: Franklin K. Lane (Brooklyn, New York)
- College: McLennan CC (1976–1978); Marquette (1978–1980)
- NBA draft: 1980: 2nd round, 26th overall pick
- Drafted by: Chicago Bulls
- Playing career: 1980–1988
- Position: Shooting guard
- Number: 31
- Coaching career: 1982–2005

Career history

Playing
- 1980–1981: Chicago Bulls
- 1981: Utah Jazz
- 1981–1982: Rochester Zeniths
- 1982–1983: Albany Patroons
- 1983–1985: Puerto Rico Coquis
- 1985: Springfield Fame
- 1985–1986: Maine Windjammers
- 1986: Springfield Fame
- 1986–1987: Charleston Gunners
- 1988: New Haven Skyhawks

Coaching
- 1982–1983: Albany Patroons
- 1987: Miami Tropics
- 1990: New York Whitecaps
- 1994–1995: Harrisburg Hammerheads
- 1997: Long Island Surf
- 1999: Brooklyn Kings
- 2001: Brujos de Guayama
- 2004–2005: Gallitos de Isabela

Career highlights
- Consensus second-team All-American (1980)
- Stats at NBA.com
- Stats at Basketball Reference

Samuel Lee Worthen (born January 17, 1958) is an American former NBA player who currently is touring as the coach of the Washington Generals, the team that perennially loses to the Harlem Globetrotters. He was named in ESPN's "Elite 24: Rucker Park legends".

Sam Worthen was an All-American point guard at Marquette University from 1978 to 1980 under coach Hank Raymonds. He led the Warriors in assists during his junior year and scoring and assists in his senior year. Worthen led the Warriors to a win over 10th ranked Notre Dame on the road in 1980. Worthen was named to Basketball Weekly's second team after his junior and senior seasons. He was also named to Sports Page magazine's first team, United States Basketball Writers Association first team, UPI, third team and top newcomers of 1979, Playboy magazine pre-season basketball edition.

In 1980, he was drafted by the Chicago Bulls in the second round of the NBA draft and played in the NBA for two seasons. Worthen was with the Bulls in 1980–1981 and the Utah Jazz in 1981–1982. In August, 2003 – 23 years after leaving Marquette for the NBA – Worthen completed his undergraduate degree from Marquette's College of Communication

In late 2008, Worthen was the coach of the Generals, playing the bad guy role during the games. He ran such skits as using a "remote controlled" ball that the Globetrotters could not control, putting a piece of hard plastic on top the Globetrotters rim so they could not score and simply adding 30 or so points to the Generals' score by manipulating the scoreboard. At the end of games, he would lose a bet and was forced to wear a pink tutu and a tiara, and carry a shiny magic wand off the court.

Worthen started coaching in 1985 as a player/coach of the United States Basketball League's Springfield Fame guiding them to the league title.

Worthen and the New Haven Skyhawks won the 1988 USBL Championship. He has been the head coach of the Albany Patroons (CBA), Miami Tropics (USBL; 1987 Champions), New York Whitecaps (USBL), Harrisburg Hammerheads (CBA), Fort Wayne Fury (CBA), Long Island Surf (USBL), Brooklyn Kings (USBL), and Baltimore Bayrunners (IBL). Sam also was player coach of the Harlem Wizards show team for 15 years

Worthen was an assistant for three years 2004 through 2007 with the Iona College men's basketball program. He also was the assistant coach of the Fayetteville Patriots of the National Basketball Development League (NBDL).

== Career statistics ==
Legend
GP	Games played	GS	Games started	MPG	Minutes per game
FG%	Field goal percentage	3P%	3-point field goal percentage	FT%	Free throw percentage
RPG	Rebounds per game	APG	Assists per game	SPG	Steals per game
BPG	Blocks per game	PPG	Points per game	**Bold**	Career high

=== NBA ===
==== Regular season ====
Year	Team	GP	GS	MPG	FG%	3P%	FT%	RPG	APG	SPG	BPG	PPG
1980–81	Chicago	**64**		**14.8**	**.495**	.000	**.750**	**1.8**	**1.8**	**.9**	**.1**	**3.7**
1981–82	Utah	5	0	4.4	.400	–	–	.2	.6	.0	.0	.8
Career		69	0	14.0	.492	.000	.750	1.7	1.7	.8	.1	3.5

==== Playoffs ====
Year	Team	GP	MPG	FG%	3P%	FT%	RPG	APG	SPG	BPG	PPG
1981	Chicago	1	1.0	–	–	–	.0	.0	.0	.0	.0
