= Michael Anderson (basketball) =

American basketball player (born 1966)

Personal information
- Born: March 23, 1966 (age 60) Philadelphia, Pennsylvania
- Listed height: 5 ft 11 in (1.80 m)
- Listed weight: 184 lb (83 kg)

Career information
- High school: Carver (Philadelphia, Pennsylvania)
- College: Drexel (1984–1988)
- NBA draft: 1988: 3rd round, 73rd overall pick
- Drafted by: Indiana Pacers
- Playing career: 1988–2002
- Position: Point guard
- Number: 10

Career history
- 1988: Philadelphia Aces
- 1988–1989: Charleston Gunners
- 1989: Rapid City Thrillers
- 1989: San Antonio Spurs
- 1989–1990: Real Madrid
- 1990: Sarsi Sizzlers
- 1990–1991: Rapid City Thrillers
- 1991: Philadelphia Spirit
- 1991: Rapid City Thrillers
- 1991–1992: Tri-City Chinook
- 1992: Philadelphia Spirit
- 1992–1993: Tri-City Chinook
- 1993: Baloncesto León
- 1993: CB Zaragoza
- 1993–1994: Tri-City Chinook
- 1994: CB Girona
- 1994–1995: CB Murcia
- 1995–1997: CB Sevilla
- 1997–1999: Ülkerspor
- 1999: KK Cibona
- 2002: Pennsylvania ValleyDawgs

Career highlights
- EuroLeague steals leader (1997); Spanish League MVP (1996); Turkish League champion (1998); All-CBA First Team (1994); CBA All-Rookie Team (1989); CBA steals leader (1994); 2× ECC Player of the Year (1986, 1988); No. 10 retired by Drexel Dragons
- Stats at NBA.com
- Stats at Basketball Reference

Michael Levin Anderson (born March 23, 1966) is an American former basketball player for Drexel University, the NBA, Spain's professional Liga ACB, the Continental Basketball Association (CBA), the Greek Basket League and the Turkish Basketball Super League.

== College career ==
Anderson was a high school star at George Washington Carver High School of Engineering & Science, in Philadelphia. At Drexel, he averaged over 19 points per game during his college basketball career, and led the Dragons to their first-ever NCAA Men's Division I Basketball Championship appearance in 1986, where they lost to eventual national champion, Louisville. This game was notable because Anderson was playing against familiar local foes, Milt Wagner and Billy Thompson, who played high school ball on Camden's nationally ranked team. That year Anderson was named to the UPI and Sporting News honorable mention All-America teams. Anderson also led the Dragons to an upset of a David Robinson-led Navy team in the Palestra in 1987, one of the biggest wins in school history.

Anderson is ranked 12th all-time in career NCAA steals, with 341, and he is tied for second all-time in career NCAA triple doubles. He was recognized in 2008 by the Colonial Athletic Association as a CAA Men's Basketball Legend, in a class that included University of Maryland and James Madison University head coach Charles "Lefty" Driesell.

== Professional career ==
Anderson would become the first Drexel basketball player to make the roster of an NBA team. He played for the San Antonio Spurs during the 1989 NBA season, after being drafted by the Indiana Pacers in the 3rd round (23rd pick), of the 1988 NBA draft.

Anderson had a successful four-year career in the Spanish ACB League, playing from 1993 to 1997. He played for Real Madrid, Baloncesto León, CB Murcia and Caja San Fernando, garnering league MVP honors in the 1995–96 season, while playing for the latter. He was also a 1993 ACB league All-Star. After that, he played for Ülkerspor in Turkey, and with them he won the 1997–98 Turkish Basketball Super League season championship, while averaging 21.1 points per game. Anderson also played a couple years in the USBL and the Continental Basketball Association (CBA), making the All-Rookie team in 1988–89, with the Charleston Gunners, and making first team All-League with the Tri-City Chinook in 1993–94.

== NBA career statistics ==
Legend
GP	Games played	GS	Games started	MPG	Minutes per game
FG%	Field goal percentage	3P%	3-point field goal percentage	FT%	Free throw percentage
RPG	Rebounds per game	APG	Assists per game	SPG	Steals per game
BPG	Blocks per game	PPG	Points per game	**Bold**	Career high

=== Regular season ===
Year	Team	GP	GS	MPG	FG%	3P%	FT%	RPG	APG	SPG	BPG	PPG
1988–89	San Antonio	36	12	20.3	.417	.143	.695	2.5	4.3	1.2	0.1	5.7
Career		36	12	20.3	.417	.143	.695	2.5	4.3	1.2	0.1	5.7

== See also ==
- List of NCAA Division I men's basketball career free throw scoring leaders
- List of NCAA Division I men's basketball career steals leaders
- List of NCAA Division I basketball career triple-doubles leaders
