= Shelton Jones =

American basketball player (born 1966)

Personal information
- Born: April 6, 1966 (age 60) Copiague, New York, U.S.
- Listed height: 6 ft 9 in (2.06 m)
- Listed weight: 210 lb (95 kg)

Career information
- High school: Amityville Memorial (Amityville, New York)
- College: St. John's (1984–1988)
- NBA draft: 1988: 2nd round, 27th overall pick
- Drafted by: San Antonio Spurs
- Playing career: 1988–2004
- Position: Small forward
- Number: 31

Career history
- 1988: San Antonio Spurs
- 1988: Golden State Warriors
- 1988–1989: Tulsa Fast Breakers
- 1989: Philadelphia 76ers
- 1990–1991: Atletico Madrid
- 1991: Treasure Coast Tropics
- 1992–1993: Rapid City Thrillers
- 1993: Pallacanestro Venezia
- 1993–1994: Pallacanestro Virtus Roma
- 1994: Rapid City Thrillers
- 1994–1995: Hapoel Holon
- 1995–1996: Florida Beachdogs
- 1996: Hapoel Holon
- 1996–1997: Oklahoma City Cavalry
- 1997: Leones de Ponce
- 1997: Long Island Surf
- 1998: Panteras de Miranda
- 1998: Ourense Baloncesto
- 1998: Long Island Surf
- 1999: Tampa Bay Windjammers
- 1999–2000: Connecticut Pride
- 2000: Florida Sea Dragons
- 2000–2001: JL Bourg-en-Bresse
- 2001: Los Minas Leneros
- 2001: Juarez Gallos de Pelea
- 2003–2004: Great Lakes Storm

Career highlights
- Italian League All-Star (1993); CBA champion (1997); CBA Most Valuable Player (1996); CBA All-Star Game MVP (1996); All-CBA First Team (1996); Second-team All-Big East (1988); McDonald's All-American (1984)
- Stats at NBA.com
- Stats at Basketball Reference

Shelton Jones (born April 6, 1966) is an American former professional basketball player who played collegiately at St. John's University. He was selected by the San Antonio Spurs in the second round (27th pick overall) of the 1988 NBA draft. Shelton played only one year in the NBA, during the 1988–89 season. He split the year between the Spurs, the Golden State Warriors, and the Philadelphia 76ers, for whom he also appeared in the NBA Slam Dunk Contest, finishing in 4th place after advancing to the semi-finals. After the season, he was selected by the Minnesota Timberwolves as the 16th pick in the 1989 NBA expansion draft. After his selection, he said: "I'm a little stunned right now. I thought I'd be taken by Orlando because I'd heard some things. Things like this happen. That's the kind of year I had. I'll make the best of the situation. I look forward to getting out there and meeting with the coach. I don't even know who it is.". As it turned out, the Timberwolves waived him before the season began, and he never played in the NBA again, although he did have a long career playing in various other leagues.

Jones played in the Continental Basketball Association (CBA) for the Tulsa Fast Breakers, Rapid City Thrillers, Florida Beachdogs, Oklahoma City Cavalry, Connecticut Pride and Great Lakes Storm from 1988 to 2004. He won a CBA championship with the Cavalry in 1997. He was selected as the CBA Most Valuable Player and All-Star Game Most Valuable Player and named to the All-CBA First Team in 1996.

After his playing career, Jones founded the Shelton Jones Foundation, which "trains and mentors student-athletes to become successful in life through sports, community outreach and personal development".

== Career statistics ==
Legend
GP	Games played	GS	Games started	MPG	Minutes per game
FG%	Field goal percentage	3P%	3-point field goal percentage	FT%	Free throw percentage
RPG	Rebounds per game	APG	Assists per game	SPG	Steals per game
BPG	Blocks per game	PPG	Points per game	**Bold**	Career high

=== NBA ===
==== Regular season ====
Year	Team	GP	GS	MPG	FG%	3P%	FT%	RPG	APG	SPG	BPG	PPG
1988–89	San Antonio	7	0	13.1	.360	–	.615	**2.3**	**1.0**	.3	**.3**	3.7
1988–89	Golden State	2	0	6.5	**.600**	–	–	1.0	**1.0**	**1.5**	.0	3.0
1988–89	Philadelphia	**42**	**34**	**13.7**	.453	.000	**.746**	**2.3**	.8	.4	**.3**	**5.0**
Career		51	34	13.4	.445	.000	.725	2.2	.8	.4	.3	4.8
