= Kareem Reid =

American basketball player (born 1975)

Personal information
- Born: August 27, 1975 (age 51) Bronx, New York, U.S.
- Listed height: 5 ft 11 in (1.80 m)
- Listed weight: 160 lb (73 kg)

Career information
- High school: St. Raymond (Bronx, New York)
- College: Arkansas (1995–1999)
- NBA draft: 1999: undrafted
- Playing career: 1999–2012
- Position: Point guard

Career history
- 1999–2000: Richmond Rhythm
- 2000: Efes Pilsen
- 2000–2001: Richmond Rhythm
- 2001–2002: Harlem Globetrotters
- 2003: Grand Rapids Hoops
- 2003: Pennsylvania ValleyDawgs
- 2003–2004: Asheville Altitude
- 2004: Westchester Wildfire
- 2004–2005: Arkansas RimRockers
- 2005: Westchester Wildfire
- 2005: Pennsylvania ValleyDawgs
- 2005–2006: Arkansas RimRockers
- 2006–2007: RiverCatz Arkansas
- 2007: Arkansas Aeros
- 2007: Albany Patroons
- 2007–2008: JL Bourg-en-Bresse
- 2008–2011: JA Vichy
- 2011: SPO Rouen Basket

Career highlights
- McDonald's All-American (1994); ABA All Star-Game (2005); ABA Assists Leader 2005

Kareem Reid (born August 27, 1975) is an American former point guard in the National Basketball Development League. He played college basketball for the University of Arkansas Razorbacks, and went on to play professionally in several leagues in the United States and Europe. Reid is also a well known street-ball player in the Bronx, playing in the Rucker Park league, where he won three consecutive championships at the Entertainers Ballers Classic from 2002 to 2004. He was named in ESPN's "Elite 24: Rucker Park legends".

== High school career ==
Reid led St. Raymond High School for Boys to New York City and state championships as a junior in 1993, and to the city championship as a senior in 1994. One of the top rated point guards in the country as a senior, Reid was named a McDonald's All-American, and signed with the Arkansas Razorbacks after being discovered by Head Coach Nolan Richardson while playing in the King Cotton Classic in Pine Bluff, Arkansas. Reid participated in the 1994 U.S. Olympic Festival, helping his East team to a silver medal.

== Collegiate years ==
Reid was forced to sit out the 1994–95 season at the University of Arkansas because his ACT score was disputed by the NCAA. Opening the 1995–96 season as a freshman, Reid led the Razorbacks to the Sweet Sixteen of the 1996 NCAA Tournament, and the NIT Final Four as a sophomore. He finished his Razorback career as the all-time leader in assists with 748, and third all-time in steals with 251. Reid averaged 11.3 points, 5.7 assists, and 1.91 steals per game for the Razorbacks. Reid was named to the All-SEC Freshman Team after the 1995–96 season, and was named 2nd Team All-SEC as a sophomore.

== Professional career ==
Despite averaging 10.3 points and 8.7 assists at the 1999 Portsmouth Invitational Tournament, Reid went undrafted by the NBA. Reid went on to play in several professional leagues in the United States and overseas, including a stint with the Harlem Globetrotters. In 2003, Reid signed a free agent contract with the New Orleans Hornets, but was released prior to the start of the regular season. Reid played well during his time with the Hornets, causing Baron Davis to comment that he was as difficult to guard as any NBA, and wanted him to remain on the team.

After his release from the Hornets, Reid signed with the Asheville Altitude, leading them to the NBDL championship in the 2003–04 season. Reid averaged 12.0 points per game, and finished third in the league with 6.7 assists per game. He joined the Arkansas Rimrockers for their inaugural season in the American Basketball Association, leading the league in assists at 9.0 per game. Reid was named league MVP and earned the Championship Game MVP in the Rimrockers' championship win after the 2004–05 season. He remained with the Rimrockers when the team moved the NBA Development League for the 2005–06 season, leading the league in assists with an average of 8.1 per game.

Reid was signed by the Albany Patroons of the Continental Basketball Association On February 23, 2007. Reid also played for the team while it was in the United States Basketball League. He played for JA Vichy in France from 2008 to January 2011 when he left the team. He played the 2011–12 season with Hyères-Toulon Var Basket in France, averaging 7.6 assists per game.

== Street ball career ==
Reid has been known by the nickname "The Best Kept Secret" since his years on the playground hoops scene in the Bronx. In 2004, Reid led the Terror Squad team owned by Fat Joe to their third consecutive Entertainer's Basketball Classic championship. Reid scored the final nine points in a come-from-behind victory over a California team that featured NBA players Baron Davis and Gilbert Arenas, and was named the game's MVP.

== See also ==
- Arkansas Razorbacks men's basketball
- Streetball
- Rucker Park
- Harlem Globetrotters
