= Tony Costner =

American basketball player (born 1962)

Personal information
- Born: June 30, 1962 (age 64) Montclair, New Jersey, U.S.
- Listed height: 6 ft 10 in (2.08 m)
- Listed weight: 260 lb (118 kg)

Career information
- High school: Overbrook (Philadelphia, Pennsylvania)
- College: Saint Joseph's (1980–1984)
- NBA draft: 1984: 2nd round, 34th overall pick
- Drafted by: Washington Bullets
- Playing career: 1984–1997
- Position: Center

Career history
- 1984–1985: Basket Napoli
- 1985–1986: Claret Las Palmas
- 1987–1988: Fantoni Udine
- 1988: Tulsa Fast Breakers
- 1989: Rochester Flyers
- 1989–1990: Montpellier
- 1990–1991: Rockford Lightning
- 1991: Philadelphia Spirit
- 1991–1992: CSP Limoges
- 1992: Philadelphia Spirit
- 1992–1993: Sporting Athens
- 1993–1994: AEK Athens
- 1994: Estudiantes de Bahía Blanca
- 1994–1996: Sporting Athens
- 1996–1997: Papagou

Career highlights
- Greek League All-Star (1994 II); AP Honorable mention All-American (1983); 2× First-team All-Atlantic 10 (1983, 1984); Fourth-team Parade All-American (1980)
- Stats at Basketball Reference

Tony Costner (born June 30, 1962) is an American former professional basketball player, who was selected by the Washington Bullets, in the second round (34th pick overall) of the 1984 NBA draft. He played professionally in Europe and in the Continental Basketball Association (CBA). Costner was a 6-foot-10-inch (2.08 m) tall center, that played in college at Saint Joseph's University. He is the father of former professional basketball player Brandon Costner.

== Early life ==
Costner graduated from Overbrook High School, in Philadelphia, in 1980. In 2012, Costner was recognized by the Philadelphia Daily News, as a Third-Team All City member, on its list of the "Best high school hoops players of the past 35 years".

== College career ==
Costner decided to stay in Philadelphia for his collegiate career. He played at the center position for the Saint Joseph Hawks, from 1980 to 1984. He averaged 14.4 points, 7.9 rebounds and 1.1 assists per game in his college career. As a Senior, Costner averaged 18.6 points, 8.3 rebounds and 1.2 assists per game, as Saint Joseph's finished the season with a 20–9 record, under head coach Jim Boyle.

On December 30, 1983, Costner scored 47 points in a game versus Alaska-Anchorage, which still stands as the Saint Joseph's single-game scoring record. During his college career, Costner was an Atlantic 10 All-Conference selection in his junior and senior seasons, a three-time All-Big 5 selection, and an Associated Press Honorable Mention All-America selection in 1983. In his college career, Costner scored a total of 1,730 career points, to go along with a total of 951 career rebounds.

== Professional career ==
On June 19, 1984, the NBA's Washington Bullets, selected Costner in the second round, with the 34th overall pick of the 1984 NBA draft. Costner went on to play pro club basketball in Europe, starting his career with Basket Napoli. With Las Palmas, Costner averaged 20.4 points, 10.1 rebounds, and 0.9 assists per game, in 21 regular season games played, during the 1985–86 season. He spent the 1987–88 season with A.P.U. Udine.

Costner also played in the Continental Basketball Association (CBA), with the Tulsa Fast Breakers, Rockford Lightning, Rochester Flyers, and Philadelphia Spirit. He averaged 11.5 points, 8.0 rebounds and 1.5 assists per game, in his 54-games career with the Rockford Lightning. In Europe, he also played with Montpellier (1989–90), Limoges (1991–92), Sporting Athens (1992–93), AEK Athens (1993–94), Estudiantes Bahía Blanca (1994), Sporting Athens (1994–96), and Papagou Athens (1996–97).

== Personal life ==
Costner is the father of former North Carolina State and professional player Brandon Costner.

== Awards and accomplishments ==
- Saint Joseph's Men's Basketball Hall of Fame Inductee (1989).
- Philadelphia Big 5 Hall of Fame Inductee (1990).
