= Toronto Tornados =

- League: CBA 1983–1985
- Founded: 1983
- Folded: 1985
- Arena: Varsity Arena
- Capacity: 4,116
- Location: Toronto
- Team colors: Blue and white
- President: Ted Stepien
- Head coach: Gerald Oliver 1983–1985; Keith Fowler 1985
- Championships: 0

The Toronto Tornados were a professional basketball team in the Continental Basketball Association (CBA) that played in Toronto from 1983 to December 1985.

The team was owned by Ted Stepien who had threatened to move his Cleveland Cavaliers team of the National Basketball Association to Toronto in 1983 (where they would have been renamed the Towers, with a logo similar to the one used by the Tornados), but instead sold the team to new owners in Cleveland. He then bought a franchise in the CBA in May 1983. Stepien hired former Cavaliers assistant coach Gerald Oliver as the first coach and general manager of the Tornados. Team publicist Malcolm Kelly briefly took over the GM role in December 1984 but quit within weeks in frustration with Stepien. He was succeeded by Keith Fowler, who was also assistant coach and would replace Oliver as head coach later that season.

The team played its home games at Varsity Arena. In its first season (1983–84), it averaged average 1,224 fans at 22 home games. That fell to 850 in second season and had fallen again in the third season when Stepien decided in mid-season to move the team to Pensacola, Florida where it became the Pensacola Tornados. Stepien estimated the team lost US$700,000 over its first two seasons.

First season players for the Tornados included Carl Nicks, Peter Thibeaux, Bobby Cattage, Dudley Bradley, Larry McNeill, Robert Smith, Tracy Jackson, Ron Crevier, Walter Jordan, Wayne Abrams, Greg Hines, and Calvin Roberts.

In its first season, the team had a record of 16-28 and finished last in its division. The Tornados improved to 26-22 in their second season—including a 15-2 run at the end of the season—good enough for the final playoff spot in the Eastern Division. Stepien fired coach Oliver just before the first playoff game and replaced him with Fowler after Walter Jordan declined a player-coach role. In the first round of the playoffs (Eastern Division semi-final), the team was eliminated three games to two by defending champions Albany Patroons, coached by Phil Jackson. It was the Tornados' only playoff appearance. The team started the 1985-86 season with a 2-7 record and then moved to Pensacola. After finishing the season there, the franchise moved to Jacksonville, Florida and became the Jacksonville Jets.
