= Kansas Cagerz =

- League: USBL 1998–2007
- Founded: 1998
- History: Columbus Cagerz; 1998; Kansas Cagerz; 1999–2007
- Arena: Bicentennial Center
- Location: Salina, Kansas
- Team colors: Red, white, black
- Head coach: Francis Flax
- Ownership: Kansas Sportz, LLC
- Championships: 1 USBL (2007)

The Kansas Cagerz were a United States Basketball League team based in Salina, Kansas beginning in 1999.

== History ==
During the 1997 United States Basketball League season, the ownership group Sports Management Professionals (SMP), led by Richard J. Donovan and James I. Williamson, assumed ownership of the Tampa Bay Windjammers. In response to this effort by SMP, the United States Basketball League awarded a franchise for the 1998 season to SMP. That franchise would become known as the Columbus Cagerz, playing for one year in Columbus, Ohio. Following that inaugural season, the franchise was moved to Salina, Kansas.

SMP managed the Kansas Cagerz franchise for two years (1999 and 2000) in Kansas. The last head coach was Francis Flax. The Kansas Cagerz won the final championship of the USBL in 2007, defeating the Brooklyn Kings 95–92 in Enid, Oklahoma. The USBL did not return after the 2007 season.

== Seasons ==
Stagione	League	Name	W	G	%	Place	Play-off
1998	USBL	Columbus Cagerz	9	16	36,0	3º	Second round
1999	USBL	Kansas Cagerz	18	9	66,7	1º	Quartier finals
2000	USBL	Kansas Cagerz	18	12	60,0	2º	Semifinals
2001	USBL	Kansas Cagerz	18	12	60,0	2º	Quartier finals
2002	USBL	Kansas Cagerz	21	9	70,0	1º	Finals
2003	USBL	Kansas Cagerz	15	15	50,0	3º	Quartier finals
2004	USBL	Kansas Cagerz	20	10	66,7	2º	Semifinals
2005	USBL	Kansas Cagerz	17	13	56,7	3º	Semifinals
2006	USBL	Kansas Cagerz	15	15	50,0	4º	Semifinals
2007	USBL	Kansas Cagerz	14	15	48,3	5º	Champions

== Notable players ==
- (United States) Ryan Robertson
- (United States) Ira Newble
- (United States) Billy Thomas
- (United States) Devin Brown
- (United States) Darrin Hancock
- (United States) Jeff Boschee
- (United States) Keith Langford
- Michael C Jordan

== See also ==
- Kansas City Knights
