= Frederick Pea =

American basketball player

Fred Lewis
Personal information
- Born: 1969 (age 56–57)
- Listed height: 6 ft 7 in (2.01 m)
- Listed weight: 233 lb (106 kg)

Career information
- College: Tampa (1986–1987); South Florida (1989–1992)
- NBA draft: 1992: undrafted
- Position: Guard / forward
- Number: 5

Career history
- 1992: Tampa Bay Sunblasters
- 1992: Jacksonville Hooters
- 1993: Louisville Shooters
- 1995: Sta. Lucia Realtors

Fred Lewis (born 1969) is a retired American professional basketball player who played his college career at the University of South Florida.

The Wichita Falls Texans picked Lewis in the second round of the 1992 Continental League draft. Lewis didn't make a jump to the Continental ranks until the 1993-94 season, however, he polished his skills in the United States Basketball League and the Global Basketball Association before going to the CBA. In 1992, Lewis was the USBL Rookie of the year after averaging 20.7 points and eight rebounds for the Tampa Bay Sunblasters and Jacksonville Hooters. The next year, he raised his average to 22 points for Daytona Beach in the same league and was on the Louisville Shooters roster when the Global Basketball Association folded up in 1993. Lewis' exploits in the USBL spread among pro scouts and led to a contracts in Israel.

In 1995, when he came to play in the Philippine Basketball Association, while applying for a work permit, documents pick up the surname in his passport. Lewis is actually his father's surname but his birth certificate indicates his mother's surname Pea instead, and since the surname in his travel papers was lifted from his birth certificate, Lewis was known as Frederick Pea in the PBA.
