= Connecticut Skyhawks =

Defunct minor league basketball team

- League: United States Basketball League
- Founded: 1985
- Dissolved: 2001
- History: Connecticut Colonels; 1985; New Haven Skyhawks; 1988, 1990-92; Connecticut Skyhawks; 1993–1999
- Arena: William H. Pitt Center; 1998-99; Jonathan Law High School; 1993-97; Charger Gymnasium; 1991-92
- Championships: 1988
- Division/conference titles: 1988, 1999

The Connecticut Skyhawks were a men's spring-professional basketball team in the United States Basketball League.

== History ==
The Skyhawks were founded in 1985 as the Connecticut Colonels. The Colonels suspended operations until the 1988 season, when the team was re-branded as the New Haven Skyhawks. The Skyhawks would defeat the Palm Beach Stingrays for the USBL Championship that season, 134–126. Following their return to the league, the USBL suspended operations for all teams until 1990.

After the return of the league in 1990, the Skyhawks would continue to carry the New Haven banner, until 1993, when the team rebranded to the Connecticut Skyhawks. During the 1999 season, the Skyhawks would lose to the defending champions, Atlantic City Seagulls, in that season's championship game 83–77. The Skyhawks would dissolve following that season.

== Season-by-season records ==
Year	Wins	Losses	Win %	Head coach	Place	Play-offs
Connecticut Colonels
1985	13	10	.565		3º	-
New Haven Skyhawks
1988	18	12	.600		3º	Champions
1990	7	7	.500		2º	-
1991	10	10	.500		2º	-
1992	10	16	.385		4º	-
Connecticut Skyhawks
1993	8	16	.417		6º	Quarter-finals
1994	12	15	.444		3º	Quarter-finals
1995	6	20	.231		8º	-
1996	9	18	.333		4º	Quarter-finals
1997	13	13	.500		3º	Quarter-finals
1998	17	9	.654	Ray Hodge	2º	Semifinals
1999	20	9	.690		1º	Finals

== Team awards ==
All-USBL Teams
First Team

- Earl Cureton (1991)
- Jay Edwards (1992)

Second Team

- Joe Dawson (1985)
- Bobby Parks (1988)
- Damari Riddick (1990)
- Shaun McDaniels (1990)
- Tharon Mayes (1991)
- Anthony Pullard (1992)
- Derrick Canada (1995)
- Kevin Ollie (1996, 1997)
- Seth Marshall (1998)
- Rasaun Young (1999)
- Curt Smith (1999)

USBL All-Rookie Team

- Marvin Alexander (1988)
- Tony Judkins (1990)
- Phil Gamble (1990)
- Mark Brisker (1992)
- Pervires Greene (1993)
- Godfrey Thompson (1993)
- Damian Owens (1998)
- Danny Johnson (1999)

USBL All-Defensive Team

- Alven Frederick (1985)
- Bobby Parks (1988)
- Gary Massey (1990)
- Godfrey Thompson (1994, 1995, 1999)
- Joe Hooks (1996)
- Shane Drisdon (1998)

USBL Coach of the Year

- Ray Hodge (1998)

USBL Postseason MVP

- Bobby Parks (1988)
