= Jackson Wildcats =

Basketball team in Jackson, Mississippi

- League: USBL 2002–2007
- Founded: 2002
- History: Adirondack Wildcats; 2002–2004; Jackson Wildcats; 2007
- Arena: Mississippi Basketball & Athletics
- Location: Jackson, Mississippi
- Team colors: Red, black, gray, white
- Head coach: Wallace Bryant
- Ownership: Carlos Moore
- Championships: 0

The Jackson Wildcats were a United States Basketball League team located in Jackson, Mississippi.

== History ==
The Wildcats were originally located in Glens Falls, New York as the Adirondack Wildcats. The new ownership announced the move to Mississippi on December 1, 2006.

Plans for the team to play at the Mississippi Coast Coliseum were nixed when the team and venue could not agree on a lease; the Wildcats later played some home games at a local community center. As of May 1, 2007, the Jackson Wildcats were removed from the USBL schedule.

== Seasons ==
Stagione	League	Name	W	G	%	Place	Play-off
2002	USBL	Adirondack Wildcats	21	9	70,0	2º	Semifinals
2003	USBL	Adirondack Wildcats	16	14	53,3	3º	Quartier finals
2004	USBL	Adirondack Wildcats	15	15	50,0	3º	Quartier finals
