= Brent Scott (basketball) =

American basketball player and coach

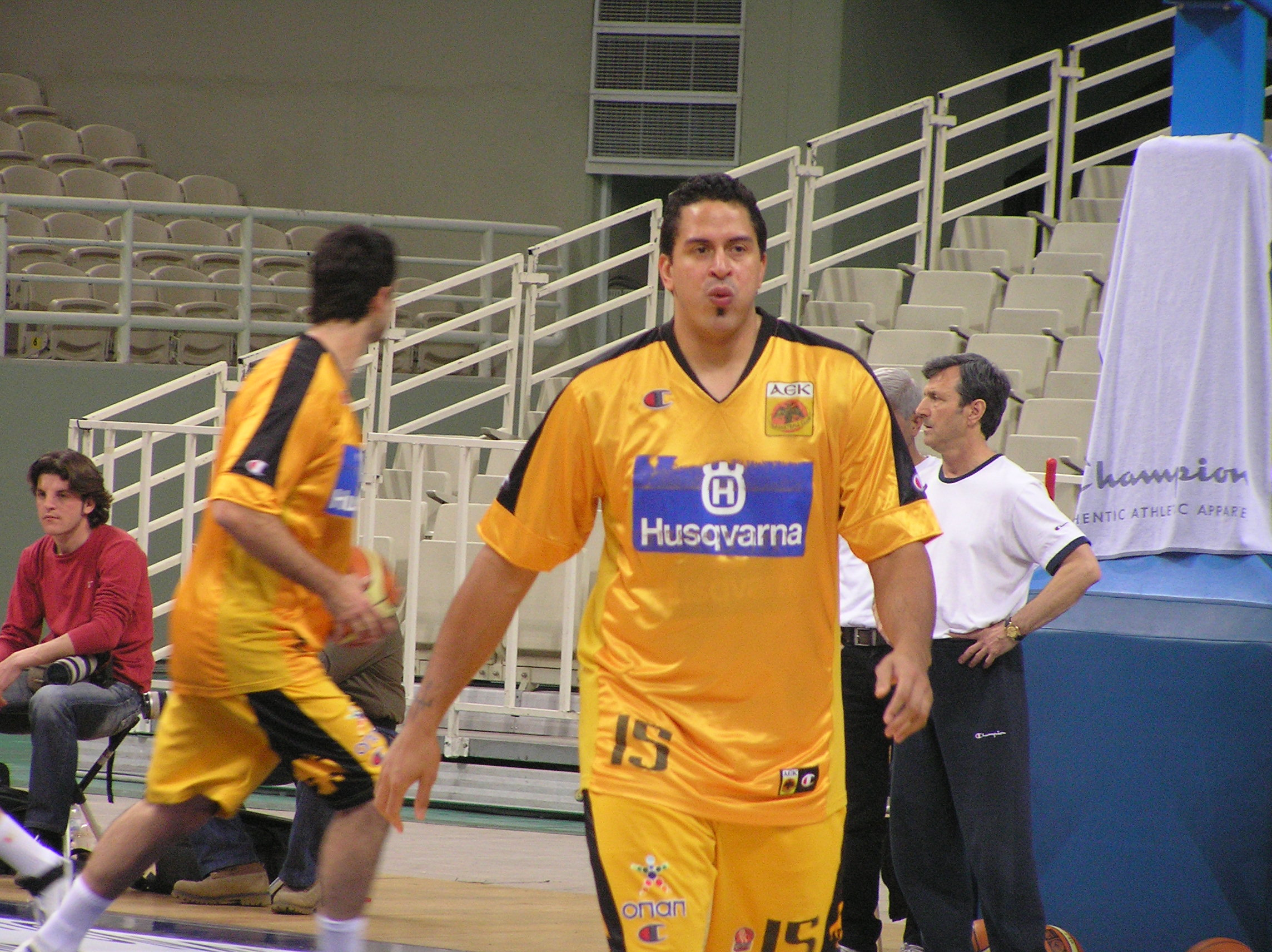

Penn State Nittany Lions
- Title: Assistant coach
- League: Big Ten Conference

Personal information
- Born: June 15, 1971 (age 55) Jackson, Michigan, U.S.
- Listed height: 6 ft 10 in (2.08 m)
- Listed weight: 250 lb (113 kg)

Career information
- High school: Everett (Lansing, Michigan)
- College: Rice (1989–1993)
- NBA draft: 1993: undrafted
- Playing career: 1993–2007
- Position: Center
- Number: 55, 15
- Coaching career: 2007–present

Career history

Playing
- 1993–1995: Gymnastikos S. Larissas
- 1995: Miami Tropics
- 1995–1996: Olitalia Forlì
- 1996: Portland Mountain Cats
- 1996–1997: Indiana Pacers
- 1997: Atlantic City Seagulls
- 1997–1998: Tau Cerámica
- 1998–1999: Viola Reggio Calabria
- 1999–2000: Real Madrid Baloncesto
- 2000–2001: Viola Reggio Calabria
- 2001–2002: Snaidero Udine
- 2002–2003: PAOK
- 2003–2004: Polaris World Murcia
- 2004–2005: Joventut Badalona
- 2006: Anwil Wloclawek
- 2006–2007: AEK Athens

Coaching
- 2007–2008: Rice (assistant)
- 2008–2012: LSU (assistant)
- 2012–2016: TCU (assistant)
- 2016–2017: Rice (assistant)
- 2017–2023: VCU (assistant)
- 2023–present: Penn State (assistant)

Career highlights
- 2× Italian League All-Star (1998, 2001); 2× Greek League All-Star (1994 I, 1994 II); USBL MVP (1996); USBL Scoring leader (1996); 2× USBL Rebounds leader (1995, 1997)
- Stats at NBA.com
- Stats at Basketball Reference
Medals
Men's basketball
Representing United States
FIBA Americas U18 Championship
Gold medal – first place	1990 Montevideo	Team competition
FIBA U19 World Championship
Gold medal – first place	1991 Edmonton	Team competition

Brent Steven Scott (born June 15, 1971) is an American former professional basketball player, formerly in the NBA. Scott was a 6'10", 250 lb (110 kg). center. Scott is currently an assistant coach at Penn State.

== College career ==
Scott played college basketball at Rice University.

== Professional career ==
Scott played 16 games with the Indiana Pacers during the 1996–97 NBA season, averaging 1.2 points and 0.6 rebounds per game. He also played professionally in Poland (Anwil Wloclawek), Spain (for Tau Cerámica, Real Madrid Baloncesto, Polaris World Murcia), Italy (for Olitalia Forlì, Viola Reggio Calabria and Snaidero Udine) and Greece (Gymnastikos S. Larissas, PAOK and AEK Athens).

== Coaching career ==
On June 25, 2007, Rice University announced that Scott would be an assistant basketball coach. He has since served in the same capacity at Louisiana State University and TCU, both under head coach Trent Johnson. On May 16, 2016, Scott returned to his alma mater Rice, after four years at TCU, to serve on Mike Rhoades staff. In March 2017, he joined Rhoades' staff at VCU.
