= Marques Bragg =

American basketball player (born 1970)

Personal information
- Born: March 24, 1970 (age 56) East Orange, New Jersey
- Listed height: 6 ft 9 in (2.06 m)
- Listed weight: 270 lb (122 kg)

Career information
- High school: Clifford J Scott (East Orange, New Jersey)
- College: Providence (1988–1992)
- NBA draft: 1992: undrafted
- Playing career: 1992–2003
- Position: Power forward
- Number: 33

Career history
- 1992: Philadelphia Spirit
- 1992–1993: Caen Basket Calvados
- 1993–1994: Gravelines
- 1994: Alaska Milkmen
- 1994–1995: Grand Rapids Mackers
- 1995: New Jersey Turnpike
- 1995–1996: Minnesota Timberwolves
- 1996: Pamesa Valencia
- 1996: Sunkist Orange Juicers
- 1996–1997: Darüşşafaka Cooper Tires
- 1997: Ciudad de Huelva
- 1998: New Jersey Shore Cats
- 1998–1999: Unitri/Uberlândia
- 1999: Capitanes de Arecibo
- 1999–2000: Sicilia Barcellona
- 2000–2001: Lineltex Imola
- 2001: Ourense
- 2001: ALM Évreux
- 2001–2002: Conad Rimini
- 2002–2003: Sicilia Barcellona
- 2003: Strasbourg IG

Career highlights
- All-CBA First Team (1995); CBA Newcomer of the Year (1995); Third-team All-Big East (1992)
- Stats at NBA.com
- Stats at Basketball Reference

Marques Bragg (born March 24, 1970) is a retired American professional basketball player who played in the NBA with the Minnesota Timberwolves.

Bragg was a Providence Friar in college, and co-led the Big East Conference in Field goal percentage with Dikembe Mutombo in 1991. He went undrafted out of college, but played in 53 games with the Timberwolves in the 1995–96 season (averaging 2.5 PPG and 1.5 RPG in 7.0 minutes).

Bragg played for the Grand Rapids Mackers of the Continental Basketball Association (CBA) during the 1994–95 season. He was selected as the CBA Newcomer of the Year and named to the All-CBA First Team.
