= New Jersey Meteors =

- League: USBL 2007
- Founded: 2007
- History: Boston Freedom; 2007; New Jersey Meteors; 2007
- Arena: Asbury Park Convention Center
- Location: Monmouth, New Jersey
- Team colors: black, white
- Championships: 0

The New Jersey Meteors were a United States Basketball League team located in Monmouth, New Jersey. The Meteors were originally scheduled as the Boston Freedom but moved to New Jersey before the start of the season.

They played their first game against the Albany Patroons on April 13, 2007, losing with a final score of 128–70. Though they played their first game as scheduled, they would not have been able to without the help of both the Patroons and the CBA. First the Patroons loaned them one of their players and directed their cut players to the Meteors' roster; then the CBA director of operations Dennis Truax sat in as their coach.

After the first-game antics, the Meteors canceled their next game and on April 16 the league pulled them from the schedule and franchise list. On April 17 the league released a statement and an apology regarding their demise.
