= Shawnelle Scott =

American basketball player (born 1972)

Personal information
- Born: July 16, 1972 (age 54) New York City, New York, U.S.
- Listed height: 6 ft 10 in (2.08 m)
- Listed weight: 250 lb (113 kg)

Career information
- High school: All Hallows (New York City, New York)
- College: St. John's (1990–1994)
- NBA draft: 1994: 2nd round, 43rd overall pick
- Drafted by: Portland Trail Blazers
- Playing career: 1994–2006
- Position: Center
- Number: 36, 44

Career history
- 1994–1995: Oklahoma City Cavalry
- 1995–1996: Connecticut Pride
- 1996: Long Island Surf
- 1996–1998: Cleveland Cavaliers
- 1998–1999: Connecticut Pride
- 1999: Titanes de Morovis
- 1999–2000: Connecticut Pride
- 2000: Gigantes de Carolina
- 2000–2001: San Antonio Spurs
- 2001–2002: Denver Nuggets
- 2002–2003: Metis Varese
- 2003–2004: Teramo Basket
- 2004: Indios de Mayagüez
- 2004–2005: Jilin Northeast Tigers
- 2004–2005: Olympia Larissa
- 2005–2006: Strong Island Sound

Career highlights
- CBA champion (1999)

Career NBA statistics
- Points: 189(1.8 ppg)
- Rebounds: 228 (2.2 rpg)
- Blocks: 23 (0.2 apg)
- Stats at NBA.com
- Stats at Basketball Reference

Shawnelle Scott (born June 16, 1972) is an American former professional basketball player. A 6'10" center out of St. John's University, he was selected by the Portland Trail Blazers with the 43rd overall pick (second round) of the 1994 NBA draft. His first two years of professional basketball were in the Continental Basketball Association for the Oklahoma City Cavalry and the Connecticut Pride. He then played in four NBA seasons for three teams: Cleveland Cavaliers (1996-97 and 1997-98), San Antonio Spurs (2000-01), and Denver Nuggets (2001-02). He won a CBA championship with the Pride in 1999.

Scott currently works as a high school basketball coach and physics teacher at Millennium Brooklyn High School in New York City.
