= Tracy Jackson =

American basketball player (born 1959)

Personal information
- Born: April 21, 1959 (age 67) Rockville, Maryland, U.S.
- Listed height: 6 ft 6 in (1.98 m)
- Listed weight: 205 lb (93 kg)

Career information
- High school: Paint Branch (Burtonsville, Maryland)
- College: Notre Dame (1977–1981)
- NBA draft: 1981: 2nd round, 25th overall pick
- Drafted by: Boston Celtics
- Playing career: 1981–1985
- Position: Shooting guard
- Number: 11, 7

Career history
- 1981: Boston Celtics
- 1981–1983: Chicago Bulls
- 1983–1984: Toronto Tornados
- 1984: Indiana Pacers
- 1985: Springfield Fame

Career highlights
- Third-team Parade All-American (1977); McDonald's All-American (1977)
- Stats at NBA.com
- Stats at Basketball Reference

Tracy Cordell Jackson (born April 21, 1959) is an American former professional basketball player who played in the National Basketball Association (NBA). He attended Paint Branch High School in Burtonsville, Maryland, and was named to the inaugural McDonald's All-American team, which played in the 1977 Capital Classic. He played college basketball for the Notre Dame Fighting Irish.

Jackson was selected in the second round 1981 NBA draft by the Boston Celtics and split the 1981–82 season playing for both them and the Chicago Bulls. His most productive season was in 1982–83 with the Bulls when he participated in 78 games, averaging 6.3 points and 2.3 rebounds per game. The following NBA season (1983–84), his final in the league, consisted of two games with the Indiana Pacers.

== Career statistics ==
Legend
GP	Games played	GS	Games started	MPG	Minutes per game
FG%	Field goal percentage	3P%	3-point field goal percentage	FT%	Free throw percentage
RPG	Rebounds per game	APG	Assists per game	SPG	Steals per game
BPG	Blocks per game	PPG	Points per game	**Bold**	Career high

=== NBA ===
==== Regular season ====
Year	Team	GP	GS	MPG	FG%	3P%	FT%	RPG	APG	SPG	BPG	PPG
1981–82	Boston	11	0	6.0	.385	–	.600	1.1	.5	.3	.0	2.4
1981–82	Chicago	38	0	10.8	**.473**	–	.821	1.3	.6	.3	**.1**	4.5
1982–83	Chicago	**78**	**3**	**16.8**	.467	**.154**	.730	**2.3**	**1.3**	**.8**	**.1**	**6.3**
1983–84	Indiana	2	0	5.0	.250	–	**1.000**	.5	.0	.0	.0	3.0
Career		129	3	13.9	.463	.154	.749	1.9	1.0	.6	.1	5.4
