= Mark Strickland =

American basketball player and coach

Personal information
- Born: July 14, 1970 (age 56) Atlanta, Georgia, U.S.
- Listed height: 6 ft 9 in (2.06 m)
- Listed weight: 210 lb (95 kg)

Career information
- High school: McNair (Atlanta, Georgia)
- College: Temple (1989–1992)
- NBA draft: 1992: undrafted
- Playing career: 1992–2006
- Position: Small forward / power forward
- Number: 30, 5, 31, 21

Career history
- 1992: Philadelphia Spirit
- 1993: Atlanta Eagles
- 1993–1994: EBBC Den Bosch
- 1994: Atlanta Trojans
- 1994: Atléticos de San Germán
- 1994–1995: Fort Wayne Fury
- 1995: Indiana Pacers
- 1995: Atléticos de San Germán
- 1995–1996: Yakima Sun Kings
- 1996: Atlantic City Seagulls
- 1996–2000: Miami Heat
- 2000–2001: Denver Nuggets
- 2001: New Jersey Nets
- 2001–2002: Atlanta Hawks
- 2002: Gigantes de Carolina
- 2002: Dallas Mavericks
- 2002: Strasbourg IG
- 2002–2003: Zhejiang Wanma Cyclones
- 2003–2005: Jamhour Blue Stars
- 2005: Rockford Lightning
- 2005–2006: Yakima Sun Kings

Career NBA statistics
- Points: 1,281 (4.6 ppg)
- Rebounds: 771 (2.7 rpg)
- Assists: 102 (0.4 apg)
- Stats at NBA.com
- Stats at Basketball Reference

Mark Strickland (born July 14, 1970) is an American former professional basketball player and coach, who had a career in the National Basketball Association (NBA) from 1995 to 2002 and was the head coach of the Oshawa Power of the National Basketball League of Canada. A 6'9" 210 lb (95 kg) forward born in Atlanta, Strickland played college basketball at Temple University, where he also majored in sports management.

As well as playing in the NBA, he also played in the CBA and USBL.
