= Long Island Surf =

American basketball team

- Division: None (1985, 1987–88, 1993–95); Northern (1991–92, 1996–2001)
- League: USBL
- Established: 1985 (1st); 1991 (2nd)
- Folded: 1988 (1st); 2001 (2nd)
- Arena: Stony Brook University Arena
- Location: Long Island, New York
- Team colors: Black, teal, pink

The Long Island Surf were a professional basketball team based in Long Island, New York. They played 14 seasons in the United States Basketball League (USBL).

== History ==
The franchise was established in 1985 as the Long Island Knights, and played in the first USBL season, finishing with a 9–15 record. The team did not participate in the 1986 season but did return for the 1987 edition, ending the regular season as the 4th ranked team and qualifying for the Postseason Festival (the USBL playoffs), during which they reached the semifinals, where they lost to the Rhode Island Gulls. In the 1987 season, female player Nancy Lieberman played for the Long Island Knights. In the 1988 season the Knights ended at the bottom of the table with a 3–27 record. After the season, the franchise was disbanded.

In 1991, a group of 31 Long Island investors coordinated by Ed Krinsky re-established the team under the new name Long Island Surf and a starting budget of a 100,000 US$. In their first season back in the USBL, the Surf ended with a 7–13 record in the Northern Division. Forward Anthony Mason led the league in rebounds at 11.2 per game. In 1992 the Surf finished with the second best record of the division (13–13) and qualified for the Postseason Festival, where they lost to the Philadelphia Spirit in the division finals. In 1993 the divisions were abolished; the Surf ended 4th in the league table with a 14–10 record and qualified for the Postseason Playoffs, where they were eliminated by the Westchester Stallions. Point guard David Cain led the USBL in assists with 9.4 per game.

By 1994, the New York Times reported that the franchise had doubled its value. The team ended the 1994 season with a 13–14 record, progressing to the Postseason Festival quarterfinals where they were eliminated by the Connecticut Skylarks. Surf point guard Jean Prioleau led the league in assists with 10.3 a game. In 1995 the team improved its record to 14–12, but missed the playoffs (only the first three teams qualified); in 1996, ranking 3rd in the re-established Northern Division, the Surf reached the playoffs, where they lost to the Portland Mountain Cats. Former St. John's center Shawnelle Scott led the USBL in rebounding (13.5 per game) playing for the Surf. In 1997 the Surf had a successful season: they ranked 2nd in their division with a 19–7 record, and advanced to the USBL finals after defeating the Connecticut Skyhawks in the quarterfinals and the Atlanta Trojans in the semifinals. The Surf faced the Atlantic City Seagulls in the USBL finals, losing 112–114. In 1998, the Long Island franchise won the Northern Division with an 18–7 record, and again reached the USBL finals after beating the Columbus Cagerz in the second round, and the Connecticut Skyhawks in the Final Four; they lost the finals to the Atlantic City Seagulls for the second consecutive year, 96–100.

In 1999 the Surf finished second in the division behind the Connecticut Skyhawks, and reached the playoff semifinals, where they lost to the Skyhawks, 92–99. The franchise reached the playoffs again in 2000 after finishing 3rd in their division; they lost to the New Jersey ShoreCats, 103–116. The Long Island Surf played their final USBL season in 2001: in their last appearance they made the playoffs and advanced to the semifinals, where they lost to eventual champions Pennsylvania Valleydawgs. The team was then disbanded after the end of the season.

== Season-by-season records ==
Season	GP	Wins	Losses	Pct.	GB	Finish	Head coach
Long Island Knights
1985	24	9	15	.375	9.5	6th USBL	Frank Mulzoff
1987	28	13	15	.467	11	4th USBL	Dean Meminger
1988	30	3	27	.100	18	7th USBL	Jim Murphy
Long Island Surf
1991	20	7	13	.350	8	3rd USBL Northern Division	Bernard Tomlin
1992	26	13	13	.500	8	2nd USBL Northern Division	George T. Johnson
1993	24	14	10	.583	2	4th USBL	George T. Johnson
1994	27	13	14	.482	5	5th USBL	George T. Johnson
1995	26	14	12	.538			George T. Johnson
1996	27	14	13	.519			Cedric Maxwell
1997	26	19	7	.731			Sam Worthen
1998	25	18	7	.720			James Ryans
1999	28	13	15	.464			James Ryans
2000	30	15	15	.500			James Ryans
2001	29	13	16	.448			James Ryans

== Notable players ==
Note: Flags indicate national team eligibility at FIBA-sanctioned events. Players may hold other non-FIBA nationalities not displayed.

Criteria

To appear in this section a player must have either:

- Set a club record or won an individual award while at the club
- Played at least one official international match for their national team at any time
- Played at least one official NBA match at any time.

- (United States) Mark Baker
- (United States) Michael Curry
- (United States) Lloyd Daniels
- (United States) Mark Davis
- (United States) Stewart Granger
- (United States) Adrian Griffin
- (United States) Juaquin Hawkins
- (United States) Geoff Huston
- (United States) Mike James
- (United States) George L. Johnson
- (United States) Shelton Jones
- (United States) Nancy Lieberman
- (United States) Anthony Mason
- (United States) Ron Moore
- (Argentina) Marcelo Nicola
- (United States) Jean Prioleau
- (United States) Michael Ray Richardson
- (United States) LaMont "ShowBoat" Robinson
- (United States) Jim Rowinski
- (United States) Shawnelle Scott
- (United States) Robert Werdann
- (United States) Rob Williams
