= Philadelphia Spirit =

- League: United States Basketball League
- Founded: 1991
- Dissolved: 1992
- History: Philadelphia Spirit (1991-92)
- Arena: Holy Family College Center
- Location: Philadelphia
- Team colors: red, white, blue
- Championships: 1 USBL (1991)
- Division/conference titles: 1991, 1992

The Philadelphia Spirit was a United States Basketball League team that played from 1991 to 1992 at Holy Family University in Northeast Philadelphia.

== History ==
In 1991, they finished first in the league with a 15–5 record. They beat the Miami Tropics in the league's finals, winning the championship. The team was coached by Bill Lange, a New Jersey high school coach, who was named USBL Coach of the Year. In 1992, they again finished first in the league, with a 21–5 record. They played in that year's league finals as well. However, they lost by two points to archrival, the Miami Tropics. They disbanded following that season.

Notable players are Michael Anderson, Tim Legler and Marques Bragg. In January 2023 the players gathered together in a reunion to remember and celebrate the club's first trophy back in 1991.

The club was re-founded in 2015 and it joined ABA.

== Seasons ==
Stagione	League	Name	W	L	%	Place	Play-off	Coach
1991	USBL	Philadelphia Spirit	15	5	75,0	1º	Champions	Bill Lange
1992	USBL	Philadelphia Spirit	21	5	80,8	1º	Finals	Bill Lange

== Rosters ==
=== 1991 season ===
- Michael Anderson, Paul Graham, Rodney Blake, Dallas Comegys, Chris Gardler, David Harris, Tony Costner, Tim Legler, Emanual Davis, Jerome Coles.

Chris Gardler and David Harris played the most games for the team (21).

=== 1992 season ===
- Michael Anderson, Marques Bragg, Tony Costner, Rodney Blake, Tim Legler, Matt Fish, Myron Brown, Dallas Comegys, Roy Marble, George Gilmore.

The team ended the 1992 season with a record of 21 wins and 5 losses, finishing first in the USBL's North Division.
