= Ken Bannister =

American basketball player (born 1960)

Personal information
- Born: April 1, 1960 (age 66) Baltimore, Maryland, U.S.
- Listed height: 6 ft 10 in (2.08 m)
- Listed weight: 235 lb (107 kg)

Career information
- High school: Southwestern (Baltimore, Maryland)
- College: Trinidad State (1979–1981); Indiana State (1981–1982); St. Augustine's (1983–1984)
- NBA draft: 1984: 7th round, 156th overall pick
- Drafted by: New York Knicks
- Playing career: 1984–2000
- Position: Power forward / center
- Number: 1, 51

Career history
- 1984–1985: New York Knicks
- 1985: Long Island Knights
- 1985–1986: New York Knicks
- 1986, 1987: Staten Island Stallions
- 1986–1987: Hapoel Holon
- 1987: Quad City Thunder
- 1987–1988: Mississippi Jets
- 1988: Jersey Shore Bucs
- 1988–1989: Wichita Falls Texans
- 1989: Rockford Lightning
- 1988–1991: Los Angeles Clippers
- 1991, 1992, 1993, 1994, 1996: Miami Tropics / Treasure Coast Tropics
- 1991: Albany Patroons / Capital Region Pontiacs
- 1991–1992, 1992–1993: Halifax Windjammers
- 1993–1994: Tau Cerámica
- 1994–1996: Zaragoza
- 1996: Joventut Badalona
- 1996–1997: Fuenlabrada
- 1997: Atléticos de San Germán
- 1997: Estudiantes de Olavarría
- 1998: Titanes de Morovis
- 1998–1999: Franca
- 1999–2000: Ipiranga Santa Catarina

Career highlights
- USBL champion (1993); USBL Player of the Year (1993); USBL Top Scorer (1993)

Career NBA statistics
- Points: 1,501
- Rebounds: 893
- Assists: 111
- Stats at NBA.com
- Stats at Basketball Reference

Kenneth Darnell Bannister (born April 1, 1960) is an American former professional basketball player, from Baltimore, Maryland. At 6' 9" tall he was a power forward-center.

== College career ==
Bannister played college basketball at Trinidad State College, Indiana State University, and Saint Augustine's College.

== Professional career ==
Bannister was selected by the New York Knicks, in the 7th round (156th overall), of the 1984 NBA draft. Bannister played in 5 NBA seasons. He played for the Knicks, from 1984 to 1986, and the Los Angeles Clippers, from 1988 to 1991. In his NBA career, Bannister played in 253 games, and scored a total of 1,501 points. His best season as a professional came during the 1985-86 NBA season, as a member of the Knicks, appearing in 70 games, and averaging 8.6 points per game.

During the 1986–87 season, he played in Israel, with Hapoel Holon.

Bannister served as player-coach for the Treasure Coast Tropics of the United States Basketball League (USBL) in 1996.

== Career statistics ==
Legend
GP	Games played	GS	Games started	MPG	Minutes per game
FG%	Field goal percentage	3P%	3-point field goal percentage	FT%	Free throw percentage
RPG	Rebounds per game	APG	Assists per game	SPG	Steals per game
BPG	Blocks per game	PPG	Points per game	**Bold**	Career high

=== NBA ===
==== Regular season ====
Year	Team	GP	GS	MPG	FG%	3P%	FT%	RPG	APG	SPG	BPG	PPG
1984–85	New York	**75**	**50**	18.7	.470	–	.474	4.4	.5	.5	**.5**	6.8
1985–86	New York	70	15	**20.1**	.491	.000	.526	**4.6**	**.6**	.6	.3	**8.6**
1988–89	L.A. Clippers	9	2	14.4	**.611**	.000	**.566**	3.7	.3	**.8**	.2	8.2
1989–90	L.A. Clippers	52	1	11.3	.478	.000	.473	2.2	.3	.3	.1	4.0
1990–91	L.A. Clippers	47	3	7.2	.531	.000	.385	2.0	.2	.1	.1	2.4
Career		253	71	15.3	.488	.000	.492	3.5	.4	.4	.3	5.9
