= LaMont "ShowBoat" Robinson =

American basketball player (born 1961)

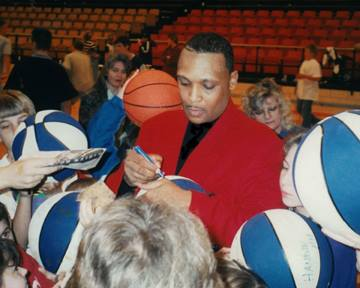

Personal information
- Born: July 23, 1961 (age 65) Warrensville Heights, Ohio, U.S.
- Listed height: 6 ft 3 in (1.91 m)
- Listed weight: 200 lb (91 kg)

Career information
- High school: Warrensville Heights (Warrensville Heights, Ohio); Jeannette (Jeannette, Pennsylvania)
- College: Kankakee CC (1981–1982); Central State (1985–1986)
- Playing career: 1987–Present
- Position: Shooting guard
- Number: 31, 36

Career history
- 1987–1989: Denmark
- 1988–1989: USBL
- 1989–1996: Meadowlark Lemon Harlem All-Stars
- 1989–1990: Harlem Globetrotters, Washington Generals
- 1995–2011: Harlem Road Kings
- 2010-present: Harlem Clowns

LaMont "ShowBoat" Robinson (born July 23, 1961) is an American former professional basketball player and businessman. Robinson has been nominated twice to the Naismith Memorial Basketball Hall of Fame and he is the founder and owner of the Harlem Clowns as well as the National Rhythm & Blues Music Hall of Fame.

== Early life ==
Robinson grew up in Warrensville Heights, Ohio. He played for Warrensville Heights High School from 1976 to 1979, then moved to Jeannette, Pennsylvania and played his senior year 1979–1980 season at Jeannette High School. He then played for Central State University in Wilberforce, Ohio.

== Basketball ==
Robinson went on to play basketball professionally in Copenhagen, Denmark. He also played for the Long Island Knights of the USBL in 1988 and then went to veteran training camp with the Columbus Horizon of the CBA before traveling to Russia in 1989 with the Harlem Globetrotters and Washington Generals Tour. From 1995 to 2010, Robinson was a member of the Harlem Road Kings, before founding the Harlem Clowns, where he continues to serve as the owner/player.

Robinson plays with “ShowBoat Robinson’s Fabulous Harlem Clowns". 2017 was Robinson's 31st year as a player and 22nd year as an owner and operator of a comedy basketball team. Furthermore, his basketball camps "ShowBoat" Robinson All-American Basketball Camp and his Say No to Drugs and Yes to Life and Family and Education(SDYLFE) program that he has been taking into schools around the world since 1995.

On November 1, 2001, Robinson sent his Harlem Road Kings uniform to the Naismith Memorial Basketball Hall of Fame to be displayed as an exhibit.

== Music ==
In 2010, Robinson decided to pursue the idea of building a rhythm and blues museum that would include everything from radio personalities and owners of record companies to hip-hop and gospel music. Robinson founded the National Rhythm & Blues Hall of Fame later that year and the first induction ceremony was held on August 17, 2013.

Since 2013, Robinson has held induction ceremonies every year that have included Michael Jackson, Whitney Houston, Morgan Freeman, Aretha Franklin and more. Ties with inductees and their families have been strong and artifacts for the museum have been donated. The National Rhythm & Blues Hall of Fame has honored and inducted more than 170 artists since 2013.
