= Kevin Mackey =

American basketball coach (1946–2025)

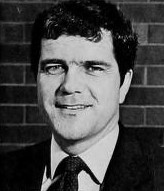
- Mackey in 1988

Biographical details
- Born: August 21, 1946; Boston, Massachusetts, U.S.
- Died: November 11, 2025 (aged 79)

Playing career
- 1964–1967: Saint Anselm

Coaching career (HC unless noted)
- 1977–1983: Boston College (assistant)
- 1983–1990: Cleveland State
- 1991: Miami Tropics
- 1997–1999: Atlantic City Seagulls
- 1999–2000: Mansfield Hawks

Head coaching record
- Overall: 142–69 (.673)

Accomplishments and honors

Championships
- 2 AMCU-8 regular season (1985, 1986); AMCU-8 tournament (1986); 3 USBL (1997–1999); IBA (1999)

Awards
- AMCU-8 Coach of the Year (1985, 1986); USBL Coach of the Year (1997, 1999); IBA Coach of the Year (1999)

Kevin Mackey (August 21, 1946 – November 11, 2025) was an American basketball coach who was the head coach of men's basketball at Cleveland State University. His CSU Vikings upset the Indiana Hoosiers and the Saint Joseph's Hawks to make the Sweet 16 in the 1986 NCAA Division I men's basketball tournament. He is also known for recruiting future NBA player Manute Bol. In 2024 Mackey was inducted into the American Basketball Hall of Fame.

== Early coaching career ==
Mackey was a successful high school coach at the former Don Bosco Technical High School in Boston, winning the 1976 state championship and three consecutive Class A Catholic championships. From 1977 to 1983, he served as an assistant coach at Boston College under Tom Davis and Gary Williams in the early days of the Big East Conference. He was well known as a top recruiter, and was well known for landing inner-city prospects.

== Collegiate and pro career ==
=== Cleveland State ===
Mackey coached at Cleveland State University from 1983 to 1990 and posted a record of 144 wins and 67 losses. His teams made one NCAA and two National Invitation Tournament appearances and averaged more than 20 wins per season. His best team was the 1985-86 unit, which won a school-record 29 games and advanced all the way to the Sweet 16—becoming the first #14 seed to advance that far. It was also the first postseason bid of any sort in the program's 57-year history. Before his first-round game against Indiana, he went up to Bobby Knight saying, "Take it easy on me, big guy." Knight exploded, knowing Cleveland State would likely give the Hoosiers all they could handle with its "run n' stun" style. He became a celebrity in Northeast Ohio, with the local press dubbing him "the King of Cleveland." Cleveland State used the money from the 1986 NCAA run to build what is now the Wolstein Center.

Earlier in 1985, Mackey invited Manute Bol to Cleveland after seeing him in action with a Sudanese team that was touring the United States. However, Bol did not speak or write English very well at the time. Despite spending months at ELS Language Centers on the Case Western Reserve University campus, Bol was unable to improve his English well enough to enroll at Cleveland State. Five years later, Cleveland State was placed on two years' probation for providing improper financial assistance to Bol and two other African players. They were also banned from Mid-Continent conference play for the duration of the probation.

Even with the probation, Mackey still reckoned as a rising star in the collegiate ranks. Cleveland State knew this, and signed him to a two-year, $300,000 contract in July 1990 (US$739,302 in 2025 dollars). However, on July 13—only a few days after he signed his contract—Cleveland police, acting on a tip, pulled him over after he drove left of center. He was arrested for driving under the influence and having an open container. It subsequently emerged that he'd sprayed his mouth with a breath spray before taking a Breathalyzer test at the police station. Since breath spray can alter the results of Breathalyzer tests, police took a urine sample, which revealed traces of cocaine.

The Wednesday after his arrest, Mackey held a press conference in which he acknowledged a long-running problem with substance abuse. He also announced that he planned to go into rehab, and his lawyer asked Cleveland State to let him go on a leave of absence so he could complete it. However, Cleveland State refused to do so and fired him, with the school president saying Mackey had effectively "fired himself." Mackey subsequently pleaded no contest and in lieu of prosecution, he was ordered confined to a rehabilitation center for 60 days.

In 2009, Mackey told the New York Times that at the time of his arrest, he'd been an alcoholic for many years and had begun using cocaine shortly after the 1986 NCAA Tournament. He said that he thought he was able to control it, and did not realize how serious the problem was until his arrest. However, he has remained sober for over 20 years. Many of Mackey's former players later said that they learned from Mackey's experience and how it humbled him. He remains very much in the good graces of Cleveland State fans. During the 20-year reunion of the 1986 Cinderella run, Mackey received a standing ovation.

=== Pro career ===
Mackey spent 60 days at a rehab center run by John Lucas, and then went on to a successful career in minor league basketball. In 1991, he was a mid-season replacement coach for the Miami Tropics of the United States Basketball League and led the team to the title game. In 1996, he coached the Portland (Maine) Mountain Cats to the Final Four of the USBL. Following his stint with the Mountain Cats, Mackey captured three consecutive USBL Championships from 1997 to 1999, with the Atlantic City Seagulls, something no other coach in the USBL has done.

He also coached Trenton New Jersey of the I.B.C., Jacksonville of the USBL and was National Director of Scouting for Hoops Global and Director of Player Personnel for Pro Basketball USA. In 1999, he again surfaced as a head coach, this time in professional basketball where he led the Mansfield Hawks to the International Basketball Association championship in his only season.

== Later life and death ==
In 2004, Mackey was hired as a scout for the Indiana Pacers of the NBA. Pacers basketball operations president Larry Bird, whose early days with the Boston Celtics coincided with Mackey's tenure at Boston College, had long admired Mackey. He'd originally gotten in touch with Mackey in 2002 during his abortive bid for what became the Charlotte Bobcats. Mackey retired at age 74 following the 2020–21 NBA season after working for 18 years as a Pacers scout.

Mackey died on November 11, 2025, at the age of 79.

== Head coaching record ==
Record table
Season	Team	Overall	Conference	Standing	Postseason
Cleveland State (AMCU-8) (1983–1990)
1983–84	Cleveland State	14–16	4–10	7th	
1984–85	Cleveland State	21–8	11–3	1st	
1985–86	Cleveland State	29–4	13–1	1st	NCAA, Sweet Sixteen
1986–87	Cleveland State	25–8	10–4	2nd	NIT, Second round
1987–88	Cleveland State	22–8	11–3	2nd	NIT, Second round
1988–89	Cleveland State	16–12	N/A	N/A	
1989–90	Cleveland State	15–13	N/A	N/A	
Cleveland State:		142–69	49–21		
Total:		142–69			
National champion Postseason invitational champion Conference regular season champion Conference regular season and conference tournament champion Division regular season champion Division regular season and conference tournament champion Conference tournament champion
