= Jim Bostic =

American basketball player

Personal information
- Born: January 8, 1953 (age 73) Yonkers, New York
- Listed height: 6 ft 7 in (2.01 m)
- Listed weight: 225 lb (102 kg)

Career information
- High school: Gorton (Yonkers, New York)
- College: New Mexico State (1972–1975)
- NBA draft: 1975: 8th round, 139th overall pick
- Drafted by: Kansas City Kings
- Playing career: 1976–1981
- Position: Forward
- Number: 32

Career history
- 1976–1978: Brooklyn Pros / Wilkes-Barre Barons
- 1978: Detroit Pistons
- 1978–1979: Jersey Shore Bullets
- 1979–1980: Lancaster Red Roses
- 1980–1981: Philadelphia Kings

Career highlights
- 3× All-EBA/CBA First Team (1977–1979); CBA rebounding leader (1980)
- Stats at NBA.com
- Stats at Basketball Reference

James Bostic (born January 8, 1953) is a retired American basketball player.

Born in Yonkers, New York, he played in college for New Mexico State University.

He was selected by the Kansas City Kings in the 8th round (139th pick overall) of the 1975 NBA draft.

He was under contract with the Kings (September–October 1975) and San Antonio Spurs (July–October 1977), but did not play in the NBA for these teams.

He played for the Detroit Pistons (1977–78) in the NBA for four games.

Bostic played in the Eastern Basketball Association (EBA) / Continental Basketball Association (CBA) for the Brooklyn Pros / Wilkes-Barre Barons, Jersey Shore Bullets, Lancaster Red Roses and Philadelphia Kings from 1976 to 1981. He was selected to the All-EBA/CBA First Team from 1977 to 1979.

== Career statistics ==
Legend
GP	Games played	GS	Games started	MPG	Minutes per game
FG%	Field goal percentage	3P%	3-point field goal percentage	FT%	Free throw percentage
RPG	Rebounds per game	APG	Assists per game	SPG	Steals per game
BPG	Blocks per game	PPG	Points per game	**Bold**	Career high

=== NBA ===
==== Regular season ====
Year	Team	GP	MPG	FG%	FT%	RPG	APG	SPG	BPG	PPG
1977–78	Detroit	4	12.0	.545	.400	4.0	.8	.0	.0	6.5
