= Pennsylvania ValleyDawgs =

- League: USBL 1999–2006
- Founded: 1999
- History: Pennsylvania ValleyDawgs; 1999–2006
- Arena: William Allen High School gymnasium
- Location: Whitehall Township, Pennsylvania, U.S.
- Team colors: navy blue, white, gold
- Head coach: Darryl Dawkins
- Championships: 2 (2001, 2004)

The Pennsylvania ValleyDawgs were a United States Basketball League team located in Whitehall Township, Pennsylvania in the Lehigh Valley region of eastern Pennsylvania. It operated from 1999 to 2006.

== History ==
On May 24, 2001, former Minnesota Vikings receiver Randy Moss suited up for one game with the ValleyDawgs, scoring seven points in a 113-112 victory over the Long Island Surf.

In 2006, former Survivor contestant Gervase Peterson became a co-owner of the team. However later that year, after encountering financial difficulties, the team folded and was replaced by the Albany Patroons.

The ValleyDawgs won the USBL championship in 2004. In 2003, the team won the USBL's Eastern Division Finals but lost in the USBL Championship Series.

== Home court ==
In earlier years, the team played at Stabler Arena at Lehigh University in Bethlehem. in later years they played at Dieruff High School and William Allen High School gymnasium in Center City Allentown.

== Head coach ==
The head coach of the ValleyDawgs was Darryl Dawkins, a former Philadelphia 76ers star who, during his NBA career, was known for his backboard-breaking slam dunks and for amassing the most career fouls in NBA history.

== Seasons ==
Stagione	League	Name	W	L	%	Place	Play-off	Coach
1999	USBL	Pennsylvania ValleyDawgs	18	9	66,7	3º	Semifinals	Darryl Dawkins
2000	USBL	Pennsylvania ValleyDawgs	20	10	66,7	1º	Quarter finals	Darryl Dawkins
2001	USBL	Pennsylvania ValleyDawgs	18	12	60,0	2º	Champions	Darryl Dawkins
2002	USBL	Pennsylvania ValleyDawgs	14	16	46,7	3º	Quarter finals	Darryl Dawkins
2003	USBL	Pennsylvania ValleyDawgs	23	7	76,7	1º	Final	Darryl Dawkins
2004	USBL	Pennsylvania ValleyDawgs	20	10	60,0	1º	Champions	Darryl Dawkins
2005	USBL	Pennsylvania ValleyDawgs	12	18	40,0	3º	Quarter finals	Darryl Dawkins
2006	USBL	Pennsylvania ValleyDawgs	2	27	6,9	3º	-	Darryl Dawkins; Derrick Rowland
