= Springfield Fame =

- League: United States Basketball League
- Founded: 1985
- Dissolved: 1986
- Arena: Springfield Civic Center
- Location: Springfield, Massachusetts
- Championships: 1 1985 (no playoffs)

The Springfield Fame were a men's spring-professional basketball team in the United States Basketball League from Springfield, Massachusetts, the hometown of the Naismith Memorial Basketball Hall of Fame, which gave the inspiration of the team name.

== History ==
The Springfield Fame were founded in 1985. In their inaugural season, they finished with a record of 19-6 and were the first USBL Champions. The league did not add a playoff system until the 1987 season. In their second season, the Fame made national headlines by signing 27-year-old women's basketball legend Nancy Lieberman. Lieberman thus became the first female basketball player to play regular season minutes in a men's pro league. They would finish second with a 23–10 record and 0.5 game behind the Tampa Bay Flash. The Fame would fold following the 1986 season.

== Season-by-season records ==
Year	GP	W	L	Win %	GB	Head coach
1985	25	19	6	.760	..	Gerald Oliver
1986	33	23	10	.697	0.5	Henry Bibby
Totals	58	42	16	.724	–	–

== Honours ==
USBL Player of the Year

Season	Player
1985	Tracy Jackson

USBL Coach of the Year

Season	Coach	W	L
1985	Gerald Oliver	19	6
1986	Henry Bibby	23	10

All-USBL Teams

First Team

Season	Player	Position
1985	Tracy Jackson	
1986	Billy Goodwin	

- Tracy Jackson (1985)
- Billy Goodwin (1986)

Second Team

Season	Player	Position
1985	Larry Lawrence	
1985	Michael Adams	Point Guard
1986	Michael Adams	Point Guard
1986	Jerome Henderson	Center/Power Forward

- Larry Lawrence (1985)
- Michael Adams (1985 and 1986)
- Jerome Henderson (1986)

USBL All-Rookie Team

Season	Player	Position
1985	Andre Goode	
1985	Michael Adams	
1986	Dominic Pressley	

- Andre Goode (1985)
- Michael Adams (1985)
- Dominic Pressley (1986)

USBL All-Defensive Team

- Michael Adams (1985 and 1986)
- Jerome Henderson (1986)
