= Pepperdine Waves men's basketball statistical leaders =

The Pepperdine Waves men's basketball statistical leaders are individual statistical leaders of the Pepperdine Waves men's basketball program in various categories, including points, assists, blocks, rebounds, and steals. Within those areas, the lists identify single-game, single-season, and career leaders. The Waves represent Pepperdine University in the NCAA's West Coast Conference.

Pepperdine began competing in intercollegiate basketball in 1938. However, the school's record book does not generally list records from before the 1950s, as records from before this period are often incomplete and inconsistent. Since scoring was much lower in this era, and teams played much fewer games during a typical season, it is likely that few or no players from this era would appear on these lists anyway.

The NCAA did not officially record assists as a stat until the 1983–84 season, and blocks and steals until the 1985–86 season, but Pepperdine's record books includes players in these stats before these seasons. These lists are updated through the end of the 2020–21 season.

== Scoring ==
Career
Rk	Player	Points	Seasons
1	Colbey Ross	2,236	2017–18 2018–19 2019–20 2020–21
2	Stacy Davis	1,786	2012–13 2013–14 2014–15 2015–16
3	Dane Suttle	1,701	1979–80 1980–81 1981–82 1982–83
4	Dana Jones	1,677	1990–91 1991–92 1992–93 1993–94
5	Eric White	1,672	1983–84 1984–85 1985–86 1986–87
6	Geoff Lear	1,644	1988–89 1989–90 1990–91 1991–92
7	Craig Davis	1,619	1986–87 1987–88 1988–89 1989–90
8	Tom Lewis	1,575	1987–88 1988–89 1989–90
9	Levy Middlebrooks	1,548	1984–85 1985–86 1986–87 1987–88
10	Dexter Howard	1,546	1986–87 1987–88 1988–89 1989–90

Season
Rk	Player	Points	Season
1	Bird Averitt	848	1972–73
2	Bird Averitt	693	1971–72
3	Tom Lewis	687	1987–88
4	Brandon Armstrong	684	2000–01
5	Dane Suttle	679	1982–83
6	Lamond Murray Jr.	662	2016–17
7	Colbey Ross	659	2018–19
8	Colbey Ross	656	2019–20
9	Stefan Todorovic	640	2024–25
10	Doug Christie	606	1991–92

Single game
Rk	Player	Points	Season	Opponent
1	Bird Averitt	57	1972–73	Nevada
2	Bird Averitt	56	1972–73	Nevada
3	Bird Averitt	49	1972–73	Drury College
4	Bird Averitt	47	1972–73	Saint Mary's
5	Bird Averitt	46	1972–73	Seattle
6	Bob Morris	44	1952–53	Chico State
7	Bird Averitt	43	1972–73	Doane College
	Colbey Ross	43	2019–20	Saint Mary's
9	Bird Averitt	41	1972–73	Santa Clara
	Bird Averitt	41	1972–73	Loyola Marymount
	Dane Suttle	41	1982–83	Loyola Marymount
	Brandon Armstrong	41	2000–01	Charlotte
	Lamond Murray Jr.	41	2016–17	Pacific

== Rebounds ==
Career
Rk	Player	Rebounds	Seasons
1	Dana Jones	1,031	1990–91 1991–92 1992–93 1993–94
2	Stacy Davis	994	2012–13 2013–14 2014–15 2015–16
3	Levy Middlebrooks	972	1984–85 1985–86 1986–87 1987–88
4	Geoff Lear	937	1988–89 1989–90 1990–91 1991–92
5	Ollie Matson	881	1974–75 1975–76 1976–77 1978–79
6	Dick Skophammer	874	1972–73 1973–74 1974–75 1975–76
7	Sterling Forbes	869	1957–58 1958–59 1959–60
8	Harry Dinnel	867	1960–61 1961–62 1962–63
9	Ray Ellis	848	1975–76 1976–77 1977–78 1978–79
10	Kelvin Gibbs	846	1997–98 1998–99 1999–00 2000–01

Season
Rk	Player	Rebounds	Season
1	Hugh Faulkner	434	1950–51
2	Roland Betts	372	1964–65
3	Roland Betts	368	1963–64
4	Larry Dugan	341	1954–55
5	Bob Warlick	326	1962–63
	Michael Ajayi	326	2023–24
7	Sterling Forbes	325	1959–60
8	Levy Middlebrooks	321	1987–88
9	Geoff Lear	305	1990–91
10	Harry Dinnel	303	1960–61

Single game
Rk	Player	Rebounds	Season	Opponent
1	Larry Dugan	36	1954–55	UC Santa Barbara
2	Levy Middlebrooks	25	1987–88	LMU
3	Dick Skophammer	24	1973–74	Portland
	Dick Skophammer	24	1975–76	Neb.-Omaha
5	Glen McGowan	22	2004–05	Colorado State
6	Marcos Leite	21	1973–74	Nevada
7	Bryan Hill	21	1996–97	Portland
8	Marcos Leite	20	1974–75	Santa Clara
9	Billy Williams	19	1972–73	Pittsburgh
	Ray Ellis	19	1976–77	Saint Mary's
	Anthony Frederick	19	1984–85	Santa Clara

== Assists ==
Career
Rk	Player	Assists	Seasons
1	Colbey Ross	854	2017–18 2018–19 2019–20 2020–21
2	Jeremy Major	494	2013–14 2014–15 2015–16 2016–17
3	Mark Wilson	450	1980–81 1981–82 1982–83 1983–84
4	Jon Korfas	438	1983–84 1984–85 1985–86
5	Amadi Udenyi	426	2013–14 2014–15 2015–16 2016–17 2017–18
6	Doug Christie	395	1989–90 1990–91 1991–92
7	Tezale Archie	379	1995–96 1996–97 1997–98 1998–99 1999–00
8	Dane Suttle	372	1979–80 1980–81 1981–82 1982–83
9	Ricardo Brown	365	1978–79 1979–80
10	Damin Lopez	363	1989–90 1990–91 1991–92 1992–93 1993–94

Season
Rk	Player	Assists	Season
1	Moe Odum	264	2024–25
2	Colbey Ross	239	2018–19
3	Colbey Ross	229	2019–20
4	Tezale Archie	208	1999–00
5	Colbey Ross	207	2020–21
6	Bryan Parker	203	1992–93
7	Ricardo Brown	197	1978–79
8	Jon Korfas	187	1985–86
9	Colbey Ross	179	2017–18
10	Jon Korfas	177	1984–85

Single game
Rk	Player	Assists	Season	Opponent
1	Bryan Parker	17	1992–93	Oral Roberts
2	Donny Moore	16	1987–88	Loyola Marymount
3	Dwayne Polee	15	1984–85	Abilene Christian
4	Ricardo Brown	14	1978–79	Portland State
	Jon Korfas	14	1985–86	Loyola Marymount
	Tezale Archie	14	1999–00	Oklahoma State
	Marvin Lea	14	2004–05	Siena
8	Bird Averitt	13	1972–73	Loyola Marymount
	Ricardo Brown	13	1979–80	Santa Clara
	Jon Korfas	13	1985–86	Loyola Marymount
	Donny Moore	13	1987–88	Portland
	Donny Moore	13	1987–88	Gonzaga
	Donny Moore	13	1987–88	Loyola Marymount
	Shann Ferch	13	1989–90	Tenn.-Chattanooga
	Colbey Ross	13	2018–19	Alabama A&M
	Colbey Ross	13	2020–21	Longwood
	Moe Odum	13	2024–25	Santa Clara
	Anto Balian	13	2026–27	West Coast Baptist

== Steals ==
Career
Rk	Player	Steals	Seasons
1	Dana Jones	211	1990–91 1991–92 1992–93 1993–94
2	Craig Davis	172	1986–87 1987–88 1988–89 1989–90
3	Doug Christie	168	1989–90 1990–91 1991–92
4	Lorne Jackson	159	2008–09 2009–10 2010–11 2012–13
5	Jeremy Major	153	2013–14 2014–15 2015–16 2016–17
6	Mychel Thompson	145	2007–08 2008–09 2009–10 2010–11
7	Kelvin Gibbs	141	1997–98 1998–99 1999–00 2000–01
8	Tezale Archie	140	1995–96 1996–97 1997–98 1998–99 1999–00
9	Colbey Ross	139	2017–18 2018–19 2019–20 2020–21
10	Mark Wilson	135	1980–81 1981–82 1982–83 1983–84

Season
Rk	Player	Steals	Season
1	Michael Knight	87	1977–78
2	Dana Jones	75	1993–94
3	Tezale Archie	73	1999–00
4	Bryan Parker	71	1992–93
5	Rico Tucker	65	2007–08
6	Brandon Armstrong	64	1999–00
7	Doug Christie	62	1990–91
	Doug Christie	62	1991–92
	Marvin Lea	62	2006–07
10	Ricardo Brown	60	1978–79

Single game
Rk	Player	Steals	Season	Opponent
1	Dana Jones	9	1993–94	San Francisco
2	Michael Knight	8	1977–78	LMU
3	Michael Knight	7	1977–78	UC Riverside
	Michael Knight	7	1977–78	Santa Clara
5	Michael Knight	6	1977–78	UNLV
	Doug Hopkins	6	1977–78	UC Riverside
	Bill Sadler	6	1981–82	Northland
	Dwayne Polee	6	1983–84	Abilene Christian
	Mark Wilson	6	1983–84	Saint Mary's
	Craig Davis	6	1987–88	Loyola Marymount
	Doug Christie	6	1990–91	San Diego
	Jelani Gardner	6	1998–99	Long Beach St.
	Brandon Armstrong	6	1999–00	Indiana
	Kessler Edwards	6	2018–19	Gonzaga

== Blocks ==
Career
Rk	Player	Blocks	Seasons
1	Cedric Suitt	182	1998–99 1999–00 2000–01 2001–02
2	Geoff Lear	152	1988–89 1989–90 1990–91 1991–92
3	Anthony Frederick	145	1984–85 1985–86
4	Victor Anger	138	1980–81 1981–82 1982–83 1983–84
5	Kessler Edwards	127	2018–19 2019–20 2020–21
6	Jarrad Henry	120	2004–05 2005–06 2006–07 2007–08
7	Dana Jones	118	1990–91 1991–92 1992–93 1993–94
8	Casey Crawford	104	1986–87 1987–88 1988–89
9	Orlando Phillips	98	1981–82 1982–83
10	Dexter Howard	95	1986–87 1987–88 1988–89 1989–90

Season
Rk	Player	Blocks	Season
1	Cedric Suitt	96	2001–02
2	Anthony Frederick	82	1984–85
3	Brendan Lane	73	2013–14
4	Jarrad Henry	68	2006–07
5	Malcolm Thomas	64	2007–08
6	Anthony Frederick	63	1985–86
7	Geoff Lear	60	1990–91
	Kessler Edwards	60	2019–20
9	Victor Anger	56	1983–84
10	Boubacar Coulibaly	54	2024–25

Single game
Rk	Player	Blocks	Season	Opponent
1	Jarrad Henry	11	2006–07	Portland
2	Cedric Suitt	10	2001–02	San Diego
3	Anthony Frederick	9	1984–85	Santa Clara
4	Anthony Frederick	8	1984–85	Hawaii Pacific
	Cedric Suitt	8	2001–02	Saint Mary's
	Russell Hicks	8	2004–05	Portland
7	Anthony Frederick	7	1984–85	Gonzaga
	Brendan Lane	7	2013–14	S.D. Christian
9	Orlando Phillips	6	1982–83	So. Calif. Coll.
	Victor Anger	6	1982–83	Seattle Pacific
	Anthony Frederick	6	1985–86	Portland
	Geoff Lear	6	1990–91	Saint Mary's
	Dana Jones	6	1993–94	Santa Clara
	Gavin van der Putten	6	1995–96	CSUN
	Cedric Suitt	6	2000–01	Santa Clara
	Malcolm Thomas	6	2007–08	San Diego
	Brendan Lane	6	2013–14	San Jose State
	Brendan Lane	6	2013–14	Saint Mary's
	Kessler Edwards	6	2019–20	San Francisco
