= 1985–86 Pepperdine Waves men's basketball team =

American college basketball season

1985–86 Pepperdine Waves men's basketball

WCAC champions

NCAA tournament
- Conference: West Coast Athletic Conference
- Record: 25–5 (13–1 WCAC)
- Head coach: Jim Harrick (7th season)
- Home arena: Firestone Fieldhouse

1985–86 West Coast Athletic Conference men's basketball standings
	Conf.				Overall
Team	W		L	PCT	W		L	PCT
Pepperdine	13	–	1	.929	25	–	5	.833
Loyola Marymount	10	–	4	.714	19	–	11	.633
San Diego	9	–	5	.643	19	–	9	.679
Gonzaga	8	–	6	.571	15	–	13	.536
Santa Clara	7	–	7	.500	12	–	16	.429
Portland	4	–	10	.286	13	–	15	.464
Saint Mary's	3	–	11	.214	10	–	17	.370
San Francisco	2	–	12	.143	7	–	21	.250
Rankings from AP Poll

The 1985–86 Pepperdine Waves men's basketball team represented Pepperdine University in the 1985–86 NCAA Division I men's basketball season. The team was led by head coach Jim Harrick. The Waves played their home games at the Firestone Fieldhouse and were members of the West Coast Athletic Conference. They finished the season 25–5, 13–1 in WCAC play to win the regular season conference title by a 2-game margin to receive an automatic bid to the NCAA tournament. In the opening round, the Waves fell to No. 5 seed Maryland, 69–64.

== Roster ==
1985–86 Pepperdine Waves men's basketball team
Players
Coaches

Pos.	#	Name	Height	Weight	Year	Previous school	Hometown
G	5	Grant Gondrezick	6 ft 5 in (1.96 m)	195 lb (88 kg)	RS Sr	Boulder HS	Boulder, Colorado
G	11	Jon Korfas	5 ft 11 in (1.8 m)	165 lb (75 kg)	Sr	San Marcos HS	Santa Barbara, California
G/F	32	Dwayne Polee	6 ft 5 in (1.96 m)	175 lb (79 kg)	Sr	UNLV	Los Angeles, California
F	34	Eric White	6 ft 8 in (2.03 m)	—	Jr	Sacred Heart Cathedral Preparatory	San Francisco, California
F	44	Anthony Frederick	6 ft 7 in (2.01 m)	200 lb (91 kg)	Sr	Santa Monica College	Los Angeles, California
F	50	Levy Middlebrooks	6 ft 7 in (2.01 m)	235 lb (107 kg)	So	St. Ignatius College Preparatory	San Francisco, California

Head coach

- Jim Harrick (Morris Harvey College)

Assistant coach(es)

Legend

- (C) Team captain
- (S) Suspended
- (I) Ineligible
- (W) Walk-on
- Injured
- Current redshirt

== Schedule and results ==
Date time, TV	Rank^{#}	Opponent^{#}	Result	Record	Site (attendance) city, state
Non-conference regular season
Nov 22, 1985*		vs. No. 5 Kansas; Preseason NIT	L 61–67	0–1	McNichols Sports Arena; Denver, Colorado
Nov 26, 1985*		Washington State	W 84–76	1–1	Firestone Fieldhouse; Malibu, California
Nov 27, 1985*		St. Mary's (TX)	W 69–60	2–1	Firestone Fieldhouse; Malibu, California
Dec 2, 1985*		Nevada	W 100–69	3–1	Firestone Fieldhouse; Malibu, California
Dec 7, 1985*		UC Irvine	W 81–72	4–1	Firestone Fieldhouse; Malibu, California
Dec 13, 1985*		vs. Western Illinois	W 85–67	5–1	Marriott Center; Provo, Utah
Dec 14, 1985*		at Brigham Young	W 83–73	6–1	Marriott Center; Provo, Utah
Dec 20, 1985*		vs. Southern Methodist	W 75–68	7–1	Rupp Arena; Lexington, Kentucky
Dec 21, 1985*		at No. 13 Kentucky	L 56–88	7–2	Rupp Arena; Lexington, Kentucky
Dec 23, 1985*		at Evansville	W 62–61	8–2	Roberts Municipal Stadium; Evansville, Indiana
Dec 28, 1985*		Cal State Fullerton	W 67–64	9–2	Firestone Fieldhouse; Malibu, California
Dec 30, 1985*		Robert Morris	W 84–59	10–2	Firestone Fieldhouse; Malibu, California
Jan 4, 1986*		Northern Iowa	W 94–86	11–2	Firestone Fieldhouse; Malibu, California
Jan 7, 1986*		U.S. International	W 129–94	12–2	Firestone Fieldhouse; Malibu, California
Jan 9, 1986*		at DePaul	L 57–70	12–3	Rosemont Horizon; Rosemont, Illinois
WCAC Regular Season
Jan 16, 1986		at Gonzaga	W 79–67	13–3 (1–0)	The Kennel; Spokane, Washington
Jan 18, 1986		at Portland	W 60–55	14–3 (2–0)	Chiles Center; Portland, Oregon
Jan 24, 1986		San Francisco	W 78–66	15–3 (3–0)	Firestone Fieldhouse; Malibu, California
Jan 25, 1986		Santa Clara	W 64–60	16–3 (4–0)	Firestone Fieldhouse; Malibu, California
Jan 30, 1986		at San Diego	L 64–69	16–4 (4–1)	USD Sports Center; San Diego, California
Feb 1, 1986		at Saint Mary's	W 88–67	17–4 (5–1)	McKeon Pavilion; Moraga, California
Feb 7, 1986		Saint Mary's	W 105–64	18–4 (6–1)	Firestone Fieldhouse; Malibu, California
Feb 8, 1986		San Diego	W 61–60	19–4 (7–1)	Firestone Fieldhouse; Malibu, California
Feb 15, 1986		at Loyola Marymount	W 79–64	20–4 (8–1)	Gersten Pavilion; Los Angeles, California
Feb 21, 1986		Portland	W 80–61	21–4 (9–1)	Firestone Fieldhouse; Malibu, California
Feb 22, 1986		Gonzaga	W 87–64	22–4 (10–1)	Firestone Fieldhouse; Malibu, California
Feb 28, 1986		at Santa Clara	W 56–51	23–4 (11–1)	Leavey Center; Santa Clara, California
Mar 1, 1986		at San Francisco	W 85–64	24–4 (12–1)	War Memorial Gymnasium; San Francisco, California
Mar 5, 1986		Loyola Marymount	W 87–82	25–4 (13–1)	Firestone Fieldhouse; Malibu, California
NCAA Tournament
Mar 14, 1986*	(12 W)	vs. (5 W) Maryland; First Round	L 64–69	25–5	Long Beach Arena; Long Beach, California
*Non-conference game. ^{#}Rankings from AP Poll. (#) Tournament seedings in parentheses. W=West.

== Awards and honors ==
- Dwayne Polee – WCAC Player of the Year (2x)
- Jim Harrick – WCAC Coach of the Year
