= 1984–85 Pepperdine Waves men's basketball team =

American college basketball season

1984–85 Pepperdine Waves men's basketball

WCAC champions

NCAA tournament
- Conference: West Coast Athletic Conference
- Record: 23–9 (11–1 WCAC)
- Head coach: Jim Harrick (6th season)
- Assistant coaches: Tony Fuller (3rd season); Dan Davis
- Home arena: Firestone Fieldhouse

1984–85 West Coast Athletic Conference men's basketball standings
	Conf.				Overall
Team	W		L	PCT	W		L	PCT
Pepperdine	11	–	1	.917	23	–	9	.719
Santa Clara	9	–	3	.750	20	–	9	.690
Saint Mary's	7	–	5	.583	15	–	12	.556
San Diego	5	–	7	.417	16	–	11	.593
Gonzaga	4	–	8	.333	15	–	13	.536
Portland	3	–	9	.250	14	–	14	.500
Loyola Marymount	3	–	9	.250	11	–	16	.407
Rankings from AP Poll

The 1984–85 Pepperdine Waves men's basketball team represented Pepperdine University in the 1984–85 NCAA Division I men's basketball season. The team was led by head coach Jim Harrick. The Waves played their home games at the Firestone Fieldhouse and were members of the West Coast Athletic Conference. They finished the season 23–9, 11–1 in WCAC play to win the regular season conference title by a 2-game margin to receive an automatic bid to the NCAA tournament. In the opening round, the Waves fell to Duke, 75–62.

== Roster ==
1984–85 Pepperdine Waves men's basketball team
Players
Coaches

Pos.	#	Name	Height	Weight	Year	Previous school	Hometown
G	5	Grant Gondrezick (redshirt)	6 ft 5 in (1.96 m)	195 lb (88 kg)	Sr	Boulder HS	Boulder, Colorado
G	11	Jon Korfas	5 ft 11 in (1.8 m)	165 lb (75 kg)	Jr	San Marcos HS	Santa Barbara, California
G/F	32	Dwayne Polee	6 ft 5 in (1.96 m)	175 lb (79 kg)	Jr	UNLV	Los Angeles, California
F	34	Eric White	6 ft 8 in (2.03 m)	—	So	Sacred Heart Cathedral Preparatory	San Francisco, California
F	44	Anthony Frederick	6 ft 7 in (2.01 m)	200 lb (91 kg)	Jr	Santa Monica College	Los Angeles, California
F	50	Levy Middlebrooks	6 ft 7 in (2.01 m)	235 lb (107 kg)	Fr	St. Ignatius College Preparatory	San Francisco, California

Head coach

- Jim Harrick (Morris Harvey College)

Assistant coach(es)

Legend

- (C) Team captain
- (S) Suspended
- (I) Ineligible
- (W) Walk-on
- Injured
- Current redshirt

Roster

== Schedule and results ==
Date time, TV	Rank^{#}	Opponent^{#}	Result	Record	Site (attendance) city, state
Non-conference regular season
Nov 23, 1984*		at Hawaii	L 78–79	0–1	Neal S. Blaisdell Center; Honolulu, Hawaii
Nov 24, 1984*		at BYU–Hawaii	W 62–58	1–1	
Nov 25, 1984*		at Hawaii Pacific	W 76–72	2–1	
Nov 27, 1984*		Long Beach State	W 81–64	3–1	Firestone Fieldhouse; Malibu, California
Dec 1, 1984*		at Wichita State	W 83–81	4–1	Levitt Arena; Wichita, Kansas
Dec 3, 1984*		at Abilene Christian	L 89–93	4–2	Abilene, Texas
Dec 6, 1984*		Missouri–St. Louis	W 95–77	5–2	Firestone Fieldhouse; Malibu, California
Dec 15, 1984*		at Nevada	L 89–94	5–3	Lawlor Events Center; Reno, Nevada
Dec 17, 1984*		at UC Santa Barbara	W 65–63	6–3	The Thunderdome; Santa Barbara, California
Dec 20, 1984*		at UC Irvine	L 91–92	6–4	Crawford Hall; Irvine, California
Dec 22, 1984*		at Cal State Fullerton	L 75–81	6–5	Titan Gym; Fullerton, California
Dec 28, 1984*		vs. Temple; Cowboy Shootout	L 66–71	6–6	Casper Events Center; Casper, Wyoming
Dec 29, 1984*		vs. Baylor; Cowboy Shootout	W 86–83	7–6	Casper Events Center; Casper, Wyoming
Jan 3, 1985*		Northern Arizona	W 82–65	8–6	Firestone Fieldhouse; Malibu, California
Jan 5, 1985*		Fordham	W 76–71	9–6	Firestone Fieldhouse; Malibu, California
Jan 8, 1985*		Colorado	W 90–64	10–6	Firestone Fieldhouse; Malibu, California
Jan 12, 1985*		Texas State	W 87–70	11–6	Firestone Fieldhouse; Malibu, California
WCAC Regular Season
Jan 17, 1985		at Loyola Marymount	W 77–62	12–6 (1–0)	Gersten Pavilion; Los Angeles, California
Jan 19, 1985		at San Diego	W 60–50	13–6 (2–0)	USD Sports Center; San Diego, California
Jan 24, 1985		at Santa Clara	W 53–52	14–6 (3–0)	Leavey Center; Santa Clara, California
Jan 26, 1985		at Saint Mary's	L 71–76	14–7 (3–1)	McKeon Pavilion; Moraga, California
Jan 31, 1985		Portland	W 76–75	15–7 (4–1)	Firestone Fieldhouse; Malibu, California
Feb 2, 1985		Gonzaga	W 59–55	16–7 (5–1)	Firestone Fieldhouse; Malibu, California
Feb 5, 1985*		U.S. International	W 75–56	17–7	Firestone Fieldhouse; Malibu, California
Feb 9, 1985*		at No. 18 DePaul	L 65–90	17–8	Rosemont Horizon; Rosemont, Illinois
Feb 14, 1985		at Gonzaga	W 69–58	18–8 (6–1)	The Kennel; Spokane, Washington
Feb 16, 1985		Portland	W 80–60	19–8 (7–1)	Firestone Fieldhouse; Malibu, California
Feb 21, 1985		Saint Mary's	W 69–64	20–8 (8–1)	Firestone Fieldhouse; Malibu, California
Feb 23, 1985		Santa Clara	W 97–90	21–8 (9–1)	Firestone Fieldhouse; Malibu, California
Feb 28, 1985		at San Diego	W 57–54	22–8 (10–1)	USD Sports Center; San Diego, California
Mar 2, 1985		Loyola Marymount	W 86–77	23–8 (11–1)	Firestone Fieldhouse; Malibu, California
NCAA Tournament
Mar 15, 1985*	(14 MW)	vs. (3 MW) No. 10 Duke; First round	L 62–75	23–9	Hofheinz Pavilion; Houston, Texas
*Non-conference game. ^{#}Rankings from AP Poll. (#) Tournament seedings in parentheses. MW=Midwest.

== Awards and honors ==
- Dwayne Polee – WCAC Player of the Year
- Jim Harrick – WCAC Coach of the Year
