= 1982–83 Pepperdine Waves men's basketball team =

American college basketball season

1982–83 Pepperdine Waves men's basketball

WCAC champions

NCAA tournament
- Conference: West Coast Athletic Conference
- Record: 20–9 (10–2 WCAC)
- Head coach: Jim Harrick (4th season)
- Home arena: Firestone Fieldhouse

1982–83 West Coast Athletic Conference men's basketball standings
	Conf.				Overall
Team	W		L	PCT	W		L	PCT
Pepperdine	10	–	2	.833	20	–	9	.690
Santa Clara	9	–	3	.750	21	–	7	.750
Saint Mary's	7	–	5	.583	14	–	12	.538
San Diego	5	–	7	.417	11	–	15	.423
Gonzaga	5	–	7	.417	13	–	14	.481
Portland	4	–	8	.333	10	–	18	.357
Loyola Marymount	2	–	10	.167	9	–	18	.333
Rankings from AP Poll

The 1982–83 Pepperdine Waves men's basketball team represented Pepperdine University in the 1982–83 NCAA Division I men's basketball season. The team was led by head coach Jim Harrick. The Waves played their home games at the Firestone Fieldhouse and were members of the West Coast Athletic Conference. They finished the season 20–9, 10–2 in WCAC play to win the regular season conference title to receive an automatic bid to the NCAA tournament. In the opening round, the Waves fell to Jim Valvano’s NC State Wolfpack, 69–67 in 2OT.

== Roster ==
1982–83 Pepperdine Waves men's basketball team
Players
Coaches

Pos.	#	Name	Height	Weight	Year	Previous school	Hometown
G	4	Mark Wilson	6 ft 2 in (1.88 m)	—	Jr
G	5	Grant Gondrezick	6 ft 5 in (1.96 m)	195 lb (88 kg)	So	Boulder HS	Boulder, Colorado
G	11	Jon Korfas	5 ft 11 in (1.8 m)	165 lb (75 kg)	Fr	San Marcos HS	Santa Barbara, California
G	14	Dane Suttle	6 ft 3 in (1.91 m)	190 lb (86 kg)	Sr	John C. Fremont	Los Angeles, California
F	34	Orlando Phillips	6 ft 7 in (2.01 m)	210 lb (95 kg)	Sr	CCSF	San Francisco, California
F	52	Victor Anger	6 ft 8 in (2.03 m)	—
F	54	Bill Sadler	6 ft 6 in (1.98 m)	—

Head coach

- Jim Harrick (Morris Harvey College)

Assistant coach(es)

Legend

- (C) Team captain
- (S) Suspended
- (I) Ineligible
- (W) Walk-on
- Injured
- Current redshirt

== Schedule and results ==
Date time, TV	Rank^{#}	Opponent^{#}	Result	Record	Site (attendance) city, state
Non-conference regular season
Dec 2, 1982*		UC Santa Barbara	W 77–75	1–0	Firestone Fieldhouse; Malibu, California
Dec 4, 1982*		vs. UC Irvine	L 82–85	1–1	Anaheim Convention Center; Anaheim, California
Dec 11, 1982*		Fresno State	L 56–65	1–2	Firestone Fieldhouse; Malibu, California
Dec 16, 1982*		at Nevada	W 86–83	2–2	Centennial Coliseum; Reno, Nevada
Dec 18, 1982*		at Montana State	W 79–56	3–2	Worthington Arena; Havre, Montana
Dec 21, 1982*		Kent State	L 65–66	3–3	Firestone Fieldhouse; Malibu, California
Dec 23, 1982*		Texas Tech	W 93–85	4–3	Firestone Fieldhouse; Malibu, California
Dec 27, 1982*		No. 18 Houston	L 92–93	4–4	Firestone Fieldhouse; Malibu, California
Dec 30, 1982*		Long Beach State	W 105–90	5–4	Firestone Fieldhouse; Malibu, California
Jan 4, 1983*		at Cal State Fullerton	L 74–85	5–5	Titan Gym; Fullerton, California
Jan 8, 1983*		at DePaul	L 73–78	5–6	Rosemont Horizon; Rosemont, Illinois
Jan 15, 1983*		U.S. International	W 92–70	6–6	Firestone Fieldhouse; Malibu, California
WCAC Regular Season
Jan 21, 1983		Gonzaga	L 68–69	10–7 (0–1)	Firestone Fieldhouse; Malibu, California
Jan 22, 1983		Portland	W 83–70	11–7 (1–1)	Firestone Fieldhouse; Malibu, California
Jan 29, 1983		at San Diego	W 61–58	12–7 (2–1)	USD Sports Center; San Diego, California
Feb 4, 1983		Santa Clara	W 67–62	13–7 (3–1)	Firestone Fieldhouse; Malibu, California
Feb 5, 1983		Saint Mary's	W 76–67	14–7 (4–1)	Firestone Fieldhouse; Malibu, California
Feb 12, 1983		at Loyola Marymount	W 101–92	15–7 (5–1)	Gersten Pavilion; Los Angeles, California
Feb 18, 1983		at Saint Mary's	W 66–59	16–7 (6–1)	McKeon Pavilion; Moraga, California
Feb 19, 1983		at Santa Clara	L 68–79	16–8 (6–2)	Leavey Center; Santa Clara, California
Feb 25, 1983		San Diego	W 82–69	17–8 (7–2)	Firestone Fieldhouse; Malibu, California
Mar 3, 1983		at Portland	W 78–69	18–8 (8–2)	Howard Hall; Portland, Oregon
Mar 5, 1983		at Gonzaga	W 68–58	19–8 (9–2)	Kennedy Pavilion; Spokane, Washington
Mar 10, 1983		Loyola Marymount	W 99–91	20–8 (10–2)	Firestone Fieldhouse; Malibu, California
NCAA Tournament
Mar 18, 1983*	(11 W)	vs. (6 W) No. 16 NC State; First round	L 67–69 ^{2OT}	20–9	Gill Coliseum; Corvallis, Oregon
*Non-conference game. ^{#}Rankings from AP Poll. (#) Tournament seedings in parentheses. W=West.

== Awards and honors ==
- Dane Suttle – WCAC co-Player of the Year
- Jim Harrick – WCAC Coach of the Year
