= 1981–82 Pepperdine Waves men's basketball team =

American college basketball season

1981–82 Pepperdine Waves men's basketball

WCAC regular season champions

NCAA tournament, second round
- Conference: West Coast Athletic Conference
- Record: 22–7 (14–0 WCAC)
- Head coach: Jim Harrick (3rd season)
- Home arena: Firestone Fieldhouse

1981–82 West Coast Athletic Conference men's basketball standings
	Conf.				Overall
Team	W		L	PCT	W		L	PCT
Pepperdine	14	–	0	1.000	22	–	7	.759
San Francisco	11	–	3	.786	26	–	5	.839
Portland	9	–	5	.643	17	–	10	.630
Santa Clara	7	–	7	.500	16	–	11	.593
Gonzaga	7	–	7	.500	15	–	12	.556
San Diego	4	–	10	.286	11	–	15	.423
Saint Mary's	3	–	11	.214	11	–	16	.407
Loyola Marymount	1	–	13	.071	3	–	24	.111
Rankings from AP Poll

The 1981–82 Pepperdine Waves men's basketball team represented Pepperdine University in the 1981–82 NCAA Division I men's basketball season. The team was led by head coach Jim Harrick. The Waves played their home games at the Firestone Fieldhouse and were members of the West Coast Athletic Conference. They finished the season 22–7, 14–0 in WCAC play to win the regular season conference title to receive an automatic bid to the NCAA tournament. In the opening round, the Waves beat Pittsburgh before falling to Oregon State, 70–51, in the second round.

== Roster ==
1981–82 Pepperdine Waves men's basketball team
Players
Coaches

Pos.	#	Name	Height	Weight	Year	Previous school	Hometown
G	4	Mark Wilson	6 ft 2 in (1.88 m)	—	So
G	5	Grant Gondrezick	6 ft 5 in (1.96 m)	195 lb (88 kg)	Fr	Boulder HS	Boulder, Colorado
G	14	Dane Suttle	6 ft 3 in (1.91 m)	190 lb (86 kg)	Jr	John C. Fremont	Los Angeles, California
F	34	Orlando Phillips	6 ft 7 in (2.01 m)	210 lb (95 kg)	Jr	CCSF	San Francisco, California
F	52	Victor Anger	6 ft 8 in (2.03 m)	—
F	54	Bill Sadler	6 ft 6 in (1.98 m)	—

Head coach

- Jim Harrick (Morris Harvey College)

Assistant coach(es)

Legend

- (C) Team captain
- (S) Suspended
- (I) Ineligible
- (W) Walk-on
- Injured
- Current redshirt

== Schedule and results ==
Date time, TV	Rank^{#}	Opponent^{#}	Result	Record	Site (attendance) city, state
Non-conference regular season
Nov 28, 1981*		at No. 2 UCLA	L 69–76	0–1	Pauley Pavilion; Los Angeles, California
Nov 30, 1981*		Northern Arizona	W 88–67	1–1	Firestone Fieldhouse; Malibu, California
Dec 4, 1981*		vs. Cincinnati	L 72–73	1–2	
Dec 5, 1981*		vs. District of Columbia	W 72–71	2–2	
Dec 12, 1981*		at No. 19 Oregon State	L 69–84	2–3	Gill Coliseum; Corvallis, Oregon
Dec 18, 1981*		Texas–Arlington	W 102–97	3–3	Firestone Fieldhouse; Malibu, California
Dec 19, 1981*		Evansville	L 69–77	3–4	Firestone Fieldhouse; Malibu, California
Dec 23, 1981*		Rice	W 77–64	4–4	Firestone Fieldhouse; Malibu, California
Dec 30, 1981*		St. Mary's (Texas)	W 76–64	5–4	Firestone Fieldhouse; Malibu, California
Jan 2, 1982*		Northland College	W 110–59	6–4	Firestone Fieldhouse; Malibu, California
Jan 5, 1982*		Cal State Fullerton	W 95–76	7–4	Firestone Fieldhouse; Malibu, California
Jan 7, 1982*		at Fresno State	L 46–63	7–5	Selland Arena; Fresno, California
Jan 9, 1982*		at Long Beach State	L 78–80	7–6	Long Beach Arena; Long Beach, California
WCAC Regular Season
Jan 15, 1982		San Francisco	W 102–91	8–6 (1–0)	Firestone Fieldhouse; Malibu, California
Jan 16, 1982		Santa Clara	W 77–73	9–6 (2–0)	Firestone Fieldhouse; Malibu, California
Jan 22, 1982		Saint Mary's	W 94–91 ^{2OT}	10–6 (3–0)	Firestone Fieldhouse; Malibu, California
Jan 23, 1982		San Diego	W 80–69	11–6 (4–0)	Firestone Fieldhouse; Malibu, California
Jan 30, 1982		Loyola Marymount	W 92–79	12–6 (5–0)	Firestone Fieldhouse; Malibu, California
Feb 4, 1982		at Portland	W 76–58	13–6 (6–0)	Howard Hall; Portland, Oregon
Feb 6, 1982		at Gonzaga	W 76–67 ^{OT}	14–6 (7–0)	Kennedy Pavilion; Spokane, Washington
Feb 12, 1982		Gonzaga	W 73–59	15–6 (8–0)	Firestone Fieldhouse; Malibu, California
Feb 13, 1982		Portland	W 92–79	16–6 (9–0)	Firestone Fieldhouse; Malibu, California
Feb 18, 1982		at San Diego	W 63–61	17–6 (10–0)	USD Sports Center; San Diego, California
Feb 20, 1982		at Saint Mary's	W 79–66	18–6 (11–0)	University Credit Union Pavilion; Moraga, California
Feb 26, 1982		at Santa Clara	W 76–74 ^{2OT}	19–6 (12–0)	Harold J. Toso Pavilion; Santa Clara, California
Feb 28, 1982		at No. 16 San Francisco	W 106–100	20–6 (13–0)	War Memorial Gymnasium; San Francisco, California
Mar 4, 1982		at Loyola Marymount	W 105–104 ^{OT}	21–6 (14–0)	Gersten Pavilion; Los Angeles, California
NCAA Tournament
Mar 12, 1982*	(7 W)	vs. (10 W) Pittsburgh; First round	W 99–88	22–6	Friel Court at Beasley Coliseum; Pullman, Washington
Mar 14, 1982*; 4:08 p.m., CBS	(7 W)	vs. (2 W) No. 4 Oregon State; Second round	L 51–70	22–7	Friel Court at Beasley Coliseum (12,340); Pullman, Washington
*Non-conference game. ^{#}Rankings from AP Poll. (#) Tournament seedings in parentheses. W=West.

== Awards and honors ==
- Jim Harrick – WCAC Coach of the Year
