= Brandon Armstrong =

Brandon Armstrong may refer to:

- Brandon Armstrong (basketball)
- Brandon Armstrong (dancer)
