= Jim Harrick =

American basketball coach (born 1938)

- Harrick in 2008

Biographical details
- Born: July 25, 1938 (age 88); Charleston, West Virginia, U.S.
- Education: Morris Harvey College

Coaching career (HC unless noted)
- 1963–1969: Morningside HS (CA) (assistant)
- 1969–1973: Morningside HS (CA)
- 1973–1977: Utah State (assistant)
- 1977–1979: UCLA (assistant)
- 1979–1988: Pepperdine
- 1988–1996: UCLA
- 1997–1999: Rhode Island
- 1999–2003: Georgia
- 2006–2007: Bakersfield Jam
- 2018–2021: Cal State Northridge (assistant)

Head coaching record
- Overall: 470–235 (college)

Accomplishments and honors

Championships
- NCAA Division I (1995); 5× WCAC Regular Season (1981–1983, 1985, 1986); 3× Pac-10 Regular Season (1992, 1995, 1996); Atlantic 10 tournament (1999)

Awards
- Naismith College Coach of the Year (1995); Pac-10 Coach of the Year (1995); 4× WCAC Coach of the Year (1982, 1983, 1985, 1986)

James Richard Harrick (born July 25, 1938) is an American former basketball coach. He was the head coach at UCLA, Pepperdine University, the University of Rhode Island, and the University of Georgia over a combined total of 23 seasons. During the 1994–1995 season, he led UCLA to a 31–1 record and the school's eleventh national championship, its first since the 1974–75 season.

== Biography ==
Born in Charleston, West Virginia, Harrick graduated in 1960 from Morris Harvey College, now known as the University of Charleston.

=== College coaching career ===
Harrick's coaching career began at Morningside High School in Inglewood, California where he served as an assistant coach from 1964 to 1969 and as head coach from 1970 to 1973. He was then hired as an assistant coach at Utah State University from 1974 to 1977. Harrick then spent two seasons as an assistant coach at UCLA from 1978 to 1979. His first collegiate head coaching job was at Pepperdine University in 1979, where he led the school to four NCAA tournament appearances and was a conference coach of the year four times.

==== UCLA ====
In 1988, he returned to UCLA to assume head coaching duties after the firing of Walt Hazzard. During the recruiting period before his first season, he recruited Don MacLean, the most significant recruit to commit to Westwood in several years. McLean's arrival helped start a revival of the basketball program. By 1992, the Bruins were back in the Elite Eight, officially the first time they had advanced that far in 13 years. The 1979-80 team went all the way to the national championship game, but had that appearance vacated due to ineligible players. This was officially the second time they had advanced that far since John Wooden left the school.

During the 1994–95 season, he led UCLA to a 31–2 record (a loss to California was subsequently forfeited to the Bruins) and the school's eleventh national championship, its first since the 1974–75 season. The 31 wins would stand as a school record until the 2005–06 season. A year later, Harrick's Bruins were upset in the first round by Princeton.

As it turned out, this would be the last game Harrick would coach in Westwood. Shortly before the start of the 1996–97 season, he was accused of falsifying receipts at a student-athlete recruiting dinner when two current players, Cameron Dollar and Charles O'Bannon, joined the table. Since Harrick paid for the entire meal, it amounted to an improper extra benefit for Dollar and O'Bannon. To cover up their presence, Harrick included the names of his wife and the wife of newly hired assistant Michael Holton on the expense report. When the school investigated, Harrick told Holton to tell athletic director Peter Dalis that Holton's wife was at the meal. However, a day later, Holton confessed that was not true. On November 6, 1996, Dalis and school chancellor Chuck Young gave Harrick an ultimatum: resign by the next morning or be fired. Harrick opted to take the firing. Although picking up the tab for Dollar and O'Bannon was a secondary violation at best, Young and Dalis felt Harrick's attempted cover-up was unforgivable. However, Harrick claims that the NCAA has cleared him of wrongdoing.

He left UCLA as the school's second-winningest coach, behind only Wooden; he is now third, having since been passed by Ben Howland.

==== Rhode Island ====
After a one-year hiatus, Harrick returned to coaching by accepting the head coach position at Rhode Island. He coached the Rams for two seasons (from 1997 to 1999), where in both years they qualified for the NCAA Tournament. During the 1998 tournament, the Rams upset Kansas in the second round and reached the Midwest Regional finals but were defeated by Stanford 79–77. In his second season, he managed to recruit Lamar Odom and led the Rams to their first Atlantic 10 Conference tournament title.

==== Georgia ====
After the season, he left URI to become the head coach at the University of Georgia. He served there for four seasons (1999–2000 through 2002–03), leading the Bulldogs to the NCAA tournament twice following a losing record.

His tenure at Georgia ended in controversy in the spring of 2003. His son, Jim Harrick Jr., a Georgia assistant, got into trouble for paying $300 in expenses for one of his players, Tony Cole. He also gave an "A" to Cole, Rashad Wright and Chris Daniels for a basketball strategy class even though they never attended it. The class also had a test with the question, "How many points is a three-point basket worth?" After the story broke, Georgia pulled out of the 2003 SEC Tournament and withdrew from postseason consideration. The school suspended Harrick Jr. on February 28, 2003 and fired him five days later. Harrick Sr. was suspended on March 10 and resigned on March 27 after being told his contract would not be renewed.

An NCAA investigation confirmed the violations, also finding that six players did not pay for over $1,500 of long-distance telephone calls in December 2001. The telephone charges in question were due to hotel error and ultimately never charged to the program. Since they were not valid charges, Georgia did not self-report the violations until an internal investigation into the program in July 2003. In 2004 the NCAA placed Georgia on four years' probation for the violations. It also forced the Bulldogs to vacate half of their wins from 2001–02 and all their wins from 2002–03—30 games in all. Harrick Jr. was given a seven-year show-cause penalty order for his role in the academic fraud, as well as telling two of the players involved to lie to the NCAA. The 'show-cause' effectively blackballed him from the college ranks until 2011 at the earliest.

=== Later career ===
After Georgia, Harrick worked as a scout for the NBA's Denver Nuggets and helped develop basketball in China.

On June 13, 2006, Harrick accepted the head coaching position for the Bakersfield Jam, an NBA Development League team. Harrick resigned for personal reasons in December 2007, after the Jam struggled to a 2–14 record.

Harrick later became a college basketball analyst for Prime Ticket, the Southern California affiliate of Fox Sports Net. From 2018 until 2021, Harrick was an assistant men's basketball coach at California State University, Northridge.

== Head coaching record ==
=== College ===
Record table
Season	Team	Overall	Conference	Standing	Postseason
Pepperdine Waves (West Coast Athletic Conference) (1979–1988)
1979–80	Pepperdine	17–11	9–7	T–5th	NIT First Round
1980–81	Pepperdine	16–12	11–3	T–1st	
1981–82	Pepperdine	22–7	14–0	1st	NCAA Division I Second Round
1982–83	Pepperdine	20–9	10–2	1st	NCAA Division I First Round
1983–84	Pepperdine	15–13	6–6	T–4th	
1984–85	Pepperdine	23–9	11–1	1st	NCAA Division I First Round
1985–86	Pepperdine	25–5	13–1	1st	NCAA Division I First Round
1986–87	Pepperdine	12–18	5–9	7th	
1987–88	Pepperdine	17–13	8–6	4th	NIT First Round
Pepperdine:		167–97	87–35		
UCLA Bruins (Pacific-10 Conference) (1988–1996)
1988–89	UCLA	21–10	13–5	3rd	NCAA Division I Second Round
1989–90	UCLA	22–11	11–7	4th	NCAA Division I Sweet 16
1990–91	UCLA	23–9	11–7	2nd	NCAA Division I First Round
1991–92	UCLA	28–5	16–2	1st	NCAA Division I Elite Eight
1992–93	UCLA	22–11	11–7	3rd	NCAA Division I Second Round
1993–94	UCLA	21–7	13–5	2nd	NCAA Division I First Round
1994–95	UCLA	31–2	16–2	1st	NCAA Division I Champion
1995–96	UCLA	23–8	16–2	1st	NCAA Division I First Round
UCLA:		192–62	108–36		
Rhode Island Rams (Atlantic 10 Conference) (1997–1999)
1997–98	Rhode Island	25–9	12–4	2nd (East)	NCAA Division I Elite Eight
1998–99	Rhode Island	20–13	10–6	2nd (East)	NCAA Division I First Round
Rhode Island:		45–22	22–10		
Georgia Bulldogs (Southeastern Conference) (1999–2003)
1999–00	Georgia	10–20	3–13	6th (East)	
2000–01	Georgia	16–15	9–7	3rd (East)	NCAA Division I First Round
2001–02	Georgia	22–10*	10–6*	T–1st (East)*	NCAA Division I Second Round*
2002–03	Georgia	19–8*	11–5*	3rd (East)	
Georgia:		67–53**	33–31**		
Total:		470–235			
National champion Postseason invitational champion Conference regular season champion Conference regular season and conference tournament champion Division regular season champion Division regular season and conference tournament champion Conference tournament champion

*Georgia vacated 11 wins in 2001–02 and all of its wins in 2002–03, as well as its share of the 2002 SEC East title and its 2002 NCAA tournament appearance, due to an academic fraud scandal. Official record for 2001–02 is 11–10 (0–6 SEC), official record for 2002–03 is 0–8 (0–5 SEC).
**Record at Georgia is 37–53 (12–31 SEC) without vacated games.

== Awards ==
- 1995: National Coach of the Year (Naismith, NABC)
- 1995: Pac-10 Coach of the Year
- 1990: Morris Harvey College–University of Charleston Golden Eagle Sports Hall of Fame
- 1982–1983, 1985–1986: West Coast Athletic Conference Coach of the Year (Pepperdine)

== Personal life ==
On November 20, 2009 Harrick's wife of 49 years, Sally Lee, died aged 70 from complications of scleroderma. His son Jim Jr. died in April 2023 at age 58 after battling a brain tumor for 2½ years.

== See also ==
- List of NCAA Division I men's basketball tournament Final Four appearances by coach
