= 1982–83 Gonzaga Bulldogs men's basketball team =

American college basketball season

1982–83 Gonzaga Bulldogs men's basketball
- Conference: West Coast Athletic Conference
- Record: 13–14 (5–7 WCAC)
- Head coach: Jay Hillock (2nd season)
- Home arena: Kennedy Pavilion

1982–83 West Coast Athletic Conference men's basketball standings
	Conf.				Overall
Team	W		L	PCT	W		L	PCT
Pepperdine	10	–	2	.833	20	–	9	.690
Santa Clara	9	–	3	.750	21	–	7	.750
Saint Mary's	7	–	5	.583	14	–	12	.538
San Diego	5	–	7	.417	11	–	15	.423
Gonzaga	5	–	7	.417	13	–	14	.481
Portland	4	–	8	.333	10	–	18	.357
Loyola Marymount	2	–	10	.167	9	–	18	.333
Rankings from AP Poll

The 1982–83 Gonzaga Bulldogs men's basketball team represented Gonzaga University in the West Coast Athletic Conference (WCAC) during the 1982–83 NCAA Division I men's basketball season. Led by second-year head coach Jay Hillock, the Bulldogs were 13–14 (.481) overall (5–7 in WCAC, tied for fourth), and played their home games on campus at Kennedy Pavilion in Spokane, Washington.

Point guard John Stockton was a junior this season; he and junior guard Bryce McPhee were named to the all-conference team. The lone senior on the roster was guard Dale Wiitala.
