= Brendan Lane (basketball) =

American basketball player (born 1990)

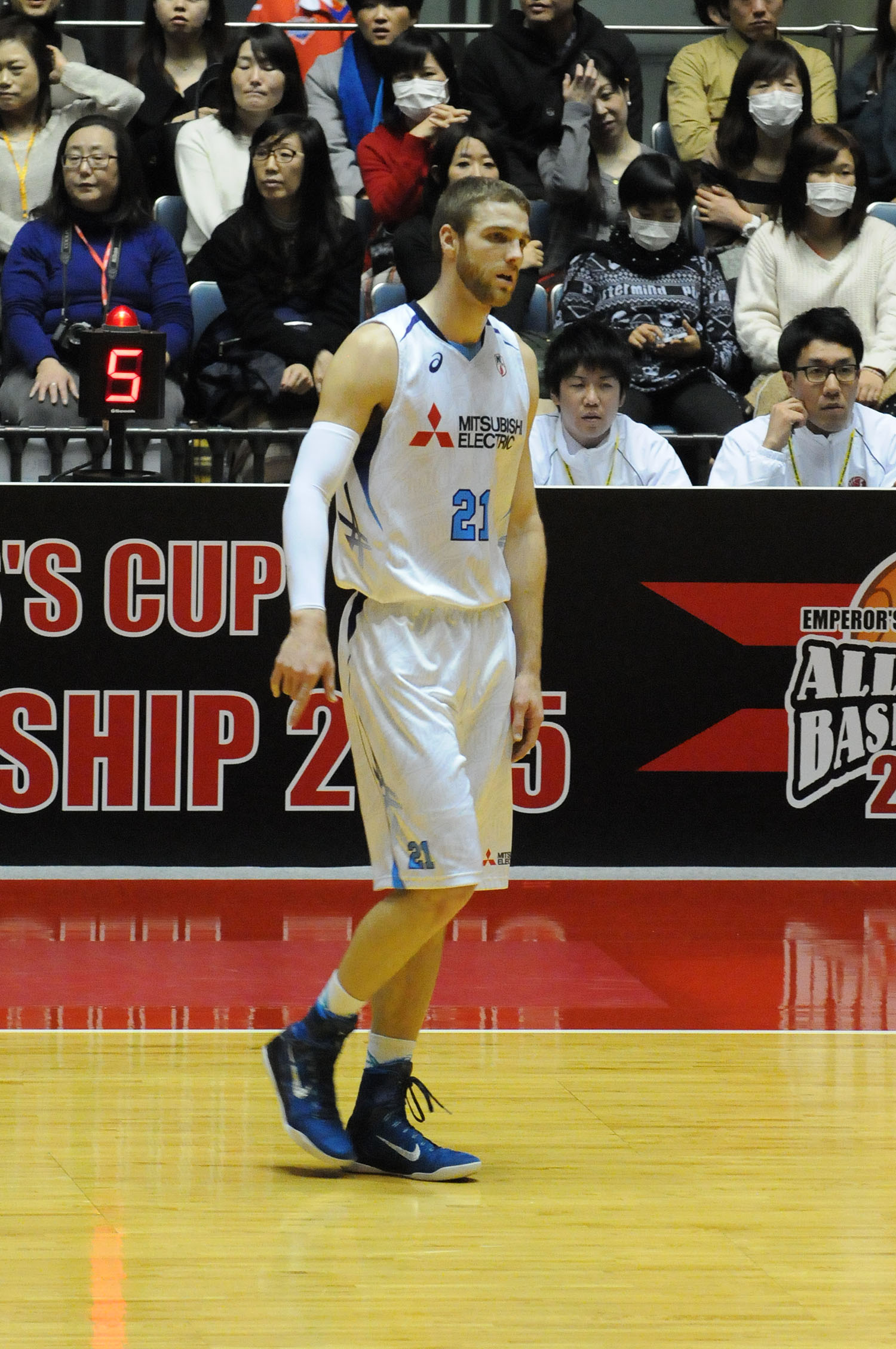

Personal information
- Born: November 19, 1990 (age 35) Montpelier, Vermont, U.S.
- Listed height: 6 ft 9 in (2.06 m)
- Listed weight: 229 lb (104 kg)

Career information
- High school: Rocklin (Rocklin, California)
- College: UCLA (2009–2012); Pepperdine (2013–2014)
- NBA draft: 2014: undrafted
- Playing career: 2014–2018
- Position: Center

Career history
- 2014–2015: Mitsubishi Diamond Dolphins
- 2015–2017: s.Oliver Würzburg
- 2017: Shimane Susanoo Magic
- 2017–2018: Alvark Tokyo

Career highlights
- B.League champion (2018); WCC Defensive Player of the Year (2014)

Brendan Gerald Lane (born November 19, 1990) is an American retired professional basketball player who last played for Alvark Tokyo of the B.League in Japan.
