= 1983 NBA draft =

Basketball player selection

General information
- Sport: Basketball
- Date: June 28, 1983
- Location: Felt Forum, Madison Square Garden (New York City, New York)
- Networks: USA Network; ESPN

Overview
- 226 total selections in 10 rounds
- League: NBA
- First selection: Ralph Sampson (Houston Rockets)
- Hall of Famers: 2: C Ralph Sampson; SG Clyde Drexler; 3 doc rivers

The 1983 NBA draft took place on June 28, 1983, in New York City. A total of 226 players were selected over 10 rounds by the league's 23 teams.

The Houston Rockets selected 7'4" center Ralph Sampson with the first overall pick. Sampson, a three-time College Player of the Year at the University of Virginia, won the NBA Rookie of the Year award and was selected as an NBA All-Star early in his career before subsequent injuries impacted his playing career.

Sampson was joined in the Hall by University of Houston Cougars standout Clyde “The Glide” Drexler, taken number 14 by the Portland Trail Blazers. Despite there being only 23 teams at the time of the draft, the Cleveland Cavaliers were awarded the 24th pick out of courtesy. Then-owner Ted Stepien was infamous for repeatedly trading first-round picks in the late 1970s and early 1980s, which, considering Cleveland's morose records in that time period, eventually culminated in the NBA creating a rule banning teams from dealing all of their first-round picks in consecutive years.

Four players from the 1983 draft later served or now serve as coaches—Doc Rivers for the Philadelphia 76ers, Randy Wittman for the Washington Wizards, Byron Scott for the Los Angeles Lakers from 2014 to 2016, and point guard of the 1983 NCAA championship North Carolina State Wolfpack Sidney Lowe. While Scott won the Coach of the Year award in 2008, Rivers won an NBA Championship with the Celtics in that same year.

7’7” Manute Bol was selected in the 5th round by the Clippers, but the NBA rejected the pick on technicalities. Manute had never filed draft paperwork, and his passport listed him at 19 (at the time, 19 years was too young to be drafted).

Florida State star Mitchell Wiggins, father of future No. 1 overall draft pick Andrew Wiggins, was drafted 23rd by the Indiana Pacers.

== Draft ==
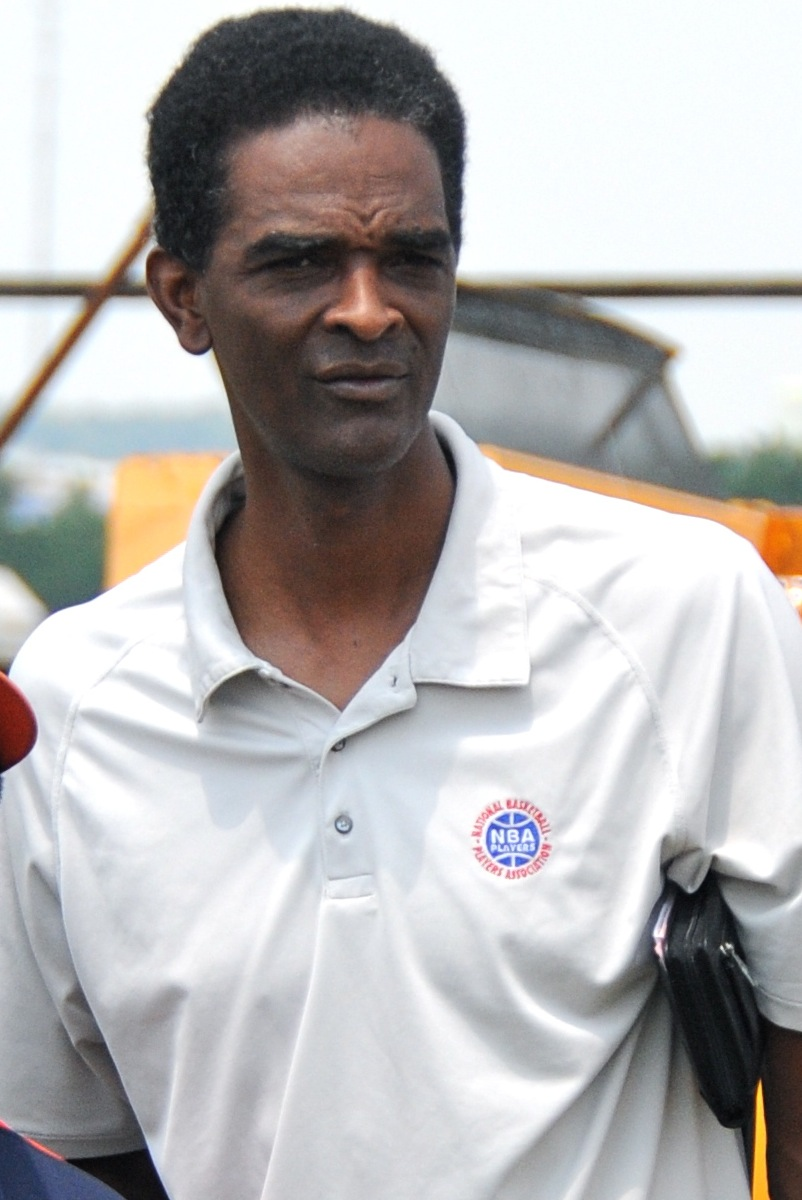
Ralph Sampson was selected first overall by the Houston Rockets.

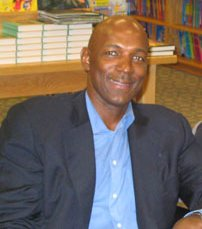
Clyde Drexler was selected fourteenth overall by the Portland Trail Blazers.

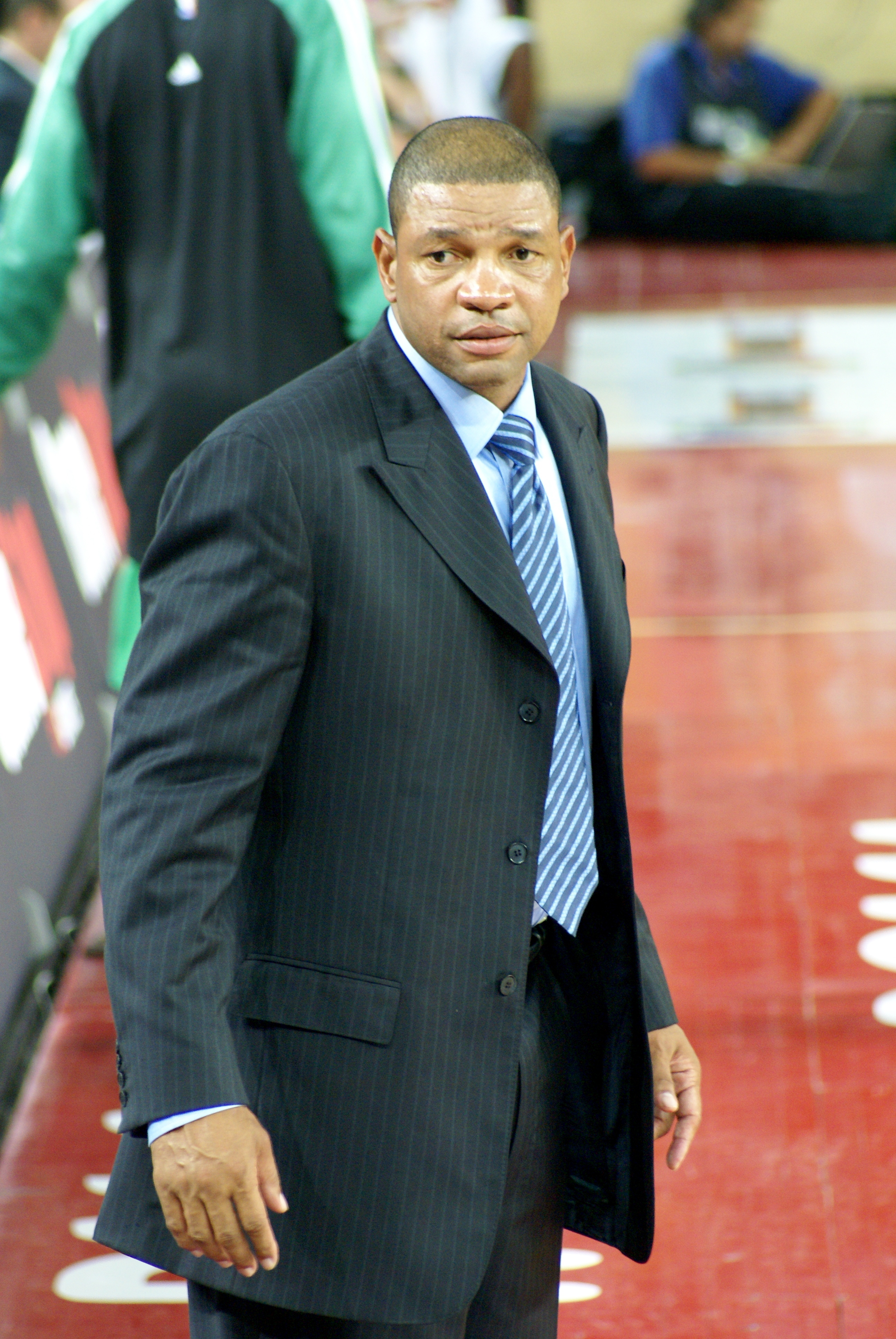
Doc Rivers was selected thirty-first overall by the Atlanta Hawks

PG	Point guard	SG	Shooting guard	SF	Small forward	PF	Power forward	C	Center

^	Denotes player who has been inducted to the Naismith Memorial Basketball Hall of Fame
*	Denotes player who has been selected for at least one All-Star Game and All-NBA Team
^{+}	Denotes player who has been selected for at least one All-Star Game
^{#}	Denotes player who has never appeared in an NBA regular-season or playoff game
^{~}	Denotes player who has been selected as Rookie of the Year

Rnd.	Pick	Player	Pos.	Nationality (Note: Nationality indicates the player's national team or representative nationality. If a player has not competed at the international level, then the nationality indicates the national team which the player is eligible to represent according to FIBA rules.)	Team	School / club team
1	1	Ralph Sampson^~	C	United States	Houston Rockets	Virginia (Sr.)
1	2	Steve Stipanovich	C	United States	Indiana Pacers	Missouri (Sr.)
1	3	Rodney McCray	SF	United States	Houston Rockets (from Cleveland via Philadelphia)	Louisville (Sr.)
1	4	Byron Scott	SG	United States	San Diego Clippers (traded to Los Angeles)	Arizona State (Jr.)
1	5	Sidney Green	PF	United States	Chicago Bulls	UNLV (Sr.)
1	6	Russell Cross	C	United States	Golden State Warriors	Purdue (Jr.)
1	7	Thurl Bailey	PF	United States	Utah Jazz	NC State (Sr.)
1	8	Antoine Carr	PF	United States	Detroit Pistons	Wichita State (Sr.)
1	9	Dale Ellis*	SG	United States	Dallas Mavericks	Tennessee (Sr.)
1	10	Jeff Malone^{+}	SG	United States	Washington Bullets	Mississippi State (Sr.)
1	11	Derek Harper	PG/SG	United States	Dallas Mavericks (from Atlanta via Cleveland)	Illinois (Jr.)
1	12	Darrell Walker	SG	United States	New York Knicks	Arkansas (Sr.)
1	13	Ennis Whatley	PG	United States	Kansas City Kings	Alabama (So.)
1	14	Clyde Drexler^	SG	United States	Portland Trail Blazers	Houston (Jr.)
1	15	Howard Carter	SG	United States	Denver Nuggets	LSU (Sr.)
1	16	Jon Sundvold	PG	United States	Seattle SuperSonics	Missouri (Sr.)
1	17	Leo Rautins	SF	Canada	Philadelphia 76ers (from New Jersey)	Syracuse (Sr.)
1	18	Randy Breuer	C	United States	Milwaukee Bucks	Minnesota (Sr.)
1	19	John Paxson	PG	United States	San Antonio Spurs	Notre Dame (Sr.)
1	20	Roy Hinson	C	United States	Cleveland Cavaliers (from Phoenix)	Rutgers (Sr.)
1	21	Greg Kite	C	United States	Boston Celtics	BYU (Sr.)
1	22	Randy Wittman	SG	United States	Washington Bullets (from Los Angeles)	Indiana (Sr.)
1	23	Mitchell Wiggins	SG	United States	Indiana Pacers (from Philadelphia)	Florida State (Sr.)
1	24	Stewart Granger	PG	Canada	Cleveland Cavaliers *	Villanova (Sr.)
2	25	Sidney Lowe	PG	United States	Chicago Bulls	NC State (Sr.)
2	26	Leroy Combs	SF	United States	Indiana Pacers	Oklahoma State (Sr.)
2	27	John Garris	PF	United States	Cleveland Cavaliers	Boston College (Sr.)
2	28	Rod Foster	PG	United States	Phoenix Suns	UCLA (Sr.)
2	29	Larry Micheaux	PF	United States	Chicago Bulls	Houston (Sr.)
2	30	Mark West	C	United States	Dallas Mavericks	Old Dominion (Sr.)
2	31	Doc Rivers^{+} (Note: Rivers will be inducted into the Hall of Fame in 2026 as a coach.)	PG	United States	Atlanta Hawks	Marquette (Jr.)
2	32	Michael Britt^{#}	SF	United States	Washington Bullets	UDC (Sr.)
2	33	Dirk Minniefield	PG	United States	Dallas Mavericks	Kentucky (Sr.)
2	34	Guy Williams	F	United States	Washington Bullets	Washington State (Sr.)
2	35	Darrell Lockhart	C	United States	San Antonio Spurs	Auburn (Sr.)
2	36	Scooter McCray	PF	United States	Seattle SuperSonics	Louisville (Sr.)
2	37	David Russell^{#}	SF	United States	Denver Nuggets	St. John's (Sr.)
2	38	Chris McNealy	PF	United States	Kansas City Kings	San Jose State (Sr.)
2	39	Granville Waiters	C	United States	Portland Trail Blazers	Ohio State (Sr.)
2	40	Jim Thomas	SG	United States	Indiana Pacers	Indiana (Sr.)
2	41	Ted Kitchel^{#}	SF	United States	Milwaukee Bucks	Indiana (Sr.)
2	42	Mike Davis^{#}	SG	United States	Milwaukee Bucks	Alabama (Sr.)
2	43	Pace Mannion	SF	United States	Golden State Warriors	Utah (Sr.)
2	44	Horace Owens^{#}	SG	United States	New Jersey Nets	Rhode Island (Sr.)
2	45	Paul Williams^{#}	SF	United States	Phoenix Suns	Arizona State (Sr.)
2	46	Kevin Williams	PG	United States	San Antonio Spurs	St. John's (Sr.)
2	47	Kenneth Lyons^{#}	PF	United States	Philadelphia 76ers	North Texas State (Sr.)
3	48	Craig Ehlo	SG	United States	Houston Rockets	Washington State (Sr.)
3	49	Greg Jones^{#}	G	United States	Indiana Pacers	West Virginia (Sr.)
3	50	Paul Thompson	SF	United States	Cleveland Cavaliers	Tulane (Sr.)
3	51	Dereck Whittenburg^{#}	G	United States	Phoenix Suns	NC State (Sr.)
3	52	Winfred King^{#}	G	United States	Indiana Pacers	East Tennessee State (Sr.)
3	53	Mike Holton	SG	United States	Golden State Warriors	UCLA (Sr.)
3	54	Bob Hansen	SG	United States	Utah Jazz	Iowa (Sr.)
3	55	Erich Santifer^{#}	G	United States	Detroit Pistons	Syracuse (Sr.)
3	56	Larry Anderson^{#}	SG	United States	Cleveland Cavaliers	UNLV (Sr.)
3	57	Darren Daye	SF	United States	Washington Bullets	UCLA (Sr.)
3	58	John Pinone	SF	United States	Atlanta Hawks	Villanova (Sr.)
3	59	Bruce Kuczenski	PF	United States	New Jersey Nets	Connecticut (Sr.)
3	60	Steve Harriel^{#}	F	United States	Kansas City Kings	Washington State (Sr.)
3	61	David Little^{#}	F	United States	Denver Nuggets	Oklahoma (Sr.)
3	62	Tom Piotrowski	C	United States	Portland Trail Blazers	La Salle (Sr.)
3	63	Frank Burnell^{#}	G	United States	Seattle SuperSonics	Stetson (Sr.)
3	64	Claude Riley^{#}	F	United States	Philadelphia 76ers	Texas A&M (Sr.)
3	65	Billy Goodwin^{#}	G	United States	Milwaukee Bucks	St. John's (Sr.)
3	66	Les Craft^{#}	C	United States	Cleveland Cavaliers	Kansas State (Sr.)
3	67	Derrick Hord^{#}	G	United States	Cleveland Cavaliers	Kentucky (Sr.)
3	68	Craig Robinson^{#}	F	United States	Boston Celtics	Virginia (Sr.)
3	69	Orlando Phillips^{#}	F	United States	Los Angeles Lakers	Pepperdine (Sr.)
3	70	Dan Ruland^{#}	F	United States	Philadelphia 76ers	James Madison (Sr.)
4	71	Darrell Browder^{#}	G	United States	Houston Rockets	TCU (Sr.)
4	72	Terry Fair^{#}	C	United States	Indiana Pacers	Georgia (Sr.)
4	73	Dwight Jones^{#}	F	United States	Cleveland Cavaliers	Cincinnati (Sr.)
4	74	Kalpatrick Wells^{#}	F	United States	Philadelphia 76ers	Mississippi State (Sr.)
4	75	Ron Crevier	C	Canada	Chicago Bulls	Boston College (Sr.)
4	76	Doug Arnold^{#}	F	United States	Utah Jazz	TCU (Sr.)
4	77	Peter Thibeaux	SF	United States	Golden State Warriors	Saint Mary's (Sr.)
4	78	Steve Bouchie^{#}	F	United States	Detroit Pistons	Indiana (Sr.)
4	79	Johnny Martin^{#}	F	United States	Dallas Mavericks	Northwestern State (Sr.)
4	80	Dan Gay^{#}	F	United States	Washington Bullets	Southwestern Louisiana (Sr.)
4	81	Harry Kelly^{#}	F	United States	Atlanta Hawks	Texas Southern (Sr.)
4	82	Mark Jones	PG	United States	New York Knicks	St. Bonaventure (Sr.)
4	83	York Gross^{#}	G	United States	Denver Nuggets	UC Santa Barbara (Sr.)
4	84	Mike Jackson^{#}	G	United States	Kansas City Kings	Wyoming (Sr.)
4	85	Tim Dunham^{#}	G	United States	Portland Trail Blazers	Chaminade (Sr.)
4	86	Pete DeBisschop^{#}	C	United States	Seattle SuperSonics	Fairfield (Sr.)
4	87	Barney Mines^{#}	G	United States	New Jersey Nets	Bradley (Sr.)
4	88	Mark Nickens^{#}	G	United States	Milwaukee Bucks	American (Sr.)
4	89	Sam Mosley^{#}	F	United States	Phoenix Suns	Nevada (Sr.)
4	90	Brant Weidner	PF	United States	San Antonio Spurs	William & Mary (Sr.)
4	91	Carlos Clark	SG	United States	Boston Celtics	Ole Miss (Sr.)
4	92	Terry Lewis^{#}	G	United States	Los Angeles Lakers	Mississippi State (Sr.)
4	93	Craig Robinson^{#}	F	United States	Philadelphia 76ers	Princeton (Sr.)
5	94	Chuck Barnett^{#}	G	United States	Houston Rockets	Oklahoma (Sr.)
5	95	Roger Stieg^{#}	F	United States	Indiana Pacers	Ole Miss (Sr.)
5	96	Chris Logan^{#}	F	United States	Cleveland Cavaliers	Holy Cross (Sr.)
5	97	Manute Bol	C	Sudan	San Diego Clippers (Pick voided on technicalities)	(Sudan)
5	98	Tim Andree^{#}	C	United States	Chicago Bulls	Notre Dame (Sr.)
5	99	Greg Hines^{#}	F	United States	Golden State Warriors	Hampton (Sr.)
5	100	Matt Clark^{#}	G	United States	Utah Jazz	Oklahoma State (Sr.)
5	101	Ken Austin	PF	United States	Detroit Pistons	Rice (Sr.)
5	102	Jim Lampley	C	United States	Dallas Mavericks	Arkansas–Little Rock (Sr.)
5	103	Robin Dixon^{#}	G	United States	Washington Bullets	New Hampshire (Sr.)
5	104	Charles Jones^{#}	F	United States	Atlanta Hawks	Oklahoma (Sr.)
5	105	Troy Lee Mikell^{#}	G	United States	New York Knicks	East Tennessee State (Sr.)
5	106	Lorenza Andrews^{#}	G	United States	Kansas City Kings	Oklahoma State (Sr.)
5	107	James Braddock^{#}	G	United States	Denver Nuggets	North Carolina (Sr.)
5	108	Gary Monroe^{#}	F	United States	Portland Trail Blazers	Wright State (Sr.)
5	109	Brad Watson^{#}	G	United States	Seattle SuperSonics	Washington (Sr.)
5	110	Tyren Naulls^{#}	G	United States	New Jersey Nets	Texas A&M (Sr.)
5	111	Mark Petteway^{#}	F	United States	Milwaukee Bucks	New Orleans (Sr.)
5	112	Jeff Pehl^{#}	F	United States	San Antonio Spurs	Richmond (Sr.)
5	113	Rick Lamb^{#}	C	United States	Phoenix Suns	Illinois State (Sr.)
5	114	Bob Reitz^{#}	G	United States	Boston Celtics	Stonehill (Sr.)
5	115	Danny Dixon^{#}	G	United States	Los Angeles Lakers	Alabama A&M (Sr.)
5	116	Mike Milligan^{#}	F	United States	Philadelphia 76ers	Tennessee State (Sr.)
6	117	Jim Stack^{#}	F	United States	Houston Rockets	Northwestern (Sr.)
6	118	Cliff Pruitt^{#}	F	United States	Indiana Pacers	UAB (Sr.)
6	119	Mel McLaughlin^{#}	G	United States	Cleveland Cavaliers	Central Michigan (Sr.)
6	120	Russell Todd^{#}	F	United States	Milwaukee Bucks	West Virginia (Sr.)
6	121	Ernest Patterson^{#}	G	United States	Chicago Bulls	New Mexico State (Sr.)
6	122	Fred Gilliam^{#}	F	United States	Utah Jazz	Clemson (Sr.)
6	123	Tom Heywood^{#}	C	United States	Golden State Warriors	Weber State (Sr.)
6	124	Derek Perry^{#}	F	United States	Detroit Pistons	Michigan State (Sr.)
6	125	Billy Allen^{#}	G	United States	Dallas Mavericks	Nevada (Sr.)
6	126	Donald Carroll^{#}	F	United States	Washington Bullets	St. Augustine's (Sr.)
6	127	Tom Bethea^{#}	G	United States	Atlanta Hawks	Richmond (Sr.)
6	128	Tony Simms^{#}	G	Canada	New York Knicks	Boston University (Sr.)
6	129	Glenn Green^{#}	F	United States	Denver Nuggets	Murray State (Sr.)
6	130	Alvis Rogers^{#}	F	United States	Kansas City Kings	Wake Forest (Sr.)
6	131	Derrick Pope^{#}	F	United States	Portland Trail Blazers	Montana (Sr.)
6	132	Tony Wilson^{#}	F	United States	Seattle SuperSonics	Western Kentucky (Sr.)
6	133	Oscar Taylor^{#}	F	United States	New Jersey Nets	New Orleans (Sr.)
6	134	Charles Hurt^{#}	F	United States	Milwaukee Bucks	Kentucky (Sr.)
6	135	Edward Bona^{#}	F	Sudan	Phoenix Suns	Fordham (Sr.)
6	136	Ricky Hooker^{#}	G	United States	San Antonio Spurs	St. Mary's (Texas) (Sr.)
6	137	Paul Atkins^{#}	F	United States	Boston Celtics	Dallas Baptist (Sr.)
6	138	Mark Steele^{#}	F	United States	Los Angeles Lakers	Colorado State (Sr.)
6	139	Sedale Threatt	SG	United States	Philadelphia 76ers	West Virginia Tech (Sr.)
7	140	Brian Kellerman^{#}	G	United States	Houston Rockets	Idaho (Sr.)
7	141	Tony Brown^{#}	G	United States	Indiana Pacers	Indiana (Sr.)
7	142	John Colombo^{#}	G	United States	Cleveland Cavaliers	John Carroll (Sr.)
7	143	Dan Evans^{#}	F	United States	San Diego Clippers	Oregon State (Sr.)
7	144	Jacque Hill^{#}	G	United States	Chicago Bulls	USC (Sr.)
7	145	Peter Williams^{#}	F	United States	Golden State Warriors	Utah (Sr.)
7	146	Gerald Kazanowski^{#}	F	Canada	Utah Jazz	Victoria (Sr.)
7	147	Rob Gonzalez^{#}	F	United States	Detroit Pistons	Colorado (Sr.)
7	148	Terrell Schlundt^{#}	F	United States	Dallas Mavericks	Marquette (Sr.)
7	149	Danny Womack^{#}	G	United States	Washington Bullets	Winston-Salem State (Sr.)
7	150	Lex Drum^{#}	C	United States	Atlanta Hawks	UAB (Sr.)
7	151	Desi Barmore^{#}	F	Israel	New York Knicks	Fresno State (Sr.)
7	152	Dane Suttle	SG	United States	Kansas City Kings	Pepperdine (Sr.)
7	153	Maurice McDaniel^{#}	C	United States	Denver Nuggets	Catawba (Sr.)
7	154	Paul Little^{#}	F	United States	Portland Trail Blazers	Penn (Sr.)
7	155	Tony Gattis^{#}	F	United States	Seattle SuperSonics	Mercer (Sr.)
7	156	Keith Bennett^{#}	F	United States; Israel	New Jersey Nets	Sacred Heart (Sr.)
7	157	Anthony Hicks^{#}	G	United States	Milwaukee Bucks	Xavier (Sr.)
7	158	Keith Williams^{#}	C	United States	San Antonio Spurs	Oklahoma Panhandle State (Sr.)
7	159	Fred Brown^{#}	G	United States	Phoenix Suns	VCU (Sr.)
7	160	Ron Jackson^{#}	G	United States	Boston Celtics	Providence (Sr.)
7	161	Ricky Mixon^{#}	G	United States	Los Angeles Lakers	Cal State Fullerton (Sr.)
7	162	Tony Bruin^{#}	F	United States	Philadelphia 76ers	Syracuse (Sr.)
8	163	Jeff Bolding^{#}	F	United States	Houston Rockets	Arkansas State (Sr.)
8	164	Ray McCallum^{#}	G	United States	Indiana Pacers	Ball State (Sr.)
8	165	Larry Tucker^{#}	F	United States	Cleveland Cavaliers	Lewis (Sr.)
8	166	Mark Gannon^{#}	F	United States	San Diego Clippers	Iowa (Sr.)
8	167	Terry Bradley^{#}	F	United States	Milwaukee Bucks	Chicago State (Sr.)
8	168	Michael McCombs^{#}	F	United States	Utah Jazz	Santa Fe (New Mexico) (Sr.)
8	169	Doug Harris^{#}	F	United States	Golden State Warriors	Central Washington (Sr.)
8	170	George Wenzel^{#}	F	United States	Detroit Pistons	Augustana College (Illinois) (Sr.)
8	171	Bill Sadler^{#}	F	United States	Dallas Mavericks	Pepperdine (Sr.)
8	172	Bernard Perry^{#}	G	United States	Washington Bullets	Howard (Sr.)
8	173	George Thomas^{#}	G	United States	Atlanta Hawks	Georgia Tech (Sr.)
8	174	Mike Lang^{#}	F	United States	New York Knicks	Penn Staet (Sr.)
8	175	Cliff Tribus^{#}	F	United States	Milwaukee Bucks	Davidson (Sr.)
8	176	Preston Neumayr^{#}	G	United States	Kansas City Kings	UC Davis (Sr.)
8	177	Frank Smith^{#}	C	United States	Portland Trail Blazers	Arizona (Sr.)
8	178	Ray Smith^{#}	F	United States	Seattle SuperSonics	Armstrong Atlantic State (Sr.)
8	179	Joey Myers^{#}	F	United States	New Jersey Nets	Duquesne (Sr.)
8	180	Brett Burkholder^{#}	C	United States	Milwaukee Bucks	DePaul (Sr.)
8	181	Mike Mulquin^{#}	F	United States	Phoenix Suns	Villanova (Sr.)
8	182	Norvell Brown^{#}	G	United States	San Antonio Spurs	Oklahoma Christian (Sr.)
8	183	Trent Johnson^{#}	F	United States	Boston Celtics	Pittsburgh (Sr.)
8	184	Gordon Austin^{#}	G	United States	Philadelphia 76ers	American (Sr.)
9	185	James Campbell^{#}	G	United States	Houston Rockets	Oklahoma Christian (Sr.)
9	186	Lynn Mitchem^{#}	F	United States	Indiana Pacers	Butler (Sr.)
9	187	Joe Brown^{#}	F	United States	Cleveland Cavaliers	Georgia State (Sr.)
9	188	David Maxwell^{#}	G	United States	San Diego Clippers	Fordham (Sr.)
9	189	Kenneth Orange^{#}	C	United States	Chicago Bulls	Oklahoma Christian (Sr.)
9	190	Greg Goorjian^{#}	G	United States	Golden State Warriors	Loyola Marymount (Sr.)
9	191	Ron Webb^{#}	F	United States	Utah Jazz	Oklahoma Christian (Sr.)
9	192	Marlow McLain^{#}	G	United States	Detroit Pistons	Eastern Michigan (Sr.)
9	193	Sherrod Arnold^{#}	G	United States	Dallas Mavericks	Chicago State (Sr.)
9	194	Ricky Moreland^{#}	F	United States	Washington Bullets	UMBC (Sr.)
9	195	Will Cotchery^{#}	G	United States	Atlanta Hawks	West Alabama (Sr.)
9	196	Charles Jones^{#}	C	United States	New York Knicks	Marshall (Sr.)
9	197	Bernard Hill^{#}	F	United States	Kansas City Kings	Oklahoma Panhandle State (Sr.)
9	198	Bobby Van Noy^{#}	F	United States	Denver Nuggets	Catawba (Sr.)
9	199	Phil Hopson^{#}	F	United States	Portland Trail Blazers	Idaho (Sr.)
9	200	Tony Washington^{#}	G	United States	Seattle SuperSonics	Hampton (Sr.)
9	201	Kevin Black^{#}	F	United States	New Jersey Nets	Rutgers (Sr.)
9	202	Bill Varner^{#}	F	United States	Milwaukee Bucks	Notre Dame (Sr.)
9	203	Gary Gaspard^{#}	G	United States	San Antonio Spurs	St. Mary's (Texas) (Sr.)
9	204	Joe Dykstra^{#}	F	United States	Phoenix Suns	Western Illinois (Sr.)
9	205	John Rice^{#}	G	United States	Boston Celtics	UMass Boston (Sr.)
9	206	Charles Fisher^{#}	G	United States	Philadelphia 76ers	James Madison (Sr.)
10	Houston Rockets (forfeited due to selection of ineligible player) (Note: The Rockets selected Darrell Johnson of the San Jose State Spartans who was a junior and ineligible for the draft because he had not declared hardship status.)					
10	207	Mark Smed^{#}	F	Germany; United States	Indiana Pacers	Augustana College (South Dakota) (Sr.)
10	208	Joe Hanley^{#}	F	United States	Cleveland Cavaliers	Xavier (Sr.)
10	209	Keith Smith^{#}	G	United States	San Diego Clippers	San Diego State (Sr.)
10	210	Tom Emma^{#}	G	United States	Chicago Bulls	Duke (Sr.)
10	211	Odell Mosteller^{#}	G	United States	Utah Jazz	Auburn (Sr.)
10	212	Michael Zeno^{#}	C	United States	Golden State Warriors	Long Beach State (Sr.)
10	213	Ike Person^{#}	F	United States	Detroit Pistons	Michigan (Sr.)
10	214	Clyde Corley^{#}	F	United States	Dallas Mavericks	FIU (Sr.)
10	215	Isaiah Singletary^{#}	G	United States	Washington Bullets	Saint Louis (Sr.)
10	216	Ronnie Carr^{#}	G	United States	Atlanta Hawks	Western Carolina (Sr.)
10	217	Bernard Randolph^{#}	F	United States	New York Knicks	DePaul (Sr.)
10	218	Cleveland McCrae^{#}	F	United States	Denver Nuggets	Catawba (Sr.)
10	219	Aaron Haskins^{#}	F	United States	Kansas City Kings	Washington State (Sr.)
10	220	Russ Christianson^{#}	F	United States	Portland Trail Blazers	Eastern Oregon (Sr.)
10	221	David Binion^{#}	F	United States	Seattle SuperSonics	North Carolina Central (Sr.)
10	222	Rich Simkus^{#}	C	United States	New Jersey Nets	Princeton (Sr.)
10	223	Bob Kelly^{#}	G	United States	Milwaukee Bucks	St. John's (Sr.)
10	224	Bo Overton^{#}	G	United States	Phoenix Suns	Oklahoma (Sr.)
10	225	Lamar Heard^{#}	F	United States	San Antonio Spurs	Georgia (Sr.)
10	226	Andy Kupec^{#}	G	United States	Milwaukee Bucks	Bentley (Sr.)
10	Philadelphia 76ers (forfeited due to selection of ineligible player) (Note: The 76ers selected Norman Horvitz, the medical director of Nutrisystem and a friend of 76ers owner Harold Katz. Horvitz had graduated from the Philadelphia College of Pharmacy and Science in 1956 and was declared ineligible by the NBA because he had been out of college for more than 27 years. Excluding later draft selections of players from the Soviet Union, Horvitz would be the last person the NBA considered to be an ineligible draft selection.)					

*Compensation for draft choices previously traded away by Ted Stepien.

== Early entrants ==
=== College underclassmen ===
For the fifth time in six years, no college underclassman would withdraw their entry into the NBA draft. This time, only six college underclassmen would declare their entry into the draft. The following college basketball players successfully applied for early draft entrance.

- (United States) Russell Cross – F, Purdue (junior)
- (United States) Clyde Drexler – G/F, Houston (junior)
- (United States) Derek Harper – G, Illinois (junior)
- (United States) Doc Rivers – G, Marquette (junior)
- (United States) Byron Scott – G, Arizona State (junior)
- (United States) Ennis Whatley – G, Alabama (sophomore)

== Invited attendees ==
The 1983 NBA draft is considered to be the sixth NBA draft to have utilized what's properly considered the "green room" experience for NBA prospects. The NBA's green room is a staging area where anticipated draftees often sit with their families and representatives, waiting for their names to be called on draft night. Often being positioned either in front of or to the side of the podium (in this case, being positioned in the Madison Square Garden's Felt Forum for the second year in a row), once a player heard his name, he would walk to the podium to shake hands and take promotional photos with the NBA commissioner. From there, the players often conducted interviews with various media outlets while backstage. However, once the NBA draft started to air nationally on TV starting with the 1980 NBA draft, the green room evolved from players waiting to hear their name called and then shaking hands with these select players who were often called to the hotel to take promotional pictures with the NBA commissioner a day or two after the draft concluded to having players in real-time waiting to hear their names called up and then shaking hands with Larry O'Brien, the NBA's commissioner at the time. The NBA compiled its list of green room invites through collective voting by the NBA's team presidents and general managers alike, which in this year's case belonged to only what they believed were the top 13 prospects at the time. However, two of the invitations to the draft in Sidney Lowe and Dereck Whittenburg would end up staying in the green room by not just the second round, but by as late as the third round at the 51st round, with Whittenburg being the latest selection for a natural, day one draftee invite as of 2025. Not only that, but Whittenburg would be the first invite to never play a single NBA game after being drafted following his invitation, as well as be the only invite drafted into the third round back when the NBA draft would go beyond just two rounds starting in 1989. Even so, the following players were invited to attend this year's draft festivities live and in person.

- (United States) Thurl Bailey – PF, North Carolina State
- (United States) Antoine Carr – PF, Wichita State
- (United States) Clyde Drexler – SG, Houston
- (Canada) Stewart Granger – PG, Villanova
- (United States) Sidney Green – PG, UNLV
- (United States) Roy Hinson – C, Rutgers
- (United States) Sidney Lowe – PG, North Carolina State
- (United States) Rodney McCray – SF, Louisville
- (United States) Ralph Sampson – C, Virginia
- (United States) Steve Stipanovich – C, Missouri
- (United States) Darrell Walker – SG, Arkansas
- (United States) Dereck Whittenburg – PG, North Carolina State
- (United States) Randy Wittman – SG, Indiana

== See also ==
- List of first overall NBA draft picks
