= Dana Jones (basketball) =

American basketball player

Personal information
- Born: April 16, 1972 (age 53); Los Angeles County, California, U.S.
- Listed height: 6 ft 7 in (2.01 m)

Career information
- High school: North Hollywood (Los Angeles, California)
- College: Pepperdine (1990–1994)
- NBA draft: 1994: undrafted
- Playing career: 1994–2001
- Position: Small forward
- Number: 21

Career highlights
- WCC Player of the Year (1993); 3× First-team All-WCC (1992–1994)

Dana L. Jones (born April 16, 1972) is a retired American basketball player. He was a conference player of the year at Pepperdine University and played professionally in Japan for seven years.

== College career ==
Jones, a 6'7 small forward from North Hollywood High School in Los Angeles, California, played college basketball at Pepperdine, where he was a four-time all-West Coast Conference pick. As a freshman, Jones averaged 10 points per game on .578 shooting and 8.2 rebounds per game as he won the WCC freshman of the year award. As a sophomore in the 1991–92 season, Jones upped his scoring average to 11.4 points on .583 shooting and was named first team all-conference. He and senior Doug Christie led the Waves to an undefeated WCC season and their second straight NCAA tournament appearance that year.

As a junior the following season, Jones averaged 15.6 points on 62% shooting and collected 9.1 rebounds and was named West Coast Conference player of the year for 1993. In the 1993–94 season, Jones again raised his scoring average to 18.4 points per game and averaged 9.7 rebounds per contest. He was named first team all-conference for the third consecutive year and led the Waves back to their third NCAA appearance in his four years as he averaged 22 points and 10 rebounds in the 1994 WCC tournament and was named tournament most valuable player.

Dana Jones finished his Pepperdine career as the school's second leading scorer all-time (1,677 points). He also left as the school's all-time leader in rebounds (1,031), steals (211) and double-doubles (39). He finished second in Pepperdine history in field goal percentage at .585.

== Professional career ==
After graduating from Pepperdine in 1994, Jones was not drafted in the 1994 NBA draft. He ultimately settled in Japan, playing for the Sumitomo Metal Sparks, NKK Sea Hawks and Panasonic Kangaroos of the Japan Basketball League between 1995–96 and 2000–01. He was named an All-Star and league defensive player of the year in 1997. Injuries ended Jones' career in 2001. He was inducted into the Pepperdine Athletic hall of fame in 2010.
