= 1985–86 Gonzaga Bulldogs men's basketball team =

American college basketball season

1985–86 Gonzaga Bulldogs men's basketball
- Conference: West Coast Athletic Conference
- Record: 15–13 (4–8 WCAC)
- Head coach: Dan Fitzgerald (4th season)
- Home arena: Kennedy Pavilion

1985–86 West Coast Athletic Conference men's basketball standings
	Conf.				Overall
Team	W		L	PCT	W		L	PCT
Pepperdine	13	–	1	.929	25	–	5	.833
Loyola Marymount	10	–	4	.714	19	–	11	.633
San Diego	9	–	5	.643	19	–	9	.679
Gonzaga	8	–	6	.571	15	–	13	.536
Santa Clara	7	–	7	.500	12	–	16	.429
Portland	4	–	10	.286	13	–	15	.464
Saint Mary's	3	–	11	.214	10	–	17	.370
San Francisco	2	–	12	.143	7	–	21	.250
Rankings from AP Poll

The 1985–86 Gonzaga Bulldogs men's basketball team represented Gonzaga University of Spokane, Washington, in the 1985–86 NCAA Division I men's basketball season. Led by fourth-year head coach Dan Fitzgerald, the Bulldogs were 15–13 (.536) overall (4–8 in WCAC, 5th), and played their home games on campus at Kennedy Pavilion.

After four years away from the bench, athletic director Fitzgerald resumed his former role as head coach.
