= Michael Holton =

American basketball player and coach (born 1961)

Personal information
- Born: August 4, 1961 (age 65) Seattle, Washington, U.S.
- Listed height: 6 ft 4 in (1.93 m)
- Listed weight: 185 lb (84 kg)

Career information
- High school: Pasadena (Pasadena, California)
- College: UCLA (1979–1983)
- NBA draft: 1983: 3rd round, 53rd overall pick
- Drafted by: Golden State Warriors
- Playing career: 1983–1992
- Position: Point guard / shooting guard
- Number: 15, 10, 32, 6

Career history

Playing
- 1983–1984: Puerto Rico Coquis
- 1984–1985: Phoenix Suns
- 1985–1986: Florida Stingers
- 1986: Chicago Bulls
- 1986–1988: Portland Trail Blazers
- 1988–1990: Charlotte Hornets
- 1990–1991: Tulsa Fast Breakers
- 1991–1992: Tri-City Chinook

Coaching
- 2001–2006: University of Portland

Career highlights
- Fourth-team Parade All-American (1979)
- Stats at NBA.com
- Stats at Basketball Reference

Michael David Holton (born August 4, 1961) is an American former professional basketball player, and current television studio analyst for the Portland Trail Blazers of the NBA. Born in Seattle, Washington, he played college basketball for the UCLA Bruins from 1979 to 1983, and was selected in the third round of the 1983 NBA draft by the Golden State Warriors, but began his NBA career with the Phoenix Suns in 1984–85. Holton, a 6-foot-4-inch (1.93 m), 185-pound (84 kg) guard, also spent his career with the Chicago Bulls, Portland Trail Blazers, and Charlotte Hornets. He also played in the CBA for four teams in as many seasons from 1983 to 1992. He started 60 games for the expansion Charlotte Hornets. Holton briefly played for Great Taste Coffee in the Philippine Basketball Association.

== Coaching career ==
In 2001, Holton became head coach of the University of Portland men's basketball team, where he had served as an assistant coach in 1994–95. He was also an assistant coach at Pasadena City College in 1993–94, at Oregon State University in 1995–96, and at UCLA from 1996 until 2001.

Holton was fired in March 2006 after leading the Portland Pilots to a 54–91 win–loss record over five seasons. He still had three years remaining on his contract.

In 2013, Holton became coach of the MAC Masters basketball team, where he has earned two PCAC titles and a 2013 National Championship.

== Broadcasting career ==
Holton began serving as a television analyst for the Portland Trail Blazers in 2007. On July 22, 2026, Holton was let go by Portland as a part of mass layoffs within the organization.

== Career statistics ==
Legend
GP	Games played	GS	Games started	MPG	Minutes per game
FG%	Field goal percentage	3P%	3-point field goal percentage	FT%	Free throw percentage
RPG	Rebounds per game	APG	Assists per game	SPG	Steals per game
BPG	Blocks per game	PPG	Points per game	**Bold**	Career high

=== NBA ===
==== Regular season ====
Year	Team	GP	GS	MPG	FG%	3P%	FT%	RPG	APG	SPG	BPG	PPG
1984–85	Phoenix	74	59	23.8	.446	**.311**	.814	**1.8**	2.7	.8	.1	**8.4**
1985–86	Phoenix	4	0	16.3	.200	.000	.667	.8	1.8	.5	.0	3.0
1985–86	Chicago	24	0	18.6	.471	.100	.632	1.3	2.0	**1.0**	.0	7.1
1986–87	Portland	58	1	8.3	.409	.304	.800	.7	1.3	.3	.0	3.3
1987–88	Portland	**82**	2	15.6	.462	.200	.829	**1.8**	2.6	.5	.1	5.3
1988–89	Charlotte	67	**60**	**25.3**	.427	.214	**.839**	1.6	**6.3**	**1.0**	**.2**	8.3
1989–90	Charlotte	16	0	6.8	**.538**	–	.500	.1	1.0	.1	.0	1.8
Career		325	122	18.0	.441	.257	.807	1.4	3.0	.6	.1	6.2

==== Playoffs ====
Year	Team	GP	GS	MPG	FG%	3P%	FT%	RPG	APG	SPG	BPG	PPG
1985	Phoenix	3	0	**18.3**	.474	.000	**1.000**	.7	**3.0**	.0	.0	**7.3**
1987	Portland	2	0	4.5	**.500**	–	–	.5	.0	.0	.0	1.0
1988	Portland	**4**	0	8.5	.231	.000	–	**1.3**	1.5	**.5**	0	1.5
Career		9	0	10.9	.382	.000	1.000	.9	1.7	.2	.0	3.3

== Head coaching record ==
Record table
Season	Team	Overall	Conference	Standing	Postseason
Portland (West Coast Conference) (2001–2006)
2001–02	Portland	6–24	2–12	T–7th	
2002–03	Portland	11–17	4–10	T–6th	
2003–04	Portland	11–17	5–9	T–6th	
2004–05	Portland	15–15	4–10	7th	
2005–06	Portland	11–18	5–9	T–6th	
Portland:		54–91	20–50		
Total:		54–91			
National champion Postseason invitational champion Conference regular season champion Conference regular season and conference tournament champion Division regular season champion Division regular season and conference tournament champion Conference tournament champion
