= Jon Korfas =

Greek-American professional basketball player and coach

Personal information
- Born: August 21, 1962 (age 64) Akron, Ohio, U.S.
- Listed height: 5 ft 11 in (1.80 m)
- Listed weight: 165 lb (75 kg)

Career information
- High school: San Marcos (Santa Barbara, California)
- College: USC (1981–1982); Pepperdine (1983–1986)
- NBA draft: 1986: undrafted
- Playing career: 1986–2001
- Position: Point guard
- Number: 10

Career history

Playing
- 1986–1995: PAOK Thessaloniki
- 1995–1997: Panathinaikos Athens
- 1997–1998: Iraklio Crete
- 1998–2000: Maroussi Athens
- 2000–2001: Papagou Athens

Coaching
- 2000–2001: Papagou Athens
- 2007–2008: PAOK Thessaloniki
- 2008–2009: Apollon Kalamarias
- 2010–2012: HAN Thessaloniki

Career highlights
- As player: FIBA Intercontinental Cup champion (1996); FIBA EuroLeague champion (1996); FIBA European Cup Winners' Cup champion (1991); FIBA Korać Cup champion (1994); Greek League champion (1992); 2× Greek Cup winner (1995, 1996); Greek League All-Star (1991); Greek League assists leader (1990); Greek League Hall of Fame (2023); 2× West Coast Athletic Conference champion (1985, 1986); All-West Coast Athletic Conference Honorable Mention (1985)
Medals
Men's basketball
Representing Greece
FIBA EuroBasket
Silver medal – second place	1989 Yugoslavia

Jon Anthony Korfas (alternate spelling: John, Greek: Τζον Κόρφας; born August 21, 1962) is a Greek-American former professional basketball player and coach. During his professional playing career, Korfas won all three of the FIBA Europe continental-wide titles on the club level. With Panathinaikos Athens, he won the top-tier level FIBA EuroLeague championship, during the 1995–96 season. He also won the second-tier level FIBA European Cup Winners' Cup championship in the 1990–91 season, and the third-tier level FIBA Korać Cup championship in the 1993–94 season with PAOK Thessaloniki. With Panathinaikos, he also won the world club title, as he won the 1996 edition of the FIBA Intercontinental Cup. He was also selected to the FIBA EuroLeague All-Final Four Team at the 1993 FIBA EuroLeague Final Four.

As a player, his nickname was Tintin. During his playing days, Korfas became well known in Europe, due to his very unusual one-handed jump shot. He was inducted into the Greek Basket League Hall of Fame in 2023.

== High school ==
Korfas began his basketball playing career as a key member of the San Marcos High School basketball team, of Santa Barbara, California, US. He won three Channel League championships in 1979, 1980, and 1981. In his junior and senior seasons, the team had a combined regular season record of 50–2. During the 1980–81 season, he led the high school's basketball team, which were known as the Runnin' Royals at that time, to a perfect 26–0 regular season record. They advanced to the California Interscholastic Federation (CIF)'s 1981 Finals, where they were defeated by Long Beach Poly, by a score of 65–63.

On an individual level, Korfas was named to the All-Channel League First Team in the years 1979, 1980, and 1981. He was also voted the Most Valuable Player of the Channel League in 1980 and 1981. He was also an All-California Interscholastic Federation Second Team selection in 1979 and 1980, and an All-California Interscholastic Federation First Team selection in 1981.

== College career ==
After high school, Korfas played college basketball in the United States, at USC and at Pepperdine University. He played with the USC Trojans, during the 1981–82 season.

After that, he played with the Pepperdine Waves, during the 1983–84, 1984–85, and 1985–86 seasons. While at Pepperdine, Korfas won the West Coast Athletic Conference championship in the years 1985 and 1986. He was an All-West Coast Athletic Conference Honorable Mention selection in 1985.

== Professional career ==
Korfas began his pro club playing career with the Greek League club PAOK Thessaloniki. With PAOK, he won Europe's secondary level FIBA European Cup championship in the 1990–91 season, the Greek League championship in the 1991–92 season, the European third-tier level FIBA Korać Cup championship in the 1993–94 season, and the Greek Cup title in the 1994–95 season. With PAOK, Korfas was also a FIBA European Cup finalist in the 1991–92 season, and a Greek Cup finalist in the 1988–89, 1989–90, and 1990–91 seasons. He also took the third place with PAOK, at the 1993 FIBA EuroLeague Final Four, which was held in Athens, while also being selected to the FIBA EuroLeague All-Final Four Team in the process.

After leaving PAOK in 1995, Korfas played with the Greek club Panathinaikos Athens. With Panathinaikos, he won the Greek Cup title, the championship of Europe's top-tier level FIBA EuroLeague competition, and the World Club Championship, all in the same year. As he won the 1996 Greek Cup Final, the 1996 FIBA EuroLeague Final Four, and the 1996 FIBA Intercontinental Cup competition.

In 1998, Korfas moved to the Greek club Maroussi Athens. With Maroussi, he took third place at the 2000 Greek Cup Final Four.

== National team career ==
Korfas was a part of the senior men's Greek national team. He first played with Greece, under the name of Ioannis Korfas, in 1988, when he competed at the 1989 FIBA EuroBasket qualifiers. He also played with Greece in 1989, during that year's FIBA EuroBasket preparation games, including playing at the pre-EuroBasket Acropolis International Prep Tournament.

He was finally selected to Greece's 1989 FIBA EuroBasket team. Greece won the tournament's silver medal. However, he did not play in any of the tournament's game after an appeal from the French Federation. With Greece, Korfas had a total of 9 caps, in which he scored a total of 68 points, for a scoring average of 7.6 points per game. He also played with Greece in an additional game, as he played with Greece against an Atlantic Coast Conference College All-Star selection team, which Greece won by a score of 88–81.

== Coaching career ==
After he retired from playing pro club basketball, Korfas worked as a basketball coach. He was the head coach of the Greek clubs Papagou Athens, PAOK Thessaloniki, Apollon Kalamarias, and HAN Thessaloniki.

== Personal life ==
Korfas was born in Akron, Ohio, to a Greek father and an American mother. His father was originally from island Zakynthos. He has two children, Stef and Patricia. Stef was an NCAA Division II men's college basketball player at Clayton State University.

== Awards and accomplishments ==
=== Pro career ===
- Greek League Assists Leader: (1990)
- Greek League All-Star: (1991)
- FIBA Cup European Winners' Cup Champion: (1991)
- Greek League Champion: (1992)
- FIBA EuroLeague All-Final Four Team: (1993)
- FIBA Korać Cup Champion: (1994)
- 2× Greek Cup Winner: (1995, 1996)
- FIBA EuroLeague Champion: (1996)
- FIBA Intercontinental Cup Champion: (1996)
- Greek League Hall of Fame: (2023)

=== Greek senior national team ===
- Acropolis International Tournament Champion: (1989)
- FIBA EuroBasket: Silver (1989)

=== College career ===
- 2× West Coast Athletic Conference Champion: (1985, 1986)
- All-West Coast Athletic Conference Honorable Mention: (1985)

=== High school career ===
- 3× Channel League Champion: (1979, 1980, 1981)
- 3× All-Channel League First Team: (1979, 1980, 1981)
- 2× Channel League MVP: (1980, 1981)
- 2× All-California Interscholastic Federation Second Team: (1979, 1980)
- All-California Interscholastic Federation First Team: (1981)
