= Brandon Armstrong (basketball) =

American basketball player (born 1980)

Personal information
- Born: June 16, 1980 (age 46) San Francisco, California, U.S.
- Listed height: 6 ft 5 in (1.96 m)
- Listed weight: 185 lb (84 kg)

Career information
- High school: Vallejo (Vallejo, California)
- College: Pepperdine (1999–2001)
- NBA draft: 2001: 1st round, 23rd overall pick
- Drafted by: Houston Rockets
- Playing career: 2001–2009
- Position: Shooting guard
- Number: 1

Career history
- 2001–2004: New Jersey Nets
- 2005: Roseto Sharks
- 2006: Calpe Aguas
- 2006–2007: Dakota Wizards
- 2007: Bakersfield Jam
- 2007: Anaheim Arsenal
- 2007–2008: Kotwica Kołobrzeg
- 2008–2009: Budivelnyk

Career highlights
- 2× First-team All-WCC (2000, 2001)
- Stats at NBA.com
- Stats at Basketball Reference

Brandon Simone Armstrong (born June 16, 1980) is an American former professional basketball player. Born in San Francisco, California, he played college basketball for the Pepperdine Waves and was selected by the Houston Rockets with the 23rd overall pick of the 2001 NBA draft. He was traded to the New Jersey Nets, where he played three seasons in the NBA. He later played in Italy, Spain, Poland and Ukraine, and spent a season in the NBA D-League.

== Professional career ==
Armstrong was selected by the Houston Rockets with the 23rd overall pick of the 2001 NBA draft. He was traded along with fellow Rockets draft picks Richard Jefferson and Jason Collins to the New Jersey Nets in exchange for the draft rights to New Jersey's Eddie Griffin. In three seasons with the Nets, Armstrong averaged 2.2 points per game. He only played 17 games in 2002–03 due to suffering from regular back pain. He was subsequently not on the 2003 playoff roster.

Armstrong became a free agent in 2004 and signed with the Golden State Warriors, but was waived prior to the start of the 2004–05 NBA season. Armstrong's final NBA game was played in Game 7 of the Eastern Conference Semi-Finals on May 20, 2004. In that game, the Nets would drop the series to the Detroit Pistons by losing the game 69 - 90. Armstrong played for 4 minutes and the only stat he recorded was 1 assist.

For the 2005–06 season, Armstrong moved to Italy to play for Roseto Basket. He left the team in November 2005 after appearing in seven games. In February 2006, he moved to Spain and played 10 games for Calpe Aguas.

On November 2, 2006, Armstorng was selected by the Dakota Wizards in the third round of the NBA Development League draft. He was waived by the Wizards on January 20, 2007. He was acquired by the Bakersfield Jam on February 8 but then waived on February 28. He was then acquired by the Anaheim Arsenal on March 15 but then waived again on March 26.

For the 2007–08 season, Armstrong moved to Poland to play for Kotwica Kołobrzeg. In 26 games, he averaged 11.2 points per game.

For the 2008–09 season, Armstrong moved to Ukraine to play for Budivelnyk. His last game for Budivelnyk was on January 9, 2009.

In February 2009, Armstrong trialed with Marinos de Anzoátegui of the Venezuelan Liga Profesional de Baloncesto. He was fighting for a position on the team with a fellow American Michael Gale, but he ultimately did not make the team and did not debut for Marinos.

== Career statistics ==
Legend
GP	Games played	GS	Games started	MPG	Minutes per game
FG%	Field goal percentage	3P%	3-point field goal percentage	FT%	Free throw percentage
RPG	Rebounds per game	APG	Assists per game	SPG	Steals per game
BPG	Blocks per game	PPG	Points per game	**Bold**	Career high

=== NBA ===
==== Regular season ====
Year	Team	GP	GS	MPG	FG%	3P%	FT%	RPG	APG	SPG	BPG	PPG
2001–02	New Jersey	35	0	5.6	.318	.294	.500	.5	.2	**.2**	.0	1.8
2002–03	New Jersey	17	0	4.1	.333	.167	**.833**	.2	.1	**.2**	**.1**	1.4
2003–04	New Jersey	**56**	0	**7.8**	**.371**	**.365**	.500	**.8**	**.3**	**.2**	.0	**2.7**
Career		108	0	6.5	.365	.333	.600	.6	.2	.2	.0	2.2

==== Playoffs ====
Year	Team	GP	GS	MPG	FG%	3P%	FT%	RPG	APG	SPG	BPG	PPG
2004	New Jersey	8	0	4.0	.250	.000	–	.3	.4	.1	.0	.8
