= Levy Middlebrooks =

American basketball player (born 1966)

Personal information
- Born: February 4, 1966 (age 60)
- Listed height: 6 ft 7 in (2.01 m)
- Listed weight: 244 lb (111 kg)

Career information
- High school: St. Ignatius Prep (San Francisco, California)
- College: Pepperdine (1984–1988)
- NBA draft: 1988: undrafted
- Playing career: 1988–2002
- Position: Power forward

Career history
- 1988–1989: Obradoiro CAB
- 1989–1991: Valvi Girona
- 1991–1992: Bakersfield Jammers
- 1992–1993: Pezoporikos Larnaca
- 1993–1997: Fighting Eagles Nagoya
- 1998–1999: MZT Skopje
- 1999: San Luis
- 2000: Olimpia Venado Tuerto
- 2000–2001: CB Tarragona
- 2001: Dorados de Chihuahua
- 2001: Tecolotes de la UAG
- 2002: Circuito Mexicano de Básquetbol

Career highlights
- WCAC Player of the Year (1988); 2× First-team All-WCAC (1987, 1988); WCAC Freshman of the Year (1985)

Levy Middlebrooks (born February 4, 1966) is an American former professional basketball player. He is best known for college career at Pepperdine University, however, from 1984 to 1988.

A native of San Francisco, California, Middlebrooks attended St. Ignatius College Preparatory and was a standout player for the Wildcats. He earned a scholarship to play for the Waves and thus he enrolled in the fall of 1984. During his freshman year he helped lead them to a West Coast Athletic Conference championship and a berth into the 1985 NCAA Tournament, where Pepperdine would lose in the first round. Middlebrooks was named the WCAC Freshman of the Year. The following season, the Waves once again won the WCAC, qualified for the 1986 NCAA Tournament, and lost in the first round. This would be Middlebrooks' last experience with the NCAA Tournament as the Waves did not make it during his junior season and only qualified for the 1988 National Invitation Tournament in his senior year. During his final two years, Middlebrooks led Pepperdine in rebounding with 9.0 and 10.7 rebounds per game, respectively. As a senior, he was named the WCAC Player of the Year, becoming the eighth player in school history at the time to garner this award.

After his collegiate career ended, Middlebrooks tried out with the Cleveland Cavaliers of the National Basketball Association. He was not selected in the subsequent NBA draft, and so he carved out a professional career which took him from the Continental Basketball Association to various teams in Mexico, Spain, Cyprus and Argentina. In Mexico, he played for Laguneros, Tecos UAG, and Dorados. In Spain, he played for Obradoiro, Girona and CB Tarragona, while in Cyprus he played for AEK Larnaca. He also played for MZT Skopje from Macedonia.
