= Anthony Frederick =

American basketball player

Personal information
- Born: August 7, 1964 Los Angeles, California, U.S.
- Died: May 29, 2003 (aged 38) Woodland Hills, California, U.S.
- Listed height: 6 ft 7 in (2.01 m)
- Listed weight: 205 lb (93 kg)

Career information
- High school: Gardena (Los Angeles, California)
- College: Santa Monica College (1982–1984); Pepperdine (1984–1986)
- NBA draft: 1986: 6th round, 133rd overall pick
- Drafted by: Denver Nuggets
- Playing career: 1986–1999
- Position: Small forward
- Number: 22, 41, 24

Career history
- 1986–1987: La Crosse Catbirds
- 1987–1988: Mississippi Jets
- 1988–1989: Indiana Pacers
- 1989–1990: Real Madrid
- 1990–1991: Oklahoma City Cavalry
- 1991: Sacramento Kings
- 1991–1992: Charlotte Hornets
- 1992–1993: Dinamo Sassari
- 1993–1994: Sato Aris
- 1994–1995: Rapid City Thrillers
- 1995–1996: Mitsubishi Diamond Dolphins
- 1998–1999: ALM Évreux
- 1999: Olympique Antibes

Career highlights
- All-CBA Second Team (1991); First-team All-WCAC (1985)
- Stats at NBA.com
- Stats at Basketball Reference

Anthony Frederick (August 7, 1964 – May 29, 2003) was an American professional basketball player. A 6'7" small forward from Santa Monica College and Pepperdine University, Frederick played in three NBA seasons. He played for the Indiana Pacers, Sacramento Kings and Charlotte Hornets. In his NBA career, Frederick played in 147 games and scored a total of 718 points. He was born in Los Angeles, California. He was selected by the Denver Nuggets in the sixth round (133rd pick overall) of the 1986 NBA draft.

In addition to his time in the NBA, Frederick played four seasons in the Continental Basketball Association (CBA) for the La Crosse Catbirds, Mississippi Jets, Oklahoma City Cavalry and Rapid City Thrillers. He was selected to the All-CBA Second Team in 1991.

Frederick died of an apparent heart attack on May 29, 2003, at the age of 38.

== Career statistics ==
Legend
GP	Games played	GS	Games started	MPG	Minutes per game
FG%	Field goal percentage	3P%	3-point field goal percentage	FT%	Free throw percentage
RPG	Rebounds per game	APG	Assists per game	SPG	Steals per game
BPG	Blocks per game	PPG	Points per game	**Bold**	Career high

=== NBA ===
==== Regular season ====
Year	Team	GP	GS	MPG	FG%	3P%	FT%	RPG	APG	SPG	BPG	PPG
1988–89	Indiana	46	0	6.8	**.504**	**.400**	.706	1.1	.4	.3	.1	3.3
1990–91	Sacramento	35	3	**13.6**	.399	–	**.717**	**2.4**	**1.3**	**.6**	**.4**	5.1
1991–92	Charlotte	**66**	**26**	12.9	.435	.235	.685	2.2	1.1	**.6**	**.4**	**5.9**
Career		147	29	11.2	.439	.273	.699	1.9	.9	.5	.3	4.9
