= Dane Suttle =

American basketball player (born 1961)

Personal information
- Born: August 9, 1961 (age 65) Los Angeles, California, U.S.
- Listed height: 6 ft 3 in (1.91 m)
- Listed weight: 190 lb (86 kg)

Career information
- High school: John C. Fremont (Los Angeles, California)
- College: Pepperdine (1979–1983)
- NBA draft: 1983: 7th round, 152nd overall pick
- Drafted by: Kansas City Kings
- Playing career: 1983–1986
- Position: Shooting guard
- Number: 2

Career history

Playing
- 1983–1984: Kansas City Kings
- 1985–1986: Florida Stingers
- 1986: Geelong Supercats

Coaching
- 2000–2001: San Diego Wildfire

Career highlights
- WCAC co-Player of the Year (1983); 2× First-team All-WCAC (1983, 1984)
- Stats at NBA.com
- Stats at Basketball Reference

Dane Lee Suttle (born August 9, 1961) is an American former professional basketball player, formerly of the National Basketball Association's Kansas City Kings. A 6'3 guard, Suttle was a star at Pepperdine University.

== Collegiate career ==
Suttle attended John C. Fremont High School in Los Angeles and committed to Pepperdine. Suttle played for the Waves from 1979 to 1983 and was a two-time West Coast Conference all-conference pick and the 1983 co-player of the year with teammate Orlando Phillips. While at Pepperdine, Suttle led the Waves to back to back NCAA tournament appearances in 1982 and 1983. Suttle left Pepperdine as the school's all-time leading scorer with 1,702 points.

One of the low points in his college career took place in the 1983 NCAA tournament. Pepperdine, the eleven seed in the West Region, faced North Carolina State in the first round and had been leading by six points in overtime. With twenty nine seconds left, Suttle was fouled and went to the free throw line for a one-and-one. He missed the first shot, enabling a change of possession with the Waves still leading by four. Suttle was fouled again on the inbound play and missed again, and North Carolina State would eventually score again on their own missed one-and-one the very next time they had the ball. The game went to a second overtime, where Suttle fouled out of the game and North Carolina State won on their road to the national championship.

== Professional career ==
After his senior season Suttle was drafted by the Kansas City Kings in the 7th round (152nd pick overall) in the 1983 NBA draft. He made the team and played in 46 games over the 1983–84 and 1984–85 seasons. Suttle averaged 5.9 points and 1.0 assists per game over his NBA career.

After Suttle's professional career ended, he became a private basketball tutor. His son, Dane Jr., followed in his footsteps, playing basketball at Pepperdine University.

== Career statistics ==
Legend
GP	Games played	GS	Games started	MPG	Minutes per game
FG%	Field goal percentage	3P%	3-point field goal percentage	FT%	Free throw percentage
RPG	Rebounds per game	APG	Assists per game	SPG	Steals per game
BPG	Blocks per game	PPG	Points per game	**Bold**	Career high

=== NBA ===
==== Regular season ====
Year	Team	GP	GS	MPG	FG%	3P%	FT%	RPG	APG	SPG	BPG	PPG
1983–84	Kansas City	**40**	**1**	**11.7**	**.509**	.000	.851	**1.2**	**1.2**	**.5**	.0	**6.5**
1984–85	Kansas City	6	0	4.0	.462	.000	**1.000**	.5	.3	.2	.0	2.3
Career		46	1	10.7	.507	.000	.857	1.1	1.0	.5	.0	5.9
