= Eric White (basketball) =

American basketball player

Personal information
- Born: December 30, 1965 (age 60) San Francisco, California, U.S.
- Listed height: 6 ft 8 in (2.03 m)
- Listed weight: 200 lb (91 kg)

Career information
- High school: Sacred Heart Cathedral Preparatory (San Francisco, California)
- College: Pepperdine (1983–1987)
- NBA draft: 1987: 3rd round, 65th overall pick
- Drafted by: Detroit Pistons
- Playing career: 1987–1991
- Position: Power forward
- Number: 12, 22

Career history
- 1987–1988: Mississippi Jets
- 1988: Los Angeles Clippers
- 1988: Estudiantes
- 1988–1989: Wichita Falls Texans
- 1989: Utah Jazz
- 1989: Los Angeles Clippers
- 1989–1991: Sioux Falls Skyforce
- 1991: Reims

Career highlights
- CBA All-Rookie Team (1988)
- Stats at NBA.com
- Stats at Basketball Reference

Eric Lance White (born December 30, 1965) is an American former professional basketball player. Born in San Francisco, he played collegiately at Pepperdine University from 1983 to 1987. He was listed as a 6-foot-8-inch (2.03 m), 200-pound (91 kg) power forward.

White was selected in the 3rd round with the 19th pick of the 1987 NBA draft by the Detroit Pistons. He played for the Mississippi Jets of the Continental Basketball Association (CBA) during the 1987–88 season and was selected to the CBA All-Rookie Team. From 1987 to 1989 he played in two NBA seasons, with the L.A. Clippers and the Utah Jazz, averaging 6.1 points and 2.4 rebounds per game. He was selected as an expansion draft pick by the Minnesota Timberwolves in 1989.

== Career statistics ==
Legend
GP	Games played	GS	Games started	MPG	Minutes per game
FG%	Field goal percentage	3P%	3-point field goal percentage	FT%	Free throw percentage
RPG	Rebounds per game	APG	Assists per game	SPG	Steals per game
BPG	Blocks per game	PPG	Points per game	**Bold**	Career high

=== NBA ===
==== Regular season ====
Year	Team	GP	GS	MPG	FG%	3P%	FT%	RPG	APG	SPG	BPG	PPG
1987–88	L.A. Clippers	17	**4**	**20.7**	**.532**	**1.000**	.789	**3.6**	**.5**	**.4**	**.2**	**10.5**
1988–89	Utah	1	0	2.0	.000	–	–	.0	.0	.0	.0	.0
1988–89	L.A. Clippers	**37**	0	11.7	.521	–	**.810**	1.9	**.5**	.3	.0	4.3
Career		55	4	14.3	.525	1.000	.798	2.4	.5	.3	.1	6.1
