= Dwayne Polee =

American basketball player and coach (born 1963)

San Francisco Dons
- Title: Director of player development
- League: West Coast Conference

Personal information
- Born: March 2, 1963 (age 63) Los Angeles, California, U.S.
- Listed height: 6 ft 5 in (1.96 m)
- Listed weight: 180 lb (82 kg)

Career information
- High school: Manual Arts (Los Angeles, California)
- College: UNLV (1981–1982); Pepperdine (1983–1986)
- NBA draft: 1986: 3rd round, 54th overall pick
- Drafted by: Los Angeles Clippers
- Playing career: 1986–1991
- Position: Shooting guard
- Number: 12
- Coaching career: 2000–2001

Career history

Playing
- 1986: Los Angeles Clippers
- 1989–1991: Limoneros de Colima

Coaching
- 2000–2001: Los Angeles Southwest (assistant)

Career highlights
- 2× WCAC Player of the Year (1985, 1986); 2× First-team All-WCAC (1985, 1986); Third-team Parade All-American (1981); McDonald's All-American (1981); California Mr. Basketball (1981)
- Stats at NBA.com
- Stats at Basketball Reference

Dwayne L. Polee Sr. (born March 2, 1963) is an American former professional basketball player and coach who has been the director of player development at the University of San Francisco since 2012. From 2007 to 2010, he was the director of basketball operations at the University of Southern California. Polee graduated from Manual Arts High School in 1981 and first attended the University of Nevada, Las Vegas before transferring to Pepperdine University in 1982. He was drafted in the third round of the 1986 NBA draft by the Los Angeles Clippers and played in one game with the team during the 1986–87 season. He played basketball for two years in Mexico with Limoneros de Colima from 1989 to 1991. Following his retirement from playing, Polee served as an assistant coach at Los Angeles Southwest College during the 2000–01 season.

Polee, a 6'5" swingman, was the 1981 Los Angeles City Section Player of the Year at Manual Arts. He turned in perhaps the greatest individual performance in City championship game history when he scored 43 points in Manual Arts' 82–69 victory over Crenshaw High School at the Los Angeles Memorial Sports Arena in front of 14,123, the largest crowd in city history.

His son, Dwayne Jr., also won the Los Angeles City Section Player of the Year in 2010 playing for Westchester High School. They were the second father–son combo to achieve the distinction. (Note: Marques (1973) and Kris Johnson (1993) were the first.) Dwayne Jr. played college ball for San Diego State.

== Career statistics ==
Legend
GP	Games played	GS	Games started	MPG	Minutes per game
FG%	Field goal percentage	3P%	3-point field goal percentage	FT%	Free throw percentage
RPG	Rebounds per game	APG	Assists per game	SPG	Steals per game
BPG	Blocks per game	PPG	Points per game	**Bold**	Career high

=== NBA ===
==== Regular season ====
Year	Team	GP	GS	MPG	FG%	3P%	FT%	RPG	APG	SPG	BPG	PPG
1986–87	L.A. Clippers	1	0	4.0	.250	.000	–	.0	.0	1.0	.0	2.0
