= Orlando Phillips =

American basketball player (born 1960)

Personal information
- Born: June 30, 1960 (age 66) San Francisco, California
- Listed height: 201 cm (6 ft 7 in)
- Listed weight: 98 kg (216 lb)

Career information
- High school: Woodrow Wilson (San Francisco, California)
- College: CC of San Francisco (1978–1980); Pepperdine (1981–1983)
- NBA draft: 1983: 3rd round, 69th overall pick
- Drafted by: Los Angeles Lakers
- Playing career: 1983–1993
- Position: Power forward

Career history
- 1983: Sarasota Stingers
- 1983–1984: Wyoming Wildcatters
- 1984–1985: Cajamadrid
- 1984–1985: Eczacıbaşı
- 1989: Adelaide 36ers
- 1990, 1991–1993: Pau Orthez
- 1993–1994: Hapoel Jerusalem

Career highlights
- WCAC co-Player of the Year (1983); 2× First-team All-WCAC (1982, 1983)
- Stats at Basketball Reference

Orlando Darryl Phillips (born June 30, 1960) is an American former basketball player. Phillips was a strong rebounding power forward who also played in Australia and Europe during his career.

== College career ==
Born in San Francisco, California, the 6-foot-7-inch (201 cm) tall Philips was a standout power forward for the Pepperdine University Waves, sharing the 1983 West Coast Conference Men's Basketball Player of the Year award with Waves teammate Dane Suttle.

== Professional career ==
Unfortunately little is known about the professional basketball career of Orlando Phillips. He was selected as the 69th pick in Round 3 of the 1983 NBA draft by the Los Angeles Lakers, but he never made their roster.

In 1989 he played for the Adelaide 36ers in Australia's National Basketball League. Phillips had a slow start to the 1989 NBL season while still recovering from a broken foot, but his numbers increased through the season. He wore the number "00" for the 36ers and early in the NBL season before his form changed, the joke in Adelaide was that 00 stood for "Oh Oh". 36ers players were told by their then coach Gary Fox that Phillips was a non-smoker, non-drinker, and that he wasn't a "womaniser". According to 36ers player Scott Ninnis, this proved to be false after his teammates saw him drunk at a bar, a woman under each arm and a cigar hanging out of his mouth, all within a week of his arrival in Adelaide. Al Green recalled during the 36ers "The Golden Era" DVD that this helped Phillips fit in very well with the team off the court.

Orlando Phillips played 25 NBL games for the 36ers in 1989. Despite a slow start to the season, he improved in the second half of the year and went on to average 20.5 points @ 62.6%, 11 rebounds, 1 assist, 1 block and 1.2 steals in 31 minutes per game.

Phillips also had a stint in the Euroleague with Pau Orthez in the 1992–93 season. He played 14 games for Orthez and averaged 12 points, 8.6 rebounds and 1.6 assists per game.
