= Grant Gondrezick =

American basketball player (1963–2021)

Personal information
- Born: January 19, 1963 Boulder, Colorado, U.S.
- Died: January 7, 2021 (aged 57) Stevensville, Michigan, U.S.
- Listed height: 6 ft 5 in (1.96 m)
- Listed weight: 205 lb (93 kg)

Career information
- High school: Boulder (Boulder, Colorado)
- College: Pepperdine (1981–1986)
- NBA draft: 1986: 4th round, 77th overall pick
- Drafted by: Phoenix Suns
- Playing career: 1986–1998
- Position: Shooting guard
- Number: 3

Career history
- 1986–1987: Phoenix Suns
- 1987–1988: Caen
- 1988–1989: Los Angeles Clippers
- 1989–1990: Rapid City Thrillers
- 1990–1991: Albany Patroons
- 1991: La Crosse Catbirds
- 1992–1993: Miami Tropics
- 1993–1994: Carife Ferrara
- 1994–1995: Okapi Aalstar
- 1995–1996: Estudiantes de Bahía Blanca
- 1996: Fórum Filatélico
- 1996–1997: CSP Limoges
- 1997–1998: Estudiantes de Bahía Blanca
- Stats at NBA.com
- Stats at Basketball Reference

Grant Gondrezick Sr. (January 19, 1963 – January 7, 2021) was an American shooting guard who played professional basketball in the NBA and a number of other leagues.

== Basketball career ==
After attending high school in his hometown, 6'5" Gondrezick played college basketball at Pepperdine University in the mid-1980s. He led the team in scoring during the 1983–84 season with a 13.7 points per game average, and was redshirted in the following year.

In 1986, Gondrezick was drafted by the Phoenix Suns with the 77th pick of the NBA draft. During his rookie season with the Suns in April 1987, Gondrezick was indicted on drug charges along nine others including two teammates and two former Suns players. The league announced the players would face lifetime bans if they were found guilty of the charges. Gondrezick proclaimed his innocence and claimed he was shocked by the indictments. In September 1987, he pled guilty to a charge of witness tampering and received a $100 fine and three years probation. The drug charges were dismissed.

After spending a season in France, Gondrezick returned to the NBA for the 1988–89 season with the Los Angeles Clippers. After appearing in 27 games for the Clippers, he checked into a substance abuse clinic in January 1989 and never played in the NBA again.

He spent a total of two seasons in the National Basketball Association, one apiece with the Suns and the Clippers, averaging five points, two rebounds and one assist per game.

== Personal life ==
Gondrezick was married to Lisa Harvey and had three children, WNBA player Kysre, Kalabrya, and Grant II.

Gondrezick's older brother, Glen, was also a professional basketball player, and a shooting guard. He played six years in the NBA, dying in 2009 at the age of 53 due to heart failure.

On January 8, 2021, it was announced that Gondrezick had died from a heart attack the night before at the age of 57.

== Career statistics ==
Legend
GP	Games played	GS	Games started	MPG	Minutes per game
FG%	Field goal percentage	3P%	3-point field goal percentage	FT%	Free throw percentage
RPG	Rebounds per game	APG	Assists per game	SPG	Steals per game
BPG	Blocks per game	PPG	Points per game	**Bold**	Career high

=== NBA ===
==== Regular season ====
Year	Team	GP	GS	MPG	FG%	3P%	FT%	RPG	APG	SPG	BPG	PPG
1986–87	Phoenix	**64**	**1**	**13.1**	**.450**	.235	**.701**	**1.7**	**1.3**	.4	**.1**	**5.5**
1988–89	L.A. Clippers	27	0	9.0	.400	.273	.650	1.3	**1.3**	**.5**	.0	3.9
Career		91	1	11.9	.438	.250	.687	1.6	1.3	.4	.1	5.0
