= Pepperdine Waves men's basketball =

American college basketball team

2026–27 Pepperdine Waves men's basketball team
- University: Pepperdine University
- First season: 1938-39
- Head coach: Griff Aldrich (1st season)
- Location: Malibu, California
- Arena: The Mountain at Mullin Park (capacity: 3,600)
- Conference: West Coast Conference
- Nickname: Waves
- Colors: Blue, white, and orange
- Student section: Riptide

NCAA Division I tournament Elite Eight
- 1944
Other NCAA Division I tournament results
Sweet Sixteen	1962, 1976
Appearances	1944, 1962, 1976, 1979, 1982, 1983, 1985, 1986, 1991, 1992, 1994, 2000, 2002

Conference tournament champions
- 1991, 1992, 1994

Conference regular-season champions
- 1962, 1976, 1981, 1982, 1983, 1985, 1986, 1991, 1992, 1993, 2000, 2002

Uniforms
Home	Away
Alternate	Alternate

The Pepperdine Waves men's basketball team is an American college basketball team that represents Pepperdine University in NCAA Division I, the highest level of intercollegiate athletics sanctioned by the National Collegiate Athletic Association (NCAA). The Waves compete in the West Coast Conference and are coached by Griff Aldrich.

The Waves have competed in the NCAA Division I men's basketball tournament 13 times and are 3rd all-time in WCC Tournament wins and championships. The Waves most recently appeared in the NCAA tournament in 2002. Thirty-eight former Waves have been drafted or played in the NBA including Doug Christie and Dennis Johnson, an inductee of the Naismith Memorial Basketball Hall of Fame. The most recent Waves drafted into the NBA are Kessler Edwards (2021) and Maxwell Lewis (2023).

Their home arena is the Firestone Fieldhouse. This is a multi-purpose facility that hosts volleyball, basketball, as well as other athletic events. They share this facility with the Pepperdine Waves women's basketball team.

== History ==
=== Early years and independence ===
The Pepperdine Men’s Basketball team played their first season in 1938-39. The Waves would reach their first postseason tournament under coach Alva Duer four years later and would go on to compete in the 6th ever NCAA Tournament in 1944. Within the first eight years of the program’s history, the Waves would also earn invitations to four NAIA tournaments for a total of five postseason tournaments, including reaching the 1945 NAIA championship game. Al Duer would later be inducted into the Naismith Basketball Hall of Fame in 1982 for his contributions to the sport.

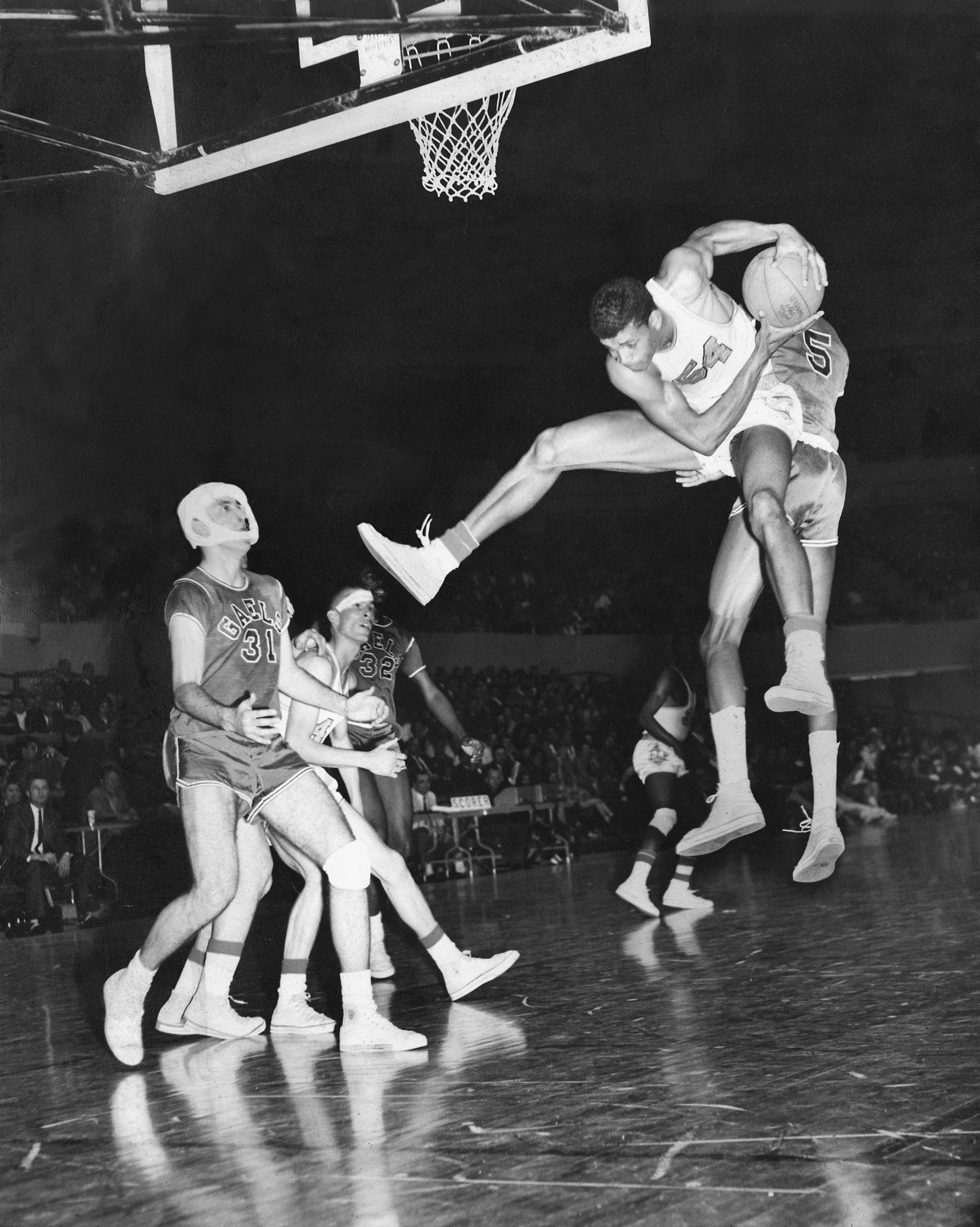
Pepperdine basketball game in 1959

Their next coach was Robert “Duck” Dowell who led the Waves for 20 seasons, winning four consecutive California Collegiate Athletic Association titles and competing in three NAIA tournaments between the 1949-50 to 1951-52 seasons. Dowell led the Waves to their second NCAA Tournament after winning the WCC regular-season championship in 1961-62.

The early years of Pepperdine’s basketball program would be a time of great change. During this period the Waves played basketball as independents and hosted their home games in a variety of locations including historic sports venues such as The Great Western Forum and the Los Angeles Sports Arena. But as the program continued to grow, it became clear that the Waves needed both a home conference and a dedicated arena. Pepperdine would join the West Coast Conference for the 1955-56 season with their long time rival Loyola Marymount and on November, 30th, 1973 they constructed Firestone Fieldhouse on campus near Malibu, California.

=== 1970s - 1990s Rolling the West Coast Conference ===
Two years later the 1975-76 Pepperdine squad would win their second WCC regular-season championship under head coach Gary Colson and advance to their third NCAA Tournament, defeating the University of Memphis in the first round. The Waves would return to the NCAA Tournament in 1979 collecting another first round victory, this time over the University of Utah.

In 1979 Jim Harrick was selected as the next head coach. Over the next nine years he would lead the Waves to six postseason tournaments including NIT appearances in 1980 and 1988 and four NCAA Tournament appearances in 1982 (defeating Pittsburgh in the first round), 1983, 1985, and 1986. Their trip to the 1983 tournament was particularly memorable as Pepperdine would take eventual national champion North Carolina State to double overtime. Although the Waves eventually fell 69-67, it was the closest game NC State played the entire tournament as they defeated their next five opponents all in regulation by an average of six points.

Tom Asbury was then promoted from assistant to head coach in 1988. In just six seasons at the helm, Asbury led the waves to a cumulative record of 125–59 (.679), five postseason tournaments, and the most consecutive conference wins in WCC history known as “The Streak.” The Waves competed in the NIT in 1989 and 1993 as well as three more trips to the NCAA Tournament in 1991, 1992, and 1994.

=== 2000 Cinderellas ===
Jan van Breda Kolff would then take over the program and lead Pepperdine to their twelfth NCAA Tournament appearance in 2000. The eleventh-seeded Waves would become the Cinderella team of the tournament and upset the Indiana Hoosiers in the first round in what would become Bob Knight’s final game as the program’s coach. Pepperdine then fell to eventual Elite 8 team Oklahoma State.

Over the next two years the Waves would build on this success posting a record of 44–18 and return to both the NIT in 2001 and the program’s thirteenth NCAA Tournament in 2002. In the 2001-02 season Pepperdine tied nationally ranked Gonzaga for the WCC regular-season title and earned an at-large bid to the NCAA Tournament with wins over USC as well as 10th-ranked UCLA and 13th-ranked Gonzaga.

=== Breaking Records and Post-season Victories ===
In the years that followed the Waves have seen numerous program records broken including in 2016 when Stacy Davis became the all-time leading scorer and in 2017 when Jeremy Major became the all-time leader in assists. Both of these records would then be broken again by Colbey Ross who finished his Pepperdine career in 2021 as the program’s all-time leader in scoring, assists, and with several other records. Colbey Ross is also the first player in NCAA Division I men’s basketball history to accumulate totals of at least 2,200 points, 800 assists and 400 rebounds.

After a brief stint in the late 90s, Lorenzo Romar returned 19 years later as Pepperdine’s head coach for the 2018-19 season. In his first season back with the Waves, Romar completed a historic turnaround for the program, increasing the team’s win total from the previous season by ten. Two years later his 2020-21 squad would win the program’s first ever postseason tournament, the 2021 College Basketball Invitational, by defeating Coastal Carolina 84–61.

Pepperdine is 3rd all-time in WCC tournament wins and championships as well as WCC league wins since 1979 when the conference expanded to its current size. Throughout their long history the Waves have competed in 29 postseason tournaments including 6 NITs and 13 NCAA Tournaments.

== "The Streak" ==
From January 12, 1991, to January 29, 1993, the Pepperdine Waves went on a record-setting run known as “The Streak.” During this span the Waves won 38 West Coast Conference games in a row including the WCC tournament. This was the first time in 36 years that a team had won more than 31 league games in a row. The last team to do this were the 1954-57 San Francisco Dons led by Bill Russell who set the then-record at 31 consecutive games.

Led by Coach Tom Asbury and star shooting guard Doug Christie, The Streak began with a win over Santa Clara before earning 12 more wins to finish the 1990-91 season 13-1 in WCC play and 22-9 overall. This span includes season sweeps against programs LMU (just one year removed from their NCAA Tournament run to the Elite 8), Gonzaga, and Saint Mary’s. The season culminated with the Waves beating Saint Mary’s for a third time in five weeks to win the WCC tournament and earn a trip to the NCAA Tournament.

The following 1991-92 season the Waves continued to improve and went undefeated in the regular season sweeping their rival programs LMU, Gonzaga, as well as Saint Mary’s for a second consecutive year. At 14-0 this season also tied Pepperdine’s record for most conference wins in a single season. The margin of victory in those games also grew with the Waves defeating their WCC opponents by an average of roughly 12 points per game. Pepperdine would go on to win a second straight WCC tournament and compete in the NCAA Tournament for the second time in two years. At the conclusion of the season the winning streak had grown to 27 regular season games and 33 overall. The 1991-92 Waves were only the second WCC squad ever to go a perfect 14-0 in league and win the tournament title in the same season. Coach Tom Asbury and shooting guard Doug Christie would each earn WCC Coach of the Year and WCC Player of the Year awards respectively for the second consecutive year.

Finally during the 1992-93 season the Waves would extend their winning streak to 38 consecutive WCC games, breaking the 36 year old record, as well as win a third consecutive regular-season title. The Streak came to an end in January 1993 when, ironically, the previous record holders San Francisco defeated the Waves 75-72. In three seasons from 1990-91 to the end of 1992-93 Pepperdine won three WCC regular-season titles, two WCC tournament championships, and held a combined record of 38–4.

While the Gonzaga Bulldogs came close to breaking the record, winning 35 games from February 2020 to February 2022, their series came to an end when conference rival Saint Mary’s defeated them 67-57. Over 30 years later no West Coast Conference team has ever won more than 38 consecutive league games and The Streak stands as a key part of WCC history that remains unmatched to this day.

== Rivalries ==
The Pepperdine–LMU basketball rivalry, referred to as The PCH Cup since 2009, is an American college basketball rivalry between the Pepperdine Waves and LMU Lions. The first game of the 177-game series was played in the 1940-41 season, fifteen years before both teams joined the West Coast Conference. This makes the rivalry the oldest and most played in WCC history. The Waves hold a 104-73 wins advantage in the series as well as records for the longest win streak (13 straight wins from 1998 to 2004) and the largest margin of victory (34 points on March 4, 2000).

A lesser-known rivalry of the Waves is the Pepperdine-Gonzaga Rivalry, referred to as The Surf and Turf Showdown. It is an American college basketball rivalry between the Pepperdine Waves and Gonzaga Bulldogs. Played since 1979 this competition is one of the newer rivalries in West Coast Conference. The Waves currently hold the record for most overtime wins in the series and up until recently boasted the longest winning streak in the series winning 12 games in a row from 1987 to 1992. Gonzaga currently has a 51 game winning streak against Pepperdine, dating back to 2002.

== Postseason results ==
=== NCAA tournament results ===
The Waves have qualified for the NCAA Division I men's basketball tournament 13 times. Their combined record is 5–14.

Year	Seed	Round	Opponent	Result
1944	-	Elite Eight; Regional 3rd Place Game	Iowa State; Missouri	L 39–44; L 46–61
1962	-	Sweet Sixteen; Regional 3rd Place Game	Oregon State; Utah State	L 67–69; W 75–71
1976	-	Round of 32; Sweet Sixteen	Memphis; UCLA	W 87–77; L 61–70
1979	#9	Round of 40; Round of 32	#8 Utah #1 UCLA	W 92–88^{OT} L 71–76
1982	#7	Round of 48; Round of 32	#10 Pittsburgh #2 Oregon State	W 99–88; L 51–70
1983	#11	Round of 52	#6 North Carolina State	L 67–69^{2OT}
1985	#14	Round of 64	#3 Duke	L 62–75
1986	#12	Round of 64	#5 Maryland	L 64–69
1991	#14	Round of 64	#3 Seton Hall	L 51–71
1992	#11	Round of 64	#6 Memphis	L 70–80
1994	#14	Round of 64	#3 Michigan	L 74–78^{OT}
2000	#11	Round of 64; Round of 32	#6 Indiana #3 Oklahoma State	W 77–57; L 67–75
2002	#10	Round of 64	#7 Wake Forest	L 74–83

=== NIT results ===
The Waves have qualified for the National Invitation Tournament (NIT) six times. Their combined record is 3–6.

Year	Round	Opponent	Result
1980	First Round	Long Beach State	L 87–104
1988	First Round	New Mexico	L 75–86
1989	First Round; Second Round	New Mexico State; New Mexico	W 84–69; L 69–86
1993	First Round; Second Round	UC Santa Barbara; USC	W 53–50; L 59–71
1999	First Round	Colorado	L 61–65
2001	First Round; Second Round	Wyoming; New Mexico	W 72–69; L 78–81

=== CBI results ===
The Waves have qualified for the College Basketball Invitational (CBI) three times. In their third appearance, the Waves won the 2021 CBI Championship. Their combined record is 3–2.

Year	Round	Opponent	Result
2015	First Round	Seattle	L 45–62
2016	First Round	Eastern Washington	L 72–79
2021	First Round; Semifinals; Finals	Longwood; Bellarmine; Coastal Carolina	W 80–66; W 82–71; W 84–61

=== NAIA tournament results ===
The Waves have qualified for the NAIA men's basketball tournament seven times. Their combined record is 11–7.

Year	Round	Opponent	Result
1942	First Round	Missouri Valley	L 53–68
1943	First Round; Quarterfinals	Kearney State; Luther; Murray State	W 50–45; W 43–38; L 38–44
1945	First Round; Quarterfinals; Semifinals; National Championship Game	Peru State; West Texas State; Eastern Kentucky; Loyola (LA)	W 77–42; W 52–45; W 52–34; L 35–49
1946	First Round; Second Round; Quarterfinals; Semifinals; National 3rd Place Game	Arkansas Teachers; State College of Iowa; Eastern Washington; Indiana State; Loyola (LA)	W 63–37; W 64–22; W 46–42; L 43–56; W 82–55
1950	First Round; Second Round	American; Tampa	W 54–50; L 61–69
1951	First Round; Second Round	Eau Claire State; Florida State	W 86–53; L 59–61
1952	First Round	Morningside	L 80–84

== Waves in the NBA ==
Thirty-three former Waves have been drafted by the NBA, and 19 former Waves have played in the NBA, including Dennis Johnson, an inductee of the Naismith Memorial Basketball Hall of Fame.

For 34 consecutive seasons, from the 1976–77 NBA season to the 2010–2011 NBA season, at least one former Wave played in an NBA game.

Player	Pepperdine Career	NBA Career	NBA Draft			
Player	Pepperdine Career	NBA Career	Year	Round	Pick	Team
Maxwell Lewis	2021–2023	Los Angeles Lakers, 2023–2024; Brooklyn Nets, 2024–present	2023	2	40	Denver Nuggets
Kessler Edwards	2018–2021	Brooklyn Nets, 2021–2023; Sacramento Kings, 2023–2024; Dallas Mavericks, 2024–present	2021	2	44	Brooklyn Nets
Mychel Thompson	2007–2011	Cleveland Cavaliers, 2011–2012	Undrafted	–	–	–
Yakhouba Diawara	2003–2005	Denver Nuggets, 2006–2008; Miami Heat, 2008–2010	Undrafted	–	–	–
Alex Acker	2002–2005	Detroit Pistons, 2005–2006; 2008–2009; Los Angeles Clippers, 2008–2009	2005	2	60	Detroit Pistons
Doug Christie	1989–1992	Los Angeles Lakers, 1992–1994; New York Knicks, 1994–1996; Toronto Raptors, 1996–2000; Sacramento Kings, 2000–2005; Orlando Magic, 2005; Dallas Mavericks, 2005–2006; Los Angeles Clippers, 2006–2007	1992	1	17	Seattle SuperSonics
Brandon Armstrong	1999–2001	New Jersey Nets, 2001–2004	2001	1	23	Houston Rockets
Gerald Brown	1993–1997	Phoenix Suns, 1998–1999	Undrafted	–	–	–
Anthony Frederick	1984–1986	Indiana Pacers, 1988–1989; Sacramento Kings, 1991; Charlotte Hornets, 1991–1992	1986	6	133	Denver Nuggets
Dennis Johnson	1975–1976	Seattle SuperSonics, 1976–1980; Phoenix Suns, 1980–1983; Boston Celtics, 1983–1990	1976	2	29	Seattle SuperSonics
Eric White	1983–1987	Los Angeles Clippers, 1988; Utah Jazz, 1989; Los Angeles Clippers, 1989	1987	3	65	Detroit Pistons
Grant Gondrezick	1981–1985	Phoenix Suns, 1986–1987; Los Angeles Clippers, 1988–1989	1986	4	77	Phoenix Suns
Dwayne Polee	1983–1986	Los Angeles Clippers, 1986	1986	3	54	Los Angeles Clippers
Dane Suttle	1979–1983	Kansas City Kings, 1983–1984	1983	7	152	Kansas City Kings
Tony Fuller	1978–1980	Detroit Pistons, 1980	1980	5	93	Detroit Pistons
Bird Averitt	1971–1973	Buffalo Braves, 1976–1977; New Jersey Nets, 1977; Buffalo Braves, 1978	1973	4	55	Portland Trail Blazers
Bob Warlick	1961–1963	Detroit Pistons, 1965–1966; San Francisco Warriors, 1966–1968; Milwaukee Bucks, 1968; Phoenix Suns, 1968–1969	Undrafted	–	–	–
Bob Sims	1957–1960	Los Angeles Lakers, 1961; St. Louis Hawks, 1961–1962	1960	7	54	St. Louis Hawks
Bob O'Brien	1944–1945	Philadelphia Warriors, 1947–1948; St. Louis Bombers, 1948–1949	Undrafted	–	–	–
Scott McCollum	1979–1984	–	1984	5	110	Golden State Warriors
Victor Anger	1980–1984	–	1984	7	157	Portland Trail Blazers
Orlando Phillips	1981–1983	–	1983	3	69	Los Angeles Lakers
Bill Sadler	1980–1983	–	1983	8	171	Dallas Mavericks
Boot Bond	1978–1982	–	1982	3	62	Denver Nuggets
Ricardo Brown	1978–1980	–	1979	3	59	Houston Rockets
Ray Ellis	1975–1979	–	1979	6	120	Portland Trail Blazers
Ollie Matson	1974–1979	–	1979	7	147	Phoenix Suns
Art Allen	1974–1977	–	1977	8	170	Los Angeles Lakers
Marcos Leite	1973–1976	–	1976	10	162	Portland Trail Blazers
Allan Jones	1972–1974	–	1975	8	142	Buffalo Braves
Steve Sims	1968–1971	–	1971	17	231	Houston Rockets
Bobby Sands	1968–1970	–	1970	9	149	Los Angeles Lakers
Hal Grant	1966–1968	–	1968	18	204	San Diego Rockets
Harry Dinnel	1960–1963	–	1963	8	65	San Francisco Warriors
Sterling Forbes	1957–1960	–	1960	11	76	Los Angeles Lakers
John Furlong	1948–1951	–	1951	3	26	Boston Celtics
Hugh Faulkner	1948–1951	–	1951	9	81	Philadelphia Warriors
Joy Pace	1943–1948	–	1948	–	–	Philadelphia Warriors

== Waves in international leagues ==
- Daniel Johnson (Pepperdine 2007–08), retired 6'11" Australian center, played for the Melbourne Tigers, Adelaide 36ers and South East Melbourne Phoenix in Australia's National Basketball League from 2008–2023. An Australian Boomers representative, Johnson had his No.21 jersey retired by the Adelaide 36ers on January 13, 2025.
- Jackson Stormo (born 1999), basketball player for Hapoel Haifa in the Israeli Basketball Premier League
