= Phoenix Suns all-time roster =

The following is a list of players, both past and current, who have appeared in at least one regular season or playoff game for the Phoenix Suns NBA franchise.

All statistics and awards listed were during the player's tenure with the Suns only. All statistics are accurate as of the end of the 2025–26 season.

== Players ==
G	Guard	G/F	Guard-forward	F	Forward	F/C	Forward-center	C	Center

legend
^	Denotes player who has been inducted to the Naismith Memorial Basketball Hall of Fame
*	Denotes player who has been selected for at least one All-Star Game with the Phoenix Suns and is currently on the team roster
^{+}	Denotes player who has been selected for at least one All-Star Game with the Phoenix Suns
^{x}	Denotes player who is currently on the Phoenix Suns roster
0.0	Denotes the Phoenix Suns statistics leader (min. 100 games played for the team for per-game statistics)

=== A to B ===
All-time roster
Player	Pos.	Pre-draft team	Yrs	Seasons	Statistics									Ref.
Player	Pos.	Pre-draft team	Yrs	Seasons	GP	MP	REB	AST	PTS	MPG	RPG	APG	PPG	Ref.
Quincy Acy	F	Baylor	1	2018–2019	10	123	25	8	17	12.3	2.5	0.8	1.7	
Alvan Adams^{+} (#33)	C	Oklahoma	13	1975–1988	988	27,203	6,937	4,012	13,910	27.5	7.0	4.1	14.1	
Rafael Addison	F	Syracuse	1	1986–1987	62	711	106	45	359	11.5	1.7	0.7	5.8	
Danny Ainge	G	BYU	3	1992–1995	222	5,092	454	650	2,124	22.9	2.0	2.9	9.6	
Ty-Shon Alexander	G	Creighton	1	2020–2021	15	47	10	6	9	3.1	0.7	0.4	0.6	
Grayson Allen^{x}	G	Duke	3	2023–2026	190	5,524	644	559	2,535	29.1	3.4	2.9	13.3	
Lou Amundson	F	UNLV	2	2008–2010	155	2,212	616	59	692	14.3	4.0	0.4	4.5	
Ryan Anderson	F	California	1	2018–2019	15	278	45	17	56	18.5	3.0	1.1	3.7	
Robert Archibald	F	Illinois	1	2003–2004	1	6	1	1	1	6.0	1.0	1.0	1.0	
Trevor Ariza	F	UCLA	1	2018–2019	26	884	145	87	258	34.0	5.6	3.3	9.9	
Dennis Awtrey	C	Santa Clara	4	1974–1978	309	7,596	1,655	846	1,873	24.6	5.4	2.7	6.1	
Deandre Ayton	C	Arizona	5	2018–2023	303	9,282	3,152	495	5,046	30.6	10.4	1.6	16.7	
Udoka Azubuike	C	Kansas	1	2023–2024	16	113	32	3	35	7.1	2.0	0.2	2.2	
James Bailey	F	Rutgers	1	1987–1988	65	869	210	42	288	13.4	3.2	0.6	4.4	
Toby Bailey	G	UCLA	2	1998–2000	73	698	126	43	241	9.6	1.7	0.6	3.3	
Marcus Banks	G	UNLV	2	2006–2008	69	813	58	85	346	11.8	0.8	1.2	5.0	
Mike Bantom	F	Saint Joseph's	3	1973–1976	165	4,289	1,095	325	1,811	26.0	6.6	2.0	11.0	
Leandro Barbosa	G	(Brazil) Bauru Basket	9	2003–2010; 2013–2014; 2016–2017	553	13,035	1,239	1,321	6,443	23.6	2.2	2.4	11.7	
Charles Barkley^ (#34)	F	Auburn	4	1992–1996	280	10,171	3,232	1,219	6,556	36.3	11.5	4.4	23.4	
Matt Barnes	F	UCLA	1	2008–2009	77	2,082	421	212	788	27.0	5.5	2.8	10.2	
Andre Barrett	G	Seton Hall	1	2005–2006	2	21	3	2	9	10.5	1.5	1.0	4.5	
Earl Barron	C	Memphis	2	2010–2011; 2014–2015	28	326	68	9	68	11.6	2.4	0.3	2.4	
Paris Bass	F	Detroit Mercy	1	2021–2022	2	7	4	0	6	3.5	2.0	0.0	3.0	
Keita Bates-Diop	F	Ohio State	1	2023–2024	39	597	101	34	174	15.3	2.6	0.9	4.5	
Kenny Battle	F	Illinois	2	1989–1991	75	992	177	53	338	13.2	2.4	0.7	4.5	
Aron Baynes	C	Washington State	1	2019–2020	42	934	237	67	481	22.2	5.6	1.6	11.5	
Darius Bazley	F/C	Princeton HS (OH)	1	2022–2023	7	61	16	6	28	8.7	2.3	0.9	4.0	
Bradley Beal	G	Florida	2	2023–2025	106	3,469	409	460	1,866	32.7	3.9	4.3	17.6	
Michael Beasley	F	Kansas State	1	2012–2013	75	1,554	282	111	759	20.7	3.8	1.5	10.1	
William Bedford	C	Memphis	1	1986–1987	50	979	246	57	334	19.6	4.9	1.1	6.7	
Charlie Bell	G	Michigan State	1	2001–2002	5	42	4	2	8	8.4	0.8	0.4	1.6	
Raja Bell	G	FIU	4	2005–2009	254	9,234	842	600	3,406	36.4	3.3	2.4	13.4	
Dragan Bender	F	(Israel) Maccabi Tel Aviv	3	2016–2019	171	3,469	647	209	907	20.3	3.8	1.2	5.3	
Mario Bennett	F	Arizona State	1	1995–1996	19	230	49	6	85	12.1	2.6	0.3	4.5	
Eddie Biedenbach	G	NC State	1	1968–1969	7	18	2	3	4	2.6	0.3	0.4	0.6	
Bismack Biyombo	C	(Spain) Baloncesto Fuenlabrada	2	2021–2023	97	1,380	427	79	473	14.2	4.4	0.8	4.9	
Eric Bledsoe	G	Kentucky	5	2013–2018	224	7,534	1,077	1,345	4,209	33.6	4.8	6.0	18.8	
Corie Blount	F	Cincinnati	2	1999–2001	68	833	198	18	161	12.3	2.9	0.3	2.4	
Bol Bol	F	Oregon	2	2023–2025	79	917	241	39	467	11.6	3.1	0.5	5.9	
Jonah Bolden	F	UCLA	1	2019–2020	3	33	8	0	6	11.0	2.7	0.0	2.0	
Dexter Boney	G	UNLV	1	1996–1997	8	48	6	0	19	6.0	0.8	0.0	2.4	
Devin Booker*	G	Kentucky	11	2015–2026	737	25,295	2,966	3,908	18,120	34.3	4.0	5.3	24.6	
Jamaree Bouyea^{x}	G	San Francisco	1	2025–2026	46	644	82	82	263	14.0	1.8	1.8	5.7	
Dudley Bradley	G/F	North Carolina	1	1981–1982	64	937	87	80	325	14.6	1.4	1.3	5.1	
Mike Bratz	G	Stanford	3	1977–1980	239	3,819	423	525	1,697	16.0	1.8	2.2	7.1	
Koby Brea^{x}	G	Kentucky	1	2025–2026	12	84	8	10	45	7.0	0.7	0.8	3.8	
Jalen Bridges	F	Baylor	1	2024–2025	8	30	4	0	9	3.8	0.5	0.0	1.1	
Mikal Bridges	G	Villanova	5	2018–2023	365	11,701	1,455	840	4,448	32.1	4.0	2.3	12.2	
Aaron Brooks	G	Oregon	1	2010–2011	25	473	27	104	240	18.9	1.1	4.2	9.6	
Dillon Brooks^{x}	F	Oregon	1	2025–2026	56	1,702	203	99	1,131	30.4	3.6	1.8	20.2	
Chucky Brown	F	NC State	1	1996–1997	10	83	16	4	34	8.3	1.6	0.4	3.4	
Dee Brown	G	Illinois	1	2008–2009	2	28	1	3	5	14.0	0.5	1.5	2.5	
Gerald Brown	G	Pepperdine	1	1998–1999	33	236	22	31	80	7.2	0.7	0.9	2.4	
Lorenzo Brown	G	NC State	1	2015–2016	8	61	7	11	20	7.6	0.9	1.4	2.5	
Mike Brown	C	George Washington	1	1996–1997	6	83	25	5	16	13.8	4.2	0.8	2.7	
Randy Brown	G	New Mexico State	1	2002–2003	32	262	26	35	41	8.2	0.8	1.1	1.3	
Shannon Brown	G	Michigan State	2	2011–2013	118	2,802	306	177	1,267	23.7	2.6	1.5	10.7	
Mark Bryant	F/C	Seton Hall	2	1996–1998	111	2,128	456	93	671	19.2	4.1	0.8	6.0	
Chase Budinger	F	Arizona	1	2015–2016	17	200	29	15	55	11.8	1.7	0.9	3.2	
Jud Buechler	G/F	Arizona	1	2001–2002	6	54	8	3	6	9.0	1.3	0.5	1.0	
Reggie Bullock	G/F	North Carolina	1	2014–2015	11	75	10	2	4	6.8	0.9	0.2	0.4	
Pat Burke	C	Auburn	2	2005–2007	65	510	120	21	201	7.8	1.8	0.3	3.1	
Steve Burtt Sr.	G	Iona	1	1991–1992	31	356	34	59	187	11.5	1.1	1.9	6.0	
Don Buse	G	Evansville	3	1977–1980	245	7,590	699	1,067	1,952	31.0	2.9	4.4	8.0	
Marty Byrnes	F	Syracuse	1	1978–1979	43	734	97	61	291	17.1	2.3	1.4	6.8	

=== C ===
All-time roster
Player	Pos.	Pre-draft team	Yrs	Seasons	Statistics									Ref.
Player	Pos.	Pre-draft team	Yrs	Seasons	GP	MP	REB	AST	PTS	MPG	RPG	APG	PPG	Ref.
Žarko Čabarkapa	F	(Montenegro) Budućnost	2	2003–2005	52	581	102	40	212	11.2	2.0	0.8	4.1	
Corky Calhoun	F	Penn	3	1972–1975	172	4,340	778	215	1,165	25.2	4.5	1.3	6.8	
Isaiah Canaan	G	Murray State	2	2017–2019	38	921	93	138	314	24.2	2.4	3.6	8.3	
Chris Carr	G	Southern Illinois	1	1995–1996	60	590	102	43	240	9.8	1.7	0.7	4.0	
Joe Barry Carroll	C	Purdue	1	1990–1991	11	96	24	11	37	8.7	2.2	1.0	3.4	
Jevon Carter	G	West Virginia	2	2019–2021	118	1,662	210	155	535	14.1	1.8	1.3	4.5	
Vince Carter^	G/F	North Carolina	1	2010–2011	51	1,387	185	82	689	27.2	3.6	1.6	13.5	
Sam Cassell	G	Florida State	1	1996–1997	22	539	50	99	325	24.5	2.3	4.5	14.8	
Cedric Ceballos	F	Cal State Fullerton	6	1990–1994; 1996–1998	331	6,437	1,480	337	3,916	19.4	4.5	1.0	11.8	
Bill Chamberlain	F	North Carolina	1	1973–1974	28	367	80	37	153	13.1	2.9	1.3	5.5	
Jerry Chambers	F	Utah	1	1969–1970	79	1,139	219	54	657	14.4	2.8	0.7	8.3	
Tom Chambers^{+} (#24)	F	Utah	5	1988–1993	380	12,194	2,491	858	7,817	32.1	6.6	2.3	20.6	
Tyson Chandler	C	Dominguez HS (CA)	4	2015–2019	166	4,156	1,572	153	1,195	25.0	9.5	0.9	7.2	
Rex Chapman	G	Kentucky	4	1996–2000	224	6,236	538	556	2,787	27.8	2.4	2.5	12.4	
Josh Childress	G/F	Stanford	2	2010–2012	88	1,385	250	76	372	15.7	2.8	0.9	4.2	
Marquese Chriss	F	Washington	2	2016–2018	154	3,270	743	143	1,309	21.2	4.8	0.9	8.5	
Bob Christian	C	Grambling State	1	1973–1974	81	1,244	339	98	386	15.4	4.2	1.2	4.8	
Dionte Christmas	G	Temple	1	2013–2014	31	198	38	8	71	6.4	1.2	0.3	2.3	
Earl Clark	F	Louisville	2	2009–2011	60	455	79	25	169	7.6	1.3	0.4	2.8	
Amir Coffey^{x}	G/F	Minnesota	1	2025–2026	16	225	31	16	77	14.1	1.9	1.0	4.8	
John Coker	C	Boise State	1	1995–1996	5	11	2	1	8	2.2	0.4	0.2	1.6	
Jarron Collins	C	Stanford	1	2009–2010	34	261	62	6	34	7.7	1.8	0.2	1.0	
Jeff Cook	F	Idaho State	5	1979–1983; 1987–1988	299	5,304	1,244	457	1,639	17.7	4.2	1.5	5.5	
Duane Cooper	G	USC	1	1993–1994	23	136	9	28	48	5.9	0.4	1.2	2.1	
Tyrone Corbin	G/F	DePaul	2	1987–1989	107	2,246	528	177	863	21.0	4.9	1.7	8.1	
Bryce Cotton	G	Providence	1	2015–2016	3	33	0	3	4	11.0	0.0	1.0	1.3	
Mel Counts	C	Oregon State	2	1970–1972	156	2,575	760	232	1,274	16.5	4.9	1.5	8.2	
Joe Courtney	F	Southern Miss	1	1993–1994	33	168	27	9	103	5.1	0.8	0.3	3.1	
Torrey Craig	F	USC Upstate	3	2020–2023	138	3,112	695	183	1,004	22.6	5.0	1.3	7.3	
Jamal Crawford	G	Michigan	1	2018–2019	64	1,211	85	229	508	18.9	1.3	3.6	7.9	
Joe Crispin	G	Penn State	1	2001–2002	15	129	10	24	69	8.6	0.7	1.6	4.6	
Winston Crite	F	Texas A&M	2	1987–1989	31	264	65	15	87	8.5	2.1	0.5	2.8	
Jae Crowder	F	Marquette	2	2020–2022	127	3,534	636	251	1,235	27.8	5.0	2.0	9.7	
Seth Curry	G	Duke	1	2014–2015	2	8	2	1	0	4.0	1.0	0.5	0.0	

=== D to E ===
All-time roster
Player	Pos.	Pre-draft team	Yrs	Seasons	Statistics									Ref.
Player	Pos.	Pre-draft team	Yrs	Seasons	GP	MP	REB	AST	PTS	MPG	RPG	APG	PPG	Ref.
Troy Daniels	G	VCU	2	2017–2019	130	2,382	200	74	1,021	18.3	1.5	0.6	7.9	
Ben Davis	F	Arizona	2	1996–1997; 1999–2000	25	120	36	2	33	4.8	1.4	0.1	1.3	
Josh Davis	F	Wyoming	1	2005–2006	1	5	1	0	4	5.0	1.0	0.0	4.0	
Mark Davis	G/F	Old Dominion	1	1988–1989	2	7	1	0	4	3.5	0.5	0.0	2.0	
Walter Davis^ (#6)	G/F	North Carolina	11	1977–1988	766	23,143	2,472	3,340	15,666	30.2	3.2	4.4	20.5	
Todd Day	G/F	Arkansas	1	1999–2000	58	941	129	65	396	16.2	2.2	1.1	6.8	
Vinny Del Negro	G	NC State	2	2000–2002	38	532	51	66	179	14.0	1.3	1.7	4.7	
Tony Delk	G	Kentucky	2	2000–2002	123	3,165	385	241	1,440	25.7	3.1	2.0	11.7	
Cheick Diallo	F/C	Kansas	1	2019–2020	47	479	131	22	219	10.2	2.8	0.5	4.7	
Boris Diaw	F	(France) Élan Béarnais	4	2005–2009	258	7,988	1,337	1,218	2,697	31.0	5.2	4.7	10.5	
Zabian Dowdell	G	Virginia Tech	1	2010–2011	24	292	20	51	121	12.2	0.8	2.1	5.0	
Goran Dragić	G	(Slovenia) Olimpija	6	2008–2011; 2012–2015	388	10,010	1,028	1,728	4,753	25.8	2.6	4.5	12.3	
Zoran Dragić	G/F	(Slovenia) Krka	1	2014–2015	6	13	3	1	6	2.2	0.5	0.2	1.0	
Chris Dudley	C	Yale	1	2000–2001	53	613	183	18	72	11.6	3.5	0.3	1.4	
Jared Dudley	G/F	Boston College	7	2008–2013; 2016–2018	468	11,097	1,610	774	4,075	23.7	3.4	1.7	8.7	
Richard Dumas	F	Oklahoma State	2	1992–1993; 1994–1995	63	1,487	252	67	839	23.6	4.0	1.1	13.3	
Tony Dumas	G	Kansas City	1	1996–1997	6	51	2	3	14	8.5	0.3	0.5	2.3	
Ryan Dunn^{x}	F	Virginia	1	2024–2026	144	2,765	564	159	918	19.2	3.9	1.1	6.4	
T. R. Dunn	G/F	Alabama	1	1988–1989	34	321	60	25	33	9.4	1.8	0.7	1.0	
Kevin Durant^{+}	F	Texas	3	2022–2025	145	5,325	920	669	3,887	36.7	6.3	4.6	26.8	
Devin Durrant	F	BYU	1	1985–1986	4	51	8	5	17	12.8	2.0	1.3	4.3	
Craig Dykema	F	Long Beach State	1	1981–1982	32	103	12	15	43	3.2	0.4	0.5	1.3	
Jarell Eddie	G/F	Virginia Tech	1	2016–2017	5	62	7	0	24	12.4	1.4	0.0	4.8	
James Edwards	C	Washington	6	1982–1988	267	6,964	1,490	530	3,933	26.1	5.6	2.0	14.7	
Howard Eisley	G	Boston College	1	2003–2004	34	727	63	117	240	21.4	1.9	3.4	7.1	
Mario Elie	G/F	American International	1	2000–2001	68	1,506	155	131	299	22.1	2.3	1.9	4.4	
Scott English	F	UTEP	1	1972–1973	29	196	44	15	93	6.8	1.5	0.5	3.2	
Tyler Ennis	G	Syracuse	1	2014–2015	8	58	7	14	22	7.3	0.9	1.8	2.8	
Keith Erickson	F	UCLA	4	1973–1977	239	6,301	1,133	664	2,632	26.4	4.7	2.8	11.0	
Drew Eubanks	C	Oregon State	1	2023–2024	75	1,169	322	63	379	15.6	4.3	0.8	5.1	
Jawun Evans	G	Oklahoma State	1	2018–2019	7	64	12	10	6	9.1	1.7	1.4	0.9	

=== F to G ===
All-time roster
Player	Pos.	Pre-draft team	Yrs	Seasons	Statistics									Ref.
Player	Pos.	Pre-draft team	Yrs	Seasons	GP	MP	REB	AST	PTS	MPG	RPG	APG	PPG	Ref.
Butch Feher	G	Vanderbilt	1	1976–1977	48	487	74	36	248	10.1	1.5	0.8	5.2	
Michael Finley	G/F	Wisconsin	2	1995–1997	109	4,008	494	357	1,585	36.8	4.5	3.3	14.5	
Rasheer Fleming^{x}	F	Saint Joseph's	1	2025–2026	55	673	124	16	238	12.2	2.3	0.3	4.3	
Alton Ford	F	Houston	2	2001–2003	64	483	113	8	171	7.5	1.8	0.1	2.7	
Sharrod Ford	F	Clemson	1	2005–2006	3	13	3	0	4	4.3	1.0	0.0	1.3	
Bayard Forrest	C	Grand Canyon	2	1977–1979	139	2,130	565	296	569	15.3	4.1	2.1	4.1	
Rod Foster	G	UCLA	3	1983–1986	207	3,446	258	479	1,562	16.6	1.2	2.3	7.5	
Jim Fox	C	South Carolina	2	1968–1970	132	4,020	1,249	236	1,747	30.5	9.5	1.8	13.2	
Jimmer Fredette	G	BYU	1	2018–2019	6	65	7	8	22	10.8	1.2	1.3	3.7	
Channing Frye	F/C	Arizona	4	2009–2013; 2014–2015	304	8,712	1,735	395	3,464	28.7	5.7	1.3	11.4	
Langston Galloway	G	Saint Joseph's	1	2020–2021	40	438	42	26	190	11.0	1.1	0.7	4.8	
Rubén Garcés	F	Providence	1	2000–2001	10	62	22	4	16	6.2	2.2	0.4	1.6	
Diante Garrett	G	Iowa State	1	2012–2013	19	149	15	31	40	7.8	0.8	1.6	2.1	
Pat Garrity	F	Notre Dame	1	1998–1999	39	538	75	18	217	13.8	1.9	0.5	5.6	
Kenny Gattison	F	Old Dominion	2	1986–1987; 1988–1989	79	1,113	271	36	405	14.1	3.4	0.5	5.1	
Collin Gillespie^{x}	G	Villanova	2	2024–2026	113	2,743	405	449	1,206	24.3	3.6	4.0	10.7	
Armen Gilliam	F	UNLV	3	1987–1990	145	4,194	1,045	132	2,134	28.9	7.2	0.9	14.7	
Gordan Giriček	G	(Croatia) Cibona	1	2007–2008	22	442	51	35	193	20.1	2.3	1.6	8.8	
Georgi Glouchkov	F	(Bulgaria) Cherno More Port Varna	1	1985–1986	49	772	163	32	239	15.8	3.3	0.7	4.9	
Grant Gondrezick	G	Pepperdine	1	1986–1987	64	836	110	81	349	13.1	1.7	1.3	5.5	
Gail Goodrich^	G	UCLA	2	1968–1970	162	6,470	777	1,123	3,555	39.9	4.8	6.9	21.9	
Archie Goodwin	G	Kentucky	3	2013–2016	150	2,182	303	182	930	14.5	2.0	1.2	6.2	
Jordan Goodwin^{x}	G	Saint Louis	2	2023–2024; 2025–2026	110	2,130	458	229	807	19.4	4.2	2.1	7.3	
Eric Gordon	G/F	Indiana	1	2023–2024	68	1,893	122	139	749	27.8	1.8	2.0	11.0	
Marcin Gortat	C	(Germany) RheinStars Köln	3	2010–2013	182	5,626	1,688	187	2,414	30.9	9.3	1.0	13.3	
Brian Grant	F	Xavier	1	2005–2006	21	248	57	7	61	11.8	2.7	0.3	2.9	
Greg Grant	G	TCNJ	1	1989–1990	67	678	59	168	208	10.1	0.9	2.5	3.1	
Josh Gray	G	LSU	1	2017–2018	5	86	10	12	32	17.2	2.0	2.4	6.4	
A.C. Green	F	Oregon State	4	1993–1997	273	8,173	2,114	353	2,885	29.9	7.7	1.3	10.6	
Gerald Green	G/F	Gulf Shores Academy (TX)	2	2013–2015	156	3,776	461	213	2,179	24.2	3.0	1.4	14.0	
Jalen Green^{x}	G	Prolific Prep (CA)	1	2025–2026	32	828	116	91	568	25.9	3.6	2.8	17.8	
Lamar Green	F/C	Morehead State	5	1969–1974	345	6,168	2,186	247	1,806	17.9	6.3	0.7	5.2	
Gary Gregor	F	South Carolina	1	1968–1969	80	2,182	711	96	885	27.3	8.9	1.2	11.1	
Greg Griffin	F	Idaho State	1	1977–1978	36	422	103	24	145	11.7	2.9	0.7	4.0	
Taylor Griffin	F	Oklahoma	1	2009–2010	8	32	2	1	10	4.0	0.3	0.1	1.3	
Tom Gugliotta	F	NC State	6	1998–2004	255	6,369	1,438	429	2,311	25.0	5.6	1.7	9.1	

=== H ===
All-time roster
Player	Pos.	Pre-draft team	Yrs	Seasons	Statistics									Ref.
Player	Pos.	Pre-draft team	Yrs	Seasons	GP	MP	REB	AST	PTS	MPG	RPG	APG	PPG	Ref.
Hamed Haddadi	C	(Iran) Paykan Tehran	1	2012–2013	17	235	87	8	69	13.8	5.1	0.5	4.1	
Penny Hardaway	G	Memphis	5	1999–2004	236	7,480	1,071	986	2,924	31.7	4.5	4.2	12.4	
Jared Harper	G	Auburn	1	2019–2020	3	8	0	0	2	2.7	0.0	0.0	0.7	
Art Harris	G	Stanford	3	1969–1972	153	2,472	255	361	1,118	16.2	1.7	2.4	7.3	
Shaquille Harrison	G	Tulsa	1	2017–2018	23	384	61	55	152	16.7	2.7	2.4	6.6	
Donnell Harvey	F	Florida	1	2003–2004	36	438	92	13	141	12.2	2.6	0.4	3.9	
Clem Haskins	G	Western Kentucky	4	1970–1974	319	8,620	989	1,135	4,407	27.0	3.1	3.6	13.8	
Connie Hawkins^ (#42)	F	Iowa	5	1969–1974	311	11,763	2,806	1,341	6,368	37.8	9.0	4.3	20.5	
Nate Hawthorne	G	Southern Illinois	2	1974–1976	129	1,762	301	85	776	13.7	2.3	0.7	6.0	
Nigel Hayes-Davis	F	Wisconsin	1	2025–2026	27	195	33	7	34	7.2	1.2	0.3	1.3	
Gar Heard	F	Oklahoma	5	1975–1980	307	7,298	2,181	442	2,313	23.8	7.1	1.4	7.5	
Skeeter Henry	G	Oklahoma	1	1993–1994	4	15	2	4	4	3.8	0.5	1.0	1.0	
Johnny High	G	Nevada	4	1979–1981; 1982–1984	274	4,538	617	525	1,396	16.6	2.3	1.9	5.1	
Haywood Highsmith^{x}	F	Wheeling	1	2025–2026	7	91	13	7	38	13.0	1.9	1.0	5.4	
Grant Hill^	G/F	Duke	5	2007–2012	362	10,884	1,712	889	4,371	30.1	4.7	2.5	12.1	
Craig Hodges	G	Long Beach State	2	1987–1989	33	554	37	52	271	16.8	1.1	1.6	8.2	
Aaron Holiday	G	UCLA	1	2021–2022	22	358	55	75	149	16.3	2.5	3.4	6.8	
Richaun Holmes	C	Bowling Green	1	2018–2019	70	1,184	331	60	572	16.9	4.7	0.9	8.2	
Michael Holton	G	UCLA	2	1984–1986	78	1,826	135	205	636	23.4	1.7	2.6	8.2	
Jeff Hornacek^{+}	G	Iowa State	6	1986–1992	468	14,380	1,753	2,523	6,420	30.7	3.7	5.4	13.7	
Robert Horry	F	Alabama	1	1996–1997	32	719	119	54	220	22.5	3.7	1.7	6.9	
Danuel House Jr.	G	Texas A&M	1	2017–2018	23	403	76	25	152	17.5	3.3	1.1	6.6	
Eddie House	G	Arizona State	1	2005–2006	81	1,421	132	148	796	17.5	1.6	1.8	9.8	
Greg Howard	F	New Mexico	1	1970–1971	44	426	119	26	173	9.7	2.7	0.6	3.9	
Jay Humphries	G	Colorado	4	1984–1988	294	8,931	835	1,862	3,165	30.4	2.8	6.3	10.8	
Kris Humphries	F	Minnesota	1	2015–2016	4	74	32	7	29	18.5	8.0	1.8	7.3	
Steven Hunter	C	DePaul	1	2004–2005	76	1,046	227	13	348	13.8	3.0	0.2	4.6	
C. J. Huntley^{x}	F	Appalachian State	1	2025–2026	4	40	5	2	12	10.0	1.3	0.5	3.0	
Chandler Hutchison	F	Boise State	1	2021–2022	6	22	5	2	4	3.7	0.8	0.3	0.7	

=== I to J ===
All-time roster
Player	Pos.	Pre-draft team	Yrs	Seasons	Statistics									Ref.
Player	Pos.	Pre-draft team	Yrs	Seasons	GP	MP	REB	AST	PTS	MPG	RPG	APG	PPG	Ref.
Oso Ighodaro^{x}	F	Marquette	2	2024–2026	143	2,853	640	256	786	20.0	4.5	1.8	5.5	
Greg Jackson	G	Guilford	1	1974–1975	44	775	67	93	174	17.6	1.5	2.1	4.0	
Jim Jackson	G	Ohio State	2	2004–2006	67	1,417	218	128	451	21.1	3.3	1.9	6.7	
Josh Jackson	G/F	Kansas	2	2017–2019	156	3,947	698	302	1,922	25.3	4.5	1.9	12.3	
Justin Jackson	F	North Carolina	1	2021–2022	6	35	7	2	13	5.8	1.2	0.3	2.2	
Casey Jacobsen	G/F	Stanford	3	2002–2005	190	3,743	351	208	1,046	19.7	1.8	1.1	5.5	
Mike James	G	Lamar	1	2017–2018	32	669	89	120	332	20.9	2.8	3.8	10.4	
Cory Jefferson	F	Baylor	1	2015–2016	8	50	16	0	22	6.3	2.0	0.0	2.8	
John Jenkins	G	Vanderbilt	2	2015–2017	26	300	36	27	116	11.5	1.4	1.0	4.5	
Ty Jerome	G	Virginia	1	2019–2020	31	328	46	44	102	10.6	1.5	1.4	3.3	
Cameron Johnson	G/F	North Carolina	4	2019–2023	200	4,851	724	280	2,135	24.3	3.6	1.4	10.7	
Dennis Johnson^	G	Pepperdine	3	1980–1983	236	8,103	1,108	1,048	4,140	34.3	4.7	4.4	17.5	
Eddie Johnson	G/F	Illinois	4	1987–1991	222	6,343	916	466	4,081	28.6	4.1	2.1	18.4	
Frank Johnson	G	Wake Forest	2	1992–1994	147	1,997	195	334	656	13.6	1.3	2.3	4.5	
Gus Johnson^	F	Idaho	1	1972–1973	21	417	136	31	163	19.9	6.5	1.5	7.8	
Joe Johnson	G/F	Arkansas	4	2001–2005	275	9,739	1,189	968	3,847	35.4	4.3	3.5	14.0	
Kevin Johnson^{+} (#7)	G	California	12	1987–1998; 1999–2000	683	24,018	2,332	6,518	12,747	35.2	3.4	9.5	18.7	
Linton Johnson	F	Tulane	1	2007–2008	6	53	13	3	15	8.8	2.2	0.5	2.5	
Neil Johnson	F	Creighton	2	1968–1970	108	1,455	443	146	512	13.5	4.1	1.4	4.7	
Orlando Johnson	G	UC Santa Barbara	1	2015–2016	2	47	9	0	16	23.5	4.5	0.0	8.0	
Tyler Johnson	G	Fresno State	2	2018–2020	44	921	104	104	322	20.9	2.4	2.4	7.3	
Wesley Johnson	G/F	Syracuse	1	2012–2013	50	953	123	34	399	19.1	2.5	0.7	8.0	
Charles Jones	F	Louisville	2	1984–1986	121	2,307	587	180	854	19.1	4.9	1.5	7.1	
Damian Jones	C	Vanderbilt	1	2020–2021	14	94	18	4	22	6.7	1.3	0.3	1.6	
Derrick Jones Jr.	F	UNLV	2	2016–2018	38	578	83	15	177	15.2	2.2	0.4	4.7	
Dwayne Jones	F	Saint Joseph's	1	2009–2010	2	7	2	0	0	3.5	1.0	0.0	0.0	
James Jones	G/F	Miami (FL)	2	2005–2007	151	3,148	429	102	1,184	20.8	2.8	0.7	7.8	
Jumaine Jones	F	Georgia	1	2006–2007	18	138	23	1	40	7.7	1.3	0.1	2.2	
Tyus Jones	G	Duke	1	2024–2025	81	2,174	196	429	829	26.8	2.4	5.3	10.2	

=== K to L ===
All-time roster
Player	Pos.	Pre-draft team	Yrs	Seasons	Statistics									Ref.
Player	Pos.	Pre-draft team	Yrs	Seasons	GP	MP	REB	AST	PTS	MPG	RPG	APG	PPG	Ref.
Frank Kaminsky	C	Wisconsin	3	2019–2022	95	1,673	405	167	783	17.6	4.3	1.8	8.2	
Rich Kelley	F/C	Stanford	3	1979–1982	185	3,951	1,056	625	1,339	21.4	5.7	3.4	7.2	
Tim Kempton	F/C	Notre Dame	1	1992–1993	30	167	39	19	56	5.6	1.3	0.6	1.9	
Steve Kerr	G	Arizona	1	1988–1989	26	157	17	24	54	6.0	0.7	0.9	2.1	
Jason Kidd^	G	California	5	1996–2001	309	12,032	1,985	3,011	4,440	38.9	6.4	9.7	14.4	
George King	G/F	Colorado	1	2018–2019	1	6	1	0	0	6.0	1.0	0.0	0.0	
Joe Kleine	C	Arkansas	5	1993–1997; 1998–1999	259	3,218	731	152	875	12.4	2.8	0.6	3.4	
Brandon Knight	G	Kentucky	3	2014–2017	117	3,357	343	442	1,760	28.7	2.9	3.8	15.0	
Brevin Knight	G	Stanford	1	2003–2004	3	19	3	4	2	6.3	1.0	1.3	0.7	
Negele Knight	G	Dayton	4	1990–1994	159	2,319	181	448	899	14.6	1.1	2.8	5.7	
Rod Knowles	F/C	Davidson	1	1968–1969	8	40	9	0	9	5.0	1.1	0.0	1.1	
Joel Kramer	F/C	San Diego State	5	1978–1983	328	4,184	916	343	1,257	12.8	2.8	1.0	3.8	
Viacheslav Kravtsov	C	(Ukraine) BC Kyiv	1	2013–2014	20	59	17	1	20	3.0	0.9	0.1	1.0	
Maciej Lampe	C	(Spain) Real Madrid Baloncesto	2	2003–2005	37	343	76	10	140	9.3	2.1	0.3	3.8	
Jock Landale	C	Saint Mary's	1	2022–2023	69	979	280	68	456	14.2	4.1	1.0	6.6	
Andrew Lang	C	Arkansas	4	1988–1992	280	4,654	1,267	100	1,350	16.6	4.5	0.4	4.8	
Antonio Lang	G/F	Duke	1	1994–1995	12	53	4	1	11	4.4	0.3	0.1	0.9	
Dan Langhi	F	Vanderbilt	1	2002–2003	60	541	87	21	183	9.0	1.5	0.4	3.1	
Dave Lattin	F/C	UTEP	1	1968–1969	68	987	323	48	409	14.5	4.8	0.7	6.0	
Gani Lawal	F	Georgia Tech	1	2010–2011	1	2	0	0	0	2.0	0.0	0.0	0.0	
Mo Layton	G	USC	2	1971–1973	145	2,839	241	386	1,194	19.6	1.7	2.7	8.2	
Jalen Lecque	G	Brewster Academy (NH)	1	2019–2020	5	32	2	2	10	6.4	0.4	0.4	2.0	
Damion Lee	G	Louisville	2	2022–2023; 2024–2025	99	1,650	245	110	687	16.7	2.5	1.1	6.9	
Ron Lee	G	Oregon	3	1976–1979	207	4,725	666	700	2,260	22.8	3.2	3.4	10.9	
Saben Lee	G	Vanderbilt	2	2022–2024	47	548	76	95	216	11.7	1.6	2.0	4.6	
Tim Legler	G	La Salle	1	1989–1990	11	83	8	6	28	7.5	0.7	0.5	2.5	
Alex Len	C	Maryland	5	2013–2018	335	6,656	2,175	259	2,421	19.9	6.5	0.8	7.2	
Jon Leuer	F	Wisconsin	1	2015–2016	67	1,255	373	72	567	18.7	5.6	1.1	8.5	
Nassir Little	F	North Carolina	1	2023–2024	45	458	75	21	152	10.2	1.7	0.5	3.4	
Isaiah Livers^{x}	F	Michigan	1	2025–2026	36	347	61	21	65	9.6	1.7	0.6	1.8	
Randy Livingston	G	LSU	2	1998–2000	80	1,103	132	173	393	13.8	1.7	2.2	4.9	
Horacio Llamas	C	Grand Canyon	2	1996–1998	28	143	36	5	58	5.1	1.3	0.2	2.1	
Ian Lockhart	F	Tennessee	1	1990–1991	1	2	0	0	4	2.0	0.0	0.0	4.0	
Luc Longley	C	New Mexico	2	1998–2000	111	2,350	544	122	791	21.2	4.9	1.1	7.1	
Robin Lopez	C	Stanford	4	2008–2012	242	3,486	791	43	1,399	14.4	3.3	0.2	5.8	
Maurice Lucas^{+}	F/C	Marquette	3	1982–1985	215	6,565	2,081	567	3,306	30.5	9.7	2.6	15.4	
Phil Lumpkin	G	Miami (OH)	1	1975–1976	34	370	23	48	70	10.9	0.7	1.4	2.1	
Gabriel Lundberg	G	(Denmark) Horsens Idræts Club	1	2021–2022	4	44	7	11	13	11.0	1.8	2.8	3.3	

=== M ===
All-time roster
Player	Pos.	Pre-draft team	Yrs	Seasons	Statistics									Ref.
Player	Pos.	Pre-draft team	Yrs	Seasons	GP	MP	REB	AST	PTS	MPG	RPG	APG	PPG	Ref.
Malcolm Mackey	F/C	Georgia Tech	1	1993–1994	22	69	24	1	32	3.1	1.1	0.0	1.5	
Don MacLean	F	UCLA	1	1999–2000	16	143	23	8	42	8.9	1.4	0.5	2.6	
Kyle Macy	G	Kentucky	5	1980–1985	393	10,570	923	1,555	4,180	26.9	2.3	4.0	10.6	
Dan Majerle^{+} (#9)	G/F	Central Michigan	8	1988–1995; 2001–2002	595	19,409	2,823	1,824	8,034	32.6	4.7	3.1	13.5	
Théo Maledon	G	(France) ASVEL	1	2023–2024	4	13	1	0	5	3.3	0.3	0.0	1.3	
Khaman Maluach^{x}	C	Duke	1	2025–2026	46	411	133	6	139	8.9	2.9	0.1	3.0	
Danny Manning	F/C	Kansas	5	1994–1999	276	7,438	1,499	644	3,703	26.9	5.4	2.3	13.4	
Stephon Marbury^{+}	G	Georgia Tech	3	2001–2004	197	7,842	646	1,601	4,188	39.8	3.3	8.1	21.3	
Shawn Marion^{+} (#31)	F	UNLV	9	1999–2008	660	24,948	6,616	1,332	12,134	37.8	10.0	2.0	18.4	
Sean Marks	F/C	California	2	2006–2008	22	147	39	4	65	6.7	1.8	0.2	3.0	
Kendall Marshall	G	North Carolina	1	2012–2013	48	702	42	143	143	14.6	0.9	3.0	3.0	
Bill Martin	F	Georgetown	1	1987–1988	10	101	27	6	40	10.1	2.7	0.6	4.0	
Cody Martin	F	Nevada	1	2024–2025	14	206	48	16	52	14.7	3.4	1.1	3.7	
Walter McCarty	F	Kentucky	1	2004–2005	28	353	61	11	98	12.6	2.2	0.4	3.5	
Ted McClain	G	Tennessee State	1	1978–1979	36	465	69	60	166	12.9	1.9	1.7	4.6	
George McCloud	G/F	Florida State	2	1997–1999	111	2,458	380	163	884	22.1	3.4	1.5	8.0	
John McCullough	G	Oklahoma	1	1981–1982	8	23	4	3	21	2.9	0.5	0.4	2.6	
Xavier McDaniel	F	Wichita State	1	1990–1991	66	2,105	476	149	1,046	31.9	7.2	2.3	15.8	
Antonio McDyess	F/C	Alabama	2	1997–1998; 2003–2004	105	2,947	751	122	1,363	28.1	7.2	1.2	13.0	
JaVale McGee	C	Nevada	1	2021–2022	74	1,172	496	42	680	15.8	6.7	0.6	9.2	
Mike McGee	G/F	Michigan	1	1989–1990	14	280	36	16	102	20.0	2.6	1.1	7.3	
Stan McKenzie	G/F	NYU	2	1968–1970	138	2,094	344	175	967	15.2	2.5	1.3	7.0	
McCoy McLemore	F/C	Drake	1	1968–1969	31	710	168	50	367	22.9	5.4	1.6	11.8	
Jerel McNeal	G	Marquette	1	2014–2015	6	36	3	2	9	6.0	0.5	0.3	1.5	
Paul McPherson	G	DePaul	1	2000–2001	33	308	48	16	112	9.3	1.5	0.5	3.4	
Jordan McRae	G	Tennessee	1	2015–2016	7	82	8	10	37	11.7	1.1	1.4	5.3	
Gary Melchionni	G	Duke	2	1973–1975	137	2,780	329	298	1,074	20.3	2.4	2.2	7.8	
De'Anthony Melton	G	USC	1	2018–2019	50	984	134	159	250	19.7	2.7	3.2	5.0	
Chimezie Metu	F/C	USC	1	2023–2024	37	448	110	19	185	12.1	3.0	0.5	5.0	
Loren Meyer	C	Iowa State	1	1996–1997	35	449	96	12	188	12.8	2.7	0.3	5.4	
Vasilije Micić	G	(Serbia) Mega Vizura	1	2024–2025	5	21	2	1	0	4.2	0.4	0.2	0.0	
Marko Milič	G/F	(Slovenia) Olimpija	2	1997–1999	44	216	30	14	108	4.9	0.7	0.3	2.5	
Oliver Miller	C	Arkansas	3	1992–1994; 1999–2000	176	3,943	1,012	430	1,272	22.4	5.8	2.4	7.2	
Elijah Millsap	G/F	UAB	1	2016–2017	2	23	6	1	3	11.5	3.0	0.5	1.5	
Greg Monroe	F/C	Georgetown	1	2017–2018	20	465	160	50	225	23.3	8.0	2.5	11.3	
E'Twaun Moore	G	Purdue	1	2020–2021	27	389	45	40	133	14.4	1.7	1.5	4.9	
Otto Moore	F/C	UTPA	1	1971–1972	81	1,624	540	88	614	20.0	6.7	1.1	7.6	
Ron Moore	C	West Virginia State	1	1987–1988	5	34	6	0	14	6.8	1.2	0.0	2.8	
Eric Moreland	F/C	Oregon State	1	2018–2019	1	5	3	0	0	5.0	3.0	0.0	0.0	
Chris Morris	F	Auburn	1	1998–1999	44	535	121	23	184	12.2	2.8	0.5	4.2	
Marcus Morris	F	Kansas	3	2012–2015	186	4,215	762	236	1,772	22.7	4.1	1.3	9.5	
Markieff Morris	F	Kansas	5	2011–2016	345	8,715	1,860	596	3,940	25.3	5.4	1.7	11.4	
Monté Morris	G	Iowa State	1	2024–2025	45	571	67	73	233	12.7	1.5	1.6	5.2	
Mike Morrison	G	Loyola (MD)	1	1989–1990	36	153	20	11	72	4.3	0.6	0.3	2.0	
Jerrod Mustaf	F/C	Maryland	3	1991–1994	117	1,077	283	63	453	9.2	2.4	0.5	3.9	

=== N to P ===
All-time roster
Player	Pos.	Pre-draft team	Yrs	Seasons	Statistics									Ref.
Player	Pos.	Pre-draft team	Yrs	Seasons	GP	MP	REB	AST	PTS	MPG	RPG	APG	PPG	Ref.
Abdel Nader	F	Iowa State	2	2020–2022	38	500	89	26	194	13.2	2.3	0.7	5.1	
Larry Nance^{+}	F	Clemson	7	1981–1988	487	15,731	3,791	1,248	8,430	32.3	7.8	2.6	17.3	
Steve Nash^ (#13)	G	Santa Clara	10	1996–1998; 2004–2012	744	22,781	2,293	6,997	10,712	30.6	3.1	9.4	14.4	
Ed Nealy	F	Kansas State	3	1988–1989; 1990–1992	137	1,242	317	81	302	9.1	2.3	0.6	2.2	
Mike Niles	F	Cal State Fullerton	1	1980–1981	44	231	58	15	115	5.3	1.3	0.3	2.6	
Jusuf Nurkić	C	(Croatia) Cedevita	2	2023–2025	101	2,670	1,066	348	1,044	26.4	10.6	3.4	10.3	
Élie Okobo	G	(France) Élan Béarnais	2	2018–2020	108	1,677	188	242	523	15.5	1.7	2.2	4.8	
Josh Okogie	G	Georgia Tech	3	2022–2025	157	2,661	477	183	956	16.9	3.0	1.2	6.1	
Jimmy Oliver	G/F	Purdue	1	1998–1999	2	11	0	0	3	5.5	0.0	0.0	1.5	
Jermaine O'Neal	F/C	Eau Claire HS (SC)	1	2012–2013	55	1,029	293	42	454	18.7	5.3	0.8	8.3	
Shaquille O'Neal^	C	LSU	2	2007–2009	103	3,055	929	174	1,695	29.7	9.0	1.7	16.5	
Royce O'Neale^{x}	F	Baylor	3	2023–2026	183	4,802	877	453	1,689	26.2	4.8	2.5	9.2	
Kelly Oubre Jr.	F	Kansas	2	2018–2020	96	3,113	557	149	1,720	32.4	5.8	1.6	17.9	
Bo Outlaw	F	Houston	3	2001–2003; 2004–2005	192	3,782	756	247	749	19.7	3.9	1.3	3.9	
Jim Owens	F	Arizona State	2	1973–1975	58	533	52	64	177	9.2	0.9	1.1	3.1	
Tariq Owens	F	Texas Tech	1	2019–2020	3	15	3	0	4	5.0	1.0	0.0	1.3	
Milt Palacio	G	Colorado State	1	2001–2002	28	272	23	29	79	9.7	0.8	1.0	2.8	
Smush Parker	G	Fordham	1	2004–2005	5	34	3	4	15	6.8	0.6	0.8	3.0	
Chris Paul^{+}	G	Wake Forest	3	2020–2023	194	6,227	846	1,848	2,926	32.1	4.4	9.5	15.1	
Cameron Payne	G	Murray State	4	2019–2023	174	3,508	456	737	1,711	20.2	2.6	4.2	9.8	
Elfrid Payton	G	Louisiana	2	2017–2018; 2021–2022	69	1,100	188	217	374	15.9	2.7	3.1	5.4	
Curtis Perry	F	Missouri State	4	1974–1978	239	7,250	2,269	495	2,746	30.3	9.5	2.1	11.5	
Elliot Perry	G	Memphis	4	1993–1996; 2000–2001	233	4,537	368	946	1,734	19.5	1.6	4.1	7.4	
Tim Perry	F/C	Temple	4	1988–1992	248	4,296	961	196	1,686	17.3	3.9	0.8	6.8	
Wesley Person	G	Auburn	3	1994–1997	240	6,735	814	366	2,939	28.1	3.4	1.5	12.2	
Alec Peters	F	Valparaiso	1	2017–2018	20	225	37	12	82	11.3	1.9	0.6	4.1	
Eric Piatkowski	G/F	Nebraska	2	2006–2008	27	186	21	14	66	6.9	0.8	0.5	2.4	
Mickaël Piétrus	G/F	(France) Élan Béarnais	1	2010–2011	38	689	76	23	283	18.1	2.0	0.6	7.4	
Ed Pinckney	F	Villanova	2	1985–1987	160	3,852	888	206	1,518	24.1	5.6	1.3	9.5	
Charles Pittman	F	Maryland	4	1982–1986	234	3,292	718	204	1,060	14.1	3.1	0.9	4.5	
Mason Plumlee	C	Duke	1	2024–2025	74	1,300	455	134	333	17.6	6.1	1.8	4.5	
Miles Plumlee	C	Duke	2	2013–2015	134	2,969	900	70	879	22.2	6.7	0.5	6.6	
Phil Pressey	G	Missouri	1	2015–2016	9	113	8	29	22	12.6	0.9	3.2	2.4	
A. J. Price	G	UConn	1	2014–2015	5	44	3	6	6	8.8	0.6	1.2	1.2	
Ronnie Price	G	Utah Valley	3	2011–2012; 2015–2017	112	1,862	166	232	476	16.6	1.5	2.1	4.3	

=== R to S ===
All-time roster
Player	Pos.	Pre-draft team	Yrs	Seasons	Statistics									Ref.
Player	Pos.	Pre-draft team	Yrs	Seasons	GP	MP	REB	AST	PTS	MPG	RPG	APG	PPG	Ref.
Kurt Rambis	F	Santa Clara	4	1989–1993	153	2,778	783	209	641	18.2	5.1	1.4	4.2	
Shavlik Randolph	F	Duke	2	2013–2015	30	196	51	4	37	6.5	1.7	0.1	1.2	
Joe Reaves	F	Bethel College	1	1973–1974	7	38	8	1	16	5.4	1.1	0.1	2.3	
Michael Redd	G	Ohio State	1	2011–2012	51	770	77	33	418	15.1	1.5	0.6	8.2	
Davon Reed	G	Miami (FL)	1	2017–2018	21	242	39	13	63	11.5	1.9	0.6	3.0	
Terrence Rencher	G	Texas	1	1995–1996	2	8	2	0	3	4.0	1.0	0.0	1.5	
Shawn Respert	G	Michigan State	1	1998–1999	12	99	13	8	37	8.3	1.1	0.7	3.1	
Nick Richards	C	Kentucky	2	2024–2026	64	1,070	399	29	431	16.7	6.2	0.5	6.7	
Jason Richardson	G	Michigan State	3	2008–2011	162	5,200	776	289	2,672	32.1	4.8	1.8	16.5	
Quentin Richardson	G	DePaul	1	2004–2005	79	2,839	479	158	1,176	35.9	6.1	2.0	14.9	
Pat Riley^	G/F	Kentucky	1	1975–1976	60	790	47	57	278	13.2	0.8	1.0	4.6	
Rick Robey	F/C	Kentucky	3	1983–1986	111	1,533	354	128	524	13.8	3.2	1.2	4.7	
Clifford Robinson	F/C	UConn	4	1997–2001	292	9,689	1,330	759	4,775	33.2	4.6	2.6	16.4	
Rumeal Robinson	G	Michigan	1	1996–1997	12	87	7	8	36	7.3	0.6	0.7	3.0	
Truck Robinson^{+}	F/C	Tennessee State	4	1978–1982	264	9,299	2,505	566	4,789	35.2	9.5	2.1	18.1	
David Roddy	F	Colorado State	1	2023–2024	17	63	11	4	22	3.7	0.6	0.2	1.3	
Rodney Rogers	F	Wake Forest	3	1999–2002	214	5,723	1,047	422	2,757	26.7	4.9	2.0	12.9	
Jalen Rose	G/F	Michigan	1	2006–2007	29	246	23	16	108	8.5	0.8	0.6	3.7	
Terrence Ross	G/F	Washington	1	2022–2023	21	386	69	41	188	18.4	3.3	2.0	9.0	
Ricky Rubio	G	(Spain) Juventut Badalona	1	2019–2020	65	2,016	304	570	847	31.0	4.7	8.8	13.0	
Trevor Ruffin	G	Hawaii	1	1994–1995	49	319	23	48	233	6.5	0.5	1.0	4.8	
Stefano Rusconi	F/C	(Italy) Pallacanestro Varese	1	1995–1996	7	30	6	3	8	4.3	0.9	0.4	1.1	
Dario Šarić	F	(Croatia) Cibona	3	2019–2021; 2022–2023	153	3,036	738	245	1,356	19.8	4.8	1.6	8.9	
Mike Sanders	G/F	UCLA	5	1983–1988	270	4,769	798	379	2,405	17.7	3.0	1.4	8.9	
Daniel Santiago	C	Saint Vincent	2	2000–2002	57	605	109	13	178	10.6	1.9	0.2	3.1	
Fred Saunders	F	Syracuse	2	1974–1976	86	1,205	290	93	480	14.0	3.4	1.1	5.6	
Danny Schayes	F/C	Syracuse	1	1994–1995	69	823	208	89	303	11.9	3.0	1.3	4.4	
Dale Schlueter	C	Colorado State	1	1976–1977	39	337	80	38	70	8.6	2.1	1.0	1.8	
Luis Scola	F	(Spain) Saski Baskonia	1	2012–2013	82	2,184	541	182	1,048	26.6	6.6	2.2	12.8	
Alvin Scott	G/F	Oral Roberts	8	1977–1985	627	10,853	1,992	847	3,088	17.3	3.2	1.4	4.9	
Charlie Scott^	G/F	North Carolina	4	1971–1975	208	7,834	860	1,103	5,163	37.7	4.1	5.3	24.8	
Dennis Scott	F	Georgia Tech	1	1997–1998	29	493	50	24	181	17.0	1.7	0.8	6.2	
Landry Shamet	G	Wichita State	2	2021–2023	109	2,244	193	201	919	20.6	1.8	1.8	8.4	
Paul Shirley	F/C	Iowa State	1	2004–2005	9	30	2	3	12	3.3	0.2	0.3	1.3	
John Shumate	F/C	Notre Dame	1	1975–1976	43	930	240	62	487	21.6	5.6	1.4	11.3	
Paul Silas^{+}	F/C	Creighton	3	1969–1972	239	8,862	2,886	804	3,360	37.1	12.1	3.4	14.1	
Garret Siler	C	Augusta	1	2010–2011	21	101	28	3	45	4.8	1.3	0.1	2.1	
Alvin Sims	G	Louisville	1	1998–1999	4	25	4	5	11	6.3	1.0	1.3	2.8	
Courtney Sims	C	Michigan	1	2008–2009	1	2	0	0	0	2.0	0.0	0.0	0.0	
Sean Singletary	G	Virginia	1	2008–2009	13	122	16	12	34	9.4	1.2	0.9	2.6	
Brian Skinner	F	Baylor	1	2007–2008	66	844	238	15	219	12.8	3.6	0.2	3.3	
Ish Smith	G	Wake Forest	1	2013–2014	70	1,006	129	179	261	14.4	1.8	2.6	3.7	
Jalen Smith	F/C	Maryland	2	2020–2022	56	538	176	10	228	9.6	3.1	0.2	4.1	
Tony Smith	G	Marquette	1	1995–1996	34	528	56	86	189	15.5	1.6	2.5	5.6	
Dick Snyder	G/F	Davidson	2	1968–1970	87	2,255	343	220	1,034	25.9	3.9	2.5	11.9	
Ricky Sobers	G	UNLV	2	1975–1977	157	3,903	493	453	1,789	24.9	3.1	2.9	11.4	
Ray Spalding	F	Louisville	1	2018–2019	13	147	48	5	54	11.3	3.7	0.4	4.2	
Alex Stivrins	F	Colorado	1	1992–1993	10	35	8	1	22	3.5	0.8	0.1	2.2	
Amar'e Stoudemire^ (#32)	F/C	Cypress Creek HS (FL)	8	2002–2010	516	17,686	4,613	677	11,035	34.3	8.9	1.3	21.4	
Paul Stovall	F	Arizona State	1	1972–1973	25	211	61	13	76	8.4	2.4	0.5	3.0	
D. J. Strawberry	G	Maryland	1	2007–2008	33	270	28	30	73	8.2	0.8	0.9	2.2	
Stromile Swift	F	LSU	1	2008–2009	13	121	33	2	39	9.3	2.5	0.2	3.0	
Aaron Swinson	F	Auburn	1	1994–1995	9	51	8	3	24	5.7	0.9	0.3	2.7	

=== T ===
All-time roster
Player	Pos.	Pre-draft team	Yrs	Seasons	Statistics									Ref.
Player	Pos.	Pre-draft team	Yrs	Seasons	GP	MP	REB	AST	PTS	MPG	RPG	APG	PPG	Ref.
Yuta Tabuse	G	BYU–Hawaii	1	2004–2005	4	17	4	3	7	4.3	1.0	0.8	1.8	
Fred Taylor	G/F	UTPA	2	1970–1972	67	621	103	58	314	9.3	1.5	0.9	4.7	
Mirza Teletović	F	(Spain) Saski Baskonia	1	2015–2016	79	1,686	302	89	965	21.3	3.8	1.1	12.2	
Sebastian Telfair	G	Abraham Lincoln HS (NY)	2	2011–2013	106	1,690	159	252	643	15.9	1.5	2.4	6.1	
Ira Terrell	F/C	SMU	1	1976–1977	78	1,751	387	103	665	22.4	5.0	1.3	8.5	
Emanuel Terry	F	Lincoln Memorial	2	2018–2019; 2021–2022	5	38	21	3	9	7.6	4.2	0.6	1.8	
David Thirdkill	G/F	Bradley	1	1982–1983	49	521	72	36	194	10.6	1.5	0.7	4.0	
Isaiah Thomas	G	Washington	2	2014–2015; 2023–2024	52	1,200	109	174	709	23.1	2.1	3.3	13.6	
Joe Thomas	F	Marquette	1	1970–1971	39	204	43	17	55	5.2	1.1	0.4	1.4	
Kurt Thomas	F	TCU	2	2005–2007	120	2,619	794	81	763	21.8	6.6	0.7	6.4	
Tim Thomas	F	Villanova	1	2005–2006	26	634	127	18	287	24.4	4.9	0.7	11.0	
Bernard Thompson	G/F	Fresno State	3	1985–1988	122	2,178	248	201	819	17.9	2.0	1.6	6.7	
Brooks Thompson	G	Oklahoma State	1	1997–1998	13	46	5	3	26	3.5	0.4	0.2	2.0	
Dijon Thompson	G/F	UCLA	1	2005–2006	10	43	11	1	28	4.3	1.1	0.1	2.8	
Marcus Thornton	G	LSU	1	2014–2015	9	81	13	2	32	9.0	1.4	0.2	3.6	
Wayman Tisdale	F/C	Oklahoma	3	1994–1997	181	3,206	581	123	1,668	17.7	3.2	0.7	9.2	
Anthony Tolliver	F/C	Creighton	1	2014–2015	24	272	44	10	80	11.3	1.8	0.4	3.3	
Sedric Toney	G	Dayton	1	1985–1986	10	206	23	26	75	20.6	2.3	2.6	7.5	
Cezary Trybański	C	(Poland) Znicz Pruszków	1	2003–2004	4	10	1	0	0	2.5	0.3	0.0	0.0	
Jake Tsakalidis	C	(Greece) AEK Athens	3	2000–2003	157	3,072	738	55	908	19.6	4.7	0.4	5.8	
Nikoloz Tskitishvili	F	(Italy) Benetton Treviso	1	2005–2006	12	86	20	3	33	7.2	1.7	0.3	2.8	
Alando Tucker	F	Wisconsin	3	2007–2010	47	401	46	15	203	8.5	1.0	0.3	4.3	
P. J. Tucker	F	Texas	5	2012–2017	377	10,950	2,235	622	3,032	29.0	5.9	1.6	8.0	
Hedo Türkoğlu	F	(Turkey) Anadolu Efes	1	2010–2011	25	630	100	58	237	25.2	4.0	2.3	9.5	

=== U to Z ===
All-time roster
Player	Pos.	Pre-draft team	Yrs	Seasons	Statistics									Ref.
Player	Pos.	Pre-draft team	Yrs	Seasons	GP	MP	REB	AST	PTS	MPG	RPG	APG	PPG	Ref.
Tyler Ulis	G	Kentucky	2	2016–2018	132	2,781	223	537	998	21.1	1.7	4.1	7.6	
Dick Van Arsdale^{+} (#5)	G/F	Indiana	9	1968–1977	685	24,242	2,452	2,396	12,060	35.4	3.6	3.5	17.6	
Tom Van Arsdale	G/F	Indiana	1	1976–1977	77	1,425	184	67	444	18.5	2.4	0.9	5.8	
Nick Vanos	C	Santa Clara	2	1985–1987	68	842	240	59	222	12.4	3.5	0.9	3.3	
Jake Voskuhl	C	UConn	4	2001–2005	228	3,813	910	128	1,062	16.7	4.0	0.6	4.7	
Jackson Vroman	F/C	Iowa State	1	2004–2005	10	57	13	7	16	5.7	1.3	0.7	1.6	
Ish Wainright	F	Baylor	3	2021–2024	109	1,290	198	69	362	11.8	1.8	0.6	3.3	
Neal Walk	C	Florida	5	1969–1974	408	11,232	3,637	966	6,010	27.5	8.9	2.4	14.7	
M. J. Walker	G/F	Florida State	1	2021–2022	2	8	1	1	0	4.0	0.5	0.5	0.0	
John Wallace	F	Syracuse	1	2001–2002	46	490	85	29	231	10.7	1.8	0.6	5.0	
Bob Warlick	G/F	Pepperdine	1	1968–1969	63	975	151	131	507	15.5	2.4	2.1	8.0	
T. J. Warren	F	NC State	6	2014–2019; 2022–2023	277	7,431	1,127	304	3,821	26.8	4.1	1.1	13.8	
Hakim Warrick	F	Syracuse	2	2010–2012	115	1,919	388	99	894	16.7	3.4	0.9	7.8	
Duane Washington Jr.	G	Ohio State	1	2022–2023	31	394	36	63	244	12.7	1.2	2.0	7.9	
TyTy Washington Jr.	G	Kentucky	1	2024–2025	16	118	13	16	35	7.4	0.8	1.0	2.2	
Yuta Watanabe	F	George Washington	1	2023–2024	29	382	45	10	104	13.2	1.6	0.3	3.6	
Jeff Webb	G	Kansas State	1	1971–1972	27	129	17	16	67	4.8	0.6	0.6	2.5	
Sonny Weems	G/F	Arkansas	1	2015–2016	36	421	41	47	90	11.7	1.1	1.3	2.5	
Walt Wesley	C	Kansas	1	1972–1973	45	364	113	24	144	8.1	2.5	0.5	3.2	
Mark West	F/C	Old Dominion	8	1987–1994; 1999–2000	543	11,647	3,241	231	3,761	21.4	6.0	0.4	6.9	
Paul Westphal^ (#44)	G	USC	6	1975–1980; 1983–1984	465	14,212	1,002	2,429	9,564	30.6	2.2	5.2	20.6	
John Wetzel	G/F	Virginia Tech	3	1970–1972; 1975–1976	158	1,759	256	189	481	11.1	1.6	1.2	3.0	
Jahidi White	F/C	Georgetown	1	2003–2004	61	861	261	7	261	14.1	4.3	0.1	4.3	
Rory White	F	South Alabama	2	1982–1984	87	934	167	44	486	10.7	1.9	0.5	5.6	
Alan Williams	F/C	UC Santa Barbara	3	2015–2018	62	846	352	36	395	13.6	5.7	0.6	6.4	
Earl Williams	F/C	Winston-Salem State	1	1974–1975	79	1,040	456	95	371	13.2	5.8	1.2	4.7	
Hot Rod Williams	F/C	Tulane	3	1995–1998	201	5,122	1,246	211	1,251	25.5	6.2	1.0	6.2	
Mark Williams^{x}	C	Duke	1	2025–2026	60	1,416	477	58	700	23.6	8.0	1.0	11.7	
Micheal Williams	G	Baylor	1	1989–1990	6	26	1	4	5	4.3	0.2	0.7	0.8	
Scott Williams	F/C	North Carolina	2	2002–2004	85	1,139	265	28	390	13.4	3.1	0.3	4.6	
George Wilson	C	Cincinnati	1	1968–1969	41	1,294	505	76	475	31.6	12.3	1.9	11.6	
David Wood	F	Nevada	1	1995–1996	4	34	5	2	4	8.5	1.3	0.5	1.0	
Brandan Wright	F/C	North Carolina	1	2014–2015	40	858	194	23	280	21.5	4.9	0.6	7.0	
Michael Young	G/F	Houston	1	1984–1985	2	11	2	0	4	5.5	1.0	0.0	2.0	
Thaddeus Young	F	Georgia Tech	1	2023–2024	10	89	28	7	23	8.9	2.8	0.7	2.3	
Luke Zeller	C	Notre Dame	1	2012–2013	16	58	10	3	19	3.6	0.6	0.2	1.2	

== See also ==
- Phoenix Suns roster
- Phoenix Suns current roster
