= Mladost =

Mladost (meaning "youth" in Slavic languages) may refer to:

== Places ==
- Mladost, Sofia, city district in Bulgaria
- Mladost, Varna, city district in Bulgaria
- Sports park Mladost, in Zagreb, Croatia

== Association football clubs ==
- FK Mladost (disambiguation)
- NK Mladost (disambiguation)

== Basketball clubs ==
- KK Mladost (disambiguation)

== Other sports clubs ==
- Mladost (sports society), Croatian sports society based in Zagreb
  - HAOK Mladost, volleyball section
  - HAVK Mladost, water polo section
  - HAKK Mladost, basketball section
- KHL Mladost, Croatian ice hockey club based in Zagreb
