= NK Mladost =

NK Mladost (NK being Croatian and Slovene for nogometni klub, lit. 'football club') may refer to:

- NK Mladost 127, former name of the Croatian club HNK Suhopolje
- NK Mladost Cernik, Croatian club based in Cernik
- NK Mladost Proložac, Croatian club based in Proložac
- NK Mladost Lištica, former name of NK Široki Brijeg used from the late 1950s to 1991
- NK Mladost Prelog
- NK Mladost Ždralovi
- NK Mladost Kranj, former name of NK Sava Kranj used from 1945 to 1974

== See also ==
- Mladost (disambiguation)
