= Rich Dumas =

American basketball player (1944–1991)

Personal information
- Born: April 21, 1944 Oklahoma City, Oklahoma, U.S.
- Died: November 19, 1991 (aged 47) Berlin, Germany
- Listed height: 6 ft 5 in (1.96 m)
- Listed weight: 170 lb (77 kg)

Career information
- High school: Sumner (Kansas City, Kansas)
- College: Independence CC (1964–1966); Northeastern State (1966–1968)
- NBA draft: 1968: 7th round, 83rd overall pick
- Drafted by: Cincinnati Royals
- Position: Shooting guard
- Number: 25

Career history
- 1968: Houston Mavericks
- Stats at Basketball Reference

Richard Wayne Dumas Sr. (April 21, 1944 – November 19, 1991) was an American basketball player. A 6'5" shooting guard, he starred at Northeastern State before playing professionally for the Houston Mavericks in the American Basketball Association.

== Early life ==
Dumas was born in Oklahoma City but later moved to Kansas City where he attended Sumner High School. There he was the city's leading scorer during his senior season, scoring 408 points in 18 games.

== College career ==
After spending two years at Independence Community College, where he led the Jayhawk Junior College Conference in scoring in 1966, Dumas joined Northeastern State University where he starred alongside future NBA player Charlie Paulk. On February 1, 1968, he set the schools single game scoring record when he scored 50 points in a 96–84 victory against John Brown University, breaking Bob Edwards record of 47 points from 1962.

== Professional career ==
Dumas was drafted by the Cincinnati Royals in the seventh round of the 1968 NBA draft. In June 1968, he signed with the Houston Mavericks of the American Basketball Association (ABA). During the preseason in October, he led all scorers with 22 points in the Rockets 119–113 exhibition victory against the New Orleans Buccaneers. He later appeared in the Mavericks' opening game of the 1968–69 regular season, but was waived a week later along with Bill Gaines.

== Later life and death ==
Following his basketball career, Dumas became a civilian recreational director for the United States Air Force. He died in a hospital in Berlin on November 19, 1991.

== Personal life ==
Dumas was the father of basketball player Richard Dumas.
