= KK Mladost =

KK Mladost may refer to the following basketball teams:

== Bosnia and Herzegovina ==
- KK Mladost Mrkonjić Grad, based in Mrkonjić Grad
- KK Mladost 1976, based in Prnjavor
- KK Mladost Bosanski Petrovac, based in Bosanski Petrovac
- KK Mladost Gacko, based in Gacko
- KK Mladost Kotor Varoš, based in Kotor Varoš
- KK Mladost Rogatica, based in Rogatica
- KK Mladost Široki Brijeg, based in Široki Brijeg (1974–1992); later renamed to HKK Široki

== Croatia ==
- HAKK Mladost, based in Zagreb
- KK Mladost Čačinci, based in Čačinci, Virovitica-Podravina County
- KK Mladost Đurđevac, based in Đurđevac, Koprivnica-Križevci County

== Montenegro ==
- KK Mladost Nikšić, based in Nikšić (1962–1966); later renamed to KK Sutjeska

== Serbia ==
- KK Mladost Zemun, based in Zemun (1954–present)
- KK Mladost SP, based in Smederevska Palanka (1970–present)
- KK Mladost Čačak, based in Čačak (1995–present)
- KK Mladost Aleksinac, based in Aleksinac (1957–1976); later renamed to KK Napredak Aleksinac
- KK Mladost Vršac, based in Vršac (1959–1967); later renamed to KK Vršac
- KK Mladost Palanka, based in Smederevska Palanka (2007–2014), later renamed to KK Radnički 1950
- KK Mladost Veternik, based in Veternik
- KK Mladost Bački Jarak, based in Bački Jarak, Temerin
- KK Mladost Zaječar, based in Zaječar
- KK Mladost Vesna, based in Bela Palanka
- KK Mladost Omoljica, based in Omoljica
- KK Mladost 2014, based in Ub

== See also ==
- FK Mladost (disambiguation)
