= Martin Vanjak =

Croatian basketball player

Personal information
- Born: March 8, 1977 (age 49) Zadar, SR Croatia, SFR Yugoslavia
- Listed height: 188 cm (6 ft 2 in)

Career information
- Playing career: 1995–2005
- Position: Guard

Career history
- 1995-1998: Zrinjevac
- 1998-2000: Zadar
- 2000-2001: Šibenka
- 2001-2005: Široki

Career highlights
- Bosnian League champion (2004)

Martin Vanjak (born 8 March 1977) is a Croatian retired professional basketball player who played as a guard. Born in Zadar, he played for several clubs in Croatia and Bosnia and Herzegovina during the late 1990s and early 2000s, most notably for HKK Široki, with whom he won the Basketball Championship of Bosnia and Herzegovina in 2004.

== Early life ==
Vanjak was born in Zadar, a Croatian city known for its basketball tradition. He began playing basketball at the age of nine and developed through the local basketball system.

== Professional career ==
Vanjak began his professional career in Croatia, playing for KK Zrinjevac in Zagreb before later appearing for KK Zadar and KK Šibenka.

He later moved to Bosnia and Herzegovina where he played for HKK Široki, then known as Široki Hercegtisak for sponsporship reasons. During his time with the club he competed in the ABA League, as well as European competitions such as the FIBA Europe League, the FIBA Korać Cup, and the FIBA Saporta Cup.

One of the highlights of his career came in the 2003–04 season when he led Široki to a win in the Basketball Championship of Bosnia and Herzegovina. In the final game of the finals series versus Bosna in a sold-out Skenderija he scored 32 points and was named MVP.

Standing 188 cm tall, Vanjak played primarily as a point guard and was known for his scoring and shooting ability.

== Retirement ==
Vanjak shocked the former Yugoslav basketball community when he decided to retire from professional basketball at the age of 27. During his playing career he studied law at the University of Split and later pursued a legal career after retiring from basketball.

== Legacy ==
Vanjak is widely regarded as one of the greatest players in the history of HKK Široki and one of the most prolific scorers in the history of the Bosnian League, as well as the ABA League during the early 2000s. Known for his scoring ability in clutch moments and leadership on the court, he played a key role in establishing Široki as one of the dominant clubs in Bosnian basketball. Despite his success, Vanjak remains an enigmatic figure due to his decision to retire from professional basketball at only 27.
