= HKK Široki =

Professional basketball club in Bosnia and Herzegovina

Široki
- Nickname: Ponos Hercegovine (Pride of Herzegovina)
- Leagues: Bosnian League; ABA League
- Founded: 5 April 1974; 52 years ago
- History: KK Mladost (1974–1992); HKK Široki (1994–present)
- Arena: Pecara Sports Hall
- Capacity: 4,500
- Location: Široki Brijeg, Bosnia and Herzegovina
- Team colors: Blue, White
- Head coach: Marijan Bagarić
- Championships: 10 Bosnian Leagues; 8 Bosnian Cups
- Website: hkksiroki.com
Home	Away

Hrvatski košarkaški klub Široki (transl. Croat Basketball Club Široki), commonly referred to as HKK Široki or simply Široki, is a men's professional basketball club based in Široki Brijeg, Bosnia and Herzegovina. The team currently competes in the Basketball Championship of Bosnia and Herzegovina and the ABA League. With eleven Bosnia and Herzegovina Championship and nine Cups of Bosnia and Herzegovina won Široki is the most successful basketball team in the country.

== History ==
Former logo (until 2020).

Founded in 1974, the club became the basketball center in the south-west of SR Bosnia and Herzegovina but never played in the Yugoslavian elite league in the past.

First being registered under the name KK Mladost the club participated in lower leagues for years but had to stop its activities for two years in 1992 due to War in Bosnia. Afterwards the club was renamed HKK Široki and got a place in the newly established Bosnian national league and in 1998 took the double crown, in the national championship and in the national cup. Moving to the Pecara Sports Hall, with a capacity of 4,500 seats, the richest period in the club's history was still to come. Široki Hercegtisak received the invitation to the ABA League in the first years of its existence and was unbeatable in both domestic championships between 2002 and 2004. It was the club's decision to also participate in the FIBA European competitions for years, but as it is located in the Croatian part of the country the club became more orientated toward the neighboring country of Croatia after the war in the 90's.

== Home arena ==
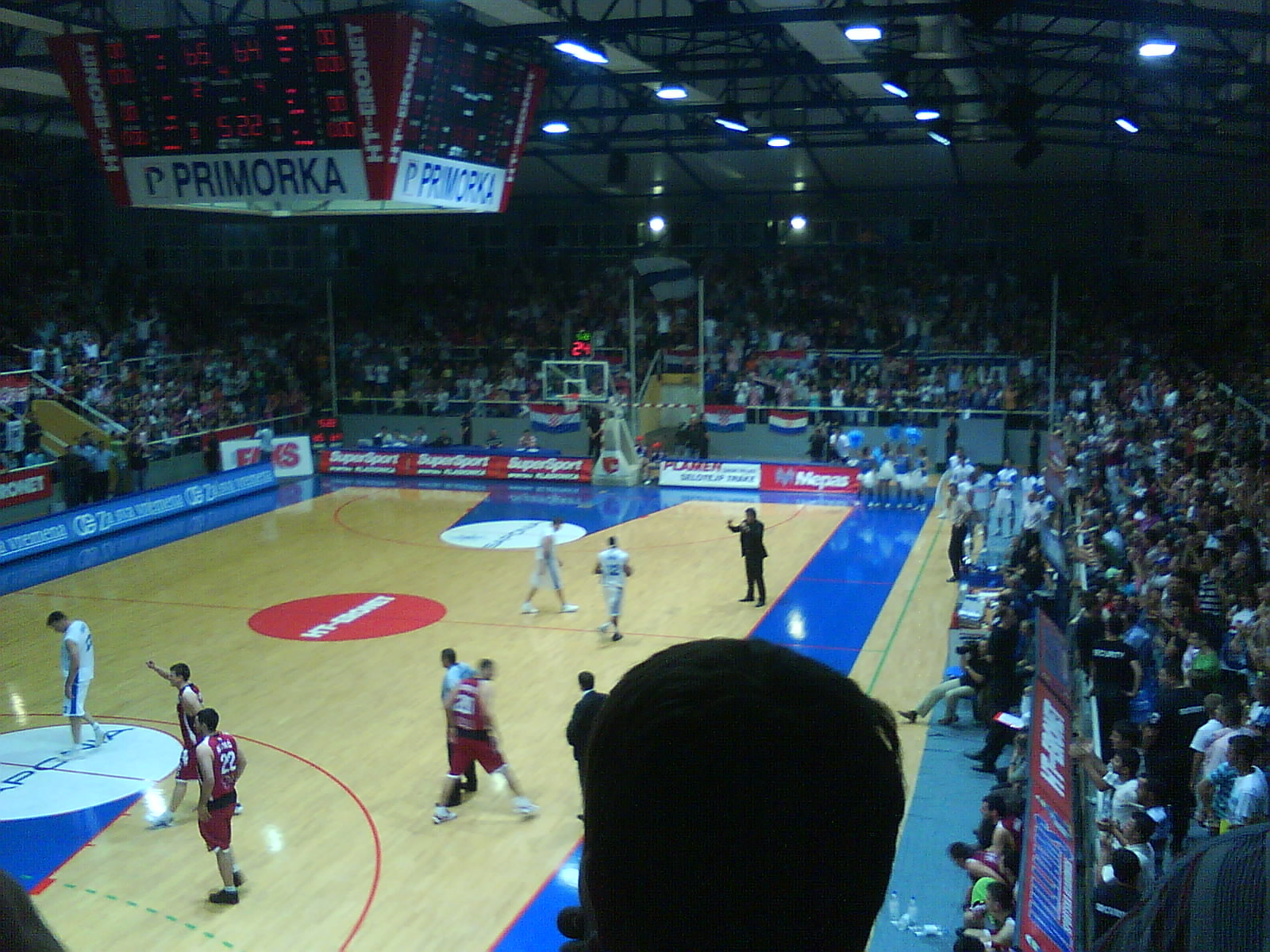
Široki at home arena in the final cup match against Bosna

Široki plays their home games at the Pecara Sports Hall. It has a seating capacity of 4,500.

== Sponsorship naming ==
The club has had several denominations through the years due to its sponsorship:

- Feal Široki (2001–2003)
- Široki Hercegtisak (2003–2004)
- Široki HT Eronet (2005–2008)
- Široki Prima pivo (2008–2009)
- Široki TT Kabeli (2009–2011)
- Široki WWin (2011–2012)
- Široki Primorka (2013–2014)

== Players ==
=== Current roster ===
Note: Flags indicate national team eligibility at FIBA-sanctioned events. Players may hold other non-FIBA nationalities not displayed.

HKK Široki roster
Players
Coaches

Pos.	No.	Nat.	Name	Ht.	Age
F	6	(Croatia)	Ivanov, Ive	2.00 m (6 ft 7 in)	40 – 13 November 1985
SG	8	(Croatia)	Kučan, Ivan	1.95 m (6 ft 5 in)	30 – 2 May 1996
PF	10	(Croatia)	Vucić, Mate	2.03 m (6 ft 8 in)	28 – 11 November 1997
PF	12	(Croatia)	Čolak, Mateo	2.06 m (6 ft 9 in)	28 – 24 April 1998
F	13	(Croatia)	Miletić, Nikola	1.97 m (6 ft 6 in)	22 – 28 June 2004
G	14	(United States)	Caruthers, Dontay	1.93 m (6 ft 4 in)	31 – 23 June 1995
SF	15	(Croatia)	Galić, Ivan	1.97 m (6 ft 6 in)	22 – 4 July 2004
SG	20	(Croatia)	Jelčić, Stanko	1.90 m (6 ft 3 in)	22 – 18 March 2004
C	21	(Bosnia and Herzegovina)	Čović, Mile	2.05 m (6 ft 9 in)	28 – 18 June 1998
SG	23	(Croatia)	Ćavar, Ivo	1.88 m (6 ft 2 in)	28 – 26 June 1998
F	24	(Croatia)	Zubac, Pero	2.01 m (6 ft 7 in)	21 – 7 February 2005
C	33	(Bosnia and Herzegovina)	Damjanović, Marko	2.13 m (7 ft 0 in)	27 – 30 November 1998
G	44	(Croatia)	Vujanović, Dominik	1.82 m (6 ft 0 in)	23 – 4 August 2003

Head coach

- (Croatia) Marijan Bagarić

Assistant coach(es)

- (Bosnia and Herzegovina) Ante Lončar

Strength & conditioning coach(es)

- (Bosnia and Herzegovina) Mile Galić

Physiotherapist(s)

- (Bosnia and Herzegovina) Tomislav Sesar

Legend

- (C) Team captain
- Injured

- Roster
Updated: February 25, 2022

== Trophies and awards ==
Honours		No.	Years
International competitions – 1
ABA League Second Division	Winners	1	2025–26
National competitions – 20
Bosnian League	Winners	10	2001–02, 2002–03, 2003–04, 2006–07, 2008–09, 2009–10, 2010–11, 2011–12, 2018–19, 2020–21
Bosnian Cup	Winners	8	2002, 2003, 2004, 2006, 2008, 2011, 2012, 2014
Competitions of Herzeg-Bosnia (2nd-tier) – 4
Herzeg-Bosnian League	Winners	3	1997–98, 2000–01, 2001–02
Herzeg-Bosnian Cup	Winners	1	1998–99

== Notable players ==
- (Croatia) Stipe Šarlija
- (Croatia) Darko Planinić
- (Croatia) Stanko Barać
- (Croatia) Fran Pilepić
- (Croatia) Željko Šakić
- (Croatia) Ivan Ramljak
- (Croatia) Gordan Zadravec
- (Croatia) Domagoj Bošnjak
- (Croatia) Josip Vranković
- (Croatia) Josip Sesar
- (Croatia) Ivan Buva
- (Croatia) Boris Barać
- (Croatia) Mladen Erjavec
- (Croatia) Davor Pejčinović
- (Croatia) Mateo Drežnjak
- (Croatia) Ivan Novačić
- (Croatia) Ivan Grgat
- (Croatia) Šime Špralja
- (Croatia) Martin Vanjak
- (Croatia) Josip Bilinovac
- (Bosnia and Herzegovina) Dalibor Peršić
- (Bosnia and Herzegovina) Marko Šutalo
- (Finland) Daniel Dolenc
- (United States) Richard Dumas
- (United States) Chester Mason
- (United States) Johnathon Jones

== See also ==
- KK Mladost
