= 1992–93 Phoenix Suns season =

Professional basketball season

- Conference champions
- Division champions
- Head coach: Paul Westphal
- General manager: Jerry Colangelo
- Owner: Jerry Colangelo
- Arena: America West Arena

Results
- Record: 62–20 (.756)
- Place: Division: 1st (Pacific); Conference: 1st (Western)
- Playoff finish: NBA Finals (lost to Bulls 2–4)
- Stats at Basketball Reference

Local media
- Television: KUTP; ASPN
- Radio: KTAR

Phoenix Suns 25th anniversary logo

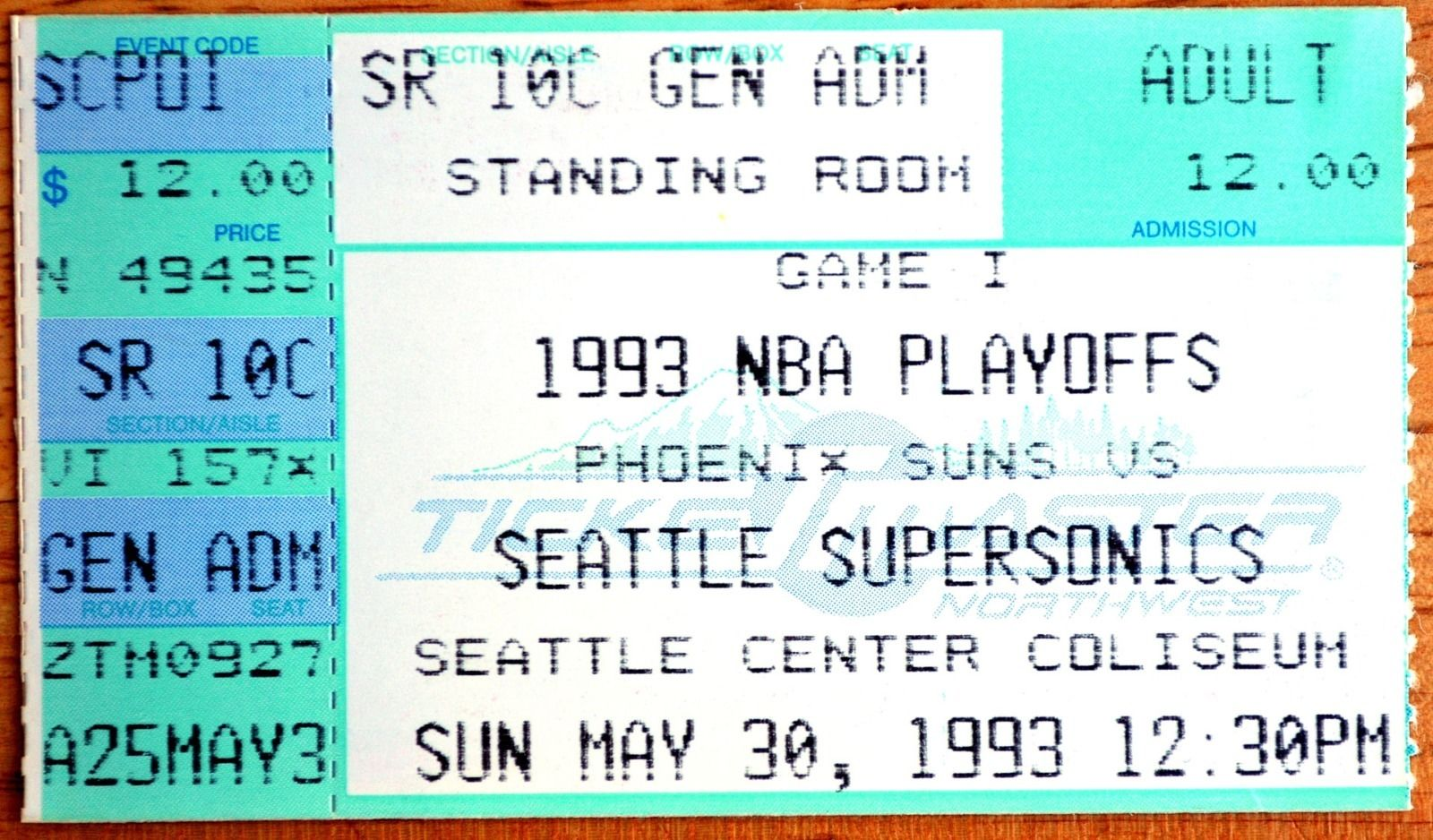
A ticket for Game 4 of the 1993 Western Conference finals between the Seattle SuperSonics and the Suns at the Seattle Center Coliseum

The 1992–93 Phoenix Suns season was the 25th season for the Phoenix Suns in the National Basketball Association.

== Season summary ==
=== Off-season ===
This season was most memorable for the Suns acquiring controversial All-Star power forward Charles Barkley from the Philadelphia 76ers, signing free agent Danny Ainge, and hiring Paul Westphal as their new head coach. This was also the team's first season playing at their new arena, the America West Arena, which had a seating capacity of 19,023.

For the season, the Suns redesigned their primary logo, replacing the color purple with a different shade of purple, black and light orange to their color scheme of orange and white. The team's primary logo featured an orange basketball as a light orange streaking sun in a purple box, above the city and team name in purple letters; the logo would be known as the "Streaking Sun" logo. The team also redesigned their home and road uniforms, which featured the team's primary logo of a streaking sun on the front of their jerseys, and side panels on the bottom of the left leg of their shorts. The white home uniforms featured a purple and orange trim, and purple side panels with an orange outline, while the purple road uniforms featured a black and orange trim, and black side panels with an orange outline.

The team's new primary logo, and new uniforms would both remain in use until 2000.

=== Regular season ===
Under Westphal, and with the addition of Barkley and Ainge, the Suns got off to a 7–4 start to the regular season, and then posted a 14-game winning streak in December; the team posted a 14–0 record that month, which led them to a 21–4 start to the season. The team posted a six-game winning streak in January, and later on held a 38–10 record at the All-Star break. The Suns posted an 11-game winning streak between March and April, and finished in first place in the Pacific Division with a league-best 62–20 record, earning the first seed in the Western Conference. The team set the franchise record for most wins in a season (the record was later tied in the 2004–05 season, and later broken in the 2021-22 NBA season); the Suns also qualified for the NBA playoffs for the fifth consecutive year.

Barkley averaged 25.6 points, 12.1 rebounds, 5.1 assists and 1.6 steals per game, and was named to the All-NBA First Team, and was named the NBA Most Valuable Player of the Year, while Dan Majerle averaged 16.9 points and 1.7 steals per game, finished tied in first place in the league with 167 three-point field goals, and was named to the NBA All-Defensive Second Team. In addition, point guard Kevin Johnson provided the team with 16.1 points, 7.8 assists and 1.7 steals per game, but only played just 49 games due to groin, hamstring and knee injuries, and rookie small forward Richard Dumas contributed 15.8 points and 1.8 steals per game, and was selected to the NBA All-Rookie Second Team, despite only playing just 48 games due to injury; Dumas was drafted by the Suns in the 1991 NBA draft, but was suspended for all of the previous season for violating the NBA's substance abuse policy.

Meanwhile, Cedric Ceballos provided with 12.8 points and 5.5 rebounds per game, and also led the league with .576 in field-goal percentage, while Tom Chambers played a sixth man role off the bench, averaging 12.2 points and 4.7 rebounds per game, and Ainge contributed 11.8 points per game and 150 three-point field goals, also off the bench. Negele Knight contributed 6.1 points per game, but only played 52 games due to injury, rookie center and first-round draft pick, Oliver Miller from the University of Arkansas, provided with 5.6 points, 4.9 rebounds and led the team with 1.8 blocks per game off the bench, and starting center Mark West averaged 5.3 points, 5.6 rebounds and 1.3 blocks per game.

During the NBA All-Star weekend at the Delta Center in Salt Lake City, Utah, Barkley and Majerle were both selected for the 1993 NBA All-Star Game, as members of the Western Conference All-Star team, while Westphal was selected to coach the Western Conference. In addition, Majerle also participated in the NBA Three-Point Shootout, while Ceballos participated in the NBA Slam Dunk Contest for the second consecutive year; Ceballos won the Slam Dunk Contest the previous year. Majerle finished tied in fifth place in Defensive Player of the Year voting, while Ceballos finished tied in eleventh place in Most Improved Player voting, Ainge finished tied in second place in Sixth Man of the Year voting, behind Clifford Robinson of the Portland Trail Blazers, and with Chambers finishing in fifth place, and Westphal finished in fourth place in Coach of the Year voting.

The Suns finished fifth in the NBA in home-game attendance, with an attendance of 779,943 at the America West Arena during the regular season; the team also sold-out all 41 of their home games during the season.

=== NBA playoffs ===
In the Western Conference First Round of the 1993 NBA playoffs, the Suns faced off against the 8th–seeded Los Angeles Lakers, a team that featured All-Star forward James Worthy, Sedale Threatt and Byron Scott. The Suns struggled losing the first two games to the Lakers at home, which included a Game 2 loss at the America West Arena, 86–81. Despite the threat of elimination, the Suns managed to win the next two games on the road, including a Game 4 win over the Lakers at the Great Western Forum, 101–86 to even the series. The Suns won Game 5 over the Lakers at the America West Arena in overtime, 112–104 to win in a hard-fought five-game series.

In the Western Conference Semi-finals, the team faced off against the 5th–seeded San Antonio Spurs, who were led by the trio of All-Star center David Robinson, All-Star forward Sean Elliott, and Dale Ellis. The Suns took a 2–0 series lead, but then lost the next two games to the Spurs on the road at the HemisFair Arena. After winning Game 5 at the America West Arena, 109–97, the Suns won Game 6 over the Spurs at the HemisFair Arena, 102–100, as Barkley hit a game-winning buzzer-beater to win the series in six games.

In the Western Conference Finals, the Suns then faced off against the 3rd–seeded Seattle SuperSonics, who were led by All-Star forward Shawn Kemp, Ricky Pierce and Gary Payton. The Suns took a 3–2 series lead before losing Game 6 to the SuperSonics on the road, 118–102 at the Seattle Center Coliseum. With the series tied at 3–3, the Suns won Game 7 over the SuperSonics at the America West Arena, 123–110, in which Barkley scored 44 points along with 24 rebounds; the Suns defeated the SuperSonics in a hard-fought seven-game series, and advanced to the NBA Finals for the second time in franchise history.

In the 1993 NBA Finals, the Suns faced off against the 2nd–seeded, and 2-time defending NBA champion Chicago Bulls, who were led by the trio of All-Star guard Michael Jordan, All-Star forward Scottie Pippen, and Horace Grant. The Suns lost the first two games to the Bulls at home at the America West Arena, but managed to win Game 3 on the road in triple-overtime, 129–121 at the Chicago Stadium. The Suns went on to lose the series to the Bulls in six games; in Game 6 at the America West Arena, Bulls reverse guard John Paxson hit a game-winning three-point shot as the Bulls defeated the Suns, 99–98 to win their third consecutive NBA championship.

=== Notable incidents ===
One notable incident of the regular season occurred on March 23, 1993, during a home game against the New York Knicks at the America West Arena. A brawl occurred when Johnson ran into Knicks guard Doc Rivers at the end of the first half; Rivers chased Johnson in retaliation, and Knicks guard Greg Anthony, who was dressed in street clothes because of a sprained ankle, came off the Knicks' bench and punched Johnson. Anthony was fined $20,500 and suspended for five games, while Johnson was fined $15,000 and suspended for two games, and Rivers was fined $10,000 and suspended for two games. The Suns defeated the Knicks by a score of 121–92.

=== Aftermath ===
Following the season, Chambers signed as a free agent with the Utah Jazz after five seasons with the Suns. This was the final season in which the Suns would advance to the NBA Finals until the 2020–21 season.

== Offseason ==
=== NBA draft ===
Round	Pick	Player	Position	Nationality	College
1	22	Oliver Miller	Center	United States	Arkansas
2	48	Brian Davis	Forward	United States	Duke
2	49	Ron Ellis	Forward	United States	Louisiana Tech

The Suns used their first-round pick to select center Oliver Miller from Arkansas. Miller averaged 12.2 points and 6.5 rebounds per game through four years with the Razorbacks. Miller would go on to play two seasons with the Suns before signing with the Detroit Pistons as a free agent in 1994. He would later return to the Suns in the 1999–2000 season. Second-round picks Brian Davis and Ron Ellis were not signed by the Suns. Davis would later play with the Minnesota Timberwolves in the 1993–94 season, while Ellis never played in the NBA.

=== Trades ===
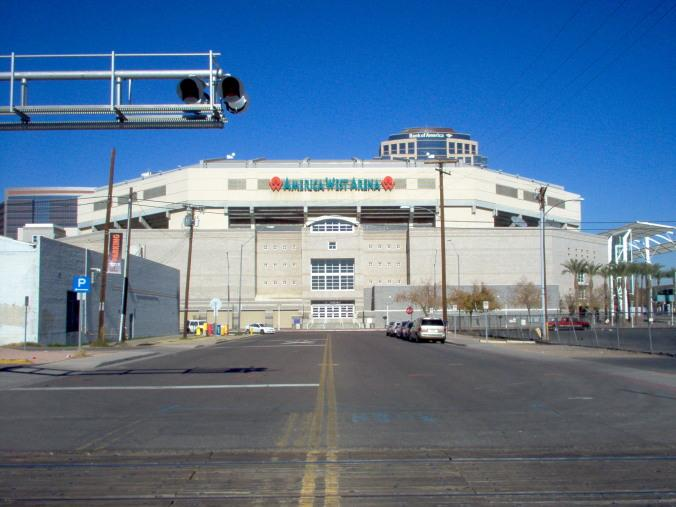
America West Arena

On June 17, 1992, the Suns traded former All-Star Jeff Hornacek, Tim Perry, and Andrew Lang to the Philadelphia 76ers for All-Star forward Charles Barkley. Barkley would play four seasons with the Suns before being traded to the Houston Rockets in 1996. Hornacek would play less than two seasons with the Sixers, Perry would play less than four, and Lang only one. Many consider the trade to be the best in Suns history.

=== Free agency ===
The Suns key off-season signing was veteran shooting guard Danny Ainge. Ainge would spend his last three seasons in the NBA with the Suns. Point guard Frank Johnson was signed to back-up All-Star Kevin Johnson. Forward/center Tim Kempton was signed, but played sparingly throughout the season. Small forward Alex Stivrins was picked up in the off-season, but later waived. He would return with two 10-day contracts later in the season, but was again waived.

== Roster ==
1992–93 Phoenix Suns roster
Players

Pos.	No.	Player	Height	Weight	DOB	From
G	22	Danny Ainge	6 ft 4 in (1.93 m)	175 lb (79 kg)	1959–03–17	BYU
F	34	Charles Barkley	6 ft 6 in (1.98 m)	252 lb (114 kg)	1963–02–20	Auburn
F	23	Cedric Ceballos	6 ft 6 in (1.98 m)	190 lb (86 kg)	1969–08–02	Cal State Fullerton
F	24	Tom Chambers	6 ft 10 in (2.08 m)	220 lb (100 kg)	1959–06–21	Utah
F	21	Richard Dumas	6 ft 7 in (2.01 m)	200 lb (91 kg)	1969–05–19	Oklahoma State
G	3	Frank Johnson	6 ft 1 in (1.85 m)	185 lb (84 kg)	1958–11–23	Wake Forest
G	7	Kevin Johnson	6 ft 1 in (1.85 m)	180 lb (82 kg)	1966–03–04	California
F	8	Tim Kempton	6 ft 10 in (2.08 m)	245 lb (111 kg)	1964–01–25	Notre Dame
G	32	Negele Knight	6 ft 1 in (1.85 m)	175 lb (79 kg)	1967–03–06	Dayton
G	9	Dan Majerle	6 ft 6 in (1.98 m)	215 lb (98 kg)	1965–09–09	Central Michigan
C	25	Oliver Miller	6 ft 9 in (2.06 m)	280 lb (127 kg)	1970–04–06	Arkansas
F	0	Jerrod Mustaf	6 ft 10 in (2.08 m)	238 lb (108 kg)	1969–10–28	Maryland
C	41	Mark West	6 ft 10 in (2.08 m)	230 lb (104 kg)	1960–11–05	Old Dominion

Coaches
Head coach
- Paul Westphal
Assistant(s)
- Lionel Hollins
- Scotty Robertson

Legend
- (DP) Unsigned draft pick
- (FA) Free agent
- (S) Suspended
- Injured

Roster
Updated: April 11, 1993

== Regular season ==
In 1992, the Suns moved into their new arena in downtown Phoenix, the America West Arena. The arena was not the only new arrival into Phoenix though, as all-star power forward Charles Barkley was traded from the Philadelphia 76ers for Jeff Hornacek, Andrew Lang, and Tim Perry. Barkley would go on to win his first and only MVP in his first year with Phoenix in 1993.

In addition to Barkley, the Suns added some key players to their roster, amongst them Danny Ainge. Also making his Suns debut was their 1991 first round draft pick, Oklahoma State forward Richard Dumas, who missed the previous season due to a drug-related suspension.

=== Season standings ===
Pacific Division	W	L	PCT	GB	Home	Road	Div
y-Phoenix Suns	62	20	.756	—	35–6	27–14	21–9
x-Seattle SuperSonics	55	27	.671	7	33–8	22–19	22–8
x-Portland Trail Blazers	51	31	.622	11	30–11	21–20	19–11
x-Los Angeles Clippers	41	41	.500	21	27–14	14–27	15–15
x-Los Angeles Lakers	39	43	.476	23	20–21	19–22	13–17
Golden State Warriors	34	48	.415	28	19–22	15–26	9–21
Sacramento Kings	25	57	.305	37	16–25	9–32	6–24

#	Western Conference				
#	Team	W	L	PCT	GB
1	z-Phoenix Suns	62	20	.756	–
2	y-Houston Rockets	55	27	.671	7
3	x-Seattle SuperSonics	55	27	.671	7
4	x-Portland Trail Blazers	51	31	.622	11
5	x-San Antonio Spurs	49	33	.598	13
6	x-Utah Jazz	47	35	.573	15
7	x-Los Angeles Clippers	41	41	.500	21
8	x-Los Angeles Lakers	39	43	.476	23
9	Denver Nuggets	36	46	.439	26
10	Golden State Warriors	34	48	.415	28
11	Sacramento Kings	25	57	.305	37
12	Minnesota Timberwolves	19	63	.232	43
13	Dallas Mavericks	11	71	.134	51

=== Game log ===
1992–93 game log
Total: 62–20 (home: 35–6; road: 27–14)
November: 7–4 (home: 5–1; road: 2–3)

Game	Date	Team	Score	High points	High rebounds	High assists	Location Attendance	Record
1	November 7	L.A. Clippers	W 111–105	Charles Barkley (37)	Charles Barkley (21)	Charles Barkley (8)	America West Arena; 19,023	1–0
2	November 10	@ Portland	L 89–100	Charles Barkley (21)	Charles Barkley (14)	Negele Knight (9)	Memorial Coliseum; 12,888	1–1
3	November 12, 1992; 7:00 p.m. MST	@ Utah	W 102–91	Barkley (25)	Barkley (14)	Barkley, Majerle (5)	Delta Center; 19,911	2–1
4	November 14	@ Minnesota	W 108–101	Tom Chambers (28)	Charles Barkley (13)	Dan Majerle (6)	Target Center; 19,006	3–1
5	November 16, 1992; 7:30 p.m. MST	Seattle	W 117–108	Barkley (28)	Barkley (12)	Knight (7)	America West Arena; 19,023	4–1
6	November 18	Sacramento	W 127–111	Cedric Ceballos (30)	Cedric Ceballos (13)	Oliver Miller, Alex Stivrins (5)	America West Arena; 19,023	5–1
7	November 21	@ L.A. Clippers	L 107–111	Charles Barkley (44)	Charles Barkley (17)	Kevin Johnson (7)	Los Angeles Memorial Sports Arena; 14,419	5–2
8	November 22, 1992; 7:00 p.m. MST	Chicago	L 111–128	Barkley (22)	Barkley (9)	K. Johnson (8)	America West Arena; 19,023	5–3
9	November 25	Portland	W 121–117	Charles Barkley (33)	Charles Barkley (18)	Charles Barkley (6)	America West Arena; 19,023	6–3
10	November 27	Golden State	W 121–107	Charles Barkley (29)	Charles Barkley (11)	Frank Johnson (9)	America West Arena; 19,023	7–3
11	November 28	@ Golden State	L 131–134	Charles Barkley (28)	Charles Barkley (18)	Dan Majerle (7)	Oakland–Alameda County Coliseum Arena; 15,025	7–4

December: 14–0 (home: 7–0; road: 7–0)

Game	Date	Team	Score	High points	High rebounds	High assists	Location Attendance	Record
12	December 1, 1992; 7:30 p.m. MST	Charlotte	W 109–90	Ceballos (20)	Barkley (14)	Barkley (7)	America West Arena; 19,023	8–4
13	December 4, 1992; 7:30 p.m. MST	L.A. Lakers	W 103–93	Barkley (19)	Barkley (9)	F. Johnson (5)	America West Arena; 19,023	9–4
14	December 6	@ Milwaukee	W 122–112	Negele Knight (22)	Charles Barkley (14)	Negele Knight (7)	Bradley Center; 16,646	10–4
15	December 8, 1992; 5:30 p.m. MST	@ New Jersey	W 105–100	Barkley (34)	Barkley (12)	Barkley (6)	Brendan Byrne Arena; 16,514	11–4
16	December 9, 1992; 5:30 p.m. MST	@ Charlotte	W 110–101	Barkley (23)	Barkley (12)	Barkley (10)	Charlotte Coliseum; 23,698	12–4
17	December 11	@ Orlando	W 108–107	Tom Chambers (27)	Charles Barkley (11)	Danny Ainge (9)	Orlando Arena; 15,151	13–4
18	December 12	@ Miami	W 122–118	Charles Barkley (39)	Charles Barkley (10)	Danny Ainge, Dan Majerle, Oliver Miller (5)	Miami Arena; 15,008	14–4
19	December 15	Washington	W 125–110	Charles Barkley (36)	Charles Barkley (10)	Dan Majerle (9)	America West Arena; 19,023	15–4
20	December 18, 1992; 8:30 p.m. MST	@ L.A. Lakers	W 116–100	Barkley (25)	Barkley (23)	Knight, Majerle (7)	Great Western Forum; 16,734	16–4
21	December 22	Golden State	W 106–104	Charles Barkley (35)	Charles Barkley (16)	Dan Majerle (5)	America West Arena; 19,023	17–4
22	December 23	@ Denver	W 111–96	Dan Majerle (25)	Cedric Ceballos (11)	Dan Majerle (5)	McNichols Sports Arena n/a	18–4
23	December 26, 1992; 7:30 p.m. MST	Seattle	W 113–110	Barkley (33)	Barkley (13)	Knight, Majerle (5)	America West Arena; 19,023	19–4
24	December 27	Denver	W 129–88	Richard Dumas (27)	Cedric Ceballos (12)	Kevin Johnson (12)	America West Arena; 19,023	20–4
25	December 30, 1992; 7:30 p.m. MST	Houston	W 133–110	Barkley, Ke=. Johnson, Majerle (25)	Barkley (17)	Barkley, K. Johnson (10)	America West Arena; 19,023	21–4

January: 10–4 (home: 3–0; road: 7–4)

Game	Date	Team	Score	High points	High rebounds	High assists	Location Attendance	Record
26	January 3, 1993; 6:00 p.m. MST	@ San Antonio	L 113–114 (OT)	Barkley (31)	Barkley (12)	K. Johnson (8)	HemisFair Arena; 16,057	21–5
27	January 5, 1993; 6:30 p.m. MST	@ Houston	W 106–104	Barkley (29)	Barkley (8)	Barkley (10)	The Summit; 13,755	22–5
28	January 7	@ Dallas	W 111–107	Charles Barkley (32)	Charles Barkley (14)	Charles Barkley, Dan Majerle (6)	Reunion Arena; 13,750	23–5
29	January 12, 1993; 8:00 p.m. MST	@ Seattle	L 113–122	Barkley (27)	Barkley (11)	K. Johnson (8)	Seattle Center Coliseum; 14,812	23–6
30	January 14	@ Sacramento	W 114–104	Richard Dumas, Dan Majerle (23)	Dan Majerle, Oliver Miller (9)	Kevin Johnson (8)	ARCO Arena; 17,317	24–6
31	January 15	Miami	W 107–99	Charles Barkley (31)	Charles Barkley (10)	Kevin Johnson, Dan Majerle (5)	America West Arena; 19,023	25–6
32	January 18, 1993; 11:00 a.m. MST	@ New York	L 103–106	Barkley (27)	Barkley (15)	K. Johnson (9)	Madison Square Garden; 19,763	25–7
33	January 20, 1993; 5:30 p.m. MST	@ Cleveland	L 119–123	Dumas (23)	West (12)	Ceballos (5)	Richfield Coliseum; 20,273	25–8
34	January 22	@ Washington	W 122–115	Richard Dumas (26)	Charles Barkley (9)	Charles Barkley (7)	Capital Centre; 18,756	26–8
35	January 23	@ Atlanta	W 110–91	Charles Barkley (32)	Charles Barkley (16)	Kevin Johnson (7)	Omni Coliseum; 16,531	27–8
36	January 25	@ Detroit	W 121–119	Charles Barkley, Kevin Johnson (24)	Richard Dumas (11)	Kevin Johnson (9)	The Palace of Auburn Hills; 21,454	28–8
37	January 27	@ Minnesota	W 117–116 (OT)	Charles Barkley (35)	Charles Barkley (24)	Kevin Johnson (7)	Target Center; 18,503	29–8
38	January 29, 1993; 6:00 p.m. MST	San Antonio	W 125–110	Ainge (26)	Barkley (11)	K. Johnson (11)	America West Arena; 19,023	30–8
39	January 30	Dallas	W 126–105	Dan Majerle (30)	Charles Barkley (14)	Kevin Johnson (7)	America West Arena; 19,023	31–8

February: 9–4 (home: 7–1; road: 2–3)

Game	Date	Team	Score	High points	High rebounds	High assists	Location Attendance	Record
40	February 2	@ L.A. Clippers	L 108–112	Kevin Johnson (23)	Mark West (12)	Charles Barkley, Kevin Johnson (6)	Los Angeles Memorial Sports Arena; 15,989	31–9
41	February 3	Minnesota	W 122–102	Danny Ainge (19)	Charles Barkley (14)	Kevin Johnson (8)	America West Arena; 19,023	32–9
42	February 5, 1993; 7:30 p.m. MST	L.A. Lakers	W 132–104	Majerle (29)	Dumas (9)	Barkley, K. Johnson (6)	America West Arena; 19,023	33–9
43	February 7	Orlando	W 121–105	Richard Dumas (31)	Charles Barkley (19)	Danny Ainge, Kevin Johnson (9)	America West Arena; 19,023	34–9
44	February 10	L.A. Clippers	W 122–100	Charles Barkley (22)	Charles Barkley (13)	Charles Barkley (8)	America West Arena; 19,023	35–9
45	February 11	@ Golden State	W 122–100	Danny Ainge (33)	Charles Barkley (19)	Kevin Johnson (12)	Oakland–Alameda County Coliseum Arena; 15,025	36–9
46	February 13, 1993; 8:00 p.m. MST	@ Seattle	L 94–95	Barkley (33)	Barkley (8)	Barkley (8)	Seattle Center Coliseum; 14,812	36–10
47	February 16	Boston	W 110–97	Charles Barkley (32)	Charles Barkley, Tom Chambers (12)	Charles Barkley (9)	America West Arena; 19,023	37–10
48	February 18	Atlanta	W 131–119	Richard Dumas (32)	Charles Barkley (16)	Charles Barkley (12)	America West Arena; 19,023	38–10
All-Star Break
49	February 23, 1993; 6:30 p.m. MST	@ San Antonio	W 105–103	Barkley (29)	Barkley (12)	Ainge (7)	HemisFair Arena; 16,057	39–10
50	February 25, 1993; 6:30 p.m. MST	@ Houston	L 104–131	Dumas (21)	Barkley, Dumas (8)	Ainge, Barkley, Knight (4)	The Summit; 16,611	39–11
51	February 26, 1993; 7:30 p.m. MST	Utah	W 113–106	Barkley (29)	Barkley (11)	Barkley (11)	America West Arena; 19,023	40–11
52	February 28, 1993; 1:30 p.m. MST	Cleveland	L 94–101	Barkley (27)	Barkley (19)	Barkley (11)	America West Arena; 19,023	40–12

March: 13–3 (home: 8–2; road: 5–1)

Game	Date	Team	Score	High points	High rebounds	High assists	Location Attendance	Record
53	March 2	@ Portland	L 97–102	Charles Barkley, Dan Majerle (20)	Charles Barkley (12)	Dan Majerle (7)	Memorial Coliseum; 12,888	40–13
54	March 3	Philadelphia	W 125–115	Charles Barkley (36)	Charles Barkley (17)	Charles Barkley (9)	America West Arena; 19,023	41–13
55	March 5	Sacramento	W 130–122	Charles Barkley (32)	Mark West (12)	Kevin Johnson (6)	America West Arena; 19,023	42–13
56	March 6	@ Dallas	W 109–102	Kevin Johnson (28)	Charles Barkley (15)	Kevin Johnson (7)	Reunion Arena; 17,502	43–13
57	March 9	@ Sacramento	W 128–108	Cedric Ceballos (40)	Cedric Ceballos (12)	Kevin Johnson (12)	ARCO Arena; 17,317	44–13
58	March 10	Golden State	W 111–100	Charles Barkley (30)	Mark West (13)	Kevin Johnson (8)	America West Arena; 19,023	45–13
59	March 12	Dallas	W 116–98	Cedric Ceballos (24)	Charles Barkley, Cedric Ceballos (9)	Kevin Johnson (9)	America West Arena; 19,023	46–13
60	March 13, 1993; 7:30 p.m. MST	New Jersey	L 93–124	K. Johnson (23)	Ceballos, Chambers, Mustaf (7)	K. Johnson (6)	America West Arena; 19,023	46–14
61	March 17	Portland	W 129–111	Cedric Ceballos, Tom Chambers (24)	Cedric Ceballos (14)	Kevin Johnson (14)	America West Arena; 19,023	47–14
62	March 19	Detroit	W 127–97	Danny Ainge (23)	Charles Barkley (16)	Dan Majerle (9)	America West Arena; 19,023	48–14
63	March 21	Indiana	L 108–109	Charles Barkley (38)	Charles Barkley, Mark West (9)	Kevin Johnson (11)	America West Arena; 19,023	48–15
64	March 23, 1993; 6:30 p.m. MST	New York	W 121–92	Barkley (31)	Ceballos (12)	F. Johnson (7)	America West Arena; 19,023	49–15
65	March 24, 1993; 8:30 p.m. MST	@ L.A. Lakers	W 120–105	Barkley (33)	Barkley (12)	Barkley (8)	Great Western Forum; 17,505	50–15
66	March 26	Milwaukee	W 109–103	Charles Barkley (31)	Charles Barkley (15)	Frank Johnson (8)	America West Arena; 19,023	51–15
67	March 28	@ Philadelphia	W 110–100	Charles Barkley (35)	Cedric Ceballos (15)	Kevin Johnson (8)	The Spectrum; 18,168	52–15
68	March 30, 1993; 6:00 p.m. MST	@ Chicago	W 113–109	Ceballos (27)	West (10)	K. Johnson (16)	Chicago Stadium; 18,676	53–15

April: 9–5 (home: 5–2; road: 4–3)

Game	Date	Team	Score	High points	High rebounds	High assists	Location Attendance	Record
69	April 2	@ Boston	W 118–114	Charles Barkley (37)	Charles Barkley (11)	Kevin Johnson (9)	Boston Garden; 14,890	54–15
70	April 4	@ Indiana	W 110–100	Charles Barkley (32)	Charles Barkley (13)	Kevin Johnson (8)	Market Square Arena; 16,530	55–15
71	April 6, 1993; 7:30 p.m. MST	L.A. Lakers	W 115–114	K. Johnson (32)	Barkley (11)	Majerle (8)	America West Arena; 19,023	56–15
72	April 8	@ Sacramento	W 123–114	Cedric Ceballos (28)	Mark West (13)	Kevin Johnson (7)	ARCO Arena	57–15
73	April 9	Denver	W 98–97	Charles Barkley (26)	Charles Barkley (19)	Charles Barkley (12)	America West Arena; 19,023	58–15
74	April 11, 1993; 12:30 p.m. MST	Utah	W 112–99	K. Johnson (29)	Barkley (7)	K. Johnson (9)	America West Arena; 19,023	59–15
75	April 12	@ L.A. Clippers	L 104–111	Richard Dumas (28)	Richard Dumas (12)	Danny Ainge, Dan Majerle (6)	Los Angeles Memorial Sports Arena; 15,989	59–16
76	April 14	Minnesota	W 98–84	Dan Majerle (25)	Cedric Ceballos (13)	Kevin Johnson (10)	America West Arena; 19,023	60–16
77	April 16, 1993; 6:30 p.m. MST	Seattle	L 102–108	Ceballos (21)	Chambers, Mustaf (7)	K. Johnson, Majerle (7)	America West Arena; 19,023	60–17
78	April 17, 1993; 6:00 p.m. MST	@ Utah	L 101–110	Ceballos (25)	Ceballos (10)	Knight (6)	Delta Center; 19,911	60–18
79	April 19, 1993; 7:30 p.m. MST	Houston	L 97–111	K. Johnson (18)	Mustaf (8)	K. Johnson (7)	America West Arena; 19,023	60–19
80	April 22	@ Portland	W 115–114	Charles Barkley (25)	Cedric Ceballos (9)	Kevin Johnson (14)	Memorial Coliseum; 12,888	61–19
81	April 24, 1993; 12:30 p.m. MST	San Antonio	W 99–97	Dumas (23)	Ceballos (11)	Ainge, F. Johnson, Knight (6)	America West Arena; 19,023	62–19
82	April 25	@ Denver	L 118–120	Richard Dumas (25)	Charles Barkley (10)	Danny Ainge (7)	McNichols Sports Arena; 17,022	62–20

1992–93 schedule

== Playoffs ==
Under rookie head coach Paul Westphal (a former Suns assistant and, as a player, member of the 1976 Suns squad that went to the NBA Finals), the Suns squad consisting mostly of Barkley, Majerle, Johnson and Ainge won 62 games that year. After eliminating the Lakers (against whom they came back from an 0–2 deficit preventing them from being the first eight-seeded team to eliminate the top seeded team in the first round), Spurs, and Sonics, the Suns advanced to the Finals for the second time in franchise history. They eventually lost to the Bulls, led by Michael Jordan and Scottie Pippen. This series included a triple-overtime game (Game 3) that along with game 5 of the 1976 series are the only triple overtime games in the history of the NBA finals. Approximately 300,000 fans braved the 105 degree heat to celebrate the memorable season in the streets of Phoenix.

=== Game log ===
1993 playoff game log
Western Conference First Round: 3–2 (home: 1–2; road: 2–0)

Game	Date	Team	Score	High points	High rebounds	High assists	Location Attendance	Series
1	April 30, 1993; 7:30 p.m. MST	L.A. Lakers	L 103–107	Barkley (34)	Barkley (15)	Knight, Majerle (5)	America West Arena; 19,023	0–1
2	May 2, 1993; 12 Noon MST	L.A. Lakers	L 81–86	Barkley, Chambers, Dumas (18)	Barkley (21)	K. Johnson (16)	America West Arena; 19,023	0–2
3	May 4, 1993; 7:30 p.m. MST	@ L.A. Lakers	W 107–102	Barkley (27)	Barkley (11)	Barkley, K. Johnson, Majerle (5)	Great Western Forum; 17,505	1–2
4	May 6, 1993; 7:30 p.m. MST	@ L.A. Lakers	W 101–86	Barkley (28)	Barkley (11)	K. Johnson (6)	Great Western Forum; 17,505	2–2
5	May 9, 1993; 2:30 p.m. MST	L.A. Lakers	W 112–104 (OT)	Barkley (31)	Barkley, Miller (14)	K. Johnson (13)	America West Arena; 19,023	3–2

Western Conference Semifinals: 4–2 (home: 3–0; road: 1–2)

Game	Date	Team	Score	High points	High rebounds	High assists	Location Attendance	Series
1	May 11, 1993; 7:30 p.m. MST	San Antonio	W 98–89	K. Johnson (25)	Barkley (10)	K. Johnson (7)	America West Arena; 19,023	1–0
2	May 13, 1993; 7:30 p.m. MST	San Antonio	W 109–103	Barkley (35)	Barkley (10)	K. Johnson (12)	America West Arena; 19,023	2–0
3	May 15, 1993; 10:00 a.m. MST	@ San Antonio	L 96–111	K. Johnson (26)	Barkley (14)	K. Johnson (7)	HemisFair Arena; 16,057	2–1
4	May 16, 1993; 12:30 p.m. MST	@ San Antonio	L 103–117	K. Johnson (26)	Barkley (12)	K. Johnson (8)	HemisFair Arena; 16,057	2–2
5	May 18, 1993; 7:30 p.m. MST	San Antonio	W 109–97	Barkley (36)	Barkley (12)	K. Johnson (12)	America West Arena; 19,023	3–2
6	May 20, 1993; 4:00 p.m. MST	@ San Antonio	W 102–100	Barkley (28)	Barkley (21)	K. Johnson (8)	HemisFair Arena; 16,057	4–2

Western Conference Finals: 4–3 (home: 3–1; road: 1–2)

Game	Date	Team	Score	High points	High rebounds	High assists	Location Attendance	Series
1	May 24, 1993; 6:00 p.m. MST	Seattle	W 105–91	Ceballos (21)	Barkley (14)	Majerle (9)	America West Arena; 19,023	1–0
2	May 26, 1993; 6:00 p.m. MST	Seattle	L 99–103	Majerle (29)	Barkley, Majerle (10)	Barkley (6)	America West Arena; 19,023	1–1
3	May 28, 1993; 6:00 p.m. MST	@ Seattle	W 104–97	K. Johnson (20)	Barkley (16)	K. Johnson (9)	Seattle Center Coliseum; 14,812	2–1
4	May 30, 1993; 12:30 p.m. MST	@ Seattle	L 101–120	Barkley (27)	Barkley (7)	K. Johnson (7)	Seattle Center Coliseum; 14,812	2–2
5	June 1, 1993; 6:00 p.m. MST	Seattle	W 120–114	Barkley (43)	Barkley (15)	Barkley, K. Johnson (10)	America West Arena; 19,023	3–2
6	June 3, 1993; 6:00 p.m. MST	@ Seattle	L 102–118	K. Johnson (22)	Barkley (11)	K. Johnson (4)	Seattle Center Coliseum; 14,812	3–3
7	June 5, 1993; 12:30 p.m. MST	Seattle	W 123–110	Barkley (44)	Barkley (24)	K. Johnson (9)	America West Arena; 19,023	4–3

NBA Finals: 2–4 (home: 0–3; road: 2–1)

Game	Date	Team	Score	High points	High rebounds	High assists	Location Attendance	Series
1	June 9, 1993; 6:00 p.m. MST	Chicago	L 92–100	Barkley (21)	Dumas (12)	Barkley (5)	America West Arena; 19,023	0–1
2	June 11, 1993; 6:00 p.m. MST	Chicago	L 108–111	Barkley (42)	Barkley (13)	K. Johnson (6)	America West Arena; 19,023	0–2
3	June 13, 1993; 4:00 p.m. MST	@ Chicago	W 129–121 (3OT)	Majerle (28)	Barkley (19)	K. Johnson (9)	Chicago Stadium; 18,676	1–2
4	June 16, 1993; 6:00 p.m. MST	@ Chicago	L 105–111	Barkley (32)	Barkley (12)	Barkley (10)	Chicago Stadium; 18,676	1–3
5	June 18, 1993; 6:00 p.m. MST	@ Chicago	W 108–98	Dumas, K. Johnson (25)	Majerle (12)	K. Johnson (8)	Chicago Stadium; 18,676	2–3
6	June 20, 1993; 4:00 p.m. MST	Chicago	L 98–99	Barkley, Majerle (21)	Barkley (17)	K. Johnson (10)	America West Arena; 19,023	2–4

1993 schedule

== NBA Finals ==
The 1993 NBA Finals was the championship round of the 1992–93 NBA season, featuring the Chicago Bulls, led by Michael Jordan, and the Phoenix Suns, winners of 62 games and led by regular season MVP Charles Barkley. The Bulls became the first team since the legendary Boston Celtics of the 1960s to win three consecutive championship titles, clinching the "three-peat" with John Paxson's game-winning 3-pointer that gave them a 99–98 victory in Game 6.

- The Phoenix Suns won game 3 in 3OT, 129–121. Suns Head Coach Paul Westphal became the only person to appear in both triple-overtime finals games. The first was Game 5 of the 1976 contest against Boston, as a player for the Suns, which thus were the only team to appear in two triple-overtime finals games. In 1976, the Suns lost 126–128 against Boston.
- The Bulls got off to a good start in Game 6 but struggled in the fourth quarter, wasting a double-digit lead to trail 98–94. Michael Jordan made a layup to cut the margin to 2 points, and the Suns missed a shot on their next possession. Trailing 98–96 and facing a Game 7 on the road if they lost that day, John Paxson took a pass from Horace Grant and buried a three pointer with 3.9 seconds left, giving the Bulls a 99–98 lead. The victory was secured by a last-second block from Horace Grant.
- Michael Jordan, who averaged a Finals-record 41.0 PPG during the six-game series, became the first player in NBA history to win three straight Bill Russell NBA Finals Most Valuable Player Awards. He joined Magic Johnson as the only other player to win the award three times. The NBA started awarding the Finals MVP in 1969.

== Awards and honors ==
=== Week/Month ===
- Charles Barkley was named Player of the Week for games played December 7 through December 13.
- Charles Barkley was named Player of the Week for games played March 29 through April 4.
- Charles Barkley was named Player of the Month for December.
- Paul Westphal was named Coach of the Month for December.

=== All-Star ===
- Charles Barkley was voted as a starter for the Western Conference in the All-Star Game. It was his seventh All-Star selection. Barkley finished third in All-Star voting with 858,947 votes, behind only Michael Jordan (1,035,824) and Scottie Pippen (932,912).
- Dan Majerle was selected as a reserve for the Western Conference in the All-Star Game. It was his second All-Star selection.
- The other Suns player who received All-Star votes was Kevin Johnson (188,545).
- Paul Westphal coached the Western Conference All-Star team to a 135–130 victory over the East.
- Cedric Ceballos participated in the Slam Dunk Contest. After winning the 1992 contest, Ceballos made the final round, finishing third behind Clarence Weatherspoon and champion Harold Miner.
- Dan Majerle participated in the Three-Point Shootout, losing to champion Mark Price.

=== Season ===
- Charles Barkley received the Most Valuable Player Award.
- Jerry Colangelo received the Executive of the Year Award.
- Charles Barkley was named to the All-NBA First Team.
- Dan Majerle was named to the NBA All-Defensive Second Team. Majerle also finished fifth in Defensive Player of the Year voting.
- Richard Dumas was named to the NBA All-Rookie Second Team.
- Cedric Ceballos led the league in field goal percentage, making 57.6 percent of his shots.
- Dan Majerle led the league (tied with Reggie Miller) in three-point field goals with 167.
- Danny Ainge finished tied in second in Sixth Man of the Year voting.
- Tom Chambers finished fifth in Sixth Man of the Year voting.

== Player statistics ==
Legend
GP	Games played	GS	Games started	MPG	Minutes per game
FG%	Field-goal percentage	3P%	3-point field-goal percentage	FT%	Free-throw percentage
RPG	Rebounds per game	APG	Assists per game	SPG	Steals per game
BPG	Blocks per game	PPG	Points per game

=== Season ===
Player	GP	GS	MPG	FG%	3P%	FT%	RPG	APG	SPG	BPG	PPG
Danny Ainge	80	0	27.0	.462	.403	.848	2.7	3.3	0.9	0.1	11.8
Charles Barkley	76	76	37.6	.520	.305	.765	12.2	5.1	1.6	1.0	25.6
Cedric Ceballos	74	46	21.7	.576†	.000	.725	5.5	1.0	0.7	0.4	12.8
Tom Chambers	73	0	23.6	.447	.393	.837	4.7	1.4	0.6	0.3	12.2
Richard Dumas	48	32	27.5	.524	.333	.707	4.6	1.3	1.8	0.8	15.8
Frank Johnson	77	0	14.6	.436	.083	.776	1.5	2.4	0.8	0.1	4.3
Kevin Johnson	49	47	33.5	.499	.125	.819	2.1	7.8	1.7	0.4	16.1
Tim Kempton	30	0	5.6	.396	.	.581	1.3	0.6	0.1	0.1	1.9
Negele Knight	52	35	17.1	.391	.000	.779	1.2	2.8	0.4	0.1	6.1
Dan Majerle	82	82	39.0	.464	.381	.778	4.7	3.8	1.7	0.4	16.9
Oliver Miller	56	1	19.1	.475	.000	.710	4.9	2.1	0.7	1.8	5.6
Jerrod Mustaf	32	9	10.5	.438	.000	.623	2.6	0.3	0.5	0.3	4.6
Kurt Rambis*	5	0	8.2	.571	.	.500	1.2	0.2	0.6	0.0	1.8
Alex Stivrins*	10	0	3.5	.611	.000	.	0.8	0.1	0.1	0.1	2.2
Mark West	82	82	19.0	.614†	.	.518	5.6	0.4	0.2	1.3	5.3

* – Stats with the Suns.
† – Minimum 300 field goals made.

=== Playoffs ===
Player	GP	GS	MPG	FG%	3P%	FT%	RPG	APG	SPG	BPG	PPG
Danny Ainge	24	0	24.6	.376	.413	.872	2.5	2.3	0.5	0.1	8.1
Charles Barkley	24	24	42.8	.477	.222	.771	13.6	4.3	1.6	1.0	26.6
Cedric Ceballos	16	3	11.6	.571	.	.727	2.3	0.8	0.3	0.4	6.0
Tom Chambers	24	1	15.7	.388	.400	.815	2.7	0.5	0.2	0.4	7.3
Richard Dumas	23	20	21.7	.525	.000	.755	2.8	1.0	0.9	0.6	10.9
Frank Johnson	22	0	7.8	.440	.333	.862	0.5	0.8	0.3	0.0	3.2
Kevin Johnson	23	23	39.7	.480	.000	.795	2.7	7.9	1.5	0.6	17.8
Negele Knight	9	1	3.8	.563	.	.	0.3	0.8	0.0	0.1	2.0
Dan Majerle	24	24	44.6	.431	.394	.696	5.8	3.7	1.4	1.2	15.4
Oliver Miller	24	0	21.4	.587†	.000	.564	5.2	2.1	0.9	2.5	7.2
Jerrod Mustaf	7	0	1.4	.600†	.	.	0.3	0.0	0.0	0.1	0.9
Mark West	24	24	19.5	.544	.	.609	4.1	0.5	0.2	1.4	4.8

† – Minimum 20 field goals made. Player statistics citation:

== Transactions ==
=== Trades ===
June 17, 1992
To Philadelphia 76ers

(United States) Jeff Hornacek
(United States) Tim Perry
(United States) Andrew Lang

To Phoenix Suns

(United States) Charles Barkley

=== Free agents ===
==== Additions ====
Date	Player	Signed	Former Team
July 3, 1992	Danny Ainge	Signed 3-year contract for $5.2 million	Portland Trail Blazers
August 18, 1992	Tim Kempton	Signed multi-year contract	Denver Nuggets
September 29, 1992	Alex Stivrins	Undisclosed	Seattle SuperSonics
October 8, 1992	Frank Johnson	Undisclosed	Orlando Magic
November 5, 1992	Frank Johnson	Signed one-year contract for $140,000	Phoenix Suns
March 31, 1993	Alex Stivrins	Signed two 10-day contracts	Milwaukee Bucks

==== Subtractions ====
Date	Player	Reason left	New team
June 17, 1992	Steve Burtt	Waived	Washington Bullets
September 24, 1992	Chad Gallagher	Released	Utah Jazz
October 22, 1992	Brad Davis	Waived	Minnesota Timberwolves
November 3, 1992	Frank Johnson	Waived	Phoenix Suns
November 5, 1992	Ed Nealy	Waived	Golden State Warriors
November 20, 1992	Kurt Rambis	Waived	Sacramento Kings
December 28, 1992	Alex Stivrins	Waived	Atlanta Hawks
April 11, 1993	Alex Stivrins	Waived	Omaha Racers

Player Transactions Citation:
