= FK Jedinstvo =

FK Jedinstvo or NK Jedinstvo may refer to a number of association football clubs based in the former Yugoslavia. "Jedinstvo" is the Serbo-Croatian word for "unity", while FK and NK are two variants of the Serbo-Croatian abbreviation for "FC", standing for "football club" (i.e. fudbalski klub or nogometni klub).

Thus, the term may refer to:

- FK Jedinstvo Bačko Petrovo Selo, Serbian football club based in Bačko Petrovo Selo
- NK Jedinstvo Bihać, Bosnian football club based in Bihać, active since 1919
- FK Jedinstvo Bijelo Polje, Montenegrin football club based in Bijelo Polje, active since 1922
- FK Jedinstvo Bošnjace, Serbian football club based in Bošnjace
- FK Jedinstvo Brčko, Bosnian football club based in Brčko, active since 1919
- FK Jedinstvo Brodac, Bosnian football club based in Brodac, active since 1930
- FK Jedinstvo Crkvina, Bosnian football club based in Crkvina
- FK Jedinstvo Donja Mutnica, Serbian football club based in Donja Mutnica
- FK Jedinstvo Kačarevo, Serbian football club based in Kačarevo
- FK Jedinstvo Mali Zvornik, Serbian football club based in Mali Zvornik, active since 1967
- FK Jedinstvo Morović, Serbian football club based in Morović
- FK Jedinstvo Novi Bečej, Serbian football club based in Novi Bečej
- FK Jedinstvo Paraćin, Serbian football club based in Paraćin, active since 1925
- FK Jedinstvo Pirot, Serbian football club based in Pirot
- FK Jedinstvo Ruma, Serbian football club based in Ruma
- FK Jedinstvo Stara Pazova, Serbian football club based in Stara Pazova
- FK Jedinstvo Surčin, Serbian football club based in Surčin, active since 1928
- FK Jedinstvo Ub, Serbian football club based in Ub, active since 1920
- FK Jedinstvo Užice, Serbian football club based in Užice, active since 1961
- FK Jedinstvo Vladimirci, Serbian football club based in Vladimirci
- FK Jedinstvo Žeravica, Bosnian football club based in Žeravica

== See also ==
- FK Mladost (disambiguation)
