= Richard Dumas =

American basketball player (born 1969)

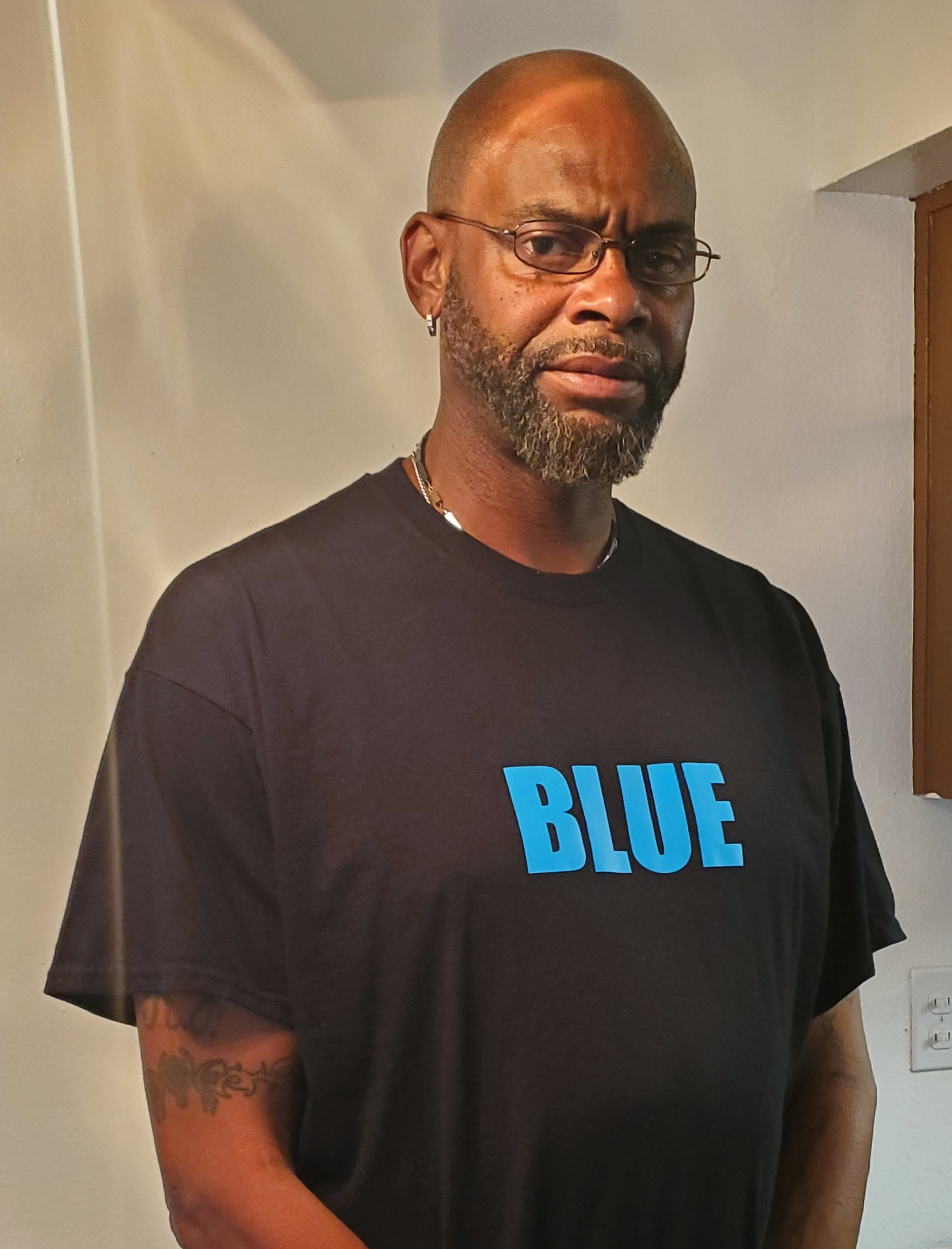
- Dumas in 2020

Personal information
- Born: May 19, 1969 (age 57) Tulsa, Oklahoma, U.S.
- Listed height: 6 ft 7 in (2.01 m)
- Listed weight: 234 lb (106 kg)

Career information
- High school: Booker T. Washington (Tulsa, Oklahoma)
- College: Oklahoma State (1987–1990)
- NBA draft: 1991: 2nd round, 46th overall pick
- Drafted by: Phoenix Suns
- Playing career: 1990–2003
- Position: Small forward
- Number: 21, 12, 7

Career history
- 1990–1991: Hapoel Holon
- 1991–1992: Oklahoma City Cavalry
- 1992: Treasure Coast Tropics
- 1992–1993, 1995: Phoenix Suns
- 1995–1996: Philadelphia 76ers
- 1997: Atléticos de San Germán
- 1997–1998: Montpellier
- 1998–1999: Znicz Pruszków
- 1999: New Hampshire Thunder Loons
- 1999–2000: HKK Široki
- 2000: Derby Storm
- 2000: Fargo-Moorhead Bees
- 2001: Oklahoma Storm
- 2001–2002: Wilmington Wave Rockers
- 2002–2003: Frontier City River Dogz
- 2003: Westchester Wildfire

Career highlights
- NBA All-Rookie Second Team (1993); Third-team Parade All-American (1987)

Career NBA statistics
- Points: 1,080 (10.6 ppg)
- Rebounds: 351 (3.4 rpg)
- Assists: 111 (1.3 apg)
- Stats at NBA.com
- Stats at Basketball Reference

Richard Wayne Dumas Jr. (born May 19, 1969) is an American former professional basketball player. Born in Tulsa, Oklahoma, he is the son of former American Basketball Association (ABA) player Rich Dumas.

== Basketball career ==
Dumas, a 6' 7" small forward from Oklahoma State University, was selected with the 46th pick of the 1991 NBA draft by the Phoenix Suns. Just before the start of the 1991–92 season, however, Dumas was suspended from the NBA for violating its substance abuse policy. Dumas played in Israel for Hapoel Holon during his suspension. His rookie campaign commenced 19 games into the Suns' stellar 1992–93 season, averaging 15.8 points and 4.6 rebounds per game while helping the team to a league-best 62 wins and an NBA Finals appearance. Because of his performance during his first season in the NBA, Dumas received NBA All-Rookie Second Team honors.

Following a stint in rehab, he returned in 1995 to the Phoenix Suns, averaging just 5.5 points in 15 games in his final season with that team. Under the influence of head coach John Lucas, Dumas averaged 6.2 points in 39 games for the Philadelphia 76ers. After the season, Dumas violated his contractual terms regarding use of alcohol and due to his previous substance abuse violations and suspensions, this infraction led to his permanent banning from the NBA with no possibility of return.

He then continued his professional career overseas, playing for Gymnastikos S. Larissas in Greece, Pekaes Pruszków (1998–99) in Poland, as well as for the Westchester Wildfire of the United States Basketball League.

Dumas retired from basketball in 2003.

== NBA player statistics ==
Legend
GP	Games played	GS	Games started	MPG	Minutes per game
FG%	Field goal percentage	3P%	3-point field goal percentage	FT%	Free throw percentage
RPG	Rebounds per game	APG	Assists per game	SPG	Steals per game
BPG	Blocks per game	PPG	Points per game	**Bold**	Career high

=== Regular season ===
Year	Team	GP	GS	MPG	FG%	3P%	FT%	RPG	APG	SPG	BPG	PPG
1992–93	Phoenix	**48**	**32**	**27.5**	**.524**	**.333**	**.707**	**4.6**	**1.3**	**1.8**	**0.8**	**15.8**
1994–95	Phoenix	15	1	11.1	.507	.000	.500	1.9	0.5	0.7	0.1	5.5
1995–96	Philadelphia	39	14	18.9	.468	.222	.700	2.5	1.1	1.1	0.2	6.2
Career		102	47	21.8	.509	.231	.694	3.4	1.1	1.3	0.5	10.6

=== Playoffs ===
Year	Team	GP	GS	MPG	FG%	3P%	FT%	RPG	APG	SPG	BPG	PPG
1993	Phoenix	**23**	**20**	**21.7**	**.525**	.000	**.755**	**2.8**	**1.0**	**0.9**	**0.6**	**10.9**
1995	Phoenix	3	0	1.7	.250	—	—	0.3	0.0	0.0	0.0	0.7
Career		26	20	19.4	.519	.000	.755	2.5	0.9	0.8	0.5	9.4

== Personal life ==
Dumas was arrested by federal agents December 19, 2013, on eight felony charges of alleged Organized Retail Theft. He was taken into federal custody at his Dumas Youth Sports Club in Litchfield Park, Arizona. Dumas was one of 151 people taken into custody by the Federal Marshal's Service. His trial was scheduled for September 15, 2014. On December 11, 2014, Dumas pleaded guilty to theft. On January 20, 2015, he was sentenced under a plea agreement with prosecutors to three years of probation. According to the Associated Press, "Authorities say Dumas stole about $800 worth of merchandise from a Luke Air Force Base store while working with a janitorial service. They say Dumas was seen on surveillance cameras taking cigarettes, alcohol, food, DVDs and shoes."

== See also ==
- List of second-generation NBA players
