= FK Mladost =

FK Mladost may refer to a number of association football clubs based in the former Yugoslavia. "Mladost" means "youth" in Macedonian and Serbo-Croatian, while FK is a local abbreviation for "FC", standing for "football club" (i.e. fudbalski klub).

Thus, the term may refer to:

In Bosnia and Herzegovina

- FK Mladost Doboj Kakanj
- FK Mladost Gacko
- FK Mladost Lončari
- FK Mladost Velika Obarska

In Macedonia

- FK Mladost Carev Dvor
- FK Mladost Krivogaštani
- FK Mladost Udovo

In Montenegro

- OFK Mladost Lješkopolje
- FK Mladost Podgorica

In Serbia

- FK Mladost Apatin
- FK Mladost Bački Jarak
- FK Mladost Lučani
- FK Mladost Novi Sad

== See also ==
- Mladost (disambiguation)
- FK Jedinstvo (disambiguation)
- FK Radnički (disambiguation)
