= Alex Stivrins =

Latvian-American basketball player

Personal information
- Born: November 29, 1962 (age 63) Lincoln, Nebraska, U.S.
- Listed height: 6 ft 8 in (2.03 m)
- Listed weight: 220 lb (100 kg)

Career information
- High school: Lincoln East (Lincoln, Nebraska)
- College: Creighton (1980–1982); Colorado (1983–1985)
- NBA draft: 1985: 4th round, 75th overall pick
- Drafted by: Seattle SuperSonics
- Playing career: 1985–1997
- Position: Small forward
- Number: 42, 11, 25, 43

Career history
- 1985: Seattle SuperSonics
- 1985–1986: Wyoming Wildcatters
- 1986–1987: Avignon
- 1987: Tenerife
- 1989–1990: Canarias
- 1990: Aurora Desio
- 1990–1991: Omaha Racers
- 1991: Aurora Desio
- 1991–1992: Cercom Ferrara
- 1992: Phoenix Suns
- 1993: Atlanta Hawks
- 1993: Los Angeles Clippers
- 1993: Milwaukee Bucks
- 1993: Phoenix Suns
- 1993: Omaha Racers
- 1993–1994: Breogán
- 1996–1997: Japan Energy Griffins

Career highlights
- CBA champion (1993)
- Stats at NBA.com
- Stats at Basketball Reference

Alex Frank Stivrins (Latvian: Alekss Frenks Stivriņš; born November 29, 1962) is an American former professional basketball player. He was a 6-foot-8-inch (203 cm), 220-pound (100 kg) small forward. Stivrins graduated from Lincoln East High School in 1980 and led East to three state basketball tournament appearances, where they won the state championship in 1978, qualified for state in 1979 and finished runner-up in 1980 in Class A, which is Nebraska's largest classification for high school athletics. He was a two-time Super State and All-Nebraska selection his junior and senior years. He played collegiately at Creighton University and the University of Colorado from 1980 to 1985. He continued his career in the NBA.

Stivrins was selected by the Seattle SuperSonics with the 75th overall pick in the 4th round of the 1985 NBA draft. He played with the SuperSonics, Phoenix Suns, Los Angeles Clippers, Milwaukee Bucks and Atlanta Hawks.

Stivrins won a Continental Basketball Association (CBA) championship with the Omaha Racers in 1993.

His father, ophthalmologist Dr. Kazimirs Stivriņš (1921–2008), a native of Izvalta in Latgale, Latvia fled the second Soviet occupation of Latvia to the United States after the Second World War. Stivrins is considered to be the first ethnic Latvian (and Latgalian) player in the NBA and played a game in 1992 against the first ever Latvian-born NBA player, Gundars Vētra.

== Career statistics ==
Legend
GP	Games played	GS	Games started	MPG	Minutes per game
FG%	Field goal percentage	3P%	3-point field goal percentage	FT%	Free throw percentage
RPG	Rebounds per game	APG	Assists per game	SPG	Steals per game
BPG	Blocks per game	PPG	Points per game	**Bold**	Career high

=== NBA ===
==== Regular season ====
Year	Team	GP	GS	MPG	FG%	3P%	FT%	RPG	APG	SPG	BPG	PPG
1985–86	Seattle	3	0	4.7	.250	–	.250	1.0	.3	.0	.0	1.0
1992–93	Phoenix	**10**	0	3.5	**.611**	.000	–	.8	.1	.1	.1	2.2
1992–93	L.A. Clippers	1	0	1.0	.000	–	–	.0	.0	.0	.0	.0
1992–93	Milwaukee	3	0	**8.3**	.364	–	**.750**	**2.0**	**.7**	**.3**	.0	**3.7**
1992–93	Atlanta	5	0	3.0	.444	.000	–	1.0	.0	.0	**.2**	1.6
Career		22	0	4.1	.465	.000	.500	1.0	.2	.1	.1	2.0
