= Jerrod Mustaf =

American basketball player (1969–2024)

Personal information
- Born: October 28, 1969 Whiteville, North Carolina, U.S.
- Died: October 28, 2024 (aged 55) Mint Hill, North Carolina, U.S.
- Listed height: 6 ft 10 in (2.08 m)
- Listed weight: 238 lb (108 kg)

Career information
- High school: DeMatha Catholic (Hyattsville, Maryland)
- College: Maryland (1988–1990)
- NBA draft: 1990: 1st round, 17th overall pick
- Drafted by: New York Knicks
- Playing career: 1990–2001
- Position: Power forward / center
- Number: 32, 0

Career history
- 1990–1991: New York Knicks
- 1991–1994: Phoenix Suns
- 1994–1995: P.A.O.K. Thessaloniki
- 1995: Festina Andorra
- 1996: Strasbourg IG
- 1996–1998: FC Barcelona
- 1998–1999: Paris Basket Racing
- 1999–2001: Prokom Trefl Sopot
- 2001: Egepen Altay

Career highlights
- Third-team All-ACC (1990); McDonald's All-American (1988); Second-team Parade All-American (1988); Third-team Parade All-American (1987); Fourth-team Parade All-American (1986)

Career NBA statistics
- Points: 721 (4.0 ppg)
- Rebounds: 452 (2.5 rpg)
- Stats at NBA.com
- Stats at Basketball Reference

Terrah Jerrod Mustaf (October 28, 1969 – October 28, 2024) was an American professional basketball player. In high school, he was a three-time Parade All-American. He participated in the Capital Classic and McDonald's All-American Game. Mustaf played four seasons in the National Basketball Association (NBA), after being drafted 17th in the 1990 NBA draft. After his girlfriend was murdered, Mustaf came under suspicion when his cousin was convicted of the crime. Mustaf later left the United States to play professionally in Europe. After returning to the United States, Mustaf committed himself to charitable causes for youth in Maryland.

== Early life ==
Mustaf was born in Whiteville, North Carolina where he was raised by his mother Lilly Mae George. At age 14, Jerrod Mustaf moved to Maryland to live with his father, activist Shaar Mustaf. Jerrod Mustaf's father, a self-described "black militant" would have a significant impact on his life, encouraging him to be a community leader and activist. Mustaf went on to play basketball at DeMatha High School in Hyattsville, Maryland. He was one of the most heavily recruited players in his senior year.

== Basketball career ==
With his father's urging, went on to play collegiately for the Maryland Terrapins. While at Maryland, Mustaf played in 59 games, averaging 16.6 points. During the 1989–90 NCAA Division I season, he scored 609 points across 33 games.

After two seasons at Maryland, Mustaf entered the 1990 NBA draft.

Mustaf was selected by the New York Knicks as the 17th overall pick in the first round of the draft. He would play intermittently in the NBA from 1990 to 1994 with the Knicks and the Phoenix Suns. He additionally played three days for the Seattle SuperSonics, after which he played professionally in Europe. He also signed with the Charlotte Hornets in 1996 briefly before being waived.

He retired in 2001, last playing with Altay Kartal Makarna of the Turkish Basketball League.

== Murder of Althea Hayes ==
While Mustaf was playing for the Phoenix Suns, on July 22, 1993, his alleged girlfriend Althea Hayes was found shot to death in her apartment in Glendale, Arizona. Hayes, age 27, was reportedly pregnant with Mustaf's child at the time of her murder. Multiple witnesses reported that Mustaf was not happy about the pregnancy and had asked Hayes to have an abortion, but Hayes refused. Mustaf denied the allegations. On the night Hayes was murdered, she phoned a friend and told them that Mustaf's cousin, Lavonnie Wooten, was in her apartment and that she was frightened of him. An off-duty police officer reported seeing both Mustaf and Wooten in the apartment complex where Hayes lived on the night she died. Wooten was later arrested, convicted of the murder, and sentenced to life in prison in 1996.

Mustaf was never charged with Hayes's murder and strongly denied wrongdoing, claiming that Hayes was not his girlfriend and that he had been convicted without a trial. The Phoenix Suns placed Mustaf on the injured list to address the charges, later releasing him in 1994. Mustaf continued to be a person of interest in the murder investigation. In 1995 the family of Althea Hayes later filed a civil wrongful death lawsuit against Mustaf. Mustaf settled the lawsuit out of court for an undisclosed amount.

In 2017, K.C. Scull, the lead homicide investigator for the Hayes case, stated to Sports Illustrated that "I think, even today, if the U.S. Attorney's office would take this case on, it could be won." The same article had Wooten claiming to be the innocent victim of a conspiracy, and that the DA's office made offers to him for a reduced sentence if he would incriminate Mustaf in Hayes' murder, which Wooten refused to do. With Mustaf's death, the DA's office permanently closed the case, and Wooten is likely to stay behind bars for life.

== Later life and death ==
After Hayes' murder, Mustaf continued to play professionally in Greece, Spain, and France. He returned to Maryland in the 2000s. In 2001, he was charged with assault for attacking his then partner Shalamar Muhammad Mustaf, and later violating a protective order related to the case.

=== Activism ===
In Maryland, Mustaf led the Take Charge program, a non-profit founded by his father designed to keep vulnerable teens out of the criminal justice system. He would continue to work with at risk youth and run basketball camps for the remainder of his life.

In 2006, he was nominated Sports Ambassador of Gambia where he advocated for greater support for the development of basketball in the country. In 2008, he was hired as the Director of Athletic Development at Laurinburg Institute. Mustaf later became CEO and president of the Street Basketball Association based in Mitchellville, Maryland.

=== Death ===
Mustaf died in Mint Hill, North Carolina on October 28, 2024, on his 55th birthday.

== Career statistics ==
Legend
GP	Games played	GS	Games started	MPG	Minutes per game
FG%	Field goal percentage	3P%	3-point field goal percentage	FT%	Free throw percentage
RPG	Rebounds per game	APG	Assists per game	SPG	Steals per game
BPG	Blocks per game	PPG	Points per game	**Bold**	Career high

=== NBA ===
==== Regular season ====
Year	Team	GP	GS	MPG	FG%	3P%	FT%	RPG	APG	SPG	BPG	PPG
1990–91	New York	**62**	5	**13.3**	.465	.000	.644	2.7	.6	.2	.2	4.3
1991–92	Phoenix	52	3	10.5	**.477**	–	**.690**	**2.8**	**.9**	**.4**	**.3**	4.5
1992–93	Phoenix	32	**9**	10.5	.438	.000	.623	2.6	.3	**.4**	**.3**	**4.6**
1993–94	Phoenix	33	2	5.9	.357	–	.591	1.7	.2	.1	.2	2.2
Career		179	19	10.6	.449	.000	.648	2.5	.6	.3	.3	4.0

==== Playoffs ====
Year	Team	GP	GS	MPG	FG%	3P%	FT%	RPG	APG	SPG	BPG	PPG
1991	New York	3	0	**7.3**	**.800**	–	**.800**	**1.7**	.0	.0	**.3**	**4.0**
1993	Phoenix	**7**	0	1.4	.600	–	–	.3	.0	.0	.1	.9
Career		10	0	3.2	.700	–	.800	.7	.0	.0	.2	1.8
