= All-USBL Team =

American basketball award

The All-USBL Team was an annual United States Basketball League (USBL) honor bestowed on the best players in the league following every USBL season. The team has been selected in every season of the league's existence, dating back to its inaugural season in 1985. The All-USBL Team had two teams composed of two five-man lineups: a first, and a second team.

Many former NBA players like Roy Tarpley, World B. Free, Muggsy Bogues, Manute Bol and have won the USBL honors.

== Selections ==
=== All-USBL First Team ===
1985

- (Sudan) (United States) Manute Bol, Rhode Island Gulls
- (United States) Kenny Orange, Long Island Knights
- (United States) John "Hot Rod" Williams, Rhode Island Gulls
- (United States) Lowes Moore, Westchester Golden Apples
- (United States) Tracy Jackson, Springfield Fame

1986

- (United States) Jim Lampley, Wildwood Aces
- (United States) Don Collins, Tampa Bay Flash
- (United States) John "Hot Rod" Williams (2), Staten Island Stallions
- (Canada) Stewart Granger, Wildwood Aces
- (United States) Billy Goodwin, Springfield Fame

1987

- (United States) Eddie Lee Wilkins, Staten Island Stallions
- (United States) Don Collins (2), Tampa Bay Stars
- (United States) Richard Rellford, West Palm Beach Stingrays
- (United States) Muggsy Bogues, Rhode Island Gulls
- (United States) World B. Free, Miami Tropics

1988

- (United States) (France) Michael Brooks, Philadelphia Aces
- (United States) Norris Coleman, Jacksonville Hooters
- (United States) Mike Jones, Jersey Shore Bucs
- (United States) Lewis Lloyd, Philadelphia Aces
- (United States) Andre Turner, Miami Tropics

1990

- (United States) Alex Roberts, New York Whitecaps
- (United States) Lewis Lloyd (2), Philadelphia Aces
- (United States) Randy Henry, Jacksonville Hooters
- (United States) Jerry Johnson, Jacksonville Hooters
- (United States) Terrance Allen, Palm Beach Stingrays

1991

- (United States) Earl Cureton, New Haven Skyhawks
- (United States) Norris Coleman (2), Jacksonville Hooters
- (United States) Anthony Mason, Long Island Surf
- (United States) Michael Anderson, Philadelphia Spirit
- (United States) Wes Matthews, Atlanta Eagles

1992

- (United States) Roy Tarpley, Miami Tropics
- (United States) Reggie Cross, Palm Beach Stingrays
- (United States) Richard Dumas, Miami Tropics
- (United States) Jay Edwards, New Haven Skyhawks
- (United States) Duane Washington, Miami Tropics

1993

- (United States) Darrell Armstrong, Atlanta Eagles
- (United States) (Israel) Mark Brisker, Daytona Beach Hooters
- (United States) Khari Jaxon, Palm Beach Stingrays
- (United States) Ken Bannister, Miami Tropics
- (United States) Fred Lewis, Daytona Beach Hooters

1994

- (United States) Darrell Armstrong (2), Atlanta Trojans
- (United States) (Israel) Mark Brisker, Jacksonville Hooters
- (United States) Greg Dennis, Mississippi Coast Gamblers
- (United States) Stan Rose, Atlanta Trojans
- (United States) Kannard Johnson, Jacksonville Hooters

1995

- (United States) Charles Smith, Florida Sharks
- (United States) Jerry Reynolds, Atlanta Trojans
- (United States) Brent Scott, Miami Tropics
- (United States) Travis Williams, Florida Sharks
- (United States) Frazier Johnson, Long Island Surf

1996

- (United States) Charles Smith (2), Florida Sharks
- (United States) Greg Grant, Atlantic City Seagulls
- (United States) Brent Scott (2), Portland Mountain Cats
- (United States) Tom Kleinschmidt, Florida Sharks
- (United States) Corey Williams, Long Island Surf

1997

- (United States) Herman Alston, Westchester Kings
- (United States) Dennis Edwards, Florida Sharks
- (United States) Brent Scott (3), Atlantic City Seagulls
- (United States) Tim Moore, Jacksonville Barracudas
- (United States) John Strickland, Long Island Surf

1998

- (United States) Curt Smith, Washington Congressionals
- (United States) Mike Lloyd, Atlantic City Seagulls
- (United States) John Strickland (2), Long Island Surf
- (United States) Adrian Griffin, Atlantic City Seagulls
- (United States) Tyrone Hopkins, Raleigh Cougars

1999

- (United States) Mike Lloyd (2), Atlantic City Seagulls
- (United States) Junie Sanders, Brooklyn Kings
- (United States) Adrian Griffin (2), Atlantic City Seagulls
- (United States) Andre Perry, Atlanta Trojans
- (United States) Jermaine Walker, Gulf Coast SunDogs

2000

- (United States) Sean Colson, Dodge City Legend
- (United States) Kwan Johnson, Pennsylvania ValleyDawgs
- (United States) Ace Custis, Pennsylvania ValleyDawgs
- (United States) Darrin Hancock, Dodge City Legend
- (United States) Mark Blount, New Jersey Shorecats

2001

- (United States) Aubrey Reese, Oklahoma Storm
- (United States) Jermaine Jackson, Kansas Cagerz
- (United States) George Evans, Maryland Mustangs
- (United States) Andre Perry (2), Florida Sea Dragons
- (United States) Jermaine Walker (2), Lakeland Blue Ducks

2002

- (United States) Greg Jones, St. Joseph Express
- (United States) Kwan Johnson (2), Brevard Blue Ducks
- (United States) Johnny Jackson, Kansas Cagerz
- (United States) Ira Clark, Oklahoma Storm
- (United States) Kenny Gregory, Dodge City Legend

2003

- (United States) Kareem Reid, Pennsylvania ValleyDawgs
- (United States) Albert Mouring, Oklahoma Storm
- (United States) Ace Custis, Pennsylvania ValleyDawgs
- (United States) Darrin Hancock, Dodge City Legend
- (United States) Johnny Jackson (2), Kansas Cagerz

2004

- (United States) Jason Lampa, Brooklyn Kings
- (United States) Jimmie Hunter, Adirondack Wildcats
- (United States) Immanuel McElroy, Dodge City Legend
- (United States) Patrick Okafor, Oklahoma Storm
- (United States) B.J. McFarlan, Brooklyn Kings

2005

- (United States) (Nigeria) Ebi Ere, Oklahoma Storm
- (United States) Anthony Glover, Brooklyn Kings
- (United States) B.J. McFarlan, Brooklyn Kings
- (United States) Nate Johnson (b.1979), Kansas Cagerz
- (United States) Jermaine Boyette, Dodge City Legend

2006

- (United States) Renaldo Major, Dodge City Legend
- (United States) Jason Smith, Nebraska Cranes
- (United States) Anthony Johnson, Kansas Cagerz
- (United States) Brian Chase, Nebraska Cranes
- (United States) Quannas White, Oklahoma Storm

2007

- (United States) Jamario Moon, Gary Steelheads
- (United States) Anthony Richardson, Kansas Cagerz
- (United States) Chris Sockwell, Dodge City Legend
- (United States) Jason Lampa, Brooklyn Kings
- (United States) Ronald Ross, Albany Patroons

=== All-USBL Second Team ===
1985

- (United States) Jim Bostic, Westchester Golden Apples
- (United States) Larry Lawrence, Springfield Fame
- (United States) Joe Dawson, Connecticut Colonials
- (United States) Michael Adams, Springfield Fame
- (United States) Derrick Rowland, New Jersey Jammers

1986

- (United States) Jerome Henderson, Springfield Fame
- (United States) Ronnie Valentine, Tampa Bay Flash
- (United States) Greg Wendt, Gold Coast Stingrays
- (United States) Michael Adams (2), Springfield Fame

1987

- (United States) Hank McDowell, Rhode Island Gulls
- (United States) (France) Michael Brooks, Philadelphia Aces
- (United States) Norris Coleman, Tampa Bay Stars
- (United States) Clinton Wheeler, Miami Tropics

1988

- (United States) Darryl Middleton, Long Island Knights
- (United States) Richard Rellford, Palm Beach Stingrays
- (United States) Cedric Henderson, Jacksonville Hooters
- (United States) Bobby Parks, New Haven Skyhawks
- (United States) Mitchell Wiggins, Jacksonville Hooters

1990

- (United States) Ken McClary, Palm Beach Stingrays
- (United States) John Bailey, Palm Beach Stingrays
- (United States) Damari Riddick, New Haven Skyhawks
- (United States) Shaun McDaniels, New Haven Skyhawks
- (United States) Danny Pearson, Jacksonville Hooters

1991

- (United States) Tony Costner, Philadelphia Spirit
- (United States) Dallas Comegys, Philadelphia Spirit
- (United States) Nate Johnston, Suncoast Sunblasters
- (United States) Paul Graham, Philadelphia Spirit
- (United States) Tharon Mayes, New Haven Skyhawks

1992

- (United States) Derrall Dumas, Jacksonville Hooters
- (United States) Kenny Miller, New Jersey Jammers
- (United States) Anthony Pullard, New Haven Skyhawks
- (United States) Michael Anderson, Philadelphia Spirit
- (United States) Darrell Armstrong, Atlanta Eagles
- (United States) Lloyd Daniels, Long Island Surf

1993

- (United States) Elmer Anderson, Westchester Stallions
- (United States) Luther Burks, Miami Tropics
- (United States) Cliff Robinson, Miami Tropics
- (United States) Sebastian Neal, Westchester Stallions
- (United States) Stan Rose, Atlanta Eagles

1994

- (United States) Jean Prioleau, Long Island Surf
- (United States) Anderson Hunt, Miami Tropics
- (United States) Keith Lee, Memphis Fire
- (United States) Kermit Holmes, Westchester Stallions
- (United States) Joe Harvell, Memphis Fire

1995

- (United States) Derrick Canada, Connecticut Skyhawks
- (United States) Steve Worthy, Jersey Turnpikes
- (United States) (Republic of Ireland) Dan O’Sullivan, Jersey Turnpikes
- (United States) Sylvester Gray, Florida Sharks
- (United States) Herman Alston, Long Island Surf

1996

- (United States) Kevin Ollie, Connecticut Skyhawks
- (United States) Sean Green, Portland Mountain Cats
- (United States) Mark Strickland, Atlantic City Seagulls
- (United States) Ron Anderson, Atlantic City Seagulls
- (United States) Mike Hackett, Jacksonville Barracudas

1997

- (United States) Jerry McCullough, New Hampshire Thunder Loons
- (United States) LaMark Baker, Atlantic City Seagulls
- (United States) Kevin Ollie, Connecticut Skyhawks
- (United States) Donzell Rush, Tampa Bay Windjammers
- (United States) Ochiel Swaby, Tampa Bay Windjammers

1998

- (United States) Seth Marshall, Connecticut Skyhawks
- (United States) Silas Mills, Long Island Surf
- (Nigeria) Tunji Awojobi, New Jersey Shorecats
- (United States) Ochiel Swaby, Tampa Bay Windjammers
- (United States) Andre Perry, Atlanta Trojans

1999

- (United States) Rasaun Young, Connecticut Skyhawks
- (United States) Curt Smith, Connecticut Skyhawks
- (United States) Ray Hairston, Kansas Cagerz
- (United States) Ace Custis, Pennsylvania ValleyDawgs
- (United States) George Banks, Tampa Bay Windjammers

2000

- (United States) Artie Griffin, Dodge City Legend
- (United States) Bryant Basemore, Kansas Cagerz
- (United States) Andre Perry, Florida Sun Dogs
- (United States) Willie Burton, Oklahoma Storm
- (United States) Raphael Edwards, Atlantic City Seagulls

2001

- (United States) Kareem Reid, Pennsylvania ValleyDawgs
- (United States) Dominick Young, Kansas Cagerz
- (United States) Kelvin Price, Dodge City Legend
- (United States) Gregory Springfield, Brooklyn Kings
- (United States) Johnny Jackson, Kansas Cagerz

2002

- (United States) Todd Myles, Brooklyn Kings
- (United States) Cory Hightower, Pennsylvania ValleyDawgs
- (United States) Fred House, Adirondack Wildcats
- (United States) Gary Williams, Kansas Cagerz
- (United States) Oliver Miller, Dodge City Legend

2003

- (United States) Lenny Cooke, Brooklyn Kings
- (United States) (Haiti) Olden Polynice, Pennsylvania ValleyDawgs
- (United States) Kevin Freeman, Westchester Wildfire
- (United States) Lee Benson, Kansas Cagerz
- (United States) Antonio Smith, Dodge City Legend

2004

- (United States) Lamont Turner, Oklahoma Storm
- (United States) Tyson Patterson, Florence Flyers
- (United States) Jermaine Boyette, Adirondack Wildcats
- (United States) Mike Campbell, Brooklyn Kings
- (United States) (Republic of Ireland) Bryan Bracey, Cedar Rapids River Raiders

2005

- (United States) Renaldo Major, Dodge City Legend
- (United States) Mike Mackell, Oklahoma Storm
- (United States) Roderick Riley, Pennsylvania ValleyDawgs
- (United States) Larry House, Nebraska Cranes
- (United States) Joe Adkins, Oklahoma Storm

2006

- (United States) Anthony Glover, Brooklyn Kings
- (United States) Terrance Johnson, Oklahoma Storm
- (United States) Alex Sanders, Nebraska Cranes
- (United States) Chris Sandy, Brooklyn Kings
- (United States) Nate Johnson (b.1979), Kansas Cagerz

2007

- (United States) Brian Lubeck, Dodge City Legend
- (United States) Cory Hightower, Albany Patroons
- (United States) Marcus Campbell, Kansas Cagerz
- (United States) Kareem Reid (2), Albany Patroons
- (United States) Anthony Johnson, Kansas Cagerz

== Most selections ==
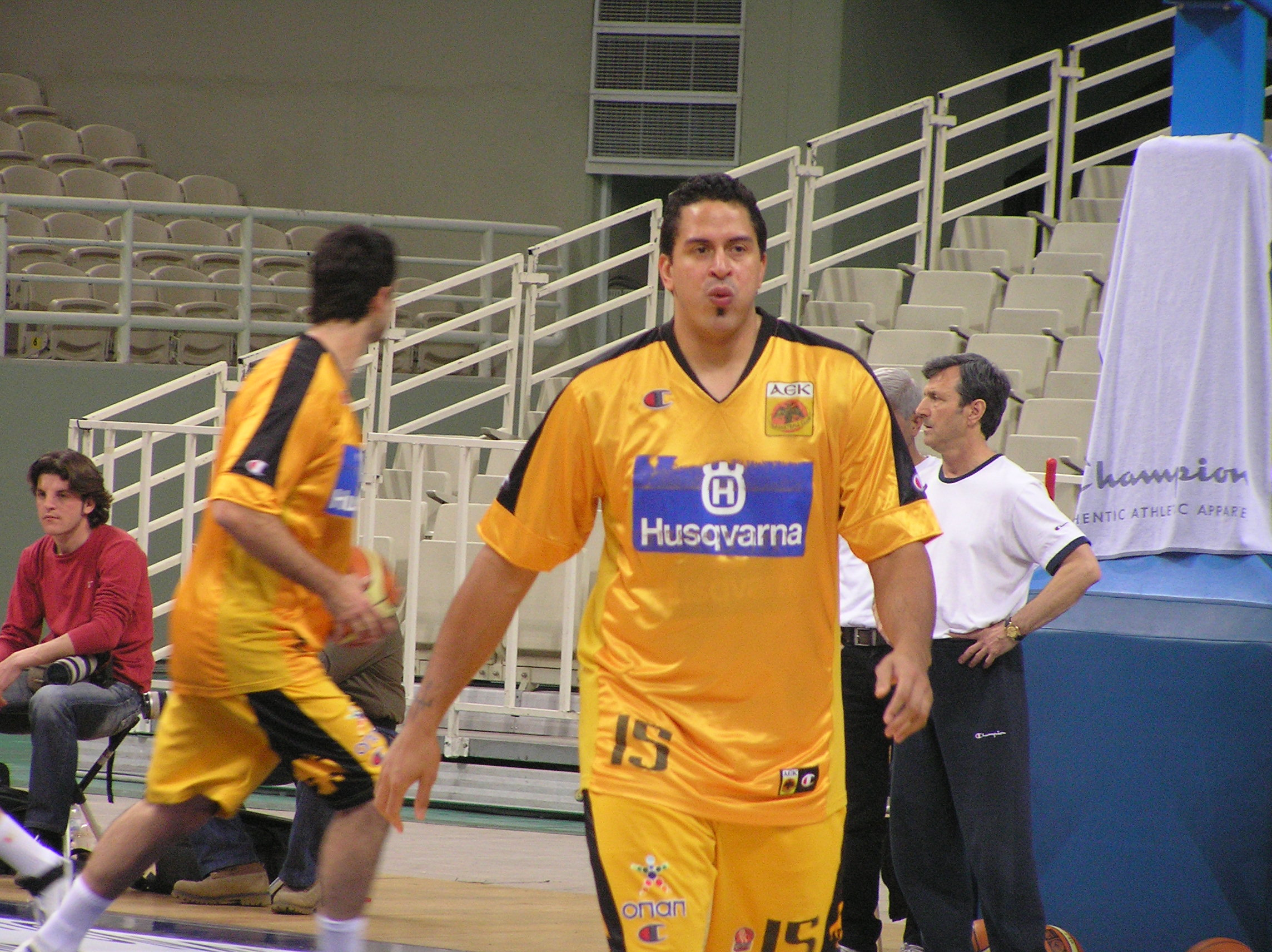
Brent Scott made the first team three times.

The following table only lists players with at least three total selections.

Player	Total	First team	Second team	MVP	Seasons
(United States) Andre Perry	4	2	2	-	6
(United States) Brent Scott	3	3	-	1	3
(United States) Norris Coleman	3	2	1	-	9
(United States) Darrell Armstrong	3	2	1	-	3
(United States) Kareem Reid	3	1	2	-	5

== See also ==
- United States Basketball League
