= 1987 USBL All-Star Game =

1985 USBL-organized All-Star Game

USBL All-Stars	Rhode Island Gulls
112	119
- Date: June 27, 1987
- Venue: Community College of Rhode Island, Warwick, Rhode Island
- MVP: Muggsy Bogues

The 1987 United States Basketball League All-Star Game was the third All-Star Game organised by the league. It was held at the Community College of Rhode Island in Warwick, Rhode Island on June 27, 1987, in a packed court. The hosts Rhode Island Gulls defeated the USBL All-Stars 119–112.

Muggsy Bogues of Rhode Island Gulls was named the MVP.

The 1985 All-Star team featured legendary players like Eddie Lee Wilkins, Sugar Ray Richardson, World B. Free, and Mitchell Wiggins.

== The 1987 USBL All-Star Game ==
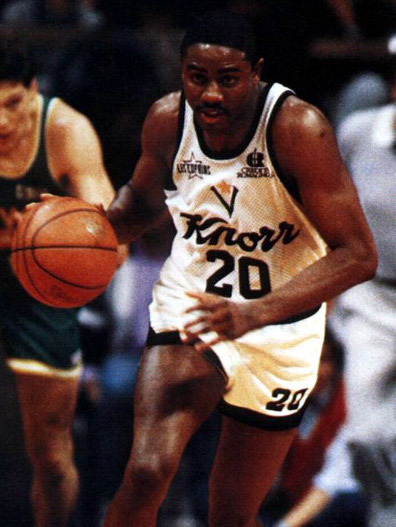
Sugar Ray Richardson, a four-time NBA All-Star, was selected for the USBL All-Stars.

Hosts Rhode Island Gulls had finished third in the 1987 United States Basketball League (record 17–13).

=== The Game ===
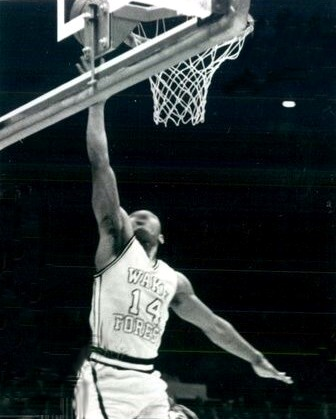
Muggsy Bogues was named the MVP.

1987 NBA Draft (12th pick) Muggsy Bogues of Rhode Island Gulls stood out with his performance and led his team to victory. Bogues scored 21 pts and gave 13 assists. After the game he received a standing ovation.

Arne Duncan who later served as the 9th United States secretary of education was also a Rhode Island Gulls player.

== All-Star teams ==
=== Rosters ===
Rhode Island Gulls
Pos.	Player	Previous Appearances
Team
G	(United States) Muggsy Bogues	
F	(United States) Leroy Combs	
F	(United States) Raleigh Choice	
G	(United States) Vince Johnson	
F	(United States) Tony Brown	
F	(United States) Hank McDowell	
G	(United States) Dominic Pressley	
G	(United States) Arne Duncan	
F	(United States) Andre Turner	
F	(United States) David Kipfer	
F	(United States) Robert Godbolt	
G	(United States) Andre LaFleur	
Head coach: (United States) George Whittaker

USBL All-Stars
Pos.	Player	Team	Previous appearances
Team
G	(United States) Don Collins	Tampa Bay Stars	
C	(United States) Henry Carr	Staten Island Stallions	
F	(United States) Richard Rellford	West Palm Beach Stingrays	
C	(United States) Eddie Lee Wilkins	Staten Island Stallions	
F	(United States) Bobby Parks	Miami Tropics	
F	(United States) Norris Coleman	Tampa Bay Flash	
F	(United States) (France) Michael Brooks	Philadelphia Aces	
G	(United States) Geoff Huston	Long Island Knights	
G	(United States) World B. Free	Miami Tropics	
G	(United States) Mitchell Wiggins	Tampa Bay Flash	
G	(Canada) Stewart Granger	Tampa Bay Flash	
G	(United States) Sugar Ray Richardson	Long Island Knights	
Head coach:

=== Result ===
Team 1	Score	Team 2
Rhode Island Gulls	119- 112	USBL All-Stars

== Awards ==
MVP	Topscorer
(United States) Muggsy Bogues	(United States) Muggsy Bogues

== The USBL All-Stars ==
The league USBL All-Stars were also used as a Travel Team for friendly matches against national teams and forign clubs.

== Former NBA players ==
- Sugar Ray Richardson
- Mitchell Wiggins
- World B. Free
- Eddie Lee Wilkins
- Michael Brooks
- Stewart Granger
- Geoff Huston
- Norris Coleman
- Tony Brown
- Leroy Combs
- Hank McDowell

== See also ==
- 1991 USBL All-Star Game
- 1985 USBL All-Star Game
- United States Basketball League

== Sources ==
- USBL 1985-1991
