= 1991 USBL All-Star Game =

1985 USBL-organized All-Star Game

USBL All-Stars	Empire State Stallions
132	126
- Date: June 29, 1991
- Venue: Glens Falls Civic Center, Glens Falls, New York
- MVP: Paul Snoop Graham
- Network: ABC

The 1991 United States Basketball League All-Star Game was the 6th All-Star Game organised by the league since its inception in 1985. It was held at the Glens Falls Civic Center in Glens Falls, New York on June 29, 1991. The hosts Empire State Stallions were defeated by the USBL All-Stars 132–126.

Paul Snoop Graham of the USBL All-Stars was named the MVP.

== The 1991 USBL All-Star Game ==
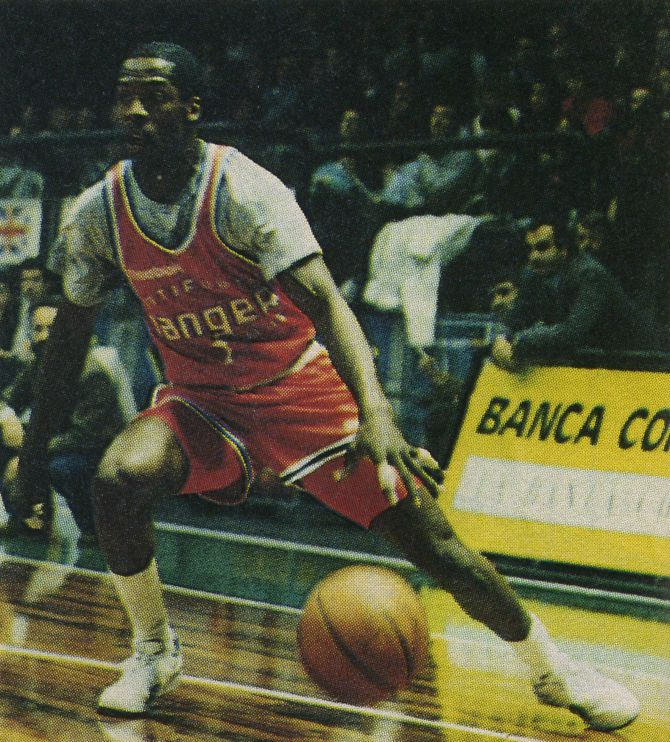
Wes Matthews was selected for the USBL All-Stars.

The Stallions had finished 4th in the USBL's North Division in 1987 (record 7–13).

Future NBA players Greg Sutton and Keith "Mister" Jennings played in the 1991 edition. In total five members of the 1991 All Star Game had NBA experience: Earl Cureton, Antony Mason, Norris Coleman, Wes Matthews and Michael Anderson.

=== The Game ===
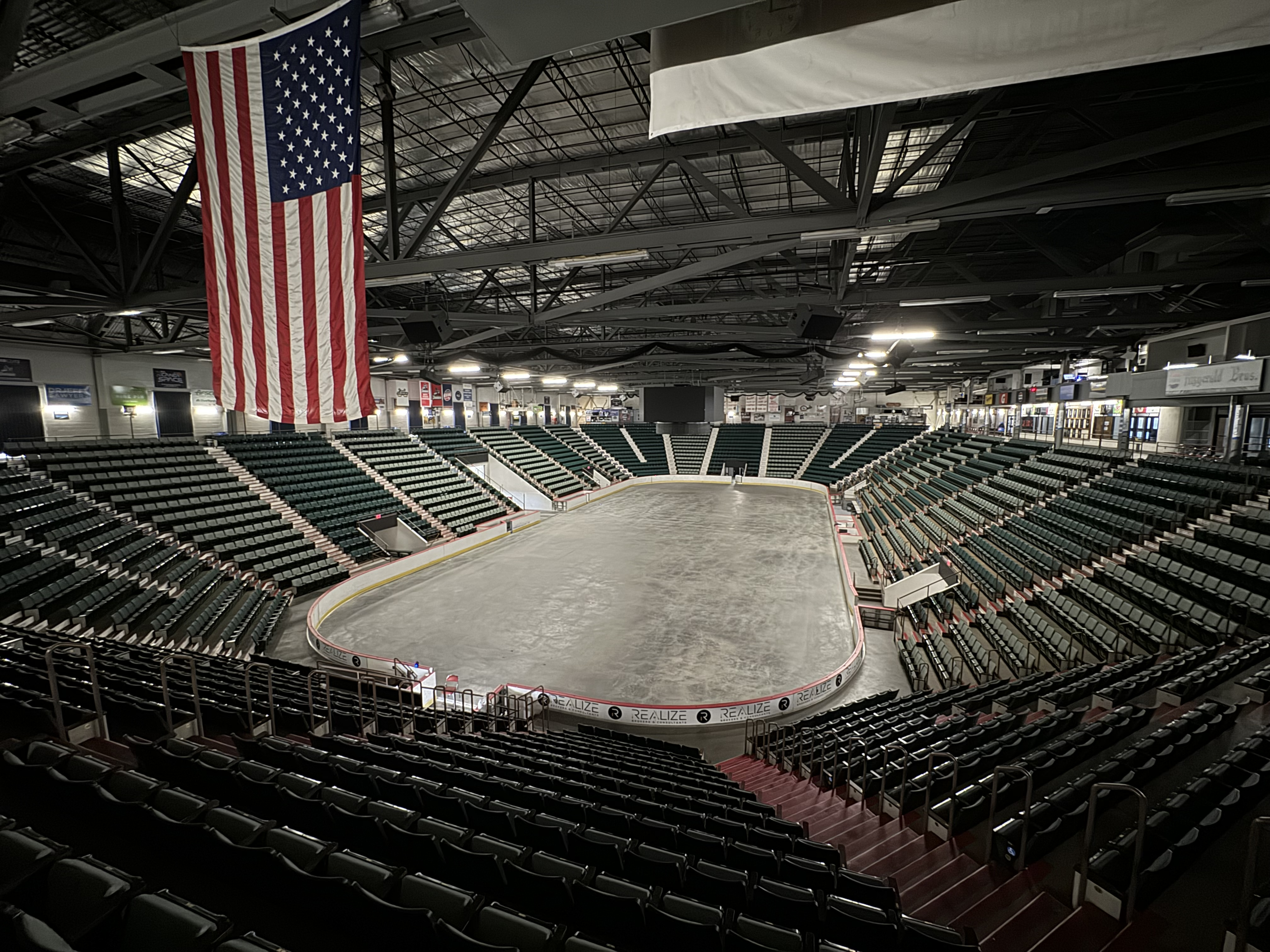
Glens Falls Civic Center in 2024.

Paul Snoop Graham led the USBL All-Stars to victory, a couple of months before he signed for NBA franchise, Atlanta Hawks. The game started at 7.30 pm, and it was broadcast by ABC.

== All-Star teams ==
=== Rosters ===
Empire State Stallions
Pos.	Player	Previous Appearances
Team
G	(United States) Greg Sutton	
C	(United States) Kenny Green	
F	(United States) Brian Howard	
F	(United States) Barry Sumpter	
Head coach: (United States) Jim Sleeper

USBL All-Stars
Pos.	Player	Team	Previous appearances
Team
F	(United States) Paul Snoop Graham	Philadelphia Spirit	
F	(United States) Antony Mason	Long Island Surf	
C	(United States) Earl Cureton	New Haven Skyhawks	
G	(United States) Wes Matthews	Atlanta Eagles	
F	(United States) Norris Coleman	Jacksonville Hooters	1987, 1988
G	(United States) Michael Anderson	Philadelphia Spirit	
G	(United States) Keith "Mister" Jennings	Jacksonville Hooters	
C	(United States) Chuck Nevitt	Miami Tropics	
Head coach: Rex Morgan

=== Result ===
Team 1	Score	Team 2
Empire State Stallions	126- 132	USBL All-Stars

== Awards ==
MVP	Topscorer
(United States) Paul Snoop Graham	

== The USBL All-Stars ==
The league USBL All-Stars were also used as a Travel Team for friendly matches against national teams and foreign clubs. In 1991, the USBL All-Stars won the silver medal in the Winston Mundial basketball cup (July 26–28, San Juan, Puerto Rico) under coach Rex Morgan, competing against 6 national teams (Soviet Union, Brazil, Puerto Rico, Canada, Mexico, Cuba) and KK POP 84. The USBL All-Stars, wearing white and red jerseys, lost to Puerto Rico in the final (93–86) in front of 12,000 fans at the Coliseo Roberto Clemente. Six of the USBL All-Stars had NBA experience.

== Former NBA players ==
- Chuck Nevitt
- Norris Coleman
- Michael Anderson
- Wes Matthews
- Earl Cureton
- Antony Mason

== See also ==
- 1987 USBL All-Star Game
- 1985 USBL All-Star Game
- United States Basketball League

== Sources ==
- USBL 1985-1991
