= 1985 USBL All-Star Game =

1985 USBL-organized All-Star Game

USBL All-Stars	Springfield Fame
75	87
- Date: July 3, 1985
- Venue: Springfield Civic Center, Springfield, Massachusetts
- MVP: Michael Adams
- Attendance: 5,093
- Network: HTS

The 1985 United States Basketball League All-Star Game was the inaugural All-Star Game organised by the league. It was held at the Springfield Civic Center in Springfield, Massachusetts on July 3, 1985, in front of 5,093 spectators. The hosts Springfield Fame defeated the USBL All-Stars 87–75.

Michael Adams of Springfield Fame was named the MVP.

The 1985 All-Star team featured legendary players like Manute Bol, Spud Webb, and John "Hot Rod" Williams.

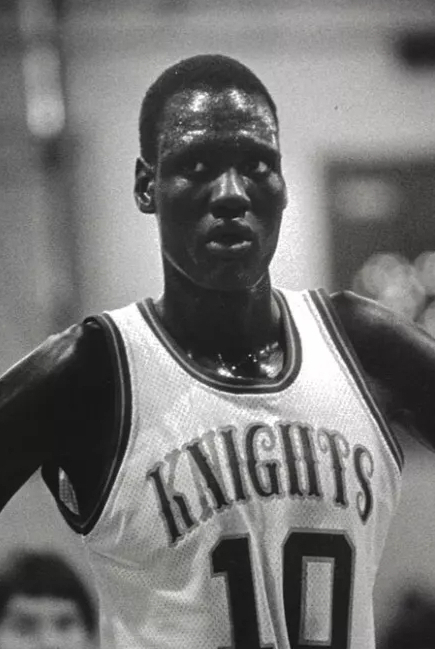
Manute Bol was selected to play for the USBL All-Stars

== The 1985 USBL All-Star Game ==
Hosts Springfield Fame were awarded the event as reigning champions of the United States Basketball League (record 19–6). The game started at 5 pm and it was broadcast live by HTS.

=== The game ===
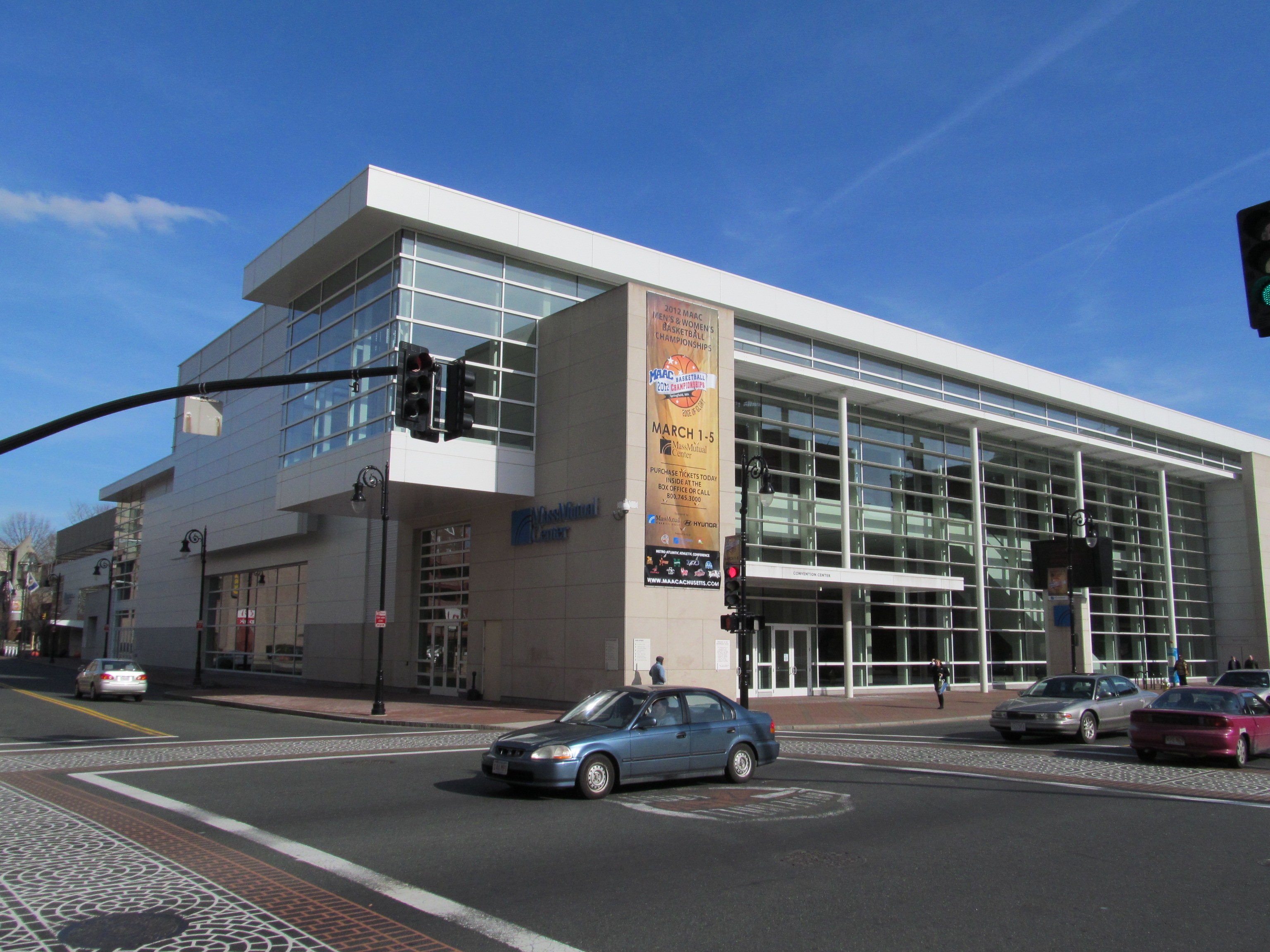
Springfield Civic Center.

The hosts led by as much as 19 points in the third quarter. But Williams of the Rhode Island Gulls, scored five points with three minutes left in the fourth quarter and the All Stars took the lead. But, Adams scored six straight points to put the Fame back on top, 80–69.

Michael Adams scored a total of 18 points and had 7 steals for the winners.

== All-Star teams ==
=== Rosters ===
Springfield Fame
Pos.	Player	Previous Appearances
Team
G	(United States) Tracy Jackson	
F	(United States) Michael Adams	
C	(Canada) Ron Crevier	
F	(United States) Andre Goode	
F	(United States) (France) Larry Lawrence	
F	(United States) Oliver Lee	
G	(United States) Sam Worthen	
G	(United States) Tony Hanson	
F	(United States) Alvis Rogers	
G	(United States) (Republic of Ireland) Dan Trant	
Head coach: (United States) Gerald Oliver

USBL All-Stars
Pos.	Player	Team	Previous appearances
Team
G	(United States) Spud Webb	Rhode Island Gulls	
F	(United States) John "Hot Rod" Williams	Rhode Island Gulls	
C	(Sudan) (United States) Manute Bol	Rhode Island Gulls	
Head coach:

=== Result ===
Team 1	Score	Team 2
Springfield Fame	87- 75	USBL All-Stars

== Awards ==
MVP	Topscorer
(United States) Michael Adams	(United States) Michael Adams

== The USBL All-Stars ==
The league USBL All-Stars were also used as a Travel Team for friendly matches against national teams and forign clubs.

== Former NBA players ==
- Sam Worthen
- Tracy Jackson

== See also ==
- 1987 USBL All-Star Game
- United States Basketball League

== Sources ==
- USBL 1985-1991
