= Ron Moore (basketball) =

American basketball player (born 1962)

Personal information
- Born: June 16, 1962 (age 64) New York City, New York, U.S.
- Listed height: 7 ft 0 in (2.13 m)
- Listed weight: 260 lb (118 kg)

Career information
- High school: Clarksville (Clarksville, Arkansas)
- College: Salem (1982–1984); West Virginia State (1985–1987)
- NBA draft: 1987: 2nd round, 25th overall pick
- Drafted by: New York Knicks
- Playing career: 1987–1999
- Position: Center
- Number: 54, 53

Career history
- 1987: Miami Tropics
- 1987–1988: Detroit Pistons
- 1988: Phoenix Suns
- 1988–1989: Tours Joué
- 1990–1991: Omaha Racers
- 1991: Oklahoma City Cavalry
- 1991: Rockford Lightning
- 1992–1992: Atenas Cordoba
- 1992: New Jersey Jammers
- 1993–1994: Keravnos
- 1997: Westchester Kings
- 1998–1999: Long Island Surf
- Stats at NBA.com
- Stats at Basketball Reference

Ronald Keith Moore (born June 16, 1962) is an American former professional basketball player. He played in the National Basketball Association (NBA) for the Detroit Pistons and Phoenix Suns during the 1987–88 season. Moore also played in the Continental Basketball Association, United States Basketball League, and various professional leagues in France, Argentina, and Cyprus. He served as player-assistant coach for the Westchester Kings in 1997.

== Career statistics ==
Legend
GP	Games played	GS	Games started	MPG	Minutes per game
FG%	Field goal percentage	3P%	3-point field goal percentage	FT%	Free throw percentage
RPG	Rebounds per game	APG	Assists per game	SPG	Steals per game
BPG	Blocks per game	PPG	Points per game	**Bold**	Career high

=== NBA ===
==== Regular season ====
Year	Team	GP	GS	MPG	FG%	3P%	FT%	RPG	APG	SPG	BPG	PPG
1987–88	Detroit	**9**	0	2.8	.308	–	.500	.2	**.1**	.2	.0	1.1
1987–88	San Antonio	5	0	**6.8**	**.313**	–	**1.000**	**1.2**	.0	**.6**	.0	**2.8**
Career		14	0	4.2	.310	–	.750	.6	.1	.4	.0	1.7
