= Rowan Gomes =

Antiguan basketball player

Personal information
- Born: 25 August 1962 St. John's, Antigua
- Died: 11 September 2023 (aged 61)
- Listed height: 6 ft 8 in (2.03 m)
- Listed weight: 235 lb (107 kg)

Career information
- College: Hampton (1983–1987)
- NBA draft: 1987: 7th round, 146th overall pick
- Drafted by: Denver Nuggets
- Position: Power forward

Career history

Playing
- 1988: Melbourne Tigers

Coaching
- 2018: Potters Steelers
- Stats at Basketball Reference

Rowan "Tekel" Gomes (25 August 1962 – 11 September 2023) was an Antiguan professional basketball player. He played college basketball in the United States for the Hampton Pirates and was selected in the 1987 NBA draft by the Denver Nuggets. Gomes played professionally in Australia and Spain.

== Early life ==
Gomes was born on 25 August 1962. He was raised in St. John's, Antigua, and started playing basketball due to his tall height despite Antigua having a lack of facilities and proper coaching. Gomes only played two years of basketball in high school. He made the Antiguan national basketball team in 1980 and was noticed by a recruiter from the United States when he played in a South American tournament.

== College career ==
Gomes moved to Virginia in 1982 so he could attend Hampton University. He played for the Hampton Pirates basketball team from 1983 to 1987. Gomes had to adjust to the American system as he would "just run, get the ball and go" while playing in Antigua. He averaged 2.5 points and 2.8 rebounds in 10 games played during his freshman season. Pirates head coach Hank Ford observed that Gomes improved during his sophomore season and was poised to become an integral part of the team. Gomes averaged 11.1 points and 7.6 rebounds during his senior season.

Gomes graduated with a degree in physical education.

== Professional career ==
Gomes was selected by the Denver Nuggets in the seventh round as the 146th overall pick of the 1987 NBA draft. He aspired to be the first Antiguan to play in the National Basketball Association (NBA). The Nuggets encouraged Gomes to play in Australia and he signed with the Melbourne Tigers of the National Basketball League in 1987. In his second appearance with the Tigers during a game against the Westside Saints on 13 February 1988, Gomes had an opportunity to make a game-winning play but slipped and injured his right knee. He was diagnosed with a patellar tendon rupture and was ruled out for the rest of the season. On 24 February, Gomes was replaced on the Tigers roster by Alvis Rogers.

Gomes attended training camp with the Oklahoma City Cavalry of the Continental Basketball Association in 1991.

Gomes also played professionally in Spain. He played for Lester's Flyers and Deputy Quakers in Antigua.

== Post-playing career ==
Gomes had a brief tenure as head coach of the Potters Steelers in 2018.

Gomes worked with Baba Trucking at the time of his death.

== Personal life ==
Gomes was friends with cricketer Viv Richards.

Gomes died on 11 September 2023.
