= 1987 NBA draft =

Basketball player selection

General information
- Sport: Basketball
- Date: June 22, 1987
- Location: Felt Forum, Madison Square Garden (New York City, New York)
- Network: TBS Superstation

Overview
- 161 total selections in 7 rounds
- League: NBA
- First selection: David Robinson (San Antonio Spurs)
- Hall of Famers: 4: C David Robinson; SF Scottie Pippen; SG Reggie Miller; SG Šarūnas Marčiulionis

The 1987 NBA draft was held on June 22, 1987, in New York City.

This draft included two future members of the NBA 50 Greatest Players and the basketball Hall of Fame, David Robinson and Scottie Pippen, as well as fellow Hall of Famer Reggie Miller, who was named to the NBA 75th Anniversary Team. Other notable selections include Kevin Johnson, Kenny Smith, Horace Grant, Reggie Lewis, Muggsy Bogues, Mark Jackson, and Šarūnas Marčiulionis. Also in this draft was former Florida Gators men's basketball head coach Billy Donovan (drafted 68th by the Utah Jazz), who led that program to NCAA Division I Men's Basketball Championships in 2006 and in 2007.

David Robinson did not join the NBA until the 1989–90 season due to his service commitment with the United States Navy. This was the last NBA draft to go over three rounds, as it was reduced to three the next year and later to two since 1989.

== Draft selections ==
PG	Point guard	SG	Shooting guard	SF	Small forward	PF	Power forward	C	Center

^	Denotes player who has been inducted to the Naismith Memorial Basketball Hall of Fame
*	Denotes player who has been selected for at least one All-Star Game and All-NBA Team
^{+}	Denotes player who has been selected for at least one All-Star Game
^{x}	Denotes player who has been selected for at least one All-NBA Team
^{#}	Denotes player who has never appeared in an NBA regular-season or playoff game
^{~}	Denotes player who has been selected as Rookie of the Year

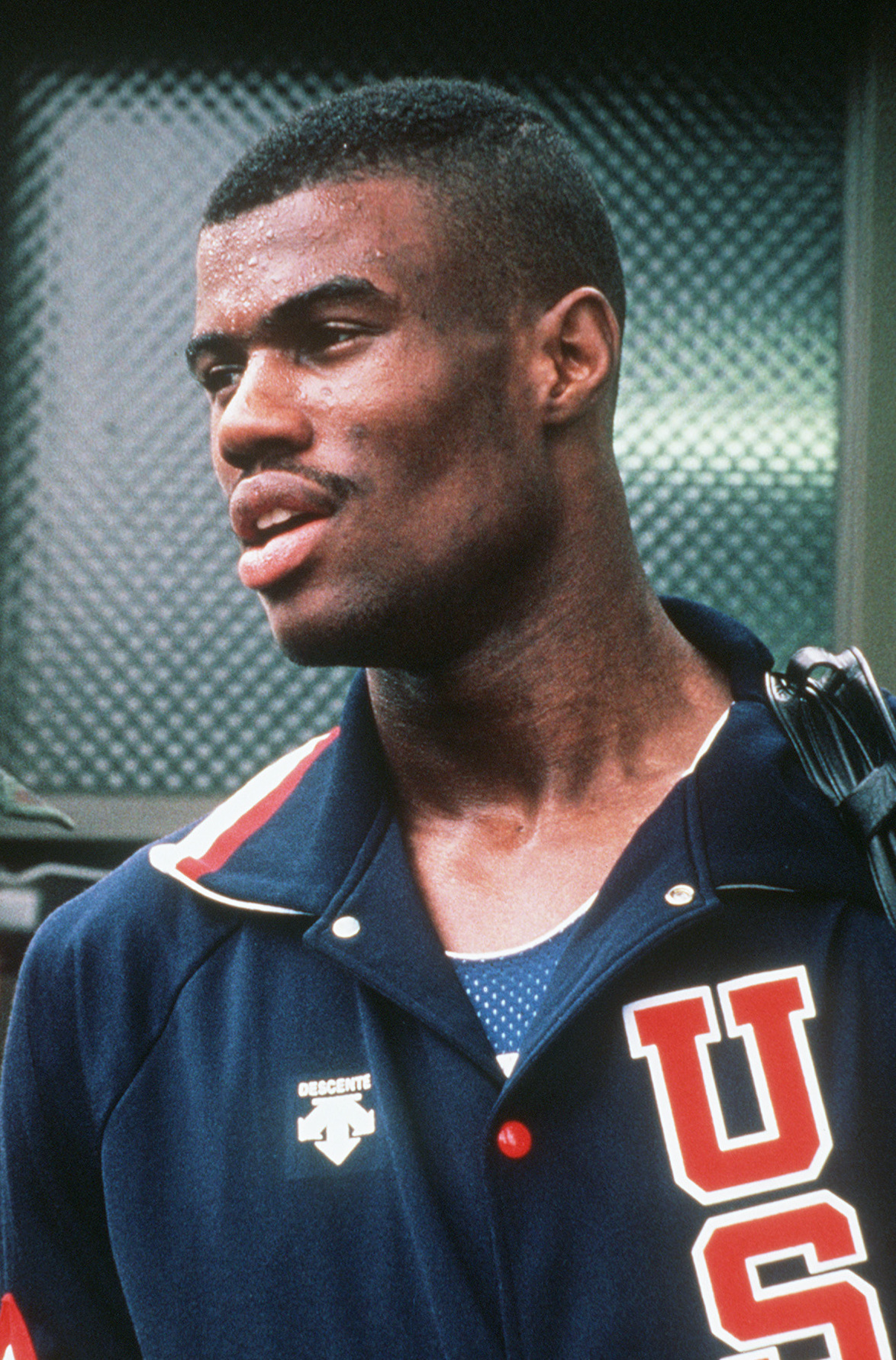
David Robinson, the 1st pick

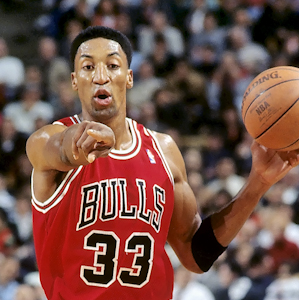
Scottie Pippen, the 5th pick

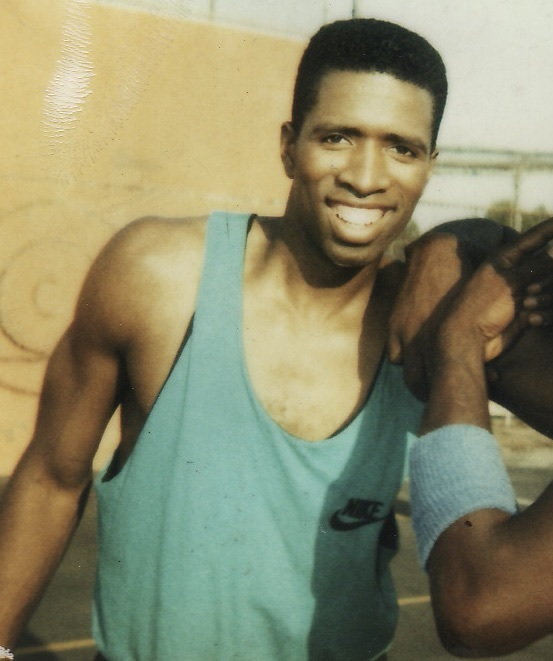
Kenny Smith, the 6th pick

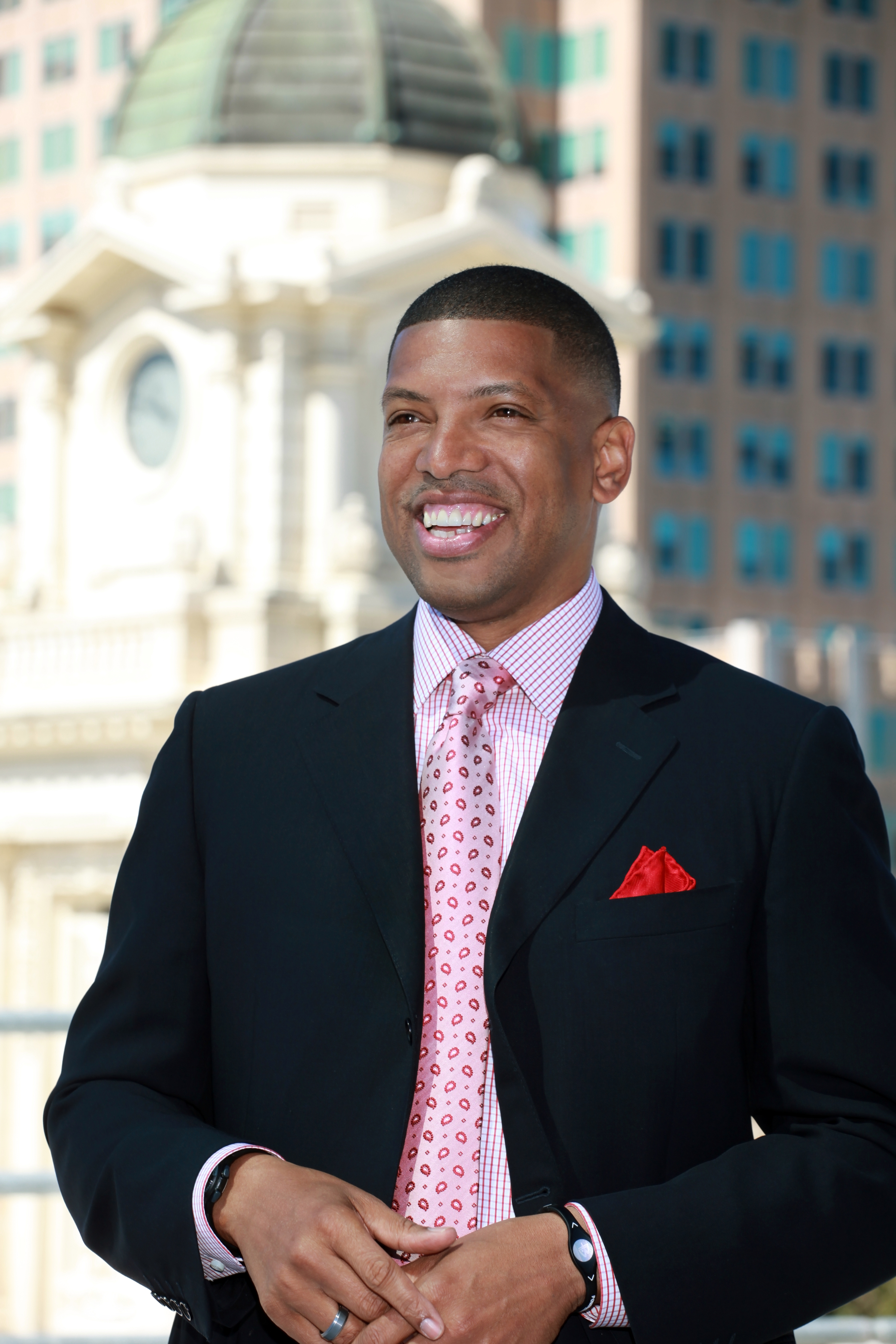
Kevin Johnson, the 7th pick

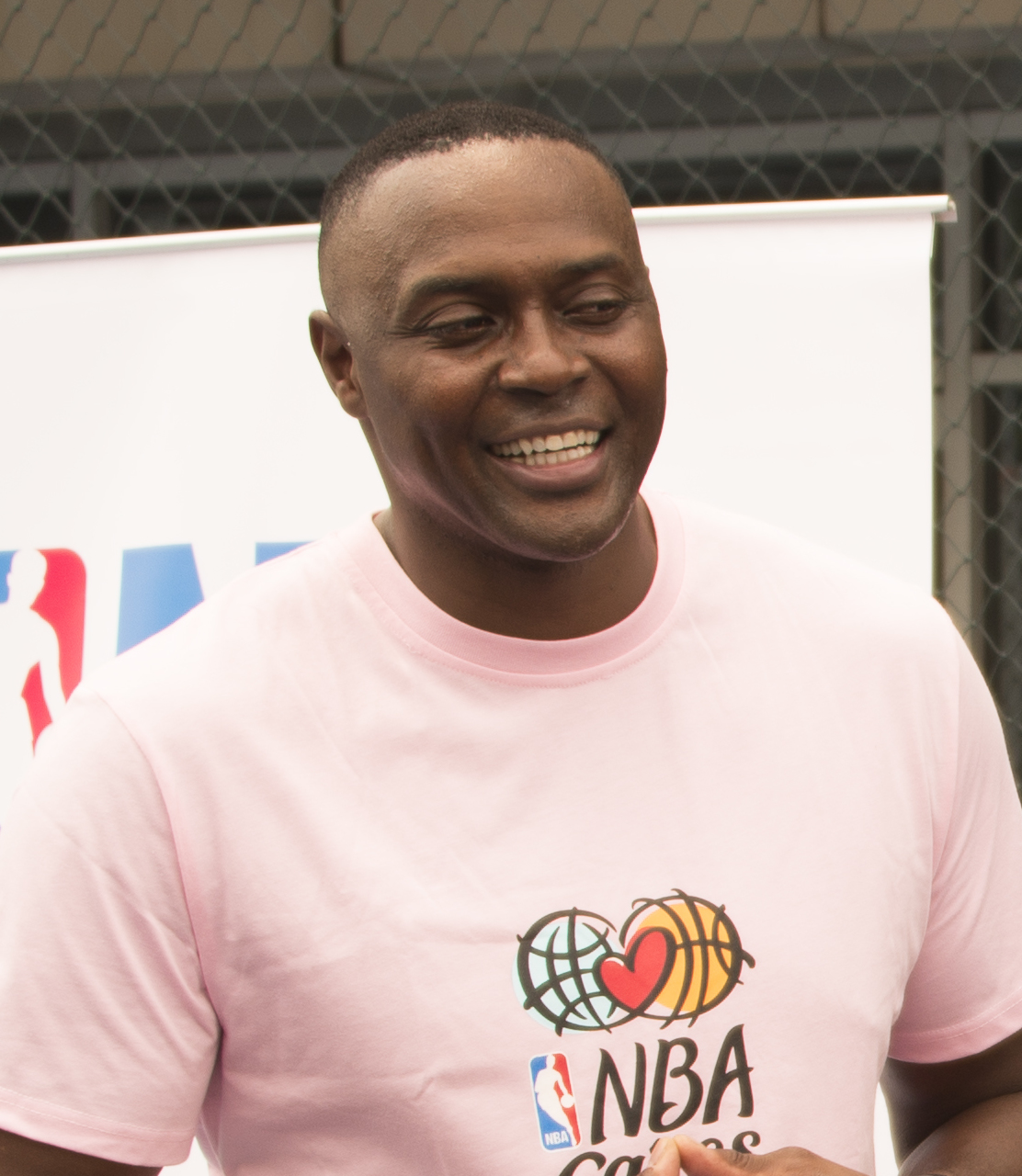
Horace Grant, the 10th pick

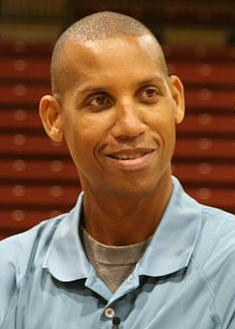
Reggie Miller, the 11th pick

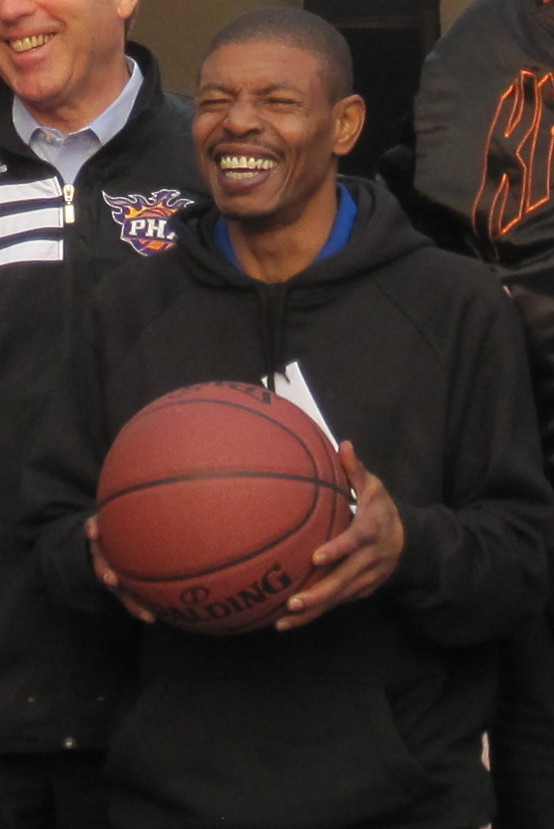
Muggsy Bogues, the 12th pick

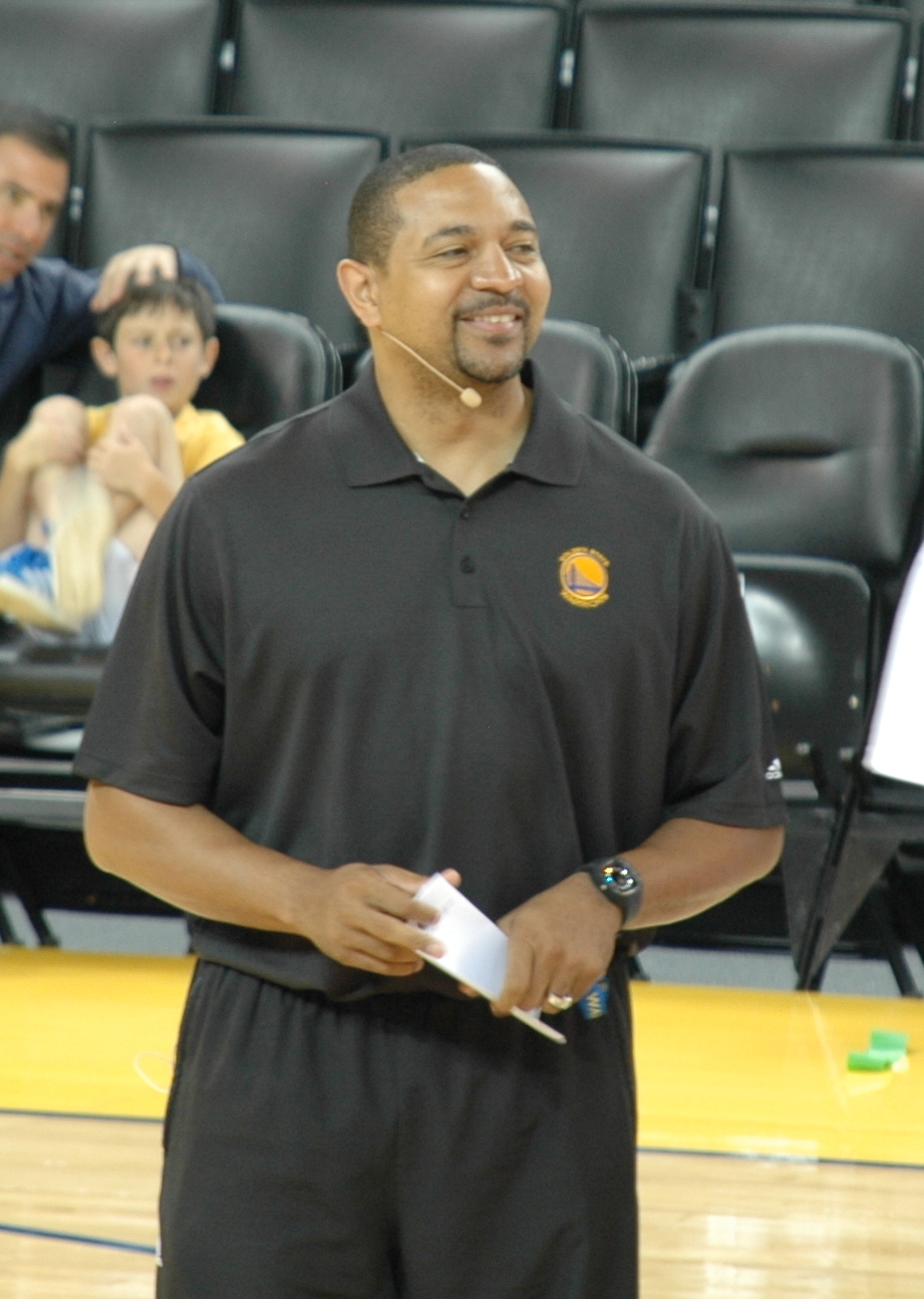
Mark Jackson, the 18th pick

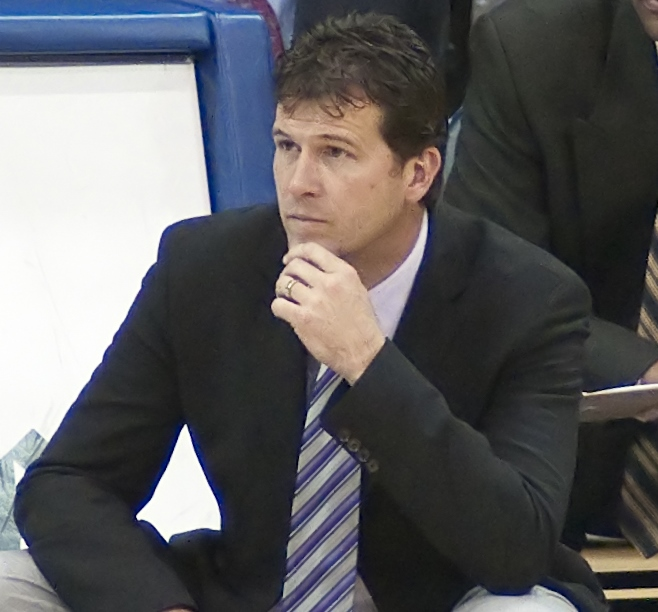
Steve Alford, the 26th pick

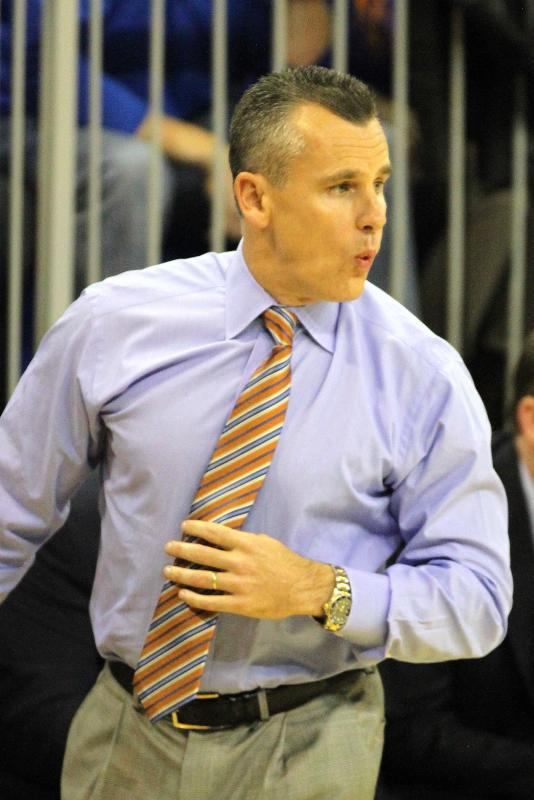
Billy Donovan, the 68th pick

Round	Pick	Player	Position	Nationality (Note: Nationality indicates the player's national team or representative nationality. If a player has not competed at the international level, then the nationality indicates the national team which the player is eligible to represent according to FIBA rules.)	Team	School/club team
1	1	David Robinson^^{~}	C	United States	San Antonio Spurs	Navy (Sr.)
1	2	Armen Gilliam	PF	United States	Phoenix Suns	UNLV (Sr.)
1	3	Dennis Hopson	SF	United States	New Jersey Nets	Ohio State (Sr.)
1	4	Reggie Williams	SF	United States	Los Angeles Clippers	Georgetown (Sr.)
1	5	Scottie Pippen^	SF	United States	Seattle SuperSonics (from New York, traded to Chicago)	Central Arkansas (Sr.)
1	6	Kenny Smith	PG	United States	Sacramento Kings	North Carolina (Sr.)
1	7	Kevin Johnson*	PG	United States	Cleveland Cavaliers	California (Sr.)
1	8	Olden Polynice	C	Haiti	Chicago Bulls (from Denver via New York, traded to Seattle)	Hamby Rimini (Italy)
1	9	Derrick McKey	SF/PF	United States	Seattle SuperSonics	Alabama (Jr.)
1	10	Horace Grant^{+}	PF/C	United States	Chicago Bulls	Clemson (Sr.)
1	11	Reggie Miller^	SG	United States	Indiana Pacers	UCLA (Sr.)
1	12	Muggsy Bogues	PG	United States	Washington Bullets	Wake Forest (Sr.)
1	13	Joe Wolf	C	United States	Los Angeles Clippers (from Houston)	North Carolina (Sr.)
1	14	Tellis Frank	PF	United States	Golden State Warriors	Western Kentucky (Sr.)
1	15	José Ortiz	PF	Puerto Rico	Utah Jazz	Oregon State (Sr.)
1	16	Christian Welp	C	West Germany	Philadelphia 76ers	Washington (Sr.)
1	17	Ronnie Murphy	SG	United States	Portland Trail Blazers	Jacksonville (Sr.)
1	18	Mark Jackson^{+~}	PG	United States	New York Knicks (from Milwaukee via Seattle)	St. John's (Sr.)
1	19	Ken Norman	SF	United States	Los Angeles Clippers (from Detroit)	Illinois (Sr.)
1	20	Jim Farmer	SG	United States	Dallas Mavericks	Alabama (Sr.)
1	21	Dallas Comegys	C	United States	Atlanta Hawks	DePaul (Sr.)
1	22	Reggie Lewis^{+}	SG	United States	Boston Celtics	Northeastern (Sr.)
1	23	Greg "Cadillac" Anderson	PF	United States	San Antonio Spurs (from L.A. Lakers)	Houston (Sr.)
2	24	Freddie Banks^{#}	SG	United States	Detroit Pistons	UNLV (Sr.)
2	25	Ron Moore	C	United States	New York Knicks	West Virginia State (Sr.)
2	26	Steve Alford	SG	United States	Dallas Mavericks	Indiana (Sr.)
2	27	Nate Blackwell	PG	United States	San Antonio Spurs	Temple (Sr.)
2	28	Rickie Winslow	SF	United States	Chicago Bulls	Houston (Sr.)
2	29	Lester Fonville^{#}	C	United States	Portland Trail Blazers	Jackson State (Sr.)
2	30	Nikita Wilson	SF	United States	Portland Trail Blazers	LSU (Sr.)
2	31	Andre Moore	PF	United States	Denver Nuggets	Loyola (IL) (Jr.)
2	32	Bob McCann	SF	United States	Milwaukee Bucks	Morehead State (Sr.)
2	33	Tony White	PG	United States	Chicago Bulls	Tennessee (Sr.)
2	34	Brian Rowsom	PF	United States	Indiana Pacers	UNC Wilmington (Sr.)
2	35	Doug Lee	SG	United States	Houston Rockets	Purdue (Sr.)
2	36	Duane Washington	SG	United States	Washington Bullets	Middle Tennessee (Sr.)
2	37	Derrick Dowell^{#}	SF	United States	Washington Bullets	USC (Sr.)
2	38	Norris Coleman	SF	United States	Los Angeles Clippers	Kansas State (So.)
2	39	Vincent Askew	SG/SF	United States	Philadelphia 76ers	Memphis State (Jr.)
2	40	Winston Garland	PG	United States	Milwaukee Bucks	Southwest Missouri State (Sr.)
2	41	Kannard Johnson	SF	United States	Cleveland Cavaliers	Western Kentucky (Sr.)
2	42	Terrance Bailey^{#}	SG	United States	Atlanta Hawks	Wagner (Sr.)
2	43	Andrew Kennedy^{#}	F	Jamaica	Philadelphia 76ers	Virginia (Sr.)
2	44	Terry Coner^{#}	PG	United States	Atlanta Hawks	Alabama (Sr.)
2	45	Brad Lohaus	PF/C	United States	Boston Celtics	Iowa (Sr.)
2	46	Bruce Dalrymple^{#}	G	United States	Phoenix Suns	Georgia Tech (Sr.)
3	47	Tim McCalister^{#}	G	United States	Los Angeles Clippers	Oklahoma (Sr.)
3	48	Jamie Waller	SG	United States	New Jersey Nets	Virginia Union (Sr.)
3	49	Jerome Batiste^{#}	F	United States	New York Knicks	McNeese State (Sr.)
3	50	Phil Zevenbergen	C	United States	San Antonio Spurs	Washington (Sr.)
3	51	Sven Meyer^{#}	C	Germany	Sacramento Kings	Oregon (Sr.)
3	52	Donald Royal	SF	United States	Cleveland Cavaliers	Notre Dame (Sr.)
3	53	Winston Crite	SF	United States	Phoenix Suns	Texas A&M (Sr.)
3	54	Tom Schafer^{#}	F	United States	Denver Nuggets	Iowa State (Sr.)
3	55	Tommy Amaker^{#}	G	United States	Seattle SuperSonics	Duke (Sr.)
3	56	John Fox^{#}	F	United States	Chicago Bulls	Millersville (Sr.)
3	57	Hansi Gnad^{#}	F	Germany	Philadelphia 76ers	Alaska Anchorage (Sr.)
3	58	Darryl Johnson	PG	United States	Golden State Warriors	Michigan State (Sr.)
3	59	Danny Pearson^{#}	F	United States	Washington Bullets	Jacksonville (Sr.)
3	60	Sean Couch^{#}	F	United States	Indiana Pacers	Columbia (Sr.)
3	61	Clarence Martin^{#}	C	United States	Utah Jazz	Western Kentucky (Sr.)
3	62	Tim McCalister^{#}	F	United States	Philadelphia 76ers	Rutgers (Sr.)
3	63	Kevin Gamble	SG	United States	Portland Trail Blazers	Iowa (Sr.)
3	64	J. J. Weber^{#}	F	United States	Milwaukee Bucks	Wisconsin (Sr.)
3	65	Eric White	PF	United States	Detroit Pistons	Pepperdine (Sr.)
3	66	Mike Richmond^{#}	C	United States	Dallas Mavericks	UTEP (Sr.)
3	67	Song Tao^{#}	F	China	Atlanta Hawks	Shandong (China)
3	68	Billy Donovan	PG	United States	Utah Jazz	Providence (Sr.)
3	69	Willie Glass^{#}	F	United States	Los Angeles Lakers	St. John's (Sr.)
4	70	Tom Sheehey^{#}	C	United States	Boston Celtics	Virginia (Sr.)
4	71	Mike Morgan^{#}	C	United States	New York Knicks	Drake (Sr.)
4	72	Andrew Moten^{#}	G	United States	New Jersey Nets	Florida (Sr.)
4	73	Todd May^{#}	F	United States	San Antonio Spurs	Pikeville (Sr.)
4	74	Joe Arlauckas	SF	United States	Sacramento Kings	Niagara (Sr.)
4	75	Chris Dudley	C	United States	Cleveland Cavaliers	Yale (Sr.)
4	76	Steve Beck^{#}	G	United States	Phoenix Suns	Arizona State (Sr.)
4	77	David Boone^{#}	F	United States	Denver Nuggets	Marquette (Sr.)
4	78	Todd Linder^{#}	F	United States	Seattle SuperSonics	Tampa (Sr.)
4	79	Jack Haley	C	United States	Chicago Bulls	UCLA (Sr.)
4	80	Carven Holcombe^{#}	G	United States	Cleveland Cavaliers	TCU (Sr.)
4	81	Scott Thompson^{#}	C	United States	Washington Bullets	San Diego (Sr.)
4	82	Joe Niego^{#}	F	United States	Houston Rockets	Lewis (Sr.)
4	83	Bennie Bolton^{#}	F	United States	Golden State Warriors	NC State (Sr.)
4	84	Reuben Holmes^{#}	C	United States	Utah Jazz	Alabama State (Sr.)
4	85	Brian Rahilly^{#}	F	United States	Philadelphia 76ers	Tulsa (Sr.)
4	86	Norwood Barber^{#}	G	United States	Portland Trail Blazers	Florida State (Sr.)
4	87	Darryl Bedford^{#}	C	United States	Milwaukee Bucks	Austin Peay (Sr.)
4	88	Dave Popson	PF	United States	Detroit Pistons	North Carolina (Sr.)
4	89	David Johnson^{#}	F	United States	Dallas Mavericks	Oklahoma (Sr.)
4	90	Theofanis Christodoulou^{#}	C	Greece	Atlanta Hawks	Panionios (Greece)
4	91	Darryl Kennedy^{#}	F	United States	Boston Celtics	Oklahoma (Sr.)
4	92	Ralph Tally^{#}	G	United States	Los Angeles Lakers	Norfolk State (Sr.)
5	93	Chad Kessler^{#}	F	United States	Los Angeles Clippers	Georgia (Sr.)
4	94	James Blackmon Sr.^{#}	G	United States	New Jersey Nets	Kentucky (Sr.)
5	95	Glen Clem^{#}	F	United States	New York Knicks	Vanderbilt (Sr.)
5	96	Dennis Williams^{#}	G	United States	San Antonio Spurs	Georgia (Sr.)
5	97	Vernon Carr^{#}	G	United States	Sacramento Kings	Michigan State (Sr.)
5	98	Carl Lott^{#}	G	United States	Cleveland Cavaliers	TCU (Sr.)
5	99	Brent Counts^{#}	C	United States	Phoenix Suns	Pacific (Sr.)
5	100	Ronnie Grandison	SF	United States	Denver Nuggets	New Orleans (Sr.)
5	101	Michael Tait^{#}	G	United States	Seattle SuperSonics	Clemson (Sr.)
5	102	Anthony Wilson^{#}	G	United States	Chicago Bulls	LSU (Sr.)
5	103	Mike Milling^{#}	F	United States	Indiana Pacers	Charlotte (Sr.)
5	104	Andre LaFleur^{#}	G	United States	Houston Rockets	Northeastern (Sr.)
5	105	Terry Williams^{#}	C	United States	Golden State Warriors	SMU (Sr.)
5	106	Patrick Fairs^{#}	G	United States	Washington Bullets	Texas (Sr.)
5	107	Bart Kofoed	SG	United States	Utah Jazz	Nebraska–Kearney (Sr.)
5	108	Frank Ross^{#}	G	United States	Philadelphia 76ers	American (Sr.)
5	109	David Moss^{#}	F	United States	Portland Trail Blazers	Tulsa (Sr.)
5	110	Brian Vaughns^{#}	F	United States	Milwaukee Bucks	UC Santa Barbara (Sr.)
5	111	Gerry Wright^{#}	C	United States	Detroit Pistons	Iowa (Sr.)
5	112	Sam Hill^{#}	C	United States	Dallas Mavericks	Iowa State (Sr.)
5	113	José Antonio Montero^{#}	G	Spain	Atlanta Hawks	Joventut Badalona (Spain)
5	114	Dave Butler^{#}	F	United States	Boston Celtics	California (Sr.)
6	115	Kenny Travis^{#}	G	United States	Los Angeles Lakers	New Mexico State (Sr.)
6	116	Martin Nessley	C	United States	Los Angeles Clippers	Duke (Sr.)
6	117	Howard Triche^{#}	G	United States	New York Knicks	Syracuse (Sr.)
6	118	Perry Bromwell^{#}	G	United States	New Jersey Nets	Penn (Sr.)
6	119	Ricky Brown^{#}	F	United States	San Antonio Spurs	Pensacola Tornados (CBA)
6	120	Daryl Thomas^{#}	F	United States	Sacramento Kings	Indiana (Sr.)
6	121	Harold Jensen^{#}	G	United States	Cleveland Cavaliers	Villanova (Sr.)
6	122	Marcel Boyce^{#}	F	United States	Phoenix Suns	Akron (Sr.)
6	123	Kelvin Scarborough^{#}	G	United States	Denver Nuggets	New Mexico (Sr.)
6	124	Tom Gneiting^{#}	C	United States	Seattle SuperSonics	BYU (Sr.)
6	125	Doug Altenberger^{#}	G	United States	Chicago Bulls	Illinois (Sr.)
6	126	Gary Graham^{#}	G	United States	Indiana Pacers	UNLV (Sr.)
6	127	Šarūnas Marčiulionis^	SG	Soviet Union	Golden State Warriors	Statyba Vilnius (Soviet Union)
6	128	Dwayne Scholten^{#}	C	United States	Washington Bullets	Washington State (Sr.)
6	129	Fred Jenkins^{#}	G	United States	Houston Rockets	Tennessee (Sr.)
6	130	Art Sabb^{#}	G	United States	Utah Jazz	Bloomfield (Sr.)
6	131	Tracy Foster^{#}	G	United States	Philadelphia 76ers	UAB (Sr.)
6	132	Bernard Jackson^{#}	G	United States	Portland Trail Blazers	Loyola Chicago (Sr.)
6	133	Gay Elmore^{#}	F	United States	Milwaukee Bucks	VMI (Sr.)
6	134	Antoine Joubert^{#}	F	United States	Detroit Pistons	Michigan (Sr.)
6	135	Quintan Gates^{#}	F	United States	Dallas Mavericks	UTEP (Sr.)
6	136	Riccardo Morandotti^{#}	F	Italy	Atlanta Hawks	Berloni Torino (Italy)
6	137	Tim Naegeli^{#}	F	United States	Boston Celtics	Wisconsin–Stevens Point (Sr.)
6	138	Frank Ford^{#}	G	United States	Los Angeles Lakers	Auburn (Sr.)
7	139	Henry Carr^{#}	C	United States	Los Angeles Clippers	Wichita State (Sr.)
7	140	Frank Booker^{#}	G	United States	New Jersey Nets	Bowling Green (Sr.)
7	141	Wayne Williams^{#}	G	United States	New York Knicks	Saint Joseph's (Sr.)
7	142	Raynard Davis^{#}	F	United States	San Antonio Spurs	Texas (Sr.)
7	143	Scott Adubato^{#}	G	United States	Sacramento Kings	Upsala (Sr.)
7	144	Michael Foster^{#}	G	United States	Cleveland Cavaliers	South Carolina (Sr.)
7	145	Roy Singleton^{#}	G	United States	Phoenix Suns	Grand Canyon (Sr.)
7	146	Rowan Gomes^{#}	F	Antigua and Barbuda	Denver Nuggets	Hampton (Sr.)
7	147	Mike Giomi^{#}	F	United States	Seattle SuperSonics	NC State (Sr.)
7	148	Ervin Leavy^{#}	G	United States	Chicago Bulls	Central Michigan (Sr.)
7	149	Montel Hatcher^{#}	G	United States	Indiana Pacers	UCLA (Sr.)
7	150	Jamie Dixon^{#}	G	United States	Washington Bullets	TCU (Sr.)
7	151	Clarence Grier^{#}	F	United States	Houston Rockets	Campbell (Sr.)
7	152	Ronnie Leggette^{#}	G	United States	Golden State Warriors	West Virginia State (Sr.)
7	153	Keith Webster^{#}	G	United States	Utah Jazz	Harvard (Sr.)
7	154	Eric Semisch^{#}	F	United States	Philadelphia 76ers	West Virginia (Sr.)
7	155	Kenny Stone^{#}	F	United States	Portland Trail Blazers	George Fox (Sr.)
7	156	Curtis Hunter^{#}	F	United States	Denver Nuggets	North Carolina (Sr.)
7	157	Mark Gottfried^{#}	G	United States	Detroit Pistons	Alabama (Sr.)
7	158	Gerald White^{#}	G	United States	Dallas Mavericks	Auburn (Sr.)
7	159	Franjo Arapović^{#}	C	Yugoslavia	Atlanta Hawks	Cibona (Yugoslavia)
7	160	Gerry Corcoran^{#}	C	United States	Boston Celtics	Northeastern (Sr.)
7	161	Ron vanderSchaaf^{#}	F	Netherlands	Los Angeles Lakers	Central Washington (Sr.)

== Notable undrafted players ==
These players were not selected in the draft but still appeared in at least one regular or postseason NBA game.

Player	Position	Nationality	School/club team
Randy Allen	F	United States	Florida State (Sr.)
Sergei Bazarevich	SG	Soviet Union	CSKA Moscow (Soviet Union)
Scott Brooks	PG	United States	UC Irvine (Sr.)
Mike Champion	PF	United States	Gonzaga (Sr.)
Tom Copa	C	United States	Marquette (Sr.)
Radisav Ćurčić	C	Yugoslavia	Union Olimpija (Yugoslavia)
Andrew Gaze	F	Australia	Melbourne Tigers (Australia)
Cedric Hunter	PG	United States	Kansas (Sr.)
Mark Wade	PG	United States	UNLV (Sr.)
David Wood	F	United States	Nevada (Sr.)
A. J. Wynder	PG	United States	Fairfield (Sr.)

== Early entrants ==
=== College underclassmen ===
For the fifth year in a row and the ninth time in ten years, no college underclassman would withdraw their entry into the NBA draft. However, it would be the second year in a row that a player that qualified for the status of a "college underclassman" would be playing professional basketball overseas, as the Haitian born Olden Polynice (who had previously played for the University of Virginia for a year before travelling to Italy to play for the Hamby Rimini) would qualify as an official entry there. Not only that, but it would also be the first time in NBA history (second time if you include the 1973 entry of David Brent from the Carolina Cougars in the rivaling ABA after previously playing for Jacksonville University) that an underclassman would declare entry by playing in another American basketball league (in this case, Ricky Brown previously going from the University of South Alabama to the Pensacola Tornados of the Continental Basketball Association minor league) first before entering an NBA draft. If those two players get included into the list properly, the number of "college underclassmen" that would qualify for this year's draft would increase from seven to nine total players. Regardless, these following college basketball players successfully applied for early draft entrance.

- (United States) Vincent Askew – F, Memphis (junior)
- (United States) Norris Coleman – F, Kansas State (sophomore)
- (United States) Kenny Drummond – G, High Point (junior)
- (United States) Derrick McKey – F, Alabama (junior)
- (United States) Russell Pierre – F, Virginia Tech (junior)
- (United States) Reinhard Schmuck – F, Baruch (junior)
- (United States) Kevin Smith – F, Minnesota (junior)

=== Other eligible players ===
This would be the second year in a row that a player that previously played in college would enter the NBA draft as an underclassman (coincidentally also playing for an Italian basketball team while doing so). Not only that, but this would also be the second year in NBA history (third if you include David Brent's 1973 NBA draft entry while he was a part of the Carolina Cougars in the rivaling American Basketball Association) that an underclassman would enter the NBA draft by playing in another American basketball league (in this case, the Continental Basketball Association minor league) first; the first case happened in 1971 with Joe Hammond from the Allentown Jets in what was formerly called the Eastern Basketball Association. It was also the first year where a foreign-born player would qualify as an underclassman while also playing for an international team.

Player	Team	Note	Ref.
(United States) Ricky Brown	Pensacola Tornados (CBA)	Left South Alabama in 1986; playing professionally since the 1986–87 season	
(Haiti) Olden Polynice	Hamby Ramini (Italy)	Left Virginia in 1986; playing professionally since the 1986–87 season	

== Invited attendees ==
The 1987 NBA draft is considered to be the tenth NBA draft to have utilized what's properly considered the "green room" experience for NBA prospects. The NBA's green room is a staging area where anticipated draftees often sit with their families and representatives, waiting for their names to be called on draft night. Often being positioned either in front of or to the side of the podium (in this case, being positioned in the Madison Square Garden's Felt Forum for the sixth year in a row), once a player heard his name, he would walk to the podium to shake hands and take promotional photos with the NBA commissioner.

From there, the players often conducted interviews with various media outlets while backstage. However, once the NBA draft started to air nationally on TV starting with the 1980 NBA draft, the green room evolved from players waiting to hear their name called and then shaking hands with these select players who were often called to the hotel to take promotional pictures with the NBA commissioner a day or two after the draft concluded to having players in real-time waiting to hear their names called up and then shaking hands with David Stern, the NBA's commissioner at the time. The NBA compiled its list of green room invites through collective voting by the NBA's team presidents and general managers alike, which in this year's case belonged to only what they believed were the top 16 prospects at the time.

However, despite the large amount of invites this year when compared to previous years, there are many notable things about the listing that would still be in mind here, such as the absences of future Hall of Famers David Robinson and Reggie Miller and multi-time All-Star Kevin Johnson, the first foreign team player invite via Olden Polynice, and both Ron Moore and Andre Moore going into the second round. Even so, the following players were invited to attend this year's draft festivities live and in person.

- (United States) Cadillac Anderson – PF, Houston
- (United States) Muggsy Bogues – PG, Wake Forest
- (United States) Dallas Comegys – C, DePaul
- (United States) Tellis Frank – PF, Western Kentucky
- (United States) Armen Gilliam – PF, UNLV
- (United States) Horace Grant – PF/C, Clemson
- (United States) Dennis Hopson – SF, Ohio State
- (United States) Mark Jackson – PG, St. John's
- (United States) Derrick McKey – SF/PF, Alabama
- (United States) Andre Moore – PF, Loyola (IL)
- (United States) Ron Moore – C, West Virginia State
- (Puerto Rico) José Ortiz – PF, Oregon State
- (United States) Scottie Pippen – SF, Central Arkansas
- (Haiti) Olden Polynice – C, Hamby Rimini (Italy)
- (United States) Kenny Smith – PG, North Carolina
- (United States) Reggie Williams – SF, Georgetown

== See also ==
- List of first overall NBA draft picks
