= Paul Graham (basketball player) =

American basketball player (born 1967)

Personal information
- Born: November 28, 1967 (age 58) Philadelphia, Pennsylvania, U.S.
- Listed height: 6 ft 6 in (1.98 m)
- Listed weight: 200 lb (91 kg)

Career information
- High school: Benjamin Franklin (Philadelphia, Pennsylvania)
- College: Ohio (1985–1989)
- NBA draft: 1989: undrafted
- Playing career: 1990–2004
- Position: Small forward / shooting guard
- Number: 25

Career history
- 1990: Goldfields Giants
- 1990–1991: Albany Patroons
- 1991–1994: Atlanta Hawks
- 1994–1995: Rapid City Thrillers
- 1995–1997: Omaha Racers
- 1997: Mayagüez
- 1997–1998: Dijon
- 1998: Atlantic City Seagulls
- 1998–1999: Elitzur Givat Shmuel
- 1999–2000: Strasbourg IG
- 2000: San Carlos
- 2000–2001: Chalon
- 2001–2002: BK Skonto
- 2002: Pennsylvania ValleyDawgs
- 2004: Delaware Destroyers

Career highlights
- LNB Pro A All-Star (1998); MAC Player of the Year (1989); 2× First-team All-MAC (1988, 1989); MAC Freshman of the Year (1986); USBL All-Star Game MVP (1991)
- Stats at NBA.com
- Stats at Basketball Reference

Paul Graham (born November 28, 1967) is an American former professional basketball player. Graham played at Ben Franklin High School in Philadelphia PA., where he arrived after growing up in the 12th & Cumberland area. He played four years of college basketball for Ohio, where he averaged 19.7 points, 5.5 rebounds and 2.6 assists in 110 career games. As of 2026, he was the 6th All Time scorer in school history. Graham is also #6 all time at Ohio University in points per game in one season, averaging 22.2 ppg in the 1988-89 season.

After college, Graham moved to Australia in 1990 and joined the Goldfields Giants of the State Basketball League (SBL). He averaged 43.3 points in 10 games for the Giants and scored 82 points in his final game. As of 2003, it marked the equal highest single-game points total in SBL history.

Upon his return to America, Graham joined the Albany Patroons of the Continental Basketball Association for the 1990–91 season. Following this stint, he had a three-year run with the NBA's Atlanta Hawks from 1991 to 1994. In 179 games for the Hawks, he averaged 8.4 points, 2.4 rebounds, 2.0 assists and 1.0 steals in 18.7 minutes per game.

Between 1994 and 1997, Graham played in the Continental Basketball Association. From 1997, he embarked on an overseas career in places like Puerto Rico and France before returning to the U.S. in mid-1998. He later had stints in Israel, France, the Dominican Republic and Latvia before wrapping up his career with minor stints in the United States Basketball League and the Eastern Basketball Alliance.
