= Michael Adams (basketball) =

American basketball player and coach (born 1963)

Personal information
- Born: January 19, 1963 (age 63) Hartford, Connecticut, U.S.
- Listed height: 5 ft 10 in (1.78 m)
- Listed weight: 165 lb (75 kg)

Career information
- High school: Hartford Public (Hartford, Connecticut)
- College: Boston College (1981–1985)
- NBA draft: 1985: 3rd round, 66th overall pick
- Drafted by: Sacramento Kings
- Playing career: 1985–1996
- Position: Point guard
- Number: 10, 14, 23
- Coaching career: 1999–2010

Career history

Playing
- 1985: Springfield Fame
- 1985: Sacramento Kings
- 1985–1986: Bay State Bombardiers
- 1986: Springfield Fame
- 1986–1987: Washington Bullets
- 1987–1991: Denver Nuggets
- 1991–1994: Washington Bullets
- 1994–1996: Charlotte Hornets

Coaching
- 1999–2000: Richmond Rhythm (assistant)
- 2000–2002: Vancouver / Memphis Grizzlies (assistant)
- 2004: Washington Mystics
- 2005–2007: Maryland (assistant)
- 2009–2010: Archbishop Carroll HS

Career highlights
- NBA All-Star (1992); All-CBA Second Team (1986); CBA All-Defensive Second Team (1986); CBA Rookie of the Year (1986); USBL All-Star Game MVP (1985); 2× Second-team All-Big East (1984, 1985)

Career NBA statistics
- Points: 9,621 (14.7 ppg)
- Assists: 4,209 (6.4 apg)
- Steals: 1,081 (1.7 spg)
- Stats at NBA.com
- Stats at Basketball Reference

Michael Adams (born January 19, 1963) is an American former professional basketball player and coach. He played college basketball for the Boston College Eagles and was a third-round selection in the 1985 NBA draft by the Sacramento Kings. Adams played 11 seasons in the National Basketball Association (NBA) with the Kings, Washington Bullets, Denver Nuggets and Charlotte Hornets. He was an NBA All-Star with the Bullets in 1992.

== Professional career ==
After starring at Boston College, the 5'10" point guard was selected by the Sacramento Kings in the third round with the 66th pick of the 1985 NBA draft. He averaged only 2.2 points during his rookie season. He spent the 1985–86 season with the Bay State Bombardiers in the Continental Basketball Association (CBA). He was selected as the CBA Rookie of the Year and named to the all-league and all-defensive second teams.

In his second season, he played with the Washington Bullets, but Adams had his best season in 1990–1991, when he averaged 26.5 points (including a 54-point game in which made a career-high 9 3-pointers) and 10.5 assists per game while playing for the Denver Nuggets. After that breakout season, he rejoined the Bullets via a trade, during which time he appeared in his only NBA All-Star Game in 1992. In his first game back with the Bullets, he recorded a career-high 9 steals to go along with 23 points and 13 assists in a 109–103 win over the Indiana Pacers.

Renowned for his "push shot," Adams retired in 1996 when playing for the Charlotte Hornets with NBA career totals of 9,621 points and 4,209 assists, and was once among the all-time league leaders in three-point field goals made and attempted. Adams had a record 79 consecutive games with a 3-point field goal (January 28, 1988 – January 23, 1989). The record is now held by Stephen Curry.

== Coaching career ==
Adams has held coaching positions with the International Basketball League's Richmond Rhythm, the NBA's Vancouver Grizzlies, the WNBA's Washington Mystics, and the University of Maryland.

In 2010, Adams joined the St. Bonaventure Bonnies as an assistant coach but resigned after six weeks for family reasons.

== NBA career statistics ==
Legend
GP	Games played	GS	Games started	MPG	Minutes per game
FG%	Field goal percentage	3P%	3-point field goal percentage	FT%	Free throw percentage
RPG	Rebounds per game	APG	Assists per game	SPG	Steals per game
BPG	Blocks per game	PPG	Points per game	**Bold**	Career high

=== Regular season ===
Year	Team	GP	GS	MPG	FG%	3P%	FT%	RPG	APG	SPG	BPG	PPG
1985–86	Sacramento	18	0	7.7	.364	.000	.667	.3	1.2	.5	.1	2.2
1986–87	Washington	63	0	20.7	.407	.275	.847	2.0	3.9	1.3	.1	7.2
1987–88	Denver	**82**	75	33.9	.449	**.367**	.834	2.7	6.1	2.0	**.2**	13.9
1988–89	Denver	77	77	**36.2**	.433	.356	.819	3.7	6.4	**2.2**	.1	18.5
1989–90	Denver	79	74	34.1	.402	.366	.850	2.8	6.3	1.5	.0	15.5
1990–91	Denver	66	66	35.5	.394	.296	**.879**	3.9	**10.5**	**2.2**	.1	**26.5**
1991–92	Washington	78	**78**	35.8	.393	.324	.869	**4.0**	7.6	1.9	.1	18.1
1992–93	Washington	70	70	35.7	.439	.321	.856	3.4	7.5	1.4	.1	14.8
1993–94	Washington	70	67	33.4	.408	.288	.830	2.6	6.9	1.4	.1	12.1
1994–95	Charlotte	29	0	15.3	**.453**	.358	.833	1.0	3.3	.8	.0	6.5
1995–96	Charlotte	21	3	15.7	.446	.341	.743	1.0	3.2	1.0	**.2**	5.4
Career		653	510	31.3	.415	.332	.849	2.9	6.4	1.7	.1	14.7

=== Playoffs ===
Year	Team	GP	GS	MPG	FG%	3P%	FT%	RPG	APG	SPG	BPG	PPG
1987	Washington	3	–	27.3	.320	.222	.333	2.3	3.3	**2.3**	.0	6.3
1988	Denver	**11**	–	36.9	.362	.315	**.878**	3.3	5.8	1.6	**.2**	13.4
1989	Denver	2	–	**37.5**	**.417**	**.455**	.875	**8.5**	4.5	1.5	.0	**23.5**
1990	Denver	3	–	35.0	.382	.300	.875	2.0	**6.0**	1.3	.0	13.0
1995	Charlotte	1	0	11.0	.400	.000	.000	1.0	2.0	.0	.0	4.0
Career		20	–	34.0	.370	.327	.850	3.4	5.2	1.6	.1	12.8

== Head coaching record ==
=== WNBA ===
Legend
Regular season	G	Games coached	W	Games won	L	Games lost	W–L %	Win–loss %
Playoffs	PG	Playoff games	PW	Playoff wins	PL	Playoff losses	PW–L %	Playoff win–loss %

Team	Year	G	W	L	W–L%	Finish	PG	PW	PL	PW–L%	Result
WAS	2004	34	17	17	.500	4th in East	3	1	2	.333	Lost in Conference semifinals
Career		17	17	17	.500		3	1	2	.333	

== See also ==
- List of National Basketball Association players with 9 or more steals in a game
