= Muggsy Bogues =

American basketball player (born 1965)

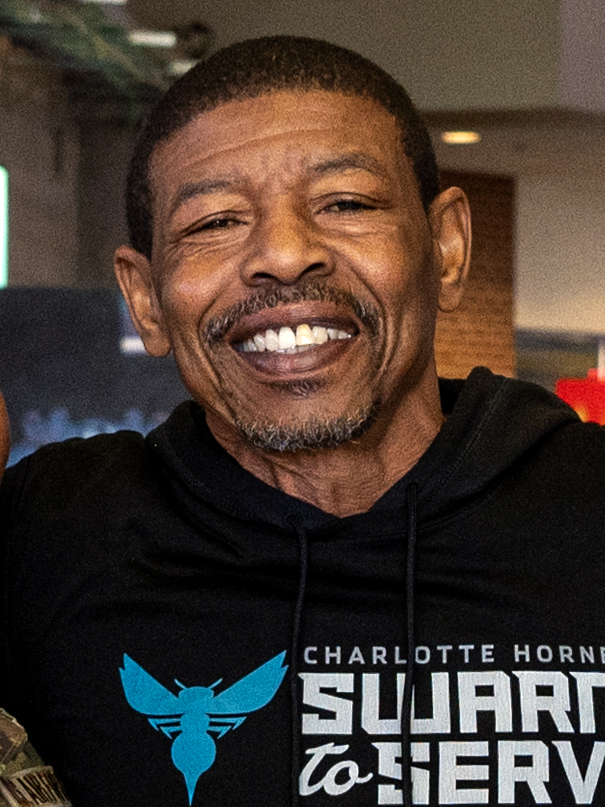
- Bogues in 2025

Personal information
- Born: January 9, 1965 (age 61) Baltimore, Maryland, U.S.
- Listed height: 5 ft 3 in (1.60 m)
- Listed weight: 136 lb (62 kg)

Career information
- High school: Paul Laurence Dunbar (Baltimore, Maryland)
- College: Wake Forest (1983–1987)
- NBA draft: 1987: 1st round, 12th overall pick
- Drafted by: Washington Bullets
- Playing career: 1987–2001
- Position: Point guard
- Number: 1, 14
- Coaching career: 2005–2014

Career history

Playing
- 1987: Rhode Island Gulls
- 1987–1988: Washington Bullets
- 1988–1997: Charlotte Hornets
- 1997–1999: Golden State Warriors
- 1999–2001: Toronto Raptors

Coaching
- 2005–2006: Charlotte Sting
- 2011–2014: United Faith Christian Academy

Career highlights
- USBL Rookie of the Year (1987); Frances Pomeroy Naismith Award (1987); First-team All-ACC (1987); No. 14 retired by Wake Forest Demon Deacons; MVP USBL All-Star Game (1987)

Career statistics
- Points: 6,858 (7.7 ppg)
- Assists: 6,726 (7.6 apg)
- Steals: 1,369 (1.5 spg)
- Stats at NBA.com
- Stats at Basketball Reference
Medals
Men's basketball
Representing United States
FIBA World Championship
Gold medal – first place	1986 Spain	National team

Tyrone Curtis "Muggsy" Bogues (born January 9, 1965) is an American former basketball player. The shortest player ever to play in the National Basketball Association (NBA), the 5 ft 3 in (1.60 m) Bogues played point guard for four teams during his 14-season career in the NBA. Best known for his 10 seasons with the Charlotte Hornets, he also played for the Washington Bullets, Golden State Warriors, and Toronto Raptors.

Bogues finished in the top seven in assists in six consecutive seasons (1989–1995), and in the top ten in steals in three of those seasons. He had 146 career NBA double-doubles. After his NBA career, he served as head coach of the now-defunct Charlotte Sting of the WNBA. Bogues also had a surprising defensive ability. He blocked 39 shots throughout his NBA career, including one from 7-foot-tall Patrick Ewing.

== Early life ==
Bogues was born in Baltimore, Maryland and grew up in the Lafayette Court housing projects. His mother Elaine was 4 ft 11 in (1.50 m) and his father Richard was 5 ft 5 in (1.65 m). He had three older siblings.

Bogues's childhood was troubled. At five years old, he was hit by stray buckshot in his neighborhood and had to be hospitalized. As a child, he witnessed a man get beaten to death with a baseball bat, a sight that haunted him into adulthood. When Bogues was 12 years old, his father was sentenced to twenty years in prison for armed robbery. Around the same time, his brother Chuckie began using hard drugs.

In addition to basketball, Bogues was a standout wrestler and baseball player growing up. As a child playing basketball on playgrounds, he was nicknamed "Muggsy" after a diminutive character from The Bowery Boys.

Bogues initially attended and played basketball at Southern High School in Baltimore. Because Bogues aspired to be a dental technician, he transferred to Baltimore's Dunbar High School which offered healthcare classes. At Dunbar, he was coached by Bob Wade, later the head coach at the University of Maryland. He was a teammate of future NBA players David Wingate, Reggie Williams, and Reggie Lewis (the latter two of whom were in his graduating class). The Dunbar Poets finished the 1981–82 season at 29–0 during Bogues's junior year and finished 31–0 during his senior year in 1982–83, and were ranked first in the nation by USA Today.

Bogues received scholarship offers to play college basketball for several schools including Virginia, Penn State and Seton Hall.

== College ==
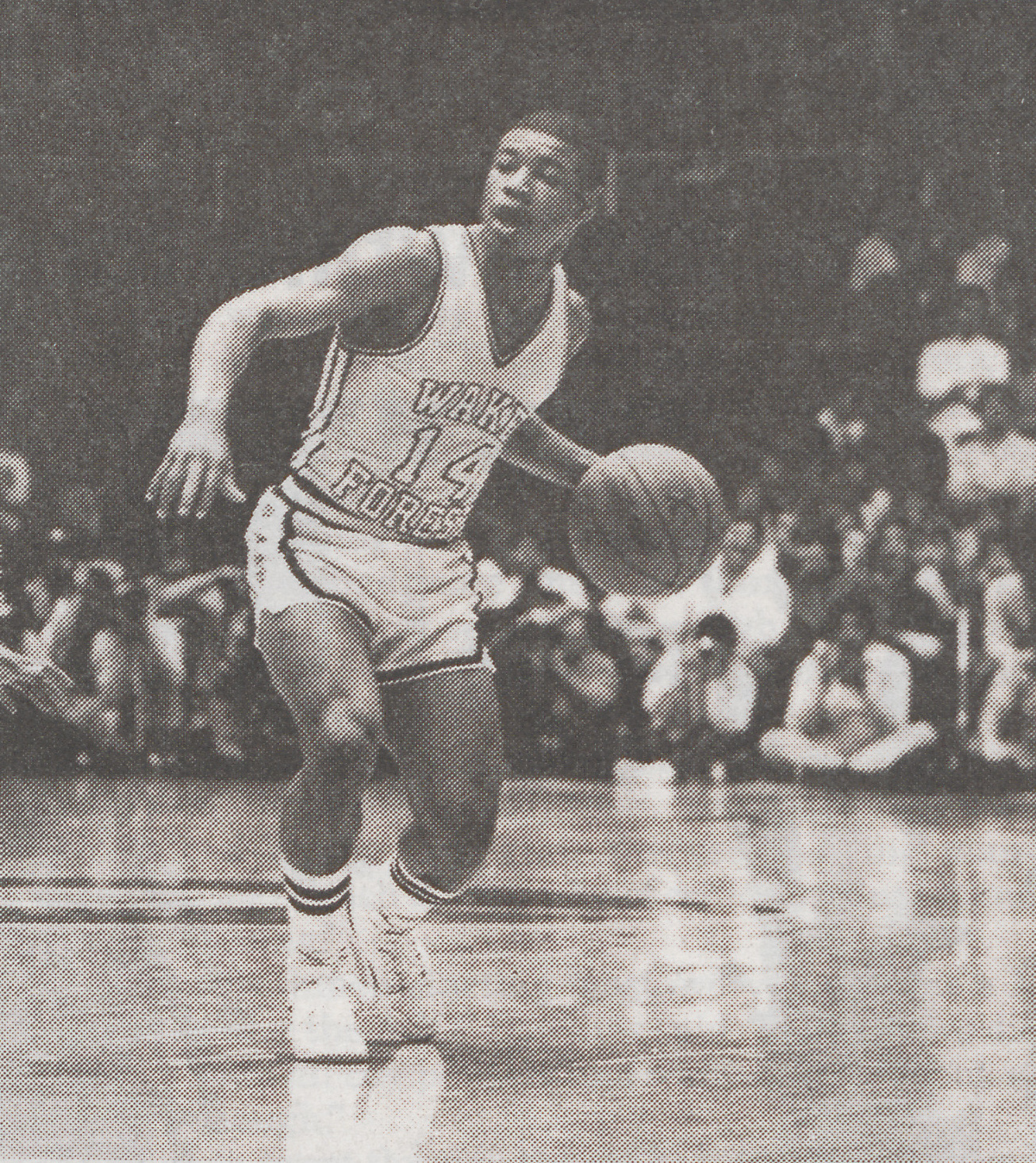
Bogues playing for the Wake Forest Demon Deacons

Bogues attended Wake Forest University and played college basketball for the Wake Forest Demon Deacons for four years. He averaged 11.3 points, 8.4 assists and 3.1 steals per game in his junior year. He followed with a senior campaign in which he averaged 14.8 points, 9.5 assists, 3.8 rebounds and 2.4 steals per game. In 1986–87, he led the Atlantic Coast Conference in steals and assists and received the Frances Pomeroy Naismith Award. As a senior, he received the Arnold Palmer Award as Wake Forest's most valuable athlete. When his collegiate career ended, he was the ACC career leader in steals and assists.

Wake Forest retired his number within a few years of his leaving the program. In 2001, he was inducted into the Wake Forest Sports Hall of Fame. As of 2021, he remains Wake Forest's all-time leader in both steals and assists.

Bogues played for the USA national team in the 1986 FIBA World Championship and won the gold medal. Under head coach Lute Olson, Bogues played in all ten of the team's games and led them in assists and steals.

== Professional career ==
=== Rhode Island Gulls (1987) ===
Bogues was selected second overall in the 1987 United States Basketball League draft by the Rhode Island Gulls. Bogues was a fan favorite in the USBL and the Gulls led the league in attendance. In his only season in the league, he averaged 22.2 points and 8.4 assists per game and led the league in minutes per game before an ankle injury ended his season.

=== Washington Bullets (1987–1988) ===
Bogues was drafted twelfth overall in the 1987 NBA draft by the Washington Bullets, and was part of a talent-laden draft class that also included David Robinson, Reggie Miller, Scottie Pippen, and Kevin Johnson. Bogues made his NBA debut on November 6, 1987, against the Atlanta Hawks at Omni Coliseum; he started and led the team in assists. At the time of his debut, he was 16.5 inches (42 cm) shorter than the average NBA player. In his rookie year, Bogues was a teammate of Manute Bol who stood 7 ft 7 in (2.31 m) tall. They were the tallest and shortest players in NBA history at the time, with 28 inches (71 cm) difference between them. Bol and Bogues appeared on three magazine covers together. Bogues's playing time dropped dramatically when coach Kevin Loughery was fired and replaced with Wes Unseld. On March 4, 1988, Bogues recorded seven steals (and scored 10 points) during a 95–88 win over the Indiana Pacers. Despite starting only fourteen games as a rookie, Bogues led the Bullets in both steals and assists.

=== Charlotte Hornets (1988–1997) ===
The following season, the Bullets left Bogues and Jay Murphy unprotected in the 1988 NBA expansion draft and he was selected by the Charlotte Hornets. Bogues told the Washington Post that he had "no quarrel" with the Bullets for leaving him unprotected and his agents reported that he was excited to start anew in Charlotte.

In Charlotte's first season, head coach Dick Harter confined Bogues to the bench, preferring to use him to provide short bursts of energy as a substitute. Harter was fired during the following season and Bogues began to flourish in the up-tempo offenses run by his successors, Gene Littles and Allan Bristow. Bogues went on to play parts of ten seasons with the Hornets, spending the vast majority of his time as a starter and becoming one of the faces of the Hornets alongside Alonzo Mourning and Larry Johnson.

During his time in Charlotte, the Hornets rose from mediocrity to a serious contender; Bogues three times led the team to the playoffs. During this time, Bogues was wildly popular among basketball fans, as were the Hornets. In all six seasons between 1989 and 1995, he finished in the top ten in the league in assists, only once finishing worse than fourth. In 1992–93, Bogues had the NBA's best assist-to-turnover ratio. One of his best seasons came in 1993–94 when he averaged a double-double, including a second-place finish in assists per game. In the 1994–95 season, he set a career high with 10.8 points per game. However, in August 1995, after six consecutive seasons of an increasing scoring average, he underwent arthroscopic surgery on his left knee. The recovery and repeated setbacks saw him placed on the injured list at least three separate times in the 1995–96 season. He finished the season with only fourteen points in six games. Bogues returned to action in earnest the following season but missed 17 games and his production had dropped off slightly across the board.

Bogues's relationship with the team soured considerably in 1997. In June, coach Dave Cowens suggested that Bogues should consider retiring due to his nagging knee injury. Only a week later, the Hornets signed point guard David Wesley, his presumptive replacement. In August, owner George Shinn assured Bogues that he would be able to finish his playing career with the team. However, the team later requested that he undergo a preseason MRI on his injured knee. On November 7, Bogues was traded, along with Tony Delk, to the Golden State Warriors in exchange for B. J. Armstrong. At the time, he was the NBA's all-time leader in assist-to-turnover ratio and the franchise leader in steals and assists. After the trade, he severed ties with the organization. The trade made Dell Curry, Bogues' closest friend on the team, the last remaining original member of the Hornets.

=== Golden State Warriors (1997–1999) ===
Bogues led the Warriors in assists in the 1997–98 season despite starting in fewer than half of the team's games. He appeared in 36 games in the lockout-shortened following season, missing time due to hamstring and knee injuries as well as chickenpox.

=== Toronto Raptors (1999–2001) ===
Prior to the 1999–2000 season, Bogues signed with the Toronto Raptors for the veterans' minimum, reuniting him with longtime teammate Dell Curry. With the Raptors in 1999–2000, he played 80 games in a season for the first time since 1992–93, though he started in only five of those games. At 35 years old on March 3, 2000, he tied a career high with 24 points in a victory over the Boston Celtics.

Due to his chronic knee injury, Bogues appeared in only three games in the 2000–01 season, which would be his final. His last game came on January 27, 2001, against the Chicago Bulls, a scoreless outing. On February 22, 2001, he was traded with Mark Jackson to the New York Knicks for Chris Childs and a 2002 first round draft pick. He was included in the trade for salary cap reasons and never reported to New York during his stint with them. At the end of the last season in which he played, Bogues ranked twelfth all-time in assists and thirteenth all-time in assists per game in NBA history.

On August 10, 2001, Bogues was traded to the Dallas Mavericks in a three-team deal involving Shandon Anderson, Howard Eisley and Glen Rice. He told the team that he intended to step away from basketball to care for his mother who was fighting cancer. New Mavericks owner Mark Cuban decided to waive Bogues and fully guarantee the remaining three years on his contract; had he retired before being waived, he would not have been owed any money.

In July 2002, after his mother's death, Bogues told The Baltimore Sun that he was hoping to play again.

== Career statistics ==
Legend
GP	Games played	GS	Games started	MPG	Minutes per game
FG%	Field goal percentage	3P%	3-point field goal percentage	FT%	Free throw percentage
RPG	Rebounds per game	APG	Assists per game	SPG	Steals per game
BPG	Blocks per game	PPG	Points per game	**Bold**	Career high

=== College ===
Year	Team	GP	GS	MPG	FG%	3P%	FT%	RPG	APG	SPG	BPG	PPG
1983–84	Wake Forest	**32**	0	9.8	.304	–	.692	.7	1.7	1.0	–	1.2
1984–85	Wake Forest	29	28	35.3	**.500**	–	.682	2.4	7.1	2.9	–	6.6
1985–86	Wake Forest	29	**29**	38.0	.455	–	.730	3.1	8.4	**3.1**	**.1**	11.3
1986–87	Wake Forest	29	**29**	**39.0**	**.500**	**.443**	**.806**	**3.8**	**9.5**	2.4	.0	**14.8**
Career		119	86	30.0	.473	.443	.749	2.4	6.6	2.3	.0	8.3

=== NBA ===
==== Regular season ====
Year	Team	GP	GS	MPG	FG%	3P%	FT%	RPG	APG	SPG	BPG	PPG
1987–88	Washington	79	14	20.6	.390	.188	.784	1.7	5.1	1.6	.0	5.0
1988–89	Charlotte	79	21	22.2	.426	.077	.750	2.1	7.8	1.4	**.1**	5.4
1989–90	Charlotte	81	65	33.9	.491	.192	.791	2.6	**10.7**	2.0	.0	9.4
1990–91	Charlotte	81	46	28.4	.460	.000	.796	2.7	8.3	1.7	.0	7.0
1991–92	Charlotte	**82**	69	34.0	.472	.074	.783	2.9	9.1	**2.1**	**.1**	8.9
1992–93	Charlotte	**82**	**80**	35.0	.453	.231	.833	3.7	8.8	2.0	**.1**	10.0
1993–94	Charlotte	77	77	**35.7**	.471	.167	.806	**4.1**	**10.7**	1.7	.0	10.8
1994–95	Charlotte	78	78	33.7	.477	.200	.889	3.3	8.7	1.3	.0	**11.1**
1995–96	Charlotte	6	0	12.8	.375	.000	**1.000**	1.2	3.2	.3	.0	2.3
1996–97	Charlotte	65	65	28.9	.400	**.417**	.844	2.2	7.2	1.3	.0	8.0
1997–98	Charlotte	2	0	8.0	.400	—	**1.000**	.5	2.0	1.0	.0	3.0
1997–98	Golden State	59	31	26.3	.437	.250	.894	2.2	5.5	1.1	**.1**	5.8
1998–99	Golden State	36	5	19.8	**.494**	.000	.861	2.0	3.7	1.2	.0	5.1
1999–00	Toronto	80	5	21.6	.439	.333	.908	1.7	3.7	.8	**.1**	5.1
2000–01	Toronto	3	0	11.3	.000	.000	—	1.0	1.7	.7	.0	0.0
Career		889	556	28.6	.458	.278	.827	2.6	7.6	1.6	.0	7.7

==== Playoffs ====
Year	Team	GP	GS	MPG	FG%	3P%	FT%	RPG	APG	SPG	BPG	PPG
1988	Washington	1	0	2.0	—	—	—	.0	2.0	.0	.0	0.0
1993	Charlotte	**9**	**9**	**38.4**	.476	.000	.714	**4.0**	**7.8**	**2.7**	.0	9.8
1995	Charlotte	4	4	36.3	.311	.333	**1.000**	1.5	6.3	1.0	.0	8.5
1997	Charlotte	2	2	29.0	**.579**	**.857**	**1.000**	1.5	2.5	.5	.0	**16.0**
2000	Toronto	3	2	29.0	.286	.333	.333	2.0	1.7	1.3	.0	5.3
Career		19	17	33.6	.419	.476	.769	2.7	5.6	1.7	.0	8.9

== Career after the NBA ==
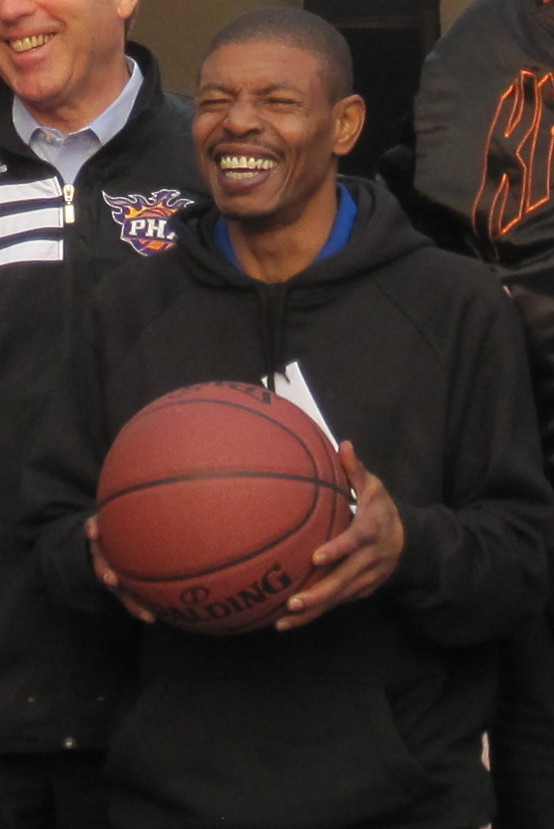
Bogues in Delhi in 2012

His autobiography, In the Land of Giants, was released in 1994 and recounts the struggles of growing up in inner-city Baltimore and achieving success in the NBA.

After leaving the NBA, Bogues worked in the real estate business until August 3, 2005, when he was named head coach of the Charlotte Sting in the Women's National Basketball Association, despite a lack of coaching experience. He was shorter than all of his players—at 5 ft 6 in (1.68 m), Helen Darling was the shortest Sting player. Bogues led the Sting to a 14–30 record before the team folded in January 2007.

In 2011, he became the head coach of United Faith Christian Academy boys' high school basketball team in Charlotte, North Carolina, after serving as an assistant to former head coach Shaun Wiseman. The school produced six all-state players during his three seasons as head coach. Despite being offered a new contract, he stepped down in 2014 to pursue other opportunities.

On March 18, 2014, Bogues was named the Charlotte Hornets' Ambassador, participating in the team's rebranding.

In 2018, Bogues invested in Ash & Erie, a clothing company for short men, after watching an episode of Shark Tank and reaching out to Shark Tank panelist Mark Cuban who had also invested in the company.

In January 2020, Bogues was announced as an inductee to the North Carolina Sports Hall of Fame.

Bogues founded the Muggsy Bogues Family Foundation, a 501(c)(3) organization "organized to assist vocationally bound students with scholarships and develop community outreach programs for at-risk families that address the most basic necessities" and "encourage youth and families by providing resources that emphasize stability and empower youth and families to reach their full potential, becoming well rounded students and productive adult citizens."

== Head coaching record ==
Team	Year	G	W	L	W–L%	Finish	PG	PW	PL	PW–L%	Result
Charlotte	2005	10	3	7	.300	6th in Eastern	—	—	—	—	Missed playoffs
Charlotte	2006	34	11	23	.324	6th in Eastern	—	—	—	—	Missed playoffs
Career		44	14	30	.318		—	—	—	—	

== Personal life ==
Bogues met his wife, Kim, in 1984 at a Dunbar High School alumni game. They had a daughter, Brittney, in 1987, were married in 1989 and had a son, Ty, in 1991. Bogues also had a daughter named Tyisha from an earlier relationship when he was 17 years old. Bogues and his wife separated in 1995 and divorced in 1997 with Kim retaining physical custody of their children.

Bogues met Sharon Smith at Dell Curry's retirement party in 2003 and the couple dated for five years before Smith died of breast cancer in July 2008.

Bogues remarried his ex-wife, Kim, in 2015.

On June 21, 1991, Bogues and Hornets teammate Dell Curry appeared in a Minor League Baseball game for the Gastonia Rangers of the South Atlantic League. George Shinn, as owner of both teams, arranged the publicity stunt. Bogues and Curry were scheduled to play the entire nine-inning game but it was shortened by rain. Bogues played second base and was hitless in both of his at bats.

In August 1993, Bogues's father died in Baltimore of pneumonia. He had been released early from prison but had resumed using drugs, often with Bogues's brother, Chuckie.

In 1995, Bogues moved his oldest brother, Chuckie, into his home to help him battle drug addiction while Bogues himself rehabbed from knee surgery. As of February 2019, Chuckie was still living with Bogues and had not used hard drugs in 23 years.

When Bogues left Wake Forest in 1987, he was 19 credits short of a degree. In 1996, he returned to Wake Forest to take summer courses to complete his degree. He finished his classes by correspondence and received a Bachelor of Arts in Speech Communications in May 1998.

Bogues's sister, Sherron, worked for the Baltimore Department of Recreation and Parks for 32 years until her death from cancer at age 55 in 2015. Baltimore Mayor Stephanie Rawlings-Blake named June 27 "Sherron Bogues Day" in her honor.

Bogues's grandson, Samartine, is a youth basketball player who received media attention for his play while still in elementary school and received his first college basketball scholarship offer in 2020 while still a high school freshman.

== Television and movie appearances ==
Bogues appeared in the movie Space Jam, as one of five NBA players (along with Charles Barkley, Shawn Bradley, Larry Johnson, and Patrick Ewing) whose playing ability is stolen by the villainous Monstars.

He had a cameo appearance in the movie Juwanna Mann.

Bogues made a cameo appearance in TV series Curb Your Enthusiasm as himself, sharing a restroom with Larry David and Richard Lewis and nearly having an altercation with David after catching them looking at his penis while urinating.

In 1996, Bogues had a cameo at the end of Eddie in which Whoopi Goldberg's character flirts with him. He then walks out onto the court to support her character preventing Wild Bill from moving the Knicks.

He made a cameo appearance on an episode of Saturday Night Live with Charles Barkley hosting and Nirvana the musical guest.

He also appeared in an episode of Hang Time where he spoke against steroids.

Bogues appeared in "Rebound", the first episode of season 7 of Royal Pains, in which he attended a welcoming party hosted by Ms. "New Parts" Newberg.

Bogues was interviewed for Baltimore Boys, an ESPN 30 for 30 documentary that highlighted the Dunbar Poets high school basketball team.

=== Advertisements ===
Although Bogues has appeared in several television advertisements, he avoided advertisements which focused on his small stature, at least during his career. During his career, Bogues appeared in commercials for Sprite, AT&T, First Union National Bank, Bojangles and Hyundai among others. In 1995, both he and his mother appeared in commercials for Reebok in a campaign featuring NBA players and their mothers. In 2002, he appeared in IBM commercials. In 2014, he appeared as a Christmas elf in a commercial for NBA 2K15. In 2016, he appeared in an ad for Axe. In 2019, Bogues appeared in a series of commercials for the web hosting company GoDaddy. In 2022, he appeared in a commercial for Caesars Entertainment.

== See also ==
- List of shortest players in NBA history
- List of NBA career assists leaders

Preceded by Trudi Lacey	Head coach of the Charlotte Sting; 2005–2007	Succeeded by None (franchise folded)
