= Michael Brooks (basketball) =

American basketball player (1958–2016)

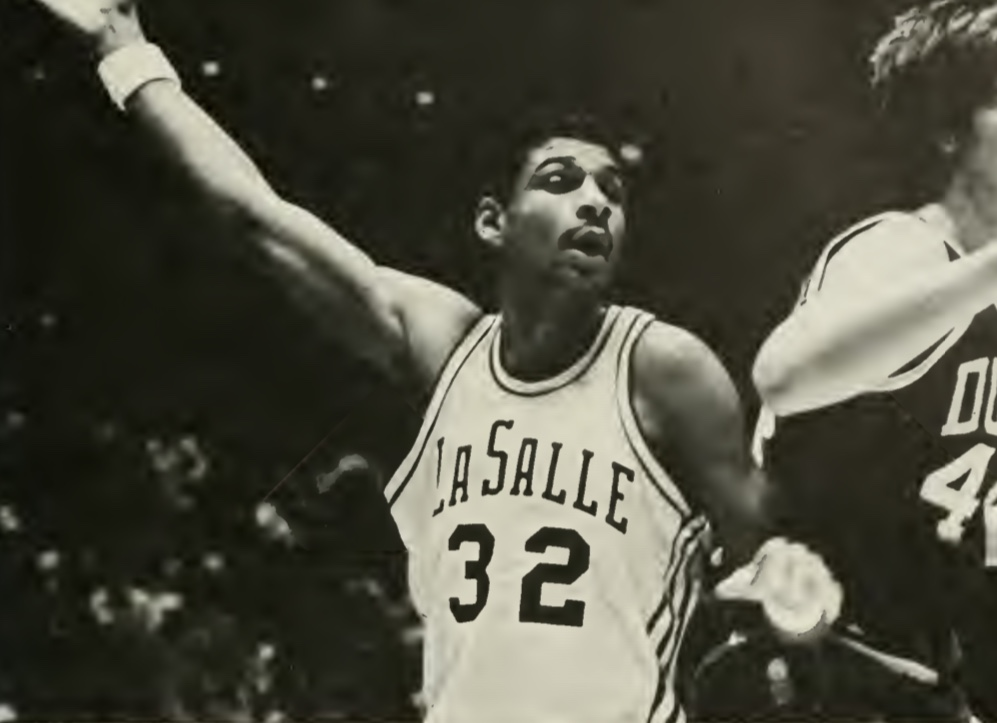
- Brooks as a sophomore at La Salle

Personal information
- Born: August 17, 1958 Philadelphia, Pennsylvania, U.S.
- Died: August 22, 2016 (aged 58) Étoy, Switzerland
- Listed height: 6 ft 7 in (2.01 m)
- Listed weight: 220 lb (100 kg)

Career information
- High school: West Philadelphia Catholic (Philadelphia, Pennsylvania)
- College: La Salle (1976–1980)
- NBA draft: 1980: 1st round, 9th overall pick
- Drafted by: San Diego Clippers
- Playing career: 1980–1996
- Position: Small forward
- Number: 7, 35

Career history
- 1980–1984: San Diego Clippers
- 1987: Indiana Pacers
- 1987–1988: Philadelphia Aces
- 1987–1988: Albany Patroons
- 1988: Denver Nuggets
- 1988–1992: Limoges
- 1992–1995: Levallois
- 1995–1996: Strasbourg IG
- 2006–2008: Chêne

Career highlights
- 2x French League Champion (1989, 1990); 2× French League Foreign MVP (1991, 1992); CBA Most Valuable Player (1988); CBA All-Star (1988); CBA All-Star Game MVP (1988); 1x USBL All-Star Game (1987); All-CBA First Team (1988); CBA All-Defensive Team (1988); CBA rebounding leader (1988); NABC Player of the Year (1980); Consensus first-team All-American (1980); 2× Robert V. Geasey Trophy winner (1978, 1980); 3× ECC Player of the Year (1978–1980); No. 32 retired by La Salle Explorers

Career NBA statistics
- Points: 4,086 (12.8 ppg)
- Rebounds: 2,001 (6.3 rpg)
- Assists: 818 (2.6 apg)
- Stats at NBA.com
- Stats at Basketball Reference
Medals
Representing United States
Men's basketball
Pan American Games
Gold medal – first place	1979 San Juan

Michael Anthony Brooks (August 17, 1958 – August 22, 2016) was an American professional basketball player. He also held French nationality. At 6 feet 7 inches (2.01 m), he played as a forward.

== College career ==
At La Salle University, Brooks racked up 2,628 points and 1,372 rebounds as an Explorer, leading La Salle to the NCAA Tournament in 1978 and 1980 and earning Big 5 MVP honors during those same years. He was named College Player of the Year in 1980. He is currently the 28th leading scorer in the history of the NCAA. He was inducted into the La Salle Hall of Athletes in 1985 and the Big 5 Hall of Fame in 1986.

== Professional career ==
=== NBA ===
Brooks was selected by the San Diego Clippers with the 9th overall pick of the 1980 NBA draft. In the NBA, Brooks played for the Clippers (1980–84), Indiana Pacers (1986–87) and Denver Nuggets (1987–88) in 319 games over six seasons. Brooks suffered a leg injury that kept him from playing for two years from 1984 to 1986.

=== CBA ===
Brooks played in the Continental Basketball Association (CBA) for the Albany Patroons from 1986 to 1988. He was selected as the CBA Most Valuable Player and named to the All-CBA First Team and All-Defensive Team in 1988. Brooks also appeared in the 1988 CBA All-Star Game where he was selected as Most Valuable Player.

=== France ===
He played in France for Limoges CSP from 1988 to 1992, winning the French national championship in 1989 and 1990. He was named Foreign Player MVP of the French league in 1991 and 1992. After leaving Limoges, Brooks had stints with other French teams, Levallois and Strasbourg. His best stats in the French league came in the 1990–91 season, when he averaged 21.4 points and 10.3 rebounds a game for Limoges.

== National team career ==
Brooks played with Team USA at the Pan American Games's 1979 tournament. Brooks was chosen to be the team captain of the USA's 1980 Summer Olympics team, but he was unable to compete, due to the 1980 Summer Olympics boycott. In 2007, he received one of 461 Congressional Gold Medals, created especially for the spurned athletes.

== Personal life ==
Brooks moved to Switzerland in 2005, where he worked as a basketball coach.

He had five children – Michael Johnson-Brooks, Athena Brooks, Julien Brooks, Jasper Brooks, and Sacha Brooks. He died on August 22, 2016, at the age of 58, after suffering a massive stroke. Brooks was also survived by his mother and two younger sisters.

== Career statistics ==
Legend
GP	Games played	GS	Games started	MPG	Minutes per game
FG%	Field goal percentage	3P%	3-point field goal percentage	FT%	Free throw percentage
RPG	Rebounds per game	APG	Assists per game	SPG	Steals per game
BPG	Blocks per game	PPG	Points per game	**Bold**	Career high

=== NBA ===
==== Regular season ====
Year	Team	GP	GS	MPG	FG%	3P%	FT%	RPG	APG	SPG	BPG	PPG
1980–81	San Diego	**82**		30.2	.479	.000	.706	5.4	2.5	1.2	.4	14.7
1981–82	San Diego	**82**	**73**	**33.5**	**.504**	.000	**.757**	**7.6**	2.9	**1.4**	**.5**	**15.6**
1982–83	San Diego	**82**	26	30.0	.484	**.333**	.697	6.4	**3.2**	**1.4**	**.5**	12.2
1983–84	San Diego	47	30	29.9	.479	.000	.689	7.3	1.9	1.1	.3	11.3
1986–87	Indiana	10	0	14.8	.351	–	.700	2.8	1.1	.9	.0	3.3
1987–88	Denver	16	0	8.3	.408	–	.750	2.8	.8	.3	.1	2.7
Career		319	129	29.4	.486	.152	.714	6.3	2.6	1.2	.4	12.8

==== Playoffs ====
Year	Team	GP	GS	MPG	FG%	3P%	FT%	RPG	APG	SPG	BPG	PPG
1988	Denver	4	0	2.8	.333	.500	–	1.0	.5	.0	.0	.8

== See also ==
- List of NCAA Division I men's basketball players with 2000 points and 1000 rebounds
