= Richard Rellford =

American basketball player (born 1964)

Personal information
- Born: February 16, 1964 (age 62) Riviera Beach, Florida, U.S.
- Listed height: 6 ft 7 in (2.01 m)
- Listed weight: 229 lb (104 kg)

Career information
- High school: Suncoast (Riviera Beach, Florida)
- College: Michigan (1982–1986)
- NBA draft: 1986: 5th round, 95th overall pick
- Drafted by: Indiana Pacers
- Playing career: 1986–2000
- Position: Power forward
- Number: 42

Career history
- 1986–1987: Rapid City Thrillers
- 1987: Rockford Lightning
- 1987: West Palm Beach Stingrays
- 1987–1988: Rockford Lightning
- 1988: San Antonio Spurs
- 1988: Wyoming Wildcatters
- 1988: West Palm Beach Stingrays
- 1988–1989: Maccabi Rishon LeZion
- 1990: AEK Athens
- 1990–1991: CB Girona
- 1991–1992: Sioux Falls Skyforce
- 1992: CB Canarias
- 1992–1993: AO Dafni
- 1993–1994: Hapoel Holon
- 1994–1995: Pagrati
- 1995–1996: Irakleio
- 1997: Quad City Thunder
- 1997–1998: AEL Limassol
- 1998–1999: Omonia Nicosia
- 1999–2000: Peñarol de Mar del Plata
- 2000: Regatas San Nicolás

Career highlights
- Greek League Top Scorer (1993); 2× Greek League All-Star (1994 II, 1996 I); First-team Parade All-American (1982); McDonald's All-American (1982)
- Stats at NBA.com
- Stats at Basketball Reference

Richard Allen Rellford (born February 16, 1964) is an American former professional basketball player. Born in Riviera Beach, Florida, he was a 6-foot-6-inch (1.98 m), 230-pound (100 kg) power forward. He played four games in the National Basketball Association (NBA), and three seasons in the Israeli Basketball Premier League.

== College career ==
Rellford played college basketball for the Michigan Wolverines.

== Professional career ==
Rellford was selected with the second pick of the fifth round in the 1986 NBA draft by the Indiana Pacers. He played for the San Antonio Spurs for 4 games in 1987–88, averaging 4.0 points and 1.8 rebounds per contest.

He played three seasons in the Israeli Basketball Premier League. In 1989–90 he averaged 26.6 points per game in the league and averaged 9.2 rebounds per game.

== Career statistics ==
Legend
GP	Games played	GS	Games started	MPG	Minutes per game
FG%	Field goal percentage	3P%	3-point field goal percentage	FT%	Free throw percentage
RPG	Rebounds per game	APG	Assists per game	SPG	Steals per game
BPG	Blocks per game	PPG	Points per game	**Bold**	Career high

=== NBA ===
==== Regular season ====
Year	Team	GP	GS	MPG	FG%	3P%	FT%	RPG	APG	SPG	BPG	PPG
1987–88	San Antonio	4	0	10.5	.625	–	.750	1.8	.3	.0	.8	4.0
