= Rhode Island Gulls =

- League: USBL
- Founded: 1985
- Dissolved: 1987
- Arena: Community College of Rhode Island, Warwick, RI
- Location: Warwick, Rhode Island
- Team colors: white, blue

The Rhode Island Gulls were a team in the United States Basketball League (USBL) based in Warwick, Rhode Island, during the 1985 and 1987 seasons.

== 1985 season ==
In what was the USBL's inaugural season, the Gulls finished fourth in the seven-team circuit with a 11-14 record. No playoffs were held, and the Springfield Fame were declared USBL champions. The Gulls featured 7-foot-7 Manute Bol and 5-foot-7 Spud Webb; the two future NBA stars were often on the court together. Their difference in height (24 inches) is believed to be one of the largest between two teammates in pro basketball history.

John Williams, who later played in the NBA with the Washington Bullets, was named the USBL's Rookie of the Year; he and Bol were also named to the league's All-Star team.

== 1987 season ==
The Gulls folded at the end of the 1985 season, but a new team in Rhode Island joined the USBL in 1987. In the USBL draft, the Gulls drafted 5-foot-3 Muggsy Bogues second overall. Bogues was named the league's Rookie of the Year, averaging 22.2 points and 8.4 assists per game and leading the league in minutes per game before an ankle injury ended his season. (Hank McDowell was also named to the USBL's second All-Star squad.) The Gulls finished third in the eight-team league with a 17-13 record, then defeated Philadelphia and Long Island in the playoffs to qualify for the USBL championship game. The Miami Tropics (led by former NBA All-Star World B. Free's 30 points) beat the Gulls, 103-99, in what would prove to be Rhode Island's last game; despite leading the USBL in attendance, the team disbanded again, this time for good.
