= Norris Coleman =

American basketball player (born 1961)

Personal information
- Born: September 27, 1961 (age 65) Jacksonville, Florida, U.S.
- Listed height: 6 ft 8 in (2.03 m)
- Listed weight: 210 lb (95 kg)

Career information
- High school: Paxon (Jacksonville, Florida)
- College: Kansas State (1985–1987)
- NBA draft: 1987: 2nd round, 38th overall pick
- Drafted by: Los Angeles Clippers
- Playing career: 1987–2001
- Position: Small forward / power forward
- Number: 45

Career history
- 1987–1988: Los Angeles Clippers
- 1987–1988: Pensacola Tornados
- 1988–1989: Olympique d'Antibes
- 1989–1990: S.A. Ramat Hasharon
- 1990–1991: Caja Madrid
- 1991–1992: CB Gran Canaria
- 1992–1994: Hapoel Jerusalem
- 1994–1995: Maccabi Tel Aviv
- 1995–1996: Hapoel Jerusalem
- 1996–1997: Peñarol Mar del Plata
- 1997–1998: Maccabi Ramat Gan
- 1998–1999: Maccabi Givat Shmuel
- 1999: Bnei Herzliya
- 2000–2001: Hapoel Tel Aviv

Career highlights
- Israeli League MVP (1994); 4x USBL All-Star (1987, 1988, 1991, 1992); 2× First-team All-Big Eight (1986, 1987); Big Eight Newcomer of the Year (1986)
- Stats at NBA.com
- Stats at Basketball Reference

Norris James Coleman (born September 27, 1961) is an American former professional basketball player who was selected by the Los Angeles Clippers in the second round (38th pick overall) of the 1987 NBA draft. A 6'8" forward from Kansas State University, Coleman played in only one National Basketball Association (NBA) season.

Coleman played for the Clippers during the 1987–88 season, appearing in 29 games and scoring a total of 153 points. Following his one season in the NBA, Coleman had a lengthy and successful career in foreign professional basketball leagues, principally in Israel. He played with Hapoel Jerusalem during the 1992–93, 1993–94, and 1995–96 seasons, and with Maccabi Tel Aviv during the 1994–95 season. He was the 1994 Israeli Basketball Premier League MVP. Coleman continued to play in Israel in numerous teams until his retirement in 2001, with Hapoel Tel Aviv in the second league, at the age of 40.

== College career ==
Coleman had an unusual collegiate career at Kansas State. Because he had spent five years in the U.S. Army, Coleman was a 24-year-old freshman when he began play at K-State in the 1985–86 basketball season. That season, Coleman led the Big Eight Conference in scoring with 21.8 points per game and pulled down 8 rebounds a game, on the way to being named first-team All-Conference and Newcomer of the Year. In doing so, he became one of the few players to lead his league in scoring during his first season in college. However, near the close of that season, the NCAA found that Coleman had not met the minimum high school requirements and K-State immediately declared him ineligible.

The saga took another twist in April 1986, when the NCAA issued an unusual ruling that said Coleman would have to sit out a year at K-State with no scholarship and surrender a year of eligibility, or transfer to a different school and face no penalties. Coleman immediately received scholarship offers from 25 schools, and took recruiting trips to LSU, the University of Kentucky and the University of Virginia, but eventually decided to stay at Kansas State. Early in the following basketball season, in November 1986, the NCAA reduced its penalty to a 12-game suspension, and Coleman returned to the court for the last 19 games of the 1986–1987 season, teaming with Mitch Richmond to help lead K-State to a berth in the 1987 NCAA tournament. After averaging 20.7 points per game and 8.4 rebounds per game and again being named first team All-Conference in his shortened sophomore season, Coleman decided to turn pro.

Because of his career in the Army, Coleman was affectionately nicknamed "The Sarge" by Kansas State fans.

== Career statistics ==
Legend
GP	Games played	GS	Games started	MPG	Minutes per game
FG%	Field goal percentage	3P%	3-point field goal percentage	FT%	Free throw percentage
RPG	Rebounds per game	APG	Assists per game	SPG	Steals per game
BPG	Blocks per game	PPG	Points per game	**Bold**	Career high

=== NBA ===
==== Regular season ====
Year	Team	GP	GS	MPG	FG%	3P%	FT%	RPG	APG	SPG	BPG	PPG
1987–88	L.A. Clippers	29	11	14.9	.346	.500	.556	2.8	.4	.4	.2	5.3

=== College ===
Year	Team	GP	GS	MPG	FG%	3P%	FT%	RPG	APG	SPG	BPG	PPG
1985–86	Kansas State	**28**	**28**	**35.4**	**.518**		.743	8.0	**.7**	**.9**	.9	**21.8**
1986–87	Kansas State	19	12	32.3	.508	.077	**.752**	**8.4**	.4	**.9**	**1.4**	20.7
**Career**		47	40	34.2	.515	.077	.747	8.2	.6	.9	1.2	21.3
