= Tracy Moore (basketball) =

American basketball player (born 1965)

Personal information
- Born: December 28, 1965 (age 60) Oklahoma City, Oklahoma, U.S.
- Listed height: 6 ft 4 in (1.93 m)
- Listed weight: 200 lb (91 kg)

Career information
- High school: John Marshall (Oklahoma City, Oklahoma)
- College: Tulsa (1984–1988)
- NBA draft: 1988: undrafted
- Playing career: 1988–2001
- Position: Shooting guard / small forward
- Number: 20, 23, 9

Career history
- 1988–1989: Tulsa Fast Breakers
- 1989–1990: Columbus Horizon
- 1990: Quad City Thunder
- 1990–1991: Tulsa Fast Breakers
- 1991: Florida Jades
- 1991–1992: Tulsa Zone
- 1992–1993: Dallas Mavericks
- 1993: Fargo Fever
- 1993: Detroit Pistons
- 1993–1994: La Crosse Catbirds
- 1994–1995: Pittsburgh Piranhas
- 1995–1996: Shreveport Storm
- 1997–1997: Houston Rockets
- 1997–1998: La Crosse Bobcats
- 1998–2000: Reggiana
- 2000–2001: Iraklio

Career highlights
- CBA champion (1989); CBA scoring champion (1996); 3× First-team All-MVC (1986–1988)
- Stats at NBA.com
- Stats at Basketball Reference

Tracy Lamont Moore (born December 28, 1965, in Oklahoma City, Oklahoma) is an American former professional basketball player who played in the National Basketball Association (NBA). A 6-foot-5-inch (1.96 m), 200-pound (91 kg) shooting guard, Moore played collegiately at the University of Tulsa. He was not drafted, but played with the Dallas Mavericks, Detroit Pistons and the Houston Rockets.

Moore won a Continental Basketball Association (CBA) championship with the Tulsa Fast Breakers in 1989.

Moore's son Tracy Jr. played football at Oklahoma State University.
