= Leonard White (basketball) =

American basketball player (born 1971)

Personal information
- Born: February 21, 1971 (age 55) Century, Florida, U.S.
- Listed height: 6 ft 5 in (1.96 m)
- Listed weight: 215 lb (98 kg)

Career information
- High school: Century (Century, Florida)
- College: Faulkner State (1989–1991); Southern (1991–1993)
- NBA draft: 1993: 2nd round, 53rd overall pick
- Drafted by: Los Angeles Clippers
- Position: Forward

Career history
- 1993–1994: Rapid City Thrillers
- 1994–1995: Mexico Aztecas
- 1995–1996: San Diego Wildcards
- 1997–1998: Grand Rapids Hoops
- 1998–2000: Rockford Lightning
- 2000–2002; 2003–2004: Sioux Falls Skyforce
- 2005–2007: Yakima Sun Kings

Career highlights
- 2× CBA champion (2006, 2007); All-CBA First Team (2004); CBA All-Defensive Team (2004)
- Stats at Basketball Reference

Leonard White (born February 21, 1971) is an American former professional basketball player. He is listed at 6'7" and weighed 224 lbs. Born in Century, Florida, White started playing collegiate ball with the Faulkner State Community College (1989–1991) and is still the all-time leading scorer of the Sun Chiefs with a 22.7 ppg average. He later transferred to Southern University (1991–1993) and led the Jaguars in scoring his last two years there. White entered the 1993 NBA draft and was picked 53rd in the second round by the Los Angeles Clippers; however, he was not signed and never got to play in the NBA. He played a few games in the French professional league in Pau Orthez but it is in the CBA where White will be making his mark in his professional basketball career as one of the league leaders in statistics for games played, minutes played, scoring, rebounds and steals. White has played for the San Diego Wildcards, Grand Rapids Hoops, Rockford Lightning, Sioux Falls Skyforce and Yakama Sun Kings, where he helped them win back-to-back CBA championships. He has also taken his game to the USBL with the Pennsylvania ValleyDawgs, the IBL with the Tacoma Jazz and overseas notably in Venezuela. In the off-season, White coaches high school basketball in Florida.

== Notable Awards ==
- 2 x CBA All-Star (2005 & 2006)
- 2 CBA Championships (2006 & 2007)
- All-CBA First Team (2004)
- CBA All-Defensive Team (2004)
