= Doug Logan =

American sports executive

1st Commissioner of Major League Soccer
- In office January 21, 1995 – August 3, 1999
- Succeeded by: Don Garber

Personal details
- Born: 1943 (age 82–83) New Jersey, U.S.
- Education: Manhattan College; University of Baltimore Law School

Douglas George Logan y Gonzales de Mendoza (born 1943) is an American sports executive. He was the inaugural commissioner of Major League Soccer, and later was the CEO of USA Track & Field.

== Early life ==
Logan was born in New Jersey to an American father and Cuban mother.

He was studying civil engineering at Manhattan College when he was drafted into the military in 1964. He served with the 101st Airborne Division in Vietnam and was decorated with two Bronze Stars. He later studied at the University of Baltimore Law School, graduating in 1972.

== Career ==
=== Early career ===
From 1986 to 1993, Logan was a senior vice president of Ogden Entertainment Services. He later became president and chief executive officer of Mexican entertainment company OCESA. Under his management, the Mexico Aztecas of the Continental Basketball Association became the first American professional sports franchise based in Mexico. The Aztecas relocated to San Diego and became the Wildcards for the 1996 season before folding.

=== MLS Commissioner ===
In 1995, Logan was named the first commissioner of Major League Soccer, working in that capacity through 1999. Sports Business Daily named Logan and the MLS staff Sports Industrialists of the Year for 1996. During Logan's last year at MLS, the league lost $34 million. MLS was reported to have lost $250 million in its first five years under Logan.

=== Later career ===
In 1999, Logan formed the sports consulting firm Empresario. In 2001, he was hired as a consultant in the creation of a professional National Rugby League, structuring the new league as a "single entity" system.

In 2008, Logan was appointed the CEO of USA Track & Field. In September 2010, the USATF Board announced it had fired Logan. Logan later filed a lawsuit for wrongful termination which was ultimately settled.
