= Barry Sumpter =

American basketball player

Personal information
- Born: November 11, 1965 Brooklyn, Illinois, U.S.
- Listed height: 6 ft 11 in (2.11 m)
- Listed weight: 215 lb (98 kg)

Career information
- High school: Lovejoy (Lovejoy, Illinois)
- College: Louisville (1983–1985); Austin Peay (1987–1988)
- NBA draft: 1988: 3rd round, 56th overall pick
- Drafted by: San Antonio Spurs
- Playing career: 1988–1999
- Position: Power forward
- Number: 51

Career history
- 1988–1989: Quad City Thunder
- 1989: Los Angeles Clippers
- 1990–1993: Quad City Thunder
- 1993: Fargo-Moorhead Fever
- 1993–1994: Oklahoma City Cavalry
- 1994–1999: Quad City Thunder

Career highlights
- CBA champion (1998); CBA All-Defensive Team (1989); CBA All-Rookie Team (1989); Second-team All-OVC (1988); Second-team Parade All-American (1983); McDonald's All-American (1983)
- Stats at NBA.com
- Stats at Basketball Reference

Barry Sumpter (born November 11, 1965, in Brooklyn, Illinois) is an American former professional basketball player A 6'11" forward-center, Sumpter attended Lovejoy high school where he excelled at basketball.

Following his college career at University of Louisville and Austin Peay State University, Sumpter was selected by the San Antonio Spurs in the 3rd round (56th overall) of the 1988 NBA draft. He later signed with the Los Angeles Clippers where he played his only career NBA game on April 2, 1989, against the Detroit Pistons. He later played in the Continental Basketball Association, including for the Quad City Thunder where he set the team records for blocked shots (338), rebounds (2,503), and career games played (385). Sumpter was selected to the CBA All-Defensive Team and All-Rookie Team in 1988. In 1998, he won the CBA championship with the Thunder.

== Career statistics ==
Legend
GP	Games played	GS	Games started	MPG	Minutes per game
FG%	Field goal percentage	3P%	3-point field goal percentage	FT%	Free throw percentage
RPG	Rebounds per game	APG	Assists per game	SPG	Steals per game
BPG	Blocks per game	PPG	Points per game	**Bold**	Career high

=== NBA ===
==== Regular season ====
Year	Team	GP	GS	MPG	FG%	3P%	FT%	RPG	APG	SPG	BPG	PPG
1988–89	L.A. Clippers	1	0	1.0	.000	–	–	.0	.0	.0	.0	.0
