= Wichita Falls Texans =

- League: CBA
- Founded: 1988
- Folded: 1994
- Stadium: D.L. Ligon Coliseum
- Location: Wichita Falls, Texas
- Team colors: purple, orange
- Championships: 1 1991

The Wichita Falls Texans were a minor league basketball team in the Continental Basketball Association from 1988 to 1994. The team was located in Wichita Falls, Texas, and played their games at D.L. Ligon Coliseum, located on the campus of Midwestern State University. The Texans won the CBA championship in 1991. Lanham Lyne was the owner of the franchise.

The team almost relocated in 1990 when a group of investors led by George Beim approached the owners of Wichita Falls to purchase and relocate the franchise to Hampton, Virginia. The deal fell through when Beim announced he could not get the prerequisite amount of ticket presales to make moving the team financially viable according to the CBA's rules.

During the 1992–93 season, the Texans had 1,250 season ticket holders and averaged an attendance of 2,826 per game. The team became the Chicago Rockers in 1994.
