= Rich Manning =

American basketball player (born 1970)

Personal information
- Born: June 23, 1970 (age 56) Tacoma, Washington, U.S.
- Listed height: 6 ft 11 in (2.11 m)
- Listed weight: 253 lb (115 kg)

Career information
- High school: Center (Antelope, California)
- College: Syracuse (1988–1990); Washington (1991–1993)
- NBA draft: 1993: 2nd round, 40th overall pick
- Drafted by: Atlanta Hawks
- Playing career: 1993–2001
- Position: Center / power forward
- Number: 15, 50

Career history
- 1993–1994: Rapid City Thrillers
- 1994–1996: Quad City Thunder
- 1996–1997: Vancouver Grizzlies
- 1997: Los Angeles Clippers
- 1997-1998: Quad City Thunder
- 1997–1998: Rockford Lightning
- 1998–2000: Oyak Renault
- 2000–2001: Blue Stars

Career highlights
- First-team All-Pac-10 (1993)
- Stats at NBA.com
- Stats at Basketball Reference

Richard Alan Manning (born June 23, 1970) is an American former professional basketball player who was selected by the Atlanta Hawks in the second round (40th pick overall) of the 1993 NBA draft. A 6'11" power forward-center born in Tacoma, Washington, Manning played two years in the NBA, for the Vancouver Grizzlies (1995–1996) and the Los Angeles Clippers (1996–1997). He played collegiately at both Syracuse University and the University of Washington, after having attended Center High School in Antelope, California.

== Personal life ==
His son, Matt, was drafted by the Detroit Tigers as the 9th overall pick in the first round of the 2016 MLB draft.
