= Dexter Boney =

American basketball player

Personal information
- Born: April 27, 1970 (age 56) Wilmington, Delaware, U.S.
- Listed height: 6 ft 4 in (1.93 m)
- Listed weight: 185 lb (84 kg)

Career information
- High school: Brandywine (Wilmington, Delaware)
- College: Hagerstown CC (1989–1991); UNLV (1991–1993)
- NBA draft: 1993: undrafted
- Playing career: 1994–2002
- Position: Shooting guard
- Number: 10

Career history
- 1994–1995: Mexico Aztecas
- 1996–1997: Florida Beach Dogs
- 1997: Phoenix Suns
- 1997: Florida Beach Dogs
- 1998: Dinamo Sassari
- 1999: Las Vegas Silver Bandits
- 2000: Idaho Stampede
- 2000: Elitzur Ashkelon
- 2000: Alaska Aces
- 2001: Toros de Aragua
- 2001–2002: Besançon BCD
- 2002: Fargo-Moorhead Beez

Career highlights
- CBA Most Valuable Player (1997); CBA All-Star (1997); CBA All-Star Game MVP (1997); All-CBA First Team (1997); First-team All-Big West (1993)
- Stats at NBA.com
- Stats at Basketball Reference

Dexter Lyndell Boney (born April 27, 1970) is an American former college and professional basketball player.

== Biography ==
He was born on April 27, 1970.

Boney played for Brandywine High School, where he was named all-state three times and holds the boys scoring record in Delaware with over 2,000 points. He played collegiately at Hagerstown Junior College of the NJCAA where he averaged 31.6 points as sophomore, and then for two years at University of Nevada, Las Vegas of the NCAA Division I. He later played eight games with the NBA's Phoenix Suns in February of the 1996–97 NBA season.

Boney won the Continental Basketball Association Most Valuable Player award after ranking fourth in scoring (21.7 points per game) and third in steals (2.1 per game) for the Florida Beachdogs during the CBA's 1996–97 season. He last played with the CBA's Fargo-Moorhead Beez in 2002.

He was inducted into the Delaware Sports Hall of Fame in 2019.
