= Mauro Panaggio =

American basketball coach

Personal information
- Born: January 19, 1928
- Died: April 11, 2018 (aged 90) Daytona Beach, Florida, U.S.

Career information
- College: Canisius (1946–1947); SUNY Brockport (1948–1951)

Career history

Coaching
- 1968–1977: SUNY Brockport
- 1978–1979; 1980–1983: Rochester Zeniths
- 1985–1986: Bay State Bombardiers
- 1986–1987: Rockford Lightning
- 1987–1991: Quad City Thunder
- 1991–1995: Rockford Lightning
- 1995–1996: San Diego Wildcards
- 1996: Shreveport Storm

Career highlights
- As head coach: 2× CBA champion (1979, 1981); 3× CBA Coach of the Year (1979, 1986, 1993)

Mauro Panaggio (January 19, 1928 – April 11, 2018) was an American basketball coach at the high school, college, and professional levels. He holds the record for the most coaching wins in the history of the Continental Basketball Association, and was named to the CBA's 50th Anniversary team as coach.

Panaggio grew up in Rochester, New York. He played basketball in high school, then for Canisius College in Buffalo before transferring to SUNY Brockport in Brockport, closer to Rochester. He then moved into coaching at the high school level, working first at Wellsville Central School District and then in the Rochester City School District where his teams won two state championships. He also coached a year at Rush–Henrietta Central School District.

Moving to the small college ranks, Panaggio then coached at his alma mater, Brockport, where his teams won four SUNYAC titles between 1967 and 1977, reaching the Final Four twice. His record at Brockport was 148–76.

He entered the world of professional basketball in 1978 with the CBA's Rochester Zeniths, whom he coached until the team folded in 1983. He was the first coach of the Quad City Thunder starting in 1987; he retired briefly in 1991 but quickly returned to coach the Rockford Lightning. That provided the opportunity to coach against his son, Dan, who had succeeded him as coach in Quad City; the occasion was noted as historic at the time. After a few years at Rockford, he went on to brief stints as coach of two other CBA teams. He was CBA coach of the year three times.

Panaggio's wife, Rita, died on March 16, 2018, at the age of 87. They had six children. Panaggio and his wife were living in Daytona Beach, Florida, at the time of their deaths.
