= Evers Burns =

American basketball player (born 1971)

Personal information
- Born: August 24, 1971 (age 55) Baltimore, Maryland, U.S.
- Listed height: 6 ft 8 in (2.03 m)
- Listed weight: 260 lb (118 kg)

Career information
- High school: Woodlawn (Baltimore, Maryland)
- College: Maryland (1989–1993)
- NBA draft: 1993: 2nd round, 31st overall pick
- Drafted by: Sacramento Kings
- Playing career: 1993–2000
- Position: Power forward
- Number: 53

Career history
- 1993–1994: Sacramento Kings
- 1994: Cagiva Varese
- 1994: Miami Tropics
- 1994: Dafni
- 1994–1995: Sioux Falls Skyforce
- 1995: Miami Tropics
- 1995–1996: Yakima Sun Kings
- 1996: Oklahoma City Cavalry
- 1996: Joventut Badalona
- 1996–1997: Oklahoma City Cavalry
- 1997–1998: Sydney Kings
- 1998: Emlakbank Ortaköy
- 1999: Quad City Thunder
- 1999: Ferro Carril Oeste
- 1999–2000: Richmond Rhythm

Career highlights
- CBA champion (1997)
- Stats at NBA.com
- Stats at Basketball Reference
Medals
Men's basketball
Representing United States
FIBA Americas Championship
Gold medal – first place	1997 Montevideo	Team competition

Evers Allen Burns (born August 24, 1971) is an American former professional basketball player who was selected by the Sacramento Kings in the second round (31st pick overall) of the 1993 NBA draft. A 6'8" forward from the University of Maryland, Burns played in only 22 games as a member of the Kings during the 1993–94 NBA season, averaging 2.4 points per game.

In 1998, Burns played 22 games for the Sydney Kings in the Australian National Basketball League. He also played several seasons in the Continental Basketball Association, for the Sioux Falls Skyforce, Oklahoma City Cavalry, Yakima Sun Kings and Quad City Thunder.
