= 1993 NBA draft =

Basketball player selection

General information
- Sport: Basketball
- Date: June 30, 1993
- Location: The Palace of Auburn Hills (Auburn Hills, Michigan)
- Network: TNT

Overview
- 54 total selections in 2 rounds
- League: NBA
- First selection: Chris Webber (Orlando Magic)
- Hall of Famers: 1: PF Chris Webber

The 1993 NBA draft took place on June 30, 1993, at The Palace of Auburn Hills in Auburn Hills, Michigan. The draft had some talented players at the top, but injuries and personal problems hurt many of them. Chris Webber, Penny Hardaway, Allan Houston, and Jamal Mashburn became All-Stars whose careers were cut short by injuries, with Webber being inducted into the Naismith Basketball Hall of Fame in 2021. Isaiah Rider and Vin Baker showed great potential but were plagued by personal problems. Bobby Hurley's career was derailed by a car wreck in December of his rookie year. The mid-to-late first round (starting with pick 13) was littered with players that failed to make any significant impact, with the exception of three-time NBA champion Sam Cassell. One of the NBA best all-time wing defensive players, three-time champion Bruce Bowen, went undrafted.

Despite having the lowest odds, the Orlando Magic won the first pick in the 1993 NBA draft lottery. It was the second year in a row the Magic won the draft lottery. The Magic drafted Chris Webber with the number one overall pick, but only minutes later, executed a blockbuster trade. The Magic traded Webber to the Golden State Warriors for their first-round pick (#3 overall) Penny Hardaway and three of Golden State's future first-round draft selections.

Lindsey Hunter was the last remaining active player from this draft class, playing his final season in 2009–10.

== Draft selections ==
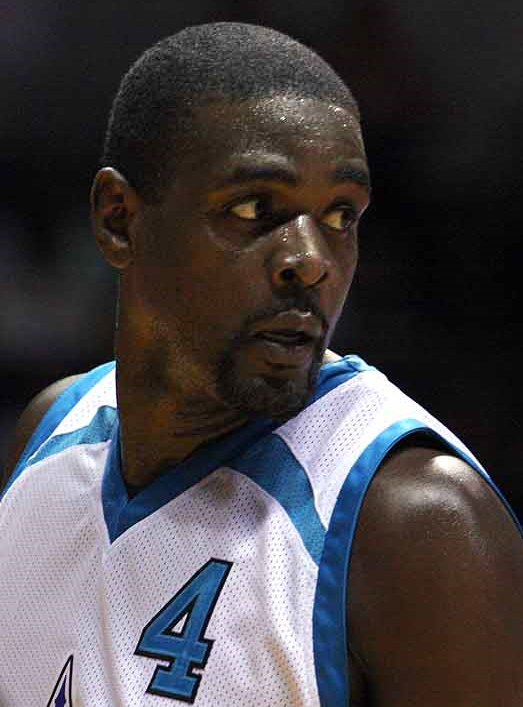
Chris Webber was selected 1st overall by the Orlando Magic (traded to the Golden State Warriors).

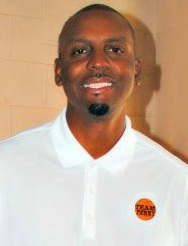
Penny Hardaway was selected 3rd overall by the Golden State Warriors (traded to the Orlando Magic).

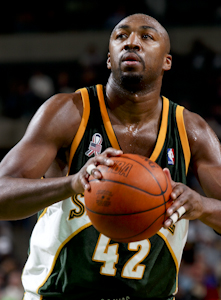
Vin Baker was selected 8th overall by the Milwaukee Bucks.

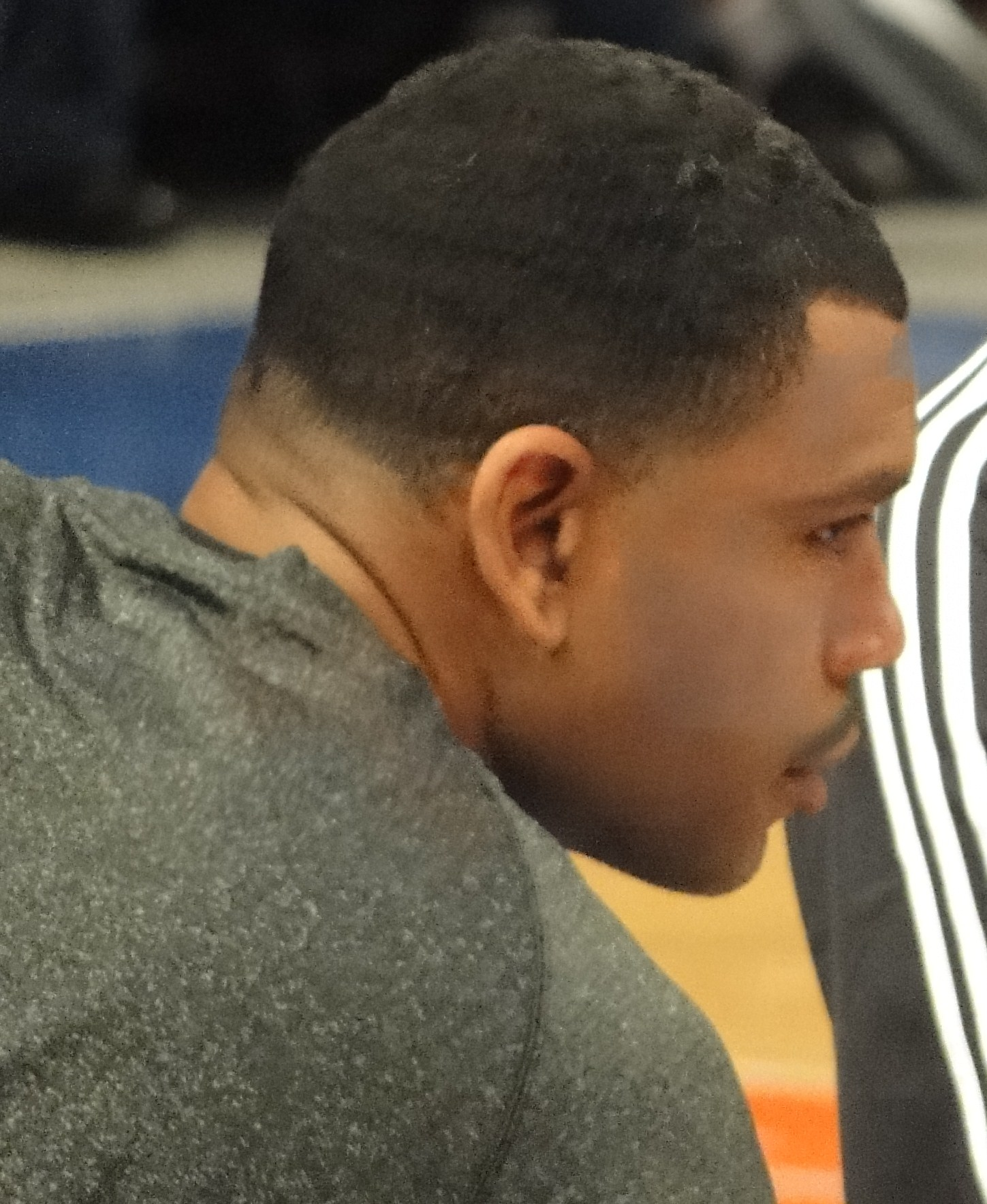
Allan Houston was selected 11th overall by the Detroit Pistons.

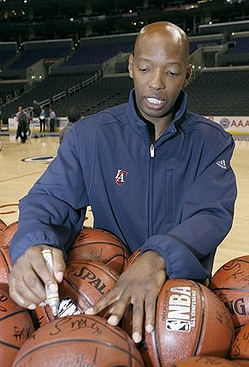
Sam Cassell was selected 24th overall by the Houston Rockets.

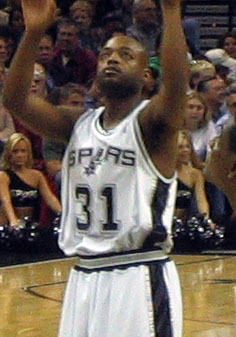
Nick Van Exel was selected 37th overall by the Los Angeles Lakers.

PG	Point guard	SG	Shooting guard	SF	Small forward	PF	Power forward	C	Center

^	Denotes player who has been inducted to the Naismith Memorial Basketball Hall of Fame
*	Denotes player who has been selected for at least one All-Star Game and All-NBA Team
^{+}	Denotes player who has been selected for at least one All-Star Game
^{x}	Denotes player who has been selected for at least one All-NBA Team
^{#}	Denotes player who has never appeared in an NBA regular-season or playoff game
^{~}	Denotes player who has been selected as Rookie of the Year

Round	Pick	Player	Pos.	Nationality (Note: Nationality indicates the player's national team or representative nationality. If a player has not competed at the international level, then the nationality indicates the national team which the player is eligible to represent according to FIBA rules.)	Team	School / club team
1	1	Chris Webber^~	PF/C	United States	Orlando Magic (traded to Golden State)	Michigan (So.)
1	2	Shawn Bradley	C	Germany	Philadelphia 76ers	BYU (Fr.)
1	3	Penny Hardaway*	PG/SG	United States	Golden State Warriors (traded to Orlando)	Memphis State (Jr.)
1	4	Jamal Mashburn*	SF	United States	Dallas Mavericks	Kentucky (Jr.)
1	5	Isaiah Rider	SG	United States	Minnesota Timberwolves	UNLV (Sr.)
1	6	Calbert Cheaney	SG/SF	United States	Washington Bullets	Indiana (Sr.)
1	7	Bobby Hurley	PG	United States	Sacramento Kings	Duke (Sr.)
1	8	Vin Baker*	PF	United States	Milwaukee Bucks	Hartford (Sr.)
1	9	Rodney Rogers	PF	United States	Denver Nuggets	Wake Forest (Jr.)
1	10	Lindsey Hunter	PG	United States	Detroit Pistons (from Miami)	Jackson State (Sr.)
1	11	Allan Houston^{+}	SG	United States	Detroit Pistons	Tennessee (Sr.)
1	12	George Lynch	SF	United States	Los Angeles Lakers	North Carolina (Sr.)
1	13	Terry Dehere	SG	United States	Los Angeles Clippers	Seton Hall (Sr.)
1	14	Scott Haskin	PF	United States	Indiana Pacers	Oregon State (Sr.)
1	15	Doug Edwards	SF	United States	Atlanta Hawks	Florida State (Sr.)
1	16	Rex Walters	SG	United States	New Jersey Nets	Kansas (Sr.)
1	17	Greg Graham	SG	United States	Charlotte Hornets	Indiana (Sr.)
1	18	Luther Wright	C	United States	Utah Jazz	Seton Hall (Jr.)
1	19	Acie Earl	C	United States	Boston Celtics	Iowa (Sr.)
1	20	Scott Burrell	SF	United States	Charlotte Hornets (from San Antonio)	Connecticut (Sr.)
1	21	James Robinson	SG	United States	Portland Trail Blazers	Alabama (Jr.)
1	22	Chris Mills	SF	United States	Cleveland Cavaliers	Arizona (Sr.)
1	23	Ervin Johnson	C	United States	Seattle SuperSonics	New Orleans (Sr.)
1	24	Sam Cassell*	PG	United States	Houston Rockets	Florida State (Sr.)
1	25	Corie Blount	PF	United States	Chicago Bulls	Cincinnati (Sr.)
1	26	Geert Hammink	C	Netherlands	Orlando Magic (from New York)	LSU (Sr.)
1	27	Malcolm Mackey	PF	United States	Phoenix Suns	Georgia Tech (Sr.)
2	28	Lucious Harris	PG	United States	Dallas Mavericks	Long Beach State (Sr.)
2	29	Sherron Mills^{#}	F/C	United States	Minnesota Timberwolves	VCU (Sr.)
2	30	Gheorghe Mureșan	C	Romania	Washington Bullets	Pau-Orthez (France)
2	31	Evers Burns	F	United States	Sacramento Kings	Maryland (Sr.)
2	32	Alphonso Ford	SG	United States	Philadelphia 76ers	Mississippi Valley State (Sr.)
2	33	Eric Riley	C	United States	Dallas Mavericks	Michigan (Sr.)
2	34	Darnell Mee	SG	United States	Golden State Warriors	Western Kentucky (Sr.)
2	35	Ed Stokes	C	United States	Miami Heat	Arizona (Sr.)
2	36	John Best^{#}	F/C	United States	New Jersey Nets	Tennessee Tech (Sr.)
2	37	Nick Van Exel^{+}	PG	United States	Los Angeles Lakers	Cincinnati (Sr.)
2	38	Conrad McRae^{#}	PF	United States	Washington Bullets	Syracuse (Sr.)
2	39	Thomas Hill^{#}	SG/SF	United States	Indiana Pacers	Duke (Sr.)
2	40	Rich Manning	C	United States	Atlanta Hawks	Washington (Sr.)
2	41	Anthony Reed^{#}	F	United States	Chicago Bulls	Tulane (Sr.)
2	42	Adonis Jordan	PG	United States	Seattle SuperSonics	Kansas (Sr.)
2	43	Josh Grant	PF	United States	Denver Nuggets	Utah (Sr.)
2	44	Alex Holcombe^{#}	C	United States	Sacramento Kings	Baylor (Sr.)
2	45	Bryon Russell	SF	United States	Utah Jazz	Long Beach State (Sr.)
2	46	Richard Petruška	C	Slovakia	Houston Rockets	UCLA (Sr.)
2	47	Chris Whitney	PG	United States	San Antonio Spurs	Clemson (Sr.)
2	48	Kevin Thompson	C	United States	Portland Trail Blazers	NC State (Sr.)
2	49	Mark Buford^{#}	C	United States	Phoenix Suns	Mississippi Valley State (Sr.)
2	50	Marcelo Nicola^{#}	PF	Argentina	Houston Rockets	Taugres (Spain)
2	51	Spencer Dunkley^{#}	C	United Kingdom	Indiana Pacers	Delaware (Sr.)
2	52	Mike Peplowski	C	United States	Sacramento Kings	Michigan State (Sr.)
2	53	Leonard White^{#}	F	United States	Los Angeles Clippers	Southern (Sr.)
2	54	Byron Wilson^{#}	SG/SF	United States	Phoenix Suns	Utah (Sr.)

== Notable undrafted players ==
These players were not selected in the 1993 NBA draft but have played at least one game in the NBA.

Player	Pos.	Nationality	School/club team
Ashraf Amaya	F	United States	Southern Illinois (Sr.)
Dexter Boney	G	United States	UNLV (Sr.)
Bruce Bowen	SF	United States	Cal State Fullerton (Sr.)
Mitchell Butler	PG	United States	UCLA (Sr.)
Kornél Dávid	PF	Hungary	Tungsram-Honvéd (Hungary)
Bill Edwards	F	United States	Wright State (Sr.)
Evric Gray	SF	United States	UNLV (Sr.)
Antonio Harvey	PF	United States	Pfeiffer (Sr.)
Stanley Jackson	SG	United States	UAB (Sr.)
Warren Kidd	C	United States	Middle Tennessee (Sr.)
Todd Mundt	C	United States	Delta State (Sr.)
Julius Nwosu	PF	Nigeria	Liberty (Sr.)
Bo Outlaw	PF/C	United States	Houston (Sr.)
Antoine Rigaudeau	PG/SG	France	Cholet Basket (France)
Brent Scott	C	United States	Rice (Sr.)
Matt Wenstrom	C	United States	North Carolina (Sr.)
Aaron Williams	PF/C	United States	Xavier (Sr.)

== Early entrants ==
=== College underclassmen ===
For the eleventh year in a row and the fifteenth time in sixteen years, no college underclassman would withdraw their entry into the NBA draft. However, this would the third time in NBA history where a foreign-born player would enter the NBA draft as an underclassman of sorts, as well as be the first time said player didn't represent the Eastern Bloc, but instead represented Africa (although still playing in Europe at the time). It would also be the seventh time in eight years that a player that would leave college in order to play basketball professionally overseas would declare entry into the NBA draft as an underclassman of sorts, with the Australian born Tony Ronaldson leaving Arizona State University to play for the South East Melbourne Magic in his home nation. Including those two players, the total number of underclassmen that entered this year's draft is twenty. Regardless, the following college basketball players successfully applied for early draft entrance.

- (United States) Milton Bell – F, Richmond (junior)
- (United States) Antonio Bowen – F, Northern Oklahoma JC (freshman)
- (Germany) Shawn Bradley – C, BYU (freshman)
- (United States) Kenny Carter – G, Luzerne County CC (freshman)
- (United States) Parrish Casebier – G, Evansville (junior)
- (United States) Shawn Copes – F, Central Missouri (junior)
- (United States) Jim Dickinson – C, Seton Hall (junior)
- (United States) Anfernee Hardaway – G, Memphis (junior)
- (United States) Daniel Lyton – F, Riverside City (junior)
- (United States) Jamal Mashburn – F, Kentucky (junior)
- (United States) Malloy Nesmith – G, Utah State (junior)
- (United States) James Robinson – G, Alabama (junior)
- (United States) Rodney Rogers – F, Wake Forest (junior)
- (United States) Ryan Swank – G, Luzerne County CC (sophomore)
- (United States) Kevin Thomas – F, Beaver County CC (freshman)
- (United States) Ernest Vickers – F, Panhandle State (junior)
- (United States) Chris Webber – F, Michigan (sophomore)
- (United States) Luther Wright – C, Seton Hall (junior)

=== International players ===
For the third time in NBA history, an international player would enter the NBA draft. This draft would also be the first time a foreign player entering the NBA draft would not come from the Eastern Bloc, but instead represent Africa while playing in Europe. The following international player successfully applied for early draft entrance.

- (Senegal) Etienne Preira – F, ADA Blois (France)

=== Other eligible players ===
Player	Team	Note	Ref.
(Australia) Tony Ronaldson	South East Melbourne Magic (Australia)	Left Arizona State in 1992; playing professionally since the 1992–93 season	

== Invited attendees ==
The 1993 NBA draft is considered to be the sixteenth NBA draft to have utilized what's properly considered the "green room" experience for NBA prospects. The NBA's green room is a staging area where anticipated draftees often sit with their families and representatives, waiting for their names to be called on draft night. Often being positioned either in front of or to the side of the podium (in this case, being positioned somewhere within The Palace of Auburn Hills), once a player heard his name, he would walk to the podium to shake hands and take promotional photos with the NBA commissioner. From there, the players often conducted interviews with various media outlets while backstage. From there, the players often conducted interviews with various media outlets while backstage. However, once the NBA draft started to air nationally on TV starting with the 1980 NBA draft, the green room evolved from players waiting to hear their name called and then shaking hands with these select players who were often called to the hotel to take promotional pictures with the NBA commissioner a day or two after the draft concluded to having players in real-time waiting to hear their names called up and then shaking hands with David Stern, the NBA's commissioner at the time. The NBA compiled its list of green room invites through collective voting by the NBA's team presidents and general managers alike, which in this year's case belonged to only what they believed were the top 17 prospects at the time. Despite the large amount of invites that held some very successful players, two notable absences from this group include Sam Cassell from Florida State University and Nick Van Exel from the University of Cincinnati, with 7'7" Romanian center Gheorghe Mureșan waiting until the second round to be selected himself. Even so, the following players were invited to attend this year's draft festivities live and in person.

- (United States) Vin Baker – PF, Hartford
- (Germany) Shawn Bradley – C, Brigham Young
- (United States) Calbert Cheaney – SG/SF, Indiana
- (United States) Terry Dehere – SG, Seton Hall
- (United States) Acie Earl – C, Iowa
- (United States) Doug Edwards – SF, Florida State
- (United States) Anfernee "Penny" Hardaway – PG/SG, Memphis State
- (United States) Allan Houston – SG, Tennessee
- (United States) Lindsey Hunter – PG, Jackson State
- (United States) Bobby Hurley – PG, Duke
- (United States) Jamal Mashburn – SF, Kentucky
- (United States) Chris Mills – SF, Arizona
- (Romania) Gheorghe Mureșan – C, Élan Béarnais Pau-Orthez (France)
- (United States) Isaiah Rider – SG, UNLV
- (United States) Rodney Rogers – PF, Wake Forest
- (United States) Chris Webber – PF/C, Michigan
- (United States) Luther Wright – C, Seton Hall

== See also ==
- List of first overall NBA draft picks
