= Alex Holcombe =

American basketball player (born 1969)

Personal information
- Born: November 22, 1969 (age 56) Houston, Texas, U.S.
- Listed height: 6 ft 9 in (2.06 m)
- Listed weight: 244 lb (111 kg)

Career information
- High school: Kashmere (Houston, Texas)
- College: Baylor (1989–1993)
- NBA draft: 1993: 2nd round, 44th overall pick
- Drafted by: Sacramento Kings
- Playing career: 1993–2001
- Position: Power forward / center

Career history
- 1993: CB Breogán
- 1993–1994: Grand Rapids Hoops
- 1994: Piratas de Quebradillas
- 1994–1995: Olimpia Basketball Club
- 1995: Mexico Aztecas
- 1995: CB Sevilla
- 1995–1996: BBC Kangoeroes Willebroek
- 1996–1997: Noteć Inowrocław
- 1997–1998: Nagoya Diamond Dolphins
- 1998: Noteć Inowrocław
- 1999–2000: New Mexico Slam
- 2000–2001: Jiangsu Dragons
- 2001: Trotamundos de Carabobo
- Stats at Basketball Reference

Alex Bernard Holcombe (born November 22, 1969) is an American former professional basketball player. He played for Kashmere High School in Houston, Texas before playing college basketball for the Baylor Bears. Holcombe was selected by the Sacramento Kings as the 44th overall pick in the 1993 NBA draft but never played in the National Basketball Association (NBA). He instead played professionally in Europe, Puerto Rico, Argentina, Japan, Venezuela and the United States minor leagues.

His son, Alex Holcombe, plays college basketball for the Dallas Baptist Patriots.

== Career statistics ==
Legend
GP	Games played	GS	Games started	MPG	Minutes per game
FG%	Field goal percentage	3P%	3-point field goal percentage	FT%	Free throw percentage
RPG	Rebounds per game	APG	Assists per game	SPG	Steals per game
BPG	Blocks per game	PPG	Points per game	**Bold**	Career high

=== College ===
Year	Team	GP	GS	MPG	FG%	3P%	FT%	RPG	APG	SPG	BPG	PPG
1989–90	Baylor	24	–	13.2	.566	–	.548	3.6	.6	.4	.5	4.9
1990–91	Baylor	26	–	14.5	.578	–	.391	3.5	.3	.3	.4	4.7
1991–92	Baylor	**27**	26	19.2	.600	–	**.583**	4.6	.4	.4	.9	7.6
1992–93	Baylor	**27**	**27**	**35.1**	**.624**	–	.578	**9.4**	**1.1**	**1.0**	**1.9**	**19.2**
Career		104	53	20.8	.605	–	.546	5.3	.6	.5	.9	9.3
