= Chicago Rockers =

- Conference: American
- Leagues: Continental Basketball Association
- Founded: 1994
- Dissolved: 1996
- Arena: UIC Pavilion
- Location: Chicago, Illinois, US
- Team colors: black, white, orange
- Head coach: John Treloar
- Ownership: Major Broadcasting (owned by Chris Devine)

The Chicago Rockers were a men's professional basketball team based in Chicago from 1994 to 1996. The Rockers competed in the American Conference of the Continental Basketball Association (CBA). The team was owned by Chris Devine, a Chicago businessman. Home games were played at UIC Pavilion.

John Treloar served as the Rockers head coach during the 1994–95 season. Former Chicago Bulls player Dave Corzine was hired as the head coach for the 1995–96 season.

The team was relocated to Chicago from Wichita Falls, Texas where the team was playing as the Texans from 1988 to 1994. After a financially tumultuous season in 1995–96 the team relocated to La Crosse, Wisconsin and renamed the Bobcats.

== Franchise history ==
=== 1994–95: Inaugural season ===
On June 14, 1994 Chris Devine of the Chicago based company Major Broadcasting purchased the Wichita Falls Texans, a Continental Basketball Association (CBA) team in Wichita Falls, Texas. The team was moved to Chicago and renamed the "Rockers".

John Treloar was the head coach in Wichita Falls and stayed in that capacity when the team re-located to Chicago. Chico Averbuck was hired as an assistant coach. Mike Davis joined the Rockers as a player-coach. Prior to that season Davis had not played professional basketball in five years. Elston Turner was hired in October 1994 as another player-coach.

Jeff Schwartz, whose resume included creating "Disco Demolition Night" while working for the Chicago White Sox, was hired as the Rockers general manager. Mitch Rosen, who was vice president of Major Broadcasting, succeeded Schwartz in January 1995. Kevin Cook served as the team's marketing director.

Regular season home games were played at the UIC Pavilion on the campus of the University of Illinois Chicago. Scott May was hired as the arena musician for the Rockers, supplying the team with accompanying music during games. He used a 1970s Travis Bean guitar for the music and sound effects.

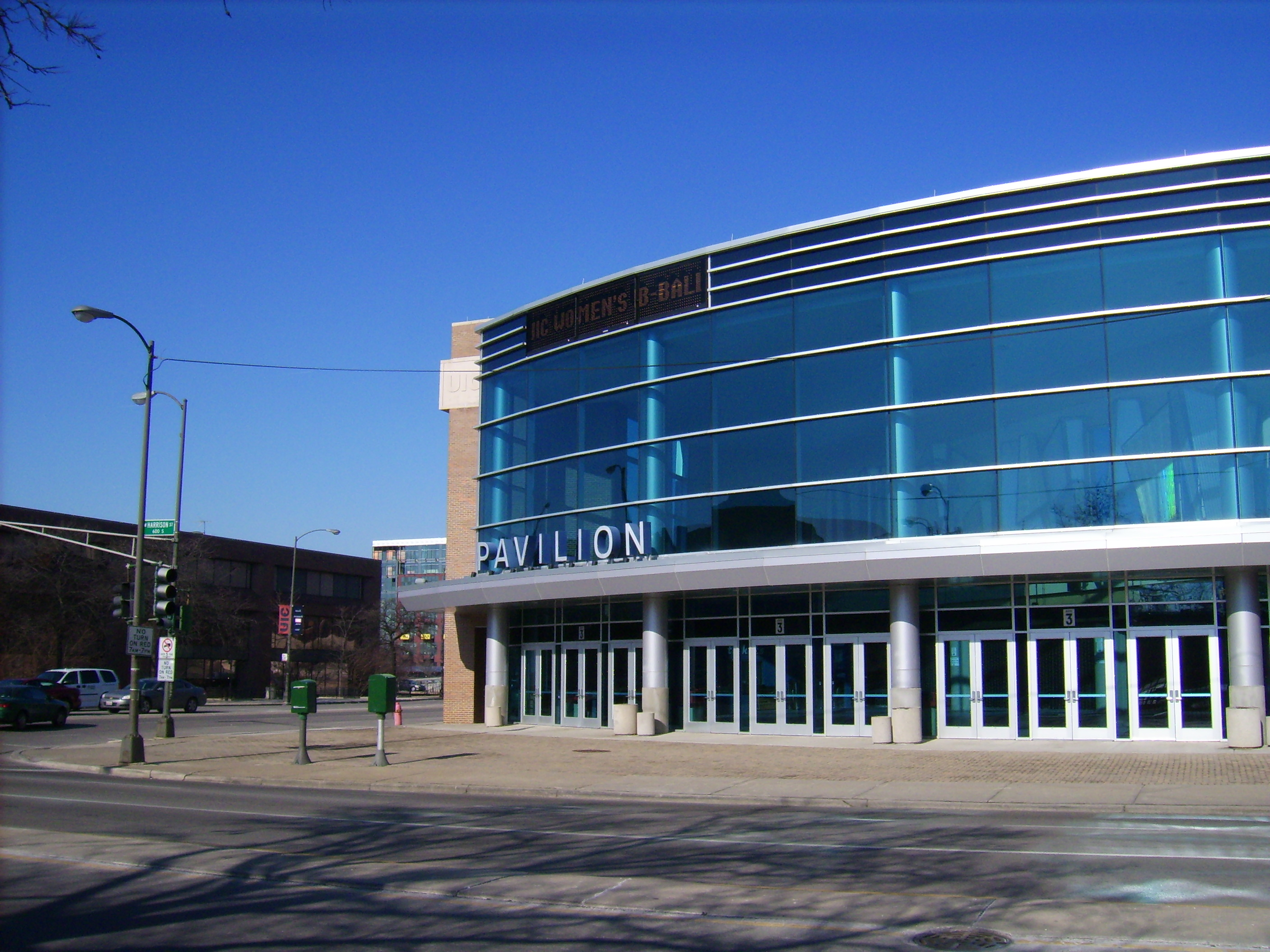
The Chicago Rockers of the CBA played home games at the UIC Pavilion (pictured) on the campus of the University of Illinois Chicago.

The Rockers marketing campaign was not aimed at trying to draw interest away from the Chicago Bulls, the city's successful National Basketball Association franchise. Instead marketing director Kevin Cook wanted the team to be seen as an economic alternative to the Bulls. Tickets to see the Rockers started at $4 and topped out at $25 whereas the NBA franchise charged as low as $15 a ticket to as much as $325.

Given the popularity of basketball in Indiana it was also a strategy of the marketing team to woo fans from Northern Indiana. The team scheduled a pre-season game at the Genesis Convention Center in Gary, Indiana.

During the 1994 CBA draft the Rockers had the eighth pick out of 16 teams. The Rockers selected Derrick Phelps from the University of North Carolina, Deon Thomas from the University of Illinois, Robert Churchwell from Georgetown University, Shon Tarver from the University of California–Los Angeles, and Kenny Williams from the University of Illinois Chicago, respectively.

Open try-outs were held by the Rockers from October 15 to October 16, 1994 at Angel Guardian Gymnasium in Chicago. A pre-registration fee of $100 was necessary to participate or participants could pay $150 for on-site registration fee.

The first regular season game was played against the Omaha Racers in Omaha, Nebraska on November 18, 1994 in front of 4,097 spectators at Ak-Sar-Ben. The Rockers were behind 61–52 after three quarters, but rallied in the fourth to win the game 122–107. Rodney Blake of the Rockers led all scorers with 29 points followed by teammate Stephen Bardo who had 28 points.

On November 26, 1994 the Rockers held their home opener at the UIC Pavilion in Chicago against the Pittsburgh Piranhas. A free throw shooting contest between Mr. T and Hulk Hogan was held at halftime with the latter winning 8–7. Attendance was 5,260 to see Chicago put Pittsburgh away, 93–90.

During the 1994–95 season, WMVP-AM broadcast 10 games of the Chicago Rockers. WJYS, a television station based in Hammond, Indiana, aired 40 regular season games. Norm Van Lier, a former Chicago Bulls player, hosted The CBA Today on SportsChannel Chicago, which featured content centered around the Rockers and the CBA. Gene Honda served as the Rockers public address announcer, a capacity he also served as for the Chicago White Sox and the Chicago Blackhawks.

During March 1995 the Rockers ownership offered between $300,000 to $400,000 to former Chicago Bulls guard John Paxson to come out of retirement and play in the CBA for Chicago. They also purchased the rights to negotiate with Michael Jordan if he ever wanted to join the CBA.

The Rockers made the 1995 CBA playoffs with a 28–28 record. During the first round, Chicago defeated the Quad City Thunder in a five-game series. Chicago faced the Pittsburgh Piranhas in the American Conference Finals. Pittsburgh swept Chicago three games to zero in a best-of five series.

=== 1995–96: Final season and re-location ===
It was announced that the Chicago Rockers would host free agent try-outs for the upcoming 1995–96 season. The event was hosted at Solheim Center on the campus of the Moody Bible Institute in Chicago.

Dave Corzine was hired as head coach in August 1995. John Paxson was a candidate for the head coach job, but took an assistant coach position with the Chicago Bulls instead. Mitch Rosen was retained at the general manager position, but at some point in the season was replaced by Bruce Buzil. The team's vice president was Robert McAuliff.

All 56 Chicago Rockers games were carried on WCBR in Arlington Heights, Illinois. The team's general manager, Mich Rosen, served as the play-by-play announcer during away games.

The first game of the season was played on November 17, 1995 against the San Diego Wildcards at the San Diego Sports Arena. The Wildcards were victorious, 108–106. It was the San Diego franchises' first game and first win.

On February 9, 1996 the Chicago Rockers were evicted from their home arena, the UIC Pavilion, after the arena's management canceled the lease due to backed rent. According to pavilion management, the Rockers executives were $10,000 behind in their rent and were required to pay in advance for future games. A press release from the Rockers accused the UIC Pavilion of canceling the lease in retaliation for previously announcing they were looking for a new venue. The issue was resolved when the Rockers paid $108,000 in backed rent to the operators of the UIC Pavilion. They also came to an agreement to play in the venue through the rest of the season.

The Milwaukee Journal Sentinel reported on January 25, 1996 that the Rockers were second-to-last in the CBA in attendance with an average of 2,052 spectators per game. Ownership for the Chicago franchise indicated they were looking to move the team to La Crosse, Wisconsin. Rockers owner Chris Devine and general manager Bruce Buzil visited La Crosse in February 1996 to meet with business leaders to see if there would be interest in sponsorship. Gary, Indiana and Rapid City, South Dakota were also named as possible destinations.

In an attempt to keep the franchise in Illinois, team executive also reached out to city officials in Hoffman Estates, Palatine, Rolling Meadows, and Schaumburg. The team's vice president announced plans for a 15-acre entertainment complex which would include a theater, hotel rooms, restaurants and a 7,000 seat stadium. Plans for the stadium included an inflatable roof. The estimated cost of the complex would be one million to two million dollars. Village President Rita L. Mullins of Palatine was quoted in the Daily Herald saying, "I'm very excited about the prospect of becoming the home of a sports team like that".

On March 12, 1996 the Chicago Rockers announced they were moving to La Crosse, Wisconsin after the 1995–96 season. The team reached an agreement to play at the La Crosse Center, paying one year's rent in advance. They would later become known as the La Crosse Bobcats.

The Chicago Rockers did not make the CBA playoffs in 1996 and finished the season with a 26–30 record.

== Awards and accolades ==
- 1994–95 CBA's first-team All-Rookie Team: Derrick Phelps
- 1994–95 CBA's second-team All-Rookie Team: Robert Churchwell

== Season-by-season records ==
Years	Wins	Losses	Winning percentage	Head coach	Ref
1994–95	28	28	.500	John Treloar	
1995–96	26	30	.464	Dave Corzine	
