= Evric Gray =

American basketball player (born 1969)

Personal information
- Born: December 13, 1969 (age 56) Bloomington, California, U.S.
- Listed height: 6 ft 7 in (2.01 m)
- Listed weight: 235 lb (107 kg)

Career information
- High school: Bloomington (Bloomington, California)
- College: UNLV (1990–1993)
- NBA draft: 1993: undrafted
- Playing career: 1993–2009
- Position: Small forward
- Number: 2

Career history
- 1993–1994: Juventus Caserta
- 1994: Hartford Hellcats
- 1994: Quad City Thunder
- 1994–1995: CRO Lyon
- 1995: Olympia Venado Tuerto
- 1995: San Diego Wildcards
- 1995–1996: Fort Wayne Fury
- 1996: New Jersey Nets
- 1997: Olympiacos
- 1997–1998: Daiwa Securities Hotblizzards
- 1998: Cibona Zagreb
- 1999: Fort Wayne Fury
- 1999: Atlantic City Seagulls
- 1999–2000: Gimnasia Comodoro
- 2000: Deportivo Libertad
- 2000: Cholet
- 2000–2002: Deportivo Libertad
- 2002: Atlético Welcome
- 2002: Gaiteros del Zulia
- 2003–2005: Quilmes de Mar del Plata
- 2005–2006: Deportivo Universidad Católica
- 2006–2007: Utah Eagles
- 2008–2009: Salt Lake City Saints
- Stats at NBA.com
- Stats at Basketball Reference

Evric Lee Gray (born December 13, 1969) is an American former professional basketball player. He was a 6-foot-7-inch (2.01 m) small forward.

Gray played college basketball at UNLV.

Gray played in the National Basketball Association (NBA), with the New Jersey Nets. He also played professionally in Europe.

His daughter, Alexa Gray, was an accomplished volleyball player at BYU, plays on the Canadian national team, and plays professionally in Italy.
