= Greg Grant (basketball, born 1966) =

American basketball player (born 1966)

Personal information
- Born: August 29, 1966 (age 60) Trenton, New Jersey, U.S.
- Listed height: 5 ft 7 in (1.70 m)
- Listed weight: 140 lb (64 kg)

Career information
- High school: Trenton Central (Trenton, New Jersey)
- College: Morris Brown (1984–1985); TCNJ (1986–1989)
- NBA draft: 1989: 2nd round, 52nd overall pick
- Drafted by: Phoenix Suns
- Playing career: 1989–1998
- Position: Point guard
- Number: 10, 14, 5, 3, 9, 1

Career history
- 1989–1990: Phoenix Suns
- 1990–1991: New York Knicks
- 1991: Charlotte Hornets
- 1991–1993: Philadelphia 76ers
- 1993–1994: Rapid City Thrillers
- 1994: Pittsburgh Piranhas
- 1994–1995: Mexico Aztecas
- 1995: Denver Nuggets
- 1995: Capitanes de Arecibo
- 1995: San Diego Wildcards
- 1995: Philadelphia 76ers
- 1995–1996: Shreveport Storm
- 1995–1996: Washington Bullets
- 1996: Denver Nuggets
- 1996: Atlantic City Seagulls
- 1996–1997: C. Montana Forlì
- 1997: Sioux Falls Skyforce
- 1997–1998: Connecticut Pride

Career highlights
- CBA assists leader (1995); NABC Division III Player of the Year (1989); 2× First-team Division III All-American – NABC (1988, 1989)

Career NBA statistics
- Points: 767 (2.8 ppg)
- Rebounds: 248 (0.9 rpg)
- Assists: 751 (2.7 apg)
- Stats at NBA.com
- Stats at Basketball Reference

Gregory Alan Grant (born August 29, 1966) is an American former professional basketball player.

Growing up in a broken home, Grant worked in a fish market while in high school. After being discovered at the local playground, the 5-foot-7-inch (1.70 m) point guard enrolled at Trenton State College (now The College of New Jersey, or TCNJ for short) in 1986, and led Division III in scoring in 1989.

That same year he was selected with the 52nd overall pick by the Phoenix Suns in the NBA draft. He spent six years in the NBA, playing for six different teams. Grant now runs a sports academy in Trenton. He also offers one-on-one instructions and clinics.

With the help of writer (and fellow Trenton native) Martin Sumners, Grant detailed his unlikely journey from the playgrounds to college and all the way to the NBA in his autobiography, 94 Feet and Rising: The Journey of Greg Grant to the NBA and Beyond, released on July 17, 2009.

Grant was named head coach of Trenton Central High School in 2010. He implemented initiatives that included a larger focus on education and better performances on court. In the 2013–14 school year, he coached Trenton to a 27–3 record en route to the Mercer County division title, and the school's first ever Colonial Valley Conference Championship (they lost to Linden in the state championship). He retired after five years, compiling a 100–32 record over that time, and a 100 percent graduation rate from his players.

== Career statistics ==
Legend
| GP | Games played | GS | Games started | MPG | Minutes per game |
| FG% | Field goal percentage | 3P% | 3-point field goal percentage | FT% | Free throw percentage |
| RPG | Rebounds per game | APG | Assists per game | SPG | Steals per game |
| BPG | Blocks per game | PPG | Points per game | **Bold** | Career high |

=== NBA ===
Source

=== Regular season ===
| Year | Team | GP | GS | MPG | FG% | 3P% | FT% | RPG | APG | SPG | BPG | PPG |
|---|---|---|---|---|---|---|---|---|---|---|---|---|
| 1989–90 | Phoenix | 67 | **3** | 10.1 | .384 | .188 | .661 | .9 | 2.5 | .5 | .0 | 3.1 |
| 1990–91 | New York | 22 | 0 | 4.9 | .370 | .333 | .833 | .5 | .9 | .4 | .0 | 1.2 |
| 1991–92 | Charlotte | 13 | 0 | 4.4 | .000 | – | .500 | .3 | 1.4 | .6 | .0 | .1 |
| 1991–92 | Philadelphia | 55 | 0 | 15.2 | **.456** | **.389** | **.864** | 1.2 | 3.6 | .7 | .0 | **4.1** |
| 1992–93 | Philadelphia | **72** | 0 | 13.8 | .350 | .294 | .645 | .9 | 2.9 | .6 | .0 | 2.7 |
| 1994–95 | Denver | 14 | 0 | 10.8 | .303 | .286 | .750 | .6 | 3.1 | .4 | .1 | 2.2 |
| 1995–96 | Philadelphia | 11 | 2 | **25.5** | .375 | .222 | .833 | **1.9** | **5.5** | **1.1** | **.2** | **4.1** |
| 1995–96 | Washington | 10 | 0 | 13.8 | .393 | .200 | – | .6 | 2.3 | .8 | .0 | 2.4 |
| 1995–96 | Denver | 10 | 0 | 10.9 | .261 | .333 | – | .7 | 1.4 | .2 | .0 | 1.4 |
| Career | | 274 | 5 | 12.2 | .383 | .281 | .710 | .9 | 2.7 | .6 | .0 | 2.8 |

=== Playoffs ===
| Year | Team | GP | GS | MPG | FG% | 3P% | FT% | RPG | APG | SPG | BPG | PPG |
|---|---|---|---|---|---|---|---|---|---|---|---|---|
| 1990 | Phoenix | **7** | 0 | **6.7** | **.450** | **.333** | – | .9 | 1.4 | **.3** | .0 | **2.7** |
| 1995 | Denver | 3 | 0 | **6.7** | .000 | .000 | **1.000** | **1.0** | **1.7** | **.3** | .0 | .7 |
| Career | | 10 | 0 | 6.7 | .346 | .250 | 1.000 | .9 | 1.5 | .3 | .0 | 2.1 |

== See also ==
- List of shortest players in National Basketball Association history
