= A. J. Wynder =

American basketball player and coach (born 1964)

Nassau Community College Lions
- Title: Head coach

Personal information
- Born: September 11, 1964 (age 62) The Bronx, New York, U.S.
- Listed height: 6 ft 2 in (1.88 m)
- Listed weight: 180 lb (82 kg)

Career information
- High school: Saint Agnes (Rockville Centre, New York)
- College: UMass (1982–1983); Fairfield (1983–1987)
- NBA draft: 1987: undrafted
- Playing career: 1987–1996
- Position: Point guard
- Number: 12

Career history

Playing
- 1987–1988: Wyoming Wildcatters
- 1988–1990: Cedar Rapids Silver Bullets
- 1990–1992: Quad City Thunder
- 1991: Boston Celtics
- 1992–1995: Tri-City Chinook
- 1995–1996: Connecticut Pride
- 1995–1996: San Diego Wildcards
- 1995–1996: Yakima Sun Kings
- 1995–1996: Sioux Falls Skyforce

Coaching
- 1993–1995: Tri-City Chinook (assistant)
- 1997–present: Nassau CC

Career highlights
- 3× CBA All-Defensive Team (1991–1993); CBA steals leader (1991)
- Stats at NBA.com
- Stats at Basketball Reference
Medals
Men's basketball
Representing United States
Pan American Games
Silver medal – second place	1995 Mar del Plata	National team

A. J. Wynder (born September 11, 1964) is an American college basketball coach and the current head coach of the Nassau Community College men's basketball team. A former professional basketball player, during his playing career Wynder was a member of the United States national basketball team that won a silver medal at the 1995 Pan American Games and was a member of the Boston Celtics of the National Basketball Association during the 1990–91 season. A native of Long Island, he grew up in Freeport, New York.

== College career ==
Wynder attended Fairfield University where he was selected a Second Team All-MAAC in 1987 and helped lead the Stags to back-to-back MAAC Championships and NCAA Tournament appearances in 1986 and 1987. In the 1987 MAAC tourney title game, Wynder hit a buzzer beater at the end of regulation to send the game to overtime. Fairfield would go on to beat Iona in the game and head off to the NCAA tournament.

== Professional career ==
Wynder played for the Boston Celtics in National Basketball Association during the 1990–91 NBA season. He also played 10 seasons in the Continental Basketball Association (CBA) from 1987 to 1989 and from 1990 to 1996. Wydner was selected to the All-Defensive Team from 1991 to 1993.

== USA Basketball career ==
Wynder helped USA win a silver medal in the 1995 Pan American Games in Mar del Plata, Argentina. During the tournament Wynder set the US basketball record for 3-point shooting accuracy hitting 8-of-12 or 66.7 percent of his 3-point shots.

== Coaching career ==
Wynder is the fourth head coach of the Nassau Community College men's basketball team. During his 11 seasons coaching NCC, Wynder has compiled an overall 208–86 record. In 2002, Wynder was named Region XV Coach of the Year. Coach Wynder has led NCC to three title games ('02, '06, '07) of the Region XV (Div. III) championship.

Wynder also served as a player/assistant coach while playing for the Tri City Chinooks in Washington state from 1993 to 1995.
