= Matt Steigenga =

American basketball player (born 1970)

Personal information
- Born: March 27, 1970 (age 56) Grand Rapids, Michigan, U.S.
- Listed height: 6 ft 7 in (2.01 m)
- Listed weight: 225 lb (102 kg)

Career information
- High school: South Christian (Grand Rapids, Michigan)
- College: Michigan State (1988–1992)
- NBA draft: 1992: 2nd round, 52nd overall pick
- Drafted by: Chicago Bulls
- Playing career: 1992–2000
- Position: Small forward
- Number: 6

Career history
- 1992: Tau Cerámica
- 1992–1993: Grand Rapids Hoops
- 1993: Rochester Renegade
- 1993–1996: Mitsubishi Diamond Dolphins
- 1996–1997: Quad City Thunder
- 1997: Chicago Bulls
- 1997–1998: Quad City Thunder
- 1998–2000: Rockford Lightning

Career highlights
- CBA champion (1998); McDonald's All-American (1988); Second-team Parade All-American (1988); Mr. Basketball of Michigan (1988)
- Stats at NBA.com
- Stats at Basketball Reference
Medals
Men's basketball
Representing United States
Pan American Games
Silver medal – second place	1999 Winnipeg	National team

Matthew Todd Steigenga (born March 27, 1970) is an American former professional basketball player. He was a 6'7", 220-40 lbs. small forward who most notably played a part of one season with the Chicago Bulls and a season in the Liga ACB. He is currently a broadcaster for Michigan State basketball games.

== Early life ==
Born in Grand Rapids, Michigan, Steigenga showed athletic ability at an early age, winning the 1979 National Football League Punt, Pass, and Kick competition.

== Basketball career ==
As a high schooler, Steigenga had starred for South Christian High School, leading them to the 1988 Michigan Class B title while being named Mr. Basketball of Michigan. In the year's McDonald's All American game, Steigenga won the slam dunk contest.

As a collegian, Steigenga started his final three years at Michigan State University, averaging 10.5 points and 4.3 rebounds per game in his four years. He finished the Spartans' 11th all-time leading scorer and currently stands 17th with 1296 career points, and was also the school's leading career shot blocker with 97 until 2008, when Drew Naymick surpassed this total. The Jud Heathcote-coached Spartans in 1990 won the Big Ten championship and reached the NCAA tournament sweet 16.

A second round pick of the Chicago Bulls in the 1992 NBA draft (52nd pick overall), Steigenga was signed late in the 1996-97 season when the Bulls needed to fill an injury-depleted roster. He appeared in two games playing a total of 12 minutes and scoring three points. Athletic, he scored his only field goal on an alley oop dunk, against the Toronto Raptors at the United Center.

Steigenga would again sign with the Bulls in January 1999, but was put on waivers a few weeks later, without appearing in any games. Despite playing so little, Steigenga was awarded an NBA championship ring as the Bulls, led by Michael Jordan and Scottie Pippen, won the 1997 NBA Championship.

Additionally, Steigenga played the 1995-96 pre-season with the Atlanta Hawks, but failed to make the regular season roster. From 1992 to 2000, the Bulls notwithstanding, he represented the CBA's Grand Rapids Hoops (1992–93), Rochester Renegade (1993), Quad City Thunder (1996–98) and Rockford Lightning (1998–2000), also playing abroad in Spain (Taugrés, 1993) and Japan (Mitsubishi Electric Melco Dolphins, 1995–96). He won a CBA championship with the Thunder in 1998.

At the international level, Steigenga was on the silver-medalist 1999 Pan American Games US team. He was also a member of NBA Ambassador teams who played in league championships in South America during the summer of 1999, and China the following summer.
