= Quad City Thunder =

- League: Continental Basketball Association (1987–2001)
- Founded: 1987
- Folded: 2001
- History: Quad City Thunder; 1987–2001
- Arena: Wharton Field House (1987–1993); The MARK of the Quad Cities (1993–2001)
- Location: Moline, Illinois
- Team colors: navy, orange
- Head coach: Mauro Panaggio (1987–1991); Dan Panaggio (1991–2000)
- Ownership: Anne Potter DeLong (1987–1996); Jay Gellerman Family (1996–2000); Isiah Thomas (2000–2001)
- Championships: 2 (1994, 1998)
- Website: www.qcthunder.com

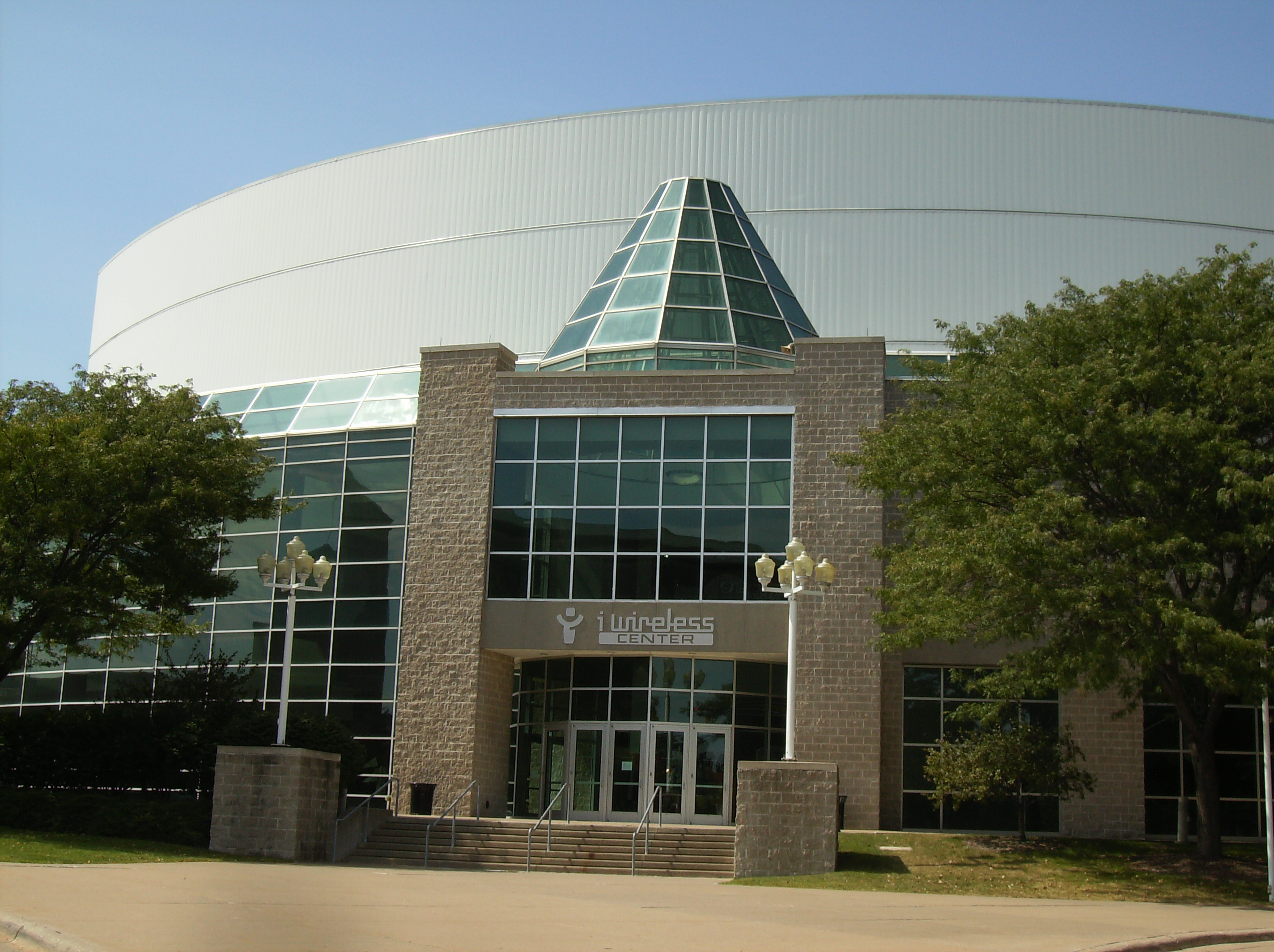
The MARK of the Quad Cities was home to the Quad City Thunder

The Quad City Thunder was a Continental Basketball Association (CBA) franchise that was based in the Quad Cities of Illinois and Iowa. They played in the CBA from the 1987–88 season until the CBA folded in 2001. The Thunder were successful on the court, capturing CBA championships in the 1993–94 and 1997–98 seasons, and runner-up in the 1990–91 season. The Thunder played in Moline, Illinois, first at Wharton Field House before moving to the new MARK of the Quad Cities in 1993.

== History ==
The Thunder first began play at the Wharton Field House in Moline, Illinois, (former home of the NBA's Tri-Cities Blackhawks) in the 1987–88 season, with 6,047 fans attending the first home game. The Thunder were the first professional basketball franchise in the Quad Cities since the Tri-Cities Blackhawks moved to Milwaukee, Wisconsin, in 1953. Initially a great success in the CBA, the Thunder struggled with attendance towards the end of their existence, especially with competition from their co-tenants at the Mark, the Quad City Mallards hockey team. The Thunder folded when the CBA ceased operations following the 2000–01 season.

== Championship seasons ==
=== 1993–1994 ===
The 1993–1994 team went 34–22 under Dan Panaggio. They swept through the playoffs. They first defeated the Rochester Renegades in overtime of a playoff play-in in Bismarck, N.D. They then defeated the Grand Rapids Hoops 4–1 in best-of-seven second round; Defeated the La Crosse Catbirds 4–0 in conference finals.

Finally, the Thunder defeated the Omaha Racers 4–1, winning last three on road to claim franchise’s first league title. The Thunder won the opener in double overtime after Tate George tied the game with last-second buckets at both the end of regulation and of the first overtime. The Thunder then lost the second game in triple overtime, but won three straight in Omaha, the last in overtime.

Chris Childs averaged 17.4 points and 8.5 assists in the playoffs, was the Finals MVP and went on to the National Basketball Association. Other key players were Harold Ellis 21.4ppg, Tate George 16.4, Bobby Martin 13.6, Barry Mitchell 13.0, Matt Fish 7.1RPG, Ashraf Amaya 6.9, and Cedric Henderson 6.1.

=== 1997–1998 ===
The 1997–98 Thunder finished 38–18 under Dan Panaggio. In the playoffs they swept the La Crosse Catbirds in three games and defeated the Rockford Lightning in five games.

In the CBA Finals, they won a deciding seventh at home over the Sioux Falls Skyforce to capture their second CBA Championship. Key players were: Jimmy King 16.4ppg, Jeff McInnis 14.9ppg, Alvin Sims 13.6ppg, Doug Smith 12.8ppg, Willie Burton 11.6, Byron Houston 8.7Rpg, and Barry Sumpter. King won league MVP, McInnis was Newcomer of the Year, Sims became the Thunder’s first Rookie of the Year and Dan Panaggio won his second Coach of the Year award.

=== Misc Notes ===
The Thunder and their fans enjoyed a spirited rivalry with the Rockford Lightning.

The Thunder's mascot was Thor, the Norse god of thunder.

Hall of Fame player George Gervin played for the Thunder during the 1989–90 season in a brief comeback attempt. His tenure highlighted by the December 13, 1989 matchup against his brother Derrick Gervin and his Santa Barbara team. In that game, George scored 43 points and Derrick 39 in a Thunder record 172-122 victory.

In 1992, history was made when, for the first time in the 45-year history of U.S. professional basketball, a father and son opposed one another as head coaches. Former Thunder Coach Mauro Panaggio went head to head against son Dan Panaggio when Mauro's Rockford Lightning played Dan's Quad City Thunder.

From 2002-04 five former Thunder players/coaches/staffers were with the NBA's Portland Trail Blazers simultaneously. Jeff McInnis (player), Maurice Cheeks (Head Coach), Dan Panaggio (assistant coach), Dave Cohen (Director of Sales) and Joe Bivona (Director of Game Operations).

== Quad City Thunder Personnel ==
=== Franchise Owners ===
Name	Seasons
Anne Potter DeLong	1987–1997
Jay Gellerman	1997–1999
Isiah Thomas	1999–2000
Matt Berglund	2000–2001

=== Franchise General Managers ===
#	Name	Seasons
1	Rich McArdle	1987–1993
2	Ed DeLong	1993–1994
3	Jim Meenan	1995–1996
4	Casey Kahler	1996–1997
5	Mike Weindruch	1997–1999
6	Fred Radunzel	1999–2000
7	Kim Evans	2000–2001

=== Franchise Coaches ===
#	Name	Term	Regular season				Playoffs				Achievements	Reference
#	Name	Term	GC	W	L	Win%	GC	W	L	Win%	Achievements	Reference
1	Mauro Panaggio	1987–1991	220	132	88	.600	33	15	18	.455		
2	Dan Panaggio	1991–2000	404	313	191	.775	71	41	30	.578		
3	Bob Thornton	2000–2001	21	8	13	.007	0	–	–	–		

=== Thunder CBA Most Valuable Player ===
Year	Player	Position	Reference
1992	Barry Mitchell	Forward	
1993	Derek Strong	Power Forward	
1998	Jimmy King	Shooting Guard	
2000	Jeff McInnis	Point Guard/Shooting Guard	

=== Thunder NBA Callups ===
1988–89

Player	Position	NBA Team	Reference
Kevin Gamble	Shooting Guard/Small Forward	Boston Celtics	
Bill Jones	Small Forward	New Jersey Nets	
Anthony Bowie	Shooting Guard/Small Forward	San Antonio Spurs	
Corey Gaines	Shooting Guard	New Jersey Nets	
Barry Sumpter	Power Forward	Los Angeles Clippers	

1989–90

Player	Position	NBA Teams	Reference
Nate Johnston	Power Forward/Small Forward	Portland Trail Blazers, Utah Jazz	
Kenny Gattison	Power Forward/ Center	Charlotte Hornets	

1990–91

Player	Position	NBA Team	Reference
A. J. Wynder	Point Guard	Boston Celtics	
Tony Harris	Shooting Guard	Philadelphia 76ers	

1991–92

Player	Position	NBA Team	Reference
Steve Scheffler	Center/Power Forward	Sacramento Kings	
Anthony Bowie	Shooting Guard/Small Forward	Orlando Magic	

1992–93

Player	Position	NBA Team	Reference
Derek Strong	Power Forward	Milwaukee Bucks	

1993–94

Player	Position	NBA Team	Reference
Harold Ellis	Shooting Guard	Los Angeles Clippers	
Morlon Wiley	Shooting Guard	Miami Heat	

1994–95

Player	Position	NBA Teams	Reference
Greg Sutton	Point Guard	Charlotte Hornets	
Kevin Pritchard	Point Guard	Philadelphia 76ers, Miami Heat	
Randolph Keys	Small Forward/Shooting Guard	Los Angeles Lakers, Milwaukee Bucks	
Tate George	Point Guard	Milwaukee Bucks	

1995–96

Player	Position	NBA Team	Reference
Kevin Pritchard	Point Guard	Washington Bullets	

1996–97

Player	Position	NBA Team	Reference
Joe Courtney	Power Forward	Philadelphia 76ers	
Erick Strickland	Point Guard/Power Forward	Dallas Mavericks	
Rich Manning	Center/Power Forward	Los Angeles Clippers	
Jimmy King	Shooting Guard	Denver Nuggets	
Matt Steigenga	Small Forward	Chicago Bulls	

1997–98

Player	Position	NBA Team	Reference
Litterial Green	Point Guard	Milwaukee Bucks	
Willie Burton	Small Forward	San Antonio Spurs	

1998–99

Player	Position	NBA Team	Reference
J.R. Henderson	Power Forward/Center	Vancouver Grizzlies	
Jeff McInnis	Point Guard/Shooting Guard	Washington Wizards	

1999–00

Player	Position	NBA Team	Reference
Jeff McInnis	Point Guard/Shooting Guard	Los Angeles Clippers	
Maceo Baston	Power Forward	Milwaukee Bucks	
Jamel Thomas	Shooting Guard/Small Forward	Boston Celtics, Portland Trail Blazers	

2000–01

Player	Position	NBA Team	Reference
John Coker	Center	Golden State Warriors	

1988–89

- Kevin Gamble, Boston
- Bill Jones, New Jersey
- Anthony Bowie, San Antonio
- Corey Gaines, New Jersey
- Barry Sumpter, L.A. Clippers

1989–90

- Nate Johnston, Portland, Utah
- Kenny Gattison, Charlotte

1990–91

- A. J. Wynder, Boston
- Tony Harris, Philadelphia

1991–92

- Steve Scheffler, Sacramento
- Anthony Bowie, Orlando

1992–93

- Derek Strong, Milwaukee

1993–94

- Harold Ellis, L.A. Clippers
- Morlon Wiley, Miami

1994–95

- Greg Sutton, Charlotte
- Kevin Pritchard, Philadelphia, Miami
- Randolph Keys, Lakers, Milwaukee
- Tate George, Milwaukee

1995–96

- Kevin Pritchard, Washington

1996–97

- Joe Courtney, Philadelphia
- Erick Strickland, Dallas
- Rich Manning, L.A. Clippers
- Jimmy King, Denver
- Matt Steigenga, Chicago

1997–98

- Litterial Green, Milwaukee
- Willie Burton, San Antonio

1998–99

- J.R. Henderson, Vancouver
- Jeff McInnis, Washington

1999-00

- Jeff McInnis, L.A. Clippers
- Maceo Baston, Milwaukee
- Jamel Thomas, Boston, Portland

2000–01

- John Coker, Golden State .

=== Quad City Thunder All-Time Roster ===
- Ashraf Amaya, 1993–94.
- Tim Anderson, 1990–91, 1992–93.
- Paul Atkins, 1989–90.
- Terrell Baker, 2000–01.
- Cedric Ball, 1996–97.
- Ken Bannister, 1987–88.
- Stephen Bardo, 1990–92.
- Maceo Baston, 1998–2000.
- Kenny Battle, 1994–95.
- Willie Bland, 1993–95.
- Dan Bingenheimer, 1992–93.
- Willie Bland, 1990–91.
- Lance Blanks, 1993–94.
- Herb Blunt, 1988–90.
- Anthony Bowie, 1987–89, 91–92.
- Donta Bright, 1996–97.
- Mark Brisker, 1992–93.
- Carl Brown, 1990–91.
- Tony Brown, 1990–91.
- Wiley Brown, 1989–90.
- Rick Brunson, 1996–97.
- Torgeir Bryn, 1989–90.
- Evers Burns, 1988–89.
- Isaac Burton, 1997–98.
- Willie Burton, 1997–98.
- Brent Carmichael, 1987–88.
- Ron Cavenall, 1989–90.
- Lorenzo Charles, 1988–89.
- Derrick Chievous, 1991–93.
- Chris Childs, 1992–94.
- Brian Christenson, 1987–88.
- Kipp Christianson, 2000–01.
- John Coker, 2000–01.
- Gary Collier, 1994–95.
- James Collins, 1998–99.
- Leroy Combs, 1987–88.
- Darwin Cook, 1991–92.
- Sean Couch, 1989–90.
- Joe Courtney, 1996–97.
- Herb Crook, 1988–89.
- Lloyd Daniels, 1989–90.
- Joel Debortoli, 1990–91.
- Terry Dozier, 1989–90.
- Nate Driggers, 1995–96.
- Ron Draper, 1990–91.
- Kenny Drummond, 1989–91, 92–93, 94–95.
- Marty Eggleston, 1989–90.
- Harold Ellis, 1992–94.
- LeRon Ellis, 1996–97.
- Kwame Evans, 1996–97.
- Matt Fish, 1993–94.
- Rod Foster, 1987–88.
- Reggie Fox, 1992–93.
- Reggie Freeman, 1998–99.
- Corey Gaines, 1988–89.
- Kevin Gamble, 1987–89.
- Ruben Garces, 1998–99.
- Chris Garner, 1999–2001.
- Keith Gatlin, 1988–90.
- Kenny Gattison, 1989–90.
- Sean Gay, 1996–97.
- Reggie Geary, 1998–99.
- Tate George, 1993–94, 95–96.
- George Gervin, 1989–90.
- Mike Gibson, 1987–88.
- Orlando Graham, 1990–91.
- Evric Gray, 1994–95.
- Jeff Grayer, 1998–99.
- Kenny Green, 1988–89.
- Ken A. Green, 1990–91.
- Litterial Green, 1994–96, 97–99.
- Gerald Greene, 1989–90.
- Clarence Grier, 1987–88.
- Scott Haffner, 1991–92.
- Emmet Hall, 1994–96.
- Ray Hall, 1987–89.
- Tony Harris, 1990–92.
- Jack Hartman, 2000–01.
- Earl Hayes, 1987–88.
- Cedric Henderson, 1987–89, 93–94, 95–96.
- David Henderson, 1990–91.
- J.R. Henderson, 1998–99.
- Phil Henderson, 1990–91, 92–93.
- Bakari Hendrix, 1998-00.
- Fred Herzog, 1998–99.
- Derrick Hicks, 1993–94.
- Rico Hill, 1999-00.
- Johnnie Hilliard, 1993–94.
- Kermit Holmes, 1997–99.
- Derek Hood, 1999-00.
- Anthony Houston, 1992–93.
- Byron Houston, 1997–98.
- Alfredrick Hughes, 1992–93.
- Anderson Hunt, 1994–96.
- Joe Hurst, 1987–88.
- Jermaine Jackson, 2000–01.
- Stanley Jackson, 1998–99.
- Trent Jackson, 1989–90.
- Justin Jennings, 1998-00.
- Kris Johnson, 1999-00.
- Nate Johnston, 1988–90.
- Bill Jones, 1989–90, 94–95.
- Greg Jones, 1987–88.
- Ozell Jones, 1987–88.
- Tony Karasek, 1988–89.
- Martin Keane, 1998–99.
- Michael Kennedy, 1987–88.
- Jonathan Kerner, 2000–01.
- Randolph Keys, 1993–95.
- Gerard King, 1995–96.
- Jimmy King, 1996–97, 98–00.
- Bruno Kongawoin, 1987–88.
- Eric Kubel, 2000–01.
- Jim Lampley, 1989–90.
- Andre Larry, 2000–01.
- Troy Lewis, 1988–90.
- Malcolm Mackey, 1999-00.
- Rich Manning, 1994–95, 96–98.
- Roy Marble, 1992–93.
- Bobby Martin, 1991–94, 99–00.
- Maurice Martin, 1989–90.
- Billy McCaffrey, 1996–97.
- Dwayne McClain, 1987–88.
- Paris McCurdy, 1995–96.
- Von McDade, 1991–92.
- Shawn McDaniel, 1992–93.
- Jeff McInnis, 1997-00.
- Carlton McKinney, 1989–90.
- Barry Mitchell, 1990–94.
- Alvin Mobley, 1995–96.
- Paul Mokeski, 1992–93.
- Greg Monroe, 1987–88.
- Dwight Moody, 1990–92.
- Tracy Moore, 1989–90.
- Richard Morton, 1993–94.
- Troy Muilenberg, 1991–93.
- Robert Mukes, 1990–91.
- Pete Myers, 1998–99.
- Bill Nelson, 1988–89.
- Melvin Newbern, 1990–91.
- Jimmy Oliver, 1996–97.
- Alexander Okunsky, 1993–94.
- Townsend Orr, 1998–99.
- Anthony Parker, 1999-00.
- Jesse Pate, 1996–99.
- Andre Patterson, 1987–88.
- Kenny Patterson, 1987–88.
- Jon Pearcy 1998–99.
- Russell Pierre, 1987–88.
- Kurt Portmann, 1995–97.
- Kevin Pritchard, 1994–96.
- Donte Quinine, 2000–01.
- Ken Redfield, 1993–94.
- Brian Reese, 1994–95.
- Richard Rellford, 1996–97.
- Lafester Rhodes, 1988–90.
- David Robinson, 1995–96.
- Jackie Robinson, 1996–97.
- Keith Robinson, 1990–92.
- Mark Robinson, 1990–91.
- Lou Roe, 1999-00.
- Rob Rose, 1991–92.
- Clifford Rozier, 1997–99.
- Darren Sanderlin, 1991–92.
- Derrick Sanders, 1987–88.
- Chris Sandle, 1988–89.
- Steve Scheffler, 1991–92, 98–99.
- Larry Scovens, 87–89.
- Tom Sheehey, 1991–92.
- Alvin Sims, 1997–98, 99–00.
- Lazarus Sims, 1998-89.
- Jose Slaughter, 1989–90.
- Doug Smith, 1997–99.
- LaBradford Smith, 1994–96.
- Matt Steigenga, 1996–98.
- Larry Stewart 1995–96.
- Marcus Stokes, 1994–95, 97–98.
- Erick Strickland, 1996–97.
- Derek Strong, 1992–93.
- Lamont Strothers, 1993–94.
- Kelby Stuckey, 1995–96.
- Barry Sumpter, 1988–89, 90–93, 94–99.
- Dirkk Surles, 1993–94.
- Greg Sutton, 1997–98.
- Shon Tarver, 1994–95.
- Jay Taylor, 1994–96.
- Robert W. Taylor 1989–1992
- Jamel Thomas, 1999–2000
- Tom Thompson, 1988–89.
- Mark Tillmon, 1990–91.
- Kelvin Upshaw, 1996–97.
- Mark Wade, 1987–88.
- Milt Wagner, 1990–91.
- Jamie Waller, 1987–88.
- Jay Webb, 1993–95.
- Demone Webster, 1990–91.
- Kelsey Weems, 1989–90.
- Tyson Wheeler, 1999-00.
- Chuckie White, 1996–97.
- Mitchell Wiggins, 1987–88.
- Morlon Wiley, 1993–94, 95–96, 97–98.
- Eddie Lee Wilkins, 1987–88.
- Travis Williams, 1998–99.
- Greg Wiltjer, 1990–1991; 1993–94.
- Steve Woodberry, 1996–97.
- Randy Woods, 1996–97.
- Steve Woodside, 1987–88.
- Blake Wortham, 1987–88.
- A. J. Wynder, 1990–92.
- Perry Young, 1987–90.
