= Savannah Spirits =

- Leagues: Continental Basketball Association
- Founded: 1986; 40 years ago
- History: Detroit Spirits; 1982–1986; Savannah Spirits; 1986–1988; Tulsa Fast Breakers; 1988–1991; Tulsa Zone; 1991–1992; Fargo-Moorhead Fever; 1992–1994; Mexico City Aztecas; 1994–1995; San Diego Wildcards; 1995–96 (Disbanded mid-season, January 5, 1996)
- Arena: Savannah Civic Center
- Location: Savannah, Georgia
- President: Reginald Henderson
- Vice-presidents: General Manager, Robb Larson
- Head coach: Charley Rosen

The Savannah Spirits were a professional basketball team that played for two years in the Continental Basketball Association (CBA) from 1986 to 1988, amassing a total regular season record of 42 wins and 60 losses for a total of 306.5 points. The team originally began play in the 1982–1983 season as the Detroit Spirits, after Agustin Arbulu acquired the franchise, compiling a record of 26–18, winning the Central Division title; they defeated the Rochester Zeniths for the Conference title and the Montana Golden Nuggets for the CBA title. After their initial season Agustin Arbulu agreed to sell the franchise to Reggie Henderson. The Spirits did not qualify for the postseason in their first year in Savannah, Georgia. In their second and final year in Savannah, they were eliminated by the Albany Patroons in the first round, four games to one.

Future late-night talk show host Craig Kilborn served as the team's radio play-by-play announcer. It was the first broadcasting job of his career.

== Detroit Spirits (1982–86) ==
On May 24, 1982, Continental Basketball Association (CBA) spokesperson Fran Greenburg announced that Detroit, Michigan had been awarded an expansion franchise by the league's board of directors.

The Detroit Spirits set a CBA record for team rebounds with 80 during a 107–101 loss to the Ohio Mixers on January 4, 1983.

There was a 37-minute delay during a game in Detroit, Michigan between the Detroit Spirits and the Albany Patroons on January 16, 1983, after spirits forward Francois Wise shattered a backboard on a baseline dunk at the 11:24 mark of the third quarter. Wise suffered "minor cuts" as described by the UPI and was ejected from the game.

Spirits forward Marvin Barnes was suspended two games and fined $100 on February 19, 1983, for what the CBA determined was a flagrant elbow against Ohio Mixers forward DeWayne Scales. Barnes was ejected from the game at which point he removed his jersey and threw it on his bench while exiting the floor. According to Barnes he only threw the elbow in retaliation to Scales striking him in the back. A week later Barnes was suspended by the team for the rest of the season after missing two scheduled practices according to Spirits general manager Sam Washington who told the UPI, "I suspended him the rest of the season so he won't be obligated to be at practice and games and we won't be obligated to look for him [...] He's complained about the leg since the surgery, and we set up a program for him [...] He went two or three times. [...] He's just not dependable [...] and I'm sick and tired of it. [...] The problem is with Marvin, as with a lot of athletes, that in high school, college and even the pros, he's had people cater to him [...] That's what he wants and, I guess, expects." Barnes responded telling the UPI, "I was at the house taking care of some other things [...] Sam [Washington] and I are friends and there are no hard feelings".

In April 1985 Spirits owner Reggie Henderson told the Michigan Chronicle that he was looking to re-locate his franchise to Muskegon, Michigan; Flint, Michigan; or Toledo, Ohio. Henderson said that the lease on their facilities was too high and a smaller market could accommodate his team better. He claimed the spirits lost $700,000 during the 1984–85 season. The team averaged 800 spectators at home games during the season. In spite of this team vice president Robb Larson announced on July 3, 1985, they were close to finalizing a lease to use the University of Detroit's Calihan Hall.

== Franchise history post-Savannah ==
After relocating to Tulsa, Oklahoma and changing their name to the Tulsa Fast Breakers, the team won the 1988–89 CBA Championship under Head Coach Henry Bibby. The franchise would have a name change to the Tulsa Zone before they eventually moved again to Fargo, North Dakota. Another move would send the team to Mexico City where they became the Mexico City Aztecas and the on to San Diego. The team would fold during the 1995–1996 season while playing as the San Diego Wildcards.

== Season-by-season records ==
Season	Games	Wins	Losses	Win %	Ref
1982–83	44	26	18	.591	
1983–84	44	26	18	.591	
1984–85	48	23	25	.479	
1985–86	48	24	24	.500	
1986–87	48	20	28	.417	
1987–88	54	22	32	.407	
1988–89	54	28	26	.519	
1989–90	56	31	25	.554	
1990–91	56	34	22	.607	
1991–92	56	24	32	.429	
1992–93	56	18	38	.321	
1993–94	56	25	31	.446	
1994–95	56	19	37	.339	
1995–96	21	4	17	.190	
