= Mexico Aztecas =

- Leagues: Continental Basketball Association
- Founded: 1982 (as Detroit Spirits)
- Arena: Palacio de los Deportes
- Location: Mexico City, Mexico
- President: Doug Logan
- Head coach: Mack Calvin

The Mexico Aztecas (or Mexico City Aztecs, Aztecas de México) were a professional basketball team in the Continental Basketball Association (CBA). Created as an experiment in fielding a team outside the United States and Canada, it played one season, the 1994–95 season.

== History ==
One of the largest cities in the Western Hemisphere, Mexico City has a significant fan interest in basketball. In 1994, the owner of the Fargo-Moorhead Fever, Doug Logan, decided to move his team to the Mexican capital; in earlier incarnations, the club had played as the Detroit Spirits (1982/83 to 1985/86), the Savannah Spirits (1986/87 to 1987/88), the Tulsa Fast Breakers (1988/89 to 1990/91) and the Tulsa Zone (1991/92).

The Aztecas played their home games at the Palacio de los Deportes (Sports Palace), where they were supported by a popular cheerleading squad. This was the same facility in which the United States basketball team won the gold medal in the 1968 Olympics. Mack Calvin was named the new head coach and general manager. The Aztecas opened their season on November 18, 1994, at the Oklahoma City Cavalry. Two days later, they went on to delight their fans with a 90-88 win over the Chicago Rockers in their first home game. Attendance at the Palacio was 8,295.

During the season, the Aztecas produced at least two NBA call-ups, Steve Henson in early November and Greg Grant in 1995. The Aztecas also drafted Andy Olivarez, formerly of USC and a member of the Mexico National Team, and is considered the best player in CIMEBA and on the national team them. On February 10, 1995 the team lost 159-154 to the Tri-City Chinook in double overtime; this, despite the fact that Mexico City was nearly one hundred times the size of the Chinook's home of Kennewick, Washington, possibly the largest disparity in North American sports history.

Despite a 19-37 record (lost tie-breaker), the Aztecas' home attendance was huge by CBA standards, with several announced crowds over 9,000. In their final home game of the season, they beat the Omaha Racers 124-109 before 12,587 fans, an all-time record for the CBA. But it wasn't enough to keep the team south of the border. In December 1994, the Mexican peso crashed, losing half of its value against the U.S. dollar, ultimately costing over a million Mexicans their jobs in the recession that followed. Most of the Aztecas' expenses, primarily player salaries, were in American dollars, but revenues, including ticket sales, were in the now devalued peso. Logan could not afford another season in Mexico. On September 20, 1995, the Aztecas announced their move to San Diego, as the San Diego Wildcards. They played just 21 games there (with a 4-17 record in front of much smaller crowds than the ones in Mexico) before folding in January 1996.

== Roster ==
- Dexter Boney
- Fred Vinson
- Mark Boyd
- Craig Brown
- Joey Brown
- Luther Burks
- Demetrius Calip
- James Carter
- Derrick Chandler
- Joe Courtney
- Greg Grant
- Al Hamilton
- Steve Henson
- Alex Holcombe
- Kermit Holmes
- Byron Irvin
- Ryan Lorthridge
- Jorge Manzano
- Alan Ogg
- Andy Olivarez
- Scott Paddock
- Stan Rose
- Leonard White
