= D.L. Ligon Coliseum =

Athletic center in Midwestern State University, Wichita Falls, Texas, USA

Coordinates: 33.8719°N 98.5196°W

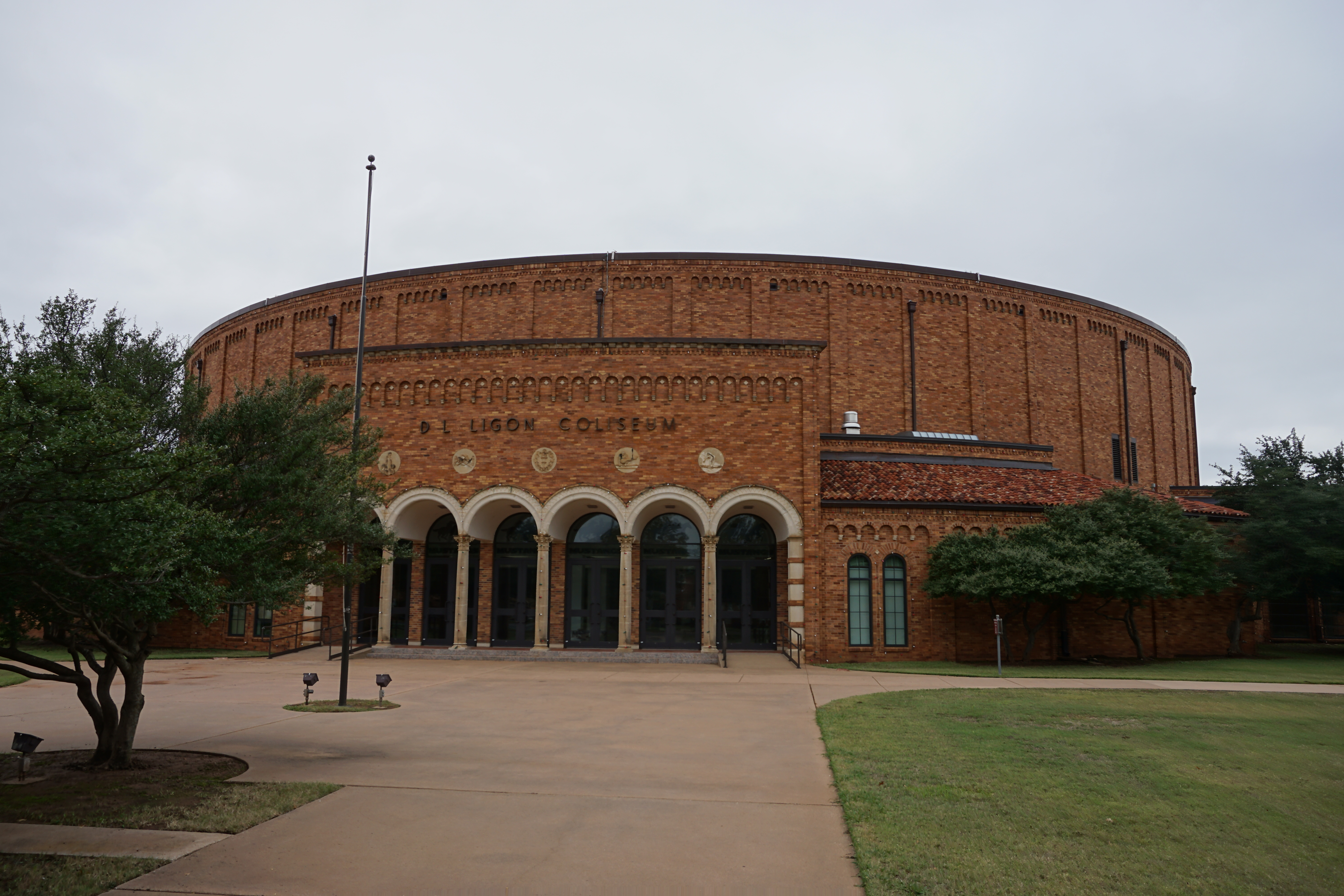
D.L. Ligon Coliseum in October 2015

D.L. Ligon Coliseum has been home to the Midwestern State University athletic department for 53 years, and it is the site of all MSU home basketball and volleyball events.

Built in 1969, the facility was renamed from MSU Coliseum to D.L. Ligon Coliseum on October 18, 1975 in honor of the legendary MSU employee. Ligon served in many capacities during his 50-plus years at MSU, including stints as acting president, vice president, professor, coach and sports information director.

The 3,640-seat arena is air-conditioned and has a hardwood playing surface. The building also features a practice gymnasium, weight room, wellness center, training room, locker rooms and classrooms, as well as MSU's athletic offices.

On November 22, 2002, the playing court in the Coliseum was officially named Gerald Stockton Court in honor of Dr. Gerald Stockton, who led MSU from 1970–1994 to a 493–328 record with his "Dome Magic".
