= San Diego Wildcards =

- Leagues: Continental Basketball Association
- Established: 1995
- Folded: 1996
- Arena: San Diego Sports Arena
- Capacity: 14,500
- Location: San Diego, California
- Main sponsor: Viejas Casino
- Head coach: Mauro Panaggio
- Ownership: Doug Logan

The San Diego Wildcards were a men's professional basketball team based in San Diego, California, that competed in the Continental Basketball Association (CBA) during the 1995–96 season. The team played its home games at the San Diego Sports Arena. The team was owned by sports executive Doug Logan and coached by Mauro Panaggio, who has the most wins as a coach in CBA history. The team folded on January 5, 1996 after placing a 4–17 record.

== History ==
The team was brought to San Diego in 1995 after their predecessor, the Mexico Aztecas, folded. Southern California would prove to be the last stop for the franchise, which went through various incarnations in different cities since 1982: Detroit; Savannah, Georgia; Tulsa; Fargo, North Dakota and Mexico City.

In September 1995 it was announced that the team's nickname would be the "Wildcards". The name came from the franchise's principal sponsor Viejas Casino. who had their name on the team's jersey. At a press conference announcing the sponsorship, team owner Doug Logan wore multi-colored glasses with bells attached, resembling a Joker, the team's mascot.

In an effort to boost ticket sales, a Wildcards radio advertisement claimed CBA games would be more entertaining than college basketball or Los Angeles Clippers games. During broadcasts of the Los Angeles Lakers games on KSWB-TV the Wildcards hosted "one-minute ticket telethons" hosted by broadcaster Chris Ello.

Mauro Panaggio was hired as the team's head coach. Panaggio, who had coached in the CBA for 14 seasons and had more wins than any coach in league history, warned the media that the team may have trouble catching on, stating, "No one should get too comfortable here. If they aren't producing, they will have a short stay in San Diego." Panaggio was originally hired for a front office position, but he stepped into the head coaching role after being told by Logan that he could not find anyone to fill the vacancy.

Jarvis Basnigh was selected by San Diego during the 1995 CBA dispersal draft. The Wildcards chose three players during the 1995 CBA draft: Dwight Stewart out of Arkansas, Mike Williams from UMass, and Brian Fair from UConn.

=== 1995-96 season ===
The Wildcards first game was at the San Diego Sports Arena on November 17, 1995 against the Chicago Rockers; the Wildcards won, 108-106, on guard Kareem Townes' game-winning bucket with six seconds left. Mark Zeigler of The San Diego Union-Tribune wrote, "They had a professional basketball game last night at the Sports Arena and — here's the weird part — people were actually standing and cheering. For the home team." But attendance that first night was only 3,310, in the 14,800-seat San Diego Sports Arena.

Veteran NBA and CBA guard Greg Grant, who had been with the franchise in Mexico, played only one game with the Wildcards (with three points and nine assists) before being signed by the Philadelphia 76ers on November 21, 1995.

After the opening night win, though, the 'Cards were decked on a regular basis, losing ten of their next eleven games. Attendance remained low, causing concern that the team would have to move (again) or fold outright. San Diego's general manager Jeff Quinn told The San Diego Union-Tribune, "We're substantially less [in attendance] than I would have thought we would be right now. I would have thought we'd have been drawing somewhere around 3,000. I'm a little mystified. I don't know the answer right now."

Panaggio's "short stay in San Diego" comment proved to be prophetic: on January 5, 1996, the Wildcards officially ceased operations. Team owner Doug Logan claimed the team lost $35,000 per week. The team's final record was 4–17.

== Roster ==
San Diego Wildcards roster
Players

Pos.	No.	Player	Height	Weight	DOB	From
G	3	(United States)	Kareem Townes	6 ft 4 in (1.93 m)	180 lb (82 kg)		La Salle
G	10	(United States)	Greg Grant	5 ft 7 in (1.70 m)	145 lb (66 kg)		TCNJ
G	12	(United States)	A. J. Wynder	6 ft 2 in (1.88 m)	185 lb (84 kg)		Fairfield
F	23	(United States)	Marc Carter	6 ft 8 in (2.03 m)	200 lb (91 kg)		San Diego State
F	32	(United States)	Canaan Chatman	6 ft 8 in (2.03 m)	210 lb (95 kg)		Portland
G	34	(United States)	Brian Fair	6 ft 4 in (1.93 m)	205 lb (93 kg)		Connecticut
F	35	(United States)	Leonard White	6 ft 7 in (2.01 m)	218 lb (99 kg)		Southern
F	44	(United States)	Kevin Brooks	6 ft 8 in (2.03 m)	200 lb (91 kg)		Louisiana
F	45	(United States)	Joey Johnson	6 ft 4 in (1.93 m)	195 lb (88 kg)		Arizona State
F	50	(United States)	Dwight Stewart	6 ft 9 in (2.06 m)	265 lb (120 kg)		Arkansas
C	55	(United States)	Scott Paddock	6 ft 10 in (2.08 m)	245 lb (111 kg)		Notre Dame
F		(United States)	Jarvis Basnight	6 ft 8 in (2.03 m)	200 lb (91 kg)		UNLV
F		(United States)	Ken McClary	6 ft 8 in (2.03 m)	250 lb (113 kg)		Florida
G/F		(United States)	Jimmy Oliver	6 ft 5 in (1.96 m)	205 lb (93 kg)		Purdue
C		(United States)	Rodney Dent	6 ft 11 in (2.11 m)	245 lb (111 kg)		Kentucky
G		(United States)	Cedric Hunter	6 ft 0 in (1.83 m)	180 lb (82 kg)		Kansas
F		(United States)	Evric Gray	6 ft 7 in (2.01 m)	235 lb (107 kg)		UNLV

Coaches
Head coach
- (United States) Mauro Panaggio (SUNY–Brockport)

Legend
- (DP) Unsigned draft pick
- (FA) Free agent
- (S) Suspended
- Injured
