= Rockford Lightning =

American basketball team

- Leagues: IBL 2000–2001; CBA 1979–2000 & 2001–2006
- Founded: 1978
- Folded: 2006
- History: Lancaster Red Roses; 1978–1980; Philadelphia Kings; 1980–1981; Lancaster Lightning; 1981–1985; Baltimore Lightning; 1985–1986; Rockford Lightning; 1986–2006
- Arena: Rockford MetroCentre
- Championships: 0
Home	Away

The Rockford Lightning were a professional basketball team based in Rockford, Illinois. The team played at Rockford MetroCentre and competed in the Continental Basketball Association (CBA) for most of its Rockford tenure; it spent the 2000–01 season in the International Basketball League (IBL).

== History ==
The franchise entered the CBA as the Lancaster Red Roses in the 1978–79 season. It subsequently played as the Philadelphia Kings, Lancaster Lightning and Baltimore Lightning before moving to Rockford for the 1986–87 season.

The Lightning made an immediate postseason run in 1986–87, winning the Western Division playoffs before losing the CBA championship series to the Rapid City Thrillers, four games to one. They returned to the final in 1988–89 but were swept in four games by the Tulsa Fast Breakers.

In April 1993, a group of Rockford investors announced an agreement to acquire the franchise from its nonlocal owners. The group said that it would retain coach Mauro Panaggio and keep the team in Rockford.

In October 1999, CBA owner Isiah Thomas owned all nine league franchises, including the Lightning.

When the CBA suspended play during the 2000–01 season, Rockford was among the former CBA teams that entered the IBL. After the CBA was reorganized later in 2001, the Lightning returned to the league.

The Lightning reached the CBA championship game again in 2002, losing 116–109 to the Dakota Wizards. In 2005, the Sioux Falls Skyforce defeated Rockford 135–126 in Game 4 to win the CBA championship and the series, 3–1.

The Lightning went 30–18 in 2005–06 and were seeded second in the CBA's Eastern Conference by the league's quarter-point system. It went 1–2 in the three-game, first-round round robin and did not advance to the CBA Finals.

In January 2006, the club announced that it would cease operations at the close of the season.

== NBA call-ups ==
- Bruce Bowen (1995–97) – Miami Heat, Boston Celtics, Philadelphia 76ers, San Antonio Spurs
- Sam Mack – Vancouver Grizzlies
- Gerald Madkins – Golden State Warriors
- Earl Boykins (1998–99)
- Matt Steigenga
- Linton Johnson
- Darrell Walker (coach)
- Mike James
- Larry Sykes
- Desmond Ferguson
- Howard Eisley
- Ken Bannister
- Kornél Dávid

Ralph Sampson also played for the Rockford Lightning during the 1994–95 CBA season before retiring.
