= Continental Basketball Association =

Defunct men's basketball minor league

Continental Basketball Association (CBA)
- Sport: Basketball
- Founded: April 23, 1946; 80 years ago
- Folded: June 1, 2009; 17 years ago
- Country: USA
- Continent: FIBA Americas (Americas)
- Last champion: Lawton-Fort Sill Cavalry (3rd title)
- Most titles: Allentown Jets; Wilkes-Barre Barons (8 titles each)

The Continental Basketball Association (CBA), originally known as the Eastern Pennsylvania Basketball League, and later as the Eastern Professional Basketball League and the Eastern Basketball Association, was a men's professional basketball minor league in the United States from 1946 to 2009.

== History ==
=== 20th century ===
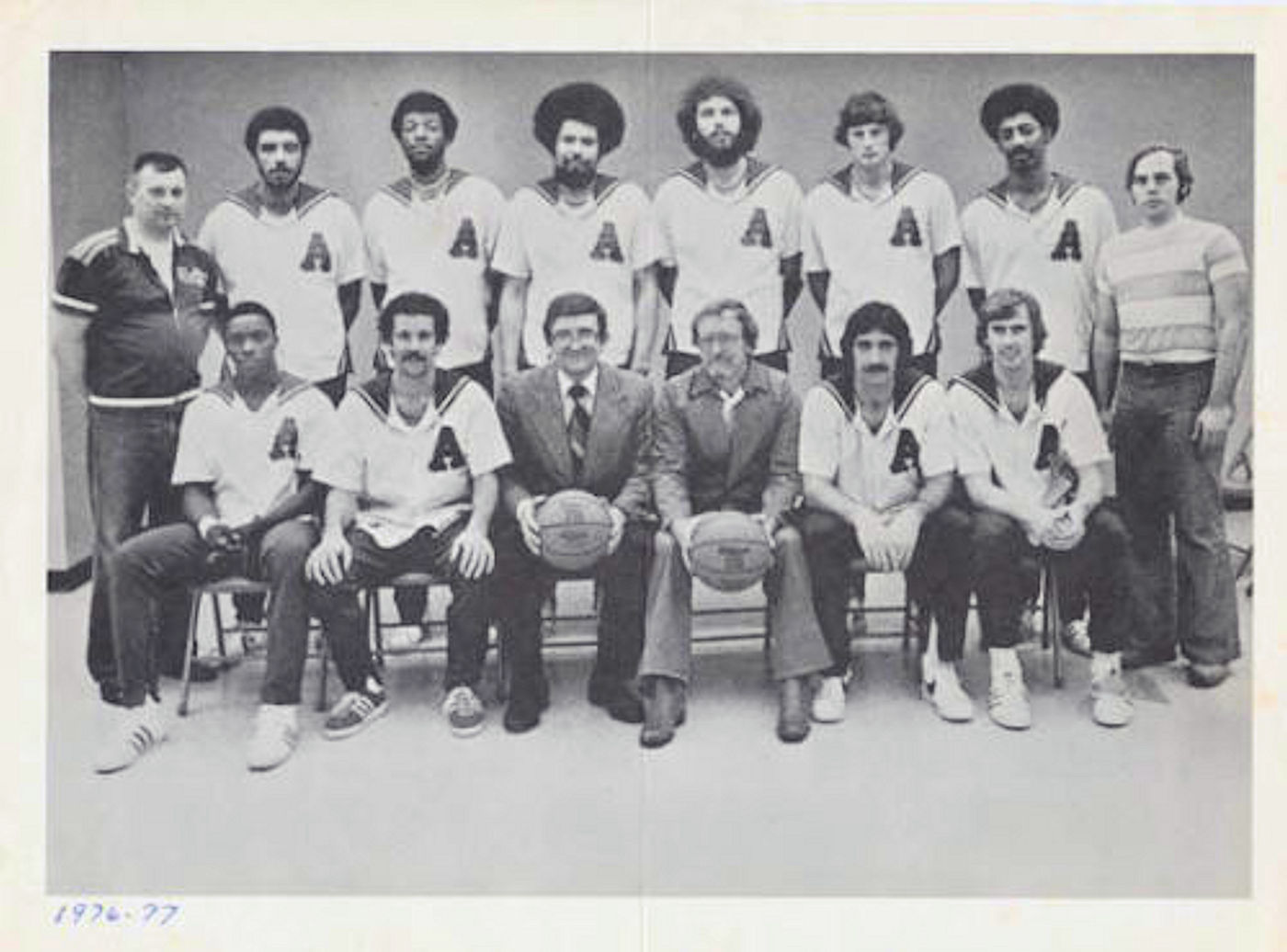
The 1976 Allentown Jets; the Allentown Jets and Wilkes-Barre Barons both won eight league titles, the most of any CBA team in the league's 63-year history.

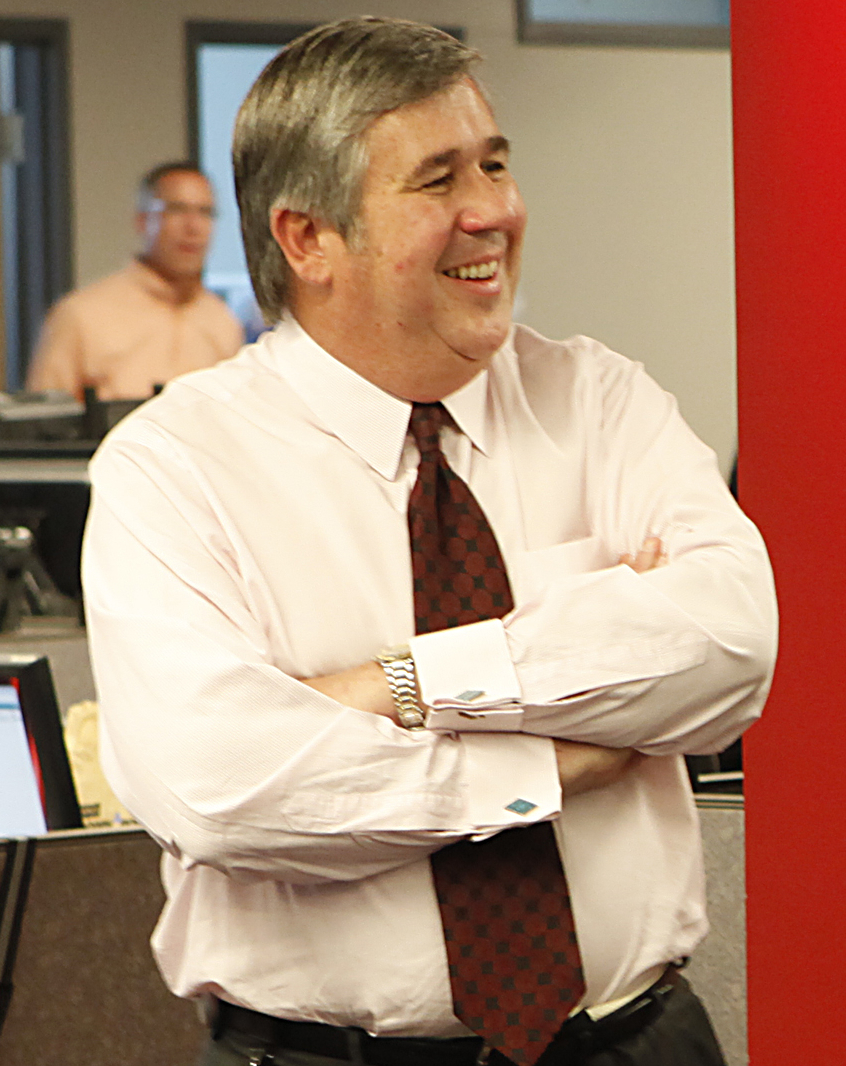
Bob Ley, the CBA's play-by-play announcer for ESPN

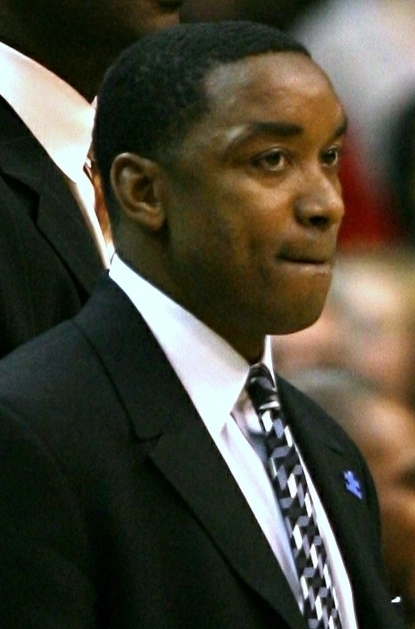
In August 1999, Isiah Thomas led a group of investors who acquired the CBA

The Continental Basketball Association was founded on April 23, 1946, under its previous name, the Eastern Pennsylvania Basketball League. It was organized on in Hazleton, Pennsylvania by Eddie White of Wilkes-Barre, Pennsylvania, Robert Jamelli of Hazleton and Ron Regar of Reading, Pennsylvania. George Z. Keller of Wilkes-Barre was the league's first commissioner. It later went on to bill itself as the "World's Oldest Professional Basketball League", since its founding pre-dated the founding of the Basketball Association of America (now National Basketball Association) by two months. The league fielded six franchises, five of which were in Pennsylvania: Allentown, Hazleton, Lancaster, Reading, and Wilkes-Barre. A sixth team, Binghamton, was located in New York, but moved to Pottsville in Pennsylvania mid-season. The first season opened on December 1, 1946.

The following season, Allentown withdrew from the EPBL, and the Wilkes-Barre team was sold to Williamsport. Teams were added in Philadelphia, Harrisburg and Sunbury, making eight teams in the EPBL that year.

In 1948, the league was renamed the Eastern Professional Basketball League, and additional franchises were added in three additional Pennsylvania cities, Williamsport, Scranton, and Sunbury, three New Jersey cities, Trenton, Camden, and Asbury Park, three in Connecticut, New Haven, Hartford, Bridgeport, and in Wilmington, Delaware, and Springfield, Massachusetts.

From the 1950s through the 1960s, many NBA teams had unofficial quotas on the number of black players on their teams. Many players joined other professional leagues, including the EPBL. The league was fast and physical, often played in tiny, smoke-filled gyms across the Northeastern United States, and featuring the best players who could not make many NBA teams because of the quotas.

Following the lead of the American Basketball League (1961–1962) in adding a three-point line, the Eastern League added a three-point line for its 1964–65 season. Although three-point shots during the 1960s were few and far between, the Eastern League developed several scorers who used the three-point shot to their advantage.

For the 1970–71 season, the league rebranded itself the Eastern Basketball Association, operating as a professional Northeastern regional league and as an unofficial feeder system to the NBA and ABA. The CBA's first commissioner was Harry Rudolph, father of NBA referee Mendy Rudolph. Steve A. Kauffman, currently a basketball agent, succeeded Rudolph as commissioner in 1975. Kauffman executed a plan to bring the Anchorage Northern Knights into the league beginning with the 1977–78 season. Kauffman kept the league name because he felt having a team in the Eastern League from Alaska might get the league additional notice and recognition. The establishment of the Anchorage franchise garnered national media attention, including a feature story in Sports Illustrated.

Kauffman served as commissioner until 1978, when his deputy commissioner, Jim Drucker, took the reins. Drucker's eight-season reign was the longest in the league's history. Drucker, son of NBA referee Norm Drucker, continued as commissioner until 1986.

As commissioner, the league was renamed the Continental Basketball Association in 1978, eventually leading to expansion across the country.

During Drucker's term, the league expanded from 8 to 14 teams, landed its first national TV contracts and saw franchise values increase from $5,000 to $500,000, an aggregate increase in equity value from $24,000 to $7 million. The league instituted novel rule changes including sudden-death overtime, a no foul-out rule and a change in the way league standings were determined. Under the "7-Point System", seven points were awarded each game: three points for winning a game and one point for every quarter a team won. As a result, a winning team would wind up with four to seven points in the standings, while a losing team could collect from zero to three points. This made for at least some fan interest even in the late stages of games that were otherwise blowouts; the trailing team could still get a standings point by winning the final quarter, especially if the team that was leading chose to rest some or all of its starters. The league used this method to calculate division standings from its implementation in 1983 until the league's end in 2009.

After Darryl Dawkins shattered two basketball backboards during the 1979–80 NBA season, the NBA used the CBA to test an innovation as part of the basket, the breakaway rim, in the 1980–81 CBA season. Three designs were chosen to be used in games, being chosen from ten prototype designs. Several college basketball players were asked to try to break the rims before being introduced in the CBA. When force was placed upon the spring-loaded rim, it would be pulled down, then spring safely back in place. The NBA and CBA adopted the most resilient design among the three for the 1981–82 season.

Also during this time, the CBA created a series of halftime promotions. The most successful was the "1 Million Dollar CBA Supershot". In an era where the typical basketball halftime promotion, even in NCAA Division I and the NBA, featured a winning prize worth less than $100, the CBA's Supershot, created in 1983, offered a grand prize of $1 million if a randomly selected fan could hit one shot from the far foul line, 69.75 feet (21.26 m). No one won the insured prize, but the shot attracted national media coverage in Sports Illustrated, The New York Times, and The Sporting News.

In 1984, the CBA signed a cable television contract with BET with 10 CBA games televised on a tape delay. For national media attention, the league created the "CBA Sportscaster Contest" to select a color commentator for its BET telecasts. With tryouts nationwide, the promotion was featured on the NBC Nightly News, Entertainment Tonight, Sports Illustrated and other media. The contest was won by a NJ high school basketball coach, Bill Lange, who later coached the Philadelphia Spirit minor league team in the United States Basketball League.

After two tape-delayed seasons on BET, CBA games moved to ESPN, with 13 games televised live. ESPN sportscaster Bob Ley did the play-by-play and former NBA player and coach Kevin Loughery provided color commentary. Drucker left as Commissioner, and his TV production company, Global Sports, produced the ESPN telecasts.

In 1985, the CBA followed with the "Ton-of-Money Free Throw", which featured a prize of 2,000 pounds (910 kg) of pennies ($5,000) if a randomly selected fan could make just one free throw. Two of fourteen contestants were successful. The next year, the league featured the "Easy Street Shootout". In that shootout, 14 contestants, one from each CBA city, were selected and the person making the longest shot won a $1,000,000 zero-coupon bond. The winner was Don Mattingly of the Evansville Thunder, unrelated to the New York Yankee baseball player. After the league's 1985 All-Star Game in Casper, Wyoming, the CBA invited fans to make a paper airplane from the centerfold of their game program, each identified with a unique serial number, and attempt to throw it through the moon roof of a new Ford Thunderbird parked at mid-court. Four fans were successful and a tie-breaker determined the winner who drove home with the new $17,000 car.

In August 1999, the CBA's teams were purchased by an investment group led by former NBA star Isiah Thomas. The group bought all of the individually owned franchises of the CBA, in a $10 million acquisition. Over the course of the next 18 months, Thomas was faced with a plethora of business troubles, losing the league's partnership with the NBA and ultimately abandoning the league into a blind trust that left teams unable to meet payroll or pay bills. The combined-ownership plan was unsuccessful and, by 2001, the CBA had declared bankruptcy and ceased operations; it folded on February 8, 2001, without managing to complete the 2000–01 season.

=== 21st century ===
Before the 2000–01 season, the CBA signed a television contract with BET to broadcast up to 18 games, including the CBA All-Star Game, although the CBA folded midway through the season. Several of its teams briefly joined the now-defunct International Basketball League.

Highlights of Thomas's ownership of the CBA included:

- August 3, 1999: Former NBA star Isiah Thomas purchases the CBA (the entire league including all the teams and its marketing entity, CBA Properties) for $10 million. He says that the league will now operate as a single-owner entity, and the CBA will continue to be the official developmental league of the NBA.
- October 7, 1999: Sale of the CBA to Thomas is finalized. Thomas pays $5 million up front, agreeing to make four additional payments to the CBA's former team owners for the remainder of the debt.
- October 24, 1999: He announces salary cuts in the CBA. The average salary of $1,500 per week will be reduced to $1,100, with rookies getting $800. Thomas' reasoning is that by reducing the number of veterans in the league, there will be more young players available for NBA teams.
- March 2000: The NBA offers Thomas $11 million plus a percentage of the profits for the CBA. Thomas chooses not to sell.
- June 28, 2000: Thomas is offered the head coaching job of the NBA's Indiana Pacers. Since NBA rules forbid a coach from owning his own league (as it would be a conflict of interest), Thomas is obliged to sell the CBA. On this day, Thomas signs a letter of intent to sell the CBA to the NBA Players' Association.
- Summer 2000: After 20 years of using the CBA as its developmental league, the NBA announces it will form its own minor-league feeder system, creating the National Basketball Development League (later the NBA Development League). The CBA will no longer be the NBA's official developmental league following the end of the 2001 season.
- October 2, 2000: Thomas places the league into a blind trust and becomes head coach of the Pacers.
- February 8, 2001: The CBA suspends play midway through the 2000–2001 season. The blind trust that had hoped to find a new owner for the league abandons its efforts, and the league has over $2 million in debts. The teams are offered back to their original owners for a $1 simple consideration, and several owners accept the offer. Many more refuse, and their clubs go under.
- February 24, 2001: The CBA declares bankruptcy. Five former CBA team owners repurchase their franchises and join the rival International Basketball League (IBL) to finish the season. Other owners choose to allow their franchises to fail, rather than cover debts that were not theirs originally.
- Summer 2001: The IBL folds.
- November 2001: The CBA reorganizes for the 2001–02 season as former CBA franchises in Rockford, Gary, Grand Rapids and Sioux Falls merge with the smaller International Basketball Association (IBA), which has franchises in Bismarck (Dakota Wizards), Fargo (Fargo-Moorhead Beez) and Saskatoon (Saskatchewan Hawks). The Flint (Michigan) Fuze join as an expansion team.
- November 16, 2001: The first game in the history of the National Basketball Developmental League is played.

In fall 2001, CBA and IBL teams merged with the International Basketball Association and purchased the assets of the defunct CBA (including its name, logo and records) from the bankruptcy trustee and resumed operations as the CBA, assuming the former league's identity and history. The league obtained eight new franchises (for a total of ten) for the 2006 season. The Atlanta Krunk Wolverines and Vancouver Dragons deferred their participation until the 2007–2008 season and the Utah Eagles folded on January 25, 2007. The CBA's 2007–08 season began with 10 franchises, the greatest number of teams to start a CBA season since the 2000–01 season. In addition to six returning franchises the CBA added three expansion teams – the Oklahoma Cavalry, the Rio Grande Valley Silverados and East Kentucky Miners; the Atlanta Krunk joined the league after sitting out the 2006–07 season.

The 2008–2009 season began with only four teams, instead of the expected five. The Pittsburgh Xplosion folded under unclear circumstances, and the league scheduled games against American Basketball Association (ABA) teams for the first month of the season in an attempt to stay solvent. The maneuver was not enough. On February 2, 2009, the league announced a halt to operations, turning a scheduled series between the Albany Patroons and Lawton-Fort Sill Cavalry into the league-championship series.

=== Integration ===
During the 1946–47 Eastern League season, the Hazleton Mountaineers had three African-American players on their roster during the season – Bill Brown, Zack Clayton and John Isaacs. Isaacs previously played with an all-black touring squad (the Washington Bears), while Brown and Clayton were alumni of the Harlem Globetrotters. During the 1955–56 season, the Hazleton Hawks Eastern League team was the first integrated professional league franchise with an all-black starting lineup: Tom Hemans, Jesse Arnelle, Fletcher Johnson, Sherman White and Floyd Lane. The all-black Dayton Rens competed in the 1948–49 National Basketball League.

== CBA–NBA relationship ==
During the early years of the CBA, when it was known as the EPBL, the league's relationship with the NBA was frosty at best. The NBA sent several players to the Eastern League for extra playing time, and for several seasons two Eastern League teams played the opening game of a New Year's Eve doubleheader at Madison Square Garden (with the NBA playing the nightcap game). Although the NBA played exhibition games with the Eastern League during the late 1940s and early 1950s, the exhibition games ceased in 1954 when the Eastern League signed several college basketball players involved in point-shaving gambling scandals during their college years, including Jack Molinas, Sherman White, Floyd Layne, and Al Roth. The Eastern League also signed 7-foot center Bill Spivey, the former University of Kentucky standout who was accused of point-shaving; although Spivey was acquitted of all charges, the NBA still banned him from the league for life.

After a few seasons, however, the NBA and EPBL resumed exhibition games in the 1950s (including a 1956 matchup in which the NBA's Syracuse Nationals lost to the EPBL's Wilkes-Barre Barons at Wilkes-Barre's home court). Other EPBL-NBA exhibition matchups include an October 1959 contest in which the New York Knicks defeated the Allentown Jets 131–102 at Allentown; and a contest in April 1961, in which the Boston Celtics also played an exhibition contest against Allentown (defeating the Eastern Leaguers soundly). The Eastern League became a haven for players who wanted to play professionally, but were barred from the NBA because of academic restrictions. Even though Ray Scott had left the University of Portland two months after his matriculation, the NBA could not sign Scott to a contract until Scott's class graduated. The EPBL, however, could sign him and Scott played 77 games for the Allentown Jets before later joining the NBA's Detroit Pistons.

By the 1967–68 season, the Eastern League lost many of its players when the upstart American Basketball Association formed. Players such as Lavern "Jelly" Tart, Willie Somerset, Art Heyman and Walt Simon (all of whom were all-stars in the Eastern League a year before) were now in ABA uniforms. The ABA continued to siphon off NBA and Eastern League players, leaving the Eastern League with only six teams in 1972 and four teams in 1975. Only the ABA-NBA merger in June 1976 kept the Eastern League alive, as an influx of players from defunct ABA teams joined the league.

In 1979, the NBA signed four players from the newly renamed CBA. The CBA, receiving no compensation from the NBA for these signings, sued the NBA. The suit was settled and in exchange for the right to sign any CBA player at any time, the NBA paid the CBA $115,000; it also paid the CBA $80,000 to develop NBA referees in the CBA. During this time, the NBA created the "10-day-contract", where an NBA team could sign a CBA player for 10 days, at the pro rata NBA minimum salary (as per the NBA's collective bargaining agreement). The NBA team could re-sign him to a second 10-day contract. After the second 10-day contract, the team had to either return the player to his CBA team or sign him for the balance of the NBA regular season. The CBA teams, in turn, received compensation for each 10-day contract.

By 1980, the CBA had become the official development league of the NBA. CBA teams had exclusive rights to players released by their NBA affiliated teams. NBA teams could sign players from any CBA team. By 1986, 54 former CBA players were playing in the NBA.

In 1987 the CBA announced that teams were allowed to sign players banned for drug use by the NBA. Mitchell Wiggins, who was suspended by the NBA for cocaine use, was one of the first players signed in the CBA under the new rule that was implemented in conjunction with the NBA and NBA Players Association.

During the 1993–94 season, the NBA–CBA affiliate relationship was replaced by an annual draft of NBA players. The draft gave CBA teams exclusive negotiating rights with NBA players in the event of their release from an NBA roster. The CBA team owned exclusive rights to the draftee in perpetuity.

During the 1980s and 1990s, the NBA's relationship with the CBA grew to the point where dozens of former CBA stars found their way onto NBA rosters, including Tim Legler (Omaha Racers), Mario Elie (Albany Patroons), and John Starks (Cedar Rapids Silver Bullets). The CBA also sent qualified coaches to the NBA, including Phil Jackson (Albany Patroons), Bill Musselman (Tampa Bay Thrillers), Eric Musselman (Rapid City Thrillers), Flip Saunders (LaCrosse Catbirds) and George Karl (Montana Golden Nuggets). In 2001, the NBA formed its own minor league, the National Basketball Development League (the NBDL or "D-League"). At the end of the 2005–2006 season, three current and one expansion CBA franchises jumped to the NBDL. During the 2006–07 season no players were called up from the CBA to the NBA, ending a streak of over 30 seasons of at least one call-up per year. That soon led to the beginning of the end for the CBA.

== NBA affiliation ==
The first affiliated team with NBA franchises was Baltimore Metros (Washington Bullets, Atlanta Hawks, Milwaukee Bucks) in the 1978–79 season, the first under the CBA name, and Billings Volcanoes became the second in 1981 (Chicago Bulls, Phoenix Suns, Utah Jazz). In the 1983–84 season there were 12 CBA teams affiliated with NBA franchises and it went on until the 1992-93 season with a record of 17 affiliations. After 1993 there was no CBA club affiliated to NBA which lasted until 2009.

== Rules and innovations ==
The CBA followed largely the same basketball rules as the NBA and most other professional leagues. Sometimes rules adopted by the CBA on an experimental basis later became permanent in that league and were adopted by other levels of basketball as well; others remained unique to the CBA. From 1978 through 1986, CBA commissioner Jim Drucker created several new rules to raise fan interest, which were then adopted by the league:

- Season standings were changed from a win–loss percentage, to the "7 Point System". During each game, seven points were awarded—three for winning the game, and one point for each quarter in which a team outscored their opponent. (If each team scored the same number of points in a quarter, the point for that quarter was halved.) Team standings were determined by the number of points, rather than win–loss percentage.
- A player could not foul out of the game; after a player's sixth personal foul, the opposing team receives an automatic free throw.
- During the 1982–83 and 1983–84 seasons, overtime games were decided by the team that scored the first three points in overtime. During the 1984–85 season, that rule was modified so that victory went to the first team to lead by three points in overtime. By the 1987–88 season, that rule was superseded by a standard five-minute overtime period to determine the winner.
- During the 1981–82 season, the CBA created a 6 by 5 feet (1.8 m × 1.5 m) "no call box"—an area in front of the baskets in which any contact in the box between offensive and defensive players was to be an automatic defensive foul. This rule, which was designed to encourage drives to the hoop, caused more confusion than scoring, and was quickly abandoned. A variation of this rule, using an arc rather than a box, was adopted by the NBA in 2002, and later also by the NCAA.
- For a few years in the early 1980s the CBA offered a money-back guarantee—returning a patron's money if, before the start of the second quarter, the fan left the game. There was also a "national season ticket", allowing fans to attend any CBA game within a 100-mile radius of their hometown.
- May 1984: At a league meeting in Louisville, Kentucky, three rules were changed; fouling a shooter on a three-point shot would result in three shots as opposed to two (later adopted by all levels of basketball), a win in overtime could only be determined when a team led by three points and a clear path foul was implemented.
- Drucker also created a series of high-profile, big-money promotions that attracted increased attendance, league sponsorship and media interest. From 1984 to 1986, "The 1 Million Dollar CBA Supershot" offered a $1,000,000 annuity prize for a fan selected at random at halftime who made a 3/4-court shot. Although no fan won that one, in 1986 one fan did win a $1 million zero-coupon bond. The winner, Don Mattingly, unrelated to the New York Yankee player with the same name, won the bond in the "CBA Easy Street Shootout" at the 1986 CBA All-Star Game in Tampa, Florida. Other promotions included the "Ton of Money Free Throw", which consisted of 2,000 pounds of pennies ($5,000) for making a foul shot, and "The Fly-In, Drive-Away" Contest where each fan received a paper airplane with a distinct serial number. At halftime a new car, with the sunroof opened, was driven to mid-court and the fan who threw his airplane into the sun roof won the car. A Ford Thunderbird was won by a fan at the CBA All-Star Game in Casper, Wyoming, in 1984.
- October 1985: A contest was held by the CBA to find a fan to be a color commentator on the "CBA Game of the Week" broadcast. The requirements for the contest was that the applicant had no prior broadcasting experience. The league set up a 24-hour phone number (212-828-8686) and a post office box where applicants could send their auditions.
- October 21, 1985: The CBA announced they would keep statistics on slam dunks. The CBA rosters were increased from nine spots to ten. A rule change was implemented calling for a jump ball at the beginning of every quarter. A ball similar to the red white and blue basketball popularized in the American Basketball Association was used for the 1985–86 season.
- June 1987: The CBA Board of Directors voted unanimously to extend the season to 54 games. The salary cap was adjusted to reflect the increased games. A five-minute overtime period was approved, scrapping the previous overtime rule that required a team to lead by three points to win.

== CBA draft ==
The CBA established a draft in 1985, following the NBA's decision to reduce its draft from 10 rounds to 7. This allowed the CBA teams to have a wider selection of players: the selection criteria were the same as the NBA draft. As with the NBA draft, players had to renounce their college eligibility if they wanted to declare early. While initially the draft was limited to players who were not drafted in the NBA, this later changed, and on several occasions players were drafted by both the NBA and the CBA. Some examples include Nick Van Exel (1993, Los Angeles Lakers of the NBA and Rapid City Thrillers of the CBA), Dontonio Wingfield (1994, Seattle SuperSonics and Rapid City Thrillers), Stephen Jackson (1997, Phoenix Suns and La Crosse Bobcats), and Jason Hart (2000, Milwaukee Bucks and Idaho Stampede).

CBA franchises usually selected players who had the higher chance to sign for them instead of signing overseas or in the NBA, even though some teams used their picks in the later rounds to select players who were likely to be drafted in the NBA, in the event these players were cut in the preseason. Some teams also used their picks for publicity: for example, Cheryl Miller, a female player who played for USC in college, was selected by the Rockford Lightning with the 57^{th} pick in the 1986 CBA draft; in the 1994 CBA draft Mexican soccer player Jorge Campos was drafted by the Mexico Aztecas, despite his ineligibility. In 1997, Lamar Odom, then a highly recruited high school prospect, was given the opportunity to enter the CBA draft and choose the team he wanted to play for, reversing the traditional drafting process; Odom, however, decided not to hire an agent and opted to play in college.

CBA draft first overall picks

Draft	Selected by	Player	Former team
1985	Kansas City Sizzlers	(United States) Regan Truesdale	The Citadel
1986	Jacksonville Jets	(United States) Jerry Stroman	Utah
1987	Quad City Thunder	(United States) Derrick Sanders	Illinois State
1988	Topeka Sizzlers	(United States) Lafester Rhodes	Iowa State
1989	San Jose Jammers	(United States) Mike Doktorczyk	UC Irvine
1990	Quad City Thunder	(United States) Ronald Draper	American
1991	Wichita Falls Texans	(United States) Robert Youngblood	Southern
1992	Grand Rapids Hoops	(United States) Rod Sellers	UConn
1993	Hartford Hellcats	(United States) Stacey Poole	Florida
1994	Yakima Sun Kings	(United States) Aaron Swinson	Auburn
1995	Omaha Racers	(United States) Fred Hoiberg	Iowa State
1996	Florida Beach Dogs	(United States) Carlos Strong	Georgia
1997	Rockford Lightning	(United States) Muntrelle Dobbins	Arkansas–Little Rock
1998	Grand Rapids Hoops	(United States) Saddi Washington	Western Michigan
1999	Quad City Thunder	(United States) Derek Hood	Arkansas
2000	Gary Steelheads	(United States) Ryan Blackwell	Syracuse
2002	Yakima Sun Kings	(United States) Elvin Mims	Southern Miss
2003	Sioux Falls Skyforce	(United States) Josh Powell	NC State
2004	Michigan Mayhem	(United States) Desmon Farmer	USC
2005	Albany Patroons	(United States) T. J. Thompson	George Washington
2006	Minot Skyrockets	(United States) Dayshawn Wright	Syracuse
2007	Oklahoma Cavalry	(United States) Caleb Green	Oral Roberts
2008	Albany Patroons	(United States) Michael Jenkins	Winthrop

== Salary cap ==
In the 1988–89 season every franchise had a salary cap of $80,000 for its entire roster.

It was reported that in 1993 that the salary cap was $130,000 for a 10-player active roster, while a top rookie could earn from $13,000 to $15,000. Seven years later, in 2000, the cap had increased to $220,000 for a 10-player roster, meaning that an average player would make roughly $22,000 a year.

== Team timelines ==
Italics denote a team that was re-located or re-branded. Bold denotes a team that played in the last full CBA season.

- Albany Patroons (1982–1992) → Capital Region Pontiacs (1992–93) → Hartford Hellcats (1993–94) → Connecticut Pride (1994–2000)
- **Albany Patroons** (2005–2009)
- Alberta Dusters (1980–1982) → Las Vegas Silvers (1982) → Albuquerque Silvers (1982–1985)
- Allentown Jets (1978–1979) → Lehigh Valley Jets (1979–1981)
- Anchorage Northern Knights (1978–1983)
- Atlanta Krunk (2007–2008)
- Baltimore Metros (1978–1979) → Mohawk Valley Thunderbirds (1979) → Utica Olympics (1979–1980) → Atlantic City Hi-Rollers (1980–1983)
- Butte Daredevils (2006–2008)
- Dakota Wizards (2001–2006)
- Detroit Spirits (1982–1986) → Savannah Spirits (1986–1988) → Tulsa Fast Breakers (1988–1991) → Tulsa Zone (1991–1992) → Fargo-Moorhead Fever (1992–1994) → Mexico City Aztecas (1994–1995) → San Diego Wildcards (1995)
- **East Kentucky Miners** (2007–2009)
- Evansville Thunder (1984–1986)
- Fargo-Moorhead Beez (2001–2002)
- Flint Fuze (2001–2002) → Great Lakes Storm (2002–2005)
- Fort Wayne Fury (1991–2001)
- Gary Steelheads (2000–2006)
- Grand Rapids Hoops (1989–1994) → Grand Rapids Mackers (1994–1996) → Grand Rapids Hoops (1996–2003)
- Great Falls Explorers (2006–2008)
- Hawaii Volcanos (1979–1980) → Billings Volcanos (1980–1984)
- Idaho Stampede (1997–2006)
- Indiana Alley Cats (2006–2007)
- Jersey Shore Bullets (1978–1979)
- Kansas City Sizzlers (1985–1986) → Topeka Sizzlers (1986–1990) → Yakima Sun Kings (1990–2008)
- Lancaster Red Roses (1978–1980) → Philadelphia Kings (1980–1981) → Lancaster Lightning (1981–1985) → Baltimore Lightning (1985–1986) → Rockford Lightning (1986–2006)
- Louisville Catbirds (1983–1985) → La Crosse Catbirds (1985–1994) → Pittsburgh Piranhas (1994–1995)
- Maine Lumberjacks (1978–1983) → Bay State Bombardiers (1983–1986) → Pensacola Tornados (1986–1991) → Birmingham Bandits (1991–1992) → Rochester Renegade (1992–1994) → Harrisburg Hammerheads (1994–1995)
- Michigan Mayhem (2004–2006)
- **Minot SkyRockets** (2006–2009)
- Montana Golden Nuggets (1980–1983) → Puerto Rico Coquis (1983–1985) → Maine Windjammers (1985–1986)
- Ohio Mixers (1982–1984) → Cincinnati Slammers (1984–1987) → Cedar Rapids Silver Bullets (1988–1991) → Tri-City Chinook (1991–1995)
- Oklahoma Cavalry (2007–2008) → **Lawton-Fort Sill Cavalry** (2008–2009)
- Oklahoma City Cavalry (1990–1997)
- Pittsburgh Xplosion (2006–2008)
- Quad City Thunder (1987–2001)
- Reno Bighorns (1982–1983)
- Rio Grande Valley Silverados (2007–2008)
- Rochester Zeniths (1978–1984)
- **Rockford Lightning** (2007–2009)
- San Jose Jammers (1989–1991) → Bakersfield Jammers (1991–1992)
- Santa Barbara Islanders (1989–1990)
- Sarasota Stingers (1983–1985) → Florida Stingers (1985–86) → Charleston Gunners (1986–1989) → Columbus Horizon (1989–1994) → Shreveport Crawdads (1994–1995) → Shreveport Storm (1995–1996)
- Sioux Falls Sky Force (1989–2000, 2001–2006)
- Saskatchewan Hawks (2001–2002)
- Tampa Bay Thrillers (1984–1986) → Rapid City Thrillers (1986–1995) → Florida Beachdogs (1995–1997)
- Toronto Tornados (1983–1985) → Pensacola Tornados (1985–1986) → Jacksonville Jets (1986) → Mississippi Jets (1986–1987) → Wichita Falls Texans (1988–1994) → Chicago Rockers (1994–1996) → La Crosse Bobcats (1996–2001)
- Utah Eagles (2006–2007)
- Wilkes-Barre Barons (1978–1979) → Pennsylvania Barons (1979–1980) → Scranton Aces (1980–1981)
- Wisconsin Flyers (1982–1987) → Rochester Flyers (1987–1989) → Omaha Racers (1989–1998)
- Wyoming Wildcatters (1982–1988)

== CBA All-Stars ==
In 1949, the league selected an All-Star team EPBL All Star Game against the Pottsville Packers . It continued for many years until 31 December 1988, facing the Rockford Lightning in the All-Star Game. A CBA All-Star team also played the Soviet Union on October 28, 1986, a team led by Vladimir Tkachenko and Sarunas Marculionis (Arvydas Sabonis did not play due to a heel injury). The CBA All-Stars lost 77-72 (Kenny Natt 16 pts, Billy Goodwin 12, Derrick Rowland 13 Lowes Moore 10 - Tkachenko 18, Marculionis 18).

The matches

- 1949: EPBL All-Stars - Pottsville Packers 74–69
- 1962: EPBL All-Stars - Allentown Jets 124–119
- 1963: EPBL All-Stars - Camden Bullets 122–114
- 1965: EPBL All-Stars - Camden Bullets 129–147
- 1970: All-Stars - Wilmington Blue Bombers 123–129
- 1971: EBA All-Stars - Scranton Apollos 123–146
- 1972: EBA All-Stars - Scranton Apollos 129–110
- 1976: EBA All-Stars - Allentown Jets 137–134
- 1977: EBA All-Stars - Allentown Jets 136–18
- 1979: West All-Stars - Rochester Zeniths 182–148
- 1983: CBA All-Stars - Allentown Jets 109–122
- 1984: CBA All-Stars - Wyoming Wildcatters 128–125
- 1985: CBA All-Stars - Evansville Thunder 113–109
- 1986: CBA All-Stars - Tampa Bay Thrillers 110–108
- 1986: CBA All-Stars - Soviet Union 72–77
- 1987: CBA All-Stars - La Crosse Catbirds 105–102
- 1988: CBA All-Stars - Topeka Sizzlers 115–94
- 1988: CBA All-Stars - Rockford Lightning 97–103

== International players ==
National team	Player	Period	Games	Notes
(United States) USA	Leon Wood	1983-84	16	Scored 47 pts.
(United States) USA	Charles Smith	1988	8	
(United States) USA	Jeff Grayer	1988	8	Scored 55 pts.
(United States) USA	Chris Smith	1990		World Cup 1990
(United States) USA	Mitchell Wiggins	1982	9	World Cup 1982
(United States) USA	Earl Jones	1982	9	World Cup 1982
(United States) USA	Jimmy King	1998	9	World Cup 1998
(United States) USA	Bill Edwards	1998	7	World Cup 1998
(United States) USA	Alex Scales	2005	9	
(United States) USA	Mark Randall	1989-90		World Cup 1990
(United States) USA	Henry Williams	1990	7	World Cup 1990
(United States) USA	Todd Day	1990	8	World Cup 1990
(United States) USA	John Pinone	1981-82	2	
(United States) USA	Keith Smart	1987	7	
(United States) USA	Thomas Hill	1991	6	
(United States) USA	Carl Thomas	1995-99	12	
(United States) USA	James Blackwell	1999	5	
(United States) USA	Mikki Moore	1999	5	
(United States) USA	Brian Davis	1995	7	
(United States) USA	Dave Jamerson	1995	6	
(United States) USA	Jim Thomas	1982	9	
(United States) USA	Travis Williams	1997-99	14	
(United States) USA	Byron Houston	1999	5	
(United States) USA	Michael Hawkins	1998-99	14	
(United States) USA	Jerome Beasley	2005	10	
(United States) USA	Noel Felix	2005	6	
Belize	Noel Felix	2009		
(United States) USA	Kermit Holmes	1997-99	14	
(United States) USA	James Martin	1999	4	
(United States) USA	Todd Lindeman	1999	5	
(United States) USA	Matt Steigenga	1999	4	
(United States) USA	Damon Bailey	1999	5	
(United States) USA	A.J. Wynder	1995	6	
(United States) USA	Kelsey Weems	1993-95		
(United States) USA	Erik Martin	1995-97	16	
(United States) USA	Doug Smith	1989-99	21	
(United States) USA	Larry Lewis	1995	6	
(United States) USA	Chuckie White	1995		Panamerican Games 1995

National team	Player	Period	Games	Notes
(United States) USA	Jason Sasser	1997-98	18	
(United States) USA	Mike Williams	1995	6	
(United States) USA	Elliot Perry	1989		AmeriCup 1989
(United States) USA	Rodney Monroe	1989		AmeriCup 1989
(United States) USA	Jimmy Oliver	1998	9	
(United States) USA	Ashraf Amaya	1998	9	
(United States) USA	Kiwane Garris	1998	9	
(United States) USA	Gerard King	1998	9	
(United States) USA	David Wood	1998	9	
(United States) USA	Brian Rahilly	1993		AmeriCup 1993
(United States) USA	Tony Martin	1993		AmeriCup 1993
(United States) USA	Tom Copa	1993	7	
(United States) USA	Ralph Sampson	1979	8	
(United States) USA	Michael Brooks	1979	9	
(United States) USA	Dick Miller	1979	0	Panamerican Games 1979
(United States) USA	Ray Tolbert	1979	8	
(United States) USA	Fennis Dembo	1987	7	
(United States) USA	Jim Farmer	1997	7	
(United States) USA	Russ Millard	1997	9	
(United States) USA	Rusty LaRue	1997	9	
(United States) USA	Michael McDonald	1997	9	
(United States) USA	Corey Beck	1994-97	9	
(United States) USA	Adrian Griffin	1997	6	
(United States) USA	Evers Burns	1997	9	
(United States) USA	Bobby Martin	1993		AmeriCup 1993
(United States) USA	Chris Corchiani	1989		AmeriCup 1989
(United States) USA	Greg Dennis	1989		AmeriCup 1989
(United States) USA	Craig Neal	1993		AmeriCup 1993
(United States) USA	Rod Mason	1993		AmeriCup 1993
(United States) USA	Harold Ellis	1993		AmeriCup 1993
(United States) USA	Chris Jent	1993		AmeriCup 1993
(United States) USA	Tony White	1993		AmeriCup 1993
(United States) USA	Eldridge Recasner	1993		AmeriCup 1993
(United States) USA	Reggie Jordan	1993-97		AmeriCup 1993

== Attendances ==
CBA era (1978–2009).

Season	Average
1978–79	885
1979–80	841
1980–81	917
1981–82	943
1982–83	1,255
1983–84	1,397
1984–85	1,141
1985–86	1,555
1986–87	2,296
1987–88	2,738
1988–89	3,170
1989–90	2,896
1990–91	3,260
1991–92	3,435
1992–93	3,369
1993–94	3,667
1994–95	3,767
1995–96	3,336
1996–97	3,707
1997–98	3,780
1998–99	3,809
1999–00	3,304
2000–01	2,786
2001–02	2,373
2002–03	2,577
2003–04	2,454
2004–05	2,409
2005–06	2,426
2006–07	
2007–08	
2008–09	

== Commissioners ==
The commissioners of the CBA were:

=== EPBL ===
- William Morgan (1946–55)
- Harry Rudolph (1955–70)

=== EBA ===
- William Montzman (1970–75)
- Steve A. Kauffman (1975–78)

=== CBA ===
- Jim Drucker (1978–86)
- Carl Scheer (1986–87)
- Mike Storen (1987–88)
- Jay Ramsdell (1988–89)
- Jerry Schemmel (1989–90)
- Irv Kaze (1990–91)
- Terdema Ussery (1991–93)
- Mark Lamping (1993–94)
- Tom Valdiserri (1994–96)
- Steve Patterson (1996–98)
- Gary Hunter (1998–99)
- Isiah Thomas (1999–00)
- Don Welsh (2000–01)
- Gary Hunter (2001–06)
- Jim Coyne (2007)
- Dennis Truax (2007–09)

== Hall of Famers ==
=== Basketball Hall of Fame ===
- (United States) Phil Jackson, Albany Patroons coach
- (United States) Isiah Thomas, CBA commissioner
- (United States) George Gervin, Quad City Thunder player
- George Karl , Montana Golden Nuggets and Albany Patroons coach

=== Collegiate Basketball Hall of Fame ===
- (United States) Cazzie Russell, Grand Rapids Hoops coach
- (United States) George Gervin, Quad City Thunder player
- (United States) Isiah Thomas, CBA commissioner

=== Australian Basketball Hall of Fame ===
- (United States) (Australia) Scott Fisher, Cincinnati Slammers player

== See also ==
- List of Continental Basketball Association seasons
- Continental Basketball Association statistical leaders
- List of Continental Basketball Association All-Star Games
- List of Continental Basketball Association award winners and successful alumni
- List of Continental Basketball Association champions
- List of developmental and minor sports leagues
