= Rubin Collins =

American basketball player (born 1953)

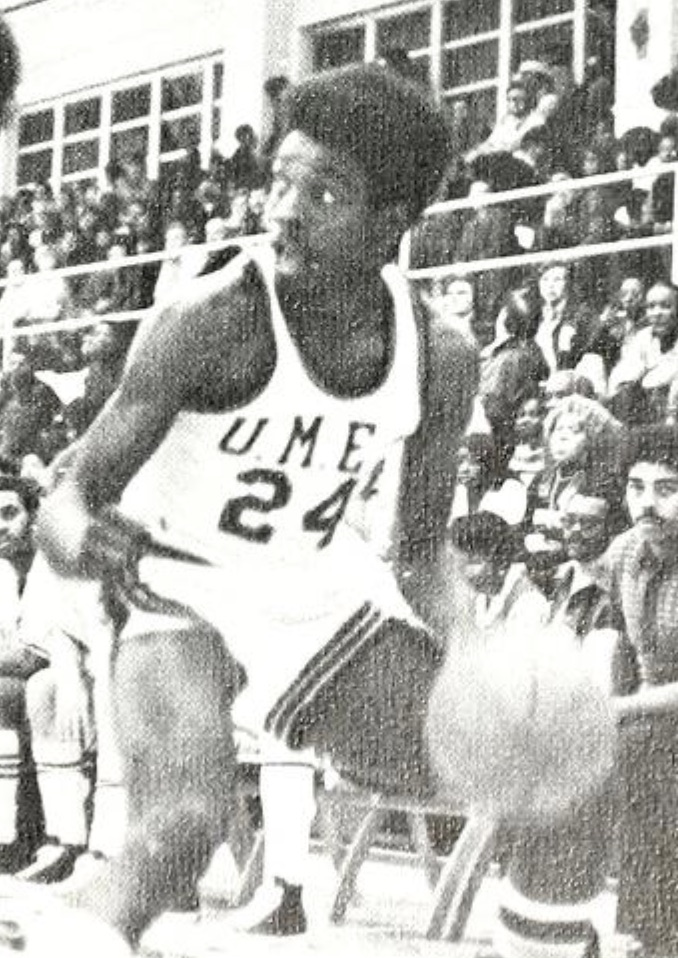
- Collins with the Maryland Eastern Shore Hawks during the 1973–74 season

Personal information
- Born: October 19, 1953 (age 73) Philadelphia, Pennsylvania, U.S.
- Listed height: 6 ft 3 in (1.91 m)
- Listed weight: 180 lb (82 kg)

Career information
- High school: Edison (Philadelphia, Pennsylvania); Washington (Princess Anne, Maryland)
- College: Maryland Eastern Shore (1971–1974)
- NBA draft: 1974: 2nd round, 36th overall pick
- Drafted by: Portland Trail Blazers
- Playing career: 1975–1978
- Position: Shooting guard

Career history
- 1975: Scranton Apollos
- 1976–1977: Lancaster Red Roses
- 1977–1978: Washington Metros / Baltimore Metros

Career highlights
- First-team All-NAIA (1974); Second-team NAIA All-American (1973); 2× First-team All-MEAC (1973, 1974)
- Stats at Basketball Reference

Rubin Collins Jr. (born October 19, 1953) is an American former professional basketball player. He played college basketball for the Maryland Eastern Shore Hawks. Collins was selected by the Philadelphia 76ers as the 36th overall pick of the 1974 NBA draft but spent his professional career in the Eastern Basketball Association (EBA).

== High school and college career ==
A native of Philadelphia, Pennsylvania, Collins attended Edison High School. He transferred to Washington High School in Princess Anne, Maryland, where he led the team to a 19–0 record during the 1970–71 regular season. Collins was offered scholarships by over 40 colleges.

Collins played college basketball for the Maryland Eastern Shore Hawks from 1971 to 1974. During his junior season in 1973–74, he led the Hawks in scoring when they won the MEAC men's basketball tournament and became the first men's basketball team from a historically black college to receive an invitation to the National Invitation Tournament (NIT). He was named to the first-teams of the All-MEAC and All-NAIA in 1974.

Collins was inducted into the Maryland Eastern Shore Athletics Hall of Fame twice: as a member of the 1973–74 NIT team in 2004 and individually in 2010.

== Professional career ==
At the conclusion of his junior season, Collins successfully applied for a hardship from the National Basketball Association (NBA) to be eligible in the 1974 NBA draft. He was selected by the Portland Trail Blazers as the 38th overall pick. Collins signed with the Trail Blazers on September 5, 1974, and attended rookie camp with the team. He was cut before the season began. In January 1975, Collins joined the Scranton Apollos of the Eastern Basketball Association (EBA) and appeared in one game. He played alongside his Hawks teammate, Billy Gordon, in the Urban Coalition League of Washington, D.C., in 1975.

Collins spent the 1975 preseason with his hometown Philadelphia 76ers but was told to seek another tryout elsewhere. He signed with the Washington Bullets before the 1976–77 season but was waived on September 30, 1976. Collins played for the Lancaster Red Roses of the EBA during the 1976–77 season. He played two further seasons in the EBA for the Washington Metros and Baltimore Metros from 1977 to 1978. On November 1, 1978, Collins was released by the Metros.
