= Cedric Hunter =

American basketball player (born 1965)

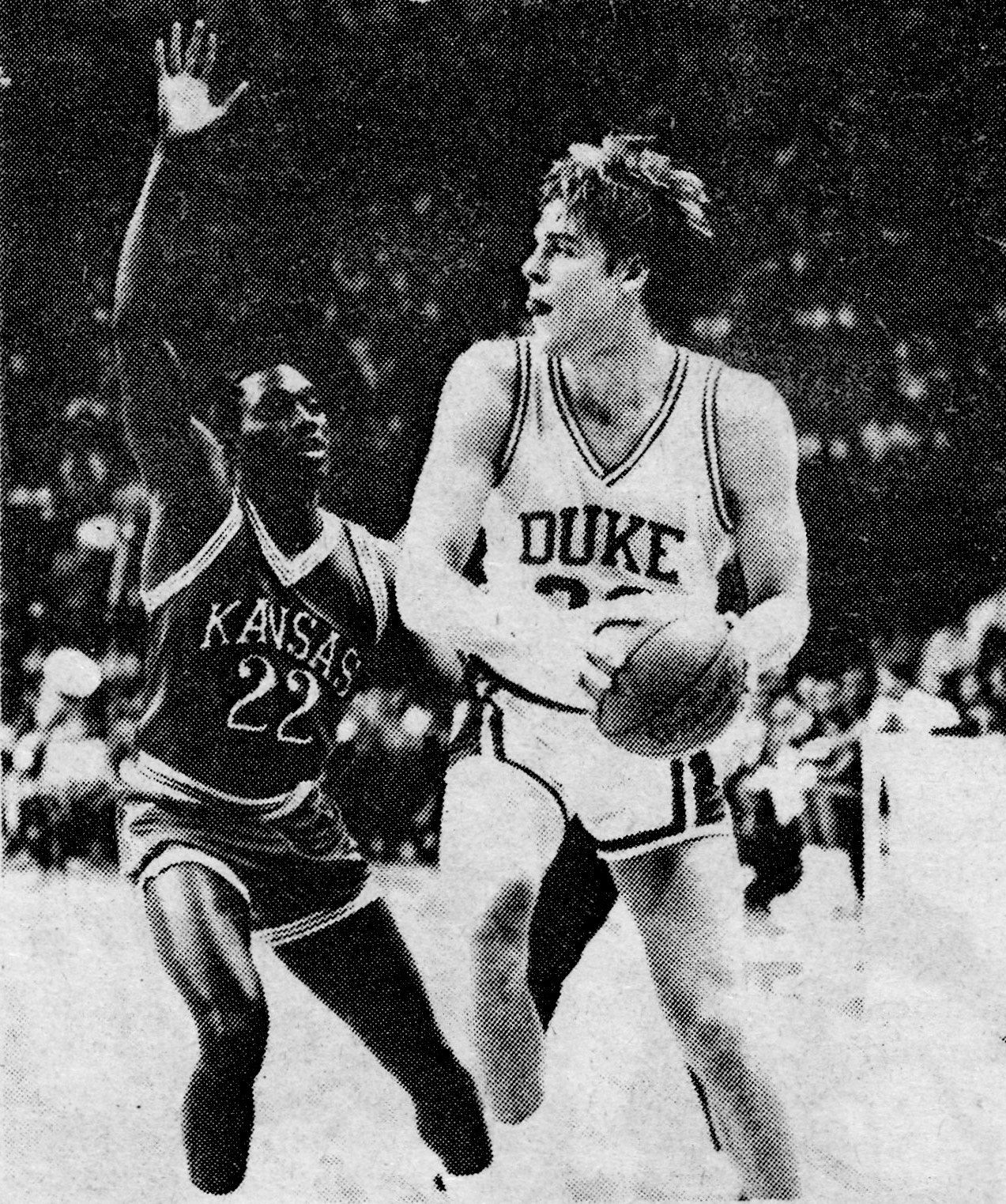
- Hunter (left) in the 1986 Final Four

Personal information
- Born: January 16, 1965 (age 60) Wichita Falls, Texas, U.S.
- Listed height: 6 ft 0 in (1.83 m)
- Listed weight: 180 lb (82 kg)

Career information
- High school: Omaha South (Omaha, Nebraska)
- College: Kansas (1983–1987)
- NBA draft: 1987: undrafted
- Playing career: 1987–1997
- Position: Point guard
- Number: 15

Career history
- 1987–1989: Topeka Sizzlers
- 1990–1992: Omaha Racers
- 1992: Charlotte Hornets
- 1992–1995: Sioux Falls Skyforce
- 1995–1996: Omaha Racers
- 1995–1996: San Diego Wildcards
- 1996–1997: Omaha Racers

Career highlights
- All-CBA Second Team (1990); CBA assists leader (1994)
- Stats at NBA.com
- Stats at Basketball Reference

Cedric R. Hunter (born January 16, 1965) is an American former professional basketball player. Born in Wichita Falls, TX, he was a 6-foot-0-inch (183 cm) 180 pounds (82 kg) point guard and played collegiately at the University of Kansas.

Hunter was signed as a free agent by the NBA's Charlotte Hornets to a 10-day contract on February 14, 1992, and played one minute of one game with them in 1991–92, registering no statistics.

Hunter played for the Topeka Sizzlers, Omaha Racers, and the Sioux Falls Skyforce in the Continental Basketball Association (CBA). He was selected to the All-CBA Second Team in 1990. Hunter is one of the CBA's All-Time leaders in games played and assists.

After his basketball career ended, Hunter continued to reside in Omaha with his family. As of 2022, he works as a behavioral counselor at Boys Town Day School.

Hunter is a member of the University of Kansas Basketball Hall of Fame as a player on the 1986 Final Four Team.
