= 2001 NBA playoffs =

Postseason tournament

Tournament details
- Dates: April 21–June 15, 2001
- Season: 2000–01
- Teams: 16

Final positions
- Champions: Los Angeles Lakers (13th title)
- Runners-up: Philadelphia 76ers
- Semifinalists: Milwaukee Bucks; San Antonio Spurs

Tournament statistics
- Scoring leader(s): Allen Iverson (76ers) (32.9 PPG)

Awards
- MVP: Shaquille O'Neal (Lakers)

The 2001 NBA playoffs was the postseason tournament of the National Basketball Association's 2000-01 season. The tournament concluded with the Western Conference champion Los Angeles Lakers defeating the Eastern Conference champion Philadelphia 76ers 4 games to 1. Shaquille O'Neal was named NBA Finals MVP for the second straight year.

== Overview ==
The Dallas Mavericks made the playoffs for the first time since 1990. Along the way they had many abysmal seasons, including back–to–back years with 11 and 13 wins between 1993 and 1994.

The Los Angeles Lakers entered the postseason with an eight-game winning streak, while the Milwaukee Bucks entered the playoffs as division champions for the first time since 1986.

For the first time since 1997, all four late 80's expansion teams (Miami, Orlando, Charlotte, and Minnesota) made the playoffs. As of 2024, this remains the most recent occurrence of all four expansion teams making the playoffs.

With their series win over the Orlando Magic, the Milwaukee Bucks won their first playoff series since 1989.

With their 3–2 series win over the Utah Jazz in the first round, the Dallas Mavericks won their first playoff series since 1988. This also marked the first time since 1995 that the Jazz failed to advance past the first round.

The Sacramento Kings won their first playoff series since 1981 (when they were the Kansas City Kings) and the first since moving to Sacramento. The Toronto Raptors also won their first playoff series in franchise history with their 3–2 first round victory over the New York Knicks. They did not win another playoff series until 2016.

For the first time since 1991, the Knicks failed to win a first–round playoff series. Coincidentally, this also marked the first time since 1996 that the Heat and the Knicks did not meet in the playoffs as both teams were eliminated in the first round by the Charlotte Hornets and the Toronto Raptors, respectively. The Heat and the Knicks did not return to the playoffs until 2004.

2001 also marked the closest the Charlotte Hornets came to making the Eastern Conference Finals, taking a 3–2 series lead over the Milwaukee Bucks before bowing out in seven games. As of 2024, the Hornets were one of two active teams (the other being the New Orleans Pelicans) to never advance to the Conference Finals. After eliminating the Hornets, the Milwaukee Bucks made the Eastern Conference Finals for the first time since 1986. For the Bucks, this was their most recent playoff series win until 2019.

The Western Conference Semi–Finals series between the San Antonio Spurs and Dallas Mavericks also marked the start of the Mavericks–Spurs rivalry. The Spurs would win this playoff series (along with subsequent series victories in 2003 and 2010), while the Mavericks won in 2006 and 2009. Game 4 of the series was the last NBA game ever played at Reunion Arena, as the Mavericks moved to the American Airlines Center the following season.

With their Western Conference Finals sweep of the San Antonio Spurs, the Lakers went 11–0 through the first three rounds, extending their winning streak to 19 games (regular season and playoffs)). The Lakers also equaled the previous records set by their 1989 team by winning their first 11 post–season games and sweeping three series in the post-season. Their playoff dominance would be bested after the first round of playoffs was extended to a best of seven format instead of the best of five in the 2003 NBA playoffs by the 2016–17 Golden State Warriors who would go 16–1 on their way to their fifth championship.

The Sixers win over the Bucks in the Eastern Conference Finals was shrouded in controversy. Milwaukee head coach George Karl and star guard Ray Allen were heavily fined by the NBA after publicly accusing the league of fixing the series to secure better TV ratings. The series featured wildly disproportionate foul counts and free-throw disparities. Philadelphia attempted 186 free throws to Milwaukee's 120 throughout the series, and the Bucks were assessed 12 technical fouls and 5 flagrant fouls compared to just 3 and 0 for the Sixers. In Game 7, Bucks starting center Scott Williams was assessed a retroactive flagrant foul from Game 6 and suspended for the decisive game, despite not being ejected during the original game.

Despite the controversy, the Philadelphia 76ers made the NBA Finals for the first time since 1983, when Moses Malone and Julius Erving led the 1983 team to the NBA title (coincidentally, last defeating the Lakers) in the famous "fo', fo', fo'" year (it ended up being "fo', fi', fo'", as Philadelphia lost one second-round game to the Milwaukee Bucks that year). With the loss, the Bucks did not return to the Conference Finals until 2019.

Game 1 of the 2001 NBA Finals was extremely notable for two things.

- Allen Iverson's step over Tyronn Lue
- The Philadelphia 76ers giving the Lakers their only loss of the postseason (107–101 in Overtime).

With their Game 5 win over the Philadelphia 76ers, the Los Angeles Lakers won their 13th NBA championship. With the win, the Lakers put together the most dominant postseason in NBA history, going 15–1. They set many records, including going undefeated in regulation and on the road (finishing 8–0 in the latter category). They were also the second NBA champion to defeat four 50–win or better teams on their way to the title as the Rockets did it first in 1995.

== Bracket ==
First Round | Conference Semifinals
E1 | Philadelphia* | 3
E8 | Indiana | 1
E1 | Philadelphia* | 4
E5 | Toronto | 3
E4 | New York | 2
E5 | Toronto | 3
Eastern Conference
E3 | Miami | 0
E6 | Charlotte | 3
E6 | Charlotte | 3
E2 | Milwaukee* | 4
E2 | Milwaukee* | 3
E7 | Orlando | 1
W1 | San Antonio* | 3
W8 | Minnesota | 1
W1 | San Antonio* | 4
W5 | Dallas | 1
W4 | Utah | 2
W5 | Dallas | 3
Western Conference
W3 | Sacramento | 3
W6 | Phoenix | 1
W3 | Sacramento | 0
W2 | LA Lakers* | 4
W2 | LA Lakers* | 3
W7 | Portland | 0

Conference Finals
E1 | Philadelphia* | 4
E2 | Milwaukee* | 3
W1 | San Antonio | 0
W2 | LA Lakers* | 4

NBA Finals
E1 | Philadelphia* | 1
W2 | LA Lakers* | 4

- * Division winner
- Bold Series winner
- Italic Team with home-court advantage

== Playoff qualifying ==
=== Western Conference ===
==== Best record in NBA ====
The San Antonio Spurs clinched the best record in the NBA, and they earned home-court advantage throughout the entire playoffs. However, when they lost to the Los Angeles Lakers in the Western Conference Finals, the Lakers gained home-court advantage for the NBA Finals. San Antonio's 58 games remain tied for the lowest for a team with home-court advantage throughout the playoffs, being equal to the 2023 Milwaukee Bucks.

==== Clinched a playoff berth ====
The following teams clinched a playoff berth in the West:

1. San Antonio Spurs – Midwest Division champions (58–24)
2. Los Angeles Lakers – Pacific Division champions, Western Conference regular season champions, NBA regular season champions (56–26)
3. Sacramento Kings (55–27)
4. Utah Jazz (53–29, 2–2 head-to-head vs. DAL, 14–10 record vs. Midwest Division, 35–17 record vs. Western Conference)
5. Dallas Mavericks (53–29, 2–2 head-to-head vs. UTA, 14–10 record vs. Midwest Division, 30–22 record vs. Western Conference)
6. Phoenix Suns (51–31)
7. Portland Trail Blazers (50–32)
8. Minnesota Timberwolves (47–35)

=== Eastern Conference ===
==== Best record in conference ====
The Philadelphia 76ers clinched the best record in the Eastern Conference and had home-court advantage throughout the Eastern Conference playoffs.

==== Clinched a playoff berth ====
The following teams clinched a playoff berth in the East:

1. Philadelphia 76ers – Atlantic Division champions, Eastern Conference regular season champions (56–26)
2. Milwaukee Bucks – Central Division champions (52–30)
3. Miami Heat (50–32)
4. New York Knicks (48–34)
5. Toronto Raptors (47–35)
6. Charlotte Hornets (46–36)
7. Orlando Magic (43–39)
8. Indiana Pacers (41–41)

== First round ==
Note: Times are EDT (UTC−4) as listed by the NBA.

=== Eastern Conference first round ===
==== (1) Philadelphia 76ers vs. (8) Indiana Pacers ====
NBC

April 21
12:30 PM

Boxscore

Indiana Pacers 79, Philadelphia 76ers 78
Scoring by quarter: 17–29, 19–23, 22–13, 21–13
| Pts: Miller, Rose 17 each Rebs: Jermaine O'Neal 20; Asts: Travis Best 10 | Pts: Aaron McKie 18; Rebs: Dikembe Mutombo 22; Asts: Iverson, McKie 7 each |
Indiana leads series, 1–0

First Union Center, Philadelphia, Pennsylvania
Attendance: 20,613
Referees: Dan Crawford, Joe Forte, Greg Willard

TBS

April 24
8:00 PM

Boxscore

Indiana Pacers 98, Philadelphia 76ers 116
Scoring by quarter: 27–28, 32–33, 19–30, 20–25
| Pts: Reggie Miller 41; Rebs: Jermaine O'Neal 11; Asts: Travis Best 6 | Pts: Allen Iverson 45; Rebs: Dikembe Mutombo 11; Asts: Allen Iverson 9 |
Series tied, 1–1

First Union Center, Philadelphia, Pennsylvania
Attendance: 20,739
Referees: Dick Bavetta, James Capers Jr., Terry Durham

NBC

April 28
1:40 PM

Boxscore

Philadelphia 76ers 92, Indiana Pacers 87
Scoring by quarter: 21–24, 24–17, 29–19, 18–27
| Pts: Allen Iverson 32; Rebs: Dikembe Mutombo 15; Asts: Allen Iverson 6 | Pts: Reggie Miller 35; Rebs: Travis Best 11; Asts: Travis Best 9 |
Philadelphia leads series, 2–1

Conseco Fieldhouse, Indianapolis, Indiana
Attendance: 18,345
Referees: Mike Callahan, Hugh Evans, Ron Olesiak

TBS

May 2
9:00 PM

Boxscore

Philadelphia 76ers 88, Indiana Pacers 85
Scoring by quarter: 25–27, 17–21, 22–21, 24–16
| Pts: Allen Iverson 33; Rebs: Dikembe Mutombo 11; Asts: Aaron McKie 6 | Pts: Reggie Miller 32; Rebs: Jermaine O'Neal 14; Asts: Travis Best 12 |
Philadelphia wins series, 3–1

Conseco Fieldhouse, Indianapolis, Indiana
Attendance: 18,345
Referees: Mike Mathis, Monty McCutchen, Bennett Salvatore

- In Game 1, Reggie Miller hit the game-winning 3 with 2.9 seconds left.

Regular-season series
Philadelphia won 3–0 in the regular-season series

January 28, 2001

Recap

Philadelphia 76ers 86, Indiana Pacers 81

Conseco Fieldhouse, Indianapolis

April 1, 2001

Recap

Indiana Pacers 93, Philadelphia 76ers 104

First Union Center, Philadelphia

April 17, 2001

Recap

Philadelphia 76ers 111, Indiana Pacers 105 (OT)

Conseco Fieldhouse, Indianapolis

This was the fourth playoff meeting between these two teams, with the Pacers winning two of the first three meetings.

Previous playoff series
Indiana leads 2–1 in all-time playoff series

1981

Indiana Pacers 0, Philadelphia 76ers 2

1981 Eastern Conference First Round

1999

Indiana Pacers 4, Philadelphia 76ers 0

1999 Eastern Conference Semifinals

2000

Indiana Pacers 4, Philadelphia 76ers 2

2000 Eastern Conference Semifinals

==== (2) Milwaukee Bucks vs. (7) Orlando Magic ====
TNT

April 22
8:30 PM

Boxscore

Orlando Magic 90, Milwaukee Bucks 103
Scoring by quarter: 22–21, 24–28, 28–30, 16–24
| Pts: Tracy McGrady 33; Rebs: McGrady, Outlaw 9 each Asts: Tracy McGrady 8 | Pts: Scott Williams 19; Rebs: Scott Williams 16; Asts: Sam Cassell 8 |
Milwaukee leads series, 1–0

Bradley Center, Milwaukee, Wisconsin
Attendance: 18,717
Referees: Ted Bernhardt, Mike Callahan, Ronnie Nunn

TNT

April 25
8:00 PM

Boxscore

Orlando Magic 96, Milwaukee Bucks 103
Scoring by quarter: 26–33, 25–20, 26–29, 19–21
| Pts: Tracy McGrady 35; Rebs: Doleac, Outlaw 7 each Asts: Tracy McGrady 7 | Pts: Ray Allen 27; Rebs: Ervin Johnson 13; Asts: Ray Allen 7 |
Milwaukee leads series, 2–0

Bradley Center, Milwaukee, Wisconsin
Attendance: 18,717
Referees: Sean Corbin, Bob Delaney, Hugh Evans

TNT

April 28
8:30 PM

Boxscore

Milwaukee Bucks 116, Orlando Magic 121 (OT)
Scoring by quarter: 23–24, 27–20, 24–36, 36–30, Overtime: 6–11
| Pts: Ray Allen 27; Rebs: Sam Cassell 16; Asts: Ray Allen 6 | Pts: Tracy McGrady 42; Rebs: Bo Outlaw 14; Asts: Tracy McGrady 10 |
Milwaukee leads series, 2–1

TD Waterhouse Centre, Orlando, Florida
Attendance: 17,248
Referees: Joe Forte, Bennett Salvatore, Mark Wunderlich

TBS

May 1
7:00 PM

Boxscore

Milwaukee Bucks 112, Orlando Magic 104
Scoring by quarter: 22–36, 35–25, 40–26, 15–17
| Pts: Ray Allen 26; Rebs: Tim Thomas 10; Asts: Sam Cassell 6 | Pts: Tracy McGrady 25; Rebs: Bo Outlaw 12; Asts: Armstrong, McGrady 8 each |
Milwaukee wins series, 3–1

TD Waterhouse Centre, Orlando, Florida
Attendance: 17,248
Referees: Jim Clark, Joe Crawford, Joe DeRosa

- In Game 3, Ray Allen sends the game to overtime with a dunk over Tracy McGrady with 3.5 seconds left.

Regular-season series
Milwaukee won 4–0 in the regular-season series

November 27, 2000

Recap

Milwaukee Bucks 104, Orlando Magic 95

TD Waterhouse Centre, Orlando, Florida

December 26, 2000

Recap

Orlando Magic 77, Milwaukee Bucks 89

Bradley Center, Milwaukee, Wisconsin

March 23, 2001

Recap

Orlando Magic 103, Milwaukee Bucks 115

Bradley Center, Milwaukee, Wisconsin

April 16, 2001

Recap

Milwaukee Bucks 101, Orlando Magic 89

TD Waterhouse Centre, Orlando, Florida

This was the first playoff meeting between the Bucks and the Magic.

==== (3) Miami Heat vs. (6) Charlotte Hornets ====
TNT

April 21
8:30 PM

Boxscore

Charlotte Hornets 106, Miami Heat 80
Scoring by quarter: 23–21, 27–19, 31–18, 25–22
| Pts: Jamal Mashburn 28; Rebs: P. J. Brown 7 Asts: Baron Davis 8 | Pts: Eddie House 16; Rebs: Brian Grant 10; Asts: Tim Hardaway 5 |
Charlotte leads series, 1–0

American Airlines Arena, Miami, Florida
Attendance: 20,085
Referees: Dick Bavetta, Scott Foster, Eddie F. Rush

TNT

April 23
7:00 PM

Boxscore

Charlotte Hornets 102, Miami Heat 76
Scoring by quarter: 26–26, 28–26, 24–7, 24–17
| Pts: Jamal Mashburn 22; Rebs: P. J. Brown 8 Asts: Baron Davis 4 | Pts: Eddie Jones 21; Rebs: Grant, Jones 6 each Asts: Tim Hardaway 4 |
Charlotte leads series, 2–0

American Airlines Arena, Miami, Florida
Attendance: 16,500
Referees: Ron Garretson, Jack Nies, Greg Willard

TNT

April 27
8:00 PM

Boxscore

Miami Heat 79, Charlotte Hornets 94
Scoring by quarter: 17–27, 14–31, 24–15, 24–21
| Pts: Eddie Jones 22; Rebs: Alonzo Mourning 9 Asts: Anthony Carter 5 | Pts: Davis, Mashburn 21 each Rebs: P. J. Brown 12; Asts: Jamal Mashburn 8 |
Charlotte wins series, 3–0

Charlotte Coliseum, Charlotte, North Carolina
Attendance: 22,283
Referees: Jim Clark, Joe Crawford, Bob Delaney

Regular-season series
Tied 2–2 in the regular-season series

November 3, 2000

Recap

Miami Heat 79, Charlotte Hornets 83

Charlotte Coliseum, Charlotte, North Carolina

November 14, 2000

Recap

Charlotte Hornets 86, Miami Heat 89 (OT)

American Airlines Arena, Miami

December 20, 2000

Recap

Miami Heat 56, Charlotte Hornets 65

Charlotte Coliseum, Charlotte, North Carolina

April 6, 2001

Recap

Charlotte Hornets 76, Miami Heat 81

American Airlines Arena, Miami

This was the first playoff meeting between the Heat and the Charlotte Hornets/Bobcats franchise.

==== (4) New York Knicks vs. (5) Toronto Raptors ====
NBC

April 22
12:30 PM

Boxscore

Toronto Raptors 85, New York Knicks 92
Scoring by quarter: 18–22, 26–19, 21–25, 20–26
| Pts: Davis, Williams 19 each Rebs: Antonio Davis 15; Asts: Alvin Williams 8 | Pts: Allan Houston 23; Rebs: Marcus Camby 18; Asts: Mark Jackson 6 |
New York leads series, 1–0

Madison Square Garden, New York City, New York
Attendance: 19,763
Referees: Tony Brothers, Joe DeRosa, Hugh Evans

TNT

April 26
8:00 PM

Boxscore

Toronto Raptors 94, New York Knicks 74
Scoring by quarter: 20–16, 19–19, 27–17, 28–22
| Pts: Alvin Williams 23; Rebs: Antonio Davis 12; Asts: Chris Childs 7 | Pts: Kurt Thomas 23; Rebs: Kurt Thomas 12; Asts: Mark Jackson 5 |
Series tied, 1–1

Madison Square Garden, New York City, New York
Attendance: 19,763
Referees: Dan Crawford, Terry Durham, Ron Olesiak

NBC

April 29
12:30 PM

Boxscore

New York Knicks 97, Toronto Raptors 89
Scoring by quarter: 20–16, 25–25, 23–26, 29–22
| Pts: Allan Houston 24; Rebs: Kurt Thomas 9 Asts: Latrell Sprewell 5 | Pts: Antonio Davis 21; Rebs: Antonio Davis 12; Asts: Chris Childs 9 |
New York leads series, 2–1

Air Canada Centre, Toronto, Ontario
Attendance: 20,217
Referees: Ted Bernhardt, Jim Clark, Bernie Fryer

TNT

May 2
8:00 PM

Boxscore

New York Knicks 93, Toronto Raptors 100
Scoring by quarter: 22–26, 19–18, 23–26, 29–30
| Pts: Allan Houston 27; Rebs: Kurt Thomas 10; Asts: Kurt Thomas 5 | Pts: Vince Carter 32; Rebs: Antonio Davis 9 Asts: Carter, Childs 4 each |
Series tied, 2–2

Air Canada Centre, Toronto, Ontario
Attendance: 20,282
Referees: Dick Bavetta, Mike Callahan, Don Vaden

TNT

May 4
8:00 PM

Boxscore

Toronto Raptors 93, New York Knicks 89
Scoring by quarter: 25–24, 24–19, 21–16, 23–30
| Pts: Vince Carter 27; Rebs: Antonio Davis 12; Asts: Chris Childs 9 | Pts: Latrell Sprewell 29; Rebs: Kurt Thomas 12; Asts: Mark Jackson 7 |
Toronto wins series, 3–2

Madison Square Garden, New York City, New York
Attendance: 19,763
Referees: Steve Javie, Eddie F. Rush, Bennett Salvatore

Regular-season series
Toronto won 3–1 in the regular-season series

November 25, 2000

Recap

Toronto Raptors 79, New York Knicks 75

Madison Square Garden, New York City

December 14, 2000

Recap

New York Knicks 68, Toronto Raptors 70

Air Canada Centre, Toronto

March 4, 2001

Recap

New York Knicks 88, Toronto Raptors 98

Air Canada Centre, Toronto

March 15, 2001

Recap

Toronto Raptors 72, New York Knicks 88

Madison Square Garden, New York City

This was the second playoff meeting between these two teams, with the Knicks winning the first meeting. This was the first-ever playoff series win for the Raptors.

Previous playoff series
New York leads 1–0 in all-time playoff series

2000

New York Knicks 3, Toronto Raptors 0

2000 Eastern Conference First Round

=== Western Conference first round ===
==== (1) San Antonio Spurs vs. (8) Minnesota Timberwolves ====
NBC

April 21
5:30 PM

Boxscore

Minnesota Timberwolves 82, San Antonio Spurs 87
Scoring by quarter: 24–25, 13–26, 28–12, 17–24
| Pts: Kevin Garnett 25; Rebs: Kevin Garnett 13; Asts: Terrell Brandon 8 | Pts: Tim Duncan 33; Rebs: Tim Duncan 15; Asts: Duncan, Ferry 4 each |
San Antonio leads series, 1–0

Alamodome, San Antonio, Texas
Attendance: 33,983
Referees: Ron Garretson, Jack Nies, Mark Wunderlich

TNT

April 23
9:30 PM

Boxscore

Minnesota Timberwolves 69, San Antonio Spurs 86
Scoring by quarter: 16–20, 20–30, 15–24, 18–12
| Pts: Kevin Garnett 18; Rebs: Kevin Garnett 12; Asts: six players 2 each | Pts: Tim Duncan 18; Rebs: Duncan, Robinson 11 each Asts: Duncan, Porter 4 each |
San Antonio leads series, 2–0

Alamodome, San Antonio, Texas
Attendance: 31,759
Referees: Joe Crawford, Luis Grillo, Hue Hollins

NBC

April 28
5:30 PM

Boxscore

San Antonio Spurs 84, Minnesota Timberwolves 93
Scoring by quarter: 19–24, 23–23, 24–21, 18–25
| Pts: David Robinson 22; Rebs: David Robinson 17; Asts: Derek Anderson 4 | Pts: Kevin Garnett 22; Rebs: Kevin Garnett 8 Asts: Terrell Brandon 9 |
San Antonio leads series, 2–1

Target Center, Minneapolis, Minnesota
Attendance: 17,676
Referees: Dick Bavetta, Joe DeRosa, Tim Donaghy

TNT

April 30
8:00 PM

Boxscore

San Antonio Spurs 97, Minnesota Timberwolves 84
Scoring by quarter: 19–19, 25–24, 27–20, 26–21
| Pts: Tim Duncan 24; Rebs: Tim Duncan 16; Asts: Derek Anderson 6 | Pts: Wally Szczerbiak 20; Rebs: Kevin Garnett 15; Asts: Terrell Brandon 6 |
San Antonio wins series, 3–1

Target Center, Minneapolis, Minnesota
Attendance: 16,336
Referees: Dan Crawford, Bob Delaney, Bill Spooner

Regular-season series
San Antonio won 3–1 in the regular-season series

November 2, 2000

Recap

Minnesota Timberwolves 91, San Antonio Spurs 103

Alamodome, San Antonio

November 17, 2000

Recap

San Antonio Spurs 94, Minnesota Timberwolves 99 (OT)

Target Center, Minneapolis

February 16, 2001

Recap

San Antonio Spurs 91, Minnesota Timberwolves 85

Target Center, Minneapolis

March 14, 2001

Recap

Minnesota Timberwolves 100, San Antonio Spurs 106 (OT)

Alamodome, San Antonio

This was the second playoff meeting between these two teams, with the Spurs winning the first meeting.

Previous playoff series
San Antonio leads 1–0 in all-time playoff series

1999

Minnesota Timberwolves 1, San Antonio Spurs 3

1999 Western Conference First Round

- This is the most recent playoff series between the Spurs & Timberwolves until 2026.

==== (2) Los Angeles Lakers vs. (7) Portland Trail Blazers ====
NBC

April 22
5:30 PM

Boxscore

Portland Trail Blazers 93, Los Angeles Lakers 106
Scoring by quarter: 19–30, 29–21, 24–23, 21–32
| Pts: Rasheed Wallace 24; Rebs: Arvydas Sabonis 9 Asts: three players 4 each | Pts: Kobe Bryant 28; Rebs: Shaquille O'Neal 20; Asts: Kobe Bryant 7 |
LA Lakers lead series, 1–0

Staples Center, Los Angeles, California
Attendance: 18,997
Referees: Bernie Fryer, Bill Spooner, Don Vaden

TNT

April 26
10:30 PM

Boxscore

Portland Trail Blazers 88, Los Angeles Lakers 106
Scoring by quarter: 29–25, 17–30, 19–25, 23–26
| Pts: Scottie Pippen 21; Rebs: Scottie Pippen 8 Asts: Damon Stoudamire 5 | Pts: Shaquille O'Neal 32; Rebs: Shaquille O'Neal 12; Asts: Kobe Bryant 7 |
LA Lakers lead series, 2–0

Staples Center, Los Angeles, California
Attendance: 18,997
Referees: Steve Javie, Ronnie Nunn, Derrick Stafford

NBC

April 29
5:30 PM

Boxscore

Los Angeles Lakers 99, Portland Trail Blazers 86
Scoring by quarter: 23–26, 31–21, 25–25, 20–14
| Pts: Shaquille O'Neal 25; Rebs: Shaquille O'Neal 15; Asts: Kobe Bryant 9 | Pts: Smith, Stoudamire 25 each Rebs: Rasheed Wallace 13; Asts: Stoudamire, Wallace 4 each |
LA Lakers win series, 3–0

Rose Garden, Portland, Oregon
Attendance: 20,580
Referees: Ron Garretson, Jack Nies, Greg Willard

Regular-season series
Tied 2–2 in the regular-season series

October 31, 2000

Recap

Los Angeles Lakers 96, Portland Trail Blazers 86

Rose Garden Arena, Portland, Oregon

December 13, 2000

Recap

Los Angeles Lakers 86, Portland Trail Blazers 96

Rose Garden Arena, Portland, Oregon

December 25, 2000

Recap

Portland Trail Blazers 109, Los Angeles Lakers 104

Staples Center, Los Angeles

April 15, 2001

Recap

Portland Trail Blazers 100, Los Angeles Lakers 105

Staples Center, Los Angeles

This was the tenth playoff meeting between these two teams, with the Lakers winning seven of the first nine meetings.

Previous playoff series
Los Angeles leads 7–2 in all-time playoff series

1977

Los Angeles Lakers 0, Portland Trail Blazers 4

1977 Western Conference Finals

1983

Los Angeles Lakers 4, Portland Trail Blazers 1

1983 Western Conference Semifinals

1985

Los Angeles Lakers 4, Portland Trail Blazers 1

1985 Western Conference Semifinals

1989

Los Angeles Lakers 3, Portland Trail Blazers 0

1989 Western Conference First Round

1991

Los Angeles Lakers 4, Portland Trail Blazers 2

1991 Western Conference Finals

1992

Los Angeles Lakers 1, Portland Trail Blazers 3

1992 Western Conference First Round

1997

Los Angeles Lakers 3, Portland Trail Blazers 1

1997 Western Conference First Round

1998

Los Angeles Lakers 3, Portland Trail Blazers 1

1998 Western Conference First Round

2000

Los Angeles Lakers 4, Portland Trail Blazers 3

2000 Western Conference Finals

==== (3) Sacramento Kings vs. (6) Phoenix Suns ====
NBC

April 22
3:00 PM

Boxscore

Phoenix Suns 86, Sacramento Kings 83
Scoring by quarter: 28–25, 10–19, 28–22, 20–17
| Pts: Shawn Marion 21; Rebs: Jake Tsakalidis 11; Asts: Jason Kidd 14 | Pts: Chris Webber 27; Rebs: Chris Webber 15; Asts: Christie, Williams 5 each |
Phoenix leads series, 1–0

ARCO Arena, Sacramento, California
Attendance: 17,317
Referees: Mike Mathis, Monty McCutchen, Bennett Salvatore

TNT

April 25
10:30 PM

Boxscore

Phoenix Suns 90, Sacramento Kings 116
Scoring by quarter: 22–31, 21–32, 20–32, 27–21
| Pts: Tony Delk 14; Rebs: Tom Gugliotta 8 Asts: Jason Kidd 9 | Pts: Peja Stojaković 22; Rebs: Jackson, Webber 9 each Asts: Chris Webber 5 |
Series tied, 1–1

ARCO Arena, Sacramento, California
Attendance: 17,317
Referees: Ted Bernhardt, Bernie Fryer, Don Vaden

NBC

April 29
3:00 PM

Boxscore

Sacramento Kings 104, Phoenix Suns 96
Scoring by quarter: 19–36, 34–19, 22–18, 29–23
| Pts: Chris Webber 23; Rebs: Vlade Divac 12; Asts: Doug Christie 4 | Pts: Jason Kidd 19; Rebs: Shawn Marion 10; Asts: Jason Kidd 16 |
Sacramento leads series, 2–1

America West Arena, Phoenix, Arizona
Attendance: 19,023
Referees: Steve Javie, Ronnie Nunn, Derrick Stafford

TNT

May 2
10:30 PM

Boxscore

Sacramento Kings 89, Phoenix Suns 82
Scoring by quarter: 14–29, 22–18, 23–16, 30–19
| Pts: Peja Stojaković 37; Rebs: Scot Pollard 13; Asts: Bobby Jackson 5 | Pts: Clifford Robinson 24; Rebs: Jake Tsakalidis 12; Asts: Jason Kidd 14 |
Sacramento wins series, 3–1

America West Arena, Phoenix, Arizona
Attendance: 18,836
Referees: Scott Foster, Hue Hollins, Jack Nies

Regular-season series
Sacramento won 3–1 in the regular-season series

December 1, 2000

Recap

Phoenix Suns 98, Sacramento Kings 105

ARCO Arena, Sacramento, California

January 2, 2001

Recap

Phoenix Suns 117, Sacramento Kings 121 (OT)

ARCO Arena, Sacramento, California

March 7, 2001

Recap

Sacramento Kings 100, Phoenix Suns 89

America West Arena, Phoenix, Arizona

April 15, 2001

Recap

Sacramento Kings 86, Phoenix Suns 88

America West Arena, Phoenix, Arizona

This was the fourth playoff meeting between these two teams, with the Suns winning two of the first three meetings.

Previous playoff series
Phoenix leads 2–1 in all-time playoff series

1979

Phoenix Suns 4, Kansas City Kings 2

1979 Western Conference Semifinals

1980

Phoenix Suns 2, Kansas City Kings 1

1980 Western Conference First Round

1981

Phoenix Suns 3, Kansas City Kings 4

1981 Western Conference Semifinals

==== (4) Utah Jazz vs. (5) Dallas Mavericks ====
NBC

April 21
3:00 PM

Boxscore

Dallas Mavericks 86, Utah Jazz 88
Scoring by quarter: 17–22, 22–18, 23–21, 24–27
| Pts: Michael Finley 26; Rebs: Dirk Nowitzki 12; Asts: Steve Nash 7 | Pts: Karl Malone 26; Rebs: Bryon Russell 12; Asts: John Stockton 18 |
Utah leads series, 1–0

Delta Center, Salt Lake City, Utah
Attendance: 19,100
Referees: Joe Crawford, Luis Grillo, Hue Hollins

TBS

April 24
10:30 PM

Boxscore

Dallas Mavericks 98, Utah Jazz 109
Scoring by quarter: 19–28, 22–25, 27–31, 30–25
| Pts: Michael Finley 32; Rebs: Bradley, Finley 8 each Asts: Steve Nash 6 | Pts: Karl Malone 34; Rebs: Bryon Russell 8 Asts: John Stockton 9 |
Utah leads series, 2–0

Delta Center, Salt Lake City, Utah
Attendance: 19,911
Referees: Mike Mathis, Monty McCutchen, Bennett Salvatore

NBC

April 28
3:00 PM

Boxscore

Utah Jazz 91, Dallas Mavericks 94
Scoring by quarter: 22–31, 21–20, 22–21, 26–22
| Pts: Karl Malone 29; Rebs: Karl Malone 13; Asts: John Stockton 10 | Pts: Dirk Nowitzki 33; Rebs: Juwan Howard 11; Asts: Steve Nash 7 |
Utah leads series, 2–1

Reunion Arena, Dallas, Texas
Attendance: 18,187
Referees: Dan Crawford, Scott Foster, Eddie F. Rush

TBS

May 1
9:30 PM

Boxscore

Utah Jazz 77, Dallas Mavericks 107
Scoring by quarter: 24–17, 18–28, 21–36, 14–26
| Pts: Karl Malone 25; Rebs: Donyell Marshall 9 Asts: John Stockton 9 | Pts: Dirk Nowitzki 33; Rebs: Michael Finley 12; Asts: Steve Nash 7 |
Series tied, 2–2

Reunion Arena, Dallas, Texas
Attendance: 18,300
Referees: Bernie Fryer, Steve Javie, Mark Wunderlich

TNT

May 3
9:00 PM

Boxscore

Dallas Mavericks 84, Utah Jazz 83
Scoring by quarter: 16–20, 17–28, 24–23, 27–12
| Pts: Michael Finley 33; Rebs: Juwan Howard 8 Asts: Steve Nash 7 | Pts: Karl Malone 24; Rebs: Karl Malone 10; Asts: John Stockton 11 |
Dallas wins series, 3–2

Delta Center, Salt Lake City, Utah
Attendance: 19,911
Referees: Bob Delaney, Hugh Evans, Joe Forte

- In Game 5, Calvin Booth made the series winning layup with 9.6 seconds left. The Mavs would then not only become the 8th team in playoff history to overcome an 0–2 deficit, but also win their first playoff series since 1988.

Regular-season series
Tied 2–2 in the regular-season series

November 4, 2000

Recap

Utah Jazz 112, Dallas Mavericks 106

Reunion Arena, Dallas

November 20, 2000

Recap

Dallas Mavericks 107, Utah Jazz 98

Delta Center, Salt Lake City

March 26, 2001

Recap

Dallas Mavericks 98, Utah Jazz 90

Delta Center, Salt Lake City

April 7, 2001

Recap

Utah Jazz 116, Dallas Mavericks 103

Reunion Arena, Dallas

This was the second playoff meeting between these two teams, with the Mavericks winning the first meeting.

Previous playoff series
Dallas leads 1–0 in all-time playoff series

1986

Dallas Mavericks 3, Utah Jazz 1

1986 Western Conference First Round

- This is the most recent playoff series between the Jazz & Mavericks until 2022.

== Conference semifinals ==
=== Eastern Conference semifinals ===
==== (1) Philadelphia 76ers vs. (5) Toronto Raptors ====
NBC

May 6
5:30 PM

Boxscore

Toronto Raptors 96, Philadelphia 76ers 93
Scoring by quarter: 21–17, 26–20, 26–24, 23–32
| Pts: Vince Carter 35; Rebs: Antonio Davis 12; Asts: Vince Carter 7 | Pts: Allen Iverson 36; Rebs: Dikembe Mutombo 12; Asts: Eric Snow 7 |
Toronto leads series, 1–0

First Union Center, Philadelphia, Pennsylvania
Attendance: 20,892
Referees: Bernie Fryer, Luis Grillo, Jack Nies

TNT

May 9
7:00 PM

Boxscore

Toronto Raptors 92, Philadelphia 76ers 97
Scoring by quarter: 31–21, 16–28, 24–24, 21–24
| Pts: Vince Carter 28; Rebs: Antonio Davis 10; Asts: Chris Childs 9 | Pts: Allen Iverson 54; Rebs: Tyrone Hill 10; Asts: Eric Snow 5 |
Series tied, 1–1

First Union Center, Philadelphia, Pennsylvania
Attendance: 20,870
Referees: Joe Crawford, Derrick Stafford, Don Vaden

TNT

May 11
8:00 PM

Boxscore

Philadelphia 76ers 78, Toronto Raptors 102
Scoring by quarter: 23–23, 18–35, 20–17, 17–27
| Pts: Allen Iverson 23; Rebs: Dikembe Mutombo 9 Asts: Allen Iverson 8 | Pts: Vince Carter 50; Rebs: Antonio Davis 14; Asts: Chris Childs 10 |
Toronto leads series, 2–1

Air Canada Centre, Toronto, Ontario
Attendance: 20,436
Referees: Dan Crawford, Joe Forte, Hue Hollins

NBC

May 13
3:00 PM

Boxscore

Philadelphia 76ers 84, Toronto Raptors 79
Scoring by quarter: 26–18, 23–18, 21–25, 14–18
| Pts: Allen Iverson 30; Rebs: Dikembe Mutombo 17; Asts: Iverson, McKie 5 each | Pts: Vince Carter 25; Rebs: Davis, Oakley 11 each Asts: Chris Childs 7 |
Series tied, 2–2

Air Canada Centre, Toronto, Ontario
Attendance: 20,351
Referees: Ron Garretson, Steve Javie, Greg Willard

TNT

May 16
8:00 PM

Boxscore

Toronto Raptors 88, Philadelphia 76ers 121
Scoring by quarter: 12–33, 28–29, 27–31, 21–28
| Pts: Vince Carter 16; Rebs: three players 5 each Asts: Chris Childs 8 | Pts: Allen Iverson 52; Rebs: Dikembe Mutombo 9 Asts: Aaron McKie 9 |
Philadelphia leads series, 3–2

First Union Center, Philadelphia, Pennsylvania
Attendance: 20,939
Referees: Ted Bernhardt, Bob Delaney, Bennett Salvatore

TNT

May 18
8:00 PM

Boxscore

Philadelphia 76ers 89, Toronto Raptors 101
Scoring by quarter: 17–27, 22–27, 29–16, 21–31
| Pts: Allen Iverson 20; Rebs: Dikembe Mutombo 14; Asts: Aaron McKie 6 | Pts: Vince Carter 39; Rebs: Antonio Davis 13; Asts: Morris Peterson 7 |
Series tied, 3–3

Air Canada Centre, Toronto, Ontario
Attendance: 20,499
Referees: Hugh Evans, Bernie Fryer, Ronnie Nunn

NBC

May 20
5:30 PM

Boxscore

Toronto Raptors 87, Philadelphia 76ers 88
Scoring by quarter: 21–31, 21–19, 24–19, 21–19
| Pts: Antonio Davis 23; Rebs: Charles Oakley 10; Asts: Vince Carter 9 | Pts: Aaron McKie 22; Rebs: Dikembe Mutombo 17; Asts: Allen Iverson 16 |
Philadelphia wins series, 4–3

First Union Center, Philadelphia, Pennsylvania
Attendance: 20,848
Referees: Dick Bavetta, Dan Crawford, Eddie F. Rush

- 76ers ended a 16-year drought by advancing to the conference finals when Vince Carter's long jumper at the buzzer bounced off the rim.

Regular-season series
Toronto won 3–1 in the regular-season series

November 1, 2000

Recap

Toronto Raptors 98, Philadelphia 76ers 104

First Union Center, Philadelphia

January 21, 2001

Recap

Toronto Raptors 110, Philadelphia 76ers 106 (OT)

First Union Center, Philadelphia

January 30, 2001

Recap

Philadelphia 76ers 89, Toronto Raptors 96

Air Canada Centre, Toronto, Ontario

April 3, 2001

Recap

Philadelphia 76ers 85, Toronto Raptors 100

Air Canada Centre, Toronto, Ontario

This was the first playoff meeting between the 76ers and the Raptors.

==== (2) Milwaukee Bucks vs. (6) Charlotte Hornets ====
NBC

May 6
12:40 PM

Boxscore

Charlotte Hornets 92, Milwaukee Bucks 104
Scoring by quarter: 24–27, 16–28, 33–23, 19–26
| Pts: Jamal Mashburn 23; Rebs: Elden Campbell 13; Asts: Baron Davis 7 | Pts: Ray Allen 26; Rebs: Ervin Johnson 12; Asts: Glenn Robinson 11 |
Milwaukee leads series, 1–0

Bradley Center, Milwaukee, Wisconsin
Attendance: 18,717
Referees: Hugh Evans, Ronnie Nunn, Mark Wunderlich

TBS

May 8
8:00 PM

Boxscore

Charlotte Hornets 90, Milwaukee Bucks 91
Scoring by quarter: 19–27, 17–20, 26–21, 28–23
| Pts: David Wesley 20; Rebs: P. J. Brown 11; Asts: David Wesley 7 | Pts: Ray Allen 28; Rebs: Ervin Johnson 12; Asts: Ray Allen 9 |
Milwaukee leads series, 2–0

Bradley Center, Milwaukee, Wisconsin
Attendance: 18,717
Referees: Dan Crawford, Bernie Fryer, Mike Mathis

TNT

May 10
8:00 PM

Boxscore

Milwaukee Bucks 92, Charlotte Hornets 102
Scoring by quarter: 26–25, 25–26, 18–25, 23–26
| Pts: Glenn Robinson 23; Rebs: Scott Williams 10; Asts: Sam Cassell 9 | Pts: Jamal Mashburn 36; Rebs: P. J. Brown 16; Asts: three players 6 each |
Milwaukee leads series, 2–1

Charlotte Coliseum, Charlotte, North Carolina
Attendance: 17,392
Referees: Mike Callahan, Steve Javie, Eddie F. Rush

NBC

May 13
12:30 PM

Boxscore

Milwaukee Bucks 78, Charlotte Hornets 85
Scoring by quarter: 18–28, 27–22, 21–20, 12–15
| Pts: Ray Allen 19; Rebs: Glenn Robinson 12; Asts: Ray Allen 10 | Pts: Jamal Mashburn 31; Rebs: P. J. Brown 13; Asts: Baron Davis 7 |
Series tied, 2–2

Charlotte Coliseum, Charlotte, North Carolina
Attendance: 18,756
Referees: Joe Crawford, Bob Delaney, Hue Hollins

TBS

May 15
8:30 PM

Boxscore

Charlotte Hornets 94, Milwaukee Bucks 86
Scoring by quarter: 26–26, 26–23, 28–20, 14–17
| Pts: Jamal Mashburn 24; Rebs: Elden Campbell 10; Asts: Jamal Mashburn 8 | Pts: Glenn Robinson 22; Rebs: Ervin Johnson 17; Asts: Ray Allen 7 |
Charlotte leads series, 3–2

Bradley Center, Milwaukee, Wisconsin
Attendance: 18,717
Referees: Dick Bavetta, Ron Garretson, Greg Willard

TNT

May 17
8:00 PM

Boxscore

Milwaukee Bucks 104, Charlotte Hornets 97
Scoring by quarter: 21–28, 22–25, 28–18, 33–26
| Pts: Sam Cassell 33; Rebs: Ervin Johnson 13; Asts: Sam Cassell 11 | Pts: David Wesley 27; Rebs: Jamal Mashburn 9 Asts: Jamal Mashburn 7 |
Series tied, 3–3

Charlotte Coliseum, Charlotte, North Carolina
Attendance: 23,509
Referees: Joe DeRosa, Jack Nies, Derrick Stafford

NBC

May 20
3:00 PM

Boxscore

Charlotte Hornets 95, Milwaukee Bucks 104
Scoring by quarter: 26–23, 21–21, 17–29, 31–31
| Pts: Baron Davis 29; Rebs: Elden Campbell 10; Asts: Jamal Mashburn 9 | Pts: Glenn Robinson 29; Rebs: Ervin Johnson 11; Asts: Sam Cassell 13 |
Milwaukee wins series, 4–3

Bradley Center, Milwaukee, Wisconsin
Attendance: 18,717
Referees: Steve Javie, Bennett Salvatore, Don Vaden

Regular-season series
Charlotte won 3–1 in the regular-season series

November 24, 2000

Recap

Charlotte Hornets 106, Milwaukee Bucks 90

Bradley Center, Milwaukee, Wisconsin

January 19, 2001

Recap

Milwaukee Bucks 105, Charlotte Hornets 98

Charlotte Coliseum, Charlotte, North Carolina

February 17, 2001

Recap

Charlotte Hornets 103, Milwaukee Bucks 93

Bradley Center, Milwaukee, Wisconsin

March 10, 2001

Recap

Milwaukee Bucks 90, Charlotte Hornets 100

Charlotte Coliseum, Charlotte, North Carolina

This was the first playoff meeting between the Hornets and the Bucks.

=== Western Conference semifinals ===
==== (1) San Antonio Spurs vs. (5) Dallas Mavericks ====
NBC

May 5
6:30 PM

Boxscore

Dallas Mavericks 78, San Antonio Spurs 94
Scoring by quarter: 11–16, 23–31, 19–29, 25–18
| Pts: Michael Finley 17; Rebs: Shawn Bradley 12; Asts: Steve Nash 6 | Pts: Tim Duncan 31; Rebs: Tim Duncan 13; Asts: Avery Johnson 8 |
San Antonio leads series, 1–0

Alamodome, San Antonio, Texas
Attendance: 32,798
Referees: Dick Bavetta, Terry Durham, Derrick Stafford

TNT

May 7
8:00 PM

Boxscore

Dallas Mavericks 86, San Antonio Spurs 100
Scoring by quarter: 18–23, 24–23, 20–29, 24–25
| Pts: Michael Finley 24; Rebs: Juwan Howard 11; Asts: Michael Finley 7 | Pts: Tim Duncan 25; Rebs: Tim Duncan 22; Asts: Terry Porter 9 |
San Antonio leads series, 2–0

Alamodome, San Antonio, Texas
Attendance: 27,690
Referees: Joe DeRosa, Steve Javie, Don Vaden

TNT

May 9
9:30 PM

Boxscore

San Antonio Spurs 104, Dallas Mavericks 90
Scoring by quarter: 26–22, 22–21, 30–11, 26–36
| Pts: David Robinson 19; Rebs: Duncan, Robinson 14 each Asts: Avery Johnson 6 | Pts: Dirk Nowitzki 15; Rebs: Greg Buckner 12; Asts: Michael Finley 5 |
San Antonio leads series, 3–0

Reunion Arena, Dallas, Texas
Attendance: 18,237
Referees: Ted Bernhardt, Joe Forte, Bennett Salvatore

NBC

May 12
3:30 PM

Boxscore

San Antonio Spurs 108, Dallas Mavericks 112
Scoring by quarter: 24–32, 33–27, 30–27, 21–26
| Pts: Tim Duncan 29; Rebs: Tim Duncan 18; Asts: Terry Porter 8 | Pts: Dirk Nowitzki 30; Rebs: Dirk Nowitzki 9 Asts: Steve Nash 14 |
San Antonio leads series, 3–1

Reunion Arena, Dallas, Texas
Attendance: 18,187
Referees: Hugh Evans, Ronnie Nunn, Eddie F. Rush

TNT

May 14
8:00 PM

Boxscore

Dallas Mavericks 87, San Antonio Spurs 105
Scoring by quarter: 21–32, 20–25, 23–22, 23–26
| Pts: Dirk Nowitzki 42; Rebs: Dirk Nowitzki 18; Asts: Eisley, Finley 4 each | Pts: Tim Duncan 32; Rebs: Tim Duncan 20; Asts: Antonio Daniels 9 |
San Antonio wins series, 4–1

Alamodome, San Antonio, Texas
Attendance: 25,853
Referees: Mike Callahan, Dan Crawford, Bernie Fryer

Regular-season series
San Antonio won 3–1 in the regular-season series

November 10, 2000

Recap

San Antonio Spurs 77, Dallas Mavericks 79

Reunion Arena, Dallas

February 13, 2001

Recap

Dallas Mavericks 92, San Antonio Spurs 104

Alamodome, San Antonio

February 24, 2001

Recap

San Antonio Spurs 107, Dallas Mavericks 104

Reunion Arena, Dallas

April 10, 2001

Recap

Dallas Mavericks 79, San Antonio Spurs 91

Alamodome, San Antonio

This was the first playoff meeting between the Mavericks and the Spurs.

==== (2) Los Angeles Lakers vs. (3) Sacramento Kings ====
NBC

May 6
3:00 PM

Boxscore

Sacramento Kings 105, Los Angeles Lakers 108
Scoring by quarter: 30–28, 24–25, 24–31, 27–24
| Pts: Chris Webber 34; Rebs: Scot Pollard 14; Asts: Jason Williams 4 | Pts: Shaquille O'Neal 44; Rebs: Shaquille O'Neal 21; Asts: Kobe Bryant 5 |
LA Lakers lead series, 1–0

Staples Center, Los Angeles, California
Attendance: 18,997
Referees: Joe Crawford, Ron Garretson, Bill Spooner

TBS

May 8
10:30 PM

Boxscore

Sacramento Kings 90, Los Angeles Lakers 96
Scoring by quarter: 15–25, 28–18, 13–31, 34–22
| Pts: Chris Webber 22; Rebs: Chris Webber 18; Asts: Bobby Jackson 4 | Pts: Shaquille O'Neal 43; Rebs: Shaquille O'Neal 20; Asts: Rick Fox 7 |
LA Lakers lead series, 2–0

Staples Center, Los Angeles, California
Attendance: 18,997
Referees: Dick Bavetta, Mike Callahan, Greg Willard

TNT

May 11
10:30 PM

Boxscore

Los Angeles Lakers 103, Sacramento Kings 81
Scoring by quarter: 29–19, 17–18, 19–17, 38–27
| Pts: Kobe Bryant 36; Rebs: Shaquille O'Neal 18; Asts: Brian Shaw 6 | Pts: Chris Webber 28; Rebs: Chris Webber 14; Asts: Doug Christie 5 |
LA Lakers lead series, 3–0

ARCO Arena, Sacramento, California
Attendance: 17,317
Referees: Ted Bernhardt, Bob Delaney, Bennett Salvatore

NBC

May 13
5:30 PM

Boxscore

Los Angeles Lakers 119, Sacramento Kings 113
Scoring by quarter: 27–22, 26–37, 27–25, 39–29
| Pts: Kobe Bryant 48; Rebs: Kobe Bryant 16; Asts: Brian Shaw 5 | Pts: Peja Stojaković 26; Rebs: Chris Webber 11; Asts: Chris Webber 8 |
LA Lakers win series, 4–0

ARCO Arena, Sacramento, California
Attendance: 17,317
Referees: Joe DeRosa, Terry Durham, Jack Nies

Regular-season series
Los Angeles won 3–1 in the regular-season series

November 16, 2000

Recap

Los Angeles Lakers 112, Sacramento Kings 110 (OT)

ARCO Arena, Sacramento, California

February 4, 2001

Recap

Sacramento Kings 94, Los Angeles Lakers 100

Staples Center, Los Angeles

March 25, 2001

Recap

Los Angeles Lakers 84, Sacramento Kings 72

ARCO Arena, Sacramento, California

March 28, 2001

Recap

Sacramento Kings 108, Los Angeles Lakers 84

Staples Center, Los Angeles

This was the ninth playoff meeting between these two teams, with the Lakers winning seven of the first eight meetings.

Previous playoff series
Los Angeles leads 7–1 in all-time playoff series

1949

Minneapolis Lakers 2, Rochester Royals 0

1949 Western Division Finals

1951

Minneapolis Lakers 1, Rochester Royals 3

1951 Western Division Finals

1952

Minneapolis Lakers 3, Rochester Royals 1

1952 Western Division Finals

1954

Minneapolis Lakers 1, Rochester Royals 0

1954 Western Division Round Robin Semifinals

1954

Minneapolis Lakers 2, Rochester Royals 1

1954 Western Division Finals

1955

Minneapolis Lakers 2, Rochester Royals 1

1955 Western Division Semifinals

1984

Los Angeles Lakers 3, Kansas City Kings 0

1984 Western Conference First Round

2000

Los Angeles Lakers 3, Sacramento Kings 2

2000 Western Conference First Round

== Conference finals ==
=== Eastern Conference finals ===
==== (1) Philadelphia 76ers vs. (2) Milwaukee Bucks ====
TNT

May 22
8:30 PM

Boxscore

Milwaukee Bucks 85, Philadelphia 76ers 93
Scoring by quarter: 19–19, 16–32, 28–19, 22–23
| Pts: Ray Allen 31; Rebs: Ervin Johnson 15; Asts: Allen, Cassell 7 each | Pts: Allen Iverson 34; Rebs: Dikembe Mutombo 18; Asts: Iverson, Snow 6 each |
Philadelphia leads series, 1–0

First Union Center, Philadelphia, Pennsylvania
Attendance: 20,877
Referees: Joe Crawford, Terry Durham, Joe Forte

TNT

May 24
8:30 PM

Boxscore

Milwaukee Bucks 92, Philadelphia 76ers 78
Scoring by quarter: 32–16, 17–21, 20–20, 23–21
| Pts: Ray Allen 38; Rebs: Ervin Johnson 7 Asts: Sam Cassell 11 | Pts: Aaron McKie 21; Rebs: Dikembe Mutombo 20; Asts: Allen Iverson 9 |
Series tied, 1–1

First Union Center, Philadelphia, Pennsylvania
Attendance: 20,998
Referees: Joe DeRosa, Ron Garretson, Steve Javie

NBC

May 26
5:30 PM

Boxscore

Philadelphia 76ers 74, Milwaukee Bucks 80
Scoring by quarter: 17–24, 22–19, 21–26, 14–11
| Pts: Aaron McKie 22; Rebs: Dikembe Mutombo 10; Asts: Aaron McKie 5 | Pts: Sam Cassell 24; Rebs: Ervin Johnson 13; Asts: Ray Allen 5 |
Milwaukee leads series, 2–1

Bradley Center, Milwaukee, Wisconsin
Attendance: 18,717
Referees: Bob Delaney, Hugh Evans, Don Vaden

NBC

May 28
5:30 PM

Boxscore

Philadelphia 76ers 89, Milwaukee Bucks 83
Scoring by quarter: 24–22, 16–20, 29–20, 20–21
| Pts: Allen Iverson 28; Rebs: Dikembe Mutombo 15; Asts: Aaron McKie 9 | Pts: Glenn Robinson 20; Rebs: Ervin Johnson 17; Asts: Ray Allen 6 |
Series tied, 2–2

Bradley Center, Milwaukee, Wisconsin
Attendance: 18,717
Referees: Dick Bavetta, Ted Bernhardt, Dan Crawford

NBC

May 30
9:00 PM

Boxscore

Milwaukee Bucks 88, Philadelphia 76ers 89
Scoring by quarter: 29–21, 22–21, 19–28, 18–19
| Pts: Glenn Robinson 22; Rebs: Sam Cassell 12; Asts: Allen, Cassell 4 each | Pts: Dikembe Mutombo 21; Rebs: Dikembe Mutombo 13; Asts: Allen Iverson 8 |
Philadelphia leads series, 3–2

First Union Center, Philadelphia, Pennsylvania
Attendance: 21,087
Referees: Bernie Fryer, Ronnie Nunn, Bennett Salvatore

NBC

June 1
9:00 PM

Boxscore

Philadelphia 76ers 100, Milwaukee Bucks 110
Scoring by quarter: 15–25, 16–35, 23–20, 46–30
| Pts: Allen Iverson 46; Rebs: Dikembe Mutombo 14; Asts: Aaron McKie 9 | Pts: Ray Allen 41; Rebs: Ervin Johnson 12; Asts: Sam Cassell 11 |
Series tied, 3–3

Bradley Center, Milwaukee, Wisconsin
Attendance: 18,717
Referees: Joe Crawford, Jack Nies, Eddie F. Rush

NBC

June 3
7:30 PM

Boxscore

Milwaukee Bucks 91, Philadelphia 76ers 108
Scoring by quarter: 26–25, 24–31, 21–26, 20–26
| Pts: Ray Allen 26; Rebs: Tim Thomas 12; Asts: Ray Allen 6 | Pts: Allen Iverson 44; Rebs: Dikembe Mutombo 19; Asts: Aaron McKie 13 |
Philadelphia wins series, 4–3

First Union Center, Philadelphia, Pennsylvania
Attendance: 21,046
Referees: Dan Crawford, Hugh Evans, Steve Javie

Regular-season series
Tied 2–2 in the regular-season series

February 13, 2001

Recap

Philadelphia 76ers 107, Milwaukee Bucks 104

Bradley Center, Milwaukee, Wisconsin

February 26, 2001

Recap

Milwaukee Bucks 98, Philadelphia 76ers 91

First Union Center, Philadelphia

March 17, 2001

Recap

Philadelphia 76ers 78, Milwaukee Bucks 87

Bradley Center, Milwaukee, Wisconsin

March 26, 2001

Recap

Milwaukee Bucks 78, Philadelphia 76ers 90

First Union Center, Philadelphia

This was the ninth playoff meeting between these two teams, with the 76ers winning five of the first eight meetings.

Previous playoff series
Philadelphia leads 5–3 in all-time playoff series

1970

Milwaukee Bucks 4, Philadelphia 76ers 1

1970 Eastern Division Semifinals

1981

Milwaukee Bucks 3, Philadelphia 76ers 4

1981 Eastern Conference Semifinals

1982

Milwaukee Bucks 2, Philadelphia 76ers 4

1982 Eastern Conference Semifinals

1983

Milwaukee Bucks 1, Philadelphia 76ers 4

1983 Eastern Conference Finals

1985

Milwaukee Bucks 0, Philadelphia 76ers 4

1985 Eastern Conference Semifinals

1986

Milwaukee Bucks 4, Philadelphia 76ers 3

1986 Eastern Conference Semifinals

1987

Milwaukee Bucks 3, Philadelphia 76ers 2

1987 Eastern Conference First Round

1991

Milwaukee Bucks 0, Philadelphia 76ers 3

1991 Eastern Conference First Round

=== Western Conference finals ===
==== (1) San Antonio Spurs vs. (2) Los Angeles Lakers ====
NBC

May 19
6:30 PM

Boxscore

Los Angeles Lakers 104, San Antonio Spurs 90
Scoring by quarter: 24–17, 27–25, 29–24, 24–24
| Pts: Kobe Bryant 45; Rebs: Shaquille O'Neal 11; Asts: Horace Grant 6 | Pts: Tim Duncan 28; Rebs: Tim Duncan 14; Asts: Tim Duncan 6 |
LA Lakers lead series, 1–0

Alamodome, San Antonio, Texas
Attendance: 36,068
Referees: Joe Crawford, Joe Forte, Ron Garretson

TNT

May 21
8:30 PM

Boxscore

Los Angeles Lakers 88, San Antonio Spurs 81
Scoring by quarter: 21–22, 17–24, 28–21, 22–14
| Pts: Kobe Bryant 28; Rebs: Shaquille O'Neal 14; Asts: Kobe Bryant 6 | Pts: Tim Duncan 40; Rebs: Tim Duncan 15; Asts: Antonio Daniels 5 |
LA Lakers lead series, 2–0

Alamodome, San Antonio, Texas
Attendance: 35,574
Referees: Ted Bernhardt, Bob Delaney, Hugh Evans

NBC

May 25
9:00 PM

Boxscore

San Antonio Spurs 72, Los Angeles Lakers 111
Scoring by quarter: 21–34, 23–20, 20–32, 8–25
| Pts: David Robinson 24; Rebs: Tim Duncan 13; Asts: Tim Duncan 7 | Pts: Kobe Bryant 36; Rebs: Shaquille O'Neal 17; Asts: Kobe Bryant 8 |
LA Lakers lead series, 3–0

Staples Center, Los Angeles, California
Attendance: 18,997
Referees: Dan Crawford, Jack Nies, Ronnie Nunn

NBC

May 27
5:30 PM

Boxscore

San Antonio Spurs 82, Los Angeles Lakers 111
Scoring by quarter: 23–33, 18–31, 25–22, 16–25
| Pts: Daniels, Duncan 15 each Rebs: David Robinson 11; Asts: Terry Porter 4 | Pts: Derek Fisher 28; Rebs: Shaquille O'Neal 10; Asts: Kobe Bryant 11 |
LA Lakers win series, 4–0

Staples Center, Los Angeles, California
Attendance: 18,997
Referees: Bernie Fryer, Eddie F. Rush, Bennett Salvatore

Regular-season series
Tied 2–2 in the regular-season series

November 8, 2000

Recap

Los Angeles Lakers 81, San Antonio Spurs 91

Alamodome, San Antonio

December 1, 2000

Recap

San Antonio Spurs 100, Los Angeles Lakers 109

Staples Center, Los Angeles

February 21, 2001

Recap

Los Angeles Lakers 101, San Antonio Spurs 99

Alamodome, San Antonio

March 9, 2001

Recap

San Antonio Spurs 93, Los Angeles Lakers 89 (OT)

Staples Center, Los Angeles

This was the seventh playoff meeting between these two teams, with the Lakers winning four of the first six meetings.

Previous playoff series
Los Angeles leads 4–2 in all-time playoff series

1982

Los Angeles Lakers 4, San Antonio Spurs 0

1982 Western Conference Finals

1983

Los Angeles Lakers 4, San Antonio Spurs 2

1983 Western Conference Finals

1986

Los Angeles Lakers 3, San Antonio Spurs 0

1986 Western Conference First Round

1988

Los Angeles Lakers 3, San Antonio Spurs 0

1988 Western Conference First Round

1995

Los Angeles Lakers 2, San Antonio Spurs 4

1995 Western Conference Semifinals

1999

Los Angeles Lakers 0, San Antonio Spurs 4

1999 Western Conference Semifinals

== NBA Finals: (W2) Los Angeles Lakers vs. (E1) Philadelphia 76ers ==
NBC

June 6
9:00 PM

Boxscore

Philadelphia 76ers 107, Los Angeles Lakers 101 (OT)
Scoring by quarter: 22–23, 34–27, 23–27, 15–17, Overtime: 13–7
| Pts: Allen Iverson 48; Rebs: Dikembe Mutombo 16; Asts: Aaron McKie 9 | Pts: Shaquille O'Neal 44; Rebs: Shaquille O'Neal 20; Asts: three players 5 each |
Philadelphia leads series, 1–0

Staples Center, Los Angeles, California
Attendance: 18,997
Referees: Dick Bavetta, Joe Crawford, Ron Garretson

NBC

June 8
9:00 PM

Boxscore

Philadelphia 76ers 89, Los Angeles Lakers 98
Scoring by quarter: 24–25, 23–24, 20–28, 22–21
| Pts: Allen Iverson 23; Rebs: Dikembe Mutombo 13; Asts: Aaron McKie 6 | Pts: Kobe Bryant 31; Rebs: Shaquille O'Neal 20; Asts: Shaquille O'Neal 9 |
Series tied, 1–1

Staples Center, Los Angeles, California
Attendance: 18,997
Referees: Bernie Fryer, Steve Javie, Ronnie Nunn

NBC

June 10
7:30 PM

Boxscore

Los Angeles Lakers 96, Philadelphia 76ers 91
Scoring by quarter: 25–25, 30–20, 18–21, 23–25
| Pts: Kobe Bryant 32; Rebs: Shaquille O'Neal 12; Asts: four players 3 each | Pts: Allen Iverson 35; Rebs: Iverson, Mutombo 12 each Asts: Aaron McKie 8 |
LA Lakers lead series, 2–1

First Union Center, Philadelphia, Pennsylvania
Attendance: 20,900
Referees: Dan Crawford, Bob Delaney, Bennett Salvatore

NBC

June 13
9:00 PM

Boxscore

Los Angeles Lakers 100, Philadelphia 76ers 86
Scoring by quarter: 22–14, 29–23, 26–22, 23–27
| Pts: Shaquille O'Neal 34; Rebs: Shaquille O'Neal 14; Asts: Kobe Bryant 9 | Pts: Allen Iverson 35; Rebs: Dikembe Mutombo 9 Asts: Iverson, Snow 4 each |
LA Lakers lead series, 3–1

First Union Center, Philadelphia, Pennsylvania
Attendance: 20,896
Referees: Hugh Evans, Jack Nies, Eddie F. Rush

NBC

June 15
9:00 PM

Boxscore

Los Angeles Lakers 108, Philadelphia 76ers 96
Scoring by quarter: 24–27, 28–21, 31–20, 25–28
| Pts: Shaquille O'Neal 29; Rebs: Shaquille O'Neal 13; Asts: Bryant, Fox 6 each | Pts: Allen Iverson 37; Rebs: Tyrone Hill 13; Asts: Eric Snow 12 |
LA Lakers win series, 4–1

First Union Center, Philadelphia, Pennsylvania
Attendance: 20,890
Referees: Dick Bavetta, Joe Crawford, Bernie Fryer

- In Game 1, Allen Iverson scored 48 points in his first-ever Finals game as the 76ers ended Lakers' 11-game playoff winning streak (19 overall) and ended the Lakers' perfect playoff run that season.

Regular-season series
Tied 1–1 in the regular-season series

December 5, 2000

Recap

Philadelphia 76ers 85, Los Angeles Lakers 96

Staples Center, Los Angeles

February 14, 2001

Recap

Los Angeles Lakers 97, Philadelphia 76ers 112

First Union Center, Philadelphia

This was the sixth playoff meeting between these two teams, with the Lakers winning four of the first five meetings.

Previous playoff series
Los Angeles leads 4–1 in all-time playoff series

1950

Minneapolis Lakers 4, Syracuse Nationals 2

1950 NBA Finals

1954

Minneapolis Lakers 4, Syracuse Nationals 3

1954 NBA Finals

1980

Los Angeles Lakers 4, Philadelphia 76ers 2

1980 NBA Finals

1982

Los Angeles Lakers 4, Philadelphia 76ers 2

1982 NBA Finals

1983

Los Angeles Lakers 0, Philadelphia 76ers 4

1983 NBA Finals

== Statistical leaders ==
| Category | Game high | | | Average | | | |
| Category | Player | Team | High | Player | Team | Avg. | GP |
|---|---|---|---|---|---|---|---|
| Points | Allen Iverson | Philadelphia 76ers | 54 | Tracy McGrady | Orlando Magic | 33.8 | 4 |
| Rebounds | Tim Duncan; Dikembe Mutombo | San Antonio Spurs; Philadelphia 76ers | 22 | Shaquille O'Neal | Los Angeles Lakers | 15.4 | 16 |
| Assists | John Stockton | Utah Jazz | 18 | Jason Kidd | Phoenix Suns | 13.3 | 4 |
| Steals | Allen Iverson | Philadelphia 76ers | 7 | Baron Davis | Charlotte Hornets | 2.8 | 10 |
| Blocks | Shaquille O'Neal | Los Angeles Lakers | 8 | Dikembe Mutombo | Philadelphia 76ers | 3.1 | 23 |
