= List of Continental Basketball Association seasons =

The Continental Basketball Association (CBA)—and its previous incarnations as the Eastern Pennsylvania Basketball League, the Eastern Professional Basketball League (EPBL) and the Eastern Basketball Association (EBA)—was a professional basketball league which lasted 63 seasons from 1946 to 2009.

== 1978–79 season ==
Teams

- Allentown Jets
- Anchorage Northern Knights
- Baltimore Metros (relocated to Utica, New York midseason)
- Jersey Shore Bullets
- Lancaster Red Roses
- Maine Lumberjacks
- Mohawk Valley Thunderbirds (relocated from Baltimore, Maryland midseason)
- Rochester Zeniths
- Wilkes-Barre Barons

Regular season standings

Team	W	L	PCT	GB
Northern Division
Rochester Zeniths	36	12	.750	—
Anchorage Northern Knights	27	22	.551	9.5
Jersey Shore Bullets	22	26	.458	14
Maine Lumberjacks	17	30	.362	18.5
Southern Division
Wilkes-Barre Barons	22	22	.500	—
Allentown Jets	20	21	.488	.5
Lancaster Red Roses	14	26	.350	6
Mohawk Valley Thunderbirds^{§}	16	15	.516	—

^{§} Mohawk Valley Thunderbirds disbanded midseason

Timeline

- July 1978: the CBA board of directors unanimously approved the admittance of the Rochester Zeniths to the league. The Zeniths were previously members of the All-American Basketball Alliance. The EBA announced that the Providence Shooting Stars were folding due to unpaid debts. The league allowed the Long Island Ducks and the Brooklyn Dodgers to attempt to find financial backing.
- February 17, 1979: the Anchorage Northern Knights set CBA records for team points in a game with 183 and, points in a single half with 99 in the second half, and field goals in a game with 74.

Postseason

CBA First Round
4	Jersey Shore	1
5	Allentown	2

CBA Semifinals
1	Rochester	3
5	Allentown	1
2	Anchorage	3
3	Wilkes-Barre	1

CBA Championship Series
1	Rochester	4
2	Anchorage	0

NBA affiliates

CBA Team	NBA Affiliates	Reference
Baltimore Metros	Washington Bullets, Atlanta Hawks, Milwaukee Bucks	

== 1979–80 season ==
Teams

- Anchorage Northern Knights
- Hawaii Volcanos
- Lancaster Red Roses
- Lehigh Valley Jets
- Maine Lumberjacks
- Pennsylvania Barons
- Rochester Zeniths
- Utica Olympics

Regular season standings

Team	W	L	PCT	GB
Northern Division
Rochester Zeniths	31	15	.674	—
Anchorage Northern Knights	29	16	.644	1.5
Maine Lumberjacks	21	23	.477	9
Hawaii Volcanos	20	25	.444	10.5
Southern Division
Lehigh Valley Jets	19	12	.613	—
Pennsylvania Barons	14	17	.452	5
Lancaster Red Roses	12	24	.353	8.5
Utica Olympics	15	31	.326	12

Timeline

- April 1, 1980: Maine Lumberjacks player Charles Jones had a CBA record 26 rebounds in a game. Maine lost the Eastern Conference Finals game to the Rochester Zeniths, 140–132.

Postseason

CBA Semifinals
3	Maine	2
5	Lehigh Valley	0
1	Rochester	2
6	Pennsylvania	0

CBA Conference Finals
1	Rochester	2
3	Maine	0
2	Anchorage	3
4	Hawaii	2

CBA Championship Series
1	Rochester	3
2	Anchorage	4

== 1980–81 season ==
Teams

- Alberta Dusters
- Anchorage Northern Knights
- Atlantic City Hi-Rollers
- Billings Volcanos
- Lehigh Valley Jets
- Maine Lumberjacks
- Montana Golden Nuggets
- Philadelphia Kings
- Rochester Zeniths
- Scranton Aces

Regular season standings

Team	W	L	PCT	GB
Eastern Division
Rochester Zeniths	34	6	.850	—
Atlantic City Hi-Rollers	22	18	.550	12
Philadelphia Kings	17	23	.425	17
Lehigh Valley Jets	16	24	.400	18
Maine Lumberjacks	16	24	.400	18
Scranton Aces	13	27	.325	`21
Western Division
Montana Golden Nuggets	27	15	.643	—
Anchorage Northern Knights	25	17	.595	2
Billings Volcanos	23	19	.548	4
Alberta Dusters	11	31	.262	16

Timeline

- July to October 1980: After Darryl Dawkins shattered two basketball backboards during his 1979–80 NBA season, the CBA implemented a collapsible hinged rim for the 1980–81 season. The design was chosen from 10 prototypes which were set up in a New York City high school gymnasium in the summer of 1980. Unidentified college basketball players were asked to try to break the rims and the three strongest designs were chosen for a trail run in the CBA. All three rims broke away from the backboard and snapped back in place. The NBA implemented one of the CBA's designs the following season.

== 1981–82 season ==
Teams

- Alberta Dusters
- Anchorage Northern Knights
- Billings Volcanos
- Lancaster Lightning
- Maine Lumberjacks
- Montana Golden Nuggets
- Rochester Zeniths
- Wildwood Hi-Rollers

Regular season standings

Team	W	L	PCT	QW	Points
Eastern Division
Lancaster Lightning	34	12	.739	105	207
Rochester Zeniths	29	17	.630	102	189
Maine Lumberjacks	18	28	.391	81.5	135.5
Wildwood Hi-Rollers	15	31	.326	84	129
Western Division
Billings Volcanoes	32	14	.696	106	202
Montana Golden Nuggets	30	16	.652	104	194
Alberta Dusters	12	34	.261	81.5	117.5
Anchorage Northern Knights	14	32	.304	72	114

NBA affiliates

CBA Team	NBA Affiliates	References
Billings Volcanoes	Chicago Bulls, Phoenix Suns, Utah Jazz	

== 1982–83 season ==
Teams

- Albany Patroons
- Albuquerque Silvers (relocated from Las Vegas, Nevada midseason)
- Billings Volcanos
- Detroit Spirits
- Lancaster Lightning
- Las Vegas Silvers (relocated to Albuquerque, New Mexico midseason)
- Maine Lumberjacks
- Montana Golden Nuggets
- Ohio Mixers
- Rochester Zeniths
- Reno Bighorns
- Wisconsin Flyers
- Wyoming Wildcatters

Regular season standings

Team	W	L	PCT	QW	Points
Eastern Division
Rochester Zeniths	29	15	.659	106.5	193.5
Lancaster Lightning	30	14	.682	95.5	185.5
Maine Lumberjacks	22	22	.500	88.0	154.0
Albany Patroons	16	28	.364	75.5	123.5
Central Division
Detroit Spirits	26	18	.591	92.0	170.0
Ohio Mixers	17	27	.386	81.5	132.5
Wisconsin Flyers	14	30	.318	78.0	120.0
Western Division
Montana Golden Nuggets	33	11	.750	104.0	203.0
Wyoming Wildcatters	22	22	.500	86.0	152.0
Billings Volcanos	20	24	.454	86.0	146.0
Las Vegas/Albuquerque Silvers	17	27	.386	85.0	136.0
Reno Bighorns	18	26	.409	78.0	132.0

Timeline

- January 30, 1982: The 1982 CBA All-Star Game at Meadowlands Arena in East Rutherford, New Jersey was the first nationally televised CBA game. It was broadcast on the USA Network.
League map
Locations of CBA teams during the 1982–83 season

== 1983–84 season ==
Teams

- Albany Patroons
- Albuquerque Silvers
- Bay State Bombardiers
- Detroit Spirits
- Lancaster Lightning
- Louisville Catbirds
- Ohio Mixers
- Puerto Rico Coquis
- Sarasota Stingers
- Toronto Tornados
- Wisconsin Flyers
- Wyoming Wildcatters

Regular season standings

Team	W	L	PCT	QW	Points
Eastern Division
Puerto Rico Coquis	28	16	.636	98	182
Albany Patroons	25	19	.568	89.5	164.5
Bay State Bombardiers	22	22	.500	95	161
Lancaster Lightning	24	20	.545	88.5	160.5
Sarasota Stingers	16	28	.364	81.5	129.5
Toronto Tornados	16	28	.364	74	122
Western Division
Wisconsin Flyers	27	17	.614	101	182
Detroit Spirits	26	18	.591	89	167
Wyoming Wildcatters	23	21	.523	93.5	162.5
Ohio Mixers	23	21	.523	88	157
Louisville Catbirds	23	21	.523	87	156
Albuquerque Silvers	11	33	.250	71	104

NBA affiliates

CBA Team	NBA Affiliates	Reference
Albany Patroons	Denver Nuggets, New York Knicks	
Albuquerque Silvers	Los Angeles Lakers, Seattle SuperSonics	
Bay State Bombardiers	Boston Celtics, Houston Rockets	
Detroit Spirits	Detroit Pistons, Dallas Mavericks	
Lancaster Lightning	Cleveland Cavaliers, Philadelphia 76ers	
Louisville Catbirds	Washington Bullets, Portland Trail Blazers, Utah Jazz	
Ohio Mixers	Atlanta Hawks, San Antonio Spurs	
Puerto Rico Cocuis	New Jersey Nets, Portland Trail Blazers	
Sarasota Stingers	Kansas City Kings, Utah Jazz	
Toronto Tornadoes	Chicago Bulls, Golden State Warriors	
Wisconsin Flyers	Indiana Pacers, Milwaukee Bucks	
Wyoming Wildcatters	Phoenix Suns, San Diego Clippers	

== 1984–85 season ==
Teams

- Albany Patroons
- Albuquerque Silvers
- Bay State Bombardiers
- Cincinnati Slammers
- Detroit Spirits
- Evansville Thunder
- Lancaster Lightning
- Louisville Catbirds
- Puerto Rico Coquis
- Sarasota Stingers
- Tampa Bay Thrillers
- Toronto Tornados
- Wisconsin Flyers
- Wyoming Wildcatters

Regular season standings

Team	W	L	PCT	QW	Points
Eastern Division
Albany Patroons	34	14	.708	118.5	220.5
Tampa Bay Thrillers	35	13	.729	108	213
Lancaster Lightning	28	20	.583	102.5	186.5
Toronto Tornados	26	22	.542	101.5	179.5
Puerto Rico Coquis	27	21	.562	98.5	179.5
Bay State Bombardiers	20	28	.417	93	153
Sarasota Stingers	21	27	.438	89.5	152.5
Western Division
Wyoming Wildcatters	24	24	.500	99	171
Evansville Thunder	23	25	.479	95.5	164.5
Detroit Spirits	23	25	.479	94	163
Wisconsin Flyers	21	27	.438	91	154
Louisville Catbirds	19	29	.396	92.5	149.5
Cincinnati Slammers	17	31	.354	84	135
Albuquerque Silvers	18	30	.375	76.5	130.5

Timeline

- February 1984: To keep travel costs down, the CBA barred teams from bringing their assistant coach(s) on road trips. The Albany Patroons were fined $1,200 after assistant coach Charley Rosen accompanied the team on a road trip to Puerto Rico. The Partoons later skirted the rule by classifying Rosen as a trainer, as teams were permitted to have a trainer travel with them.
- May 21, 1984: During the annual board of directors meeting CBA commissioner Jim Drucker announced plans for expansion to at least 13 cities. Drucker also unveiled his plans for "CBA East", a developmental league for the CBA which would be the third-tier men's professional basketball league in the United States behind the CBA and the NBA, respectively. Possible sites for the CBA East franchises were Columbia, Maryland; Trenton, New Jersey; Springfield, Massachusetts; Syracuse, New York; Scranton, Pennsylvania; Allentown, Pennsylvania; Wilkes-Barre, Pennsylvania; Wilmington, Delaware; and Long Island, New York. Drucker was quoted by UPI reporter David Nathan, "This year the CBA will take off [...] We're moving into larger markets and I have no doubt the CBA East will exist". Rule changes were adopted which included a change to three point fouls where the shooter would be granted three free throws as opposed to two. A rule similar to the clear path foul was adopted where a foul on a "uncontested breakaway" would result in an automatic two points and possession of the ball. Rosters were decreased from 10 spots to nine. The board of directors approved an expansion franchise in Evansville, Indiana and another in Hartford, Connecticut contingent on the required ticket sales. Changes to the CBA drug policy were described by UPI's David Nathan, "a tough drug policy, much like the NBA's".
- May 22, 1984: The CBA board of directors approved the re-location of the Ohio Mixers from Lima, Ohio to Cincinnati, Ohio. Cincinnati's last professional basketball team was the NBA Cincinnati Royals who left the city in 1972 for Kansas City.
- September 7, 1984: The CBA announced it had signed a broadcasting agreement with Black Entertainment Television to air 15 games during the 1984–85 season.
- October 28, 1984: A game between the Soviet Union men's national basketball team and a team composed of CBA players was held in Albany, New York. The Soviet team was without Arvydas Sabonis who was sidelined with a foot injury. The Soviet team defeated the CBA team by a score of 77–72. Vladimir Tkachenko and Šarūnas Marčiulionis of the Soviet team led all scorers with 18 points a piece. Kenny Natt of the CBA club led his team with 16 points. Other CBA players included Billy Goodwin, Derrick Rowland, Lowes Moore and Cozell McQueen.
- February 16, 1985: CBA commissioner Jim Drucker and the league was profiled in a UPI article by Joe Juliano titled "CBA is providing games, gimmicks". Juliano notes that one of Drucker's strategies for promotions are unique like the "Ton of Money CBA Free Throw" in which a randomly selected spectator is given a chance to make two shots from the free throw line for a chance at 5,000 pennies ($5,000). When asked about the gimmicks and promotions Drucker responded, "You can't touch anything at a basketball game [...] so we've got to be able to guarantee our fans 10 memorable moments, five of which are totally detached from the game. We have to guarantee that our fans go home happy." Other promotions included "The 1 Million Dollar CBA Supershot" where a spectator could win $50,000 a year over 20 years if they made a shot from 69 feet and 9 inches away from the basket. The "Fly In, Drive Away" promotion gave spectators a chance to fly a paper airplane into the sunroof of a vehicle for a chance to win its title. During the 1977 season the expansion franchise fee was $5,000 as opposed to the $500,000 fee in 1985. Drucker laid out his plans for further expansion to the UPI telling Juliano there was inquiries from investors in San Diego, California; Fort Wayne, Indiana; Vancouver, British Columbia and Tacoma, Washington. Drucker also announced plans for a league called the "CBA East" which would be a developmental league for the CBA. He said the CBA East would begin during the 1985–86 season.

NBA affiliates

CBA Team	NBA Affiliates	Reference
Albany Patroons	New York Knicks, Houston Rockets	
Albuquerque Silvers	Cleveland Cavaliers, Utah Jazz	
Bay State Bombarders	Portland Trail Blazers, Boston Celtics	
Cincinnati Slammers	Atlanta Hawks, San Antonio Spurs	
Detroit Spirits	Detroit Pistons, Boston Celtics	
Lancaster Lightning	Philadelphia 76ers, Washington Bullets	
Louisville Catbirds	Denver Nuggets, Washington Bullets	
Puerto Rico Coquis	New Jersey Nets, Seattle SuperSonics	
Sarasota Stingers	Kansas City Kings, San Antonio Spurs	
Tampa Bay Thrillers	Indiana Pacers, Los Angeles Clippers	
Toronto Tornados	Chicago Bulls, Golden State Warriors	
Wisconsin Flyers	Milwaukee Bucks, Houston Rockets	
Wyoming Wildcatters	Phoenix Suns, San Diego Clippers	

== 1985–86 season ==
Teams

- Albany Patroons
- Baltimore Lightning
- Bay State Bombardiers
- Cincinnati Slammers
- Detroit Spirits
- Evansville Thunder
- Florida Stingers
- Kansas City Sizzlers
- La Crosse Catbirds
- Maine Windjammers
- Pensacola Tornados
- Tampa Bay Thrillers
- Wisconsin Flyers
- Wyoming Wildcatters

Regular season standings

Team	W	L	PCT	QW	Points
Eastern Division
Tampa Bay Thrillers	34	14	.708	109	211
Bay State Bombardiers	30	18	.625	105	195
Baltimore Lightning	26	22	.542	101	179
Albany Patroons	24	24	.500	99.5	171.5
Florida Stingers	21	27	.438	99	162
Maine Windjammers	18	30	.375	84	138
Toronto/Pensacola Tornadoes	15	33	.312	81.5	126.5
Western Division
Cincinnati Slammers	33	15	.688	102.5	201.5
Evansville Thunder	25	23	.521	97.5	172.5
Detroit Spirits	24	24	.500	100	172
La Crosse Catbirds	24	24	.500	98.5	170.5
Kansas City Sizzlers	25	23	.521	94	169
Wyoming Wildcatters	21	27	.438	93	156
Wisconsin Flyers	16	32	.333	79.5	127.5

NBA affiliates

CBA Team	NBA Affiliates	Reference
Kansas City Sizzlers	San Antonio Spurs, Los Angeles Lakers	

== 1986–87 season ==
Teams

- Albany Patroons
- Charleston Gunners
- Cincinnati Slammers
- Jacksonville Jets (relocated to Biloxi, Mississippi midseason)
- La Crosse Catbirds
- Mississippi Jets (relocated from Jacksonville, Florida midseason)
- Pensacola Tornados
- Rapid City Thrillers
- Rockford Lightning
- Savannah Spirits
- Topeka Sizzlers
- Wisconsin Flyers
- Wyoming Wildcatters

Regular season standings

Team	W	L	PCT	QW	Points
Eastern Division
Tampa Bay Thrillers	34	14	.708	119	221
Albany Patroons	26	22	.542	96.5	174.5
Jacksonville/Mississippi Jets	26	22	.542	93	171
Pensacola Tornados	20	28	.417	97	157
Charleston Gunners	20	28	.417	82.5	142.5
Savannah Spirits	20	28	.417	80.5	140.5
Western Division
La Crosse Catbirds	28	20	.583	103	187
Cincinnati Slammers	25	23	.521	108.5	183.5
Topeka Sizzlers	24	24	.500	91.5	163.5
Rockford Lightning	22	26	.458	95.5	161.5
Wyoming Wildcatters	21	27	.438	97.5	160.5
Wisconsin Flyers	22	26	.458	87.5	153.5

== 1987–88 season ==
Teams

- Albany Patroons
- Charleston Gunners
- La Crosse Catbirds
- Mississippi Jets
- Pensacola Tornados
- Quad City Thunder
- Rapid City Thrillers
- Rochester Flyers
- Rockford Lightning
- Savannah Spirits
- Topeka Sizzlers
- Wyoming Wildcatters

Regular season standings

Team	W	L	PCT	QW	Points
Eastern Division
Albany Patroons	48	6	.889	149.5	293.5
Pensacola Tornados	28	26	.519	101.5	185.5
Mississippi Jets	25	29	.463	107.5	182.5
Savannah Spirits	22	32	.407	100	166
Topeka Sizzlers	21	33	.389	100.5	163.5
Charleston Gunners	14	40	.259	88	130
Western Division
La Crosse Catbirds	40	14	.741	122	242
Rockford Lightning	37	17	.685	118.5	229.5
Quad City Thunder	30	24	.556	118.5	208.5
Wyoming Wildcatters	23	31	.426	104.5	173.5
Rochester Flyers	20	34	.370	104.5	164.5
Rapid City Thrillers	16	38	.296	81	129

NBA affiliations

CBA Team	NBA Affiliates	Reference
Albany Patroons	Boston Celtics, New York Knicks	
Chareston Gunners	Cleveland Cavaliers, Golden State Warriors	
La Crosse Catbirds	Milwaukee Bucks, Washington Bullets	
Mississippi Jets	Detroit Pistons, Sacramento Kings	
Pensacola Tornadoes	Los Angeles Clippers, San Antonio Spurs	
Quad City Thunder	Houston Rockets, Portland Trail Blazers	
Rapid City Thrillers	Indiana Pacers, Washington Bullets	
Rochester Flyers	Dallas Mavericks, Denver Nuggets	
Rockford Lightning	Chicago Bulls, Phoenix Suns	
Savannah Spirits	Atlanta Hawks, New Jersey Nets	
Topeka Sizzlers	Los Angeles Lakers, Philadelphia 76ers	
Wyoming Wildcatters	Utah Jazz, Seattle SuperSonics	

== 1988–89 season ==
Teams

- Albany Patroons
- Cedar Rapids Silver Bullets
- Charleston Gunners
- La Crosse Catbirds
- Pensacola Tornados
- Quad City Thunder
- Rapid City Thrillers
- Rochester Flyers
- Rockford Lightning
- Topeka Sizzlers
- Tulsa Fast Breakers
- Wichita Falls Texans

Regular season standings

Team	W	L	PCT	QW	Points
Eastern Division
Albany Patroons	36	18	.667	125.5	233.5
Tulsa Fast Breakers	28	26	.519	114	198
Pensacola Tornados	30	24	.556	104.5	194.5
Wichita Falls Texans	23	31	.426	104.5	173.5
Charleston Gunners	20	34	.370	97.5	157.5
Topeka Sizzlers	14	40	.259	83	125
Western Division
Rapid City Thrillers	38	16	.704	131.5	245.5
Quad City Thunder	36	18	.667	122.5	230.5
Rockford Lightning	34	20	.630	121.5	223.5
Cedar Rapids Silver Bullets	30	24	.556	100.5	190.5
La Crosse Catbirds	19	35	.352	103	160
Rochester Flyers	16	38	.296	88	136

NBA affiliates

CBA team	NBA Affiliations	Reference
Albany Patroons	New York Knicks, Washington Bullets	
Cedar Rapids Silver Bullets	Portland Trail Blazers, Golden State Warriors, Sacramento Kings	
Charleston Gunners	Charlotte Hornets, Indiana Pacers	
La Crosse Catbirds	Milwaukee Bucks, Atlanta Hawks	
Pensacola Tornados	Los Angeles Clippers, Cleveland Cavaliers	
Quad City Thunder	Houston Rockets, Seattle SuperSonics	
Rapid City Thrillers	Denver Nuggets, Miami Heat, Indiana Pacers	
Rochester Flyers	Detroit Pistons, Utah Jazz	
Rockford Lighting	Chicago Bulls, Boston Celtics	
Topeka Sizzlers	Philadelphia 76ers, Los Angeles Lakers	
Tulsa Fast Breakers	New Jersey Nets, San Antonio Spurs	
Wichita Falls Texans	Dallas Mavericks, Phoenix Suns	

== 1989–90 season ==
Teams

- Albany Patroons
- Cedar Rapids Silver Bullets
- Columbus Horizon
- Grand Rapids Hoops
- La Crosse Catbirds
- Omaha Racers
- Pensacola Tornados
- Quad City Thunder
- Rapid City Thrillers
- Rockford Lightning
- San Jose Jammers
- Santa Barbara Islanders
- Sioux Falls Skyforce
- Topeka Sizzlers
- Tulsa Fast Breakers
- Wichita Falls Texans

Regular season standings

Team	W	L	PCT	QW	Points
Eastern Division
Albany Patroons	41	15	.732	136.5	259.5
Pensacola Tornados	32	24	.571	116.5	212.5
Grand Rapids Hoops	26	30	.464	110.5	188.5
Columbus Horizon	18	38	.321	97	151
Central Division
La Crosse Catbirds	42	14	.750	127.5	253.5
Quad City Thunder	34	22	.607	130.5	232.5
Cedar Rapids Silver Bullets	25	31	.446	110	185
Rockford Lightning	22	34	.393	108.5	174.5
Midwest Division
Rapid City Thrillers	42	14	.750	123.5	249.5
Omaha Racers	29	27	.518	118	205
Sioux Falls Skyforce	20	36	.357	101	161
Topeka Sizzlers	10	46	.179	85	115
Western Division
Santa Barbara Islanders	37	19	.661	112	223
Tulsa Fast Breakers	31	25	.554	117	210
San Jose Jammers	23	33	.411	106.5	175.5
Wichita Falls Texans	16	40	.286	92	140

League map
Locations of CBA teams during the 1989–1990 season

NBA affiliates

CBA Team	NBA Affiliations	Reference
Albany Patroons	New York Knicks, Portland Trail Blazers	
Cedar Rapids Silver Bullets	Indiana Pacers, Utah Jazz	
Columbus Horizon	Houston Rockets, Boston Celtics	
Grand Rapids Hoops	Detroit Pistons, Phoenix Suns	
La Crosse Catbirds	Milwaukee Bucks, Sacramento Kings	
Omaha Racers	Cleveland Cavaliers, New Jersey Nets	
Pensacola Tornados	Cleveland Cavaliers, New Jersey Nets	
Quad City Thunder	Charlotte Hornets, Seattle SuperSonics	
Rapid City Thrillers	Miami Heat, Portland Trail Blazers	
Rockford Lightning	Chicago Bulls, Seattle SuperSonics	
San Jose Jammers	Golden State Warriors, Sacramento Kings	
Santa Barbara Islanders	Los Angeles Clippers, Los Angeles Lakers	
Sioux Falls Skyforce	Minnesota Timberwolves, Washington Bullets	
Topeka Sizzlers	Atlanta Hawks, Philadelphia 76ers	
Tulsa Fast Breakers	San Antonio Spurs, New Jersey Nets	
Wichita Falls Texans	Dallas Mavericks, Boston Celtics	

== 1990–91 season ==
Teams

- Albany Patroons
- Cedar Rapids Silver Bullets
- Columbus Horizon
- Grand Rapids Hoops
- La Crosse Catbirds
- Oklahoma City Cavalry
- Omaha Racers
- Pensacola Tornados
- Quad City Thunder
- Rapid City Thrillers
- Rockford Lightning
- San Jose Jammers
- Sioux Falls Skyforce
- Tulsa Fast Breakers
- Wichita Falls Texans
- Yakima Sun Kings

Regular season standings

Team	W	L	PCT	QW	Points
Central Division
Quad City Thunder	32	24	.571	120.5	216.5
La Crosse Catbirds	32	24	.571	111	207
Rockford Lightning	23	33	.411	114	183
Cedar Rapids Silver Bullets	24	32	.429	106	178
Midwest Division
Omaha Racers	39	17	.696	127	244
Rapid City Thrillers	27	29	.482	115.5	196.5
Sioux Falls Skyforce	26	30	.464	100	178
Yakima Sun Kings	15	41	.268	90.5	135.5
Western Division
Tulsa Fast Breakers	34	22	.607	124	226
Wichita Falls Texans	32	24	.571	125.5	221.5
San Jose Jammers	21	35	.375	93	156
Oklahoma City Cavalry	18	38	.321	95.5	149.5
Eastern Division
Albany Patroons	50	6	.893	139	289
Grand Rapids Hoops	25	31	.446	116.5	191.5
Pensacola Tornados	27	29	.482	108	189
Columbus Horizon	23	33	.411	106	175

League map
Locations of CBA teams during the 1990–91 season

== 1991–92 season ==
Teams

- Albany Patroons
- Bakersfield Jammers (disbanded midseason)
- Birmingham Bandits
- Columbus Horizon
- Fort Wayne Fury
- Grand Rapids Hoops
- La Crosse Catbirds
- Oklahoma City Cavalry
- Omaha Racers
- Quad City Thunder
- Rapid City Thrillers
- Rockford Lightning
- Sioux Falls Skyforce
- Tri-City Chinook
- Tulsa Zone
- Wichita Falls Texans
- Yakima Sun Kings

Regular season standings

Team	W	L	PCT	QW	Points
Eastern Division
Grand Rapids Hoops	28	28	.500	110.5	194.5
Birmingham Bandits	25	31	.446	114.5	189.5
Albany Patroons	24	32	.429	109	181
Columbus Horizon	18	38	.321	88	142
Midwest Division
Quad City Thunder	42	14	.750	136.5	262.5
La Crosse Catbirds	40	16	.714	140	260
Rockford Lightning	21	35	.375	98	161
Fort Wayne Fury	21	35	.375	87	150
Northern Division
Rapid City Thrillers	37	19	.661	130	241
Omaha Racers	37	19	.661	127	238
Tri-City Chinook	29	27	.518	112	199
Sioux Falls Skyforce	24	32	.429	104	176
Yakima Sun Kings	13	43	.232	82.5	121.5
Southern Division
Oklahoma City Cavalry	33	23	.589	114.5	213.5
Wichita Falls Texans	28	28	.500	126.5	210.5
Tulsa Zone	24	32	.429	108	180
Bakersfield Jammers^{§}	16	8	.667	52	100

^{§} The Bakersfield Jammers disbanded midseason

League map
Locations of CBA teams during the 1991–92 season
Eastern Division teams — Midwest Division teams — Northern Division teams — Southern Division teams

NBA affiliates

CBA Team	NBA Affiliations	Reference
Albany Patroons	New York Knicks, Phoenix Suns (M–Z)	
Bakersfield Jammers	Golden State Warriors, Los Angeles Lakers (A–L)	
Birmingham Bandits	Atlanta Hawks, San Antonio Spurs (A–L)	
Columbus Horizon	Cleveland Cavaliers, Los Angeles Lakers (M–Z)	
Fort Wayne Fury	Indiana Pacers, Philadelphia 76ers (M–Z)	
Grand Rapids Hoops	Detroit Pistons, Phoenix Suns (A–L)	
La Crosse Catbirds	Milwaukee Bucks, Washington Bullets (A–L)	
Oklahoma City Cavalry	Boston Celtics, Houston Rockets	
Omaha Racers	Sacramento Kings, Utah Jazz (A–L)	
Quad City Thunder	Charlotte Hornets, Philadelphia 76ers (A–L)	
Rapid City Thrillers	Miami Heat, Los Angeles Clippers (A–L)	
Rockford Lightning	Chicago Bulls, Utah Jazz (M–Z)	
Sioux Falls Skyforce	Minnesota Timberwolves, Los Angeles Lakers (M–Z)	
Tri–City Chinook	Denver Nuggets, Orlando Magic	
Tulsa Zone	New Jersey Nets, Washington Bullets (M–Z)	
Wichita Falls Texans	Dallas Mavericks, San Antonio Spurs (M–Z)	
Yakima Sun Kings	Portland Trail Blazers, Seattle SuperSonics	

== 1992–93 season ==
Teams

- Capital Region Pontiacs
- Columbus Horizon
- Fargo-Moorhead Fever
- Fort Wayne Fury
- Grand Rapids Hoops
- La Crosse Catbirds
- Oklahoma City Cavalry
- Omaha Racers
- Quad City Thunder
- Rapid City Thrillers
- Rochester Renegade
- Rockford Lightning
- Sioux Falls Skyforce
- Tri-City Chinook
- Wichita Falls Texans
- Yakima Sun Kings

Regular season standings

Team	W	L	PCT	QW	Points
Eastern Division
Grand Rapids Hoops	35	21	.625	125	230
Capital Region Pontiacs	28	28	.500	113	197
Columbus Horizon	21	35	.375	96	159
Fort Wayne Fury	20	36	.357	98.5	158.5
Mideast Division
Rockford Lightning	44	12	.786	138	270
Quad City Thunder	38	18	.679	130.5	244.5
La Crosse Catbirds	32	24	.571	123	219
Rochester Renegade	6	50	.107	77	95
Midwest Division
Rapid City Thrillers	44	12	.786	134	266
Omaha Racers	28	28	.500	109	193
Sioux Falls Skyforce	26	30	.464	110.5	188.5
Fargo-Moorhead Fever	18	38	.321	95	149
Western Division
Wichita Falls Texans	34	22	.607	115	217
Tri-City Chinook	27	29	.482	112	193
Oklahoma City Cavalry	25	31	.446	112.5	187.5
Yakima Sun Kings	22	34	.392	103	169

== 1993–94 season ==
Teams

- Columbus Horizon
- Fargo-Moorhead Fever
- Fort Wayne Fury
- Grand Rapids Hoops
- Hartford Hellcats
- La Crosse Catbirds
- Oklahoma City Cavalry
- Omaha Racers
- Quad City Thunder
- Rapid City Thrillers
- Rochester Renegade
- Rockford Lightning
- Sioux Falls Skyforce
- Tri-City Chinook
- Wichita Falls Texans
- Yakima Sun Kings

Regular season standings

Team	W	L	PCT	QW	Points
Eastern Division
Grand Rapids Hoops	37	19	.661	119	230
Fort Wayne Fury	19	37	.339	104.5	161.5
Hartford Hellcats	18	38	.321	100	154
Columbus Horizon	18	38	.321	99.5	153.5
Mideast Division
La Crosse Catbirds	35	21	.625	118	223
Rockford Lightning	32	24	.571	122	218
Quad City Thunder	34	22	.607	114.5	216.5
Rochester Renegades	31	25	.554	112	205
Midwest Division
Rapid City Thrillers	37	19	.661	125.5	236.5
Omaha Racers	30	26	.536	113.5	203.5
Quad City Thunder	34	22	.607	114.5	216.5
Fargo-Moorhead Fever	25	31	.446	104	179
Western Division
Tri-City Chinook	34	22	.607	116.5	218.5
Wichita Falls Texans	26	30	.464	118	196
Yakima Sun Kings	24	32	.429	112	184
Oklahoma City Cavalry	24	32	.429	105.5	177.5

== 1994–95 season ==
Teams

- Chicago Rockers
- Fort Wayne Fury
- Grand Rapids Mackers
- Harrisburg Hammerheads (disbanded midseason)
- Mexico City Aztecas
- Oklahoma City Cavalry
- Omaha Racers
- Pittsburgh Piranhas
- Quad City Thunder
- Rapid City Thrillers
- Rockford Lightning
- Shreveport Crawdads
- Sioux Falls Skyforce
- Tri-City Chinook
- Yakima Sun Kings

Regular season standings

Team	W	L	PCT	QW	Points
Eastern Division
Pittsburgh Piranhas	27	29	.482	119	200
Fort Wayne Fury	24	32	.429	99.5	171.5
Harrisburg Hammerheads^{§}	15	18	.455	63	108
Hartford Hellcats^{♯}	11	23	.324	57.5	90.5
Midwest Division
Quad City Thunder	33	23	.589	116.5	215.5
Rockford Lightning	29	27	.518	121	208
Chicago Rockers	28	28	.500	118	202
Grand Rapids Mackers	29	27	.518	114	201
Western Division
Yakima Sun Kings	36	20	.643	130.5	238.5
Sioux Falls Skyforce	34	22	.607	131	233
Tri-City Chinook	32	34	.571	127.5	223.5
Rapid City Thrillers	31	25	.554	119.5	212.5
Southern Division
Oklahoma City Cavalry	35	21	.625	106	211
Omaha Racers	26	30	.464	97.5	175.5
Mexico Aztecas	19	37	.339	100.5	157.5
Shreveport Crawdads	17	39	.304	82	133

^{§} Harrisburg Hammerheads disbanded midseason
^{♯} Hartford Hellcats disbanded midseason

== 1995–96 season ==
Teams

- Chicago Rockers
- Connecticut Pride
- Florida Beachdogs
- Fort Wayne Fury
- Grand Rapids Mackers
- Oklahoma City Cavalry
- Omaha Racers
- Quad City Thunder
- Rockford Lightning
- San Diego Wildcards (disbanded midseason)
- Shreveport Storm
- Sioux Falls Skyforce
- Yakima Sun Kings

Regular season standings

Team	W	L	PCT	QW	Points
Eastern Division
Grand Rapids Mackers	33	23	.589	110.5	209.5
Fort Wayne Fury	25	31	.446	113	188
Connecticut Pride	17	39	.304	96	147
Midwest Division
Rockford Lightning	35	21	.625	122	227
Quad City Thunder	37	19	.661	116	227
Chicago Rockers	26	30	.464	109	187
Western Division
Sioux Falls Skyforce	34	24	.607	127	223
Omaha Racers	28	28	.500	106.5	190.5
Yakima Sun Kings	19	37	.339	104.5	161.5
Southern Division
Florida Beach Dogs	41	15	.732	131.5	254.5
Oklahoma City Cavalry	34	22	.607	121.5	223.5
Shreveport Storm	17	39	.304	99	150
San Diego Wildcards^{§}	4	17	.190	34.5	46.5

^{§} San Diego Wildcards folded during the season

== 1996–97 season ==
Teams

- Connecticut Pride
- Florida Beachdogs
- Fort Wayne Fury
- Grand Rapids Hoops
- La Crosse Bobcats
- Oklahoma City Cavalry
- Omaha Racers
- Quad City Thunder
- Rockford Lightning
- Sioux Falls Skyforce
- Yakima Sun Kings

Regular season standings

Team	W	L	PCT	QW	Points
American Conference
Florida Beachdogs	38	18	.679	137.5	251.5
Grand Rapids Hoops	32	24	.571	124.5	220.5
Quad City Thunder	27	29	.482	110	191
Rockford Lightning	28	28	.500	105	189
Connecticut Pride	21	35	.375	107.5	170.5
Fort Wayne Fury	20	36	.357	93	153
National Conference
Sioux Falls Skyforce	47	9	.839	134	275
Oklahoma City Cavalry	29	27	.518	120	207
Yakima Suns Kings	25	31	.446	103	178
Omaha Racers	22	34	.393	97.5	163.5
La Crosse Bobcats	19	37	.339	100	157

== 1997–98 season ==
Teams

- Connecticut Pride
- Fort Wayne Fury
- Grand Rapids Hoops
- Idaho Stampede
- La Crosse Bobcats
- Quad City Thunder
- Rockford Lightning
- Sioux Falls Skyforce
- Yakima Sun Kings

Regular season standings

Team	W	L	PCT	QW	Points
American Conference
Fort Wayne Fury	31	25	.554	117.0	210.0
Rockford Lightning	29	27	.518	114.0	201.0
Connecticut Pride	26	30	.464	113.0	190.0
Grand Rapids Hoops	21	35	.375	101.5	164.5
National Conference
Quad City Thunder	28	18	.679	130.0	244.0
Sioux Falls Skyforce	31	25	.554	114.5	207.5
Yakima Sun Kings	26	30	.464	110.0	188.8
Idaho Stampede	25	31	.446	110.0	185.0
La Crosse Bobcats	25	31	.446	98.0	170.0

League map
Locations of CBA teams during the 1997–98 season

== 1998–99 season ==
Teams

- Connecticut Pride
- Fort Wayne Fury
- Grand Rapids Hoops
- Idaho Stampede
- La Crosse Bobcats
- Quad City Thunder
- Rockford Lightning
- Sioux Falls Skyforce
- Yakima Sun Kings

Regular season standings

Team	W	L	PCT	QW	Points
American Conference
Connecticut Pride	37	19	.661	124.5	235.5
Grand Rapids Hoops	27	29	.482	121	202
Fort Wayne Fury	28	28	.500	103.5	187.5
Rockford Lightning	23	33	.411	103.5	172.5
National Conference
Sioux Falls Skyforce	32	24	.571	128.5	224.5
Yakima Sun Kings	30	26	.536	122.5	212.5
Quad City Thunder	29	27	.518	100	187
Idaho Stampede	25	31	.446	104	179
La Crosse Bobcats	21	35	.375	100.5	163.5

== 1999–2000 season ==
Teams

- Connecticut Pride
- Fort Wayne Fury
- Grand Rapids Hoops
- Idaho Stampede
- La Crosse Bobcats
- Quad City Thunder
- Rockford Lightning
- Sioux Falls Skyforce
- St. Charles Hawks (never played in the CBA, joined the IBL as the St. Louis Swarm)
- Trenton Shooting Stars (never played in the CBA, joined the IBL)
- Yakima Sun Kings

Regular season standings

Team	W	L	PCT
American Conference
Rockford Lightning	30	26	.536
Connecticut Pride	29	27	.518
Grand Rapids Hoops	29	27	.518
Fort Wayne Fury	26	30	.464
National Conference
Quad City Thunder	35	21	.625
Yakima Sun Kings	33	23	.589
Sioux Falls Skyforce	30	26	.536
La Crosse Bobcats	21	35	.375
Idaho Stampede	19	37	.339

== 2000–01 season ==
Teams

- Connecticut Pride
- Fort Wayne Fury
- Gary Steelheads
- Grand Rapids Hoops
- Idaho Stampede
- La Crosse Bobcats
- Quad City Thunder
- Rockford Lightning
- Sioux Falls Skyforce
- Yakima Sun Kings

Regular season standings

Team	W	L	PCT	QW	Points
American Conference
Connecticut Pride	16	9	.640	55	103
Grand Rapids Hoops	15	10	.600	55	100
Fort Wayne Fury	11	9	.550	41.0	74
Rockford Lightning	12	13	.480	49.0	85
Gary Steelheads	9	15	.375	37.5	64.5
National Conference
Idaho Stampede	17	7	.708	49	100
Yakima Sun Kings	12	12	.500	55.5	91.5
Quad City Thunder	8	13	.381	42	66
La Crosse Bobcats	9	14	.391	41.5	68.5
Sioux Falls Skyforce	8	15	.348	42.5	66.5

== 2001–02 season ==
Teams

- Dakota Wizards
- Fargo-Moorhead Beez
- Flint Fuze
- Gary Steelheads
- Grand Rapids Hoops
- Rockford Lightning
- Saskatchewan Hawks
- Sioux Falls Skyforce

Regular season standings

Team	W	L	PCT	QW	Points
American Conference
Rockford Lightning	31	25	.554	120.5	213.5
Sioux Falls Skyforce	33	23	.589	114.5	213.5
Grand Rapids Hoops	30	26	.536	114.0	204
Gary Steelheads	22	34	.393	37.5	166.0
National Conference
Dakota Wizards	26	14	.650	95	173
Fargo-Moorhead Beez	25	15	.625	80.5	155.5
Flint Fuze	17	23	.404	77.5	128.5
Saskatchewan Hawks	8	32	.200	66.0	90

League map
Locations of CBA teams during the 2001–02 season

== 2002–03 season ==
Teams

- Dakota Wizards
- Gary Steelheads
- Great Lakes Storm
- Grand Rapids Hoops
- Idaho Stampede
- Rockford Lightning
- Sioux Falls Skyforce
- Yakima Sun Kings

Regular season standings

Team	W	L	PCT	QW	Points
American Conference
Rockford Lightning	32	16	.667	112.5	208.5
Grand Rapids Hoops	23	25	.479	100.5	169.5
Gary Steelheads	25	23	.521	93.5	168.5
Great Lakes Storm	19	29	.396	80.5	137.5
National Conference
Dakota Wizards	31	17	.646	119.5	212.5
Yakima Sun Kings	28	20	.583	104.5	188.5
Idaho Stampede	17	31	.354	87.5	138.5
Sioux Falls Skyforce	17	31	.354	69.5	120.5

League map
Locations of CBA teams during the 2002–03 season

== 2003–04 season ==
Teams

- Dakota Wizards
- Gary Steelheads
- Great Lakes Storm
- Idaho Stampede
- Rockford Lightning
- Sioux Falls Skyforce
- Yakima Sun Kings

Regular season standings

Team	W	L	PCT	QW	Points
Dakota Wizards	34	14	.708	114.0	216
Idaho Stampede	34	14	.708	103.5	205.5
Gary Steelheads	27	21	.563	96.0	177
Rockford Lightning	25	23	.521	96.5	171.5
Sioux Falls Skyforce	23	25	.479	100.5	169.5
Great Lakes Storm	15	33	.313	83	128
Yakima Sun Kings	10	38	.208	78.5	108.5

== 2004–05 season ==
Teams

- Dakota Wizards
- Gary Steelheads
- Great Lakes Storm
- Idaho Stampede
- Michigan Mayhem
- Rockford Lightning
- Sioux Falls Skyforce
- Yakima Sun Kings

Regular season standings

Team	W	L	PCT	QW	Points
Eastern Conference
Great Lakes Storm	28	20	.583	105.5	189.5
Rockford Lightning	26	22	.542	100.5	178.5
Michigan Mayhem	18	30	.375	81.5	135.5
Gary Steelheads	17	31	.354	84.5	135.5
Western Conference
Dakota Wizards	32	16	.667	101.5	197.5
Sioux Falls Skyforce	31	17	.646	101	194
Idaho Stampede	23	25	.479	99	168
Yakima Sun Kings	17	31	.354	94.5	145.5

League map
Locations of CBA teams during the 2004–05 season

== 2005–06 season ==
Teams

- Albany Patroons
- Dakota Wizards
- Gary Steelheads
- Idaho Stampede
- Michigan Mayhem
- Rockford Lightning
- Sioux Falls Skyforce
- Yakima Sun Kings

Regular season standings

Team	W	L	PCT	QW	Points
Eastern Conference
Gary Steelheads	29	19	.604	110	197
Rockford Lightning	30	18	.625	102	192
Albany Patroons	20	28	.417	89	149
Michigan Mayhem	8	40	.167	111.5	135.5
Western Conference
Yakima Sun Kings	31	17	.646	102.5	195.5
Sioux Falls Skyforce	30	18	.625	104	194
Idaho Stampede	25	23	.521	101.5	176.5
Dakota Wizards	19	29	.396	88	145

== 2006–07 season ==
Teams

- Albany Patroons
- Butte Daredevils
- Great Falls Explorers
- Indiana Alley Cats
- Minot Skyrockets
- Pittsburgh Xplosion
- Utah Eagles
- Vancouver Dragons (left league midseason)
- Yakama Sun Kings

Regular season standings

Team	W	L	PCT	QW	Points
American Division
Albany Patroons	30	18	.625	107	197
Minot SkyRockets	31	17	.646	103	195
Indiana Alley Cats	23	25	.479	94	163
Pittsburgh Xplosion	10	38	.208	81	108
National Division
Yakama Sun Kings	35	13	.729	125	230
Great Falls Explorers	24	24	.500	90	162
Butte Daredevils	21	27	.438	87	150
Utah Eagles	6	18	.250	35	53

League map
Locations of CBA teams during the 2006–07 season

== 2007–08 season ==
Teams

- Albany Patroons
- Atlanta Krunk
- Butte Daredevils
- East Kentucky Miners
- Great Falls Explorers
- Minot Skyrockets
- Oklahoma Cavalry
- Pittsburgh Xplosion
- Rio Grande Valley Silverados
- Yakama Sun Kings

Regular season standings

Team	W	L	PCT	QW	Points
American Conference
Minot Skyrockets	38	10	.792	124.5	238.5
Pittsburgh Xplosion	29	19	.604	115.5	202.5
East Kentucky Miners	26	22	.542	105.5	178.5
Albany Patroons	21	27	.438	89	152
Atlanta Krunk	10	41	.196	51.5	81.5
National Conference
Yakama Sun Kings	43	5	.896	135	264
Oklahoma Cavalry	30	18	.625	116.5	206.5
Butte Daredevils	17	31	.354	86.5	137.5
Great Falls Explorers	13	32	.289	57.5	96.5
Rio Grande Silverados	13	35	.271	83.5	122.5

League map
Locations of CBA teams during the 2007–08 season
American Conference teams — National Conference teams

== 2008–09 season ==
Teams

- Albany Patroons
- East Kentucky Miners
- Lawton-Fort Sill Cavalry
- Minot Skyrockets

Regular season standings

Team	W	L	PCT	PF	PA
Lawton-Fort Sill Cavalry	12	2	.857	1311	1164
Albany Patroons	13	7	.650	1581	1489
East Kentucky Miners	7	7	.500	765	865
Minot Skyrockets	6	9	.400	756	895

League map
Locations of CBA teams during the 2008–09 season

== CBA franchise timeline ==
Italics denote a team that was re-located or re-branded; Bold denotes a team that played in the last full CBA season

- Albany Patroons (1982–1992) → Capital Region Pontiacs (1992–93) → Hartford Hellcats (1993–94) → Connecticut Pride (1994–2000)
- **Albany Patroons** (2005–09)
- Alberta Dusters (1980–82) → Las Vegas Silvers (1982) → Albuquerque Silvers (1982–85)
- Allentown Jets (1978–79) → Lehigh Valley Jets (1979–1981)
- Anchorage Northern Knights (1978–1983)
- Atlanta Krunk (2007–08)
- Baltimore Metros (1978–79) → Mohawk Valley Thunderbirds (1979) → Utica Olympics (1979–1980) → Atlantic City Hi-Rollers (1980–83)
- Butte Daredevils (2006–08)
- Dakota Wizards (2001–06)
- Detroit Spirits (1982–86) → Savannah Spirits (1986–88) → Tulsa Fast Breakers (1988–1991) → Tulsa Zone (1991–92) → Fargo-Moorhead Fever (1992–94) → Mexico City Aztecas (1994–95) → San Diego Wildcards (1995)
- **East Kentucky Miners** (2007–09)
- Evansville Thunder (1984–86)
- Fargo-Moorhead Beez (2001–02)
- Flint Fuze (2001–02) → Great Lakes Storm (2002–05)
- Fort Wayne Fury (1991–2001)
- Gary Steelheads (2000–06)
- Grand Rapids Hoops (1989–1994) → Grand Rapids Mackers (1994–96) → Grand Rapids Hoops (1996–2003)
- Great Falls Explorers (2006–08)
- Hawaii Volcanos (1979–1980) → Billings Volcanos (1980–84)
- Idaho Stampede (1997–2006)
- Indiana Alley Cats (2006–07)
- Jersey Shore Bullets (1978–79)
- Kansas City Sizzlers (1985–86) → Topeka Sizzlers (1986–1990) → Yakima Sun Kings (1990–2008)
- Lancaster Red Roses (1978–1980) → Philadelphia Kings (1980–81) → Lancaster Lightning (1981–85) → Baltimore Lightning (1985–86) → Rockford Lightning (1986–2006)
- Louisville Catbirds (1983–85) → La Crosse Catbirds (1985–1994) → Pittsburgh Piranhas (1994–95)
- Maine Lumberjacks (1978–1983) → Bay State Bombardiers (1983–86) → Pensacola Tornados (1986–91) → Birmingham Bandits (1991–92) → Rochester Renegade (1992–94) → Harrisburg Hammerheads (1994–95)
- Michigan Mayhem (2004–06)
- **Minot SkyRockets** (2006–2009)
- Montana Golden Nuggets (1980–83) → Puerto Rico Coquis (1983–85) → Maine Windjammers (1985–86)
- Ohio Mixers (1982–84) → Cincinnati Slammers (1984–87) → Cedar Rapids Silver Bullets (1988–1991) → Tri-City Chinook (1991–95)
- Oklahoma Cavalry (2007–08) → **Lawton-Fort Sill Cavalry** (2008–09)
- Oklahoma City Cavalry (1990–97)
- Pittsburgh Xplosion (2006–08)
- Quad City Thunder (1987–2001)
- Reno Bighorns (1982–83)
- Rio Grande Valley Silverados (2007–08)
- Rochester Zeniths (1978–1984)
- **Rockford Lightning** (2007–09)
- San Jose Jammers (1989–1991) → Bakersfield Jammers (1991–92)
- Santa Barbara Islanders (1989–1990)
- Sarasota Stingers (1983–85) → Florida Stingers (1985–86) → Charleston Gunners (1986–89) → Columbus Horizon (1989–1994) → Shreveport Crawdads (1994–95) → Shreveport Storm (1995–96)
- Sioux Falls Sky Force (1989–2000, 2001–06)
- Saskatchewan Hawks (2001–02)
- Tampa Bay Thrillers (1984–86) → Rapid City Thrillers (1986–1995) → Florida Beachdogs (1995–97)
- Toronto Tornados (1983–85) → Pensacola Tornados (1985–86) → Jacksonville Jets (1986) → Mississippi Jets (1986–87) → Wichita Falls Texans (1988–1994) → Chicago Rockers (1994–96) → LaCrosse Bobcats (1996–2001)
- Utah Eagles (2006–07)
- Wilkes-Barre Barons (1978–79) → Pennsylvania Barons (1979–1980) → Scranton Aces (1980–81)
- Wisconsin Flyers (1982–87) → Rochester Flyers (1987–89) → Omaha Racers (1989–1998)
- Wyoming Wildcatters (1982–88)

== See also ==
- List of Continental Basketball Association All-Star Games
- List of Continental Basketball Association champions
- List of Continental Basketball Association award winners and successful alumni
- List of developmental and minor sports leagues
