= Columbus Horizon =

- League: Continental Basketball Association
- Founded: 1983
- Folded: 1996
- History: Sarasota Stingers; 1983–85; Florida Stingers; 1985–86; Charleston Gunners; 1986–89; Columbus Horizon; 1989–1994; Shreveport Crawdads; 1994-95; Shreveport Storm; 1995-1996
- Arena: Ohio Expo Center Coliseum, Battelle Hall
- Location: Columbus, Ohio
- Team colors: red, yellow, black
- Ownership: Eli Jacobson
- Championships: 0
Home	Away

The Columbus Horizon is a defunct basketball team from Columbus, Ohio that played for five seasons in the Continental Basketball Association (CBA) from 1989 to 1994.

The team began as the Sarasota Stingers, located in Sarasota, Florida from 1983 until 1986. The last season the team was known as the Florida Stingers, before departing to be named the Charleston Gunners after moving to Charleston, West Virginia from 1986 until 1989. After which, the team formally became the Columbus Horizon, before becoming the Shreveport Crawdads after relocating to Shreveport, Louisiana in 1994. It was renamed the Shreveport Storm the next year and final season before folding.

== History ==
Plans to bring professional basketball to Columbus were unveiled in September 1988 and the Horizon began playing in November 1989 at the Ohio Expo Center Coliseum, where the franchise had a five-year lease. Owner Eli Jacobson had previously owned the Pensacola Tornados and was able attract Pensacola veterans Gary Youmans and Tim Sise to Columbus as coach and General Manager respectively. Jacobsen was also a member of the league's Expansion and Rules Committees. Jacobsen told the press conference that the Horizon would become involved in the Central Ohio community and said the economic impact on Columbus would be to the tune $3–$4 million generated back into the city each year. CBA Commissioner Jay Ramsdell said Columbus had all the elements to be a winning CBA franchise. Despite the team bearing the name Columbus, team officials said they wanted the franchise to become a hometown favorite throughout the entire Central Ohio area. The Houston Rockets agreed to be the club's NBA affiliate.

=== Death of Jay Ramsdell ===
Jay Ramsdell was on his way from the CBA league office in Denver, Colorado to Columbus for the 1989 College Player Draft when his United Airlines Flight 232 plane crashed in Sioux City, Iowa on July 19, 1989. A close friend of Eli Jacobsen, he was instrumental in laying the groundwork which eventually led to the granting of a CBA franchise for Columbus.

=== The first season (1989–1990) ===
The first logo of the Columbus Horizon that was used from 1989 to 1991.

The Horizon was placed in the four-team National Conference Eastern Division by the CBA. Veteran CBA coach Gary Youmans was put in charge. Youmans, who previously coached the Cedar Rapids Silver Bullets and was general manager of the Tampa Bay Thrillers, was an Ashland College graduate. Tim Sise, who had worked with Youmans as part of the Pensacola Tornados franchise, was appointed General Manager.

In preparing for their inaugural season, the Horizon looked to secure the services of a local college hoops star by making them their first round draft pick.

Jay Burson, who at that time was the leading scorer in Ohio high school history, had suffered a fractured cervical vertebra in a collision with an Iowa player while playing for Ohio State. Despite being drafted by the Horizon, Burson signed a three-year contract with the Houston Rockets of the NBA saying he would not play for Columbus. However, after being released by Houston and clearing waivers in October 1989, he decided to sign with the Horizon. Burson wasn't signed just to sell tickets, Horizon coach Gary Youmans said. "We want Jay as a player, not as a drawing card. He might attract some fans but we want him so we can win ballgames." In 34 games with the Horizon in the 1989–90 season, Burson averaged 13.6 points a game.

Also among the team's first signings was another local college product Eric Newsome, a 5-foot-8 guard from Toledo, who was, at that time, second on Miami University's career scoring list.

The new team's first game came at home to Santa Barbara on November 14, 1989. Columbus lost 123–113 in what was both their and Santa Barabara's CBA debut. The remainder of the season proved difficult for the fledgling franchise.

In January 1990, the Horizon were forced to change coaches after Gary Youmans resigned due to ill health. He was replaced by Bill Klucas, a former newspaper sports editor turned basketball coach. Klucas was unable to change the fortunes of the new team, which finished fourth out of four teams in its division with a record of 18 wins and 38 defeats.

=== Later seasons (1990–93) ===
The Horizon spent just four more years in the CBA, finishing in last place in three of those seasons. In 1990-91 the Horizon finished bottom of the National Conference Eastern Division with a 23–33 record. In both 1991 and 1992, Horizon players won the CBA Long Distance Shootout. Barry Stevens won in 91 and Duane Washington a year later.

Vince Chickerella, winner of more than 400 games in a lengthy career at Linden McKinley, DeSales and Hilliard high schools in Central Ohio, was named as the new head coach in April 1991. Chickerella was chosen from a field of more than 100 applicants, which included seven NBA assistants, several CBA head coaches and many NCAA Division I assistants. In his first season, the Horizon, now a member of the American Conference Eastern Division, won just 18 times in a 56-game season and again finished dead last. The Horizon had selected Kermit Holmes of Oklahoma as its first round draft pick in 1991. Chickerella resigned in January 1992 and was replaced by Fred Bryan, a former coach and general manager of the Pensacola Tornados.

Before the 92–93 season began, however, former Michigan All-American Cazzie Russell, who had coached for seven seasons in the CBA, was signed as coach. The team moved downtown to Battelle Hall and improved slightly to lift itself off the foot of the division, but still finished 92–93 with a losing record of 21–35. Their record was only marginally better than the 20-36 Fort Wayne Fury. In 1993 Mitchell Butler from UCLA was selected as Columbus' first round draft pick, but the 6' 5" shooting guard instead chose to sign undrafted with the Washington Bullets of the NBA. The Horizon slumped back into last place by the 1993–94 season, again managing just 18 wins.

Twice in the franchise's history did a player score 50 or more points in a single game. Steve Harris scored 54 against the LaCrosse Catbirds on January 7, 1990, while Kevin Williams scored 50 in a home game against the Pensacola Tornados just weeks later on February 28, 1990. Ricky Calloway, who helped Indiana win the national championship in 1987, was suspended by the Horizon because he failed two CBA drug tests.

=== Demise (1993–94) ===
Facing weak business support and the lowest average attendance per game in the entire CBA, the Horizon announced in March 1994 that it would leave town. The Horizon had averaged 2,600 fans in its first two seasons, 2,900 in its third season but had dropped to 1,700 by 1993–94. It was also reported that the franchise had lost $2.5 million in Columbus and had a debt of about $1 million. The franchise departed Columbus and moved to Shreveport, Louisiana for the 1994–95 season.

== Season-by-season record ==
Year	League	Reg. season	Playoffs	Won	Lost
1989–90	National Conference	4th, Eastern	Did not qualify	18	38
1990–91	National Conference	4th, Eastern	Did not qualify	23	33
1991–92	American Conference	4th, Eastern	Did not qualify	18	38
1992–93	American Conference	3rd, Eastern	Did not qualify	21	35
1993–94	American Conference	4th, Eastern	Did not qualify	18	38

== TV and radio coverage ==
In their first season of play, the Horizon had a number of their games on television throughout the Central Ohio area. The games featured play-by-play commentary by Mike Gleason a former letterman and graduate of Central Michigan University. Joining Gleason to handle color commentary was Columbus-born former NBA and ABA player Larry Jones. All games, both home and away, were carried on radio on WCOL AM with play-by-play duties handled by veteran broadcaster Bob Fitzgerald. Home games were televised live on WCLS-TV 62, whose studios were also located in the Ohio Center, two floors below Battelle Hall. The WCLS-TV coverage, was led by play-by-play man Mike Raymond and former Horizon and Ohio State standout Ron Stokes. In December 1992, Raymond left WCLS-TV and their Horizon coverage. The team made history when Raymond's replacement, Rob Havener became the youngest play-by-play man in league history. Havener, who replaced Raymond as WCLS Sports Director was three weeks shy of his 20th birthday when he made his Horizon debut. He did two games with Stokes before Stokes left WCLS. Stokes was replaced by Terry Brown who teamed with Havener on the Horizon telecasts for the remainder of the 1992–93 season.

== All-time roster ==
- George Ackles
- Paul Afeaki
- Alex Austin
- Scott Bailey
- Mark Baker
- Louis Banks
- Dondi Bell
- Fred Benjamin
- David Blackwell
- James Bradley
- Darron Brittman
- Jamaal Brown
- T. Tony Brown
- Luther Burks
- Jay Burson
- David Butler
- Demetrius Calip
- Ricky Calloway
- Ron Cavenall
- Chris Childs
- Johnny Clark
- Reggie Cross
- John Devereaux
- Byron Dinkins
- LeRon Ellis
- Tony Farmer
- Lewis Geter
- Mike Goodson
- Jens-Uwe Gordon
- Michael Graham
- Orlando Graham
- Ken Green
- Kerry Hammonds
- Jerome Harmon
- Leonard Harris
- Steve Harris
- Jerome Henderson
- Darren Henrie
- Richard Hollis
- Kermit Holmes
- Patrick Holt
- Ed Horton
- Byron Irvin
- Chris Jent
- Adonis Jordan
- Tony Karasek
- Jeff King
- Jim Lampley
- Clifford Lett
- Ralph Lewis
- Ed Lover
- Brian Martin
- Vada Martin
- Grady Mateen
- Shawn McDaniel
- John McIntyre
- Jared Miller
- Dwight Moody
- Tracy Moore
- Perry Moss
- Eric Mudd
- Craig Neal
- Martin Nessley
- Eric Newsome
- Alan Ogg
- Jeremy Price
- Kelvin Ransey
- Omar Roland
- Ronald Rutland
- Tom Schafer
- Michael Sims
- McKinley Singleton
- Andre Spencer
- John Spencer
- Ron Spivey
- Greg Spurling
- Kevin Spurling
- Barry Stevens
- Marvin Stevens
- Ron Stokes
- Justus Thigpen
- Charles Thomas
- Sedric Toney
- Keith Tower
- Sean Tyson
- Kelvin Upshaw
- Mark Wade
- Duane Washington
- Kennard Winchester
- Joe Wylie

== Past coaches ==
- Gary Youmans
- Bill Klucas
- Vincent Chickerella
- Fred Bryan
- Cazzie Russell

== See also ==
- Continental Basketball Association
- Continental Basketball Association franchise history
- List of Continental Basketball Association Champions
- List of Continental Basketball Association MVPs and notable alumni
