= Chris Childs (basketball) =

American basketball player

Personal information
- Born: November 20, 1967 (age 58) Bakersfield, California, U.S.
- Listed height: 6 ft 3 in (1.91 m)
- Listed weight: 195 lb (88 kg)

Career information
- High school: Foothill (Bakersfield, California)
- College: Boise State (1985–1989)
- NBA draft: 1989: undrafted
- Playing career: 1989–2003
- Position: Point guard
- Number: 1, 11

Career history
- 1989–1990: Rapid City Thrillers
- 1990–1991: Columbus Horizon
- 1991–1992: Bakersfield Jammers
- 1992–1994: Quad City Thunder
- 1994–1996: New Jersey Nets
- 1996–2001: New York Knicks
- 2001–2002: Toronto Raptors
- 2002–2003: New Jersey Nets

Career highlights
- CBA champion (1994); CBA Playoff/Finals MVP (1994); Big Sky Player of the Year (1989); 3× First-team All-Big Sky (1987–1989)

Career NBA statistics
- Points: 3,710 (6.9 ppg)
- Rebounds: 1,308 (2.4 rpg)
- Assists: 2,633 (4.9 apg)
- Stats at NBA.com
- Stats at Basketball Reference

Chris Childs (born November 20, 1967) is an American former professional basketball player, who played primarily at the guard position.

== Early basketball career ==
Childs played his high school basketball at Foothill High School and starred at Boise State University in the late 1980s. Childs was the Big Sky Conference Player of the Year in 1989.

Despite his collegiate success, Childs went undrafted in the 1989 NBA draft and began his professional career in the Continental Basketball Association. He played for three different teams in his first three seasons in the league, but eventually found a home with the Quad City Thunder. With the Thunder, Childs won a league title and the CBA Playoff Finals/MVP award in 1994 after averaging 17.9 points and 7.6 assists.

According to Quad City Thunder owner Anne Potter DeLong's obituary on QCOnline, Childs struggled with alcoholism during his time in the Continental Basketball Association. Childs went to DeLong for help at which point she called former NBA player George Gervin who facilitated Childs' admittance to a rehab facility in Houston, Texas. The clinic was run by retired NBA player John Lucas II.

== NBA career ==
Childs' success in the minor leagues proved to be his ticket to the NBA, as he signed with the New Jersey Nets prior to the start of the 1994–95 NBA season. He spent his first two seasons with the Nets, and averaged an NBA career-high 12.8 points in 1995–96.

However, Childs was perhaps best remembered for his five-year (1996–2001) tenure with the New York Knicks, who relied on his tight defense and streaky three-point shooting ability during their perennial runs to the NBA playoffs. It was during this time that Childs helped lead the New York Knicks to the NBA Eastern Conference championship in 1999. He led the team in assists (6.1 per game) as a starter during the 1996–97 season, and was a valuable contributor off the bench during his next four years with the team. A visible figure in the New York media, he also represented the Knicks on the 1998–99 NBA All-Interview Team and won the New York Press Photographers Association's 2000 "Good Guy Award" for his involvement with several charities and youth basketball programs. On April 2, 2000, in a game against the Los Angeles Lakers at the Staples Center, he had a fight with Kobe Bryant late in the third quarter. Childs punched him from the chin into his throat. Both players were ejected and the Knicks lost the game 106–82.

In February 2001, Childs was traded to the Toronto Raptors for Mark Jackson and Muggsy Bogues, with whom he played for one-and-a-half seasons before rejoining the Nets in 2002. During that season, on October 22, 2002, Childs was suspended by the team indefinitely for not being in playing shape. Coincidentally, that same day, Childs was held up at gunpoint by three men outside a Manhattan restaurant owned by Sean Combs. Police say the alleged thieves made off with approximately $30,000 in cash and jewelry. Childs then retired after the 2002–03 season.
