= Utica Olympics =

- Division: Southern
- League: CBA
- Founded: 1978
- Folded: 1980
- History: Washington Metros (1977–78); Baltimore Metros (1978–79); Mohawk Valley Thunderbirds (1978–1979); Utica Olympics (1979–1980); Atlantic City Hi-Rollers (1980–1982)
- Location: Utica, New York

The Utica Olympics, known also as Mohawk Valley Thunderbirds, were an American professional basketball team based in Utica, New York that were members of the Continental Basketball Association (CBA) from 1978 to 1980.

The team was previously known as the Baltimore Metros. The team moved to Utica during the 1978–79 season and were renamed the Mohawk Valley Thunderbirds. The franchise disbanded following the season, but another Utica CBA franchise was created. They were known as the Utica Olympics and finished last place in the CBA following the 1979–1980 season, with a 15–31 record. The franchise was relocated to Atlantic City, New Jersey and became the Atlantic City Hi-Rollers. During their two seasons, the franchise had seven coaches: Larry Cannon, Fred Keller, Freddie Lewis, Nappy Doherty, James Klein, Dick Frank, and Gary Mazza.

In 1979, the Utica Police Department declined to renew a contract with the Utica public school system to serve as hall monitors in their eight schools. Superintendent of schools Dr. Anthony Scolzo called his acquaintance James Klein, the Olympics coach, to discuss his predicament. Klein recommended the schools hire Olympics players as hall monitors. Eventually, a total of eight players from Utica's roster served as hall monitors and two players, Bruce Lee and Ron McFarland, were promoted to substitute teachers.

== Year-by-year ==
Year	League	GP	W	L	Pct.	Finish	Playoffs
1978/79	CBA	31	16	15	.516	4th	N/A
1979/80	CBA	46	15	31	.326	4th, Southern	Did not qualify
Totals	CBA	77	31	46	.403	–	0-0 Playoff record
