= Puerto Rico Coquis =

- League: CBA
- Founded: 1983
- Dissolved: 1985
- Arena: Mets Pavilion (1983–84); Auditorio Juan Pachín Vicéns (1983–84); Municipal Coliseum (1984–85)
- Location: San Juan, Puerto Rico
- Team colors: Blue, Green

The Puerto Rico Coquis were a professional basketball team based in San Juan, Puerto Rico, playing home games at Mets Pavilion, Auditorio Juan Pachín Vicéns, and Municipal Coliseum. The Coquis were a member of the Continental Basketball Association (CBA) from 1983 until 1985. After the 1985 season, the team was moved from San Juan to Bangor, Maine and rebranded as the Maine Windjammers.
