= Washington Metros =

The Washington Metros were a professional basketball team based in Washington, D.C. that was a member of the Eastern Basketball Association. Following the 1977–78 season, the team became the Baltimore Metros.

== Year-by-year ==
Year	League	GP	W	L	Pct.	Reg. season	Playoffs
1977–78	EBA	31	5	26	.161	5th, Western	Did not qualify
