= Baltimore Metros =

- League: CBA
- Founded: 1978
- Dissolved: 1979
- History: Washington Metros (1977–1978); Baltimore Metros (1978–1979); Mohawk Valley Thunderbirds (1979–1980)
- Team colors: orange, white, black
- Affiliations: Washington Bullets, Atlanta Hawks, Milwaukee Bucks

The Baltimore Metros were an American basketball team based in Baltimore, Maryland that were a member of the Continental Basketball Association (CBA).

The team was previously known as the Washington Metros. During the 1978/79 season, the team moved to Utica and became the Mohawk Valley Thunderbirds.

On September 23, 1978, the Metros held a try-out camp for the upcoming season at Lake Clifton High School. The team's head coach was Larry Cannon. The Metros were affiliated with three NBA teams, the Washington Bullets; the Atlanta Hawks; and the Milwaukee Bucks.

== Year-by-year ==
Year	League	GP	W	L	Pct.	Reg. season	Playoffs
1978/79	CBA					N/A	N/A
