= House Bill 5414 =

Abortion-rights law in U.S. state of Connecticut

Reproductive Freedom Defense Act
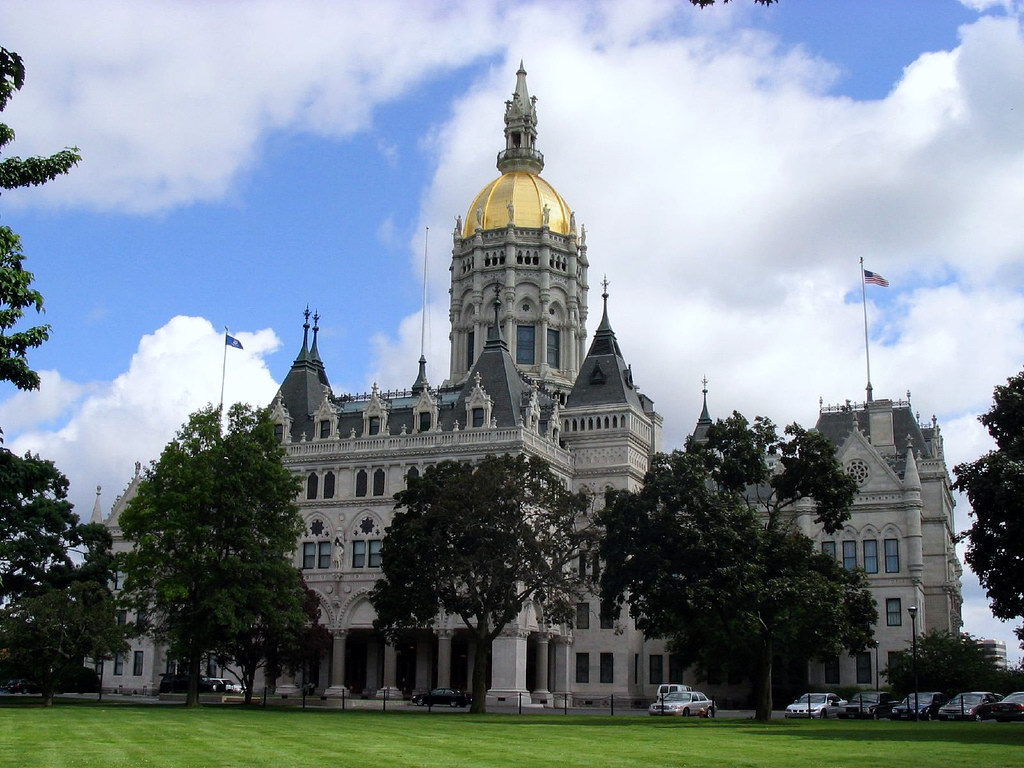

Connecticut General Assembly
- Long title: An Act concerning the provision of protections for persons providing and receiving reproductive health care services in the state and access to reproductive health care services in the state
- Citation: PL 22-19
- Territorial extent: U.S. state of Connecticut
- Passed by: Connecticut House of Representatives
- Passed: April 19, 2022
- Passed by: Connecticut State Senate
- Passed: April 29, 2022
- Signed by: Gov. Ned Lamont
- Signed: May 5, 2022
- Effective: July 1, 2022

Legislative history

First chamber: Connecticut House of Representatives
- Bill title: HB 5414
- Introduced by: Reps. Matt Blumenthal and Jillian Gilchrest
- Introduced: March 9, 2022
- Status: In force

House Bill 5414, passed by the Connecticut General Assembly and signed into law by that U.S. state's Governor, Ned Lamont, on May 5, 2022, as the Reproductive Freedom Defense Act, is intended to protect abortion in the state and expand the procedure's availability. Several of its provisions are responses to the Texas Heartbeat Act, passed in late 2021 and since emulated by two other states, that would prevent enforcement in Connecticut of judgements obtained by lawsuits filed under those laws against abortion providers, patients and those who facilitate them. It also allows more non-physician providers to perform certain types of abortions, codifying a past legal opinion. The law took effect July 1.

The bill was introduced in March by Rep. Matt Blumenthal, a member of the state House from the Democratic Party, which strongly supports abortion rights nationally and enjoys a trifecta in Connecticut, with majority control of both houses of the legislature and the governor's office. Five weeks later it was passed by the House with support from most Democrats and some members of the Republican minority; the state Senate followed 10 days later. In both chambers' debates some Black female Democratic members voted in opposition; while they knew the bill would pass, they spoke of their frustration with the lack of any birth control options for young women in their communities besides abortion and the unsavory past they associated with the procedure. Lamont had promised he would sign the bill; during the week after its passage, a draft majority opinion in the U.S. Supreme Court's then pending Dobbs v. Jackson Women's Health Organization, which as it did when handed down at the end of June overturned Roe v. Wade, its 1973 decision striking down most state abortion laws, was leaked and published, giving the bill greater urgency for its supporters.

== Background ==
=== Texas ===
Anti-abortion legislators in Texas, where Roe had originally been filed, and other states had been trying for several years to pass "heartbeat" bills that would ban all abortions after a fetal heartbeat can be detected, usually within six weeks of conception. This conflicts with Planned Parenthood v. Casey, a successor case to Roe, which had held that the state can regulate abortion prior to viability, roughly twice that time, only to the extent necessary to protect the health of the patient, and accordingly federal courts have barred enforcement of those laws.

In March 2021, Texas's Senate Bill 8, another heartbeat bill, allowing no exceptions even for pregnancies resulting from rape or incest, was introduced with provisions designed to prevent pre-enforcement injunctions: it allowed enforcement only through private lawsuits by private citizens who were not government employees. Since only state officials can be sued to prevent enforcement of an allegedly unconstitutional law, its supporters expected it to survive a facial court challenge.

In May of that year it passed both houses of the legislature and was signed into law by governor Greg Abbott as the Texas Heartbeat Act. On September 1 it went into effect. Lawsuits were filed in state and federal court to block it. The former resulted in a December ruling that held portions of the bill in violation of the Texas Constitution but declined to enjoin its enforcement.

The federal action, Whole Women's Health v. Jackson, sought to block enforcement before its effective date by naming several court clerks and judges as defendants on the grounds that, as state officials, they would play a role in enforcing the law. The motion for a preliminary injunction reached the U.S. Supreme Court, which held that the plaintiffs lacked standing as no actual suit against an abortion provider had yet been brought. On remand to the Fifth Circuit of Appeals, the Texas Supreme Court was asked to certify whether state medical licensing officials could be named as defendants since they might have the power to enforce sanctions against providers accused of violating the law. It said the law prohibited those officials from doing so, and without any defendants, the suit had to be dismissed. (Note: The Court withdrew certiorari as improvidently granted for a parallel case brought by the Justice Department.)

=== Connecticut ===
Connecticut has been a national leader in both restricting and permitting abortion, dating to colonial times. In 1742 a Pomfret woman named Sarah Grosvenor died from the complications of a surgical abortion. John Hallowell, the physician believed to have performed it, and Amasa Sessions, the suitor who had allegedly impregnated her, were tried under common law for causing her death; Hallowell was convicted of a misdemeanor and Sessions acquitted of all charges. It was the first known criminal prosecution of a physician over an abortion in British America. Connecticut also became the first state to criminalize abortion in its statutes in 1821, when it made it illegal for pharmacists to sell mixtures designed to induce abortions after the fourth month of a pregnancy.

The Supreme Court's 1965 Griswold v. Connecticut decision, striking down the state's prohibition on the sale or use of contraceptives, laid the legal foundation for Roe through its recognition of an implied constitutional right to privacy. In Connecticut a large group of women filed suit in federal court for the District of Connecticut to block enforcement of the state's abortion law, which allowed the procedure only when the life of the patient was in danger. The court ruled in their favor in 1972, and after the General Assembly amended the statute to include a preamble stating its purpose in preserving life, it found that insufficient when it reviewed the statute a second time later that year, holding that a fetus is not a person within the meaning of the Fourteenth Amendment.

Roe made any appeal moot, and in the years afterwards a postmortem 1964 photograph of Gerri Santoro, a Coventry woman who died in a Norwich motel after her boyfriend attempted to perform a surgical abortion on her, became a rallying image for the national abortion rights movement. In 1990, Gov. William O'Neill, despite his personal opposition to abortion as a Catholic, signed into law a bill that had passed the General Assembly overwhelmingly, repealing Connecticut's older statutes criminalizing abortion and declaring that, prior to viability, the decision about the abortion was entirely the woman's. This ensured that even were Roe to be overturned, abortion would remain legal in Connecticut under its terms.

In the late 20th century Connecticut voters began to be seen as strongly supportive of abortion rights across party lines as the Democratic Party dominated state politics. Thomas Meskill, governor during the 1972 federal lawsuit, was the last executive to actively oppose abortion rights. The next Republican to win that post, John Rowland, supported abortion rights in office after having been opposed to them as a member of the U.S. House.

In early 2021, Connecticut Reps. Matt Blumenthal, of the state House's 147th district in the Fairfield County towns of Darien and Stamford, also son of the state's senior U.S. Senator Richard Blumenthal, and Jillian Gilchrest from the 18th district in West Hartford, also formerly the executive director of NARAL Pro-Choice Connecticut, formed the House's Reproductive Freedom Caucus out of concern that the U.S. Supreme Court's disinterest in reviewing the Texas law, and some of the justices' questions and statements during oral argument in Dobbs, indicated that Roe's overturn was imminent. At a news conference held in late January by the caucus, activists, and other legislators including House Speaker Matthew Ritter, to mark the decision's 49th anniversary, Blumenthal noted that although Connecticut had long ago codified the terms of Roe into state law, "there is much more work to do to expand access to reproductive healthcare and protect our residents from other states' extreme laws. There is no time to waste: we must act now." He and Gilchrest indicated that, in consultation with the caucus, they would seek legislation that would expand access to abortion in the state, including greater Medicaid reimbursements for the procedure, allowing telehealth coverage and "policies to protect persons and practitioners and anyone seeking abortion care in Connecticut."

In the wake of the law's passage, abortion seekers went to clinics in other states, including those that do not border Texas. (Note: In May Blumenthal said that Connecticut providers had already reported being contacted by patients from Texas.) It was unclear whether it permitted suits against providers in other states who perform or oversee an abortion on a Texas patient, whether in person or remotely. A state legislator in Missouri introduced a bill that would specifically allow suits against providers in other states who perform abortions on Missouri women.

Blumenthal and Gilchrest introduced a bill in early March to address those concerns, based in part on a draft Columbia Law Review article exploring the possible extraterritoriality issues that would arise in the wake of Roe''s overturn, and how states wishing to continue providing legal abortion could exploit them to do so. It was given the number 5414 and referred to the General Assembly's Judiciary Committee. (Note: In Connecticut the Judiciary Committee is a joint committee, with members from both House and Senate.) A week later, Idaho's legislature passed a law similar to Texas's and sent it to governor Brad Little for his signature. (Note: Oklahoma, Texas's northern neighbor, passed its version of the same law on May 25.) Neighboring Washington responded with a law forbidding the state from prosecuting anyone involved in an abortion, with the intent of allowing Idaho abortion seekers to avail themselves of the procedure in Washington.

== Legislation ==
As passed, HB 5414, seven pages long, amends the sections of the Connecticut General Statutes related to criminal procedure, evidence, particularly privileged communications and confidentiality requirements, and the state's public health law governing abortion.

After defining "reproductive health care services" and "person" for the purposes of the bill, the latter including associations, corporations and partnerships, it:

- Allows anyone sued in another state for lawfully providing reproductive health care services in Connecticut to countersue in Connecticut the party who brought the action and recover attorney's fees incurred in both suits as well as damages equal to those awarded by the foreign (Note: In American legal discourse, the term for another state's legal and judicial systems) court, as long as some part of the actions resulting in the first suit took place in Connecticut.
- Prohibits any person or business involved in providing health care services (Note: As defined at 45 CFR § 160.103.) from disclosing confidential personal information obtained during treatment or examination for reproductive health services legal in Connecticut without the patient's consent, (Note: The Connecticut Hospital Association, which supported the bill in general, asked the committee to rewrite the bill's second section in order to conform with provisions of the federal Health Insurance Portability and Accountability Act, which governs how health care providers handle personal information, to avoid situations where they might be unable to release information that might have a legitimate purpose, or where information that might identify patients might be inadvertently released in response to a subpoena.) with the exception of certain categories of professionals (Note: Physicians (including psychiatrists), psychologists, domestic violence or sexual assault counselors, marital and family therapists, social workers and counselors) who may disclose such information in situations where they have always been allowed to, such as reasonable fear that the patient will hurt themselves or others.
- Prohibits Connecticut's courts and their officers from issuing subpoenas related to court actions in other states over reproductive health services provided at least in part lawfully in Connecticut, or issuing orders commanding persons in Connecticut to appear in such proceedings out of state.
- Prohibits the governor from extraditing to another state any individual accused of committing an act in that state which would be legal in Connecticut.
- Prohibits any state agency, officials, employees or person acting on their behalf from using any public resources to assist in the investigation of such an act by foreign authorities.
- Allows advance practice registered nurses, nurse midwives and physician's assistants to perform aspiration and medication abortions.
- Broadens the language for those individuals pregnant and seeking an abortion from "women" to "patients".

== Passage ==
=== House ===
At the end of March the committee reported it out favorably by a 24–14 vote, dividing along party lines, with one member absent. It was filed with the legislative commissioner's office for legal and fiscal analysis, then put on the House calendar April 14. Five days later, it was combined through an amendment on a 93–54 vote largely along party lines with a separate bill that allowed nonphysicians to perform certain types of abortions, and passed by an 87–60 vote. Seven Republicans, mostly women, including Laura Devlin, the party's likely candidate for lieutenant governor in that year's election, voted for passage while 14 Democrats opposed it; Four members were absent.

The Democrats who opposed the bill were largely from the state's Black and Puerto Rican communities. One, Rep. Treneé McGee of West Haven, who had taken her seat six months earlier in a special election where she had run on a "consistent life ethic", opposed to not only abortion but the death penalty and euthanasia, said she knew the bill would pass but had to speak against it anyway, having been the only Democrat to vote against the amendment combining the two bills. "I want to speak to the history of this industry and why I think it's destructive to my community", she said, noting that Black women account for a share of abortions performed that is more than twice their percentage of the overall population. She believed too many Black women had come to consider abortion the only form of birth control and that her community had more pressing needs than abortion access.

A Democrat who voted for the bill, Rep. Aimee Berger-Girvalo of Ridgefield, recalled her own abortion at 18. She had made the decision with her boyfriend, who later became father to her children, crossing "a barrier of protestors yelling and grabbing at me" to get in to the clinic. "I have never once regretted my choice", she said. Berger-Girvalo recalled the experience by way of supporting the provision that expanded those who could perform abortions, saying she would have been a lot more comfortable in that situation dealing with the APRN who gave her annual exams at the time instead of strangers.

Some Republicans who voted against the bill said that while they supported the legal protections against lawsuits from Texas, they were opposed to the provisions allowing nonphysicians to perform some nonsurgical abortions. "We can all agree that we want abortions to be legal, safe and rare," said Rep. Kimberly Fiorello of Greenwich. "And I believe that this bill is going in the opposite direction." Rep. Vincent Candelora of North Branford, the House minority leader, expressed doubts about the bill's constitutionality. "It's creating a cause of action for anyone to come into Connecticut, to bring third-party lawsuits for judgments that might have been held against them in other states", he said during floor debate on the bill. "[T]hat sort of impacts the notion that states are allowed to govern themselves." Blumenthal said later that clarifying language added during the debate had sufficiently addressed that concern.

At a news conference that morning, Governor Ned Lamont announced he would sign the bill if the General Assembly passed it, likening the Texas law to "vigilante justice". He was flanked by two activists on the issue, Amanda Skinner, president of Planned Parenthood of Southern New England, and Janée Woods Webber, executive director of the Connecticut Women's Education and Legal Fund, who said "we will never achieve gender equity or economic equity without full reproductive freedom." Skinner praised the services-expansion provision as it would shorten a two-week waiting period for first-trimester abortions in the state.

=== Senate ===
Ten days later, on April 29, the Senate brought the bill to a vote. Debate opened that evening and ended shortly before midnight with the bill passing, 25–9. As in the House, while Democrats predominantly supported the bill and Republicans opposed it, there were exceptions on both sides. Two Republicans were absent.

Again, Democratic opposition came from Black women representing the state's larger cities. As Rep. McGee had, Sen. Patricia Billie Miller of Stamford talked of abortions being forced on enslaved and Native women in the past: "There's no way that I can accept a system that would intentionally take a baby from a mother", she said. She also noted that in discussions of the state's juvenile justice system, it was noted that the human brain is not fully developed until the age of 25. Yet the state allowed teenagers to have abortions without their parents' consent or knowledge. Citing friends who had had abortions at that age which still bothered them, she said "I will not stand here and support a system that was designed to take advantage of people who didn't know any better."

Miller agreed it was ultimately a woman's choice since it was her body, but reminded her colleagues, as McGee had, that women in her community needed support in all reproductive choices and many of them terminated pregnancies only because they believed they had no other options. Another senator, Marilyn Moore of Bridgeport, who had worked at Planned Parenthood for eight years, castigated that organization for some of its past associations with racism and said it had to do better in its relationship with the Black community. "People talk about why Black people don't want to get vaccinated because we've had medical apartheid ... Right now, I'm not feeling good about this bill." Sen. Douglas McCrory of the city of Hartford, the state capitol, supported the bill and abortion rights but agreed that McGee's remarks in the House had "pulled the scab off something."

Some Republicans supported the bill. "It is somewhat outrageous that another state thinks it can come into our state and sue clinicians", said Heather Somers of Groton.

=== Signature ===
Following the bill's passage, it was certified and prepared for Lamont's signature by the offices of the legislative commissioner and the Secretary of State. Two days later, a leaked draft of the Dobbs opinion suggesting the Court would indeed overrule Roe and return abortion regulation to the states circulated, greatly alarming abortion-rights activists. Lamont alluded to this when he signed the bill on video in his office, without any ceremony, May 5. "This is a bill I wanted to sign as soon as possible", he said. Senate president pro tempore Martin Looney of New Haven called the bill a "defense of our own values and our own legal system."

== Reaction ==
"Connecticut is on the right side of history in defending her rights" the Connecticut Post editorialized. Before the bill passed, Slate called it "the gold standard for pro-choice legislation in the post-Roe era" and likened its no-extradition clause to measures taken by Northern states to frustrate the enforcement of the Fugitive Slave Act before the Civil War. "[T]his law will add a much-needed protection for patients", wrote The Progressive.

Peter Wolfgang of the Family Institute of Connecticut, a conservative religious organization, was encouraged despite the bill's passage. "[T]he debate over HB 5414 ... has exposed cracks in the abortion industry's political support in Connecticut" he told the Hartford Courant. "They won the bill. Pro-lifers won the argument." The Charlotte Lozier Institute, an anti-abortion think tank associated with the Susan B. Anthony Pro-Life America political action committee, said Connecticut was "encourag[ing] abortion tourism on an unprecedented level."

David Cohen, a professor at Drexel University's Thomas R. Kline School of Law whose research had been drawn on to write the bill, said that although California and Washington had previously enacted some aspects of HB 5414, Connecticut's bill went further than either in its specific protections for providers. It was also the first bill to combine all those protections in a single bill. "It's definitely going to have a ripple effect," said Pitt law professor Greer Donley, who had worked with Cohen.

== Political impact ==
After the bill's passage, Bob Stefanowski, the Republican candidate to run against Lamont in that year's election, (Note: Lamont had defeated him in 2018.) had no immediate comment beyond an assurance that abortion would always be a protected right in the state in response to the leaked Dobbs opinion. Sen. Heather Somers, a Republican from Groton who had voted for the bill, noted that Stefanowski's running mate, Rep. Laura Devlin, had also voted in support and expressed concern that "[t]his is definitely going to be a campaign issue" since Stefanowski would be asked whether he would have signed it.

"I think that any candidate for governor has got to speak up and let us know where you stand", said Lamont as he signed the bill again at a May 10 ceremony on the capitol steps. "What have I heard from [Stefanowski]? Crickets." His lieutenant governor, Susan Bysiewicz, raised the same doubts. "It's one thing to support the current law", she said. "It's another thing to step forward and say if a bill should come to your desk, that you will veto it, and you will fight any attempts to weaken our law, because those happen every year."

One General Assembly race was affected by the vote on the bill. In Greenwich, Trevor Crow, a Democrat who had lost her 2021 race for the position of the town's tax collector, announced before Lamont had signed the bill that she would be challenging Ryan Fazio, the incumbent Republican state senator for the 36th district, which includes all of Greenwich as well as portions of neighboring Stamford and New Canaan. Fazio had been elected in a special election eight months earlier after his predecessor, Alexandra Kasser, the first Democrat to win that seat in almost 90 years, resigned early in her second term to focus on her contentious divorce.

While Crow cited several issues with Fazio as her reasons for running against him, she emphasized his vote against HB 5414. "Just last week, my opponent cast a vote that attacks reproductive rights by endangering health care providers", she said. "That's the kind of extremism that Connecticut voters won't tolerate." Fazio called that statement "misleading", noting that his vote was not meant to show support for recriminalizing abortion in Connecticut, nor did he expect that to happen. Instead, he expressed concern over the service-expansion provisions, saying that the bill "undermine[d] women's health and safety by lowering the safety standards for who can conduct surgical abortions in Connecticut." (Note: The bill only allowed the specified non-physicians to perform medication and aspiration abortions. The latter are considered surgical but do not require the use of hard metal instruments, the use of which in abortions is reserved for physicians in Connecticut and most other jurisdictions.)

== Influence on legislation elsewhere ==
The day after Lamont signed HB 5414, District of Columbia councilwoman Brianne Nadeau, chair of its Human Services Committee, introduced the Human Rights Sanctuary Amendments Act of 2022 along with nine other sponsors. "The bill is modeled, in part, on Connecticut's recently passed Reproductive Freedom Defense Act", she wrote. It, too, provided for countersuits by any District (D.C.) residents sued in another state for their role in providing abortions within the district, but also specifically mentioned providing or using contraception, gender-affirming care (Note: HB 5414 did not mention this specifically, but Blumenthal said later that it was covered.) and entering into or performing same-sex marriages, other targets or possible target of laws in Texas and other states, as covered activities. "It protects the rights of District residents to live with whom they please, love whom they love, and control their reproductive destinies." Passage remained uncertain as in the wake of Roe's reversal some members of Congress have vowed to introduce legislation not only banning abortions in the district but ending the District's home rule should they get a majority of seats in that year's elections to the House of Representatives, although such efforts had in the past failed to overcome the Senate filibuster.

In mid-June, the legislature of New York, Connecticut's southern and western neighbor, which had legalized abortion before Roe and like Connecticut has codified that decision into its laws, passed five bills intended to protect abortion rights, some of which included the same provisions as the Connecticut and D.C. laws: greater confidentiality between providers and patients, the specific inclusion of gender-affirming care, a prohibition on subpoenas related to foreign abortion prosecutions and extraditions of abortion providers unless they have fled to New York from other states as well as any law enforcement cooperation with such investigations. The New York laws, like HB 5414, allow countersuits by anyone sued elsewhere for providing or facilitating the provision of care legal in New York. In addition, they prohibit both disciplinary measures and adverse action by medical malpractice insurers related to providing the covered care. Kathy Hochul, the state's first female governor, signed them into law shortly afterwards; they took effect immediately. As in Connecticut, abortion opponents denounced the laws as promoting "abortion tourism".

Delaware passed its version, House Bill 455, at the end of the month, less than a week after Dobbs. Rep. Melissa Minor-Brown had introduced it at the beginning of the month; it passed the state House within two weeks by a 24-13 vote on party lines with four abstentions. The state Senate took it up immediately afterwards and similarly passed it 15–6 two weeks later, with Republican Ernesto Lopez crossing party lines to support. Governor John Carney signed it the day after passage. It includes many of the same provisions as HB 5414 and the New York legislation, going further to protect Delaware-based physicians, physician assistants, and APRNs from adverse disciplinary action over pre-viability abortions initiated by a state where the procedure remains legal. Those professionals will also be allowed to perform abortions in Delaware regardless of method. (Note: Unlike New York's law, Delaware's does not specifically mention gender-affirming care.)

At the same time, Phil Murphy, governor of New Jersey, between Delaware and New York, signed two bills passed by the state legislature that enacted some of the same provisions. The first prohibits disclosure of patients' identities without their consent in any civil, probate, legislative or administrative proceeding; prohibits public agencies and employees from cooperating with any investigation by another state into the provision of reproductive health care services that are lawful in New Jersey; and prohibits the state's licensing boards from taking adverse action against any licensed professional based solely on their involvement in providing those services. The second bill has the same prohibition on extradition found in the other laws.

A month later, legislators in another state bordering Connecticut, Massachusetts, passed its HB 5090, described as "the most comprehensive yet" of the "shield" laws like HB 5414. In addition to the provisions of the New York, Connecticut and Delaware laws, it provides that no physician, physician's assistant, advanced practice registered nurse, pharmacist, psychologist or social worker disciplined for, or convicted of charges related to, providing an abortion in another state, shall be barred from seeking the corresponding professional license in Massachusetts, nor shall the state include those actions on any records it makes available to the public. It also requires state university health offices to develop plans to provide abortion medications within a year, insurers to cover the full cost of abortions without any cost-sharing requirement except where doing so would violate federal law, and where an employer has a religious objection. It also specifies the conditions under which third-trimester abortions may be performed and leaves the judgement to the physician, prohibiting any review by a medical committee. Governor Charlie Baker signed the bill into law the day after passage.
