= Lisa Wilson-Foley =

American politician

- Citizenship: United States
- Education: Ithaca College; Yale University; University of Connecticut
- Occupation: Entrepreneur
- Political party: Republican
- Spouse: Brian Foley
- Children: Multiple

Lisa Wilson-Foley (born approximately 1960) is an American entrepreneur, former political candidate, and white collar criminal. She owns the rehabilitation company Allstar Therapy, the family entertainment business Blue Fox Enterprises, and the medical testing company Swallowing Diagnostics. She was a co-owner of the Hartford FoxForce from 1999-2007.

== Early life and education ==
Wilson-Foley graduated from Farmington High School in 1977. She received a B.S. from Ithaca College in 1981, a masters in Public Health from Yale University in 1988, and a degree in Executive Managed Care Division from the University of Connecticut in 1997. She received her doctorate from the University of Montana in 2013.

== Business career ==
A serial entrepreneur, she formed her first company at 29. In 1997 she sold her original healthcare businesses and as a result of an agreement she was prohibited from re-entering the healthcare field for several years. This forced her to pursue investments in the entertainment field. She is also involved in her husband's businesses. At the time of her conviction her personal net worth was estimated to be US$23 million, this is separate from her husband's nine figure net worth. Many of her businesses are owned through her holding company LWF Holdings. Her friend Janet Peckinpaugh served as the marketing director of LWF Holdings. In 2010 her campaign claimed that she directly employed 500 people and had hosted a group of 15 Kenyan entrepreneurs on a tour of Connecticut.

=== Apple Rehab ===
In 2021 Apple Rehab's 60 bed nursing home in Watch Hill, Rhode Island announced that it would be closing. The facility was demolished in 2024.

In 2024 two residents died in a murder-suicide at Apple Rehab's 85 bed Cromwell, Connecticut nursing home.

As of 2024 Apple Rehab operated approximately 20 nursing homes in Connecticut and Rhode Island. Apple Rehab's Rhode Island nursing homes have been cited with hundreds of thousands of dollars' worth of code and standards violations.

=== Allstar Therapy ===
Allstar Therapy provides occupational, speech and physical rehabilitation in health care facilities throughout Connecticut, Massachusetts and Rhode Island. Allstar Therapy was sold in 2016.

=== Blue Fox Enterprises ===
In 1998 she acquired the Simsbury Bowling Center and renamed it Blue Fox Rock 'N Bowl and renovated it emphasize a family friendly atmosphere. In 1999 she acquired the Copper Hill Golf Club for $1.3m renaming it Fox Run at Copper Hill. The club was sold in 2010. The company recently sold three Victorian Bed and Breakfasts in Newport, RI.

==== Blue Fox Run Golf Course ====
Blue Fox Run is a 27-hole golf course owned by Wilson-Foley notable for being the first in the country to offer onsite childcare. In 1996 she purchased the property, then known as the Bel Compo Golf Course and having only 18 holes, for US$3.5m with her husband purchasing 55 adjoining acres. She was one of the first women in the United States to own a golf course. In 1997 Wilson-Foley successfully applied to rezone 15 of their acres to office park, the parcel was subsequently developed with three office buildings having been built as of 2012.

=== Hartford FoxForce ===
In 1999 Wilson-Foley and her husband franchised the World TeamTennis team Hartford FoxForce in Hartford, Connecticut. FoxForce's first drafted player was Monica Seles. In 2001 the team fielded brothers Murphy Jensen and Luke Jensen. Over the years the team fielded other well known players such as Bethanie Mattek-Sands, Boris Becker, and James Blake. The team played first at Hartford's 3,000 seat State Arsenal and Armory and later at a 2,500 seat outdoor stadium Wilson-Foley had built at her Blue Fox Run golf course. The Foley's shut the team down in 2007 due to a lack of corporate sponsorships. Mark Foley's Connecticut Pride also used the State Arsenal and Armory as a venue from 1993–2000.

== Philanthropy ==
Before her conviction Wilson-Foley served as the vice-chair of the board at The Bushnell Center for the Performing Arts. Previously she served on the board of the Renbrook School and the American School for the Deaf.

== Political campaigns ==
Lisa Wilson-Foley is a political protege of former Governor of Connecticut Republican and convicted felon John G. Rowland who called her "grasshopper" during his political tutelage.

=== Lieutenant governor ===
In 2010, Wilson-Foley announced that she was running for Lieutenant Governor of Connecticut as a Republican. Wilson-Foley's campaign platform was unique, she said she would refuse the salary, car, and driver that traditionally came with the position. In addition she proposed evaluating after two years on the job whether the position of Lieutenant Governor should be abolished entirely. She was the only candidate in the 2010 Connecticut gubernatorial election who ran for Lieutenant Governor without a gubernatorial running mate. She lost the election to Democrat Nancy Wyman.

=== U.S. Congressional Run ===
Lisa Wilson-Foley ran for the 2012 Congressional Election in Connecticut's 5th congressional district. Her run was endorsed by a number of prominent local politicians and was considered competitive. She declined public funding for her campaign and instead loaned her campaign just under a million dollars. In the Republican Primary she competed against Mark Greenberg, and Justin Bernier and Andrew Roraback. She was defeated by Roraback but waged a hard-fought campaign in which she and Roraback battled fiercely while largely ignoring the other two candidates. Roraback went on to be narrowly defeated by Democrat Elizabeth Esty.

==== Investigation ====
Soon after her loss her campaign became the subject of state and federal investigations. At the core of the investigations was her relationship with former Governor John Rowland. She had hired him to advise her campaign, but because he was a convicted felon and notoriously corrupt, she chose to pay him more than $35,000 through her husband's legitimate businesses in the hopes of avoiding negative publicity. By law, all paid campaign staff must be reported, which the Foley-Wilson campaign neglected to do. Rowland provided fraudulent invoices for services on behalf of the couple's nursing home company used as cover for the payments. Prosecutors alleged that Wilson-Foley, Foley, and Rowland all engaged in a conspiracy to steal the election along with a number of unindicted co-conspirators.

In addition to the charges related to Rowland's contracting she also ran afoul of a Federal Election Commission regulation regarding campaign contributions. Her campaign had failed to report a $500,000 contribution by Brian Foley, instead choosing to report it as Wilson-Foley's own contribution. This violation was discovered when her husband testified at his 2014 trial.

Brian Foley used four other individuals as straw donors to make donations that in and of themselves exceeded the individual contribution limit of US$2,500. The straw donor contributions totaled more than US$30,000. These violations were especially egregious as Wilson-Foley had also served as the campaign's treasurer. Foley and Wilson-Foley also used their business resources to directly support the campaign in violation of federal law. For example, members of the Apple Rehab marketing staff were unofficially assigned to the campaign and other staff members were tasked to personally lobby convention delegates to vote for Wilson-Foley.

In 2015 Wilson-Foley was sentenced to five months in prison and five months of home confinement. Federal Prosecutors had requested that she spend at least ten months in prison for her role in leading a "prolonged and calculated effort to defraud voters".

== Awards and recognitions ==
- Southern New England Entrepreneur of the Year (1995)

== Personal life and family ==
She met her husband Brian Foley while in grad school; he was one of her professors. Together they have a blended family with seven children. At the age of 40 she had a golf handicap of 21.
