= Ned Lamont =

Governor of Connecticut since 2019

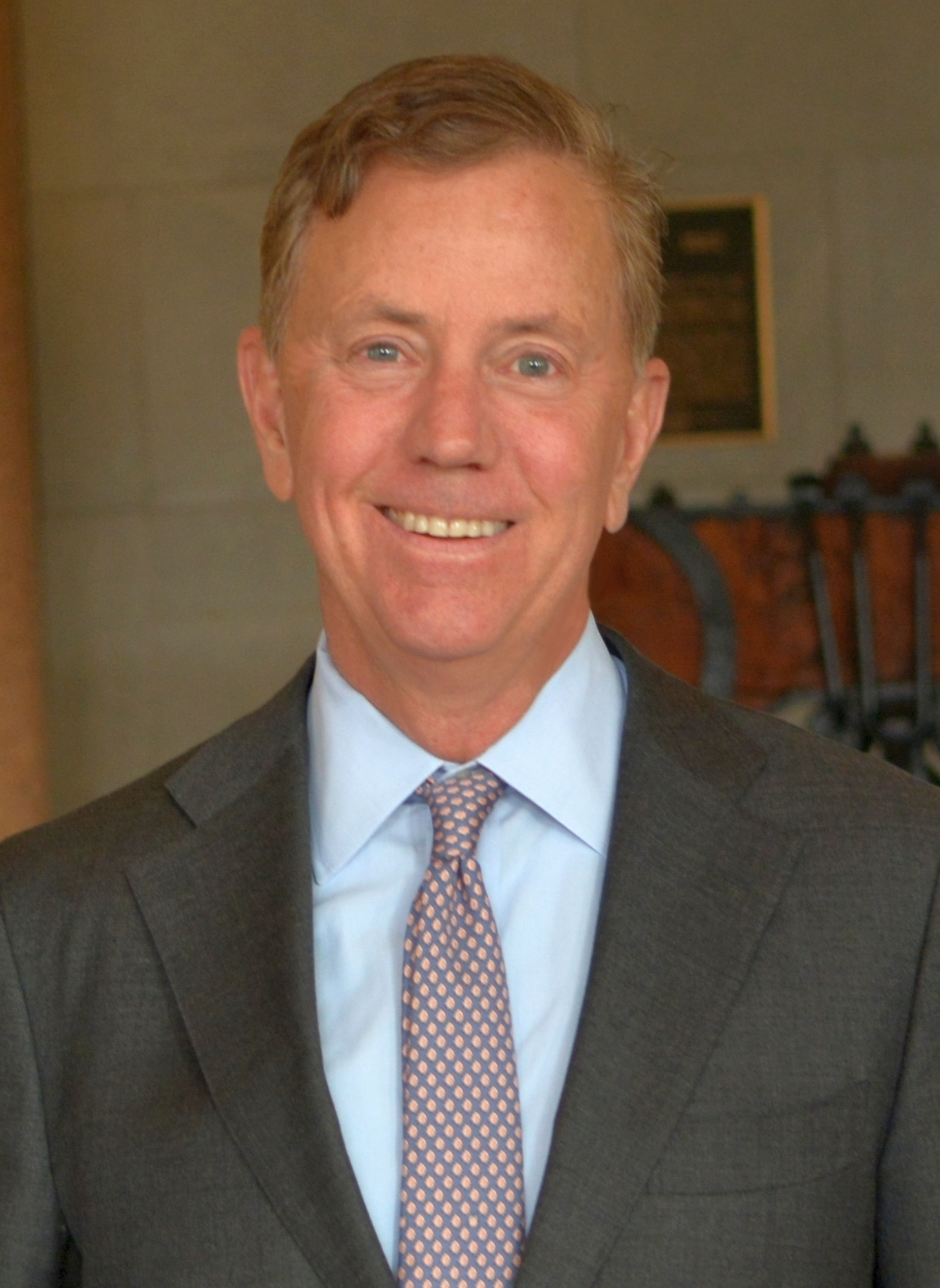
- Official portrait, 2019

89th Governor of Connecticut
- Incumbent
- Assumed office January 9, 2019
- Lieutenant: Susan Bysiewicz
- Preceded by: Dannel Malloy

Personal details
- Born: Edward Miner Lamont Jr. January 3, 1954 (age 72) Washington, D.C., U.S.
- Party: Democratic
- Spouse: Ann Huntress (m. 1983)
- Children: 3
- Relatives: Thomas W. Lamont (great-grandfather); Corliss Lamont (grand-uncle)
- Education: Harvard University (BA); Yale University (MBA)
- Website: Office website Campaign website
- Lamont's voice Lamont on the first 100 days of Barack Obama's presidency Recorded April 22, 2009

Edward Miner Lamont Jr. (/ləˈmɒnt/ lə-MONT; born January 3, 1954) is an American politician and businessman serving since 2019 as the 89th governor of Connecticut. A member of the Democratic Party, he served from 1987 to 1989 as a Greenwich selectman, and was the Democratic nominee for the United States Senate in 2006, losing to independent incumbent Joe Lieberman. (Note: Lamont defeated Lieberman in the Democratic primary, but Lieberman won the general election running as an independent candidate.)

Lamont ran for governor in 2010 but lost the Democratic primary to former Stamford mayor Dannel Malloy, who won the general election. He ran again in 2018, winning the nomination and defeating Republican Bob Stefanowski in the general election. He faced Stefanowski again in 2022, defeating him by a wider margin. As governor, Lamont signed legislation legalizing cannabis, sports betting, and online gambling. In 2025, Lamont vetoed legislation that would affect housing supply in Connecticut.

== Early life and education ==
Lamont was born on January 3, 1954, in Washington, D.C., to Camille Helene (née Buzby) and Edward Miner Lamont. His mother was born in San Juan, Puerto Rico, to parents from the U.S. mainland, and later worked as a staffer for Senator Estes Kefauver. His father, an economist, worked on the Marshall Plan and served in the Department of Housing and Urban Development during the Nixon administration. He is the great-grandson of former J. P. Morgan & Co. chair Thomas W. Lamont and a grand-nephew of former American Civil Liberties Union director and National Council of American–Soviet Friendship chairman and founder Corliss Lamont. He is a distant descendant of colonial diarist Thomas Minor, from whom he gets his middle name. (Note: The spelling of Minor's surname has historically varied between Minor and Miner.)

Lamont's family moved to Laurel Hollow on Long Island when he was seven years old. (Note: Some media outlets erroneously report Lamont's childhood home as Syosset, New York due to its shared ZIP Code (11791) with Laurel Hollow.) The eldest of three children, he and his sisters attended East Woods School. He later attended Phillips Exeter Academy, and served as president of the student newspaper, The Exonian. After graduating from Phillips Exeter in 1972, he earned a Bachelor of Arts in sociology from Harvard College in 1976 and a Master of Business Administration from the Yale School of Management in 1980.

== Professional career ==
In 1977, Lamont became editor for the Black River Tribune, a small weekly newspaper in Ludlow, Vermont. During his time there, he worked alongside journalists Jane Mayer and Alex Beam. After graduating from Yale, he entered the cable television industry, managing the startup operation in Fairfield County, Connecticut, for Cablevision. In 1984, he founded Campus Televideo, a company that provides cable and satellite services to college campuses across the country. He later chaired Lamont Digital Systems, a telecommunications firm that invests in new media startups. Campus Televideo was its largest division before Austin, Texas-based firm Apogee acquired it on September 3, 2015.

Lamont has volunteered at Warren Harding High School in Bridgeport, teaching entrepreneurship and coordinating internships with local businesses. He has been a teaching fellow at the Harvard Institute of Politics and the Yale School of Management, and an adjunct faculty member and chair of the Arts and Sciences Public Policy Committee at Central Connecticut State University (CCSU), where he was named Distinguished Professor of Political Science and Philosophy. During his time at CCSU, he was a lecturer in multiple classes and founded a business startup competition. In 2019, he delivered CCSU's commencement speech, his first as governor.

Lamont has served on the board of trustees for the Conservation Services Group, Mercy Corps, the Norman Rockwell Museum, the YMCA, and the Young Presidents' Organization. He has also served on the advisory boards of the Brookings Institution and the Yale School of Management.

== Early political career ==
Lamont was first elected in 1987 as a selectman in Greenwich, Connecticut, where he served for one term. He ran for state senate in 1990, against Republican William Nickerson and incumbent Emil Benvenuto (who had switched his party affiliation from Republican to A Connecticut Party). Nickerson won the three-way race with Lamont finishing third. Lamont later served for three terms on the Greenwich town finance board and chaired the State Investment Advisory Council, which oversees state pension fund investments.

=== 2006 U.S. Senate election ===
General election results by municipality. Shades of blue denote wins for Lamont, yellow for Lieberman.

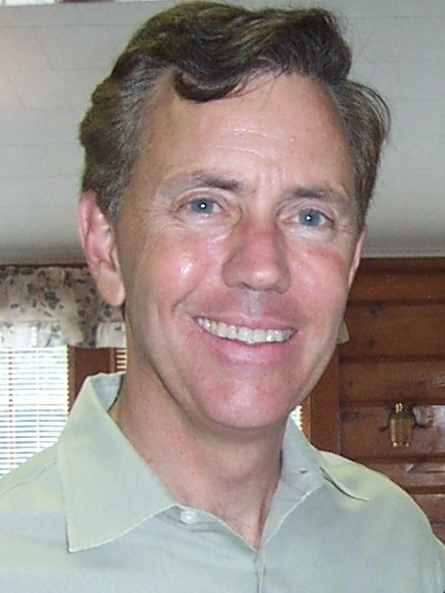
Lamont in 2006

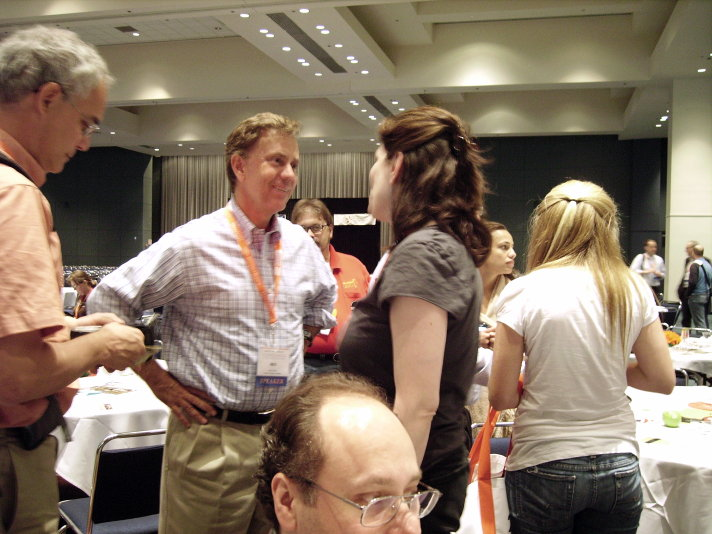
Lamont attending the 2007 YearlyKos conference at the McCormick Place in Chicago

On March 13, 2006, Lamont announced his campaign for the U.S. Senate against incumbent Joe Lieberman. On July 6, Lamont debated Lieberman on television, covering issues such as the Iraq War, energy policy, and immigration. During the debate, Lieberman argued he was being subjected to a litmus test on the war, insisted he was a "bread-and-butter Democrat", and repeatedly asked, "Who is Ned Lamont?" Lieberman also asked Lamont if he would release his income tax returns, which he did afterward.

Lamont focused on Lieberman's supportive relationship with Republicans, telling him "if you won't challenge President Bush and his failed agenda, I will." He criticized Lieberman's vote for the Energy Policy Act of 2005, which he dubbed the "Bush–Cheney–Lieberman energy bill." In response to the assertion that he supported Republican policies, Lieberman stated he had voted with Senate Democrats 90% of the time. Lamont argued the three-term incumbent lacked the courage to challenge the Bush administration on the Iraq War. He also criticized Lieberman for supporting federal intervention in the Terri Schiavo case.

On July 30, The New York Times editorial board endorsed Lamont. The same day, The Sunday Times reported that Bill Clinton warned Lieberman not to run as an independent if he lost the primary to Lamont. Pledging to refuse money from lobbyists during the election, Lamont funded most of his own campaign, with donations exceeding $12.7 million.

Lamont won the primary with 52% of the vote. (This was the only Senate race in 2006 where an incumbent lost re-nomination.) In his concession speech, Lieberman announced he was standing by his earlier statements that he would run as an independent if he lost the primary. Running under the banner of Connecticut for Lieberman, Lieberman won the general election with nearly 50% of the vote (exit polls showed Lieberman won 33% of Democrats, 54% of independents, and 70% of Republicans). The Sundance Channel documentary film Blog Wars chronicled the influence political blogging had on the election.

While some Research 2000 polls commissioned by the Daily Kos in 2007 and 2008 found he would win a Senate rematch with Lieberman by growing margins, Lamont said he was not considering another campaign for Senate. Research 2000 was later accused by the Daily Kos of fabricating their polling data. A lawsuit ended in 2012 with a default judgement against Research 2000.

=== 2008 presidential campaign activity ===
Lamont initially supported Chris Dodd's presidential campaign. After Dodd dropped out of the race, Lamont became a state co-chair for Barack Obama's presidential campaign. Obama's victory in the Connecticut Democratic primary was credited to Lamont's ability to turn out the voter base he had built during his Senate campaign. In March 2008, he was a state delegate to the 2008 Democratic National Convention, his support pledged to Obama.

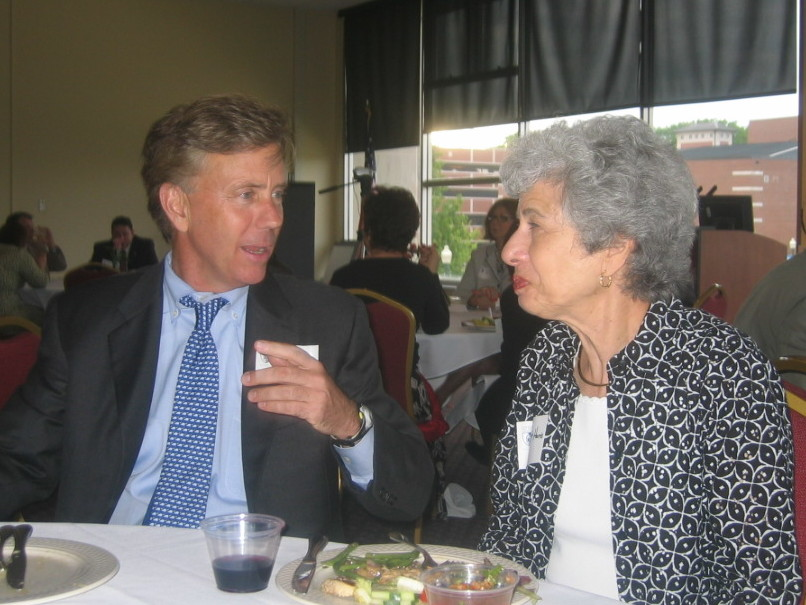
Lamont speaking with former CCSU president Merle Harris in June 2008

== Governor of Connecticut (2019–present) ==
=== Elections ===
==== 2010 ====
On February 16, 2010, Lamont announced his candidacy for the 2010 gubernatorial election. Former Stamford mayor Dannel Malloy defeated him at the state Democratic convention on May 22, with 1,232 votes (68%) to Lamont's 582 (32%). Since he won more than 15% of the vote, Lamont was eligible to appear on the primary election ballot. On August 10, he lost the primary to Malloy, receiving 43% of the vote. Malloy defeated Republican candidate Thomas C. Foley in the general election.

==== 2018 ====
General election results by municipality. Shades of blue denote wins for Lamont, red for Stefanowski.

On January 17, 2018, Lamont announced his candidacy to succeed Malloy, who was not seeking a third term. He received the party endorsement at the state convention, and chose former Connecticut Secretary of State Susan Bysiewicz as his running mate. While missing the 15% threshold, Bridgeport mayor and ex-convict Joe Ganim gathered enough signatures to appear on the Democratic primary ballot. Despite the challenge, Lamont won the primary by over 130,000 votes (a 62.4% margin). He then faced Republican Bob Stefanowski and independent Oz Griebel in the general election on November 6. Later that night, Griebel conceded the election; Stefanowski conceded early the next morning.

==== 2022 ====
Lamont won reelection to a second term as governor, with Bysiewicz as his running mate. He won the Democratic primary unopposed. He defeated Stefanowski in a rematch of their 2018 election with Lamont winning by a wider margin, becoming the first Democrat to win a gubernatorial election by more than five points in the state since 1986.

==== 2026 ====
Lamont defeated Republican nominee Ryan Fazio with 58.81% of the vote to win a third term.

=== Administration ===
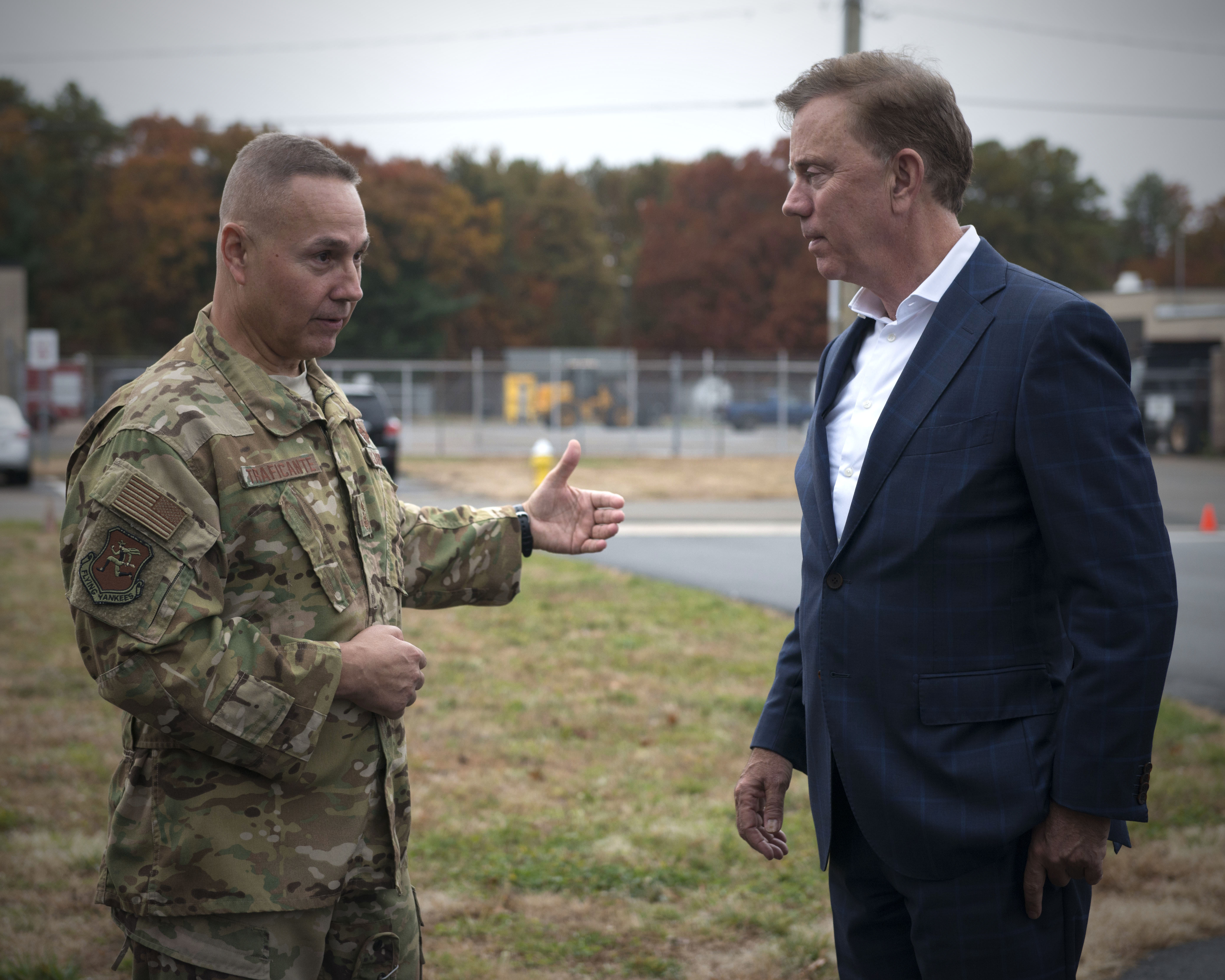
Lamont visiting the Connecticut Air National Guard after the 2019 Boeing B-17 Flying Fortress crash

Lamont was sworn in as the 89th governor of Connecticut on January 9, 2019, succeeding Dannel Malloy. Some of his top priorities upon taking office included implementing electronic tolls on state highways; taxing online streaming services; restoring the property tax credit; legalizing marijuana for recreational use; increasing the minimum wage to $15 per hour; instituting paid family and medical leave; renegotiating contracts with public-sector unions; and legalizing sports betting. Lamont also prioritized investments in rail infrastructure, proposing shorter travel times between cities by upgrading rail lines, as well as extending the Danbury Branch to New Milford and re-electrifying the line.

==== First term (2019−2023) ====
In February 2019, Lamont appointed former PepsiCo CEO Indra Nooyi co-director of the Connecticut Economic Resource Center (CERC), a public-private partnership with the Department of Economic and Community Development tasked with revamping the state's economic development strategy. A year later, CERC rebranded itself as AdvanceCT. In April 2019, Lamont signed his first executive order, which directed state office buildings and vehicle fleets to become more energy-efficient through an expanded "Lead By Example Sustainability Initiative". The initiative aims to reduce both the carbon footprint and cost of state government operations. In June 2019, Lamont signed a bill that banned gay panic defense in Connecticut, and also signed three gun-control bills, including Ethan's Law, which requires safely storing firearms in households where children are present, bans privately made firearms, and bans storing unlocked guns in unattended vehicles.

On June 26, Lamont signed his first biennium state budget, amounting to $43 billion. Because of the state's heavy reliance on business tax revenue, specifically from the finance and insurance sectors, Connecticut had struggled with large fluctuations and shortfalls in revenue. To balance the budget (as legally required) without increasing income taxes, two state pension funds were restructured to reduce expenses for two years. $170 million in transportation spending was cut, numerous taxes and fees increased, and several previously approved tax cuts canceled. This included an additional $50 million of taxes on LLCs and other small and mid-sized businesses, a 10% tax increase on alcoholic beverages and a 1% surcharge on restaurant food and other prepared meals. The budget also assumed the administration would save almost $460 million over two years by collaborating with state employee unions. Personal income tax rates did not increase in either of the biennium budgets Lamont signed.

Despite these cuts and tax increases, the budget increased funding for education and workforce development, maintained municipal aid funding so mayors and first selectmen had stability in local budgets, and included $2.2 billion in the state's rainy day fund, the largest in state history at the time. Lamont said, "It's a budget that I think gets us back on track, holds the line on spending, holds the line on taxes. It gives people a great deal of confidence they know what's going on." On March 8, 2020, Connecticut reported its first confirmed COVID-19 case. As cases rose, Lamont declared a public health emergency. He limited visits to nursing homes and ordered all schools to close on March 16. Lamont issued an executive order closing all non-essential businesses on March 20 and issued a stay-at-home order on March 23. As cases continued to rise, he limited gathering sizes to five people and mandated face coverings in public. On May 20, Lamont lifted the stay-at-home order as cases began to subside. In the summer, non-essential businesses such as barber shops, gyms, and malls began to open. In the fall, cases and deaths began to rise again in the state. The state kept the mask mandate in place.

In July 2020, Lamont signed into law a sweeping police reform bill that requires all police officers to be equipped with body cameras, prohibits maneuvers such as chokeholds, creates a statewide watchdog for police misconduct, limits police departments' ability to withhold disciplinary records, and makes individual officers liable in civil lawsuits. On December 15, 2020, the first person in the state received the COVID-19 vaccine. In coordination with the federal government and private hospitals, Connecticut became the first state to vaccinate 50% of its adult population. On May 19, 2021, Lamont ended most of the state's restrictions. Bars, theaters, and ballparks were all able to open, but people were encouraged to wear masks. On May 29, Lamont signed a bill raising the state minimum hourly wage to $11 that year in October and $15 by 2023. Also in May 2021, he signed into law a bill to legalize online sports betting and gaming. His office negotiated the deal's terms with the General Assembly, the Mohegan Tribe, and the Mashantucket Pequot Tribe.

In June 2021, Lamont signed his second biennium state budget, amounting to $46 billion. The balanced budget, passed with bipartisan support, expanded HUSKY A health insurance for 40,000 people, increased the state's rainy day fund to $4.5 billion, and increased the state's earned income tax credit for low-income earners to 30% of the federal credit, up from 23%, and also legalized recreational marijuana usage for adults and created a legal framework for retailers. Connecticut is the 19th state to end cannabis prohibition. On June 25, Lamont signed into law an expansive family and medical leave program. Starting in 2022, Connecticut workers will be able to take up to 12 weeks of paid leave. Workers will be eligible for paid time off to care for a newborn, a seriously ill relative, or their own medical issue. The plan is paid for by a 0.5% payroll tax on all employees.

In July 2021, Lamont signed a highway user fee on large commercial transports. The measure charges 2.5 cents per mile for vehicles weighing 26,000 to 28,000 pounds and 17.5 cents per mile for trucks weighing more than 80,000 pounds. The revenue is to be used to help repair state roads and highways. Connecticut ranked 24th in CNBC's annual Top States for Business study, up from 35th in the previous study, conducted in 2019. The state's ranking was driven by improvements in business friendliness, access to capital, infrastructure, and economy categories. In October 2021, sports betting and online gaming officially launched. Bets can be made online at sites such as DraftKings and FanDuel and at a select few locations, including Mohegan Sun and Foxwoods Casino.

In November 2021, at least 80% of people in the state, including children who had just been approved to receive the vaccine by the FDA, were partially vaccinated, and administration of Connecticut's CARES Act and American Rescue Plan Act funds for economic recovery and stimulus. According to the 2021 analysis of Connecticut's business environment the Connecticut Business & Industry Association conducts annually, business confidence was up 7% from the previous year while perception that the state's business climate was on the decline dropped by 15% from the previous year.

On May 5, 2022, Lamont signed into law House Bill 5414, which was intended to protect abortion in Connecticut. It also prevents Connecticut judges from suing any person or corporation for receiving or performing an abortion in the state.

==== Second term (2023−present) ====
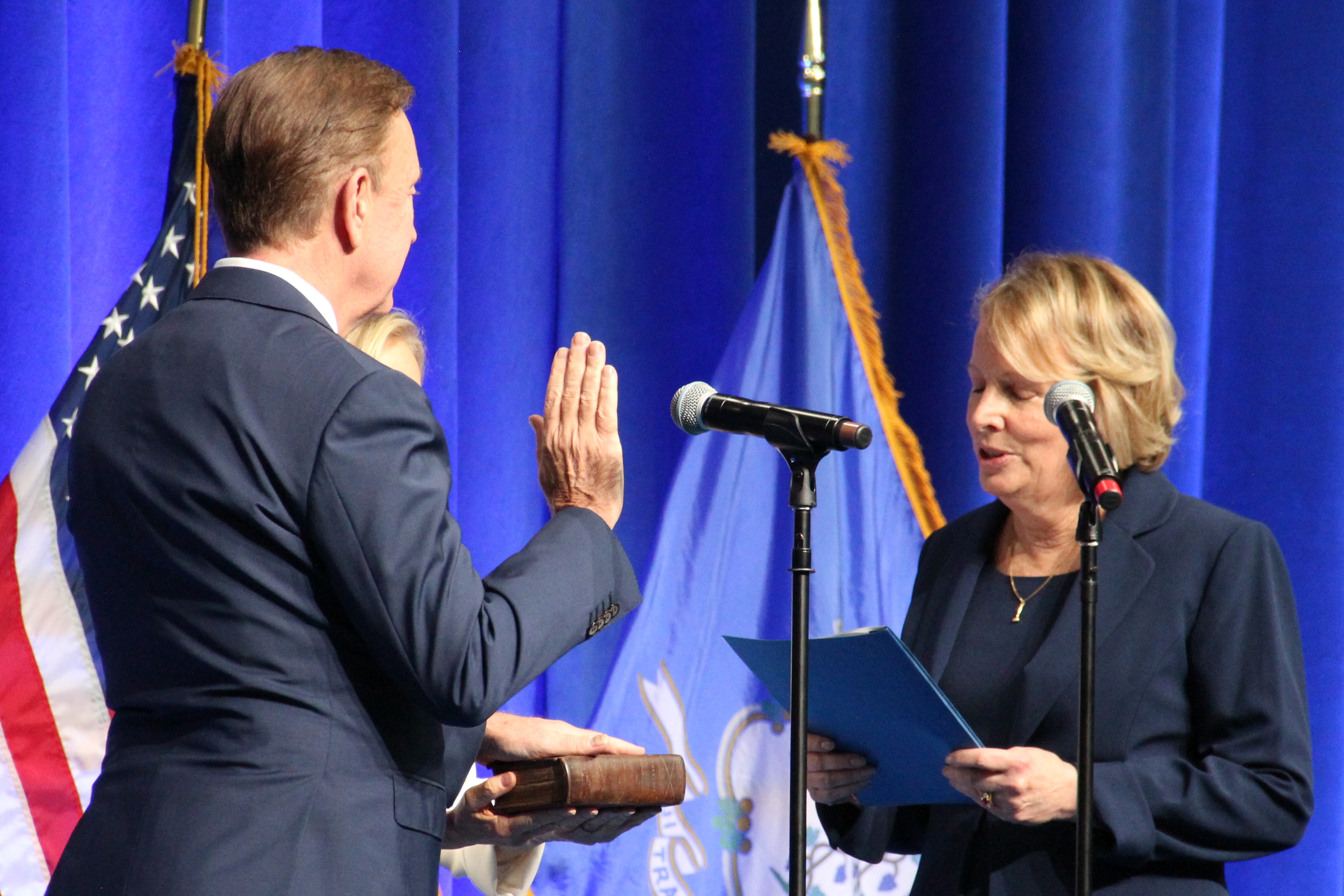
Lamont is sworn into his second term at the State Arsenal and Armony.

Lamont defeated Stefanowski again to win a second term in 2022. His second swearing-in took place on January 4, 2023, at the State Arsenal and Armory, along with Lieutenant Governor Susan Bysiewicz and constitutional officers.

On July 19, 2023, Lamont signed into law a series of bills aimed at protecting reproductive rights and increasing public access to birth control in Connecticut. These included Public Act 23-128, which protects medical providers from receiving "adverse actions" another state may try to enforce. It also protects licensed medical providers from having their licenses revoked, suspended, or denied renewal if they provide reproductive services to patients, including those who come from a state where abortion is illegal.

In June 2025, Lamont vetoed a bill that would have allowed striking workers to receive unemployment assistance. That same month, he vetoed an Omnibus YIMBY bill that would have expanded affordable housing, streamlined permitting for missing middle housing, and legalized transit oriented development. In November 2025, it was revealed that Lamont had asked one of his aides to draft a statement announcing his support for the pro-housing housing legislation just 13 days before he vetoed it. It is unclear why Lamont's views on the legislation changed.

Lamont called the assassination of Charlie Kirk "absolutely awful" and ordered US and state flags in Connecticut lowered to half-staff for him.

=== Approval ratings ===
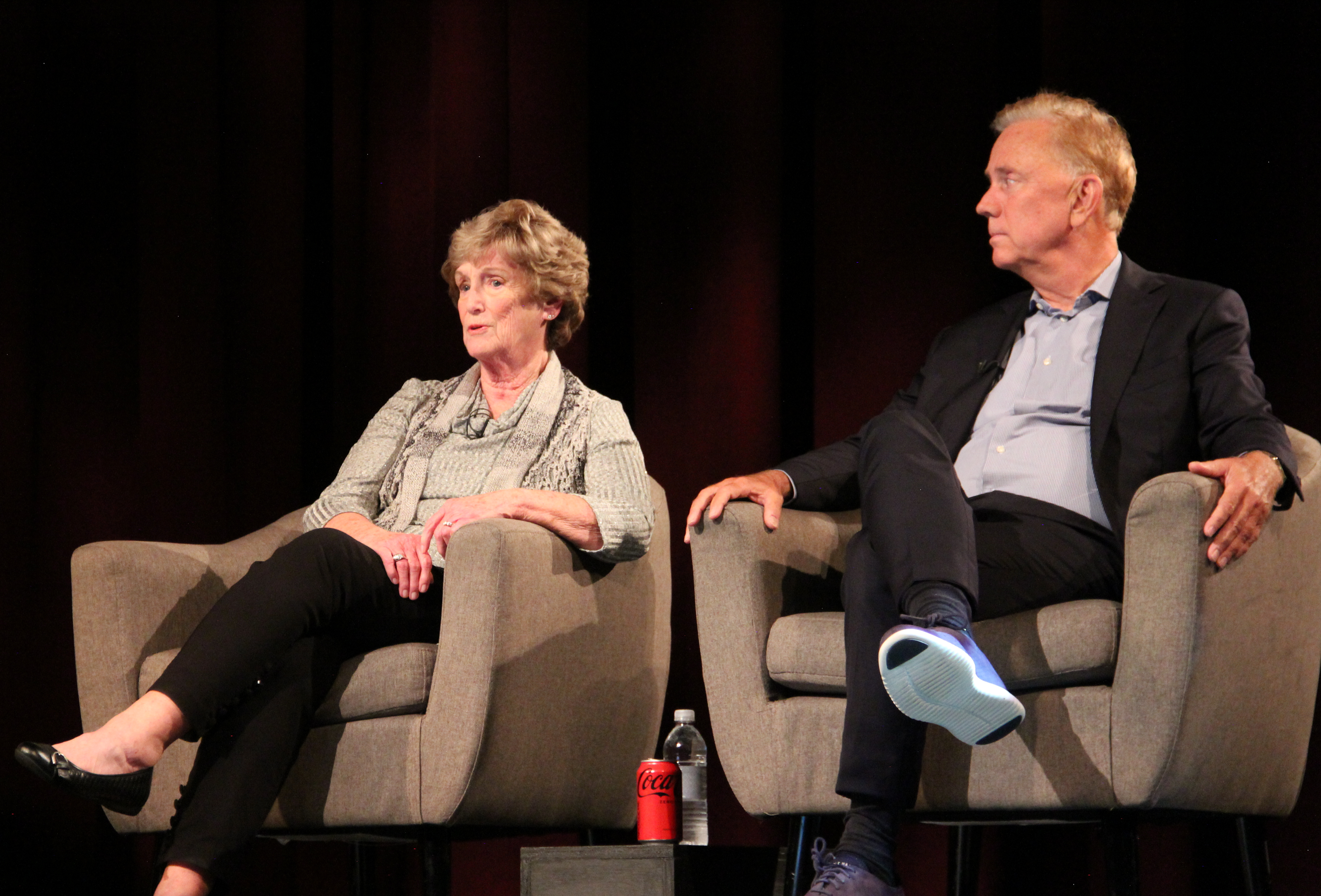
Former governor Jodi Rell with Ned Lamont in 2023.

In his first year as governor, Lamont garnered consistently low approval ratings. Morning Consult had listed him among the ten least popular governors every quarter since his election. In a survey conducted in the last quarter of 2019, he was ranked the fourth most unpopular governor in the country, with a 51% disapproval rating and a 32% approval rating.

Since the pandemic began in 2020, Lamont's approval ratings have been higher. In a May 2020 Quinnipiac poll, he received a 65% approval rating and a 26% disapproval rating, with a 78% approval rating for his handling of the pandemic. By October 2020, a Sacred Heart University survey found his overall approval rating to be 53%, while 71% approved of his handling of the pandemic. In a March 2021 Sacred Heart University poll, 70.7% of people approved of Lamont's handling of the pandemic and his approval stood at nearly 56%, almost double his 28.1% approval from the same pollster in December 2019. In 2022, Lamont had the highest approval rating of any Democratic governor.

== Personal life ==
On September 10, 1983, Lamont married Ann Huntress, a venture capitalist and managing partner at Oak Investment Partners. They have three children. He and his family live in Greenwich and have a vacation home in North Haven, Maine. The Lamont Gallery on the campus of Phillips Exeter Academy and the Lamont Library at Harvard University are both named in honor of his family.

== See also ==
- Electoral history of Ned Lamont

== Notes ==
Party political offices
Preceded by Joe Lieberman	Democratic nominee for U.S. Senator from Connecticut (Class 1); 2006	Succeeded by Chris Murphy
Preceded by Dannel Malloy	Democratic nominee for Governor of Connecticut; 2018, 2022, 2026	Most recent
Political offices
Preceded by Dannel Malloy	Governor of Connecticut; 2019–present	Incumbent
U.S. order of precedence (ceremonial)
Preceded by JD Vance as Vice President	Order of precedence of the United States; Within Connecticut	Succeeded by Mayor of city in which event is held
Preceded by JD Vance as Vice President	Order of precedence of the United States; Within Connecticut	Succeeded by Otherwise Mike Johnson as Speaker of the House
Preceded by Brian Kemp as Governor of Georgia	Order of precedence of the United States; Outside Connecticut	Succeeded by Maura Healey as Governor of Massachusetts
