= Abortion in Connecticut =

Abortion in Connecticut is legal up to the point of fetal viability, or after that if necessary to preserve the life or health (including mental health) of the pregnant individual. A poll by the Pew Research Center found that 67 percent of adults in the state believed that abortion should be legal in all or most cases. The 2023 American Values Atlas reported that, in their most recent survey, 72% of people from Connecticut said that abortion should be legal in all or most cases.

Abortions took place early in the state's history. People at that time talked about abortions using euphemisms. The death of Sarah Grosvenor following unsuccessful abortion resulted in a prosecution in colonial Connecticut. Connecticut became the first state to criminalize abortion after codifying its common law in 1821. Later, such laws were justified as trying to protect the life of the women from bad actors providing unsafe abortion services. The state was one of ten states in 2007 to have a customary informed consent provision for abortions. In 1965, the US Supreme Court heard the case of Griswold v. Connecticut, striking down laws that banned the sale, use of and prescription of contraceptives, even for married couples. The Court's later decision in 1973's Roe v. Wade ruling meant the state could no longer regulate abortion in the first trimester. In 1990, state law was amended to read, "the decision to terminate a pregnancy prior to the viability of the fetus shall be solely that of the pregnant woman in consultation with her physician", the first such law in state codifying the Court's holding in Roe, as it would be later modified by Planned Parenthood v. Casey. The number of abortion clinics in the state has been declining in recent years, going from 46 in 1982 to 43 in 1992 to 21 in 2014. There were 10,625 legal abortions performed in Connecticut in 2014, and 9,888 in 2015. In 1964, Gerri Santoro of Connecticut died trying to obtain an illegal abortion and her photo became the symbol of the pro-choice movement. Abortion rights activists in the state participated in the #StoptheBans movement in May 2019. Anti-abortion rights organizations were created in the state in the late 1960s.

== History ==
Sarah Grosvenor was involved in a colonial court hearing after an unsuccessful abortion resulted in her death. After a seemingly successful surgical abortion performed by Dr. John Hallowell, Grosvenor became sick. She died on September 14, 1742, in her hometown of Pomfret, Connecticut, after surgical complications.

Three years after Grosvenor's death, her case was taken to court. Historians believe the incident came to the attention of the court after years of gossip and rumors. Zerviah and Sarah's friend Abigail Nightingale testified in court, recounting what Grosvenor had confessed to both of them separately from her death bed. The court identified her physician, John Hallowell, and her lover, Amasa Sessions, as responsible for her murder. The court charged the individuals for both putting Sarah into bad health and the attempted abortion, as it was done in an attempt to conceal her pregnancy. The court hearing ended in Amasa's innocence and the conviction of Hallowell with a misdemeanor. The court case did not acknowledge Grosvenor's abortion as murder of the fetus, even though Zerviah had testified that Grosvenor had felt the child move from within her. It has been understood by historians that Amasa was deemed innocent as he had lost his lover and had not performed the operation that resulted in her death. Grosvenor's case has been argued as one of the most well known surgical abortion cases in colonial America.

Abortions took place early in the state's history. People at that time talked about abortions using euphemisms.

=== Legislative history ===
Connecticut was the first state in the nation to make abortion a criminal offense. The state did this by statue in 1821, codifying what was already found in the state's common law, following public outcry of the case of Asenath Smith who had been forced to undergo an abortion by her partner, a preacher. The 1821 Connecticut law targeted apothecaries who sold "poisons" to women for purposes of inducing an abortion, and New York made post-quickening abortions a felony and pre-quickening abortions a misdemeanor in 1829. In the 19th century, bans by state legislatures on abortion were about protecting the life of the mother given the number of deaths caused by abortions; state governments saw themselves as looking out for the lives of their citizens. By 1950, the state legislature would pass a law stating that a woman who had an abortion or actively sought to have an abortion regardless of whether she went through with it were guilty of a criminal offense.

After the Supreme Court struck down the state's ban on the use of contraception in 1965 with Griswold v. Connecticut, which recognized a right to privacy in the "emanations and penumbras" of the Bill of Rights, a large group of women filed suit in federal court for the District of Connecticut to block enforcement of the state's abortion law, which allowed the procedure only when the life of the patient was in danger. The court ruled in their favor in 1972, and after the General Assembly amended the statute to include a preamble stating its purpose in preserving life, it found that insufficient when it reviewed the statute a second time later that year, holding that a fetus is not a person within the meaning of the Fourteenth Amendment.

In the years after Roe made the state's appeal moot, voters began to be perceived as tolerant of abortion. In 1990 Governor William O'Neill, a Catholic who personally opposed abortion, signed the first bill in the nation that codified the terms of Roe (and later Planned Parenthood v. Casey) into state law, saying "the decision to terminate a pregnancy prior to the viability of the fetus shall be solely that of the pregnant woman in consultation with her physician."

The state was one of 10 in 2007 to have a customary informed consent provision for abortions. Connecticut is one of 17 states that use their own funds to cover all or most "medically necessary" abortions sought by low-income women under Medicaid, 13 of which were required by State court orders to do so. In 2017, Washington State, New Mexico, Illinois, Alaska, Maryland, Massachusetts, Connecticut, and New Jersey allow qualified non-physicians to prescribe drugs for medical abortions only.

In May 2019, the state was debating a bill about Crisis Pregnancy Centers (CPCs). The proposed bill would prohibit them from engaging in deceptive advertising. The law was passed in 2021.

In response to the 2021 Texas Heartbeat Act, which allowed private civil suits against anyone performing or facilitating an abortion, even one performed on a Texas resident out of state or from out of state, the General Assembly passed House Bill 5414, signed into law by Governor Ned Lamont in early May 2022. It allows anyone sued under the Texas law or those like it passed in other states over an abortion that took place in whole or part in Connecticut to countersue in Connecticut for the same amount awarded. The state's courts may not issue subpoenas or any orders related to, nor may state government, and all law enforcement, cooperate with, an investigation or prosecution out of state of an abortion that would be legal if performed in Connecticut. The governor is also forbidden from extraditing to another state any resident sought by another state for prosecution under its abortion laws if the act alleged would have been legal in Connecticut. On the medical side, HB 5414 allows advanced practice registered nurses, nurse midwives and physician's assistants to perform suction abortions in addition to medication abortions.

Other states supportive of abortion rights had passed some elements of HB 5414, but Connecticut, according to a law professor whose research had informed the bill, was the first state to do it in one bill and go to great lengths to protect providers. HB 5414 inspired a similar bill in the Council of the District of Columbia, and neighboring New York passed in mid-June a series of similar laws.

=== Judicial history ===
The Connecticut Supreme Court said in 1904, "The public policy that underlies this legislation is based largely on protection due to the woman, protection against her own weakness as well as the criminal list and greed of others. The criminal intent and moral turpitude involved in the violation, by a woman, of the restraint put upon her control over her own person is widely different than that which attends the man who, in clear violation of the law, and for pay and gain of any kind, inflicts an injury on the body of a woman endangering health and perhaps life."

The US Supreme Court's decision in 1973's Roe v. Wade ruling meant the state could no longer regulate abortion in the first trimester. However, the Supreme Court overturned Roe v. Wade in Dobbs v. Jackson Women's Health Organization, No. 19-1392, 597 U.S. ___ (2022) later in 2022.

=== Clinic history ===
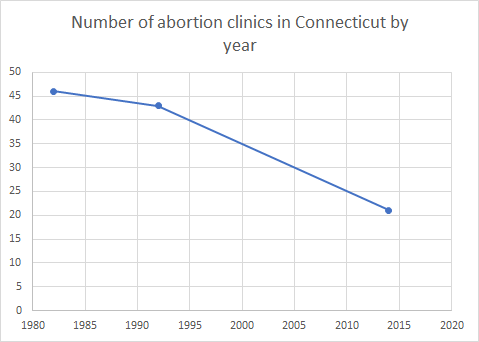
Number of abortion clinics in Connecticut by year

Between 1982 and 1992, the number of abortion clinics in the state decreased by 3, going from 46 in 1982 to 43 in 1992. In 2014, there were 21 abortion clinics in the state. In 2014, 15% of the counties in the state did not have an abortion clinic. That year, 5% of women in the state aged 15–44 lived in a county without an abortion clinic. In March 2016, there were 17 Planned Parenthood clinics in the state. In 2017, there were 17 Planned Parenthood clinics, of which 17 offered abortion services, in a state with a population of 812,634 women aged 15–49.

== Statistics ==
In the period between 1972 and 1974, there were zero recorded illegal abortion deaths in the state. In 1990, 443,000 women in the state faced the risk of an unintended pregnancy. In 2014, 67% of adults said in a poll by the Pew Research Center that abortion should be legal in all or most cases. In 2017, the state had an infant mortality rate of 4.5 deaths per 1,000 live births.

Number of reported abortions, abortion rate and percentage change in rate by geographic region and state in 1992, 1995 and 1996
Census division and state	Number			Rate			% change 1992–1996
Census division and state	1992	1995	1996	1992	1995	1996	% change 1992–1996
Total	1,528,930	1,363,690	1,365,730	25.9	22.9	22.9	–12
New England	78,360	71,940	71,280	25.2	23.6	23.5	–7
Connecticut	19,720	16,680	16,230	26.2	23	22.5	–14
Maine	4,200	2,690	2,700	14.7	9.6	9.7	–34
Massachusetts	40,660	41,190	41,160	28.4	29.2	29.3	3
New Hampshire	3,890	3,240	3,470	14.6	12	12.7	–13
Rhode Island	6,990	5,720	5,420	30	25.5	24.4	–19

Number, rate, and ratio of reported abortions, by reporting area of residence and occurrence and by percentage of abortions obtained by out-of-state residents, US CDC estimates
Location	Residence			Occurrence			% obtained by out-of-state residents	Year	Ref
Location	No.	Rate^	Ratio^^	No.	Rate^	Ratio^^	% obtained by out-of-state residents	Year	Ref
Connecticut				19,720	26.2			1992	
Connecticut				16,680	23			1995	
Connecticut				16,230	22.5			1996	
Connecticut	10,625	15.5	293	10,611	15.5	292	2.6	2014	
Connecticut	9,888	14.5	277	9,938	14.6	278	2.7	2015	
Connecticut	9,954	14.8	276	10,031	14.9	279	2.9	2016	
^number of abortions per 1.000 women aged 15–44; ^^number of abortions per 1,000 live births

== Deaths as a result of illegal abortions ==
In 1964, Gerri Santoro of Connecticut died trying to obtain an illegal abortion and her photo became the symbol of the pro-choice movement. A photo of her dead body was published in April 1973 in Ms. magazine, making her death a rallying cry for many in the abortion rights movement.

== Abortion rights views and activities ==
=== Protests ===
Women from the state participated in marches supporting abortion rights as part of a #StoptheBans movement in May 2019.

Following the overturn of Roe v. Wade on June 24, 2022, thousands protested in New Haven, Connecticut. On the same day over a hundred abortion rights protesters gathered in downtown Stamford and the New Milford Town Green.

== Anti-abortion activities and views ==
=== Activism ===
In 1965, a Supreme Court decision in Griswold v. Connecticut set a precedent for an expansive right to privacy in the area of reproductive healthcare. In the late 1960s, in response to nationwide abortion-rights efforts, a number of organizations were formed to mobilize opinion against the legalization of abortion.

=== Organizations ===
Family Institute of Connecticut, an interdenominational, conservative tax-exempt nonprofit organization whose stated goal is to encourage and strengthen the family as the foundation of society and to promote Judeo-Christian ethical and moral values in the culture and government of Connecticut.
