= Sioux Falls Skyforce seasons =

This is a complete list of seasons for the Sioux Falls Skyforce.

Continental Basketball Association

Year	GP	W	L	Pct.	Finish	Playoffs
1989–90	56	20	36	.357	3rd, NC Midwest	Out of Playoffs
1990–91	56	26	30	.464	3rd, AC Midwest	Out of Playoffs
1991–92	56	24	32	.429	4th, NC Northern	Out of Playoffs
1992–93	56	26	30	.464	3rd, NC Midwest	Out of Playoffs
1993–94	56	24	32	.429	5th, NC Midwest	Out of Playoffs
1994–95	56	34	22	.607	2nd, NC Western	Lost First Round (Omaha, 2–1)
1995–96	56	32	24	.571	1st, NC Northern	Won Round 1 (Oklahoma City); Won NC Championship (Florida, 3–2); Won CBA Championship (Fort Wayne, 3–2)
1996–97	56	47	9	.839	1st, National	Lost First Round (Omaha, 3–2)
1997–98	56	31	25	.554	2nd, National	Won Round 1 (Yakima, 3–2); Won Conference Finals (Fort Wayne, 3–0); Lost CBA Championship (Quad City, 3–4)
1998–99	56	32	24	.571	1st, National	Won Round 1 (Idaho, 3–2); Won NC Championship (Quad City, 3–2); Lost CBA Finals (Connecticut, 4–1)
1999–00	56	30	26	.536	3rd, National	Won Round 1 (Connecticut); Lost Semifinals (La Crosse)
2000–01	23	8	15	.348	5th, National	Out of Playoffs

International Basketball League

Year	GP	W	L	Pct.	Finish	Playoffs
2000–01	30	16	14	.533	3rd, Western	Lost Round 1 (Rockford)

Continental Basketball Association

Year	GP	W	L	Pct.	Finish	Playoffs
2001–02	56	33	23	.589	2nd, American	Lost Semifinals (Rockford)
2002–03	48	17	31	.354	4th, National	Out of Playoffs
2003–04	48	23	25	.479	5th, League	Out of Playoffs
2004–05	48	31	17	.646	2nd, Western	Won Semifinals (Dakota); Won Championship (Rockford)
2005–06	48	30	18	.625	2nd, Western	Lost Round-Robin Tournament (0–2)

NBA D-League

Year	GP	W	L	Pct.	Finish	Playoffs
2006–07	50	30	20	.600	2nd, Eastern	Lost Conference Finals (Dakota)
2007–08	50	28	22	.560	2nd, Central	Won Round 1 (Dakota); Lost Semifinals (Austin)
2008–09	50	25	25	.500	4th, Central	Out of Playoffs
