= Stephen L. Baker =

American business writer

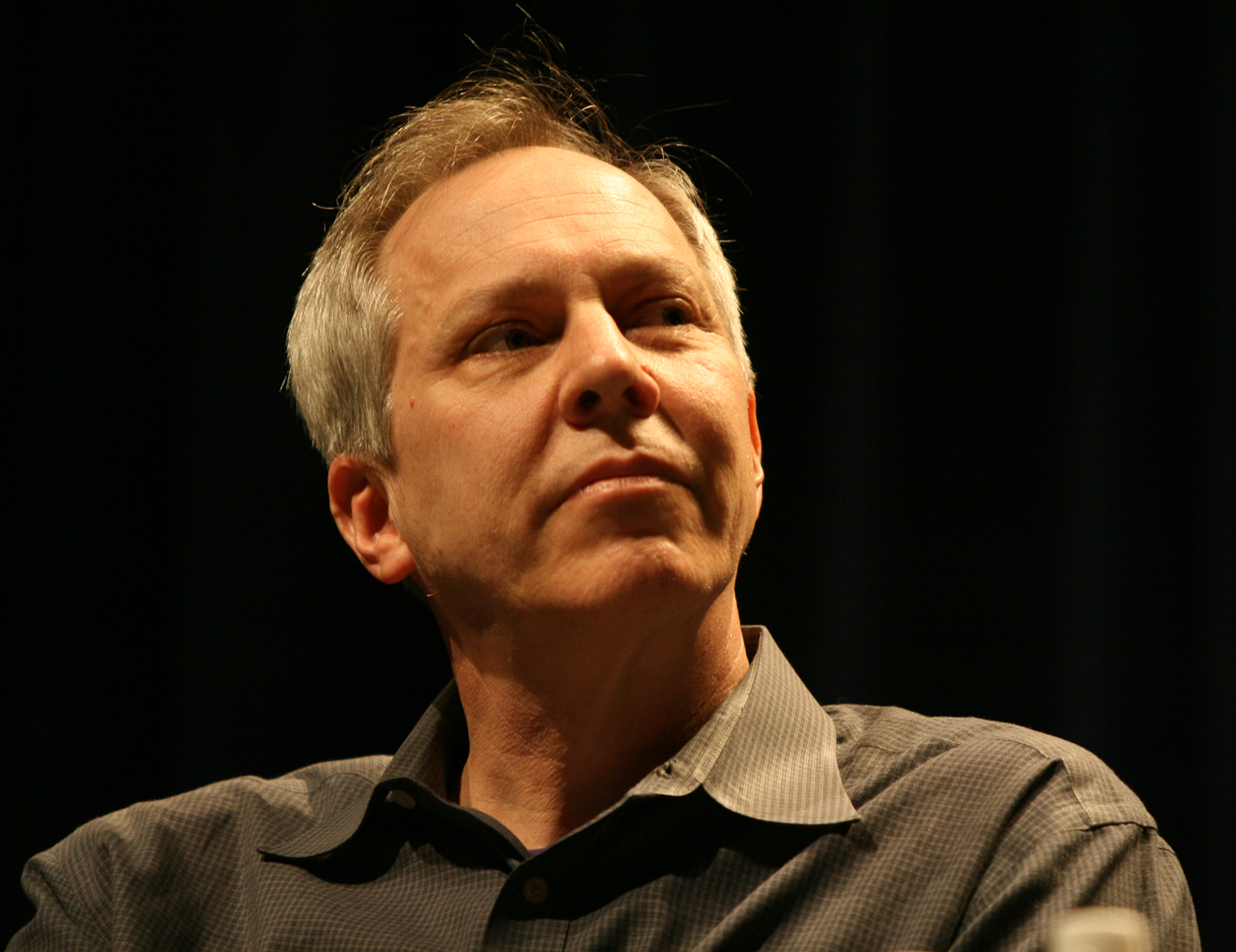
- Baker at South by Southwest, 2009
- Education: Harriton High School
- Alma mater: University of Wisconsin–Madison, Columbia University
- Writing career
- Genre: non-fiction
- Notable works: Final Jeopardy: Man vs. Machine and the Quest to Know Everything, Where Does it Hurt? An Entrepreneur’s Guide to Fixing Health Care
- Website: www.theboost.us

Stephen L. Baker is an American journalist, non-fiction author, and novelist. He wrote for BusinessWeek for 23 years from the United States, Europe and Latin America. His first non-fiction book, The Numerati, published in 2008, discussed the rise of the data economy. Themes concerning data have marked much of his subsequent work, including his futuristic novel, The Boost (2014).

== Early life ==
Baker grew up in Rosemont, Pennsylvania, a suburb of Philadelphia. He attended Harriton High School and the University of Wisconsin–Madison, where he majored in Spanish and History. He attended the University of Madrid in Spain during his junior year. He later received a master's degree in Journalism from Columbia University in New York.

== Journalism ==
Baker began his professional career at the Black River Tribune, a weekly newspaper in Ludlow, Vermont. After working in Venezuela and Ecuador, he spent a year at the El Paso (Texas) Herald-Post. A year later he was BusinessWeek's bureau chief in Mexico City. From Mexico he moved to Pittsburgh, Pennsylvania, where he covered industry for six years, and then to Paris, France, where he covered European technology.

Baker has also written for the New York Times, the Wall Street Journal, the Los Angeles Times, and the Boston Globe. In 1992 he received the Overseas Press Club Morton Frank Award, given for best business reporting from abroad in magazines, for his portrait of the rising Mexican auto industry.

== Books ==
Baker’s BusinessWeek 2006 cover story on data, Math Will Rock Your World, was the source for his first published book, The Numerati, published by Houghton Mifflin Harcourt in 2008. It described how people would be understood and predicted as workers, shoppers, voters, patients, and potential terrorists. The book was translated into 20 languages.

In early 2011, Houghton Mifflin published Baker's Final Jeopardy: Man vs. Machine and the Quest to Know Everything, which follows IBM's development of Watson, an artificial intelligence computer system designed to play against humans in the television game show Jeopardy!.

He co-wrote, with Jonathan Bush, the 2014 book Where Does it Hurt? An Entrepreneur’s Guide to Fixing Health Care. It reached the New York Times Best-seller List in June 2014.

His 2014 novel, The Boost, takes place in 2072, a time in which practically everyone on earth carries a cognitive chip, or "boost," implanted in the brain. Kirkus Reviews reviews called it a "techno-thriller with deep, dark roots in the present."

== Personal ==
Baker resides in Montclair, New Jersey, with his wife, Jalaire Craver. They have three adult sons, Jack, Aidan and Henry.
