= Sioux Falls Skyforce =

American professional basketball team of the NBA G League

- Conference: Western
- League: NBA G League
- Founded: 1989
- History: Sioux Falls Skyforce; 1989–present CBA: 1989–2000; 2001–2006; IBL: 2000–2001; NBA D-League/G League: 2006–present
- Arena: Sanford Pentagon
- Location: Sioux Falls, South Dakota
- Team colors: Red, black, yellow
- Team manager: Jeremy DeCurtins
- Head coach: Mario Casamajor
- Ownership: Miami Heat (Micky Arison); Heineman family (Managing Partner)
- Affiliation: Miami Heat
- Championships: 2 CBA (1996, 2005); 1 NBA D-League (2016)
- Conference titles: 4 CBA (1996, 1998, 1999, 2005); 1 NBA D-League (2016)
- Division titles: 1 CBA (1996); 2 NBA D-League (2015, 2016)
- Website: siouxfalls.gleague.nba.com

The Sioux Falls Skyforce are an American professional basketball team in the NBA G League based in Sioux Falls, South Dakota. They are affiliated with the Miami Heat, and play their home games at the Sanford Pentagon. The Sioux Falls Skyforce are the longest-running minor-league basketball team in the United States.

The Skyforce began in the Continental Basketball Association (CBA) in 1989, playing its home games at Sioux Falls Arena from then until the move to the Pentagon in 2013. It participated in four CBA championship finals, winning the championship trophy in 1996 (defeating the Fort Wayne Fury, four games to one) and 2005 (defeating the Rockford Lightning three games to one).

== History ==
The team's name was chosen from two entries in a contest to name the team in 1989 which yielded 1,045 suggestions. The names "Sky" and "Force" were combined to create the "Skyforce".

The Skyforce also hosted the CBA All-Star Game three times: in 1996, 2000, and 2003.

In 2006, the Skyforce joined the D-League. In its first two seasons in the D-League, it was a playoff contender. In 2009, the team suffered a 2–1 series loss in the first round to the Tulsa 66ers. In 2014, it fared a bit better, sweeping the Canton Charge in the first round before being swept by the eventual champion Fort Wayne Mad Ants in the semifinals. In 2016, the Skyforce won its first D-League championship, defeating the Los Angeles D-Fenders 2 games to 1. The Skyforce also finished the 2016 season 40–10, the winningest regular season record in D-League history.

On June 10, 2013, the Miami Heat announced that it had entered into a single affiliation partnership with the Skyforce, beginning with the 2013–14 season. The Miami Heat signature red/yellow color scheme was adopted into the Skyforce's jerseys, logo, and merchandise following this announcement. On June 1, 2017, the Heat purchased a controlling interest in the Skyforce with the Heineman family retaining its minority share. The former ownership group of Bob Correa, Greg Heineman, Roger Larsen, and Tom Walsh had purchased the Skyforce from the Kemper Lesnik Organization in May 1993.

== Year-by-year record ==
Season	League	Conference	Division	Finish	Wins	Losses	Pct.	Postseason results
Sioux Falls Skyforce
1989–90	CBA	National	Midwest	3rd	20	36	.357	
1990–91	CBA	American	Midwest	3rd	26	30	.464	
1991–92	CBA	National	Northern	4th	24	32	.429	
1992–93	CBA	National	Midwest	3rd	26	30	.464	
1993–94	CBA	National	Midwest	3rd	24	32	.429	
1994–95	CBA	National	Western	2nd	34	22	.607	Lost First Round (Omaha) 1–2
1995–96	CBA	National	Northern	1st	32	24	.571	Won First Round (Oklahoma City) 3–1; Won Conf. Championship (Florida) 3–2; Won CBA Championship (Fort Wayne) 3–2
1996–97	CBA	National		1st	47	9	.839	Lost First Round (Omaha) 2–3
1997–98	CBA	National		2nd	31	25	.554	Won Semifinals (Yakima) 3–2; Won Conf. Championship (Fort Wayne) 3–0; Lost CBA Championship (Quad City) 3–4
1998–99	CBA	National		1st	32	24	.571	Won First Round (Idaho) 3–2; Won Conf. Championship (Quad City) 3–2; Lost CBA Championship (Connecticut) 1–4
1999–00	CBA	National		3rd	30	26	.536	Won First Round (Connecticut) 109–90; Lost Semifinals (La Crosse) 90–99
2000–01 (Note: The CBA folded in the middle of the 2000–01 season.)	CBA	National		5th	8	15	.348	
2000–01	IBL	Western		3rd	16	14	.533	Lost First Round (Rockford) 91–111
2001–02	CBA	American		2nd	33	23	.589	Lost Semifinals (Rockford) 1–3
2002–03	CBA	National		4th	17	31	.354	
2003–04	CBA			5th	23	25	.479	
2004–05	CBA	Western		2nd	31	17	.646	Won Semifinals (Dakota) 3–2; Won CBA Championship (Rockford) 3–1
2005–06	CBA	Western		2nd	30	18	.625	Lost round-robin tournament 0–2
2006–07	D-League		Eastern	2nd	30	20	.600	Won Division Semifinals (Fort Worth) 128–105; Lost Division Finals (Dakota) 113–115
2007–08	D-League		Central	2nd	28	22	.560	Won First Round (Dakota) 101–89; Lost Semifinals (Austin) 93–99
2008–09	D-League		Central	4th	25	25	.500	
2009–10	D-League	Eastern		2nd	32	18	.640	Lost First Round (Tulsa) 1–2
2010–11	D-League	Eastern		7th	10	40	.200	
2011–12	D-League	Eastern		7th	15	35	.292	
2012–13	D-League		Central	4th	25	25	.500	
2013–14	D-League		Central	2nd	31	19	.620	Won First Round (Canton) 2–1; Lost Semifinals (Fort Wayne) 0–2
2014–15	D-League	Eastern	Central	1st	29	21	.580	Lost First Round (Canton) 1–2
2015–16	D-League	Eastern	Central	1st	40	10	.800	Won Quarterfinals (Westchester) 2–0; Won Semifinals(Canton) 2–0; Won D-League Championship (Los Angeles) 2–1
2016–17	D-League	Western	Southwest	3rd	29	21	.580	
2017–18	G League	Western	Midwest	2nd	25	25	.500	
2018–19	G League	Western	Midwest	3rd	24	26	.480	
2019–20	G League	Western	Midwest	2nd	22	20	.524	Season cancelled by COVID-19 pandemic
2020–21	G League	Opted out of single-site season						
2021–22	G League	Western	–	12th	14	21	.400	
2022–23	G League	Western	–	5th	20	12	.625	Won Quarterfinals (Salt Lake) 115–107; Won Semifinals (Stockton) 98–97; Lost Conference Finals (Rio Grande Valley) 105–110
2023–24	G League	Western	–	2nd	22	12	.647	Lost Semifinals (Oklahoma City) 93–111
2024–25	G League	Western	–	8th	18	16	.529	
2025–26	G League	Western	–	9th	18	18	.500	
Regular season					941	812	.537	1989–2026
Playoffs					50	46	.521	1989–2025

== Head coaches ==
#	Head coach	Term	Regular season				Playoffs				Achievements
#	Head coach	Term	G	W	L	Win%	G	W	L	Win%	Achievements
1	Nate Tibbetts	2007–2009	100	53	47	.530	2	1	1	.500	
2	Tony Fritz	2009–2010	50	32	18	.640	3	1	2	.333	
3	Mo McHone	2010–2012	100	25	75	.250	—	—	—	—	
4	Joel Abelson	2012–2013	50	25	25	.500	—	—	—	—	
5	Pat Delany	2013–2014	50	31	19	.620	5	2	3	.400	
6	Phil Weber	2014–2015	50	29	21	.580	3	1	2	.333	
7	Dan Craig	2015–2016	50	40	10	.800	7	6	1	.857	NBA D-League Finals Champion: 2016; NBA D-League Coach of the Year: 2016; NBA D-League All-Star Game coach: 2016
8	Nevada Smith	2016–2019	150	78	72	.520	—	—	—	—	
9	Eric Glass	2019–2020	42	22	20	.524	—	—	—	—	
10	Kasib Powell	2021–2024	67	34	33	.507	3	2	1	.667	
11	Dan Bisaccio	2024–2026	34	18	16	.529	0	0	0	–	
12	Mario Casamajor	2026–present				–				–	

== Current roster ==
Sioux Falls Skyforce roster
Players

Pos.	No.	Player	Height	Weight	DOB	From
G	4	Cam Carter	6 ft 3 in (1.91 m)	190 lb (86 kg)	2003-03-17	LSU
F	42	Dain Dainja	6 ft 9 in (2.06 m)	255 lb (116 kg)	2002-07-16	Memphis
G	–	Tre Donaldson (TW)	6 ft 2 in (1.88 m)	210 lb (95 kg)	2003-12-11	Miami (FL)
C	50	Vladislav Goldin (TW)	7 ft 0 in (2.13 m)	250 lb (113 kg)	2001-05-12	Michigan
F	–	Keshad Johnson (TW)	6 ft 7 in (2.01 m)	225 lb (102 kg)	2001-06-23	Arizona
F/C	20	Nathan Missia-Dio	6 ft 10 in (2.08 m)	223 lb (101 kg)	2004-11-17	Belgium
F	2	Steve Settle III	6 ft 10 in (2.08 m)	190 lb (86 kg)	2001-02-20	Temple
G	26	Dennis Smith Jr.	6 ft 2 in (1.88 m)	205 lb (93 kg)	1997-11-25	NC State
G	0	Blaise Threatt	6 ft 3 in (1.91 m)	210 lb (95 kg)	2000-09-08	Weber State

Coaches
Head coach
- Mario Casamajor
Assistant(s)
- Keita Bates-Diop
- Herman Mandole
- Ryan McAdoo
- Therian Williams
- Nate Wilson

Legend
- (DP) Unsigned draft pick
- (FA) Free agent
- (S) Suspended
- (P) Prospects
- (NBA) On assignment from NBA affiliate
- (TW) Two-way affiliate player
- Injured

Roster
Updated: March 10, 2026

== NBA affiliates ==
- Miami Heat (2013–present)

== See also ==
- Sioux Falls Skyforce seasons

== Sources ==
- Sioux Falls Skyforce Media Guide (PDF) - Historical stats
