= The Numerati =

2008 book by Stephen L. Baker

- Author: Stephen L. Baker
- Subject: automatic identification and data capture
- Genre: Nonfiction
- Publication date: 2008

The Numerati is a 2008 non-fiction book written by Stephen L. Baker on the subjects of automatic identification and data capture and Big Data.

== Description ==
In The Numerati Baker interviews people who are studying, developing and implementing the technologies and techniques used to capture and analyze many of our everyday actions as we communicate, travel and make purchases. He explains how the initial goal of this data capture and analysis is typically to identify sets of characteristics, which makes it easier to manage the billions of data points (see "Big data") these sets may contain. As these characteristics are grouped, it is hoped that the members of each group can be better understood. This information can then be used, with varying but often increased success, in early incident detection, to predict outcomes, project the effect of stimulus on the groups and, in many cases, to influence group members' behavior.
