= Electoral history of Ned Lamont =

Elections featuring Governor of Connecticut

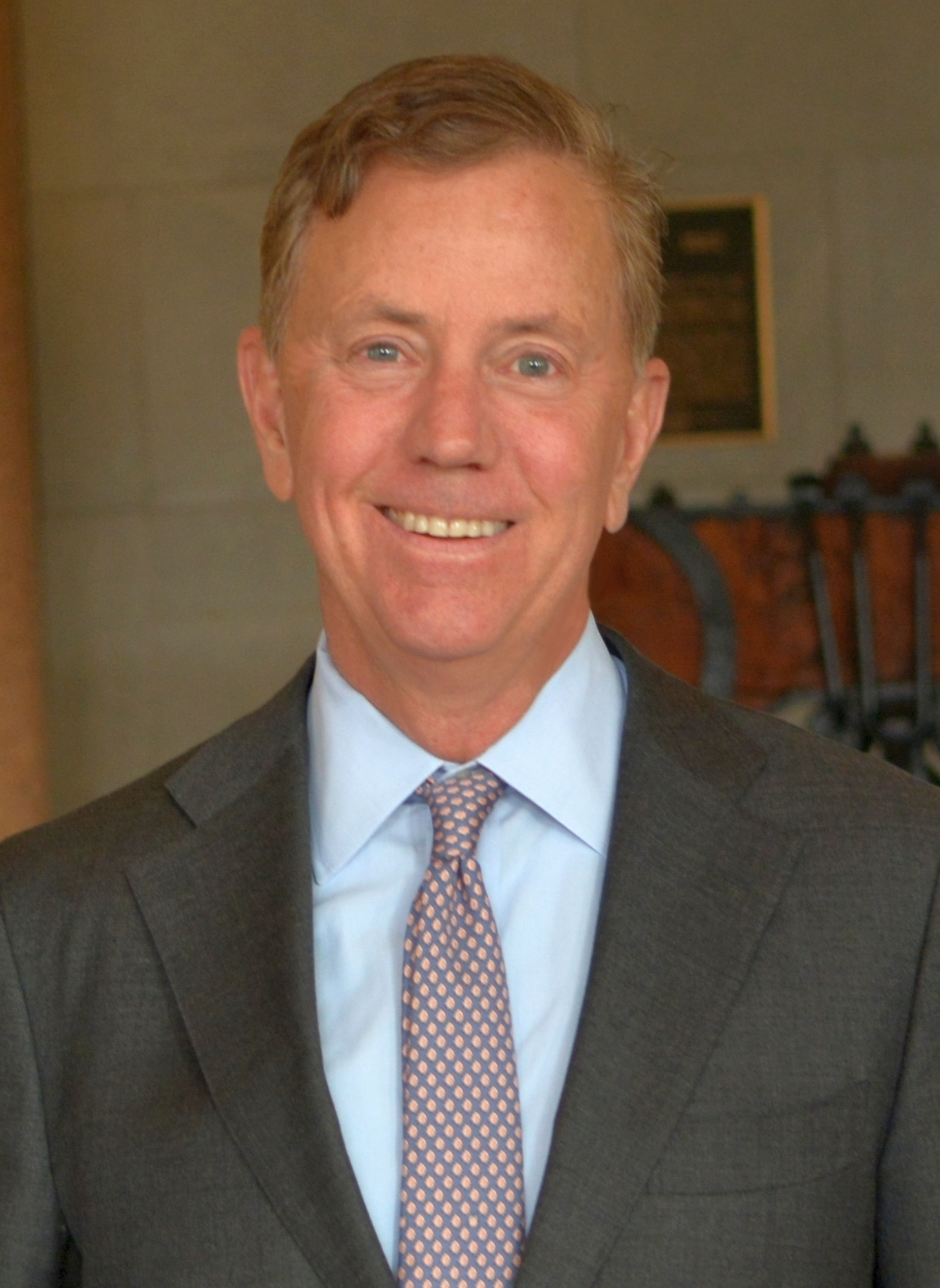
Governor Ned Lamont

This is the electoral history of Ned Lamont, the 89th and current governor of Connecticut. He previously ran for governor in 2010, and was the Democratic candidate for the United States Senate in 2006.

== Connecticut State Senate election ==
=== 1990 ===
1990 Connecticut State Senate election, 36th district
Party	Candidate	Votes	%
Republican	William Nickerson	12,588	42.88
A Connecticut Party	Emil Benvenuto (incumbent)	9,488	32.32
Democratic	Ned Lamont	7,278	24.79
Majority		3,100	10.56
Turnout		29,354	
Republican gain from A Connecticut Party			

== U.S. Senate election ==
=== 2006 ===
2006 State Democratic Convention results
Party	Candidate	Votes	%
Democratic	Joe Lieberman (incumbent)	1,004	66.53
Democratic	Ned Lamont (Note: Lamont surpassed the minimum threshold of 15% to appear on the primary ballot.)	505	33.47
Total votes		1,509	100.0

2006 U.S. Senate Democratic primary election in Connecticut
Party	Candidate	Votes	%
Democratic	Ned Lamont	146,587	51.8
Democratic	Joe Lieberman (incumbent)	136,468	48.2
Total votes		283,055	100.0

2006 U.S. Senate election in Connecticut
Party	Candidate	Votes	%
Connecticut for Lieberman	Joe Lieberman (incumbent)	564,095	49.7
Democratic	Ned Lamont	450,844	39.7
Republican	Alan Schlesinger	109,198	9.6
Green	Ralph Ferrucci	5,922	0.6
Concerned Citizens	Timothy Knibbs	4,638	0.4
Write-in	Carl E. Vassar	80	0.0
Majority		113,251	10.0
Turnout		1,134,777	
Connecticut for Lieberman gain from Democratic			

== Connecticut gubernatorial elections ==
=== 2010 ===
2010 State Democratic Convention results
Party	Candidate	Votes	%
Democratic	Dannel Malloy	1,232	67.91
Democratic	Ned Lamont (Note: Lamont surpassed the minimum threshold of 15% to appear on the primary ballot.)	582	32.08
Total votes		1,814	100.0

2010 Democratic primary results
Party	Candidate	Votes	%
Democratic	Dannel Malloy	103,154	57.01
Democratic	Ned Lamont	77,772	42.99
Total votes		180,926	100.0

=== 2018 ===
2018 State Democratic Convention results
Party	Candidate	Votes	%
Democratic	Ned Lamont	1,637	87.03
Democratic	Joe Ganim	244	12.97
Total votes		1,814	100.0

2018 Democratic primary results
Party	Candidate	Votes	%
Democratic	Ned Lamont	172,024	81.2
Democratic	Joe Ganim (Note: While Ganim did not meet the minimum threshold of 15% at the convention, he gathered enough signatures to appear on the primary ballot.)	39,913	18.8
Total votes		211,937	100.0

2018 Connecticut gubernatorial election
Party	Candidate	Votes	%
Democratic	Ned Lamont	694,694	49.38
Republican	Bob Stefanowski	650,113	46.21
Independent	Oz Griebel	54,705	3.89
Libertarian	Rod Hanscomb	6,079	0.43
Total votes		1,356,096	100.0
Democratic hold			

=== 2022 ===
2022 Connecticut gubernatorial election
Party	Candidate	Votes	%
Democratic	Ned Lamont	710,186	56.97
Republican	Bob Stefanowski	546,209	43.05
Independent	Robert Hotaling	12,400	0.98
Green	Michelle Louise Bicking (write-in)	98	0.0%
Total votes		1,268,893	100.0
Democratic hold			
