= Dan Bisaccio =

American basketball coach

Personal information
- Born: Bennington, Vermont, U.S.

Career information
- High school: Mount Anthony Union
- College: Clarkson University (2008-2011); Emerson College (2011-2012)
- Coaching career: 2012–present

Career history

Coaching
- 2012-2014: Marquette (graduate assistant)
- 2014–2015: Miami Heat (video intern)
- 2015–2019: Miami Heat (assistant video coordinator)
- 2019–2023: Miami Heat (video coordinator)
- 2024–2026: Sioux Falls Skyforce

== Early life and college career ==
Bisaccio attended Mount Anthony Union High School in Bennington, Vermont. He played college basketball for Clarkson University. During this time, Bisaccio shifted his interest from playing to coaching. This led him to attending Emerson College, a school that has produced NBA executives like Sam Presti, Rob Hennigan, and Will Dawkins.

== Coaching career ==
After finishing his playing career and graduating from Emerson College, Bisaccio spent two seasons at Marquette University as a graduate assistant. Living right down the street, Bisaccio would frequently attend Milwaukee Bucks home games, hoping to give his elevator pitch to opponents visiting Milwaukee. One of those teams Bisaccio came in contact with was the Miami Heat. After finishing at Marquette, Bisaccio was searching for a new job with the New York Knicks. During that time, he received a call from Miami offering him a position as the team's video intern.

After the 2014-2015 season, Bisaccio spent four seasons as the assistant video coordinator. In 2019 he was promoted to video coordinator, a position he held until 2023. During his time with the Heat, Bisaccio earned the nickname "10-day" because of his work ethic.

In the summer of 2024, Bisaccio served as the 2024 NBA Summer League head coach for the Miami Heat. He helped the Heat win the Summer League Championship, defeating the Memphis Grizzlies 120-118 in overtime.

On July 16, 2024, Bisaccio was named head coach of the Skyforce.

On September 17, 2026, it was reported that Bisaccio would be transitioning back to a role on Erik Spoelstra's staff with the Miami Heat.
