= Janet Peckinpaugh =

American politician

Janet Peckinpaugh (born 1950) is an American television anchor, reporter, business owner, and two-time political candidate in Connecticut.

== Personal life ==
Peckinpaugh was born in Muncie, Indiana and grew up in Canton, Ohio. Her father was a small business owner. She had a brief marriage during college that ended in divorce. Peckinpaugh married Elliot Gerson in 1987 and their son Alex was born in 1988. That marriage ended in divorce in 1993.

== Television career ==
After college Peckinpaugh worked briefly for National Airlines. She moved to Washington, D.C. and was a staffer for Senator Richard Stone (D) FL before starting her television career. In 1978 she moved to Richmond, VA and started her career at WWBT-TV as a weather anchor and news reporter. In 1981, she crossed the street to work at WXEX as a co-anchor. Three months later the other stations in the market also had female co-anchors and all the on-air people had contracts. Peckinpaugh's agent Ken Lindner landed a job for her at WTNH in 1984. News of her arrival made it to the front page of The Hartford Courant, and she quickly became a popular figure in Connecticut and in television. In 1987, Peckinpaugh moved to Channel 3 WFSB, based in Hartford. She was a successful evening news anchor with a six figure salary. In 1995, Peckinpaugh's contract was breached when she was taken off the 6pm news. She left at the end of her contract and filed a discrimination lawsuit for breach of contract, oral and written, sex discrimination (her news director said two women could not anchor together when he took her off both the noon and 5:30 news with Gayle King in 1995 and replaced her with a much younger man) and age discrimination. Peckinpaugh won the multimillion-dollar lawsuit against the Washington Post Company on all counts except age discrimination. Peckinpaugh worked as an anchor for WVIT from 1995 until her retirement in December, 2006. Peckinpaugh is still regarded as a popular figure and is said to have been one of the most well-known TV anchors in Connecticut, with name recognition somewhere between 80 and 90 percent in Connecticut. During her career, she interviewed four U.S. presidents.

== Post-television career ==
After leaving NBC, Peckinpaugh started a media marketing business in Essex, CT. The business, Peckinpaugh Media Group, was designed to advise, guide, and create media productions, such as commercials, for various businesses. She is also a realtor with William Pitt Sotheby's International Realty in Essex, and writes a weekly real estate column for the Shoreline Times. Peckinpaugh served as the marketing director for her friend Lisa Wilson-Foley’s LW Holdings.

=== Political career ===
In the early months of 2010 Peckinpaugh took an interest in politics when her good friend, Wilson-Foley, decided to run for Lieutenant Governor. Peckinpaugh was her campaign manager through the Republican Convention. She entered the political arena herself as a candidate for Congress from the 2nd district just a few weeks before the Convention but picked up enough votes to wage a primary. Peckinpaugh is a fiscal moderate and social liberal. Until the August primary, Peckinpaugh focused on meeting voters, raising money, and visiting all of the towns in the district. She quickly became a popular Republican candidate. On August 10, she defeated Daria Novak and Doug Dubitsky to become the Republican nominee. She was the only political candidate in Connecticut to beat the party-endorsed candidate. Following the primary, she went on to challenge the two-term incumbent, Democrat Joe Courtney. Peckinpaugh lost the 2010 vote on November 2. In January 2011, she declared her candidacy for the Connecticut House of Representatives to fill a vacancy in a February special election. The seat she ran for had been vacated by Democrat Jamie Spallone. She ran a very strong campaign against Essex four term, first selectman Phil Miller, and lost by 80 votes.

== Charitable work ==
Peckinpaugh has always been very active in charities in Connecticut. She has served on the Board of Directors for the Girl Scouts of Connecticut Girl Scouts, the CT Women's Hall of Fame, the Hartford Art School at the University of Hartford and the Hartford Ballet among others. She has been a Corporator for Children's Hospital and was a fellow for the former Calhoun College at Yale University. Currently she serves on the Planning and Zoning Commission in Madison, CT. She was Chair of the Economic Development Commission for Essex for a decade and was on the Board of Governors at the Essex Yacht Club.
