= Conservation Services Group =

US nonprofit energy company

- Type: Nonprofit
- Industry: Energy efficiency and renewable energy
- Founded: 1984 in Boston, United States
- Founder: Social entrepreneurs
- Fate: Acquired by CLEAResult
- Area served: USA
- Key people: Steve Thomas, Steve Cowell

Conservation Services Group (CSG) is a nonprofit energy efficiency and renewable energy company that has provided program design and management services to energy efficiency program sponsors and energy professionals in the United States since 1984. CSG was bought by CLEAResult in July 2015.

== History ==
In response to the 1970s oil crisis in the United States, social entrepreneurs founded Conservation Services Group. The company opened its doors in Boston, Massachusetts, and now operates nationwide with nearly 800 staff and 23 offices. In 2011, the Worcester Business Journal listed CSG in first place on its list of top-growth nonprofits. For utility company and energy efficiency service provider sponsors, CSG has piloted and implemented some programs guided by the EPA. For example, in 1995, the company received a $500,000 grant to introduce the ENERGY STAR Homes program in New England. In 2001, the company began to implement an EPA-guided pilot program in New York. The program was evaluated later by Nexant and has been used as a model to inform other groups in the industry. In 2001, Steve Thomas, the host of the TV show This Old House, promoted the programs CSG delivered on behalf of its clients. One of these programs brought the "house-as-a-system" approach to New York. In 2006, CSG helped to build the first LEED-certified home in the United States. In 2008, working with several partners, CSG piloted a program in Oregon to develop an energy performance and greenhouse gas emissions scoring system for homes. In 2010 and 2011, CSG partnered with Chelsea Collaborative and other community and energy organizations in a foundation-funded effort to bring weatherization to underserved communities in Boston. CSG has become active in green jobs workforce development.

== Advocacy ==
By contributing to a report, Power to Spare: A Plan for Increasing New England's Competitiveness through Energy Efficiency (published in 1987), CSG proposed that energy efficiency could help reduce demand for electric power in Massachusetts while the economy was growing. The report was produced by New England Energy Policy Council with CSG’s Steve Cowell participating and with the support of Conservation Law Foundation, MASSPIRG, Massachusetts Audubon Society, and many other organizations. CSG also advocates for energy efficiency-related legislation such as the Regional Greenhouse Gas Initiative.

== Renewable energy ==
Renewable energy has been an ongoing interest of CSG’s. Although the company’s efforts to design and install large-scale solar power plants were discontinued around 2007, in 1998 CSG operated Sun Power Electric, which built the nation's first solar power plant. Sun Power Electric was active in various states including New York and Rhode Island. CSG also partnered with the Center for Ecological Technology (now known as the Center for EcoTechnology) to offer a renewable energy product called GreenerWatts New England.

== Climate offsets ==
In 2004, CSG developed ClimateSAVE, originally a Green-e certified Renewable Energy Certificate (REC) product based on wind and solar power which later became a carbon offset product. Although the product has been withdrawn from the market, it is still available to CSG employees. The company has been carbon-neutral since 2006 and earned a Climate Leadership Award for Goal Achievement from the U.S. EPA.
