= Black River Tribune =

- Type: Weekly newspaper
- Founder(s): William Hunter and Leigh Tofferi
- Founded: 1976
- Ceased publication: 2009
- Language: English
- City: Windsor, Vermont
- OCLC number: 16952540

The Black River Tribune was a weekly newspaper founded in 1976 and covered the areas of Springfield, Ludlow, Cavendish, Plymouth, Andover, and Mount Holly, Vermont. The paper stopped publishing in 2009.

== History ==
The Black River Tribune was co-founded and first edited by William Hunter and Leigh Tofferi. Hunter was a student at Yale who was also serving his second term in the Vermont Legislature. Hunter learned that year that he received a Rhodes Scholarship.

Future Governor of Connecticut Ned Lamont, a friend of Hunter's, became editor of the paper in 1977, soon after the paper began and ran the paper when Hunter left on his Rhodes Scholarship. Lamont was grandson of Thomas W. Lamont, who was the partner of financier J.P. Morgan. Lamont later ran for governor of Connecticut in 2010. The early-days Black River Tribune staff included a number of budding journalists such as Jane Mayer, Alex Beam, and Nelson Graves.

Hunter and Tofferi put the paper up for sale in 1981 so that Hunter could attend Harvard Law School and Tofferi could focus on being a Vermont legislator.

Hunter, serving in the Vermont Legislature in 1986 helped pen a libel law that would allow someone sued for libel to recoup legal expenses if the suit is deemed as frivolous. The goal, Hunter noted, was to reduce the number of harmful libel suits aimed at small local newspapers.

Will Hunter was later embroiled in several legal and criminal cases.

John Royston Coleman ran the paper for a decade. During that time, he officiated some of the first gay marriages in the country.

== Notable coverage ==
Early in the paper's history, it received national attention for its reporting on a resident in nearby Cavendish, Vermont, Alexander Solzhenitsyn.
