= Hartford FoxForce =

Professional co-ed tennis team

- Sport: Team tennis
- Founded: 1999
- League: World TeamTennis
- Team history: Hartford FoxForce; 2000–2006
- Based in: Hartford, Connecticut
- Stadium: State Arsenal and Armory 3,000; Blue Fox Run 2,500
- Owner: Lisa Wilson-Foley

The Hartford FoxForce were a professional co-ed tennis team in Connecticut that competed in the World TeamTennis (WTT).

== History ==
In 1999, owner Lisa Wilson-Foley and her husband franchised the World TeamTennis team Hartford FoxForce in Hartford, Connecticut. FoxForce's first drafted player was Monica Seles. In 2001 the team fielded brothers Murphy Jensen and Luke Jensen. Over the years the team fielded other well known players such as Bethanie Mattek-Sands, Boris Becker, and James Blake. The team played first at Hartford's 3,000 seat State Arsenal and Armory and later at a 2,500 seat outdoor stadium Wilson-Foley had built at her Blue Fox Run golf course in Avon, Connecticut. The Foley's shut the team down in 2007 due to a lack of corporate sponsorships.

== Record ==
=== Season standings ===
Year	Pos	Pld	W	L	Ref.
2000	3rd Eastern Conference	14	7	7	
2001	4th Eastern Conference	14	6	8	
2002	4th Eastern Conference	14	6	8	
2003	2nd Eastern Conference	14	8	6	
2004	1st Eastern Conference	14	9	5	
2005	3rd Eastern Conference	14	7	7	
2006	4th Eastern Conference	14	6	8	

== 2005 season ==
Date	Opponent	Home/Away	Location	Participants
July 5, 2005	Delaware Smash	Away		Shaughnessy
July 6, 2005	New York Sportimes	Away		Hingis
July 9, 2005	New York Buzz	Home		Shaughnessy
July 10, 2005	Springfield Lasers	Home		Shaughnessy
July 11, 2005	Delaware Smash	Away		
July 13, 2005	Sacramento Capitals	Home		Kournikova
July 14, 2005	New York Sportimes	Away		Becker/McEnroe
July 15, 2005	Houston Wranglers	Home		Becker
July 17, 2005	Sacramento Capitals	Away		Becker
July 18, 2005	Houston Wranglers	Away		Becker
July 20, 2005	Boston Lobsters	Home		Navratilova
July 21, 2005	Boston Lobsters	Away		Navratilova
July 23, 2005	Philadelphia Freedoms	Away		
July 24, 2005	Philadelphia Freedoms	Home		

== Coach history ==
- Paul Assaiante (2000-2002, 2004)
- Peter Bradshaw (2003)
- Donald Johnson (2006)

== Former players ==
- Cam Bhuta (2002)
- James Blake (2000, 2002-2003)
- Doug Bohaboy (2000)
- Goran Dragicevic (2006)
- Mardy Fish (2004)
- Geoff Grant (2002)
- Levar Harper-Griffith (2000)
- Liezel Huber (2000)
- Stephen Huss (2004)
- Luke Jensen (2001-2002)
- Murphy Jensen (2000-2002)
- Sonya Jeyaseelan (2001)
- Donald Johnson (2004-2005)
- Magdalena Maleeva (2001)
- Bethanie Mattek-Sands (2000)
- Lisa McShea (2004-2006)
- Martina Müller (2003)
- Rossana de los Ríos (2002)
- Mark Philippoussis (2005)
- Aleco Preovolos (2005)
- Monica Seles (2000-2001)
- Milagros Sequera (2003-2005)
- Meghann Shaughnessy (2002-2006)
- Bryanne Stewart (2002)
- Betty Ann Grubb Stuart (2002)
- Wesley Whitehouse (2004-2005)
