= State Arsenal and Armory =

- U.S. National Register of Historic Places
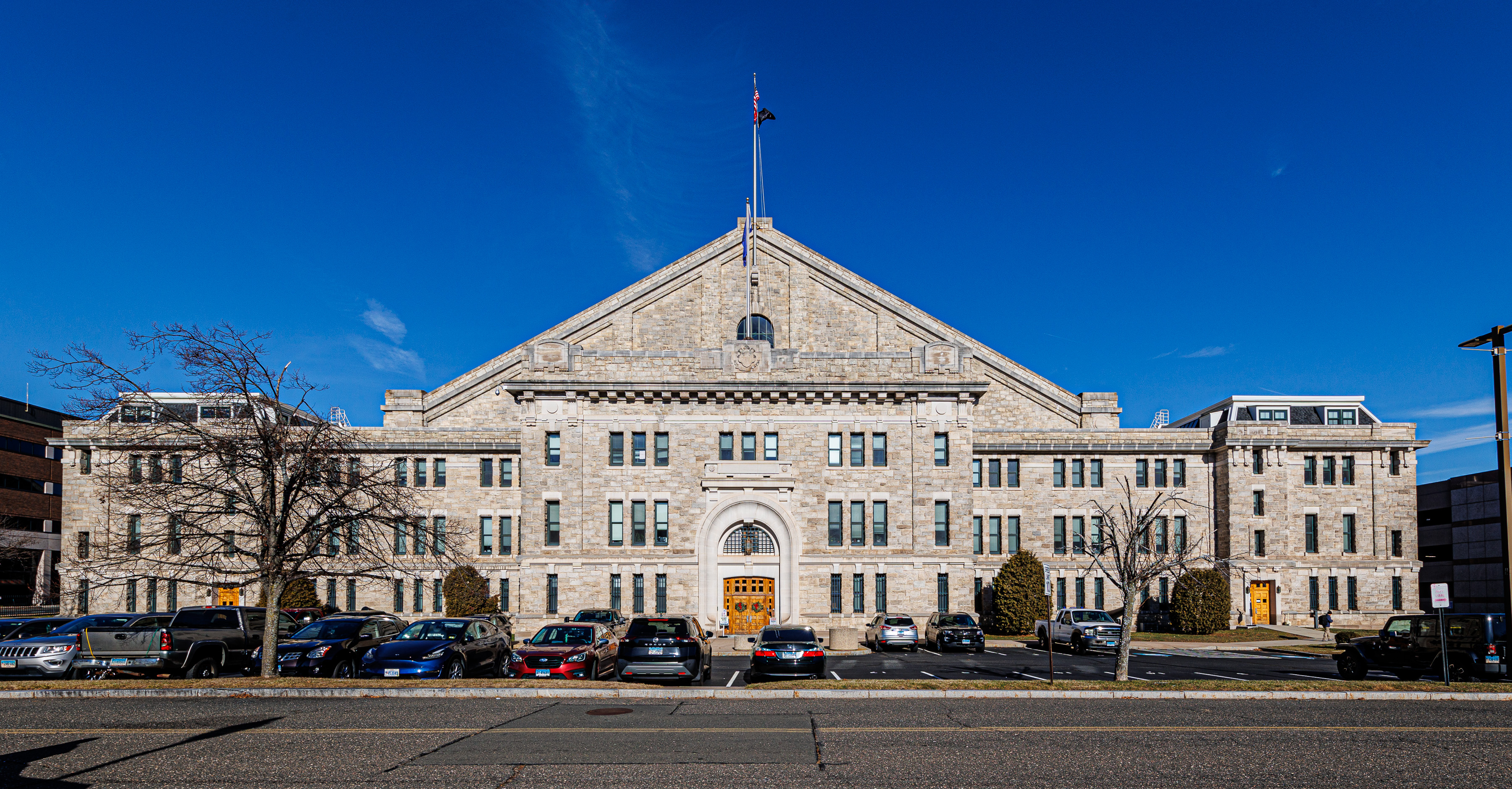

- Location within Connecticut Location within the United States
- Location: 360 Broad Street, Hartford, Connecticut
- Coordinates: 41°45′54″N 72°41′10″W
- Area: 3.5 acres (1.4 ha)
- Built: 1906
- Architect: Morris, B.W.; Payne, W.A., et al.
- Architectural style: Late 19th And 20th Century Revivals
- NRHP reference No.: 96000357
- Added to NRHP: April 4, 1996

The State Arsenal and Armory, formally the Governor William A. O'Neill State Armory and informally the Connecticut State Armory, is a historic military facility at 360 Broad Street in Hartford, Connecticut. Built in 1906, it is a distinctive example of Classical Revival architecture, built using then-innovative construction techniques involving concrete and cast stone. It was listed on the National Register of Historic Places in 1996. It serves as the headquarters of the Connecticut State Militia.

== Description and history ==
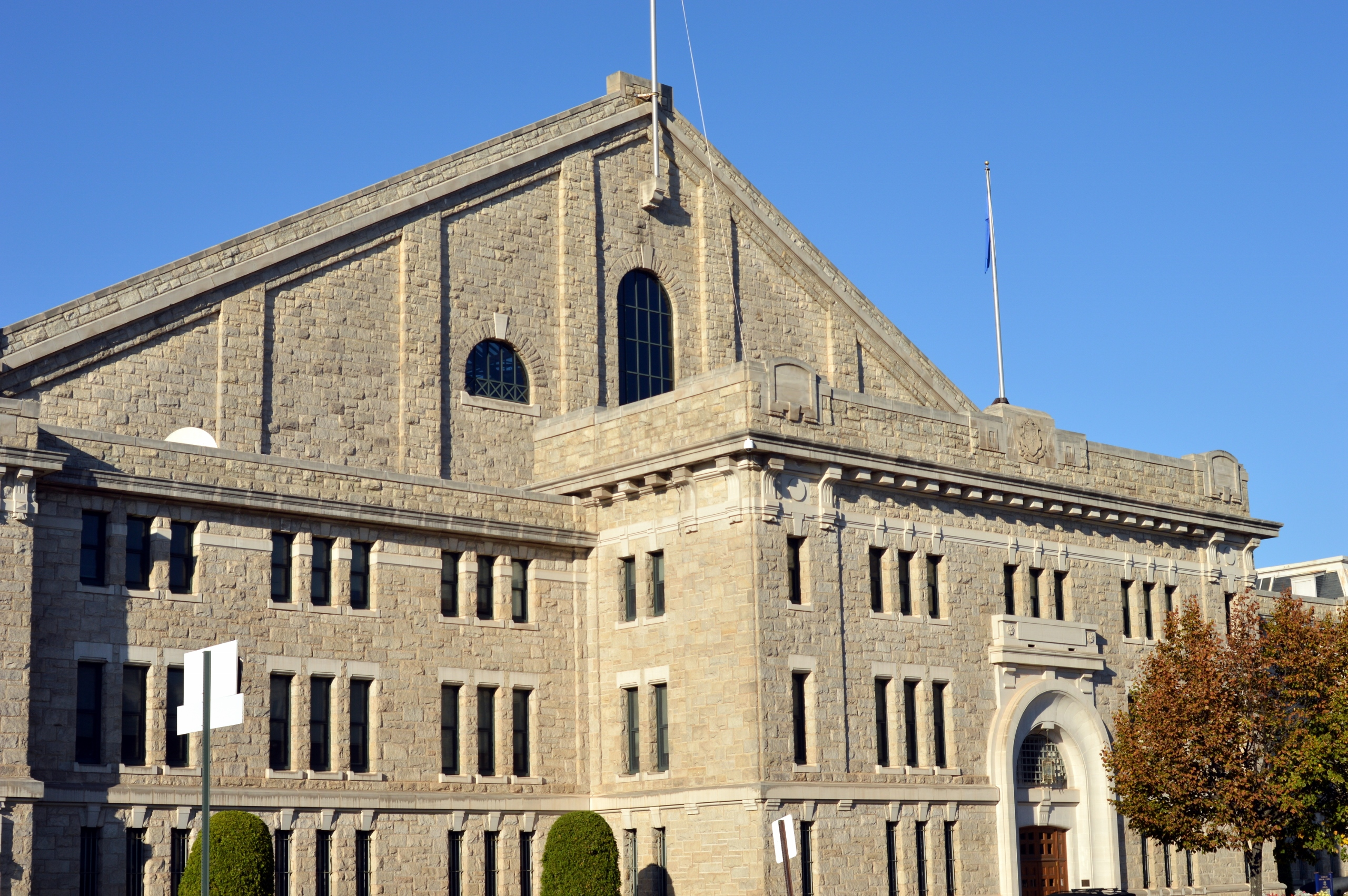
Detail

The Connecticut State Arsenal and Armory is a large building located on the west side of the state capitol complex west of downtown Hartford. It is located just south of Interstate 84 and west of the Legislative Office Building, on the east side of Broad Street. The building functionally has two sections: a three-story "head house", in which offices and other facilities are located, and a large drill hall with a gabled roof. It is built mainly out of rough-cut granite blocks in an eclectic Classical Revival styling. Windows are generally narrow, and set in separate openings grouped up to three in a row. Limestone stringcourses top the first and third floors on the headhouse, where pilasters articulate the corners. The main entrance is set in the center of a broad projecting section of the headhouse, in a round-arch opening. The interior of the drill hall is 1.14 acres (0.46 ha) in size, with a ramp from Broad Street providing ready access for the movement of heavy equipment. Its roof is constructed out of prefabricated concrete panels supported by steel trusses. The basement level houses weapons storage areas and formerly housed a firing range.

The state began considering construction of a major new armory facility in the early 20th century. After a drawn-out decision-making and land acquisition process, the present building was dedicated in 1909. Its design was by Benjamin Wistar Morris III, who had worked as draftsman at Carrere & Hastings before opening his own office in New York City in 1900. At the time of this building's development, John M. Carrere was a consultant to the city, and recommended its placement in the legislative area as part of a City Beautiful design plan. The building's trim was originally cast cement, with the molds and forming taking place on site. This trim was replaced with limestone during a major rehabilitation in the 1990s.

== Sports ==
The State Arsenal and Armory has been used as the home venue for the Connecticut Pride basketball team and the Hartford FoxForce tennis team.

== See also ==
- National Register of Historic Places listings in Hartford, Connecticut
