= Family Institute of Connecticut =

U.S. non-profit advocacy organization

- Formation: 1989; 36 years ago
- Type: Nonprofit
- Headquarters: Hartford, Connecticut
- Executive Director: Peter Wolfgang
- Director of Operations: Lawrence Taffner
- Director of Communications: Christina Bennett
- Website: ctfamily.org

The Family Institute of Connecticut is an interdenominational, conservative 501(c)(3) non-profit advocacy organization founded in 1989. Its stated goal is to encourage and strengthen the family as the foundation of society and to promote Judeo-Christian ethical and moral values in the culture and government of Connecticut.

It has been a vocal opponent of assisted suicide, abortion, and same-sex marriage in Connecticut. The organization is a Family Policy Council, meaning that it is the state affiliate of Focus on the Family.

== Organizational structure ==
The FIC comprises three organizations:

- The Family Institute of Connecticut focuses on marriage-strengthening projects, educational efforts, and research. It opposes abortion, assisted suicide, and same-sex marriage, promotes alternatives to public schools, and has programs to strengthen marriages for opposite-sex couples.
- FIC Action is a 501(c)(4) social welfare organization founded in 2004. It conducts political lobbying at the state level to oppose assisted suicide and previously lobbied against same-sex marriage.
- The Family Institute of Connecticut Action Committee is a registered state of Connecticut political action committee. FIC Action Committee was created in 2004 to promote candidates for Connecticut state government who are sympathetic to the organization's agenda.

== Board of Directors ==
- Ken Von Kohorn, Chairman
- Richard Caporaso, Treasurer
- John Hummel
- Gary G. Jackson
- Dick Kazarian
- Ed Morgan

== Advisors ==
- Michael Jarjura, former mayor, Waterbury
- Win Smith, former state senator Milford
- Greg M. Hannan, attorney, Wallingford
- Rev. LeRoy Bailey, Jr., Senior Pastor, The First Cathedral, Bloomfield
- Rabbi Yehoshua S. Hecht, Beth Israel Synagogue, Norwalk
- Rev. Earl M. Inswiller, Jr., Living Waters Fellowship Church, Windsor Locks
