= Death of Sarah Grosvenor =

1742 death following a failed abortion

Sarah Grosvenor
- Born: c. 1723; Pomfret, Connecticut
- Died: September 14, 1742 (aged 19)

Sarah Grosvenor (c. 1723 – September 14, 1742) was the subject of a colonial court hearing after an unsuccessful abortion resulted in her death. After a seemingly successful surgical abortion performed by Dr. John Hallowell, Grosvenor became sick.

She died on September 14, 1742, in her hometown of Pomfret, Connecticut, after surgical complications. Grosvenor's case has been argued as one of the best-known surgical abortion cases in colonial America.

== Early life and romantic relationship ==
Sarah Grosvenor was the daughter of Mary and Leicester Grosvenor. Her family owned farmland, and her father held a high position within the local offices. Grosvenor developed a secret relationship at age 19 with 27-year-old Amasa Sessions. Both came from valued families within their village, indicating that had they married, their marriage would have been accepted by both families.

== Pregnancy and termination ==
Grosvenor became pregnant from sex with Amasa. After coercion, she eventually began "taking the trade", an abortifacient, in an attempt to abort the fetus. Although abortions were not common in colonial America, abortifacients, the herbal remedies and different combinations or “recipes” intended to induce abortion, were widely used and considered an acceptable method of ending early pregnancy. Only when quickening occurred did it become unacceptable for a mother to abort the fetus, as this was when both the court and the church identified a fetus as a living individual. Sarah Grosvenor was initially extremely against taking the abortifacient. Her friend Abigail Nightingale's testimony portrayed this when she recalled Grosvenor begging Amasa not to force her to add sin to sin. She ultimately took the abortifacient, but it did not succeed. Amasa enlisted Dr. John Hallowell to perform the procedure as Sarah Grosvenor was beginning to show, and Dr. Hallowell assumed that she would not miscarry. Two days later, Grosvenor had a miscarriage. Ten days after the operation, she became sick and died, most likely from infection due to the use of dirty tools in an unsanitary environment.

== Court hearing ==
Three years after Grosvenor's death, her case was taken to court. Historians believe the incident came to the attention of the court after years of gossip and rumors. Sarah's sister Zerviah and Sarah's friend Abigail Nightingale testified in court, recounting what Grosvenor had confessed to both of them separately from her death bed. The court identified her physician, John Hallowell, and her lover, Amasa Sessions, as responsible for her murder. The court charged the individuals for both putting Sarah into bad health and the attempted abortion, as it was done in an attempt to conceal her pregnancy. The court hearing ended in Amasa's innocence and the conviction of Hallowell with a misdemeanor. The court case did not acknowledge Grosvenor's abortion as murder of the fetus, even though Zerviah had testified that Grosvenor had felt the child move from within her. It has been understood by historians that Amasa was deemed innocent as he had lost his lover and had not performed the operation that resulted in her death.

== See also ==
- Abortion in the United States
- Abortifacient

== Sources ==
- "The New England Historical and Genealogical Register." Google Books. New England Historic Genealogical Society, n.d. Web. a.d. 13 Sept. 2016.
- Smith, Merril D. Women's Roles in Eighteenth-Century America. Santa Barbara, CA: Greenwood, 2010. Print. a.d. 13 Sept. 2016
- Dayton, Cornelia Hughes. "Taking the Trade: Abortion and Gender Relations in Eighteenth-Century New England Village." The William and Mary Quarterly 48.1 (1991): 19-49. Web. a.d. 13 Sept. 2016
- Breslaw, Elaine G. "Giving Birth." Lotions, Potions, Pills, and Magic: Health Care in Early America. NYU, 2012. 113-34. Web. a.d. 13 Sept. 2016
- Cheu, Maggie. "Now and Then: How Coverture Ideology Informs the Rhetoric of Abortion." Texas Journal of Women and the Law 22.1 (2012): 113-30. ProQuest. Web. a.d. 13 Sept. 2016
- Doan, Alesha E. Opposition & Intimidation: The Abortion Wars & Strategies of Political Harassment. N.p.: U of Michigan, 2007. Print. a.d. 13 Sept. 2016
