= Connecticut Pride =

American professional basketball team

- Conference: American
- Leagues: CBA (1993–2001); IBL (2001)
- Founded: 1993
- Folded: 2001
- History: Hartford Hellcats (1993–2000) Connecticut Pride (2000–2001)
- Arena: State Arsenal and Armory; Hartford Civic Center; University of Hartford Sports Center; New Haven Coliseum
- Team colors: tan, purple, teal
- Ownership: Brian Foley
- Championships: 1 1999
- Conference titles: 2 1999, 2001

The Connecticut Pride (from 1993 to 1994 the Hartford Hellcats) were an American professional basketball team based in Hartford, Connecticut, that was a member of the Continental Basketball Association (CBA). They played in Hartford from 1993 to 2000, primarily at the Connecticut State Arsenal and Armory, and also at the Hartford Civic Center and the University of Hartford Sports Center. Its final season, from 2000 to 2001, was played at the New Haven Coliseum.

The team was previously known as the Albany Patroons, Capital Region Pontiacs, and Hartford Hellcats. With the collapse of the CBA during the 2000/01 season, the team joined the International Basketball League.

== Year-by-year ==
Year	League	GP	W	L	Pct.	QW	Reg. season	Playoffs
Hartford Hellcats
1993/94	CBA	56	18	38	.321	100.0	3rd, American Eastern	Did not qualify
Connecticut Pride
1994/95	CBA	34	11	23	.324		4th, American Eastern	N/A
1995/96	CBA						3rd, American Eastern	Did not qualify
1996/97	CBA						5th, American	Did not qualify
1997/98	CBA						3rd, American	Semifinals
1998/99	CBA						1st, American	Champions
1999/00	CBA						2nd, American	1st Round
2000/01	CBA						1st, American	No playoff
2000/01	IBL						David Young named team MVP	Did not qualify

== All-time roster ==
- Danya Abrams
- Cedric Ball
- Darrell Barley
- Derrick Battie
- Alex Blackwell
- Bernard Blunt
- Walter Bond
- Ira Bowman
- Derrick Brown
- Troy Brown
- Rick Brunson
- Keith Bullock
- John Coker
- Ken Conley
- Modie Cox
- Dan Cross
- Corey Crowder
- Jevon Crudup
- Muntrelle Dobbins
- Mario Donaldson
- Mark Donnelly
- Spencer Dunkley
- Brian Edwards
- Jay Edwards
- Roney Eford
- Brian Fair
- Isaac Fontaine
- Reggie Freeman
- Michael Evans
- Tate George
- Greg Grant
- Adrian Griffin
- Jermaine Guice
- Chris Harris
- Otis Hill
- Lucious Jackson
- Randell Jackson
- Ponce James
- Chris Jent
- Kannard Johnson
- Lamont Jones
- Shelton Jones
- Jeff Kent
- John Kimbrell
- Kirk King
- Rusty LaRue
- Todd Lindeman
- James Martin
- Johnny McDowell
- BJ McKie
- Rick Mickens
- Harry Moore
- Ricky Moore
- Jeff Myers
- Julius Nwosu
- Kevin Ollie
- Damian Owens
- Mike Pegues
- Jamie Peterson
- Jerry Reynolds
- Rumeal Robinson
- Tick Rogers
- Shawnelle Scott
- Tom Sheehey
- Willie Simms
- Carl Simpson
- Charles Smith
- Troy Smith
- Jarod Stevenson
- Justus Thigpen
- Charles Thomas
- Logan Vander Velden
- Antonio Watson
- Ennis Whatley
- Chuckie White
- Aaron Williams
- Brent Williams
- Theron Wilson
- A. J. Wynder
- Arthur. S Glover

== See also ==
- Hartford FoxForce
