= List of 1999–2000 NBA season transactions =

This is a list of all transactions occurring in the 1999–2000 NBA season.

== Retirement ==
Date	Name	Team(s) played (years)	Age	Notes	Ref.
October 12	Kevin Johnson	Cleveland Cavaliers (1987–1988); Phoenix Suns (1988–1998, 2000)	33	Came out of retirement later on in the season.	
April 20	Charles Barkley	Philadelphia 76ers (1984–1992); Phoenix Suns (1992–1996); Houston Rockets (1996–2000)	37		
May 16	Jeff Hornacek	Phoenix Suns (1986–1992); Philadelphia 76ers (1992–1994); Utah Jazz (1994–2000)	37		

== Head coaches ==
- 1999-2000 NBA season

== Trades ==
June
June 29	To Golden State Warriors: Mookie Blaylock; 1999 1st round pick (Jeff Foster)	To Atlanta Hawks: Bimbo Coles; Duane Ferrell; 1999 1st round pick (Jason Terry)
June 30	To Seattle SuperSonics: Horace Grant; 2000 2nd round pick (Olumide Oyedeji); 2001 2nd round pick (Bobby Simmons)	To Orlando Magic: Dale Ellis; Don MacLean; Billy Owens; Draft rights to Corey Maggette
June 30	To Philadelphia 76ers: Draft rights to Jumaine Jones	To Atlanta Hawks: 2000 1st round pick (Quentin Richardson)
June 30	To Golden State Warriors: Draft rights to Vonteego Cummings; 2001 1st round pick (Troy Murphy)	To Indiana Pacers: Draft rights to Jeff Foster
June 30	To Orlando Magic: Draft rights to Louis Bullock	To Minnesota Timberwolves: Cash considerations
June 30	To San Antonio Spurs: Draft rights to Gordan Giriček; 2000 2nd round pick (Chris Carrawell)	To Dallas Mavericks: Draft rights to Leon Smith
June 30	To Portland Trail Blazers: Draft rights to Roberto Bergersen	To Atlanta Hawks: Cash considerations
August
August 1	To Indiana Pacers: Draft rights to Jonathan Bender	To Toronto Raptors: Antonio Davis
August 2	To Atlanta Hawks: Jim Jackson; Isaiah Rider	To Portland Trail Blazers: Ed Gray; Steve Smith
August 3	To Sacramento Kings: Nick Anderson	To Orlando Magic: Tariq Abdul-Wahad; 2003 1st round pick (Kendrick Perkins was later selected)
August 3	To Boston Celtics: Danny Fortson; Eric Washington; Eric Williams; 2001 1st round pick (Kedrick Brown was later selected)	To Denver Nuggets: Popeye Jones; Ron Mercer; Dwayne Schintzius
August 4	To Cleveland Cavaliers: Lamond Murray	To Los Angeles Clippers: Derek Anderson; Johnny Newman
August 5	To Phoenix Suns: Penny Hardaway	To Orlando Magic: Pat Garrity; Danny Manning; 2001 1st round pick (Jason Collins was later selected); 2002 1st round pick (Amar'e Stoudemire was later selected)
August 8	To Atlanta Hawks: Lorenzen Wright	To Los Angeles Clippers: 2000 1st round pick (Quentin Richardson was later selected); 2002 1st round pick (Chris Wilcox was later selected)
August 11	To Washington Wizards: Isaac Austin	To Orlando Magic: Terry Davis; Tim Legler; Jeff McInnis; Ben Wallace
August 12	To Chicago Bulls: James Cotton; Hersey Hawkins	To Seattle SuperSonics: Brent Barry
August 13	To Philadelphia 76ers: Billy Owens	To Orlando Magic: Harvey Grant; Anthony Parker
August 19	To Milwaukee Bucks: Dale Ellis; Danny Manning	To Orlando Magic: Chris Gatling; Armen Gilliam
August 27	Three-team trade	
August 27	To Houston Rockets: Don MacLean (from Orlando); 2001 1st round pick (Jason Collins was later selected) (from Orlando); Steve Francis (from Vancouver); Tony Massenburg (from Vancouver)	To Vancouver Grizzlies: Antoine Carr (from Houston); Michael Dickerson (from Houston); Othella Harrington (from Houston); Brent Price (from Houston); 2003 1st round pick (Marcus Banks was later selected) (from Houston); 2002 2nd round pick (Matt Barnes was later selected) (from Orlando)
August 27	To Orlando Magic: Lee Mayberry (from Vancouver); Makhtar N'Diaye (from Vancouver); Rodrick Rhodes (from Vancouver); Michael Smith (from Vancouver)	
September
September 1	To Dallas Mavericks: Sean Rooks; 2000 2nd round pick (Pete Mickeal was later selected)	To Los Angeles Lakers: A.C. Green
September 22	To Orlando Magic: 2001 2nd round pick (Omar Cook was later selected)	To Washington Wizards: Laron Profit
September 23	To New Jersey Nets: Eric Murdock	To Los Angeles Clippers: Johnny Newman
September 29	To Dallas Mavericks: Chris Anstey	To Chicago Bulls: 2000 2nd round pick (Dan Langhi was later selected)
October
October 2	To Houston Rockets: Stacey Augmon; Kelvin Cato; Ed Gray; Carlos Rogers; Brian Shaw; Walt Williams	To Portland Trail Blazers: Scottie Pippen
January
January 18	To Charlotte Hornets: Dale Ellis	To Milwaukee Bucks: 2000 2nd round pick (Jason Hart was later selected); 2002 2nd round pick (Chris Owens was later selected)
February
February 1	To Denver Nuggets: Tariq Abdul-Wahad; Chris Gatling; Future 1st round pick (Omar Cook)	To Orlando Magic: Chauncey Billups; Ron Mercer; Johnny Taylor
February 16	Three-team trade	
February 16	To Chicago Bulls: John Starks (from Golden State); 2000 1st round pick (Chris Mihm was later selected) (from Golden State); Bruce Bowen (from Philadelphia)	To Philadelphia 76ers: Toni Kukoč (from Chicago)
February 16	To Golden State Warriors: Larry Hughes (from Philadelphia); Billy Owens (from Philadelphia)	
February 24	To Atlanta Hawks: 2004 2nd round pick (Viktor Sanikidze was later selected)	To Orlando Magic: Anthony Johnson

== Released ==
Player	Date waived	Former team
Trevor Winter	May 4	Minnesota Timberwolves
Alvin Sims	May 4	Miami Heat
Marlon Garnett	May 4	Boston Celtics
Dominique Wilkins	June 14	Orlando Magic
Gerald Wilkins	June 25	Orlando Magic
Terry Porter	July 1	Miami Heat
Dennis Scott	July 1	Minnesota Timberwolves
Reggie Jordan	July 1	Minnesota Timberwolves
Bill Curley	July 1	Minnesota Timberwolves
Micheal Williams	August 1	Toronto Raptors
Gerard King	August 1	San Antonio Spurs
Oliver Miller	August 1	Sacramento Kings
Michael Hawkins	August 1	Sacramento Kings
Olden Polynice	August 2	Miami Heat
John Crotty	August 2	Seattle SuperSonics
Drew Barry	August 2	Seattle SuperSonics
Rony Seikaly	August 3	New Jersey Nets
Vernon Maxwell	August 3	Sacramento Kings
Charles Jones	August 4	Chicago Bulls
Carl Herrera	August 6	Denver Nuggets
Loren Meyer	August 6	Denver Nuggets
Kelly McCarty	August 6	Denver Nuggets
Casey Shaw	August 9	Philadelphia 76ers
Stojko Vranković	August 10	Los Angeles Clippers
Mark Davis	August 15	Miami Heat
Duane Ferrell	August 16	Atlanta Hawks
Tyrone Corbin	August 16	Atlanta Hawks
Negele Knight	August 31	Toronto Raptors
Pooh Richardson	September 9	Los Angeles Clippers
Ron Harper	September 16	Chicago Bulls
Jeff McInnis	September 16	Orlando Magic
Keith Booth	September 22	Chicago Bulls
Michael Smith	September 29	Orlando Magic
Rodrick Rhodes	October 4	Orlando Magic
Stacey Augmon	October 12	Houston Rockets
Tony Smith	October 14	Cleveland Cavaliers
Zendon Hamilton	October 15	Dallas Mavericks
Ben Davis	October 15	Dallas Mavericks
Maceo Baston	October 20	Chicago Bulls
Michael Hawkins	October 25	Detroit Pistons
Shawnelle Scott	October 26	Denver Nuggets
Torraye Braggs	October 27	Utah Jazz
Ira Newble	October 27	San Antonio Spurs
Cory Carr	October 27	Chicago Bulls
Stephen Jackson	October 28	Vancouver Grizzlies
Benoit Benjamin	October 28	Los Angeles Lakers
Randell Jackson	October 28	Washington Wizards
Doug Overton	October 28	Philadelphia 76ers
Earl Boykins	October 28	Cleveland Cavaliers
Jamel Thomas	October 28	Cleveland Cavaliers
Terry Davis	October 29	Orlando Magic
Art Long	October 29	Sacramento Kings
Kevin Ollie	October 29	Dallas Mavericks
Mark Pope	October 30	Indiana Pacers
Mitchell Butler	October 30	Indiana Pacers
Keith Askins	November 1	Miami Heat
Rusty LaRue	November 1	Chicago Bulls
Bill Curley	November 1	Golden State Warriors
Mark Davis	November 1	Golden State Warriors
Matt Maloney	November 1	Houston Rockets
Don MacLean	November 1	Houston Rockets
Jason Miskiri	November 8	Charlotte Hornets
Wayne Turner	November 8	Boston Celtics
Rodrick Rhodes	November 11	Philadelphia 76ers
Sam Jacobson	November 12	Los Angeles Lakers
Marcus Brown	November 13	Detroit Pistons
Armen Gilliam	November 15	Orlando Magic
Benoit Benjamin	November 18	Cleveland Cavaliers
Derek Hood	November 23	Charlotte Hornets
Stanley Roberts	November 24	Philadelphia 76ers
Joe Stephens	November 30	Vancouver Grizzlies
Damon Jones	November 30	Golden State Warriors
Marty Conlon	December 13	Boston Celtics
Chris Carr	December 16	Golden State Warriors
Randell Jackson	December 20	Dallas Mavericks
Earl Boykins	December 20	Orlando Magic
Lari Ketner	December 20	Chicago Bulls
Gerald Brown	December 21	Phoenix Suns
Jamel Thomas	December 23	Boston Celtics
Rusty LaRue	December 29	Chicago Bulls
DeMarco Johnson	December 29	New York Knicks
Tim Legler	December 29	Golden State Warriors
Kornel David	January 3	Chicago Bulls
Jamel Thomas	January 3	Golden State Warriors
Dedric Willoughby	January 4	Chicago Bulls
Khalid Reeves	January 4	Chicago Bulls
A.J. Bramlett	January 5	Cleveland Cavaliers
Mark Hendrickson	January 5	Cleveland Cavaliers
Rick Hughes	January 5	Dallas Mavericks
Damon Jones	January 5	Dallas Mavericks
Drew Barry	January 5	Golden State Warriors
Devin Gray	January 5	Houston Rockets
Marty Conlon	January 5	Los Angeles Clippers
Ben Davis	January 5	Phoenix Suns
Pete Chilcutt	January 7	Utah Jazz
Ben Davis	January 11	Phoenix Suns
Thomas Hamilton	January 13	Houston Rockets
Kiwane Garris	January 16	Orlando Magic
Jamel Thomas	January 18	Golden State Warriors
Chucky Brown	February 4	San Antonio Spurs
Haywoode Workman	February 7	Milwaukee Bucks
Mirsad Türkcan	February 9	New York Knicks
Michael Cage	February 14	New Jersey Nets
Bruce Bowen	February 18	Chicago Bulls
Rex Walters	February 23	Miami Heat
Reggie Jordan	March 3	Washington Wizards
Dennis Rodman	March 8	Dallas Mavericks
Donny Marshall	March 12	Cleveland Cavaliers
Sam Mack	March 20	Golden State Warriors
Isaiah Rider	March 20	Atlanta Hawks
Mark West	March 25	Phoenix Suns
Troy Hudson	March 27	Los Angeles Clippers

== Signings ==
Player	Date signed	New team	Former team
Toby Bailey	July 30	Phoenix Suns	
Adrian Griffin	August 8	Boston Celtics	Miami Heat (USBL)
George Lynch	August 8	Miami Heat	
Karl Malone	August 8	Utah Jazz	
Oliver Miller	August 8	Seattle SuperSonics	Sacramento Kings
Scot Pollard	August 8	Sacramento Kings	
Clifford Robinson	August 8	Miami Heat	
Eric Snow	August 8	Philadelphia 76ers	
Jud Buechler	August 2	Detroit Pistons	
Michael Curry	August 2	Detroit Pistons	Milwaukee Bucks
Jelani McCoy	August 2	Seattle SuperSonics	
Jermaine O'Neal	August 2	Portland Trail Blazers	
Detlef Schrempf	August 2	Portland Trail Blazers	Seattle SuperSonics
Jon Barry	August 3	Sacramento Kings	
Greg Buckner	August 3	Dallas Mavericks	Grand Rapids Hoops (CBA)
Jamie Feick	August 3	New Jersey Nets	
Harold Jamison	August 3	Miami Heat	Clemson Tigers
Bo Outlaw	August 3	Orlando Magic	
Rodney Rogers	August 3	Phoenix Suns	Los Angeles Clippers
Wayne Turner	August 3	Boston Celtics	Kentucky Wildcats
Calbert Cheaney	August 4	Boston Celtics	Washington Wizards
Dell Curry	August 4	Toronto Raptors	Milwaukee Bucks
Lawrence Funderburke	August 4	Sacramento Kings	
Gary Grant	August 4	Portland Trail Blazers	
Darrick Martin	August 4	Sacramento Kings	Los Angeles Clippers
Amal McCaskill	August 4	Miami Heat	Panionios (Greece)
George McCloud	August 4	Denver Nuggets	Tampa Bay Windjammers (USBL)
Terry Porter	August 4	San Antonio Spurs	Miami Heat
Otis Thorpe	August 4	Miami Heat	Washington Wizards
Nick Van Exel	August 4	Denver Nuggets	
Penny Hardaway	August 5	Phoenix Suns (sign-and-trade)	Orlando Magic
Mark Davis	August 5	Boston Celtics	
Rick Fox	August 5	Los Angeles Lakers	
Jaren Jackson	August 5	San Antonio Spurs	
Anthony Carter	August 6	Miami Heat	Yakima SunKings (CBA)
Vernon Maxwell	August 6	Seattle SuperSonics	Sacramento Kings
John Wallace	August 6	New York Knicks	Toronto Raptors
Haywoode Workman	August 9	Milwaukee Bucks	
Corey Brewer	August 10	Miami Heat	Grand Rapids Hoops (CBA)
Tyrone Nesby RFA	August 10	Los Angeles Clippers (matched offer sheet from San Antonio)	
Ruben Patterson	August 10	Seattle SuperSonics	Los Angeles Lakers
Eric Piatkowski	August 10	Los Angeles Clippers	
David Wingate	August 10	New York Knicks	
Jeff McInnis	August 11	Orlando Magic (sign-and-trade)	Washington Wizards
Eddie Robinson	August 11	Charlotte Hornets	Central Oklahoma
Mark Bryant	August 12	Cleveland Cavaliers	Chicago Bulls
Scott Burrell	August 12	New Jersey Nets	
Gheorghe Mureșan	August 12	New Jersey Nets	
Michael Stewart	August 12	Toronto Raptors	
Shammond Williams	August 12	Seattle SuperSonics	Ülkerspor (Turkey)
Harvey Grant	August 13	Orlando Magic (sign-and-trade)	Philadelphia 76ers
Tony Delk	August 16	Sacramento Kings	Golden State Warriors
Derek Fisher	August 16	Los Angeles Lakers	
Greg Foster	August 16	Seattle SuperSonics	Utah Jazz
Randy Livingston	August 16	Phoenix Suns	
Dan Majerle	August 16	Miami Heat	
Joe Smith	August 16	Minnesota Timberwolves	
Tom Hammonds	August 17	Minnesota Timberwolves	
Aaron Williams	August 17	Washington Wizards	Seattle SuperSonics
Vin Baker	August 18	Seattle SuperSonics	
Todd Fuller	August 18	Charlotte Hornets	Utah Jazz
Jonathan Kerner	August 19	Washington Wizards	Orlando Magic
Jason Lawson	August 19	Washington Wizards	Atlanta Hawks
J. R. Reid	August 19	Milwaukee Bucks	Los Angeles Lakers
Fred Vinson	August 19	Seattle SuperSonics	New Jersey ShoreCats (USBL)
Emanual Davis	August 20	Seattle SuperSonics	Panionios (Greece)
Terrell Brandon	August 24	Minnesota Timberwolves	Milwaukee Bucks
Cory Carr	August 24	Chicago Bulls	
Chris Crawford	August 24	Atlanta Hawks	
Erick Dampier	August 24	Golden State Warriors	
Cedric Henderson	August 24	Cleveland Cavaliers	
Mitch Richmond	August 24	Washington Wizards	
Andrae Patterson	August 26	Minnesota Timberwolves	
Will Perdue	August 26	Chicago Bulls	San Antonio Spurs
Samaki Walker	August 26	San Antonio Spurs	Dallas Mavericks
B. J. Armstrong	August 27	Chicago Bulls	Orlando Magic
Cedric Ceballos	August 27	Dallas Mavericks	
Olden Polynice	August 27	Utah Jazz	Seattle SuperSonics
Dennis Scott	August 27	Vancouver Grizzlies	Minnesota Timberwolves
Gary Trent	August 27	Dallas Mavericks	
Felton Spencer	August 31	San Antonio Spurs	Golden State Warriors
A.C. Green	September 1	Los Angeles Lakers (sign-and-trade)	Dallas Mavericks
Shawnelle Scott	September 1	Denver Nuggets	Titanes de Morovis (Puerto Rico)
Terry Cummings	September 2	Golden State Warriors	New York Knicks
Charles Oakley	September 2	Toronto Raptors	
Shannon Smith	September 2	Indiana Pacers	unknown
Malik Rose	September 3	San Antonio Spurs	
Bill Wennington	September 7	Sacramento Kings	Chicago Bulls
Randell Jackson	September 8	Washington Wizards	
Andy Panko	September 8	Los Angeles Lakers	Lebanon Valley
Corie Blount	September 9	Phoenix Suns	Cleveland Cavaliers
Ryan Stack	September 10	Cleveland Cavaliers	
Rex Walters	September 12	Miami Heat	
Raja Bell	September 13	Atlanta Hawks	FIU Golden Panthers
DeMarco Johnson	September 13	New York Knicks	Sony Milano (Italy)
Brett Robisch	September 13	Chicago Bulls	San Antonio Spurs
Grant Long	September 14	Vancouver Grizzlies	Atlanta Hawks
Rafer Alston	September 15	Milwaukee Bucks	Idaho Stampede (CBA)
Bruce Bowen	September 15	Philadelphia 76ers	Boston Celtics
Lazaro Borell	September 16	Seattle SuperSonics	Lobos de Villa Clara (Cuba)
Ryan Bowen	September 16	Denver Nuggets	Oyak Renault (Turkey)
Fred Hoiberg	September 16	Chicago Bulls	Indiana Pacers
Ira Newble	September 16	San Antonio Spurs	Idaho Stampede (CBA)
Dickey Simpkins	September 16	Chicago Bulls	
Monty Williams	September 17	Orlando Magic	Denver Nuggets
Terry Mills	September 19	Detroit Pistons	Miami Heat
John Amaechi	September 20	Orlando Magic	CSP Limoges (France)
Chucky Atkins	September 20	Orlando Magic	Cibona Zagreb (Croatia)
Ira Bowman	September 20	Portland Trail Blazers	Connecticut Pride (CBA)
Michael Cage	September 20	New Jersey Nets	
Rick Brunson	September 21	New York Knicks	Connecticut Pride (CBA)
Jimmy Carruth	September 21	Portland Trail Blazers	unknown
Thomas Hamilton	September 21	Houston Rockets	Miami Heat
Muggsy Bogues	September 22	Toronto Raptors	Golden State Warriors
Darvin Ham	September 22	Milwaukee Bucks	CB Granada (Spain)
Art Long	September 22	Sacramento Kings	Idaho Stampede (CBA)
Jason Miskiri	September 22	Charlotte Hornets	George Mason Patriots
Pooh Richardson	September 22	Detroit Pistons	Los Angeles Clippers
Doug Overton	September 27	Philadelphia 76ers	New Jersey Nets
Milt Palacio	September 27	Vancouver Grizzlies	Colorado State Rams
Charles Shackleford	September 27	Milwaukee Bucks	Charlotte Hornets
James Collins	September 28	Washington Wizards	Quad City Thunder (CBA)
Derek Grimm	September 28	Washington Wizards	unknown
Reggie Jordan	September 28	Washington Wizards	Minnesota Timberwolves
Gerard King	September 28	Washington Wizards	San Antonio Spurs
Andrew Lang	September 28	New York Knicks	Chicago Bulls
Shandon Anderson	September 29	Houston Rockets	Utah Jazz
Benoit Benjamin	September 29	Los Angeles Lakers	Atenas de Córdoba (Argentina)
Jimmy King	September 29	Detroit Pistons	Quad City Thunder (CBA)
John Salley	September 29	Los Angeles Lakers	Panathinaikos (Greece)
Corliss Williamson	September 29	Sacramento Kings	
Torraye Braggs	September 30	Utah Jazz	unknown
Will Cunningham	September 30	Utah Jazz	Toronto Raptors
J. R. Henderson	September 30	Vancouver Grizzlies	
Bakari Hendrix	September 30	Utah Jazz	Quad City Thunder (CBA)
Jeff Hornacek	September 30	Utah Jazz	
Rick Hughes	September 30	Utah Jazz	Lebanon
Jermaine Jackson	September 30	Detroit Pistons	Detroit Titans
Roy Rogers	September 30	Denver Nuggets	Toronto Raptors
Jermaine Walker	September 30	Miami Heat	La Crosse Bobcats (CBA)
Jerod Ward	September 30	San Antonio Spurs	Grand Rapids Hoops (CBA)
Jamie Watson	September 30	Miami Heat	
Chucky Brown	October 1	San Antonio Spurs	Charlotte Hornets
Terry Dehere	October 1	Indiana Pacers	Vancouver Grizzlies
Derrick Dial	October 1	San Antonio Spurs	Peristeri B.C. (Greece)
Kevin Edwards	October 1	Minnesota Timberwolves	Orlando Magic
Ronnie Grandison	October 1	Minnesota Timberwolves	La Crosse Bobcats (CBA)
Stephen Howard	October 1	Los Angeles Lakers	unknown
Stephen Jackson	October 1	Vancouver Grizzlies	Fort Wayne Fury (CBA)
Malcolm Mackey	October 1	Vancouver Grizzlies	Sporting Athens (Greece)
Ricky Moore	October 1	Detroit Pistons	Connecticut Huskies
Ivano Newbill	October 1	New York Knicks	Washington Wizards
Lou Roe	October 1	Minnesota Timberwolves	Polti Cantù (Italy)
Mark Sanford	October 1	Sacramento Kings	Miami Heat
Antonio Smith	October 1	New York Knicks	Michigan State Spartans
Michael Smith	October 1	Washington Wizards	Vancouver Grizzlies
John Stockton	October 1	Utah Jazz	
Žan Tabak	October 1	Indiana Pacers	Fenerbahçe (Turkey)
Saddi Washington	October 1	Utah Jazz	
Trevor Winter	October 1	Minnesota Timberwolves	
Pete Chilcutt	October 2	Utah Jazz	Vancouver Grizzlies
Tyrone Corbin	October 2	Sacramento Kings	Atlanta Hawks
Brian Shaw	October 2	Houston Rockets (sign-and-trade)	Portland Trail Blazers
Alvin Sims	October 2	Utah Jazz	Phoenix Suns
Anthony Avent	October 3	Los Angeles Clippers	Utah Jazz
Charles Jones	October 3	Los Angeles Clippers	Chicago Bulls
Todd Lindeman	October 3	San Antonio Spurs	Indiana Pacers
Peter Aluma	October 4	Phoenix Suns	Sacramento Kings
Charles Barkley	October 4	Houston Rockets	
Maceo Baston	October 4	Chicago Bulls	Quad City Thunder (CBA)
Terrell Bell	October 4	Los Angeles Clippers	Sacramento Kings
Earl Boykins	October 4	Cleveland Cavaliers	Orlando Magic
Scott Brooks	October 4	Los Angeles Clippers	
Marcus Brown	October 4	Detroit Pistons	Pau-Orthez (France)
Mike Brown	October 4	Phoenix Suns	Olympiacos (Greece)
Monty Buckley	October 4	Portland Trail Blazers	
Mitchell Butler	October 4	Indiana Pacers	Cleveland Cavaliers
Adrian Caldwell	October 4	Indiana Pacers	Utah Jazz
Bill Curley	October 4	Golden State Warriors	Minnesota Timberwolves
Ben Davis	October 4	Phoenix Suns	Idaho Stampede (CBA)
Mark Davis	October 4	Golden State Warriors	La Crosse Bobcats (CBA)
Todd Day	October 4	Phoenix Suns	La Crosse Bobcats
Tony Farmer	October 4	Golden State Warriors	
Matt Fish	October 4	Cleveland Cavaliers	La Crosse Bobcats (CBA)
LaMarcus Golden	October 4	Phoenix Suns	Rapid City Thrillers (IBA)
Steve Goodrich	October 4	Philadelphia 76ers	UB La Palma (Spain)
Tyrone Grant	October 4	Charlotte Hornets	St. John's Red Storm
Zendon Hamilton	October 4	Dallas Mavericks	CB Valladolid (Spain)
Michael Hawkins	October 4	Detroit Pistons	Sacramento Kings
Derek Hood	October 4	Charlotte Hornets	Arkansas Razorbacks
Damon Jones	October 4	Golden State Warriors	Boston Celtics
Rich King	October 4	Vancouver Grizzlies	unknown
Antonio Lang	October 4	Toronto Raptors	Cleveland Cavaliers
Tim Legler	October 4	Golden State Warriors	Washington Wizards
Anthony Miller	October 4	Dallas Mavericks	Houston Rockets
Mikki Moore	October 4	Detroit Pistons	Fort Wayne Fury (CBA)
John Morton	October 4	Golden State Warriors	CB Granada (Spain)
Julius Nwosu	October 4	Utah Jazz	Avtodor Saratov (Russia)
Kevin Ollie	October 4	Dallas Mavericks	Orlando Magic
Chuck Person	October 4	Seattle SuperSonics	Charlotte Hornets
Jason Sasser	October 4	Dallas Mavericks	Vancouver Grizzlies
Steve Scheffler	October 4	Seattle SuperSonics	Yakima SunKings (CBA)
Tony Smith	October 4	Cleveland Cavaliers	Milwaukee Bucks
Joe Stephens	October 4	Vancouver Grizzlies	Houston Rockets
Jamel Thomas	October 4	Cleveland Cavaliers	Providence Friars
Robert Werdann	October 4	New Jersey Nets	Yakima SunKings (CBA)
Brandon Williams	October 4	Milwaukee Bucks	San Antonio Spurs
Korleone Young RFA	October 4	Philadelphia 76ers	Detroit Pistons (refused to match offer sheet)
Antonio Harvey	October 5	Portland Trail Blazers	unknown
Charles O'Bannon	October 5	Portland Trail Blazers	Detroit Pistons
Joe Kleine	October 6	Portland Trail Blazers	Phoenix Suns
Anthony Peeler	October 7	Minnesota Timberwolves	
Rodrick Rhodes	October 7	Philadelphia 76ers	Vancouver Grizzlies
Kebu Stewart	October 7	Dallas Mavericks	Vaqueros de Bayamón (Puerto Rico)
Kevin Willis	October 7	Toronto Raptors	
Ron Harper	October 13	Los Angeles Lakers	Chicago Bulls
Jimmy Oliver	October 14	New York Knicks	Phoenix Suns
Nikita Morgunov	October 15	Portland Trail Blazers	
Stacey Augmon	October 16	Portland Trail Blazers	
Anthony Miller	October 16	Minnesota Timberwolves	Dallas Mavericks
Stanley Roberts	October 19	Philadelphia 76ers	Houston Rockets
Mark West	October 19	Phoenix Suns	Atlanta Hawks
Danny Schayes	October 20	Minnesota Timberwolves	Orlando Magic
Brian Shaw	October 20	Los Angeles Lakers	Houston Rockets
Marty Conlon	October 21	Boston Celtics	Miami Heat
Sherman Douglas	October 21	New Jersey Nets	Los Angeles Clippers
Charles Shackleford	October 23	Dallas Mavericks	Milwaukee Bucks
Ira Bowman	October 26	Dallas Mavericks	Portland Trail Blazers
Robert Werdann	October 26	Vancouver Grizzlies	New Jersey Nets
Dedric Willoughby	October 28	Chicago Bulls	unknown
Randell Jackson	November 1	Dallas Mavericks	Washington Wizards
Rick Hughes	November 4	Dallas Mavericks	Utah Jazz
Doug Overton	November 8	Boston Celtics	Philadelphia 76ers
Michael Hawkins	November 9	Charlotte Hornets	Detroit Pistons
John Crotty	November 13	Detroit Pistons	Seattle SuperSonics
Earl Boykins	November 15	Orlando Magic	Cleveland Cavaliers
Kevin Ollie	November 24	Philadelphia 76ers	Dallas Mavericks
Chris Carr	December 1	Golden State Warriors	New Jersey Nets
Damon Jones	December 2	Dallas Mavericks	Golden State Warriors
Bill Curley	December 6	Golden State Warriors	
Devin Gray	December 10	Houston Rockets	Yakima SunKings (CBA)
Jamel Thomas	December 13	Boston Celtics	Cleveland Cavaliers
Brandon Williams	December 15	Atlanta Hawks	Milwaukee Bucks
Drew Barry	December 17	Golden State Warriors	Sydney Kings (Australia)
Marty Conlon	December 17	Los Angeles Clippers	Boston Celtics
Rusty LaRue	December 20	Chicago Bulls	
Kiwane Garris	December 21	Orlando Magic	unknown
Ben Davis	December 23	Phoenix Suns	Dallas Mavericks
Mark Hendrickson	December 27	Cleveland Cavaliers	New Jersey Nets?
Khalid Reeves	December 29	Chicago Bulls	Pau-Orthez (France)
Jamel Thomas	December 29	Golden State Warriors	Boston Celtics
Eric Riley	January 2	Minnesota Timberwolves (10-day contract)	Boston Celtics
Todd Day	January 3	Minnesota Timberwolves	Phoenix Suns
Greg Buckner	January 6	Dallas Mavericks (10-day contract)	Grand Rapids Hoops (CBA)
Kornél Dávid	January 6	Cleveland Cavaliers (10-day contract)	Chicago Bulls
Sam Mack	January 6	Golden State Warriors	Houston Rockets
Matt Maloney	January 6	Chicago Bulls	Houston Rockets
Anthony Miller	January 6	Houston Rockets (10-day contract)	Minnesota Timberwolves
Ben Davis	January 7	Phoenix Suns (10-day contract)	
Kiwane Garris	January 7	Orlando Magic	
Armen Gilliam	January 7	Utah Jazz	Orlando Magic
Devin Gray	January 7	Houston Rockets (10-day contract)	
Eric Riley	January 7	Minnesota Timberwolves (10-day contract)	
Mark Hendrickson	January 8	Cleveland Cavaliers (10-day contract)	
Damon Jones	January 8	Dallas Mavericks (10-day contract)	
Jamel Thomas	January 9	Golden State Warriors (10-day contract)	
Chris Carr	January 10	Chicago Bulls (10-day contract)	Golden State Warriors
Dedric Willoughby	January 10	Chicago Bulls (10-day contract)	
Sam Jacobsen	January 11	Golden State Warriors (10-day contract)	Los Angeles Lakers
Bill Curley	January 13	Houston Rockets (10-day contract)	Golden State Warriors
Antonio Lang	January 14	Toronto Raptors (10-day contract)	Fort Wayne Fury (CBA)
Greg Buckner	January 16	Dallas Mavericks (2nd 10-day contract)	
Kornél Dávid	January 16	Cleveland Cavaliers (2nd 10-day contract)	
Anthony Miller	January 16	Houston Rockets (2nd 10-day contract)	
Devin Gray	January 17	Houston Rockets (2nd 10-day contract)	
Pete Chilcutt	January 18	Los Angeles Clippers (10-day contract)	Cleveland Cavaliers
Mark Hendrickson	January 18	Cleveland Cavaliers (2nd 10-day contract)	
Damon Jones	January 18	Dallas Mavericks (2nd 10-day contract)	
Mark Davis	January 19	Golden State Warriors (10-day contract)	La Crosse Bobcats (CBA)
Chris Carr	January 20	Chicago Bulls (2nd 10-day contract)	
Sam Jacobsen	January 21	Golden State Warriors (2nd 10-day contract)	
Bill Curley	January 23	Houston Rockets (2nd 10-day contract)	
Antonio Lang	January 25	Toronto Raptors (2nd 10-day contract)	
Greg Buckner	January 26	Dallas Mavericks (signed for rest of season)	
Anthony Miller	January 26	Houston Rockets (signed for rest of season)	
Devin Gray	January 27	Houston Rockets (signed for rest of season)	
Damon Jones	January 28	Dallas Mavericks (signed for rest of season)	
Mark Davis	January 29	Golden State Warriors (2nd 10-day contract)	
Chris Carr	January 30	Chicago Bulls (signed for rest of season)	
Sam Jacobsen	January 31	Golden State Warriors (signed for rest of season)	
Pete Chilcutt	January 31	Cleveland Cavaliers (10-day contract)	Los Angeles Clippers
Dennis Rodman	February 3	Dallas Mavericks	Los Angeles Lakers
Chucky Brown	February 8	Charlotte Hornets (claimed off waiver)	San Antonio Spurs
Earl Boykins	February 8	Cleveland Cavaliers (10-day contract)	Orlando Magic
Moochie Norris	February 8	Houston Rockets (10-day contract)	Fort Wayne Fury (CBA)
Haywoode Workman	February 9	Toronto Raptors (claimed off waiver)	Milwaukee Bucks
Pete Chilcutt	February 14	Cleveland Cavaliers (2nd 10-day contracy)	
Mirsad Türkcan	February 16	Milwaukee Bucks	New York Knicks
Earl Boykins	February 18	Cleveland Cavaliers (2nd 10-day contract)	
Moochie Norris	February 18	Houston Rockets (2nd 10-day contract)	
Etdrick Bohannon	February 20	New York Knicks (10-day contract)	Washington Wizards
Lari Ketner	February 22	Cleveland Cavaliers (10-day contract)	Chicago Bulls
Bruce Bowen	February 23	Miami Heat (claimed off waiver)	Chicago Bulls
Ira Bowman	February 24	Philadelphia 76ers (10-day contract)	Dallas Mavericks
Donny Marshall	February 25	Cleveland Cavaliers (10-day contract)	Connecticut Pride (CBA)
Isaac Fontaine	February 25	Cleveland Cavaliers	Connecticut Pride (CBA)
Jeff McInnis	February 26	Los Angeles Clippers (10-day contract)	Quad City Thunder (CBA)
Pete Chilcutt	February 26	Los Angeles Clippers (10-day contract)	Cleveland Cavaliers
Earl Boykins	February 28	Cleveland Cavaliers (signed for rest of season)	
Moochie Norris	February 28	Houston Rockets (signed for rest of season)	
Etdrick Bohannon	March 1	New York Knicks (2nd 10-day contract)	
Don MacLean	March 2	Phoenix Suns	Houston Rockets
Lari Ketner	March 3	Cleveland Cavaliers (second 10-day contract)	
Ira Bowman	March 5	Philadelphia 76ers (second 10-day contract)	
Donny Marshall	March 6	Cleveland Cavaliers (second 10-day contract)	
Mario Bennett	March 7	Los Angeles Clippers (10-day contract)	Chicago Bulls
Pete Chilcutt	March 7	Los Angeles Clippers (2nd 10-day contract)	
Jeff McInnis	March 7	Los Angeles Clippers (2nd 10-day contract)	
Lari Ketner	March 13	Cleveland Cavaliers (signed for rest of season)	
Don MacLean	March 13	Phoenix Suns (10-day contract)	
Don Reid	March 13	Washington Wizards	Detroit Pistons
Ira Bowman	March 15	Philadelphia 76ers (signed for rest of season)	
Jeff McInnis	March 17	Los Angeles Clippers (signed for rest of season)	
Bill Curley	March 20	Golden State Warriors	Houston Rockets
Mark Davis	March 22	Golden State Warriors	
Don MacLean	March 23	Phoenix Suns (second 10-day contract)	
Kevin Johnson	March 24	Phoenix Suns (came out of retirement)	
Antonio Lang	March 24	Philadelphia 76ers (10-day contract)	Toronto Raptors
Drew Barry	March 27	Atlanta Hawks	Golden State Warriors
Etdrick Bohannon	March 27	Los Angeles Clippers (10-day contract)	New York Knicks
Don MacLean	April 2	Phoenix Suns (signed for rest of season)	
Antonio Lang	April 3	Philadelphia 76ers (signed for rest of season)	
Etdrick Bohannon	April 6	Los Angeles Clippers (signed for rest of season)	
Mark Hendrickson	April 7	New Jersey Nets (10-day contract)	Cleveland Cavaliers
Rodrick Rhodes	April 10	Dallas Mavericks	Philadelphia 76ers
Jamel Thomas	April 14	Portland Trail Blazers	Golden State Warriors
Maceo Baston	April 19	Milwaukee Bucks	Quad City Thunder (CBA)

== Draft ==
=== 1st Round ===
Pick	Player	Date signed	Team	School/club team
1	Elton Brand	July 26	Chicago Bulls	Duke (So.)
2	Steve Francis	September 15	Vancouver Grizzlies	Maryland (Jr.)
3	Baron Davis	July 12	Charlotte Hornets	UCLA (So.)
4	Lamar Odom	August 12	Los Angeles Clippers	Rhode Island (Fr.)
5	Jonathan Bender	August 5	Indiana Pacers	Picayune Memorial HS (HS Sr.)
6	Wally Szczerbiak	August 1	Minnesota Timberwolves	Miami (OH) (Sr.)
7	Richard Hamilton	September 7	Washington Wizards	Connecticut (Jr.)
8	Andre Miller	July 12	Cleveland Cavaliers	Utah (Sr.)
9	Shawn Marion	July 29	Phoenix Suns	UNLV (Jr.)
10	Jason Terry	July 11	Atlanta Hawks	Arizona (Sr.)
11	Trajan Langdon	July 12	Cleveland Cavaliers	Duke (Sr.)
12	Aleksandar Radojević	October 4	Toronto Raptors	Barton County CC (So.)
13	Corey Maggette	July 12	Orlando Magic	Duke (Fr.)
14	William Avery	July 20	Minnesota Timberwolves	Duke (So.)
15	Frédéric Weis		New York Knicks	Limoges
16	Ron Artest	July 15	Chicago Bulls	St. John's (So.)
17	Cal Bowdler	July 11	Atlanta Hawks	Old Dominion (Sr.)
18	James Posey	July 19	Denver Nuggets	Xavier (Jr.)
19	Quincy Lewis	July 20	Utah Jazz	Minnesota (Sr.)
20	Dion Glover	July 15	Atlanta Hawks	Georgia Tech (So.)
21	Jeff Foster	July 13	Indiana Pacers	Southwest Texas State (Sr.)
22	Kenny Thomas	August 13	Houston Rockets	New Mexico (Sr.)
23	Devean George	October 9	Los Angeles Lakers	Augsburg (Sr.)
24	Andrei Kirilenko	July 7	Utah Jazz	CSKA Moscow (Russia)
25	Tim James	August 24	Miami Heat	Miami (Sr.)
26	Vonteego Cummings	September 1	Golden State Warriors	Pittsburgh (Sr.)
27	Jumaine Jones	July 15	Philadelphia 76ers	Georgia (So.)
28	Scott Padgett	August 7	Utah Jazz	Kentucky (Sr.)
29	Leon Smith	November 1	Dallas Mavericks	King College Prep HS (Sr.)

=== 2nd round ===
Pick	Player	Date signed	Team	School/club team
30	John Celestand	September 27	Los Angeles Lakers	Villanova (Sr.)
31	Rico Hill	October 4	Los Angeles Clippers	Illinois State (Jr.)
32	Michael Ruffin	August 24	Chicago Bulls	Tulsa (Sr.)
33	Chris Herren	September 8	Denver Nuggets	Fresno State (Sr.)
34	Evan Eschmeyer	August 10	New Jersey Nets	Northwestern (Sr.)
35	Calvin Booth	September 7	Washington Wizards	Penn State (Sr.)
36	Wang Zhizhi		Dallas Mavericks	Bayi Rockets (China)
37	Obinna Ekezie	September 14	Vancouver Grizzlies	Maryland (Sr.)
38	Laron Profit	September 28	Washington Wizards	Maryland (Sr.)
39	A. J. Bramlett	October 4	Cleveland Cavaliers	Arizona (Sr.)
40	Gordan Giriček		Dallas Mavericks	CSKA Moscow (Russia)
41	Francisco Elson	July 9	Denver Nuggets	California (Sr.)
42	Louis Bullock	September 29	Minnesota Timberwolves	Michigan (Sr.)
43	Lee Nailon		Charlotte Hornets	TCU (Sr.)
44	Tyrone Washington		Houston Rockets	Miss State (Sr.)
45	Ryan Robertson	August 27	Sacramento Kings	Kansas (Sr.)
46	J. R. Koch	October 4	New York Knicks	Iowa (Sr.)
47	Todd MacCulloch	September 15	Philadelphia 76ers	Washington (Sr.)
48	Galen Young	October 4	Milwaukee Bucks	Charlotte (Sr.)
49	Lari Ketner	August 24	Chicago Bulls	UMass (Sr.)
50	Venson Hamilton		Houston Rockets	Nebraska (Sr.)
51	Antwain Smith	October 4	Vancouver Grizzlies	Saint Paul's (Sr.)
52	Roberto Bergersen	October 4	Portland Trail Blazers	Boise State (Sr.)
53	Rodney Buford	September 30	Miami Heat	Creighton (Sr.)
54	Melvin Levett	September 29	Los Angeles Lakers	Cincinnati (Sr.)
55	Kris Clack		Boston Celtics	Texas (Sr.)
56	Tim Young	September 1	Golden State Warriors	Stanford (Sr.)
57	Manu Ginóbili		San Antonio Spurs	Viola Reggio Calabria (Italy)
58	Eddie Lucas	September 23	Utah Jazz	Virginia Tech (Sr.)
