= Continental Basketball Association statistical leaders =

The Continental Basketball Association statistical leaders are the statistical leaders in various different categories of the American professional club basketball league, which ceased operations after the 2008–09 season.

== Key ==
Player (X)		Denotes the number of times the player had been the statistical leader up to and including that season			
G	Guard	F	Forward	C	Center

== Annual scoring leaders ==
Season	Player	Pos (Note: The player's primary position is listed first.)	Team	Games played	Field goals made	3-point field goals made	Free throws made	Total points	Points per game	Ref
1978–79	Ron Davis	F	Anchorage Northern Knights	48	566	3	301	1436	29.9	
1979–80	Ron Davis (2)	F	Anchorage Northern Knights	45	562	10	307	1441	32.0	
1980–81	Jacky Dorsey	F	Maine Lumberjacks	26	341	0	128	810	31.2	
1981–82	Ron Davis (3)	F	Anchorage Northern Knights	31	436	12	203	1087	35.1	
1982–83	Ron Davis (4)	F	Billings Volcanos	27	322	7	167	818	30.3	
1983–84	Tico Brown	G	Detroit Spirits	44	482	11	235	1210	27.5	
1984–85	Dwight Anderson	G	Albuquerque Silvers	43	415	10	295	1135	26.4	
1985–86	Don Collins	F/G	Tampa Bay Thrillers	34	432	4	205	1073	31.6	
1986–87	Tico Brown (2)	G	Savannah Spirits	46	580	35	244	1439	31.3	
1987–88	Tommy Davis	G	Pensacola Tornados	48	498	76	349	1421	29.6	
1988–89	Brook Steppe	G/F	Pensacola Tornados	41	349	77	277	1052	25.7	
1989–90	Derrick Gervin	F	Santa Barbara Islanders	40	511	2	243	1267	31.7	
1990–91	Tony Dawson	F	Pensacola Tornados	35	370	28	286	1054	30.1	
1991–92	Stephen Thompson	G	Oklahoma City Cavalry	39	394	8	208	1004	25.7	
1992–93	Tim Legler	G	Omaha Racers	39	384	53	238	1059	27.2	
1993–94	Brian Oliver	G	Rockford Lightning	43	383	2	212	980	22.8	
1994–95	Jerome Harmon	G	Fort Wayne Fury	42	470	1	234	1175	28.0	
1995–96	Tracy Moore	G/F	Shreveport Storm	49	427	127	285	1266	25.8	
1996–97	Gaylon Nickerson	G	Oklahoma City Cavalry	41	345	78	155	923	22.5	
1997–98	Jason Sasser	F	Sioux Falls Skyforce	49	401	24	284	1110	22.7	
1998–99	Damon Jones	G	Idaho Stampede	35	269	120	100	758	21.7	
1999–00	Brandon Williams	G	La Crosse Bobcats	46	334	45	200	913	19.8	
2000–01	Jamel Thomas	G/F	Quad City Thunder	21	189	34	79	491	23.4	
2001–02	Sean Colson	G	Grand Rapids Hoops	50	402	107	272	1183	23.7	
2002–03	Ronnie Fields	G	Rockford Lightning	48	406	60	243	1115	23.2	
2003–04	Ronnie Fields (2)	G	Rockford Lightning	43	397	83	195	1072	24.9	
2004–05	Sam Mack	G/F	Michigan Mayhem	31	251	71	109	682	22.0	
2005–06	T. J. Thompson	G	Albany Patroons	47	401	155	237	1194	25.4	
2006–07	Shaun Fountain	G	Indiana Alley Cats	47	413	53	200	1079	23.0	
2007–08	Josh Pace	G/F	East Kentucky Miners	45	411	17	196	1035	23.0	
2008–09	Harvey Thomas	F	Albany Patroons	11	97	13	51	258	23.5	

=== Players with most top-scorer awards ===
Player	Awards	Editions
(United States) Ron Davis	4	1979, 1980, 1982, 1983
(United States) Ronie Fields	2	2003, 2004
(United States) Tico Brown	2	1984, 1987

== Annual rebounding leaders ==
Season	Player	Pos.	Team	Games played	Offensive rebounds	Defensive rebounds	Total rebounds	Rebounds per game	Ref
1978–79	Sylvester Cuyler	F	Rochester Zeniths	41	–	–	570	13.9	
1979–80	Jim Bostic	C	Lancaster Red Roses	34	–	–	456	13.4	
1980–81	Jacky Dorsey	F	Maine Lumberjacks	26	–	–	431	16.6	
1981–82	Jacky Dorsey (2)	F	Maine Lumberjacks	44	–	–	611	13.9	
1982–83	Clarence Kea	F	Detroit Spirits	38	–	–	524	13.8	
1983–84	Bob Miller	C	Louisville Catbirds	27	–	–	345	12.8	
1984–85	Geoff Crompton	C	Puerto Rico Coquis	24	–	–	326	13.6	
1985–86	Ken Green	F	Florida Stingers	48	–	–	623	13.0	
1986–87	Joe Binion	F	Topeka Sizzlers	32	–	–	445	13.9	
1987–88	Michael Brooks	F	Albany Patroons	51	–	–	609	11.9	
1988–89	Jerome Henderson	C	Topeka Sizzlers	43	–	–	537	12.5	
1989–90	David Boone	F	San Jose Jammers	49	–	–	665	13.6	
1990–91	Jim Rowinski	F/C	Yakima SunKings	46	139	372	511	11.1	
1991–92	Stanley Brundy	F	Rapid City Thrillers	45	232	269	501	11.1	
1992–93	Stanley Brundy (2)	F	Rapid City Thrillers	51	240	362	602	11.8	
1993–94	Jerome Lane	F/C	La Crosse Catbirds, Rapid City Thrillers	46	207	392	599	13.0	
1994–95	Jerome Lane (2)	F/C	Oklahoma City Cavalry	56	238	422	660	11.8	
1995–96	Jerome Lane (3)	F/C	Oklahoma City Cavalry	55	287	637	924	16.8	
1996–97	Anthony Tucker	F	Florida Beach Dogs	56	195	369	564	10.1	
1997–98	Devin Davis	F	Idaho Stampede	46	160	291	451	9.8	
1998–99	Jerome Lane (4)	F/C	Idaho Stampede	34	179	313	492	14.5	
1999–00	Nick Davis	F	Sioux Falls Skyforce	56	231	423	654	11.7	
2000–01	Kirk King	F	Connecticut Pride	24	73	177	250	10.4	
2001–02	Dickey Simpkins	F	Rockford Lightning	26	91	218	309	11.9	
2002–03	Damian Cantrell	F	Yakima Sun Kings	34	151	283	434	12.8	
2003–04	Leon Smith	C	Great Lakes Storm, Gary Steelheads	30	106	261	367	12.2	
2004–05	Charles Gaines	F/C	Michigan Mayhem	44	173	329	502	11.4	
2005–06	Eric Chenowith	C	Idaho Stampede	47	141	454	595	12.7	
2006–07	Nick VanderLaan	C	Butte Daredevils	47	171	379	550	11.7	
2007–08	Steven Thomas	F	Atlanta Krunk, East Kentucky Miners	30	99	243	342	11.4	
2008–09	Galen Young	F	East Kentucky Miners	8	20	60	80	10.0	

== Annual assists leaders ==
Season	Player	Position	Team	Games played	Total assists	Assists per game	References
1978–79	Andre McCarter	G	Rochester Zeniths	48	466	9.7	
1979–80	Andre McCarter (2)	G	Utica Olympics	30	260	8.7	
1980–81	Greg Jackson	G	Lehigh Valley Jets	40	449	11.2	
1981–82	Andre McCarter (3)	G	Atlantic City Hi-Rollers	45	376	8.4	
1982–83	Robert Smith	G	Montana Golden Nuggets	44	414	9.4	
1983–84	Walker Russell	G	Detroit Spirits	30	270	9.0	
1984–85	Del Beshore	G	Wyoming Wildcatters	48	482	10.0	
1985–86	Bryan Warrick	G	Wisconsin Flyers	29	287	9.9	
1986–87	Alvin Dukes	G	Savannah Spirits	48	465	9.7	
1987–88	Mark Wade	G	Pensacola Tornados	37	417	11.3	
1988–89	Mark Wade (2)	G	Pensacola Tornados	54	626	11.6	
1989–90	Corey Gaines	G	Omaha Racers	48	556	11.6	
1990–91	Mark Wade (3)	G	Pensacola Tornados	53	571	10.8	
1991–92	David Rivers	G	La Crosse Catbirds	32	414	13.0	
1992–93	David Rivers (2)	G	La Crosse Catbirds	43	514	12.0	
1993–94	Cedric Hunter	G	Sioux Falls Skyforce	51	479	9.4	
1994–95	Greg Grant	G	Mexico City Aztecas, Pittsburgh Piranhas	33	322	9.8	
1995–96	Charles Smith	G	Florida Beach Dogs	43	326	7.6	
1996–97	Michael Hawkins	G	Rockford Lightning	35	325	9.3	
1997–98	Gerald Madkins	G	Rockford Lightning	31	275	8.9	
1998–99	Damon Bailey	G	Fort Wayne Fury	44	297	6.8	
1999–00	Rusty LaRue	G	Idaho Stampede	38	318	8.4	
2000–01	David Vanterpool	G/F	Yakima SunKings	22	185	8.4	
2001–02	Sean Colson	G	Grand Rapids Hoops	50	396	7.9	
2002–03	Tyson Wheeler	G	Great Lakes Storm, Yakima SunKings	46	378	8.2	
2003–04	Jemeil Rich	G	Gary Steelheads	47	498	10.6	
2004–05	Jemeil Rich (2)	G	Gary Steelheads	42	409	9.7	
2005–06	Corey Williams	G	Sioux Falls Skyforce	27	264	9.8	
2006–07	Galen Young	F	Yakima SunKings	46	304	6.6	
2007–08	Moochie Norris	G	Yakima SunKings	38	340	8.9	
2008–09	Shaun Fountain	G	Albany Patroons	15	79	5.3	

== Annual steals leaders ==
Season	Player	Position	Team	Games played	Total steals	Steals per game	References
1978–79	Carl Winfree	G	Lancaster Red Roses	28	89	3.2	
1979–80	Glenn Hagan	G	Rochester Zeniths	46	148	3.2	
1980–81	Glenn Hagan (2)	G	Rochester Zeniths	40	138	3.5	
1981–82	Ed Sherod	G	Lancaster Lightning	45	148	3.3	
1982–83	Willie Smith	G	Rochester Zeniths	42	110	2.6	
1983–84	Del Beshore	G	Wyoming Wildcatters	44	141	3.2	
1984–85	Joe Dawson	F	Bay State Bombardiers	48	121	2.5	
1985–86	Clinton Wheeler	G	Albany Patroons	47	184	3.9	
1986–87	Alvin Dukes	G	Savannah Spirits	48	159	3.3	
1987–88	Sidney Lowe	G	Albany Patroons	50	139	2.8	
1988–89	Derrick Taylor	G	Wichita Falls Texans	49	172	3.5	
1989–90	Brent Carmichael	G	Rockford Lightning	56	163	2.9	
1990–91	A. J. Wynder	G	Cedar Rapids Silver Bullets, Quad City Thunder	53	161	3.0	
1991–92	Barry Mitchell	F	Quad City Thunder	55	160	2.9	
1992–93	Greg Sutton	G	Fargo-Moorhead Fever, Fort Wayne Fury	52	138	2.7	
1993–94	Michael Anderson	G	Tri-City Chinook	41	112	2.7	
1994–95	Sebastian Neal	F	Omaha Racers	53	103	1.9	
1995–96	Reggie Jordan	G	Sioux Falls Skyforce	38	92	2.4	
1996–97	Michael Hawkins	G	Rockford Lightning	35	82	2.3	
1997–98	Melvin Newbern	G	Sioux Falls Skyforce	44	108	2.5	
1998–99	James Blackwell	G	La Crosse Bobcats	47	120	2.6	
1999–00	Moochie Norris	G	Fort Wayne Fury	33	78	2.4	
2000–01	Chris Garner	G	Quad City Thunder	21	92	4.4	
2001–02	Kevin Rice	G	Dakota Wizards	38	101	2.7	
2002–03	Ronnie Fields	G	Rockford Lightning	48	125	2.6	
2003–04	Ronnie Fields (2)	G	Rockford Lightning	43	137	3.2	
2004–05	Jemeil Rich	G	Gary Steelheads	42	117	2.8	
2005–06	Ronnie Fields (3)	G	Rockford Lightning	47	109	2.3	
2006–07	Shaun Fountain	G	Indiana Alley Cats	47	118	2.5	
2007–08	Ronnie Fields (4)	G	Minot SkyRockets	42	115	2.7	
2008–09	Jermaine Blackburn	G/F	East Kentucky Miners	8	18	2.3	

== Annual blocks leaders ==
Season	Player	Position	Team(s)	Games played	Total blocks	Blocks per game	References
1978–79	Dean Tolson	F	Anchorage Northern Knights	44	136	3.1	
1979–80	Charles Jones	C	Maine Lumberjacks	39	185	4.7	
1980–81	Lee Johnson	C	Rochester Zeniths	29	108	3.7	
1981–82	Brad Branson	C	Anchorage Northern Knights	45	119	2.6	
1982–83	Charles Jones (2)	C	Maine Lumberjacks	24	95	4.0	
1983–84	Charles Jones (3)	C	Bay State Bombardiers	37	130	3.5	
1984–85	Kirk Richards	C	Bay State Bombardiers	47	175	3.7	
1985–86	Brian Martin	F/C	Tampa Bay Thrillers	37	106	2.9	
1986–87	Curtis Kitchen	F/C	Albany Patroons	42	141	3.4	
1987–88	Ron Cavenall	C	Wyoming Wildcatters	54	170	3.1	
1988–89	John Campbell	C	La Crosse Catbirds	41	123	3.0	
1989–90	Ozell Jones	C	Tulsa Fast Breakers	53	156	2.9	
1990–91	Kenny Green	F	Columbus Horizon, Quad City Thunder, Rapid City Thrillers	41	127	3.1	
1991–92	Jawann Oldham	C	Tulsa Zone	49	160	3.3	
1992–93	Mike Bell	F	Oklahoma City Cavalry	37	140	3.8	
1993–94	Bo Outlaw	C	Grand Rapids Hoops	32	121	3.8	
1994–95	Mike Bell (2)	F	Rockford Lightning, Quad City Thunder	55	188	3.4	
1995–96	Michael McDonald	C	Grand Rapids Mackers	49	91	1.9	
1996–97	Jimmy Carruth	F	Fort Wayne Fury	50	190	3.8	
1997–98	Jimmy Carruth (2)	F	Fort Wayne Fury	24	82	3.4	
1998–99	Nick Davis	F	Sioux Falls Skyforce	54	105	1.9	
1999–00	Art Long	F/C	Yakima SunKings	45	117	2.6	
2000–01	Korleone Young	F	Rockford Lightning	25	60	2.4	
2001–02	Johnny Tyson	C	Fargo-Moorhead Beez, Sioux Falls Skyforce	40	78	2.0	
2002–03	Oliver Miller	C	Gary Steelheads, Dakota Wizards	43	106	2.5	
2003–04	Leon Smith	C	Great Lakes Storm, Gary Steelheads	30	53	1.8	
2004–05	Keith Closs	C	Gary Steelheads, Rockford Lightning	41	156	3.8	
2005–06	Noel Felix	F/C	Sioux Falls Skyforce	41	80	2.0	
2006–07	Kenyon Gamble	C	Minot SkyRockets	47	151	3.2	
2007–08	Johnny Tyson (2)	C	Rio Grande Valley Silverados	32	60	1.9	
2008–09	Elvin Mims	G/F	Lawton-Fort Sill Cavalry	14	24	1.7	

== Career scoring leaders ==
The table includes the all-time scoring leaders of the EPBL (Eastern Pennsylvania Basketball League 1946–48, and Eastern Professional Basketball League 1948–70), the EBA (Eastern Basketball Association 1970–78) and the CBA (1978–2009).

Rank	Player	Position(s)	League(s)	Total points
1	Tico Brown	G	CBA	8,538
2	Willie Simms	F	CBA	8,320
3	Julius McCoy	F	EPBL	7,754
4	Stacey Arceneaux	F	EPBL	7,735
5	Tom Hemans	F	EPBL	7,641
6	Hal Lear	G	EPBL	6,876
7	Kenny Natt	G	CBA	6,281
8	Cedric Hunter	G	CBA	6,205
9	Ronnie Fields	G	CBA	6,040
10	Derrick Rowland	G	CBA	5,783
11	Kermit Holmes	F	CBA	5,760
12	Tracy Moore	G/F	CBA	5,757
13	Stan Pawlak	G	EPBL/EBA	5,729
14	Ron Davis	F	EBA/CBA	5,673
15	Tim Legler	G	CBA	5,604
16	Bill Spivey	C	EPBL	5,530
17	Carl Thomas	G	CBA	5,479
18	Dick Gaines	G	EPBL	5,473
19	Kelsey Weems	G	CBA	5,457
20	Richie Cornwall	G	EPBL/EBA/CBA	5,260

== Bibliography ==
- Anderson, Greg (1991). 1991–92 Official CBA Guide & Register. Continental Basketball Association.
