= Jermaine Blackburn =

American basketball player

Personal information
- Born: February 8, 1983 (age 43) St. Louis, Missouri, U.S.
- Listed height: 6 ft 7 in (2.01 m)
- Listed weight: 210 lb (95 kg)

Career information
- High school: Hazelwood Central (Florissant, Missouri)
- College: Missouri State-West Plains (2001–2003); Boise State (2003–2005)
- NBA draft: 2005: undrafted
- Playing career: 2005–2015
- Position: Small forward / shooting guard
- Number: 24

Career history
- 2005: West Sydney Razorbacks
- 2005–2007: Idaho Stampede
- 2007: Gary Steelheads
- 2007–2008: Yakama Sun Kings
- 2008: Snohomish County Explosion
- 2008–2009: East Kentucky Miners
- 2009–2010: Southeast Texas Mavericks
- 2011: Lawton-Fort Sill Cavalry
- 2011: Portland Chinooks
- 2011–2012: Laval Kebs
- 2012: Saint John Mill Rats
- 2012–2013: London Lightning
- 2013–2014: Saint John Mill Rats
- 2014: Portland Chinooks
- 2014: Shreveport-Bossier Mavericks

Career highlights
- CBA steals leader (2009); Recorded first ever CBA quadruple-double; CBA All-Star (2008)

Jermaine Blackburn (born February 8, 1983) is an American former basketball player. He is best known for recording the Continental Basketball Association's first-ever quadruple-double. On December 20, 2008, Blackburn was playing for the East Kentucky Miners against the West Virginia Wild. He compiled 22 points, 10 rebounds, 14 assists and 10 steals. Remarkably, he followed this performance with a triple-double in his very next game, recording 22 points, 10 rebounds and 13 assists against the same West Virginia team.

== College ==
Blackburn, a native of St. Louis, Missouri, played junior college basketball for two seasons after graduating from Hazelwood Central High School. He played at Missouri State University-West Plains before transferring to the Boise State Broncos of the Western Athletic Conference, an NCAA Division I school. In his first season at Boise State, he helped the Broncos reach the Sweet 16 of the 2004 National Invitation Tournament. The following year, Blackburn's senior season in 2004–05, he led his team in scoring at 15.4 points per game. As a #8 seed in the WAC men's basketball tournament, Boise State reached the championship game before losing to #2 UTEP, 91–78.

== Professional ==
Since 2005, Blackburn has played in various professional and semi-professional basketball leagues. His most notable former team is the West Sydney Razorbacks who played in the NBL. He was released after just 11 games for the Razorbacks. Other stints have included the CBA for the East Kentucky Miners and Yakama Sun Kings (for whom he was a CBA All-Star in 2008), the American Basketball Association for the Southeast Texas Mavericks, the Snohomish County Explosion in the International Basketball League as well as the NBA Development League's Idaho Stampede.

For the inaugural 2011–12 National Basketball League of Canada season, Blackburn split the season between the Quebec Kebs and the Saint John Mill Rats. For 2012–13, Blackburn played for the London Lightning. He returned to the Mill Rats before the start of the 2013-14 NBL Canada season.

== Personal ==
Blackburn married Jodi Bell on August 10, 2013. He has one daughter, Janess, from a previous marriage.
