= 1997 CBA All-Star Game =

National Conference	American Conference
98	107
- Date: January 22, 1997
- Venue: Yakima SunDome, Yakima
- MVP: Dexter Boney
- Attendance: 4,043

The 1997 Continental Basketball Association All-Star Game was the 35th All-Star Game organised by the Continental Basketball Association since its inception in 1949. It was held at the Yakima SunDome in Yakima, Washington on January 22, 1997, in front of 4,043 spectators. The American Conference defeated the National Conference 107–98.

Dexter Boney was named the MVP. Thirty NBA scouts attended the match.

It was coach Eric Musselman's fifth and final appearance in the All-Star Game, while 3-time NBA champion Stacey King and one-time Jack Haley (both with Chicago Bulls), made their first.

It was the last edition before a 3-year hiatus, with event returning in 2000.

== The 1997 CBA All-Star Game events ==
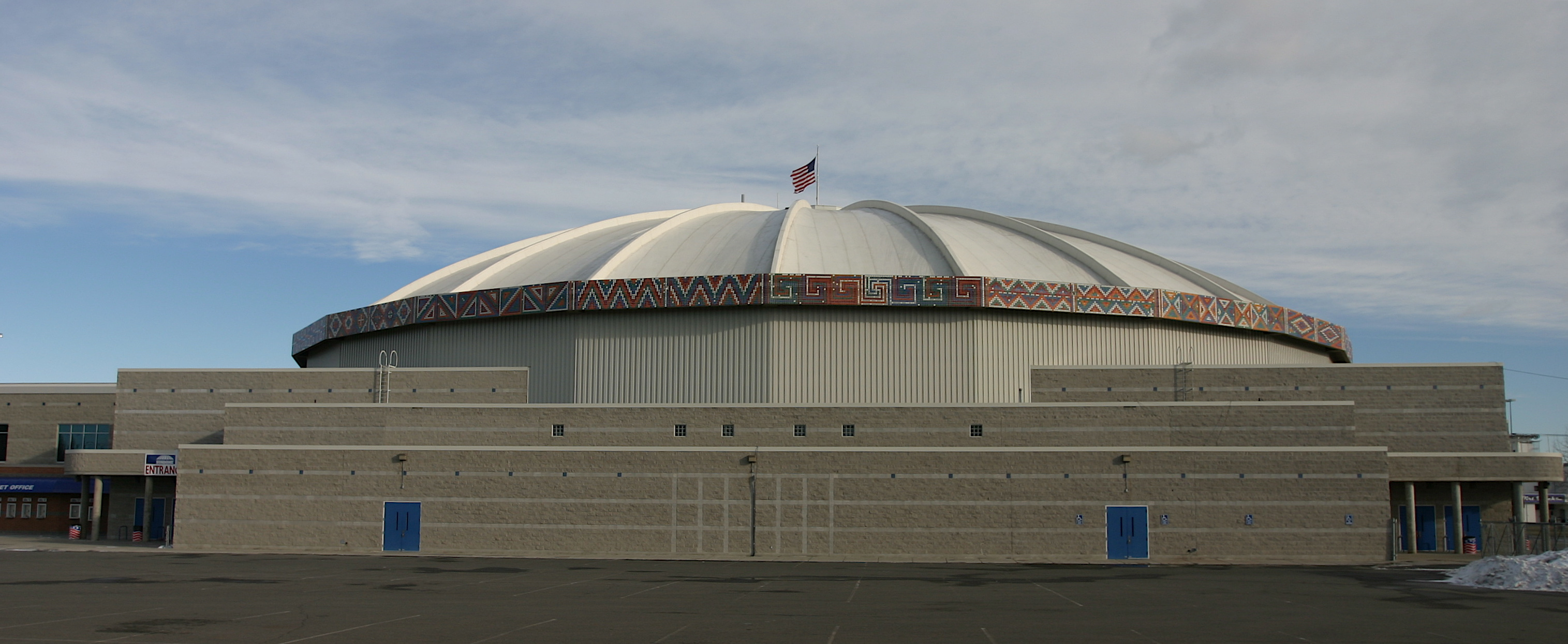
The Yakima Sundome venue.

=== CBA Long Distance Shootout ===
Tony Harris of Sioux Falls Skyforce was the winner.

=== Slum-dunk ===
Ronnie Fields of La Crosse Bobcats was the winner.

=== The Game ===
Dexter Boney of Florida Beachdogs was the top scorer of the match with 25 pts for the American Conference. He was voted the MVP with 175 votes, while Aaron Williams -who played 23 minutes and scored 13 points- finished third with 39 votes.

On the other side, Reggie Slater was the top scorer for the National Conference with 17 pts and Gaylon Nickerson scored 10. Also Tony Harris had 9 pts, Stacey King had 5 and Devin Gray scored 10.

== All-Star teams ==
=== Rosters ===
National Conference
Pos.	Player	Team	Previous appearances
Team
F	(United States) Reggie Slater	La Crosse Bobcats	
G	(United States) Stevin Smith	Sioux Falls Skyforce	
G	(United States) Gaylon Nickerson	Oklahoma City Cavalry	
C	(United States) Stacey King	Sioux Falls Skyforce	
G	(United States) Jack Haley	La Crosse Bobcats	
F	(United States) Devin Gray	Sioux Falls Skyforce	
G	(United States) Tony Harris	Sioux Falls Skyforce	
Head coach:

American Conference
Pos.	Player	Team	Previous appearances
Team
C	(United States) Aaron Williams	Connecticut Pride	
G	(United States) Dexter Boney	Florida Beachdogs	
F	(United States) Reggie Jackson	Rockford Lightning	
G	(United States) Michael Hawkins	Rockford Lightning	
G	(United States) Herb Jones	Florida Beachdogs	
Head coach: (United States) Eric Musselman (Florida Beachdogs)

=== Result ===
Team 1	Score	Team 2
National Conference	98 - 107	American Conference

== Awards ==
MVP	Topscorer	Slam-dunk champion	Long Distance Shootout Winner
(United States) Dexter Boney	(United States) Dexter Boney	(United States) Ronnie Fields	(United States) Tony Harris

== See also ==
- 1996 CBA All-Star Game
- Continental Basketball Association
