= 1996 CBA All-Star Game =

| American Conference | National Conference |
|---|---|
| 105 | 121 |
- Date: January 17, 1996
- Venue: Sioux Falls Arena, Sioux Falls
- MVP: Shelton Jones

The 1996 Continental Basketball Association All-Star Game was the 34th All-Star Game organised by CBA since its inception in 1949. It was held at the Sioux Falls Arena in Sioux Falls, South Dakota on January 17, 1996. The National Conference defeated the American Conference 121–105.

Shelton Jones was named the MVP, while it was Jerome Lane's his third CBA All-Star Game in a row and also Reggie Jordan's third. Former NBA champion Darryl Dawkins made his first appearance (scored 2 pts).

Two years later All-Stars Gerard King and Michael Hawkins played in the 1998 FIBA World Championship under Rudy Tomjanovich.

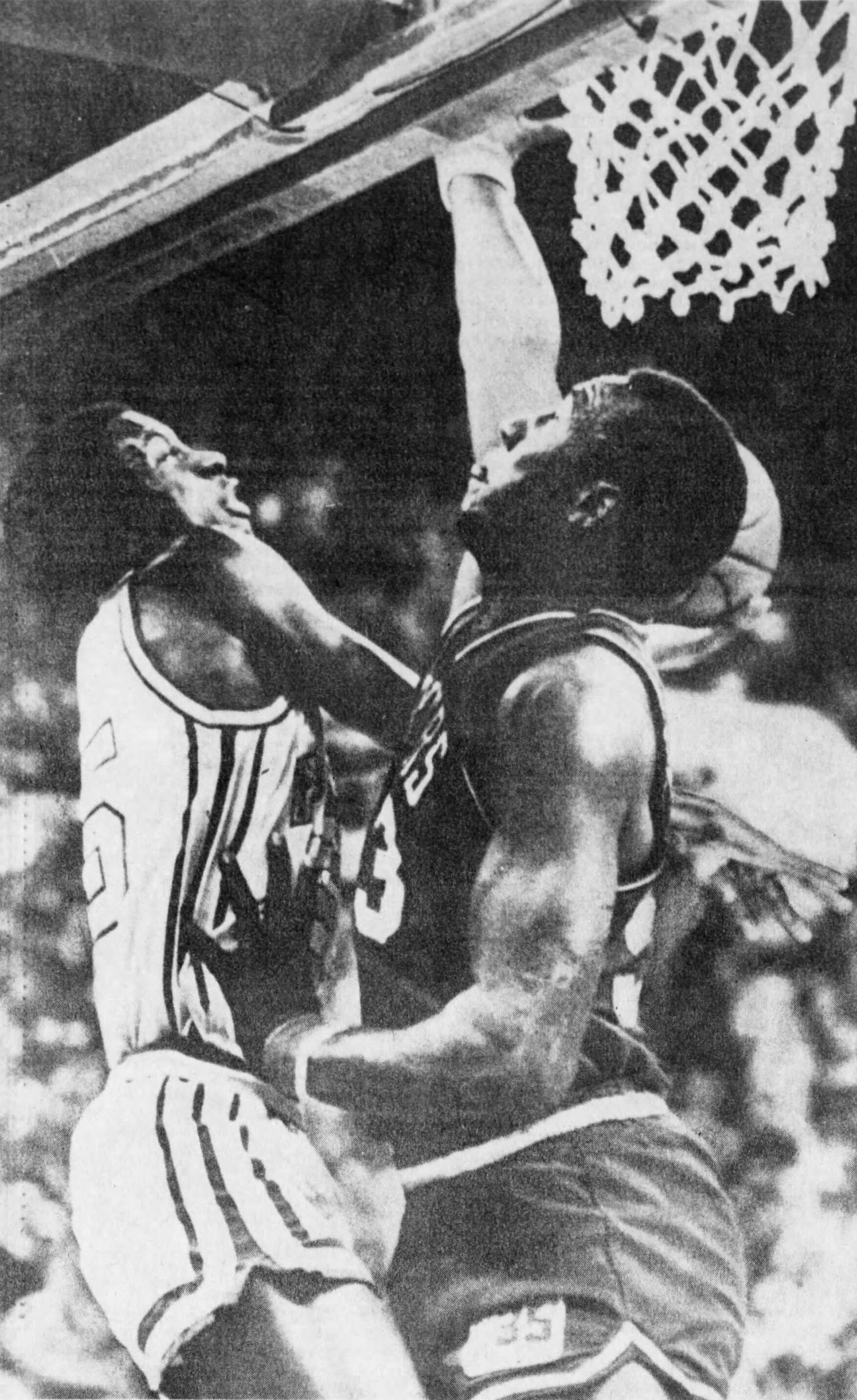
Darryl Dawkins played in the 1996 CBA All-Star Game (here, right with the 76ers in 1981)

== The 1996 CBA All-Star Game events ==
=== CBA Long Distance Shootout ===
Darryl Johnson of Omaha Racers was the winner.

=== Slum-dunk ===
Shelton Jones of Florida Beach Dogs was the winner.

=== The Game ===
Henry James was the top scorer of the match with 24 points for the National Conference, while teammate Tracy Moore had 20 pts and Reggie Jordan 15. Sam Mack of the American All-Stars scored 22.

Jerome Lane was the top rebounder with 16.

== All-Star teams ==
=== Rosters ===
National Conference
| Pos. | Player | Team | Previous appearances |
Team
| F | (United States) Shelton Jones | Florida Beach Dogs | 1993 |
| F | (United States) Tracey Ware | Shreveport-Bossier Mavericks | |
| F | (United States) Leonard White* | San Diego Wildcards | |
| G | (United States) Anthony Goldwire | Yakima Sun Kings | |
| G | (United States) Reggie Jordan | Sioux Falls Skyforce | 1993, 1994 |
| G | (United States) Voshon Lenard* | Oklahoma City Cavalry | |
| C | (United States) Jerome Lane | Oklahoma City Cavalry | 1994, 1995 |
| F | (United States) Henry James | Sioux Falls Skyforce | 1993, 1995 |
| F | (United States) Tracy Moore | Shreveport-Bossier Mavericks | 1992 |
| C | (United States) Darryl Dawkins | Sioux Falls Skyforce | |
| G | (United States) Stanley Jackson | Florida Beach Dogs | |
| G | (United States) Kermit Holmes | Oklahoma City Cavalry | |
Head coach: (United States) Russ Bergman (Oklahoma City Cavalry)

American Conference
| Pos. | Player | Team | Previous appearances |
Team
| G | (United States) Carl Thomas | Grand Rapids Mackers | |
| G | (United States) Rumeal Robinson | Connecticut Pride | |
| G | (United States) Gerald Madkins | Rockford Lightning | |
| G | (United States) Jay Edwards | Fort Wayne Fury | |
| G | (United States) Sam Mack | Rockford Lightning | |
| F | (United States) Gerard King | Quad City Thunder | |
| F | (United States) Ray Jackson | Grand Rapids Mackers | |
| F | (United States) Alex Blackwell | Connecticut Pride | |
| C | (United States) Ivano Newbill | Grand Rapids Mackers | |
| C | (United States) Chad Gallagher | Rockford Lightning | 1994 |
| G | (United States) LaBradford Smith | Quad City Thunder | |
Head coach:

- Unavaiable Leonard White and Voshon Lenard were replaced by Kermit Holmes and Stanley Jackson.

=== Result ===
| Team 1 | Score | Team 2 |
|---|---|---|
| National Conference | 121–105 | American Conference |

== Awards ==
| MVP | Topscorer | Slam-dunk champion | Long Distance Shootout Winner |
|---|---|---|---|
| (United States) Shelton Jones | (United States) Henry James | (United States) Shelton Jones | (United States) Darryl Johnson |

== See also ==
- 1997 CBA All-Star Game
- Continental Basketball Association
