= Galen Young =

American basketball player (1975–2021)

Personal information
- Born: October 16, 1975 Memphis, Tennessee, U.S.
- Died: June 5, 2021 (aged 45) Memphis, Tennessee, U.S.
- Listed height: 6 ft 6 in (1.98 m)
- Listed weight: 220 lb (100 kg)

Career information
- High school: Hillcrest (Memphis, Tennessee)
- College: NW Mississippi CC (1994–1996); Charlotte (1997–1999)
- NBA draft: 1999: 2nd round, 48th overall pick
- Drafted by: Milwaukee Bucks
- Playing career: 1999–2012
- Position: Small forward / power forward
- Coaching career: 2010–2011, 2016–2021

Career history

Playing
- 1999–2000: Grand Rapids Hoops
- 2000–2001: Bosch Blue Winds
- 2001–2002: North Charleston Lowgators
- 2002: Toros de Aragua
- 2002–2004: Gary Steelheads
- 2004: Alaska Aces
- 2004–2005: Viola Reggio Calabria
- 2005–2006: Unelco Tenerife
- 2006: Pepsi Caserta
- 2006–2007: Yakima Sun Kings
- 2007: San Miguel Beermen
- 2007–2008: Townsville Crocodiles
- 2008–2009: East Kentucky Miners
- 2009: Alaska Aces
- 2009–2010: Perth Wildcats
- 2010: BC Titans
- 2010–2011: East Kentucky Energy
- 2011–2012: Hawke's Bay Hawks
- 2011–2012: Bluff City Reign

Coaching
- 2010–2011: East Kentucky Energy
- 2016–2020: Lane (assistant)
- 2020–2021: Rockhurst (assistant)

Career highlights
- NBL champion (2010); CBA champion (2007); CBA Most Valuable Player (2007); 2× CBA All-Star (2004, 2007); All-CBA First Team (2007); All-CBA Third Team (2003); CBA All-Rookie Team (2000); CBA rebounding leader (2009); CBA assists leader (2007); First-team All-Conference USA (1999)
- Stats at Basketball Reference

Leslie Galen Young (October 16, 1975 – June 5, 2021) was an American professional basketball player. He played two years of Division I college basketball for the Charlotte 49ers, where he earned first-team All-Conference USA honors in 1999. He played professionally in the United States and abroad for 13 years, winning a Continental Basketball Association championship in 2007 with the Yakima Sun Kings and an Australian National Basketball League championship in 2010 with the Perth Wildcats.

== College career ==
After attending Hillcrest High School in Memphis, Tennessee, Young spent two years at Northwest Mississippi Community College between 1994 and 1996. As a sophomore, he was named the team's Most Valuable Player and a two-time selection for All-State. He was a NJCAA All-American and named to the All-Tournament Team.

He transferred to the University of North Carolina at Charlotte and began playing for the 49ers in 1997. In 1999, he was named first-team All-Conference USA, Conference USA tournament MVP, and Conference USA All-Tournament Team. He averaged 14.7 points and 7.2 rebounds per game as a senior and left UNC-Charlotte third in scoring, second in blocked shots and fourth in rebounding in program history.

== Professional career ==
Young was selected by the Milwaukee Bucks with the 48th overall pick in the 1999 NBA draft. After spending preseason with the Bucks, he played his first professional season in the Continental Basketball Association (CBA) with the Grand Rapids Hoops and averaged 11.6 points and 5.1 rebounds per game. He was selected to the CBA All-Rookie Team.

For the 2000–01 season, Young moved to Japan to play for the Bosch Blue Winds.

After a preseason stint with the Indiana Pacers, Young spent the 2001–02 season in the NBA Development League with the North Charleston Lowgators. He later had a short stint in Venezuela with Toros de Aragua.

For the 2002–03 season, Young returned to the CBA and averaged 15.3 points and 8.3 rebounds with the Gary Steelheads.

After a preseason stint with the Seattle SuperSonics, Young played a second season with the Steelheads in 2003–04. He averaged 15.5 points and 8.0 rebounds. He later had a stint in the Philippines with the Alaska Aces in the PBA Fiesta Conference.

After another preseason stint with the SuperSonics, Young played the 2004–05 season in Italy with Viola Reggio Calabria.

Young split the 2005–06 season in Spain with Unelco Tenerife and in Italy with Pepsi Caserta.

The 2006–07 season saw Young help the Yakima Sun Kings win the CBA championship, while earning CBA Most Valuable Player and All-CBA First Team honors. Following the CBA season, he had a stint in the Philippines with San Miguel Beermen. He lifted the team from a 1–6 start to sixth place at the end of the elimination round. San Miguel went on to finish fourth after losing to eventual champion Alaska in the semifinals.

For the 2007–08 season, Young moved to Australia to play for the Townsville Crocodiles in the NBL. He averaged 11.3 points and 9.4 rebounds.

Young had his fifth season in the CBA in 2008–09, playing for the East Kentucky Miners. He then had a short stint in the Philippines with the Alaska Aces.

In December 2009, Young returned to Australia, signing with the Perth Wildcats for the rest of the 2009–10 NBL season as an injury replacement for Paul Rogers. He averaged 6.0 points and 4.5 rebounds in 16 games and helped the Wildcats win the NBL championship.

In 2010, Young had an 11-game stint with the BC Titans of the International Basketball League.

For the 2010–11 season, Young served as player-coach of the East Kentucky Energy in the ABA. He led them to an ABA Final Four and was named one of the ABA's East All-Star Team Coaches for the 2011 ABA All-Star game.

In April 2011, Young moved to New Zealand to play for the Hawke's Bay Hawks in the NBL. He helped the Hawks reach the final of the 2011 season, where they lost to the Wellington Saints.

Young had a short stint in the ABA during the 2011–12 season with the Bluff City Reign. He then returned to New Zealand to play a second season with the Hawks in 2012. In his final professional playing season, Young averaged 11.5 points, 7.1 rebounds and 3.7 assists in 17 games.

== Coaching career ==
In 2016, Young became an assistant coach for the Lane College men's basketball team. He spent four seasons with the Dragons as an assistant. He then spent the 2020–21 season as an assistant coach with the Rockhurst University men's basketball program.

== Personal life ==
Young was the father of two twin sons, Grayson and Ellis.

== Death ==
Around 2:30 a.m. on June 5, 2021, Young was in his mother's Memphis house when a car crashed into a room where he was using a computer. The portion of the house that the car hit collapsed on impact and Young was buried under a mountain of rubble. His body was found buried in the debris over four hours later while his family were clearing the house. Young's family were unaware that he was staying in the house and had not told the police to look for him. At the time of his death, Young had been preparing for a high school basketball coaching job in Jackson, Mississippi, and was supposed to start the next day.

The car's 19-year-old driver, Miracle Rutherford, was charged with vehicular homicide, driving without insurance and reckless driving. As part of a plea deal in 2023, Rutherford pleaded guilty to reckless vehicular homicide and was placed in a judicial diversion program instead of imprisonment.
