= Texas Rim Rockers =

Former USA basketball club

- League: USBL
- Founded: 2002, 2010
- Dissolved: 2003, 2011
- History: Texas Rim Rockers 2003; Texas RimRockers 2010-11
- Arena: Fort Worth Convention Center
- Capacity: 13,000
- Location: Fort Worth, Texas
- Team colors: black, orange, white
- President: Mark McClure (CEO)
- Ownership: Mark McClure

The Texas Rim Rockers, was a professional basketball club in the United States Basketball League (USBL) during the 2003 season. It was located in Fort Worth, Texas.

== History ==
The team was founded by Portland Wave's former owner, Mark McClure, in October 2002. Their venue was the Fort Worth Convention Center. The club's first ever coach was former NBA player Robert Reid with Talvin Hester as his assistant. As a new entrant in the USBL, the Rockers were awarded No. 1 Pick in the 2003 USBL Draft, Merriex Chosen. Drew Nicholas, who later enjoyed a successful career in Europe, was also selected in the 2003 USBL Draft by the Texas Rim Rockers (59th overall).

The Rim Rockers played in the 2003 USBL season, which ended with a 2-28 record. It was the league's worst record, behind the Kansas Cagerz. As a result the Rim Rockers did not qualify for the play-offs. The Texas Rim Rockers were in financial disarray and McClure, who resigned as the team's CEO on May 9, 2003 while GM Don Wesley has stepped in as majority owner. The club moved from the impressive Fort Worth Convention Center to the Sid Richardson Center at Texas Wesleyan University. Eventually, the club disbanded after the 2003 season.

Notable players like Schea Cotton, Maurice Jeffers, Jemeil Rich, Leon Smith and Maurice Carter, played for the franchise.

A club called Arkansas RimRockers, located in North Little Rock, Arkansas, was founded the following year and it joined the ABA. In 2010 the Texas Rim Rockers was re-founded as Texas RimRockers joining the ABA and was active until 2011 featuring in the 2010–11 ABA season. They finished bottom of the table in their division.

== Seasons ==
Stagione	League	Name	W	L	%	Place	Play-off	Coach
2003	USBL	Texas Rim Rockers	2	28	6,7	4º	-	Robert Reid; Richard Williams; Donald Wesley
2010-11	ABA	Texas RimRockers				10º	-	

== Home arenas ==
- Fort Worth Convention Center 2003
- Sid Richardson Center at Texas Wesleyan University 2003

== Roster ==
=== 2003 season ===
- Bingo Merriex, Chad Wilkerson, Dameon Sanson, Jai Pradia, Desmond Wesley, Greg Clausen, (Panama) Dioniso Gomez, David Sykes, Maurice Carter, Toshay Harvey, Rod Gregorie, Jemeil Rich, Maurice Bullock, Nolan Johnson, Chris Scott, Donald Harris, Dewuane Wesley, Kipp Christianson, Robert Reid, Schea Cotton, Maurice Jeffers, Leon Smith.

== See also ==
- Texas Tycoons
