= Schea Cotton =

American basketball player (born 1978)

Personal information
- Born: May 20, 1978 (age 48) Inglewood, California, U.S.
- Listed height: 6 ft 6 in (1.98 m)
- Listed weight: 215 lb (98 kg)

Career information
- High school: St. John Bosco (Bellflower, California); Mater Dei (Santa Ana, California); St. Thomas More (Oakdale, Connecticut)
- College: Long Beach CC (1998–1999); Alabama (1999–2000)
- NBA draft: 2000: undrafted
- Playing career: 2000–2010
- Position: Shooting guard

Career history
- 2001: Partizan
- 2001: Shanghai Sharks
- 2002: Étendard de Brest
- 2002: Évreux
- 2003: Leneros de Los Mina
- 2003: Texas Rim Rockers
- 2003–2004: Long Beach Jam
- 2004: Cocodrilos de Caracas
- 2004: Cedar Rapids River Raiders
- 2004–2005: Harlem Globetrotters
- 2005: Pennsylvania Valley Dawgs
- 2008: Deportivo Tachira
- 2008: Lobos Grises de la UAD
- 2010: Guaros de Lara

Career highlights
- Second-team All-SEC (2000); Junior college All-American (1999); First-team Parade All-American (1996); Fourth-team Parade All-American (1995)

Vernon Scheavalie "Schea" Cotton (born May 20, 1978) is an American former professional basketball player. He was highly touted as a high school player, when he seemed destined to play professionally in the National Basketball Association (NBA). He played 10 years professionally, but never reached the NBA.

Growing up in the Los Angeles area, Cotton was physically mature beyond his years. He gained national exposure before even playing in high school. The interest level in his prep career was arguably as high as any player ever. Due to disputes over his entrance examination scores with the National Collegiate Athletic Association (NCAA), his college basketball career was delayed for two years. After a lawsuit with the NCAA was settled, Cotton played one season with the Alabama Crimson Tide. He decided to forgo his final two years of college eligibility to enter the 2000 NBA draft, but he went undrafted. Cotton played professionally for 10 years, both domestically as well as in numerous foreign countries. After retiring as a player, he became a basketball coach and trainer for young players.

== Early life ==
Vernon Scheavalie Cotton was born in Los Angeles County at Inglewood, California, to Gaynell and James Cotton. He was named by his father after singer Maurice Chevalier. As kids could not pronounce his name, Cotton came to be known as Schea. After his family moved from San Pedro, California in 1990 due to concerns with gangs, he enrolled at St. Irenaeus Catholic School in Cypress. The school did not have any openings in the seventh grade, so Cotton repeated the sixth grade. His mother denied that he was held back to gain a physical advantage to earn an athletic scholarship. At age 12 and in the sixth grade, he stood 6 feet (1.8 m) and 180 pounds (82 kg) and was captain on a team which included seventh- and eighth-graders. That year, Cotton was featured in the Los Angeles Times. He was able to dunk on alley-oops as a seventh-grader, which was uncommon at the time. Cotton became nationally known before even reaching high school. According to ESPN in 2010, the expectations for him were "as great as any pre-high school aged player ever, even LeBron James."

By the time he was a high school freshman, Cotton had grown to 6 feet 4 inches (1.93 m) and 220 pounds (100 kg). He started the year at St. John Bosco High School in Bellflower, where he played four games. Citing a desire to play with teammates from his summer team, he transferred mid-season to Mater Dei High School in Santa Ana, where many of them attended. That year, Cotton averaged 20 points and seven rebounds per game, and Mater Dei won the 1994 Southern Section Division I-A championship and advanced to the Southern California regional final. He was profiled in Sports Illustrated, who billed him as one of the nation's top high school players. "Don't laugh. This kid could pull it off," wrote the magazine of Cotton's desire to jump directly from high school to the NBA. His games had developed a following, drawing well above-average crowds. In an era before the Internet, high school games were not televised, and his fame spread through word of mouth. Still, the interest level in Cotton at the time has been compared to the fanfare of LeBron James' prep career, and some have referred to him as "LeBron before LeBron." Youngsters would wait for over a half-hour for his autograph. In 2014, Cal-Hi Sports hailed him as "arguably the most ballyhooed youth player in [California] history."

In his sophomore year, Cotton averaged 24 points and 10 rebounds, leading Mater Dei to a 36–1 record and a state championship, their third in 13 seasons. He was voted All-Southern Section Division I Player of the Year, and was named to the All-Southern Section Division I Team for the second straight year. Cotton also became the first and only sophomore to be named Cal-Hi Sports Division I State Player of the Year, and was honored nationally as a fourth-team Parade All-American. He wore 37 pairs of shoes that year, a new pair for each game courtesy of Nike. According to Cotton, "I basically had a shoe contract in high school, to be honest, without the money."

After two years at one of the country's top programs in Mater Dei, Cotton returned to St. John Bosco. The school received little press coverage, and he had grown weary of the attention he garnered at Mater Dei. In his junior year, Cotton broke a bone in his left hand and missed most of the season. Though he played in only 11 games, he was named a first-team Parade All-American. He missed his senior year after undergoing surgery to repair damaged ligaments in his left shoulder. He had suffered the injury over the summer in an Amateur Athletic Union (AAU) game against Lamar Odom. Despite being sidelined, one recruiting service tabbed him as the No. 2 high school prospect in the nation.

== College career ==
A report from a Las Vegas newspaper during Cotton's junior year speculated that he was considering entering the NBA draft after his senior year. Still, he committed in 1996 to play for Long Beach State. However, his brother, James, announced in 1997 that he would be leaving the school early and declaring for the NBA draft, prompting Cotton to request and receive a release from his letter of intent. Afterwards, some college coaches believed Cotton would jump directly to the NBA. Although Kevin Garnett triggered a second generation of NBA high school draftees in 1995, followed by Kobe Bryant and Jermaine O'Neal a year later, college remained the predominant choice at the time for top prep players.

In April 1997, he committed to play at UCLA, where he was expected to team with fellow incoming freshman Baron Davis, another top recruit from Los Angeles, who signed days later. Cotton's admission was contingent on earning a qualifying score on the SAT, which he had not received in two attempts. On his third try, he scored 900, which surpassed the NCAA minimum of 700 for incoming freshman, but the NCAA invalidated his score. Cotton had been diagnosed with a learning disability, auditory learning, in which he comprehended better by listening than by seeing. The Educational Testing Service (ETS), which publishes and oversees the SAT, confirmed the diagnosis, and allowed him to take the test with extra time and larger font text. The NCAA, however, had stricter criteria than the ETS, and disagreed that he was entitled to take the non-standard test. Cotton denied any wrongdoing, and felt he was being targeted by the NCAA. Earlier, the NCAA had investigated a Ford sport-utility vehicle driven by Cotton, which they suspected was provided to him as an incentive to sign with UCLA. However, the NCAA absolved him of violating his amateur status based on documents provided by his parents.

Blocked from attending UCLA, Cotton enrolled at St. Thomas More, a prep school in Connecticut where players had gone to enhance their academic profile and play in a competitive environment. After one year, he signed with North Carolina State, but the NCAA again contested his SATs and prevented his enrollment. Instead, Cotton returned home to attend junior college at Long Beach City College, where his games attracted NBA scouts. He averaged 25.8 points and 5.8 rebounds and was named a junior college All-American, leading Long Beach to a 33–3 record. In parallel, his family sued the NCAA in September 1998; the case was settled four months later. The Cottons said they spent $60,000 battling the NCAA. After being declared eligible by the NCAA, Cotton earned a scholarship to play college ball at the University of Alabama.

As a sophomore with the Crimson Tide in 1999–2000, the 21-year-old Cotton was the team's most veteran player. With four freshman starters, Alabama was among the youngest teams in Division I. Although the team struggled, Cotton averaged a team-leading 15.5 points and 4.6 rebounds per game, and he earned second-team all-conference honors in the Southeastern Conference (SEC). Playing out of position as an undersized power forward, he did not help to address critics of his perimeter skills. Forgoing his remaining two years of college eligibility, he hired an agent and declared early for the NBA. In 2010, he expressed disappointment in his college experience. "If I had known what I know now, I would probably have skipped college," said Cotton.

== Professional career ==
Many expected Cotton to be selected in the second round of the 2000 NBA draft, but he went undrafted. He called the experience an "embarrassing moment, and it was devastating." The Orlando Magic invited him to play in the Orlando Summer League, but the team's summer season ended after just one day when Magic player Conrad McRae collapsed and died during practice. Later that summer, Cotton was drafted fourth overall by the Anaheim Roadrunners of the American Basketball Association (ABA), but the team was unable to secure the Honda Center (known then as Arrowhead Pond) as its home arena, and he never played for them. He was also drafted by the Sioux Falls Skyforce of the Continental Basketball Association (CBA), but he was their last cut in training camp after not having shot well.

Cotton remained confident that he could play in the NBA, buoyed by the knowledge that past opponents that he had either outplayed or held his own against had eventually made it in the league. Ultimately, he never played in the NBA. In 2002, the NBA Development League allocated him to the Huntsville Flight. On the first day of practice, he pulled his thigh muscle, and was still unable to play the next day. He was eventually cut. Cotton played for the Los Angeles Clippers in the Summer Pro League in 2003. In November 2007, he was selected by the Tulsa 66ers in the ninth round of the 2007 NBA Development League Draft, but he was waived a couple of weeks later.

Nonetheless, Cotton played professionally for 10 years, and picked up several languages over a career that saw him play in seven countries and numerous U.S. leagues. He landed with KK Partizan in Belgrade, FR Yugoslavia, where he played 20 games for Vlade Divac's former team in 2001. He then joined the Shanghai Sharks, Yao Ming's former team in China. After playing abroad for two years, Cotton returned to Long Beach in 2003 to play for the ABA's Long Beach Jam—he was the first player signed by the new franchise. Domestically, he also played in the United States Basketball League and toured with the Harlem Globetrotters. His career also took him overseas to France, the Dominican Republic, Venezuela, and Mexico.

After retiring from playing, Cotton became a basketball trainer with his own academy, as well as a coach in the Los Angeles area for Millikan High School and Belmont Shore in AAU. In 2016, he premiered his documentary, Manchild: The Schea Cotton Story, which covers his rise as a high school sensation and the letdown of not reaching the NBA.

== Player profile ==
Entering high school, Cotton's physical maturity provided him the size, speed, and power to dominate his opponents. "He is a kid in a man's body," said Toby Bailey, who faced a freshman Cotton in the Southern Section Division I-A semifinals in 1994. As a sophomore, Cotton was described by the Chicago Tribune as "already a complete player with upper-body strength of a college senior." However, he did not undergo a second growth spurt. As he grew older, his strength and size were no longer an advantage like they were in high school. Cotton became too short to be a forward, but was not quick enough to defend guards. His jump shot and ball-handling ability were suspect by NBA standards. "I never thought he could play," said NBA scout Marty Blake.
