= Maurice Jeffers =

American basketball player (born 1979)

Personal information
- Born: April 3, 1979 (age 47) Morrilton, Arkansas, U.S.
- Listed height: 6 ft 5 in (1.96 m)
- Listed weight: 215 lb (98 kg)

Career information
- High school: Morrilton (Morrilton, Arkansas)
- College: Arkansas – Fort Smith (1997–1999); Saint Louis (1999–2001)
- NBA draft: 2001: 2nd round, 55th overall pick
- Drafted by: Sacramento Kings
- Playing career: 2001–2012
- Position: Small forward / shooting guard

Career history
- 2001: Asheville Altitude
- 2002: Fribourg Olympic
- 2003: Texas RimRockers
- 2003: Kansas Cagerz
- 2003–2004: Cornellà
- 2004: Kansas Cagerz
- 2004–2005: Baloncesto León
- 2005–2006: L'Hospitalet
- 2006: Kansas Cagerz
- 2006–2007: Lleida Bàsquet
- 2007–2008: Breogán
- 2008–2010: Gießen 46ers
- 2010–2011: Club Atlético Lanús
- 2011–2012: Gießen 46ers
- Stats at Basketball Reference

Maurice Cardale Jeffers (born April 3, 1979) is an American former professional basketball player. He is 6'5" in height and weighs 210 pounds. His position is shooting guard and small forward. He was selected in the 2nd Round (55th) pick in the 2001 NBA draft by the Sacramento Kings, but he has never signed a contract with an NBA team, making him 1 of 8 players from the 2001 NBA Draft to never play a game in the league.

== High school and college career ==
Jeffers, one of the best players to come from Morrilton High School. Attended Westark Junior College located in Ft. Smith, Arkansas. His second season (1998–1999) he averaged 20 points, 9.5 rebounds, 2 assists and 1.1 steals per game. He moved on to college ball at Saint Louis University. In his senior season (2000–2001) he averaged 16.0 points, 6.1 rebounds, 2.5 assists and 1 steal per game. His season high was 27 points in a (71–61) win over Louisville Cardinals on January 6, 2001.
