= Drew Nicholas =

American basketball player (born 1981)

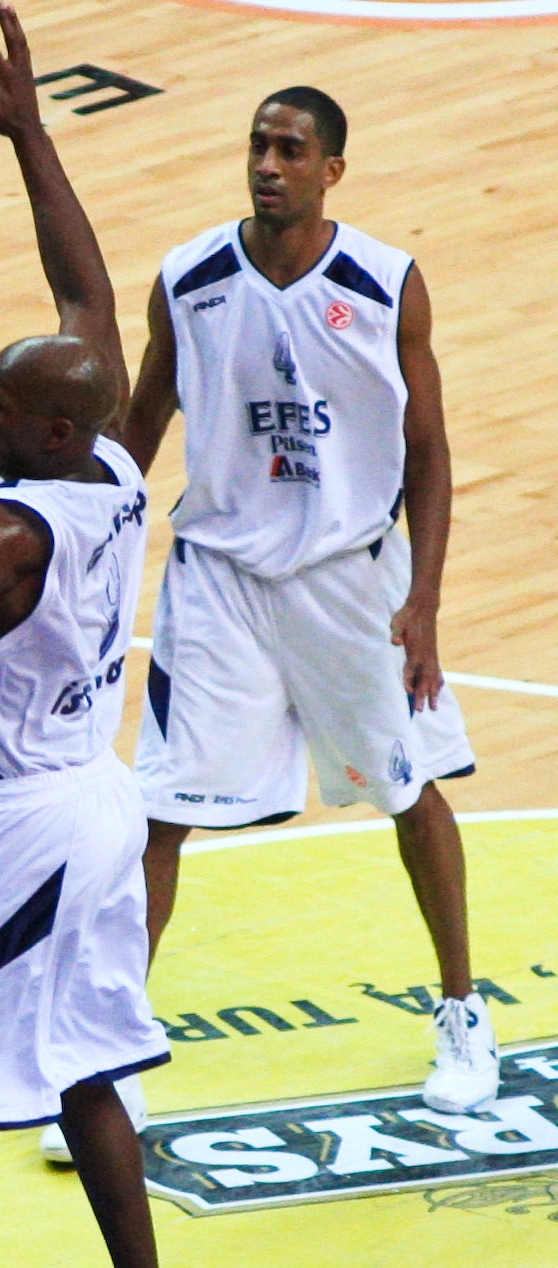
- Nicholas with Efes Pilsen

Boston Celtics
- Title: Executive Director of Player Personnel
- League: NBA

Personal information
- Born: May 17, 1981 (age 45) Hempstead, New York, U.S.
- Listed height: 6 ft 4 in (1.93 m)
- Listed weight: 180 lb (82 kg)

Career information
- High school: Long Island Lutheran (Brookville, New York)
- College: Maryland (1999–2003)
- NBA draft: 2003: undrafted
- Playing career: 2003–2012
- Position: Shooting guard
- Number: 4, 11, 12, 21

Career history
- 2003–2004: Fabriano Basket
- 2004–2005: Basket Livorno
- 2005: TAU Ceramica
- 2005–2006: Benetton Treviso
- 2006–2008: Efes Pilsen
- 2008–2011: Panathinaikos
- 2011–2012: Emporio Armani Milano
- 2012: CSKA Moscow

Career highlights
- 2× EuroLeague champion (2009, 2011); Alphonso Ford EuroLeague Top Scorer Trophy (2006); Lega Serie A champion (2006); Lega Serie A Top Scorer (2005); Italian 2nd Division Top Scorer (2004); 3× Greek League champion (2009–2011); Greek Cup winner (2009); Greek League Finals MVP (2009); All-Greek League Team (2010); 3× Greek All Star (2009–2011); 2× Greek All-Star Game 3-Point Shootout Champion (2010, 2011); Turkish Cup winner (2007); NCAA champion (2002); Second-team All-ACC (2003)

Andrew Lawrence Nicholas (born May 17, 1981) is an American former professional basketball player. A 6 ft 4 in (1.93 m) shooting guard, Nicholas was the leading scorer in the EuroLeague 2005–06 season, being awarded the Alphonso Ford Trophy. He is a two-time EuroLeague champion, winning in 2009 and 2011 with Panathinaikos.

== High school ==
Born in Hempstead, New York, Nicholas played high school basketball at Long Island Lutheran, in New York, from 1995 to 1999.

== College career ==
Nicholas played college basketball at the University of Maryland, College Park with the Maryland Terrapins from 1999 to 2003. In 2002, Nicholas helped Maryland win its first national championship. He made the All-Atlantic Coast Conference 2nd Team in his senior season in college. His most memorable moment came in the 2003 NCAA Tournament when he hit a three-pointer at the buzzer to win a first-round game against UNC-Wilmington. He also hit a three-pointer at the buzzer to give coach Gary Williams his 500th career coaching victory against NC State.

== Professional career ==
Nicholas was selected in the 2003 USBL Draft by the Texas Rim Rockers (59th overall). He then moved to Italy for the 2003–04 season, signed by Fabriano Basket, in the Italian LegADue (Italy's 2nd-tier level league). He led Legadue in scoring with 27.1 points per game that season. He was signed for the 2004–05 season by Basket Livorno. He led Italy's top-tier level LBA in scoring with 22.8 points per game. At the end of the Italian League's regular season, he moved to Spain, signed for the remainder of the season by TAU Ceramica. He then went back to Italy for the 2005–06 season, signed by Benetton Treviso. He led the EuroLeague in scoring with 18.4 points per game. He moved to Turkey for the 2006–07 season, signed by Efes Pilsen. In March 2008, he briefly negotiated with the Israeli Super League club Maccabi Tel Aviv, on a three-year contract offer, but he was unable to reach a final contractual agreement with the club.

On June 24, 2008, he signed a two-year contract with Greek club Panathinaikos. Nicholas helped Panathinaikos win the 2009 and 2011 EuroLeague championships. He also won the Greek Cup in 2009, as well as the Greek League championship in 2009, 2010, and 2011. In July 2011, he signed with Italian club Armani Jeans Milano. In January 2012, Nicholas was waived by Armani Jeans Milano.

In July 2012, after being a free agent for 7 months since his departure from AJ Milano, Nicholas signed a one-year contract with the Russian club CSKA Moscow. However, on November 23, 2012, Nicholas reached an agreement to terminate his contract with the team, by mutual agreement. In July 2013, he officially announced his retirement from playing professional basketball, after having played his last game in 2012.

== Post-playing career ==
After he retired from playing professional basketball, Nicholas became a basketball analyst and sports commentator. In 2016 he joined the Minnesota Timberwolves as a scout. He then moved on to similar roles with the Philadelphia 76ers and the Boston Celtics.

On August 15, 2022, the Denver Nuggets hired Nicholas to serve as the team's director of scouting.

On July 21, 2025, the Celtics hired Nicholas to serve as their executive director of player personnel.

== Personal life ==
In February 2008, Nicholas refused to travel with Efes Pilsen for their away game against Partizan in Belgrade, due to a recommendation for U.S. citizens not to visit Serbia, which was related to the tension that was caused after the declaration of the independence of Kosovo. He was then banned from the club, and shortly after that he was released. He has an extensive front office resume and has worked with the Denver Nuggets in Denver, CO, where he resided with his wife and three children. He currently works as Executive Director of Player Personnel for the Boston Celtics.

== Career statistics ==
Legend
GP	Games played	GS	Games started	MPG	Minutes per game
FG%	Field-goal percentage	3P%	3-point field-goal percentage	FT%	Free-throw percentage
RPG	Rebounds per game	APG	Assists per game	SPG	Steals per game
BPG	Blocks per game	PPG	Points per game	PIR	Performance index rating
**Bold**	Career high

=== EuroLeague ===
†	Denotes season in which Nicholas won the EuroLeague
*	Led the league

Year	Team	GP	GS	MPG	FG%	3P%	FT%	RPG	APG	SPG	BPG	PPG	PIR
2005–06	Treviso	20	17	33.8	**.479**	**.457**	**.827**	2.8	2.7	1.1	.1	**18.4***	**16.6**
2006–07	Efes	20	**20**	**34.3**	.429	.400	.726	2.5	2.5	**3.8**	**.2**	13.9	13.1
2007–08	Efes	14	12	32.5	.430	.353	.729	**3.0**	**2.9**	1.0	.1	16.5	14.1
2008–09†	Panathinaikos	**22**	16	23.5	.429	.408	.615	1.3	1.2	1.0	.1	8.3	6.0
2009–10	Panathinaikos	16	15	27.6	.433	.410	.667	1.2	2.2	.9	**.2**	10.5	7.9
2010–11†	Panathinaikos	20	6	23.0	.437	.415	.600	1.1	1.7	.4	.1	9.8	6.1
2011–12	Milano	14	8	26.4	.302	.297	.625	2.6	1.7	.5	**.2**	7.4	4.2
2012–13	CSKA Moscow	4	1	15.0	.067	.000	—	.5	.8	—	—	.5	-3.5
Career		130	95	28.2	.422	.391	.737	2.0	2.3	.8	.1	11.8	9.4
