= Maurice Carter (basketball) =

American basketball player (born 1976)

Personal information
- Born: October 12, 1976 (age 49) Jackson, Mississippi, U.S.
- Listed height: 6 ft 5 in (1.96 m)
- Listed weight: 210 lb (95 kg)

Career information
- High school: Forest Hill (Jackson, Mississippi)
- College: LSU (1995–1999)
- NBA draft: 1999: undrafted
- Playing career: 1999–2006
- Position: Shooting guard
- Number: 1, 5

Career history
- 1999–2000: San Diego Stingrays
- 2000: Rochester Skeeters
- 2000–2001: St. Louis Swarm
- 2001: Peristeri
- 2001–2002: Kansas City Knights
- 2002: Yakima Sun Kings
- 2003: Texas RimRockers
- 2003: Leones de Ponce
- 2004: Gary Steelheads
- 2003–2004: Dakota Wizards
- 2004: Los Angeles Lakers
- 2004: Dakota Wizards
- 2004: New Orleans Hornets
- 2004–2005: Lottomatica Roma
- 2005: Girona
- 2005: Mississippi Hardhats
- 2006: Girona

Career highlights
- CBA champion (2004); CBA Finals MVP (2004); All-CBA Second Team (2004); ABA All Star-Game MVP (2002)
- Stats at NBA.com
- Stats at Basketball Reference

Maurice Carter (born October 12, 1976) is an American former professional basketball player.

A 6'5" guard from Louisiana State University, Carter played ten games for the Los Angeles Lakers and New Orleans Hornets during the 2003-04 NBA season. He later played in Spain.

Carter played for the Dakota Wizards of the Continental Basketball Association (CBA) during the 2003–04 season. He was named the Finals Most Valuable Player and selected to the All-CBA Second Team.
