= James Cotton (basketball) =

American basketball player

Personal information
- Born: December 14, 1975 (age 50) Los Angeles, California, U.S.
- Listed height: 6 ft 5 in (1.96 m)
- Listed weight: 220 lb (100 kg)

Career information
- High school: St. John Bosco (Bellflower, California)
- College: Long Beach State (1993–1997)
- NBA draft: 1997: 2nd round, 32nd overall pick
- Drafted by: Denver Nuggets
- Position: Shooting guard
- Number: 4

Career history
- 1997–1999: Seattle SuperSonics
- 2000–2001: West Sydney Razorbacks

Career highlights
- 2× First-team All-Big West (1996, 1997); Big West Freshman of the Year (1994)
- Stats at NBA.com
- Stats at Basketball Reference

James Wesley Cotton (born December 14, 1975) is an American former professional basketball player who played for the Seattle SuperSonics in the National Basketball Association (NBA). He played college basketball for the Long Beach State 49ers. He was selected by Seattle in the second round of the 1997 NBA draft.

Cotton was born in Los Angeles, California, and played basketball at Artesia High School in Lakewood before transferring to St. John Bosco High School in Bellflower. Cotton requested he be redshirted at the university.

Cotton, a 6-foot-5-inch (1.96 m) shooting guard, left Long Beach State early in 1997 and was selected with the fourth pick of the second round (32nd pick overall) in the NBA draft by the Denver Nuggets. His rights were then traded to the Seattle SuperSonics for the draft rights to Bobby Jackson.

He was used sparingly by the Sonics over two seasons until he and Hersey Hawkins were involved in a player trade to the Chicago Bulls in exchange for Brent Barry on August 12, 1999. Cotton was waived by the Bulls prior to the commencement of the 1999–2000 NBA season. He also played with the West Sydney Razorbacks in the Australian National Basketball League.

Cotton's younger brother, Schea, also became a pro basketball player.
