= Leon Smith (basketball) =

American basketball player (born 1980)

Personal information
- Born: November 2, 1980 (age 46) Chicago, Illinois, U.S.
- Listed height: 6 ft 10 in (2.08 m)
- Listed weight: 235 lb (107 kg)

Career information
- High school: Martin Luther King (Chicago, Illinois)
- NBA draft: 1999: 1st round, 29th overall pick
- Drafted by: San Antonio Spurs
- Playing career: 2000–2007
- Position: Center
- Number: 41, 35

Career history
- 2000–2001: St. Louis Swarm
- 2001–2002: Sioux Falls Skyforce
- 2002: Gary Steelheads
- 2002: Atlanta Hawks
- 2002–2003: Gary Steelheads
- 2003: Caguas Creoles
- 2003: Texas Rim Rockers
- 2003–2004: Gary Steelheads
- 2004: Great Lakes Storm
- 2004: Seattle SuperSonics
- 2007: Estudiantes de Bahía Blanca

Career highlights
- All-CBA Second Team (2002); CBA All-Defensive Team (2004); CBA rebounding leader (2004); CBA blocks leader (2004); Third-team Parade All-American (1999)
- Stats at NBA.com
- Stats at Basketball Reference

Leon Smith (born November 2, 1980) is an American former professional basketball player. He played in the National Basketball Association (NBA), the Continental Basketball Association, the USBL and the IBL, and abroad in Puerto Rico and Argentina.

Smith was raised in a foster home, called Lydia Children's Home, as a ward of the state of Illinois due to neglect from his parents when he was five years old.

Smith was selected out of Chicago's Martin Luther King High School (where he averaged 25.5 points and 14.5 rebounds per game in his senior year) by the San Antonio Spurs in the first round (29th overall) of the 1999 NBA draft, and was immediately traded to the Dallas Mavericks in exchange for the draft rights to Gordan Giriček and a second-round pick in the 2000 NBA draft. However, in subsequent months he suffered numerous psychological concerns, and was released in February 2000 without ever playing a game for the Mavericks. A month previous, Smith was released from a psychiatric ward to where he was committed for several weeks, after an incident in which he threw a rock through a car window and swallowed approximately 250 aspirin tablets and would tell police officers, "I am an Indian fighting Columbus".

Smith played for the Gary Steelheads and Sioux Falls Skyforce of the Continental Basketball Association (CBA) during the 2001–02 season and earned CBA All-League Second Team honors. In January 2002, Smith was signed by the Atlanta Hawks for whom he played 14 games. His short stint with the Hawks involved being waived, signed back a second time, and eventually being traded to the Milwaukee Bucks, for whom he never played.

Smith played for the Great Lakes Storm of the CBA during the 2003–04 season and was selected to the CBA All-Defensive Team. Late in the 2003–04 NBA season, the Seattle SuperSonics signed Smith to a contract, but he only played one game for them.
