= Gary Steelheads =

Professional basketball team

- League: CBA 2000; IBL 2000–2001; CBA 2001–2006; USBL 2007; IBL 2008
- Founded: 2000
- History: Gary Steelheads; 2000–2008
- Arena: Genesis Convention Center; 2000–2008
- Capacity: 6,500
- Location: Gary, Indiana
- Team colors: Navy blue, light blue, gray
- Head coach: Rob Spon
- Ownership: Showtime Sports and Entertainment, LLC
- Championships: 0

The Gary Steelheads were a professional basketball team. They played in the International Basketball League (IBL), Continental Basketball Association (CBA), and the United States Basketball League (USBL). They were based in Gary, Indiana, United States, and played their home games at the Genesis Convention Center. The Steelheads were the 2006 CBA Eastern Conference champions.

== History ==
Former logo, while in the CBA

Gary was awarded a franchise in the CBA in 2000. The league folded so the Steelheads joined the IBL. Former CBA franchise owners purchased the CBA name from the bankruptcy court. The IBL and IBA combined to reform the CBA in 2001. After playing five seasons in the CBA the team announced on July 21, 2006, that they would be sitting out the 2006–07 CBA season.

During that time former owner Jewell Harris Sr. was indicted on federal extortion and other charges unrelated to the team. He resigned from the team pending a sale.

On October 24, the new ownership, Showtime Sports and Entertainment, LLC (headlined by Jewell Harris Jr.), announced they would be moving to the USBL for 2007.

After one season in the USBL, which included multiple teams folding, the Steelheads joined the IBL (unrelated to the former IBL) for the 2008 season. The Steelheads sat out the 2009 season and eventually ceased operations.

== Season-by-season record ==
Year	League	GP	W	L	Pct.	Reg. season	Playoffs
2000	CBA	24	9	15	.375	5th, American	League folded
2000/01	IBL	30	7	23	.233	5th, National	Did not qualify
2001/02	CBA	56	22	34	.393	4th, American	Did not qualify
2002/03	CBA	48	25	23	.521	3rd, American	Did not qualify
2003/04	CBA	48	27	21	.563	3rd	Lost first round
2004/05	CBA	48	17	31	.354	4th, Eastern	Did not qualify
2005/06	CBA	48	29	19	.604	2nd, Eastern	Conference champs
2007	USBL	27	16	11	.593	3rd	Lost first round
2008	IBL	22	18	4	.818	1st	Opted out
totals	CBA	272	129	143	.474	–	

== Roster ==
Gary Steelheads all-time roster
Players			Coaches
(United States) Chris Alexander; (United States) Chris Allen; (United States) Tyrone Anderson; (United States) Mark Atkins; (United States) Chad Austin; (United States) Lawrence Barnes; (United States) Jermaine Blackburn; (United States) Ryan Blackwell; (United States) Nathan Blessen; (United States) DeAnthony Bowden; (United States) Barry Bradford; (United States) Gareth Bragg; (United States) Keenan Browder; (United States) Gerald Brown; (United States) Quinnel Brown; (United States) Willie Burton; (United States) Benson Callier; (United States) Maurice Carter; (United States) Akeem Clark; (United States) Shelly Clark; (United States) Lorenzo Coleman; (United States) Jaraan Cornell; (Panama) Ed Cota; (United States) Melvin Council; (United States) Joe Crispin; (United States) Carson Cunningham; (United States) Marlowe Currie; (United States) Michael Deemer; (United States) Rob Dye; (United States) Carl Edwards; (United States) Neil Edwards; (United States) Dane Fife; (United States) Shaun Fountain; (United States) Kevin Frey; (United States) Kenyon Gamble; (United States) Jarrod Gee; (United States) David Graves; (United States) Devin Gray; (United States) Ed Gray	(United States) Artie Griffin; (United States) Rob Griffin; (United States) Derek Grimm; (United States) Rylan Hainje; (United States) Antwon Hall; (United States) Darrin Hancock; (United States) Jonathan Harper; (United States) Terrance Hayes; (United States) Torrance Hayes; (United States) Evinn Herring; (United States) Ron Howard; (United States) Henry James; (United States) Marcus Jefferson; (United States) Rashi Johnson; (United States) Lonnie Jones; (United States) Torrian Jones; (Sierra Leone) Ishmieal Kamara; (United States) Chris King; (United States) Frankie King; (United States) Eric Kubel; (United States) Ronny LeMelle; (Italy) Steve Lepore; (United States) Marlon London; (United States) Kenneth Lowe; (United States) T. J. Lux; (United States) Sam Mack; (United States) Charles Macon; (United States) Renaldo Major; (United States) Mark McCarroll; (United States) Immanuel McElroy; (United States) Keith McLeod; (United States) Charlie Miller; (United States) Oliver Miller; (United States) Corey Minnifield; (United States) David Monds; (United States) Jamario Moon; (United States) Lee Nailon; (United States) Bryant Notree; (United States) Damian Owens	(United States) Royce Parran; (United States) Marshall Phillips; (Haiti) Olden Polynice; (United States) Milosh Pujo; (United States) Lonnie Randolph; (United States) Jemeil Rich; (United States) Eric Roberson; (United States) Keith Salscheider; (United States) Adam Schaper; (United States) Kevin Simmons; (United States) Lazarus Sims; (United States) Johnelle Slone; (United States) Leon Smith; (United States) Aaron Spears; (United States) Greg Springfield; (United States) Arthur Stapleton; (United States) Steven Strong; (The Bahamas) Judson Stubbs; (United States) Tevis Stukes; (Democratic Republic of the Congo) Bayonne Taty; (United States) Justus Thigpen; (United States) Aki Thomas; (United States) Tyron Triplett; (United States) Louis Truscott; (United States) LaMont Turner; (United States) DeAndre Walker; (United States) Phillip Watson; (United States) Daniel Watts; (United States) Chris Wesby; (United States) Louis White; (United States) Courtney Williams; (United States) Curtis Williams; (United States) Jermaine Williams; (United States) Jamal Wilson; (United States) Tim Winn; (United States) Ray Yagelski; (United States) Galen Young; (United States) Ray Young	(United States) Jaren Jackson; (United States) Frank Kendrick; (United States) Cliff Levingston; (United States) Rob Spon; (United States) Barry Stevens; (United States) Duane Ticknor
