= Brandon Williams (basketball, born 1975) =

American basketball player

Sacramento Kings
- Title: Assistant General Manager
- League: NBA

Personal information
- Born: February 27, 1975 (age 50) Collinston, Louisiana, U.S.
- Listed height: 6 ft 6 in (1.98 m)
- Listed weight: 215 lb (98 kg)

Career information
- High school: Phillips Exeter Academy (Exeter, New Hampshire)
- College: Davidson (1992–1996)
- NBA draft: 1996: undrafted
- Playing career: 1997–2005
- Position: Shooting guard / small forward
- Number: 11, 17

Career history
- 1997–1998: La Crosse Bobcats
- 1998: Golden State Warriors
- 1998–1999: La Crosse Bobcats
- 1999: San Antonio Spurs
- 1999–2000: La Crosse Bobcats
- 2000–2001: Rockford Lightning
- 2002–2003: Huntsville Flight
- 2003: Atlanta Hawks
- 2005: Sioux Falls Skyforce

Career highlights
- NBA champion (1999); CBA champion (2005); All-CBA Second Team (2000); CBA scoring champion (2000)
- Stats at NBA.com
- Stats at Basketball Reference

Brandon D. Williams (born February 27, 1975) is an American former professional basketball player.

== Playing career ==
Born in Collinston, Louisiana, Williams attended Phillips Exeter Academy and played collegiately for Davidson College. He played professionally in the NBA for the Golden State Warriors (1997–98), San Antonio Spurs (1998–99, NBA champions) and Atlanta Hawks (2002–03). He appeared in 18 NBA games with averages of 9.1 MPG, 2.3 PPG and 1.0 RPG. He was also under contract with the Toronto Raptors (1997), Milwaukee Bucks (1999 and 2004), New York Knicks (2000) and Seattle SuperSonics (2000), but never played any regular season games for those teams. Williams was named to the All-Continental Basketball Association (CBA) Second Team in 2000 while playing for the La Crosse Bobcats. He won a CBA championship with the Sioux Falls Skyforce in 2005.

== Post-playing career ==
In September 2013, he was named the general manager of the Delaware 87ers. On February 4, 2016, he was promoted to Chief of Staff for the Philadelphia 76ers. On July 30, 2017, Williams was hired as the new assistant general manager of the Sacramento Kings, replacing the role that was previously held by Scott Perry for only a few months. Aside from his basketball career, Williams attended law school at Rutgers Law and received his J.D. degree in 2012.
