= Jamel Thomas =

American basketball player

Personal information
- Born: July 19, 1976 (age 50) Brooklyn, New York, U.S.
- Listed height: 6 ft 6 in (1.98 m)
- Listed weight: 215 lb (98 kg)

Career information
- High school: Abraham Lincoln (Brooklyn, New York)
- College: Providence (1995–1999)
- NBA draft: 1999: undrafted
- Playing career: 1999–2009
- Position: Shooting guard / small forward
- Number: 5, 30

Career history
- 1999: Boston Celtics
- 1999–2000: Golden State Warriors
- 2000–2001: Quad City Thunder
- 2001: Memphis Houn'Dawgs
- 2001: New Jersey Nets
- 2001–2002: Phoenix Eclipse
- 2002–2003: Lauretana Biella
- 2003–2004: Apollon Patras
- 2004–2005: Navigo.it Teramo
- 2005: Panellinios
- 2006: Montepaschi Siena
- 2006–2007: Beşiktaş
- 2007: Angelico Biella
- 2007–2008: Eldo Napoli
- 2008–2009: Olympia Larissa

Career highlights
- CBA Rookie of the Year (2000); CBA All-Rookie Team (2000); CBA scoring champion (2001)
- Stats at NBA.com
- Stats at Basketball Reference

Jamel Thomas (born July 19, 1976) is an American former professional basketball player who played in the National Basketball Association (NBA). He was a 6 ft 6 in (1.98 m) swingman.

Thomas was born in Brooklyn. He played college basketball for the Providence Friars. Upon his 1999 graduation, he appeared in the National Basketball Association (NBA) during the 1999–2000 (three games for the Boston Celtics and four – for the Golden State Warriors) and 2000–01 (five games with the New Jersey Nets) seasons, holding career averages of 8.5 minutes, 2.6 points and 1.8 rebounds per game. He was also signed for a brief period by the Cleveland Cavaliers and Portland Trail Blazers (1999–2000) and Utah Jazz (2000–01), but never played for those teams in an NBA game.

He played two seasons in the Continental Basketball Association (CBA) and was selected as the CBA Rookie of the Year in 2000. After a stint in the American Basketball Association (ABA) and his New Jersey spell, Thomas moved overseas, mostly playing for teams in Turkey and Italy. In 2006–07 he played for Beşiktaş and Angelico Biella.

Thomas is the older half-brother of Sebastian Telfair who also played in the NBA. Thomas wrote a book about his life titled The Beautiful Struggle, which was released by Xlibris in late September 2008. In the book, Thomas comments on his half-brother, as well as on cousin Stephon Marbury.
