= Rusty LaRue =

American multi-sport athlete (born 1973)

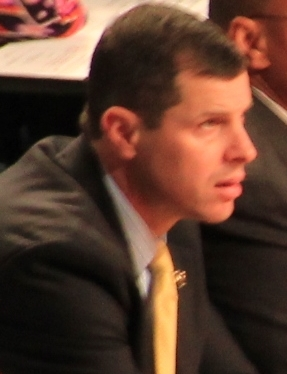
- LaRue in 2013

Personal information
- Born: December 10, 1973 (age 52) Winston-Salem, North Carolina, U.S.
- Listed height: 6 ft 2 in (1.88 m)
- Listed weight: 200 lb (91 kg)

Career information
- High school: Northwest Guilford (Greensboro, North Carolina)
- College: Wake Forest (1992–1996)
- NBA draft: 1996: undrafted
- Playing career: 1996–2004
- Position: Point guard
- Number: 5
- Coaching career: 2004–present

Career history

Playing
- 1996: Carolina Cardinals
- 1996: Paris Basket Racing
- 1997: Connecticut Pride
- 1997: Idaho Stampede
- 1997–1999: Chicago Bulls
- 1999–2000: Idaho Stampede
- 2000–2001: CSKA Moscow
- 2001–2002: Asheville Altitude
- 2002: Utah Jazz
- 2002–2003: Pallacanestro Varese
- 2003–2004: Asheville Altitude
- 2004: Golden State Warriors

Coaching
- 2004–2005: Greensboro College
- 2005–2009: Forsyth Country Day School
- 2009–2014: Wake Forest (assistant)
- 2015–2019: West Forsyth HS

Career highlights
- NBA champion (1998); All-CBA Second Team (2000); CBA assists leader (2000)
- Stats at NBA.com
- Stats at Basketball Reference
Medals
Men's basketball
Representing United States
FIBA Americas Championship
Gold medal – first place	1997 Montevideo	Team competition

Rusty LaRue (born December 10, 1973) is an American basketball coach and former professional player. He was a multi-sport athlete who played basketball, football, and baseball at Wake Forest University. LaRue played in the National Basketball Association (NBA) for the Chicago Bulls, Utah Jazz and Golden State Warriors. He won an NBA championship with the Bulls in 1998.

LaRue began his coaching career after his playing retirement in 2004. He was an assistant coach for the Wake Forest Demon Deacons basketball team under head coaches Dino Gaudio and Jeff Bzdelik from 2009 to 2014. He served as the head coach of the West Forsyth High School basketball team since 2015. LaRue retired from coaching in 2019 and is now the Chief Operations Officer of Dairi-O Restaurants.

== High school and college ==
LaRue attended Northwest Guilford High School in Greensboro, North Carolina, where, in addition to being an honors student, he earned All-State honors in football, basketball, and baseball. As a senior, he was named the 1991–92 NCHSAA Male Athlete of the Year, and attracted the attention of many colleges before choosing to attend Wake Forest, where he planned to play both basketball and football in the ACC. LaRue also played collegiate baseball for one season, becoming just the second player in ACC history to play three sports in the same year. He was one of only four players to beat Duke at Cameron Indoor Stadium all four years, the others being Tim Duncan, Tyler Hansbrough, and Danny Green.

LaRue arguably had his most collegiate success on the football field. As a freshman quarterback in 1992, he was a member of Wake Forest's football team that took home an Independence Bowl victory, and during his senior year he broke eight NCAA records for passing, including the record for most completions in one game (55). However, LaRue was a solid basketball player as well, helping his teammates reach the NCAA Tournament for four consecutive seasons. He finished second in school history in three-point field goals made, and finished first all-time in three-point field goal percentage.

== Professional playing career ==
After college, LaRue decided to focus exclusively on basketball because there were more opportunities to play professionally. Though he was not drafted by an NBA team, he earned a spot on the Chicago Bulls' roster in 1997 after honing his craft in the minor leagues for one season. During the 1997–98 NBA season, LaRue averaged 3.5 points per game in limited playing time and earned an NBA Championship ring in the process. He would receive more minutes during the next season after Michael Jordan, Scottie Pippen, Dennis Rodman, and Steve Kerr left the team, and he averaged 4.7 points and 1.5 assists per game while making 33.7% of his three-point field goal attempts. However, the Bulls cut ties with LaRue during the 1999–2000 NBA season as they continued their post-dynasty rebuilding process. He returned to the minor leagues and was selected to the All-Continental Basketball Association (CBA) Second Team while playing for the Idaho Stampede in 2000. He signed with the Russian team CSKA Moscow in 2000.

After a year in Russia, LaRue returned to America and briefly played for the NBA's Utah Jazz during the 2001–02 NBA season (signed January 28, 2002) before going back to the European leagues, where he joined the Italian team Pallacanestro Varese. In 2003, he returned to the NBA, this time as a member of the Boston Celtics, but he was waived before appearing in a regular season game; he would appear in four games for the Golden State Warriors towards the end of the season.

== Coaching career ==
LaRue served as head men's basketball coach at Greensboro College in 2004–05 and later was athletics director and basketball coach at Forsyth Country Day School in Winston-Salem.

In 2009, he re-joined the Wake Forest men's basketball program as an assistant coach under Dino Gaudio. He was retained as an assistant by new head coach Jeff Bzdelik in 2010. He was released by Wake Forest's new coach, Danny Manning in 2014.

On June 30, 2015, LaRue was named the new men's basketball coach at West Forsyth High School. West Forsyth was attended by Chris Paul, another former Wake Forest player. LaRue retired from coaching in 2019 and is now the Chief Operations Officer of Dairi-O Restaurants.

== NBA career statistics ==
Legend
GP	Games played	GS	Games started	MPG	Minutes per game
FG%	Field goal percentage	3P%	3-point field goal percentage	FT%	Free throw percentage
RPG	Rebounds per game	APG	Assists per game	SPG	Steals per game
BPG	Blocks per game	PPG	Points per game	**Bold**	Career high
†	Won an NBA championship

=== Regular season ===
Year	Team	GP	GS	MPG	FG%	3P%	FT%	RPG	APG	SPG	BPG	PPG
1997–98†	Chicago	14	0	10.0	**.408**	.250	.625	.6	.4	.2	.1	3.5
1998–99	Chicago	**43**	**6**	17.0	.359	.337	**1.000**	1.3	1.5	.8	.1	4.7
1999–00	Chicago	4	1	**32.3**	.349	.143	.714	**2.5**	**2.8**	**1.8**	.0	**9.3**
2001–02	Utah	33	0	16.4	.395	.340	.857	1.5	2.2	.5	**.2**	5.8
2003–04	Golden State	4	0	5.5	.333	**1.000**	.500	.8	.5	.5	.0	1.0
Career		98	7	16.0	.376	.318	.841	1.3	1.6	.6	.1	5.0

=== Playoffs ===
Year	Team	GP	GS	MPG	FG%	3P%	FT%	RPG	APG	SPG	BPG	PPG
2001–02	Utah	4	0	13.3	.375	.400	.600	1.5	1.5	.2	.0	5.0
Career		4	0	13.3	.375	.400	.600	1.5	1.5	.2	.0	5.0
