= Jemeil Rich =

American basketball player (born 1975)

Personal information
- Born: January 31, 1975 (age 51) Gary, Indiana
- Listed height: 5 ft 11 in (1.80 m)
- Listed weight: 180 lb (82 kg)

Career information
- High school: Theodore Roosevelt (Gary, Indiana)
- College: Olive–Harvey College (1993–1994); SMU (1994–1997)
- NBA draft: 1997: undrafted
- Playing career: 1998–2007
- Position: Point guard

Career history
- 1998–1999: Dallas Express
- 1999: Sakalai
- 2000: BC Alita
- 2000–2001: Lugano Snakes
- 2001–2002: Basket Napoli
- 2002: Sutor Montegranaro
- 2002–2003: Gary Steelheads
- 2003: Texas RimRockers
- 2003–2004: Gary Steelheads
- 2004: ASVEL Villeurbanne
- 2004–2005: Gary Steelheads
- 2005: Gatos de Monagas
- 2005: Oklahoma Storm
- 2005–2006: Sioux Falls Skyforce
- 2006: Chorale Roanne
- 2006–2007: Fort Worth Flyers
- 2007: Skyliners Frankfurt

Career highlights
- All-Euroleague Second Team (2001); 2× All-CBA Second Team (2004, 2005); 2× CBA All-Defensive Team (2003, 2004)

Jemeil de Juan Rich (born January 31, 1975) is a retired American professional basketball player.

== Pro career ==
After graduating from the Southern Methodist University in 1997, he was successful in international play, spending several seasons in Europe, including periods of time spent on teams in France, Switzerland, and Germany. He never got a chance to play in the NBA, although he participated in an Orlando Magic preseason game in 2004.

His performances in the Euroleague earned him a spot on the All-Euroleague Second Team in the Euroleague 2000-01 season, while he was playing for the Lugano Snakes.

Rich played for the Gary Steelheads of the Continental Basketball Association (CBA) from 2002 to 2005. He was selected as a member of the All-CBA Second Team in 2004 and 2005, and the All-Defensive Team in 2003 and 2004.

An explosive point guard, Rich ended his career playing for the Frankfurt Skyliners in the German Basketball Bundesliga.
