= Derek Grimm =

American professional basketball player (born 1974)

Personal information
- Born: August 3, 1974 (age 52) Peoria, Illinois, U.S.
- Listed height: 6 ft 9 in (2.06 m)
- Listed weight: 230 lb (104 kg)

Career information
- High school: Morton (Morton, Illinois)
- College: Missouri (1993–1997)
- NBA draft: 1997: undrafted
- Position: Small forward
- Number: 54

Career history
- 1997: Sacramento Kings
- 1998–1999: Hitachi Osaka
- 1999: Shell Turbo Chargers
- 1999–2000: St. Louis Swarm
- 2001–2002: Kansas City Knights
- 2002: Darüşşafaka
- 2002–2003: Dakota Wizards
- 2003–2004: Bashkimi
- 2005: Gary Steelheads
- 2005: Fastlink
- Stats at NBA.com
- Stats at Basketball Reference

William Derek Grimm (born August 3, 1974) is an American professional basketball player.

A 6'9" forward from the University of Missouri, Grimm was never drafted by a National Basketball Association (NBA) team but did play for the Sacramento Kings during the 1997–98 NBA season. He appeared in nine games and scored a total of 14 points. Born in Peoria, Illinois, he was selected by the La Crosse Bobcats in the fifth round (50th overall) of the 1997 CBA Draft. He also played with the CBA's Dakota Wizards in 2003 and with the Gary Steelheads in 2005.

He has also played professionally in the IBL, Turkey, Kosovo, Philippines, Poland, Netherlands, and Japan.
