= Michael Hawkins (basketball) =

American basketball player (born 1972)

Personal information
- Born: October 28, 1972 (age 54) Canton, Ohio, U.S.
- Listed height: 6 ft 0 in (1.83 m)
- Listed weight: 178 lb (81 kg)

Career information
- High school: Canton McKinley (Canton, Ohio)
- College: Xavier (1991–1995)
- NBA draft: 1995: undrafted
- Playing career: 1995–2006
- Position: Point guard
- Number: 5, 7, 17

Career history
- 1995–1997: Rockford Lightning
- 1997: Boston Celtics
- 1997–1998: Olympiacos
- 1998–1999: Rockford Lightning
- 1999: Sacramento Kings
- 1999–2000: Charlotte Hornets
- 2000–2001: Cleveland Cavaliers
- 2001: Sioux Falls Skyforce
- 2001: FC Barcelona
- 2001–2002: Idea Śląsk
- 2002: Real Madrid
- 2002–2003: Telindus Oostende
- 2003–2004: Sioux Falls Skyforce
- 2004–2005: La Palma
- 2005–2006: Al-Jalaa Aleppo

Career highlights
- As a player: Spanish League champion (2001); Spanish Cup winner (2001); Greek League All-Star (1997); Polish League champion (2002); All-Polish League Foreigners Team (2002); CBA All-Star (1997); All-CBA Second Team (1997); CBA All-Defensive Team (1997); CBA assists leader (1997); CBA steals leader (1997); Second-team All-MCC (1995)
- Stats at NBA.com
- Stats at Basketball Reference
Medals
Men's basketball
Representing United States
FIBA World Championship
Bronze medal – third place	1998 Greece	National team
Pan American Games
Silver medal – second place	Winnipeg 1999	National team

Steven Michael Hawkins (born October 28, 1972), is an American former professional basketball player. During his professional club career, Hawkins played in the National Basketball Association (NBA), and in several other leagues around the world.

== College career ==
Hawkins, a 6-foot-0-inch (1.83 m) tall point guard, along with his classmate and future NBA player Eric Snow, played high school basketball at Canton McKinley High School, where Hawkins graduated from in 1991. After high school, Hawkins played college basketball at Xavier University, where he played with the Xavier Musketeers, from 1991 to 1995.

== Professional career ==
After not being selected in the 1995 NBA draft out of when he signed with the Boston Celtics in 1997. Over the next four years he played for three other NBA teams, finally finishing his short NBA career with his hometown Cleveland Cavaliers in 2001.

Hawkins played in the Continental Basketball Association (CBA) for the Rockford Lightning from 1995 to 1997 and during the 1998–99 season, and the Sioux Falls Skyforce during the 2000–01 and 2003–04 seasons. He was selected to the All-CBA Second Team in 1997 and All-Defensive Team in 1997.

Hawkins ended his pro club career with Al-Jalaa Aleppo, of the Syrian Basketball League.

== National team career ==
Hawkins played with the USA national team at the 1998 FIBA World Championship. With Team USA, he won a bronze medal at that tournament. He also played with Team USA at the 1999 Pan American Games, where he won a silver medal.

== Coaching career ==
After he retired from playing pro club basketball, Hawkins began working as a coach. He coaches in the Houston area, with the private coaching service, CoachUp.
