= Sam Mack =

American basketball player (born 1970)

Personal information
- Born: May 26, 1970 (age 56) Chicago, Illinois, U.S.
- Listed height: 6 ft 7 in (2.01 m)
- Listed weight: 220 lb (100 kg)

Career information
- High school: Thornridge (Dolton, Illinois)
- College: Iowa State (1988–1989); Tyler JC (1990–1991); Houston (1991–1992)
- NBA draft: 1992: undrafted
- Playing career: 1992–2013
- Position: Small forward
- Number: 5, 4, 6, 2, 7

Career history
- 1992: New Haven Skyhawks
- 1992–1993: San Antonio Spurs
- 1993–1994: Rapid City Thrillers
- 1993–1994: Yakima Sun Kings
- 1994: Fort Wayne Fury
- 1994–1995: Oklahoma City Cavalry
- 1995–1996: Rockford Lightning
- 1995–1997: Houston Rockets
- 1997–1999: Vancouver Grizzlies
- 1999: Houston Rockets
- 1999–2000: Golden State Warriors
- 2000–2001: Grand Rapids Hoops
- 2001: Marinos de Oriente
- 2001: Miami Heat
- 2001–2002: Avtodor Saratov
- 2004–2005: Michigan Mayhem
- 2005: Aguas de Calpe
- 2007: Gary Steelheads
- 2008–2009: Halifax Rainmen
- 2009–2013: Chicago Steam

Career highlights
- All-CBA Second Team (1996); CBA scoring champion (2005); ABA All Star-Game (2010); Second-team All-SWC (1992)

Career NBA statistics
- Points: 2,011
- Rebounds: 533
- Assists: 336
- Stats at NBA.com
- Stats at Basketball Reference

Sam Mack (born May 26, 1970) is an American former professional basketball player. The 6'7" shooting guard from Dolton, Illinois played with five different NBA teams over a 10-year span and has had a 20-year international basketball career.

== College ==
After starring at Thornridge High School, Mack signed with Iowa State, where he started and averaged 11.8 points as a freshman for a Cyclones team that would make the 1989 NCAA tournament before losing to UCLA. Mack was arrested and charged with armed robbery in Ames, Iowa in March 1989 when he participated in a holdup at a Burger King. Mack was shot in the foot and hip as he tried to flee police. He was later acquitted when a jury decided that Iowa State football player Levin White, a transfer from USC, had forced him at gunpoint to be his accomplice. Cyclone coach Johnny Orr did not renew Mack's basketball scholarship and he transferred to Arizona State as one of coach Bill Frieder's first recruits.

In November 1989, he was suspended from the ASU team during his redshirt season after being investigated in connection with a sexual assault. No charges were filed after the Maricopa County attorney's office found insufficient evidence to pursue a woman's claim that Mack raped her in a university dormitory. in March 1990 Mack and a former Arizona State football player, Fedel Underwood, were arrested and charged with credit card fraud after trying to buy jewelry with a stolen card. Frieder dismissed Mack from the team before he ever played in a game for the Sun Devils.

After Mack's dismissal from ASU, assistant George McQuarn recommended him to Roy Thomas, the coach at Tyler Junior College. Finally with Thomas, a noted disciplinarian, and in relative obscurity in East Texas Mack was a good fit. He averaged 24.6 points and 8.7 rebounds for the Apaches in '90-'91, hitting 62% from the field and 42% from three-point range. More importantly, after two years marked by serious run-ins with the law, Mack stayed out of trouble and was recommended to Houston coach Pat Foster. Because of Mack's checkered past, Foster had Mack vetted by both the UH athletic director and university president, who both interviewed Mack and gave their approval.

Mack's final collegiate season was a huge success, as he averaged 17.5 points in 31 games for the Cougars 1991-92 and, along with Bo Outlaw, led them to a 25–6 record and an NCAA Tournament appearance. For his efforts, Mack was named the SWC Newcomer of the Year.

== Professional career ==
After going undrafted in 1992, Mack played in the USBL with the New Haven Skyhawks in 1992. He signed as a free agent by the San Antonio Spurs in September 1992 and played in 40 games as a reserve (6.7 mpg) during the '92-'93 season before being waived. He spent the next three years playing in the CBA and being named to the 1995–96 CBA All-League Second Team. Mack appeared in 119 career CBA games, averaging 16.1 ppg, 3.5 rpg and 2.0 apg.

Mack got his big chance to show what he could do at the NBA level in 1996 when he began the year in the CBA playing for the Rockford Lightning, averaging 20.7 points and 4.3 rebounds. He was selected to the All-CBA Second Team in 1996. This performance attracted the attention of the back-to-back NBA Champion Houston Rockets, who had recently lost Clyde Drexler to injury and signed Mack to two 10-day contracts in February 1996. Mack came through for the Rockets by averaging 10.8 points and 3.2 rebounds, playing in 31 games and making 20 starts. His first career NBA start came on February 27 against Toronto and he scored 11 points in 34 minutes. Mack scored in double figures 13 times, including four games of 20 points or more. He scored a career-high 38 points against Golden State on April 2, and also had games of 26 points vs. Phoenix on April 21 and 25 points at Seattle on April 3. He shot 54-for-135 from three-point range (40%). Mack appeared in six of Houston's eight playoff games, helping them beat the Los Angeles Lakers in the first round.

Mack was traded by the Rockets to the Vancouver Grizzlies for a second-round draft pick in October 1997. He became the Grizzlies' starting shooting guard, averaging 10.8 ppg in '97-'98 and 12.7 pg in '98-'99. Mack was ranked 8th in the NBA in three-pointers made (87), 14th in three-pointers attempted (214) and 17th in three-point percentage (.397) in 1999. Set Grizzlies' franchise records with 8 three-pointers in 13 attempts, scoring a game-high 26 points, in a 96–92 win over the Dallas Mavericks on 2/14/99. Led the Grizzlies in 1997-98 and established career-highs in three-pointers made (110) and attempted (269). Because of his prolific shooting, Mack was invited to compete in the AT&T Shootout during the 1998 NBA All-Star Weekend in New York.

Mack was traded back to the Rockets by the Grizzlies for Rodrick Rhodes in March 1999 but would never be a regular NBA starter again. He signed as a free agent by the Golden State Warriors in January 2000 but was waived in late March of that season. Played in the CBA and IBL with the Grand Rapids Hoops in 2000–01 before signing as a free agent by the Miami Heat on 9/14/01. He played in 12 games for Miami and made one start. Mack started in 105 of the 259 NBA games in which he appeared. He averaged 8 points, 2.1 rebounds, and 1.3 assists in his NBA career.

Over the next 10 years Mack played for several teams both in the US and abroad, having success well into his late 30s. Mack last played for the ABA's Chicago Steam. He was named to the ABA's all-star team in 2010 and 2011, at the age of 40.
