= East Kentucky Miners =

Professional American basketball team

- Founded: 2007
- League: CBA 2007-2009; ABA 2009
- Team history: East Kentucky Miners; 2007-2009
- Based in: Pikeville, Kentucky
- Arena: Eastern Kentucky Expo Center 2007-2009 various 2009
- Colors: Black, Silver, & White
- Owner: PSE Group (headed by Kevin Keathley)
- Head coach: Kevin Keathley
- Championships: 0
- Dancers: Diamond Girls
- Mascot: Hard Hat Harry

The East Kentucky Miners were a professional basketball team in the American Basketball Association that began play as a member of the Continental Basketball Association (CBA) in the 2007–2008 season. The Miners, announced in the local paper, and on the Trinity Sports & Entertainment Group (headed by Jay Fiedler)'s website, were formally announced by the league on July 6, 2007

The Miners were coached by Kevin Keathley for the 2007–2008 season. Keathley is the former coach of the Kentucky Colonels

Though the team may be considered to be a continuation of the Florida Pit Bulls/Miami Majesty, ownership considers the team to be an expansion franchise.

During the 2007–2008 season the Miners scored 194 points in a game, a CBA record. They finished the season with a 26–22 record.

The Miners' finished an abbreviated 2008–2009 season with a 7–7 record, with 13 remaining games canceled after the CBA halted operations midseason.

The Miners then joined the American Basketball Association the following July. Despite expectations of fielding a team into November and potential sponsors lined up, the team never appears to have ever played a game in the ABA.
