= 1984 CBA All-Star Game =

1984 CBA-organized All-Star Game

| CBA All-Stars | Wyoming Wildcatters |
|---|---|
| 128 (OT) | 125 |
- Date: January 31, 1984
- Venue: Casper Events Center, Casper
- MVP: Anthony Roberts
- Attendance: 7,398

The 1985 Continental Basketball Association All-Star Game was the 22nd All-Star Game organized by CBA since its inception in 1949 and the 4th under the name of CBA. It was held at the Casper Events Center in Casper, Wyoming on January 31, 1984, in front of a crowd of 7,398. The hosts Wyoming Wildcatters were defeated by the CBA All-Stars 125–128.

Anthony Roberts of Wyoming Wildcatters was named the MVP.

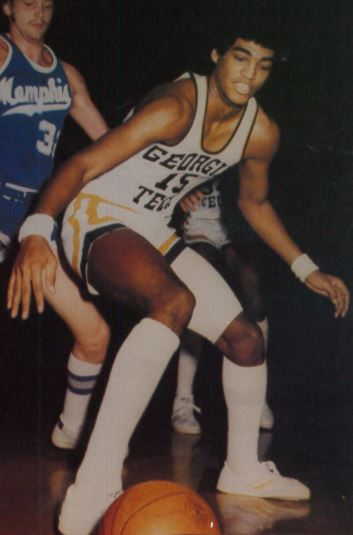
Tico Brown featured for the CBA All-Stars.

== The 1984 CBA All-Star Game ==
The 4rth edition was hosted by the Wildcatters, owned by Tom Hedges, a petroleum wholesaler. The Casper Events Center opened in June 1982 and had an 8,842 at the time (average attendance for regular-season games in 1983-84 season was 1,523). It was then the CBA's largest arena behind Cobo Hall in Detroit. Casper was a city of population 83,779 in 1984.

There were no slam-dunk or shoot events.

=== The Game ===
The CBA All-Stars coached by Bill Klucas of Wisconsin Flyers won the game with 128-25.

Anthony Roberts scored 43 pts for the Wyoming Wildcatters ho ended on the losing side. The game was decided in overtime: Robert Smith scored a three-pointer at 68 seconds into the overtime and his shot proved to be the winner.

== All-Star teams ==
=== Rosters ===
Wyoming Wildcatters
| Pos. | Player | Previous Appearances |
Team
| G | (United States) Del Beshore | |
| F | (United States) Anthony Roberts | |
| G | (United States) Boot Bond | |
| G | (United States) Larry Anderson | |
| F | (United States) Dave Johnson | |
| F | (United States) Sam Mosley | |
Head coach: Jack Schalow

CBA All-Stars
| Pos. | Player | Team | Previous appearances |
Team
| F | (United States) Kevin Graham | Wisconsin Flyers | |
| F | (United States) Bob Miller | Louisville Catbirds | |
| G | (United States) Mike Wilson | Wisconsin Flyers | |
| F | (United States) Joe Dawson | Bay State Bombardiers | |
| F | (United States) Reggie Gaines | Louisville Catbirds | |
| C | (United States) Charles Jones | Bay State Bombardiers | |
| F | (United States) Ralph McPherson | Albany Patroons | 1983 |
| G | (United States) Tico Brown | Detroit Spirits | 1983 |
| G | (United States) Robert Smith | (Canada) Toronto Tornados | 1983 |
Head coach: Bill Klucas (Wisconsin Flyers )

=== Result ===
| Team 1 | Score | Team 2 |
|---|---|---|
| CBA All-Stars | 128- 125 (OT) | Wyoming Wildcatters |

== Awards ==
| MVP | Topscorer |
|---|---|
| (United States) Anthony Roberts | (United States) Anthony Roberts |

== Former NBA players ==
- (United States) Anthony Roberts
- (United States) Robert Smith
- (United States) Del Beshore

== See also ==
- 1985 CBA All-Star Game
- 1983 CBA All-Star Game
- Continental Basketball Association

== Sources ==
- HISTORY OF THE CBA ALL STAR GAME
- Inaugural Game Had Stormy Start
