= 1983 CBA All-Star Game =

1988-89 CBA organised All-Star Game

CBA All-Stars	Albany Patroons
109	122
- Date: February 21, 1983
- Venue: Washington Avenue Armory, Albany, New York
- MVP: Larry Spriggs
- Attendance: 2,773

The 1983 Continental Basketball Association All-Star Game was the 20th All-Star Game organised by the league since its inception in 1949 and the 3d under the name of CBA. It was held at the Washington Avenue Armory in Albany, New York on February 21, 1983, in front of 2,773 spectators. The hosts Albany Patroons defeated the CBA All-Stars 122–109.

Larry Spriggs of Albany Patroons was named the MVP.

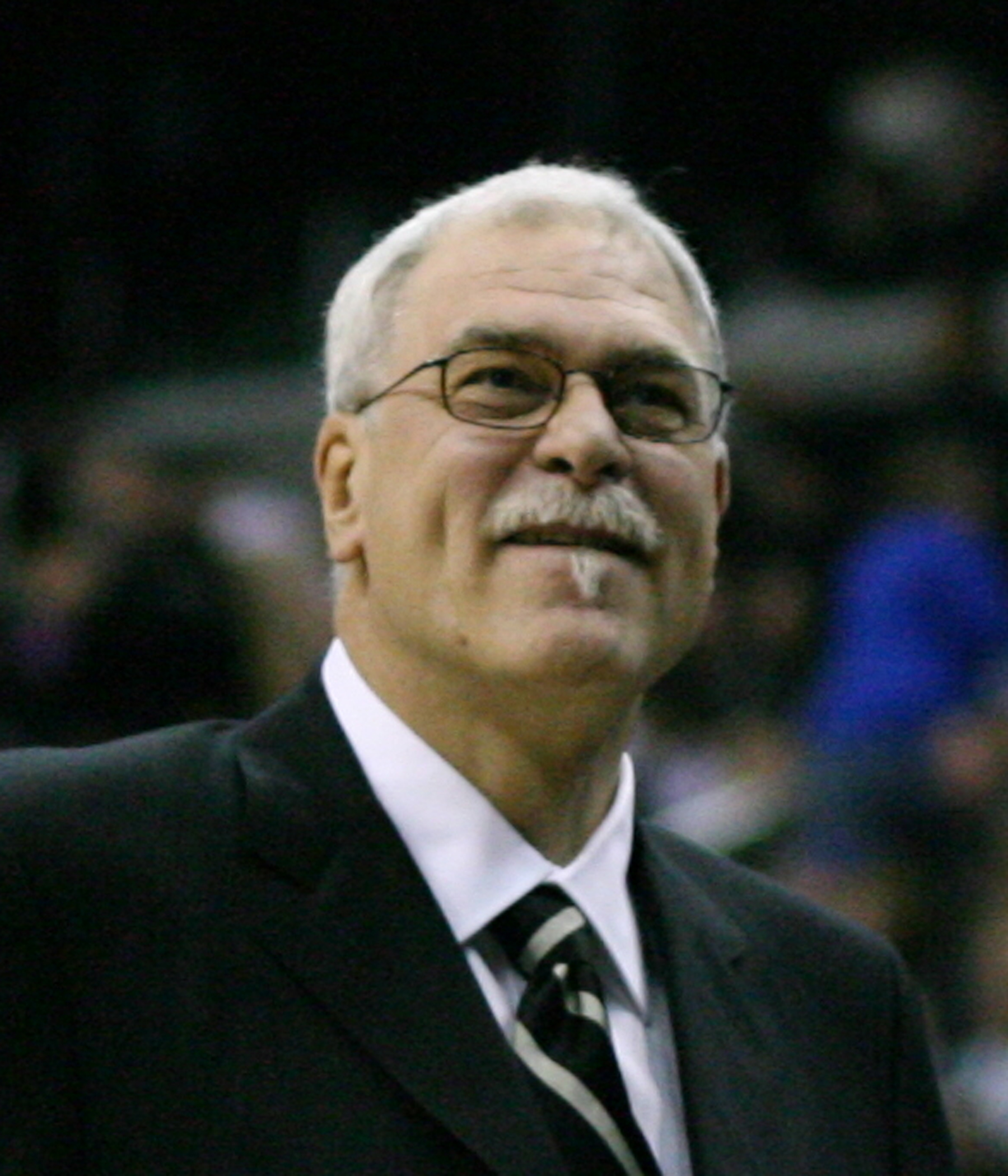
Phil Jackson of Albany Patroons coached the Albany Patroons.

== The 1983 All-Star Game ==
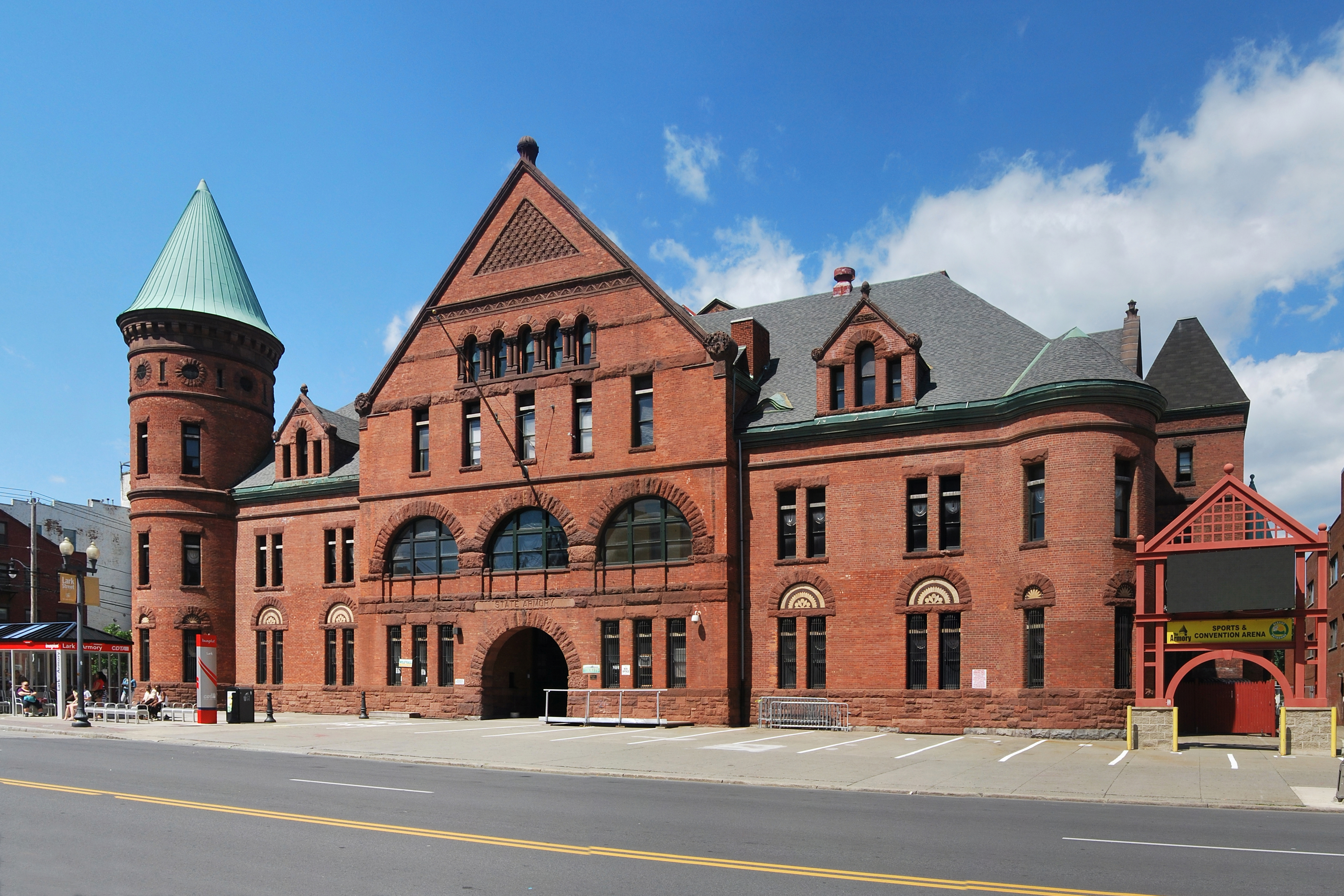
Exterior of the Washington Avenue Armory.

During half-time a randomly selected fan took the $1 Million CBA Super Shot from the court centre. Scout Dick McGuire of New York Knicks was at the stands to watch Mike Davis of the Patroons. At the time an average NBA player made $246,000 a year, while the average C.B.A. player made $5,000.

The hosts were chosen for the All-Star Game despite leading the CBA league in attendance in the 1982–83 season.

=== The Game ===
Larry Spriggs of Albany Patroons scored 22 points, and also had seven rebounds and four assists. Half-time score was 62-58 for the Patrrons.

Phil Jackson, a former New York Knicks player was the winning coach. He had recently taken over the bottom-place Albany Patroons (East Conference) leading them to six victories in eight league matches.

== All-Star teams ==
=== Rosters ===
Albany Patroons
Pos.	Player	Points	Previous appearances
Starters
G	(United States) Phil Seymore	6 pts	
F	(United States) Hollis Copeland	13 pts	
F	(United States) Ralph McPherson	20 pts	
F	(United States) Frankie Sanders	16 pts	
C	(United States) Mike Davis	16 pts	
Reserves
G	(United States) John Leonard	10 pts	
F	(United States) James Ratiff	9 pts	
F	(United States) Larry Spriggs	22 pts	
G	(United States) Sam Worthen	4 pts	
G	(United States) Derrick Rowland	6 pts	
Head coach: (United States) Phil Jackson

CBA All-Stars
Pos.	Player	Team	Points	Previous appearances
Starters
G	(United States) Al Smith	Rochester Zeniths	8 pts	
G	(United States) Tico Brown	Detroit Spirits	6 pts	
G	(United States) Kevin Figaro	Ohio Mixers	10 pts	
F	(United States) Clarence Kea	Detroit Spirits	10 pts	
C	(United States) Joe Kopicki	Wisconsin Flyers	17 pts	
Reserves
F	(United States) Joe Cooper	Lancaster Lightning	10 pts	
F	(United States) Charles Thompson	Wyoming Wildcatters	8 pts	
G	(United States) John Douglas	Montana Golden Nuggets	11 pts	
F	(United States) Jim Smith	Reno Bighorns	3 pts	
F	(United States) Robert Smith	Montana Golden Nuggets	9 pts	
Head coach:

=== Result ===
Team 1	Score	Team 2
Albany Patroons	122- 109	CBA All-Stars

== Awards ==
MVP	Topscorer
(United States) Larry Spriggs	(United States) Larry Spriggs

== Former NBA players ==
- (United States) Al Smith
- (United States) Hollis Copeland
- (United States) Larry Spriggs

== See also ==
- 1985 CBA All-Star Game
- 1984 CBA All-Star Game
- Continental Basketball Association

== Sources ==
- HISTORY OF THE CBA ALL STAR GAME at oklahoman.com
- Inaugural Game Had Stormy Start at oklahoman.com
