= 1985 CBA All-Star Game =

1985 CBA-organized All-Star Game

CBA All-Stars	Evansville Thunder
113	109
- Date: February 17, 1985
- Venue: Roberts Municipal Stadium, Evansville
- MVP: Rick Lamb
- Attendance: 8,537

The 1985 Continental Basketball Association All-Star Game was the 23rd All-Star Game organized by CBA since its inception in 1949. It was held at the Roberts Municipal Stadium in Evansville, Indiana on February 17, 1985, in front of league-record crowd of 8,537. The hosts Evansville Thunder were defeated by the CBA All-Stars 109–113.

Rick Lamb was named the MVP in front of more than 12 NBA scouts in attendance.

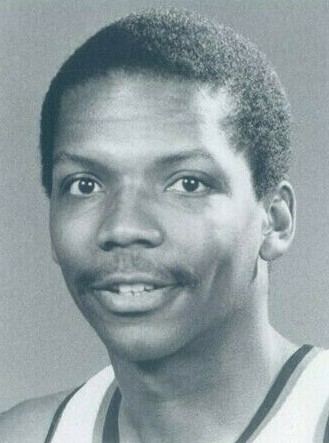
Former Portland Trail Blazers player Linton Townes featured for the CBA All-Stars.

Evansville Thunder sold the largest number of the 1984–85 season tickets to become hosts of the annual All-Star game. The event introduced the 'Ton of Money CBA Free Throw,' a randomly-selected ticketholder who could score a foul shot could take home 500,000 pennies, or $5,000.

== The 1985 CBA All-Star Game ==
There were no slam-dunk or shoot events.

=== The Game ===
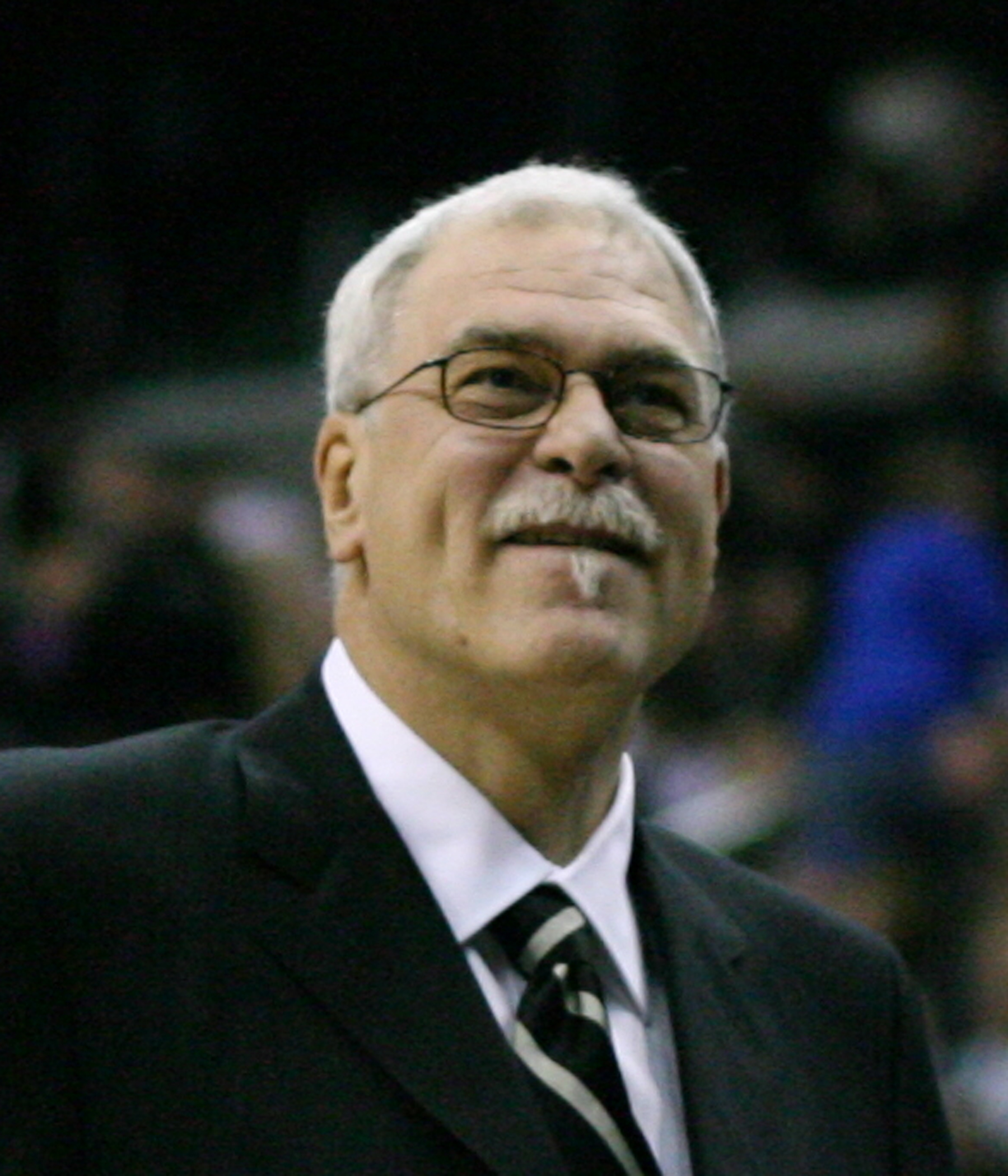
Phil Jackson of Albany Patroons coached the CBA All-Stars.

The CBA All-Stars took a seven-point lead after the first quarter (half-time: 53–48). They then went up 87–71 after three quarters and had a 17-point lead with 4 minutes and 15 seconds before the end. Rick Lamb scored 19 points to lead the CBA All-Stars, while the Thunder was led by former New York Knicks player DeWayne Scales with 24 pts. Also Mike Clark, finished with 12 points (7 in the last minute) and 6 rebounds and Claude Gregory had 17 rebounds for the Thunder.

Joe Cooper had 17 pts and 10 rebs, and Ralph McPherson scored 17 points, while Robert Smith had 10 assists for the All-Stars.

== All-Star teams ==
=== Rosters ===
Evansville Thunder
Pos.	Player	Previous Appearances
Team
F	(United States) Claude Gregory	
G	(United States) Greg Jones	
F	(United States) Albert Irving	
G	(United States) Mike Clark	
F	(United States) Donnie Koonce	
C	(United States) Micah Blunt	
F	(United States) DeWayne Scales	
Head coach:

CBA All-Stars
Pos.	Player	Team	Previous appearances
Team
F	(United States) Ralph McPherson	Albany Patroons	1983, 1984
F	(United States) Linton Townes	Tampa Bay Thrillers	
G	(United States) Robert Smith	(Canada) Toronto Tornados	1983, 1984
C	(United States) Rick Lamb	Wyoming Wildcatters	
F	(United States) Joe Cooper	Lancaster Lightning	
Head coach: Phil Jackson

=== Result ===
Team 1	Score	Team 2
CBA All-Stars	113–109	Evansville Thunder

== Awards ==
MVP	Topscorer
(United States) Rick Lamb	(United States) DeWayne Scales

== See also ==
- 1987 CBA All-Star Game
- 1983 CBA All-Star Game
- Continental Basketball Association

== Sources ==
- HISTORY OF THE CBA ALL STAR GAME
- Inaugural Game Had Stormy Start
