= Dwight Anderson (basketball) =

American basketball player (1960–2020)

Personal information
- Born: December 28, 1960 Dayton, Ohio, U.S.
- Died: September 5, 2020 (aged 59) Dayton, Ohio, U.S.
- Listed height: 6 ft 3 in (1.91 m)
- Listed weight: 185 lb (84 kg)

Career information
- High school: Roth (Dayton, Ohio)
- College: Kentucky (1978–1980); USC (1980–1982)
- NBA draft: 1982: 2nd round, 41st overall pick
- Drafted by: Washington Bullets
- Position: Point guard
- Number: 20

Career history
- 1982–1983: Denver Nuggets
- 1982–1983: Ohio Mixers
- 1983–1985: Albuquerque Silvers
- 1985: Cincinnati Slammers
- 1985–1986: Evansville Thunder
- 1986: Shell Oilers

Career highlights
- CBA scoring champion (1985); First-team All-Pac-10 (1982); McDonald's All-American (1978); First-team Parade All-American (1978)
- Stats at NBA.com
- Stats at Basketball Reference

Dwight Anthony Anderson (December 28, 1960 – September 5, 2020) was an American professional basketball player.

== College career ==
Born in Dayton, Ohio, Anderson graduated from Roth High School in Dayton. He played for the University of Kentucky 1978–1980, scoring 13 PPG on 50FG%. From 1981 to 1982 he played for University of Southern California scoring 20 PPG on 40FG%.

== Professional career ==
Anderson was selected by the Washington Bullets in the 2nd round of the 1982 NBA draft. He played one season for Denver Nuggets during 1982–83. Anderson also spent several seasons in the Continental Basketball Association with the Ohio Mixers, Albuquerque Silvers, Cincinnati Slammers and Evansville Thunder. In 112 CBA games, Anderson averaged 21.0 points per game.

== Career statistics ==
Legend
GP	Games played	GS	Games started	MPG	Minutes per game
FG%	Field goal percentage	3P%	3-point field goal percentage	FT%	Free throw percentage
RPG	Rebounds per game	APG	Assists per game	SPG	Steals per game
BPG	Blocks per game	PPG	Points per game	**Bold**	Career high

=== NBA ===
==== Regular season ====
Year	Team	GP	GS	MPG	FG%	3P%	FT%	RPG	APG	SPG	BPG	PPG
1982–83	Denver	5	0	6.6	.500	–	.700	.4	.6	.2	.0	4.2
