= 1987 CBA All-Star Game =

1987 CBA organised All-Star Game

CBA All-Stars	La Crosse Catbirds
105	102
- Date: February 2, 1987
- Venue: La Crosse Center, La Crosse
- MVP: Eddie Johnson
- Attendance: 6,010
- Network: ESPN

The 1987 Continental Basketball Association All-Star Game was the 25th All-Star Game organised by CBA since its inception in 1949. It was held at the 6,000-seat La Crosse Center in La Crosse, Wisconsin on February 2, 1987, in front of a sell-out crowd. The hosts La Crosse Catbirds were defeated by the CBA All-Stars 102–105.

Eddie Johnson was named the MVP.

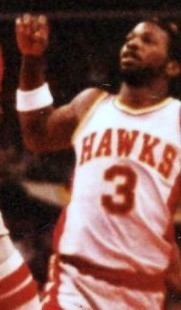
Former Atlanta Hawks Eddie Johnson was named the MVP

The All-Star Game coincided with CBA's best season ever in attendances (up to then) with Catbirds averaging almost 4,700 fans in the 1986–87 season. The game was the first to be televised live by ESPN.

== The 1987 CBA All-Star Game ==
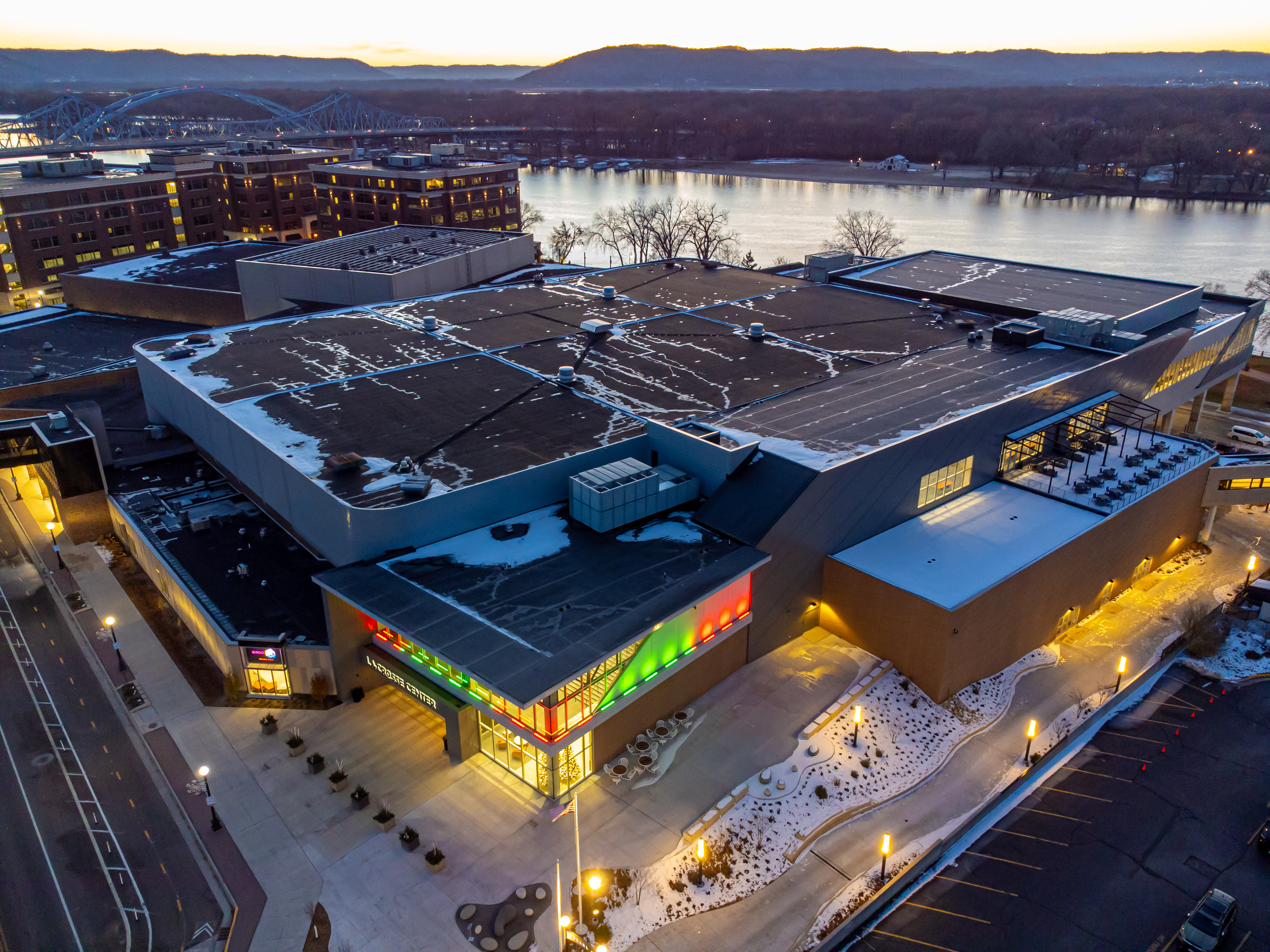
The La Crosse Center

There were no slam-dunk or shoot events.

=== The Game ===
Catbirds did not have center Cozell McQueen at their disposal as he had moved to France in January 1987. Eddie Johnson of the CBA All-Stars was the top scorer of the match with 22 pts.

== All-Star teams ==
=== Rosters ===
La Crosse Catbirds
Pos.	Player	Previous Appearances
Team
F	(United States) Claude Gregory	1985
G	(United States) Carlos Clark	
C	(United States) John Campbell	
F	(United States) Anthony Frederick	
G	(United States) Myron Jackson	
G	(United States) Anthony Watson	
G	(United States) Vince Hamilton	
F	(United States) Vada Martin	
C	(United States) Brian Christensen	
Head coach:

CBA All-Stars
Pos.	Player	Team	Previous appearances
Team
F	(United States) Don Collins	Tampa Bay Thrillers	
G	(United States) Eddie Johnson	Tampa Bay Thrillers	
G	(United States) (Republic of Ireland) Ron Rowan	Topeka Sizzlers	1987
F	(United States) Joe Binion	Topeka Sizzlers	
G	(United States) Bryan Warrick	Rockford Lightning	
C	(United States) Jim Lampley	Rockford Lightning	
G	(United States) Kenny Natt	Albany Patroons	
G	(United States) Derrick Rowland	Albany Patroons	
C	(United States) Rick Lamb	Pensacola Tornados	1985
F	(United States) Peter Verhoeven	Charleston Gunners	
Head coach:

=== Result ===
Team 1	Score	Team 2
CBA All-Stars	105 - 102	La Crosse Catbirds

== Awards ==
MVP	Topscorer
(United States) Eddie Johnson	(United States) Eddie Johnson

== See also ==
- 1985 CBA All-Star Game
- Continental Basketball Association

== Sources ==
- HISTORY OF THE CBA ALL STAR GAME
- Inaugural Game Had Stormy Start
