= Joe Merten =

Basketball player (1959–2008)

Personal information
- Born: February 23, 1959 Kenosha, Wisconsin, U.S.
- Died: March 18, 2008 (aged 49) Eau Claire, Wisconsin, U.S.
- Listed height: 6 ft 7 in (2.01 m)

Career information
- High school: George Nelson Tremper (Kenosha, Wisconsin)
- College: Wisconsin–Eau Claire (1977–1981)
- NBA draft: 1981: 10th round, 207th overall pick
- Drafted by: Utah Jazz
- Playing career: 1981–1985
- Position: Small forward

Career history

Playing
- 1982–1983: Alberta Dusters
- 1983: Las Vegas Silvers
- 1983–1985: Wisconsin Flyers

Coaching
- 1985–1986: Wisconsin Flyers

Career highlights
- CBA All-Star (1982); 3× All-WSUAC (1979–1981)
- Stats at Basketball Reference

Joseph H. Merten (February 23, 1959 – March 19, 2008) was an American basketball player and coach. He played small forward and his listed height was 6 feet 7 inches (2.01 m).

== Biography ==
Merten attended the University of Wisconsin–Eau Claire from 1977 to 1981 and played for head coach Ken Anderson's Blugolds men's basketball team. Merten played in 113 games (93 of which he started) for the Blugolds, who appeared in the NAIA Final Four during his final two seasons (1980, 1981). During his four years with the Blugolds, Merten accumulated 1,193 points, 598 rebounds and 439 assists. He named to the All-Wisconsin State University Athletic Conference Team three times.

In 1979 Merten was a member of the United States men's national basketball team at the World University Games. The team, which featured future NBA player Kevin McHale, won a gold medal.

He was drafted in the 10^{th} round of the 1981 NBA draft by the Utah Jazz and played for their Summer Pro League team, but failed to make the preseason roster. He played exhibition games with the Milwaukee Bucks during the 1981 NBA preseason, but was cut from their regular season roster. He made two unsuccessful NBA tryouts during the summer of 1982 with the Bucks and Indiana Pacers.

In 1981 Merten signed with the Alberta Dusters of the Continental Basketball Association (CBA). On January 20, 1982, Merten scored 42 points in a game. He appeared in the 1982 CBA All-Star game as a member of the Dusters. Merten signed with the Las Vegas Silvers in 1982, but was traded during the season to the Wisconsin Flyers. He was named head coach of the Flyers before the 1985–86 season. He was the youngest coach in the CBA at the time of his hiring.

Merten was offered the head coaching position of the Flyers for the 1986–87 season but turned down the offer. He went to work for Menards in Eau Claire as a building materials manager.

There is an annual award known as the Joe Merten Coaching Award given out by the University of Wisconsin–Eau Claire Blugold Hall of Fame. It was created by Merten's family following his death on March 19, 2008. The award is given to an assistant coach, community coach, or student coach on a Blugolds sports team.
