= Victor Fleming (basketball) =

American basketball player (born 1962)

Personal information
- Born: February 2, 1962 (age 64) New York City, New York, U.S.
- Listed height: 6 ft 6 in (1.98 m)
- Listed weight: 170 lb (77 kg)

Career information
- High school: Long Island City (New York City, New York)
- College: Xavier (1980–1984)
- NBA draft: 1984: 2nd round, 26th overall pick
- Drafted by: Portland Trail Blazers
- Position: Small forward
- Number: 30

Career history
- 1984–1987: Cincinnati Slammers

Career highlights
- CBA All-Star (1986); First-team All-MCC (1984)
- Stats at Basketball Reference

Victor Fleming (born February 2, 1962) is an American former professional basketball player who was selected by the Portland Trail Blazers in the second round (26th pick overall) of the 1984 NBA draft. Fleming was a 6'6" forward from Xavier University and is the twin brother of former NBA player Vern Fleming.

== Early life ==
Victor Fleming was born in New York City and attended Long Island City High School in New York City, New York.

== College career ==
In college, Fleming played for Xavier in Cincinnati, Ohio from 1980 to 1984. He averaged 9.3 points, 2.6 rebounds and 1.6 assists in his career. As a Senior, Fleming averaged 14.6 points, 4.2 rebounds and 1.7 assists, as Xavier finished 22–11 under coach Bob Staak. For his career, Fleming scored 1,059 points, joining Xavier's "1000 Point Club."

As a freshman in 1980–1981, playing for Coach Bob Staak, Fleming averaged 5.6 points, 1.1 rebounds and 1.6 assists, starting five games. Xavier finished 12–16, but won the Midwestern City Conference regular season championship with an 8–3 record. Xavier was defeated by Oklahoma City 82–76 in the Midwestern City Conference Tournament Final.

In his sophomore season, 1981–1982, Fleming averaged 4.6 points, 1.4 rebounds and 1.2 assists, playing in 26 games and starting nine. Xavier finished 8–20 and 1–11 in the Midwestern City Conference.

Xavier advanced to the 1983 NCAA tournament, as Fleming became a starter in 1982–1983. Fleming started 29 games as Xavier finished 22–8 and 10–4 (2nd) in the Midwestern City Conference. Fleming averaged 10.8 points, 3.1 rebounds and 1.8 assists for the season. Xavier then advanced to the NCAA by winning the Midwestern City Conference Tournament. Xavier defeated Detroit Mercy 90–70 in the semi-final. In the Final, Xavier defeated Loyola (Chicago) 82–76. In the NCAA Tournament Opening Round, Xavier lost 81–75 to Alcorn State in the Midwest Regional preliminary round. Fleming led Xavier with 16 points in the NCAA loss to Alcorn State.

Xavier advanced to the National Invitational Tournament in 1983–1984. In his senior season, Xavier finished 22–11 as Fleming averaged 14.6 points, 4.2 rebounds and 1.7 assists on 54% shooting, starting all 33 games. Xavier finished 9–5 (3rd) in the Midwest City Conference. Fleming had a career high 29 points against Butler. In the National Invitational Tournament, Xavier defeated Ohio State 60-57 and Nebraska 58–57, before falling to Michigan 63–62 in the NIT Quarterfinals.

== Professional career ==
On June 19, 1984, the Portland Trail Blazers selected Victor Fleming in the 1984 NBA draft in Round 2, with the No. 26 overall pick. Fleming was selected a few picks behind his brother Vern Fleming, who was drafted at No. 18 by the Indiana Pacers. Cut by Portland, Victor Fleming was later signed by the San Antonio Spurs and Phoenix Suns, but never appeared in an NBA game.

Fleming played for the Cincinnati Slammers in the Continental Basketball Association in 1984–1985 to 1986–1987 and was selected to the 1986 CBA All-Star team, as he averaged 15.1 points and 3.7 rebounds for the Cincinnati Slammers.
