= Steven Smith (basketball) =

American basketball player (born 1983)

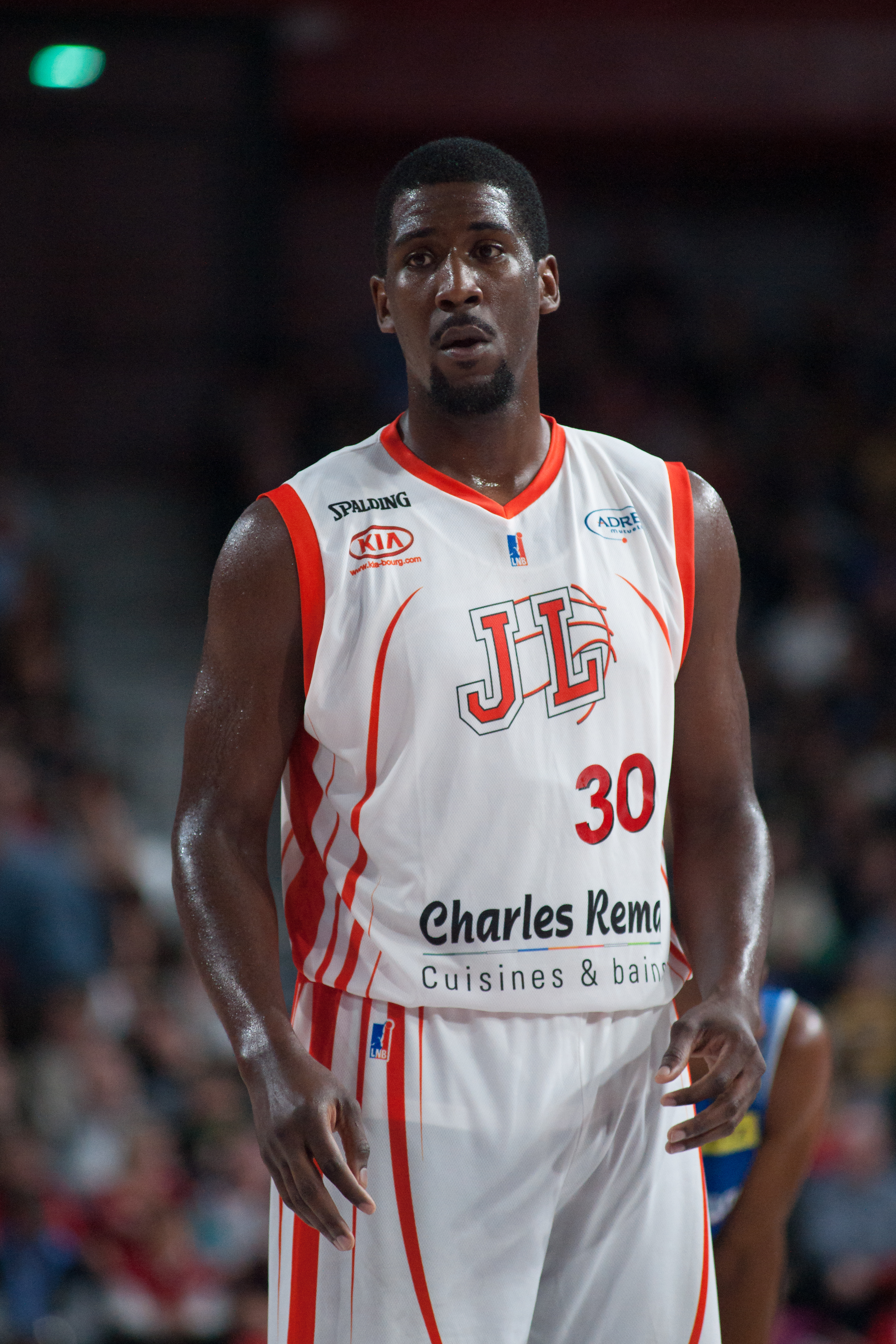
- Smith in 2014

Personal information
- Born: April 12, 1983 (age 43) Philadelphia, Pennsylvania, U.S.
- Listed height: 6 ft 8 in (2.03 m)
- Listed weight: 235 lb (107 kg)

Career information
- High school: Northeast (Philadelphia, Pennsylvania)
- College: La Salle (2002–2006)
- NBA draft: 2006: undrafted
- Playing career: 2006–2018
- Position: Small forward / power forward
- Number: 30

Career history
- 2006–2007: Philadelphia 76ers
- 2007: Anaheim Arsenal
- 2007: Sevilla
- 2007–2008: Anaheim Arsenal
- 2008: Solsonica Rieti
- 2008–2009: Kolossos Rodou
- 2010: Ironi Nahariya
- 2010: EWE Baskets Oldenburg
- 2010–2011: Panellinios
- 2011–2012: Panathinaikos
- 2012–2014: Virtus Bologna
- 2014: Austin Toros
- 2014–2015: JL Bourg-en-Bresse
- 2015–2016: Élan Béarnais Pau-Orthez
- 2016–2017: Champagne Châlons-Reims
- 2017–2018: Quimsa
- 2018: Olympique Antibes

Career highlights
- Greek Cup winner (2012); 2× Atlantic 10 Player of the Year (2005, 2006); 2× First-team All-Atlantic 10 (2005, 2006)
- Stats at NBA.com
- Stats at Basketball Reference

Steven Alexander Smith (born April 12, 1983) is an American former professional basketball player. Standing at 6 ft 9 in (2.06 m), he played both forward positions. He played college basketball for the La Salle Explorers.

== College career ==
Smith is a graduate of Northeast High School, and later La Salle University, where he won the Atlantic 10 Conference Player of the Year twice, in 2005 and 2006.

== Professional career ==
After starting the 2006-07 NBA season with the Philadelphia 76ers, Smith was waived in January 2007. In eight total NBA games, he averaged 0.6 points and 0.8 rebounds per game. He also played for the Anaheim Arsenal of the D-League during the 2007–08 season.

In February 2008, he joined the Italian League pro club Solsonica Rieti and finished the 2007–08 season there. He signed with the Greek League pro club Kolossos Rodou for the 2008–09 season. After averaging 18.3 points per game in 21 games, he suffered an Achilles tendon rupture and missed the rest of the season.

In August 2010, he signed with the German Eurocup team EWE Baskets Oldenburg, but he was released in December. He then played in Greece with Panellinios, and later with Panathinaikos.

On March 24, 2014, he was signed by the Austin Toros.

On August 8, 2014, he was signed by French team Bourg-en-Bresse.

On August 19, 2015, he signed with Élan Béarnais Pau-Orthez.

On June 23, 2016, Smith signed with Champagne Châlons-Reims.

On October 2, 2017, Smith signed in Argentina with Quimsa of the Liga Nacional de Básquet.
