= David Cooke (basketball) =

American basketball player (born 1963)

Personal information
- Born: September 27, 1963 (age 63) Sacramento, California, U.S.
- Listed height: 6 ft 8 in (2.03 m)
- Listed weight: 230 lb (104 kg)

Career information
- High school: Christian Brothers (Sacramento, California)
- College: Saint Mary's (1981–1985)
- NBA draft: 1985: undrafted
- Playing career: 1985–1991
- Position: Power forward
- Number: 14

Career history
- 1985: Sacramento Kings
- 1985–1986: Wisconsin Flyers
- 1986–1987: Maristas Málaga
- 1988–1989: Elitzur Netanya
- 1989–1990: BBC Monthey
- 1990–1991: CEB Llíria
- 1991–1992: Joventut Alcalá
- 1992–1993: CB Mataró
- 1993: CB Murcia
- 1993–1994: Boca Juniors
- 1994–1995: Elitzur Netanya
- 1995–1996: Spirou Charleroi
- 1996–1997: Guaros de Lara
- 1997–1998: Central Entrerriano
- Stats at NBA.com
- Stats at Basketball Reference

David D. Cooke (born September 27, 1963) is an American former professional basketball player who had a brief career with the National Basketball Association's Sacramento Kings. Born in Sacramento, California, he was a 6'8", 230 lb power forward and played college basketball at Saint Mary's College of California.

Cooke attended Christian Brothers High School in Sacramento, having graduated in 1981 and averaged 16 points and 11.9 rebounds per game during his senior season.

Playing six games for the Kings during the 1985-86 NBA season, Cooke averaged 1.5 points and 1.7 rebounds per game. He also played for the Wisconsin Flyers of the Continental Basketball Association that season.

== Career statistics ==
Legend
GP	Games played	GS	Games started	MPG	Minutes per game
FG%	Field goal percentage	3P%	3-point field goal percentage	FT%	Free throw percentage
RPG	Rebounds per game	APG	Assists per game	SPG	Steals per game
BPG	Blocks per game	PPG	Points per game	**Bold**	Career high

=== NBA ===
==== Regular season ====
Year	Team	GP	GS	MPG	FG%	3P%	FT%	RPG	APG	SPG	BPG	PPG
1985–86	Sacramento	6	0	6.3	.182	–	.500	1.7	.2	.7	.0	1.5
