= Wisconsin Flyers =

- League: CBA
- Founded: 1982
- Folded: 1987
- Location: Oshkosh, Wisconsin
- Team colors: blue, white

The Wisconsin Flyers were a professional basketball team based in Oshkosh, Wisconsin, United States. They were members of the Continental Basketball Association (CBA) from 1982 to 1987. The team relocated to Rochester, Minnesota at the conclusion of the 1986–87 season.

== Team history ==
Killian Spanbauer, the owner of a sporting good chain based in Oshkosh, had publicly stated as early as 1981 that he wanted to form a minor league basketball circuit with 6–8 teams across Wisconsin. Nothing more appeared in the media until the winter of 1981–1982 when Spanbauer announced he was seeking a franchise in the Continental Basketball Association for Oshkosh. The area had a rich history of basketball, dating back to the All-Stars of the National Basketball League (1937–1949). At the time, Spanbauer made it quite clear that the CBA needed more than one franchise in the Midwest in order to expand. In May 1982, it happened, as the league added the Wisconsin Flyers (based in Oshkosh, Wisconsin), the Detroit Spirits, and the Ohio Mixers (based in Lima, Ohio). All three teams would be placed in the same division – the Central.

=== 1982–83 season ===
The Flyers suffered a setback immediately, when head coach Dave Wohl took an assistant's position with the New Jersey Nets before the season began. Dave Harshman was tabbed to take over the team. As an expansion team, Wisconsin never jelled, though it sent Joe Kopicki to the NBA. Steve Burks led the team in points, assists, steals and minutes played.

Most of the Western Division, the Billings Volcanos and the Reno Bighorns folded. The two remaining teams were the Albuquerque Silvers (who had moved from Las Vegas during the season) and Wyoming, were placed in a new Western Division with Wisconsin, Detroit, Ohio and the Louisville Catbirds (an expansion team). In the East, Rochester folded, while Maine moved to Brockton, Massachusetts and were renamed the Bay State Bombardiers. The Bombardiers joined the Albany Patroons and Lancaster Red Roses, holdovers from the Eastern Division, and three expansion teams – the Toronto Tornados, Sarasota Stingers and the Puerto Rico Coquis.

=== 1983–84 season ===
Gene "Torchy" Clark, who had been coaching collegiate basketball in Florida, was named the third head coach of the Flyers in the off-season. Clark had ties to the area as a successful high school coach in the 1960s and 1970s and he took a one-year sabbatical from his duties at the University of Central Florida to take the Flyers job, but he never coached an actual game for Wisconsin. A few weeks before training camp, Clark and owner Killian Spanbauer had a falling-out. The rumors were over certain player signings, but the facts were never revealed in the local media. The only answers available are from a November 30, 1983 article in the Appleton Post Crescent by John L. Paustain, who had interviewed Clark about his resignation. According to that article, Clark needed and wanted an assistant coach and had assumed that John Spanbauer, the son of owner Killian Spanbauer, would be available to help. When Clark's assumption proved false Killian offered to make player Joe Mertens Clark's assistant. Clark did not want this, but had another in mind for the job to whom Clark had previous ties. Killian refused Clark's request, and Clark quit. Clark summed it up saying "I just thought if we disagree about this, it could get worse." Clark's relationship with Killian had been troubled prior to this, and apparently Clark decided this was enough. Bill Klucas, who was CBA coach of the year with the Anchorage Northern Knights in 1979–1980, was available and came on board. The 1983–84 Flyers featured an exciting cast of players – Jose Slaughter, Greg Jones (CBA Rookie of the Year), Steve Lingenfelter (CBA Newcomer of the Year), and Kevin Graham. Graham was named to the CBA Second-Team and the First-Team All-Defense. Slaughter was named to the Second-Team All-Defense. Wisconsin started out sluggish, then turned red hot down the stretch and held off the defending champion Detroit Spirits for the Western Division title.

Wisconsin (27-17) defeated the Ohio Mixers (23-21) in five games to win the Western Division semi-final series. The Mixers would announce they were moving to Cincinnati, as the Slammers, shortly afterwards. In the Western finals, Wyoming (23-21) shocked the Flyers by winning three of four. The Wildcatters would go on to lose to Albany and head coach Phil Jackson in the CBA finals.

=== 1984–85 season ===
For the first time, there were rumblings that the Flyers could be moving to greener pastures if attendance did not improve. They still played a majority of their games at Oshkosh North High School Fieldhouse. Bill Klucas returned, as did Jose Slaughter (24.0 PPG). Slaugher was named to the CBA All-League team and the All-Defensive team. Greg Jones was lost to Evansville in the expansion draft and would lead the Thunder to the playoffs. Dale Wilkinson would add to the offensive firepower before being called to the Clippers. His loss would send the Flyers from the top of the West to a battle for a playoff spot. Wisconsin would manage to hold off Louisville for the fourth and final berth. Another factor which hurt the Flyers down the stretch – in addition to Wilkinson being called up – was Killian Spanbauer announcing the franchise was up for sale in February. The remainder of the season would be played under the shadow of who was going to buy the team and where they would be in 1985–1986.

Wisconsin (21-27) faced the Western Division champion Wyoming Wildcatters (24-24). The 'Catters won the first two games in Wyoming, before the series swung back to Oshkosh. The Flyers won Game Three and then made it interesting with a Game Four win, which included a bench-clearing brawl which involved the fans. With a heavy police presence, Wisconsin crushed Wyoming in Game Five, 98–84. The Detroit Spirits (23-25) were rested after downing Evansville (23-25) in four games. Detroit would crush Wisconsin in three games to win the Western Division title, but would lose the CBA title to the expansion Tampa Bay Thrillers in seven games. It would be the last playoff appearance in Wisconsin history, and the last of Bill Klucas. He would replace Jack Schalow in Wyoming, after he could not agree on a contract extension with Spanbauer.

=== 1985–86 season ===
The Flyers appeared to be on the right track, as Killian Spanbauer added five partners after turning down offers from La Crosse and Milwaukee to buy the franchise. Dean Moede, who was president of the team's fan club, was named general manager, and former player Joe Merten, who was 27, was named head coach. McKinley Singleton picked up the offense after the loss of Jose Slaughter, averaging 20.0 PPG. Bryan Warrick led the CBA in assists with 9.9 PPG, and set a franchise record with 24 in one game. Cozell McQueen finished in the top ten in rebounding (9.9 PPG) and blocked shots (2.1 PPG). Tommy Davis was second in the CBA with 46 three-pointers. In the end, the season was a disaster. Needing 1,800-2,000 fans per game to break even, the team drew 1,492 to its home opener, and it never got any better. Season ticket sales dropped from 560 to 250. Moede resigned as GM before the season began, and was replaced by former Ohio Mixer head coach John Nillen. Merten even had to suit up for the second half of the season due to roster problems and a lack of money.

=== 1986–87 season ===
The end was in sight for the Wisconsin Flyers. Bill Klucas, who had led Wyoming to a 21–27 record in 1985–86, returned as head coach. Greg Jones also returned and led the team in scoring (21.9 PPG). He led the CBA in three-pointers – 68. Jones was third in the CBA in steals (2.2 PPG) and assists (7.3 PPG), replacing Bryan Warrick, who was sent to Rockford, as point guard. McKinley Singleton was still an offensive force (19.3 PPG). He had the best free throw percentage in the league – 87.2 percent. T. Tony Brown finished in the top ten in rebounding (10.3 PPG) and blocked shots (2.3 PPG), and was named to the second team All-Defense. In the end, all of these positives could not contribute to a winning season. Wisconsin finished 22–26, and had 153.5 standings points, eight behind Rockford for the final Western Division playoff berth. Wyoming finished fifth with a 21–27 record, but had 160.5 points.

All through the 1986–87 season, it was apparent that the Wisconsin Flyers were in trouble. Killian Spanbauer and the minority owners placed the team back on the market during the season. The most serious offer came from Rochester, Minnesota. With no prospect of an arena being built in the Fox Valley, the franchise was moved for the 1987–88 season. The team spent two seasons in Rochester before moving to Omaha, Nebraska.

== Legacy ==
An NBA G League team named the Wisconsin Herd was awarded to Oshkosh in 2017; the team wore Wisconsin Flyers throwback jerseys at one of their first games on December 9, 2017.

== All-time roster ==
- Norm Anchrum
- Robert Armstrong
- Jerry Beck
- Tom Boswell
- Darrell Browder
- T. Tony Brown
- Steve Burks
- Gary Carter
- David Cooke
- Jewell Crawford
- Tommy Davis
- Joedy Gardner
- Chris Giles
- Kevin Graham
- Chris Harrison
- Gib Hinz
- John Horrocks
- Ed James
- Greg Jones
- Joe Kopicki
- Wayne Kreklow
- Steve Lingenfelter
- Oliver Mack
- Cozell McQueen
- Joe Merten
- Sam Mitchell
- Bill Nelson
- Russell Pierre
- Bobby Potts
- Ulysses Reed
- Dedrick Reffigee
- Chauncey Robinson
- Nate Rollins
- Ed Sherod
- McKinley Singleton
- Jose Slaughter
- Darryl Space
- John Spanbauer
- Kevin Sprewer
- Vince Taylor
- David Thirdkill
- Brent Timm
- Bryan Warrick
- Dale Wilkinson
- Brian Wilson
- Mike Wilson
- Howard Wood

== See also ==
- Oshkosh All-Stars
- Wisconsin Herd
