= Atlantic 10 Conference Men's Basketball Player of the Year =

US college sport award

A-10 Conference Men's Basketball Player of the Year
- Awarded for: the most outstanding basketball player in the Atlantic 10 Conference
- Country: United States

History
- First award: 1977
- Most recent: Robbie Avila, Saint Louis

The Atlantic 10 Conference Men's Basketball Player of the Year is an award given to the Atlantic 10 Conference's (A-10) most outstanding player. The award was first given following the conference's inaugural 1976–77 season, when the conference was officially known as the Eastern Collegiate Basketball League but popularly known as the Eastern 8. David West of Xavier is the only player to have won the award three times (2001–2003). Four other players (James Bailey, Earl Belcher, Greg Jones and Steven Smith) have won the award twice. Three players have also won the award in the same season that they were named the Naismith College Player of the Year or received the John R. Wooden Award, the nation's two most prestigious men's college basketball awards: Marcus Camby in 1996, Jameer Nelson in 2004, and Obi Toppin in 2020.

As of 2026, Temple has the most all-time winners with 10, but the Owls left for what is now the American Conference in July 2013. Among current conference members, Saint Joseph's has the most with five; UMass, which left the A-10 in 2025, also has five. There have been four ties in the award's history (1983, 2005, 2018, 2024). Three current member schools have had no winners—Fordham, George Mason, and the league's newest member Loyola Chicago, which joined in 2022.

== Key ==
†	Co-Players of the Year
*	Awarded a national player of the year award that same season: Helms Foundation College Basketball Player of the Year (1904–05 to 1978–79); UPI College Basketball Player of the Year (1954–55 to 1995–96); Oscar Robertson Trophy (1958–59 to present); Naismith College Player of the Year (1968–69 to present); John R. Wooden Award (1976–77 to present)
Player (X)	Denotes the number of times the player has been awarded the A-10 Player of the Year award at that point

== Winners ==
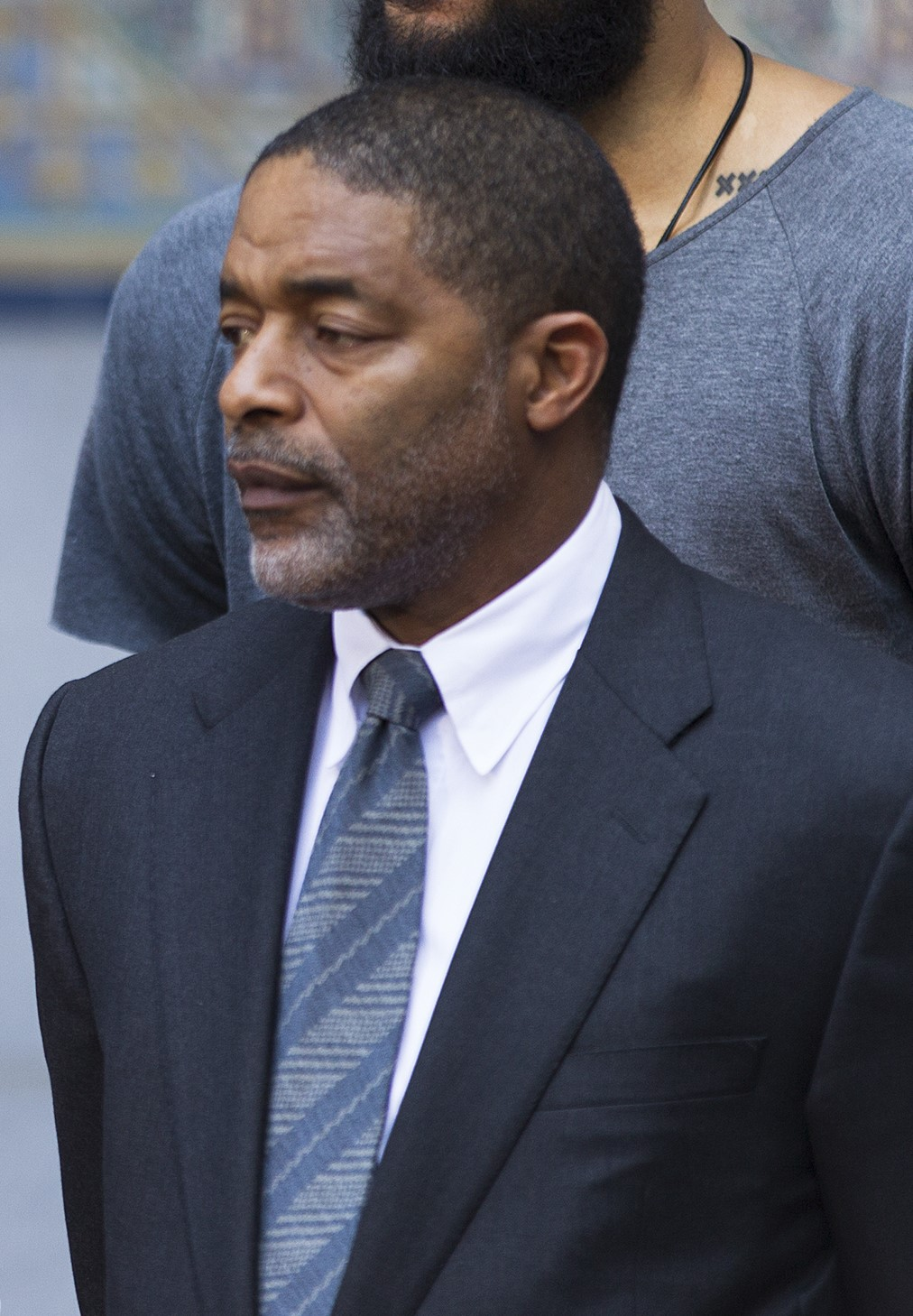
Norm Nixon, Duquesne, 1977

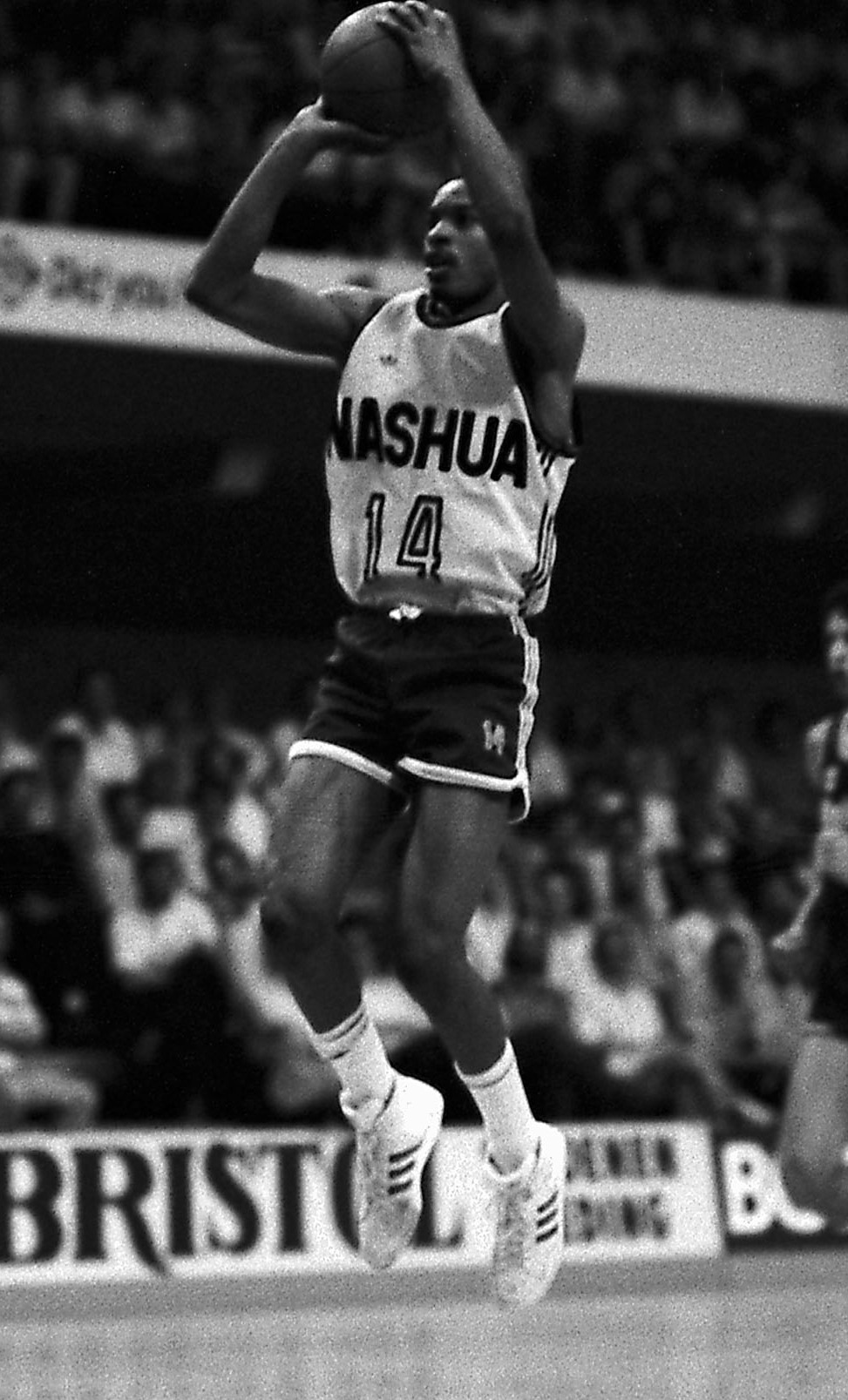
Terence Stansbury, Temple, 1984

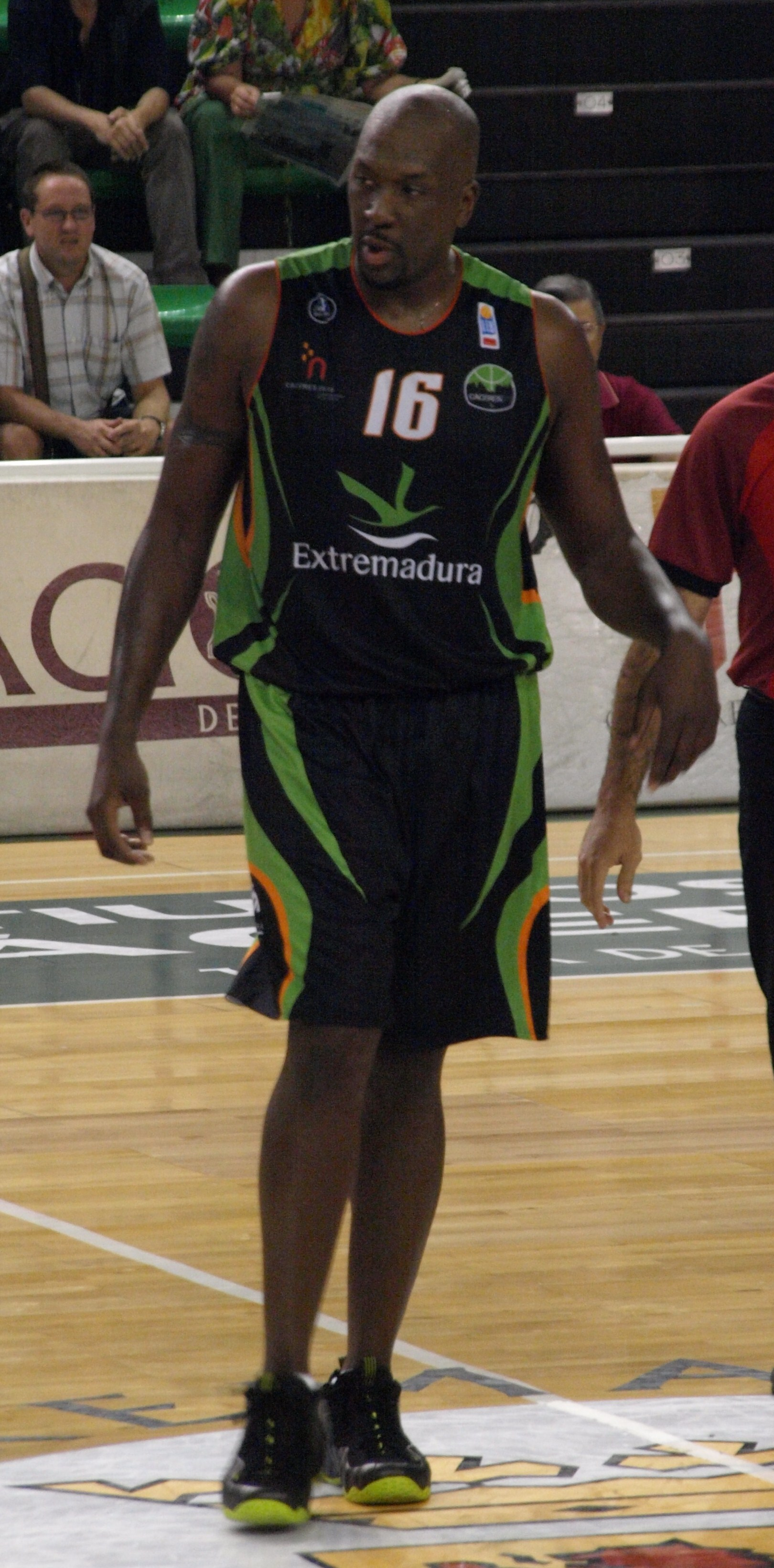
Harper Williams, UMass, 1992

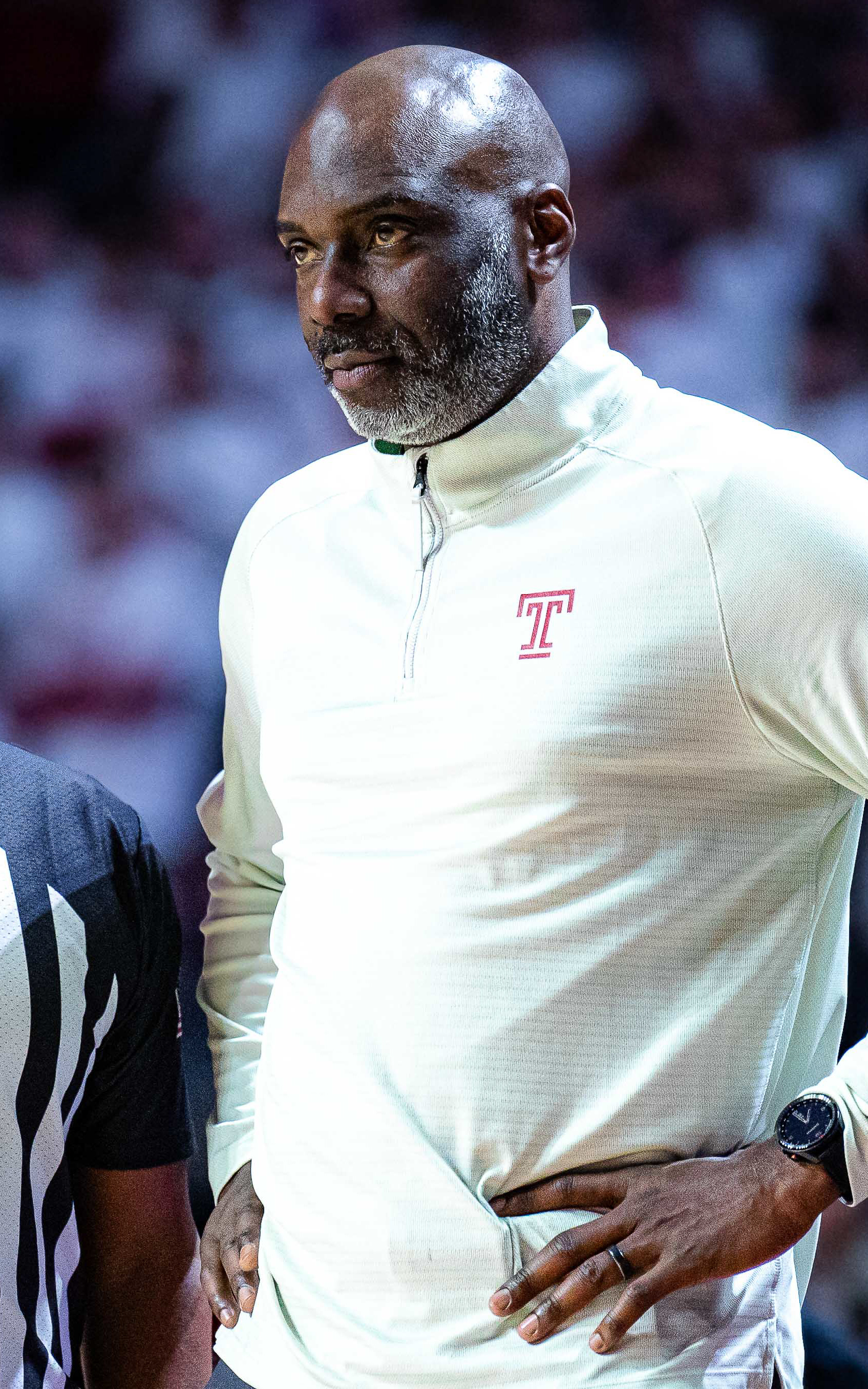
Aaron McKie, Temple, 1993

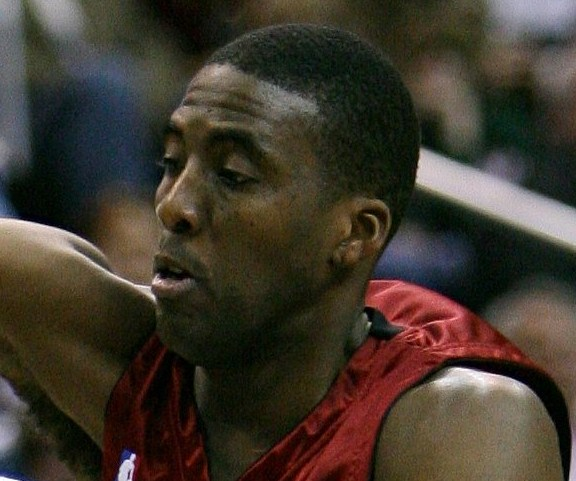
Eddie Jones, Temple, 1994

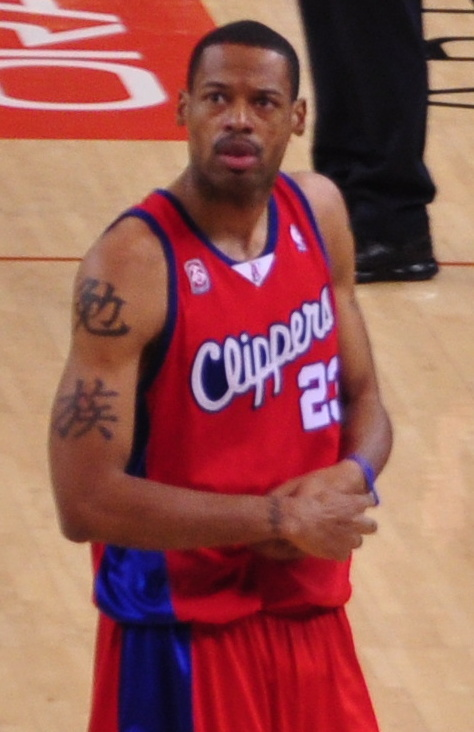
Marcus Camby, UMass, 1996

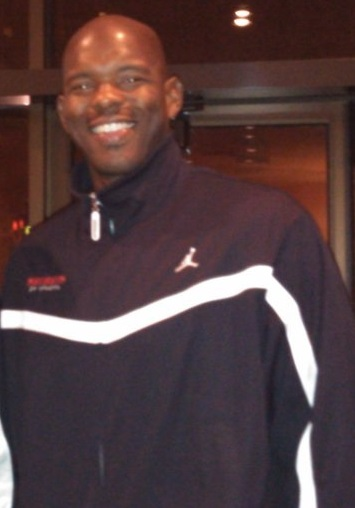
Marc Jackson, Temple, 1997

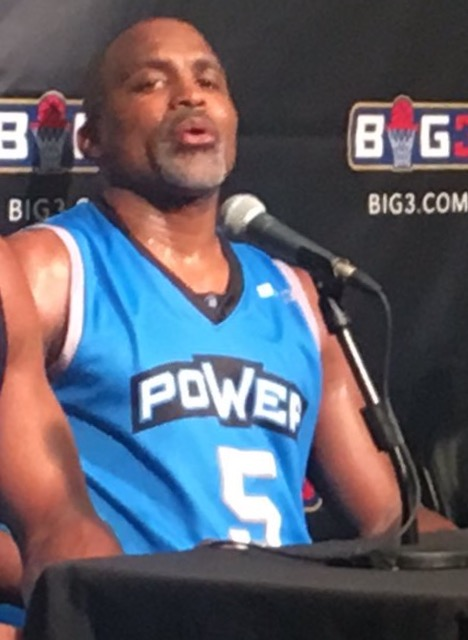
Cuttino Mobley, Rhode Island, 1998

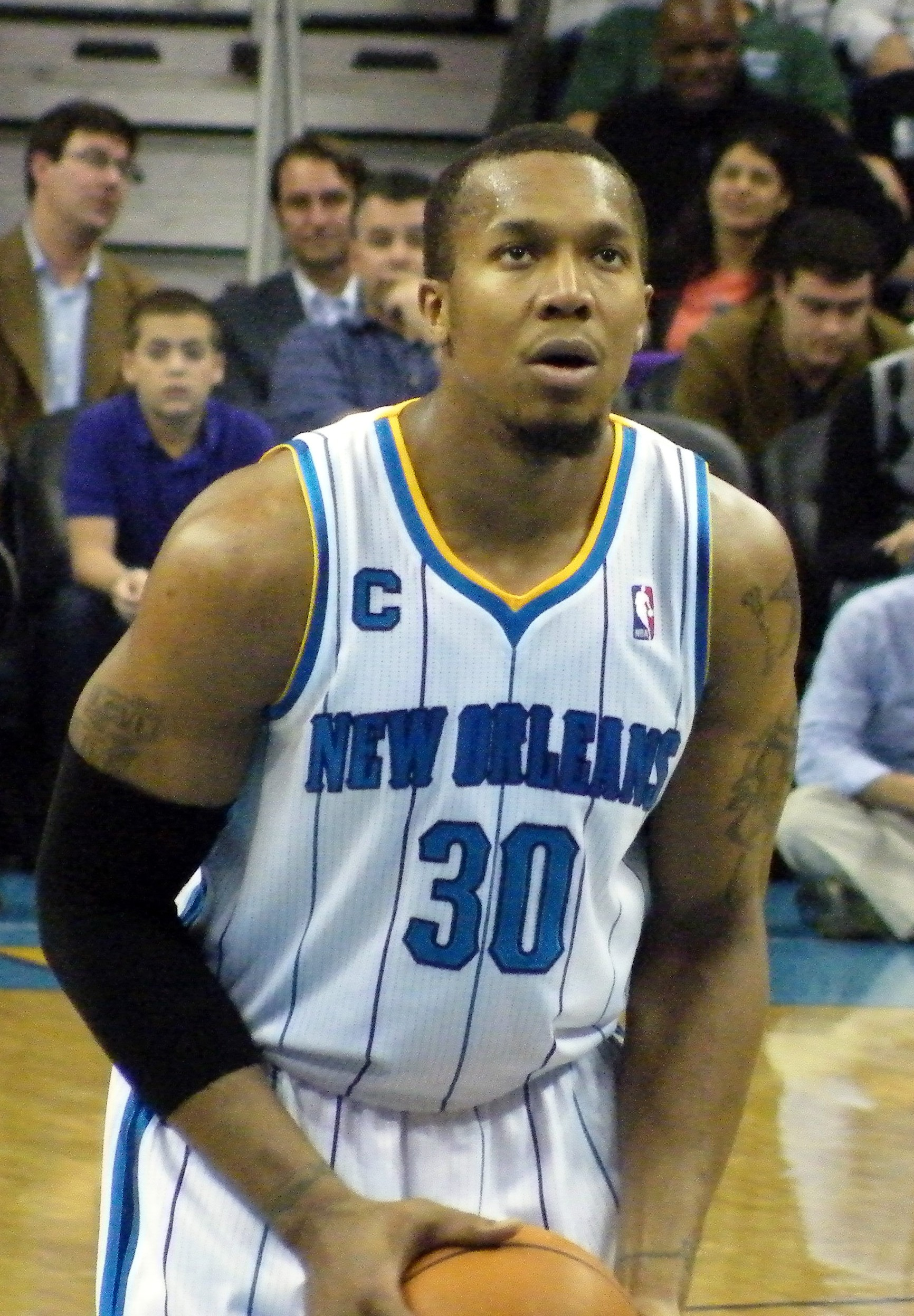
David West, Xavier, 2001 through 2003

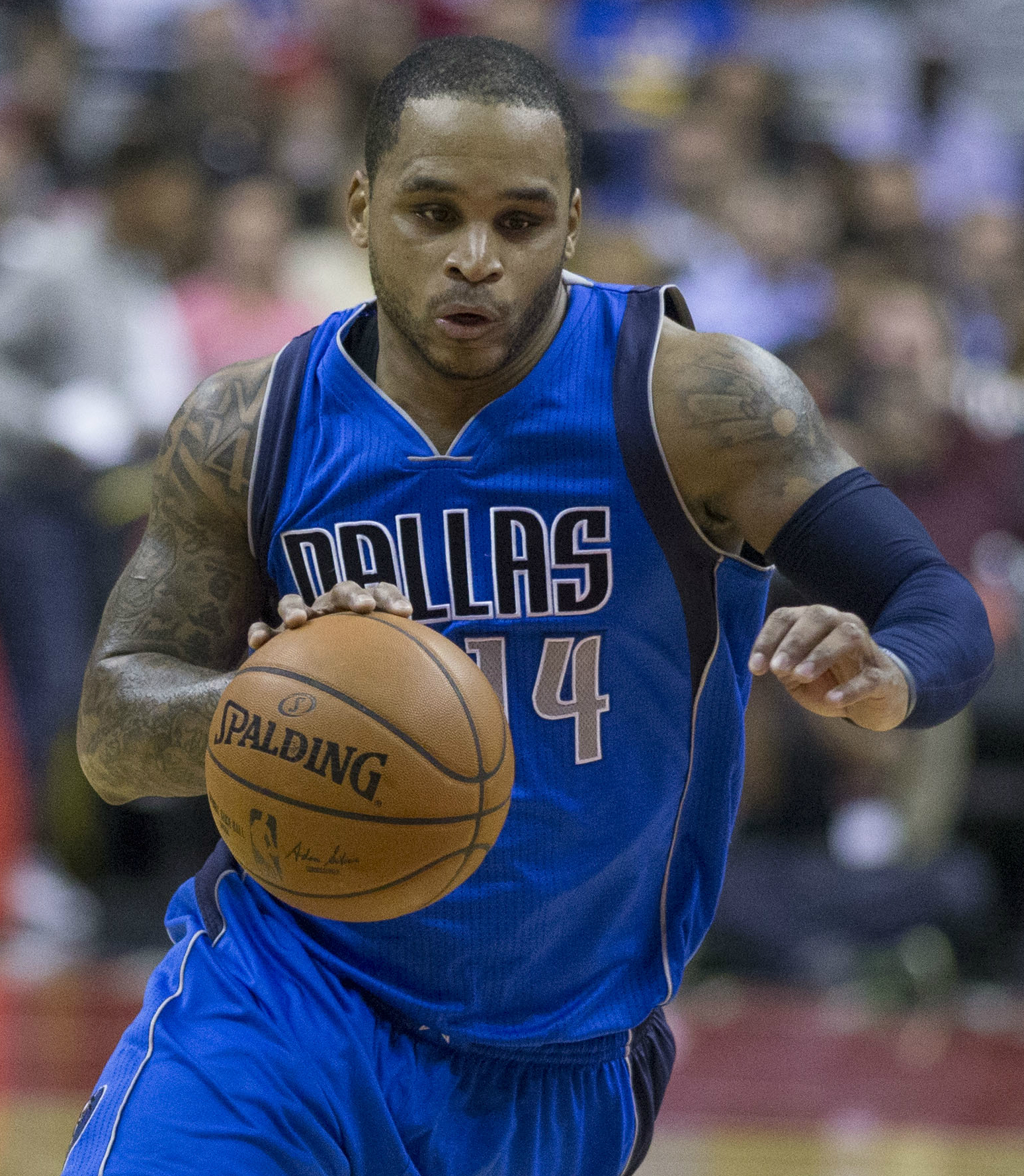
Jameer Nelson, Saint Joseph's, 2004

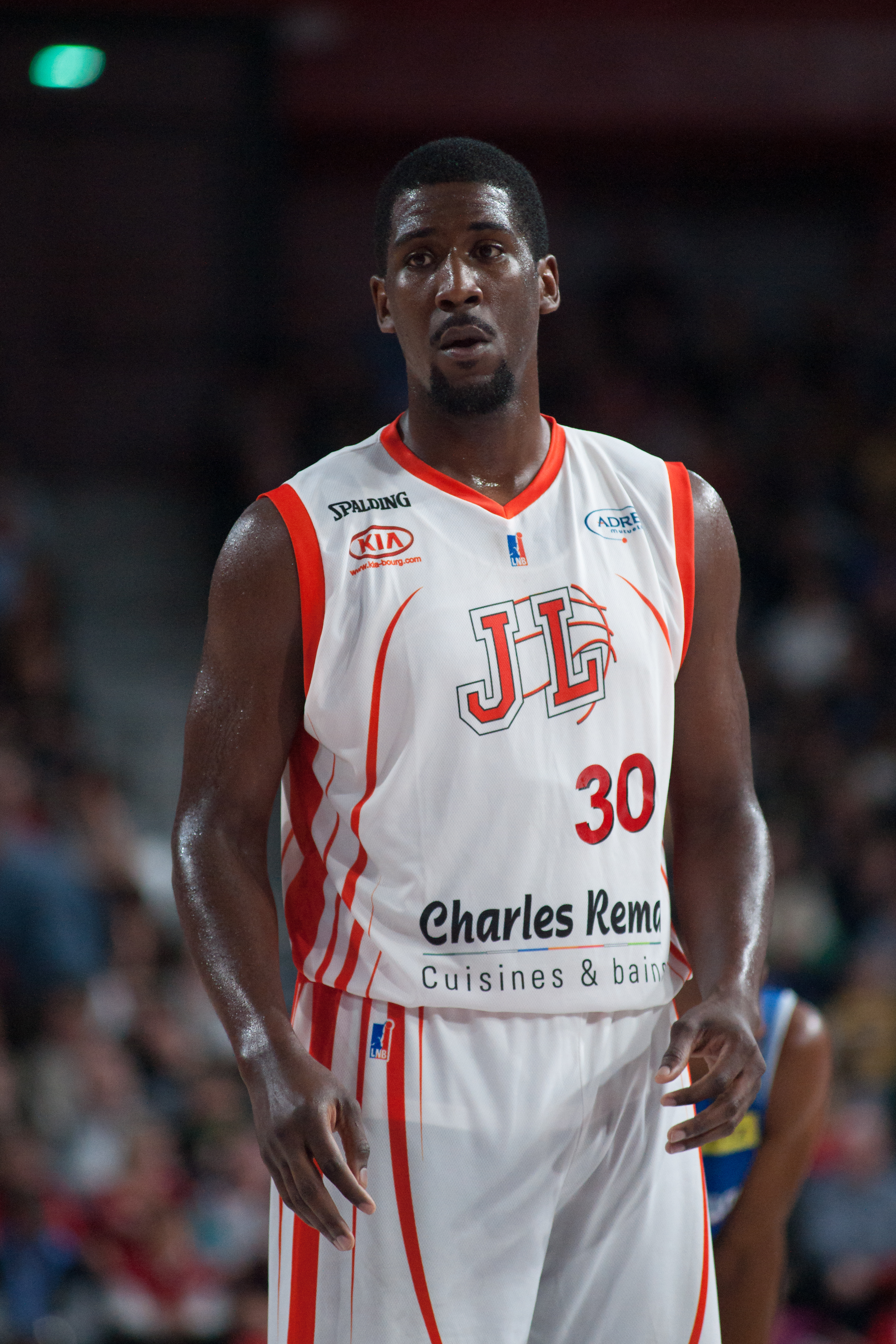
Steven Smith, La Salle, 2005 and 2005

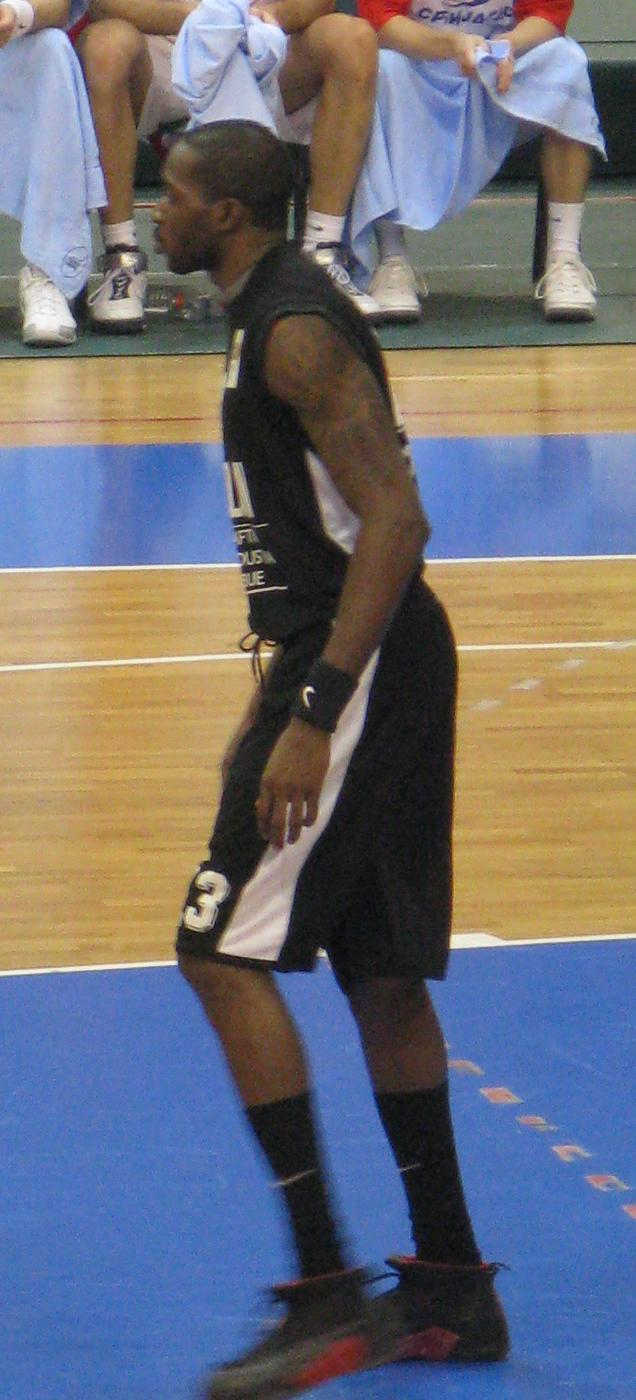
Stéphane Lasme, UMass, 2007

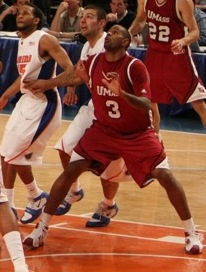
Gary Forbes, UMass, 2008

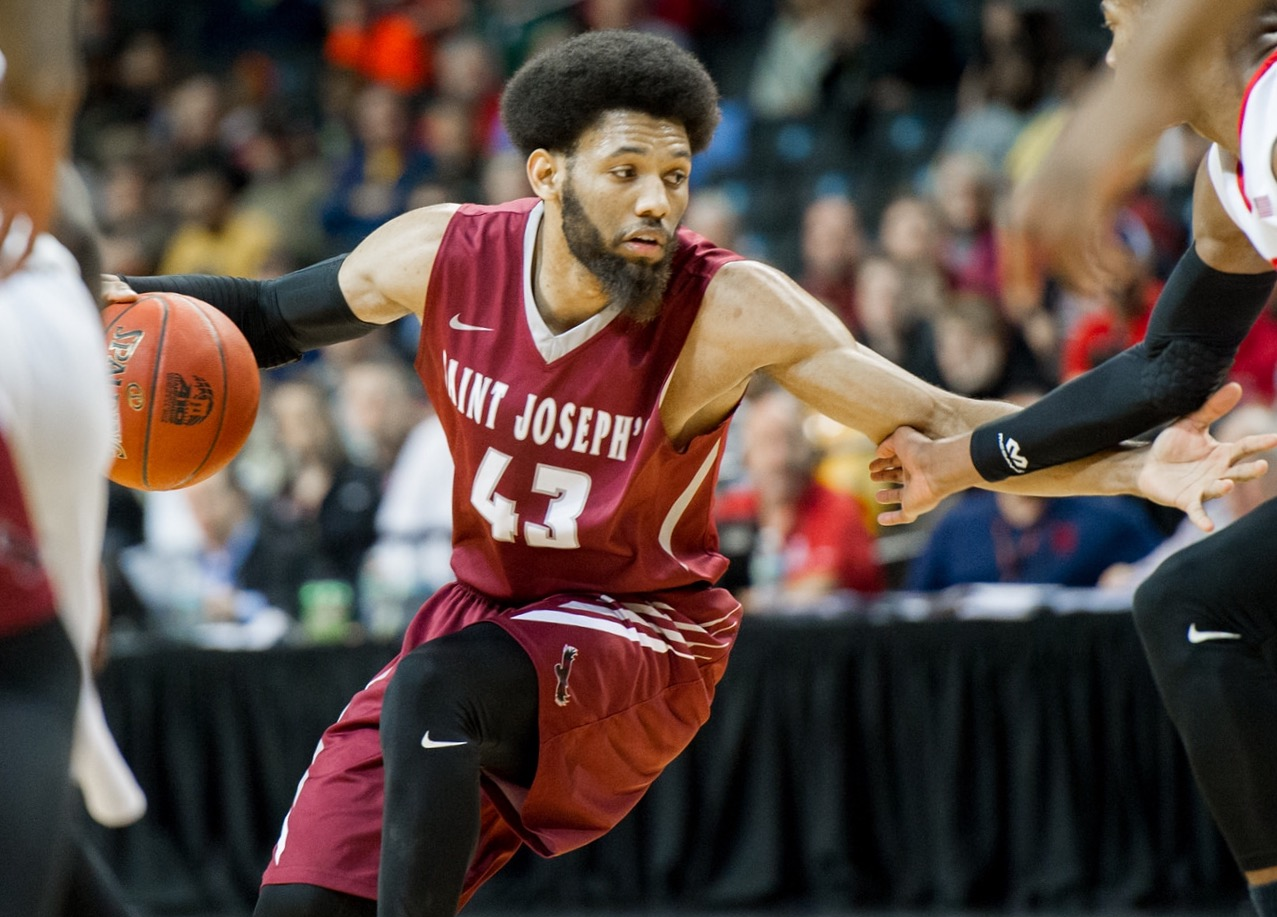
DeAndre' Bembry, Saint Joseph's, 2016

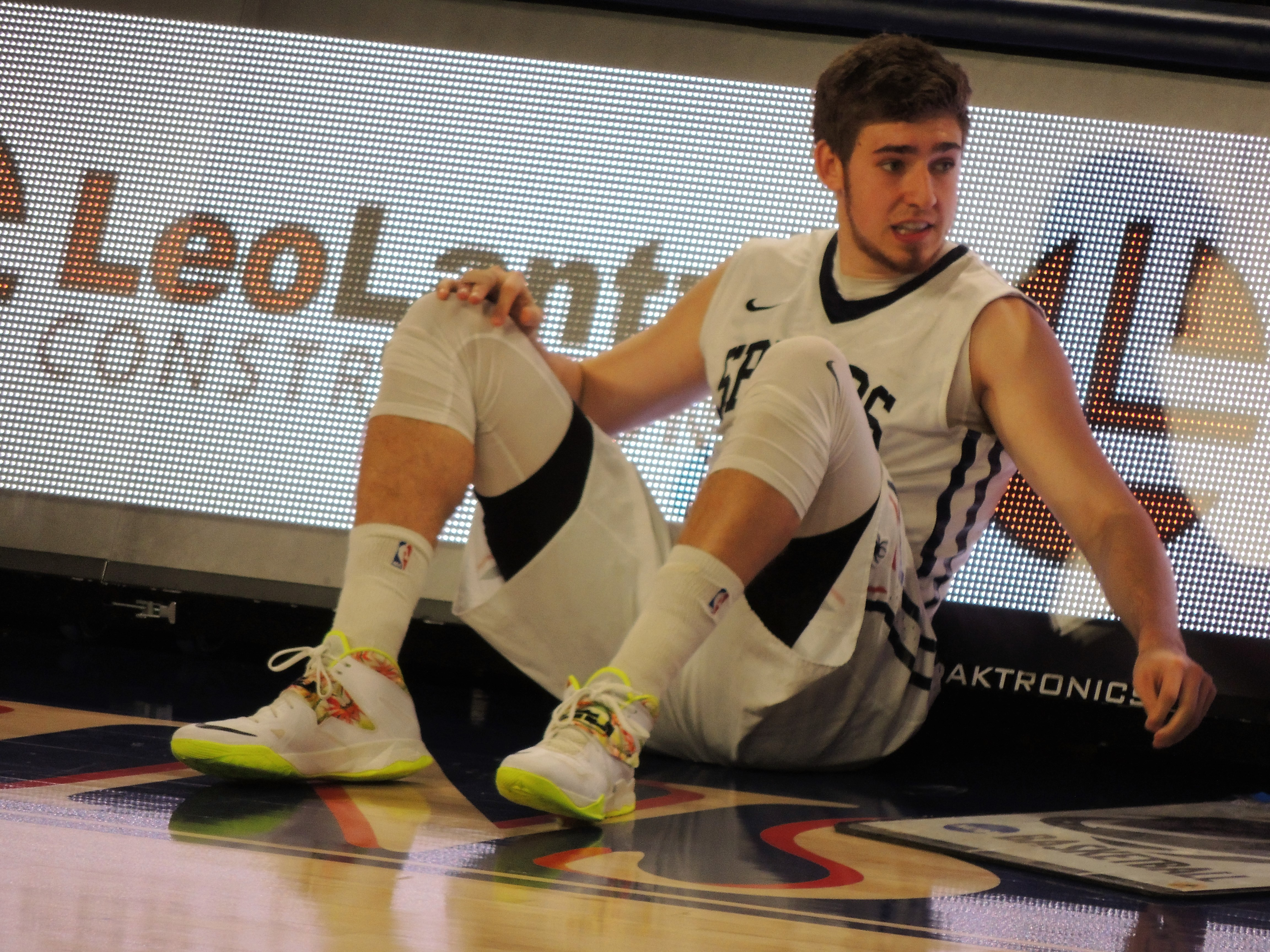
T. J. Cline, Richmond, 2017

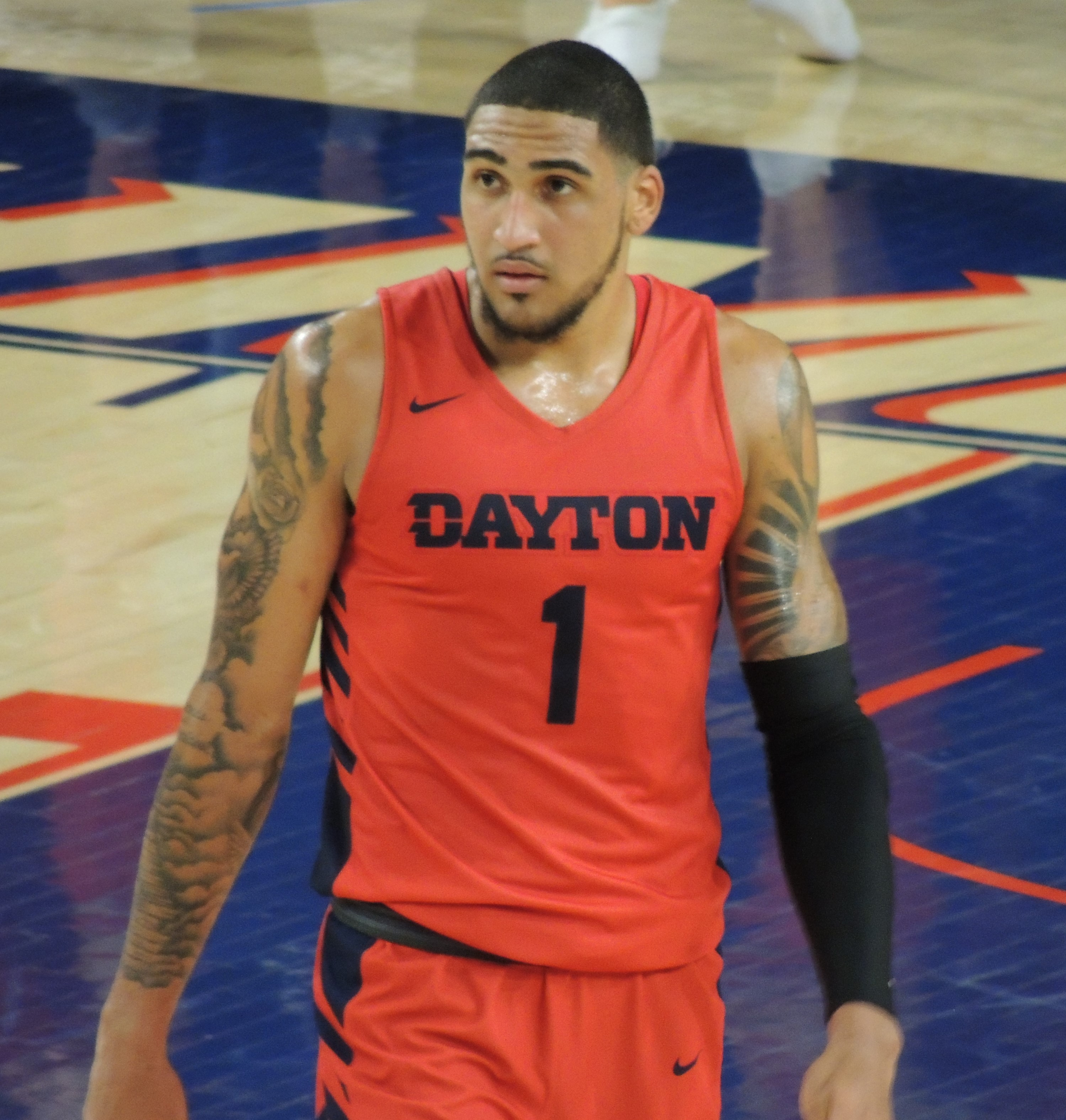
Obi Toppin, Dayton, 2020

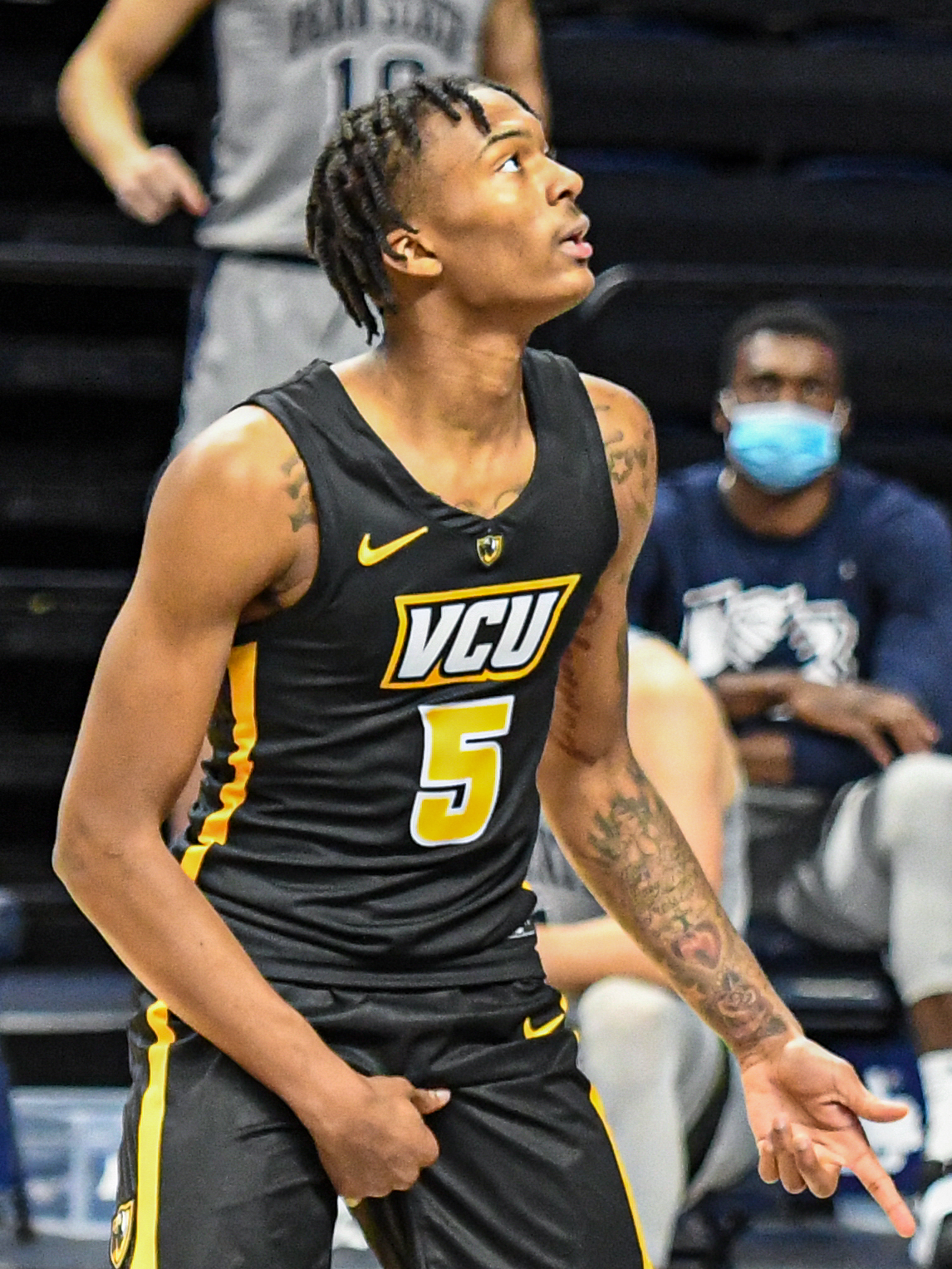
Bones Hyland, VCU, 2021

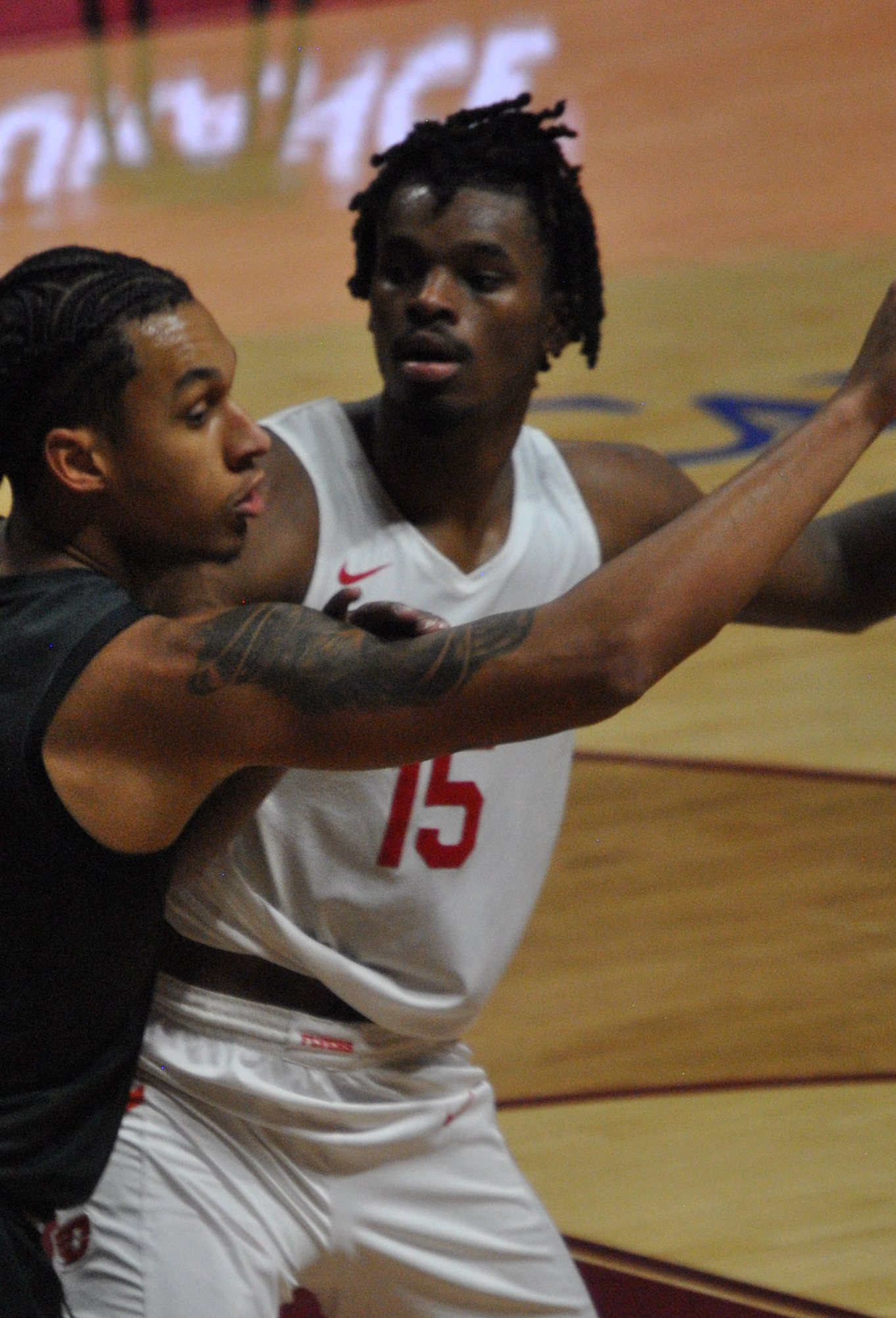
DaRon Holmes II, Dayton, 2024

Season	Player	School	Position	Class	Reference
1976–77	Norm Nixon	Duquesne	PG	Senior	
1977–78	James Bailey	Rutgers	F / C	Junior	
1978–79	James Bailey (2)	Rutgers	F / C	Senior	
1979–80	Earl Belcher	St. Bonaventure	F	Junior	
1980–81	Earl Belcher (2)	St. Bonaventure	F	Senior	
1981–82	Greg Jones	West Virginia	PG	Junior	
1982–83^{†}	Roy Hinson	Rutgers	C	Senior	
1982–83^{†}	Greg Jones (2)	West Virginia	PG	Senior	
1983–84	Terence Stansbury	Temple	SG	Senior	
1984–85	Granger Hall	Temple	C	Senior	
1985–86	Maurice Martin	Saint Joseph's	SF / SG	Senior	
1986–87	Nate Blackwell	Temple	G	Senior	
1987–88	Tim Perry	Temple	PF	Senior	
1988–89	Mark Macon	Temple	SG	Sophomore	
1989–90	Kenny Green	Rhode Island	C	Senior	
1990–91	Keith Hughes	Rutgers	PF	Senior	
1991–92	Harper Williams	UMass	PF / C	Junior	
1992–93	Aaron McKie	Temple	PG / SG	Junior	
1993–94	Eddie Jones	Temple	SG	Senior	
1994–95	Lou Roe	UMass	F	Senior	
1995–96	Marcus Camby*	UMass	C	Junior	
1996–97	Marc Jackson	Temple	C	Senior	
1997–98	Cuttino Mobley	Rhode Island	PG / SG	Senior	
1998–99	Shawnta Rogers	George Washington	PG	Senior	
1999–00	Pepe Sánchez	Temple	PG	Senior	
2000–01	David West	Xavier	PF	Sophomore	
2001–02	David West (2)	Xavier	PF	Junior	
2002–03	David West (3)	Xavier	PF	Senior	
2003–04	Jameer Nelson*	Saint Joseph's	PG	Senior	
2004–05^{†}	Pat Carroll	Saint Joseph's	SG	Senior	
2004–05^{†}	Steven Smith	La Salle	SF	Junior	
2005–06	Steven Smith (2)	La Salle	SF	Senior	
2006–07	Stéphane Lasme	UMass	PF	Senior	
2007–08	Gary Forbes	UMass	SF / SG	Senior	
2008–09	Ahmad Nivins	Saint Joseph's	PF / C	Senior	
2009–10	Kevin Anderson	Richmond	PG	Junior	
2010–11	Tu Holloway	Xavier	PG	Junior	
2011–12	Andrew Nicholson	St. Bonaventure	PF	Senior	
2012–13	Khalif Wyatt	Temple	SG	Senior	
2013–14	Jordair Jett	Saint Louis	SG	Senior	
2014–15	Tyler Kalinoski	Davidson	PG	Senior	
2015–16	DeAndre' Bembry	Saint Joseph's	F	Junior	
2016–17	T. J. Cline	Richmond	F / C	Senior	
2017–18^{†}	Jaylen Adams	St. Bonaventure	PG	Senior	
2017–18^{†}	Peyton Aldridge	Davidson	SF	Senior	
2018–19	Jón Axel Guðmundsson (Note: The 2018–19 award winner is properly referred to as Jón Axel. He is a native of Iceland, in which the standard naming system does not include family names, instead using one or more given names followed by a patronymic (as in his case) or sometimes a matronymic.)	Davidson	G	Junior	
2019–20	Obi Toppin*	Dayton	F	Sophomore	
2020–21	Bones Hyland	VCU	G	Sophomore	
2021–22	Luka Brajkovic	Davidson	PF	Senior	
2022–23	Ace Baldwin Jr.	VCU	PG	Junior	
2023–24^{†}	DaRon Holmes II	Dayton	PF	Junior	
2023–24^{†}	Jordan King	Richmond	PG	Graduate	
2024–25	Max Shulga	VCU	PG / SG	Graduate	
2025–26	Robbie Avila	Saint Louis	C	Senior	

== Winners by school ==
School (years in conference)	Winners	Years
Temple (1982–2013) (Note: Temple University left in 2013 to join what is now the American Conference.)	10	1984, 1985, 1987, 1988, 1989, 1993, 1994, 1997, 2000, 2013
Saint Joseph's (1982–present)	5	1986, 2004, 2005^{†}, 2009, 2016
UMass (1976–2025) (Note: The University of Massachusetts Amherst, known for sports purposes interchangeably as UMass and Massachusetts, left the A-10 in 2025 for the Mid-American Conference.)	5	1992, 1995, 1996, 2007, 2008
Davidson (2014–present)	4	2015, 2018^{†}, 2019, 2022
Rutgers (1976–1995) (Note: Rutgers University and West Virginia University left in 1995 to join their football teams in the original Big East. Rutgers remained in the American in the 2013–14 season before leaving for the Big Ten Conference. West Virginia left in 2012 to join the Big 12 Conference.)	4	1978, 1979, 1983^{†}, 1991
St. Bonaventure (1979–present)	4	1980, 1981, 2012, 2018^{†}
Xavier (1995–2013) (Note: Xavier University and Butler University left in July 2013 to join the current Big East Conference, the latter after only one season in the A-10.)	4	2001, 2002, 2003, 2011
Richmond (2001–present)	3	2010, 2017, 2024^{†}
VCU (2012–present)	3	2021, 2023, 2025
Dayton (1995–present)	2	2020, 2024^{†}
La Salle (1995–present)	2	2005^{†}, 2006
Rhode Island (1980–present)	2	1990, 1998
Saint Louis (2005–present)	2	2014, 2026
West Virginia (1976–1995)	2	1982, 1983
Duquesne (1976–1992, 1993–present) (Note: Duquesne University left the A–10 for the Midwestern Collegiate Conference during the 1992–93 academic year, but returned the following season.)	1	1977
George Washington (1976–present)	1	1999
Butler (2012–13)	0	—
Charlotte (2005–2013) (Note: The University of North Carolina at Charlotte, known for sports purposes as Charlotte, left in 2013 for Conference USA, and moved to the American in 2023.)	0	—
Fordham (1995–present)	0	—
George Mason (2013–present)	0	—
Loyola Chicago (2022–present)	0	—
