= Greg Jones (basketball) =

American basketball player (born 1961)

Personal information
- Born: March 3, 1961 (age 65) Youngstown, Ohio, U.S.
- Listed height: 6 ft 2 in (1.88 m)
- Listed weight: 190 lb (86 kg)

Career information
- High school: Rayen (Youngstown, Ohio)
- College: West Virginia (1979–1983)
- NBA draft: 1983: 3rd round, 49th overall pick
- Drafted by: Indiana Pacers
- Position: Point guard / shooting guard

Career history
- 1983–1984: Wisconsin Flyers
- 1984–1986: Evansville Thunder
- 1986–1987: Wisconsin Flyers
- 1987–1988: Quad City Thunder
- 1988: Youngstown Pride

Career highlights
- CBA Rookie of the Year (1984); 2× Atlantic 10 Player of the Year (1982, 1983); 3× First-team All-Atlantic 10 (1981–1983)
- Stats at Basketball Reference

Gregory Jones (born March 3, 1961) is an American retired basketball player. He was an All-American player at West Virginia University and later Rookie of the Year in the Continental Basketball Association (CBA).

== College career ==
Jones, a 6'2" guard from Youngstown, Ohio, played collegiate basketball at West Virginia. He was a three-year starter for the Mountaineers, leading them to three straight 20-win seasons and consecutive NCAA Tournament appearances in 1982 and 1983.

For his career, Jones scored 1,793 points. He was a three-time first team All-Atlantic 10 Conference choice (Eastern 8 Conference before the 1982–83 season) and was twice named conference Player of the Year in 1982 and 1983. He was also named an honorable mention All-American by the Associated Press both seasons. His senior year, Jones averaged 22.3 points per game, including 32 in an upset of then-#1 UNLV.

== Professional career ==
Following the close of Jones' college career, he was selected by the Indiana Pacers in the 3rd round of the 1983 NBA draft. He did not make the team, instead signing with the Wisconsin Flyers of the CBA. Jones averaged 18.3 points and 3.9 assists per game for the Flyers and was named the 1984 CBA Rookie of the Year. Jones played in the CBA for several more seasons, for the Evansville Thunder and Quad City Thunder. He was named a CBA All-Star in 1984 and 1985. He also played for the Youngstown Pride of the World Basketball League.
