= Vince Hamilton =

Australian rules footballer, born 1916

Personal information
- Full name: Vince Hamilton
- Born: 1 March 1916
- Died: 22 March 1989 (aged 73)

Playing career^{1}
Years	Club	Games (Goals)
1935	Footscray	6 (2)
- ^{1} Playing statistics correct to the end of 1935.

Vince Hamilton (1 March 1916 – 22 March 1989) was an Australian rules footballer who played with Footscray in the Victorian Football League (VFL).
