= Cincinnati Slammers =

- Division: Central (1982–83); Western (1983–87)
- Founded: 1982
- Dissolved: 1987
- History: Ohio Mixers; 1982–1984; Cincinnati Slammers 1984–1987; Cedar Rapids Silver Bullets; 1988–1991; Tri-City Chinook; 1991–1995
- Arena: Lima Senior High School (1982–84); Cincinnati Gardens (1984–87)
- Location: Lima, Ohio (1982–84); Cincinnati, Ohio (1984–87)
- Team colors: red, yellow, black (1982–84) navy, white, silver (1984–86) magenta, orange, white (1986–87)
- Ownership: Sawyer family (1982–87); Jerry Robinson (1984–86); Jerry Gordon (1986–87)

The Cincinnati Slammers, originally the Ohio Mixers, were a professional basketball team based in Lima, Ohio from 1982 to 1984 and Cincinnati, Ohio from 1984 to 1987. They were members of the Continental Basketball Association (CBA). The team was admitted into the CBA as an expansion franchise in 1982. Team owner Tom Sawyer served as the Mixers' head coach during their two season. Jerry Robinson underwrote the re-location of the franchise to Cincinnati before the 1984–85 season. Sawyer stayed on as head coach to the newly re-branded Cincinnati Slammers, but resigned during their first season at which point assistant coach Tom Thacker took over the position. Herb Brown was hired as head coach before the 1985–86 season and led the team until they went defunct following the 1986–87 season.

== History ==
=== Lima (1982–84) ===
The Continental Basketball Association (CBA) admitted an expansion franchise from Lima, Ohio on May 28, 1982, just before the CBA franchise fee increased from $100,000 to $125,000. They were designated to the Central Division of the CBA. They were branded as the Ohio Mixers.

The Mixers played their first game on December 3, 1982. Ohio's Center Rich Kelley was their first player in franchise history to get signed to a National Basketball Association (NBA) contract when he signed a 10-day deal on December 28, 1982, with the Denver Nuggets. Kelly went on to play the rest of the season with in the NBA, eventually joining the Utah Jazz after Denver traded him for Danny Schayes and cash considerations. On December 31, 1982, Mixers' guard Dwight Anderson was signed to a 10-day contract with Denver, but the deal was not extended so he returned to Lima on January 9, 1983.

Phil Jackson, who was later inducted into the Naismith Memorial Basketball Hall of Fame as a head coach, made his professional head coaching debut against the Mixers on January 30, 1983, after the Albany Patroons fired Dean Meminger and Jackson was hired to take his place.

On February 9, 1983, Ohio guard Kevin Figaro was named to the '83 CBA All-Star First Team. Ohio finished the 1982–83 CBA season with a win–loss record of 17–27.

During the off-season in 1983 the Mixers traded power forward DeWayne Scales to the Detroit Spirits in exchange for center Cyrus Mann. It was reported in the Lexington Herald-Leader that the Mixers had a cooperative working agreement to develop players for the Atlanta Hawks and San Antonio Spurs of the NBA, essentially acting their farm team.

The 1983–84 Mixers featured NBA players Wes Matthews and Billy Ray Bates. Matthews was called up to the NBA twice that season, first with the Atlanta Hawks and finally with the Philadelphia 76ers. Bates was attempting an NBA comeback, which on top of joining the Mixers included playing for Crispa Redmanizers of the Philippine Basketball Association. Although Bates never made it back on an NBA roster, he did play professional basketball until 1988. At the end of the season, their record was 23–21, which wasn't good enough to make the CBA post-season.

During their two seasons in Lima, the Mixers played their home games at Lima Senior High School, which had a capacity for 3,800 persons.

=== Cincinnati (1984–87) ===
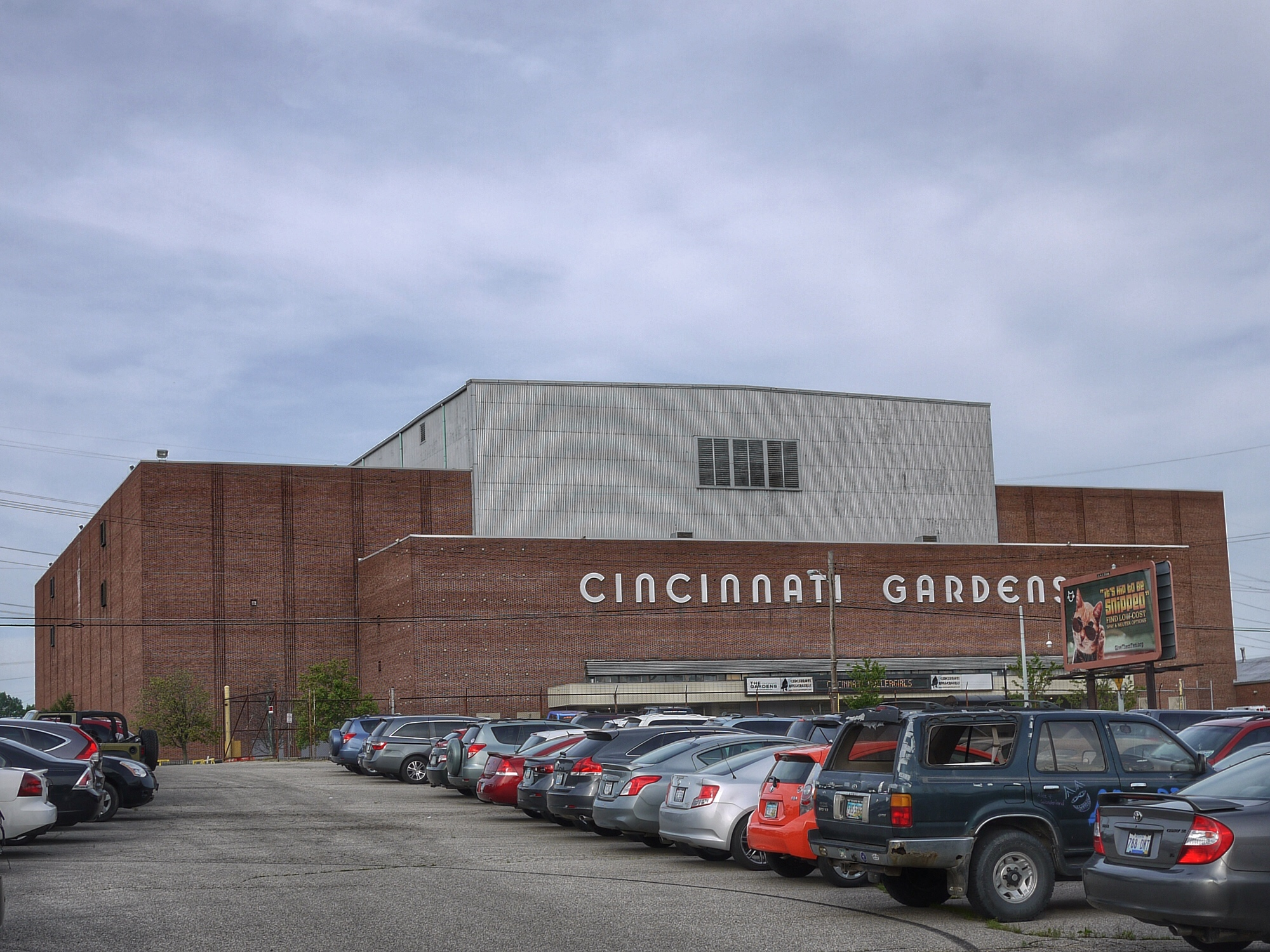
The Cincinnati Gardens (pictured) was the home venue of the Slammers from 1984 to 1987.

During the off-season before the 1984–85 season, the CBA approved the relocation of the Mixers from Lima, Ohio to Cincinnati. The Sawyer family of Lima, who owned the Ohio Mixers, had their re-location costs underwritten by Jerry Robinson, the president of the Cincinnati Gardens where the newly branded Cincinnati Slammers would play. It was the first professional basketball team in that city since the Cincinnati Royals re-located to Kansas City, Missouri.

The first player Cincinnati signed was former University of Dayton swingman Roosevelt Chapman when he inked a contract on October 16, 1984. When asked by the United Press International how it felt to be close to his alma mater, Chapman responded, "It feels good [...] I'll be close to home and there will be a lot of [NBA] scouts here watching us."

The Slammers recorded their first win of the season against the Louisville Catbirds, by a score of 111–90. Cincinnati center Dewayne Scales scored a game-high 29 points and 13 rebounds, followed by Slammers player Darrell Gadsden who scored 26 points. Head coach Tom Sawyer resigned his position in early January 1985. Tom Thacker, who had been Cincinnati's assistant coach, was given the head coaching position following Sawyers resignation.

Cincinnati's finished their first season with the worst record in the league (17–31), although based on the league's point system they were second to last (135 points).

In June 1985 the Slammers hired Linda Reed as their general manager. That marked the first time a woman had been hired as general manager to a professional basketball team. Reed offered Herb Brown the Slammers' head coaching position for the 1985–86 season. The season before Brown had coached the Puerto Rico Coquis where he received a $500 fine for an altercation with a CBA referee. Tom Thacker, who had been the team's head coach since Tom Sawyer resigned in January 1985, stayed with Cincinnati as an assistant coach to Brown.

Slammers' head coach Herb Brown was named CBA Coach of the Month for January 1986. Cincinnati player Victor Fleming was selected to the 1986 CBA All-Star Team. The Slammers finished the 1985–86 season with the best record in the Western Division (33–15). They also finished first in their division in points, which the CBA uses to determine their postseason seeding.

During the first round of the 1986 CBA Playoffs the Slammers faced the Kansas City Sizzlers. Cincinnati swept Kansas City four games to none. The Slammers went on the 1986 CBA Western Division Semifinals where they played the Evansville Thunder. The Thunder managed to win one game in that series, but the Slammers were victorious in four games advancing them to the 1986 Western Division Finals. The La Crosse Catbirds advanced the 1986 CBA Finals over Cincinnati after winning four games of the series to the Slammers' two games.

In spite of their success during the 1985–86 season, Slammers' part-owner Jerry Robinson announced he was selling his interest in the Cincinnati CBA franchise. According to Robinson, the Slammers had lost $500,000 during their two seasons in Cincinnati. He also stated that the average attendance for home games was 940 spectators. During the playoffs, the Slammers could only muster 1,500 persons on average. Their small crowds did not deter the team from signing a contract with their home venue, Cincinnati Gardens, for the 1986–87 season.

During a game on February 13, 1987, Cincinnati player Bill Martin knocked Charleston Gunners center Peter Verhoeven unconscious during a fight in the third quarter. Martin was suspended three games.

=== Hiatus and re-location to Cedar Rapids (1987–88) ===
Team owner Jerry Gordon, who purchased Jerry Robinson's interest in the Slammers, denied reports that the franchise was looking to relocate to Fort Wayne, Indiana following the 1986–87 season. Gordon did say that there was still the possibility the Slammers could be re-located, just not to Fort Wayne. Several days later, Gordon backtracked on his previous statement admitting that the Slammers were looking to relocate to Fort Wayne. Cincinnati had the second lowest attendance during the 1986–87 season, averaging 705 spectators per game.

Going into the 1987–88 season the CBA shifted their focus away from big markets (like Cincinnati) to smaller ones. Slammers owner Jerry Gordon was given a year to find a small market buyer who could re-locate before the 1988–89 season. Gordon looked at Canton, Ohio as a possible new home for the Slammers, but he found little interest from potential buyers and city officials.

Krause Gentle, owner of the convenience store chain Kum & Go, approached Slammers owner Jerry Gordon about buying the franchise and re-locating it to Cedar Rapids, Iowa. The deal was approved by the CBA and the team was re-branded as the Cedar Rapids Silver Bullets before the 1988–89 season.

== Season-by-season standings ==
Season	W	L	Win%	QW	SPts.	Division	Place	CBA Playoffs	Head coach
Ohio Mixers (Lima, Ohio)
1982–83	17	27	.386	81.5	132.5	Central	2^{nd}	—	John Nillen
1983–84	23	21	.523	88	157	Western	4^{th}	First round: Lost to the Wisconsin Flyers, 3–2	Howard Komives (2–9)
1983–84	23	21	.523	88	157	Western	4^{th}	First round: Lost to the Wisconsin Flyers, 3–2	Tom Sawyer (21–12)
Cincinnati Slammers (Cincinnati, Ohio)
1984–85	17	31	.354	84	135	Western	6^{th}	—	Tom Sawyer (5–9)
1984–85	17	31	.354	84	135	Western	6^{th}	—	Tom Thacker (12–22)
1985–86	33	15	.688	102.5	201.5	Western	1^{st}	First round: Defeated the Kansas City Sizzlers, 4–0	Herb Brown
1985–86	33	15	.688	102.5	201.5	Western	1^{st}	Second round: Defeated the Evansville Thunder, 3–2	Herb Brown
1985–86	33	15	.688	102.5	201.5	Western	1^{st}	CBA Western Division Finals: Lost to the La Crosse Catbirds, 4–2	Herb Brown
1986–87	25	23	.521	108.5	183.5	Western	2^{nd}	First round: Defeated the Topeka Sizzlers, 4–2	Herb Brown
1986–87	25	23	.521	108.5	183.5	Western	2^{nd}	CBA Western Division Finals: Lost to the Rockford Lightning, 4–1	Herb Brown

== All-time roster ==
- Maurice Adams
- Richard Adams
- Norm Anchrum
- Dwight Anderson
- Ken Austin
- Marvin Barnes
- Billy Ray Bates
- Norris Bell
- Tom Bethea
- Lewis Brown
- Johnny Brown
- Tony Brown
- David Burns
- Albert Butts
- John Campbell
- Butch Carter
- Roosevelt Chapman
- Leroy Combs
- Mark Dorris
- Jerry Eaves
- Dan Federmann
- Kevin Figaro
- Scott Fisher
- Victor Fleming
- Alvin Frederick
- Darrell Gadsden
- Lionel Garrett
- Mike Green
- Dino Gregory
- Lamar Heard
- Lawrence Held
- Carl Henry
- Anthony Hicks
- Johnny High
- Doug Jemison
- Jeff Jenkins
- Jim Johnstone
- Ozell Jones
- Mike Kanieski
- Daryl Lloyd
- Nigel Lloyd
- Bill Martin
- Wes Matthews
- Jim McCaffrey
- John McCullough
- Hank McDowell
- Bob Miller
- Brian O'Connor
- John Pinone
- John Schweitz
- Jay Shakir
- Wayne Smith
- Lloyd Terry
- Joel Thompson
- Sedric Toney
- Steve Trumbo
- Horace Wyatt
- John Wiley
- Kevin Williams
- Tony Wilson
- Brad Wright
