= Claude Gregory =

American basketball player

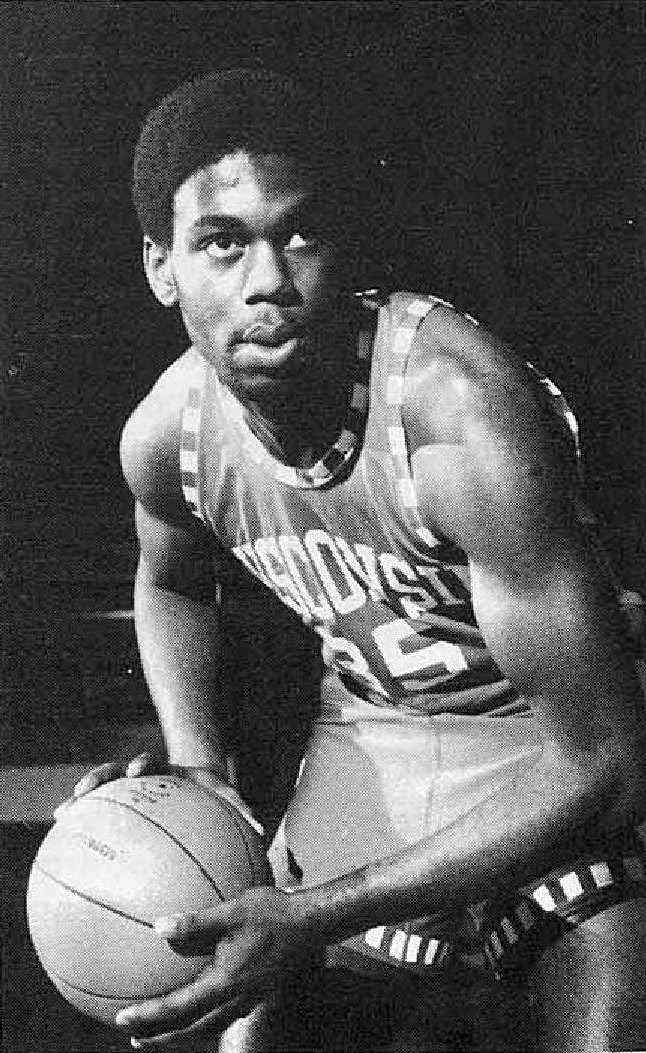
- Gregory in 1977

Personal information
- Born: December 26, 1958 (age 67) Washington, D.C., U.S.
- Listed height: 6 ft 8 in (2.03 m)
- Listed weight: 205 lb (93 kg)

Career information
- High school: Calvin Coolidge (Washington, D.C.)
- College: Wisconsin (1977–1981)
- NBA draft: 1981: 2nd round, 41st overall pick
- Drafted by: Washington Bullets
- Playing career: 1981–1990
- Position: Power forward
- Number: 7, 43

Career history
- 1981–1982: Zaragoza Skol-Helios
- 1982–1983: C.D. Basconia
- 1984–1986: Evansville Thunder
- 1986: Washington Bullets
- 1986: Evansville Thunder
- 1986–1988: La Crosse Catbirds
- 1988: Los Angeles Clippers
- 1988–1989: Pau-Orthez
- 1989: Cantine Riunite Reggio Emilia
- 1990: Dyc Breogán

Career highlights
- CBA All-Star (1988); 2× All-CBA First Team (1987, 1988); All-CBA Second Team (1986); Spanish League Top Scorer (1983)
- Stats at NBA.com
- Stats at Basketball Reference

Claude Andre Gregory (born December 26, 1958) is an American former professional basketball player from Washington, D.C.. He was a 6-foot-8-inch (203 cm), 205-pound (93 kg) power forward.

== College career ==
Gregory played college basketball for the Wisconsin Badgers.

== Professional career ==
Gregory was selected by the Washington Bullets, with the 18th pick in the 2nd round, of the 1981 NBA draft. Gregory played for two National Basketball Association (NBA) teams. He played only two games for the Bullets in the 1985–86 season, and did not return to the league until the 1987–88 season, when he played in 23 contests for the Los Angeles Clippers, averaging 5.8 points and 3.9 rebounds per game.

Gregory played in the Continental Basketball Association (CBA) for the Evansville Thunder and La Crosse Catbirds from 1984 to 1988. He was selected to the All-CBA First Team in 1987 and 1988 and Second Team in 1986. Gregory was a CBA All-Star in 1988.

== Career statistics ==
Legend
GP	Games played	GS	Games started	MPG	Minutes per game
FG%	Field goal percentage	3P%	3-point field goal percentage	FT%	Free throw percentage
RPG	Rebounds per game	APG	Assists per game	SPG	Steals per game
BPG	Blocks per game	PPG	Points per game	**Bold**	Career high

=== NBA ===
==== Regular season ====
Year	Team	GP	GS	MPG	FG%	3P%	FT%	RPG	APG	SPG	BPG	PPG
1985–86	Washington	2	0	1.0	**.500**	–	–	1.0	.0	**.5**	.0	1.0
1987–88	L.A. Clippers	**23**	**2**	**13.6**	.455	.000	**.333**	**4.1**	**.7**	.4	**.6**	**5.8**
Career		25	2	12.6	.456	.000	.333	3.9	.6	.4	.5	5.4
