= Tico Brown =

American basketball player

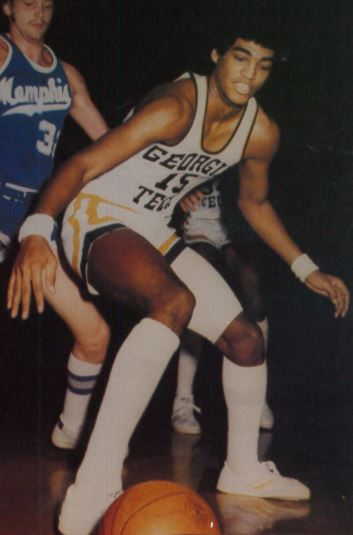
- Brown as a junior at Georgia Tech

Personal information
- Born: July 17, 1957 (age 69) Kokomo, Indiana, U.S.
- Listed height: 6 ft 5 in (1.96 m)
- Listed weight: 180 lb (82 kg)

Career information
- High school: Kokomo (Kokomo, Indiana)
- College: Emmanuel (1975–1976); Georgia Tech (1976–1979)
- NBA draft: 1979: 2nd round, 23rd overall pick
- Drafted by: Utah Jazz
- Playing career: 1979–1988
- Position: Shooting guard

Career history
- 1979–1982: Anchorage Northern Knights
- 1982–1985: Detroit Spirits
- 1986–1988: Savannah Spirits

Career highlights
- 2× CBA champion (1980, 1983); 2× All-CBA First Team (1984, 1987); 2× CBA scoring champion (1984, 1987); CBA 50th Anniversary Team; First-team All-Metro Conference (1977)
- Stats at Basketball Reference

Quautico Moreno Brown (born July 17, 1957) is an American former professional basketball player. He was born in Kokomo, Indiana. At 6'5" tall, and 180-pounds, he played at the shooting guard position.

== College career ==
Brown began his college basketball career in 1975, at Emmanuel College in Franklin Springs, Georgia, before starring at the Georgia Institute of Technology, from 1976 to 1979, averaging 16 points per game over three seasons.

== Professional career ==
Brown was selected by the Utah Jazz, in the second round (23rd pick overall) of the 1979 NBA draft, and spent eight seasons in the Continental Basketball Association (CBA), where he was a member of two championship teams. Brown was selected to the All-CBA First Team in 1984 and 1987 and was the CBA Playoff/Finals Most Valuable Player in 1983. He retired in 1988, as the league's all-time leading scorer (with 8,538 points), and was voted to the All-Time CBA Team. He also played overseas in Switzerland, Venezuela, and Belgium.

A prolific scorer, Brown scored 53 points in a February 1987 game, while playing for the CBA's Savannah (Ga.) Spirits. He also logged a 52-point game 11 days earlier, and had a 51-point game in December 1986. In a double-overtime game on March 30, 1983, during the CBA Championship Series, Brown scored 60 points, to help the Detroit Spirits down the Montana Golden Nuggets, 136–128. His team went on to win the best-of-seven championship, 4 games to 3.

== Post-playing career ==
In October 2007, Brown was inducted into the Howard (Indiana) County Sports Hall of Fame.

== Personal ==
One of Tico's sons, Rion, played for the University of Miami men's basketball team, from 2010 to 2014.
