= Robert Smith (basketball) =

American basketball player (born 1955)

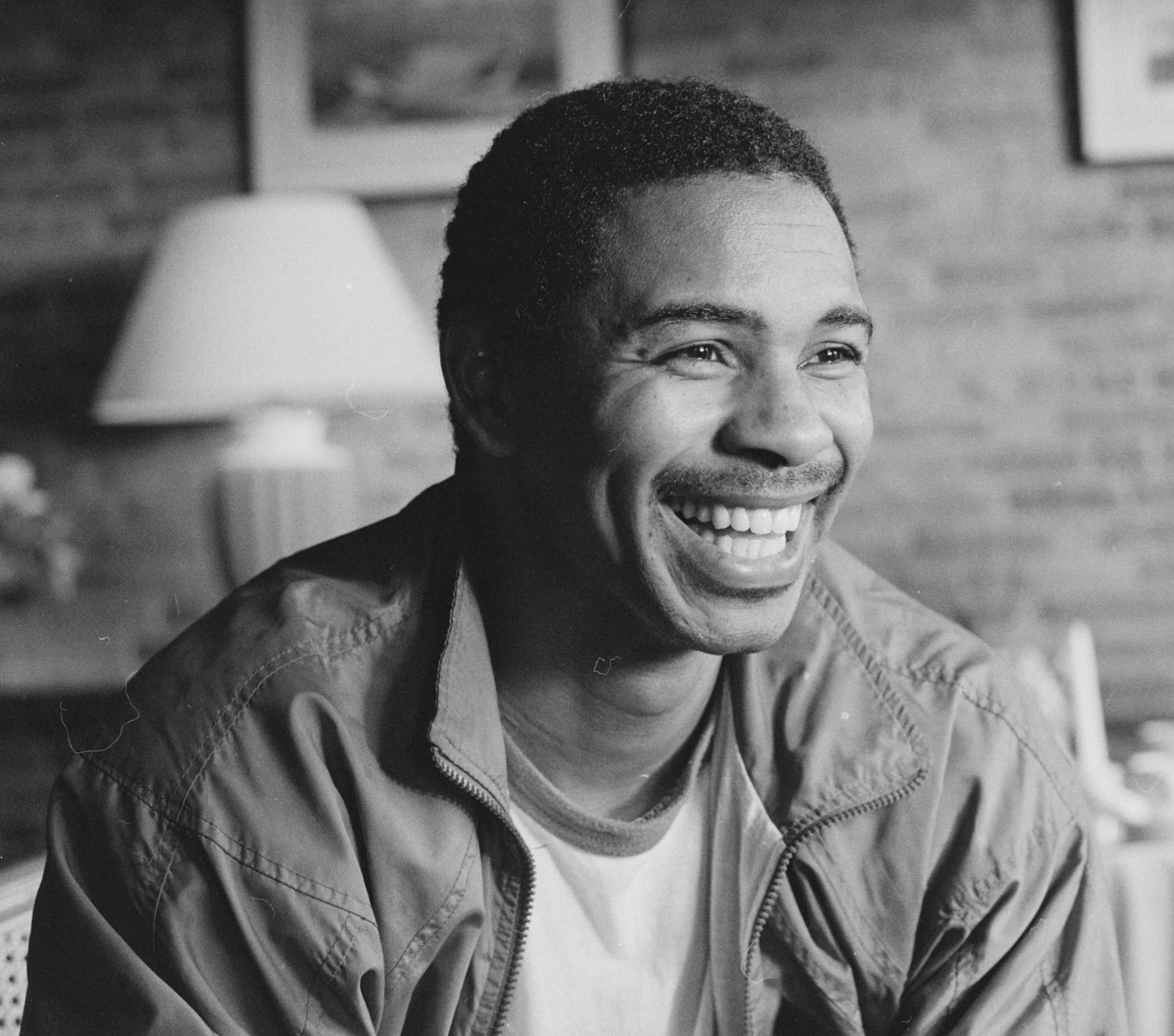
- Smith in 1990

Personal information
- Born: March 10, 1955 (age 71) Los Angeles, California, U.S.
- Listed height: 5 ft 11 in (1.80 m)
- Listed weight: 165 lb (75 kg)

Career information
- High school: Crenshaw (Los Angeles, California)
- College: Arizona Western (1973–1974); UNLV (1974–1977)
- NBA draft: 1977: 3rd round, 65th overall pick
- Drafted by: Denver Nuggets
- Playing career: 1977–1992
- Position: Point guard
- Number: 5, 10, 9

Career history
- 1977–1979: Denver Nuggets
- 1979: Utah Jazz
- 1979–1980: New Jersey Nets
- 1980: Cleveland Cavaliers
- 1981–1982: Montana Golden Nuggets
- 1982: Milwaukee Bucks
- 1982: San Diego Clippers
- 1982–1983: Montana Golden Nuggets
- 1983: San Antonio Spurs
- 1983–1984: Toronto Tornados
- 1984: Cleveland Cavaliers
- 1984–1985: Toronto Tornados
- 1985–1989: AS Monaco
- 1989–1992: Olympique Antibes

Career highlights
- French League champion (1991); 2× French League All-Star Game MVP (1987, 1990); French League All-Star (1987–1990); CBA Most Valuable Player (1983); 3× All-CBA First Team (1983–1985); All-CBA Second Team (1982); CBA All-Defensive Second Team (1985); CBA assists leader (1983); No. 2 retired by UNLV Runnin' Rebels

Career NBA statistics
- Points: 1,135 (5 ppg)
- Assists: 401 (1.8 apg)
- Steals: 119 (0.5 spg)
- Stats at NBA.com
- Stats at Basketball Reference

Robert Leroy Smith (born March 10, 1955) is an American former professional basketball player in the National Basketball Association (NBA). He played college basketball for the UNLV Runnin' Rebels.

== College career ==
A 5'11" tall point guard, Smith played college basketball at the University of Nevada, Las Vegas, where as a member of the fabled "Hardway Eight", that was coached by the legendary Jerry Tarkanian, and that took the Runnin' Rebels to their first NCAA Final Four, in 1977. His jersey was honored by UNLV in 2022.

== Professional career ==
Smith was selected by the Denver Nuggets, in the third round of the 1977 NBA draft, with the 65th overall draft pick. Smith played for seven NBA teams, in as many seasons from, 1977 to 1984. On November 17, 1978, while he was playing with the Denver Nuggets, Smith scored a career-high 19 points, in a game against the Boston Celtics.

In October 1979, Smith was traded by the Denver Nuggets to the Utah Jazz. In November 1979, he was signed as a free agent by the New Jersey Nets.

== Coaching career ==
After he finished his pro club basketball playing career, Smith worked as a basketball coach at the AAU level. He coached at the Bill and Lilly Heinrich YMCA in Las Vegas, Nevada, along with his fellow UNLV teammate and lifelong friend, "Sudden" Sam Smith.

== Personal life ==
Smith was born in Los Angeles, California. He suffered a stroke in 2019. He was still recovering as of 2022.

== Career statistics ==
Legend
GP	Games played	GS	Games started	MPG	Minutes per game
FG%	Field goal percentage	3P%	3-point field goal percentage	FT%	Free throw percentage
RPG	Rebounds per game	APG	Assists per game	SPG	Steals per game
BPG	Blocks per game	PPG	Points per game	**Bold**	Career high
*	Led the league

=== NBA ===
==== Regular season ====
Year	Team	GP	GS	MPG	FG%	3P%	FT%	RPG	APG	SPG	BPG	PPG
1977–78	Denver	45		8.4	**.515**		.875	.8	.9	.4	.1	2.7
1978–79	Denver	**82***		18.0	.422		.883	1.8	2.5	.7	**.2**	6.4
1979–80	Utah	6		12.2	.333	–	**1.000**	.5	1.2	.7	.0	1.5
1979–80	New Jersey	59		12.5	.445	**.308**	.862	1.3	1.4	.4	.1	5.2
1980–81	Cleveland	1		**20.0**	.400	–	**1.000**	**3.0**	**3.0**	.0	.0	**8.0**
1981–82	Milwaukee	17	**1**	18.6	.473	.200	.833	.8	2.6	.6	.1	6.8
1982–83	San Diego	5	0	8.6	.154	.000	.875	.6	1.2	**.8**	.0	2.2
1982–83	San Antonio	7	0	3.6	.455	.000	**1.000**	.4	.3	.1	.0	1.7
1984–85	Cleveland	7	0	6.9	.235	.000	.800	.6	1.0	.3	.0	2.3
Career		229	1	13.6	.435	.238	.877	1.3	1.8	.5	.1	5.0

==== Playoffs ====
Year	Team	GP	MPG	FG%	3P%	FT%	RPG	APG	SPG	BPG	PPG
1978	Denver	**11**	8.7	**.654**		.714	.8	1.5	.5	.0	3.5
1979	Denver	3	8.3	.000		**1.000**	.7	1.3	**.7**	.0	.7
1982	Milwaukee	6	**11.3**	.385	**.286**	.875	**1.2**	**2.0**	.2	.0	**4.8**
1983	San Antonio	6	3.2	.444	.000	**1.000**	.8	1.0	.2	.0	1.7
Career		26	8.0	.456	.250	.842	.9	1.5	.4	.0	3.1
