= Evansville Thunder =

- League: CBA
- Founded: 1984
- Folded: 1986
- Capacity: Roberts Municipal Stadium
- Location: Evansville, Indiana
- Team colors: red, tan, white

The Evansville Thunder were a professional basketball team who played in Evansville, Indiana, from 1984 to 1986. The team was a member of the Continental Basketball Association (CBA) and played at Roberts Municipal Stadium. Evansville had previous experience with professional basketball when it was home to the Evansville Agogans of the National Professional Basketball League from 1950 to 1951. The Thunder hired soon-to-be Utah Jazz head coach and University of Evansville alumnus Jerry Sloan to coach the team in 1984, but Sloan left to become an assistant coach for the Utah Jazz prior to coaching any Thunder games.

== All-time roster ==
- Marvin Barnes
- Micah Blunt
- Clyde Bradshaw
- Theran Bullock
- Carlos Clark
- Mike Clark
- Rod Drake
- Derrick Gervin
- Claude Gregory
- Kenny Higgs
- Chris Hughes
- Albert Irving
- Clay Johnson
- Greg Jones
- Harold Keeling
- Donnie Koonce
- Kevin Loder
- Tony Martin
- Carl Mitchell
- Kenny Perry
- Lorenzo Romar
- DeWayne Scales
- Kevin Smith
- Clarence Tillman

== Season-by-season standings ==
Season	GP	W	L	Win%	QW	Pts.	Division	Place	CBA Playoffs	Head coach	Ref
1984–85	48	23	25	.479	95.5	164.5	Western	2^{nd}	First round: Lost to the Detroit Spirits, 3–1	Gary Mazza (7–16)	
1984–85	48	23	25	.479	95.5	164.5	Western	2^{nd}	First round: Lost to the Detroit Spirits, 3–1	Wayne Boultinghouse (4–4)	
1984–85	48	23	25	.479	95.5	164.5	Western	2^{nd}	First round: Lost to the Detroit Spirits, 3–1	Roger Brown (12–5)	
1985–86	43	25	23	.521	97.5	170.5	Western	2^{nd}	First round: Lost to the Cincinnati Slammers, 3–2	Roger Brown (20–20)	
1985–86	43	25	23	.521	97.5	170.5	Western	2^{nd}	First round: Lost to the Cincinnati Slammers, 3–2	David Ellenstein (5–3)	
Totals	91	48	48	.528							

== See also ==
- Sports in Evansville
- List of developmental and minor sports leagues
