= Albuquerque Silvers =

American basketball team

- League: CBA
- Founded: 1980
- Folded: 1985
- History: Alberta Dusters; 1980–1982; Las Vegas Silvers; 1982–1983; Albuquerque Silvers; 1983-1985
- Location: Albuquerque, New Mexico
- Team colors: Blue & Silver

The Albuquerque Silvers were an American basketball team based in Albuquerque, New Mexico, which was a member of the Continental Basketball Association (CBA). The team was coached by Norm Ellenberger, the former coach of the University of New Mexico men's basketball team. The franchise was run by P. Patrick McKernan who was also the president and general manager of the Pacific Coast League Albuquerque Dukes.

The team was previously known as the Las Vegas Silvers, but was re-located to Albuquerque on February 10, 1983 by the CBA after the team owners failed to meet their financial obligation to the league. According to the CBA, Silvers owners Patrick Shimbashi and Ken Ford—who together owned 90 percent of the team—could not agree on a way to fund the team.

== Year-by-year with Alberta Dusters ==
Year	League	GP	W	L	Pct.	GB	Reg. season	Playoffs
1980/81	CBA	42	11	31	.262	16	4th, Western	Lost Western Division Semifinals 2–0 Vs Montana Golden Nuggets
1981/82	CBA	46	12	34	.261		3rd, Western	Did not qualify

== Year-by-year with Las Vegas Silvers ==
Year	League	Reg. season	Playoffs
1982/83	CBA	N/A	N/A

== Year-by-year with Albuquerque Silvers ==
Year	League	GP	W	L	pct.	GB	Reg. season	Playoffs
1982/83	CBA	44	17	27	.386		4th, Western	Did not qualify
1983/84	CBA	44	11	33	.250		6th, Western	Did not qualify
1984/85	CBA	48	18	30	.375		7th, Western	Did not qualify
