= List of Continental Basketball Association All-Star Games =

CBA All-Star Classic
- Status: Inactive
- Inaugurated: 1949
- Most recent: 2008
- Organizer: CBA

The CBA All-Star Game (or CBA All-Star Classic) was a basketball event organised by the Continental Basketball Association from 1979 until 2008. It started originally in 1949 as the EBA All-Star Game, and in 1971 it became the EPSBL All-Star Game, following the League's name changes. In 1979 CBA organised its first event under the CBA logo and it had been known as the CBA All-Star Classic. Overall, it predates the NBA All-Star Game by two years, as the latter took place for first time in 1951.
The players who hold the record with the most CBA All-Star appearances since 1979 are former NBA star Tim Legler, Ronnie Fields and Claude Gregory who also had a brief NBA spell. Additionally the coaches with the most appearances since 1979 are Eric Musselman with 5, Paul Woolpert, Chris Daleo and Dan Panaggio with 4 and Bill Musselman with 3.
The slam-dunk contest was added on the 1988 edition and the long distance shoot contest on the 1990 and onwards. Many legendary and former NBA players like Bob McNeill, Jim Bostic, Eddie Johnson, Mario Elie, Jim Lampley, Stacey King, Anthony Frederick, Ron Rowan, David Thirdkill, Claude Gregory, Steve Burtt Sr., Conner Henry, Michael Hawkins, Michael Brooks, Scott Fisher, Jack Haley, Tony Harris, Tim Legler, Jamario Moon and others have featured in the All-Star Game.

== Format ==
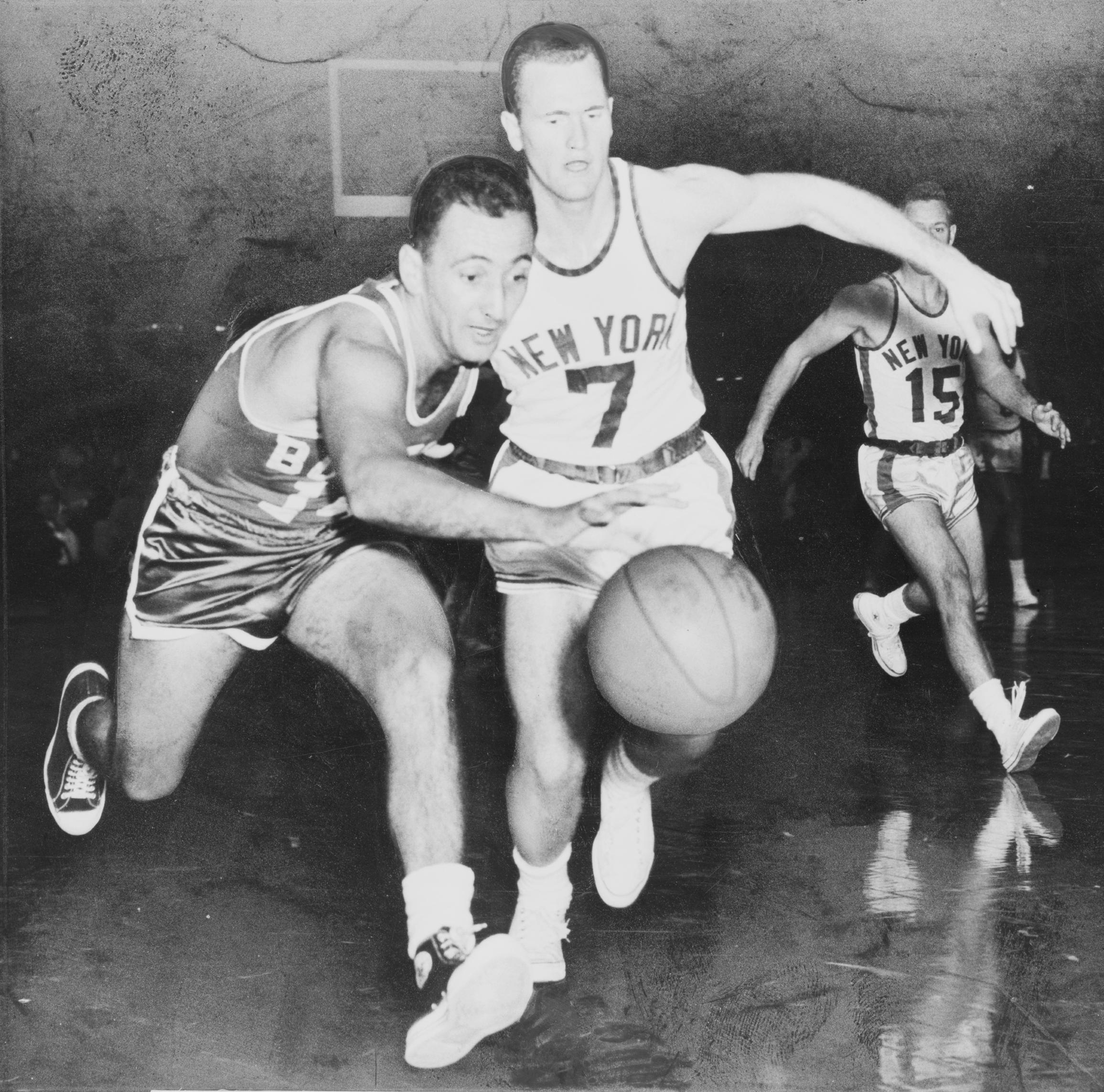
Bob McNeill was named the MVP on two occasions.

The first All-Star Game in 1949 featured an XI consisted of EPBL All-Stars against the host team of Pottsville Packers. The West All-Stars versus East All-Stars format continued for the following years until 1962. For most of the years to follow an EPBL All-Star squad would face a host team and the same pattern continued when the league was rename to EBA and then CBA. On 28 October 1986 the CBA All-Stars played against the Soviet National basketball team of Vladimir Tkachenko, Sarunas Marciulionis and Aleksander Volkov, the first game to be played between a Soviet team and professional players from the United States (score 72-77). The CBA All-Stars were led by Kenny Natt (Albany Patroons), Billy Goodwin, Cozell McQueen, and Derrick Rowland.

The National Conference versus American Conference format was played from 1990 until 2004. It was followed by the Eastern Conference versus Western Conference format until 2008. The 1982 All-star game was the first nationally televised minor league game in history. In 1990 the CBA instituted the all-star weekend, introducing slam-dunk and long-distance shooting contests.

== All-Star Game Results ==
Note: Stadium names are named based on the name at the day of the All-Star Game.

Year	Result	Host arena	Host city	Game MVP
1949	EPBL All-Stars 74, Pottsville Packers 69	N/A	Pottsville, Pennsylvania	N/A
1958	West All-Stars 122, East All-Stars 97	109th Street West Side Armory	Wilkes-Barre, Pennsylvania	N/A
1959	West All-Stars 110, East All-Stars 88	109th Street West Side Armory	Wilkes-Barre, Pennsylvania	N/A
1961	East All-Stars 164, West All-Stars 128	109th Street West Side Armory	Wilkes-Barre, Pennsylvania	Boo Ellis
1962	EPBL All-Stars 124, Allentown Jets 119	Rockne Hall	Allentown, Pennsylvania	N/A
1963	Camden Bullets 122, EPBL All-Stars 114	Convention Hall	Camden, New Jersey	Bob McNeill
1964	South All-Stars 137, North All-Stars 125	Trenton High School	Trenton, New Jersey	Jim Hadnot
1965	Camden Bullets 147, EPBL All-Stars 129	Convention Hall	Camden, New Jersey	Bob McNeill (2)
1966	East All-Stars 167, West All-Stars 159	Farm Show Arena	Harrisburg, Pennsylvania	Walt Simon
1967	West All-Stars 158, East All-Stars 149	Salesianum School	Wilmington, Delaware	Willie Murrell
1968	East All-Stars 155, West All-Stars 125	Hartford Public High School	Hartford, Connecticut	Spider Bennett
1969	West All-Stars 163, East All-Stars 133	Catholic Youth Center	Scranton, Pennsylvania	Jim Jackson
1970	Wilmington Blue Bombers 129, All-Stars 123	Salesianum School	Wilmington, Delaware	John Savage
1971	Scranton Apollos 146, EBA All-Stars 123	Catholic Youth Center	Scranton, Pennsylvania	Willie Somerset
1972	EBA All-Stars 129, Scranton Apollos 110	Catholic Youth Center	Scranton, Pennsylvania	Reggie Lacefield
1976	EBA All-Stars 137, Allentown Jets 134	William Penn Senior High School	York, Pennsylvania	N/A
1977	EBA All-Stars 136, Allentown Jets 118	Allen Phys. Ed. Center	Allentown, Pennsylvania	Jim Bostic
1978	East All-Stars 135, West All-Stars 129	Quincy YMCA	Quincy, Massachusetts	Jim Bostic (2)
1979	Rochester Zeniths 182, West All-Stars 168	Dome Arena	Henrietta, New York	Andre McCarter
1982	Western Division 101, Eastern Division 91	Brendan Byrne Arena	East Rutherford, New Jersey	Brad Branson
1983	Albany Patroons 122, CBA All-Stars 109	Washington Avenue Armory	Albany, New York	Larry Spriggs
1984	CBA All-Stars 128, Wyoming Wildcatters 125	Casper Events Center	Casper, Wyoming	Anthony Roberts
1985	CBA All-Stars 113, Evansville Thunder 109	Roberts Municipal Stadium	Evansville, Indiana	Rick Lamb
1986	CBA All-Stars 110, Tampa Bay Thrillers 108	Tampa SunDome	Tampa Bay, Florida	Don Collins
1987	CBA All-Stars 105, La Crosse Catbirds 102	La Crosse Center	La Crosse, Wisconsin	Eddie L. Johnson
1988	CBA All-Stars 115, Topeka Sizzlers 94	Landon Arena	Topeka, Kansas	Michael Brooks
1988-89	Rockford Lightning 103, CBA All-Stars 97	Rockford Metrocenter	Rockford, Illinois	Dwayne McClain
1990	National Conference 107, American Conference 105	Wharton Field House	Moline, Illinois	Conner Henry
1991	National Conference 120, American Conference 116	Five Seasons Center	Cedar Rapids, Iowa	Vincent Askew
1992	National Conference 124, American Conference 115	Yakima SunDome	Yakima, Washington	Conner Henry (2)
1993	American Conference 133, National Conference 121	Myriad Convention Center	Oklahoma City, Oklahoma	Pat Durham
1994	American Conference 119, National Conference 108	Allen County War Memorial Coliseum	Fort Wayne, Indiana	Jeff Martin
1995	National Conference 119, American Conference 115	Hartford Civic Arena	Hartford, Connecticut	Tony Dawson
1996	National Conference 121, American Conference 105	Sioux Falls Arena	Sioux Falls, South Dakota	Shelton Jones
1997	American Conference 107, National Conference 98	Yakima SunDome	Yakima, Washington	Dexter Boney
2000	Eastern Division 135, Western Division 124	Sioux Falls Arena	Sioux Falls, South Dakota	Dontae' Jones
2001	Despite that the All-Stars were selected, it was cancelled in January. The CBA folded on February 8, 2001			
2003	National Conference 140, American Conference 125	Sioux Falls Arena	Sioux Falls, South Dakota	Versile Shaw
2004	National Conference 105, American Conference 103	Yakima SunDome	Yakima, Washington	Roberto Bergersen
2005	Eastern Conference 114, Western Conference 110	Genesis Convention Center	Gary, Indiana	Sam Clancy, Jr.
2006	Western Conference 119, Eastern Conference 110	Qwest Arena	Boise, Idaho	Randy Holcomb
2007	National Conference 134, American Conference 131 (OT)	Butte Civic Center	Butte, Montana	Ralph Holmes
2008	National Conference 109, American Conference 107	Yakima SunDome	Yakima, Washington	Odell Bradley

- EBA 1949-1970, EPBL 1971-1978, CBA 1979-2008

=== Players with most MVP awards ===
Player	Wins	Editions
(United States) Bob McNeill	2	1963, 1965
(United States) Jim Bostic	2	1977, 1978
(United States) Conner Henry	2	1990, 1992

== Wins by team (1949-2008) ==
Team	Wins	Years
CBA/EBA/EPBL All-Stars	10	1949, 1962, 1972, 1976, 1977, 1984, 1985, 1986, 1987, 1988
National Conference	9	1990, 1991, 1992, 1995, 1996, 2003, 2004, 2007, 2008
East	6	1961, 1966, 1968, 1978, 2000, 2005
West	6	1958, 1959, 1967, 1969, 1982, 2006
American Conference	3	1993, 1994, 1997
Camden Bullets	2	1963, 1965
Wilmington Blue Bombers	1	1970
Scranton Apollos	1	1971
Rochester Zeniths	1	1979
Albany Patroons	1	1983
Rockford Lightning	1	1988-89

== Most Valuable Player Award winners ==
- 1961 – (United States) Alex "Boo" Ellis, Wilkes-Barre Barons
- 1963 – (United States) Bobby McNeill, Camden Bullets
- 1964 – (United States) Jimmie Hadnot, Trenton Colonials
- 1965 – (United States) Bobby McNeill, Camden Bullets
- 1966 – (United States) Walt Simon, Allentown Jets
- 1967 – (United States) Willie Murrell, Scranton Miners
- 1968 – (United States) Willis "Spider" Bennett, Hartford Capitols
- 1969 – (United States) Jim Jackson, Scranton Miners
- 1970 – (United States) John Savage, Wilmington Blue Bombers
- 1971 – (United States) Willie Somerset, Scranton Apollos
- 1972 – (United States) Reggie Lacefield, Hartford Capitols
- 1977 – (United States) Jim Bostic, Jersey Shore Bullets
- 1978 – (United States) Jim Bostic, Jersey Shore Bullets
- 1979 – (United States) Andre McCarter, Rochester Zeniths
- 1982 – (United States) Brad Branson, Anchorage Northern Knights
- 1983 – (United States) Larry Spriggs, Albany Patroons
- 1984 – (United States) Anthony Roberts, Wyoming Wildcatters
- 1985 – (United States) Rick Lamb, Wyoming Wildcatters
- 1986 – (United States) Don Collins, Tampa Bay Thrillers
- 1987 – (United States) Eddie Johnson, Tampa Bay Thrillers
- 1988 – (United States) Michael Brooks, Albany Patroons
- 1989 – (United States) Dwayne McClain, Rockford Lightning
- 1990 – (United States) Conner Henry, Rapid City Thrillers
- 1991 – (United States) Vincent Askew, Albany Patroons
- 1992 – (United States) Conner Henry, Yakima Sun Kings
- 1993 – (United States) Pat Durham, Fargo-Moorhead Fever
- 1994 – (United States) Jeff Martin, Grand Rapids Hoops
- 1995 – (United States) Tony Dawson, Rockford Lightning
- 1996 – (United States) Shelton Jones, Florida Beachdogs
- 1997 – (United States) Dexter Boney, Florida Beachdogs
- 2000 – (United States) Dontae' Jones, LaCrosse Bobcats
- 2003 – (United States) Versile Shaw, Sioux Falls Skyforce
- 2004 – (United States) Roberto Bergersen, Idaho Stampede
- 2005 – (United States) Sam Clancy, Jr., Idaho Stampede
- 2006 – (United States) Randy Holcomb, Gary Steelheads
- 2007 – (United States) Ralph Holmes, Yakama Sun Kings
- 2008 – (United States) Odell Bradley, Butte Daredevils

== Slam-Dunk champions (1988-2008) ==
Year	Player	Team
1988	(United States) Jamie Waller	Quad City Thunder
1988-89	(United States) Daren Queenan	Charleston Gunners
1990	(United States) Gerry Wright	Pensacola Tornados
1991	Not held	
1992	(United States) Myron Brown	Fort Wayne Fury
1993	(United States) Shelton Jones	Rapid City Thrillers
1994	(United States) Myron Brown (2)	Fort Wayne Fury
1995	(United States) Terry Ross	Tri-City Chinook
1996	(United States) Shelton Jones (2)	Florida Beach Dogs
1997	(United States) Ronnie Fields	La Crosse Bobcats
2003	(United States) Bryant Notree	Gary Steelheads
2004	(United States) Kaniel Dickens	Dakota Wizards
2005	(United States) Renaldo Major	Gary Steelheads
2006	(Sierra Leone) (Libya) Alpha Bangura	Michigan Mayhem
2007	(United States) Anthony Richardson	Butte Daredevils
2008	(United States) Harvey Thomas	Yakima Sun Kings

== Long Distance Shootout Contest ==
Year	Player	Team
1990	(United States) Jose Slaughter	Quad City Thunder
1991	(United States) Everette Stephens	Rockford Lightning
1992	(United States) Duane Washington	Columbus Horizon
1993	(United States) Tim Legler	Omaha Racers
1994	(United States) Leon Wood	Fargo-Moorhead Fever
1995	(United States) Charles Smith	Hartford Hellcats
1996	(United States) Darryl Johnson	Omaha Racers
1997	(United States) Tony Harris	Sioux Falls Skyforce
2003	(United States) Malik Dixon	Dakota Wizards
2004	(United States) Jimmie Hunter	Rockford Lightning
2005	(United States) David Graves	Gary Steelheads
2006	(United States) David Jackson	Idaho Stampede
2007	(United States) David Bell	Butte Daredevils
2008	(United States) Desmond Ferguson	Yakima Sun Kings

== One-on-One challenge ==
Year	Player	Team
1991	(United States) Mario Elie	Albany Patroons
1992	(United States) Richard Rellford	Sioux Falls Skyforce
1993		
1994	(United States) Dan Bingenheimer	Hartford Hellcats

== Top Scorers ==
- 1959 – (United States) Bill Spivey, West All Stars, 28 pts
- 1961 – (United States) Boo Ellis, East All Stars, 29 pts
- 1962 – (United States) Ed Burton, Allentown Jets, 32 pts
- 1963 – (United States) Paul Arizin, Camden Bullets, 35 pts
- 1964 – (United States) Jimmy Hadnot, South All Stars, 31 pts
- 1965 – (United States) Bobby McNeil, Camden Bullets, 29 pts
- 1966 – (United States) Walt Simon, East All Stars, 37 pts
- 1967 – (United States) Art Heyman, East All Stars, 39 pts
- 1968 – (United States) Spider Bennett, East All Stars, 36 pts
- 1969 – (United States) Phil Schoff, East All Stars, 22 pts
  & Willie Davis, West All Stars, 22 pts
- 1970 – (United States) Stan Pawlak, EPBL All Stars, 39 pts
- 1971 – (United States) Willie Somerset, EBA All Stars, 36 pts
- 1972 – (United States) Chuck Lloyd, Scranton Apollos, 27 pts
- 1976 – (United States) Charlie Criss, EBA All Stars, 35 pts
- 1977 – (United States) Major Jones, Allentown Jets, 27 pts
- 1978 – (United States) Jim Bostic, East All Stars, 26 pts
- 1979 – (United States) Ron Davis, CBA All Stars, 47 pts
- 1983 – (United States) Larry Spriggs, Albany Patroons, 22 pts
- 1984 – (United States) Anthony Roberts, Wyoming Wildcatters, 43 pts
- 1985 – (United States) Rick Lamb, CBA All Stars, 19 pts
- 1986 – (United States) Don Collins, CBA All Stars, 21 pts
- 1987 – (United States) Eddie Johnson, CBA All Stars, 22 pts
- 1988 – (United States) Jerome Batiste, Topeka Sizzlers, 21 pts
- 1988-89 – (United States) Dwayne McClain, CBA All Stars, 18 pts
- 1990 – (United States) Tim Legler, National Conference, 17 pts
- 1991 – (United States) Mario Elie, National Conference, 22 pts
- 1992 – (United States) Stephen Thompson, American Conference, 22 pts
- 1993 – (United States) Pat Durham, National Conference, 22 pts
- 1994 – (United States) Jeff Martin, American Conference, 20 pts
- 1995 – (United States) Tony Dawson, American Conference, 25 pts
- 1996 – (United States) Henry James, National Conference, 24 pts
- 1997 – (United States) Dexter Boney, American Conference, 25 pts
- 2000 – (United States) Dontae' Jones, Eastern Conference, 34 pts
- 2003 – (United States) Versile Shaw, National Conference, 27 pts
- 2004 – (United States) Roberto Bergersen, American Conference, 27 pts
- 2005 – (United States) Sam Clancy Jr., Western Conference, 19 pts
- 2006 – (United States) David Jackson, Western Conference, 22 pts
- 2007 – (United States) Erick Barkley/Ralph Holmes, American /National Conference, 25 pts
- 2008 – (United States) Odell Bradley, National Conference, 22 pts

== Highest attendances ==
Edition	Venue	Location	Attendance
1982	Brendan Byrne Arena	East Rutherford, New Jersey	10,000
1983	Washington Avenue Armory	Albany, New York	11,272
1984	Casper Events Center	Casper, Wyoming	7,398
1985	Roberts Municipal Stadium	Evansville, Indiana	8,537
1987	La Crosse Center	La Crosse, Wisconsin	6,011
1988	Landon Arena	Topeka, Kansas	7,040
1989	Rockford Metrocenter	Rockford, Illinois	6,572
1993	Myriad Convention Center	Oklahoma City	11,382
1994	Allen County War Memorial Coliseum	Fort Wayne, Indiana	6,324
1995	Hartford Civic Arena	Hartford, Connecticut	10,039
2003	Sioux Falls Arena	Sioux Falls, South Dakota	7,500
2005	Genesis Convention Center	Gary, Indiana	6,683

== All-Star Coaches ==
=== Coaches 1979-2008 ===
Coach	American Conference	National Conference	East	West	CBA All-Stars	Host team
(United States) Eric Musselman (5)	-	1990, 1992, 1993, 1994, 1997	-	-	-	-
(United States) Paul Woolpert (4)	-	2007, 2008	-	2000, 2006	-	-
(United States) Chris Daleo (4)	2003, 2008	-	2005, 2006	-	-	-
(United States) Phil Jackson (2)	-	-	-	-	1985	1983 (Albany Patroons)
(United States) George Karl (2)	-	1991	-	-	1988-89	-
(United States) Flip Saunders (2)	1994	1995	-	-	-	-
(United States) Cazzie Russell (2)	-	-	1982	-	1983	-

=== Coaches with most victories ===
Coach	Wins	Editions	Notes
(United States) Stan Novak	4	1969 (first win)	
(United States) Eric Musselman	3	1990, 1992, 1997	
(United States) Paul Woolpert	3	2000, 2007, 2008	
(United States) Buddy Donnelly	3	1963, 1964, 1965	
(United States) Bill Musselman	2	1987, 1988	
(United States) Flip Saunders	2	1994, 1995	
(United States) Phil Jackson	2	1983, 1985	4x NBA All-Star coach

== All-Star Players ==
=== Players with most appearances (1979-2008) ===
Player	All-Star	Editions	Notes
(United States) Tim Legler	4	1990, 1992, 1993, 1995	1x CBA Long Distance Winner (1993), 1x NBA Three-Point Contest Winner (1998)
(United States) Claude Gregory	4	1985, 1986, 1987, 1988	As an Evanville Thunder player in the 1985 All-Star Classic
(United States) Ronnie Fields	4	2003, 2004, 2006, 2008-DNP	1x Slam Dunk Winner (1997)
(United States) Tom Hemans	4	1958, 1959, 1962, 1966	
(United States) Vincent Askew	3	1988-89, 1990, 1991	2x MVP
(United States) Jose Slaughter	3	1985, 1988-89, 1990	As a Rockford Lightning player in 1988-89 edition
(United States) Rick Lamb	3	1985, 1986, 1987	As a Tampa Bay Thrillers player in the 1986 edition
(United States) Robert Smith	3	1983, 1984, 1985	
(United States) (Republic of Ireland) Ron Rowan	3	1987, 1988, 1988-89	As a Rockford Lightning player in 1988-89 edition
(United States) Leon Wood	3	1990, 1994, 1996	-
(United States) Reggie Jordan	3	1993, 1994, 1996	-
(United States) Jerome Lane	3	1994, 1995, 1996	
(United States) Henry James	3	1993, 1995, 1996	
(United States) Ralph McPherson	3	1983, 1984, 1985	As Albany Patroons player in 1983

=== Notable CBA All-Stars ===
- (United States) Paul Arizin (1963, 1964, 1965)
- (Puerto Rico) Larry Ayuso (2003)
- (United States) Anthony Bonner (2004)
- (United States) Don Collins (1986, 1987)
- (United States) Winston Crite (1990)
- (United States) Lloyd Daniels (1988, 1995)
- (United States) Darryl Dawkins (1996)
- (United States) Mario Elie (1991)
- (United States) (Australia) Scott Fisher (1990)
- (United States) Alphonso Ford (1994, 1995)
- (United States) Tom Hemans (1958, 1959, 1962, 1966)
- (United States) Conner Henry (1990, 1992)
- (United States) Anthony Goldwire (1996, 2004)
- (United States) Derrick Gervin (1990, 1992)
- (United States) Shelton Jones (1993, 1996
- (United States) Eddie L. Johnson (1987)
- (United States) Bob Love (1966)
- (United States) Pace Mannion (1988-89)
- (United States) Anthony Mason (1991)
- (United States) John Starks (1990)
- (United States) Charles Smith (1995, 2000)
- (United States) Roy Tarpley (2004)
- (United States) Clinton Wheeler (1986, 1994)

== Sources ==
- HISTORY OF THE CBA ALL STAR GAME

== See also ==
- Continental Basketball Association
- List of Continental Basketball Association seasons
- Continental Basketball Association franchise history
- List of Continental Basketball Association Champions
- List of Continental Basketball Association MVP's and Notable Alumni
- List of developmental and minor sports leagues
