= 1993 CBA All-Star Game =

1993 CBA organised All-Star Game

| American Conference | National Conference |
|---|---|
| 133 | 121 |
- Date: January 13, 1993
- Venue: Myriad Convention Center, Oklahoma City
- MVP: Pat Durham
- Attendance: 11,382

The 1993 Continental Basketball Association All-Star Game was the 31st All-Star Game organised by CBA since its inception in 1949. It was held at the Myriad Convention Center in Oklahoma City, Oklahoma on January 13, 1993, in front of 10,039 spectators. The American Conference defeated the National Conference 133–121. The record crowd, surpassed Albany's previous record (11,272) from 1983, by 110 fans.

Fourteen of the 22 CBA all-stars of 1993 had NBA experience, having played in a combined 806 NBA games. La Crosse guard Kevin Williams, a 31-year-old veteran, was on top of this list having played in 260 NBA games.

Pat Durham was named the MVP despite playing on the losing team. La Crosse guard Kevin Williams, the runner-up in the MVP balloting was furious about it after the game.

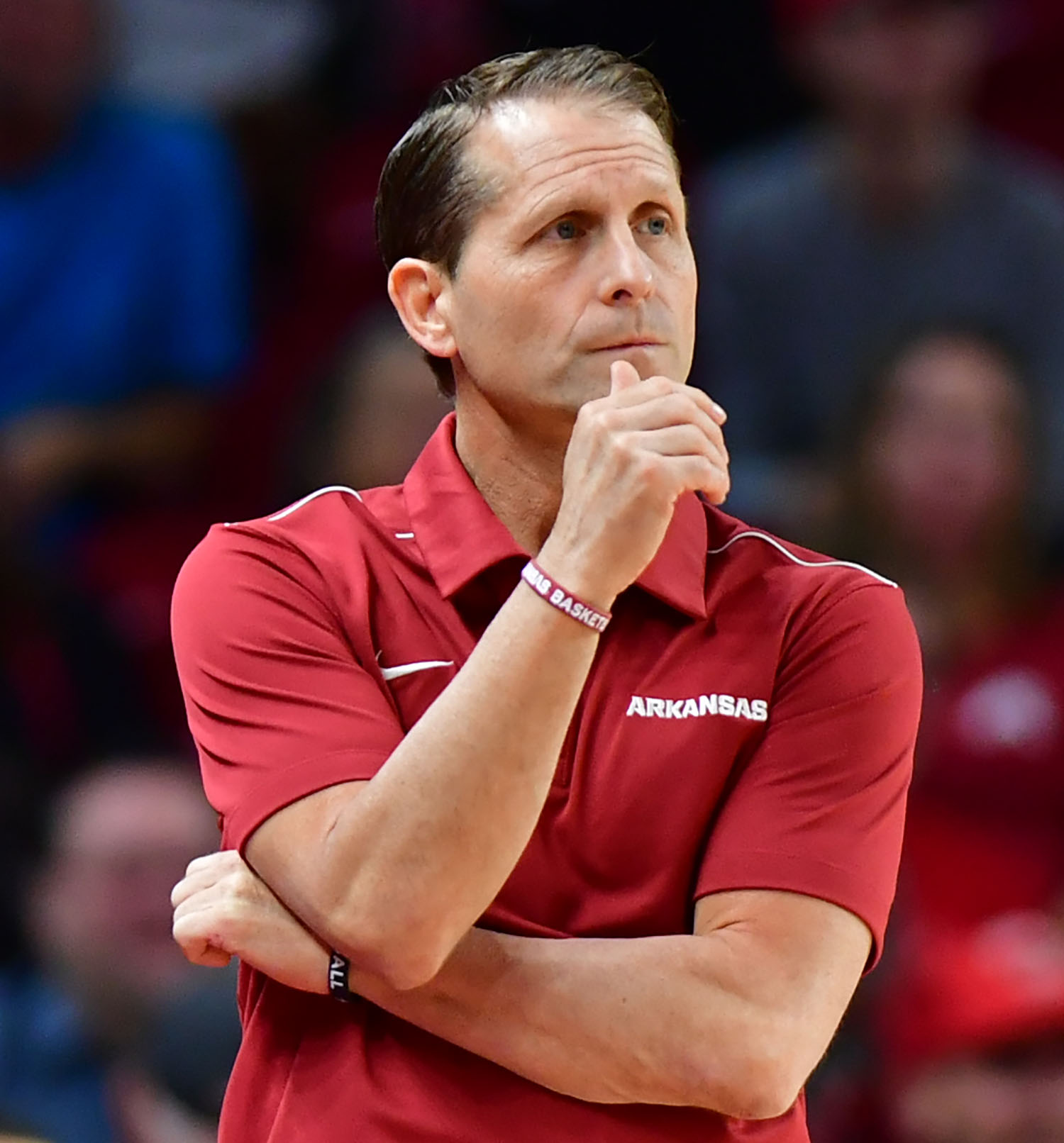
Eric Musselman was the coach for the National All-Stars

== The 1993 CBA All-Star Game events ==
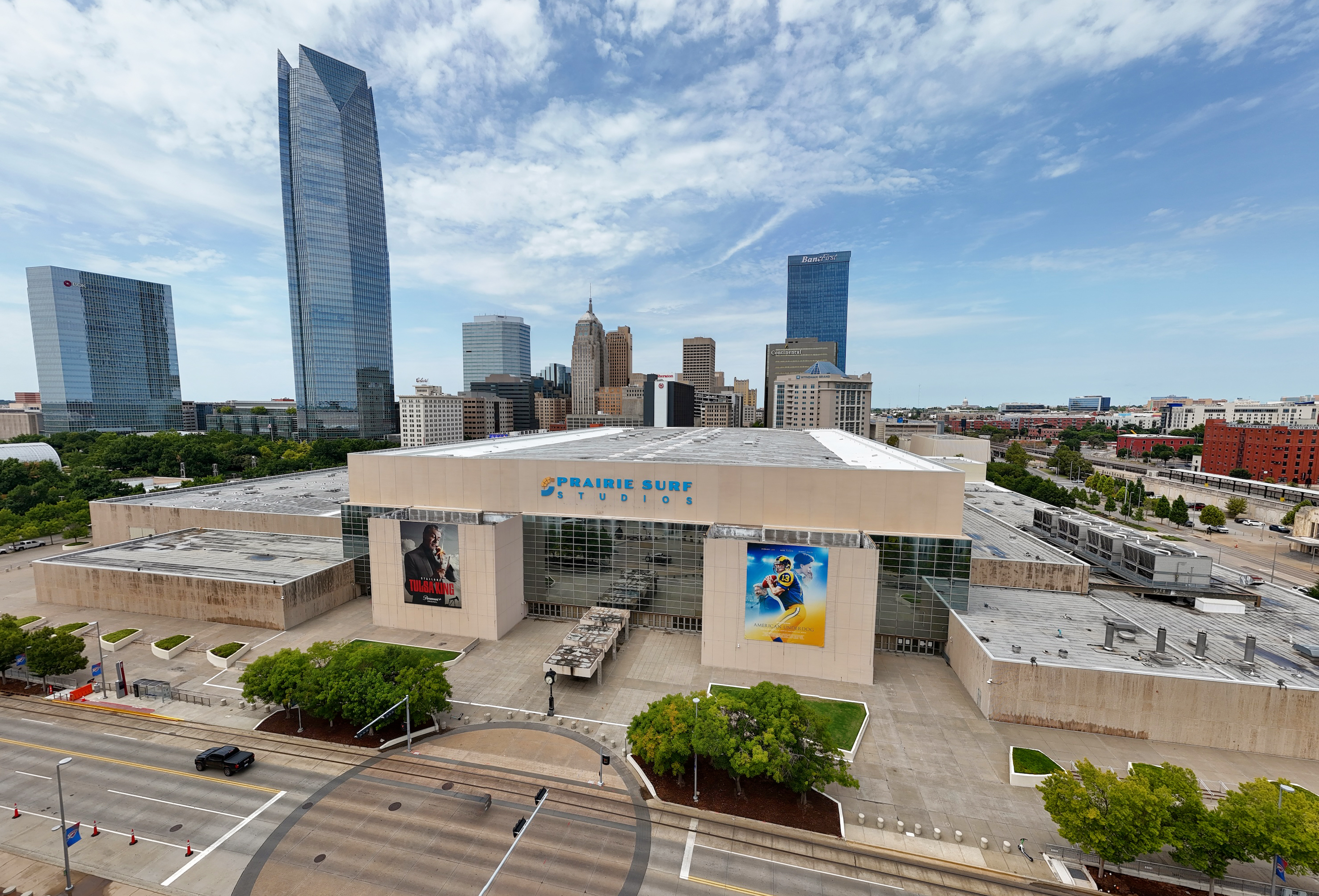
The Myriad Convention Center

=== CBA Long Distance Shootout ===
Tim Legler of Omaha Racers was the winner.

=== Slum-dunk ===
Shelton Jones of Rapid City Thrillers was the winner.

=== The Game ===
The National Conference led most of the first three quarters. However, Williams, Ronnie Thompkins (16 points) and Reggie Jordan (19 points) helped the American stars dominate the fourth quarter by 38–25. Pat Durham scored 22 pts, and he came second only to teammate Shelton Jones (23 pts) who was the topscorer of the game.

Utah Jazz president Frank Layden, was one of three featured NBA guests.

== All-Star teams ==
=== Rosters ===
National Conference
| Pos. | Player | Team | Previous appearances |
Team
| G | (United States) (Israel) Stanley Brundy | Rapid City Thrillers | |
| G | (United States) Tim Legler | Omaha Racers | 1990, 1992 |
| G | (United States) Tank Collins | Yakima SunKings | |
| G | (United States) Pat Durham | Fargo-Moorhead Fever | 1991 |
| F | (United States) Henry James | Wichita Falls Texans | |
| F | (United States) Shelton Jones | Rapid City Thrillers | |
| F | (United States) Scott Meents | Yakima Sun Kings | |
| F | (United States) Sebastian Neal | Oklahoma City Cavalry | |
| C | (United States) Wayne Tinkle | Tri-City Chinook | |
| F | (United States) Henry Williams | Wichita Falls Texans | |
| G | (United States) A. J. Wynder | Tri-City Chinook | |
Head coach: (United States) Eric Musselman (Rapid City Thrillers)

American Conference
| Pos. | Player | Team | Previous appearances |
Team
| G | (United States) Kevin Williams | La Crosse Catbirds | |
| F | (United States) Reggie Jordan | Grand Rapids Hoops | |
| F | (United States) Ronnie Thompkins | Grand Rapids Hoops | |
| F | (United States) Derek Strong | Quad City Thunder | |
| G | (United States) Tony Farmer | Fort Wayne Fury | |
| F | (United States) Andre Spencer | Rockford Lightning | |
| F | (United States) Mike Smith | Oklahoma City Cavalry | |
| G | (United States) Duane Washington | Rockford Lightning | |
| G | (United States) Brian Oliver | Rockford Lightning | |
| F | (United States) Barry Mitchell | Quad City Thunder | 1992 |
| C | (United States) Lorenzo Williams | Rockford Lightning | |
Head coach: (United States) Dan Panaggio (Quad City Thunder)

=== Result ===
| Team 1 | Score | Team 2 |
|---|---|---|
| National Conference | 121 - 133 | American Conference |

== Awards ==
| MVP | Topscorer | Slam-dunk champion | Long Distance Shootout Winner |
|---|---|---|---|
| (United States) Pat Durham | (United States) Shelton Jones | (United States) Shelton Jones | (United States) Tim Legler |

== See also ==
- 1992 CBA All-Star Game
- Continental Basketball Association

== Sources ==
- 1993 CBA All-Star Rosters
