= 1992 CBA All-Star Game =

American Conference	National Conference
115	124
- Date: January 23, 1992
- Venue: Yakima SunDome, Yakima
- MVP: Conner Henry
- Attendance: 5,400

The 1992 Continental Basketball Association All-Star Game was the 30th All-Star Game organised by CBA since its inception in 1949. It was held at the Yakima SunDome in Yakima, Washington on January 23, 1992, in front of a sell-out crowd of 5,400. The National Conference defeated the American Conference 124-115.

Conner Henry was named the MVP for a second time, after winning the award in the 1990 edition.

== The 1992 CBA All-Star Game events ==
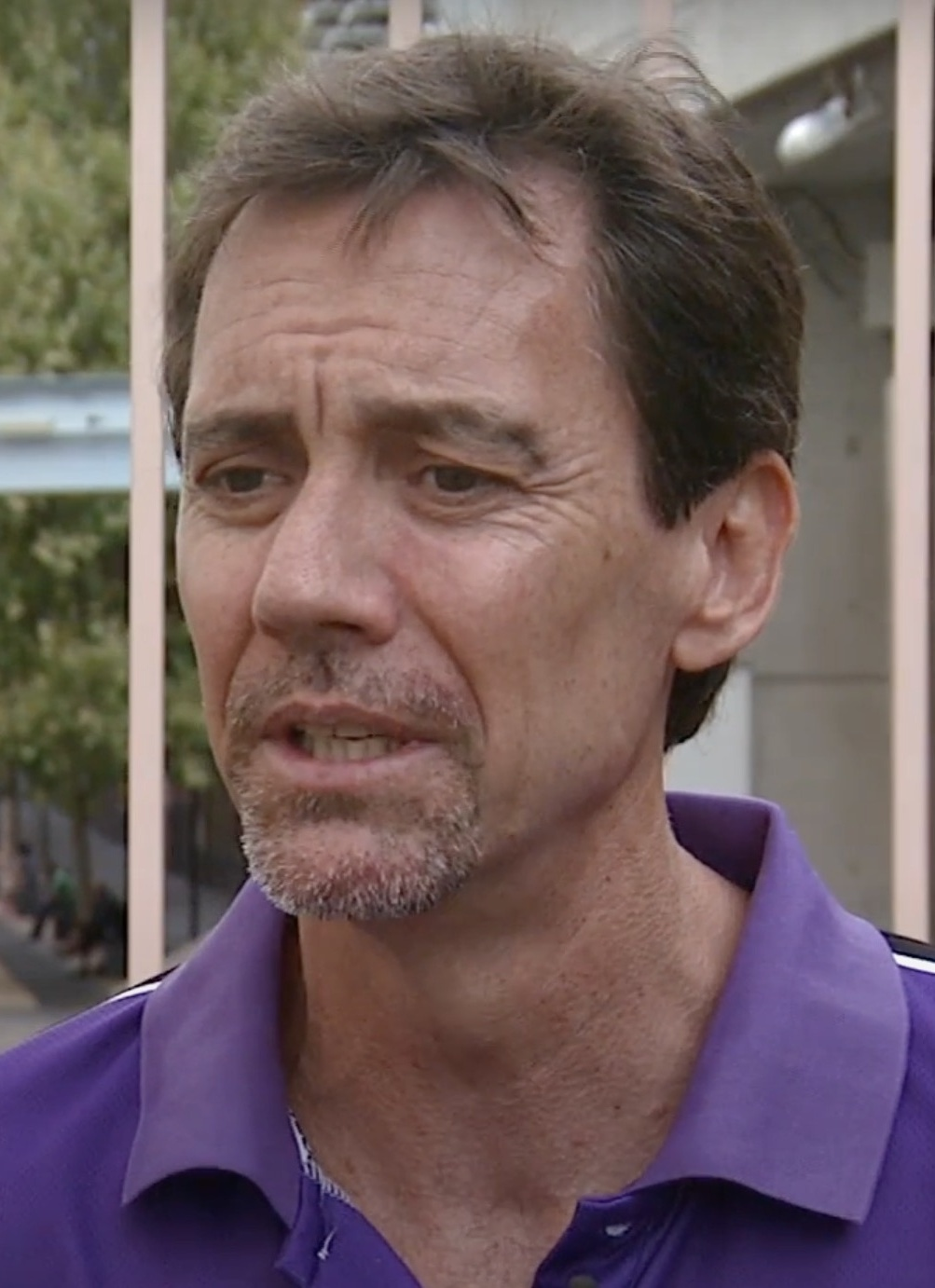
Conner Henry won his 2nd MVP award (here in 2011)

=== CBA Long Distance Shootout ===
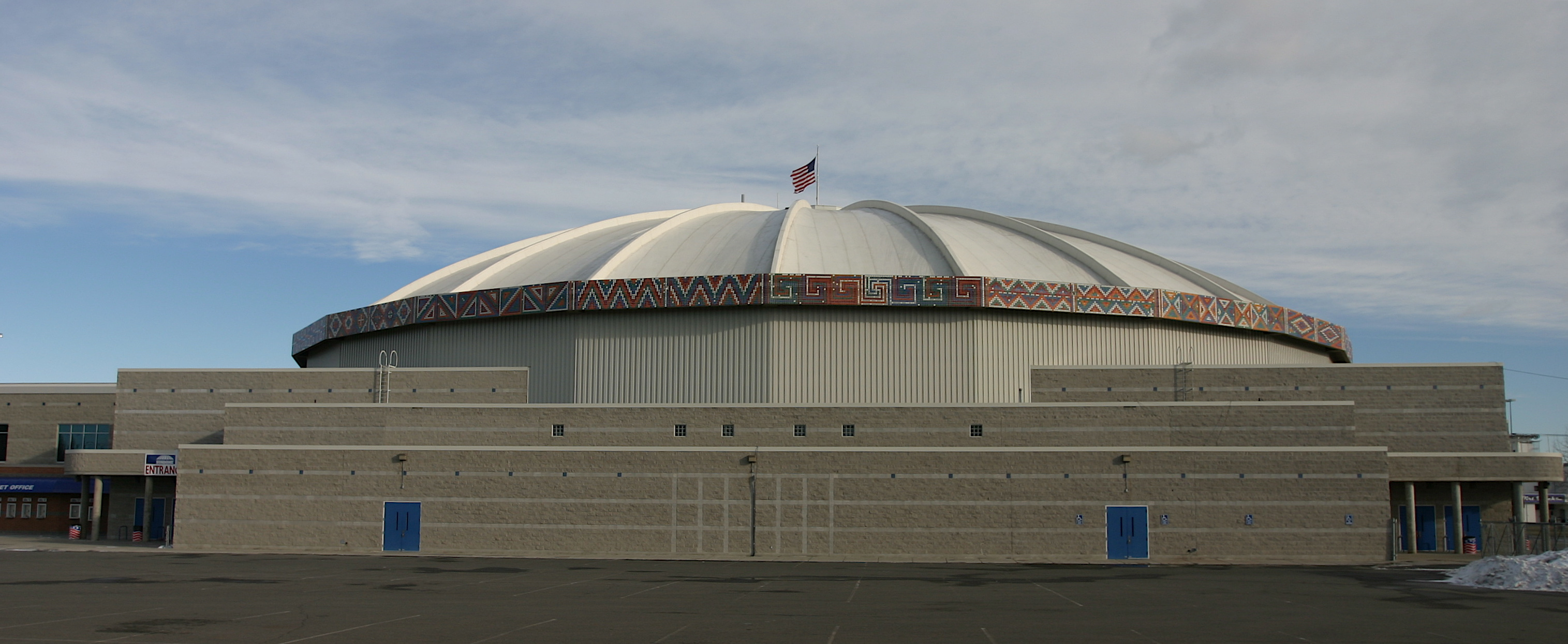
The Yakima Sundome venue.

Duane Washington of Columbus Horizon was the winner.

=== Slum-dunk ===
Myron Brown of Fort Wayne Fury was the winner with Stevie Thompson the runner-up.

=== One-on-one challenge ===
Richard Rellford beat Stevie Thompson 14-12 in the semifinals of the one-on-one challenge.

=== The Game ===
Stephen Thompson was the top scorer of the match with 22 pts for the National Conference. MVP Conner Henry scored 18 (thirteen of them in the 4th quarter), while Steve Burtt was the 3d scorer of his team with 17 pts. Richard Rellford scored 12 pts.

On the other side, Derrick Gervin of Fort Wayne Fury scored 21 pts for the American Conference.

== All-Star teams ==
=== Rosters ===
National Conference
Pos.	Player	Team	Previous appearances
Team
G	(United States) (Israel) Stanley Brundy	Rapid City Thrillers	
G	(United States) Tim Legler	Omaha Racers	1990
C	(United States) Richard Rellford	Sioux Falls Skyforce	
C	(United States) Jim Usevitch	Tri-City Chinook	
F	(United States) Conner Henry	Yakima Sun Kings	1990
C	(United States) Kurt Portmann	Wichita Falls Texans	
C	(United States) Jawaan Oldham	Tulsa Zone	
F	(United States) Tracy Moore	Tulsa Zone	
G	(United States) Steve Burtt Sr.	Oklahoma City Cavalry	
F	(United States) Stevie Thompson	Oklahoma City Cavalry	1991
F	(United States) Ronnie Grandison	Omaha Racers	
Head coach: (United States) Eric Musselman (Rapid City Thrillers)

American Conference
Pos.	Player	Team	Previous appearances
Team
F	(United States) Kenny Battle	La Crosse Catbirds	
F	(United States) Mark Davis	La Crosse Catbirds	
F	(United States) Barry Mitchell	Quad City Thunder	
C	(United States) Steve Scheffler	Quad City Thunder	
F	(United States) Jim Farmer	Birmingham Bandits	
G	(United States) Derrick Gervin	Fort Wayne Fury	1990
F	(United States) Byron Irvin	Columbus Horizon	
F	(United States) Jeff Martin	Grand Rapids Hoops	
F	(United States) Jeff Sanders	Albany Patroons	
C	(United States) Gerald Paddio	Rockford Lightning	
Head coach:

=== Result ===
Team 1	Score	Team 2
National Conference	124 - 115	American Conference

== Awards ==
MVP	Topscorer	Slam-dunk champion	Long Distance Shootout Winner	One-on-One Champion
(United States) Conner Henry	(United States) Stevie Thompson	(United States) Myron Brown	(United States) Duane Washington	(United States) Richard Rellford

== Former NBA players ==
- (United States) (Israel) Stanley Brundy
- (United States) Richard Rellford
- (United States) Conner Henry
- (United States) Jawann Oldham
- (United States) Steve Burtt Sr.
- (United States) Ronnie Grandison
- (United States) Kenny Battle
- (United States) Mark Davis
- (United States) Steve Scheffler
- (United States) Derrick Gervin
- (United States) Byron Irvin
- (United States) Jeff Martin
- (United States) Jeff Sanders
- (United States) Gerald Paddio

== See also ==
- 1991 CBA All-Star Game
- Continental Basketball Association

== Sources ==
- HISTORY OF THE CBA ALL STAR GAME
