= 1994 CBA All-Star Game =

1994 CBA organised All-Star Game

American Conference	National Conference
119	108
- Date: January 24, 1994
- Venue: Allen County War Memorial Coliseum, Fort Wayne
- MVP: Jeff Martin
- Attendance: 6,324

The 1994 Continental Basketball Association All-Star Game was the 32nd All-Star Game organised by CBA since its inception in 1949. It was held at the Allen County War Memorial Coliseum in Fort Wayne, Indiana on January 24, 1994, in front of sell-out crowd of 6,324. The American Conference defeated the National Conference 119–108.

Jeff Martin was named the MVP.

Hartford and Sioux Falls were awarded the next two CBA All-Star contests. Hartford would host next year's game on January 24, 1995, and Sioux Falls Skyforce would host the 1996 contest on January 16, 1996.

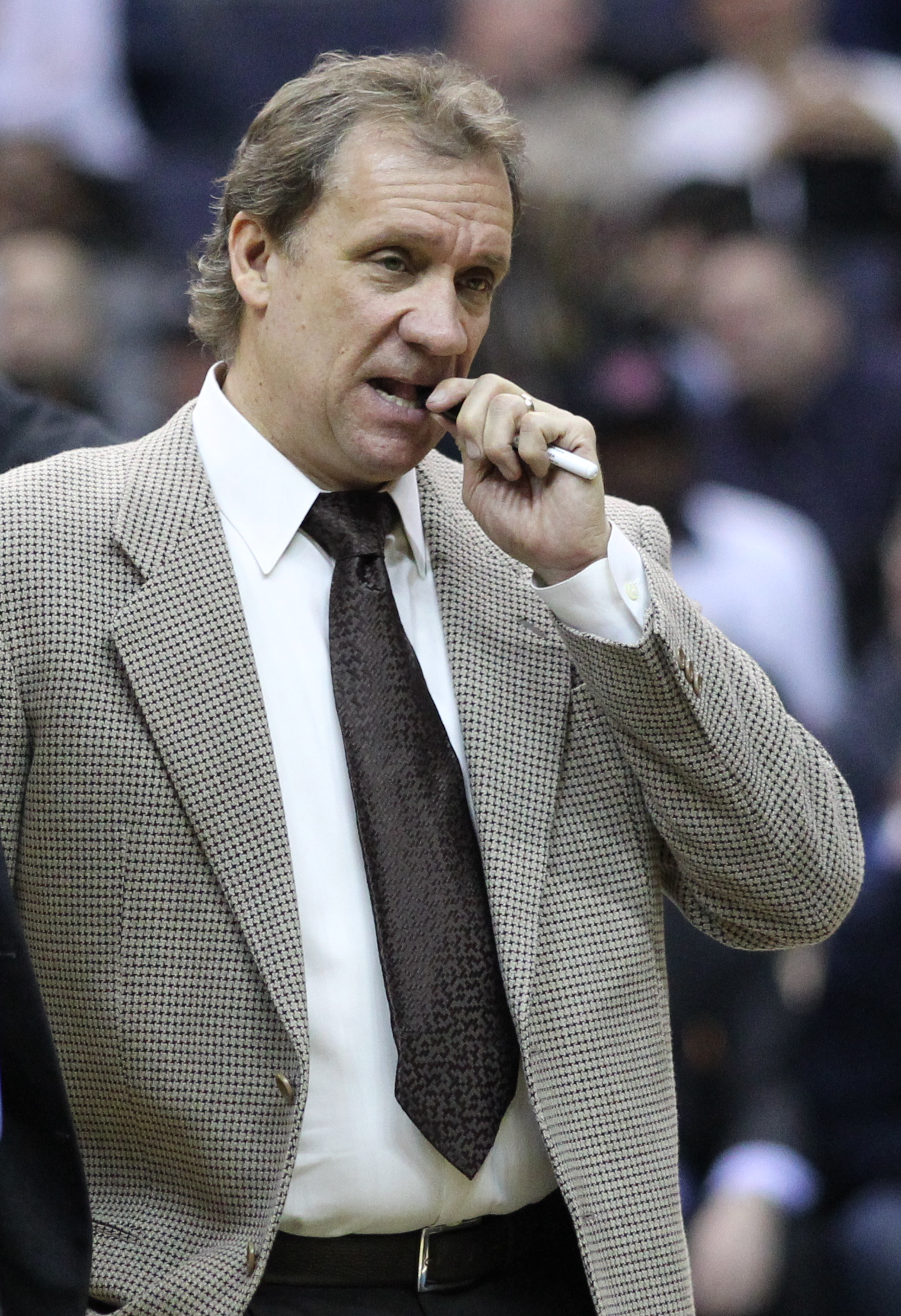
Coach Flip Saunders was selected for the American Conference

== The 1994 CBA All-Star Game events ==
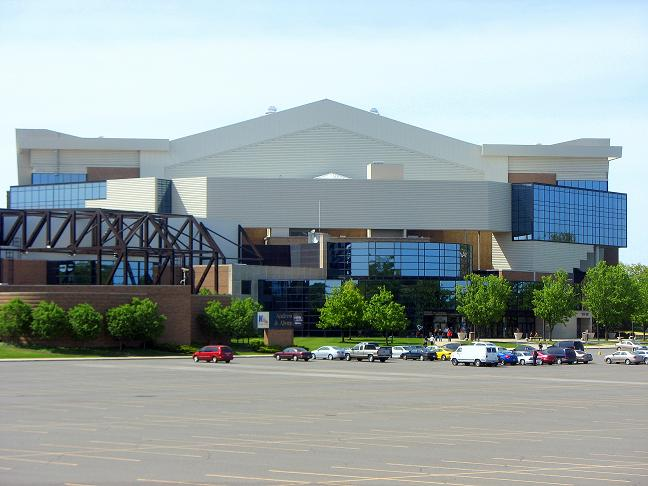
Allen County War Memorial Coliseum

=== CBA Long Distance Shootout ===
Leon Wood of Fargo-Moorhead Fever was the winner.

=== Slum-dunk ===
Myron Brown of Fort Wayne Fury was the winner for the second time in his career.

=== One on one challenge ===
Center Dan Bingenheimer of the Hartford Hellcats won the one-on-one title.

=== The Game ===
Grand Rapids guard Jeff Martin (20 points) was named the MVP. Rapid City's Ben Coleman (17 points) and Fargo-Moorhead forward Roy Marble (16 points) was the top scorer for the National all-stars.

For the first time in its franchise history the Oklahoma City Cavalry did not have a representative in the CBA All-Star Game.

== All-Star teams ==
=== Rosters ===
National Conference
Pos.	Player	Team	Previous appearances
Team
G	(United States) Alphonso Ford	Tri-City Chinook	
G	(United States) Sean Gay	Omaha Racers	
G	(United States) Rod Mason	Omaha Racers	
G	(United States) Leon Wood	Fargo-Moorhead Fever	1990
F	(United States) Roy Marble	Fargo-Moorhead Fever	
F	(United States) Kenny Payne	Tri-City Chinook	
F	(United States) Kelby Stuckey	Sioux Falls Skyforce	
F	(United States) Chuckie White	Wichita Falls	
C	(United States) Ben Coleman	Rapid City Thrillers	
C	(United States) Chad Gallagher	Omaha Racers	
Head coach: (United States) Eric Musselman (Rapid City Thrillers)

American Conference
Pos.	Player	Team	Previous appearances
Team
G	(United States) Harold Ellis	Quad City Thunder	
G	(United States) Jeff Martin	Grand Rapids Hoops	1992
G	(United States) Rodney Monroe	Rochester Renegade	
G	(United States) Clint Wheeler	Rochester Renegade	
F	(United States) Chris Jent	Columbus Horizon	
F	(United States) Reggie Jordan	Grand Rapids Hoops	1993
F	(United States) Jerome Lane	La Crosse Bobcats	
F	(United States) Travis Williams	Fort Wayne Fury	
C	(United States) Dan Bingenheimer	Hartford Hellcats	
C	(United States) Bobby Martin	Quad City Thunder	
Head coach: (United States) Flip Saunders (La Crosse Bobcats)

=== Result ===
Team 1	Score	Team 2
National Conference	108 - 119	American Conference

== Awards ==
MVP	Topscorer	Slam-dunk champion	Long Distance Shootout Winner	One-on-One Winner
(United States) Jeff Martin	(United States) Jeff Martin	(United States) Myron Brown	(United States) Leon Wood	(United States) Dan Bingenheimer

== See also ==
- 1993 CBA All-Star Game
- Continental Basketball Association
