= 2006 CBA All-Star Game =

2006 CBA organised All-Star Game

Eastern Division	Western Division
110	119
- Date: January 17, 2006
- Venue: Qwest Arena, Boise
- MVP: Randy Holcomb

The 2006 Continental Basketball Association All-Star Game was the 40th All-Star Game organised by CBA since its inception in 1949. It was held at the Qwest Arena in Boise, Idaho on January 17, 2006. The Western Division defeated the Eastern Division 119–110.

Randy Holcomb was named the MVP.

The title-sponsor of the 2006 edition was Athletes.com CBA All-Star game. The match was preceded by Slam-Dunk and Long Distance Shootout contests. It was the 22nd annual All-Star Game under the name of the CBA (since 1978).

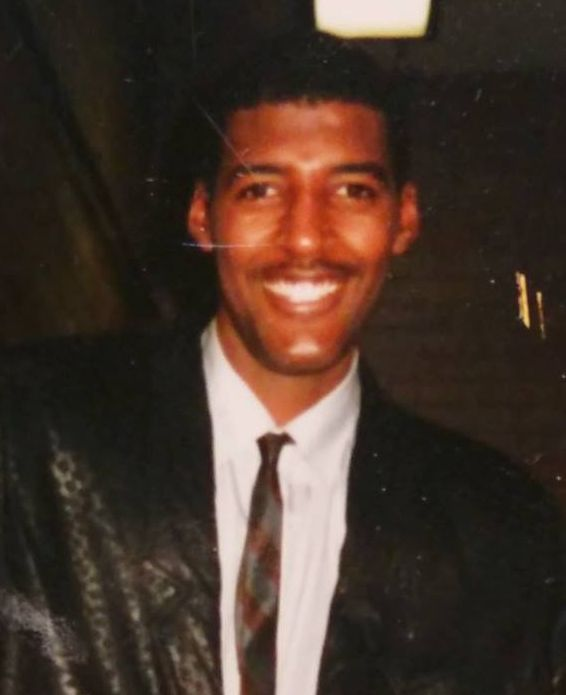
Roy Tarpley was selected, but he was unavailble due to an injury

== The 2006 CBA All-Star Game events ==
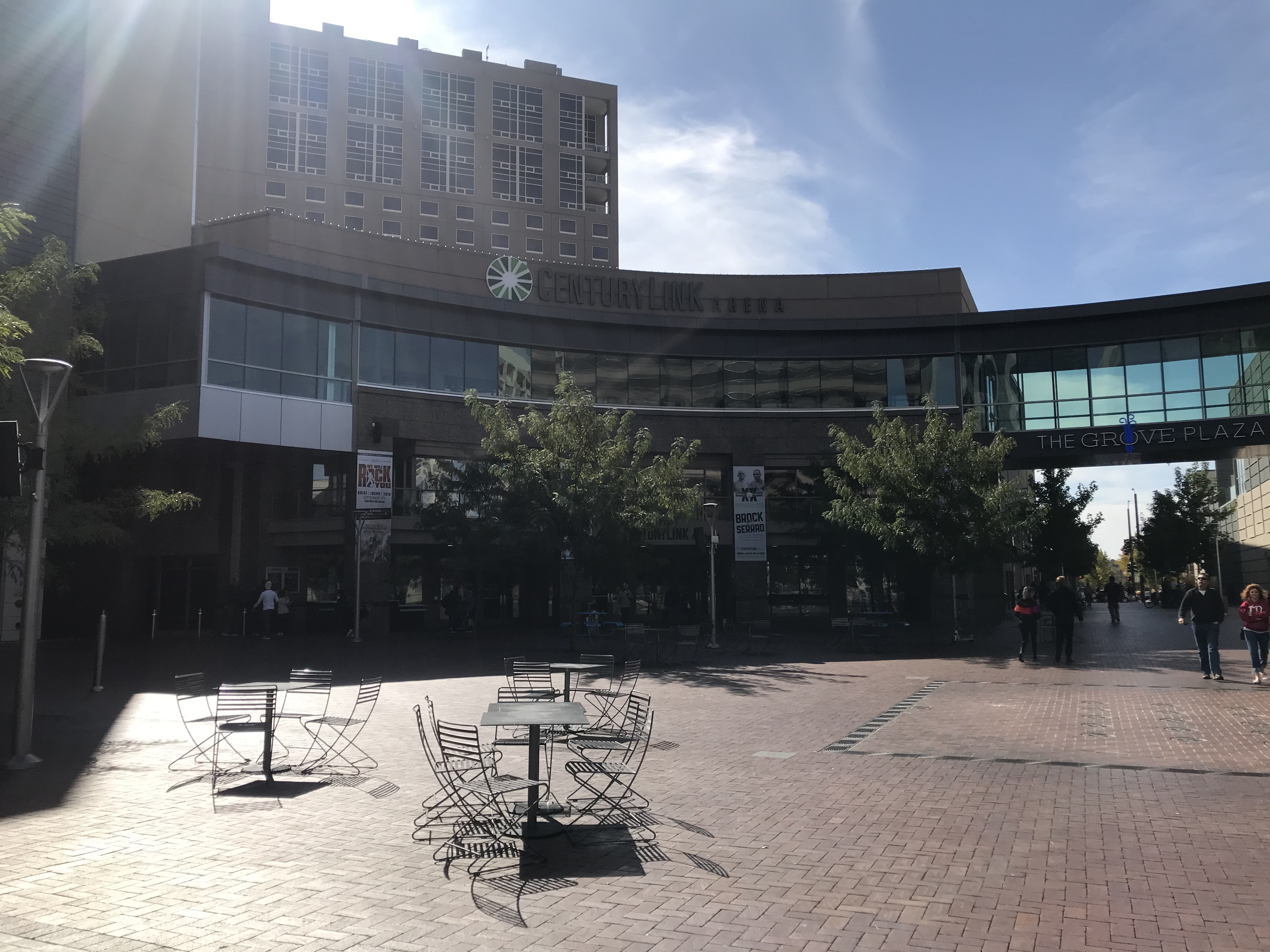
The Qwest Arena

=== CBA Long Distance Shootout ===
David Jackson of Idaho Stampede was the winner. He beat Jimmie Hunter of Gary Steelheads in the final.

=== Slum-dunk ===
Alpha Bangura of Michigan Mayhem was the winner. He received 97 points in the final, beating Jamario Moon of Albany Patroons who failed to make his 2nd slam-dunk and finished with 74 points. The judges were five.

=== The Game ===
David Jackson of Idaho Stampede was the top scorer of the match with 22 pts for the Western Conference while Randy Holcomb of Gary Steelheads was MVP with 20 points and 13 rebounds. James Thomas had 17 pts for the Eastern Conference.

Sioux Falls Skyforce had initially three players named to the Western All-Stars before the replacements: Rodney Buford and Brandon Hunter left to play overseas while Stevie Graham was called up by Chicago Bulls. Michigan Mayhem also had originally two players: Roy Tarpley had been named in the Western All-Stars but he was unable due to an injury and Alpha Bangura was traded to Idaho Stampede.

== All-Star teams ==
=== Rosters ===
Western Conference
Pos.	Player	Team	Points	Previous appearances
Team
G	(United States) Maurice Baker	Dakota Wizards	8 pts	
F	(Libya) (Sierra Leone) Alpha Bangura	Idaho Stampede	15 pts	
G	(United States) Cheyne Gadson	Yakima SunKings	12 pts	
G	(United States) David Jackson	Idaho Stampede	22 pts	
G	(United States) Antwain Barbour	Yakima SunKings	16 pts	
F	(United States) Kasib Powell	Dakota Wizards	16 pts	2005
F	(United States) Leonard White	Yakima SunKings	6 pts	1996, 2004
C	(United States) Noel Felix	Sioux Falls Skyforce	18 pts	
F	(United States) Eric Chenowith	Idaho Stampede	6 pts	
Unavailable
F	(United States) Rodney Buford	Sioux Falls Skyforce		
F	(United States) Brandon Hunter	Sioux Falls Skyforce		
G	(United States) Stevie Graham	Sioux Falls Skyforce		
Head coach:

Eastern Conference
Pos.	Player	Team	Points	Previous appearances
Team
F	(United States) James Thomas	Albany Patroons	17 pts	
G	(United States) Marlon Parmer	Rockford Lightning	10 pts	2005
G	(United States) T.J. Thompson	Albany Patroons	2 pts	
C	(United States) Kenyon Gamble	Rockford Lightning	6 pts	
G	(United States) Jimmie Hunter	Gary Steelheads	15 pts	2004
G	(United States) Ronnie Fields	Rockford Lightning	11 pts	2003, 2004
F	(United States) Carl Mitchell	Albany Patroons	13 pts	
F	(United States) Randy Holcomb	Gary Steelheads	20pts	
F	(United States) Roger Powell	Rockford Lightning	11 pts	
C	(United States) Chris Alexander	Gary Steelheads	5 pts	
Unavailable
C	(United States) Roy Tarpley	Michigan Mayhem		2004
Head coach:

=== Result ===
Team 1	Score	Team 2
Western Conference	119 - 110	Eastern Conference

== Awards ==
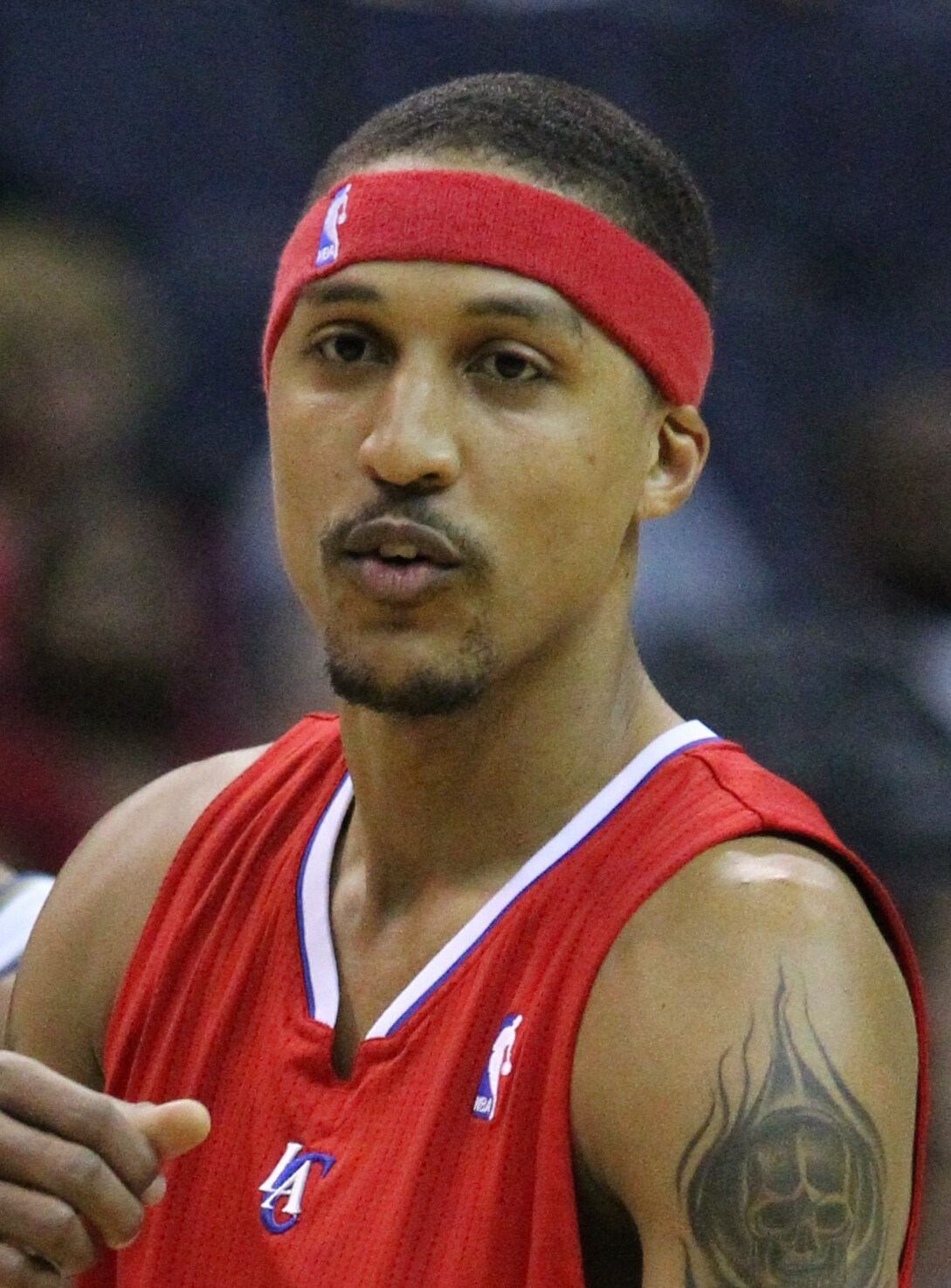
Jamario Moon played in the Slam-dunk final

MVP	Topscorer	Slam-dunk champion	Long Distance Shootout Winner
(United States) Randy Holcomb	(United States) David Jackson	(Libya) (Sierra Leone) Alpha Bangura	(United States) David Jackson

== See also ==
- 2005 CBA All-Star Game
- Continental Basketball Association

== Sources ==
- HISTORY OF THE CBA ALL STAR GAME
