= 1995 CBA All-Star Game =

American Conference	National Conference
115	119
- Date: January 24, 1995
- Venue: Hartford Civic Arena, Hartford
- MVP: Kendrick Warren
- Attendance: 10,039

The 1995 Continental Basketball Association All-Star Game was the 33d All-Star Game organised by CBA since its inception in 1949. It was held at the Hartford Civic Arena in Hartford, Connecticut on January 24, 1995, in front of 10,039 spectators. The National Conference defeated the American Conference 119-115.

Kendrick Warren who later was named the Rookie of the Year, was the only rookie chosen.

Tony Dawson was named the MVP.

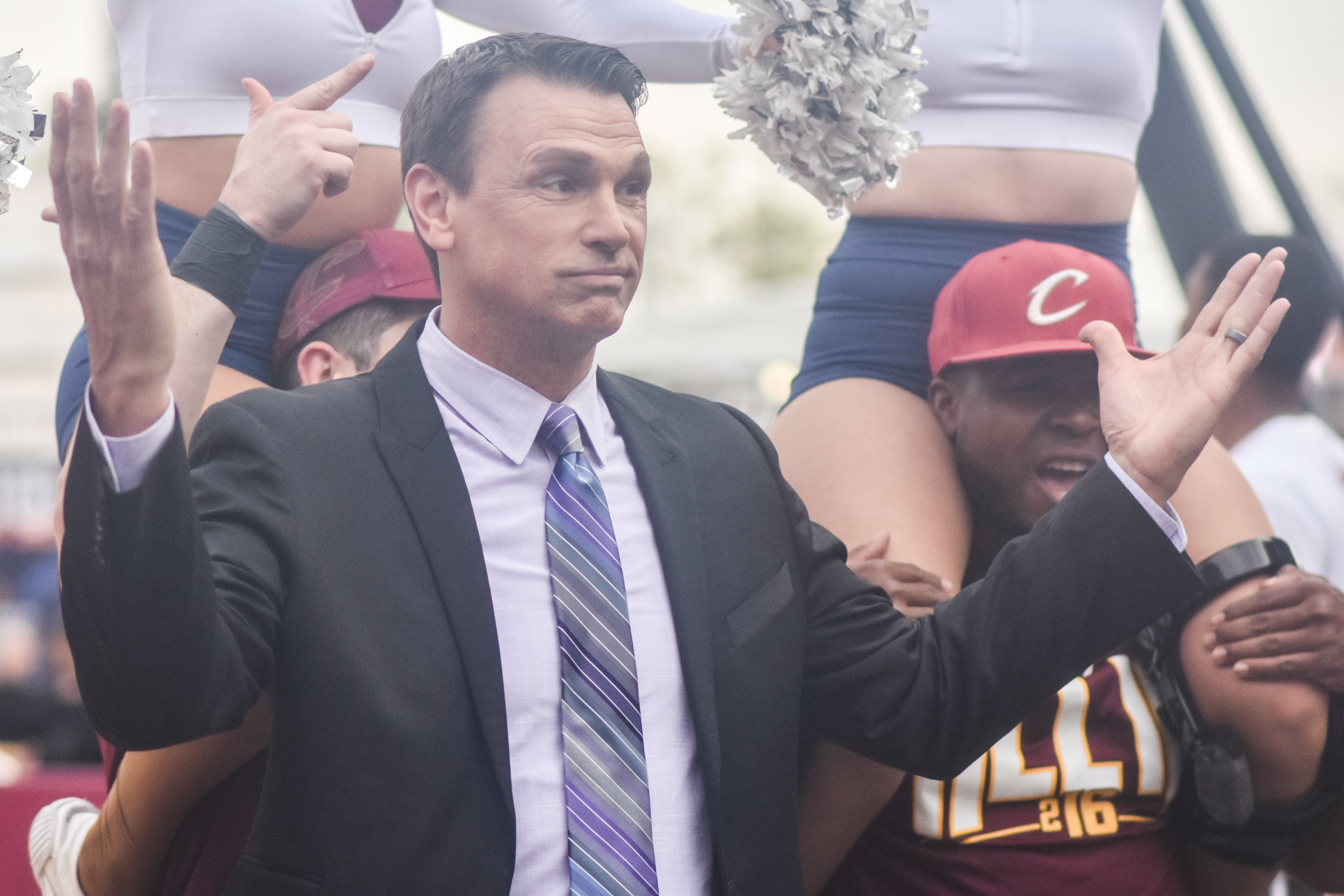
Tim Legler played a record four CBA All-Star Games

== The 1995 CBA All-Star Game events ==
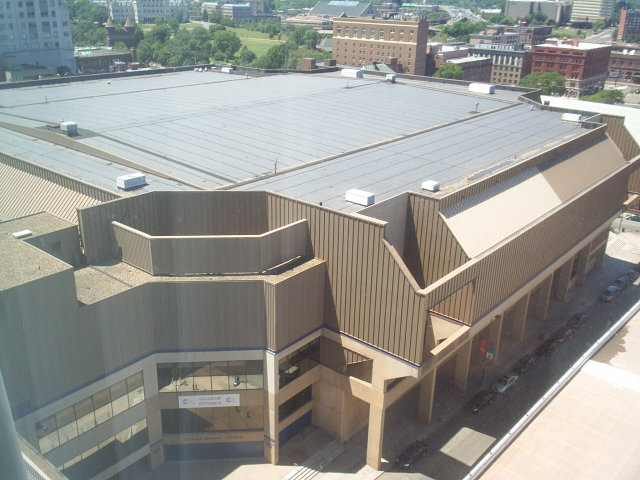
Aerial view of the Hartford Civic Arena exterior.

=== CBA Long Distance Shootout ===
Charles Smith of Hartford Hellcats was the winner.

=== Slum-dunk ===
Terry Ross of Tri-City Chinook was the winner.

=== One-on-One challenge ===
Alphonso Ford played Chucky Brown in the final.

=== The Game ===
Tony Dawson was the top scorer of the match with 25 points for the National Conference, while teammates Henry James had 17 and Darrick Martin scored 12.

== All-Star teams ==
=== Rosters ===
National Conference
Pos.	Player	Team	Previous appearances
Team
G	(United States) Alphonso Ford	Tri-City Chinook	1994
G	(United States) Tim Legler	Omaha Racers	1990, 1992, 1993
G	(United States) Darrick Martin	Sioux Falls Skyforce	
G	(United States) Eldridge Recasner	Yakima Sun Kings	
F	(United States) Sebastian Neal	Omaha Racers	
F	(United States) George McCloud	Rapid City Thrillers	
C	(United States) Jerome Lane	Oklahoma City Cavalry	1994
F	(United States) Henry James	Sioux Falls Skyforce	1993
F	(United States) Tony Dawson	Rockford Lightning	
C	(United States) Adrian Caldwell	Sioux Falls Skyforce	
F	(United States) Chucky Brown	Yakima Sun Kings	
Head coach: (United States) Flip Saunders (Sioux Falls Skyforce)

American Conference
Pos.	Player	Team	Previous appearances
Team
G	(United States) Charles Smith	Hartford Hellcats	
F	(United States) Kevin Pritchard	Quad City Thunder	
C	(United States) Richard Manning	Quad City Thunder	
F	(United States) Bill Jones	Quad City Thunder	1990
G	(United States) Jerome Harmon	Fort Wayne Fury	
G	(United States) Tate George	Quad City Thunder	
F	(United States) Marques Bragg	Grand Rapids Mackers	
F	(United States) Kendrick Warren	Rockford Lightning	
C	(United States) Yamen Sanders	Grand Rapids Mackers	
C	(United States) Earl Jones	Rockford Lightning	
Head coach: (United States) Dan Panaggio (Quad City Thunder)

=== Result ===
Team 1	Score	Team 2
National Conference	119 - 115	American Conference

== Awards ==
MVP	Topscorer	Slam-dunk champion	Long Distance Shootout Winner
(United States) Tony Dawson	(United States) Tony Dawson	(United States) Terry Ross	(United States) Charles Smith

== See also ==
- 1996 CBA All-Star Game
- Continental Basketball Association
