= 1988 CBA All-Star Game (January) =

1988 CBA organised All-Star Game

CBA All-Stars	Topeka Sizzlers
97	103
- Date: January 20, 1988
- Venue: Landon Arena, Topeka
- MVP: Michael Brooks
- Attendance: 7,040
- Network: ESPN

The 1988 Continental Basketball Association All-Star Game was the 26th All-Star Game organised by the league since its inception in 1949 and the 8th under the name of CBA. It was held at the Landon Arena in Topeka, Kansas on January 20, 1988, in front of 7,040 speactators. The hosts Topeka Sizzlers were defeated by the CBA All-Stars 94–115.

Michael Brooks of Albany Patroons was named the MVP.

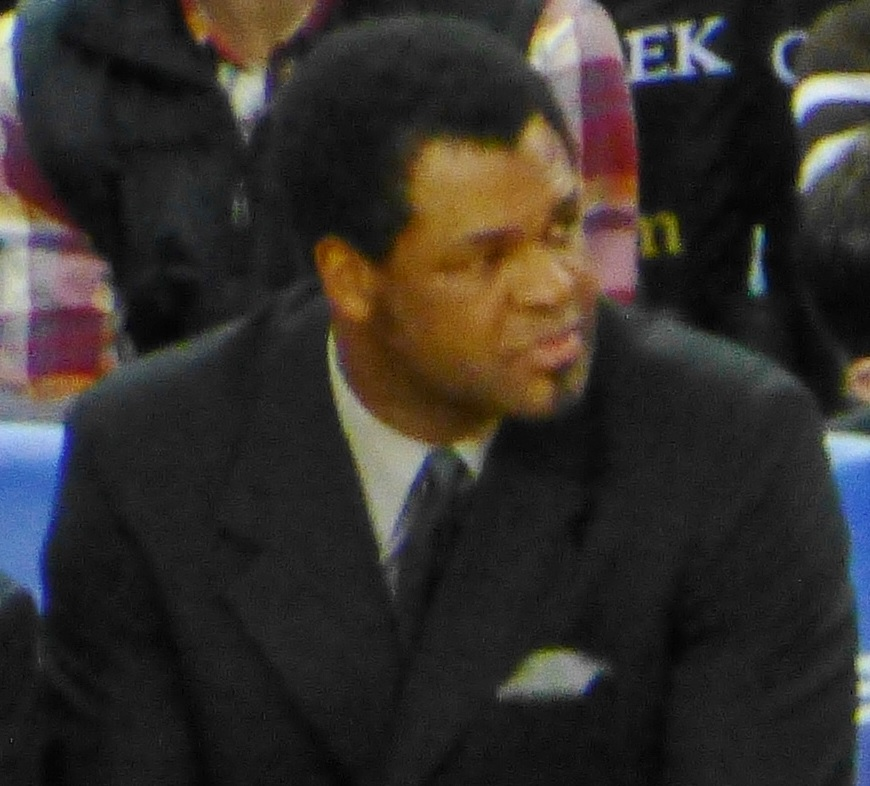
Pete Myers was voted to be a starter for the CBA All-Stars

== The 1988 CBA All-Star Game ==
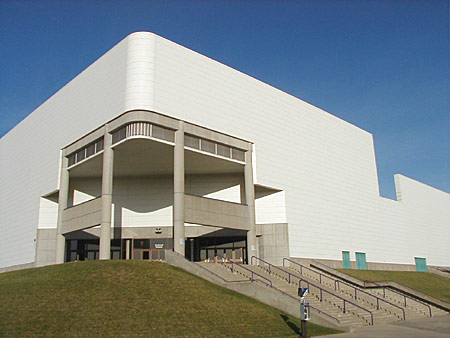
The Landon Arena

=== Slun-dunk contest ===
Jamie Waller of Quad City Thunder was the winner.

=== The Game ===
CBA All-Stars had an easy win. Jerome Batiste of the Topeka Sizzlers was the top scorer of the match with 21pts.

The biggest name for of Topeka Sizzlers was 41-year old Jo Jo White, a 7-time NBA All-Star with the Boston Celtics with his last professional game being in 1981 with Kansas City Kings, but he retired after 26 days upon his return, in December 1987, and he did not feature in the All-Star Game.

== All-Star teams ==
=== Rosters ===
Topeka Sizzlers
Pos.	Player	Previous Appearances
Team
F	(United States) John Harris	
G	(United States) Cedric Hunter	
F	(United States) Andrew Kennedy	
F	(United States) Jerome Batiste	
F	(United States) Lloyd Daniels	
G	(United States) Chip Engelland	
F	(United States) Calvin Thompson	
G	(United States) (Republic of Ireland) Ron Rowan	
G	(United States) Bill Martin	
C	(United States) Chris Burke	
Head coach: (United States) John Killilea

CBA All-Stars
Pos.	Player	Team	Previous appearances
Starters
F	(United States) Michael Brooks	Albany Patroons	
F	(United States) Pete Myers	Rockford Lightning	
G	(United States) Kelvin Upshaw	Rapid City Thrillers	
G	(United States) Ricky Wilson	Mississippi Jets	
C	(United States) Brad Wright	Wyoming Wildcatters	
Reserves
G	(United States) Sidney Lowe	Albany Patroons	
G	(United States) Ray Hall	Charleston Gunners	
F	(United States) Tom Davis	Pensacola Tornados	
C	(United States) Eddie Lee Wilkins	Savannah Spirits	
F	(United States) David Thirdkill	Rochester Renegade	
F	(United States) Jamie Waller	Quad City Thunder	
C	(United States) Claude Gregory	La Crosse Catbirds	
Alternates
Head coach: Bill Musselman (Albany Patroons)

=== Result ===
Team 1	Score	Team 2
CBA All-Stars	115 - 94	Topeka Sizzlers

== Awards ==
MVP	Topscorer	Slam-Dunk champion
(United States) Michael Brooks	(United States) Jerome Batiste	(United States) Jamie Waller

== See also ==
- 1987 CBA All-Star Game
- Continental Basketball Association

== Sources ==
- HISTORY OF THE CBA ALL STAR GAME
- Topeka Sizzlers
