= Birmingham Bandits =

American basketball team

- Conference: American
- Division: Eastern (1991–92)
- League: CBA
- Established: 1991
- Folded: 1992
- Arena: Bill Harris Arena
- Capacity: 5,000
- Location: Birmingham, Alabama
- Team colors: white, green
- Ownership: Tom and Jane McMillan

The Birmingham Bandits were a professional basketball team based in Birmingham, Alabama. They played 1 season in the Continental Basketball Association (CBA), the defunct development league for the National Basketball Association (NBA).

== History ==
In April 1991, the owner of the Pensacola Tornados, Tom McMillan announced his intention to relocate the team, citing poor attendance. After considering Knoxville, Tennessee and Huntsville, Alabama, McMillan ultimately decided to move the team to Birmingham, Alabama, officially announcing it in May 1991. The team was affiliated with two NBA franchises, the Atlanta Hawks and the San Antonio Spurs, and Morris McHone was named head coach, replacing former Tornados coach Fred Bryan. With their first pick in the 1991 CBA draft (8th overall), which took place in Denver, Colorado, the Bandits selected Melvin Cheatum, a former player of the Alabama Crimson Tide. Their other draft picks were Tank Collins from New Orleans, Corey Crowder from Kentucky Wesleyan, Emmitt Smith from Georgia Southern, Ron Moye from Hartford and Chris Collier from Georgia State; the Bandits traded Tank Collins' rights to the Tri-City Chinook in exchange for Michael Ansley.

The Bandits were included in the Eastern Division of the American Conference with the Albany Patroons, the Columbus Horizon and the Grand Rapids Hoops. The team played their first game against the Quad City Thunder on November 8, 1991, losing 118–114. The Bandits recorded a 6-game winning streak between November 15 and November 27, before losing to the Tri-City Chinook on November 28: they then lost 7 consecutive games. During the season two players were called up by NBA teams: Ansley by the Philadelphia 76ers and Dave Popson by the Milwaukee Bucks. The Bandits ended the season with a 25–31 record, good for the second place in the Eastern Division, which qualified them for the playoffs. After winning the first round against the Albany Patroons in a single elimination game, the team advanced to the second round, where they lost to the Quad City Thunder 3–1 in the series.

The team recorded the worst attendance of the CBA, and owner McMillan announced that the Kahler Corporation had acquired the franchise on May 28, 1992: the team was relocated to Rochester, Minnesota and became the Rochester Renegade.

== Season-by-season records ==
Years	Wins	Losses	Winning percentage	Head coach(s)	Ref
1991–92	25	31	.446	Morris McHone	

== All-time roster ==
- Marvin Alexander
- Leonard Allen
- Michael Ansley
- Chris Collier
- Michael Cutright
- William DeVaughn
- Jim Farmer
- Mike Goodson
- Skeeter Henry
- Richard Hollis
- Anthony Houston
- Larry Houzer
- Elfrem Jackson
- Eric Johnson
- Eugene McDowell
- Dave Popson
- Rob Robbins
- Emmett Smith
- Irving Thomas
- Mark Wade
- Earl Warren
- Robert Youngblood
