= Ronnie Fields =

American basketball player (born 1977)

Personal information
- Born: February 28, 1977 (age 49) Chicago, Illinois, U.S.
- Listed height: 6 ft 3 in (1.91 m)
- Listed weight: 198 lb (90 kg)

Career information
- High school: Farragut Academy (Chicago, Illinois)
- NBA draft: 1998: undrafted
- Playing career: 1996–2012
- Position: Shooting guard

Career history
- 1996–1997: Rockford Lightning
- 1997–1998: La Crosse Bobcats
- 1998–1999: Rockford Lightning
- 1999–2000: Pennsylvania Valley Dawgs
- 1999: Tanduay Rhum Masters
- 2000: Grand Rapids Hoops
- 2000–2002: Chicago Skyliners
- 2001–2002: Florida Sea Dragons
- 2002–2005: Rockford Lightning
- 2003: Guaros de Lara
- 2003: PAOK Thessaloniki
- 2003–2004: Pennsylvania Valley Dawgs
- 2004–2006: Trotamundos de Carabobo
- 2004: Delfines de Miranda
- 2005: Pinar Karsiyaka SK Izmir
- 2006: Blue Stars
- 2007: Minot Skyrockets
- 2007: Guaros de Lara

Career highlights
- 3× CBA All-Star (2003, 2004, 2006); 3× All-CBA First Team (2003, 2004, 2008); All-CBA Second Team (2006); CBA All-Defensive Team (2008); CBA All-Rookie Second Team (1997); 2× CBA scoring champion (2003, 2004); 4× CBA steals leader (2003, 2004, 2006, 2008); McDonald's All-American (1996); Illinois Mr. Basketball (1996); First-team Parade All-American (1996); 2× Third-team Parade All-American (1994, 1995)

Ronnie Fields (born February 28, 1977) is an American former professional basketball player.

== High school ==
Born and raised in Chicago, Fields played at Farragut Academy in Chicago from 1992–1996 and was a teammate of Kevin Garnett during the 1994 season. Fields had a (reported) 50-inch vertical leap. ESPN HS regarded him as the best freshman in the country for the 1992–93 season. He was a 3-time Parade All American selection (1994–96). He was also the first sophomore to ever play in the "Best of the Best" game at the Nike All American camp in 1993, a game that featured future NBA MVPs Allen Iverson and Kevin Garnett, and High School Player of the Year award winners Ron Mercer and Jerod Ward.

After Garnett was drafted in 1995, Fields, in his senior year, led his squad to an 11–1 record in the Chicago Public League with per-game averages of 32.4 points, 12.2 rebounds, 5.1 assists, 4.5 blocks, 4 steals, and 4.5 dunks a game. He became a consensus First Team All American (Parade, USA Today, McDonald's), putting him in the company of future NBA players Mike Bibby, Jermaine O'Neal, Tim Thomas, and Kobe Bryant.

Fields broke his neck in a car accident on February 26, 1996, one week before the city playoffs. After undergoing surgery to repair a fractured bone in his neck, he had to wear a protective halo while healing. He left high school as the third all-time leading scorer in Chicago Public League history with 2,619 points. His high school teammates included Willie Farley (94), Kevin Garnett (95) and Michael Wright (98).

After being recruited by Joey Meyer, Fields signed a letter of intent at DePaul University in his hometown but was later ruled academically ineligible and denied admission. A few months later, Fields pleaded guilty to a misdemeanor charge of sexual abuse, which led to probation.

== Professional career ==
Fields declared himself eligible for the 1996 CBA Draft and was selected in the 7th round (73rd overall) by the LaCrosse Bobcats. He played for the Rockford Lightning of the CBA during the 1996–97 season and was selected to the CBA All-Rookie Second Team. He also declared for the 1997 NBA draft but later withdrew his name. Fields was eligible for the 1998 NBA draft but went undrafted.

Fields also suited up as an import in the Philippine Basketball Association for the Tanduay Rhum Masters. He has also played in Venezuela, Turkey, Lebanon, Dominican Republic, Puerto Rico, and Greece. Fields also played in the ABA, reuniting with Joey Meyer in the 2000–2001 season with the Chicago Skyliners. He also spent four seasons with the Rockford Lightning as the team' starting guard. In November 2008, Fields returned to play basketball in the CBA for the Minot SkyRockets, signing as the starting shooting guard. The 32-year-old Fields averaged 21.4 points, 4.9 assists, and a league-leading 2.7 steals a game in his last full season.

== Player profile ==
Ronnie Fields was known to be a strong scorer near the basket, but although he had improved other parts of the game over time, such as passing, court vision, and defence, he continued to struggle with outside shooting. His CBA career exploits include leading the league in steals several times, being the only player in the history of the CBA to lead the league in both scoring and steals in two consecutive seasons, back-to-back scoring championships, and ranking sixth all-time with over 6,000 career points.

Fields was named to the All-CBA First Team in 2003, 2004 and 2008, and the Second Team in 2006. He was selected to the All-Defensive Team in 2008.

== Personal life ==
While in eighth grade, he worked at the Taste of Chicago passing out pizzas for the well-known pizzeria Lou Malnati's. Fields mentored and trained youth at Farragut Academy after his professional playing career ended. He also gave talks as a motivational speaker.

As of 2023, he is the founder and coach of Ronnie Fields Elite, which organizes basketball programs for middle and high school students. Additionally, he is the head boys' varsity basketball coach at Chicago Hope Academy, a Christian high school in Chicago. Fields is also the head basketball trainer at the Life Time gym in Oak Brook, Illinois.

Fields is the subject of the documentary, Bounce Back: the Ronnie Fields Story. He is also one of two guests on Episode 22 of KG Certified, entitled The Farragut Reunion W/ Ronnie Fields & Coach Wolf Nelson (2022), hosted by Kevin Garnett.

He lives in Westmont, Illinois and has a daughter named Lisa.

Awards and achievements
Preceded by Kevin Garnett	Illinois Mr. Basketball Award Winner; 1996	Succeeded by Sergio McClain
