= Tony Dawson =

American basketball player (born 1967)

Personal information
- Born: August 25, 1967 (age 59) Kinston, North Carolina, U.S.
- Listed height: 6 ft 7 in (2.01 m)
- Listed weight: 220 lb (100 kg)

Career information
- High school: Kinston (Kinston, North Carolina)
- College: Gulf Coast CC (1985–1987); Florida State (1987–1989)
- NBA draft: 1989: undrafted
- Playing career: 1989–2003
- Position: Small forward
- Number: 32, 45

Career history
- 1989–1990: Pensacola Tornados
- 1990: Tenerife
- 1990: Aurora Desio
- 1990–1991: Pensacola Tornados
- 1991: Sacramento Kings
- 1991–1992: Beitar Tel Aviv
- 1992–1993: Rapid City Thrillers
- 1993: Pallacanestro Ferrara
- 1993: Cholet Basket
- 1993–1994: Joventut Badalona
- 1994–1995: Rapid City Thrillers
- 1995: Rockford Lightning
- 1995: Boston Celtics
- 1995–1997: TSV 04 Leverkusen
- 1997–1998: Apollon Patras
- 1998–1999: Scavolini Pesaro
- 1999: Dafni Athens
- 2000–2001: Al Riyadi Beirut
- 2001–2002: Ionikos N.F.
- 2002–2003: Cocodrilos de Caracas

Career highlights
- Greek League Top Scorer (1998); German League Top Scorer (1996); Spanish League Top Scorer (1991); CBA All-Star Game MVP (1995); 2× All-CBA First Team (1991, 1995)
- Stats at NBA.com
- Stats at Basketball Reference

Antonio Ray Dawson (born August 25, 1967) is a retired American professional basketball player who played briefly in the National Basketball Association (NBA), among other leagues. At a height of 6 ft 7 in (2.01 m) tall, and a weight of 220 lb (100 kg), he played at the small forward position.

== High school ==
Dawson was born in Kinston, North Carolina, and he attended Kinston High School.

== College career ==
Dawson played college basketball at Gulf Coast Community College, and at Florida State University, with the Florida State Seminoles.

== Professional career ==
Dawson played a handful of NBA games during the 1990s. Dawson was signed to a 10-day contract by the Sacramento Kings on March 7, 1991. He played in 4 NBA games with them, averaging 2.3 points and 0.5 rebounds per game.

On January 25, 1995, as a member of the CBA's Rockford Lightning, he was named the Most Valuable Player of the CBA All-Star Game, which was held at Hartford Civic Center, in Hartford, Connecticut, after he scored 26 points. Dawson was selected to the All-CBA First Team in 1991 and 1995.

He was signed to a 10-day contract by the Boston Celtics on March 28, 1995, but he did not play in an NBA game for them. He was signed to a second contract on April 7, and then played in 2 NBA games for them, averaging four points and 1.5 rebounds per game. Dawson also played professionally in Spain, Israel, France, Germany, Greece, Lebanon, and Venezuela.

== Personal life ==
Dawson is the older brother of NBA player Jerry Stackhouse, and the uncle of former Wake Forest University guard Craig Dawson.
