= Randy Holcomb =

Libyan basketball player

Personal information
- Born: August 8, 1979 (age 47) Chicago, Illinois, U.S.
- Listed height: 6 ft 8 in (2.03 m)
- Listed weight: 225 lb (102 kg)

Career information
- High school: Lincoln Park (Chicago, Illinois)
- College: Fresno State (1998–1999); Los Angeles CC (1999–2000); San Diego State (2000–2002)
- NBA draft: 2002: 2nd round, 57th overall pick
- Drafted by: San Antonio Spurs
- Playing career: 2002–2011
- Position: Forward
- Number: 6

Career history
- 2002: Śląsk Wrocław
- 2002–2003: Talk 'n Text Phone Pals
- 2004: Fresno Heatwave
- 2004: Talk 'n Text Phone Pals
- 2004: Visalia Dawgs
- 2004: Apollon Patras
- 2005: Cocodrilos de Caracas
- 2005–2006: Gary Steelheads
- 2006: Chicago Bulls
- 2006: Gary Steelheads
- 2006: DKV Joventut
- 2006–2007: Toshiba Brave Thunders Kanagawa
- 2007: Atléticos de San Germán
- 2007–2008: Toshiba Brave Thunders Kanagawa
- 2008: Alaska Aces
- 2008–2009: Al-Wasl
- 2009–2010: Cáceres
- 2010: Toros de Aragua
- 2010–2011: Link Tochigi Brex

Career highlights
- CBA All-Star Game (2006); CBA All-Star Game MVP (2006); All-CBA Second Team (2006); CBA All-Defensive Team (2006)
- Stats at NBA.com
- Stats at Basketball Reference

Randy Alfred Holcomb Jr. (born August 8, 1979), also known as Raed Farid Elhamali, is an American-Libyan businessman and former professional basketball player. After being drafted by the San Antonio Spurs in the 2002 NBA draft, Holcomb went on to play nine years professionally. He also played for Libya in international competitions.

== Business career ==
Holcomb founded Alfred's House, a luxury leather goods fashion house inspired by vintage Americana sport. Holcomb also works on urban development projects that bring national retailers to areas that are blighted.

In 2017, Holcomb started The Run Sports, a media company geared around giving young athletes exposure. In 2018, Holcomb started RUN BC, a sports training & AAU team program.

== Basketball career ==
Holcomb graduated from Lincoln Park High School, where he received All-City and All-State honors. Holcomb attended Fresno State before transferring to San Diego State. Holcomb was named the conference tournament MVP and first team all conference. He was also their first player to be selected in the NBA draft since Michael Cage, being taken by the San Antonio Spurs in the 2nd round (57th pick) of the 2002 NBA draft.

After being drafted his draft rights were traded to the Philadelphia 76ers with Mark Bryant and John Salmons in exchange for Speedy Claxton, on June 26, 2002. Holcomb signed a 10-day contract with the Chicago Bulls on January 5, 2006, and appeared in four games during that season. This ended up being Holcomb's only playing time in the NBA as his final game ever in the league was the 4th game he played with Chicago on January 14, 2006. On that day, Chicago would lose a game 89–91 to the Indiana Pacers where Holcomb only played for 70 seconds (substituting at the end of the 2nd quarter for Luol Deng) and recorded 1 rebound.

Holcomb played for the Gary Steelheads of the Continental Basketball Association (CBA) during the 2005–06 season. He was selected as an All-Star and earned All-Star Game Most Valuable Player honors. Holcomb was named to the All-CBA Second Team and All-Defensive Team.

Holcomb played with the Libya national basketball team in 2009 under the name Raed Farid Elhamali. In a celebrated game, Libya beat their adversary, Egypt 75–73.
