= Pat Durham =

American basketball player (born 1967)

Personal information
- Born: March 10, 1967 (age 59) Dallas, Texas, U.S.
- Listed height: 6 ft 7 in (2.01 m)
- Listed weight: 210 lb (95 kg)

Career information
- High school: Wilmer-Hutchins (Dallas, Texas)
- College: Colorado State (1985–1989)
- NBA draft: 1989: 2nd round, 35th overall pick
- Drafted by: Dallas Mavericks
- Playing career: 1989–2006
- Position: Small forward
- Number: 20, 30

Career history
- 1989–1990: Rapid City Thrillers
- 1990: Caja San Fernando
- 1990–1991: Cedar Rapids Silver Bullets
- 1991–1992: Pallacanestro Bellinzona
- 1992: Olimpia Venado Tuerto
- 1992: La Crosse Catbirds
- 1992–1993: Fargo-Moorhead Fever
- 1993: Golden State Warriors
- 1993: San Miguel Beermen
- 1993: Olimpia Venado Tuerto
- 1993–1994: Saski Baskonia
- 1994: Pau-Orthez
- 1994: Rapid City Thrillers
- 1994–1995: Minnesota Timberwolves
- 1995–1998: SLUC Nancy
- 1998–1999: Galatasaray
- 1999–2001: SLUC Nancy
- 2001: Pamesa Valencia
- 2001–2002: Apollon Patras
- 2002: ALM Évreux
- 2002–2006: STB Le Havre

Career highlights
- CBA All-Star (1991, 1993); CBA All-Star Game MVP (1993); All-CBA Second Team (1993); 2× First-team All-WAC (1988, 1989)
- Stats at NBA.com
- Stats at Basketball Reference

Patrick Wayne Durham (born March 10, 1967) is a retired American professional basketball player who played in the National Basketball Association (NBA) and several other top professional leagues. He was selected by the Dallas Mavericks in the second round (35th pick overall) of the 1989 NBA draft.

Durham played two years in the NBA for the Golden State Warriors and Minnesota Timberwolves. His best year as a pro came during the 1994–95 season as a member of the Timberwolves, appearing in 59 games and averaging 5.1 ppg. Durham played collegiately at Colorado State University.

Durham also played professionally in the Philippines and Europe. In 1997, he was with Nancy, and he played for STB Le Havre in France for the 2005–06 season.

Durham played in the Continental Basketball Association (CBA) for the Rapid City Thrillers, Cedar Rapids Silver Bullets, Fargo-Moorhead Fever and La Crosse Catbirds from 1989 to 1995. He was selected as the CBA All-Star Game Most Valuable Player and named to the All-CBA Second Team in 1993.

His net worth is an estimated $17,975.00, as reported by Calvin Watkins, of The Dallas Morning News.
