= Duane Washington =

American basketball player (born 1964)

Personal information
- Born: August 31, 1964 (age 62) Eschwege, West Germany
- Listed height: 6 ft 4 in (1.93 m)
- Listed weight: 195 lb (88 kg)

Career information
- High school: Parkview Arts and Science Magnet (Little Rock, Arkansas)
- College: Laredo (1983–1985); Middle Tennessee (1985–1987)
- NBA draft: 1987: 2nd round, 36th overall pick
- Drafted by: Washington Bullets
- Playing career: 1987–2000
- Position: Shooting guard
- Number: 14, 10, 7, 4

Career history
- 1987–1988: Rapid City Thrillers
- 1988: New Jersey Nets
- 1988: New Haven Skyhawks
- 1988–1990: Tulsa Fast Breakers
- 1990–1992: Columbus Horizon
- 1992: Miami Tropics
- 1992–1993: Rockford Lightning
- 1993: Los Angeles Clippers
- 1993: Rockford Lightning
- 1993: Miami Tropics
- 1993–1994: Rapid City Thrillers
- 1994: Grand Rapids Hoops
- 1994: BG Bramsche/Osnabrück
- 1994: Le Mans Sarthe
- 1994: Grand Rapids Mackers
- 1994–1995: Trotamundos de Carabobo
- 1995: Sabios de Manizales
- 1995–1996: Murcia
- 1996: Trotamundos de Carabobo
- 1996–1997: Murcia
- 1997: Granada
- 1998: Grand Rapids Hoops
- 1998: Panteras de Miranda
- 1998: Maccabi Rishon LeZion
- 1998–1999: Dragons Rhöndorf
- 1999–2000: Skyliners Frankfurt

Career highlights
- CBA champion (1989); USBL Playoffs MVP (1992)
- Stats at NBA.com
- Stats at Basketball Reference

Duane Eddy Washington Sr. (born August 31, 1964) is an American former professional basketball player who played in the National Basketball Association (NBA) and in other professional basketball leagues.

== College career ==
Washington played basketball at Laredo College from 1983 to 1985 and Middle Tennessee State University from 1985 to 1987.

== Professional career ==
Washington was chosen in the second round of the 1987 NBA draft by the Washington Bullets. The Bullets selected him with the 36th overall pick in the draft. Washington's brief NBA career consisted of 19 games; he played for the New Jersey Nets and the Los Angeles Clippers.

In 1988, Washington was suspended for two years for violating the league's substance-abuse agreement by using cocaine.

Washington won a Continental Basketball Association (CBA) championship with the Tulsa Fast Breakers in 1989.

Washington also played professionally overseas with stints in France, Spain, Colombia, Venezuela, Israel and Germany.

== Legal issues ==
On September 19, 2012, Washington was charged with failing to stop at the scene of an accident causing injury, after hitting a 70-year-old woman with his car on September 18, then leaving. The accident occurred along I-96 in Crockery Township, Michigan, near Spring Lake. In July 2013, Washington was sentenced to sixty days in jail. He was also placed under probation for eighteen months and ordered to perform community service.

== Personal life ==
Washington is the older brother of basketball coach and former player Derek Fisher and the father of professional basketball player Duane Washington Jr.

== Career statistics ==
Legend
| GP | Games played | GS | Games started | MPG | Minutes per game |
| FG% | Field goal percentage | 3P% | 3-point field goal percentage | FT% | Free throw percentage |
| RPG | Rebounds per game | APG | Assists per game | SPG | Steals per game |
| BPG | Blocks per game | PPG | Points per game | **Bold** | Career high |

=== NBA ===
==== Regular season ====
| Year | Team | GP | GS | MPG | FG% | 3P% | FT% | RPG | APG | SPG | BPG | PPG |
|---|---|---|---|---|---|---|---|---|---|---|---|---|
| 1987–88 | New Jersey | **15** | 0 | **10.4** | **.429** | **.500** | **.800** | **1.5** | **2.3** | **.8** | .0 | **3.6** |
| 1992–93 | L.A. Clippers | 4 | 0 | 7.0 | .000 | – | – | .5 | 1.3 | .3 | .0 | .0 |
| Career | | 19 | 0 | 9.7 | .383 | .500 | .800 | 1.3 | 2.1 | .7 | .0 | 2.8 |

== See also ==
- List of people banned or suspended by the NBA
- List of second-generation NBA players
