= Pensacola Tornados =

- League: CBA
- Established: 1985
- Folded: 1991
- History: Maine Lumberjacks (1978–1983); Bay State Bombardiers (1983–1986); Toronto Tornados (1983–1985); Pensacola Tornados (1986–1991); Birmingham Bandits (1991–1992); Rochester Renegade (1992–1994); Harrisburg Hammerheads (1994–1995)
- Arena: Pensacola Civic Center
- Location: Pensacola, Florida
- Team colors: red, white, blue

The Pensacola Tornados was a basketball team that played in Pensacola, Florida in the Continental Basketball Association (CBA) from 1985–1991.

== 1985–1986 season ==
Ted Stepien bought a CBA franchise for Toronto in 1983 after threatening to move the Cleveland Cavaliers to that city. The Toronto Tornados played in the 1983–84 and 1984–85 seasons and started off the 1985–86 season in Toronto before declining attendance prompted Stepien to move the team to Pensacola mid-season. At the time, the CBA comprised fourteen teams. The newly relocated Tornados' first home game, on January 3, 1986, against the Florida Suncoast Stingers, drew 3,611 to the Pensacola Civic Center, and averaged 1,651 per game for the year. In fact, on January 25, 1986, the Tornados drew 8,417 in a win against the Detroit Spirits, at that time the second-largest crowd to ever attend a CBA contest. Guard Billy Goodwin was the only CBA player to finish in the Top-10 in both scoring and assists that season. Ronnie Williams, a power forward, averaged 23.3 points per game. Despite all this, the Tornados suffered through a 15–33 season. During the off-season, Stepien moved the team to Jacksonville, Florida and renamed them the Jets. It was a turbulent off-season in general in 1986, as the CBA shrunk to twelve teams. This franchise would move three more times before folding in 1996.

== 1986–1987 season ==
The Bay State Bombardiers moved to Pensacola to become the second version of the Tornados. This version began in 1978 as the Harrisburg Hammerheads, then the Maine Lumberjacks, on to Bay State before arriving in Pensacola. The team was purchased and moved to Pensacola by the major investors, Pensacola businessman Roger MacDonald and trial attorney Bob Crongeyer as well as Eli Jacobsen of Columbus, Ohio. Other investors included Pensacolians Joe Mooney, Frank Adams, Vince Whibbs and McGuire Martin. With new Director of Basketball Operations Tim Sise and new head coach Gary Youmans, the Tornados showed signs of life led by Tommy Davis and former New York Knicks 7'-1" veteran center Marvin Webster who led the team in rebounds. The team finished with a 20–28 record and made the playoffs for the first time. Webster was signed by the NBA Milwaukee Bucks before the season ended when he was replaced by Center Jerome Henderson who led the Tornados in rebounding for the rest of the season. Henderson would later receive a 10-day call-up to the Atlanta Hawks. In the playoffs the Tornados were eliminated four games to one by the Rapid City Thrillers.

== 1987–1988 season ==
Power forward Norris Coleman, 6'-8", 210 lbs., signed with the Tornados after playing one year with the NBA's Los Angeles Clippers. Coleman was selected in the second-round of the 1987 NBA draft (38th overall) by the Clippers after being named to the Big-8 All-Conference team while at Kansas State. Other key players were rookie guard Mark Wade, Tommy Davis, NBA veteran Freeman Williams, forward Bill Nelson and Jerome Henderson. By the end of the season, the Tornados were tearing up their opponents and would return the team to the playoffs with a 28–26 record. In the playoffs, Pensacola crushed the original Tornados franchise, the Mississippi Jets, now located in Biloxi, Mississippi, in a 4–1 run, but were swept by the Albany Patroons, coached by Phil Jackson, in four straight semifinal games. After the 1987–1988 season General Manager Tim Sise and head coach Gary Youmans left the Tornados to work with a new expansion team in Columbus, Ohio, that would become the Columbus Horizon.

== 1988–1989 season ==
A slow start hurt the Tornados, but by the end of January new head coach Joe Mullaney, formerly of Providence College, pulled his club up from the Eastern Division cellar into fourth place in the standings. Newly acquired 6'5", 190 lb. guard Brook Steppe averaged 25.7 points per game and earned a 10-day call-up to the Portland Trail Blazers. Point guard Mark Wade, who helped pace the Tornados in the 1987–88 season, broke the CBA record for most assists in a season (626). Even though the Tornados earned another playoff berth after finishing 30–24, they were knocked out of the playoffs by the Tulsa Fast Breakers – but not before giving Tulsa at least one loss in the Breakers' eventual playoff championship run. Pensacola trial lawyer Bob Crongeyer and Eli Jacobson remained as the Tornados sole owners and Crongeyer was President of the team.

== 1989–1990 season ==
In the 1989–1990 season, the Tornados enjoyed what was to become a team-record 32 games against 24 losses under head coach Joe Mullaney. Four players would receive NBA promotions: small forward Jim Farmer, guard and Pensacola native Clifford Lett, forward Bob McCann, and guard Mark Wade. Lett was named CBA Rookie of the Year after averaging 21 points a game. He was signed in March 1990 by the Chicago Bulls to a 10-day contract, and then to a second in April. Wade was a first-team CNA All-League selection. Tony Dawson, older brother of Dallas Mavericks forward Jerry Stackhouse, led the team with 25.9 points per game. After a strong first-round playoff series victory over the Grand Rapids Hoops two games to one, the Tornados lost another playoff run to the Albany Patroons three games to two in the best-of-five series. Tom and Jane McMillan of Brewton, Alabama, purchased the team from Bob Crongeyer and Eli Jacobsen midway during the 1989–90 season.

== 1990–1991 season ==
The franchise played one more year in Pensacola, garnered a 27–29 record and barely missed the playoffs on the final day of the regular season. Still, the Tornados led all CBA franchises in NBA call-ups that season, as Tony Dawson, Jim Farmer and Clifford Lett spent time in both the NBA and CBA. Missouri guard Adam Dawe joined team. Mark Wade led the CBA in assists (10.8 per game) once again. In March, 1991, team officials were looking at Knoxville, Tennessee, for possible relocation, but instead moved the team to Birmingham, Alabama, after the 1990–91 season, becoming the Birmingham Bandits. The franchise would later relocate to Rochester, Minnesota, where they became the Rochester Renegade, and one more time after that before folding in 1995.
