= Bob McNeill =

American basketball player

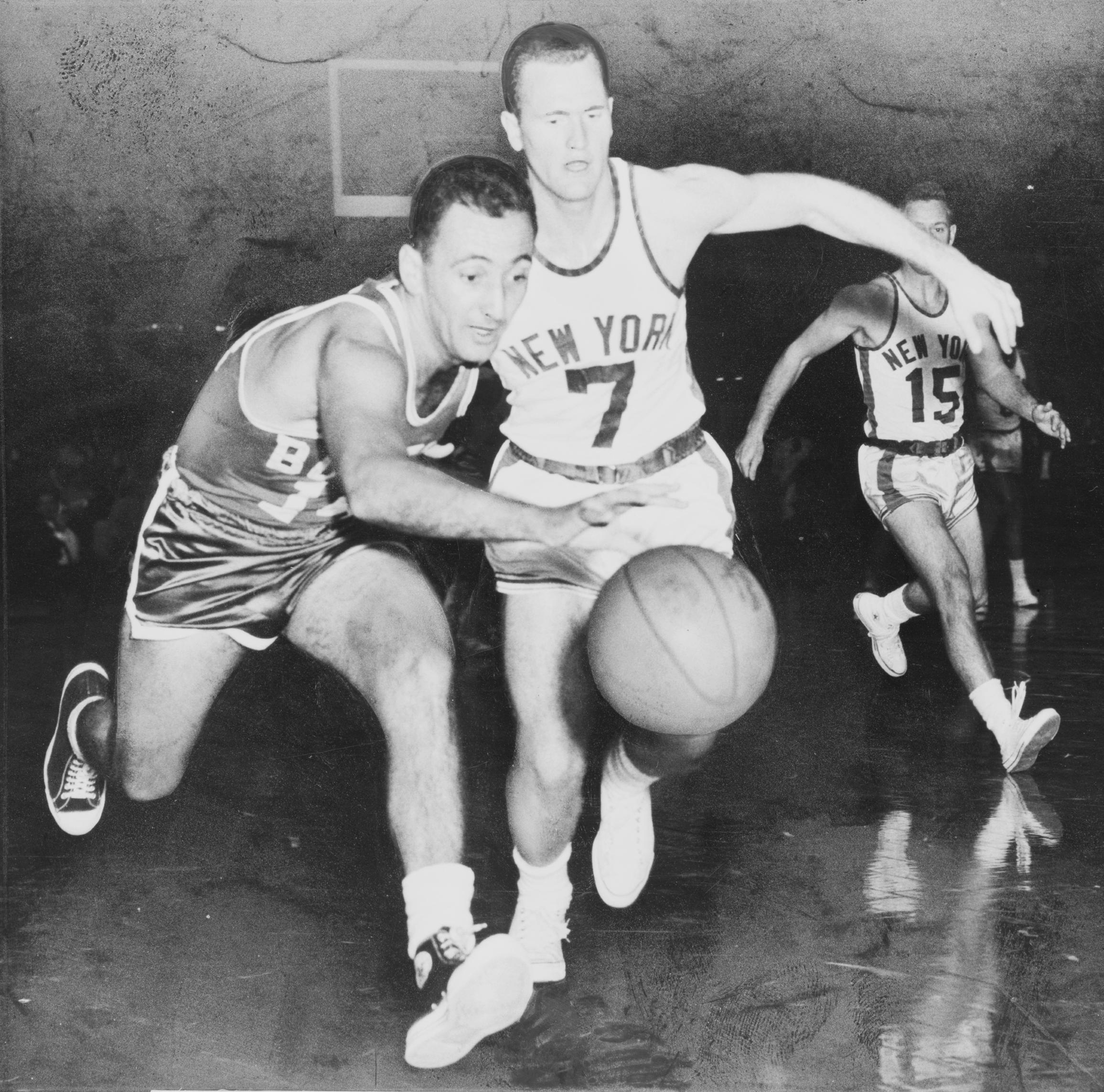
- Bob McNeill (#7) and Bob Cousy chase after the ball

Personal information
- Born: October 22, 1938 (age 88) Philadelphia, Pennsylvania, U.S.
- Listed height: 6 ft 1 in (1.85 m)
- Listed weight: 170 lb (77 kg)

Career information
- High school: North Catholic (Philadelphia, Pennsylvania)
- College: Saint Joseph's (1957–1960)
- NBA draft: 1960: 3rd round, 19th overall pick
- Drafted by: New York Knicks
- Playing career: 1960–1969
- Position: Point guard
- Number: 7, 34, 52

Career history
- 1960–1961: New York Knicks
- 1961: Philadelphia Warriors
- 1961–1962: Los Angeles Lakers
- 1962–1966: Camden Bullets
- 1966–1967: Trenton Colonials
- 1967–1969: Allentown Jets

Career highlights
- 2× EPBL champion (1964, 1968); 6× All-EPBL First Team (1963–1966, 1968, 1969)

Career NBA statistics
- Points: 575 (4.6 ppg)
- Rebounds: 179 (1.4 rpg)
- Assists: 327 (2.6 apg)
- Stats at NBA.com
- Stats at Basketball Reference

Robert J. McNeill (born October 22, 1938) is an American former professional basketball player. He played in the National Basketball Association (NBA) from 1960 to 1962.

== Biography ==
McNeill was born near 2nd and Allegheny in the Kensington section of Philadelphia, Pennsylvania. As a senior at North Catholic High School, McNeill once scored 46 points in a game, which is an all-time school record. He was selected as a 1st team All-Catholic player in 1956. As the team's point guard, McNeill led the 1956 Falcons basketball team to a Philadelphia Catholic League Championship, scoring 14 points in a one-point victory over La Salle. He then led the Falcons to their first ever City Basketball Championship Title by beating West Philadelphia. In the city title game, McNeill scored 29 points in a 68–67 victory at the Palestra.

McNeill then went on to play collegiately for the St. Joseph's Hawks. He led the team to the NCAA tournament in 1959 and 1960. He was named first-team All-Big 5 in 1958, 1959 and 1960 while he also earned All-American honors as a senior. Upon graduating, McNeill held the St. Joseph's record for assists in a game, a season, and a career. He still owns school record for free throws made and attempted in a game. He was inducted into the St Joseph's Athletic Hall of Fame in 2001.

McNeill was drafted in the third round by the New York Knicks in the 1960 NBA draft. He played guard during the course of his NBA career and played for the New York Knicks, Philadelphia Warriors and Los Angeles Lakers. McNeill averaged five points and three assists per game in his NBA career. He played in five games for the Lakers in the 1962 NBA Finals loss to the Boston Celtics.

In 1963, McNeill joined the Eastern Professional Basketball League (EPBL) and played alongside Paul Arizin for the Camden Bullets from 1962 until 1966. McNeill helped the Bullets win the 1964 EPBL Championship, where he averaged 20 points per game. He played for the Trenton Colonials during the 1966–67 season before finishing with the Allentown Jets from 1967 to 1969. He won another EPBL championship with the Jets in 1968. McNeill was a six-time All-EPBL First Team selection (1963–1966, 1968 and 1969).

== Career statistics ==
Legend
GP	Games played	GS	Games started	MPG	Minutes per game
FG%	Field goal percentage	3P%	3-point field goal percentage	FT%	Free throw percentage
RPG	Rebounds per game	APG	Assists per game	SPG	Steals per game
BPG	Blocks per game	PPG	Points per game	**Bold**	Career high

=== NBA ===
==== Regular season ====
Year	Team	GP	MPG	FG%	FT%	RPG	APG	PPG
1960–61	New York	**75**	**18.5**	.389	**.833**	**1.6**	**3.2**	**5.8**
1961–62	Philadelphia	21	10.1	**.447**	.818	1.6	2.3	4.1
1961–62	L.A. Lakers	29	7.9	.367	.667	.8	1.4	1.8
Career		125	14.6	.394	.819	1.4	2.6	4.6

==== Playoffs ====
Year	Team	GP	MPG	FG%	FT%	RPG	APG	PPG
1962	L.A. Lakers	5	6.0	.571	.500	1.2	1.0	1.8
