= Spider Bennett =

American basketball player

Personal information
- Born: August 4, 1943 (age 83) Lakewood Township, New Jersey, U.S.
- Listed height: 6 ft 3 in (1.91 m)
- Listed weight: 190 lb (86 kg)

Career information
- High school: Laurinburg Institute (Laurinburg, North Carolina)
- College: Winston-Salem State (1962–1966)
- NBA draft: 1966: undrafted
- Playing career: 1966–1972
- Position: Point guard
- Number: 6, 25

Career history
- 1966–1968: Hartford Capitols
- 1968–1969: Dallas Chaparrals
- 1969: Houston Mavericks
- 1969–1972: Hartford Capitols

Career highlights
- All-EPBL First Team (1968); All-EPBL Second Team (1970)
- Stats at Basketball Reference

Willis "Spider" Bennett (born August 4, 1943) is an American former basketball player.

Born in Lakewood Township, New Jersey, Bennett played collegiately for the Winston-Salem State University.

Bennett played for the Hartford Capitols of the Eastern Professional Basketball League (EPBL) / Eastern Basketball Association (EBA) from 1966 to 1968 and 1969 to 1972. He was selected to the All-EPBL First Team in 1968 and Second Team in 1970.

He played for the Dallas Chaparrals and Houston Mavericks (1968–69) in the ABA for 59 games.
