= Conner Henry =

American basketball player-coach

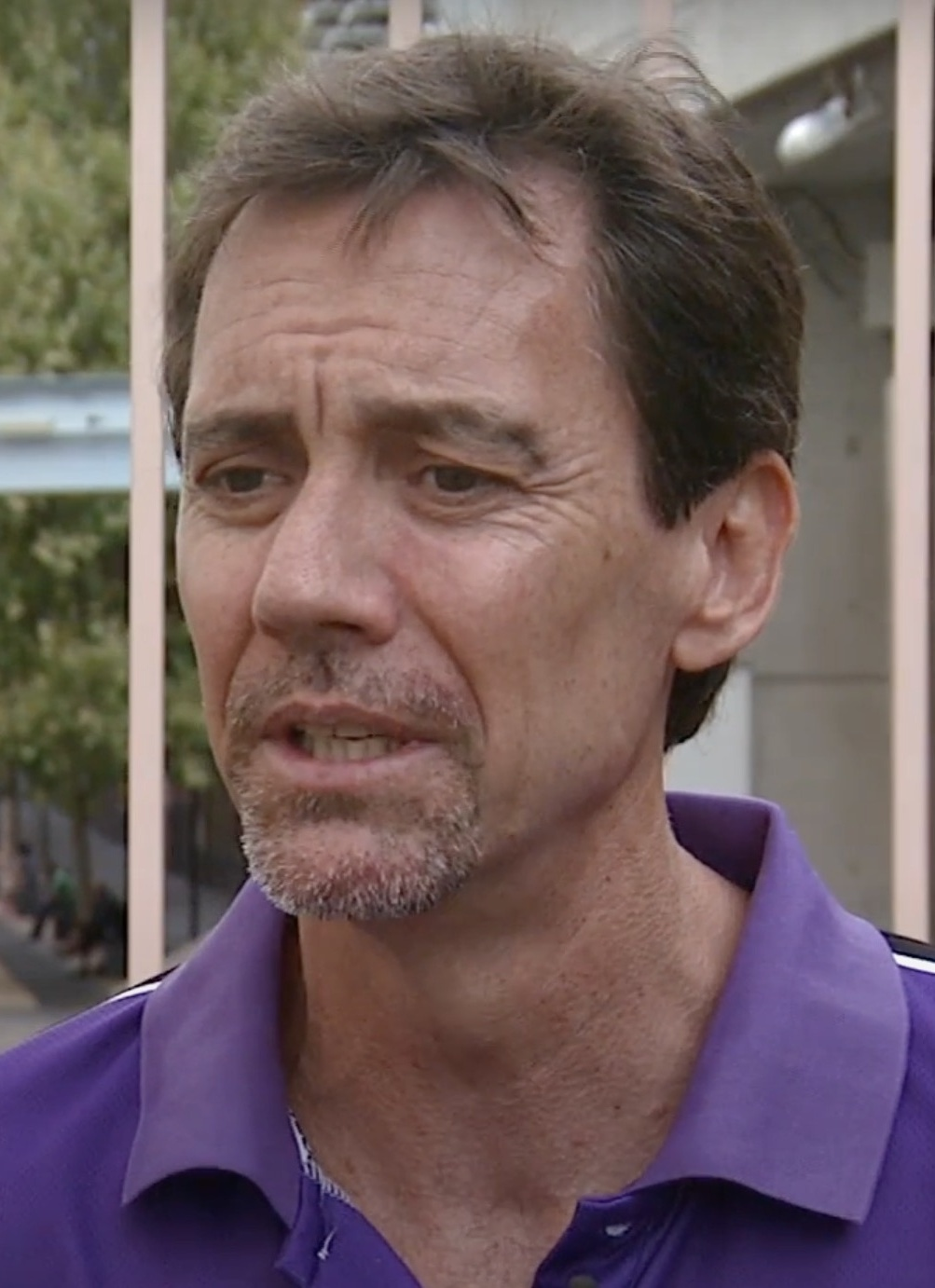
- Henry in 2011

South Adelaide Panthers
- Title: Head coach
- League: NBL1 Central

Personal information
- Born: July 21, 1963 (age 63) Claremont, California, U.S.
- Listed height: 6 ft 7 in (2.01 m)
- Listed weight: 195 lb (88 kg)

Career information
- High school: Claremont (Claremont, California)
- College: UC Santa Barbara (1982–1986)
- NBA draft: 1986: 4th round, 89th overall pick
- Drafted by: Houston Rockets
- Playing career: 1986–1998
- Position: Shooting guard / small forward
- Number: 4, 43, 21
- Coaching career: 2001–present

Career history

Playing
- 1986: Houston Rockets
- 1987: Boston Celtics
- 1987–1988: Milwaukee Bucks
- 1988: Sacramento Kings
- 1988–1989: Rapid City Thrillers
- 1989: Filodoro Brescia
- 1989–1990: Rapid City Thrillers
- 1990–1991: Telemarket Brescia
- 1991: Bakersfield Jammers
- 1991–1992: Yakima Sun Kings
- 1992: Mulhouse
- 1992–1993: Pamesa Valencia
- 1994–1996: Festina Andorra
- 1996–1997: Sporting Athens
- 1997–1998: Peristeri
- 1998: Müller Verona

Coaching
- 2001–2006: Claremont McKenna (assistant)
- 2006–2008: Perth Wildcats (assistant)
- 2008–2009: Perth Wildcats
- 2010–2011: Sydney Kings (assistant)
- 2011–2013: Los Angeles D-Fenders (assistant)
- 2013–2015: Fort Wayne Mad Ants
- 2015–2016: Orlando Magic (assistant)
- 2020–2021: Adelaide 36ers
- 2022–2023: Niigata Albirex
- 2023–2024: Charlotte 49ers (assistant)
- 2027–: South Adelaide Panthers

Career highlights
- As player: Greek League All-Star (1997); All-CBA First Team (1990); 2× CBA All-Star Game MVP (1990, 1992); 2× CBA All-Star (1990, 1992); Second-team All-PCAA (1986); As head coach: NBA D-League champion (2014); NBA D-League Coach of the Year (2014)
- Stats at NBA.com
- Stats at Basketball Reference

Conner David Henry (born July 21, 1963) is an American professional basketball coach and former player who is the head coach for the South Adelaide Panthers of the NBL1 Central. He played college basketball for the UC Santa Barbara Gauchos, and was selected by the Houston Rockets, with the 89th overall pick of the 1986 NBA draft. Henry had short stints with four National Basketball Association (NBA) teams, in two seasons, before he embarked on a career in the American minor leagues and overseas.

Henry began his coaching career as an assistant at Claremont McKenna College. He then moved to Australia, where he joined the coaching staff of the Perth Wildcats of the NBL, where he became the team's head coach, for one season in 2008–09. Henry then returned to the United States, to join the Los Angeles D-Fenders of the NBA D-League, as an assistant coach. Following two seasons with the D-Fenders, he was appointed as the head coach of the Fort Wayne Mad Ants, in 2013, and was he named the NBA D-League Coach of the Year, after his first season. Henry also served as an assistant coach for the Orlando Magic of the NBA, in the 2015–16 season. He returned to Australia in 2020, when he was appointed the head coach of the Adelaide 36ers.

== Playing career ==
=== College career ===
Henry attended Claremont High School, in Claremont, California, where he played competitive high school basketball. After high school, Henry played college basketball at UC Santa Barbara, where he played with the Gauchos. During his college career, which lasted from 1982 to 1986, he scored a total of 1,236 points.

=== Professional career ===
Henry, who was a 6-foot-7-inch (201 cm) tall, 195-pound (88 kg) shooting guard-small forward, was selected by the Houston Rockets, with the 19th pick of the fourth round, and 89th pick overall, of the 1986 NBA draft. Throughout his short NBA career, which lasted from 1986 to 1988, he played with the Rockets, Boston Celtics, Milwaukee Bucks and Sacramento Kings.

Henry also played for the Rapid City Thrillers and the Yakima Sun Kings of the CBA. In 1990, he was voted to the All-CBA First Team, as well as the CBA All-Star Game MVP. Then in 1992, he again played in the CBA All-Star Game, which was held in the Pacific Northwest, of which he was named the Most Valuable Player once again. During the 1992 CBA All-Star Game, he hit four-of-seven three-pointers, which was the most made in such an event since 1970. After his NBA career, Henry spent 10 years playing professionally in Italy, France, Spain and Greece, before returning to Montana.

== NBA career statistics ==
Legend
GP	Games played	GS	Games started	MPG	Minutes per game
FG%	Field goal percentage	3P%	3-point field goal percentage	FT%	Free throw percentage
RPG	Rebounds per game	APG	Assists per game	SPG	Steals per game
BPG	Blocks per game	PPG	Points per game	**Bold**	Career high

=== Regular season ===
Year	Team	GP	GS	MPG	FG%	3P%	FT%	RPG	APG	SPG	BPG	PPG
1986–87	Houston	18	0	5.1	.242	.091	.700	0.4	0.4	0.2	0.0	1.3
1986–87	Boston	**36**	0	6.4	.369	.387	.588	0.8	0.8	0.2	0.0	2.7
1987–88	Boston	10	0	8.1	.393	.375	**.900**	1.0	1.2	0.1	0.1	3.4
1987–88	Milwaukee	14	**2**	10.4	.317	.333	.571	**1.4**	**2.1**	0.3	0.1	2.3
1987–88	Sacramento	15	0	**13.8**	**.469**	**.484**	.867	1.3	1.7	**0.5**	**0.2**	**7.8**
Career		93	2	8.1	.378	.379	.757	0.9	1.1	0.2	0.1	3.3

=== Playoffs ===
Year	Team	GP	GS	MPG	FG%	3P%	FT%	RPG	APG	SPG	BPG	PPG
1986–87	Boston	11	0	3.2	.500	.200	.500	0.5	0.0	0.0	0.0	2.0

== Coaching career ==
After retiring from playing professional club basketball, Henry became an assistant basketball coach with the NCAA Division III's Claremont McKenna College (where his father also worked as a college professor) in his hometown of Claremont, California. He also served as associate director of the career services center, assisting students to gain employment. He remained there for five years, until 2006, when he was hired as an assistant coach for the Perth Wildcats of the Australian National Basketball League, where he worked under the team's head coach and his former college teammate Scott Fisher. After Fisher left the Wildcats, Henry became the team's head coach for the 2008–09 NBL season. In 2010, Conner joined the reformed Sydney Kings of the NBL, as an assistant coach with Ian Robilliard.

Henry later became an assistant coach for the Los Angeles D-Fenders of the NBA Development League. In October 2013, he was named the head coach of the NBA D-League's Fort Wayne Mad Ants, for the 2013–14 season. On April 17, 2014, he was named the winner of the 2014 Dennis Johnson Coach of the Year Award. On June 10, 2015, he stepped down as the Mad Ants' head coach, and he was then named the Los Angeles D-Fenders head coach. However, he gave up the position to become, on June 26, an assistant coach of the NBA's Orlando Magic. Henry also worked as a scout for the Minnesota Timberwolves, during games at the Staples Center, from 2017 to 2019.

On April 22, 2020, Henry signed a three-year deal to become the head coach of the Adelaide 36ers of the NBL. On August 26, 2021, the 36ers released Henry from his contract.

In July 2023, Henry joined the Charlotte 49ers men's basketball team as an assistant coach.

In January 2025, Henry was appointed Head of Basketball at St Peter's College in Adelaide.

In September 2026, Henry was appointed head coach of the South Adelaide Panthers men's team of the NBL1 Central for the 2027 and 2028 seasons.

== Head coaching record ==
=== NBA D-League ===
Legend
Regular season	G	Games coached	W	Games won	L	Games lost	W–L %	Win–loss %
Playoffs	PG	Playoff games	PW	Playoff wins	PL	Playoff losses	PW–L %	Playoff win–loss %

Team	Year	G	W	L	W–L%	Finish	PG	PW	PL	PW–L%	Result
Fort Wayne	2013–14	50	34	16	.680	1st in Eastern	6	6	0	1.000	Won NBA D-League Championship
Fort Wayne	2014–15	50	28	22	.560	2nd in Central	6	4	2	.667	Lost in NBA D-League Finals
Career		100	62	38	.620		12	10	2	.833	
