= Jeff Martin (basketball) =

American basketball player (born 1967)

Personal information
- Born: January 14, 1967 (age 59) Cherry Valley, Arkansas, U.S.
- Listed height: 6 ft 5 in (1.96 m)
- Listed weight: 195 lb (88 kg)

Career information
- High school: Cross County (Cherry Valley, Arkansas)
- College: Murray State (1985–1989)
- NBA draft: 1989: 2nd round, 31st overall pick
- Drafted by: Los Angeles Clippers
- Playing career: 1989–2001
- Position: Shooting guard
- Number: 15

Career history
- 1989–1991: Los Angeles Clippers
- 1991–1992: Grand Rapids Hoops
- 1992: Scani Venezia
- 1992–1993: Banco Natwest Zaragoza
- 1993–1994: Grand Rapids Hoops
- 1994: CRO Lyon Basket
- 1994–1995: Strasbourg IG
- 1995–1996: Baloncesto Salamanca
- 1996: Baloncesto Fuenlabrada
- 1997: Besançon BCD
- 1997–1998: Ciudad de Huelva
- 1998–1999: Grand Rapids Hoops
- 1999–2000: Las Vegas Silver Bandits
- 2000–2001: Montpellier

Career highlights
- CBA All-Star Game MVP (1994); 3× All-CBA Second Team (1992, 1994, 1999); 2× OVC Player of the Year (1988, 1989); No. 15 retired by Murray State Racers
- Stats at NBA.com
- Stats at Basketball Reference

Jeffery Allen Martin (born January 14, 1967) is an American former professional basketball player.

Martin, a 6'5" shooting guard from Murray State University, was selected in the second round, 31st pick overall in the 1989 NBA draft, by the Los Angeles Clippers. He played two seasons in the NBA.

== College career ==
In 1988, Martin became the first basketball player in Murray State, and Ohio Valley Conference, history to be invited to the Olympic trials for the US Basketball Team. This was the last year that professionals were not allowed on the team. Martin did not make the team but impressed many with his performance. In 1989, he was named an All-American and had his number (15) retired. He is still the all-time scoring leader in the Murray State men's basketball program history with 2,484 points

== Professional career ==
Martin played in the NBA from 1989 to 1991, with career averages of 7 points and 2 rebounds in 143 regular season contests. Having played during preseason with the Detroit Pistons, Martin was waived before 1991-92 began, subsequently moving to Europe, where he appeared for Scaini Venezia (1991–92), Natwest Zaragoza (1992–93), Baloncesto Salamanca (1995–96), Baloncesto Fuenlabrada and Besançon Basket (1996–97), CB Ciudad de Huelva (1997–98) and Montpellier Basket (2000–01). These were punctuated by brief returns to the U.S., in both the Continental Basketball Association (CBA), always with the Grand Rapids Hoops, and the International Basketball League (IBL). Martin was a three-time selection to the All-CBA Second Team in 1992, 1994 and 1999, and named as the CBA All-Star Game Most Valuable Player in 1994.
