= Ron Rowan =

American-Irish basketball player

Personal information
- Born: April 23, 1962 (age 64) New Brighton, Pennsylvania, U.S.
- Listed height: 6 ft 4 in (1.93 m)
- Listed weight: 200 lb (91 kg)

Career information
- High school: Beaver Falls (Beaver Falls, Pennsylvania)
- College: Notre Dame (1981–1983); St. John's (1984–1986)
- NBA draft: 1986: 3rd round, 67th overall pick
- Drafted by: Philadelphia 76ers
- Playing career: 1986–2001
- Position: Small forward
- Number: 11

Career history
- 1986: Springfield Fame
- 1986–1987: Topeka Sizzlers
- 1987: Portland Trail Blazers
- 1987–1988: Topeka Sizzlers
- 1988: Miami Tropics
- 1988–1989: Cedar Rapids Silver Bullets
- 1989: Hitachi Venezia
- 1989–1992: Kleenex Pistoia
- 1992–1993: Yoga Napoli
- 1993–1994: Tonno Auriga Trapani
- 1994: Meta System Reggio Emilia
- 1995: Baloncesto León
- 1995: Il Menestrello Modena
- 1995–1996: Chicago Rockers
- 1997: Fuenlabrada
- 1997–1998: PAOK
- 1998–1999: Polti Cantù
- 1999–2000: Telit Trieste
- 2000–2001: Montepaschi Siena

Career highlights
- CBA Rookie of the Year (1987)
- Stats at NBA.com
- Stats at Basketball Reference

Ronald Lewis Rowan (born April 23, 1962) is a retired American-Irish basketball player. Rowan, a 6'5" 200 lb small forward, played collegiately at the University of Notre Dame and St. John's University.

== High school and college career ==
Born in New Brighton, Pennsylvania, Rowan starred at Beaver Falls (Pennsylvania) High School, averaging nearly 26 points per game as a senior. In February 1981, he committed to play for the University of Notre Dame, then coached by Digger Phelps. In January 1983, Phelps suspended Rowan after learning that Rowan was planning to transfer to Penn State. When Penn State coach Dick Harter left Penn State, Rowan was released from his commitment and later transferred to St. John's University.

In his first season at St. John's, Rowan played in 28 games alongside Chris Mullin, Mark Jackson, Willie Glass, and Bill Wennington, as the team went 31–4.

As a senior during the 1985–86 season at St. John's, Rowan averaged 14 points per game. Along with Jackson, Walter Berry, and Shelton Jones, Rowan helped St. John's to a 31–5 record. Rowan currently ranks among St. John's all-time top 10 free-throw percentage leaders (.871).

== Professional career ==
He was selected in the third round of the 1986 NBA draft by the Philadelphia 76ers but was cut from the team during training camp. He then played in the Continental Basketball Association, earning Rookie of the Year honors in 1987 while a member of the Topeka (Kansas) Sizzlers, where he averaged 18.8 points in 44 games.

In March 1987, he signed a 10-day contract with the Portland Trail Blazers, averaging 1.7 points in seven games.

In 1989, Rowan moved to Italy where he played 11 seasons (5 in A1 division). He changed teams almost every year except when he played three seasons in Kleenex Pistoia (1989–1992), where he scored 3,767 points in 117 matches.

== Personal life ==
Rowan's son Maverick Rowan played college basketball for NC State.

== Career statistics ==
Legend
GP	Games played	GS	Games started	MPG	Minutes per game
FG%	Field goal percentage	3P%	3-point field goal percentage	FT%	Free throw percentage
RPG	Rebounds per game	APG	Assists per game	SPG	Steals per game
BPG	Blocks per game	PPG	Points per game	**Bold**	Career high

=== NBA ===
==== Regular season ====
Year	Team	GP	GS	MPG	FG%	3P%	FT%	RPG	APG	SPG	BPG	PPG
1986–87	Portland	7	0	2.3	.444	1.000	.750	.1	.1	.6	.0	1.7
