= Tim Legler =

American basketball player (born 1966)

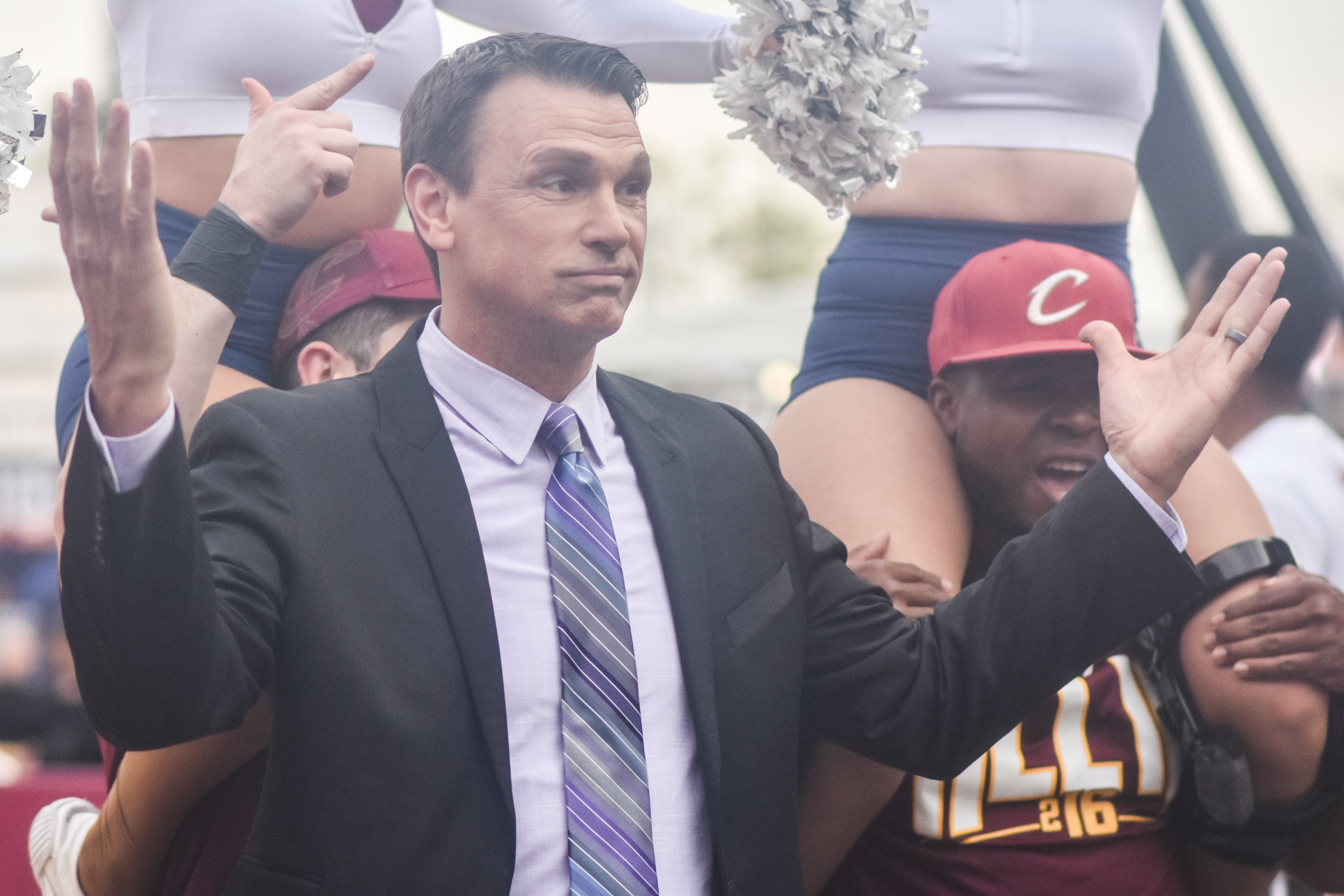
- Legler at Cleveland Cavaliers Fan Fest in 2016

Personal information
- Born: December 26, 1966 (age 59) Washington, D.C., U.S.
- Listed height: 6 ft 4 in (1.93 m)
- Listed weight: 200 lb (91 kg)

Career information
- High school: John Randolph Tucker (Richmond, Virginia)
- College: La Salle (1984–1988)
- NBA draft: 1988: undrafted
- Playing career: 1988–1999
- Position: Shooting guard
- Number: 23, 22, 18, 20

Career history
- 1988: Philadelphia Aces
- 1988–1989: Rochester Flyers
- 1989: Youngstown Pride
- 1989–1990: Omaha Racers
- 1990: Phoenix Suns
- 1990: Philadelphia Aces
- 1990: Omaha Racers
- 1990–1991: Denver Nuggets
- 1991: Philadelphia Spirit
- 1991–1992: Omaha Racers
- 1992: Limoges CSP
- 1992: Philadelphia Spirit
- 1992: Utah Jazz
- 1992–1993: Omaha Racers
- 1993–1994: Dallas Mavericks
- 1994–1995: Omaha Racers
- 1995: Golden State Warriors
- 1995–1999: Washington Bullets / Wizards
- 1999: Golden State Warriors

Career highlights
- NBA Three-Point Contest champion (1996); 4x CBA All-Star (1990, 1992, 1993, 1995); 2× All-CBA First Team (1991, 1993); All-CBA Second Team (1995); CBA scoring champion (1993)

Career statistics
- Points: 1,967 (6.9 ppg)
- Rebounds: 481 (1.6 rpg)
- Assists: 402 (1.3 apg)
- Stats at NBA.com
- Stats at Basketball Reference

Timothy Eugene Legler (born December 26, 1966), nicknamed "Legs", is an American former professional basketball player who played in the National Basketball Association (NBA). He is currently an ESPN basketball analyst and co-host/analyst on SiriusXM NBA Radio.

== College career ==
Legler attended La Salle University, where he became an Academic All-American and scored 1,699 career points in four seasons for the men's basketball team. He was named to the First Team All-Big 5 (1987) and All-MAAC teams (1987 and 1988). Legler's 3.40 GPA earned him a place on the 1988 GTE Academic All-American Team. He was a career 43 percent three-point shooter. Legler led La Salle to the 1987 National Invitation Tournament championship game at Madison Square Garden as well as the 1988 NCAA tournament. He was inducted into the Philadelphia Big 5 Hall of Fame in 1995 and the La Salle Hall of Athletes in 1997.

== NBA career ==
Legler went undrafted in the 1988 NBA draft and played in minor leagues such as the Continental Basketball Association (CBA) & USBL from 1988–1995 around stints in the NBA with the Suns, Nuggets, Jazz & Mavericks. He led the Omaha Racers to a CBA championship while leading the league in scoring & was a 4-time CBA All-Star. Legler was selected to the All-CBA First Team in 1991 and 1993, and Second Team in 1995. He also played in France in 1992 for Limoges.

Legler played in the NBA at the shooting guard position from 1990 to 1999. He is primarily known for his time in Washington, where he played four seasons (two with the Washington Bullets and two with the renamed Washington Wizards) from 1995 to 1999. Legler also played for the Phoenix Suns, Denver Nuggets, Utah Jazz, Dallas Mavericks, and Golden State Warriors.

During the 1995–96 season, he won the 1996 Three-Point Shootout during All-Star Weekend and holds the record for a 3-round aggregate of 65 points, having tallied 23, 22, and 20 in each round, out of a maximum possible of 30 points per round, and 90 overall. He continued on to have his most productive season statistically, leading the league in both three-point field goal percentage and true shooting percentage, and ranked third in turnover ratio. Legler made 128 three-pointers, which was over 49% of all career threes he made. Legler was one of three NBA players to finish a season shooting better than 50 percent from the field, better than 50 percent from the three-point line, and better than 80 percent from the free-throw line, the others being Steve Kerr and Detlef Schrempf.

Legler was well known as an accurate three-point shooter, making 260 of his 604 three-pointer attempts in his career. His 43.1% accuracy from three-point range registers as eighth on the NBA's all-time list.

His career ended due to a recurring knee problem. During his 10 seasons in the league, Legler made approximately $5,144,000 in salary.

== Post-NBA career ==
Legler began working on ESPN in 2000, where he has worked as a basketball analyst on the programs NBA Shootaround, NBA Fastbreak, First Take, NBA Coast to Coast, SportsCenter and various shows on ESPN Radio. He currently also is a co-host with Adam Mares on the All-NBA podcast.

Legler was considered a front-runner for the vacant La Salle head coaching job in 2018, but the position was ultimately given to Ashley Howard.

== Personal life ==
Legler attended John Randolph Tucker High School in Henrico County, Virginia and St. Mary's Catholic School in Richmond, Virginia. In 2002, he earned an MBA from the Wharton School at the University of Pennsylvania. He is married to Christina (née Fuller) who is a former Philadelphia Eagles Cheerleader. They welcomed their son in November 2021. Legler has two children with his ex-wife Jennifer and resides in the Tampa Bay, Florida area.

== Career statistics ==
Legend
GP	Games played	GS	Games started	MPG	Minutes per game
FG%	Field goal percentage	3P%	3-point field goal percentage	FT%	Free throw percentage
RPG	Rebounds per game	APG	Assists per game	SPG	Steals per game
BPG	Blocks per game	PPG	Points per game	**Bold**	Career high

*	Led the league

=== NBA ===
==== Regular season ====
Year	Team	GP	GS	MPG	FG%	3P%	FT%	RPG	APG	SPG	BPG	PPG
1989–90	Phoenix	11	0	7.5	.379	.000	**1.000**	.7	.5	.2	.0	2.5
1990–91	Denver	10	0	14.8	.347	.250	.833	1.8	1.2	.2	.0	5.8
1992–93	Utah	3	0	1.7	.333	–	–	.3	.0	.0	.0	.7
1992–93	Dallas	30	0	21.0	.437	.338	.803	**1.9**	1.5	**.8**	.2	**9.6**
1993–94	Dallas	**79**	0	16.7	.438	.374	.840	1.6	1.5	.7	.2	8.3
1994–95	Golden State	24	0	15.5	**.522**	.520	.882	1.7	1.1	.5	.0	7.3
1995–96	Washington	77	0	**23.1**	.507	**.522***	.863	1.8	**1.8**	.6	.2	9.4
1996–97	Washington	15	0	12.1	.313	.276	.857	1.4	.5	.2	**.3**	2.9
1997–98	Washington	8	0	9.5	.158	.000	.750	.5	.4	.1	.0	1.1
1998–99	Washington	30	0	12.6	.443	.400	.500	1.3	.7	.1	.1	4.0
1999–00	Golden State	23	**4**	12.3	.359	.333	.778	1.0	1.0	.2	.0	3.3
Career		310	4	16.9	.447	.431	.840	1.6	1.3	.5	.1	7.0

==== Playoffs ====
Year	Team	GP	GS	MPG	FG%	3P%	FT%	RPG	APG	SPG	BPG	PPG
1997	Washington	3	0	6.3	.000	.000	.500	.3	.7	.0	.0	.3

== See also ==
- List of National Basketball Association career 3-point field goal percentage leaders
