= Fargo–Moorhead Fever =

- League: CBA
- Founded: 1992
- Folded: 1994
- Arena: Fargodome
- Location: Fargo–Moorhead
- Team colors: teal, white, black
- Head coach: Steve Bontrager

The Fargo–Moorhead Fever were a professional basketball team based in the Fargo–Moorhead metropolitan area on the North Dakota–Minnesota border. The Fever were members of the Continental Basketball Association (CBA) for two seasons, from 1992 to 1994. Steve Bontrager served as the team's head coach during their two seasons. The team played their home games at the Fargodome in Fargo, North Dakota during the 1993–94 season. The franchise was put up for sale after the 1993–94 season and an ownership group from Mexico City purchased the franchise over two other bids. The team was known as the Mexico City Aztecas during the 1994–95 season.

Jon Absey, who portrayed the Utah Jazz mascot Jazz Bear, got his start in basketball promotions as Fargo-Moorhead's mascot. His employment was terminated after management determined a stunt in which Absey rode a toboggan down the stadium's steps was too dangerous, however that stunt is now a staple of Jazz Bear's performance.

== Season-by-season records ==
Years	Games	Wins	Losses	Winning percentage	Ref
1992–93	46	18	28	.391	
1993–94	56	25	31	.446	
Totals	102	43	59	.422	

== See also ==
- Fargo–Moorhead Beez
