= Michigan Mayhem =

Professional minor-league basketball team in Muskegon, Michigan

- League: Continental Basketball Association
- Established: 2004
- Folded: 2006
- History: Grand Rapids Hoops (1989–1995, 1996–2003); Grand Rapids Mackers (1995–1996); Michigan Mayhem (2004–2006)
- Arena: L.C. Walker Arena
- Capacity: 4,900
- Location: Muskegon, Michigan
- Ownership: Jannie Scott

The Michigan Mayhem were a minor league professional basketball team based in Muskegon, Michigan, that competed in the Continental Basketball Association (CBA). In the CBA's 2004–2005 season, the Mayhem finished third in the league's Eastern Conference. The team played its home games at the L.C. Walker Arena.

The team had previously played in nearby Grand Rapids, Michigan, where they were known as the Grand Rapids Hoops and Grand Rapids Mackers. The Mayhem roster included two ex-NBA players, Sam Mack, Roy Tarpley, and Joe Hernandez.

Citing a lack of community support, the team announced on June 22, 2006, that it would not return for a third season.
