= Grand Rapids Hoops =

- Leagues: CBA (1989–2001, 2002–2003); IBL (2001)
- Founded: 1989
- Folded: 2003
- History: Grand Rapids Hoops (1989–1995, 1996–2003); Grand Rapids Mackers (1995–96); Michigan Mayhem (2004–2006)
- Arena: DeltaPlex Arena
- Capacity: 5,000
- Location: Grand Rapids, Michigan
- Team colors: purple, white, black

The Grand Rapids Hoops were an American basketball team that played in the Continental Basketball Association (CBA) based in Grand Rapids, Michigan. Their first season was in 1989 and their final season was in 2003. Professional basketball later returned to Grand Rapids with the Grand Rapids Flight in 2004.

== League history ==
The team started and played in the Continental Basketball Association until the league folded in 2001. They joined the International Basketball League for one season before returning to a resurrected CBA the following year where they stayed until their demise.

== Name history ==
The team first played in 1989 as the Grand Rapids Hoops. When the team was sold in 1995 to the people who ran the Gus Macker 3-on-3 Scott McNeal, the nickname changed to the Grand Rapids Mackers. The team was sold again a year later to an investment group with Bob Przybysz as the managing partner and the name reverted to the Grand Rapids Hoops.

== Home court history ==
The Grand Rapids Hoops began their play in Welsh Auditorium in 1989. When the Van Andel Arena opened in the mid 1996, the Hoops moved there joining the Grand Rapids Griffins as tenants. As attendance fell, the team moved to the DeltaPlex, a smaller arena located out of the downtown area. The team disbanded in 2003. The franchise was purchased and moved to nearby Muskegon's LC Walker Arena and renamed the Michigan Mayhem in 2004, which has now been disbanded as well.
