= 1991 CBA All-Star Game =

1991 CBA organised All-Star Game

American Conference	National Conference
116	120
- Date: January 19, 1991
- Venue: Five Seasons Center, Cedar Rapids
- MVP: Vincent Askew
- Attendance: 4,637

The 1991 Continental Basketball Association All-Star Game was the 29th All-Star Game organised by CBA since its inception in 1949. It was held at the Five Seasons Center in Cedar Rapids, Iowa on January 19, 1991, in front of 4,637 spectators. The National Conference defeated the American Conference 120–116.

Vincent Askew was named the MVP. The game was televised by ESPN.

It was the first appearance of coach George Karl of Albany Patroons (and former of Real Madrid).

== The 1991 CBA All-Star Game events ==
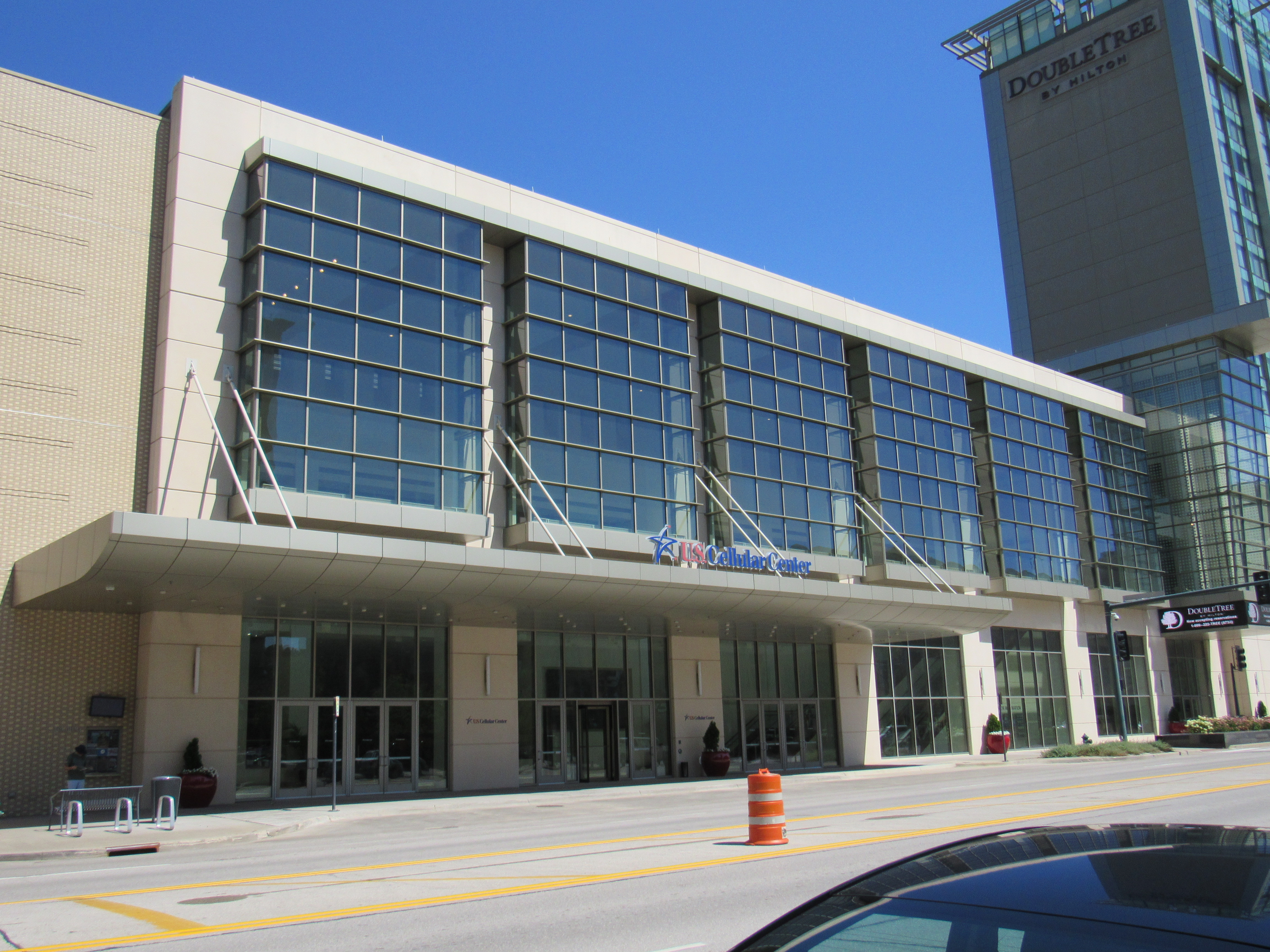
The Five Seasons Center

=== CBA Long Distance Shootout ===
Everette Stephens of Rockford Lightning was the winner. He defeated Leon Wood in the final by 36–21.

=== Slum-dunk ===
This year the contest was not held.

=== One-on-One challenge ===
The contestants played in a knock-out format aiming to reach first 21 pts in 7-minute matches (it would end automatically if a player hit 21). The shot-clock was set 10 at seconds.

The players participated were: Anthony Frederick (played in the 1987 CBA All-Star Game), Todd Mitchell, Derrick Taylor, Peter Thibeaux, Richard Morton, Mario Elie, Vincent Askew and Stephen Thompson.

Mario Elie was the winner. He defeated Stephen Thompson and won the One on one title.

=== The Game ===
The match was decided at the very end. The American Conference, wasted an opportunity to equalize at four seconds before the end, when Everette Stephens won a foul, but he missed 2 of 3 free throws. Then, Albany Patroons player Mario Elie, who overall scored 22 pts, added two free throws and he finally gave the National Conference the victory.

Tharon Mayes had 13 points for the National Conference.

== All-Star teams ==
=== Rosters ===
National Conference
Pos.	Player	Team	Previous appearances
Team
F	(United States) Mario Elie	Albany Patroons	
G	(United States) Vincent Askew	Albany Patroons	1988-89, 1990
C	(United States) Willie Simmons	Omaha Racers	
C	(United States) Anthony Frederick	Oklahoma City Cavalry	1987 (LaCrosse Catbirds)
F	(United States) Barry Stevens	Wichita Falls Texans	
F	(United States) Derrick Taylor	Wichita Falls Texans	
G	(United States) Tharon Mayes	Sioux Falls Skyforce	
F	(United States) Brian Howard	Omaha Racers	
F	(United States) Pat Durham	Cedar Rapids Silver Bullets	
F	(United States) Peter Thibeaux	Cedar Rapids Silver Bullets	
Head coach: (United States) George Karl (Albany Patroons)

American Conference
Pos.	Player	Team	Previous appearances
Team
G	(United States) Stephen Thompson	Rapid City Thrillers	
G	(United States) Everette Stephens	Rockford Lightning	
F	(United States) Leon Wood	Rapid City Thrillers	1990
C	(United States) Thomas Brown		
C	(United States) Ronald Draper	Quad City Thunder	1990
G	(United States) Richard Morton	San Jose Jammers	1990
G	(United States) Todd Mitchell	La Crosse Catbirds	1988-89
C	(United States) Jim Rowinski	Yakima Sun Kings	1990
G	(United States) Luther Burks	Yakima Sun Kings	
Head coach:

== Awards ==
MVP	Topscorer	Slam-dunk champion	Long Distance Shootout Winner	One-on-One champion
(United States) Vincent Askew	(United States) Mario Elie	-	(United States) Everette Stephens	(United States) Mario Elie

=== Result ===
Team 1	Score	Team 2
National Conference	120 - 116	American Conference

== Former NBA players ==
- (United States) Anthony Frederick
- (United States) Vincent Askew
- (United States) Peter Thibeaux
- (United States) Everette Stephens
- (United States) Leon Wood
- (United States) Richard Morton
- (United States) Todd Mitchell
- (United States) Jim Rowinski

== See also ==
- 1990 CBA All-Star Game
- Continental Basketball Association

== Sources ==
- HISTORY OF THE CBA ALL STAR GAME
