= 1990 CBA All-Star Game =

1990 CBA organised All-Star Game

| American Conference | National Conference |
|---|---|
| 105 | 107 |
- Date: January 21, 1990
- Venue: Wharton Field House, Moline
- MVP: Conner Henry
- Attendance: 4,327

The 1990 Continental Basketball Association All-Star Game was the 28th All-Star Game organised by CBA since its inception in 1949. It was held at the Wharton Field House in Moline, Illinois (Quad Cities) on January 21, 1990, in front of 4,327 spectators. The National Conference defeated the American Conference 107–105.

Conner Henry was named the MVP.

It was Tim Legler's first of four career appearances. Each of the 16 СВA franchises were represented by at least one player. The game featured thirteen of the 1989–90 league's top scorers.

Prior to the event, Mauro Panaggio, coach of Quad City Thunder, had the record of most CBA wins as during his ninth season, his record was 261-140 (65%) (including only regular season matches). On the other side, Eric Musselman was only 24 at the time and the youngest coach in the CBA history. It was his first All-Sta Game.

Twenty-seven NBA scouts attended the game.

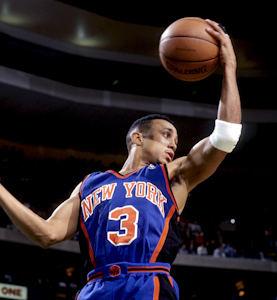
John Starks was selected for the All-Star Game (here in 1996 with the New York Knicks)

== The 1990 CBA All-Star Game events ==
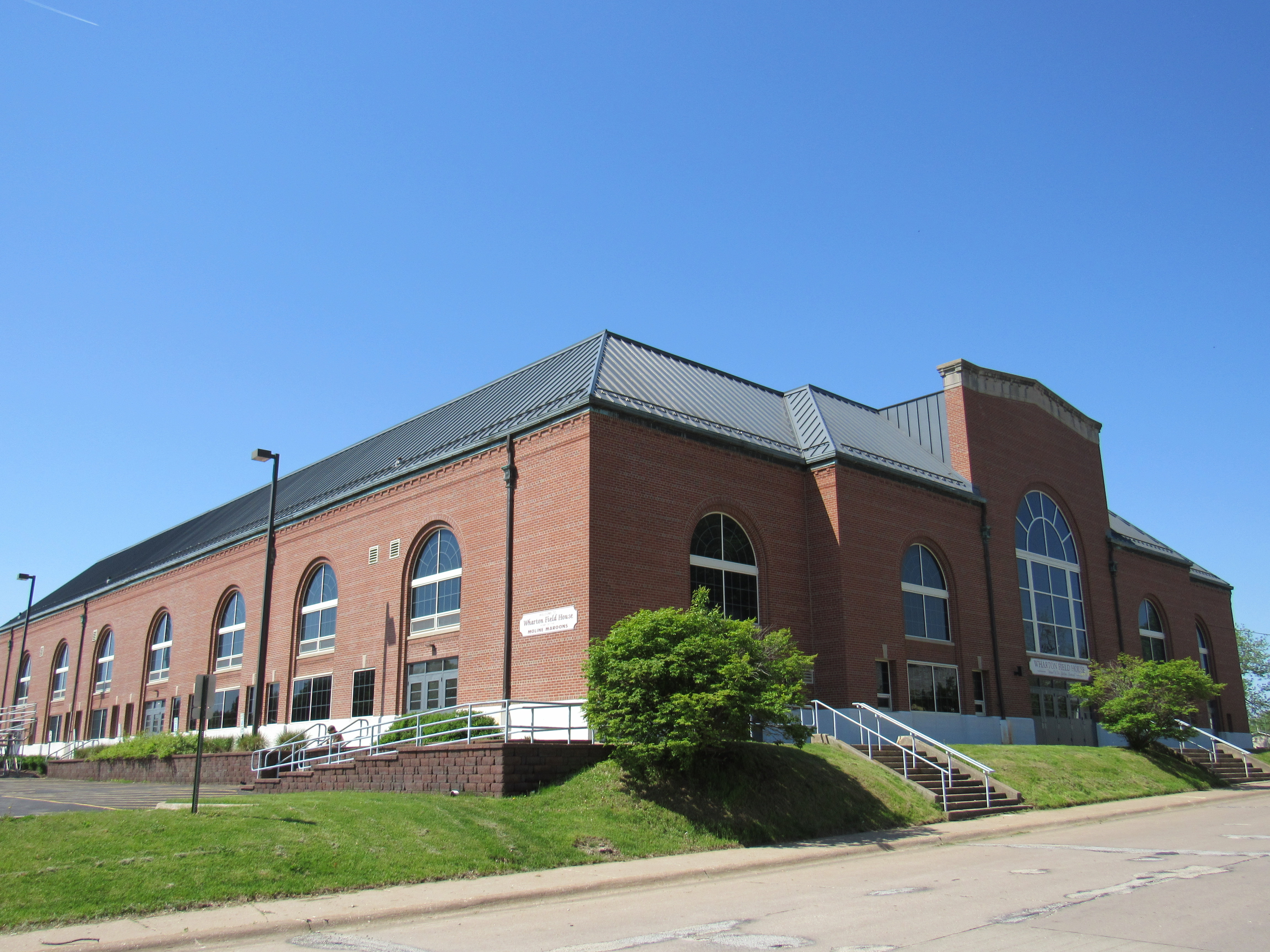
The Wharton Field House

=== CBA Long Distance Shootout ===
Jose Slaughter of Quad City Thunder was the winner beating Leon Wood 15–9 in the final.

=== Slum-dunk ===
Gerry Wright of Pensacola Tornados was the winner. He beat Don Jacobs of Tulsa Fast Breakers in the final, by 141–124.

=== The Game ===
Tim Legler was the top scorer of the match with 17 pts for the National Conference (teammate Ralph Lewis had 5 pts).

== All-Star teams ==
=== Rosters ===
National Conference
| Pos. | Number | Player | Team | Previous appearances |
Starters
| G | #30 | (United States) Tim Legler | Omaha Racers | |
| G | #32 | (United States) Ralph Lewis | Sioux Falls Skyforce | |
| F | #34 | (United States) Derrick Gervin | Santa Barbara Islanders | |
| F | #22 | (United States) Conner Henry | Rapid City Thrillers | |
| C | #44 | (United States) Jim Rowinski | Topeka Sizzlers | |
Reserves
| F | #42 | (United States) (Australia) Scott Fisher | San Jose Jammers | |
| G | #45 | (United States) Leon Wood | Santa Barbara Islanders | |
| G | #24 | (United States) Richard Morton | San Jose Jammers | |
| G | #10 | (United States) Michael Tait | Wichita Falls Texans | |
| C | #50 | (United States) Ozell Jones | Tulsa Fast Breakers | |
| C | | (United States) Ronald Draper | Quad City Thunder | |
| F | | (United States) Gerry Wright | Pensacola Tornados | |
Head coach: (United States) Eric Musselman (Rapid City Thrillers)

American Conference
| Pos. | Number | Player | Team | Previous appearances |
Starters
| G | #24 | (United States) Fred Cofield | Rockford Lightning | 1988-89 |
| G | #20 | (United States) Jose Slaughter | Quad City Thunder | |
| F | #12 | (United States) Bill Jones | Quad City Thunder | 1988-89 |
| F | #40 | (United States) Vincent Askew | Albany Patroons | 1988-89 |
| C | #44 | (United States) Bob McCann | Pensacola Tornados | |
Reserves
| F | #34 | (United States) Winston Crite | Grand Rapids Hoops | |
| G | #32 | (United States) John Starks | Cedar Rapids Silver Bullets | |
| G | #22 | (United States) Steve Harris | Columbus Horizon | |
| F | #50 | (United States) Orlando Graham | Cedar Rapids Silver Bullets | |
| G | #10 | (United States) Tony White | La Crosse Catbirds | |
| F | | (United States) Dwayne McClain | La Crosse Catbirds | 1988-89 |
Head coach: (United States) Mauro Panaggio (Quad City Thunder)

=== Result ===
| Team 1 | Score | Team 2 |
|---|---|---|
| National Conference | 107 - 105 | American Conference |

== Awards ==
| MVP | Topscorer | Slam-dunk champion | Long Distance Shootout Winner |
|---|---|---|---|
| (United States) Conner Henry | (United States) Tim Legler | (United States) Gerry Wright | (United States) Jose Slaughter |

== See also ==
- 1988-89 CBA All-Star Game
- Continental Basketball Association

== Sources ==
- the 1990 cba all-star classic
- HISTORY OF THE CBA ALL STAR GAME
