= Bill Ficke =

American basketball coach and scout

- Coaching career: 1982–1986

Career history

Coaching
- 1982–1984: Denver Nuggets (assistant)
- 1985–1986: Kansas City Sizzlers

Bill Ficke is an American basketball coach and scout.

Before the 1982–83 season, Ficke hired by the Denver Nuggets of the National Basketball Association (NBA) to be an assistant coach. He returned to the team for the 1983–84 NBA season. Denver Post sports writer Terry Frei recalled that Ficke would bring his Golden Retriever to practice with him.

Ficke served as head coach of the Nuggets during a game against the Phoenix Suns on March 22, 1983, because Denver head coach Doug Moe was out with influenza. Denver won the game 131–117 with Nuggets forward Kiki Vandeweghe, who led all scorers with 29. Moe was suspended for ordering the Nuggets to not play defense during a game against the Portland Trail Blazers on November 22, 1983. As a result, Ficke was forced to serve as head coach of the team during their next two games on November 30 and December 3. Denver lost the first game against the Milwaukee Bucks, 156–115.

Ficke was dismissed from his position of assistant coach of the Denver Nuggets by general manager Vince Boryla in July 1984. Allan Bristow succeeded Ficke as Denver's assistant coach.

During the 1984–85 NBA season Ficke served as a scout for the Los Angeles Clippers, Indiana Pacers and Utah Jazz.

On July 20, 1985, Ficke was hired by the fledgling Kansas City Sizzlers Continental Basketball Association (CBA) franchise as head coach and director of basketball operations. His contract was not renewed following the Sizzlers 25–23 season. John Killilea succeeded Ficke as the Sizzlers head coach.

In 1975 Ficke opened an independent footwear retail store at the Aurora Mall (now known as Town Center at Aurora) in Aurora, Colorado. Initially Ficke was looking for a short-term lease in case the business floundered, however, he ended up taking a 15-year lease. This worked in his favor as his competitor's rent costs increased over the 15-year span. After 20 years Ficke shuttered his "Fleet Feet" retail store. He now operates a pizzeria in Centennial, Colorado—known as "Big Bill's New York Pizza"—which was opened in 1995. Ficke runs a fundraiser known as the “9/11 Day of Giving” in which the proceeds from the pizzeria go to cancer research foundations in Colorado. Ficke and his son, Dan Ficke, run the JoAnn B. Ficke Cancer Foundation which was established following the death of JoAnne Ficke from lymphoma in 2009.
