= 1988 CBA All-Star Game (December) =

1988-89 CBA organised All-Star Game

1988-89 CBA All-Star Game
CBA All-Stars	Rockford Lightning
97	103
- Date: December 31, 1988
- Venue: Rockford Metrocenter, Rockford
- MVP: Dwayne McClain
- Attendance: 6,572
- Network: ESPN

The 1988-89 Continental Basketball Association All-Star Game was the 27th All-Star Game organised by the league since its inception in 1949 and the 9th under the name of CBA. It was held at the Rockford Metrocenter in Rockford, Illinois on December 31, 1988, in front of 6,572 spectators. The hosts Rockford Lightning defeated the CBA All-Stars 103–97.

Dwayne McClain of Rockford Lightning was named the MVP.

The CBA All-Stars were selected by the league's twelve coaches, including at least one representative from each team, excluding the hosts, Rockford Lightning. The game was televised by ESPN.

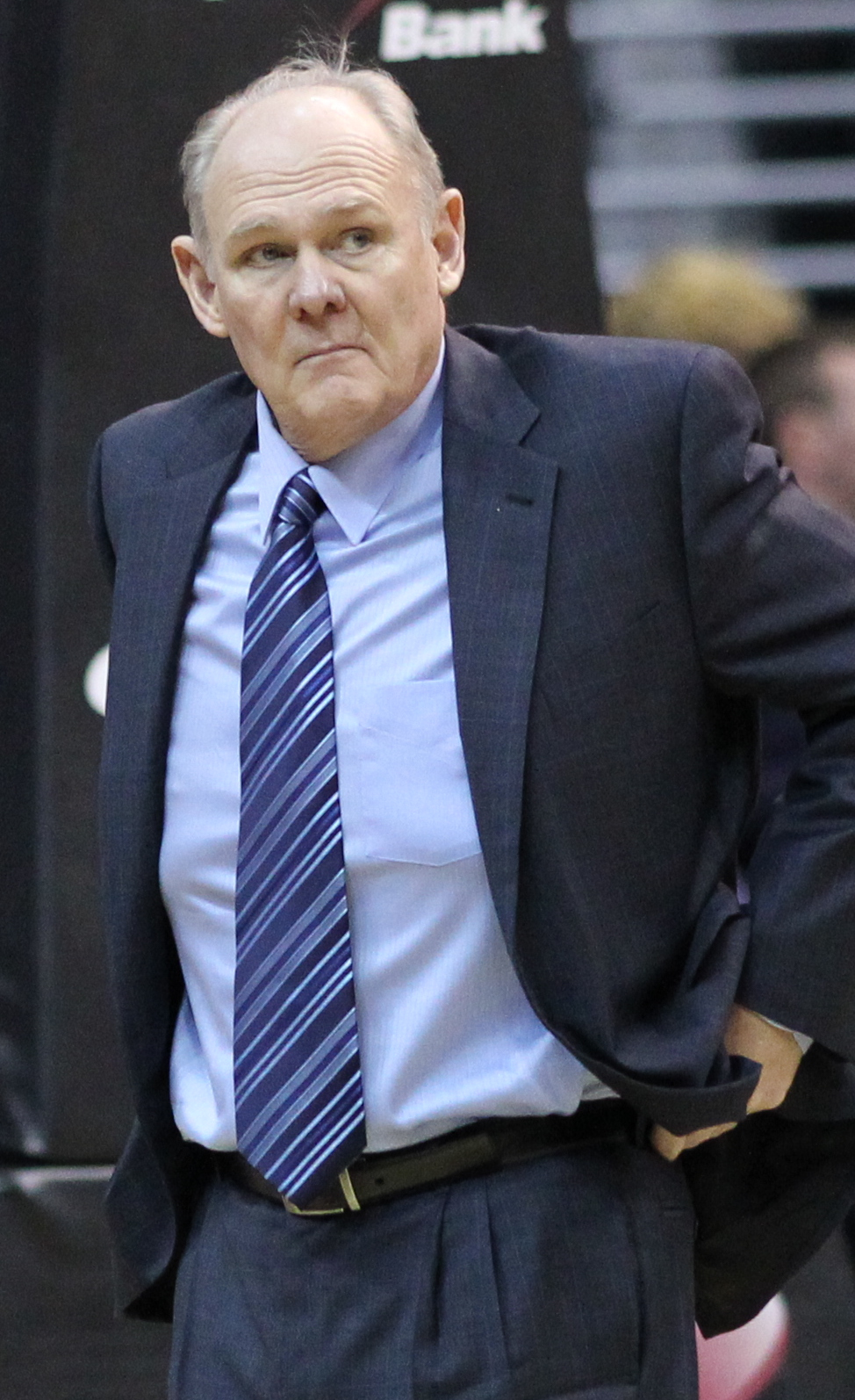
George Karl was elected to coach the CBA All-Stars

== The 1988-89 CBA All-Star Game ==
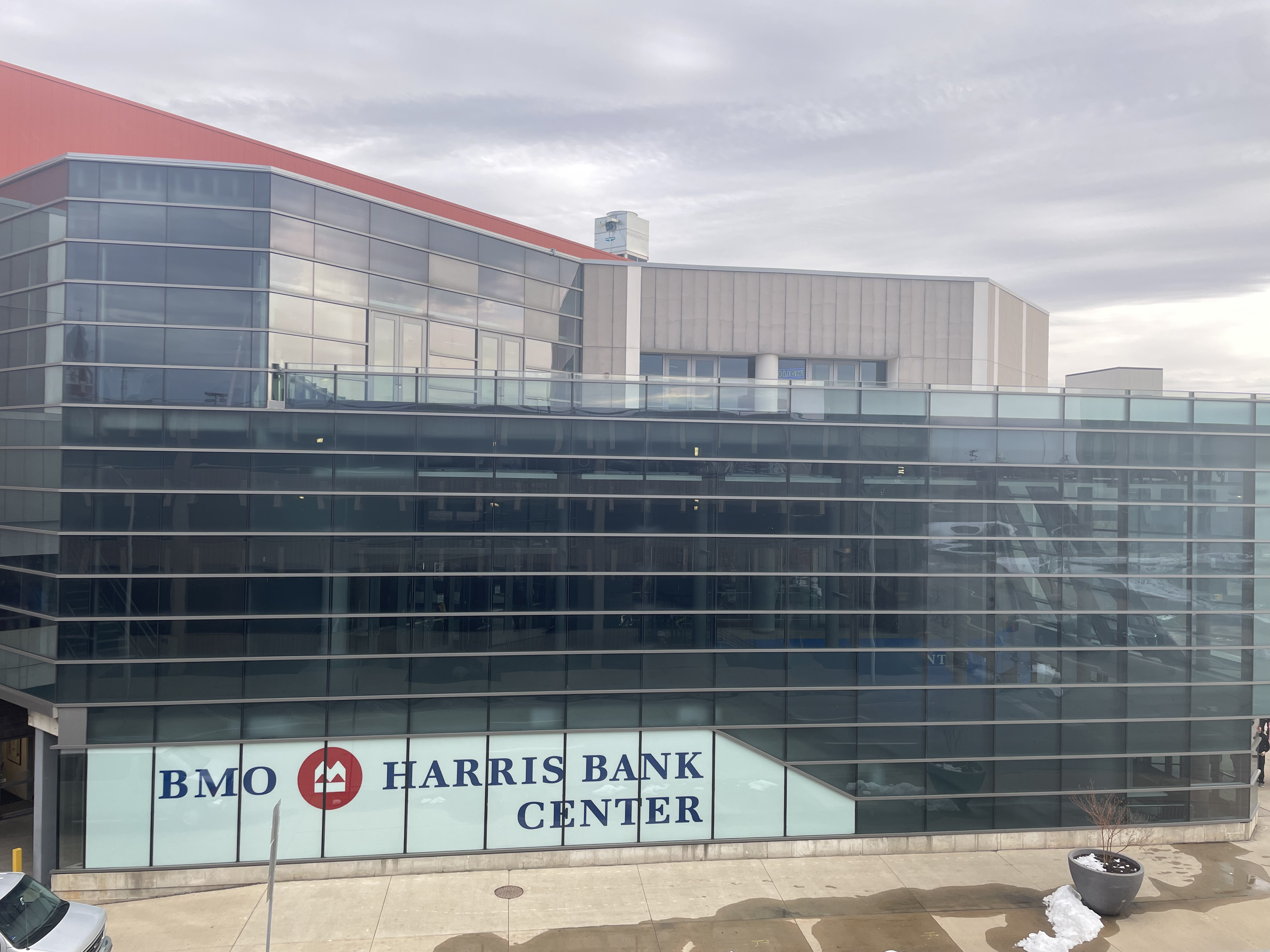
The Rockford Metrocenter in 2024

=== Slun-dunk contest ===
Daren Queenan of Charleston Gunners was the winner.

=== The Game ===
Dwayne McClain of the Rockford Lightning was the top scorer of the match with 21pts for the CBA All-Stars.

== All-Star teams ==
=== Rosters ===
Rockford Lightning
Pos.	Player	Previous Appearances
Team
G	(United States) Dwayne McClain	
F	(United States) Pace Mannion	
C	(United States) Jim Lampley	1987
C	(United States) David Wood	
F	(United States) Derrick Lewis	
G	(United States) Fred Cofield	
G	(United States) Kenny Natt	1987
F	(United States) Anthony Simms	
F	(United States) Darrell Gadsden	
G	(United States) Curtis Green	
F	(United States) Otis Jennings	
Head coach: (United States) Charley Rosen

CBA All-Stars
Pos.	Player	Team	Previous appearances
Starters
G	(United States) Todd Mitchell	Rapid City Thrillers	
F	(United States) Bobby Lee Hurt	Wichita Falls Texans	
F	(United States) Andre Turner	La Crosse Catbirds	
G	(United States) Carlton McKinney	Topeka Sizzlers	
C	(United States) John Stroeder	Albany Patroons	
Reserves
F	(United States) Bill Jones	Quad City Thunder	
F	(United States) Vincent Askew	Albany Patroons	
F	(United States) Ron Spivey	Tulsa Fast Breakers	
F	(United States) Daren Queenan	Charleston Gunners	
F	(United States) (Republic of Ireland) Ron Rowan	Cedar Rapids Silver Bullets 1987, 1988	
G	(United States) Bryan Warrick	Rochester Renegade	1987
C	(United States) Jerome Henderson	Pensacola Tornados	
Alternates
F	(United States) Ken Johnson	Albany Patroons	
Head coach: George Karl (Albany Patroons)

=== Result ===
Team 1	Score	Team 2
Rockford Lightning	103- 97	CBA All-Stars

== Awards ==
MVP	Topscorer	Slam-Dunk champion
(United States) Dwayne McClain	(United States) Dwayne McClain	(United States) Jamie Waller

== See also ==
- 1988 CBA All-Star Game
- Continental Basketball Association

== Sources ==
- HISTORY OF THE CBA ALL STAR GAME
