= Ron Kellogg =

American basketball player (born 1962)

Personal information
- Born: December 16, 1962 (age 63) Omaha, Nebraska, U.S.
- Listed height: 6 ft 5 in (1.96 m)
- Listed weight: 190 lb (86 kg)

Career information
- High school: Omaha Northwest (Omaha, Nebraska)
- College: Kansas (1982–1986)
- NBA draft: 1986: 2nd round, 42nd overall pick
- Drafted by: Atlanta Hawks
- Position: Shooting guard

Career history
- 1986–1987: Topeka Sizzlers
- 1987–1988: Savannah Spirits
- 1989–1990: Omaha Racers
- 1990–1991: Topeka Sizzlers / Yakima Sun Kings

Career highlights
- 2× First-team All-Big Eight (1985, 1986)
- Stats at Basketball Reference
Medals
Men's basketball
Representing United States
Summer Universiade
| Silver medal – second place | 1985 Kobe | National team |

Ronald Allison Kellogg Jr. (born December 19, 1962) is a retired American college and professional basketball player, best known for his college days as a left-handed sharpshooter for the successful Larry Brown-coached Kansas Jayhawks teams of the mid-1980s. Though he graduated one season before the NCAA implemented the three-point field goal, his propensity for sinking deep two-pointers earned him a reputation as one of the premier long-range shooters of his era in the Big Eight Conference. A 6’5” (1.96 m) swingman born in Omaha, Nebraska, he was drafted by the Atlanta Hawks of the NBA and played professionally in the CBA.

== College ==
Kellogg enrolled at Kansas in 1982 after a standout career at Northwest High School in Omaha, where he was a three-time all-state selection and was recruited by over 150 colleges before choosing KU over Iowa, Colorado, Nebraska, and Creighton. He played sparingly as a freshman under head coach Ted Owens, averaging 3.9 points on 41.0% shooting from the field in just over ten minutes per game. Though he showed only modest improvement as a sophomore in 1983–84, averaging 6.1 points per game on 43.4% shooting, the departure of Owens and the arrival of Brown prior to that season marked the beginning of a basketball revival on the Jayhawk campus.

As a junior in 1984–85, Kellogg was plugged into the starting small forward position opposite heralded freshman Danny Manning, giving the Jayhawks a highly productive combination at forward. Kellogg would thrive in the starting role, leading the team in scoring at 17.6 points per game on 57.6% shooting – an extremely high percentage for a perimeter player, especially given his significant number of field goal attempts from what today would be three-point territory. During one memorable stretch of Saturday games that season, he scored 30 points against Wichita State, 31 against Colorado, 39 against Nebraska, 34 against Memphis State, and 34 against Oklahoma. According to Kellogg, his performance in the Nebraska game, in which he hit 16 of his 19 shots from the field and all seven of his free throws en route to establishing a new Devaney Center scoring record, was inspired when "[m]y ex-girlfriend walked in[to the arena] with her boyfriend. That kind of teed me off. I wanted to prove a point after I saw that." Meanwhile, his exploits in KU's 82–76 upset victory over Oklahoma, which included 14-of-19 shooting from the field and seven of his team's final 11 points in the last 1:53, were chronicled in a feature article in the March 4, 1985 issue of Sports Illustrated entitled "Kellogg Went Snap! Crackle! Pop!" (an allusion to the popular Kellogg's-brand Rice Krispies breakfast cereal). Although the Jayhawks were eliminated by Auburn in the second round of the NCAA tournament, Kellogg's scoring feats earned him a selection to the All-Big Eight first team. He was also awarded All-District 5 honors by the USBWA and, following the season, was named to the U.S. men's basketball team at the 1985 World University Games.

Kellogg's senior year in 1985–86 proved to be one of the most successful seasons in Kansas basketball history. With "Special K" moving to shooting guard alongside fellow Omaha native Cedric Hunter, and Manning sharing the frontcourt with 7'1" future NBA pivotman Greg Dreiling, the versatile Calvin Thompson, and super-sub Archie Marshall, the Jayhawks boasted one of the most talented lineups in the country. The team did not disappoint, rolling to a 35–4 record and earning a trip to the 1986 Final Four in Dallas, where they suffered a 71–67 defeat at the hands of Duke. Despite the loss, Kellogg played well in his final career game, engaging in a scoring duel with Blue Devil star Johnny Dawkins and keeping the Jayhawks in the game with 22 points on 11-of-15 shooting. Kellogg finished the season as the team's second-leading scorer behind Manning at 15.9 points per game on 55.2% field goal shooting, and was again selected to the All-Big Eight first team. He concluded his Jayhawk career with 1,508 points, a total which currently places him 17th on KU's all-time scoring list.

== Professional ==
Following his career at Kansas, Kellogg was selected in the second round of the 1986 NBA draft, going to the Atlanta Hawks with the 42nd overall pick. He was traded to the Los Angeles Lakers in a draft-day deal, but failed to make the Lakers roster and never appeared in an NBA game. He signed on with the Topeka Sizzlers of the Continental Basketball Association, where he would be reunited with former KU teammates Thompson and Hunter. During his second season with the Sizzlers, his teammates also included former KU and Boston Celtics star Jo Jo White, who was 41 years old at the time, and New York City playground legend Lloyd Daniels. Kellogg also played for the Omaha Racers, Savannah Spirits and Yakima Sun Kings in four CBA seasons, averaging 11.5 points in 147 games. After leaving the CBA, Kellogg pursued a career in business and now coaches high school basketball in Baton Rouge.

== Legacy ==
Kellogg's claim to fame was his silky left-handed jump shot, which netted him a reputation as the best shooter in Nebraska prep history and one of the greatest ever to wear a Jayhawk uniform. When the Omaha World-Herald asked four scouts to recall Kellogg's game as part of a 2008 retrospective, each of them responded with the same two words: "incredible shooter". This sentiment was shared by Chuck Woodling of the Lawrence Journal-World, who claimed that "in nearly four decades of watching KU basketball players I've never seen a more accurate shooter than Ron Kellogg." Kansas head coach Bill Self, a graduate assistant on the 1985–86 KU team, describing a shooting drill at practice in which the players would launch 30 to 35 jump shots from the elbow within a five-minute span, recalled, "On the fourth day we ran it, Ronnie finally missed one. Do you hear me? He went three consecutive days in a rapid-fire shooting drill without missing!"

During his KU career, both Kellogg's basketball talents and his colorful persona were the subjects of entertaining writeups in Sports Illustrated. In the magazine's 1985–86 college basketball preview, he was characterized as "a streak shooter who gets so worked up when he's hot that he sometimes forgets the score, the time remaining and the law of averages. . . . [He] thinks he's open even when someone's hanging on his arms." His shot selection was summarized courtesy of coach Larry Brown: "I'm always yelling, 'No! No! . . . Great shot!'" In another column, he was labeled a "born flake" who, during a critical time-out in a game against Memphis State his junior year, allegedly told a bewildered Brown, "Coach, we need to fix the whirlpool." The magazine later reported that Kellogg, along with fellow seniors Thompson and Dreiling, showed up for his final home game at Allen Fieldhouse wearing a tuxedo.
