= John Killilea =

American basketball coach and scout

Personal information
- Born: June 28, 1928
- Died: January 27, 1996 (aged 67) Denver, Colorado, U.S.
- Listed height: 6 ft 7 in (2.01 m)

Career information
- College: Boston University (1949–1952)
- NBA draft: 1952: undrafted

Career history

Coaching
- 1953–1972: High schools
- 1972–1978: Boston Celtics (assistant)
- 1977–1984: Milwaukee Bucks (assistant)
- 1983–1986: New Jersey Nets (assistant)
- 1986–1988: Topeka Sizzlers
- 1989–1994: Houston Rockets (assistant)

Career highlights
- As Assistant Coach: 3× NBA Champion (1974, 1976, 1994)

John P. Killilea (June 19, 1928 – January 27, 1996) was an American basketball coach and scout. He served as the assistant coach to four National Basketball Association (NBA) team; the Boston Celtics (1972–77), the Milwaukee Bucks (1977–1983), the New Jersey Nets (1983–85), the Houston Rockets (1989–1993). Killilea was hired by the Topeka Sizzlers of the Continental Basketball Association (CBA) as their head coach in 1986 and served in that capacity until he was fired in January 1988 after being called for 15 technical fouls and ejected from three games.

== Early life ==
Killilea graduated from Quincy High School in Quincy, Massachusetts in 1945. Following his graduation, he joined the United States Army Infantry Branch. Killilea enrolled at Boston University in 1948. He was named captain of the freshman basketball team.

In 1949, Killilea was diagnosed with bulbar polio. During his hospital stay, which was paid in full by the March of Dimes, he was quarantined for 14 days. Upon his release from the hospital, Killilea was medically cleared to try out for the varsity Boston University basketball team. He made the team and came off the bench for the first two games of the season, but was inserted into the starting lineup for the remainder of the season.

In 1952, Killilea graduated from Boston University with a degree in physical education.

== Coaching career ==
Killilea's first basketball coaching job was at Pemetic High School in Southwest Harbor, Maine in 1952. The following year, he coached the team to the Eastern Maine Basketball Championship. Killilea was head coach of the Melrose and Silver Lake high school basketball teams. He was inducted into the Massachusetts Basketball Coaches Association's Hall of Fame in 1976. His combined high school head coaching record was 314–90.

Killilea was the first person in the Boston Celtics organization to scout Larry Bird. According to Killilea, Bird was "the best passing forward since Rick Barry."

In 1977, Don Nelson was hired as head coach of the Milwaukee Bucks. Nelson at first suggested his former assistant coach with the Celtics, John Killilea, for the job. When the Bucks insisted they wanted Nelson at the head coach position he brought Killilea on as his assistant. United Press International reporter Michael V. Uschan wrote an article on March 20, 1981, titled "Nelson matures as Bucks coach". It noted that, "Nelson depends on Killilea more than most other NBA coaches depend on their assistants". Killilea's salary with the Bucks was reportedly an annual salary of $60,000 to $70,000, a figure he claimed was comparable to an NBA head coaching salary.

"To have success in a competitive world you have to be an egoist. But you don't have to be an ass"

— John Killilea, The Bangor Daily News, 1981

Killilea resigned his position with Milwaukee at the conclusion of the 1983 season. He attended the Milwaukee Pen and Mike Club luncheon in 1984 and was quoted as saying, "There was no love lost between myself and the Milwaukee basketball team. [...] I guess we [Nelson] didn't get along." Bucks owner Jim Fitzgerald released a statement in March 1984 which read in part, "The Bucks offered John Killilea more loyalty, support and patience up front and behind the scenes than John Killilea will ever know. Don Nelson supported John in every possible way, but in several instances was repaid with disheartening lack of loyalty."

Before the 1983–84 season, Killilea joined the New Jersey Nets as an assistant coach under Stan Albeck. After the season a New York Post report cited several anonymous Nets players who blamed their poor performance on an ongoing feud between Killilea and assistant coach Herman Kull. Nets' owner Joe Taub and head coach Stan Albeck approached the Post reporter, Steve Baronfeld, telling him that Kull suffered a heart attack after reading the story. The Post responded by pulling their reporters from the Nets' beat.

An August 1983 United Press International report described Killilea as, "one of the most defense-minded coaches in the [NBA]."

Killilea was hired as the head coach for the Topeka Sizzlers of the Continental Basketball Association (CBA) in July 1986. His combined win–loss record with Topeka was 39–45. Killilea was fired in January 1988 and replaced by his assistant coach, John Darr. Killilea coached Topeka to a 13–17 record during the 1987–88 season and was called for 15 technical fouls.

Killilea died of cardiac arrest while boarding a flight in Denver, Colorado.
