= Kendall Stephens =

American-Australian basketball player

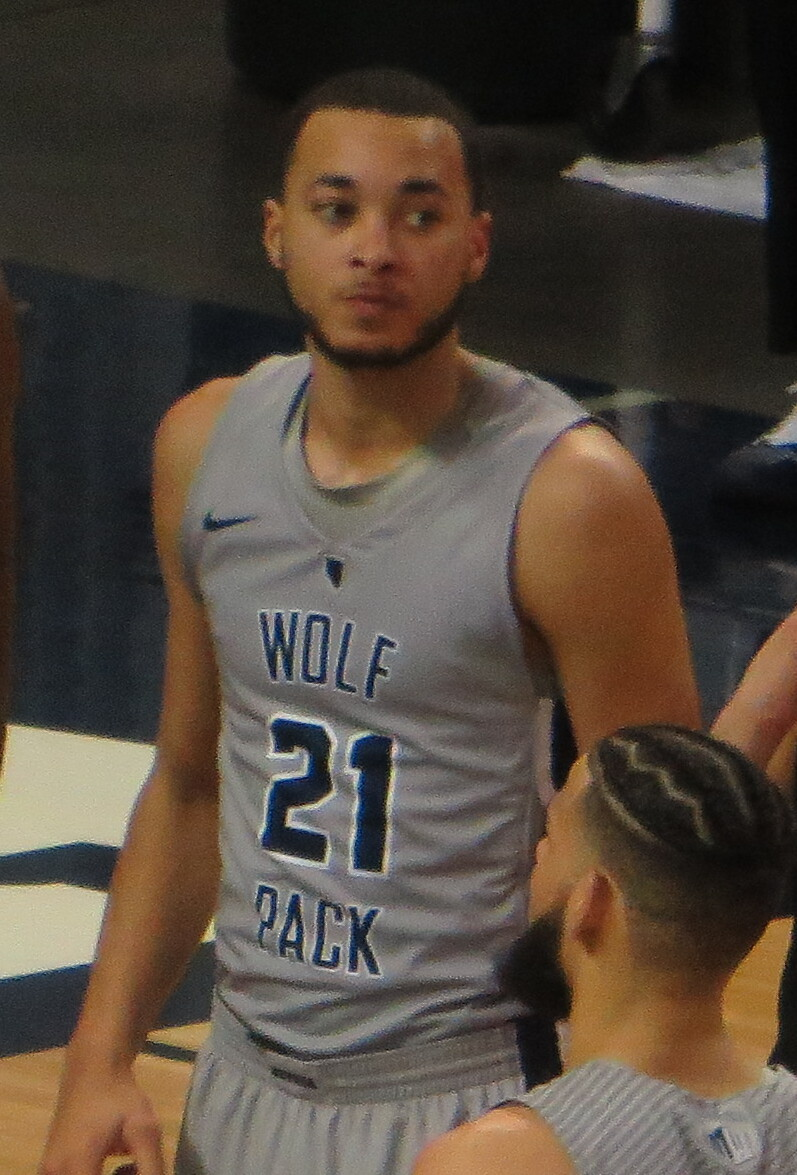

Personal information
- Born: November 11, 1994 (age 32) Whittington, Victoria
- Listed height: 6 ft 7 in (2.01 m)
- Listed weight: 205 lb (93 kg)

Career information
- High school: St. Charles East (St. Charles, Illinois)
- College: Purdue (2013–2016); Nevada (2017–2018)
- NBA draft: 2018: undrafted
- Playing career: 2018–present
- Position: Guard

Career history
- 2018–2019: Obradoiro
- 2019–2021: South East Melbourne Phoenix
- 2022–2023: Rapla KK
- 2024: União Corinthians
- 2024: Santos del Potosí

Career highlights
- Third-team All-MWC (2018); Big Ten All-Freshman team (2014)

Kendall Everette Stephens (born November 11, 1994) is an American-Australian professional basketball player for União Corinthians of the Novo Basquete Brasil. He played college basketball at Purdue and Nevada.

== Early life and high school ==
Stephens was born in Geelong, Victoria, in the suburb of Whittington, while his father Everette Stephens was playing professional basketball for the Geelong Supercats of the Australian NBL. Stephens' family settled in St. Charles, Illinois after Everette's retirement and he attended St. Charles East High School. He was a standout basketball player for the Fighting Saints and was the number 65-ranked recruit in his class by ESPN and a four-star recruit by most major recruiting outlets. He ultimately committed to play for his father's alma mater, Purdue University, during his sophomore year. During his junior year, Stephens averaged 17.7 points and 7.5 rebounds per game and was averaging 19.2 points per game during his senior season before it was cut short due to injury after 11 games.

== College career ==
=== Purdue ===
Stephens began his career at Purdue University, playing there for three seasons. In his freshman season, Stephens averaged 8.0 points per game (second in the conference among freshman) and was named to the 2014 Big Ten All-Freshman team. As a sophomore, he averaged 8.7 points per game while playing through several injuries. After his junior season, Stephens opted to transfer to Nevada after a significant drop in playing time due to injuries. Stephens played 90 games for Purdue, starting 32, and scored 698 total points for an average of 7.8 points per game.

=== Nevada ===
After sitting out the 2016–17 season due to NCAA transfer rules, Stephens played his final collegiate season with the Wolf Pack. Stephens made 126 three-pointers, fifth-most in the nation and a Nevada and Mountain West Conference single-season record. He finished the season averaging 13.1 points per game, fourth-best on the team, and shot 43.2 percent from three-point range as Nevada made it to the Sweet Sixteen of the 2018 NCAA Division I men's basketball tournament. Stephens was named third team All-Mountain West by both coaches and the media at the end of the season. Over the course of his collegiate career, Stephens played in 127 games and averaged 9.3 points per game and shot 38.8 percent from three.

== Professional career ==
After going unselected in the 2018 NBA draft, Stephens played on the Orlando Magic's NBA Summer League team and averaged 3.5 points and 1.5 rebounds over four games.

=== Obradoiro ===
Stephens signed with Monbus Obradoiro of the Spanish Liga ACB on August 19, 2018. On January 19, 2019, Stephens and Obradoiro agreed to part ways after he averaged just 2.8 points in five Liga ACB games.

=== South East Melbourne Phoenix ===
Stephens signed with the South East Melbourne Phoenix of the Australian National Basketball League (NBL) on May 1, 2019, as a non-import player. Stephens averaged 4.4 points and 1.2 rebounds in 26 NBL games. He re-signed with the team on June 18, 2020. He had surgery after each of his two seasons with the Phoenix.

== Personal life ==
Stephens' father, Everette Stephens, played point guard for Purdue from 1984 to 1988 and scored over 1,000 points for the Boilermakers. Everette was a second-round pick by the Philadelphia 76ers in the 1988 NBA draft and played professionally both in the U.S. and overseas for 11 years, including stints with the Indiana Pacers and the Milwaukee Bucks.
