= Tri-City Chinook =

American basketball team

- Conference: National
- Division: Northern (1991–92); Western (1992–95)
- League: CBA
- Established: 1991
- Folded: 1995
- History: Ohio Mixers; 1982–1984; Cincinnati Slammers 1984–1987; Cedar Rapids Silver Bullets; 1988–1991; Tri-City Chinook; 1991–1995
- Arena: Tri-Cities Coliseum
- Capacity: 7,715
- Location: Kennewick, Washington
- Team colors: white, black, cyan
- Team manager: Kevin Krause
- Ownership: Mike Lundgren
- Division titles: 1 (1994)

The Tri-City Chinook were a professional basketball team based in Kennewick, Washington. They played four seasons in the Continental Basketball Association (CBA), the defunct development league for the National Basketball Association (NBA). The team reached the playoffs in every season they played, but never made it past the second round.

== History ==
In June 1991, the CBA approved the re-location of the Cedar Rapids Silver Bullets to Tri-Cities, Washington. The team had their headquarters at 7110 West Quinault in Kennewick and played at the Tri-Cities Coliseum, sharing the venue with the Tri-City Americans, an ice hockey team of the Western Hockey League. The Chinook had a state rivalry with the Yakima Sun Kings of Yakima, Washington, and were affiliated with two NBA teams, the Denver Nuggets and the Los Angeles Lakers.

At the 1991 CBA draft in Denver, Colorado the Chinook used their first pick (6th overall) on Chancellor Nichols, a forward from James Madison. Under coach Steve Hayes, the team played in the Northern Division and finished their first season with a 29–27 record, which allowed them to qualify for the first round of the CBA postseason: the team lost to the Wichita Falls Texans 102–90 in a single elimination game. The team's scoring leader was center Wayne Tinkle, who averaged a double-double with 16.6 points and 10.6 rebounds over 55 games.

In their second season the Chinook were moved to the newly formed Western Division of the National Conference, where they were competing against the Wichita Falls Texans, the Oklahoma City Cavalry and the Yakima Sun Kings. The team record worsened and after a 13–19 start, coach Steve Hayes was replaced by Calvin Duncan, who also played as a guard. Duncan improved the record, personally finishing 14–10 and the team record at the end of the regular season was 27–29, which again qualified the Chinook for the postseason. In the 1992–93 playoffs they were eliminated 3–1 by the Rapid City Thrillers. Willie Simms, a forward from Wisconsin, was the team scoring leader with an average of 17.3 points over 53 games: he was also the leading rebounder with a total of 366, while Tinkle had the better average with 9.7. A. J. Wynder was the assists leader with an average of 8.7 per game.

In November 1993 the Chinook acquired guard Alphonso Ford, who had been drafted in the 5th round (71st overall) of the 1993 draft by the Rapid City Thrillers, trading Jay Guidinger and a 7th round pick in the 1994 draft to the Thrillers. Ford, one of the NCAA Division I all-time top scorers with Mississippi Valley State, went on to average 22.8 points per game, leading the team in scoring and earning the Rookie of the Year award. Michael Anderson led the CBA in steals with a 2.7 average, and the Chinook had the best season in their history, finishing with a 34–22 record, winning the Western Division title. Coach Calvin Duncan was named the CBA Coach of the Year for the 1993–94 season, with A. J. Wynder being player-assistant coach. The team qualified for the playoffs and faced the Omaha Racers: after leading the series 2–0, they lost three games in a row and were ultimately eliminated after a 117–110 loss in the final game.

In the 1994–95 CBA season Ford further improved his scoring average with 24 points per game, while Simms contributed with 19.8 points, and forward Geoff Lear was the top rebounder with 9.4 per game. The team finished the regular season with a 32–24 record, reaching the playoffs for the fourth season in a row: this time they were able to eliminate the Rapid City Thrillers in the first round (2–0 in the series) and faced the state rivals Yakima Sun Kings in the second round. The Chinook were eliminated 3–1. The team had ranked 6th in the CBA in home game attendance in their last season with 119,493. After the end of the season, the team was disbanded in May 1995.

== Season-by-season records ==
Years	Wins	Losses	Winning percentage	Head coach(s)	Ref
1991–92	29	27	.518	Steve Hayes	
1992–93	27	29	.482	Steve Hayes (13–19), Calvin Duncan (14–10)	
1993–94	34	22	.607	Calvin Duncan	
1994–95	32	24	.571	Calvin Duncan	

== All-time roster ==
- Alphonso Ford
- Michael Anderson
- Milton Bell
- David Booth
- Mark Buford
- Jeffty Connelly
- Willie Davis
- Neil Derrick
- Terry Dozier
- Calvin Duncan
- Eric Dunn
- Daren Engellant
- Jo Jo English
- J. J. Eubanks
- Roy Fisher
- Alphonso Ford
- John Glavan
- Pervires Greene
- Jerome Henderson
- Phil Henderson
- Ric Herrin
- Michael Holton
- Derrick Johnson
- Ken Johnson
- Steffond Johnson
- Jackie Jones
- Ozell Jones
- Geoff Lear
- Al Lorenzen
- Roy Marble
- Gary Massey
- Charles McCovery
- Darnell Mee
- Isaiah Morris
- Richard Morton
- Andrew Moten
- Chancellor Nichols
- Kenny Payne
- Alan Pollard
- Brian Quinnett
- Robert Reid
- Terry Ross
- Donald Royal
- Clifford Scales
- Willie Simms
- McKinley Singleton
- Jeff Stern
- Barry Stevens
- Kevin Stevenson
- Lamont Strothers
- Michael Tait
- Wayne Tinkle
- Andy Toolson
- Kenny Travis
- Jim Usevitch
- Jeff Webster
- Harold Wright
- Howard Wright
- A. J. Wynder
- Perry Young

== Awards ==
- CBA steals leader: Michael Anderson (1993–94)
- CBA Rookie of the Year: Alphonso Ford (1993–94)
- CBA Coach of the Year: Calvin Duncan (1993–94)
