= Herman Kull =

American basketball coach (1930–1998)

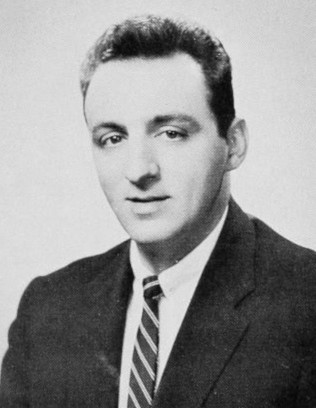
- Kull in 1959

Personal information
- Born: March 4, 1930 Newark, New Jersey, U.S.
- Died: September 16, 1998 (aged 68) Morristown, New Jersey, U.S.
- Listed height: 5 ft 8 in (1.73 m)
- Listed weight: 180 lb (82 kg)

Career information
- College: Montclair State
- Position: Assistant coach
- Coaching career: 1979–1994

Career history

Coaching
- 1959: Montclair State (GA)
- 1979–1980: Detroit Pistons (assistant)
- 1983–1985: New Jersey Nets (assistant)
- 1986: Cleveland Cavaliers (assistant)
- 1986–1988: Golden State Warriors (assistant)
- 1988–1990: Sacramento Kings (assistant)
- 1991: San Jose / Bakersfield Jammers
- 1992: Albany Patroons
- 1993–1994: Yakima SunKings
- Stats at Basketball Reference

Herman Frederick Kull (March 4, 1930 – September 16, 1998) was an American basketball coach. He served as an assistant coach in the National Basketball Association (NBA) and a head coach in the Continental Basketball Association (CBA).

== Biography ==
Kull was born on March 4, 1930, in Newark, New Jersey. He attended Montclair State University in Montclair, New Jersey and played on the men's basketball team for three seasons (1952–53, 1955–56, 1956–57). He played 31 games during his three seasons and averaged 4.5 points per game. Kull was the team's assistant coach in 1958. He was also on the school's football team and coached the baseball team in 1959. Kull coached high school basketball in New Jersey after college.

In 1979, the Detroit Pistons hired Kull as an assistant coach. He joined the coaching staff of the New Jersey Nets as an assistant to head coach Stan Albeck in 1983. Kull was hospitalized after suffering chest pains while jogging in 1984. In 1985, the Cleveland Cavaliers hired Kull as a scout. In February 1986, he was promoted to assistant coach after Mo McHone resigned. Posters given away as a promotion shortly after McHone's resignation featured Kull's head crudely affixed over McHone's body. Kull resigned his position with Cleveland in May 1986.

Before the 1985–86 season, Kull was hired by the Golden State Warriors as an assistant coach. He joined the coaching staff of the Sacramento Kings as an assistant to Jerry Reynolds in December 1988. On December 27, Reynolds collapsed during the fourth quarter of a game against the Portland Trail Blazers while protesting a call. Kull served as head coach while Reynolds received medical attention. The following day, with Reynolds hospitalized, Kull served as head coach against the Utah Jazz.

Reynolds wrote of Kull in his 2005 book Reynolds Remembers: 20 Years with the Sacramento Kings:

I needed an assistant coach so I brought in the late Herman Kull. He had been scouting for us so he knew the system and the players. He came out of New Jersey with what they called the "five-star group:" Mike Fratello, Richie Adubato, Hubie Brown, Brendan Suhr and Herman. Unfortunately Herman was the least personable of the group, which hurt his career. [...] At one point, Bill Jones, our trainer, and I told Herman that we weren't going to let him eat with us anymore if he didn't stop sending food back to the kitchen. Every meal, something was undercooked or overcooked or whatever—it took the fun out of eating. Now, Herman had good ideas as far as strategy went, and the fact the team was bad certainly wasn't his fault, but he was a piece of work.

In January 1991, the San Jose Jammers of the Continental Basketball Association (CBA), hired Kull to replace interim head coach Gary Freitas, who took over for Cory Russell on December 6, 1990. During the 1991–92 season, Kull continued to coach the Jammers, who re-located to Bakersfield, California in the off-season. The team disbanded in January 1992 as a part of Jammers owner Dominic L. Cortese's Chapter 7 bankruptcy proceedings. On February 16, 1992, the Albany Patroons of the CBA fired their head coach Charley Rosen and replaced him with Kull, who finished the season with a 5–10 record. Kevin Mackey replaced Kull the following season. In May 1993, Kull was hired by the CBA Yakima Sun Kings. He coached the team to a 7–17 record before being replaced by Mo McHone.

Kull died on September 16, 1998, in Morristown, New Jersey.
