= Ron McHenry =

American basketball player and coach

Biographical details
- Born: January 21, 1962 (age 64); Olathe, Kansas
- Education: Washburn University; Wichita State University

Playing career
- 1980–1981: Coffeyville CC
- 1981–1982: Kansas
- 1982–1984: Washburn

Coaching career (HC unless noted)

Men's basketball
- 1984–1986: Washburn (graduate assistant)
- 1986–1987: Perry–Lecompton HS (assistant)
- 1988–1989: Topeka Sizzlers (assist./interim HC)
- 1989–2000: Washburn (assistant)

Men's golf
- 1992–2000: Washburn

Women's basketball
- 2000–2022: Washburn

Head coaching record
- Overall: 490–180 (.731)

Accomplishments and honors

Championships
- NCAA Division II Tournament championship (2005); 8 MIAA regular season championships (2003–2006, 2008, 2010, 2012, 2013); 8 MIAA Tournament championships (2003–2007, 2009, 2010, 2012)

Awards
- WBCA Coach of the Year (2005); 4 MIAA Coach of the Year (2004, 2005, 2010, 2013); 2 Regional Coach of the Year (2004, 2005)

Ronald McHenry (born January 21, 1962) is an American former college women's basketball coach at Washburn University. During his 22 seasons at Washburn, he led the Ichabods to one national championship, seven conference regular season and tournament championships, and twelve NCAA tournament appearances. Prior to his current post, McHenry served as an assistant coach at a local high school, assistant and interim head coach for the Topeka Sizzlers for one season, assistant coach for the Washburn men's basketball program, as well as the men's golf coach at Washburn for eight seasons.

== Career ==
=== Early coaching career ===
Born on January 21, 1962, in Olathe, Kansas, McHenry began his college basketball career as a player for the Coffeyville Red Ravens and Kansas Jayhawks before finishing his college career at Washburn University. After graduating from Washburn, McHenry served as a graduate assistant for the Ichabods for one season before landing a teaching and assistant coaching job at Perry-Lecompton High School. In 1988, McHenry served as the assistant coach and interim head coach for the Topeka Sizzlers of the Continental Basketball Association. After a season with the Sizzlers, McHenry returned to his alma mater as an assistant coach under Bob Chipman.

=== Washburn University ===
In May 2000, McHenry was announced as the next women's basketball coach at Washburn. During his time at Washburn, McHenry has posted a 426–127 (.770) overall record, 247–93 (.726) conference record, and has won eight conference regular season championships, seven conference tournament championships, and one NCAA Division II Tournament championship.

He retired after the 2021–22 season.

== Head coach record ==
Record table
Season	Team	Overall	Conference	Standing	Postseason
Washburn Ichabods (Mid-America Intercollegiate Athletics Association) (2000–present)
2000–01	Washburn	13–14	7–11	7th	
2001–02	Washburn	23–7	14–4	2nd	NCAA regional quarterfinals
2002–03	Washburn	30–4	15–3	1st	NCAA Elite Eight
2003–04	Washburn	25–6	15–3	T–1st	NCAA regional semifinals
2004–05	Washburn	35–2	16–2	1st	NCAA tournament champions
2005–06	Washburn	32–1	16–0	1st	NCAA Regional finals
2006–07	Washburn	29–4	15–3	2nd	NCAA Regional finals
2007–08	Washburn	26–7	14–4	1st	NCAA Elite Eight
2008–09	Washburn	27–5	16–4	2nd	NCAA regional semifinals
2009–10	Washburn	27–4	17–3	1st	NCAA regional semifinals
2010–11	Washburn	22–7	17–5	2nd	NCAA regional quarterfinals
2011–12	Washburn	29–5	18–2	1st	NCAA regional semifinals
2012–13	Washburn	23–6	16–2	1st	NCAA regional quarterfinals
2013–14	Washburn	16–11	11–8	6th	
2014–15	Washburn	16–12	8–11	8th	
2015–16	Washburn	15–14	11–11	7th	
2016–17	Washburn	17–12	10–9	7th	
2017–18	Washburn	20–10	11–8	T–6th	
2018–19	Washburn	20–10	14–5	T–3rd	
Washburn:		446–141 (.760)	261–91 (.741)		
Total:		446–141 (.760)			
National champion Postseason invitational champion Conference regular season champion Conference regular season and conference tournament champion Division regular season champion Division regular season and conference tournament champion Conference tournament champion
