= 1988 CBA All-Star Game =

The 1988 CBA All-Star Game can refer to either:

- 1988 CBA All-Star Game (January) – held on January 20, 1988, pertaining to the 1987–88 Continental Basketball Association season
- 1988 CBA All-Star Game (December) – held on December 31, 1988, pertaining to the 1988–89 Continental Basketball Association season
