= Calvin Duncan =

American basketball player and pastor

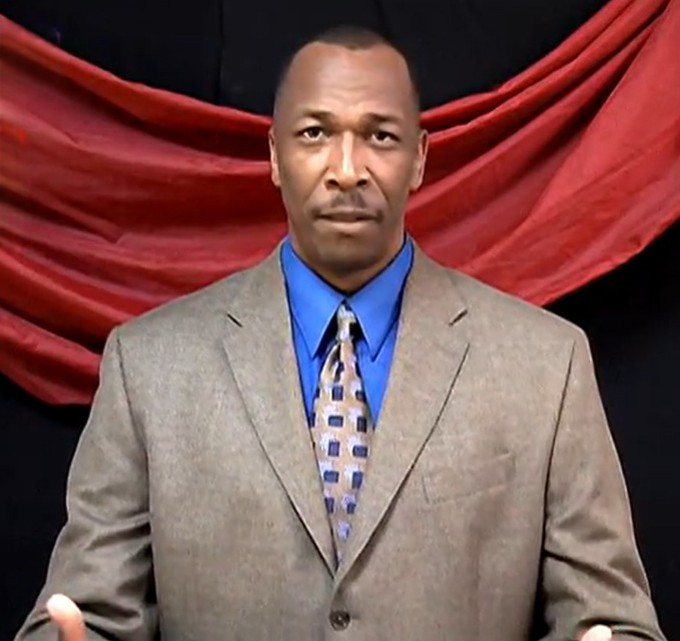
- Duncan in 2009

Personal information
- Born: March 21, 1961 (age 65) South Boston, Virginia, U.S.
- Listed height: 6 ft 4 in (1.93 m)
- Listed weight: 195 lb (88 kg)

Career information
- High school: Linden (Linden, New Jersey); Oak Hill Academy (Mouth of Wilson, Virginia)
- College: VCU (1981–1985)
- NBA draft: 1985: 2nd round, 30th overall pick
- Drafted by: Cleveland Cavaliers
- Position: Shooting guard

Career history
- 1990–1993: Cedar Rapids Silver Bullets / Tri-City Chinook

Career highlights
- Sun Belt co-Player of the Year (1983); 2× First-team All-Sun Belt (1983, 1984); Second-team All-Sun Belt (1985)
- Stats at Basketball Reference

Calvin Anthony Duncan (born March 21, 1961) is an American pastor and former professional basketball player. Duncan is pastor at the Faith & Family Church in Richmond, Virginia. He also played basketball with Oak Hill Academy and the Virginia Commonwealth University Rams. He was drafted in the 1985 NBA draft in the 2nd round with the 30th overall pick by the Cleveland Cavaliers, then was traded by the Cleveland Cavaliers with Charles Oakley to the Chicago Bulls for Keith Lee and Ennis Whatley, but instead of signing, he joined Athletes in Action, an evangelical Christian traveling team.

== Basketball ==
During the 1980–81 season, Duncan set the all-time record for points in a game for Oak Hill Academy with 61. Brandon Jennings later broke this record, tallying 63 points in a single game. He is a member of the VCU Rams Hall of Fame. With VCU, Duncan was named Sun Belt Conference co-Player of the Year as a sophomore in 1983, sharing the award with fellow sophomore Charlie Bradley of the South Florida.

After the close of his college career, Duncan was drafted by the Cleveland Cavaliers in the second round of the 1985 NBA draft (30th pick overall). He did not play in the NBA, but did play in the Continental Basketball Association (CBA) for the Cedar Rapids Silver Bullets and Tri-City Chinook.

== Personal ==
Duncan's mother died in childbirth and, with no knowledge of his father, was raised by his aunt in Linden, New Jersey. He transferred to Oak Hill Academy after his junior year at Linden High School, hoping to earn the grades that would be necessary to play Division I basketball.

At Virginia Commonwealth, Duncan earned a degree in criminal justice. He lives in Richmond, Virginia with his wife Barbara and his three children, Richard, Chelsea, and Azell.
