= Jerome Henderson (basketball) =

American basketball player (born 1959)

Personal information
- Born: October 5, 1959 (age 66) Los Angeles, California, U.S.
- Listed height: 6 ft 11 in (2.11 m)
- Listed weight: 230 lb (104 kg)

Career information
- High school: Jefferson (Los Angeles, California)
- College: Wabash Valley (1978–1979); New Mexico (1979–1981)
- NBA draft: 1981: undrafted
- Playing career: 1981–1994
- Position: Center / power forward
- Number: 23, 40

Career history
- 1981–1982: Rochester Zeniths
- 1984–1986: Detroit Spirits
- 1986: Los Angeles Lakers
- 1987: Milwaukee Bucks
- 1987–1988: Pensacola Tornados
- 1990–1991: Columbus Horizon
- 1990–1991: Grand Rapids Hoops
- 1990–1991: Rapid City Thrillers
- 1990–1991: San Jose Jammers
- 1992–1993: Oklahoma City Cavalry
- 1992–1993: Tri-City Chinook
- 1993–1994: Columbus Horizon
- 1993–1994: Rockford Lightning

Career highlights
- CBA All-Defensive Team (1988); 2× CBA All-Defensive First Team (1986, 1987)
- Stats at NBA.com
- Stats at Basketball Reference

Jerome D. Henderson (born October 5, 1959) is an American former professional basketball power forward–center who played two seasons in the National Basketball Association (NBA) as a member of the Los Angeles Lakers (1985–86) and the Milwaukee Bucks (1986–87). He attended the University of New Mexico.

Henderson played in the Continental Basketball Association (CBA) for the Rochester Zeniths, Detroit Spirits, Pensacola Tornados, Columbus Horizon, Grand Rapids Hoops, Rapid City Thrillers, San Jose Jammers, Oklahoma City Cavalry, Tri-City Chinook and Rockford Lightning from 1981 to 1994. He was selected to the CBA All-Defensive Team in 1988 and All-Defensive First Team in 1986 and 1987.

== Career statistics ==
Legend
GP	Games played	GS	Games started	MPG	Minutes per game
FG%	Field goal percentage	3P%	3-point field goal percentage	FT%	Free throw percentage
RPG	Rebounds per game	APG	Assists per game	SPG	Steals per game
BPG	Blocks per game	PPG	Points per game	**Bold**	Career high

=== NBA ===
==== Regular season ====
Year	Team	GP	GS	MPG	FG%	3P%	FT%	RPG	APG	SPG	BPG	PPG
1985–86	L.A. Lakers	1	0	3.0	**.667**	–	–	1.0	.0	.0	.0	**4.0**
1986–87	Milwaukee	**6**	0	**6.0**	.308	–	**1.000**	**1.2**	.0	**.2**	**.2**	2.0
Career		7	0	5.6	.375	–	1.000	1.1	.0	.1	.1	2.3

==== Playoffs ====
Year	Team	GP	GS	MPG	FG%	3P%	FT%	RPG	APG	SPG	BPG	PPG
1987	Milwaukee	1	0	1.0	–	–	–	.0	.0	.0	.0	.0
