= Loren Ferré =

Current position
- Title: Athletic director
- Team: Washburn
- Conference: The MIAA

Biographical details
- Education: Texas Christian University (1971); North Texas State University (1982)

Administrative career (AD unless noted)
- 1978–1980: North Texas State (event coord.)
- 1980–1990: North Texas State (associate AD)
- 1990–1996: Black Hills State
- 1996–present: Washburn

Accomplishments and honors

Awards
- Central Region Athletic Director of the Year (2005)

Loren Ferré is an American university sports administrator, currently serving as athletic director at Washburn University. Ferré has served at Washburn, an NCAA Division II sports program, since February 1996.

== Early career ==
Ferré graduated from Texas Christian University in 1971 and completed his master's degree from North Texas State University in 1982. After graduating from North Texas State, Ferré began his athletic career at the North Texas State as an event coordinator, a post he held from 1978 to 1980. In 1980, he was promoted to associate athletic director, a position he served until 1990. In 1990, Ferré moved to Spearfish, South Dakota to become the athletic director for the Black Hills State Yellow Jackets. While at Black Hills State, Ferré also served as the Donald E. Young Sports Fitness Center director. Ferré was named athletic director at Washburn University in December 1995.

== Washburn University ==
On December 20, 1995, Washburn University announced that Ferré as the next athletic director. During his time at Washburn, Ferré has increased the number of scholarships and departmental fundraising, making those two things his top priority. Since 1996, Ferré has led Washburn sports programs to 28 Mid-America Intercollegiate Athletics Association conference championships and 58 NCAA Division II appearances.

Ferré was named the 2005 Central Region Athletic Director of the Year.

== Personal life ==
Ferré is married to his wife, Sarah, and has two daughters.
