= Lee Arena =

Basketball venue in Topeka, Kansas

- Schendel Court at Lee Arena
- Interactive map of Lee Arena
- Location: 1700 SW College; Topeka, Kansas 66621
- Coordinates: 39.03372°N 95.698836°W
- Owner: Washburn University
- Operator: Washburn University
- Capacity: 4,150
- Surface: Grade 1, one-inch thick, northern hardwood maple

Construction
- Opened: 1984

Tenants
- Washburn Ichabods (NCAA) (1984–present); Topeka Sizzlers (CBA) (1986–1987)

Lee Arena serves as the home to the Washburn Ichabods men's and women's basketball, as well as the women's volleyball team. The arena draws some of the largest crowds in NCAA Division II. The arena was the first in the MIAA to have a video board and a digital scorer's table.

The arena holds 4,150 and in 2012 it became the first in the Mid-America Intercollegiate Athletics Association and one of the first in NCAA Division II to feature a digital scorer's table. Along with a video board connected to the facility's scoreboard, the Daktronics equipment has the capabilities to show video, graphics, statistics and other features.

The most recent major renovation to Lee Arena added second-story office and meeting rooms that overlook the court. The McPherson Booster Room was also built. The room gives donors and other special guests a great view of the court and a place to gather and socialize.

All three sports that play in Lee Arena have had tremendous success throughout its history and all three have hosted numerous NCAA postseason events. The volleyball team hosted the NCAA national championship in 2007 and the men's basketball team has hosted the NCAA regional tournament five times, the last in 2001. The women's basketball team most recently hosted the regional tournament in 2012 and has been host five times as well. The 1993 NCAA II Women’s Elite Eight was also played in Lee Arena.

The concourse around Lee Arena features a ticket booth, concession stands and restrooms. Locker rooms for the three sports, as well as softball and baseball are located in the building as well.

Lee Arena was built as part of the $8.4 million Kelsey H. and Edna B. Petro Allied Health Center, the largest building on campus covering more than 126,000 square feet. The arena is named after former Washburn baseball coach and player, Bob Lee and his wife, Sallee, to recognize their $250,000 donation.
