= Tharon Mayes =

American basketball player (born 1968)

Personal information
- Born: September 9, 1968 (age 58) New Haven, Connecticut, U.S.
- Listed height: 6 ft 3 in (1.91 m)
- Listed weight: 175 lb (79 kg)

Career information
- High school: Hillhouse (New Haven, Connecticut)
- College: Florida State (1987–1990)
- NBA draft: 1990: undrafted
- Playing career: 1990–2000
- Position: Shooting guard
- Number: 25, 8

Career history
- 1990–1991: Sioux Falls Skyforce
- 1991: New Haven Skyhawks
- 1991: Philadelphia 76ers
- 1991: Sioux Falls Skyforce
- 1992: Los Angeles Clippers
- 1992: Sioux Falls Skyforce
- 1992–1993: Castors Braine
- 1993: Purefoods TJ Hotdogs
- 1993: Grand Rapids Hoops
- 1994: Fargo-Moorhead Fever
- 1994–1995: Breogán Lugo
- 1995–1996: Rhöndorfer TV
- 1996: Florida Sharks
- 1996: Formula Shell Zoom Masters
- 1996: Hapoel Tsfat
- 1997: Yakima Sun Kings
- 1997–1998: Covirán Sierra Nevada
- 1998–1999: Recreativos Orenes Murcia
- 1999–2000: Hapoel Holon
- 2000: San Diego Stingrays

Career highlights
- CBA All-Star (1991); CBA All-Rookie Team (1991)

Career NBA statistics
- Points: 99 (4.1 ppg)
- Rebounds: 16 (0.7 rpg)
- Assists: 35 (1.5 apg)
- Stats at NBA.com
- Stats at Basketball Reference

Tharon Rex Mayes (born September 9, 1968) is an American former professional basketball player. Born in New Haven, Connecticut, USA, he was listed at 6'3" tall and weighed 175 lbs.

== Career ==
Mayes played collegiate ball with the Florida State University Seminoles (1987–1990). He scored 1260 points (16.4 ppg) for Florida State and had a total of 132 steals. Scoring 23.3 points per game in the 1989-90 campaign, he put up the third-best season scoring average in FSU history. In the team's media guide, Mayes was described as "a defensive terror because of his lightning-quick hand". In January 1990, he was suspended indefinitely after an altercation with a parking meter patrolman.

He played the majority of his professional basketball career in the CBA for the Sioux Falls Skyforce (1990–1992), Grand Rapids Hoops (1993), Fargo-Moorhead Fever (1993–1994) and Yakima Sun Kings (1997). In 1990–91, Mayes scored 25.1 points per contest for the Skyforce, making him the third leading scorer of the CBA season. His 1354 points this season were the most in a single season in franchise history. Mayes was selected to the CBA All-Rookie Team in 1991. He participated in the NBA with brief stints with the Philadelphia 76ers (1991) and Los Angeles Clippers (1992). In the NBA, Mayes saw action in a total of 24 games, averaging 4.1 points a game.

He also played overseas in Belgium for Castors Braine (1992–1993), in the Philippines for Purefoods TJ Hotdogs (1993) and Formula Shell Zoom Masters (1996), in Germany for Rhöndorfer TV (1995–1996; with 17.7 ppg in 23 appearances, he was the team's leading scorer), in Spain for Breogán Lugo (1994–1995; 38 games: 22.6 ppg), Covirán Sierra Nevada (1997–1998; 28 games: 15.9 ppg) and Recreativos Orenes Murcia (1998–1999; 12 games: 14.2 ppg), and in Israel for Hapoel Tsfat (1996–1997) and Hapoel Holon (1999–2000; 9 games: 12.2 ppg).

After retiring, Mayes settled in Toronto and started a basketball camp. In 2003, he decided to come back to Florida State University with the goal to finish his degree in criminology. Mayes worked in youth programs in Toronto, Florida, Boston and in his hometown, where he became the sports director of the Boys & Girls Club of New Haven in 2009.

== Notable awards ==
- CBA All-Rookie (1991)
- CBA All-Star (1991)
- Named one of the 30 Greatest Players in the history of the Sioux Fall Skyforce

== Personal life ==
Mayes is the stepfather of the former Florida State player Xavier Rathan-Mayes.
