= Barry Stevens (basketball) =

American basketball player and coach

Personal information
- Born: November 7, 1963 Flint, Michigan, U.S.
- Died: February 21, 2007 (aged 43) Gary, Indiana, U.S.
- Listed height: 6 ft 5 in (1.96 m)
- Listed weight: 195 lb (88 kg)

Career information
- High school: Flint Northwestern (Flint, Michigan)
- College: Iowa State (1981–1985)
- NBA draft: 1985: 2nd round, 43rd overall pick
- Drafted by: Denver Nuggets
- Playing career: 1986–1994
- Position: Shooting guard / small forward
- Number: 35, 34

Career history
- 1986–1987: Wisconsin Flyers
- 1986–1987: Wyoming Wildcatters
- 1988–1990: Cedar Rapids Silver Bullets
- 1990–1992: Columbus Horizon
- 1991–1992: Wichita Falls Texans
- 1992–1993: Fargo-Moorhead Fever
- 1992–1993: Rockford Lightning
- 1993: Golden State Warriors
- 1993–1994: Tri-City Chinook

Career highlights
- 3x First-team All-Big Eight (1983–1985); No. 35 retired by Iowa State Cyclones
- Stats at NBA.com
- Stats at Basketball Reference

Barry Wayne Stevens (November 7, 1963 – February 21, 2007) was an American basketball player. He was born in Flint, Michigan. Stevens is the third-leading scorer in Iowa State University history.

Stevens, a 6-foot-5-inch (1.96 m) shooting guard, played professionally as well; briefly for the NBA's Golden State Warriors during 1992-93 season. Stevens played six total NBA minutes in two game appearances with the Warriors. He also played in Asia, South America and Europe.

From June 2001 to June 2002 he was both the director of basketball operations and head coach of the CBA's Gary Steelheads, lasting one season.

In February 2007, Stevens died of a heart attack while exercising in Gary, Indiana, aged 43. A celebrity all-star game was played in July 2007, in order to raise money for the Barry Stevens Foundation and the American Heart Association.
