= San Jose Sky Rockets =

U.S. basketball team

The San Jose Sky Rockets were a 2005–2006 expansion team in the American Basketball Association (ABA). The team switched leagues from the ABA to the Continental Basketball Association (CBA) over the spring of 2006 and was relocated to Minot, North Dakota.
