= Richard Morton (basketball) =

American basketball player (born 1966)

Personal information
- Born: February 2, 1966 (age 60) San Francisco, California, U.S.
- Listed height: 6 ft 3 in (1.91 m)
- Listed weight: 190 lb (86 kg)

Career information
- High school: Balboa (San Francisco, California)
- College: Cal State Fullerton (1984–1988)
- NBA draft: 1988: undrafted
- Position: Point guard
- Number: 4

Career history
- 1988: Indiana Pacers
- 1988-1989: Topeka Sizzlers
- 1989: Rochester Flyers
- 1989-1990: San Jose Jammers
- 1990: San Miguel Beermen
- 1990-1991: San Jose Slammers
- 1991-1992: Albany Patroons
- 1992-1993: Rapid City Thrillers
- 1993: Tri-City Chinook
- 1993-1994: Quad City Thunder

Career highlights
- 2x CBA All-Star (1990, 1991); 2× Second-team All-PCAA (1987, 1988)
- Stats at NBA.com
- Stats at Basketball Reference

Richard L. Morton (born February 2, 1966) is an American former professional basketball player played briefly in the National Basketball Association (NBA). Born in San Francisco, California, he was a 6'3" 190 lb (86 kg) point guard, and played college basketball at California State University, Fullerton and later played for the NBA's Indiana Pacers.

Morton played two games with the Pacers during the 1988–89 NBA season, registering six total points on 3-of-4 shooting. He spent several seasons in the Continental Basketball Association, playing for the Topeka Sizzlers, Rochester Flyers, San Jose Jammers, Albany Patroons, Rapid City Thrillers, Tri-City Chinook and Quad City Thunder from 1988 to 1994. He averaged 18.7 points and 4.1 rebounds per game for his career and was a CBA All-Star in 1990 and 1991.

Until February 2006, Morton was the head coach of the ABA's now-defunct San Francisco Pilots.

== Career playing statistics ==
Legend
GP	Games played	GS	Games started	MPG	Minutes per game
FG%	Field goal percentage	3P%	3-point field goal percentage	FT%	Free throw percentage
RPG	Rebounds per game	APG	Assists per game	SPG	Steals per game
BPG	Blocks per game	PPG	Points per game	**Bold**	Career high

=== NBA ===
==== Regular season ====
Year	Team	GP	GS	MPG	FG%	3P%	FT%	RPG	APG	SPG	BPG	PPG
1988–89	Indiana	2	0	5.5	.750	–	–	.0	.5	.0	.0	3.0
