= Everette Stephens =

American basketball player

Personal information
- Born: October 21, 1966 (age 60) Evanston, Illinois, U.S.
- Listed height: 6 ft 2 in (1.88 m)
- Listed weight: 175 lb (79 kg)

Career information
- High school: Evanston Township (Evanston, Illinois)
- College: Purdue (1984–1988)
- NBA draft: 1988: 2nd round, 31st overall pick
- Drafted by: Philadelphia 76ers
- Playing career: 1988–1999
- Position: Point guard
- Number: 15, 11, 7

Career history
- 1988–1989: Indiana Pacers
- 1989–1990: Cedar Rapids Silver Bullets
- 1990: Presto Tivolis
- 1990–1991: Rockford Lightning
- 1991: Milwaukee Bucks
- 1991–1992: Rockford Lightning
- 1992–1993: Newcastle Falcons
- 1992: Fargo-Moorhead Fever
- 1992–1993: La Crosse Catbirds
- 1994: Geelong Supercats
- 1995–1996: Bayreuth
- 1997–1998: Menorca
- 1998–1999: Ourense
- 1999: Paris SG
- 1999: Marinos de Oriente

Career highlights
- All-NBL Third Team (1992)
- Stats at NBA.com
- Stats at Basketball Reference

Everette Louis Stephens (born October 21, 1966) is an American former professional basketball player. He played college basketball for the Purdue Boilermakers and was selected by the Philadelphia 76ers in the second round (31st pick overall) of the 1988 NBA draft.

== Professional career ==
Stephens played for the Indiana Pacers in the 1988–89 season.

In the 1989–90 season, Stephens played for the Cedar Rapids Silver Bullets of the Continental Basketball Association (CBA).

In the 1990–91 season, Stephens played for the Rockford Lightning in the CBA before joining the Milwaukee Bucks in February 1991. He re-joined the Rockford Lightning for the 1991–92 season.

Stephens played for the Newcastle Falcons in the 1992 NBL season in Australia. He was named to the All-NBL Third Team.

Stephens split the 1992–93 CBA season with the Fargo-Moorhead Fever and La Crosse Catbirds. He then re-joined the Newcastle Falcons for the 1993 NBL season. He returned to Australia to play for the Geelong Supercats in 1994 NBL season.

In the 1995–96 season, Stephens played for Bayreuth in Germany. He played for Menorca in Spain in 1997–98, then returned to Spain for the 1998–99 season to play for Ourense. He finished the 1998–99 season with Paris SG in France. His final stint came in 1999 with Marinos de Oriente in Venezuela.

== Personal life ==
Stephens' son, Kendall, played basketball at St. Charles East High School in suburban Chicago and played College Basketball at Purdue University and University of Nevada, Reno. Stephens served as an assistant coach for his son's team.

== Career statistics ==
Legend
GP	Games played	GS	Games started	MPG	Minutes per game
FG%	Field goal percentage	3P%	3-point field goal percentage	FT%	Free throw percentage
RPG	Rebounds per game	APG	Assists per game	SPG	Steals per game
BPG	Blocks per game	PPG	Points per game	**Bold**	Career high

=== NBA ===
==== Regular season ====
Year	Team	GP	GS	MPG	FG%	3P%	FT%	RPG	APG	SPG	BPG	PPG
1988–89	Indiana	**35**	0	**6.0**	.319	**.200**	.773	**.7**	**1.1**	**.3**	**.1**	1.9
1990–91	Milwaukee	3	0	2.0	**.667**	–	**1.000**	.0	.7	.0	.0	**2.0**
Career		38	0	5.7	.333	.200	.792	.6	1.0	.2	.1	1.9
