= Calvin Thompson =

American basketball player and coach

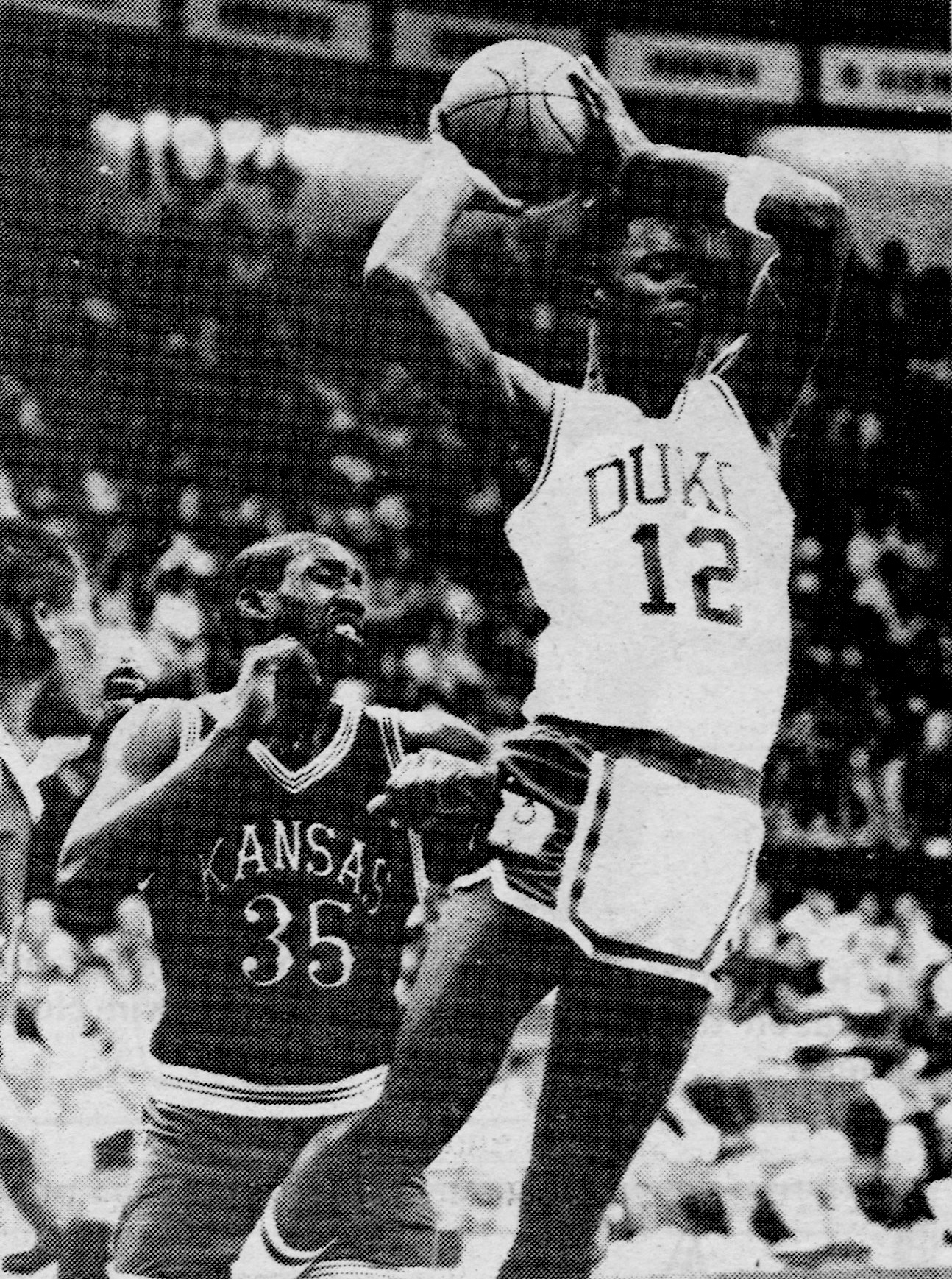
- Thompson (left) in the 1986 Final Four

Personal information
- Born: June 27, 1964 (age 62) Kansas City, Kansas, U.S.
- Listed height: 6 ft 6 in (1.98 m)
- Listed weight: 205 lb (93 kg)

Career information
- High school: Wyandotte (Kansas City, Kansas)
- College: Kansas (1982–1986)
- NBA draft: 1986: 4th round, 71st overall pick
- Drafted by: New York Knicks
- Playing career: 1986–1995
- Position: Shooting guard
- Coaching career: 1995–present

Career history

Playing
- 1986–1988: Topeka Sizzlers
- 1987: Formula Shell Spark Aiders
- 1988–1989: Salon de Provence
- 1990–1991: Chalon sur Saone
- 1991–1992: Elitzur Givat Shmuel
- 1993–1995: Maccabi Netanya

Coaching
- 1995–1996: Missouri Mustangs
- 2018: Kansas City Tornadoes
- 2018–present: Topeka Sizzlers
- Stats at Basketball Reference

Calvin Thompson (born June 27, 1964) is an American basketball coach and a member of the University of Kansas' 1986 Final Four team. He holds Kansas' record for most consecutive free throws made at 33 in 1983–84, made second-team All-Big Eight in 1983 and 1984, and the All-Big Eight Tournament team 1983 and 1984. He was also a member of the 1986 All-NCAA Midwest Regional team.

== Playing career ==
On June 17, 1986, the New York Knicks selected Thompson in Round 4 with Pick 1 in the 1986 NBA draft.

Calvin played two seasons in the Continental Basketball Association (CBA) after brief stints in camp with the Los Angeles Clippers, Indiana Pacers, Chicago Bulls, and the San Antonio Spurs.

After spending time in camp with the Spurs he was offered a contract by the Houston Rockets and Lyon out of France. He chose to venture to France where he played professionally for two years, then another five years in Israel.

Thompson finished his college career tied for first for games started and games played in a season, third in minutes played, fourth in scoring, fifth in assists, seventh in steals, 13th in blocks, and 19th in rebounds in Kansas Jayhawk history.

During his first CBA season where he averaged 21 ppg, and 5 rebounds per game, he was named CBA Rookie Runner-Up Of The Year and he was the first rookie to be named to the CBA's All Star Game. In May 1987 (CBA off-season) participated with Formula Shell in the Philippines. He averaged 42 points and 8 rebounds per game.

== Coaching career ==
Thompson coached the Kansas City Mustangs of the Women's Basketball Association professional league in 1995.

After retiring, he founded Hoop Service Bulldogs (now the Junior Sizzlers), which play under the ThreeFive, Inc. umbrella, a not-for-profit entity based out of Kansas City for both boys and girls grade 3–11.

In 2018, he was the coach of the Kansas City Tornados professional team in the North American Premier Basketball.

In June 2018, Thompson purchased the rights of the Topeka Sizzlers of the semi-pro league American Basketball Association (ABA). He will service as both the Head Coach and General Manager of the team. Prior to the Covid pandemic, the Sizzlers were relocated to the Kansas City area and now play independently as the KC Sizzlers (www.kcsizzlers.org).
