= Peter Thibeaux =

American basketball player (born 1961)

Personal information
- Born: October 3, 1961 (age 65) Los Angeles, California, U.S.
- Listed height: 6 ft 7 in (2.01 m)
- Listed weight: 210 lb (95 kg)

Career information
- High school: Skyline (Oakland, California)
- College: Saint Mary's (1979–1983)
- NBA draft: 1983: 4th round, 77th overall pick
- Drafted by: Golden State Warriors
- Position: Small forward
- Number: 7

Career history
- 1983–1984: Toronto Tornados
- 1984–1986: Golden State Warriors
- 1988–1989: Tulsa Fast Breakers
- 1989–1990: EBBC Den Bosch
- 1990–1991: Cedar Rapids Silver Bullets

Career highlights
- First-team All-Eredivisie (1990); CBA champion (1989); 2× All-CBA Second Team (1989, 1991)
- Stats at NBA.com
- Stats at Basketball Reference

Peter C. Thibeaux (TEE-BOH; born October 3, 1961) is an American former professional basketball player who played two seasons in the National Basketball Association (NBA) as a member of the Golden State Warriors. He was drafted by the Warriors in the fourth round (77^{th} pick overall) from Saint Mary's College of California.

Thibeaux played in the Continental Basketball Association (CBA) for the Toronto Tornados during the 1983–84 season, the Tulsa Fast Breakers during the 1988–89 season and the Cedar Rapids Silver Bullets during the 1990–91 season. He won a CBA championship with the Fast Breakers in 1989. He was selected to the All-CBA Second Team in 1989 and 1991.

In the 1989–90 season, Thibeaux played in the Dutch Eredivisie for EBBC Den Bosch.

== Career statistics ==
Legend
GP	Games played	GS	Games started	MPG	Minutes per game
FG%	Field goal percentage	3P%	3-point field goal percentage	FT%	Free throw percentage
RPG	Rebounds per game	APG	Assists per game	SPG	Steals per game
BPG	Blocks per game	PPG	Points per game	**Bold**	Career high

=== NBA ===
==== Regular season ====
Year	Team	GP	GS	MPG	FG%	3P%	FT%	RPG	APG	SPG	BPG	PPG
1984–85	Golden State	**51**	1	9.0	**.482**	.000	**.642**	1.4	.3	.2	.3	4.5
1985–86	Golden State	42	**8**	**12.6**	.429	**.400**	.604	**1.8**	**.7**	**.5**	**.4**	**5.5**
Career		93	9	10.7	.453	.286	.626	1.5	.5	.4	.3	5.0
