= Ozell Jones =

American professional basketball player

Personal information
- Born: November 20, 1960 St. Paul, Minnesota, U.S.
- Died: September 7, 2006 (aged 45) Lancaster, California, U.S.
- Listed height: 6 ft 11 in (2.11 m)
- Listed weight: 235 lb (107 kg)

Career information
- High school: Long Beach Polytechnic (Long Beach, California)
- College: Wichita State (1979–1981); Cal State Fullerton (1982–1984)
- NBA draft: 1984: 4th round, 90th overall pick
- Drafted by: San Antonio Spurs
- Playing career: 1984–1994
- Position: Center / power forward
- Number: 8, 20

Career history
- 1984–1985: San Antonio Spurs
- 1985–1986: Mulat Napoli
- 1986: Los Angeles Clippers
- 1986–1987: Cincinnati Slammers
- 1987: Miami Tropics
- 1987–1988: Quad City Thunder
- 1988: Miami Tropics
- 1989–1990: Tulsa Fast Breakers
- 1993–1994: Tri-City Chinook
- 1994–1995: Oklahoma City Cavalry

Career highlights
- USBL champion (1987); CBA All-Star (1990); All-CBA Second Team (1990); CBA All-Defensive Team (1990); CBA blocks leader (1990)
- Stats at NBA.com
- Stats at Basketball Reference

Ozell "Hoppy" Jones III (November 20, 1960 – September 7, 2006) was an American professional basketball player. He was listed at 6 ft 11 in (2.11 m) and weighed 235 pounds (107 kg). Born in St. Paul, Minnesota, his family soon moved to Compton, California, and later to Long Beach, California, so that he could play high school basketball at Long Beach Polytechnic.

Jones first played college basketball with the Wichita State University (1979–1981) and helped the "Shockers" reach the Elite 8 in his second year. He later transferred to Cal State Fullerton to play for the "Titans" in 1982–1984. He entered the 1984 NBA draft and was chosen in the fourth round (90th pick overall) by the San Antonio Spurs. On 24 October 1985, he was waived by the Spurs. He later signed as a free agent with the Los Angeles Clippers on March 31, 1986, but played in only three games.

After his time in the NBA, he played overseas in Italy (1986–1987) then spent the rest of his professional career playing in the Continental Basketball Association (CBA) for the Cincinnati Slammers (1986–1987), Quad City Thunder (1987–1988), Tulsa Fast Breakers (1989–1990), Tri-City Chinook (1993–1994) and Oklahoma City Cavalry (1994–1995). Jones was selected as a CBA All-Star as well as being named to the All-CBA Second Team and All-Defensive Team in 1990.

He also participated in the USBL with two spells for the Miami Tropics in 1987, where he won a championship, and 1988. After retiring from basketball, he operated a big and tall men's clothing store in Lancaster, California.

== Death ==
On 7 September 2006, Jones was found by relatives shot dead in his apartment. He was 45 years old. According to police reports, he bled to death from a single gunshot wound to the upper torso. The investigation on this case remains open.

== Career statistics ==
Legend
| GP | Games played | GS | Games started | MPG | Minutes per game |
| FG% | Field goal percentage | 3P% | 3-point field goal percentage | FT% | Free throw percentage |
| RPG | Rebounds per game | APG | Assists per game | SPG | Steals per game |
| BPG | Blocks per game | PPG | Points per game | **Bold** | Career high |

=== NBA ===
==== Regular season ====
| Year | Team | GP | GS | MPG | FG% | 3P% | FT% | RPG | APG | SPG | BPG | PPG |
|---|---|---|---|---|---|---|---|---|---|---|---|---|
| 1984–85 | San Antonio | **67** | **6** | **13.3** | **.589** | .000 | **.398** | **3.6** | **.8** | .4 | **.9** | **3.7** |
| 1985–86 | L.A. Clippers | 3 | 0 | 6.0 | .000 | – | – | .7 | .0 | **.7** | .3 | .0 |
| Career | | 70 | 6 | 12.9 | .582 | .000 | .398 | 3.4 | .8 | .5 | .8 | 3.5 |

==== Playoffs ====
| Year | Team | GP | GS | MPG | FG% | 3P% | FT% | RPG | APG | SPG | BPG | PPG |
|---|---|---|---|---|---|---|---|---|---|---|---|---|
| 1985 | San Antonio | 5 | 0 | 14.6 | .727 | – | .167 | 3.4 | .8 | .2 | .8 | 3.4 |
