= Jim Rowinski =

American basketball player (1961–2024)

Personal information
- Born: January 4, 1961 Long Island, New York, U.S.
- Died: February 1, 2024 (aged 63) Fort Lauderdale, Florida, U.S.
- Listed height: 6 ft 8 in (2.03 m)
- Listed weight: 260 lb (118 kg)

Career information
- High school: Syosset (Syosset, New York)
- College: Purdue (1980–1984)
- NBA draft: 1984: 4th round, 86th overall pick
- Drafted by: Utah Jazz
- Position: Power forward / center
- Number: 41, 11, 50

Career history
- 1988: Long Island Knights
- 1988–1989: Topeka Sizzlers
- 1989: Detroit Pistons
- 1989: Philadelphia 76ers
- 1989–1990: Topeka Sizzlers
- 1990: Miami Heat
- 1990–1991: Yakima Sun Kings
- 1991: CB Breogán
- 1991–1992: BC Castors Braine
- 1991–1992: Yakima Sun Kings
- 1992: Long Island Surf
- 1992–1994: Karşıyaka
- 1995: Long Island Surf
- 1995: Miami Tropics
- 1995: Memphis Fire
- 1995–1996: Yakima Sun Kings
- 1997: Long Island Surf

Career highlights
- 2× All-CBA First Team (1990, 1991); CBA rebounding leader (1991); Chicago Tribune Silver Basketball (1984); First-team All-Big Ten (1984)
- Stats at NBA.com
- Stats at Basketball Reference

James Rowinski (January 4, 1961 – February 1, 2024) was an American professional basketball player. He played college basketball for the Purdue Boilermakers. He later played professionally for almost two decades, including in Italy, Belgium, Spain, Turkey and the USA.

== College career ==
Rowinski, a 6'8" 260 lb center, attended Purdue University. Along with standout freshman and fellow center, Russell Cross, he helped lead the Boilermakers to a 21–11 record and to a third-place finish in the NIT under first year head coach, Gene Keady. During his sophomore season at Purdue, Jim helped them to an NIT Finals appearance. In his Junior season, he led Purdue to the second round of the 1983 NCAA Tournament. After Russell Cross left for the NBA after his junior season, Rowinski became the starting center for the Boilermakers. During his senior season, he led the Boilers to a Co-Big Ten Conference title, a berth in the 1984 NCAA Tournament and an overall record of 22–7 for the season, averaging 15 points a game on the season. Jim was named First Team All-Big Ten and was also selected a team co-MVP with point guard, Ricky Hall. He was rewarded the Chicago Tribune Trophy, which is given the Big Ten's Most Valuable Player. He is one of three Purdue players to have been awarded this trophy; along with Rick Mount (1969, 1970) and Glenn Robinson (1994) were also recipients.

== Professional career ==
Jim Rowinski was drafted by the Utah Jazz in the fourth round of the 1984 NBA draft. He started his professional career playing in Europe and in the CBA. He eventually began his NBA career in March 1989 with the Detroit Pistons and on through to 1990 with the Philadelphia 76ers and the Miami Heat. His NBA career lasted 23 games over two seasons, where he averaged 2.5 points and 1.5 rebounds a game, along with an 84.4 percent at the free throw line and a 41.7 field goal percentage.

Rowinski played in the Continental Basketball Association (CBA) for the Topeka Sizzlers from 1988 to 1990 and the Yakima Sun Kings from 1990 to 1992 and during the 1995–96 season. He was selected to the All-CBA First Team in 1990 and 1991.

== Death ==
Rowinski died on February 1, 2024, at the age of 63.

== Career statistics ==
Legend
GP	Games played	GS	Games started	MPG	Minutes per game
FG%	Field goal percentage	3P%	3-point field goal percentage	FT%	Free throw percentage
RPG	Rebounds per game	APG	Assists per game	SPG	Steals per game
BPG	Blocks per game	PPG	Points per game	**Bold**	Career high

=== NBA ===
==== Regular season ====
Year	Team	GP	GS	MPG	FG%	3P%	FT%	RPG	APG	SPG	BPG	PPG
1988–89	Detroit	6	0	1.3	.000	–	**1.000**	.3	.0	.0	.0	.7
1988–89	Philadelphia	3	0	2.3	**.500**	–	.500	1.0	.0	.0	.0	1.0
1989–90	Miami	**14**	0	**8.0**	.438	–	.846	**2.1**	**.4**	**.1**	**.1**	**3.6**
Career		23	0	5.5	.417	–	.844	1.5	.2	.0	.1	2.5
