= Bakersfield Jammers =

- Conference: National
- League: CBA
- Founded: 1988
- Folded: 1991
- History: San Jose Jammers (1989–1991); Bakersfield Jammers (1991–92)
- Location: San Jose, California (1989–1991); Bakersfield, California (1991–92)
- Team colors: red, black, white

The Bakersfield Jammers, known originally as the San Jose Jammers, were an American professional basketball team that were members of the Continental Basketball Association (CBA) from 1989 to 1992. Originally based in San Jose, California, the team relocated to Bakersfield, California for their final season.

The team was created by former Oakland A's executive Fred Kuenzi through a CBA basketball league expansion. Although Fred was initially named as team spokesman and introduced as the team's first general manager, he had previous commitments that prohibited him from remaining on in that capacity. He served as a team consultant. Fred obtained capital investment funding by bringing in former assemblyman Dominic L. Cortese as majority owner. The Jammers' inaugural roster included high-scoring guards Freddie Banks (Las Vegas Silver Streaks) and Butch Hays, forward David Boone, and center Casey Crawford.

San Jose Jammers games were broadcast on radio station KSJX.

== Season-by-season records ==
Year	W	L	Pct.	Reg. season	Playoffs
1989–90	23	33	.411	3rd, National Western	National Conference Semifinals
1990–91	21	35	.375	3rd, National Western	Did not qualify
1991–92	16	7	.696	4th, National Southern	N/A

== All-time roster ==
- Leonard Allen
- Larry Anderson
- Freddie Banks
- Scooter Barry
- Perry Bellaire
- David Boone
- Jay Burson
- Greg Butler
- Ed Catchings
- Chris Childs
- Jervis Cole
- Tank Collins
- Jean Derouillere
- Chip Engelland
- Scott Fisher
- Ray Foster
- Rod Foster
- Ben Gillery
- Butch Hays
- Jerome Henderson
- Conner Henry
- Marchell Henry
- Keith Hill
- Steffond Johnson
- Steve Key
- Bryan Kirkland
- Kenny McClary
- Ben McDonald
- Scott Meents
- Levy Middlebrooks
- Richard Morton
- Antwahn Nance
- Terry Ross
- Kelby Stuckey
- Jon Taylor
- Leonard Taylor
- Darren Tillis
- Mark Tillmon
- Kenny Travis
- John Tresvant
- Kelvin Upshaw
- Joe Wallace
- Pearl Washington
- Dan Williams
- Sam Williams
- Mike Yoest
- Gus Gonidakis

== See also ==
- Bakersfield Jam – <n NBA D-League team that played from 2006 to 2016
- San Jose Sky Rockets
- San Jose Spiders
