= Cedar Rapids Silver Bullets =

Former NBA Basketball team

- Conference: Western (1988–89)
- Division: Central (1989–1991)
- League: CBA
- Established: 1988
- Folded: 1991
- History: Ohio Mixers; 1982–1984; Cincinnati Slammers; 1984–1987; Cedar Rapids Silver Bullets; 1988–1991; Tri-City Chinook; 1991–1995
- Arena: Five Seasons Center
- Capacity: 7,200
- Location: Cedar Rapids, Iowa
- Team colors: silver, red, blue, white
- Main sponsor: Coors Light, Kum & Go
- President: Kevin Krause
- Ownership: Krause Gentle

The Cedar Rapids Silver Bullets were a professional basketball team based in Cedar Rapids, Iowa from 1988 to 1991. They played in the Continental Basketball Association (CBA), the defunct development league for the National Basketball Association (NBA).

== History ==
=== Cincinnati Slammers relocation ===
The franchise was purchased for an undisclosed amount by Krause Gentle, the parent company of Kum & Go convenience stores. The company announced their intentions to relocate the team to Cedar Rapids, Iowa. The team's 1988-89 schedule was printed on soda cups that were sold at Kum & Go locations. The name "Silver Bullets" was chosen because the team was sponsored by Coors Light, which marketed the "silver bullet can".

=== Cedar Rapids (1988–1991) ===
The Silver Bullets played their home games at the 7,200 seat Five Seasons Center (now U.S. Cellular Center). Kevin Krause, whose father owned the team through their parent company Krause Gentle, served as the team's president.

Lewis Lloyd, who was banned from playing in the National Basketball Association (NBA) due to a violation of their drug policy, sought a court injunction in 1988 to allow him to play in the CBA after his contract with the Cedar Rapids Silver Bullets was rejected by CBA commissioner Jay Ramsdell. Lloyd had been participating in the league's rehabilitation program and qualified for reinstatement on March 19. 1989, but through his lawyer challenged the legality of the CBA's drug policy. On December 21, 1988 Linn County, Iowa District Judge William Thomas ruled that the CBA had a right to bar players who had a history of drug use. Ramsdell testified at the hearing that the CBA did not test for cannabis during their drug screenings.

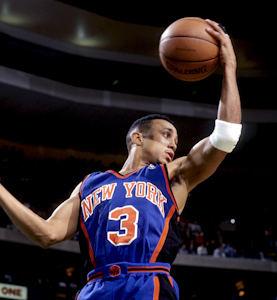
John Starks (pictured in 1996) was a CBA All-Star with the Silver Bullets during the 1989–1990 season.

On December 30, 1989, Rockford Lightning head coach Charley Rosen was arrested in Cedar Rapids for assaulting Silver Bullets head coach George Whittaker. Rosen was restrained from attacking Whittaker on the court by referees and ejected from the game. After Cedar Rapids posted a 119–98 victory over the Lightning, Rosen met Whittaker in the hallway outside of the Silver Bullets locker room and struck him in the neck and shoulder. According to the Associated Press, Rosen was angry that Whittaker's team was running up the score. As a result of the altercation, the CBA suspended Rosen eight games and fined him an undisclosed amount. In April 1990, Rosen pleaded guilty to the misdemeanor assault charge.

The 1991 CBA All-Star Game was held in Cedar Rapids, Iowa on January 18. The game was sponsored by LA Gear, who announced on the broadcast that they were the official shoe of the CBA. John Starks appeared in the 1990 CBA All-Star Game as a member of the Silver Bullets. During a game late in the season, Starks pushed a referee which led his suspension from the CBA. Starks would eventually become an NBA All-Star with the New York Knicks in 1994.

Bimm Ridder Sportswear, an athletic apparel manufacturer, got its start making products for the Silver Bullets and the Minor League Baseball team, the Cedar Rapids Reds.

=== Relocation to Tri-Cities, Washington ===
In June 1991, the CBA approved the re-location of the Cedar Rapids franchise to Tri-Cities, Washington. The team would later be known as the Tri-City Chinook who played their home games at Tri-Cities Coliseum in Kennewick, Washington.

== Season-by-season records ==
| Years | Wins | Losses | Winning percentage | Head coach(s) | Ref |
|---|---|---|---|---|---|
| 1988–89 | 30 | 24 | .555 | Gary Youmans | |
| 1989–1990 | 25 | 31 | .446 | George Whittaker | |
| 1990–91 | 24 | 32 | .428 | George Whittaker (2–5); Steve Bontrager (22–27) | |

== All-time roster ==
- Randy Allen
- Anthony Blakley
- Boot Bond
- Mel Braxton
- Brent Carmichael
- Ron Cavenall
- David Colbert
- Tommy Davis
- Joel DeBortoli
- Calvin Duncan
- Pat Durham
- Ben Gillery
- Terry Gould
- Orlando Graham
- Steve Grayer
- Ken Green
- Derrek Hamilton
- Chris Harris
- Steve Hayes
- Darryl Johnson
- Byron Larkin
- Gary Leonard
- Lewis Lloyd
- Al Lorenzen
- Roy Marble
- Anthony Martin
- Shawn McDaniel
- Jeff Moe
- Melvin Newbern
- Reggie Owens
- Ray Pugh
- Jeff Rahilly
- Ron Roberts
- Ron Rowan
- Donald Royal
- John Starks
- Everette Stephens
- Barry Stevens
- Peter Thibeaux
- Clarence Thompson
- Damon Vance
- Demone Webster
- A. J. Wynder

== Awards ==
- A. J. Wynder — CBA Player of the Week (January 5, 1989)
- John Starks — 1990 CBA All-Star and 1990 CBA Slam Dunk Contest runner-up
