= Topeka Sizzlers =

- Conference: Western (1985–87); Eastern (1987–89); National (1989–1990)
- Division: Midwest (1989–1990)
- Leagues: Continental Basketball Association
- Founded: 1985
- Dissolved: 1990
- History: Kansas City Sizzlers (1985–1986)
- Arena: Municipal Auditorium (1985–86); Lee Arena (1986–87); Landon Arena (1987–1990)
- Location: Kansas City, Missouri (1985–86); Topeka, Kansas (1986–1990)
- Team colors: Red, yellow, black
- Ownership: Bernard Glannon (1986–1988); Jim Garrett & Bonnie Garrett (1988–1990)

The Topeka Sizzlers, originally the Kansas City Sizzlers, were a professional basketball team based in Kansas City, Missouri from 1985 to 1986 until they relocated to Topeka, Kansas where they played from 1986 to 1990. The Sizzlers were members of the Continental Basketball Association (CBA).

Bernard Glannon purchased a new CBA franchise on June 28, 1985 which he nicknamed the "Sizzlers". During their first and only season in Kansas City the team played their home games at Municipal Auditorium. Citing the over-saturated sports market in Kansas City, Glannon re-located the Sizzlers to Topeka, Kansas before the 1986–87 season. The team used Lee Arena on the campus of Washburn University while construction of Landon Arena was completed.

A group of 14 investors led by married business partners Jim & Bonnie Garrett purchased the Topeka Sizzlers from Glannon before the 1988–89 season. The Garretts put the team up for sale during the 1989–1990 season. A group of investors led by Sacramento, California attorney Robert Wilson purchased the Sizzlers and re-located them to Washington. The Yakima Sun Kings, as the Topeka franchise would become known during the 1990–91 season, went on to win several CBA championships during their 18-year existence.

A lawsuit was filed by the Garretts in 1991 alleging Glannon misrepresented the value of the Sizzlers franchise. The Shawnee County, Kansas District Court jury who heard the original case sided with Glannon and a judgement was issued in his favor for the remainder owed to him by the Garretts ($205,000). The Kansas Court of Appeals upheld the jury's judgment in 1992.

== History ==
=== Kansas City (1985–86) ===
Kansas City businessman Bernard Glannon announced on June 27, 1985 that he had worked out a deal to purchase an expansion franchise in the Continental Basketball Association (CBA) for $500,000. CBA owners approved the expansion franchise, named the "Sizzlers", during a conference call vote on June 28 following two weeks of negotiations between Glannon and CBA president Jim Drucker.

The Kansas City Council unanimously approved a five-year lease of Municipal Auditorium by the Sizzlers in July 1985. The auditorium was the home of the Kansas City Kings who had relocated to Sacramento, California following the 1984–85 National Basketball Association (NBA) season.

During the first CBA college draft in 1985 the Sizzlers were awarded the first overall pick. They selected guard Regan Truesdale from The Citadel, The Military College of South Carolina. On August 5, 1985 the CBA held an expansion draft for the Sizzlers. The 13 other CBA franchises were able to protect five of the 13 players on their rosters. Bill Ficke was hired to be the Sizzlers head coach from the 1985–86 season.

By November 1985 the Sizzlers had sold over 1,400 season tickets according to The Sacramento Bee. The Los Angeles Daily News reported that Kansas City was acting as the Los Angeles Lakers farm team. After the Lakers cut center Earl Jones, head coach Pat Riley told the Daily News that if Earl cleared waivers then he would sign with the Sizzlers "where he can keep a hand in with us".

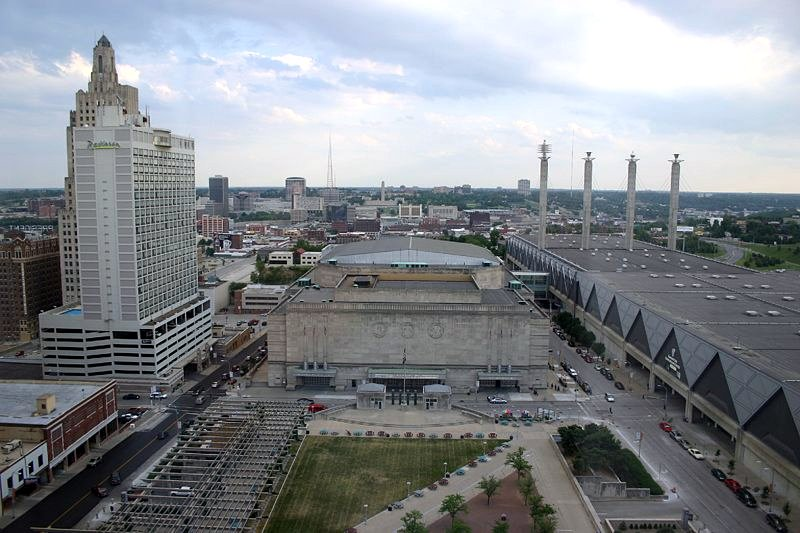
During their only season in Kansas City, Missouri the Sizzlers used Municipal Auditorium as their home venue. Average attendance was 2,820 people a game in a venue with over 7,000 seats.

The Sizzlers' home opener in December 1985 at Municipal Auditorium drew an attendance of 7,012, which at the time was the seventh largest crowd in CBA history. After nine home games the Sizzlers were averaging an attendance of 3,186, which was second in the CBA.

The Federal Deposit Insurance Corporation (FDIC) filed a lawsuit against Sizzlers owner Bernard Glannon in January 1986 for his alleged delinquent payment on a loan for his defunct venture, the Indian Springs State Bank, which was eventually revealed to have dealings with organized crime members. Glannon claimed that the FDIC had only filed the lawsuit on his behest to settle.

During a game on January 8, 1986 Danny Salisbery of the Detroit Spirits made a CBA record 70-foot shot to beat the third quarter buzzer against Kansas City.

On January 9, 1986 the Sizzlers acquired center Petur Gudmundsson from the Tampa Bay Thrillers. By the end of January the United States Immigration and Naturalization Service (INS) ruled that Gudmundsson, a citizen on Iceland in the United States on a H-1 visa, was ineligible to work in country and had to cease playing for the Sizzlers. Kansas City argued that Gudmundsson was exempt from INS rules on employment due to the specialty of his profession, but the INS ultimately rejected that argument. INS District Director Ron Sanders said that for Gudmundsson to be classified as "an alien of distinguished merit and ability" he would have to be in the NBA, not the CBA.

Kansas City were eliminated from playoff contention following the 1985–86 season, however, the Evansville Thunder were disqualified from the playoffs for failing to meet their financial obligation to the CBA and the Sizzlers were invited to participate in Evansville's place. A court order was later sought by Evansville who claimed they had met their obligation and the CBA, who had no right to disqualify them from the playoffs. A restraining order was issued by the judge in the case prohibiting the playoff series to continue until a hearing could be held. Evansville's restraining order was ultimately lifted and the series between Kansas City and Cincinnati was allowed to continue.

=== Topeka (1986–1990) ===
The United Press International (UPI) reported in February 1986 that the Sizzlers were looking to re-locate to Topeka, Kansas where there was less competition in the entertainment market. At that point their attendance at Kansas City's Municipal Auditorium was 2,820 spectators a game. The 10,000 seat Kansas Expocentre was nearing completion in Topeka, which at the time had no professional sports teams. Kansas City had the Kansas City Chiefs (football), the Comets (indoor soccer), the Royals (baseball) and the Sizzlers. UPI reported that the Sizzlers' use of gimmicks, including two appearances by the San Diego Chicken, would draw increased attendance but games that featured no such gimmicks had anemic crowds.

Topeka Mayor Doug Wright announced in April 1986 that a lease agreement was being negotiated with the Sizzlers. Wright said that the city was seeking to lease Lee Arena from Washburn University while construction on the Kansas Expocentre wrapped up. At the time Sizzlers public relations director Bruce Carnahan remained cool on the idea, telling the UPI that Topeka was just one city under consideration for the franchise relocation. Carnahan also said there was a possibility the team would stay in Kansas City for the 1986–87 CBA season. On May 19 the official announcement was made by the CBA that the Sizzlers were moving to Topeka, Kansas where they would play at Lee Arena until they could move into the Kansas Expocentre which was nearing completion.

John Killilea was hired as Topeka's head coach on July 1, 1986. Killilea was the assistant coach for the New Jersey Nets of the NBA during the 1985–86 season and got his start coaching in 1972 as an assistant for Tom Heinsohn on the Boston Celtics bench.

Topeka's first game of the season was against the Albany Patroons at the Washington Avenue Armory in Albany, New York. The Patroons were coached by Phil Jackson who would go on to win several NBA Finals at the helm of the Chicago Bulls and the Los Angeles Lakers. The Sizzlers won the game 124 to 99 behind a six-for-six field goal showing from guard Ron Kellogg.

Two Sizzlers games were broadcast on national television by ESPN in 1987. The first occurred on January 19 when the Wyoming Wildcatters hosted Topeka. The second was a game in Topeka on February 16 against the Rockford Lightning. Landon Arena, also known as the Kansas Expocentre, was completed in 1987 and the Sizzlers played their first game there on March 9 in front of a crowd of 8,917 people. That set a league record for attendance which surpassed that last record of 8,537 at the 1985 CBA All-Star game in Evansville, Indiana.

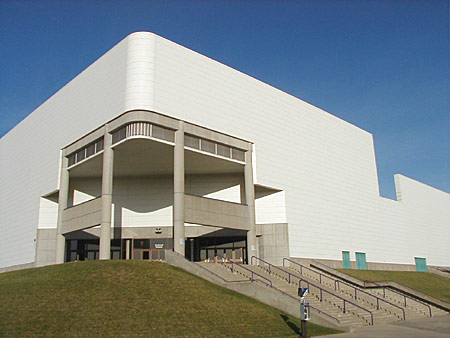
Landon Arena was completed in 1987 and hosted the 1988 CBA All-Star Game on January 23. The Topeka Sizzlers used Landon Arena as their home venue from 1987 to 1990.

The 1987 CBA All-Star Game featured three members of the Sizzlers, guards Ron Rowan and Calvin Thompson; and forward Joe Binion. Binion was named the 1986–87 CBA Most Valuable Player at the end of the season and Rowan was awarded CBA Rookie of the Year.

Going into the 1987–88 season the CBA realigned Topeka from the western to the eastern division. After CBA commissioner Carl Scheer resigned to take a job with the NBA Charlotte Hornets, Sizzlers owner Bernie Glannon along with the owners of the Savannah Spirits and the La Crosse Catbirds were members of a committee tasked with finding Scheer's replacement.

According to the Daily News of Los Angeles in 1987 the Sizzlers had a "co-operative agreement" with the Los Angeles Lakers and the Philadelphia 76ers of the NBA to develop players.

Jo Jo White signed with Topeka as a player-assistant coach in November 1987. White, who was 40, had not played professional basketball since 1981. Twenty-six days later White retired citing his age. He averaged 5.6 points per game in five games played. In 1989 White stated the comeback attempt was not his idea and he regretted it because the damage he sustained to his knees.

The 1988 CBA All-Star Game took place in Topeka, Kansas at the Landon Arena. The all-stars faced-off against the Sizzlers on January 23. Topeka lost the game to the CBA All-Stars by a score of 115–94.

Sizzlers head coach John Killilea was fired on January 29, 1988 following ejections from three games and a total of 14 technical fouls during the 1987–88 CBA season. John Darr, a Kansas high school basketball coach, was hired as head coach following Killilea's dismissal. Just over a week later Bob Hill replaced Darr as head coach.

Before the 1988–89 season Sizzlers owner Bernard Glannon sold a majority interest to a group of 14 people led by Jim Garrett and his wife Bonnie Garrett. The Garretts owned several McDonald's franchises in the Topeka area. Under the Garretts' ownership the Sizzlers conducted a door-to-door season ticket drive that sold 300 packages, which increased their total season ticket holders to 1,200 persons.

Topeka hired Art Ross as head coach before the 1988–89 season. Ross resigned his position as head coach on December 19, 1988. His record of 2–14 was last in the CBA. The Sizzlers tapped Ron McHenry for interim head coach. Mike Riley was hired as head coach on December 30 replacing McHenry. Before joining Topeka Riley was assistant coach to Charley Rosen of the Rockford Lightning.

Jerry Schemmel, who served as the Sizzlers' radio play-by-play broadcaster since their re-location to Topeka, was hired as deputy commissioner of the CBA in February 1989.

Topeka lost their first 10 regular season games during their 1989–1990 season which prompted Sizzlers general manager Jim Goodman to announce that he would stay in the nosebleed seats of Landon Arena until his team won a game. Goodman spent three days in the arena — including two days where there was no game — until the Sizzlers defeated the Sioux Falls SkyForce on December 9, 1989. If the Sizzlers lost that game, Goodman told The Times Union, he intended to travel with the team to their next game which was against the Omaha Racers and sit in the rafters of Ak-Sar-Ben, the Racers home venue.

Sizzlers guard-forward Duane Ferrell was named the CBA Newcomer of the Year following the 1989–1990 season.

=== Re-location to Yakima (1990) ===
The Tulsa World reported in January 1990 that the Topeka Sizzlers were looking to re-locate to the state of Washington. Another proposal, according to the Tulsa World report, had the Sizzlers merging with another CBA team. Jim Garrett, principal owner of the Sizzlers, told the United Press International (UPI) in February 1990 that he was looking to sell the team to a buyer in Tri-Cities, Washington. Garrett also told the UPI that there was no chance the Sizzlers would play the 1990–91 season in Topeka.

Max Chambers, who was market testing the viability of a CBA franchise in several states, finally concluded that the state of Washington, particularly the central part of the state, would be the best fit. Chambers set up a season ticket drive in the Tri Cities region and Yakima, Washington to determine which city would be the best location for a CBA team. The group Chambers represented, Pro-Max, was assured by the CBA that they would be able to purchase a franchise following the 1989–1990 season and with the collapse of Topeka it would looking more likely the Sizzlers would re-locate to Washington.

It was announced in March 1990 that Yakima, Washington had won out over the Tri-Cities in their season ticket drive. Chambers, who was representing the group who were negotiating the purchase of the Sizzlers, told the Associated Press, "We're moving to Yakima." During the annual CBA owners meeting in May 1990 the sale and re-location of the Sizzlers to Yakima, Washington was approved.

=== Legal dispute (1991–92) ===
Jim & Bonnie Garrett, who purchased majority interest in the Sizzlers in 1988, sued the previous owner Bernie Glannon in 1991 for what they alleged was misrepresentation. The Garretts claimed that Glannon overcharged them by $475,000 (it cost $500,000 for an expansion franchise in the CBA). Glannon disputed the valuation by the Garretts and alleged they failed to pay him the remaining $205,000 for the Sizzlers. The case was originally heard in 1991 at the Shawnee County, Kansas District Court, who sided with Glannon, saying he did not misrepresent the sale of the Sizzlers. Furthermore, the jury ruled that the Garretts had to pay Glannon the remainder owed to him.

The Garretts appealed the case to the Kansas Court of Appeals, who in 1992, sided with the lower court's ruling that Glannon did not misrepresent the Sizzlers before selling interest to the Glannon's.

== Awards ==
- 1987 CBA All-Star Team: Ron Rowan (guard), Calvin Thompson (guard), Joe Binion (forward)
- 1986–87 CBA Most Valuable Player: Joe Binion
- 1986–87 CBA Rookie of the Year: Ron Rowan
- 1988-89 CBA All-League (1st Team): Jim Rowinski
- 1989-90 CBA All-League (1st Team): Jim Rowinski
- 1989–1990 CBA Newcomer of the Year: Duane Ferrell

== Season-by-season records ==
Years	Wins	Losses	Winning percentage	Points	Head coaches
1985–86	25	23	.521	169.0	Bill Ficke
1986–87	24	24	.500	163.5	John Killilea
1987-88	21	33	.389	163.5	John Killilea, John Darr, Bob Hill
1988–89	14	40	.259	125.0	Art Ross, Ron McHenry, Mike Riley
1989–1990	10	46	.179	115.0	Mike Riley

== Head coaches ==
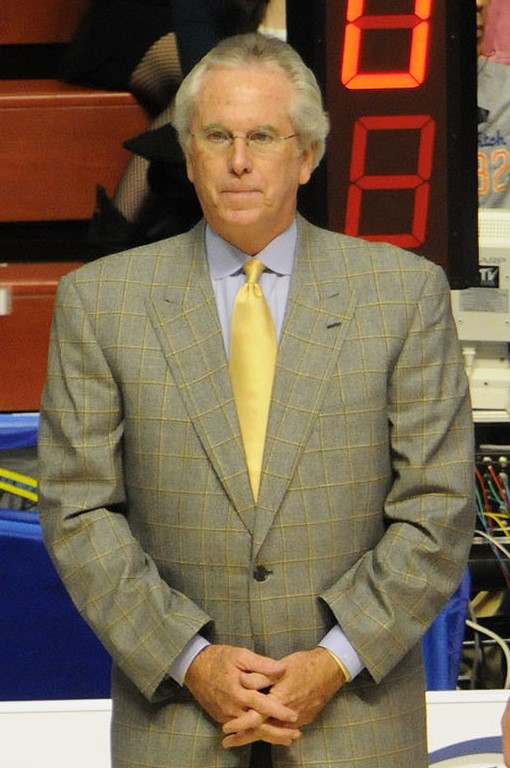
Bob Hill was the third head coach of the Sizzlers during the 1986–87 season.

- Bill Ficke, 1985–86
- John Killilea, 1986–88
- John Darr, 1988
- Bob Hill, 1988
- Art Ross, 1988
- Ron McHenry, 1988
- Mike Riley, 1988–1990

== See also ==
- Kansas City Steers, professional basketball team in Kansas City from 1961 to 1963
- Sacramento Kings, re-located from Kansas City to Sacramento in 1985
- List of past and present Kansas City sports teams
