= DeSean Hadley =

American basketball player (born 1977)

Personal information
- Born: September 14, 1977 (age 49)
- Listed height: 6 ft 3 in (1.91 m)
- Listed weight: 190 lb (86 kg)

Career information
- High school: Patterson (Dayton, Ohio)
- College: Sinclair CC (1996–1998); Eastern Michigan (1998–2000)
- NBA draft: 2000: undrafted
- Playing career: 2001–2011
- Position: Guard
- Coaching career: 2010–2013

Career history

Playing
- 2001–2003: Flint Fuze / Great Lakes Storm
- 2003: Hickory Nutz
- 2003–2004: Idaho Stampede
- 2004: Aurora Jesi
- 2004: Cedar Rapids River Raiders
- 2004–2005: Sioux Falls Skyforce
- 2005: Río Breogán
- 2005–2006: Galatasaray
- 2006–2007: Dodge City Legend
- 2006–2007: Sioux Falls Skyforce
- 2007; 2010–2011: Idaho Stampede

Coaching
- 2010–2012: Idaho Stampede (assistant)
- 2012–2013: Sioux Falls Skyforce (assistant)

Career highlights
- CBA champion (2005); 2× CBA All-Star (2004, 2005); 2× All-CBA Second Team (2004, 2005); CBA Defensive Player of the Year (2004); 2× CBA All-Defensive team (2004, 2005); CBA All-Rookie team (2002); NJCAA Division II Player of the Year (1998)

DeSean William Hadley (born September 14, 1977) is an American former professional basketball player and coach. He played college basketball for the Eastern Michigan Eagles. Hadley played primarily in the Continental Basketball Association (CBA) and NBA Development League. He won a CBA championship with the Sioux Falls Skyforce in 2005. Hadley was a two-time CBA All-Star and chosen as the CBA Defensive Player of the Year in 2004. He also played overseas in Italy, Spain, Turkey, Saudi Arabia, Cyprus and South Korea.

== Early life ==
Hadley was raised by his mother Daphne Ellis in Dayton, Ohio, alongside his two younger sisters. His father was never part of his family. Ellis married in 1995 and moved to Wisconsin but Hadley and one of his sisters decided to stay at their home in Dayton. Hadley worked as a recreation leader at Westwood Community Center to support himself.

Hadley attended Patterson Cooperative High School in Dayton. He tried to make the basketball team as a freshman and sophomore but was cut both times. Hadley started playing in a recreation league with older players to improve himself and also grew from 5 ft 8 in (1.73 m) to 6 ft 0 in (1.83 m) by the time he was a junior. He made the Patterson team for his junior season and entered the starting line-up in his second game where he stayed for the rest of his high school career. Hadley was overshadowed by other players on the team and received no scholarship offers. He agreed to attend the University of Akron and try to make the Zips basketball team as a walk-on.

== College career ==
Hadley spent one season at the University of Akron but realised that he was not able to afford being there. Despite receiving loans and grants alongside help from his family, Hadley moved back to Dayton after one semester.

Hadley enrolled at Sinclair Community College in 1996 where he did not know there was a basketball team until he was given an opportunity to play by head coach Don Cundiff. He spent his freshman season learning from upperclassmen and honing his play style. Cundiff retired after the 1996–97 season and new head coach Paul Bryant gave Hadley leadership of the team. Hadley played at all five positions for Sinclair and opened every game jumping center for tip-off. He was assigned to guard the team's toughest player on defense. Bryant called Hadley "our Michael Jordan, our Scottie Pippen, he's my everything." Hadley led the team in scoring with 17.4 points per game and was second in rebounding (8.5), assists (5.4) and steals (2.2). Sinclair achieved a 29–5 record and finished second in the national tournament in 1998. Hadley was chosen as the National Junior College Athletic Association Division II Player of the Year. He was also the first Sinclair athlete named as a first-team NJCAA Division II All-American in any sport.

Hadley received a full scholarship to play for the Eastern Michigan Eagles in 1998. He was selected for the team's Senior Award in 2000.

Hadley was inducted in the Sinclair Athletics Hall of Fame in 2018.

== Professional career ==
Hadley began his professional career in 2001 with the Flint Fuze of the Continental Basketball Association (CBA). He averaged 9.0 points and 5.1 rebounds per game and was selected to the CBA All-Rookie team. On October 30, 2002, Hadley re-signed with the Fuze as they became the Great Lakes Storm. Hadley played for the Hickory Nutz of the Carolinas Basketball League in 2003.

Hadley joined the Idaho Stampede of the CBA for the 2003–04 season. He was selected to the 2004 CBA All-Star Game. Hadley averaged 17.7 points and 6.1 rebounds per game with the Stampede. He was chosen as the CBA Defensive Player of the Year and named to the All-CBA Second Team and All-Defensive team. Hadley joined the Aurora Basket Jesi in Italy for the end of the 2003–04 season. On June 8, 2004, he signed with the Cedar Rapids River Raiders of the United States Basketball League.

On November 10, 2004, Hadley signed with the Sioux Falls Skyforce of the CBA. He averaged 16.9 points and 5.9 rebounds per game. Hadley was selected to play in the 2005 CBA All-Star Game. He was named to the All-CBA Second Team and All-Defensive team. The Skyforce won the 2005 CBA championship.

Hadley played for the New Orleans Hornets at the 2005 NBA Summer League. He played for Galatasaray in Turkey during the 2005–06 season and averaged 6.9 points per game.

Hadley was selected by the Skyforce in the second round of the 2006 NBA Development League draft. On January 11, 2007, he was waived by the Skyforce. On February 1, Hadley was re-signed by the Skyforce. On February 13, Hadley was waived by the Skyforce. On March 16, he was signed by the Stampede of the NBA Development League.

Hadley played in Saudi Arabia during the 2009–10 season where he led the league in scoring with an average of more than 36 points per game. He returned to the Stampede for the 2010–11 season where he played under his former teammate Randy Livingston as head coach.

Hadley also played in Spain, Cyprus and South Korea.

== Coaching career ==
Hadley spent two seasons as an assistant coach for the Idaho Stampede of the NBA Development League from 2010 to 2012. He was appointed as an assistant coach for the Sioux Falls Skyforce of the NBA Development League during the 2012–13 season.

== Personal life ==
Hadley lives in Atlanta where he runs small businesses. He has two daughters.
