= 2005 CBA All-Star Game =

2005 CBA organised All-Star Game

| Western Conference | Eastern Conference |
|---|---|
| 110 | 114 |
- Date: January 19, 2005
- Venue: Genesis Convention Center, Gary
- MVP: Sam Clancy Jr.
- Attendance: 6,683

The 2005 Continental Basketball Association All-Star Game was the 39th All-Star Game organised by CBA since its inception in 1949. It was held at the Genesis Convention Center in Gary, Indiana in front of 6,683 spectators, on January 19, 2005. The Eastern Conference defeated the Western Conference 107–105.

Sam Clancy Jr. was named the MVP.

== The 2005 CBA All-Star Game events ==
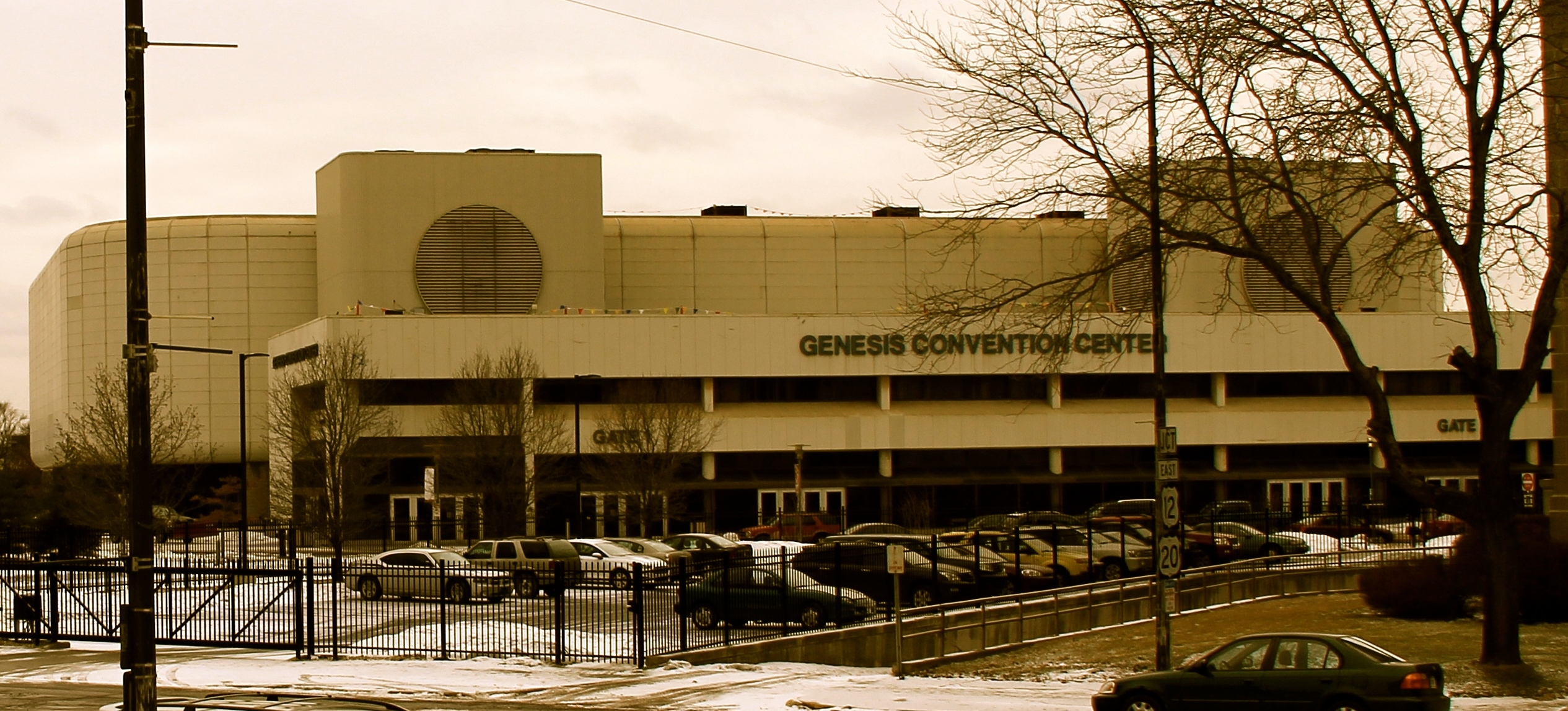
The Genesis Convention Center.

=== CBA Long Distance Shootout ===
David Graves of Gary Steelheads was the winner.

=== Slum-dunk ===
Renaldo Major of Gary Steelheads was the winner.

=== The Game ===
Sam Clancy Jr. of Idaho Stampede was the top scorer of the match with 19 pts for the Western. Randy Livingston had 19, Alpha Bangura scored 12 and DeSean Hadley 15.

== All-Star teams ==
=== Rosters ===
Eastern Conference
| Pos. | Number | Player | Team | Previous appearances |
Team
| G | #32 | (United States) Stais Boseman | Rockford Lightning | |
| F | #45 | (United States) Jackie Butler | Great Lakes Storm | |
| C | #50 | (United States) Shelly Clark | Gary Steelheads | |
| F | #41 | (United States) Charles Gaines | Michigan Mayhem | |
| F | #12 | (United States) David Graves | Gary Steelheads | |
| C | #45 | (United States) Lonnie Jones | Gary Steelheads | |
| G | #6 | (United States) Mark Jones | Great Lakes Storm | |
| F | #25 | (United States) Marshall Phillips | Rockford Lightning | |
| F | #11 | (United States) Kasib Powell | Great Lakes Storm | |
| G | #10 | (United States) Jemeil Rich | Gary Steelheads | 2004 |
Head coach: (United States) Chris Daleo (Rockford Lightning)

Western Conference
| Pos. | Number | Player | Team | Previous appearances |
Team
| F | #15 | (Libya) (Sierra Leone) Alpha Bangura | Sioux Falls Skyforce | |
| G | #5 | (United States) Sam Clancy Jr. | Idaho Stampede | |
| F | #35 | (United States) Carlos Daniel | Yakima Sun Kings | |
| G | #7 | (United States) DeSean Hadley | Sioux Falls Skyforce | |
| F | #1 | (United States) Britton Johnsen | Idaho Stampede | |
| G | #32 | (United States) Randy Livingston | Sioux Falls Skyforce | 2001 |
| G | #13 | (United States) Marlon Parmer | Yakima Sun Kings | |
| C | #40 | (United States) Chad Prewitt | Dakota Wizards | |
| G | #21 | (United States) Melvin Sanders | Dakota Wizards | |
| G | #12 | (United States) Billy Thomas | Dakota Wizards | |
Unavailable
| F | | (United States) John Thomas | Sioux Falls Skyforce | |
Head coach: (United States) Casey Owens (Dakota Wizards)

- John Thomas was called up to NBA.

=== Result ===
| Team 1 | Score | Team 2 |
|---|---|---|
| Eastern Conference | 114- 110 | Western Conference |

== Awards ==
| MVP | Topscorer | Slam-dunk champion | Long Distance Shootout Winner |
|---|---|---|---|
| (United States) Sam Clancy Jr. | (United States) Sam Clancy Jr. | (United States) Renaldo Major | (United States) David Graves |

== See also ==
- 2004 CBA All-Star Game
- Continental Basketball Association

== Sources ==
- HISTORY OF THE CBA ALL STAR GAME
- 2005 CBA All*Star Game
