= Derrick Atterberry =

American football player (born 1972)

No. 8, 23
- Position: Defensive back

Personal information
- Born: November 1, 1972 (age 54); Dayton, Ohio, U.S.
- Listed height: 6 ft 0 in (1.83 m)
- Listed weight: 190 lb (86 kg)

Career information
- High school: John H. Patterson (Dayton)
- College: Vanderbilt (1991–1994)
- NFL draft: 1995: undrafted

Career history
- Memphis Mad Dogs (1995); Indianapolis Colts (1996)*; Miami Dolphins (1997)*; → Amsterdam Admirals (1997)*; Nashville Kats (1997); Tampa Bay Storm (1999)
- * Offseason or practice squad member only
- Stats at ArenaFan.com

Derrick D. Atterberry (born November 1, 1972) is an American former football defensive back. He played college football at Vanderbilt University, and professionally for the Memphis Mad Dogs of the Canadian Football League (CFL) and the Nashville Kats of the Arena Football League (AFL). He was also a member of the Indianapolis Colts and Miami Dolphins of the National Football League (NFL).

== Early life and college ==
Derrick D. Atterberry was born on November 1, 1972, in Dayton, Ohio. He attended John H. Patterson Career Center in Dayton for high school and graduated in 1991. He earned Dayton Daily News All-Area honors while in high school.

Atterberry was a member of the Vanderbilt Commodores of Vanderbilt University from 1991 to 1994. He was redshirted in 1991. He was a two-year letterman from 1993 to 1994. Atterberry started one game at cornerback in 1994. In March 1995, it was reported that Atterberry was quitting the team and skipping his senior season. Nevertheless, he still graduated from Vanderbilt in 1995.

== Professional career ==
Atterberry signed with the Memphis Mad Dogs of the Canadian Football League on April 12, 1995. He dressed in six games for the Mad Dogs during the 1995 season, posting two defensive tackles and two special teams tackles.

On March 19, 1996, Atterberry signed a two-year contract with the Indianapolis Colts of the National Football League (NFL). Atterberry's agent, Ron Todd, stated that Atterberry would earn the league minimum of $131,000 his first year and $164,000 his second year. He was waived by the Colts on July 21, 1996.

Atterberry had a tryout with the NFL's Miami Dolphins on February 13, 1997. He then signed a two-year deal with the Dolphins. On February 20, 1997, it was reported that the Dolphins had allocated him to NFL Europe to play for the Amsterdam Admirals. However, he never played for the Admirals. Atterberry was released by the Dolphins in April 1997.

Atterberry then played in four games for the Nashville Kats of the Arena Football League (AFL) as a defensive specialist during the 1997 season, recording 12 solo tackles, one forced fumble, and one pass breakup. He re-signed with the Kats on January 21, 1998. Atterberry was waived on April 13, 1998, a few weeks before the start of the 1998 season.

Atterberry signed with the Tampa Bay Storm of the AFL for the 1999 season. He began the season on injured reserve and never played for the Storm.

== Post-playing career ==
Atterberry was the defensive backs coach for the Alabama State Hornets in 2000. He left the team after the season to join the CIAA office. He later became an assistant football coach at Springfield High School in Springfield, Ohio.
