= 2004 CBA All-Star Game =

2004 CBA organised All-Star Game

American Conference	National Conference
103	105
- Venue: Yakima SunDome, Yakima
- MVP: Roberto Bergersen

The 2004 Continental Basketball Association All-Star Game was the 38th All-Star Game organised by CBA since its inception in 1949. It was held at the Yakima SunDome of a 6,000 capacity in Yakima, Washington. The National Conference defeated the American Conference 107–105.

Roberto Bergersen was named the MVP.

Roy Tarpley was probably the biggest name in this edition, having played previously 6 seasons in the NBA.

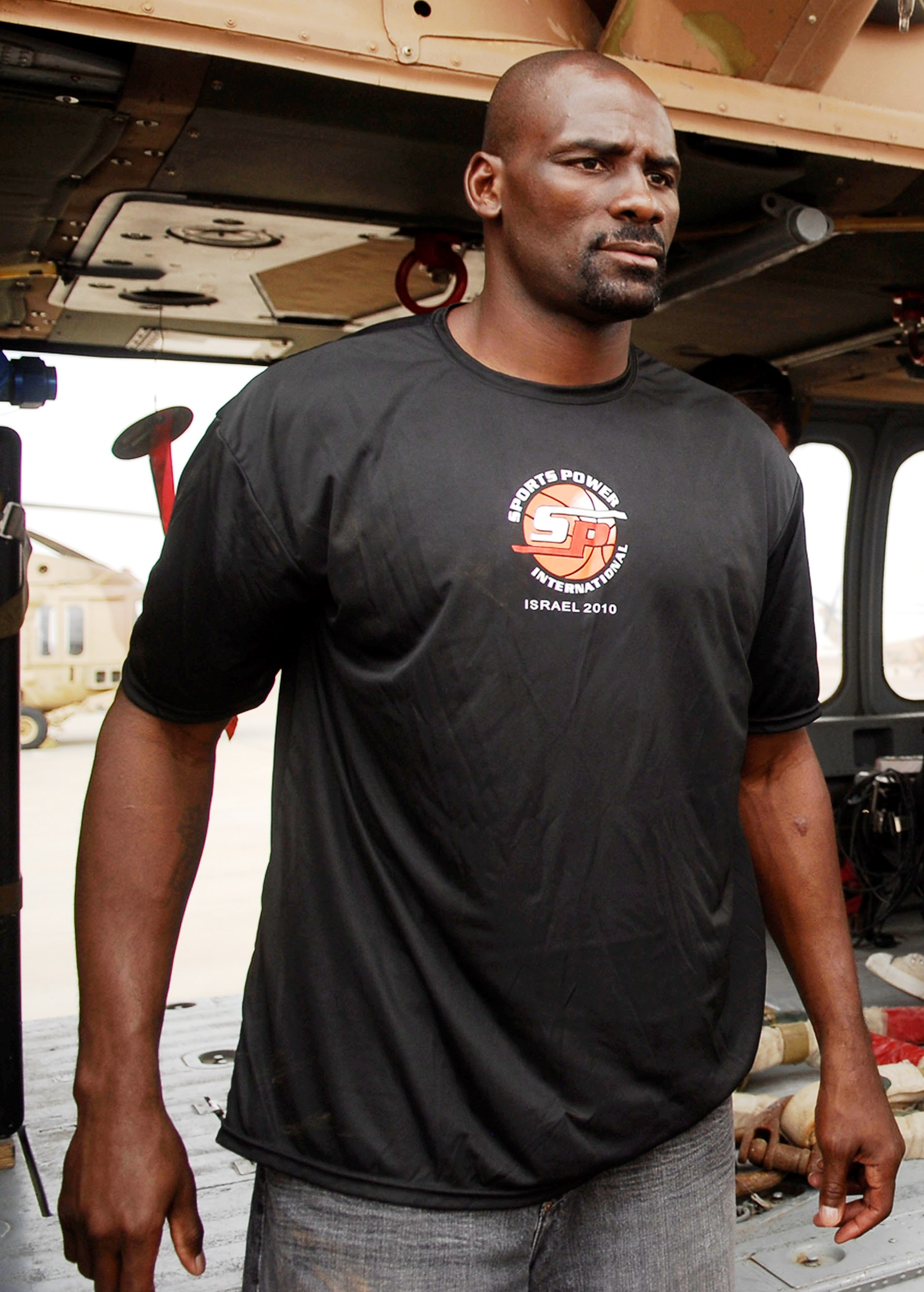
Anthony Bonner was selected for the All-Star Game

== The 2004 CBA All-Star Game events ==
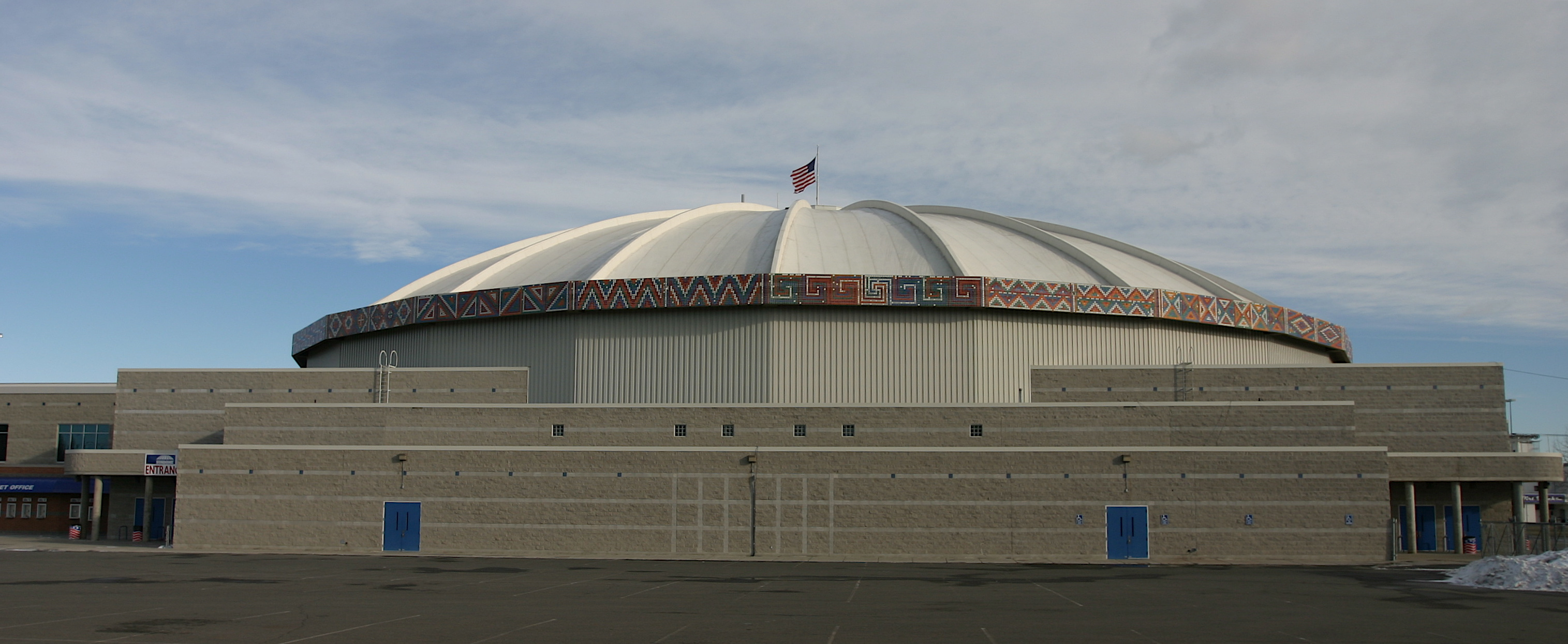
The Yakima Sundome venue.

=== CBA Long Distance Shootout ===
Jimmie Hunter of Rockford Lightning was the winner.

=== Slum-dunk ===
Kaniel Dickens of Dakota Wizards was the winner.

=== The Game ===
Roberto Bergersen was the top scorer of the match with 27 pts for the American Conference, while teammates Leonard White scored 16 and David Jackson had 12.

== All-Star teams ==
=== Rosters ===
National Conference
Pos.	Number	Player	Team	Previous appearances
Team
F	#40	(United States) Anthony Bonner	Great Lakes Storm	
G	#42	(United States) Torraye Braggs	Yakima Sun Kings	2000
F	#33	(United States) Kaniel Dickens	Dakota Wizards	
C	#41	(United States) Ben Ebong	Dakota Wizards	
G	#25	(United States) Ronnie Fields	Rockford Lightning	2003
G	#4	(United States) Eddie Gill	Dakota Wizards	
G	#6	(United States) Anthony Goldwire*	Yakima Sun Kings	
G	#1	(United States) Jimmie Hunter	Rockford Lightning	
G	#45	(United States) Anthony Miller	Yakima Sun Kings	
G	#24	(United States) Ray Weathers	Dakota Wizards	
Head coach: (United States) Dave Joerger (Dakota Wizards)

American Conference
Pos.	Number	Player	Team	Previous appearances
Team
G	#20	(United States) Roberto Bergersen	Idaho Stampede	
F	#5	(United States) Josh Davis	Idaho Stampede	
G	#22	(United States) DeSean Hadley	Idaho Stampede	
G	#22	(United States) David Lee Jackson	Sioux Falls Skyforce	
C	#23	(United States) Immanuel McElroy	Gary Steelheads	
F	#10	(United States) Jemeil Rich	Gary Steelheads	
C	#42	(United States) Leon Smith *	Gary Steelheads	
C	#55	(United States) Roy Tarpley	Sioux Falls Skyforce	
F	#33	(United States) Leonard White	Sioux Falls Skyforce	1996
F	#33	(United States) Galen Young	Gary Steelheads	
Head coach: (United States) Larry Krystkowiak (Idaho Stampede)

- Selected but they were unavailable.

=== Result ===
Team 1	Score	Team 2
National Conference	105 - 103	American Conference

== Awards ==
MVP	Topscorer	Slam-dunk champion	Long Distance Shootout Winner
(United States) Roberto Bergersen	(United States) Roberto Bergersen	(United States) Kaniel Dickens	(United States) Jimmie Hunter

== See also ==
- 2003 CBA All-Star Game
- Continental Basketball Association
