= 2016–17 NBA season =

71st NBA season

- League: National Basketball Association
- Sport: Basketball
- Duration: October 25, 2016 – April 12, 2017; April 15 – May 25, 2017 (Playoffs); June 1–12, 2017 (Finals)
- Games: 82
- Teams: 30
- TV partner(s): ABC, TNT, ESPN, NBA TV

Draft
- Top draft pick: Ben Simmons
- Picked by: Philadelphia 76ers

Regular season
- Top seed: Golden State Warriors
- Season MVP: Russell Westbrook (Oklahoma City)
- Top scorer: Russell Westbrook (Oklahoma City)

Playoffs
- Eastern champions: Cleveland Cavaliers
- Eastern runners-up: Boston Celtics
- Western champions: Golden State Warriors
- Western runners-up: San Antonio Spurs

Finals
- Champions: Golden State Warriors
- Runners-up: Cleveland Cavaliers
- Finals MVP: Kevin Durant (Golden State)

NBA seasons
- ← 2015–16 2017–18 →

The 2016–17 NBA season was the 71st season of the National Basketball Association. The regular season began on October 25, 2016, with the 2016 NBA champion Cleveland Cavaliers hosting a game against the New York Knicks. The 2017 NBA All-Star Game was played at the Smoothie King Center in New Orleans, Louisiana, on February 19, 2017, with the West defeating the East 192–182. Anthony Davis of the New Orleans Pelicans was named the All Star Game MVP after breaking Wilt Chamberlain's record by scoring 52 points in the All Star Game. The original host of the game, Charlotte's Spectrum Center, was removed as the host on July 21, 2016, due to the league's opposition against North Carolina's Public Facilities Privacy & Security Act. The regular season ended on April 12, 2017, and the playoffs began on April 15, 2017, and ended on June 12, 2017, with the Golden State Warriors going 16–1 in the playoffs and beating the Cleveland Cavaliers in five games during their third consecutive matchup in the NBA Finals. This was the last season for the NBA to use Adidas jerseys. Starting with the 2017–18 NBA season, the jerseys were from Nike. Additionally, Kevin Durant signed with the Golden State Warriors, and Dwyane Wade with the Chicago Bulls, after playing their entire careers until then with one team (Seattle SuperSonics/Oklahoma City Thunder and Miami Heat, respectively).

== Transactions ==
=== Retirement ===
- On July 11, 2016, Tim Duncan officially announced his retirement after playing 19 seasons, winning five NBA championships with the San Antonio Spurs.
- On July 12, 2016, Wang Zhizhi officially announced his retirement from professional basketball. Zhizhi played for three NBA teams during his 20-year playing career.
- On July 25, 2016, Sasha Kaun officially announced his retirement after playing only one season in the NBA, winning one NBA championship with the Cleveland Cavaliers.
- On July 26, 2016, Amar'e Stoudemire officially announced his retirement from the NBA after signing a ceremonial contract with the New York Knicks so he could officially end his 14-season career as an NBA player, and went to play in Israel.
- On September 23, 2016, Kevin Garnett officially announced his retirement after playing 21 seasons, winning one NBA championship with the Boston Celtics. Garnett was the last remaining active player from the 1995 NBA draft.
- On September 26, 2016, Paul Pierce officially announced that the 2016–17 season would be his last after playing 19 seasons, winning one NBA championship with the Boston Celtics.
- On September 26, 2016, Mo Williams officially announced his retirement after playing 13 seasons, winning one NBA championship with the Cleveland Cavaliers.
- On October 20, 2016, Elton Brand officially announced his retirement after playing 17 seasons.
- On November 1, 2016, Ray Allen officially announced his retirement after playing 18 seasons, winning two NBA championships with the Boston Celtics and the Miami Heat. Prior to announcing his retirement, Allen had not played since the end of the 2013–14 season. Allen was the last remaining active player from the 1996 NBA draft.
- On November 25, 2016, Kevin Martin announced his retirement from the NBA after playing 12 seasons.
- On December 6, 2016, Steve Blake announced his retirement from the NBA after playing 13 seasons in the NBA, and one season in the NBL in Australia.
- On December 19, 2016, DeShawn Stevenson announced his retirement from the NBA after playing 13 seasons, winning one NBA championship with the Dallas Mavericks.
- On January 6, 2017, Matt Bonner officially announced his retirement after playing 12 seasons, winning two NBA championships with the San Antonio Spurs.

=== Free agency ===
Free agency negotiations began on July 1, 2016, at 12:01 a.m. e.t. Players were allowed to sign starting on July 6, after the July moratorium ended.

=== Coaching changes ===
Coaching changes
Off-season
| Team | 2015–16 season | 2016–17 season |
|---|---|---|
| Brooklyn Nets | Tony Brown (interim) | Kenny Atkinson |
| Minnesota Timberwolves | Sam Mitchell (interim) | Tom Thibodeau |
| Washington Wizards | Randy Wittman | Scott Brooks |
| Los Angeles Lakers | Byron Scott | Luke Walton |
| Sacramento Kings | George Karl | Dave Joerger |
| Indiana Pacers | Frank Vogel | Nate McMillan |
| Orlando Magic | Scott Skiles | Frank Vogel |
| Memphis Grizzlies | Dave Joerger | David Fizdale |
| Houston Rockets | J. B. Bickerstaff (interim) | Mike D'Antoni |
| New York Knicks | Kurt Rambis (interim) | Jeff Hornacek |

==== Off-season ====
- On April 14, 2016, Sam Mitchell was relieved of his interim head coaching duties as the coach of the Minnesota Timberwolves after the last game of the season, allowing them to look for a permanent coach.
- On April 14, 2016, the Washington Wizards fired Randy Wittman after the team missed the playoffs.
- On April 14, 2016, George Karl was fired by the Sacramento Kings after a disappointing 2015–16 season in which the Kings went 33–49.
- On April 17, 2016, it was announced that Kenny Atkinson would be coaching with the Brooklyn Nets.
- On April 19, 2016, Earl Watson would remove the interim coach tag he had last season and would be the coach of the Phoenix Suns for the next three years.
- On April 20, 2016, the Timberwolves agreed to sign Tom Thibodeau to be their head coach and president of basketball operations. He was previously an assistant coach for the team from 1989 to 1991.
- On April 25, 2016, the Lakers did not exercise their option on Scott's contract for the following season, deciding to pursue a new coach. His 38–126 (.232) record with the team was the worst of any of the 16 coaches who had led the franchise for at least two seasons.
- On April 26, 2016, the Washington Wizards hired Scott Brooks to be their head coach.
- On April 29, 2016, the Los Angeles Lakers hired Warriors Coach Luke Walton to become their new head coach. Walton led the Warriors to a 24–0 start in the 2015–16 season when Steve Kerr was sidelined.
- On May 5, 2016, despite making the playoffs, Pacers' president Larry Bird announced that Frank Vogel's contract would not be renewed, citing a need for a new voice to lead the players.
- On May 7, 2016, the Memphis Grizzlies fired Dave Joerger after the team was swept in the first round.
- On May 9, 2016, the Sacramento Kings hired Dave Joerger to become their new head coach, just two days after he was fired by the Memphis Grizzlies.
- On May 12, 2016, Scott Skiles resigned as head coach of the Orlando Magic after only one season with the team.
- On May 16, 2016, the Indiana Pacers named their assistant head coach Nate McMillan to become their new head coach.
- On May 20, 2016, the Orlando Magic announced that they signed Frank Vogel to become their head coach.
- On May 29, 2016, David Fizdale, former Miami Heat assistant coach, was named as the Memphis Grizzlies head coach.
- On June 1, 2016, the Houston Rockets named Mike D'Antoni as their new head coach.
- On June 2, 2016, the New York Knicks announced Jeff Hornacek as their new head coach.

==== In-season ====
There were no head coaching changes during the regular season. This was the first time since the 1963–64 NBA season that there was no in-season coaching changes, the fourth time this happened in league history.

== Preseason ==
The preseason began on October 1, 2016, and ended on October 21, 2016.

== Regular season ==
The regular season began on October 25, 2016. Christmas Day games were played on December 25, 2016. The regular season ended on April 12, 2017. The schedule was released at 6:00 p.m. ET on August 11, 2016.

Eastern Conference

| Atlantic Division | W | L | PCT | GB | Home | Road | Div | GP |
|---|---|---|---|---|---|---|---|---|
| c – Boston Celtics | 53 | 29 | .646 | – | 30‍–‍11 | 23‍–‍18 | 11–5 | 82 |
| x – Toronto Raptors | 51 | 31 | .622 | 2.0 | 28‍–‍13 | 23‍–‍18 | 14–2 | 82 |
| New York Knicks | 31 | 51 | .378 | 22.0 | 19‍–‍22 | 12‍–‍29 | 5–11 | 82 |
| Philadelphia 76ers | 28 | 54 | .341 | 25.0 | 17‍–‍24 | 11‍–‍30 | 7–9 | 82 |
| Brooklyn Nets | 20 | 62 | .244 | 33.0 | 13‍–‍28 | 7‍–‍34 | 3–13 | 82 |

| Central Division | W | L | PCT | GB | Home | Road | Div | GP |
|---|---|---|---|---|---|---|---|---|
| y – Cleveland Cavaliers | 51 | 31 | .622 | – | 31‍–‍10 | 20‍–‍21 | 8–8 | 82 |
| x – Milwaukee Bucks | 42 | 40 | .512 | 9.0 | 23‍–‍18 | 19‍–‍22 | 10–6 | 82 |
| x – Indiana Pacers | 42 | 40 | .512 | 9.0 | 29‍–‍12 | 13‍–‍28 | 8–8 | 82 |
| x – Chicago Bulls | 41 | 41 | .500 | 10.0 | 25‍–‍16 | 16‍–‍25 | 9–7 | 82 |
| Detroit Pistons | 37 | 45 | .451 | 14.0 | 24‍–‍17 | 13‍–‍28 | 5–11 | 82 |

| Southeast Division | W | L | PCT | GB | Home | Road | Div | GP |
|---|---|---|---|---|---|---|---|---|
| y – Washington Wizards | 49 | 33 | .598 | – | 30‍–‍11 | 19‍–‍22 | 8–8 | 82 |
| x – Atlanta Hawks | 43 | 39 | .524 | 6.0 | 23‍–‍18 | 20‍–‍21 | 6–10 | 82 |
| Miami Heat | 41 | 41 | .500 | 8.0 | 23‍–‍18 | 18‍–‍23 | 9–7 | 82 |
| Charlotte Hornets | 36 | 46 | .439 | 13.0 | 22‍–‍19 | 14‍–‍27 | 10–6 | 82 |
| Orlando Magic | 29 | 53 | .354 | 20.0 | 16‍–‍25 | 13‍–‍28 | 7–9 | 82 |

Western Conference

| Northwest Division | W | L | PCT | GB | Home | Road | Div | GP |
|---|---|---|---|---|---|---|---|---|
| y – Utah Jazz | 51 | 31 | .622 | – | 29‍–‍12 | 22‍–‍19 | 8–8 | 82 |
| x – Oklahoma City Thunder | 47 | 35 | .573 | 4.0 | 28‍–‍13 | 19‍–‍22 | 10–6 | 82 |
| x – Portland Trail Blazers | 41 | 41 | .500 | 10.0 | 25‍–‍16 | 16‍–‍25 | 11–5 | 82 |
| e – Denver Nuggets | 40 | 42 | .488 | 11.0 | 22‍–‍19 | 18‍–‍23 | 6–10 | 82 |
| e – Minnesota Timberwolves | 31 | 51 | .378 | 20.0 | 20‍–‍21 | 11‍–‍30 | 5–11 | 82 |

| Pacific Division | W | L | PCT | GB | Home | Road | Div | GP |
|---|---|---|---|---|---|---|---|---|
| z – Golden State Warriors | 67 | 15 | .817 | – | 36‍–‍5 | 31‍–‍10 | 14–2 | 82 |
| x – Los Angeles Clippers | 51 | 31 | .622 | 16.0 | 29‍–‍12 | 22‍–‍19 | 10–6 | 82 |
| e – Sacramento Kings | 32 | 50 | .390 | 35.0 | 17‍–‍24 | 15‍–‍26 | 7–9 | 82 |
| e – Los Angeles Lakers | 26 | 56 | .317 | 41.0 | 17‍–‍24 | 9‍–‍32 | 6–10 | 82 |
| e – Phoenix Suns | 24 | 58 | .293 | 43.0 | 15‍–‍26 | 9‍–‍32 | 3–13 | 82 |

| Southwest Division | W | L | PCT | GB | Home | Road | Div | GP |
|---|---|---|---|---|---|---|---|---|
| y – San Antonio Spurs | 61 | 21 | .744 | – | 31‍–‍10 | 30‍–‍11 | 11–5 | 82 |
| x – Houston Rockets | 55 | 27 | .671 | 6.0 | 30‍–‍11 | 25‍–‍16 | 10–6 | 82 |
| x – Memphis Grizzlies | 43 | 39 | .524 | 18.0 | 24‍–‍17 | 19‍–‍22 | 8–8 | 82 |
| e – New Orleans Pelicans | 34 | 48 | .415 | 27.0 | 21‍–‍20 | 13‍–‍28 | 6–10 | 82 |
| e – Dallas Mavericks | 33 | 49 | .402 | 28.0 | 21‍–‍20 | 12‍–‍29 | 5–11 | 82 |

=== By conference ===
Eastern Conference
| # | Team | W | L | PCT | GB | GP |
|---|---|---|---|---|---|---|
| 1 | c – Boston Celtics * | 53 | 29 | .646 | – | 82 |
| 2 | y – Cleveland Cavaliers * | 51 | 31 | .622 | 2.0 | 82 |
| 3 | x – Toronto Raptors | 51 | 31 | .622 | 2.0 | 82 |
| 4 | y – Washington Wizards * | 49 | 33 | .598 | 4.0 | 82 |
| 5 | x – Atlanta Hawks | 43 | 39 | .524 | 10.0 | 82 |
| 6 | x – Milwaukee Bucks | 42 | 40 | .512 | 11.0 | 82 |
| 7 | x – Indiana Pacers | 42 | 40 | .512 | 11.0 | 82 |
| 8 | x – Chicago Bulls | 41 | 41 | .500 | 12.0 | 82 |
| 9 | Miami Heat | 41 | 41 | .500 | 12.0 | 82 |
| 10 | Detroit Pistons | 37 | 45 | .451 | 16.0 | 82 |
| 11 | Charlotte Hornets | 36 | 46 | .439 | 17.0 | 82 |
| 12 | New York Knicks | 31 | 51 | .378 | 22.0 | 82 |
| 13 | Orlando Magic | 29 | 53 | .354 | 24.0 | 82 |
| 14 | Philadelphia 76ers | 28 | 54 | .341 | 25.0 | 82 |
| 15 | Brooklyn Nets | 20 | 62 | .244 | 33.0 | 82 |

Western Conference
| # | Team | W | L | PCT | GB | GP |
|---|---|---|---|---|---|---|
| 1 | z – Golden State Warriors * | 67 | 15 | .817 | – | 82 |
| 2 | y – San Antonio Spurs * | 61 | 21 | .744 | 6.0 | 82 |
| 3 | x – Houston Rockets | 55 | 27 | .671 | 12.0 | 82 |
| 4 | x – Los Angeles Clippers | 51 | 31 | .622 | 16.0 | 82 |
| 5 | y – Utah Jazz * | 51 | 31 | .622 | 16.0 | 82 |
| 6 | x – Oklahoma City Thunder | 47 | 35 | .573 | 20.0 | 82 |
| 7 | x – Memphis Grizzlies | 43 | 39 | .524 | 24.0 | 82 |
| 8 | x – Portland Trail Blazers | 41 | 41 | .500 | 26.0 | 82 |
| 9 | e – Denver Nuggets | 40 | 42 | .488 | 27.0 | 82 |
| 10 | e – New Orleans Pelicans | 34 | 48 | .415 | 33.0 | 82 |
| 11 | e – Dallas Mavericks | 33 | 49 | .402 | 34.0 | 82 |
| 12 | e – Sacramento Kings | 32 | 50 | .390 | 35.0 | 82 |
| 13 | e – Minnesota Timberwolves | 31 | 51 | .378 | 36.0 | 82 |
| 14 | e – Los Angeles Lakers | 26 | 56 | .317 | 41.0 | 82 |
| 15 | e – Phoenix Suns | 24 | 58 | .293 | 43.0 | 82 |

Notes

- z – Clinched home court advantage for the entire playoffs
- c – Clinched home court advantage for the conference playoffs
- y – Clinched division title
- x – Clinched playoff spot
- * – Division leader
- e – Eliminated from playoff contention

==== Tiebreakers ====
Eastern Conference

- Cleveland clinched #2 seed over Toronto based on head-to-head record (3–1).
- Milwaukee clinched #6 seed over Indiana based on head-to-head record (3–1).
- Chicago clinched #8 seed over Miami based on head-to-head record (2–1).

Western Conference

- LA Clippers clinched #4 seed over Utah based on head-to-head record (3–1)

== Playoffs ==
The 2017 NBA Playoffs began on April 15, 2017. In May 2017, ESPN aired the Western Conference Finals and TNT aired the Eastern Conference Finals. The season ended with the 2017 NBA Finals which began on June 1, 2017, and ended on June 12, 2017, on ABC.

=== Bracket ===
First Round | Conference Semifinals
E1 | Boston* | 4
E8 | Chicago | 2
E1 | Boston* | 4
E4 | Washington* | 3
E4 | Washington* | 4
E5 | Atlanta | 2
Eastern Conference
E3 | Toronto | 4
E6 | Milwaukee | 2
E3 | Toronto | 0
E2 | Cleveland* | 4
E2 | Cleveland* | 4
E7 | Indiana | 0
W1 | Golden State* | 4
W8 | Portland | 0
W1 | Golden State* | 4
W5 | Utah* | 0
W4 | LA Clippers | 3
W5 | Utah* | 4
Western Conference
W3 | Houston | 4
W6 | Oklahoma City | 1
W3 | Houston | 2
W2 | San Antonio* | 4
W2 | San Antonio* | 4
W7 | Memphis | 2

Conference Finals
E1 | Boston* | 1
E2 | Cleveland* | 4
W1 | Golden State* | 4
W2 | San Antonio* | 0

NBA Finals
E2 | Cleveland* | 1
W1 | Golden State* | 4

- * Division winner
- Bold Series winner
- Italic Team with home-court advantage

== Statistics ==
=== Individual statistic leaders ===
| Category | Player | Team | Statistic |
|---|---|---|---|
| Points per game | Russell Westbrook | Oklahoma City Thunder | 31.6 |
| Rebounds per game | Hassan Whiteside | Miami Heat | 14.1 |
| Assists per game | James Harden | Houston Rockets | 11.2 |
| Steals per game | Draymond Green | Golden State Warriors | 2.03 |
| Blocks per game | Rudy Gobert | Utah Jazz | 2.64 |
| Turnovers per game | James Harden | Houston Rockets | 5.7 |
| Fouls per game | DeMarcus Cousins | Sacramento Kings/New Orleans Pelicans | 3.9 |
| Minutes per game | LeBron James | Cleveland Cavaliers | 37.8 |
| FG% | DeAndre Jordan | Los Angeles Clippers | 71.4% |
| FT% | CJ McCollum | Portland Trail Blazers | 91.2% |
| 3FG% | Kyle Korver | Atlanta Hawks/Cleveland Cavaliers | 45.1% |
| Player efficiency rating | Russell Westbrook | Oklahoma City Thunder | 30.7 |
| Double-doubles | James Harden | Houston Rockets | 64 |
| Triple-doubles | Russell Westbrook | Oklahoma City Thunder | 42 |

=== Individual game highs ===
| Category | Player | Team | Statistic |
|---|---|---|---|
| Points | Devin Booker | Phoenix Suns | 70 |
| Rebounds | Hassan Whiteside | Miami Heat | 25 |
| Rebounds | DeAndre Jordan | Los Angeles Clippers | 25 |
| Rebounds | Rudy Gobert | Utah Jazz | 25 |
| Assists | Russell Westbrook | Oklahoma City Thunder | 22 |
| Steals | Draymond Green | Golden State Warriors | 10 |
| Blocks | Brook Lopez | Brooklyn Nets | 8 |
| Blocks | Robin Lopez | Chicago Bulls | 8 |
| Blocks | Rudy Gobert | Utah Jazz | 8 |
| Three-pointers | Stephen Curry | Golden State Warriors | 13 |

=== Team statistic leaders ===
| Category | Team | Statistic |
|---|---|---|
| Points per game | Golden State Warriors | 116.0 |
| Rebounds per game | Oklahoma City Thunder | 46.6 |
| Assists per game | Golden State Warriors | 30.4 |
| Steals per game | Golden State Warriors | 9.5 |
| Blocks per game | Golden State Warriors | 6.7 |
| Turnovers per game | Philadelphia 76ers | 16.0 |
| FG% | Golden State Warriors | 49.5% |
| FT% | Charlotte Hornets | 81.5% |
| 3FG% | San Antonio Spurs | 39.1% |
| +/− | Golden State Warriors | +11.6 |

== Awards ==
=== Yearly awards ===
Awards were presented at the NBA Awards ceremony, which were held on June 26. Finalists for voted awards were announced during the playoffs and winners were presented at the award ceremony. The All-NBA Teams were announced in advance in order for teams to have all the necessary information to make off-season preparations.

2016–17 NBA awards
| Award | Recipient(s) | Runner(s)-up/Finalists |
|---|---|---|
| Most Valuable Player | Russell Westbrook (Oklahoma City Thunder) | James Harden (Houston Rockets); Kawhi Leonard (San Antonio Spurs) |
| Defensive Player of the Year | Draymond Green (Golden State Warriors) | Rudy Gobert (Utah Jazz); Kawhi Leonard (San Antonio Spurs) |
| Rookie of the Year | Malcolm Brogdon (Milwaukee Bucks) | Joel Embiid (Philadelphia 76ers); Dario Šarić (Philadelphia 76ers) |
| Sixth Man of the Year | Eric Gordon (Houston Rockets) | Andre Iguodala (Golden State Warriors); Lou Williams (Los Angeles Lakers/Houston Rockets) |
| Most Improved Player | Giannis Antetokounmpo (Milwaukee Bucks) | Rudy Gobert (Utah Jazz); Nikola Jokić (Denver Nuggets) |
| Coach of the Year | Mike D'Antoni (Houston Rockets) | Gregg Popovich (San Antonio Spurs); Erik Spoelstra (Miami Heat) |
| Executive of the Year | Bob Myers (Golden State Warriors) | |
| NBA Sportsmanship Award | Kemba Walker (Charlotte Hornets) | |
| J. Walter Kennedy Citizenship Award | LeBron James (Cleveland Cavaliers) | |
| Twyman–Stokes Teammate of the Year Award | Dirk Nowitzki (Dallas Mavericks) | |
| Community Assist Award | Isaiah Thomas (Boston Celtics) | |

- All-NBA First Team:
  - F Kawhi Leonard, San Antonio Spurs
  - F LeBron James, Cleveland Cavaliers
  - C Anthony Davis, New Orleans Pelicans
  - G James Harden, Houston Rockets
  - G Russell Westbrook, Oklahoma City Thunder
- All-NBA Second Team:
  - F Kevin Durant, Golden State Warriors
  - F Giannis Antetokounmpo, Milwaukee Bucks
  - C Rudy Gobert, Utah Jazz
  - G Stephen Curry, Golden State Warriors
  - G Isaiah Thomas, Boston Celtics
- All-NBA Third Team:
  - F Jimmy Butler, Chicago Bulls
  - F Draymond Green, Golden State Warriors
  - C DeAndre Jordan, Los Angeles Clippers
  - G DeMar DeRozan, Toronto Raptors
  - G John Wall, Washington Wizards

- NBA All-Defensive First Team:
  - F Kawhi Leonard, San Antonio Spurs
  - F Draymond Green, Golden State Warriors
  - C Rudy Gobert, Utah Jazz
  - G Patrick Beverley, Houston Rockets
  - G Chris Paul, Los Angeles Clippers
- NBA All-Defensive Second Team:
  - F Giannis Antetokounmpo, Milwaukee Bucks
  - F Andre Roberson, Oklahoma City Thunder
  - C Anthony Davis, New Orleans Pelicans
  - G Tony Allen, Memphis Grizzlies
  - G Danny Green, San Antonio Spurs

- NBA All-Rookie First Team:
  - F Dario Šarić, Philadelphia 76ers
  - C Willy Hernangómez, New York Knicks
  - C Joel Embiid, Philadelphia 76ers
  - G Malcolm Brogdon, Milwaukee Bucks
  - G Buddy Hield, Sacramento Kings
- NBA All-Rookie Second Team:
  - F Jaylen Brown, Boston Celtics
  - F Marquese Chriss, Phoenix Suns
  - F Brandon Ingram, Los Angeles Lakers
  - G Jamal Murray, Denver Nuggets
  - G Yogi Ferrell, Dallas Mavericks

=== Players of the Week ===
The following players were named the Eastern and Western Conference Players of the Week.

| Week | Eastern Conference | Western Conference | Ref. |
|---|---|---|---|
| October 25–30 | LeBron James (Cleveland Cavaliers) (1/4) | Russell Westbrook (Oklahoma City Thunder) (1/4) | |
| October 31 – November 6 | LeBron James (Cleveland Cavaliers) (2/4) | George Hill (Utah Jazz) (1/1) | |
| November 7–13 | DeMar DeRozan (Toronto Raptors) (1/4) | James Harden (Houston Rockets) (1/4) | |
| November 14–20 | Jimmy Butler (Chicago Bulls) (1/3) | Anthony Davis (New Orleans Pelicans) (1/1) | |
| November 21–27 | Kevin Love (Cleveland Cavaliers) (1/1) | Kevin Durant (Golden State Warriors) (1/1) | |
| November 28 – December 4 | Giannis Antetokounmpo (Milwaukee Bucks) (1/1) | Russell Westbrook (Oklahoma City Thunder) (2/4) | |
| December 5–11 | LeBron James (Cleveland Cavaliers) (3/4) | Marc Gasol (Memphis Grizzlies) (1/1) | |
| December 12–18 | DeMar DeRozan (Toronto Raptors) (2/4) | James Harden (Houston Rockets) (2/4) | |
| December 19–25 | Isaiah Thomas (Boston Celtics) (1/2) | Russell Westbrook (Oklahoma City Thunder) (3/4) | |
| December 26 – January 1 | John Wall (Washington Wizards) (1/2) | James Harden (Houston Rockets) (3/4) | |
| January 2–8 | Jimmy Butler (Chicago Bulls) (2/3) | Stephen Curry (Golden State Warriors) (1/3) | |
| January 9–15 | DeMar DeRozan (Toronto Raptors) (3/4) | Gordon Hayward (Utah Jazz) (1/1) | |
| January 16–22 | Joel Embiid (Philadelphia 76ers) (1/1) | Kawhi Leonard (San Antonio Spurs) (1/2) | |
| January 23–29 | Dion Waiters (Miami Heat) (1/1) | DeMarcus Cousins (Sacramento Kings) (1/1) | |
| January 30 – February 5 | Isaiah Thomas (Boston Celtics) (2/2) | Stephen Curry (Golden State Warriors) (2/3) | |
| February 6–12 | LeBron James (Cleveland Cavaliers) (4/4) | Blake Griffin (Los Angeles Clippers) (1/1) | |
| February 27 – March 5 | Kemba Walker (Charlotte Hornets) (1/1) | Kawhi Leonard (San Antonio Spurs) (2/2) | |
| March 6–12 | John Wall (Washington Wizards) (2/2) | Karl-Anthony Towns (Minnesota Timberwolves) (1/1) | |
| March 13–19 | Hassan Whiteside (Miami Heat) (1/1) | Damian Lillard (Portland Trail Blazers) (1/1) | |
| March 20–26 | DeMar DeRozan (Toronto Raptors) (4/4) | James Harden (Houston Rockets) (4/4) | |
| March 27 – April 2 | Jimmy Butler (Chicago Bulls) (3/3) | Stephen Curry (Golden State Warriors) (3/3) | |
| April 3–9 | Paul George (Indiana Pacers) (1/1) | Russell Westbrook (Oklahoma City Thunder) (4/4) | |

=== Players of the Month ===
The following players were named the Eastern and Western Conference Players of the Month.

| Month | Eastern Conference | Western Conference | Ref. |
|---|---|---|---|
| October/November | LeBron James (Cleveland Cavaliers) (1/2) | Russell Westbrook (Oklahoma City Thunder) (1/2) | |
| December | John Wall (Washington Wizards) (1/1) | James Harden (Houston Rockets) (1/1) | |
| January | Isaiah Thomas (Boston Celtics) (1/1) | Stephen Curry (Golden State Warriors) (1/1); Kevin Durant (Golden State Warriors) (1/1) | |
| February | LeBron James (Cleveland Cavaliers) (2/2) | Russell Westbrook (Oklahoma City Thunder) (2/2) | |
| March | Giannis Antetokounmpo (Milwaukee Bucks) (1/1) | Damian Lillard (Portland Trail Blazers) (1/1) | |
| April | Paul George (Indiana Pacers) (1/1) | Chris Paul (Los Angeles Clippers) (1/1) | |

=== Rookies of the Month ===
The following players were named the Eastern and Western Conference Rookies of the Month.

| Month | Eastern Conference | Western Conference | Ref. |
|---|---|---|---|
| October/November | Joel Embiid (Philadelphia 76ers) (1/3) | Jamal Murray (Denver Nuggets) (1/1) | |
| December | Joel Embiid (Philadelphia 76ers) (2/3) | Buddy Hield (New Orleans Pelicans) (1/2) | |
| January | Joel Embiid (Philadelphia 76ers) (3/3) | Marquese Chriss (Phoenix Suns) (1/1) | |
| February | Dario Šarić (Philadelphia 76ers) (1/2) | Yogi Ferrell (Dallas Mavericks) (1/1) | |
| March | Dario Šarić (Philadelphia 76ers) (2/2) | Buddy Hield (Sacramento Kings) (2/2) | |
| April | Willy Hernangómez (New York Knicks) (1/1) | Tyler Ulis (Phoenix Suns) (1/1) | |

=== Coaches of the Month ===
The following coaches were named the Eastern and Western Conference Coaches of the Month.

| Month | Eastern Conference | Western Conference | Ref. |
|---|---|---|---|
| October/November | Tyronn Lue (Cleveland Cavaliers) (1/1) | Steve Kerr (Golden State Warriors) (1/2) | |
| December | Dwane Casey (Toronto Raptors) (1/1) | Mike D'Antoni (Houston Rockets) (1/1) | |
| January | Scott Brooks (Washington Wizards) (1/1) | Steve Kerr (Golden State Warriors) (2/2) | |
| February | Erik Spoelstra (Miami Heat) (1/1) | Gregg Popovich (San Antonio Spurs) (1/1) | |
| March | Jason Kidd (Milwaukee Bucks) (1/1) | Terry Stotts (Portland Trail Blazers) (1/1) | |
| April | Nate McMillan (Indiana Pacers) (1/1) | Doc Rivers (Los Angeles Clippers) (1/1) | |

== Arenas ==
- This was the first season for the Sacramento Kings at the new Golden 1 Center after playing at the Sleep Train Arena from 1988 to 2016. They played their first regular season game there on October 27, 2016, against the San Antonio Spurs.
- On November 22, 2016, the Detroit Pistons announced that the 2016–17 season would be their last at The Palace of Auburn Hills and that they would be relocating to the new Little Caesars Arena in Midtown Detroit beginning in the 2017–18 season.
- On January 17, 2017, the Golden State Warriors officially broke ground on the Chase Center in San Francisco. The arena was completed during the 2019–2020 season.
- The Charlotte Hornets' home arena Time Warner Cable Arena was renamed to Spectrum Center.

== Uniforms ==
- On May 12, 2016, the Utah Jazz unveiled new uniforms.
- On June 15, 2016, the Sacramento Kings unveiled new uniforms.
- On September 14, 2016, the Brooklyn Nets unveiled new alternate uniforms.
- On September 23, 2016, the Golden State Warriors unveiled new alternate uniforms.
- On April 11, 2017, the Minnesota Timberwolves unveiled their new logo and uniforms to enter the 2017–18 NBA season.
- On May 8, 2017, the Portland Trail Blazers unveiled their new logo to enter the 2017–18 NBA season. Their uniforms were released during the draft.
- On May 16, 2017, the Detroit Pistons unveiled their new logo to enter the 2017–18 NBA season. They announced that it would honor the "Bad Boys" Pistons of the 1980s and 1990s.

== Media ==
This was the first season of the new nine-year U.S. television contracts with ABC, ESPN, TNT, and NBA TV.

In Canada, rights were divided between the TSN and Sportsnet groups of channels and NBA TV Canada. These rights are of indefinite duration, as NBA TV Canada is owned by the Toronto Raptors' ownership group, Maple Leaf Sports & Entertainment, which in turn is controlled by the parent companies of TSN and Sportsnet (Bell Canada and Rogers Communications, respectively). TSN and Sportsnet each have rights to 41 Toronto Raptors regular season games and over 100 other regular season games, and were expected (as in 2015–16) to share coverage of NBA All-Star Weekend, and split coverage of the playoffs and the NBA Finals. NBA TV Canada carried 105 additional regular season games, plus replays of other games carried on TSN and Sportsnet.

== Notable occurrences ==
- The 2016–17 NBA schedule featured a historic low of "back-to-back" games, along with teams playing four games in a five-day stretch. It was the first schedule created with a new optimization computer program that the NBA described at the MIT Sport Analytic Conference.
- The season also saw the league's timing systems, including the official game clock and shot clock united for the first time under a long-term sponsorship and equipment deal with Swiss watchmaker Tissot; the deal included the prominence of the Tissot logo on each court game clock/shot clock unit, which was redesigned to be both more clearly visible by spectators and with materials in the number elements that are more "see-through" than the previous Daktronics or OES models used by individual venues.
- On October 25, LeBron James recorded his 43rd career triple-double in a win against the New York Knicks, becoming the first player since Jason Kidd in 2006 to post a triple-double on Opening Night.
- On October 26, Anthony Davis scored 50 points in a 107–102 loss to the Denver Nuggets, becoming just the fourth player in NBA history to score 50+ points on Opening Night.
- On October 28, Russell Westbrook registered the first 50-point triple double since Kareem Abdul-Jabbar in 1975 in an overtime win against the Phoenix Suns, recording 51 points, 13 rebounds, and 10 assists—the third highest point total ever in a triple-double.
- On November 1, James Harden recorded 41 points and 15 assists in a loss against the Cleveland Cavaliers. The next night, Harden scored 30 points with 15 assists in a win against the New York Knicks, becoming the first player to register at least 30 points and 15 assists in back-to-back games since Magic Johnson in 1986–87.
- On November 4, DeMar DeRozan scored 34 points in a win against the Miami Heat, becoming the first player since Michael Jordan in 1986 to score 30+ points in the first five games to start the season.
- On November 4, Chris Paul recorded his 3,499th career assist with the Los Angeles Clippers in a win against the Memphis Grizzlies, becoming the franchise's all-time leader in assists, passing Randy Smith.
- On November 5, LeBron James scored his 26,947th career point in a win against the Philadelphia 76ers, passing Hakeem Olajuwon for 10th on the all-time scoring list.
- On November 7, John Wall passed Wes Unseld to become the Washington Wizards' franchise leader in career assists.
- On November 7, Stephen Curry made 13 three-pointers against the New Orleans Pelicans, setting a new NBA record for most three-pointers made by a player in a single game, breaking the previous record of 12 shared by Curry himself, along with Kobe Bryant and Donyell Marshall.
- On November 11, LeBron James scored his 27,000th career point in a win against the Wizards, becoming the youngest player in NBA history to reach that milestone (31 years, 317 days).
- On November 18, the San Antonio Spurs defeated the Los Angeles Lakers, giving Spurs coach Gregg Popovich his 1,099th career victory as head coach, passing Larry Brown for seventh place all-time in coaching career wins. He'd record his 1,100th career victory as head coach three days later against the Dallas Mavericks.
- On November 23, Kevin Love scored 34 points in the first quarter of a win against the Portland Trail Blazers, setting an NBA record for most points scored in the first quarter, and second most in any quarter. Love finished the quarter 11-of-14 from the field and 8-of-10 from three, shattering the franchise's old record for both points and three-pointers in a quarter.
- On November 23, LeBron James recorded his 44th career triple-double in a win against the Portland Trail Blazers, passing Fat Lever for sixth all-time.
- On November 23, the Golden State Warriors set a franchise record with 47 team assists in a 149–106 win against the Los Angeles Lakers.
- On November 25, the Houston Rockets set an NBA record by attempting 50 three-pointers in a 117–104 win against the Sacramento Kings, breaking the previous record of 49 set by the Dallas Mavericks in 1996.
- On November 26, Russell Westbrook recorded his 44th career triple-double in a win over the Detroit Pistons, passing Fat Lever and tying LeBron James for sixth all-time.
- On November 29, the Houston Rockets scored at least ten three-pointers in their 17th consecutive game, setting an NBA record.
- On November 29, in all six games, the team with the worst record ended up winning, making it only the second time in NBA history that's happened this late into the season (January 7, 1969).
- On November 30, Russell Westbrook scored his fourth straight triple-double and in doing so became the first player since Oscar Robertson in 1961–62 to average a triple-double into the month of December.
- On December 1, in a 132–127 double-overtime win by the Houston Rockets over the Golden State Warriors, the two teams combined for 88 three-point attempts, setting an NBA record, with each team attempting 44 three's, also marking the first game in NBA history that both teams in a single game each attempted 40+ three-pointers.
- On December 4, Russell Westbrook recorded a triple-double in his fifth straight game, the first player to achieve that feat since Michael Jordan in 1989.
- On December 5, Klay Thompson scored 60 points (shooting 21-of-33 and 8-of-14 on three-pointers) in 29 minutes over just three quarters in a 142–106 win over the Indiana Pacers. Thompson became the first person in the shot-clock era to score 60 points in less than 30 minutes, and the first to score at least 60 points in three quarters since Kobe Bryant scored 62 against the Mavericks in December 2005.
- On December 9, LeBron James passed Elvin Hayes for ninth on the all-time scoring list with 27,315 career points.
- On December 9, Russell Westbrook recorded his seventh straight triple-double in a loss against the Houston Rockets, tying Michael Jordan and Oscar Robertson for the second longest streak of such in NBA history.
- On December 10, Chris Paul recorded 20 points, 20 assists without a turnovers in a win against the New Orleans Pelicans, the first person in NBA history to achieve those stats since turnovers first started being recorded in 1977.
- On December 10, LeBron James recorded his 7,000th career assist, becoming the first frontcourt player, and 16th overall, in NBA history to reach that mark.
- On December 14, the NBA tentatively completed an agreement with the NBA Players Association for their new Collective Bargaining Agreement. Major noteworthy notes about the agreement include the return of a six-year extension for a player on a team, an update on some of the fixed salaries, the introduction of two-way contracts for teams to have two extra players on their team for the purpose of developing in the NBA Development League while also improving the payment for players there, a shortened preseason with an earlier regular season starting point, and the extension of five-year contracts given to players nearing the age of 38 instead of the age of 36. The official signing was complete on January 19, 2017.
- On December 15, 2016; Turner Sports Reporter, Craig Sager, died from acute myeloid leukemia after being diagnosed in 2014.
- On December 16, the Houston Rockets made 24 three-pointers on 61 attempts in a win against the New Orleans Pelicans, setting the NBA records for both most made and attempted three-point field goals in a regular season game.
- On December 17, Russell Westbrook became just the sixth player in NBA history to amass 50 career triple-doubles, and became the first player since Magic Johnson in 1988 to record a 25-point, 20 assist triple-double.
- On December 20, LeBron James passed Moses Malone for eighth on the all-time scoring list with 27,410 career points.
- On December 31, James Harden recorded 53 points, 16 rebounds, and 17 assists in a win against the New York Knicks. It was the first 50–15–15 game in NBA history, and Harden tied Wilt Chamberlain for the most points ever scored in a triple-double.
- On January 2, Jimmy Butler scored 52 points in a win against the Charlotte Hornets, becoming the eighth different player this season to score 50 points in a game, tying an NBA record for most in a single season (1990 and 2016). The other players to score 50 this season were James Harden, Isaiah Thomas, DeMarcus Cousins, John Wall, Klay Thompson, Anthony Davis, and Russell Westbrook.
- On January 6, Chris Paul passed Rod Strickland for tenth on the all-time assists list with 7,988 career assists, and two days later, became the tenth player all-time to record 8,000 career assists.
- On January 8, LeBron James became just the 14th player in NBA history to record 10,000 career field goals in a win against the Phoenix Suns.
- On January 11, LeBron James passed Tim Hardaway for 15th on the all-time assists list with 7,096. James became the only player to be in the top 10 on the all-time scoring list and top 15 in assists.
- On January 12, the Denver Nuggets played against the Indiana Pacers at The O2 Arena in London. The Nuggets would blow out the Pacers by the final score of 140–112.
- The Phoenix Suns played against the Dallas Mavericks and San Antonio Spurs at the Mexico City Arena on January 12 and 14, 2017. The Suns would lose their game against the Mavericks by the score of 113–108, but would win against the Spurs with the final score of 108–105.
- On January 25, Russell Westbrook recorded his 60th career triple-double, passing Larry Bird for fifth all-time in NBA history.
- On January 26, Vince Carter turned 40 years old, becoming just the 16th player ever to play in his 40s in the NBA.
- On January 27, James Harden recorded a 51-point, 13 rebound, 13 assist triple-double in a win against the Philadelphia 76ers, becoming the first player in NBA history to record multiple 50-point triple-doubles in the same season, and tying Oscar Robertson for the most 40-point triple-doubles in a single season with five.
- On January 28, the Golden State Warriors beat the Los Angeles Clippers 144–98 for their 40th win of the season, becoming the first team in NBA history to win at least 40 of their first 50 games three seasons in a row.
- On February 3, the Boston Celtics beat the Los Angeles Lakers 113–107, giving the Celtics franchise its 3,253rd all-time win, passing the aforementioned Lakers for most wins by a single franchise in NBA history.
- On February 4, LeBron James scored his 28,000th career point, becoming the youngest player, and just the eighth overall, to reach that mark (32 years, 36 days).
- On February 4, Gregg Popovich earned his 1,128th career coaching victory with the San Antonio Spurs, passing Jerry Sloan for most coaching wins with a single franchise in NBA history.
- On February 6, LeBron James passed Lenny Wilkens for 13th on the NBA's all-time assist list with 7,227 career assists.
- On February 7, Dirk Nowitzki passed John Havlicek for tenth all-time in NBA history in field goals made with 10,514 career field goals.
- On February 8, the Miami Heat won their 12th straight game in a row, making it the longest winning streak for a team below .500 in NBA history, passing the 1996–97 Phoenix Suns. The streak would reach 13 straight before losing to the Philadelphia 76ers on February 11.
- On February 10, Draymond Green became the first player in NBA history to record a triple-double while failing to score in double figures. In the Warriors' 122–107 win over the Memphis Grizzlies, Green only scored four points, but collected 12 rebounds, ten assists, and ten steals. Green also became the first player to record ten steals and five blocks in a game since those became official NBA statistics in the 1973–74 season.
- On February 12, Carmelo Anthony passed Charles Barkley for 25th on the all-time scoring list.
- On February 13, the San Antonio Spurs earned their 42nd victory of the season, clinching the franchise's 20th straight winning season, setting an NBA record for most consecutive winning seasons by a single team.
- On February 13, the Denver Nuggets made 24 three-pointers in a 132–110 win against the Golden State Warriors. The Nuggets' 24 three-pointers tied the NBA record for most three-pointers made in a single regular season game, along with the Houston Rockets who set the record earlier in the season on December 16.
- On February 15, Vince Carter passed Allen Iverson for 23rd on the all-time scoring list with 24,369 career points.
- On February 15, Russell Westbrook recorded his 27th triple-double of the season, moving into sole possession of third place all-time for most triple-doubles in a single season behind Oscar Robertson's 41 in 1962 and Wilt Chamberlain's 31 in 1968.
- On February 15, Kyle Korver made his 2,000th career three-pointer, becoming just the seventh player in NBA history to reach that milestone.
- On February 16, Isaiah Thomas set a Boston Celtics franchise record by scoring 20+ points in his 41st straight game, breaking the previous record of 40 straight by John Havlicek.
- On February 25, the Golden State Warriors became the quickest team in NBA history to clinch a playoff spot, beating the record set by last year's Warriors team by two days (February 27).
- On February 27, Stephen Curry shot 0-for-11 on three-point attempts in a win against the Philadelphia 76ers, becoming just the fourth player in NBA history to make no three-pointers while attempting at least eleven such shots.
- During the month of March, the NBA would break the record for most triple-doubles recorded in a single season.
- On March 1, the Detroit Pistons shot 3-of-17 on free throws in a loss against the New Orleans Pelicans, setting a record for the lowest free-throw percentage (17.6%) in a game in NBA history (minimum 10 attempts).
- On March 2, the Golden State Warriors lost their second consecutive game, snapping their NBA record streak of 146 straight regular season games without consecutive losses which dated back to April 2015.
- On March 3, the Cleveland Cavaliers made 25 three-pointers in a win against the Atlanta Hawks, setting the NBA regular-season record for most three-pointers made in a game, surpassing the record of 24 set by the Rockets and Nuggets earlier in the season.
- On March 4, Eric Gordon made his 180th three-pointer of the season in his 49th game as a reserve, setting an NBA record for the most three-pointers made in a season by a player off the bench. The previous record of 179 three-pointers was set by Mirza Teletović last year in 78 games.
- On March 4, Ricky Rubio recorded the 79th triple-double of the season throughout the NBA, breaking the record of 78 set in 1988–89 for most triple-doubles in a single season in NBA history.
- On March 7, Russell Westbrook scored a career high 58 points in a loss against the Portland Trail Blazers, tying Fred Brown for most points scored in a game in Seattle SuperSonics/Oklahoma City Thunder franchise history.
- On March 7, Dirk Nowitzki scored his 30,000th career point in a win against the Los Angeles Lakers, becoming just the sixth player in NBA history to reach that milestone–Kareem Abdul-Jabaar, Karl Malone, Kobe Bryant, Michael Jordan, and Wilt Chamberlain.
- On March 22, Russell Westbrook became the first player in NBA history to record a triple-double while making all of his attempted baskets and free throws. In the Thunder's 122–97 win over the Philadelphia 76ers, he went 6-for-6 from both the floor and the line while collecting 18 points, 11 rebounds, and 14 assists.
- On March 24, Devin Booker became the sixth player in NBA history to score at least 70 points in a game. In addition, Booker became the youngest player in NBA history to score at least 60 points in a game, breaking David Thompson's record.
- On March 29, Russell Westbrook scored 57 points in a victory against the Orlando Magic along with 13 rebounds and 11 assists, it was his 38th triple double of the season and the highest points scored in a triple double.
- On March 29, Vince Carter passed Ray Allen for 22nd on the all-time scoring list with 24,511 career points.
- On March 30, LeBron James passed Shaquille O'Neal for seventh on the all-time regular season scoring list, with 28,597 points.
- On April 2, Russell Westbrook became the second player in NBA history to get 40 triple-doubles in a single season during the Oklahoma City Thunder's 113–101 loss against the Charlotte Hornets. Westbrook had 40 points, 13 rebounds, and 10 assists against the Hornets. In doing so, Westbrook moved within one triple double of tying the single season record that was set by Oscar Robertson in the 1961–62 season.
- On April 4, Russell Westbrook recorded his 41st triple-double of the season in the Thunder's 110–79 win over the Milwaukee Bucks, tying the NBA record of most triple doubles in a single season set by Oscar Robertson during the 1961–62 NBA season.
- On April 4, LeBron James scored at least 10 points in his 788th consecutive game, passing Kareem Abdul-Jabbar for second on the all-time list. Only Michael Jordan has a longer such streak with 866 straight games.
- On April 7, Russell Westbrook ensured he would finish the season averaging a triple-double. Entering the Thunder's game against the Phoenix Suns, Westbrook needed six assists to reach 820 for the season, the final number he needed to clinch a triple-double average; he reached the mark early in the third quarter. The only other player to average a triple-double for a season is Oscar Robertson, who accomplished it with the Cincinnati Royals during the 1961–62 NBA season.
- On April 8, Rudy Gobert ensured that he would finish the season with 1,000 points, 1,000 rebounds, and 200 blocks during a loss to the Portland Trail Blazers. This is the 23rd time a player has accomplished this feat in NBA history.
- On April 9, Russell Westbrook recorded 50 points, 16 rebounds, and 10 assists during the Oklahoma City Thunder's 106–105 victory against the Denver Nuggets. This was Westbrook's 42nd triple double of the season, breaking the NBA record for most triple-doubles in a single season that was previously held by Oscar Robertson. It would also be his third game where he scored 50 or more points while recording a triple-double.
- On April 12, during the Memphis Grizzlies final game of the regular season, Vince Carter passed Kobe Bryant for regular season games played with 1,347 for 13th place.
- By the end of the regular season, Vince Carter, Jamal Crawford and Kyle Korver ended up with a triple-tie in career 3-pointers made with 2,049 each for 5th place.
- This season became the first one since the 1963–64 NBA season in which no coaches were fired during the regular season.
- Giannis Antetokounmpo led the Bucks in every one of the five major statistical categories (points, rebounds, assists, steals and blocks) in the 2016–17 regular season, becoming only the fifth NBA player to do so after Dave Cowens, Scottie Pippen, Kevin Garnett and LeBron James. He also became the first player in NBA history to finish in the top 20 in the league in each of the five major categories in a regular season.
- On April 20, the Cleveland Cavaliers erased a 25-point halftime deficit in their 119–114 victory over the Indiana Pacers, which, at the time, was the largest such deficit overcome in NBA playoff history.
- On April 23, with the Cleveland Cavaliers' victory over the Indiana Pacers, LeBron James achieved his 10th playoff series sweep, the most all-time, passing Tim Duncan. It was also James' 21st consecutive victory in the first round, also an NBA record.
- On April 28, the Los Angeles Clippers defeated the Utah Jazz 98–93 to force a Game 7, making this season the 18th in succession to feature at least one game seven in the postseason.
- The Cleveland Cavaliers and the Golden State Warriors both started 8–0 in the postseason. This is the first time in NBA history that two or more teams have each won their first eight postseason games.
- On May 18, LeBron James was named to the All-NBA first team for a record-tying 11th time, tying Karl Malone and Kobe Bryant.
- On May 19, the Cleveland Cavaliers held a 72–31 lead over the Boston Celtics at halftime, setting the record for largest playoff halftime lead (41 points) in NBA history. The previous record had been 40, set by the Detroit Pistons against the Washington Bullets in 1987. The final score, a 130–86 Cavaliers victory, was the worst loss (44 points) for a #1 seed in NBA history. This was also the Cavaliers' 13th straight playoff victory dating back to 2016, which tied them with the Los Angeles Lakers in 1988 and 1989 for the longest playoff winning streak by a team in NBA history.
- On May 19, LeBron James had his 8th straight playoff game with 30+ points, tying the record held by Michael Jordan.
- On May 22, the Golden State Warriors became the first team in NBA history to begin a postseason 12–0 and the first team in NBA history to achieve three consecutive sweeps in best-of-seven playoff series with their 129–115 victory over the San Antonio Spurs. The Los Angeles Lakers previously swept the first three rounds in both 1989 and 2001, but both times occurred when the first round was still played in a best-of-five format.
- On May 25, LeBron James surpassed Michael Jordan to become the all-time leader in career playoff points, with 5,988.
- The Cleveland Cavaliers and Golden State Warriors met in the NBA Finals for the third consecutive year, making them the first pair of teams in NBA history to face off in the NBA Finals three consecutive times.
- On June 4, the Warriors defeated the Cleveland Cavaliers 132–113 in Game 2 of the NBA Finals to take a 2–0 series lead. Golden State improved to 14–0 this postseason, with their 14-game winning streak setting a new NBA playoff record for most consecutive victories. The Warriors also surpassed their own NBA record for three-point field goals made in a Finals game with 18.
- On June 4, LeBron James and Stephen Curry became the first set of opposing players to each record a triple-double in an NBA postseason game since 1970.
- On June 7, the Warriors set two NBA Finals records during a 118–113 Game 3 win over the Cavaliers: most three-point field goals made in a quarter (9 in the first quarter) and in a half (12 in the first half). The Warriors improved to 15–0 this postseason and extended the NBA's longest ever playoff win streak to 15 games.
- On June 9, the Cavaliers defeated the Warriors 137–116 in Game 4 of the NBA Finals, snapping the Warriors' record playoff winning streak at 15 games. Several NBA Finals records were broken during the game. The Cavaliers set NBA Finals records for most points in a quarter (49 in the first quarter) and in a half (86 in the first half) in addition to most made three-pointers in a half (13 in the first half, which broke the record set by Golden State in the first half of Game 3 of this year's Finals only two days earlier) and in a game (24 total, which broke the record set by Golden State in Game 2 of this year's Finals only five days earlier). The Cavaliers and Warriors also scored a combined 154 points during the first half, setting an NBA Finals record for most combined points in a half. Finally, LeBron James recorded his ninth career triple double in an NBA Finals game, which surpassed Magic Johnson for the most career triple-doubles in Finals history.
- On June 12, the Golden State Warriors set a new NBA record by finishing the postseason 16–1, winning the 2017 NBA Finals and defeating the defending champions Cleveland Cavaliers.
- LeBron James becomes first player in NBA history to finish the Final series averaging a triple-double.

== See also ==
- List of NBA regular season records
