= Dave Joerger =

American basketball coach (born 1974)

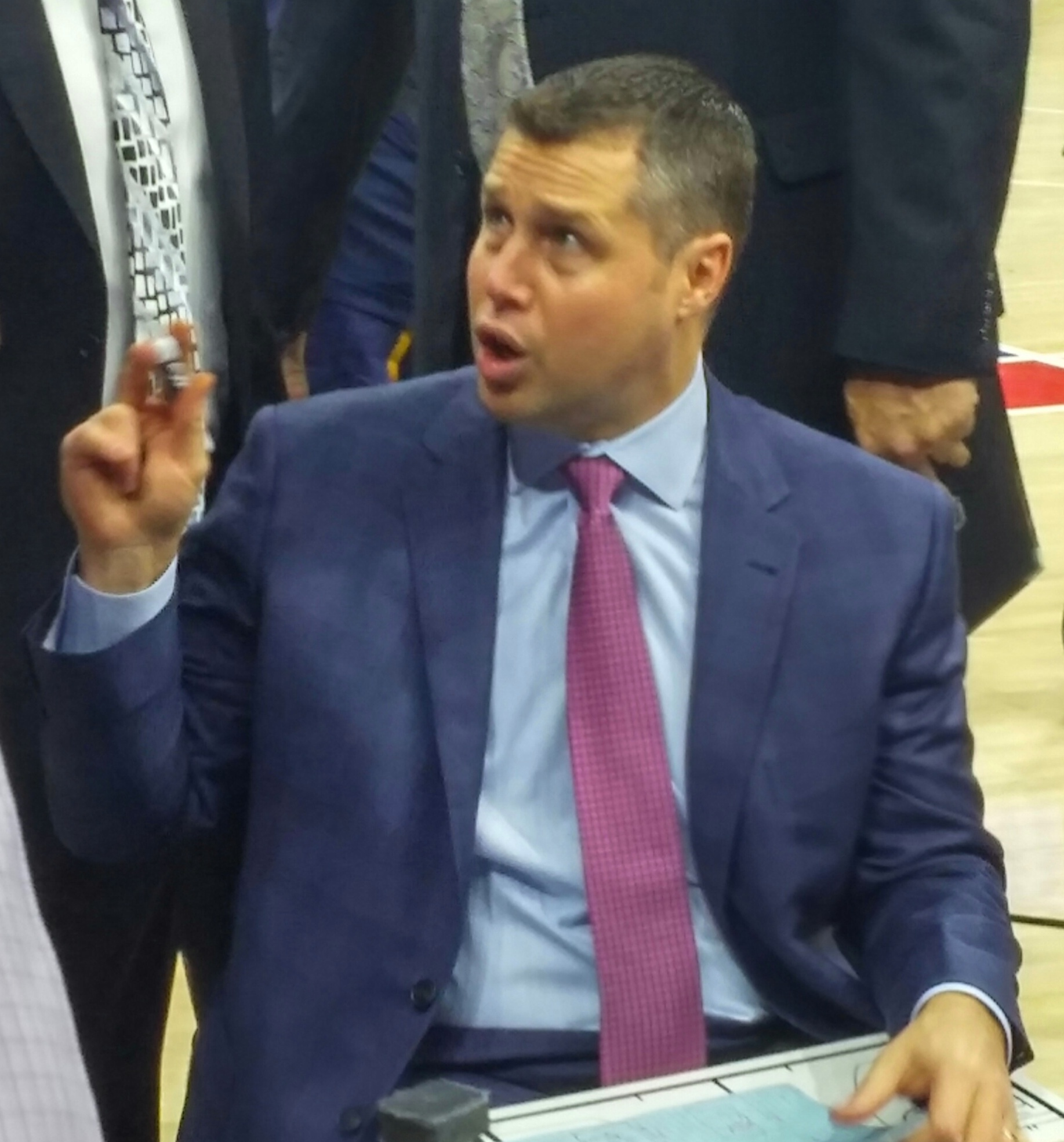
- Joerger in 2015

Denver Nuggets
- Title: Assistant coach
- League: NBA

Personal information
- Born: February 21, 1974 (age 52) Staples, Minnesota, U.S.

Career information
- High school: Staples-Motley (Staples, Minnesota)
- College: Concordia (Minnesota) (1992–1994); Minnesota State–Moorhead (1995–1997)
- Position: Point guard
- Coaching career: 1997–present

Career history

Coaching
- 1997–2000: Dakota Wizards (assistant)
- 2000–2004: Dakota Wizards
- 2004: Cedar Rapids River Raiders
- 2004–2006: Sioux Falls Skyforce
- 2006–2007: Dakota Wizards
- 2007–2013: Memphis Grizzlies (assistant)
- 2013–2016: Memphis Grizzlies
- 2016–2019: Sacramento Kings
- 2020–2023: Philadelphia 76ers (assistant)
- 2024–2026: Milwaukee Bucks (assistant)
- 2026–present: Denver Nuggets (assistant)

Career highlights
- As head coach: NBA D-League champion (2007); IBA champion (2001); 3× CBA champion (2002, 2004, 2005); 2× CBA Coach of the Year (2002, 2004); As assistant coach: NBA Cup champion (2024)

David Joerger (/ˈjeɪɡər/ YAY-ger; born February 21, 1974) is an American professional basketball coach who is an assistant coach for the Denver Nuggets of the National Basketball Association (NBA). He was the head coach of the Dakota Wizards from 2000 to 2004 and in 2006–2007 in the International Basketball Association, Continental Basketball Association, and the NBA Development League, winning championships in 2001, 2002, 2004, and 2007. He also coached the Sioux Falls Skyforce from 2004 to 2006, winning a championship in 2005. In the NBA, Joerger served as head coach of the Memphis Grizzlies from 2013 to 2016, and Sacramento Kings from 2016 to 2019.

== Early coaching career ==
Joerger played college basketball at Concordia College and Moorhead State (now known as Minnesota State University Moorhead). He played as a point guard.

Joerger joined the Dakota Wizards of the International Basketball Association as the team's general manager. He became the team's assistant coach in 1997 and eventually took over as the head coach for the 2000–01 IBA season. Joerger had immediate success as a head coach, leading his team to a 30–10 regular season record. After being down 0–2 in the IBA Finals best-of-5 series, the Wizards came back to defeat the Des Moines Dragons 3–2, winning their first championship.

== IBA to CBA ==
Joerger remained with the Wizards as IBA, IBL, and CBA teams merged to create the new Continental Basketball Association after the league declared bankruptcy under the ownership of Isiah Thomas. As a former IBA team, the Wizards were declared "lower-tier" in the 2001–02 season and were given a shorter schedule with two other former IBA teams and an expansion team to make up the National Conference. With Joerger at the helm, the Wizards finished with a league-leading 26–14 record. For his success, Joerger was named the CBA Coach of the Year. After sweeping the Fargo-Moorhead Beez 3–0 in the conference finals, Joerger won his first CBA championship as his team defeated the Rockford Lightning 116–109 in a winner-take-all championship game.

Joerger continued to have success with the Wizards in the CBA, reaching the conference finals with a league-leading 31–17 regular season record in 2002–03 before losing to the Yakima Sun Kings 3–1. Throughout the 2003–04 season, Joerger lost six players to NBA call-ups, which included Sean Lampley, Oliver Miller, Kaniel Dickens, Maurice Carter, Eddie Gill, and Rodney Buford. Despite losing talent, Joerger still managed to coach his team to a league-best 34–14 regular season record, and was again named the CBA Coach of the Year. With Dickens and Carter back from the NBA, the Wizards defeated the Rockford Lightning 3–1 in the semi-finals and won their second CBA championship with a 132–129 victory over the Idaho Stampede.

Following another championship season and a stint with the USBL's Cedar Rapids River Raiders, Joerger left the Wizards for an opportunity to coach the Sioux Falls Skyforce. With the Skyforce, a franchise that had missed the play-offs the past few seasons, Joerger had immediate success, guiding them to a 31–17 record and faced off against his former assistant, Casey Owens, and the Dakota Wizards in the conference finals. In 5 games, the Skyforce came out on top and went on to defeat the Rockford Lightning 3–1 for the 2004–05 CBA championship. In the 2005–06 season, despite going 2–0 in a round-robin playoff format based on quarter point percentage, Joerger missed out on just his second championship as a head coach after a 30–18 regular season.

== CBA to D-League ==
In April 2006, the Skyforce, the Wizards, and the Idaho Stampede made the jump from the CBA to the NBA Development League. In May, Joerger left the Skyforce and returned to the Wizards as the head coach once again. As expected, Joerger had immediate success in the D-League, guiding the Wizards to a league-best 33–17 record. After a first round bye, Joerger's team knocked off the Skyforce 115–113 in a one-and-done semi-final and went on to defeat the Colorado 14ers 129–121 in a classic overtime championship game.

== NBA ==
=== Memphis Grizzlies ===
With five minor league championships under his belt, the National Basketball Association finally took notice and Joerger was hired by the Memphis Grizzlies as an assistant coach for the 2007–08 season under head coach Marc Iavaroni. In 2011, under Lionel Hollins, Joerger was promoted to lead assistant and took over as the team's defense specialist. The Grizzlies improved in defensive efficiency from 24th overall in 2010 to 9th in 2011, 7th in 2012, and 2nd in 2013.

On June 10, 2013, the Grizzlies organization announced that Lionel Hollins would not be returning as the team's head coach, despite reaching the conference finals for the first time in franchise history. On June 27, 2013, Joerger was hired as the Grizzlies' head coach for the 2013–14 season.

In his first year, Joerger was named the Western Conference Coach of the Month in both January and April.

On May 28, 2014, it was announced that Joerger was signed to a 3-year contract extension. On May 7, 2016, Joerger was fired by the Grizzlies after three seasons as the team's head coach.

=== Sacramento Kings ===
On May 9, 2016, just two days after being fired by the Grizzlies, Joerger signed with the Sacramento Kings to become their head coach. On April 11, 2019, the Kings fired Joerger after the team failed to reach the playoffs in three seasons under Joerger; in his last season as coach, the Kings had their best record since they last reached the playoffs in the 2005–06 season.

=== Philadelphia 76ers ===
On November 9, 2020, the Philadelphia 76ers hired Joerger as an assistant coach under Doc Rivers.

A few games into the 2021–22 season, it was reported that Joerger would be seeking treatment for cancer, and would be away from the team for several weeks.

=== Cleveland Cavaliers ===
Shortly before the start of the 2023–24 NBA season, Joerger joined the Cleveland Cavaliers as a consultant to head coach J.B. Bickerstaff.

=== Milwaukee Bucks ===
In January 2024 Joerger was added to the Milwaukee Bucks' staff as an assistant coach by Doc Rivers. Joerger had previously been an assistant under Doc Rivers in Philadelphia.

=== Denver Nuggets ===
On August 5, 2026, the Denver Nuggets hired Joerger to serve as an assistant coach under head coach David Adelman.

== Head coaching record ==
Legend
| Regular season | G | Games coached | W | Games won | L | Games lost | W–L % | Win–loss % |
| Playoffs | PG | Playoff games | PW | Playoff wins | PL | Playoff losses | PW–L % | Playoff win–loss % |

| Team | Year | G | W | L | W–L% | Finish | PG | PW | PL | PW–L% | Result |
|---|---|---|---|---|---|---|---|---|---|---|---|
| Memphis | 2013–14 | 82 | 50 | 32 | .610 | 3rd in Southwest | 7 | 3 | 4 | .429 | Lost in First round |
| Memphis | 2014–15 | 82 | 55 | 27 | .671 | 2nd in Southwest | 11 | 6 | 5 | .545 | Lost in Conference semifinals |
| Memphis | 2015–16 | 82 | 42 | 40 | .512 | 3rd in Southwest | 4 | 0 | 4 | .000 | Lost in First round |
| Sacramento | 2016–17 | 82 | 32 | 50 | .390 | 3rd in Pacific | — | — | — | — | Missed playoffs |
| Sacramento | 2017–18 | 82 | 27 | 55 | .329 | 4th in Pacific | — | — | — | — | Missed playoffs |
| Sacramento | 2018–19 | 82 | 39 | 43 | .476 | 3rd in Pacific | — | — | — | — | Missed playoffs |
| Career | | 492 | 245 | 247 | .498 | | 22 | 9 | 13 | .409 | |
