= 2006 NBA Development League draft =

General information
- Sport: Basketball
- Date: November 2, 2006

Overview
- League: NBA
- First selection: Corsley Edwards, Anaheim Arsenal

The 2006 NBA Development League draft was the sixth annual draft by the NBA Development League. It was held on November 2, 2006.

== Key ==
Pos.	G	F	C
Position	Guard	Forward	Center

^	Denotes player who has been selected to (an) NBA Development League All-Star Game(s)
*	Denotes player who has been selected to (an) NBA Development League All-Star Game(s) and was also selected in an NBA draft
†	Denotes player who was also selected in an NBA Draft

== Draft ==
=== Round 1 ===
Pick	Player	Position	Nationality	Team	College/From
1	Corsley Edwards^{†}	C-PF	United States	Anaheim Arsenal	CB Granada Spain
2	Andre Brown	C-PF	United States	Sioux Falls Skyforce	Inchon ET Land Black Slamer
3	Mike Harris	SF	United States	Colorado 14ers	Milwaukee Bucks (preseason)
4	Kevin Burleson	PG	United States	Fort Worth Flyers	Charlotte Bobcats
5	Justin Williams	PF-C	United States	Dakota Wizards	Wyoming
6	Matt Haryasz	C-PF	United States	Arkansas RimRockers	Stanford
7	Devin Green	SG-SF	United States	Los Angeles D-Fenders	Los Angeles Lakers
8	Denham Brown^{†}	SG-SF	Canada	Tulsa 66ers	Connecticut
9	PJ Ramos^{†}	C	Puerto Rico	Idaho Stampede	Roanoke Dazzle (NBA D-League)
10	Darius Washington, Jr.	PG/SG	United States	Austin Toros	ČEZ Nymburk
11	Brandon Bowman	SF	United States	Bakersfield Jam	Georgetown
12	Troy Bell^{†}	PG	United States	New Mexico Thunderbirds	Skyliners Frankfurt (Germany)

=== Round 2 ===
Pick	Player	Position	Nationality	Team	College/From
13	Jamaal Thomas	SF-PF	United States	New Mexico Thunderbirds	Angelo State
14	Tony Bobbitt	SG-SF	United States	Bakersfield Jam	Air Avellino (Italy)
15	B. J. Elder	SF	United States	Austin Toros	Giessen 46ers (Germany)
16	Eddie Robinson	SG-SF	United States	Idaho Stampede	Chicago Bulls
17	Nate Williams	PF-C	United States	Tulsa 66ers	Georgia State
18	Aloysius Anagonye	SF/PF	United States; Nigeria	Los Angeles D-Fenders	DKV Joventut
19	Badou Gaye	C	Senegal	Arkansas RimRockers	Liège (Belgium)
20	Quemont Greer	SG-SF	United States	Dakota Wizards	DePaul
21	Jeremy Richardson^{†}	SG-SF	United States	Fort Worth Flyers	Delta State
22	Von Wafer^{†}	SG	United States	Colorado 14ers	Los Angeles Lakers
23	DeSean Hadley	G	United States	Sioux Falls Skyforce	Eastern Michigan
24	Andre Owens^{†}	SG	United States	Anaheim Arsenal	Utah Jazz

=== Round 3 ===
Pick	Player	Position	Nationality	Team	College/From
25	Tyler Smith	F	United States	Anaheim Arsenal	Utah Jazz (preseason)
26	Frankie Williams	PG	United States	Sioux Falls Skyforce	Chicago Bulls
27	Eugene Jeter	PG	United States	Colorado 14ers	Portland
28	David Logan	PG/SG	United States; Poland	Fort Worth Flyers	Hapoel MB9 Ramat HaSharon
29	Brandon Armstrong	SG	United States	Dakota Wizards	Roseto Sharks {Italy}
30	Jason Smith	F	United States	Arkansas RimRockers	Ole Miss
31	Akin Akingbala	F	Nigeria	Los Angeles D-Fenders	Clemson
32	Mike Hall	F	United States	Tulsa 66ers	George Washington
33	Dexter Lyons	SF	United States	Idaho Stampede	UCF
34	Brock Gillespie	PG	United States	Austin Toros	Rice
35	Yuta Tabuse	PG	Japan	Bakersfield Jam	Phoenix Suns
36	Eddy Fobbs	F-C	United States	New Mexico Thunderbirds	Sam Houston State

=== Round 4 ===
Pick	Player	Position	Nationality	Team	College/From
37	Manuel Narvaez	C	United States; Puerto Rico	New Mexico Thunderbirds	Baloncesto Superior Nacional
38	Anthony Coleman	PF	United States	Bakersfield Jam	Albuquerque Thunderbirds
39	Walter Waters	C	United States	Austin Toros	Detroit Panthers (PBL)
40	Jeff Graves	SF	United States	Idaho Stampede	Kansas City Knights (ABA)
41	Mike Benton	C	United States	Tulsa 66ers	Colorado 14ers
42	Travis Garrison	SG	United States	Los Angeles D-Fenders	Maryland
43	Ricky Shields	PG	United States	Arkansas RimRockers	New Jersey Nets (preseason)
44	Renaldo Major	SF	United States	Dakota Wizards	Golden State Warriors
45	Trent Strickland	F	United States	Fort Worth Flyers	Wake Forest
46	Julian Sensley	F	United States	Colorado 14ers	Hawaii
47	Jeff Varem	SG-SF	Nigeria	Sioux Falls Skyforce	Chicago Bulls (preseason)
48	Greg Clausen	C	United States	Anaheim Arsenal	Marquette

=== Round 5 ===
Pick	Player	Position	Nationality	Team	College/From
49	Carl Edwards	SG-SF	United States	Anaheim Arsenal	Charleston
50	Mahmoud Abdul-Awwel	PG/SG	United States; Cambodia	Sioux Falls Skyforce	Arizona
51	Bakari Hendrix	PF	United States	Colorado 14ers	Benfica (Portugal)
52	Anderson Ferreira	F	Brazil	Fort Worth Flyers	Brazil
53	Dontell Jefferson	SG	United States	Dakota Wizards	Arkansas
54	G.J. Macon	PF	United States	Arkansas RimRockers	Alaska
55	Nate Johnson	PG	United States	Los Angeles D-Fenders	Los Angeles Lakers
56	Denham Brown^{†}	SG-SF	Canada	Tulsa 66ers	Connecticut
57	PJ Ramos^{†}	C	Puerto Rico	Idaho Stampede	Roanoke Dazzle (NBA D-League)
58	Darius Washington, Jr.	PG/SG	United States	Austin Toros	ČEZ Nymburk
59	Brandon Bowman	SF	United States	Bakersfield Jam	Georgetown
60	Troy Bell^{†}	PG	United States	New Mexico Thunderbirds	Skyliners Frankfurt (Germany)
