= Frankenmuth Credit Union =

- Company type: Credit union
- Industry: Financial services
- Founded: 1964
- Headquarters: Frankenmuth, Michigan, United States
- Products: Savings; checking; consumer loans; mortgages; credit cards; online banking
- Website: frankenmuthcu.org

Frankenmuth Credit Union is a federally insured, state-chartered credit union headquartered in Frankenmuth, Michigan and founded in 1964.

== History ==
Frankenmuth Credit Union was founded in 1964 by employees of the Carling Brewery and Star of the West Milling Company. Their original stated purpose was to serve the brewers and millers of the Frankenmuth, Michigan area. It primarily served employees of Carling Brewery, Zeilinger Beverage, Geyer's Brewery, and Star of the West Milling. It opened its membership to the wider community in 1969.

In December 2017, the company signed a ten-year naming rights deal to have the Birch Run Expo Center renamed the Frankenmuth Credit Union Event Center. The venue ultimately closed and was sold to Camping World in November 2020.

Frankenmuth Credit Union was recognized in 2020 by Forbes and Statista as one of the best credit unions in the nation.

In July 2021, the company introduced services specifically for the cannabis industry in Michigan.

The company merged with Owosso WBC Federal Credit Union on July 31, 2021, keeping the Frankenmuth Credit Union name.

By February 2024, Frankenmuth Credit Union had branches in Bay, Genesee, Huron, Midland, Ogemaw, Saginaw, Sanilac, Shiawassee, and Tuscola counties.

== Operations ==
Frankenmuth Credit Union provides financial services as well as insurance, trust, and investment management to individuals and businesses.

== Controversies ==
In February 2024, the credit union was sued, along with Great Lakes Homes, in an eight-count civil lawsuit filed in Saginaw County, Michigan by sixteen plaintiffs from Saginaw, Bay, Midland and Roscommon counties in Michigan. The plaintiffs alleged that the credit union continued to send clients to Great Lakes Homes, even after a title company would no longer do business with Great Lakes Home because of suspected fraud. The lawsuit also claims that the credit union pressured clients to sign 'Draw Distribution Authorization' documents to release funds to Great Lakes Home and that the plaintiffs' homes construction were either not started, not completed, or deficient. The lawsuit asked for damages of more than US$25,000 for each of the eight counts.

== See also ==
- Credit unions in the United States
- List of credit unions in the United States
