= Brock Gillespie =

American basketball player (born 1982)

Personal information
- Born: April 26, 1982 (age 44) Des Moines, Iowa, U.S.
- Listed height: 6 ft 2 in (1.88 m)
- Listed weight: 170 lb (77 kg)

Career information
- High school: Clarksville (Clarksville, Tennessee)
- College: Rice (2001–2005)
- NBA draft: 2005: undrafted
- Playing career: 2006–2016
- Position: Point guard

Career history
- 2006: Auckland Stars
- 2006–2007: Austin Toros
- 2007–2008: Lleida Bàsquet
- 2007–2008: →CB Plasencia
- 2008: BK SPU Nitra
- 2009: Fribourg Olympic
- 2009: Kataja
- 2010: Maine Red Claws
- 2010: Cuxhaven Bascats
- 2011: SCM CSU Craiova
- 2011: Lechugueros de Leon
- 2012: ŁKS Łódź
- 2012: Toyama Grouses
- 2013: Halifax Rainmen
- 2014: Bambuqueros Utrahuilca
- 2015–2016: CB Ciudad de Valladolid

Brock Andrew Gillespie (born April 26, 1982) is an American former professional basketball player. He played college basketball for the Rice Owls, before playing professionally in the NBA Development League, and in various countries abroad. He also appeared in the Walt Disney movie, Glory Road.

== Early life ==
Gillespie was born in Des Moines, Iowa. He earned second-team All-State honors while playing for Clarksville High School in Clarksville, Tennessee.

In the summer of 2000, Gillespie starred at the prestigious NBA Players Association Top-100 Camp and was selected as an All-Star at the famous Five-Star Camp, where he teamed with LeBron James. In 2001, he led the Tennessee All-Stars to victory over the Georgia All-Stars, in the Coca-Cola All-Star Game. He was named as one of the greatest high school basketball players in Tennessee history.

== College career ==
Gillespie played four years of college basketball for the Rice Owls in the Western Athletic Conference, between 2001 and 2005, finishing his career with 1,007 points.

== Professional career ==
Gillespie's first professional stint came with the Auckland Stars of the New Zealand NBL during the 2006 season. In 17 games, he averaged 12.9 points, 1.7 rebounds and 1.4 assists in 24.9 minutes per game.

On November 2, 2006, Gillespie was selected in the third round of the 2006 NBA Development League Draft by the Austin Toros. In 41 games, he averaged 7.4 points, 1.7 rebounds and 1.7 assists in 20.2 minutes per game.

Gillespie played for the Charlotte Bobcats during the 2007 NBA Summer League. He joined Lleida Bàsquet of the Spanish LEB Oro for the 2007–08 season, playing one game for Lleida before being loaned to CB Plasencia of the LEB Plata in December 2007. After seven games for Plasencia, he joined BK SPU Nitra of the Slovak Extraliga in February 2008. In 26 games for Nitra, he averaged 31.9 points, 3.9 assists and 3.5 steals per game.

On November 7, 2008, Gillespie was selected in the seventh round of the 2008 NBA Development League Draft by the Sioux Falls Skyforce. On November 26, 2008, he was waived by the Skyforce before appearing in a game for them. In February 2009, he signed with Fribourg Olympic of the Swiss LNA. In 11 games, he averaged 16.3 points, 5.1 assists and 2.2 steals per game.

In September 2009, Gillespie signed with Xacobeo BluSens Obradoiro of Spain's Liga ACB, but did not play an official game for the team. In October 2009, he played two games for Kataja of the Finnish Korisliiga. On March 19, 2010, he was acquired by the Maine Red Claws of the NBA Development League.

In July 2010, Gillespie signed with the Cuxhaven Bascats of the German ProA for the 2010–11 season. He left the team in December 2010 after appearing in seven games. In January 2011, he signed with SCM CSU Craiova of the Romanian Liga Națională for the rest of the season. In 11 games, he averaged 15.5 points, 1.8 rebounds, 3.2 assists and 1.1 steals per game.

In August 2011, Gillespie joined Lechugueros de Leon of the Mexican LNBP. He played four games between August 30 and September 10. On November 3, 2011, he was selected in the eighth round of the 2011 NBA Development League Draft by the Sioux Falls Skyforce. He did not debut for the Skyforce. In January 2012, he signed with ŁKS Łódź of the Polish Basketball League. He played one game before joining the Toyama Grouses of the Japanese bj league in February 2012.

On August 29, 2013, Gillespie signed with the Halifax Rainmen of the National Basketball League of Canada for the 2013–14 season. He left after four games. In March 2014, he signed with Bambuqueros Utrahuilca of the Liga DirecTV, in Colombia.

In September 2015, Gillespie signed with CB Ciudad de Valladolid of the LEB Plata for the 2015–16 season.

== Personal ==
In 2006, Gillespie was cast by producer Jerry Bruckheimer and appeared in the Walt Disney movie, Glory Road.

In the political arena, Gillespie served as a Field Representative in the United States House of Representatives, for Congressman Pete Olson, of Texas.

While living in China, Gillespie chaired a number of international sport and trade enterprises. He has since made regular speaking and media appearances as a 'China expert' on prominent networks such as Fox News.

Gillespie was featured alongside Melania Trump and David Beckham in Roger Stone's "International Best Dressed List", profiling the most fashionable stars of politics and entertainment.
