= Frankenmuth Credit Union Event Center =

Multi-purpose arena in Birch Run, Michigan

- Interactive map of Frankenmuth Credit Union Event Center
- Former names: Birch Run Expo Center (1997–2017)
- Address: 11600 S Beyer Rd
- Location: Birch Run, Michigan
- Coordinates: 43.2561°N 83.7836°W
- Operator: Oak View Group
- Type: Arena, Convention center

Construction
- Opened: September 11, 1997
- Closed: November 2020

The Frankenmuth Credit Union Event Center (formerly Birch Run Expo Center) was a 2,500 seat multi-purpose arena in Birch Run, Michigan. However, it was sold to Camping World in November 2020 and is now one of their largest showrooms. Prior to 2002, it was the first NHL Skate center. Due to lack of interest, it was converted into an events center. It was also the home of the Great Lakes Storm from 2002 to 2005. Prior to being sold in 2020, it was operated by Oak View Group Facilities and used for trade shows, conventions and other events, such as gun and knife shows and music festivals.

== History ==
Built in 1997, the NHL opened the first of 100 planned local hockey arenas on September 11, 1997 to help promote interest in skating and hockey. Built by SAI Structural, the original facility included two hockey rinks, eight themed locker rooms, family attractions, a food court, and an NHL FANtasy Zone. By mid-1998, the facility in Birch Run had seen nearly a quarter of a million people since the grand opening. However, by late 1999 the center and the whole "NHL Skate" concept was facing financial difficulties and closed in 2000.

In December 2017, Frankenmuth Credit Union signed a ten-year naming rights deal to have the venue renamed from the Birch Run Expo Center to the Frankenmuth Credit Union Event Center.

The venue ultimately closed and was sold to Camping World in November 2020.
