= Flint Fuze =

American basketball team

- Leagues: CBA
- Founded: 2001
- Folded: 2004
- History: Flint Fuse (2001–2002); Great Lakes Storm (2002–2004)
- Arena: IMA Sports Arena
- Location: Flint, Michigan
- Team colors: blue, light blue, white

The Flint Fuze were a professional basketball team located in Flint, Michigan, United States, in 2001. They were a part of the Continental Basketball Association (CBA) and played their home games at the IMA Sports Arena. Former National Basketball Association journeyman Jeff Grayer helped create the franchise and served as the team's initial head coach. After the 2001 season, low attendance forced the Fuze to relocate to Birch Run, Michigan, and become the Great Lakes Storm. After the 2004 season, the franchise folded.
