= John H. Patterson Career Center =

Location
- 118 E. 1st St. Dayton, Ohio 45402; United States
- Coordinates: 39.762462°N 84.189815°W

Information
- Type: Public Secondary
- Established: 1952
- Grades: 9-12
- Enrollment: 5,469
- Colors: Crimson & Gray

The John H. Patterson Career Center was part of Dayton City Schools. The school was closed in 2009 and turned into Ponitz Career Technology Center. The school was named after John Henry Patterson, Dayton native and founder of NCR Corporation. Patterson had a job curriculum, that allowed students, to work full time in their elected field, this unique program, allowed students, to work for two weeks, and attend school for two weeks, dividing the class into sections, this allowed students, to work and earn money, and learn their specific field.

Patterson Co-Op was built in 1952 and was merged with Stivers High School in the 1973–74 school year. and was sometimes referred to as Stivers-Patterson at that point; prior to 1973 the school was most often called John H. Patterson Cooperative High School.

== Curriculum ==
Patterson offered a three-year career-technical certificate in:

- Allied Health (Dental, Medical)
- Business and Marketing
- Cosmetology
- Engineering Technologies
- Food Management
- Graphics Communication
- Machine Trades
- Radio/TV

Patterson met three of the 12 state indicators for the 2005–2006 school year, earning it a rating of "Continuous Improvement" rating.

== Ohio High School Athletic Association State Championships ==
- Boys Track and Field – 1985
