= Cedar Rapids River Raiders =

- Nickname: River Raiders
- League: USBL
- Founded: 2003; 23 years ago
- Dissolved: August 2004
- Arena: U.S. Cellular Center
- Capacity: 6,900
- Location: Cedar Rapids, IA
- Team colors: Black; Dark Red; Light Gray
- Team manager: Sean M. McLaughlin
- Head coach: Dave Joerger; Kenyon Murray
- Ownership: Barry S. Smith and Toni Smith
- Championships: None

The Cedar Rapids River Raiders were a former professional basketball team based in Cedar Rapids, Iowa. They were a part of the United States Basketball League. The organization was founded in 2003 and existed for one season (2004). They played their home games at U.S. Cellular Center.

== See also ==
- Cedar Rapids Silver Bullets
