= Great Lakes Storm =

Sports team

- Leagues: CBA
- Founded: 2002
- Folded: 2005
- History: Flint Fuze (2001–2002); Great Lakes Storm (2002–2005)
- Arena: Birch Run Expo Center
- Location: Birch Run, Michigan
- Team colors: purple, red, gray

The Great Lakes Storm was a basketball team that played in the Continental Basketball Association (CBA) for three seasons, beginning in 2002 and ending in 2005. They were based in Birch Run, Michigan, a small town between Flint and Saginaw. The Storm played at the Birch Run Expo Center. The original team was called the Flint Fuze.
